= 2025 LiUNA! 150 (ARCA) =

2025 ARCA Menards Series and ARCA Menards Series East combination race

2025 LiUNA! 150 presented by Dutch Boy
Race details
- Race 11 of 20 of the 2025 ARCA Menards Series; Race 6 of 8 of the 2025 ARCA Menards Series East
- Date: July 25, 2025
- Official name: 17th Annual LiUNA! 150 presented by Dutch Boy
- Location: Lucas Oil Indianapolis Raceway Park in Brownsburg, Indiana
- Course: Permanent racing facility
- Course length: 0.686 miles (1.104 km)
- Distance: 150 laps, 102.9 mi (165.6 km)
- Scheduled distance: 150 laps, 102.9 mi (165.6 km)
- Average speed: 69.736 mph (112.229 km/h)

Pole position
Driver	Brenden Queen	Pinnacle Racing Group
- Grid positions set by competition-based formula

Most laps led
Driver	Brenden Queen	Pinnacle Racing Group
- Laps: 91

Winner
No. 18	Brent Crews	Joe Gibbs Racing

Television in the United States
- Network: FS1
- Announcers: Brent Stover, Phil Parsons, and Trevor Bayne

Radio in the United States
- Radio: MRN

The 2025 LiUNA! 150 presented by Dutch Boy was the 11th stock car race of the 2025 ARCA Menards Series season, the 6th race of the 2025 ARCA Menards Series East season, and the 17th iteration of the event. The race was held on Friday, July 25, 2025, at Lucas Oil Indianapolis Raceway Park in Brownsburg, Indiana, a 0.686 mile (1.104 km) permanent oval shaped racetrack. The race took the scheduled 150 laps to complete. Brent Crews, driving for Joe Gibbs Racing, would make a pass on the dominating driver Brenden Queen in the final stages, and led the final 58 laps of the event to earn his fourth career ARCA Menards Series win, his second career ARCA Menards Series East win, and his third win of the season. Queen dominated the majority of the race, leading a race-high 91 laps before falling off on pace in the final segment. To fill out the podium, Lawless Alan, driving for Venturini Motorsports, and Queen, driving for Pinnacle Racing Group, would finish 2nd and 3rd, respectively.

== Report ==
=== Background ===
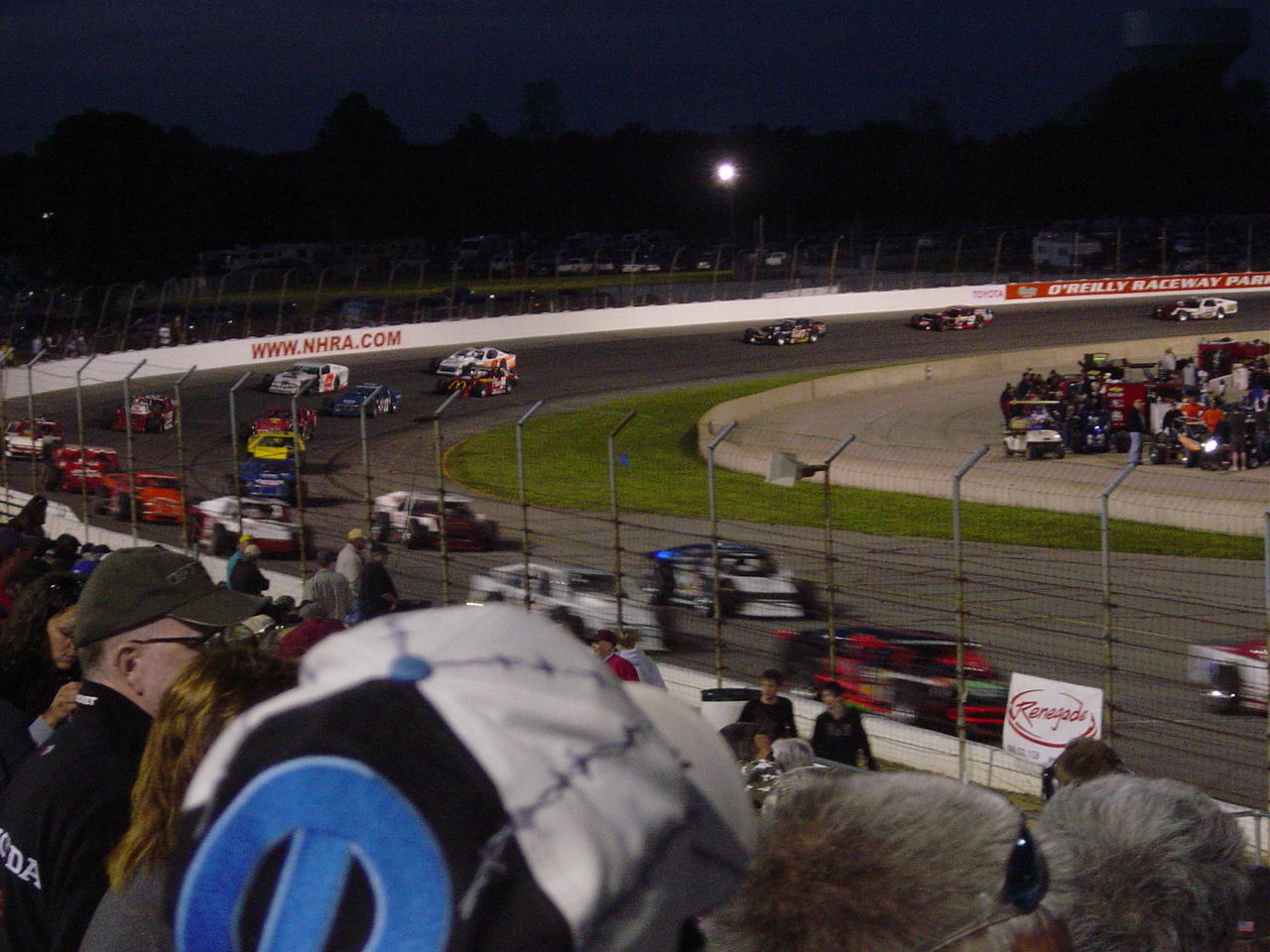
Lucas Oil Indianapolis Raceway Park, the track where the race was held.

Lucas Oil Indianapolis Raceway Park (formerly Indianapolis Raceway Park, O'Reilly Raceway Park at Indianapolis, and Lucas Oil Raceway) is an auto racing facility in Brownsburg, Indiana, about 10 miles (16 km) northwest of downtown Indianapolis. It includes a 0.686-mile (1.104 km) oval track, a 2.5-mile (4.0 km) road course (which has fallen into disrepair and is no longer used), and a 4,400-foot (1,300 m) drag strip which is among the premier drag racing venues in the world. The complex receives about 500,000 visitors annually.

==== Entry list ====
- (R) denotes rookie driver.

#	Driver	Team	Make
01	Matt Kemp	Fast Track Racing	Toyota
2	Lanie Buice	Rev Racing	Chevrolet
03	Alex Clubb	Clubb Racing Inc.	Ford
5	Michael Clayton	City Garage Motorsports	Ford
06	Brayton Laster (R)	Wayne Peterson Racing	Toyota
6	Lavar Scott	Rev Racing	Chevrolet
7	Kadence Davenport	CCM Racing	Chevrolet
9	Cody Dennison	Fast Track Racing	Toyota
10	Tony Cosentino	Fast Track Racing	Ford
11	Zachary Tinkle	Fast Track Racing	Toyota
12	Takuma Koga (R)	Fast Track Racing	Toyota
18	Brent Crews	Joe Gibbs Racing	Toyota
20	Lawless Alan	Venturini Motorsports	Toyota
23	Tyler Reif (R)	Sigma Performance Services	Chevrolet
25	Mason Mitchell	Venturini Motorsports	Toyota
28	Brenden Queen (R)	Pinnacle Racing Group	Chevrolet
31	Quinn Davis	Rise Motorsports	Toyota
34	Austin Vaughn (R)	VWV Racing	Ford
40	Andrew Patterson	Andrew Patterson Racing	Chevrolet
46	Thad Moffitt	Nitro Motorsports	Toyota
48	Brad Smith	Brad Smith Motorsports	Ford
55	Isabella Robusto (R)	Venturini Motorsports	Toyota
67	Presley Sorah	Maples Motorsports	Chevrolet
68	Regina Sirvent	Kimmel Racing	Ford
69	Brian Finney	Finney Racing Enterprises	Chevrolet
70	Sam Corry	Nitro Motorsports	Toyota
79	Isaac Kitzmiller (R)	ACR Motorsports	Chevrolet
82	Connor Mosack	Pinnacle Racing Group	Chevrolet
85	Becca Monopoli	City Garage Motorsports	Ford
86	Doug Miller	Clubb Racing Inc.	Ford
95	Hunter Wright	MAN Motorsports	Toyota
96	Jackson McLerran	MAN Motorsports	Toyota
97	Jason Kitzmiller	CR7 Motorsports	Chevrolet
98	Mike Basham	Shearer Speed Racing	Toyota
99	Michael Maples	Maples Motorsports	Chevrolet
Official entry list

== Practice ==
The first and only practice session was originally scheduled to be held on Friday, July 25, at 1:00 PM EST, but was postponed due to inclement weather. The session was rescheduled for 2:10 PM, and would last for 35 minutes. Brenden Queen, driving for Pinnacle Racing Group, would set the fastest time in the session, with a lap of 23.047, and a speed of 107.155 mph (172.449 km/h).

Pos.	#	Driver	Team	Make	Time	Speed
1	28	Brenden Queen (R)	Pinnacle Racing Group	Chevrolet	23.047	107.155
2	82	Connor Mosack	Pinnacle Racing Group	Chevrolet	23.061	107.090
3	18	Brent Crews	Joe Gibbs Racing	Toyota	23.166	106.605
Full practice results

== Starting lineup ==
Qualifying was originally scheduled to be held on Friday, July 25, at 2:00 PM EST, but was cancelled due to inclement weather, and was replaced with the practice session. The starting lineup would be determined by this season's owners' points (including 2025 East Series points). As a result, Brenden Queen, driving for Pinnacle Racing Group, was awarded the pole.

Michael Clayton was the only driver who failed to qualify.

=== Starting lineup ===
Pos.	#	Driver	Team	Make
1	28	Brenden Queen (R)	Pinnacle Racing Group	Chevrolet
2	18	Brent Crews	Joe Gibbs Racing	Toyota
3	79	Isaac Kitzmiller (R)	ACR Motorsports	Chevrolet
4	20	Lawless Alan	Venturini Motorsports	Toyota
5	25	Mason Mitchell	Venturini Motorsports	Toyota
6	23	Tyler Reif (R)	Sigma Performance Services	Chevrolet
7	11	Zachary Tinkle	Fast Track Racing	Toyota
8	6	Lavar Scott	Rev Racing	Chevrolet
9	70	Sam Corry	Nitro Motorsports	Toyota
10	12	Takuma Koga (R)	Fast Track Racing	Toyota
11	10	Tony Cosentino	Fast Track Racing	Ford
12	97	Jason Kitzmiller	CR7 Motorsports	Chevrolet
13	55	Isabella Robusto (R)	Venturini Motorsports	Toyota
14	34	Austin Vaughn (R)	VWV Racing	Ford
15	06	Brayton Laster (R)	Wayne Peterson Racing	Toyota
16	03	Alex Clubb	Clubb Racing Inc.	Ford
17	99	Michael Maples	Maples Motorsports	Chevrolet
18	48	Brad Smith	Brad Smith Motorsports	Ford
19	9	Cody Dennison	Fast Track Racing	Toyota
20	67	Presley Sorah	Maples Motorsports	Chevrolet
21	31	Quinn Davis	Rise Motorsports	Toyota
22	01	Matt Kemp	Fast Track Racing	Toyota
23	86	Doug Miller	Clubb Racing Inc.	Ford
24	2	Lanie Buice	Rev Racing	Chevrolet
25	68	Regina Sirvent	Kimmel Racing	Ford
26	95	Hunter Wright	MAN Motorsports	Toyota
27	40	Andrew Patterson	Andrew Patterson Racing	Chevrolet
28	69	Brian Finney	Finney Racing Enterprises	Chevrolet
29	82	Connor Mosack	Pinnacle Racing Group	Chevrolet
30	85	Becca Monopoli	City Garage Motorsports	Ford
31	96	Jackson McLerran	MAN Motorsports	Toyota
32	98	Mike Basham	Shearer Speed Racing	Toyota
33	7	Kadence Davenport	CCM Racing	Chevrolet
34	46	Thad Moffitt	Nitro Motorsports	Toyota
Failed to qualify
35	5	Michael Clayton	City Garage Motorsports	Ford
Official starting lineup

== Race results ==
Fin	St	#	Driver	Team	Make	Laps	Led	Status	Pts
1	2	18	Brent Crews	Joe Gibbs Racing	Toyota	150	58	Running	47
2	4	20	Lawless Alan	Venturini Motorsports	Toyota	150	1	Running	43
3	1	28	Brenden Queen (R)	Pinnacle Racing Group	Chevrolet	150	91	Running	43
4	13	55	Isabella Robusto (R)	Venturini Motorsports	Toyota	150	0	Running	40
5	8	6	Lavar Scott	Rev Racing	Chevrolet	150	0	Running	39
6	29	82	Connor Mosack	Pinnacle Racing Group	Chevrolet	150	0	Running	38
7	3	79	Isaac Kitzmiller (R)	ACR Motorsports	Chevrolet	150	0	Running	37
8	12	97	Jason Kitzmiller	CR7 Motorsports	Chevrolet	150	0	Running	36
9	26	95	Hunter Wright	MAN Motorsports	Toyota	150	0	Running	35
10	34	46	Thad Moffitt	Nitro Motorsports	Toyota	150	0	Running	34
11	24	2	Lanie Buice	Rev Racing	Chevrolet	150	0	Running	33
12	27	40	Andrew Patterson	Andrew Patterson Racing	Chevrolet	150	0	Running	32
13	9	70	Sam Corry	Nitro Motorsports	Toyota	150	0	Running	31
14	6	23	Tyler Reif (R)	Sigma Performance Services	Chevrolet	150	0	Running	30
15	5	25	Mason Mitchell	Venturini Motorsports	Toyota	150	0	Running	29
16	7	11	Zachary Tinkle	Fast Track Racing	Toyota	150	0	Running	28
17	25	68	Regina Sirvent	Kimmel Racing	Ford	150	0	Running	27
18	19	9	Cody Dennison	Fast Track Racing	Toyota	150	0	Running	26
19	21	31	Quinn Davis	Rise Motorsports	Toyota	147	0	Running	25
20	31	96	Jackson McLerran	MAN Motorsports	Toyota	146	0	Running	24
21	11	10	Tony Cosentino	Fast Track Racing	Ford	145	0	Running	23
22	16	03	Alex Clubb	Clubb Racing Inc.	Ford	143	0	Running	22
23	33	7	Kadence Davenport	CCM Racing	Chevrolet	143	0	Running	21
24	32	98	Mike Basham	Shearer Speed Racing	Toyota	141	0	Running	20
25	15	06	Brayton Laster (R)	Wayne Peterson Racing	Toyota	140	0	Running	19
26	18	48	Brad Smith	Brad Smith Motorsports	Ford	111	0	Mechanical	18
27	28	69	Brian Finney	Finney Racing Enterprises	Chevrolet	103	0	Accident	17
28	20	67	Presley Sorah	Maples Motorsports	Chevrolet	99	0	Mechanical	16
29	17	99	Michael Maples	Maples Motorsports	Chevrolet	89	0	Mechanical	15
30	14	34	Austin Vaughn (R)	VWV Racing	Ford	49	0	Accident	14
31	10	12	Takuma Koga (R)	Fast Track Racing	Toyota	49	0	Accident	13
32	22	01	Matt Kemp	Fast Track Racing	Toyota	20	0	Mechanical	12
33	23	86	Doug Miller	Clubb Racing Inc.	Ford	10	0	Mechanical	11
34	30	85	Becca Monopoli	City Garage Motorsports	Ford	5	0	Mechanical	10
Official race results

== Standings after the race ==
Drivers' Championship standings (ARCA Main)

	Pos	Driver	Points
	1	Brenden Queen	554
	2	Lawless Alan	528 (–26)
	3	Lavar Scott	517 (–37)
	4	Jason Kitzmiller	454 (–100)
	5	Isabella Robusto	437 (–117)
	6	Alex Clubb	389 (–165)
	7	Michael Maples	375 (–179)
	8	Brayton Laster	364 (–190)
	9	Andy Jankowiak	262 (–292)
1	10	Thad Moffitt	261 (–293)

Drivers' Championship standings (ARCA East)

	Pos	Driver	Points
	1	Isaac Kitzmiller	281
	2	Tyler Reif	267 (–14)
	3	Zachary Tinkle	257 (–24)
	4	Takuma Koga	232 (–49)
	5	Austin Vaughn	223 (–58)
	6	Brad Smith	204 (–77)
	7	Max Reaves	146 (–135)
7	8	Brent Crews	119 (–162)
1	9	Nate Moeller	116 (–165)
1	10	Andrew Patterson	114 (–167)

- Note: Only the first 10 positions are included for the driver standings.

Previous race: 2025 General Tire 150 (Dover)	ARCA Menards Series; 2025 season	Next race: 2025 Atlas 150

Previous race: 2025 General Tire 150 (Dover)	ARCA Menards Series East; 2025 season	Next race: 2025 Atlas 150
