= Max Reaves =

American racing driver (born 2010)

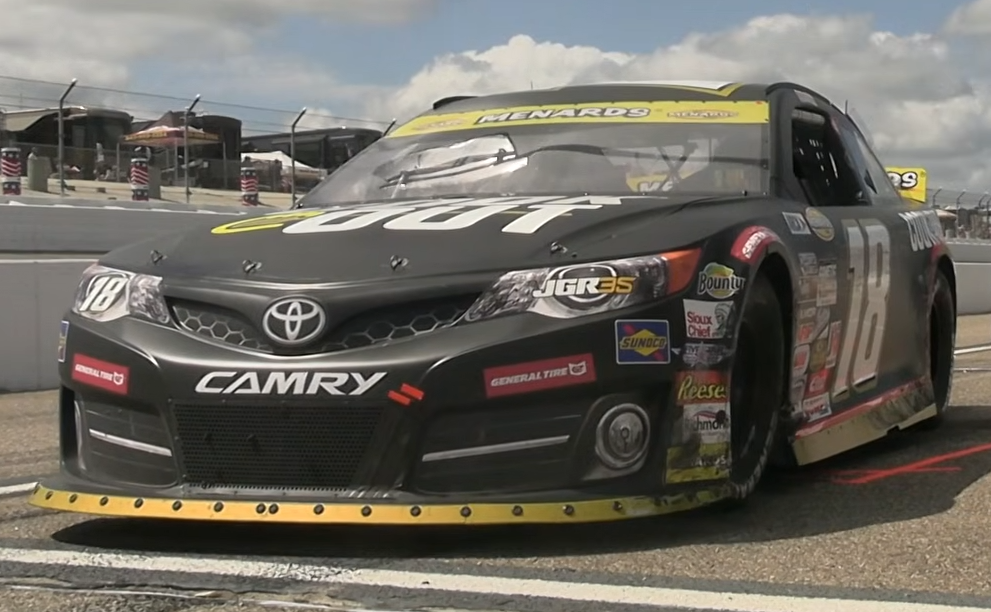
- Reaves' No. 18 car at Rockingham Speedway in 2026
- Born: January 6, 2010 (age 16); Trinity, North Carolina, U.S.
- Awards: 2026 ARCA Menards Series East Rookie of the Year

ARCA Menards Series career
- 20 races run over 2 years
- Best finish: 11th (2026)
- First race: 2025 Berlin ARCA 200 (Berlin)
- Last race: 2026 Bush's Best 200 (Bristol)
- First win: 2025 Shore Lunch 250 (Elko)
- Last win: 2026 Spruce 212 (Salem)
Wins	Top tens	Poles
7	17	6

ARCA Menards Series East career
- 11 races run over 2 years
- Best finish: 2nd (2026)
- First race: 2025 Pensacola 150 (Pensacola)
- Last race: 2026 Bush's Best 200 (Bristol)
- First win: 2025 Pensacola 150 (Pensacola)
- Last win: 2026 Sunbelt Rentals 150 (Flat Rock)
Wins	Top tens	Poles
5	10	5

ARCA Menards Series West career
- 2 races run over 1 year
- First race: 2026 General Tire 150 (Phoenix)
- Last race: 2026 Desert Diamond Casino West Valley 100 (Phoenix)
- First win: 2026 Desert Diamond Casino West Valley 100 (Phoenix)
Wins	Top tens	Poles
1	2	1
- Statistics up to date as of October 17, 2026.

Max Reaves (born January 6, 2010) is an American professional stock car racing driver. He last competed part-time in the ARCA Menards Series and full-time in the ARCA Menards Series East, driving the No. 18 Toyota Camry for Joe Gibbs Racing.

== Racing career ==
Reaves has previously competed in series such as the Carolina Pro Late Model Series, where he won the championship in 2024, the CARS Pro Late Model Tour, the CARS Late Model Stock Tour, and the INEX Summer Shootout.

In 2024, Reaves joined Joe Gibbs Racing as a development driver.

On January 2, 2025, it was revealed that Reaves would run a partial schedule in both the ARCA Menards Series and the ARCA Menards Series East, driving the No. 18 Toyota for Joe Gibbs Racing. He became the first driver born in the 2010s to compete in an ARCA race.

=== ARCA Menards Series East ===
On March 22, 2025, Reaves became the first driver born in the 2010s to win an ARCA race, winning on his East Series debut at Five Flags Speedway after starting from pole position. After missing the race at Rockingham, he won the next two races at Nashville Fairgrounds and at Flat Rock, becoming only the second driver since Will Rodgers to win in their first three starts in the East Series.

In 2026, Reaves competed full-time in the East Series with JGR, where he won two races at Nashville and Flat Rock and finished second in the points to Tristan McKee.

=== ARCA Menards Series ===
Reaves scored a runner-up finish in his first race in the series at Berlin before winning the following week at Elko after overtaking Brenden Queen and Lavar Scott. He also won at Madison after leading all but one lap from the pole, as well as the season ending race at Toledo.

In 2026, Reaves participated in the pre-season test at Daytona International Speedway for JGR, where he set the 18th quickest time between the two sessions held. For the season, he would compete in 13 races with JGR, where he won four races at Berlin, Elko, Springfield, and Salem.

=== ARCA Menards Series West ===
Reaves finished ninth in the combination race with the main ARCA series and the West Series with JGR at Phoenix, where he finished in ninth. He later won in the series' return to the track in October, which would be the last race for JGR in the ARCA platform.

== Personal life ==
Reaves is the son of Jeremy Reaves, who is the co-owner of Cook Out, and grandson of franchise founder Morris Reaves. He is the older brother of Roo Reaves, who also competes in racing.

== Motorsports career results ==
=== Career summary ===
Season	Series	Team	Races	Wins	Top 5	Top 10	Points	Position
2024	CARS Pro Late Model Tour	RooMax Racing	7	0	1	3	151	14th
2024	CARS Late Model Stock Car Tour	Sellers Racing Inc.	1	0	0	1	0	N/A
2025	ASA STARS National Tour	Jeremy Reeves	1	0	1	1	80	36th
2025	CARS Pro Late Model Tour	RooMax DLP Motorsports Racing	1	0	0	0	18	81st
2025	CARS Late Model Stock Car Tour	Sellers Racing Inc.	2	0	0	0	31	61st
2025	ARCA Menards Series East	Joe Gibbs Racing	3	3	3	3	146	14th
2025	ARCA Menards Series	Joe Gibbs Racing	7	3	4	6	283	15th
2026	ASA STARS National Tour	Jeremy Reeves	2	0	0	0		
2026	CARS Pro Late Model Tour	RooMaxx DLP Motorsports Racing	1	0	1	1	40	36th
2026	CARS Late Model Stock Car Tour	Sellers RooMax Racing	1	0	0	0	31	59th
2026	ARCA Menards Series West	Joe Gibbs Racing	2	1	1	2	83	29th
2026	ARCA Menards Series East	Joe Gibbs Racing	8	2	5	7	428	**2nd**
2026	ARCA Menards Series	Joe Gibbs Racing	13	4	8	11	523	11th

=== ARCA Menards Series ===
(key) (Bold – Pole position awarded by qualifying time. Italics – Pole position earned by points standings or practice time. * – Most laps led. ** – All laps led.)

ARCA Menards Series results
Year	Team	No.	Make	1	2	3	4	5	6	7	8	9	10	11	12	13	14	15	16	17	18	19	20	AMSC	Pts	Ref
2025	Joe Gibbs Racing	18	Toyota	DAY	PHO	TAL	KAN	CLT	MCH	BLN; 2	ELK; 1	LRP	DOV	IRP	IOW	GLN	ISF; 6	**MAD**; 1**	DSF; 10	BRI	**SLM**; 18*	KAN	**TOL**; 1*	15th	283	
2026	Joe Gibbs Racing	18	Toyota	DAY	PHO; 9	KAN	TAL	GLN; 8	**TOL**; 11	MCH	POC	BER; 1*	ELK; 1	CHI	LRP; 4	IRP; 9	IOW; 4	**ISF**; 1*	MAD; 3	DSF; 17	**SLM**; 1**	BRI; 4	KAN	11th	523	

==== ARCA Menards Series East ====
ARCA Menards Series East results
Year	Team	No.	Make	1	2	3	4	5	6	7	8	AMSEC	Pts	Ref
2025	Joe Gibbs Racing	18	Toyota	**FIF**; 1*	CAR	NSV; 1*	**FRS**; 1*	DOV	IRP	IOW	BRI	14th	146	
2026	Joe Gibbs Racing	18	Toyota	**HCY**; 2*	CAR; 8	**NSV**; 1**	**TOL**; 11	IRP; 9	FRS; 1*	IOW; 4	BRI; 4	2nd	428	

==== ARCA Menards Series West ====
ARCA Menards Series West results
Year	Team	No.	Make	1	2	3	4	5	6	7	8	9	10	11	12	13	AMSWC	Pts	Ref
2026	Joe Gibbs Racing	18	Toyota	KER	PHO; 9	TUC	SHA	CNS	TRI	SON	PIR	AAS	MAD	LVS	**PHO**; 1*	KER	29th	83	

=== CARS Late Model Stock Car Tour ===
(key) (Bold – Pole position awarded by qualifying time. Italics – Pole position earned by points standings or practice time. * – Most laps led. ** – All laps led.)

CARS Late Model Stock Car Tour results
Year	Team	No.	Make	1	2	3	4	5	6	7	8	9	10	11	12	13	14	15	16	17	CLMSCTC	Pts	Ref
2024	Sellers Racing Inc.	18	Toyota	SNM	HCY	AAS	OCS	ACE	TCM	LGY	DOM	CRW	HCY	NWS	ACE	WCS	FLC	SBO	TCM; 10	NWS	N/A	0	
2025	Sellers Racing Inc.	18	Toyota	AAS; 28	WCS	CDL	OCS	ACE	NWS	LGY	DOM	CRW; 25	HCY	AND	FLC	SBO	TCM	NWS			61st	31	
2026	Sellers RooMax Racing	18	Toyota	SNM	WCS	NSV	CRW	ACE	LGY	DOM	NWS; 11	HCY	AND	FLC; Wth	TCM	NPS	SBO				59th	31	

=== CARS Pro Late Model Tour ===
(key)

CARS Pro Late Model Tour results
Year	Team	No.	Make	1	2	3	4	5	6	7	8	9	10	11	12	13	CPLMTC	Pts	Ref
2024	RooMax Racing	88	Toyota	SNM	HCY; 22	OCS; 7	ACE; 14	TCM	CRW; 14	HCY	NWS	ACE; 6	FLC	SBO	TCM; 12	NWS; 5	14th	151	
2025	RooMax DLP Motorsports Racing	18	Toyota	AAS	CDL	OCS	ACE	NWS; 24	CRW	HCY	HCY	AND	FLC	SBO	TCM	NWS	81st	18	
2026	RooMax DLP Motorsports Racing	18	Toyota	**SNM**; 4	NSV	CRW	ACE						NPS; Wth	SBO			36th	40	
2026	RooMax DLP Motorsports Racing	18R	Toyota					NWS; Wth	HCY	AND	FLC	TCM					36th	40	

=== ASA STARS National Tour ===
(key) (Bold – Pole position awarded by qualifying time. Italics – Pole position earned by points standings or practice time. * – Most laps led. ** – All laps led.)

ASA STARS National Tour results
Year	Team	No.	Make	1	2	3	4	5	6	7	8	9	10	11	12	ASNTC	Pts	Ref
2025	Jeremy Reaves	18	Toyota	NSM	FIF	DOM	HCY	NPS	MAD	SLG	AND	OWO	TOL; 3	WIN	NSV	36th	80	
2026	Jeremy Reaves	18	Toyota	NSM; 23	FIF	HCY	SLG	MAD; 14	NPS	OWO	TRI	WIN	NSV	NSM		-*	-*	
