= Kadence Davenport =

American racing driver (born 2004)

- Born: July 15, 2004 (age 22); Slater, Iowa, U.S.

ARCA Menards Series career
- 4 races run over 2 years
- Best finish: 63rd (2025)
- First race: 2025 Shore Lunch 250 (Elko)
- Last race: 2026 JR & CO. 150 (Iowa)
Wins	Top tens	Poles
0	0	0

ARCA Menards Series East career
- 3 races run over 2 years
- Best finish: 44th (2025)
- First race: 2025 LiUNA! 150 (IRP)
- Last race: 2026 JR & CO. 150 (Iowa)
Wins	Top tens	Poles
0	0	0
- Statistics up to date as of August 7, 2026.

Kadence Davenport (born July 15, 2004) is an American professional stock car racing driver. She last competed part-time in the ARCA Menards Series, driving the No. 7 Chevrolet for CCM Racing.

== Racing career ==
Davenport started her racing career at the age of six, where she raced in go-karts. From 2020 to 2022, she made select starts in the United States Racing Association in the B-Mod division.

In 2025, it was announced that Davenport would race in the ARCA Menards Series in a three-race schedule, driving the No. 7 Chevrolet for CCM Racing. She made her debut at Elko Speedway, where after placing seventeenth in the lone practice session, qualified in eighteenth and finished in seventeenth due to mechanical issues. Her next race was at Lucas Oil Indianapolis Raceway Park, which also served as her debut in the ARCA Menards Series East as it was a combination race with the main ARCA series. After starting in 33rd due to qualifying being rained out, she placed 28th in practice and finished seven laps down in 23rd. Davenport's last scheduled start was at Iowa Speedway, where after placing twentieth in the lone practice session, she qualified in nineteenth and finished eleven laps down in seventeenth.

== Personal life ==
Despite sharing the same last name, Davenport is not related to fellow racing driver Jonathan Davenport.

== Motorsports results ==
=== ARCA Menards Series ===
(key) (Bold – Pole position awarded by qualifying time. Italics – Pole position earned by points standings or practice time. * – Most laps led.)

ARCA Menards Series results
Year	Team	No.	Make	1	2	3	4	5	6	7	8	9	10	11	12	13	14	15	16	17	18	19	20	AMSC	Pts	Ref
2025	CCM Racing	7	Chevy	DAY	PHO	TAL	KAN	CLT	MCH	BLN	ELK; 17	LRP	DOV	IRP; 23	IOW; 17	GLN	ISF	MAD	DSF	BRI	SLM	KAN	TOL	63rd	75	
2026	CCM Racing	7	Chevy	DAY	PHO	KAN	TAL	GLN	TOL	MCH	POC	BER	ELK	CHI	LRP	IRP	IOW; 33	ISF	MAD	DSF	SLM	BRI	KAN	135th	11	

==== ARCA Menards Series East ====
ARCA Menards Series East results
Year	Team	No.	Make	1	2	3	4	5	6	7	8	AMSEC	Pts	Ref
2025	CCM Racing	7	Chevy	FIF	CAR	NSV	FRS	DOV	IRP; 23	IOW; 17	BRI	44th	48	
2026	CCM Racing	7	Chevy	HCY	CAR	NSV	TOL	IRP	FRS	IOW; 33	BRI	70th	11	
