= VWV Racing =

American stock car racing team

WAV Racing
- Owner(s): Dee Vaughn; Larry Wilcox
- Base: Burnsville, Mississippi
- Series: ARCA Menards Series East
- Race drivers: ARCA Menards Series East: 34. Brian Barbarow, T. J. Harris, Ivis Earley (part-time)
- Manufacturer: Toyota

Career
- Debut: 2025
- Races competed: Total: 14; ARCA Menards Series: 5 ARCA Menards Series East: 9
- Drivers' Championships: Total: 0 ARCA Menards Series: 0 ARCA Menards Series East: 0
- Race victories: 0
- Pole positions: 0

Wilcox & Vaughn Racing, operating as WAV Racing (formerly VWV Racing), is an American professional stock car racing team team that currently competes in the ARCA Menards Series East, fielding the No. 34 Toyota part-time for multiple drivers.

== ARCA Menards Series ==
=== Car No. 34 history ===
In 2025, it was revealed the team would make its ARCA Menards Series debut at Lime Rock Park with Corey Aiken driving. Aiken would finish the race in sixteenth, sixteen laps off the pace. Austin Vaughn would make his first start of the season at Dover Motor Speedway, a combination race with the ARCA Menards Series East. After starting fourteenth, Vaughn would be involved in an accident at IRP. The damage to the car would cause the team to miss the race at Iowa Speedway, where Vaughn would instead drive for Maples Motorsports. The team would return at Watkins Glen with Aiken behind the wheel.

==== Car No. 34 results ====
ARCA Menards Series results
Year	Driver	No.	Make	1	2	3	4	5	6	7	8	9	10	11	12	13	14	15	16	17	18	19	20	AMSC	Pts	Ref
2025	Corey Aiken	34	Ford	DAY	PHO	TAL	KAN	CLT	MCH	BLN	ELK	LRP; 16				GLN; 26	ISF	MAD	DSF					38th	106	
2025	Austin Vaughn	34	Ford										DOV; 14	IRP; 30	IOW									38th	106	
2025	Corey Aiken	34	Toyota																	BRI; 28	SLM	KAN	TOL	38th	106	
2026	Brian Barbarow	34	Toyota	DAY	PHO	KAN	TAL	GLN	TOL; 19	MCH	POC	BER	ELK	CHI	LRP		IOW; 21	ISF	MAD	DSF	SLM			-*	-*	
2026	Ivis Earley	34	Toyota													IRP; 28						BRI; 27	KAN	-*	-*	

== ARCA Menards Series East ==
=== Car No. 00 history ===
In 2025, it was revealed that Corey Aiken would make his ARCA Menards Series East debut in the 2025 Pensacola 150 at Five Flags Speedway alongside VWV Racing in their No. 00 Toyota Camry.

==== Car No. 00 results ====
ARCA Menards Series East results
Year	Driver	No.	Make	1	2	3	4	5	6	7	8	AMSEC	Pts	Ref
2025	Corey Aiken	00	Toyota	FIF; 20	CAR; 25	NSV	FRS	DOV	IRP	IOW	BRI	40th	44	

=== Car No. 34 history ===
In 2025, it was revealed that VWV Racing would make their ARCA Menards Series East debut in the 2025 Pensacola 150 at Five Flags Speedway with Austin Vaughn driving the No. 34 Ford Fusion.

==== Car No. 34 results ====
ARCA Menards Series East results
Year	Driver	No.	Make	1	2	3	4	5	6	7	8	AMSEC	Pts	Ref
2025	Austin Vaughn	34	Ford	FIF; 15	CAR; 13	NSV; 14	FRS; 5	DOV; 14	IRP; 30	IOW		12th	239	
2025	Corey Aiken	34	Toyota								BRI; 28	12th	239	
2026	Brian Barbarow	34	Toyota	HCY; 18			TOL; 19		FRS; 11	IOW; 21		-*	-*	
2026	T. J. Harris	34	Toyota		CAR; 13							-*	-*	
2026	Ivis Earley	34	Toyota			NSV; 10		IRP; 28			BRI; 27	-*	-*	
