= Corey Aiken =

American racing driver (born 1978)

- Born: June 18, 1978 (age 48); Manchester, New Hampshire, U.S.

ARCA Menards Series career
- 6 races run over 2 years
- Best finish: 51st (2025)
- First race: 2025 Lime Rock Park 100 (Lime Rock)
- Last race: 2026 Lime Rock Park ARCA 100 (Lime Rock)
Wins	Top tens	Poles
0	0	0

ARCA Menards Series East career
- 3 races run over 1 year
- Best finish: 27th (2025)
- First race: 2025 Pensacola 150 (Pensacola)
- Last race: 2025 Bush's Beans 200 (Bristol)
Wins	Top tens	Poles
0	0	0
- Statistics up to date as of July 10, 2026.

Corey Aiken (born June 18, 1978) is an American professional stock car racing driver and commercial pilot. He last competed part-time in the ARCA Menards Series, driving the No. 19 Ford for Maples Motorsports in collaboration with WAV Racing.

== Racing career ==
In 2025, it was revealed that Aiken would participate in the pre-season test for the ARCA Menards Series at Daytona International Speedway, driving the No. 00 Toyota for Kennedy Aiken Racing. In March of that year, it was announced that Aiken would attempt to make his ARCA Menards Series East debut at Five Flags Speedway, this time driving for VWV Racing.

== Personal life ==
For 23 years, Aiken flew the C-5 Galaxy in the Air Force. He is currently a captain for Delta Air Lines. He has been married to his wife Lisa since April 2024.

== Motorsports results ==
=== ARCA Menards Series ===
(key) (Bold – Pole position awarded by qualifying time. Italics – Pole position earned by points standings or practice time. * – Most laps led.)

ARCA Menards Series results
Year	Team	No.	Make	1	2	3	4	5	6	7	8	9	10	11	12	13	14	15	16	17	18	19	20	AMSC	Pts	Ref
2025	VWV Racing	34	Ford	DAY	PHO	TAL	KAN	CLT	MCH	BLN	ELK	LRP; 16				GLN; 26	ISF	MAD	DSF					51st	87	
2025	Clubb Racing Inc.	86	Ford										DOV; 19	IRP	IOW									51st	87	
2025	VWV Racing	34	Toyota																	BRI; 28	SLM	KAN	TOL	51st	87	
2026	Maples Motorsports	19	Ford	DAY	PHO	KAN	TAL	GLN; 25	TOL	MCH	POC	BER	ELK	CHI	LRP; 26	IRP	IOW	ISF	MAD	DSF	SLM	BRI	KAN	87th	37	

==== ARCA Menards Series East ====
ARCA Menards Series East results
Year	Team	No.	Make	1	2	3	4	5	6	7	8	AMSEC	Pts	Ref
2025	VWV Racing	00	Toyota	FIF; 20	CAR; 25	NSV	FRS					27th	85	
2025	Clubb Racing Inc.	86	Ford					DOV; 19	IRP	IOW		27th	85	
2025	VWV Racing	34	Toyota								BRI; 28	27th	85	
