= Maples Motorsports =

American stock car racing team

- Owner: Michael Maples
- Series: ARCA Menards Series
- Race drivers: ARCA Menards Series: 1. Tony Cosentino, Nate Moeller, Andrew Patterson, Andrew Rocque, Kenna Long (part-time); 19. Greg Van Alst, Zachary Tinkle, Matt Kemp, Corey Aiken, Austin Vaughn, Morgen Baird, Kenna Long, Brad Perez (part-time); 34. Ryan Vargas (part-time); 91. Ryan Vargas, Tyler Kicera, Austin Vaughn, Ty Fredrickson, Shawn Allen Jr.; 99. Michael Maples
- Manufacturer: Chevrolet; Ford

Career
- Debut: 2025
- Races competed: 20
- Drivers' Championships: Total: 0 ARCA Menards Series: 0
- Race victories: 0
- Pole positions: 0

Maples Motorsports is an American professional auto racing team that currently competes in the ARCA Menards Series. The team currently fields the No. 1 car and the No. 19 car for multiple drivers part-time, the No. 34 car part-time, the No. 91 car full-time primarily for Ryan Vargas, and the No. 99 Chevrolet SS full-time for Michael Maples.

== History ==
On January 2, 2025, it was announced that the team would join the ARCA Menards Series for 2025 after Maples drove in the series for Fast Track Racing in 2024. It was also announced that Jeremy Petty will serve as the competition director.

== ARCA Menards Series ==
=== Car No. 1 results ===
ARCA Menards Series results
Year	Driver	No.	Make	1	2	3	4	5	6	7	8	9	10	11	12	13	14	15	16	17	18	19	20	AMSC	Pts
2026	Tony Cosentino	1	Ford	DAY; DNQ																				-*	-*
2026	Tony Cosentino	1	Chevy		PHO; 25																			-*	-*
2026	Nate Moeller	1	Chevy			KAN; 29																		-*	-*
2026	Andrew Patterson	1	Chevy				TAL; 28																	-*	-*
2026	Andrew Rocque	1	Chevy					GLN; 19																-*	-*
2026	Kenna Long	1	Chevy						TOL; 28	MCH	POC	BER	ELK	CHI	LRP	IRP	IOW	ISF	MAD	DSF	SLM	BRI	KAN	-*	-*

=== Car No. 19 results ===
ARCA Menards Series results
Year	Driver	No.	Make	1	2	3	4	5	6	7	8	9	10	11	12	13	14	15	16	17	18	19	20	AMSC	Pts
2026	Greg Van Alst	19	Chevy	DAY; DNQ																				-*	-*
2026	Zachary Tinkle	19	Chevy		PHO; 35																			-*	-*
2026	Matt Kemp	19	Chevy			KAN; 14	TAL; 23							CHI; 26										-*	-*
2026	Corey Aiken	19	Ford					GLN; 24							LRP; 26									-*	-*
2026	Austin Vaughn	19	Ford						TOL; 24							IRP; 14	IOW; 19							-*	-*
2026	Morgen Baird	19	Chevy							MCH; 22	POC	BER	ELK											-*	-*
2026	Kenna Long	19	Chevy															ISF; 22	MAD	DSF	SLM			-*	-*
2026	Brad Perez	19	Chevy																			BRI; 34	KAN	-*	-*

=== Car No. 67 results ===
ARCA Menards Series results
Year	Driver	No.	Make	1	2	3	4	5	6	7	8	9	10	11	12	13	14	15	16	17	18	19	20	AMSC	Pts
2025	Ryan Roulette	67	Ford	DAY; 9		TAL; 21		CLT; 26	MCH; 12				DOV; 17									KAN; 14		14th	703
2025	Ryan Vargas	67	Chevy		PHO; 32														DSF; 18		SLM; 10			14th	703
2025	Ryan Vargas	67	Ford				KAN; 10																	14th	703
2025	Mandy Chick	67	Chevy							BLN; 18														14th	703
2025	Casey Budd	67	Chevy								ELK; 19													14th	703
2025	Austin Vaughn	67	Chevy									LRP; 18			IOW; 18		ISF; 19							14th	703
2025	Austin Vaughn	67	Ford																	BRI; 23				14th	703
2025	Presley Sorah	67	Chevy											IRP; 28										14th	703
2025	Shane Backes	67	Chevy													GLN; 24		MAD; 17					TOL; 25	14th	703

=== Car No. 91 results ===
ARCA Menards Series results
Year	Driver	No.	Make	1	2	3	4	5	6	7	8	9	10	11	12	13	14	15	16	17	18	19	20	AMSC	Pts
2026	Ryan Vargas	91	Ford	DAY; 8	PHO; 17	KAN; 11	TAL; 8			MCH; 12	POC; 10					IRP; PR	IOW; 9							-*	-*
2026	Tyler Kicera	91	Ford					GLN; 12																-*	-*
2026	Ryan Vargas	91	Chevy						TOL; 9											DSF; 10				-*	-*
2026	Austin Vaughn	91	Ford									BER; 20	ELK; 10						MAD; 12		SLM; 9	BRI; 18	KAN; 25	-*	-*
2026	Morgen Baird	91	Ford											CHI; 14										-*	-*
2026	Ty Fredrickson	91	Ford												LRP; 15									-*	-*
2026	Michael Maples	91	Ford													IRP; 29								-*	-*
2026	Shawn Allen Jr.	91	Ford															ISF; 11						-*	-*

=== Car No. 99 results ===
ARCA Menards Series results
Year	Driver	No.	Make	1	2	3	4	5	6	7	8	9	10	11	12	13	14	15	16	17	18	19	20	AMSC	Pts
2025	Michael Maples	99	Chevy	DAY; 31	PHO; 21	TAL; 31	KAN; 12	CLT; 17	MCH; 15	BER; 13	ELK; 14	LRP; 13	DOV; 13	IRP; 29	IOW; 16	GLN; 18	ISF; 15	MAD; 15	DSF; 9	BRI; 20	SLM; 15	KAN; 22	TOL; 12	11th	729
2026	Michael Maples	99	Chevy	DAY; 12	PHO; 20	KAN; 16	TAL; 25	GLN; 20	TOL; 26	MCH; 16	POC; 18	BER; 14	ELK; 19	CHI; 21	LRP; 23	IRP; Wth	IOW; 20	ISF; 20	MAD; 18	DSF; 21	SLM; 14	BRI; 26	KAN; 15		

== ARCA Menards Series East ==
=== Car No. 1 results ===
ARCA Menards Series East results
Year	Team	No.	Make	1	2	3	4	5	6	7	8	AMSEC	Pts
2026	Kenna Long	1	Chevy	HCY	CAR	NSV	TOL; 28	IRP	FRS	IOW	BRI	-*	-*

=== Car No. 19 results ===
ARCA Menards Series East results
Year	Team	No.	Make	1	2	3	4	5	6	7	8	AMSEC	Pts
2026	Austin Vaughn	19	Ford	HCY; 10	CAR; 14	NSV; 14	TOL; 24	IRP; 14	FRS; 7	IOW; 19		-*	-*
2026	Brad Perez	19	Chevy								BRI; 34	-*	-*

=== Car No. 67 results ===
ARCA Menards Series East results
Year	Team	No.	Make	1	2	3	4	5	6	7	8	AMSEC	Pts
2025	Ryan Roulette	67	Ford	FIF	CAR	NSH	FRS	DOV; 17				26th	140
2025	Presley Sorah	67	Chevy						IRP; 28			26th	140
2025	Austin Vaughn	67	Chevy							IOW; 18		26th	140
2025	Austin Vaughn	67	Ford								BRI; 23	26th	140

=== Car No. 91 results ===
ARCA Menards Series East results
Year	Team	No.	Make	1	2	3	4	5	6	7	8	AMSEC	Pts
2026	Ryan Vargas	91	Chevy	HCY	CAR	NSV	TOL; 9					-*	-*
2026	Ryan Vargas	91	Ford					IRP; PR		IOW; 9		-*	-*
2026	Michael Maples	91	Ford					IRP; 29				-*	-*
2026	Matt Kemp	91	Chevy						FRS; 4			-*	-*
2026	Austin Vaughn	91	Ford								BRI; 18	-*	-*

=== Car No. 99 results ===
ARCA Menards Series East results
Year	Team	No.	Make	1	2	3	4	5	6	7	8	AMSEC	Pts
2025	Michael Maples	99	Chevy	FIF	CAR	NSH	FRS	DOV; 13	IRP; 29	IOW; 16	BRI; 20	23rd	148
2026	Michael Maples	99	Chevy	HCY; 17	CAR; 19	NSV; 18	TOL; 26	IRP; Wth	FRS; 21	IOW; 20	BRI; 26	-*	-*

== ARCA Menards Series West ==
=== Car No. 1 results ===
ARCA Menards Series West results
Year	Team	No.	Make	1	2	3	4	5	6	7	8	9	10	11	12	13	AMSWC	Pts
2026	Tony Cosentino	1	Chevy	KER	PHO; 25	TUC	SHA	CNS	TRI	SON	PIR	AAS	MAD	LVS	PHO	KER	-*	-*

=== Car No. 19 results ===
ARCA Menards Series West results
Year	Team	No.	Make	1	2	3	4	5	6	7	8	9	10	11	12	13	AMSWC	Pts
2026	Zachary Tinkle	19	Chevy	KER	PHO; 35	TUC	SHA	CNS	TRI	SON	PIR	AAS	MAD	LVS	PHO	KER	-*	-*

=== Car No. 67 results ===
ARCA Menards Series West results
Year	Team	No.	Make	1	2	3	4	5	6	7	8	9	10	11	12	AMSWC	Pts
2025	Ryan Vargas	67	Chevy	KER	PHO; 32	TUC	CNS	KER	SON	TRI	PIR	AAS	MAD			22nd	112
2025	Shane Backes	67	Chevy											LVS; 14	PHO; 24	22nd	112

=== Car No. 91 results ===
ARCA Menards Series West results
Year	Team	No.	Make	1	2	3	4	5	6	7	8	9	10	11	12	13	AMSWC	Pts
2026	Ryan Vargas	91	Ford	KER	PHO; 17	TUC	SHA	CNS	TRI	SON	PIR	AAS	MAD	LVS	PHO	KER	-*	-*

=== Car No. 99 results ===
ARCA Menards Series West results
Year	Team	No.	Make	1	2	3	4	5	6	7	8	9	10	11	12	13	AMSWC	Pts
2025	Michael Maples	99	Chevy	KER	PHO; 21	TUC	CNS	KER	SON	TRI	PIR	AAS	MAD	LVS; 21	PHO; 26		21st	114
2026	Michael Maples	99	Chevy	KER	PHO; 20	TUC	SHA	CNS	TRI	SON	PIR	AAS	MAD	LVS	PHO	KER	-*	-*
