= 2025 Lime Rock Park 100 =

9th race of the 2025 ARCA Menards Series

Race details
- Race 9 of 20 of the 2025 ARCA Menards Series
- Date: June 28, 2025
- Official name: 1st Annual Lime Rock Park 100
- Location: Lime Rock Park in Lakeville, Connecticut
- Course: Permanent racing facility
- Course length: 1.530 miles (2.426 km)
- Distance: 68 laps, 100 mi (160 km)
- Scheduled distance: 68 laps, 100 mi (160 km)

Pole position
Driver	Thomas Annunziata	Nitro Motorsports
- Time: 54.193

Most laps led
Driver	Thomas Annunziata	Nitro Motorsports
- Laps: 32

Winner
No. 70	Thomas Annunziata	Nitro Motorsports

Television in the United States
- Network: FS2
- Announcers: Eric Brennan, Phil Parsons and Trevor Bayne

Radio in the United States
- Radio: MRN

The 2025 Lime Rock Park 100 was the 9th stock car race of the 2025 ARCA Menards Series, and the 1st iteration of the event. The race was held on Saturday, June 28, 2025, at Lime Rock Park in Lakeville, Connecticut, a 1.530 miles (2.462 km) permanent asphalt road course. The race took the scheduled 68 laps to complete. Thomas Annunziata, driving for Nitro Motorsports, would recover from a first-lap, first-corner spin with Brent Crews, driving for Joe Gibbs Racing, and took the lead from Lawless Alan, driving for Venturini Motorsports, with 33 laps to go to earn his first career ARCA Menards Series win in his fifth start. To fill out the podium, Alon Day and Alan, both driving for Venturini Motorsports, would finish 2nd and 3rd, respectively.

Crews, who was also recovering from his first-lap spin, started 2nd alongside Annunziata on a late restart with 18 laps to go. As he was battling Annunziata for the race lead, ARCA officials ruled that Crews had jumped the restart and was forced to pit. He was relegated to a 6th-place finish.

== Report ==
=== Entry list ===
- (R) denotes rookie driver.

#	Driver	Team	Make	Sponsor
03	Alex Clubb	Clubb Racing Inc.	Ford	Race Parts Liquidators
3	Jeff Anton	1/4 Ley Racing	Chevrolet	Squid Decals / Deer Park Recycling
4	Dale Quarterley	1/4 Ley Racing	Chevrolet	Van Dyk Recycling Solutions
06	Brayton Laster (R)	Wayne Peterson Racing	Chevrolet	Atlanta Phoenix Guard / Casella
6	Lavar Scott	Rev Racing	Chevrolet	Max Siegel Inc.
9	Nate Moeller	Fast Track Racing	Ford	Fast Track Racing
10	Ed Pompa	Fast Track Racing	Toyota	HYTORC of New York / Double "H" Ranch
11	Mike Basham	Fast Track Racing	Toyota	Universal Technical Institute
12	Trevor Ward	Fast Track Racing	Toyota	Fast Track Racing
18	Brent Crews	Joe Gibbs Racing	Toyota	Mobil 1
20	Lawless Alan	Venturini Motorsports	Toyota	AutoParkIt.com
25	Alon Day	Venturini Motorsports	Toyota	JSSI
28	Brenden Queen (R)	Pinnacle Racing Group	Chevrolet	BestRepair.net
29	Ryan Gemmell	NEMCO Motorsports	Toyota	TC3 Turf / Multibuilding Inc.
31	Tim Goulet	Rise Motorsports	Toyota	risemotorsports.com
34	Corey Aiken	VWV Racing	Ford	Vaughn, Wilcox & Vaughn
48	Brad Smith	Brad Smith Motorsports	Ford	Gary's Speed Shop
55	Isabella Robusto (R)	Venturini Motorsports	Toyota	Yahoo
67	Austin Vaughn	Maples Motorsports	Chevrolet	Maples Motorsports
70	Thomas Annunziata	Nitro Motorsports	Toyota	Toyota Gazoo Racing
73	Glen Reen	KLAS Motorsports	Chevrolet	New Wave Home
86	Jeff Maconi	Clubb Racing Inc.	Ford	Maconi Setup Shop / Casella
97	Jason Kitzmiller	CR7 Motorsports	Chevrolet	A.L.L. Construction / Carter Cat
99	Michael Maples	Maples Motorsports	Chevrolet	Don Ray Petroleum / Maples Motorsports
Official entry list

== Practice ==
The first and only practice session was held on Friday, June 27, at 2:30 PM EST, and would last for 60 minutes. Brent Crews, driving for Joe Gibbs Racing, would set the fastest lap of the session, with a time of 54.482, and a speed of 97.662 mph (157.172 km/h).

Pos.	#	Driver	Team	Make	Time	Speed
1	18	Brent Crews	Joe Gibbs Racing	Toyota	54.482	97.662
2	20	Lawless Alan	Venturini Motorsports	Toyota	54.550	97.540
3	25	Alon Day	Venturini Motorsports	Toyota	54.612	97.429
Full practice results

== Qualifying ==
Qualifying was held on Friday, June 27, at 3:45 PM EST. The qualifying procedure used is a multi-car, multi-lap based system. All drivers will be on track for a 20-minute timed session, and whoever sets the fastest time in the session will win the pole.

Thomas Annunziata, driving for Nitro Motorsports, would score the pole for the race, with a lap of 54.193, and a speed of 98.182 mph (158.009 km/h).

=== Qualifying results ===
Pos.	#	Driver	Team	Make	Time	Speed
1	70	Thomas Annunziata	Nitro Motorsports	Toyota	54.193	98.182
2	18	Brent Crews	Joe Gibbs Racing	Toyota	54.320	97.953
3	20	Lawless Alan	Venturini Motorsports	Toyota	54.423	97.767
4	25	Alon Day	Venturini Motorsports	Toyota	54.555	97.531
5	28	Brenden Queen (R)	Pinnacle Racing Group	Chevrolet	55.063	96.631
6	29	Ryan Gemmell	NEMCO Motorsports	Toyota	55.106	96.556
7	4	Dale Quarterley	1/4 Ley Racing	Chevrolet	55.297	96.222
8	55	Isabella Robusto (R)	Venturini Motorsports	Toyota	55.372	96.092
9	6	Lavar Scott	Rev Racing	Chevrolet	55.650	95.612
10	73	Glen Reen	KLAS Motorsports	Chevrolet	55.665	95.586
11	3	Jeff Anton	1/4 Ley Racing	Chevrolet	55.955	95.091
12	97	Jason Kitzmiller	CR7 Motorsports	Chevrolet	56.396	94.347
13	10	Ed Pompa	Fast Track Racing	Toyota	1:01.616	86.354
14	34	Corey Aiken	VWV Racing	Ford	1:02.059	85.738
15	11	Mike Basham	Fast Track Racing	Toyota	1:02.280	85.434
16	06	Brayton Laster (R)	Wayne Peterson Racing	Chevrolet	1:03.204	84.185
17	99	Michael Maples	Maples Motorsports	Chevrolet	1:03.389	83.939
18	12	Trevor Ward	Fast Track Racing	Toyota	1:05.440	81.308
19	31	Tim Goulet	Rise Motorsports	Toyota	1:06.400	80.133
20	03	Alex Clubb	Clubb Racing Inc.	Ford	1:06.686	79.789
21	67	Austin Vaughn	Maples Motorsports	Chevrolet	1:09.089	77.014
22	86	Jeff Maconi	Clubb Racing Inc.	Ford	1:09.544	76.510
23	9	Nate Moeller	Fast Track Racing	Ford	1:12.320	73.573
24	48	Brad Smith	Brad Smith Motorsports	Ford	1:15.235	70.722
Official qualifying results

== Race results ==
Pos.	St.	#	Driver	Team	Make	Laps	Led	Status	Pts
1	1	70	Thomas Annunziata	Nitro Motorsports	Toyota	68	32	Running	49
2	4	25	Alon Day	Venturini Motorsports	Toyota	68	19	Running	43
3	3	20	Lawless Alan	Venturini Motorsports	Toyota	68	15	Running	42
4	5	28	Brenden Queen (R)	Pinnacle Racing Group	Chevrolet	68	2	Running	41
5	6	29	Ryan Gemmell	NEMCO Motorsports	Toyota	68	0	Running	39
6	2	18	Brent Crews	Joe Gibbs Racing	Toyota	68	0	Running	38
7	9	6	Lavar Scott	Rev Racing	Chevrolet	68	0	Running	37
8	11	3	Jeff Anton	Mullins Racing	Chevrolet	68	0	Running	36
9	7	4	Dale Quarterley	1/4 Ley Racing	Chevrolet	68	0	Running	35
10	8	55	Isabella Robusto (R)	Venturini Motorsports	Toyota	68	0	Running	34
11	15	11	Mike Basham	Fast Track Racing	Toyota	67	0	Running	33
12	20	03	Alex Clubb	Clubb Racing Inc.	Ford	62	0	Running	32
13	17	99	Michael Maples	Maples Motorsports	Chevrolet	61	0	Running	31
14	19	31	Tim Goulet	Rise Motorsports	Toyota	58	0	Running	30
15	16	06	Brayton Laster (R)	Wayne Peterson Racing	Chevrolet	56	0	Running	29
16	14	34	Corey Aiken	VWV Racing	Ford	52	0	Running	28
17	22	86	Jeff Maconi	Clubb Racing Inc.	Ford	28	0	Mechanical	27
18	21	67	Austin Vaughn	Maples Motorsports	Ford	24	0	Mechanical	26
19	12	97	Jason Kitzmiller	CR7 Motorsports	Chevrolet	17	0	Accident	25
20	13	10	Ed Pompa	Fast Track Racing	Toyota	16	0	Accident	24
21	13	73	Glen Reen	KLAS Motorsports	Chevrolet	15	0	Mechanical	23
22	18	12	Trevor Ward	Fast Track Racing	Toyota	9	0	Mechanical	22
23	23	9	Nate Moeller	Fast Track Racing	Ford	8	0	Mechanical	21
24	24	48	Brad Smith	Brad Smith Motorsports	Ford	6	0	Mechanical	20
Official race results

== Standings after the race ==
Drivers' Championship standings

	Pos	Driver	Points
	1	Brenden Queen	412
	2	Lawless Alan	403 (–9)
	3	Lavar Scott	395 (–17)
	4	Jason Kitzmiller	332 (–80)
	5	Isabella Robusto	306 (–106)
1	6	Alex Clubb	291 (–121)
1	7	Michael Maples	279 (–133)
1	8	Brayton Laster	267 (–145)
3	9	Andy Jankowiak	262 (–150)
	10	Thad Moffitt	227 (–185)

- Note: Only the first 10 positions are included for the driver standings.

Previous race: 2025 Shore Lunch 250	ARCA Menards Series; 2025 season	Next race: 2025 General Tire 150 (Dover)
