= 2025 Bush's Beans 200 =

Final 2025 ARCA Menards Series and ARCA Menards Series East combination race

Race details
- Race 17 of 20 of the 2025 ARCA Menards Series; Race 8 of 8 of the 2025 ARCA Menards Series East
- Date: September 11, 2025
- Official name: 6th Annual Bush's Beans 200
- Location: Bristol Motor Speedway in Bristol, Tennessee
- Course: Permanent racing facility
- Course length: 0.553 miles (0.858 km)
- Distance: 204 laps, 108 mi (175 km)
- Scheduled distance: 200 laps, 106 mi (171 km)
- Average speed: 82.651 mph (133.014 km/h)

Pole position
Driver	Brent Crews	Joe Gibbs Racing
- Time: 15.076

Most laps led
Driver	Brent Crews	Joe Gibbs Racing
- Laps: 204

Winner
No. 18	Brent Crews	Joe Gibbs Racing

Television in the United States
- Network: FS1
- Announcers: Eric Brennan, Phil Parsons, and Austin Cindric

Radio in the United States
- Radio: MRN

The 2025 Bush's Beans 200 was the 17th stock car race of the 2025 ARCA Menards Series season, the 8th and final race of the 2025 ARCA Menards Series East season, and the 6th iteration of the event. The race was held on Thursday, September 11, 2025, at Bristol Motor Speedway in Bristol, Tennessee, a 0.553 mile (0.858 km) permanent oval shaped racetrack. The race was contested over 204 laps, extended from 200 laps due to a green-white-checkered finish. Brent Crews, driving for Joe Gibbs Racing, was able to pull off a dominating performance, leading every lap from the pole position to earn his sixth career ARCA Menards Series win, his third career ARCA Menards Series East win, and his fifth win of the season. With his win, he clinched the 2025 East Series owner's championship for JGR. To fill out the podium, Tristan McKee and Brenden Queen, both driving for Pinnacle Racing Group, would finish 2nd and 3rd, respectively.

With an eighth-place finish, Isaac Kitzmiller of ACR Motorsports clinched the 2025 ARCA Menards Series East championship, 17 points ahead of Tyler Reif. This was Kitzmiller's first championship, and the first for his family-owned ACR Motorsports.

== Report ==
=== Background ===
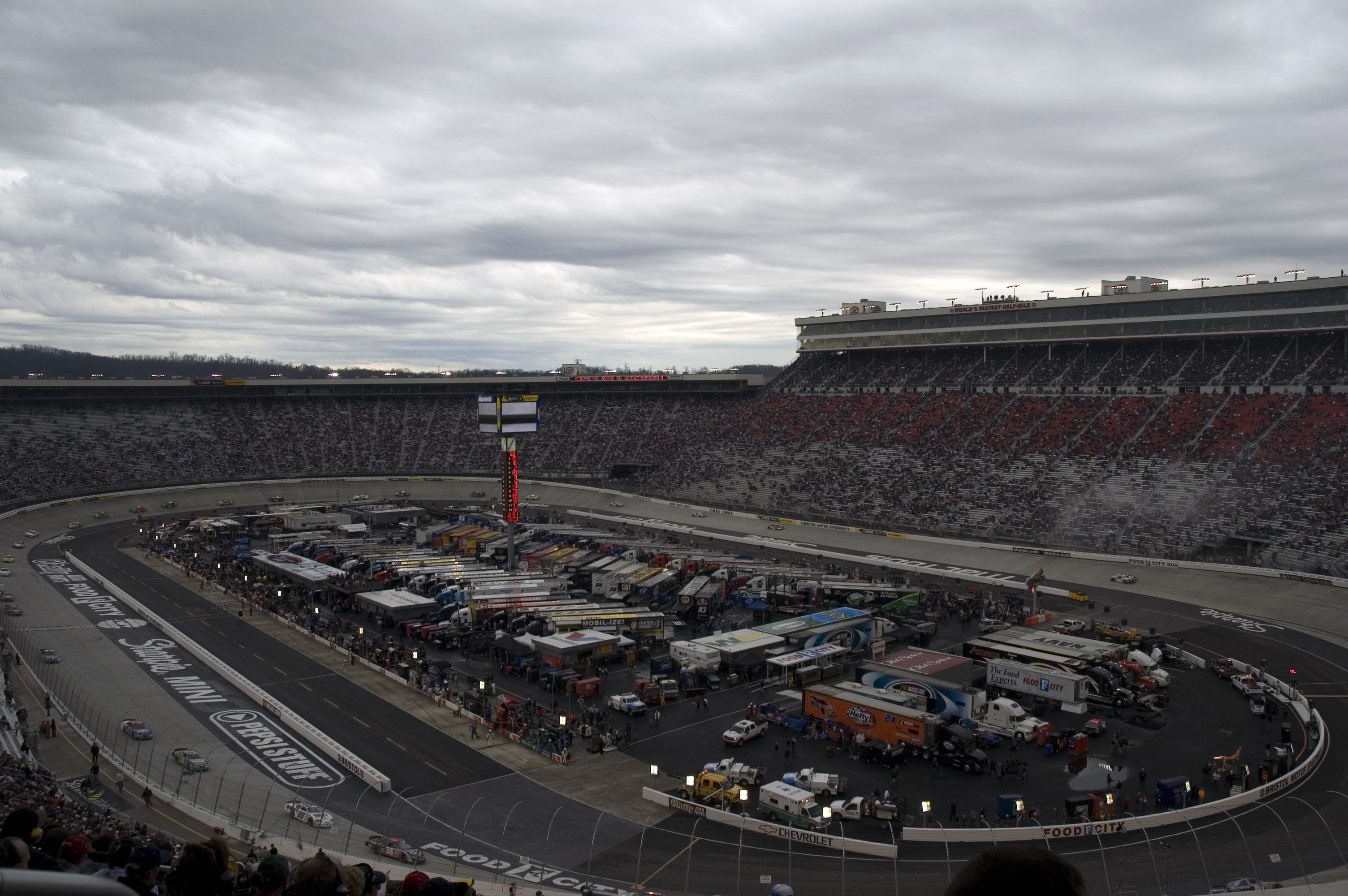
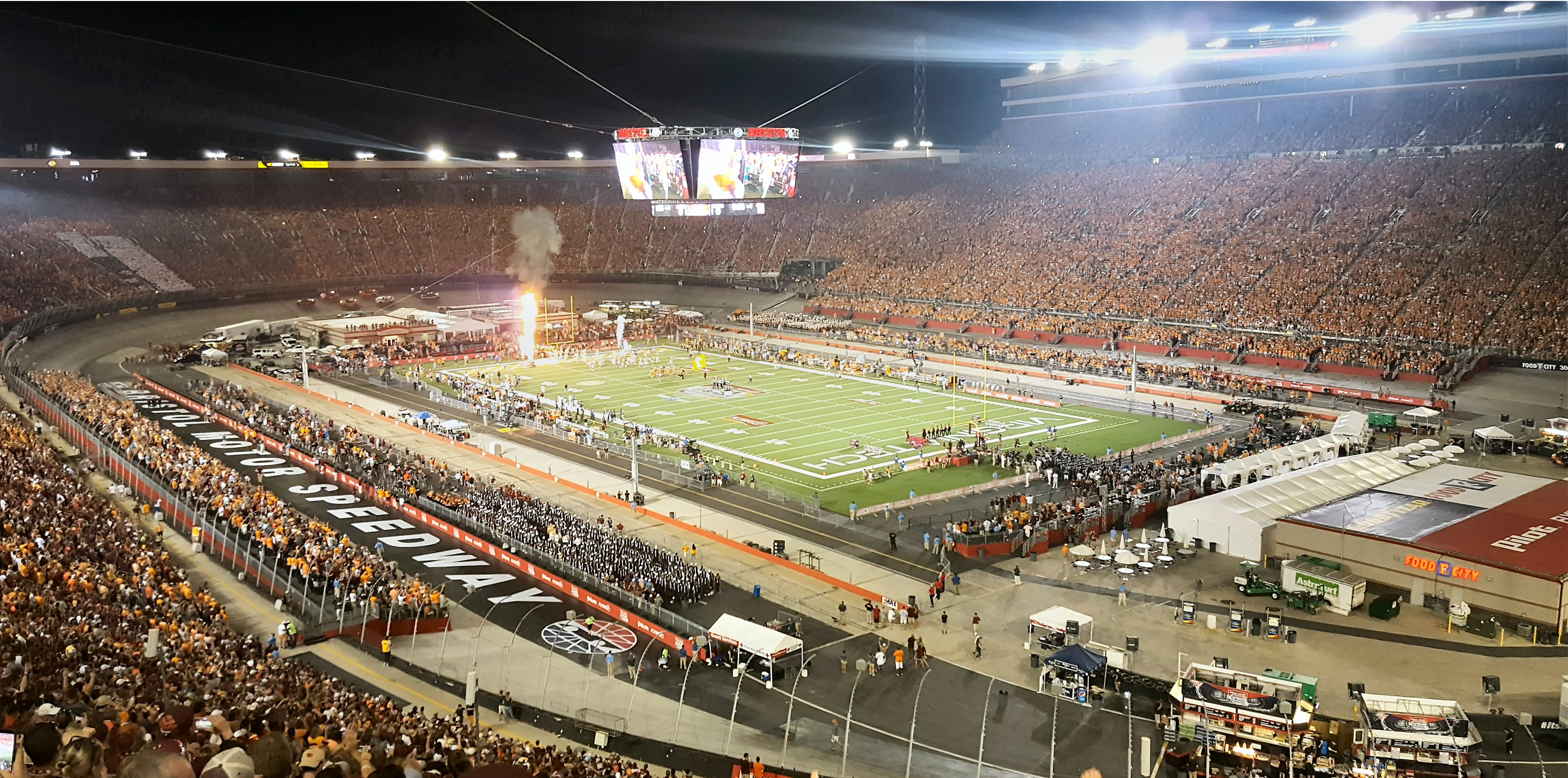
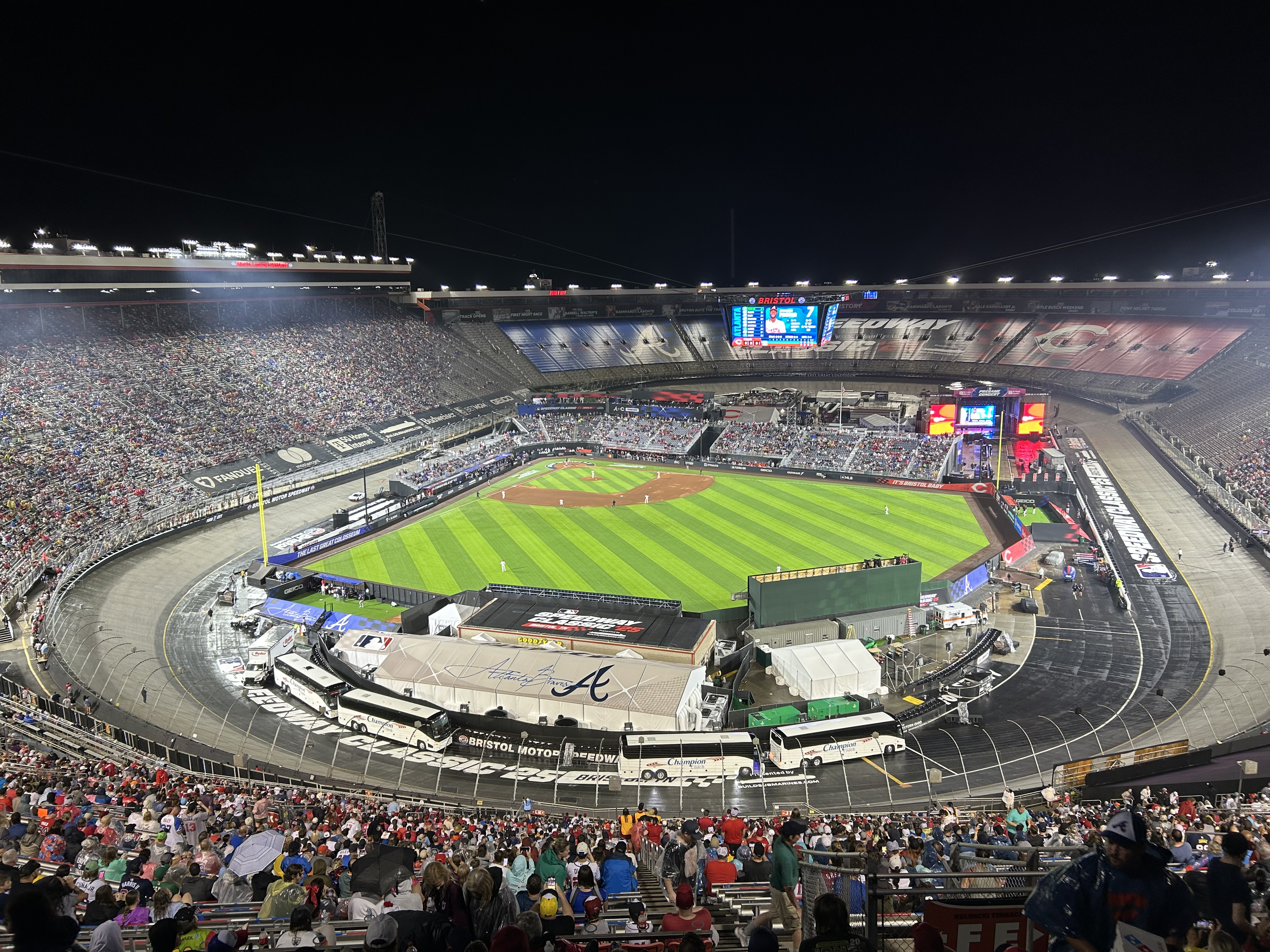
The Track (left) the Battle at Bristol (center) and the MLB Speedway Classic (right), are all events previously held at Bristol Motor Speedway.

The Bristol Motor Speedway, formerly known as Bristol International Raceway and Bristol Raceway, is a NASCAR short track venue located in Bristol, Tennessee. Constructed in 1960, it held its first NASCAR race on July 30, 1961. Despite its short length, Bristol is among the most popular tracks on the NASCAR schedule because of its distinct features, which include extraordinarily steep banking, an all concrete surface, two pit roads, and stadium-like seating. It has also been named one of the loudest NASCAR tracks.

Besides holding racing events, the track has hosted the Battle at Bristol, a college football game between the Tennessee Volunteers and Virginia Tech Hokies on September 10, 2016 and the MLB Speedway Classic, an MLB baseball game between the Atlanta Braves and the Cincinnati Reds from August 2-3, 2025.

==== Entry list ====
- (R) denotes rookie driver.

#	Driver	Team	Make
0	Con Nicolopoulos	Wayne Peterson Racing	Toyota
01	Mike Basham	Fast Track Racing	Toyota
2	Lanie Buice	Rev Racing	Chevrolet
03	Josh White	Clubb Racing Inc.	Ford
06	Brayton Laster (R)	Wayne Peterson Racing	Toyota
6	Lavar Scott	Rev Racing	Chevrolet
9	Logan Misuraca	Rev Racing	Chevrolet
10	Tony Cosentino	Fast Track Racing	Ford
11	Zachary Tinkle	Fast Track Racing	Toyota
12	Takuma Koga	Fast Track Racing	Toyota
15	Jake Finch	Venturini Motorsports	Toyota
18	Brent Crews (R)	Joe Gibbs Racing	Toyota
20	Leland Honeyman	Venturini Motorsports	Toyota
23	Tyler Reif	Sigma Performance Services	Chevrolet
25	Patrick Staropoli	Venturini Motorsports	Toyota
27	Tim Richmond	Richmond Motorsports	Toyota
28	Brenden Queen (R)	Pinnacle Racing Group	Chevrolet
30	Garrett Mitchell	Rette Jones Racing	Ford
31	Bobby Dale Earnhardt	Rise Motorsports	Toyota
34	Corey Aiken	VWV Racing	Toyota
40	Andrew Patterson	Andrew Patterson Racing	Chevrolet
48	Brad Smith	Brad Smith Motorsports	Ford
51	Carson Ware	Rick Ware Racing	Chevrolet
55	Isabella Robusto (R)	Venturini Motorsports	Toyota
56	Timmy Hill	Hill Motorsports	Toyota
67	Austin Vaughn (R)	VWV Racing	Ford
70	Thomas Annunziata	Nitro Motorsports	Toyota
73	Andy Jankowiak	KLAS Motorsports	Toyota
79	Isaac Kitzmiller (R)	ACR Motorsports	Chevrolet
82	Tristan McKee	Spire Motorsports	Chevrolet
86	Alex Clubb	Clubb Racing Inc.	Ford
95	Jackson McLerran	MAN Motorsports	Toyota
97	Jason Kitzmiller	CR7 Motorsports	Chevrolet
99	Michael Maples	Maples Motorsports	Chevrolet
Official entry list

== Practice ==
The first and only practice session was held on Thursday, September 11, at 1:00 PM EST, and would last for 45 minutes. Brent Crews, driving for Joe Gibbs Racing, would set the fastest time in the session, with a lap of 15.092, and a speed of 127.140 mph (204.612 km/h).

Pos.	#	Driver	Team	Make	Time	Speed
1	18	Brent Crews (R)	Joe Gibbs Racing	Toyota	15.092	127.140
2	28	Brenden Queen (R)	Pinnacle Racing Group	Chevrolet	15.137	126.762
3	82	Tristan McKee	Pinnacle Racing Group	Chevrolet	15.223	126.046
Full practice results

== Qualifying ==
Qualifying was held on Thursday, September 11, at 2:00 PM EST. The qualifying procedure used is a multi-car, multi-lap based system. All drivers will be on track for a 20-minute timed session, and whoever sets the fastest time in that session will win the pole.

Brent Crews, driving for Joe Gibbs Racing, would score the pole for the race, with a lap of 15.076, and a speed of 127.275 mph (204.829 km/h).

=== Qualifying results ===
Pos.	#	Driver	Team	Make	Time	Speed
1	18	Brent Crews (R)	Joe Gibbs Racing	Toyota	15.076	127.275
2	28	Brenden Queen (R)	Pinnacle Racing Group	Chevrolet	15.169	126.495
3	2	Lanie Buice	Rev Racing	Chevrolet	15.242	125.889
4	23	Tyler Reif	Sigma Performance Services	Chevrolet	15.253	125.798
5	6	Lavar Scott	Rev Racing	Chevrolet	15.332	125.150
6	82	Tristan McKee	Pinnacle Racing Group	Chevrolet	15.339	125.093
7	15	Jake Finch	Venturini Motorsports	Toyota	15.341	125.077
8	20	Leland Honeyman	Venturini Motorsports	Toyota	15.352	124.987
9	79	Isaac Kitzmiller (R)	ACR Motorsports	Chevrolet	15.375	124.800
10	25	Patrick Staropoli	Venturini Motorsports	Toyota	15.406	124.549
11	70	Thomas Annunziata	Nitro Motorsports	Toyota	15.420	124.436
12	97	Jason Kitzmiller	CR7 Motorsports	Chevrolet	15.573	123.213
13	56	Timmy Hill	Hill Motorsports	Toyota	15.619	122.850
14	51	Carson Ware	Rick Ware Racing	Chevrolet	15.633	122.740
15	9	Logan Misuraca	Rev Racing	Chevrolet	15.802	121.428
16	73	Andy Jankowiak	KLAS Motorsports	Toyota	15.905	120.641
17	27	Tim Richmond	Richmond Motorsports	Toyota	15.914	120.573
18	40	Andrew Patterson	Andrew Patterson Racing	Chevrolet	15.997	119.947
19	95	Jackson McLerran	MAN Motorsports	Toyota	16.075	119.365
20	30	Garrett Mitchell	Rette Jones Racing	Ford	16.083	119.306
21	10	Tony Cosentino	Fast Track Racing	Ford	16.139	118.892
22	99	Michael Maples	Maples Motorsports	Chevrolet	16.391	117.064
23	11	Zachary Tinkle	Fast Track Racing	Toyota	16.395	117.036
24	31	Bobby Dale Earnhardt	Rise Motorsports	Toyota	16.597	115.611
25	12	Takuma Koga	Fast Track Racing	Toyota	16.729	114.699
26	67	Austin Vaughn (R)	Maples Motorsports	Ford	17.501	109.639
27	48	Brad Smith	Brad Smith Motorsports	Ford	17.649	108.720
28	86	Alex Clubb	Clubb Racing Inc.	Ford	17.671	108.585
29	0	Con Nicolopoulos	Wayne Peterson Racing	Toyota	17.776	107.943
30	34	Corey Aiken	VWV Racing	Toyota	18.089	106.076
31	06	Brayton Laster (R)	Wayne Peterson Racing	Toyota	18.517	103.624
32	01	Mike Basham	Fast Track Racing	Toyota	18.588	103.228
33	03	Josh White	Clubb Racing Inc.	Ford	20.737	92.530
34	55	Isabella Robusto (R)	Venturini Motorsports	Toyota	–	–
Official qualifying results

== Race results ==
Fin	St	#	Driver	Team	Make	Laps	Led	Status	Pts
1	1	18	Brent Crews (R)	Joe Gibbs Racing	Toyota	204	204	Running	98
2	6	82	Tristan McKee	Pinnacle Racing Group	Chevrolet	204	0	Running	42
3	2	28	Brenden Queen (R)	Pinnacle Racing Group	Chevrolet	204	0	Running	91
4	8	20	Leland Honeyman	Venturini Motorsports	Toyota	204	0	Running	40
5	11	70	Thomas Annunziata	Nitro Motorsports	Toyota	204	0	Running	39
6	4	23	Tyler Reif	Sigma Performance Services	Chevrolet	204	0	Running	88
7	7	15	Jake Finch	Venturini Motorsports	Toyota	204	0	Running	37
8	9	79	Isaac Kitzmiller (R)	ACR Motorsports	Chevrolet	204	0	Running	86
9	12	97	Jason Kitzmiller	CR7 Motorsports	Chevrolet	204	0	Running	85
10	10	25	Patrick Staropoli	Venturini Motorsports	Toyota	204	0	Running	34
11	5	6	Lavar Scott	Rev Racing	Chevrolet	203	0	Running	83
12	3	2	Lanie Buice	Rev Racing	Chevrolet	203	0	Running	32
13	18	40	Andrew Patterson	Andrew Patterson Racing	Chevrolet	202	0	Running	31
14	16	73	Andy Jankowiak	KLAS Motorsports	Toyota	200	0	Running	30
15	14	51	Carson Ware	Rick Ware Racing	Chevrolet	199	0	Running	29
16	17	27	Tim Richmond	Richmond Motorsports	Toyota	199	0	Running	28
17	20	30	Garrett Mitchell	Rette Jones Racing	Ford	197	0	Running	27
18	21	10	Tony Cosentino	Fast Track Racing	Ford	195	0	Mechanical	76
19	13	56	Timmy Hill	Hill Motorsports	Toyota	192	0	Accident	25
20	22	99	Michael Maples	Maples Motorsports	Chevrolet	189	0	Running	74
21	28	86	Alex Clubb	Clubb Racing Inc.	Ford	185	0	Running	73
22	27	48	Brad Smith	Brad Smith Motorsports	Ford	185	0	Running	72
23	26	67	Austin Vaughn (R)	Maples Motorsports	Ford	184	0	Running	21
24	33	0	Con Nicolopoulos	Wayne Peterson Racing	Toyota	184	0	Running	20
25	15	9	Logan Misuraca	Rev Racing	Chevrolet	171	0	Running	19
26	19	95	Jackson McLerran	MAN Motorsports	Toyota	144	0	Mechanical	18
27	29	55	Isabella Robusto (R)	Venturini Motorsports	Toyota	129	0	Mechanical	67
28	31	34	Corey Aiken	VWV Racing	Toyota	129	0	Mechanical	16
29	30	06	Brayton Laster (R)	Wayne Peterson Racing	Toyota	127	0	Mechanical	65
30	24	31	Bobby Dale Earnhardt	Rise Motorsports	Toyota	85	0	Accident	14
31	23	11	Zachary Tinkle	Fast Track Racing	Toyota	70	0	Mechanical	63
32	32	03	Josh White	Clubb Racing Inc.	Ford	49	0	Mechanical	12
33	25	12	Takuma Koga	Fast Track Racing	Toyota	34	0	Accident	61
34	34	01	Mike Basham	Fast Track Racing	Toyota	3	0	Mechanical	10
Official race results

== Standings after the race ==
Drivers' Championship standings (ARCA Main)

	Pos	Driver	Points
	1	Brenden Queen	846
	2	Lavar Scott	796 (–50)
	3	Lawless Alan	744 (–102)
1	4	Jason Kitzmiller	701 (–145)
1	5	Isabella Robusto	683 (–163)
	6	Alex Clubb	614 (–232)
	7	Michael Maples	596 (–250)
	8	Brayton Laster	571 (–275)
	9	Brad Smith	451 (–395)
	10	Brent Crews	364 (–482)

Drivers' Championship standings (ARCA East)

	Pos	Driver	Points
	1	Isaac Kitzmiller	405
	2	Tyler Reif	388 (–17)
	3	Zachary Tinkle	352 (–53)
	4	Takuma Koga	315 (–90)
1	5	Brad Smith	293 (–112)
1	6	Austin Vaughn	270 (–135)
	7	Brent Crews	261 (–144)
2	8	Brenden Queen	231 (–174)
1	9	Lavar Scott	229 (–176)
6	10	Jason Kitzmiller	191 (–214)

- Note: Only the first 10 positions are included for the driver standings.

Previous race: 2025 Southern Illinois 100	ARCA Menards Series; 2025 season	Next race: 2025 Kentuckiana Ford Dealers ARCA 200

Previous race: 2025 Atlas 150	ARCA Menards Series East; 2025 season	Next race: 2026 Cook Out 200
