= 2025 Shore Lunch 250 =

8th race of the 2025 ARCA Menards Series

2025 Shore Lunch 250 presented by Dutch Boy Paints
Race details
- Race 8 of 20 of the 2025 ARCA Menards Series
- Date: June 21, 2025
- Official name: 10th Annual Shore Lunch 250 presented by Dutch Boy Paints
- Location: Elko Speedway in Elko New Market, Minnesota
- Course: Permanent racing facility
- Course length: 0.375 miles (0.604 km)
- Distance: 250 laps, 93 mi (150 km)
- Scheduled distance: 250 laps, 93 mi (150 km)
- Average speed: 64.261 mph (103.418 km/h)

Pole position
Driver	Brenden Queen	Pinnacle Racing Group
- Time: 14.716

Most laps led
Driver	Brenden Queen	Pinnacle Racing Group
- Laps: 148

Winner
No. 18	Max Reaves	Joe Gibbs Racing

Television in the United States
- Network: FS2
- Announcers: Brent Stover and Phil Parsons

Radio in the United States
- Radio: ARCA Racing Network

The 2025 Shore Lunch 250 presented by Dutch Boy Paints was the 8th stock car race of the 2025 ARCA Menards Series season, and the 10th iteration of the event. The race was held on Saturday, June 21, 2025, at Elko Speedway in Elko New Market, Minnesota, a 0.375 miles (0.604 km) permanent oval shaped racetrack. The race took the scheduled 250 laps to complete. Max Reaves, driving for Joe Gibbs Racing, would make a late charge to the lead from Lavar Scott with 46 laps to go, and led the remaining laps to earn his first career ARCA Menards Series win in his second start. To fill out the podium, Brenden Queen, driving for Pinnacle Racing Group, and Lawless Alan, driving for Venturini Motorsports, would finish 2nd and 3rd, respectively.

Queen started on the pole and after losing the lead on the start, he regained it on lap 39 and eventually led a race-high 148 laps. He lost the lead after lap 185 and settled with a second-place finish. Scott took over the lead late in the event, leading 18 laps until he fell off on speed, finishing 7th.

== Report ==
=== Entry list ===
- (R) denotes rookie driver.

#	Driver	Team	Make	Sponsor
03	Alex Clubb	Clubb Racing Inc.	Ford	Race Parts Liquidators
3	Willie Mullins	Mullins Racing	Toyota	CW Metals / Crow Wing Recycling
5	Michael Clayton	City Garage Motorsports	Ford	ServiceMaster Restore / City Garage
06	Brayton Laster (R)	Wayne Peterson Racing	Ford	LG Trucking / Vet2Track
6	Lavar Scott	Rev Racing	Chevrolet	Max Siegel Inc.
7	Kadence Davenport	CCM Racing	Chevrolet	CCM Racing
9	Matt Kemp	Fast Track Racing	Ford	CIS Agency / ELHDetailing.com
10	Tony Musolino	Fast Track Racing	Toyota	AGNT Real Estate Media
11	Bryce Haugeberg	Fast Track Racing	Ford	North Dakota State University / Brenco
12	Trevor Ward	Fast Track Racing	Toyota	Fast Track Racing
18	Max Reaves	Joe Gibbs Racing	Toyota	Cook Out
20	Lawless Alan	Venturini Motorsports	Toyota	AutoParkIt.com
25	Ty Fredrickson	Venturini Motorsports	Toyota	Fredrickson Masonry / Nortec Equipment
28	Brenden Queen (R)	Pinnacle Racing Group	Chevrolet	BestRepair.net
31	Quinn Davis	Rise Motorsports	Toyota	BullSnot!
48	Brad Smith	Brad Smith Motorsports	Ford	Gary's Speed Shop
55	Isabella Robusto (R)	Venturini Motorsports	Toyota	Yahoo
67	Casey Budd	Maples Motorsports	Chevrolet	Maples Motorsports
70	Taylor Reimer	Nitro Motorsports	Toyota	BuzzBallz
85	Becca Monopoli	City Garage Motorsports	Ford	Orlando Health
86	Brian Clubb	Clubb Racing Inc.	Ford	Yavapai Bottle Gas
97	Jason Kitzmiller	CR7 Motorsports	Chevrolet	A.L.L. Construction / Carter Cat
98	Dale Shearer	Shearer Speed Racing	Toyota	Shearer Speed Racing
99	Michael Maples	Maples Motorsports	Chevrolet	Don Ray Petroleum / Maples Motorsports
Official entry list

== Practice ==
The first and only practice session was held on Saturday, June 21, at 3:40 PM CST, and would last for 50 minutes. Max Reaves, driving for Joe Gibbs Racing, would set the fastest time in the session, with a lap of 14.755, and a speed of 91.494 mph (147.245 km/h).

Pos.	#	Driver	Team	Make	Time	Speed
1	18	Max Reaves	Joe Gibbs Racing	Toyota	14.755	91.494
2	28	Brenden Queen (R)	Pinnacle Racing Group	Chevrolet	14.876	90.750
3	20	Lawless Alan	Venturini Motorsports	Toyota	14.919	90.489
Full practice results

== Qualifying ==
Qualifying was held on Saturday, June 21, at 5:20 PM CST. The qualifying procedure used is a single-car, two-lap system with one round. Drivers will be on track by themselves and will have two laps to post a qualifying time, and whoever sets the fastest time will win the pole.

Brenden Queen, driving for Pinnacle Racing Group, would score the pole for the race, with a lap of 14.716, and a speed of 91.737 mph (147.636 km/h).

=== Qualifying results ===
Pos.	#	Driver	Team	Make	Time	Speed
1	28	Brenden Queen (R)	Pinnacle Racing Group	Chevrolet	14.716	91.737
2	18	Max Reaves	Joe Gibbs Racing	Toyota	14.740	91.588
3	20	Lawless Alan	Venturini Motorsports	Toyota	14.779	91.346
4	25	Ty Fredrickson	Venturini Motorsports	Toyota	14.786	91.303
5	55	Isabella Robusto (R)	Venturini Motorsports	Toyota	14.802	91.204
6	97	Jason Kitzmiller	CR7 Motorsports	Chevrolet	14.824	91.069
7	6	Lavar Scott	Rev Racing	Chevrolet	14.835	91.001
8	70	Taylor Reimer	Nitro Motorsports	Toyota	14.921	90.477
9	3	Willie Mullins	Mullins Racing	Toyota	15.111	89.339
10	85	Becca Monopoli	City Garage Motorsports	Ford	15.254	88.501
11	11	Bryce Haugeberg	Fast Track Racing	Ford	15.400	87.662
12	10	Tony Musolino	Fast Track Racing	Toyota	15.534	86.906
13	03	Alex Clubb	Clubb Racing Inc.	Ford	15.589	86.600
14	06	Brayton Laster (R)	Wayne Peterson Racing	Ford	15.606	86.505
15	9	Matt Kemp	Fast Track Racing	Ford	15.764	85.638
16	12	Trevor Ward	Fast Track Racing	Toyota	15.879	85.018
17	99	Michael Maples	Maples Motorsports	Chevrolet	15.987	84.444
18	7	Kadence Davenport	CCM Racing	Chevrolet	15.996	84.396
19	67	Casey Budd	Maples Motorsports	Chevrolet	16.523	81.704
20	5	Michael Clayton	City Garage Motorsports	Ford	16.552	81.561
21	98	Dale Shearer	Shearer Speed Racing	Toyota	16.639	81.135
22	86	Brian Clubb	Clubb Racing Inc.	Ford	16.675	80.960
23	31	Quinn Davis	Rise Motorsports	Toyota	17.138	78.772
24	48	Brad Smith	Brad Smith Motorsports	Ford	18.220	74.094
Official qualifying results

== Race results ==
Fin	St	#	Driver	Team	Make	Laps	Led	Status	Pts
1	2	18	Max Reaves	Joe Gibbs Racing	Toyota	250	84	Running	47
2	1	28	Brenden Queen (R)	Pinnacle Racing Group	Chevrolet	250	148	Running	45
3	3	20	Lawless Alan	Venturini Motorsports	Toyota	250	0	Running	41
4	4	25	Ty Fredrickson	Venturini Motorsports	Toyota	250	0	Running	40
5	5	55	Isabella Robusto (R)	Venturini Motorsports	Toyota	250	0	Running	39
6	6	97	Jason Kitzmiller	CR7 Motorsports	Chevrolet	250	0	Running	38
7	7	6	Lavar Scott	Rev Racing	Chevrolet	249	18	Running	38
8	8	70	Taylor Reimer	Nitro Motorsports	Toyota	249	0	Running	36
9	9	3	Willie Mullins	Mullins Racing	Toyota	248	0	Running	35
10	13	03	Alex Clubb	Clubb Racing Inc.	Ford	239	0	Running	34
11	17	31	Quinn Davis	Rise Motorsports	Toyota	238	0	Running	33
12	12	10	Tony Musolino	Fast Track Racing	Toyota	237	0	Running	32
13	18	06	Brayton Laster (R)	Wayne Peterson Racing	Ford	235	0	Running	31
14	14	99	Michael Maples	Maples Motorsports	Chevrolet	225	0	Running	30
15	11	11	Bryce Haugeberg	Fast Track Racing	Ford	215	0	Running	29
16	10	85	Becca Monopoli	City Garage Motorsports	Ford	148	0	Fatigue	28
17	15	7	Kadence Davenport	CCM Racing	Chevrolet	119	0	Overheating	27
18	24	48	Brad Smith	Brad Smith Motorsports	Ford	81	0	Overheating	26
19	16	67	Casey Budd	Maples Motorsports	Chevrolet	39	0	Mechanical	25
20	23	86	Brian Clubb	Clubb Racing Inc.	Ford	39	0	Mechanical	24
21	19	9	Matt Kemp	Fast Track Racing	Ford	15	0	Mechanical	23
22	22	98	Dale Shearer	Shearer Speed Racing	Toyota	13	0	Too Slow	22
23	21	5	Michael Clayton	City Garage Motorsports	Ford	11	0	Mechanical	21
24	20	12	Trevor Ward	Fast Track Racing	Toyota	5	0	Mechanical	20
Official race results

== Standings after the race ==
Drivers' Championship standings

	Pos	Driver	Points
	1	Brenden Queen	372
	2	Lawless Alan	361 (–11)
	3	Lavar Scott	358 (–14)
	4	Jason Kitzmiller	307 (–65)
1	5	Isabella Robusto	272 (–100)
1	6	Andy Jankowiak	262 (–110)
1	7	Alex Clubb	259 (–113)
1	8	Michael Maples	248 (–124)
1	9	Brayton Laster	238 (–134)
3	10	Thad Moffitt	227 (–145)

- Note: Only the first 10 positions are included for the driver standings.

Previous race: 2025 Berlin ARCA 200	ARCA Menards Series; 2025 season	Next race: 2025 Lime Rock Park 100
