= Becca Monopoli =

American racing driver (born 1989)

- Born: June 28, 1989 (age 37); Lakeland, Florida, U.S.

ARCA Menards Series career
- 8 races run over 2 years
- Best finish: 34th (2025)
- First race: 2024 Circle City 200 (IRP)
- Last race: 2025 Owens Corning 200 (Toledo)
Wins	Top tens	Poles
0	1	0

ARCA Menards Series East career
- 4 races run over 2 years
- Best finish: 31st (2025)
- First race: 2024 Circle City 200 (IRP)
- Last race: 2025 LiUNA! 150 (IRP)
Wins	Top tens	Poles
0	1	0
- Statistics up to date as of October 4, 2025.

Rebecca Monopoli (born June 28, 1989) is an American professional stock car racing driver who last competed part-time in the ARCA Menards Series East, driving the No. 85 Ford for City Garage Motorsports. She is a regular in the PRO Truck Series, where she has garnered twenty championships and ninety four victories in the category.

== Racing career ==
Monopoli has previously competed in series such as the World Series of Asphalt Stock Car Racing Series, the Florida United Promoters Legends Series, the Florida Pro Truck Series as well as the Challenge Series division, and the Sunshine State Challenge Series Pro Trucks Series. She was a part of the Alan Kulwicki Driver Development Program in 2021.

In 2024, Monopoli participated in pre-season testing for the ARCA Menards Series at Daytona International Speedway driving for Fast Track Racing in the No. 66 Toyota. Weeks later, it was announced that Monopoli would attempt to make her ARCA debut at Daytona, driving the No. 47 Toyota for Mixon Racing in collaboration with Mike Harmon Racing. She ultimately failed to qualify after setting the 46th fastest time in qualifying.

On April 9, 2024, it was announced that Monopoli would attempt to make her ARCA debut at Lucas Oil Indianapolis Raceway Park, this time driving for the newly formed City Garage Motorsports in the No. 85 car.

In 2025, it was revealed that Monopoli would drive a partial schedule in ARCA with CGM, including Daytona and Talladega Superspeedway, where she would run in collaboration with Clubb Racing Inc.

On September 19, 2025, it was announced that Monopoli would run full-time in the ARCA Menards Series East in 2026, driving the No. 85 Ford for CGM. However, on February 23, 2026, it was revealed that she would not run full-time with the team.

== Personal life ==
Monopoli is part of the Florida Sheriff's Young Ranches, a non-profit organization that assists at-risk youth.

== Motorsports career results ==
=== ARCA Menards Series ===
(key) (Bold – Pole position awarded by qualifying time. Italics – Pole position earned by points standings or practice time. * – Most laps led. ** – All laps led.)

ARCA Menards Series results
Year	Team	No.	Make	1	2	3	4	5	6	7	8	9	10	11	12	13	14	15	16	17	18	19	20	AMSC	Pts	Ref
2024	Mixon Racing	47	Toyota	DAY; DNQ	PHO	TAL	DOV	KAN	CLT	IOW	MOH	BLN												67th	53	
2024	City Garage Motorsports	85	Ford										IRP; 27	SLM	ELK	MCH	ISF	MLW	DSF	GLN	BRI	KAN	TOL; 11	67th	53	
2025	City Garage Motorsports	86	Toyota	DAY; 26	PHO																			34th	130	
2025	City Garage Motorsports	86	Ford			TAL; 37	KAN	CLT	MCH															34th	130	
2025	City Garage Motorsports	85	Ford							BLN; 11	ELK; 16	LRP	DOV	IRP; 34	IOW	GLN	ISF	MAD	DSF	BRI	SLM	KAN	TOL; 10	34th	130	

==== ARCA Menards Series East ====
ARCA Menards Series East results
Year	Team	No.	Make	1	2	3	4	5	6	7	8	AMSEC	Pts	Ref
2024	City Garage Motorsports	85	Ford	FIF	DOV	NSV	FRS	IOW	IRP; 27	MLW	BRI	58th	17	
2025	City Garage Motorsports	85	Ford	FIF; 14	CAR	NSV; 8	FRS	DOV	IRP; 34	IOW	BRI	31st	76	
