= 2025 Dutch Boy 150 =

4th race of the 2025 ARCA Menards Series East

Race details
- Race 4 of 8 of the 2025 ARCA Menards Series East
- Date: May 17, 2025
- Official name: 3rd Annual Dutch Boy 150
- Location: Flat Rock Speedway in Ash Township, Michigan
- Course: Permanent racing facility
- Course length: 0.25 miles (0.40 km)
- Distance: 150 laps, 37 mi (60 km)
- Scheduled distance: 150 laps, 37 mi (60 km)
- Average speed: 71.040 mph (114.328 km/h)

Pole position
Driver	Max Reaves	Joe Gibbs Racing
- Time: 12.669

Most laps led
Driver	Max Reaves	Joe Gibbs Racing
- Laps: 144

Winner
No. 18	Max Reaves	Joe Gibbs Racing

Television in the United States
- Network: FloRacing
- Announcers: Charles Krall

Radio in the United States
- Radio: ARCA Racing Network

The 2025 Dutch Boy 150 was the 4th stock car race of the 2025 ARCA Menards Series East season, and the 3rd iteration of the event. The race was held on Saturday, May 17, 2025, at Flat Rock Speedway in Ash Township, Michigan, a 0.25 mile (0.40 km) permanent asphalt oval shaped short track. The race took the scheduled 150 laps to complete. Max Reaves, driving for Joe Gibbs Racing, would win the race, leading all but six laps and holding off Tyler Reif throughout the entire race to earn his third career ARCA Menards Series East win in his third start, becoming the second driver in series history to win in their first three career starts. To fill out the podium, Takuma Koga, driving for Fast Track Racing, scored his best career ARCA finish with 3rd.

== Report ==
=== Background ===
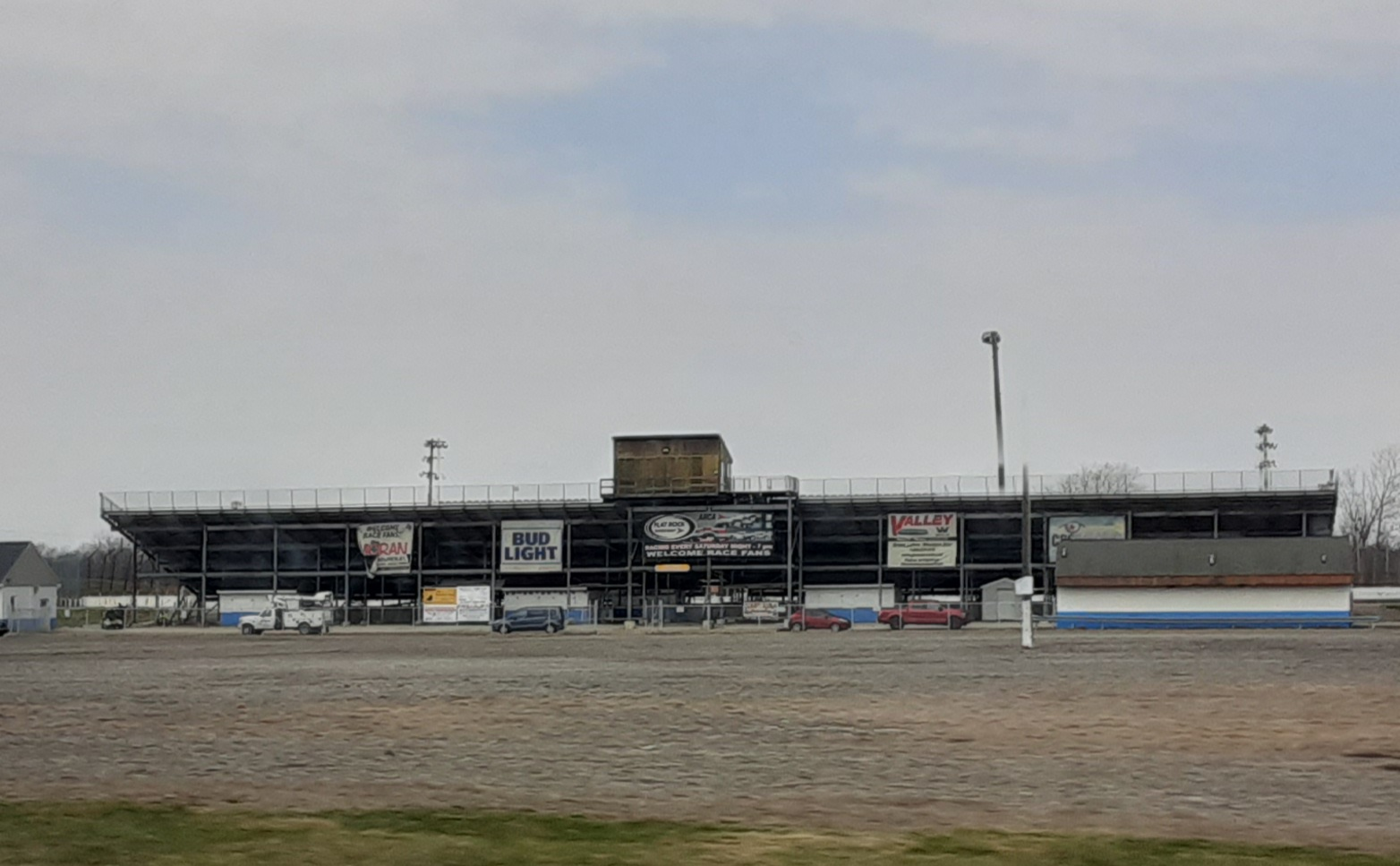
Flat Rock Speedway, the track where the race will be held.

Flat Rock Speedway is a race track in Monroe County in the U.S. state of Michigan. It is located in Ash Township just south of the city of Flat Rock along U.S. Route 24. Opened in 1953, it is owned by NASCAR and is the sister track to Toledo Speedway. It features racing on Saturday nights that include Outlaw Body Late Models, Street Stocks, and Figure 8s for its weekly divisions. It is the closest NASCAR-style oval track racing circuit to Detroit, Michigan.

==== Entry list ====
- (R) denotes rookie driver.

#	Driver	Team	Make	Sponsor
01	Jeff Smith	Brad Smith Motorsports	Ford	Gary's Speed Shop
06	Nate Moeller	Wayne Peterson Racing	Toyota	Peterson Motorsports
9	Trevor Ward	Fast Track Racing	Toyota	Fast Track Racing
10	Matt Kemp	Fast Track Racing	Ford	ELHDetailing.com
11	Zachary Tinkle	Fast Track Racing	Toyota	Racing for Rescues
12	Takuma Koga (R)	Fast Track Racing	Toyota	Macnica Yit Ikedo / CKB
18	Max Reaves	Joe Gibbs Racing	Toyota	Cook Out
23	Tyler Reif (R)	Sigma Performance Services	Chevrolet	SPS / Vegas Fastener Manufacturing
31	Rita Goulet	Rise Motorsports	Toyota	risemotorsports.com
34	Austin Vaughn (R)	VWV Racing	Ford	Safford Trading Company
48	Brad Smith	Brad Smith Motorsports	Ford	Gary's Speed Shop
65	Jeffery MacZink	MacZink Racing	Toyota	Parkway Services / Syncon
79	Isaac Kitzmiller (R)	ACR Motorsports	Chevrolet	A.L.L. Construction / Carter Cat
86	Alex Malycke	Clubb Racing Inc.	Ford	The Giza Power Plant
95	Jackson McLerran	MAN Motorsports	Toyota	JSJ Construction / ARYLCO LLC
Official entry list

== Practice ==
The first and only practice session was held on Saturday, May 17, at 3:30 PM EST, and would last for 60 minutes. Austin Vaughn, driving for VWV Racing, would set the fastest time in the session, with a lap of 12.763, and a speed of 70.516 mph (113.485 km/h).

Pos.	#	Driver	Team	Make	Time	Speed
1	34	Austin Vaughn (R)	VWV Racing	Ford	12.763	70.516
2	79	Isaac Kitzmiller (R)	ACR Motorsports	Chevrolet	12.800	70.312
3	18	Max Reaves	Joe Gibbs Racing	Toyota	12.817	70.219
Full practice results

== Qualifying ==
Qualifying was held on Saturday, May 17, at 5:10 PM EST. The qualifying system used is a single-car, two-lap based system. Drivers will be on track by themselves and will have two laps to post a qualifying time, and whoever sets the fastest time will win the pole.

Max Reaves, driving for Joe Gibbs Racing, would score the pole for the race, with a lap of 12.669, and a speed of 71.040 mph (114.328 km/h).

=== Qualifying results ===
Pos.	#	Driver	Team	Make	Time	Speed
1	18	Max Reaves	Joe Gibbs Racing	Toyota	12.669	71.040
2	10	Matt Kemp	Fast Track Racing	Ford	12.757	70.550
3	23	Tyler Reif (R)	Sigma Performance Services	Chevrolet	12.927	69.622
4	79	Isaac Kitzmiller (R)	ACR Motorsports	Chevrolet	13.016	69.146
5	12	Takuma Koga (R)	Fast Track Racing	Toyota	13.104	68.681
6	65	Jeffery MacZink	MacZink Racing	Toyota	13.153	68.425
7	9	Trevor Ward	Fast Track Racing	Toyota	13.175	68.311
8	11	Zachary Tinkle	Fast Track Racing	Toyota	13.251	67.919
9	34	Austin Vaughn (R)	VWV Racing	Ford	13.601	66.172
10	86	Alex Malycke	Clubb Racing Inc.	Ford	13.687	65.756
11	31	Rita Goulet	Rise Motorsports	Toyota	13.689	65.746
12	06	Nate Moeller	Wayne Peterson Racing	Toyota	13.840	65.029
13	48	Brad Smith	Brad Smith Motorsports	Ford	13.854	64.963
14	01	Jeff Smith	Brad Smith Motorsports	Ford	15.727	57.226
15	95	Jackson McLerran	MAN Motorsports	Toyota	15.801	56.958
Official qualifying results

== Race results ==
Fin	St	#	Driver	Team	Make	Laps	Led	Status	Pts
1	1	18	Max Reaves	Joe Gibbs Racing	Toyota	150	144	Running	49
2	3	23	Tyler Reif (R)	Sigma Performance Services	Chevrolet	150	6	Running	43
3	5	12	Takuma Koga (R)	Fast Track Racing	Toyota	150	0	Running	41
4	2	10	Matt Kemp	Fast Track Racing	Ford	150	0	Running	40
5	9	34	Austin Vaughn (R)	VWV Racing	Ford	149	0	Running	39
6	8	11	Zachary Tinkle	Fast Track Racing	Toyota	146	0	Running	38
7	4	79	Isaac Kitzmiller (R)	ACR Motorsports	Chevrolet	146	0	Running	37
8	13	48	Brad Smith	Brad Smith Motorsports	Ford	143	0	Running	36
9	15	95	Jackson McLerran	MAN Motorsports	Toyota	141	0	Running	35
10	10	86	Alex Malycke	Clubb Racing Inc.	Ford	134	0	Running	34
11	12	06	Nate Moeller	Wayne Peterson Racing	Toyota	127	0	Running	33
12	11	31	Rita Goulet	Rise Motorsports	Toyota	121	0	Mechanical	32
13	6	65	Jeffery MacZink	MacZink Racing	Toyota	79	0	Overheating	31
14	7	9	Trevor Ward	Fast Track Racing	Toyota	15	0	Quit	30
15	14	01	Jeff Smith	Brad Smith Motorsports	Ford	0	0	Quit	29
Official race results

== Standings after the race ==
Drivers' Championship standings

	Pos	Driver	Points
	1	Isaac Kitzmiller	154
1	2	Tyler Reif	148 (-6)
2	3	Max Reaves	146 (–8)
2	4	Zachary Tinkle	144 (–10)
1	5	Takuma Koga	140 (–14)
	6	Austin Vaughn	129 (–25)
	7	Nate Moeller	116 (–38)
	8	Brad Smith	112 (–42)
7	9	Rita Goulet	84 (–70)
1	10	Hunter Wright	76 (–78)

- Note: Only the first 10 positions are included for the driver standings.

Previous race: 2025 Music City 150	ARCA Menards Series East; 2025 season	Next race: 2025 General Tire 150 (Dover)
