= 2025 Music City 150 =

3rd race of the 2025 ARCA Menards Series East

Race details
- Race 3 of 8 of the 2025 ARCA Menards Series East
- Date: May 4, 2025
- Official name: 5th Annual Music City 150
- Location: Nashville Fairgrounds Speedway in Nashville, Tennessee
- Course: Permanent racing facility
- Course length: 0.596 miles (0.959 km)
- Distance: 150 laps, 89 mi (143 km)
- Scheduled distance: 150 laps, 89 mi (143 km)
- Average speed: 80.520 mph (129.584 km/h)

Pole position
Driver	Max Reaves	Joe Gibbs Racing
- Grid positions set by competition-based formula

Most laps led
Driver	Max Reaves	Joe Gibbs Racing
- Laps: 147

Winner
No. 18	Max Reaves	Joe Gibbs Racing

Television in the United States
- Network: FloRacing
- Announcers: Charles Krall

Radio in the United States
- Radio: ARCA Racing Network

The 2025 Music City 150 was the 3rd stock car race of the 2025 ARCA Menards Series East season, and the 5th iteration of the event. The race was originally scheduled to be held on Saturday, May 3, 2025, but was postponed to Sunday, May 4, due to inclement weather. The race was held at the Nashville Fairgrounds Speedway in Nashville, Tennessee, a 0.596 mile (0.959 km) permanent asphalt oval shaped short track. The race took the scheduled 150 laps to complete. Max Reaves, driving for Joe Gibbs Racing, would be unstoppable throughout the event, leading all but three laps to earn his second career ARCA Menards Series East win in his second start, becoming the third driver in series history to win in their first two career starts. To fill out the podium, Tyler Reif, driving for Sigma Performance Services, and Hunter Wright, driving for MAN Motorsports, would finish 2nd and 3rd, respectively.

== Report ==
=== Background ===
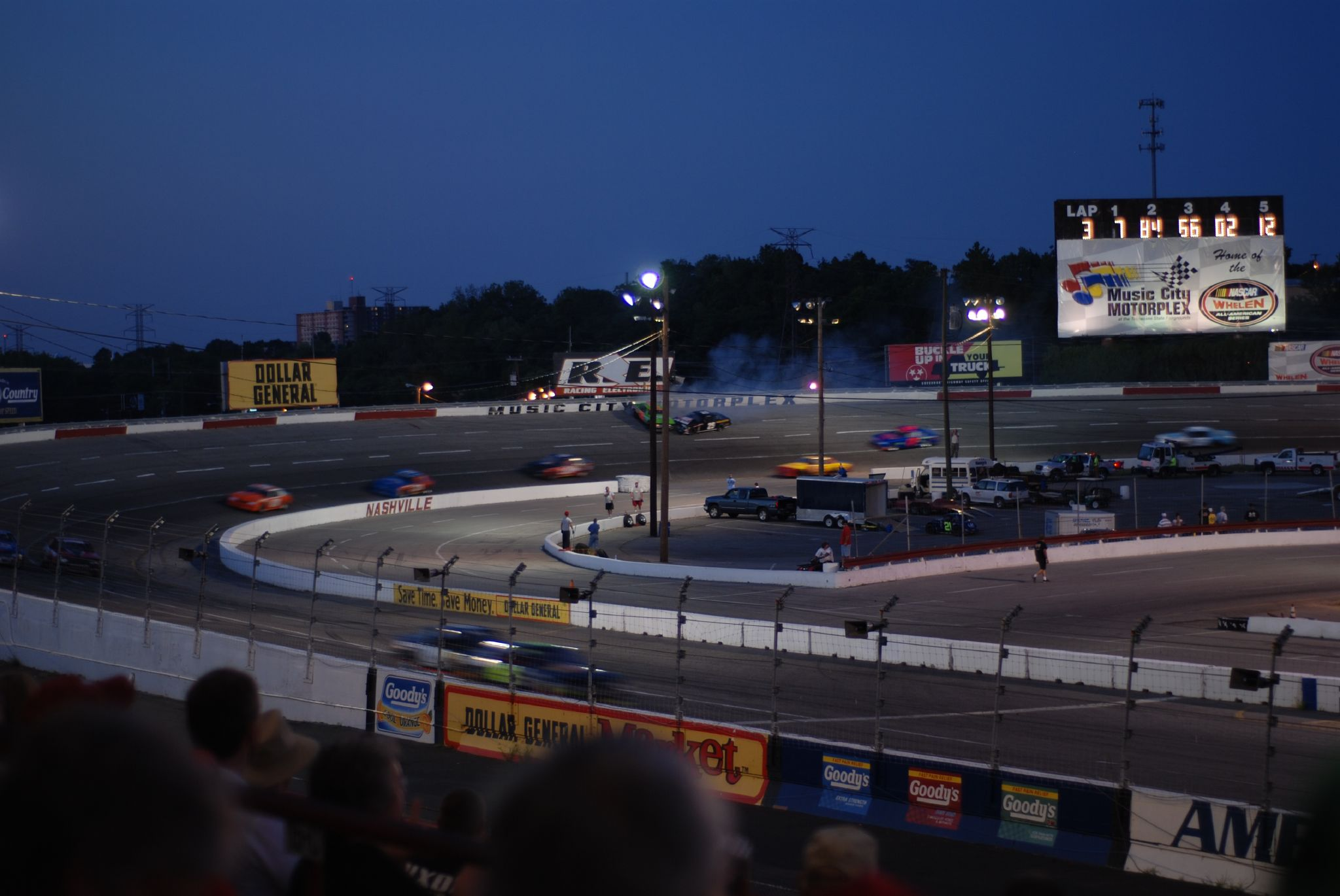
Nashville Fairgrounds Speedway, the track where the race was held.

Nashville Fairgrounds Speedway is a motorsport racetrack located at the Nashville Fairgrounds near downtown Nashville, Tennessee. The track is the second-oldest continually operating track in the United States. The track held NASCAR Grand National/Winston Cup (now NASCAR Cup Series) races from 1958 to 1984.

The speedway is currently an 18 degree banked paved oval. The track is 0.596 mi (0.959 km) long. Inside the larger oval is a 1/4 mi (0.40 km) paved oval.

The track was converted to a 1/2 mi (0.80 km) paved oval in 1957, when it began to be a NASCAR series track. The speedway was lengthened between the 1969 and 1970 seasons. The corners were cut down from 35 degrees to their present 18 degrees in 1972. The track was repaved between the 1995 and 1996 seasons.

==== Entry list ====
- (R) denotes rookie driver.

#	Driver	Team	Make	Sponsor
01	Rita Goulet	Wayne Peterson Racing	Chevrolet	Peterson Motorsports
06	Nate Moeller	Wayne Peterson Racing	Toyota	Peterson Motorsports
9	Mike Basham	Fast Track Racing	Ford	Double "H" Ranch
10	D. L. Wilson	Fast Track Racing	Toyota	Performance Cleaners
11	Zachary Tinkle	Fast Track Racing	Toyota	Scouting America
12	Takuma Koga (R)	Fast Track Racing	Toyota	Macnica Yit Ikedo / CKB
18	Max Reaves	Joe Gibbs Racing	Toyota	Cook Out
23	Tyler Reif (R)	Sigma Performance Services	Chevrolet	Sigma Performance Services
31	Quinn Davis	Rise Motorsports	Toyota	Hepaws Garage
34	Austin Vaughn (R)	VWV Racing	Ford	Safford Trading Company
48	Brad Smith	Brad Smith Motorsports	Ford	Gary's Speed Shop
79	Isaac Kitzmiller (R)	ACR Motorsports	Chevrolet	A.L.L. Construction / Carter Cat
85	Becca Monopoli	City Garage Motorsports	Ford	Orlando Health
86	Jeff Maconi	Clubb Racing Inc.	Ford	Maconi Setup Shop
95	Hunter Wright	MAN Motorsports	Toyota	Visit Wilco / Cedar City RV
96	Jackson McLerran	MAN Motorsports	Toyota	Firemark Property Mgt / ARYLCO LLC
Official entry list

== Practice ==
The first and only practice session was originally scheduled to be held on Saturday, May 3, at 2:00 PM CST, but was postponed due to constant rain showers. The session was moved to Sunday, May 4, at 1:00 PM CST, and would last for 30 minutes. Max Reaves, driving for Joe Gibbs Racing, would set the fastest time in the session, with a lap of 19.853, and a speed of 108.074 mph (173.928 km/h).

Pos.	#	Driver	Team	Make	Time	Speed
1	18	Max Reaves	Joe Gibbs Racing	Toyota	19.853	108.074
2	95	Hunter Wright	MAN Motorsports	Toyota	19.962	107.484
3	23	Tyler Reif (R)	Sigma Performance Services	Chevrolet	20.109	106.698
Full practice results

== Starting lineup ==
Qualifying was originally scheduled to be held on Saturday, May 3, at 4:15 PM CST, but was cancelled due to constant rain showers. The starting lineup would be determined by last season's owners points. As a result, Max Reaves, driving for Joe Gibbs Racing, will start on the pole.

=== Starting lineup ===
Pos.	#	Driver	Team	Make
1	18	Max Reaves	Joe Gibbs Racing	Toyota
2	11	Zachary Tinkle	Fast Track Racing	Toyota
3	10	D. L. Wilson	Fast Track Racing	Toyota
4	9	Mike Basham	Fast Track Racing	Ford
5	06	Nate Moeller	Wayne Peterson Racing	Toyota
6	12	Takuma Koga (R)	Fast Track Racing	Toyota
7	31	Quinn Davis	Rise Motorsports	Toyota
8	95	Hunter Wright	MAN Motorsports	Toyota
9	48	Brad Smith	Brad Smith Motorsports	Ford
10	23	Tyler Reif (R)	Sigma Performance Services	Chevrolet
11	01	Rita Goulet	Wayne Peterson Racing	Chevrolet
12	96	Jackson McLerran	MAN Motorsports	Toyota
13	86	Jeff Maconi	Clubb Racing Inc.	Ford
14	85	Becca Monopoli	City Garage Motorsports	Ford
15	79	Isaac Kitzmiller (R)	ACR Motorsports	Chevrolet
16	34	Austin Vaughn (R)	VWV Racing	Ford
Official starting lineup

== Race results ==
Fin	St	#	Driver	Team	Make	Laps	Led	Status	Pts
1	1	18	Max Reaves	Joe Gibbs Racing	Toyota	150	147	Running	49
2	10	23	Tyler Reif (R)	Sigma Performance Services	Chevrolet	150	3	Running	43
3	8	95	Hunter Wright	MAN Motorsports	Toyota	150	0	Running	41
4	15	79	Isaac Kitzmiller (R)	ACR Motorsports	Chevrolet	150	0	Running	40
5	2	11	Zachary Tinkle	Fast Track Racing	Toyota	150	0	Running	39
6	12	96	Jackson McLerran	MAN Motorsports	Toyota	149	0	Running	38
7	6	12	Takuma Koga (R)	Fast Track Racing	Toyota	146	0	Running	37
8	14	85	Becca Monopoli	City Garage Motorsports	Ford	146	0	Running	36
9	7	31	Quinn Davis	Rise Motorsports	Toyota	145	0	Running	35
10	5	06	Nate Moeller	Wayne Peterson Racing	Toyota	136	0	Running	34
11	9	48	Brad Smith	Brad Smith Motorsports	Ford	134	0	Running	33
12	13	86	Jeff Maconi	Clubb Racing Inc.	Ford	132	0	Running	32
13	3	10	D. L. Wilson	Fast Track Racing	Toyota	99	0	Rear End	31
14	16	34	Austin Vaughn (R)	VWV Racing	Ford	51	0	Rear End	30
15	4	9	Mike Basham	Fast Track Racing	Ford	9	0	Mechanical	29
16	11	01	Rita Goulet	Wayne Peterson Racing	Chevrolet	2	0	Quit	28
Official race results

== Standings after the race ==
Drivers' Championship standings

	Pos	Driver	Points
	1	Isaac Kitzmiller	117
1	2	Tyler Reif	110 (-7)
1	3	Zachary Tinkle	106 (–11)
1	4	Takuma Koga	99 (–18)
4	5	Max Reaves	97 (–20)
1	6	Austin Vaughn	90 (–27)
4	7	Nate Moeller	83 (–34)
6	8	Brad Smith	76 (–41)
13	9	Hunter Wright	76 (–41)
8	10	Kole Raz	74 (–43)

- Note: Only the first 10 positions are included for the driver standings.

Previous race: 2025 Rockingham ARCA 125	ARCA Menards Series East; 2025 season	Next race: 2025 Dutch Boy 150
