= Austin Vaughn =

American racing driver (born 2008)

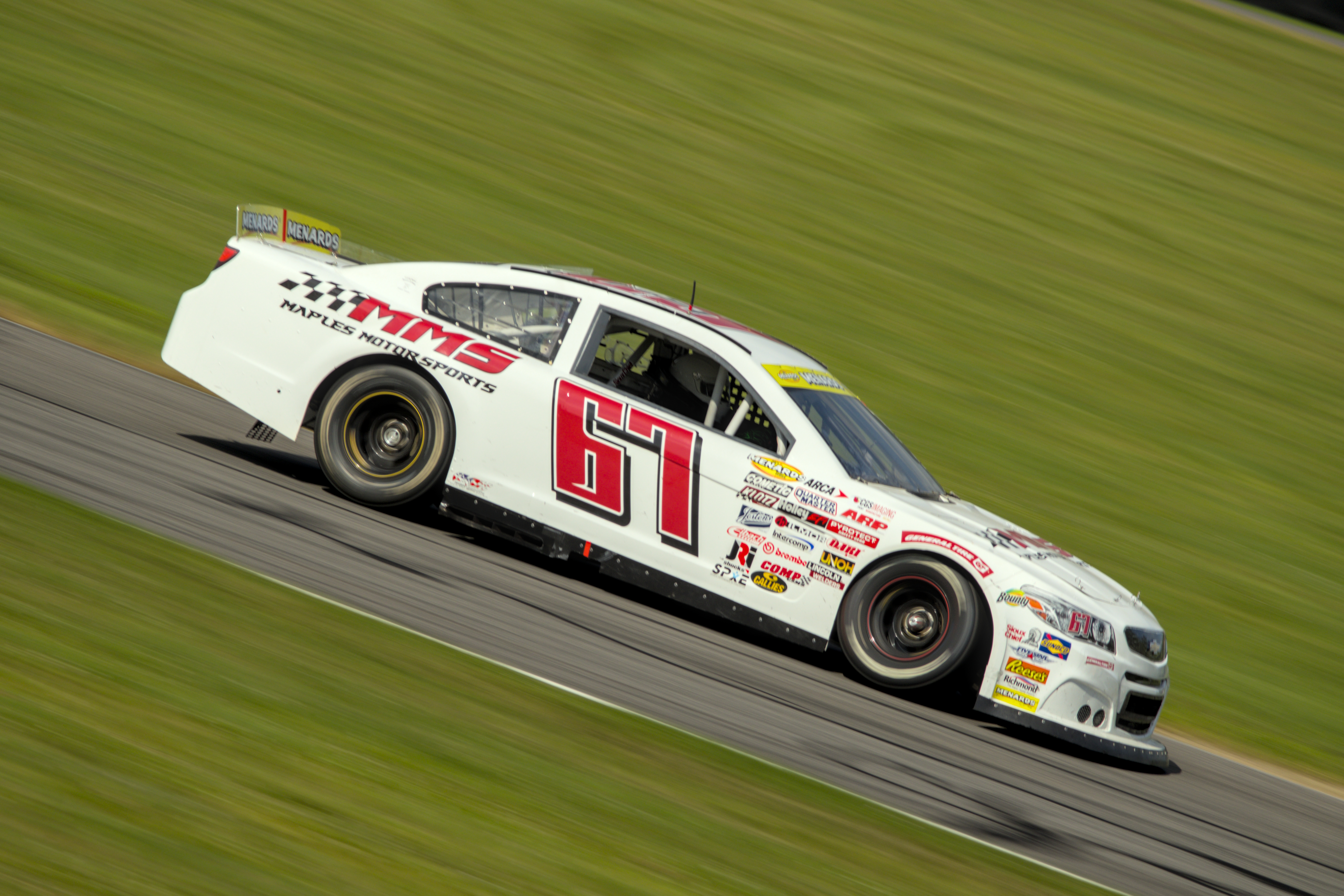
- Vaughn's No. 67 car at Lime Rock Park in 2025
- Born: August 15, 2008 (age 18); Burnsville, Mississippi, U.S.
- Awards: 2025 ARCA Menards Series East Rookie of the Year

ARCA Menards Series career
- 16 races run over 3 years
- Best finish: 20th (2026)
- First race: 2024 Southern Illinois 100 (DuQuoin)
- Last race: 2026 Menards 150 (Kansas)
Wins	Top tens	Poles
0	2	0

ARCA Menards Series East career
- 16 races run over 2 years
- Best finish: 4th (2025)
- First race: 2025 Pensacola 150 (Pensacola)
- Last race: 2026 Bush's Best 200 (Bristol)
Wins	Top tens	Poles
0	3	0
- Statistics up to date as of September 26, 2026.

Austin Vaughn (born August 15, 2008) is an American professional stock car racing driver. He last competed full-time in the ARCA Menards Series East, and part-time in the ARCA Menards Series, driving the No. 19/91 Ford for Maples Motorsports in collaboration with WAV Racing.

== Racing career ==
Vaughn has previously competed in series such as the Grand National Super Series, the Tri-State Open Wheel Modified Series, and the Crate Racin' USA Weekly Racing Series.

In 2024, it was revealed that Vaughn would make his ARCA Menards Series debut at the DuQuoin State Fairgrounds dirt track, driving the No. 06 Toyota. After placing eighteenth in the lone practice session, he qualified in eighteenth and finished in sixteenth due to mechanical issues after suffering a spin during the race.

In 2025, it was revealed that Vaughn would participate in the pre-season test for the ARCA Menards Series at Daytona International Speedway, driving the No. 00 Toyota for Kennedy Aiken Racing. A couple months later, it was revealed that Vaughn would make his ARCA Menards Series East debut at Five Flags Speedway, driving the No. 34 Ford for VWV Racing. He would later run the next three races at Rockingham, Nashville Fairgrounds, and at Flat Rock, getting a best finish of fifth at the latter event after setting the fastest time in the lone practice session earlier that day. He then made his return to the main ARCA series, driving the No. 67 Chevrolet for Maples Motorsports at Lime Rock Park, where he finished in eighteenth. He would continue to split time between VWV and Maples for the remainder of the year, including the remaining races in the East Series schedule. He finished fourth in the East Series standings and won Rookie of the Year honors.

In 2026, it was revealed that Vaughn would once again participate in the pre-season test for the ARCA Menards Series at Daytona International Speedway, this time driving the No. 34 Toyota for VWV Racing, although he never set a time. A month later, it was announced that Vaughn will once again run the full East Series schedule, this time driving the No. 19 Ford for Maples Motorsports.

== Motorsports career results ==
=== Stock car career summary ===
Season	Series	Team	Races	Wins	Top 5	Top 10	Points	Position
2024	ARCA Menards Series	Wayne Peterson Racing	1	0	0	0	28	90th
2025	ARCA Menards Series East	VWV Racing	7	0	1	1	320	4th
2025	ARCA Menards Series East	Maples Motorsports	1	0	0	0	320	4th
2025	ARCA Menards Series	Maples Motorsports	3	0	0	0	142	30th
2025	ARCA Menards Series	VWV Racing	3	0	0	0	142	30th
2026	ARCA Menards Series West	Maples Motorsports	0	0	0	0	0	N/A
2026	ARCA Menards Series East	Maples Motorsports	8	0	0	2	332	7th
2026	ARCA Menards Series	Maples Motorsports	9	0	0	2	245	20th

=== ARCA Menards Series ===
(key) (Bold – Pole position awarded by qualifying time. Italics – Pole position earned by points standings or practice time. * – Most laps led.)

ARCA Menards Series results
Year	Team	No.	Make	1	2	3	4	5	6	7	8	9	10	11	12	13	14	15	16	17	18	19	20	AMSC	Pts	Ref
2024	Wayne Peterson Racing	06	Toyota	DAY	PHO	TAL	DOV	KAN	CLT	IOW	MOH	BLN	IRP	SLM	ELK	MCH	ISF	MLW	DSF; 16	GLN	BRI	KAN	TOL	90th	28	
2025	Maples Motorsports	67	Chevy	DAY	PHO	TAL	KAN	CLT	MCH	BLN	ELK	LRP; 18			IOW; 18	GLN	ISF; 19	MAD	DSF					30th	142	
2025	VWV Racing	34	Ford										DOV; 14	IRP; 30										30th	142	
2025	VWV Racing	67	Ford																	BRI; 23	SLM	KAN	TOL	30th	142	
2026	Maples Motorsports	19	Chevy	DAY	PHO; Wth	KAN	TAL	GLN																20th	245	
2026	Maples Motorsports	19	Ford						TOL; 24	MCH	POC					IRP; 14	IOW; 19	ISF						20th	245	
2026	Maples Motorsports	91	Ford									BER; 20	ELK; 10	CHI	LRP				MAD; 12	DSF	SLM; 9	BRI; 18	KAN; 25	20th	245	

==== ARCA Menards Series East ====
ARCA Menards Series East results
Year	Team	No.	Make	1	2	3	4	5	6	7	8	AMSEC	Pts	Ref
2025	VWV Racing	34	Ford	FIF; 15	CAR; 13	NSV; 14	FRS; 5	DOV; 14	IRP; 30			4th	320	
2025	Maples Motorsports	67	Chevy							IOW; 18		4th	320	
2025	VWV Racing	67	Ford								BRI; 23	4th	320	
2026	Maples Motorsports	19	Ford	HCY; 10	CAR; 14	NSV; 14	TOL; 24	IRP; 14	FRS; 7	IOW; 19		7th	332	
2026	Maples Motorsports	91	Ford								BRI; 18	7th	332	

==== ARCA Menards Series West ====
ARCA Menards Series West results
Year	Team	No.	Make	1	2	3	4	5	6	7	8	9	10	11	12	13	AMSWC	Pts	Ref
2026	Maples Motorsports	19	Chevy	KER	PHO; Wth	TUC	SHA	CNS	TRI	SON	PIR	AAS	MAD	LVS	PHO	KER	N/A	0	
