= Nate Moeller =

American racing driver and crew chief (born 1997)

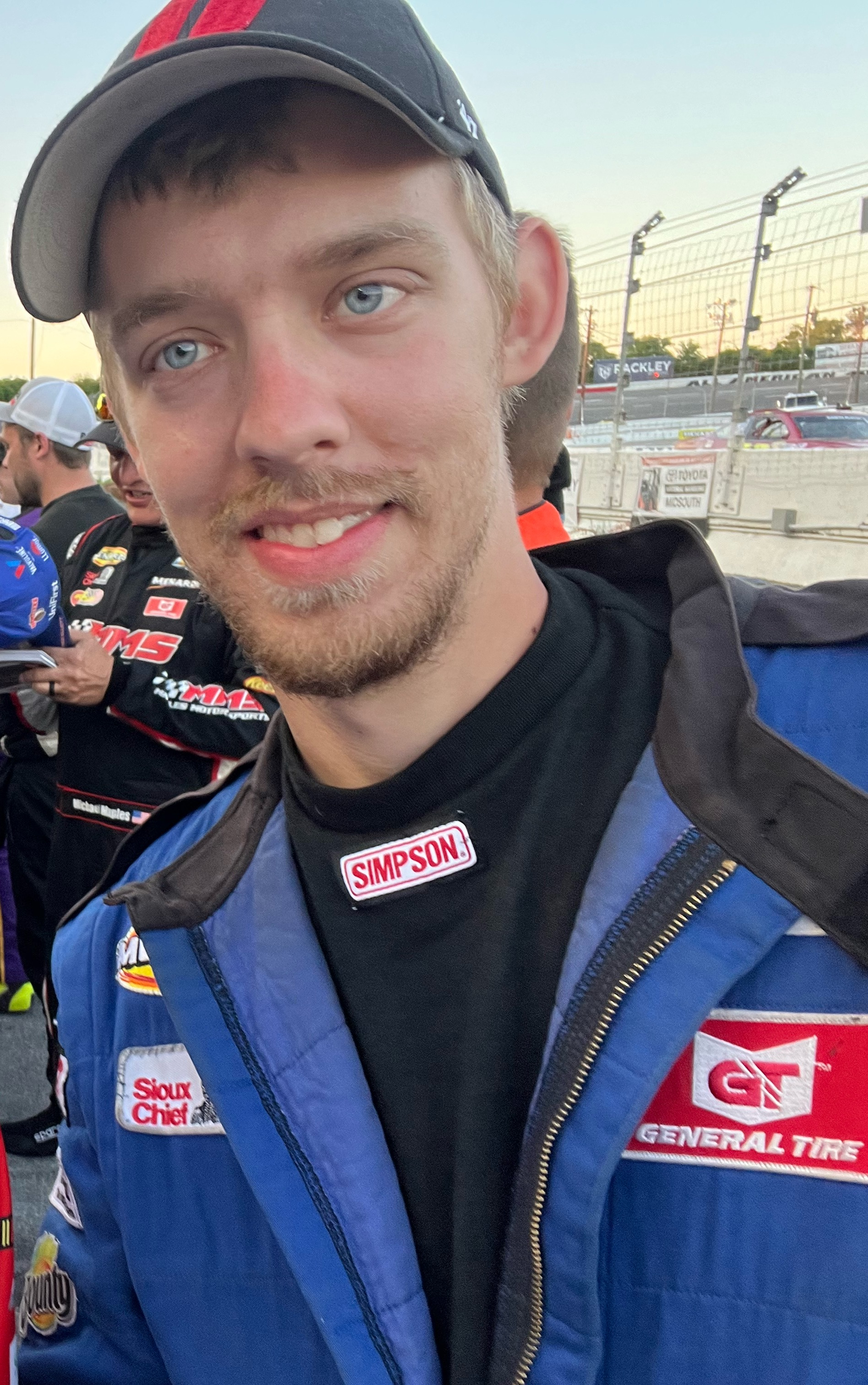
- Moeller at the Nashville Fairgrounds Speedway ARCA race in 2024
- Born: Nathan Moeller; November 18, 1997 (age 28); Lafayette, Ohio, U.S.

ARCA Menards Series career
- 37 races run over 5 years
- Best finish: 19th (2024, 2026)
- First race: 2022 Sprecher 150 (Milwaukee)
- Last race: 2026 Menards 150 (Kansas)
| Wins | Top tens | Poles |
|---|---|---|
| 0 | 0 | 0 |

ARCA Menards Series East career
- 24 races run over 5 years
- Best finish: 9th (2026)
- First race: 2022 Pensacola 200 (Pensacola)
- Last race: 2026 Bush's Best 200 (Bristol)
| Wins | Top tens | Poles |
|---|---|---|
| 0 | 1 | 0 |

ARCA Menards Series West career
- 1 race run over 1 year
- Best finish: 87th (2026)
- First race: 2026 General Tire 150 (Phoenix)
| Wins | Top tens | Poles |
|---|---|---|
| 0 | 0 | 0 |
- Statistics up to date as of November 2, 2026.

Nathan Moeller (born November 18, 1997) is an American professional stock car racing driver and crew chief. He last worked for Wayne Peterson Racing as the crew chief of their No. 06 car in the ARCA Menards Series. As a driver, he last competed part-time in the ARCA Menards Series, driving the No. 9 Ford for Fast Track Racing, and the No. 1 Chevrolet for Maples Motorsports, the No. 0/06 Chevrolet/Toyota for WPR, the No. 83 Ford for Clubb Racing Inc., and the No. 68 Ford for Kimmel Racing, and full-time in the ARCA Menards Series East, driving the No. 0/06 Toyota for WPR.

== Racing career ==
=== ARCA Menards Series East ===
Moeller made his ARCA Menards Series East debut in 2022 at Five Flags Speedway. He originally qualified for the race in the No. 06 Ford Fusion for Wayne Peterson Racing, but after Benny Chastain wrecked in his No. 10 Toyota Camry for Fast Track Racing, Moeller started the race in the No. 10 in his place. In 2023, Moeller would run four races for the Peterson team. Moeller ran six of the season's eight races in 2024, scoring a best finish of sixteenth at both Five Flags and Flat Rock.

=== ARCA Menards Series ===
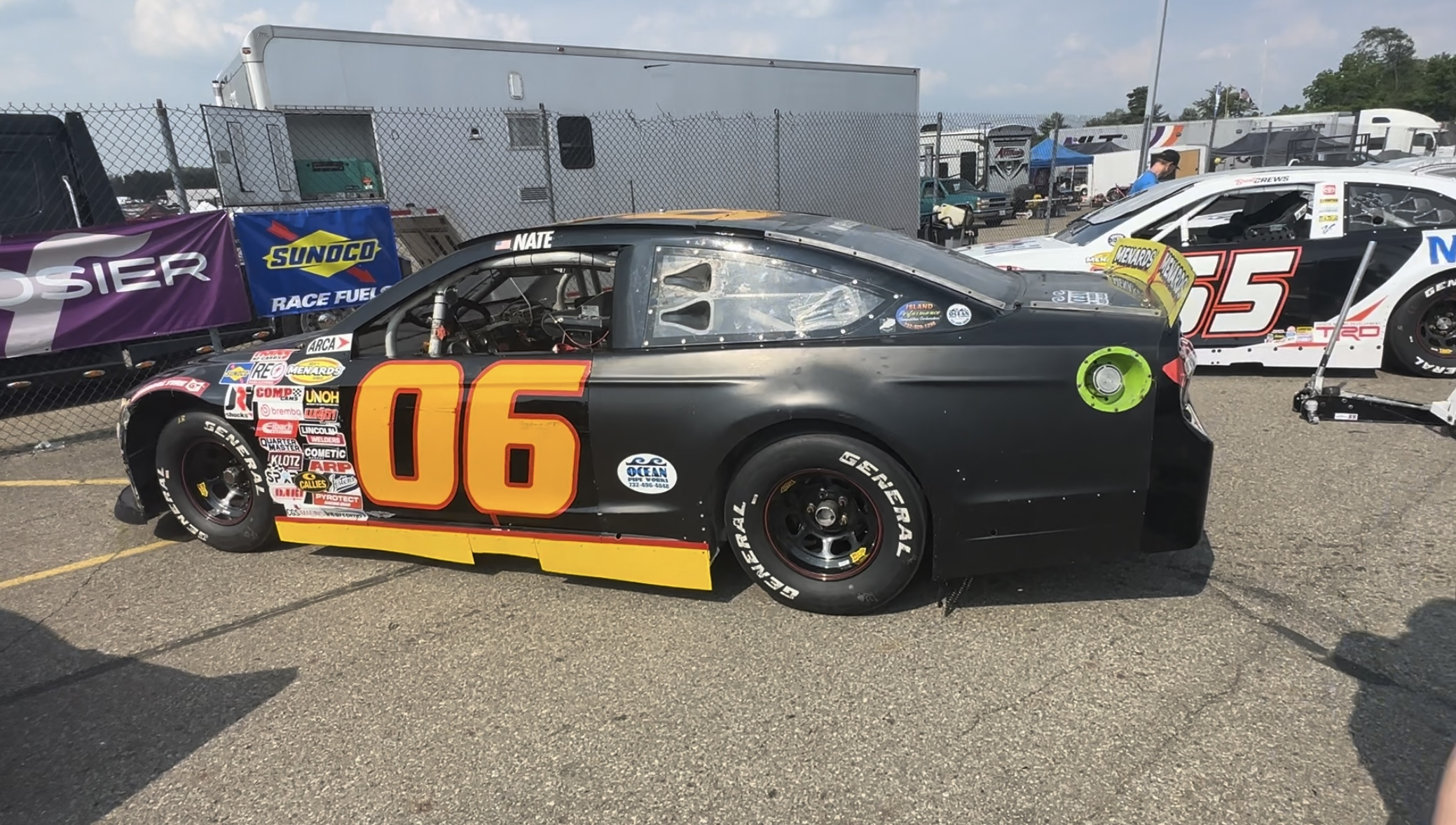
Moeller’s No. 06 ARCA car at Mid-Ohio in 2024

In 2022, Moeller made his ARCA Menards Series debut at the Milwaukee Mile, driving the No. 0 Toyota for Wayne Peterson Racing, where he would finish 27th. He would run three more races with the team, getting a best finish of fifteenth at the DuQuoin State Fairgrounds dirt track. In 2023, Moeller would run two races for the team, retiring early at IRP to act as crew chief for the team's other entry and with handling issues at Salem. Moeller would again race at Toledo in the season finale, where he would be running at the finish for the first time in his career; he finished the race thirteenth.

Moeller expanded his driving schedule in 2024, running eleven races and scoring a best finish of fourteenth, coming at both Berlin and Toledo.

On October 30, 2024, it was announced that Moeller would return to WPR in 2025 as the crew chief of the No. 06 car with Brayton Laster driving the car full-time. However, in 2025, he did return to driving the wheel of the No. 06 for WPR, during the first four races for the ARCA East season. At the race at Nashville Fairgrounds Speedway, he obtained his first top-ten finish.

== Motorsports career results ==
=== Stock car career summary ===
| Season | Series | Team | Races | Wins | Top 5 | Top 10 | Points | Position |
|---|---|---|---|---|---|---|---|---|
| 2022 | ARCA Menards Series East | Wayne Peterson Racing | 1 | 0 | 0 | 0 | 75 | 24th |
| 2022 | ARCA Menards Series East | Fast Track Racing | 1 | 0 | 0 | 0 | 75 | 24th |
| 2022 | ARCA Menards Series | Wayne Peterson Racing | 4 | 0 | 0 | 0 | 92 | 40th |
| 2023 | ARCA Menards Series East | Wayne Peterson Racing | 4 | 0 | 0 | 0 | 111 | 19th |
| 2023 | ARCA Menards Series | Wayne Peterson Racing | 3 | 0 | 0 | 0 | 77 | 48th |
| 2024 | ARCA Menards Series East | Wayne Peterson Racing | 6 | 0 | 0 | 0 | 186 | 15th |
| 2024 | ARCA Menards Series | Wayne Peterson Racing | 11 | 0 | 0 | 0 | 252 | 19th |
| 2025 | ARCA Menards Series East | Wayne Peterson Racing | 4 | 0 | 0 | 1 | 116 | 19th |
| 2025 | ARCA Menards Series | Fast Track Racing | 3 | 0 | 0 | 0 | 96 | 47th |
| 2025 | ARCA Menards Series | Wayne Peterson Racing | 2 | 0 | 0 | 0 | 96 | 47th |
| 2026 | ARCA Menards Series West | Fast Track Racing | 1 | 0 | 0 | 0 | 8 | 87th |
| 2026 | ARCA Menards Series East | Wayne Peterson Racing | 8 | 0 | 0 | 0 | 290 | 9th |
| 2026 | ARCA Menards Series | Fast Track Racing | 1 | 0 | 0 | 0 | 265 | 19th |
| 2026 | ARCA Menards Series | Maples Motorsports | 1 | 0 | 0 | 0 | 265 | 19th |
| 2026 | ARCA Menards Series | Wayne Peterson Racing | 9 | 0 | 0 | 0 | 265 | 19th |
| 2026 | ARCA Menards Series | Clubb Racing Inc. | 1 | 0 | 0 | 0 | 265 | 19th |
| 2026 | ARCA Menards Series | Kimmel Racing | 1 | 0 | 0 | 0 | 265 | 19th |

=== ARCA Menards Series ===
(key) (Bold – Pole position awarded by qualifying time. Italics – Pole position earned by points standings or practice time. * – Most laps led.)

ARCA Menards Series results
| Year | Team | No. | Make | 1 | 2 | 3 | 4 | 5 | 6 | 7 | 8 | 9 | 10 | 11 | 12 | 13 | 14 | 15 | 16 | 17 | 18 | 19 | 20 | AMSC | Pts | Ref |
|---|---|---|---|---|---|---|---|---|---|---|---|---|---|---|---|---|---|---|---|---|---|---|---|---|---|---|
| 2022 | Wayne Peterson Racing | 0 | Toyota | DAY | PHO | TAL | KAN | CLT | IOW | BLN | ELK | MOH | POC | IRP | MCH | GLN | ISF | MLW; 27 | | | | | TOL; 23 | 40th | 92 | |
| 2022 | Wayne Peterson Racing | 06 | Toyota | | | | | | | | | | | | | | | | DSF; 15 | KAN | BRI | SLM; 19 | | 40th | 92 | |
| 2023 | Wayne Peterson Racing | 0 | Toyota | DAY | PHO | TAL | KAN | CLT | BLN | ELK | MOH | IOW | POC | MCH | IRP; 23 | GLN | ISF | MLW | DSF | KAN | BRI | SLM; 19 | | 48th | 77 | |
| 2023 | Wayne Peterson Racing | 06 | Toyota | | | | | | | | | | | | | | | | | | | | TOL; 13 | 48th | 77 | |
| 2024 | Wayne Peterson Racing | 06 | Ford | DAY | PHO | TAL | DOV | KAN | CLT | IOW | MOH; 21 | | | | | MCH; 24 | | MLW; 21 | | | BRI; 30 | KAN | | 19th | 252 | |
| 2024 | Wayne Peterson Racing | 06 | Toyota | | | | | | | | | BLN; 14 | | | ELK; 19 | | ISF; 18 | | | GLN; 23 | | | TOL; 14 | 19th | 252 | |
| 2024 | Wayne Peterson Racing | 0 | Toyota | | | | | | | | | | IRP; 28 | SLM | | | | | | | | | | 19th | 252 | |
| 2024 | Wayne Peterson Racing | 0 | Ford | | | | | | | | | | | | | | | | DSF; 20 | | BRI; Wth | | | 19th | 252 | |
| 2025 | Fast Track Racing | 10 | Toyota | DAY | PHO | TAL | KAN; 24 | | | | | | | | | | | | | | | | | 47th | 96 | |
| 2025 | Fast Track Racing | 9 | Toyota | | | | | CLT; 31 | | | | | | | | | | | | | | | | 47th | 96 | |
| 2025 | Wayne Peterson Racing | 0 | Toyota | | | | | | MCH; 27 | BLN | ELK | | | | | | | | | | | | TOL; 19 | 47th | 96 | |
| 2025 | Fast Track Racing | 9 | Ford | | | | | | | | | LRP; 23 | DOV | IRP | IOW | GLN | ISF | MAD | DSF | BRI | SLM | KAN | | 47th | 96 | |
| 2026 | Fast Track Racing | 9 | Ford | DAY | PHO; 36 | | | | | | | | | | | | | | | | | | | 19th | 265 | |
| 2026 | Maples Motorsports | 1 | Chevy | | | KAN; 29 | TAL | | | | | | | | | | | | | | | | | 19th | 265 | |
| 2026 | Wayne Peterson Racing | 06 | Toyota | | | | | GLN; 31 | TOL; 16 | MCH | POC | BER; 16 | ELK; 17 | | LRP; 24 | | | | | | | | | 19th | 265 | |
| 2026 | Clubb Racing Inc. | 83 | Ford | | | | | | | | | | | CHI; 27 | | | | | | | | | | 19th | 265 | |
| 2026 | Wayne Peterson Racing | 0 | Toyota | | | | | | | | | | | | | IRP; 25 | | | | | | | | 19th | 265 | |
| 2026 | Wayne Peterson Racing | 0 | Chevy | | | | | | | | | | | | | | IOW; 30 | ISF | MAD | | | BRI; 35 | | 19th | 265 | |
| 2026 | Wayne Peterson Racing | 06 | Ford | | | | | | | | | | | | | | | | | DSF; 19 | | | | 19th | 265 | |
| 2026 | Kimmel Racing | 68 | Ford | | | | | | | | | | | | | | | | | | SLM; 22 | | | 19th | 265 | |
| 2026 | Wayne Peterson Racing | 06 | Chevy | | | | | | | | | | | | | | | | | | | | KAN; 24 | 19th | 265 | |

==== ARCA Menards Series East ====
ARCA Menards Series East results
| Year | Team | No. | Make | 1 | 2 | 3 | 4 | 5 | 6 | 7 | 8 | AMSWC | Pts | Ref |
|---|---|---|---|---|---|---|---|---|---|---|---|---|---|---|
| 2022 | Wayne Peterson Racing | 06 | Ford | NSM | FIF; Wth | DOV | NSV; DNS | IOW | | | | 24th | 75 | |
| 2022 | Fast Track Racing | 10 | Ford | | FIF; 15 | | | | | | | 24th | 75 | |
| 2022 | Wayne Peterson Racing | 0 | Toyota | | | | | | MLW; 27 | BRI | | 24th | 75 | |
| 2023 | Wayne Peterson Racing | 06 | Toyota | FIF; 13 | DOV | NSV; 15 | FRS; 14 | IOW | | | | 19th | 111 | |
| 2023 | Wayne Peterson Racing | 0 | Toyota | | | | | | IRP; 23 | MLW | BRI | 19th | 111 | |
| 2024 | Wayne Peterson Racing | 0 | Ford | FIF; 16 | DOV | NSV; 17 | FRS; 16 | IOW | | | BRI; Wth | 15th | 186 | |
| 2024 | Wayne Peterson Racing | 0 | Toyota | | | | | | IRP; 28 | | | 15th | 186 | |
| 2024 | Wayne Peterson Racing | 06 | Ford | | | | | | | MLW; 21 | BRI; 30 | 15th | 186 | |
| 2025 | Wayne Peterson Racing | 06 | Toyota | FIF; 16 | CAR; 23 | NSV; 10 | FRS; 11 | DOV | IRP | IOW | BRI | 19th | 116 | |
| 2026 | Wayne Peterson Racing | 06 | Toyota | HCY; 14 | CAR; 16 | NSV; 12 | TOL; 16 | | FRS; 14 | | | 9th | 290 | |
| 2026 | Wayne Peterson Racing | 0 | Toyota | | | | | IRP; 25 | | | | 9th | 290 | |
| 2026 | Wayne Peterson Racing | 0 | Chevy | | | | | | | IOW; 30 | BRI; 35 | 9th | 290 | |

==== ARCA Menards Series West ====
ARCA Menards Series West results
| Year | Team | No. | Make | 1 | 2 | 3 | 4 | 5 | 6 | 7 | 8 | 9 | 10 | 11 | 12 | 13 | AMSWC | Pts | Ref |
|---|---|---|---|---|---|---|---|---|---|---|---|---|---|---|---|---|---|---|---|
| 2026 | Fast Track Racing | 9 | Ford | KER | PHO; 36 | TUC | SHA | CNS | TRI | SON | PIR | AAS | MAD | LVS | PHO | KER | 87th | 8 | |
