= 2026 Music City 150 =

ARCA Menards Series East race at Nashville Fairgrounds Speedway

2026 Cook Out Music City 150
Race details
- Race 3 of 8 in the 2026 ARCA Menards Series East
- Date: May 2, 2026
- Location: Nashville Fairgrounds Speedway in Nashville, Tennessee
- Course: Permanent racing facility
- Course length: 0.596 miles (0.959 km)
- Distance: 150 laps, 89.400 mi (143.875 km)
- Average speed: 79.624 miles per hour (128.142 km/h)

Pole position
Driver	Max Reaves	Joe Gibbs Racing
- Time: 19.181

Most laps led
Driver	Max Reaves	Joe Gibbs Racing
- Laps: 150

Fastest lap
Driver	Max Reaves	Joe Gibbs Racing
- Time: 19.646

Winner
No. 18	Max Reaves	Joe Gibbs Racing

Television in the United States
- Network: FloRacing; NASCAR Channel
- Announcers: Charles Krall lap by lap, Nathan Prouty analyst, & Jonathan Ramos reporter

Radio in the United States
- Radio: ARN

The 2026 Cook Out Music City 150 was an ARCA Menards Series East race held on Saturday, May 2, 2026, at Nashville Fairgrounds Speedway in Nashville, Tennessee. Contested over 150 laps on the 0.596 mile (0.959 km) short track, it was the third race of the 2026 ARCA Menards Series East season, and the sixth running of the event.

Max Reaves, driving for Joe Gibbs Racing, pulled off a dominating performance, leading every lap from the pole position to earn his fourth career ARCA Menards Series East win, and his first of the season. Landon S. Huffman finished second, and Tristan McKee finished third. Hunter Wright and Isaac Kitzmiller rounded out the top five, while Craig Pellegrini Jr., Toro Rodríguez, Jackson McLerran, Carson Brown, and Ivis Earley rounded out the top ten.

This was the first race of "ARCA Night in America", a doubleheader feature with the ARCA Menards Series West race on the same day, both being streamed on the NASCAR Channel and FloRacing.

== Report ==
=== Background ===
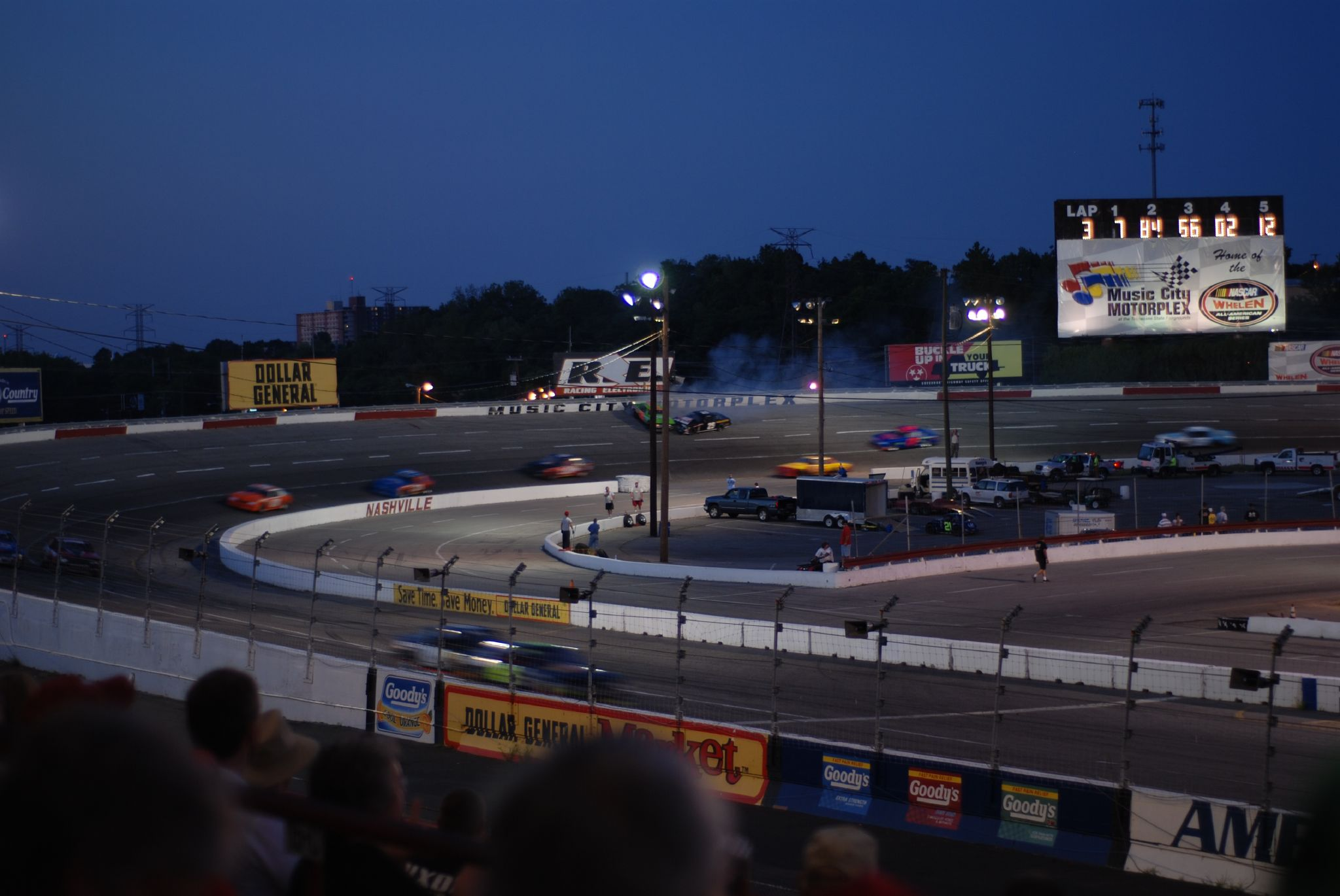
Nashville Fairgrounds Speedway, the track where the race was held.

Nashville Fairgrounds Speedway is a motorsport racetrack located at the Nashville Fairgrounds near downtown Nashville, Tennessee. The track is the second oldest continually operating track in the United States. The track held NASCAR Grand National/Winston Cup (now NASCAR Cup Series) races from 1958 to 1984.

The speedway is currently an 18-degree banked paved oval. The track is 0.596 mi (0.959 km) long. Inside the larger oval is a 1/4 mi (0.40 km) paved oval.

The track was converted to a 1/2 mi (0.80 km) paved oval in 1957, when it began to be a NASCAR series track. The speedway was lengthened between the 1969 and 1970 seasons. The corners were cut down from 35 degrees to their present 18 degrees in 1972. The track was repaved between the 1995 and 1996 seasons.

==== Entry list ====
- (R) denotes rookie driver.

#	Driver	Team	Make
00	Toby Blanton	Jet Daddy Racing	Chevrolet
0	Brayton Laster	Wayne Peterson Motorsports	Toyota
03	Jeff Maconi	Clubb Racing Inc.	Ford
06	Nate Moeller	Wayne Peterson Motorsports	Toyota
9	Landon S. Huffman	CR7 Motorsports	Chevrolet
10	Craig Pellegrini Jr. (R)	Fast Track Racing	Toyota
11	Chase Buscaglia	Fast Track Racing	Ford
12	Dustin Hillenburg	Fast Track Racing	Ford
13	Rita Goulet	Integrity Autosports	Toyota
18	Max Reaves (R)	Joe Gibbs Racing	Toyota
19	Austin Vaughn	Maples Motorsports	Ford
28	Carson Brown (R)	Pinnacle Racing Group	Chevrolet
34	Ivis Earley	VWV Racing	Toyota
38	Toro Rodríguez	MCM Racing Development	Toyota
69	Landon Brown	Kimmel Racing	Ford
77	Tristan McKee (R)	Pinnacle Racing Group	Chevrolet
79	Isaac Kitzmiller	ACR Motorsports	Chevrolet
85	Quinn Davis (R)	City Garage Motorsports	Ford
86	Alex Clubb	Clubb Racing Inc.	Ford
95	Hunter Wright	MAN Motorsports	Toyota
96	Jackson McLerran	MAN Motorsports	Toyota
99	Michael Maples	Maples Motorsports	Chevrolet
Official entry list

== Practice ==
The first and only practice session was held on Saturday, May 2, at 2:00 PM CST, and lasted for 45 minutes.

Max Reaves, driving for Joe Gibbs Racing, set the fastest time in the session, with a lap of 19.405 seconds, and a speed of 110.569 miles per hour (177.944 km/h).

=== Practice results ===
Pos.	#	Driver	Team	Make	Time	Speed
1	18	Max Reaves (R)	Joe Gibbs Racing	Toyota	19.405	110.569
2	28	Carson Brown (R)	Pinnacle Racing Group	Chevrolet	19.577	109.598
3	77	Tristan McKee (R)	Pinnacle Racing Group	Chevrolet	19.835	108.172
Full practice results

== Qualifying ==
Qualifying was held on Saturday, May 2, at 4:00 PM CST. The qualifying procedure used was a single-car, two-lap based system. Drivers were on track by themselves and had two laps to post a qualifying time, and whoever set the fastest time won the pole.

Max Reaves, driving for Joe Gibbs Racing, qualified on pole position with a lap of 19.181 seconds, and a speed of 111.861 miles per hour (180.023 km/h).

=== Qualifying results ===
Pos.	#	Driver	Team	Make	Time	Speed
1	18	Max Reaves (R)	Joe Gibbs Racing	Toyota	19.181	111.861
2	28	Carson Brown (R)	Pinnacle Racing Group	Chevrolet	19.414	110.518
3	79	Isaac Kitzmiller	ACR Motorsports	Chevrolet	19.487	110.104
4	77	Tristan McKee (R)	Pinnacle Racing Group	Chevrolet	19.643	109.230
5	9	Landon S. Huffman	CR7 Motorsports	Chevrolet	19.658	109.146
6	69	Landon Brown	Kimmel Racing	Ford	19.832	108.189
7	85	Quinn Davis (R)	City Garage Motorsports	Ford	19.873	107.966
8	95	Hunter Wright	MAN Motorsports	Toyota	19.935	107.630
9	38	Toro Rodríguez	MCM Racing Development	Toyota	20.007	107.242
10	96	Jackson McLerran	MAN Motorsports	Toyota	20.089	106.805
11	10	Craig Pellegrini Jr. (R)	Fast Track Racing	Toyota	20.157	106.444
12	19	Austin Vaughn	Maples Motorsports	Ford	20.923	102.547
13	11	Chase Buscaglia	Fast Track Racing	Ford	21.386	100.327
14	13	Rita Goulet	Integrity Autosports	Toyota	21.475	99.912
15	99	Michael Maples	Maples Motorsports	Chevrolet	21.485	99.865
16	12	Dustin Hillenburg	Fast Track Racing	Ford	21.744	98.675
17	34	Ivis Earley	VWV Racing	Toyota	22.050	97.306
18	06	Nate Moeller	Wayne Peterson Motorsports	Toyota	22.117	97.011
19	03	Jeff Maconi	Clubb Racing Inc.	Ford	23.230	92.363
20	00	Toby Blanton	Jet Daddy Racing	Chevrolet	23.582	90.985
21	0	Brayton Laster	Wayne Peterson Motorsports	Toyota	24.085	89.084
22	86	Alex Clubb	Clubb Racing Inc.	Ford	—	—
Official qualifying results

== Race ==
=== Race results ===
Laps: 150

Fin	St	#	Driver	Team	Make	Laps	Led	Status	Pts
1	1	18	Max Reaves (R)	Joe Gibbs Racing	Toyota	150	150	Running	49
2	5	9	Landon S. Huffman	CR7 Motorsports	Chevrolet	150	0	Running	42
3	4	77	Tristan McKee (R)	Pinnacle Racing Group	Chevrolet	150	0	Running	41
4	8	95	Hunter Wright	MAN Motorsports	Toyota	150	0	Running	40
5	3	79	Isaac Kitzmiller	ACR Motorsports	Chevrolet	150	0	Running	39
6	11	10	Craig Pellegrini Jr. (R)	Fast Track Racing	Toyota	150	0	Running	38
7	9	38	Toro Rodríguez	MCM Racing Development	Toyota	149	0	Running	37
8	10	96	Jackson McLerran	MAN Motorsports	Toyota	149	0	Running	36
9	2	28	Carson Brown (R)	Pinnacle Racing Group	Chevrolet	148	0	Running	35
10	17	34	Ivis Earley	VWV Racing	Toyota	141	0	Running	34
11	13	11	Chase Buscaglia	Fast Track Racing	Ford	140	0	Running	33
12	18	06	Nate Moeller	Wayne Peterson Motorsports	Toyota	139	0	Running	32
13	14	13	Rita Goulet	Integrity Autosports	Toyota	139	0	Running	31
14	12	19	Austin Vaughn	Maples Motorsports	Ford	137	0	Running	30
15	20	00	Toby Blanton	Jet Daddy Racing	Chevrolet	134	0	Running	29
16	7	85	Quinn Davis (R)	City Garage Motorsports	Ford	120	0	Accident	28
17	6	69	Landon Brown	Kimmel Racing	Ford	78	0	Mechanical	27
18	15	99	Michael Maples	Maples Motorsports	Chevrolet	41	0	Accident	26
19	19	03	Jeff Maconi	Clubb Racing Inc.	Ford	41	0	Accident	25
20	16	12	Dustin Hillenburg	Fast Track Racing	Ford	40	0	Accident	24
21	21	0	Brayton Laster	Wayne Peterson Motorsports	Toyota	2	0	Quit	23
22	22	86	Alex Clubb	Clubb Racing Inc.	Ford	0	0	Did Not Start	22
Official race results

=== Race statistics ===
- Lead changes: 1 among 1 different driver
- Cautions/Laps: 4 for 31 laps
- Red flags: 0
- Time of race: 1 hour, 7 minutes and 2 seconds
- Average speed: 79.624 miles per hour (128.142 km/h)

== Standings after the race ==
Drivers' Championship standings

	Pos	Driver	Points
	1	Tristan McKee	137
1	2	Max Reaves	130 (–7)
1	3	Isaac Kitzmiller	121 (–16)
	4	Jackson McLerran	110 (–27)
1	5	Craig Pellegrini Jr.	107 (–30)
2	6	Austin Vaughn	94 (–43)
2	7	Nate Moeller	90 (–47)
12	8	Landon S. Huffman	81 (–56)
6	9	Toby Blanton	80 (–57)
4	10	Quinn Davis	79 (–58)

- Note: Only the first 10 positions are included for the driver standings.

Previous race: 2026 Rockingham ARCA Menards Series East 125	ARCA Menards Series East; 2026 season	Next race: 2026 Owens Corning 200
