= 2026 Spruce 212 =

ARCA Menards Series race at the Salem Speedway

Race details
- Race 18 of 20 in the 2026 ARCA Menards Series
- Date: September 12, 2026
- Location: Salem Speedway in Salem, Indiana
- Course: Permanent racing facility
- Course length: 0.555 miles (0.893 km)
- Distance: 216 laps, 119 mi (191 km)
- Scheduled distance: 212 laps, 117.66 mi (189.36 km)
- Average speed: 64.868 miles per hour (104.395 km/h)

Pole position
Driver	Max Reaves	Joe Gibbs Racing
- Time: 17.156

Most laps led
Driver	Max Reaves	Joe Gibbs Racing
- Laps: 216

Fastest lap
Driver	Max Reaves	Joe Gibbs Racing
- Time: 17.538

Winner
No. 18	Max Reaves	Joe Gibbs Racing

Television in the United States
- Network: Fox
- Announcers: Eric Brennan, Regan Smith, and Phil Parsons

Radio in the United States
- Radio: ARN

The 2026 Spruce 212 was an ARCA Menards Series race held on Saturday, September 12, 2026, at Salem Speedway in Salem, Indiana. Contested over 216 laps—extended from 212 laps due to an overtime finish on the 0.555 miles (0.893 km) asphalt oval, it was the 18th race of the 2026 ARCA Menards Series season, and the 29th running of the event. The race aired on FOX.

Max Reaves, driving for Joe Gibbs Racing, pulled off another dominating short track performance, leading all laps from the pole position to earn his seventh career ARCA Menards Series win, and his fourth of the season. Jake Bollman finished second, and Will Kimmel finished third. Landon S. Huffman and Isabella Robusto rounded out the top five, while Tristan McKee, Thomas Annunziata, Gavan Boschele, Austin Vaughn, and Carson Brown rounded out the top ten.

== Report ==
=== Background ===
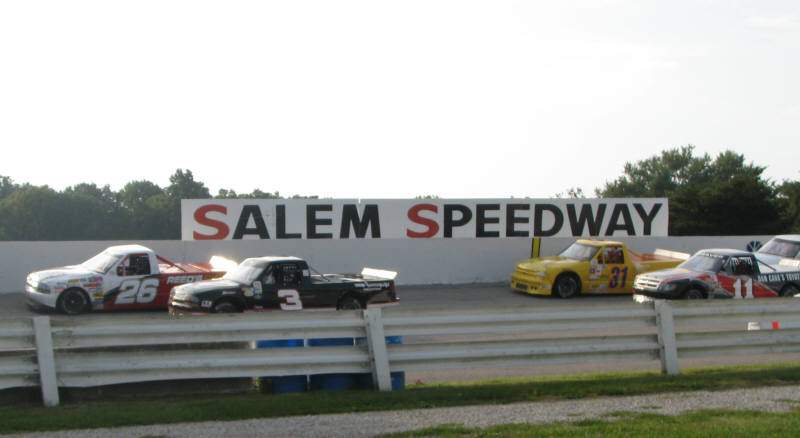
Salem Speedway, the track where the race was held.

Salem Speedway is a .555-mile (0.893 km) long paved oval racetrack in Washington Township, Washington County, near Salem, Indiana, United States, approximately 100 miles (160 km) south of Indianapolis. The track has 33° degrees of banking in the corners. Major auto racing series that run at Salem are ARCA and USAC.

==== Entry list ====
- (R) denotes rookie driver.

#	Driver	Team	Make
03	Alex Clubb	Clubb Racing Inc.	Ford
06	Ben Peterson	Wayne Peterson Motorsports	Ford
10	Ed Pompa	Fast Track Racing	Ford
11	Mike Basham	Fast Track Racing	Toyota
12	Takuma Koga	Fast Track Racing	Toyota
18	Max Reaves (R)	Joe Gibbs Racing	Toyota
20	Jake Bollman (R)	Nitro Motorsports	Toyota
25	Gavan Boschele (R)	Nitro Motorsports	Toyota
28	Carson Brown (R)	Pinnacle Racing Group	Chevrolet
42	Taylor Mayhew	Cook Racing Technologies	Chevrolet
48	Brad Smith	Brad Smith Motorsports	Ford
55	Isabella Robusto	Nitro Motorsports	Toyota
68	Nate Moeller	Kimmel Racing	Ford
69	Will Kimmel	Kimmel Racing	Ford
70	Thomas Annunziata	Nitro Motorsports	Toyota
77	Tristan McKee	Pinnacle Racing Group	Chevrolet
79	Matt Kemp	ACR Motorsports	Chevrolet
81	Kevin Campbell	KC Motorsports	Chevrolet
86	Jeff Maconi (R)	Clubb Racing Inc.	Ford
89	Quinn Davis	Rise Racing	Chevrolet
91	Austin Vaughn	Maples Motorsports	Ford
97	Landon S. Huffman	CR7 Motorsports	Chevrolet
99	Michael Maples	Maples Motorsports	Chevrolet
Official entry list

== Practice ==
The first and only practice session was held on Saturday, September 12, at 3:00 PM EST, and lasted for 45 minutes.

Tristan McKee, driving for Pinnacle Racing Group, set the fastest time in the session, with a lap of 17.227 seconds, and a speed of 115.981 miles per hour (186.653 km/h).

Pos.	#	Driver	Team	Make	Time	Speed
1	77	Tristan McKee	Pinnacle Racing Group	Chevrolet	17.227	115.981
2	18	Max Reaves (R)	Joe Gibbs Racing	Toyota	17.234	115.934
3	28	Carson Brown (R)	Pinnacle Racing Group	Chevrolet	17.254	115.799
Full practice results

== Qualifying ==
Qualifying was held on Saturday, September 12, at 4:30 PM EST. The qualifying procedure used was a single-car, two-lap system with one round. Drivers were on track by themselves and had two laps to post a qualifying time, and whoever set the fastest time won the pole.

Max Reaves, driving for Joe Gibbs Racing, qualified on pole position with a lap of 17.156 seconds, and a speed of 116.461 miles per hour (187.426 km/h).

=== Qualifying results ===
Pos.	#	Driver	Team	Make	Time	Speed
1	18	Max Reaves (R)	Joe Gibbs Racing	Toyota	17.156	116.461
2	77	Tristan McKee (R)	Pinnacle Racing Group	Chevrolet	17.303	115.471
3	28	Carson Brown (R)	Pinnacle Racing Group	Chevrolet	17.314	115.398
4	69	Will Kimmel	Kimmel Racing	Ford	17.381	114.953
5	70	Thomas Annunziata	Nitro Motorsports	Toyota	17.490	114.237
6	55	Isabella Robusto	Nitro Motorsports	Toyota	17.587	113.607
7	97	Landon S. Huffman	CR7 Motorsports	Chevrolet	17.671	113.067
8	20	Jake Bollman (R)	Nitro Motorsports	Toyota	17.735	112.659
9	25	Gavan Boschele (R)	Nitro Motorsports	Toyota	17.765	112.468
10	42	Taylor Mayhew	Cook Racing Technologies	Chevrolet	18.180	109.901
11	91	Austin Vaughn	Maples Motorsports	Ford	18.447	108.310
12	12	Takuma Koga	Fast Track Racing	Toyota	18.465	108.205
13	10	Ed Pompa	Fast Track Racing	Ford	18.726	106.697
14	11	Mike Basham	Fast Track Racing	Toyota	19.048	104.893
15	99	Michael Maples	Maples Motorsports	Chevrolet	19.137	104.405
16	89	Quinn Davis	Rise Racing	Chevrolet	19.565	102.121
17	48	Brad Smith	Brad Smith Motorsports	Ford	19.671	101.571
18	06	Ben Peterson	Wayne Peterson Motorsports	Ford	19.673	101.561
19	03	Alex Clubb	Clubb Racing Inc.	Ford	19.753	101.149
20	86	Jeff Maconi (R)	Clubb Racing Inc.	Ford	20.668	96.671
21	81	Kevin Campbell	KC Motorsports	Chevrolet	21.468	93.069
22	68	Nate Moeller	Kimmel Racing	Ford	22.308	89.564
23	79	Matt Kemp	ACR Motorsports	Chevrolet	—	—
Official qualifying results

== Race ==
=== Race results ===
Laps: 216

Fin	St	#	Driver	Team	Make	Laps	Led	Status	Pts
1	1	18	Max Reaves (R)	Joe Gibbs Racing	Toyota	216	216	Running	49
2	8	20	Jake Bollman (R)	Nitro Motorsports	Toyota	216	0	Running	42
3	4	69	Will Kimmel	Kimmel Racing	Ford	216	0	Running	41
4	7	97	Landon S. Huffman	CR7 Motorsports	Chevrolet	216	0	Running	40
5	6	55	Isabella Robusto	Nitro Motorsports	Toyota	216	0	Running	39
6	2	77	Tristan McKee	Pinnacle Racing Group	Chevrolet	216	0	Running	38
7	5	70	Thomas Annunziata	Nitro Motorsports	Toyota	216	0	Running	37
8	9	25	Gavan Boschele (R)	Nitro Motorsports	Toyota	216	0	Running	36
9	11	91	Austin Vaughn	Maples Motorsports	Ford	216	0	Running	35
10	3	28	Carson Brown (R)	Pinnacle Racing Group	Chevrolet	215	0	Running	34
11	14	11	Mike Basham	Fast Track Racing	Toyota	208	0	Running	33
12	13	10	Ed Pompa	Fast Track Racing	Ford	207	0	Running	32
13	12	12	Takuma Koga	Fast Track Racing	Toyota	204	0	Running	31
14	15	99	Michael Maples	Maples Motorsports	Chevrolet	201	0	Running	30
15	20	86	Jeff Maconi (R)	Clubb Racing Inc.	Ford	194	0	Running	29
16	17	48	Brad Smith	Brad Smith Motorsports	Ford	191	0	Running	28
17	16	89	Quinn Davis	Rise Racing	Chevrolet	177	0	Running	27
18	10	42	Taylor Mayhew	Cook Racing Technologies	Chevrolet	172	0	Mechanical	26
19	18	06	Ben Peterson	Wayne Peterson Motorsports	Ford	143	0	Accident	25
20	19	03	Alex Clubb	Clubb Racing Inc.	Ford	57	0	Mechanical	24
21	21	81	Kevin Campbell	KC Motorsports	Chevrolet	5	0	Mechanical	23
22	22	68	Nate Moeller	Kimmel Racing	Ford	4	0	Mechanical	22
23	23	79	Matt Kemp	ACR Motorsports	Chevrolet	2	0	Mechanical	21
Official race results

=== Race statistics ===
- Lead changes: 0 among 1 different driver
- Cautions/Laps: 10 for 61 laps
- Red flags: 0
- Time of race: 1 hour, 50 minutes and 53 seconds
- Average speed: 64.868 miles per hour (104.395 km/h)

== Standings after the race ==
Drivers' Championship standings

	Pos	Driver	Points
	1	Jake Bollman	836
	2	Thomas Annunziata	823 (–13)
1	3	Isabella Robusto	704 (–132)
1	4	Jason Kitzmiller	666 (–170)
	5	Takuma Koga	652 (–184)
1	6	Michael Maples	590 (–246)
1	7	Alex Clubb	586 (–250)
	8	Brad Smith	512 (–324)
	9	Jeff Maconi	493 (–343)
	10	Max Reaves	483 (–353)

- Note: Only the first 10 positions are included for the driver standings.

Previous race: 2026 Audubon Park 100	ARCA Menards Series; 2026 season	Next race: 2026 Bush's Beans 200
