= 2026 Cook Out 400 =

2026 Cook Out 400 may refer to:

- 2026 Cook Out 400 (Martinsville), at Martinsville Speedway on March 29
- 2026 Cook Out 400 (Richmond), at Richmond Raceway on August 15

== See also ==
- 2026 Cook Out Clash, at Bowman Gray Stadium on February 4
- 2026 Cook Out 200, an ARCA Menards Series East race at Hickory Motor Speedway on March 28
- 2026 Cook Out Music City 150, an ARCA Menards Series East race at Nashville Fairgrounds Speedway on May 2
- 2026 Cook Out Southern 500, at Darlington Raceway on September 6
