= Derek Kneeland =

American racing driver and spotter

- Born: June 20, 1986 (age 40); Windham, Maine, U.S.

ARCA Menards Series East career
- 1 race run over 1 year
- Best finish: 45th (2026)
- First race: 2026 Cook Out 200 (Hickory)
Wins	Top tens	Poles
0	1	0
- Statistics up to date as of March 28, 2026.

Derek Kneeland (born June 20, 1986) is an American professional spotter and stock car racing driver who works for Richard Childress Racing as a spotter of their No. 33 Chevrolet Camaro ZL1 in the NASCAR Cup Series driven by Austin Hill (previously the No. 8 driven by Kyle Busch), and the No. 21 Chevrolet Camaro SS in the NASCAR O'Reilly Auto Parts Series, also driven by Austin Hill. As a driver, he last competed part-time in the ARCA Menards Series East, driving the No. 28 Chevrolet for Pinnacle Racing Group.

Kneeland has previously worked for teams such as Chip Ganassi Racing and Rev Racing.

== Career ==
Kneeland first began racing at the age of eight, where he raced in go-karts at Patrick Motor Speedway up until the track shut down when he was 17. After that, his driving career was halted.

Kneeland's first spotting job came when he served as a spotter for Corey Williams, a driver in the PASS South Super Late Model Series. He would later build a friendship with fellow driver Brian Scott, and eventually spotted for him when Scott entered into the ARCA Re/Max Series.

On March 3, 2026, it was revealed that Kneeland would make his debut in the ARCA Menards Series East at Hickory Motor Speedway, driving the No. 28 Chevrolet for Pinnacle Racing Group.

As a driver, Kneeland has competed in series such as the PASS North Super Late Model Series, the PASS National Championship Super Late Model Series, the UARA National Late Model Series, the Oxford Crown Jewel Triple Crown Series, and the NASCAR Weekly Series.

== Personal life ==
Kneeland's father, Jeff, was a former racing driver who competed in the 1970s, and his grandfather was a former general manager of the now-defunct Beech Ridge Motor Speedway.

== Motorsports career results ==
=== Stock car career summary ===
Season	Series	Team	Races	Wins	Top 5	Top 10	Points	Position
2026	ARCA Menards Series East	Pinnacle Racing Group	1	0	1	1	40	45th

=== ARCA Menards Series East ===
(key) (Bold – Pole position awarded by qualifying time. Italics – Pole position earned by points standings or practice time. * – Most laps led.)

ARCA Menards Series East results
Year	Team	No.	Make	1	2	3	4	5	6	7	8	AMSEC	Pts	Ref
2026	Pinnacle Racing Group	28	Chevy	HCY; 4	CAR	NSV	TOL	IRP	FRS	IOW	BRI	45th	40	
