= 2026 Cook Out 200 =

ARCA Menards Series East race at Hickory Motor Speedway

Race details
- Race 1 of 8 in the 2026 ARCA Menards Series East
- Date: March 28, 2026
- Location: Hickory Motor Speedway in Hickory, North Carolina
- Course: Permanent racing facility
- Course length: 0.363 miles (0.584 km)
- Distance: 200 laps, 72.6 mi (116.838 km)
- Average speed: 55.396 miles per hour (89.151 km/h)

Pole position
Driver	Max Reaves	Joe Gibbs Racing
- Time: 15.036

Most laps led
Driver	Max Reaves	Joe Gibbs Racing
- Laps: 186

Fastest lap
Driver	Max Reaves	Joe Gibbs Racing
- Time: 15.272

Winner
No. 77	Tristan McKee	Pinnacle Racing Group

Television in the United States
- Network: FloRacing; NASCAR Channel
- Announcers: Charles Krall and Phil Parsons

Radio in the United States
- Radio: ARN

The 2026 Cook Out 200 was an ARCA Menards Series East race held on Saturday, March 28, 2026, at Hickory Motor Speedway in Hickory, North Carolina. Contested over 200 laps on the 0.363 miles (0.584 km) short track, it was the first race of the 2026 ARCA Menards Series East season, and the inaugural running of the event.

In a chaotic race, Tristan McKee, driving for Pinnacle Racing Group, survived an aggressive battle for the lead in the final laps, and pulled away from Max Reaves on the final restart to earn his first career ARCA Menards Series East win. Reaves had dominated the event by leading a race-high 186 laps from the pole position, before getting shuffled back and finishing second. Isaac Kitzmiller finished third, with Derek Kneeland and Nick Tucker rounding out the top five. Landon S. Huffman, Dystany Spurlock, Jackson McLerran, Craig Pellegrini Jr., and Austin Vaughn rounded out the top ten.

The race also made history as Spurlock became the first African American woman to compete in a NASCAR-sanctioned event, finishing seventh in her debut with MBM Motorsports.

== Report ==
=== Background ===
Hickory Motor Speedway (formerly known as the Hickory Speedway from 1952 to 1988) is a 0.363 mi (0.584 km) oval short track in Newton, North Carolina. The track primarily holds NASCAR Advance Auto Parts Weekly Series season, CARS Tour, SMART Modified Tour, and ARCA Menards Series East races. It also formerly held top-tier NASCAR Cup Series and second-tier NASCAR Busch Series races. Hickory Motor Speedway is owned by Benny Yonnt and led by track promoter Kevin Piercy.

Built in 1952 by Charlie Combs as a dirt track, the facility held its first races in the same year running NASCAR-sanctioned races. The track changed hands in ownership numerous times in its early years. After it was purchased by Bill Edwards and Ed Griffin, the track was paved with asphalt in 1967. After the paving, ownership was again frequently changed until Benny Yount purchased the track in 1986. Under Yount's ownership, periodical renovations to fan amenities and the track itself were made to the facility. In 1999, all NASCAR national touring series left the track following the 1998 season. The track remains for local racing and the NASCAR Weekly Series.

==== Entry list ====
- (R) denotes rookie driver.

#	Driver	Team	Make
00	Toby Blanton	Jet Daddy Racing	Chevrolet
0	George Siciliano	Rette Jones Racing	Ford
06	Nate Moeller	Wayne Peterson Motorsports	Toyota
9	Landon S. Huffman	CR7 Motorsports	Chevrolet
10	Craig Pellegrini Jr. (R)	Fast Track Racing	Toyota
11	Matt Kemp	Fast Track Racing	Ford
12	Dustin Hillenburg	Fast Track Racing	Ford
13	Brian Weber	Integrity Autosports	Toyota
14	Tim Monroe	Tim Monroe Racing	Ford
18	Max Reaves (R)	Joe Gibbs Racing	Toyota
19	Austin Vaughn	Maples Motorsports	Ford
24	Connor Hall	SPS Racing	Chevrolet
28	Derek Kneeland	Pinnacle Racing Group	Chevrolet
34	Brian Barbarow	WAV Racing	Toyota
38	Toro Rodríguez	MCM Racing Development	Toyota
57	Hunter Deshautelle	Brother-In-Law Racing	Chevrolet
66	Dystany Spurlock	MBM Motorsports	Chevrolet
70	Nick Tucker	Nitro Motorsports	Toyota
77	Tristan McKee (R)	Pinnacle Racing Group	Chevrolet
79	Isaac Kitzmiller	ACR Motorsports	Chevrolet
85	Quinn Davis (R)	City Garage Motorsports	Ford
95	Jackson McLerran	MAN Motorsports	Toyota
99	Michael Maples	Maples Motorsports	Chevrolet
Official entry list

== Practice ==
The first and only practice session was held on Saturday, March 28, at 2:15 PM EST, and lasted for 45 minutes.

Max Reaves, driving for Joe Gibbs Racing, set the fastest time in the session, with a lap of 15.065 seconds, and a speed of 86.744 miles per hour (139.601 km/h).

=== Practice results ===
Pos.	#	Driver	Team	Make	Time	Speed
1	18	Max Reaves (R)	Joe Gibbs Racing	Toyota	15.065	86.744
2	9	Landon S. Huffman	CR7 Motorsports	Chevrolet	15.342	85.178
3	70	Nick Tucker	Nitro Motorsports	Toyota	15.357	85.095
Full practice results

== Qualifying ==
Qualifying was held on Saturday, March 28, at 4:00 PM EST. The qualifying procedure used was a single-car, two-lap system with one round. Drivers were on track by themselves and had two laps to post a qualifying time, and whoever set the fastest time won the pole.

Max Reaves, driving for Joe Gibbs Racing, qualified on pole position with a lap of 15.036 seconds, and a speed of 86.911 miles per hour (139.870 km/h).

=== Qualifying results ===
Pos.	#	Driver	Team	Make	Time	Speed
1	18	Max Reaves (R)	Joe Gibbs Racing	Toyota	15.036	86.911
2	28	Derek Kneeland	Pinnacle Racing Group	Chevrolet	15.109	86.491
3	70	Nick Tucker	Nitro Motorsports	Toyota	15.181	86.081
4	24	Connor Hall	SPS Racing	Chevrolet	15.228	85.816
5	9	Landon S. Huffman	CR7 Motorsports	Chevrolet	15.251	85.686
6	79	Isaac Kitzmiller	ACR Motorsports	Chevrolet	15.293	85.451
7	77	Tristan McKee (R)	Pinnacle Racing Group	Chevrolet	15.404	84.835
8	66	Dystany Spurlock	MBM Motorsports	Chevrolet	15.529	84.152
9	0	George Siciliano	Rette Jones Racing	Ford	15.567	83.947
10	85	Quinn Davis (R)	City Garage Motorsports	Ford	15.569	83.936
11	38	Toro Rodríguez	MCM Racing Development	Toyota	15.679	83.347
12	19	Austin Vaughn	Maples Motorsports	Ford	15.857	82.412
13	95	Jackson McLerran	MAN Motorsports	Toyota	15.912	82.127
14	10	Craig Pellegrini Jr. (R)	Fast Track Racing	Toyota	16.035	81.497
15	11	Matt Kemp	Fast Track Racing	Ford	16.101	81.163
16	57	Hunter Deshautelle	Brother-In-Law Racing	Chevrolet	16.212	80.607
17	13	Brian Weber	Integrity Autosports	Toyota	16.750	78.018
18	99	Michael Maples	Maples Motorsports	Chevrolet	16.794	77.814
19	00	Toby Blanton	Jet Daddy Racing	Chevrolet	16.903	77.312
20	12	Dustin Hillenburg	Fast Track Racing	Ford	17.006	76.843
21	06	Nate Moeller	Wayne Peterson Motorsports	Toyota	17.117	76.345
22	34	Brian Barbarow	WAV Racing	Toyota	17.724	73.731
23	14	Tim Monroe	Tim Monroe Racing	Ford	—	—
Official qualifying results

== Race ==
=== Race results ===
Laps: 200

Fin	St	#	Driver	Team	Make	Laps	Led	Status	Pts
1	7	77	Tristan McKee (R)	Pinnacle Racing Group	Chevrolet	200	13	Running	47
2	1	18	Max Reaves (R)	Joe Gibbs Racing	Toyota	200	186	Running	45
3	6	79	Isaac Kitzmiller	ACR Motorsports	Chevrolet	200	0	Running	41
4	2	28	Derek Kneeland	Pinnacle Racing Group	Chevrolet	200	0	Running	40
5	3	70	Nick Tucker	Nitro Motorsports	Toyota	200	0	Running	39
6	5	9	Landon S. Huffman	CR7 Motorsports	Chevrolet	200	1	Running	39
7	8	66	Dystany Spurlock	MBM Motorsports	Chevrolet	200	0	Running	37
8	13	95	Jackson McLerran	MAN Motorsports	Toyota	200	0	Running	36
9	14	10	Craig Pellegrini Jr. (R)	Fast Track Racing	Toyota	198	0	Running	35
10	12	19	Austin Vaughn	Maples Motorsports	Ford	197	0	Running	34
11	11	38	Toro Rodríguez	MCM Racing Development	Toyota	196	0	Running	33
12	16	57	Hunter Deshautelle	Brother-In-Law Racing	Chevrolet	195	0	Running	32
13	9	0	George Siciliano	Rette Jones Racing	Ford	193	0	Running	31
14	21	06	Nate Moeller	Wayne Peterson Motorsports	Toyota	185	0	Running	30
15	4	24	Connor Hall	SPS Racing	Chevrolet	182	0	Mechanical	29
16	10	85	Quinn Davis (R)	City Garage Motorsports	Ford	165	0	Running	28
17	18	99	Michael Maples	Maples Motorsports	Chevrolet	162	0	Running	27
18	22	34	Brian Barbarow	WAV Racing	Toyota	161	0	Handling	26
19	19	00	Toby Blanton	Jet Daddy Racing	Chevrolet	146	0	Running	25
20	17	13	Brian Weber	Integrity Autosports	Toyota	129	0	Mechanical	24
21	15	11	Matt Kemp	Fast Track Racing	Ford	19	0	Mechanical	23
22	20	12	Dustin Hillenburg	Fast Track Racing	Ford	14	0	Mechanical	22
23	23	14	Tim Monroe	Tim Monroe Racing	Ford	1	0	Mechanical	21
Official race results

=== Race statistics ===
- Lead changes: 3 among 3 different drivers
- Cautions/Laps: 9 for 56 laps
- Red flags: 0
- Time of race: 1 hour, 17 minutes and 5 seconds
- Average speed: 55.396 miles per hour (89.151 km/h)

== Standings after the race ==
Drivers' Championship standings

Pos	Driver	Points
1	Tristan McKee	47
2	Max Reaves	45 (–2)
3	Isaac Kitzmiller	41 (–6)
4	Derek Kneeland	40 (–7)
5	Nick Tucker	39 (–8)
6	Landon S. Huffman	39 (–8)
7	Dystany Spurlock	37 (–10)
8	Jackson McLerran	36 (–11)
9	Craig Pellegrini Jr.	35 (–12)
10	Austin Vaughn	34 (–13)

- Note: Only the first 10 positions are included for the driver standings.

Previous race: 2025 Bush's Beans 200	ARCA Menards Series East; 2026 season	Next race: 2026 Rockingham ARCA Menards Series East 125
