= Hunter Wright =

American racing driver

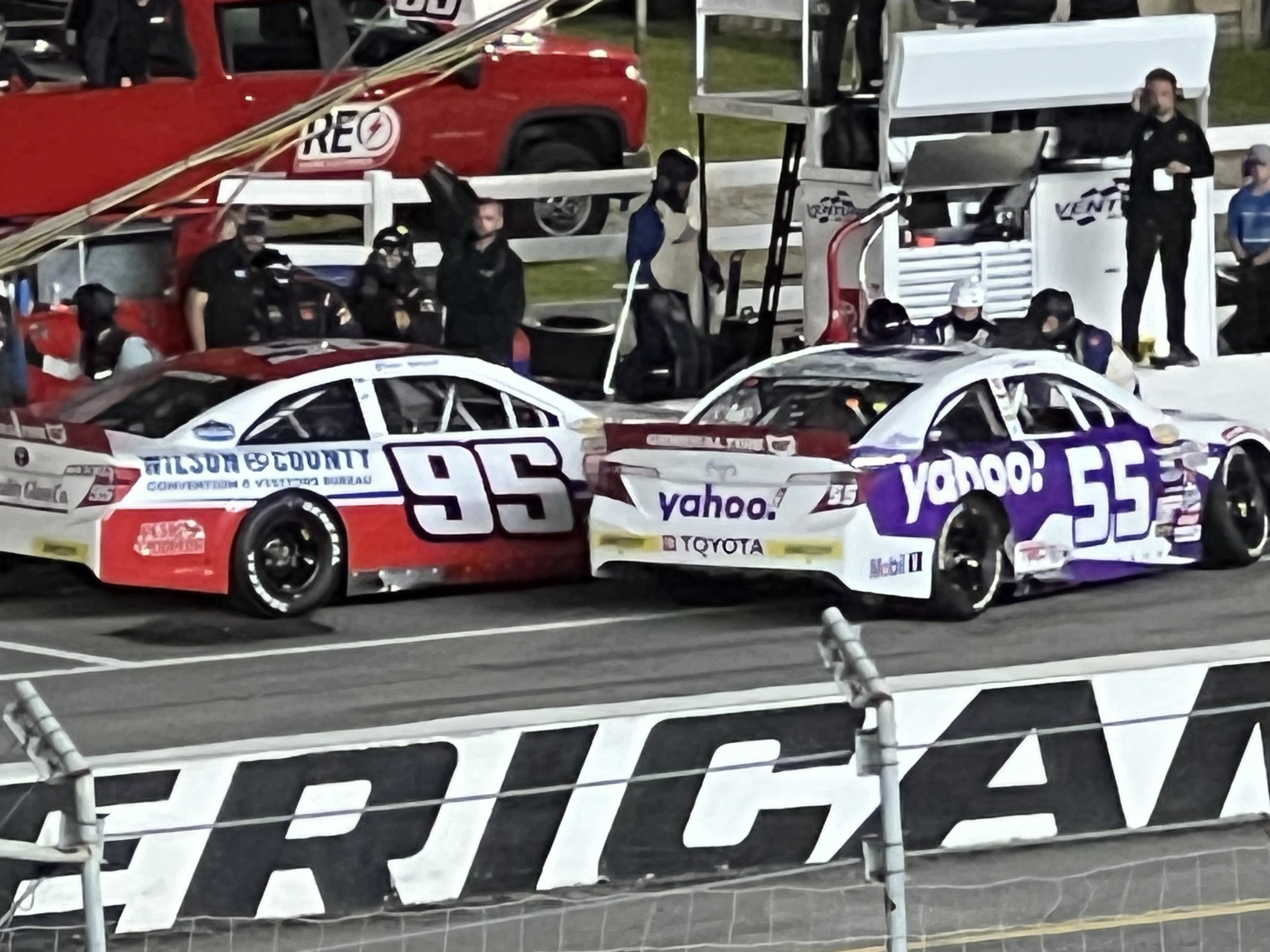
- Wright's' No. 95 car (left) at Nashville Fairgrounds Speedway in 2024
- Born: January 4, 2001 (age 25); Lebanon, Tennessee, U.S.

ARCA Menards Series career
- 3 races run over 2 years
- Best finish: 76th (2026)
- First race: 2025 LiUNA! 150 (IRP)
- Last race: 2026 Bush's Best 200 (Bristol)
| Wins | Top tens | Poles |
|---|---|---|
| 0 | 1 | 0 |

ARCA Menards Series East career
- 8 races run over 3 years
- Best finish: 22nd (2025)
- First race: 2024 Pensacola 150 (Pensacola)
- Last race: 2026 Bush's Best 200 (Bristol)
| Wins | Top tens | Poles |
|---|---|---|
| 0 | 6 | 0 |
- Statistics up to date as of September 26, 2026.

Hunter Wright (born January 4, 2001) is an American professional stock car racing driver. He last competed part-time in the ARCA Menards Series East, driving the No. 95 Toyota for MAN Motorsports.

== Racing career ==
From 2019 to 2023, Wright competed in series such as the CRA JEGS All-Stars Tour, the World Series of Asphalt Stock Car Racing Series, where he won the track championship at New Smyrna Speedway in early 2024, the Show Me The Money Pro Late Model Series, and the ASA Southern Super Series.

In 2024, it was revealed that Wright would make his debut in the ARCA Menards Series East at Five Flags Speedway, driving the No. 95 Toyota for MAN Motorsports. After placing fifth in the lone practice session, he qualified in sixth and finished two laps down in fifth place.

== Personal life ==
Wright graduated from Wilson Central High School in 2019.

== Motorsports career results ==
=== Racing career summary ===
| Season | Series | Team | Races | Wins | Top 5 | Top 10 | Points | Position |
|---|---|---|---|---|---|---|---|---|
| 2023 | ASA STARS National Tour | Day Enterprises | 1 | 0 | 0 | 0 | 35 | 81st |
| 2024 | ASA STARS National Tour | Day Enterprises | 2 | 0 | 0 | 0 | 50 | 52nd |
| 2024 | ARCA Menards Series East | MAN Motorsports | 2 | 0 | 1 | 2 | 74 | 26th |
| 2025 | ARCA Menards Series East | MAN Motorsports | 3 | 0 | 1 | 3 | 111 | 22nd |
| 2025 | ARCA Menards Series | MAN Motorsports | 1 | 0 | 0 | 1 | 35 | 100th |
| 2026 | ASA STARS National Tour | Day Enterprises | 1 | 0 | 0 | 0 | 20* | 59th* |
| 2026 | CARS Pro Late Model Tour | Day Enterprises | 1 | 0 | 0 | 0 | 22 | 67th |
| 2026 | ARCA Menards Series East | MAN Motorsports | 3 | 0 | 1 | 1 | 84 | 28th |
| 2026 | ARCA Menards Series | MAN Motorsports | 2 | 0 | 0 | 0 | 44 | 73rd |

=== ARCA Menards Series ===
(key) (Bold – Pole position awarded by qualifying time. Italics – Pole position earned by points standings or practice time. * – Most laps led.)

ARCA Menards Series results
| Year | Team | No. | Make | 1 | 2 | 3 | 4 | 5 | 6 | 7 | 8 | 9 | 10 | 11 | 12 | 13 | 14 | 15 | 16 | 17 | 18 | 19 | 20 | AMSC | Pts | Ref |
|---|---|---|---|---|---|---|---|---|---|---|---|---|---|---|---|---|---|---|---|---|---|---|---|---|---|---|
| 2025 | MAN Motorsports | 95 | Toyota | DAY | PHO | TAL | KAN | CLT | MCH | BLN | ELK | LRP | DOV | IRP; 9 | IOW | GLN | ISF | MAD | DSF | BRI | SLM | KAN | TOL | 100th | 35 | |
| 2026 | MAN Motorsports | 95 | Toyota | DAY | PHO | KAN | TAL | GLN | TOL | MCH | POC | BER | ELK | CHI | LRP | IRP; 12 | IOW | ISF | MAD | DSF | SLM | BRI; 32 | KAN | 76th | 44 | |

==== ARCA Menards Series East ====
ARCA Menards Series East results
| Year | Team | No. | Make | 1 | 2 | 3 | 4 | 5 | 6 | 7 | 8 | AMSEC | Pts | Ref |
|---|---|---|---|---|---|---|---|---|---|---|---|---|---|---|
| 2024 | MAN Motorsports | 95 | Toyota | FIF; 5 | DOV | NSV; 9 | FRS | IOW | IRP | MLW | BRI | 26th | 74 | |
| 2025 | MAN Motorsports | 95 | Toyota | FIF; 9 | CAR | NSV; 3 | FRS | DOV | IRP; 9 | IOW | BRI | 22nd | 111 | |
| 2026 | MAN Motorsports | 95 | Toyota | HCY | CAR | NSV; 4 | TOL | IRP; 12 | FRS | IOW | BRI; 32 | 28th | 84 | |

=== CARS Pro Late Model Tour ===
(key)

CARS Pro Late Model Tour results
| Year | Team | No. | Make | 1 | 2 | 3 | 4 | 5 | 6 | 7 | 8 | 9 | 10 | 11 | CPLMTC | Pts | Ref |
|---|---|---|---|---|---|---|---|---|---|---|---|---|---|---|---|---|---|
| 2026 | Day Enterprises | 29 | N/A | SNM | NSV; 19 | CRW | ACE | NWS | HCY | AND | FLC | TCM | NPS | SBO | 67th | 22 | |

=== ASA STARS National Tour ===
(key) (Bold – Pole position awarded by qualifying time. Italics – Pole position earned by points standings or practice time. * – Most laps led. ** – All laps led.)

ASA STARS National Tour results
| Year | Team | No. | Make | 1 | 2 | 3 | 4 | 5 | 6 | 7 | 8 | 9 | 10 | 11 | ASNTC | Pts | Ref |
|---|---|---|---|---|---|---|---|---|---|---|---|---|---|---|---|---|---|
| 2023 | Day Enterprises | 29 | Chevy | FIF | MAD | NWS | HCY | MLW | AND | WIR | TOL | WIN | NSV; 29 | | 81st | 35 | |
| 2024 | Day Enterprises | 29 | Chevy | NSM; 31 | FIF | HCY | MAD | MLW | AND | OWO | TOL | WIN | | | 52nd | 50 | |
| 2024 | Day Enterprises | 29W | Chevy | | | | | | | | | | NSV; 23 | | 52nd | 50 | |
| 2026 | Day Enterprises | 29 | Chevy | NSM; 32 | FIF | HCY | SLG | MAD | NPS | OWO | TRI | WIN | NSV | NSM | -* | -* | |
