= Matt Kemp (racing driver) =

American racing driver (born 1999)

- Born: January 25, 1999 (age 27); Sawyer, Michigan, U.S.

ARCA Menards Series career
- 25 races run over 4 years
- Best finish: 16th (2025)
- First race: 2023 Herr's Snacks 200 (Berlin)
- Last race: 2026 Spruce 212 (Salem)
Wins	Top tens	Poles
0	2	0

ARCA Menards Series East career
- 8 races run over 4 years
- Best finish: 30th (2026)
- First race: 2023 Calypso Lemonade 150 (Iowa)
- Last race: 2026 Sunbelt Rentals 150 (Flat Rock)
Wins	Top tens	Poles
0	3	0
- Statistics up to date as of September 12, 2026.

Matt Kemp (born January 25, 1999) is an American professional stock car racing driver. He last competed part-time in the ARCA Menards Series, driving the No. 19 Chevrolet for Maples Motorsports, and part-time in the ARCA Menards Series East, driving the No. 11 Ford for Fast Track Racing.

== Racing career ==
From 2014 to 2015, Kemp would make select starts in the Midwest Indoor Racing Series Arena-Mini Cup Division and the Vores Compact Touring Series in the North Division before making a lone start in the Great Lakes Super Mini Cup Series.

In 2019, Kemp would run full-time in the Midwest Classic Racers Series, driving the No. 1a entry, where he would win one race at South Bend Motor Speedway and would finish in the top-ten in all the races on the schedule on his way to finish third in the points standings. He would go on to finish second in the points and win six races between 2020 and 2021. In 2022, Kemp would win seven races and would once again finish in the top-ten in every race, and would go on to win the championship over Troy Hoffman by over fifty points.

In 2023, Kemp would make his debut in the ARCA Menards Series at Berlin Raceway, driving the No. 12 Ford for Fast Track Racing, where he would start twelfth and finish thirteenth due to issue with the rear end of the car. He would then make another start at Iowa Speedway, where he would also make his ARCA Menards Series East debut, as it was a combination event with the main ARCA series. He would start fifteenth but finish nineteenth after 29 laps due to mechanical issues. He then made another start at Kansas Speedway, this time driving the No. 11, where he finished twentieth due to vibrations in the car.

In 2024, it was announced that Kemp would return to the East Series at Flat Rock Speedway, once again driving for Fast Track Racing. He had previously tested with the team at the pre-season test at Daytona International Speedway, where he placed 47th in the overall results between the two testing days. He went on the finish in sixth place after starting in the same position. He also ran at Berlin Raceway in the main ARCA series, finishing in seventeenth due to mechanical issues, and the season ending race at Toledo Speedway for FTR, this time in the No. 01 Ford, where he finished in 21st after running only seven laps once again due to mechanical issues.

In 2025, Kemp made his superspeedway debut at Talladega Superspeedway, driving the No. 12 Ford for FTR, where he finished in 35th due to suspension issues. He made several starts between the main ARCA series and East series throughout the remainder of the year, getting a best finish of fourth at the East Series race at Flat Rock Speedway, a race where he started on the front row in second.

In April 2026, it was announced that Kemp would drive a partial schedule for Maples Motorsports, beginning at Kansas Speedway.

== Motorsports results ==
=== Stock car career summary ===
Season	Series	Team	Races	Wins	Top 5	Top 10	Points	Position
2023	ARCA Menards Series East	Fast Track Racing	1	0	0	0	25	51st
2023	ARCA Menards Series	Fast Track Racing	3	0	0	0	80	45th
2024	ARCA Menards Series East	Fast Track Racing	1	0	0	1	38	42nd
2024	ARCA Menards Series	Fast Track Racing	2	0	0	0	50	71st
2025	ARCA Menards Series East	Fast Track Racing	3	0	1	1	72	34th
2025	ARCA Menards Series	Fast Track Racing	13	0	0	1	265	16th
2026	ARCA Menards Series East	Fast Track Racing	2	0	0	0	80	30th
2026	ARCA Menards Series East	Maples Motorsports	1	0	1	1	80	30th
2026	ARCA Menards Series	Maples Motorsports	3	0	0	0	161	27th
2026	ARCA Menards Series	Fast Track Racing	3	0	0	1	161	27th
2026	ARCA Menards Series	ACR Motorsports	1	0	0	0	161	27th

=== ARCA Menards Series ===
(key) (Bold – Pole position awarded by qualifying time. Italics – Pole position earned by points standings or practice time. * – Most laps led.)

ARCA Menards Series results
Year	Team	No.	Make	1	2	3	4	5	6	7	8	9	10	11	12	13	14	15	16	17	18	19	20	AMSC	Pts	Ref
2023	Fast Track Racing	12	Ford	DAY	PHO	TAL	KAN	CLT	BLN; 13	ELK	MOH	IOW; 19	POC	MCH	IRP	GLN	ISF	MLW	DSF					45th	80	
2023	Fast Track Racing	11	Toyota																	KAN; 20	BRI	SLM	TOL	45th	80	
2024	Fast Track Racing	10	Toyota	DAY	PHO	TAL	DOV	KAN	CLT	IOW	MOH	BLN; 17	IRP	SLM	ELK	MCH	ISF	MLW	DSF	GLN	BRI	KAN		71st	50	
2024	Fast Track Racing	01	Ford																				TOL; 21	71st	50	
2025	Fast Track Racing	12	Ford	DAY	PHO	TAL; 35	KAN; 20	CLT; 29									ISF; 18	MAD; 22	DSF	BRI				16th	265	
2025	Fast Track Racing	9	Toyota						MCH; 25												SLM; 20	KAN; 29	TOL; 23	16th	265	
2025	Fast Track Racing	10	Ford							BLN; 9														16th	265	
2025	Fast Track Racing	9	Ford								ELK; 21	LRP												16th	265	
2025	Fast Track Racing	01	Toyota										DOV; 24	IRP; 32	IOW	GLN								16th	265	
2026	Maples Motorsports	19	Chevy	DAY	PHO	KAN; 14	TAL; 23	GLN						CHI; 26	LRP	IRP	IOW	ISF	MAD	DSF				27th	161	
2026	Fast Track Racing	11	Ford						TOL; 27			BER; 8	ELK											27th	161	
2026	Fast Track Racing	11	Chevy							MCH; 26	POC													27th	161	
2026	ACR Motorsports	79	Chevy																		SLM; 23	BRI	KAN	27th	161	

==== ARCA Menards Series East ====
ARCA Menards Series East results
Year	Team	No.	Make	1	2	3	4	5	6	7	8	AMSEC	Pts	Ref
2023	Fast Track Racing	12	Ford	FIF	DOV	NSV	FRS	IOW; 19	IRP	MLW	BRI	51st	25	
2024	Fast Track Racing	12	Toyota	FIF	DOV	NSV	FRS; 6	IOW	IRP	MLW	BRI	42nd	38	
2025	Fast Track Racing	10	Ford	FIF	CAR	NSV	FRS; 4					34th	72	
2025	Fast Track Racing	01	Toyota					DOV; 24	IRP; 32	IOW	BRI	34th	72	
2026	Fast Track Racing	11	Ford	HCY; 21	CAR	NSV	TOL; 27	IRP				30th	80	
2026	Maples Motorsports	91	Chevy						FRS; 4	IOW	BRI	30th	80	
