= Kevin Campbell (racing driver) =

American racing driver

- Born: July 18, 1966 (age 60); Shepherdsville, Kentucky, U.S.

ARCA Menards Series career
- 15 races run over 2 years
- Best finish: 26th (2026)
- First race: 2015 Troop Aid 200 (Nashville)
- Last race: 2026 Menards 150 (Kansas)
Wins	Top tens	Poles
0	0	0

ARCA Menards Series East career
- 2 races run over 1 year
- Best finish: 68th (2026)
- First race: 2026 LiUNA! 150 (IRP)
- Last race: 2026 JR & CO. 150 (Iowa)
Wins	Top tens	Poles
0	0	0
- Statistics up to date as of September 26, 2026.

Kevin Campbell (born July 18, 1966) is an American professional stock car racing driver. He last competed part-time in the ARCA Menards Series, driving the No. 81 Chevrolet for his own team, KC Motorsports.

== Racing career ==
In 2015, Campbell made his debut in the ARCA Racing Series at Nashville Fairgrounds Speedway, driving his own No. 81 Chevrolet, where he finished 24th due to a crash. He then made five more starts across the year, failing to finish in all of them. In 2018, he attempted to make a return to the series at the DuQuoin State Fairgrounds dirt track, but withdrew from the event.

In 2023, Campbell participated in the preseason test for the now ARCA Menards Series at Daytona International Speedway, driving the No. 82 Chevrolet for his own team, where he set the 61st and slowest time across the two sessions. He was originally scheduled to attempt to qualify for the season opening race at the track one month later with sponsorship from the University of Missouri and the Mizzou Tigers, but withdrew before practice.

== Motorsports results ==
=== Stock car career summary ===
Season	Series	Team	Races	Wins	Top 5	Top 10	Points	Position
2015	ARCA Racing Series	KC Motorsports	6	0	0	0	395	60th
2018	ARCA Racing Series	KC Motorsports	0	0	0	0	0	N/A
2023	ARCA Menards Series	KC Motorsports	0	0	0	0	0	N/A
2026	ARCA Menards Series East	KC Motorsports	2	0	0	0	15	68th
2026	ARCA Menards Series	KC Motorsports	9	0	0	0	170	26th

=== ARCA Menards Series ===
(key) (Bold – Pole position awarded by qualifying time. Italics – Pole position earned by points standings or practice time. * – Most laps led. ** – All laps led.)

ARCA Menards Series results
Year	Team	No.	Make	1	2	3	4	5	6	7	8	9	10	11	12	13	14	15	16	17	18	19	20	AMSC	Pts	Ref
2015	KC Motorsports	81	Chevy	DAY	MOB	NSH; 24	SLM	TAL	TOL	NJE	POC	MCH	CHI	WIN		IRP; 33	POC	BLN	ISF; 32	DSF; 32	SLM; 33	KEN	KAN	60th	395	
2015	KC Motorsports	40	Chevy												IOW; 30									60th	395	
2018	KC Motorsports	81	Chevy	DAY	NSH	SLM	TAL	TOL	CLT	POC	MCH	MAD	GTW	CHI	IOW	ELK	POC	ISF	BLN	DSF; Wth	SLM	IRP	KAN	N/A	0	
2023	KC Motorsports	82	Chevy	DAY; Wth	PHO	TAL; Wth	KAN	CLT	BLN	ELK	MOH	IOW	POC	MCH	IRP	GLN	ISF	MLW	DSF	KAN	BRI	SLM	TOL	N/A	0	
2026	KC Motorsports	81	Chevy	DAY	PHO	KAN; Wth	TAL	GLN	TOL; Wth	MCH	POC	BER; 22	ELK; 21	CHI	LRP	IRP; 34	IOW; 32	ISF; 23	MAD; 20	DSF; 24	SLM; 21	BRI	KAN; 22	26th	170	

==== ARCA Menards Series East ====
ARCA Menards Series East results
Year	Team	No.	Make	1	2	3	4	5	6	7	8	AMSEC	Pts	Ref
2026	KC Motorsports	81	Chevy	HCY	CAR	NSV	TOL; Wth	IRP; 34	FRS	IOW; 32	BRI	68th	15	
