= Landon S. Huffman =

American racing driver (born 2006)

- Born: Landon Shane Huffman; November 12, 2006 (age 20); Connelly Springs, North Carolina, U.S.

NASCAR O'Reilly Auto Parts Series career
- Best finish: 2026
- First race: 97th (2026)
Wins	Top tens	Poles
0	0	0

ARCA Menards Series career
- 4 races run over 1 year
- Best finish: 34th (2026)
- First race: 2026 Shore Lunch 250 (Elko)
- Last race: 2026 Menards 150 (Kansas)
Wins	Top tens	Poles
0	2	0

ARCA Menards Series East career
- 2 races run over 1 year
- Best finish: 29th (2026)
- First race: 2026 Cook Out 200 (Hickory)
- Last race: 2026 Cook Out Music City 150 (Nashville Fairgrounds)
Wins	Top tens	Poles
0	2	0
- Statistics up to date as of November 7, 2026.

Landon Shane Huffman (born November 12, 2006) is an American professional stock car racing driver. He last competed part-time in the NASCAR O'Reilly Auto Parts Series, driving the No. 43 Chevrolet Camaro SS for SPS Racing, part-time in ARCA Menards Series and ARCA Menards Series East, driving for the No. 28 Chevrolet for Chevrolet for Pinnacle Racing Group, and the No. 9/97 Chevrolet for CR7 Motorsports, and part-time in the zMAX CARS Tour, driving the No. 77 Chevrolet for LSH Racing.

Huffman is the son of former racing driver and crew chief Shane Huffman.

== Racing career ==
Huffman has competed in series such as the Virginia Late Model Triple Crown Series, the Carolina Pro Late Model Series, the I-95 Showdown Series, and the NASCAR Weekly Series.

=== ARCA Menards Series ===
In 2026, it was revealed that Huffman would participate in the pre-season test for the ARCA Menards Series at Daytona International Speedway, driving the No. 82 Chevrolet for Pinnacle Racing Group, where he set the 28th quickest time between the two sessions held. On March 12, it was announced that Huffman will run a partial ARCA schedule with CR7 Motorsports.

=== NASCAR O'Reilly Auto Parts Series ===
On September 9, 2026, it was announced that Huffman would drive the No. 43 at Bristol for SPS Racing in their debut. Unfortunately, due to a rainout, qualifying was canceled and because this was the team's debut and having no owner's points initially, Huffman and the team would fail to qualify for the race.

== Personal life ==
Huffman is the son of former NASCAR driver and current crew chief and team executive (for ARCA Menards Series team Pinnacle Racing Group) Shane Huffman.

When he has competed in the CARS Tour, Huffman has competed against another Landon Huffman. Although they are both from North Carolina and both are sons of unrelated former NASCAR drivers Robert and Shane, they are not the same person. Throughout his time in the series, this Landon Huffman has often been designated on entry lists and race results as "Landon S. Huffman" to avoid confusion with the other Landon Huffman.

== Motorsports career results ==
=== Stock car career summary ===
Season	Series	Team	Races	Wins	Top 5	Top 10	Points	Position
2022	CARS Pro Late Model Tour	LSH Racing	1	0	0	1	23	47th
2024	CARS Late Model Stock Car Tour	Pinnacle Racing Group	4	0	1	1	0	N/A
2025	CARS Late Model Stock Car Tour	Pinnacle Racing Group	7	0	1	1	258	18th
2025	CARS Late Model Stock Car Tour	Houser Brothers Racing	1	0	1	1	258	18th
2026	CARS Late Model Stock Car Tour	LSH Racing	9	0	0	2	238	15th
2026	ARCA Menards Series East	CR7 Motorsports	2	0	1	2	81	29th
2026	ARCA Menards Series	Pinnacle Racing Group	1	0	0	0	138	34th
2026	ARCA Menards Series	CR7 Motorsports	3	0	2	2	138	34th
2026	NASCAR O'Reilly Auto Parts Series	SPS Racing	0	0	0	0	0	97th

=== NASCAR ===
(key) (Bold – Pole position awarded by qualifying time. Italics – Pole position earned by points standings or practice time. * – Most laps led.)

==== O'Reilly Auto Parts Series ====
NASCAR O'Reilly Auto Parts Series results
Year	Team	No.	Make	1	2	3	4	5	6	7	8	9	10	11	12	13	14	15	16	17	18	19	20	21	22	23	24	25	26	27	28	29	30	31	32	33	NOAPSC	Pts	Ref
2026	SPS Racing	43	Chevy	DAY	ATL	COA	PHO	LVS	DAR	MAR	CAR	BRI	KAN	TAL	TEX	GLN	DOV	CLT	NSH	POC	COR	SON	CHI	ATL	IND	IOW	DAY	DAR	GTW	BRI; DNQ	LVS	CLT	PHO	TAL	MAR	HOM	97th	0^{1}	

=== ARCA Menards Series ===
(key) (Bold – Pole position awarded by qualifying time. Italics – Pole position earned by points standings or practice time. * – Most laps led. ** – All laps led.)

ARCA Menards Series results
Year	Team	No.	Make	1	2	3	4	5	6	7	8	9	10	11	12	13	14	15	16	17	18	19	20	AMSC	Pts	Ref
2026	Pinnacle Racing Group	28	Chevy	DAY	PHO	KAN	TAL	GLN	TOL	MCH	POC	BER	ELK; 14*											34th	138	
2026	CR7 Motorsports	9	Chevy											CHI; 3	LRP	IRP	IOW	ISF	MAD	DSF			KAN; 20	34th	138	
2026	CR7 Motorsports	97	Chevy																		SLM; 4	BRI		34th	138	

==== ARCA Menards Series East ====
ARCA Menards Series East results
Year	Team	No.	Make	1	2	3	4	5	6	7	8	AMSEC	Pts	Ref
2026	CR7 Motorsports	9	Chevy	HCY; 6	CAR	NSV; 2	TOL	IRP	FRS	IOW	BRI	29th	81	

=== CARS Late Model Stock Car Tour ===
(key) (Bold – Pole position awarded by qualifying time. Italics – Pole position earned by points standings or practice time. * – Most laps led. ** – All laps led.)

CARS Late Model Stock Car Tour results
Year	Team	No.	Make	1	2	3	4	5	6	7	8	9	10	11	12	13	14	15	16	17	CLMSCTC	Pts	Ref
2024	Pinnacle Racing Group	28	Chevy	SNM	HCY	AAS	OCS	ACE	TCM	LGY	DOM	CRW	HCY	NWS	ACE	WCS	FLC; 28	SBO; 11	TCM; 4	NWS; 27	N/A	0	
2025	Pinnacle Racing Group	28	Chevy	AAS; DNQ	WCS; 18	CDL; 25	OCS; 11	ACE; 15	NWS; 33	LGY	DOM	CRW				SBO; 13		**NWS**; 2*			18th	258	
2025	Pinnacle Racing Group	84	Chevy										HCY; 12	AND	FLC						18th	258	
2025	Houser Brothers Racing	11	Chevy														TCM; 2				18th	258	
2026	LSH Racing	77H	Chevy	SNM; 8	WCS	NSV; 29	CRW; 12	ACE; 14	LGY; 21	DOM	NWS; 15			FLC; 22	TCM	NPS	SBO; 6				15th	238	
2026	LSH Racing	84	Ford									HCY; 13	AND								15th	238	

=== CARS Pro Late Model Tour ===
(key)

CARS Pro Late Model Tour results
Year	Team	No.	Make	1	2	3	4	5	6	7	8	9	10	11	12	CPLMTC	Pts	Ref
2022	LSH Racing	77H	Chevy	CRW	HCY	GPS	FCS	TCM; 10	HCY	ACE	MMS	TCM	ACE	SBO	CRW	47th	23	
