= Dustin Hillenburg =

American racing driver (born 2001)

- Born: May 11, 2001 (age 25); Concord, North Carolina, U.S.

ARCA Menards Series career
- 5 races run over 2 years
- Best finish: 51st (2026)
- First race: 2025 Badger 200 (Madison)
- Last race: 2026 Ashley Furniture 150 (Chicagoland)
Wins	Top tens	Poles
0	0	0

ARCA Menards Series East career
- 3 races run over 1 year
- Best finish: 32nd (2026)
- First race: 2026 Cook Out 200 (Hickory)
- Last race: 2026 Cook Out Music City 150 (Nashville Fairgrounds)
Wins	Top tens	Poles
0	0	0

ARCA Menards Series West career
- 2 races run over 2 years
- Best finish: 69th (2025)
- First race: 2025 Star Nursery 150 (Las Vegas Bullring)
- Last race: 2026 General Tire 150 (Phoenix)
Wins	Top tens	Poles
0	0	0
- Statistics up to date as of September 26, 2026.

Dustin Hillenburg (born May 11, 2001) is an American professional stock car racing driver and team owner. He last competed part-time in the ARCA Menards Series, driving the No. 10/11 Ford/Toyota for Fast Track Racing. He is the son of former racing driver Andy Hillenburg, who is the owner of FTR.

== Racing career ==
In 2025, it was revealed that Hillenburg would make his debut in the ARCA Menards Series at Madison International Speedway, driving the No. 11 Toyota for Fast Track Racing. where after placing sixteenth in practice, he qualified in nineteenth, and finished in sixteenth. Later that year, it was revealed that Hillenburg would make his debut in the ARCA Menards Series West at the Las Vegas Motor Speedway Bullring, this time driving the No. 12 Toyota for FTR.

In 2026, it was revealed that Hillenburg would participate in the pre-season test for the ARCA Menards Series at Daytona International Speedway, driving for FTR, where he set the 62nd quickest time between the two sessions held.

== Motorsports results ==
=== Stock car career summary ===
Season	Series	Team	Races	Wins	Top 5	Top 10	Points	Position
2025	ARCA Menards Series West	Fast Track Racing	1	0	0	0	26	69th
2025	ARCA Menards Series	Fast Track Racing	1	0	0	0	28	114th
2026	ARCA Menards Series West	Fast Track Racing	1	0	0	0	17	84th
2026	ARCA Menards Series West	Fierce Creature Racing	0	0	0	0	17	84th
2026	ARCA Menards Series East	Fast Track Racing	3	0	0	0	75	32nd
2026	ARCA Menards Series	Fast Track Racing	4	0	0	0	85	51st

=== ARCA Menards Series ===
(key) (Bold – Pole position awarded by qualifying time. Italics – Pole position earned by points standings or practice time. * – Most laps led.)

ARCA Menards Series results
Year	Team	No.	Make	1	2	3	4	5	6	7	8	9	10	11	12	13	14	15	16	17	18	19	20	AMSC	Pts	Ref
2025	Fast Track Racing	11	Toyota	DAY	PHO	TAL	KAN	CLT	MCH	BLN	ELK	LRP	DOV	IRP	IOW	GLN	ISF	MAD; 16	DSF	BRI	SLM	KAN	TOL	114th	28	
2026	Fast Track Racing	11	Toyota	DAY	PHO; 27	KAN	TAL	GLN	TOL															51st	85	
2026	Fast Track Racing	10	Ford							MCH; 27														51st	85	
2026	Fast Track Racing	11	Ford								POC; 20	BER	ELK											51st	85	
2026	Fast Track Racing	10	Chevy											CHI; 17	LRP	IRP	IOW	ISF	MAD	DSF	SLM	BRI	KAN	51st	85	

==== ARCA Menards Series East ====
ARCA Menards Series East results
Year	Team	No.	Make	1	2	3	4	5	6	7	8	AMSEC	Pts	Ref
2026	Fast Track Racing	12	Ford	HCY; 22	CAR; 15	NSV; 20	TOL	IRP	FRS	IOW	BRI	32nd	75	

==== ARCA Menards Series West ====
ARCA Menards Series West results
Year	Team	No.	Make	1	2	3	4	5	6	7	8	9	10	11	12	13	AMSWC	Pts	Ref
2025	Fast Track Racing	12	Toyota	KER	PHO	TUC	CNS	KER	SON	TRI	PIR	AAS	MAD	LVS; 18	PHO		69th	26	
2026	Fast Track Racing	11	Toyota	KER	PHO; 27	TUC	SHA	CNS	TRI	SON							84th	17	
2026	Fierce Creature Racing	27	Chevy								PIR; Wth	AAS	MAD	LVS	PHO	KER	84th	17	
