= 2026 ARCA Menards Series East =

40th season of the ARCA Menards Series East

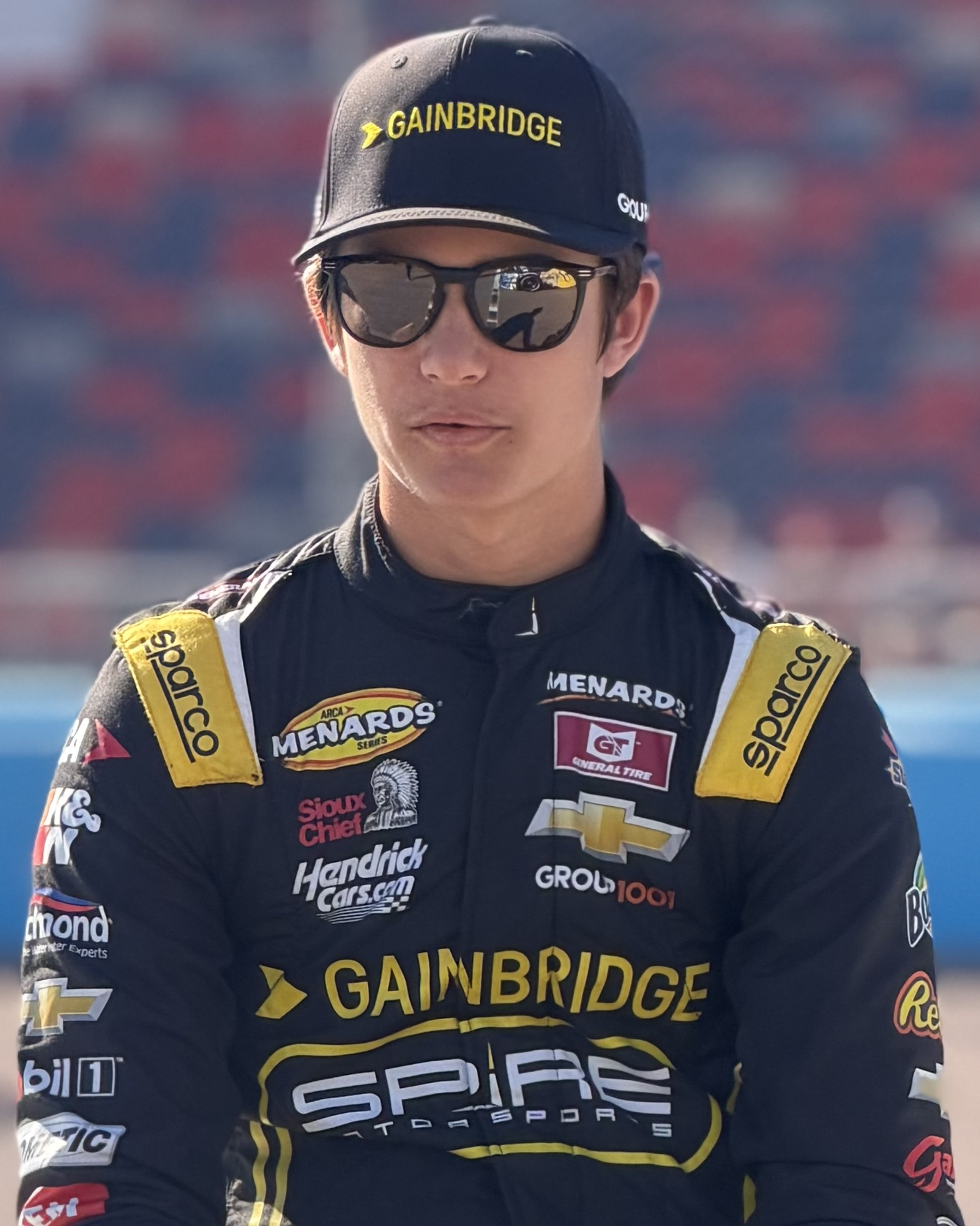
Tristan McKee, the 2026 ARCA Menards Series East champion.

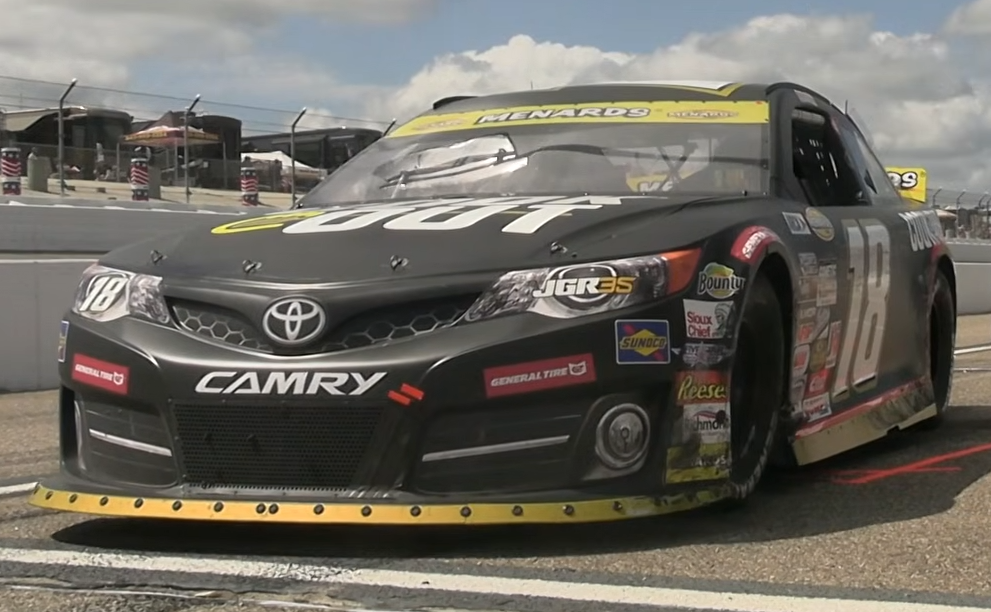
Max Reaves (not pictured), finished second in the drivers' championship.

The 2026 ARCA Menards Series East was the 40th season of the ARCA Menards Series East, a regional stock car racing series sanctioned by NASCAR in the United States. The season began on March 28 with the Cook Out 200 at Hickory Motor Speedway and ended on September 17 with the Bush's Best 200 at Bristol Motor Speedway.

Isaac Kitzmiller entered the season as the defending champion.

At the season's end, Tristan McKee, driving for Pinnacle Racing Group, won the drivers championship.

== Teams and drivers ==
=== Complete schedule ===
Manufacturer	Team	No.	Driver	Crew chief	Ref
Chevrolet	ACR Motorsports (Note: Entries are fielded in a collaboration with CR7 Motorsports.)	79	Isaac Kitzmiller	Doug Howe 7 Frank Kimmel 1	
Chevrolet	Maples Motorsports	99	Michael Maples	Chris Vanscoy	
Chevrolet	Pinnacle Racing Group	28	Derek Kneeland 1	Steven Dawson	
Chevrolet	Pinnacle Racing Group	28	Carson Brown (R) 7	Steven Dawson	
Chevrolet	Pinnacle Racing Group	77	Tristan McKee (R)	Kevin Reed Jr.	
Ford	City Garage Motorsports	85	Quinn Davis (R)	Ryan Bell	
Toyota	Integrity Autosports	13	Brian Weber 4	John Sutton 3 Joe McDonald 1 Brian Weber 2 Rita Goulet 1 Corrie Stott 1	
Toyota	Integrity Autosports	13	Rita Goulet 4	John Sutton 3 Joe McDonald 1 Brian Weber 2 Rita Goulet 1 Corrie Stott 1	
Toyota	Joe Gibbs Racing	18	Max Reaves (R)	Matt Ross	
Toyota	MAN Motorsports	95	Jackson McLerran 5 (Note: Jackson McLerran ran the full season split between the No. 06/95/96 cars for MAN Motorsports.)	David Noble 4 Mark Noble 1 John Burns 2 Hunter Wright 1	
Toyota	MAN Motorsports	95	Hunter Wright 3	David Noble 4 Mark Noble 1 John Burns 2 Hunter Wright 1	
Toyota	WAV Racing	34	Brian Barbarow 4	Brad Elter	
Toyota	WAV Racing	34	T. J. Harris 1	Brad Elter	
Toyota	WAV Racing	34	Ivis Earley 3	Brad Elter	
Toyota	Wayne Peterson Motorsports 7 MAN Motorsports 1 (Note: Entries are fielded in a collaboration with MAN Motorsports.)	06	Nate Moeller 5 (Note: Nate Moeller ran the full season split between the No. 0/06 cars for Wayne Peterson Racing.)	Unknown 1 Wayne Peterson 2 Michael Peterson 1 Nate Moeller 3 David Noble 1	
Toyota	Wayne Peterson Motorsports 7 MAN Motorsports 1	06	Jackson McLerran 1	Unknown 1 Wayne Peterson 2 Michael Peterson 1 Nate Moeller 3 David Noble 1	
Toyota	Wayne Peterson Motorsports 7 MAN Motorsports 1	06	Ben Peterson 1	Unknown 1 Wayne Peterson 2 Michael Peterson 1 Nate Moeller 3 David Noble 1	
Toyota	Wayne Peterson Motorsports 7 MAN Motorsports 1	06	Con Nicolopoulos 1	Unknown 1 Wayne Peterson 2 Michael Peterson 1 Nate Moeller 3 David Noble 1	
Toyota 7 TBA 1	Fast Track Racing	10	Craig Pellegrini Jr. (R)	Mike Sroufe	
Ford 7 Toyota 1	Fast Track Racing	11	Matt Kemp 2	Unknown 1 Andrew Kierman 2 Joseth Carabantes 2 Dick Doheny 3	
Ford 7 Toyota 1	Fast Track Racing	11	Mike Basham 1	Unknown 1 Andrew Kierman 2 Joseth Carabantes 2 Dick Doheny 3	
Ford 7 Toyota 1	Fast Track Racing	11	Chase Buscaglia 4	Unknown 1 Andrew Kierman 2 Joseth Carabantes 2 Dick Doheny 3	
Ford 7 Toyota 1	Fast Track Racing	11	Blaine Donahue 1	Unknown 1 Andrew Kierman 2 Joseth Carabantes 2 Dick Doheny 3	
Ford 3 Toyota 5	Fast Track Racing	12	Dustin Hillenburg 3	Andrew Kierman 5 Joseth Carabantes 3	
Ford 3 Toyota 5	Fast Track Racing	12	Takuma Koga 4	Andrew Kierman 5 Joseth Carabantes 3	
Ford 3 Toyota 5	Fast Track Racing	12	Dan Boys 1	Andrew Kierman 5 Joseth Carabantes 3	
Ford 7 Chevrolet 1	Maples Motorsports (Note: Entries are fielded in a collaboration with WAV Racing.)	19	Austin Vaughn 7 (Note: Austin Vaughn ran the full season split between the No. 19/91 cars for Maples Motorsports.)	Kyle Totman 5 John Szulczewski 2 Kenna Long 1	
Ford 7 Chevrolet 1	Maples Motorsports	19	Brad Perez 1	Kyle Totman 5 John Szulczewski 2 Kenna Long 1	

=== Limited schedule ===
Manufacturer	Team	No.	Driver	Crew chief	Races	Ref
Chevrolet	Andrew Patterson Racing	40	Andrew Patterson	Patrick Torbett	2	
Chevrolet	Brother-In-Law Racing	57	Hunter Deshautelle	Bob Rahilly	1	
Chevrolet	CCM Racing	7	Kadence Davenport	Eric Caudell	1	
Chevrolet	Cook Racing Technologies	42	Taylor Mayhew	Alexis Penninger	1	
Chevrolet	CR7 Motorsports	9	Landon S. Huffman	Frank Kimmel	2	
Chevrolet	CR7 Motorsports	97	Jason Kitzmiller	Frank Kimmel	4	
Chevrolet	Jet Daddy Racing	00	Toby Blanton	John Kennedy 2 Oceana Tiner 2	4	
Chevrolet	KC Motorsports	81	Kevin Campbell	Mason Campbell	3	
Chevrolet	Maples Motorsports	1	Kenna Long	Colin Flueckiger	1	
Chevrolet	Phoenix Racing	1	Jake Finch	Johnny Allen	1	
Chevrolet	Rise Racing with Earnhardt-Shearer Racing	89	Bobby Dale Earnhardt	Matthew Wright 2 Jacob Petrowsky 2	3	
Chevrolet	Rise Racing with Earnhardt-Shearer Racing	89	Brayton Laster	Matthew Wright 2 Jacob Petrowsky 2	1	
Chevrolet	SPS Racing	24	Connor Hall	Blake Bainbridge	2	
Chevrolet	SPS Racing	24	Caden Kvapil	Blake Bainbridge	1	
Ford	Brad Smith Motorsports	48	Brad Smith	Terry Strange 1 Brian Pacheco 1 Jeff Smith 1 Dan Walten 1 James Jacobson 1	5	
Ford	City Garage Motorsports	5	Michael Clayton	Stuart Weiss	2	
Ford	Clubb Racing Inc.	03	Alex Clubb	Jon Clubb 1 Brian Clubb 5	5	
Ford	Clubb Racing Inc.	03	Jeff Maconi	Jon Clubb 1 Brian Clubb 5	1	
Ford	Clubb Racing Inc.	83	Brayton Laster	Chris Porter	1	
Ford	Clubb Racing Inc.	86	Alex Clubb	Brian Clubb 1 Jon Clubb 3 Chris Porter 2	1	
Ford	Clubb Racing Inc.	86	Jeff Maconi	Brian Clubb 1 Jon Clubb 3 Chris Porter 2	4	
Ford	Clubb Racing Inc.	86	Alex Malycke	Brian Clubb 1 Jon Clubb 3 Chris Porter 2	1	
Ford	Kimmel Racing	69	Landon Brown	Bill Kimmel	2	
Ford	Mullins Racing	3	Bryce Applegate	Bryan Frazier	1	
Ford	Rette Jones Racing	0	George Siciliano	Mark Rette 1 Logan Yiengst 1	2	
Ford	Rette Jones Racing	30	Garrett Mitchell	Mark Rette	1	
Ford	Tim Monroe Racing	14	Tim Monroe	Tim Monroe	1	
Toyota	Fast Track Racing	01	Tony Musolino	Jeremy Petty	1	
Toyota	MacZink Racing	65	Jeffery MacZink	Jarod MacZink	1	
Toyota	MAN Motorsports	96	Jackson McLerran	David Noble	2	
Toyota	MCM Racing Development	38	Esteban Rodríguez	Max Calles	4	
Toyota	MCM Racing Development	38	Gabriel Casagrande	Max Calles	1	
Toyota	Nitro Motorsports	15	Ashton Higgins	Doug Richert	1	
Toyota	Nitro Motorsports	15	Jade Avedisian	Doug Richert	2	
Toyota	Nitro Motorsports	20	Jake Bollman	Doug George	4	
Toyota	Nitro Motorsports	25	Gavan Boschele	Shane Wilson	4	
Toyota	Nitro Motorsports	25	Wesley Slimp	Shane Wilson	1	
Toyota	Nitro Motorsports	55	Isabella Robusto	Glenn Parker	4	
Toyota	Nitro Motorsports	70	Nick Tucker	Shannon Rursch 5 Glenn Parker 1	1	
Toyota	Nitro Motorsports	70	Wesley Slimp	Shannon Rursch 5 Glenn Parker 1	1	
Toyota	Nitro Motorsports	70	Thomas Annunziata	Shannon Rursch 5 Glenn Parker 1	4	
Toyota	Nitro Motorsports	90	Ty Fredrickson (Note: Entries were fielded in collaboration with Team 36.)	George Church	1	
Toyota	Ryan Huff Motorsports	36	Ryan Huff	James Huff	1	
Toyota	Shearer Speed Racing	98	Dale Shearer	Jeremy Petty	2	
Toyota	Team 36	36	Ty Fredrickson	Dan Fredrickson	1	
Toyota	Tim Richmond Racing	27	Tim Richmond	Adam Murphy	1	
Toyota	Tinkle Family Racing	53	Zachary Tinkle	Adam Murphy	2	
Chevrolet 1 Toyota 2	Cook Racing Technologies	17	Cory Roper	Sean Samuels	1	
Chevrolet 1 Toyota 2	Cook Racing Technologies	17	Kaden Honeycutt	Sean Samuels	2	
Chevrolet 2 Toyota 1	KLAS Motorsports	71	Andy Jankowiak	Mike Dayton	3	
Chevrolet 2 Ford 3	Maples Motorsports	91	Ryan Vargas	Kyle Totman 4 Kenna Long 1	3 (Note: Originally Vargas was scheduled to drive the No. 91 and Michael Maples was scheduled to drive the No. 99 at IRP (Race 5), however after No. 99 blew the engine in practice, Maples replaced Vargas in No. 91 in the race.)	
Chevrolet 2 Ford 3	Maples Motorsports	91	Michael Maples	Kyle Totman 4 Kenna Long 1	1	
Chevrolet 2 Ford 3	Maples Motorsports	91	Matt Kemp	Kyle Totman 4 Kenna Long 1	1	
Chevrolet 2 Ford 3	Maples Motorsports	91	Austin Vaughn	Kyle Totman 4 Kenna Long 1	1	
Chevrolet 2 Toyota 1	MBM Motorsports	66	Dystany Spurlock	Jason Miller	3	
Toyota 2 Chevrolet 2	Wayne Peterson Motorsports	0	Brayton Laster	Nate Moeller 1 Wayne Peterson 1 Michael Peterson 1	1	
Toyota 2 Chevrolet 2	Wayne Peterson Motorsports	0	Nate Moeller	Nate Moeller 1 Wayne Peterson 1 Michael Peterson 1	3	

== Schedule ==
The full schedule was announced on December 9, 2025. Some race dates were announced before then as part of the announcement of the main ARCA Series schedule on October 4.

Note: Races highlighted in gold are combination events with the ARCA Menards Series.

No	Race title	Track	Location	Date
1	Cook Out 200	Hickory Motor Speedway	Hickory, North Carolina	March 28
2	Rockingham ARCA Menards Series East 125	Rockingham Speedway	Rockingham, North Carolina	April 4
3	Cook Out Music City 150	Nashville Fairgrounds Speedway	Nashville, Tennessee	May 2
4	Owens Corning 200	Toledo Speedway	Toledo, Ohio	May 16
5	LiUNA! 150*	Lucas Oil Indianapolis Raceway Park	Brownsburg, Indiana	July 24
6	Sunbelt Rentals 150	Flat Rock Speedway	Ash Township, Michigan	August 1
7	JR & CO. 150*	Iowa Speedway	Newton, Iowa	August 7
8	Bush's Best 200*	Bristol Motor Speedway	Bristol, Tennessee	September 17

=== Schedule changes ===
- Hickory Motor Speedway was added to the schedule.
- Toledo Speedway returns to the schedule for the first time since 2020.
- Five Flags Speedway and Dover Motor Speedway were removed from the schedule.

== Results and standings ==
=== Race results ===
No.	Race	Pole position	Most laps led	Winning driver	Manufacturer	No.	Winning team	Report
1	Cook Out 200	Max Reaves	Max Reaves	Tristan McKee	Chevrolet	77	Pinnacle Racing Group	Report
2	Rockingham ARCA Menards Series East 125	Tristan McKee	Tristan McKee	Tristan McKee	Chevrolet	77	Pinnacle Racing Group	Report
3	Cook Out Music City 150	Max Reaves	Max Reaves	Max Reaves	Toyota	18	Joe Gibbs Racing	Report
4	Owens Corning 200	Max Reaves	Tristan McKee	Tristan McKee	Chevrolet	77	Pinnacle Racing Group	Report
5	LiUNA! 150 presented by IDEAL Garage Door	Carson Brown	Carson Brown	Kaden Honeycutt	Toyota	17	Cook Racing Technologies	Report
6	Sunbelt Rentals 150	Carson Brown	Max Reaves	Max Reaves	Toyota	18	Joe Gibbs Racing	Report
7	JR & CO. 150	Tristan McKee	Tristan McKee	Tristan McKee	Chevrolet	77	Pinnacle Racing Group	Report
8	Bush's Best 200	Carson Brown	Carson Brown	Carson Brown	Chevrolet	28	Pinnacle Racing Group	Report

=== Drivers' championship ===
Notes:

- The pole winner also receives one bonus point, similar to the previous ARCA points system used until 2019 and unlike NASCAR.
- Additionally, after groups of five races of the season, drivers that compete in all five races receive fifty additional points. This points bonus will be given after the race at Indianapolis.
  - Max Reaves, Tristan McKee, Isaac Kitzmiller, Craig Pellegrini Jr., Jackson McLerran, Austin Vaughn, Quinn Davis, Nate Moeller, and Michael Maples received this points bonus for having competed in the first five races of the season (Hickory, Rockingham, Nashville Fairgrounds, Toledo, and Indianapolis). McKee, Reaves, Kitzmiller, Pellegrini, McLerran, Carson Brown, Vaughn, Davis, Moeller, Maples, and Alex Clubb received this points bonus for having competed in the final three races of the season (Flat Rock, Iowa, and Bristol).

(key) Bold – Pole position awarded by time. Italics – Pole position set by final practice results or rainout. * – Most laps led.

Pos	Driver	HCY	CAR	NSV	TOL	IRP	FRS	IOW	BRI	Points
1	Tristan McKee **(R)**	1	**1****	3	1*	32	2	**1***	2	431
2	Max Reaves **(R)**	**2***	8	**1****	**11**	9	1*	4	4	428
3	Isaac Kitzmiller	3	3	5	13	5	3	5	5	411
4	Craig Pellegrini Jr. **(R)**	9	10	6	10	17	9	14	17	360
5	Jackson McLerran	8	6	8	25	15	8	28	16	338
6	Carson Brown **(R)**		2	9	3	**3***	**18**	2	**1****	332
7	Austin Vaughn	10	14	14	24	14	7	19	18	332
8	Quinn Davis **(R)**	16	21	16	12	11	5	15	25	331
9	Nate Moeller	14	16	12	16	25	14	30	35	290
10	Michael Maples	17	19	18	26	29	21	20	26	226
11	Alex Clubb			22	14	20	13	22	21	202
12	Thomas Annunziata				2	2		7	9	156
13	Jake Bollman				4	7		3	6	156
14	Esteban Rodríguez	11		7			6	13		139
15	Gavan Boschele		20			4		6	13	133
16	Jason Kitzmiller				7	16		25	11	117
17	Jeff Maconi			19	18	21		24	23	115
18	Isabella Robusto				6	30		11	20	109
19	Brian Weber	20	11					17	19	109
20	Brian Barbarow	18			19		11	21		107
21	Toby Blanton	19	18	15			17			107
22	Rita Goulet			13	22	22	15			104
23	Dystany Spurlock	7	12			13				100
24	Chase Buscaglia			11		23		23	22	97
25	Andy Jankowiak				21			8	8	95
26	Kaden Honeycutt					1			3	88
27	Takuma Koga				20	19		27	24	86
28	Hunter Wright			4		12			32	84
29	Landon S. Huffman	6		2						81
30	Matt Kemp	21			27		4			80
31	Wesley Slimp		5		8					75
32	Dustin Hillenburg	22	15	20						75
33	Brad Smith	Wth	Wth		17	24	Wth	29	31	75
34	Ryan Vargas				9	PR		9		73
35	Jade Avedisian							10	7	71
36	Andrew Patterson					6			12	70
37	Bobby Dale Earnhardt				15			16	33	68
38	Ivis Earley			10		28			27	67
39	George Siciliano	13	9							66
40	Ty Fredrickson							12	14	62
41	Connor Hall	15	17							56
42	Landon Brown			17		18				53
43	Brayton Laster			21		27		31		53
44	Zachary Tinkle					10			30	48
45	Derek Kneeland	4								40
46	Garrett Mitchell		4							40
47	Nick Tucker	5								39
48	Caden Kvapil				5					39
49	Dale Shearer				23	26				39
50	Cory Roper		7							37
51	Ashton Higgins					8				36
52	Michael Clayton					33	20			35
53	Blaine Donahue						10			34
54	Taylor Mayhew								10	34
55	Hunter Deshautelle	12								32
56	Jeffery MacZink						12			32
57	T. J. Harris		13							31
58	Gabriel Casagrande								15	29
59	Alex Malycke						16			28
60	Tony Musolino							18		26
61	Dan Boys						19			25
62	Mike Basham		22							22
63	Tim Monroe	23								21
64	Ben Peterson							26		18
65	Kenna Long				28					16
66	Jake Finch								28	16
67	Con Nicolopoulos								29	15
68	Kevin Campbell				Wth	34		32		15
69	Bryce Applegate					31				13
70	Kadence Davenport							33		11
71	Brad Perez								34	10
	Ryan Huff		Wth							
	Brian Clubb			Wth						
	Marty McLendon			Wth						

== See also ==
- 2026 NASCAR Cup Series
- 2026 NASCAR O'Reilly Auto Parts Series
- 2026 NASCAR Craftsman Truck Series
- 2026 ARCA Menards Series
- 2026 ARCA Menards Series West
- 2026 NASCAR Whelen Modified Tour
- 2026 NASCAR Euro Series
- 2026 NASCAR Canada Series
- 2026 NASCAR Brasil Series
- 2026 CARS Tour
- 2026 SMART Modified Tour
- 2026 ASA STARS National Tour
