= Jeff Maconi =

American racing driver (born 1998)

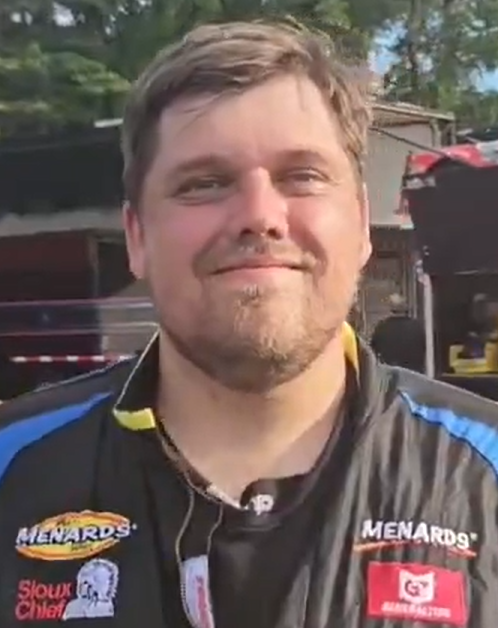
- Maconi at Lime Rock Park in 2026
- Born: August 29, 1998 (age 28); Wilbraham, Massachusetts, U.S.

ARCA Menards Series career
- 24 races run over 2 years
- ARCA no., team: No. 86 (Clubb Racing Inc.)
- Best finish: 10th (2026)
- First race: 2025 Henry Ford Health 200 (Michigan)
- Last race: 2026 Menards 150 (Kansas)
Wins	Top tens	Poles
0	0	0

ARCA Menards Series East career
- 6 races run over 2 years
- Best finish: 17th (2026)
- First race: 2025 Music City 150 (Nashville Fairgrounds)
- Last race: 2026 Bush's Best 200 (Bristol)
Wins	Top tens	Poles
0	0	0

ARCA Menards Series West career
- 1 race run over 1 year
- Best finish: 90th (2026)
- First race: 2026 General Tire 150 (Phoenix)
Wins	Top tens	Poles
0	0	0
- Statistics up to date as of November 2, 2026.

Jeffrey Maconi (born August 29, 1998) is an American professional stock car racing driver. He competes part-time in the ARCA Menards Series, driving the No. 86 Ford for Clubb Racing Inc.

== Racing career ==
Maconi has previously competed in the CRA Late Model Sportsman Series.

In 2025, Maconi was scheduled to drive for Rise Motorsports in the pre-season test for the main ARCA Menards Series at Daytona International Speedway, although he would not run due to the team withdrawing from the test. A few months later, it was announced that Maconi would make his ARCA Menards Series East debut at Nashville Fairgrounds Speedway, driving for Clubb Racing Inc. in the No. 86 Ford. He finished eighteen laps down in twelfth. He then made his main ARCA series debut with the team at Michigan International Speedway, once again driving the No. 86, where he finished in 26th after running only one lap due to mechanical issues. He then ran two more races in the No. 86 at Lime Rock Park and Madison International Speedway, getting a best finish of seventeenth at Lime Rock. Afterwards, Maconi ran the final two races of the year for CRI, this time in the No. 03, finishing 20th at Kansas Speedway and 21st at Toledo Speedway.

In 2026, Maconi participated in the pre-season test at Daytona International Speedway for CRI, where he set the 73rd quickest time between the two sessions held. A few weeks later, it was announced that Maconi will drive the No. 86 for CRI for fifteen races, beginning at Phoenix Raceway.

== Personal life ==
Maconi is the owner of Maconi Setup Shop, an iRacing setup service, and was one of the first setup shops on the platform.

== Motorsports career results ==
=== Stock car career summary ===
Season	Series	Team	Races	Wins	Top 5	Top 10	Points	Position
2025	ARCA Menards Series East	Clubb Racing Inc.	1	0	0	0	32	55th
2025	ARCA Menards Series	Clubb Racing Inc.	5	0	0	0	116	37th
2026	ARCA Menards Series West	Clubb Racing Inc.	1	0	0	0	4	90th
2026	ARCA Menards Series East	Clubb Racing Inc.	5	0	0	0	115	17th
2026	ARCA Menards Series	Clubb Racing Inc.	19	0	0	0	594	10th

=== ARCA Menards Series ===
(key) (Bold – Pole position awarded by qualifying time. Italics – Pole position earned by points standings or practice time. * – Most laps led. ** – All laps led.)

ARCA Menards Series results
Year	Team	No.	Make	1	2	3	4	5	6	7	8	9	10	11	12	13	14	15	16	17	18	19	20	AMSC	Pts	Ref
2025	Clubb Racing Inc.	86	Ford	DAY	PHO	TAL	KAN	CLT	MCH; 26	BLN	ELK	LRP; 17	DOV	IRP	IOW	GLN	ISF	MAD; 20	DSF	BRI	SLM			37th	116	
2025	Clubb Racing Inc.	03	Ford																			KAN; 20	TOL; 21	37th	116	
2026	Clubb Racing Inc.	86	Ford	DAY	PHO; 40	KAN; 17	TAL; 20	GLN; 27	TOL; 18	MCH; 24	POC; 16	BER; 19	ELK; 15	CHI; 18	LRP; 29	IRP; 21	IOW; 24	ISF; 17	MAD; 17	DSF; 18	SLM; 15	BRI; 23	KAN; 14	10th	594	

==== ARCA Menards Series East ====
ARCA Menards Series East results
Year	Team	No.	Make	1	2	3	4	5	6	7	8	AMSEC	Pts	Ref
2025	Clubb Racing Inc.	86	Ford	FIF	CAR	NSV; 12	FRS	DOV	IRP	IOW	BRI	55th	32	
2026	Clubb Racing Inc.	86	Ford	HCY	CAR	NSV; Wth	TOL; 18	IRP; 21	FRS	IOW; 24	BRI; 23	17th	115	
2026	Clubb Racing Inc.	03	Ford			NSV; 19						17th	115	

==== ARCA Menards Series West ====
ARCA Menards Series West results
Year	Team	No.	Make	1	2	3	4	5	6	7	8	9	10	11	12	13	AMSWC	Pts	Ref
2026	Clubb Racing Inc.	86	Ford	KER	PHO; 40	TUC	SHA	CNS	TRI	SON	PIR	AAS	MAD	LVS	PHO	KER	90th	4	
