= Jackson McLerran =

American racing driver

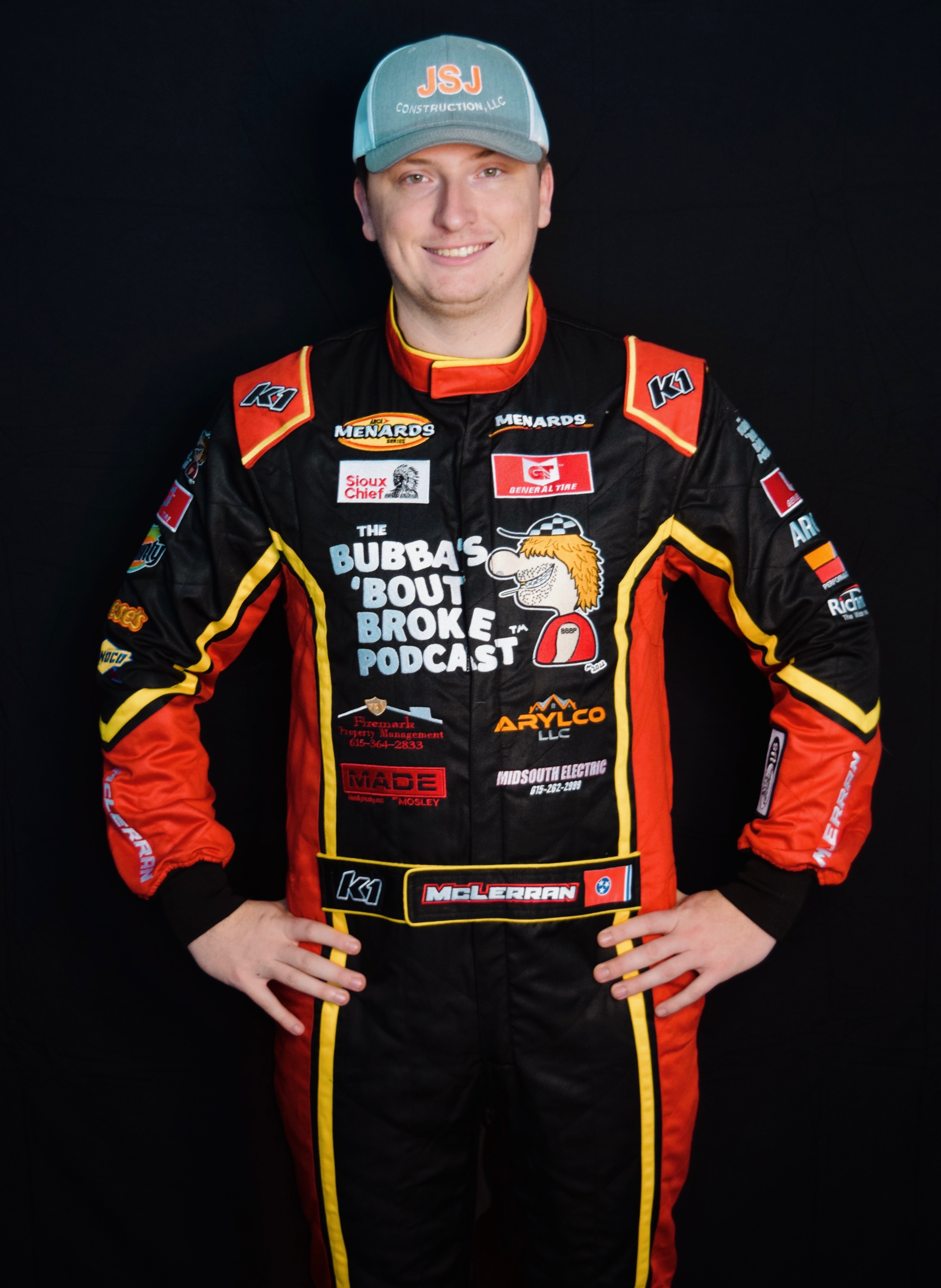
- Born: Jackson Reed McLerran; May 3, 1999 (age 27); Portland, Tennessee, U.S.

ARCA Menards Series career
- 8 races run over 3 years
- Best finish: 47th (2026)
- First race: 2024 Circle City 200 (IRP)
- Last race: 2026 Bush's Best 200 (Bristol)
Wins	Top tens	Poles
0	0	0

ARCA Menards Series East career
- 13 races run over 3 years
- Best finish: 5th (2026)
- First race: 2024 Circle City 200 (IRP)
- Last race: 2026 Bush's Best 200 (Bristol)
Wins	Top tens	Poles
0	6	0
- Statistics up to date as of September 26, 2026.

Jackson Reed McLerran (born May 3, 1999) is an American professional stock car racing driver. He last competed full-time in the ARCA Menards Series East and part-time in the ARCA Menards Series, driving the No. 06/95/96 Toyota for MAN Motorsports.

== Racing career ==
McLerran has previously competed in series such as the CRA JEGS All-Stars Tour and the CRA Street Stocks Series.

In 2024, it was revealed that McLerran would make his debut in the ARCA Menards Series at Lucas Oil Indianapolis Raceway Park, driving the No. 96 Toyota for MAN Motorsports. As the event is also a combination event with the ARCA Menards Series East, it also served as his debut in that series as well. He started in thirtieth and finished in 26th due to a crash.

In 2025, it was revealed that McLerran would run a partial schedule in the East Series for MAN Motorsports, this time driving the No. 95 entry.

== Personal life ==
McLerran previously attended Westmoreland High School.

== Motorsports results ==
=== Stock car career summary ===
Season	Series	Team	Races	Wins	Top 5	Top 10	Points	Position
2024	ARCA Menards Series East	MAN Motorsports	1	0	0	0	19	56th
2024	ARCA Menards Series	MAN Motorsports	1	0	0	0	19	106th
2025	ARCA Menards Series East	MAN Motorsports	4	0	0	2	115	21st
2025	ARCA Menards Series	MAN Motorsports	3	0	0	0	73	65th
2026	ARCA Menards Series East	MAN Motorsports	8	0	0	4	338	5th
2026	ARCA Menards Series	MAN Motorsports	4	0	0	0	92	47th

=== ARCA Menards Series ===
(key) (Bold – Pole position awarded by qualifying time. Italics – Pole position earned by points standings or practice time. * – Most laps led.)

ARCA Menards Series results
Year	Team	No.	Make	1	2	3	4	5	6	7	8	9	10	11	12	13	14	15	16	17	18	19	20	AMSC	Pts	Ref
2024	MAN Motorsports	96	Toyota	DAY	PHO	TAL	DOV	KAN	CLT	IOW	MOH	BLN	IRP; 25	SLM	ELK	MCH	ISF	MLW	DSF	GLN	BRI	KAN	TOL	106th	19	
2025	MAN Motorsports	96	Toyota	DAY	PHO	TAL	KAN	CLT	MCH	BLN	ELK	LRP	DOV	IRP; 20	IOW	GLN	ISF	MAD	DSF					65th	73	
2025	MAN Motorsports	95	Toyota																	BRI; 26	SLM	KAN	TOL; 13	65th	73	
2026	MAN Motorsports	95	Toyota	DAY	PHO	KAN	TAL	GLN	TOL; 25	MCH	POC	BER	ELK	CHI	LRP		IOW; 28	ISF	MAD	DSF	SLM			47th	92	
2026	MAN Motorsports	06	Toyota													IRP; 15								47th	92	
2026	MAN Motorsports	96	Toyota																			BRI; 16	KAN	47th	92	

==== ARCA Menards Series East ====
ARCA Menards Series East results
Year	Team	No.	Make	1	2	3	4	5	6	7	8	AMSEC	Pts	Ref
2024	MAN Motorsports	96	Toyota	FIF	DOV	NSV	FRS	IOW	IRP; 25	MLW	BRI	56th	19	
2025	MAN Motorsports	96	Toyota	FIF; Wth	CAR	NSV; 6			IRP; 20	IOW		21st	115	
2025	MAN Motorsports	95	Toyota				FRS; 9	DOV			BRI; 26	21st	115	
2026	MAN Motorsports	95	Toyota	HCY; 8	CAR; 6		TOL; 25		FRS; 8	IOW; 28		5th	338	
2026	MAN Motorsports	96	Toyota			NSV; 8					BRI; 16	5th	338	
2026	MAN Motorsports	06	Toyota					IRP; 15				5th	338	
