= 2026 Bush's Best 200 =

American stock car race

Race details
- Race 19 of 20 in the 2026 ARCA Menards Series; Race 8 of 8 in the 2026 ARCA Menards Series East
- Date: September 17, 2026
- Location: Bristol Motor Speedway in Bristol, Tennessee
- Course: Permanent racing facility
- Course length: 0.533 miles (0.858 km)
- Distance: 200 laps, 106.6 mi (171.556 km)
- Average speed: 73.800 miles per hour (118.770 km/h)

Pole position
Driver	Carson Brown	Pinnacle Racing Group
- Time: 15.334

Most laps led
Driver	Carson Brown	Pinnacle Racing Group
- Laps: 200

Fastest lap
Driver	Carson Brown	Pinnacle Racing Group
- Time: 15.751

Winner
No. 28	Carson Brown	Pinnacle Racing Group

Television in the United States
- Network: FS1
- Announcers: Brent Stover and Phil Parsons

Radio in the United States
- Radio: MRN
- Booth announcers: Alex Hayden and Mike Bagley
- Turn announcers: Kurt Becker (Turns 2 & 3)

The 2026 Bush's Best 200 was an ARCA Menards Series and ARCA Menards Series East combination race held on Thursday, September 17, 2026, at Bristol Motor Speedway in Bristol, Tennessee. Contested over 200 laps on the 0.533-mile (0.858 km) concrete oval, it was the 19th race of the 2026 ARCA Menards Series season, the 8th and final race of the 2026 ARCA Menards Series East season, and the 7th running of the event.

Carson Brown, driving for Pinnacle Racing Group, pulled off a dominating performance, leading every lap from the pole position to earn his third career ARCA Menards Series win, his third of the season, and his first career ARCA Menards Series East win. Tristan McKee finished second, and Kaden Honeycutt finished third. Max Reaves and Isaac Kitzmiller rounded out the top five, while Jake Bollman, Jade Avedisian, Andy Jankowiak, Thomas Annunziata, and Taylor Mayhew rounded out the top ten.

With a second-place finish, McKee of Pinnacle Racing Group clinched the 2026 ARCA Menards Series East championship, three points ahead of his rival Reaves. At 16 years, 1 month and 14 days old, McKee became the youngest champion in series history.

== Report ==
=== Background ===
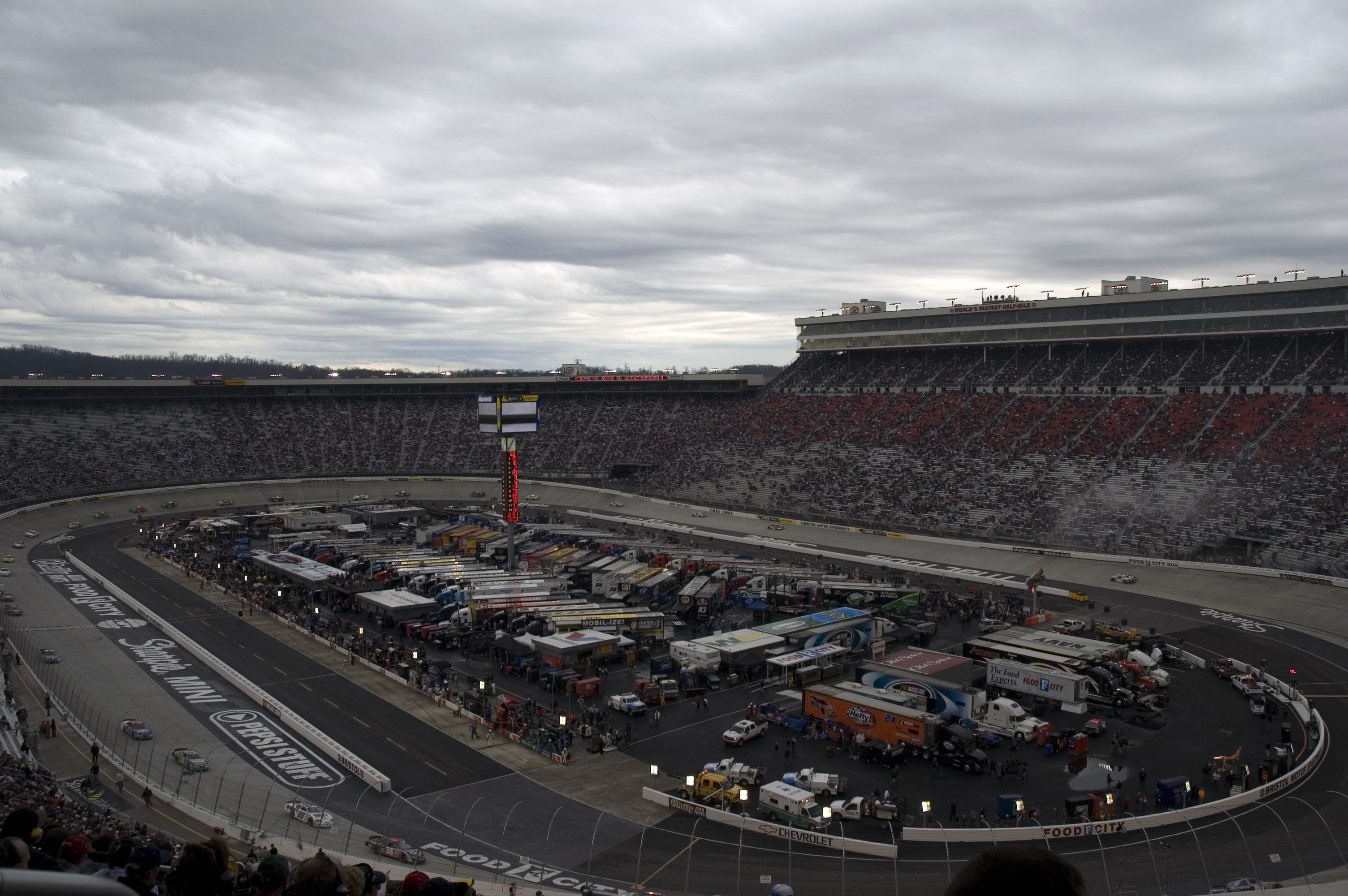
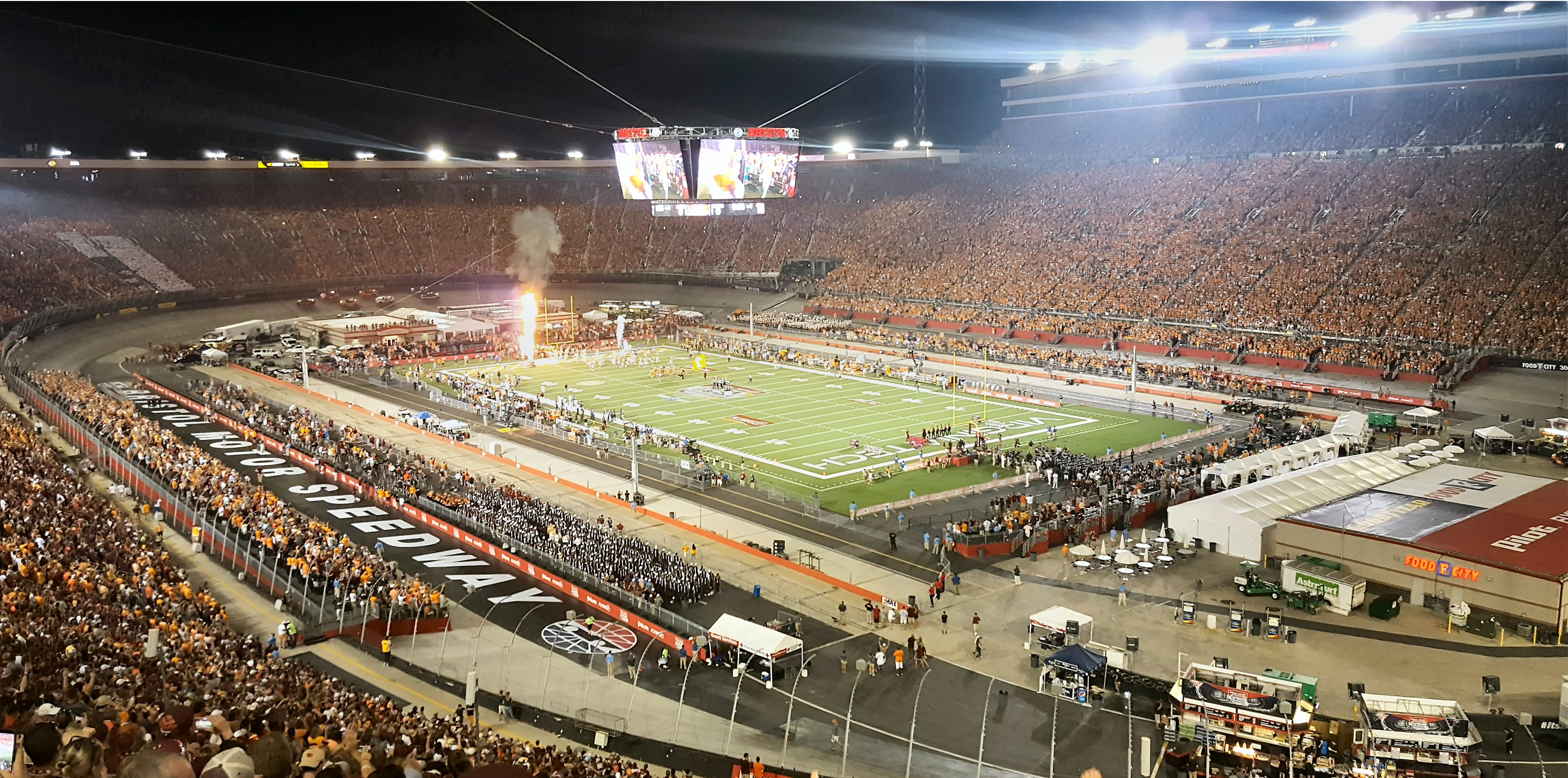
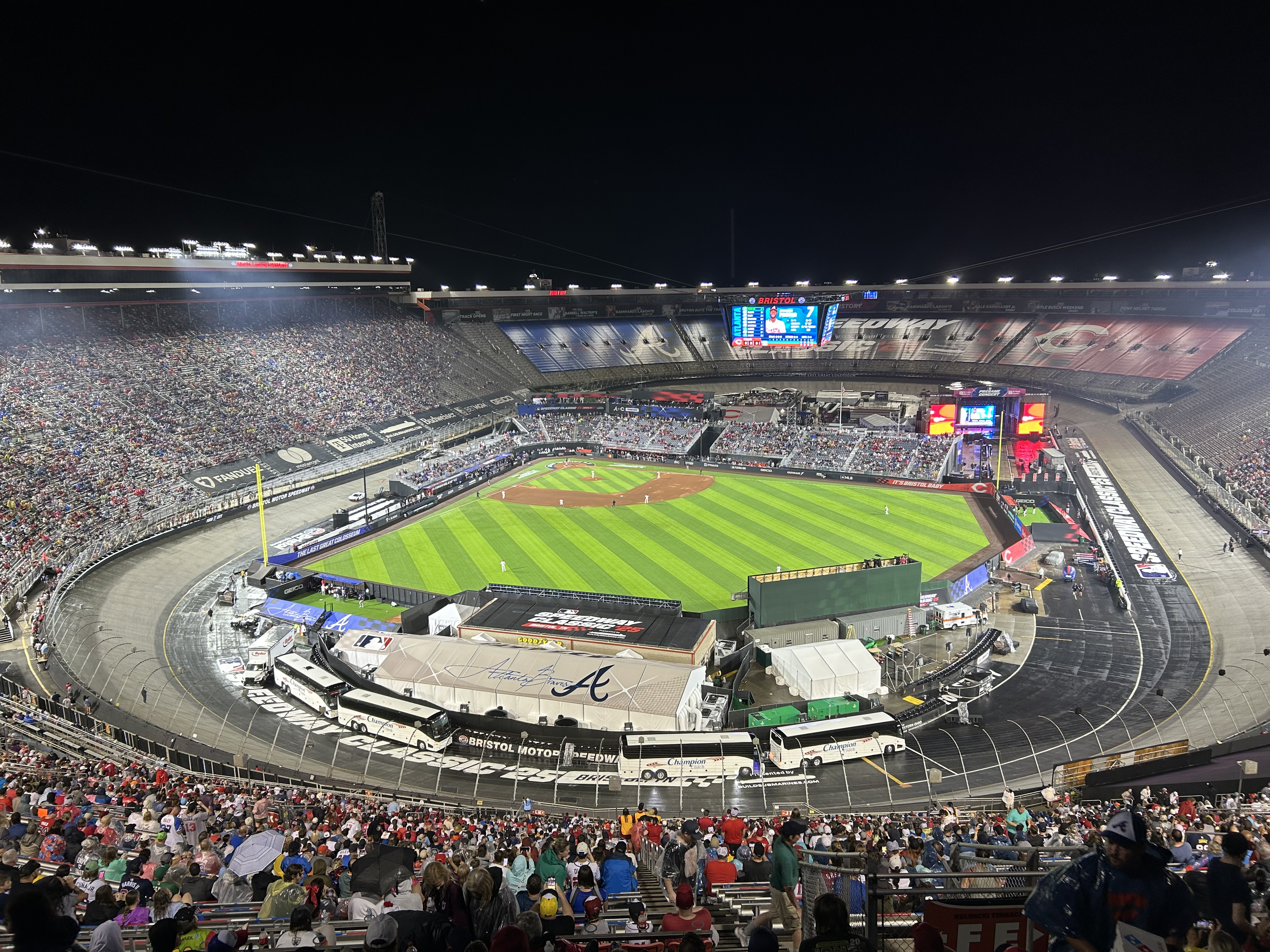
The Track (left) the Battle at Bristol (center) and the MLB Speedway Classic (right), are all events previously held at Bristol Motor Speedway.

The Bristol Motor Speedway, formerly known as Bristol International Raceway and Bristol Raceway, is a NASCAR short track venue located in Bristol, Tennessee. Constructed in 1960, it held its first NASCAR race on July 30, 1961. Despite its short length, Bristol is among the most popular tracks on the NASCAR schedule because of its distinct features, which include extraordinarily steep banking, an all concrete surface, two pit roads, and stadium-like seating. It has also been named one of the loudest NASCAR tracks.

Besides holding racing events, the track has hosted the Battle at Bristol, a college football game between the Tennessee Volunteers and Virginia Tech Hokies on September 10, 2016 and the MLB Speedway Classic, a MLB baseball game between the Atlanta Braves and the Cincinnati Reds from August 2-3, 2025.

==== Entry list ====
- (R) denotes rookie driver.

#	Driver	Team	Make
0	Nate Moeller	Wayne Peterson Motorsports	Chevrolet
1	Jake Finch	Phoenix Racing	Chevrolet
03	Alex Clubb	Clubb Racing Inc.	Ford
06	Con Nicolopoulos	Wayne Peterson Motorsports	Toyota
10	Craig Pellegrini Jr. (R)	Fast Track Racing	Toyota
11	Chase Buscaglia	Fast Track Racing	Toyota
12	Takuma Koga	Fast Track Racing	Toyota
13	Brian Weber	Integrity Autosports	Toyota
15	Jade Avedisian	Nitro Motorsports	Toyota
17	Kaden Honeycutt	Cook Racing Technologies	Toyota
18	Max Reaves (R)	Joe Gibbs Racing	Toyota
19	Brad Perez	Maples Motorsports	Chevrolet
20	Jake Bollman (R)	Nitro Motorsports	Toyota
25	Gavan Boschele (R)	Nitro Motorsports	Toyota
28	Carson Brown (R)	Pinnacle Racing Group	Chevrolet
34	Ivis Earley	VWV Racing	Toyota
36	Ty Fredrickson	Team 36	Toyota
38	Gabriel Casagrande	MCM Racing Development	Toyota
40	Andrew Patterson	Andrew Patterson Racing	Chevrolet
42	Taylor Mayhew	Cook Racing Technologies	Chevrolet
48	Brad Smith	Brad Smith Motorsports	Ford
53	Zachary Tinkle	Tinkle Family Racing	Toyota
55	Isabella Robusto	Nitro Motorsports	Toyota
70	Thomas Annunziata	Nitro Motorsports	Toyota
71	Andy Jankowiak	KLAS Motorsports	Chevrolet
77	Tristan McKee (R)	Pinnacle Racing Group	Chevrolet
79	Isaac Kitzmiller	ACR Motorsports	Chevrolet
85	Quinn Davis (R)	City Garage Motorsports	Ford
86	Jeff Maconi (R)	Clubb Racing Inc.	Ford
89	Bobby Dale Earnhardt	Rise Racing	Chevrolet
91	Austin Vaughn	Maples Motorsports	Ford
95	Hunter Wright	MAN Motorsports	Toyota
96	Jackson McLerran (R)	MAN Motorsports	Toyota
97	Jason Kitzmiller	CR7 Motorsports	Chevrolet
99	Michael Maples	Maples Motorsports	Chevrolet
Official entry list

== Practice ==
The first and only practice session was held on Thursday, September 17, at 1:00 PM EST, and lasted for 45 minutes.

Carson Brown, driving for Pinnacle Racing Group, set the fastest time in the session, with a lap of 15.427 seconds, and a speed of 124.379 miles per hour (200.169 km/h).

Pos.	#	Driver	Team	Make	Time	Speed
1	28	Carson Brown (R)	Pinnacle Racing Group	Chevrolet	15.427	124.379
2	18	Max Reaves (R)	Joe Gibbs Racing	Toyota	15.470	124.034
3	55	Isabella Robusto	Nitro Motorsports	Toyota	15.475	123.994
Full practice results

== Qualifying ==
Qualifying was held on Thursday, September 17, at 2:00 PM EST. The qualifying procedure used was a multi-car, multi-lap based system. All drivers were on track for a 20-minute timed session, and whoever set the fastest time in that session won the pole.

Carson Brown, driving for Pinnacle Racing Group, qualified on pole position with a lap of 15.334 seconds, and a speed of 125.134 miles per hour (201.384 km/h).

=== Qualifying results ===
Pos.	#	Driver	Team	Make	Time	Speed
1	28	Carson Brown (R)	Pinnacle Racing Group	Chevrolet	15.334	125.134
2	70	Thomas Annunziata	Nitro Motorsports	Toyota	15.445	124.234
3	77	Tristan McKee (R)	Pinnacle Racing Group	Chevrolet	15.481	123.945
4	20	Jake Bollman (R)	Nitro Motorsports	Toyota	15.513	123.690
5	25	Gavan Boschele (R)	Nitro Motorsports	Toyota	15.538	123.491
6	97	Jason Kitzmiller	CR7 Motorsports	Chevrolet	15.559	123.324
7	18	Max Reaves (R)	Joe Gibbs Racing	Toyota	15.563	123.292
8	79	Isaac Kitzmiller	ACR Motorsports	Chevrolet	15.569	123.245
9	17	Kaden Honeycutt	Cook Racing Technologies	Toyota	15.581	123.150
10	1	Jake Finch	Phoenix Racing	Chevrolet	15.605	122.961
11	15	Jade Avedisian	Nitro Motorsports	Toyota	15.626	122.795
12	55	Isabella Robusto	Nitro Motorsports	Toyota	15.742	121.890
13	42	Taylor Mayhew	Cook Racing Technologies	Chevrolet	15.812	121.351
14	71	Andy Jankowiak	KLAS Motorsports	Chevrolet	15.865	120.945
15	36	Ty Fredrickson	Team 36	Toyota	15.873	120.885
16	40	Andrew Patterson	Andrew Patterson Racing	Chevrolet	15.911	120.596
17	53	Zachary Tinkle	Tinkle Family Racing	Toyota	15.957	120.248
18	95	Hunter Wright	MAN Motorsports	Toyota	16.017	119.798
19	96	Jackson McLerran (R)	MAN Motorsports	Toyota	16.043	119.604
20	38	Gabriel Casagrande	MCM Racing Development	Toyota	16.062	119.462
21	19	Brad Perez	Maples Motorsports	Chevrolet	16.459	116.581
22	89	Bobby Dale Earnhardt	Rise Racing	Chevrolet	16.609	115.528
23	91	Austin Vaughn	Maples Motorsports	Ford	17.008	112.817
24	13	Brian Weber	Integrity Autosports	Toyota	17.229	111.370
25	10	Craig Pellegrini Jr. (R)	Fast Track Racing	Toyota	17.278	111.055
26	12	Takuma Koga	Fast Track Racing	Toyota	17.496	109.671
27	34	Ivis Earley	VWV Racing	Toyota	17.513	109.564
28	99	Michael Maples	Maples Motorsports	Chevrolet	17.968	106.790
29	03	Alex Clubb	Clubb Racing Inc.	Ford	18.173	105.585
30	86	Jeff Maconi (R)	Clubb Racing Inc.	Ford	18.808	102.020
31	48	Brad Smith	Brad Smith Motorsports	Ford	19.164	100.125
32	0	Nate Moeller	Wayne Peterson Motorsports	Chevrolet	21.098	90.947
33	85	Quinn Davis (R)	City Garage Motorsports	Ford	—	—
34	06	Con Nicolopoulos	Wayne Peterson Motorsports	Toyota	—	—
35	11	Chase Buscaglia	Fast Track Racing	Toyota	—	—
Official qualifying results

== Race ==
=== Race results ===
Laps: 200

Fin	St	#	Driver	Team	Make	Laps	Led	Status	Pts
1	1	28	Carson Brown (R)	Pinnacle Racing Group	Chevrolet	200	200	Running	49
2	3	77	Tristan McKee (R)	Pinnacle Racing Group	Chevrolet	200	0	Running	42
3	9	17	Kaden Honeycutt	Cook Racing Technologies	Toyota	200	0	Running	41
4	7	18	Max Reaves (R)	Joe Gibbs Racing	Toyota	200	0	Running	40
5	8	79	Isaac Kitzmiller	ACR Motorsports	Chevrolet	200	0	Running	39
6	4	20	Jake Bollman (R)	Nitro Motorsports	Toyota	200	0	Running	38
7	11	15	Jade Avedisian	Nitro Motorsports	Toyota	200	0	Running	37
8	14	71	Andy Jankowiak	KLAS Motorsports	Chevrolet	200	0	Running	36
9	2	70	Thomas Annunziata	Nitro Motorsports	Toyota	200	0	Running	35
10	13	42	Taylor Mayhew	Cook Racing Technologies	Chevrolet	199	0	Running	34
11	6	97	Jason Kitzmiller	CR7 Motorsports	Chevrolet	199	0	Running	33
12	16	40	Andrew Patterson	Andrew Patterson Racing	Chevrolet	199	0	Running	32
13	5	25	Gavan Boschele (R)	Nitro Motorsports	Toyota	199	0	Running	31
14	15	36	Ty Fredrickson	Team 36	Toyota	199	0	Running	30
15	20	38	Gabriel Casagrande	MCM Racing Development	Toyota	199	0	Running	29
16	19	96	Jackson McLerran (R)	MAN Motorsports	Toyota	196	0	Running	28
17	25	10	Craig Pellegrini Jr. (R)	Fast Track Racing	Toyota	194	0	Running	27
18	23	91	Austin Vaughn	Maples Motorsports	Ford	192	0	Running	26
19	24	13	Brian Weber	Integrity Autosports	Toyota	192	0	Running	25
20	12	55	Isabella Robusto	Nitro Motorsports	Toyota	188	0	Running	24
21	31	03	Alex Clubb	Clubb Racing Inc.	Ford	184	0	Running	23
22	29	11	Chase Buscaglia	Fast Track Racing	Toyota	182	0	Running	22
23	33	86	Jeff Maconi (R)	Clubb Racing Inc.	Ford	180	0	Running	21
24	26	12	Takuma Koga	Fast Track Racing	Toyota	179	0	Running	20
25	30	85	Quinn Davis (R)	City Garage Motorsports	Ford	174	0	Running	19
26	28	99	Michael Maples	Maples Motorsports	Chevrolet	162	0	Running	18
27	27	34	Ivis Earley	VWV Racing	Toyota	150	0	Running	17
28	10	1	Jake Finch	Phoenix Racing	Chevrolet	129	0	Mechanical	16
29	32	06	Con Nicolopoulos	Wayne Peterson Motorsports	Toyota	114	0	Accident	15
30	17	53	Zachary Tinkle	Tinkle Family Racing	Toyota	89	0	Accident	14
31	35	48	Brad Smith	Brad Smith Motorsports	Ford	48	0	Mechanical	13
32	18	95	Hunter Wright	MAN Motorsports	Toyota	44	0	Accident	12
33	22	89	Bobby Dale Earnhardt	Rise Racing	Chevrolet	42	0	Accident	11
34	21	19	Brad Perez	Maples Motorsports	Chevrolet	11	0	Mechanical	10
35	34	0	Nate Moeller	Wayne Peterson Motorsports	Chevrolet	1	0	Mechanical	9
Official race results

=== Race statistics ===
- Lead changes: 0 among 1 different driver
- Cautions/Laps: 5 for 55 laps
- Red flags: 0
- Time of race: 1 hour, 26 minutes and 40 seconds
- Average speed: 73.800 miles per hour (118.770 km/h)

== Standings after the race ==
Drivers' Championship standings (ARCA Main)

	Pos	Driver	Points
	1	Jake Bollman	874
	2	Thomas Annunziata	858 (–16)
	3	Isabella Robusto	728 (–146)
	4	Jason Kitzmiller	699 (–175)
	5	Takuma Koga	672 (–202)
1	6	Alex Clubb	609 (–265)
1	7	Michael Maples	608 (–266)
	8	Brad Smith	525 (–349)
1	9	Max Reaves	523 (–351)
1	10	Jeff Maconi	514 (–360)

Drivers' Championship standings (ARCA East)

	Pos	Driver	Points
	1	Tristan McKee	431
	2	Max Reaves	428 (–3)
	3	Isaac Kitzmiller	411 (–20)
	4	Craig Pellegrini Jr.	360 (–71)
1	5	Jackson McLerran	338 (–93)
2	6	Carson Brown	332 (–99)
	7	Austin Vaughn	332 (–99)
3	8	Quinn Davis	331 (–100)
	9	Nate Moeller	290 (–141)
	10	Michael Maples	226 (–205)

- Note: Only the first 10 positions are included for the driver standings.

Previous race: 2026 Spruce 212	ARCA Menards Series; 2026 season	Next race: 2026 Menards 150

Previous race: 2026 JR & CO. 150	ARCA Menards Series East; 2026 season	Next race: 2027 Cook Out 200
