= Isaac Kitzmiller =

American racing driver (born 2009)

- Born: February 26, 2009 (age 17); Maysville, West Virginia, U.S.
- Achievements: 2025 ARCA Menards Series East Champion

ARCA Menards Series career
- 15 races run over 2 years
- ARCA no., team: No. 79 (ACR Motorsports)
- Best finish: 16th (2026)
- First race: 2025 General Tire 150 (Dover)
- Last race: 2026 Bush's Best 200 (Bristol)
Wins	Top tens	Poles
0	12	0

ARCA Menards Series East career
- 16 races run over 2 years
- ARCA East no., team: No. 79 (ACR Motorsports)
- Best finish: 1st (2025)
- First race: 2025 Pensacola 150 (Pensacola)
- Last race: 2026 Bush's Best 200 (Bristol)
Wins	Top tens	Poles
0	15	0

ARCA Menards Series West career
- 1 race run over 1 year
- ARCA West no., team: No. 79 (ACR Motorsports)
- Best finish: 55th (2026)
- First race: 2026 General Tire 150 (Phoenix)
Wins	Top tens	Poles
0	1	0
- Statistics up to date as of November 2, 2026.

Isaac Kitzmiller (born February 26, 2009) is an American professional stock car racing driver who competes full-time in the ARCA Menards Series, driving the No. 79 Chevrolet for CR7 Motorsports. He is the 2025 ARCA Menards Series East champion.

== Racing career ==
Kitzmiller has previously competed in series such as the CARS Pro Late Model Tour, the Grand National Super Series, the INEX Nashville Spring Series, the INEX Summer Shootout, and the World Series of Asphalt Stock Car Racing.

Since 2023, Kitzmiller has been a driver in the Team Hornaday Development program, which was founded in 2022 by Candice Hornaday, daughter of NASCAR Hall of Famer Ron Hornaday Jr.

In 2025, it was revealed that Kitzmiller would participate in the pre-season test for the ARCA Menards Series at Daytona International Speedway, driving the No. 97 Chevrolet for CR7 Motorsports. Two months later, it was revealed that Kitzmiller would make his debut in the ARCA Menards Series East at Five Flags Speedway, driving the No. 79 for CR7 Motorsports with ACR Motorsports. Several days after that, it was announced that Kitzmiller would run the full East Series schedule with the team in the No. 79. He would go on to win the championship over Tyler Reif, scoring top-tens in all eight races in the East Series schedule.

== Personal life ==
Kitzmiller is the son of fellow racing driver Jason Kitzmiller, who currently competes full-time in the ARCA Menards Series for CR7 Motorsports.

== Motorsports career results ==
=== Stock car career summary ===
Season	Series	Team	Races	Wins	Top 5	Top 10	Points	Position
2025	CARS Pro Late Model Tour	Rackley W.A.R.	11	0	6	8	378	5th
2025	CARS Late Model Stock Car Tour	Rackley W.A.R.	1	0	0	0	33	59
2025	ARCA Menards Series East	ACR Motorsports	8	0	3	8	405	**1st**
2025	ARCA Menards Series	ACR Motorsports	4	0	1	4	151	27th
2026	ASA STARS National Tour	Michael Shelton	5	0	0	2		
2026	ASA STARS National Tour	Trevor Cristiani Racing	1	0	0	0		
2026	ARCA Menards Series West	ACR Motorsports	1	0	0	1	37	55th
2026	ARCA Menards Series East	ACR Motorsports	8	0	7	7	411	**3rd**
2026	ARCA Menards Series	ACR Motorsports	11	0	4	8	385	16th

=== ARCA Menards Series ===
(key) (Bold – Pole position awarded by qualifying time. Italics – Pole position earned by points standings or practice time. * – Most laps led. ** – All laps led.)

ARCA Menards Series results
Year	Team	No.	Make	1	2	3	4	5	6	7	8	9	10	11	12	13	14	15	16	17	18	19	20	AMSC	Pts	Ref
2025	ACR Motorsports	79	Chevy	DAY	PHO	TAL	KAN	CLT	MCH	BLN	ELK	LRP	DOV; 4	IRP; 7	IOW; 6	GLN	ISF	MAD	DSF	BRI; 8	SLM	KAN	TOL	27th	151	
2026	ACR Motorsports	79	Chevy	DAY	PHO; 7	KAN	TAL	GLN; 30	TOL; 13	MCH	POC; 11	BER	ELK	CHI	LRP; 8	IRP; 5	IOW; 5	ISF; 2	MAD; 6	DSF; 8	SLM	BRI; 5	KAN	16th	385	

==== ARCA Menards Series East ====
ARCA Menards Series East results
Year	Team	No.	Make	1	2	3	4	5	6	7	8	AMSEC	Pts	Ref
2025	ACR Motorsports	79	Chevy	FIF; 5	CAR; 6	NSV; 4	FRS; 7	DOV; 4	IRP; 7	IOW; 6	BRI; 8	1st	405	
2026	ACR Motorsports	79	Chevy	HCY; 3	CAR; 3	NSV; 5	TOL; 13	IRP; 5	FRS; 3	IOW; 5	BRI; 5	3rd	411	

==== ARCA Menards Series West ====
ARCA Menards Series West results
Year	Team	No.	Make	1	2	3	4	5	6	7	8	9	10	11	12	13	AMSWC	Pts	Ref
2026	ACR Motorsports	79	Chevy	KER	PHO; 7	TUC	SHA	CNS	TRI	SON	PIR	AAS	MAD	LVS	PHO	KER	55th	37	

=== CARS Late Model Stock Car Tour ===
(key) (Bold – Pole position awarded by qualifying time. Italics – Pole position earned by points standings or practice time. * – Most laps led. ** – All laps led.)

CARS Late Model Stock Car Tour results
Year	Team	No.	Make	1	2	3	4	5	6	7	8	9	10	11	12	13	14	15	CLMSCTC	Pts	Ref
2025	Rackley W.A.R.	97	Chevy	AAS	WCS	CDL	OCS	ACE	NWS	LGY	DOM	CRW	HCY	AND	FLC; DNS	SBO; 14	TCM	NWS	59th	33	

=== CARS Pro Late Model Tour ===
(key)

CARS Pro Late Model Tour results
Year	Team	No.	Make	1	2	3	4	5	6	7	8	9	10	11	12	13	CPLMTC	Pts	Ref
2025	Rackley W.A.R.	25	Chevy	AAS; 3	CDL; 10	OCS; 3	ACE	NWS; 12	CRW; 7	HCY		AND; 2	FLC; 4	SBO; 5	TCM; 3	NWS; 12	5th	378	
2025	Rackley W.A.R.	76	Chevy								HCY; 25						5th	378	

=== ASA STARS National Tour ===
(key) (Bold – Pole position awarded by qualifying time. Italics – Pole position earned by points standings or practice time. * – Most laps led. ** – All laps led.)

ASA STARS National Tour results
Year	Team	No.	Make	1	2	3	4	5	6	7	8	9	10	11	ASNTC	Pts	Ref
2026	Michael Shelton	7	Chevy	NSM; DNQ	FIF; 16	HCY; 12	SLG; 10	MAD; 9	NPS		TRI; 17	WIN	NSV	NSM	-*	-*	
2026	Trevor Cristiani Racing	19	Chevy							OWO; 14					-*	-*	
