= Quinn Davis =

American racing driver (born 2008)

- Davis in 2026
- Born: December 30, 2008 (age 17); Tucson, Arizona, U.S.

ARCA Menards Series career
- 9 races run over 2 years
- Best finish: 32nd (2026)
- First race: 2025 Shore Lunch 250 (Elko)
- Last race: 2026 Bush's Best 200 (Bristol)
Wins	Top tens	Poles
0	0	0

ARCA Menards Series East career
- 11 races run over 2 years
- Best finish: 8th (2026)
- First race: 2025 Music City 150 (Nashville Fairgrounds)
- Last race: 2026 Bush's Best 200 (Bristol)
Wins	Top tens	Poles
0	2	0

ARCA Menards Series West career
- 4 races run over 1 year
- Best finish: 23rd (2026)
- First race: 2026 Tucson ARCA Menards West 150 (Tucson)
- Last race: 2026 Desert Diamond Casino West Valley 100 (Phoenix)
Wins	Top tens	Poles
0	0	0
- Statistics up to date as of November 2, 2026.

Quinn Davis (born December 30, 2008) is an American professional stock car racing driver. She last competed full-time in the ARCA Menards Series East, driving the No. 85 Ford for City Garage Motorsports and part-time in the ARCA Menards Series West, driving the No. 77 Toyota for Performance P-1 Motorsports, and the No. 41 Ford for Jan's Towing Racing.

== Racing career ==
Davis has competed in the CRA JEGS All-Stars Tour and the Rogers-Dabbs Performance Pro Late Model Challenge.

In 2025, it was revealed that Davis would make her ARCA Menards Series East debut at Nashville Fairgrounds Speedway, driving the No. 31 Toyota for Rise Motorsports. She finished five laps down in ninth place. A month later, it was announced that Davis would make her ARCA Menards Series debut with the team at Elko Speedway.

Davis' No. 41 car at the Las Vegas Motor Speedway Bullring in 2026

On September 19, 2025, it was announced that Davis would run full-time in the ARCA Menards Series East in 2026, driving the No. 5 Ford for City Garage Motorsports. In January 2026, it was revealed that Davis would also participate with CGM in the pre-season test for the ARCA Menards Series at Daytona International Speedway, where she set the 68th quickest time between the two sessions held. She would instead run the No. 85 full-time after Becca Monopoli had left the team. In her East Series starts, she had a best finish of fifth at Flat Rock Speedway and finished eighth in the final points standings. She also made four starts in the ARCA Menards Series West, getting a best finish of 13th in her first start at Tucson Speedway.

In November 2026, it was revealed that Davis will not return to CGM for the 2027 season.

== Personal life ==
Davis was originally born in Tucson, Arizona, but moved to Sparta, Tennessee in 2022.

== Motorsports results ==
=== Career summary ===
Season	Series	Team	Races	Wins	Top 5	Top 10	Points	Position
2025	ARCA Menards Series	Rise Motorsports	4	0	0	0	119	36th
2025	ARCA Menards Series East	Rise Motorsports	3	0	0	1	89	26th
2026	ARCA Menards Series	City Garage Motorsports	4	0	0	0	140	32nd
2026	ARCA Menards Series	Rise Racing	1	0	0	0	140	32nd
2026	ARCA Menards Series East	City Garage Motorsports	8	0	1	1	331	8th
2026	ARCA Menards Series West	Performance P–1 Motorsports	2	0	0	0	107	23rd
2026	ARCA Menards Series West	Jan's Towing Racing	2	0	0	0	107	23rd

=== ARCA Menards Series ===
(key) (Bold – Pole position awarded by qualifying time. Italics – Pole position earned by points standings or practice time. * – Most laps led. ** – All laps led.)

ARCA Menards Series results
Year	Team	No.	Make	1	2	3	4	5	6	7	8	9	10	11	12	13	14	15	16	17	18	19	20	AMSC	Pts	Ref
2025	Rise Motorsports	31	Toyota	DAY	PHO	TAL	KAN	CLT	MCH	BLN	ELK; 11	LRP	DOV	IRP; 19	IOW; 15	GLN	ISF	MAD; 12	DSF	BRI	SLM	KAN	TOL	36th	119	
2026	City Garage Motorsports	85	Ford	DAY	PHO	KAN	TAL	GLN	TOL; 12	MCH	POC	BER	ELK	CHI	LRP	IRP; 11	IOW; 15	ISF	MAD	DSF		BRI; 25	KAN	32nd	140	
2026	Rise Racing	89	Chevy																		SLM; 17			32nd	140	

==== ARCA Menards Series East ====
ARCA Menards Series East results
Year	Team	No.	Make	1	2	3	4	5	6	7	8	AMSEC	Pts	Ref
2025	Rise Motorsports	31	Toyota	FIF	CAR	NSV; 9	FRS	DOV	IRP; 19	IOW; 15	BRI	26th	89	
2026	City Garage Motorsports	85	Ford	HCY; 16	CAR; 21	NSV; 16	TOL; 12	IRP; 11	FRS; 5	IOW; 15	BRI; 25	8th	331	

==== ARCA Menards Series West ====
ARCA Menards Series West results
Year	Team	No.	Make	1	2	3	4	5	6	7	8	9	10	11	12	13	AMSWC	Pts	Ref
2026	Performance P-1 Motorsports	77	Toyota	KER	PHO	TUC; 13	SHA	CNS	TRI; 16	SON	PIR	AAS	MAD				23rd	107	
2026	Jan's Towing Racing	41	Ford											LVS; 14	PHO; 26	KER	23rd	107	
