= ARCA races at Hickory =

ARCA Menards Series East race at Hickory Motor Speedway

Cook Out 200
ARCA Menards Series East
- Venue: Hickory Motor Speedway
- Location: Hickory, North Carolina; United States
- First race: 2026
- Distance: 72.6 mi
- Laps: 200

Circuit information
- Surface: Asphalt
- Length: 0.363 mi (0.584 km)
- Turns: 4

Stock car racing events in the ARCA Menards Series East have been held at Hickory Motor Speedway, in Hickory, North Carolina beginning in 2026.

== History ==
From 2023 to 2025, the race at Pensacola was the season-opener. In 2026, the season-opener was moved to Hickory Motor Speedway for an AMSE event.

== Past winners ==
Year	Date	No.	Driver	Team	Manufacturer	Race Distance		Race Time	Average Speed (mph)	Report	Ref
Year	Date	No.	Driver	Team	Manufacturer	Laps	Miles (km)	Race Time	Average Speed (mph)	Report	Ref
2026	March 28	77	Tristan McKee	Pinnacle Racing Group	Chevrolet	200	72.6 (116.838)	01:17:50	55.396	Report	
