= Landon Brown (racing driver) =

American racing driver (born 2006)

- Born: February 8, 2006 (age 20); Louisville, Kentucky

ARCA Menards Series career
- 3 races run over 1 year
- Best finish: 62nd (2026)
- First race: 2026 Ashley Furniture 150 (Chicagoland)
- Last race: 2026 Menards 150 (Kansas)
Wins	Top tens	Poles
0	0	0

ARCA Menards Series East career
- 2 races run over 1 year
- Best finish: 42nd (2026)
- First race: 2026 Cook Out Music City 150 (Nashville Fairgrounds)
- Last race: 2026 LiUNA! 150 (IRP)
Wins	Top tens	Poles
0	0	0

ARCA Menards Series West career
- 1 race run over 1 year
- Best finish: 70th (2026)
- First race: 2026 Desert Diamond Casino West Valley 100 (Phoenix)
Wins	Top tens	Poles
0	0	0
- Statistics up to date as of November 2, 2026.

Landon Brown (born February 7, 2006) is an American professional stock car racing driver. He last part-time in the ARCA Menards Series West, driving the No. 10 Toyota for Nitro Motorsports. He has previously competed in the ARCA Menards Series, ARCA Menards Series East, USSA Mel Kenyon Midget Series and the Lucas Oil Formula Car Race Series.

== Racing career ==
=== Early career ===
Brown first started racing in go-karts at the age of seven, before moving to dirt oval kart racing.

In 2023, Brown competed in five races in the USSA Mel Kenyon Midget Series, where he finished in the top-ten in all races with a best finish of eighth at Anderson Speedway. He competed full-time in the series the following year, where he finished fourth in the points with a best finish of third on three occasions, and won rookie of the year honors. During the offseason, Brown was involved in a crash in the Indoor Rumble at Fort Wayne, where he suffered a fractured neck and back. After recovering, he competed in the Lucas Oil School of Racing Formula Car Series at the Putnam Park Road Course. Afterwards, he returned to the Kenyon Midget Series from Anderson onwards, and got his first series win at Kalamazoo Raceway. He won a further two races at Salem Speedway and Anderson.

=== ARCA Menards Series West ===
On October 9, 2026, it was announced that Brown would compete at Phoenix, driving the No. 10 Toyota for Nitro Motorsports.

=== ARCA Menards Series East ===
In 2026, it was announced that Brown would run select races in the ARCA Menards Series East for Kimmel Racing starting at Nashville Fairgrounds Speedway. In his debut at Nashville, he qualified in sixth but finished in 17th due to mechanical issues. He also did the ARCA / ARCA East combination race at IRP, where he qualified 14th and finished in 18th.

=== ARCA Menards Series ===
In 2026, it was announced that Brown would run select races in the ARCA Menards Series for Kimmel Racing beginning at Chicagoland Speedway, where he started and finished in 15th, and a Lucas Oil Indianapolis Raceway Park, where he qualified 14th and finished in 18th. Later that year, it was announced that Brown would drive the No. 15 Toyota for Nitro Motorsports at the season finale for the main ARCA series at Kansas Speedway. He qualified in 19th after qualifying was rained out but finished in 27th due to mechanical issues.

== Personal life ==
Brown is from Louisville, Kentucky. His father, Phil, competed in karts with him after the two joined a karting league together.

Brown attended Trinity High School in Louisville, where he was named to the school's Principal's List. He later graduated from Trinity and enrolled at the University of Kentucky, where he is pursuing an engineering degree.

== Motorsports career results ==
=== Stock car career summary ===
Season	Series	Team	Races	Wins	Top 5	Top 10	Points	Position
2026	ARCA Menards Series West	Nitro Motorsports	1	0	0	0	27	70th
2026	ARCA Menards Series East	Kimmel Racing	2	0	0	0	53	42nd
2026	ARCA Menards Series	Kimmel Racing	1	0	0	0	72	62nd
2026	ARCA Menards Series	Nitro Motorsports	1	0	0	0	72	62nd

=== ARCA Menards Series ===
(key) (Bold – Pole position awarded by qualifying time. Italics – Pole position earned by points standings or practice time. * – Most laps led. ** – All laps led.)

ARCA Menards Series results
Year	Team	No.	Make	1	2	3	4	5	6	7	8	9	10	11	12	13	14	15	16	17	18	19	20	AMSC	Pts	Ref
2026	Kimmel Racing	69	Ford	DAY	PHO	KAN	TAL	GLN	TOL	MCH	POC	BER	ELK	CHI; 15	LRP	IRP; 18	IOW	ISF	MAD	DSF	SLM	BRI		62nd	72	
2026	Nitro Motorsports	15	Toyota																				KAN; 27	62nd	72	

==== ARCA Menards Series East ====
ARCA Menards Series East results
Year	Team	No.	Make	1	2	3	4	5	6	7	8	AMSEC	Pts	Ref
2026	Kimmel Racing	69	Ford	HCY	CAR	NSV; 17	TOL	IRP; 18	FRS	IOW	BRI	42nd	53	

==== ARCA Menards Series West ====
ARCA Menards Series West results
Year	Team	No.	Make	1	2	3	4	5	6	7	8	9	10	11	12	13	AMSWC	Pts	Ref
2026	Nitro Motorsports	10	Toyota	KER	PHO	TUC	SHA	CNS	TRI	SON	PIR	AAS	MAD	LVS	PHO; 17	KER	70th	27	
