= Kasey Kleyn =

American racing driver

- Born: March 15, 2008 (age 18); Quincy, Washington, U.S.

NASCAR FedEx Freight Truck Series career
- 2 races run over 1 year
- 2026 position: 65th
- Best finish: 65th (2026)
- First race: 2026 FaithFest 250 (North Wilkesboro)
- Last race: 2026 Black's Tire 200 (Martinsville)
| Wins | Top tens | Poles |
|---|---|---|
| 0 | 0 | 0 |

ARCA Menards Series career
- ARCA no., team: No. 25 (Nitro Motorsports)

ARCA Menards Series East career
- ARCA East no., team: No. 25 (Nitro Motorsports)

ARCA Menards Series West career
- 2 races run over 2 years
- ARCA West no., team: No. 25 (Nitro Motorsports)
- Best finish: 44th (2024)
- First race: 2024 NAPA Auto Care 150 (Tri-City)
- Last race: 2026 Desert Diamond Casino West Valley 100 (Phoenix)
| Wins | Top tens | Poles |
|---|---|---|
| 0 | 2 | 0 |
- Statistics up to date as of November 6, 2026.

Kasey Kleyn (born March 15, 2008) is an American professional stock car racing driver who competes full-time in the ARCA Menards Series, driving the No. 25 Toyota for Nitro Motorsports. He has previously competed in the NASCAR Craftsman Truck Series and the CARS Tour.

== Racing career ==
Kleyn has previously competed in series such as the SRL Spears Southwest Tour Series, the Northwest Super Late Model Series (winning the championship in 2024), the SRL SPEARS Pro Late Model Series, the UARA National Late Model Series, the ASA STARS National Tour, and the ASA Southern Super Series.

In 2024, it was revealed that Kleyn would make his ARCA Menards Series West debut at Tri-City Raceway, driving for Jerry Pitts Racing, although he would eventually be entered to drive the No. 88 Ford for Naake Klauer Motorsports. After setting the seventh quickest time in the lone practice session, he qualified in eighth and finished on the lead lap in sixth place.

On May 18, 2026, it was announced that Kleyn would attempt to make his debut in the NASCAR Craftsman Truck Series at North Wilkesboro Speedway, driving the No. 27 Chevrolet for Rackley W.A.R. He would finish in 35th. He would join the team for Richmond, but failed to qualify. Later on, he would drive the No. 62 Toyota for Halmar Friesen Racing at Martinsville Speedway, where he finished in 16th.

On October 13, 2026, it was announced that Kleyn would run a partial schedule in the ARCA Menards Series with Nitro Motorsports for the 2027 season, driving the No. 20 Toyota. However, it would later be revealed that he will instead run the full schedule for the team, this time in the No. 25.

== Motorsports results ==
=== Stock car career summary ===
| Season | Series | Team | Races | Wins | Top 5 | Top 10 | Points | Position |
|---|---|---|---|---|---|---|---|---|
| 2024 | ASA STARS National Tour | Rhonda Kleyn | 2 | 0 | 0 | 0 | 66 | 38th |
| 2024 | ARCA Menards Series West | Naake-Klauer Motorsports | 1 | 0 | 0 | 1 | 38 | 44th |
| 2025 | ASA STARS National Tour | Rhonda Kleyn | 7 | 0 | 2 | 4 | 320 | 15th |
| 2026 | ASA STARS National Tour | Rhonda Kleyn | 2 | 0 | 0 | 0 | | |
| 2026 | ASA STARS National Tour | Wilson Motorsports | 4 | 0 | 1 | 2 | | |
| 2026 | ASA STARS National Tour | Casey Caudill | 4 | 0 | 0 | 2 | | |
| 2026 | CARS Pro Late Model Tour | C3 Race Division | 1 | 0 | 0 | 1 | 37 | 42nd |
| 2026 | CARS Late Model Stock Car Tour | Hettinger Racing | 1 | 0 | 0 | 0 | 14 | 96th |
| 2026 | ARCA Menards Series West | Nitro Motorsports | 1 | 0 | 1 | 1 | 39 | 52nd |
| 2026 | NASCAR Craftsman Truck Series | Rackley W.A.R. | 1 | 0 | 0 | 0 | 23 | 65th |
| 2026 | NASCAR Craftsman Truck Series | Halmar Friesen Racing | 1 | 0 | 0 | 0 | 23 | 65th |

=== NASCAR ===
(key) (Bold – Pole position awarded by qualifying time. Italics – Pole position earned by points standings or practice time. * – Most laps led.)

==== Craftsman Truck Series ====
NASCAR Craftsman Truck Series results
| Year | Team | No. | Make | 1 | 2 | 3 | 4 | 5 | 6 | 7 | 8 | 9 | 10 | 11 | 12 | 13 | 14 | 15 | 16 | 17 | 18 | 19 | 20 | 21 | 22 | 23 | 24 | 25 | NCTC | Pts | Ref |
|---|---|---|---|---|---|---|---|---|---|---|---|---|---|---|---|---|---|---|---|---|---|---|---|---|---|---|---|---|---|---|---|
| 2026 | Rackley W.A.R. | 27 | Chevy | DAY | ATL | STP | DAR | CAR | BRI | TEX | GLN | DOV | CLT | NSH | MCH | COR | LRP | NWS; 35 | IRP | RCH; DNQ | NHA | BRI | KAN | CLT | PHO | TAL | | | 65th | 23 | |
| 2026 | Halmar Friesen Racing | 62 | Toyota | | | | | | | | | | | | | | | | | | | | | | | | MAR; 16 | HOM | 65th | 23 | |

=== ARCA Menards Series West ===
(key) (Bold – Pole position awarded by qualifying time. Italics – Pole position earned by points standings or practice time. * – Most laps led. ** – All laps led.)

ARCA Menards Series West results
| Year | Team | No. | Make | 1 | 2 | 3 | 4 | 5 | 6 | 7 | 8 | 9 | 10 | 11 | 12 | 13 | AMSWC | Pts | Ref |
|---|---|---|---|---|---|---|---|---|---|---|---|---|---|---|---|---|---|---|---|
| 2024 | Naake Klauer Motorsports | 88 | Ford | PHO | KER | PIR | SON | IRW | IRW | SHA | TRI; 6 | MAD | AAS | KER | PHO | | 44th | 38 | |
| 2026 | Nitro Motorsports | 20 | Toyota | KER | PHO | TUC | SHA | CNS | TRI | SON | PIR | AAS | MAD | LVS | PHO; 5 | KER | 52nd | 39 | |

=== CARS Late Model Stock Car Tour ===
(key) (Bold – Pole position awarded by qualifying time. Italics – Pole position earned by points standings or practice time. * – Most laps led. ** – All laps led.)

CARS Late Model Stock Car Tour results
| Year | Team | No. | Make | 1 | 2 | 3 | 4 | 5 | 6 | 7 | 8 | 9 | 10 | 11 | 12 | 13 | 14 | CLMSCTC | Pts | Ref |
|---|---|---|---|---|---|---|---|---|---|---|---|---|---|---|---|---|---|---|---|---|
| 2026 | Hettinger Racing | 51 | Chevy | SNM | WCS | NSV | CRW | ACE | LGY | DOM | NWS; 28 | HCY | AND | FLC | TCM | NPS | SBO | 96th | 14 | |

=== CARS Pro Late Model Tour ===
(key)

CARS Pro Late Model Tour results
| Year | Team | No. | Make | 1 | 2 | 3 | 4 | 5 | 6 | 7 | 8 | 9 | 10 | 11 | CPLMTC | Pts | Ref |
|---|---|---|---|---|---|---|---|---|---|---|---|---|---|---|---|---|---|
| 2026 | C3 Race Division | 3 | Toyota | SNM | NSV | CRW | ACE | NWS; 6 | HCY | AND | FLC | TCM | NPS | SBO | 42nd | 37 | |

=== ASA STARS National Tour ===
(key) (Bold – Pole position awarded by qualifying time. Italics – Pole position earned by points standings or practice time. * – Most laps led. ** – All laps led.)

ASA STARS National Tour results
| Year | Team | No. | Make | 1 | 2 | 3 | 4 | 5 | 6 | 7 | 8 | 9 | 10 | 11 | 12 | ASNTC | Pts | Ref |
|---|---|---|---|---|---|---|---|---|---|---|---|---|---|---|---|---|---|---|
| 2024 | Rhonda Kleyn | 1 | Toyota | NSM | FIF; 27 | HCY | MAD | MLW | AND | OWO | TOL | WIN | NSV; 11 | | | 38th | 66 | |
| 2025 | Rhonda Kleyn | 1 | Toyota | NSM | FIF; 27 | DOM | HCY | NPS | MAD; 5 | SLG; 9 | AND | OWO; 13 | TOL; 4 | WIN; 10 | NSV; 27 | 15th | 320 | |
| 2026 | Rhonda Kleyn | 1 | Toyota | NSM; 19 | FIF; 23 | HCY; Wth | | | | | | | | | | -* | -* | |
| 2026 | Wilson Motorsports | 22K | Toyota | | | | SLG; 12 | MAD; 21 | | OWO; 7 | | | | | | -* | -* | |
| 2026 | Wilson Motorsports | 20 | Toyota | | | | | | NPS; 3 | | | | | | | -* | -* | |
| 2026 | Casey Caudill | 3 | Toyota | | | | | | | | TRI; 13 | WIN; 10 | NSV; 8 | NSM; 16 | | -* | -* | |
