= 2026 Menards 150 =

ARCA Menards Series race at Kansas Speedway

Race details
- Race 20 of 20 in the 2026 ARCA Menards Series
- Date: September 25, 2026
- Location: Kansas Speedway in Kansas City, Kansas
- Course: Permanent racing facility
- Course length: 1.5 miles (2.4 km)
- Distance: 100 laps, 150 mi (241.402 km)
- Average speed: 93.750 miles per hour (150.876 km/h)

Pole position
Driver	Gio Ruggiero	Joe Gibbs Racing
- Grid positions set by competition-based formula

Most laps led
Driver	Gio Ruggiero	Joe Gibbs Racing
- Laps: 84

Fastest lap
Driver	Gio Ruggiero	Joe Gibbs Racing
- Time: 31.168

Winner
No. 28	Carson Brown	Pinnacle Racing Group

Television in the United States
- Network: FS1
- Announcers: Eric Brennan, Phil Parsons and Larry McReynolds

Radio in the United States
- Radio: MRN
- Booth announcers: Alex Hayden, Mike Bagley, and Todd Gordon
- Turn announcers: Dave Moody (1 & 2) and Tim Catalfamo (3 & 4)

The 2026 Menards 150 was an ARCA Menards Series race held on Friday, September 25, 2026, at Kansas Speedway in Kansas City, Kansas. Contested over 100 laps on the 1.5-mile (2.4 km) asphalt oval, it was the 20th and final race of the 2026 ARCA Menards Series season, and the 26th running of the event.

In a race that saw major championship implications, Carson Brown, driving for Pinnacle Racing Group, outdueled Gio Ruggiero in the final restart, and after late contact on the final lap, he was able to pull away and earn his fourth career ARCA Menards Series win, and his fourth of the season. Ruggiero dominated the entirety of the race, leading a race-high 84 laps. He ended up with second, while Gavan Boschele finished third. Lanie Buice and Thomas Annunziata rounded out the top five, while Andy Jankowiak, Jason Kitzmiller, Isabella Robusto, Mike Christopher Jr., and Esteban Rodríguez rounded out the top ten.

With a fifth place finish, and an early wreck involving Jake Bollman, Annunziata clinched the 2026 ARCA Menards Series championship in a tiebreaker with Bollman. With his win at Lime Rock Park, Annunziata won the tiebreaker. Both drivers clashed with each other early in the race, which Bollman showed displeasure with Annunziata post-race after getting spun on lap 24. Bollman's championship run came to an end after being in an incident with Will Kimmel and Austin Vaughn, officially credited with a 21st place finish.

== Report ==
=== Background ===
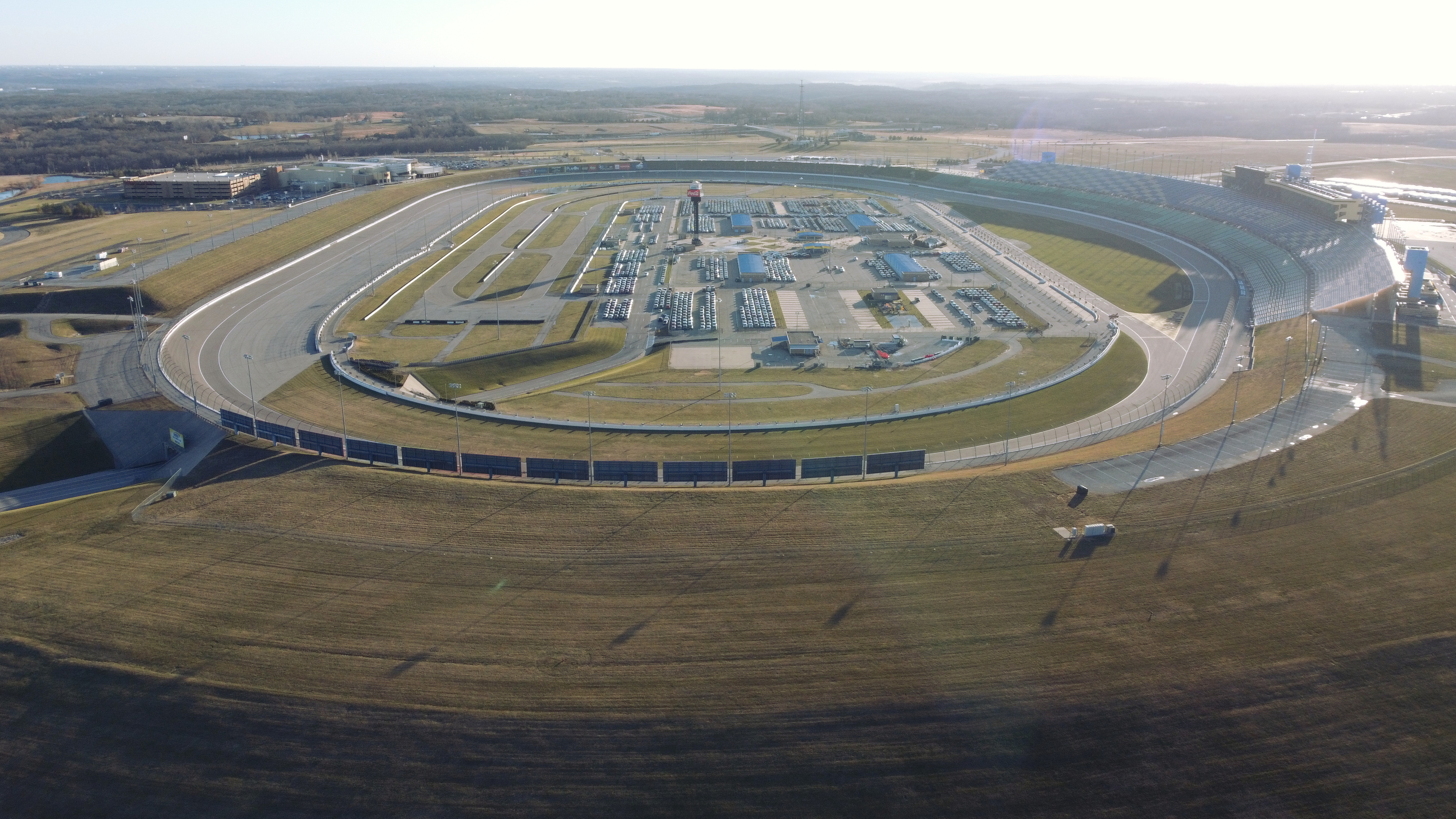
Kansas Speedway, the track where the race will be held.

Kansas Speedway is a 1.5-mile (2.4 km) tri-oval race track in Kansas City, Kansas. It was built in 2001 and it currently hosts two annual NASCAR race weekends. The IndyCar Series also raced at here until 2011. The speedway is owned and operated by NASCAR.

==== Entry list ====
- (R) denotes rookie driver.

#	Driver	Team	Make
03	Alex Clubb	Clubb Racing Inc.	Ford
06	Nate Moeller	Wayne Peterson Motorsports	Chevrolet
9	Landon S. Huffman	CR7 Motorsports	Chevrolet
10	Ed Pompa	Fast Track Racing	Chevrolet
11	D. L. Wilson	Fast Track Racing	Ford
12	Takuma Koga	Fast Track Racing	Toyota
15	Landon Brown	Nitro Motorsports	Toyota
18	Gio Ruggiero	Joe Gibbs Racing	Toyota
20	Jake Bollman (R)	Nitro Motorsports	Toyota
25	Gavan Boschele (R)	Nitro Motorsports	Toyota
28	Carson Brown (R)	Pinnacle Racing Group	Chevrolet
32	Charles Weslowski Jr.	Weslowski Racing	Chevrolet
38	Esteban Rodríguez	MCM Racing Development	Toyota
42	Mike Christopher Jr.	Cook Racing Technologies	Toyota
48	Brad Smith	Brad Smith Motorsports	Ford
55	Isabella Robusto	Nitro Motorsports	Toyota
69	Will Kimmel	Kimmel Racing	Ford
70	Thomas Annunziata	Nitro Motorsports	Toyota
71	Andy Jankowiak	KLAS Motorsports	Chevrolet
77	Lanie Buice	Pinnacle Racing Group	Chevrolet
81	Kevin Campbell	KC Motorsports	Chevrolet
83	Brayton Laster	Clubb Racing Inc.	Ford
86	Jeff Maconi (R)	Clubb Racing Inc.	Ford
89	Bobby Dale Earnhardt	Rise Racing	Chevrolet
91	Austin Vaughn	Maples Motorsports	Ford
97	Jason Kitzmiller	CR7 Motorsports	Chevrolet
99	Michael Maples	Maples Motorsports	Chevrolet
Official entry list

== Starting lineup ==
Practice and qualifying was originally scheduled to be held on Friday, September 25, at 2:00 PM and 3:00 PM CST, but were both cancelled due to inclement weather. The starting lineup was determined by 2026 owners' points. As a result, Gio Ruggiero, driving for Joe Gibbs Racing, was awarded the pole position.

=== Starting lineup ===
Pos.	#	Driver	Team	Make
1	18	Gio Ruggiero	Joe Gibbs Racing	Toyota
2	28	Carson Brown (R)	Pinnacle Racing Group	Chevrolet
3	20	Jake Bollman (R)	Nitro Motorsports	Toyota
4	77	Lanie Buice	Pinnacle Racing Group	Chevrolet
5	70	Thomas Annunziata	Nitro Motorsports	Toyota
6	25	Gavan Boschele (R)	Nitro Motorsports	Toyota
7	91	Austin Vaughn	Maples Motorsports	Ford
8	97	Jason Kitzmiller	CR7 Motorsports	Chevrolet
9	55	Isabella Robusto	Nitro Motorsports	Toyota
10	12	Takuma Koga	Fast Track Racing	Toyota
11	10	Ed Pompa	Fast Track Racing	Chevrolet
12	11	D. L. Wilson	Fast Track Racing	Ford
13	03	Alex Clubb	Clubb Racing Inc.	Ford
14	99	Michael Maples	Maples Motorsports	Chevrolet
15	06	Nate Moeller	Wayne Peterson Motorsports	Chevrolet
16	86	Jeff Maconi (R)	Clubb Racing Inc.	Ford
17	48	Brad Smith	Brad Smith Motorsports	Ford
18	89	Bobby Dale Earnhardt	Rise Racing	Chevrolet
19	15	Landon Brown	Nitro Motorsports	Toyota
20	9	Landon S. Huffman	CR7 Motorsports	Chevrolet
21	71	Andy Jankowiak	KLAS Motorsports	Toyota
22	69	Will Kimmel	Kimmel Racing	Ford
23	42	Mike Christopher Jr.	Cook Racing Technologies	Toyota
24	81	Kevin Campbell	KC Motorsports	Chevrolet
25	38	Esteban Rodríguez	MCM Racing Development	Toyota
26	83	Brayton Laster	Clubb Racing Inc.	Ford
27	32	Charles Weslowski Jr.	Weslowski Racing	Chevrolet
Official starting lineup

== Race ==
=== Race results ===
Laps: 100

Fin	St	#	Driver	Team	Make	Laps	Led	Status	Pts
1	2	28	Carson Brown (R)	Pinnacle Racing Group	Chevrolet	100	14	Running	97
2	1	18	Gio Ruggiero	Joe Gibbs Racing	Toyota	100	84	Running	44
3	6	25	Gavan Boschele (R)	Nitro Motorsports	Toyota	100	0	Running	41
4	4	77	Lanie Buice	Pinnacle Racing Group	Chevrolet	100	0	Running	40
5	5	70	Thomas Annunziata	Nitro Motorsports	Toyota	100	0	Running	89
6	21	71	Andy Jankowiak	KLAS Motorsports	Toyota	100	0	Running	38
7	8	97	Jason Kitzmiller	CR7 Motorsports	Chevrolet	100	0	Running	37
8	9	55	Isabella Robusto	Nitro Motorsports	Toyota	100	0	Running	86
9	23	42	Mike Christopher Jr.	Cook Racing Technologies	Toyota	100	0	Running	35
10	25	38	Esteban Rodríguez	MCM Racing Development	Toyota	100	0	Running	34
11	18	89	Bobby Dale Earnhardt	Rise Racing	Chevrolet	99	0	Running	33
12	12	11	D. L. Wilson	Fast Track Racing	Ford	98	0	Running	32
13	10	12	Takuma Koga	Fast Track Racing	Toyota	95	0	Running	81
14	16	86	Jeff Maconi (R)	Clubb Racing Inc.	Ford	95	0	Running	80
15	14	99	Michael Maples	Maples Motorsports	Chevrolet	95	0	Running	79
16	11	10	Ed Pompa	Fast Track Racing	Chevrolet	94	0	Running	28
17	13	03	Alex Clubb	Clubb Racing Inc.	Ford	93	0	Running	77
18	27	32	Charles Weslowski Jr.	Weslowski Racing	Chevrolet	92	0	Running	26
19	17	48	Brad Smith	Brad Smith Motorsports	Ford	92	0	Running	75
20	20	9	Landon S. Huffman	CR7 Motorsports	Chevrolet	88	2	Accident	25
21	3	20	Jake Bollman (R)	Nitro Motorsports	Toyota	58	0	Running	73
22	24	81	Kevin Campbell	KC Motorsports	Chevrolet	49	0	Mechanical	22
23	22	69	Will Kimmel	Kimmel Racing	Ford	40	0	Accident	21
24	15	06	Nate Moeller	Wayne Peterson Motorsports	Chevrolet	40	0	Mechanical	20
25	7	91	Austin Vaughn	Maples Motorsports	Ford	39	0	Accident	19
26	26	83	Brayton Laster	Clubb Racing Inc.	Ford	22	0	Mechanical	18
27	19	15	Landon Brown	Nitro Motorsports	Toyota	0	0	Mechanical	17
Official race results

=== Race statistics ===
- Lead changes: 6 among 3 different drivers
- Cautions/Laps: 6 for 37 laps
- Red flags: 0
- Time of race: 1 hour, 36 minutes and 0 seconds
- Average speed: 93.750 miles per hour (150.876 km/h)

== Standings after the race ==
Drivers' Championship standings

	Pos	Driver	Points
1	1	Thomas Annunziata	947
1	2	Jake Bollman	947 (–0)
	3	Isabella Robusto	814 (–133)
1	4	Takuma Koga	753 (–194)
1	5	Jason Kitzmiller	736 (–211)
1	6	Michael Maples	687 (–260)
1	7	Alex Clubb	686 (–261)
3	8	Carson Brown	600 (–347)
1	9	Brad Smith	600 (–347)
	10	Jeff Maconi	594 (–353)

- Note: Only the first 10 positions are included for the driver standings.

Previous race: 2026 Bush's Best 200	ARCA Menards Series; 2026 season	Next race: 2027 General Tire 200
