= 2026 Desert Diamond Casino West Valley 100 =

ARCA Menards Series West race at Phoenix Raceway

Race details
- Race 12 of 13 in the 2026 ARCA Menards Series West
- Date: October 17, 2026
- Location: Phoenix Raceway in Avondale, Arizona
- Course: Permanent racing facility
- Course length: 1.000 miles (1.609 km)
- Distance: 114 laps, 114 mi (183.465 km)
- Scheduled distance: 100 laps, 100 mi (160.934 km)
- Average speed: 77.246 miles per hour (124.315 km/h)

Pole position
Driver	Max Reaves	Joe Gibbs Racing
- Time: 27.683

Most laps led
Driver	Max Reaves	Joe Gibbs Racing
- Laps: 90

Fastest lap
Driver	Max Reaves	Joe Gibbs Racing
- Time: 28.540

Winner
No. 18	Max Reaves	Joe Gibbs Racing

Television in the United States
- Network: FloRacing
- Announcers: Charles Krall

Radio in the United States
- Radio: ARN

The 2026 Desert Diamond Casino West Valley 100 was an ARCA Menards Series West race held on Saturday, October 17, 2026, at Phoenix Raceway in Avondale, Arizona. Contested over 114 laps—extended from 100 laps due to an overtime finish with eventual rain showers on the 1.000-mile (1.609 km) oval, it was the twelfth race of the 2026 ARCA Menards Series West season, and the 54th running of the event.

Max Reaves, driving for Joe Gibbs Racing, survived multiple late restarts and dominated the majority of the event, leading a race-high 90 laps to earn his first career ARCA Menards Series West win. Rain showers began rolling in after the race went into overtime, forcing ARCA officials to end the race without resuming, securing Reaves the win. Taylor Reimer finished second, and Mason Massey finished third. Gavan Boschele and Kasey Kleyn rounded out the top five, while Hailie Deegan, Trevor Huddleston, Mia Lovell, Jade Avedisian, and Robbie Kennealy rounded out the top ten.

This was also the final ARCA-sanctioned race for JGR, as they announced on October 1 that they would cease operations in the ARCA Menards Series following this event to put more resources into the NASCAR O'Reilly Auto Parts Series.

== Report ==
=== Background ===
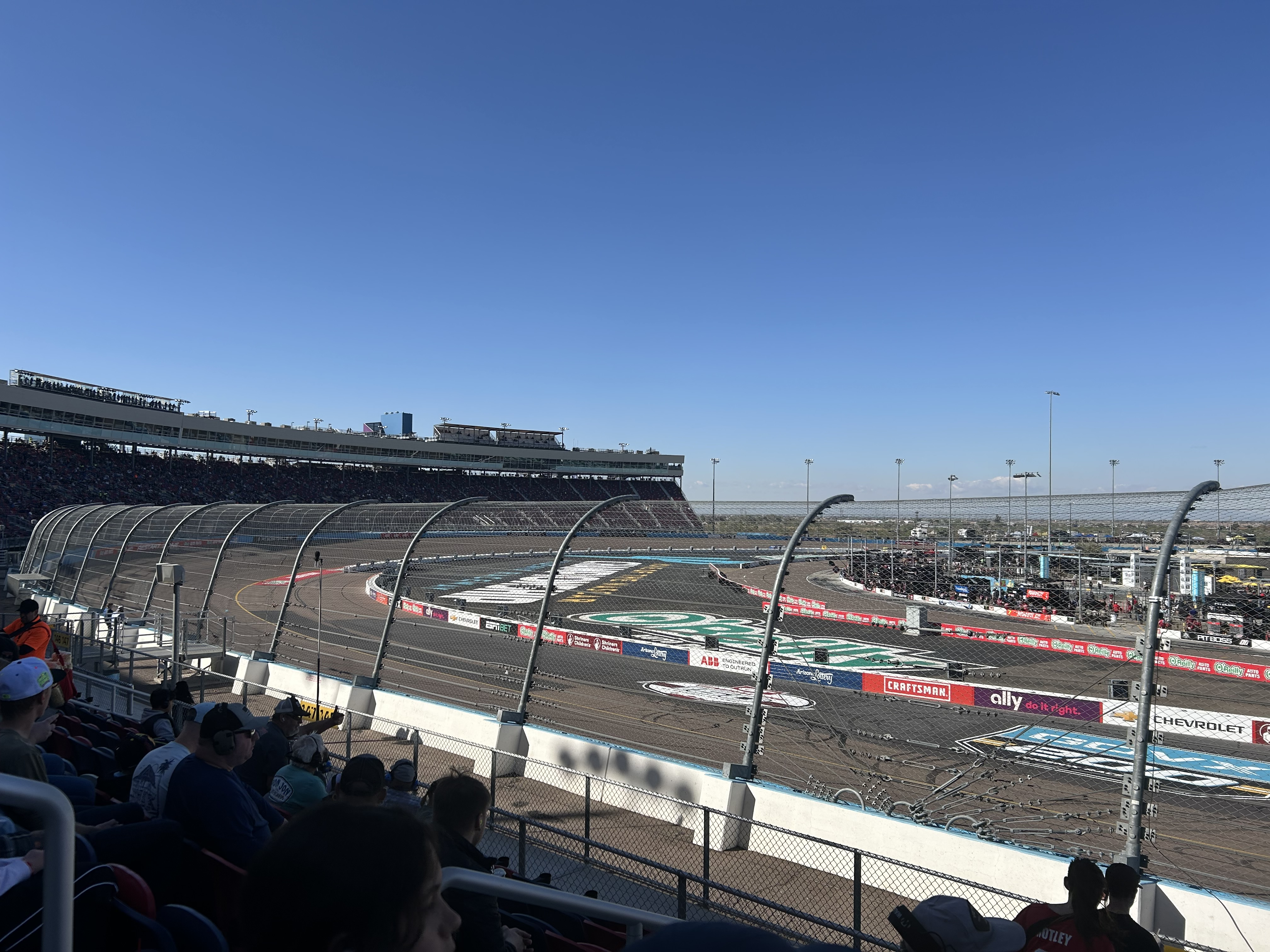
Phoenix Raceway, the track where the race was held.

Phoenix Raceway – also known as PIR – is a one-mile, low-banked tri-oval race track located in Avondale, Arizona. It is named after the nearby metropolitan area of Phoenix. The motorsport track opened in 1964 and currently hosts two NASCAR race weekends annually. PIR has also hosted the IndyCar Series, CART, USAC and the Rolex Sports Car Series. The raceway is currently owned and operated by International Speedway Corporation.

The raceway was originally constructed with a 2.5 mi (4.0 km) road course that ran both inside and outside of the main tri-oval. In 1991, the track was reconfigured with the current 1.51 mi (2.43 km) interior layout. PIR has an estimated grandstand seating capacity of around 67,000. Lights were installed around the track in 2004 following the addition of a second annual NASCAR race weekend.

Phoenix Raceway is home to two annual NASCAR race weekends, one of 13 facilities on the NASCAR schedule to host more than one race weekend a year. The track is both the first and last stop in the western United States, as well as the fourth, and hosts the championship race on the schedule. In 2026, Homestead-Miami would host the championship race, while Phoenix would retain its second date in October.

==== Entry list ====
- (R) denotes rookie driver.

#	Driver	Team	Make
1	Robbie Kennealy	Jan's Towing Racing	Ford
04	Ian Wood	Kart Idaho Racing	Toyota
05	David Smith	Shockwave Motorsports	Toyota
5	Eric Johnson Jr.	Jerry Pitts Racing	Toyota
7	Gavin Ray (R)	Jerry Pitts Racing	Toyota
10	Landon Brown	Nitro Motorsports	Toyota
15	Mia Lovell (R)	Nitro Motorsports	Toyota
16	Hailie Deegan	Bill McAnally Racing	Chevrolet
17	Taylor Mayhew	Cook Racing Technologies	Chevrolet
18	Max Reaves	Joe Gibbs Racing	Toyota
19	Mason Massey	Bill McAnally Racing	Chevrolet
20	Kasey Kleyn	Nitro Motorsports	Toyota
25	Gavan Boschele	Nitro Motorsports	Toyota
28	Helio Meza	Pinnacle Racing Group	Chevrolet
37	Esteban Rodríguez	MCM Racing Development	Toyota
38	Ray Bolinger	Kart Idaho Racing	Toyota
41	Quinn Davis	Jan's Towing Racing	Ford
50	Trevor Huddleston	High Point Racing	Ford
51	Cassten Everidge	Strike Mamba Racing	Chevrolet
55	Andrew Chapman (R)	High Point Racing	Ford
63	Sam Corry	Spraker Racing Enterprises	Chevrolet
66	Dystany Spurlock	MBM Motorsports	Toyota
70	Jade Avedisian	Nitro Motorsports	Toyota
71	Cole Denton (R)	Jan's Towing Racing	Ford
72	Cody Dennison	Strike Mamba Racing	Chevrolet
82	Taylor Reimer	Pinnacle Racing Group	Chevrolet
90	Wesley Slimp	Nitro Motorsports	Toyota
Official entry list

== Practice ==
The first and only practice session was held on Friday, October 16, at 7:30 PM MST, and lasted for 45 minutes.

Jade Avedisian, driving for Nitro Motorsports, set the fastest time in the session, with a lap of 28.574 seconds, and a speed of 125.989 miles per hour (202.760 km/h).

=== Practice results ===
Pos.	#	Driver	Team	Make	Time	Speed
1	70	Jade Avedisian	Nitro Motorsports	Toyota	28.574	125.989
2	82	Taylor Reimer	Pinnacle Racing Group	Chevrolet	28.598	125.883
3	20	Kasey Kleyn	Nitro Motorsports	Toyota	28.729	125.309
Full practice results

== Qualifying ==
Qualifying was held on Friday, October 16, at 8:30 PM MST. The qualifying procedure used was a single-car, two-lap system with one round. Drivers were on track by themselves and had two laps to post a qualifying time, and whoever set the fastest time won the pole.

Max Reaves, driving for Joe Gibbs Racing, qualified on pole position with a lap of 27.683 seconds, and a speed of 130.044 miles per hour (209.286 km/h).

=== Qualifying results ===
Pos.	#	Driver	Team	Make	Time	Speed
1	18	Max Reaves	Joe Gibbs Racing	Toyota	27.683	130.044
2	70	Jade Avedisian	Nitro Motorsports	Toyota	27.695	129.987
3	82	Taylor Reimer	Pinnacle Racing Group	Chevrolet	27.850	129.264
4	25	Gavan Boschele	Nitro Motorsports	Toyota	28.050	128.342
5	15	Mia Lovell (R)	Nitro Motorsports	Toyota	28.125	128.000
6	19	Mason Massey	Bill McAnally Racing	Chevrolet	28.170	127.796
7	20	Kasey Kleyn	Nitro Motorsports	Toyota	28.182	127.741
8	16	Hailie Deegan	Bill McAnally Racing	Chevrolet	28.188	127.714
9	5	Eric Johnson Jr.	Jerry Pitts Racing	Toyota	28.286	127.271
10	17	Taylor Mayhew	Cook Racing Technologies	Chevrolet	28.347	126.998
11	10	Landon Brown	Nitro Motorsports	Toyota	28.363	126.926
12	50	Trevor Huddleston	High Point Racing	Ford	28.399	126.765
13	71	Cole Denton (R)	Jan's Towing Racing	Ford	28.403	126.747
14	1	Robbie Kennealy	Jan's Towing Racing	Ford	28.556	126.068
15	7	Gavin Ray (R)	Jerry Pitts Racing	Toyota	28.608	125.839
16	63	Sam Corry	Spraker Racing Enterprises	Chevrolet	29.779	125.091
17	90	Wesley Slimp	Nitro Motorsports	Toyota	29.029	124.014
18	41	Quinn Davis	Jan's Towing Racing	Ford	29.102	123.703
19	55	Andrew Chapman (R)	High Point Racing	Ford	29.118	123.635
20	37	Esteban Rodríguez	MCM Racing Development	Toyota	29.152	123.491
21	51	Cassten Everidge	Strike Mamba Racing	Chevrolet	29.249	123.081
22	66	Dystany Spurlock	MBM Motorsports	Toyota	29.401	122.445
23	04	Ian Wood	Kart Idaho Racing	Toyota	30.231	119.083
24	05	David Smith	Shockwave Motorsports	Toyota	31.624	113.838
25	38	Ray Bolinger	Kart Idaho Racing	Toyota	33.002	109.084
26	72	Cody Dennison	Strike Mamba Racing	Chevrolet	—	—
27	28	Helio Meza	Pinnacle Racing Group	Chevrolet	—	—
Official qualifying results

== Race ==
=== Race results ===
Laps: 114

Fin	St	#	Driver	Team	Make	Laps	Led	Status	Pts
1	1	18	Max Reaves	Joe Gibbs Racing	Toyota	114	90	Running	49
2	3	82	Taylor Reimer	Pinnacle Racing Group	Chevrolet	114	24	Running	43
3	6	19	Mason Massey	Bill McAnally Racing	Chevrolet	114	0	Running	41
4	4	25	Gavan Boschele	Nitro Motorsports	Toyota	114	0	Running	40
5	7	20	Kasey Kleyn	Nitro Motorsports	Toyota	114	0	Running	39
6	8	16	Hailie Deegan	Bill McAnally Racing	Chevrolet	114	0	Running	38
7	12	50	Trevor Huddleston	High Point Racing	Ford	114	0	Running	37
8	5	15	Mia Lovell (R)	Nitro Motorsports	Toyota	114	0	Running	36
9	2	70	Jade Avedisian	Nitro Motorsports	Toyota	114	0	Running	35
10	14	1	Robbie Kennealy	Jan's Towing Racing	Ford	114	0	Running	34
11	16	63	Sam Corry	Spraker Racing Enterprises	Chevrolet	114	0	Running	33
12	15	7	Gavin Ray (R)	Jerry Pitts Racing	Toyota	114	0	Running	32
13	10	17	Taylor Mayhew	Cook Racing Technologies	Chevrolet	114	0	Running	31
14	22	66	Dystany Spurlock	MBM Motorsports	Toyota	114	0	Running	30
15	13	71	Cole Denton (R)	Jan's Towing Racing	Ford	114	0	Running	29
16	9	5	Eric Johnson Jr.	Jerry Pitts Racing	Toyota	113	0	Running	28
17	11	10	Landon Brown	Nitro Motorsports	Toyota	113	0	Running	27
18	17	90	Wesley Slimp	Nitro Motorsports	Toyota	112	0	Running	26
19	21	51	Cassten Everidge	Strike Mamba Racing	Chevrolet	111	0	Running	25
20	23	04	Ian Wood	Kart Idaho Racing	Toyota	110	0	Running	24
21	26	72	Cody Dennison	Strike Mamba Racing	Chevrolet	109	0	Running	23
22	24	05	David Smith	Shockwave Motorsports	Toyota	108	0	Running	22
23	27	28	Helio Meza	Pinnacle Racing Group	Chevrolet	105	0	Accident	21
24	19	55	Andrew Chapman (R)	High Point Racing	Ford	96	0	Accident	20
25	20	37	Esteban Rodríguez	MCM Racing Development	Toyota	70	0	Running	19
26	18	41	Quinn Davis	Jan's Towing Racing	Ford	65	0	Accident	18
27	25	38	Ray Bolinger	Kart Idaho Racing	Toyota	20	0	Mechanical	17
Official race results

=== Race statistics ===
- Lead changes: 4 among 2 different drivers
- Cautions/Laps: 6 for 37 laps
- Red flags: 0
- Time of race: 1 hour, 35 minutes and 3 seconds
- Average speed: 77.246 miles per hour (124.315 km/h)

== Standings after the race ==
Drivers' Championship standings

	Pos	Driver	Points
	1	Trevor Huddleston	596
1	2	Mason Massey	557 (–39)
1	3	Robbie Kennealy	553 (–43)
1	4	Hailie Deegan	531 (–65)
1	5	Cole Denton	525 (–71)
	6	Eric Johnson Jr.	518 (–78)
	7	Andrew Chapman	490 (–106)
	8	Mia Lovell	485 (–111)
	9	Gavin Ray	481 (–115)
	10	David Smith	420 (–176)

- Note: Only the first 10 positions are included for the driver standings.

Previous race: 2026 Kyle Busch Classic	ARCA Menards Series West; 2026 season	Next race: 2026 NAPA Auto Parts 150 (Kern)
