= 2027 ARCA Menards Series =

75th season of US stock car racing series

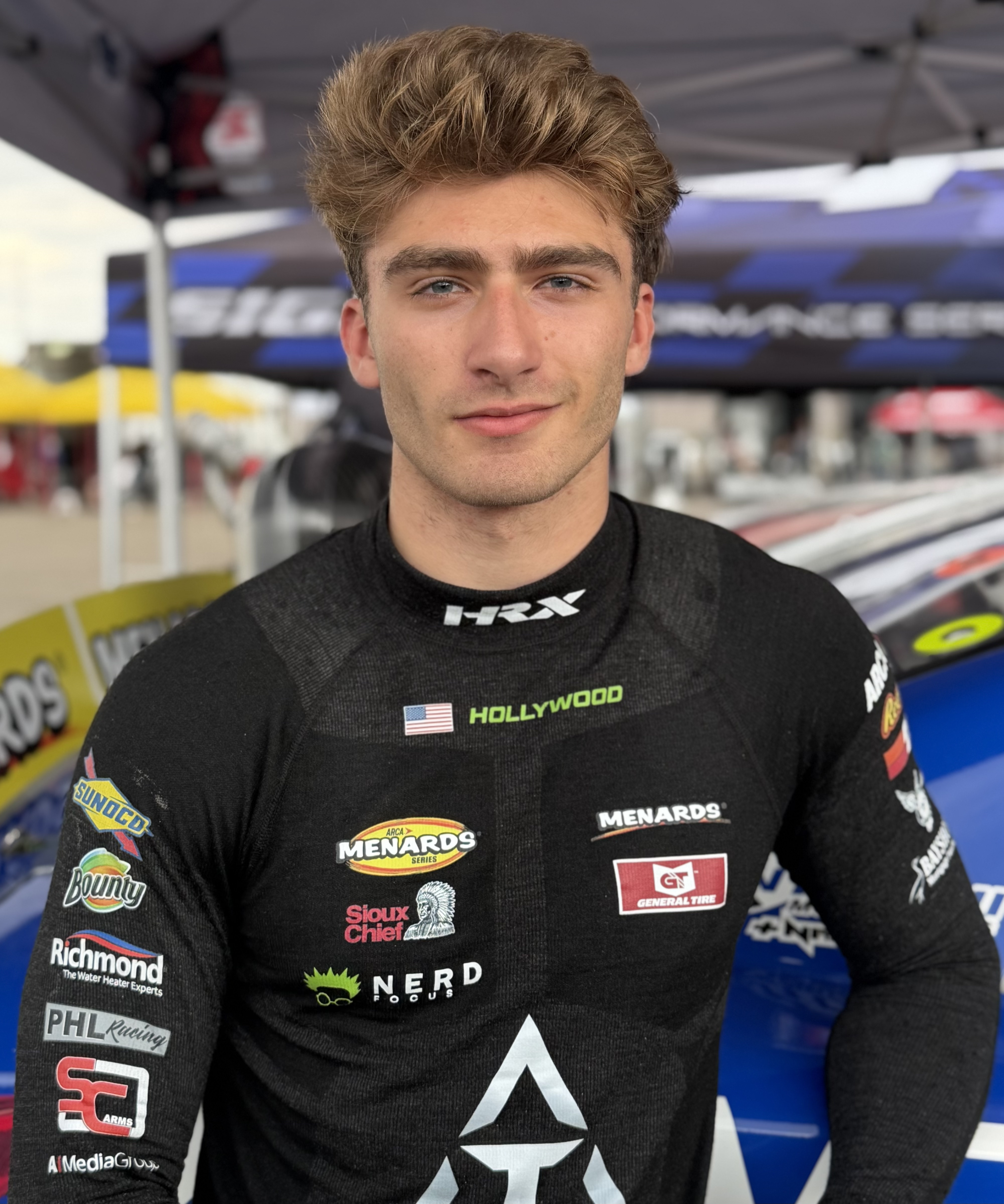
Thomas Annunziata, the reigning ARCA Menards Series champion.

The 2027 ARCA Menards Series will be the 75th season of the ARCA Menards Series, a stock car racing series sanctioned by NASCAR in the United States. The season will begin at Daytona International Speedway with the General Tire 200 on February 20 and will end with the ARCA 150 at Kansas Speedway on October 1.

Thomas Annunziata will enter at the defending series champion, although he will not compete full-time in ARCA for 2027.

During the off season, it was announced that for the 2027 season, Continental Tire will serve as the new tire supplier, replacing sister brand General Tire, who had been the previous tire supplier since 2016.

== Teams and drivers ==
=== Full schedule ===
Manufacturer	Team	No.	Driver	Crew chief	Ref
Chevrolet	ACR Motorsports	79	TBA 1	TBA	
Chevrolet	ACR Motorsports	79	Isaac Kitzmiller 19	TBA	
Chevrolet	CR7 Motorsports	97	Jason Kitzmiller	TBA	
Chevrolet	Pinnacle Racing Group	28	TBA	TBA	
Chevrolet	Pinnacle Racing Group	82	TBA	TBA	
Chevrolet	Rette Jones Racing	0	George Siciliano (R)	Mark Rette	
Chevrolet	Richard Childress Racing	33	Garrett Mitchell (R)	Robert Strmiska	
Ford	Clubb Racing Inc.	03	Alex Clubb	Brian Clubb	
Ford	Clubb Racing Inc.	86	Jeff Maconi 3	TBA	
Ford	Clubb Racing Inc.	86	TBA TBA	TBA	
Toyota	Cook Racing Technologies	17	TBA	TBA	
Toyota	Fast Track Racing	12	Takuma Koga	TBA	
Toyota	Nitro Motorsports	25	Kasey Kleyn (R)	TBA	
Toyota	Nitro Motorsports	55	Wesley Slimp (R)	TBA	
Toyota	Nitro Motorsports	70	Jake Bollman	TBA	
Toyota	Nitro Motorsports	TBA	TBA	TBA	
TBA	Brad Smith Motorsports	48	Brad Smith	TBA	

=== Limited schedule ===
Manufacturer	Team	No.	Driver	Crew chief	Races	Ref
Chevrolet	Bill McAnally Racing	TBA	Hailie Deegan	TBA	1	
Chevrolet	Cook Racing Technologies	42	Nolan Wilson	TBA	1	
Ford	Alpha Prime Racing	44	Dystany Spurlock	TBA	17	
Ford	City Garage Motorsports	85	Caleb Costner	TBA	1	
Toyota	Nitro Motorsports	TBA	Mia Lovell	TBA	1	
TBA	Greg Van Alst Motorsports	35	Ryder Van Alst	TBA	TBA	

== Schedule ==
The entire schedule was released on October 13, 2026.

- The race at Phoenix in March will be a combination race with the ARCA Menards Series West (highlighted in gold).

No	Race title	Track	Location	Date
1	General Tire 200	O Daytona International Speedway	Daytona Beach, Florida	February 20
2	General Tire 150	O Phoenix Raceway	Avondale, Arizona	March 12
3	Alabama Manufactured Housing 200	O Talladega Superspeedway	Lincoln, Alabama	April 24
4	Tide 150	O Kansas Speedway	Kansas City, Kansas	May 8
5	Owens Corning 200	O Toledo Speedway	Toledo, Ohio	May 15
6	Herr's Snacks 200	O Berlin Raceway	Marne, Michigan	June 5
7	Shore Lunch 250 Presented By Dutch Boy	O Elko Speedway	Elko New Market, Minnesota	June 12
8	Henry Ford Health 200	O Michigan International Speedway	Brooklyn, Michigan	June 18
9	Ashley Furniture 150	O Chicagoland Speedway	Joliet, Illinois	June 25
10	JR & CO. 150	O Iowa Speedway	Newton, Iowa	July 2
11	Lime Rock Park 100	R Lime Rock Park	Lakeville, Connecticut	July 10
12	LiUNA! 150 presented by IDEAL Garage Door	O Lucas Oil Indianapolis Raceway Park	Brownsburg, Indiana	July 24
13	Calypso 100	D Illinois State Fairgrounds Racetrack	Springfield, Illinois	August 8
14	Bush's Beans 200	O Bristol Motor Speedway	Bristol, Tennessee	August 12
15	TBA	O World Wide Technology Raceway	Madison, Illinois	August 20
16	Atlas 200	O Madison International Speedway	Rutland, Wisconsin	August 27
17	Audubon Park 100	D DuQuoin State Fairgrounds Racetrack	Du Quoin, Illinois	September 5
18	General Tire 100 at The Glen	R Watkins Glen International	Watkins Glen, New York	September 17
19	Spruce 212	O Salem Speedway	Salem, Indiana	September 25
20	Menards 150	O Kansas Speedway	Kansas City, Kansas	October 1

Notes:

Gateway Motorsports Park is added for the first time since 2020, replacing Pocono Raceway.

== See also ==
- 2027 NASCAR Cup Series
- 2027 NASCAR O'Reilly Auto Parts Series
- 2027 NASCAR Truck Series
- 2027 ARCA Menards Series East
- 2027 ARCA Menards Series West
- 2027 NASCAR Whelen Modified Tour
