= Ty Fredrickson =

American racing driver

- Born: March 16, 2009 (age 17); Northfield, Minnesota, U.S.

ARCA Menards Series career
- 6 races run over 2 years
- Best finish: 28th (2026)
- First race: 2025 Shore Lunch 250 (Elko)
- Last race: 2026 Bush's Best 200 (Bristol)
Wins	Top tens	Poles
0	2	0

ARCA Menards Series East career
- 2 races run over 1 year
- Best finish: 40th (2026)
- First race: 2026 JR & CO. 150 (Iowa)
- Last race: 2026 Bush's Best 200 (Bristol)
Wins	Top tens	Poles
0	0	0
- Statistics up to date as of September 26, 2026.

Ty Fredrickson (born March 16, 2009) is an American professional stock car racing driver. He last competed part-time in the ARCA Menards Series, driving the No. 25/90 Toyota for Nitro Motorsports, the No. 91 Ford for Maples Motorsports, and the No. 36 Toyota for Team 36.

== Racing career ==
Fredrickson has previously competed in series such as the ASA Midwest Tour, where he won rookie of the year honors in 2024, the ASA STARS National Tour, the ASA CRA Super Series, and the World Series of Asphalt Stock Car Racing.

In 2025, it was revealed that Fredrickson would participate in the pre-season test for the ARCA Menards Series at Daytona International Speedway, driving the No. 46 Toyota for Nitro Motorsports. Several months later, it was announced that Fredrickson would make his ARCA Menards Series debut at Elko Speedway, driving the No. 25 Toyota for Venturini Motorsports.

== Personal life ==
Fredrickson is the son of fellow racing driver Dan Fredrickson, who is a former ASA Midwest Tour champion.

== Motorsports results ==
=== Stock car career summary ===
Season	Series	Team	Races	Wins	Top 5	Top 10	Points	Position
2023	ASA STARS National Tour	Wauters Motorsports	1	0	0	0	31	88th
2024	ASA STARS National Tour	Dan Fredrickson	1	0	0	0	84	32nd
2024	ASA STARS National Tour	Wilson Motorsports	1	0	0	0	84	32nd
2025	ASA STARS National Tour	Dan Fredrickson	7	0	1	4	320	16th
2025	ARCA Menards Series	Venturini Motorsports	1	0	1	1	40	92nd
2026	ASA STARS National Tour	Dan Fredrickson	4	0	0	2		
2026	CARS Late Model Stock Car Tour	Hedgecock Racing	1	0	0	0	50	50th
2026	CARS Late Model Stock Car Tour	Matt Piercy Racing	1	0	0	0	50	50th
2026	ARCA Menards Series East	Nitro Motorsports	1	0	0	0	62	40th
2026	ARCA Menards Series East	Team 36	1	0	0	0	62	40th
2026	ARCA Menards Series	Nitro Motorsports	2	0	1	1	157	28th
2026	ARCA Menards Series	Maples Motorsports	1	0	0	0	157	28th
2026	ARCA Menards Series	Team 36	2	0	0	0	157	28th

=== ARCA Menards Series ===
(key) (Bold – Pole position awarded by qualifying time. Italics – Pole position earned by points standings or practice time. * – Most laps led. ** – All laps led.)

ARCA Menards Series results
Year	Team	No.	Make	1	2	3	4	5	6	7	8	9	10	11	12	13	14	15	16	17	18	19	20	AMSC	Pts	Ref
2025	Venturini Motorsports	25	Toyota	DAY	PHO	TAL	KAN	CLT	MCH	BLN	ELK; 4	LRP	DOV	IRP	IOW	GLN	ISF	MAD	DSF	BRI	SLM	KAN	TOL	92nd	40	
2026	Nitro Motorsports	25	Toyota	DAY	PHO	KAN	TAL	GLN	TOL	MCH	POC	BER	ELK; 3	CHI										28th	157	
2026	Maples Motorsports	91	Ford												LRP; 15	IRP								28th	157	
2026	Nitro Motorsports	90	Toyota														IOW; 12	ISF						28th	157	
2026	Team 36	36	Toyota																MAD; 19	DSF	SLM	BRI; 14	KAN	28th	157	

==== ARCA Menards Series East ====
ARCA Menards Series East results
Year	Team	No.	Make	1	2	3	4	5	6	7	8	AMSEC	Pts	Ref
2026	Nitro Motorsports	90	Toyota	HCY	CAR	NSV	TOL	IRP	FRS	IOW; 12		40th	62	
2026	Team 36	36	Toyota								BRI; 14	40th	62	

=== CARS Late Model Stock Car Tour ===
(key) (Bold – Pole position awarded by qualifying time. Italics – Pole position earned by points standings or practice time. * – Most laps led. ** – All laps led.)

CARS Late Model Stock Car Tour results
Year	Team	No.	Make	1	2	3	4	5	6	7	8	9	10	11	12	13	14	CLMSCTC	Pts	Ref
2026	Hedgecock Racing	41	Chevy	SNM	WCS	NSV	CRW	ACE	LGY	DOM	NWS; 23	HCY	AND	FLC	TCM	NPS		50th	50	
2026	Matt Piercy Racing	7	Chevy														SBO; 12	50th	50	

=== ASA STARS National Tour ===
(key) (Bold – Pole position awarded by qualifying time. Italics – Pole position earned by points standings or practice time. * – Most laps led. ** – All laps led.)

ASA STARS National Tour results
Year	Team	No.	Make	1	2	3	4	5	6	7	8	9	10	11	12	ASNTC	Pts	Ref
2023	Wauters Motorsports	5F	Toyota	FIF	MAD	NWS	HCY	MLW	AND	WIR	TOL	WIN	NSV; 21			88th	31	
2024	Dan Fredrickson	36	N/A	NSM; 21	FIF	HCY										32nd	84	
2024	Wilson Motorsports	24	N/A				MAD; 12	MLW	AND	OWO	TOL	WIN	NSV			32nd	84	
2025	Dan Fredrickson	36	Toyota	NSM; 29	FIF; 28	DOM; 8	HCY	NPS	MAD; 3	SLG; 12	AND	OWO; 7	TOL	WIN	NSV; 10	16th	320	
2026	Dan Fredrickson	36	Toyota	NSM; 22	FIF; 26	HCY; Wth	SLG; DNS	MAD; 4	NPS	OWO	TRI; 3	WIN	NSV	NSM		-*	-*	
