= Will Robinson (racing driver) =

American racing driver (born 2004)

- Robinson at Madera Speedway in 2026
- Born: John Robinson; January 27, 2004 (age 22); Wilson, Wyoming, U.S.

ARCA Menards Series career
- 3 races run over 1 year
- ARCA no., team: No. TBA (Nitro Motorsports)
- Best finish: 41st (2026)
- First race: 2026 Herr's Snacks 200 (Berlin)
- Last race: 2026 Atlas 200 (Madison)
Wins	Top tens	Poles
0	2	0

ARCA Menards Series West career
- 4 races run over 1 year
- Best finish: 21st (2026)
- First race: 2026 Tucson ARCA Menards West 150 (Tucson)
- Last race: 2026 Madera 150 (Madera)
Wins	Top tens	Poles
0	2	0
- Statistics up to date as of November 2, 2026.

John "Will" Robinson (born January 27, 2004) is an American professional sports car and stock car racing driver. He competes part-time in the ARCA Menards Series, driving a Toyota Camry for Nitro Motorsports. He previously competed in the Mazda MX-5 Cup and the Trans-Am CUBE 3 Architecture TA2 Series.

== Racing career ==
Robinson was introduced to cars at a young age after driving various vehicles at his grandparent's farm. During his teenage years, he received a ticket for speeding at a national park. Following the incident, his father connected him with fellow racing driver Chris Dyson, who encouraged him to join the Skip Barber Racing School. After earning his SCCA racing license, he began running Spec Miata events. In 2024, he moved up to the Spec MX-5 division, earning five top fives and nine top-tens during the season. That same year, he made his late model racing debut at New Smyrna Speedway, earning a top-ten in his debut. In 2025, he expanded his late model schedule, winning two races at New Smyrna in the NASCAR Advance Auto Parts Weekly Series.

=== Trans-Am Series ===
On February 20, 2025, it was announced that Robinson would run full-time in the Trans-Am TA2 Series, driving the No. 51 Ford for Mike Cope Racing. Despite missing one race at Canadian Tire Motorsport Park, he earned five top-tens throughout the season and a ninth-place points finish.

=== Mazda MX-5 Cup ===
On January 21, 2026, it was announced that Robinson will run full-time in the Mazda MX-5 Cup, driving the No. 51 for McCumbee McAleer Racing.

=== ARCA ===
==== ARCA Menards Series West ====
Robinson's No. 25 car at All American Speedway in 2026

On April 7, 2026, it was revealed that Robinson would make his ARCA Menards Series West debut at Tucson Speedway, driving the No. 70 Toyota for Nitro Motorsports in a collaboration with Jerry Pitts Racing. After qualifying 13th, he finished 16th after an early incident. He made his second start of the season at Colorado National Speedway, this time running the No. 25 for Nitro, earning a 13th-place effort.

==== ARCA Menards Series ====
On June 16, 2026, it was revealed that Robinson will make his debut in the main ARCA Menards Series, driving the No. 25 for Nitro at Berlin Raceway. He qualified and finished seventh in his debut. He made his second start at Lime Rock Park, finishing 12th after starting 15th.

== Personal life ==
Robinson currently attends Stetson University, studying in marketing. He grew up as a ski racer and also enjoys snowmobiling and riding a dirt bike in his free time.

== Motorsports career results ==
=== Stock car career summary ===
Season	Series	Team	Races	Wins	Top 5	Top 10	Points	Position
2026	ARCA Menards Series West	Nitro Motorsports	4	0	1	2	134	21st
2026	ARCA Menards Series	Nitro Motorsports	3	0	0	2	105	41st

=== ARCA Menards Series ===
(key) (Bold – Pole position awarded by qualifying time. Italics – Pole position earned by points standings or practice time. * – Most laps led. ** – All laps led.)

ARCA Menards Series results
Year	Team	No.	Make	1	2	3	4	5	6	7	8	9	10	11	12	13	14	15	16	17	18	19	20	AMSC	Pts	Ref
2026	Nitro Motorsports	25	Toyota	DAY	PHO	KAN	TAL	GLN	TOL	MCH	POC	BER; 7	ELK	CHI					MAD; 8	DSF	SLM	BRI	KAN	41st	105	
2026	Nitro Motorsports	15	Toyota												LRP; 12	IRP	IOW	ISF						41st	105	

==== ARCA Menards Series West ====
ARCA Menards Series West results
Year	Team	No.	Make	1	2	3	4	5	6	7	8	9	10	11	12	13	AMSWC	Pts	Ref
2026	Nitro Motorsports	70	Toyota	KER	PHO	TUC; 16	SHA										21st	134	
2026	Nitro Motorsports	25	Toyota					CNS; 13	TRI	SON	PIR	AAS; 5	MAD; 8	LVS	PHO	KER	21st	134	

^{*} Season still in progress
