= Nitro Motorsports =

American stock car racing team

- Owner(s): Nick Tucker; Joe Tovo
- Base: Concord, North Carolina
- Series: ARCA Menards Series; ARCA Menards Series East; ARCA Menards Series West; Trans-Am Series
- Race drivers: ARCA Menards Series: 15. TBA; 20. TBA; 25. Kasey Kleyn (R); 55. Wesley Slimp (R); 70. Jake Bollman; 90. TBA; ARCA Menards Series East: 15. TBA; 20. TBA; 25. Kasey Kleyn (part-time); 55. Wesley Slimp (part-time); 70. Jake Bollman (part-time); 90. TBA; ARCA Menards Series West: 10. TBA; 15. TBA; 20. TBA; 25. Kasey Kleyn (part-time); 55. Wesley Slimp (part-time); 70. Jake Bollman(part-time); 90. TBA
- Manufacturer: Toyota

Career
- Debut: 2025
- Latest race: ARCA Menards Series: 2026 Menards 150 (Kansas); ARCA Menards Series East: 2026 Bush's Best 200 (Bristol); ARCA Menards Series West: 2026 NAPA Auto Parts 150 (Bakersfield)
- Races competed: Total: 66; ARCA Menards Series: 40; ARCA Menards Series East: 10; ARCA Menards Series West: 16
- Drivers' Championships: Total: 1 ARCA Menards Series: 1 ARCA Menards Series East: 0 ARCA Menards Series West: 0
- Race victories: Total: 5 ARCA Menards Series: 4 ARCA Menards Series East: 0 ARCA Menards Series West: 1
- Pole positions: Total: 9 ARCA Menards Series: 5 ARCA Menards Series East: 0 ARCA Menards Series West: 4

Nitro Motorsports is an American professional auto racing team that currently competes in the ARCA Menards Series and the Trans-Am Series with the Trans-Am TA2 class. The team bought and operates the remains of Venturini Motorsports, in which they also operate from their former race shop in Concord, North Carolina.

== History ==
Nitro Motorsports was formed by Nick Tucker, a former NASCAR driver in the NASCAR Craftsman Truck Series and the ARCA Menards Series. Tucker founded the racing team in 2016 as Nitro Kart, where it would become one of the most successful karting brands in North America and in the Trans-Am Series in the TA2 class in 2021 winning the 2023 and 2024 championships with Brent Crews and Raphael Matos respectively. On November 27, 2024, the team announced they would collaborate with Venturini Motorsports to be in the ARCA Menards Series for 2025.

On April 18, 2025, it was announced that Venturini Motorsports would be sold to the team after the 2025 season.

== ARCA Menards Series ==
=== Car No. 15 history ===
On January 13, 2026, it was announced that Jake Finch will drive the No. 15 Toyota at Daytona and Talladega. Mia Lovell would drive the No. 15 at Phoenix for the West Series double header. Jade Avedisian would drive the No. 15 at Kansas, Pocono, Chicagoland, Iowa, and Bristol. Sam Corry would drive the No. 15 at Watkins Glen. Wesley Slimp would drive the No. 15 at Michigan. Will Robinson would drive the No. 15 at Lime Rock. Ashton Higgins would drive the No. 15 at IRP for the East Series double header. Landon Brown would drive the No. 15 at Kansas.

==== Car No. 15 results ====
Year	Driver	No.	Make	1	2	3	4	5	6	7	8	9	10	11	12	13	14	15	16	17	18	19	20	AMSC	Pts
2026	Jake Finch	15	Toyota	DAY; 20*			TAL; 12																	20th	463
2026	Mia Lovell	15	Toyota		PHO; 30																			20th	463
2026	Jade Avedisian	15	Toyota			KAN; 7					POC; 8	BER	ELK	CHI; 6			IOW; 10	ISF	MAD	DSF	SLM	BRI; 7		20th	463
2026	Sam Corry	15	Toyota					GLN; 5	TOL															20th	463
2026	Wesley Slimp	15	Toyota							MCH; 9														20th	463
2026	Will Robinson	15	Toyota												LRP; 12									20th	463
2026	Ashton Higgins	15	Toyota													IRP; 8								20th	463
2026	Landon Brown	15	Toyota																				KAN; 27	20th	463

=== Car No. 20 history ===
On January 27, 2026, it was announced that Jake Bollman will run full-time in the No. 20 Toyota in the ARCA Menards Series.

==== Car No. 20 results ====
Year	Driver	No.	Make	1	2	3	4	5	6	7	8	9	10	11	12	13	14	15	16	17	18	19	20	AMSC	Pts
2026	Jake Bollman	20	Toyota	DAY; 2	PHO; 6	KAN; 3	TAL; 18	GLN; 10	TOL; 4	MCH; 2	POC; 4	BER; 3	ELK; 2	CHI; 8	LRP; 5	IRP; 7	IOW; 3	ISF; 6	MAD; 4	DSF; 2	SLM; 2	BRI; 6	KAN; 21	5th	947

=== Car No. 25 history ===
In December 2025, it was announced that Gavan Boschele will compete in fifteen races for the team in the ARCA Menards Series in 2026. On January 21, 2026, it was announced that Gus Dean will drive the No. 25 Toyota at Daytona and Talladega. Julian DaCosta would drive the No. 25 at Phoenix for the West Series double header. Wesley Slimp would drive the No. 25 at Toledo for the East Series double header. Will Robinson would drive the No. 25 at Berlin and Madison. Ty Fredrickson would drive the No. 25 at Elko. Peter Portante would make his ARCA debut at Lime Rock.

On November 12, 2026, it was announced that Kasey Kleyn would drive the No. 25 full-time in 2027.

==== Car No. 25 results ====
Year	Driver	No.	Make	1	2	3	4	5	6	7	8	9	10	11	12	13	14	15	16	17	18	19	20	AMSC	Pts
2026	Gus Dean	25	Toyota	DAY; 29			TAL; 3																	6th	917
2026	Julian DaCosta	25	Toyota		PHO; 31																			6th	917
2026	Gavan Boschele	25	Toyota			KAN; 3		GLN; 4		MCH; 3	POC; 2			CHI; 12		IRP; 4	IOW; 6	ISF; 5		DSF; 4	SLM; 8	BRI; 13	KAN; 3	6th	917
2026	Wesley Slimp	25	Toyota						TOL; 8															6th	917
2026	Will Robinson	25	Toyota									BER; 7							MAD; 8					6th	917
2026	Ty Fredrickson	25	Toyota										ELK; 3											6th	917
2026	Peter Portante	25	Toyota												LRP; 11									6th	917

=== Car No. 46 history ===
On January 7, 2025, it was announced that Thad Moffitt will drive the No. 46 car full-time. After six races, Moffitt was reduced to part-time due to a sponsor withdrawal.

==== Car No. 46 results ====
Year	Driver	No.	Make	1	2	3	4	5	6	7	8	9	10	11	12	13	14	15	16	17	18	19	20	AMSC	Pts
2025	Thad Moffitt	46	Toyota	DAY; 37	PHO; 7	TAL; 2	KAN; 16	CLT; 7	MCH; 6	BLN	ELK	LRP	DOV	IRP; 10	IOW	GLN	ISF	MAD	DSF	BRI	SLM	KAN; 7	TOL	35th	114

=== Car No. 55 history ===
On December 10, 2025, it was announced that Isabella Robusto would drive the No. 55 Toyota for her sophomore ARCA Menards Series season in 2026.

On November 17, 2026, it was announced that Wesley Slimp will drive the No. 55 full-time for the 2027 season.

==== Car No. 55 results ====
Year	Driver	No.	Make	1	2	3	4	5	6	7	8	9	10	11	12	13	14	15	16	17	18	19	20	AMSC	Pts
2026	Isabella Robusto	55	Toyota	DAY; 37	PHO; 21	KAN; 22	TAL; 4	GLN; 6	TOL; 6	MCH; 7	POC; 13	BER; 5	ELK; 6	CHI; 13	LRP; 25	IRP; 30	IOW; 11	ISF; 8	MAD; 7	DSF; 14	SLM; 5	BRI; 20	KAN; 8	8th	814

=== Car No. 70 history ===
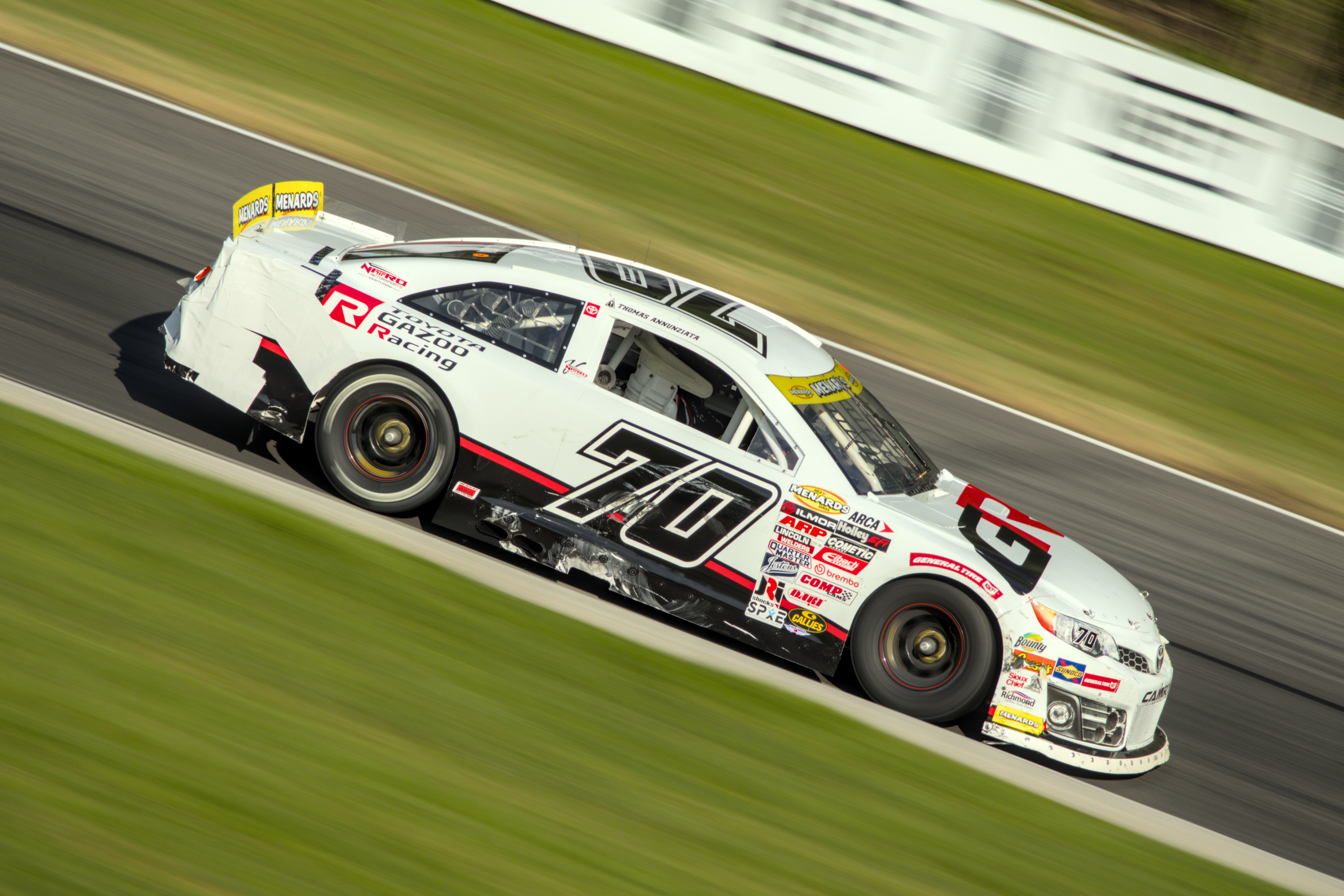
Thomas Annunziata driving the No. 70 car at Lime Rock Park in 2025

On January 9, 2025, it was announced that Amber Balcaen will drive the No. 70 car part-time. The team signed Treyten Lapcevich to a one-race deal at Berlin Raceway after Thad Moffitt was reduced to part-time. Lapcevich ended up winning the team’s first ARCA pole and win in his appearance. For Lime Rock Park, the team signed Thomas Annunziata, where he would earn the team's second pole and also earned the team's second win. Camden Murphy would make his debut in the ARCA Menards Series at Dover Motor Speedway, driving the No. 70 car. Sam Corry would make his debut in the ARCA Menards Series at Lucas Oil Indianapolis Raceway Park in the No. 70 car. Thad Moffitt would drive the No. 70 car at Watkins Glen. Brent Crews drove the No. 70 car at Springfield and DuQuoin. He won the race at Springfield. Julian DaCosta drove the No. 70 to a fifth place finish Madison. On September 16, it was revealed that Andrew Patterson would drive the No. 70 Toyota at Salem Speedway. He went on to finish second behind eventual race winner Brenden Queen. Justin Rothberg drove the No. 70 at Toledo.

In 2026, Annunziata will run full-time in the main ARCA Menards Series, driving the No. 70 Toyota. He scored back to back pole positions at Berlin and Elko before scored his first win of the season at Lime Rock. He scored enough points to win 2026 ARCA Menards Series championship on a tiebreaker with his teammate Jake Bollman.

On November 10, 2026, it was announced that Bollman would move from the No. 20 to the No. 70, replacing Annunziata for the 2027 season.

==== Car No. 70 results ====
Year	Driver	No.	Make	1	2	3	4	5	6	7	8	9	10	11	12	13	14	15	16	17	18	19	20	AMSC	Pts
2025	Amber Balcaen	70	Toyota	DAY; 29	PHO	TAL; 16	KAN	CLT	MCH															6th	915
2025	Treyten Lapcevich	70	Toyota							BLN; 1**														6th	915
2025	Taylor Reimer	70	Toyota								ELK; 8											KAN; 5		6th	915
2025	Thomas Annunziata	70	Toyota									LRP; 1*								BRI; 5				6th	915
2025	Camden Murphy	70	Toyota										DOV; 2											6th	915
2025	Sam Corry	70	Toyota											IRP; 13	IOW; 7									6th	915
2025	Thad Moffitt	70	Toyota													GLN; 15								6th	915
2025	Brent Crews	70	Toyota														ISF; 1*		DSF; 15*					6th	915
2025	Julian DaCosta	70	Toyota															MAD; 5						6th	915
2025	Andrew Patterson	70	Toyota																		SLM; 2			6th	915
2025	Justin Rothberg	70	Toyota																				TOL; 17	6th	915
2026	Thomas Annunziata	70	Toyota	DAY; 26	PHO; 3	KAN; 9	TAL; 26	GLN; 5	TOL; 2	MCH; 6	POC; 6	BER; 2	ELK; 7	CHI; 5	LRP; 1*	IRP; 4	IOW; 7	ISF; 3	MAD; 5	DSF; 5	SLM; 7	BRI; 9	KAN; 5	4th	917

=== Car No. 90 history ===
In 2026, it was revealed that Wesley Slimp would participate in the pre-season test for the ARCA Menards Series at Daytona International Speedway, driving the No. 90 Toyota for the team Later on, it was announced that he will run five ARCA races for the team. Jade Avedisian would drive the No. 90 at Phoenix for the West Series double header. Ty Fredrickson would drive the No. 90 at Iowa.

==== Car No. 90 results ====
Year	Driver	No.	Make	1	2	3	4	5	6	7	8	9	10	11	12	13	14	15	16	17	18	19	20	AMSC	Pts
2026	Wesley Slimp	90	Toyota	DAY; 35																				52nd	57
2026	Jade Avedisian	90	Toyota		PHO; 28	KAN	TAL	GLN	TOL	MCH	POC	BER	ELK	CHI	LRP	IRP								52nd	57
2026	Ty Fredrickson	90	Toyota														IOW; 12	ISF	MAD	DSF	SLM	BRI	KAN	52nd	57

== ARCA Menards Series East ==
=== Car No. 15 history ===
In 2026, the team fieded the No. 15 for Ashton Higgins for the double headers events at IRP. Jade Avedisian would drive the No. 15 for the double headers events at Iowa.

==== Car No. 15 results ====
Year	Driver	No.	Make	1	2	3	4	5	6	7	8	Owners	Pts
2026	Ashton Higgins	15	Toyota	HCY	CAR	NSV	TOL	IRP; 8	FRS			26th	107
2026	Jade Avedisian	15	Toyota							IOW; 10	BRI; 7	26th	107

=== Car No. 20 history ===
In 2026, the team fieded the No. 20 for Jake Bollman for the double headers events at Toledo, IRP, Iowa, and Bristol.

==== Car No. 20 results ====
Year	Driver	No.	Make	1	2	3	4	5	6	7	8	Owners	Pts
2026	Jake Bollman	20	Toyota	HCY	CAR	NSV	TOL; 2	IRP; 7	FRS	IOW; 3	BRI; 6	21st	156

=== Car No. 25 history ===
In 2026, the team fielded the No. 25 Toyota Camry part-time for Gavan Boschele and Wesley Slimp.

==== Car No. 25 results ====
Year	Driver	No.	Make	1	2	3	4	5	6	7	8	Owners	Pts
2026	Gavan Boschele	25	Toyota	HCY	ROC; 20	NSV		IRP; 4	FRS	IOW; 6	BRI; 13	20th	169
2026	Wesley Slimp	25	Toyota				TOL; 8					20th	169

=== Car No. 46 history ===
In 2025, the team fielded the No. 46 Toyota Camry for Thad Moffitt at IRP.

==== Car No. 46 results ====
Year	Driver	No.	Make	1	2	3	4	5	6	7	8	Owners	Pts
2025	Thad Moffitt	46	Toyota	FIF	CAR	NSV	FRS	DOV	IRP; 10	IOW	BRI	42nd	34

=== Car No. 55 history ===
In 2026, the team fieded the No. 55 for Isabella Robusto for the double headers events at Toledo, IRP, Iowa, and Bristol.

==== Car No. 55 results ====
Year	Driver	No.	Make	1	2	3	4	5	6	7	8	Owners	Pts
2026	Isabella Robusto	55	Toyota	HCY	CAR	NSV	TOL; 6	IRP; 30	FRS	IOW; 11	BRI; 20	25th	109

=== Car No. 70 history ===
In 2025, the team fielded the No. 70 Toyota Camry part-time in the ARCA Menards Series East with Camden Murphy, Sam Corry, and Thomas Annunziata.

In 2026, owner Nick Tucker would drive the No. 70 at season opener at Hickory. Wesley Slimp would drive the No. 70 at Rockingham. Thomas Annunziata would drive the No. 70 for the double headers events at Toledo, IRP, Iowa, and Bristol.

==== Car No. 70 results ====
Year	Driver	No.	Make	1	2	3	4	5	6	7	8	Owners	Pts
2025	Camden Murphy	70	Toyota	FIF	CAR	NSV	FRS	DOV; 2				18th	199
2025	Sam Corry	70	Toyota						IRP; 13	IOW; 7		18th	199
2025	Thomas Annunziata	70	Toyota								BRI; 5	18th	199
2026	Nick Tucker	70	Toyota	HCY; 5								14th	234
2026	Wesley Slimp	70	Toyota		ROC; 5	NSV						14th	234
2026	Thomas Annunziata	70	Toyota				TOL; 2	IRP; 2	FRS	IOW; 7	BRI; 9	14th	234

=== Car No. 90 history ===
In 2026, the team partnered with Team 36 to field the No. 90 for Ty Fredrickson at Iowa and Bristol.

==== Car No. 90 results ====
Year	Driver	No.	Make	1	2	3	4	5	6	7	8	Owners	Pts
2026	Ty Fredrickson	90	Toyota	HCY	CAR	NSV	TOL	IRP	FRS	IOW; 12	BRI	44th	32

== ARCA Menards Series West ==
=== Car No. 10 history ===
On October 9, 2026, it was announced that Landon Brown would compete at Phoenix, driving the No. 10 Toyota for Nitro.

==== Car No. 10 results ====
Year	Driver	No.	Make	1	2	3	4	5	6	7	8	9	10	11	12	13	AMSWC	Pts
2026	Landon Brown	10	Toyota	KER	PHO	TUC	SHA	CNS	TRI	SON	PIR	AAS	MAD	LVS	PHO; 17	KER		

=== Car No. 15 history ===
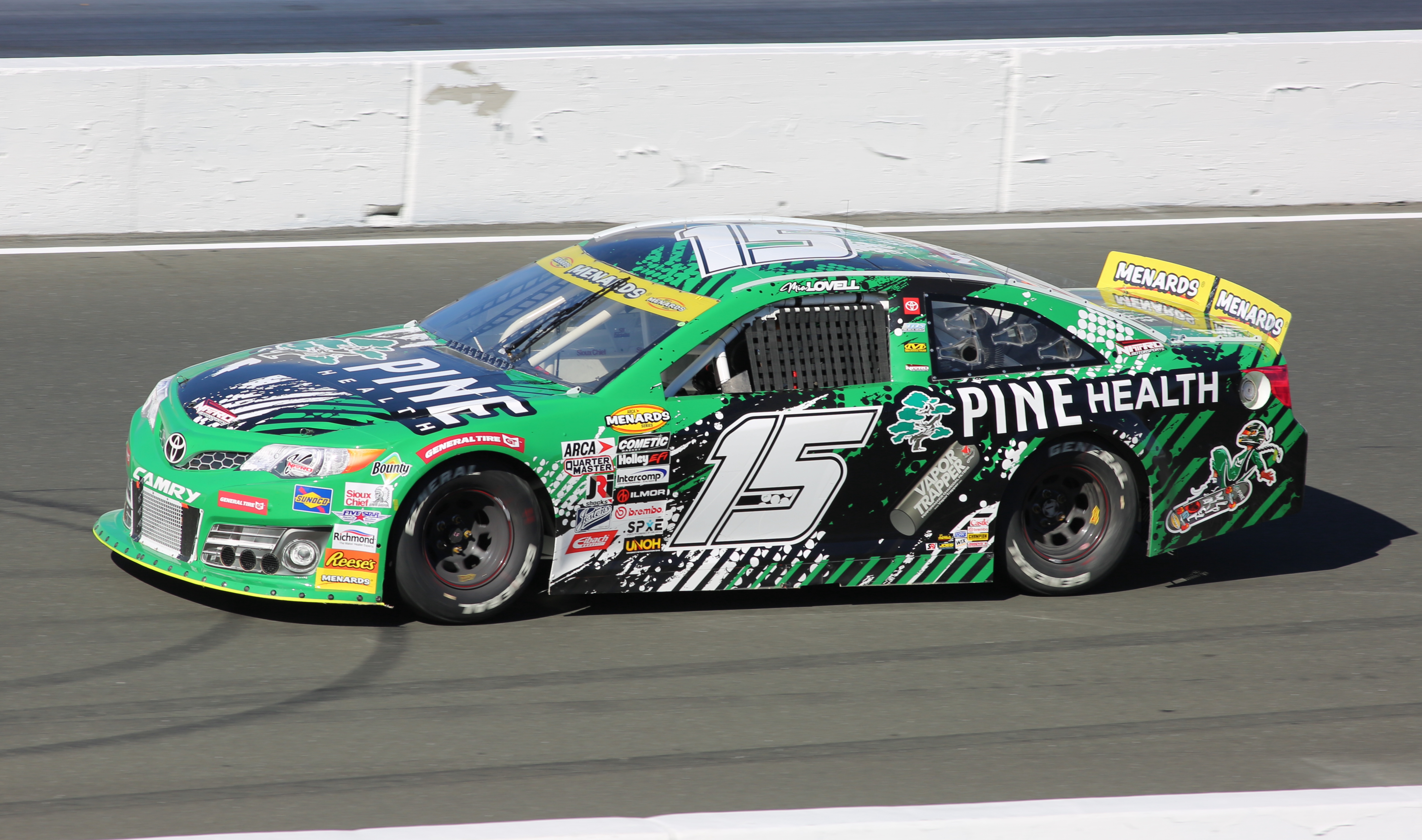
Mia Lovell in the No. 15 car at Sonoma Raceway in 2026

In 2026, the team fielded the No. 15 Toyota full-time for Mia Lovell in the ARCA Menards Series West.

==== Car No. 15 results ====
Year	Driver	No.	Make	1	2	3	4	5	6	7	8	9	10	11	12	13	AMSWC	Pts
2026	Mia Lovell	15	Toyota	KER; 12	PHO; 30	TUC; 8	SHA; 9	CNS; 6	TRI; 3	SON; 2	PIR; 11	AAS; 18	MAD; 13	LVS; 23	PHO; 8	KER; 2	7th	578

=== Car No. 20 history ===
In 2025, the team fielded the No. 20 car for Leland Honeyman at season finale at Phoenix.

In 2026, the team fielded the No. 20 Toyota for Jake Bollman at Phoenix. Trans-Am Series driver Brad McAllister would make his ARCA Menards Series West at Portland. Kasey Kleyn would drive the No. 20 at fall Phoenix race.

==== Car No. 20 results ====
Year	Driver	No.	Make	1	2	3	4	5	6	7	8	9	10	11	12	13	AMSWC	Pts
2025	Leland Honeyman	20	Toyota	KER	PHO	TUC	CNS	KER	SON	TRI	PIR	AAS	MAD	LVS	PHO; 3		18th	161
2026	Jake Bollman	20	Toyota	KER	PHO; 6	TUC	SHA	CNS	TRI	SON							25th	103
2026	Brad McAllister	20	Toyota								PIR; 18	AAS	MAD	LVS			25th	103
2026	Kasey Kleyn	20	Toyota												PHO; 5	KER	25th	103

=== Car No. 25 history ===
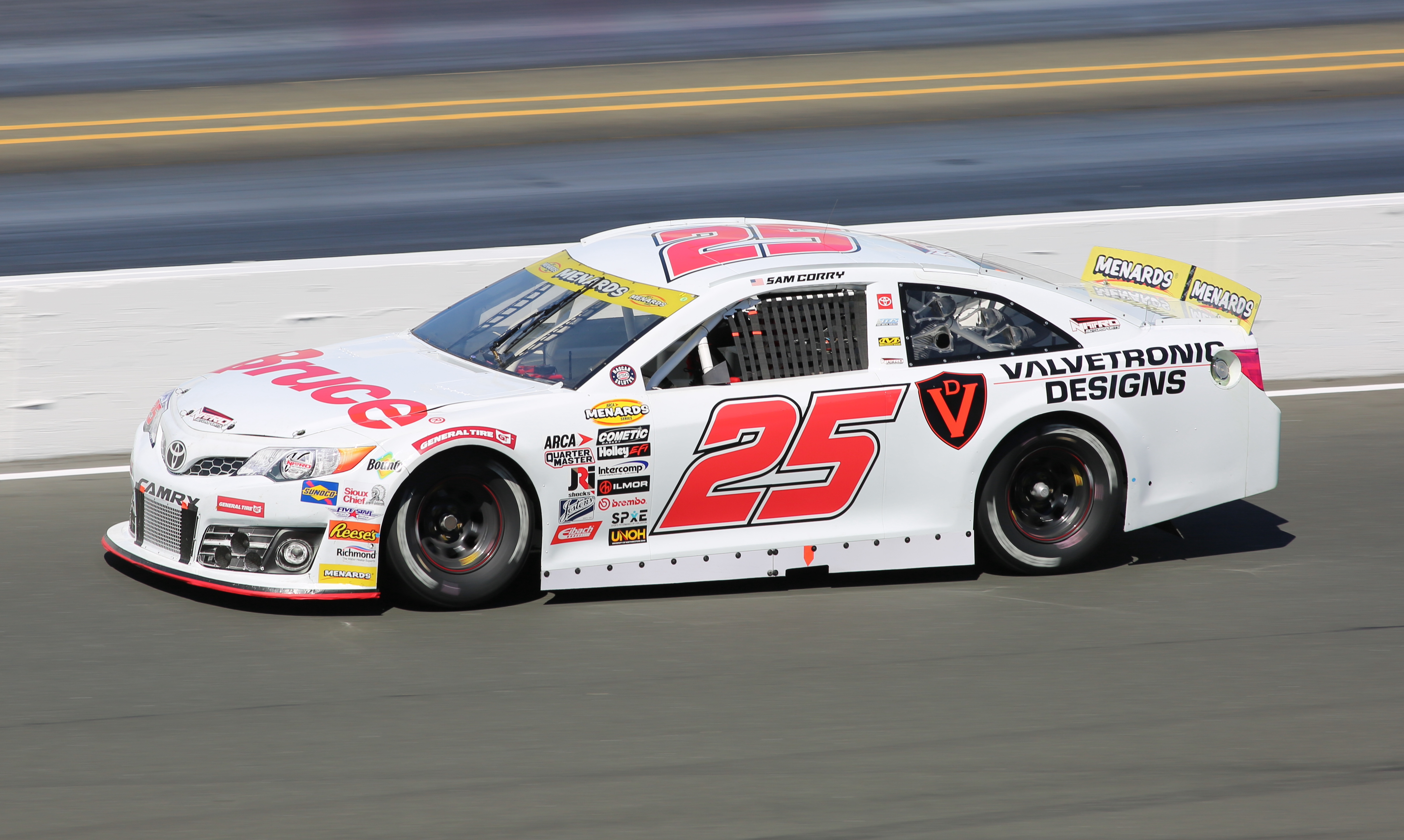
Sam Corry in the No. 25 car at Sonoma Raceway in 2026

In 2025, the team fielded the No. 25 car for Taylor Reimer at season finale at Phoenix.

In 2026, the team fielded the No. 25 Toyota full-time for Julian DaCosta in the ARCA Menards Series West. After poor finishes in the first four races of the season, DaCosta's schedule was demoted to part-time basis. Will Robinson would replace DaCosta at Colorado. Robinson would also drive the No. 25 at Roseville and Madera. Sam Corry would drive the No. 25 at Tri-City, Sonoma, and Las Vegas Motor Speedway Bullring. He won at Sonoma Raceway after starting on pole and leading every lap. Gavan Boschele would drive the No. 25 at fall Phoenix race.

==== Car No. 25 results ====
Year	Driver	No.	Make	1	2	3	4	5	6	7	8	9	10	11	12	13	AMSWC	Pts
2025	Taylor Reimer	25	Toyota	KER	PHO	TUC	CNS	KER	SON	TRI	PIR	AAS	MAD	LVS	PHO; 12		13th	235
2026	Julian DaCosta	25	Toyota	KER; 19	PHO; 31	TUC; 10	SHA; 14										9th	560
2026	Will Robinson	25	Toyota					CNS; 13				AAS; 5	MAD; 8				9th	560
2026	Sam Corry	25	Toyota						TRI; 11	SON; 1**	PIR; 15*			LVS; 22		KER; 17	9th	560
2026	Gavan Boschele	25	Toyota												PHO; 4		9th	560

=== Car No. 46 history ===
In 2025, the team fielded the No. 46 car for Thad Moffitt at Phoenix. He finished seventh.

==== Car No. 46 results ====
Year	Driver	No.	Make	1	2	3	4	5	6	7	8	9	10	11	12	AMSWC	Pts
2025	Thad Moffitt	46	Toyota	KER	PHO; 7	TUC	CNS	KER	SON	TRI	PIR	AAS	MAD	LVS	PHO; 8	37th	36

=== Car No. 55 history ===
In 2026, the team fielded the No. 55 Toyota for Isabella Robusto at Phoenix.

==== Car No. 55 results ====
Year	Driver	No.	Make	1	2	3	4	5	6	7	8	9	10	11	12	13	AMSWC	Pts
2026	Isabella Robusto	55	Toyota	KER	PHO; 21	TUC	SHA	CNS	TRI	SON	PIR	AAS	MAD	LVS	PHO	KER	52nd	13

=== Car No. 70 history ===
In 2025, the team fielded the No. 70 car for Thomas Annunziata at Portland.

In 2026, the team fielded the No. 70 Toyota for Jade Avedisian at Kevin Harvick's Kern Raceway. She won the pole and finished eighth. She would also drive the No. 70 at fall Phoenix race. Annunziata would drive the No. 70 at spring Phoenix race. Will Robinson would drive the No. 70 at Tucson. Ethan Tovo, son of team partner Joe Tovo, will drive the No. 70 at Portland. Donald Theetge would drive the No. 70 at Las Vegas Motor Speedway Bullring. Hudson Sharp would drive the No. 70 at season finale at Kern Raceway.

==== Car No. 70 results ====
Year	Driver	No.	Make	1	2	3	4	5	6	7	8	9	10	11	12	13	AMSWC	Pts
2025	Thomas Annunziata	70	Toyota	KER	PHO	TUC	CNS	KER	SON	TRI	PIR; 2	AAS	MAD	LVS	PHO; 3		20th	121
2026	Jade Avedisian	70	Toyota	KER; 8											PHO; 9		16th	305
2026	Thomas Annunziata	70	Toyota		PHO; 3												16th	305
2026	Will Robinson	70	Toyota			TUC; 16	SHA	CNS	TRI	SON							16th	305
2026	Ethan Tovo	70	Toyota								PIR; 4	AAS	MAD				16th	305
2026	Donald Theetge	70	Toyota											LVS; 13			16th	305
2026	Hudson Sharp	70	Toyota													KER; 2	16th	305

=== Car No. 90 history ===
In 2026, the team fielded the No. 90 car for Jade Avedisian at Phoenix. Trans-Am Series driver Graham Jacobson would make his ARCA Menards Series West at Portland. Wesley Slimp would drive the No. 90 at fall Phoenix race and season finale at Kern Raceway.

==== Car No. 90 results ====
Year	Driver	No.	Make	1	2	3	4	5	6	7	8	9	10	11	12	13	AMSWC	Pts
2026	Jade Avedisian	90	Toyota	KER	PHO; 28	TUC	SHA	CNS	TRI	SON							24th	107
2026	Graham Jacobson	90	Toyota								PIR; 12	AAS	MAD	LVS			24th	107
2026	Wesley Slimp	90	Toyota												PHO; 18	KER; 12	24th	107
