= 2026 Calypso 100 =

ARCA Menards Series race at the Illinois State Fairgrounds Racetrack

Race details
- Race 15 of 20 in the 2026 ARCA Menards Series
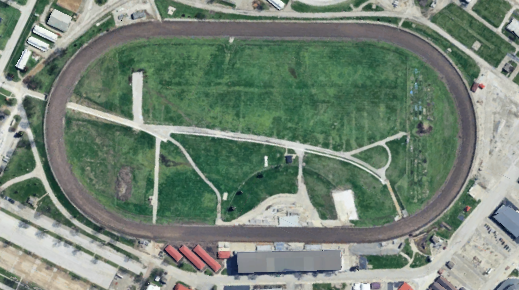
- Date: August 23, 2026
- Location: Illinois State Fairgrounds Racetrack in Springfield, Illinois
- Course: Permanent racing facility
- Course length: 1 miles (1.6 km)
- Distance: 100 laps, 100 mi (160 km)
- Average speed: 79.876 miles per hour (128.548 km/h)

Pole position
Driver	Max Reaves	Joe Gibbs Racing
- Time: 33.999

Most laps led
Driver	Max Reaves	Joe Gibbs Racing
- Laps: 98

Fastest lap
Driver	Carson Brown	Pinnacle Racing Group
- Time: 33.990

Winner
No. 18	Max Reaves	Joe Gibbs Racing

Television in the United States
- Network: FS1
- Announcers: Eric Brennan and Phil Parsons

Radio in the United States
- Radio: ARN

The 2026 Calypso 100 was an ARCA Menards Series race held on Sunday, August 23, 2026, at the Illinois State Fairgrounds Racetrack in Springfield, Illinois. Contested over 100 laps on the 1 mile (1.6 km) dirt oval, it was the 15th race of the 2026 ARCA Menards Series season, and the 44th running of the event.

In a controversial finish, Max Reaves, driving for Joe Gibbs Racing, made an aggressive move on Gavan Boschele with three laps to go, spinning him out from the lead, and taking the victory to earn his sixth career ARCA Menards Series win, and his third of the season. Reaves also dominated the race, leading all but two laps after starting from the pole. Isaac Kitzmiller finished second, and Thomas Annunziata finished third. Taylor Reimer and Boschele rounded out the top five, while Jake Bollman, Kelly Kovski, Isabella Robusto, Tim Monroe, and Jason Kitzmiller rounded out the top ten.

== Report ==
=== Background ===
The Illinois State Fairgrounds Racetrack is a one mile long clay oval motor racetrack on the Illinois State Fairgrounds in Springfield, the state capital. It is frequently nicknamed The Springfield Mile. Constructed in the late 19th century and reconstructed in 1927, the track has hosted competitive auto racing since 1910, making it one of the oldest speedways in the United States. The original mile track utilized the current frontstretch and the other side was behind the current grandstands and the straightaways were connected by tight turns. It is the oldest track to continually host national championship dirt track racing, holding its first national championship race in 1934 under the American Automobile Association banner. It is the home of five world records for automobile racing, making it one of the fastest dirt tracks in the world. Since 1993, the venue is managed by Bob Sargent's Track Enterprises.

The Illinois State Fair mile currently hosts the ARCA Menards Series' Calypso 100 stock car race, USAC Silver Crown dirt cars, UMP Late Models and Modifieds and the A.M.A. Grand National Championship. The only driver who has won races in three disciplines of racing in Ken Schrader who won in ARCA cars (1998), UMP Modifieds (1998), and midgets.

==== Entry list ====
- (R) denotes rookie driver.

#	Driver	Team	Make
03	Alex Clubb	Clubb Racing Inc.	Ford
06	Trenton Masters	Wayne Peterson Motorsports	Toyota
8	Sean Corr	Empire Racing	Chevrolet
10	Tim Monroe	Fast Track Racing	Ford
11	Tony Cosentino	Fast Track Racing	Chevrolet
12	Takuma Koga	Fast Track Racing	Toyota
16	Kelly Kovski	Allgaier Motorsports	Chevrolet
18	Max Reaves (R)	Joe Gibbs Racing	Toyota
19	Kenna Long	Maples Motorsports	Chevrolet
20	Jake Bollman (R)	Nitro Motorsports	Toyota
25	Gavan Boschele (R)	Nitro Motorsports	Toyota
28	Carson Brown (R)	Pinnacle Racing Group	Chevrolet
48	Brad Smith	Brad Smith Motorsports	Ford
55	Isabella Robusto	Nitro Motorsports	Toyota
70	Thomas Annunziata	Nitro Motorsports	Toyota
77	Taylor Reimer	Pinnacle Racing Group	Chevrolet
79	Isaac Kitzmiller	ACR Motorsports	Chevrolet
81	Kevin Campbell	KC Motorsports	Chevrolet
83	Brayton Laster	Clubb Racing Inc.	Ford
86	Jeff Maconi (R)	Clubb Racing Inc.	Ford
91	Shawn Allen Jr.	Maples Motorsports	Chevrolet
97	Jason Kitzmiller	CR7 Motorsports	Chevrolet
98	Dale Shearer	Shearer Speed Racing	Toyota
99	Michael Maples	Maples Motorsports	Chevrolet
Official entry list

== Practice ==
The first and only practice session was held on Sunday, August 23, at 10:00 AM CST, and lasted for 30 minutes.

Max Reaves, driving for Joe Gibbs Racing, set the fastest time in the session, with a lap of 34.626 seconds, and a speed of 103.968 miles per hour (167.320 km/h).

Pos.	#	Driver	Team	Make	Time	Speed
1	18	Max Reaves (R)	Joe Gibbs Racing	Toyota	34.626	103.968
2	25	Gavan Boschele (R)	Nitro Motorsports	Toyota	34.654	103.884
3	79	Isaac Kitzmiller	ACR Motorsports	Chevrolet	34.930	103.063
Full practice results

== Qualifying ==
Qualifying was held on Sunday, August 23, at 11:15 AM CST. The qualifying procedure used was a single-car, one-lap based system. Drivers were on track by themselves and had one lap to post a qualifying time, and whoever set the fastest time won the pole.

Max Reaves, driving for Joe Gibbs Racing, qualified on pole position with a lap of 33.999 seconds, and a speed of 105.885 miles per hour (170.405 km/h).

=== Qualifying results ===
Pos.	#	Driver	Team	Make	Time	Speed
1	18	Max Reaves (R)	Joe Gibbs Racing	Toyota	33.999	105.885
2	28	Carson Brown (R)	Pinnacle Racing Group	Chevrolet	34.432	104.554
3	70	Thomas Annunziata	Nitro Motorsports	Toyota	34.447	104.508
4	55	Isabella Robusto	Nitro Motorsports	Toyota	34.468	104.445
5	77	Taylor Reimer	Pinnacle Racing Group	Chevrolet	34.552	104.191
6	8	Sean Corr	Empire Racing	Chevrolet	34.554	104.185
7	25	Gavan Boschele (R)	Nitro Motorsports	Toyota	34.975	102.931
8	10	Tim Monroe	Fast Track Racing	Ford	35.145	102.433
9	16	Kelly Kovski	Allgaier Motorsports	Chevrolet	35.149	102.421
10	20	Jake Bollman (R)	Nitro Motorsports	Toyota	35.191	102.299
11	11	Tony Cosentino	Fast Track Racing	Chevrolet	35.431	101.606
12	97	Jason Kitzmiller	CR7 Motorsports	Chevrolet	35.532	101.317
13	79	Isaac Kitzmiller	ACR Motorsports	Chevrolet	35.541	101.291
14	91	Shawn Allen Jr.	Maples Motorsports	Chevrolet	36.284	99.217
15	12	Takuma Koga	Fast Track Racing	Toyota	36.562	98.463
16	06	Trenton Masters	Wayne Peterson Motorsports	Toyota	37.755	95.352
17	48	Brad Smith	Brad Smith Motorsports	Ford	37.839	95.140
18	99	Michael Maples	Maples Motorsports	Chevrolet	38.397	93.757
19	86	Jeff Maconi (R)	Clubb Racing Inc.	Ford	38.990	92.331
20	03	Alex Clubb	Clubb Racing Inc.	Ford	39.626	90.849
21	19	Kenna Long	Maples Motorsports	Chevrolet	40.829	88.173
22	81	Kevin Campbell	KC Motorsports	Chevrolet	50.533	71.241
23	98	Dale Shearer	Shearer Speed Racing	Toyota	—	—
24	83	Brayton Laster	Clubb Racing Inc.	Ford	—	—
Official qualifying results

== Race ==
=== Race results ===
Laps: 100

Fin	St	#	Driver	Team	Make	Laps	Led	Status	Pts
1	1	18	Max Reaves (R)	Joe Gibbs Racing	Toyota	100	98	Running	49
2	13	79	Isaac Kitzmiller	ACR Motorsports	Chevrolet	100	1	Running	43
3	3	70	Thomas Annunziata	Nitro Motorsports	Toyota	100	0	Running	91
4	5	77	Taylor Reimer	Pinnacle Racing Group	Chevrolet	100	0	Running	40
5	7	25	Gavan Boschele (R)	Nitro Motorsports	Toyota	100	1	Running	40
6	10	20	Jake Bollman (R)	Nitro Motorsports	Toyota	100	0	Running	88
7	9	16	Kelly Kovski	Allgaier Motorsports	Chevrolet	100	0	Running	37
8	4	55	Isabella Robusto	Nitro Motorsports	Toyota	100	0	Running	86
9	8	10	Tim Monroe	Fast Track Racing	Ford	100	0	Running	35
10	12	97	Jason Kitzmiller	CR7 Motorsports	Chevrolet	100	0	Running	84
11	14	91	Shawn Allen Jr.	Maples Motorsports	Chevrolet	100	0	Running	33
12	6	8	Sean Corr	Empire Racing	Chevrolet	99	0	Running	32
13	2	28	Carson Brown (R)	Pinnacle Racing Group	Chevrolet	99	0	Running	31
14	11	11	Tony Cosentino	Fast Track Racing	Chevrolet	99	0	Running	30
15	15	12	Takuma Koga	Fast Track Racing	Toyota	97	0	Running	79
16	23	98	Dale Shearer	Shearer Speed Racing	Toyota	95	0	Running	28
17	19	86	Jeff Maconi (R)	Clubb Racing Inc.	Ford	94	0	Running	77
18	17	48	Brad Smith	Brad Smith Motorsports	Ford	94	0	Running	76
19	20	03	Alex Clubb	Clubb Racing Inc.	Ford	61	0	Running	75
20	18	99	Michael Maples	Maples Motorsports	Chevrolet	48	0	Mechanical	74
21	16	06	Trenton Masters	Wayne Peterson Motorsports	Toyota	7	0	Accident	23
22	21	19	Kenna Long	Maples Motorsports	Chevrolet	3	0	Mechanical	22
23	22	81	Kevin Campbell	KC Motorsports	Chevrolet	2	0	Mechanical	21
24	24	83	Brayton Laster	Clubb Racing Inc.	Ford	0	0	Did Not Start	20
Official race results

=== Race statistics ===
- Lead changes: 4 among 3 different drivers
- Cautions/Laps: 5 for 23 laps
- Red flags: 0
- Time of race: 1 hour, 15 minutes and 7 seconds
- Average speed: 79.876 miles per hour (128.548 km/h)

== Standings after the race ==
Drivers' Championship standings

	Pos	Driver	Points
	1	Jake Bollman	711
	2	Thomas Annunziata	707 (–4)
	3	Isabella Robusto	598 (–113)
	4	Jason Kitzmiller	594 (–117)
	5	Takuma Koga	555 (–156)
	6	Michael Maples	511 (–200)
	7	Alex Clubb	501 (–210)
2	8	Brad Smith	440 (–271)
3	9	Jeff Maconi	411 (–300)
2	10	Bobby Dale Earnhardt	410 (–301)

- Note: Only the first 10 positions are included for the driver standings.

Previous race: 2026 JR & CO. 150	ARCA Menards Series; 2026 season	Next race: 2026 Atlas 200
