= Taylor Reimer =

American racing driver (born 1999)

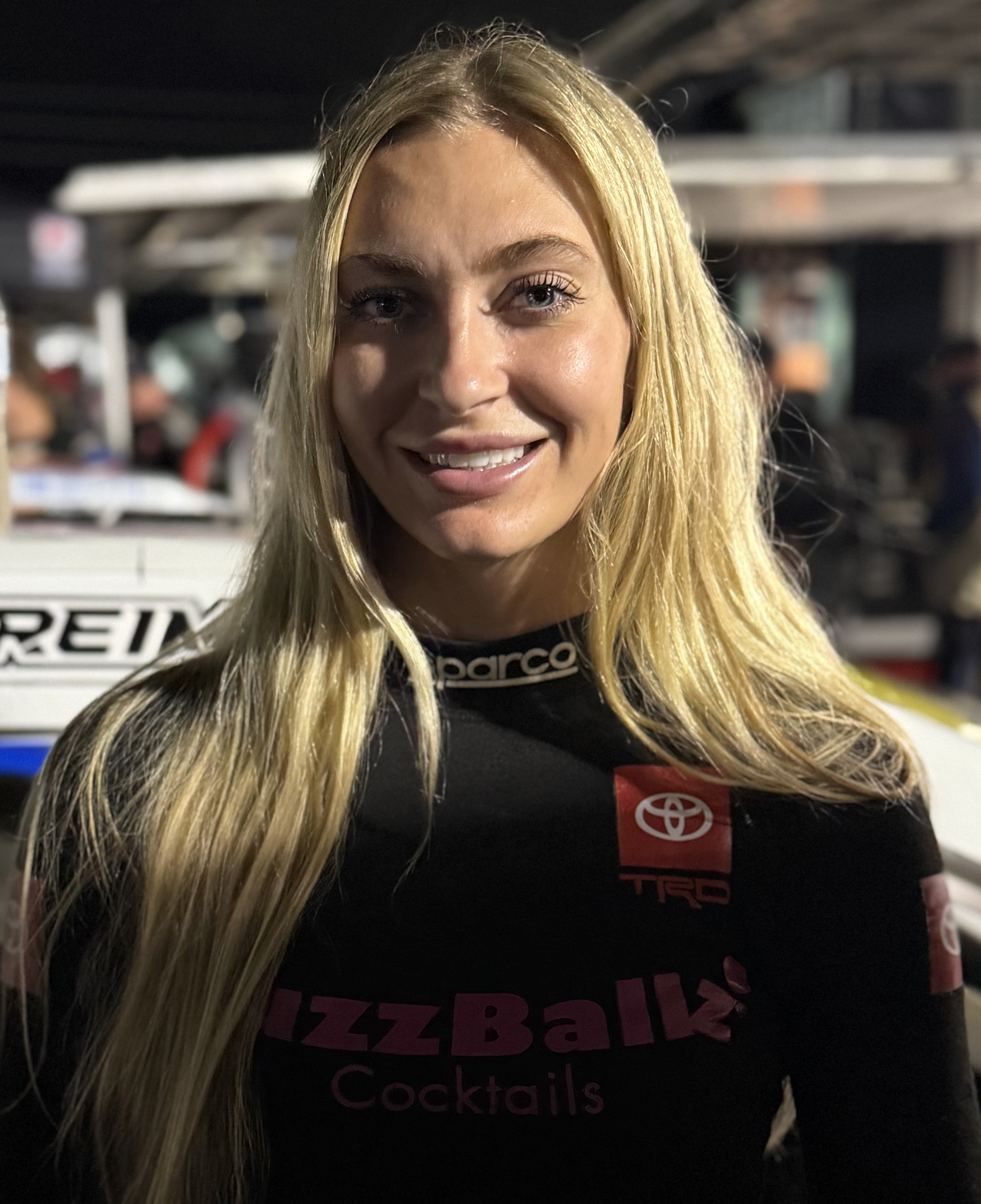
- Reimer in 2025
- Born: Taylor Jordan Reimer; December 2, 1999 (age 26); Tulsa, Oklahoma, U.S.
- Achievements: Multiple firsts for women in American auto racing, including: First to win a National Midget race (Millbridge, 2022); First to win an Xtreme Outlaw Midget Series race (Millbridge, 2022)

ARCA Menards Series career
- 13 races run over 4 years
- Best finish: 21st (2026)
- First race: 2023 Dutch Boy 100 (Springfield)
- Last race: 2026 Audubon Park 100 (DuQuoin)
Wins	Top tens	Poles
0	11	0

ARCA Menards Series West career
- 4 races run over 2 years
- Best finish: 17th (2025)
- First race: 2025 Star Nursery 150 (Las Vegas Bullring)
- Last race: 2026 Desert Diamond Casino West Valley 100 (Phoenix)
Wins	Top tens	Poles
0	2	0
- Statistics up to date as of October 18, 2026.

Taylor Jordan Reimer (born December 2, 1999) is an American racing driver. She last competed part-time in the ARCA Menards Series, driving the No. 77 Chevrolet for Pinnacle Racing Group. She has previously competed part-time in the NASCAR Regional Series Limited Late Models, driving for Lee Faulk Racing & Development. She is a former member of the Toyota Racing Development program.

== Racing career ==
=== Early racing career ===
Reimer started racing 50cc go-karts in 2005 at Tulsa Kart Club in Tulsa, Oklahoma. After earning a track championship, she moved to Jr. Sprints at Port City Raceway. She had won every major race at Port City and secured another track championship. She placed second in the Tulsa Shootout in 2011. After racing Jr. Sprints for a few years, Reimer moved up to Restricted Winged Micros. She has also won almost every single major race in the Restricted class. She was runner-up track champion and had multiple top tens finishes in the Tulsa Shootout. Reimer is still currently the winningest female at Port City Raceway in Tulsa, Oklahoma. In 2022, Reimer had a very successful season finishing second in the POWRi National Midget League points standings.

=== USAC ===
Reimer first competed at the Chili Bowl Nationals in 2021 with Dave Mac Motorsports. Midway through the 2021 season, she joined Keith Kunz Motorsports (KKM), and was later signed to the compete full-time for the team in the 2022 USAC National Midget Championship. After initially finishing second in a race at Millbridge Speedway, Reimer was later credited with the race victory after Cannon McIntosh's disqualification, making her the first female driver to win a National Midget feature race. Reimer finished tenth in the 2022 series standings, allowing her to return to KKM in 2023.

=== Late models ===
Reimer made her Limited Late Model debut in October 2023, finishing ninth for Lee Faulk Racing in a 24-car field at Tri-County Speedway. In December, she announced plans to work towards a transition to pavement racing during the 2024 season to prepare for a long-term future in NASCAR. Reimer won her first Limited Late Model race at Tri-County on May 11, 2024. She would follow this up with a win at Hickory Motor Speedway on August 10, 2024. On September 10, 2024, Reimer was named by NASCAR as one of five NASCAR Regional drivers to watch.

=== ARCA ===
==== 2023 ====
Reimer made her debut in the ARCA Menards Series for Venturini Motorsports at Springfield in 2023, finishing eighth in one of the series' two dirt track races.

==== 2024 ====
Reimer returned to Venturini's ARCA program in 2024 to run both Springfield and the second dirt track race at DuQuoin while also planning to make her ARCA pavement debut in the West Series race at the Las Vegas Motor Speedway Bullring. At Springfield, the Venturini team entered cars for a total of four female drivers, with Reimer running the team's No. 55 Toyota. She finished the race third, matching her qualifying position and placing one spot behind her teammate Isabella Robusto.

==== 2025 ====
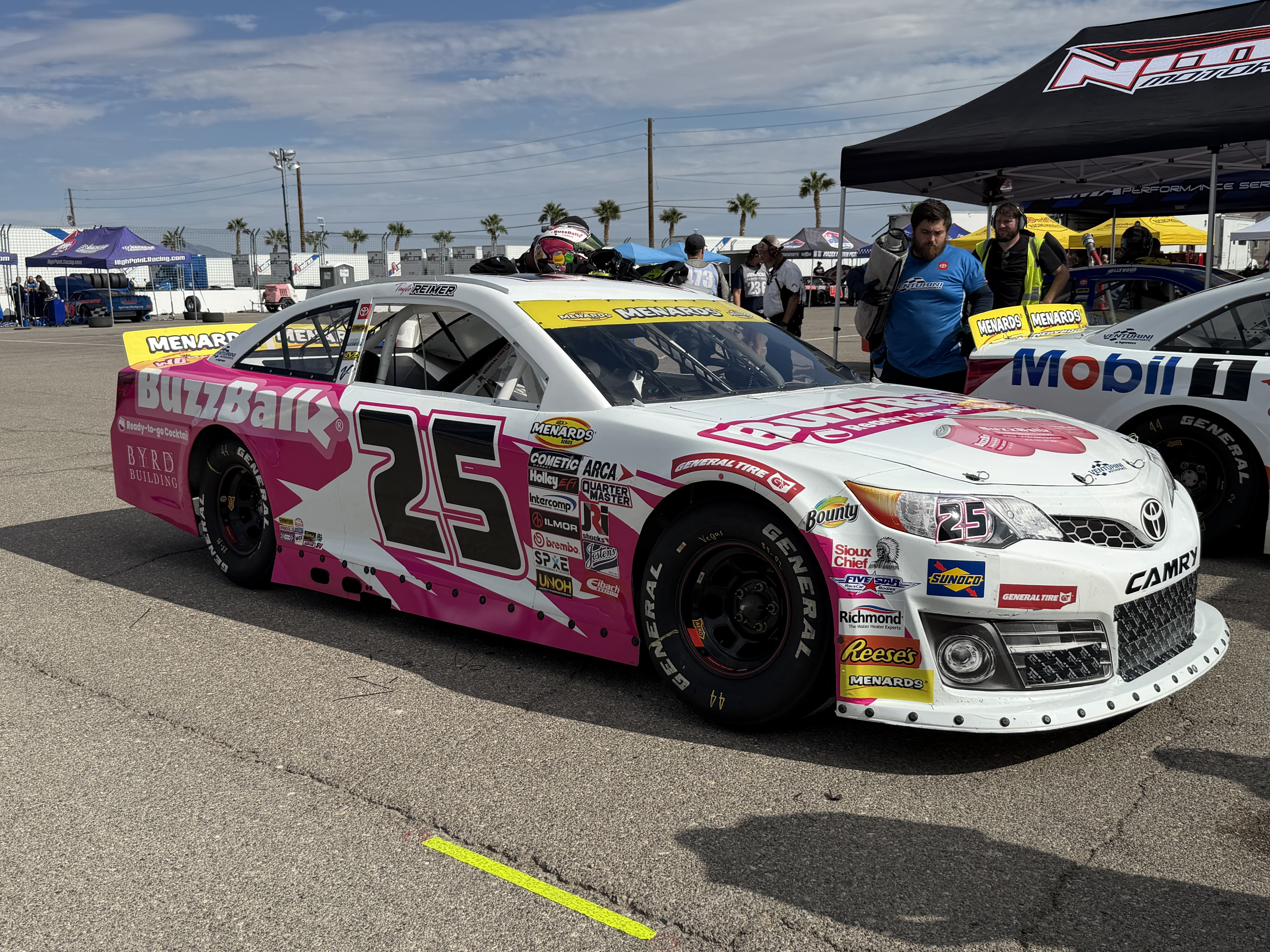
Reimer's No. 25 ARCA car at the Las Vegas Bullring in 2025.

In 2025, Reimer would move to Nitro Motorsports in the No. 70, in a joint venture with Venturini Motorsports who were shutting their doors at seasons end.

==== 2026 ====
Reimer's car post-race at Talladega in April 2026.

For 2026, Reimer would move over to Pinnacle Racing Group and Chevrolet in their No. 77 entry for select starts, starting at the season opener in Daytona.

== Personal life ==
Originally from Tulsa, Oklahoma, Reimer attended the University of Oklahoma, putting her racing career on hold to focus on her education and pursue competitive cheerleading. She graduated from the university in 2022 with a degree in health and exercise science and a minor in business.

Reimer has been in a relationship with fellow NASCAR driver Corey Heim since 2024.

== Motorsports career results ==
=== Stock car career summary ===
Season	Series	Team	Races	Wins	Top 5	Top 10	Points	Position
2023	ARCA Menards Series	Venturini Motorsports	1	0	0	2	36	80th
2024	ARCA Menards Series	Venturini Motorsports	2	0	1	2	78	51st
2025	ARCA Menards Series West	Venturini Motorsports	1	0	0	1	117	17th
2025	ARCA Menards Series West	Nitro Motorsports	1	0	0	0	117	17th
2025	ARCA Menards Series	Nitro Motorsports	2	0	1	2	113	38th
2025	ARCA Menards Series	Venturini Motorsports	1	0	0	1	113	38th
2026	ARCA Menards Series West	Central Coast Racing	1	0	0	0	55	37th
2026	ARCA Menards Series West	Pinnacle Racing Group	1	0	1	1	55	37th
2026	ARCA Menards Series	Pinnacle Racing Group	6	0	3	5	222	21st
2026	ARCA Menards Series	Central Coast Racing	1	0	0	0	222	21st

=== ARCA Menards Series ===
(key) (Bold – Pole position awarded by qualifying time. Italics – Pole position earned by points standings or practice time. * – Most laps led. ** – All laps led.)

ARCA Menards Series results
Year	Team	No.	Make	1	2	3	4	5	6	7	8	9	10	11	12	13	14	15	16	17	18	19	20	AMSC	Pts	Ref
2023	Venturini Motorsports	15	Toyota	DAY	PHO	TAL	KAN	CLT	BLN	ELK	MOH	IOW	POC	MCH	IRP	GLN	ISF; 8	MLW	DSF	KAN	BRI	SLM	TOL	80th	36	
2024	Venturini Motorsports	55	Toyota	DAY	PHO	TAL	DOV	KAN	CLT	IOW	MOH	BLN	IRP	SLM	ELK	MCH	ISF; 3	MLW	DSF; 7	GLN	BRI	KAN	TOL	51st	78	
2025	Nitro Motorsports	70	Toyota	DAY	PHO	TAL	KAN	CLT	MCH	BLN	ELK; 8	LRP	DOV	IRP	IOW	GLN	ISF	MAD	DSF	BRI	SLM	KAN; 5		38th	113	
2025	Venturini Motorsports	25	Toyota																				TOL; 6	38th	113	
2026	Pinnacle Racing Group	77	Chevy	DAY; 30			TAL; 6	GLN	TOL	MCH	POC	BER; 4	ELK; 4	CHI	LRP	IRP	IOW	ISF; 4	MAD	DSF; 6	SLM	BRI	KAN	21st	222	
2026	Central Coast Racing	13	Toyota		PHO; 32	KAN																		21st	222	

==== ARCA Menards Series West ====
ARCA Menards Series West results
Year	Team	No.	Make	1	2	3	4	5	6	7	8	9	10	11	12	13	AMSWC	Pts	Ref
2025	Venturini Motorsports	25	Toyota	KER	PHO	TUC	CNS	KER	SON	TRI	PIR	AAS	MAD	LVS; 9			17th	117	
2025	Nitro Motorsports	25	Toyota												PHO; 12		17th	117	
2026	Central Coast Racing	13	Toyota	KER	PHO; 32	TUC	SHA	CNS	TRI	SON	PIR	AAS	MAD	LVS			37th	55	
2026	Pinnacle Racing Group	82	Chevy												PHO; 2	KER	37th	55	
