= 2026 Audubon Park 100 =

ARCA Menards Series race at the DuQuoin State Fairgrounds Racetrack

Race details
- Race 17 of 20 in the 2026 ARCA Menards Series
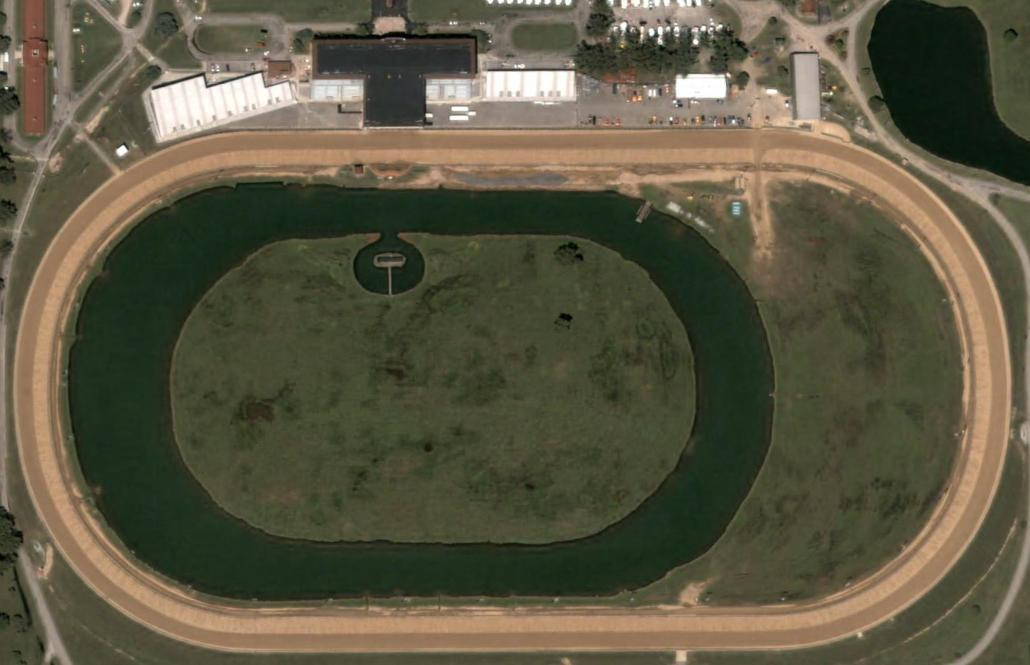
- Date: September 6, 2026
- Location: DuQuoin State Fairgrounds Racetrack in Du Quoin, Illinois
- Course: Permanent racing facility
- Course length: 0.99 miles (1.6 km)
- Distance: 100 laps, 100 mi (160.934 km)
- Average speed: 72.610 miles per hour (116.854 km/h)

Pole position
Driver	Carson Brown	Pinnacle Racing Group
- Time: 34.431

Most laps led
Driver	Carson Brown	Pinnacle Racing Group
- Laps: 90

Fastest lap
Driver	Thomas Annunziata	Nitro Motorsports
- Time: 34.411

Winner
No. 28	Carson Brown	Pinnacle Racing Group

Television in the United States
- Network: FS1
- Announcers: Eric Brennan and Phil Parsons

Radio in the United States
- Radio: ARN

The 2026 Audubon Park 100 was an ARCA Menards Series race held on Sunday, September 6, 2026, at the DuQuoin State Fairgrounds Racetrack in Du Quoin, Illinois. Contested over 100 laps on the 0.99 miles (1.59 km) dirt oval, it was the 16th race of the 2026 ARCA Menards Series season, and the 46th running of the event.

Carson Brown, driving for Pinnacle Racing Group, pulled off a dominating performance, leading a race-high 90 laps after starting from the position to earn his second career ARCA Menards Series win, and his second of the season. Jake Bollman finished second, and Kelly Kovski, in his final dirt start in the series, finished third. Gavan Boschele and Thomas Annunziata rounded out the top five, while Taylor Reimer, Jason Kitzmiller, Isaac Kitzmiller, Chase Howard, and Ryan Vargas rounded out the top ten.

== Report ==
=== Background ===
DuQuoin State Fairgrounds Racetrack, the track where the race was held.

DuQuoin State Fairgrounds Racetrack is a one-mile (1.6-km) clay oval motor racetrack in Du Quoin, Illinois, about 90 miles (140 km) southeast of St Louis, Missouri. It is a stop on the ARCA Menards Series, USAC Silver Crown Series and American Flat Track.

The DuQuoin "Magic Mile" racetrack was constructed on reclaimed stripmine land in 1946 by W.R. Hayes. The track's first national championship race was held in September 1948. In the second race on October 10, popular AAA National driving champion Ted Horn was killed in the fourth turn when a spindle on his championship car broke. The national championship race for the USAC Silver Crown dirt cars is held in his honor.

==== Entry list ====
- (R) denotes rookie driver.

#	Driver	Team	Make
00	John Kennedy	Jet Daddy Racing	Chevrolet
03	Alex Clubb	Clubb Racing Inc.	Ford
06	Nate Moeller	Wayne Peterson Motorsports	Ford
8	Sean Corr	Empire Racing	Chevrolet
10	Tim Monroe	Fast Track Racing	Ford
11	Chase Buscaglia	Fast Track Racing	Chevrolet
12	Takuma Koga	Fast Track Racing	Toyota
16	Kelly Kovski	Allgaier Motorsports	Chevrolet
18	Max Reaves (R)	Joe Gibbs Racing	Toyota
20	Jake Bollman (R)	Nitro Motorsports	Toyota
25	Gavan Boschele (R)	Nitro Motorsports	Toyota
28	Carson Brown (R)	Pinnacle Racing Group	Chevrolet
48	Brad Smith	Brad Smith Motorsports	Ford
55	Isabella Robusto	Nitro Motorsports	Toyota
70	Thomas Annunziata	Nitro Motorsports	Toyota
77	Taylor Reimer	Pinnacle Racing Group	Chevrolet
79	Isaac Kitzmiller	ACR Motorsports	Chevrolet
81	Kevin Campbell	KC Motorsports	Chevrolet
86	Jeff Maconi (R)	Clubb Racing Inc.	Ford
89	Chase Howard	Rise Racing	Chevrolet
91	Ryan Vargas	Maples Motorsports	Chevrolet
97	Jason Kitzmiller	CR7 Motorsports	Chevrolet
98	Dale Shearer	Shearer Speed Racing	Toyota
99	Michael Maples	Maples Motorsports	Chevrolet
Official entry list

== Practice ==
The first and only practice session was held on Sunday, September 6, at 4:30 PM CST, and lasted for 30 minutes.

Carson Brown, driving for Pinnacle Racing Group, set the fastest time in the session, with a lap of 34.147 seconds, and a speed of 105.427 miles per hour (169.668 km/h).

=== Practice results ===
Pos.	#	Driver	Team	Make	Time	Speed
1	28	Carson Brown (R)	Pinnacle Racing Group	Chevrolet	34.147	105.427
2	70	Thomas Annunziata	Nitro Motorsports	Toyota	34.447	104.508
3	77	Taylor Reimer	Pinnacle Racing Group	Chevrolet	34.663	103.857
Full practice results

== Qualifying ==
Qualifying was held on Sunday, September 6, at 6:00 PM CST. The qualifying procedure used was a single-car, one-lap based system. Drivers were on track by themselves and had one lap to post a qualifying time, and whoever set the fastest time won the pole.

Carson Brown, driving for Pinnacle Racing Group, qualified on pole position with a lap of 34.431 seconds, and a speed of 104.557 miles per hour (168.268 km/h).

=== Qualifying results ===
Pos.	#	Driver	Team	Make	Time	Speed
1	28	Carson Brown (R)	Pinnacle Racing Group	Chevrolet	34.431	104.557
2	25	Gavan Boschele (R)	Nitro Motorsports	Toyota	34.438	104.536
3	70	Thomas Annunziata	Nitro Motorsports	Toyota	34.505	104.333
4	18	Max Reaves (R)	Joe Gibbs Racing	Toyota	34.650	103.896
5	20	Jake Bollman (R)	Nitro Motorsports	Toyota	34.729	103.660
6	55	Isabella Robusto	Nitro Motorsports	Toyota	34.858	103.276
7	16	Kelly Kovski	Allgaier Motorsports	Chevrolet	35.126	102.488
8	79	Isaac Kitzmiller	ACR Motorsports	Chevrolet	35.153	102.409
9	97	Jason Kitzmiller	CR7 Motorsports	Chevrolet	35.554	101.254
10	89	Chase Howard	Rise Racing	Chevrolet	36.303	99.165
11	12	Takuma Koga	Fast Track Racing	Toyota	36.515	98.590
12	10	Tim Monroe	Fast Track Racing	Ford	36.563	98.460
13	8	Sean Corr	Empire Racing	Chevrolet	36.679	98.149
14	91	Ryan Vargas	Maples Motorsports	Chevrolet	37.365	96.347
15	99	Michael Maples	Maples Motorsports	Chevrolet	37.617	95.701
16	11	Chase Buscaglia	Fast Track Racing	Chevrolet	37.715	95.453
17	48	Brad Smith	Brad Smith Motorsports	Ford	38.106	94.473
18	98	Dale Shearer	Shearer Speed Racing	Toyota	39.411	91.345
19	86	Jeff Maconi (R)	Clubb Racing Inc.	Ford	39.913	90.196
20	00	John Kennedy	Jet Daddy Racing	Chevrolet	39.926	90.167
21	03	Alex Clubb	Clubb Racing Inc.	Ford	40.981	87.846
22	06	Nate Moeller	Wayne Peterson Motorsports	Ford	41.949	85.818
23	81	Kevin Campbell	KC Motorsports	Chevrolet	43.971	81.872
24	77	Taylor Reimer	Pinnacle Racing Group	Chevrolet	53.956	66.721
Official qualifying results

== Race ==
=== Race results ===
Laps: 100

Fin	St	#	Driver	Team	Make	Laps	Led	Status	Pts
1	1	28	Carson Brown (R)	Pinnacle Racing Group	Chevrolet	100	90	Running	49
2	5	20	Jake Bollman (R)	Nitro Motorsports	Toyota	100	1	Running	43
3	7	16	Kelly Kovski	Allgaier Motorsports	Chevrolet	100	0	Running	41
4	2	25	Gavan Boschele (R)	Nitro Motorsports	Toyota	100	6	Running	41
5	3	70	Thomas Annunziata	Nitro Motorsports	Toyota	100	1	Running	40
6	24	77	Taylor Reimer	Pinnacle Racing Group	Chevrolet	100	0	Running	38
7	9	97	Jason Kitzmiller	CR7 Motorsports	Chevrolet	100	0	Running	37
8	8	79	Isaac Kitzmiller	ACR Motorsports	Chevrolet	100	0	Running	36
9	10	89	Chase Howard	Rise Racing	Chevrolet	100	0	Running	35
10	14	91	Ryan Vargas	Maples Motorsports	Chevrolet	100	0	Running	34
11	11	12	Takuma Koga	Fast Track Racing	Toyota	98	0	Running	33
12	21	03	Alex Clubb	Clubb Racing Inc.	Ford	94	0	Running	32
13	20	00	John Kennedy	Jet Daddy Racing	Chevrolet	92	2	Running	32
14	6	55	Isabella Robusto	Nitro Motorsports	Toyota	88	0	Running	30
15	16	11	Chase Buscaglia	Fast Track Racing	Chevrolet	84	0	Mechanical	29
16	13	8	Sean Corr	Empire Racing	Chevrolet	81	0	Mechanical	28
17	4	18	Max Reaves (R)	Joe Gibbs Racing	Toyota	78	0	Accident	27
18	19	86	Jeff Maconi (R)	Clubb Racing Inc.	Ford	73	0	Running	26
19	22	06	Nate Moeller	Wayne Peterson Motorsports	Ford	38	0	Mechanical	25
20	12	10	Tim Monroe	Fast Track Racing	Ford	33	0	Mechanical	24
21	15	99	Michael Maples	Maples Motorsports	Chevrolet	32	0	Accident	23
22	18	98	Dale Shearer	Shearer Speed Racing	Toyota	18	0	Mechanical	22
23	17	48	Brad Smith	Brad Smith Motorsports	Ford	12	0	Mechanical	21
24	23	81	Kevin Campbell	KC Motorsports	Chevrolet	7	0	Mechanical	20
Official race results

=== Race statistics ===
- Lead changes: 8 among 5 different drivers
- Cautions/Laps: 7 for 39 laps
- Red flags: 0
- Time of race: 1 hour, 22 minutes and 38 seconds
- Average speed: 72.610 miles per hour (116.854 km/h)

== Standings after the race ==
Drivers' Championship standings

	Pos	Driver	Points
	1	Jake Bollman	794
	2	Thomas Annunziata	786 (–8)
1	3	Jason Kitzmiller	666 (–128)
1	4	Isabella Robusto	665 (–129)
	5	Takuma Koga	621 (–173)
1	6	Alex Clubb	562 (–232)
1	7	Michael Maples	560 (–234)
	8	Brad Smith	484 (–310)
	9	Jeff Maconi	464 (–330)
1	10	Max Reaves	434 (–360)

- Note: Only the first 10 positions are included for the driver standings.

Previous race: 2026 Atlas 200	ARCA Menards Series; 2026 season	Next race: 2026 Spruce 212
