= 2026 Kyle Busch Classic =

ARCA Menards Series West race at The Bullring at Las Vegas Motor Speedway

2026 Kyle Busch Classic presented by Star Nursery
Race details
- Race 11 of 13 in the 2026 ARCA Menards Series West
- Date: October 2, 2026
- Location: The Bullring at Las Vegas Motor Speedway in Las Vegas, Nevada
- Course: Permanent racing facility
- Course length: 0.375 miles (0.604 km)
- Distance: 167 laps, 62.625 mi (100.79 km)
- Scheduled distance: 151 laps, 56.625 mi (91.129 km)
- Average speed: 56.788 miles per hour (91.391 km/h)

Pole position
Driver	Helio Meza	Pinnacle Racing Group
- Time: 15.358

Most laps led
Driver	Trevor Huddleston	High Point Racing
- Laps: 153

Fastest lap
Driver	Trevor Huddleston	High Point Racing
- Time: 15.416

Winner
No. 17	Taylor Mayhew	Cook Racing Technologies

Television in the United States
- Network: FloRacing
- Announcers: Charles Krall

Radio in the United States
- Radio: ARN

The 2026 Kyle Busch Classic presented by Star Nursery was an ARCA Menards Series West race held on Friday, October 2, 2026, at The Bullring at Las Vegas Motor Speedway in Las Vegas, Nevada. Contested over 167 laps—extended from 151 laps due to an overtime finish on the 0.375-mile (0.604 km) short track, it was the eleventh race of the 2026 ARCA Menards Series West season, and the 8th running of the event.

Taylor Mayhew, driving for Cook Racing Technologies, made a bump-and-run pass on Robbie Kennealy in the final corner in a one lap shootout, and snuck by to earn his first career ARCA Menards Series West win. Trevor Huddleston started second and led the race-high 153 laps, before getting spun on a late restart, rebounding to finish fifth. At race's end, Kennealy finished second, and Cole Denton finished third. Vito Cancilla and Huddleston rounded out the top five, while Mason Massey, Tyler Tomassi, Eric Johnson Jr., Eric Rhead, and Andrew Chapman rounded out the top ten.

== Report ==
=== Background ===
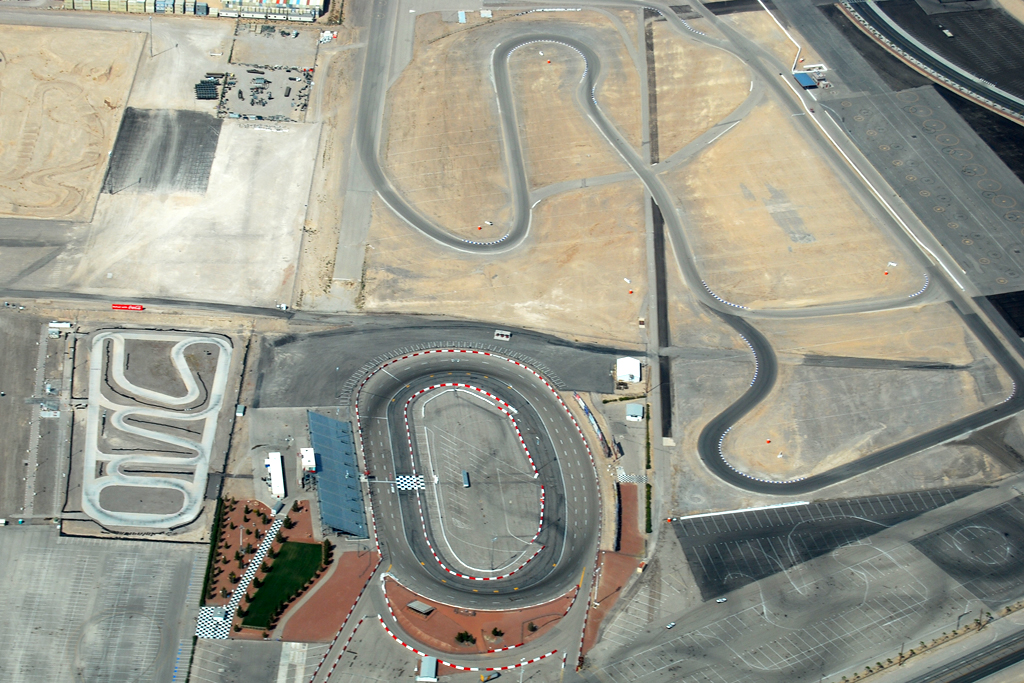
The Bullring at Las Vegas Motor Speedway, the track where the race was held.

The Bullring at Las Vegas Motor Speedway, located in Clark County, Nevada outside the Las Vegas city limits and about 15 miles northeast of the Las Vegas Strip, is a 1,200-acre (490 ha) complex of multiple tracks for motorsports racing. The complex is owned by Speedway Motorsports, Inc., which is headquartered in Charlotte, North Carolina. The track is located near the Las Vegas Motor Speedway.

The complex was built in 1985 as an 1/3 mile (0.54 km) oval that was assisted with donations of barriers that were used in the Caesars Palace Grand Prix. In 2000, the track was modified to become 3/8 mile (0.60 km) and was renamed the "Bullring".

In 2026, the track was repaved. The race was renamed the Kyle Busch Classic presented by Star Nursery in honor of the late two-time NASCAR Cup Series champion Kyle Busch, who developed his skills at The Bullring before embarking on his legendary career.

==== Entry list ====
- (R) denotes rookie driver.

#	Driver	Team	Make
1	Robbie Kennealy	Jan's Towing Racing	Ford
04	Ian Wood	Kart Idaho Racing	Chevrolet
4	Kyle Keller	Nascimento Motorsports	Chevrolet
05	David Smith	Shockwave Motorsports	Toyota
5	Eric Johnson Jr.	Jerry Pitts Racing	Toyota
7	Gavin Ray (R)	Jerry Pitts Racing	Toyota
15	Mia Lovell (R)	Nitro Motorsports	Toyota
16	Hailie Deegan	Bill McAnally Racing	Chevrolet
17	Taylor Mayhew	Cook Racing Technologies	Chevrolet
19	Mason Massey	Bill McAnally Racing	Chevrolet
20	Vito Cancilla	Bill McAnally Racing	Chevrolet
25	Sam Corry	Nitro Motorsports	Toyota
28	Helio Meza	Pinnacle Racing Group	Chevrolet
29	Ryan Phipps	Peyton Saxton Racing	Toyota
31	T. J. Curran	Rise Racing	Chevrolet
38	Ray Bolinger	Kart Idaho Racing	Toyota
41	Quinn Davis	Jan's Towing Racing	Ford
50	Trevor Huddleston	High Point Racing	Ford
51	Scotty Milan	Strike Mamba Racing	Chevrolet
55	Andrew Chapman (R)	High Point Racing	Ford
66	Eric Rhead	66 Rhead Racing	Ford
70	Donald Theetge	Nitro Motorsports	Toyota
71	Cole Denton (R)	Jan's Towing Racing	Ford
72	Tyler Tomassi	Strike Mamba Racing	Chevrolet
77	Donald Witkowski	Performance P-1 Motorsports	Toyota
Official entry list

== Practice ==
The first and only practice session was held on Friday, October 2, at 12:00 pm PST, and lasted for 60 minutes.

Trevor Huddleston, driving for High Point Racing, set the fastest time in the session, with a lap of 15.431 seconds, and a speed of 87.486 miles per hour (140.795 km/h).

=== Practice results ===
Pos.	#	Driver	Team	Make	Time	Speed
1	50	Trevor Huddleston	High Point Racing	Ford	15.431	87.486
2	28	Helio Meza	Pinnacle Racing Group	Chevrolet	15.439	87.441
3	4	Kyle Keller	Nascimento Motorsports	Chevrolet	15.464	87.300
Full practice results

== Qualifying ==
Qualifying was held on Friday, October 2, at 2:05 pm PST. The qualifying procedure used is was single-car, two-lap system with one round. Drivers were on track by themselves and had two laps to post a qualifying time, and whoever set the fastest time won the pole.

Helio Meza, driving for Pinnacle Racing Group, qualified on pole position with a lap of 15.358 seconds, and a speed of 87.902 miles per hour (141.465 km/h).

=== Qualifying results ===
Pos.	#	Driver	Team	Make	Time	Speed
1	28	Helio Meza	Pinnacle Racing Group	Chevrolet	15.358	87.902
2	50	Trevor Huddleston	High Point Racing	Ford	15.532	86.917
3	25	Sam Corry	Nitro Motorsports	Toyota	15.649	86.267
4	16	Hailie Deegan	Bill McAnally Racing	Chevrolet	15.650	86.262
5	1	Robbie Kennealy	Jan's Towing Racing	Ford	15.662	86.196
6	19	Mason Massey	Bill McAnally Racing	Chevrolet	15.733	85.807
7	71	Cole Denton (R)	Jan's Towing Racing	Ford	15.734	85.801
8	5	Eric Johnson Jr.	Jerry Pitts Racing	Toyota	15.743	85.752
9	20	Vito Cancilla	Bill McAnally Racing	Chevrolet	15.765	85.633
10	4	Kyle Keller	Nascimento Motorsports	Chevrolet	15.832	85.270
11	7	Gavin Ray (R)	Jerry Pitts Racing	Toyota	15.927	84.762
12	15	Mia Lovell (R)	Nitro Motorsports	Toyota	15.955	84.613
13	41	Quinn Davis	Jan's Towing Racing	Ford	15.979	84.486
14	55	Andrew Chapman (R)	High Point Racing	Ford	15.987	84.444
15	77	Donald Witkowski	Performance P-1 Motorsports	Toyota	16.037	84.180
16	70	Donald Theetge	Nitro Motorsports	Toyota	16.178	83.447
17	29	Ryan Phipps	Peyton Saxton Racing	Toyota	16.218	83.241
18	66	Eric Rhead	66 Rhead Racing	Ford	16.277	82.939
19	04	Ian Wood	Kart Idaho Racing	Chevrolet	16.363	82.503
20	05	David Smith	Shockwave Motorsports	Toyota	16.580	81.423
21	72	Tyler Tomassi	Strike Mamba Racing	Chevrolet	16.626	81.198
22	51	Scotty Milan	Strike Mamba Racing	Chevrolet	17.871	75.541
23	31	T. J. Curran	Rise Racing	Chevrolet	20.654	65.363
24	17	Taylor Mayhew	Cook Racing Technologies	Chevrolet	—	—
25	38	Ray Bolinger	Kart Idaho Racing	Toyota	—	—
Official qualifying results

== Race ==
=== Race results ===
Laps: 167

Fin	St	#	Driver	Team	Make	Laps	Led	Status	Pts
1	23	17	Taylor Mayhew	Cook Racing Technologies	Chevrolet	167	1	Running	47
2	5	1	Robbie Kennealy	Jan's Towing Racing	Ford	167	9	Running	43
3	7	71	Cole Denton (R)	Jan's Towing Racing	Ford	167	0	Running	41
4	9	20	Vito Cancilla	Bill McAnally Racing	Chevrolet	167	0	Running	40
5	2	50	Trevor Huddleston	High Point Racing	Ford	167	153	Running	41
6	6	19	Mason Massey	Bill McAnally Racing	Chevrolet	167	0	Running	38
7	21	72	Tyler Tomassi	Strike Mamba Racing	Chevrolet	167	0	Running	37
8	8	5	Eric Johnson Jr.	Jerry Pitts Racing	Toyota	167	0	Running	36
9	18	66	Eric Rhead	66 Rhead Racing	Ford	167	0	Running	35
10	14	55	Andrew Chapman (R)	High Point Racing	Ford	167	0	Running	34
11	11	7	Gavin Ray (R)	Jerry Pitts Racing	Toyota	166	0	Running	33
12	15	77	Donald Witkowski	Performance P-1 Motorsports	Toyota	166	0	Running	32
13	16	70	Donald Theetge	Nitro Motorsports	Toyota	166	0	Running	31
14	13	41	Quinn Davis	Jan's Towing Racing	Ford	164	0	Running	30
15	19	04	Ian Wood	Kart Idaho Racing	Chevrolet	164	0	Running	29
16	4	16	Hailie Deegan	Bill McAnally Racing	Chevrolet	164	0	Running	28
17	17	29	Ryan Phipps	Peyton Saxton Racing	Toyota	162	0	Running	27
18	1	28	Helio Meza	Pinnacle Racing Group	Chevrolet	160	4	Running	28
19	20	05	David Smith	Shockwave Motorsports	Toyota	157	0	Running	25
20	10	4	Kyle Keller	Nascimento Motorsports	Chevrolet	145	0	Mechanical	24
21	22	51	Scotty Milan	Strike Mamba Raicng	Chevrolet	144	0	Running	23
22	3	25	Sam Corry	Nitro Motorsports	Toyota	112	0	Mechanical	22
23	12	15	Mia Lovell (R)	Nitro Motorsports	Toyota	34	0	Accident	21
24	25	31	T. J. Curran	Rise Racing	Chevrolet	20	0	Mechanical	20
25	24	38	Ray Bolinger	Kart Idaho Racing	Toyota	0	0	Did Not Start	19
Official race results

=== Race statistics ===
- Lead changes: 6 among 4 different drivers
- Cautions/Laps: 6 for 52 laps
- Red flags: 0
- Time of race: 1 hour, 6 minutes and 10 seconds
- Average speed: 56.788 miles per hour (91.391 km/h)

== Standings after the race ==
Drivers' Championship standings

	Pos	Driver	Points
	1	Trevor Huddleston	559
1	2	Robbie Kennealy	519 (–40)
1	3	Mason Massey	516 (–43)
1	4	Cole Denton	496 (–63)
1	5	Hailie Deegan	493 (–66)
	6	Eric Johnson Jr.	490 (–69)
	7	Andrew Chapman	470 (–89)
	8	Mia Lovell	449 (–110)
	9	Gavin Ray	449 (–110)
	10	David Smith	398 (–161)

- Note: Only the first 10 positions are included for the driver standings.

Previous race: 2026 Madera 150	ARCA Menards Series West; 2026 season	Next race: 2026 Desert Diamond Casino West Valley 100
