= 2026 JR & CO. 150 =

ARCA Menards Series and ARCA Menards Series East combination race at Iowa Speedway

Race details
- Race 14 of 20 in the 2026 ARCA Menards Series; Race 7 of 8 in the 2026 ARCA Menards Series East
- Date: August 7, 2026
- Location: Iowa Speedway in Newton, Iowa
- Course: Permanent racing facility
- Course length: 0.875 miles (1.408 km)
- Distance: 150 laps, 131.25 mi (211.23 km)
- Average speed: 83.940 miles per hour (135.088 km/h)

Pole position
Driver	Tristan McKee	Pinnacle Racing Group
- Time: 23.383

Most laps led
Driver	Tristan McKee	Pinnacle Racing Group
- Laps: 125

Fastest lap
Driver	Tristan McKee	Pinnacle Racing Group
- Time: 23.930

Winner
No. 77	Tristan McKee	Pinnacle Racing Group

Television in the United States
- Network: FS1
- Announcers: Brent Stover and Phil Parsons

Radio in the United States
- Radio: MRN
- Booth announcers: Alex Hayden and Mike Bagley
- Turn announcers: Kurt Becker (Turns 2 & 3)

The 2026 JR & CO. 150 was an ARCA Menards Series and ARCA Menards Series East combination race held on Friday, August 7, 2026, at Iowa Speedway in Newton, Iowa. Contested over 150 laps on the 0.875-mile (1.408 km) oval, it was the 14th race of the 2026 ARCA Menards Series season, the 7th race of the 2026 ARCA Menards Series East season, and the 5th running of the event.

Tristan McKee, driving for Pinnacle Racing Group, pulled off a dominating performance, holding off teammate Carson Brown and leading a race-high 125 laps from the pole position to earn his third career ARCA Menards Series win, his second of the season, and his fourth career ARCA Menards Series East win. Brown finished second, and Jake Bollman finished third. Max Reaves and Isaac Kitzmiller rounded out the top five, while Gavan Boschele, Thomas Annunziata, Andy Jankowiak, Ryan Vargas, and Jade Avedisian rounded out the top ten.

== Report ==
=== Background ===
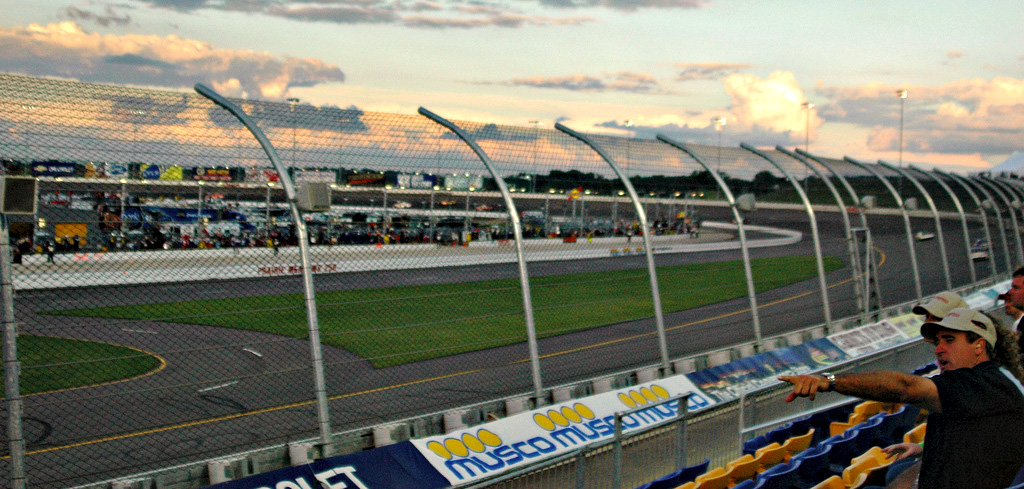
Iowa Speedway, the track where the race was held.

Iowa Speedway is a 7/8-mile (1.4 km) paved oval motor racing track in Newton, Iowa, United States, approximately 30 miles (48 km) east of Des Moines. The track was designed with influence from Rusty Wallace and patterned after Richmond Raceway, a short track where Wallace was very successful. It has over 25,000 permanent seats as well as a unique multi-tiered Recreational Vehicle viewing area along the backstretch. The track hosts the NTT IndyCar Series and NASCAR events.

After the 2020 race was canceled due to the pandemic, the race was removed from the 2021 schedule. In 2024, it was announced that the Xfinity Series would return to Iowa with a Cup Series race.

==== Entry list ====
- (R) denotes rookie driver.

#	Driver	Team	Make
0	Nate Moeller	Wayne Peterson Motorsports	Chevrolet
01	Tony Musolino	Fast Track Racing	Toyota
03	Alex Clubb	Clubb Racing Inc.	Ford
06	Ben Peterson	Wayne Peterson Motorsports	Toyota
7	Kadence Davenport	CCM Racing	Chevrolet
10	Craig Pellegrini Jr. (R)	Fast Track Racing	Toyota
11	Chase Buscaglia	Fast Track Racing	Ford
12	Takuma Koga	Fast Track Racing	Toyota
13	Brian Weber	Integrity Autosports	Toyota
15	Jade Avedisian	Nitro Motorsports	Toyota
18	Max Reaves (R)	Joe Gibbs Racing	Toyota
19	Austin Vaughn	Maples Motorsports	Ford
20	Jake Bollman (R)	Nitro Motorsports	Toyota
25	Gavan Boschele (R)	Nitro Motorsports	Toyota
28	Carson Brown (R)	Pinnacle Racing Group	Chevrolet
34	Brian Barbarow	VWV Racing	Toyota
38	Esteban Rodríguez	MCM Racing Development	Toyota
48	Brad Smith	Brad Smith Motorsports	Ford
55	Isabella Robusto	Nitro Motorsports	Toyota
70	Thomas Annunziata	Nitro Motorsports	Toyota
71	Andy Jankowiak	KLAS Motorsports	Chevrolet
77	Tristan McKee (R)	Pinnacle Racing Group	Chevrolet
79	Isaac Kitzmiller	ACR Motorsports	Chevrolet
81	Kevin Campbell	KC Motorsports	Chevrolet
83	Brayton Laster	Clubb Racing Inc.	Ford
85	Quinn Davis (R)	City Garage Motorsports	Ford
86	Jeff Maconi (R)	Clubb Racing Inc.	Ford
89	Bobby Dale Earnhardt	Rise Racing	Chevrolet
90	Ty Fredrickson	Team 36 with Nitro Motorsports	Toyota
91	Ryan Vargas	Maples Motorsports	Ford
95	Jackson McLerran (R)	MAN Motorsports	Toyota
97	Jason Kitzmiller	CR7 Motorsports	Chevrolet
99	Michael Maples	Maples Motorsports	Chevrolet
Official entry list

== Practice ==
The first and only practice session was held on Friday, August 7, at 2:30 PM CST, and lasted for 45 minutes.

Carson Brown, driving for Pinnacle Racing Group, set the fastest time in the session, with a lap of 23.507 seconds, and a speed of 134.003 miles per hour (215.657 km/h).

Pos.	#	Driver	Team	Make	Time	Speed
1	28	Carson Brown (R)	Pinnacle Racing Group	Chevrolet	23.507	134.003
2	77	Tristan McKee (R)	Pinnacle Racing Group	Chevrolet	23.522	133.917
3	79	Isaac Kitzmiller	ACR Motorsports	Chevrolet	23.761	132.570
Full practice results

== Qualifying ==
Qualifying was held on Friday, August 7, at 3:30 PM CST. The qualifying procedure used was a multi-car, multi-lap based system. All drivers were on track for a 20-minute timed session, and whoever set the fastest time in the session won the pole.

Tristan McKee, driving for Pinnacle Racing Group, qualified on pole position with a lap of 23.383 seconds, and a speed of 134.713 miles per hour (216.800 km/h).

=== Qualifying results ===
Pos.	#	Driver	Team	Make	Time	Speed
1	77	Tristan McKee (R)	Pinnacle Racing Group	Chevrolet	23.383	134.713
2	28	Carson Brown (R)	Pinnacle Racing Group	Chevrolet	23.514	133.963
3	79	Isaac Kitzmiller	ACR Motorsports	Chevrolet	23.657	133.153
4	70	Thomas Annunziata	Nitro Motorsports	Toyota	23.793	132.392
5	20	Jake Bollman (R)	Nitro Motorsports	Toyota	23.890	131.854
6	18	Max Reaves (R)	Joe Gibbs Racing	Toyota	23.943	131.562
7	15	Jade Avedisian	Nitro Motorsports	Toyota	24.026	131.108
8	90	Ty Fredrickson	Team 36 with Nitro Motorsports	Toyota	24.087	130.776
9	25	Gavan Boschele (R)	Nitro Motorsports	Toyota	24.159	130.386
10	97	Jason Kitzmiller	CR7 Motorsports	Chevrolet	24.235	129.977
11	71	Andy Jankowiak	KLAS Motorsports	Toyota	24.238	129.961
12	55	Isabella Robusto	Nitro Motorsports	Toyota	24.256	129.865
13	95	Jackson McLerran (R)	MAN Motorsports	Toyota	24.510	128.519
14	91	Ryan Vargas	Maples Motorsports	Ford	24.619	127.950
15	38	Toro Rodríguez	MCM Racing Development	Toyota	24.674	127.665
16	10	Craig Pellegrini Jr. (R)	Fast Track Racing	Toyota	25.091	125.543
17	85	Quinn Davis (R)	City Garage Motorsports	Ford	25.149	125.253
18	12	Takuma Koga	Fast Track Racing	Toyota	25.556	123.259
19	89	Bobby Dale Earnhardt	Rise Racing	Chevrolet	25.744	122.359
20	13	Brian Weber	Integrity Autosports	Toyota	25.885	121.692
21	01	Tony Musolino	Fast Track Racing	Toyota	26.123	120.583
22	48	Brad Smith	Brad Smith Motorsports	Ford	26.293	119.804
23	99	Michael Maples	Maples Motorsports	Chevrolet	26.471	118.998
24	19	Austin Vaughn	Maples Motorsports	Ford	26.614	118.359
25	03	Alex Clubb	Clubb Racing Inc.	Ford	27.392	114.997
26	06	Ben Peterson	Wayne Peterson Motorsports	Toyota	27.600	114.130
27	34	Brian Barbarow	VWV Racing	Toyota	27.792	113.342
28	86	Jeff Maconi (R)	Clubb Racing Inc.	Ford	27.813	113.256
29	83	Brayton Laster	Clubb Racing Inc.	Ford	28.287	111.359
30	0	Nate Moeller	Wayne Peterson Motorsports	Chevrolet	32.282	97.578
31	81	Kevin Campbell	KC Motorsports	Chevrolet	41.819	75.325
32	11	Chase Buscaglia	Fast Track Racing	Ford	—	—
33	7	Kadence Davenport	CCM Racing	Chevrolet	—	—
Official qualifying results

== Race ==
=== Race results ===
Laps: 150

Fin	St	#	Driver	Team	Make	Laps	Led	Status	Pts
1	1	77	Tristan McKee (R)	Pinnacle Racing Group	Chevrolet	150	125	Running	49
2	2	28	Carson Brown (R)	Pinnacle Racing Group	Chevrolet	150	25	Running	43
3	5	20	Jake Bollman (R)	Nitro Motorsports	Toyota	150	0	Running	41
4	6	18	Max Reaves (R)	Joe Gibbs Racing	Toyota	150	0	Running	40
5	3	79	Isaac Kitzmiller	ACR Motorsports	Chevrolet	150	0	Running	39
6	9	25	Gavan Boschele (R)	Nitro Motorsports	Toyota	150	0	Running	38
7	4	70	Thomas Annunziata	Nitro Motorsports	Toyota	150	0	Running	37
8	11	71	Andy Jankowiak	KLAS Motorsports	Toyota	150	0	Running	36
9	14	91	Ryan Vargas	Maples Motorsports	Ford	150	0	Running	35
10	7	15	Jade Avedisian	Nitro Motorsports	Toyota	148	0	Running	34
11	12	55	Isabella Robusto	Nitro Motorsports	Toyota	148	0	Running	33
12	8	90	Ty Fredrickson	Team 36 with Nitro Motorsports	Toyota	148	0	Running	32
13	15	38	Toro Rodríguez	MCM Racing Development	Toyota	147	0	Running	31
14	16	10	Craig Pellegrini Jr. (R)	Fast Track Racing	Toyota	146	0	Running	30
15	17	85	Quinn Davis (R)	City Garage Motorsports	Ford	146	0	Running	29
16	19	89	Bobby Dale Earnhardt	Rise Racing	Chevrolet	145	0	Running	28
17	20	13	Brian Weber	Integrity Autosports	Toyota	144	0	Running	27
18	21	01	Tony Musolino	Fast Track Racing	Toyota	142	0	Running	26
19	24	19	Austin Vaughn	Maples Motorsports	Ford	141	0	Running	25
20	23	99	Michael Maples	Maples Motorsports	Chevrolet	141	0	Running	24
21	27	34	Brian Barbarow	VWV Racing	Toyota	140	0	Running	23
22	25	03	Alex Clubb	Clubb Racing Inc.	Ford	139	0	Running	22
23	29	11	Chase Buscaglia	Fast Track Racing	Ford	138	0	Running	21
24	28	86	Jeff Maconi (R)	Clubb Racing Inc.	Ford	138	0	Running	20
25	10	97	Jason Kitzmiller	CR7 Motorsports	Chevrolet	133	0	Accident	19
26	26	06	Ben Peterson	Wayne Peterson Motorsports	Toyota	133	0	Running	18
27	18	12	Takuma Koga	Fastt Track Racing	Toyota	131	0	Running	17
28	13	95	Jackson McLerran (R)	MAN Motorsports	Toyota	68	0	Mechanical	16
29	22	48	Brad Smith	Brad Smith Motorsports	Ford	64	0	Accident	15
30	30	0	Nate Moeller	Wayne Peterson Motorsports	Chevrolet	19	0	Mechanical	14
31	29	83	Brayton Laster	Clubb Racing Inc.	Ford	12	0	Mechanical	13
32	31	81	Kevin Campbell	KC Motorsports	Chevrolet	3	0	Mechanical	12
33	33	7	Kadence Davenport	CCM Racing	Chevrolet	2	0	Mechanical	11
Official race results

=== Race statistics ===
- Lead changes: 2 among 2 different drivers
- Cautions/Laps: 7 for 46 laps
- Red flags: 0
- Time of race: 1 hour, 33 minutes and 49 seconds
- Average speed: 83.940 miles per hour (135.088 km/h)

== Standings after the race ==
Drivers' Championship standings (ARCA Main)

	Pos	Driver	Points
	1	Jake Bollman	623
	2	Thomas Annunziata	616 (–7)
1	3	Isabella Robusto	512 (–111)
1	4	Jason Kitzmiller	510 (–113)
	5	Takuma Koga	476 (–147)
	6	Michael Maples	437 (–186)
	7	Alex Clubb	426 (–197)
	8	Bobby Dale Earnhardt	410 (–213)
1	9	Andy Jankowiak	366 (–257)
1	10	Brad Smith	364 (–259)

Drivers' Championship standings (ARCA East)

	Pos	Driver	Points
1	1	Tristan McKee	340
1	2	Max Reaves	338 (–2)
	3	Isaac Kitzmiller	322 (–18)
	4	Craig Pellegrini Jr.	283 (–57)
1	5	Quinn Davis	262 (–78)
1	6	Jackson McLerran	260 (–80)
	7	Austin Vaughn	256 (–84)
1	8	Carson Brown	233 (–107)
1	9	Nate Moeller	231 (–109)
	10	Michael Maples	208 (–132)

- Note: Only the first 10 positions are included for the driver standings.

Previous race: 2026 LiUNA! 150 (ARCA)	ARCA Menards Series; 2026 season	Next race: 2026 Calypso 100

Previous race: 2026 Sunbelt Rentals 150	ARCA Menards Series East; 2026 season	Next race: 2026 Bush's Best 200
