= Tristan McKee =

American racing driver (born 2010)

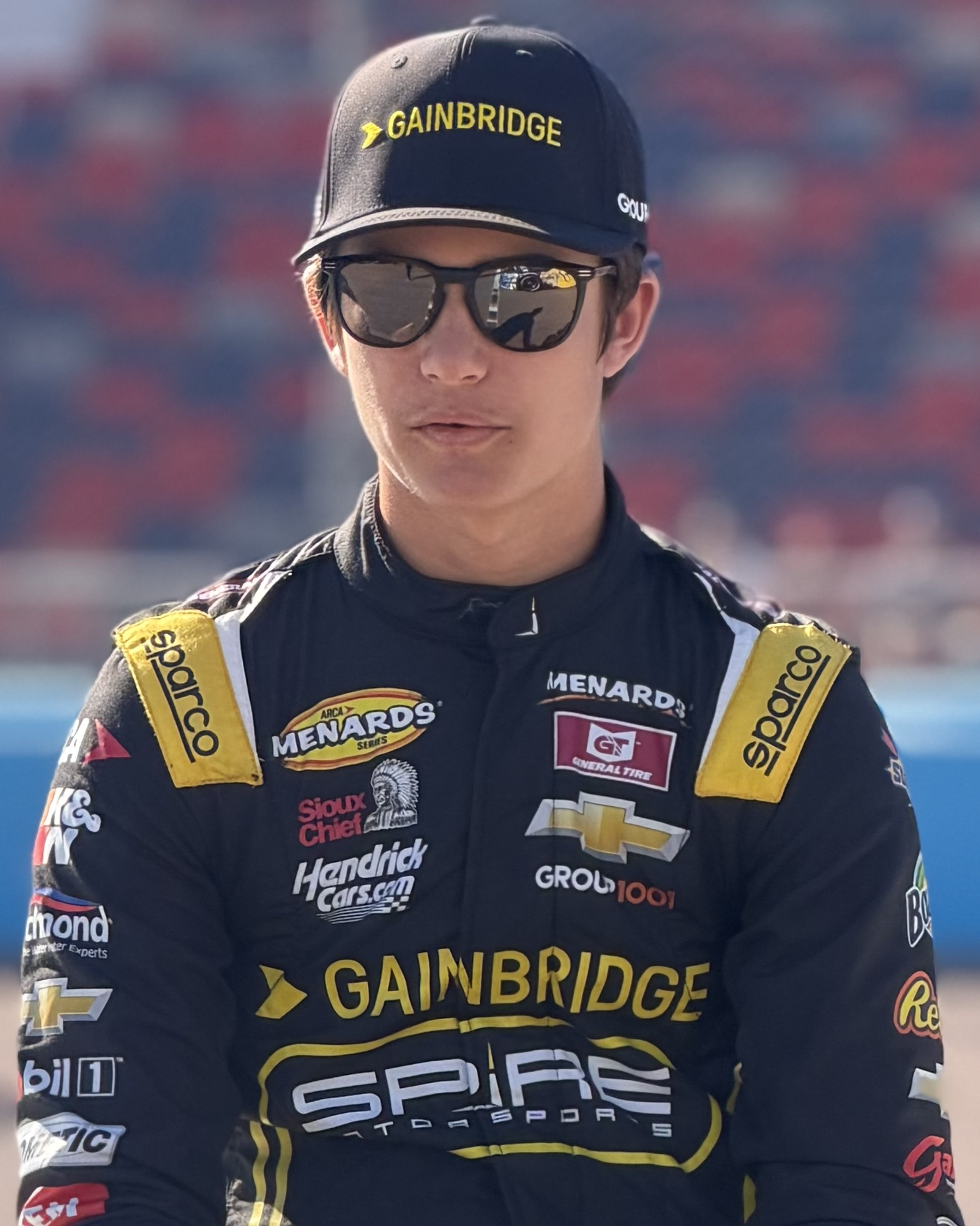
- McKee at Phoenix Raceway in 2025
- Born: August 3, 2010 (age 16); Williamsburg, Virginia, U.S.
- Height: 5 ft 11 in (1.80 m)
- Achievements: 2026 ARCA Menards Series East Champion; 2025 Cube 3 Architecture TA2 Series Champion; 2020 INEX Summer Shootout Bandolero Bandit Champion; 2020 Thursday Thunder Bandolero Bandit Champion; 2026 Battle at Berlin Winner; Records: Youngest driver to ever finish top-five in a NASCAR Craftsman Truck Series race Youngest NASCAR Truck Series pole sitter (16 years, 2 months, and 27 days in 2026)

NASCAR FedEx Freight Truck Series career
- 5 races run over 1 year
- Truck no., team: No. 7 (Spire Motorsports)
- 2026 position: 27th
- Best finish: 27th (2026)
- First race: 2026 Black's Tire 250 (Richmond)
- Last race: 2026 Black's Tire 200 (Martinsville)
Wins	Top tens	Poles
0	4	1

ARCA Menards Series career
- 13 races run over 2 years
- Best finish: 17th (2026)
- First race: 2025 General Tire 100 at The Glen (Watkins Glen)
- Last race: 2026 Bush's Best 200 (Bristol)
- First win: 2025 General Tire 100 at The Glen (Watkins Glen)
- Last win: 2026 Atlas 200 (Madison)
Wins	Top tens	Poles
4	10	1

ARCA Menards Series East career
- 9 races run over 2 years
- Best finish: 1st (2026)
- First race: 2025 Bush's Beans 200 (Bristol)
- Last race: 2026 Bush's Best 200 (Bristol)
- First win: 2026 Cook Out 200 (Hickory)
- Last win: 2026 JR & CO. 150 (Iowa)
Wins	Top tens	Poles
4	8	2

ARCA Menards Series West career
- 2 races run over 2 years
- Best finish: 44th (2025, 2026)
- First race: 2025 Desert Diamond Casino West Valley 100 (Phoenix)
- Last race: 2026 General Tire 150 (Phoenix)
Wins	Top tens	Poles
0	2	0
- Statistics up to date as of November 6, 2026.

Tristan McKee (born August 3, 2010) is an American professional stock car racing driver. He currently competes part-time in the NASCAR Truck Series, driving the No. 7 Chevrolet Silverado RST for Spire Motorsports, and part-time in the NASCAR O'Reilly Auto Parts Series, driving the No. 9 Chevrolet Camaro SS for JR Motorsports.

McKee is the 2026 ARCA Menards Series East champion.

== Racing career ==
McKee has previously competed in series such as the CARS Pro Late Model Tour, where he became the series' youngest winner at Dillon Motor Speedway in 2023 at the age of twelve, the CARS Late Model Stock Tour, the Carolina Pro Late Model Series, and the All-Pro Limited Late Model Series.

On January 16, 2025, it was announced that McKee had signed with Spire Motorsports as a development driver. In this deal, McKee would run a partial schedule in the CARS Tour in the Late Model Stock Tour and the Pro Late Model Tour, where he would drive for Matt Piercy Racing, a full schedule in the Trans Am Series, where he would drive for Team SLR, and select races in the ARCA Menards Series.

=== ARCA Menards Series ===
On July 24, 2025, it was announced that McKee would make his debut in the ARCA Menards Series at Watkins Glen International, driving the No. 77 Chevrolet for Spire Motorsports. McKee started fourth in his debut race, going on to win the race in his first career ARCA start. He was the second-youngest winner in ARCA history at fifteen years and five days. On August 19, it was announced that McKee would run for Pinnacle Racing Group in the No. 82 Chevrolet for three races in ARCA, beginning at Madison International Speedway.

In 2026, McKee ran part-time with PRG and won the ARCA / ARCA East combination races at Toledo and Iowa. In the main series standalone events, he won at Madison.

==== ARCA Menards Series East ====
On December 17, 2025, it was announced that McKee would run half of the ARCA Menards Series schedule, as well as full-time in the ARCA Menards Series East, driving the No. 77 for PRG. He won at Hickory, Rockingham and the ARCA / ARCA East combination races at Toledo and Iowa. At the season's end with a second-place finish at Bristol, he earned the 2026 ARCA Menards Series East championship title over Max Reaves.

==== ARCA Menards Series West ====
In 2025, McKee would also make his debut in the ARCA Menards Series West for Spire at the season ending race at Phoenix Raceway. He would end up finishing fourth. The next year, he ran at Phoenix in the spring and finished runner-up to Carson Brown.

=== NASCAR ===
==== Craftsman Truck Series ====
On July 30, 2026, it was announced that McKee will make multiple starts in the NASCAR Craftsman Truck Series, his first being at Richmond Raceway, driving the No. 77 Chevrolet for Spire Motorsports. In his first three starts, he scored three top-tens, as well as in Bristol, he became the youngest driver to ever finish in the top-five in a Truck Series race. He also won the pole at Martinsville, becoming the youngest pole winner in series history at 16 years, 2 months, and 27 days old.

On September 30, 2026, it was announced that McKee will return to Spire in an expanded schedule for the 2027 season.

==== O'Reilly Auto Parts Series ====
On October 16, 2026, it was announced that McKee will drive a partial schedule for JR Motorsports in 2027 and 2028 before running full-time in 2029.

== Personal life ==
McKee's father, Lane, is a former motorcycle racer.

== Motorsports career results ==
=== Stock car career summary ===
Season	Series	Team	Races	Wins	Top 5	Top 10	Points	Position
2023	CARS Pro Late Model Tour	N/A	9	1	1	5	195	9th
2024	CARS Pro Late Model Tour	Setzer Racing & Development	13	2	5	7	323	5th
2024	CARS Late Model Stock Car Tour	Tristan McKee Inc.	2	0	0	1	0	N/A
2025	CARS Pro Late Model Tour	LowCountry Motorsports	7	1	3	5	252	9th
2025	CARS Late Model Stock Car Tour	Matt Piercy Racing	6	0	3	3	320	15th
2025	CARS Late Model Stock Car Tour	LowCountry Motorsports	4	0	1	3	320	15th
2025	ARCA Menards Series West	Spire Motorsports	1	0	1	1	40	44th
2025	ARCA Menards Series East	Pinnacle Racing Group	1	0	1	1	42	47th
2025	ARCA Menards Series	Spire Motorsports	1	1	1	1	163	25th
2025	ARCA Menards Series	Pinnacle Racing Group	3	0	2	2	163	25th
2026	ASA STARS National Tour	Wauters Motorsports	10	0	2	7		
2026	ARCA Menards Series West	Pinnacle Racing Group	1	0	1	1	42	44th
2026	ARCA Menards Series East	Pinnacle Racing Group	8	4	7	7	431	**1st**
2026	ARCA Menards Series	Pinnacle Racing Group	9	3	5	7	337	17th
2026	NASCAR Craftsman Truck Series	Spire Motorsports	5	0	2	4	177	27th

=== NASCAR ===
(key) (Bold – Pole position awarded by qualifying time. Italics – Pole position earned by points standings or practice time. * – Most laps led.)

==== Craftsman Truck Series ====
NASCAR Craftsman Truck Series results
Year	Team	No.	Make	1	2	3	4	5	6	7	8	9	10	11	12	13	14	15	16	17	18	19	20	21	22	23	24	25	NCTC	Pts	Ref
2026	Spire Motorsports	77	Chevy	DAY	ATL	STP	DAR	CAR	BRI	TEX	GLN	DOV	CLT	NSH	MCH	COR	LRP	NWS	IRP	RCH; 8	NHA; 6	BRI; 5	KAN	CLT	PHO; 14	TAL	**MAR**; 5	HOM	27th	177	

=== ARCA Menards Series ===
(key) (Bold – Pole position awarded by qualifying time. Italics – Pole position earned by points standings or practice time. * – Most laps led. ** – All laps led.)

ARCA Menards Series results
Year	Team	No.	Make	1	2	3	4	5	6	7	8	9	10	11	12	13	14	15	16	17	18	19	20	AMSC	Pts	Ref
2025	Spire Motorsports	77	Chevy	DAY	PHO	TAL	KAN	CLT	MCH	BLN	ELK	LRP	DOV	IRP	IOW	GLN; 1	ISF							25th	163	
2025	Pinnacle Racing Group	82	Chevy															MAD; 11	DSF	BRI; 2	SLM	KAN	TOL; 3	25th	163	
2026	Pinnacle Racing Group	77	Chevy	DAY	PHO; 2	KAN	TAL	GLN; 18	TOL; 1*	MCH	POC	BER	ELK	CHI	LRP; 7	IRP; 32	**IOW**; 1*	ISF	MAD; 1*	DSF	SLM; 6	BRI; 2	KAN	17th	337	

==== ARCA Menards Series East ====
ARCA Menards Series East results
Year	Team	No.	Make	1	2	3	4	5	6	7	8	AMSEC	Pts	Ref
2025	Pinnacle Racing Group	82	Chevy	FIF	CAR	NSV	FRS	DOV	IRP	IOW	BRI; 2	47th	42	
2026	Pinnacle Racing Group	77	Chevy	HCY; 1	**CAR**; 1**	NSV; 3	TOL; 1*	IRP; 32	FRS; 2	**IOW**; 1*	BRI; 2	1st	431	

==== ARCA Menards Series West ====
ARCA Menards Series West results
Year	Team	No.	Make	1	2	3	4	5	6	7	8	9	10	11	12	13	AMSWC	Pts	Ref
2025	Spire Motorsports	77	Chevy	KER	PHO	TUC	CNS	KER	SON	TRI	PIR	AAS	MAD	LVS	PHO; 4		44th	40	
2026	Pinnacle Racing Group	77	Chevy	KER	PHO; 2	TUC	SHA	CNS	TRI	SON	PIR	AAS	MAD	LVS	PHO	KER	44th	42	

=== CARS Late Model Stock Car Tour ===
(key) (Bold – Pole position awarded by qualifying time. Italics – Pole position earned by points standings or practice time. * – Most laps led. ** – All laps led.)

CARS Late Model Stock Car Tour results
Year	Team	No.	Make	1	2	3	4	5	6	7	8	9	10	11	12	13	14	15	16	17	CLMSCTC	Pts	Ref
2024	Tristan McKee Inc.	7M	Chevy	SNM	HCY	AAS	OCS	ACE	TCM	LGY	DOM	CRW	HCY	NWS; 20	ACE	WCS	FLC	SBO	TCM	NWS; 7	N/A	0	
2025	Matt Piercy Racing	7	Chevy	AAS; 18	WCS; 19	CDL; 19	OCS	ACE	NWS; 2	LGY; 4	DOM; 4										15th	320	
2025	LowCountry Motorsports	7	Chevy									CRW; 3	**HCY**; 22*	AND; 7	FLC	SBO; 7	TCM	NWS			15th	320	

=== CARS Pro Late Model Tour ===
(key)

CARS Pro Late Model Tour results
Year	Team	No.	Make	1	2	3	4	5	6	7	8	9	10	11	12	13	CPLMTC	Pts	Ref
2023	N/A	7	Chevy	SNM; 24													9th	195	
2023	N/A	7	Ford		HCY; 10	ACE; 20	NWS; 4	TCM; 7	DIL; 1	CRW; 8	WKS; DNS	HCY; 16	TCM; 16	SBO	TCM	CRW	9th	195	
2024	Setzer Racing & Development	6	Chevy	SNM; 4	HCY; 24	OCS; 9	ACE; 7	TCM; 15	**CRW**; 1**	HCY; 15	NWS; 1*				**TCM**; 16*	NWS; 15	5th	323	
2024	Setzer Racing & Development	6M	Chevy									ACE; 12*	**FLC**; 4	SBO; 2*			5th	323	
2025	LowCountry Motorsports	7	Chevy	**AAS**; 2*	CDL; 1	OCS	ACE		CRW; 16	HCY	HCY; 3	AND; 15	FLC	SBO; 7	TCM	NWS; Wth	9th	252	
2025	LowCountry Motorsports	7M	Chevy					NWS; 6									9th	252	

=== ASA STARS National Tour ===
(key) (Bold – Pole position awarded by qualifying time. Italics – Pole position earned by points standings or practice time. * – Most laps led. ** – All laps led.)

ASA STARS National Tour results
Year	Team	No.	Make	1	2	3	4	5	6	7	8	9	10	11	ASNTC	Pts	Ref
2026	Wauters Motorsports	5	Chevy	NSM; 3	FIF; 7	HCY; 7	SLG; 6	MAD; 6*	NPS; 14	OWO; 13	TRI; 20	WIN; 4	NSV; 9	NSM; Wth	-*	-*	
