= 2026 Sunbelt Rentals 150 =

ARCA Menards Series East race at Flat Rock Speedway

Race details
- Race 6 of 8 in the 2026 ARCA Menards Series East
- Date: August 1, 2026
- Location: Flat Rock Speedway in Ash Township, Michigan
- Course: Permanent racing facility
- Course length: 0.25 miles (0.40 km)
- Distance: 150 laps, 37.5 mi (60.35 km)
- Average speed: 56.485 miles per hour (90.904 km/h)

Pole position
| Driver | Carson Brown | Pinnacle Racing Group |
- Time: 11.948

Most laps led
| Driver | Max Reaves | Joe Gibbs Racing |
- Laps: 130

Fastest lap
| Driver | Max Reaves | Joe Gibbs Racing |
- Time: 12.247

Winner
| No. 18 | Max Reaves | Joe Gibbs Racing |

Television in the United States
- Network: FloRacing
- Announcers: Charles Krall and Ryan Vargas

Radio in the United States
- Radio: ARN

The 2026 Sunbelt Rentals 150 was an ARCA Menards Series East race held on Saturday, August 1, 2026, at Flat Rock Speedway in Ash Township, Michigan. Contested over 150 laps on the 0.25-mile (0.40 km) short track, it was the sixth race of the 2026 ARCA Menards Series East season, and the fourth running of the event.

Max Reaves, driving for Joe Gibbs Racing, pulled off a dominating performance, leading a race-high 130 laps from the third position and surviving a chaotic late restart to earn his fifth career ARCA Menards Series East win, and his second of the season. Tristan McKee finished second, and Isaac Kitzmiller finished third. Matt Kemp and Quinn Davis rounded out the top five, while Toro Rodríguez, Austin Vaughn, Jackson McLerran, Craig Pellegrini Jr., and Blaine Donahue rounded out the top ten.

== Report ==
=== Background ===
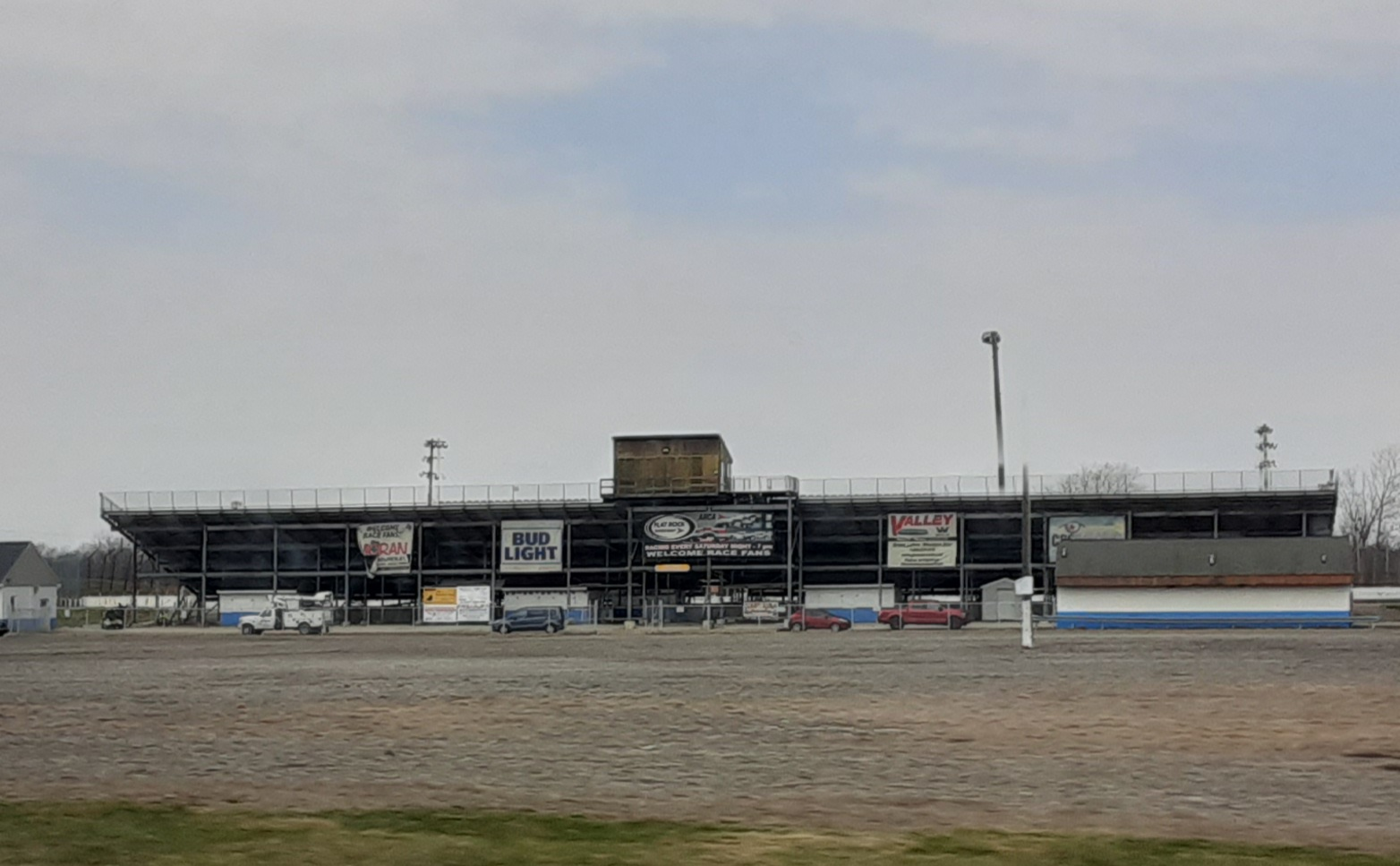
Flat Rock Speedway, the track where the race was held.

Flat Rock Speedway is a race track in Monroe County in the U.S. state of Michigan. It is located in Ash Township just south of the city of Flat Rock along U.S. Route 24. Opened in 1953, it is owned by NASCAR and is the sister track to Toledo Speedway. It features racing on Saturday nights that include Outlaw Body Late Models, Street Stocks, and Figure 8s for its weekly divisions. It is the closest NASCAR-style oval track racing circuit to Detroit, Michigan.

==== Entry list ====
- (R) denotes rookie driver.

| # | Driver | Team | Make |
|---|---|---|---|
| 00 | Toby Blanton | Jet Daddy Racing | Chevrolet |
| 03 | Alex Clubb | Clubb Racing Inc. | Ford |
| 5 | Michael Clayton | City Garage Motorsports | Ford |
| 06 | Nate Moeller | Wayne Peterson Motorsports | Toyota |
| 10 | Craig Pellegrini Jr. (R) | Fast Track Racing | Toyota |
| 11 | Blaine Donahue | Fast Track Racing | Ford |
| 12 | Dan Boys | Fast Track Racing | Toyota |
| 13 | Rita Goulet | Integrity Autosports | Toyota |
| 18 | Max Reaves (R) | Joe Gibbs Racing | Toyota |
| 19 | Austin Vaughn | Maples Motorsports | Ford |
| 28 | Carson Brown (R) | Pinnacle Racing Group | Chevrolet |
| 34 | Brian Barbarow | VWV Racing | Toyota |
| 38 | Toro Rodríguez | MCM Racing Development | Toyota |
| 65 | Jeffery MacZink | MacZink Racing | Toyota |
| 77 | Tristan McKee (R) | Pinnacle Racing Group | Chevrolet |
| 79 | Isaac Kitzmiller | ACR Motorsports | Chevrolet |
| 85 | Quinn Davis (R) | City Garage Motorsports | Ford |
| 86 | Alex Malycke | Clubb Racing Inc. | Ford |
| 91 | Matt Kemp | Maples Motorsports | Chevrolet |
| 95 | Jackson McLerran (R) | MAN Motorsports | Toyota |
| 99 | Michael Maples | Maples Motorsports | Chevrolet |
Official entry list

== Practice ==
The first and only practice session was held on Saturday, August 1, at 2:15 PM EST, and lasted for 45 minutes.

Carson Brown, driving for Pinnacle Racing Group, set the fastest time in the session, with a lap of 12.451 seconds, and a speed of 72.283 miles per hour (116.328 km/h).

| Pos. | # | Driver | Team | Make | Time | Speed |
|---|---|---|---|---|---|---|
| 1 | 28 | Carson Brown (R) | Pinnacle Racing Group | Chevrolet | 12.451 | 72.283 |
| 2 | 18 | Max Reaves (R) | Joe Gibbs Racing | Toyota | 12.516 | 71.908 |
| 3 | 19 | Austin Vaughn | Maples Motorsports | Ford | 12.540 | 71.770 |
Full practice results

== Qualifying ==
Qualifying was held on Saturday, August 1, at 4:00 PM EST. The qualifying procedure used was a single-car, two-lap based system. All drivers were on track by themselves and had two laps to post a qualifying time, and whoever set the fastest time won the pole.

Carson Brown, driving for Pinnacle Racing Group, qualified on pole position with a lap of 11.948 seconds, and a speed of 75.326 miles per hour (121.225 km/h).

=== Qualifying results ===
| Pos. | # | Driver | Team | Make | Time | Speed |
|---|---|---|---|---|---|---|
| 1 | 28 | Carson Brown (R) | Pinnacle Racing Group | Chevrolet | 11.948 | 75.326 |
| 2 | 77 | Tristan McKee (R) | Pinnacle Racing Group | Chevrolet | 12.113 | 74.300 |
| 3 | 18 | Max Reaves (R) | Joe Gibbs Racing | Toyota | 12.166 | 73.977 |
| 4 | 79 | Isaac Kitzmiller | ACR Motorsports | Chevrolet | 12.213 | 73.692 |
| 5 | 85 | Quinn Davis (R) | City Garage Motorsports | Ford | 12.364 | 72.792 |
| 6 | 91 | Matt Kemp | Maples Motorsports | Chevrolet | 12.477 | 72.133 |
| 7 | 95 | Jackson McLerran (R) | MAN Motorsports | Toyota | 12.481 | 72.110 |
| 8 | 11 | Blaine Donahue | Fast Track Racing | Ford | 12.648 | 71.157 |
| 9 | 65 | Jeffery MacZink | MacZink Racing | Toyota | 12.687 | 70.939 |
| 10 | 38 | Toro Rodríguez | MCM Racing Development | Toyota | 12.917 | 69.676 |
| 11 | 10 | Craig Pellegrini Jr. (R) | Fast Track Racing | Toyota | 12.928 | 69.616 |
| 12 | 19 | Austin Vaughn | Maples Motorsports | Ford | 13.107 | 68.666 |
| 13 | 06 | Nate Moeller | Wayne Peterson Motorsports | Toyota | 13.309 | 67.623 |
| 14 | 5 | Michael Clayton | City Garage Motorsports | Ford | 13.464 | 66.845 |
| 15 | 34 | Brian Barbarow | VWV Racing | Toyota | 13.494 | 66.696 |
| 16 | 03 | Alex Clubb | Clubb Racing Inc. | Ford | 13.666 | 65.857 |
| 17 | 86 | Alex Malycke | Clubb Racing Inc. | Ford | 13.871 | 64.884 |
| 18 | 12 | Dan Boys | Fast Track Racing | Toyota | 13.935 | 64.586 |
| 19 | 00 | Toby Blanton | Jet Daddy Racing | Chevrolet | 14.816 | 60.745 |
| 20 | 13 | Rita Goulet | Integrity Autosports | Toyota | — | — |
| 21 | 99 | Michael Maples | Maples Motorsports | Chevrolet | — | — |
Official qualifying results

== Race ==
=== Race results ===
Laps: 150

| Fin | St | # | Driver | Team | Make | Laps | Led | Status | Pts |
|---|---|---|---|---|---|---|---|---|---|
| 1 | 3 | 18 | Max Reaves (R) | Joe Gibbs Racing | Toyota | 150 | 130 | Running | 47 |
| 2 | 2 | 77 | Tristan McKee (R) | Pinnacle Racing Group | Chevrolet | 150 | 5 | Running | 43 |
| 3 | 4 | 79 | Isaac Kitzmiller | ACR Motorsports | Chevrolet | 150 | 2 | Running | 42 |
| 4 | 6 | 91 | Matt Kemp | Maples Motorsports | Chevrolet | 150 | 0 | Running | 40 |
| 5 | 5 | 85 | Quinn Davis (R) | City Garage Motorsports | Ford | 149 | 0 | Running | 39 |
| 6 | 10 | 38 | Toro Rodríguez | MCM Racing Development | Toyota | 148 | 0 | Running | 38 |
| 7 | 12 | 19 | Austin Vaughn | Maples Motorsports | Ford | 147 | 0 | Running | 37 |
| 8 | 7 | 95 | Jackson McLerran (R) | MAN Motorsports | Toyota | 146 | 0 | Running | 36 |
| 9 | 11 | 10 | Craig Pellegrini Jr. (R) | Fast Track Racing | Toyota | 146 | 0 | Running | 35 |
| 10 | 8 | 11 | Blaine Donahue | Fast Track Racing | Ford | 146 | 0 | Running | 34 |
| 11 | 15 | 34 | Brian Barbarow | VWV Racing | Toyota | 145 | 0 | Running | 33 |
| 12 | 9 | 65 | Jeffery MacZink | MacZink Racing | Toyota | 144 | 0 | Running | 32 |
| 13 | 16 | 03 | Alex Clubb | Clubb Racing Inc. | Ford | 142 | 0 | Running | 31 |
| 14 | 13 | 06 | Nate Moeller | Wayne Peterson Motorsports | Toyota | 138 | 0 | Running | 30 |
| 15 | 20 | 13 | Rita Goulet | Integrity Autosports | Toyota | 138 | 0 | Running | 29 |
| 16 | 17 | 86 | Alex Malycke | Clubb Racing Inc. | Ford | 135 | 0 | Running | 28 |
| 17 | 19 | 00 | Toby Blanton | Jet Daddy Racing | Chevrolet | 131 | 0 | Running | 27 |
| 18 | 1 | 28 | Carson Brown (R) | Pinnacle Racing Group | Chevrolet | 123 | 13 | Running | 28 |
| 19 | 18 | 12 | Dan Boys | Fast Track Racing | Toyota | 40 | 0 | Mechanical | 25 |
| 20 | 14 | 5 | Michael Clayton | City Garage Motorsports | Ford | 31 | 0 | Mechanical | 24 |
| 21 | 21 | 99 | Michael Maples | Maples Motorsports | Chevrolet | 0 | 0 | Did Not Start | 23 |
Official race results

=== Race statistics ===
- Lead changes: 6 among 4 different drivers
- Cautions/Laps: 3 for 29 laps
- Red flags: 0
- Time of race: 39 minutes and 50 seconds
- Average speed: 56.485 miles per hour (90.904 km/h)

== Standings after the race ==
Drivers' Championship standings

| | Pos | Driver | Points |
|---|---|---|---|
| | 1 | Max Reaves | 297 |
| | 2 | Tristan McKee | 290 (–7) |
| | 3 | Isaac Kitzmiller | 283 (–14) |
| | 4 | Craig Pellegrini Jr. | 253 (–44) |
| | 5 | Jackson McLerran | 244 (–53) |
| 1 | 6 | Quinn Davis | 233 (–64) |
| 1 | 7 | Austin Vaughn | 231 (–66) |
| | 8 | Nate Moeller | 217 (–80) |
| | 9 | Carson Brown | 190 (–107) |
| | 10 | Michael Maples | 184 (–113) |

- Note: Only the first 10 positions are included for the driver standings.

| Previous race: 2026 LiUNA! 150 | ARCA Menards Series East; 2026 season | Next race: 2026 JR & CO. 150 |
