= City Garage Motorsports =

American stock car racing team

- Owner: Stuart Weiss
- Base: Lakeland, Florida
- Series: ARCA Menards Series; ARCA Menards Series East
- Race drivers: ARCA Menards Series: 5. Michael Clayton (part-time); 85. Quinn Davis (part-time); 86/34. Logan Misuraca (part-time); ARCA Menards Series East: 5. Michael Clayton (part-time); 85. Quinn Davis (R)
- Manufacturer: Ford

Career
- Debut: 2024
- Races competed: Total: 25; ARCA Menards Series: 13; ARCA Menards Series East: 12
- Drivers' Championships: Total: 0 ARCA Menards Series: 0 ARCA Menards Series East: 0
- Race victories: Total: 0 ARCA Menards Series: 0 ARCA Menards Series East: 0
- Pole positions: Total: 0 ARCA Menards Series: 0 ARCA Menards Series East: 0

City Garage Motorsports is an American professional auto racing team that currently competes in the ARCA Menards Series and the ARCA Menards Series East. Owner, Stuart Weiss, started the team in 2024. In the ARCA Menards Series and ARCA Menards Series East, they field the No. 5 for Michael Clayton, and the No. 85 for Quinn Davis. The team is based in Lakeland, Florida.

== ARCA Menards Series ==
=== Car No. 5 history ===
On June 10, 2025, it was revealed that CGM would run a second car, the No. 5, for Michael Clayton, the director of operations for CGM.

In 2026, Clayton returned to drive the No. 5 at Indianapolis Raceway Park.

==== Car No. 5 results ====
Year	Driver	No.	Make	1	2	3	4	5	6	7	8	9	10	11	12	13	14	15	16	17	18	19	20	AMSC	Pts	Ref
2025	Michael Clayton	5	Ford	DAY	PHO	TAL	KAN	CLT	MCH	BER; 22	ELK; 23	LRP	DOV	IRP; DNQ	IOW	GLN	ISF	MAD	DSF	BRI	SLM	KAN	TOL	53rd	46	
2026	Michael Clayton	5	Ford	DAY	PHO	KAN	TAL	GLN	TOL	MCH	POC	BER	ELK	CHI	LRP	IRP; 33	IOW	ISF	MAD	DSF	SLM	BRI	KAN	83rd	11	

=== Car No. 34 history ===
In 2026, CGM would partner with WAV Racing at Talladega to field the No. 34 with Logan Misuraca behind the wheel.

==== Car No. 34 results ====
Year	Driver	No.	Make	1	2	3	4	5	6	7	8	9	10	11	12	13	14	15	16	17	18	19	20	AMSC	Pts
2026	Logan Misuraca	34	Ford	DAY	PHO	KAN	TAL; 17	GLN	TOL	MCH	POC	BER	ELK	CHI	LRP	IRP	IOW	ISF	MAD	DSF	SLM	BRI	KAN		

=== Car No. 85 history ===
On April 9, 2024, it was announced that Becca Monopoli would attempt to make her ARCA debut at Lucas Oil Indianapolis Raceway Park, this time driving for the newly formed City Garage Motorsports in the No. 85 car.

On October 31, 2024, it was announced that Monopoli would drive part-time in 2025.

==== Car No. 85 results ====
Year	Driver	No.	Make	1	2	3	4	5	6	7	8	9	10	11	12	13	14	15	16	17	18	19	20	AMSC	Pts
2024	Becca Monopoli	85	Ford	DAY	PHO	TAL	DOV	KAN	CLT	IOW	MOH	BLN	IRP; 27	SLM	ELK	MCH	ISF	MLW	DSF	GLN	BRI	KAN	TOL; 11	68th	50
2025	Becca Monopoli	85	Ford	DAY	PHO	TAL	KAN	CLT	MCH	BER; 11	ELK; 16	LRP	DOV	IRP; 34	IOW	GLN	ISF	MAD	DSF	BRI	SLM	KAN	TOL; 10	39th	105
2026	Quinn Davis	85	Ford	DAY	PHO	KAN	TAL	GLN	TOL; 12	MCH	POC	BER	ELK	CHI	LRP	IRP; 11	IOW; 15	ISF	MAD	DSF	SLM	BRI; 25	KAN	37th	113

=== Car No. 86 history ===
In 2025, at Daytona and Talladega, CGM ran the No. 86, which was a CGM entry fielding Clubb Racing Inc.'s owner points.

In 2026, CGM would partner with Clubb again to field the No. 86 at Daytona with Logan Misuraca behind the wheel. However, she failed to quality for the race

==== Car No. 86 history ====
Year	Driver	No.	Make	1	2	3	4	5	6	7	8	9	10	11	12	13	14	15	16	17	18	19	20	AMSC	Pts
2025	Becca Monopoli	86	Toyota	DAY; 26	PHO																				
2025	Becca Monopoli	86	Ford			TAL; 37	KAN	CLT	MCH	BER	ELK	LRP	DOV	IRP	IOW	GLN	ISF	MAD	DSF	BRI	SLM	KAN	TOL		
2026	Logan Misuraca	86	Ford	DAY; DNQ	PHO	KAN	TAL	GLN	TOL	MCH	POC	BER	ELK	CHI	LRP	IRP	IOW	ISF	MAD	DSF	SLM	BRI	KAN		

== ARCA Menards Series East ==
=== Car No. 5 history ===
In 2025, CGM fielded the No. 5 car for the team's director of operations Michael Clayton at Indianapolis Raceway Park. However, he failed to qualify.

On September 19th, 2025, it was announced that Quinn Davis would run the No. 5 next season and compete for the ARCA Menards Series East championship. However, after Monopoli left the team, this would not be the case, as Davis would run the No. 85 instead, but still compete full-time. Clayton returned to drive the No. 5 at IRP and Flat Rock.

==== Car No. 5 results ====
Year	Driver	No.	Make	1	2	3	4	5	6	7	8	AMSEC	Pts
2025	Michael Clayton	5	Ford	FIF	CAR	NSH	FRS	DOV	IRP; DNQ	IOW	BRI		
2026	Michael Clayton	5	Ford	HCY	CAR	NSV	TOL	IRP; 33	FRS; 20	IOW	BRI	40th	35

=== Car No. 85 history ===
On April 9, 2024, it was announced that Monopoli would attempt to make her ARCA East debut at Lucas Oil Indianapolis Raceway Park, this time driving for the newly formed City Garage Motorsports in the No. 85 car.

On October 31, 2024, it was announced that Monopoli would attempt to race at Lucas Oil Indianapolis Raceway Park for the second year.

On August 19, 2025, it was announced that the team will run the No. 85 full-time in the East Series in 2026.

On September 19th, 2025, CGM announced that Monopoli would return to the No. 85 in 2026. However, Monopoli left the team, and it was later announced that Quinn Davis would run the No. 85 instead.

==== Car No. 85 results ====
Year	Driver	No.	Make	1	2	3	4	5	6	7	8	AMSEC	Pts
2024	Becca Monopoli	85	Ford	FIF	DOV	NSV	FRS	IOW	IRP; 27	MLW	BRI	58th	17
2025	Becca Monopoli	85	Ford	FIF; 14	CAR	NSH; 8	FRS	DOV	IRP; 34	IOW	BRI	29th	76
2026	Quinn Davis	85	Ford	HCY; 16	CAR; 21	NSV; 16	TOL; 12	IRP; 11	FRS; 5	IOW; 15	BRI; 25	6th	331
