= 2025 General Tire 150 (Dover) =

2025 ARCA Menards Series and ARCA Menards Series East combination race

Race details
- Race 10 of 20 of the 2025 ARCA Menards Series; Race 5 of 8 of the 2025 ARCA Menards Series East
- Date: July 18, 2025
- Official name: 2nd Annual General Tire 150
- Location: Dover Motor Speedway in Dover, Delaware
- Course: Permanent racing facility
- Course length: 1 miles (1.6 km)
- Distance: 150 laps, 150 mi (240 km)
- Scheduled distance: 150 laps, 150 mi (240 km)
- Average speed: 107.330 mph (172.731 km/h)

Pole position
Driver	Brenden Queen	Pinnacle Racing Group
- Time: 22.770

Most laps led
Driver	Brenden Queen	Pinnacle Racing Group
- Laps: 150

Winner
No. 28	Brenden Queen	Pinnacle Racing Group

Television in the United States
- Network: FS1
- Announcers: Brent Stover and Phil Parsons

Radio in the United States
- Radio: ARCA Racing Network

The 2025 General Tire 150 was the tenth stock car race of the 2025 ARCA Menards Series season, the fifth race of the 2025 ARCA Menards Series East season, and the 2nd iteration of the event. The race was held on Friday, July 18, 2025, at Dover Motor Speedway in Dover, Delaware, a 1 mile (1.6 km) permanent asphalt oval shaped speedway. The race took the scheduled 150 laps to complete. Brenden Queen, driving for Pinnacle Racing Group, would put on a blistering performance, winning the pole and leading every lap of the event to earn his fourth career ARCA Menards Series win, his first career ARCA Menards Series East win in his first start, and his fourth of the season. To fill out the podium, Camden Murphy, driving for Nitro Motorsports in his ARCA debut, and Isabella Robusto, driving for Venturini Motorsports, would finish 2nd and 3rd, respectively.

== Report ==
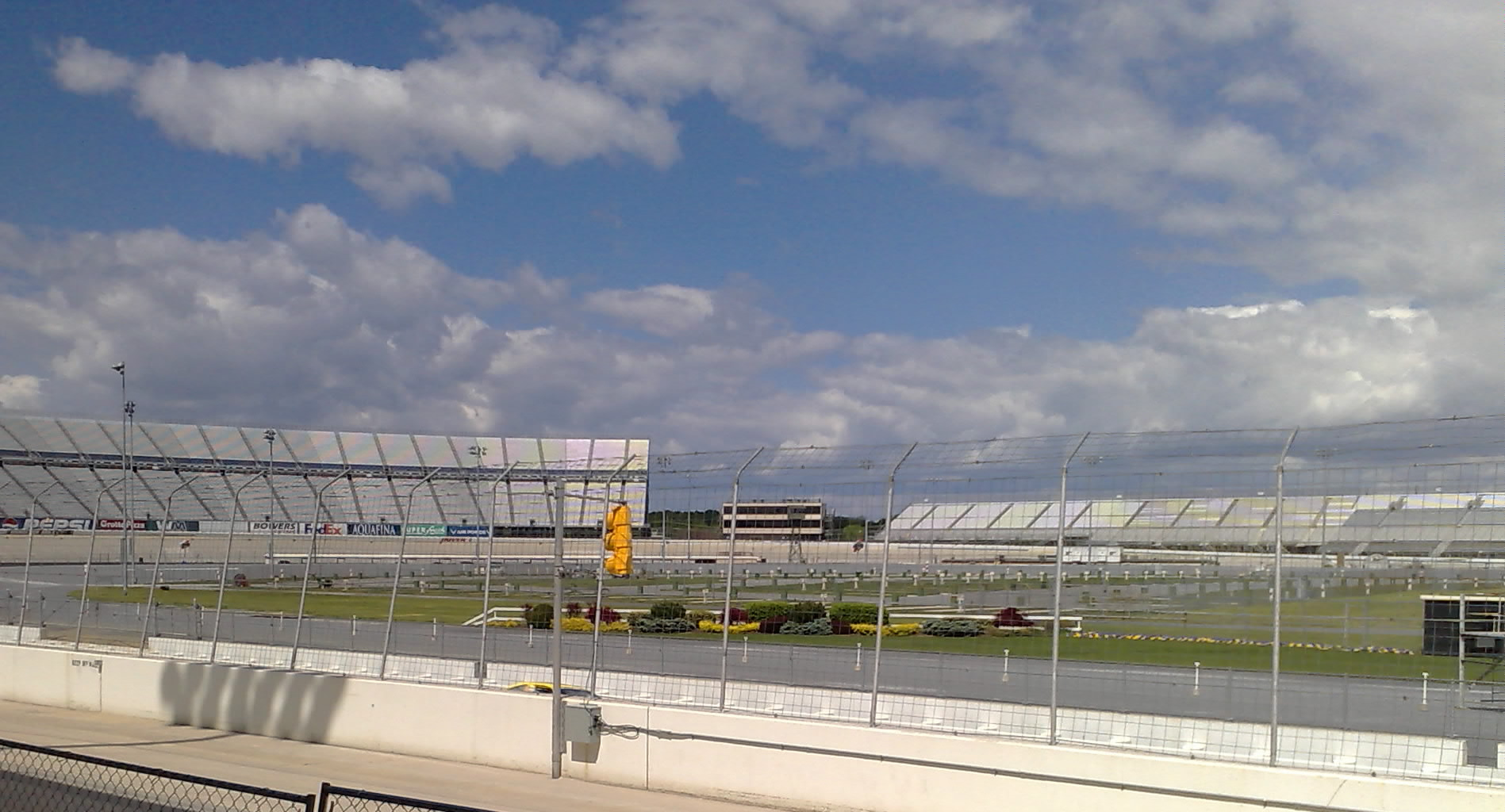
Dover Motor Speedway, the circuit where the race was held.

=== Entry list ===
- (R) denotes rookie driver.

#	Driver	Team	Make	Sponsor
01	Matt Kemp	Fast Track Racing	Toyota	Fast Track Racing
03	Alex Clubb	Clubb Racing Inc.	Ford	Berry Performance & Accessories
06	Brayton Laster (R)	Wayne Peterson Racing	Toyota	PeerlessPump.com
6	Lavar Scott	Rev Racing	Chevrolet	Max Siegel Inc.
9	Blaine Donahue	Fast Track Racing	Toyota	Vatland Automotive Group
10	Tony Cosentino	Fast Track Racing	Ford	HYTORC of New York / Double "H" Ranch
11	Zachary Tinkle	Fast Track Racing	Toyota	Fast Track Racing
12	Takuma Koga (R)	Fast Track Racing	Toyota	Macnica Yit Ikedo / CKB
18	Brent Crews	Joe Gibbs Racing	Toyota	JBL
20	Lawless Alan	Venturini Motorsports	Toyota	AutoParkIt.com
23	Tyler Reif (R)	Sigma Performance Services	Chevrolet	SPS / Vegas Fastener Manufacturing
25	Jake Finch	Venturini Motorsports	Toyota	Phoenix Construction
28	Brenden Queen (R)	Pinnacle Racing Group	Chevrolet	BestRepair.net
34	Austin Vaughn (R)	VWV Racing	Ford	Safford Trading Company
40	Andrew Patterson	Andrew Patterson Racing	Chevrolet	WinSupply / SCS Gearbox
48	Brad Smith	Brad Smith Motorsports	Ford	Gary's Speed Shop
55	Isabella Robusto (R)	Venturini Motorsports	Toyota	Mobil 1
56	Timmy Hill	Hill Motorsports	Toyota	Hill Motorsports
67	Ryan Roulette	Maples Motorsports	Ford	VFW
70	Camden Murphy	Nitro Motorsports	Toyota	Dreamer
79	Isaac Kitzmiller (R)	ACR Motorsports	Chevrolet	A.L.L. Construction / Carter Cat
86	Corey Aiken	Clubb Racing Inc.	Ford	Yavapai Bottle Gas
97	Jason Kitzmiller	CR7 Motorsports	Chevrolet	A.L.L. Construction / Carter Cat
99	Michael Maples	Maples Motorsports	Chevrolet	Don Ray Petroleum / Maples Motorsports
Official entry list

== Practice ==
The first and only practice session was held on Friday, July 18, at 1:40 PM EST, and would last for 45 minutes. Brent Crews, driving for Joe Gibbs Racing, would set the fastest time in the session, with a lap of 22.878, and a speed of 157.356 mph (253.240 km/h).

Pos.	#	Driver	Team	Make	Time	Speed
1	18	Brent Crews	Joe Gibbs Racing	Toyota	22.878	157.356
2	28	Brenden Queen (R)	Pinnacle Racing Group	Chevrolet	22.881	157.336
3	20	Lawless Alan	Venturini Motorsports	Toyota	23.231	154.965
Full practice results

== Qualifying ==
Qualifying was held on Friday, July 18, at 1:40 PM EST. The qualifying procedure used is a multi-car, multi-lap based system. All drivers will be on track for a 20-minute timed session, and whoever sets the fastest time in that session will win the pole.

Brenden Queen, driving for Pinnacle Racing Group, would score the pole for the race, with a lap of 22.770, and a speed of 158.103 mph (254.442 km/h).

=== Qualifying results ===
Pos.	#	Driver	Team	Make	Time	Speed
1	28	Brenden Queen (R)	Pinnacle Racing Group	Chevrolet	22.770	158.103
2	18	Brent Crews	Joe Gibbs Racing	Toyota	22.805	157.860
3	20	Lawless Alan	Venturini Motorsports	Toyota	22.826	157.715
4	25	Jake Finch	Venturini Motorsports	Toyota	23.019	156.393
5	6	Lavar Scott	Rev Racing	Chevrolet	23.194	155.213
6	70	Camden Murphy	Nitro Motorsports	Toyota	23.202	155.159
7	55	Isabella Robusto (R)	Venturini Motorsports	Toyota	23.316	154.400
8	79	Isaac Kitzmiller (R)	ACR Motorsports	Chevrolet	23.531	152.990
9	56	Timmy Hill	Hill Motorsports	Toyota	23.635	152.316
10	40	Andrew Patterson	Andrew Patterson Racing	Chevrolet	23.796	151.286
11	97	Jason Kitzmiller	CR7 Motorsports	Chevrolet	23.938	150.389
12	67	Ryan Roulette	Maples Motorsports	Ford	24.492	146.987
13	11	Zachary Tinkle	Fast Track Racing	Toyota	24.554	146.616
14	9	Blaine Donahue	Fast Track Racing	Toyota	25.022	143.873
15	10	Tony Cosentino	Fast Track Racing	Ford	25.183	142.954
16	99	Michael Maples	Maples Motorsports	Chevrolet	25.345	142.040
17	34	Austin Vaughn (R)	VWV Racing	Ford	25.484	141.265
18	01	Matt Kemp	Fast Track Racing	Toyota	25.747	139.822
19	12	Takuma Koga (R)	Fast Track Racing	Toyota	26.115	137.852
20	06	Brayton Laster (R)	Wayne Peterson Racing	Toyota	26.121	137.820
21	03	Alex Clubb	Clubb Racing Inc.	Ford	28.506	126.289
22	48	Brad Smith	Brad Smith Motorsports	Ford	28.509	126.276
23	86	Corey Aiken	Clubb Racing Inc.	Ford	29.237	123.132
24	23	Tyler Reif (R)	Sigma Performance Services	Chevrolet	–	–
Official qualifying results

== Race results ==
Fin	St	#	Driver	Team	Make	Laps	Led	Status	Pts
1	1	28	Brenden Queen (R)	Pinnacle Racing Group	Chevrolet	150	150	Running	99
2	6	70	Camden Murphy	Nitro Motorsports	Toyota	150	0	Running	42
3	7	55	Isabella Robusto (R)	Venturini Motorsports	Toyota	150	0	Running	91
4	8	79	Isaac Kitzmiller (R)	ACR Motorsports	Chevrolet	150	0	Running	40
5	24	23	Tyler Reif (R)	Sigma Performance Services	Chevrolet	150	0	Running	39
6	9	56	Timmy Hill	Hill Motorsports	Toyota	150	0	Running	38
7	4	25	Jake Finch	Venturini Motorsports	Toyota	150	0	Running	37
8	11	97	Jason Kitzmiller	CR7 Motorsports	Chevrolet	150	0	Running	86
9	13	11	Zachary Tinkle	Fast Track Racing	Toyota	148	0	Running	35
10	10	40	Andrew Patterson	Andrew Patterson Racing	Chevrolet	146	0	Running	34
11	5	6	Lavar Scott	Rev Racing	Chevrolet	143	0	Running	83
12	3	20	Lawless Alan	Venturini Motorsports	Toyota	140	0	Running	82
13	16	99	Michael Maples	Maples Motorsports	Chevrolet	140	0	Running	81
14	17	34	Austin Vaughn (R)	VWV Racing	Ford	140	0	Running	30
15	19	12	Takuma Koga (R)	Fast Track Racing	Toyota	137	0	Running	29
16	20	06	Brayton Laster (R)	Wayne Peterson Racing	Toyota	136	0	Running	78
17	12	67	Ryan Roulette	Maples Motorsports	Ford	125	0	Mechanical	27
18	21	03	Alex Clubb	Clubb Racing Inc.	Ford	102	0	Mechanical	76
19	23	86	Corey Aiken	Clubb Racing Inc.	Ford	79	0	Accident	25
20	22	48	Brad Smith	Brad Smith Motorsports	Ford	55	0	Handling	74
21	2	18	Brent Crews	Joe Gibbs Racing	Toyota	44	0	Accident	23
22	15	10	Tony Cosentino	Fast Track Racing	Ford	11	0	Mechanical	22
23	14	9	Blaine Donahue	Fast Track Racing	Toyota	8	0	Mechanical	21
24	18	01	Matt Kemp	Fast Track Racing	Toyota	5	0	Mechanical	20
Official race results

== Standings after the race ==
Drivers' Championship standings (ARCA Main)

	Pos	Driver	Points
	1	Brenden Queen	511
	2	Lawless Alan	485 (–26)
	3	Lavar Scott	478 (–33)
	4	Jason Kitzmiller	418 (–93)
	5	Isabella Robusto	397 (–114)
	6	Alex Clubb	367 (–144)
	7	Michael Maples	360 (–151)
	8	Brayton Laster	345 (–166)
	9	Andy Jankowiak	262 (–249)
1	10	Brad Smith	239 (–272)

Drivers' Championship standings (ARCA East)

	Pos	Driver	Points
	1	Isaac Kitzmiller	244
	2	Tyler Reif	237 (–7)
1	3	Zachary Tinkle	229 (–15)
1	4	Takuma Koga	219 (–25)
1	5	Austin Vaughn	209 (–35)
2	6	Brad Smith	186 (–58)
4	7	Max Reaves	146 (–98)
1	8	Nate Moeller	116 (–128)
6	9	Timmy Hill	99 (–145)
1	10	Rita Goulet	85 (–159)

- Note: Only the first 10 positions are included for the driver standings.

Previous race: 2025 Lime Rock Park 100	ARCA Menards Series; 2025 season	Next race: 2025 LiUNA! 150 (ARCA)

Previous race: 2025 Dutch Boy 150	ARCA Menards Series East; 2025 season	Next race: 2025 LiUNA! 150 (ARCA)
