= Brayton Laster =

American racing driver (born 2002)

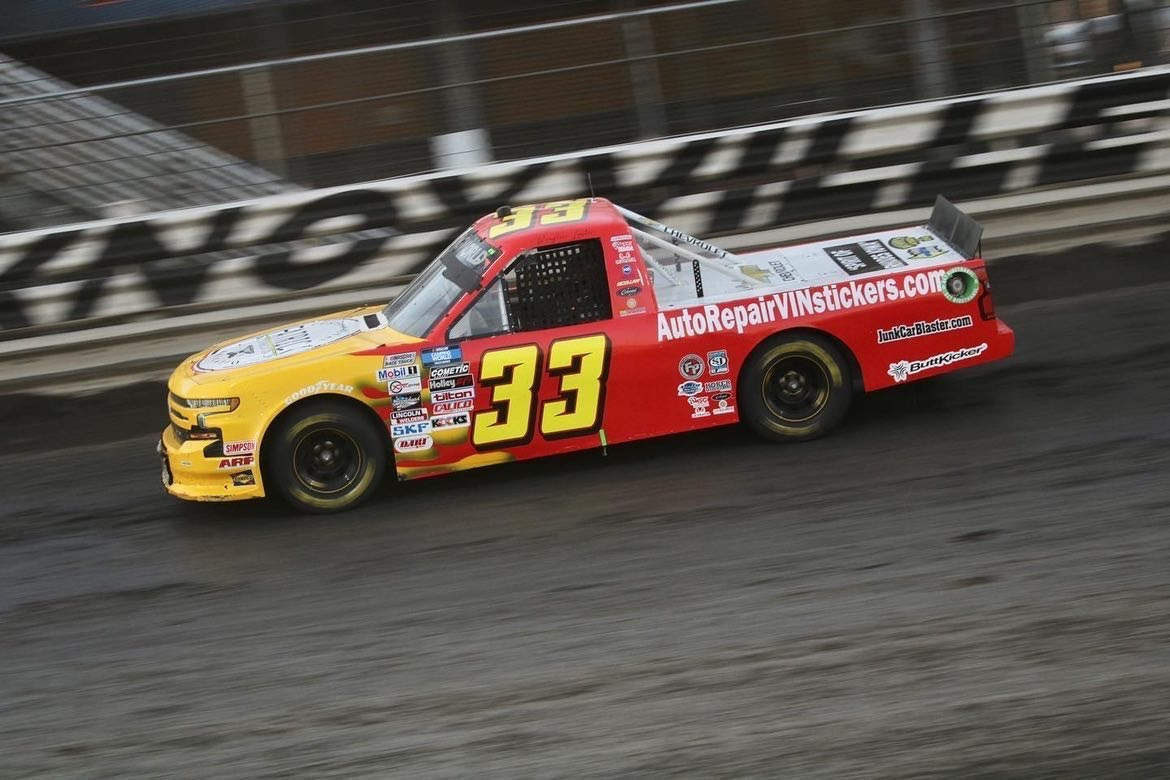
- Laster's No. 33 truck at Knoxville Raceway in 2022
- Born: August 28, 2002 (age 24); Greenwood, Indiana, U.S.
- Achievements: 2018 Brownstown Speedway Super Late Model Rookie of the Year

NASCAR FedEx Freight Truck Series career
- 1 race run over 1 year
- 2022 position: 64th
- Best finish: 64th (2022)
- First race: 2022 Clean Harbors 150 (Knoxville)
Wins	Top tens	Poles
0	0	0

ARCA Menards Series career
- 43 races run over 5 years
- Best finish: 8th (2025)
- First race: 2022 Lucas Oil 200 (Daytona)
- Last race: 2026 Menards 150 (Kansas)
Wins	Top tens	Poles
0	5	0

ARCA Menards Series East career
- 11 races run over 4 years
- Best finish: 17th (2025)
- First race: 2023 Music City 200 (Nashville Fairgrounds)
- Last race: 2026 JR & CO. 150 (Iowa)
Wins	Top tens	Poles
0	0	0

ARCA Menards Series West career
- 2 races run over 2 years
- Best finish: 72nd (2025)
- First race: 2024 General Tire 150 (Phoenix)
- Last race: 2025 General Tire 150 (Phoenix)
Wins	Top tens	Poles
0	0	0
- Statistics up to date as of September 25, 2026.

Brayton Laster (born August 28, 2002), nicknamed "the Pizza Man", is an American professional stock car racing driver. He last competed part-time in the ARCA Menards Series, driving for multiple teams including Wayne Peterson Racing, Rise Racing, and Clubb Racing Inc.

== Racing career ==
=== Early racing career ===
Laster would start racing go-karts at the age of eight at the Indianapolis Speedrome. Four years later, he would move on to racing Ford Thunderbirds and other various types of stock cars. According to Laster's dad, Dane, he would describe Brayton's equipment as a Frankenstein-esque vehicle, saying that "There’s times where I look back and I feel bad about some of the stuff I put him in over the years. But he’s had to drive his heart out, he’s had to learn to work on it to get speed out of it."

For most of his career, Laster has driven the No. 13 along with green paint, both racing superstitions that are rumored to give bad luck. Laster said that he wanted both qualities as a satire to both superstitions.

=== ARCA Menards Series ===
Laster made his ARCA Menards Series debut in 2022 in the Lucas Oil 200 at the Daytona International Speedway, driving the No. 03 car for Mullins Racing. Laster had a strong run, finishing 13th. He returned to the 03 car for the 2023 Daytona season-opener, finishing 27th. Laster would join Fast Track Racing for the race at Charlotte, finishing 19th. Later in the year, he drove the No. 31 car for Rise Motorsports in three races, finishing top ten in all three.

On January 2, 2024, it was announced that Laster would join TC Motorsports for the season-opener at Daytona, driving the No. 91 car. It was later revealed that Laster would drive the No. 95 at Daytona, driving for MAN Motorsports in a partnership with TC Motorsports. He would ultimately fail to qualify for the race. Laster went on to make seven starts throughout the season following this, driving for Fast Track Racing, Rise Motorsports, and Wayne Peterson Racing, finishing a best of ninth at Salem Speedway.

On October 30, 2024, it was announced that Laster would run full-time in the ARCA Menards Series in 2025, driving for Wayne Peterson Racing. On the season, Laster earned one top-ten finish and finished eighth in the point standings.

On March 4, 2026, it was announced that Laster will run a part-time stint in the ARCA Menards Series for 2026, driving for both Wayne Peterson Racing and Clubb Racing Inc.

=== ARCA Menards Series East ===
In 2023, Laster made his ARCA Menards Series East debut in the Music City 200 at the Nashville Fairgrounds Speedway driving for Fast Track Racing. A fuel pressure issue would sideline him and he would ultimately finish 14th. Later in the year, he would also makes starts in the ARCA/ARCA East combination races at Iowa Speedway and Indianapolis Raceway Park. In 2024, Laster's only East start came at the Indianapolis Raceway park combination race, where he finished 19th driving for Wayne Peterson Racing.

=== ARCA Menards Series West ===
In 2024, Laster made his ARCA Menards Series West debut in the General Tire 150 ARCA/ARCA West combination race, driving for Fast Track Racing. He started 35th and finished 37th after retiring from the event after seventeen laps.

=== Craftsman Truck Series ===
On April 28, 2022, it was announced that Laster would make his NASCAR Camping World Truck Series debut in the Clean Harbors 150 at Knoxville with Reaume Brothers Racing. He would start the race 31st and finish 27th.

=== Other racing ===
On November 18, 2025, it was revealed that Laster would attempt to race in the 2026 Chili Bowl Nationals with Zach Boden Racing.

== Personal life ==
Laster is nicknamed "The Pizza Man" for his love of pizza. According to Laster, he was self-proclaimed obsessed with pizza, which started with the Indianapolis Speedrome selling pizza for concessions. It then "became my identity", and he was reported wearing numerous clothes that looked like pizza throughout middle school, earning the nickname from teachers. The nickname eventually moved over to his racing career.

Laster was an online student at Liberty University, studying business.

== Motorsports career results ==
=== Stock car career summary ===
Season	Series	Team	Races	Wins	Top 5	Top 10	Points	Position
2022	ARCA Menards Series	Mullins Racing	2	0	0	0	49	67th
2022	NASCAR Camping World Truck Series	Reaume Brothers Racing	1	0	0	0	10	64th
2023	ARCA Menards Series East	Fast Track Racing	3	0	0	0	78	22nd
2023	ARCA Menards Series	Fast Track Racing	3	0	0	0	193	25th
2023	ARCA Menards Series	Clubb Racing Inc.	1	0	0	0	193	25th
2023	ARCA Menards Series	Rise Motorsports	3	0	0	3	193	25th
2024	ARCA Menards Series West	Fast Track Racing	1	0	0	0	7	79th
2024	ARCA Menards Series	Fast Track Racing	2	0	0	0	170	26th
2024	ARCA Menards Series	MAN Motorsports	0	0	0	0	170	26th
2024	ARCA Menards Series	Rise Motorsports	3	0	0	0	170	26th
2024	ARCA Menards Series	Wayne Peterson Racing	2	0	0	1	170	26th
2024	ARCA Menards Series East	Wayne Peterson Racing	1	0	0	0	25	55th
2025	ARCA Menards Series West	Wayne Peterson Racing	1	0	0	0	22	72nd
2025	ARCA Menards Series East	Wayne Peterson Racing	4	0	0	0	135	17th
2025	ARCA Menards Series	Wayne Peterson Racing	20	0	0	1	700	8th
2026	ARCA Menards Series East	Wayne Peterson Racing	1	0	0	0	53	43rd
2026	ARCA Menards Series East	Rise Racing	1	0	0	0	53	43rd
2026	ARCA Menards Series East	Clubb Racing Inc.	1	0	0	0	53	43rd
2026	ARCA Menards Series	Clubb Racing Inc.	3	0	0	0	140	33rd
2026	ARCA Menards Series	Wayne Peterson Racing	3	0	0	0	140	33rd
2026	ARCA Menards Series	Rise Racing	1	0	0	0	140	33rd

=== NASCAR ===
==== Camping World Truck Series ====
(key) (Bold – Pole position awarded by qualifying time. Italics – Pole position earned by points standings or practice time. * – Most laps led.)

NASCAR Camping World Truck Series results
Year	Team	No.	Make	1	2	3	4	5	6	7	8	9	10	11	12	13	14	15	16	17	18	19	20	21	22	23	NCWTC	Pts	Ref
2022	Reaume Brothers Racing	33	Chevy	DAY	LVS	ATL	COA	MAR	BRI	DAR	KAN	TEX	CLT	GTW	SON	KNX; 27	NSH	MOH	POC	IRP	RCH	KAN	BRI	TAL	HOM	PHO	64th	10	

=== ARCA Menards Series ===
(key) (Bold – Pole position awarded by qualifying time. Italics – Pole position earned by points standings or practice time. * – Most laps led.)

ARCA Menards Series results
Year	Team	No.	Make	1	2	3	4	5	6	7	8	9	10	11	12	13	14	15	16	17	18	19	20	AMSC	Pts	Ref
2022	Mullins Racing	03	Ford	DAY; 13	PHO	TAL; 26	KAN	CLT	IOW	BLN	ELK	MOH	POC	IRP	MCH	GLN	ISF	MLW	DSF	KAN	BRI	SLM	TOL	67th	49	
2023	Clubb Racing Inc.	03	Ford	DAY; 27	PHO	TAL	KAN																	25th	193	
2023	Fast Track Racing	12	Ford					CLT; 19	BLN	ELK	MOH													25th	193	
2023	Fast Track Racing	01	Chevy									IOW; 20	POC	MCH	IRP; 20	GLN								25th	193	
2023	Rise Motorsports	31	Chevy														ISF; 10	MLW	DSF; 10	KAN	BRI	SLM; 9	TOL	25th	193	
2024	MAN Motorsports	95	Toyota	DAY; DNQ																				26th	170	
2024	Fast Track Racing	10	Ford		PHO; 37	TAL	DOV																	26th	170	
2024	Rise Motorsports	31	Chevy					KAN; 22	CLT	IOW	MOH	BLN					ISF; 14	MLW	DSF; 13					26th	170	
2024	Wayne Peterson Racing	06	Toyota										IRP; 19	SLM; 9	ELK	MCH								26th	170	
2024	Fast Track Racing	12	Ford																	GLN; 27	BRI	KAN	TOL	26th	170	
2025	Wayne Peterson Racing	0	Chevy	DAY; 24																				8th	700	
2025	Wayne Peterson Racing	06	Toyota		PHO; 22			CLT; 20					DOV; 16	IRP; 25						BRI; 29	SLM; 16		TOL; 16	8th	700	
2025	Wayne Peterson Racing	06	Chevy			TAL; 34						LRP; 15				GLN; 23								8th	700	
2025	Wayne Peterson Racing	06	Ford				KAN; 15		MCH; 19	BLN; 17	ELK; 13				IOW; 21		ISF; 7	MAD; 14	DSF; 13			KAN; 21		8th	700	
2026	Wayne Peterson Racing	06	Chevy	DAY	PHO	KAN; 23	TAL	GLN	TOL	MCH	POC; 17	BER	ELK	CHI; 20	LRP									33rd	140	
2026	Rise Racing	89	Chevy													IRP; 27								33rd	140	
2026	Clubb Racing Inc.	83	Ford														IOW; 31	ISF; 24	MAD	DSF; Wth	SLM; Wth	BRI	KAN; 26	33rd	140	

==== ARCA Menards Series East ====
ARCA Menards Series East results
Year	Team	No.	Make	1	2	3	4	5	6	7	8	AMSEC	Pts	Ref
2023	Fast Track Racing	01	Toyota	FIF	DOV	NSV; 14	FRS					22nd	78	
2023	Fast Track Racing	01	Chevy					IOW; 20	IRP; 20	MLW	BRI	22nd	78	
2024	Wayne Peterson Racing	06	Toyota	FIF	DOV	NSV	FRS	IOW	IRP; 19	MLW	BRI	55th	25	
2025	Wayne Peterson Racing	06	Toyota	FIF	CAR	NSV	FRS	DOV; 16	IRP; 25		BRI; 29	17th	135	
2025	Wayne Peterson Racing	06	Ford							IOW; 21		17th	135	
2026	Wayne Peterson Racing	0	Toyota	HCY	CAR	NSV; 21	TOL					43rd	53	
2026	Rise Racing	89	Chevy					IRP; 27	FRS			43rd	53	
2026	Clubb Racing Inc.	83	Ford							IOW; 31	BRI	43rd	53	

==== ARCA Menards Series West ====
ARCA Menards Series West results
Year	Team	No.	Make	1	2	3	4	5	6	7	8	9	10	11	12	AMSWC	Pts	Ref
2024	Fast Track Racing	10	Ford	PHO; 37	KER	PIR	SON	IRW	IRW	SHA	TRI	MAD	AAS	KER	PHO	79th	7	
2025	Wayne Peterson Racing	06	Toyota	KER	PHO; 22	TUC	CNS	KER	SON	TRI	PIR	AAS	MAD	LVS	PHO	72nd	22	
