= Blaine Donahue =

American racing driver

- Born: September 1, 2005 (age 21); Cornelius, North Carolina, U.S.

ARCA Menards Series career
- 1 race run over 1 year
- Best finish: 126th (2025)
- First race: 2025 General Tire 150 (Dover)
Wins	Top tens	Poles
0	0	0

ARCA Menards Series East career
- 4 races run over 3 years
- Best finish: 43rd (2025)
- First race: 2024 Dutch Boy 150 (Flat Rock)
- Last race: 2026 Sunbelt Rentals 150 (Flat Rock)
Wins	Top tens	Poles
0	2	0
- Statistics up to date as of August 1, 2025.

Blaine Donahue (born September 1, 2005) is an American professional stock car racing driver. He last competed part-time in the ARCA Menards Series East, driving the No. 11 Ford for Fast Track Racing.

== Racing career ==
=== ARCA Menards Series ===
In 2024, Donahue participated in the pre-season test for the ARCA Menards Series at Daytona International Speedway, driving the No. 10 Chevrolet for Fast Track Racing, and placed 49th in the overall results between the two testing days.

In 2025, he competed in the ARCA / ARCA East combination race at Dover, for Fast Track, where he finished 23rd after a mechanical issue.

=== ARCA Menards Series East ===
In 2024, it was revealed that Donahue would make his debut in the ARCA Menards Series East at Flat Rock Speedway, driving the No. 01 Toyota for Fast Track Racing, where after placing eleventh in the lone practice session, he qualified and finished four laps in seventh place.

On April 11, 2025, it was announced that Donahue would drive the No. 9 for Fast Track at Rockingham Speedway for his second East Series start. He competed in the ARCA / ARCA East combination race at Dover, where he finished 23rd after a mechanical issue.

In 2026, he competed at Flat Rock, where he scored a tenth-place finish.

== Personal life ==
Donahue is the son of Patrick Donahue, who currently serves as a partial crew chief for Patrick Staropoli and the No. 48 Chevrolet for Big Machine Racing, and who previously served as a pit-crew member for Hendrick Motorsports and Jeff Gordon, winning three titles in 1995, 1997, and 1998. The younger Donahue also currently works as a crew member for BMR.

== Motorsports career results ==
=== ARCA Menards Series ===
(key) (Bold – Pole position awarded by qualifying time. Italics – Pole position earned by points standings or practice time. * – Most laps led. ** – All laps led.)

ARCA Menards Series results
Year	Team	No.	Make	1	2	3	4	5	6	7	8	9	10	11	12	13	14	15	16	17	18	19	20	AMSC	Pts	Ref
2025	Fast Track Racing	9	Toyota	DAY	PHO	TAL	KAN	CLT	MCH	BLN	ELK	LRP	DOV; 23	IRP	IOW	GLN	ISF	MAD	DSF	BRI	SLM	KAN	TOL	126th	21	

==== ARCA Menards Series East ====
ARCA Menards Series East results
Year	Team	No.	Make	1	2	3	4	5	6	7	8	AMSEC	Pts	Ref
2024	Fast Track Racing	01	Toyota	FIF	DOV	NSV	FRS; 7	IOW	IRP	MLW	BRI	45th	37	
2025	Fast Track Racing	9	Toyota	FIF	CAR; 16	NSV	FRS	DOV; 23	IRP	IOW	BRI	43rd	49	
2026	Fast Track Racing	11	Ford	HCY	CAR	NSV	TOL	IRP	FRS; 10	IOW	BRI	53rd	34	
