= Toby Blanton =

American racing driver (born 1967)

- Born: February 28, 1967 (age 59); Venice, Florida

ARCA Menards Series East career
- 4 races run over 1 year
- Best finish: 21st (2026)
- First race: 2026 Cook Out 200 (Hickory)
- Last race: 2026 Sunbelt Rentals 150 (Flat Rock)
Wins	Top tens	Poles
0	0	0

ARCA Menards Series West career
- 1 race run over 1 year
- Best finish: 76th (2026)
- First race: 2026 Oil Workers 150 presented by the West Coast Stock Car Motorsports Hall of Fame (Bakersfield)
Wins	Top tens	Poles
0	0	0
- Statistics up to date as of November 2, 2026.

Toby Blanton (born February 28, 1967) is an American professional stock car racing driver. He last competed part-time in both the ARCA Menards Series East and ARCA Menards Series West, driving the No. 00 Chevrolet for his family-owned team Jet Daddy Racing.

== Racing career ==
Blanton has previously competed in the Super Cup Stock Car Series, having made three starts in the series in 2025.

In 2026, it was revealed that Blanton would participate in the pre-season test for the ARCA Menards Series at Daytona International Speedway, driving the No. 22 Chevrolet for Drew White Motorsports, where he set the 80th quickest time between the two sessions held.

That same year, Blanton made his debut in the ARCA Menards Series West at Kevin Harvick's Kern Raceway, driving the No. 00 Chevrolet for Jet Daddy Racing, where he finished 21st due to steering issues. He then made his debut in the ARCA Menards Series East at Hickory Motor Speedway, driving for the same team, with plans to run the full schedule in that series.

== Motorsports results ==
=== Stock car career summary ===
Season	Series	Team	Races	Wins	Top 5	Top 10	Points	Position
2026	ARCA Menards Series West	Jet Daddy Racing	1	0	0	0	23	76th
2026	ARCA Menards Series East	Jet Daddy Racing	4	0	0	0	107	21st

=== ARCA Menards Series East ===
(key) (Bold – Pole position awarded by qualifying time. Italics – Pole position earned by points standings or practice time. * – Most laps led.)

ARCA Menards Series East results
Year	Team	No.	Make	1	2	3	4	5	6	7	8	AMSEC	Pts	Ref
2026	Jet Daddy Racing	00	Chevy	HCY; 19	CAR; 18	NSV; 15	TOL	IRP	FRS; 17	IOW	BRI	21st	107	

==== ARCA Menards Series West ====
(key) (Bold – Pole position awarded by qualifying time. Italics – Pole position earned by points standings or practice time. * – Most laps led. ** – All laps led.)

ARCA Menards Series West results
Year	Team	No.	Make	1	2	3	4	5	6	7	8	9	10	11	12	13	AMSWC	Pts	Ref
2026	Jet Daddy Racing	00	Chevy	KER; 21	PHO	TUC	SHA	CNS	TRI	SON	PIR	AAS	MAD	LVS	PHO	KER	76th	23	
