= 2025 Tide 150 =

4th race of the 2025 ARCA Menards Series

Race details
- Race 4 of 20 of the 2025 ARCA Menards Series
- Date: May 9, 2025
- Location: Kansas Speedway in Kansas City, Kansas
- Course: Permanent racing facility
- Course length: 1.5 miles (2.4 km)
- Distance: 105 laps, 157 mi (253 km)
- Scheduled distance: 100 laps, 150 mi (241 km)
- Average speed: 117.221 mph (188.649 km/h)

Pole position
Driver	Lawless Alan	Venturini Motorsports
- Time: 30.927

Most laps led
Driver	Brenden Queen	Pinnacle Racing Group
- Laps: 72

Winner
No. 28	Brenden Queen	Pinnacle Racing Group

Television in the United States
- Network: FS1
- Announcers: Brent Stover, Phil Parsons, and Carson Hocevar

Radio in the United States
- Radio: MRN

The 2025 Tide 150 was the 4th stock car race of the 2025 ARCA Menards Series season, and the 6th running of the event. The race was held on Friday, May 9, 2025, at Kansas Speedway in Kansas City, Kansas, a 1.5 mile (2.4 km) quad-oval shaped intermediate speedway. The race was originally scheduled to be contested over 100 laps, but was increased to 105 due to an overtime finish. Brenden Queen, driving for Pinnacle Racing Group, would take the lead in the early stages of the race, and became unstoppable throughout the rest of the event, leading a race-high 72 laps to earn his second career ARCA Menards Series win, and his second of the season. To fill out the podium, William Sawalich, driving for Joe Gibbs Racing, and Mason Mitchell, driving for Venturini Motorsports, would finish 2nd and 3rd, respectively.

== Report ==
=== Background ===
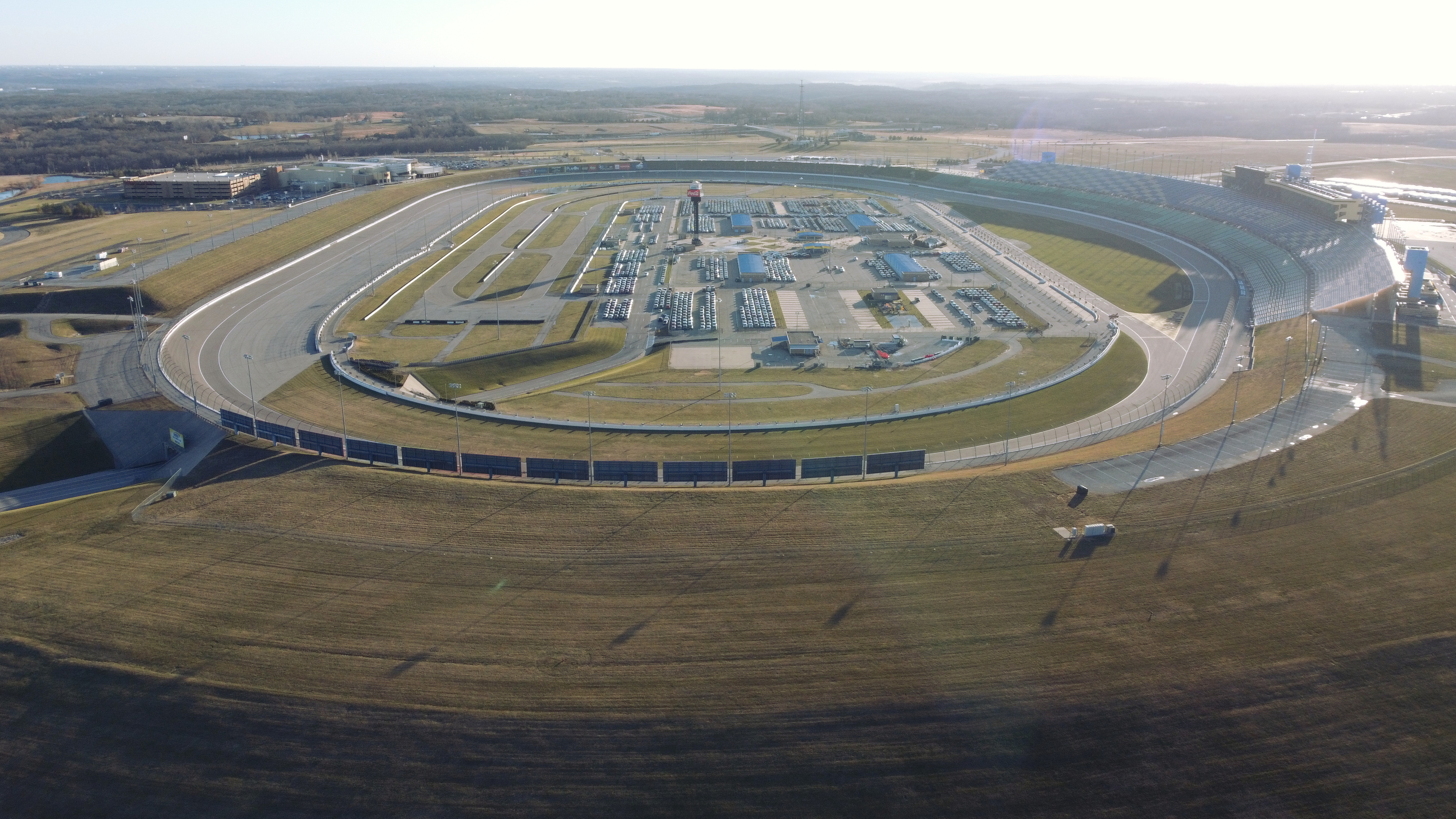
The layout of Kansas Speedway, the circuit where the race will be held.

Kansas Speedway is a 1.5-mile (2.4 km) tri-oval race track in Kansas City, Kansas. It was built in 2001 and hosts two annual NASCAR race weekends. The NTT IndyCar Series also raced there until 2011. The speedway is owned and operated by the International Speedway Corporation.

==== Entry list ====
- (R) denotes rookie driver.

#	Driver	Team	Make
0	Kevin Hinckle	Wayne Peterson Racing	Chevrolet
2	Lanie Buice	Rev Racing	Chevrolet
03	Alex Clubb	Clubb Racing Inc.	Ford
06	Brayton Laster (R)	Wayne Peterson Racing	Ford
6	Lavar Scott	Rev Racing	Chevrolet
9	Presley Sorah	Fast Track Racing	Toyota
10	Nate Moeller	Fast Track Racing	Toyota
11	Mike Basham	Fast Track Racing	Ford
12	Matt Kemp	Fast Track Racing	Ford
17	Patrick Staropoli	Cook Racing Technologies	Toyota
18	William Sawalich	Joe Gibbs Racing	Toyota
20	Lawless Alan	Venturini Motorsports	Toyota
23	Spencer Gallagher	Sigma Performance Services	Chevrolet
25	Mason Mitchell	Venturini Motorsports	Toyota
28	Brenden Queen (R)	Pinnacle Racing Group	Chevrolet
31	Tim Goulet	Rise Motorsports	Toyota
46	Thad Moffitt	Nitro Motorsports	Toyota
48	Brad Smith	Brad Smith Motorsports	Ford
55	Isabella Robusto (R)	Venturini Motorsports	Toyota
67	Ryan Vargas	Maples Motorsports	Ford
68	Will Kimmel	Kimmel Racing	Ford
69	Miguel Gomes	Kimmel Racing	Ford
73	Andy Jankowiak	KLAS Motorsports	Toyota
86	Brian Clubb	Clubb Racing Inc.	Ford
97	Jason Kitzmiller	CR7 Motorsports	Chevrolet
99	Michael Maples	Maples Motorsports	Chevrolet
Official entry list

== Optional Practice ==
An optional pre-race practice session was held on Friday, May 9, at 8:30 AM CST, and would last for 5 hours. Brenden Queen, driving for Pinnacle Racing Group, would set the fastest time in the session, with a lap of 31.023, and a speed of 174.064 mph (280.129 km/h).

Pos.	#	Driver	Team	Make	Time	Speed
1	28	Brenden Queen (R)	Pinnacle Racing Group	Chevrolet	31.023	174.064
2	20	Lawless Alan	Venturini Motorsports	Toyota	31.167	173.260
3	18	William Sawalich	Joe Gibbs Racing	Toyota	31.211	173.016
Full pre-race practice results

== Practice ==
The official final practice session was held on Friday, May 9, at 4:00 PM CST, and would last for 45 minutes. William Sawalich, driving for Joe Gibbs Racing, would set the fastest time in the session, with a lap of 31.055, and a speed of 173.885 mph (279.841 km/h).

Pos.	#	Driver	Team	Make	Time	Speed
1	18	William Sawalich	Joe Gibbs Racing	Toyota	31.055	173.885
2	28	Brenden Queen (R)	Pinnacle Racing Group	Chevrolet	31.220	172.966
3	17	Patrick Staropoli	Cook Racing Technologies	Toyota	31.347	172.265
Full practice results

== Qualifying ==
Qualifying was held on Friday, May 9, at 5:00 PM CST. The qualifying system used is a multi-car, multi-lap based system. All drivers will be on track for a 20-minute timed session, and whoever sets the fastest time in that session will win the pole.

Lawless Alan, driving for Venturini Motorsports, would score the pole for the race, with a lap of 30.927, and a speed of 174.605 mph (281.000 km/h).

=== Qualifying results ===
Pos.	#	Driver	Team	Make	Time	Speed
1	20	Lawless Alan	Venturini Motorsports	Toyota	30.927	174.605
2	46	Thad Moffitt	Nitro Motorsports	Toyota	30.990	174.250
3	18	William Sawalich	Joe Gibbs Racing	Toyota	30.996	174.216
4	25	Mason Mitchell	Venturini Motorsports	Toyota	31.016	174.104
5	28	Brenden Queen (R)	Pinnacle Racing Group	Chevrolet	31.132	173.455
6	55	Isabella Robusto (R)	Venturini Motorsports	Toyota	31.247	172.817
7	6	Lavar Scott	Rev Racing	Chevrolet	31.250	172.800
8	73	Andy Jankowiak	KLAS Motorsports	Toyota	31.294	172.557
9	17	Patrick Staropoli	Cook Racing Technologies	Toyota	31.359	172.199
10	68	Will Kimmel	Kimmel Racing	Ford	31.512	171.363
11	97	Jason Kitzmiller	CR7 Motorsports	Chevrolet	31.632	170.713
12	2	Lanie Buice	Rev Racing	Chevrolet	31.667	170.525
13	67	Ryan Vargas	Maples Motorsports	Ford	31.702	170.336
14	23	Spencer Gallagher	Sigma Performance Services	Chevrolet	32.185	167.780
15	69	Miguel Gomes	Kimmel Racing	Ford	33.557	160.920
16	99	Michael Maples	Maples Motorsports	Chevrolet	33.881	159.381
17	06	Brayton Laster (R)	Wayne Peterson Racing	Ford	34.565	156.227
18	12	Matt Kemp	Fast Track Racing	Ford	34.643	155.876
19	31	Tim Goulet	Rise Motorsports	Toyota	35.784	150.905
20	9	Presley Sorah	Fast Track Racing	Toyota	36.503	147.933
21	0	Kevin Hinckle	Wayne Peterson Racing	Chevrolet	36.863	146.488
22	11	Mike Basham	Fast Track Racing	Ford	38.036	141.971
23	03	Alex Clubb	Clubb Racing Inc.	Ford	39.850	135.508
24	48	Brad Smith	Brad Smith Motorsports	Ford	41.325	130.672
25	10	Nate Moeller	Fast Track Racing	Toyota	41.331	130.653
26	86	Brian Clubb	Clubb Racing Inc.	Ford	–	–
Official qualifying results

== Race results ==
Fin	St	#	Driver	Team	Make	Laps	Led	Status	Pts
1	5	28	Brenden Queen (R)	Pinnacle Racing Group	Chevrolet	105	72	Running	48
2	3	18	William Sawalich	Joe Gibbs Racing	Toyota	105	29	Running	43
3	4	25	Mason Mitchell	Venturini Motorsports	Toyota	105	0	Running	41
4	1	20	Lawless Alan	Venturini Motorsports	Toyota	105	4	Running	42
5	7	6	Lavar Scott	Rev Racing	Chevrolet	105	0	Running	39
6	8	73	Andy Jankowiak	KLAS Motorsports	Toyota	105	0	Running	38
7	11	97	Jason Kitzmiller	CR7 Motorsports	Chevrolet	105	0	Running	37
8	12	2	Lanie Buice	Rev Racing	Chevrolet	105	0	Running	36
9	14	23	Spencer Gallagher	Sigma Performance Services	Chevrolet	105	0	Running	35
10	13	67	Ryan Vargas	Maples Motorsports	Ford	104	0	Running	34
11	15	69	Miguel Gomes	Kimmel Racing	Ford	102	0	Running	33
12	16	99	Michael Maples	Maples Motorsports	Chevrolet	100	0	Running	32
13	6	55	Isabella Robusto (R)	Venturini Motorsports	Toyota	99	0	Accident	31
14	19	31	Tim Goulet	Rise Motorsports	Toyota	93	0	Running	30
15	17	06	Brayton Laster (R)	Wayne Peterson Racing	Ford	92	0	Running	29
16	2	46	Thad Moffitt	Nitro Motorsports	Toyota	91	0	Accident	28
17	21	0	Kevin Hinckle	Wayne Peterson Racing	Chevrolet	86	0	Running	27
18	23	03	Alex Clubb	Clubb Racing Inc.	Ford	33	0	Handling	26
19	22	11	Mike Basham	Fast Track Racing	Ford	21	0	DNF	25
20	18	12	Matt Kemp	Fast Track Racing	Ford	10	0	DNF	24
21	20	9	Presley Sorah	Fast Track Racing	Toyota	8	0	DNF	23
22	9	17	Patrick Staropoli	Cook Racing Technologies	Toyota	5	0	Oil Line	22
23	24	48	Brad Smith	Brad Smith Motorsports	Ford	4	0	Handling	21
24	25	10	Nate Moeller	Fast Track Racing	Toyota	3	0	Handling	20
25	10	68	Will Kimmel	Kimmel Racing	Ford	2	0	Quit	19
26	26	86	Brian Clubb	Clubb Racing Inc.	Ford	0	0	DNS	18
Official race results

== Standings after the race ==
Drivers' Championship standings

	Pos	Driver	Points
2	1	Brenden Queen	158
	2	Lawless Alan	157 (-1)
2	3	Lavar Scott	157 (–1)
	4	Andy Jankowiak	145 (–13)
	5	Jason Kitzmiller	135 (–23)
1	6	William Sawalich	123 (–35)
1	7	Thad Moffitt	102 (–56)
2	8	Kole Raz	98 (–60)
2	9	Alex Clubb	94 (–64)
	10	Patrick Staropoli	91 (–67)

- Note: Only the first 10 positions are included for the driver standings.

Previous race: 2025 General Tire 200 (Talladega)	ARCA Menards Series; 2025 season	Next race: 2025 General Tire 150 (Charlotte)
