= Michael Maples (racing driver) =

American racing driver (born 1963)

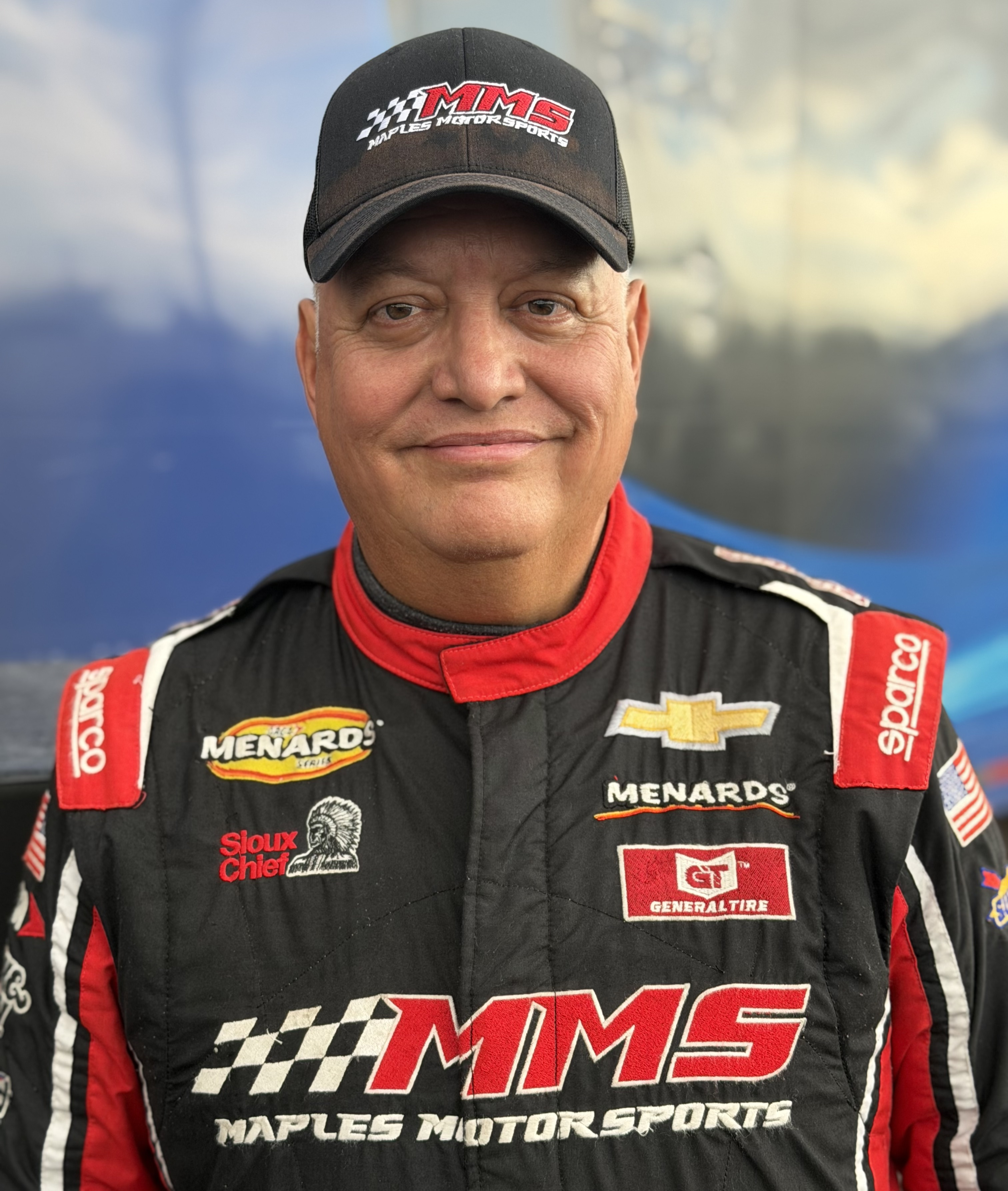
- Maples in 2025
- Born: Michael James Maples; December 5, 1963 (age 62); Choctaw, Oklahoma, U.S.

ARCA Menards Series career
- 60 races run over 3 years
- ARCA no., team: No. 91/99 (Maples Motorsports)
- Best finish: 6th (2026)
- First race: 2024 Hard Rock Bet 200 (Daytona)
- Last race: 2026 Menards 150 (Kansas)
Wins	Top tens	Poles
0	1	0

ARCA Menards Series East career
- 20 races run over 3 years
- ARCA East no., team: No. 91/99 (Maples Motorsports)
- Best finish: 7th (2024)
- First race: 2024 Pensacola 150 (Pensacola)
- Last race: 2026 Bush's Best 200 (Bristol)
Wins	Top tens	Poles
0	0	0

ARCA Menards Series West career
- 5 races run over 3 years
- ARCA West no., team: No. 99 (Maples Motorsports)
- Best finish: 18th (2025)
- First race: 2024 General Tire 150 (Phoenix)
- Last race: 2026 General Tire 150 (Phoenix)
Wins	Top tens	Poles
0	0	0
- Statistics up to date as of September 26, 2026.

Michael James Maples Sr. (born December 5, 1963) is an American professional stock car racing driver and team owner. He competes full-time in the ARCA Menards Series and the ARCA Menards Series East, driving the No. 91 and No. 99 Chevrolet for Maples Motorsports, and part-time in the ARCA Menards Series West driving for the same team.

== Racing career ==
Maples first began racing in 1993, driving asphalt late model races at Madera Speedway.

Maples returned to racing in 2019, driving in an IMCA Southern Sport modified after taking a sabbatical that began in 1998 due to familial reasons. Maples also competed in series such as the Sooner Limited Modified Series, and the Touring Outlaw Modified Series from 2019 to 2023.

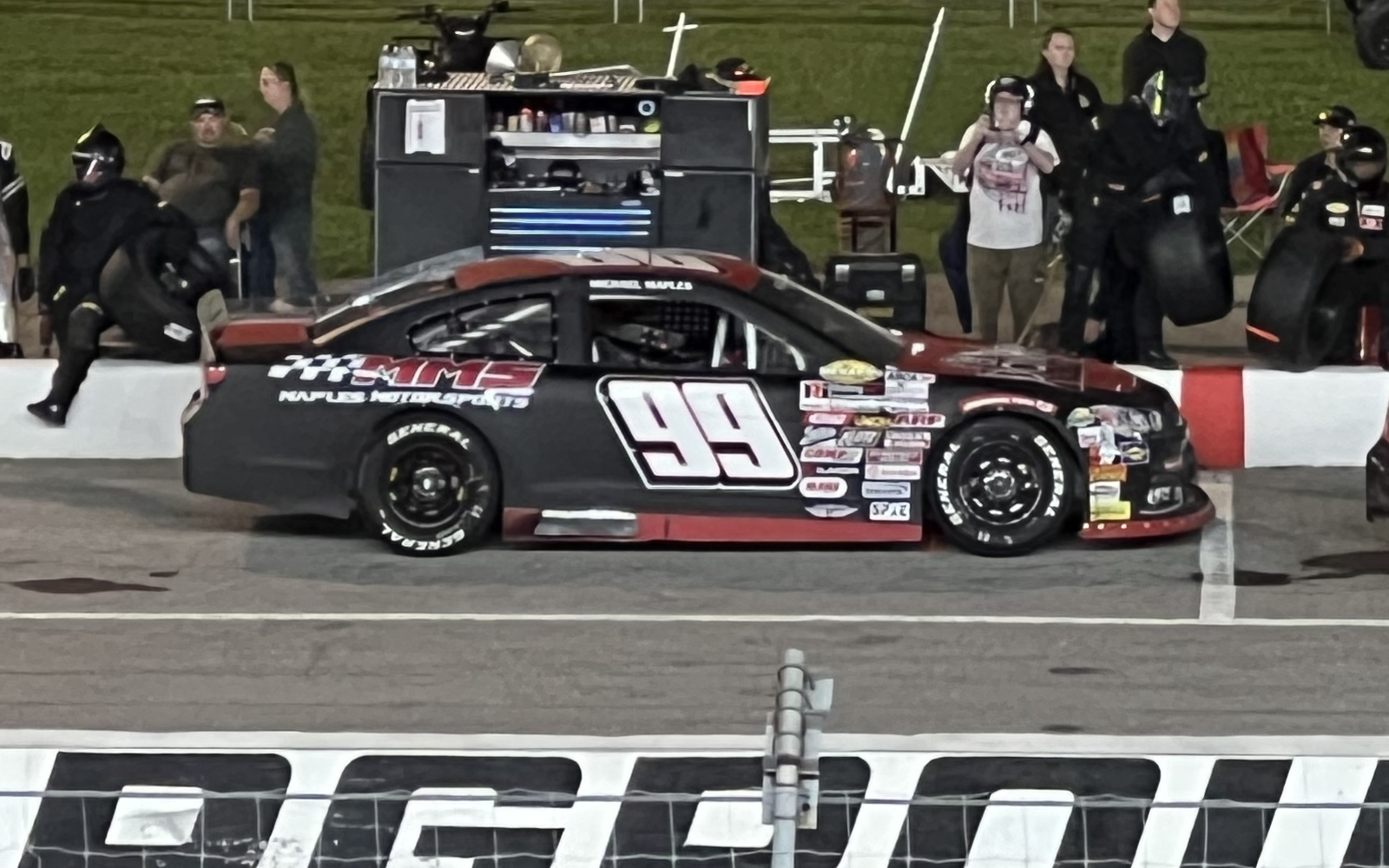
Maples' No. 99 car at Nashville Fairgrounds Speedway in 2024

In 2024, Maples participated in the pre-season test for the ARCA Menards Series at Daytona International Speedway, driving the No. 99 Chevrolet for Fast Track Racing, and placed 53rd in the overall results between the two testing days. Several days after the test, it was announced that Maples would run the full main ARCA and ARCA Menards Series East schedule for Fast Track, driving the No. 99.

In his debut in the main ARCA series at Daytona, Maples qualified in 35th and finished one lap down in 21st despite being involved in a crash between Scott Melton and Willie Mullins with twenty-three laps to go. He would finish eighth in the final points standings, with a best finish of eleventh at Berlin Raceway and Salem Speedway. In the East Series, he would finish seventh in the points after getting a best finish of twelfth in three of the first four races of the season.

In 2025, it was announced that Maples would form his own team, Maples Motorsports, whilst still running full-time. Maples had one top-ten at DuQuoin and finished seventh in the point standings.

== Motorsports career results ==
=== Stock car career summary ===
Season	Series	Team	Races	Wins	Top 5	Top 10	Points	Position
2024	ARCA Menards Series West	Fast Track Racing	1	0	0	0	15	74th
2024	ARCA Menards Series East	Fast Track Racing	8	0	0	0	332	7th
2024	ARCA Menards Series	Fast Track Racing	20	0	0	0	733	8th
2025	ARCA Menards Series West	Maples Motorsports	3	0	0	0	113	18th
2025	ARCA Menards Series East	Maples Motorsports	4	0	0	0	148	13th
2025	ARCA Menards Series	Maples Motorsports	20	0	0	1	729	7th
2026	ARCA Menards Series West	Maples Motorsports	1	0	0	0	24	75th
2026	ARCA Menards Series East	Maples Motorsports	8	0	0	0	226	10th
2026	ARCA Menards Series	Maples Motorsports	20	0	0	0	687	6th

=== ARCA Menards Series ===
(key) (Bold – Pole position awarded by qualifying time. Italics – Pole position earned by points standings or practice time. * – Most laps led. ** – All laps led.)

ARCA Menards Series results
Year	Team	No.	Make	1	2	3	4	5	6	7	8	9	10	11	12	13	14	15	16	17	18	19	20	AMSC	Pts	Ref
2024	Fast Track Racing	99	Chevy	DAY; 21	PHO; 29	TAL; 22	DOV; 14	KAN; 19	CLT; 20	IOW; 13	MOH; 17	BLN; 11	IRP; 15	SLM; 11	ELK; 15	MCH; 20	ISF; 13	MLW; 18	DSF; 14	GLN; 20	BRI; 24	KAN; 16	TOL; 15	8th	733	
2025	Maples Motorsports	99	Chevy	DAY; 31	PHO; 21	TAL; 31	KAN; 12	CLT; 17	MCH; 15	BLN; 13	ELK; 14	LRP; 13	DOV; 13	IRP; 29	IOW; 16	GLN; 18	ISF; 15	MAD; 15	DSF; 9	BRI; 20	SLM; 15	KAN; 22	TOL; 12	7th	729	
2026	Maples Motorsports	99	Chevy	DAY; 12	PHO; 20	KAN; 16	TAL; 25	GLN; 20	TOL; 26	MCH; 16	POC; 18	BER; 14	ELK; 19	CHI; 21	LRP; 23	IRP; Wth	IOW; 20	ISF; 20	MAD; 18	DSF; 21	SLM; 14	BRI; 26	KAN; 15	6th	687	
2026	Maples Motorsports	91	Ford													IRP; 29								6th	687	

==== ARCA Menards Series East ====
ARCA Menards Series East results
Year	Team	No.	Make	1	2	3	4	5	6	7	8	AMSEC	Pts	Ref
2024	Fast Track Racing	99	Chevy	FIF; 12	DOV; 14	NSV; 12	FRS; 12	IOW; 13	IRP; 15	MLW; 18	BRI; 24	7th	332	
2025	Maples Motorsports	99	Chevy	FIF	CAR	NSV	FRS	DOV; 13	IRP; 29	IOW; 16	BRI; 20	13th	148	
2026	Maples Motorsports	99	Chevy	HCY; 17	CAR; 19	NSV; 18	TOL; 26	IRP; Wth	FRS; 21	IOW; 20	BRI; 26	10th	226	
2026	Maples Motorsports	91	Ford					IRP; 29				10th	226	

==== ARCA Menards Series West ====
ARCA Menards Series West results
Year	Team	No.	Make	1	2	3	4	5	6	7	8	9	10	11	12	13	AMSWC	Pts	Ref
2024	Fast Track Racing	99	Chevy	PHO; 29	KER	PIR	SON	IRW	IRW	SHA	TRI	MAD	AAS	KER	PHO		74th	15	
2025	Maples Motorsports	99	Chevy	KER	PHO; 21	TUC	CNS	KER	SON	TRI	PIR	AAS	MAD	LVS; 21	PHO; 26		18th	113	
2026	Maples Motorsports	99	Chevy	KER	PHO; 20	TUC	SHA	CNS	TRI	SON	PIR	AAS	MAD	LVS	PHO	KER	75th	24	
