= Fast Track Racing =

Motor racing team

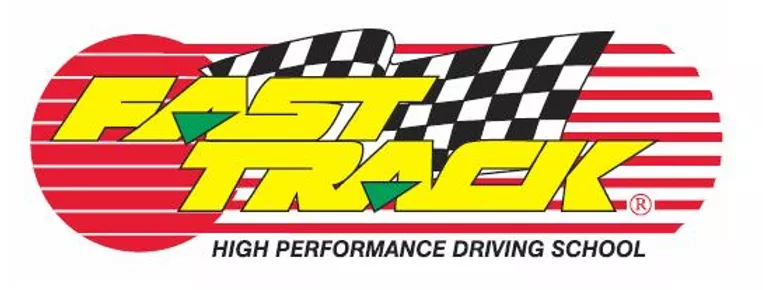
- Owner: Andy Hillenburg
- Base: Harrisburg, North Carolina
- Series: ARCA Menards Series; ARCA Menards Series East; ARCA Menards Series West
- Race drivers: ARCA Menards Series: 01. D. L. Wilson (part-time); 9. Presley Sorah, Nate Moeller (part-time); 10. Ed Pompa, Brad Perez, Craig Pellegrini Jr., TBA; 11. Bryce Haugeberg, Dustin Hillenburg, Robbie Kennealy, TBA; 12. Takuma Koga; ARCA Menards Series East: 10. Craig Pellegrini Jr., TBA; 11. Matt Kemp, Mike Basham, TBA; 12. Dustin Hillenburg, Takuma Koga (part-time); ARCA Menards Series West; 9. Nate Moeller (part-time); 10. Brad Perez (part-time); 11. Dustin Hillenburg (part-time); 12. Takuma Koga (part-time)
- Manufacturer: Chevrolet; Ford; Toyota
- Opened: 1991

Career
- Debut: ARCA Menards Series: 1995 Slick 50 300; ARCA Menards Series East: 2020 Skip's Western Outfitters 175 (New Smyrna); ARCA Menards Series West: 2021 General Tire 150 (Phoenix)
- Latest race: ARCA Menards Series: 2026 Menards 150 (Kansas); ARCA Menards Series East: 2026 Bush's Best 200 (Bristol); ARCA Menards Series West: 2025 General Tire 150 (Phoenix)
- Drivers' Championships: ARCA Menards Series: 1
- Race victories: 2
- Pole positions: 0

Fast Track Racing (also known as Fast Track High-Performance Racing or Fast Track Racing Enterprises) is an American professional stock car racing team that currently competes full time in the ARCA Menards Series and ARCA Menards Series East, fielding the Nos. 01, 10, and 11 for various drivers, and the No. 12 Toyota Camry for Takuma Koga. They also compete part-time in the ARCA Menards Series West. The team has also competed in the NASCAR Nextel Cup Series, the NASCAR Busch Series, and the NASCAR Craftsman Truck Series, as well as the IndyCar Series in the past.

== Cup Series ==
=== History ===
Besides two races in 1991, Fast Track's only two Cup Series attempts came in the 1999 Daytona 500, with them entering the No. 48 Chevrolet for Glen Morgan, and in the 2007 Daytona 500, with them entering the No. 71 Ford driven by Frank Kimmel, but neither entry made the field in either race.

==== Car No. 29 results ====
Year	Driver	No.	Make	1	2	3	4	5	6	7	8	9	10	11	12	13	14	15	16	17	18	19	20	21	22	23	24	25	26	27	28	29	NWCC	Pts
1991	Andy Hillenburg	29	Buick	DAY	RCH	CAR; 40	ATL; 32	DAR	BRI	NWS	MAR	TAL	CLT	DOV	SON	POC	MCH	DAY	POC	TAL	GLN	MCH	BRI	DAR	RCH	DOV	MAR	NWS	CLT	CAR	PHO	ATL		

==== Car No. 48 results ====
Year	Driver	No.	Make	1	2	3	4	5	6	7	8	9	10	11	12	13	14	15	16	17	18	19	20	21	22	23	24	25	26	27	28	29	30	31	32	33	34	NWCC	Pts
1999	Glen Morgan	48	Chevy	DAY; DNQ	CAR	LVS	ATL	DAR	TEX	BRI	MAR	TAL	CAL	RCH	CLT	DOV	MCH	POC	SON	DAY	NHA	POC	IND	GLN	MCH	BRI	DAR	RCH	NHA	DOV	MAR	CLT	TAL	CAR	PHO	HOM	ATL	80th	1

==== Car No. 71 results ====
Year	Driver	No.	Make	1	2	3	4	5	6	7	8	9	10	11	12	13	14	15	16	17	18	19	20	21	22	23	24	25	26	27	28	29	30	31	32	33	34	35	36	NNCC	Pts
2007	Frank Kimmel	71	Ford	DAY; DNQ	CAL	LVS	ATL	BRI	MAR	TEX	PHO	TAL	RCH	DAR	CLT	DOV	POC	MCH	SON	NHA	DAY	CHI	IND	POC	GLN	MCH	BRI	CAL	RCH	NHA	DOV	KAN	TAL	CLT	MAR	ATL	TEX	PHO	HOM	69th	4

== O'Reilly Auto Parts Series ==
=== History ===
In the NASCAR Busch Series (now), Hillenburg entered one race in both 1992 and 1993 in his car, the No. 42, before running a part-time schedule of six races in 1994, although he only qualified for one of those six races. His team did not return until 1997, where he entered his own No. 25 car at Dover. This was his last attempt as a car owner in that series.

==== Car No. 25 results ====
Year	Driver	No.	Make	1	2	3	4	5	6	7	8	9	10	11	12	13	14	15	16	17	18	19	20	21	22	23	24	25	26	27	28	29	30	NBSC	Pts	Ref
1997	Andy Hillenburg	25	Chevy	DAY; 20	CAR	RCH	ATL	LVS	DAR	HCY	TEX	BRI	NSV	TAL	NHA	NZH	CLT	DOV; 34	SBO	GLN	MLW	MYB	GTY	IRP	MCH	BRI	DAR	RCH	DOV	CLT	CAL	CAR	HOM	66th	61	

==== Car No. 42 results ====
Year	Driver	No.	Make	1	2	3	4	5	6	7	8	9	10	11	12	13	14	15	16	17	18	19	20	21	22	23	24	25	26	27	28	29	30	31	NBSC	Pts	Ref
1992	Andy Hillenburg	42	Chevy	DAY	CAR	RCH	ATL	MAR	DAR	BRI	HCY	LAN	DUB	NZH	CLT	DOV	ROU	MYB	GLN	VOL	NHA	TAL	IRP	ROU	MCH	NHA	BRI	DAR	RCH	DOV	CLT	MAR	CAR; 24	HCY	106th	91	
1993	Andy Hillenburg	42	Chevy	DAY	CAR; 22	RCH	DAR	BRI	HCY	ROU	MAR	NZH	CLT	DOV	MYB	GLN	MLW	TAL	IRP	MCH	NHA	BRI	DAR	RCH	DOV	ROU	CLT	MAR	CAR	HCY	ATL				95th	97	
1994	Andy Hillenburg	42	Chevy	DAY; 21	CAR	RCH	ATL; DNQ	MAR; DNQ	DAR	HCY; DNQ	BRI	ROU; DNQ	NHA	NZH	CLT	DOV	MYB	GLN	MLW	SBO	TAL	HCY; DNQ	IRP	MCH	BRI	DAR	RCH	DOV	CLT	MAR	CAR				83rd	100	

== Craftsman Truck Series ==
=== History ===
Fast Track also formerly fielded entries in Truck Series. Most notably, they fielded the No. 47 and 48 teams in between the 2007 and 2010. He previously had fielded a No. 10 truck in two races in 2003 NASCAR Craftsman Truck Series.

==== Truck No. 47 results ====
Year	Driver	No.	Make	1	2	3	4	5	6	7	8	9	10	11	12	13	14	15	16	17	18	19	20	21	22	23	24	25	NGOTC	Pts
2009	Brandon Knupp	47	Chevy	DAY; 31	CAL; 32	ATL; 31				DOV; 34	TEX; 32	MCH; 29	MLW; 30	MEM; 30	KEN; 28		NSH; 28		CHI; 30		GTW; 29		LVS; 28	MAR; 36	TAL; 34	TEX; 31			25th	1750
2009	Brett Butler	47	Chevy				MAR; 26																						25th	1750
2009	Marc Mitchell	47	Chevy					KAN; 30	CLT; 32																				25th	1750
2009	Wayne Edwards	47	Chevy													IRP; 29		BRI; 36		IOW; 30									25th	1750
2009	Chris Lawson	47	Chevy																			NHA; 33							25th	1750
2009	Richard Harriman	47	Chevy																								PHO; 31	HOM; 35	25th	1750

==== Truck No. 48 results ====
Year	Driver	No.	Make	1	2	3	4	5	6	7	8	9	10	11	12	13	14	15	16	17	18	19	20	21	22	23	24	25	NCWTC	Pts
2008	Bryan Silas	48	Chevy	DAY	CAL	ATL	MAR	KAN	CLT	MFD	DOV	TEX	MCH	MLW	MEM	KEN	IRP	NSH	BRI; 28	GTW	NHA	LVS	TAL; 25						46th	252
2008	Hermie Sadler	48	Chevy																					MAR; 26	ATL	TEX	PHO	HOM	46th	252
2009	Bryan Silas	48	Chevy	DAY; 16		ATL; 25																				TEX; 30		HOM; 23	23rd	2132
2009	Dennis Setzer	48	Chevy		CAL; 26																								23rd	2132
2009	Hermie Sadler	48	Chevy				MAR; 19											BRI; 17						MAR; 33					23rd	2132
2009	Brandon Knupp	48	Chevy					KAN; 27	CLT; 28																				23rd	2132
2009	Wayne Edwards	48	Chevy							DOV; 32	TEX; 24	MCH; 23	MLW; 27		KEN; 24		NSH; 24		CHI; 26		GTW; 33		LVS; 27						23rd	2132
2009	Hal Martin	48	Chevy											MEM; 26															23rd	2132
2009	Richard Harriman	48	Chevy													IRP; 27						NHA; 27							23rd	2132
2009	Pierre Bourque	48	Chevy																	IOW; 29									23rd	2132
2009	Mike Wallace	48	Chevy																						TAL; 28				23rd	2132
2009	Dan Brode	48	Chevy																								PHO; 30		23rd	2132
2010	Bryan Silas	48	Chevy	DAY; 32																					TAL; 25	TEX	PHO		32nd	1270
2010	Tim Bainey Jr.	48	Chevy		ATL; 31		NSH; 33	KAN	DOV							POC; 25													32nd	1270
2010	Hermie Sadler	48	Chevy			MAR; 12				CLT; 19	TEX	MCH; 20							BRI; 32	CHI	KEN	NHA	LVS	MAR; 14				HOM; 22	32nd	1270
2010	Chad McCumbee	48	Chevy										IOW; 31																32nd	1270
2010	Richard Harriman	48	Chevy											GTW; DNQ															32nd	1270
2010	Michelle Theriault	48	Chevy												IRP; 32		NSH; 27	DAR											32nd	1270

== ARCA Menards Series East ==
=== Car No. 01 history ===
For 2020, Fast Track expanded to a fourth car for select races, beginning with the season opening Lucas Oil 200 at Daytona.

On December 22, 2021, Stephanie Moyer announced a partnership with Fast Track for the full 2022 ARCA Menards Series East season, including the combination races at Iowa Speedway, The Milwaukee Mile & Bristol Motor Speedway. She later announced the addition of Pocono Raceway to her schedule.

Moyer finished the season in fourth place, becoming the highest placing woman in East Series history.

Following the completion of the 2022 ARCA Menards Series, the team fielded the No. 01 for Zach Herrin in the West Series finale at Phoenix Raceway.

=== Car No. 01 results ===
Year	Driver	No.	Make	1	2	3	4	5	6	7	8	AMSEC	Pts	Ref
2021	Stephanie Moyer	01	Toyota	NSM	FIF	NSV	DOV	SNM	IOW; 23			23rd	118	
2021	Jason Miles	01	Chevy							MLW; 18		23rd	118	
2021	Richard Garvie	01	Toyota								BRI; 23	23rd	118	
2022	Stephanie Moyer	01	Toyota	NSM; 9	FIF; 12	DOV; 12	NSV; 11	IOW; 21	MLW; 24	BRI; 21		4th	248	
2024	Blaine Donahue	01	Toyota	FIF	DOV	NSV	FRS; 7	IOW				30th	67	
2024	Cody Dennison	01	Toyota						IRP; 14	MLW	BRI	30th	67	
2025	E. J. Tamayo	01	Ford	FIF; 18								11th	273	
2025	Tim Monroe	01	Ford		CAR; 14							11th	273	
2025	Rita Goulet	01	Chevy			NSH; 16						11th	273	
2025	Jeff Smith	01	Ford				FRS; 15					11th	273	
2025	Matt Kemp	01	Toyota					DOV; 24	IRP; 32			11th	273	
2025	Trevor Ward	01	Toyota							IOW; 26		11th	273	
2025	Mike Basham	01	Toyota								BRI; 25	11th	273	

==== Car No. 9 results ====
Year	Driver	No.	Make	1	2	3	4	5	6	7	8	AMSEC	Pts	Ref
2025	Cody Dennison	9	Toyota	FIF; 17					IRP; 18			9th	299	
2025	Blaine Donahue	9	Toyota		CAR; 16			DOV; 23				9th	299	
2025	Mike Basham	9	Ford			NSH; 15						9th	299	
2025	Mike Basham	9	Toyota							IOW; 25		9th	299	
2025	Trevor Ward	9	Toyota				FRS; 14					9th	299	
2025	Logan Misuraca	9	Chevy								BRI; 25	9th	299	

=== Car No. 10 history ===
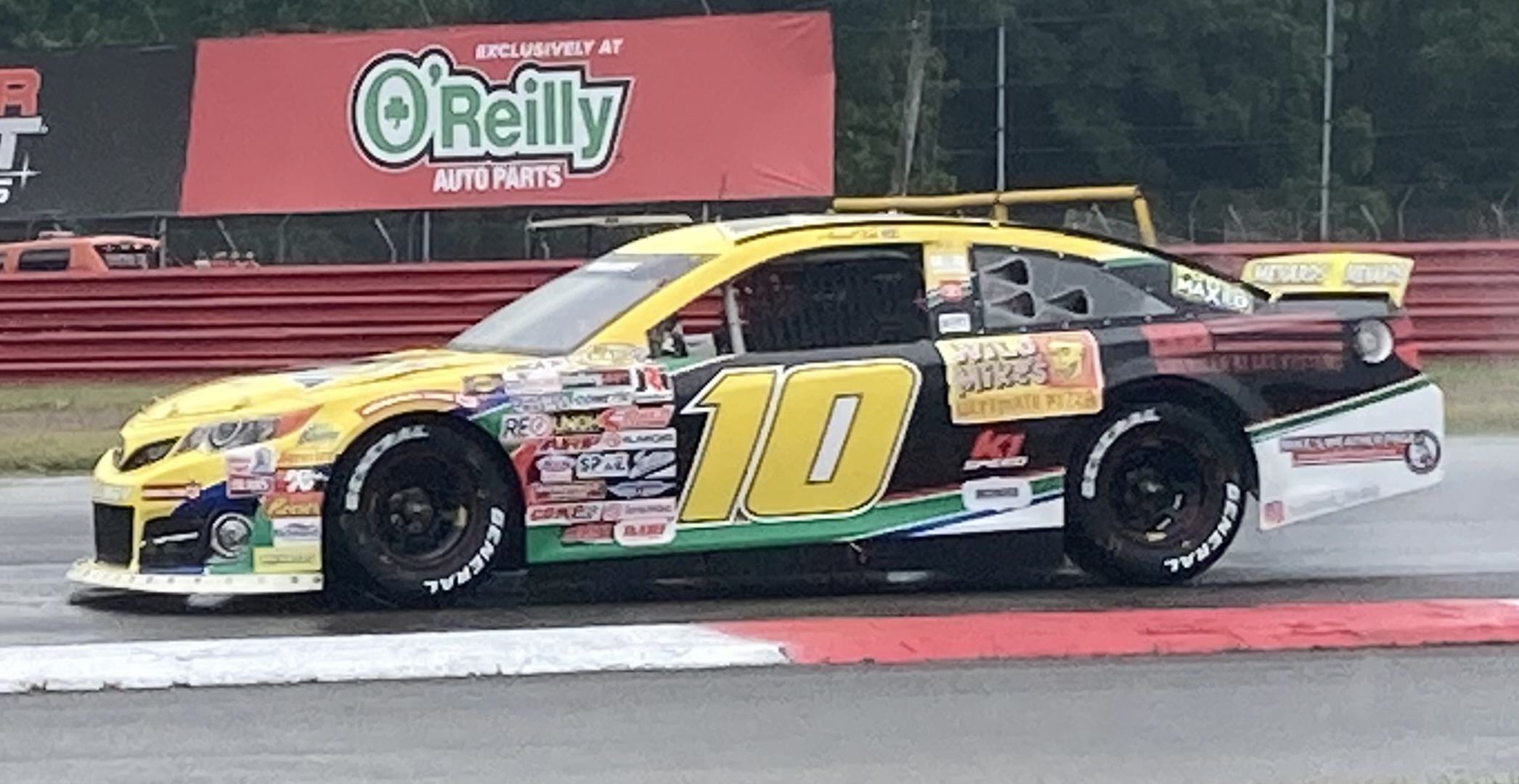
Arnout Kok driving the #10 at Mid-Ohio in the 2022 Dawn 150

Towards the end of 2018, it was announced that Tommy Vigh Jr. would pilot the #10 car for the full 2019 campaign.

With sponsorship from Extreme Kleaner, Tommy would go on to post one Top 10 finish and hold on to earn the Rookie of the Year award. Vigh became the oldest recipient of such an award in ARCA Racing Series history.

Ken Schrader piloted his old friend's #10 in two races, DuQuoin and Salem Speedway. This stretch produced one top 5, a 3rd place at DuQuoin, and two top 10's.

==== Car No. 10 results ====
Year	Driver	No.	Make	1	2	3	4	5	6	7	8	AMSEC	Pts	Ref
2020	Tommy Vigh Jr.	10	Chevy	NSM	TOL	DOV; 15						12th	154	
2020	Owen Smith	10	Chevy				TOL; 18					12th	154	
2020	Mike Basham	10	Chevy					BRI; 24				12th	154	
2020	Richard Garvie	10	Ford						FIF; 15			12th	154	
2021	Dick Doheny	10	Toyota	NSM; 15	FIF; 12	NSV; 12						8th	314	
2021	Ed Pompa	10	Toyota				DOV; 10					8th	314	
2021	Owen Smith	10	Ford					SNM; 14				8th	314	
2021	D. L. Wilson	10	Chevy						IOW; 16			8th	314	
2021	Arnout Kok	10	Toyota							MLW; 24		8th	314	
2021	Jade Buford	10	Toyota								BRI; 18	8th	314	
2022	Ed Pompa	10	Toyota	NSM; 10								4th	313	
2022	Benny Chastain	10	Toyota		FIF; Wth							4th	313	
2022	Nate Moeller (Note: Benny Chastain, the driver of the No. 10 Toyota for Fast Track Racing, crashed in practice for the race at Five Flags (race #2) and did not have a backup car. The team made a deal with Wayne Peterson Racing to renumber Nate Moeller's No. 06 Ford to the No. 10 and use their owner points in the race.)	10	Ford		FIF; 15							4th	313	
2022	Tim Monroe	10	Toyota			DOV; 14			MLW; 26	BRI; 30		4th	313	
2022	Matt Wilson	10	Toyota				NSV; 9					4th	313	
2022	Tanner Allen	10	Toyota					IOW; 20				4th	313	
2024	Mike Basham	10	Ford	FIF; 6								6th	359	
2024	Ed Pompa	10	Ford		DOV; 13							6th	359	
2024	Jayson Alexander	10	Toyota			NSV; 8	FRS; 8		IRP; 18			6th	359	
2024	Christopher Tate	10	Toyota					IOW; 10				6th	359	
2024	Cody Dennison	10	Toyota							MLW; 13	BRI; 17	6th	359	
2025	Mike Basham	10	Ford	FIF; 13								5th	344	
2025	Eloy Falcon	10	Chevy		CAR; 3							5th	344	
2025	D. L. Wilson	10	Toyota			NSH; 13						5th	344	
2025	Matt Kemp	10	Ford				FRS; 4					5th	344	
2025	Tony Cosentino	10	Ford					DOV; 23	IRP; 21	IOW; 14	BRI; 18	5th	344	
2026	Craig Pellegrini Jr.	10	Toyota	HCY; 9	ROC; 10	NSV; 6	TOL; 10	IRP; 17	FRS; 9	IOW; 14	BRI	-*	-*	

=== Car No. 11 history ===
Following his victory in the season opening ARCA 200, Andy Hillenburg fielded his own car for the remaining 20 races of the season. Hillenburg would then on to win once more at Flat Rock Speedway, before battling down the stretch to claim the championship in 1995.

On December 6, 2022, the team announced that Zachary Tinkle would be driving the No. 11 for the full 2023 ARCA Menards Series East, including the four combination races with the 2023 ARCA Menards Series

==== Car No. 11 results ====
Year	Driver	No.	Make	1	2	3	4	5	6	7	8	AMSEC	Pts	Ref
2020	Chuck Hiers	11	Toyota	NSM; 22								10th	256	
2020	Mike Basham	11	Toyota		TOL; 13							10th	256	
2020	Ed Pompa	11	Toyota			DOV; 13						10th	256	
2020	Rick Clifton	11	Ford				TOL; 19					10th	256	
2020	Owen Smith	11	Ford					BRI; 22				10th	256	
2020	D. L. Wilson	11	Chevy						FIF; 19			10th	256	
2021	Richard Garvie	11	Ford	NSM; 12	FIF; 10							7th	355	
2021	Mason Mingus	11	Ford			NSV; 3		SNM; 8			BRI; 17	7th	355	
2021	Jade Buford	11	Ford				DOV; 9					7th	355	
2021	Bryce Haugeberg	11	Chevy						IOW; 17			7th	355	
2021	Tony Cosentino	11	Toyota							MLW; 23		7th	355	
2022	Willie Mullins	11	Toyota	NSM; 8	FIF; 5							4th	313	
2022	Ed Pompa	11	Ford			DOV; 15						4th	313	
2022	Ryan Roulette	11	Ford				NSV; 10					4th	313	
2022	Bryce Haugeberg	11	Chevy					IOW; 14				4th	313	
2022	Bryce Haugeberg	11	Toyota						MLW; 19			4th	313	
2022	Zachary Tinkle	11	Ford							BRI; 20		4th	313	
2023	Zachary Tinkle	11	Toyota	FIF; 7	DOV; 6	NSV; 7	FRS; 6	IOW; 11	IRP; 13	MLW; 13	BRI; 13	4th	336	
2024	Zachary Tinkle	11	Toyota	FIF; 8	DOV; 10	NSV; 4	FRS; 5	IOW; 20	IRP; 11	MLW; 12	BRI; 11	4th	321	
2025	Zachary Tinkle	11	Toyota	FIF; 10	CAR; 11	NSV; 5	FRS; 6	DOV; 9	IRP; 16	IOW; 12	BRI; 31	4th	352	

=== Car No. 12 history ===
For the first time in its history, Fast Track fielded a third car at the season opening Lucas Oil 200 for 2018, borrowing the No. 06 from Wayne Peterson Racing. Chuck Hiers piloted the car in this race, leading 1 lap and finishing 16th.

Fast Track opened up the 2019 season in Daytona again with Chuck Hiers behind the wheel of the team's new number No. 1 car. Chuck finished the race 14th."Driver".

Following the 2020 Merger of ARCA and the NASCAR K&N Pro Series divisions, Team Owner Andy Hillenburg opted to change No.1 to No. 12 in order for Hattori Racing Enterprises to maintain their usage of the No. 1 from K&N.

On January 2, 2023, it was announced D.L. Wilson would return to the team's No. 12 car for a total of 9 races; the full East Series season, and the Spring Phoenix Raceway event.

On January 30, 2025, it was announced that Takuma Koga would drive full-time in 2025.

==== Car No. 12 results ====
Year	Driver	No.	Make	1	2	3	4	5	6	7	8	AMSEC	Pts	Ref
2020	Mike Basham	12	Toyota	NSM	TOL	DOV	TOL; 12		FIF			12th	154	
2020	Kris Wright	12	Chevy					BRI; 15				12th	154	
2021	Stephanie Moyer	12	Toyota	NSM	FIF; 8	NSV; 10		SNM; 13		MLW; 20		8th	314	
2021	Dick Doheny	12	Toyota				DOV; 15					8th	314	
2021	Tony Cosentino	12	Toyota						IOW; 22			8th	314	
2021	D. L. Wilson	12	Toyota								BRI; 28	8th	314	
2022	Tony Cosentino	12	Toyota	NSM; 14								6th	297	
2022	Tony Cosentino	12	Chevy				NSV; 14					6th	297	
2022	Tim Monroe	12	Chevy		FIF; 13							6th	297	
2022	Tommy Vigh Jr.	12	Chevy			DOV; 13						6th	297	
2022	D. L. Wilson	12	Toyota					IOW; 19				6th	297	
2022	D. L. Wilson	12	Chevy							BRI; 18		6th	297	
2022	Zachary Tinkle	12	Ford						MLW; 20			6th	297	
2023	Ryan Roulette	12	Ford	FIF	DOV	NSV	FRS; 12	IOW	IRP	MLW	BRI; 18	27th	58	
2024	Presley Sorah	12	Ford	FIF; 14		NSV; 18						11th	315	
2024	Presley Sorah	12	Toyota						IRP; 24			11th	315	
2024	Mike Basham	12	Toyota		DOV; 24							11th	315	
2024	Matt Kemp	12	Toyota				FRS; 6					11th	315	
2024	Ryan Roulette	12	Ford					IOW; 15		MLW; 17		11th	315	
2024	Eric Caudell	12	Chevy								BRI; 14	11th	315	
2025	Takuma Koga	12	Toyota	FIF; 11	CAR; 15	NSH; 7	FRS; 3	DOV; 15	IRP; 31	IOW; 22	BRI; 33	6th	315	

==== Car No. 99 results ====
Year	Driver	No.	Make	1	2	3	4	5	6	7	8	AMSEC	Pts	Ref
2024	Michael Maples	99	Chevy	FIF; 12	DOV; 14	NSV; 12	FRS; 12	IOW; 13	IRP; 15	MLW; 18	BRI; 24	9th	332	

== ARCA Menards Series West ==
=== Car No. 01 results ===
Year	Driver	No.	Make	1	2	3	4	5	6	7	8	9	10	11	AMSWC	Pts	Ref
2021	Bryce Haugeberg	01	Chevy	PHO; 25	SON	IRW	CNS	IRW	PIR	LVS	AAS	PHO			62nd	19	
2022	Tim Monroe	01	Chevy	PHO; 33	IRW	KCR	PIR	SON	IRW	EVG	PIR	AAS	LVS		37th	87	
2022	Zach Herrin	01	Toyota											PHO; 18	37th	87	

=== Car No. 9 results ===
Year	Driver	No.	Make	1	2	3	4	5	6	7	8	9	10	11	12	AMSWC	Pts	Ref
2025	Tony Cosentino	9	Toyota	KER	PHO; 26	TUC	CNS	KER	SON	TRI	PIR	AAS	MAD	LVS	PHO			

=== Car No. 10 results ===
Year	Driver	No.	Make	1	2	3	4	5	6	7	8	9	10	11	12	AMSWC	Pts	Ref
2021	Mark Lowrey	10	Ford	PHO; 14	SON	IRW	CNS	IRW	PIR	LVS	AAS	PHO				43rd	30	
2022	Zachary Tinkle	10	Toyota	PHO; 29	IRW	KCR	PIR	SON	IRW	EVG	PIR	AAS	LVS	PHO		56th	15	
2023	Tim Monroe	10	Ford	PHO; 31	IRW	KCR	PIR	SON	IRW	SHA	EVG	AAS	LVS	MAD	PHO			
2024	Brayton Laster	10	Ford	PHO; 37	KER	PIR	SON	IRW	IRW	SHA	TRI	MAD	AAS	KER	PHO			
2025	Brad Perez	10	Ford	KER	PHO; 30	TUC	CNS	KER	SON	TRI	PIR	AAS	MAD	LVS	PHO			

=== Car No. 11 results ===
Year	Driver	No.	Make	1	2	3	4	5	6	7	8	9	10	11	12	AMSWC	Pts	Ref
2021	Richard Garvie	11	Toyota	PHO; 19	SON	IRW	CNS	IRW	PIR	LVS	AAS	PHO				57th	25	
2022	Bryce Haugeberg	11	Chevy	PHO; 28	IRW	KCR	PIR	SON	IRW	EVG	PIR	AAS	LVS	PHO		65th	16	
2023	Bryce Haugeberg	11	Ford	PHO; 32	IRW	KCR	PIR	SON	IRW	SHA	EVG	AAS	LVS	MAD	PHO			
2024	Brad Perez	11	Ford	PHO; 38	KER	PIR	SON	IRW	IRW	SHA	TRI	MAD	AAS	KER	PHO			
2025	Cody Dennison	11	Toyota	KER	PHO; 16	TUC	CNS	KER	SON	TRI	PIR	AAS	MAD					
2025	Bryce Haugeberg	11	Ford											LVS; 19	PHO			

=== Car No. 12 results ===
Year	Driver	No.	Make	1	2	3	4	5	6	7	8	9	10	11	12	AMSWC	Pts	Ref
2021	D. L. Wilson	12	Chevy	PHO; 20	SON	IRW	CNS	IRW	PIR	LVS	AAS	PHO				46th	24	
2022	D. L. Wilson	12	Chevy	PHO; 24	IRW	KCR	PIR	SON	IRW	EVG	PIR	AAS	LVS	PHO		53rd	20	
2023	D. L. Wilson	12	Chevy	PHO; 24														
2023	Ryan Roulette	12	Ford		IRW	KCR	PIR	SON	IRW	SHA	EVG	AAS	LVS	MAD	PHO; 24			
2024	Ryan Roulette	12	Ford	PHO; 28	KER	PIR	SON	IRW	IRW	SHA	TRI	MAD	AAS	KER	PHO			
2025	Tim Monroe	12	Ford	KER	PHO; 23	TUC	CNS	KER	SON	TRI	PIR	AAS	MAD					
2025	Dustin Hillenburg	12	Toyota											LVS; 18	PHO			

=== Car No. 99 results ===
Year	Driver	No.	Make	1	2	3	4	5	6	7	8	9	10	11	12	AMSWC	Pts	Ref
2024	Michael Maples	99	Chevy	PHO; 29	KER	PIR	SON	IRW	IRW	SHA	TRI	MAD	AAS	KER	PHO			

== IndyCar Series ==
=== History ===
The team's only IndyCar start came in 2000 when Andy Hillenburg drove his own No. 48 Oldsmobile powered Dallara to a 28th place finish at that years Indianapolis 500.

=== IRL IndyCar Series results ===
Year	Driver	Chassis	No.	Engine	1	2	3	4	5	6	7	8	9	Rank	Points
2000	Andy Hillenburg	Dallara	48	Oldsmobile	WDW	PHX	LSV	INDY; 28	TEX	PIK	ATL	KTY	TEX	48th	2

=== Indianapolis 500 results ===
Year	Chassis	Engine	Start	Finish	Note	Team
2000	Dallara	Aurora	33rd	28th	Wheel Bearing	Fast Track
