= SPS Racing =

American stock car racing team

- Owner: Joe Farré
- Base: Mooresville, North Carolina
- Series: NASCAR O'Reilly Auto Parts Series; ARCA Menards Series; ARCA Menards Series East
- Race drivers: NASCAR O'Reilly Auto Parts Series: 43. Connor Mosack; ARCA Menards Series: 24. Daniel Dye, Caden Kvapil (part-time); ARCA Menards Series East: 24. Connor Hall, Caden Kvapil (part-time)
- Manufacturer: Ford; Chevy

Career
- Debut: 2023
- Races competed: Total: 59; O'Reilly Auto Parts Series: 2 ARCA Menards Series: 22; ARCA Menards Series East: 13; ARCA Menards Series West: 22
- Drivers' Championships: Total: O'Reilly Auto Parts Series: 0 ARCA Menards Series: 0 ARCA Menards Series East: 0 ARCA Menards Series West: 0
- Race victories: Total: 1 O'Reilly Auto Parts Series: 0 ARCA Menards Series: 0 ARCA Menards Series East: 0 ARCA Menards Series West: 1
- Pole positions: Total: 2 O'Reilly Auto Parts Series: 0 ARCA Menards Series: 0 ARCA Menards Series East: 0 ARCA Menards Series West: 2

SPS Racing (formerly Sigma Performance Services) is an American professional auto racing team that currently competes in the NASCAR O'Reilly Auto Parts Series, ARCA Menards Series, ARCA Menards Series East and ARCA Menards Series West. The team is based in Mooresville, North Carolina.

== NASCAR O'Reilly Auto Parts Series ==
On November 24, 2025, the team announced that they had purchased AM Racing, a team that had been competing in what had been the NASCAR Xfinity Series. They will field an entry in the newly-rebranded O'Reilly Auto Parts Series in 2026. The team has yet to announce the car number, driver(s), sponsors and the crew chief and whether the entry will be fielded full or part-time. Although on January 30, 2026, it was announced that the acquisition of AM Racing was never finalized.

=== Car No. 43 history ===
On September 9, 2026, it was announced that Landon S. Huffman would drive their No. 43 at Bristol night race while Connor Mosack would drive the No. 43 at fall Phoenix and Talladega race.

==== Car No. 43 results ====
Year	Driver	No.	Make	1	2	3	4	5	6	7	8	9	10	11	12	13	14	15	16	17	18	19	20	21	22	23	24	25	26	27	28	29	30	31	32	33	Owners	Pts
2026	Landon S. Huffman	43	Chevy	DAY	ATL	COA	PHO	LVS	DAR	MAR	ROC	BRI	KAN	TAL	TEX	GLN	DOV	CLT	NSS	POC	COR	SON	CHI	ATL	IND	IOW	DAY	DAR	GTW	BRI; DNQ	LVS	CLT					43rd	50
2026	Connor Mosack	43	Chevy																														PHO; 30	TAL; 19	MAR	HOM	43rd	50

== ARCA Menards Series ==
=== Car No. 23 history ===
SPS made their debut in the ARCA Menards Series in 2024. They fielded the No. 23 car for Grant Enfinger at season-opener at Phoenix Raceway. Enfinger finished third. Mason Mitchell drove the No. 23 car at Iowa Speedway. He finished fourth. Connor Mosack drove the No. 23 car at Watkins Glen. He finished fifth.

On December 30, 2024, SPS announced that Tyler Reif would return to the team in 2025 to run full-time in the ARCA Menards Series East for the first time and part-time in the main ARCA Menards Series in their No. 23 car. On January 7, 2025, it was announced that Legge would make her ARCA debut in the 2025 season-opener at Daytona in the No. 23 car. She finished 39th after being involved in an early wreck. Spencer Gallagher would drive the No. 23 at Talladega Superspeedway, Kansas Speedway, and Charlotte Motor Speedway.

==== Car No. 23 results ====
Year	Driver	No.	Make	1	2	3	4	5	6	7	8	9	10	11	12	13	14	15	16	17	18	19	20	Owners	Pts
2024	Grant Enfinger	23	Chevy	DAY	PHO; 3	TAL	DOV	KAN	CLT															23rd	158
2024	Mason Mitchell	23	Chevy							IOW; 4	MOH	BLN	IRP	SLM	ELK	MCH	ISF	MLW	DSF					23rd	158
2024	Connor Mosack	23	Chevy																	GLN; 5	BRI	KAN	TOL	23rd	158
2025	Katherine Legge	23	Chevy	DAY; 39																				20th	445
2025	Tyler Reif	23	Chevy		PHO; 19				MCH; 7	BLN	ELK	LRP	DOV; 5	IRP; 14	IOW; 11	GLN; 2	ISF	MAD	DSF	BRI; 6	SLM	KAN; 13	TOL; 5	20th	445
2025	Spencer Gallagher	23	Chevy			TAL; 23	KAN; 9	CLT; 25																20th	445

=== Car No. 24 history ===
In 2024, owner Joe Farré would attempt the season opening race at Phoenix Raceway in the No. 24 car, Farré finished in 35th due to electrical issues.

In 2026, Daniel Dye would drive the No. 24 car at Daytona, Kansas, Talladega, Michigan, Pocono, and Chicagoland. Caden Kvapil would make his ARCA Menards Series debut at Toledo in the No. 24 car.

==== Car No. 24 results ====
Year	Driver	No.	Make	1	2	3	4	5	6	7	8	9	10	11	12	13	14	15	16	17	18	19	20	Owners	Pts
2024	Joe Farré	24	Chevy	DAY	PHO; 35	TAL	DOV	KAN	CLT	IOW	MOH	BLN	IRP	SLM	ELK	MCH	ISF	MLW	DSF	GLN	BRI	KAN	TOL	78th	9
2026	Daniel Dye	24	Ford	DAY; 4	PHO		TAL; 10	GLN																24th	260
2026	Daniel Dye	24	Chevy			KAN; 2				MCH; 19	POC; 7	BER	ELK	CHI; 4	LRP	IRP	IOW	ISF	MAD	DSF	SLM	BRI	KAN	24th	260
2026	Caden Kvapil	24	Chevy						TOL; 5															24th	260

== ARCA Menards Series East ==
=== Car No. 23 history ===
SPS made their debut in the ARCA Menards Series East in 2024. They fielded the No. 23 car for Mason Mitchell at Iowa and Tyler Reif at Bristol.

On December 30, 2024, SPS announced that Tyler Reif would return to the team in 2025 to run full-time in the ARCA Menards Series East for the first time and part-time in the main ARCA Menards Series in their No. 23 car.

==== Car No. 23 results ====
Year	Driver	No.	Make	1	2	3	4	5	6	7	8	Owners	Pts
2024	Mason Mitchell	23	Chevy	FIF	DOV	NSV	FRS	IOW; 4	IRP	MLW		28th	78
2024	Tyler Reif	23	Chevy								BRI; 6	28th	78
2025	Tyler Reif	23	Chevy	FIF; 3	CAR; 17	NSH; 2	FRS; 2	DOV; 5	IRP; 14	IOW; 11	BRI; 6	3rd	388

=== Car No. 24 history ===
On April 11, 2025, SPS announced that Spencer Gallagher will drive the No. 24 car at Rockingham.

In 2026, Connor Hall would drive the No. 24 at Hickory and Rockigham. Caden Kvapil would make his ARCA Menards Series East debut at Toledo in the No. 24 car.

==== Car No. 24 results ====
Year	Driver	No.	Make	1	2	3	4	5	6	7	8	Onwers	Pts
2025	Spencer Gallagher	24	Chevy	FIF	CAR; 10	NSH	FRS	DOV	IRP	IOW	BRI	43rd	34
2026	Connor Hall	24	Chevy	HCY; 15	ROC; 17	NSV						29th	95
2026	Caden Kvapil	24	Chevy				TOL; 5	IRP	FRS	IOW	BRI	29th	95

== ARCA Menards Series West ==
=== Car No. 23 history ===
In 2023, Farré signed Bradley Erickson to drive the No. 23 car from the seventh race onwards after making the team.

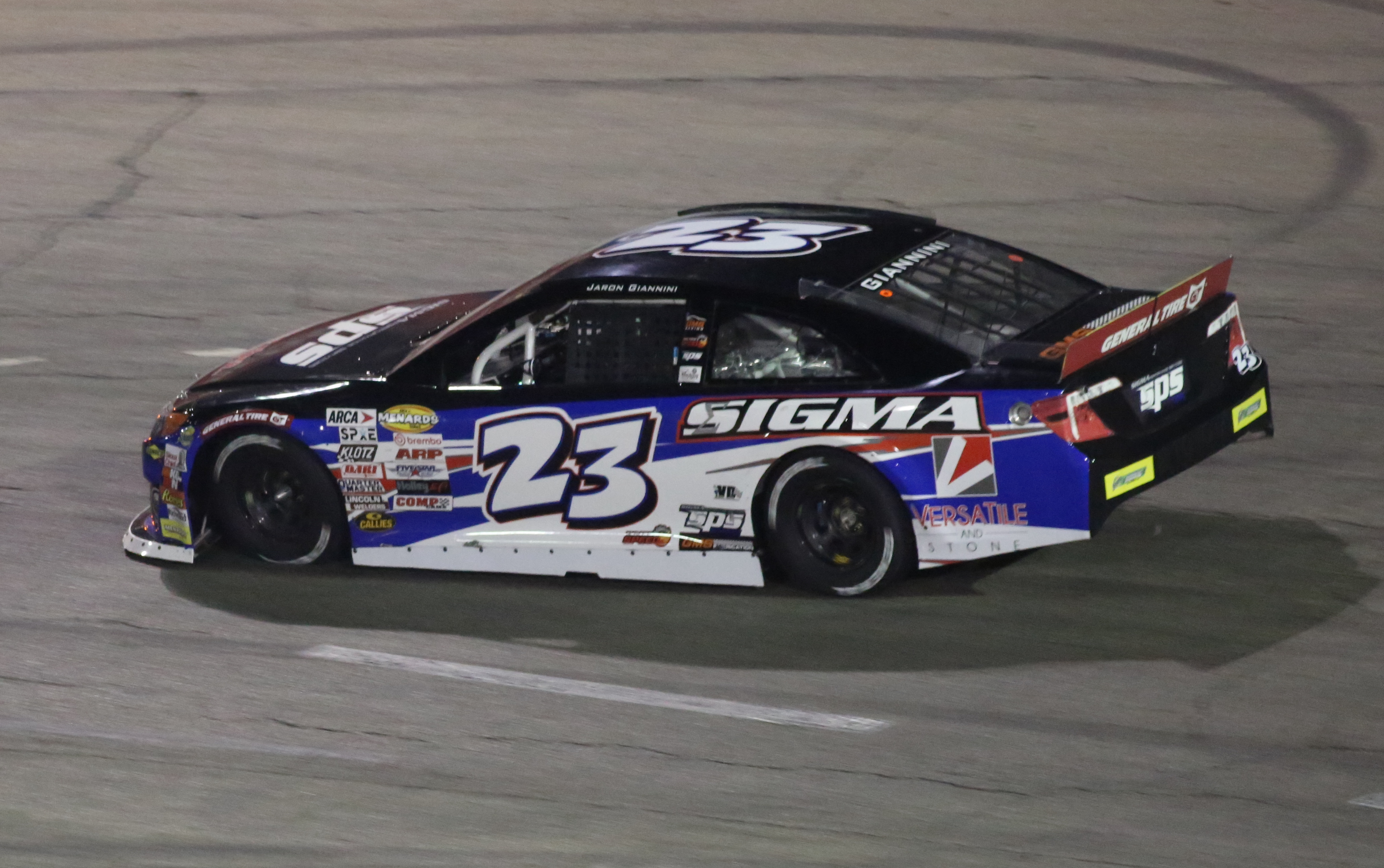
Jaron Giannini at All American Speedway in 2024.

In 2024, the team fielded nine drivers. At Sonoma, Sam Mayer would score the team's first pole and win the same night. At Tri-City, the team would sign 2000 NASCAR Craftsman Truck Series and 2002 NASCAR Busch Series champion Greg Biffle. Biffle would finish in ninth place.

In 2025, SPS fielded the No. 23 for Tyler Reif at Phoenix and Greg Biffle at Tri City.

==== Car No. 23 results ====
Year	Driver	No.	Make	1	2	3	4	5	6	7	8	9	10	11	12	Owners	Pts
2023	Bradley Erickson	23	Toyota	PHO	IRW	KCR	PIR	SON	IRW	SHA	EVG	AAS; 14	LVS; 21	MAD; 4		19th	180
2023	Bradley Erickson	23	Chevy												PHO; 7	19th	180
2024	Grant Enfinger	23	Chevy	PHO; 3												3rd	589
2024	Mason Mitchell	23	Chevy		KER; 18											3rd	589
2024	Jake Walker	23	Chevy			PIR; 18										3rd	589
2024	Sam Mayer	23	Chevy				SON; 1*									3rd	589
2024	Jaron Giannini	23	Chevy					IRW; 6	IRW; 5							3rd	589
2024	Jaron Giannini	23	Toyota							SHA; 11		MAD; 6	AAS; 7	KER; 7		3rd	589
2024	Greg Biffle	23	Chevy								TRI; 9					3rd	589
2024	Kaden Honeycutt	23	Chevy												PHO; 6	3rd	589
2025	Tyler Reif	23	Chevy	KER	PHO; 19	TUC	CNS	KER	SON							13th	165
2025	Greg Biffle	23	Chevy							TRI; 3	PIR	AAS	MAD	LVS	PHO	13th	165

=== Car No. 24 history ===
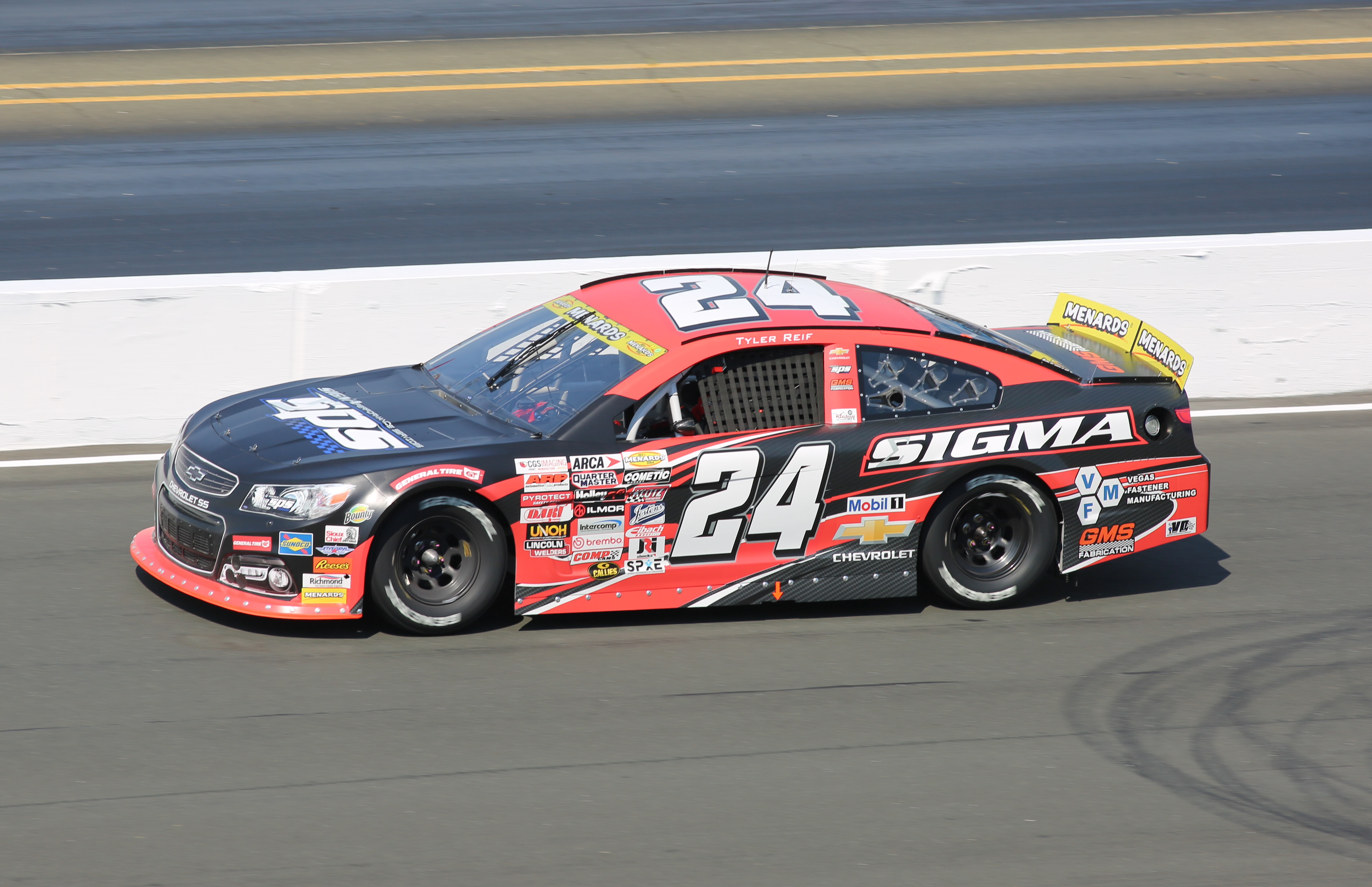
Tyler Reif in the No. 24 car at Sonoma Raceway in 2025

At the 2024 season opening race at Phoenix Raceway, Farré finished 35th in the No. 24 car due to electrical issues. He was originally scheduled to enter in the next race at Kevin Harvick's Kern Raceway, but had to withdraw due to his company overseeing the cleanup of the Francis Scott Key Bridge, which had collapsed weeks prior; he would be replaced by Sean Hingorani, who finished in fourth.

In 2025, SPS fielded the No. 24 for Tyler Reif, Greg Biffle and Connor Hall. Reif drove the car at Sonoma, Biffle at Portland, and Hall at Las Vegas Bullring and Phoenix.

==== Car No. 24 results ====
Year	Driver	No.	Make	1	2	3	4	5	6	7	8	9	10	11	12	Owners	Pts
2024	Joe Farré	24	Chevy	PHO; 35												37th	49
2024	Sean Hingorani	24	Chevy		KER; 4	PIR	SON	IRW	IRW	SHA	TRI	MAD	AAS	KER	PHO	37th	49
2025	Tyler Reif	24	Chevy	KER	PHO	TUC	CNS	KER	SON; 5	TRI						12th	190
2025	Greg Biffle	24	Chevy								PIR; 4	AAS	MAD			12th	190
2025	Connor Hall	24	Chevy											LVS; 2	PHO; 7	12th	190
