= 2024 MMI Oil Workers 150 =

2nd race of the 2024 ARCA Menards Series West

2024 MMI Oil Workers 150 presented by the West Coast Stock Car Motorsports Hall of Fame
Race details
- Race 2 of 12 of the 2024 ARCA Menards Series West
- Date: April 20, 2024
- Official name: 8th Annual MMI Oil Workers 150 presented by the West Coast Stock Car Motorsports Hall of Fame
- Location: Kevin Harvick's Kern Raceway in Bakersfield, California
- Course: Permanent racing facility
- Course length: 0.50 miles (0.80 km)
- Distance: 150 laps, 75 mi (120 km)
- Scheduled distance: 150 laps, 75 mi (120 km)
- Average speed: 69.427 mph (111.732 km/h)

Pole position
Driver	Tyler Reif	Central Coast Racing
- Time: 18.464

Most laps led
Driver	Tyler Reif	Central Coast Racing
- Laps: 104

Winner
No. 5	Kole Raz	Jerry Pitts Racing

Television in the United States
- Network: FloRacing
- Announcers: Charles Krall

Radio in the United States
- Radio: ARCA Racing Network

The 2024 MMI Oil Workers 150 presented by the West Coast Stock Car Motorsports Hall of Fame was the 2nd stock car race of the 2024 ARCA Menards Series West season, and the 8th running of the event. The race was held on Saturday, April 20, 2024, at Kevin Harvick's Kern Raceway in Bakersfield, California, a 0.50 mile (0.80 km) permanent asphalt quad-oval shaped short track. The race took the scheduled 150 laps to complete. In a wild finish, Kole Raz, driving for Jerry Pitts Racing, would take the win after a hard-fought battle between Trevor Huddleston in the final few laps of the race. This was Raz's first career ARCA Menards Series West win. Pole-sitter Tyler Reif dominated the majority of the race, leading a race-high 104 laps, before falling back to finish 3rd. Huddleston passed Reif for the lead with under 50 laps to go, and led 43 laps before finishing 2nd in a wild finish with Raz.

== Report ==
=== Background ===
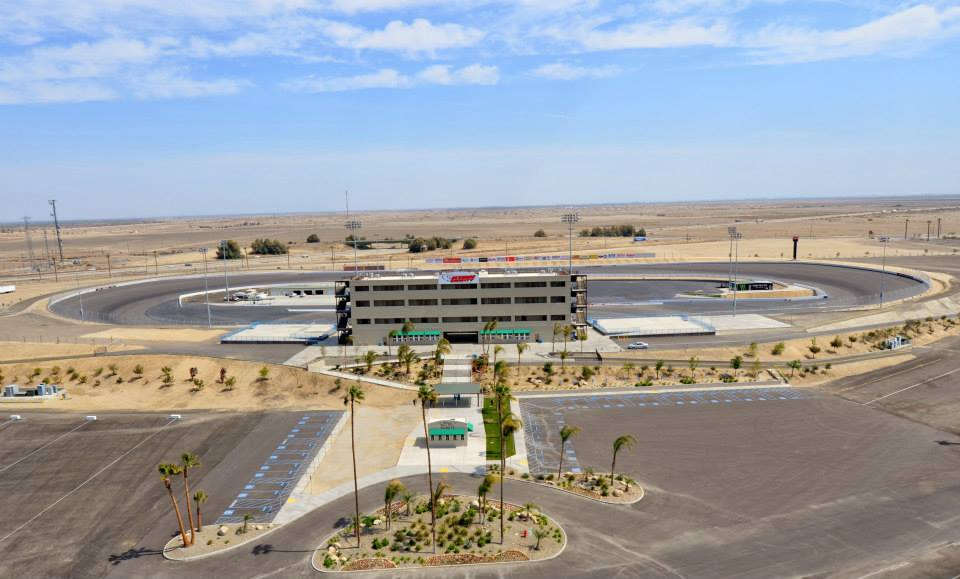
Kevin Harvick's Kern Raceway, the circuit where the race will be held.

Kevin Harvick's Kern Raceway (formerly Kern County Raceway Park) is a 0.5-mile (0.80 km) oval speedway located on CA 43 (Enos Lane) just off Interstate 5 in Bakersfield, Kern County, California, United States. Opened in 2013, it was built as a replacement for Mesa Marin Raceway.

Kevin Harvick's Kern Raceway hosts events with NASCAR's Whelen All-American Series along with an ARCA Menards Series West race since 2013.

The track has banks of 8° in the straightaways, with 14° paved corners. The track has 15,000 seats for fans, and room to expand to 17,000 seats for various events. It also contains 21 suites in the grandstand along with 18 concession stands.

==== Entry list ====
- (R) denotes rookie driver.

#	Driver	Team	Make	Sponsor
0	Tony Huffman	Fierce Creature Racing	Chevrolet	Camping World / First Impression Press
1	Robbie Kennealy (R)	Kennealy Keller Motorsports	Ford	Setting The Stage / Wiley X
3	Todd Souza	Central Coast Racing	Toyota	Central Coast Cabinets
4	Eric Nascimento	Nascimento Motorsports	Chevrolet	RJs Paintshop / Impact Transport
05	David Smith	Shockwave Motorsports	Toyota	Shockwave Marine Suspension Seating
5	Kole Raz	Jerry Pitts Racing	Toyota	Apache Rental Group
7	Takuma Koga	Jerry Pitts Racing	Toyota	GR Garage
11	Danica Dart (R)	Kennealy Keller Motorsports	Ford	Evers Farms / Pioneer Performance
12	Kyle Keller	Kennealy Keller Motorsports	Ford	Setting The Stage / Battle Born
13	Tyler Reif	Central Coast Racing	Toyota	Central Coast Cabinets
16	Jack Wood	Bill McAnally Racing	Chevrolet	NAPA Auto Care
19	Eric Johnson Jr. (R)	Bill McAnally Racing	Chevrolet	Pacific Office Automation
21	Henry Barton	Nascimento Motorsports	Toyota	Nascimento Motorsports / Turn One
23	Mason Mitchell	Sigma Performance Services	Chevrolet	SPS / GMS Fabrication
24	Sean Hingorani (Note: Joe Farré, the original driver of the No. 24, would give up his ride and allowed Sean Hingorani to drive the car, after the No. 61 of Hattori Racing Enterprises withdrew from the race. It was reported that Hingorani and HRE had parted ways prior to the race.)	Sigma Performance Services	Chevrolet	SPS / Fisher Industries
27	Bobby Hillis Jr.	Fierce Creature Racing	Chevrolet	Camping World / First Impression Press
33	P. J. Pedroncelli	Rodd Racing	Chevrolet	Pedroncelli Mobile Bottling
41	Johnny Borneman III	Lowden Jackson Motorsports	Ford	Tilly's / Stoney's
50	Trevor Huddleston	High Point Racing	Ford	High Point Racing / Racecar Factory
52	Ryan Philpott	Philpott Race Cars	Chevrolet	Hacienda Pools / Mattos Transport
71	Nick Joanides	Jan's Towing Racing	Ford	Jan's Towing
77	Cody Kiemele	Performance P–1 Motorsports	Toyota	King Taco / Master K BBQ / Wallace Sign
88	John Moore	Naake Klauer Motorsports	Ford	JM Environmental
Official entry list

== Practice ==
The first and only practice session was held on Saturday, April 20, at 3:30 PM PST, and would last for 1 hour. Tyler Reif, driving for Central Coast Racing, would set the fastest time in the session, with a lap of 18.744, and a speed of 96.031 mph (154.547 km/h).

Pos.	#	Driver	Team	Make	Time	Speed
1	13	Tyler Reif	Central Coast Racing	Toyota	18.744	96.031
2	5	Kole Raz	Jerry Pitts Racing	Toyota	18.775	95.872
3	16	Jack Wood	Bill McAnally Racing	Chevrolet	18.821	95.638
Full practice results

== Qualifying ==
Qualifying was held on Saturday, April 20, at 5:00 PM PST. The qualifying system used is a multi-car, multi-lap based system. All drivers will be on track for a 20-minute timed session, and whoever sets the fastest time in the session will win the pole.

Tyler Reif, driving for Central Coast Racing, would score the pole for the race, with a lap of 18.464, and a speed of 97.487 mph (156.890 km/h).

=== Qualifying results ===
Pos.	#	Driver	Team	Make	Time	Speed
1	13	Tyler Reif	Central Coast Racing	Toyota	18.464	97.487
2	16	Jack Wood	Bill McAnally Racing	Chevrolet	18.646	96.535
3	5	Kole Raz	Jerry Pitts Racing	Toyota	18.647	96.530
4	50	Trevor Huddleston	High Point Racing	Ford	18.737	96.067
5	71	Nick Joanides	Jan's Towing Racing	Ford	18.744	96.031
6	24	Sean Hingorani	Sigma Performance Services	Chevrolet	18.758	95.959
7	4	Eric Nascimento	Nascimento Motorsports	Chevrolet	18.818	95.653
8	23	Mason Mitchell	Sigma Performance Services	Chevrolet	18.858	95.450
9	33	P. J. Pedroncelli	Rodd Racing	Chevrolet	18.937	95.052
10	12	Kyle Keller	Kennealy Keller Motorsports	Ford	18.981	94.832
11	3	Todd Souza	Central Coast Racing	Toyota	18.993	94.772
12	7	Takuma Koga	Jerry Pitts Racing	Toyota	19.016	94.657
13	41	Johnny Borneman III	Lowden Jackson Motorsports	Ford	19.023	94.622
14	21	Henry Barton	Nascimento Motorsports	Toyota	19.094	94.270
15	88	John Moore	Naake Klauer Motorsports	Ford	19.146	94.014
16	19	Eric Johnson Jr. (R)	Bill McAnally Racing	Chevrolet	19.210	93.701
17	52	Ryan Philpott	Philpott Race Cars	Chevrolet	19.445	92.569
18	11	Danica Dart (R)	Kennealy Keller Motorsports	Ford	19.651	91.598
19	77	Cody Kiemele	Performance P–1 Motorsports	Toyota	19.676	91.482
20	1	Robbie Kennealy (R)	Kennealy Keller Motorsports	Ford	20.534	87.659
21	27	Bobby Hillis Jr.	Fierce Creature Racing	Chevrolet	20.796	86.555
22	05	David Smith	Shockwave Motorsports	Toyota	26.986	66.701
23	0	Tony Huffman	Fierce Creature Racing	Chevrolet	–	–
Withdrew
	61	Sean Hingorani	Hattori Racing Enterprises	Toyota		
Official qualifying results

== Race results ==
Fin	St	#	Driver	Team	Make	Laps	Led	Status	Pts
1	3	5	Kole Raz	Jerry Pitts Racing	Toyota	150	3	Running	47
2	4	50	Trevor Huddleston	High Point Racing	Ford	150	43	Running	43
3	1	13	Tyler Reif	Central Coast Racing	Toyota	150	104	Running	44
4	6	24	Sean Hingorani	Sigma Performance Services	Chevrolet	150	0	Running	40
5	5	71	Nick Joanides	Jan's Towing Racing	Ford	150	0	Running	39
6	7	4	Eric Nascimento	Nascimento Motorsports	Chevrolet	150	0	Running	38
7	10	12	Kyle Keller	Kennealy Keller Motorsports	Ford	150	0	Running	37
8	9	33	P. J. Pedroncelli	Rodd Racing	Chevrolet	149	0	Running	36
9	11	3	Todd Souza	Central Coast Racing	Toyota	149	0	Running	35
10	16	19	Eric Johnson Jr. (R)	Bill McAnally Racing	Chevrolet	149	0	Running	34
11	13	41	Johnny Borneman III	Lowden Jackson Motorsports	Ford	147	0	Running	33
12	2	16	Jack Wood	Bill McAnally Racing	Chevrolet	146	0	Running	32
13	15	88	John Moore	Naake Klauer Motorsports	Ford	146	0	Running	31
14	17	52	Ryan Philpott	Philpott Race Cars	Chevrolet	146	0	Running	30
15	12	7	Takuma Koga	Jerry Pitts Racing	Toyota	145	0	Running	29
16	22	05	David Smith	Shockwave Motorsports	Toyota	138	0	Running	28
17	21	27	Bobby Hillis Jr.	Fierce Creature Racing	Chevrolet	137	0	Running	27
18	8	23	Mason Mitchell	Sigma Performance Services	Chevrolet	58	0	Overheating	26
19	19	77	Cody Kiemele	Performance P–1 Motorsports	Toyota	36	0	Accident	25
20	14	21	Henry Barton	Nascimento Motorsports	Toyota	2	0	Vibration	24
21	23	0	Tony Huffman	Fierce Creature Racing	Chevrolet	0	0	DNS	23
22	18	11	Danica Dart (R)	Kennealy Keller Motorsports	Ford	0	0	DNS	22
23	20	1	Robbie Kennealy (R)	Kennealy Keller Motorsports	Ford	0	0	DNS	21
Withdrew
		61	Sean Hingorani	Hattori Racing Enterprises	Toyota				
Official race results

== Standings after the race ==
Drivers' Championship standings

	Pos	Driver	Points
4	1	Sean Hingorani	79
9	2	Tyler Reif	76 (-3)
14	3	Trevor Huddleston	70 (–9)
3	4	Jack Wood	70 (–9)
13	5	Kyle Keller	63 (–16)
13	6	Todd Souza	60 (–19)
13	7	Eric Johnson Jr.	58 (–21)
18	8	Nick Joanides	57 (–22)
14	9	Takuma Koga	50 (–29)
9	10	William Sawalich	48 (–31)

- Note: Only the first 10 positions are included for the driver standings.

Previous race: 2024 General Tire 150 (Phoenix)	ARCA Menards Series West; 2024 season	Next race: 2024 Portland 112
