= 2023 Portland 112 =

4th race of the 2023 ARCA Menards Series West

Race details
- Race 4 of 12 of the 2023 ARCA Menards Series West
- Date: June 2, 2023
- Official name: 3rd Annual Portland 112
- Location: Portland International Raceway in Portland, Oregon
- Course: Permanent racing facility
- Course length: 1.967 miles (3.166 km)
- Distance: 57 laps, 112 mi (181 km)
- Scheduled distance: 57 laps, 112 mi (181 km)
- Average speed: 62.743 mph (100.975 km/h)

Pole position
Driver	Landen Lewis	McGowan Motorsports
- Time: 1:16.795

Most laps led
Driver	Cole Custer	High Point Racing
- Laps: 22

Winner
No. 17	Landen Lewis	McGowan Motorsports

Television in the United States
- Network: FloRacing
- Announcers: Charles Krall

Radio in the United States
- Radio: ARCA Racing Network

The 2023 Portland 112 was the 4th stock car race of the 2023 ARCA Menards Series West season, and the 3rd running of the event. The race was on Friday, June 2, 2023, at Portland International Raceway in Portland, Oregon, a 1.967 mile (3.166 km) permanent asphalt road course. The race took the scheduled 57 laps to complete. In a wild race, Landen Lewis, driving for McGowan Motorsports, would break his 2nd-place streak and hold off a challenging Cole Custer on the final restart to earn his second career ARCA Menards Series West win, and his first of the season. Lewis won the pole and led 18 laps of the race, while Custer led a race-high 22 laps and finished 2nd. To fill out the podium, Dale Quarterley, driving for his own team, 1/4 Ley Racing, would finish in 3rd, respectively.

== Report ==
=== Background ===
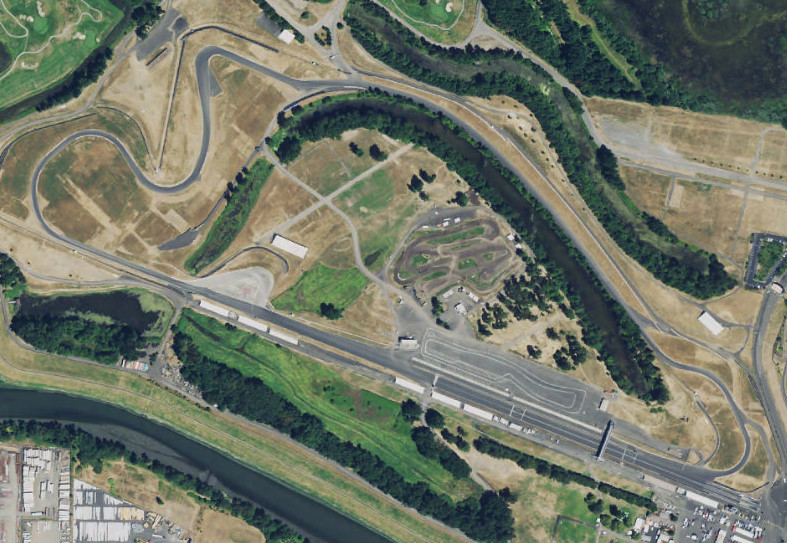
Portland International Raceway, the circuit where the race will be held.

Portland International Raceway (PIR) is a motorsport facility in Portland in the U.S. state of Oregon. It is part of the Delta Park complex on the former site of Vanport, just south of the Columbia River. It lies west of the Delta Park/Vanport light rail station and less than a mile west of Interstate 5.

The track hosts the IndyCar Series, Formula E, ICSCC and SCCA and OMRRA road racing, the ARCA Menards Series West, the NASCAR Xfinity Series, and SCCA autocross events. Additionally, the PIR grounds are host to OBRA (Oregon Bicycle Racing Association) bicycling races on the track and the surrounding grounds. The facility includes a dragstrip and a motocross track.

==== Entry list ====
- (R) denotes rookie driver.

#	Driver	Team	Make	Sponsor
02	Parker Retzlaff	Young's Motorsports	Chevrolet	Ponsse / Pewag group
04	Ethan Nascicmento (R)	Nascimento Motorsports	Toyota	RAILBAR Protein Bar
4	Eric Nascimento	Nascimento Motorsports	Toyota	Phillips Brothers Fabrication / Impact Transportation
05	David Smith (R)	Shockwave Motorsports	Toyota	Shockwave Marine Suspension Seating
5	Riley Herbst	Jerry Pitts Racing	Ford	Jerry Pitts Racing
7	Takuma Koga	Jerry Pitts Racing	Toyota	Loop Connect
13	Todd Souza	Central Coast Racing	Ford	Central Coast Cabinets
14	Davey Magras	Davey Magras Racing	Chevrolet	Advanced Autoworks / Koerner Racing Engines
15	Sean Hingorani (R)	Venturini Motorsports	Toyota	Mobil 1
16	Tanner Reif	Bill McAnally Racing	Chevrolet	NAPA Auto Care
17	Landen Lewis	McGowan Motorsports	Chevrolet	Rentsource / American Resurfacing Inc.
18	William Sawalich	Joe Gibbs Racing	Toyota	Starkey / SoundGear
19	Eric Johnson Jr.	Bill McAnally Racing	Chevrolet	Pacific Office Automation
24	Dylan Lupton	Bill McAnally Racing	Chevrolet	Lupton Excavation
32	Dale Quarterley	1/4 Ley Racing	Chevrolet	Van Dyk Recycling Solutions / Motul
39	Roxali Kamper	Last Chance Racing	Chevrolet	Skin N' Tox Aesthetics
41	Tyler Reif (R)	Lowden Jackson Motorsports	Ford	Nevada Tourism / Stoney's
46	Kyle Sieg	Lowden Jackson Motorsports	Ford	Country AF Radio / Stoney's
50	Trevor Huddleston	High Point Racing	Ford	High Point Racing / Racecar Factory
52	Ryan Philpott	Philpott Race Cars	Toyota	Mattos Rentals / Hacienda Pools
55	Cole Custer	High Point Racing	Ford	Pristine Auction
70	Kyle Keller	Jerry Pitts Racing	Chevrolet	KISMIF Foundation / Blaster SwissLube
88	Bradley Erickson (R)	Naake-Klauer Motorsports	Ford	L&S Framing
99	Caleb Shrader	Bill McAnally Racing	Chevrolet	Consonus Healthcare
Official entry list

== Practice ==
The first and only practice session was held on Friday, June 2, at 11:35 AM PST, and would last for 1 hour. Todd Souza, driving for his own team, Central Coast Racing, would set the fastest time in the session, with a lap of 1:12.746, and a speed of 97.490 mph (156.895 km/h).

Pos.	#	Driver	Team	Make	Time	Speed
1	13	Todd Souza	Central Coast Racing	Ford	1:12.746	97.490
2	15	Sean Hingorani (R)	Venturini Motorsports	Toyota	1:17.704	91.269
3	55	Cole Custer	High Point Racing	Ford	1:17.782	91.178
Full practice results

== Qualifying ==
Qualifying was held on Friday, June 2, at 3:10 PM PST. The qualifying system used is a multi-car, multi-lap based system. All drivers will be on track for a 20-minute timed session, and whoever sets the fastest time in the session will win the pole.

Landen Lewis, driving for McGowan Motorsports, would score the pole for the race, with a lap of 1:16.795, and a speed of 92.350 mph (148.623 km/h).

=== Qualifying results ===
Pos.	#	Driver	Team	Make	Time	Speed
1	17	Landen Lewis	McGowan Motorsports	Chevrolet	1:16.795	92.350
2	15	Sean Hingorani (R)	Venturini Motorsports	Toyota	1:16.849	92.285
3	55	Cole Custer	High Point Racing	Ford	1:17.300	91.746
4	18	William Sawalich	Joe Gibbs Racing	Toyota	1:17.780	91.180
5	02	Parker Retzlaff	Young's Motorsports	Chevrolet	1:18.218	90.670
6	5	Riley Herbst	Jerry Pitts Racing	Ford	1:18.243	90.641
7	50	Trevor Huddleston	High Point Racing	Ford	1:18.571	90.262
8	41	Tyler Reif (R)	Lowden Jackson Motorsports	Ford	1:18.799	90.001
9	99	Caleb Shrader	Bill McAnally Racing	Chevrolet	1:18.844	89.950
10	19	Eric Johnson Jr.	Bill McAnally Racing	Chevrolet	1:18.911	89.873
11	13	Todd Souza	Central Coast Racing	Ford	1:18.942	89.838
12	16	Tanner Reif	Bill McAnally Racing	Chevrolet	1:18.977	89.798
13	88	Bradley Erickson (R)	Naake-Klauer Motorsports	Ford	1:19.108	89.650
14	32	Dale Quarterley	1/4 Ley Racing	Chevrolet	1:19.212	89.532
15	24	Dylan Lupton	Bill McAnally Racing	Chevrolet	1:20.235	88.390
16	52	Ryan Philpott	Philpott Race Cars	Toyota	1:22.010	86.477
17	70	Kyle Keller	Jerry Pitts Racing	Chevrolet	1:22.024	86.462
18	7	Takuma Koga	Jerry Pitts Racing	Toyota	1:22.668	85.789
19	14	Davey Magras	Davey Magras Racing	Chevrolet	1:23.596	84.837
20	05	David Smith (R)	Shockwave Motorsports	Toyota	1:26.294	82.184
21	4	Eric Nascimento	Nascimento Motorsports	Toyota	–	–
22	04	Ethan Nascimento (R)	Nascimento Motorsports	Toyota	–	–
23	46	Kyle Sieg	Lowden Jackson Motorsports	Ford	–	–
24	39	Roxali Kamper	Last Chance Racing	Chevrolet	–	–
Official qualifying results

== Race results ==
Fin	St	#	Driver	Team	Make	Laps	Led	Status	Pts
1	1	17	Landen Lewis	McGowan Motorsports	Chevrolet	57	18	Running	48
2	3	55	Cole Custer	High Point Racing	Ford	57	22	Running	44
3	14	32	Dale Quarterley	1/4 Ley Racing	Chevrolet	57	0	Running	41
4	4	18	William Sawalich	Joe Gibbs Racing	Toyota	57	0	Running	40
5	5	02	Parker Retzlaff	Young's Motorsports	Chevrolet	57	0	Running	39
6	13	88	Bradley Erickson (R)	Naake-Klauer Motorsports	Ford	57	0	Running	38
7	9	99	Caleb Shrader	Bill McAnally Racing	Chevrolet	57	0	Running	37
8	18	7	Takuma Koga	Jerry Pitts Racing	Toyota	57	0	Running	36
9	19	14	Davey Magras	Davey Magras Racing	Chevrolet	57	0	Running	35
10	10	19	Eric Johnson Jr.	Bill McAnally Racing	Chevrolet	57	0	Running	34
11	2	15	Sean Hingorani (R)	Venturini Motorsports	Toyota	57	0	Running	33
13	7	50	Trevor Huddleston	High Point Racing	Ford	57	0	Running	32
12	20	05	David Smith (R)	Shockwave Motorsports	Toyota	56	0	Running	31
14	12	16	Tanner Reif	Bill McAnally Racing	Chevrolet	53	0	Running	30
15	8	41	Tyler Reif (R)	Lowden Jackson Motorsports	Ford	49	0	Shocks	29
16	21	4	Eric Nascimento	Nascimento Motorsports	Toyota	48	0	Oil Leak	28
17	23	46	Kyle Sieg	Lowden Jackson Motorsports	Ford	44	0	Engine	27
18	6	5	Riley Herbst	Jerry Pitts Racing	Ford	43	17	Rear End	27
19	16	52	Ryan Philpott	Philpott Race Cars	Toyota	28	0	Engine	25
20	17	70	Kyle Keller	Jerry Pitts Racing	Chevrolet	14	0	Engine	24
21	15	24	Dylan Lupton	Bill McAnally Racing	Chevrolet	8	0	Fire	23
22	11	13	Todd Souza	Central Coast Racing	Ford	7	0	Accident	22
23	22	04	Ethan Nascimento (R)	Nascimento Motorsports	Toyota	0	0	DNS	21
24	24	39	Roxali Kamper	Last Chance Racing	Chevrolet	0	0	DNS	20
Official race results

== Standings after the race ==
Drivers' Championship standings

	Pos	Driver	Points
	1	Landen Lewis	169
1	2	Sean Hingorani	157 (-12)
1	3	Tyler Reif	155 (–14)
1	4	Bradley Erickson	155 (–14)
1	5	Trevor Huddleston	151 (–18)
	6	Tanner Reif	141 (–28)
	7	Kyle Keller	131 (–38)
1	8	Takuma Koga	130 (–39)
1	9	Todd Souza	123 (–46)
	10	David Smith	123 (–46)

- Note: Only the first 10 positions are included for the driver standings.

Previous race: 2023 NAPA Auto Parts BlueDEF 150 (Kern County)	ARCA Menards Series West; 2023 season	Next race: 2023 General Tire 200
