= 2023 NAPA Auto Parts BlueDEF 150 (Kern County) =

3rd race of the 2023 ARCA Menards Series West

Race details
- Race 3 of 12 of the 2023 ARCA Menards Series West
- Date: April 22, 2023
- Official name: 9th Annual NAPA Auto Parts BlueDEF 150
- Location: Kern County Raceway Park in Bakersfield, California
- Course: Permanent racing facility
- Course length: 0.50 miles (0.80 km)
- Distance: 150 laps, 75 mi (120 km)
- Scheduled distance: 150 laps, 75 mi (120 km)
- Average speed: 74.958 mph (120.633 km/h)

Pole position
| Driver | Landen Lewis | McGowan Motorsports |
- Time: 18.622

Most laps led
| Driver | Landen Lewis | McGowan Motorsports |
- Laps: 111

Winner
| No. 15 | Sean Hingorani | Venturini Motorsports |

Television in the United States
- Network: FloRacing
- Announcers: Charles Krall

Radio in the United States
- Radio: ARCA Racing Network

The 2023 NAPA Auto Parts BlueDEF 150 was the 3rd stock car race of the 2023 ARCA Menards Series West season, and the 9th running of the event. The race was held on Saturday, April 22, 2023, at Kern County Raceway Park in Bakersfield, California, a 0.50 mile (0.80 km) permanent asphalt tri-oval shaped short track. The race took the scheduled 150 laps to complete. Sean Hingorani, driving for Venturini Motorsports, would overcome from a late-race penalty, and took the lead from the dominating Landen Lewis, leading the final 39 laps to earn his second career ARCA Menards Series West win, and his second consecutive win. Pole-sitter Landen Lewis dominated nearly the entire race, leading a race-high 111 laps before being passed by Hingorani and finishing 2nd. To fill out the podium, Trevor Huddleston, driving for High Point Racing, would finish in 3rd, respectively.

== Report ==
=== Background ===
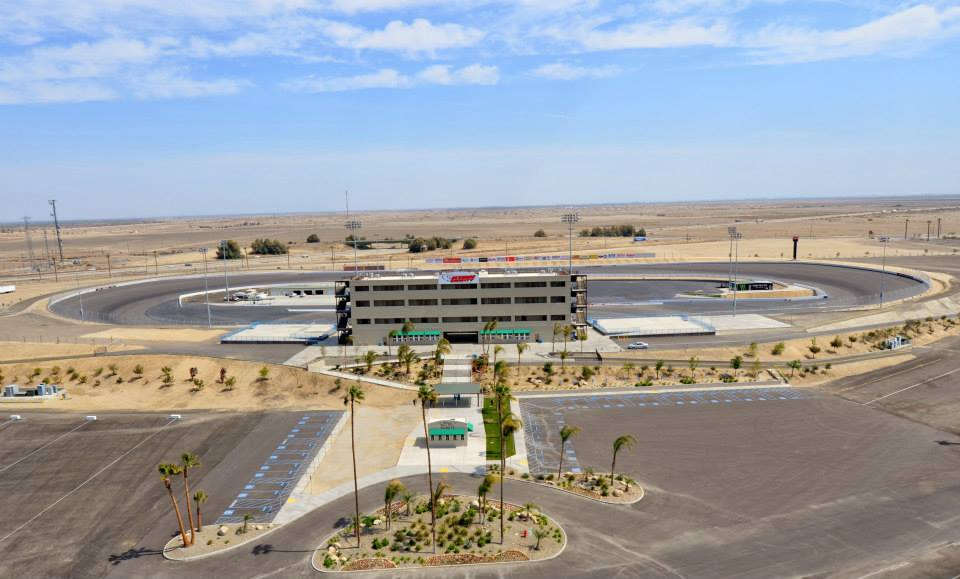
Kern County Raceway Park, the circuit where the race was held.

Kern County Raceway Park is a 0.5-mile (0.80 km) oval speedway located on CA 43 (Enos Lane) just off Interstate 5 in Bakersfield, Kern County, California, United States. Opened in 2013, it was built as a replacement for Mesa Marin Raceway.

Kern County Raceway Park hosts events with NASCAR's Whelen All-American Series along with an ARCA Menards Series West race since 2013.

The track has banks of 8° in the straightaways, with 14° paved corners. The track has 15,000 seats for fans, and room to expand to 17,000 seats for various events. It also contains 21 suites in the grandstand along with 18 concession stands.

==== Entry list ====
- (R) denotes rookie driver.

| # | Driver | Team | Make | Sponsor |
|---|---|---|---|---|
| 04 | Ethan Nascimento (R) | Nascimento Motorsports | Toyota | RAILBAR Protein Bar |
| 4 | Eric Nascimento | Nascimento Motorsports | Chevrolet | Fidelity Capital / RJs Paintshop |
| 05 | David Smith (R) | Shockwave Motorsports | Toyota | Shockwave Marine Suspension Seating |
| 7 | Takuma Koga | Jerry Pitts Racing | Toyota | Yamada |
| 13 | Todd Souza | Central Coast Racing | Ford | Central Coast Cabinets |
| 15 | Sean Hingorani (R) | Venturini Motorsports | Toyota | Mobil 1 |
| 16 | Tanner Reif | Bill McAnally Racing | Chevrolet | NAPA Auto Care |
| 17 | Landen Lewis | McGowan Motorsports | Chevrolet | American Resurfacing Inc. / MMI |
| 27 | Bobby Hillis Jr. | Fierce Creature Racing | Chevrolet | Camping World / First Impression Press |
| 41 | Tyler Reif (R) | Lowden Jackson Motorsports | Ford | Power Gen Components / Stoney's |
| 46 | R. J. Smotherman (R) | Lowden Jackson Motorsports | Ford | Country AF Radio / Stoney's |
| 50 | Trevor Huddleston | High Point Racing | Ford | High Point Racing / Racecar Factory |
| 55 | Jake Bollman | High Point Racing | Ford | High Point Racing / Racecar Factory |
| 70 | Kyle Keller | Jerry Pitts Racing | Toyota | EverReady Health / Star Nursery |
| 77 | Nick Joanides | Performance P–1 Motorsports | Ford | Jan's Towing / King Taco |
| 88 | Bradley Erickson (R) | Naake-Klauer Motorsports | Ford | L&S Framing |
Official entry list

== Practice ==
The first and only practice session was held on Saturday, April 22, at 3:00 p.m. PST, and would last for 1 hour. Landen Lewis, driving for McGowan Motorsports, would set the fastest time in the session, with a lap of 19.046, and a speed of 94.508 mph (152.096 km/h).

| Pos. | # | Driver | Team | Make | Time | Speed |
|---|---|---|---|---|---|---|
| 1 | 17 | Landen Lewis | McGowan Motorsports | Chevrolet | 19.046 | 94.508 |
| 2 | 15 | Sean Hingorani (R) | Venturini Motorsports | Toyota | 19.094 | 94.270 |
| 3 | 50 | Trevor Huddleston | High Point Racing | Ford | 19.107 | 94.206 |
Full practice results

== Qualifying ==
Qualifying was held on Saturday, April 22, at 4:40 p.m. PST. The qualifying system used is a multi-car, multi-lap based system. All drivers will be on track for a 20-minute timed session, and whoever sets the fastest time in the session will win the pole.

Landen Lewis, driving for McGowan Motorsports, would score the pole for the race, with a lap of 18.622, and a speed of 96.660 mph (155.559 km/h).

=== Qualifying results ===
| Pos. | # | Driver | Team | Make | Time | Speed |
|---|---|---|---|---|---|---|
| 1 | 17 | Landen Lewis | McGowan Motorsports | Chevrolet | 18.622 | 96.660 |
| 2 | 15 | Sean Hingorani (R) | Venturini Motorsports | Toyota | 18.711 | 96.200 |
| 3 | 16 | Tanner Reif | Bill McAnally Racing | Chevrolet | 18.778 | 95.857 |
| 4 | 13 | Todd Souza | Central Coast Racing | Ford | 18.793 | 95.780 |
| 5 | 50 | Trevor Huddleston | High Point Racing | Ford | 18.923 | 95.122 |
| 6 | 41 | Tyler Reif (R) | Lowden Jackson Motorsports | Ford | 18.923 | 95.122 |
| 7 | 4 | Eric Nascimento | Nascimento Motorsports | Chevrolet | 18.994 | 94.767 |
| 8 | 88 | Bradley Erickson (R) | Naake-Klauer Motorsports | Ford | 19.014 | 94.667 |
| 9 | 04 | Ethan Nascimento (R) | Nascimento Motorsports | Toyota | 19.017 | 94.652 |
| 10 | 46 | R. J. Smotherman (R) | Lowden Jackson Motorsports | Ford | 19.043 | 94.523 |
| 11 | 55 | Jake Bollman | High Point Racing | Ford | 19.068 | 94.399 |
| 12 | 7 | Takuma Koga | Jerry Pitts Racing | Toyota | 19.116 | 94.162 |
| 13 | 70 | Kyle Keller | Jerry Pitts Racing | Toyota | 19.258 | 93.468 |
| 14 | 05 | David Smith (R) | Shockwave Motorsports | Toyota | 19.411 | 92.731 |
| 15 | 77 | Nick Joanides | Performance P–1 Motorsports | Ford | 19.472 | 92.440 |
| 16 | 27 | Bobby Hillis Jr. | Fierce Creature Racing | Chevrolet | 20.305 | 88.648 |
Official qualifying results

== Race results ==
| Fin | St | # | Driver | Team | Make | Laps | Led | Status | Pts |
|---|---|---|---|---|---|---|---|---|---|
| 1 | 2 | 15 | Sean Hingorani (R) | Venturini Motorsports | Toyota | 150 | 39 | Running | 47 |
| 2 | 1 | 17 | Landen Lewis | McGowan Motorsports | Chevrolet | 150 | 111 | Running | 45 |
| 3 | 5 | 50 | Trevor Huddleston | High Point Racing | Ford | 150 | 0 | Running | 41 |
| 4 | 3 | 16 | Tanner Reif | Bill McAnally Racing | Chevrolet | 150 | 0 | Running | 40 |
| 5 | 8 | 88 | Bradley Erickson (R) | Naake-Klauer Motorsports | Ford | 150 | 0 | Running | 39 |
| 6 | 6 | 41 | Tyler Reif (R) | Lowden Jackson Motorsports | Ford | 150 | 0 | Running | 38 |
| 7 | 11 | 55 | Jake Bollman | High Point Racing | Ford | 150 | 0 | Running | 37 |
| 8 | 7 | 04 | Ethan Nascimento (R) | Nascimento Motorsports | Toyota | 150 | 0 | Running | 36 |
| 9 | 4 | 13 | Todd Souza | Central Coast Racing | Ford | 149 | 0 | Running | 35 |
| 10 | 15 | 77 | Nick Joanides | Performance P–1 Motorsports | Ford | 148 | 0 | Running | 34 |
| 11 | 12 | 7 | Takuma Koga | Jerry Pitts Racing | Toyota | 147 | 0 | Running | 33 |
| 12 | 16 | 27 | Bobby Hillis Jr. | Fierce Creature Racing | Chevrolet | 143 | 0 | Running | 32 |
| 13 | 14 | 05 | David Smith (R) | Shockwave Motorsports | Toyota | 133 | 0 | Accident | 31 |
| 14 | 13 | 70 | Kyle Keller | Jerry Pitts Racing | Toyota | 92 | 0 | Engine | 30 |
| 15 | 9 | 4 | Eric Nascimento | Nascimento Motorsports | Chevrolet | 72 | 0 | Electrical | 29 |
| 16 | 10 | 46 | R. J. Smotherman (R) | Lowden Jackson Motorsports | Ford | 8 | 0 | Gear | 28 |
Official race results

== Standings after the race ==
Drivers' Championship standings

| | Pos | Driver | Points |
|---|---|---|---|
| 1 | 1 | Landen Lewis | 131 |
| 1 | 2 | Tyler Reif | 126 (-5) |
| 3 | 3 | Sean Hingorani | 122 (–9) |
| 1 | 4 | Trevor Huddleston | 118 (–13) |
| | 5 | Bradley Erickson | 115 (–16) |
| 1 | 6 | Tanner Reif | 111 (–20) |
| 3 | 7 | Kyle Keller | 107 (–24) |
| | 8 | Todd Souza | 101 (–30) |
| | 9 | Takuma Koga | 95 (–36) |
| | 10 | David Smith | 92 (–39) |

- Note: Only the first 10 positions are included for the driver standings.

| Previous race: 2023 West Coast Stock Car Motorsports Hall of Fame 150 | ARCA Menards Series West; 2023 season | Next race: 2023 Portland 112 |
