= 2023 NAPA Auto Parts BlueDEF 150 (Irwindale) =

2023 NAPA Auto Parts 150 BlueDEF presented by the West Coast Stock Car Hall of Fame
Race details
- Race 6 of 12 in the 2023 ARCA Menards Series West season
- Date: July 1, 2023
- Location: Irwindale Speedway in Irwindale, California
- Course: Permanent racing facility
- Course length: 0.50 miles (0.80 km)
- Distance: 150 laps, 75.50 mi (123.165 km)
- Average speed: 85.066

Pole position
Driver	Sean Hingorani	Venturini Motorsports
- Time: 18.383

Most laps led
Driver	Trevor Huddleston	High Point Racing
- Laps: 63

Winner
No. 50	Trevor Huddleston	High Point Racing

The 2023 NAPA Auto Parts 150 was an ARCA Menards Series West race that was held on July 1, 2023, at the Irwindale Speedway in Irwindale, California. It was contested over 150 laps on the 0.50-mile (0.80 km) oval. It was the sixth race of the 2023 ARCA Menards Series West season. Trevor Huddleston came out victorious, for his 3rd career victory.

== Qualifying ==
=== Starting Lineups ===
Pos	No	Driver	Team	Manufacturer	Time	Speed
1	15	Sean Hingorani	Venturini Motorsports	Toyota	18.383	97.917
2	88	Bradley Erickson	Pedroncelli Motorsports	Ford	18.493	97.334
3	17	Landen Lewis	Bill McAnally Racing	Chevrolet	18.499	97.303
4	50	Trevor Huddleston	Huddleston Racing	Ford	18.55	97.035
5	16	Tanner Reif	Sunrise Ford Racing	Ford	18.561	96.978
6	21	Ethan Nascimento	Nascimento Motorsports	Toyota	18.565	96.957
7	13	Todd Souza	Central Coast Racing	Ford	18.57	96.931
8	4	Eric Nascimento	Phoenix Racing	Chevrolet	18.614	96.701
9	12	Tyler Reif	Jerry Pitts Racing	Ford	18.652	96.504
10	55	Jake Bollman	High Point Racing	Ford	18.659	96.468
11	77	Nick Joanides	Naake-Klauer Motorsports	Toyota	18.679	96.365
12	70	Kyle Keller	Bill McAnally Racing	Ford	18.689	96.313
13	1	Robbie Kennealy	Cook-Finley Racing	Ford	18.962	94.927
14	7	Takuma Koga	Jerry Pitts Racing	Toyota	18.975	94.862
15	5	David Smith	Steve McGowan Motorsports	Toyota	19.429	92.645
Official qualifying results

== Race results ==
Pos	No	Driver	Team	Manufacturer	Laps	Points	Status
1	50	Trevor Huddleston	Huddleston Racing	Ford	150	48	Running
2	4	Eric Nascimento	Sunrise Ford Racing	Chevrolet	150	42	Running
3	16	Tanner Reif	Bill McAnally Racing	Chevrolet	150	41	Running
4	13	Todd Souza	Bill McAnally Racing	Ford	150	40	Running
5	1	Robbie Kennealy	Phoenix Racing	Ford	150	39	Running
6	41	Tyler Reif	Sunrise Ford Racing	Ford	150	38	Running
7	55	Jake Bollman	Nascimento Motorsports	Ford	150	37	Running
8	77	Nick Joanides	Naake-Klauer Motorsports	Ford	150	36	Running
9	17	Landen Lewis	McGowan Motorsports	Chevrolet	150	35	Running
10	7	Takuma Koga	Jerry Pitts Racing	Toyota	147	34	Running
11	05	David Smith	Lowden Motorsports	Toyota	115	33	Rear End
12	15	Sean Hingorani	Venturini Motorsports	Toyota	90	32	Suspension
13	88	Bradley Erickson	Last Chance Racing	Ford	43	31	Overheating
14	21	Ethan Nascimento	66 Rhead Racing	Toyota	11	30	Fuel Pump
15	70	Kyle Keller	Jerry Pitts Racing	Ford	6	29	Sway Bar
Official race results

Previous race: 2023 General Tire 200 (Sonoma)	ARCA Menards Series West; 2023 season	Next race: 2023 Shasta 150
