= 2023 Desert Diamond Casino West Valley 100 =

12th race of the 2023 ARCA Menards Series West

Race details
- Race 12 of 12 of the 2023 ARCA Menards Series West
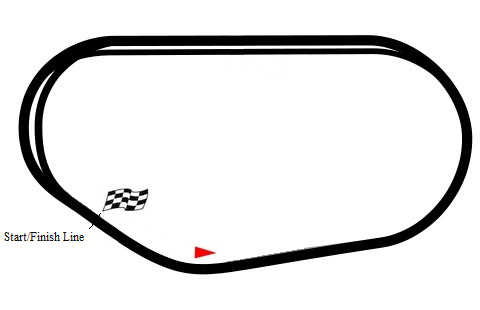
- Date: November 3, 2023
- Official name: 51st Annual Desert Diamond Casino West Valley 100
- Location: Phoenix Raceway, Avondale, Arizona
- Course: Permanent racing facility
- Course length: 1 miles (1.6 km)
- Distance: 100 laps, 100 mi (160 km)
- Scheduled distance: 100 laps, 100 mi (160 km)
- Average speed: 89.175 mph (143.513 km/h)

Pole position
Driver	William Sawalich	Joe Gibbs Racing
- Time: 27.096

Most laps led
Driver	William Sawalich	Joe Gibbs Racing
- Laps: 93

Winner
No. 18	William Sawalich	Joe Gibbs Racing

Television in the United States
- Network: CNBC (Tape Delayed until November 11); FloSports (Live Stream)
- Announcers: Charlie Krall and Phil Parsons

Radio in the United States
- Radio: MRN

The 2023 Desert Diamond Casino West Valley 100 was the 12th and final stock car race of the 2023 ARCA Menards Series West season, and the 51st iteration of the event. The race was held on Friday, November 3, 2023, in Avondale, Arizona at Phoenix Raceway, a 1-mile (1.6 km) permanent tri-oval shaped racetrack. The race took the scheduled 100 laps to complete. William Sawalich, driving for Joe Gibbs Racing, would put on a blistering performance, winning the pole and leading a race-high 93 laps, earning his first career ARCA Menards Series West win. To fill out the podium, Dean Thompson and Sean Hingorani, both driving for Venturini Motorsports, would finish 2nd and 3rd, respectively.

Despite finishing in third, Sean Hingorani would claim the 2023 ARCA Menards Series West championship. This was Hingorani's first championship, and the first championship for Venturini Motorsports in the West Series.

== Background ==
Phoenix Raceway – also known as PIR – is a one-mile, low-banked tri-oval race track located in Avondale, Arizona. It is named after the nearby metropolitan area of Phoenix. The motorsport track opened in 1964 and currently hosts two NASCAR race weekends annually. PIR has also hosted the IndyCar Series, CART, USAC and the Rolex Sports Car Series. The raceway is currently owned and operated by International Speedway Corporation.

The raceway was originally constructed with a 2.5 mi (4.0 km) road course that ran both inside and outside of the main tri-oval. In 1991 the track was reconfigured with the current 1.51 mi (2.43 km) interior layout. PIR has an estimated grandstand seating capacity of around 67,000. Lights were installed around the track in 2004 following the addition of a second annual NASCAR race weekend.

Phoenix Raceway is home to two annual NASCAR race weekends, one of 13 facilities on the NASCAR schedule to host more than one race weekend a year. The track is both the first and last stop in the western United States, as well as the fourth and the last track on the schedule.

=== Entry list ===
- (R) denotes rookie driver.

#	Driver	Team	Make	Sponsor
1	Jake Finch	Phoenix Racing	Toyota	Phoenix Construction
02	Mamba Smith	Young's Motorsports	Chevrolet	Flag Pole Buddy
2	Sebastian Arias	Rev Racing	Chevrolet	Rubbermaid
3	Todd Souza	Central Coast Racing	Ford	Central Coast Cabinets
4	Eric Nascimento	Nascimento Motorsports	Chevrolet	Impact Transportation, Nascimento Joiner
05	David Smith (R)	Shockwave Motorsports	Toyota	Shockwave Marine Suspension Seating
6	Lavar Scott	Rev Racing	Chevrolet	Max Siegel Inc.
7	Takuma Koga	Jerry Pitts Racing	Toyota	Loop Connect
11	Robbie Kennealy	3K Motorsports	Ford	Setting the Stage, American Swim Academy
12	Ryan Roulette	Fast Track Racing	Ford	VFW, Bellator Recruiting Academy
13	Tyler Reif (R)	Central Coast Racing	Toyota	Central Coast Cabinets
15	Sean Hingorani (R)	Venturini Motorsports	Toyota	Mobil 1
16	Tanner Reif	Bill McAnally Racing	Chevrolet	NAPA
17	Kaden Honeycutt	McGowan Motorsports	Toyota	MMI, Sunwest Construction
18	William Sawalich	Joe Gibbs Racing	Toyota	Starkey, SoundGear
20	Dean Thompson	Venturini Motorsports	Toyota	MCM Transportation
21	Ethan Nascimento (R)	Nascimento Motorsports	Chevrolet	Impact Transportation, Nascimento Joiner
23	Bradley Erickson (R)	Sigma Performance Services	Toyota	L&S Farming, Spencer Clark Foundation
25	Toni Breidinger	Venturini Motorsports	Toyota	Venturini Motorsports
27	Bobby Hillis Jr.	Fierce Creature Racing	Chevrolet	Camping World, First Impression Press
28	Jack Wood	Pinnacle Racing Group	Chevrolet	Chevrolet Performance
41	Johnny Borneman III	Lowden Jackson Motorsports	Ford	Tilley's
46	Justin Johnson	Lowden Jackson Motorsports	Ford	Tilley's
50	Trevor Huddleston	High Point Racing	Ford	High Point Racing, Racecar Factory
55	Kris Wright	Venturini Motorsports	Toyota	FNB Corporation
70	Kyle Keller	Jerry Pitts Racing	Ford	Argus Construction, Battle Born Racing
71	Nick Joanides	Joanides Motorsports	Ford	Jan's Towing
88	Joey Iest	Naake-Klauer Motorsports	Ford	Basila Farms, Richwood Meats
97	Landen Lewis	CR7 Motorsports	Chevrolet	American Resurfacing
Official entry list

== Practice ==
The first and only practice session was held on Thursday, November 2, at 6:00 PM MST, and would last for 60 minutes. William Sawalich, driving for Joe Gibbs Racing, would set the fastest time in the session, with a lap of 27.681, and an average speed of 130.053 mph (209.300 km/h).

Pos.	#	Driver	Team	Make	Time	Speed
1	18	William Sawalich	Joe Gibbs Racing	Toyota	27.681	130.053
2	15	Sean Hingorani (R)	Venturini Motorsports	Toyota	27.858	129.227
3	20	Dean Thompson	Venturini Motorsports	Toyota	27.908	128.995
Full practice results

== Qualifying ==
Qualifying was held on Thursday, November 2, at 7:10 PM MST. The qualifying system used is a single-car, single-lap system with only one round. Whoever sets the fastest time in that round will win the pole. William Sawalich, driving for Joe Gibbs Racing, would score the pole for the race, with a lap of 27.096, and an average speed of 132.861 mph (213.819 km/h).

Pos.	#	Driver	Team	Make	Time	Speed
1	18	William Sawalich	Joe Gibbs Racing	Toyota	27.096	132.861
2	15	Sean Hingorani (R)	Venturini Motorsports	Toyota	27.271	132.008
3	20	Dean Thompson	Venturini Motorsports	Toyota	27.336	131.694
4	17	Kaden Honeycutt	McGowan Motorsports	Toyota	27.368	131.540
5	28	Jack Wood	Pinnacle Racing Group	Chevrolet	27.410	131.339
6	16	Tanner Reif	Bill McAnally Racing	Chevrolet	27.433	131.229
7	97	Landen Lewis	CR7 Motorsports	Chevrolet	27.552	130.662
8	13	Tyler Reif (R)	Central Coast Racing	Toyota	27.554	130.653
9	6	Lavar Scott	Rev Racing	Chevrolet	27.622	130.331
10	23	Bradley Erickson (R)	Sigma Performance Services	Toyota	27.839	129.315
11	3	Todd Souza	Central Coast Racing	Ford	27.865	129.194
12	55	Kris Wright	Venturini Motorsports	Toyota	27.866	129.190
13	46	Justin Johnson	Lowden Jackson Motorsports	Ford	27.927	128.908
14	2	Sebastian Arias	Rev Racing	Chevrolet	27.984	128.645
15	4	Eric Nascimento	Nascimento Motorsports	Chevrolet	28.027	128.448
16	25	Toni Breidinger	Venturini Motorsports	Toyota	28.113	128.055
17	02	Mamba Smith	Young's Motorsports	Chevrolet	28.135	127.955
18	88	Joey Iest	Naake-Klauer Motorsports	Ford	28.271	127.339
19	41	Johnny Borneman III	Lowden Jackson Motorsports	Ford	28.289	127.258
20	70	Kyle Keller	Jerry Pitts Racing	Ford	28.406	126.734
21	50	Trevor Huddleston	High Point Racing	Ford	28.432	126.618
22	21	Ethan Nascimento (R)	Nascimento Motorsports	Chevrolet	28.627	125.755
23	71	Nick Joanides	Jan's Towing Racing	Ford	28.736	125.278
24	7	Takuma Koga	Jerry Pitts Racing	Toyota	28.880	124.654
25	05	David Smith (R)	Shockwave Motorsports	Toyota	29.449	122.245
26	12	Ryan Roulette	Fast Track Racing	Ford	31.081	115.826
27	27	Bobby Hillis Jr.	Fierce Creature Racing	Chevrolet	31.232	115.266
28	1	Jake Finch	Phoenix Racing	Toyota	37.162	96.873
29	11	Robbie Kennealy	3K Motorsports	Ford	–	–
Official qualifying results

== Race results ==
Fin	St	#	Driver	Team	Make	Laps	Led	Status	Pts
1	1	18	William Sawalich	Joe Gibbs Racing	Toyota	100	93	Running	49
2	3	20	Dean Thompson	Venturini Motorsports	Toyota	100	0	Running	42
3	2	15	Sean Hingorani (R)	Venturini Motorsports	Toyota	100	7	Running	42
4	5	28	Jack Wood	Pinnacle Racing Group	Chevrolet	100	0	Running	40
5	8	13	Tyler Reif (R)	Central Coast Racing	Toyota	100	0	Running	39
6	7	97	Landen Lewis	CR7 Motorsports	Chevrolet	100	0	Running	38
7	10	23	Bradley Erickson (R)	Sigma Performance Services	Toyota	100	0	Running	37
8	6	16	Tanner Reif	Bill McAnally Racing	Chevrolet	100	0	Running	36
9	4	17	Kaden Honeycutt	McGowan Motorsports	Toyota	100	0	Running	35
10	14	2	Sebastian Arias	Rev Racing	Chevrolet	100	0	Running	34
11	16	25	Toni Breidinger	Venturini Motorsports	Toyota	100	0	Running	33
12	13	46	Justin Johnson	Lowden Jackson Motorsports	Ford	100	0	Running	32
13	22	21	Ethan Nascimento (R)	Nascimento Motorsports	Chevrolet	100	0	Running	31
14	20	70	Kyle Keller	Jerry Pitts Racing	Ford	100	0	Running	30
15	17	02	Dylan Smith	Young's Motorsports	Chevrolet	99	0	Running	29
16	24	7	Takuma Koga	Jerry Pitts Racing	Toyota	99	0	Running	28
17	9	6	Lavar Scott	Rev Racing	Chevrolet	99	0	Running	27
18	28	11	Robbie Kennealy	3K Motorsports	Ford	97	0	Running	26
19	15	4	Eric Nascimento	Nascimento Motorsports	Chevrolet	97	0	Running	25
20	21	50	Trevor Huddleston	High Point Racing	Ford	96	0	Running	24
21	19	41	Johnny Borneman III	Lowden Jackson Motorsports	Ford	96	0	Running	23
22	12	55	Kris Wright	Venturini Motorsports	Toyota	96	0	Running	22
23	25	05	David Smith (R)	Shockwave Motorsports	Toyota	94	0	Running	21
24	26	12	Ryan Roulette	Fast Track Racing	Ford	83	0	Running	20
25	18	88	Joey Iest	Naake-Klauer Motorsports	Ford	82	0	Running	19
26	11	3	Todd Souza	Central Coast Racing	Ford	64	0	Accident	18
27	23	71	Nick Joanides	Jan's Towing Racing	Ford	64	0	Accident	17
28	27	27	Bobby Hillis Jr.	Fierce Creature Racing	Chevrolet	5	0	Mechanical	16
Official race results

== Standings after the race ==
Drivers' Championship standings

	Pos	Driver	Points
	1	Sean Hingorani	575
1	2	Tyler Reif	539 (-36)
1	3	Trevor Huddleston	527 (-48)
1	4	Bradley Erickson	522 (-53)
1	5	Tanner Reif	517 (-58)
2	6	Todd Souza	503 (-72)
	7	Eric Nascimento	498 (-77)
	8	Kyle Keller	496 (-79)
	9	Takuma Koga	466 (-109)
	10	David Smith	459 (-116)

- Note: Only the first 10 positions are included for the driver standings.

Previous race: 2023 51FIFTY Jr. ARCA Homecoming 150	ARCA Menards Series West; 2023 season	Next race: 2024 General Tire 150 (Phoenix)
