= 2023 General Tire 200 (Sonoma) =

5th race of the 2023 ARCA Menards Series West

Race details
- Race 5 of 12 of the 2023 ARCA Menards Series West
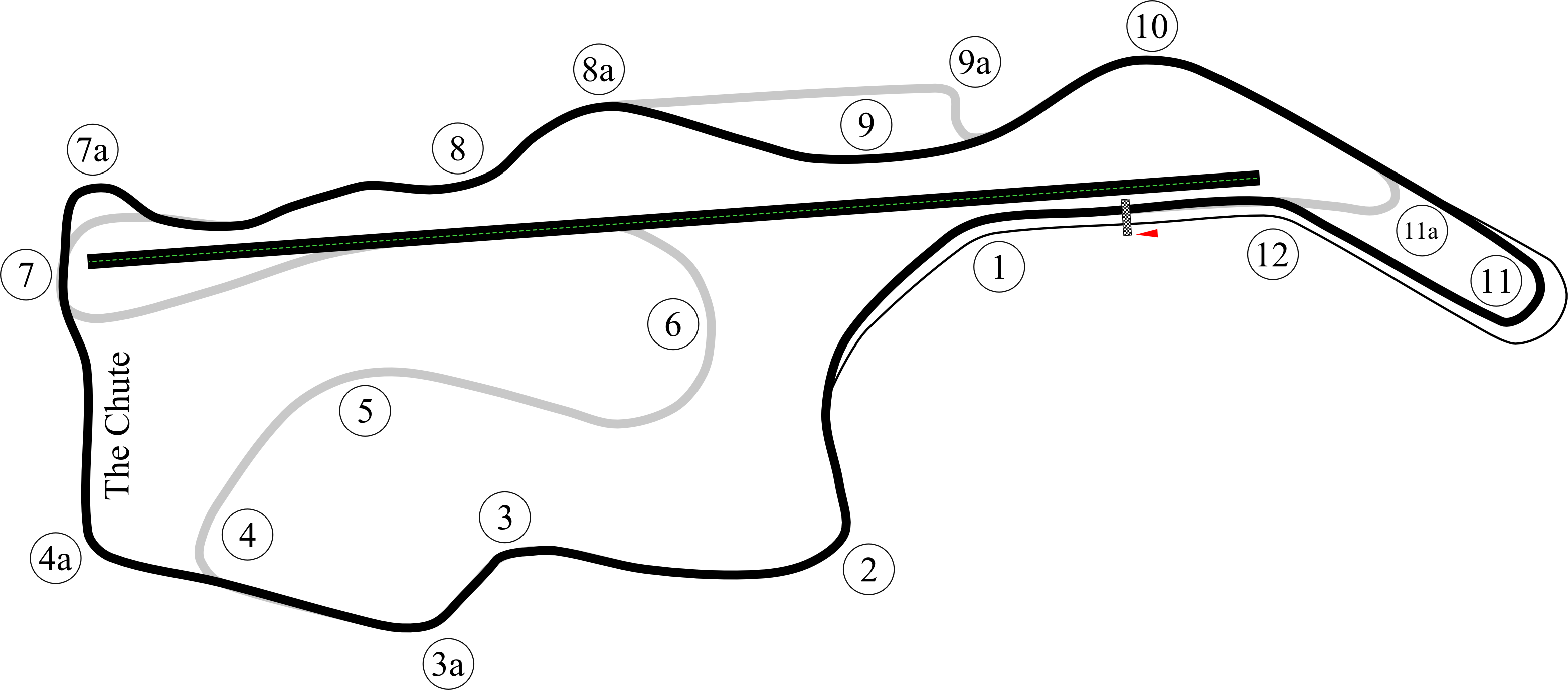
- Date: June 9, 2023
- Official name: 17th Annual General Tire 200
- Location: Sonoma Raceway in Sonoma, California
- Course: Permanent racing facility
- Course length: 3.20 km (1.99 miles)
- Distance: 64 laps, 127 mi (205 km)
- Scheduled distance: 64 laps, 127 mi (205 km)
- Average speed: 68.595 mph (110.393 km/h)

Pole position
Driver	Ryan Preece	Stewart–Haas Racing
- Time: 1:19.410

Most laps led
Driver	Ryan Preece	Stewart–Haas Racing
- Laps: 50

Winner
No. 9	Ryan Preece	Stewart–Haas Racing

Television in the United States
- Network: FloRacing
- Announcers: Charles Krall

Radio in the United States
- Radio: ARCA Racing Network

The 2023 General Tire 200 was the 5th stock car race of the 2023 ARCA Menards Series West season, and the 17th running of the event. The race was held on Friday, June 9, 2023, at Sonoma Raceway in Sonoma, California, a 1.99 mile (3.20 km) permanent asphalt road course. The race took the scheduled 64 laps to complete. Ryan Preece, driving for Stewart–Haas Racing, would put on a blistering performance, winning the pole and leading a race-high 50 laps to earn his first career ARCA Menards Series West win, and his first of the season. Landen Lewis led 14 laps of the race, before being involved in an accident on lap 47, officially credited with a 19th place finish. To fill out the podium, Sammy Smith, driving for Hattori Racing Enterprises, and Riley Herbst, driving for Jerry Pitts Racing, would finish 2nd and 3rd, respectively.

== Report ==
=== Background ===
Layout of Sonoma Raceway, the circuit where the race was held.

Sonoma Raceway is a 1.99-mile (3.20 km) road course and drag strip located on the landform known as Sears Point in the southern Sonoma Mountains in Sonoma, California, U.S. The road course features 12 turns on a hilly course with 160 feet (49 m) of total elevation change. It is host to one of only seven NASCAR Cup Series races each year that are run on road courses. It is also host to the NTT IndyCar Series and several other auto races and motorcycle races such as the American Federation of Motorcyclists series. Sonoma Raceway continues to host amateur, or club racing events which may or may not be open to the general public. The largest such car club is the Sports Car Club of America. In 2022, the race was reverted to racing the club configuration.

==== Entry list ====
- (R) denotes rookie driver.

#	Driver	Team	Make	Sponsor
02	Parker Retzlaff	Young's Motorsports	Chevrolet	Ponsse / Pewag group
2	Sebastian Arias	Rev Racing	Chevrolet	Brady IFS / Rubbermaid
4	Eric Nascimento	Nascimento Motorsports	Toyota	Phillips Brothers Fabrication / Impact Transportation
05	David Smith (R)	Shockwave Motorsports	Toyota	Shockwave Marine Suspension Seating
5	Riley Herbst	Jerry Pitts Racing	Ford	Jerry Pitts Racing
6	Jack Wood	Rev Racing	Chevrolet	Velocity Racing
7	Takuma Koga	Jerry Pitts Racing	Toyota	Lobster Professional Tools
8	Johnny Borneman III	Borneman Motorsports	Ford	FilterTime / BTI Heavy Haul
9	Ryan Preece	Stewart–Haas Racing	Ford	Bonanza Cabernet
13	Todd Souza	Central Coast Racing	Ford	Central Coast Cabinets
14	Davey Magras	Davey Magras Racing	Chevrolet	Advanced Autoworks / Koerner Racing Engines
15	Sean Hingorani (R)	Venturini Motorsports	Toyota	Mobil 1
16	Tanner Reif	Bill McAnally Racing	Chevrolet	NAPA Auto Care
17	Landen Lewis	McGowan Motorsports	Chevrolet	Rentsource / American Resurfacing Inc.
18	William Sawalich	Joe Gibbs Racing	Toyota	Starkey / SoundGear
19	Eric Johnson Jr.	Bill McAnally Racing	Chevrolet	Pacific Office Automation
21	Ethan Nascimento (R)	Nascimento Motorsports	Toyota	Kleen Blast / Impact Transportation
32	Dale Quarterley	1/4 Ley Racing	Chevrolet	Van Dyk Recycling Solutions / Motul
41	Tyler Reif (R)	Lowden Jackson Motorsports	Ford	Nevada Tourism / Stoney's
46	Stefan Rzesnowiecky	Lowden Jackson Motorsports	Ford	Stoney's / Lowden Jackson Motorsports
50	Trevor Huddleston	High Point Racing	Ford	Racecar Factory
52	Ryan Philpott	Philpott Race Cars	Toyota	Pentair
55	Cole Custer	High Point Racing	Ford	Pristine Auction
70	Kyle Keller	Jerry Pitts Racing	Chevrolet	KISMIF Foundation / Blaster SwissLube
77	Nick Joanides	Performance P–1 Motorsports	Toyota	Jan's Towing / King Taco
80	Brian Kamisky	Legal Limit Motorsports	Chevrolet	SK Construction / Wards Concrete
81	Sammy Smith	Hattori Racing Enterprises	Toyota	Oakley
86	Tim Spurgeon	Spurgeon Motorsports	Chevrolet	Kleen Blast / Davids Racing Products
88	Bradley Erickson (R)	Naake-Klauer Motorsports	Ford	L&S Framing
Official entry list

== Practice ==
The first and only practice session was held on Friday, June 9, at 11:00 AM PST, and would last for 1 hour. Sammy Smith, driving for Hattori Racing Enterprises, would set the fastest time in the session, with a lap of 1:20.383, and a speed of 89.123 mph (143.430 km/h).

Pos.	#	Driver	Team	Make	Time	Speed
1	81	Sammy Smith	Hattori Racing Enterprises	Toyota	1:20.383	89.123
2	17	Landen Lewis	McGowan Motorsports	Chevrolet	1:20.578	88.908
3	55	Cole Custer	High Point Racing	Ford	1:20.965	88.483
Full practice results

== Qualifying ==
Qualifying was held on Friday, June 9, at 12:10 PM PST. The qualifying system used is a multi-car, multi-lap based system. All drivers will be on track for a 20-minute timed session, and whoever sets the fastest time in the session will win the pole.

Ryan Preece, driving for Stewart–Haas Racing, would score the pole for the race, with a lap of 1:19.410, and a speed of 90.215 mph (145.187 km/h).

=== Qualifying results ===
Pos.	#	Driver	Team	Make	Time	Speed
1	9	Ryan Preece	Stewart–Haas Racing	Ford	1:19.410	90.215
2	17	Landen Lewis	McGowan Motorsports	Chevrolet	1:19.992	89.559
3	81	Sammy Smith	Hattori Racing Enterprises	Toyota	1:20.052	89.492
4	4	Eric Nascimento	Nascimento Motorsports	Toyota	1:20.267	89.252
5	55	Cole Custer	High Point Racing	Ford	1:20.280	89.238
6	5	Riley Herbst	Jerry Pitts Racing	Ford	1:20.628	88.853
7	02	Parker Retzlaff	Young's Motorsports	Chevrolet	1:20.774	88.692
8	6	Jack Wood	Rev Racing	Chevrolet	1:20.789	88.675
9	18	William Sawalich	Joe Gibbs Racing	Toyota	1:20.868	88.589
10	2	Sebastian Arias	Rev Racing	Chevrolet	1:20.903	88.550
11	88	Bradley Erickson (R)	Naake-Klauer Motorsports	Ford	1:20.915	88.537
12	15	Sean Hingorani (R)	Venturini Motorsports	Toyota	1:21.175	88.254
13	50	Trevor Huddleston	High Point Racing	Ford	1:21.563	87.834
14	13	Todd Souza	Central Coast Racing	Ford	1:21.600	87.794
15	8	Johnny Borneman III	Borneman Motorsports	Ford	1:21.782	87.599
16	32	Dale Quarterley	1/4 Ley Racing	Chevrolet	1:21.870	87.505
17	41	Tyler Reif (R)	Lowden Jackson Motorsports	Ford	1:22.001	87.365
18	19	Eric Johnson Jr.	Bill McAnally Racing	Chevrolet	1:22.193	87.161
19	16	Tanner Reif	Bill McAnally Racing	Chevrolet	1:22.247	87.103
20	86	Tim Spurgeon	Spurgeon Motorsports	Chevrolet	1:23.139	86.169
21	80	Brian Kamisky	Legal Limit Motorsports	Chevrolet	1:23.266	86.038
22	21	Ethan Nascimento (R)	Nascimento Motorsports	Toyota	1:24.344	84.938
23	70	Kyle Keller	Jerry Pitts Racing	Chevrolet	1:24.830	84.451
24	7	Takuma Koga	Jerry Pitts Racing	Toyota	1:26.106	83.200
25	14	Davey Magras	Davey Magras Racing	Chevrolet	1:26.978	82.366
26	05	David Smith (R)	Shockwave Motorsports	Toyota	1:29.424	80.113
27	46	Stefan Rzesnowiecky	Lowden Jackson Motorsports	Ford	–	–
28	77	Nick Joanides	Performance P–1 Motorsports	Toyota	–	–
29	52	Ryan Philpott	Philpott Race Cars	Toyota	–	–
Official qualifying results

== Race results ==
Fin	St	#	Driver	Team	Make	Laps	Led	Status	Pts
1	1	9	Ryan Preece	Stewart–Haas Racing	Ford	64	50	Running	49
2	3	81	Sammy Smith	Hattori Racing Enterprises	Toyota	64	0	Running	42
3	6	5	Riley Herbst	Jerry Pitts Racing	Ford	64	0	Running	41
4	8	6	Jack Wood	Rev Racing	Chevrolet	64	0	Running	40
5	9	18	William Sawalich	Joe Gibbs Racing	Toyota	64	0	Running	39
6	12	15	Sean Hingorani (R)	Venturini Motorsports	Toyota	64	0	Running	88
7	11	88	Bradley Erickson (R)	Naake-Klauer Motorsports	Ford	64	0	Running	87
8	14	13	Todd Souza	Central Coast Racing	Ford	64	0	Running	86
9	15	8	Johnny Borneman III	Borneman Motorsports	Ford	64	0	Running	35
10	22	21	Ethan Nascimento (R)	Nascimento Motorsports	Toyota	64	0	Running	84
11	16	32	Dale Quarterley	1/4 Ley Racing	Chevrolet	64	0	Running	33
13	20	86	Tim Spurgeon	Spurgeon Motorsports	Chevrolet	64	0	Running	32
12	23	70	Kyle Keller	Jerry Pitts Racing	Chevrolet	63	0	Running	81
14	28	77	Nick Joanides	Performance P–1 Motorsports	Toyota	63	0	Running	30
15	26	05	David Smith (R)	Shockwave Motorsports	Toyota	63	0	Running	79
16	25	14	Davey Magras	Davey Magras Racing	Chevrolet	62	0	Running	28
17	17	41	Tyler Reif (R)	Lowden Jackson Motorsports	Ford	61	0	Engine	77
18	5	55	Cole Custer	High Point Racing	Ford	56	0	Transmission	26
19	2	17	Landen Lewis	McGowan Motorsports	Chevrolet	56	14	Running	76
20	19	16	Tanner Reif	Bill McAnally Racing	Chevrolet	55	0	Running	74
21	10	2	Sebastian Arias	Rev Racing	Chevrolet	55	0	Running	23
22	21	80	Brian Kamisky	Legal Limit Motorsports	Chevrolet	54	0	Axle	22
23	4	4	Eric Nascimento	Nascimento Motorsports	Toyota	45	0	Accident	71
24	24	7	Takuma Koga	Jerry Pitts Racing	Toyota	39	0	Axle	70
25	10	02	Parker Retzlaff	Young's Motorsports	Chevrolet	37	0	Electrical	19
26	29	52	Ryan Philpott	Philpott Race Cars	Chevrolet	36	0	Axle	18
27	18	19	Eric Johnson Jr.	Bill McAnally Racing	Chevrolet	31	0	Transmission	17
28	13	50	Trevor Huddleston	High Point Racing	Ford	12	0	Mechanical	66
29	27	46	Stefan Rzesnowiecky	Lowden Jackson Motorsports	Ford	0	0	DNS	15
Official race results

== Standings after the race ==
Drivers' Championship standings

	Pos	Driver	Points
1	1	Sean Hingorani	245
1	2	Landen Lewis	245
1	3	Bradley Erickson	242 (–3)
1	4	Tyler Reif	232 (–13)
	5	Trevor Huddleston	217 (–28)
	6	Tanner Reif	215 (–30)
	7	Kyle Keller	212 (–33)
1	8	Todd Souza	209 (–36)
1	9	David Smith	202 (–43)
2	10	Takuma Koga	200 (–45)

- Note: Only the first 10 positions are included for the driver standings.

Previous race: 2023 Portland 112	ARCA Menards Series West; 2023 season	Next race: 2023 NAPA Auto Parts BlueDEF 150 (Irwindale)
