= Ethan Nascimento =

American racing driver (born 2007)

- Nascimento at Madera Speedway in 2026
- Born: June 9, 2007 (age 19); Ripon, California, U.S.

ARCA Menards Series career
- 1 race run over 1 year
- Best finish: 113th (2023)
- First race: 2023 General Tire 150 (Phoenix)
| Wins | Top tens | Poles |
|---|---|---|
| 0 | 0 | 0 |

ARCA Menards Series West career
- 14 races run over 2 years
- Best finish: 12th (2023)
- First race: 2023 General Tire 150 (Phoenix)
- Last race: 2026 Madera 150 (Madera)
- First win: 2026 NAPA Auto Parts 150 (Roseville)
| Wins | Top tens | Poles |
|---|---|---|
| 1 | 7 | 0 |
- Statistics up to date as of September 27, 2026.

Ethan Nascimento (born June 9, 2007) is an American professional stock car racing driver. He last competed part-time in the ARCA Menards Series West, driving the No. 4/21 Chevrolet for Nascimento Motorsports.

== Racing career ==
=== Early racing career ===
Nascimento first started racing at the age of five, when he raced in go-karts before progressing to the Mini Swift category in 2015 racing for SuperKarts USA on the National stage. After running in the category for three years, he would move to bandoleros in the middle of 2018 while still competing Nationally in Karting with Superkarts USA and ROK USA. He would go on to win eight races in Bandoleros in 2018-2019 between Madera Speedway and Las Vegas Motors Speedway. Winning the Las Vegas Road Course Championship and finishing second in the Madera Championship for 2019.

In 2020, Nascimento would race in Legends cars for Donny St. Ours Racing over fifty events traveling all over the country chasing the biggest stages. In 2021, he would continue running Legends, again racing over fifty main events, while making the move up to moving to junior late models for his family's team Nascimento Motorsports, where he would go on to win the rookie of the year honors after finishing fourth in the points standings that year despite only running limited events due to the effects of the COVID-19 pandemic and his family ARCA team schedule would conflict with changed dates. In 2022, Nascimento would move to the 51Fifty Junior Pro Late Model Series full time, where he would win five races and the championship at Madera, while also winning at the Stockton 99 that season. He also ran select starts in the SRL SPEARS Pro Late Model Series and the INEX Nashville Spring Series.

=== ARCA Menards Series West ===
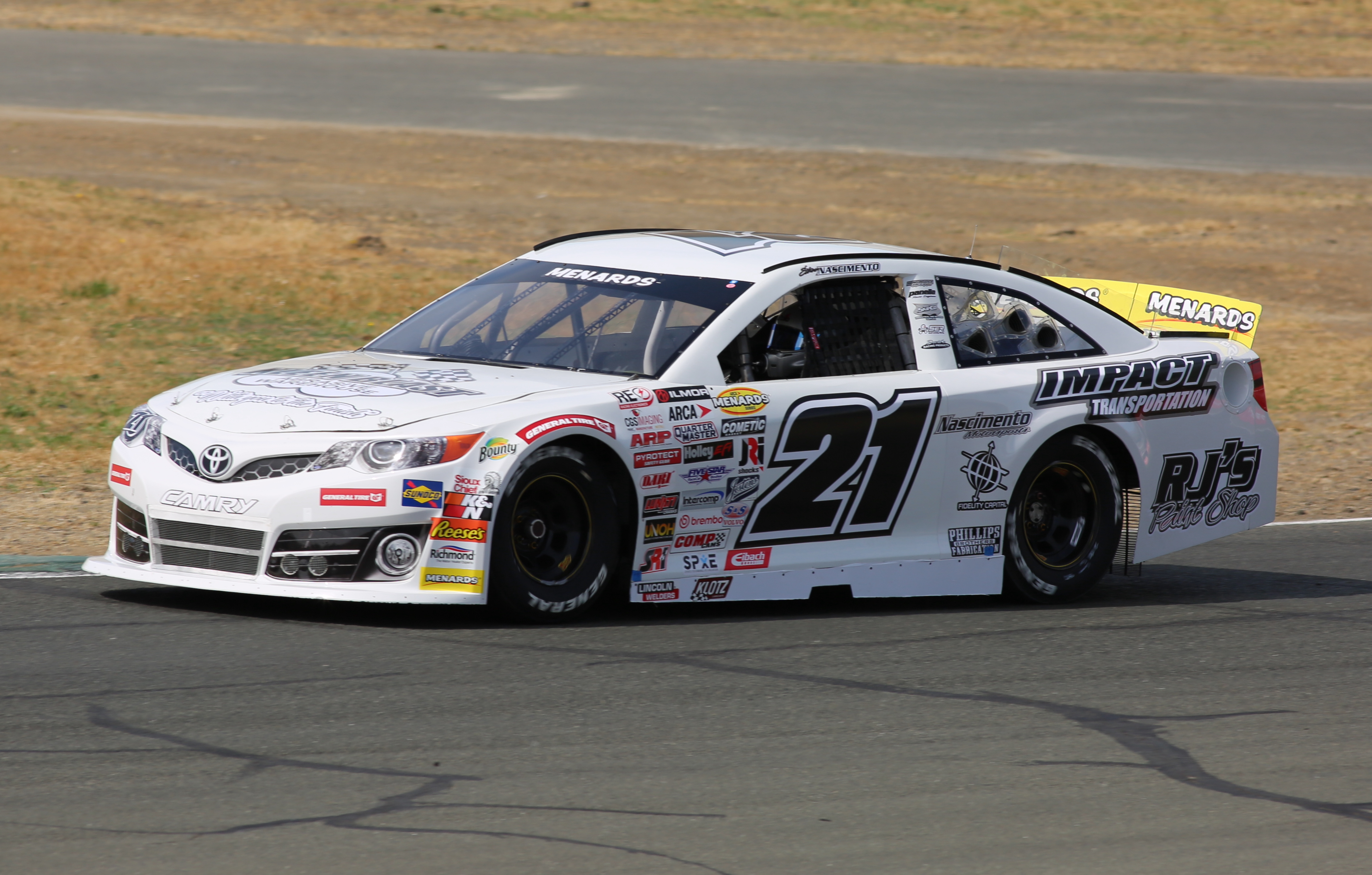
Nascimento's No. 21 ARCA car at Sonoma in 2023

In 2023, it was announced that he and his brother Eric would run full-time in the West Series in the No. 04 and No. 4 respectively for Nascimento Motorsports. He however ran only nine of the twelve races on the schedule, and finished twelfth in the final points standings with a best finish of eighth at Irwindale Speedway.

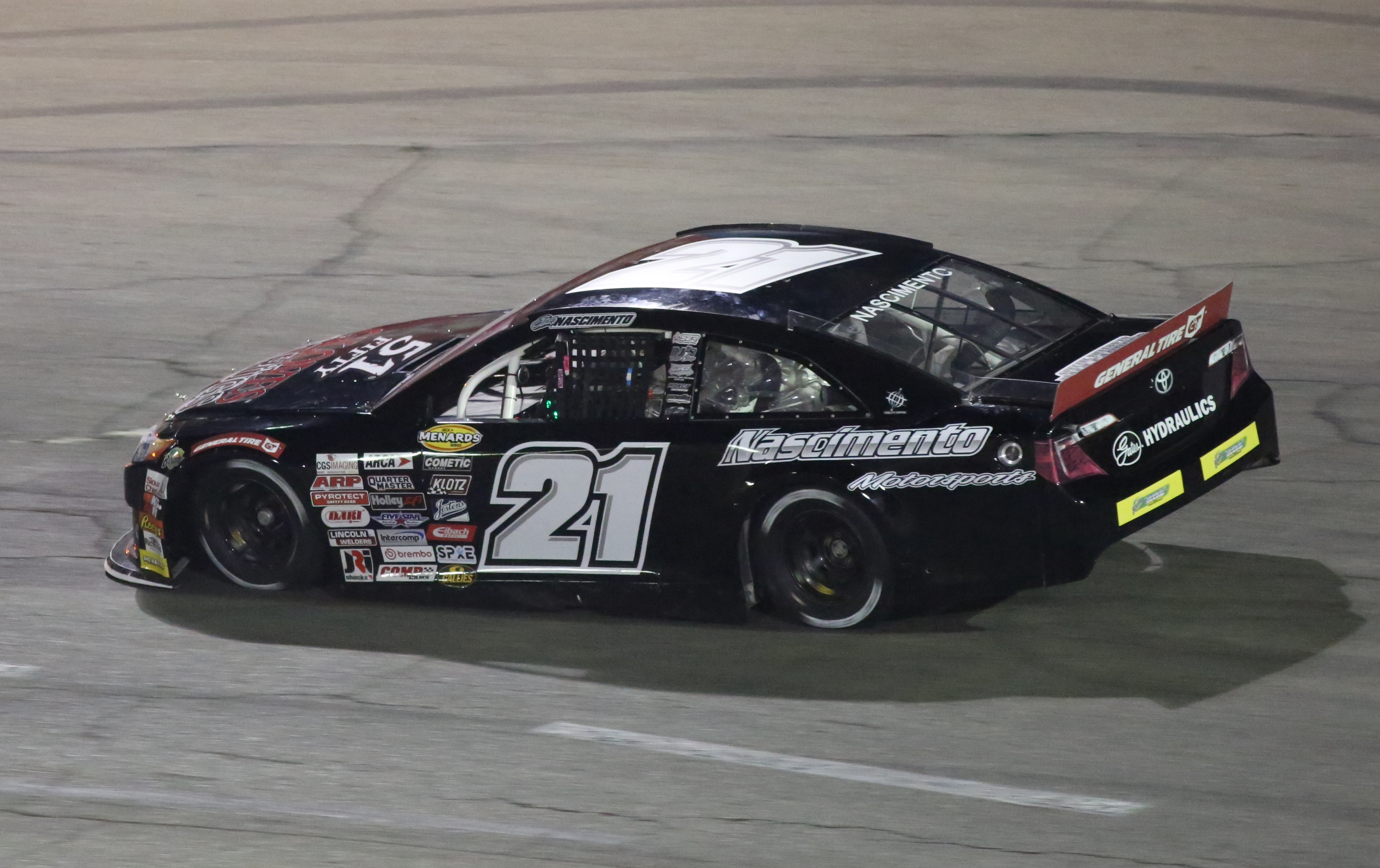
Nascimento's No. 21 car at All American Speedway in 2024.

In 2024, it was revealed that Nascimento would return to the series at Madera Speedway, driving the No. 21 Toyota for Nascimento Motorsports. After placing eighth in the lone practice session, he qualified in seventh and finished in third place.

In 2026, Nascimento made a one-off start at All American Speedway in the No. 4, where he got his first career win.

== Personal life ==
Nascimento is the younger brother of fellow driver and team owner Eric Nascimento. He currently attends Ripon High School in Ripon, California.

== Motorsports career results ==
=== ARCA Menards Series ===
(key) (Bold – Pole position awarded by qualifying time. Italics – Pole position earned by points standings or practice time. * – Most laps led. ** – All laps led.)

ARCA Menards Series results
| Year | Team | No. | Make | 1 | 2 | 3 | 4 | 5 | 6 | 7 | 8 | 9 | 10 | 11 | 12 | 13 | 14 | 15 | 16 | 17 | 18 | 19 | 20 | AMSC | Pts | Ref |
|---|---|---|---|---|---|---|---|---|---|---|---|---|---|---|---|---|---|---|---|---|---|---|---|---|---|---|
| 2023 | Nascimento Motorsports | 04 | Toyota | DAY | PHO; 26 | TAL | KAN | CLT | BLN | ELK | MOH | IOW | POC | MCH | IRP | GLN | ISF | MLW | DSF | KAN | BRI | SLM | TOL | 113th | 18 | |

==== ARCA Menards Series West ====
ARCA Menards Series West results
| Year | Team | No. | Make | 1 | 2 | 3 | 4 | 5 | 6 | 7 | 8 | 9 | 10 | 11 | 12 | 13 | AMSWC | Pts | Ref |
|---|---|---|---|---|---|---|---|---|---|---|---|---|---|---|---|---|---|---|---|
| 2023 | Nascimento Motorsports | 04 | Toyota | PHO; 26 | IRW; 13 | KCR; 8 | PIR; 23 | | | | | | | | | | 12th | 361 | |
| 2023 | Nascimento Motorsports | 21 | Toyota | | | | | SON; 10 | IRW; 14 | SHA | EVG; 14 | AAS; Wth | LVS | | | | 12th | 361 | |
| 2023 | Nascimento Motorsports | 21 | Chevy | | | | | | | | | | | MAD; 14 | PHO; 13 | | 12th | 361 | |
| 2024 | Nascimento Motorsports | 21 | Toyota | PHO | KER | PIR | SON | IRW | IRW | SHA | TRI | MAD; 3 | AAS; 6 | KER; 10 | PHO; PR^{†} | | 24th | 113 | |
| 2026 | Nascimento Motorsports | 4 | Chevy | KER | PHO | TUC | SHA | CNS | TRI | SON | PIR | AAS; 1 | | | | | 28th | 84 | |
| 2026 | Nascimento Motorsports | 21 | Chevy | | | | | | | | | | MAD; 7 | LVS | PHO | KER | 28th | 84 | |
^{†} – Practiced for Alex Malycke
