= Joe Farré =

American racing driver

- Born: May 4, 1967 (age 59); Henderson, Nevada, U.S.

ARCA Menards Series career
- 1 race run over 1 year
- Best finish: 118th (2024)
- First race: 2024 General Tire 150 (Phoenix)
| Wins | Top tens | Poles |
|---|---|---|
| 0 | 0 | 0 |

ARCA Menards Series West career
- 1 race run over 1 year
- Best finish: 78th (2024)
- First race: 2024 General Tire 150 (Phoenix)
| Wins | Top tens | Poles |
|---|---|---|
| 0 | 0 | 0 |
- Statistics up to date as of March 9, 2024.

Joe Farré (born May 4, 1967) is an American professional stock car racing driver and team owner who last competed part-time in the ARCA Menards Series West, driving the No. 24 Chevrolet for Sigma Performance Services.

== Racing career ==
Farré is a longtime competitor in the SRL Spears Southwest Tour Series, where he achieved twelve top tens in 48 races between 2006 and 2022. He has also competed in the ASA Truck Series, having run in the series full-time from 2004 to 2005, finishing tenth in points in the former year.

In 2023, Farré formed his own ARCA Menards Series West team midway through the year, named Sigma Performance Services, with business partner T. J. Clark, and signed Bradley Erickson to drive the No. 23 Chevy from the seventh race onwards.

In 2024, at the season opening race at Phoenix Raceway, the team expanded to two cars, with NASCAR Craftsman Truck Series driver Grant Enfinger driving the No. 23 Chevrolet, and Farré attempting to make his series debut in the No. 24. After placing 29th in the lone practice session, he qualified for the race in 28th, but finished in 35th due to electrical issues. He was originally scheduled to enter in the next race at Kevin Harvick's Kern Raceway, but had to withdraw due to his company overseeing the cleanup of the Francis Scott Key Bridge, which had collapsed weeks prior; he would be replaced by Sean Hingorani.

== Motorsports results ==
=== ARCA Menards Series ===
(key) (Bold – Pole position awarded by qualifying time. Italics – Pole position earned by points standings or practice time. * – Most laps led.)

ARCA Menards Series results
| Year | Team | No. | Make | 1 | 2 | 3 | 4 | 5 | 6 | 7 | 8 | 9 | 10 | 11 | 12 | 13 | 14 | 15 | 16 | 17 | 18 | 19 | 20 | AMSC | Pts | Ref |
|---|---|---|---|---|---|---|---|---|---|---|---|---|---|---|---|---|---|---|---|---|---|---|---|---|---|---|
| 2024 | Sigma Performance Services | 24 | Chevy | DAY | PHO; 35 | TAL | DOV | KAN | CLT | IOW | MOH | BLN | IRP | SLM | ELK | MCH | ISF | MLW | DSF | GLN | BRI | KAN | TOL | 118th | 9 | |

==== ARCA Menards Series West ====
ARCA Menards Series West results
| Year | Team | No. | Make | 1 | 2 | 3 | 4 | 5 | 6 | 7 | 8 | 9 | 10 | 11 | 12 | AMSWC | Pts | Ref |
|---|---|---|---|---|---|---|---|---|---|---|---|---|---|---|---|---|---|---|
| 2024 | Sigma Performance Services | 24 | Chevy | PHO; 35 | KER; Wth | PIR | SON | IRW | IRW | SHA | TRI | MAD | AAS | KER | PHO | 78th | 9 | |
