= 2023 General Tire 150 (Phoenix) =

2nd race of the 2023 ARCA Menards Series

Race details
- Race 2 of 20 of the 2023 ARCA Menards Series; Race 1 of 12 of the 2023 ARCA Menards Series West
- Date: March 10, 2023
- Official name: 4th Annual General Tire 150
- Location: Phoenix Raceway, Avondale, Arizona
- Course: Permanent racing facility
- Course length: 2 miles (1.6 km)
- Distance: 160 laps, 160 mi (257 km)
- Scheduled distance: 150 laps, 150 mi (240 km)
- Average speed: 125.404 mph (201.818 km/h)

Pole position
Driver	William Sawalich	Joe Gibbs Racing
- Time: 27.153

Most laps led
Driver	William Sawalich	Joe Gibbs Racing
- Laps: 93

Winner
No. 41	Tyler Reif	Lowden Jackson Motorsports

Television in the United States
- Network: FS2
- Announcers: Jamie Little, Phil Parsons, and Austin Cindric

Radio in the United States
- Radio: MRN

The 2023 General Tire 150 was the second stock car race of the 2023 ARCA Menards Series season, the first race of the 2023 ARCA Menards Series West season, and the 4th iteration of the event. The race was held on Friday, March 10, 2023, in Avondale, Arizona at Phoenix Raceway, a 1-mile (1.6 km) permanent tri-oval shaped asphalt speedway. The race was increased from 150 laps to 160 laps, due to a NASCAR overtime finish. In a wreck-filled race, Tyler Reif, driving for Lowden Jackson Motorsports, scored the upset win after passing Landen Lewis for the lead on the final lap. This was Reif's first career ARCA Menards Series and ARCA Menards Series West win in only his third start. William Sawalich, who started on the pole, dominated the majority of the race, leading 93 laps before getting spun with two laps to go. To fill out the podium, Bradley Erickson, driving for Naake-Klauer Motorsports, would finish in 3rd, respectively.

== Background ==
Phoenix Raceway is a 1-mile, low-banked tri-oval race track located in Avondale, Arizona, near Phoenix. The motorsport track opened in 1964 and currently hosts two NASCAR race weekends annually including the final championship race since 2020. Phoenix Raceway has also hosted the CART, IndyCar Series, USAC and the IMSA SportsCar Championship. The raceway is currently owned and operated by NASCAR.

=== Entry list ===
- (R) denotes rookie driver.

#	Driver	Team	Make
02	Leland Honeyman	Young's Motorsports	Chevrolet
2	Andrés Pérez de Lara (R)	Rev Racing	Chevrolet
03	Alex Clubb	Clubb Racing Inc.	Ford
04	Ethan Nascimento	Nascimento Motorsports	Toyota
4	Eric Nascimento	Nascimento Motorsports	Chevrolet
05	David Smith	Shockwave Motorsports	Toyota
06	A. J. Moyer	Wayne Peterson Racing	Chevrolet
6	Jack Wood	Rev Racing	Chevrolet
7	Takuma Koga	Jerry Pitts Racing	Toyota
10	Tim Monroe	Fast Track Racing	Ford
11	Bryce Haugeberg	Fast Track Racing	Toyota
12	D. L. Wilson	Fast Track Racing	Chevrolet
13	Todd Souza	Central Coast Racing	Ford
15	Sean Hingorani (R)	Venturini Motorsports	Toyota
16	Tanner Reif	Bill McAnally Racing	Chevrolet
17	Landen Lewis	McGowan Motorsports	Chevrolet
18	William Sawalich	Joe Gibbs Racing	Toyota
20	Jesse Love	Venturini Motorsports	Toyota
25	Conner Jones	Venturini Motorsports	Toyota
27	Bobby Hillis Jr.	Fierce Creature Racing	Chevrolet
30	Frankie Muniz (R)	Rette Jones Racing	Ford
32	Christian Rose (R)	AM Racing	Ford
35	Greg Van Alst	Greg Van Alst Motorsports	Ford
41	Tyler Reif (R)	Lowden Jackson Motorsports	Ford
45	Tony Cosentino	Tamayo Cosentino Racing	Chevrolet
46	R. J. Smotherman (R)	Lowden Jackson Motorsports	Ford
48	Brad Smith	Brad Smith Motorsports	Ford
50	Trevor Huddleston	High Point Racing	Ford
55	Toni Breidinger	Venturini Motorsports	Toyota
66	Jon Garrett (R)	Veer Motorsports	Chevrolet
70	Kyle Keller	Jerry Pitts Racing	Toyota
88	Bradley Erickson (R)	Naake-Klauer Motorsports	Ford
Official entry list

== Practice ==
The first and only practice session was held on Friday, March 10, at 3:00 PM MST, and would last for 45 minutes. Tyler Reif, driving for Lowden Jackson Motorsports, would set the fastest time in the session, with a lap of 28.031, and an average speed of 128.429 mph (206.686 km/h).

Pos.	#	Driver	Team	Make	Time	Speed
1	41	Tyler Reif (R)	Lowden Jackson Motorsports	Ford	28.031	128.429
2	20	Jesse Love	Venturini Motorsports	Toyota	28.040	128.388
3	18	William Sawalich	Joe Gibbs Racing	Toyota	28.112	128.059
Full practice results

== Qualifying ==
Qualifying was held on Friday, March 10, at 4:30 PM MST. The qualifying system used is a single-car, single-lap system with only one round. Whoever sets the fastest time in that round wins the pole. William Sawalich, driving for Joe Gibbs Racing, would score the pole for the race, with a lap of 27.153, and an average speed of 132.582 mph (213.370 km/h).

Pos.	#	Driver	Team	Make	Time	Speed
1	18	William Sawalich	Joe Gibbs Racing	Toyota	27.153	132.582
2	6	Jack Wood	Rev Racing	Chevrolet	27.743	129.762
3	20	Jesse Love	Venturini Motorsports	Toyota	27.868	129.180
4	41	Tyler Reif (R)	Lowden Jackson Motorsports	Ford	27.872	129.162
5	02	Leland Honeyman	Young's Motorsports	Chevrolet	27.886	129.097
6	2	Andrés Pérez de Lara (R)	Rev Racing	Chevrolet	27.899	129.037
7	15	Sean Hingorani (R)	Venturini Motorsports	Toyota	27.953	128.788
8	25	Conner Jones	Venturini Motorsports	Toyota	27.974	128.691
9	55	Toni Breidinger	Venturini Motorsports	Toyota	28.000	128.571
10	17	Landen Lewis	McGowan Motorsports	Chevrolet	28.056	128.315
11	30	Frankie Muniz (R)	Rette Jones Racing	Ford	28.069	128.255
12	88	Bradley Erickson (R)	Naake-Klauer Motorsports	Ford	28.310	127.164
13	50	Trevor Huddleston	High Point Racing	Ford	28.310	127.164
14	35	Greg Van Alst	Greg Van Alst Motorsports	Ford	28.342	127.020
15	70	Kyle Keller	Jerry Pitts Racing	Toyota	28.492	126.351
16	13	Todd Souza	Central Coast Racing	Ford	28.536	126.156
17	4	Eric Nascimento	Nascimento Motorsports	Chevrolet	28.837	124.840
18	05	David Smith	Shockwave Motorsports	Toyota	28.887	124.624
19	7	Takuma Koga	Jerry Pitts Racing	Toyota	28.901	124.563
20	16	Tanner Reif	Bill McAnally Racing	Chevrolet	29.000	124.138
21	45	Tony Cosentino	Tamayo Cosentino Racing	Chevrolet	29.087	123.767
22	32	Christian Rose (R)	AM Racing	Ford	29.098	123.720
23	66	Jon Garrett (R)	Veer Motorsports	Chevrolet	29.222	123.195
24	12	D. L. Wilson	Fast Track Racing	Chevrolet	29.825	120.704
25	27	Bobby Hillis Jr.	Fierce Creature Racing	Chevrolet	31.512	114.242
26	10	Tim Monroe	Fast Track Racing	Ford	31.880	112.923
27	03	Alex Clubb	Clubb Racing Inc.	Ford	31.899	112.856
28	48	Brad Smith	Brad Smith Motorsports	Ford	32.553	110.589
29	04	Ethan Nascimento	Nascimento Motorsports	Toyota	–	–
30	06	A. J. Moyer	Wayne Peterson Racing	Chevrolet	–	–
31	46	R. J. Smotherman (R)	Lowden Jackson Motorsports	Ford	–	–
Withdrew
32	11	Bryce Haugeberg	Fast Track Racing	Toyota	–	–
33	22	Ryan Roulette	Ryan Roulette Racing	Ford	–	–
Official qualifying results

== Race results ==
Fin	St	#	Driver	Team	Make	Laps	Led	Status	Pts
1	4	41	Tyler Reif (R)	Lowden Jackson Motorsports	Ford	160	6	Running	47
2	10	17	Landen Lewis	McGowan Motorsports	Chevrolet	160	2	Running	43
3	12	88	Bradley Erickson (R)	Naake-Klauer Motorsports	Ford	160	0	Running	41
4	6	2	Andrés Pérez de Lara (R)	Rev Racing	Chevrolet	160	0	Running	40
5	15	70	Kyle Keller	Jerry Pitts Racing	Toyota	160	0	Running	39
6	11	30	Frankie Muniz (R)	Rette Jones Racing	Ford	160	0	Running	38
7	8	25	Conner Jones	Venturini Motorsports	Toyota	160	0	Running	37
8	5	02	Leland Honeyman	Young's Motorsports	Chevrolet	160	21	Running	37
9	13	50	Trevor Huddleston	High Point Racing	Ford	160	0	Running	35
10	14	35	Greg Van Alst	Greg Van Alst Motorsports	Ford	160	0	Running	34
11	16	13	Todd Souza	Central Coast Racing	Ford	160	0	Running	33
12	20	16	Tanner Reif	Bill McAnally Racing	Chevrolet	160	0	Running	32
13	1	18	William Sawalich	Joe Gibbs Racing	Toyota	160	93	Running	34
14	17	4	Eric Nascimento	Nascimento Motorsports	Chevrolet	159	0	Running	30
15	21	45	Tony Cosentino	Tamayo Cosentino Racing	Chevrolet	159	0	Running	29
16	7	15	Sean Hingorani (R)	Venturini Motorsports	Toyota	157	0	Running	28
17	18	05	David Smith	Shockwave Motorsports	Toyota	156	0	Running	27
18	27	03	Alex Clubb	Clubb Racing Inc.	Ford	156	0	Running	26
19	19	7	Takuma Koga	Jerry Pitts Racing	Toyota	154	0	Running	25
20	23	66	Jon Garrett (R)	Veer Motorsports	Chevrolet	154	0	Running	24
21	30	06	A. J. Moyer	Wayne Peterson Racing	Toyota	149	0	Running	23
22	9	55	Toni Breidinger	Venturini Motorsports	Toyota	146	0	Accident	22
23	22	32	Christian Rose (R)	AM Racing	Ford	146	0	Accident	21
24	24	12	D. L. Wilson	Fast Track Racing	Chevrolet	145	0	Accident	20
25	25	27	Bobby Hillis Jr.	Fierce Creature Racing	Chevrolet	125	0	Electrical	19
26	29	04	Ethan Nascimento	Nascimento Motorsports	Toyota	105	0	Oil Leak	18
27	3	20	Jesse Love	Venturini Motorsports	Toyota	83	38	Accident	18
28	2	6	Jack Wood	Rev Racing	Chevrolet	83	0	Accident	16
29	31	46	R. J. Smotherman (R)	Lowden Jackson Motorsports	Ford	26	0	Drive Train	15
30	28	48	Brad Smith	Brad Smith Motorsports	Ford	26	0	Clutch	14
31	26	10	Tim Monroe	Fast Track Racing	Ford	23	0	Power Steering	13
Official race results

== Standings after the race ==
Drivers' Championship standings (ARCA Main)

	Pos	Driver	Points
	1	Greg Van Alst	81
9	2	Frankie Muniz	71 (-10)
12	3	Tony Cosentino	58 (-23)
3	4	Jesse Love	55 (-26)
7	5	Christian Rose	54 (-27)
2	6	Jack Wood	52 (-29)
	7	Tyler Reif	47 (-34)
6	8	Connor Mosack	45 (-36)
	9	Landen Lewis	43 (-38)
30	10	Andrés Pérez de Lara	43 (-38)

Drivers' Championship standings (ARCA West)

Pos	Driver	Points
1	Tyler Reif	47
2	Landen Lewis	43 (-4)
3	Bradley Erickson	41 (-6)
4	Andrés Pérez de Lara	40 (-7)
5	Kyle Keller	39 (-8)
6	Frankie Muniz	38 (-9)
7	Leland Honeyman	37 (-10)
8	Conner Jones	37 (-10)
9	Trevor Huddleston	35 (-12)
10	Greg Van Alst	34 (-13)

- Note: Only the first 10 positions are included for the driver standings.

Previous race: 2023 BRANDT 200	ARCA Menards Series; 2023 season	Next race: 2023 General Tire 200 (Talladega)

Previous race: 2022 Desert Diamond Casino West Valley 100	ARCA Menards Series West; 2023 season	Next race: 2023 West Coast Stock Car Motorsports Hall of Fame 150
