= Bradley Erickson =

American racing driver

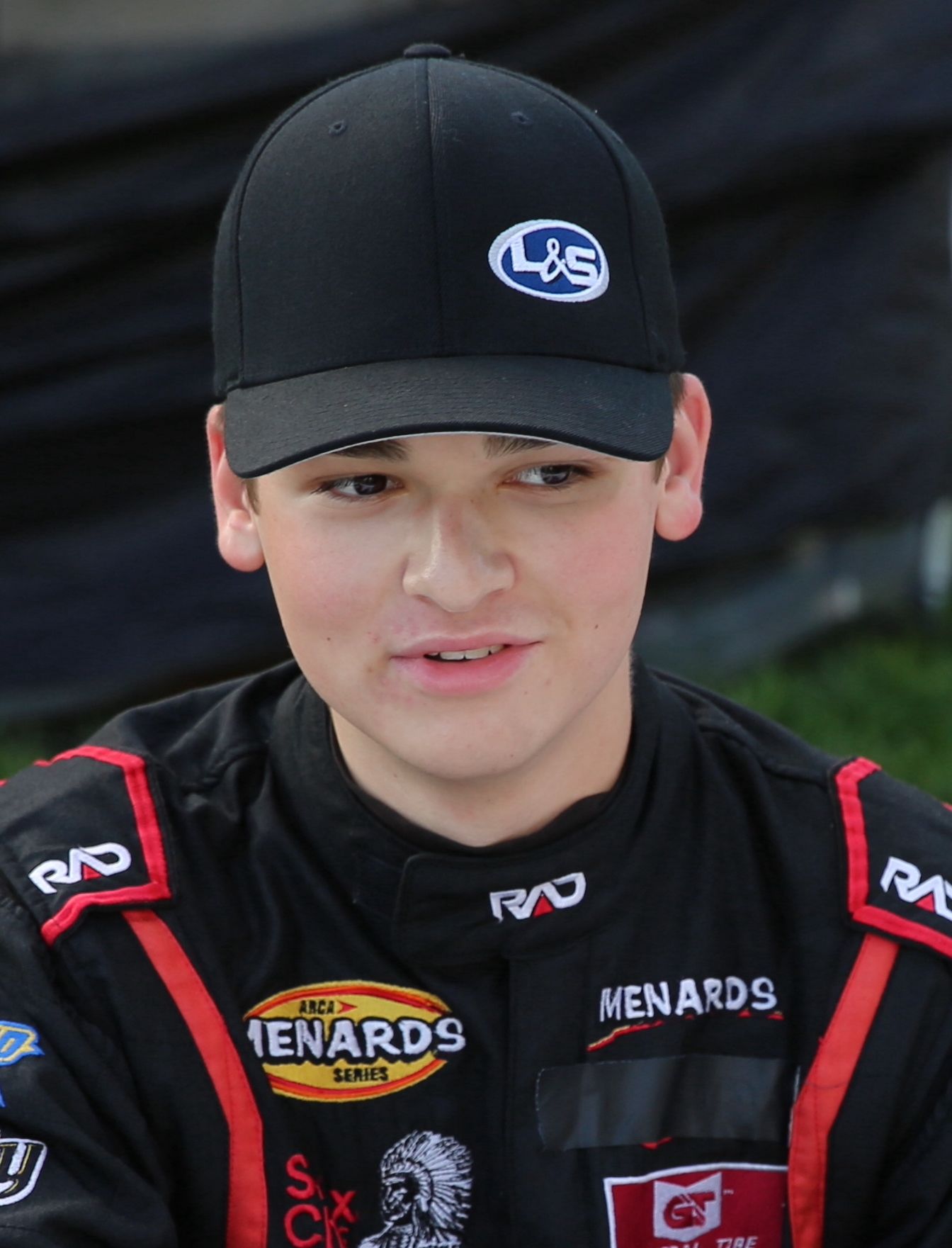
- Erickson at All American Speedway in 2023
- Born: Bradley Phillip Erickson; June 22, 2006 (age 20); Phoenix, Arizona, U.S.

ARCA Menards Series career
- 1 race run over 1 year
- Best finish: 70th (2023)
- First race: 2023 General Tire 150 (Phoenix)
Wins	Top tens	Poles
0	1	0

ARCA Menards Series West career
- 16 races run over 2 years
- Best finish: 4th (2023)
- First race: 2022 Irwindale 150 (Irwindale)
- Last race: 2023 Desert Diamond Casino West Valley 100 (Phoenix)
Wins	Top tens	Poles
0	11	0
- Statistics up to date as of May 21, 2023.

Bradley Phillip Erickson (born June 22, 2006) is an American professional stock car racing driver who last competed full-time in the ARCA Menards Series West, driving the No. 88 Ford for Naake-Klauer Motorsports, and the No. 23 Toyota for Sigma Performance Services.

== Racing career ==
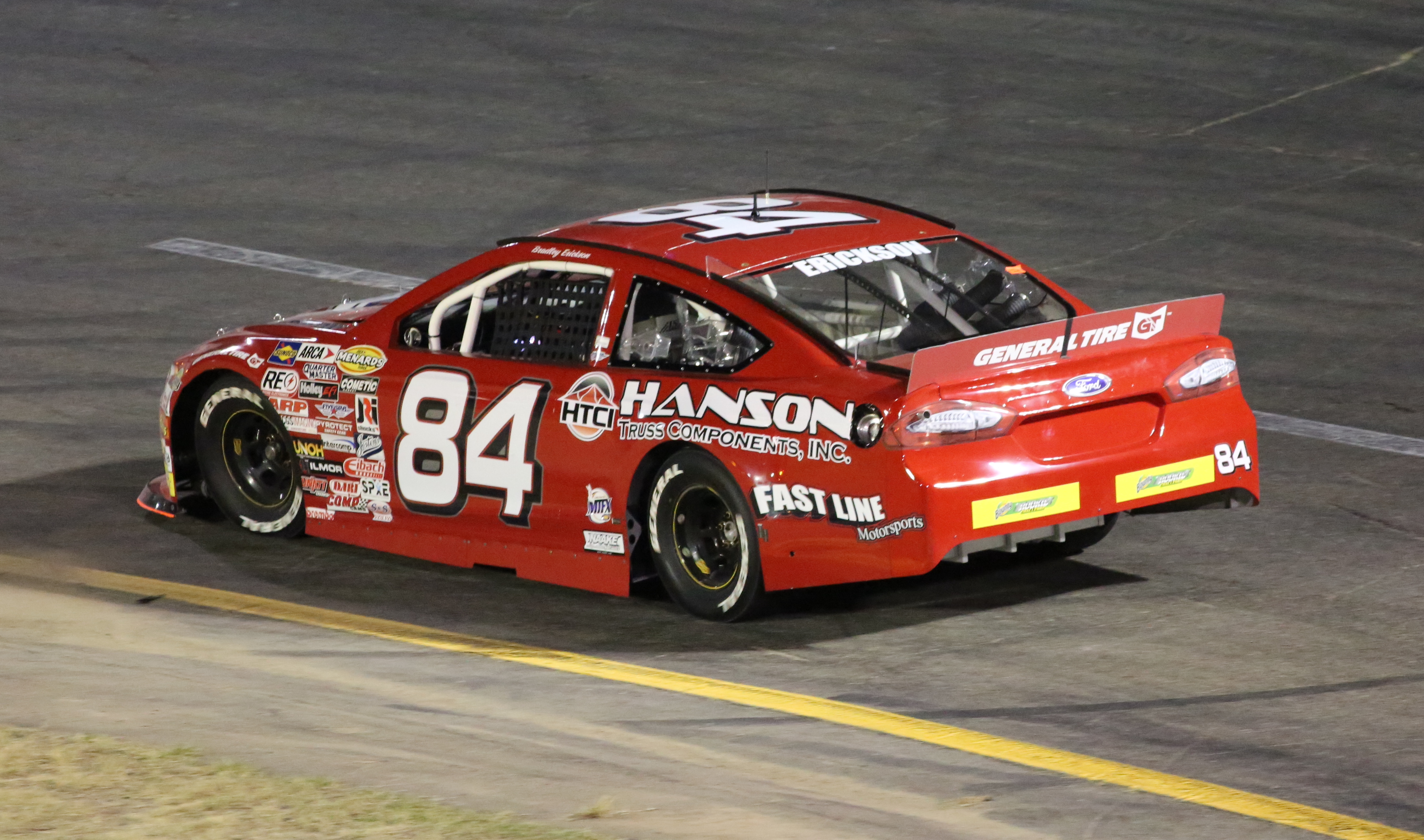
Erickson's No. 84 car at All American Speedway in 2022

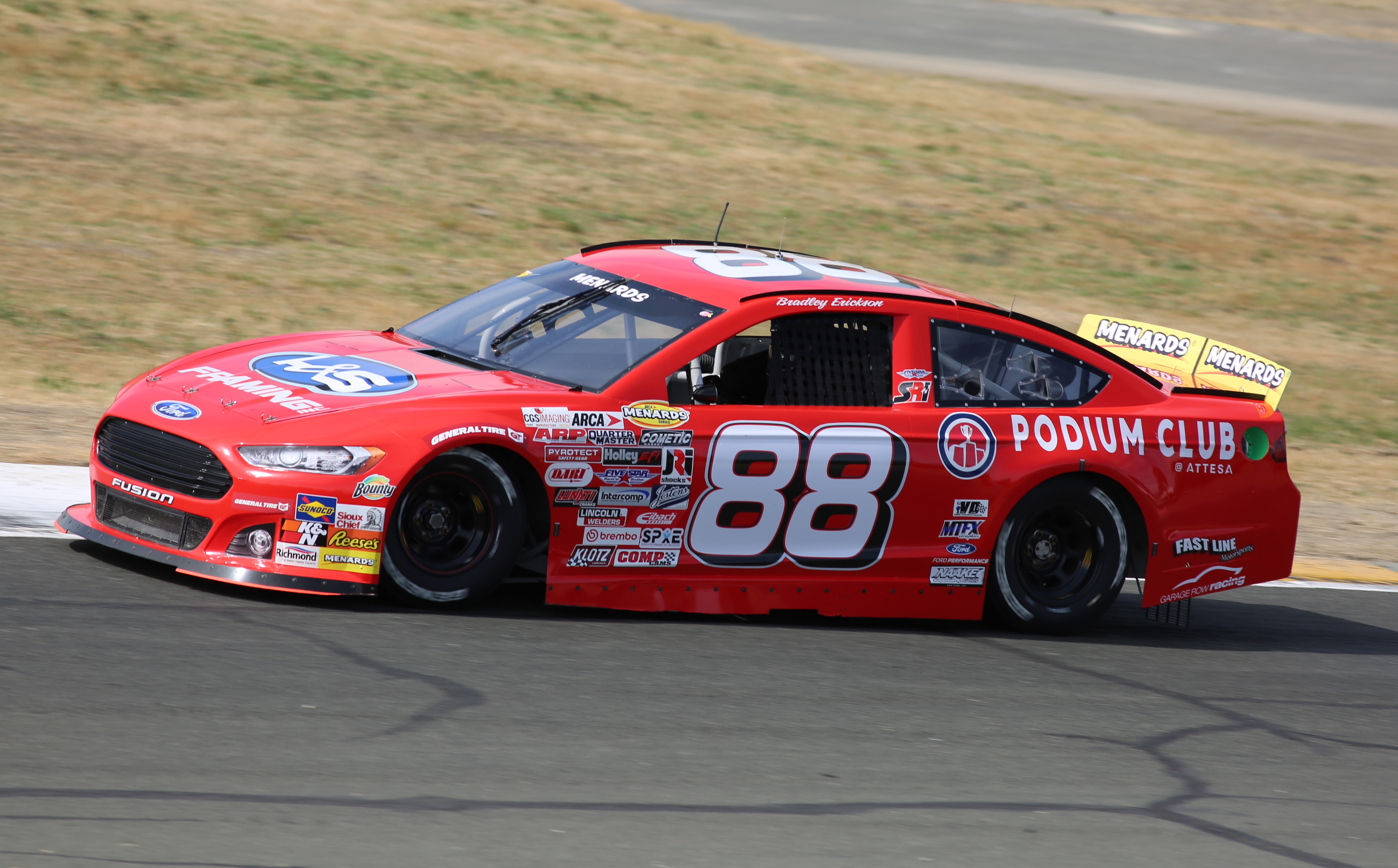
Erickson's No. 88 ARCA car at Sonoma in 2023

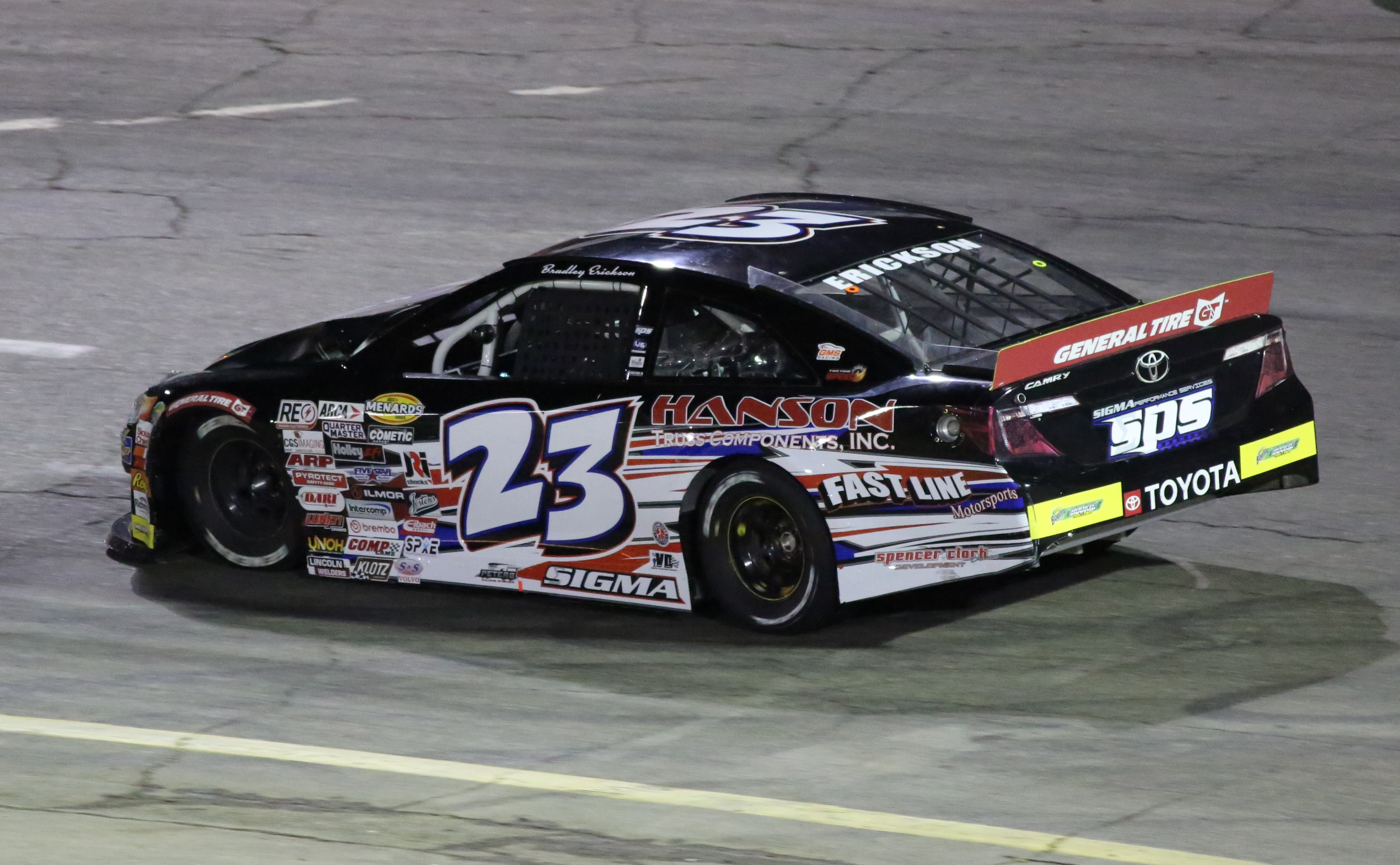
Erickson's No. 23 car at All American Speedway in 2023

At the age of five, Erickson began racing quarter midgets at South Mountain Speedway, before progressing to race at other racetracks outside of Arizona two years later. In 2014, he would win the QMA Western Grand Speed King Championship at the age of eight.

In 2019, Erickson would move to legends cars, getting a ride from Tucson Motorsports Inc. for the season; he would win five races en route to the championship. He would progress to the 51Fifty Jr. Late Model Series at Madera Speedway the following year, where he would win the championship after winning five races and four poles before running in late models categories like the SRL SPEARS Pro Late Model Series in 2021.

In 2022, Erickson would make his ARCA Menards Series West debut with Naake-Klauer Motorsports in the No. 84 Ford at Irwindale Speedway, where he would finish twentieth due to issues with the rear end of the car. He would run the last three races of the schedule soon after, earning back-to-back seventh-place finishes at the Las Vegas Motor Speedway Bullring and Phoenix Raceway.

In 2023, it was announced that Erickson would run full-time with Naake-Klauer Motorsports in the ARCA Menards Series West, this time in the No. 88 Ford. He would also making his debut in the main ARCA Menards Series at Phoenix, as that was companion event with the West Series; he would get his first top-five with a third-place finish. Before the race at All American Speedway, it was announced that Erickson would drive the No. 23 Toyota for the newly formed Sigma Performance Services for the remainder of the season, confirming his departure from Naake-Klauer. His seat at Naake-Klauer would be filled in by Joey Iest, who had previously drove full-time for the team from 2021 to 2022. Erickson finished the year fourth in the points standings, and has not raced since then.

== Personal life ==
Erickson is the grandson of Phil Erickson, a former competitor of the American Indycar Series, where he won one race at Dodge City Raceway Park. He is a former student at Desert Vista High School in Ahwatukee, Arizona.

== Motorsports career results ==
=== ARCA Menards Series ===
(key) (Bold – Pole position awarded by qualifying time. Italics – Pole position earned by points standings or practice time. * – Most laps led. ** – All laps led.)

ARCA Menards Series results
Year	Team	No.	Make	1	2	3	4	5	6	7	8	9	10	11	12	13	14	15	16	17	18	19	20	AMSC	Pts	Ref
2023	Naake-Klauer Motorsports	88	Ford	DAY	PHO; 3	TAL	KAN	CLT	BLN	ELK	MOH	IOW	POC	MCH	IRP	GLN	ISF	MLW	DSF	KAN	BRI	SLM	TOL	70th	41	

==== ARCA Menards Series West ====
ARCA Menards Series West results
Year	Team	No.	Make	1	2	3	4	5	6	7	8	9	10	11	12	AMSWC	Pts	Ref
2022	Naake-Klauer Motorsports	84	Ford	PHO	IRW	KCR	PIR	SON	IRW; 20	EVG	PIR	AAS; 12	LVS; 7	PHO; 7		17th	180	
2023	Naake-Klauer Motorsports	88	Ford	PHO; 3	IRW; 8	KCR; 5	PIR; 6	SON; 7	IRW; 13	SHA; 9	EVG; 9					4th	572	
2023	Sigma Performance Services	23	Toyota									AAS; 14	LVS; 21	MAD; 4		4th	572	
2023	Sigma Performance Services	23	Chevy												PHO; 7	4th	572	
