= Eric Nascimento =

American racing driver (born 2001)

- Nascimento at All American Speedway in 2026
- Born: Eric John Nascimento Jr. April 27, 2001 (age 25); Manteca, California, U.S.

ARCA Menards Series career
- 1 race run over 1 year
- ARCA no., team: No. 4 (Nascimento Motorsports)
- Best finish: 93rd (2023)
- First race: 2023 General Tire 150 (Phoenix)
Wins	Top tens	Poles
0	0	0

ARCA Menards Series West career
- 31 races run over 7 years
- Best finish: 7th (2023)
- First race: 2021 General Tire 200 (Sonoma)
- Last race: 2026 General Tire 150 (Sonoma)
Wins	Top tens	Poles
0	14	1
- Statistics up to date as of June 26, 2026.

Eric John "Bubba" Nascimento Jr. (born April 27, 2001) is an American professional stock car racing driver. He last competed part-time in the ARCA Menards Series West, driving the No. 4 Chevrolet for his own team, Nascimento Motorsports.

== Racing career ==
Nascimento first started racing in go-karts at the age of six at the Little Stockton 99 Kart track. He continued in karting until the age of fifteen, winning dozens of races and several championships. At eleven years old, he began competing in the SuperKarts USA Series, running for Buddy Rice Karting. He got a shot at racing for his family team, Nascimento Motorsports, at the age of fifteen when he first ran in a junior late model. He won at Madera Speedway in his fourth Jr Late Model start, passing Jesse Love in traffic in the closing laps. He also won his first non-TV Pro Late Model race at Madera Speedway, edging out Matt Erickson for the win in his first start.

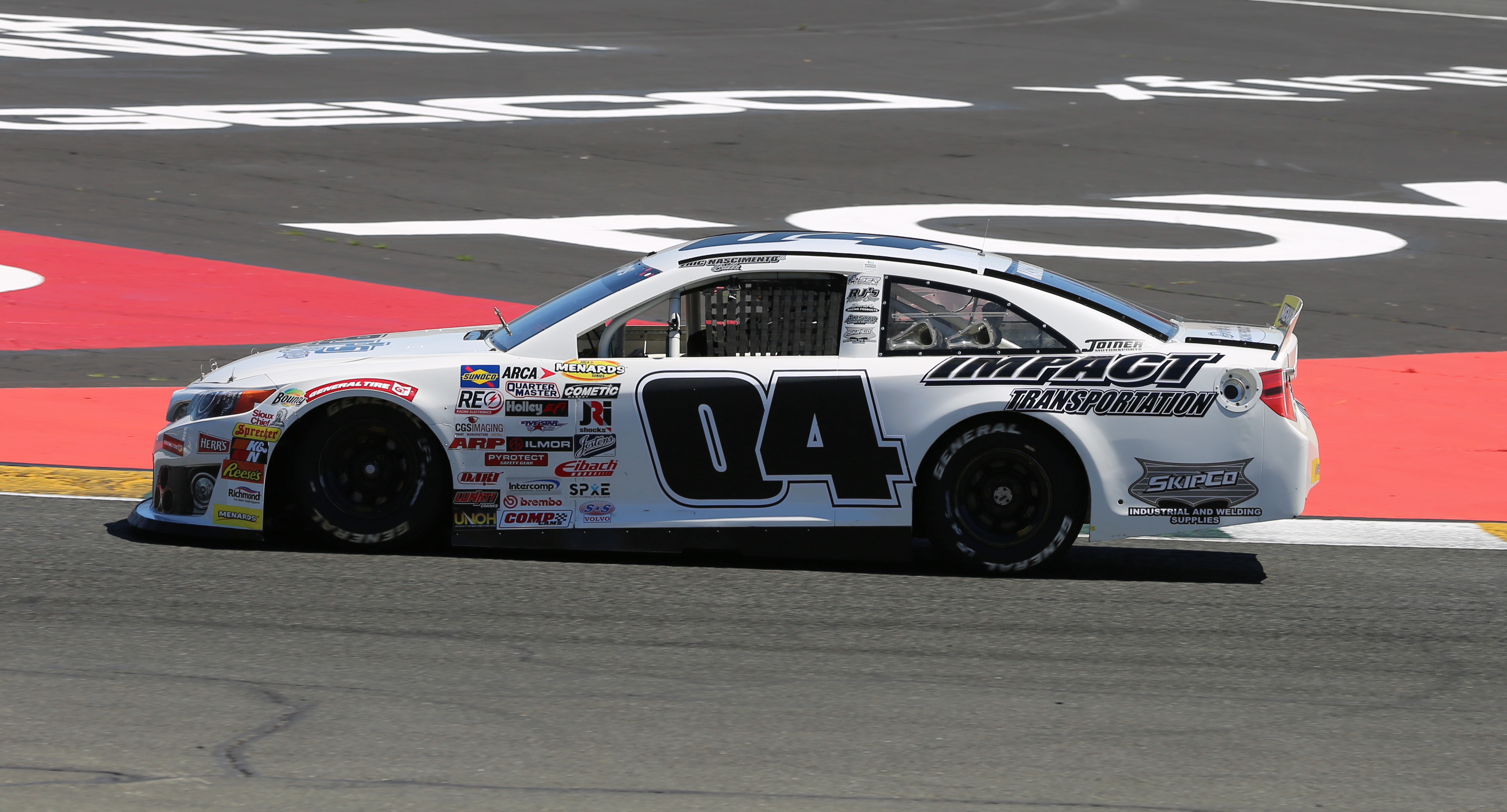
Nascimento's No. 04 car at Sonoma Raceway in 2022.

After a full-time campaign in that category, he progressed to pro late models, winning twice in the MAVTV Late Model Series at Madera Speedway in 2022 and 2023. He was also a Rookie of the Year contender in the SRL Super Late Model Series in 2019. In 2018 and 2019, he ran select races in the SRL Spears Southwest Tour Series.

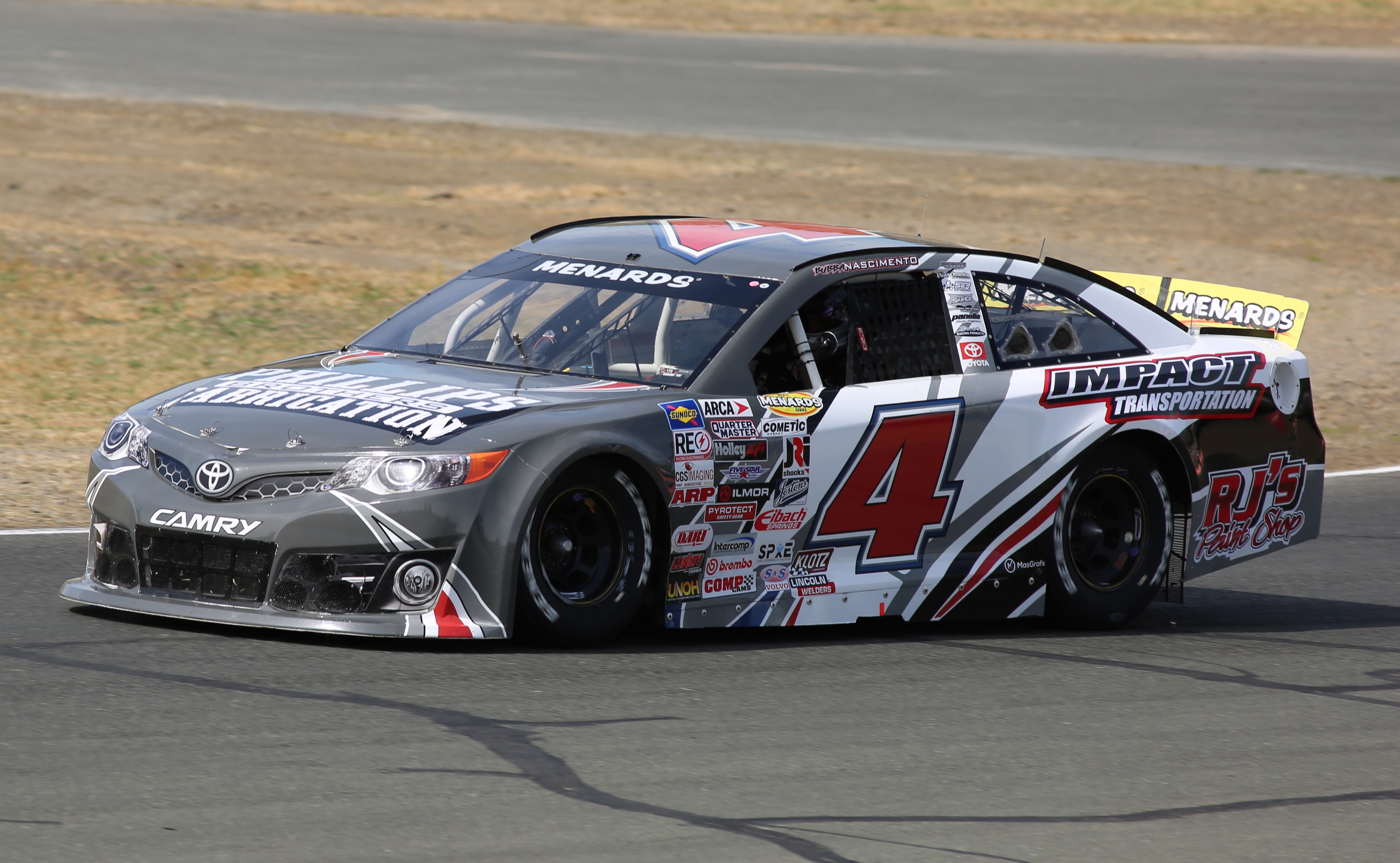
Nascimento's No. 4 ARCA car at Sonoma in 2023

In 2021, Nascimento made his ARCA Menards Series West debut at Sonoma Raceway, driving the No. 19 Toyota for Bill McAnally Racing after participating in tests conducted by the Bill McAnally Racing Drivers Academy. After starting seventh, he finished fourteenth due to a mechanical failure. He then ran multiple races during the rest of the year, driving for his own team in the No. 4 Toyota, and scored two top-tens, including a fifth place at Colorado National Speedway. Nascimento ran only two races at Sonoma and Portland International Raceway the following year.

In 2023, it was announced that he and his brother Ethan would run full-time in the West Series in the No. 4 and No. 04 respectively for Nascimento Motorsports.

== Personal life ==
Nascimento is the older brother of fellow driver Ethan Nascimento. Outside of racing, he works as an equipment manager at Impact Transportation LLC.

== Motorsports career results ==
=== ARCA Menards Series ===
(key) (Bold – Pole position awarded by qualifying time. Italics – Pole position earned by points standings or practice time. * – Most laps led. ** – All laps led.)

ARCA Menards Series results
Year	Team	No.	Make	1	2	3	4	5	6	7	8	9	10	11	12	13	14	15	16	17	18	19	20	AMSC	Pts	Ref
2023	Nascimento Motorsports	4	Chevy	DAY	PHO; 14	TAL	KAN	CLT	BLN	ELK	MOH	IOW	POC	MCH	IRP	GLN	ISF	MLW	DSF	KAN	BRI	SLM	TOL	93rd	30	

==== ARCA Menards Series West ====
ARCA Menards Series West results
Year	Team	No.	Make	1	2	3	4	5	6	7	8	9	10	11	12	13	AMSWC	Pts	Ref
2021	Bill McAnally Racing	19	Toyota	PHO	SON; 14	IRW											14th	182	
2021	Nascimento Motorsports	4	Toyota				CNS; 5	IRW; 9	PIR; 11	LVS; 11	AAS	PHO; 32					14th	182	
2022	Nascimento Motorsports	4	Toyota	PHO	IRW	KCR	PIR; 13										40th	68	
2022	Nascimento Motorsports	04	Toyota					SON; 7	IRW	EVG	PIR	AAS	LVS	PHO			40th	68	
2023	Nascimento Motorsports	4	Chevy	PHO; 14	IRW; 14				IRW; 2	SHA; 5	EVG; 5	AAS; 7	LVS; 5	**MAD**; 6	PHO; 19		7th	548	
2023	Nascimento Motorsports	4	Toyota			KCR; 15	PIR; 16	SON; 23									7th	548	
2024	Nascimento Motorsports	4	Chevy	PHO	KER; 6	PIR						MAD; 16	AAS; 2	KER; 17	PHO; 21		13th	230	
2024	Nascimento Motorsports	4	Toyota				SON; 22	IRW	IRW	SHA	TRI						13th	230	
2025	Nascimento Motorsports	4	Toyota	KER	PHO	TUC	CNS	KER	SON; 6	TRI	PIR						19th	107	
2025	Nascimento Motorsports	4	Chevy									AAS; 9	MAD; 10	LVS	PHO		19th	107	
2026	Nascimento Motorsports	4	Chevy	KER; 2	PHO	TUC	SHA	CNS	TRI								33rd	65	
2026	Nascimento Motorsports	4	Toyota							SON; 21	PIR	AAS	MAD	LVS	PHO	KER	33rd	65	
