= Mike Naake =

American racing driver and team owner

- Born: April 15, 1965 (age 61); Roseville, California, U.S.

ARCA Menards Series West career
- 3 races run over 2 years
- Best finish: 40th (1996)
- First race: 1996 Snap-On 200 (Colorado)
- Last race: 1997 Winston 200 (Altamont)
Wins	Top tens	Poles
0	0	0
- Statistics up to date as of November 16, 2024.

Mike Naake (born April 15, 1965) is an American former professional stock car racing driver and team owner who competed in the NASCAR Winston West Series from 1996 to 1997. He is also the co-owner of Naake-Klauer Motorsports, which currently competes in the ARCA Menards Series West.

Naake also previously competed in the NASCAR Southwest Series, the Pacific Challenge Series, and the Nor-Cal Best In The West Late Model Tour Series.

== Motorsports results ==
=== NASCAR ===
(key) (Bold - Pole position awarded by qualifying time. Italics - Pole position earned by points standings or practice time. * – Most laps led.)

==== Winston West Series ====
NASCAR Winston West Series results
Year	Team	No.	Make	1	2	3	4	5	6	7	8	9	10	11	12	13	14	15	NWWSC	Pts	Ref
1996	Joe Bean	0	Chevy	TUS	AMP	MMR	SON	MAD	POR	TUS	EVG	CNS; 18	MAD	MMR					40th	215	
1996	Jack Sellers	41	Chevy												SON; 19	MMR	PHO	LVS	40th	215	
1997	Jack Sellers	41	Chevy	TUS	AMP; 23	SON	TUS	MMR	LVS	CAL	EVG	POR	PPR	AMP	SON	MMR	LVS		71st	94	
