= 2024 West Coast Stock Car Motorsports Hall of Fame 150 (Irwindale) =

6th race of the 2024 ARCA Menards Series West

2024 West Coast Stock Car Motorsports Hall of Fame 150 presented by NAPA Auto Parts
Race details
- Race 6 of 12 in the 2024 ARCA Menards Series West season
- Date: July 6, 2024
- Location: Irwindale Speedway in Irwindale, California
- Course: Permanent racing facility
- Course length: 0.50 miles (0.80 km)
- Distance: 152 laps, 77 mi (122 km)
- Scheduled distance: 150 laps, 75 mi (120 km)
- Average speed: 60.625 mph (97.566 km/h)

Pole position
Driver	Nick Joanides	Jan's Towing Racing
- Time: 18.380

Most laps led
Driver	Trevor Huddleston	High Point Racing
- Laps: 62

Winner
No. 15	Sean Hingorani	Venturini Motorsports

Television in the United States
- Network: FloRacing
- Announcers: Charles Krall

Radio in the United States
- Radio: ARCA Racing Network

The 2024 West Coast Stock Car Motorsports Hall of Fame 150 presented by NAPA Auto Parts was the 6th stock car race of the 2024 ARCA Menards Series West season, and the 23rd iteration of the event. The race was held on Saturday, July 6, 2024, at Irwindale Speedway in Irwindale, California, a 0.50 mile (0.80 km) permanent asphalt oval shaped short track. The race was originally scheduled to be contested over 150 laps, but was extended to 152 laps due to an overtime finish. In an action-packed race with post-race controversy, Sean Hingorani, driving for Venturini Motorsports, would take advantage of late teammate troubles from Isabella Robusto, and take the lead with 29 laps to go. After surviving numerous restarts, Hingorani held off Jack Wood in a one-lap shootout to earn his sixth career ARCA Menards Series West win, his second of the season, and his second consecutive win, sweeping both doubleheader races. Robusto and Trevor Huddleston were the most dominant drivers of the race, Robusto led 58 laps while Huddleston led a race-high 62 laps. After hitting the wall with 29 laps to go, Robusto lost the lead and retired from the race with a flat tire, credited with a 17th place finish. To fill out the podium, Tyler Reif, driving for Central Coast Racing, would finish in 3rd, respectively.

The race was originally scheduled to be held on March 30, but was postponed until July 6 due to the impeding bad weather for the area. The race served as a doubleheader with the 2024 NAPA Auto Parts 150, which was held two days prior on July 4.

== Report ==
=== Background ===
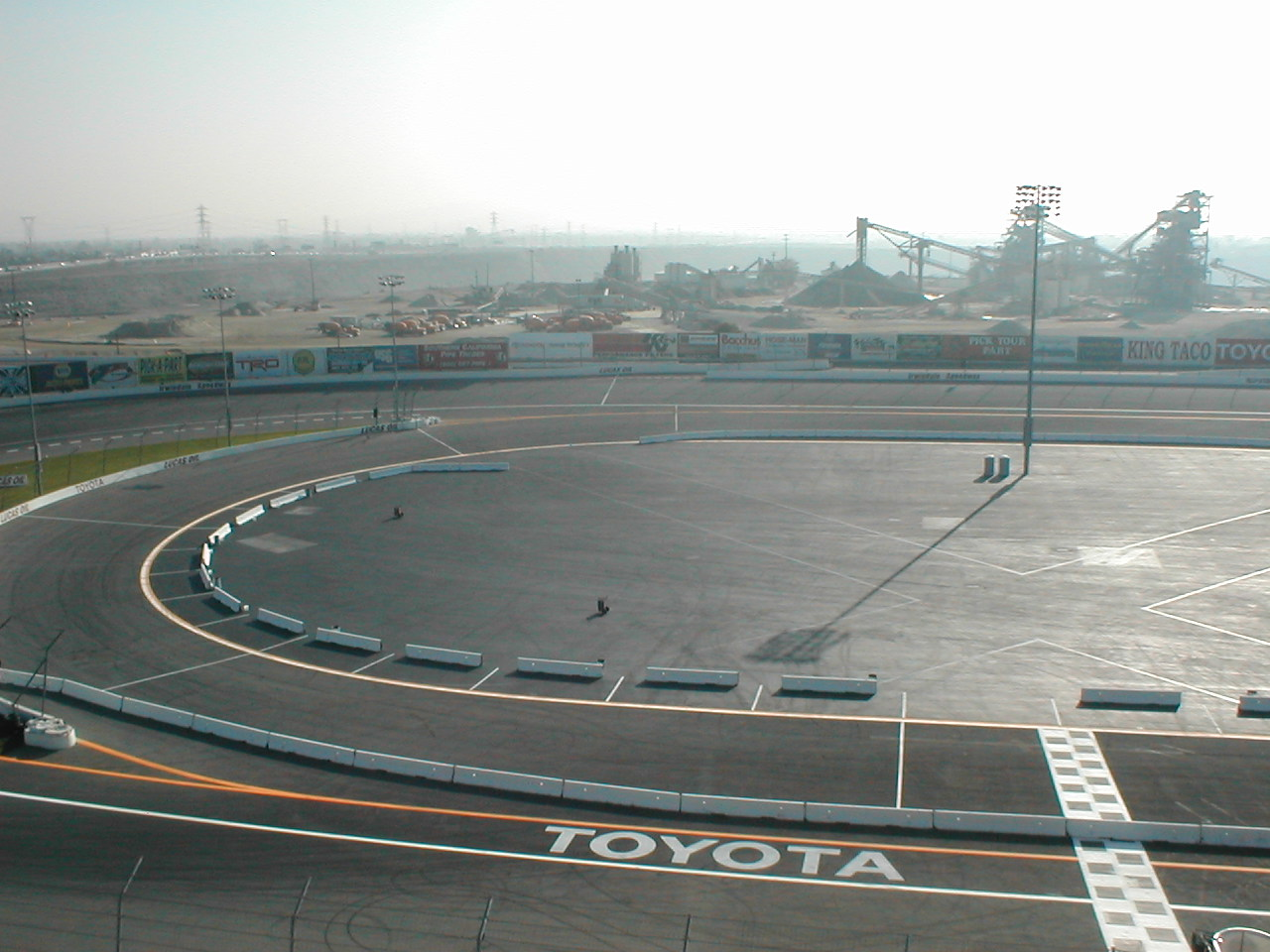
Irwindale Speedway, the circuit where the race was held.

The Irwindale Speedway & Event Center (a.k.a. Irwindale Speedway, Irwindale Dragstrip, or "The House of Drift") is a motorsports facility located in Irwindale, California, United States. It opened on March 27, 1999, under the official name Irwindale Speedway. Toyota purchased the naming rights to the facility in 2008, and from that time until 2011 it was also known as the Toyota Speedway at Irwindale.

The speedway features banked, paved 1/2- and 1/3-mile oval tracks and a 1/8-mile drag strip. The property is primarily used for NASCAR races such as ARCA Menards Series West and Whelen All-American Series events. In late 2011, NASCAR announced it was dropping Toyota Speedway from its schedule. The company that managed the track, Irwindale Speedway LLC, filed Chapter 7 bankruptcy on February 13, 2012.

==== Entry list ====
- (R) denotes rookie driver.

#	Driver	Team	Make	Sponsor
0	Tony Huffman	Fierce Creature Racing	Chevrolet	Camping World / First Impression Press
3	Todd Souza	Central Coast Racing	Toyota	Central Coast Cabinets
05	David Smith	Shockwave Motorsports	Toyota	Shockwave Marine Suspension Seating
5	Kole Raz	Jerry Pitts Racing	Toyota	Apache Rental Group
7	Takuma Koga	Jerry Pitts Racing	Toyota	IKEDO Archetype / CKB
9	Michael Killen	Jan's Towing Racing	Ford	Jan's Towing
11	Danica Dart (R)	Kennealy Keller Motorsports	Chevrolet	Evers Farms / Pioneer Performance
12	Kyle Keller	Kennealy Keller Motorsports	Ford	Setting The Stage / Battle Born
13	Tyler Reif	Central Coast Racing	Toyota	Central Coast Cabinets
15	Sean Hingorani	Venturini Motorsports	Toyota	Fidelity Capital
16	Jack Wood	Bill McAnally Racing	Chevrolet	NAPA Auto Care
19	Eric Johnson Jr. (R)	Bill McAnally Racing	Chevrolet	Pacific Office Automation
20	Jake Finch	Venturini Motorsports	Toyota	Phoenix Construction
23	Jaron Giannini	Sigma Performance Services	Chevrolet	Versatile / SPS / GMS Fabrication
27	Bobby Hillis Jr.	Fierce Creature Racing	Chevrolet	Camping World / First Impression Press
31	Rick Goodale	Rise Motorsports	Chevrolet	Nor-Cal Battery Company
50	Trevor Huddleston	High Point Racing	Ford	High Point Racing / Racecar Factory
55	Isabella Robusto	Venturini Motorsports	Toyota	Yahoo!
71	Nick Joanides	Jan's Towing Racing	Ford	Jan's Towing
77	Garrett Zacharias	Performance P–1 Motorsports	Toyota	King Taco / REX MD / Wallace Sign
Official entry list

== Practice ==
The first and only practice session was held on Saturday, July 6, at 3:30 PM PST, and would last for 1 hour. Nick Joanides, driving for Jan's Towing Racing, would set the fastest time in the session, with a lap of 18.510, and a speed of 97.245 mph (156.501 km/h).

=== Practice results ===
Pos.	#	Driver	Team	Make	Time	Speed
1	71	Nick Joanides	Jan's Towing Racing	Ford	18.510	97.245
2	13	Tyler Reif	Central Coast Racing	Toyota	18.633	96.603
3	50	Trevor Huddleston	High Point Racing	Ford	18.641	96.561
Full practice results

== Qualifying ==
Qualifying was held on Saturday, July 6, at 5:00 PM PST. The qualifying system used is a multi-car, multi-lap based system. All drivers will be on track for a 20-minute timed session, and whoever sets the fastest time in the session will win the pole.

Nick Joanides, driving for Jan's Towing Racing, would score the pole for the race, with a lap of 18.380, and a speed of 97.933 mph (157.608 km/h).

One driver withdrew from the race: Robbie Kennealy.

=== Qualifying results ===
Pos.	#	Driver	Team	Make	Time	Speed
1	71	Nick Joanides	Jan's Towing Racing	Ford	18.380	97.933
2	13	Tyler Reif	Central Coast Racing	Toyota	18.400	97.826
3	55	Isabella Robusto	Venturini Motorsports	Toyota	18.461	97.503
4	15	Sean Hingorani	Venturini Motorsports	Toyota	18.470	97.455
5	50	Trevor Huddleston	High Point Racing	Ford	18.494	97.329
6	20	Jake Finch	Venturini Motorsports	Toyota	18.500	97.297
7	5	Kole Raz	Jerry Pitts Racing	Toyota	18.518	97.203
8	16	Jack Wood	Bill McAnally Racing	Chevrolet	18.626	96.639
9	23	Jaron Giannini	Sigma Performance Services	Chevrolet	18.628	96.629
10	3	Todd Souza	Central Coast Racing	Toyota	18.708	96.216
11	12	Kyle Keller	Kennealy Keller Motorsports	Ford	18.744	96.031
12	19	Eric Johnson Jr. (R)	Bill McAnally Racing	Chevrolet	18.789	95.801
13	77	Garrett Zacharias	Performance P–1 Motorsports	Toyota	19.179	93.853
14	7	Takuma Koga	Jerry Pitts Racing	Toyota	19.268	93.419
15	9	Michael Killen	Jan's Towing Racing	Ford	19.481	92.398
16	11	Danica Dart (R)	Kennealy Keller Motorsports	Chevrolet	19.549	92.076
17	05	David Smith	Shockwave Motorsports	Toyota	20.079	89.646
18	27	Bobby Hillis Jr.	Fierce Creature Racing	Chevrolet	20.935	85.980
19	31	Rick Goodale	Rise Motorsports	Chevrolet	21.087	85.361
Withdrew
	1	Robbie Kennealy (R)	Kennealy Keller Motorsports	Ford		
Official qualifying results

== Post race conflict ==
Following the end of the race, conflict broke out between the PA announcer and the Irwindale Speedway track owner, Tim Huddleston (also the father of driver Trevor Huddleston), and crew members of Venturini Motorsports. As Hingorani did a burnout to celebrate, Huddleston stated that "This race is under review. They might take it away from him. Cause he jumped the start, so NASCAR is trying to figure out what happened here." Shortly after, ARCA officials confirmed that Hingorani was the winner of the race. As Hingorani began celebrating by climbing the catchfence, tensions began to rise. "They made the decision. Picking it up tonight. Climbing the fence. Hey, fuck you buddy" Huddleston had shouted into the hot mic. Shortly after, the mic ended up getting cut off before Huddleston went over to interview second-place finisher Jack Wood. "P2 tonight. What a gentleman. Class act. Ladies and Gentleman, they're so disrespectful, I'm not interviewing them. They don't need it." Afterwards, Huddleston jokingly said that Wood was the winner of the race. After interviewing third-place driver Tyler Reif, the broadcast went back to Hingorani, but wrapped up shortly after and Hingorani did not receive a victory interview on the broadcast.

== Race results ==
Fin	St	#	Driver	Team	Make	Laps	Led	Status	Pts
1	4	15	Sean Hingorani	Venturini Motorsports	Toyota	152	31	Running	47
2	8	16	Jack Wood	Bill McAnally Racing	Chevrolet	152	0	Running	42
3	2	13	Tyler Reif	Central Coast Racing	Toyota	152	1	Running	42
4	1	71	Nick Joanides	Jan's Towing Racing	Ford	152	0	Running	42
5	9	23	Jaron Giannini	Sigma Performance Services	Chevrolet	152	0	Running	39
6	7	5	Kole Raz	Jerry Pitts Racing	Toyota	152	0	Running	38
7	10	3	Todd Souza	Central Coast Racing	Toyota	150	0	Running	37
8	6	20	Jake Finch	Venturini Motorsports	Toyota	152	0	Running	36
9	5	50	Trevor Huddleston	High Point Racing	Ford	152	62	Running	37
10	12	19	Eric Johnson Jr. (R)	Bill McAnally Racing	Chevrolet	151	0	Running	34
11	11	12	Kyle Keller	Kennealy Keller Motorsports	Ford	150	0	Running	33
12	15	9	Michael Killen	Jan's Towing Racing	Ford	150	0	Running	32
13	14	7	Takuma Koga	Jerry Pitts Racing	Toyota	147	0	Running	31
14	16	11	Danica Dart (R)	Kennealy Keller Motorsports	Chevrolet	147	0	Running	30
15	17	05	David Smith	Shockwave Motorsports	Toyota	143	0	Running	29
16	19	31	Rick Goodale	Rise Motorsports	Chevrolet	138	0	Running	28
17	3	55	Isabella Robusto	Venturini Motorsports	Toyota	121	58	Flat Tire	28
18	13	77	Garrett Zacharias	Performance P–1 Motorsports	Toyota	9	0	Accident	26
19	18	27	Bobby Hillis Jr.	Fierce Creature Racing	Chevrolet	4	0	Electrical	25
Withdrew
		1	Robbie Kennealy (R)	Kennealy Keller Motorsports	Ford				
Official race results

== Standings after the race ==
Drivers' Championship standings

	Pos	Driver	Points
	1	Sean Hingorani	293
1	2	Tyler Reif	290 (-3)
1	3	Jack Wood	264 (–29)
1	4	Trevor Huddleston	258 (–35)
	5	Kyle Keller	253 (–40)
2	6	Nick Joanides	240 (–53)
1	7	Eric Johnson Jr.	237 (–56)
1	8	Takuma Koga	231 (–62)
	9	Todd Souza	218 (–75)
1	10	David Smith	199 (–94)

- Note: Only the first 10 positions are included for the driver standings.

Previous race: 2024 NAPA Auto Parts 150 (Irwindale)	ARCA Menards Series West; 2024 season	Next race: 2024 Shasta 150
