= 2024 NAPA Auto Parts 150 (Roseville) =

10th race of the 2024 ARCA Menards Series West

2024 NAPA Auto Parts 150 presented by Berco Redwood
Race details
- Race 10 of 12 in the 2024 ARCA Menards Series West season
- Date: October 5, 2024
- Location: All American Speedway in Roseville, California
- Course: Permanent racing facility
- Course length: 0.333 miles (0.536 km)
- Distance: 150 laps, 50 mi (80 km)
- Scheduled distance: 150 laps, 50 mi (80 km)
- Average speed: 80.854 mph (130.122 km/h)

Pole position
Driver	Trevor Huddleston	High Point Racing
- Time: 13.761

Most laps led
Driver	Trevor Huddleston	High Point Racing
- Laps: 150

Winner
No. 50	Trevor Huddleston	High Point Racing

Television in the United States
- Network: FloRacing
- Announcers: Charles Krall

Radio in the United States
- Radio: ARCA Racing Network

The 2024 NAPA Auto Parts 150 presented by Berco Redwood was the 10th stock car race of the 2024 ARCA Menards Series West season, and the 17th iteration of the event. The race was held on Saturday, October 5, 2024, at the All American Speedway in Roseville, California, a 0.333 mile (0.536 km) permanent oval shaped racetrack. The race took the scheduled 150 laps to complete. In a caution-free race, Trevor Huddleston, driving for High Point Racing, would lead flag-to-flag, leading every lap of the race from the pole to earn his fifth career ARCA Menards Series West win, his second of the season, and his second consecutive win. To fill out the podium, Eric Nascimento, driving for Nascimento Motorsports, and Tyler Reif, driving for Central Coast Racing, would finish 2nd and 3rd, respectively.

== Report ==
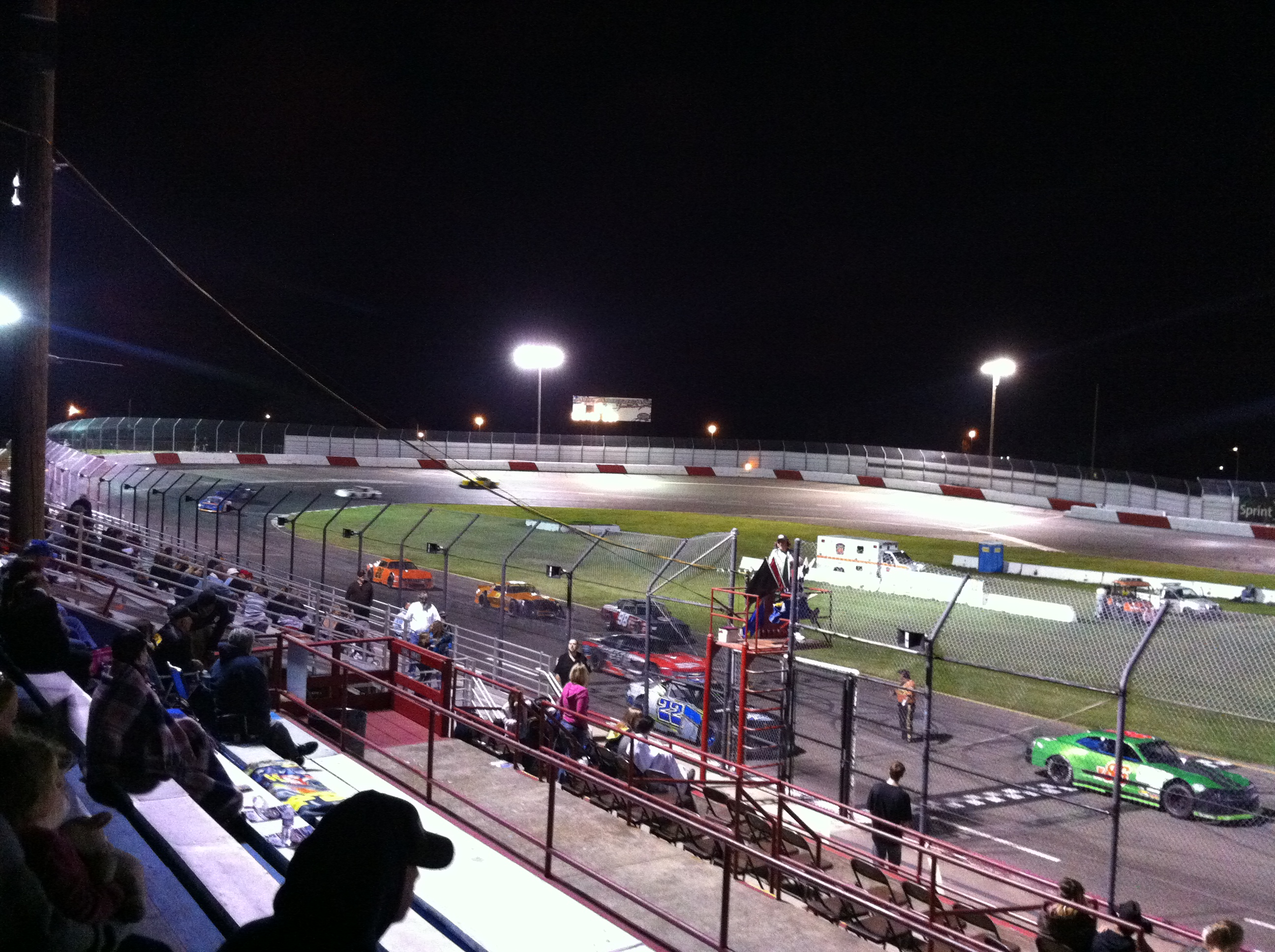
All American Speedway, the circuit where the race was held.

All American Speedway is a 1/3-mile NASCAR-sanctioned paved oval racetrack located in Roseville, California.

The track first began operations in 1954. The track was originally a quarter mile long, but was renovated before the 2008 racing season to its current length of one third of a mile.

Between the years 1977 and 1982, five NASCAR Winston Grand National West Series events were held at the track. Since the renovation prior to the 2008 season, sixteen more ARCA Menards Series West races have been held at the track. The venue also hosts an annual round of the SRL Southwest Tour.

=== Entry list ===
- (R) denotes rookie driver.

#	Driver	Team	Make	Sponsor
3	Kyle Keller	Central Coast Racing	Toyota	Central Coast Cabinets
4	Eric Nascimento	Nascimento Motorsports	Chevrolet	Impact Transportation / RJs Paintshop
05	David Smith	Shockwave Motorsports	Toyota	Shockwave Marine Suspension Seating
5	Sean Hingorani	Jerry Pitts Racing	Toyota	Fidelity Capital
6	Henry Barton	Jerry Pitts Racing	Toyota	Turn One io
7	Takuma Koga	Jerry Pitts Racing	Toyota	Yamada
9	Michael Killen	Jan's Towing Racing	Ford	Jan's Towing
12	Joey Kennealy	Kennealy Keller Motorsports	Chevrolet	STS / American Swim Academy
13	Tyler Reif	Central Coast Racing	Toyota	Central Coast Cabinets
16	Jack Wood	Bill McAnally Racing	Chevrolet	NAPA Auto Care
19	Eric Johnson Jr. (R)	Bill McAnally Racing	Chevrolet	Pacific Office Automation
21	Ethan Nascimento	Nascimento Motorsports	Toyota	Impact Transportation / Joiner / Nascimento
23	Jaron Giannini	Sigma Performance Services	Toyota	Versatile & Stone / SPS / GMS Fabrication
50	Trevor Huddleston	High Point Racing	Ford	High Point Racing / Racecar Factory
71	Rip Michels	Jan's Towing Racing	Ford	Jan's Towing
Official entry list

== Practice ==
The first and only practice session was held on Saturday, October 5, at 3:00 PM PST, and would last for 1 hour. Tyler Reif, driving for Central Coast Racing, would set the fastest time in the session, with a lap of 13.764, and a speed of 87.097 mph (140.169 km/h).

Pos.	#	Driver	Team	Make	Time	Speed
1	13	Tyler Reif	Central Coast Racing	Toyota	13.764	87.097
2	16	Jack Wood	Bill McAnally Racing	Chevrolet	13.832	86.669
3	50	Trevor Huddleston	High Point Racing	Ford	13.863	86.475
Full practice results

== Qualifying ==
Qualifying was held on Saturday, October 5, at 4:20 PM PST. The qualifying system used is a single-car, two-lap based system. Drivers will be on track by themselves and will have two laps to post a qualifying time, and whoever sets the fastest time will win the pole.

Trevor Huddleston, driving for High Point Racing, would score the pole for the race, with a lap of 13.761, and a speed of 87.116 mph (140.200 km/h).

=== Qualifying results ===
Pos.	#	Driver	Team	Make	Time	Speed
1	50	Trevor Huddleston	High Point Racing	Ford	13.761	87.116
2	13	Tyler Reif	Central Coast Racing	Toyota	13.810	86.807
3	4	Eric Nascimento	Nascimento Motorsports	Chevrolet	13.811	86.800
4	6	Henry Barton	Jerry Pitts Racing	Toyota	13.813	86.788
5	16	Jack Wood	Bill McAnally Racing	Chevrolet	13.824	86.719
6	23	Jaron Giannini	Sigma Performance Services	Toyota	13.832	86.669
7	5	Sean Hingorani	Jerry Pitts Racing	Toyota	13.896	86.269
8	3	Kyle Keller	Central Coast Racing	Toyota	13.900	86.245
9	71	Rip Michels	Jan's Towing Racing	Ford	13.961	85.868
10	21	Ethan Nascimento	Nascimento Motorsports	Toyota	13.979	85.757
11	12	Joey Kennealy	Kennealy Keller Motorsports	Chevrolet	14.023	85.488
12	7	Takuma Koga	Jerry Pitts Racing	Toyota	14.056	85.287
13	19	Eric Johnson Jr. (R)	Bill McAnally Racing	Chevrolet	14.062	85.251
14	9	Michael Killen	Jan's Towing Racing	Ford	14.197	84.440
15	05	David Smith	Shockwave Motorsports	Toyota	14.536	82.471
Official qualifying results

== Race results ==
Fin	St	#	Driver	Team	Make	Laps	Led	Status	Pts
1	1	50	Trevor Huddleston	High Point Racing	Ford	150	150	Running	99
2	3	4	Eric Nascimento	Nascimento Motorsports	Chevrolet	150	0	Running	42
3	2	13	Tyler Reif	Central Coast Racing	Toyota	150	0	Running	91
4	7	5	Sean Hingorani	Jerry Pitts Racing	Toyota	150	0	Running	90
5	5	16	Jack Wood	Bill McAnally Racing	Chevrolet	150	0	Running	89
6	10	21	Ethan Nascimento	Nascimento Motorsports	Toyota	150	0	Running	38
7	6	23	Jaron Giannini	Sigma Performance Services	Toyota	149	0	Running	37
8	13	19	Eric Johnson Jr. (R)	Bill McAnally Racing	Chevrolet	149	0	Running	86
9	4	6	Henry Barton	Jerry Pitts Racing	Toyota	149	0	Running	35
10	8	3	Kyle Keller	Central Coast Racing	Toyota	149	0	Running	84
11	11	12	Joey Kennealy	Kennealy Keller Motorsports	Chevrolet	148	0	Running	33
12	12	7	Takuma Koga	Jerry Pitts Racing	Toyota	148	0	Running	82
13	14	9	Michael Killen	Jan's Racing	Ford	147	0	Running	31
14	9	71	Rip Michels	Jan's Racing	Ford	143	0	Running	30
15	15	05	David Smith	Shockwave Motorsports	Toyota	136	0	Running	79
Official race results

== Standings after the race ==
Drivers' Championship standings

	Pos	Driver	Points
	1	Sean Hingorani	512
	2	Tyler Reif	508 (-4)
	3	Trevor Huddleston	485 (–27)
	4	Jack Wood	464 (–48)
	5	Kyle Keller	454 (–58)
	6	Eric Johnson Jr.	426 (–86)
	7	Takuma Koga	418 (–94)
2	8	David Smith	372 (–140)
1	9	Todd Souza	328 (–184)
2	10	Nick Joanides	310 (–202)

- Note: Only the first 10 positions are included for the driver standings.

Previous race: 2024 West Coast Stock Car Motorsports Hall of Fame 150 (Madera)	ARCA Menards Series West; 2024 season	Next race: 2024 NAPA Auto Parts 150 (Kern Raceway)
