= 2024 West Coast Stock Car Motorsports Hall of Fame 150 (Madera) =

9th race of the 2024 ARCA Menards Series West

Race details
- Race 9 of 12 in the 2024 ARCA Menards Series West season
- Date: September 28, 2024
- Location: Madera Speedway in Madera, California
- Course: Permanent racing facility
- Course length: 0.333 miles (0.536 km)
- Scheduled distance: 150 laps, 50 mi (80 km)

Pole position
Driver	Jaron Giannini	JSigma Performance Services
- Time: 14.696

Most laps led

Winner
No. 50	Trevor Huddleston	High Point Racing

Television in the United States
- Network: FloRacing
- Announcers: Charles Krall

Radio in the United States
- Radio: ARCA Racing Network

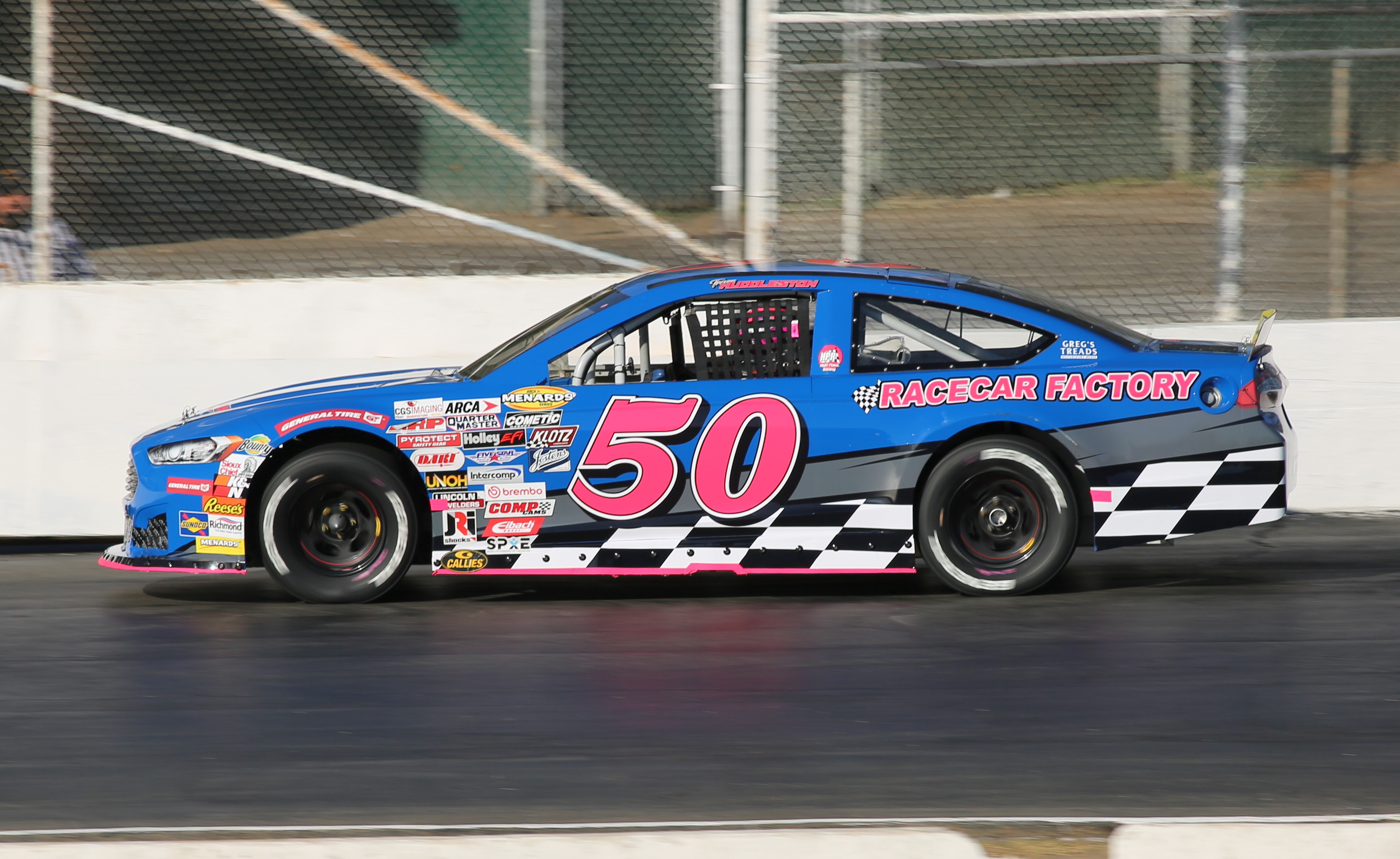
Trevor Huddleston - the eventual winner of the West Coast Stock Car Motorsports Hall of Fame 150 at Madera Speedway in 2024.

The 2024 West Coast Stock Car Motorsports Hall of Fame 150 was the 9th stock car race of the 2024 ARCA Menards Series West season, and the 2nd iteration of the event. The race was held on Saturday, September 28, 2024, at Madera Speedway in Madera, California, a 0.333 mile (0.536 km) permanent oval shaped short track. The race was scheduled to be contested over 150 laps, but was extended to 153 due to an overtime finish. Trevor Huddleston, driving for High Point Racing, would pass Sean Hingorani with one lap to go to get the win. To fill out the podium, Hingorani, driving for Jerry Pitts Racing, and Ethan Nascimento, driving for Nascimento Motorsports, would finish 2nd and 3rd, respectively.

After the race, Huddleston proposed to his girlfriend during his post race interview.

== Report ==
Madera Speedway is a 0.333 mile (0.536 km) oval race track located in Madera, California. It was built in 1971 and currently hosts the 51FIFTY Jr. Late Model Series and the Nut Up Pro Late Model Series. In 2023, the track began hosting the ARCA Menards Series West, with the inaugural race being held on October 21. The track returned for the 2024 season.

=== Entry list ===
- (R) denotes rookie driver.

#	Driver	Team	Make	Sponsor
3	Todd Souza	Central Coast Racing	Toyota	Central Coast Cabinets
4	Eric Nascimento	Nascimento Motorsports	Chevrolet	Impact Transportation / Joiner / Nascimento
05	David Smith	Shockwave Motorsports	Toyota	Shockwave Marine Suspension Seating
5	Sean Hingorani	Jerry Pitts Racing	Toyota	Fidelity Capital
6	Henry Barton	Jerry Pitts Racing	Toyota	Turn One io
7	Takuma Koga	Jerry Pitts Racing	Toyota	GR Garage
9	Michael Killen	Jan's Towing Racing	Ford	Jan's Towing
11	Robbie Kennealy (R)	Kennealy Keller Motorsports	Chevrolet	American Swim Academy / STS / Coverease
12	Kyle Keller	Kennealy Keller Motorsports	Ford	Las Vegas Rentals / Arbus / Battle Born
13	Tyler Reif	Central Coast Racing	Toyota	Central Coast Cabinets
16	Jack Wood	Bill McAnally Racing	Chevrolet	NAPA Auto Care
19	Eric Johnson Jr. (R)	Bill McAnally Racing	Chevrolet	Pacific Office Automation
21	Ethan Nascimento	Nascimento Motorsports	Toyota	Impact Transportation / Joiner / Nascimento
23	Jaron Giannini	Sigma Performance Services	Toyota	Versatile & Stone / SPS / GMS Fabrication
50	Trevor Huddleston	High Point Racing	Ford	High Point Racing / Racecar Factory
71	Rip Michels	Jan's Towing Racing	Ford	Jan's Towing
77	Kyle Whisner	Performance P–1 Motorsports	Toyota	King Taco / Victory Junction
Official entry list

== Practice ==
The first and only practice session was held on Saturday, September 28, at 2:30 PM PST, and would last for 1 hour. Jack Wood, driving for Bill McAnally Racing, would set the fastest time in the session, with a lap of 14.801, and a speed of 80.995 mph (130.349 km/h).

Pos.	#	Driver	Team	Make	Time	Speed
1	16	Jack Wood	Bill McAnally Racing	Chevrolet	14.801	80.995
2	23	Jaron Giannini	Sigma Performance Services	Toyota	14.814	80.923
3	50	Trevor Huddleston	High Point Racing	Ford	14.843	80.765
Full practice results

== Qualifying ==
Qualifying was held on Saturday, September 28, at 4:30 PM PST. The qualifying system used is a single-car, two-lap system with only one round. Drivers will be on track by themselves and will have two laps to post a qualifying time, and whoever sets the fastest time will win the pole.

Jaron Giannini, driving for Sigma Performance Services, would score the pole for the race, with a lap of 14.696, and a speed of 81.573 mph (131.279 km/h).

=== Qualifying results ===
Pos.	#	Driver	Team	Make	Time	Speed
1	23	Jaron Giannini	Sigma Performance Services	Toyota	14.696	81.573
2	50	Trevor Huddleston	High Point Racing	Ford	14.701	81.545
3	13	Tyler Reif	Central Coast Racing	Toyota	14.747	81.291
4	5	Sean Hingorani	Jerry Pitts Racing	Toyota	14.777	81.126
5	16	Jack Wood	Bill McAnally Racing	Chevrolet	14.794	81.033
6	4	Eric Nascimento	Nascimento Motorsports	Chevrolet	14.811	80.940
7	21	Ethan Nascimento	Nascimento Motorsports	Toyota	14.837	80.798
8	12	Kyle Keller	Kennealy Keller Motorsports	Ford	14.845	80.754
9	6	Henry Barton	Jerry Pitts Racing	Toyota	14.895	80.483
10	71	Rip Michels	Jan's Towing Racing	Ford	14.924	80.327
11	3	Todd Souza	Central Coast Racing	Toyota	15.167	79.040
12	7	Takuma Koga	Jerry Pitts Racing	Toyota	15.185	78.946
13	9	Michael Killen	Jan's Towing Racing	Ford	15.225	78.739
14	11	Robbie Kennealy (R)	Kennealy Keller Motorsports	Chevrolet	15.608	76.807
15	77	Kyle Whisner	Performance P–1 Motorsports	Toyota	15.896	75.415
16	05	David Smith	Shockwave Motorsports	Toyota	16.076	74.571
17	19	Eric Johnson Jr. (R)	Bill McAnally Racing	Chevrolet	–	–
Official qualifying results

== Race results ==
Fin	St	#	Driver	Team	Make	Laps	Led	Status	Pts
1	2	50	Trevor Huddleston	High Point Racing	Ford	153		Running	
2	4	5	Sean Hingorani	Jerry Pitts Racing	Toyota	153		Running	
3	7	21	Ethan Nascimento	Nascimento Motorsports	Chevrolet	153		Running	
4	17	19	Eric Johnson Jr. (R)	Bill McAnally Racing	Chevrolet	153		Running	
5	8	12	Kyle Keller	Kennealy Keller Motorsports	Ford	153		Running	
6	1	23	Jaron Giannini	Sigma Performance Racing	Toyota	153		Running	
7	12	7	Takuma Koga	Jerry Pitts Racing	Toyota	153		Running	
8	9	6	Henry Barton	Jerry Pitts Racing	Toyota	153		Running	
9	10	71	Rip Michels	Jan's Racing	Ford	153		Running	
10	13	9	Michael Killen	Jan's Racing	Ford	152		Running	
11	11	3	Todd Souza	Central Coast Racing	Toyota	152		Running	
12	5	16	Jack Wood	Bill McAnally Racing	Chevrolet	150		Running	
13	16	05	David Smith	Shockwave Motorsports	Toyota	147		Running	
14	3	13	Tyler Reif	Central Coast Racing	Toyota	107		Accident	
15	15	77	Kyle Whisner	Performance P–1 Motorsports	Toyota	98		Accident	
16	6	4	Eric Nascimento	Nascimento Motorsports	Chevrolet	21		Accident	
17	14	11	Robbie Kennealy (R)	Kennealy Keller Motorsports	Chevrolet	4		Accident	
Official race results

== Standings after the race ==
Drivers' Championship standings

	Pos	Driver	Points
1	1	Sean Hingorani	422
1	2	Tyler Reif	417 (-5)
1	3	Trevor Huddleston	385 (–37)
1	4	Jack Wood	375 (–47)
	5	Kyle Keller	370 (–52)
1	6	Eric Johnson Jr.	340 (–82)
1	7	Takuma Koga	336 (–86)
1	8	Todd Souza	328 (–94)
3	9	Nick Joanides	310 (–112)
	10	David Smith	293 (–129)

- Note: Only the first 10 positions are included for the driver standings.

Previous race: 2024 NAPA Auto Care 150	ARCA Menards Series West; 2024 season	Next race: 2024 NAPA Auto Parts 150 (Roseville)
