= ARCA races at Madera =

Annual stock car race in California, U.S.

Madera 150
ARCA Menards Series West
- Venue: Madera Speedway
- Location: Madera, California; United States
- First race: 1973
- Distance: 50 mi (80 km)
- Laps: 150
- Previous names: Madera 100 (1973); Budweiser 200; Quick-N-Ez 200 (1995); Imperial Palace / Race Stuff 200 (1996); NAPA 150 by NAPA Belts & Hose/Madera Auto CTR (2003); NAPA Auto Parts / Toyota 150 (2009); 51FIFTY Jr. ARCA Homecoming 150 (2023); West Coast Stock Car Motorsports Hall of Fame 150 (2024); Second races Race Stuff 250 (1996)

Circuit information
- Surface: Asphalt
- Length: 0.333 mi (0.536 km)
- Turns: 4

The Madera 150 is an ARCA Menards Series West race held annually at Madera Speedway in Madera, California. Hailie Deegan is the defending race winner.

== History ==
Trevor Huddleston's No. 50 (pictured in 2025). Huddleston is the only repeat winner of the Madera 150

The NASCAR Winston West Series made their debut at the Madera Speedway in 1973, with Jack McCoy taking the victory. The series left from 1974 to 1988 before returning in 1989. The series left once again the following year until they returned beginning in 1995 and 1996, where in the latter year the track hosted two races before again getting removed from the schedule.

More events were held in 2003 and 2009 before the ARCA Menards Series West had announced their return to Madera and has been holding races at the track since 2023.

== Past winners ==
Year	Date	No.	Driver	Team	Manufacturer	Race Distance		Race Time	Average Speed (mph)	Report	Ref
Year	Date	No.	Driver	Team	Manufacturer	Laps	Miles (km)	Race Time	Average Speed (mph)	Report	Ref
1973	May 5	7	Jack McCoy	Ernie Conn	Dodge	100	33.3 (53.59)	0:35:35	56.206	Report	
1974 — 1988	Not held										
1989	April 30	75	Bill Sedgwick	Spears Motorsports	Chevrolet	200	66.6 (107.182)	1:01:29	65.058	Report	
1990 — 1994	Not held										
1995	September 2	37	Doug George	Olson Technology Racing	Ford	200	66.6 (107.182)	1:19:55	50.052	Report	
1996	May 18	37	Butch Gilliland	Stroppe Motorsports	Ford (2)	200	66.6 (107.182)	0:58:20	68.571	Report	
1996	August 10	07	Lance Hooper	Golden West Motorsports	Pontiac	250	83.25 (133.978)	1:34:28	52.928	Report	
1997 — 2002	Not held										
2003	May 31	9	Mike Duncan	MB Duncan Motorsports	Chevrolet (2)	152*	50.616 (81.459)	0:52:08	58.254	Report	
2004 — 2008	Not held										
2009	April 25	20	Eric Holmes	Bill McAnally Racing	Toyota	150	50 (80)	0:55:34	53.449	Report	
2010 — 2022	Not held										
2023	October 21	17	Kaden Honeycutt	McGowan Motorsports	Chevrolet (3)	150	50 (80)	0:55:47	53.726	Report	
2024	September 28	50	Trevor Huddleston	High Point Racing	Ford (3)	153*	50.949 (81.994)	0:58:23	51.888	Report	
2025	September 27	50	Trevor Huddleston	High Point Racing (2)	Ford (4)	150	50 (80)	0:57:08	51.984	Report	
2026	September 26	16	Hailie Deegan	Bill McAnally Racing (2)	Chevrolet (4)	157*	52.281 (84.138)	0:57:06	54.441	Report	

- 2003, 2024 & 2026: Race extended due to a Green–white–checker finish.

=== Manufacturer wins ===
# Wins	Make	Years Won
4	(United States) Ford	1995, 1996 (race 1), 2024, 2025
4	(United States) Chevrolet	1989, 2003, 2023, 2026
1	(United States) Dodge	1973
1	(United States) Pontiac	1996 (race 2)
1	(Japan) Toyota	2009

Previous race: NAPA Auto Parts 150 (Roseville)	ARCA Menards Series West; Madera 150	Next race: Kyle Busch Classic
