= John Aramendia =

American racing driver (born 1999)

- Born: John Aramendia Jr. August 10, 1999 (age 27); New Braunfels, Texas, U.S.

ARCA Menards Series career
- 2 races run over 1 year
- Best finish: 109th (2024)
- First race: 2024 Hard Rock Bet 200 (Daytona)
- Last race: 2024 General Tire 150 (Phoenix)
Wins	Top tens	Poles
0	0	0

ARCA Menards Series West career
- 1 race run over 1 year
- Best finish: 77th (2024)
- First race: 2024 General Tire 150 (Phoenix)
Wins	Top tens	Poles
0	0	0
- Statistics up to date as of March 11, 2024.

John Aramendia Jr. (born August 10, 1999) is an American professional stock car racing driver who last competed part-time in the ARCA Menards Series driving the No. 63 Chevrolet for Spraker Racing Enterprises.

== Racing career ==
Aramendia has previously competed in series such as the Red River Modified Tour Factory Stock Division, the CRA JEGS All-Stars Tour, and the Show Me The Money Pro Late Model Series.

In 2023, Aramendia joined Ben Kennedy Racing to participate in various late-model events that year.

In 2024, Aramendia participated in the pre-season test at Daytona International Speedway, driving the No. 63 Chevrolet for Spraker Racing Enterprises, and placed 38th in the overall results between the two testing days. A month later, Aramendia made his debut in the series, driving the No. 63 at the season opening race at Daytona, where he qualified in 28th but finished in 39th after being involved in a multi-car crash three laps into the race. Aramendia and Spraker then entered in the following race at Phoenix Raceway. After placing 31st in the lone practice session, he qualified for the race in 31st, but finished in 34th due to overheating issues. He was originally entered in the race at Talladega Superspeedway, but withdrew a couple days after the entry list was released.

== Personal life ==
Aramendia's father is the owner of 1st Call Plumbing, Heating and Air, formerly Aramendia Plumbing, Heating and Air, a plumbing company based in San Antonio, Texas. He is also the nephew of former NASCAR O'Reilly Auto Parts Series and NASCAR Craftsman Truck Series driver Joe Aramendia.

== Motorsports career results ==
=== ARCA Menards Series ===
(key) (Bold – Pole position awarded by qualifying time. Italics – Pole position earned by points standings or practice time. * – Most laps led. ** – All laps led.)

ARCA Menards Series results
Year	Team	No.	Make	1	2	3	4	5	6	7	8	9	10	11	12	13	14	15	16	17	18	19	20	AMSC	Pts	Ref
2024	Spraker Racing Enterprises	63	Chevy	DAY; 39	PHO; 34	TAL; Wth	DOV	KAN	CLT	IOW	MOH	BLN	IRP	SLM	ELK	MCH	ISF	MLW	DSF	GLN	BRI	KAN	TOL	109th	15	

==== ARCA Menards Series West ====
ARCA Menards Series West results
Year	Team	No.	Make	1	2	3	4	5	6	7	8	9	10	11	12	AMSWC	Pts	Ref
2024	Spraker Racing Enterprises	63	Chevy	PHO; 34	KER	PIR	SON	IRW	IRW	SHA	TRI	MAD	AAS	KER	PHO	77th	10	

=== CARS Pro Late Model Tour ===
(key)

CARS Pro Late Model Tour results
Year	Team	No.	Make	1	2	3	4	5	6	7	8	9	10	11	12	13	CPLMTC	Pts	Ref
2023	N/A	58	Chevy	SNM	HCY	ACE	NWS; DNQ	TCM	DIL	CRW	WKS	HCY	TCM	SBO	TCM	CRW	79th	2	

=== ASA STARS National Tour ===
(key) (Bold – Pole position awarded by qualifying time. Italics – Pole position earned by points standings or practice time. * – Most laps led. ** – All laps led.)

ASA STARS National Tour results
Year	Team	No.	Make	1	2	3	4	5	6	7	8	9	10	ASNTC	Pts	Ref
2023	Ben Kennedy Racing	58	Chevy	FIF	MAD	NWS	HCY	MLW	AND	WIR	TOL	WIN	NSV; 14	73rd	38	
