= Joey Kennealy =

American racing driver

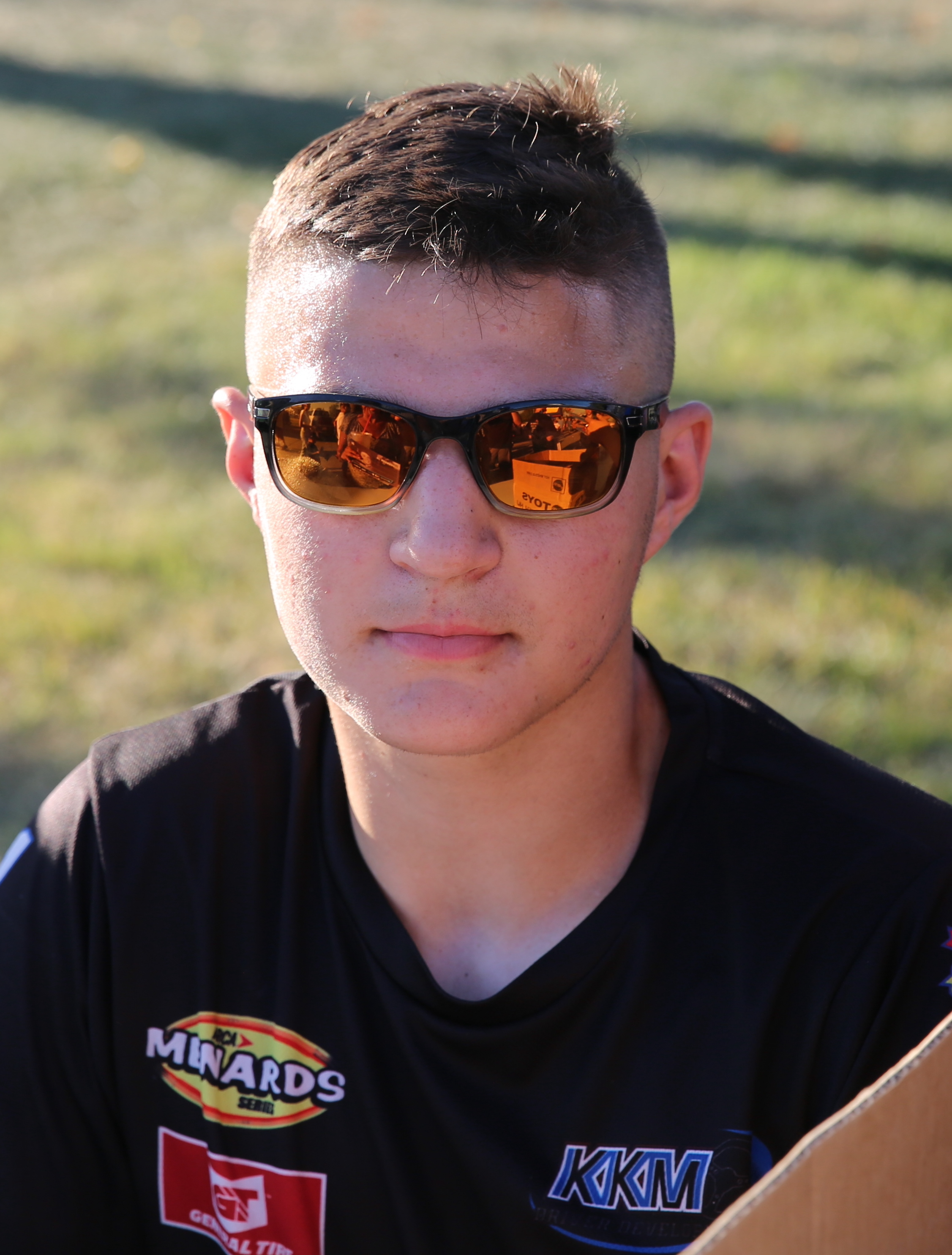
- Kennealy at All American Speedway in 2024
- Born: December 16, 2008 (age 17); Madera, California, U.S.

ARCA Menards Series West career
- 3 races run over 2 years
- Best finish: 32nd (2024)
- First race: 2024 NAPA Auto Parts 150 presented by Berco Redwood (Roseville)
- Last race: 2025 NAPA Auto Parts 150 presented by the West Coast Stock Car Motorsports Hall of Fame (Bakersfield)
Wins	Top tens	Poles
0	0	0
- Statistics up to date as of July 29, 2025.

Joey Kennealy (born December 16, 2008) is an American professional stock car racing driver who last competed part-time in the ARCA Menards Series West, driving the No. 9 Ford for Jan's Towing Racing with Kennealy Keller Motorsports. He is the younger brother of fellow racing driver Robbie Kennealy, who also competes in the series.

== Racing career ==
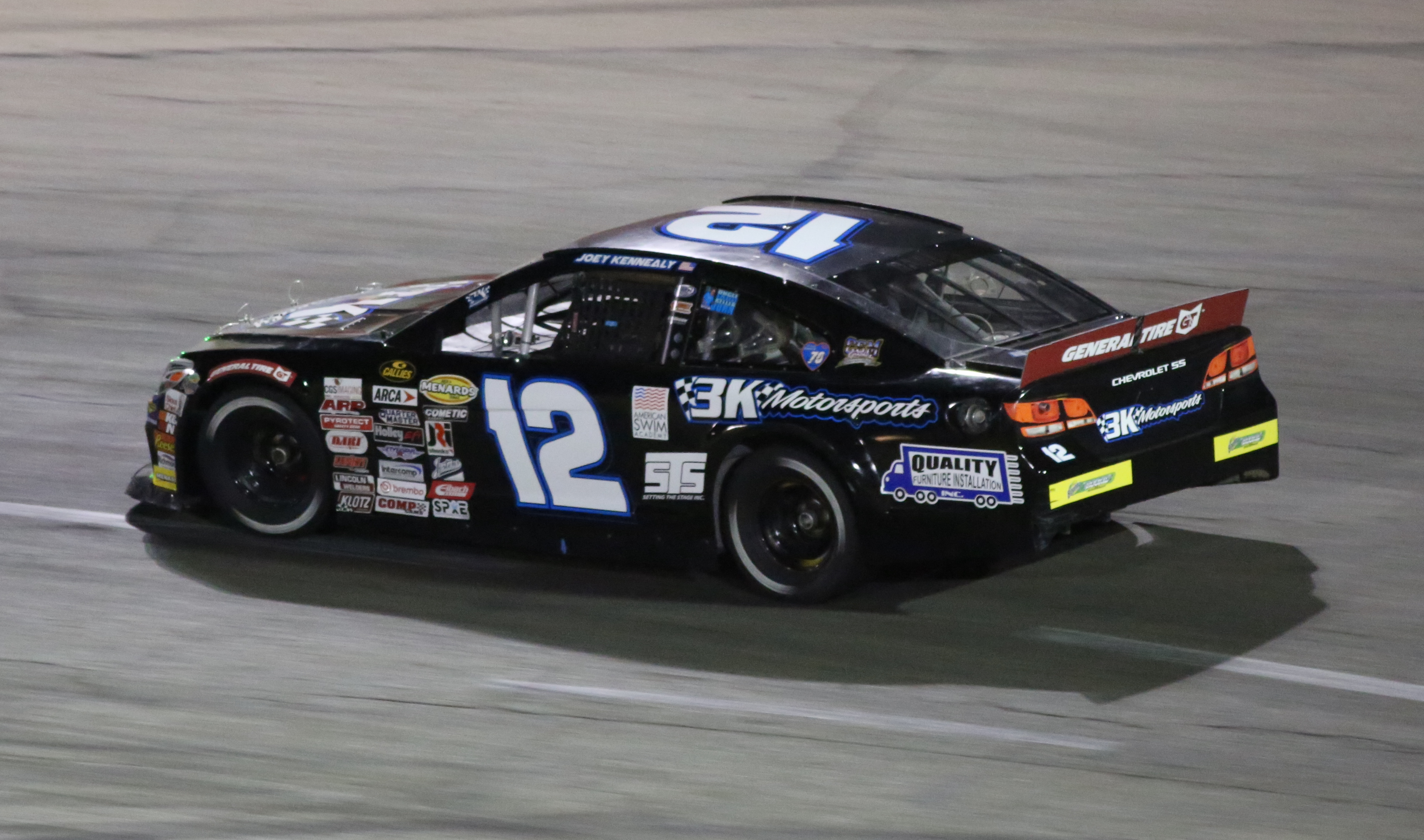
Kennealy's No. 12 car at All American Speedway in 2024.

In 2024, it was revealed that Kennealy would make his debut in the ARCA Menards Series West at All American Speedway, driving the No. 12 Chevrolet for Kennealy Keller Motorsports. After placing ninth in the lone practice session, he qualified and finished eleventh, two laps down to race winner Trevor Huddleston.

On June 5, 2025, it was revealed that he would run the second Kern race in a third car for Jan's Towing Racing, the No. 9.

== Motorsports results ==
=== ARCA Menards Series West ===
(key) (Bold – Pole position awarded by qualifying time. Italics – Pole position earned by points standings or practice time. * – Most laps led.)

ARCA Menards Series West results
Year	Team	No.	Make	1	2	3	4	5	6	7	8	9	10	11	12	AMSWC	Pts	Ref
2024	Kennealy Keller Motorsports	12	Chevy	PHO	KER	PIR	SON	IRW	IRW	SHA	TRI	MAD	AAS; 11	KER; 14	PHO	32nd	63	
2025	Jan's Towing Racing with Kennealy Keller Motorsports	9	Ford	KER	PHO	TUC	CNS	KER; 14	SON	TRI	PIR	AAS; Wth	MAD	LVS	PHO	64th	30	
