= 2024 ARCA Menards Series West =

71st season of the ARCA Menards Series West

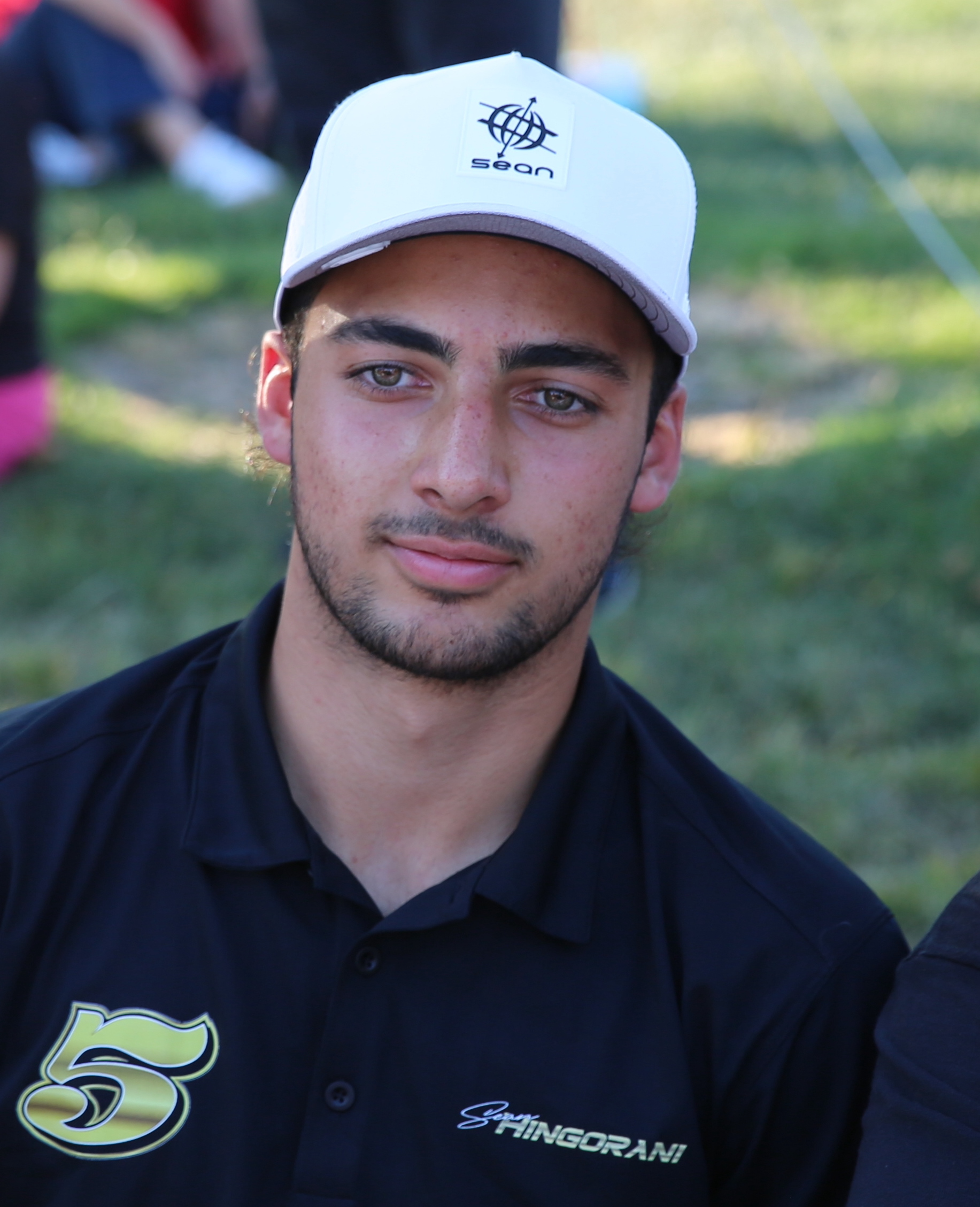
Sean Hingorani, the 2024 ARCA Menards Series West champion.

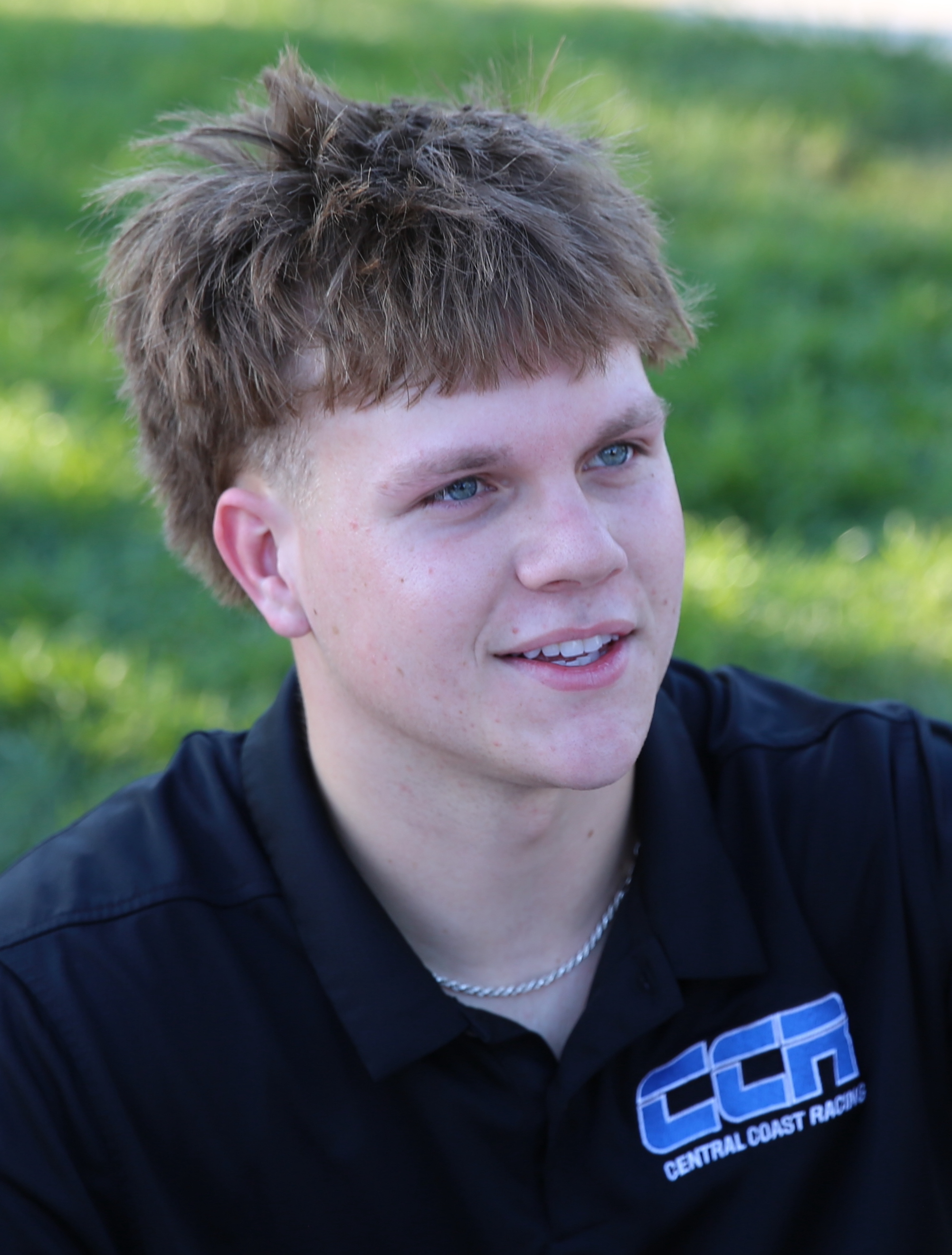
Tyler Reif finished second behind Hingorani in the championship by 19 points.

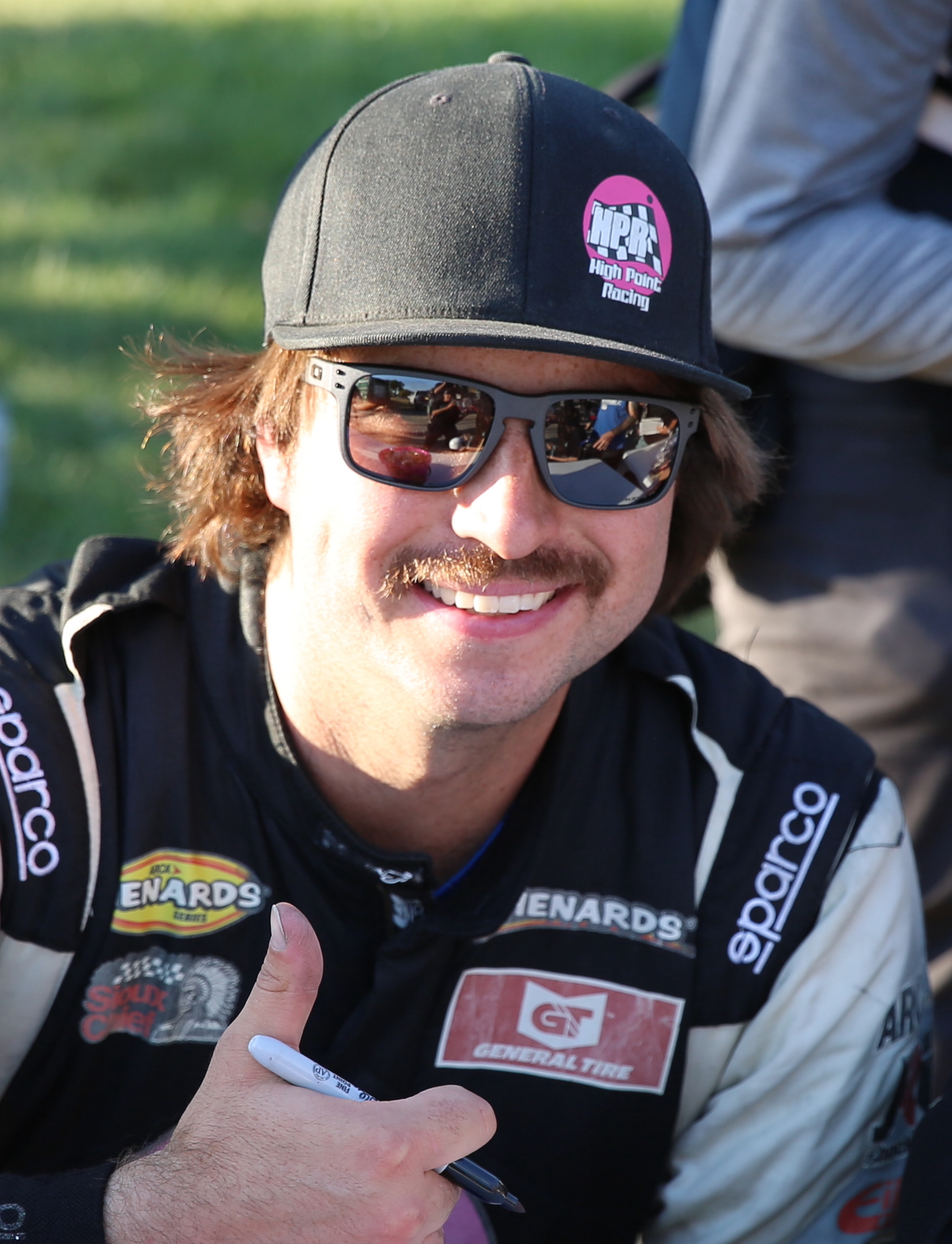
Trevor Huddleston finished third behind Hingorani in the championship by 47 points.

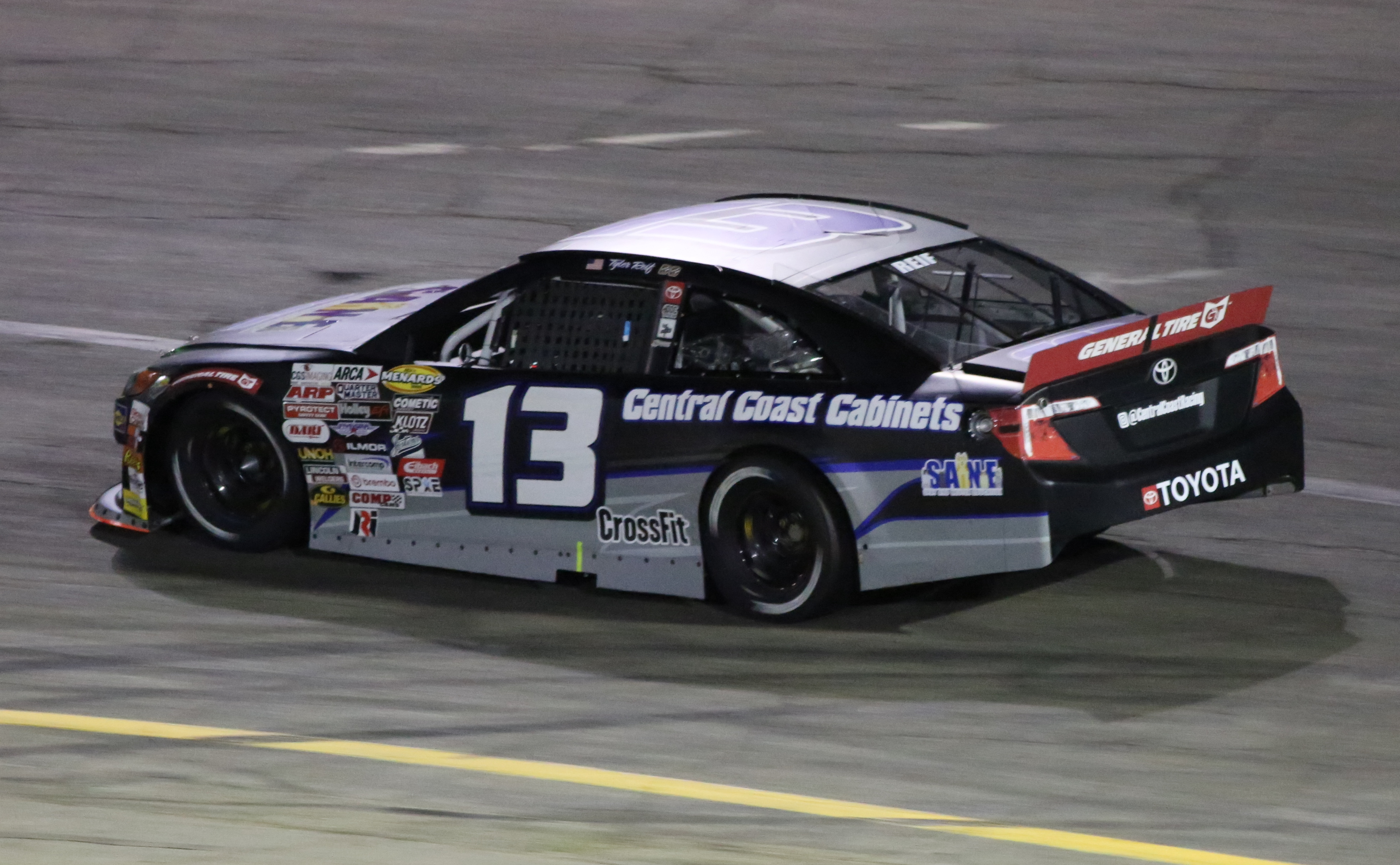
The No. 13 car of Central Coast Racing won the owners' championship.

The 2024 ARCA Menards Series West was the 71st season of the ARCA Menards Series West, a regional stock car racing series sanctioned by NASCAR in the United States. The season began on March 8 at Phoenix Raceway with the General Tire 150 and ended with the Desert Diamond Casino West Valley 100, also at Phoenix Raceway, on November 8.

Sean Hingorani entered the season as the defending ARCA West champion. At the conclusion of the season finale at Phoenix, Hingorani of Venturini Motorsports became the back to back ARCA West champion.

== Teams and drivers ==
Note: If a driver is listed as their own crew chief for a particular race, that means that their entry in that race was a start and park.

=== Complete schedule ===
Manufacturer	Team	No.	Driver	Crew chief
Chevrolet	Bill McAnally Racing	16	Jack Wood	Kevin Bellicourt
Chevrolet	Bill McAnally Racing	19	Eric Johnson Jr. (R)	John Camilleri
Ford	High Point Racing	50	Trevor Huddleston	Jeff Schrader
Ford	Jan's Towing Racing	71	Nick Joanides 8	Rip Michels 8 Mike Naake 2 Marco Peaz 1
Ford	Jan's Towing Racing	71	Rip Michels 4	Rip Michels 8 Mike Naake 2 Marco Peaz 1
Toyota	Central Coast Racing	3	Todd Souza 11	Jason Dickenson
Toyota	Central Coast Racing	3	Kyle Keller 1 (Note: Keller has run the full season split between three different cars: the Kennealy Keller Motorsports No. 70/12, Central Coast Racing No. 3 and Jan's Towing Racing No. 9.)	Jason Dickenson
Toyota	Jerry Pitts Racing	7	Takuma Koga	Denny Moyer
Toyota	Shockwave Motorsports (Note: Entries were fielded in a collaboration with Naake-Klauer Motorsports.)	05	David Smith	Brandon Carlson
Chevrolet 7 Toyota 4	Sigma Performance Services	23	Grant Enfinger 1	Jeff Stankiewicz 1 Kevin Reed Sr.1; Chris Bray 10
Chevrolet 7 Toyota 4	Sigma Performance Services	23	Mason Mitchell 1	Jeff Stankiewicz 1 Kevin Reed Sr.1; Chris Bray 10
Chevrolet 7 Toyota 4	Sigma Performance Services	23	Jake Walker 1	Jeff Stankiewicz 1 Kevin Reed Sr.1; Chris Bray 10
Chevrolet 7 Toyota 4	Sigma Performance Services	23	Sam Mayer 1	Jeff Stankiewicz 1 Kevin Reed Sr.1; Chris Bray 10
Chevrolet 7 Toyota 4	Sigma Performance Services	23	Jaron Giannini 6	Jeff Stankiewicz 1 Kevin Reed Sr.1; Chris Bray 10
Chevrolet 7 Toyota 4	Sigma Performance Services	23	Greg Biffle 1	Jeff Stankiewicz 1 Kevin Reed Sr.1; Chris Bray 10
Chevrolet 7 Toyota 4	Sigma Performance Services	23	Kaden Honeycutt 1	Jeff Stankiewicz 1 Kevin Reed Sr.1; Chris Bray 10
Toyota 10 Ford 2	Central Coast Racing	13	Tyler Reif	Michael Muñoz

=== Limited schedule ===
Manufacturer	Team	No.	Driver	Crew chief	Races
Chevrolet	1/4 Ley Racing	32	Dale Quarterley	Alex Quarterley	2
Chevrolet	Brad Smith Motorsports	48	Brad Smith	Rand Bitter	1
Chevrolet	Cook Racing Technologies	17	Marco Andretti	Sean Samuels	3
Chevrolet	Cook Racing Technologies	17	Buddy Shepherd	Sean Samuels	1
Chevrolet	Cook Racing Technologies	42	Tanner Reif	Jerry Babb 1 Brian Bibeau 2 Danny Johnson 1	2
Chevrolet	Cook Racing Technologies	42	Brandon Jones	Jerry Babb 1 Brian Bibeau 2 Danny Johnson 1	2
Chevrolet	Cook Racing Technologies	42	Spencer Davis	Jerry Babb 1 Brian Bibeau 2 Danny Johnson 1	1
Chevrolet	CW Motorsports	93	Caleb Costner	Darrell Phillips	1
Chevrolet	David Racing	86	Tim Spurgeon	Mike David	1
Chevrolet	Fast Track Racing	99	Michael Maples	Mike Sroufe	1
Chevrolet	Fierce Creature Racing	0	Tony Huffman	Tony Huffman 5 Bobby Hillis Jr. 1	6
Chevrolet	Fierce Creature Racing	27	Bobby Hillis Jr.	Tony Huffman 5 Ed Ash 2	7
Chevrolet	Pinnacle Racing Group	28	Connor Mosack	Shane Huffman	1
Chevrolet	Pinnacle Racing Group	28	Connor Zilisch	Shane Huffman	1
Chevrolet	Rev Racing	2	Andrés Pérez de Lara	Glenn Parker	1
Chevrolet	Rev Racing	2	Sebastian Arias	Glenn Parker	1
Chevrolet	Rev Racing	6	Lavar Scott	Danny Johnson	2
Chevrolet	Rise Motorsports	31	Garrett Zacharias	Tim Goulet 3 Matthew Wright 1	1
Chevrolet	Rise Motorsports	31	Rick Goodale	Tim Goulet 3 Matthew Wright 1	2
Chevrolet	Rise Motorsports	31	Rick Redig-Tackman	Tim Goulet 3 Matthew Wright 1	1
Chevrolet	Rodd Racing	33	P. J. Pedroncelli	Rodd Kneeland	1
Chevrolet	Rodd Racing	68	Rodd Kneeland	Tony Caputo	1
Chevrolet	Sigma Performance Services	24	Joe Farré	Chris Bray	1
Chevrolet	Sigma Performance Services	24	Sean Hingorani (Note: Hingorani has run the full season split between four different cars: the Hattori Racing Enterprises No. 61, Sigma Performance Services No. 24, Jerry Pitts Racing No. 5 and Venturini Motorsports No. 15.)	Chris Bray	1
Chevrolet	Spraker Racing Enterprises	63	John Aramendia	Jeff Spraker	1
Chevrolet	Strike Mamba Racing	72	Jonathan Reaume	John Reaume	1
Ford	AM Racing	32	Christian Rose	Ryan London	1
Ford	AM Racing	76	Kole Raz	Ryan London	1
Ford	Clubb Racing Inc.	03	Alex Clubb	Brian Clubb	1
Ford	Fast Track Racing	10	Brayton Laster	Nathan Davis	1
Ford	Fast Track Racing	11	Brad Perez	Chris Vanscoy	1
Ford	Fast Track Racing	12	Ryan Roulette	Jeremy Petty	1
Ford	Greg Van Alst Motorsports	34	Isaac Johnson	Kevin Shannon	1
Ford	Greg Van Alst Motorsports	35	Greg Van Alst	Jim Long	1
Ford	Jan's Towing Racing	9	Michael Killen	Ron Norman 2 Michael Killen Sr. 2 Brian Kizer 2	4
Ford	Jan's Towing Racing	9	Kyle Keller	Ron Norman 2 Michael Killen Sr. 2 Brian Kizer 2	2
Ford	Lowden Jackson Motorsports	41	Johnny Borneman III	Tony Jackson	3
Ford	Naake Klauer Motorsports	88	Jake Bollman	Mike Naake	1
Ford	Naake Klauer Motorsports	88	John Moore	Mike Naake	1
Ford	Naake Klauer Motorsports	88	Tanner Reif	Mike Naake	2
Ford	Naake Klauer Motorsports	88	Kasey Kleyn	Mike Naake	1
Ford	Rette Jones Racing	30	Noah Gragson	Mark Rette	1
Toyota	Hattori Racing Enterprises	61	Sean Hingorani	Mark McFarland	1
Toyota	Jerry Pitts Racing	5	Kole Raz	Jerry Pitts 1 Dustin Ash 9	4
Toyota	Jerry Pitts Racing	5	Sean Hingorani	Jerry Pitts 1 Dustin Ash 9	6
Toyota	Joe Gibbs Racing	18	William Sawalich	Matt Ross	4
Toyota	KLAS Motorsports	73	Andy Jankowiak	Mike Dayton	1
Toyota	Nascimento Motorsports	21	Henry Barton	Mike Nascimento	1
Toyota	Nascimento Motorsports	21	Travis McCullough	Mike Nascimento	1
Toyota	Nascimento Motorsports	21	Ethan Nascimento	Mike Nascimento	3
Toyota	Nascimento Motorsports	21	Alex Malycke	Mike Nascimento	1
Toyota	Performance P–1 Motorsports	77	Cody Kiemele	Ryan Sebek 2 Unknown 1 Roger Bracken 3 Tony Jackson 1	2
Toyota	Performance P–1 Motorsports	77	Dave Smith	Ryan Sebek 2 Unknown 1 Roger Bracken 3 Tony Jackson 1	2
Toyota	Performance P–1 Motorsports	77	Garrett Zacharias	Ryan Sebek 2 Unknown 1 Roger Bracken 3 Tony Jackson 1	2
Toyota	Performance P–1 Motorsports	77	Kyle Whisner	Ryan Sebek 2 Unknown 1 Roger Bracken 3 Tony Jackson 1	1
Toyota	Venturini Motorsports	15	Kris Wright	Larry Balsitis 3 Tab Smith 2 Taylor DeWolf 1 Tyler Barrett 1	1
Toyota	Venturini Motorsports	15	Jake Finch	Larry Balsitis 3 Tab Smith 2 Taylor DeWolf 1 Tyler Barrett 1	1
Toyota	Venturini Motorsports	15	Brent Crews	Larry Balsitis 3 Tab Smith 2 Taylor DeWolf 1 Tyler Barrett 1	1
Toyota	Venturini Motorsports	15	Sean Hingorani	Larry Balsitis 3 Tab Smith 2 Taylor DeWolf 1 Tyler Barrett 1	4
Toyota	Venturini Motorsports	20	Gio Ruggiero	Shannon Rursch 3 Tyler Barrett 2 Gregory Papp 1 Taylor DeWolf 1	4
Toyota	Venturini Motorsports	20	Jake Finch	Shannon Rursch 3 Tyler Barrett 2 Gregory Papp 1 Taylor DeWolf 1	3
Toyota	Venturini Motorsports	20	Brent Crews	Shannon Rursch 3 Tyler Barrett 2 Gregory Papp 1 Taylor DeWolf 1	1
Toyota	Venturini Motorsports	22	Amber Balcaen	Dave Fuge 1 Shane Everts 1	1
Toyota	Venturini Motorsports	22	Brent Crews	Dave Fuge 1 Shane Everts 1	1
Toyota	Venturini Motorsports	25	Toni Breidinger	Cayden Lapcevich 1 Matt Bayyouk 1	1
Toyota	Venturini Motorsports	25	Marco Andretti	Cayden Lapcevich 1 Matt Bayyouk 1	1
Toyota	Venturini Motorsports	55	Isabella Robusto	Kevin Reed Jr. 3 Owen Smith 2 Tyler Barrett 1 Gregory Papp 1	6
Toyota	Venturini Motorsports	55	Jake Finch	Kevin Reed Jr. 3 Owen Smith 2 Tyler Barrett 1 Gregory Papp 1	1
Toyota	Wayne Peterson Racing	06	Cody Dennison	Nate Moeller	1
Ford 4 Chevrolet 2	Kennealy Keller Motorsports	1	Robbie Kennealy (R)	Charlie Wilson	6
Chevrolet 3 Ford 1	Kennealy Keller Motorsports	11	Danica Dart (R)	John Keller	4
Chevrolet 3 Ford 1	Kennealy Keller Motorsports	11	Robbie Kennealy (R)	John Keller	2
Ford 7 Chevrolet 4	Kennealy Keller Motorsports	12	Kyle Keller	Brian Kizer 10; John Keller 1	9
Ford 7 Chevrolet 4	Kennealy Keller Motorsports	12	Joey Kennealy	Brian Kizer 10; John Keller 1	2
Chevrolet 1 Toyota 1	Legal Limit Motorsports	80	Brian Kamisky	Derek Copeland 1 Brian Kamisky 1	1
Chevrolet 1 Toyota 1	Legal Limit Motorsports	80	Derek Copeland	Derek Copeland 1 Brian Kamisky 1	1
Chevrolet 4 Toyota 1	Nascimento Motorsports	4	Eric Nascimento	Ty Joiner	6
Chevrolet 1 Toyota 1	Philpott Race Cars	52	Ryan Philpott	Chuck Dozier	2
Ford 2 Toyota 4	Jerry Pitts Racing	6	Caleb Shrader	Jerry Pitts	2
Ford 2 Toyota 4	Jerry Pitts Racing	6	Jess Havens	Jerry Pitts	1
Ford 2 Toyota 4	Jerry Pitts Racing	6	Henry Barton	Jerry Pitts	3

== Schedule ==
The full schedule was announced on December 6, 2023. Some race dates were announced before then as part of the announcement of the main ARCA Series schedule on November 28.

Notes:

- The race at Phoenix in March is a combination race with the ARCA Menards Series (highlighted in gold).
- Race names and title sponsors are subject to change. Not all title sponsors/names of races have been announced for 2024. For the races where a 2024 name and title sponsor has yet to be announced, the title sponsors/names of those races in 2023 are listed.

No	Race title	Track	Location	Date
1	General Tire 150	Phoenix Raceway	Avondale, Arizona	March 8
2	MMI Oil Workers 150 presented by the West Coast Stock Car Motorsports Hall of Fame	Kevin Harvick's Kern Raceway	Bakersfield, California	April 20
3	Portland 112	Portland International Raceway	Portland, Oregon	May 31
4	General Tire 200	Sonoma Raceway	Sonoma, California	June 7
5	NAPA Auto Parts 150 presented by the West Coast Stock Car Motorsports Hall of Fame	Irwindale Speedway	Irwindale, California	July 4
6	West Coast Stock Car Motorsports Hall of Fame 150 presented by NAPA Auto Parts	Irwindale Speedway	Irwindale, California	July 6
7	Shasta 150	Shasta Speedway	Anderson, California	July 27
8	NAPA Auto Care 150	Tri-City Raceway	West Richland, Washington	August 10
9	West Coast Stock Car Motorsports Hall of Fame 150	Madera Speedway	Madera, California	September 28
10	NAPA Auto Parts 150 presented by Berco Redwood	All American Speedway	Roseville, California	October 5
11	NAPA Auto Parts 150 presented by the West Coast Stock Car Motorsports Hall of Fame	Kevin Harvick's Kern Raceway	Bakersfield, California	October 26
12	Desert Diamond Casino West Valley 100	Phoenix Raceway	Avondale, Arizona	November 8

=== Schedule changes ===
- The race at Evergreen Speedway was removed from the schedule and replaced by a race at Tri-City Raceway. Both tracks are located in the state of Washington. Tri-City Raceway was last on the West Series schedule in 2003.
- The race at Madera Speedway moves from October to September.
- The race at All-American Speedway moves from September to October.
- The race at the Las Vegas Motor Speedway Bullring was removed from the schedule and replaced by a second race at the newly-renamed Kevin Harvick's Kern Raceway. (The track was previously Kern County Raceway Park and was renamed in November 2023 when Kevin Harvick joined the track's staff as a consultant after his retirement from driving full-time in NASCAR and after the track was purchased by new owners.)
- The race at Madera Speedway moves from September 21 to 28
- The first race at Irwindale was originally supposed to be held on March 30, but was postponed to July 6 due to impending bad weather. And the doubleheader races at Irwindale ended being the last two ARCA West Series races on the venue, since Irwindale Speedway closed the doors at the end of 2024.

== Results and standings ==
=== Race results ===
No.	Race	Pole position	Most laps led	Winning driver	Manufacturer	No.	Winning team	Report
1	General Tire 150	William Sawalich	William Sawalich	William Sawalich	Toyota	18	Joe Gibbs Racing	Report
2	MMI Oil Workers 150	Tyler Reif	Tyler Reif	Kole Raz	Toyota	5	Jerry Pitts Racing	Report
3	Portland 112	Brandon Jones	William Sawalich	William Sawalich	Toyota	18	Joe Gibbs Racing	Report
4	General Tire 200	Sam Mayer	Sam Mayer	Sam Mayer	Chevrolet	23	Sigma Performance Services	Report
5	NAPA Auto Parts 150 presented by the West Coast Stock Car Motorsports Hall of Fame	Tyler Reif	Sean Hingorani	Sean Hingorani	Toyota	15	Venturini Motorsports	Report
6	West Coast Stock Car Motorsports Hall of Fame 150 presented by NAPA Auto Parts	Nick Joanides	Trevor Huddleston	Sean Hingorani	Toyota	15	Venturini Motorsports	Report
7	Shasta 150	Tyler Reif	Tyler Reif	Tyler Reif	Toyota	13	Central Coast Racing	Report
8	NAPA Auto Care 150	Sean Hingorani	Sean Hingorani	Tyler Reif	Toyota	13	Central Coast Racing	Report
9	West Coast Stock Car Motorsports Hall of Fame 150	Jaron Giannini	Trevor Huddleston	Trevor Huddleston	Ford	50	High Point Racing	Report
10	NAPA Auto Parts 150 presented by Berco Redwood	Trevor Huddleston	Trevor Huddleston	Trevor Huddleston	Ford	50	High Point Racing	Report
11	NAPA Auto Parts 150 presented by the West Coast Stock Car Motorsports Hall of Fame	Sean Hingorani	Sean Hingorani	Sean Hingorani	Toyota	15	Venturini Motorsports	Report
12	Desert Diamond Casino West Valley 100	William Sawalich	Connor Zilisch	Connor Zilisch	Chevrolet	28	Pinnacle Racing Group	Report

=== Drivers' championship ===
Notes:

- The pole winner also receives one bonus point, similar to the previous ARCA points system used until 2019 and unlike NASCAR.
- Additionally, after groups of five races of the season, drivers that compete in all five races receive fifty additional points. These points bonuses will be given after the races at Irwindale (race #1) and Roseville.
  - Tyler Reif, Sean Hingorani, Trevor Huddleston, Jack Wood, Kyle Keller, Eric Johnson Jr., Takuma Koga, Nick Joanides, Todd Souza, Robbie Kennealy, David Smith, and Bobby Hillis Jr. received this points bonus for having competed in the first five races of the season (Phoenix in March, Kern County in April, Portland, Sonoma, and the Thursday race at Irwindale). Hingorani, Reif, Huddleston, Wood, Keller, Johnson, Koga, and Smith received this points bonus for having competed in the next five races (the Saturday race at Irwindale, Shasta, Tri-City, Madera, and Roseville). Hingorani, Reif, Huddleston, Wood, Keller, Johnson, Koga, Smith, Souza, Kole Raz, Eric Nascimento, and Rip Michels all received this points bonus after competing in the final two races of the year (Kern County in October and Phoenix in November).

(key) Bold – Pole position awarded by time. Italics – Pole position set by final practice results or rainout. * – Most laps led. ** – All laps led.

Pos	Driver	PHO	KER	PIR	SON	IRW	IRW	SHA	TRI	MAD	AAS	KER	PHO	Points
1	Sean Hingorani	5	4	16	3	1**	1	2	**2***	2	4	**1****	3	653
2	Tyler Reif	11	**3***	4	2	**5**	3	**1****	1	14	3	4	8	634
3	Trevor Huddleston	17	2	8	18	4	9*	3	7	1*	**1****	3	13	606
4	Jack Wood	7	12	12	5	14	2	6	3	12	5	5	11	584
5	Kyle Keller	18	7	9	9	8	11	5	5	5	10	19	10	562
6	Eric Johnson Jr. **(R)**	20	10	19	7	11	10	12	13	4	8	9	15	540
7	Takuma Koga	23	15	10	13	9	13	9	11	7	12	15	19	522
8	David Smith	32	16	17	20	15	15	10	15	13	15	16	18	476
9	Todd Souza	19	9	22	29	10	7	7	4	11	Wth	12	14	440
10	Nick Joanides	26	5	14	19	7	**4**	8	10					310
11	Robbie Kennealy **(R)**	22	23	13	17	18	Wth	13		17				235
12	Kole Raz		1			17	6					6	9	235
13	Eric Nascimento		6		22					16	2	17	21	230
14	Jaron Giannini					6	5	11		**6**	7	7		224
15	Isabella Robusto	6		3	6	2	17					18		213
16	Bobby Hillis Jr.	36	17	15	28	16	19						23	204
17	William Sawalich	**1***		1*	4								**2**	181
18	Rip Michels									9	14	8	20	175
19	Jake Finch			11		3	8						7	147
20	Gio Ruggiero	2		5	25								4	141
21	Michael Killen					13	12			10	13			128
22	Henry Barton		20							8	9	13		126
23	Marco Andretti	21		7	11								17	120
24	Ethan Nascimento									3	6	10	PR	113
25	Brent Crews				23							2	5	102
26	Danica Dart **(R)**	40	22				14		14					86
27	Brandon Jones			**2**	8									80
28	Tony Huffman		21	24	31	Wth	Wth						24	76
29	Dale Quarterley			6	14									68
30	Lavar Scott	10											12	66
31	Johnny Borneman III	33	11		24									64
32	Joey Kennealy										11	14		63
33	Garrett Zacharias	DNQ	Wth			12	18							58
34	Tanner Reif	14		20	Wth									54
35	Rick Goodale					19	16							53
36	Sam Mayer				**1***									48
37	Connor Zilisch												1*	48
38	Ryan Philpott		14		30									44
39	Grant Enfinger	3												41
40	Connor Mosack	4												40
41	Derek Copeland							4						40
42	Caleb Shrader			21	27									40
43	Dave Smith			23	26									39
44	Kasey Kleyn								6					38
45	Kaden Honeycutt												6	38
46	Andrés Pérez de Lara	8												36
47	P. J. Pedroncelli		8											36
48	Jess Havens								8					36
49	Toni Breidinger	9												35
50	Greg Biffle								9					35
51	Travis McCullough				10									34
52	Spencer Davis											11		33
53	Kris Wright	12												32
54	Tim Spurgeon				12									32
55	Rick Redig-Tackman								12					32
56	Greg Van Alst	13												31
57	John Moore		13											31
58	Cody Kiemele	39	19											30
59	Amber Balcaen	15												29
60	Rodd Kneeland				15									29
61	Kyle Whisner									15				29
62	Noah Gragson				16									29
63	Christian Rose	16												28
64	Sebastian Arias												16	28
65	Mason Mitchell		18											26
66	Jake Walker			18										26
67	Buddy Shepherd											20		24
68	Brian Kamisky				21									24
69	Alex Malycke												22	22
70	Isaac Johnson	24												20
71	Caleb Costner	25												19
72	Andy Jankowiak	27												17
73	Ryan Roulette	28												16
74	Michael Maples	29												15
75	Alex Clubb	30												14
76	Jake Bollman	31												13
77	John Aramendia	34												10
78	Joe Farré	35	Wth											9
79	Brayton Laster	37												7
80	Brad Perez	38												6
	Brad Smith	DNQ												0
	Cody Dennison	DNQ												0
	Tim Goulet						Wth		Wth					0
	Jonathan Reaume												Wth	0
	Joey Iest												RL	0

== See also ==
- 2024 NASCAR Cup Series
- 2024 NASCAR Xfinity Series
- 2024 NASCAR Craftsman Truck Series
- 2024 ARCA Menards Series
- 2024 ARCA Menards Series East
- 2024 NASCAR Whelen Modified Tour
- 2024 NASCAR Canada Series
- 2024 NASCAR Mexico Series
- 2024 NASCAR Whelen Euro Series
- 2024 NASCAR Brasil Sprint Race
- 2024 CARS Tour
- 2024 SMART Modified Tour
- 2024 ASA STARS National Tour
