= Travis McCullough =

American racing driver (born 1984)

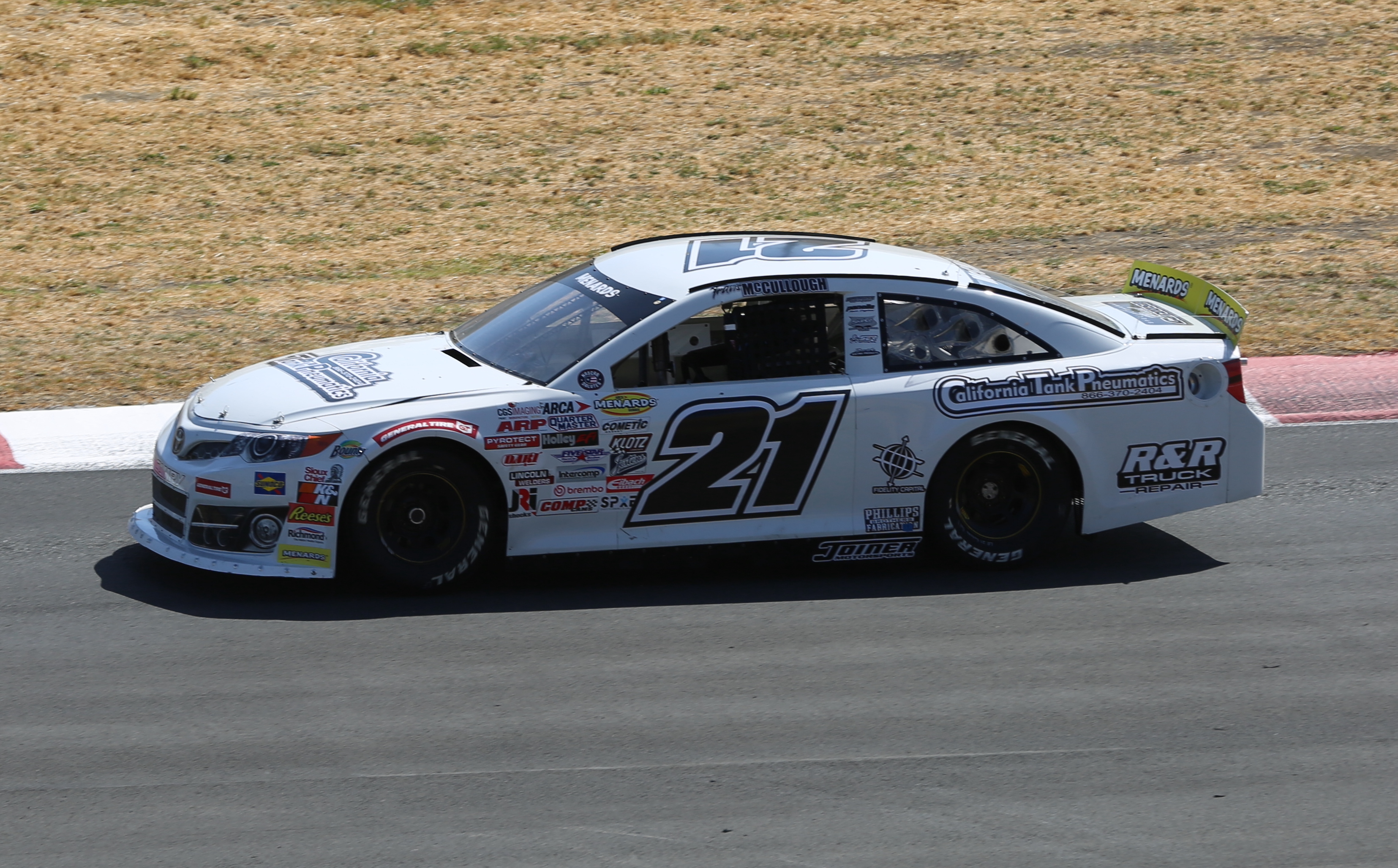
- McCullough's car at Sonoma Raceway in 2024
- Born: October 3, 1984 (age 42); Lodi, California, U.S.

ARCA Menards Series West career
- 4 races run over 3 years
- First race: 2007 Blue Lizard Suncream 200 (Sonoma)
- Last race: 2024 General Tire 200 (Sonoma)
Wins	Top tens	Poles
0	1	0
- Statistics up to date as of June 7, 2022.

Travis McCullough (born October 3, 1984) is an American professional racing driver who competes full-time in the SPEARS SRL Southwest Tour Series, driving the No. 36 for his own family team, McCullough Racing.

== Racing career ==
=== Early career ===
In 2000, McCullough raced mini stocks at Delta Speedway.

In 2005, McCullough ran and was the lead instructor of the Uraceit racing school in Altamont Speedway.

In 2019, McCullough would finish third in the Lucas Oil Modified Series in points.

In 2021, McCullough would earn his first career victory in the SPEARS SRL Southwest Tour Series at the Irwindale Event Center. Since then, he has gained one more victory in the series.

On June 8, 2022, G2G Racing announced that McCullough would attempt to make his Truck Series debut in the team's No. 47 truck in the race at Sonoma. However, McCullough was unable to drive the truck at all due to his drug test results not coming in in time for practice. (As it was his first start of the season, he had to take a drug test beforehand.) The No. 47 truck would end up being withdrawn from the race.

On July 27, 2022, McCullough and G2G owner Tim Viens both tweeted that McCullough would run a race for the team in 2023 after being unable to hit the track at Sonoma, although this never materialized.

In June 2024, it was revealed that McCullough will make his ARCA Menards Series West return after 16 years at Sonoma Raceway, driving the No. 21 Toyota for Nascimento Motorsports. He would end up finishing tenth in the race.

== Motorsports results ==
=== ARCA Menards Series West ===
ARCA Menards Series West results
Year	Team	No.	Make	1	2	3	4	5	6	7	8	9	10	11	12	13	AMSWC	Pts	Ref
2007	McCullough Racing	35	Chevy	CTS	PHO	AMP	ELK	IOW	CNS	SON; 31	DCS	IRW	MMP	EVG	CSR; 24	AMP	46th	161	
2008	McCullough Racing	35	Chevy	AAS	PHO	CTS	IOW	CNS	SON; 18	IRW	DCS	EVG	MMP	IRW	AMP	AAS	62nd	109	
2024	Nascimento Motorsports	21	Toyota	PHO	KER	PIR	SON; 10	IRW	IRW	SHA	TRI	MAD	AAS	KER	PHO		51st	34	
