= Kyle Whisner =

American racing driver

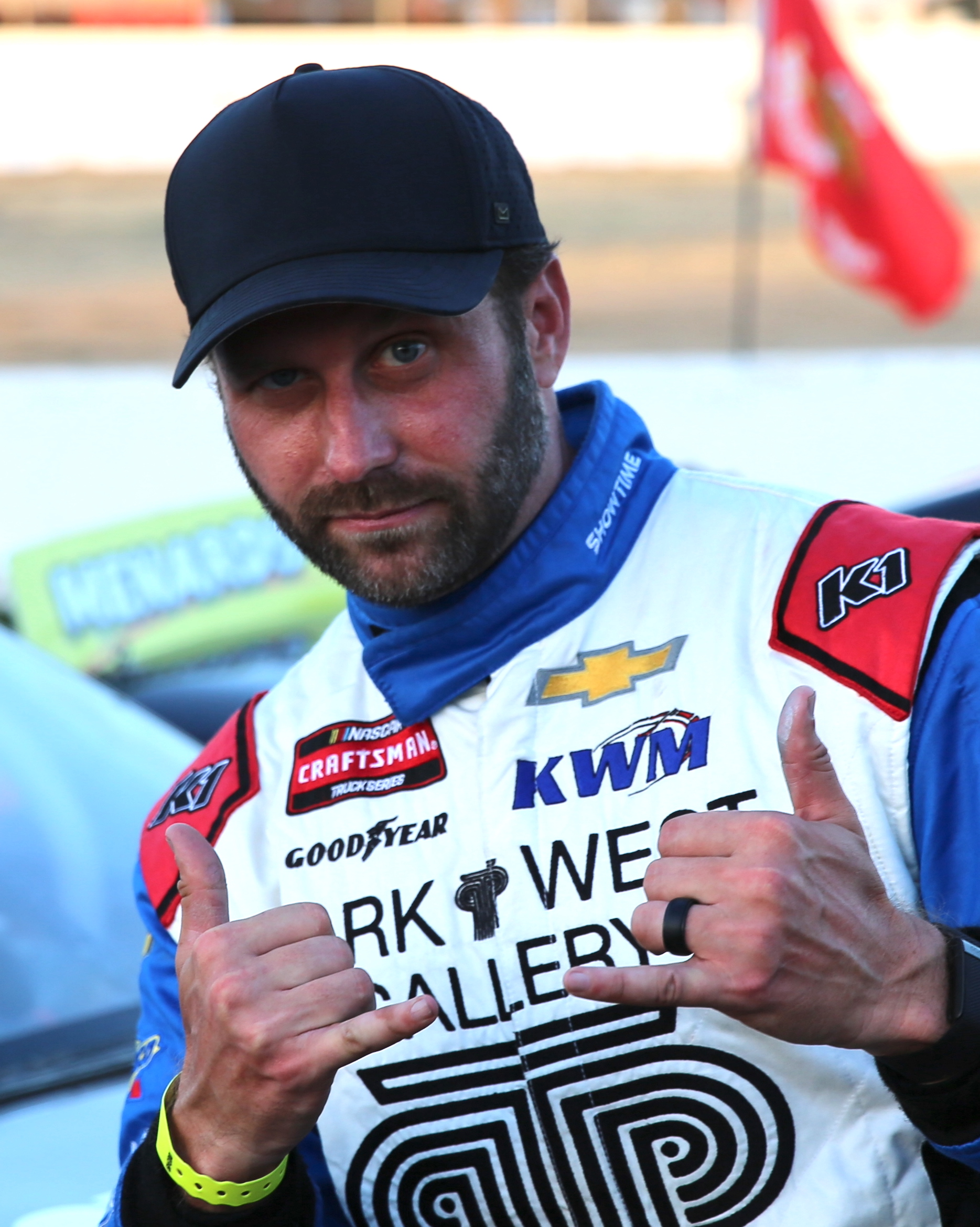
- Whisner at Madera Speedway in 2024
- Born: April 18, 1982 (age 44); Loma Linda, California, U.S.

ARCA Menards Series West career
- 1 race run over 1 year
- Best finish: 61st (2024)
- First race: 2024 West Coast Stock Car Motorsports Hall of Fame 150 (Madera)
Wins	Top tens	Poles
0	0	0
- Statistics up to date as of May 12, 2024.

Kyle Thomas Whisner (born April 18, 1982) is an American professional stock car racing driver and actor who last competed part-time in the ARCA Menards Series West, driving the No. 77 Toyota for Performance P–1 Motorsports.

== Racing career ==
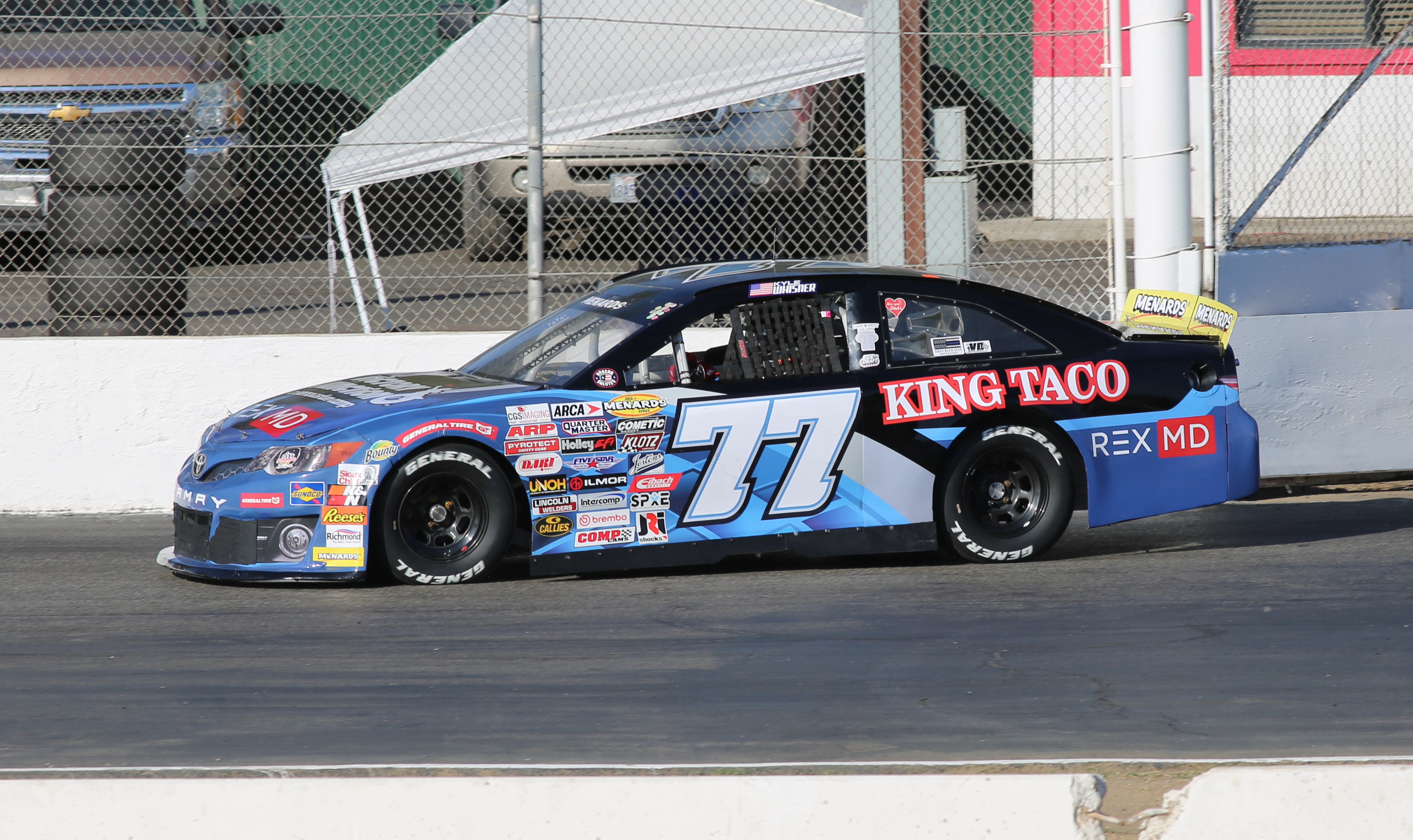
Whisner's No. 77 car at Madera Speedway in 2024.

Whisner has previously competed in series such as the Racecar Factory Spec Late Model Touring Series, the SEST Limited Late Models Series, and the SouthEast Super Trucks Series.

In 2024, it was revealed that Whisner would make his debut in the ARCA Menards Series West at Madera Speedway, driving the No. 77 Toyota for Performance P–1 Motorsports. After placing fifteenth in the lone practice session, he qualified and finished in fifteenth due to being involved in a crash midway through the race.

== Motorsports results ==
=== ARCA Menards Series West ===
(key) (Bold – Pole position awarded by qualifying time. Italics – Pole position earned by points standings or practice time. * – Most laps led. ** – All laps led.)

ARCA Menards Series West results
Year	Team	No.	Make	1	2	3	4	5	6	7	8	9	10	11	12	AMSWC	Pts	Ref
2024	Performance P-1 Motorsports	77	Toyota	PHO	KER	PIR	SON	IRW	IRW	SHA	TRI	MAD; 15	AAS	KER	PHO	61st	29	
