= Rip Michels =

American racing driver (born 1965)

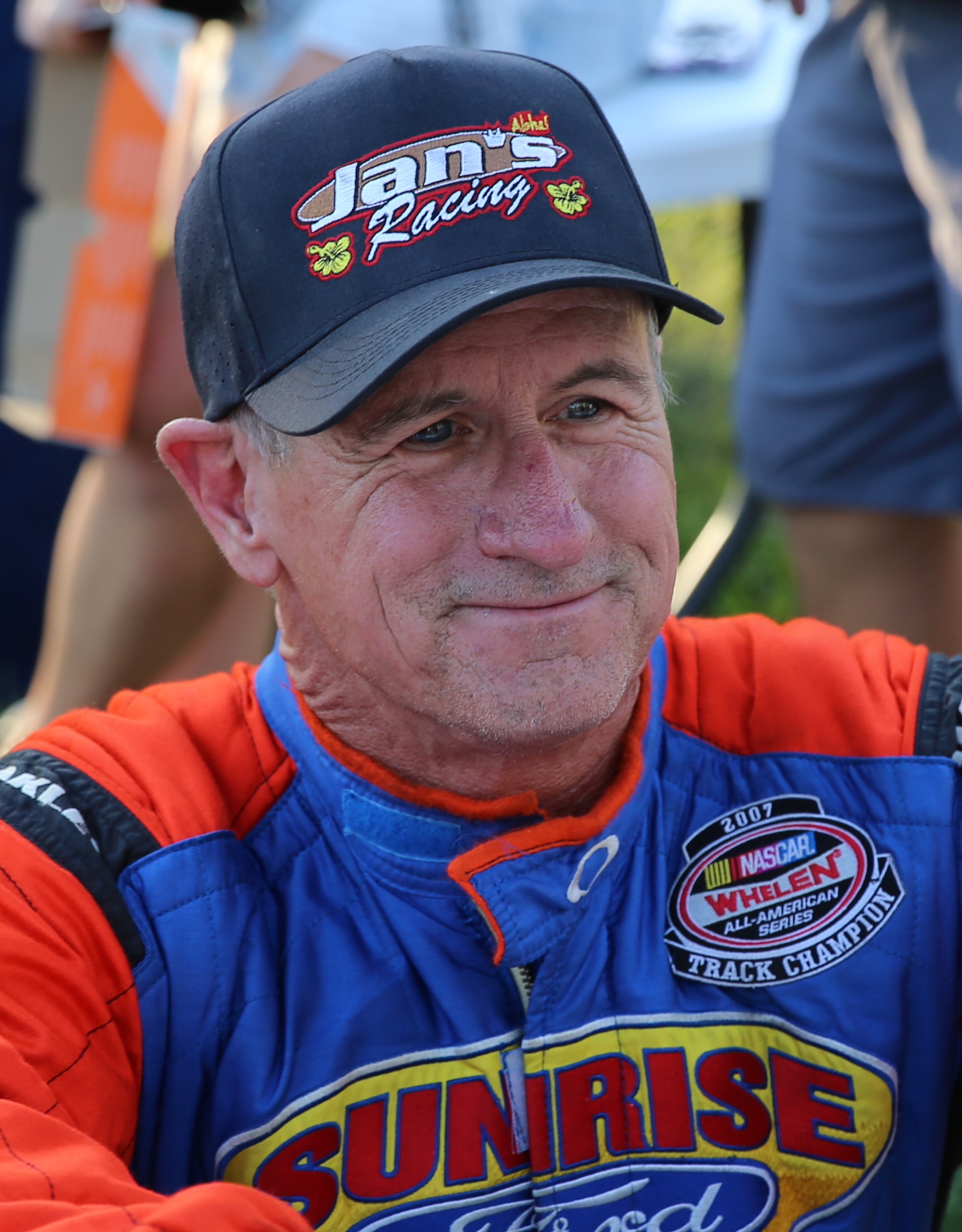
- Michels at All American Speedway in 2024
- Born: May 3, 1965 (age 61); Mission Hills, California, U.S.

ARCA Menards Series West career
- 4 races run over 1 year
- Best finish: 18th (2024)
- First race: 2024 West Coast Stock Car Motorsports Hall of Fame 150 (Madera)
- Last race: 2024 Desert Diamond Casino West Valley 100 (Phoenix)
| Wins | Top tens | Poles |
|---|---|---|
| 0 | 2 | 0 |
- Statistics up to date as of November 2, 2025.

Rip Michels (born May 3, 1965) is an American professional stock car racing driver and crew chief who last competed part-time in the ARCA Menards Series West, driving the No. 71 Ford for Jan's Towing Racing.

== Racing career ==
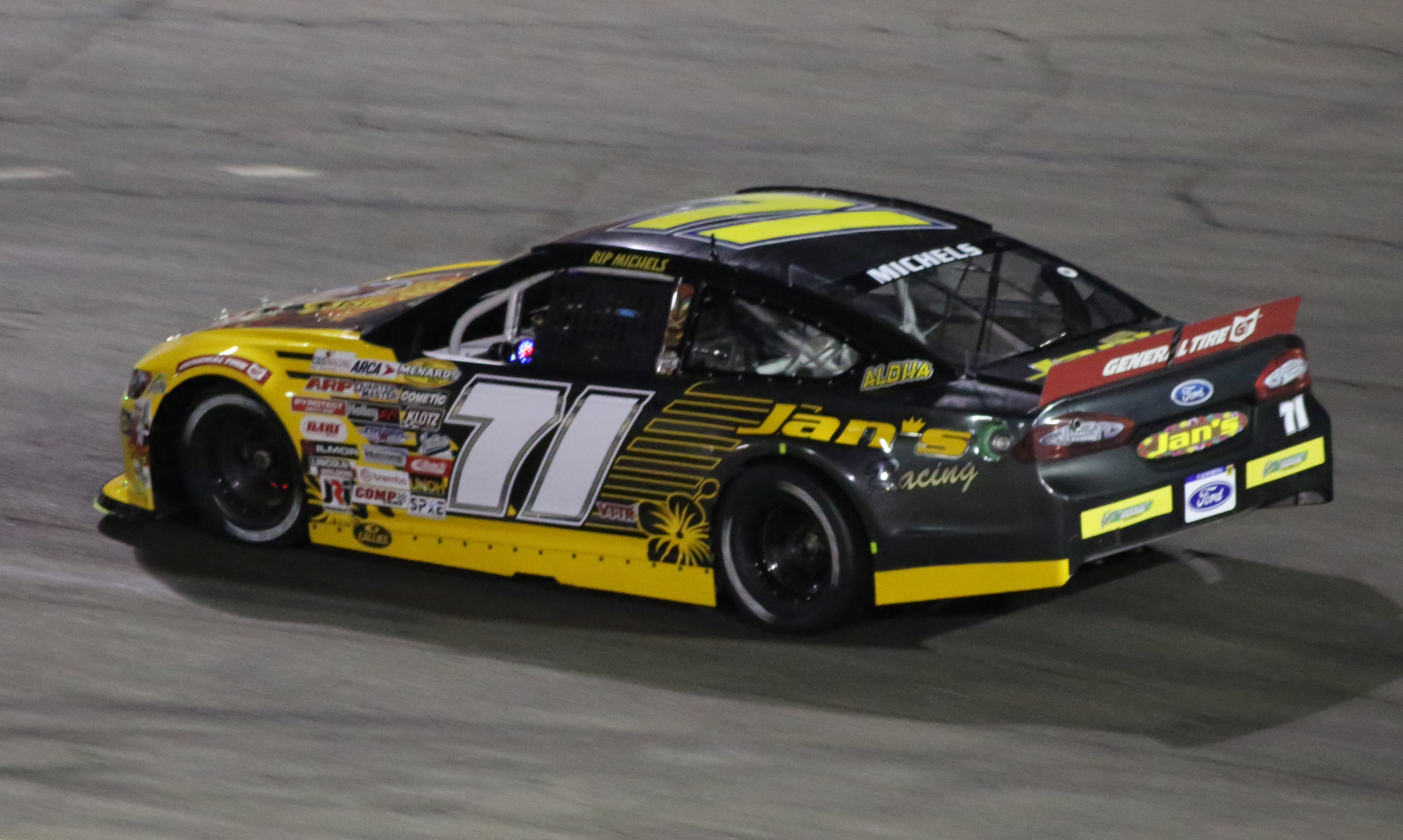
Michels' No. 71 car at All American Speedway in 2024.

Michels previously competed in series such as the NASCAR Southwest Series, where he won the championship in the series' final season in 2006, the SRL Spears Southwest Tour Series, the United States Late Model Association, and the Rocky Mountain Challenge Series.

In 2024, it was revealed that Michels would make his debut in the ARCA Menards Series West at Madera Speedway, driving the No. 71 Ford for Jan's Towing Racing. He had previously served as the crew chief for the team, and was a replacement for regular driver Nick Joanides, who was recovering from pneumonia. After placing seventh in the lone practice session, he qualified in tenth and finished on the lead lap in ninth place.

== Motorsports results ==
=== ARCA Menards Series West ===
(key) (Bold – Pole position awarded by qualifying time. Italics – Pole position earned by points standings or practice time. * – Most laps led. ** – All laps led.)

ARCA Menards Series West results
| Year | Team | No. | Make | 1 | 2 | 3 | 4 | 5 | 6 | 7 | 8 | 9 | 10 | 11 | 12 | AMSWC | Pts | Ref |
|---|---|---|---|---|---|---|---|---|---|---|---|---|---|---|---|---|---|---|
| 2024 | Jan's Towing Racing | 71 | Ford | PHO | KER | PIR | SON | IRW | IRW | SHA | TRI | MAD; 9 | AAS; 14 | KER; 8 | PHO; 20 | 18th | 175 | |
