= Tony Huffman =

American racing driver and crew chief (born 1965)

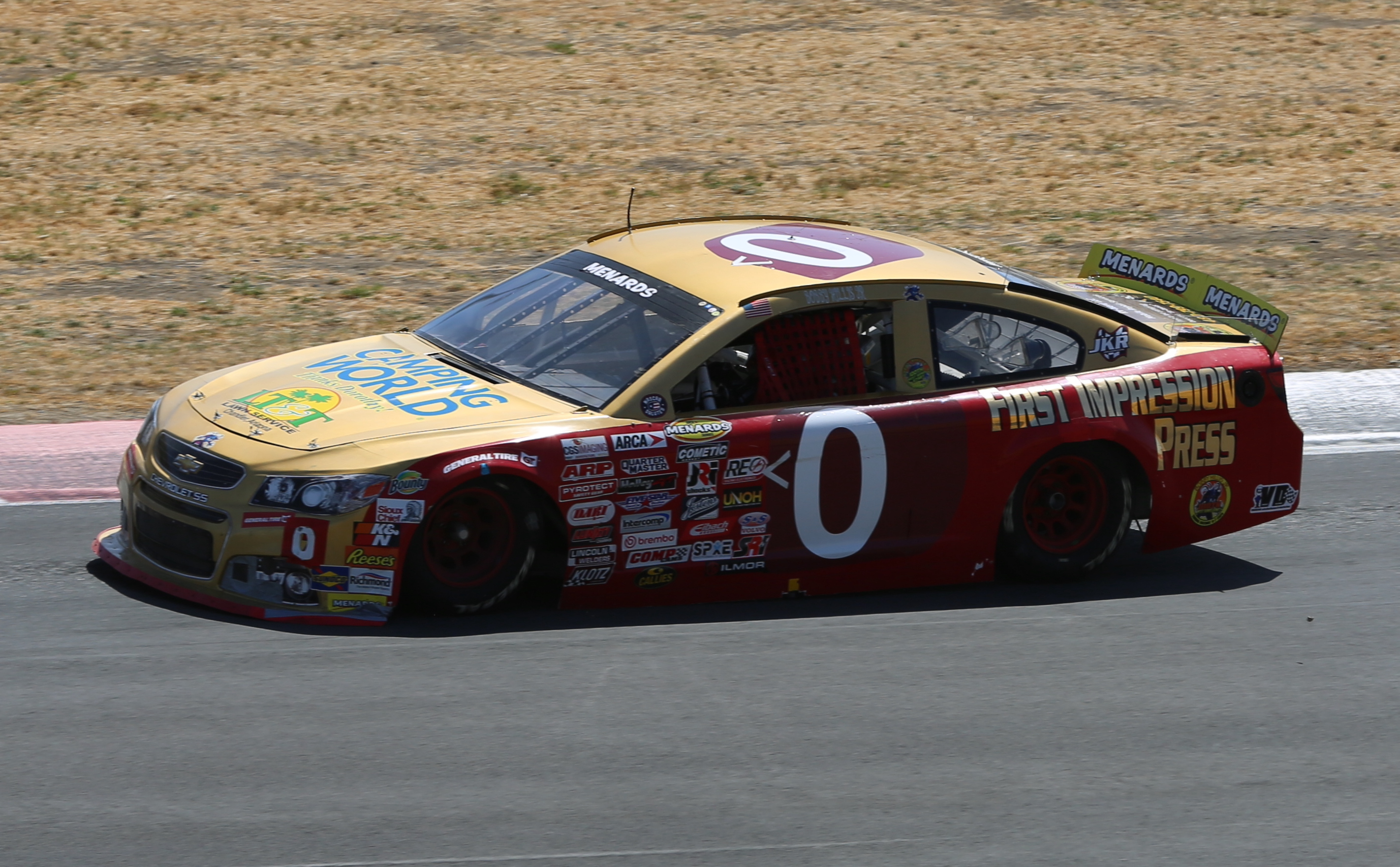
- Huffman's No. 0 ARCA car at Sonoma Raceway in 2024
- Born: Tony Lawrence Huffman; December 1, 1965 (age 60); Queen Creek, Arizona, U.S.

ARCA Menards Series West career
- 4 races run over 1 year
- Best finish: 28th (2024)
- First race: 2024 MMI Oil Workers 150 (Bakersfield)
- Last race: 2024 Desert Diamond Casino West Valley 100 (Phoenix)
Wins	Top tens	Poles
0	0	0
- Statistics up to date as of November 10, 2024.

Tony Lawrence Huffman (born December 1, 1965) is an American professional stock car racing driver and crew chief who last competed part-time in the ARCA Menards Series West, driving the No. 0 Chevrolet SS for Fierce Creature Racing, and served as the crew chief for Bobby Hillis Jr. in the No. 27 Chevrolet for FCR.

== Racing career ==
In 2024, it was revealed that Huffman would make his debut in the ARCA Menards Series West, driving the No. 0 Chevrolet for Fierce Creature Racing, whom he has served as a crew chief for regular driver Bobby Hillis Jr. the previous year. After setting the 23rd and slowest time in the lone practice session, he did not make a qualifying attempt and finished in 21st position after pulling into the pits on the opening lap so that he could resume his crew chief duties for Hillis Jr.; he was listed in the final results as a "did-not-start". He was then entered in the next race at Portland International Raceway, once again driving the No. 0 for FCR., where he was officially classified in 24th place after failing to set a time in practice or qualifying.

== Motorsports results ==
=== ARCA Menards Series West ===
(key) (Bold – Pole position awarded by qualifying time. Italics – Pole position earned by points standings or practice time. * – Most laps led. ** – All laps led.)

ARCA Menards Series West results
Year	Team	No.	Make	1	2	3	4	5	6	7	8	9	10	11	12	AMSWC	Pts	Ref
2024	Fierce Creature Racing	0	Chevy	PHO	KER; 21	PIR; 24	SON; 31	IRW; Wth	IRW; Wth	SHA	TRI	MAD	AAS	KER	PHO; 24	28th	76	
