= Danica Dart =

American racing driver (born 2007)

- Born: August 3, 2007 (age 19); Ephrata, Washington, U.S.

ARCA Menards Series career
- 1 race run over 1 year
- Best finish: 121st (2024)
- First race: 2024 General Tire 150 (Phoenix)
| Wins | Top tens | Poles |
|---|---|---|
| 0 | 0 | 0 |

ARCA Menards Series West career
- 4 races run over 1 year
- Best finish: 26th (2024)
- First race: 2024 General Tire 150 (Phoenix)
- Last race: 2024 NAPA Auto Care 150 (Tri-City)
| Wins | Top tens | Poles |
|---|---|---|
| 0 | 0 | 0 |
- Statistics up to date as of August 13, 2024.

Danica Dart (born August 3, 2007) is an American professional stock car racing driver who last competed part-time in the ARCA Menards Series West, driving the No. 07/11 Chevrolet/Ford for Kennealy Keller Motorsports.

== Racing career ==
Dart first began her racing career at the age of five, driving quarter-midgets before moving to bandeleros, pro, and super late models. It was during this time where she progressed to the Junior Late Model Series in Washington. After two years in competing in the class, she moved to the pro late model division in 2020 after the junior late model division ceased. In 2021, Dart won the late model championship at Stateline Speedway in Stateline, Idaho.

In late 2023, it was announced that Dart will drive the full ARCA Menards Series West schedule for the newly formed Kennealy Keller Motorsports. It was also during this time that she signed to the KKM Driver Development program, and will also run in select races in half a dozen super late model races.

In 2024, Dart attempted to make her debut in the West Series at the season opening race at Phoenix Raceway. After placing 36th in the lone practice session, she qualified for the race in 33rd and started in 40th on a provisional, but finished in 40th due to crash on the opening lap with Cody Kiemele, Michael Maples, and David Smith. At the next race at Kevin Harvick's Kern Raceway, she placed eighteenth in the lone practice session, and qualified in the same position, but suffered a crash in qualifying and ultimately did not start the race.

== Personal life ==
Dart is named after former NASCAR and IndyCar driver Danica Patrick.

== Motorsports results ==
=== ARCA Menards Series ===
(key) (Bold – Pole position awarded by qualifying time. Italics – Pole position earned by points standings or practice time. * – Most laps led.)

ARCA Menards Series results
| Year | Team | No. | Make | 1 | 2 | 3 | 4 | 5 | 6 | 7 | 8 | 9 | 10 | 11 | 12 | 13 | 14 | 15 | 16 | 17 | 18 | 19 | 20 | AMSC | Pts | Ref |
|---|---|---|---|---|---|---|---|---|---|---|---|---|---|---|---|---|---|---|---|---|---|---|---|---|---|---|
| 2024 | Kennealy Keller Motorsports | 07 | Chevy | DAY | PHO; 40 | TAL | DOV | KAN | CLT | IOW | MOH | BLN | IRP | SLM | ELK | MCH | ISF | MLW | DSF | GLN | BRI | KAN | TOL | 121st | 4 | |

==== ARCA Menards Series West ====
ARCA Menards Series West results
| Year | Team | No. | Make | 1 | 2 | 3 | 4 | 5 | 6 | 7 | 8 | 9 | 10 | 11 | 12 | AMSWC | Pts | Ref |
|---|---|---|---|---|---|---|---|---|---|---|---|---|---|---|---|---|---|---|
| 2024 | Kennealy Keller Motorsports | 07 | Chevy | PHO; 40 | | | | | | | | | | | | 26th | 86 | |
| 2024 | Kennealy Keller Motorsports | 11 | Ford | | KER; 22 | PIR | SON | IRW | | | | | | | | 26th | 86 | |
| 2024 | Kennealy Keller Motorsports | 11 | Chevy | | | | | | IRW; 14 | SHA | TRI; 14 | MAD | AAS | KER | PHO | 26th | 86 | |
