= Garrett Zacharias =

American racing driver (born 2004)

- Born: April 4, 2004 (age 22); Candor, New York, U.S.

ARCA Menards Series West career
- 2 races run over 1 year
- Best finish: 33rd (2024)
- First race: 2024 NAPA Auto Parts 150 presented by the West Coast Stock Car Motorsports Hall of Fame (Irwindale)
- Last race: 2024 West Coast Stock Car Motorsports Hall of Fame 150 presented by NAPA Auto Parts (Irwindale)
Wins	Top tens	Poles
0	0	0
- Statistics up to date as of July 7, 2024.

Garrett Zacharias (born April 4, 2004) is an American professional stock car racing driver who last competed part-time in the ARCA Menards Series West, driving the No. 31 Chevrolet for Rise Motorsports, and the No. 77 Toyota for Performance P–1 Motorsports.

== Racing career ==
Zacharias started his racing career at the age of nine, driving a Microd, before progressing up to Bandoleros in 2015, where he would compete in various events in Pennsylvania and his home state of New York. In 2019, he transitioned to Super Stocks, and began racing in various late model and super late model series in 2022.

In 2023, Zacharias participated in the pre-season test for the ARCA Menards Series at Daytona International Speedway, driving the No. 53 Ford for Emerling-Gase Motorsports, and placed 29th in the overall results between the two testing days.

In 2024, it was announced that Zacharias would attempt to make his debut in the ARCA Menards Series West at Phoenix Raceway, driving the No. 31 Chevrolet for Rise Motorsports. It would have also served as his debut in the main ARCA Menards Series, as it was a combination race with the West Series. After placing 32nd in the lone practice session, he failed to qualify after setting the 34th quickest time. One month later, it was revealed that Zacharias would drive the No. 77 Toyota for Performance P–1 Motorsports at Kevin Harvick's Kern Raceway, although he would withdraw from the event for personal reasons and was replaced by Cody Kiemele. He would finally make his series debut at Irwindale, where he finished the race in twelfth. He would run the second race of the doubleheader, finishing eighteenth.

== Personal life ==
Zacharias is the cousin of fellow racing driver Jimmy Zacharias, who competes in the NASCAR Whelen Modified Tour.

== Motorsports results ==
=== ARCA Menards Series ===
(key) (Bold – Pole position awarded by qualifying time. Italics – Pole position earned by points standings or practice time. * – Most laps led.)

ARCA Menards Series results
Year	Team	No.	Make	1	2	3	4	5	6	7	8	9	10	11	12	13	14	15	16	17	18	19	20	AMSC	Pts	Ref
2024	Rise Motorsports	31	Chevy	DAY	PHO; DNQ	TAL	DOV	KAN	CLT	IOW	MOH	BLN	IRP	SLM	ELK	MCH	ISF	MLW	DSF	GLN	BRI	KAN	TOL	N/A	0	

==== ARCA Menards Series West ====
ARCA Menards Series West results
Year	Team	No.	Make	1	2	3	4	5	6	7	8	9	10	11	12	AMSWC	Pts	Ref
2024	Rise Motorsports	31	Chevy	PHO; DNQ												33rd	58	
2024	Performance P–1 Motorsports	77	Toyota		KER; Wth	PIR	SON	IRW; 12	IRW; 18	SHA	TRI	MAD	AAS	KER	PHO	33rd	58	
