= Henry Barton (racing driver) =

American racing driver (born 2006)

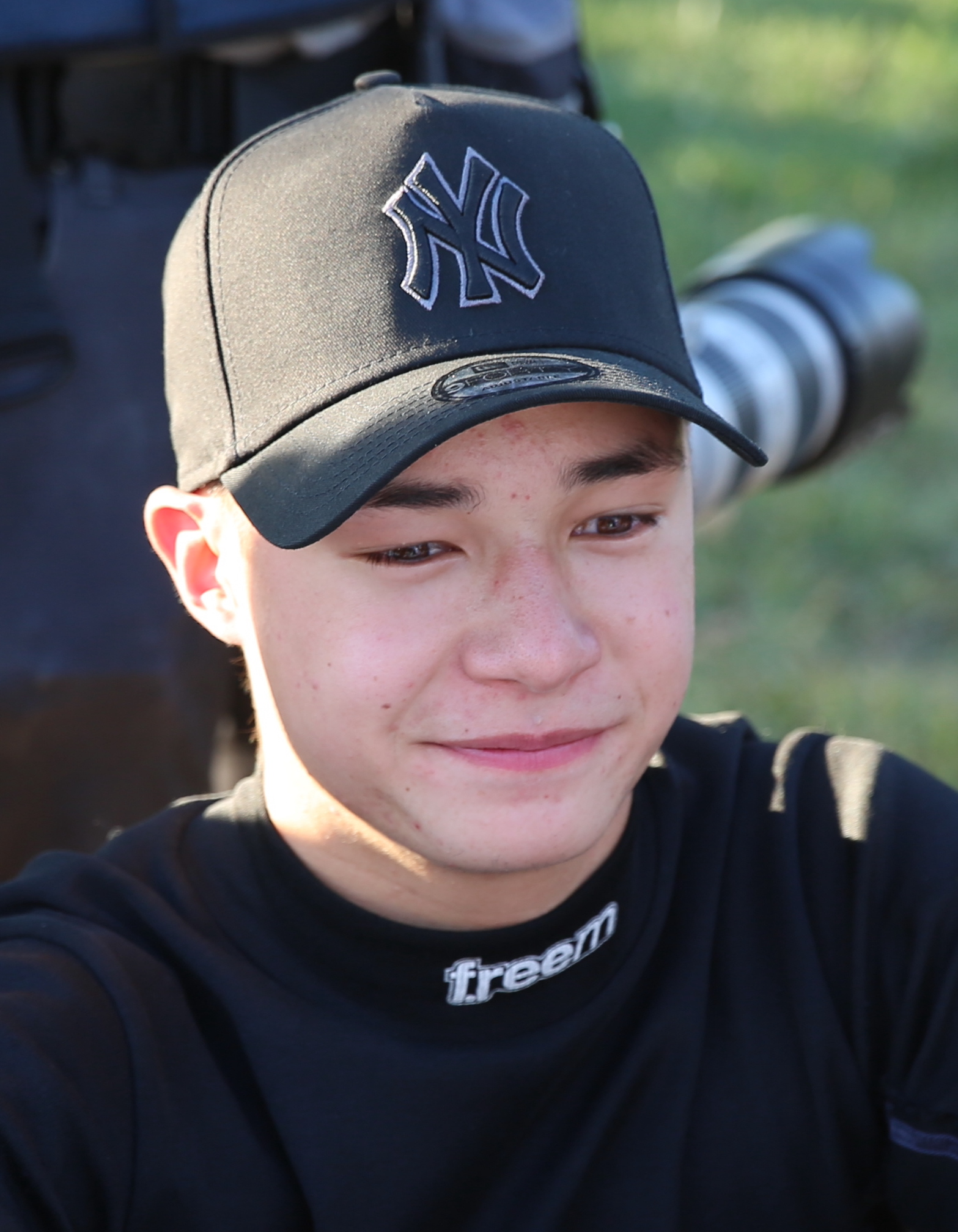
- Barton at All American Speedway in 2024
- Born: November 3, 2006 (age 20); San Francisco, California, U.S.

ARCA Menards Series West career
- 4 races run over 1 year
- Best finish: 22nd (2024)
- First race: 2024 MMI Oil Workers 150 (Kern)
- Last race: 2024 NAPA Auto Parts 150 presented by the West Coast Stock Car Motorsports Hall of Fame (Kern)
Wins	Top tens	Poles
0	2	0
- Statistics up to date as of November 2, 2025.

Henry Barton (born November 3, 2006) is an American professional stock car racing driver who last competed part-time in the ARCA Menards Series West, driving the No. 21 Toyota for Nascimento Motorsports, and the No. 6 Toyota for Jerry Pitts Racing.

== Racing career ==
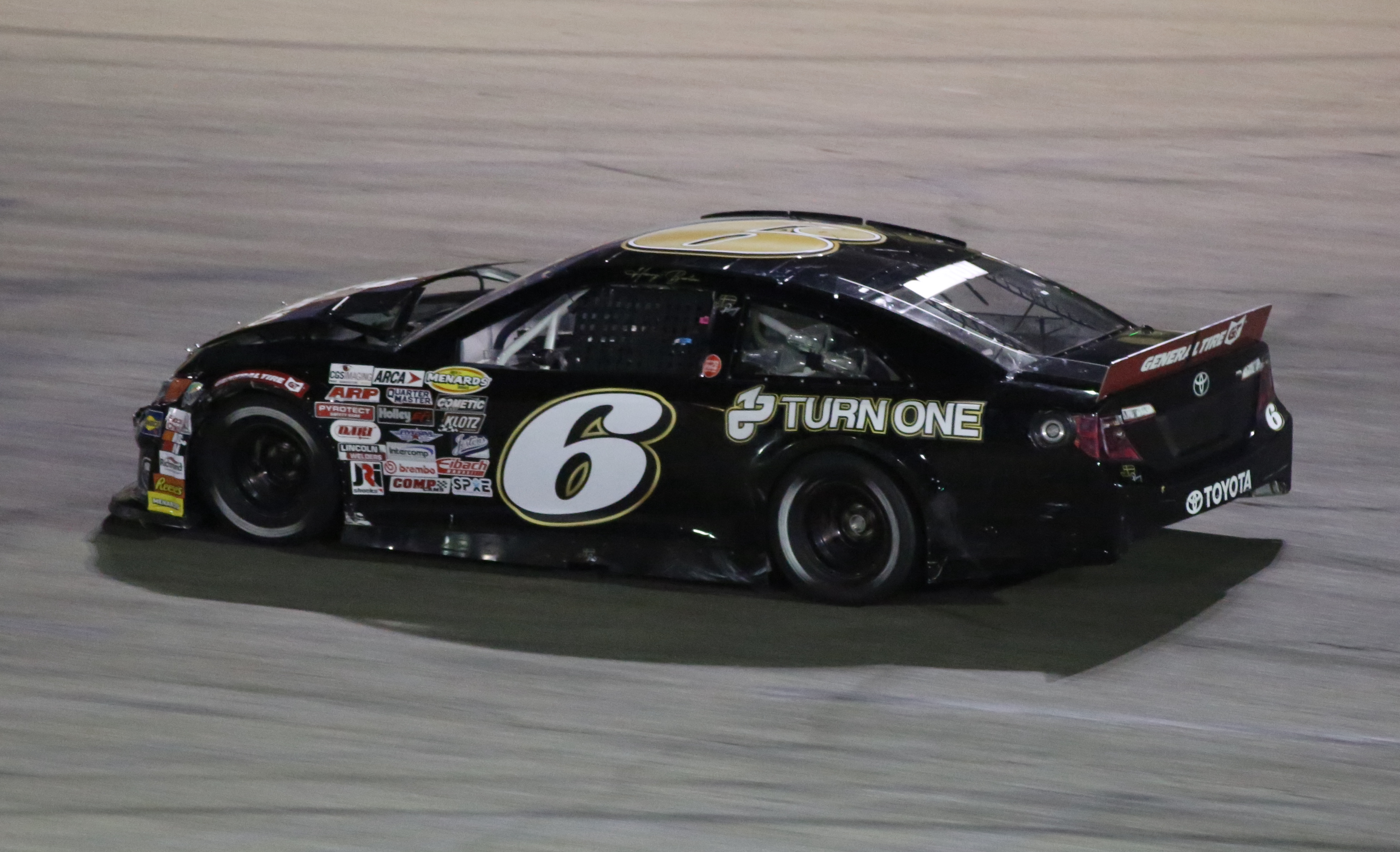
Barton's No. 6 car at All American Speedway in 2024.

Barton has previously competed in series such as the Legends Tour Series, where he won the championship in 2023, the NorCal Legend Series, and the SRL SPEARS Pro Late Model Series.

In 2024, it was announced that Barton will drive in select races in the ARCA Menards Series West and in various pro late model events for Nascimento Motorsports. He made his West Series debut at Kevin Harvick's Kern Raceway, driving the No. 21 Toyota, where after placing sixteenth in the lone practice session, he qualified in fourteenth but finished in twentieth position after running only two laps due to vibration issues.

== Motorsports results ==
=== ARCA Menards Series West ===
(key) (Bold – Pole position awarded by qualifying time. Italics – Pole position earned by points standings or practice time. * – Most laps led. ** – All laps led.)

ARCA Menards Series West results
Year	Team	No.	Make	1	2	3	4	5	6	7	8	9	10	11	12	AMSWC	Pts	Ref
2024	Nascimento Motorsports	21	Toyota	PHO	KER; 20	PIR	SON	IRW	IRW	SHA	TRI					22nd	126	
2024	Jerry Pitts Racing	6	Toyota									MAD; 8	AAS; 9	KER; 13	PHO	22nd	126	
