= Michael Killen =

American racing driver

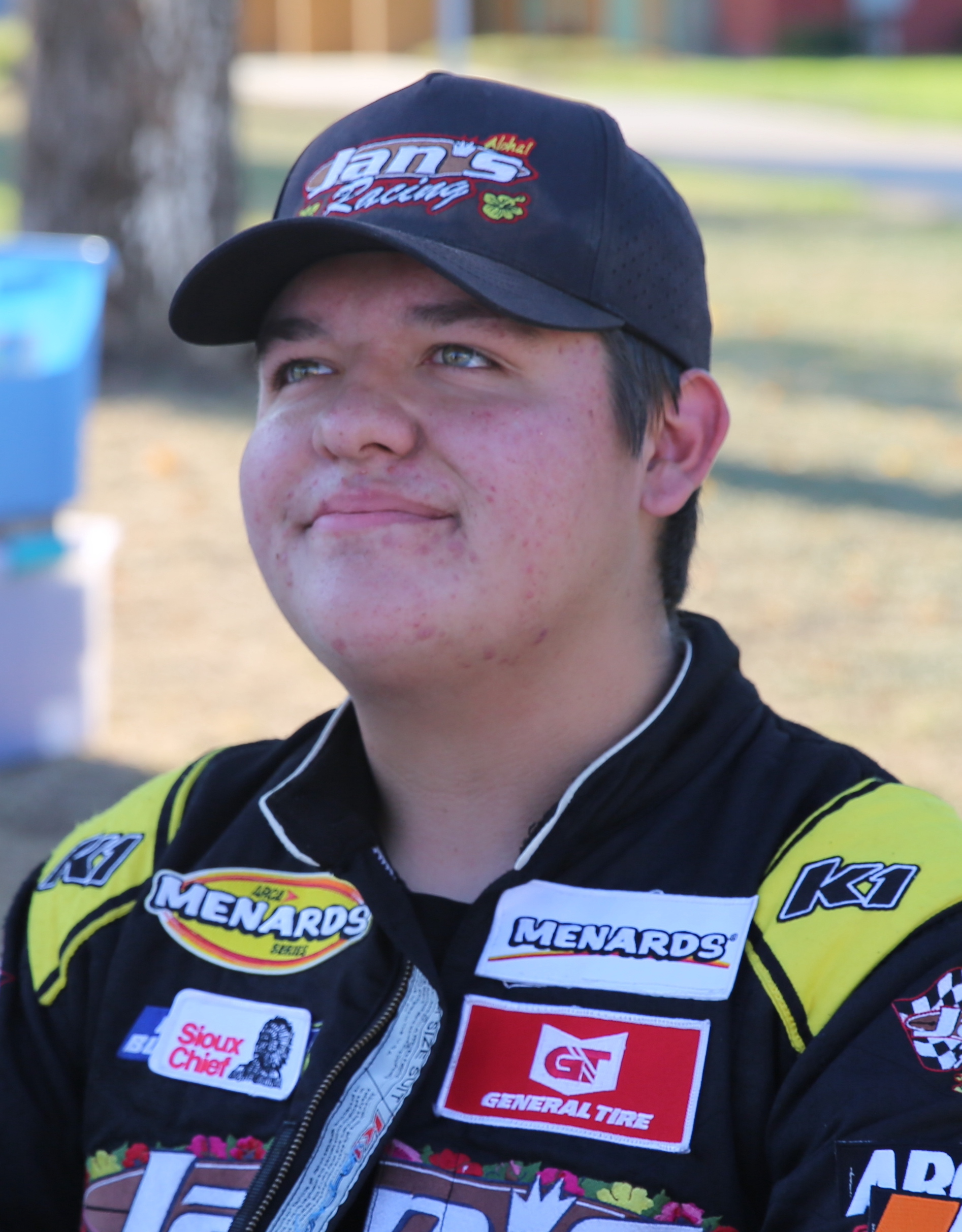
- Killen at All American Speedway in 2024
- Born: October 1, 2006 (age 20); La Verne, California, U.S.

ARCA Menards Series West career
- 2 races run over 1 year
- Best finish: 21st (2024)
- First race: 2024 NAPA Auto Parts 150 presented by the West Coast Stock Car Motorsports Hall of Fame (Irwindale)
- Last race: 2024 West Coast Stock Car Motorsports Hall of Fame 150 presented by NAPA Auto Parts (Irwindale)
Wins	Top tens	Poles
0	1	0
- Statistics up to date as of November 2, 2025.

Michael "Mikey" Killen Jr. (born October 1, 2006) is an American professional stock car racing driver who last competed part-time in the ARCA Menards Series West, driving the No. 9 Ford for Jan's Towing Racing.

== Racing career ==
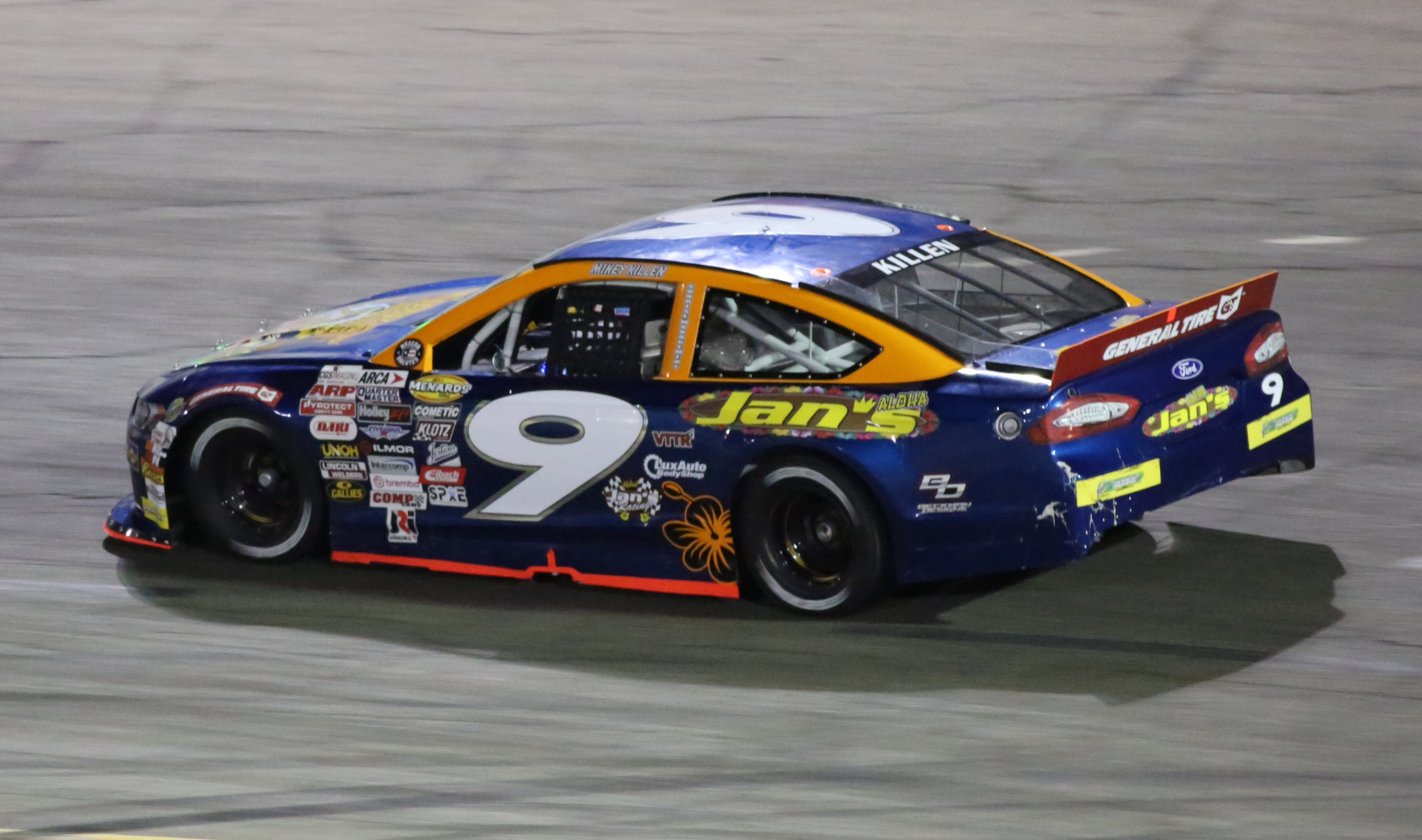
Killen's No. 9 car at All American Speedway in 2024.

In 2024, Killen made his debut in the ARCA Menards Series West at the double-header weekend at Irwindale Speedway, driving the No. 9 Ford for Jan's Towing Racing. In the Thursday race, he set the slowest time in the lone practice session, qualified in sixteenth, and finished the race six laps down in thirteenth place. In the Saturday race, Killen set the thirteenth quickest time in practice, qualified in fifteenth, and finished two laps down in twelfth place.

== Motorsports results ==
=== ARCA Menards Series West ===
(key) (Bold – Pole position awarded by qualifying time. Italics – Pole position earned by points standings or practice time. * – Most laps led. ** – All laps led.)

ARCA Menards Series West results
Year	Team	No.	Make	1	2	3	4	5	6	7	8	9	10	11	12	AMSWC	Pts	Ref
2024	Jan's Towing Racing	9	Ford	PHO	KER	PIR	SON	IRW; 13	IRW; 12	SHA	TRI	MAD; 10	AAS; 13	KER	PHO	21st	128	
