= Tyler Brown (racing driver) =

American racing driver

- Born: May 23, 1999 (age 27); Kennewick, Washington, U.S.

ARCA Menards Series West career
- 1 race run over 1 year
- Best finish: 51st (2025)
- First race: 2025 NAPA Auto Care 150 (Tri-City)
Wins	Top tens	Poles
0	1	0
- Statistics up to date as of November 2, 2025.

Tyler Brown (born May 23, 1999) is an American professional stock car racing driver who last competed part-time in the ARCA Menards Series West, driving the No. 31 Toyota for Rise Motorsports.

== Racing career ==
Brown began racing at the age of four, where he drove at the Tri-City Kart Club. He then went on to compete in various late model series' such as the Northwest Super Late Model Series, the Tri-State Challenge Series Pro Late Models Series, and the Northwest Mini Stock Tour.

In 2025, it was revealed that Brown would make his debut in the ARCA Menards Series West, driving the No. 31 Toyota for Rise Motorsports. After placing ninth in the lone practice session, he qualified in tenth, and finished one lap down in ninth place.

== Personal life ==
Brown is the great-grandson of fellow racing driver Ed Brown, who competed in the NASCAR Winston West Series from 1995 to 1972.

== Motorsports results ==
=== ARCA Menards Series West ===
(key) (Bold – Pole position awarded by qualifying time. Italics – Pole position earned by points standings or practice time. * – Most laps led. ** – All laps led.)

ARCA Menards Series West results
Year	Team	No.	Make	1	2	3	4	5	6	7	8	9	10	11	12	AMSWC	Pts	Ref
2025	Rise Motorsports	31	Toyota	KER	PHO	TUC	CNS	KER	SON	TRI; 9	PIR	AAS	MAD	LVS	PHO	51st	35	
