= Jade Avedisian =

American racing driver (born 2006)

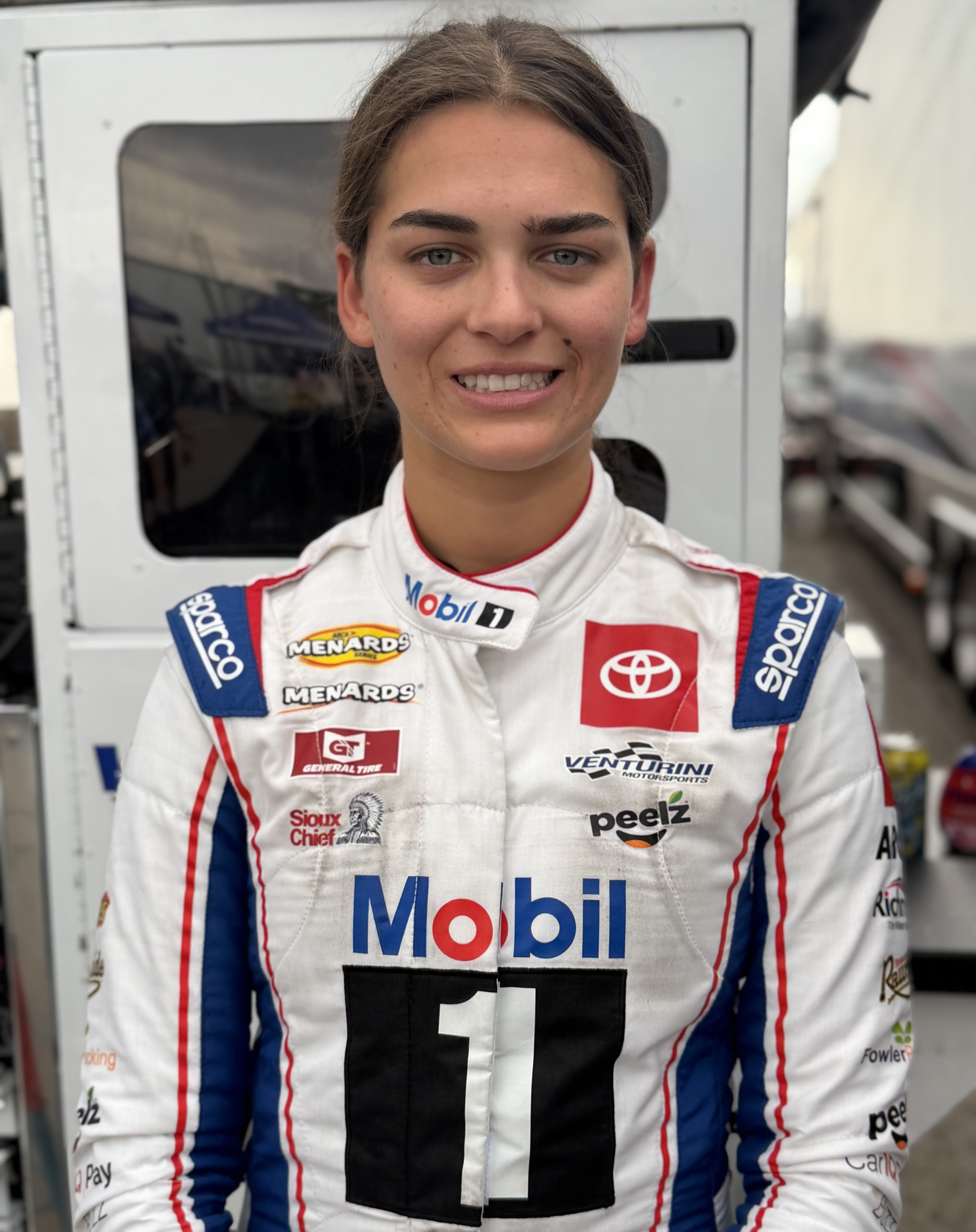
- Avedisian in 2025
- Born: September 14, 2006 (age 20); Clovis, California, U.S.

ARCA Menards Series career
- 7 races run over 2 years
- ARCA no., team: No. TBA (Nitro Motorsports)
- Best finish: 24th (2026)
- First race: 2025 Southern Illinois 100 (DuQuoin)
- Last race: 2026 Bush's Best 200 (Bristol)
Wins	Top tens	Poles
0	5	0

ARCA Menards Series East career
- 2 races run over 1 year
- Best finish: 35th (2026)
- First race: 2026 JR & CO. 150 (Iowa)
- Last race: 2026 Bush's Best 200 (Bristol)
Wins	Top tens	Poles
0	2	0

ARCA Menards Series West career
- 7 races run over 2 years
- Best finish: 18th (2026)
- First race: 2025 Star Nursery 150 (Las Vegas Bullring)
- Last race: 2026 Desert Diamond Casino West Valley 100 (Phoenix)
Wins	Top tens	Poles
0	2	1
- Statistics up to date as of November 2, 2026.

Jade Avedisian (born September 14, 2006) is an American professional auto racing driver. She currently competes part-time in the ARCA Menards Series, driver for Nitro Motorsports.

Raised in Clovis, California, Avedisian began racing quarter midgets at the age of four as a hobby. After a two-year break, she returned to paved quarter midget racing at the age of seven. Avedisian moved to dirt racing three years later at the age of ten, where over the next five years, she was successful in micro sprint races across the West Coast. After being signed by Chad Boat's team in 2021, she progressed to national midget car racing, earning her maiden win in the Xtreme Midget Outlaw Series (XMOS) the following year. Switching to Keith Kunz Motorsports for dirt racing in 2023, she won the XMOS championship. After signing with Toyota Racing Development (TRD) later in the year, she gradually returned to paved racing over the next two years, racing in sports cars, late models, and stock cars for a variety of teams.

== Early life and family background ==
Avedisian was born on September 14, 2006, and raised in Clovis, California. She is the daughter of Ryan Avedisian and Kim Avedisian. Her father is a businessman and the owner of a swimming pool business in the nearby city of Fresno. She is of Armenian heritage, with her father being Armenian. She was born alongside a younger sister named Kenzie. According to Avedisian, she was homeschooled, having switched from attending public school to home-school sometime in either 2019 or 2020 to focus on her racing career. During her years in public school, she tried out and played a variety of sports, eventually choosing to focus on auto racing at the age of ten.

== Racing career ==
=== Early racing career ===
At four years old, Jade's father, Ryan, bought her a quarter midget to race around in parking lots and "to just play around" during her free time. Ryan had previously worked on dirt sprint cars for various teams. After a two-year hiatus due to a lack of interest, at the age of seven, she regained her interest and began racing on purpose-built racetracks in quarter midgets. In an interview for a documentary produced by Mobil 1, Avedisian stated that during her first few races, she "wrecked and I think I sprained my hand or something". Avedisian later stated that she knew she wanted to pursue a racing career because despite sustaining injuries, she wanted to go to the racetrack the following day. In 2015, she started racing in national series, where she won gained attention from The Fresno Bee after she won three national quarter midget events in the summer of that year at the age of eight. At the age of nine, she won her first national quarter midget championship.

At ten years old, Avedisian moved her focus from paved racing to dirt racing. In 2017, she won the USAC Junior Micro Sprint championship. Two years later, she had a breakout year in micro sprints, winning 11 races across the West Coast. In the process, she won the Restricted division track championships at Keller Auto Raceway and Lemoore Raceway. In an interview, Avedisian stated that the sudden success was due to an increased amount of seat time and knowledge compared to 2018. The following year, she won the Restricted division in that year's Tulsa Shootout. In July 2020, Avedisian won the John Hinck Memorial, winning a purse of $20,000.

=== 2021–2024: Dirt developmental years ===
After winning the John Hinck Memorial, midget car racing team owner and former racing driver Chad Boat called Avedisian's family to inquire about Avedisian potentially joining his team, CB Industries. Avedisian was officially announced as part of Boat's team in March 2021, joining Ryan Timms and Brent Crews. On March 19, she made her debut in the POWRi National Midget League, finishing in 16th at a race at the Monarch Motor Speedway. Eight months later, she made her debut in the USAC Midget National Championship, finishing in 16th in a feature race at the Arizona Speedway on November 12.

In 2022, Avedisian ran a full-time schedule in the Xtreme Midget Outlaw Series (XMOS) for CB Industries. After failing to qualify for the first two feature races at Millbridge Speedway, in her debut feature appearance on June 26, she won her maiden victory at Jacksonville Speedway in a conjunction race between XMOS and the National Midget League, becoming the first woman to win in the National Midget League. After winning the season-ending race at I-44 Riverside Speedway on October 15, she finished seventh in the series' standings. On November 19, Avedisian was involved in a crash with driver Tanner Carrick during a USAC National Midget race; after her wreck, she walked towards Carrick's car and fist-bumped him, which was viewed as unusual by some in the motorsports media industry. In interviews, she stated that the reason for fist-bumping rather than fighting Carrick was to protect her public image and to prevent putting her sponsors "in a bad light".

At the beginning of 2023, Avedisian became the youngest woman to start in the A-main of the Chili Bowl Nationals, finishing 18th in her debut appearance at the event. Shortly after her appearance at the Chili Bowl, on February 1, she moved to Mooresville, North Carolina, to focus more on her racing career. A week after, Avedisian announced plans to race with Keith Kunz Motorsports (KKM) in February to race full-time in their No. 71 entry for that year's XMOS season. According to Kunz, she had been on "top of Toyota’s and [my] radar" after her 2022 season and her Chili Bowl A-main appearance. In the 29-race season, she won five races, achieved 16 top-fives, and 26 top-tens. For a majority of the season, she was in a battle with Zach Daum in the driver's championship. With assistance from an inconsistent season in terms of results from Daum, at season's end in October, she won the championship by 59 points over Daum. A month after winning the XMOS championship, Avedisian signed a multi-year contract to join Toyota Racing Development's (TRD) driver development program.

For the 2024 season, as part of the TRD program, she raced in a variety of national dirt racing series for KKM. In addition, she raced full-time in the Toyota GR Cup, a road racing series, for Nitro Motorsports to gain more experience with paved racing. In her full-time season in the Toyota GR Cup, she earned a best race finish of fourth in a race at the Circuit of the Americas. (Note: "Jade Avedisian Earns Career Best GR Cup Series Result at Circuit of the Americas". Nitro Motorsports (Press release).) However, she failed to score any points in any other race, finishing in 17th in the driver's standings with 12 points. In September 2024, during a race at the Indianapolis Motor Speedway's dirt track, Avedisian sustained a concussion. According to Avedisian in a 2025 interview, she stated that her concussion had caused damage to a brain nerve, which affected her thinking skills. Starting in November, due to the concussion, she took a hiatus from racing for the rest of 2024 to recover. Throughout the 2024 season, Avedisian was included in several lists for top future NASCAR prospects, including for Fox Sports' Bob Pockrass, The Athletic's Jordan Bianchi, and FloRacing's Brandon Paul.

=== 2025–2026: Switch to pavement ===
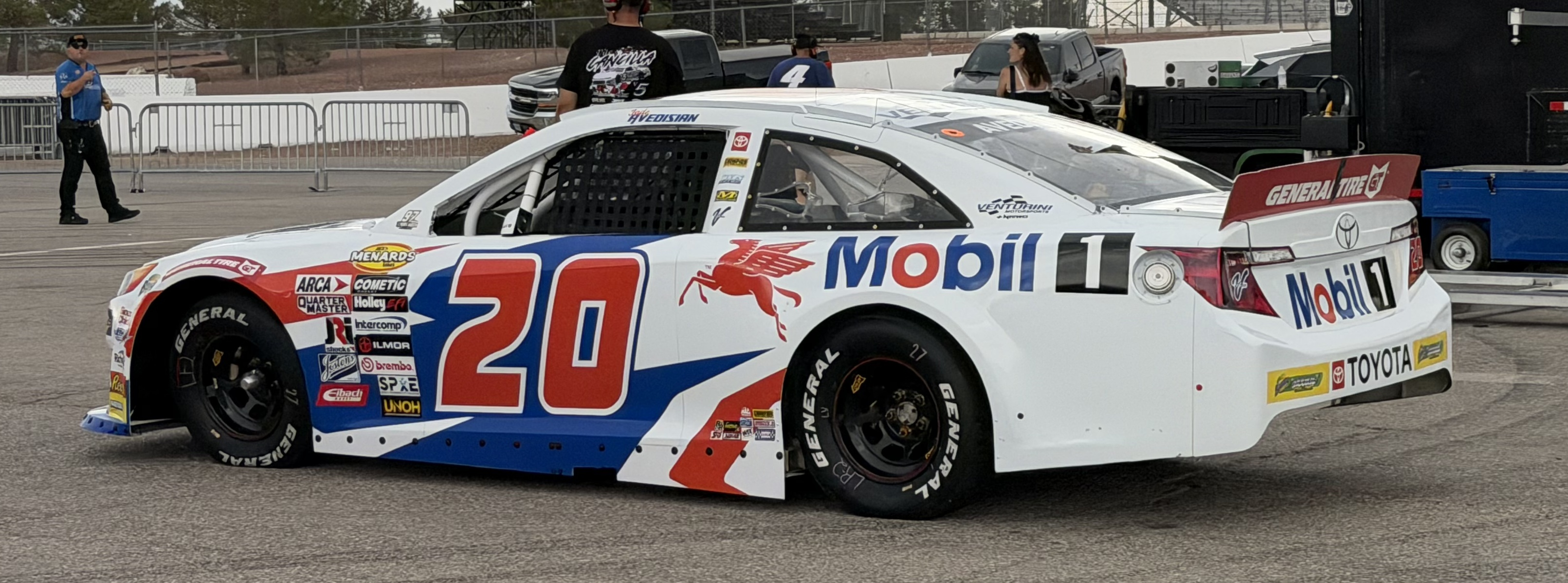
Avedisian's ARCA Racing Series car at the 2025 Star Nursery 150.

In 2025, Avedisian expanded her stock car racing endeavors. She made her 2025 season debut at New Smyrna Speedway for the track-sanctioned World Series of Asphalt Stock Car Racing series in early February, finishing fourth in the Pro Late Model division standings. On March 1, Avedisian became the first woman to win a race in the CARS Pro Late Model Tour, winning a race at the New River All-American Speedway after initial winner T. J. DeCaire was disqualified in technical inspection. In May, she made her debut in super late models, finishing 14th in a race at the Nashville Fairgrounds Speedway on May 4 for an ASA Southern Super Series race. Shortly after achieving her first podium in the Trans-Am TA2 Series on July 27, she announced her national NASCAR touring series debut for Venturini Motorsports in the ARCA Racing Series at a race on the DuQuoin State Fairgrounds Racetrack, a dirt track. In her ARCA debut on August 31, she placed 17th after suffering mechanical issues during the race and later sustaining terminal damage in a crash, failing to finish the race. She later made her debut in the ARCA Racing Series West at the Las Vegas Motor Speedway Bullring on October 10, finishing in 12th. Afterwards, she ran at the season ending race at Phoenix Raceway, this time driving the No. 13 Toyota for Central Coast Racing as a replacement for Tanner Reif, who left CCM after Las Vegas.

Avedisian returned to the ARCA Racing Series for 2026, racing a part-time schedule with Nitro Motorsports.

== Personal life ==
Outside of auto racing, Avedisian pursues several hobbies, including snowboarding, wakeboarding, and golf. According to Avedisian, her favorite drivers include Kyle Larson and Christopher Bell.

== Motorsports career results ==
=== Stock car career summary ===
Season	Series	Team	Races	Wins	Top 5	Top 10	Points	Position
2025	CARS Pro Late Model Tour	Wilson Motorsports	7	1	3	5	252	8th
2025	ARCA Menards Series West	Venturini Motorsports	1	0	0	0	107	21st
2025	ARCA Menards Series West	Central Coast Racing	1	0	0	0	107	21st
2025	ARCA Menards Series	Venturini Motorsports	1	0	0	0	27	117th
2026	ASA STARS National Tour	Wilson Motorsports	11	0	4	7	592	**3rd**
2026	ARCA Menards Series West	Nitro Motorsports	3	0	0	2	144	18th
2026	ARCA Menards Series West	Central Coast Racing	2	0	0	0	144	18th
2026	ARCA Menards Series East	Nitro Motorsports	2	0	0	2	71	35th
2026	ARCA Menards Series	Nitro Motorsports	6	0	0	5	198	24th

=== ARCA Menards Series ===
(key) (Bold – Pole position awarded by qualifying time. Italics – Pole position earned by points standings or practice time. * – Most laps led. ** – All laps led.)

ARCA Menards Series results
Year	Team	No.	Make	1	2	3	4	5	6	7	8	9	10	11	12	13	14	15	16	17	18	19	20	AMSC	Pts	Ref
2025	Venturini Motorsports	25	Toyota	DAY	PHO	TAL	KAN	CLT	MCH	BLN	ELK	LRP	DOV	IRP	IOW	GLN	ISF	MAD	DSF; 17	BRI	SLM	KAN	TOL	117th	27	
2026	Nitro Motorsports	90	Toyota	DAY	PHO; 28																			24th	198	
2026	Nitro Motorsports	15	Toyota			KAN; 7	TAL	GLN	TOL	MCH	POC; 8	BER	ELK	CHI; 6	LRP	IRP	IOW; 10	ISF	MAD	DSF	SLM	BRI; 7	KAN	24th	198	

==== ARCA Menards Series East ====
ARCA Menards Series East results
Year	Team	No.	Make	1	2	3	4	5	6	7	8	AMSEC	Pts	Ref
2026	Nitro Motorsports	15	Toyota	HCY	CAR	NSV	TOL	IRP	FRS	IOW; 10	BRI; 7	35th	71	

==== ARCA Menards Series West ====
ARCA Menards Series West results
Year	Team	No.	Make	1	2	3	4	5	6	7	8	9	10	11	12	13	AMSWC	Pts	Ref
2025	Venturini Motorsports	20	Toyota	KER	PHO	TUC	CNS	KER	SON	TRI	PIR	AAS	MAD	LVS; 12			21st	107	
2025	Central Coast Racing	13	Toyota												PHO; 19		21st	107	
2026	Nitro Motorsports	70	Toyota	**KER**; 8											PHO; 9	KER	18th	144	
2026	Nitro Motorsports	90	Toyota		PHO; 28												18th	144	
2026	Central Coast Racing	13	Toyota			TUC; 17	SHA	CNS	TRI; 15	SON	PIR	AAS	MAD	LVS			18th	144	

=== CARS Pro Late Model Tour ===
(key)

CARS Pro Late Model Tour results
Year	Team	No.	Make	1	2	3	4	5	6	7	8	9	10	11	12	13	CPLMTC	Pts	Ref
2025	Wilson Motorsports	24	Toyota	AAS; 1	CDL	OCS; 2	ACE	NWS; 17	CRW	HCY; 4	HCY	AND; 10	FLC; 7	SBO	TCM; Wth	NWS; 11	8th	252	

=== ASA STARS National Tour ===
(key) (Bold – Pole position awarded by qualifying time. Italics – Pole position earned by points standings or practice time. * – Most laps led. ** – All laps led.)

ASA STARS National Tour results
Year	Team	No.	Make	1	2	3	4	5	6	7	8	9	10	11	ASNTC	Pts	Ref
2026	Wilson Motorsports	24	Toyota	NSM; 7	FIF; 5	HCY; 15	SLG; 8	MAD; 16	NPS; 15	OWO; 3	TRI; 6	WIN; 9	NSV; 3	NSM; 4	3rd	592	
