= Nick Joanides =

American racing driver (1970–2025)

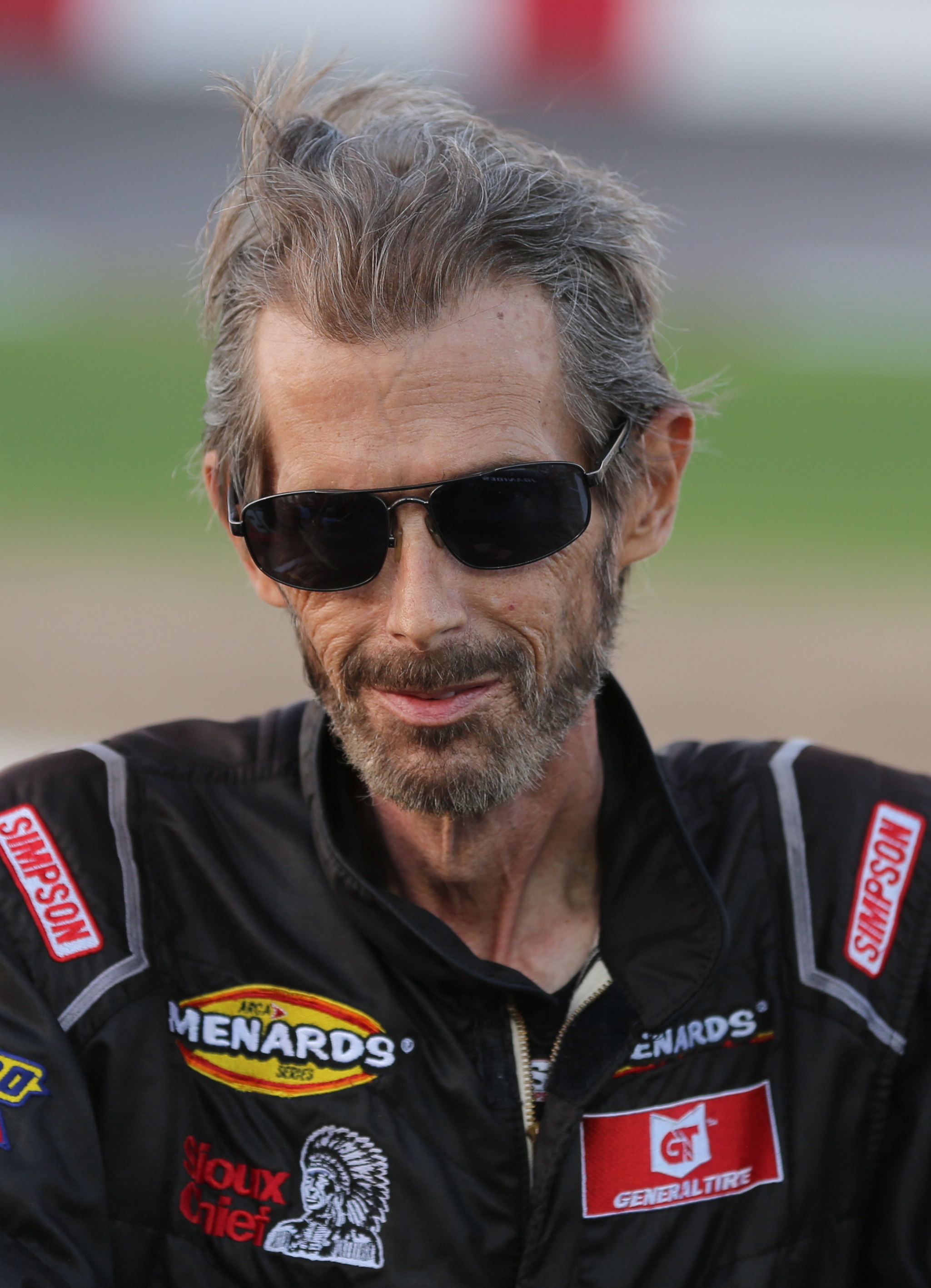
- Joanides in 2025
- Born: Nicholas Joanides; June 17, 1970; Woodland Hills, California, U.S.
- Died: December 5, 2025 (aged 55)

ARCA Menards Series career
- 1 race run over 1 year
- Best finish: 107th (2024)
- First race: 2024 General Tire 150 (Phoenix)
Wins	Top tens	Poles
0	0	0

ARCA Menards Series East career
- 1 race run over 1 year
- Best finish: 53rd (2006)
- First race: 2006 New England 125 (Loudon)
Wins	Top tens	Poles
0	0	0

ARCA Menards Series West career
- 38 races run over 9 years
- Best finish: 10th (2024)
- First race: 2004 King Taco 200 (Fontana)
- Last race: 2025 Star Nursery 150 (Las Vegas Bullring)
Wins	Top tens	Poles
0	14	1
- Statistics up to date as of October 11, 2025.

Nicholas Joanides (June 17, 1970 – December 5, 2025) was an American professional stock car racing driver who last competed part-time in the ARCA Menards Series West, driving the No. 77 Toyota for Performance P–1 Motorsports. He also competed in the NASCAR Nationwide Series, ARCA Menards Series East (when it was the NASCAR Busch East Series), and the now-defunct AutoZone Elite Division Southwest & Midwest Series in the past.

== Racing career ==
In 2009, Joanides became the first driver in the history of Toyota Speedway at Irwindale to win championships in the top two premier divisions, and he did so in the same season. 2009 saw Joanides win the NASCAR AC-Delco Super Late Model Championship, NASCAR Auto Club Late Model Championship, NASCAR Whelen All-American Series California State Championship, and the Lucas Oil Slick Mist 200 Championship. He ended up third in the NASCAR All-American Series National standings. In total, Joanides competed in 42 races and scored seventeen wins, 33 podiums, 37 top fives, and 41 top-ten finishes.

On October 17, Joanides announced that he would be joining Rick Ware Racing for his NASCAR Nationwide Series debut at Memphis Motorsports Park on October 24, 2009.

Joanides retired from full-time racing following the 2010 season. He came out of retirement late in 2015. Through the first 35 events, posted fifteen wins and 26 top-five finishes. In 2016, an engine failure in the third event of the 2016 season resulted in a 32 point loss. Joanides would go on to finish second in the final point standings, 24 points shy of the championship.

Joanides returned to Performance P-1 Motorsports in 2018 for a part-time schedule in NASCAR K&N Pro Series West, scoring a top-five finish at All American Speedway in Roseville, California.

Joanides returned to the team in 2021 for a one-race deal in the 4th of July weekend race at Irwindale Speedway, posting the team's only top-ten finish of the season.

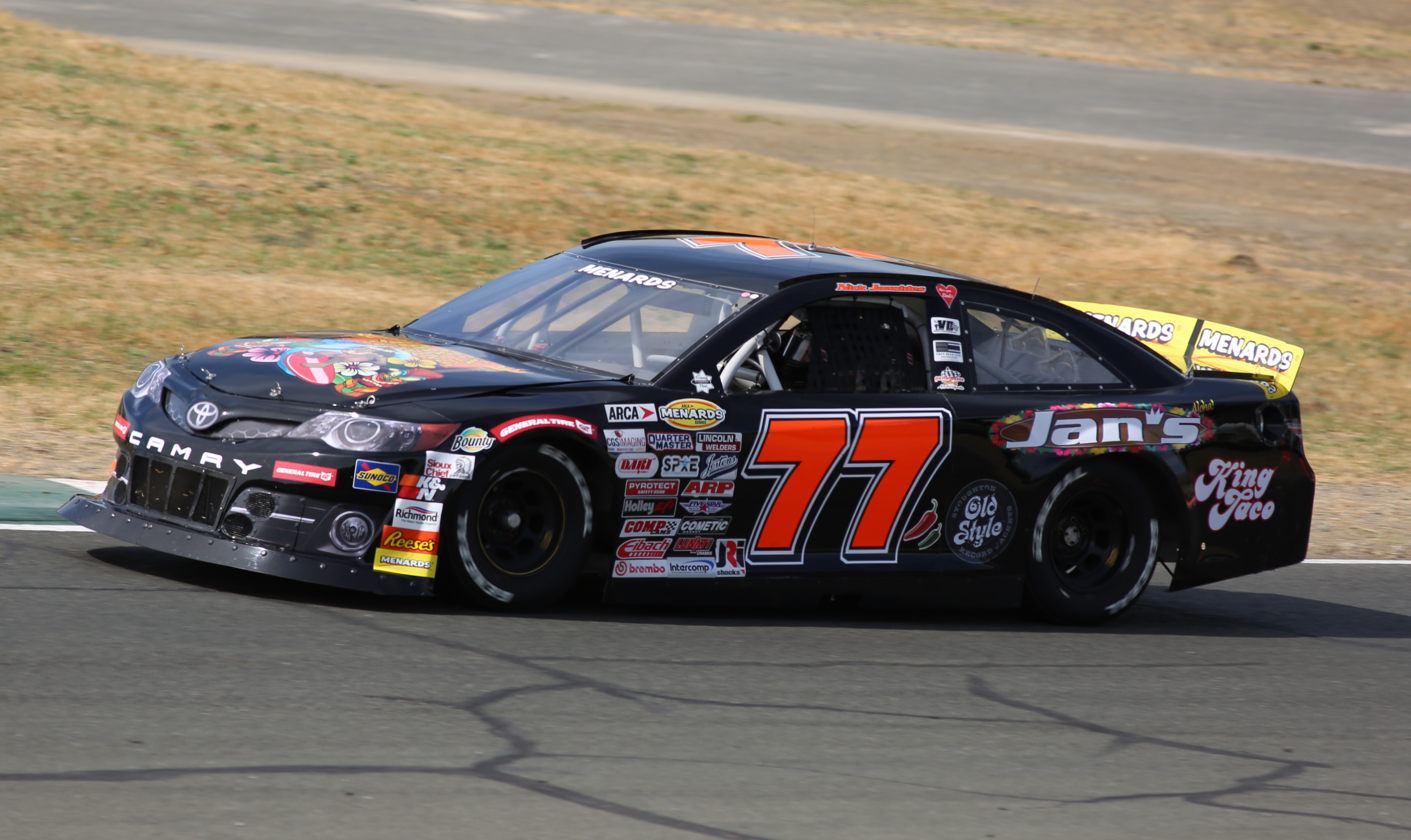
Joanides' No. 77 ARCA car at Sonoma in 2023

Joanides had one scheduled start in 2022 for Performance P-1 Motorsports in the March Race at Irwindale. With no other race on his schedule, Joanides was called by team owner Lowden Motorsports late in the afternoon to fill in for their driver, who was suffering from food poisoning. Joanides arrived just before the race, with no practice, qualifying or power steering, brought home The Hard Charger award by passing the most cars in coming from last on the grid to finish eleventh. On September 17, 2022, Joanides entered his first Spears SRL Pro-Late Model Series race and came away with the win. He nearly backed it up a year later, falling just short to finish second in the same event.

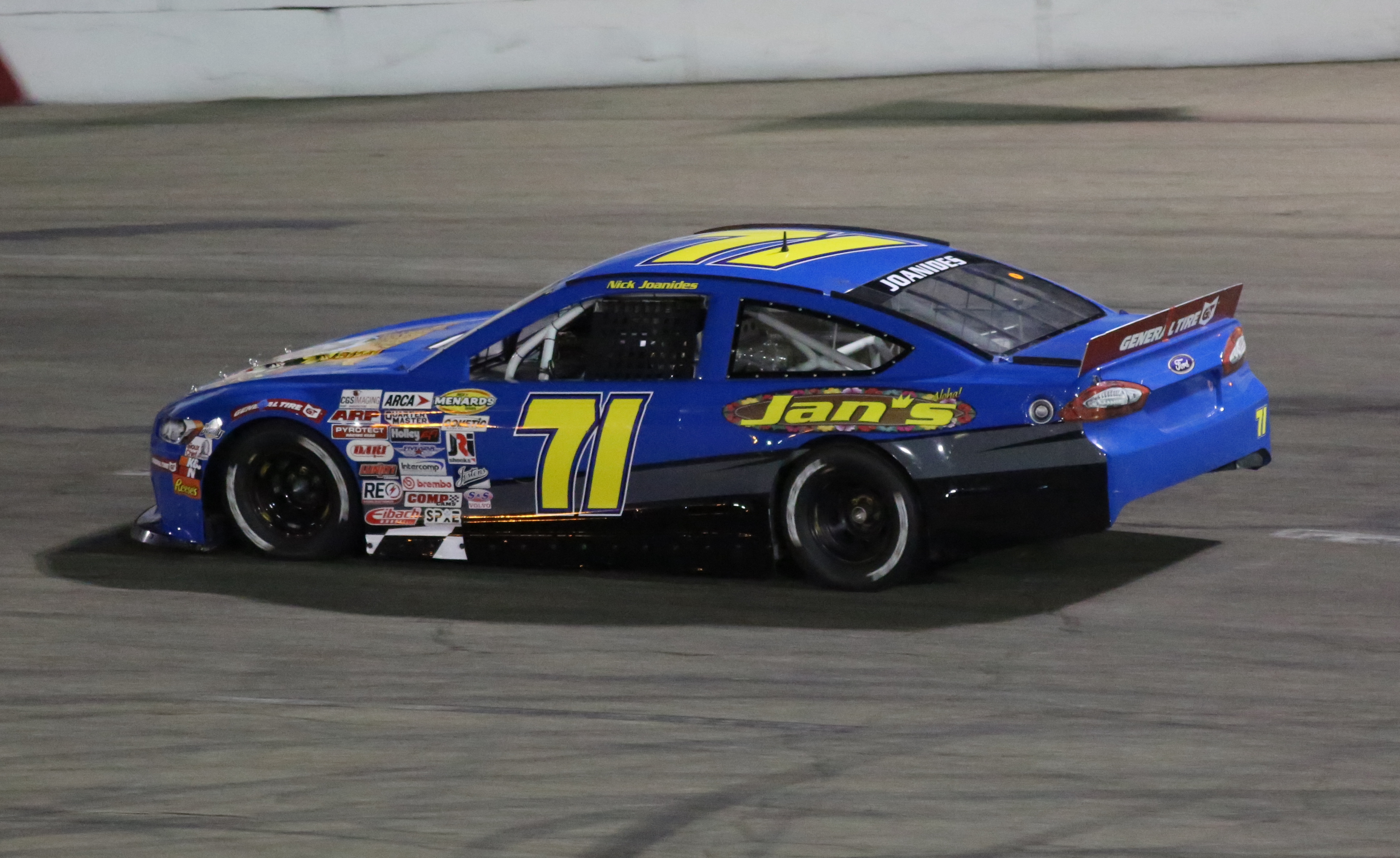
Joanides' No. 71 car at All American Speedway in 2023

In 2023, Joanides competed in five of the first eight ARCA West series races for No. 77 PP1M Team. On September 25, 2023, it was announced that Joanides would drive the No. 71 Ford owned by himself, beginning at All-American Speedway, the site of his career best ARCA West Series finish.

In 2024, Joanides got up to full-time with Jan's Towing Racing. Joanides posted two top-fives and five top-ten finishes. He also won his first and only Pole Award at Irwindale Speedway on July 6. Joanides would miss the final four races of the season due to health issues, but returned for the exhibition race at Irwindale Speedway in December.

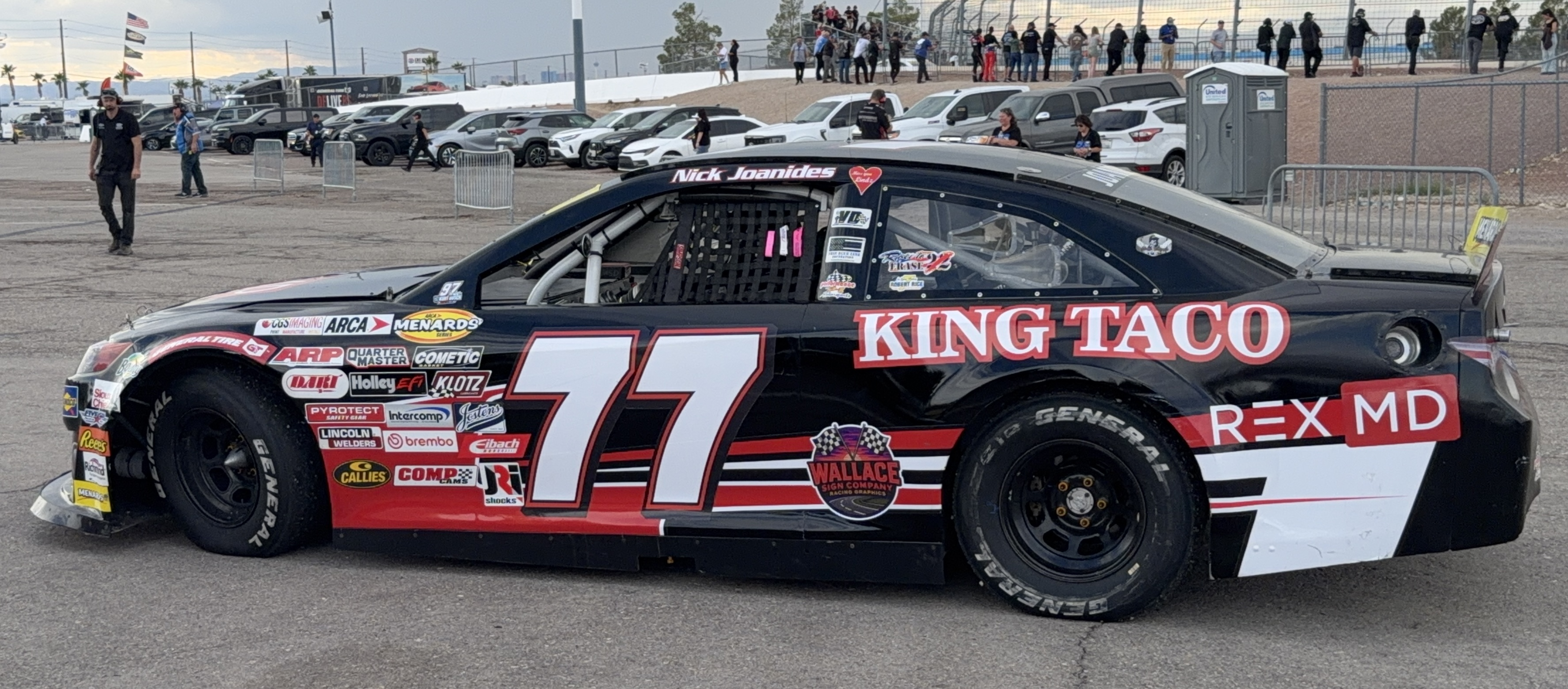
Joanides' No. 77 ARCA car at the Las Vegas Motor Speedway Bullring in 2025, two months before his death

In 2025, Joanides made three starts for PP1M and the No. 77, getting a best finish of fourteenth at Madera Speedway.

== Death ==
Joanides died on December 5, 2025, at the age of 55.

== Motorsports career results ==
=== NASCAR ===
(key) (Bold – Pole position awarded by qualifying time. Italics – Pole position earned by points standings or practice time. * – Most laps led.)

==== Nationwide Series ====
NASCAR Nationwide Series results
Year	Team	No.	Make	1	2	3	4	5	6	7	8	9	10	11	12	13	14	15	16	17	18	19	20	21	22	23	24	25	26	27	28	29	30	31	32	33	34	35	NNSC	Pts	Ref
2009	Rick Ware Racing	31	Chevy	DAY	CAL	LVS	BRI	TEX	NSH	PHO	TAL	RCH	DAR	CLT	DOV	NSH	KEN	MLW	NHA	DAY	CHI	GTY	IRP	IOW	GLN	MCH	BRI	CGV	ATL	RCH	DOV	KAN	CAL	CLT	MEM; DNQ	TEX	PHO	HOM	N/A	0	

==== Busch East Series ====
NASCAR Busch East Series results
Year	Team	No.	Make	1	2	3	4	5	6	7	8	9	10	11	NBESC	Pts	Ref
2006	MacDonald Motorsports	72	Chevy	GRE	STA	HOL	TMP	ERI	NHA; 20	ADI	WFD	NHA	DOV	LRP	53rd	103	

=== ARCA Menards Series ===
(key) (Bold – Pole position awarded by qualifying time. Italics – Pole position earned by points standings or practice time. * – Most laps led.)

ARCA Menards Series results
Year	Team	No.	Make	1	2	3	4	5	6	7	8	9	10	11	12	13	14	15	16	17	18	19	20	AMSC	Pts	Ref
2022	Performance P-1 Motorsports	77	Toyota	DAY	PHO; Wth	TAL	KAN	CLT	IOW	BLN	ELK	MOH	POC	IRP	MCH	GLN	ISF	MLW	DSF	KAN	BRI	SLM	TOL	N/A	0	
2024	Jan's Towing Racing	71	Ford	DAY	PHO; 26	TAL	DOV	KAN	CLT	IOW	MOH	BLN	IRP	SLM	ELK	MCH	ISF	MLW	DSF	GLN	BRI	KAN	TOL	107th	18	

==== ARCA Menards Series West ====
ARCA Menards Series West results
Year	Team	No.	Make	1	2	3	4	5	6	7	8	9	10	11	12	13	14	AMSW	Pts	Ref
2004	Puskarich Racing	4	Chevy	PHO	MMR	CAL; 29	S99	EVG	IRW	S99	RMR	DCS	PHO; 16			IRW; 24		23rd	523	
2004	Puskarich Racing	4	Pontiac											CNS; 9	MMR; 20			23rd	523	
2005	Puskarich Racing	4	Pontiac	PHO	MMR	PHO	S99	IRW	EVG	S99	PPR	CAL	DCS	CTS; 13	MMR; 23			34th	218	
2018	Performance P-1 Motorsports	77	Toyota	KCR	TUS	TUS	OSS; 9	CNS	SON	DCS	IOW	EVG; 11	GTW	LVS	MER	AAS; 4	KCR; 13	19th	139	
2019	DeLong Racing Inc.	64	Toyota	LVS	IRW; 17	TUS	TUS	CNS	SON	DCS	IOW	EVG	GTW	MER	AAS	KCR	PHO	57th	27	
2021	Performance P-1 Motorsports	77	Toyota	PHO	SON	IRW; 9	CNS	IRW	PIR	LVS	AAS	PHO						49th	35	
2022	Performance P-1 Motorsports	77	Toyota	PHO; Wth	IRW; 11			SON; 22	IRW; 17	EVG	PIR	AAS; 10	LVS; 15	PHO				18th	178	
2022	Lowden Motorsports	11	Chevy			KCR; 11	PIR											18th	178	
2023	Performance P-1 Motorsports	77	Toyota	PHO	IRW; 16	KCR; 10	PIR	SON; 14	IRW; 8									13th	327	
2023	Performance P-1 Motorsports	77	Ford							SHA; 8	EVG; Wth							13th	327	
2023	Joanides Motorsports	71	Ford									AAS; 11	LVS; 17	MAD; 8	PHO; 27			13th	327	
2024	Jan's Towing Racing	71	Ford	PHO; 26	KER; 5	PIR; 14	SON; 19	IRW; 7	**IRW**; 4	SHA; 8	TRI; 10	MAD	AAS	KER	PHO			10th	310	
2025	Performance P-1 Motorsports	77	Toyota	KER	PHO	TUC	CNS	KER	SON; 26	TRI	PIR	AAS	MAD; 14	LVS; 17	PHO			29th	75	
