= Monty Tipton =

American racing driver (born 2007)

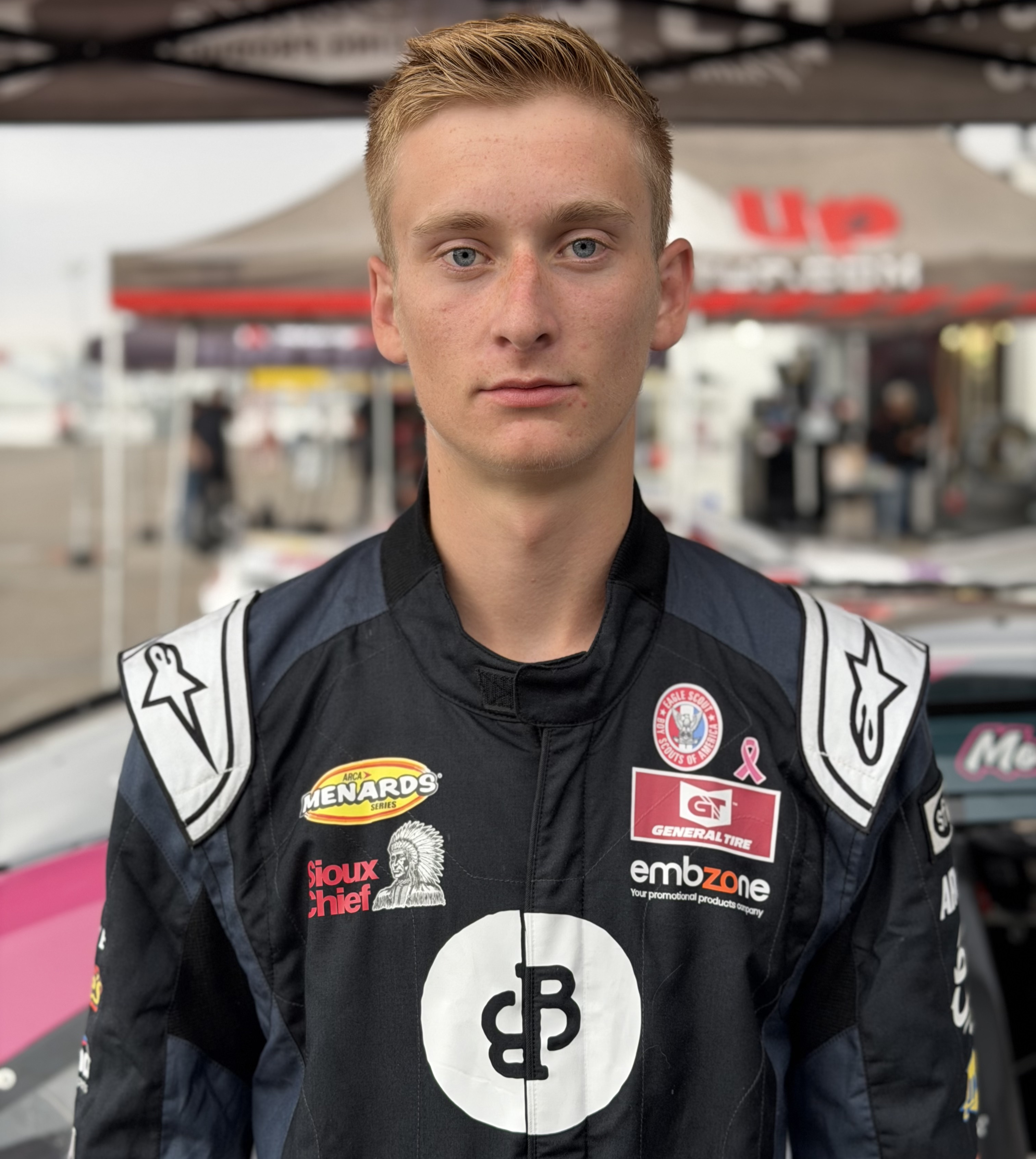
- Tipton at Las Vegas Motor Speedway in 2025
- Born: January 18, 2007 (age 19); Mill Valley, California, U.S.

NASCAR FedEx Freight Truck Series career
- 3 races run over 1 year
- 2026 position: 77th
- Best finish: 77th (2026)
- First race: 2026 TSport 200 (IRP)
- Last race: 2026 Black's Tire 200 (Martinsville)
Wins	Top tens	Poles
0	0	0

ARCA Menards Series career
- 3 races run over 1 year
- Best finish: 59th (2026)
- First race: 2026 General Tire 150 (Phoenix)
- Last race: 2026 Alabama Manufactured Housing 200 (Talladega)
Wins	Top tens	Poles
0	1	0

ARCA Menards Series West career
- 6 races run over 3 years
- Best finish: 15th (2025)
- First race: 2023 Star Nursery 150 (Las Vegas Bullring)
- Last race: 2026 General Tire 150 (Phoenix)
Wins	Top tens	Poles
0	0	0
- Statistics up to date as of November 6, 2026.

Monty Tipton (born January 18, 2007) is an American professional stock car racing driver. He last competed part-time in the NASCAR Craftsman Truck Series, driving the No. 2/22 Ford F-150 for Team Reaume, part-time in the ARCA Menards Series, driving the No. 17 for Cook Racing Technologies, and part-time in the ARCA Menards Series West, driving the No. 4 Toyota for Nascimento Motorsports.

== Racing career ==
Tipton first started his racing career competing in go-karts at the age of ten before progressing up to the junior late model program at Madera Speedway at the age of fourteen.

Tipton has raced various late model events at the Las Vegas Motor Speedway Bullring, having first competed at the track in 2022. In 2023, he finished third in the NASCAR Advance Auto Parts Weekly Series standings in Nevada with thirteen top-tens in fifteenth starts.

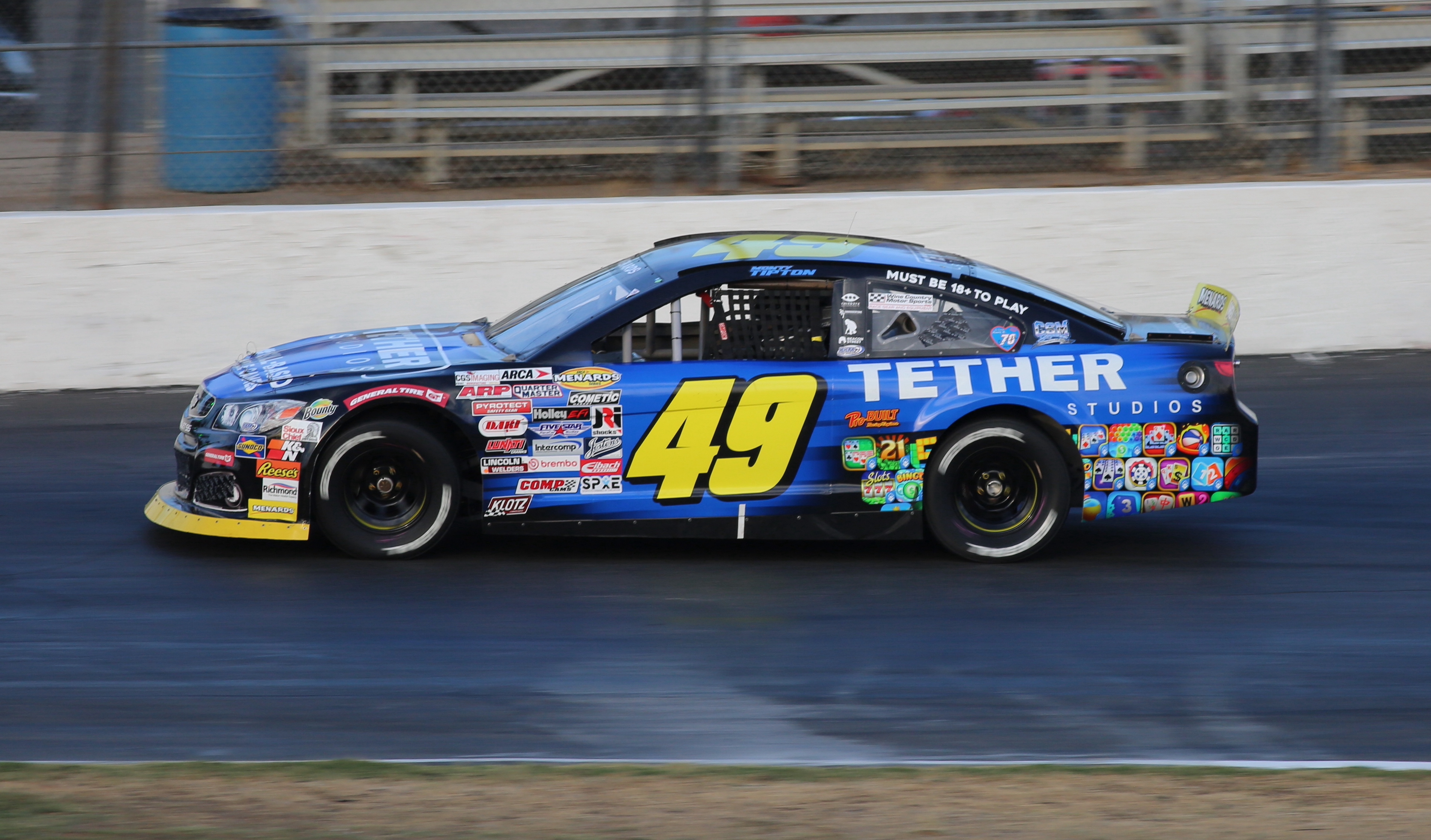
Tipton's No. 49 ARCA car at Madera Speedway in 2023

In 2023, it was revealed that Tipton would make his debut in the ARCA Menards Series West at the Bullring, driving the No. 49 Chevrolet for 3K Motorsports. After placing tenth in the only practice session, he qualified in seventeenth and finished in eighteenth due to transmission issues. Tipton returned with the team in the following race at Madera Speedway, where he practiced and qualified in seventeenth and finished in twelfth due to a crash with a handful of laps remaining.

In 2026, it was revealed that Tipton would participate in the pre-season test for the ARCA Menards Series at Daytona International Speedway, driving the No. 99 Chevrolet for Maples Motorsports, where he set the 59th quickest time between the two sessions held. He then made his main ARCA debut at Phoenix Raceway, driving the No. 4 Toyota for Nascimento Motorsports.

On March 16, it was announced that Tipton would drive the No. 17 for Cook Racing Technologies at Kansas Speedway and Talladega Superspeedway. In July, it was revealed that he will attempt to make his debut in the NASCAR Craftsman Truck Series at Lucas Oil Indianapolis Raceway Park, driving the No. 22 Ford for Team Reaume.

== Personal life ==
Outside of racing, Tipton is a participating Eagle Scout in the Boy Scouts of America.

== Motorsports career results ==
=== Stock car career summary ===
Season	Series	Team	Races	Wins	Top 5	Top 10	Points	Position
2023	ARCA Menards Series West	3K Motorsports	2	0	0	0	58	32nd
2025	ARCA Menards Series West	Nascimento Motorsports	3	0	0	0	139	15th
2026	ARCA Menards Series West	Nascimento Motorsports	1	0	0	0	32	62nd
2026	ARCA Menards Series	Nascimento Motorsports	1	0	0	0	74	59th
2026	ARCA Menards Series	Cook Racing Technologies	2	0	0	1	74	59th
2026	NASCAR Craftsman Truck Series	Team Reaume	3	0	0	0	14	77th

=== NASCAR ===
(key) (Bold – Pole position awarded by qualifying time. Italics – Pole position earned by points standings or practice time. * – Most laps led.)

==== Craftsman Truck Series ====
NASCAR Craftsman Truck Series results
Year	Team	No.	Make	1	2	3	4	5	6	7	8	9	10	11	12	13	14	15	16	17	18	19	20	21	22	23	24	25	NCTC	Pts	Ref
2026	Team Reaume	22	Ford	DAY	ATL	STP	DAR	CAR	BRI	TEX	GLN	DOV	CLT	NSH	MCH	COR	LRP	NWS	IRP; 30	RCH	NHA	BRI	KAN	CLT					77th	14	
2026	Team Reaume	2	Ford																						PHO; 32	TAL	MAR; 35	HOM	77th	14	

=== ARCA Menards Series ===
(key) (Bold – Pole position awarded by qualifying time. Italics – Pole position earned by points standings or practice time. * – Most laps led. ** – All laps led.)

ARCA Menards Series results
Year	Team	No.	Make	1	2	3	4	5	6	7	8	9	10	11	12	13	14	15	16	17	18	19	20	AMSC	Pts	Ref
2026	Nascimento Motorsports	4	Toyota	DAY	PHO; 12																			59th	74	
2026	Cook Racing Technologies	17	Toyota			KAN; 8																		59th	74	
2026	Cook Racing Technologies	17	Chevy				TAL; 38	GLN	TOL	MCH	POC	BER	ELK	CHI	LRP	IRP	IOW	ISF	MAD	DSF	SLM	BRI	KAN	59th	74	

==== ARCA Menards Series West ====
ARCA Menards Series West results
Year	Team	No.	Make	1	2	3	4	5	6	7	8	9	10	11	12	13	AMSWC	Pts	Ref
2023	3K Motorsports	49	Chevy	PHO	IRW	KCR	PIR	SON	IRW	SHA	EVG	AAS	LVS; 18	MAD; 12	PHO		32nd	58	
2025	Nascimento Motorsports	21	Toyota	KER	PHO	TUC	CNS	KER	SON	TRI	PIR	AAS	MAD; 15				15th	139	
2025	Nascimento Motorsports	4	Chevy											LVS; 11			15th	139	
2025	Nascimento Motorsports	4	Toyota												PHO; 17		15th	139	
2026	Nascimento Motorsports	4	Toyota	KER	PHO; 12	TUC	SHA	CNS	TRI	SON	PIR	AAS	MAD	LVS	PHO	KER	62nd	32	
