= Shane Backes =

American racing driver (born 1976)

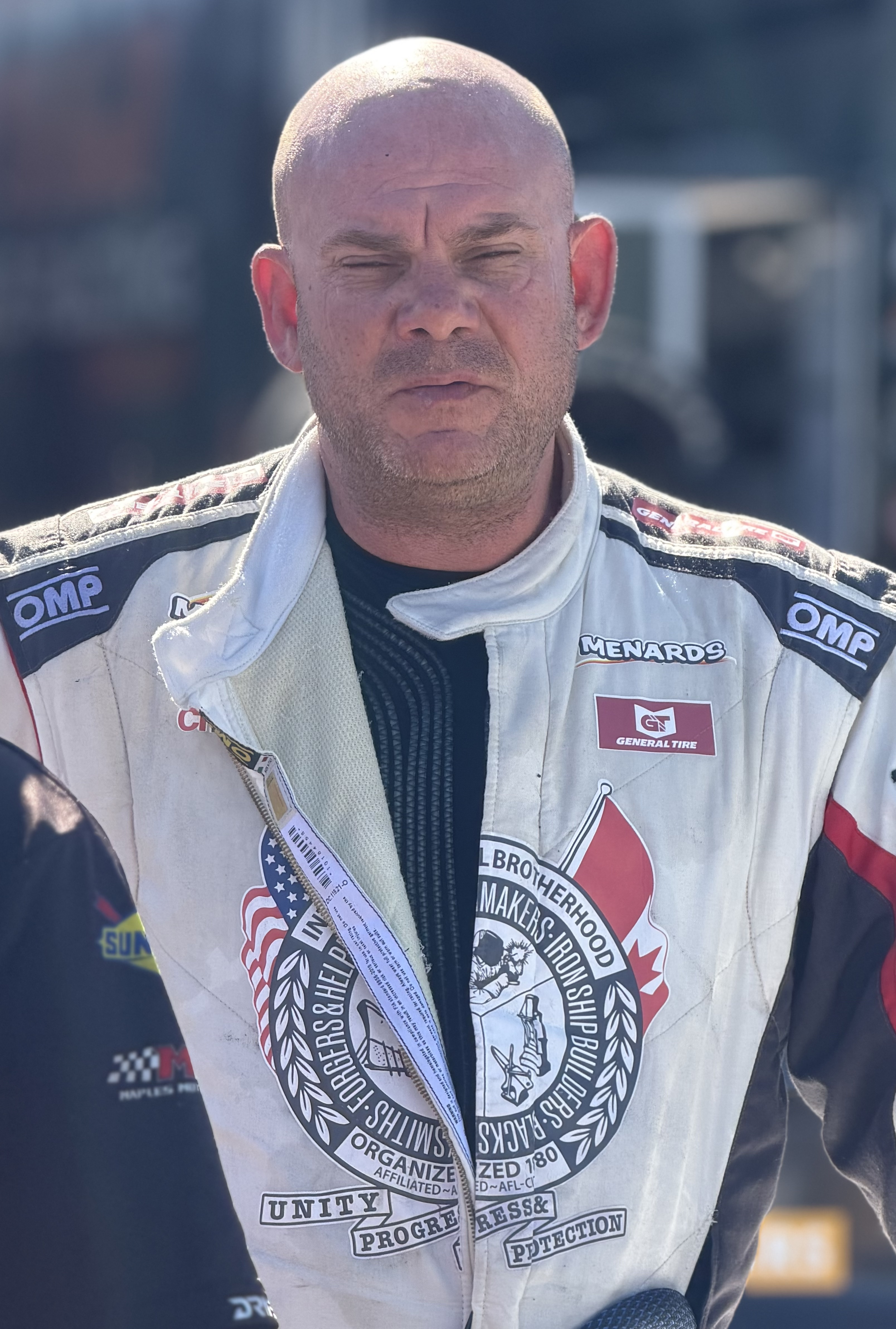
- Backes at Phoenix Raceway in 2025
- Born: April 19, 1976 (age 50); Evans, Georgia, U.S.

ARCA Menards Series career
- 3 races run over 1 year
- Best finish: 68th (2025)
- First race: 2025 General Tire 100 at The Glen (Watkins Glen)
- Last race: 2025 Owens Corning 200 (Toledo)
Wins	Top tens	Poles
0	0	0

ARCA Menards Series West career
- 2 races run over 1 year
- Best finish: 22nd (2025)
- First race: 2025 Star Nursery 150 (Las Vegas Bullring)
- Last race: 2025 Desert Diamond Casino West Valley 100 (Phoenix)
Wins	Top tens	Poles
0	0	0
- Statistics up to date as of November 2, 2025.

Shane Backes (born April 19, 1976) is an American professional stock car racing driver. He last competed part-time in the ARCA Menards Series and ARCA Menards Series West, driving the No. 67 Chevrolet for Maples Motorsports.

== Racing career ==
Backes first began racing at the age of eleven, and has previously competed in the International Hot Rod Association.

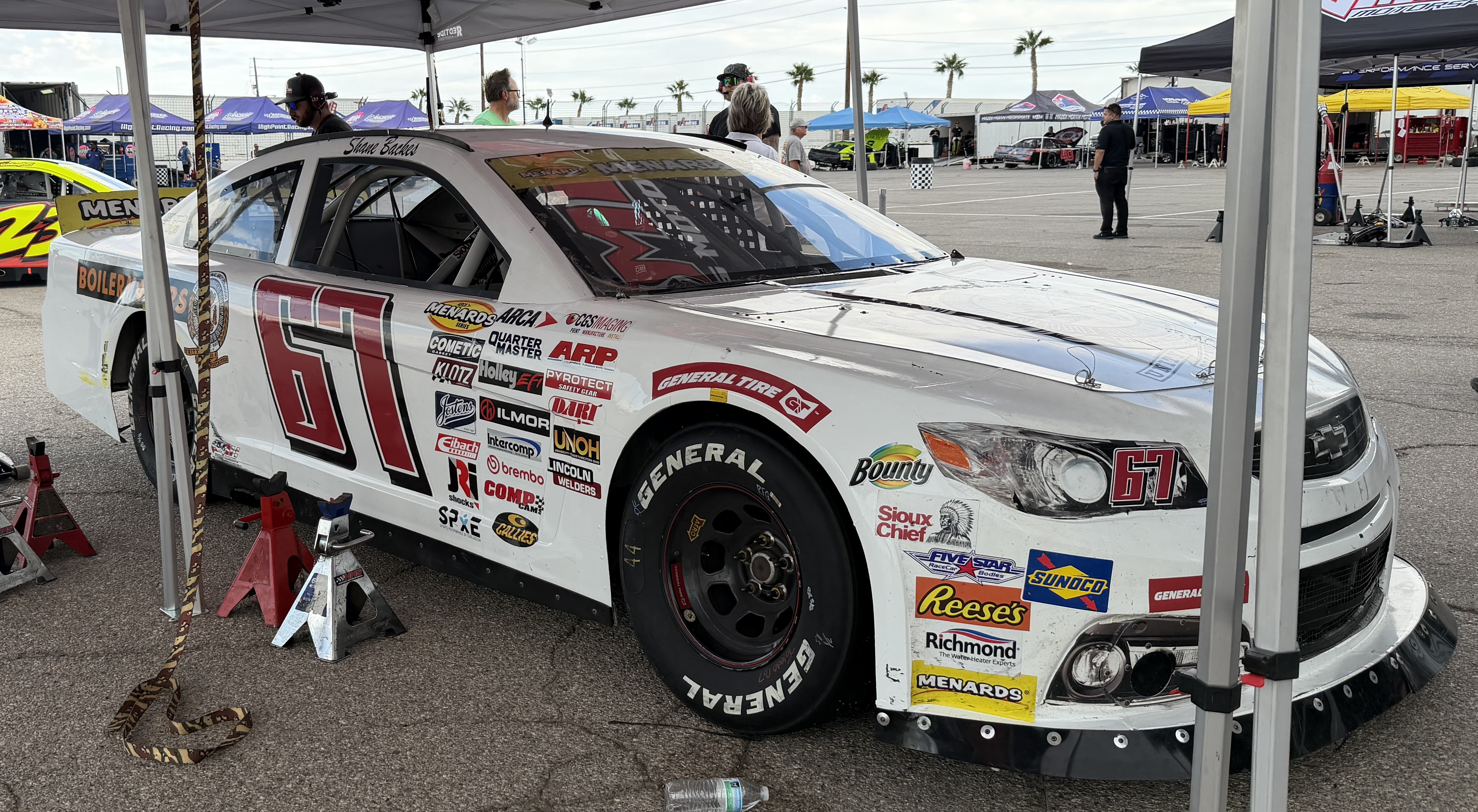
Backes' No. 67 ARCA car at the Las Vegas Motor Speedway Bullring in 2025

In 2025, it was revealed that Backes would make his debut in the ARCA Menards Series at Watkins Glen International, driving the No. 00 Toyota for VWV Racing. However, the entry was withdrawn a couple days later, and Backes was then tabbed to drive the No. 67 Chevrolet for Maples Motorsports. After placing 25th in the lone practice session, he qualified in 23th and finished in 24th after suffering a crash midway through the race. Later on, he returned with Maples at Madison International Speedway, where after placing nineteenth in practice, he qualified in 21st, and finished in seventeenth despite being involved in an incident with Lawless Alan early in the race. Backes would also run with the team at the season ending race at Toledo Speedway. He made his ARCA Menards Series West debut for the team at the Las Vegas Motor Speedway Bullring.

In 2026, it was revealed that Backes would participate in the pre-season test for the ARCA Menards Series at Daytona International Speedway, driving the No. 1 Chevrolet for Maples, where he set the 75th quickest time between the two sessions held.

== Motorsports results ==
=== Stock car career summary ===
Season	Series	Team	Races	Wins	Top 5	Top 10	Points	Position
2025	ARCA Menards Series West	Maples Motorsports	2	0	0	0	100	22nd
2025	ARCA Menards Series	Maples Motorsports	2	0	0	0	66	68th

=== ARCA Menards Series ===
(key) (Bold – Pole position awarded by qualifying time. Italics – Pole position earned by points standings or practice time. * – Most laps led.)

ARCA Menards Series results
Year	Team	No.	Make	1	2	3	4	5	6	7	8	9	10	11	12	13	14	15	16	17	18	19	20	AMSC	Pts	Ref
2025	VWV Racing	00	Toyota	DAY	PHO	TAL	KAN	CLT	MCH	BLN	ELK	LRP	DOV	IRP	IOW	GLN; Wth								68th	66	
2025	Maples Motorsports	67	Chevy													GLN; 24	ISF	MAD; 17	DSF	BRI	SLM	KAN	TOL; 25	68th	66	

==== ARCA Menards Series West ====
ARCA Menards Series West results
Year	Team	No.	Make	1	2	3	4	5	6	7	8	9	10	11	12	AMSWC	Pts	Ref
2025	Maples Motorsports	67	Chevy	KER	PHO	TUC	CNS	KER	SON	TRI	PIR	AAS	MAD	LVS; 14	PHO; 24	22nd	100	
