= 2025 ARCA Menards Series West =

72nd season of the ARCA Menards Series West

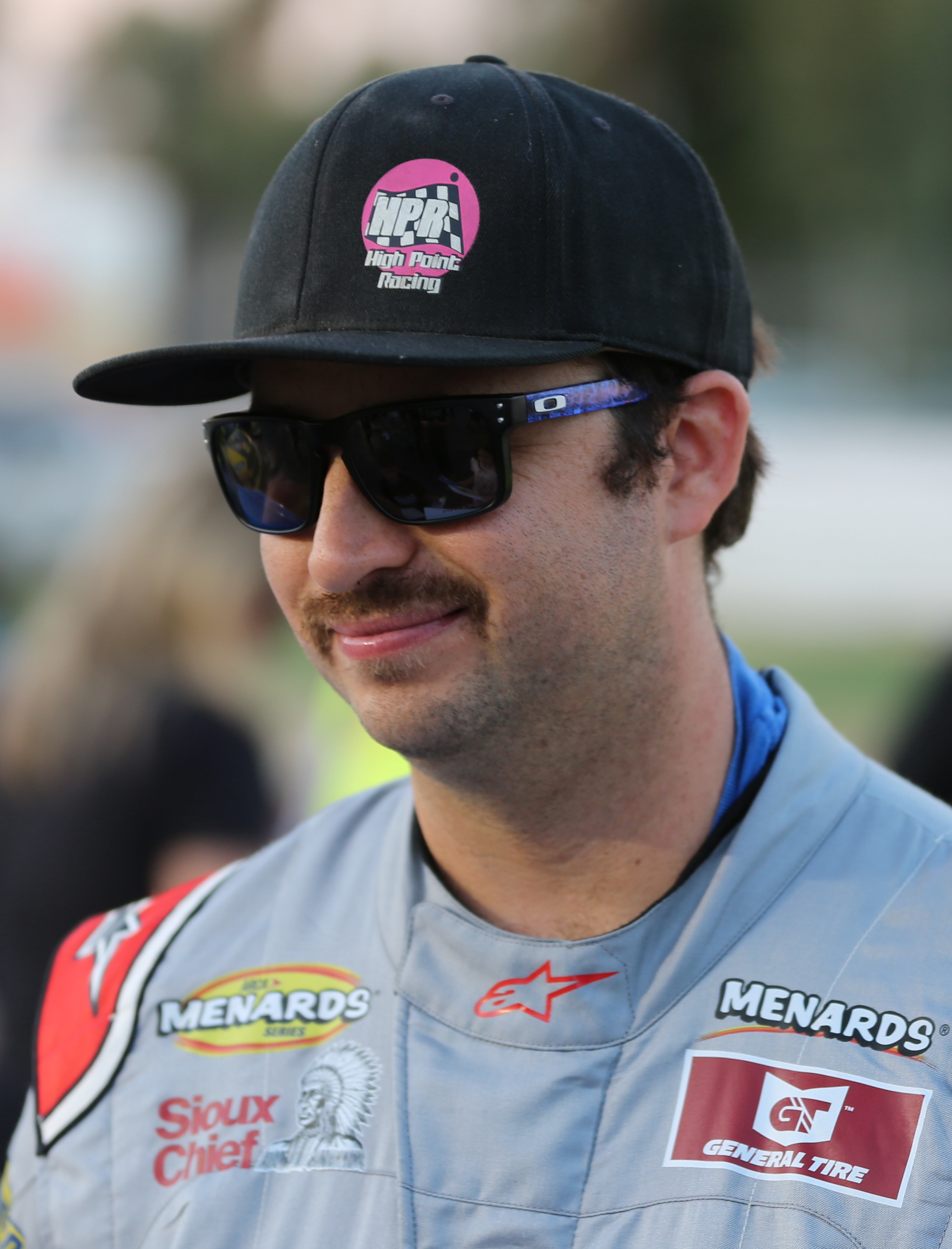
Trevor Huddleston, the 2025 ARCA Menards Series West champion.

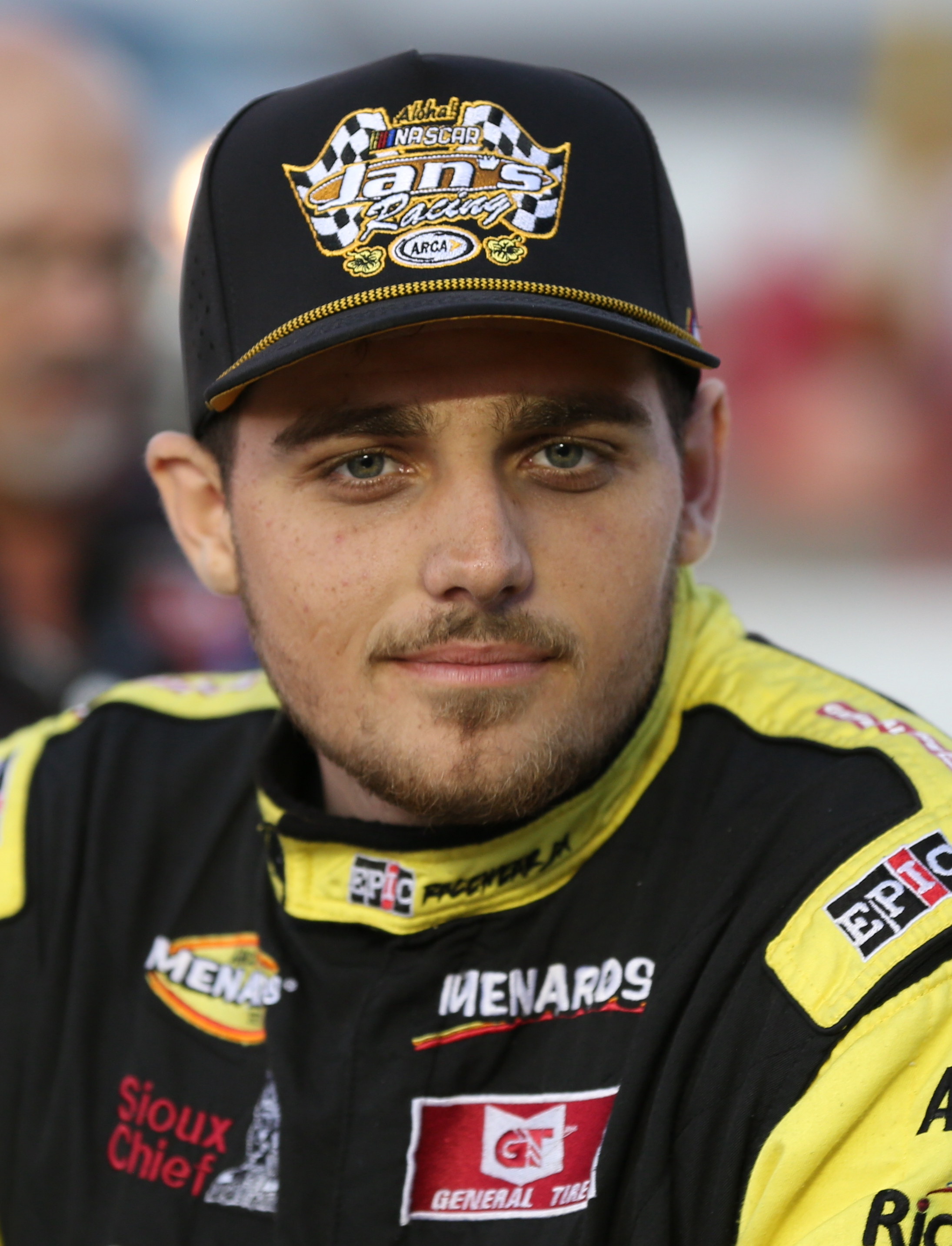
Kyle Keller finished second behind Huddleston in the championship.

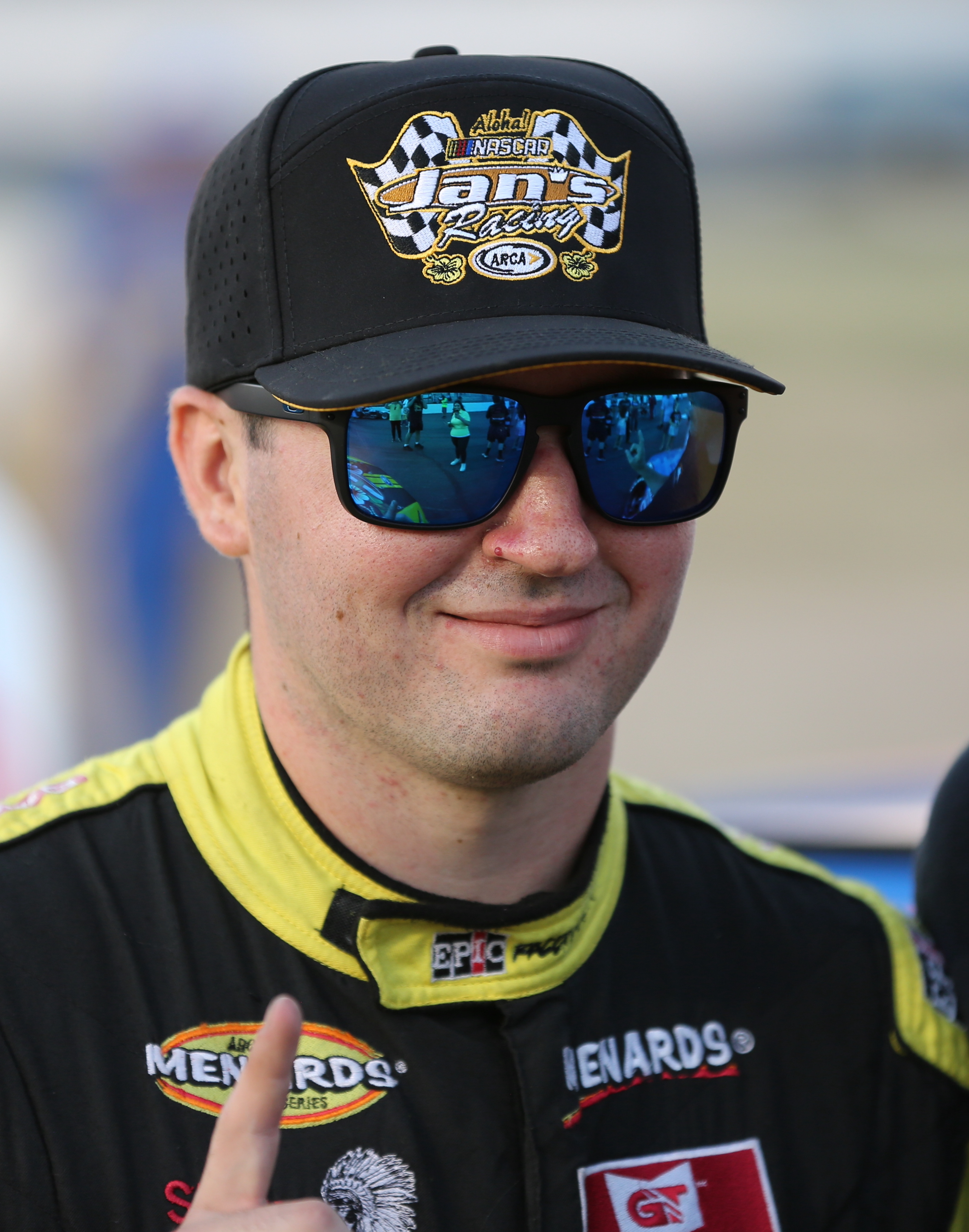
Robbie Kennealy finished third behind Huddleston in the championship.

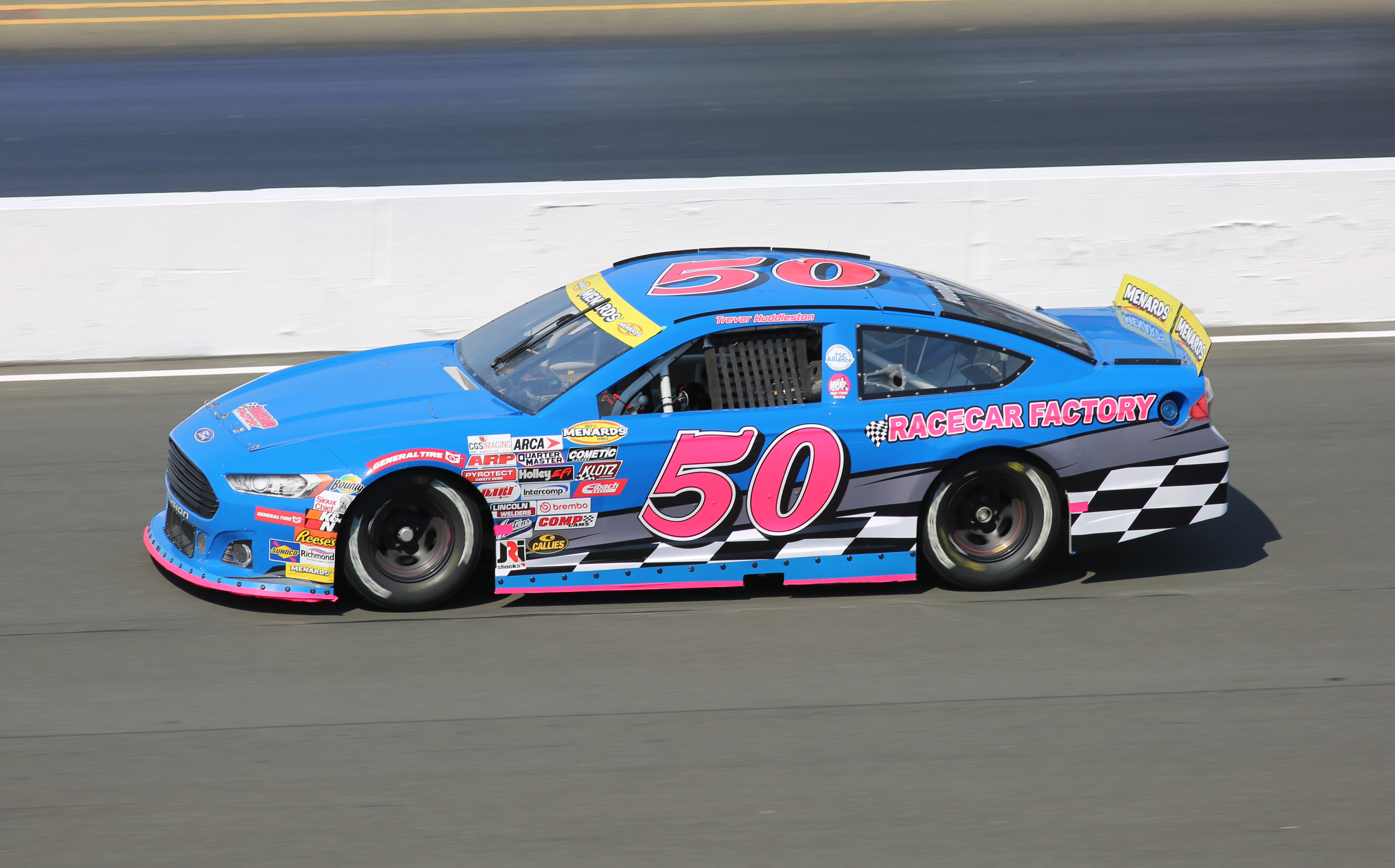
The No. 50 car of High Point Racing won the owners' championship. Ford also won the manufacturers championship.

The 2025 ARCA Menards Series West was the 72nd season of the ARCA Menards Series West, a regional stock car racing series sanctioned by NASCAR in the United States. The season began on January 25 at Kevin Harvick's Kern Raceway with the West Coast Stock Car Motorsports Hall of Fame 150 and concluded with the Desert Diamond Casino West Valley 100 at Phoenix Raceway, on November 1.

2023 and 2024 champion Sean Hingorani did not pursue a third consecutive title and did not compete in the series full-time in 2025. At the conclusion of the season finale at Phoenix, Trevor Huddleston of family-owned team High Point Racing became the ARCA West champion.

== Teams and drivers ==
=== Complete schedule ===
Manufacturer	Team	No.	Driver	Crew chief	Ref
Chevrolet	Strike Mamba Racing	51	Blake Lothian (R)	John Reaume	
Chevrolet	Strike Mamba Racing	72	Cody Dennison 5	Al Lebert	
Chevrolet	Strike Mamba Racing	72	Jonathan Reaume 5	Al Lebert	
Chevrolet	Strike Mamba Racing	72	Holly Clark 1	Al Lebert	
Chevrolet	Strike Mamba Racing	72	Austin Varco 1	Al Lebert	
Ford	High Point Racing	50	Trevor Huddleston	Jeff Schrader	
Ford	Jan's Towing Racing with Kennealy Keller Motorsports	1	Robbie Kennealy (R)	Chris Greaney	
Ford	Jan's Towing Racing with Kennealy Keller Motorsports	71	Kyle Keller	Brian Kizer	
Toyota	Jerry Pitts Racing	5	Eric Johnson Jr.	Dustin Ash	
Toyota	Shockwave Motorsports	05	David Smith	Brandon Carlson	
Toyota 9 Ford 3	Central Coast Racing	13	Tanner Reif 11	Michael Muñoz	
Toyota 9 Ford 3	Central Coast Racing	13	Jade Avedisian 1	Michael Muñoz	

=== Limited schedule ===
Manufacturer	Team	No.	Driver	Crew chief	Races	Ref
Chevrolet	1/4 Ley Racing	8	Jeff Anton	David Reese	1	
Chevrolet	1/4 Ley Racing	32	Dale Quarterley	Alex Quarterley	2	
Chevrolet	Bill McAnally Racing	16	Jack Wood	Kevin Bellicourt	1	
Chevrolet	Bill McAnally Racing	19	Daniel Hemric	Joshua Graham 1 Cayden Lapcevich 9	1	
Chevrolet	Bill McAnally Racing	19	Jake Bollman (R)	Joshua Graham 1 Cayden Lapcevich 9	8	
Chevrolet	Bill McAnally Racing	19	Christian Eckes	Joshua Graham 1 Cayden Lapcevich 9	2	
Chevrolet	Cook Racing Technologies	17	Kaylee Bryson	Sean Samuels	2	
Chevrolet	Cook Racing Technologies	42	Spencer Davis	Sean Samuels	1	
Chevrolet	CR7 Motorsports	97	Jason Kitzmiller	Frank Kimmel	1	
Chevrolet	Davey Magras Racing	14	Davey Magras	Zach Magras	2	
Chevrolet	Fierce Creature Racing	27	Bobby Hillis Jr.	Tony Huffman	1	
Chevrolet	Maples Motorsports	67	Ryan Vargas	Kyle Totman	1	
Chevrolet	Maples Motorsports	67	Shane Backes	Kyle Totman	2	
Chevrolet	Maples Motorsports	99	Michael Maples	Jeremy Petty	3	
Chevrolet	Pinnacle Racing Group	28	Brenden Queen	Steven Dawson	1	
Chevrolet	Pinnacle Racing Group	28	Carson Brown	Steven Dawson	1	
Chevrolet	Rev Racing	6	Lavar Scott	Glenn Parker	1	
Chevrolet	Rodd Racing	68	P. J. Pedroncelli	Ty Joiner 1 Tony Caputo 1	1	
Chevrolet	Rodd Racing	68	Rodd Kneeland	Ty Joiner 1 Tony Caputo 1	1	
Chevrolet	Sigma Performance Services	23	Greg Biffle	Tom Ackerman 2 Billy Wheeler 2	1	
Chevrolet	Sigma Performance Services	23	Tyler Reif	Tom Ackerman 2 Billy Wheeler 2	1	
Chevrolet	Sigma Performance Services	24	Tyler Reif	Tom Ackerman 2 Billy Wheeler 2	1	
Chevrolet	Sigma Performance Services	24	Greg Biffle	Tom Ackerman 2 Billy Wheeler 2	1	
Chevrolet	Sigma Performance Services	24	Connor Hall	Tom Ackerman 2 Billy Wheeler 2	2	
Chevrolet	Spire Motorsports	77	Corey Day	Mark McFarland 1 Shane Huffman 2	1	
Chevrolet	Spire Motorsports	7	Corey Day	Mark McFarland 1 Shane Huffman 2	1	
Chevrolet	Spire Motorsports	77	Tristan McKee	Mark McFarland 1 Shane Huffman 2	1	
Ford	AM Racing	76	Kole Raz	Ryan London	1	
Ford	Brad Smith Motorsports	48	Brad Smith	Gary Sevenans	1	
Ford	Clubb Racing Inc.	03	Alex Clubb	Brian Clubb	1	
Ford	Clubb Racing Inc.	86	Alex Malycke	Robert Clubb	1	
Ford	Fast Track Racing	10	Brad Perez	Joseth Carabantes	1	
Ford	High Point Racing	55	Andrew Chapman	Travis Thirkettle	5	
Ford	Jan's Towing Racing with Kennealy Keller Motorsports	9	Joey Kennealy	Harley Kennealy 1 Keith Swanson 1	1	
Ford	Jan's Towing Racing with Kennealy Keller Motorsports	9	R. J. Smotherman	Harley Kennealy 1 Keith Swanson 1	1	
Ford	Naake-Klauer Motorsports	88	Will Rodgers	Mike Naake	1	
Ford	Naake-Klauer Motorsports	88	Joey Iest	Mike Naake	2	
Toyota	Central Coast Racing	3	Adrián Ferrer (R)	Gilbert Muñoz	2	
Toyota	Central Coast Racing	3	Todd Souza	Gilbert Muñoz	7	
Toyota	Central Coast Racing	3	Fernando Navarrete	Gilbert Muñoz	1	
Toyota	Fast Track Racing	9	Tony Cosentino	Chris Vanscoy	1	
Toyota	Fast Track Racing	11	Cody Dennison	Mike Sroufe 1 Chris Vanscoy 1	1	
Toyota	Fast Track Racing	11	Bryce Haugeberg	Mike Sroufe 1 Chris Vanscoy 1	1	
Toyota	Joe Gibbs Racing	18	Brent Crews	Matt Ross	2	
Toyota	Joe Gibbs Racing	18	William Sawalich	Matt Ross	2	
Toyota	KLAS Motorsports	73	Andy Jankowiak	Mike Dayton	1	
Toyota	Nascimento Motorsports	21	Monty Tipton	Eric Nascimento Sr.	1	
Toyota	Nitro Motorsports	20	Leland Honeyman	Glenn Parker	1	
Toyota	Nitro Motorsports	25	Taylor Reimer	Danny Johnson	1	
Toyota	Nitro Motorsports	46	Thad Moffitt	Shannon Rursch 1 Larry Balsitis 1	2	
Toyota	Nitro Motorsports	70	Thomas Annunziata	Shannon Rursch	2	
Toyota	Performance P–1 Motorsports	77	Mariah Boudrieau	Joe Nava 1 Tony Jackson 3 Dave McKenzie 1	2	
Toyota	Performance P–1 Motorsports	77	Nick Joanides	Joe Nava 1 Tony Jackson 3 Dave McKenzie 1	3	
Toyota	Philpott Race Cars	52	Ryan Philpott	Chuck Dozhier	1	
Toyota	Phoenix Racing	15	Jake Finch	Johnny Allen	1	
Toyota	RAFA Racing Team	2	Isabella Robusto	Jamie Jones	1	
Toyota	Rise Motorsports	31	Tim Viens	Tim Goulet 2 Matthew Wright 2	1	
Toyota	Rise Motorsports	31	Tim Goulet	Tim Goulet 2 Matthew Wright 2	1	
Toyota	Rise Motorsports	31	Tyler Brown	Tim Goulet 2 Matthew Wright 2	1	
Toyota	Rise Motorsports	31	Chase Howard	Tim Goulet 2 Matthew Wright 2	1	
Toyota	Shockwave Motorsports	09	Derek Kraus	Darrel Crocker	1	
Toyota	Venturini Motorsports	15	Treyten Lapcevich	Ron Otto 1 Shannon Rursch 1	1	
Toyota	Venturini Motorsports	15	Thomas Annunziata (Note: Entry was fielded in collaboration with Nitro Motorsports)	Ron Otto 1 Shannon Rursch 1	1	
Toyota	Venturini Motorsports	20	Lawless Alan	Kevin Reed Jr.	1	
Toyota	Venturini Motorsports	20	Jade Avedisian	Kevin Reed Jr.	1	
Toyota	Venturini Motorsports	25	Patrick Staropoli	Jamie Jones 2 Kevin Reed Jr. 1 Danny Johnson 1	1	
Toyota	Venturini Motorsports	25	Alon Day	Jamie Jones 2 Kevin Reed Jr. 1 Danny Johnson 1	2	
Toyota	Venturini Motorsports	25	Taylor Reimer	Jamie Jones 2 Kevin Reed Jr. 1 Danny Johnson 1	1	
Toyota	Venturini Motorsports	55	Isabella Robusto	Larry Balsitis	1	
Toyota	Wayne Peterson Racing	06	Brayton Laster	Nate Moeller	1	
Toyota 4 Chevrolet 1	Clark Racing	23	Eric Rhead	Chris Bray	1	
Toyota 4 Chevrolet 1	Clark Racing	23	Jaron Giannini	Chris Bray	2	
Toyota 4 Chevrolet 1	Clark Racing	23	Spencer Gallagher	Chris Bray	2	
Ford 1 Toyota 1	Fast Track Racing	12	Tim Monroe	Dick Doheny 1 Andrew Kierman 1	1	
Ford 1 Toyota 1	Fast Track Racing	12	Dustin Hillenburg	Dick Doheny 1 Andrew Kierman 1	1	
Toyota 5 Ford 2	Jerry Pitts Racing	6	Gavin Ray	Jerry Pitts 2 R. J. Johnson 4	3	
Toyota 5 Ford 2	Jerry Pitts Racing	6	Caleb Shrader	Jerry Pitts 2 R. J. Johnson 4	3	
Toyota 5 Ford 2	Jerry Pitts Racing	6	Buddy Shepherd	Jerry Pitts 2 R. J. Johnson 4	1	
Toyota 2 Chevrolet 3	Nascimento Motorsports	4	Eric Nascimento	Ty Joiner	3	
Toyota 2 Chevrolet 3	Nascimento Motorsports	4	Monty Tipton	Ty Joiner	2	

== Schedule ==
The full schedule was announced on December 6, 2024. Some race dates were announced before then as part of the announcement of the main ARCA Series schedule on September 27.

Notes:

- The race at Phoenix in March is a combination race with the ARCA Menards Series (highlighted in gold).

No	Race title	Track	Location	Date
1	West Coast Stock Car Motorsports Hall of Fame 150	Kevin Harvick's Kern Raceway	Bakersfield, California	January 25
2	General Tire 150	Phoenix Raceway	Avondale, Arizona	March 7
3	ARCA Menards Series West 150 presented by the West Coast Stock Car Motorsports Hall of Fame	Tucson Speedway	Tucson, Arizona	April 5
4	Colorado 150	Colorado National Speedway	Dacono, Colorado	May 24
5	NAPA Auto Parts 150 presented by the West Coast Stock Car Motorsports Hall of Fame	Kevin Harvick's Kern Raceway	Bakersfield, California	June 14
6	General Tire 200	Sonoma Raceway	Sonoma, California	July 11
7	NAPA Auto Care 150	Tri-City Raceway	West Richland, Washington	August 9
8	Portland 112	Portland International Raceway	Portland, Oregon	August 29
9	NAPA Auto Parts 150	All American Speedway	Roseville, California	September 13
10	Madera 150 presented by Madera Ford and the West Coast Stock Car Motorsports Hall of Fame	Madera Speedway	Madera, California	September 27
11	Star Nursery 150 presented by the West Coast Stock Car Motorsports Hall of Fame	Las Vegas Motor Speedway Bullring	Las Vegas, Nevada	October 10
12	Desert Diamond Casino West Valley 100	Phoenix Raceway	Avondale, Arizona	November 1

== Results and standings ==
=== Race results ===
No.	Race	Pole position	Most laps led	Winning driver	Manufacturer	No.	Winning team	Report
1	West Coast Stock Car Motorsports Hall of Fame 150	Daniel Hemric	Trevor Huddleston	Trevor Huddleston	Ford	50	High Point Racing	Report
2	General Tire 150	Brent Crews	Brenden Queen	Brent Crews	Toyota	18	Joe Gibbs Racing	Report
3	ARCA Menards Series West 150 presented by the West Coast Stock Car Motorsports Hall of Fame	Jake Bollman	Todd Souza	Tanner Reif	Toyota	13	Central Coast Racing	Report
4	Colorado 150	Jake Bollman	Jake Bollman	Jake Bollman	Chevrolet	19	Bill McAnally Racing	Report
5	NAPA Auto Parts 150 presented by the West Coast Stock Car Motorsports Hall of Fame	Kyle Keller	Trevor Huddleston	Trevor Huddleston	Ford	50	High Point Racing	Report
6	General Tire 200	William Sawalich	William Sawalich	William Sawalich	Toyota	18	Joe Gibbs Racing	Report
7	NAPA Auto Care 150	Jake Bollman	Jake Bollman	Kyle Keller	Ford	71	Jan's Towing Racing	Report
8	Portland 112	William Sawalich	William Sawalich	William Sawalich	Toyota	18	Joe Gibbs Racing	Report
9	NAPA Auto Parts 150	Robbie Kennealy	Robbie Kennealy	Robbie Kennealy	Ford	1	Jan's Towing Racing	Report
10	Madera 150 presented by Madera Ford and the West Coast Stock Car Motorsports Hall of Fame	Jaron Giannini	Trevor Huddleston	Trevor Huddleston	Ford	50	High Point Racing	Report
11	Star Nursery 150 presented by the West Coast Stock Car Motorsports Hall of Fame	Trevor Huddleston	Trevor Huddleston	Trevor Huddleston	Ford	50	High Point Racing	Report
12	Desert Diamond Casino West Valley 100	Brent Crews	Brent Crews	Brent Crews	Toyota	18	Joe Gibbs Racing	Report

=== Drivers' championship ===
Notes:

- The pole winner also receives one bonus point, similar to the previous ARCA points system used until 2019 and unlike NASCAR.
- Additionally, after groups of five races of the season, drivers that compete in all five races receive fifty additional points. These points bonuses will be given after the races at Bakersfield in June and Madera.
  - Trevor Huddleston, Tanner Reif, Kyle Keller, Eric Johnson Jr., Robbie Kennealy, Blake Lothian, and David Smith received this points bonus for having competed in the first five races of the season (Kern in January, Phoenix in March, Tucson, Colorado, and Kern in June). Huddleston, Keller, Reif, Kennealy, Johnson, Lothian, and Smith received this points bonus for having competed in the next five races of the season (Sonoma, Tri-City, Portland, Roseville, and Madera). Huddleston, Keller, Kennealy, Johnson, Lothian, Smith, Andrew Chapman, Cody Dennison, Thomas Annunziata, Gavin Ray, Monty Tipton, Connor Hall, Taylor Reimer, Michael Maples, Jade Avedisian, and Shane Backes all received this points bonus after competing in the final two races of the season (Las Vegas and Phoenix in November).

(key) Bold – Pole position awarded by time. Italics – Pole position set by final practice results or rainout. * – Most laps led. ** – All laps led.

Pos	Driver	KER	PHO	TUC	CNS	KER	SON	TRI	PIR	AAS	MAD	LVS	PHO	Points
1	Trevor Huddleston	1*	12	5	3	1*	4	5	5	2	1**	1*	10	650
2	Kyle Keller	2	15	4	2	**2**	8	1	6	6	2	13	15	610
3	Robbie Kennealy **(R)**	4	9	7	6	3	21	4	12	**1****	4	3	6	604
4	Eric Johnson Jr.	5	11	2	4	5	17	7	9	5	3	10	20	581
5	Blake Lothian **(R)**	11	17	9	8	9	19	10	17	10	9	8	16	535
6	Tanner Reif	3	13	1	5	4	9	6	10	8	8	5		518
7	David Smith	10	29	12	11	11	20	11	15	12	12	15	25	495
8	Jake Bollman **(R)**		24	**3**	**1****	12		**2***		7	16			255
9	Todd Souza			8*	7	13	23	8		11	11			229
10	Andrew Chapman					6				3	7	6	21	227
11	Cody Dennison	8	16	10							13	20	22	225
12	Thomas Annunziata								2			4	3	174
13	Gavin Ray	6										7	13	156
14	Jonathan Reaume		25			8	16	12		14				145
15	Monty Tipton										15	11	17	139
16	Connor Hall											2	7	130
17	Taylor Reimer											9	12	117
18	Michael Maples		21									21	26	113
19	Eric Nascimento						6			9	10			107
20	Caleb Shrader			6			11		8					107
21	Jade Avedisian											12	19	107
22	Shane Backes											14	24	100
23	William Sawalich						**1****		**1***					98
24	Brent Crews		1										**1****	96
25	Greg Biffle							3	4					82
26	Alon Day						3		3					82
27	Joey Iest									4	5			79
28	Jaron Giannini					7					**6**			76
29	Nick Joanides						26				14	17		75
30	Thad Moffitt		7										8	73
31	Christian Eckes						2		14					72
32	Corey Day		10				7							71
33	Tyler Reif		19				5							65
34	Mariah Boudrieau			11	12									65
35	Adrián Ferrer **(R)**	7	18	Wth										63
36	Davey Magras						15		11					62
37	Dale Quarterley						24		7					57
38	Kaylee Bryson						14						18	56
39	Spencer Gallagher						18					16		54
40	Isabella Robusto		31										11	46
41	Brenden Queen		2*											44
42	Carson Brown												2	42
43	Lawless Alan		4											40
44	Tristan McKee												4	40
45	Lavar Scott		5											39
46	Leland Honeyman												5	39
47	Kole Raz		6											38
48	Patrick Staropoli		8											36
49	Daniel Hemric	**9**												36
50	Treyten Lapcevich		3											35
51	Tyler Brown							9						35
52	Jake Finch												9	35
53	Eric Rhead				9									35
54	Holly Clark				10									34
55	P. J. Pedroncelli					10								34
56	Jeff Anton						10							34
57	Spencer Davis	12												32
58	Ryan Philpott						12							32
59	Tim Goulet			13										31
60	R. J. Smotherman									13				31
61	Jack Wood						13							31
62	Austin Varco								13					31
63	Andy Jankowiak		14											30
64	Joey Kennealy					14				Wth				30
65	Derek Kraus												14	30
66	Buddy Shepherd					15								29
67	Fernando Navarrete								16					28
68	Bobby Hillis Jr.								18					26
69	Dustin Hillenburg											18		26
70	Bryce Haugeberg											19		25
71	Tim Viens		20											24
72	Brayton Laster		22											22
73	Rodd Kneeland						22							22
74	Tim Monroe		23											21
75	Chase Howard												23	21
76	Will Rodgers						25							19
77	Tony Cosentino		26											18
78	Jason Kitzmiller		27											17
79	Alex Clubb		28											16
80	Brad Perez		30											14
81	Ryan Vargas		32											12
82	Brad Smith		33											11
83	Alex Malycke		34											10

== See also ==
- 2025 NASCAR Cup Series
- 2025 NASCAR Xfinity Series
- 2025 NASCAR Craftsman Truck Series
- 2025 ARCA Menards Series
- 2025 ARCA Menards Series East
- 2025 NASCAR Whelen Modified Tour
- 2025 NASCAR Canada Series
- 2025 NASCAR Mexico Series
- 2025 NASCAR Euro Series
- 2025 NASCAR Brasil Series
- 2025 CARS Tour
- 2025 SMART Modified Tour
- 2025 ASA STARS National Tour
