= 2025 Star Nursery 150 =

11th race of the 2025 ARCA Menards Series West

2025 Star Nursery 150 presented by the West Coast Stock Car Motorsports Hall of Fame
Race details
- Race 11 of 12 in the 2025 ARCA Menards Series West season
- Date: October 10, 2025
- Location: The Bullring at Las Vegas Motor Speedway in Las Vegas, Nevada
- Course: Permanent racing facility
- Course length: 0.375 miles (0.604 km)
- Distance: 150 laps, 56.25 mi (90.52 km)
- Scheduled distance: 150 laps, 56.25 mi (90.62 km)
- Average speed: 58.190 mph (93.648 km/h)

Pole position
Driver	Trevor Huddleston	High Point Racing
- Grid positions set by competition-based formula

Most laps led
Driver	Trevor Huddleston	High Point Racing
- Laps: 105

Winner
No. 50	Trevor Huddleston	High Point Racing

Television in the United States
- Network: FloRacing
- Announcers: Charles Krall

Radio in the United States
- Radio: ARCA Racing Network

The 2025 Star Nursery 150 presented by the West Coast Stock Car Motorsports Hall of Fame was the 11th stock car race of the 2025 ARCA Menards Series West season, and the 7th iteration of the event. The race was held on Friday, October 10, 2025, at The Bullring at Las Vegas Motor Speedway in Las Vegas, Nevada, a 0.375 mile (0.604 km) permanent oval-shaped short track. The race took the scheduled 150 laps to complete. Trevor Huddleston, driving for High Point Racing, would show another dominating performance, leading a race-high 105 laps from the pole position to earn his ninth career ARCA Menards Series West win, his fourth of the season, and his second consecutive win. To fill out the podium, Connor Hall, driving for Sigma Performance Services, and Robbie Kennealy, driving for Jan's Towing Racing, would finish second and third, respectively.

This was the final race for driver Nick Joanides, who died two months later. His race was curtailed by a nasty wreck on lap 88, and he suffered a broken leg, compounding a "life-threatening sickness" that the driver had been suffering from for more than two years. This was also the final ARCA race for Venturini Motorsports as an organization, as the team announced on April 18 that they would shut down their operations, transferring ownership to Nitro Motorsports on October 15.

== Report ==
=== Background ===
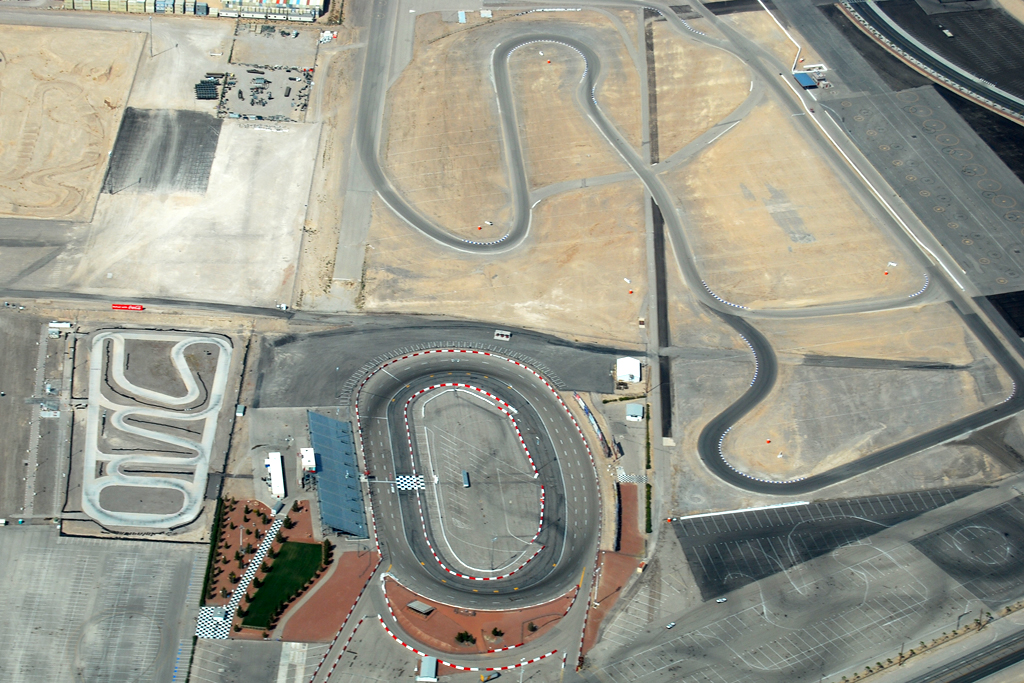
The Bullring at Las Vegas Motor Speedway, the track where the race was held.

Las Vegas Motor Speedway, located in Clark County, Nevada outside the Las Vegas city limits and about 15 miles northeast of the Las Vegas Strip, is a 1,200-acre (490 ha) complex of multiple tracks for motorsports racing. The complex is owned by Speedway Motorsports, Inc., which is headquartered in Charlotte, North Carolina.

In 1985, the complex built a 1/3 mile (0.54 km) oval that was assisted with donations of barriers that were used in the Caesars Palace Grand Prix. In 2000, the track was modified to become 3/8 mile (0.60 km) and was renamed the "Bullring".

==== Entry list ====
- (R) denotes rookie driver.

#	Driver	Team	Make
1	Robbie Kennealy (R)	Jan's Towing Racing	Ford
4	Monty Tipton	Nascimento Motorsports	Toyota
05	David Smith	Shockwave Motorsports	Toyota
5	Eric Johnson Jr.	Jerry Pitts Racing	Toyota
6	Gavin Ray	Jerry Pitts Racing	Toyota
11	Bryce Haugeberg	Fast Track Racing	Ford
12	Dustin Hillenburg	Fast Track Racing	Toyota
13	Tanner Reif	Central Coast Racing	Ford
15	Thomas Annunziata	Venturini Motorsports	Toyota
20	Jade Avedisian	Venturini Motorsports	Toyota
23	Spencer Gallagher	Clark Racing	Toyota
24	Connor Hall	Sigma Performance Services	Chevrolet
25	Taylor Reimer	Venturini Motorsports	Toyota
50	Trevor Huddleston	High Point Racing	Ford
51	Blake Lothian (R)	Strike Mamba Racing	Chevrolet
55	Andrew Chapman	High Point Racing	Ford
67	Shane Backes	Maples Motorsports	Chevrolet
71	Kyle Keller	Jan's Towing Racing	Ford
72	Cody Dennison	Strike Mamba Racing	Chevrolet
77	Nick Joanides	Performance P–1 Motorsports	Toyota
99	Michael Maples	Maples Motorsports	Chevrolet
Official entry list

== Practice ==
The first and only practice session was held on Friday, October 10, at 2:35 PM PST, and would last for 60 minutes. Trevor Huddleston, driving for High Point Racing, would set the fastest time in the session, with a lap of 15.058, and a speed of 89.653 mph (144.283 km/h).

Pos.	#	Driver	Team	Make	Time	Speed
1	50	Trevor Huddleston	High Point Racing	Ford	15.058	89.653
2	1	Robbie Kennealy (R)	Jan's Towing Racing	Ford	15.117	89.303
3	71	Kyle Keller	Jan's Towing Racing	Ford	15.130	89.227
Full practice results

== Starting lineup ==
Qualifying was originally scheduled to be held on Friday, October 10, at 4:05 PM PST, but was cancelled due to inclement weather. The starting lineup would be determined by practice speeds. As a result, Trevor Huddleston, driving for High Point Racing, was awarded the pole.

=== Starting lineup ===
Pos.	#	Driver	Team	Make
1	50	Trevor Huddleston	High Point Racing	Ford
2	1	Robbie Kennealy (R)	Jan's Towing Racing	Ford
3	71	Kyle Keller	Jan's Towing Racing	Ford
4	15	Thomas Annunziata	Venturini Motorsports	Toyota
5	13	Tanner Reif	Central Coast Racing	Ford
6	20	Jade Avedisian	Venturini Motorsports	Toyota
7	25	Taylor Reimer	Venturini Motorsports	Toyota
8	24	Connor Hall	Sigma Performance Services	Chevrolet
9	55	Andrew Chapman	High Point Racing	Ford
10	23	Spencer Gallagher	Clark Racing	Toyota
11	5	Eric Johnson Jr.	Jerry Pitts Racing	Toyota
12	51	Blake Lothian (R)	Strike Mamba Racing	Chevrolet
13	4	Monty Tipton	Nascimento Motorsports	Toyota
14	6	Gavin Ray	Jerry Pitts Racing	Toyota
15	72	Cody Dennison	Strike Mamba Racing	Chevrolet
16	77	Nick Joanides	Performance P–1 Motorsports	Toyota
17	12	Dustin Hillenburg	Fast Track Racing	Toyota
18	11	Bryce Haugeberg	Fast Track Racing	Ford
19	99	Michael Maples	Maples Motorsports	Chevrolet
20	05	David Smith	Shockwave Motorsports	Toyota
21	67	Shane Backes	Maples Motorsports	Chevrolet
Official starting lineup

== Race results ==
Fin	St	#	Driver	Team	Make	Laps	Led	Status	Pts
1	1	50	Trevor Huddleston	High Point Racing	Ford	150	105	Running	48
2	8	24	Connor Hall	Sigma Performance Services	Chevrolet	150	35	Running	43
3	2	1	Robbie Kennealy (R)	Jan's Towing Racing	Ford	150	0	Running	41
4	4	15	Thomas Annunziata	Venturini Motorsports	Toyota	150	0	Running	40
5	5	13	Tanner Reif	Central Coast Racing	Ford	150	0	Running	39
6	9	55	Andrew Chapman	High Point Racing	Ford	150	0	Running	38
7	14	6	Gavin Ray	Jerry Pitts Racing	Toyota	150	0	Running	37
8	12	51	Blake Lothian (R)	Strike Mamba Racing	Chevrolet	150	0	Running	36
9	7	25	Taylor Reimer	Venturini Motorsports	Toyota	150	0	Running	35
10	11	5	Eric Johnson Jr.	Jerry Pitts Racing	Toyota	150	0	Running	34
11	13	4	Monty Tipton	Nascimento Motorsports	Toyota	150	0	Running	33
12	6	20	Jade Avedisian	Venturini Motorsports	Toyota	150	0	Running	32
13	3	71	Kyle Keller	Jan's Towing Racing	Ford	148	10	Running	32
14	21	67	Shane Backes	Maples Motorsports	Chevrolet	144	0	Running	30
15	20	05	David Smith	Shockwave Motorsports	Toyota	140	0	Running	29
16	10	23	Spencer Gallagher	Clark Racing	Toyota	139	0	Running	28
17	16	77	Nick Joanides	Performance P–1 Motorsports	Toyota	88	0	Accident	27
18	17	12	Dustin Hillenburg	Fast Track Racing	Toyota	85	0	Mechanical	26
19	18	11	Bryce Haugeberg	Fast Track Racing	Ford	85	0	Running	25
20	15	72	Cody Dennison	Strike Mamba Racing	Chevrolet	66	0	Mechanical	24
21	19	99	Michael Maples	Maples Motorsports	Chevrolet	0	0	Did Not Start	23
Official race results

== Standings after the race ==
Drivers' Championship standings

	Pos	Driver	Points
	1	Trevor Huddleston	565
	2	Kyle Keller	531 (–34)
	3	Tanner Reif	518 (–47)
	4	Robbie Kennealy	516 (–49)
	5	Eric Johnson Jr.	507 (–58)
	6	Blake Lothian	457 (–108)
	7	David Smith	426 (–139)
	8	Jake Bollman	255 (–310)
	9	Todd Souza	229 (–336)
2	10	Andrew Chapman	154 (–411)

- Note: Only the first 10 positions are included for the driver standings.

Previous race: 2025 Madera 150	ARCA Menards Series West; 2025 season	Next race: 2025 Desert Diamond Casino West Valley 100
