= 2025 Owens Corning 200 =

20th race of the 2025 ARCA Menards Series

Race details
- Race 20 of 20 of the 2025 ARCA Menards Series
- Date: October 4, 2025
- Official name: 4th Annual Owens Corning 200
- Location: Toledo Speedway in Toledo, Ohio
- Course: Permanent racing facility
- Course length: 0.5 miles (0.804 km)
- Distance: 200 laps, 100 mi (161 km)
- Scheduled distance: 200 laps, 100 mi (161 km)
- Average speed: 84.230 mph (135.555 km/h)

Pole position
Driver	Max Reaves	Joe Gibbs Racing
- Time: 16.174

Most laps led
Driver	Max Reaves	Joe Gibbs Racing
- Laps: 199

Winner
No. 18	Max Reaves	Joe Gibbs Racing

Television in the United States
- Network: FS2
- Announcers: Eric Brennan and Phil Parsons

Radio in the United States
- Radio: ARCA Racing Network

The 2025 Owens Corning 200 was the 20th and final stock car race of the 2025 ARCA Menards Series season, and the 4th iteration of the event. The race was held on Saturday, October 4, 2025, at Toledo Speedway in Toledo, Ohio, a 0.5 mile (0.804 km) permanent oval shaped racetrack. The race took the scheduled 200 laps to complete. Max Reaves, driving for Joe Gibbs Racing, would put on a dominating performance, leading all but one lap from the pole position to earn his third career ARCA Menards Series win. To fill out the podium, Brenden Queen and Tristan McKee, both driving for Pinnacle Racing Group, would finish 2nd and 3rd, respectively.

With a second-place finish, Queen clinched the 2025 ARCA Menards Series championship by virtue of starting the race, 106 points ahead of Lavar Scott, who finished second in the points for the second consecutive year. Queen ended the season with eight wins and 17 top fives to secure the title.

== Report ==
=== Background ===
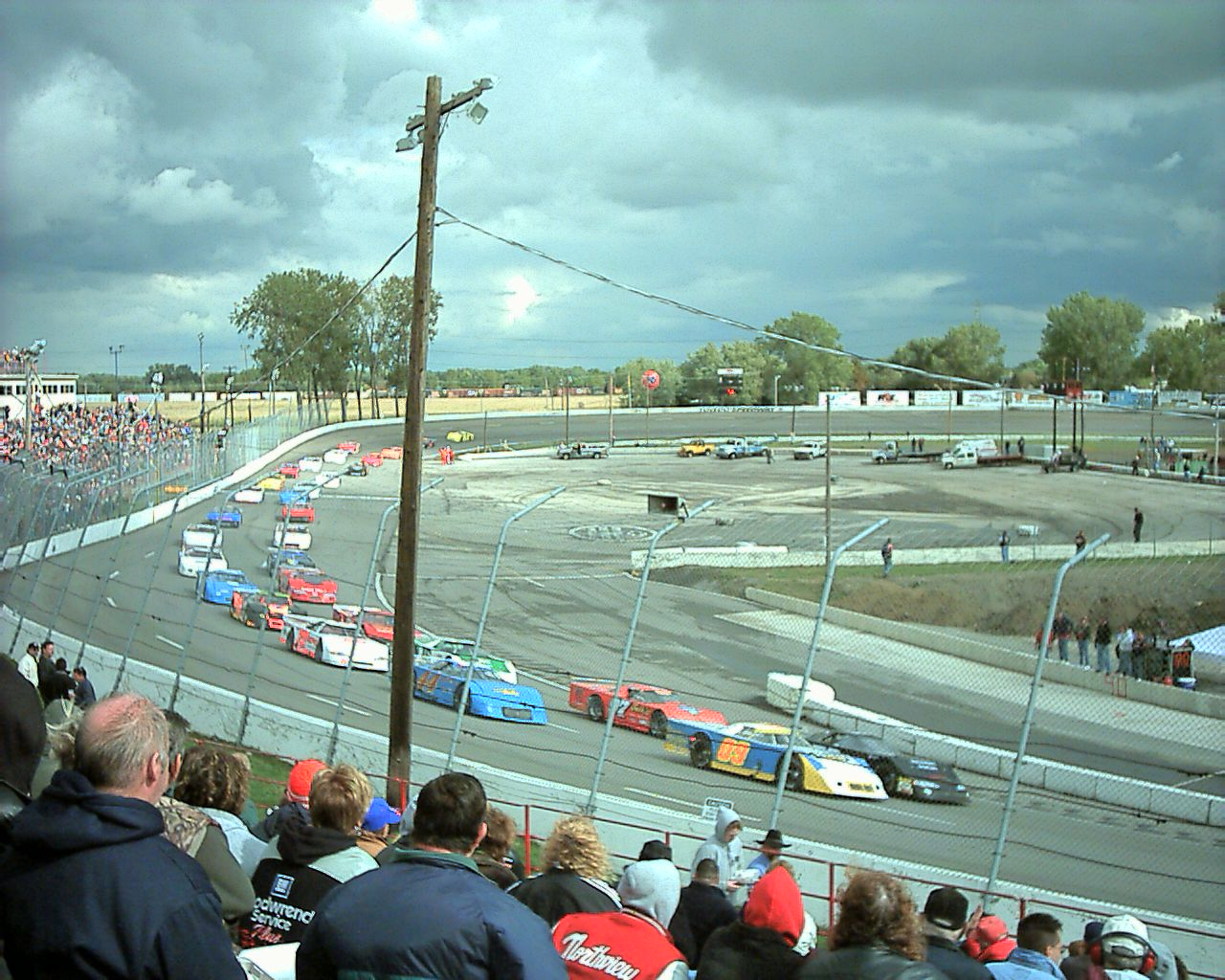
Toledo Speedway, the track where the race was held.

Toledo Speedway is a half-mile paved oval racetrack located in Toledo, Ohio, United States. It is owned jointly by Roy Mott and NASCAR. It is operated by NASCAR and run as the sister track to Flat Rock Speedway in Flat Rock, Michigan.

Toledo was one of the oldest tracks to still host an ARCA Menards Series race until 2019. Starting in 2020, after NASCAR bought ARCA, the race became part of the rebranded ARCA Menards Series East (former NASCAR K&N Pro Series East). However, due to COVID-19 related scheduling changes, the track ended up hosting three ARCA races in 2020, and returned on the national schedule in 2021.

==== Entry list ====
- (R) denotes rookie driver.

#	Driver	Team	Make
0	Nate Moeller	Wayne Peterson Racing	Toyota
03	Jeff Maconi	Clubb Racing Inc.	Ford
3	Willie Mullins	Mullins Racing	Ford
06	Brayton Laster (R)	Wayne Peterson Racing	Chevrolet
6	Lavar Scott	Rev Racing	Chevrolet
9	Matt Kemp	Fast Track Racing	Toyota
10	Mike Basham	Fast Track Racing	Ford
11	Tony Cosentino	Fast Track Racing	Ford
12	Takuma Koga	Fast Track Racing	Toyota
18	Max Reaves	Joe Gibbs Racing	Toyota
20	Julian DaCosta	Venturini Motorsports	Toyota
23	Tyler Reif	Sigma Performance Services	Chevrolet
25	Taylor Reimer	Venturini Motorsports	Toyota
28	Brenden Queen (R)	Pinnacle Racing Group	Chevrolet
31	Presley Sorah	Rise Motorsports	Toyota
48	Brad Smith	Brad Smith Motorsports	Ford
55	Isabella Robusto (R)	Venturini Motorsports	Toyota
67	Shane Backes	Maples Motorsports	Chevrolet
70	Justin Rothberg	Nitro Motorsports	Toyota
82	Tristan McKee	Pinnacle Racing Group	Chevrolet
85	Becca Monopoli	City Garage Motorsports	Ford
86	Alex Clubb	Clubb Racing Inc.	Ford
95	Jackson McLerran	MAN Motorsports	Toyota
97	Jason Kitzmiller	CR7 Motorsports	Chevrolet
99	Michael Maples	Maples Motorsports	Chevrolet
Official entry list

== Practice ==
The first and only practice session was held on Saturday, October 4, at 11:45 AM EST, and would last for 45 minutes. Max Reaves, driving for Joe Gibbs Racing, would set the fastest time in the session, with a lap of 16.245, and a speed of 110.803 mph (178.320 km/h).

Pos.	#	Driver	Team	Make	Time	Speed
1	18	Max Reaves	Joe Gibbs Racing	Toyota	16.245	110.803
2	82	Tristan McKee	Pinnacle Racing Group	Chevrolet	16.281	110.558
3	6	Lavar Scott	Rev Racing	Chevrolet	16.376	109.917
Full practice results

== Qualifying ==
Qualifying was held on Saturday, October 4, at 1:00 PM CST. The qualifying procedure used is a single-car, two-lap system with one round. Drivers will be on track by themselves and will have two laps to post a qualifying time, and whoever sets the fastest time will win the pole.

Max Reaves, driving for Joe Gibbs Racing, would score the pole for the race, with a lap of 16.174, and a speed of 111.290 mph (179.104 km/h).

=== Qualifying results ===
Pos.	#	Driver	Team	Make	Time	Speed
1	18	Max Reaves	Joe Gibbs Racing	Toyota	16.174	111.290
2	28	Brenden Queen (R)	Pinnacle Racing Group	Chevrolet	16.235	110.872
3	82	Tristan McKee	Pinnacle Racing Group	Chevrolet	16.254	110.742
4	6	Lavar Scott	Rev Racing	Chevrolet	16.370	109.957
5	20	Julian DaCosta	Venturini Motorsports	Toyota	16.391	109.816
6	55	Isabella Robusto (R)	Venturini Motorsports	Toyota	16.457	109.376
7	25	Taylor Reimer	Venturini Motorsports	Toyota	16.543	108.807
8	3	Willie Mullins	Mullins Racing	Ford	16.549	108.768
9	97	Jason Kitzmiller	CR7 Motorsports	Chevrolet	16.610	108.368
10	23	Tyler Reif	Sigma Performance Services	Chevrolet	16.718	107.668
11	12	Takuma Koga	Fast Track Racing	Toyota	16.857	106.781
12	95	Jackson McLerran	MAN Motorsports	Toyota	16.863	106.743
13	70	Justin Rothberg	Nitro Motorsports	Toyota	16.931	106.314
14	85	Becca Monopoli	City Garage Motorsports	Ford	17.308	103.998
15	11	Tony Cosentino	Fast Track Racing	Ford	17.438	103.223
16	9	Matt Kemp	Fast Track Racing	Toyota	17.592	102.319
17	99	Michael Maples	Maples Motorsports	Chevrolet	17.623	102.139
18	10	Mike Basham	Fast Track Racing	Ford	17.774	101.272
19	86	Alex Clubb	Clubb Racing Inc.	Ford	17.949	100.284
20	0	Nate Moeller	Wayne Peterson Racing	Toyota	17.967	100.184
21	67	Shane Backes	Maples Motorsports	Chevrolet	18.066	99.635
22	06	Brayton Laster (R)	Wayne Peterson Racing	Toyota	18.186	98.977
23	03	Jeff Maconi	Clubb Racing Inc.	Ford	18.367	98.002
24	48	Brad Smith	Brad Smith Motorsports	Ford	18.523	97.176
25	31	Presley Sorah	Rise Motorsports	Toyota	19.110	94.192
Official qualifying results

== Race results ==
Fin	St	#	Driver	Team	Make	Laps	Led	Status	Pts
1	1	18	Max Reaves	Joe Gibbs Racing	Toyota	200	199	Running	49
2	2	28	Brenden Queen (R)	Pinnacle Racing Group	Chevrolet	200	1	Running	93
3	3	82	Tristan McKee	Pinnacle Racing Group	Chevrolet	200	0	Running	41
4	6	55	Isabella Robusto (R)	Venturini Motorsports	Toyota	200	0	Running	90
5	10	23	Tyler Reif	Sigma Performance Services	Chevrolet	200	0	Running	39
6	7	25	Taylor Reimer	Venturini Motorsports	Toyota	199	0	Running	38
7	8	3	Willie Mullins	Mullins Racing	Ford	198	0	Running	37
8	5	20	Julian DaCosta	Venturini Motorsports	Toyota	196	0	Running	36
9	9	97	Jason Kitzmiller	CR7 Motorsports	Chevrolet	195	0	Running	85
10	14	85	Becca Monopoli	City Garage Motorsports	Ford	195	0	Running	34
11	15	11	Tony Cosentino	Fast Track Racing	Ford	193	0	Running	83
12	17	99	Michael Maples	Maples Motorsports	Chevrolet	190	0	Running	82
13	12	95	Jackson McLerran	MAN Motorsports	Toyota	189	0	Running	31
14	11	12	Takuma Koga	Fast Track Racing	Toyota	189	0	Running	30
15	19	86	Alex Clubb	Clubb Racing Inc.	Ford	188	0	Running	79
16	22	06	Brayton Laster (R)	Wayne Peterson Racing	Toyota	183	0	Running	78
17	13	70	Justin Rothberg	Nitro Motorsports	Toyota	183	0	Running	27
18	24	48	Brad Smith	Brad Smith Motorsports	Ford	182	0	Running	76
19	20	0	Nate Moeller	Wayne Peterson Racing	Toyota	182	0	Running	25
20	18	10	Mike Basham	Fast Track Racing	Ford	176	0	Running	24
21	23	03	Jeff Maconi	Clubb Racing Inc.	Ford	171	0	Running	23
22	4	6	Lavar Scott	Rev Racing	Chevrolet	83	0	Accident	72
23	16	9	Matt Kemp	Fast Track Racing	Toyota	8	0	Mechanical	21
24	25	31	Presley Sorah	Rise Motorsports	Toyota	2	0	Mechanical	20
25	21	67	Shane Backes	Maples Motorsports	Chevrolet	0	0	Mechanical	19
Official race results

== Standings after the race ==
Drivers' Championship standings

Pos	Driver	Points
1	Brenden Queen	1,034
2	Lavar Scott	928 (–106)
3	Jason Kitzmiller	854 (–180)
4	Isabella Robusto	846 (–188)
5	Lawless Alan	744 (–290)
6	Alex Clubb	743 (–291)
7	Michael Maples	729 (–305)
8	Brayton Laster	700 (–334)
9	Brad Smith	574 (–460)
10	Tony Cosentino	453 (–581)

- Note: Only the first 10 positions are included for the driver standings.

Previous race: 2025 Reese's 150	ARCA Menards Series; 2025 season	Next race: 2026 General Tire 200
