= 2025 Desert Diamond Casino West Valley 100 =

12th race of the 2025 ARCA Menards Series West

Race details
- Race 12 of 12 of the 2025 ARCA Menards Series West
- Date: November 1, 2025
- Official name: 53rd Annual Desert Diamond Casino West Valley 100
- Location: Phoenix Raceway in Avondale, Arizona
- Course: Permanent racing facility
- Course length: 1.022 miles (1.645 km)
- Distance: 100 laps, 100 mi (160 km)
- Scheduled distance: 100 laps, 100 mi (160 km)
- Average speed: 101.551 mph (163.430 km/h)

Pole position
Driver	Brent Crews	Joe Gibbs Racing
- Time: 27.464

Most laps led
Driver	Brent Crews	Brent Crews
- Laps: 100

Winner
No. 18	Brent Crews	Joe Gibbs Racing

Television in the United States
- Network: FloRacing
- Announcers: Charles Krall and Phil Parsons

Radio in the United States
- Radio: MRN

The 2025 Desert Diamond Casino West Valley 100 was the 12th and final stock car race of the 2025 ARCA Menards Series West, and the 53rd iteration of the event. The race was held on Saturday, November 1, 2025, at Phoenix Raceway in Avondale, Arizona, a 1 mile (1.6 km) tri-oval track. The race took the scheduled 100 laps to complete.

Brent Crews, driving for Joe Gibbs Racing, would pull off a dominating performance, leading every lap from the pole position to earn his second career ARCA Menards Series West win, and his second of the season. To fill out the podium, Carson Brown, driving for Pinnacle Racing Group, and Thomas Annunziata, driving for Nitro Motorsports, would finish 2nd and 3rd, respectively.

After taking a lap in practice, Trevor Huddleston clinched the 2025 ARCA Menards Series West championship, his first in the series after finishing third in the two previous seasons.

== Report ==
=== Background ===
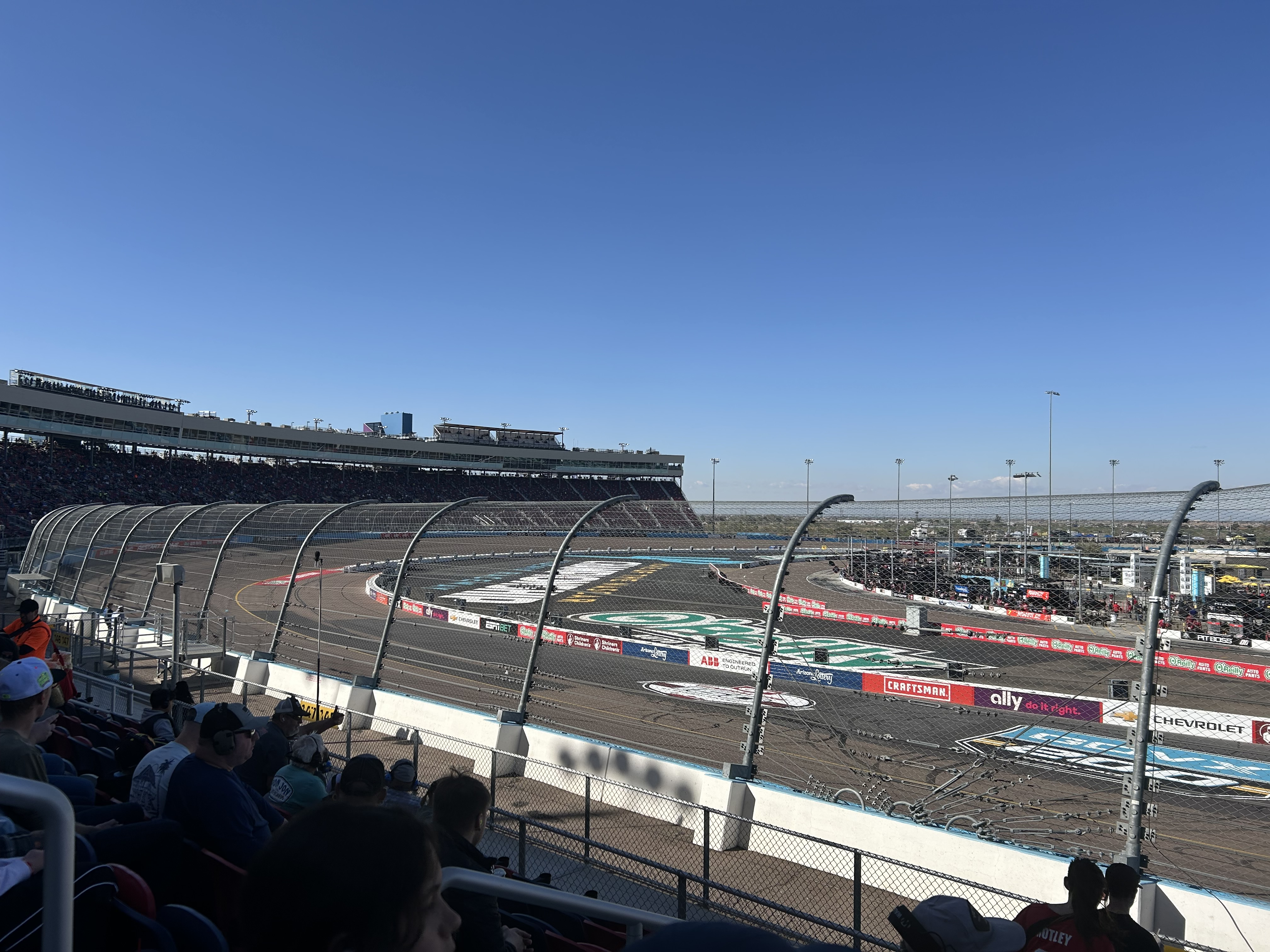
Phoenix Raceway, the track where the race will be held.

Phoenix Raceway – also known as PIR – is a one-mile, low-banked tri-oval race track located in Avondale, Arizona. It is named after the nearby metropolitan area of Phoenix. The motorsport track opened in 1964 and currently hosts two NASCAR race weekends annually. PIR has also hosted the IndyCar Series, CART, USAC and the Rolex Sports Car Series. The raceway is currently owned and operated by International Speedway Corporation.

The raceway was originally constructed with a 2.5 mi (4.0 km) road course that ran both inside and outside of the main tri-oval. In 1991, the track was reconfigured with the current 1.51 mi (2.43 km) interior layout. PIR has an estimated grandstand seating capacity of around 67,000. Lights were installed around the track in 2004 following the addition of a second annual NASCAR race weekend.

Phoenix Raceway is home to two annual NASCAR race weekends, one of 13 facilities on the NASCAR schedule to host more than one race weekend a year. The track is both the first and last stop in the western United States, as well as the fourth, and hosts the championship race on the schedule. In 2026, Homestead-Miami would host the championship race, while Phoenix would retain its second date in the Round of 8.

==== Entry list ====
- (R) denotes rookie driver.

#	Driver	Team	Make
1	Robbie Kennealy (R)	Jan's Towing Racing	Ford
2	Isabella Robusto	RAFA Racing Team	Toyota
4	Monty Tipton	Nascimento Motorsports	Toyota
05	David Smith	Shockwave Motorsports	Toyota
5	Eric Johnson Jr.	Jerry Pitts Racing	Toyota
6	Gavin Ray	Jerry Pitts Racing	Toyota
09	Derek Kraus	Shockwave Motorsports	Toyota
13	Jade Avedisian	Central Coast Racing	Toyota
15	Jake Finch	Phoenix Racing	Toyota
17	Kaylee Bryson	Cook Racing Technologies	Chevrolet
18	Brent Crews	Joe Gibbs Racing	Toyota
20	Leland Honeyman	Nitro Motorsports	Toyota
24	Connor Hall	Sigma Performance Services	Chevrolet
25	Taylor Reimer	Nitro Motorsports	Toyota
28	Carson Brown	Pinnacle Racing Group	Chevrolet
31	Chase Howard	Rise Motorsports	Toyota
46	Thad Moffitt	Nitro Motorsports	Toyota
50	Trevor Huddleston	High Point Racing	Ford
51	Blake Lothian (R)	Strike Mamba Racing	Chevrolet
55	Andrew Chapman	High Point Racing	Ford
67	Shane Backes	Maples Motorsports	Chevrolet
70	Thomas Annunziata	Nitro Motorsports	Toyota
71	Kyle Keller	Jan's Towing Racing	Ford
72	Cody Dennison	Strike Mamba Racing	Chevrolet
77	Tristan McKee	Spire Motorsports	Chevrolet
99	Michael Maples	Maples Motorsports	Chevrolet
Official entry list

== Practice ==
The first and only practice session was held on Friday, October 31, at 11:00 AM MST, and would last for 45 minutes. Brent Crews, driving for Joe Gibbs Racing, would set the fastest time in the session, with a lap of 27.650, and a speed of 130.199 mph (209.535 km/h).

Pos.	#	Driver	Team	Make	Time	Speed
1	18	Brent Crews	Joe Gibbs Racing	Toyota	27.650	130.199
2	20	Leland Honeyman	Nitro Motorsports	Toyota	28.135	127.955
3	70	Thomas Annunziata	Nitro Motorsports	Toyota	28.158	127.850
Full practice results

== Qualifying ==
Qualifying was held on Friday, October 31, at 12:00 PM MST. The qualifying procedure used is a multi-car, multi lap-based system. All drivers will be on track for a 20-minute timed session, and whoever sets the fastest time in that session will win the pole.

Brent Crews, driving for Joe Gibbs Racing, would score the pole for the race, with a lap of 27.464, and a speed of 131.081 mph (210.954 km/h).

=== Qualifying results ===
Pos.	#	Driver	Team	Make	Time	Speed
1	18	Brent Crews	Joe Gibbs Racing	Toyota	27.464	131.081
2	77	Tristan McKee	Spire Motorsports	Chevrolet	27.668	130.114
3	25	Taylor Reimer	Nitro Motorsports	Toyota	27.731	129.819
4	28	Carson Brown	Pinnacle Racing Group	Chevrolet	27.737	129.791
5	70	Thomas Annunziata	Nitro Motorsports	Toyota	27.761	129.678
6	13	Jade Avedisian	Central Coast Racing	Toyota	27.838	129.320
7	24	Connor Hall	Sigma Performance Services	Chevrolet	27.884	129.106
8	15	Jake Finch	Phoenix Racing	Toyota	27.915	128.963
9	20	Leland Honeyman	Nitro Motorsports	Chevrolet	27.939	128.852
10	46	Thad Moffitt	Nitro Motorsports	Chevrolet	27.968	128.719
11	1	Robbie Kennealy (R)	Jan's Towing Racing	Ford	28.022	128.470
12	2	Isabella Robusto	RAFA Racing Team	Toyota	28.080	128.205
13	4	Monty Tipton	Nascimento Motorsports	Toyota	28.170	127.796
14	50	Trevor Huddleston	High Point Racing	Ford	28.172	127.786
15	71	Kyle Keller	Jan's Towing Racing	Ford	28.333	127.060
16	09	Derek Kraus	Shockwave Motorsports	Toyota	28.682	125.514
17	5	Eric Johnson Jr.	Jerry Pitts Racing	Toyota	28.734	125.287
18	17	Kaylee Bryson	Cook Racing Technologies	Chevrolet	28.879	124.658
19	51	Blake Lothian (R)	Strike Mamba Racing	Chevrolet	28.970	124.266
20	6	Gavin Ray	Jerry Pitts Racing	Toyota	29.022	124.044
21	72	Cody Dennison	Strike Mamba Racing	Chevrolet	29.356	122.633
22	55	Andrew Chapman	High Point Racing	Ford	29.455	122.220
23	99	Michael Maples	Maples Motorsports	Chevrolet	30.555	117.820
24	05	David Smith	Shockwave Motorsports	Toyota	31.045	115.961
25	31	Chase Howard	Rise Motorsports	Toyota	–	–
26	67	Shane Backes	Maples Motorsports	Chevrolet	–	–
Official qualifying results

== Race results ==
Fin	St	#	Driver	Team	Make	Laps	Led	Status	Pts
1	1	18	Brent Crews	Joe Gibbs Racing	Toyota	100	100	Running	49
2	4	28	Carson Brown	Pinnacle Racing Group	Chevrolet	100	0	Running	42
3	5	70	Thomas Annunziata	Nitro Motorsports	Toyota	100	0	Running	91
4	2	77	Tristan McKee	Spire Motorsports	Chevrolet	100	0	Running	40
5	9	20	Leland Honeyman	Nitro Motorsports	Toyota	100	0	Running	39
6	11	1	Robbie Kennealy (R)	Jan's Towing Racing	Ford	100	0	Running	88
7	7	24	Connor Hall	Sigma Performance Services	Chevrolet	100	0	Running	87
8	10	46	Thad Moffitt	Nitro Motorsports	Toyota	100	0	Running	36
9	8	15	Jake Finch	Phoenix Racing	Toyota	100	0	Running	35
10	14	50	Trevor Huddleston	High Point Racing	Ford	100	0	Running	84
11	12	2	Isabella Robusto	RAFA Racing Team	Toyota	100	0	Running	33
12	3	25	Taylor Reimer	Nitro Motorsports	Toyota	100	0	Running	82
13	20	6	Gavin Ray	Jerry Pitts Racing	Toyota	98	0	Running	81
14	16	09	Derek Kraus	Shockwave Motorsports	Toyota	98	0	Running	30
15	15	71	Kyle Keller	Jan's Towing Racing	Ford	98	0	Running	79
16	19	51	Blake Lothian (R)	Strike Mamba Racing	Chevrolet	98	0	Running	78
17	13	4	Monty Tipton	Nascimento Motorsports	Toyota	98	0	Running	77
18	18	17	Kaylee Bryson	Cook Racing Technologies	Chevrolet	98	0	Running	26
19	6	13	Jade Avedisian	Central Coast Racing	Toyota	97	0	Running	75
20	17	5	Eric Johnson Jr.	Jerry Pitts Racing	Toyota	97	0	Running	74
21	22	55	Andrew Chapman	High Point Racing	Ford	97	0	Running	73
22	21	72	Cody Dennison	Strike Mamba Racing	Chevrolet	97	0	Running	72
23	25	31	Chase Howard	Rise Motorsports	Toyota	95	0	Running	21
24	26	67	Shane Backes	Maples Motorsports	Chevrolet	94	0	Running	70
25	24	05	David Smith	Shockwave Motorsports	Toyota	91	0	Running	69
26	23	99	Michael Maples	Maples Motorsports	Chevrolet	0	0	Did Not Start	68
Official race results

== Standings after the race ==
Drivers' Championship standings

	Pos	Driver	Points
	1	Trevor Huddleston	650
	2	Kyle Keller	610 (–40)
1	3	Robbie Kennealy	604 (–46)
1	4	Eric Johnson Jr.	581 (–69)
1	5	Blake Lothian	535 (–115)
3	6	Tanner Reif	518 (–132)
	7	David Smith	495 (–155)
	8	Jake Bollman	255 (–395)
	9	Todd Souza	229 (–421)
	10	Andrew Chapman	227 (–423)

- Note: Only the first 10 positions are included for the driver standings.

Previous race: 2025 Star Nursery 150	ARCA Menards Series West; 2025 season	Next race: 2026 Oil Workers 150
