= 2025 Colorado 150 =

4th race of the 2025 ARCA Menards Series West

Race details
- Race 4 of 12 of the 2025 ARCA Menards Series West
- Date: May 24, 2025
- Official name: First Annual Colorado 150
- Location: Colorado National Speedway in Dacono, Colorado
- Course: Permanent racing facility
- Course length: 0.375 miles (0.604 km)
- Distance: 60 laps, 22.5 mi (36.24 km)
- Scheduled distance: 150 laps, 56.25 mi (90.52 km)

Pole position
Driver	Jake Bollman	Bill McAnally Racing
- Time: 16.608

Most laps led
Driver	Jake Bollman	Bill McAnally Racing
- Laps: 60

Winner
No. 19	Jake Bollman	Bill McAnally Racing

Television in the United States
- Network: FloRacing
- Announcers: Charles Krall

Radio in the United States
- Radio: ARCA Racing Network

The 2025 Colorado 150 was the 4th stock car race of the 2025 ARCA Menards Series West season, and the first running of the event. The race was held on Saturday, May 24, 2025, at Colorado National Speedway in Dacono, Colorado, a 0.375 mile (0.604 km) permanent asphalt oval shaped short track. Originally scheduled to be contested over 150 laps, the race was called after just 60 laps due to heavy rain showers in the area. Jake Bollman, driving for Bill McAnally Racing, would start from the pole and lead all 60 laps of the race to earn his first career ARCA Menards Series West win, and the historic 100th win for BMR in the West Series. To fill out the podium, Kyle Keller, driving for Jan's Towing Racing, and Trevor Huddleston, driving for High Point Racing, would finish 2nd and 3rd, respectively.

== Report ==
=== Background ===
Colorado National Speedway is a paved oval in Dacono, Colorado, spanning 0.375 mi (0.604 km). The track is currently a member of the NASCAR Advance Auto Parts Weekly Series and hosts the ARCA Menards Series West (former NASCAR K&N Pro Series West), the King of the Wing Sprint Car Series, and the North American Big Rig Racing Series annually.

Founded in 1965 by Gene and Gerda Heffley, Colorado National Speedway sits at the foot of the Rocky Mountains at exit 232 off of I-25. Each summer, CNS hosts some of the best local racing in the country; along with several national touring series, car and motorcycle shows, swap meets, and an annual Father's Day Sunday Super Show featuring Monster Trucks, Stunt Bikes, and more. The Speedway opens for practice in April, racing begins in May, and events run through October. CNS is known locally for outstanding food, affordable tickets, and Northern Colorado's best fireworks display on holiday and special race events.

==== Entry list ====
- (R) denotes rookie driver.

#	Driver	Team	Make	Sponsor
1	Robbie Kennealy (R)	Jan's Towing Racing	Ford	Jan's Towing
3	Todd Souza	Central Coast Racing	Toyota	Central Coast Cabinets
05	David Smith	Shockwave Motorsports	Toyota	Shockwave Marine Suspension Seating
5	Eric Johnson Jr.	Jerry Pitts Racing	Toyota	Sherwin-Williams
13	Tanner Reif	Central Coast Racing	Toyota	Central Coast Cabinets
19	Jake Bollman (R)	Bill McAnally Racing	Chevrolet	NAPA 100th Anniversary
23	Eric Rhead	Sigma Performance Services	Toyota	CRG Motorsports / Speedwagan / Phils Fabrication
50	Trevor Huddleston	High Point Racing	Ford	High Point Racing / Racecar Factory
51	Blake Lothian (R)	Strike Mamba Racing	Chevrolet	Texas Lawbook
71	Kyle Keller	Jan's Towing Racing	Ford	Jan's Towing
72	Holly Clark	Strike Mamba Racing	Chevrolet	Subway
77	Mariah Boudrieau	Performance P–1 Motorsports	Toyota	REX MD / All Phase Construction / Wallace Sign
Official entry list

== Practice ==
The first and only practice session was held on Saturday, May 24, at 3:45 PM MST, and would last for 60 minutes. Kyle Keller, driving for Jan's Towing Racing, would set the fastest time in the session, with a lap of 16.790, and a speed of 80.405 mph (129.399 km/h).

Pos.	#	Driver	Team	Make	Time	Speed
1	71	Kyle Keller	Jan's Towing Racing	Ford	16.790	80.405
2	13	Tanner Reif	Central Coast Racing	Toyota	16.823	80.247
3	50	Trevor Huddleston	High Point Racing	Ford	16.862	80.062
Full practice results

== Qualifying ==
Qualifying was held on Saturday, May 24, at 5:50 PM MST. The qualifying procedure used is a single-car, two-lap system with one round. Drivers will be on track by themselves and will have two laps to post a qualifying time, and whoever sets the fastest time will win the pole.

Jake Bollman, driving for Bill McAnally Racing, would score the pole for the race, with a lap of 16.608, and a speed of 81.286 mph (130.817 km/h).

=== Qualifying results ===
Pos.	#	Driver	Team	Make	Time	Speed
1	19	Jake Bollman (R)	Bill McAnally Racing	Chevrolet	16.608	81.286
2	71	Kyle Keller	Jan's Towing Racing	Ford	16.734	80.674
3	3	Todd Souza	Central Coast Racing	Toyota	16.875	80.000
4	50	Trevor Huddleston	High Point Racing	Ford	16.904	79.863
5	1	Robbie Kennealy (R)	Jan's Towing Racing	Ford	16.904	79.863
6	13	Tanner Reif	Central Coast Racing	Toyota	16.935	79.717
7	5	Eric Johnson Jr.	Jerry Pitts Racing	Toyota	16.945	79.670
8	51	Blake Lothian (R)	Strike Mamba Racing	Chevrolet	17.184	78.561
9	23	Eric Rhead	Sigma Performance Services	Toyota	17.371	77.716
10	72	Holly Clark	Strike Mamba Racing	Chevrolet	17.406	77.559
11	77	Mariah Boudrieau	Performance P–1 Motorsports	Toyota	17.819	75.762
12	05	David Smith	Shockwave Motorsports	Toyota	18.199	74.180
Official qualifying results

== Race results ==
Fin	St	#	Driver	Team	Make	Laps	Led	Status	Pts
1	1	19	Jake Bollman (R)	Bill McAnally Racing	Chevrolet	60	60	Running	49
2	2	71	Kyle Keller	Jan's Towing Racing	Ford	60	0	Running	42
3	4	50	Trevor Huddleston	High Point Racing	Ford	60	0	Running	41
4	7	5	Eric Johnson Jr.	Jerry Pitts Racing	Toyota	60	0	Running	40
5	6	13	Tanner Reif	Central Coast Racing	Toyota	60	0	Running	39
6	5	1	Robbie Kennealy (R)	Jan's Towing Racing	Ford	60	0	Running	38
7	3	3	Todd Souza	Central Coast Racing	Toyota	60	0	Running	37
8	8	51	Blake Lothian (R)	Strike Mamba Racing	Chevrolet	60	0	Running	36
9	9	23	Eric Rhead	Sigma Performance Services	Toyota	60	0	Running	35
10	10	72	Holly Clark	Strike Mamba Racing	Chevrolet	59	0	Running	34
11	12	05	David Smith	Shockwave Motorsports	Toyota	58	0	Running	33
12	11	77	Mariah Boudrieau	Performance P–1 Motorsports	Toyota	58	0	Running	32
Official race results

== Standings after the race ==
Drivers' Championship standings

	Pos	Driver	Points
1	1	Trevor Huddleston	161
1	2	Tanner Reif	159 (-2)
	3	Eric Johnson Jr.	155 (–6)
	4	Kyle Keller	154 (–7)
	5	Robbie Kennealy	150 (–11)
1	6	Blake Lothian	131 (–30)
1	7	David Smith	114 (–47)
1	8	Jake Bollman	112 (–49)
3	9	Cody Dennison	98 (–63)
5	10	Todd Souza	75 (–86)

- Note: Only the first 10 positions are included for the driver standings.

Previous race: 2025 ARCA Menards Series West 150	ARCA Menards Series West; 2025 season	Next race: 2025 NAPA Auto Parts 150 (Kern Raceway)
