= 2024 General Tire 150 (Phoenix) =

2nd race of the 2024 ARCA Menards Series

Race details
- Race 2 of 20 of the 2024 ARCA Menards Series; Race 1 of 12 of the 2024 ARCA Menards Series West
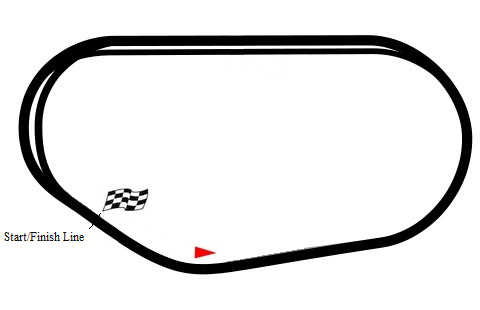
- Date: March 8, 2024
- Official name: 5th Annual General Tire 150
- Location: Phoenix Raceway in Avondale, Arizona
- Course: Permanent racing facility
- Course length: 1 miles (1.6 km)
- Distance: 115 laps, 115 mi (185 km)
- Scheduled distance: 150 laps, 150 mi (240 km)
- Average speed: 86.142 mph (138.632 km/h)

Pole position
Driver	William Sawalich	Joe Gibbs Racing
- Time: 27.316

Most laps led
Driver	William Sawalich	Joe Gibbs Racing
- Laps: 66

Winner
No. 18	William Sawalich	Joe Gibbs Racing

Television in the United States
- Network: FS1
- Announcers: Jamie Little, Phil Parsons, and Trevor Bayne

Radio in the United States
- Radio: MRN

The 2024 General Tire 150 was the second stock car race of the 2024 ARCA Menards Series season, the first race of the 2024 ARCA Menards Series West season, and the 5th running of the event. The race was held on Friday, March 8, 2024, at Phoenix Raceway in Avondale, Arizona, a 1-mile (1.6 km) permanent asphalt tri-oval shaped speedway. The race was originally scheduled to be contested over 150 laps, but was decreased to 115 laps due to lightning and rain in the area. William Sawalich, driving for Joe Gibbs Racing, would dominate the majority of the race, winning the pole and leading a race-high 66 laps to earn his fifth career ARCA Menards Series win, his second career ARCA Menards Series West win, and his first of the season. Sawalich's closest competition was Gio Ruggiero, who led 49 laps in the race before finishing in 2nd. To fill out the podium, Ruggiero, driving for Venturini Motorsports, and Grant Enfinger, driving for Sigma Performance Services, would finish 2nd and 3rd, respectively.

== Report ==
=== Background ===
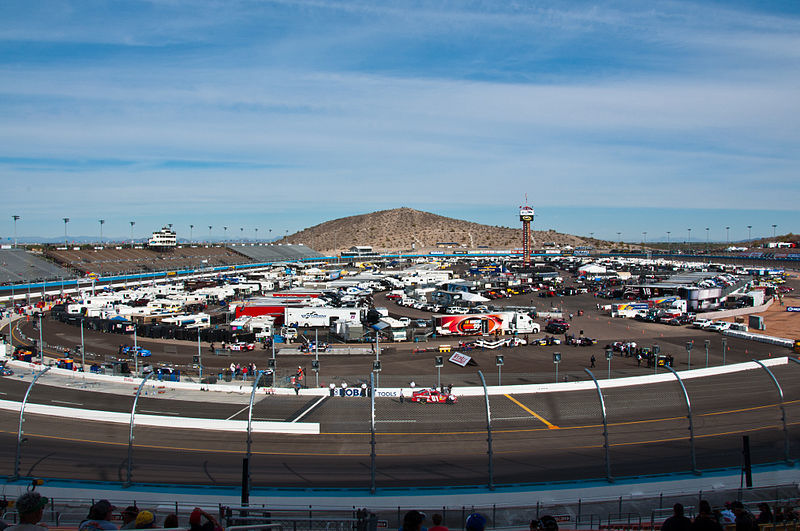
Phoenix Raceway, the circuit where the race will be held.

Phoenix Raceway is a 1-mile, low-banked tri-oval race track located in Avondale, Arizona, near Phoenix. The motorsport track opened in 1964 and currently hosts two NASCAR race weekends annually including the final championship race since 2020. Phoenix Raceway has also hosted the CART, IndyCar Series, USAC and the WeatherTech SportsCar Championship. The raceway is currently owned and operated by NASCAR.

=== Entry list ===
43 drivers are entered for the General Tire 150, marking the second race in a row where drivers will fail to qualify for a race.

- (R) denotes rookie driver.

#	Driver	Team	Make	Sponsor
1	Robbie Kennealy (R)	Kennealy Keller Motorsports	Ford	Setting The Stage / Wiley X
2	Andrés Pérez de Lara	Rev Racing	Chevrolet	Max Siegel Inc.
03	Alex Clubb	Clubb Racing Inc.	Ford	Yavapai Bottle Gas
3	Todd Souza	Central Coast Racing	Toyota	Central Coast Cabinets
05	David Smith	Shockwave Motorsports	Toyota	Shockwave Marine Suspension Seating
06	Cody Dennison (R)	Wayne Peterson Racing	Toyota	Karrus
6	Lavar Scott (R)	Rev Racing	Chevrolet	Max Siegel Inc.
07	Danica Dart (R)	Kennealy Keller Motorsports	Chevrolet	Evers Farms / Pioneer Performance
7	Takuma Koga	Jerry Pitts Racing	Toyota	Yamada
10	Brayton Laster	Fast Track Racing	Ford	CarAggio Motorsports
11	Brad Perez	Fast Track Racing	Ford	Sebetka Bail Bonds
12	Ryan Roulette	Fast Track Racing	Ford	VFW / Bellator Recruiting Academy
13	Tyler Reif	Central Coast Racing	Toyota	Central Coast Cabinets
15	Kris Wright	Venturini Motorsports	Toyota	FNB Corporation
16	Jack Wood	Bill McAnally Racing	Chevrolet	NAPA Auto Care
17	Marco Andretti	Cook Racing Technologies	Chevrolet	Group 1001
18	William Sawalich	Joe Gibbs Racing	Toyota	Starkey / SoundGear
19	Eric Johnson Jr. (R)	Bill McAnally Racing	Chevrolet	Pacific Office Automation
20	Gio Ruggiero	Venturini Motorsports	Toyota	JBL
22	Amber Balcaen	Venturini Motorsports	Toyota	ICON Direct
23	Grant Enfinger	Sigma Performance Services	Chevrolet	GMS Fabrication / Allegiant Air
24	Joe Farré	Sigma Performance Services	Chevrolet	Fisher Industries
25	Toni Breidinger	Venturini Motorsports	Toyota	Raising Cane's Chicken Fingers
27	Bobby Hillis Jr.	Fierce Creature Racing	Chevrolet	Camping World / First Impression Press
28	Connor Mosack	Pinnacle Racing Group	Chevrolet	Chevrolet Performance
31	Garrett Zacharias	Rise Motorsports	Chevrolet	Hottle Livestock / Master K's BBQ
32	Christian Rose	AM Racing	Ford	West Virginia Department of Tourism
34	Isaac Johnson	Greg Van Alst Motorsports	Ford	IAC / Endress & Hauser
35	Greg Van Alst	Greg Van Alst Motorsports	Ford	Prescott Tire Pros
41	Johnny Borneman III	Lowden Jackson Motorsports	Ford	Tilly's / Stoney's
42	Tanner Reif	Cook Racing Technologies	Chevrolet	Vegas Fastener Manufacturing
48	Brad Smith	Brad Smith Motorsports	Chevrolet	Copraya.com
50	Trevor Huddleston	High Point Racing	Ford	High Point Racing / Racecar Factory
55	Isabella Robusto	Venturini Motorsports	Toyota	Mobil 1
61	Sean Hingorani	Hattori Racing Enterprises	Toyota	Fidelity Capital
63	John Aramendia	Spraker Racing Enterprises	Chevrolet	First Call Plumbing Heating & Air
70	Kyle Keller	Kennealy Keller Motorsports	Ford	Setting The Stage / Battle Born
71	Nick Joanides	Jan's Towing Racing	Ford	Jan's Towing
73	Andy Jankowiak	KLAS Motorsports	Toyota	Galactic Acres
77	Cody Kiemele	Performance P-1 Motorsports	Toyota	King Taco / Toyota of Redlands
88	Jake Bollman	Naake-Klauer Motorsports	Ford	Pacific Coast Propane
93	Caleb Costner (R)	Costner Weaver Motorsports	Chevrolet	Strapinno
99	Michael Maples (R)	Fast Track Racing	Chevrolet	Don Ray Petroleum LLC
Official entry list

== Practice ==
The first and only practice session was held on Friday, March 8, at 1:30 PM MST, and would last for 45 minutes. William Sawalich, driving for Joe Gibbs Racing, would set the fastest time in the session, with a lap of 27.598, and a speed of 130.444 mph (209.929 km/h).

Pos.	#	Driver	Team	Make	Time	Speed
1	18	William Sawalich	Joe Gibbs Racing	Toyota	27.598	130.444
2	20	Gio Ruggiero	Venturini Motorsports	Toyota	27.765	129.660
3	61	Sean Hingorani	Hattori Racing Enterprises	Toyota	28.035	128.411
Full practice results

== Qualifying ==
Qualifying was held on Friday, March 8, at 2:30 PM MST. The qualifying system used is a multi-car, multi-lap based system. All drivers will be on track for a 20-minute timed session, and whoever sets the fastest time in that session will win the pole.

William Sawalich, driving for Joe Gibbs Racing, would score the pole for the race, with a lap of 27.316, and a speed of 131.791 mph (212.097 km/h).

Three drivers would fail to qualify: Garrett Zacharias, Cody Dennison, and Brad Smith.

=== Qualifying results ===
Pos.	#	Driver	Team	Make	Time	Speed
1	18	William Sawalich	Joe Gibbs Racing	Toyota	27.316	131.791
2	61	Sean Hingorani	Hattori Racing Enterprises	Toyota	27.401	131.382
3	20	Gio Ruggiero	Venturini Motorsports	Toyota	27.509	130.866
4	2	Andrés Pérez de Lara	Rev Racing	Chevrolet	27.591	130.477
5	23	Grant Enfinger	Sigma Performance Services	Chevrolet	27.593	130.468
6	55	Isabella Robusto	Venturini Motorsports	Toyota	27.706	129.936
7	13	Tyler Reif	Central Coast Racing	Toyota	27.862	129.208
8	16	Jack Wood	Bill McAnally Racing	Chevrolet	27.912	128.977
9	15	Kris Wright	Venturini Motorsports	Toyota	27.918	128.949
10	6	Lavar Scott (R)	Rev Racing	Chevrolet	28.044	128.370
11	25	Toni Breidinger	Venturini Motorsports	Toyota	28.066	128.269
12	32	Christian Rose	AM Racing	Ford	28.146	127.904
13	88	Jake Bollman	Naake-Klauer Motorsports	Ford	28.258	127.398
14	73	Andy Jankowiak	KLAS Motorsports	Toyota	28.323	127.105
15	19	Eric Johnson Jr. (R)	Bill McAnally Racing	Chevrolet	28.370	126.895
16	22	Amber Balcaen	Venturini Motorsports	Toyota	28.371	126.890
17	17	Marco Andretti	Cook Racing Technologies	Chevrolet	28.404	126.743
18	35	Greg Van Alst	Greg Van Alst Motorsports	Ford	28.421	126.667
19	28	Connor Mosack	Pinnacle Racing Group	Chevrolet	28.458	126.502
20	71	Nick Joanides	Jan's Towing Racing	Ford	28.509	126.276
21	50	Trevor Huddleston	High Point Racing	Ford	28.578	125.971
22	7	Takuma Koga	Jerry Pitts Racing	Toyota	28.586	125.936
23	70	Kyle Keller	Kennealy Keller Motorsports	Ford	28.631	125.738
24	3	Todd Souza	Central Coast Racing	Toyota	28.683	125.510
25	41	Johnny Borneman III	Lowden Jackson Motorsports	Ford	28.705	125.414
26	42	Tanner Reif	Cook Racing Technologies	Chevrolet	28.751	125.213
27	34	Isaac Johnson	Greg Van Alst Motorsports	Ford	28.877	124.667
28	24	Joe Farré	Sigma Performance Services	Chevrolet	28.991	124.176
29	1	Robbie Kennealy (R)	Kennealy Keller Motorsports	Ford	29.138	123.550
30	93	Caleb Costner (R)	Costner Weaver Motorsports	Chevrolet	29.241	123.115
31	63	John Aramendia	Spraker Racing Enterprises	Chevrolet	29.492	122.067
32	11	Brad Perez	Fast Track Racing	Ford	29.589	121.667
33	07	Danica Dart (R)	Kennealy Keller Motorsports	Chevrolet	29.594	121.646
34	77	Cody Kiemele	Performance P-1 Motorsports	Toyota	30.148	119.411
35	03	Alex Clubb	Clubb Racing Inc.	Ford	30.186	119.261
36	10	Brayton Laster	Fast Track Racing	Ford	30.397	118.433
37	12	Ryan Roulette	Fast Track Racing	Ford	30.466	118.165
38	99	Michael Maples (R)	Fast Track Racing	Chevrolet	30.781	116.955
39	27	Bobby Hillis Jr.	Fierce Creature Racing	Chevrolet	32.530	110.667
40	05	David Smith	Shockwave Motorsports	Toyota	–	–
Failed to qualify
41	31	Garrett Zacharias	Rise Motorsports	Chevrolet	29.810	120.765
42	06	Cody Dennison (R)	Wayne Peterson Racing	Toyota	30.069	119.725
43	48	Brad Smith	Brad Smith Motorsports	Chevrolet	–	–
Official qualifying results

== Race results ==
Fin	St	#	Driver	Team	Make	Laps	Led	Status	Pts
1	1	18	William Sawalich	Joe Gibbs Racing	Toyota	115	66	Running	49
2	3	20	Gio Ruggiero	Venturini Motorsports	Toyota	115	49	Running	43
3	5	23	Grant Enfinger	Sigma Performance Services	Chevrolet	115	0	Running	41
4	19	28	Connor Mosack	Pinnacle Racing Group	Chevrolet	115	0	Running	40
5	2	61	Sean Hingorani	Hattori Racing Enterprises	Toyota	115	0	Running	39
6	6	55	Isabella Robusto	Venturini Motorsports	Toyota	115	0	Running	38
7	8	16	Jack Wood	Bill McAnally Racing	Chevrolet	115	0	Running	37
8	4	2	Andrés Pérez de Lara	Rev Racing	Chevrolet	115	0	Running	36
9	11	25	Toni Breidinger	Venturini Motorsports	Toyota	115	0	Running	35
10	10	6	Lavar Scott (R)	Rev Racing	Chevrolet	115	0	Running	34
11	7	13	Tyler Reif	Central Coast Racing	Toyota	115	0	Running	33
12	9	15	Kris Wright	Venturini Motorsports	Toyota	115	0	Running	32
13	18	35	Greg Van Alst	Greg Van Alst Motorsports	Ford	115	0	Running	31
14	26	42	Tanner Reif	Cook Racing Technologies	Chevrolet	115	0	Running	30
15	16	22	Amber Balcaen	Venturini Motorsports	Toyota	115	0	Running	29
16	12	32	Christian Rose	AM Racing	Ford	115	0	Running	28
17	21	50	Trevor Huddleston	High Point Racing	Ford	115	0	Running	27
18	23	70	Kyle Keller	Kennealy Keller Motorsports	Ford	115	0	Running	26
19	24	3	Todd Souza	Central Coast Racing	Toyota	114	0	Running	25
20	15	19	Eric Johnson Jr. (R)	Bill McAnally Racing	Chevrolet	114	0	Running	24
21	17	17	Marco Andretti	Cook Racing Technologies	Chevrolet	114	0	Running	23
22	29	1	Robbie Kennealy (R)	Kennealy Keller Motorsports	Ford	114	0	Running	22
23	22	7	Takuma Koga	Jerry Pitts Racing	Toyota	114	0	Running	21
24	27	34	Isaac Johnson	Greg Van Alst Motorsports	Ford	113	0	Running	20
25	30	93	Caleb Costner (R)	Costner Weaver Motorsports	Chevrolet	112	0	Running	19
26	20	71	Nick Joanides	Jan's Towing Racing	Ford	112	0	Running	18
27	14	73	Andy Jankowiak	KLAS Motorsports	Toyota	111	0	Running	17
28	37	12	Ryan Roulette	Fast Track Racing	Ford	105	0	Running	16
29	33	99	Michael Maples (R)	Fast Track Racing	Chevrolet	105	0	Running	15
30	39	03	Alex Clubb	Clubb Racing Inc.	Ford	62	0	Pump Belt	14
31	13	88	Jake Bollman	Naake-Klauer Motorsports	Ford	58	0	Accident	13
32	34	05	David Smith	Shockwave Motorsports	Toyota	54	0	Accident	12
33	25	41	Johnny Borneman III	Lowden Jackson Motorsports	Ford	52	0	Mechanical	11
34	31	63	John Aramendia	Spraker Racing Enterprises	Chevrolet	34	0	Overheating	10
35	28	24	Joe Farré	Sigma Performance Services	Chevrolet	32	0	Electrical	9
36	38	27	Bobby Hillis Jr.	Fierce Creature Racing	Chevrolet	24	0	Brakes	8
37	35	10	Brayton Laster	Fast Track Racing	Ford	17	0	Electrical	7
38	32	11	Brad Perez	Fast Track Racing	Ford	14	0	Overheating	6
39	36	77	Cody Kiemele	Performance P-1 Motorsports	Toyota	0	0	Accident	5
40	40	07	Danica Dart (R)	Kennealy Keller Motorsports	Chevrolet	0	0	Accident	4
Official race results

== Standings after the race ==
Drivers' Championship standings (ARCA Main)

	Pos	Driver	Points
2	1	Greg Van Alst	73
2	2	Christian Rose	68 (-5)
9	3	Andrés Pérez de Lara	68 (–5)
5	4	Amber Balcaen	64 (–9)
10	5	Lavar Scott	63 (–10)
5	6	Andy Jankowiak	51 (–22)
1	7	Alex Clubb	50 (–23)
	8	William Sawalich	48 (–25)
8	9	Gus Dean	47 (–26)
8	10	Isaac Johnson	46 (–27)

Drivers' Championship standings (ARCA West)

Pos	Driver	Points
1	William Sawalich	48
2	Gio Ruggiero	43 (-5)
3	Grant Enfinger	41 (–7)
4	Connor Mosack	40 (–8)
5	Sean Hingorani	39 (–9)
6	Isabella Robusto	38 (–10)
7	Jack Wood	37 (–11)
8	Andrés Pérez de Lara	36 (–12)
9	Toni Breidinger	35 (–13)
10	Lavar Scott	34 (–14)

- Note: Only the first 10 positions are included for the driver standings.

Previous race: 2024 Hard Rock Bet 200	ARCA Menards Series; 2024 season	Next race: 2024 General Tire 200 (Talladega)

Previous race: 2023 Desert Diamond Casino West Valley 100	ARCA Menards Series West; 2024 season	Next race: 2024 MMI Oil Workers 150
