= 2024 NAPA Auto Parts 150 (Irwindale) =

5th race of the 2024 ARCA Menards Series West

2024 NAPA Auto Parts 150 presented by the West Coast Stock Car Hall of Fame
Race details
- Race 5 of 12 in the 2024 ARCA Menards Series West season
- Date: July 4, 2024
- Location: Irwindale Speedway in Irwindale, California
- Course: Permanent racing facility
- Course length: 0.50 miles (0.80 km)
- Distance: 150 laps, 75 mi (120 km)
- Scheduled distance: 150 laps, 75 mi (120 km)
- Average speed: 80.285 miles per hour (129.206 km/h)

Pole position
Driver	Tyler Reif	Central Coast Racing
- Time: 18.372

Most laps led
Driver	Sean Hingorani	Venturini Motorsports
- Laps: 150

Winner
No. 15	Sean Hingorani	Venturini Motorsports

Television in the United States
- Network: FloRacing
- Announcers: Charles Krall

Radio in the United States
- Radio: ARCA Racing Network

The 2024 NAPA Auto Parts 150 presented by the West Coast Stock Car Motorsports Hall of Fame was the 5th stock car race of the 2024 ARCA Menards Series West season, and the 23rd iteration of the event. The race was held on Thursday, July 4, 2024, at Irwindale Speedway in Irwindale, California, a 0.50 mile (0.80 km) permanent asphalt oval shaped short track. The race contested the over 150 laps to complete. Sean Hingorani, driving for Venturini Motorsports, would dominate the race, leading all 150 laps. To fill out the podium, Isabella Robusto, driving for Venturini Motorsports, and Jake Finch, driving for Venturini Motorsports, would finish 2nd and 3rd, place respectively.

== Report ==
=== Background ===
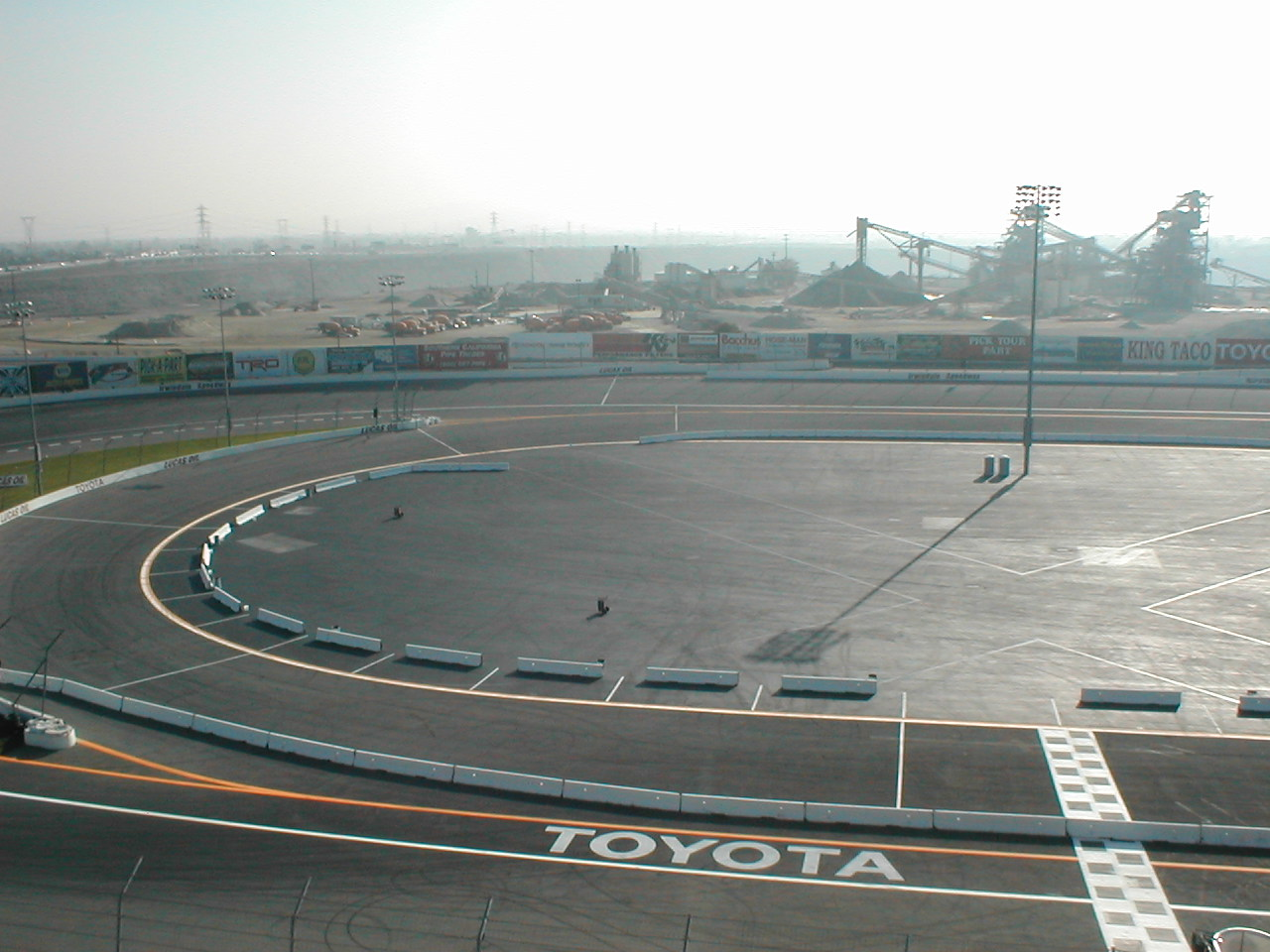
Irwindale Speedway, the circuit where the race was held.

The Irwindale Speedway & Event Center (a.k.a. Irwindale Speedway, Irwindale Dragstrip, or "The House of Drift") is a motorsports facility located in Irwindale, California, United States. It opened on March 27, 1999, under the official name Irwindale Speedway. Toyota purchased the naming rights to the facility in 2008, and from that time until 2011 it was also known as the Toyota Speedway at Irwindale.

The speedway features banked, paved 1/2- and 1/3-mile oval tracks and a 1/8-mile drag strip. The property is primarily used for NASCAR races such as ARCA Menards Series West and Whelen All-American Series events. In late 2011, NASCAR announced it was dropping Toyota Speedway from its schedule. The company that managed the track, Irwindale Speedway LLC, filed Chapter 7 bankruptcy on February 13, 2012.

==== Entry list ====
- (R) denotes rookie driver.

#	Driver	Team	Make	Sponsor
0	Tony Huffman	Fierce Creature Racing	Chevrolet	Camping World / First Impression Press
1	Robbie Kennealy (R)	Kennealy Keller Motorsports	Ford	Setting The Stage / Wiley X
3	Todd Souza	Central Coast Racing	Toyota	Central Coast Cabinets
05	David Smith	Shockwave Motorsports	Toyota	Shockwave Marine Suspension Seating
5	Kole Raz	Jerry Pitts Racing	Toyota	Apache Rental Group
7	Takuma Koga	Jerry Pitts Racing	Toyota	Yamada / CKB
9	Michael Killen	Jan's Towing Racing	Ford	Jan's Towing
12	Kyle Keller	Kennealy Keller Motorsports	Ford	Setting The Stage / Battle Born
13	Tyler Reif	Central Coast Racing	Toyota	Central Coast Cabinets
15	Sean Hingorani	Venturini Motorsports	Toyota	Fidelity Capital
16	Jack Wood	Bill McAnally Racing	Chevrolet	NAPA Auto Care
19	Eric Johnson Jr. (R)	Bill McAnally Racing	Chevrolet	Pacific Office Automation
20	Jake Finch	Venturini Motorsports	Toyota	Phoenix Construction
23	Jaron Giannini	Sigma Performance Services	Chevrolet	Versatile / SPS / GMS Fabrication
27	Bobby Hillis Jr.	Fierce Creature Racing	Chevrolet	Camping World / First Impression Press
31	Rick Goodale	Rise Motorsports	Chevrolet	Nor-Cal Battery Company
50	Trevor Huddleston	High Point Racing	Ford	High Point Racing / Racecar Factory
55	Isabella Robusto	Venturini Motorsports	Toyota	Yahoo!
71	Nick Joanides	Jan's Towing Racing	Ford	Jan's Towing
77	Garrett Zacharias	Performance P–1 Motorsports	Toyota	King Taco / REX MD / Wallace Sign
Official entry list

== Practice ==
The first and only practice session was held on Thursday, July 4, at 3:30 PM PST, and lasted for 1 hour. Trevor Huddleston, driving for, High Point Racing, would set the fastest time in the session, with a lap of 18.718, and a speed of 96.164 mph (154.761 km/h).

=== Practice results ===
Pos.	#	Driver	Team	Make	Time	Speed
1	50	Trevor Huddleston	High Point Racing	Ford	18.718	96.164
2	16	Jack Wood	Bill McAnally Racing	Chevrolet	18.836	95.562
3	71	Nick Joanides	Jan's Towing Racing	Ford	18.836	95.562
Full practice results

== Qualifying ==
Qualifying was held on Thursday, July 4, at 5:00 PM PST. The qualifying system used is a multi-car, multi-lap based system. All drivers will be on track for a 20-minute timed session, and whoever sets the fastest time in the session will win the pole.

Tyler Reif, driving for Central Coast Racing, would score the pole for the race, with a lap of 18.372 and a speed of 97.975 mph (157.675 km/h).

=== Qualifying results ===
Pos.	#	Driver	Team	Make	Time	Speed
1	13	Tyler Reif	Central Coast Racing	Toyota	18.372	97.975
2	15	Sean Hingorani	Venturini Motorsports	Toyota	18.447	97.577
3	50	Trevor Huddleston	High Point Racing	Ford	18.456	97.529
4	16	Jack Wood	Bill McAnally Racing	Chevrolet	18.478	97.413
5	12	Kyle Keller	Kennealy Keller Motorsports	Ford	18.543	97.072
6	5	Kole Raz	Jerry Pitts Racing	Toyota	18.615	96.696
7	20	Jake Finch	Venturini Motorsports	Toyota	18.645	96.541
8	55	Isabella Robusto	Venturini Motorsports	Toyota	18.711	96.200
9	19	Eric Johnson Jr.(R)	Bill McAnally Racing	Chevrolet	18.796	95.765
10	71	Nick Joanides	Jan's Towing Racing	Ford	18.833	95.577
11	3	Todd Souza	Central Coast Racing	Toyota	18.867	95.405
12	7	Takuma Koga	Jerry Pitts Racing	Toyota	18.963	94.922
13	23	Jaron Giannini	Sigma Performance Services	Chevrolet	18.986	94.807
14	77	Garrett Zacharias	Performance P–1 Motorsports	Toyota	19.205	93.726
15	05	David Smith	Shockwave Motorsports	Toyota	19.689	91.422
16	9	Michael Killen	Jan's Towing Racing	Ford	20.563	87.536
17	27	Bobby Hillis Jr.	Fierce Creature Racing	Chevrolet	20.922	86.034
18	1	Robbie Kennealy (R)	Kennealy Keller Motorsports	Ford		
19	31	Rick Goodale	Rise Motorsports	Chevrolet		
Official qualifying results

== Race results ==
Fin	St	#	Driver	Team	Make	Laps	Led	Status	Pts
1	2	15	Sean Hingorani	Venturini Motorsports	Toyota	150	150	Running	98
2	8	55	Isabella Robusto	Venturini Motorsports	Toyota	150	0	Running	42
3	7	20	Jake Finch	Venturini Motorsports	Toyota	150	0	Running	41
4	3	50	Trevor Huddleston	High Point Racing	Ford	150	0	Running	90
5	1	13	Tyler Reif	Central Coast Racing	Toyota	150	0	Running	90
6	13	23	Jaron Giannini	Sigma Performance Services	Chevrolet	150	0	Running	38
7	10	71	Nick Joanides	Jan's Towing Racing	Ford	149	0	Running	87
8	5	12	Kyle Keller	Kennealy Keller Motorsports	Ford	148	0	Running	86
9	12	7	Takuma Koga	Jerry Pitts Racing	Toyota	147	0	Running	85
10	11	3	Todd Souza	Central Coast Racing	Toyota	147	0	Running	84
11	9	19	Eric Johnson Jr (R)	Bill McAnally Racing	Chevrolet	147	0	Running	83
12	14	77	Garrett Zacharias	Performance P–1 Motorsports	Toyota	147	0	Running	32
13	16	9	Michael Killen	Jan's Towing Racing	Ford	144	0	Running	31
14	4	16	Jack Wood	Bill McAnally Racing	Chevrolet	142	0	Running	80
15	15	05	David Smith	Shockwave Motorsports	Toyota	141	0	Running	79
16	17	27	Bobby Hillis Jr.	Fierce Creature Racing	Chevrolet	111	0	Handling	78
17	6	5	Kole Raz	Jerry Pitts Racing	Toyota	58	0	Rear End	27
18	18	1	Robbie Kennealy	Kennealy Keller Motorsports	Ford	0	0	DNS	76
19	19	31	Rick Goodale	Rise Motorsports	Chevrolet	0	0	DNS	25

== Standings after the race ==
Drivers' Championship standings

	Pos	Driver	Points
	1	Tyler Reif	248
	2	Sean Hingorani	246 (-2)
3	3	Trevor Huddleston	222 (–26)
1	4	Jack Wood	222 (–26)
	5	Kyle Keller	220 (–28)
1	6	Eric Johnson Jr.	203 (–45)
2	7	Takuma Koga	200 (–48)
2	8	Nick Joanides	199 (–49)
4	9	Todd Souza	181 (–67)
2	10	Robbie Kennealy	177 (–71)

- Note: Only the first 10 positions are included for the driver standings.

Previous race: 2024 General Tire 200	ARCA Menards Series West; 2024 season	Next race: West Coast Stock Car Motorsports Hall of Fame 150
