= High Point Racing =

American auto racing team

- Owner(s): Tim Huddleston; Trevor Huddleston
- Base: Agoura Hills, California
- Series: ARCA Menards Series; ARCA Menards Series West
- Race drivers: ARCA Menards Series: 50. Trevor Huddleston (part-time); 56. Andrew Chapman (part-time); ARCA Menards Series West: 50. Trevor Huddleston; 55. Andrew Chapman, Tanner Huddleston; 56. Andrew Chapman (part-time)
- Manufacturer: Ford
- Opened: 2021

Career
- Debut: ARCA Menards Series: 2021 General Tire 150 (Phoenix); ARCA Menards Series West: 2021 General Tire 150 (Phoenix)
- Latest race: ARCA Menards Series West: 2026 General Tire 150 (Phoenix); ARCA Menards Series West: 2026 NAPA Auto Parts 150 (Bakersfield)
- Races competed: Total: 66; ARCA Menards Series: 4 ARCA Menards Series West: 62
- Drivers' Championships: Total: 2 ARCA Menards Series: 0 ARCA Menards Series West: 2
- Race victories: Total: 9 ARCA Menards Series: 0 ARCA Menards Series West: 9
- Pole positions: Total: 7 ARCA Menards Series: 0 ARCA Menards Series West: 7

High Point Racing is an American stock car racing team that competes in the ARCA Menards Series West. The team was founded in 2021 and currently fields the No. 50 Ford full-time for Trevor Huddleston and the No. 55 full-time for Andrew Chapman and Tanner Huddleston.

== ARCA Menards Series ==
=== Car No. 50 results ===
Year	Driver	No.	Make	1	2	3	4	5	6	7	8	9	10	11	12	13	14	15	16	17	18	19	20	AMSC	Pts
2023	Trevor Huddleston	50	Ford	DAY	PHO; 10	TAL	KAN	CLT	BLN	ELK	MOH	IOW	POC	MCH	IRP	GLN	ISF	MLW	DSF	KAN	BRI	SLM	TOL	82nd	35
2024	Trevor Huddleston	50	Ford	DAY	PHO; 17	TAL	DOV	KAN	CLT	IOW	MOH	BLN	IRP	SLM	ELK	MCH	ISF	MLW	DSF	GLN	BRI	KAN	TOL	92nd	27
2025	Trevor Huddleston	50	Ford	DAY	PHO; 12	TAL	KAN	CLT	MCH	BLN	ELK	LRP	DOV	IRP	IOW	GLN	ISF	MAD	DSF	BRI	SLM	KAN	TOL	104th	32
2026	Trevor Huddleston	50	Ford	DAY	PHO; 4	KAN	TAL	GLN	TOL	MCH	POC	BER	ELK	CHI	LRP	IRP	IOW	ISF	MAD	DSF	SLM	BRI	KAN	80th	40

=== Car No. 51 results ===
Year	Team	No.	Make	1	2	3	4	5	6	7	8	9	10	11	12	13	14	15	16	17	18	19	20	AMSC	Pts
2021	Dean Thompson	51	Ford	DAY	PHO; 15	TAL	KAN	TOL	CLT	MOH	POC	ELK	BLN	IOW	WIN	GLN	MCH	ISF	MLW	DSF	BRI	SLM	KAN		

=== Car No. 56 results ===
Year	Driver	No.	Make	1	2	3	4	5	6	7	8	9	10	11	12	13	14	15	16	17	18	19	20	AMSC	Pts
2026	Andrew Chapman	56	Ford	DAY	PHO; 15	KAN	TAL	GLN	TOL	MCH	POC	BER	ELK	CHI	LRP	IRP	IOW	ISF	MAD	DSF	SLM	BRI	KAN	107th	29

== ARCA Menards Series West ==
=== Car No. 50 history ===
In 2022, Trevor Huddleston joined his family-owned team High Point Racing in the No. 50 Ford for the first Irwindale race, where he finished sixth. He would also run Kern County and the second Irwindale race, finishing seventh and third respectively.

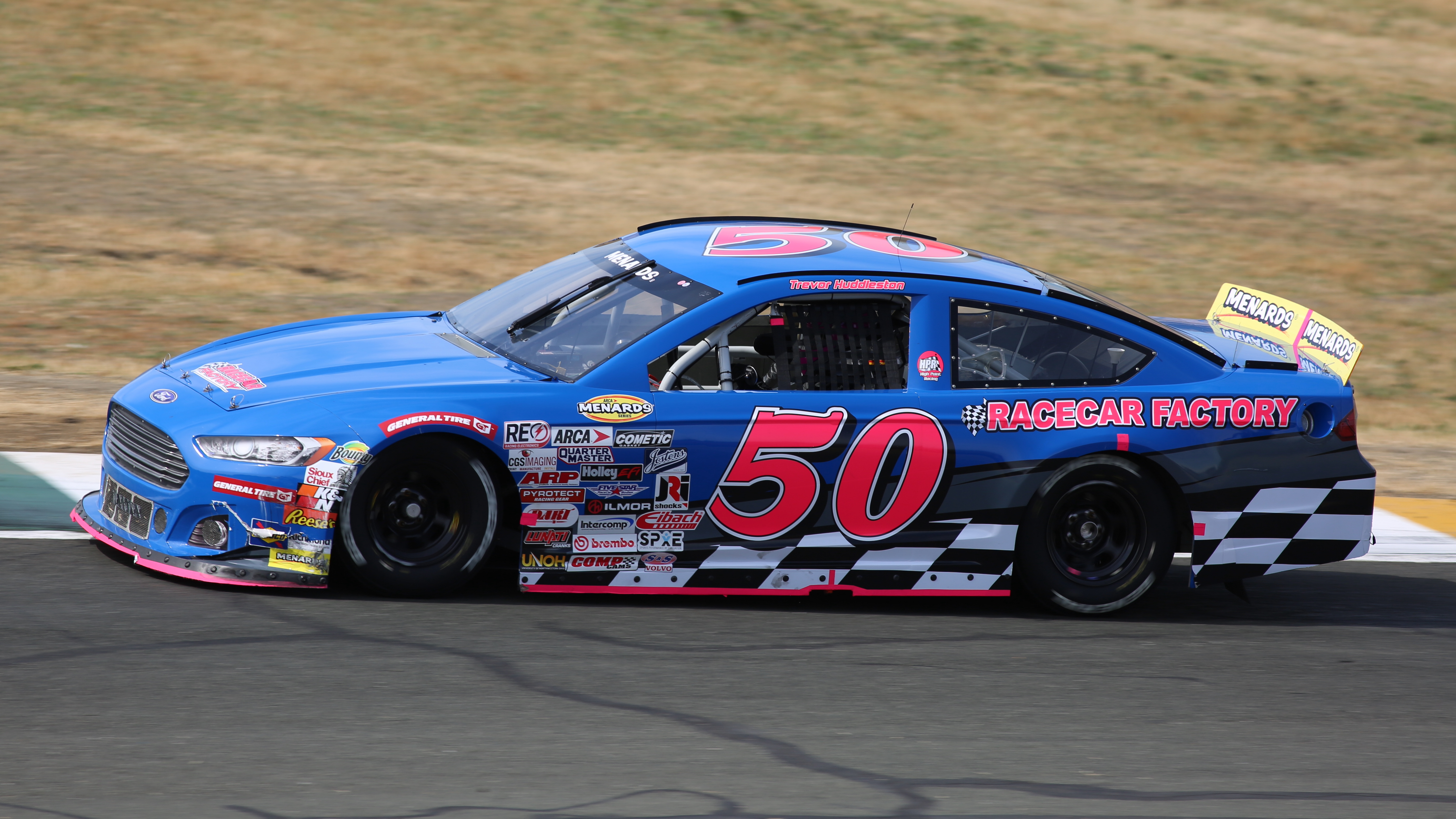
Huddleston's No. 50 ARCA car at Sonoma in 2023

In 2023, Huddleston drove the High Point Racing No. 50 full time. He would win a race at his home track of Irwindale. Huddleston finished a career high third in the points standings.

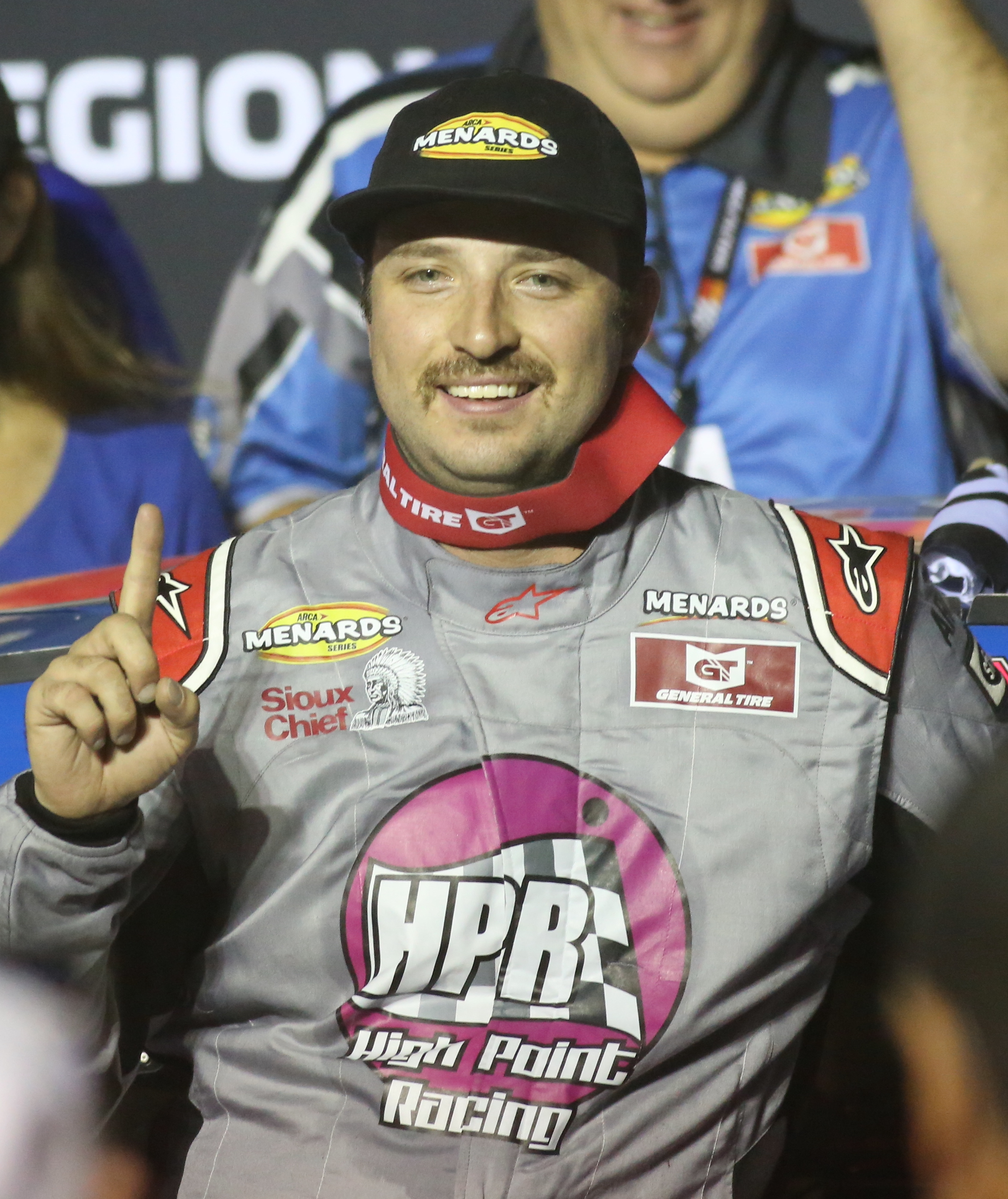
Huddleston celebrating his victory at Madera Speedway in 2025

Huddleston returned to the No. 50 in 2024. He would win back to back races at Madera Speedway and All American Speedway. For the second season in a row, he would finish third in the points standings.

For 2025, Huddleston got to a hot-start, winning the first race at Kern, then later winning at Kern again, followed by winning back-to-back races at Madera Speedway and The Bullring at Las Vegas Motor Speedway. At the season's end, he would be the series champion.

In 2026, Huddleston started slowly, earning wins at Shasta and Colorado. He scored enough points to be the series champion for the second straight year.

==== Car No. 50 results ====
Year	Driver	No.	Make	1	2	3	4	5	6	7	8	9	10	11	12	13	AMSWC	Pts
2022	Trevor Huddleston	50	Ford	PHO	IRW; 6	KCR; 7	PIR	SON	IRW; 3	EVG; 8	PIR	AAS	LVS	PHO			23rd	152
2023	Trevor Huddleston	50	Ford	PHO; 9	IRW; 4	KCR; 3	PIR; 12	SON; 28	IRW; 1*	SHA; 2*	EVG; 6	AAS; 15	LVS; 2	MAD; 10	PHO; 20		4th	578
2024	Trevor Huddleston	50	Ford	PHO; 17	KER; 2	PIR; 8	SON; 18	IRW; 4	IRW; 9*	SHA; 3	TRI; 7	MAD; 1*	AAS; 1**	KER; 3	PHO; 13		2nd	606
2025	Trevor Huddleston	50	Ford	KER; 1*	PHO; 12	TUC; 5*	CNS; 3	KER; 1*	SON; 4	TRI; 5	PIR; 5	AAS; 2	MAD; 1**	LVS; 1*	PHO; 10		1st	650
2026	Trevor Huddleston	50	Ford	KER; 4	PHO; 4	TUC; 2	SHA; 1*	CNS; 1*	TRI; 2	SON; 9	PIR; 13	AAS; 2*	MAD; 2*	LVS; 5*	PHO; 7	KER; 5	1st	685

=== Car No. 51 history ===
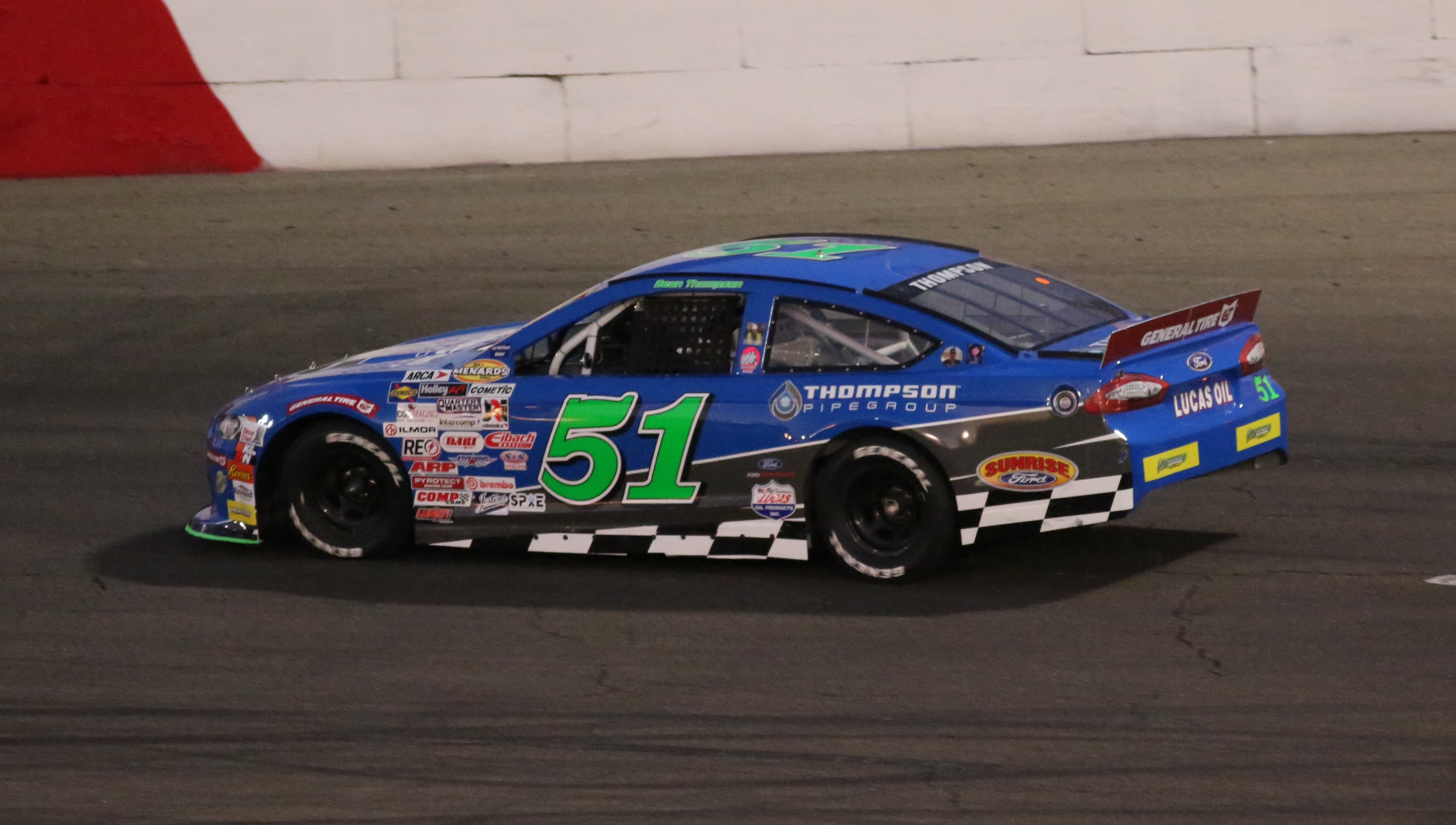
Thompson's car at All American Speedway in 2021

In 2021, Dean Thompson moved up to the ARCA Menards Series West, driving the No. 51 full-time for HPR, the team he drove for in the Spears Southwest Tour in 2020. HPR also formed an alliance with Sunrise Ford Racing to help their team, as it was their first time fielding a car in the West Series. The day before the second race at Irwindale, Thompson tested positive for COVID-19 and was replaced by Ryan Partridge for that race. Partridge, a former Sunrise Ford Racing driver, made his first start in the series since 2018. Thompson's best finish was second at Irwindale Speedway, winning the pole and leading most of the race, only to get passed after a late restart. He finished the year with two poles, one top-five, and two top-ten finishes.

==== Car No. 51 results ====
Year	Team	No.	Make	1	2	3	4	5	6	7	8	9	AMSWC	Pts
2021	Dean Thompson	51	Ford	PHO; 15	SON; 6	IRW; 2*	CNS; 11			LVS; 14	AAS; 17	PHO; 22		
2021	Ryan Partridge	51	Ford					IRW; 5	PIR					

=== Car No. 55 history ===
In 2023, it was announced that Jake Bollman would run a partial schedule for High Point Racing in the ARCA Menards Series West, driving the No. 55 Ford, beginning at the first Irwindale Speedway event, where he would finish twelfth due to being involved in a crash midway through the race. Bollman was originally scheduled to compete in the race at All American Speedway, but was replaced by Rodd Kneeland, who was credited with an 18th place DNF. Cole Custer also drove in the No. 55, driving at Portland and Sonoma. He finished second and 18th respectively.

Chapman's No. 55 car at Madera Speedway in 2025

In 2025, Andrew Chapman made his debut in the ARCA Menards Series West in the No. 55. He started in 12th and finished in sixth place. He later returned with the team at All American Speedway later that year, where he finished in third place. He then ran the final three races of the year, getting two more top-ten finishes at Madera Speedway and the Las Vegas Motor Speedway Bullring, and finished tenth in points despite running only five races.

In 2026, Chapman ran almost a full schedule for HPR, once again in the No. 55. He missed that season ending race at Kevin Harvick's Kern Raceway after not being given medical clearance to compete due to a crash in the previous race at Phoenix Raceway and was replaced by Tanner Huddleston.

==== Car No. 55 results ====
Year	Driver	No.	Make	1	2	3	4	5	6	7	8	9	10	11	12	13	AMSWC	Pts
2023	Jake Bollman	55	Ford	PHO	IRW; 12	KCR; 7			IRW; 7	SHA	EVG						17th	202
2023	Cole Custer (Note: Entries were fielded in a collaboration with Stewart-Haas Racing.)	55	Ford				PIR; 2*	SON; 18									17th	202
2023	Rodd Kneeland	55	Ford									AAS; 18	LVS	MAD	PHO		17th	202
2025	Andrew Chapman	55	Ford	KER	PHO	TUC	CNS	KER; 6	SON	TRI	PIR	AAS; 3	MAD; 7	LVS; 6	PHO; 21		14th	227
2026	Andrew Chapman	55	Ford	KER; 16	PHO	TUC; 11	SHA; 4	CNS; 10	TRI; 8	SON; 14	PIR; 9	AAS; 8	MAD; 9	LVS; 10	PHO; 24		8th	576
2026	Tanner Huddleston	55	Ford													KER; 8	8th	576

==== Car No. 56 results ====
Year	Driver	No.	Make	1	2	3	4	5	6	7	8	9	10	11	12	13	AMSWC	Pts
2026	Andrew Chapman	56	Ford	KER	PHO; 15	TUC	SHA	CNS	TRI	SON	PIR	AAS	MAD	LVS	PHO	KER		
