= David Smith (racing driver) =

Canadian racing driver (born 1950)

- Smith at All American Speedway in 2026
- Born: March 28, 1950 (age 76); Sidney, British Columbia, Canada

ARCA Menards Series career
- 4 races run over 4 years
- ARCA no., team: No. 05 (Shockwave Motorsports)
- Best finish: 100th (2023)
- First race: 2023 General Tire 150 (Phoenix)
- Last race: 2026 General Tire 150 (Phoenix)
| Wins | Top tens | Poles |
|---|---|---|
| 0 | 0 | 0 |

ARCA Menards Series West career
- 52 races run over 5 years
- ARCA West no., team: No. 05 (Shockwave Motorsports)
- Best finish: 7th (2025)
- First race: 2022 NAPA Auto Parts ARCA West 150 (Evergreen)
- Last race: 2026 NAPA Auto Parts 150 (Bakersfield)
| Wins | Top tens | Poles |
|---|---|---|
| 0 | 3 | 0 |
- Statistics up to date as of November 1, 2026.

David Smith (born March 28, 1950) is a Canadian professional stock car racing driver who currently competes full-time in the ARCA Menards Series West, driving the No. 05 Toyota for Shockwave Motorsports.

== Racing career ==
Smith would work in NASCAR in the 1970s as a chassis builder for multiple teams and owners like Ralph Moody, Gary Kershaw, Roy Smith, and Hershel McGriff, a job he would retain for a further twenty years.

In 2011, Smith was inducted into the Victoria Auto Racing Hall of Fame.

From 2017 to 2019, Smith would compete in various Trans-Am West Coast Championship events, finishing third in the standings in 2018 after running five of the six events on the schedule that year.

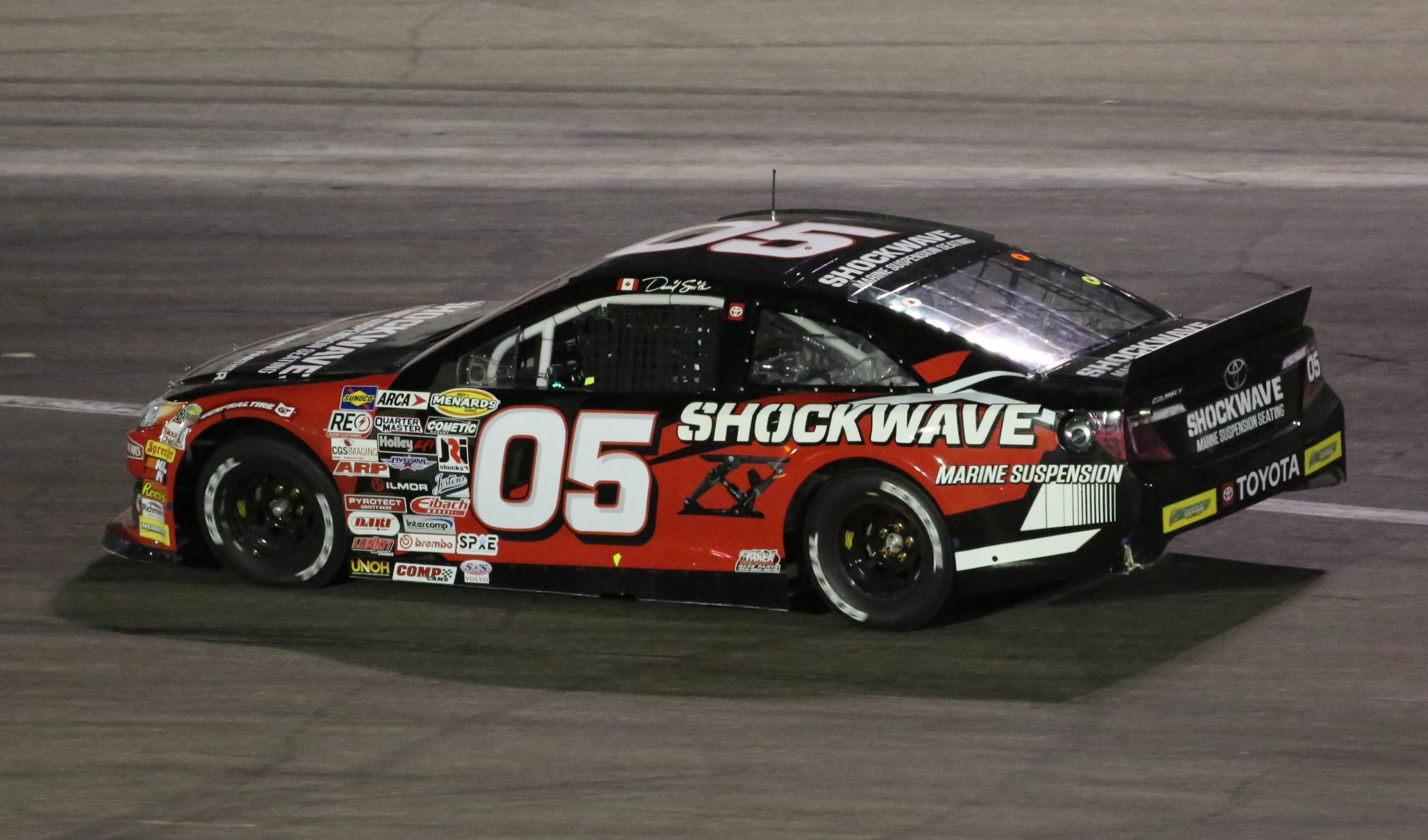
Smith's No. 05 car at All American Speedway in 2022

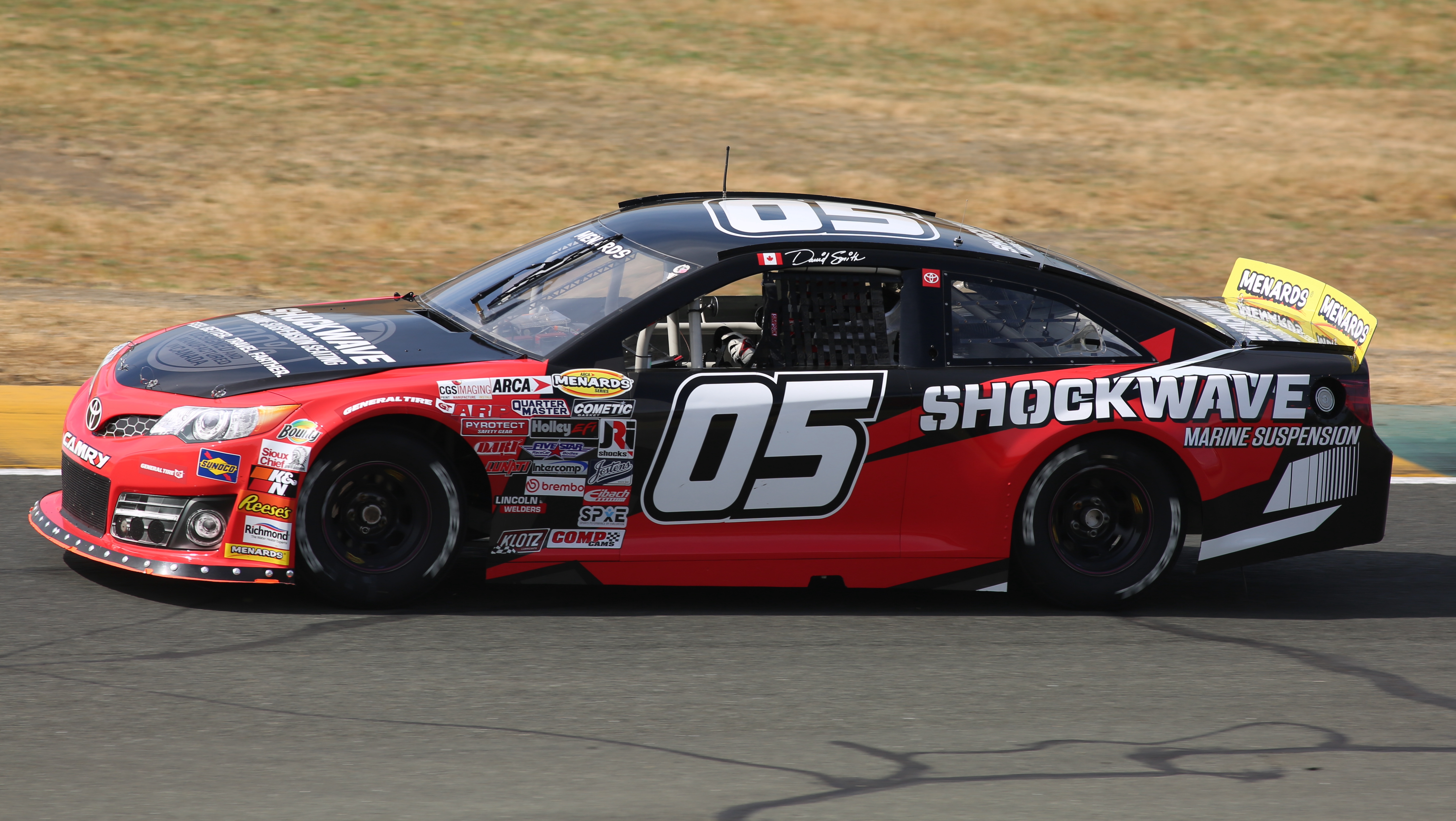
Smith's No. 05 ARCA car at Sonoma in 2023.

In 2022, Smith would make his ARCA Menards Series West debut at Evergreen Speedway driving the No. 05 Toyota for Shockwave Motorsports, finishing thirteenth due to a crash with less than thirty laps to go. He would make two more starts during the year at All American Speedway and Phoenix Raceway, and would get a best finish of eleventh at the Roseville event.

In 2023, Smith would attempt to run the full ARCA Menards Series West schedule for Shockwave after forming an alliance with Naake-Klauer Motorsports despite Smith's team running Toyotas while Naake-Klauer runs Fords.

In the 2026 Tucson ARCA Menards West 150, Smith would lead his first laps in his ARCA Menards West career, leading 19 laps.

== Personal life ==
In 2020, Smith was diagnosed with prostate cancer but was able to get treatment for it in the United States.

Smith is the president of SHOCKWAVE Marine Suspension Seats, and has served as Smith's sponsor whenever he races. The company has also sponsored Derek Kraus in the NASCAR Craftsman Truck Series.

== Motorsports career results ==
=== Stock car career summary ===
| Season | Series | Team | Races | Wins | Top 5 | Top 10 | Points | Position |
|---|---|---|---|---|---|---|---|---|
| 2022 | ARCA Menards Series West | Shockwave Motorsports | 4 | 0 | 0 | 0 | 180 | 20th |
| 2023 | ARCA Menards Series West | Shockwave Motorsports | 12 | 0 | 0 | 1 | 509 | 10th |
| 2023 | ARCA Menards Series | Shockwave Motorsports | 1 | 0 | 0 | 0 | 27 | 100th |
| 2024 | ARCA Menards Series West | Shockwave Motorsports | 12 | 0 | 0 | 1 | 476 | 8th |
| 2024 | ARCA Menards Series | Shockwave Motorsports | 1 | 0 | 0 | 0 | 12 | 113th |
| 2025 | ARCA Menards Series West | Shockwave Motorsports | 12 | 0 | 0 | 1 | 495 | 7th |
| 2025 | ARCA Menards Series | Shockwave Motorsports | 1 | 0 | 0 | 0 | 15 | 136th |
| 2026 | ARCA Menards Series West | Shockwave Motorsports | 13 | 0 | 0 | 0 | 489 | 10th |
| 2026 | ARCA Menards Series | Shockwave Motorsports | 1 | 0 | 0 | 0 | 18 | 124th |

=== ARCA Menards Series ===
(key) (Bold – Pole position awarded by qualifying time. Italics – Pole position earned by points standings or practice time. * – Most laps led. ** – All laps led.)

ARCA Menards Series results
| Year | Team | No. | Make | 1 | 2 | 3 | 4 | 5 | 6 | 7 | 8 | 9 | 10 | 11 | 12 | 13 | 14 | 15 | 16 | 17 | 18 | 19 | 20 | AMSC | Pts | Ref |
|---|---|---|---|---|---|---|---|---|---|---|---|---|---|---|---|---|---|---|---|---|---|---|---|---|---|---|
| 2023 | Shockwave Motorsports | 05 | Toyota | DAY | PHO; 17 | TAL | KAN | CLT | BLN | ELK | MOH | IOW | POC | MCH | IRP | GLN | ISF | MLW | DSF | KAN | BRI | SLM | TOL | 100th | 27 | |
| 2024 | Shockwave Motorsports | 05 | Toyota | DAY | PHO; 32 | TAL | DOV | KAN | CLT | IOW | MOH | BLN | IRP | SLM | ELK | MCH | ISF | MLW | DSF | GLN | BRI | KAN | TOL | 113th | 12 | |
| 2025 | Shockwave Motorsports | 05 | Toyota | DAY | PHO; 29 | TAL | KAN | CLT | MCH | BLN | ELK | LRP | DOV | IRP | IOW | GLN | ISF | MAD | DSF | BRI | SLM | KAN | TOL | 136th | 15 | |
| 2026 | Shockwave Motorsports | 05 | Toyota | DAY | PHO; 26 | KAN | TAL | GLN | TOL | MCH | POC | BER | ELK | CHI | LRP | IRP | IOW | ISF | MAD | DSF | SLM | BRI | KAN | 124th | 18 | |

==== ARCA Menards Series West ====
ARCA Menards Series West results
| Year | Team | No. | Make | 1 | 2 | 3 | 4 | 5 | 6 | 7 | 8 | 9 | 10 | 11 | 12 | 13 | AMSWC | Pts | Ref |
|---|---|---|---|---|---|---|---|---|---|---|---|---|---|---|---|---|---|---|---|
| 2022 | Shockwave Motorsports | 05 | Toyota | PHO | IRW | KCR | PIR | SON | IRW | EVG; 13 | PIR | AAS; 11 | LVS; 19 | PHO; 20 | | | 20th | 180 | |
| 2023 | Shockwave Motorsports | 05 | Toyota | PHO; 17 | IRW; 10 | KCR; 13 | PIR; 13 | SON; 15 | IRW; 11 | SHA; 15 | EVG; 13 | AAS; 12 | LVS; 14 | MAD; 13 | PHO; 23 | | 10th | 509 | |
| 2024 | Shockwave Motorsports | 05 | Toyota | PHO; 32 | KER; 16 | PIR; 17 | SON; 20 | IRW; 15 | IRW; 15 | SHA; 10 | TRI; 15 | MAD; 13 | AAS; 15 | KER; 16 | PHO; 18 | | 8th | 476 | |
| 2025 | Shockwave Motorsports | 05 | Toyota | KER; 10 | PHO; 29 | TUC; 12 | CNS; 11 | KER; 11 | SON; 20 | TRI; 11 | PIR; 15 | AAS; 12 | MAD; 12 | LVS; 15 | PHO; 25 | | 7th | 495 | |
| 2026 | Shockwave Motorsports | 05 | Toyota | KER; 18 | PHO; 26 | TUC; 15 | SHA; 12 | CNS; 16 | TRI; 12 | SON; 17 | PIR; 20 | AAS; 14 | MAD; 18 | LVS; 19 | PHO; 22 | KER; 25 | 10th | 489 | |
