= Sean Hingorani =

American racing driver (born 2006)

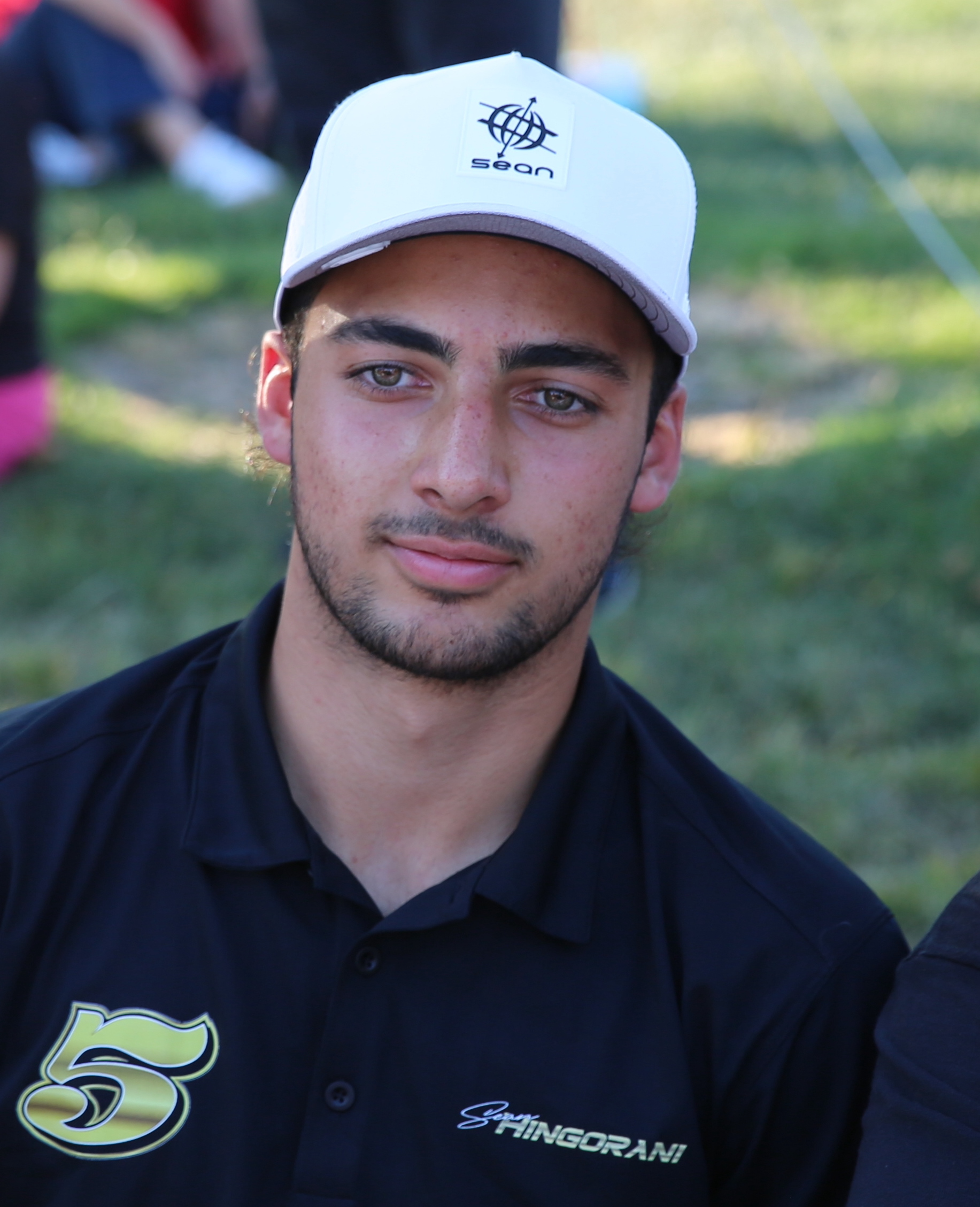
- Hingorani at All American Speedway in 2024
- Born: October 13, 2006 (age 20); Newport Beach, California, U.S.
- Achievements: 2023, 2024 ARCA Menards Series West Champion

NASCAR FedEx Freight Truck Series career
- 2 races run over 1 year
- 2023 position: 53rd
- Best finish: 53rd (2023)
- First race: 2023 Clean Harbors 175 (Milwaukee)
- Last race: 2023 Craftsman 150 (Phoenix)
Wins	Top tens	Poles
0	0	0

ARCA Menards Series career
- 12 races run over 2 years
- Best finish: 12th (2023)
- First race: 2023 General Tire 150 (Phoenix)
- Last race: 2024 Shore Lunch 250 (Elko)
Wins	Top tens	Poles
0	8	1

ARCA Menards Series East career
- 7 races run over 1 year
- Best finish: 7th (2023)
- First race: 2023 Pensacola 200 (Pensacola)
- Last race: 2023 Bush's Beans 200 (Bristol)
Wins	Top tens	Poles
0	6	1

ARCA Menards Series West career
- 31 races run over 4 years
- Best finish: 1st (2023, 2024)
- First race: 2022 NAPA Auto Parts ARCA West 150 (Evergreen)
- Last race: 2026 NAPA Auto Parts 150 (Bakersfield)
- First win: 2023 West Coast Stock Car Motorsports Hall of Fame 150 (Irwindale)
- Last win: 2024 NAPA Auto Parts 150 (Kern County)
Wins	Top tens	Poles
7	20	4
- Statistics up to date as of November 1, 2026.

Sean Hingorani (born October 13, 2006) is an American professional stock car racing driver. He last competed part-time in the ARCA Menards Series West, driving the No. 13 Toyota Camry for Central Coast Racing, and the No. 4 Chevrolet for Nascimento Motorsports. He is the 2023 and 2024 ARCA Menards Series West champion.

== Racing career ==
Hingorani raced in the Southwest for the majority of his early racing career, running Legends cars in 2021, while running the Silver State Road Course Championship, where he won the championship.

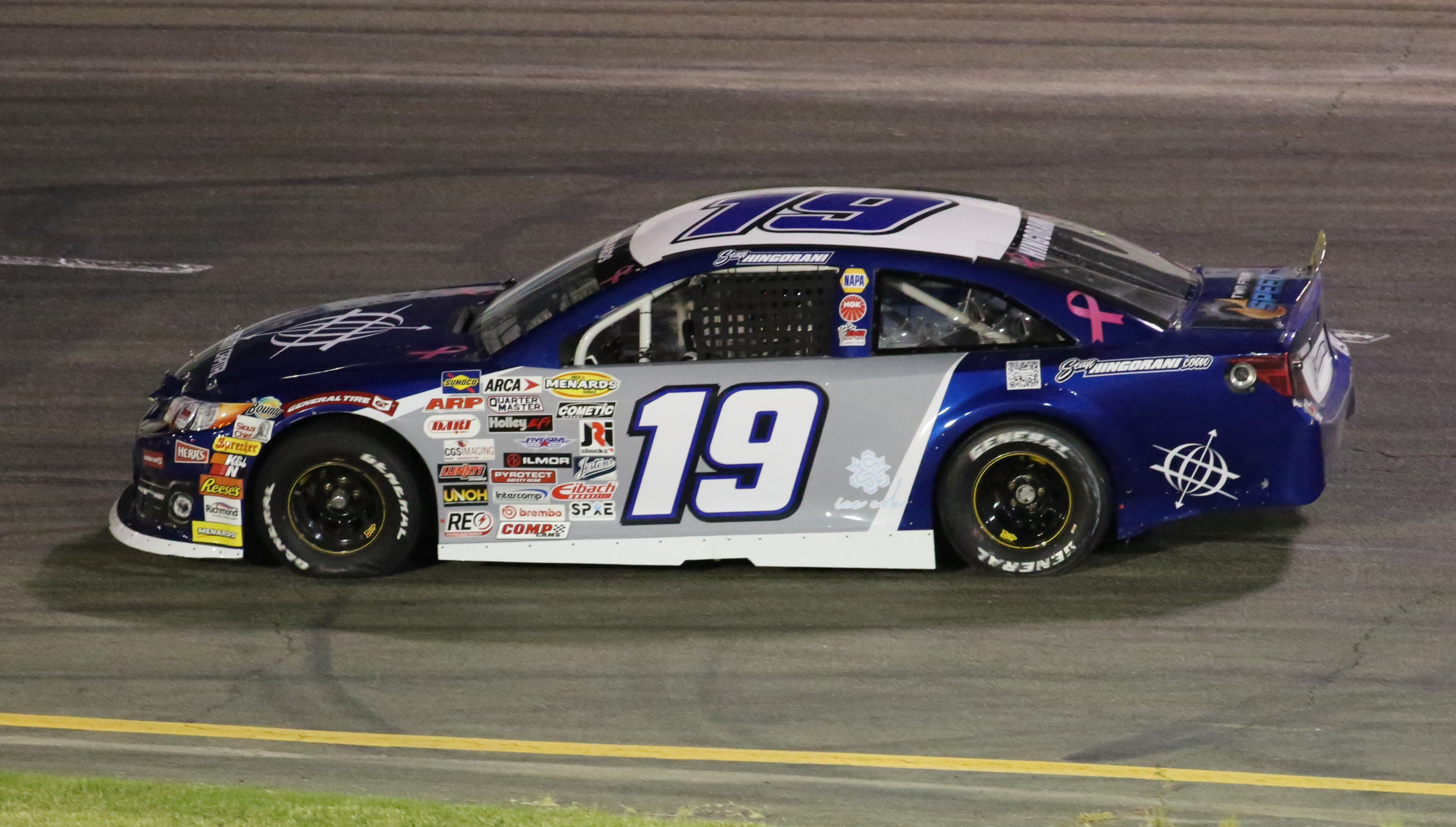
Hingorani's No. 19 car at All American Speedway in 2022

In 2022, Hingorani made his ARCA Menards Series West debut at Evergreen Speedway, driving the No. 4 Toyota for Eric Nascimento, whose team Hingorani had raced for in late-model competition. In the race, he started seventh, and finished 14th due to a crash while running in the top-five. He would make four more starts that year, qualifying in the top ten three times, and achieving a best finish of 12th at Portland International Raceway.

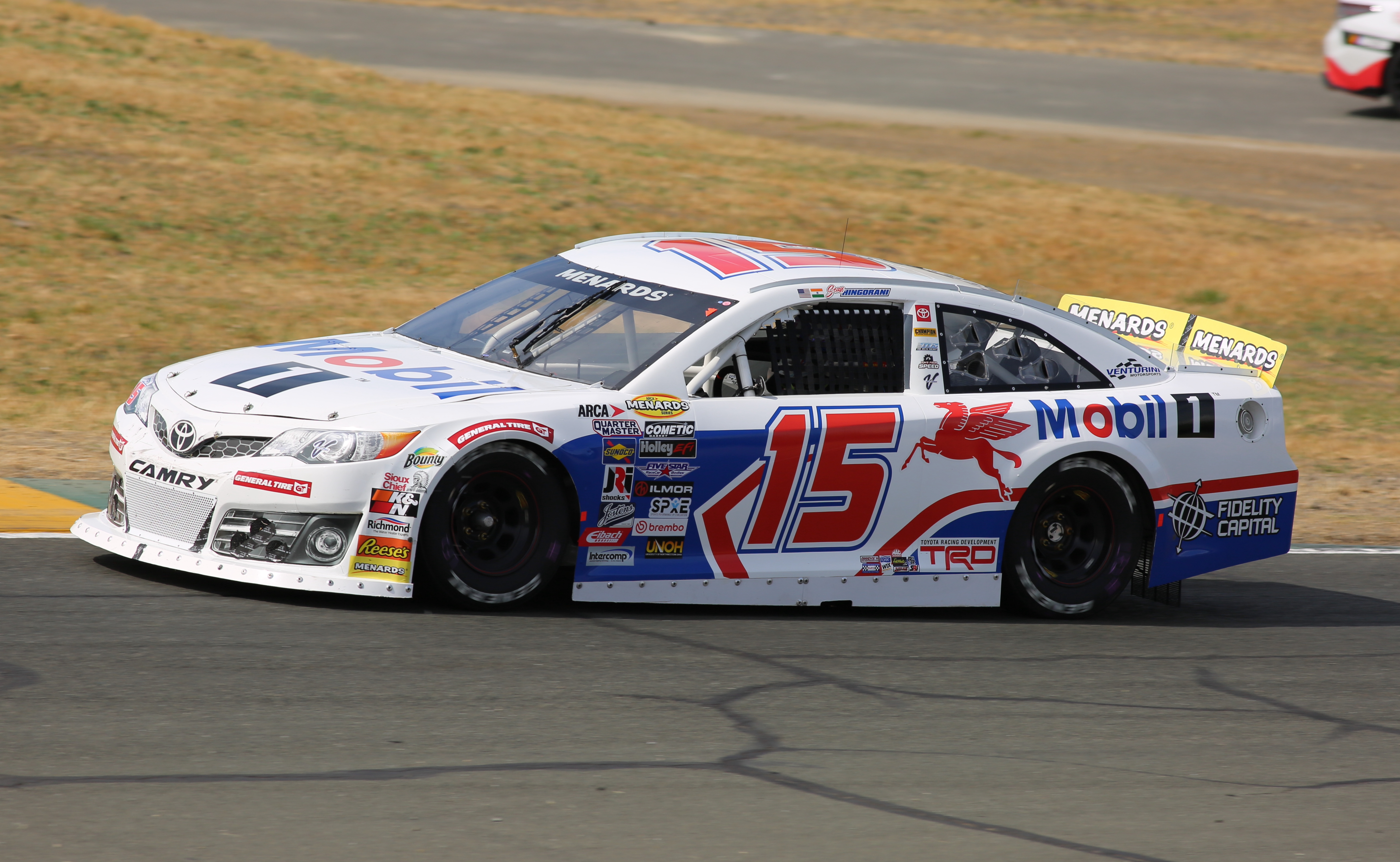
Hingorani's No. 15 ARCA car at Sonoma in 2023

On January 18, 2023, it was announced that Hingorani would run in the ARCA Menards Series East full-time for Venturini Motorsports in the No. 15 Toyota. On February 15, it was announced that Hingorani would also compete full time in the ARCA Menards Series West as well, running for both East and West championships. On July 7, Hingorani was involved in an accident near the closing laps of the Zinsser SmartCoat 150 at Mid-Ohio with teammate Dean Thompson. Thompson was coming around to put Hingorani a lap down before Hingorani intentionally forced Thompson off the track. Hingorani was already summoned to the ARCA Menards officials hauler for an incident earlier in the race between him and Bob Schacht. On July 10, it was announced that Hingorani was suspended for one race (the main and East series combo race at Iowa), and was placed on probation for the rest of the season following the incident. Because Iowa was the fifth race of the East Series season, he would miss out on the 50-point bonus, which is given to every driver who competes in the first five races of the season, ultimately knocking him out of championship contention.

On August 18, 2023, it was announced that Hingorani would make his NASCAR Craftsman Truck Series debut at The Milwaukee Mile, driving the 61 truck for Hattori Racing Enterprises. He started 27th and finished 23rd. On October 27, it was announced that Hingorani would drive the 75 truck for Henderson Motorsports at the season finale in Phoenix.

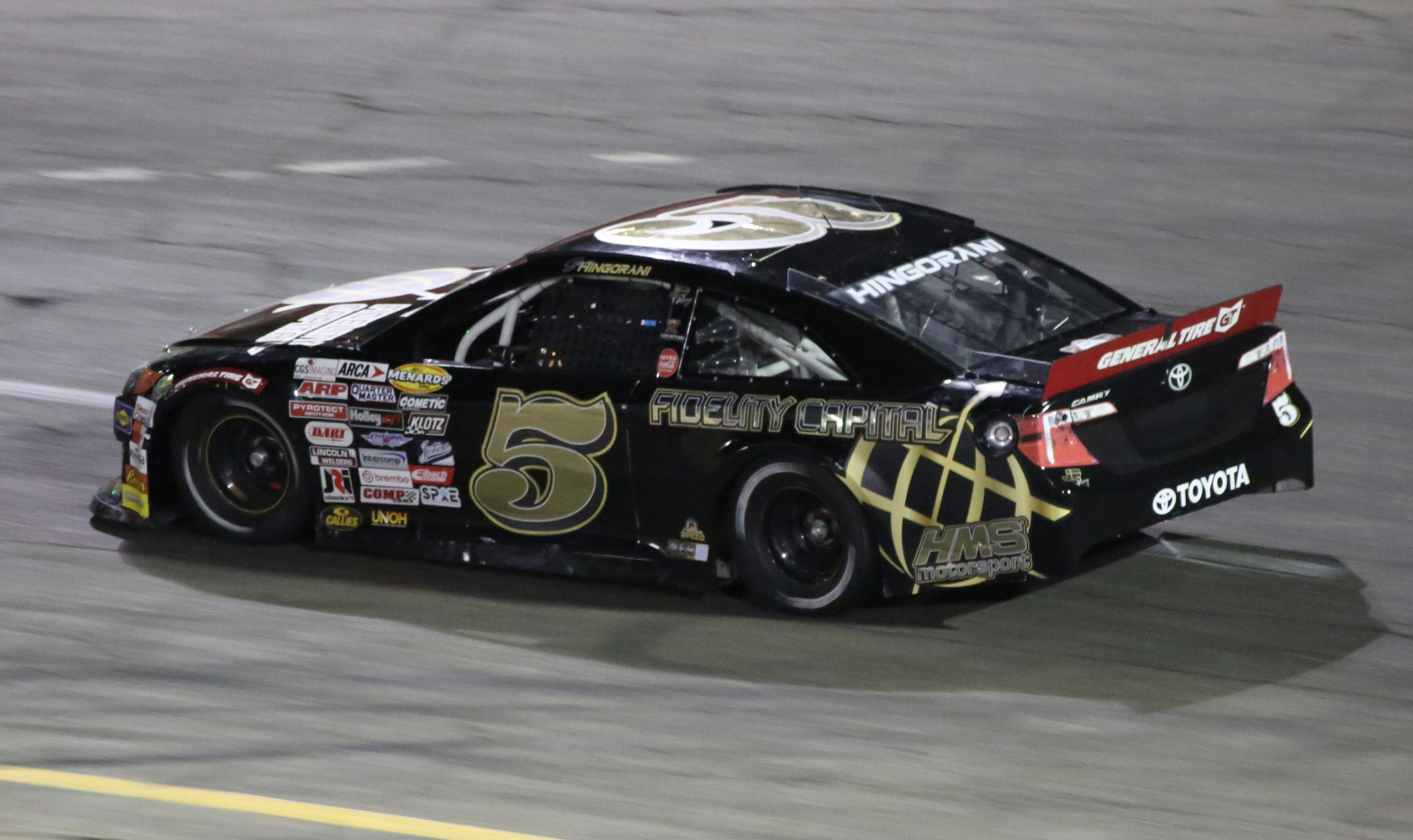
Hingorani's No. 5 car at All American Speedway in 2024

In 2024, it was announced that Hingorani would join Hattori Racing Enterprises and drive the No. 61 Toyota in the main ARCA series, the East and West series. However, after finishing fifth at Phoenix, Hingorani and HRE would part ways prior to the West Series race at Kevin Harvick's Kern Raceway, a race he and the team originally entered in. He would move over to the No. 24 Chevrolet for Sigma Performance Services, which was originally scheduled to be driven by team owner Joe Farré, who had to withdraw due to his company overseeing the cleanup of the Francis Scott Key Bridge, which had collapsed weeks prior, and HRE withdrew from the event entirely. Hingorani then drove the No. 5 Toyota for Jerry Pitts Racing at the next two events at Portland and Sonoma. In early June, He reunited with Venturini Motorsports to win both race 1 and race 2 of the Irwindale weekend. Hingorani returned to Jerry Pitts Racing to score two second-place finishes at Shasta and Tri-City. He returned to Venturini to win at Kern and finish third at Phoenix to secure his second consecutive ARCA West championship.

== Personal life ==
Hingorani's father, Navin, is an executive with Fidelity Capital, a firm that offers capital for financing and leasing to businesses. Fidelity sponsors much of Hingorani's racing endeavors.

== Motorsports career results ==
=== Racing career summary ===
Season	Series	Team	Races	Wins	Top 5	Top 10	Points	Position
2022	ARCA Menards Series West	Nascimento Motorsports	4	0	0	0	181	16th
2022	ARCA Menards Series West	Bill McAnally Racing	1	0	0	0	181	16th
2023	ASA STARS National Tour	Wilson Motorsports	1	0	0	0	33	84th
2023	ARCA Menards Series West	Venturini Motorsports	12	4	7	8	626	**1st**
2023	ARCA Menards Series East	Venturini Motorsports	7	0	5	6	322	7th
2023	ARCA Menards Series	Venturini Motorsports	9	0	5	5	326	12th
2023	NASCAR Craftsman Truck Series	Hattori Racing Enterprises	1	0	0	0	25	53rd
2023	NASCAR Craftsman Truck Series	Henderson Motorsports	1	0	0	0	25	53rd
2024	ASA STARS National Tour	Navin Hingorani	1	0	0	1	45	55th
2024	ARCA Menards Series West	Hattori Racing Enterprises	1	0	1	1	653	**1st**
2024	ARCA Menards Series West	Sigma Performance Services	1	0	1	1	653	**1st**
2024	ARCA Menards Series West	Jerry Pitts Racing	6	0	5	5	653	**1st**
2024	ARCA Menards Series West	Venturini Motorsports	4	3	4	4	653	**1st**
2024	ARCA Menards Series	Hattori Racing Enterprises	1	0	1	1	116	37th
2024	ARCA Menards Series	Venturini Motorsports	2	0	1	2	116	37th
2026	ARCA Menards Series West	Central Coast Racing	1	0	1	1	74	31st
2026	ARCA Menards Series West	Nascimento Motorsports	1	0	0	0	74	31st

=== NASCAR ===
(key) (Bold – Pole position awarded by qualifying time. Italics – Pole position earned by points standings or practice time. * – Most laps led.)

==== Craftsman Truck Series ====
NASCAR Craftsman Truck Series results
Year	Team	No.	Make	1	2	3	4	5	6	7	8	9	10	11	12	13	14	15	16	17	18	19	20	21	22	23	NCTC	Pts	Ref
2023	Hattori Racing Enterprises	61	Toyota	DAY	LVS	ATL	COA	TEX	BRD	MAR	KAN	DAR	NWS	CLT	GTW	NSH	MOH	POC	RCH	IRP	MLW; 23	KAN	BRI	TAL	HOM		53rd	25	
2023	Henderson Motorsports	75	Chevy																							PHO; 26	53rd	25	

^{*} Season still in progress
^{1} Ineligible for series points

=== ARCA Menards Series ===
(key) (Bold – Pole position awarded by qualifying time. Italics – Pole position earned by points standings or practice time. * – Most laps led. ** – All laps led.)

ARCA Menards Series results
Year	Team	No.	Make	1	2	3	4	5	6	7	8	9	10	11	12	13	14	15	16	17	18	19	20	AMSC	Pts	Ref
2023	Venturini Motorsports	15	Toyota	DAY	PHO; 16	TAL	KAN	CLT	BLN; 3	ELK; 3	**MOH**; 13	IOW	POC	MCH	IRP; 3	GLN	ISF	MLW; 3	DSF; 14	KAN	BRI; 15	SLM		12th	326	
2023	Venturini Motorsports	25	Toyota																				TOL; 3	12th	326	
2024	Hattori Racing Enterprises	61	Toyota	DAY	PHO; 5	TAL	DOV	KAN	CLT	IOW	MOH													37th	116	
2024	Venturini Motorsports	20	Toyota									BLN; 3	IRP	SLM	ELK; 8	MCH	ISF	MLW	DSF	GLN	BRI	KAN	TOL	37th	116	

==== ARCA Menards Series East ====
ARCA Menards Series East results
Year	Team	No.	Make	1	2	3	4	5	6	7	8	AMSEC	Pts	Ref
2023	Venturini Motorsports	15	Toyota	FIF; 4	DOV; 10	NSV; 3	**FRS**; 3*	IOW	IRP; 3	MLW; 3	BRI; 15	7th	322	

==== ARCA Menards Series West ====
ARCA Menards Series West results
Year	Team	No.	Make	1	2	3	4	5	6	7	8	9	10	11	12	13	AMSWC	Pts	Ref
2022	Nascimento Motorsports	4	Toyota	PHO	IRW	KCR	PIR	SON	IRW	EVG; 14			LVS; 25				16th	181	
2022	Nascimento Motorsports	04	Toyota								PIR; 12			PHO; 23			16th	181	
2022	Bill McAnally Racing	19	Toyota									AAS; 15					16th	181	
2023	Venturini Motorsports	15	Toyota	PHO; 16	IRW; 1	KCR; 1	PIR; 11	SON; 6	**IRW**; 12	SHA; 1	EVG; 1*	AAS; 2	**LVS**; 16*	MAD; 5	PHO; 3		1st	626	
2024	Hattori Racing Enterprises	61	Toyota	PHO; 5													1st	653	
2024	Sigma Performance Services	24	Chevy		KER; 4												1st	653	
2024	Jerry Pitts Racing	5	Toyota			PIR; 16	SON; 3			SHA; 2	**TRI**; 2*	MAD; 2	AAS; 4				1st	653	
2024	Venturini Motorsports	15	Toyota					IRW; 1**	IRW; 1					**KER**; 1**	PHO; 3		1st	653	
2026	Central Coast Racing	13	Toyota	KER; 5*	PHO	TUC	SHA	CNS	TRI	SON	PIR	AAS	MAD	LVS	PHO		31st	74	
2026	Nascimento Motorsports	4	Chevy													KER; 11	31st	74	

=== ASA STARS National Tour ===
(key) (Bold – Pole position awarded by qualifying time. Italics – Pole position earned by points standings or practice time. * – Most laps led. ** – All laps led.)

ASA STARS National Tour results
Year	Team	No.	Make	1	2	3	4	5	6	7	8	9	10	ASNTC	Pts	Ref
2023	Wilson Motorsports	20	Toyota	FIF	MAD	NWS	HCY	MLW; 19	AND	WIR	TOL	WIN	NSV	84th	33	
2024	Navin Hingorani	2	Toyota	NSM	FIF; 10	HCY	MAD	MLW	AND	OWO	TOL	WIN	NSV	55th	45	
