= 2024 Shasta 150 =

7th race of the 2024 ARCA Menards Series West

Race details
- Race 7 of 12 in the 2024 ARCA Menards Series West season
- Date: July 27, 2024
- Location: Shasta Speedway in Anderson, California
- Course: Permanent racing facility
- Course length: 0.50 miles (0.80 km)
- Distance: 150 laps, 56 mi (120 km)
- Scheduled distance: 150 laps, 56 mi (120 km)
- Average speed: 77.675 mph (125.006 km/h)

Pole position
Driver	Tyler Reif	Central Coast Racing
- Time: 16.033

Most laps led
Driver	Tyler Reif	Central Coast Racing
- Laps: 150

Winner
No. 13	Tyler Reif	Central Coast Racing

Television in the United States
- Network: FloRacing
- Announcers: Charles Krall

Radio in the United States
- Radio: ARCA Racing Network

The 2024 Shasta 150 was the 7th stock car race of the 2024 ARCA Menards Series West season, and the 2nd iteration of the event. The race was held on Saturday, July 27, 2024, at Shasta Speedway in Anderson, California, a 0.375 mile permanent paved oval shaped short track. The race took the scheduled 150 laps to complete. Tyler Reif, driving for Central Coast Racing, would have a perfect race, winning the pole and leading every lap of the event to earn his second career ARCA Menards Series West win, and his first of the season. This was also the first win for Central Coast Racing in the West Series since 2008. To fill out the podium, Sean Hingorani, driving for Jerry Pitts Racing, and Trevor Huddleston, driving for High Point Racing, would finish 2nd and 3rd, respectively.

== Report ==
Shasta Speedway, located in Anderson, California, was built in the late 1940s as a 3/8-mile dirt track. It spent a brief part of its life as a quarter-mile dirt oval in the early 1970s. In 2023, it hosted the ARCA Menards Series West for the first time since 2015, when it hosted the NASCAR K&N Pro Series West.

=== Entry list ===
- (R) denotes rookie driver.

#	Driver	Team	Make	Sponsor
3	Todd Souza	Central Coast Racing	Toyota	Central Coast Cabinets
05	David Smith	Shockwave Motorsports	Toyota	Shockwave Marine Suspension Seating
5	Sean Hingorani	Jerry Pitts Racing	Toyota	Fidelity Capital
7	Takuma Koga	Jerry Pitts Racing	Toyota	IKEDO Archetype
11	Robbie Kennealy (R)	Kennealy Keller Motorsports	Chevrolet	Setting The Stage / American Swim Academy
12	Kyle Keller	Kennealy Keller Motorsports	Ford	Setting The Stage / Battle Born
13	Tyler Reif	Central Coast Racing	Toyota	Central Coast Cabinets
16	Jack Wood	Bill McAnally Racing	Chevrolet	NAPA Auto Care
19	Eric Johnson Jr. (R)	Bill McAnally Racing	Chevrolet	Pacific Office Automation
23	Jaron Giannini	Sigma Performance Services	Chevrolet	Versatile / SPS / GMS Fabrication
50	Trevor Huddleston	High Point Racing	Ford	High Point Racing / Racecar Factory
71	Nick Joanides	Jan's Towing Racing	Ford	Jan's Towing
80	Derek Copeland	Derek Copeland Racing	Toyota	SK Construction / Wards Concrete
Official entry list

== Practice ==
The first and only practice session was held on Saturday, July 27, at 4:30 PM PST, and would last for 1 hour. Tyler Reif, driving for Central Coast Racing, would set the fastest time in the session, with a lap of 16.107, and a speed of 83.814 mph (134.886 km/h).

=== Practice results ===
Pos.	#	Driver	Team	Make	Time	Speed
1	13	Tyler Reif	Central Coast Racing	Toyota	16.107	83.814
2	16	Jack Wood	Bill McAnally Racing	Chevrolet	16.154	83.571
3	12	Kyle Keller	Kennealy Keller Motorsports	Ford	16.240	83.128
Full practice results

== Qualifying ==
Qualifying was held on Saturday, July 27, at 6:00 PM PST. The qualifying system used is a single-car, two-lap system with only one round. Drivers will be on track by themselves and will have two laps to post a qualifying time, and whoever sets the fastest time in that round will win the pole.

Tyler Reif, driving for Central Coast Racing, would score the pole for the race, with a lap of 16.033, and a speed of 84.201 mph (135.508 km/h).

=== Qualifying results ===
Pos.	#	Driver	Team	Make	Time	Speed
1	13	Tyler Reif	Central Coast Racing	Toyota	16.033	84.201
2	5	Sean Hingorani	Jerry Pitts Racing	Toyota	16.073	83.992
3	16	Jack Wood	Bill McAnally Racing	Chevrolet	16.093	83.887
4	50	Trevor Huddleston	High Point Racing	Ford	16.222	83.220
5	80	Derek Copeland	Derek Copeland Racing	Toyota	16.253	83.062
6	3	Todd Souza	Central Coast Racing	Toyota	16.305	82.797
7	12	Kyle Keller	Kennealy Keller Motorsports	Ford	16.314	82.751
8	23	Jaron Giannini	Sigma Performance Services	Toyota	16.331	82.665
9	71	Nick Joanides	Jan's Towing Racing	Ford	16.417	82.232
10	7	Takuma Koga	Jerry Pitts Racing	Toyota	16.571	81.468
11	11	Robbie Kennealy (R)	Kennealy Keller Motorsports	Chevrolet	17.037	79.239
12	05	David Smith	Shockwave Motorsports	Toyota	17.052	79.170
13	19	Eric Johnson Jr. (R)	Bill McAnally Racing	Chevrolet	–	–
Official qualifying results

== Race results ==
Fin	St	#	Driver	Team	Make	Laps	Led	Status	Pts
1	1	13	Tyler Reif	Central Coast Racing	Toyota	150	150	Running	49
2	2	5	Sean Hingorani	Jerry Pitts Racing	Toyota	150	0	Running	42
3	4	50	Trevor Huddleston	High Point Racing	Ford	150	0	Running	41
4	5	80	Derek Copeland	Derek Copeland Racing	Toyota	149	0	Running	40
5	7	12	Kyle Keller	Kennealy Keller Motorsports	Ford	149	0	Running	39
6	3	16	Jack Wood	Bill McAnally Racing	Chevrolet	149	0	Running	38
7	6	3	Todd Souza	Central Coast Racing	Ford	149	0	Running	37
8	9	71	Nick Joanides	Jan's Towing Racing	Ford	148	0	Running	36
9	10	7	Takuma Koga	Jerry Pitts Racing	Toyota	147	0	Running	35
10	12	05	David Smith	Shockwave Motorsports	Toyota	138	0	Running	34
11	8	23	Jaron Giannini	Sigma Performance Services	Toyota	121	0	Brakes	33
12	13	19	Eric Johnson Jr. (R)	Bill McAnally Racing	Chevrolet	121	0	Running	32
13	11	11	Robbie Kennealy (R)	Kennealy Keller Motorsports	Chevrolet	5	0	Mechanical	31
Official race results

== Standings after the race ==
Drivers' Championship standings

	Pos	Driver	Points
1	1	Tyler Reif	339
1	2	Sean Hingorani	335 (-4)
	3	Jack Wood	302 (–37)
	4	Trevor Huddleston	299 (–40)
	5	Kyle Keller	292 (–48)
	6	Nick Joanides	276 (–63)
	7	Eric Johnson Jr.	269 (–70)
	8	Takuma Koga	266 (–73)
	9	Todd Souza	255 (–84)
	10	David Smith	233 (–106)

- Note: Only the first 10 positions are included for the driver standings.

Previous race: 2024 West Coast Stock Car Motorsports Hall of Fame 150 (Irwindale)	ARCA Menards Series West; 2024 season	Next race: 2024 NAPA Auto Care 150
