= 2025 NAPA Auto Care 150 =

7th race of the 2025 ARCA Menards Series West

Race details
- Race 7 of 12 in the 2025 ARCA Menards Series West season
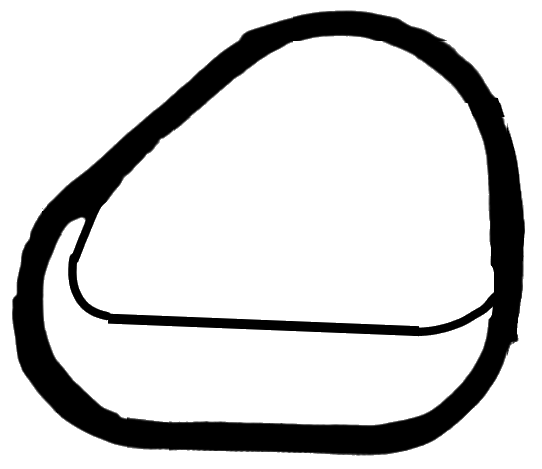
- Date: August 9, 2025
- Location: Tri-City Raceway in West Richland, Washington
- Course: Permanent racing facility
- Course length: 0.50 miles (0.80 km)
- Distance: 150 laps, 56 mi (120 km)
- Scheduled distance: 150 laps, 56 mi (120 km)
- Average speed: 64.702 mph (104.128 km/h)

Pole position
Driver	Jake Bollman	Bill McAnally Racing
- Time: 19.020

Most laps led
Driver	Jake Bollman	Bill McAnally Racing
- Laps: 74

Winner
No. 71	Kyle Keller	Jan's Towing Racing

Television in the United States
- Network: FloRacing
- Announcers: Charles Krall

Radio in the United States
- Radio: ARCA Racing Network

The 2025 NAPA Auto Care 150 was the 7th stock car race of the 2025 ARCA Menards Series West season, and the 2nd iteration of the event. The race was held on Saturday, August 9, 2025, at Tri-City Raceway in West Richland, Washington, a 0.50-mile (0.80 km) permanent oval shaped short track. The race took the scheduled 150 laps to complete. Kyle Keller, driving for Jan's Towing Racing, took advantage of a late restart, and held off Jake Bollman in a five-lap shootout to earn his first career ARCA Menards Series West win, and the first win for Jan's Towing Racing. To fill out the podium, Greg Biffle, driving for Sigma Performance Services, would finish in 3rd, respectively. Bollman and Biffle dominated the race itself, leading a combined 145 laps with Bollman leading the race-high 74 laps.

== Report ==
=== Background ===
Tri-City Raceway is a 0.500 mi (0.805 km) asphalt oval race track located in West Richland, Washington. Tri-City Raceway is currently being featured in the ARCA Menards Series West division of NASCAR. The track was built to represent and named after the three nearby cities to the racetrack. The track is the only 0.500 mi (0.805 km) mile paved trioval in North America.

=== Entry list ===
- (R) denotes rookie driver.

#	Driver	Team	Make
1	Robbie Kennealy (R)	Jan's Towing Racing	Ford
3	Todd Souza	Central Coast Racing	Toyota
05	David Smith	Shockwave Motorsports	Toyota
5	Eric Johnson Jr.	Jerry Pitts Racing	Toyota
13	Tanner Reif	Central Coast Racing	Toyota
19	Jake Bollman (R)	Bill McAnally Racing	Chevrolet
23	Greg Biffle	Sigma Performance Services	Chevrolet
31	Tyler Brown	Rise Motorsports	Toyota
50	Trevor Huddleston	High Point Racing	Ford
51	Blake Lothian (R)	Strike Mamba Racing	Chevrolet
71	Kyle Keller	Jan's Towing Racing	Ford
72	Jonathan Reaume	Strike Mamba Racing	Chevrolet
Official entry list

== Practice ==
The first and only practice session was held on Saturday, August 9, at 2:45 PM PST, and would last for 60 minutes. Greg Biffle, driving for Sigma Performance Services, would set the fastest time in the session, with a lap of 19.117, and a speed of 94.157 mph (151.531 km/h).

Pos.	#	Driver	Team	Make	Time	Speed
1	23	Greg Biffle	Sigma Performance Services	Chevrolet	19.117	94.157
2	19	Jake Bollman (R)	Bill McAnally Racing	Chevrolet	19.335	93.095
3	13	Tanner Reif	Central Coast Racing	Toyota	19.383	92.865
Full practice results

== Qualifying ==
Qualifying was held on Saturday, August 9, at 4:45 PM PST. The qualifying procedure used is a single-car, two-lap system with one round. Drivers will be on track by themselves and will have two laps to post a qualifying time, and whoever sets the fastest time will win the pole.

Jake Bollman, driving for Bill McAnally Racing, would score the pole for the race, with a lap of 19.020, and a speed of 94.637 mph (152.303 km/h).

=== Qualifying results ===
Pos.	#	Driver	Team	Make	Time	Speed
1	19	Jake Bollman (R)	Bill McAnally Racing	Chevrolet	19.020	94.637
2	23	Greg Biffle	Sigma Performance Services	Chevrolet	19.043	94.523
3	1	Robbie Kennealy (R)	Jan's Towing Racing	Ford	19.121	94.137
4	13	Tanner Reif	Central Coast Racing	Toyota	19.145	94.019
5	50	Trevor Huddleston	High Point Racing	Ford	19.194	93.779
6	5	Eric Johnson Jr.	Jerry Pitts Racing	Toyota	19.211	93.696
7	71	Kyle Keller	Jan's Towing Racing	Ford	19.304	93.245
8	3	Todd Souza	Central Coast Racing	Toyota	19.417	92.702
9	51	Blake Lothian (R)	Strike Mamba Racing	Chevrolet	19.695	91.394
10	31	Tyler Brown	Rise Motorsports	Toyota	19.993	90.032
11	72	Jonathan Reaume	Strike Mamba Racing	Chevrolet	20.123	89.450
12	05	David Smith	Shockwave Motorsports	Toyota	20.971	85.833
Official qualifying results

== Race results ==
Fin	St	#	Driver	Team	Make	Laps	Led	Status	Pts
1	7	71	Kyle Keller	Jan's Towing Racing	Ford	150	5	Running	47
2	1	19	Jake Bollman (R)	Bill McAnally Racing	Chevrolet	150	74	Running	45
3	2	23	Greg Biffle	Sigma Performance Services	Chevrolet	150	71	Running	42
4	3	1	Robbie Kennealy (R)	Jan's Towing Racing	Ford	150	0	Running	40
5	5	50	Trevor Huddleston	High Point Racing	Ford	150	0	Running	39
6	4	13	Tanner Reif	Central Coast Racing	Toyota	150	0	Running	38
7	6	5	Eric Johnson Jr.	Jerry Pitts Racing	Toyota	150	0	Running	37
8	8	3	Todd Souza	Central Coast Racing	Toyota	150	0	Running	36
9	10	31	Tyler Brown	Rise Motorsports	Toyota	149	0	Running	35
10	9	51	Blake Lothian (R)	Strike Mamba Racing	Chevrolet	148	0	Running	34
11	12	05	David Smith	Shockwave Motorsports	Toyota	141	0	Running	33
12	11	72	Jonathan Reaume	Strike Mamba Racing	Chevrolet	132	0	Running	32
Official race results

== Standings after the race ==
Drivers' Championship standings

	Pos	Driver	Points
	1	Trevor Huddleston	338
1	2	Kyle Keller	331 (–7)
1	3	Tanner Reif	323 (–15)
	4	Eric Johnson Jr.	308 (–30)
	5	Robbie Kennealy	304 (–34)
	6	Blake Lothian	275 (–63)
	7	David Smith	254 (–84)
	8	Jake Bollman	190 (–148)
	9	Todd Souza	163 (–175)
1	10	Jonathan Reaume	115 (–223)

- Note: Only the first 10 positions are included for the driver standings.

Previous race: 2025 General Tire 200 (Sonoma)	ARCA Menards Series West; 2025 season	Next race: 2025 Portland 112
