= Trevor Huddleston (racing driver) =

American racing driver (born 1996)

- Huddleston at Madera Speedway in 2026
- Born: May 31, 1996 (age 30); Agoura Hills, California, U.S.
- Achievements: 2025, 2026 ARCA Menards Series West Champion

ARCA Menards Series career
- 5 races run over 5 years
- ARCA no., team: No. 50 (High Point Racing)
- Best finish: 80th (2026)
- First race: 2021 General Tire 150 (Phoenix)
- Last race: 2026 General Tire 150 (Phoenix)
Wins	Top tens	Poles
0	3	0

ARCA Menards Series West career
- 103 races run over 10 years
- ARCA West no., team: No. 50 (High Point Racing)
- Best finish: 1st (2025, 2026)
- First race: 2016 Toyota/NAPA Auto Parts 150 (Irwindale)
- Last race: 2026 NAPA Auto Parts 150 (Bakersfield)
- First win: 2019 Enoes NAPA Auto 150 (Irwindale)
- Last win: 2026 Legendary Billy Green 150 (Colorado)
Wins	Top tens	Poles
11	85	5
- Statistics up to date as of November 1, 2026.

Trevor Huddleston (born May 31, 1996) is an American stock car racing driver who competes full-time in the ARCA Menards Series West, driving the No. 50 Ford for his family-owned team, High Point Racing. He is the 2025 and 2026 ARCA Menards Series West champion.

== Racing career ==
=== Early career ===
Huddleston started his career in bandolero racing in 2008. After racing in the Sportsman class at Irwindale Speedway in 2011, Huddleston raced late models at Madera Speedway in 2014. Throughout his career, he has raced for High Point Racing, which his father owns. In 2015, Huddleston claimed his first Irwindale track championship, winning five late model races.

For the 2016 season, Huddleston raced almost exclusively at Irwindale Speedway, winning ten races.

In 2017, Huddleston competed at Irwindale, Kern County Raceway Park and Tucson Speedway. Between the three tracks, he competed in 35 races, winning 22 of them. After staying in contention all year, Huddleston finished three points behind Lee Pulliam for the NASCAR Whelen All-American Series title.

=== ARCA ===
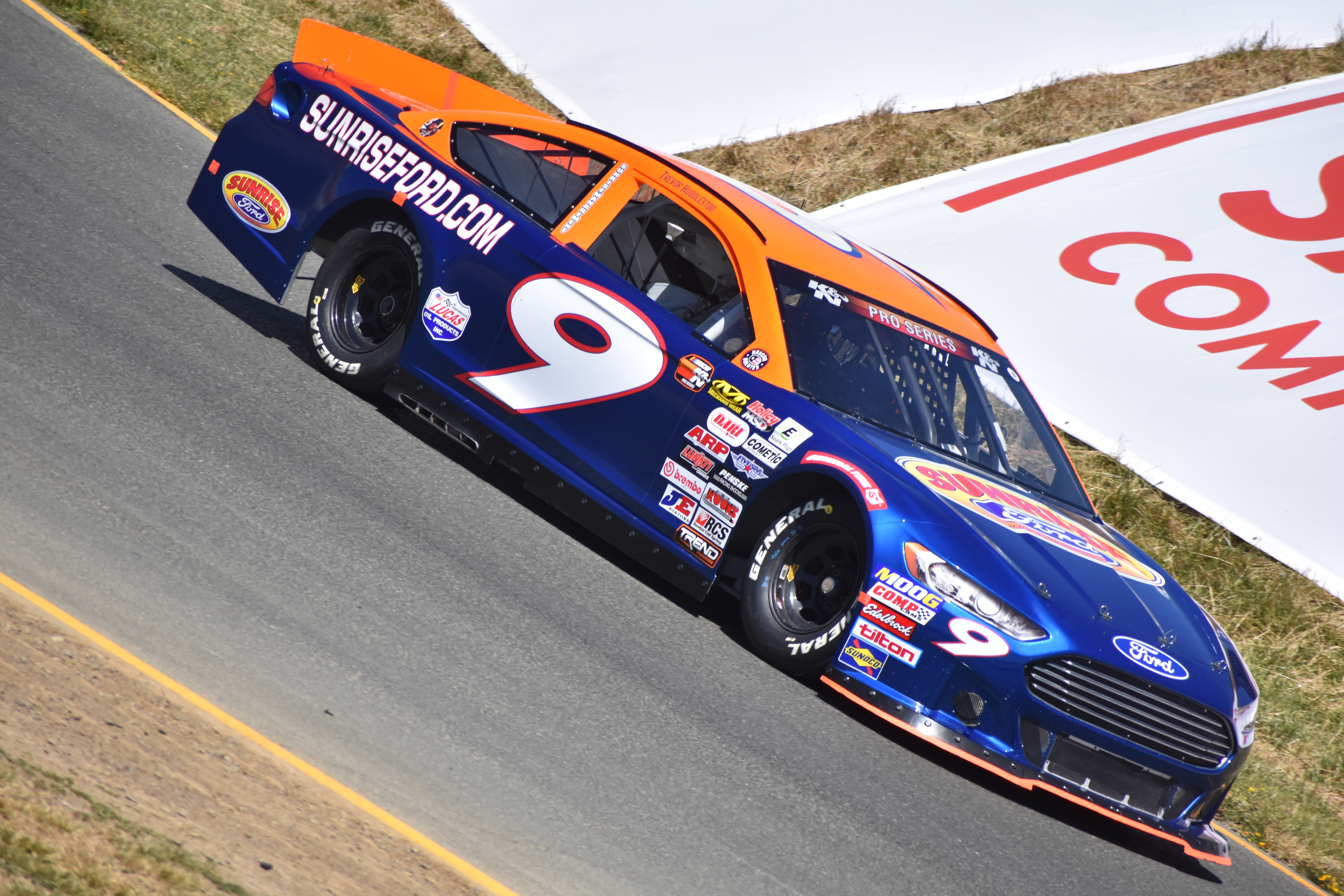
Huddleston during qualifying at Sonoma in 2019.

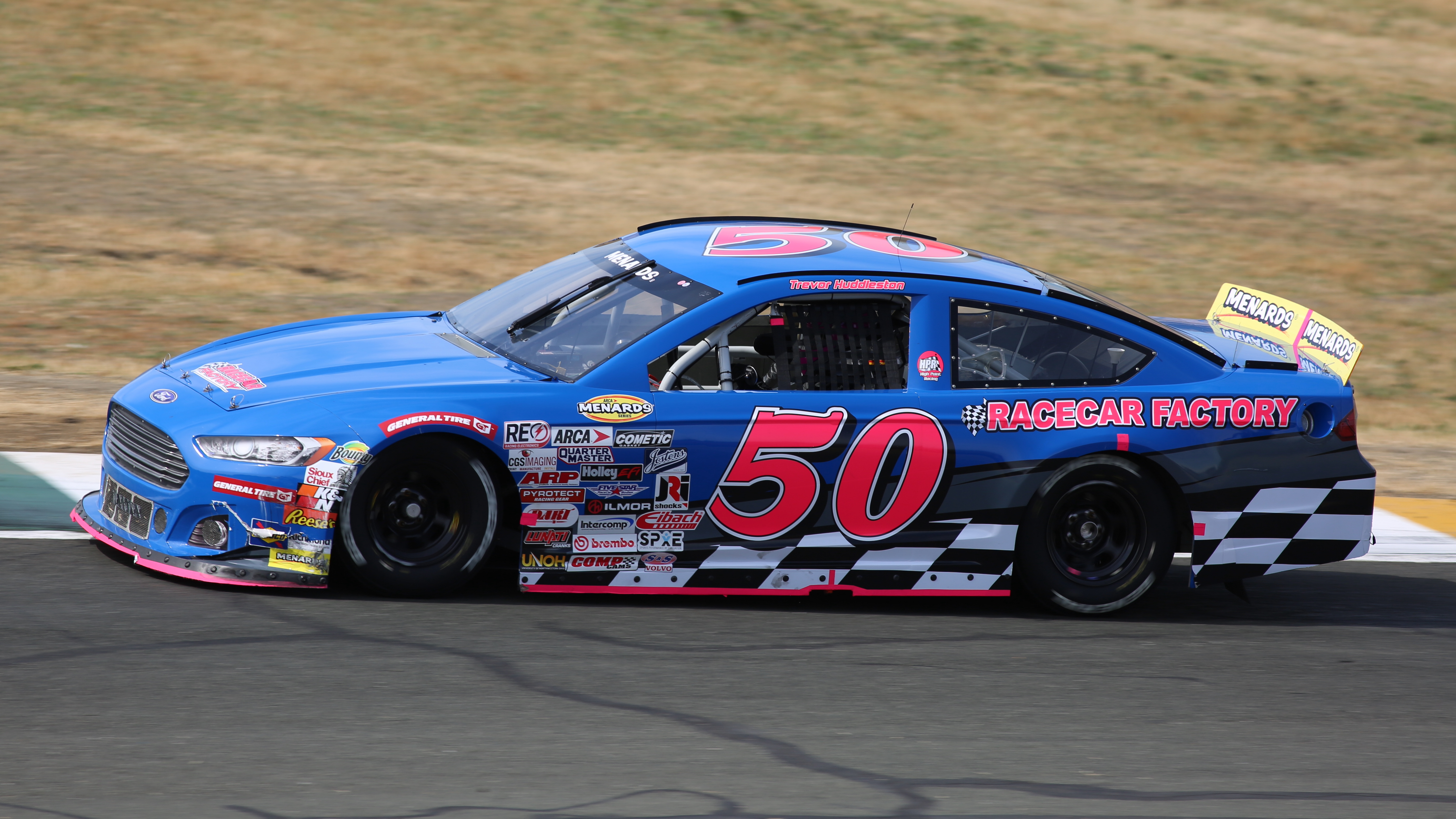
Huddleston's No. 50 ARCA car at Sonoma in 2023

Huddleston made his NASCAR K&N Pro Series West debut in 2016 with Sunrise Ford Racing, finishing tenth at Irwindale.

After not racing in the series 2017, Huddleston returned to the K&N Pro Series West in 2018 for what he presumed to be a limited slate with Sunrise Ford Racing; eventually, it turned into a full-season effort. He would finish the season sixth in points.

On March 30, 2019, Huddleston earned his first career K&N Pro Series win, scoring the victory at his home track of Irwindale in a photo finish over Tanner Gray. He won a second race that year, this time at Evergeen Speedway, and finished foutth in the points standings,

Huddleston moved to Sunrise Ford's No. 6 in 2020 and remained in the ride for 2021. He did not score any wins during this time and finished fourth and sixth in the points standings respectively.

In 2022, after he lost his ride to Tanner Reif, he joined his family-owned team High Point Racing in the No. 50 Ford for the first Irwindale race, where he finished sixth. He would also run Kern County and the second Irwindale race, finishing seventh and third respectively.

In 2023, Huddleston drove the HPR No. 50 full time. He would win a race at his home track of Irwindale. Huddleston finished a career high third in the points standings.

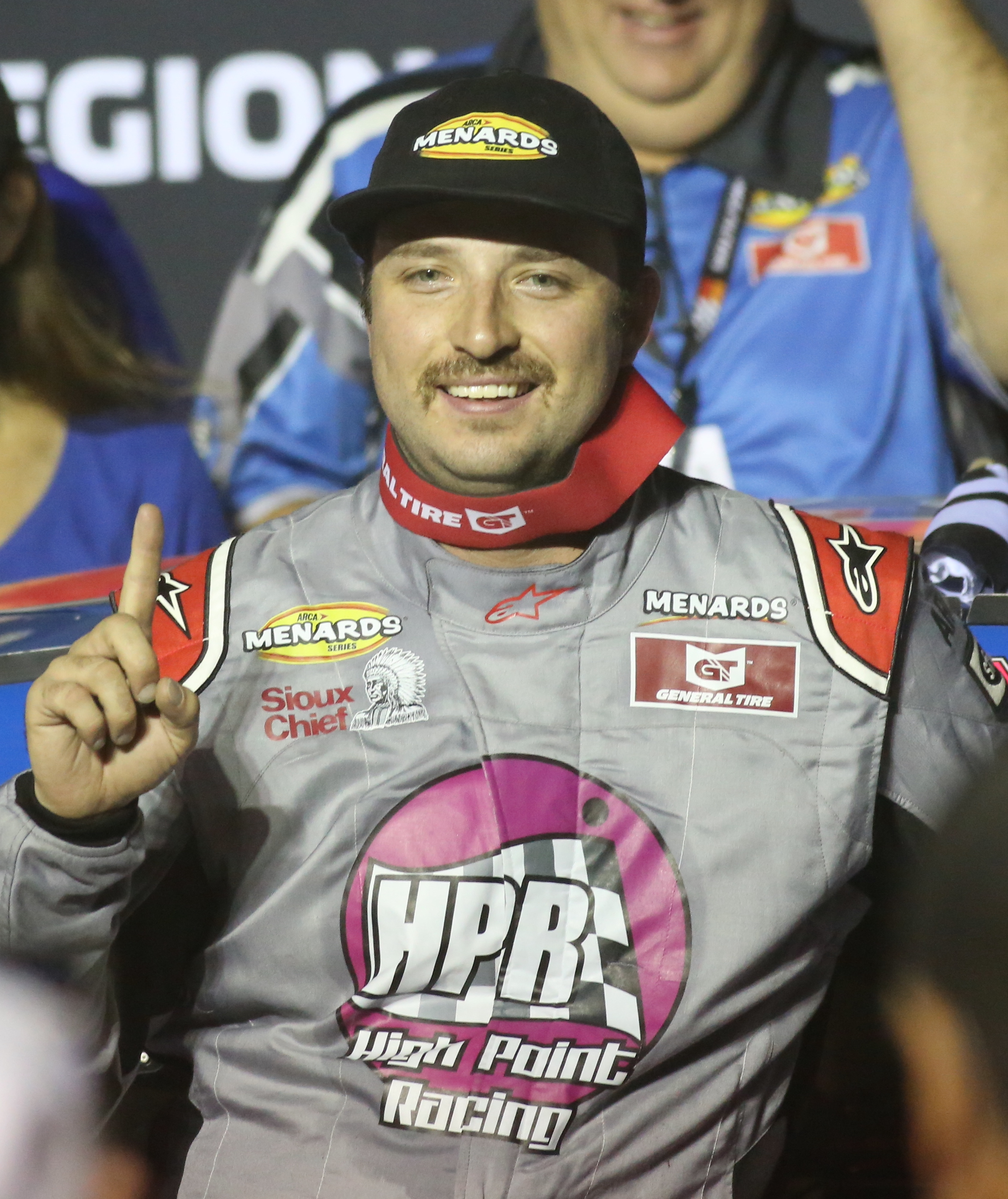
Huddleston celebrating his victory at Madera Speedway in 2025

Huddleston returned to the No. 50 in 2024. He would win back to back races at Madera Speedway and All American Speedway. For the second season in a row, he would finish third in the points standings.

For 2025, Huddleston got off to a hot start, winning the first race at Kern, then later winning at Kern again, followed by winning back-to-back races at Madera Speedway and The Bullring at Las Vegas Motor Speedway. At the season's end, he would be the series champion.

In 2026, Huddleston started slowly, earning wins at Shasta and Colorado. He scored enough points to be the series champion for the second straight year.

== Personal life ==
Huddleston attends Moorpark College. His father, Tim, was also a track champion at Irwindale. Huddleston proposed to his girlfriend, Nastasia Dodd, in victory lane after winning the 2024 West Coast Stock Car Motorsports Hall of Fame 150 at Madera Speedway, the track where they met.

== Motorsports career results ==
=== Racing career summary ===
Season	Series	Team	Races	Wins	Top 5	Top 10	Points	Position
2016	NASCAR K&N Pro Series West	Sunrise Ford Racing	1	0	0	1	34	43rd
2018	NASCAR K&N Pro Series West	Sunrise Ford Racing	14	0	3	11	504	6th
2019	NASCAR K&N Pro Series West	Sunrise Ford Racing	14	2	6	13	534	4th
2020	ARCA Menards Series West	Sunrise Ford Racing	11	0	7	9	572	4th
2021	ARCA Menards Series West	Sunrise Ford Racing	9	0	2	7	422	6th
2021	ARCA Menards Series	Sunrise Ford Racing	1	0	0	1	34	85th
2022	ARCA Menards Series West	High Point Racing	4	0	1	4	152	23rd
2023	ARCA Menards Series West	High Point Racing	12	1	6	8	578	**3rd**
2023	ARCA Menards Series	High Point Racing	1	0	0	1	35	82nd
2024	ARCA Menards Series West	High Point Racing	12	2	6	9	606	**3rd**
2024	ARCA Menards Series	High Point Racing	1	0	0	0	27	92nd
2025	ARCA Menards Series West	High Point Racing	12	4	10	11	650	**1st**
2025	ARCA Menards Series	High Point Racing	1	0	0	0	32	104th
2026	ARCA Menards Series West	High Point Racing	13	2	9	11	596*	**1st**
2026	ARCA Menards Series	High Point Racing	1	0	1	1	40	80th

=== ARCA Menards Series ===
(key) (Bold – Pole position awarded by qualifying time. Italics – Pole position earned by points standings or practice time. * – Most laps led. ** – All laps led.)

ARCA Menards Series results
Year	Team	No.	Make	1	2	3	4	5	6	7	8	9	10	11	12	13	14	15	16	17	18	19	20	AMSC	Pts	Ref
2021	Sunrise Ford Racing	6	Ford	DAY	PHO; 10	TAL	KAN	TOL	CLT	MOH	POC	ELK	BLN	IOW	WIN	GLN	MCH	ISF	MLW	DSF	BRI	SLM	KAN	85th	34	
2023	High Point Racing	50	Ford	DAY	PHO; 10	TAL	KAN	CLT	BLN	ELK	MOH	IOW	POC	MCH	IRP	GLN	ISF	MLW	DSF	KAN	BRI	SLM	TOL	82nd	35	
2024	High Point Racing	50	Ford	DAY	PHO; 17	TAL	DOV	KAN	CLT	IOW	MOH	BLN	IRP	SLM	ELK	MCH	ISF	MLW	DSF	GLN	BRI	KAN	TOL	92nd	27	
2025	High Point Racing	50	Ford	DAY	PHO; 12	TAL	KAN	CLT	MCH	BLN	ELK	LRP	DOV	IRP	IOW	GLN	ISF	MAD	DSF	BRI	SLM	KAN	TOL	104th	32	
2026	High Point Racing	50	Ford	DAY	PHO; 4	KAN	TAL	GLN	TOL	MCH	POC	BER	ELK	CHI	LRP	IRP	IOW	ISF	MAD	DSF	SLM	BRI	KAN	80th	40	

==== ARCA Menards Series West ====
ARCA Menards Series West results
Year	Team	No.	Make	1	2	3	4	5	6	7	8	9	10	11	12	13	14	AMSWC	Pts	Ref
2016	Sunrise Ford Racing	22	Ford	IRW; 10	KCR	TUS	OSS	CNS	SON	SLS	IOW	EVG	DCS	MMP	MMP	MER	AAS	43rd	34	
2018	Sunrise Ford Racing	22	Ford	KCR; 6	TUS; 11	TUS; 5	OSS; 6	CNS; 3	SON; 20	DCS; 8	IOW; 9	EVG; 10	GTW; 7	LVS; 7	MER; 6	AAS; 11	KCR; 3	6th	504	
2019	Sunrise Ford Racing	9	Ford	LVS; 7	IRW; 1	TUS; 7	TUS; 4	CNS; 9	SON; 10	DCS; 4	IOW; 8	EVG; 1*	GTW; 18	MER; 3	AAS; 3	KCR; 8	PHO; 8	4th	534	
2020	Sunrise Ford Racing	6	Ford	LVS; 5	MMP; 13	MMP; 5	IRW; 2	EVG; 2	DCS; 5	CNS; 6	LVS; 12	AAS; 3	KCR; 4	PHO; 7				4th	572	
2021	Sunrise Ford Racing	6	Ford	PHO; 10	SON; 12	IRW; 6	CNS; 10	IRW; 10*	PIR; 7	LVS; 3	AAS; 3	PHO; 15						6th	422	
2022	High Point Racing	50	Ford	PHO	IRW; 6	KCR; 7	PIR	SON	IRW; 3	EVG; 8	PIR	AAS	LVS	PHO				23rd	152	
2023	High Point Racing	50	Ford	PHO; 9	**IRW**; 4	KCR; 3	PIR; 12	SON; 28	IRW; 1*	**SHA**; 2*	EVG; 6	AAS; 15	LVS; 2	MAD; 10	PHO; 20			3rd	578	
2024	High Point Racing	50	Ford	PHO; 17	KER; 2	PIR; 8	SON; 18	IRW; 4	IRW; 9*	SHA; 3	TRI; 7	MAD; 1*	**AAS**; 1**	KER; 3	PHO; 13			3rd	606	
2025	High Point Racing	50	Ford	KER; 1*	PHO; 12	TUC; 5*	CNS; 3	KER; 1*	SON; 4	TRI; 5	PIR; 5	AAS; 2	MAD; 1**	LVS; 1*	PHO; 10			1st	650	
2026	High Point Racing	50	Ford	KER; 4	PHO; 4	TUC; 2	**SHA**; 1*	CNS; 1*	TRI; 2	SON; 9	PIR; 13	AAS; 2*	**MAD**; 2*	LVS; 5*	PHO; 7	KER; 5		1st	685	

^{*} Season still in progress
