= 2022 NAPA Auto Parts ARCA West 150 =

7th race of the 2022 ARCA Menards Series West

Race details
- Race 7 of 11 of the 2022 ARCA Menards Series West
- Date: August 20, 2022
- Official name: 59th Annual NAPA Auto Parts ARCA West 150
- Location: Evergreen Speedway, Monroe, Washington
- Course: Permanent racing facility
- Course length: 0.656 miles (1.039 km)
- Distance: 150 laps, 96.9 mi (155.94 km)
- Average speed: 66.858 mph (107.598 km/h)

Pole position
Driver	Tanner Reif	Sunrise Ford Racing
- Time: 23.340

Most laps led
Driver	Cole Moore	Bill McAnally Racing
- Laps: 61

Winner
No. 9	Tanner Reif	Sunrise Ford Racing

Television in the United States
- Network: USA Network (Delayed until August 26, 2022); FloSports (Live Stream)
- Announcers: Charles Krall

Radio in the United States
- Radio: ARCA Racing Network

The 2022 NAPA Auto Parts ARCA West 150 was the 7th stock car race of the 2022 ARCA Menards Series West season, and the 61st iteration of the event. The race was held on Saturday, August 20, 2022, in Monroe, Washington at Evergreen Speedway, a 0.656 mile (1.039 km) permanent oval-shaped short track. The race took the scheduled 150 laps to complete. After a late race caution, Tanner Reif, driving for Sunrise Ford Racing, took the lead away from Cole Moore, and held off teammate Jake Drew for his second career ARCA Menards Series West win, and his second of the season. To fill out the podium, Joey Iest, driving for Naake-Klauer Motorsports, would finish 3rd, respectively.

This race was mostly known as the 1,000th ARCA West race to be held in series history.

== Background ==
Evergreen Speedway is an automobile racetrack located within the confines of the Evergreen State Fairgrounds in Monroe, Washington. The stadium can accommodate up to 7500 spectators in the covered grandstand and an additional 7500 in the uncovered modular grandstands. The layout of the track is unique in that it incorporates an oversized 5/8-mile paved outer oval, a 3/8-mile paved inner oval, a 1/5-mile paved inner oval, a 1/8-mile dragstrip, and the #2 ranked figure-eight track in the United States. The track is the only sanctioned NASCAR track in Washington State. Evergreen Speedway hosts Formula D the third weekend in July every year. Along with NASCAR, the multi-purpose track can be configured to road courses with sanctioned SCCA, USAC, ASA and NSRA events. Under new ownership for the 2011 season and beyond, Evergreen Speedway has become a NASCAR Top Ten Short Track in North America from 2012 though 2016.

=== Entry list ===
- (R) denotes rookie driver

#	Driver	Team	Make
4	Sean Hingorani	Nascimento Motorsports	Toyota
05	David Smith	David Smith Racing	Toyota
6	Jake Drew	Sunrise Ford Racing	Ford
7	Takuma Koga	Jerry Pitts Racing	Toyota
9	Tanner Reif (R)	Sunrise Ford Racing	Ford
11	Chris Lowden	Lowden Motorsports	Chevrolet
12	Kyle Keller	Kyle Keller Racing	Ford
13	Todd Souza	Central Coast Racing	Ford
16	Landen Lewis	Bill McAnally Racing	Chevrolet
21	R. J. Smotherman	Kart Idaho Racing	Ford
39	Andrew Tuttle	Last Chance Racing	Chevrolet
50	Trevor Huddleston	Huddleston Racing	Ford
54	Joey Iest	Naake-Klauer Motorsports	Ford
88	Bridget Burgess	BMI Racing	Chevrolet
99	Cole Moore	Bill McAnally Racing	Chevrolet
Official entry list

== Practice/Qualifying ==
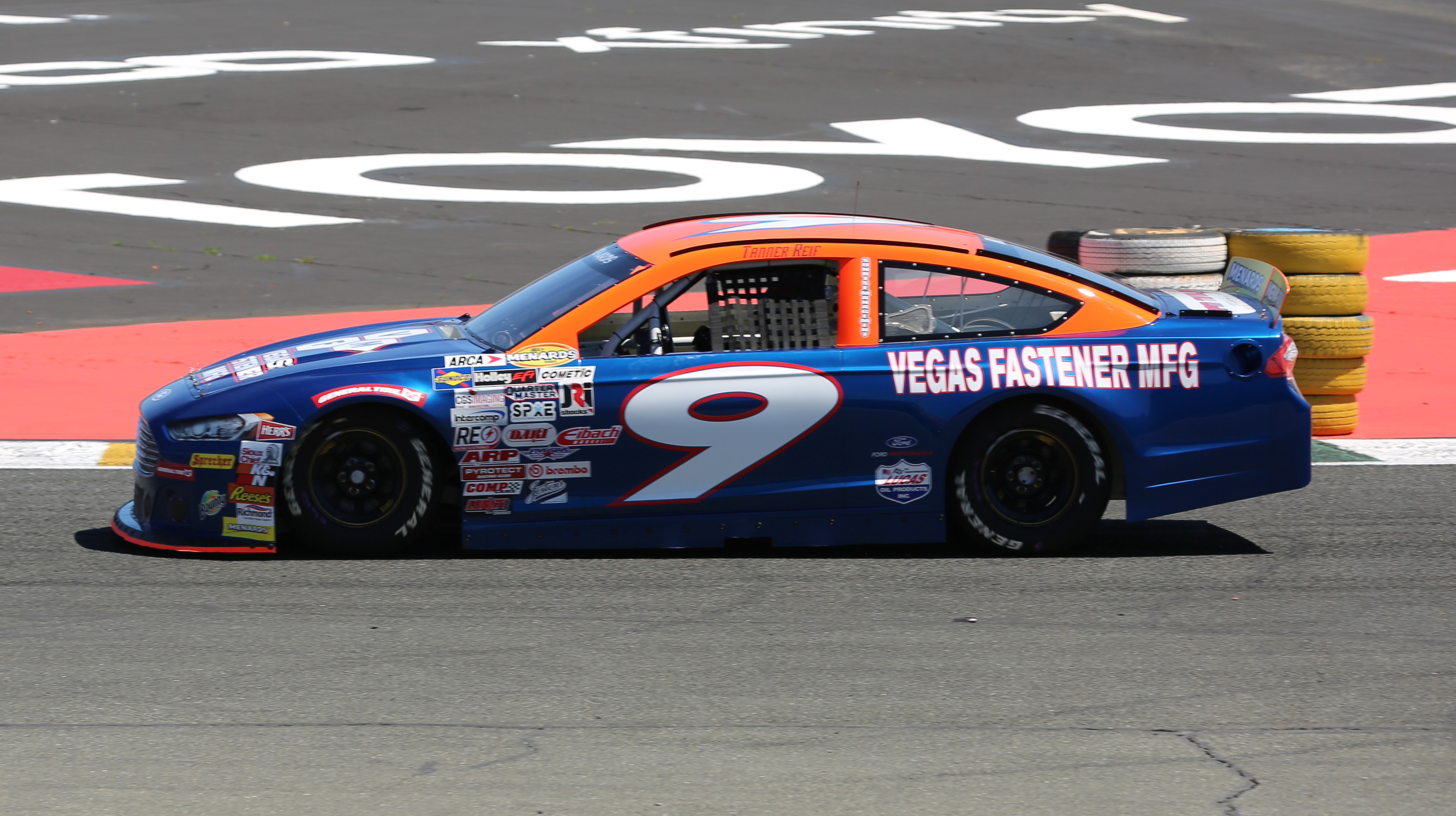
Tanner Reif won the pole for the race. He would ultimately win the race as well.

Practice and qualifying were both combined into one 90-minute session, with a driver's fastest time counting as their qualifying lap. It was held on Saturday, August 20, at 2:30 PM PST. Tanner Reif, driving for Sunrise Ford Racing, scored the pole for the race, with a lap of 23.340, and an average speed of 96.401 mph (155.142 km/h).

Pos.	#	Driver	Team	Make	Time	Speed
1	9	Tanner Reif (R)	Sunrise Ford Racing	Ford	23.340	96.401
2	16	Landen Lewis	Bill McAnally Racing	Chevrolet	23.437	96.002
3	6	Jake Drew	Sunrise Ford Racing	Ford	23.474	95.851
4	99	Cole Moore	Bill McAnally Racing	Chevrolet	23.543	95.570
5	13	Todd Souza	Central Coast Racing	Ford	23.569	95.464
6	54	Joey Iest	Naake-Klauer Motorsports	Ford	23.725	94.837
7	4	Sean Hingorani	Nascimento Motorsports	Toyota	23.730	94.817
8	50	Trevor Huddleston	Huddleston Racing	Ford	23.833	94.407
9	7	Takuma Koga	Jerry Pitts Racing	Toyota	23.878	94.229
10	12	Kyle Keller	Kyle Keller Racing	Ford	23.941	93.981
11	88	Bridget Burgess	BMI Racing	Chevrolet	25.087	89.688
12	11	Chris Lowden	Lowden Motorsports	Chevrolet	25.330	88.827
13	21	R. J. Smotherman	Kart Idaho Racing	Ford	25.660	87.685
14	39	Andrew Tuttle	Last Chance Racing	Chevrolet	25.831	87.105
15	05	David Smith	David Smith Racing	Toyota	25.864	86.994
Official practice/qualifying results

== Race results ==
Fin.	St	#	Driver	Team	Make	Laps	Led	Status	Pts
1	1	9	Tanner Reif (R)	Sunrise Ford Racing	Ford	150	59	Running	48
2	3	6	Jake Drew	Sunrise Ford Racing	Ford	150	0	Running	42
3	6	54	Joey Iest	Naake-Klauer Motorsports	Ford	150	0	Running	41
4	4	99	Cole Moore	Bill McAnally Racing	Chevrolet	150	61	Running	42
5	5	13	Todd Souza	Central Coast Racing	Ford	150	0	Running	39
6	2	16	Landen Lewis	Bill McAnally Racing	Chevrolet	150	0	Running	39
7	10	12	Kyle Keller	Kyle Keller Racing	Ford	150	0	Running	37
8	8	50	Trevor Huddleston	Huddleston Racing	Ford	150	0	Running	36
9	9	7	Takuma Koga	Jerry Pitts Racing	Toyota	150	0	Running	35
10	11	88	Bridget Burgess	BMI Racing	Chevrolet	149	0	Running	34
11	14	39	Andrew Tuttle	Last Chance Racing	Chevrolet	141	0	Running	33
12	12	11	Chris Lowden	Lowden Motorsports	Chevrolet	128	0	Running	32
13	15	05	David Smith	David Smith Racing	Toyota	117	0	Accident	31
14	7	4	Sean Hingorani	Nascimento Motorsports	Toyota	71	0	Accident	30
15	13	21	R. J. Smotherman	Kart Idaho Racing	Ford	16	0	Handling	29
Official race results

Previous race: 2022 NAPA Auto Parts 150 (July race)	ARCA Menards Series West; 2022 season	Next race: 2022 ARCA Portland 112
