= Wiley X =

- Formerly: Protective Optics, Inc
- Company type: Private
- Industry: Protective eyewear and gear
- Founded: 1987
- Headquarters: Frisco, TX
- Key people: Myles R. Freeman (Founder)
- Products: Safety glasses, sunglasses, goggles
- Website: https://www.wileyx.com/

Wiley X is an American private company that designs and manufactures protective eyewear for military, law enforcement, and civilian use. Founded in 1987 by U.S. Army veteran Myles R. Freeman Sr., the company initially operated under the name Protective Optics, Inc.

== History ==
In 1987, U.S. Army Veteran Myles R. Freeman Sr. founded the company Protective Optics, Inc. in Daly City, California by creating shooting glasses for several FBI agents from one office.

In 1990, the company began producing protective eyewear and sunglasses for civilian needs, e.g. in motorsport, cycling, fishing, hunting, and industrial manufacturing. In November 2007, Protective Optics, Inc. changed its name to Wiley X, Inc.

The company moved the headquarters in 2010 to a building in Livermore, California where it remained until moving to Frisco, Texas in 2022.

Wiley X has partnerships with professional athletes, non-profits and the entertainment industry over.

=== Protection Standards ===
In a book Battle Rattle (2006 Windrow & Greene) by Hans Halberstadt the author states that the 82nd Airborne Division was the first one to buy Wiley X in bulk, ordering thousands of the SG-1s goggles, originally developed for Ranger regiment, shortly after deploying in Afghanistan in spring 2002.

Wiley X is eyewear meets the ANSI Z87.1+ standards for clarity, high-velocity and high mass impacts.

=== Appearance in movies and TV ===
- American Sniper
- Army of the Dead
- Bright (2017)
- SWAT
- The Office:
- Big Little Lies
