= King Taco =

American fast food restaurant chain

- Type: Fast food restaurant
- Founded: 1974
- Founder: Raul Martínez
- Headquarters: Los Angeles

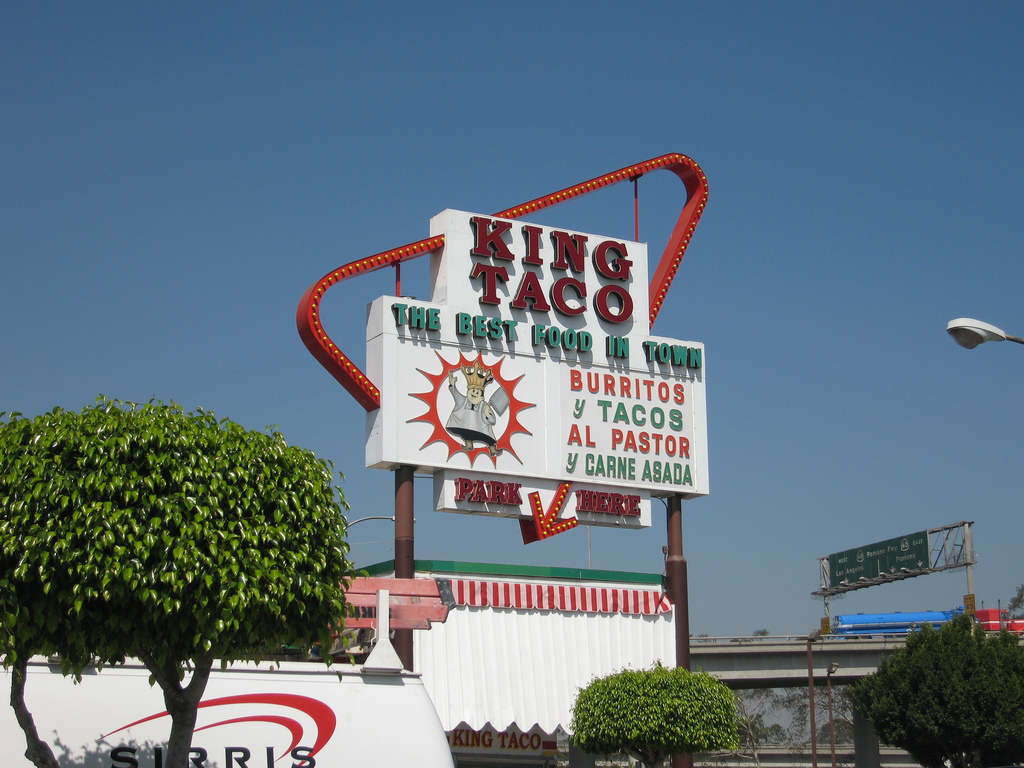
King Taco restaurant on 3rd Street in East Los Angeles

King Taco is a fast food restaurant chain headquartered in Los Angeles, California, which offers a variety of Mexican-inspired dishes. The chain was founded in 1974 by Raul Martinez, and since then, it has expanded to over 20 locations throughout Southern California.

== History ==
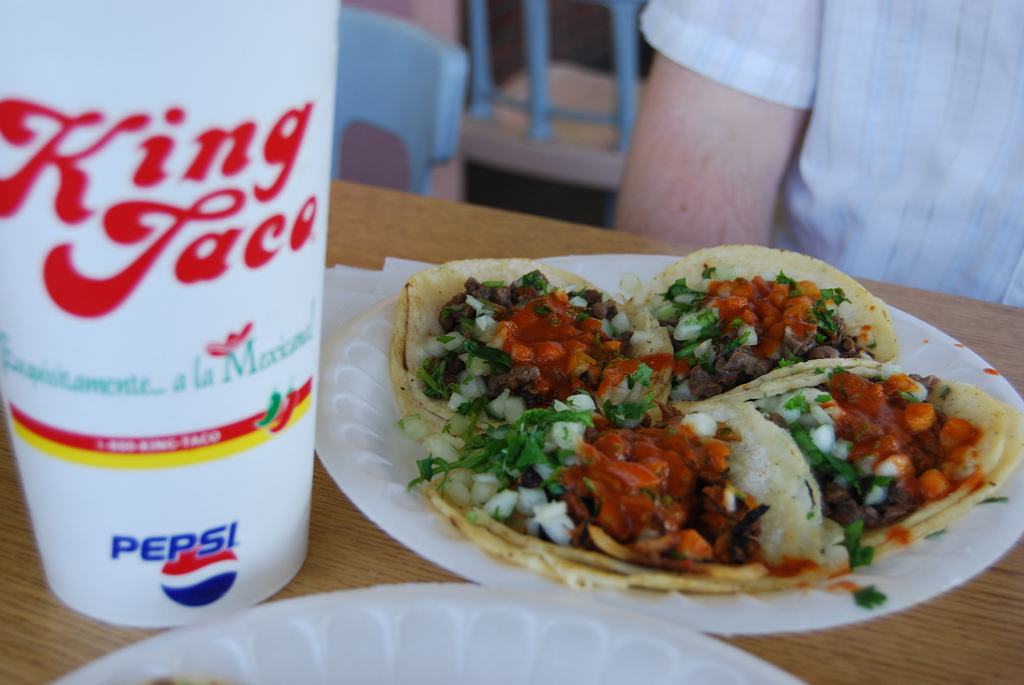
Carne asada tacos and horchata at King Taco.

King Taco was founded in 1974 by Raul Martínez, Sr., who operated a mobile lunch wagon out of a converted ice cream truck. Within six months, he opened the first of the chain's restaurants in Cypress Park. He opened the second King Taco somewhere in East Los Angeles, which at 4,000 square feet (370 m^{2}) is the flagship restaurant. Other locations soon followed, opening every other year in Commerce, Baldwin Park, El Monte and other East Los Angeles sites. By 1995, Martinez had established fourteen restaurants grossing over $21 million.

As of August 6, 2015, a grand opening was held at the new location in the heart of the city of Glendale, California, bringing the total to 23 restaurants that are now located throughout Los Angeles County and San Bernardino County. New restaurants have recently opened in Old Town Pasadena and Long Beach, which are among the few King Taco restaurants not located in a predominantly Mexican American neighborhood. The company has contributed to urban revitalization through the retrofitting of vacant commercial buildings for its restaurants. Additionally, King Taco has expanded into the Inland Empire, with restaurants in Ontario, California, and Fontana, California.

Company founder Raul Martinez Sr. died on December 3, 2013, at the age of 71 while visiting family in Mexico City.

== Sponsorships ==
In 2003, King Taco was the sponsor of the Champ Car season finale at the California Speedway. Called the King Taco 500, the race was eventually canceled as a result of the forest fires that devastated the Southern California area at the time.

For the 2019 Acura Grand Prix of Long Beach, King Taco was the primary sponsor on the Harding Steinbrenner #88 Honda/Dallara IR-18 IndyCar driven by rookie Colton Herta.

== Legal matters ==
King Taco Restaurant, Inc. filed a trademark infringement lawsuit against King Taco Express, Inc., Emmanuel Luna, and Sol Celene Rojas in the United States District Court for the District of Nevada in March 2008. King Taco Restaurant, Inc. won the lawsuit.

== See also ==
- List of Mexican restaurants
