= 2021 Star Nursery 150 =

Race details
- Race 7 of 9 in the 2021 ARCA Menards Series West season
- Date: September 23, 2021
- Location: Las Vegas Motor Speedway Bullring in Las Vegas, Nevada
- Course: Permanent racing facility
- Course length: 0.604 km (0.375 miles)
- Distance: 150 laps, 56.250 mi (90.526 km)
- Average speed: 64.47 miles per hour (103.75 km/h)

Pole position
Driver	Jake Drew	Sunrise Ford Racing
- Time: 15.017

Most laps led
Driver	Taylor Gray	David Gilliland Racing
- Laps: 123

Winner
No. 17	Taylor Gray	David Gilliland Racing

The 2021 Star Nursery 150 was a ARCA Menards Series West race held on September 23, 2021. It was contested over 150 laps on the 0.375-mile (0.604 km) short track oval. It was the seventh race of the 2021 ARCA Menards Series West season. David Gilliland Racing driver Taylor Gray, collected his second win of the season.

== Background ==
=== Entry list ===
- (R) denotes rookie driver.
- (i) denotes driver who is ineligible for series driver points.

No.	Driver	Team	Manufacturer
1	Jolynn Wilkinson	Bill McAnally Racing	Toyota
4	Eric Nascimento	Bill McAnally Racing	Toyota
5	Kyle Keller	Jerry Pitts Racing	Ford
6	Trevor Huddleston	Sunrise Ford Racing	Ford
7	Takuma Koga	Jerry Pitts Racing	Toyota
9	Jake Drew	Sunrise Ford Racing	Ford
13	Todd Souza	Central Coast Racing	Toyota
16	Jesse Love	Bill McAnally Racing	Toyota
17	Taylor Gray	David Gilliland Racing	Ford
17w	Amber Slagle	Steve McGowan Motorsports	Chevrolet
19	Amber Balcaen	Bill McAnally Racing	Toyota
21	Josh Fanolpoulos	Kart Idaho Racing	Toyota
27	Bobby Hillis Jr.	Hillis Racing	Chevrolet
31	Paul Pedroncelli	Pedroncelli Racing	Chevrolet
33	P.J. Pedroncelli	Pedroncelli Racing	Toyota
38	Stafford Smith	Kart Idaho Racing	Ford
42	Christian Rose	Cook-Finley Racing	Chevrolet
51	Dean Thompson	High Point Racing	Ford
54	Joey Iest	David Gilliland Racing	Ford
77	Mariah Boudrieau	Performance P-1 Motorsports	Toyota
88	Bridget Burgess	BMI Racing	Chevrolet
99	Cole Moore	Bill McAnally Racing	Toyota
Official entry list

== Practice/Qualifying ==
Practice and qualifying were combined into 1 75-minute session, where the fastest lap counted as the driver's qualifying lap. Jake Drew collected the pole with a time of 15.017 and a speed of 89.898 mph (144.677 km/h).

=== Starting Lineups ===
Pos	No	Driver	Team	Manufacturer	Time
1	9	Jake Drew	Sunrise Ford Racing	Ford	15.017
2	17	Taylor Gray	David Gilliland Racing	Ford	15.033
3	16	Jesse Love	Bill McAnally Racing	Toyota	15.054
4	6	Trevor Huddleston	Sunrise Ford Racing	Ford	15.059
5	51	Dean Thompson	Sunrise Ford Racing	Ford	15.098
6	54	Joey Iest	David Gilliland Racing	Ford	15.153
7	33	P. J. Pedroncelli	Pedroncelli Racing	Chevrolet	15.232
8	5	Kyle Keller	Jerry Pitts Racing	Ford	15.308
9	13	Todd Souza	Central Coast Racing	Toyota	15.322
10	99	Cole Moore	Bill McAnally Racing	Toyota	15.348
11	4	Eric Nascimento	Bill McAnally Racing	Toyota	15.387
12	17	Amber Slagle	Steve McGowan Motorsports	Chevrolet	15.389
13	88	Bridget Burgess	BMI Racing	Chevrolet	15.61
14	19	Amber Balcaen	Bill McAnally Racing	Toyota	15.682
15	7	Takuma Koga	Jerry Pitts Racing	Toyota	15.719
16	1	Jolynn Wilkinson	Bill McAnally Racing	Toyota	15.766
17	8	John Wood	Kart Idaho Racing	Chevrolet	15.78
18	42	Christian Rose	Cook-Finley Racing	Chevrolet	15.95
19	38	Stafford Smith	Kart Idaho Racing	Ford	16.025
20	27	Bobby Hillis Jr.	Hillis Racing	Chevrolet	16.213
21	77	Mariah Boudrieau	Performance P-1 Motorsports	Toyota	16.228
22	21	Josh Fanopoulos	Kart Idaho Racing	Toyota	16.262
23	31	Paul Pedroncelli	Pedroncelli Racing	Chevrolet	17.059
Official qualifying results

== Race ==
=== Race results ===
Pos	Grid	No	Driver	Team	Manufacturer	Laps	Points	Status
1	2	17	Taylor Gray	David Gilliland Racing	Ford	150	48	Running
2	1	9	Jake Drew	Sunrise Ford Racing	Ford	150	44	Running
3	4	6	Trevor Huddleston	Sunrise Ford Racing	Ford	150	41	Running
4	6	54	Joey Iest	David Gilliland Racing	Ford	150	40	Running
5	8	5	Kyle Keller	Jerry Pitts Racing	Ford	150	39	Running
6	10	99	Cole Moore	Bill McAnally Racing	Toyota	150	38	Running
7	7	33	P.J. Pedroncelli	Pedroncelli Racing	Chevrolet	149	37	Toyota
8	15	7	Takuma Koga	Jerry Pitts Racing	Toyota	149	36	Running
9	23	21	Josh Fanopoulos	Kart Idaho Racing	Toyota	149	35	Running
10	18	42	Christian Rose	Cook-Finley Racing	Toyota	148	34	Running
11	11	4	Eric Nascimento	Bill McAnally Racing	Toyota	147	33	Running
12	19	38	Stafford Smith	Kart Idaho Racing	Ford	146	32	Running
13	3	16	Jesse Love	Bill McAnally Racing	Toyota	146	32	Running
14	5	51	Dean Thompson	High Point Racing	Ford	145	30	Running
15	20	27	Bobby Hillis Jr.	Hillis Racing	Chevrolet	144	29	Running
16	9	13	Todd Souza	Central Coast Racing	Toyota	138	28	Running
17	16	1	Jolynn Wilkinson	Bill McAnally Racing	Toyota	127	27	Running
18	21	77	Mariah Boudrieau	Performance P-1 Motorsports	Toyota	112	26	Running
19	17	08	John Wood	Kart Idaho Racing	Chevrolet	69	25	Radiator
20	13	88	Bridget Burgess	BMI Racing	Chevrolet	55	24	Crash
21	12	17	Amber Slagle	Steve McGowan Motorsports	Toyota	53	23	Radiator
22	14	19	Amber Balcaen	Bill McAnally Racing	Toyota	20	22	Crash
23	23	31	Paul Pedroncelli	Pedroncelli Racing	Chevrolet	3	21	Brakes

Previous race: 2021 Portland 112	ARCA Menards Series West; 2021 season	Next race: 2021 NAPA Auto Care 150
