= 2021 NAPA Auto Parts 150 presented by Sunrise Ford =

2021 NAPA Auto Parts 150
Race details
- Race 5 of 9 in the 2021 ARCA Menards Series West season
- Date: August 21, 2021
- Location: Irwindale Speedway in Irwindale, California
- Course: Permanent racing facility
- Course length: 0.80 km (0.50 miles)
- Distance: 150 laps, 75.00 mi (120.70 km)
- Average speed: 63.662 miles per hour (102.454 km/h)

Pole position
Driver	P.J. Pedroncelli	Pedroncelli Racing
- Time: 18.424

Most laps led
Driver	Trevor Huddleston	Sunrise Ford Racing
- Laps: 87

Winner
No. 16	Jesse Love	Bill McAnally Racing

The 2021 NAPA Auto Parts 150 was a ARCA Menards Series West race held on August 21, 2021. It was contested over 153—extended from 150 laps due to an overtime finish—laps on the .50-mile (0.80 km) short track oval. It was the fifth race of the 2021 ARCA Menards Series West season. Bill McAnally Racing driver Jesse Love, collected his second win of the season.

== Background ==
=== Entry list ===
- (R) denotes rookie driver.
- (i) denotes driver who is ineligible for series driver points.

No.	Driver	Team	Manufacturer
4	Eric Nascimento	Bill McAnally Racing	Toyota
5	Sebastian Arias	Bill McAnally Racing	Toyota
6	Trevor Huddleston	Sunrise Ford Racing	Ford
7	Takuma Koga	Jerry Pitts Racing	Toyota
8	Johnny Borneman III	Borneman Motorsports	Ford
9	Jake Drew	Sunrise Ford Racing	Ford
13	Todd Souza	Central Coast Racing	Toyota
16	Jesse Love	Bill McAnally Racing	Toyota
19	Amber Balcaen	Bill McAnally Racing	Toyota
27	Bobby Hillis Jr.	Hillis Racing	Chevrolet
31	Paul Pedroncelli	Pedroncelli Racing	Chevrolet
33	P.J. Pedroncelli	Pedroncelli Racing	Toyota
38	Hiroyuki Ueno	Kart Idaho Racing	Ford
51	Ryan Partridge	High Point Racing	Ford
54	Joey Iest	David Gilliland Racing	Ford
77	Mariah Boudrieau	Performance P-1 Motorsports	Toyota
80	Brian Kamisky	Brian Kamisky Racing	Toyota
88	Bridget Burgess	BMI Racing	Chevrolet
99	Cole Moore	Bill McAnally Racing	Toyota
08	John Wood	Kart Idaho Racing	Chevrolet
Official entry list

== Practice/Qualifying ==
Practice and qualifying were combined into one single session, where the fastest recorded lap counts as a qualifying lap. P.J. Pedroncelli collected the pole with a time of 18.424 and a speed of 97.699 mph (157.231 km/h).

=== Starting Lineups ===
Pos	No	Driver	Team	Manufacturer	Time
1	33	P.J. Pedroncelli	Pedroncelli Racing	Toyota	18.424
2	16	Jesse Love	Bill McAnally Racing	Toyota	18.491
3	6	Trevor Huddleston	Sunrise Ford Racing	Ford	18.528
4	54	Joey Iest	David Gilliland Racing	Ford	18.624
5	9	Jake Drew	Sunrise Ford Racing	Ford	18.625
6	99	Cole Moore	Bill McAnally Racing	Toyota	18.627
7	4	Eric Nascimento	Bill McAnally Racing	Toyota	18.629
8	8	Johnny Borneman III	Borneman Motorsports	Ford	18.708
9	51	Ryan Partridge	High Point Racing	Ford	18.781
10	13	Todd Souza	Central Coast Racing	Ford	18.789
11	19	Amber Balcaen	Bill McAnally Racing	Toyota	19.020
12	7	Takuma Koga	Jerry Pitts Racing	Toyota	19.089
13	88	Bridget Burgess	BMI Racing	Chevrolet	19.284
14	5	Sebastian Arias	Bill McAnally Racing	Toyota	19.303
15	08	John Wood	Kart Idaho Racing	Chevrolet	19.543
16	80	Brian Kamisky	Brian Kamisky Racing	Toyota	19.572
17	77	Mariah Boudrieau	Performance P-1 Motorsports	Toyota	19.946
18	38	Hiroyuki Ueno	Kart Idaho Racing	Ford	20.047
19	27	Bobby Hillis Jr.	Hillis Racing	Chevrolet	20.525
20	31	Paul Pedroncelli	Pedroncelli Racing	Chevrolet	20.780
Official qualifying results

== Race ==
=== Race results ===
Pos	Grid	No	Driver	Team	Manufacturer	Laps	Points	Status
1	2	16	Jesse Love	Bill McAnally Racing	Toyota	153	47	Running
2	5	9	Jake Drew	Sunrise Ford Racing	Ford	153	42	Running
3	1	33	P.J. Pedroncelli	Pedroncelli Racing	Toyota	153	42	Running
4	4	54	Joey Iest	David Gilliland Racing	Ford	153	40	Running
5	9	51	Ryan Partridge	High Point Racing	Ford	153	39	Running
6	6	99	Cole Moore	Bill McAnally Racing	Toyota	153	38	Running
7	10	13	Todd Souza	Central Coast Racing	Toyota	153	37	Running
8	12	7	Takuma Koga	Jerry Pitts Racing	Toyota	153	36	Running
9	7	4	Eric Nascimento	Bill McAnally Racing	Toyota	151	35	Running
10	3	6	Trevor Huddleston	Sunrise Ford Racing	Ford	150	36	Running
11	11	19	Amber Balcaen	Bill McAnally Racing	Toyota	148	33	Running
12	19	27	Bobby Hillis Jr.	Hillis Racing	Chevrolet	148	32	Running
13	17	77	Mariah Boudrieau	Performance P-1 Motorsports	Toyota	144	31	Running
14	13	88	Bridget Burgess	BMI Racing	Chevrolet	142	30	Rear end
15	15	08	John Wood	Kart Idaho Racing	Chevrolet	142	29	Running
16	18	38	Hiroyuki Ueno	Kart Idaho Racing	Ford	137	28	Running
17	16	80	Brian Kamisky	Brian Kamisky Racing	Toyota	99	27	Crash
18	8	8	Johnny Borneman III	Borneman Motorsports	Ford	64	26	Brakes
19	20	31	Paul Pedroncelli	Pedroncelli Racing	Chevrolet	11	25	Brakes

Previous race: 2021 NAPA Auto Parts Colorado 150	ARCA Menards Series West; 2021 season	Next race: 2021 Portland 112
