= 2021 Portland 112 =

Race details
- Race 6 of 9 in the 2021 ARCA Menards Series West season
- Date: September 10, 2021
- Location: Portland International Raceway in Portland, Oregon
- Course: Permanent racing facility
- Course length: 3.19 km (1.98 miles)
- Distance: 50 laps, 99.00 mi (159.33 km)
- Average speed: 59.861 miles per hour (96.337 km/h)

Pole position
Driver	Jake Drew	Sunrise Ford Racing
- Time: 76.042

Most laps led
Driver	Jake Drew	Sunrise Ford Racing
- Laps: 29

Winner
No. 17	Taylor Gray	David Gilliland Racing

The 2021 Portland 112 was an ARCA Menards Series West race held on September 10, 2021. It was contested over 58—extended from 50 laps due to an overtime finish—laps on the 1.98-mile (3.19 km) road course. It was the sixth race of the 2021 ARCA Menards Series West season. David Gilliland Racing driver Taylor Gray, collected his first win of the season.

== Background ==
=== Entry list ===
- (R) denotes rookie driver.
- (i) denotes driver who is ineligible for series driver points.

No.	Driver	Team	Manufacturer
4	Eric Nascimento	Bill McAnally Racing	Toyota
6	Trevor Huddleston	Sunrise Ford Racing	Ford
7	Takuma Koga	Jerry Pitts Racing	Toyota
9	Jake Drew	Sunrise Ford Racing	Ford
13	Todd Souza	Central Coast Racing	Toyota
16	Jesse Love	Bill McAnally Racing	Toyota
17	Taylor Gray	David Gilliland Racing	Ford
27	Bobby Hillis Jr.	Hillis Racing	Chevrolet
31	Paul Pedroncelli	Pedroncelli Racing	Chevrolet
33	P.J. Pedroncelli	Pedroncelli Racing	Toyota
38	Dave Smith	Kart Idaho Racing	Ford
54	Joey Iest	David Gilliland Racing	Ford
68	Rodd Kneeland	Rodd Racing	Chevrolet
77	Caleb Costner	Performance P-1 Motorsports	Toyota
86	Tim Spurgeon	Spurgeon Motorsports	Chevrolet
88	Bridget Burgess	BMI Racing	Chevrolet
99	Cole Moore	Bill McAnally Racing	Toyota
08	Stafford Smith	Kart Idaho Racing	Ford
Official entry list

== Practice ==
Jake Drew was the fastest in practice with a time of 01:17.6 seconds and a speed of 91.266 mph (146.878 km/h).

Pos	No.	Driver	Team	Manufacturer	Time	Speed
1	9	Jake Drew	Sunrise Ford Racing	Ford	01:17.6	91.266
2	17	Taylor Gray	David Gilliland Racing	Ford	01:18.1	90.625
3	33	P.J. Pedroncelli	Pedroncelli Racing	Toyota	90.17	01:18.5
Official practice results

== Qualifying ==
Jake Drew collected the pole with a time of 76.042 and a speed of 93.122 mph (149.865 km/h).

=== Starting Lineups ===
Pos	No	Driver	Team	Manufacturer	Time
1	9	Jake Drew	Sunrise Ford Racing	Ford	01:16.0
2	33	P.J. Pedroncelli	Pedroncelli Racing	Toyota	01:17.3
3	17	Taylor Gray	David Gilliland Racing	Ford	01:17.3
4	4	Eric Nascimento	Bill McAnally Racing	Toyota	01:17.5
5	99	Cole Moore	Bill McAnally Racing	Toyota	01:17.8
6	13	Todd Souza	Central Coast Racing	Toyota	01:18.0
7	16	Jesse Love	Bill McAnally Racing	Toyota	01:18.3
8	6	Trevor Huddleston	Sunrise Ford Racing	Ford	01:18.3
9	7	Takuma Koga	Jerry Pitts Racing	Toyota	01:19.5
10	88	Bridget Burgess	BMI Racing	Chevrolet	01:19.6
11	86	Tim Spurgeon	Spurgeon Motorsports	Chevrolet	01:19.9
12	8	Stafford Smith	Kart Idaho Racing	Ford	01:20.2
13	68	Rodd Kneeland	Rodd Racing	Chevrolet	01:21.3
14	27	Bobby Hillis Jr.	Hillis Racing	Chevrolet	01:21.3
15	31	Paul Pedroncelli	Pedroncelli Racing	Chevrolet	01:27.9
16	54	Joey Iest	David Gilliland Racing	Ford	
17	77	Caleb Costner	Performance P-1 Motorsports	Toyota	
18	38	Dave Smith	Kart Idaho Racing	Ford	
Official qualifying results

== Race ==
=== Race results ===
Pos	Grid	No	Driver	Team	Manufacturer	Laps	Points	Status
1	3	17	Taylor Gray	David Gilliland Racing	Ford	58	47	Running
2	2	33	P.J. Pedroncelli	Pedroncelli Racing	Chevrolet	58	42	Running
3	7	16	Jesse Love	Bill McAnally Racing	Toyota	58	42	Running
4	16	54	Joey Iest	David Gilliland Racing	Ford	58	40	Running
5	9	7	Takuma Koga	Jerry Pitts Racing	Toyota	58	39	Running
6	11	86	Tim Spurgeon	Spurgeon Motorsports	Chevrolet	58	38	Running
7	8	6	Trevor Huddleston	Sunrise Ford Racing	Ford	58	37	Running
8	12	08	Stafford Smith	Kart Idaho Racing	Ford	58	36	Running
9	15	31	Paul Pedroncelli	Pedroncelli Racing	Chevrolet	58	35	Running
10	1	9	Jake Drew	Sunrise Ford Racing	Ford	58	37	Running
11	4	4	Eric Nascimento	Bill McAnally Racing	Toyota	58	33	Running
12	5	99	Cole Moore	Bill McAnally Racing	Toyota	58	33	Running
13	13	68	Rodd Kneeland	Rodd Racing	Chevrolet	58	31	Running
14	17	38	Dave Smith	Kart Idaho Racing	Toyota	57	30	Fuel
15	14	27	Bobby Hillis Jr.	Hillis Racing	Chevrolet	57	29	Running
16	10	88	Bridget Burgess	BMI Racing	Chevrolet	51	28	Running
17	6	13	Todd Souza	Central Coast Racing	Toyota	3	27	Fuel
18	18	77	Caleb Costner	Performance P-1 Motorsports	Toyota	0	3	Did Not Start

Previous race: 2021 NAPA Auto Parts 150 presented by Sunrise Ford	ARCA Menards Series West; 2021 season	Next race: 2021 Star Nursery 150
