= Tim Spurgeon =

American racing driver (born 1960)

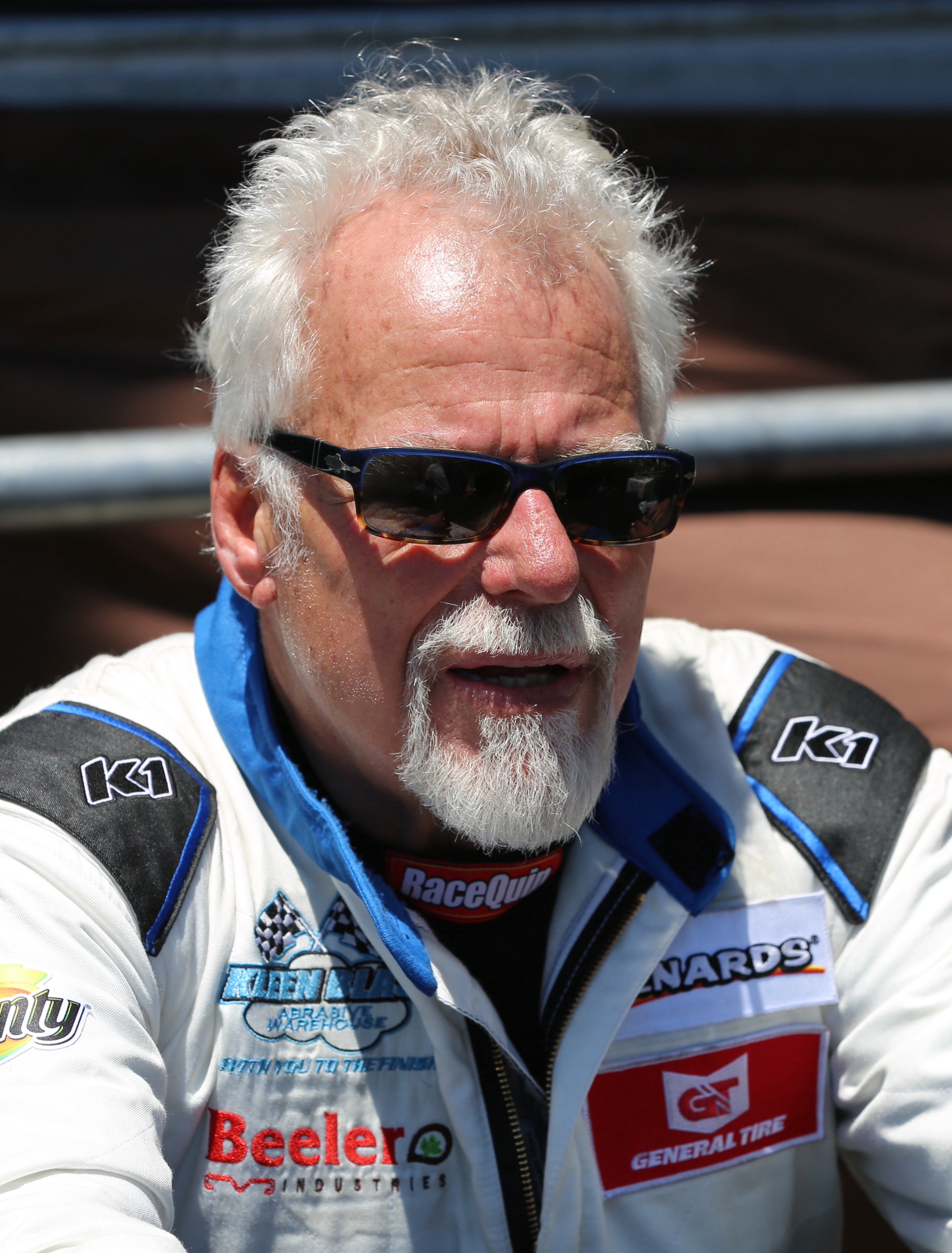
- Spurgeon at Sonoma Raceway in 2026
- Born: December 13, 1960 (age 65); Danville, California, U.S.

ARCA Menards Series career
- 1 race run over 1 year
- First race: 2022 General Tire 150 (Phoenix)
Wins	Top tens	Poles
0	0	0

ARCA Menards Series West career
- 21 races run over 14 years
- Best finish: 26th (2016)
- First race: 2010 Toyota/NAPA Auto Parts Bonus Challenge (Tooele)
- Last race: 2026 General Tire 150 (Sonoma)
Wins	Top tens	Poles
0	3	0
- Statistics up to date as of June 26, 2026.

Tim Spurgeon (born December 13, 1960) is an American professional stock car racing driver. He last competed part-time in the ARCA Menards Series West, driving the No. 86 Chevrolet for his family-owned team Spurgeon Motorsports.

== Racing career ==
=== ARCA Menards Series West ===
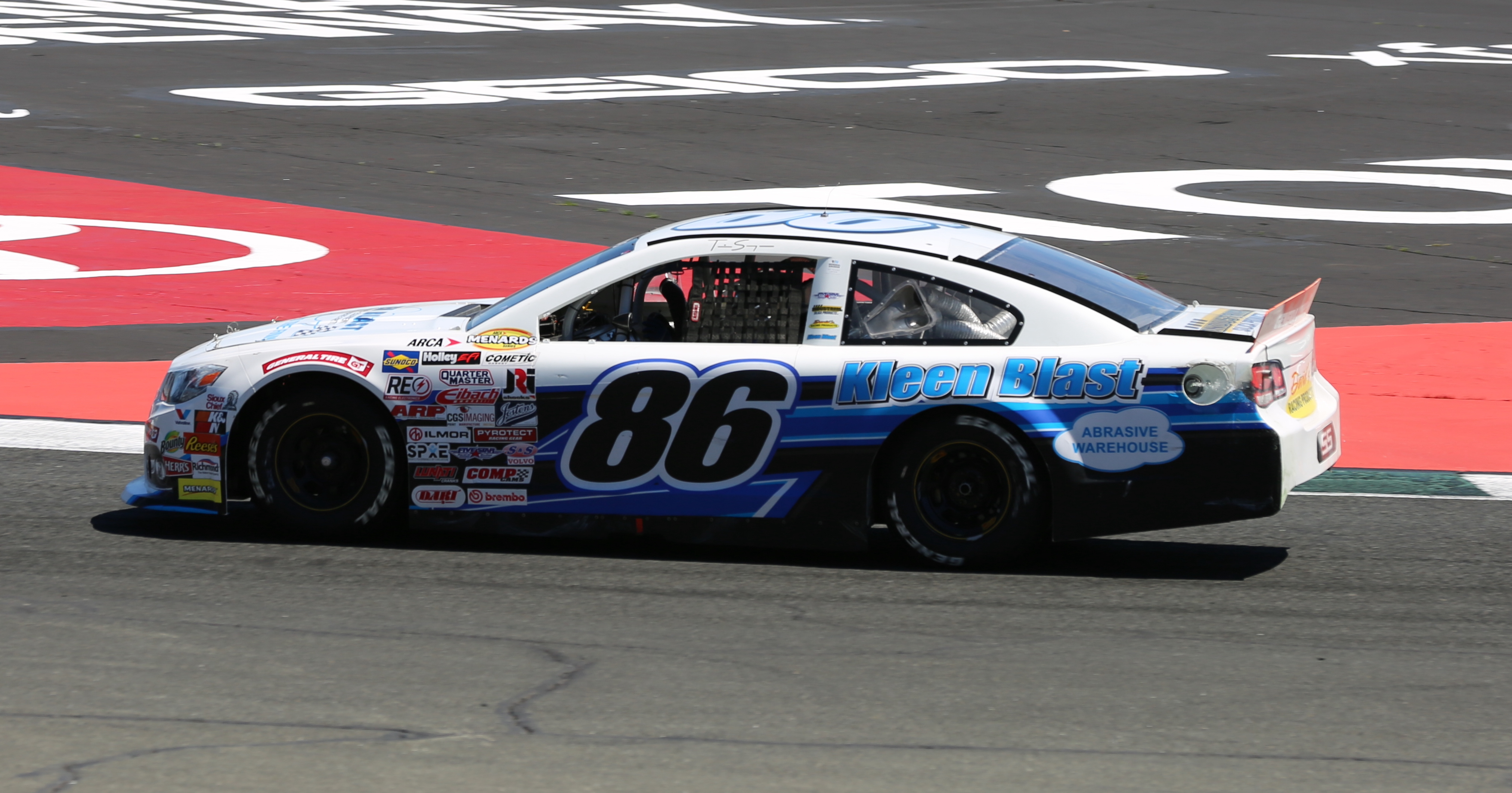
Spurgeon's No. 86 car at Sonoma Raceway in 2022.

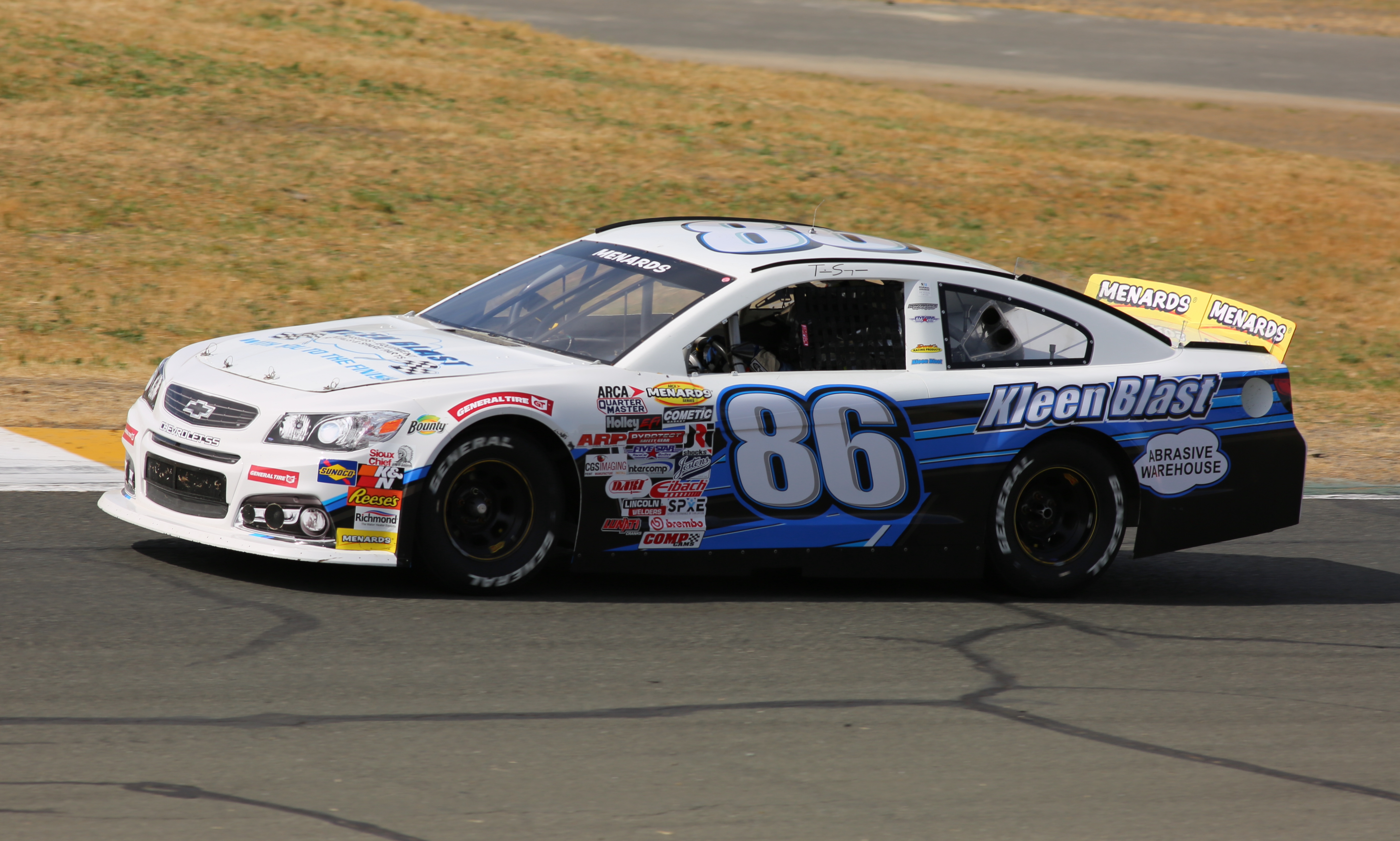
Spurgeon's No. 86 ARCA car at Sonoma in 2023

Spurgeon made his ARCA Menards Series debut in 2010 (then the NASCAR K&N Pro Series West) at the Utah Motorsports Campus. He finished 20th. Spurgeon returned to the series in 2012 running at Sonoma and Portland. In 2013, 2014, and 2015, Spurgeon ran once race each, all at Sonoma. His best finish was eleventh, in 2013. In 2016, Spurgeon ran three races, with one coming at Sonoma and two at Utah Motorsports Campus. In the first race at Utah, Spurgeon got his first career top-ten finish, eighth. Spurgeon ran one race in 2017 at Sonoma, finishing thirteenth. In 2018, Spurgeon ran at the Las Vegas Motor Speedway Dirt Track, his first ever oval race. However, he failed to finish due to an electrical issue. In 2019, he returned to Las Vegas and Sonoma, finishing eleventh at Sonoma. Spurgeon ran two races in 2021 at Sonoma and Portland, finishing fifteenth and sixth respectively. In 2022, Spurgeon ran the season-opening race at Phoenix Raceway, his first start on a paved oval. He finished nineteenth.

=== ARCA Menards Series ===
Spurgeon ran the 2022 General Tire 150, due to it being a combination race with the ARCA Menards Series West.

== Motorsports career results ==
=== ARCA Menards Series ===
(key) (Bold – Pole position awarded by qualifying time. Italics – Pole position earned by points standings or practice time. * – Most laps led. ** – All laps led.)

ARCA Menards Series results
Year	Team	No.	Make	1	2	3	4	5	6	7	8	9	10	11	12	13	14	15	16	17	18	19	20	AMSC	Pts	Ref
2022	Spurgeon Motorsports	86	Toyota	DAY	PHO; 19	TAL	KAN	CLT	IOW	BLN	ELK	MOH	POC	IRP	MCH	GLN	ISF	MLW	DSF	KAN	BRI	SLM	TOL	103rd	25	

==== ARCA Menards Series West ====
ARCA Menards Series West results
Year	Team	No.	Make	1	2	3	4	5	6	7	8	9	10	11	12	13	14	15	AMSWC	Pts	Ref
2010	Spurgeon Motorsports	86	Ford	AAS	PHO	IOW	DCS	SON	IRW	PIR	MRP	CNS	MMP; 20	AAS	PHO				68th	103	
2012	Spurgeon Motorsports	86	Ford	PHO	HAV	TOO	STO	IOW	BRA	LVS	SON; 25	EVE	COL	IOW	POR; 17	SAN	AAS	PHO	47th	46	
2013	Spurgeon Motorsports	86	Ford	PHO	S99	BIR	IOW	L44	SON; 11	CNS	IOW	EVG	SRP	MMP	SMP	AAS	KCR	PHO	56th	33	
2014	Spurgeon Motorsports	86	Ford	PHO	IRW	S99	IOW	KCR	SON; 13	SLS	CNS	IOW	EVG	KCR	MMP	AAS	PHO		66th	31	
2015	Spurgeon Motorsports	86	Ford	KCR	IRW	TUS	IOW	SHA	SON; 36	SLS	IOW	EVG	CNS	MER	AAS	PHO			74th	8	
2016	Spurgeon Motorsports	86	Chevy	IRW	KCR	TUS	OSS	CNS	SON; 12	SLS	IOW	EVG	DCS	UMC; 8	UMC; 18	MER	AAS		26th	94	
2017	Spurgeon Motorsports	86	Chevy	TUS	KCR	IRW	IRW	SPO	OSS	CNS	SON; 13	IOW	EVG	DCS	MER	AAS	KCR		50th	31	
2018	Spurgeon Motorsports	86	Toyota	KCR	TUS	TUS	OSS	CNS	SON	DCS	IOW	EVG	GTW	LVS; 19	MER	AAS	KCR		57th	25	
2019	Spurgeon Motorsports	86	Toyota	LVS; 18	IRW	TUS	TUS	CNS											33rd	59	
2019	Spurgeon Motorsports	86	Chevy						SON; 11	DCS	IOW	EVG	GTW	MER	AAS	KCR	PHO		33rd	59	
2021	Spurgeon Motorsports	86	Chevy	PHO	SON; 15	IRW	CNS	IRW	PIR; 6	LVS	AAS	PHO							28th	67	
2022	Spurgeon Motorsports	86	Toyota	PHO; 19	IRW; Wth	KCR	PIR												45th	60	
2022	Spurgeon Motorsports	86	Chevy					SON; 9	IRW	EVG	PIR	AAS	LVS	PHO					45th	60	
2023	Spurgeon Motorsports	86	Chevy	PHO	IRW	KCR	PIR	SON; 12	IRW										28th	64	
2023	Nascimento Motorsports	21	Toyota							SHA; 12	EVG	AAS	LVS	MAD	PHO				28th	64	
2024	David Racing	86	Chevy	PHO	KER	PIR	SON; 12	IRW	IRW	SHA	TRI	MAD	AAS	KER	PHO				54th	32	
2026	Spurgeon Motorsports	86	Chevy	KER	PHO	TUC	SHA	CNS	TRI	SON; 15	PIR	AAS	MAD	LVS	PHO	KER			67th	29	
