= 2021 General Tire 200 (Sonoma) =

Race details
- Race 2 of 9 in the 2021 ARCA Menards Series West season
- Date: June 5, 2021
- Location: Sonoma Raceway in Sonoma, California
- Course: Permanent racing facility
- Course length: 2.520 miles (4.056 km)
- Distance: 50 laps, 126.000 mi (202.777 km)
- Average speed: 65.138 miles per hour (104.829 km/h)

Pole position
Driver	Jake Drew	Sunrise Ford Racing
- Time: 1:141:848

Most laps led
Driver	Chase Briscoe	Stewart-Haas Racing
- Laps: 51

Winner
No. 14	Chase Briscoe	Stewart-Haas Racing

The 2021 General Tire 200 was a ARCA Menards Series West race held on June 5, 2021. It was contested over 51 laps—extended from 50 laps due to an overtime finish—on the 2.520-mile (4.056 km) road course. It was the second race of the 2021 ARCA Menards Series West season. Stewart-Haas Racing driver Chase Briscoe, running full-time in the NASCAR Cup Series, lead every lap en route to the victory.

== Background ==
=== Entry list ===
- (R) denotes rookie driver.
- (i) denotes driver who is ineligible for series driver points.

No.	Driver	Team	Manufacturer
4	Dylan Lupton	Bill McAnally Racing	Toyota
6	Trevor Huddleston	Sunrise Ford Racing	Ford
7	Takuma Koga	Jerry Pitts Racing	Toyota
9	Jake Drew	Sunrise Ford Racing	Ford
13	Todd Souza	Central Coast Racing	Ford
14	Chase Briscoe	Stewart-Haas Racing	Ford
16	Jesse Love	Bill McAnally Racing	Toyota
17w	Zane Smith	Steve McGowan Motorsports	Chevrolet
19	Eric Nascimento	Bill McAnally Racing	Toyota
27	Bobby Hillis Jr.	Hillis Racing	Chevrolet
31	Paul Pedroncelli	Pedroncelli Racing	Chevrolet
33	P.J. Pedroncelli	Pedroncelli Racing	Chevrolet
42	Tony Toste	Cook-Finley Racing	Toyota
51	Dean Thompson	High Point Racing	Ford
52	Ryan Philpott	Philpott Race Cars	Chevrolet
54	Joey Iest	David Gilliland Racing	Ford
68	Rodd Kneeland	Rodd Racing	Chevrolet
77	Dave Smith	Performance P-1 Motorsports	Toyota
80	Brian Kamisky	Brian Kamisky Racing	Chevrolet
86	Tim Spurgeon	Spurgeon Motorsports	Chevrolet
88	Bridget Burgess	BMI Racing	Chevrolet
99	Cole Moore	Bill McAnally Racing	Toyota
Official entry list

== Practice/Qualifying ==
Practice and qualifying were combined into 1 1-hour long session, where the fastest recorded lap counts as a qualifying lap. Cole Moore collected the pole with a time of 1:41:848 and a speed of 89.074 mph (143.351 km/h).

=== Starting Lineups ===
Pos	No	Driver	Team	Manufacturer	Time
1	9	Jake Drew	Sunrise Ford Racing	Ford	1:41:848
2	13	Todd Souza	Central Coast Racing	Ford	1:41.873
3	14	Chase Briscoe	Stewart-Haas Racing	Ford	1:42.291
4	17	Zane Smith	Steve McGowan Motorsports	Chevrolet	1:42.381
5	54	Joey Iest	David Gilliland Racing	Ford	1:42.622
6	4	Dylan Lupton	Bill McAnally Racing	Toyota	01:42.7
7	19	Eric Nascimento	Bill McAnally Racing	Toyota	01:43.1
8	16	Jesse Love	Bill McAnally Racing	Toyota	01:43.1
9	88	Bridget Burgess	BMI Racing	Chevrolet	01:43.9
10	99	Cole Moore	Bill McAnally Racing	Toyota	01:44.0
11	80	Brian Kamisky	Brian Kamisky Racing	Chevrolet	01:44.1
12	6	Trevor Huddleston	Sunrise Ford Racing	Ford	01:44.3
13	51	Dean Thompson	High Point Racing	Ford	01:44.4
14	33	P.J. Pedroncelli	Pedroncelli Racing	Chevrolet	01:44.6
15	77	Dave Smith	Performance P-1 Motorsports	Toyota	01:45.0
16	42	Tony Toste	Cook-Finley Racing	Toyota	01:45.6
17	86	Tim Spurgeon	Spurgeon Motorsports	Chevrolet	01:45.7
18	7	Takuma Koga	Jerry Pitts Racing	Toyota	01:46.7
19	68	Rodd Kneeland	Rodd Racing	Chevrolet	01:48.8
20	52	Ryan Philpott	Philpott Race Cars	Chevrolet	01:50.7
21	27	Bobby Hillis Jr.	Hillis Racing	Chevrolet	01:51.4
22	31	Paul Pedroncelli	Pedroncelli Racing	Chevrolet	01:52.5
Official qualifying results

== Race ==
=== Race results ===
Pos	Grid	No	Driver	Team	Manufacturer	Laps	Points	Status
1	3	14	Chase Briscoe	Stewart-Haas Racing	Ford	51	48	Running
2	6	4	Dylan Lupton	Bill McAnally Racing	Toyota	51	42	Running
3	14	33	P.J. Pedroncelli	Pedroncelli Racing	Chevrolet	51	41	Running
4	10	99	Cole Moore	Bill McAnally Racing	Toyota	51	40	Running
5	2	13	Todd Souza	Central Coast Racing	Ford	51	39	Running
6	13	51	Dean Thompson	High Point Racing	Ford	51	38	Running
7	1	9	Jake Drew	Sunrise Ford Racing	Ford	51	38	Running
8	9	88	Bridget Burgess	BMI Racing	Chevrolet	51	36	Running
9	20	52	Ryan Philpott	Philpott Race Cars	Chevrolet	51	35	Running
10	21	27	Bobby Hillis Jr.	Hillis Racing	Chevrolet	51	34	Running
11	18	7	Takuma Koga	Jerry Pitts Racing	Toyota	51	33	Running
12	12	6	Trevor Huddleston	Sunrise Ford Racing	Ford	51	32	Running
13	22	31	Paul Pedroncelli	Pedroncelli Racing	Chevrolet	51	31	Running
14	7	19	Eric Nascimento	Bill McAnally Racing	Toyota	42	30	Mechanical
15	17	86	Tim Spurgeon	Spurgeon Motorsports	Chevrolet	38	29	Crash
16	11	80	Brian Kamisky	Brian Kamisky Racing	Chevrolet	37	28	Crash
17	15	77	Dave Smith	Performance P-1 Motorsports	Toyota	36	27	Crash
18	16	42	Tony Toste	Cook-Finley Racing	Toyota	29	25	Mechanical
19	8	16	Jesse Love	Bill McAnally Racing	Toyota	29	25	Mechanical
20	5	54	Joey Iest	David Gilliland Racing	Ford	6	24	Engine
21	4	17	Zane Smith	Steve McGowan Motorsports	Chevrolet	0	23	Oil Line
22	19	68	Rodd Kneeland	Rodd Racing	Chevrolet	0	22	Clutch

Previous race: 2021 General Tire 150 (Phoenix)	ARCA Menards Series West; 2021 season	Next race: 2021 NAPA Auto Parts 150 presented by the West Coast Stock Car Hall of Fame
