= 2021 General Tire 200 =

2021 General Tire 200 may refer to:

- 2021 General Tire 200 (Talladega), the ARCA Menards Series race
- 2021 General Tire 200 (Sonoma), the ARCA Menards Series West race
