= 2021 NAPA Auto Care 150 =

Race details
- Race 8 of 9 in the 2021 ARCA Menards Series West season
- Date: October 9, 2021
- Location: All-American Speedway in Roseville, California
- Course: Permanent racing facility
- Course length: 0.536 km (0.333 miles)
- Distance: 150 laps, 49.95 mi (73.95 km)
- Average speed: 43.294 miles per hour (69.675 km/h)

Pole position
Driver	Dean Thompson	High Point Racing
- Time: 13.768

Most laps led
Driver	Cole Moore	Bill McAnally Racing
- Laps: 79

Winner
No. 33	P. J. Pedroncelli	Pedroncelli Racing

The 2021 NAPA Auto Care 150 was a ARCA Menards Series West race held on October 9, 2021. It was contested over 158 laps—extended from 150 laps due to an overtime finish—on the 0.33-mile (0.53 km) short track oval. It was the eighth race of the 2021 ARCA Menards Series West season. Pedroncelli Racing driver P. J. Pedroncelli, collected his first win of the season, and of his career.

== Background ==
=== Entry list ===
- (R) denotes rookie driver.
- (i) denotes driver who is ineligible for series driver points.

No.	Driver	Team	Manufacturer
1	Jolynn Wilkinson	Bill McAnally Racing	Toyota
6	Trevor Huddleston	Sunrise Ford Racing	Ford
7	Takuma Koga	Jerry Pitts Racing	Toyota
9	Jake Drew	Sunrise Ford Racing	Ford
11	Andrew Tuttle	Kart Idaho Racin	Ford
13	Todd Souza	Central Coast Racing	Toyota
16	Jesse Love	Bill McAnally Racing	Toyota
17	Taylor Gray	David Gilliland Racing	Ford
17w	Amber Slagle	Steve McGowan Motorsports	Chevrolet
21	Josh Fanolpoulos	Kart Idaho Racing	Ford
27	Bobby Hillis Jr.	Hillis Racing	Chevrolet
31	Paul Pedroncelli	Pedroncelli Racing	Chevrolet
33	P.J. Pedroncelli	Pedroncelli Racing	Toyota
38	Stafford Smith	Kart Idaho Racing	Ford
42	Christian Rose	Cook-Finley Racing	Toyota
51	Dean Thompson	High Point Racing	Ford
54	Joey Iest	David Gilliland Racing	Ford
77	Caleb Costner	Performance P-1 Motorsports	Toyota
78	Travis Milburn	Velocity Racing	Ford
80	Brian Kamisky	Brian Kamisky Racing	Toyota
88	Bridget Burgess	BMI Racing	Chevrolet
99	Cole Moore	Bill McAnally Racing	Toyota
08	John Wood	Kart Idaho Racing	Ford
Official entry list

== Practice/Qualifying ==
Practice and qualifying were combined into 1 75-minute session, where the fastest lap counted as the driver's qualifying lap. Dean Thompson collected the pole with a time of 13.768 and a speed of 13.769 mph (22.159 km/h).

=== Starting Lineups ===
Pos	No	Driver	Team	Manufacturer	Time
1	51	Dean Thompson	High Point Racing	Ford	13.768
2	16	Jesse Love	Bill McAnally Racing	Toyota	13.769
3	17	Taylor Gray	David Gilliland Racing	Ford	13.789
4	99	Cole Moore	Bill McAnally Racing	Toyota	13.819
5	9	Jake Drew	Sunrise Ford Racing	Ford	13.824
6	54	Joey Iest	David Gilliland Racing	Ford	13.841
7	78	Travis Milburn	Kart Idaho Racing	Toyota	13.852
8	6	Trevor Huddleston	Sunrise Ford Racing	Ford	13.857
9	33	P. J. Pedroncelli	Pedroncelli Racing	Chevrolet	13.875
10	13	Todd Souza	Central Coast Racing	Toyota	14.067
11	17	Amber Slagle	Steve McGowan Motorsports	Chevrolet	14.103
12	1	Jolynn Wilkinson	Bill McAnally Racing	Toyota	14.12
13	42	Christian Rose	Cook-Finley Racing	Toyota	14.153
14	21	Josh Fanopoulos	Kart Idaho Racing	Toyota	14.185
15	38	Stafford Smith	Kart Idaho Racing	Ford	14.232
16	88	Bridget Burgess	BMI Racing	Chevrolet	14.246
17	7	Takuma Koga	Jerry Pitts Racing	Toyota	14.265
18	80	Brian Kamisky	Brian Kamisky Racing	Toyota	14.273
19	08	John Wood	Kart Idaho Racing	Chevrolet	14.328
20	77	Caleb Costner	Performance P-1 Motorsports	Toyota	14.473
21	31	Paul Pedroncelli	Pedroncelli Racing	Chevrolet	15.354
22	27	Bobby Hillis Jr.	Hillis Racing	Toyota	15.774
23	11	Andrew Tuttle	Kart Idaho Racing	Ford	15.919
Official qualifying results

== Race ==
=== Race results ===
Pos	Grid	No	Driver	Team	Manufacturer	Laps	Points	Status
1	9	33	P. J. Pedroncelli	Pedroncelli Racing	Chevrolet	158	47	Running
2	6	54	Joey Iest	David Gilliland Racing	Ford	158	43	Running
3	8	6	Trevor Huddleston	Sunrise Ford Racing	Ford	158	41	Running
4	10	13	Todd Souza	Central Coast Racing	Toyota	158	40	Running
5	4	99	Cole Moore	Bill McAnally Racing	Toyota	158	41	Running
6	15	38	Stafford Smith	Kart Idaho Racing	Ford	158	38	Running
7	13	42	Christian Rose	Cook-Finley Racing	Toyota	158	37	Toyota
8	5	9	Jake Drew	Sunrise Ford Racing	Ford	158	37	Running
9	17	7	Takuma Koga	Jerry Pitts Racing	Toyota	158	35	Running
10	11	17	Amber Slagle	Steve McGowan Motorsports	Chevrolet	158	34	Running
11	16	88	Bridget Burgess	BMI Racing	Chevrolet	158	33	Running
12	2	16	Jesse Love	Bill McAnally Racing	Toyota	157	33	Running
13	18	80	Brian Kamisky	Brian Kamisky Racing	Toyota	156	31	Running
14	20	77	Caleb Costner	Performance P-1 Motorsports	Toyota	156	30	Running
15	12	1	Jolynn Wilkinson	Bill McAnally Racing	Toyota	156	29	Running
16	23	11	Andrew Tuttle	Kart Idaho Racing	Chevrolet	155	28	Running
17	1	51	Dean Thompson	High Point Racing	Chevrolet	154	28	Running
18	22	27	Bobby Hillis Jr.	Hillis Racing	Toyota	152	26	Running
19	19	08	John Wood	Kart Idaho Racing	Chevrolet	147	25	Running
20	7	78	Travis Milburn	Kart Idaho Racing	Toyota	128	24	Crash
21	14	21	Josh Fanopoulos	Kart Idaho Racing	Toyota	47	23	Crash
22	3	17	Taylor Gray	David Gilliland Racing	Ford	46	22	Crash
23	21	31	Paul Pedroncelli	Pedroncelli Racing	Chevrolet	2	21	Vibration

Previous race: 2021 Star Nursery 150	ARCA Menards Series West; 2021 season	Next race: 2021 Arizona Lottery 100
