= 2021 ARCA Menards Series West =

68th season of the ARCA Menards Series West

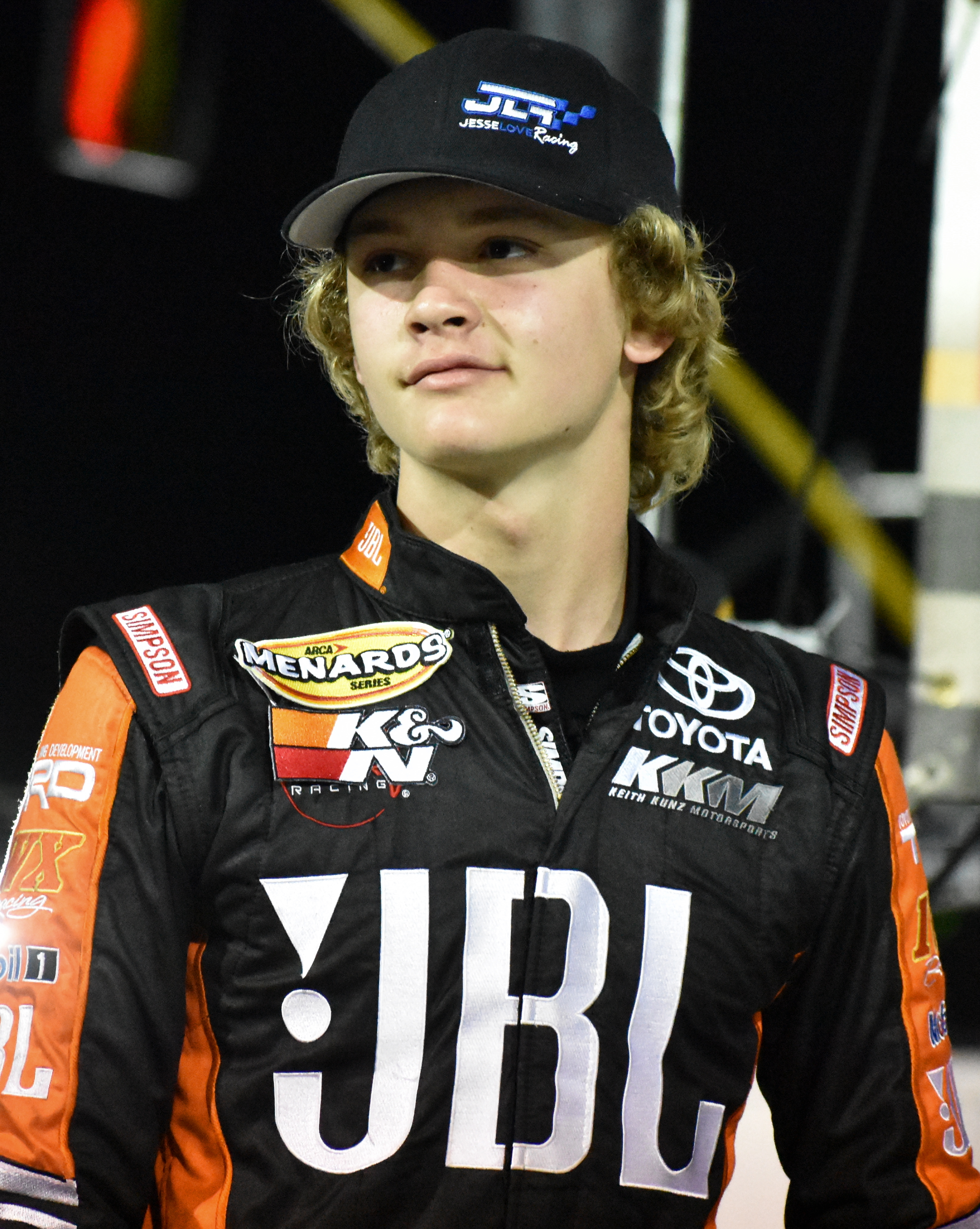
Jesse Love, the 2021 ARCA Menards Series West champion.

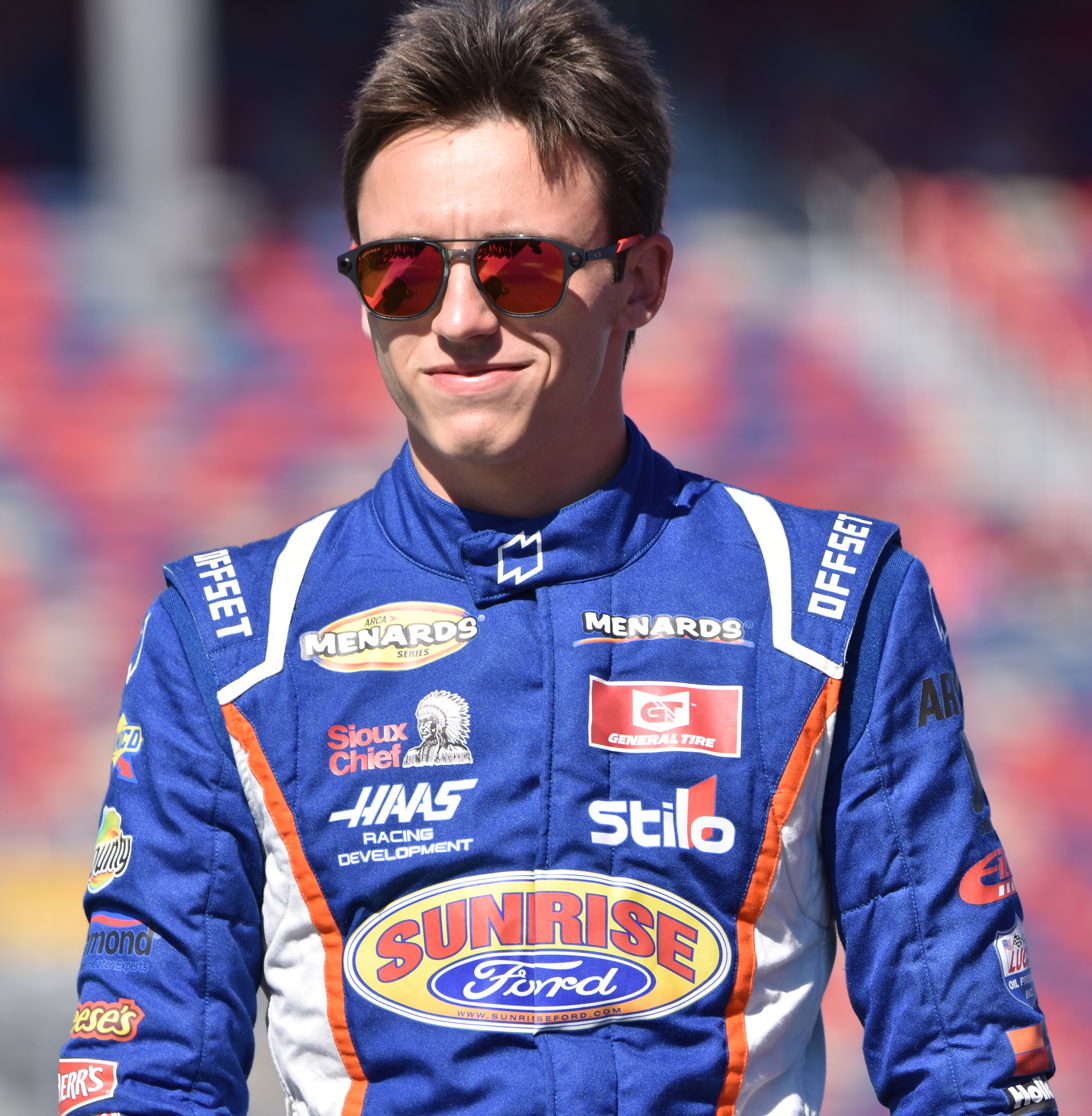
Jake Drew lost the tiebreaker over Love.

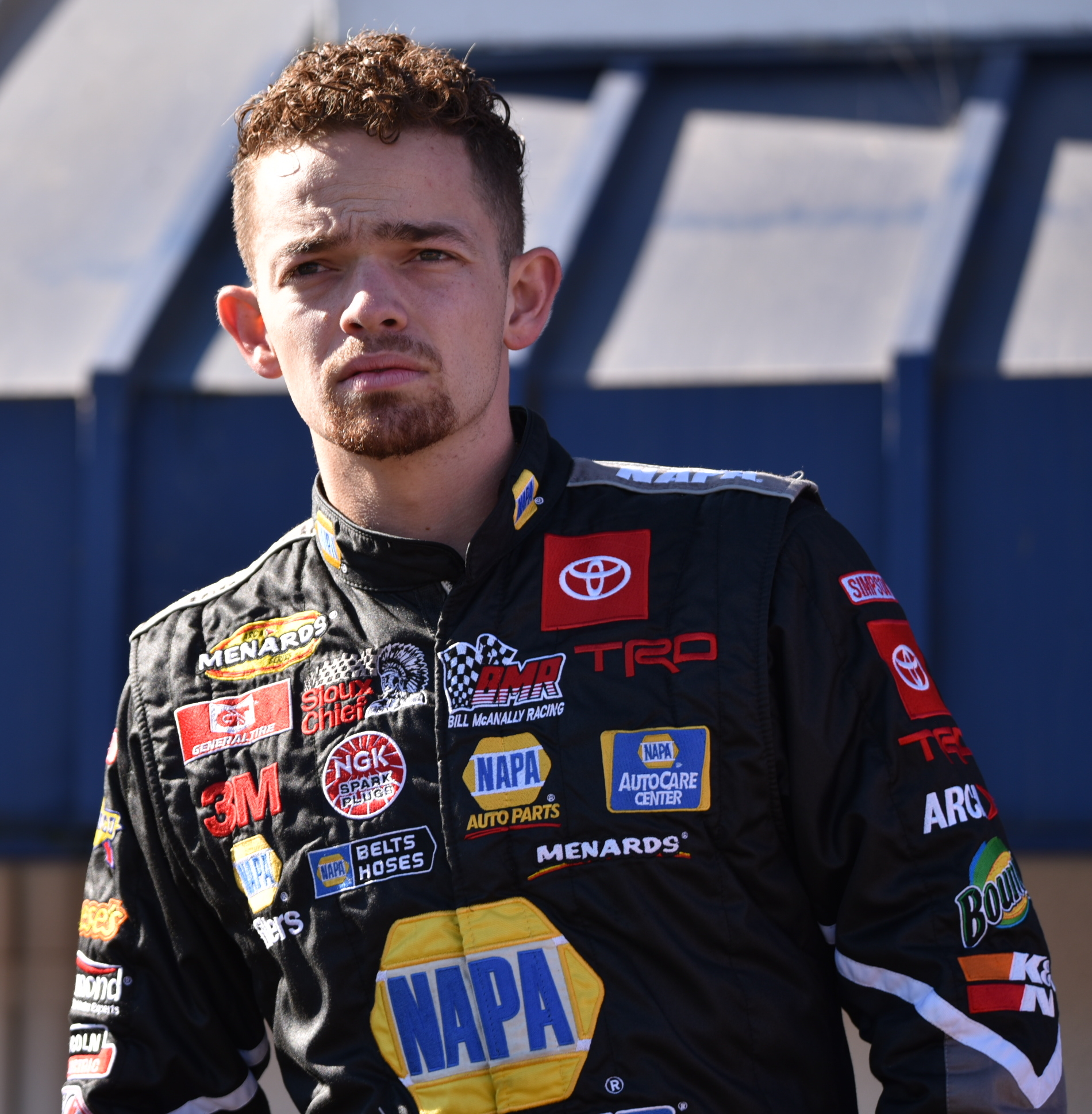
Cole Moore finished third in the final standings.

The 2021 ARCA Menards Series West was the sixty-eighth season of the ARCA Menards Series West, a regional stock car racing series sanctioned by NASCAR in the United States. The season began at Phoenix Raceway with the General Tire 150 and ended with another race at Phoenix Raceway, the Arizona Lottery 100, on November 6.

== Teams and drivers ==
=== Complete schedule ===
Manufacturer	Team	No.	Driver	Crew chief
Chevrolet	BMI Racing	88	Bridget Burgess	Sarah Burgess
Ford	Naake-Klauer Motorsports	54	Joey Iest	Mike Naake
Ford	Sunrise Ford Racing	6	Trevor Huddleston	Bill Sedgwick
Ford	Sunrise Ford Racing	9	Jake Drew (R)	Jeff Schrader
Toyota	Bill McAnally Racing	16	Jesse Love	Travis Sharpe 8 John Camilleri 1
Toyota	Bill McAnally Racing	99	Cole Moore (R)	Mario Isola
Toyota	Jerry Pitts Racing	7	Takuma Koga	Jerry Pitts
Toyota	Performance P-1 Motorsports	77	Tony Toste 1	Dave McKenzie
Toyota	Performance P-1 Motorsports	77	Dave Smith 1	Dave McKenzie
Toyota	Performance P-1 Motorsports	77	Nick Joanides 1	Dave McKenzie
Toyota	Performance P-1 Motorsports	77	Mariah Boudrieau 3	Dave McKenzie
Toyota	Performance P-1 Motorsports	77	Caleb Costner 2	Dave McKenzie
Toyota	Performance P-1 Motorsports	77	Ryan Roulette 1	Dave McKenzie
Ford 3 Toyota 6	Central Coast Racing	13	Todd Souza	Michael Muñoz
Chevrolet 7 Toyota 2	Hillis Racing	27	Bobby Hillis Jr.	Ed Ash
Toyota 7 Chevrolet 2	Pedroncelli Racing	33	P. J. Pedroncelli	Ty Joiner

=== Limited schedule ===
Manufacturer	Team	No.	Driver	Crew chief	Rounds
Chevrolet	Brad Smith Motorsports	48	Brad Smith	Kevin Schwarze	1
Chevrolet	Fast Track Racing	01	Bryce Haugeberg	Kevin Cram	1
Chevrolet	Fast Track Racing	12	D. L. Wilson	Dick Doheny	1
Chevrolet	GMS Racing	21	Jack Wood	Chad Bryant	1
Chevrolet	GMS Racing	22	Daniel Dye	Chad Bryant	1
Chevrolet	Kart Idaho Racing	11	Andrew Tuttle (Note: Chris Lowden was initially entered in the car, but was replaced by Tuttle for the race.)	Tony Jackson	1
Chevrolet	Pedroncelli Racing	31	Paul Pedroncelli	Mike Regelman 2 Rodd Kneeland 6	8
Chevrolet	Philpott Race Cars	52	Ryan Philpott	Chuck Dozhier	1
Chevrolet	Rev Racing	2	Nick Sanchez	Steve Plattenberger	2
Chevrolet	Rev Racing	66	Rajah Caruth	Glenn Parker	1
Chevrolet	Richmond Clubb Motorsports	27	Tim Richmond	Alex Clubb	1
Chevrolet	Rodd Racing	68	Rodd Kneeland	Chris Drysdale	2
Chevrolet	RSS Racing	28	Kyle Sieg	Jeff Green	1
Chevrolet	Spurgeon Motorsports	86	Tim Spurgeon	Mike David	2
Chevrolet	Steve McGowan Motorsports	17	Zane Smith	Bruce Cook 1 Sean Samuels 5	2
Chevrolet	Steve McGowan Motorsports	17	Amber Slagle	Bruce Cook 1 Sean Samuels 5	3
Chevrolet	Steve McGowan Motorsports	17	Conner Jones	Bruce Cook 1 Sean Samuels 5	1
Chevrolet	Young's Motorsports	02	Toni Breidinger	Ryan London	1
Ford	Borneman Motorsports	8	Johnny Borneman III	Tony Caputo	3
Ford	David Gilliland Racing	17	Taylor Gray	Chad Johnston	4
Ford	David Gilliland Racing	45	Jake Garcia	Mike Hillman Jr.	1
Ford	David Gilliland Racing	46	Thad Moffitt	Derek Smith	1
Ford	David Gilliland Racing	46	J. P. Bergeron	Derek Smith	1
Ford	David Gilliland Racing	71	Taylor Gray	Chad Johnston	1
Ford	Fast Track Racing	10	Mark Lowrey	Jeff McClure	1
Ford	High Point Racing (Note: Entries were fielded in collaboration with Sunrise Ford Racing.)	51	Dean Thompson (R)	Travis Thirkettle	7
Ford	High Point Racing	51	Ryan Partridge	Travis Thirkettle	1
Ford	Jerry Pitts Racing	5	Kyle Keller	Charlie Wilson	1
Ford	Rette Jones Racing	30	Max Gutiérrez	Mark Rette	1
Ford	Stewart-Haas Racing	14	Chase Briscoe	Johnny Klausmeier	1
Toyota	Bill McAnally Racing	1	Jolynn Wilkinson	Mario Isola 1 John Camilleri 1	2
Toyota	Bill McAnally Racing	4	Dylan Lupton	J. R. Norris	1
Toyota	Bill McAnally Racing	5	Sebastian Arias	Gary Collins	1
Toyota	Bill McAnally Racing	19	Derek Kraus	John Camilleri 6 Mike Nascimento 1	1
Toyota	Bill McAnally Racing	19	Eric Nascimento (Note: Entry was fielded in collaboration with Nascimento Motorsports.)	John Camilleri 6 Mike Nascimento 1	1
Toyota	Bill McAnally Racing	19	Amber Balcaen	John Camilleri 6 Mike Nascimento 1	3
Toyota	Bill McAnally Racing	19	Jolynn Wilkinson	John Camilleri 6 Mike Nascimento 1	1
Toyota	Bill McAnally Racing	19	Sebastian Arias	John Camilleri 6 Mike Nascimento 1	1
Toyota	Cook-Finley Racing (Note: Entries were fielded in collaboration with Steve McGowan Motorsports.)	42	Tony Toste	Amber Slagle	1
Toyota	Cook-Finley Racing	42	Christian Rose	Evan Bertone	2
Toyota	Fast Track Racing	11	Richard Garvie	Steven Barton	1
Toyota	Joe Gibbs Racing	18	Ty Gibbs	Mark McFarland	2
Toyota	Joe Gibbs Racing	81	Sammy Smith	Mark McFarland	1
Toyota	Nascimento Motorsports	4	Eric Nascimento (Note: Entries were fielded in collaboration with Velocity Racing.)	Mike Nascimento	5
Toyota	Venturini Motorsports	15	Drew Dollar	Billy Venturini	2
Toyota	Venturini Motorsports	20	Corey Heim	Shannon Rursch	1
Toyota	Venturini Motorsports	20	Gracie Trotter	Dave Leiner Jr.	1
Toyota	Venturini Motorsports	25	Gracie Trotter	Kevin Reed	1
Toyota	Venturini Motorsports	25	Parker Chase	Kevin Reed	1
Toyota	Venturini Motorsports	55	Toni Breidinger	Shannon Rursch	1
Toyota	Velocity Racing (Note: Entries were fielded in collaboration with Kart Idaho Racing.)	78	Travis Milburn	Roger Bracken	2
Chevrolet 5 Ford 1 Toyota 1	Kart Idaho Racing	08	Josh Fanopoulos	Joe Daley	1
Chevrolet 5 Ford 1 Toyota 1	Kart Idaho Racing	08	John Wood	Jeremiah Clever	4
Chevrolet 5 Ford 1 Toyota 1	Kart Idaho Racing	08	Stafford Smith	Mike Holleran	1
Chevrolet 5 Ford 1 Toyota 1	Kart Idaho Racing	08	Caleb Costner	Unknown	1
Chevrolet 1 Toyota 3	Kart Idaho Racing	21	Josh Fanopoulos	Joe Daley 1 John Wood 1 Dennis Wurtz 1 Unknown 1	4
Ford 5 Toyota 1	Kart Idaho Racing	38	Hiroyuki Ueno	Mike Holleran	3
Ford 5 Toyota 1	Kart Idaho Racing	38	Dave Smith	Unknown	1
Ford 5 Toyota 1	Kart Idaho Racing	38	Stafford Smith	Mike Holleran	2
Chevrolet 1 Toyota 3	Legal Limit Motorsports	80	Brian Kamisky	Derrick Copeland	4

=== Changes ===
==== Teams ====
- On December 16, 2020, it was revealed in an article on the ARCA website that Bridget Burgess would attempt to run the full season in the West Series in 2021. She ran most of the races in 2020 (all of them except the doubleheader at UMC).
- On January 4, 2021, Bill McAnally Racing announced their 2021 driver lineup, with defending series champion Jesse Love moving from the closed No. 19 car to the No. 16, replacing Gio Scelzi, and rookie Cole Moore driving the No. 20 (it would later be changed to the No. 99). The team cut back from 4 full-time cars to 2 in 2021, which left Scelzi and Holley Hollan (who drove the closed No. 50 car) without rides in 2021. They also had a 5th full-time car to start the 2020 season, the No. 12 of Lawless Alan, which was closed down mid-season. Gracie Trotter, who drove the No. 99 in 2020, left the team to move up to the main ARCA Series in 2021, driving for Venturini Motorsports.
- On February 2, 2021, it was announced that High Point Racing, a late model racing team in the Spears Southwest Tour, would expand to the West Series in 2021, fielding the No. 51 for rookie Dean Thompson, their driver in that series in 2020. They formed an alliance with Sunrise Ford Racing to help get their new team off the ground.
- Stewart-Haas Racing returned to the series for the race at Sonoma to field a car for Chase Briscoe, their Cup Series driver, in preparation for Briscoe's first Cup Series start at the track the next day. In the race, the team used a Ford that was owned by Chad Bryant, the former owner of Chad Bryant Racing who closed his team down and merged it into GMS Racing where he became a crew chief.

==== Drivers ====
- On November 2, 2020, it was announced that Jack Wood, who drove part-time in the West Series in 2019 and 2020 for his own team, the No. 78 Toyota for Velocity Racing, would join GMS Racing to replace two-time consecutive East Series champion Sam Mayer in the team's No. 21 car, running full-time in the East Series as well as the Showdown races in the big ARCA Menards Series in 2021. Mayer moved up to the Xfinity Series in June 2021, driving for JR Motorsports after turning 18 and therefore becoming eligible to race in the series. Despite this, Velocity Racing would continue as a part-time team, and the team entered the last two races of the season with Travis Milburn driving the No. 78 car in a collaboration with Kart Idaho Racing, the team he previously drove for.
- On January 18, 2021, it was announced that Blaine Perkins, who drove the No. 9 for Sunrise Ford Racing in 2020 and finished second in the standings, would move up to the Xfinity Series in 2021, driving part-time for Our Motorsports. Rookie driver Jake Drew replaced Perkins in the SFR No. 9.
- On January 20, 2021, it was announced that Takuma Koga, who drove the No. 77 for Performance P-1 Motorsports in 2019 and 2020, would be moving to Jerry Pitts Racing in 2021 to drive their No. 7 in 2021.
- On May 14, 2021, it was announced that former JR Motorsports late model racing driver Adam Lemke would make his stock car debut in 2021, competing in select main ARCA Series, East Series, and West Series races for Rette Jones Racing. (Lemke would end up only running 1 main ARCA Series race for the team and no West Series races,) even though ARCA East driver Max Gutiérrez would attempt the season finale at Phoenix for RJR.
- On March 2, 2021, it was announced that Tony Toste would return to the series full-time for the first time since 1998 and would drive for Performance P-1 Motorsports, replacing Koga in the team's No. 77. However, the deal fell apart after just 1 races, as Dave Smith, Nick Joanides, Mariah Boudrieau, Caleb Costner, and Ryan Roulette split the seat time for the rest of the season. Toste did run 1 more West Series race in 2021, which was at Sonoma where he drove the No. 42 for Cook-Finley Racing.
- On August 20, 2021, the day before the second race at Irwindale, Dean Thompson tested positive for COVID-19 and was replaced by Ryan Partridge for that race. Partridge, a former Sunrise Ford Racing driver, made his first start in the series since 2018. SFR has an alliance with Thompson's team, High Point Racing.

==== Crew chiefs ====
- On December 16, 2020, it was revealed in an article on the ARCA website that Sarah Burgess, the mother of Bridget Burgess who served as her crew chief in 2020, expressed an interest in stepping off the pit box if possible and potentially racing against her daughter in a West Series race in 2021. (This did not end up happening and Sarah Burgess crew chiefed Bridget in every race in 2021.)
- Both of the crew chiefs for Bill McAnally Racing's full-time cars were new in 2021, with Travis Sharpe crew chiefing Jesse Love's No. 16 and Mario Isola crew chiefing Cole Moore's No. 99. Also, Sharpe would miss the race at Sonoma and was replaced by John Camilleri, who crew chiefed the No. 19 in most races in 2021.
- After having 4 different crew chiefs in 2020, Performance P-1 Motorsports had another new crew chief in 2021, Dave McKenzie.

==== Manufacturers ====
- On December 16, 2020, it was revealed in an article on the ARCA website that Bridget Burgess would attempt to buy newer cars and equipment for her family team in 2021, which borrowed an old 2007 Toyota from Bill McAnally Racing for their starts in 2020. The team ran a Chevy in every race in 2021.
- On January 20, 2021, it was revealed in the announcement of Takuma Koga joining Jerry Pitts Racing that the team would be switching from Ford to Toyota in 2021. However, they would have a Ford entry for Kyle Keller at the LVMS Bullring.
- Todd Souza's No. 13 team ran both Fords and Toyotas after only running Toyotas in 2020.

== Schedule ==
Sonoma, Las Vegas, and Phoenix revealed their race dates ahead of the release of the entire schedule, which ARCA announced on December 18, 2020.

Note: The race at Phoenix in March was a combination race with the ARCA Menards Series (highlighted in gold).

No	Race title	Track	Date
1	General Tire 150	Phoenix Raceway, Avondale, Arizona	March 12
2	General Tire 200	Sonoma Raceway, Sonoma, California	June 5
3	NAPA Auto Parts 150 presented by the West Coast Stock Car Hall of Fame	Irwindale Speedway, Irwindale, California	July 3
4	NAPA Auto Parts Colorado 150	Colorado National Speedway, Dacono, Colorado	July 31
5	NAPA Auto Parts 150 presented by Sunrise Ford	Irwindale Speedway, Irwindale, California	August 21
6	Portland 112	Portland International Raceway, Portland, Oregon	September 11
7	Star Nursery 150	Las Vegas Motor Speedway (Bullring), Las Vegas, Nevada	September 23
8	NAPA Auto Care 150	All American Speedway, Roseville, California	October 9
9	Arizona Lottery 100	Phoenix Raceway, Avondale, Arizona	November 6

== Results and standings ==
=== Race results ===
No.	Race	Pole position	Most laps led	Winning driver	Manufacturer	No.	Winning team	Report
1	General Tire 150	Ty Gibbs	Ty Gibbs	Ty Gibbs	Toyota	18	Joe Gibbs Racing	Report
2	General Tire 200	Jake Drew	Chase Briscoe (Note: Briscoe led all 51 laps.)	Chase Briscoe	Ford	14	Stewart-Haas Racing	Report
3	NAPA Auto Parts 150 presented by the West Coast Stock Car Hall of Fame	Dean Thompson	Dean Thompson	Jesse Love	Toyota	16	Bill McAnally Racing	Report
4	NAPA Auto Parts Colorado 150	Todd Souza	Jesse Love	Joey Iest	Ford	54	Naake-Klauer Motorsports	Report
5	NAPA Auto Parts 150 presented by Sunrise Ford	P. J. Pedroncelli	Trevor Huddleston	Jesse Love	Toyota	16	Bill McAnally Racing	Report
6	Portland 112	Jake Drew	Jake Drew	Taylor Gray	Ford	17	David Gilliland Racing	Report
7	Star Nursery 150	Jake Drew	Taylor Gray	Taylor Gray	Ford	17E	David Gilliland Racing	Report
8	NAPA Auto Care 150	Dean Thompson	Cole Moore	P. J. Pedroncelli	Toyota	33	Pedroncelli Racing	Report
9	Arizona Lottery 100	Ty Gibbs	Ty Gibbs (Note: Gibbs led all 100 laps.)	Ty Gibbs	Toyota	18	Joe Gibbs Racing	Report

=== Drivers' championship ===
Notes:

- The pole winner also receives one bonus point, similar to the previous ARCA points system used until 2019 and unlike NASCAR.
- Additionally, after groups of five races of the season, drivers that compete in all five races receive fifty additional points.
  - Jesse Love, Jake Drew, P. J. Pedroncelli, Cole Moore, Joey Iest, Todd Souza, Trevor Huddleston, Takuma Koga, Bridget Burgess, and Bobby Hillis Jr. received this points bonus for having competed in the first five races of the season (the first race at Phoenix, Sonoma, the first race at Irwindale, Colorado, and the second race at Irwindale). Those ten drivers along with Paul Pedroncelli and Taylor Gray received this points bonus for having competed in the last four races of the season (Portland, the Las Vegas Bullring, Roseville, and the second race at Phoenix).

(key) Bold – Pole position awarded by time. Italics – Pole position set by final practice results or rainout. * – Most laps led. ** – All laps led.

Pos	Driver	PHO	SON	IRW	CNS	IRW	PIR	LVS	AAS	PHO	Points
1	Jesse Love	6	19	1	2*	1	3	13	12	14	438
2	Jake Drew **(R)**	18	**7**	4	3	2	**10***	**2**	8	11	438
3	Cole Moore **(R)**	12	4	5	4	6	12	6	5*	10	436
4	P. J. Pedroncelli	11	3	17	6	**3**	2	7	1	18	433
5	Joey Iest	16	20	3	1	4	4	4	2	17	430
6	Trevor Huddleston	10	12	6	10	10*	7	3	3	15	422
7	Todd Souza	8	5	7	7	7	17	16	4	16	410
8	Takuma Koga	23	11	16	15	8	5	8	9	23	378
9	Bridget Burgess	22	8	13	9	14	16	20	11	24	359
10	Bobby Hillis Jr.	24	10	10	17	12	15	15	18	29	346
11	Paul Pedroncelli		13	11	18	19	9	23	23	34	252
12	Taylor Gray	9					1	1*	22	2	245
13	Dean Thompson **(R)**	15	6	**2***	11			14	**17**	22	225
14	Eric Nascimento		14		5	9	11	11		32	182
15	Josh Fanopoulos			18	14			9	21	31	127
16	John Wood				12	15		19	19		111
17	Stafford Smith						8	12	6		106
18	Brian Kamisky		16			17			13	25	105
19	Ty Gibbs	1*								1**	98
20	Jolynn Wilkinson				8			17	15		92
21	Hiroyuki Ueno			12	16	16					88
22	Mariah Boudrieau				13	13		18			88
23	Amber Slagle			14				21	10		87
24	Johnny Borneman III			8		18				20	86
25	Amber Balcaen			15		11		22			84
26	Drew Dollar	7								7	75
27	Christian Rose							10	7		71
28	Tim Spurgeon		15				6				67
29	Nick Sanchez	21								4	63
30	Dave Smith		17				14				57
31	Rodd Kneeland		22				13				53
32	Tony Toste	17	18								53
33	Gracie Trotter	27								9	52
34	Chase Briscoe		1**								48
35	Caleb Costner						DNS		14	30	47
36	Corey Heim	2									43
37	Dylan Lupton		2								42
38	Thad Moffitt	3									42
39	Sammy Smith									3	41
40	Kyle Sieg	4									40
41	Derek Kraus	5									39
42	Ryan Partridge					5					39
43	Kyle Keller							5			39
44	J. P. Bergeron									5	39
45	Zane Smith	28	21								39
46	Jake Garcia									6	39
47	Rajah Caruth									8	37
48	Ryan Philpott		9								35
49	Nick Joanides			9							35
50	Travis Milburn								20	33	24
51	Daniel Dye									12	32
52	Tim Richmond	13									31
53	Parker Chase									13	31
54	Toni Breidinger	30								27	31
55	Mark Lowrey	14									30
56	Andrew Tuttle								16		28
57	Richard Garvie	19									25
58	Conner Jones									19	25
59	D. L. Wilson	20									24
60	Max Gutiérrez									21	23
61	Sebastian Arias					DNS				26	21
62	Bryce Haugeberg	25									19
63	Brad Smith	26									18
64	Ryan Roulette									28	16
65	Jack Wood	29									15

== See also ==
- 2021 NASCAR Cup Series
- 2021 NASCAR Xfinity Series
- 2021 NASCAR Camping World Truck Series
- 2021 ARCA Menards Series
- 2021 ARCA Menards Series East
- 2021 NASCAR Whelen Modified Tour
- 2021 NASCAR Pinty's Series
- 2021 NASCAR PEAK Mexico Series
- 2021 NASCAR Whelen Euro Series
- 2021 eNASCAR iRacing Pro Invitational Series
- 2021 SRX Series
- 2021 Southern Modified Auto Racing Teams season
