= Jolynn Wilkinson =

American racing driver (born 2004)

Jolynn "JoJo" Wilkinson
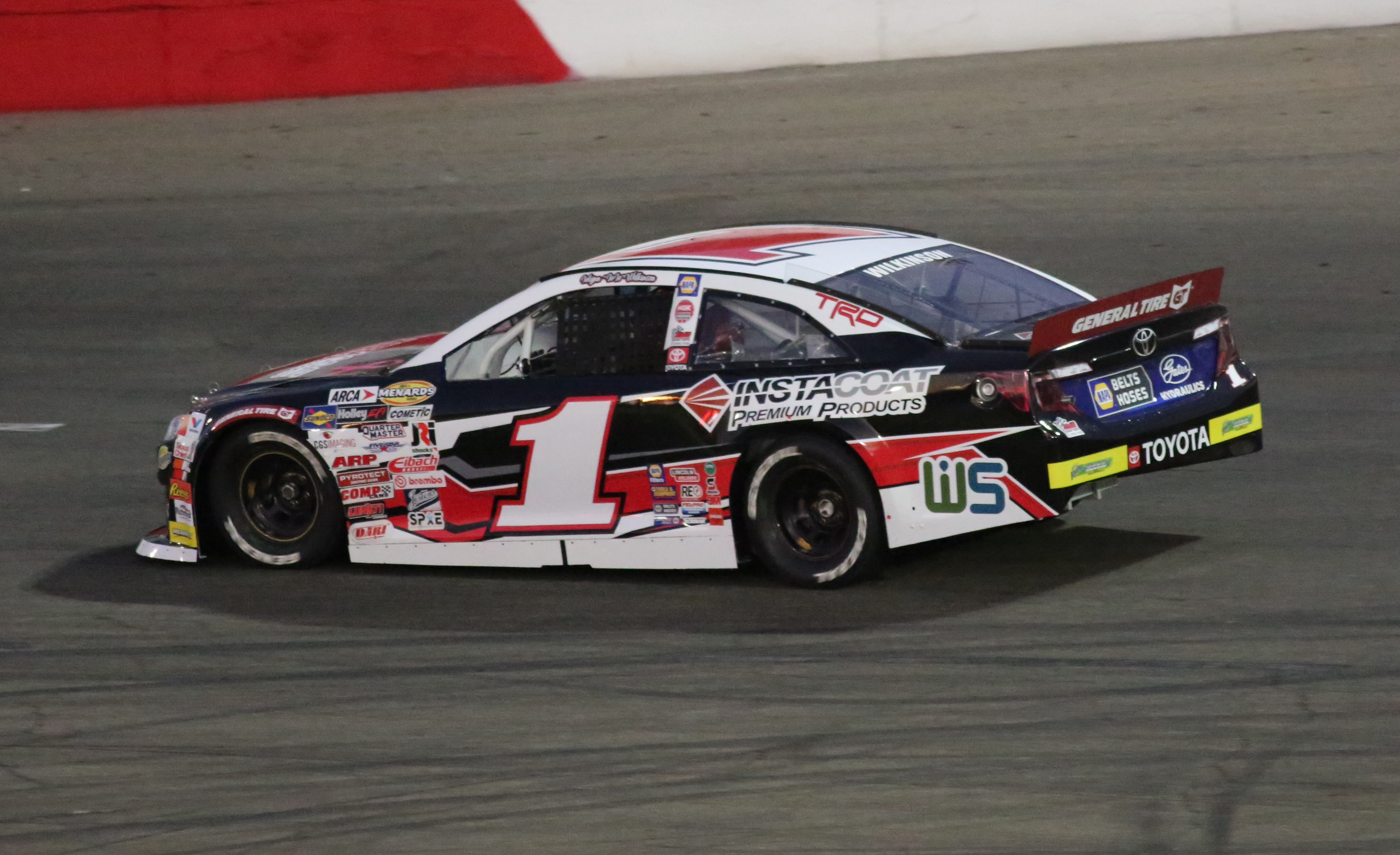
- Wilkinson at the All American Speedway in 2021.
- Born: Jolynn Wilkinson; February 25, 2004 (age 22); Hueytown, Alabama, U.S.

ARCA Menards Series West career
- Best finish: 20th (2021)
- First race: 2021 NAPA Auto Parts Colorado 150 (Colorado)
- Last race: 2021 NAPA Auto Care 150 (Roseville)
Wins	Top tens	Poles
0	1	0
- Statistics up to date as of February 10, 2025.

Jolynn "JoJo" Wilkinson (born February 25, 2004) is an American professional stock car racing driver. She last competed part-time in the ARCA Menards Series West, driving the No. 19 and 1 Toyota Camry for Bill McAnally Racing.

== Racing career ==
=== Early career ===
Wilkinson started racing at twelve years old, driving in the Alabama National Karting League. She would go on winning races, and championships throughout her karting career.

From 2017 to the present, Wilkinson primarily races in the Show Me the Money Pro Model Series, a late model series that races at Montgomery Motor Speedway. She became the youngest female driver in 2017 to race in the Alabama 200, at thirteen years old. She ran the full-time schedule in 2018, finishing 6th in the standings, and winning Rookie of the Year honors. She made nine more starts in the series from 2018 to 2021, collecting two top 10s in 2020.

On May 13, 2018, Wilkinson captured her first career late model win at Huntsville Speedway, and would end up winning again a month later.

On April 26, 2019, Wilkinson was involved in a serious wreck at Five Flags Speedway. Her car got loose in turn 4, causing her to spin out in the middle of the frontstretch, and then getting t-boned on the window net side of the car by another driver. Wilkinson suffered a concussion, a broken ankle, and had stitches in her elbow after the wreck. She spent two months in therapy, until making her return to racing at Sayre Speedway later that year.

In 2020, Wilkinson made her debut in the CRA JEGS All-Star Tour, making only one start. Racing at the Nashville Fairgrounds Speedway, she started 24th and finished 11th. Wilkinson was expected to make two starts in the series in 2021, but failed to qualify for the first race, but managed to make the second one, as she finished 15th.

=== ARCA Menards Series West ===
Wilkinson would make her first start in the ARCA Menards Series West with Bill McAnally Racing at the Colorado National Speedway, finishing 8th, getting her first top 10. She made two more starts later in the season, finishing in 15th and 17th respectively.

== Personal life ==
Wilkinson is the daughter of former NASCAR and ARCA driver, John "Boy" Wilkinson. She has two sisters, Clarissa Wilkinson and Alyssa Wilkinson. She was a cheerleader at the Hueytown High School, class of 2022.

== Motorsports career results ==
=== ARCA Menards Series West ===
(key) (Bold – Pole position awarded by qualifying time. Italics – Pole position earned by points standings or practice time. * – Most laps led.)

ARCA Menards Series West results
Year	Team	No.	Make	1	2	3	4	5	6	7	8	9	AMSWC	Pts	Ref
2021	Bill McAnally Racing	19	Toyota	PHO	SON	IRW	CNS; 8	IRW	PIR				20th	92	
2021	Bill McAnally Racing	1	Toyota							LVS; 17	AAS; 15	PHO	20th	92	
