= Hiroyuki Ueno =

American racing driver

- Born: July 24, 1977 (age 49); Osaka, Japan

ARCA Menards Series West career
- 3 races run over 1 year
- Best finish: 21st (2021)
- First race: 2021 NAPA Auto Parts 150 presented by the West Coast Stock Car Hall of Fame (Irwindale)
- Last race: 2021 NAPA Auto Parts 150 presented by Sunrise Ford (Irwindale)
Wins	Top tens	Poles
0	0	0
- Statistics up to date as of January 29, 2025.

Hiroyuki Ueno (born July 24, 1977) is a Japanese professional stock car racing driver who has previously competed in the ARCA Menards Series West for three races in 2021, getting a best finish of twelfth at Irwindale Speedway.

Ueno has also previously competed in the South West Tour Truck Series.

== Motorsports results ==
=== ARCA Menards Series West ===
ARCA Menards Series West results
Year	Team	No.	Make	1	2	3	4	5	6	7	8	9	AMSWC	Pts	Ref
2021	Kart Idaho Racing	38	Ford	PHO	SON	IRW; 12	CNS; 16	IRW; 16	PIR	LVS	AAS	PHO	21st	88	
