= Tony Toste =

American racing driver (born 1968)

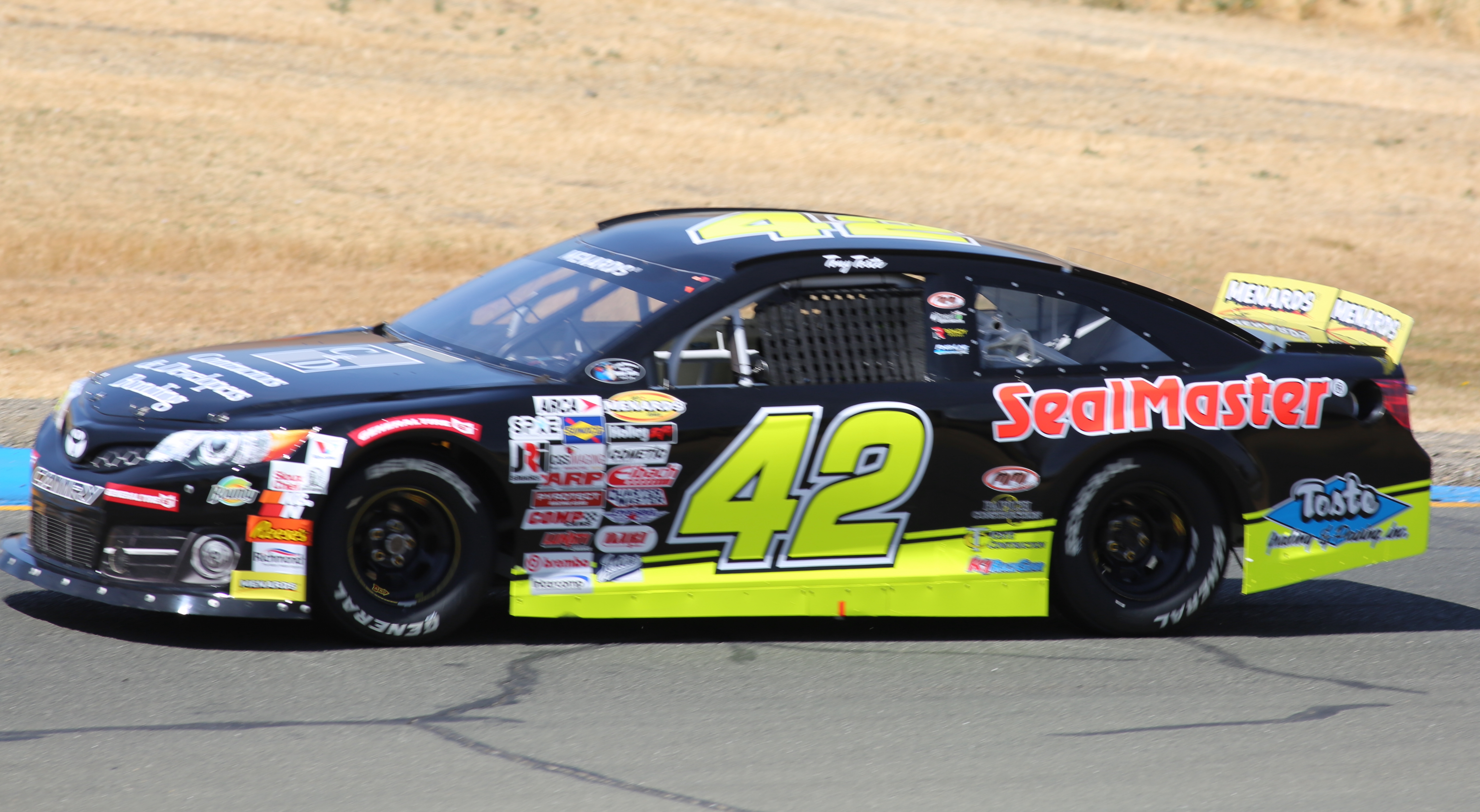
- Toste's No. 42 car at Sonoma Raceway in 2021
- Born: March 19, 1968 (age 58); Pismo Beach, California, U.S.

NASCAR FedEx Freight Truck Series career
- 2 races run over 1 year
- Best finish: 80th (1997)
- First race: 1997 Kragen / Exide 151 (Sonoma)
- Last race: 1997 Dodge California Truckstop 300 (Mesa Marin)
Wins	Top tens	Poles
0	0	0

ARCA Menards Series career
- 1 race run over 1 year
- Best finish: 100th (2021)
- First race: 2021 General Tire 150 (Phoenix)
Wins	Top tens	Poles
0	0	0

ARCA Menards Series West career
- 32 races run over 8 years
- Best finish: 8th (1998)
- First race: 1998 Winston West 200 (Tucson)
- Last race: 2021 General Tire 200 (Sonoma)
Wins	Top tens	Poles
0	11	0
- Statistics up to date as of November 17, 2024.

Tony Toste (born March 19, 1968) is an American professional stock car racing driver who has competed in the NASCAR Craftsman Truck Series, the ARCA Menards Series, and the ARCA Menards Series West.

Toste has also previously competed in series such as the NASCAR Southwest Series, the Lucas Oil Midwest LateModel Racing Association, the Southwest Dirt Racing Association, and the West Coast Late Model Shootout Series.

== Motorsports results ==
=== NASCAR ===
(key) (Bold - Pole position awarded by qualifying time. Italics - Pole position earned by points standings or practice time. * – Most laps led.)

==== Craftsman Truck Series ====
NASCAR Craftsman Truck Series results
Year	Team	No.	Make	1	2	3	4	5	6	7	8	9	10	11	12	13	14	15	16	17	18	19	20	21	22	23	24	25	26	NCTC	Pts	Ref
1997	Blake Racing	12	Chevy	WDW	TUS	HOM	PHO	POR	EVG	I70	NHA	TEX	BRI	NZH	MLW	LVL	CNS	HPT	IRP	FLM	NSV	GLN	RCH	MAR	SON; 16	MMR; 26	CAL	PHO	LVS; DNQ	80th	210	

=== ARCA Menards Series ===
(key) (Bold - Pole position awarded by qualifying time. Italics - Pole position earned by points standings or practice time. * – Most laps led.)

ARCA Menards Series results
Year	Team	No.	Make	1	2	3	4	5	6	7	8	9	10	11	12	13	14	15	16	17	18	19	20	AMSC	Pts	Ref
2021	Performance P-1 Motorsports	77	Toyota	DAY	PHO; 17	TAL	KAN	TOL	CLT	MOH	POC	ELK	BLN	IOW	WIN	GLN	MCH	ISF	MLW	DSF	BRI	SLM	KAN	100th	27	

==== ARCA Menards Series West ====
ARCA Menards Series West results
Year	Team	No.	Make	1	2	3	4	5	6	7	8	9	10	11	12	13	14	AMSWC	Pts	Ref
1998	Toste Motorsports	10	Chevy	TUS; 16	LVS; 2	PHO; 10	CAL; 9	HPT; 11	MMR; 15	AMP; 20	POR; 8	CAL; 19	PPR; 9	EVG; 10	SON; 8	MMR; 14	LVS; 23	8th	1790	
1999	Toste Motorsports	10	Chevy	TUS; 15	LVS; 27	PHO; 12	CAL; 18	PPR	MMR	IRW	EVG	POR	IRW	RMR	LVS; 7	MMR; 22	MOT	23rd	684	
2008	Daniel Toste	91	Chevy	AAS	PHO; 9	CTS	IOW	CNS	SON; 38	IRW	DCS	EVG; 15	MMP; 9	IRW; 28	AMP; DNQ	AAS; 16		21st	701	
2009	Daniel Toste	91	Chevy	CTS	AAS	PHO	MAD	IOW	DCS	SON; 36	IRW	PIR	MMP	CNS	IOW	AAS		72nd	55	
2010	McGowan Motorsports	19	Chevy	AAS	PHO	IOW	DCS	SON	IRW	PIR	MRP	CNS	MMP; 7	AAS	PHO			58th	146	
2011	McGowan Motorsports	19	Chevy	PHO	AAS	MMP; 32	IOW	LVS	SON	IRW	EVG	PIR	CNS	MRP	SPO	AAS	PHO	88th	67	
2019	McGowan Motorsports	17	Chevy	LVS; 16	IRW	TUS	TUS	CNS	SON	DCS	IOW	EVG	GTW	MER	AAS	KCR	PHO	56th	28	
2021	Performance P-1 Motorsports	77	Toyota	PHO; 17														32nd	53	
2021	Cook Racing Technologies	42	Toyota		SON; 18	IRW	CNS	IRW	PIR	LVS	AAS	PHO						32nd	53	
