= Mariah Boudrieau =

American racing driver

- Born: February 2, 2001 (age 25); Colorado Springs, Colorado, U.S.

ARCA Menards Series West career
- 6 races run over 3 years
- Best finish: 22nd (2021)
- First race: 2021 NAPA Auto Parts Colorado 150 (Colorado)
- Last race: 2025 Colorado 150 (Colorado)
Wins	Top tens	Poles
0	0	0
- Statistics up to date as of August 1, 2025.

Mariah Boudrieau (born February 2, 2001) is an American professional stock car racing driver who last competed part-time in the ARCA Menards Series West, driving the No. 77 Toyota for Performance P-1 Motorsports. She has previously driven for the team from 2021 and 2023.

Boudrieau has also previously competed in the NASCAR Advance Auto Parts Weekly Series.

== Motorsports results ==
=== ARCA Menards Series West ===
(key) (Bold – Pole position awarded by qualifying time. Italics – Pole position earned by points standings or practice time. * – Most laps led. ** – All laps led.)

ARCA Menards Series West results
Year	Team	No.	Make	1	2	3	4	5	6	7	8	9	10	11	12	AMSWC	Pts	Ref
2021	Performance P-1 Motorsports	77	Toyota	PHO	SON	IRW	CNS; 13	IRW; 13	PIR	LVS; 18	AAS	PHO				22nd	88	
2023	Performance P-1 Motorsports	77	Toyota	PHO	IRW	KCR	PIR	SON	IRW	SHA	EVG	AAS	LVS; 15	MAD	PHO	52nd	29	
2025	Performance P-1 Motorsports	77	Toyota	KER	PHO	TUC; 11	CNS; 12	KER	SON	TRI	PIR	AAS	MAD	LVS	PHO	34th	65	
