= P. J. Pedroncelli =

American racing driver (born 1990)

P.J. Pedroncelli
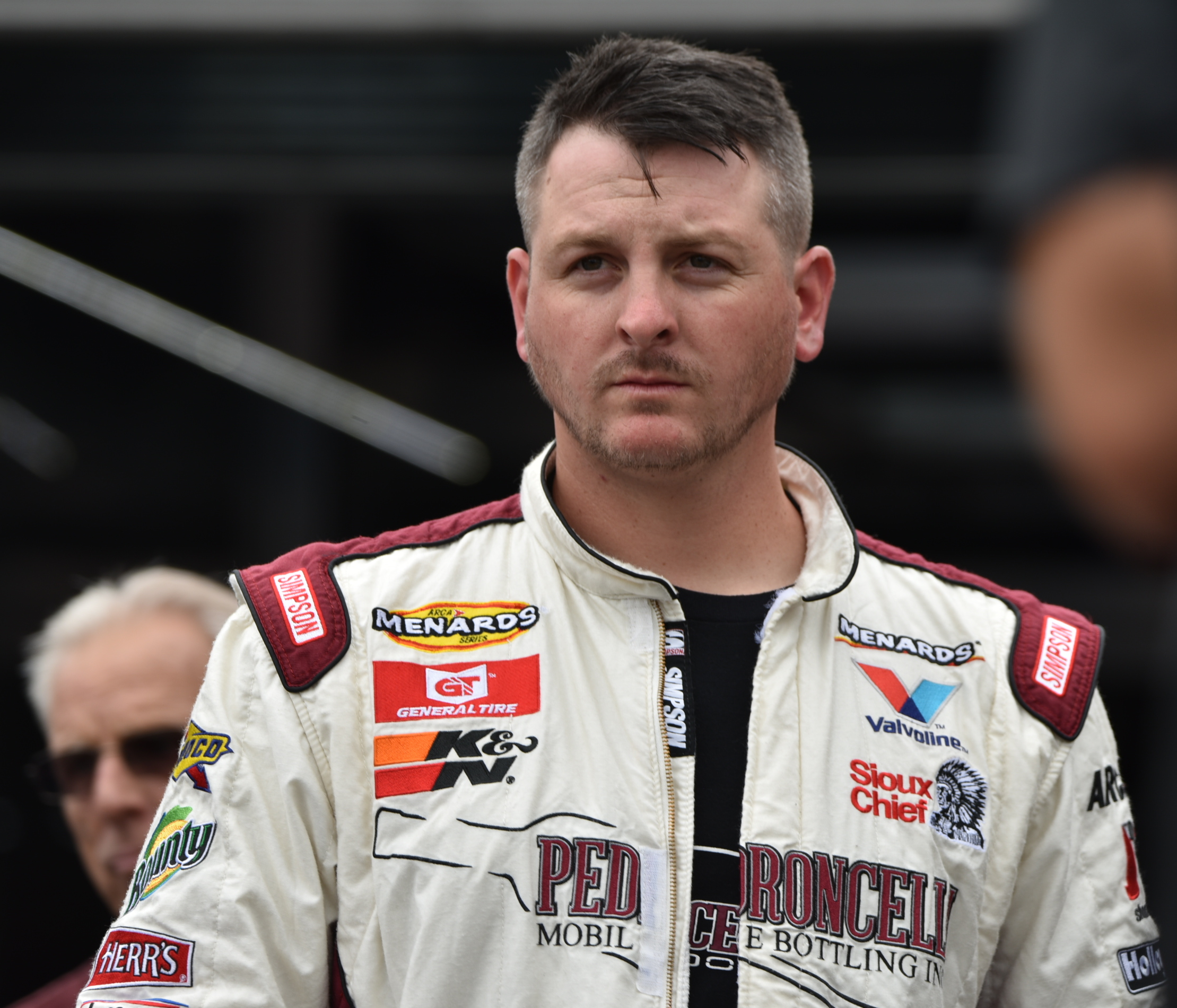
- Pedroncelli at Portland in 2021
- Born: Paul Pedroncelli Jr. April 25, 1990 (age 36); Sonoma, California, U.S.

ARCA Menards Series career
- 2 races run over 2 years
- Best finish: 88th (2021)
- First race: 2021 General Tire 150 (Phoenix)
- Last race: 2022 General Tire 150 (Phoenix)
| Wins | Top tens | Poles |
|---|---|---|
| 0 | 0 | 0 |

ARCA Menards Series West career
- 32 races run over 9 years
- Best finish: 4th (2021)
- First race: 2008 California Highway Patrol 200 (Irwindale)
- Last race: 2025 NAPA Auto Parts 150 presented by the West Coast Stock Car Motorsports Hall of Fame (Bakersfield)
- First win: 2021 NAPA Auto Care 150 (Roseville)
| Wins | Top tens | Poles |
|---|---|---|
| 1 | 10 | 2 |
- Statistics up to date as of February 28, 2026.

Paul "P. J." Pedroncelli Jr. (born April 25, 1990) is an American professional stock car racing driver. He last competed part-time in the ARCA Menards Series West, driving the No. 68 Chevrolet for Rodd Racing. He is the son of Paul Pedroncelli.

== Racing career ==
=== ARCA Menards Series West ===
Pedroncelli made his NASCAR Camping World West Series (now the ARCA Menards Series West) debut 2008, running four races at the Irwindale Speedway (2), Douglas County Speedway, and the Altamont Motorsports Park. His best finish was fourteenth at Douglas County. He ran four races the following year, with his best finish coming at the Madera Speedway, finishing eleventh. In 2010, Pedroncelli ran three races, with a best finish of fourteenth at the All American Speedway. He only ran one race in 2011 at Sonoma Raceway, finishing thirteenth.

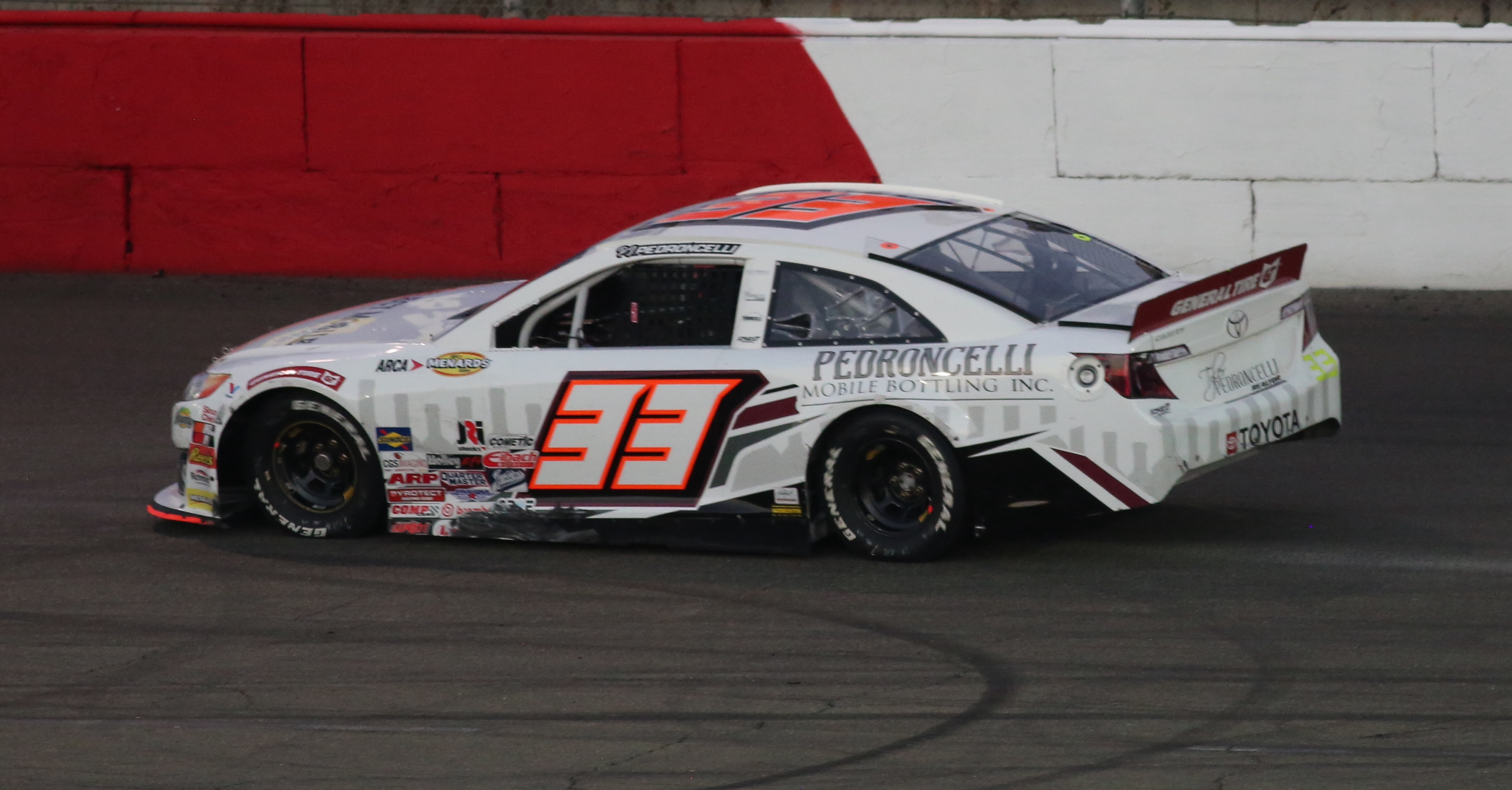
Pedroncelli's race-winning car at All American Speedway in 2021

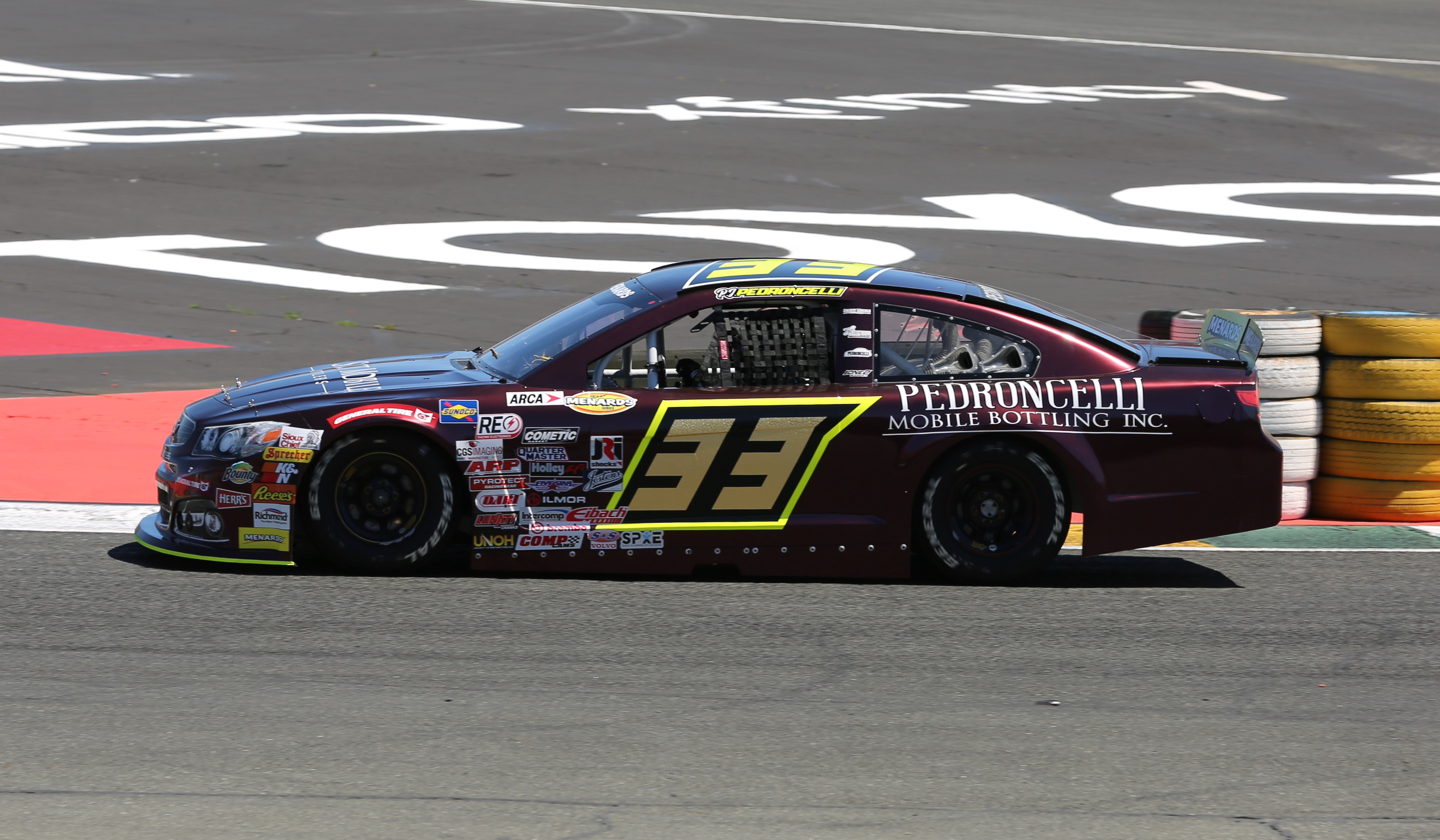
Pedroncelli's No. 33 car at Sonoma Raceway in 2022.

Pedroncelli did not make another start in the series until 2019. He made one start, finishing thirteenth at Sonoma.

In 2021, Pedroncelli ran a full season in the No. 33 Toyota Camry for his family's team, Pedroncelli Racing. He had a career year in 2021. His first top-ten finish in the series came in the second race of the season, where he finished third at Sonoma. Following a top-five finish at the Colorado National Speedway, he won his first career pole award the following weekend at Irwindale Speedway. He finished third in the race. This started a string of top-ten finishes for Pedroncelli, coming at Portland, Las Vegas, and Roseville. On the final lap of the race, Pedroncelli made the pass for the lead and took the checkered flag for his first ever victory. In the seasons standings, Pedroncelli finished fourth with 433 points.

=== ARCA Menards Series ===
Pedroncelli made his ARCA Menards Series debut, running in the race's paired event with the West Series at the Phoenix Raceway. Pedroncelli finished eleventh.

== Motorsports career results ==
=== ARCA Menards Series ===
(key) (Bold – Pole position awarded by qualifying time. Italics – Pole position earned by points standings or practice time. * – Most laps led. ** – All laps led.)

ARCA Menards Series results
| Year | Team | No. | Make | 1 | 2 | 3 | 4 | 5 | 6 | 7 | 8 | 9 | 10 | 11 | 12 | 13 | 14 | 15 | 16 | 17 | 18 | 19 | 20 | AMSC | Pts | Ref |
|---|---|---|---|---|---|---|---|---|---|---|---|---|---|---|---|---|---|---|---|---|---|---|---|---|---|---|
| 2021 | Pedroncelli Racing | 33 | Toyota | DAY | PHO; 11 | TAL | KAN | TOL | CLT | MOH | POC | ELK | BLN | IOW | WIN | GLN | MCH | ISF | MLW | DSF | BRI | SLM | KAN | 88th | 33 | |
| 2022 | Pedroncelli Motorsports | 33 | Toyota | DAY | PHO; 17 | TAL | KAN | CLT | IOW | BLN | ELK | MOH | POC | IRP | MCH | GLN | ISF | MLW | DSF | KAN | BRI | SLM | TOL | 99th | 27 | |

==== ARCA Menards Series West ====
ARCA Menards Series West results
| Year | Team | No. | Make | 1 | 2 | 3 | 4 | 5 | 6 | 7 | 8 | 9 | 10 | 11 | 12 | 13 | 14 | AMSWC | Pts | Ref |
|---|---|---|---|---|---|---|---|---|---|---|---|---|---|---|---|---|---|---|---|---|
| 2008 | Pedroncelli Racing | 0 | Chevy | AAS | PHO | CTS | IOW | CNS | SON | IRW; 21 | DCS; 14 | EVG | MMP | IRW; 27 | AMP; 22 | AAS | | 26th | 400 | |
| 2009 | Pedroncelli Racing | 0 | Chevy | CTS | AAS | PHO | MAD; 18 | IOW | DCS; 12 | SON; 27 | IRW | PIR | MMP | CNS | IOW | AAS; 21 | | 28th | 418 | |
| 2010 | Pedroncelli Racing | 0 | Chevy | AAS; 15 | PHO | IOW | DCS | SON; 20 | IRW | PIR | MRP | CNS | MMP | AAS | PHO; 35 | | | 38th | 279 | |
| 2011 | Pedroncelli Racing | 0 | Chevy | PHO | AAS | MMP | IOW | LVS | SON; 13 | IRW | EVG | PIR | CNS | MRP | SPO | AAS; DNQ | PHO | 58th | 212 | |
| 2019 | Pedroncelli Racing | 33 | Chevy | LVS | IRW | TUS | TUS | CNS | SON; 13 | DCS | IOW | EVG | GTW | MER | AAS | KCR | PHO | 53rd | 31 | |
| 2021 | Pedroncelli Racing | 33 | Toyota | PHO; 11 | | IRW; 17 | CNS; 6 | **IRW**; 3 | | LVS; 7 | AAS; 1 | PHO; 18 | | | | | | 4th | 433 | |
| 2021 | Pedroncelli Racing | 33 | Chevy | | SON; 3 | | | | PIR; 2 | | | | | | | | | 4th | 433 | |
| 2022 | Pedroncelli Motorsports | 33 | Toyota | PHO; 17 | IRW; 5 | **KCR**; 5* | | | IRW; 11 | EVG | PIR | AAS; 16 | LVS | PHO | | | | 10th | 283 | |
| 2022 | Pedroncelli Motorsports | 33 | Chevy | | | | PIR; 8 | SON; 16 | | | | | | | | | | 10th | 283 | |
| 2023 | Rodd Racing | 33 | Chevy | PHO | IRW | KCR | PIR | SON | IRW | SHA | EVG | AAS | LVS | MAD; Wth | PHO | | | N/A | 0 | |
| 2024 | Rodd Racing | 33 | Chevy | PHO | KER; 8 | PIR | SON | IRW | IRW | SHA | TRI | MAD | AAS | KER | PHO | | | 47th | 36 | |
| 2025 | Rodd Racing | 68 | Chevy | KER | PHO | TUC | CNS | KER; 10 | SON | TRI | PIR | AAS | MAD | LVS | PHO | | | 55th | 34 | |
