= Rodd Kneeland =

American racing driver (born 1966)

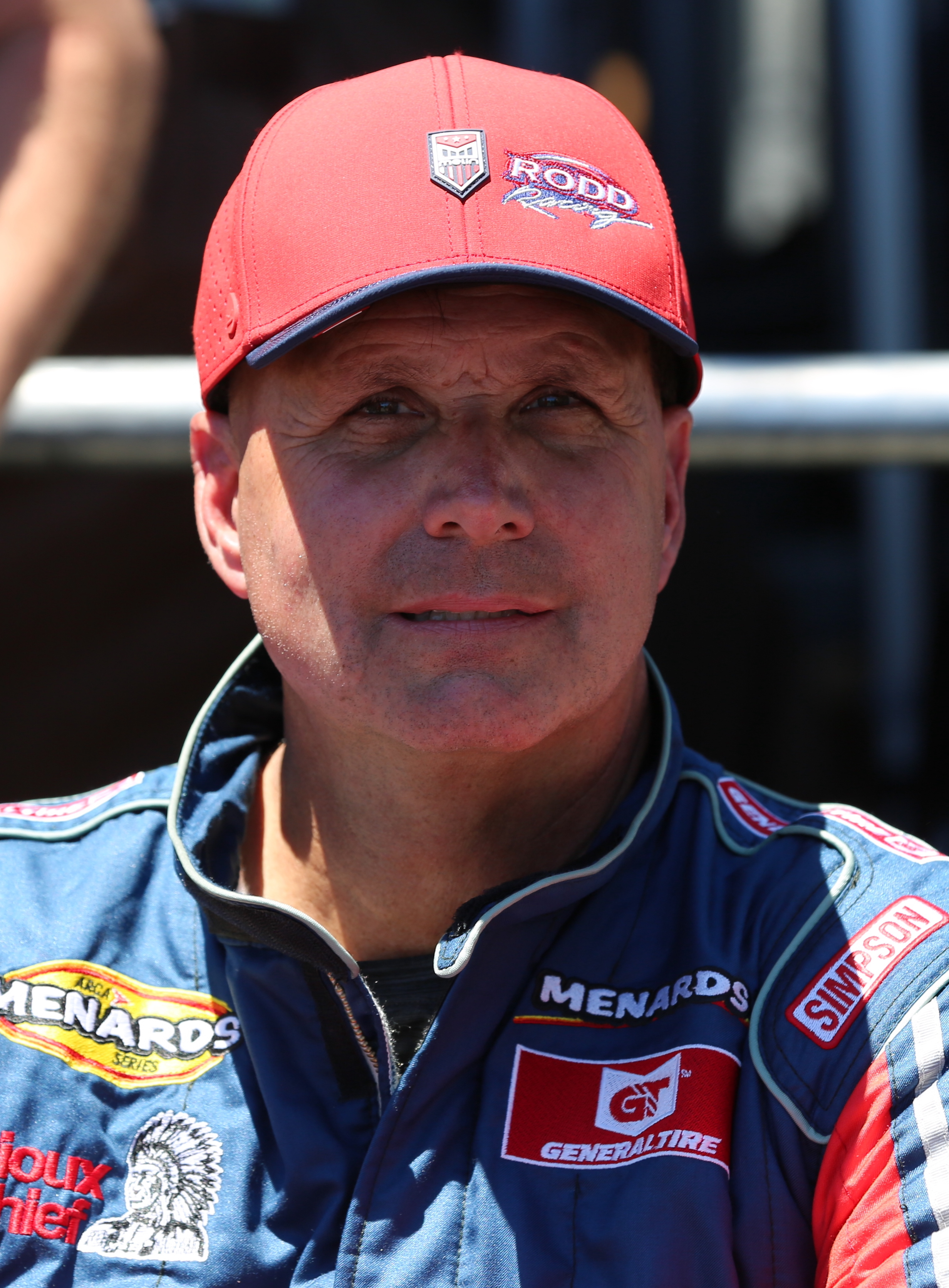
- Kneeland at Sonoma Raceway in 2026
- Born: June 17, 1966 (age 60); Sonoma, California, U.S.

ARCA Menards Series West career
- 17 races run over 13 years
- Best finish: 31st (2021)
- First race: 2009 NAPA Auto Parts/Toyota 150 (Madera)
- Last race: 2026 General Tire 150 (Sonoma)
Wins	Top tens	Poles
0	0	0
- Statistics up to date as of June 26, 2026.

Rodd Lee Kneeland (born June 17, 1966) is an American professional stock car racing driver. He last competed part-time in the ARCA Menards Series West driving the No. 68 Ford for his own team, Rodd Racing.

== Racing career ==
=== Beginnings ===
Kneeland's passion for racing came from winning three tickets to a NASCAR Winston West Series race at Sonoma Raceway in 1977. In high school, Kneeland had a '69 Camaro and was a part of the local racing scene, when he decided to try racing on a track, starting to race his Camaro and dirt modifieds.

=== ARCA Menards Series West ===
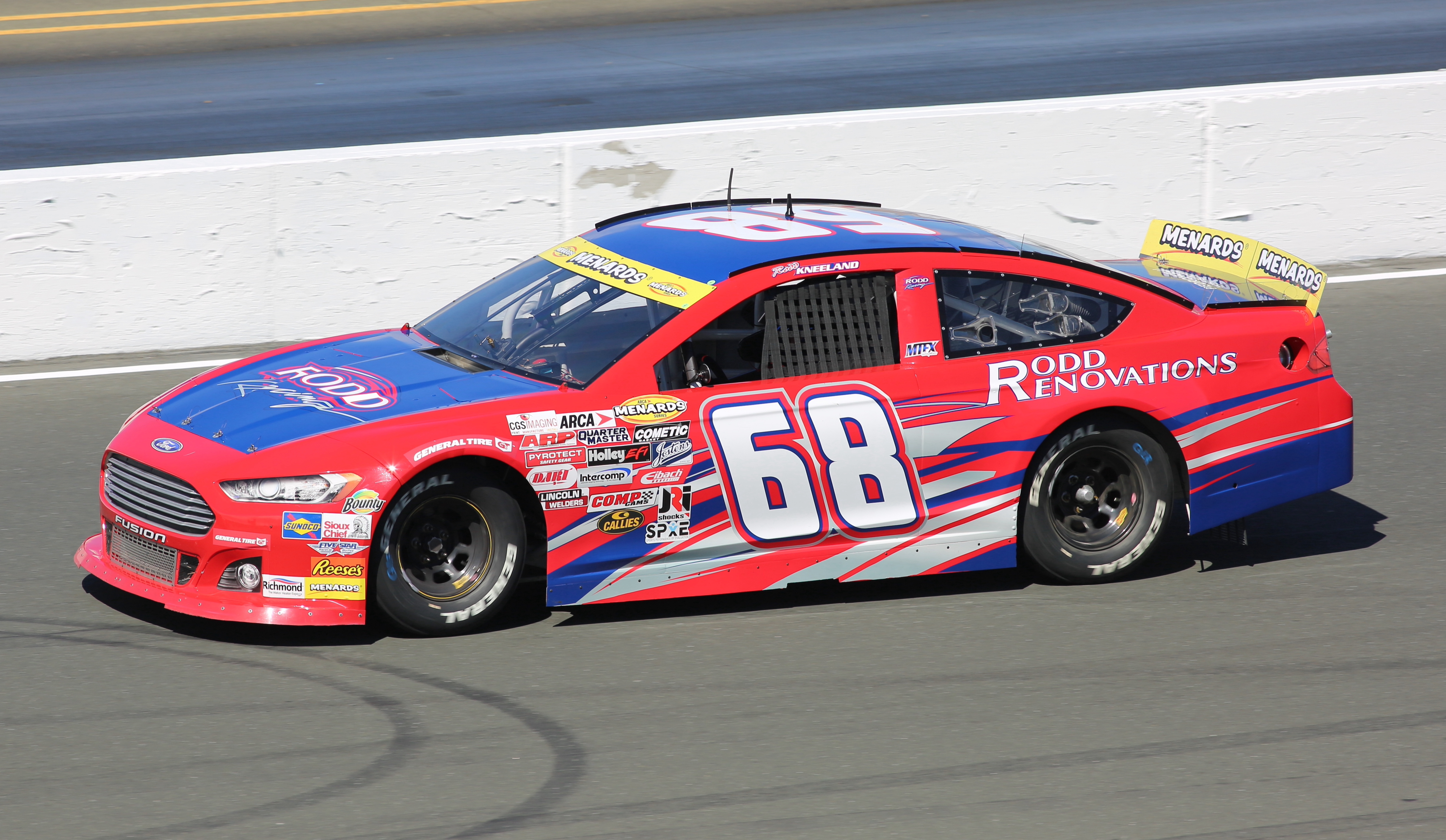
Kneeland's No. 68 car at Sonoma Raceway in 2026.

Kneeland would first make an attempt in the 2008 NASCAR Camping World West Series, but failed to qualify for the event. His first start would be in the 2009 NASCAR Camping World West Series at Madera Speedway, finishing 14th. Since then, he has only competed in NASCAR races in his home state of California.

== Personal life ==
Kneeland currently works two full-time jobs. He works as a Captain at the Sonoma Valley Fire Department and is part of his family's construction company in Sonoma, California. Kneeland had a brother, Todd, who died in a fiery car accident on August 16, 2015. Kneeland's wife, Jenise Kneeland, died on June 10, 2022, due to complications from cancer.

== Motorsports career results ==
=== ARCA Menards Series West ===
(key) (Bold – Pole position awarded by qualifying time. Italics – Pole position earned by points standings or practice time. * – Most laps led.)

ARCA Menards Series West results
Year	Team	No.	Make	1	2	3	4	5	6	7	8	9	10	11	12	13	14	15	AMSWC	Pts	Ref
2008	Rodd Racing	98	Chevy	AAS	PHO	CTS	IOW	CNS	SON	IRW	DCS	EVG	MMP	IRW	AMP; DNQ	AAS			76th	67	
2009	Rodd Racing	98	Chevy	CTS	AAS	PHO	MAD; 14	IOW	DCS	SON	IRW	PIR	MMP	CNS	IOW	AAS; 11			37th	251	
2010	Rodd Racing	98	Chevy	AAS	PHO	IOW	DCS; 15	SON	IRW	PIR	MRP	CNS	MMP	AAS; 15	PHO				44th	236	
2012	Rodd Racing	68	Chevy	PHO	LHC	MMP	S99	IOW	BIR	LVS	SON	EVG	CNS	IOW	PIR	SMP	AAS; DNQ	PHO	86th	14	
2015	Rodd Racing	68	Chevy	KCR	IRW	TUS	IOW	SHA; 18	SON	SLS	IOW	EVG	CNS	MER	AAS; DNQ	PHO			40th	43	
2016	Rodd Racing	68	Chevy	IRW	KCR	TUS	OSS	CNS	SON; 18	SLS	IOW	EVG	DCS	UMC	UMC	MER	AAS		50th	26	
2017	Rodd Racing	68	Chevy	TUS	KCR	IRW	IRW	SPO	OSS	CNS	SON; 19	IOW	EVG	DCS	MER	AAS	KCR		56th	25	
2018	Rodd Racing	68	Chevy	KCR	TUS	TUS	OSS	CNS	SON; 14	DCS	IOW	EVG	GTW	LVS	MER	AAS	KCR		47th	30	
2019	Rodd Racing	68	Chevy	LVS	IRW	TUS	TUS	CNS	SON; 25	DCS	IOW	EVG	GTW	MER	AAS	KCR	PHO		64th	19	
2021	Rodd Racing	68	Chevy	PHO	SON; 22	IRW	CNS	IRW	PIR; 13	LVS	AAS	PHO							31st	53	
2022	Rodd Racing	68	Chevy	PHO	IRW	KCR	PIR	SON; 20	IRW	EVG	PIR	AAS	LVS	PHO					61st	24	
2023	High Point Racing	55	Ford	PHO	IRW	KCR	PIR	SON	IRW	SHA	EVG	AAS; 18	LVS	MAD	PHO				59th	26	
2024	Rodd Racing	68	Chevy	PHO	KER	PIR	SON; 15	IRW	IRW	SHA	TRI	MAD	AAS	KER	PHO				60th	29	
2025	Rodd Racing	68	Chevy	KER	PHO	TUC	CNS	KER	SON; 22	TRI	PIR	AAS	MAD	LVS	PHO				73rd	22	
2026	Rodd Racing	68	Ford	KER	PHO	TUC	SHA	CNS	TRI	SON; 18	PIR	AAS	MAD	LVS	PHO	KER			72nd	26	
