= Paul Pedroncelli =

American racing driver (born 1962)

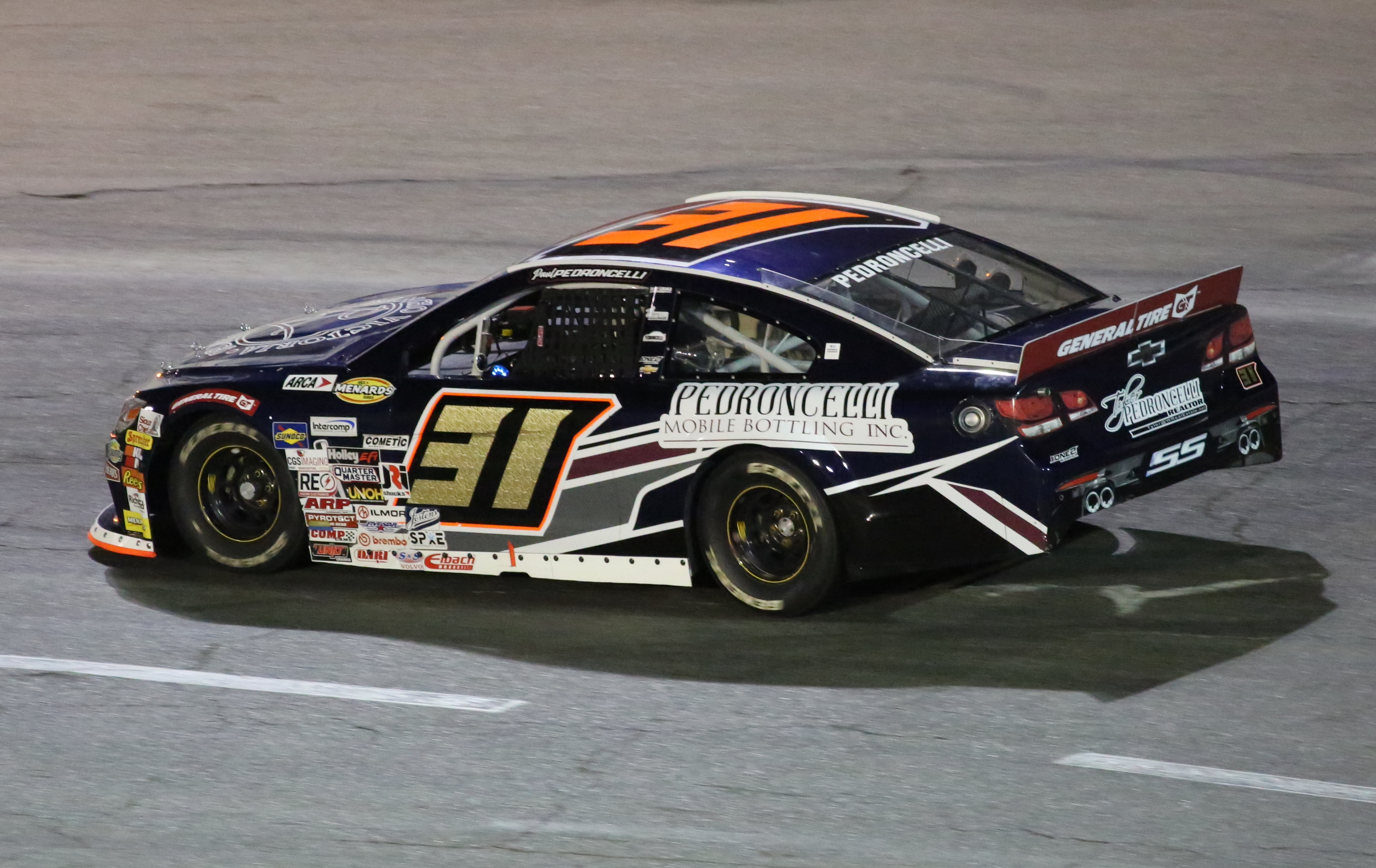
- Born: August 29, 1962 (age 64); Sonoma, California, U.S.

ARCA Menards Series career
- 1 race run over 1 year
- ARCA no., team: No. 31 (Pedroncelli Motorsports)
- First race: 2022 General Tire 150 (Phoenix)
| Wins | Top tens | Poles |
|---|---|---|
| 0 | 0 | 0 |

ARCA Menards Series West career
- 15 races run over 2 years
- Best finish: 11th (2021)
- First race: 2021 General Tire 200 (Sonoma)
- Last race: 2022 NAPA Auto Parts 150 presented by Berco Redwood (Roseville)
| Wins | Top tens | Poles |
|---|---|---|
| 0 | 1 | 0 |
- Statistics up to date as of April 30, 2026.

Paul Pedroncelli (born August 29, 1962) is an American professional stock car racing driver. He last competed full-time in the ARCA Menards Series West, driving the No. 31 Chevrolet for Pedroncelli Motorsports. He is the father of P. J. Pedroncelli.

== Racing career ==
=== ARCA Menards Series West ===
Pedroncelli made his ARCA Menards Series West debut in 2021 at Sonoma Raceway finishing on the lead lap in 13th. Pedroncelli ran eight out the nine races. At the Portland International Raceway, Pedroncelli got his first top ten finish, coming in ninth. He would go on to finish eleventh in the points.

In 2022, Pedroncelli would run the first six races of the schedule, finishing 38th in the companion event with the main ARCA Menards Series, finishing 15th at Irwindale Speedway in March due to brake issues after two laps, 18th at Kern County Raceway Park after two laps due to a vibration, 16th at Portland due to brake issues, 23rd at Sonoma due to brake issues again, and 21st at Irwindale in July due to transmission issues. He would not return until All-American Speedway, where he would finish 21st due to brake issues after three laps.

=== ARCA Menards Series ===
Pedroncelli would make his ARCA Menards Series debut in 2022 at Phoenix Raceway, as it was a companion event with the West Series, finishing 38th.

== Motorsports career results ==
=== ARCA Menards Series ===
(key) (Bold – Pole position awarded by qualifying time. Italics – Pole position earned by points standings or practice time. * – Most laps led. ** – All laps led.)

ARCA Menards Series results
| Year | Team | No. | Make | 1 | 2 | 3 | 4 | 5 | 6 | 7 | 8 | 9 | 10 | 11 | 12 | 13 | 14 | 15 | 16 | 17 | 18 | 19 | 20 | AMSC | Pts | Ref |
|---|---|---|---|---|---|---|---|---|---|---|---|---|---|---|---|---|---|---|---|---|---|---|---|---|---|---|
| 2022 | Pedroncelli Motorsports | 31 | Chevy | DAY | PHO; 38 | TAL | KAN | CLT | IOW | BLN | ELK | MOH | POC | IRP | MCH | GLN | ISF | MLW | DSF | KAN | BRI | SLM | TOL | 123rd | 6 | |

==== ARCA Menards Series West ====
ARCA Menards Series West results
| Year | Team | No. | Make | 1 | 2 | 3 | 4 | 5 | 6 | 7 | 8 | 9 | 10 | 11 | AMSWC | Pts | Ref |
|---|---|---|---|---|---|---|---|---|---|---|---|---|---|---|---|---|---|
| 2021 | Pedroncelli Racing | 31 | Chevy | PHO | SON; 13 | IRW; 11 | CNS; 18 | IRW; 19 | PIR; 9 | LVS; 23 | AAS; 23 | PHO; 34 | | | 11th | 252 | |
| 2022 | Pedroncelli Motorsports | 31 | Chevy | PHO; 38 | IRW; 15 | KCR; 18 | PIR; 16 | SON; 23 | IRW; 21 | EVG | PIR | AAS; 21 | LVS | PHO | 15th | 206 | |
