= Bridget Burgess =

Australian racing driver

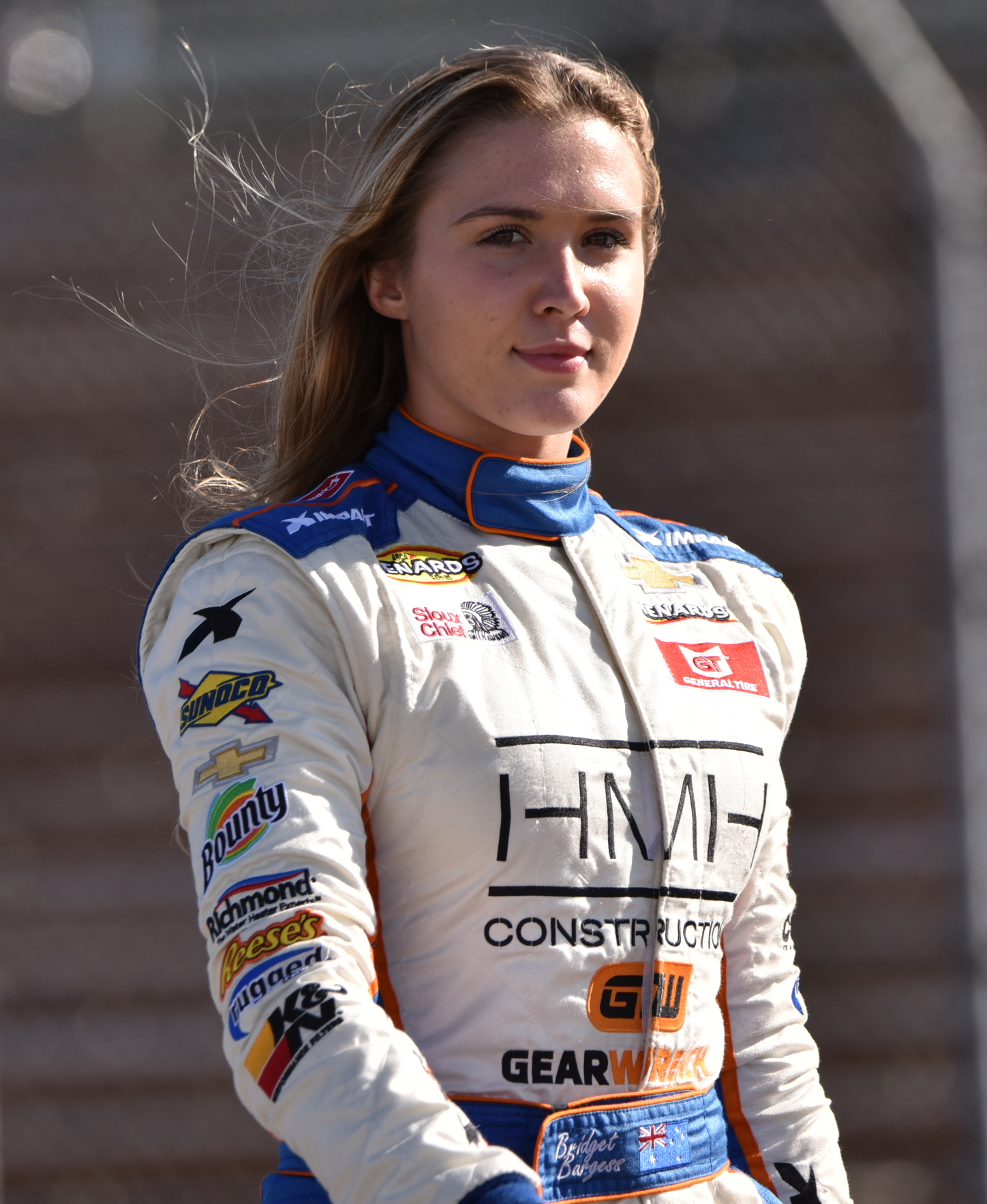
- Burgess at Portland International Raceway in 2021
- Born: December 26, 2001 (age 24); Brisbane, Australia

ARCA Menards Series career
- 2 races run over 2 years
- Best finish: 107th (2021)
- First race: 2021 General Tire 150 (Phoenix)
- Last race: 2022 General Tire 150 (Phoenix)
Wins	Top tens	Poles
0	0	0

ARCA Menards Series West career
- 31 races run over 4 years
- Best finish: 7th (2022)
- First race: 2019 NAPA Auto Parts Idaho 208 (Meridian)
- Last race: 2022 Desert Diamond Casino West Valley 100 (Phoenix)
Wins	Top tens	Poles
0	9	0
- Statistics up to date as of June 26, 2026.

Bridget Burgess (born December 26, 2001) is an Australian-American stock car racing driver. She last competed full-time in the ARCA Menards Series West, driving the No. 88 Chevrolet for her family-owned team, BMI Racing.

Born in Australia, Burgess and her family moved to the United States in 2008. After beginning her racing career in short course off-road racing, she transitioned to competing on asphalt in 2019 to pursue a career in NASCAR.

== Racing career ==
Burgess ran her first off-road race at age 15. In 2017, she competed in the Open V8 class of the Lucas Oil Off Road Racing Series, scoring a podium finish in her debut race. She later competed in the series' Pro Lite class as well. Burgess began her stock car career in 2019 with a pair of races in the NASCAR K&N Pro Series West, where she finished 12th and 11th at Meridian Speedway and All American Speedway respectively.

At the 2020 ARCA Menards Series West series opener at the Las Vegas Bullring, Burgess' car suffered a gear failure, leaving her with a 17th-place finish. After skipping the series' doubleheader at her home track in Utah, Burgess' family team received a 2007 Toyota chassis on loan from Bill McAnally Racing. She drove the car in the remaining eight races of the season, leading to a streak of three consecutive top-ten finishes, including a career-best of seventh in her return to Las Vegas.

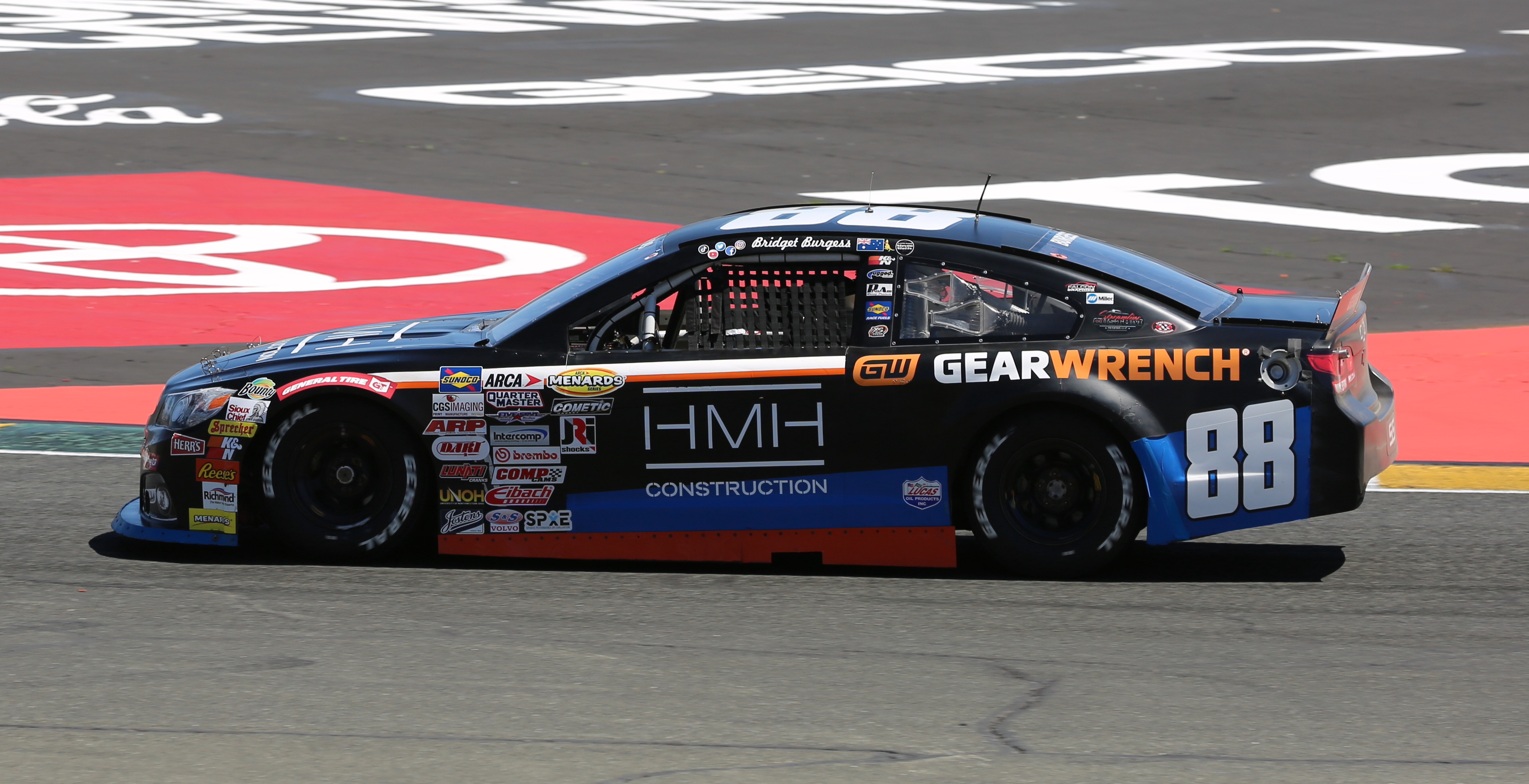
Burgess' No. 88 car at Sonoma Raceway in 2022.

Burgess began the 2021 season with sponsorship from GearWrench tools and HMH Construction. In March, she made her ARCA Menards Series debut through a combination race with the West Series at Phoenix Raceway, where she finished 22nd. Her season-best was an eighth-place finish at Sonoma Raceway. Burgess ran as high as fifth in the race, which was her first in the series on a road course.

On March 8, 2022, Burgess announced that she would return full-time to the ARCA Menards Series West. Burgess tied her career-best finish at Portland International Raceway, finishing seventh. The next week, she followed up with another top-ten run by finishing tenth at Sonoma. At the Las Vegas Bullring, Burgess competed against her mother, Sarah Burgess, as the pair became the first mother and daughter to compete against each other in a NASCAR-sanctioned race. Bridget finished in 12th place ahead of Sarah in 17th.

== Personal life ==
Originally from Brisbane, Queensland, Australia, Burgess' family moved to the United States in 2008 to pursue opportunities in motorsports. She currently lives in Tooele, Utah, near Utah Motorsports Campus. Her father, Adam, serves as her spotter. Her mother, Sarah, is a former off-road racing competitor and serves as Burgess' crew chief and owner. With a lack of funding compared to bigger teams in the series, Sarah is often tasked with completing the jobs of an entire pit crew, such as changing all four tires during a pit stop by herself.

Burgess frequently helps with mechanical work on her equipment; during the 2020 ARCA West season, she replaced the gear differential on her car between races on back-to-back days.

== Motorsports career results ==
=== ARCA Menards Series ===
(key) (Bold – Pole position awarded by qualifying time. Italics – Pole position earned by points standings or practice time. * – Most laps led.)

ARCA Menards Series results
Year	Team	No.	Make	1	2	3	4	5	6	7	8	9	10	11	12	13	14	15	16	17	18	19	20	AMSC	Pts	Ref
2021	BMI Racing	88	Chevy	DAY	PHO; 22	TAL	KAN	TOL	CLT	MOH	POC	ELK	BLN	IOW	WIN	GLN	MCH	ISF	MLW	DSF	BRI	SLM	KAN	107th	22	
2022	BMI Racing	88	Chevy	DAY	PHO; 23	TAL	KAN	CLT	IOW	BLN	ELK	MOH	POC	IRP	MCH	GLN	ISF	MLW	DSF	KAN	BRI	SLM	TOL	111th	21	

==== ARCA Menards Series West ====
ARCA Menards Series West results
Year	Team	No.	Make	1	2	3	4	5	6	7	8	9	10	11	12	13	14	AMSWC	Pts	Ref
2019	Tim Spurgeon	86	Toyota	LVS	IRW	TUS	TUS	CNS	SON	DCS	IOW	EVG	GTW	MER; 12				31st	65	
2019	Stafford Smith	34	Toyota												AAS; 11	KCR	PHO	31st	65	
2020	BMI Racing	88	Chevy	LVS; 17	MMP	MMP												10th	383	
2020	BMI Racing	88	Toyota				IRW; 12	EVG; 11	DCS; 9	CNS; 10	LVS; 7	AAS; 11	KCR; 14	PHO; 22				10th	383	
2021	BMI Racing	88	Chevy	PHO; 22	SON; 8	IRW; 13	CNS; 9	IRW; 14	PIR; 16	LVS; 20	AAS; 11	PHO; 24						9th	359	
2022	BMI Racing	88	Chevy	PHO; 23	IRW; 12	KCR; 12	PIR; 7	SON; 10	IRW; 19	EVG; 10	PIR; 10	AAS; 19	LVS; 12	PHO; 17				7th	483	
