= 2022 Star Nursery 150 =

10th race of the 2022 ARCA Menards Series West

Race details
- Race 10 of 11 of the 2022 ARCA Menards Series West
- Date: October 14, 2022
- Official name: 5th Annual Star Nursery 150
- Location: Las Vegas Motor Speedway Bullring, North Las Vegas, Nevada
- Course: Permanent racing facility
- Course length: 0.375 miles (0.604 km)
- Distance: 158 laps, 59.25 mi (95.43 km)
- Scheduled distance: 150 laps, 56.25 mi (90.53 km)
- Average speed: 49.895 mph (80.298 km/h)

Pole position
Driver	Taylor Gray	David Gilliland Racing
- Time: 14.803

Most laps led
Driver	Taylor Gray	David Gilliland Racing
- Laps: 157

Winner
No. 71	Taylor Gray	David Gilliland Racing

Television in the United States
- Network: USA Network (Delayed until October 21, 2022); FloSports (Live Stream)
- Announcers: Charles Krall

Radio in the United States
- Radio: ARCA Racing Network

The 2022 Star Nursery 150 was the 10th stock car race of the 2022 ARCA Menards Series West season, and the 5th iteration of the event. The race is scheduled to be held on Friday, October 14, 2022, in North Las Vegas, Nevada at the Las Vegas Motor Speedway Bullring, a 0.375 mile (0.604 km) permanent oval shaped racetrack. The race was increased from 150 laps to 158 laps, due to a green–white–checkered finish. Taylor Gray, driving for David Gilliland Racing, would be unstoppable throughout the entire race, leading all but one lap for his fifth career ARCA Menards Series West win, and his second of the season. To fill out the podium, Andrés Pérez de Lara, driving for David Gilliland Racing, and Landen Lewis, driving for Bill McAnally Racing, would finish 2nd and 3rd, respectively.

This race also made history, as Sarah and Bridget Burgess become the first mother-daughter duo to race against each other in a NASCAR and ARCA event. Sarah drove a second car for her team, the 97, with sponsorship coming from eBay Motors.

This was also the 100th ARCA West Series start for Takuma Koga.

== Background ==
Las Vegas Motor Speedway, located in Clark County, Nevada in Las Vegas, Nevada about 15 miles northeast of the Las Vegas Strip, is a 1,200-acre (490 ha) complex of multiple tracks for motorsports racing. The complex is owned by Speedway Motorsports, Inc., which is headquartered in Charlotte, North Carolina.

=== Entry list ===
- (R) denotes rookie driver

#	Driver	Team	Make
02	Katie Hettinger	Young's Motorsports	Chevrolet
4	Sean Hingorani	Nascimento Motorsports	Toyota
05	David Smith	Shockwave Motorsports	Toyota
5	Jacob Smith	Jerry Pitts Racing	Ford
6	Jake Drew	Sunrise Ford Racing	Ford
7	Takuma Koga	Jerry Pitts Racing	Toyota
9	Tanner Reif (R)	Sunrise Ford Racing	Ford
11	Chris Lowden	Lowden Motorsports	Chevrolet
12	Kyle Keller (R)	Kyle Keller Racing	Ford
13	Todd Souza	Central Coast Racing	Toyota
16	Landen Lewis	Bill McAnally Racing	Chevrolet
17	Buddy Shepherd	McGowan Motorsports	Toyota
21	R. J. Smotherman	Lowden Motorsports	Chevrolet
39	Andrew Tuttle (R)	Last Chance Racing	Chevrolet
41	Tyler Reif	Lowden Motorsports	Ford
42	Amber Slagle	Cook Racing Technologies	Toyota
51	Andrés Pérez de Lara	David Gilliland Racing	Ford
54	Joey Iest	Naake-Klauer Motorsports	Ford
66	Eric Rhead	66 Rhead Racing	Chevrolet
71	Taylor Gray	David Gilliland Racing	Ford
84	Bradley Erickson	Naake-Klauer Motorsports	Ford
85	Vince Little	Last Chance Racing	Chevrolet
88	Bridget Burgess	BMI Racing	Chevrolet
97	Sarah Burgess	BMI Racing	Chevrolet
99	Cole Moore	Bill McAnally Racing	Chevrolet
Official entry list

== Practice/Qualifying ==
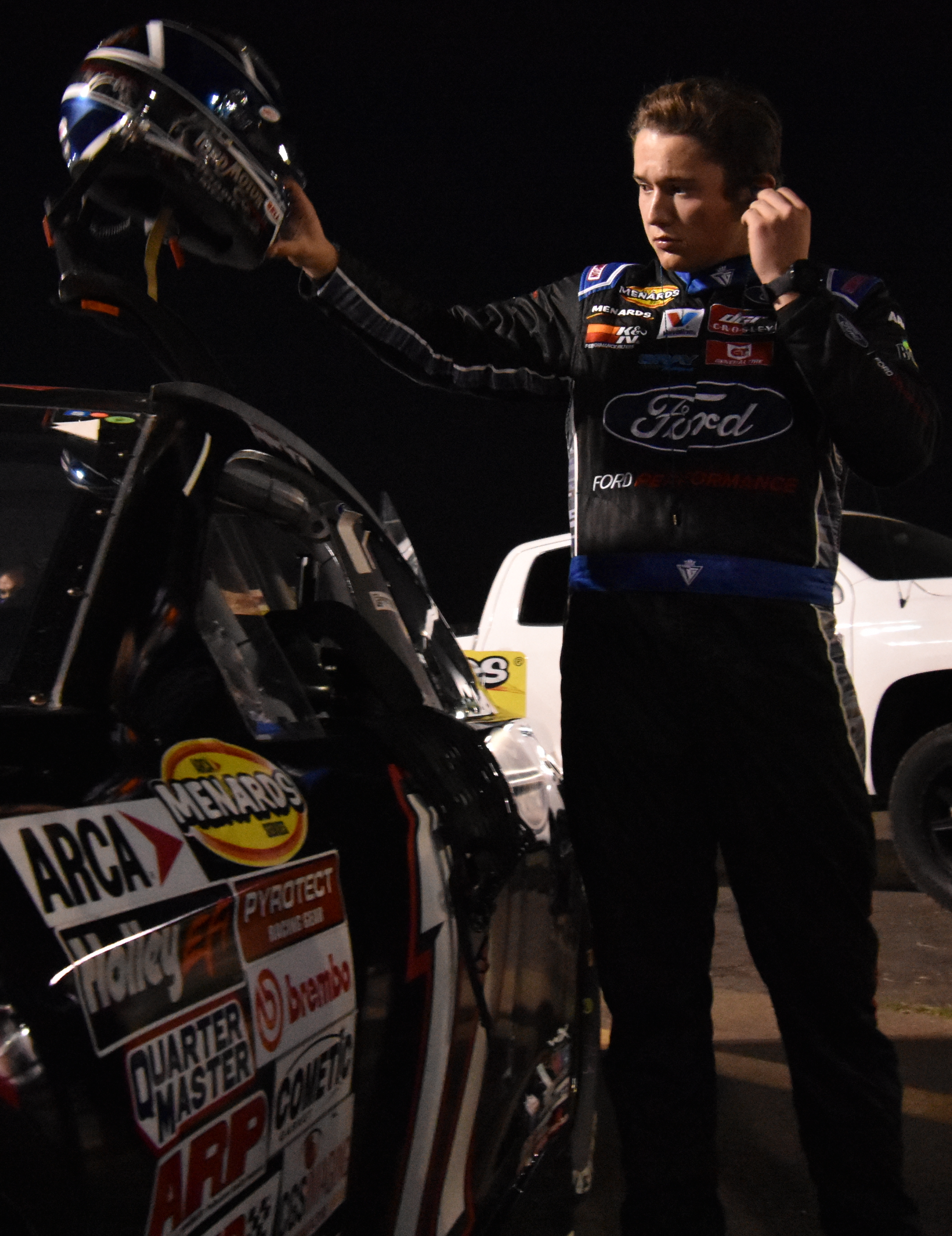
Taylor Gray would earn the pole for the race. He would ultimately win the race as well.

Practice and qualifying were both combined into one 90-minute session, with a driver's fastest time counting as their qualifying lap. The session was held on Friday, October 14, at 2:15 PM PST. Taylor Gray, driving for David Gilliland Racing, would score the pole for the race, with a lap of 14.803, and an average speed of 91.198 mph (146.769 km/h).

Pos.	#	Name	Team	Make	Time	Speed
1	71	Taylor Gray	David Gilliland Racing	Ford	14.803	91.198
2	51	Andrés Pérez de Lara	David Gilliland Racing	Ford	15.057	89.659
3	16	Landen Lewis	Bill McAnally Racing	Chevrolet	15.103	89.386
4	9	Tanner Reif (R)	Sunrise Ford Racing	Ford	15.180	88.933
5	12	Kyle Keller (R)	Kyle Keller Racing	Ford	15.194	88.851
6	84	Bradley Erickson	Naake-Klauer Motorsports	Ford	15.242	88.571
7	6	Jake Drew	Sunrise Ford Racing	Ford	15.261	88.461
8	54	Joey Iest	Naake-Klauer Motorsports	Ford	15.278	88.362
9	02	Katie Hettinger	Young's Motorsports	Chevrolet	15.298	88.247
10	99	Cole Moore	Bill McAnally Racing	Chevrolet	15.308	88.189
11	5	Jacob Smith	Jerry Pitts Racing	Ford	15.367	87.851
12	17	Buddy Shepherd	McGowan Motorsports	Toyota	15.382	87.765
13	42	Amber Slagle	Cook Racing Technologies	Toyota	15.412	87.594
14	4	Sean Hingorani	Nascimento Motorsports	Toyota	15.433	87.475
15	7	Takuma Koga	Jerry Pitts Racing	Toyota	15.583	86.633
16	13	Todd Souza	Central Coast Racing	Ford	15.606	86.505
17	41	Tyler Reif	Lowden Motorsports	Ford	15.697	86.004
18	66	Eric Rhead	66 Rhead Racing	Chevrolet	15.780	85.551
19	21	R. J. Smotherman	Lowden Motorsports	Ford	15.825	85.308
20	77	Nick Joanides	Performance P-1 Motorsports	Toyota	15.861	85.114
21	88	Bridget Burgess	BMI Racing	Chevrolet	15.917	84.815
22	05	David Smith	Shockwave Motorsports	Toyota	16.022	84.259
23	97	Sarah Burgess	BMI Racing	Chevrolet	16.199	83.338
24	85	Vince Little	Last Chance Racing	Chevrolet	16.255	83.051
25	39	Andrew Tuttle (R)	Last Chance Racing	Chevrolet	16.310	82.771
26	11	Chris Lowden	Lowden Motorsports	Chevrolet	16.356	82.539
Official qualifying results

== Race results ==
Fin.	St	#	Driver	Team	Make	Laps	Led	Status	Pts
1	1	71	Taylor Gray	David Gilliland Racing	Ford	158	157	Running	49
2	2	51	Andrés Pérez de Lara	David Gilliland Racing	Ford	158	0	Running	42
3	3	16	Landen Lewis	Bill McAnally Racing	Chevrolet	158	1	Running	42
4	5	12	Kyle Keller (R)	Kyle Keller Racing	Ford	158	0	Running	40
5	12	17	Buddy Shepherd	McGowan Motorsports	Toyota	158	0	Running	39
6	4	9	Tanner Reif (R)	Sunrise Ford Racing	Ford	158	0	Running	38
7	6	84	Bradley Erickson	Naake-Klauer Motorsports	Ford	158	0	Running	37
8	7	6	Jake Drew	Sunrise Ford Racing	Ford	158	0	Running	36
9	11	5	Jacob Smith	Jerry Pitts Racing	Ford	158	0	Running	35
10	16	13	Todd Souza	Central Coast Racing	Ford	158	0	Running	34
11	8	54	Joey Iest	Naake-Klauer Motorsports	Ford	158	0	Running	33
12	21	88	Bridget Burgess	BMI Racing	Chevrolet	158	0	Running	32
13	18	66	Eric Rhead	66 Rhead Racing	Chevrolet	158	0	Running	31
14	10	99	Cole Moore	Bill McAnally Racing	Chevrolet	158	0	Running	30
15	20	77	Nick Joanides	Performance P-1 Motorsports	Toyota	158	0	Running	29
16	24	85	Vince Little	Last Chance Racing	Chevrolet	157	0	Running	28
17	26	97	Sarah Burgess	BMI Racing	Chevrolet	153	0	Running	27
18	17	41	Tyler Reif	Lowden Motorsports	Ford	148	0	Accident	26
19	25	05	David Smith	Shockwave Motorsports	Toyota	141	0	Running	25
20	13	42	Amber Slagle	Cook Racing Technologies	Toyota	129	0	Running	24
21	15	7	Takuma Koga	Jerry Pitts Racing	Toyota	90	0	Ignition	23
22	19	21	R. J. Smotherman	Lowden Motorsports	Chevrolet	90	0	Oil Leak	22
23	9	02	Katie Hettinger	Young's Motorsports	Chevrolet	15	0	Accident	21
24	23	11	Chris Lowden	Lowden Motorsports	Chevrolet	15	0	Accident	20
25	14	4	Sean Hingorani	Nascimento Motorsports	Toyota	10	0	Handling	19
26	22	39	Andrew Tuttle (R)	Last Chance Racing	Chevrolet	4	0	Engine	18
Official race results

Previous race: 2022 NAPA Auto Parts 150 (All American)	ARCA Menards Series West; 2022 season	Next race: 2022 Desert Diamond Casino West Valley 100
