= 2022 Desert Diamond Casino West Valley 100 =

11th race of the 2022 ARCA Menards Series West

Race details
- Race 11 of 11 of the 2022 ARCA Menards Series West
- Date: November 4, 2022
- Official name: 50th Annual Desert Diamond Casino West Valley 100
- Location: Phoenix Raceway, Avondale, Arizona
- Course: Permanent racing facility
- Course length: 1 miles (1.6 km)
- Distance: 107 laps, 107 mi (172 km)
- Scheduled distance: 100 laps, 100 mi (160 km)
- Average speed: 75.117 mph (120.889 km/h)

Pole position
| Driver | Sammy Smith | Kyle Busch Motorsports |
- Time: 26.570

Most laps led
| Driver | Sammy Smith | Kyle Busch Motorsports |
- Laps: 75

Winner
| No. 18 | Sammy Smith | Kyle Busch Motorsports |

Television in the United States
- Network: USA Network (Delayed until November 11, 2022); FloSports (Live Stream)
- Announcers: Jim Tretow and Phil Parsons

Radio in the United States
- Radio: Motor Racing Network

The 2022 Desert Diamond Casino West Valley 100 was the 11th and final stock car race of the 2022 ARCA Menards Series West season, and the 50th iteration of the event. The race was held on Friday, November 4, 2022, in Avondale, Arizona at Phoenix Raceway, a 1 mile (1.6 km) permanent tr-oval shaped racetrack. The race was increased from 100 laps to 107 laps, due to an overtime finish. Sammy Smith, driving for Kyle Busch Motorsports, would overcome a penalty, and earn his first career ARCA Menards Series West win. He would also dominate the majority of the race, leading 75 laps. To fill out the podium, Jesse Love, driving for Venturini Motorsports, and Andrés Pérez de Lara, driving for David Gilliland Racing, would finish second and third, respectively.

By virtue of starting the race, Jake Drew, driving for Sunrise Ford Racing, would claim the 2022 ARCA Menards Series West championship. This was Drew's first championship in the series, along with the first championship for Sunrise Ford Racing since 2018. It would also end up being Sunrise Ford Racing's final championship, as the team announced that they would shut down at the end of 2022.

== Background ==
Phoenix Raceway is a 1-mile, low-banked tri-oval race track located in Avondale, Arizona, near Phoenix. The motorsport track opened in 1964 and currently hosts two NASCAR race weekends annually including the final championship race since 2020. Phoenix Raceway has also hosted the CART, IndyCar Series, USAC and the WeatherTech SportsCar Championship. The raceway is currently owned and operated by NASCAR.

Phoenix Raceway is home to two annual NASCAR race weekends, one of 13 facilities on the NASCAR schedule to host more than one race weekend a year. It first joined the NASCAR Cup Series schedule in 1988 as a late season event, and in 2005 the track was given a spring date. The now-NASCAR Camping World Truck Series was added in 1995 and the now-NASCAR Xfinity Series began running there in 1999.

NASCAR announced that its championship weekend events would be run at Phoenix for 2020, marking the first time since NASCAR inaugurated the weekend that Homestead-Miami Speedway would not be the host track. The track will also hold the championship for the 2021 NASCAR Cup season.

=== Entry list ===
- (R) denotes rookie driver

| # | Driver | Team | Make |
|---|---|---|---|
| 01 | Zach Herrin | Fast Track Racing | Toyota |
| 1 | Jake Finch | Phoenix Racing | Toyota |
| 02 | Katie Hettinger | Young's Motorsports | Chevrolet |
| 04 | Sean Hingorani | Nascimento Motorsports | Chevrolet |
| 4 | Sebastian Arias | Nascimento Motorsports | Chevrolet |
| 05 | David Smith | Shockwave Motorsports | Toyota |
| 6 | Jake Drew | Sunrise Ford Racing | Ford |
| 7 | Takuma Koga | Jerry Pitts Racing | Toyota |
| 9 | Tanner Reif (R) | Sunrise Ford Racing | Ford |
| 11 | Chris Lowden | Lowden Motorsports | Chevrolet |
| 13 | Todd Souza | Central Coast Racing | Ford |
| 15 | Parker Chase | Venturini Motorsports | Toyota |
| 16 | Landen Lewis | Bill McAnally Racing | Chevrolet |
| 17 | Buddy Shepherd | McGowan Motorsports | Toyota |
| 18 | Sammy Smith | Kyle Busch Motorsports | Toyota |
| 20 | Jesse Love | Venturini Motorsports | Toyota |
| 21 | R. J. Smotherman | Lowden Motorsports | Chevrolet |
| 25 | Conner Jones | Venturini Motorsports | Toyota |
| 27 | Bobby Hillis Jr. | Fierce Creature Racing | Chevrolet |
| 40 | Carson Hocevar | Niece Motorsports | Chevrolet |
| 41 | Tyler Reif | Lowden Motorsports | Chevrolet |
| 42 | Christian Rose | Cook Racing Technologies | Chevrolet |
| 51 | Andrés Pérez de Lara | David Gilliland Racing | Ford |
| 54 | Joey Iest | Naake-Klauer Motorsports | Ford |
| 55 | Landon Pembelton | Venturini Motorsports | Toyota |
| 70 | Kyle Keller (R) | Kyle Keller Racing | Chevrolet |
| 71 | Taylor Gray | David Gilliland Racing | Ford |
| 84 | Bradley Erickson | Naake-Klauer Motorsports | Ford |
| 88 | Bridget Burgess | BMI Racing | Chevrolet |
| 99 | Cole Moore | Bill McAnally Racing | Chevrolet |
Official entry list

== Practice/Qualifying ==
Practice and qualifying will both be combined into one 75-minute session, with a driver's fastest time counting as their qualifying lap. It was held on Thursday, November 3, at 6:30 PM MST. Sammy Smith, driving for Kyle Busch Motorsports, would score the pole for the race, with a lap of 26.570, and an average speed of 135.491 mph (218.052 km/h).

| Pos. | # | Driver | Team | Make | Time | Speed |
|---|---|---|---|---|---|---|
| 1 | 18 | Sammy Smith | Kyle Busch Motorsports | Toyota | 26.570 | 135.491 |
| 2 | 20 | Jesse Love | Venturini Motorsports | Toyota | 27.039 | 133.141 |
| 3 | 51 | Andrés Pérez de Lara | David Gilliland Racing | Ford | 27.087 | 132.905 |
| 4 | 71 | Taylor Gray | David Gilliland Racing | Ford | 27.104 | 132.822 |
| 5 | 25 | Conner Jones | Venturini Motorsports | Toyota | 27.359 | 131.584 |
| 6 | 1 | Jake Finch | Phoenix Racing | Toyota | 27.383 | 131.468 |
| 7 | 40 | Carson Hocevar | Niece Motorsports | Chevrolet | 27.635 | 130.270 |
| 8 | 84 | Bradley Erickson | Naake-Klauer Motorsports | Ford | 27.809 | 129.454 |
| 9 | 04 | Sean Hingorani | Nascimento Motorsports | Chevrolet | 27.817 | 129.417 |
| 10 | 17 | Buddy Shepherd | McGowan Motorsports | Toyota | 27.875 | 129.148 |
| 11 | 15 | Parker Chase | Venturini Motorsports | Toyota | 27.933 | 128.880 |
| 12 | 55 | Landon Pembelton | Venturini Motorsports | Toyota | 27.943 | 128.834 |
| 13 | 9 | Tanner Reif (R) | Sunrise Ford Racing | Ford | 27.949 | 128.806 |
| 14 | 16 | Landen Lewis | Bill McAnally Racing | Chevrolet | 27.972 | 128.700 |
| 15 | 6 | Jake Drew | Sunrise Ford Racing | Ford | 28.061 | 128.292 |
| 16 | 13 | Todd Souza | Central Coast Racing | Ford | 28.102 | 128.105 |
| 17 | 54 | Joey Iest | Naake-Klauer Motorsports | Ford | 28.175 | 127.773 |
| 18 | 42 | Christian Rose | Cook Racing Technologies | Toyota | 28.235 | 127.501 |
| 19 | 70 | Kyle Keller (R) | Kyle Keller Racing | Ford | 28.259 | 127.393 |
| 20 | 02 | Katie Hettinger | Young's Motorsports | Chevrolet | 28.329 | 127.078 |
| 21 | 99 | Cole Moore | Bill McAnally Racing | Chevrolet | 28.379 | 126.854 |
| 22 | 7 | Takuma Koga | Jerry Pitts Racing | Toyota | 28.664 | 125.593 |
| 23 | 4 | Sebastian Arias | Nascimento Motorsports | Chevrolet | 28.911 | 124.520 |
| 24 | 41 | Tyler Reif | Lowden Motorsports | Chevrolet | 28.940 | 124.395 |
| 25 | 01 | Zach Herrin | Fast Track Racing | Toyota | 29.129 | 123.588 |
| 26 | 21 | R. J. Smotherman | Lowden Motorsports | Chevrolet | 29.279 | 122.955 |
| 27 | 05 | David Smith | Shockwave Motorsports | Toyota | 29.405 | 122.428 |
| 28 | 88 | Bridget Burgess | BMI Racing | Chevrolet | 29.454 | 122.224 |
| 29 | 27 | Bobby Hillis Jr. | Fierce Creature Racing | Chevrolet | 30.820 | 116.807 |
| 30 | 11 | Chris Lowden | Lowden Motorsports | Chevrolet | 31.378 | 114.730 |
Official practice/qualifying results

== Race results ==
| Fin. | St | # | Driver | Team | Make | Laps | Led | Status | Pts |
|---|---|---|---|---|---|---|---|---|---|
| 1 | 1 | 18 | Sammy Smith | Kyle Busch Motorsports | Toyota | 107 | 75 | Running | 49 |
| 2 | 2 | 20 | Jesse Love | Venturini Motorsports | Toyota | 107 | 0 | Running | 42 |
| 3 | 3 | 51 | Andrés Pérez de Lara | David Gilliland Racing | Ford | 107 | 31 | Running | 42 |
| 4 | 12 | 55 | Landon Pembelton | Venturini Motorsports | Toyota | 107 | 0 | Running | 40 |
| 5 | 16 | 13 | Todd Souza | Central Coast Racing | Ford | 107 | 0 | Running | 39 |
| 6 | 14 | 16 | Landen Lewis | Bill McAnally Racing | Chevrolet | 107 | 0 | Running | 38 |
| 7 | 8 | 84 | Bradley Erickson | Naake-Klauer Motorsports | Ford | 107 | 0 | Running | 37 |
| 8 | 11 | 15 | Parker Chase | Venturini Motorsports | Toyota | 107 | 0 | Running | 36 |
| 9 | 6 | 1 | Jake Finch | Phoenix Racing | Toyota | 107 | 0 | Running | 35 |
| 10 | 13 | 9 | Tanner Reif (R) | Sunrise Ford Racing | Ford | 107 | 0 | Running | 34 |
| 11 | 10 | 17 | Buddy Shepherd | McGowan Motorsports | Toyota | 107 | 0 | Running | 33 |
| 12 | 24 | 41 | Tyler Reif | Lowden Motorsports | Chevrolet | 107 | 0 | Running | 32 |
| 13 | 15 | 6 | Jake Drew | Sunrise Ford Racing | Ford | 107 | 0 | Running | 31 |
| 14 | 21 | 99 | Cole Moore | Bill McAnally Racing | Chevrolet | 107 | 0 | Running | 30 |
| 15 | 22 | 7 | Takuma Koga | Jerry Pitts Racing | Toyota | 107 | 0 | Running | 29 |
| 16 | 23 | 4 | Sebastian Arias | Nascimento Motorsports | Chevrolet | 107 | 0 | Running | 28 |
| 17 | 28 | 88 | Bridget Burgess | BMI Racing | Chevrolet | 107 | 0 | Running | 27 |
| 18 | 25 | 01 | Zach Herrin | Fast Track Racing | Toyota | 107 | 0 | Running | 26 |
| 19 | 20 | 02 | Katie Hettinger | Young's Motorsports | Chevrolet | 107 | 0 | Running | 25 |
| 20 | 27 | 05 | David Smith | Shockwave Motorsports | Toyota | 105 | 0 | Running | 24 |
| 21 | 18 | 42 | Christian Rose | Cook Racing Technologies | Toyota | 100 | 0 | Accident | 23 |
| 22 | 29 | 27 | Bobby Hillis Jr. | Fierce Creature Racing | Chevrolet | 95 | 0 | Running | 22 |
| 23 | 9 | 04 | Sean Hingorani | Nascimento Motorsports | Chevrolet | 94 | 0 | Accident | 21 |
| 24 | 17 | 54 | Joey Iest | Naake-Klauer Motorsports | Ford | 77 | 0 | Accident | 20 |
| 25 | 19 | 70 | Kyle Keller (R) | Kyle Keller Racing | Chevrolet | 77 | 0 | Running | 19 |
| 26 | 26 | 21 | R. J. Smotherman | Lowden Motorsports | Chevrolet | 66 | 0 | Ignition | 18 |
| 27 | 4 | 71 | Taylor Gray | David Gilliland Racing | Ford | 51 | 1 | Accident | 18 |
| 28 | 5 | 25 | Conner Jones | Venturini Motorsports | Toyota | 50 | 0 | Accident | 16 |
| 29 | 7 | 40 | Carson Hocevar | Niece Motorsports | Chevrolet | 19 | 0 | Track Bar | 15 |
| 30 | 30 | 11 | Chris Lowden | Lowden Motorsports | Chevrolet | 0 | 0 | Did Not Start | 14 |
Official race results

| Previous race: 2022 Star Nursery 150 | ARCA Menards Series; 2022 season | Next race: 2023 General Tire 150 (Phoenix) |
