= 2023 West Coast Stock Car Motorsports Hall of Fame 150 =

2nd race of the 2023 ARCA Menards Series West

Race details
- Race 2 of 12 of the 2023 ARCA Menards Series West
- Date: April 1, 2023
- Official name: 22nd Annual West Coast Stock Car Motorsports Hall of Fame 150
- Location: Irwindale Speedway in Irwindale, California
- Course: Permanent racing facility
- Course length: 0.50 miles (0.80 km)
- Distance: 150 laps, 75 mi (120 km)
- Scheduled distance: 150 laps, 75 mi (120 km)
- Average speed: 67.890 mph (109.258 km/h)

Pole position
Driver	Trevor Huddleston	High Point Racing
- Time: 18.127

Most laps led
Driver	Trevor Huddleston	High Point Racing
- Laps: 72

Winner
No. 15	Sean Hingorani	Venturini Motorsports

Television in the United States
- Network: FloRacing
- Announcers: Charles Krall

Radio in the United States
- Radio: ARCA Racing Network

The 2023 West Coast Stock Car Motorsports Hall of Fame 150 was the 2nd stock car race of the 2023 ARCA Menards Series West season, and the 22nd running of the event. The race was held on Saturday, April 1, 2023, at Irwindale Speedway in Irwindale, California, a 0.50 mile (0.80 km) permanent asphalt oval shaped short track. The race took the scheduled 150 laps to complete. In an action-packed race, Sean Hingorani, driving for Venturini Motorsports, would hold off a challenging Landen Lewis throughout the entire race, and led the final 16 laps of the race to earn his first career ARCA Menards Series West win. Pole-sitter Trevor Huddleston dominated the early portions of the race, leading the first 72 laps, before falling back in the final stage and finishing 4th. Hingorani led 61 laps and had a hard-fought battle with Landen Lewis throughout the remainder of the event. To fill out the podium, Tyler Reif, driving for Lowden Jackson Motorsports, would finish in 3rd, respectively.

== Report ==
=== Background ===
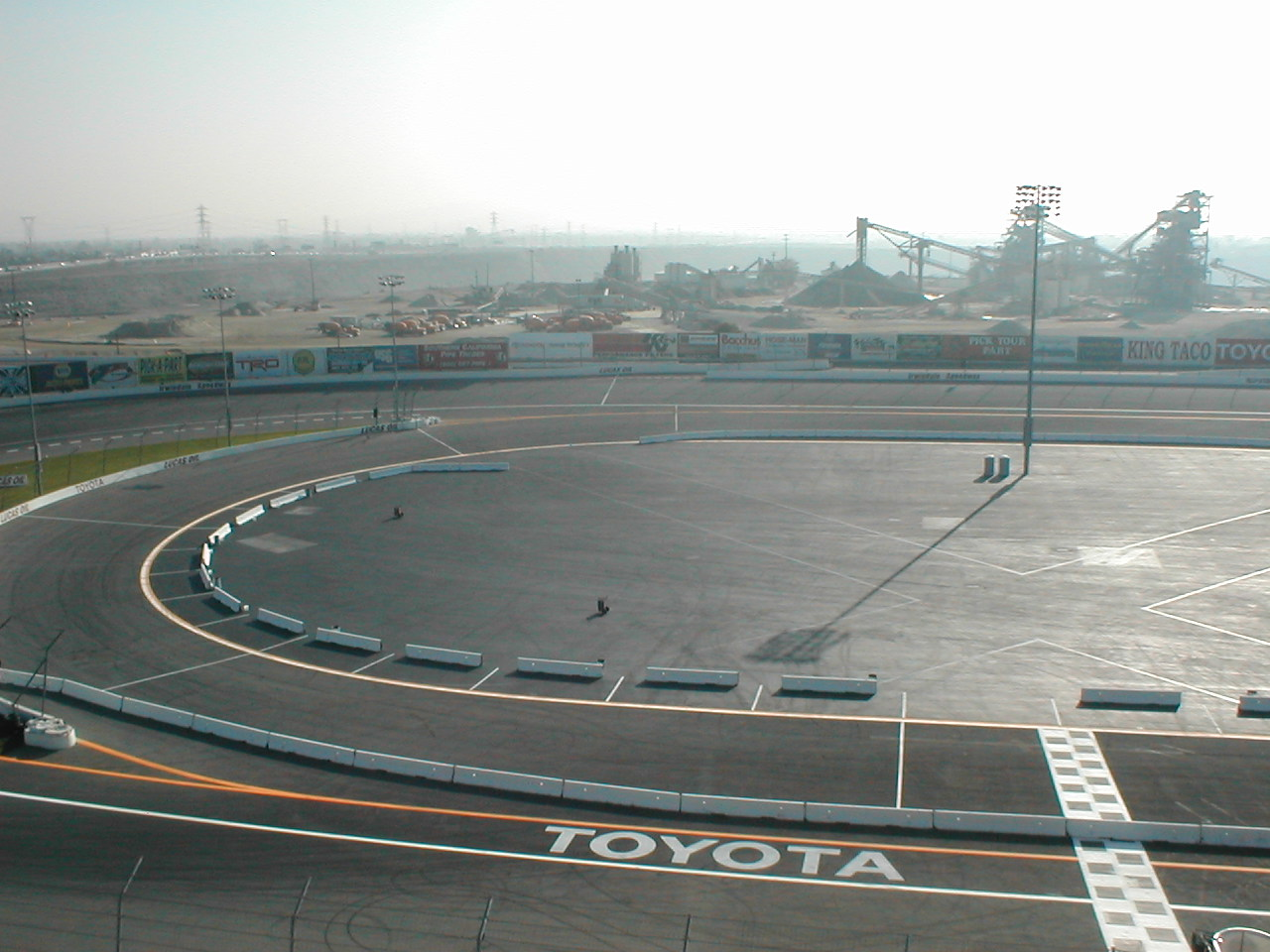
Irwindale Speedway, the circuit where the race was held.

The Irwindale Speedway & Event Center (a.k.a. Irwindale Speedway, Irwindale Dragstrip, or "The House of Drift") is a motorsports facility located in Irwindale, California, United States. It opened on March 27, 1999, under the official name Irwindale Speedway. Toyota purchased the naming rights to the facility in 2008, and from that time until 2011 it was also known as the Toyota Speedway at Irwindale.

The speedway features banked, paved 1/2- and 1/3-mile oval tracks and a 1/8-mile drag strip. The property is primarily used for NASCAR races such as ARCA Menards Series West and Whelen All-American Series events. In late 2011, NASCAR announced it was dropping Toyota Speedway from its schedule. The company that managed the track, Irwindale Speedway LLC, filed Chapter 7 bankruptcy on February 13, 2012.

==== Entry list ====
- (R) denotes rookie driver.

#	Driver	Team	Make	Sponsor
04	Ethan Nascimento (R)	Nascimento Motorsports	Toyota	RAILBAR Protein Bar
4	Eric Nascimento	Nascimento Motorsports	Chevrolet	Fidelity Capital / RJ's Paintshop
05	David Smith (R)	Shockwave Motorsports	Toyota	Shockwave Marine Suspension Seating
7	Takuma Koga	Jerry Pitts Racing	Toyota	GR Garage
13	Todd Souza	Central Coast Racing	Ford	Central Coast Cabinets
15	Sean Hingorani (R)	Venturini Motorsports	Toyota	Mobil 1
16	Tanner Reif	Bill McAnally Racing	Chevrolet	NAPA Auto Care
17	Landen Lewis	McGowan Motorsports	Toyota	American Resurfacing Inc. / MMI
27	Bobby Hillis Jr.	Fierce Creature Racing	Chevrolet	First Impression Press / Camping World
41	Tyler Reif (R)	Lowden Jackson Motorsports	Ford	Power Gen Components / Stoney's
46	R. J. Smotherman (R)	Lowden Jackson Motorsports	Ford	Country AF Radio / Stoney's
50	Trevor Huddleston	High Point Racing	Ford	High Point Racing
55	Jake Bollman	High Point Racing	Ford	High Point Racing
70	Kyle Keller	Jerry Pitts Racing	Toyota	EverReady Health / Star Nursery
77	Nick Joanides	Performance P–1 Motorsports	Toyota	Jan's Towing / King Taco
88	Bradley Erickson (R)	Naake-Klauer Motorsports	Ford	L&S Framing
Official entry list

== Practice ==
The first and only practice session was held on Saturday, April 1, at 3:30 PM PST, and would last for 1 hour. Bradley Erickson, driving for Naake-Klauer Motorsports, would set the fastest time in the session, with a lap of 18.432, and a speed of 97.656 mph (157.162 km/h).

Pos.	#	Driver	Team	Make	Time	Speed
1	88	Bradley Erickson (R)	Naake-Klauer Motorsports	Ford	18.432	97.656
2	17	Landen Lewis	McGowan Motorsports	Toyota	18.492	97.339
3	50	Trevor Huddleston	High Point Racing	Ford	18.538	97.098
Full practice results

== Qualifying ==
Qualifying was held on Saturday, April 1, at 5:00 PM PST. The qualifying system used is a multi-car, multi-lap based system. All drivers will be on track for a 20-minute timed session, and whoever sets the fastest time in the session will win the pole.

Trevor Huddleston, driving for High Point Racing, would score the pole for the race, with a lap of 18.127, and a speed of 99.299 mph (159.806 km/h).

=== Qualifying results ===
Pos.	#	Driver	Team	Make	Time	Speed
1	50	Trevor Huddleston	High Point Racing	Ford	18.127	99.299
2	88	Bradley Erickson (R)	Naake-Klauer Motorsports	Ford	18.204	98.879
3	15	Sean Hingorani (R)	Venturini Motorsports	Toyota	18.375	97.959
4	17	Landen Lewis	McGowan Motorsports	Toyota	18.392	97.869
5	16	Tanner Reif	Bill McAnally Racing	Chevrolet	18.445	97.587
6	55	Jake Bollman	High Point Racing	Ford	18.511	97.239
7	41	Tyler Reif (R)	Lowden Jackson Motorsports	Ford	18.511	97.239
8	70	Kyle Keller	Jerry Pitts Racing	Toyota	18.562	96.972
9	04	Ethan Nascimento (R)	Nascimento Motorsports	Toyota	18.566	96.951
10	4	Eric Nascimento	Nascimento Motorsports	Chevrolet	18.568	96.941
11	13	Todd Souza	Central Coast Racing	Ford	18.581	96.873
12	46	R. J. Smotherman (R)	Lowden Jackson Motorsports	Ford	18.872	95.379
13	7	Takuma Koga	Jerry Pitts Racing	Toyota	18.898	95.248
14	05	David Smith (R)	Shockwave Motorsports	Toyota	19.284	93.342
15	77	Nick Joanides	Performance P–1 Motorsports	Toyota	19.595	91.860
16	27	Bobby Hillis Jr.	Fierce Creature Racing	Chevrolet	19.858	90.644
Official qualifying results

== Race results ==
Fin	St	#	Driver	Team	Make	Laps	Led	Status	Pts
1	3	15	Sean Hingorani (R)	Venturini Motorsports	Toyota	150	61	Running	47
2	4	17	Landen Lewis	McGowan Motorsports	Toyota	150	17	Running	43
3	7	41	Tyler Reif (R)	Lowden Jackson Motorsports	Ford	150	0	Running	41
4	1	50	Trevor Huddleston	High Point Racing	Ford	150	72	Running	43
5	5	16	Tanner Reif	Bill McAnally Racing	Chevrolet	150	0	Running	39
6	8	70	Kyle Keller	Jerry Pitts Racing	Toyota	150	0	Running	38
7	13	7	Takuma Koga	Jerry Pitts Racing	Toyota	148	0	Running	37
8	2	88	Bradley Erickson (R)	Naake-Klauer Motorsports	Ford	146	0	Running	36
9	16	27	Bobby Hillis Jr.	Fierce Creature Racing	Chevrolet	145	0	Running	35
10	14	05	David Smith (R)	Shockwave Motorsports	Toyota	141	0	Running	34
11	11	13	Todd Souza	Central Coast Racing	Ford	138	0	Running	33
12	6	55	Jake Bollman	High Point Racing	Ford	111	0	Accident	32
13	9	04	Ethan Nascimento (R)	Nascimento Motorsports	Toyota	109	0	Mechanical	31
14	10	4	Eric Nascimento	Nascimento Motorsports	Chevrolet	96	0	Transmission	30
15	12	46	R. J. Smotherman (R)	Lowden Jackson Motorsports	Ford	94	0	Accident	29
16	15	77	Nick Joanides	Performance P–1 Motorsports	Toyota	94	0	Accident	28
Official race results

== Standings after the race ==
Drivers' Championship standings

	Pos	Driver	Points
	1	Tyler Reif	88
	2	Landen Lewis	86 (-2)
6	3	Trevor Huddleston	77 (—11)
1	4	Kyle Keller	77 (—11)
2	5	Bradley Erickson	76 (—12)
10	6	Sean Hingorani	75 (—13)
6	7	Tanner Reif	71 (—17)
4	8	Todd Souza	66 (—22)
10	9	Takuma Koga	62 (—26)
7	10	David Smith	61 (—27)

- Note: Only the first 10 positions are included for the driver standings.

Previous race: 2023 General Tire 150	ARCA Menards Series West; 2023 season	Next race: 2023 NAPA Auto Parts BlueDEF 150 (Kern County)
