= Stefan Rzesnowiecky =

American racing driver (1992–2023)

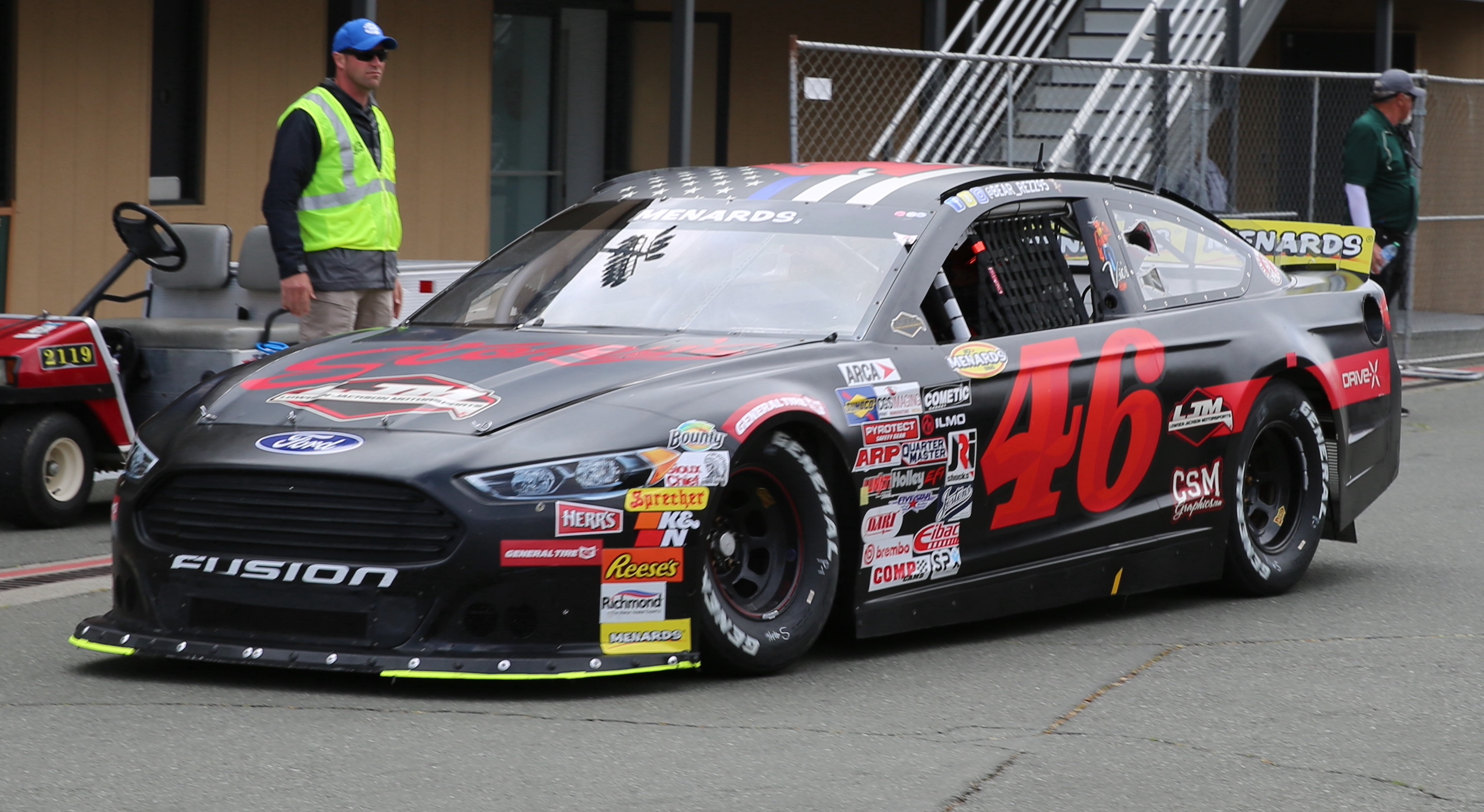
- Rzesnowiecky's No. 46 ARCA car at Sonoma Raceway in 2023
- Born: Stefan Rzenowiecky III; May 10, 1992; Las Vegas, Nevada, U.S.
- Died: November 28, 2023 (aged 31); Las Vegas, Nevada, U.S.

ARCA Menards Series career
- 1 race run over 1 year
- Best finish: 99th (2011)
- First race: 2011 Messina Wildlife Animal Stopper 150 (Chicagoland)
Wins	Top tens	Poles
0	0	0

ARCA Menards Series West career
- 1 race run over 1 year
- Best finish: 72nd (2023)
- First race: 2023 General Tire 200 (Sonoma)
Wins	Top tens	Poles
0	0	0
- Statistics up to date as of March 26, 2024.

Stefan "Bear" Rzesnowiecky III (May 10, 1992 – November 28, 2023) was an American professional stock car racing driver who last competed part-time in the ARCA Menards Series West, driving the No. 46 Ford for Lowden Jackson Motorsports.

== Racing career ==
From 2006 to 2007, Rzesnowiecky would compete in the ASA Truck Series, running only one race at Lucas Oil I-10 Speedway, where he would finish 8th, before running multiple races the following year, winning one race at Havasu 95 Speedway. He would then run select one-off events in the SRL Spears Southwest Tour Series between 2008 and 2010, winning in his first start at the Las Vegas Motor Speedway Bullring in 2008.

In 2011, Rzesnowiecky would run four events in the series, achieving a season best finish of 14th at All American Speedway. He would also make his debut in the Lucas Oil Modified Series, running in three events with a best finish of seventh at Irwindale Speedway. It was also during this year that he would make his ARCA Racing Series at Chicagoland Speedway driving the No. 96 Dodge for the Richard Petty Driving Experience. He had originally received that ride as a reward for winning the third annual Richard Petty's Driver Search in December of the previous year. He would start and finish eleventh despite suffering a spin late in the race.

In 2018, Rzesnowiecky would return to the SRL Spears Southwest Tour Series, running one race at the Bullring In Las Vegas, finishing 22nd due to a penalty. He would return the following year, this time running three races with a best finish of 24th at Las Vegas in November due to a battery issue.

In 2023, Rzesnowiecky made his return to ARCA, this time in the ARCA Menards Series West race at Sonoma Raceway driving the No. 46 Ford for Lowden Jackson Motorsports as a late replacement for Kyle Sieg who was originally on the entry list in that car. After placing 23rd in the sole practice session, and not running a qualifying lap due to an engine issue, he would ultimately not make the start of the race due to the car spinning a bearing in practice and would be classified in 29th position.

== Motorsports career results ==
=== ARCA Racing Series ===
(key) (Bold – Pole position awarded by qualifying time. Italics – Pole position earned by points standings or practice time. * – Most laps led. ** – All laps led.)

ARCA Racing Series results
Year	Team	No.	Make	1	2	3	4	5	6	7	8	9	10	11	12	13	14	15	16	17	18	19	ARSC	Pts	Ref
2011	Richard Petty Driving Experience	96	Dodge	DAY	TAL	SLM	TOL	NJE	CHI; 11	POC	MCH	WIN	BLN	IOW	IRP	POC	ISF	MAD	DSF	SLM	KAN	TOL	99th	175	

==== ARCA Menards Series West ====
ARCA Menards Series West results
Year	Team	No.	Make	1	2	3	4	5	6	7	8	9	10	11	12	AMSWC	Pts	Ref
2023	Lowden Jackson Motorsports	46	Ford	PHO	IRW	KCR	PIR	SON; 29	IRW	SHA	EVG	AAS	LVS	MAD	PHO	72nd	15	
