= Derek Copeland =

American racing driver

- Born: January 28, 1991 (age 35); Anderson, California, U.S.

ARCA Menards Series West career
- 2 races run over 2 years
- ARCA West no., team: No. 80 (Derek Copeland Racing)
- Best finish: 56th (2023)
- First race: 2023 Shasta 150 (Shasta)
- Last race: 2024 Shasta 150 (Shasta)
Wins	Top tens	Poles
0	1	0
- Statistics up to date as of July 30, 2024.

Derek Copeland (born January 28, 1991) is an American professional stock car racing driver and team owner who competes part-time in the ARCA Menards Series West, driving the No. 80 Toyota for his own team, Derek Copeland Racing.

== Racing career ==
Copeland has previously competed in series such as the Pacific Challenge Series, the Rocky Mountain Challenge Series, the Super 6 Late Model Challenge Series, and the West Coast Sportsman Series.

In 2023, it was revealed that Copeland would make his debut in the ARCA Menards Series West at Shasta Speedway, driving the No. 80 Toyota for Brian Kamisky. After setting the thirteenth fastest time in the sole practice session, he started and finished in seventeenth place after failing to take the start. He returned to Shasta the following year, where after placing eighth in the lone practice session, he started fifth and finished one lap down in fourth place.

== Motorsports results ==
=== ARCA Menards Series West ===
(key) (Bold – Pole position awarded by qualifying time. Italics – Pole position earned by points standings or practice time. * – Most laps led. ** – All laps led.)

ARCA Menards Series West results
Year	Team	No.	Make	1	2	3	4	5	6	7	8	9	10	11	12	AMSWC	Pts	Ref
2023	Legal Limit Motorsports	80	Toyota	PHO	IRW	KCR	PIR	SON	IRW	SHA; 17	EVG	AAS	LVS	MAD	PHO	56th	27	
2024	Derek Copeland Racing	80	Toyota	PHO	KER	PIR	SON	IRW	IRW	SHA; 4	TRI	MAD	AAS	KER	PHO	41st	40	
