= Roxali Kamper =

American racing driver

- Born: August 30, 2007 (age 19); Saratoga Springs, Utah, U.S.

ARCA Menards Series West career
- 1 race run over 1 year
- Best finish: 69th (2023)
- First race: 2023 Portland 112 (Portland)
Wins	Top tens	Poles
0	0	0
- Statistics up to date as of January 29, 2025.

Roxali Kamper (born August 30, 2007) is an American professional stock car racing driver who has previously competed in the ARCA Menards Series West, having last driven the No. 39 Chevrolet for Last Chance Racing.

Kamper has also previously competed in the Domino's Pizza Legends Series, the INEX Winter Heat Series, and the Silver State Road Course Series.

== Motorsports results ==
=== ARCA Menards Series West ===
(key) (Bold – Pole position awarded by qualifying time. Italics – Pole position earned by points standings or practice time. * – Most laps led. ** – All laps led.)

ARCA Menards Series West results
Year	Team	No.	Make	1	2	3	4	5	6	7	8	9	10	11	12	AMSWC	Pts	Ref
2023	Last Chance Racing	39	Chevy	PHO	IRW	KCR	PIR; 24	SON	IRW	SHA	EVG	AAS	LVS	MAD	PHO	69th	20	
