= Greg Potts =

American racing driver

- Born: November 12, 1958 (age 67); Manteca, California, U.S.

ARCA Menards Series West career
- 1 race run over 1 year
- Best finish: 49th (2023)
- First race: 2023 Star Nursery 150 (LVMS Bullring)
Wins	Top tens	Poles
0	0	0
- Statistics up to date as of January 29, 2025.

Greg Potts (born November 12, 1958) is an American professional stock car racing driver who has previously competed in the ARCA Menards Series West, having last driven the No. 21 Toyota for Nascimento Motorsports.

Potts has also previously competed in series such as the NASCAR Southwest Series, the SRL Spears Southwest Tour Series, the Shell Tri-Track Challenge, and the Westcar Late Model Series.

== Motorsports results ==
=== ARCA Menards Series West ===
(key) (Bold – Pole position awarded by qualifying time. Italics – Pole position earned by points standings or practice time. * – Most laps led. ** – All laps led.)

ARCA Menards Series West results
Year	Team	No.	Make	1	2	3	4	5	6	7	8	9	10	11	12	AMSWC	Pts	Ref
2023	Nascimento Motorsports	21	Toyota	PHO	IRW	KCR	PIR	SON	IRW	SHA	EVG	AAS	LVS; 12	MAD	PHO	49th	32	
