= Jacob Smith (racing driver) =

American racing driver (born 2004)

- Born: November 1, 2004 (age 22); Eagle, Idaho, U.S.

ARCA Menards Series West career
- 2 races run over 2 years
- Best finish: 46th (2023)
- First race: 2022 Star Nursery 150 (LVMS Bullring)
- Last race: 2023 NAPA Auto Parts ARCA 150 (Evergreen)
Wins	Top tens	Poles
0	2	0
- Statistics up to date as of January 29, 2025.

Jacob Smith (born November 1, 2004) is an American professional stock car racing driver who has competed in the ARCA Menards Series West from 2022 to 2023, having last driven the No. 41 Ford for Lowden Jackson Motorsports.

Smith has also previously competed in the North West Tour Truck Series, the South West Tour Truck Series, and the Speed Tour Regional Sprintcar Series.

== Motorsports results ==
=== ARCA Menards Series West ===
(key) (Bold – Pole position awarded by qualifying time. Italics – Pole position earned by points standings or practice time. * – Most laps led. ** – All laps led.)

ARCA Menards Series West results
Year	Team	No.	Make	1	2	3	4	5	6	7	8	9	10	11	12	AMSWC	Pts	Ref
2022	Jerry Pitts Racing	5	Ford	PHO	IRW	KCR	PIR	SON	IRW	EVG	PIR	AAS	LVS; 9	PHO		56th	35	
2023	Lowden Jackson Motorsports	41	Ford	PHO	IRW	KCR	PIR	SON	IRW	SHA	EVG; 8	AAS	LVS	MAD	PHO	46th	36	
