= Brian Kamisky =

American racing driver

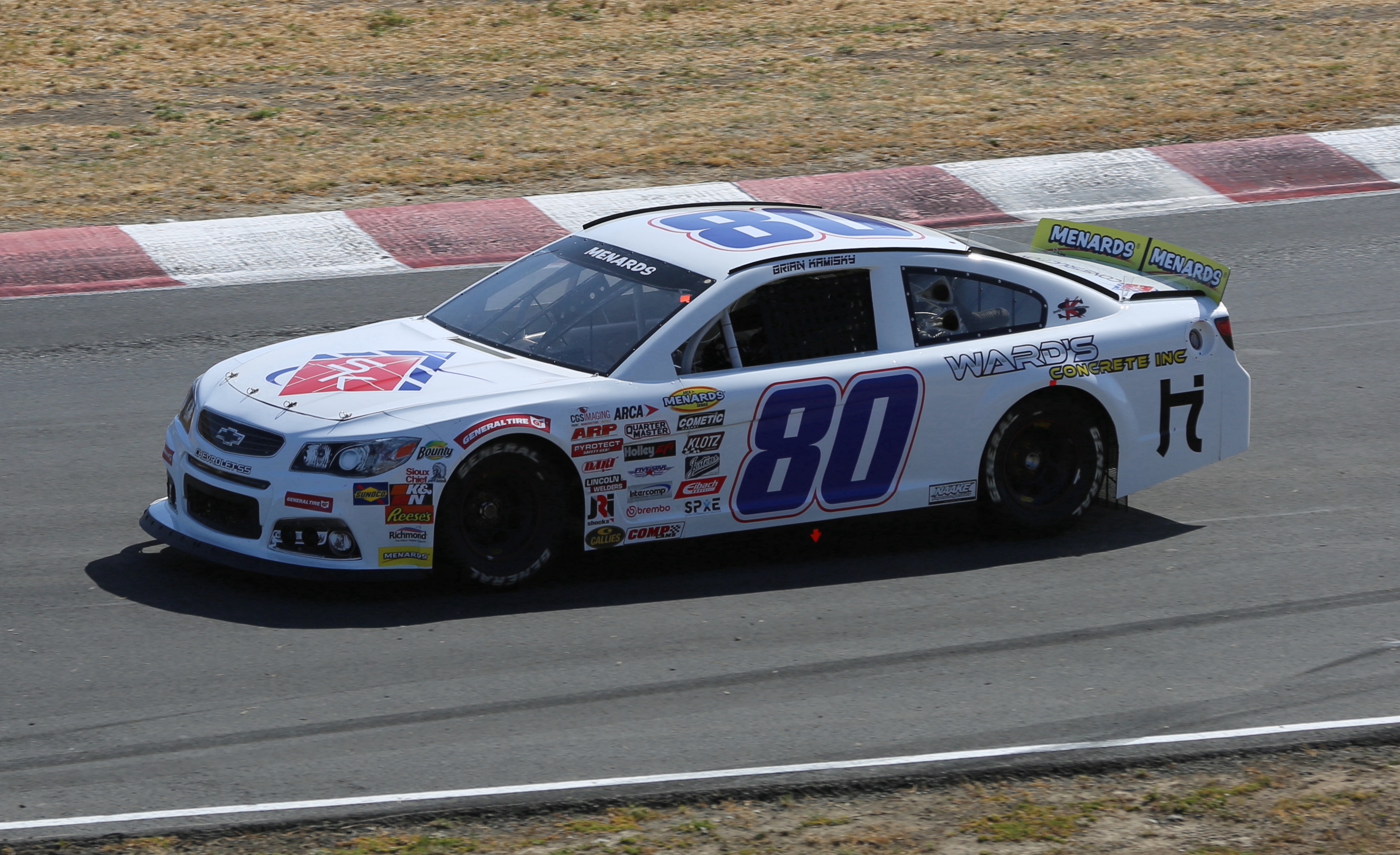
- Kamisky's's No. 80 ARCA car at Sonoma Raceway in 2024
- Born: September 8, 1980 (age 46); Anderson, California, U.S.

ARCA Menards Series West career
- 9 races run over 5 years
- Best finish: 18th (2021)
- First race: 2020 Eneos/Sunrise Ford Twin 30 Race#1 (Toole)
- Last race: 2024 General Tire 200 (Sonoma)
| Wins | Top tens | Poles |
|---|---|---|
| 0 | 3 | 0 |
- Statistics up to date as of June 11, 2024.

Brian Kamisky (born September 8, 1980) is an American professional stock car racing driver who last competed part-time in the ARCA Menards Series West, driving the No. 80 Chevrolet for Legal Limit Motorsports.

== Racing career ==
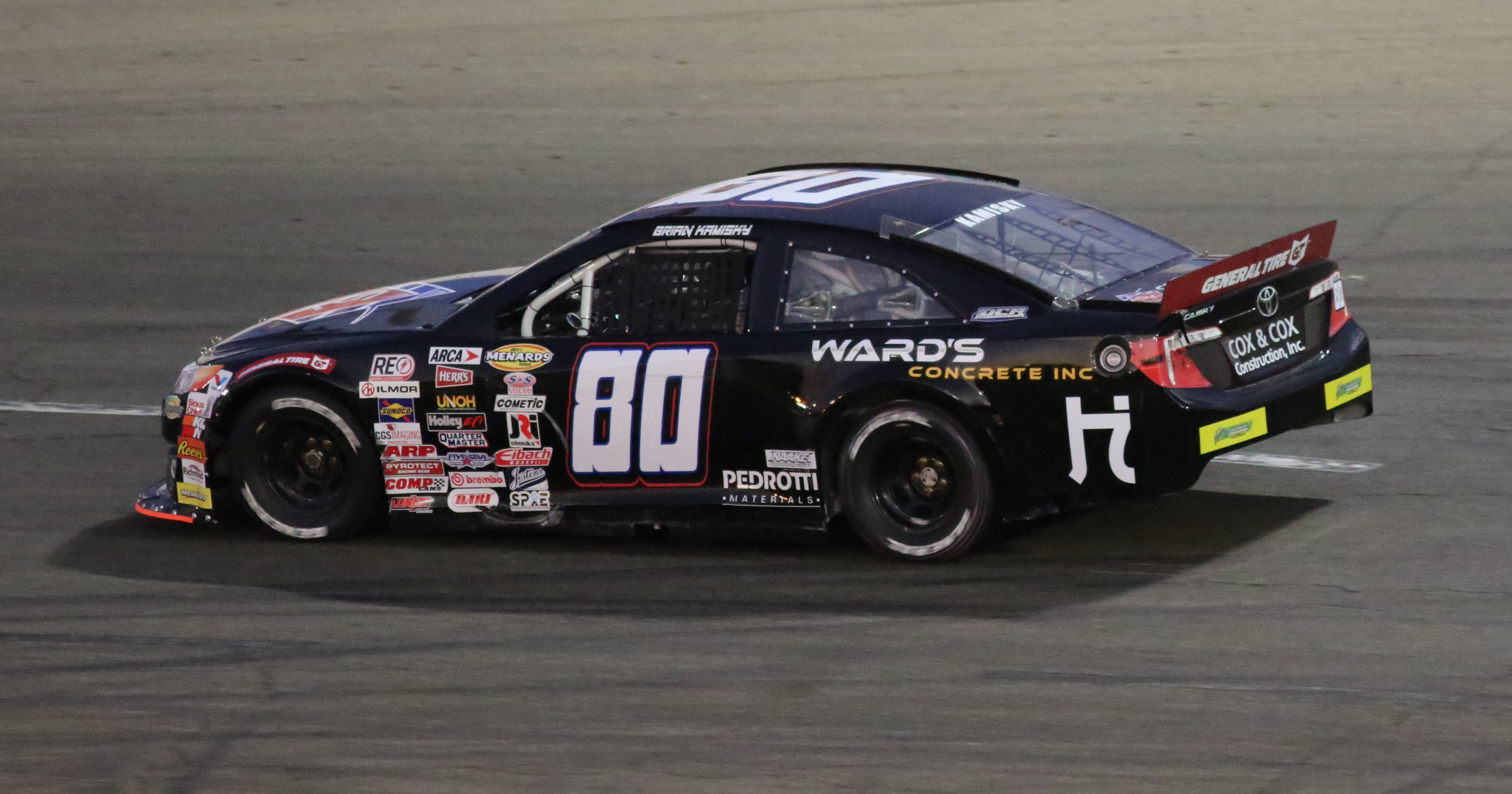
Kamisky's No. 80 car at All American Speedway in 2021

In 2020, Kamisky made his debut in the ARCA Menards Series West at Miller Motorsports Park. Driving the No. 80 Chevrolet for his own team, he finished eighth and ninth in both doubleheader races. In 2021, he competed in four races, driving a Chevrolet at Sonoma Raceway, and driving a Toyota in his following races. Across the year, he achieved a best finish of thirteenth at All American Speedway. For the following year, he attempted two races, failing to start the race at Sonoma, and finishing ninth at Roseville.

In 2023, Kamisky competed at Sonoma again, After placing sixteenth in the sole practice session, he qualified in 21st, but went on to finish in 22nd due to an axle issue late in the race. It was also during this year that he also served as a crew chief for Derek Copeland at Shasta Speedway. He returned to Sonoma the following year, where after placing twentieth in the lone practice session, he qualified in nineteenth, and led three laps but ultimately finished 21st after suffering a mechanical failure during a late restart.

== Motorsports results ==
=== ARCA Menards Series West ===
(key) (Bold – Pole position awarded by qualifying time. Italics – Pole position earned by points standings or practice time. * – Most laps led.)

ARCA Menards Series West results
| Year | Team | No. | Make | 1 | 2 | 3 | 4 | 5 | 6 | 7 | 8 | 9 | 10 | 11 | 12 | AMSWC | Pts | Ref |
|---|---|---|---|---|---|---|---|---|---|---|---|---|---|---|---|---|---|---|
| 2020 | Legal Limit Motorsports | 80 | Chevy | LVS | MMP; 8 | MMP; 9 | IRW | EVG | DCS | CNS | LVS | AAS | KCR | PHO | | 32nd | 71 | |
| 2021 | Legal Limit Motorsports | 80 | Chevy | PHO | SON; 16 | IRW | CNS | | | | | | | | | 18th | 105 | |
| 2021 | Legal Limit Motorsports | 80 | Toyota | | | | | IRW; 17 | PIR | LVS | AAS; 13 | PHO; 25 | | | | 18th | 105 | |
| 2022 | Legal Limit Motorsports | 80 | Chevy | PHO | IRW | KCR | PIR | SON; 24 | IRW | EVG | PIR | | | | | 46th | 55 | |
| 2022 | Legal Limit Motorsports | 80 | Toyota | | | | | | | | | AAS; 9 | LVS | PHO | | 46th | 55 | |
| 2023 | Legal Limit Motorsports | 80 | Chevy | PHO | IRW | KCR | PIR | SON; 22 | IRW | SHA | EVG | AAS | LVS | MAD | PHO | 65th | 22 | |
| 2024 | Legal Limit Motorsports | 80 | Chevy | PHO | KER | PIR | SON; 21 | IRW | IRW | SHA | TRI | MAD | AAS | KER | PHO | 68th | 24 | |
