= Brody Armtrout =

American racing driver (born 2005)

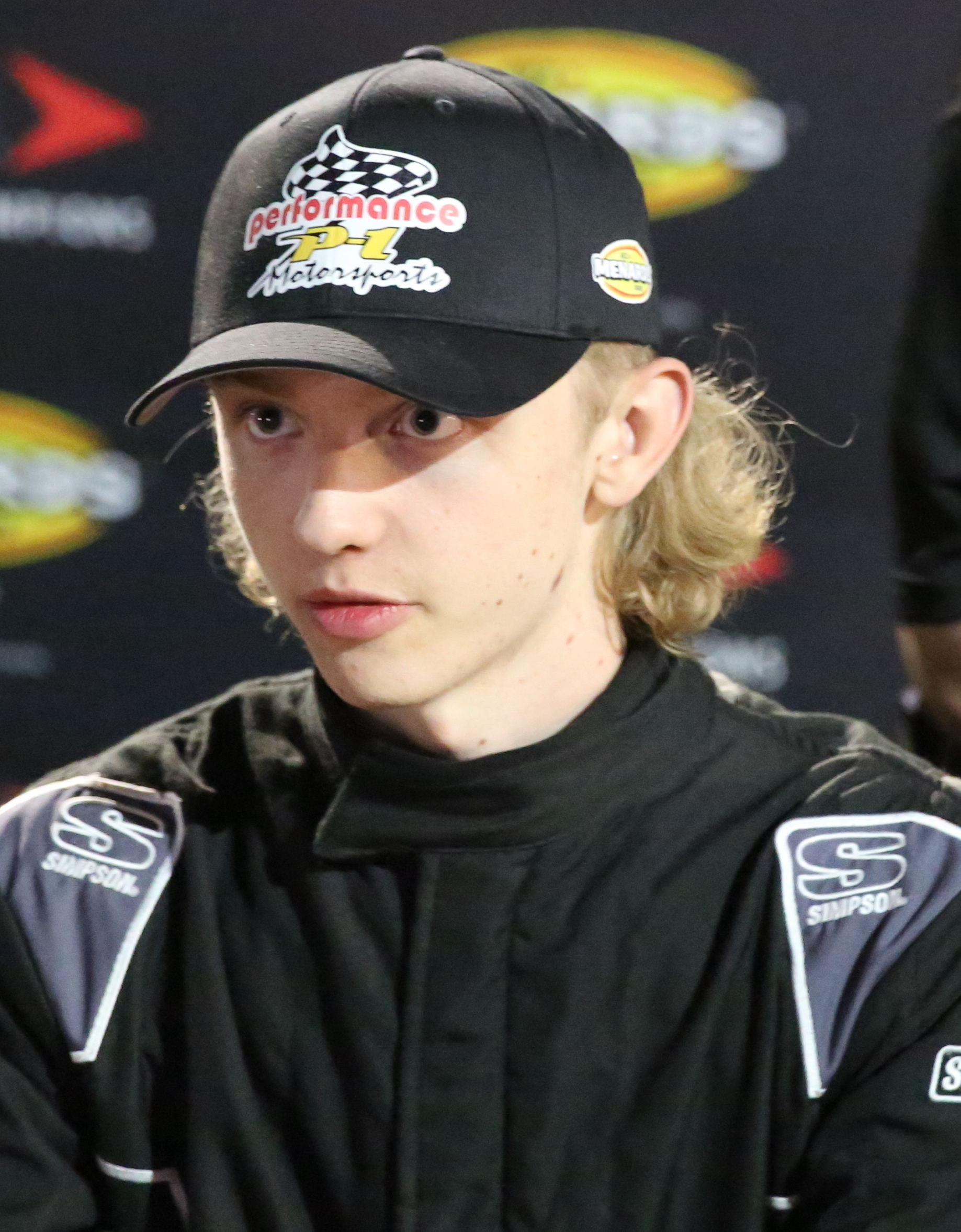
- Armtrout at Madera Speedway in 2023
- Born: September 15, 2005 (age 21); Smartsville, California, U.S.

ARCA Menards Series West career
- 1 race run over 1 year
- Best finish: 61st (2023)
- First race: 2023 ARCA West 150 presented by the West Coast Stock Car Motorsports Hall of Fame (Madera)
Wins	Top tens	Poles
0	0	0
- Statistics up to date as of November 5, 2024.

Brody Armtrout (born September 15, 2005) is an American professional stock car racing driver who last competed part-time in the ARCA Menards Series West, driving the No. 77 Toyota for Performance P–1 Motorsports.

== Racing career ==
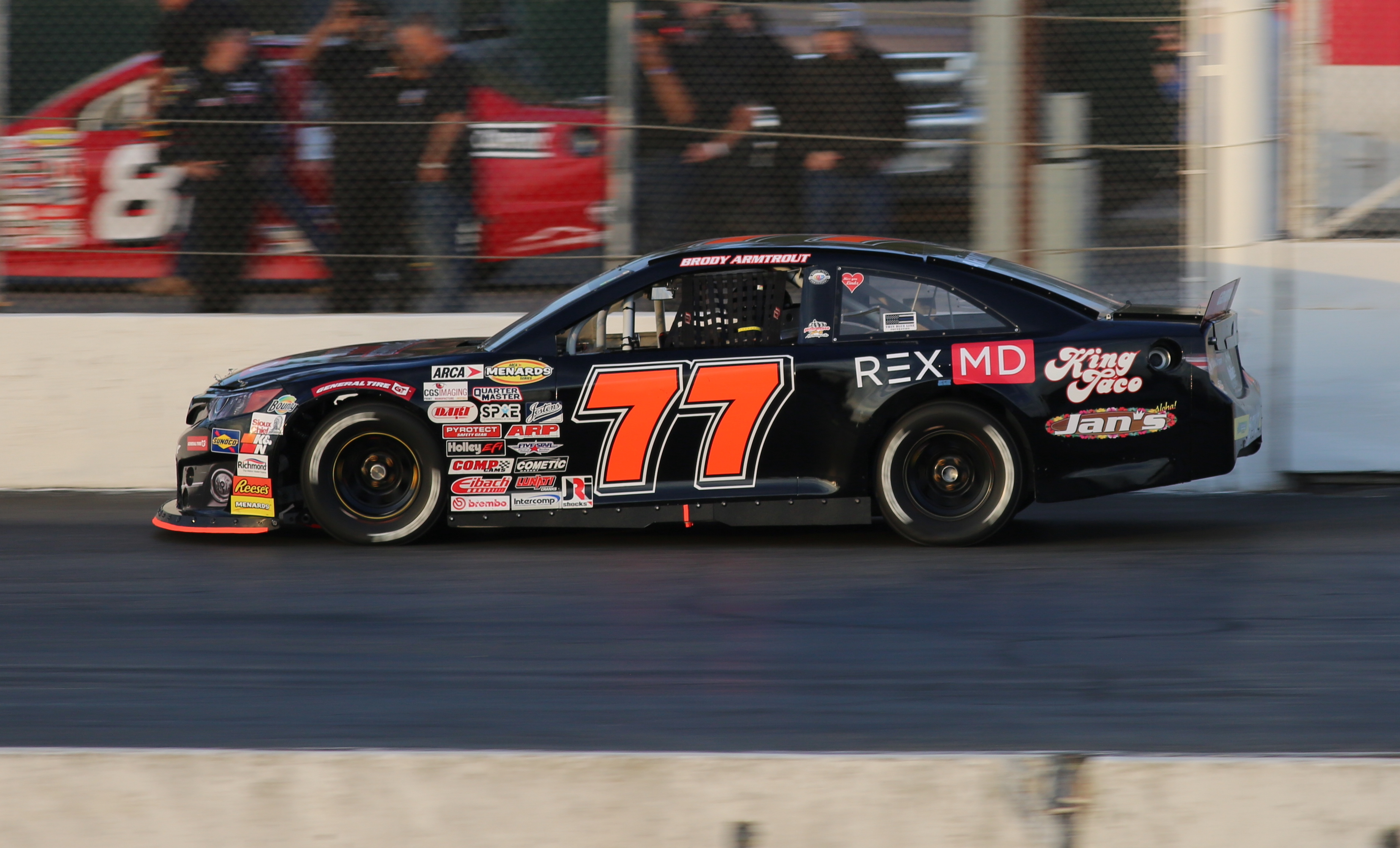
Armtrout's No. 77 ARCA car at Madera Speedway in 2023

Armtrout has previously competed in series such as the SRL SPEARS Pro Late Model Series, the California Speedweek Restricted Division, and the USAC Restricted Micro Sprints National Championship.

In 2023, it was revealed that Armtrout would make his debut in the ARCA Menards Series West at Madera Speedway, driving the No. 77 Toyota for Performance P–1 Motorsports. After placing eighteenth in the lone practice session, he would go on to qualify in eighteenth and finish in nineteenth due to brake issues.

== Motorsports results ==
=== ARCA Menards Series West ===
(key) (Bold – Pole position awarded by qualifying time. Italics – Pole position earned by points standings or practice time. * – Most laps led. ** – All laps led.)

ARCA Menards Series West results
Year	Team	No.	Make	1	2	3	4	5	6	7	8	9	10	11	12	AMSWC	Pts	Ref
2023	Performance P–1 Motorsports	77	Toyota	PHO	IRW	KCR	PIR	SON	IRW	SHA	EVG	AAS	LVS	MAD; 19	PHO	61st	25	
