= Dylan Cappello =

American racing driver and crew chief

- Born: January 17, 1996 (age 30); Peoria, Arizona, U.S.

ARCA Menards Series West career
- 2 races run over 2 years
- Best finish: 37th (2023)
- First race: 2015 Toyota/NAPA Auto Parts 150 (Roseville)
- Last race: 2023 Star Nursery 150 (Las Vegas Bullring)
- First win: 2023 Star Nursery 150 (Las Vegas Bullring)
Wins	Top tens	Poles
1	1	0
- Statistics up to date as of March 6, 2024.

Dylan Cappello (born January 17, 1996) is an American professional stock car racing driver and crew chief who currently serves as the crew chief for Front Row Motorsports and the No. 34 Ford F-150 driven by Layne Riggs.

== Racing career ==
Between 2014 and 2019, Cappello participated in the Lucas Oil Modified Series, where he won 13 races and two championships across six years.

In 2015, Cappello made his debut in the NASCAR K&N Pro Series West at All American Speedway, driving the No. 8 Ford for Bill Hall, where he started in tenth but finished multiple laps down in 21st.

In 2022, Cappello joined Front Row Motorsports as an engineer for its NASCAR Camping World Truck Series team in the No. 38 Ford driven by Zane Smith, who went on to win the championship at Phoenix Raceway. He remained with the team the following year, this time serving as the lead engineer, where they finished seventh in the final points standings. It was also during this year that he returned to the now ARCA Menards Series West at the Las Vegas Motor Speedway Bullring, driving the No. 88 Ford for Naake-Klauer Motorsports. After setting the fastest time in the lone practice session, he qualified in the eighth position, and went on to win the race after Sean Hingorani suffered brake issues whilst leading and surviving two late-race restarts. This was his first career win in two starts in the series.

In 2024, Cappello was announced as the crew chief the No. 38 for Front Row Motorsports in the Truck Series for rookie driver Layne Riggs. At Homestead, NASCAR imposed an L1 penalty on the No. 38, docked the team ten driver and owner points, and suspended Cappello for the Martinsville race after the truck was found to be underweight during pre-race inspection.

In 2025, Front Row Motorsports moved Cappello and Riggs to the No. 34.

== Personal life ==
Cappello attended Liberty High School and graduated from Northern Arizona University.

Cappello is a native of Peoria, Arizona. He currently resides in Charlotte, North Carolina.

== Motorsports results ==
=== ARCA Menards Series West ===
(key) (Bold – Pole position awarded by qualifying time. Italics – Pole position earned by points standings or practice time. * – Most laps led. ** – All laps led.)

ARCA Menards Series West results
Year	Team	No.	Make	1	2	3	4	5	6	7	8	9	10	11	12	13	AMSWC	Pts	Ref
2015	Bill Hall	8	Ford	KCR	IRW	TUS	IOW	SHA	SON	SLS	IOW	EVG	CNS	MER	AAS; 21	PHO	68th	23	
2023	Naake-Klauer Motorsports	88	Ford	PHO	IRW	KCR	PIR	SON	IRW	SHA	EVG	AAS	LVS; 1	MAD	PHO		37th	47	

=== CARS Pro Late Model Tour ===
(key)

CARS Pro Late Model Tour results
Year	Team	No.	Make	1	2	3	4	5	6	7	8	9	10	11	12	13	CPLMTC	Pts	Ref
2023	N/A	11	Ford	SNM	HCY	ACE	NWS; 11	TCM	DIL	CRW	WKS	HCY	TCM	SBO	TCM	CRW	51st	22	
2025	RBK	11	Ford	AAS	CDL	OCS	ACE	NWS; Wth	CRW	HCY; 12	HCY; 27	AND	FLC	SBO	TCM	NWS	43rd	50	
2026	RBK	11	Ford	SNM	NSV	CRW; 19	ACE	NWS; 27	HCY	AND	FLC	TCM	NPS	SBO			40th	38	
