= 2023 ARCA Menards Series West =

70th season of the ARCA Menards Series West

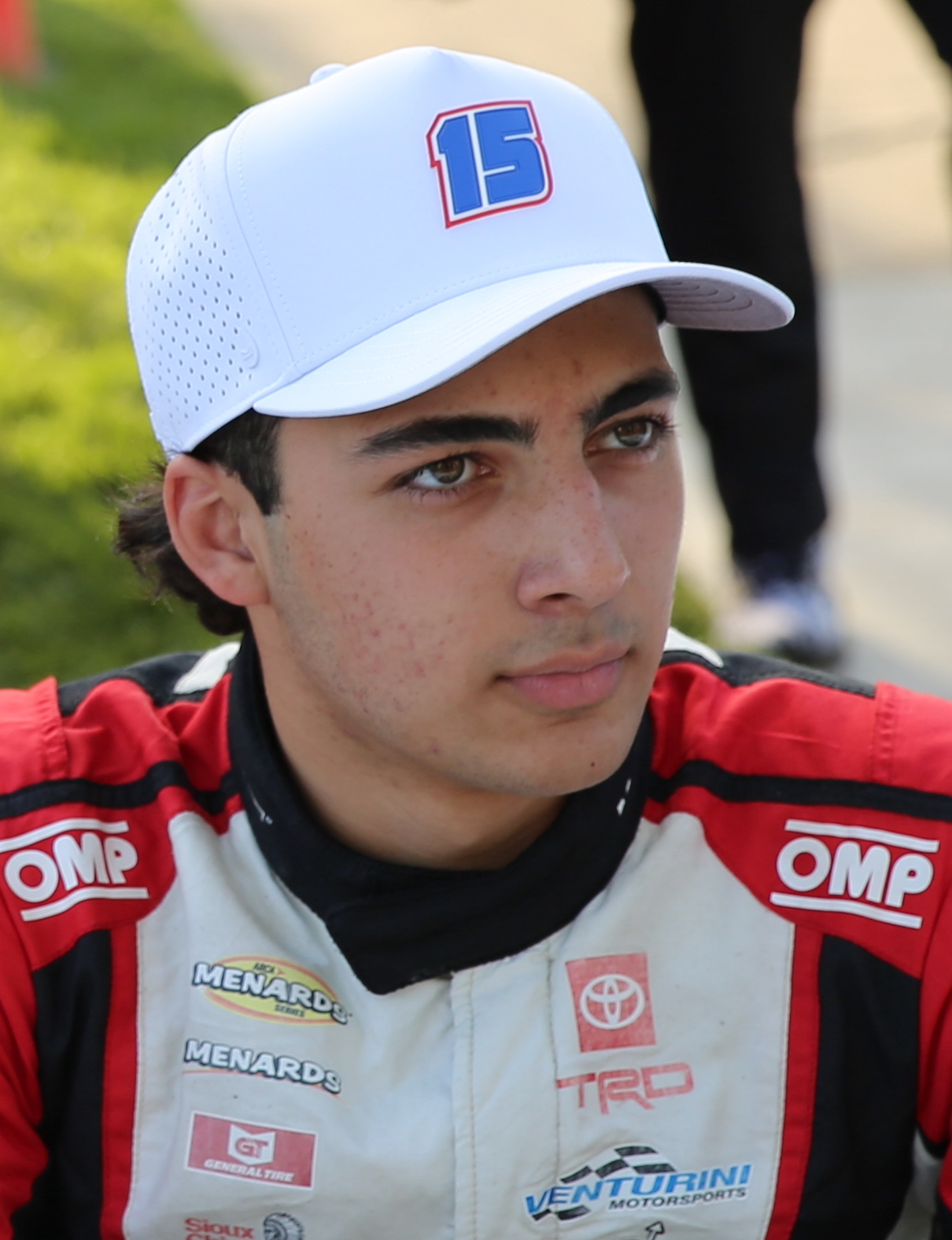
Sean Hingorani, the 2023 ARCA Menards Series West champion.

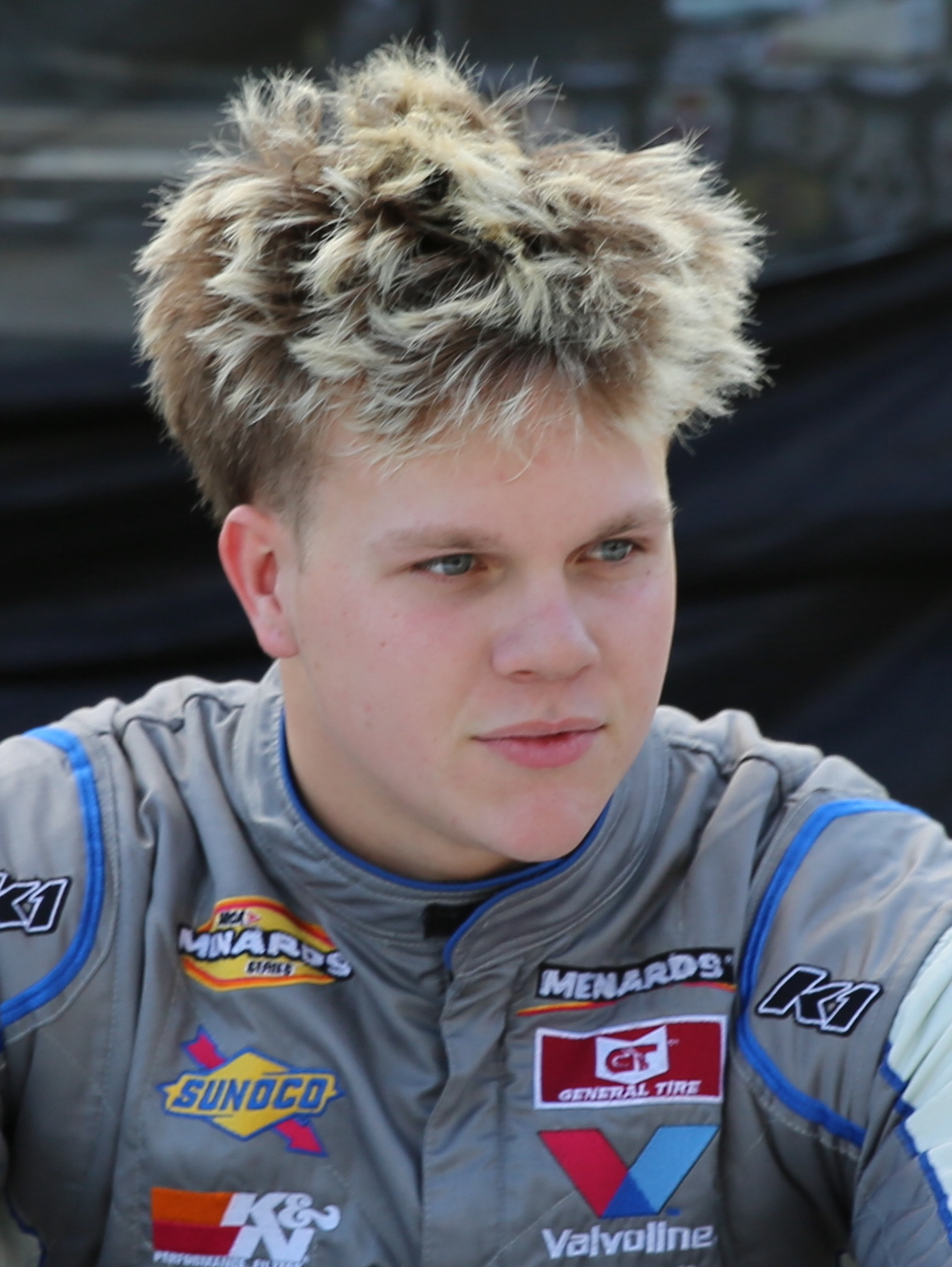
Tyler Reif finished second behind Hingorani in the championship by 36 points.

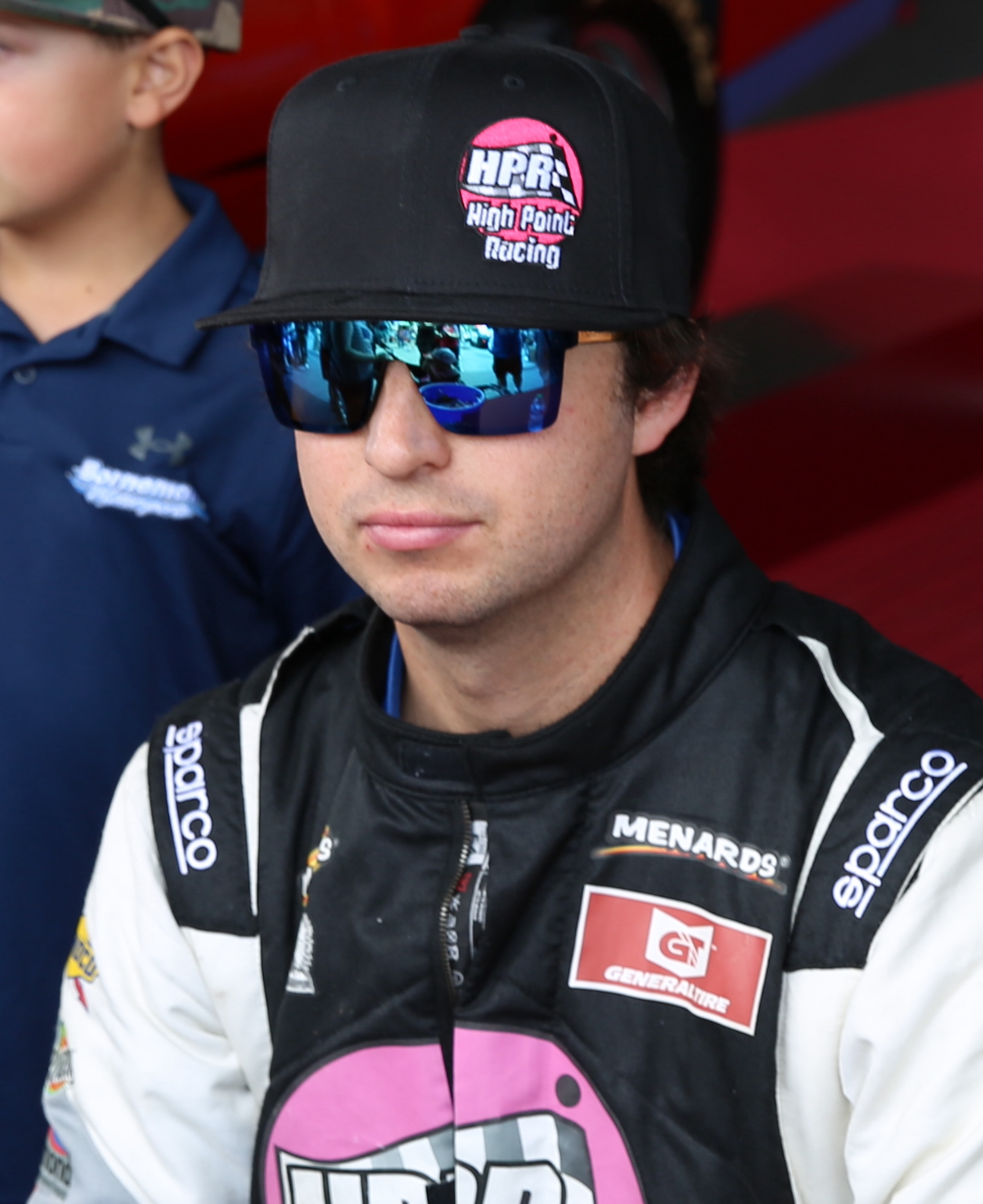
Trevor Huddleston finished third in the championship by 48 points.

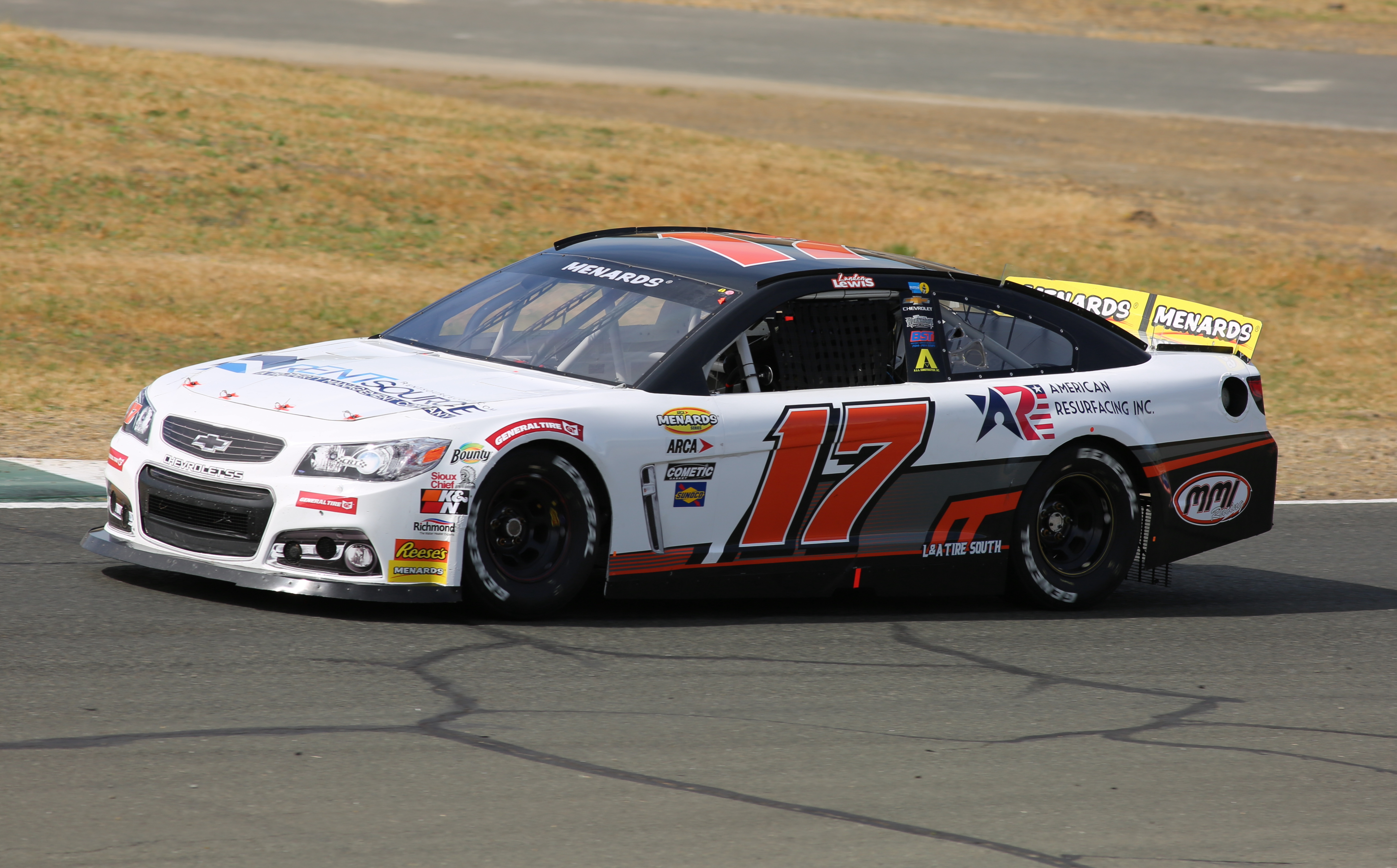
The McGowan Motorsports No. 17 car, driven by Landen Lewis and Kaden Honeycutt, won the owners' championship.

The 2023 ARCA Menards Series West was the 70th season of the ARCA Menards Series West, a regional stock car racing series sanctioned by NASCAR in the United States. The season began on March 10 at Phoenix Raceway with the General Tire 150 and ended with the Desert Diamond Casino West Valley 100, also at Phoenix Raceway, on November 3.

Jake Drew entered the season as the defending champion. He did not return to the West Series full-time in 2023 and defend his title after Sunrise Ford Racing, the team that he drove for in 2022, closed down after the end of the season and he was unable to find a full-time ride with another team at the start of the 2023 season. At the conclusion of the season, Sean Hingorani of Venturini Motorsports clinched the ARCA Menards Series West championship.

== Teams and drivers ==
=== Complete schedule ===
Manufacturer	Team	No.	Driver	Crew chief
Chevrolet	Bill McAnally Racing	16	Tanner Reif	John Camilleri
Ford	High Point Racing	50	Trevor Huddleston	Jeff Schrader
Ford	Naake-Klauer Motorsports	88	Bradley Erickson (R) 8 (Note: Erickson ran the full season split between the Naake-Klauer Motorsports No. 88 car and the Sigma Performance Services No. 23 car.)	Tony Caputo 5 Mike Naake 7
Ford	Naake-Klauer Motorsports	88	Joey Iest 3	Tony Caputo 5 Mike Naake 7
Ford	Naake-Klauer Motorsports	88	Dylan Cappello 1	Tony Caputo 5 Mike Naake 7
Toyota	Shockwave Motorsports (Note: Entries were fielded in a collaboration with Naake-Klauer Motorsports.)	05	David Smith (R)	Brandon Carlson
Toyota	Venturini Motorsports	15	Sean Hingorani (R)	Billy Venturini 1 Kevin Reed Jr. 10; Monon Rahman 1
Toyota	Jerry Pitts Racing	7	Takuma Koga	Denny Moyer 9 Ron Norman 1 Brian Weis 1 Jerry Pitts 1
Toyota 3 Chevrolet 2 Ford 7	Jerry Pitts Racing	70	Kyle Keller	Jerry Pitts 3 Brian Kizer 9
Ford 11 Toyota 1	Central Coast Racing	13	Todd Souza 6 (Note: Todd Souza ran the full season split between the Central Coast Racing Nos. 13 and 3 cars.)	Michael Muñoz
Ford 11 Toyota 1	Central Coast Racing	13	Tyler Reif (R) 6 (Note: Tyler Reif ran the full season split between the Lowden Jackson Motorsports No. 41 car and Central Coast Racing No. 13 car.)	Michael Muñoz
Toyota 3 Chevrolet 9	McGowan Motorsports	17	Landen Lewis 8	Amber Slagle 1 Richard Mason 6 Sean Samuels 5
Toyota 3 Chevrolet 9	McGowan Motorsports	17	Kaden Honeycutt 4	Amber Slagle 1 Richard Mason 6 Sean Samuels 5
Toyota 10 Chevrolet 2	Nascimento Motorsports	04; 21	Ethan Nascimento (R) 9	Mike Nascimento
Toyota 10 Chevrolet 2	Nascimento Motorsports	04; 21	Tim Spurgeon 1	Mike Nascimento
Toyota 10 Chevrolet 2	Nascimento Motorsports	04; 21	Jalen Mack 1	Mike Nascimento
Toyota 10 Chevrolet 2	Nascimento Motorsports	04; 21	Greg Potts 1	Mike Nascimento
Chevrolet 9 Toyota 3	Nascimento Motorsports	4	Eric Nascimento	Ty Joiner

=== Limited schedule ===
Manufacturer	Team	No.	Driver	Crew chief	Rounds
Chevrolet	1/4 Ley Racing	32	Dale Quarterley	Alex Quarterley	2
Chevrolet	66 Rhead Racing	66	Eric Rhead	Will Harris	1
Chevrolet	Bill McAnally Racing	24	Dylan Lupton	Roger Bracken	1
Chevrolet	Bill McAnally Racing	99	Caleb Shrader	Mario Isola	1
Chevrolet	CR7 Motorsports	97	Landen Lewis	Todd Myers	1
Chevrolet	Davey Magras Racing	14	Davey Magras	Zach Magras	2
Chevrolet	Fierce Creature Racing	27	Bobby Hillis Jr.	Bobby Hillis Jr. 1 Ralph Byers 1 Tony Huffman 3 Unknown 1	6
Chevrolet	Last Chance Racing	39	Roxali Kamper	Travis Kamper	1
Chevrolet	Mack Motorsports	83	Jalen Mack	Brian Kennon	2
Chevrolet	Pinnacle Racing Group	28	Jack Wood	Shane Huffman	1
Chevrolet	Rev Racing	2	Andrés Pérez de Lara	Jamie Jones 2 Steve Plattenberger 1	1
Chevrolet	Rev Racing	2	Sebastian Arias	Jamie Jones 2 Steve Plattenberger 1	2
Chevrolet	Rev Racing	6	Jack Wood	Steve Plattenberger	2
Chevrolet	Rev Racing	6	Lavar Scott	Jamie Jones	1
Chevrolet	Spurgeon Motorsports	86	Tim Spurgeon	Mike David	1
Chevrolet	Tamayo Cosentino Racing	45	Tony Cosentino	Caleb Allen	1
Chevrolet	Veer Motorsports (Note: Entry was fielded in a collaboration with Fast Track Racing.)	66	Jon Garrett	Mike Sroufe	1
Chevrolet	Young's Motorsports	02	Leland Honeyman	Andrew Abbott 2 Joshua Graham 2	1
Chevrolet	Young's Motorsports	02	Parker Retzlaff	Andrew Abbott 2 Joshua Graham 2	2
Chevrolet	Young's Motorsports	02	Mamba Smith	Andrew Abbott 2 Joshua Graham 2	1
Ford	3K Motorsports	1	Robbie Kennealy	Thomas Martin 1 Charlie Wilson 4	5
Ford	AM Racing	32	Christian Rose	Ryan London	1
Ford	Borneman Motorsports	8	Johnny Borneman III	Steve Teets	1
Ford	Brad Smith Motorsports	48	Brad Smith	Rand Bitter	1
Ford	Clubb Racing Inc.	03	Alex Clubb	Brian Clubb	1
Ford	Fast Track Racing	10	Tim Monroe	Tim Monroe	1
Ford	Fast Track Racing	11	Bryce Haugeberg	Austin Nemire	1
Ford	Greg Van Alst Motorsports	35	Greg Van Alst	Jim Long	1
Ford	High Point Racing	55	Jake Bollman	Travis Thirkettle	3
Ford	High Point Racing	55	Cole Custer (Note: Entries were fielded in a collaboration with Stewart-Haas Racing.)	Travis Thirkettle	2
Ford	High Point Racing	55	Rodd Kneeland	Travis Thirkettle	1
Ford	Joanides Motorsports	71	Nick Joanides	Dave Jackson	3
Ford	Kart Idaho Racing	38	R. J. Smotherman (R)	Robert Smotherman 1 Mike Holleran 2 Unknown 1	4
Ford	Lowden Jackson Motorsports	41	Tyler Reif (R)	Tony Jackson	6
Ford	Lowden Jackson Motorsports	41	Jake Drew	Tony Jackson	1
Ford	Lowden Jackson Motorsports	41	Jacob Smith	Tony Jackson	1
Ford	Lowden Jackson Motorsports	41	Nick Joanides	Tony Jackson	1
Ford	Lowden Jackson Motorsports	41	Johnny Borneman III	Tony Jackson	1
Ford	Lowden Jackson Motorsports	46	R. J. Smotherman (R)	Dave Jackson	4
Ford	Lowden Jackson Motorsports	46	Kyle Sieg	Dave Jackson	1
Ford	Lowden Jackson Motorsports	46	Stefan Rzesnowiecky	Dave Jackson	1
Ford	Lowden Jackson Motorsports	46	Justin Johnson	Rip Micels	1
Ford	Rette Jones Racing	30	Frankie Muniz	Mark Rette	1
Ford	Ryan Roulette Racing	22	Ryan Roulette	Chris Greaney	2
Ford	Stewart-Haas Racing	9	Ryan Preece	Chad Johnston	1
Toyota	Hattori Racing Enterprises	81	Sammy Smith (Note: Entry was fielded in a collaboration with Joe Gibbs Racing.)	Jon Leonard	1
Toyota	Joe Gibbs Racing	18	William Sawalich	Matt Ross	4
Toyota	Philpott Race Cars	52	Ryan Philpott	Chuck Dozhier 3 Travis Dozhier 1	4
Toyota	Rodd Racing	33	P. J. Pedroncelli	Rodd Kneeland	1
Toyota	Venturini Motorsports	1	Jake Finch	Johnny Allen	1
Toyota	Venturini Motorsports	20	Jesse Love	Shannon Rursch	1
Toyota	Venturini Motorsports	20	Dean Thompson	Shannon Rursch	1
Toyota	Venturini Motorsports	25	Conner Jones	Kevin Reed Jr.	1
Toyota	Venturini Motorsports	25	Toni Breidinger	Cayden Lapcevich	1
Toyota	Venturini Motorsports	55	Toni Breidinger	Cayden Lapcevich	1
Toyota	Venturini Motorsports	55	Kris Wright	Larry Balsitis	1
Toyota	Wayne Peterson Racing	06	A. J. Moyer	Michael Peterson	1
Chevrolet 1 Ford 1	3K Motorsports	49	Monty Tipton	Tommy Hurst	2
Chevrolet 3 Toyota 1	Bill McAnally Racing	19	Eric Johnson Jr.	Chuck Jones	4
Toyota 1 Ford 5	Central Coast Racing	3	Todd Souza	Jason Dickinson	6
Chevrolet 1 Ford 1	Fast Track Racing	12	D. L. Wilson	Dick Doheny	1
Chevrolet 1 Ford 1	Fast Track Racing	12	Ryan Roulette	Jeremy Petty	1
Ford 2 Toyota 5	Jerry Pitts Racing	5	Riley Herbst	Jerry Pitts	2
Ford 2 Toyota 5	Jerry Pitts Racing	5	Kole Raz	Jerry Pitts	2
Ford 2 Toyota 5	Jerry Pitts Racing	5	Buddy Shepherd	Jerry Pitts	1
Ford 2 Toyota 5	Jerry Pitts Racing	5	Dustin Ash	Jerry Pitts	2
Chevrolet 1 Toyota 1	Legal Limit Motorsports	80	Brian Kamisky	Derek Copeland	1
Chevrolet 1 Toyota 1	Legal Limit Motorsports	80	Derek Copeland	Brian Kamisky	1
Toyota 4 Ford 4	Performance P-1 Motorsports	77	Nick Joanides	Dean Kuhn 1 Joe Nava 4 Roger Bracken 2 Unknown 1	6
Toyota 4 Ford 4	Performance P-1 Motorsports	77	Mariah Boudrieau	Dean Kuhn 1 Joe Nava 4 Roger Bracken 2 Unknown 1	1
Toyota 4 Ford 4	Performance P-1 Motorsports	77	Brody Armtrout	Dean Kuhn 1 Joe Nava 4 Roger Bracken 2 Unknown 1	1
Chevrolet 2 Toyota 2	Sigma Performance Services	23	Bradley Erickson (R)	Chris Bray	4

=== Changes ===
==== Teams ====
- On November 4, 2022, Sunrise Ford Racing team owner Bob Bruncati revealed during Jake Drew's championship celebration at Phoenix that he would be closing down his team in the West Series and would focus on competing in local short track racing. In addition to Drew's 2022 championship, SFR won the 2009 championship with Jason Bowles and the 2013 and 2018 championships with Derek Thorn.
- On December 9, 2022, it was announced that the No. 18 car would go back to being owned by Joe Gibbs Racing in 2023. It was owned by Kyle Busch Motorsports in 2022.

==== Drivers ====
- On April 14, 2022, Todd Souza stated in an interview for the ARCA website that he might only run part-time in the West Series in 2023 in a new second car for his own team with someone else replacing him in his No. 13 car full-time. Although Souza did return for another full season in 2023, he and his team did debut a second part-time car, the No. 3, at Shasta with him driving that car and Tyler Reif driving his No. 13 car in that race.
- On March 29, 2023, it was announced that Jake Bollman would make his West Series debut in the race at Irwindale in April in the No. 55 car for High Point Racing and run multiple other races in the car in 2023.
- On September 29, 2023, Young's Motorsports announced that Mamba Smith would drive their No. 02 car in the West Series season-finale at Phoenix. Smith drove the same car in the main ARCA Series race at IRP in 2022. This will be his West Series debut.

== Schedule ==
The full schedule was announced on November 22. Some race dates were announced before then. There are twelve races on the 2023 schedule, up from eleven in 2022.

Note: The race at Phoenix in March was a combination race with the ARCA Menards Series (highlighted in gold).

No	Race title	Track	Location	Date
1	General Tire 150	Phoenix Raceway	Avondale, Arizona	March 10
2	West Coast Stock Car Motorsports Hall of Fame 150	Irwindale Speedway	Irwindale, California	April 1
3	NAPA Auto Parts BlueDEF 150	Kern County Raceway Park	Bakersfield, California	April 22
4	Portland 112	Portland International Raceway	Portland, Oregon	June 2
5	General Tire 200	Sonoma Raceway	Sonoma, California	June 9
6	NAPA Auto Parts BlueDEF 150 presented by the West Coast Stock Car Motorsports Hall of Fame	Irwindale Speedway	Irwindale, California	July 1
7	Shasta 150	Shasta Speedway	Anderson, California	July 29
8	NAPA Auto Parts ARCA 150	Evergreen Speedway	Monroe, Washington	August 19
9	NAPA Auto Parts 150	All American Speedway	Roseville, California	September 30
10	Star Nursery 150	Las Vegas Motor Speedway (Bullring)	Las Vegas, Nevada	October 13
11	51FIFTY Jr. Homecoming ARCA 150 presented by the West Coast Stock Car Motorsports Hall of Fame	Madera Speedway	Madera, California	October 21
12	Desert Diamond Casino West Valley 100	Phoenix Raceway	Avondale, Arizona	November 3

=== Schedule changes ===
- Portland International Raceway only had one West Series race in 2023 after having two in 2022. The race at Portland on Labor Day weekend was removed.
- Shasta Speedway (in northern California) and Madera Speedway (near Fresno, California) were both added to the schedule.

=== Broadcasting ===
Fox again broadcast the combination race at Phoenix in March. FloRacing broadcast the rest of the races.

== Results and standings ==
=== Race results ===
No.	Race	Pole position	Most laps led	Winning driver	Manufacturer	No.	Winning team	Report
1	General Tire 150	William Sawalich	William Sawalich	Tyler Reif	Ford	41	Lowden Jackson Motorsports	Report
2	West Coast Stock Car Motorsports Hall of Fame 150	Trevor Huddleston	Trevor Huddleston	Sean Hingorani	Toyota	15	Venturini Motorsports	Report
3	NAPA Auto Parts BlueDEF 150	Landen Lewis	Landen Lewis	Sean Hingorani	Toyota	15	Venturini Motorsports	Report
4	Portland 112	Landen Lewis	Cole Custer	Landen Lewis	Chevrolet	17	McGowan Motorsports	Report
5	General Tire 200	Ryan Preece	Ryan Preece	Ryan Preece	Ford	9	Stewart-Haas Racing	Report
6	NAPA Auto Parts BlueDEF 150 presented by the West Coast Stock Car Motorsports Hall of Fame	Sean Hingorani	Trevor Huddleston	Trevor Huddleston	Ford	50	High Point Racing	Report
7	Shasta 150	Trevor Huddleston	Trevor Huddleston	Sean Hingorani	Toyota	15	Venturini Motorsports	Report
8	NAPA Auto Parts ARCA 150	Tyler Reif	Sean Hingorani	Sean Hingorani	Toyota	15	Venturini Motorsports	Report
9	NAPA Auto Parts 150	Tyler Reif	Kaden Honeycutt	Kaden Honeycutt	Chevrolet	17	McGowan Motorsports	Report
10	Star Nursery 150	Sean Hingorani	Sean Hingorani	Dylan Cappello	Ford	88	Naake-Klauer Motorsports	Report
11	51FIFTY Jr. Homecoming ARCA 150 presented by the West Coast Stock Car Motorsports Hall of Fame	Eric Nascimento	Kaden Honeycutt	Kaden Honeycutt	Chevrolet	17	McGowan Motorsports	Report
12	Desert Diamond Casino West Valley 100	William Sawalich	William Sawalich	William Sawalich	Toyota	18	Joe Gibbs Racing	Report

=== Drivers' championship ===
Notes:

- The pole winner also receives one bonus point, similar to the previous ARCA points system used until 2019 and unlike NASCAR.
- Additionally, after groups of five races of the season, drivers that compete in all five races receive fifty additional points. These points bonuses will be given after the races at Sonoma and the Las Vegas Bullring.
  - Sean Hingorani, Landen Lewis, Bradley Erickson, Tyler Reif, Trevor Huddleston, Tanner Reif, Kyle Keller, Todd Souza, David Smith, Takuma Koga, Ethan Nascimento, and Eric Nascimento received this points bonus for having competed in the first five races of the season (Phoenix in March, Irwindale in April, Kern County, Portland in June, and Sonoma). Hingorani, Huddleston, Tyler Reif, Souza, Erickson, Tanner Reif, Eric Nascimento, Keller, Koga, and Smith received the fifty bonus points for having competed in the next five races of the season (Irwindale in July, Shasta, Evergreen, Roseville, and The Bullring). Hingorani, Tyler Reif, Huddleston, Erickson, Tanner Reif, Souza, Eric Nascimento, Keller, Koga, Smith, Ethan Nascimento, Nick Joanides, Kaden Honeycutt, Robbie Kennealy and Joey Iest all received this points bonus after competing in the final two races of the year (Madera and Phoenix in November).

(key) Bold – Pole position awarded by time. Italics – Pole position set by final practice results or rainout. * – Most laps led. ** – All laps led.

Pos	Driver	PHO	IRW	KCR	PIR	SON	IRW	SHA	EVG	AAS	LVS	MAD	PHO	Points
1	Sean Hingorani **(R)**	16	1	1	11	6	**12**	1	1*	2	**16***	5	3	626
2	Tyler Reif **(R)**	1	3	6	15	17	6	14	**2**	**13**	4	11	5	590
3	Trevor Huddleston	9	**4***	3	12	28	1*	**2***	6	15	2	10	20	578
4	Bradley Erickson **(R)**	3	8	5	6	7	13	9	9	14	21	4	7	572
5	Tanner Reif	12	5	4	14	20	3	7	15	3	3	17	8	567
6	Todd Souza	11	11	9	22	8	4	10	10	5	7	2	26	553
7	Eric Nascimento	14	14	15	16	23	2	5	5	7	5	**6**	19	548
8	Kyle Keller	5	6	14	20	13	15	6	7	17	6	7	14	548
9	Takuma Koga	19	7	11	8	24	10	11	12	10	19	15	16	516
10	David Smith **(R)**	17	10	13	13	15	11	15	13	12	14	13	23	509
11	Landen Lewis	2	2	**2***	**1**	19	9	4	4				6	409
12	Ethan Nascimento **(R)**	26	13	8	23	10	14		14	Wth		14	13	361
13	Nick Joanides		16	10		14	8	8	Wth	11	17	8	27	327
14	Kaden Honeycutt									1*	9	1**	9	216
15	Robbie Kennealy						5			16	8	16	18	207
16	William Sawalich	**13***			4	5							**1***	162
17	Joey Iest									4		3	25	150
18	R. J. Smotherman **(R)**	29	15	16			Wth			8	10	Wth	Wth	142
19	Bobby Hillis Jr.	25	9	12		Wth					20		28	126
20	Eric Johnson Jr.				10	27			11	9				119
21	Ryan Philpott				19	26		13				9		109
22	Jake Bollman		12	7			7			Wth				106
23	Jack Wood	28				4							4	96
24	Kole Raz							3	3					82
25	Dale Quarterley				3	11								74
26	Cole Custer				2*	18								70
27	Riley Herbst				18	3								68
28	Tim Spurgeon					12		12						64
29	Davey Magras				9	16								63
30	Parker Retzlaff				5	25								58
31	Johnny Borneman III					9							21	58
32	Monty Tipton										18	12		58
33	Sebastian Arias					21							10	57
34	Dustin Ash										13	18		57
35	Toni Breidinger	22											11	55
36	Ryan Preece					**1***								49
37	Dylan Cappello										1			46
38	Sammy Smith					2								42
39	Dean Thompson												2	42
40	Andrés Pérez de Lara	4												40
41	Frankie Muniz	6												38
42	Buddy Shepherd									6				38
43	Conner Jones	7												37
44	Caleb Shrader				7									37
45	Leland Honeyman	8												37
46	Jacob Smith								8					36
47	Greg Van Alst	10												34
48	Eric Rhead										11			33
49	Greg Potts										12			32
50	Justin Johnson												12	32
51	Tony Cosentino	15												29
52	Mariah Boudrieau										15			29
53	Mamba Smith												15	29
54	Jake Drew							16						28
55	Kyle Sieg				17	Wth								27
56	Derek Copeland							17						27
57	Lavar Scott												17	27
58	Alex Clubb	18												26
59	Rodd Kneeland									18				26
60	Jalen Mack		Wth				Wth			19				25
61	Brody Armtrout											19		25
62	Jon Garrett	20												24
63	A. J. Moyer	21												23
64	Dylan Lupton				21									23
65	Brian Kamisky					22								22
66	Kris Wright												22	22
67	Christian Rose	23												21
68	D. L. Wilson	24												20
69	Roxali Kamper				24									20
70	Ryan Roulette	Wth	Wth										24	20
71	Jesse Love	27												18
72	Stefan Rzesnowiecky					29								15
73	Brad Smith	30												14
74	Tim Monroe	31												13
75	Bryce Haugeberg	32												12
	Tim Goulet										Wth			
	P. J. Pedroncelli											Wth		
	Jake Finch												Wth	

== See also ==
- 2023 NASCAR Cup Series
- 2023 NASCAR Xfinity Series
- 2023 NASCAR Craftsman Truck Series
- 2023 ARCA Menards Series
- 2023 ARCA Menards Series East
- 2023 NASCAR Whelen Modified Tour
- 2023 NASCAR Pinty's Series
- 2023 NASCAR Mexico Series
- 2023 NASCAR Whelen Euro Series
- 2023 NASCAR Brasil Sprint Race
- 2023 SMART Modified Tour
