= R. J. Smotherman =

American racing driver (born 2005)

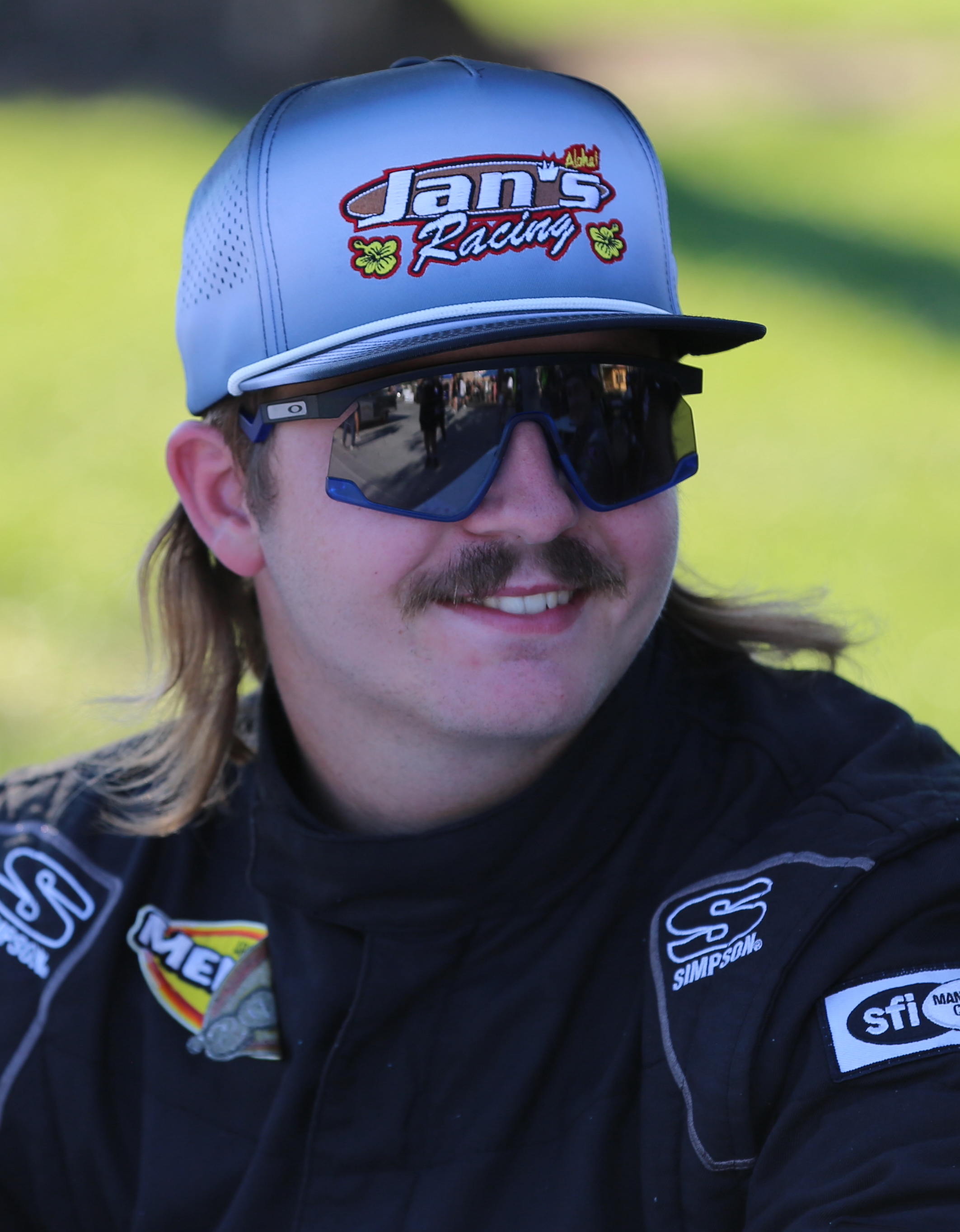
- Smotherman at All American Speedway in 2025
- Born: March 27, 2005 (age 21); Pahrump, Nevada, U.S.

ARCA Menards Series career
- 1 race run over 1 year
- Best finish: 115th (2023)
- First race: 2023 General Tire 150 (Phoenix)
Wins	Top tens	Poles
0	0	0

ARCA Menards Series East career
- 1 race run over 1 year
- Best finish: 35th (2023)
- First race: 2023 Pensacola 200 (Pensacola)
Wins	Top tens	Poles
0	1	0

ARCA Menards Series West career
- 10 races run over 3 years
- Best finish: 18th (2023)
- First race: 2022 NAPA Auto Parts ARCA West 150 (Evergreen)
- Last race: 2025 NAPA Auto Parts 150 (Roseville)
Wins	Top tens	Poles
0	3	0
- Statistics up to date as of November 2, 2025.

R. J. Smotherman (born March 27, 2005) is an American professional stock car racing driver who last competed in the ARCA Menards Series West, driving the No. 9 Ford for Jan's Towing Racing.

== Racing career ==
Smotherman started competing in bandoleros in 2013 at the age of eight. In 2022, Smotherman would make select starts in both the West Coast Sport Compact Series and the Lucas Oil Modified Series.

On August 20, 2022, Smotherman would make his debut in the ARCA Menards Series West at Evergreen Speedway driving the No. 21 Ford for Lowden Motorsports, where he would start 13th and finish 15th due to handling issues. He would then make three more starts with the team later in the year, earning his first top-ten finish at All-American Speedway with a seventh-place finish.

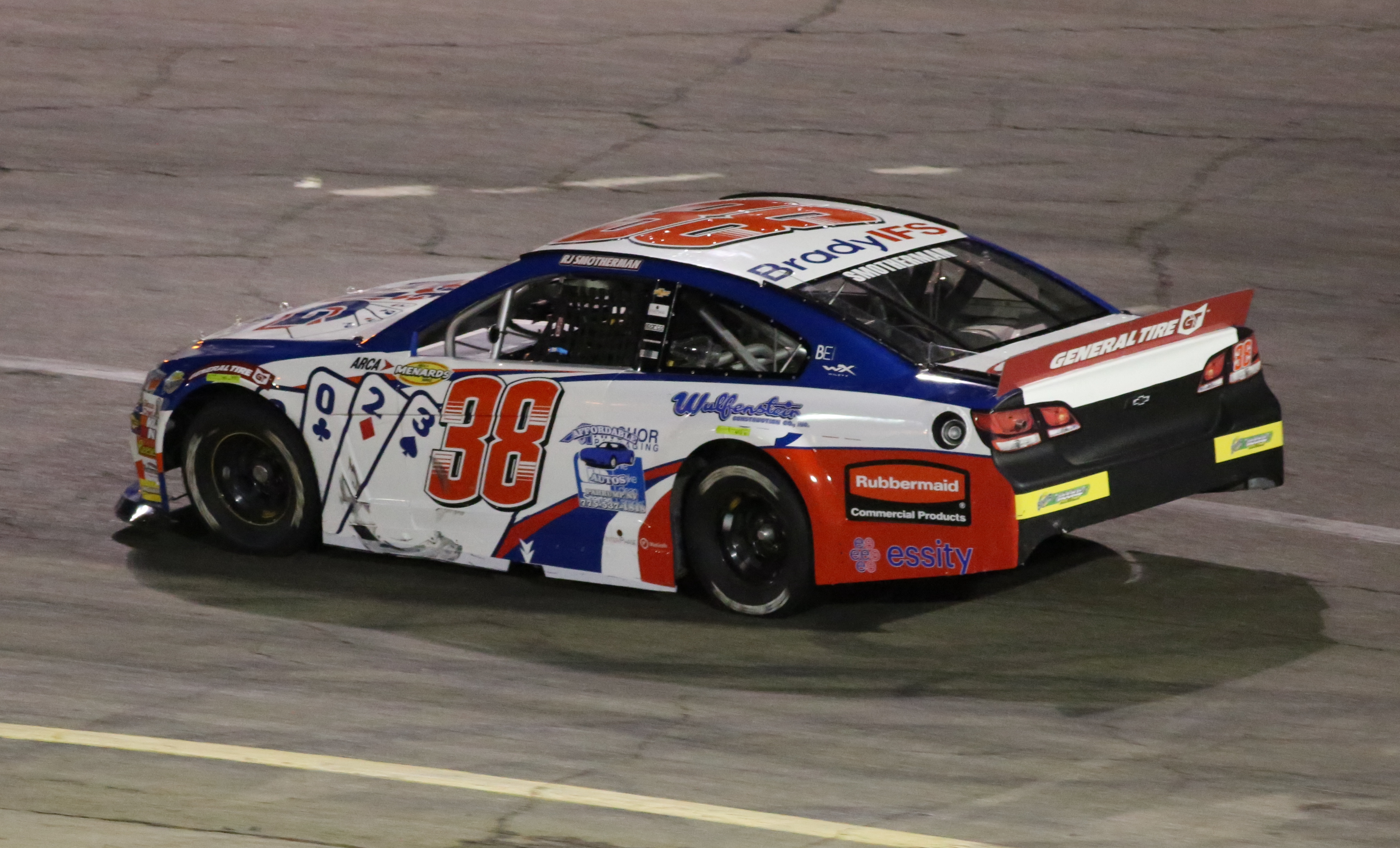
Smotherman's No. 38 car at All American Speedway in 2023

On February 28, 2023, it was announced that Smotherman would run with the renamed Lowden Jackson Motorsports in the No. 46 Ford full-time in the ARCA Menards Series West. He is also announced to run select events in the ARCA Menards Series East. He would also make his debut in the main ARCA Menards Series at Phoenix Raceway in March, as it was a companion event with the West Series. After running the first three races, he would be replaced for the next two rounds at Portland International Raceway and Sonoma Raceway by Kyle Sieg and Stefan Rzesnowiecky respectively. After withdrawing from the second Irwindale Speedway race, he would move over to Kart Idaho Racing in the No. 38 Chevrolet at All American Speedway, where he would finish eighth.

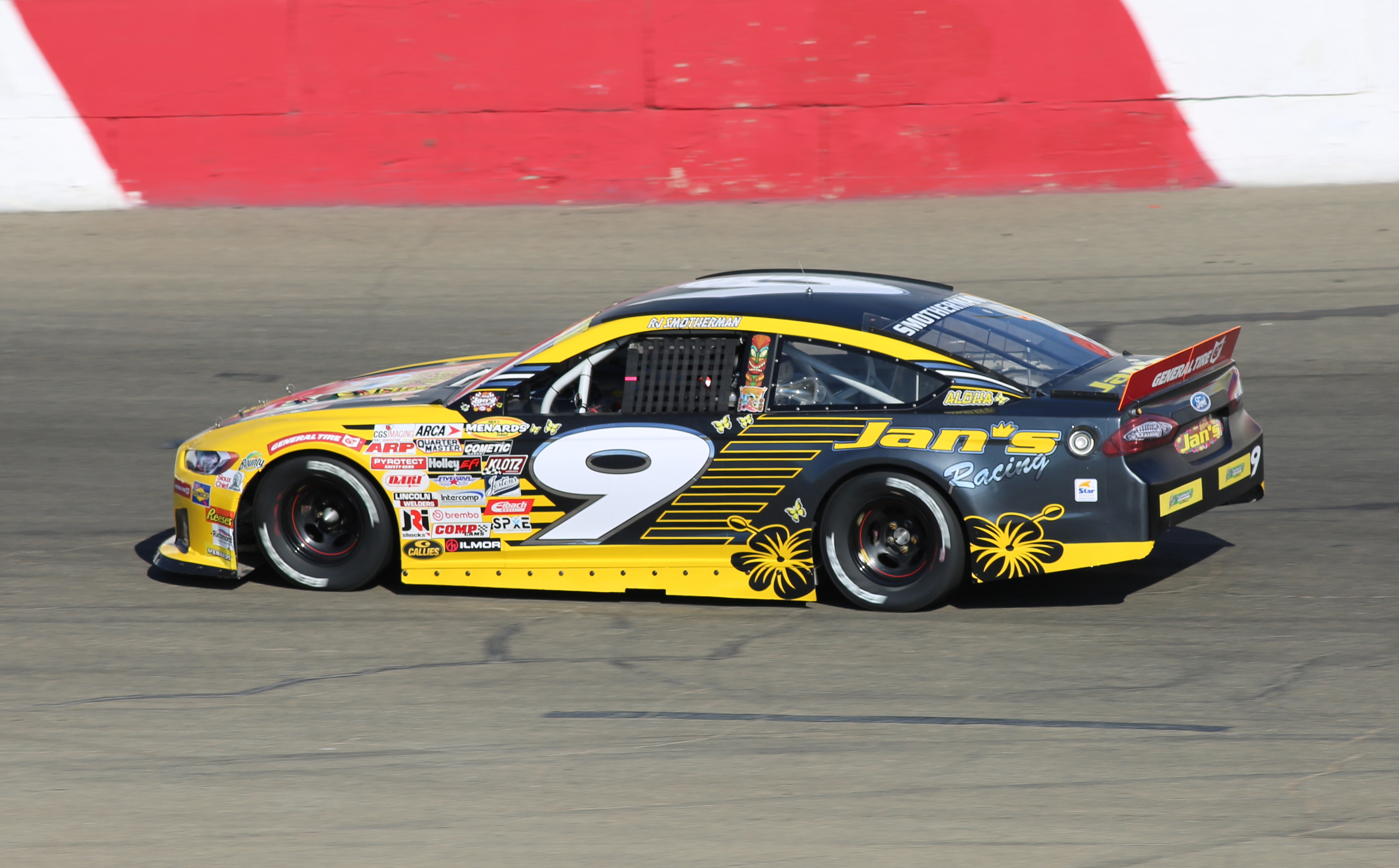
Smotherman's No. 9 car at All American Speedway in 2025

In 2025, Smotherman return to the West Series at All American Speedway, this time driving the No. 9 Ford for Jan's Towing Racing, where he finished in thirteenth.

== Personal life ==
Smotherman is a former student at Pahrump Valley High School and intends on attending college at Great Basin College in Elko, Nevada.

== Motorsports career results ==
=== ARCA Menards Series ===
(key) (Bold – Pole position awarded by qualifying time. Italics – Pole position earned by points standings or practice time. * – Most laps led. ** – All laps led.)

ARCA Menards Series results
Year	Team	No.	Make	1	2	3	4	5	6	7	8	9	10	11	12	13	14	15	16	17	18	19	20	AMSC	Pts	Ref
2023	Lowden Jackson Motorsports	46	Ford	DAY	PHO; 29	TAL	KAN	CLT	BLN	ELK	MOH	IOW	POC	MCH	IRP	GLN	ISF	MLW	DSF	KAN	BRI	SLM	TOL	115th	15	

==== ARCA Menards Series East ====
ARCA Menards Series East results
Year	Team	No.	Make	1	2	3	4	5	6	7	8	AMSEC	Pts	Ref
2023	Lowden Jackson Motorsports	46	Ford	FIF; 9	DOV	NSV	FRS	IOW	IRP	MLW	BRI	35th	35	

==== ARCA Menards Series West ====
ARCA Menards Series West results
Year	Team	No.	Make	1	2	3	4	5	6	7	8	9	10	11	12	AMSWC	Pts	Ref
2022	Lowden Motorsports	21	Ford	PHO	IRW	KCR	PIR	SON	IRW	EVG; 15	PIR					21st	156	
2022	Lowden Motorsports	21	Chevy									AAS; 7	LVS; 22	PHO; 26		21st	156	
2023	Lowden Jackson Motorsports	46	Ford	PHO; 29	IRW; 15	KCR; 16	PIR	SON	IRW; Wth	SHA	EVG					18th	142	
2023	Kart Idaho Racing	38	Chevy									AAS; 8				18th	142	
2023	Kart Idaho Racing	38	Toyota										LVS; 10	MAD; Wth	PHO; Wth	18th	142	
2025	Jan's Towing Racing	9	Ford	KER	PHO	TUC	CNS	KER	SON	TRI	PIR	AAS; 13	MAD	LVS	PHO	60th	31	
