= Sarah Burgess (racing driver) =

Australian racing driver

- Nationality: (Australia) Australian
- Born: 4 October 1980 (age 46) Brisbane, Australia
- Relatives: Bridget Burgess (daughter)

ARCA Menards Series West career
- Debut season: 2022
- Current team: Spurgeon Motorsports
- Car number: 04
- Engine: Toyota
- Crew chief: Mike David

Previous series
- 2015–2019 2014 2011–2013: LOORRS Pro Lite; Global Rallycross; Xtreme Dirt Circuit
- Statistics up to date as of 30 March 2022.

Sarah Burgess (born 4 October 1980) is an Australian professional racing driver and crew chief. She has experience in multiple disciplines such as drifting, rallycross, short course off-road racing, and stock car racing.

== Racing career ==
=== Early career and drifting ===
Burgess' interest in motorsports stemmed from watching Formula One races with her English-born father. She and husband Adam ran an automotive and machining business and fielded drag racing cars in Australia before moving to the United States in 2008; her interest in the auto industry started eight years prior when she visited the country for business and attended the NHRA Winternationals.

The Burgess family started BMI Racing to manufacture parts for clients in addition to competing in drifting. In 2011, Burgess ran two rounds of the Xtreme Drift Circuit in BMI's Mazda RX-8. After Mazda discontinued the car, the team purchased a Ford Mustang in an auction for the 2012 season. By that year, Burgess was the only female driver competing nationally in drifting.

=== Off-road racing ===
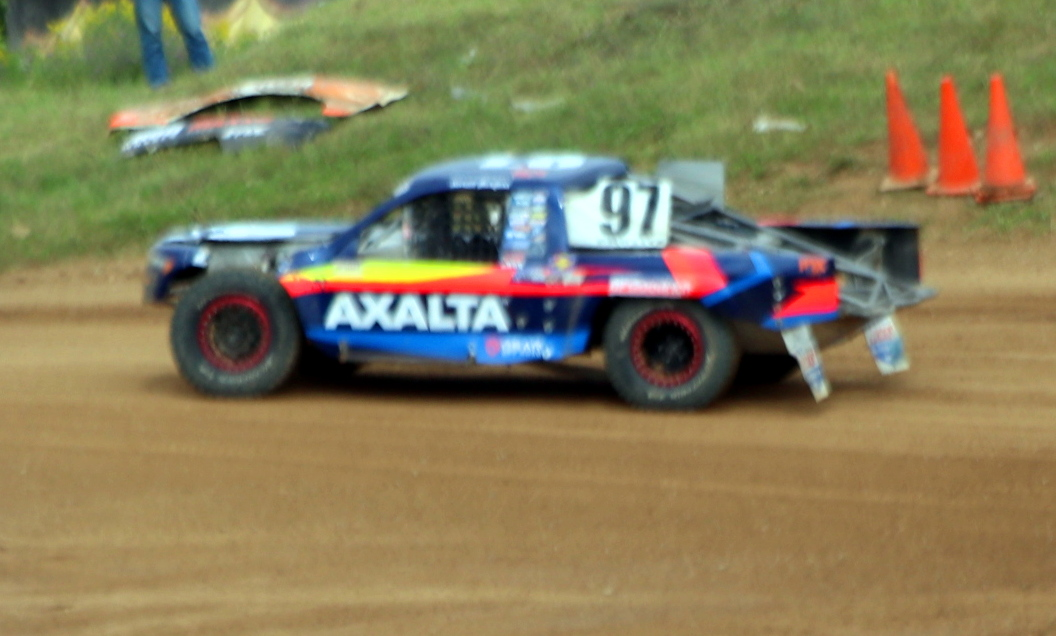
Burgess' 2019 Pro Lite truck at Crandon

In 2014, Burgess entered Global Rallycross in a Chevrolet Sonic for BMI. Royal Purple followed her to rallycross after previously sponsoring her drifting team, while she had factory support from Chevrolet but continued to run BMI as a privateer. The team elected to skip the season opener in Barbados to continue developing the car and scheduled Burgess' debut for X Games Austin. However, a mechanical problem in testing forced her to abandon the attempt. Had the start happened, Burgess would have been the second female driver in GRC history after Emma Gilmour, who debuted earlier that year. She tried again at Daytona International Speedway, where she formed Chevrolet's first multi-car effort alongside Pat Moro, but did not run any of the weekend's races following qualifying.

Dissatisfied with disciplines that she felt were not enticing enough for fans, Burgess moved to the Lucas Oil Off Road Racing Series in 2015. She initially planned to race in the Pro 4 class before settling on Pro Lite as it allowed her to "get in the truck at a reasonable expense and just learn the processes and understand the way things are done." In an October interview with LOORRS, she explained there was little overlap in driving styles between drifting and short course off-road, with "the only relation" being in "initial entry (into a turn). It doesn't carry over into anything else, so (it's been a matter of) learning how a track changes every lap and how different setups on a truck can change it and, of course, making sure the truck just stays running to start with." Burgess ran seven races in her first season.

Burgess acquired sponsorship from Axalta ahead of the 2019 season.

=== ARCA Menards Series West ===
Burgess served as crew chief and owner for her daughter Bridget in the ARCA Menards Series West. With a lack of funding compared to the top teams in the series, Burgess was often been Bridget's only pit crew member; she once changed all four tires on Bridget's car by herself during a pit stop.

Burgess had also expressed interest in joining Bridget in a West Series race as a driver. In March 2022, Burgess obtained her ARCA license after completing some test laps in Bridget's car when the series visited Irwindale Speedway. She nearly made her debut in the following day's NAPA Auto Parts 150 as a replacement driver for Eric Nascimento. Burgess qualified 15th of 16 cars; however, just prior to the green flag, the team withdrew from the event. In April, Burgess revealed she was still searching for sponsorship to allow her to compete in a race when the series returned to Irwindale later in the summer. Burgess eventually picked up sponsorship from eBay Motors for the Las Vegas Motor Speedway Bullring race on 14 October, finishing in seventeenth place with Bridget five spots ahead in twelfth.

== Personal life ==
During her youth, Burgess played sports like BMX racing, kayaking, and speed skating on both ice and inline. In ice speed skating, she represented Australia three times in the World Junior Speed Skating Championships. She met her husband Adam, who ran a bread delivery company in Brisbane, at a business banquet in 1999.

Outside of driving, she has worked for SEMA in the marketing department. Her daughter Bridget drives in the ARCA Menards Series West for BMI Racing.

== Motorsports career results ==
=== Career summary ===
==== Off-road ====
Season	Series	Races	Wins	Podiums	Points	Position	Ref
2015	LOORRS Pro Lite	7	0	0	148	22nd	
2015	LOORRS Regional Pro Lite (SoCal)	4	0	1	147	7th	
2016	LOORRS Pro Lite	13	0	0	284	16th	
2016	LOORRS Regional Pro Lite (SoCal)	1	0	0	44	14th	
2017	LOORRS Pro Lite	13	0	0	408	10th	
2017	LOORRS Regional Pro Lite (SoCal)	5	0	0	191	7th	
2018	LOORRS Pro Lite	11	0	0	267	12th	
2019	LOORRS Pro Lite	9	0	0	276	10th	

=== Complete Global RallyCross Championship results ===
==== Supercar ====
Global RallyCross Championship results
Year	Entrant	Car	1	2	3	4	5	6	7	8	9	10	GRC	Points
2014	BMI Racing	Chevrolet Sonic	BAR	AUS	WDC	NYC	CHA	DAY; DNS	LOS	LOS	SEA	VEG	N/A	0

=== ARCA Menards Series West ===
(key) (Bold – Pole position awarded by qualifying time. Italics – Pole position earned by points standings or practice time. * – Most laps led.)

ARCA Menards Series West results
Year	Team	No.	Make	1	2	3	4	5	6	7	8	9	10	11	AMSWC	Pts	Ref
2022	Spurgeon Motorsports	04	Toyota	PHO	IRW; DNS	KCR	PIR	SON	IRW	EVG	PIR	AAS			47th	55	
2022	BMI Racing	97	Chevy										LVS; 17	PHO	47th	55	
