= Chris Lowden =

American professional stock car racing driver and nightclub owner

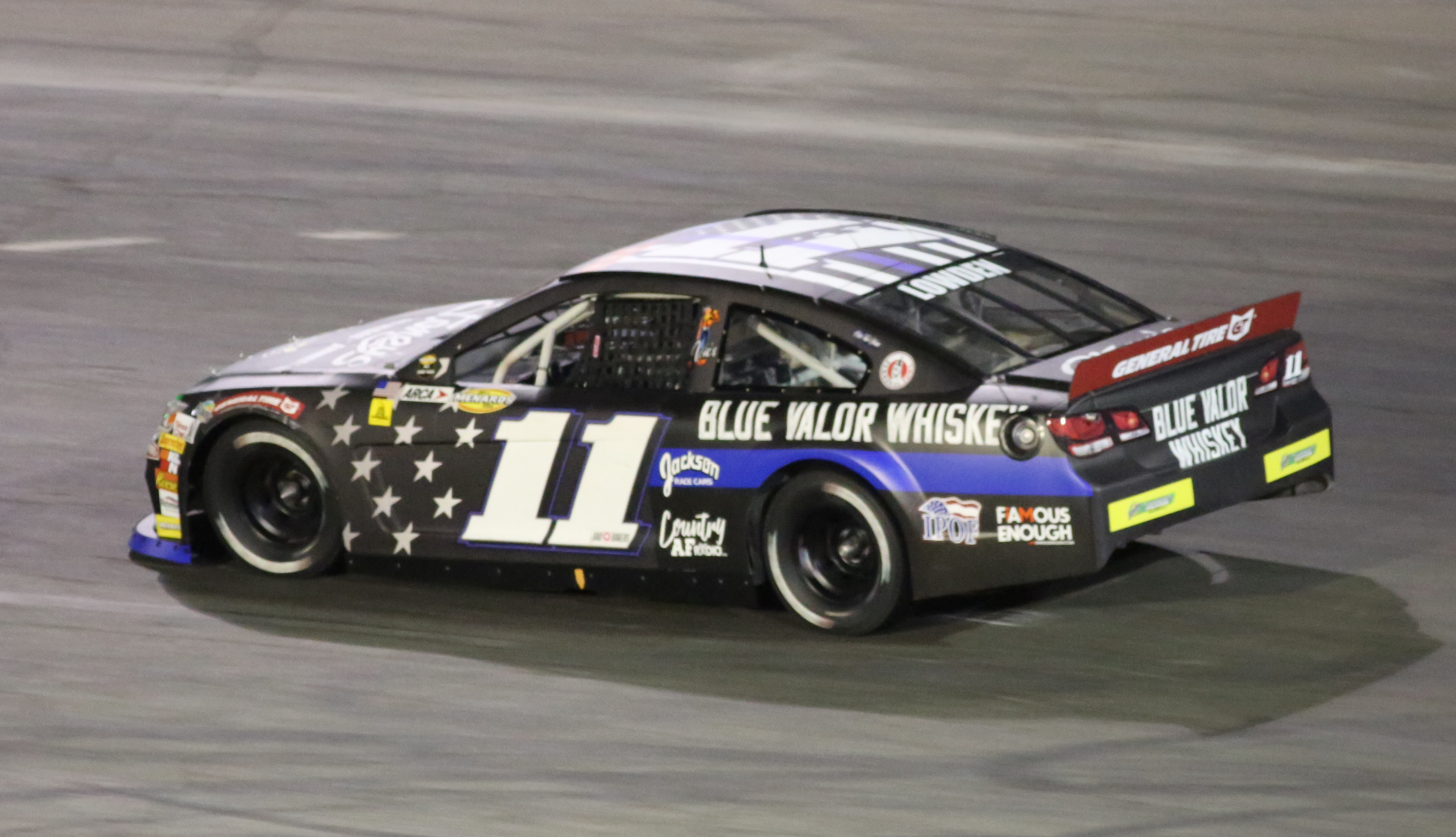
- Lowden's No. 11 ARCA car at All American Speedway in 2022
- Born: March 22, 1965 (age 61); Las Vegas, Nevada, U.S.

ARCA Menards Series career
- 1 race run over 1 year
- Best finish: 120th (2022)
- First race: 2022 General Tire 150 (Phoenix)
Wins	Top tens	Poles
0	0	0

ARCA Menards Series West career
- 8 races run over 2 years
- Best finish: 14th (2022)
- First race: 2020 Star Nursery 150 (Las Vegas Bullring)
- Last race: 2022 NAPA Auto Parts 150 (Irwindale)
Wins	Top tens	Poles
0	0	0
- Statistics up to date as of November 2, 2025.

Chris Lowden (born March 22, 1965) is an American professional stock car racing driver and owner of Las Vegas country music venue Stoney's Rockin' Country. He last competed part-time in the ARCA Menards Series West in 2022, driving the No. 11 Chevrolet SS for his team, Lowden Motorsports.

== Racing career ==
=== ARCA Menards Series West ===
In 2020, Lowden would race in a one-off event for Kart Idaho Racing at the 2020 Star Nursery 150, retiring and finishing 15th due to brake issues.

In 2021, Lowden was scheduled to once again for the team in the 2021 NAPA Auto Care 150, but was replaced by Andrew Tuttle.

In 2022, Lowden would announce that he would race full-time in the ARCA Menards Series West, driving for his own team with assistance from Kart Idaho Racing.

== Stoney's Rockin' Country ==
In 2007, Lowden would open up Stoney's Rockin' Country, after a restaurant Lowden and his friends went to at New Frontier Hotel and Casino shut down due to the closing of the casino. In 2012, the venue would move to Town Square. In 2016, Chris was sued by investors for fraud and racketeering.

In 2018, the nightclub was nominated for Nightclub of the Year by the Academy of Country Music. In May of the same year, the nightclub would open a satellite office in Nashville, Tennessee.

== Personal life ==
Lowden's father, Paul Lowden, is a casino magnate, and his mother, Sue Lowden, was a former state senator.

== Motorsports career results ==
=== ARCA Menards Series ===
(key) (Bold – Pole position awarded by qualifying time. Italics – Pole position earned by points standings or practice time. * – Most laps led.)

ARCA Menards Series results
Year	Team	No.	Make	1	2	3	4	5	6	7	8	9	10	11	12	13	14	15	16	17	18	19	20	AMSC	Pts	Ref
2022	Lowden Motorsports	21	Chevy	DAY	PHO; 31	TAL	KAN	CLT	IOW	BLN	ELK	MOH	POC	IRP	MCH	GLN	ISF	MLW	DSF	KAN	BRI	SLM	TOL	120th	13	

==== ARCA Menards Series West ====
(key) (Bold – Pole position awarded by qualifying time. Italics – Pole position earned by points standings or practice time. * – Most laps led.)

ARCA Menards Series West results
Year	Team	No.	Make	1	2	3	4	5	6	7	8	9	10	11	AMSWC	Pts	Ref
2020	Kart Idaho Racing	11	Chevy	LVS; 15	MMP	MMP	IRW	EVG	DCS	CNS	LVS	AAS	KCR	PHO	38th	29	
2022	Lowden Motorsports	21	Chevy	PHO; 31											14th	216	
2022	Lowden Motorsports	11	Chevy		IRW; 13	KCR	PIR	SON	IRW; 12	EVG; 12	PIR	AAS; 20	LVS; 24	PHO; 30	14th	216	
