= West Series races at Kern =

ARCA Menards Series West races at Kevin Harvick's Kern Raceway

ARCA Menards Series West at Kern
ARCA Menards Series West
- Venue: Kevin Harvick's Kern Raceway
- Location: Bakersfield, California, United States

Circuit information
- Surface: Asphalt
- Length: 0.50 mi (0.80 km)
- Turns: 4

The ARCA Menards Series West has held several races at Kevin Harvick's Kern Raceway in Bakersfield, California over the years. Races at the track have varied from 63 miles to 88 miles. Currently, the track's races are 75 miles in length. The West Coast Stock Car Motorsports Hall of Fame serves as a presenting sponsor of both races.

== First race ==
Oil Workers 150
- Corporate sponsor: Presenting sponsor: West Coast Stock Car Motorsports Hall of Fame
- First race: 2013
- Distance: 75 mi (120.701 km)
- Laps: 150
- Previous names: NAPA Auto Parts 150 (2013, 2015-2017); Bakersfield 175 presented by NAPA Auto Parts (2018); NAPA/ENEOS 150 pres. by West Coast Stock Car HOF (2019); NAPA/ENEOS 125 pres. by West Coast Stock Car HOF (2020); Salute to the Oil Industry NAPA Auto Parts 150 (2022); NAPA Auto Parts BlueDEF 150 (2023); MMI Oil Workers 150 (2024); West Coast Stock Car Motorsports Hall of Fame 150 (2025)
- Most wins (driver): Greg Pursley, Derek Kraus, Todd Gilliland (2)
- Most wins (team): Bill McAnally Racing (5)
- Most wins (manufacturer): Toyota (6)

The Oil Workers 150 is a 75-mile (121 km) annual ARCA Menards Series West race held at Kevin Harvick's Kern Raceway in Bakersfield, California.

=== Past winners ===
| Year | Date | No. | Driver | Team | Manufacturer | Race Distance | | Race Time | Average Speed (mph) | Report | Ref |
| Year | Date | No. | Driver | Team | Manufacturer | Laps | Miles (km) | Race Time | Average Speed (mph) | Report | Ref |
|---|---|---|---|---|---|---|---|---|---|---|---|
| 2013 | October 26 | 26 | Greg Pursley | Gene Price Motorsports | Ford | 150 | 75 (120.701) | 1:10:46 | 63.589 | Report | |
| 2014 | May 24 | 26 | Greg Pursley (2) | Gene Price Motorsports (2) | Ford (2) | 150 | 75 (120.701) | 1:18:13 | 57.532 | Report | |
| 2015 | March 28 | 55 | Dalton Sargeant | Jefferson Pitts Racing | Ford (3) | 160 | 75 (120.701) | 1:18:07 | 61.447 | Report | |
| 2016 | April 2 | 16 | Todd Gilliland | Bill McAnally Racing | Toyota | 150 | 75 (120.701) | 1:16:39 | 56.708 | Report | |
| 2017 | March 23 | 16 | Todd Gilliland (2) | Bill McAnally Racing (2) | Toyota (2) | 156* | 75 (120.701) | 1:09:57 | 66.905 | Report | |
| 2018 | March 15 | 16 | Derek Kraus | Bill McAnally Racing (3) | Toyota (3) | 175 | 87.50 (140.818) | 1:21:04 | 99.124 | Report | |
| 2019 | October 26 | 16 | Derek Kraus (2) | Bill McAnally Racing (4) | Toyota (4) | 155* | 75 (120.701) | 1:04:06 | 72.543 | Report | |
| 2020 | October 25 | 17 | Taylor Gray | DGR-Crosley | Ford (4) | 125 | 62.50 (100.584) | 0:53:47 | 69.724 | Report | |
| 2021 | Not held | | | | | | | | | | |
| 2022 | April 23 | 42 | Landen Lewis | Cook Racing Technologies | Chevrolet | 150 | 75 (120.701) | 0:58:41 | 76.683 | Report | |
| 2023 | April 22 | 15 | Sean Hingorani | Venturini Motorsports | Toyota (5) | 150 | 75 (120.701) | 1:00:02 | 74.958 | Report | |
| 2024 | April 20 | 5 | Kole Raz | Jerry Pitts Racing | Toyota (6) | 150 | 75 (120.701) | 1:04.49 | 69.427 | Report | |
| 2025 | January 25 | 50 | Trevor Huddleston | High Point Racing | Ford (5) | 150 | 75 (120.701) | 0:52:47 | 85.254 | Report | |
| 2026 | February 28 | 19 | Mason Massey | Bill McAnally Racing (5) | Chevrolet (2) | 167* | 83.5 (134.38) | 1:24:4 | 59.162 | Report | |

- 2017, 2019, 2026: Race extended due to a Green–white–checker finish.

== Second race ==
NAPA Auto Parts 150
- Corporate sponsor: NAPA Auto Parts; Presenting sponsor: West Coast Stock Car Motorsports Hall of Fame
- First race: 2013
- Distance: 75 mi (120.701 km)
- Laps: 150
- Previous names: Bakersfield 150 (2014); West Coast Stock Car Hall of Fame 150 (2017); NAPA Auto Parts 175 (2018); NAPA Auto Parts 150 (2024–)
- Most wins (driver): Derek Kraus (2)
- Most wins (team): Bill McAnally Racing (3)
- Most wins (manufacturer): Toyota (4)

The NAPA Auto Parts 150 is a 75-mile (121 km) annual ARCA Menards Series West race held at Kevin Harvick's Kern Raceway in Bakersfield, California.

=== Past winners ===
| Year | Date | No. | Driver | Team | Manufacturer | Race Distance | | Race Time | Average Speed (mph) | Report | Ref |
| Year | Date | No. | Driver | Team | Manufacturer | Laps | Miles (km) | Race Time | Average Speed (mph) | Report | Ref |
|---|---|---|---|---|---|---|---|---|---|---|---|
| 2014 | August 30 | 9 | Dylan Lupton | Sunrise Ford Racing | Ford | 155* | 75 (120.701) | 1:18:56 | 58.91 | Report | |
| 2015 — 2016 | Not held | | | | | | | | | | |
| 2017 | November 4 | 19 | Derek Kraus | Bill McAnally Racing | Toyota | 150 | 75 (120.701) | 1:05:16 | 68.948 | Report | |
| 2018 | October 27 | 16 | Derek Kraus (2) | Bill McAnally Racing (2) | Toyota (2) | 175 | 87.50 (140.818) | 1:20:03 | 65.584 | Report | |
| 2019 — 2023 | Not held | | | | | | | | | | |
| 2024 | October 26 | 15 | Sean Hingorani | Venturini Motorsports | Toyota (3) | 150 | 75 (120.701) | 1:03:06 | 71.315 | Report | |
| 2025 | June 14 | 50 | Trevor Huddleston | High Point Racing | Ford (2) | 150 | 75 (120.701) | 1:05:3 | 68.632 | Report | |
| 2026 | October 31 | 16 | Hailie Deegan | Bill McAnally Racing (3) | Toyota (4) | 42* | 21 (33.8) | | | Report | |

- 2014: Race extended due to a Green–white–checker finish.
- 2026: Race shortened due to rain.

| Previous race: Desert Diamond Casino West Valley 100 (the previous season) | ARCA Menards Series West; Oil Workers 150 | Next race: General Tire 150 (Phoenix) |

| Previous race: Desert Diamond Casino West Valley 100 | ARCA Menards Series West; NAPA Auto Parts 150 | Next race: TBA |
