= Tricon Garage =

American auto race team

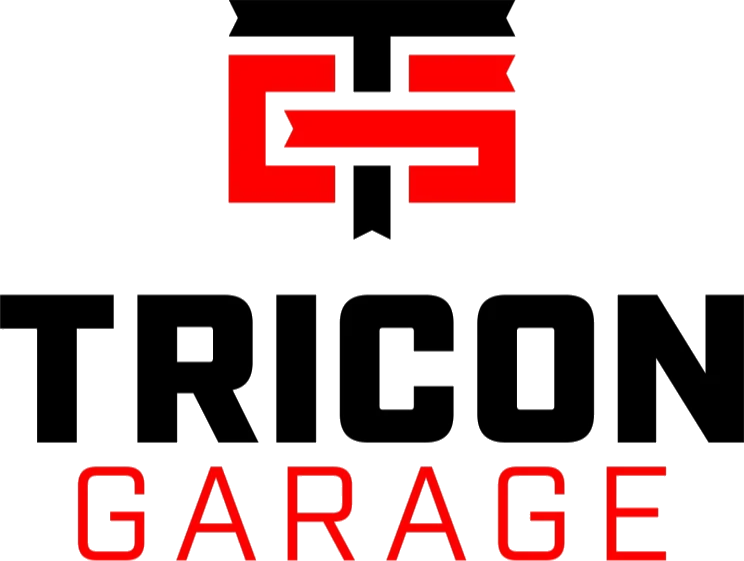
- Owners: David Gilliland; Johnny Gray
- Base: Mooresville, North Carolina
- Series: NASCAR Craftsman Truck Series
- Race drivers: 1.TBA; 5. Dawson Sutton; 11. Kaden Honeycutt; 15. Sammy Smith; 17. Gio Ruggiero
- Manufacturer: Toyota
- Opened: 2018
- Website: tricongarage.com

Career
- Debut: Cup Series: 2025 Daytona 500 (Daytona); Truck Series: 2018 NextEra Energy Resources 250 (Daytona)
- Latest race: Cup Series: 2025 Daytona 500 (Daytona); Truck Series: 2026 Craftsman 200 (Homestead)
- Races competed: Total: 327; Cup Series: 1 Truck Series: 186; ARCA Menards Series: 73; ARCA Menards Series East: 47; ARCA Menards Series West: 20
- Drivers' Championships: Total: 3 Cup Series: 0 Truck Series: 2 ARCA Menards Series: 0 ARCA Menards Series East: 1 ARCA Menards Series West: 0
- Race victories: Total: 53; Cup Series: 0 Truck Series: 34; ARCA Menards Series: 3 ARCA Menards Series East: 10; ARCA Menards Series West: 6
- Pole positions: Total: 38; Cup Series: 0 Truck Series: 23; ARCA Menards Series: 2 ARCA Menards Series East: 9 ARCA Menards Series West: 4

Tricon Garage (stylized as TRICON Garage), formerly known as David Gilliland Racing, DGR-Crosley, and Team DGR, is an American professional stock car racing team that competes in the NASCAR Craftsman Truck Series and the NASCAR Cup Series. The team was founded in early 2017 when racing team owners David Gilliland and Bo LeMastus came together to form a collaborative effort from their respective teams, David Gilliland Racing and Crosley Sports Group, known as DGR-Crosley. DGR-Crosley fielded Toyotas in 2018 and 2019 before announcing its switch to Ford starting in 2020. The team reverted to the David Gilliland Racing name in 2021 as Johnny Gray became a co-owner. Former co-owner and driver Bo LeMastus remained with the team in a marketing and sponsorship capacity.

On October 27, 2022, the team announced that they would be returning to Toyota Racing Development in 2023 and would rename the team Tricon Garage. The new name is said to be derived from the prefix tri- and the word icon.

== Cup Series ==
=== Car No. 56 history ===
On January 16, 2025, it was announced that Tricon would attempt to make its NASCAR Cup Series debut at the 2025 Daytona 500, fielding the No. 56 Toyota Camry driven by Martin Truex Jr., with Bass Pro Shops as the primary sponsor and Cole Pearn serving as the crew chief. The entry would be primarily built by Joe Gibbs Racing as their technical partners.

Truex was able to qualify based on qualifying lap-time into the Daytona 500 field and would start from 39th, needing to rely on time instead of Duel results. On lap 71, Truex was involved in an incident that ended his day and placed 38th.

==== Car No. 56 results ====
Year	Driver	No.	Make	1	2	3	4	5	6	7	8	9	10	11	12	13	14	15	16	17	18	19	20	21	22	23	24	25	26	27	28	29	30	31	32	33	34	35	36	Owners	Pts
2025	Martin Truex Jr.	56	Toyota	DAY; 38	ATL	COA	PHO	LVS	HOM	MAR	DAR	BRI	TAL	TEX	KAN	CLT	NSH	MCH	MXC	POC	ATL	CSC	SON	DOV	IND	IOW	GLN	RCH	DAY	DAR	GTW	BRI	NHA	KAN	ROV	LVS	TAL	MAR	PHO	48th	1

== Craftsman Truck Series ==
=== Truck No. 1 history ===
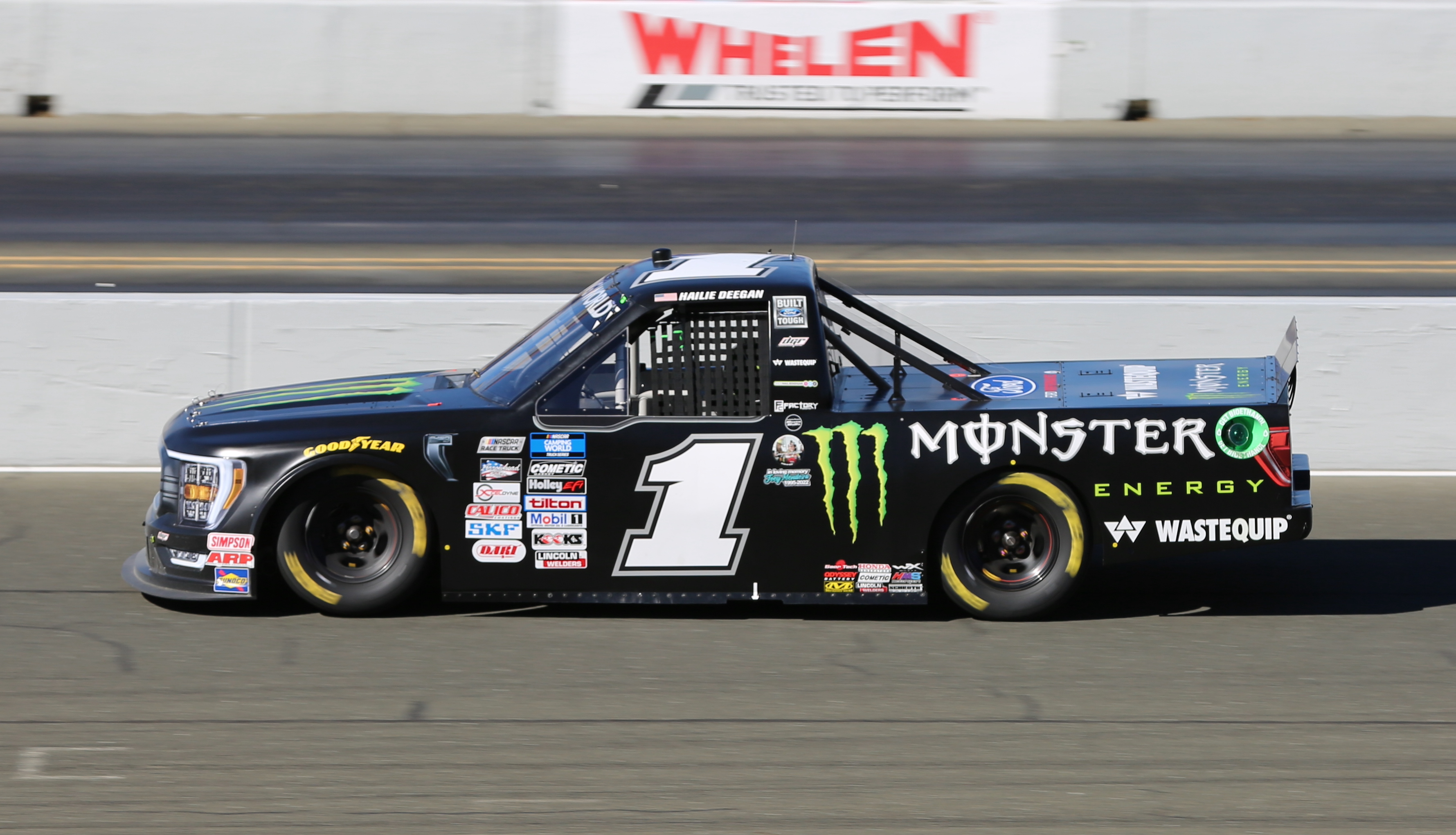
Hailie Deegan in the No. 1 at Sonoma Raceway in 2022

Hailie Deegan (2021–2022)

On January 18, 2021, it was announced that Hailie Deegan would pilot the No. 1 truck in her rookie season. Deegan would return to run a second season in 2022.

Multiple drivers (2023–present)

On October 27, 2022, it was announced that with the move to Toyota in 2023, various Toyota drivers would take the seat.

William Sawalich, who competed in six events for the No. 1 team in 2023, earning three top tens, has been announced for a nine race schedule with the team in 2024. Starkey SoundGear will return to sponsor Sawalich in all nine races in 2024.

Toni Breidinger was announced to drive the 2024 season opening race at Daytona, sponsored by Celsius.

Brett Moffitt, the 2018 Truck Series Champion, was announced to drive the spring Kansas race, sponsored by Concrete Supply and Destiny Homes. He would go on to finish 5th, 2nd best of the 5 Tricon entries that race, behind teammate Corey Heim, who won.

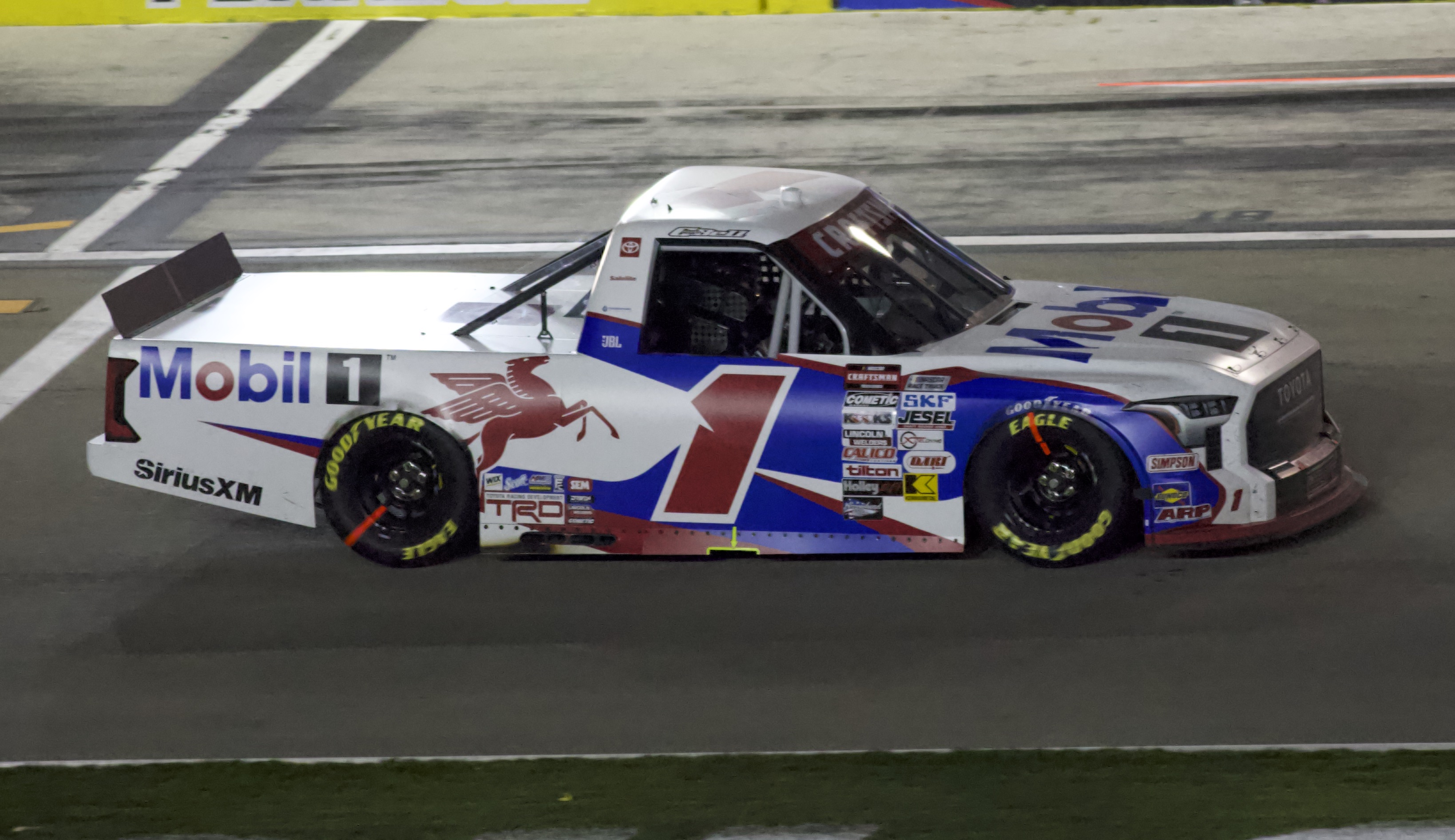
Christopher Bell at Las Vegas Motor Speedway in 2024.

Kris Wright was announced to drive the No. 1 on a two-race deal in 2024.

On January 8, 2026, it was announced that Jimmie Johnson would drive the No. 1 truck at Coronado.

==== Truck No. 1 results ====
Year	Driver	No.	Make	1	2	3	4	5	6	7	8	9	10	11	12	13	14	15	16	17	18	19	20	21	22	23	24	25	Owners	Pts
2021	Hailie Deegan	1	Ford	DAY; 24	DAY; 28	LVS; 29	ATL; 21	BRI; 19	RCH; 17	KAN; 13	DAR; 20	COA; 14	CLT; 13	TEX; 24	NSH; 21	POC; 26	KNX; 21	GLN; 19	GTW; 7	DAR; 29	BRI; 25	LVS; 31	TAL; 24	MAR; 19	PHO; 17				20th	360
2022	Hailie Deegan	1	Ford	DAY; 17	LVS; 33	ATL; 36	COA; 34	MAR; 19	BRI; 18	DAR; 28	KAN; 17	TEX; 17	CLT; 27	GTW; 15	SON; 32	KNX; 15	NSH; 28	MOH; 10	POC; 33	IRP; 13	RCH; 26	KAN; 22	BRI; 14	TAL; 6	HOM; 17	PHO; 31			22nd	349
2023	Jason White	1	Toyota	DAY; 15																									20th	450
2023	Kaz Grala	1	Toyota		LVS; 17		COA; 9	TEX										POC; 31											20th	450
2023	Layne Riggs	1	Toyota			ATL; 28			BRD; Wth																				20th	450
2023	William Sawalich	1	Toyota							MAR; 9							MOH; 27		RCH; 10	IRP; 6	MLW; 26		BRI; 30						20th	450
2023	Toni Breidinger	1	Toyota								KAN; 15				GTW; 24	NSH; 17													20th	450
2023	Bubba Wallace	1	Toyota									DAR; 7	NWS; 5																20th	450
2023	David Gilliland	1	Toyota											CLT; 14										TAL; 35	HOM				20th	450
2023	Jesse Love	1	Toyota																			KAN; 13				PHO; 4			20th	450
2024	Toni Breidinger	1	Toyota	DAY; 27																									19th	483
2024	Colby Howard	1	Toyota		ATL; 17							DAR; 7			GTW; 32														19th	483
2024	Christopher Bell	1	Toyota			LVS; 5																							19th	483
2024	William Sawalich	1	Toyota				BRI; 21		MAR; 26									IRP; 12	RCH; 22	MLW; 14	BRI; 11		TAL; 27	HOM; 17	MAR; 14	PHO; 32			19th	483
2024	Jack Hawksworth	1	Toyota					COA; 6																					19th	483
2024	Kris Wright	1	Toyota							TEX; 30							POC; 26												19th	483
2024	Brett Moffitt	1	Toyota								KAN; 5			CLT; 15															19th	483
2024	Brenden Queen	1	Toyota										NWS; 4			NSH; 19						KAN; 20							19th	483
2025	William Sawalich	1	Toyota	DAY; 9	ATL; 30	LVS; 22									NSH; 24					GLN; 11									17th	575
2025	Brandon Jones	1	Toyota				HOM; 12		BRI; 32	CAR; 17	TEX; 30	KAN; 6		CLT; 10			POC; 4												17th	575
2025	Lawless Alan	1	Toyota					MAR; 10								MCH; 28													17th	575
2025	Brent Crews	1	Toyota										NWS; 22					LRP; 8	IRP; 23		RCH; 16		BRI; 24	GLN; 17	ROV; 2*		MAR; 4	PHO; 28	17th	575
2025	Trevor Bayne	1	Toyota																			DAR; 5							17th	575
2025	Bret Holmes	1	Toyota																							TAL; 28			17th	575
2026	Taylor Gray	1	Toyota	DAY; 28																									8th	2241
2026	Corey Heim	1	Toyota		ATL; 5			ROC; 1*	BRI; 30						MCH; 1											TAL; 10		HOM; 6	8th	2241
2026	Dario Franchitti	1	Toyota			STP; 27																							8th	2241
2026	William Sawalich	1	Toyota				DAR; 10																						8th	2241
2026	Brandon Jones	1	Toyota							TEX; 4		DOV; 6	CLT; 7	NSH; 13															8th	2241
2026	Brent Crews	1	Toyota								GLN; 7													CLT; 20	PHO; 10				8th	2241
2026	Jimmie Johnson	1	Toyota													COR; 30													8th	2241
2026	Thomas Annunziata	1	Toyota														LRP; 29												8th	2241
2026	Nick Leitz	1	Toyota															NWS; 17		RCH; 12		BRI; 34	KAN; 7						8th	2241
2026	Gavan Boschele	1	Toyota																IRP; 8		NHA; 33						MAR; 24		8th	2241

=== Truck No. 5 history ===
Dylan Lupton (2019)

In June 2019, DGR-Crosley formed the No. 5 team for a five-race schedule with Dylan Lupton starting at Chicagoland Speedway. He would go on to attempt four of those races, getting 2 top 10s but failing to qualify into the season finale at Homestead–Miami Speedway.

Dean Thompson (2023–2024)

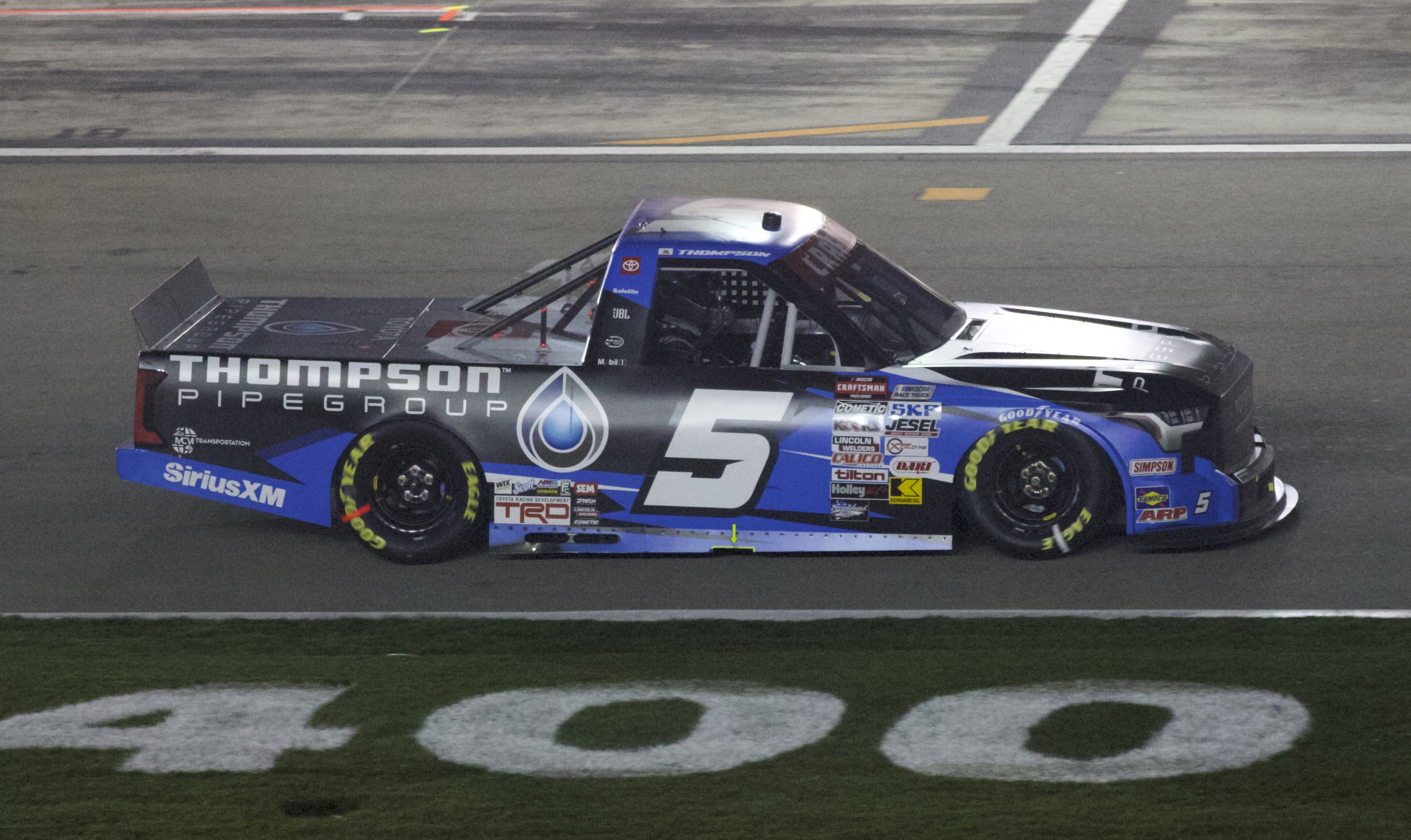
Dean Thompson at Las Vegas Motor Speedway in 2024.

On December 5, 2022, Tricon Garage announced that Dean Thompson would drive for the team in the No. 5 Truck full-time in 2023 and 2024. He finished the 2023 season with two top-fives, five top-tens, a 23rd place points finish.

Toni Breidinger (2025)

On November 26, 2024, Tricon Garage announced that Toni Breidinger would drive for the team in the No. 5 Truck full-time in 2025.

Multiple drivers (2026)

On February 9, 2026, it was announced that Nick Leitz would drive the No. 5 truck at the season opening race for the Truck Series at Daytona International Speedway. On February 12, 2026, it was announced that Adam Andretti would drive select races including Atlanta, St. Petersburg, Rockingham, Watkins Glen and Coronado, driving the No. 5 truck. Corey Heim drove the No. 5 at Darlington, where he won, and North Wilkesboro. Chase Briscoe would drive the No. 5 truck at Bristol. William Sawalich would drive the No. 5 at Texas, Dover, Charlotte and Nashville. Spencer Davis would drive the No. 5 at Michigan. Graham Doyle drove the No. 5 at Lime Rock Park. Harrison Burton will drive the No. 5 at IRP. John Hunter Nemechek would drive the No. 5 at New Hampshire. Bayley Currey is scheduled to drive the truck at Bristol. He would also drive the truck at fall Charlotte race. Brent Crews would drive the No. 5 at Kansas. Thomas Annunziata would drive the No. 5 at Talladega.

Dawson Sutton (2027)

On October 23, 2026, it was announced that Dawson Sutton will drive the No. 5 truck in 2027.

==== Truck No. 5 results ====
Year	Driver	No.	Make	1	2	3	4	5	6	7	8	9	10	11	12	13	14	15	16	17	18	19	20	21	22	23	24	25	Owners	Pts
2019	Dylan Lupton	5	Toyota	DAY	ATL	LVS	MAR	TEX	DOV	KAN	CLT	TEX	IOW	GTW	CHI; 10	KEN	POC	ELD	MCH	BRI	MSP	LVS; 10	TAL	MAR	PHO; 16	HOM; DNQ			38th	77
2023	Dean Thompson	5	Toyota	DAY; 36	LVS; 16	ATL; 30	COA; 35	TEX; 28	BRD; 12	MAR; 21	KAN; 32	DAR; 9	NWS; 35	CLT; 3	GTW; 34	NSH; 33	MOH; 33	POC; 8	RCH; 25	IRP; 32	MLW; 15	KAN; 15	BRI; 35	TAL; 3	HOM; 16	PHO; 7			23rd	370
2024	Dean Thompson	5	Toyota	DAY; 24	ATL; 10	LVS; 30	BRI; 23	COA; 9	MAR; 33	TEX; 16	KAN; 8	DAR; 29	NWS; 27	CLT; 9	GTW; 14	NSH; 28	POC; 9	IRP; 9	RCH; 32	MLW; 19	BRI; 14	KAN; 13	TAL; 32	HOM; 15	MAR; 17	PHO; 15			16th	469
2025	Toni Breidinger	5	Toyota	DAY; 28	ATL; 24	LVS; 21	HOM; 26	MAR; 24	BRI; 25	CAR; 18	TEX; 26	KAN; 20	NWS; 21	CLT; 30	NSH; 30	MCH; 22	POC; 22	LRP; 29	IRP; 26	GLN; 29	RCH; 24	DAR; 24	BRI; 26	NHA; 25	ROV; 30	TAL; 33	MAR; 26	PHO; 25	28th	291
2026	Nick Leitz	5	Toyota	DAY; 11																									14th	624
2026	Adam Andretti	5	Toyota		ATL; 12	STP; 23		ROC; 35			GLN; 25					COR; 14													14th	624
2026	Corey Heim	5	Toyota				DAR; 1											NWS; 9		RCH; 2									14th	624
2026	Chase Briscoe	5	Toyota						BRI; 14																				14th	624
2026	William Sawalich	5	Toyota							TEX; 17		DOV; 17	CLT; 10	NSH; 30											PHO; 6		MAR; 9		14th	624
2026	Spencer Davis	5	Toyota												MCH; 24													HOM; 26	14th	624
2026	Graham Doyle	5	Toyota														LRP; 19												14th	624
2026	Harrison Burton	5	Toyota																IRP; 16										14th	624
2026	John Hunter Nemechek	5	Toyota																		NHA; 19								14th	624
2026	Bayley Currey	5	Toyota																			BRI; 2		CLT; 4					14th	624
2026	Brent Crews	5	Toyota																				KAN; 3						14th	624
2026	Thomas Annunziata	5	Toyota																							TAL; 23			14th	624

=== Truck No. 7 history ===
Tanner Gray (2019)

DGR-Crosley ran the No. 7 truck for Tanner Gray for the last two races of the 2019 season.

Truck No. 7 results

Year	Driver	No.	Make	1	2	3	4	5	6	7	8	9	10	11	12	13	14	15	16	17	18	19	20	21	22	23	Owners	Pts
2019	Tanner Gray	7	Toyota	DAY	ATL	LVS	MAR	TEX	DOV	KAN	CLT	TEX	IOW	GTW	CHI	KEN	POC	ELD	MCH	BRI	MSP	LVS	TAL	MAR	PHO; 17	HOM; 16	47th	42

=== Truck No. 11 history ===
Corey Heim (2023–2025)

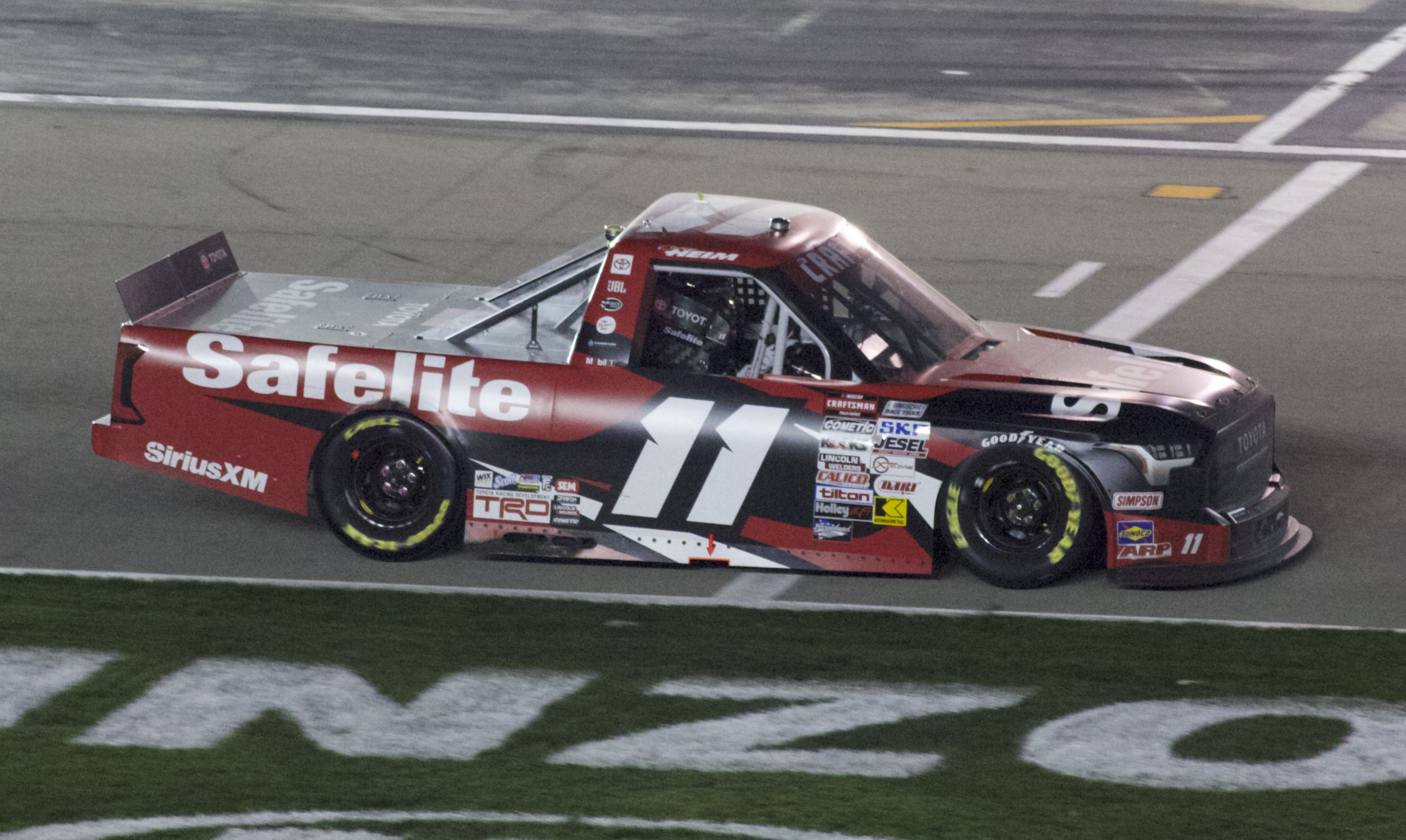
Corey Heim at Las Vegas Motor Speedway in 2024.

Corey Heim was announced as the full-time driver for the new No. 11 entry on October 27, 2022, for the 2023 season with sponsorship coming from Safelite, JBL and SiriusXM. He started the season with an eighth place finish at Daytona. Heim scored his first win of the season at Martinsville. He was forced to miss Gateway due to an illness; Jesse Love substituted for him and finished ninth in the race. Despite missing one race, Heim maintained the points lead and scored his second win at Mid-Ohio. At the conclusion of the Richmond race, Heim claimed the regular season championship. During the playoffs, Heim won at Bristol. Heim finished third at Homestead to make the Championship 4. He finished eighteenth at Phoenix after being spun out by Carson Hocevar and third in the final points standings., However, Heim was penalized 25 driver points for intentionally wrecking Hocevar, resulting in a points finish of fourth.

Heim started the 2024 season with a second-place finish at Daytona. Throughout the regular season, he scored wins at COTA, Kansas, North Wilkesboro, Gateway, and Pocono. During the playoffs, Heim won at Kansas. Heim would finish second in the Championship race at Phoenix, thereby finishing second in the points standings.

Heim started the 2025 season with another second-place finish at Daytona; however, the initial race winner, Parker Kligerman, failed post-race inspection after it was found that his truck was too low. Kligerman was disqualified and Heim was awarded the win. He also scored wins at Las Vegas and Texas. During the playoffs, Heim won at Darlington, New Hampshire, and the Charlotte Roval; the latter earning him a record 10 wins in a season, beating Greg Biffle's previous record of nine wins in 1999. He scored his 11th win of the season at Martinsville to make the Championship 4. Heim concluded the season with a win at Phoenix to claim the Truck Series championship.

Kaden Honeycutt (2026–present)

On December 5, 2025, it was announced that Kaden Honeycutt will drive the No. 11 truck full-time for the 2026 season. He scored his first career Truck Series victory at Watkins Glen. He scored his second win at Richmond. During "The Chase", he won at Kansas and Phoenix. He then won the season ending race at Homestead to win his first Truck Series championship.

==== Truck No. 11 results ====
Year	Driver	No.	Make	1	2	3	4	5	6	7	8	9	10	11	12	13	14	15	16	17	18	19	20	21	22	23	24	25	Owners	Pts
2023	Corey Heim	11	Toyota	DAY; 8	LVS; 4	ATL; 34	COA; 6	TEX; 7	BRD; 15	MAR; 1*	KAN; 2	DAR; 8	NWS; 6	CLT; 2*		NSH; 4*	MOH; 1*	POC; 2*	RCH; 6	IRP; 8	MLW; 4	KAN; 4	BRI; 1	TAL; 5	HOM; 3*	PHO; 18*			3rd	4019
2023	Jesse Love	11	Toyota												GTW; 9														3rd	4019
2024	Corey Heim	11	Toyota	DAY; 2	ATL; 21	LVS; 3	BRI; 6	COA; 1*	MAR; 10	TEX; 2	KAN; 1*	DAR; 28*	NWS; 1*	CLT; 36*	GTW; 1*	NSH; 3	POC; 1*	IRP; 17	RCH; 16	MLW; 7	BRI; 2	KAN; 1*	TAL; 11	HOM; 4*	MAR; 7	PHO; 2			2nd	4035
2025	Corey Heim	11	Toyota	DAY; 1	ATL; 23	LVS; 1*	HOM; 3*	MAR; 6*	BRI; 3	CAR; 8*	TEX; 1*	KAN; 3	NWS; 17*	CLT; 1*	NSH; 2	MCH; 18	POC; 23*	LRP; 1*	IRP; 3	GLN; 1*	RCH; 1	DAR; 1	BRI; 3*	NHA; 1*	ROV; 1	TAL; 2	MAR; 1*	PHO; 1*	1st	4040
2026	Kaden Honeycutt	11	Toyota	DAY; 8	ATL; 21	STP; 5	DAR; 4*	ROC; 2	BRI; 31	TEX; 3	GLN; 1	DOV; 4	CLT; 2	NSH; 27	MCH; 2	COR; 23	LRP; 3	NWS; 11	IRP; 7	RCH; 1*	NHA; 3	BRI; 8	KAN; 1*	CLT; 3*	PHO; 1*	TAL; 3	MAR; 14	HOM; 1	1st	2471

=== Truck No. 15 history ===
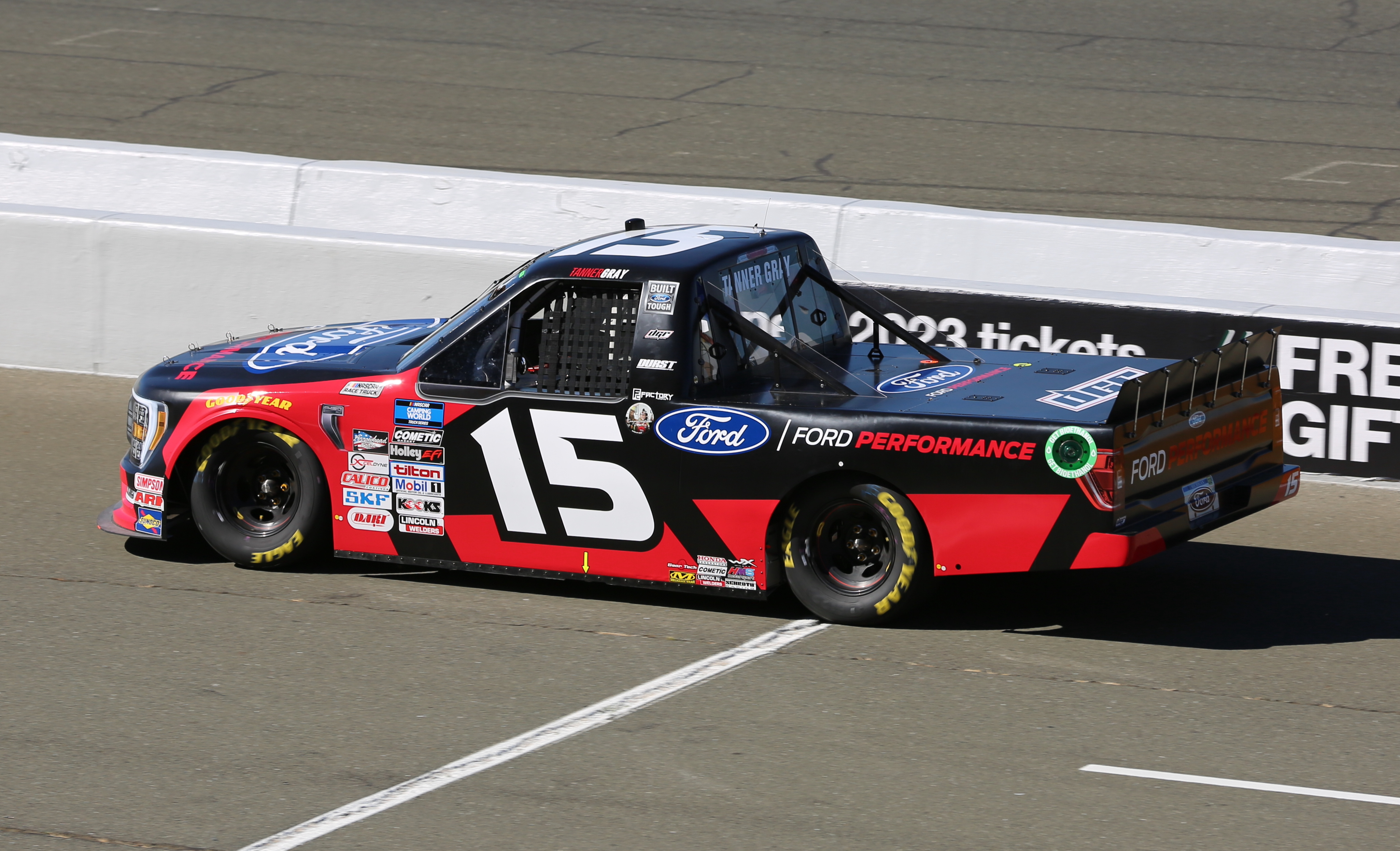
Tanner Gray in the No. 15 at Sonoma Raceway in 2022

Multiple drivers (2019)

DGR-Crosley began running the No. 15 part-time for Anthony Alfredo starting at Las Vegas Motor Speedway in 2019. Alfredo got his first career top 10 in the truck at Charlotte Motor Speedway.

Tanner Gray (2020–2026)

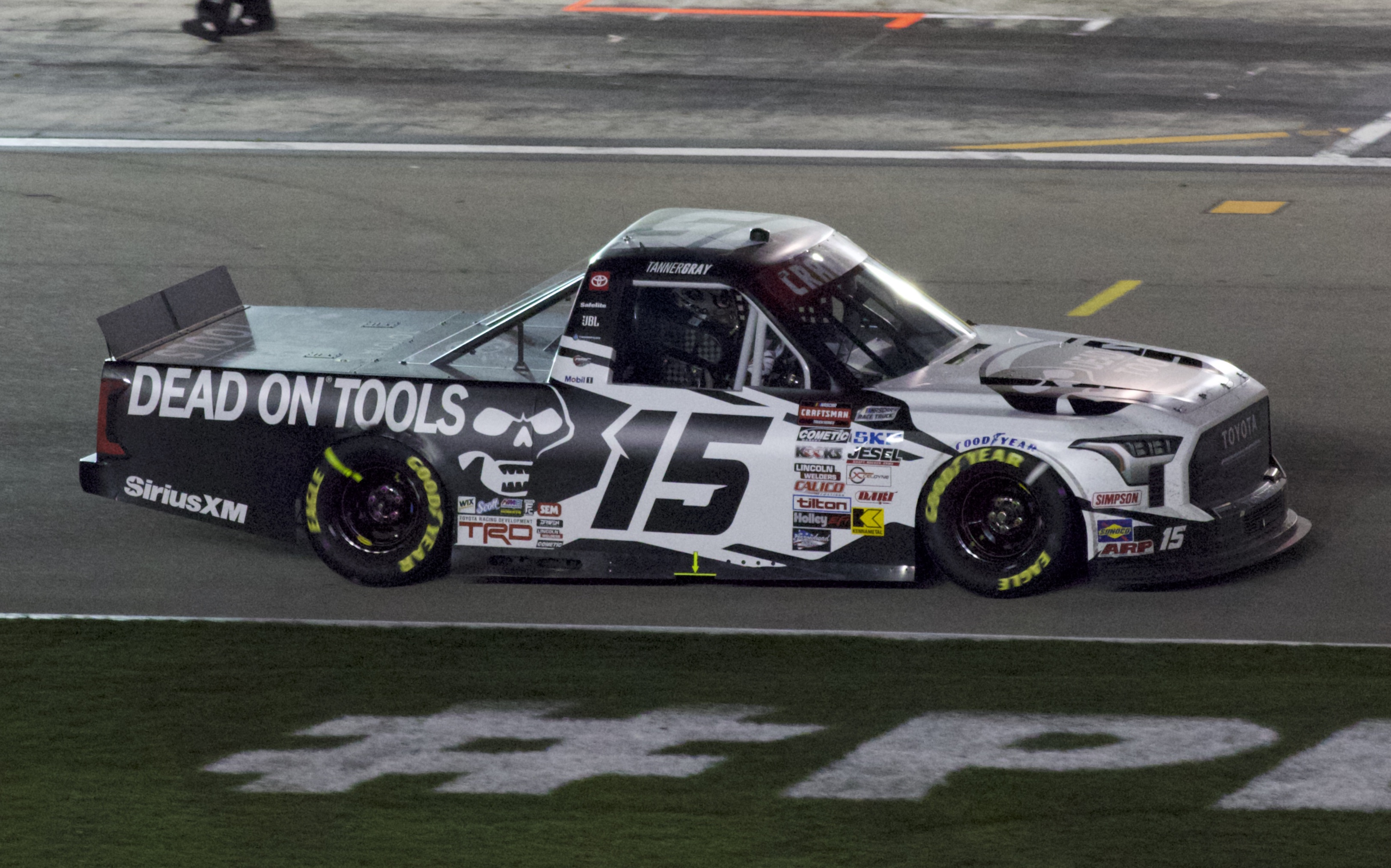
Tan. Gray in the No. 15 at Las Vegas in 2024.

On December 26, 2019, it was announced the No. 15 team would run full-time in 2020 with Tanner Gray behind the wheel. Gray scored four top-five finishes and ended his rookie season seventeenth in points.

Gray returned to the team for 2021. He would have an abysmal season, only earning two top tens.

Gray improved significantly in 2022, which included three consecutive top-ten finishes in the first three races of the season. He earned six top tens and two top fives throughout the season.

Gray started the 2023 season with a career-best 2nd-place finish at Daytona, only behind race winner Zane Smith. He would also score his first career pole at Charlotte Motor Speedway in May, with a lap of 29.936, and a speed of 180.385 mph (290.302 km/h).

In 2024, Gray scored another pole at Charlotte. He earned five top tens throughout the season.

On November 18, 2024, Tricon Garage announced it had renewed Gray's contract for the 2025 season. He earned three top fives and six top tens throughout the season.

In 2026, Gray scored three top tens throughout the season.

Sammy Smith (2027)

On October 23, 2026, it was announced that Sammy Smith will drive the No. 15 truck in 2027.

==== Truck No. 15 results ====
Year	Driver	No.	Make	1	2	3	4	5	6	7	8	9	10	11	12	13	14	15	16	17	18	19	20	21	22	23	24	25	Owners	Pts
2019	Anthony Alfredo	15	Toyota	DAY	ATL	LVS; 18	MAR	TEX	DOV	KAN	CLT; 8	TEX; 12	IOW	GTW	CHI; 9		POC; 31	ELD	MCH; 26			LVS; 12	TAL; 15		PHO; 24	HOM; 32			26th	253
2019	Dylan Lupton	15	Toyota													KEN; 5				BRI; 27	MSP								26th	253
2019	Tanner Gray	15	Toyota																					MAR; 20					26th	253
2020	Tanner Gray	15	Ford	DAY; 23	LVS; 8	CLT; 20	ATL; 11	HOM; 12	POC; 12	KEN; 9	TEX; 36	KAN; 18	KAN; 4	MCH; 3	DAY; 15	DOV; 17	GTW; 10	DAR; 29	RCH; 16	BRI; 3	LVS; 3	TAL; 29	KAN; 36	TEX; 10	MAR; 31	PHO; 15			17th	511
2021	Tanner Gray	15	Ford	DAY; 35	DAY; 20	LVS; 12	ATL; 19	BRI; 13	RCH; 24	KAN; 18	DAR; 33	COA; 31	CLT; 22	TEX; 9	NSH; 18	POC; 16	KNX; 31	GLN; 14	GTW; 19	DAR; 24	BRI; 38	LVS; 23	TAL; 34	MAR; 3	PHO; 35				25th	323
2022	Tanner Gray	15	Ford	DAY; 4	LVS; 5	ATL; 8	COA; 17	MAR; 21	BRI; 15	DAR; 33	KAN; 18	TEX; 24	CLT; 6	GTW; 30	SON; 13	KNX; 22	NSH; 30	MOH; 20	POC; 10	IRP; 23	RCH; 16	KAN; 16	BRI; 17	TAL; 31	HOM; 25	PHO; 8			16th	487
2023	Tanner Gray	15	Toyota	DAY; 2	LVS; 13	ATL; 24	COA; 8	TEX; 27	BRD; 8	MAR; 5	KAN; 18	DAR; 3	NWS; 18	CLT; 27	GTW; 21	NSH; 11	MOH; 20	POC; 36	RCH; 16	IRP; 15	MLW; 11	KAN; 26	BRI; 29	TAL; 25	HOM; 11	PHO; 9			16th	533
2024	Tanner Gray	15	Toyota	DAY; 16	ATL; 19	LVS; 20	BRI; 15	COA; 10	MAR; 16	TEX; 8	KAN; 7	DAR; 10	NWS; 16	CLT; 17	GTW; 11	NSH; 14	POC; 19	IRP; 20	RCH; 12	MLW; 11	BRI; 23	KAN; 6	TAL; 30	HOM; 20	MAR; 29	PHO; 11			15th	550
2025	Tanner Gray	15	Toyota	DAY; 22	ATL; 15	LVS; 3	HOM; 17	MAR; 21	BRI; 18	CAR; 28	TEX; 5	KAN; 27	NWS; 11	CLT; 26	NSH; 16	MCH; 17	POC; 2	LRP; 14	IRP; 13	GLN; 28	RCH; 14	DAR; 6	BRI; 6	NHA; 29	ROV; 31	TAL; 12	MAR; 8	PHO; 21	16th	599
2026	Tanner Gray	15	Toyota	DAY; 23	ATL; 30	STP; 20	DAR; 13	ROC; 16	BRI; 20	TEX; 28	GLN; 30	DOV; 16	CLT; 8	NSH; 33	MCH; 18	COR; 12	LRP; 8	NWS; 18	IRP; 22	RCH; 13	NHA; 21	BRI; 16	KAN; 8	CLT; 19	PHO; 28	TAL; 11	MAR; 18	HOM; 27	20th	510

=== Truck No. 17 history ===
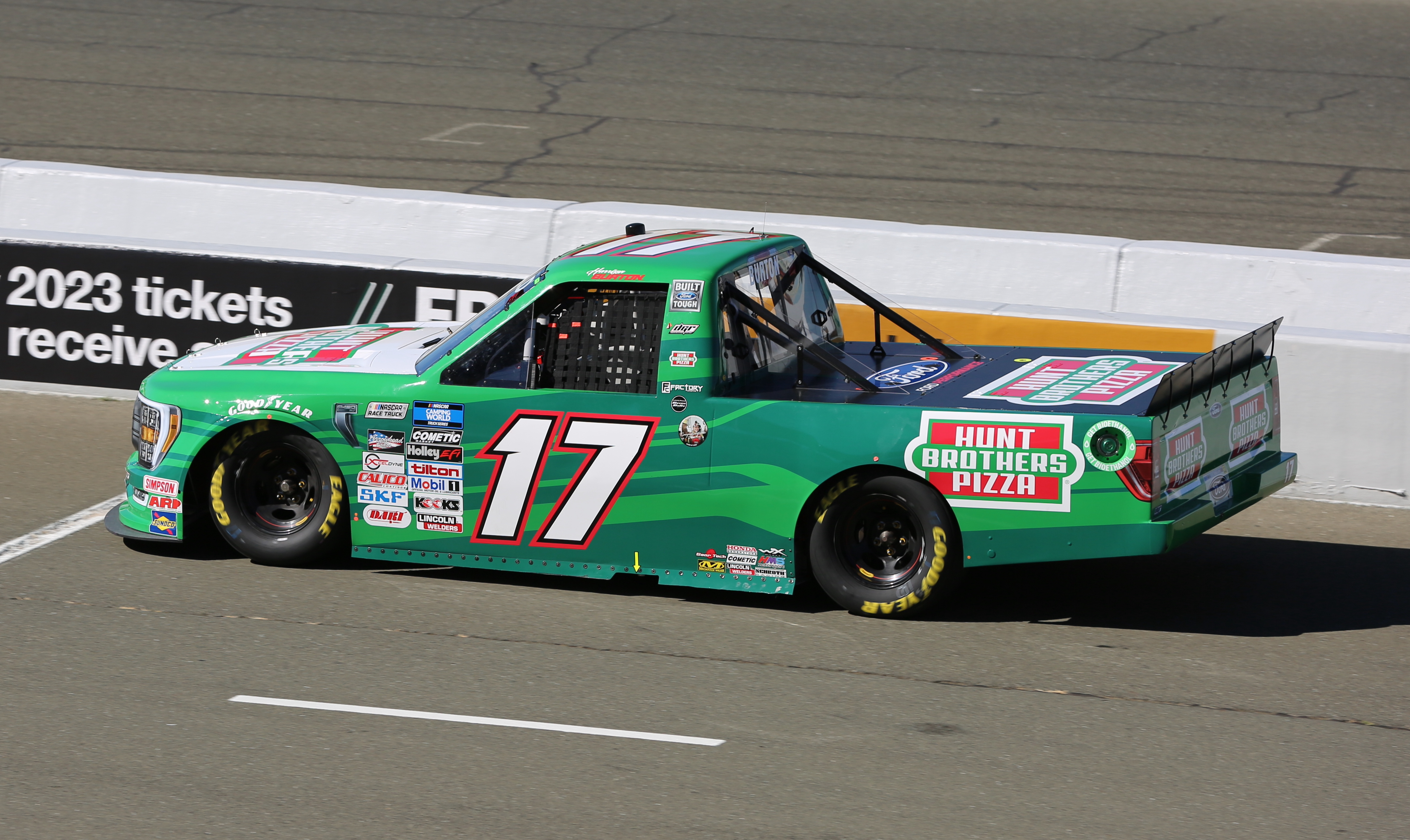
Harrison Burton in the No. 17 at Sonoma Raceway in 2022

Multiple drivers (2018–2022)

On January 22, 2018, it was announced that David Gilliland Racing and Crosley Sports Group would merge into one team and join the Truck Series part-time. The team had purchased Red Horse Racing's assets. Chris Eggleston was announced as the driver beginning at Charlotte for a limited schedule. However, with the threat of rain before the Charlotte race, Eggleston moved to the primary 54 truck for the race and team co-owner Bo LeMastus shifted to the 17, which had no owner points. Qualifying was rained out, and LeMastus missed the race.

On December 14, 2018, it was announced that Tyler Ankrum would compete full-time in the No. 17 competing for Rookie of the Year honors in 2019. He will miss the first three races due to age restrictions but run all the races after that. On February 20, 2019, it was announced that Ryan Reed will drive the No. 17 Toyota at the Strat 200 at Las Vegas. On July 11, 2019, Ankrum scored his first Truck Series win at Kentucky after Brett Moffitt ran out of fuel towards the final lap. This also marked DGR-Crosley's first Truck Series win. In 2020, Hailie Deegan made her Truck series debut at Kansas Speedway. In 2021, Taylor Gray was scheduled to drive at the ToyotaCare 250, but he suffered multiple fractures in a single-car accident. That same year Donny Schatz would make his debut at the Corn Belt Weekend. Ryan Preece won at Nashville Superspeedway in his Truck Series debut. Preece would win again at Nashville in 2022.

Taylor Gray (2023–2024)

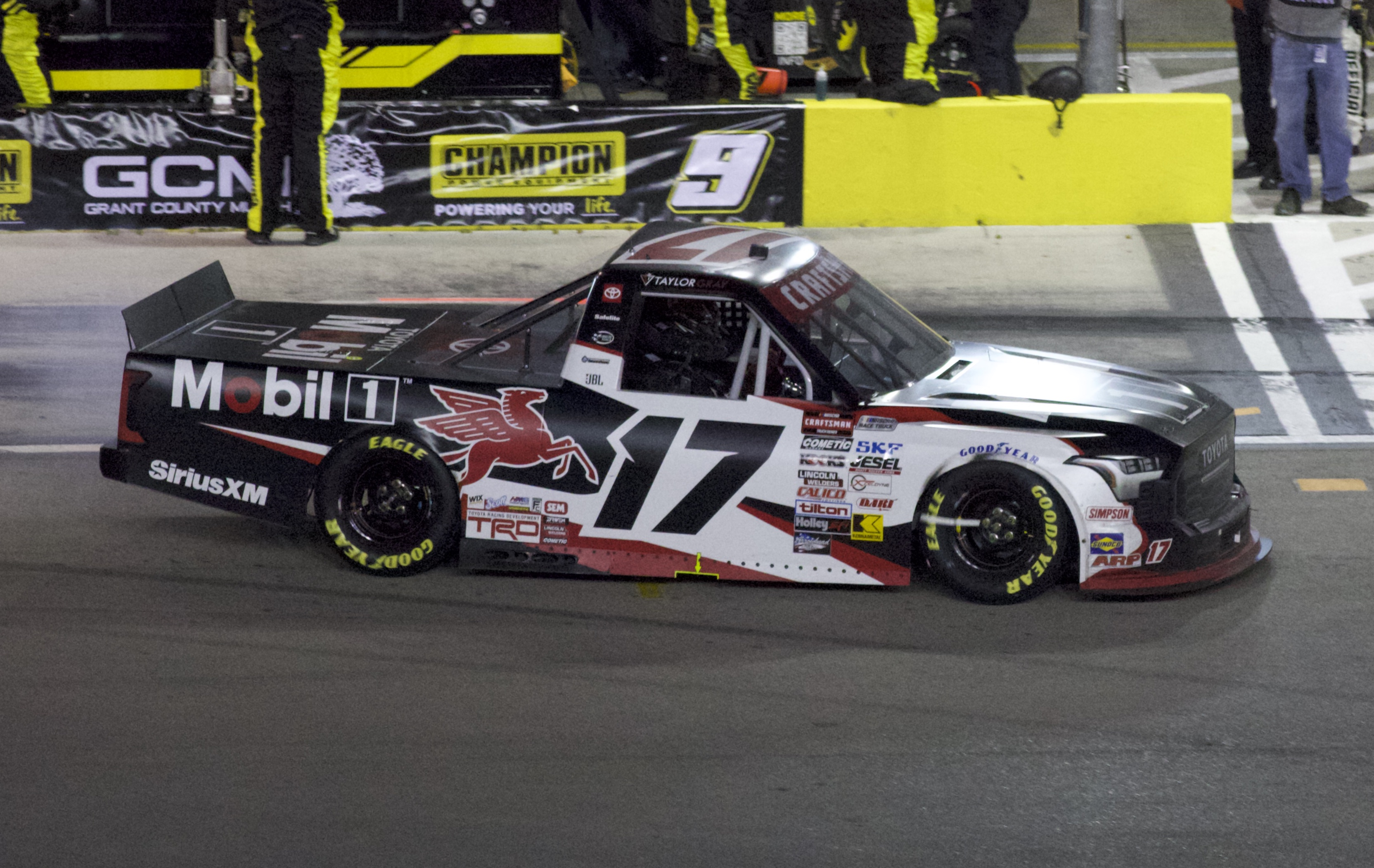
Tay. Gray at Las Vegas in 2024

Taylor Gray was announced as a TRD development driver on October 27, 2022. He was announced that he would be driving to No. 17 starting at Circuit of the Americas due to him not being old enough to run the first three races of the season.

Gio Ruggiero (2025–Present)

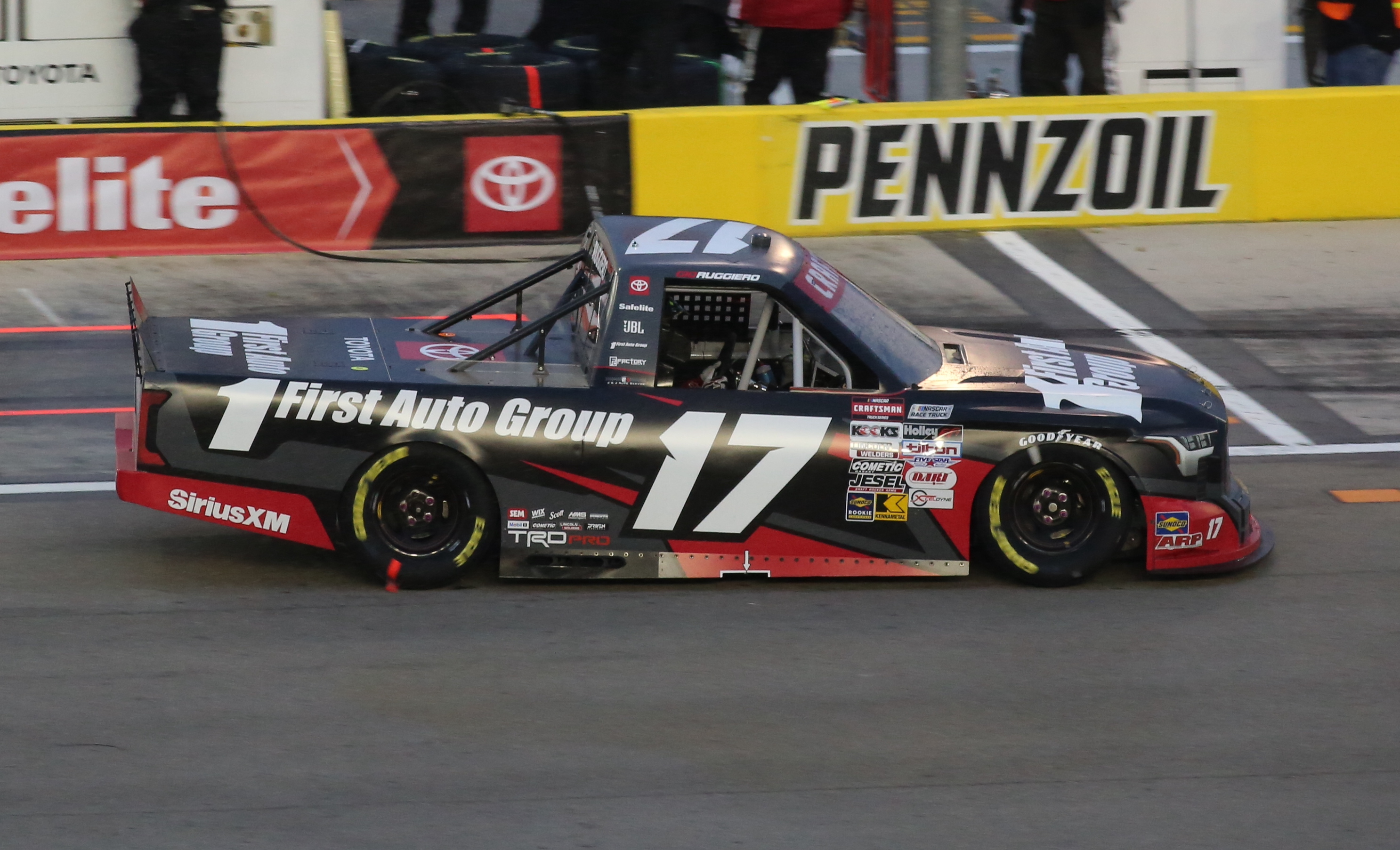
Ruggiero's No. 17 truck at Las Vegas Motor Speedway in 2025

On November 26, 2024, it was announced that Gio Ruggiero would drive for the team in the No. 17 Truck full-time in 2025. Ruggiero started the 2025 season with a second-place finish at Daytona. Despite not making the playoffs, he scored his first career win at Talladega.

On December 18, 2025, it was announced that Ruggiero will return to the team and drive the No. 17 for the 2026 season. Ruggiero started the 2026 season with a runner-up finish at Daytona. He accumulated enough points to clinch a spot in "The Chase".

==== Truck No. 17 results ====
Year	Driver	No.	Make	1	2	3	4	5	6	7	8	9	10	11	12	13	14	15	16	17	18	19	20	21	22	23	24	25	Owners	Pts
2018	Bo LeMastus	17	Toyota	DAY	ATL	LVS	MAR	DOV	KAN	CLT; DNQ	TEX; 26	IOW	GTW	CHI			POC	MCH; 17	BRI	MSP	LVS; 30	TAL				HOM			30th	171
2018	Chris Eggleston	17	Toyota												KEN; 11														30th	171
2018	Tyler Dippel	17	Toyota													ELD; 13													30th	171
2018	Kyle Benjamin	17	Toyota																				MAR; 5						30th	171
2018	David Gilliland	17	Toyota																					TEX; 30					30th	171
2018	Tyler Ankrum	17	Toyota																						PHO; 6				30th	171
2019	David Gilliland	17	Toyota	DAY; 13																									8th	2182
2019	Anthony Alfredo	17	Toyota		ATL; 17									GTW; 12															8th	2182
2019	Ryan Reed	17	Toyota			LVS; 9																							8th	2182
2019	Tyler Ankrum	17	Toyota				MAR; 19	TEX; 6	DOV; 9	KAN; 11	CLT; 27	TEX; 3			CHI; 13	KEN; 1*	POC; 2	ELD; 9	MCH; 25	BRI; 20	MSP; 9	LVS; 11	TAL; 7	MAR; 25	PHO; 26	HOM; 22			8th	2182
2019	Raphaël Lessard	17	Toyota										IOW; 9																8th	2182
2020	David Ragan	17	Ford	DAY	LVS	CLT	ATL; DNQ	HOM	POC	KEN	TEX	KAN	KAN	MCH; DNQ	DAY	DOV	GTW	DAR; 22	RCH; 7	BRI									30th	231
2020	Dylan Lupton	17	Ford																		LVS; 14	TAL		TEX; 8	MAR	PHO; 16			30th	231
2020	Hailie Deegan	17	Ford																				KAN; 16						30th	231
2021	David Gilliland	17	Ford	DAY; 14		LVS; 39					DAR; 28	COA	CLT	TEX															29th	256
2021	Riley Herbst	17	Ford		DAY; 5																								29th	256
2021	Bill Lester	17	Ford				ATL; 36																						29th	256
2021	Kevin Harvick	17	Ford					BRI; 15	RCH	KAN																			29th	256
2021	Ryan Preece	17	Ford												NSH; 1	POC; 9													29th	256
2021	Donny Schatz	17	Ford														KNX; 32												29th	256
2021	Taylor Gray	17	Ford															GLN; 35	GTW; 12	DAR	BRI; 29	LVS	TAL	MAR; 8	PHO; 29				29th	256
2022	Riley Herbst	17	Ford	DAY; 12							KAN; 12																		8th	2232
2022	Ryan Preece	17	Ford		LVS; 4	ATL; 7				DAR; 6		TEX; 3	CLT; 11				NSH; 1*		POC; 2			KAN; 3		TAL; 4	HOM; 4				8th	2232
2022	Taylor Gray	17	Ford				COA; 26	MAR; 26						GTW; 36				MOH; 15		IRP; 22	RCH; 6		BRI; 16			PHO; 17			8th	2232
2022	Harrison Burton	17	Ford						BRI; 20						SON; 12														8th	2232
2022	Todd Gilliland	17	Ford													KNX; 1													8th	2232
2023	Sammy Smith	17	Toyota	DAY; 14																									13th	561
2023	John Hunter Nemechek	17	Toyota		LVS; 31	ATL; 3																							13th	561
2023	Taylor Gray	17	Toyota				COA; 11	TEX; 24	BRD; 34	MAR; 8	KAN; 9	DAR; 21	NWS; 21	CLT; 10	GTW; 13	NSH; 14	MOH; 15	POC; 3	RCH; 14	IRP; 20	MLW; 13	KAN; 2	BRI; 5	TAL; 18	HOM; 13	PHO; 23			13th	561
2024	Taylor Gray	17	Toyota	DAY; 19	ATL; 4	LVS; 4	BRI; 7	COA; 2	MAR; 6	TEX; 7	KAN; 27	DAR; 8	NWS; 13	CLT; 12	GTW; 30	NSH; 34	POC; 4	IRP; 16	RCH; 3	MLW; 5	BRI; 12	KAN; 18	TAL; 2	HOM; 10	MAR; 4	PHO; 6			6th	2247
2025	Gio Ruggiero	17	Toyota	DAY; 2	ATL; 11	LVS; 15	HOM; 29	MAR; 12	BRI; 10	CAR; 10	TEX; 31	KAN; 4	NWS; 7	CLT; 21	NSH; 13	MCH; 12	POC; 11	LRP; 3	IRP; 25	GLN; 3	RCH; 6	DAR; 22	BRI; 13	NHA; 4	ROV; 3	TAL; 1*	MAR; 11	PHO; 31	12th	703
2026	Gio Ruggiero	17	Toyota	DAY; 2	ATL; 3	STP; 25	DAR; 8	ROC; 17	BRI; 3	TEX; 14	GLN; 15	DOV; 20	CLT; 5	NSH; 9	MCH; 17	COR; 10	LRP; 20	NWS; 6	IRP; 13	RCH; 9	NHA; 26	BRI; 6	KAN; 13	CLT; 26	PHO; 8	TAL; 25	MAR; 8	HOM; 11	7th	2242

=== Truck No. 54 history ===
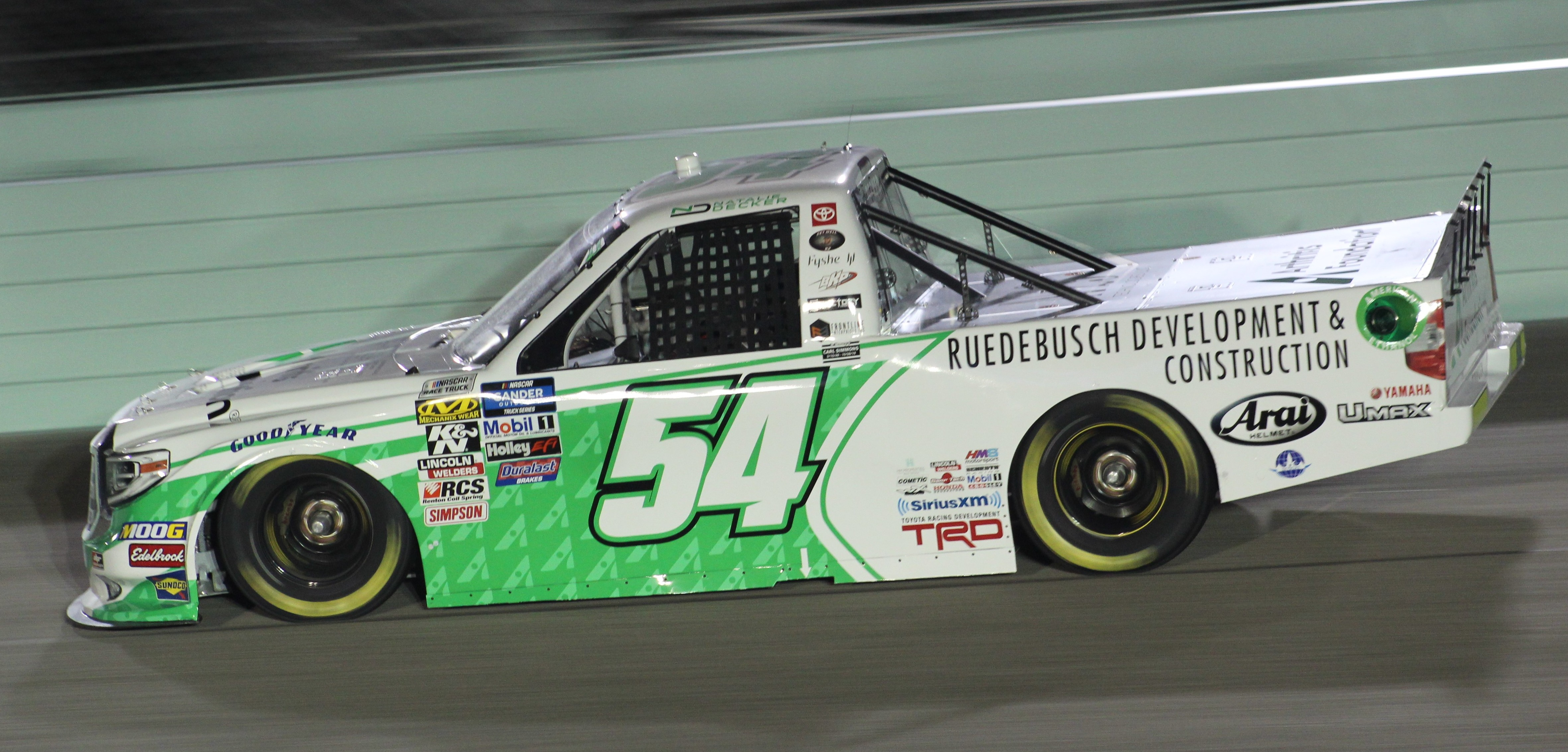
Natalie Decker in the No. 54 at Homestead–Miami Speedway in 2019

LeMastus made his Truck Series debut in the No. 54 at Daytona, getting caught up in a wreck. Various other drivers have run in this truck throughout the 2018 season, including Kyle Benjamin who finished second at Martinsville, Justin Marks at Las Vegas, and team co-owner David Gilliland. Tyler Ankrum made his Truck Series Debut at Martinsville Speedway after winning the K&N East Championship for DGR.

The No. 54 was driven by Natalie Decker, Anthony Alfredo, David Gilliland, Kyle Strickler, and Raphaël Lessard in 2019. Decker finished nineteenth, Alfredo 22nd, Lessard 32nd, Gilliland 47th, and Strickler 63rd in the points standings.

The No. 54 later returned to 2022 with Joey Logano as depicted by a report.

Truck No. 54 results

Year	Driver	No.	Make	1	2	3	4	5	6	7	8	9	10	11	12	13	14	15	16	17	18	19	20	21	22	23	Owners	Pts
2018	Bo LeMastus	54	Toyota	DAY; 30	ATL; 17				KAN; 19					CHI; 15	KEN; 20		POC; 20			MSP; 22		TAL; 29		TEX; 32			16th	497
2018	Justin Marks	54	Toyota			LVS; 11																					16th	497
2018	Kyle Benjamin	54	Toyota				MAR; 2																				16th	497
2018	David Gilliland	54	Toyota					DOV; 4				IOW; 4															16th	497
2018	Chris Eggleston	54	Toyota							CLT; 13	TEX; 14										LVS; 10						16th	497
2018	Zane Smith	54	Toyota										GTW; 5														16th	497
2018	Chris Windom	54	Toyota													ELD; 14										HOM; 24	16th	497
2018	Matt Mills	54	Toyota															MCH; 31									16th	497
2018	Riley Herbst	54	Toyota																BRI; 15						PHO; 15		16th	497
2018	Tyler Ankrum	54	Toyota																				MAR; 18				16th	497
2019	Natalie Decker	54	Toyota	DAY; 32	ATL; 24	LVS; 13			DOV; 17	KAN; 25	CLT; 31	TEX; 22	IOW; 17	GTW; 27	CHI; 14	KEN; 27	POC; 16		MCH; 27	BRI; 25		LVS; 25	TAL; 16	MAR; 22	PHO; 22	HOM; 20	20th	369
2019	David Gilliland	54	Toyota				MAR; 12																				20th	369
2019	Anthony Alfredo	54	Toyota					TEX; 28																			20th	369
2019	Kyle Strickler	54	Toyota															ELD; 18									20th	369
2019	Raphaël Lessard	54	Toyota																		MSP; 10						20th	369
2022	Joey Logano	54	Ford	DAY	LVS	ATL	COA	MAR	BRI; 6	DAR	KAN	TEX	CLT	GTW	SON	KNO	NSH	MOH	POC	IRP	RCH	KAN	BRI	TAL	HOM	PHO	43rd	44

== ARCA Menards Series ==
=== Car No. 4 history ===
In 2019, DGR-Crosley fielded the No. 4 Toyota for Todd Gilliland at Daytona and Talladega. He won the race at Talladega. Drew Dollar competed in two ARCA Menards Series races in the No. 4 Toyota at both Gateway and Kansas, finishing 6th and 7th, respectfully.

On December 17, 2019, DGR-Crosley announced Hailie Deegan as the driver of the No. 4 Ford Fusion for the 2020 ARCA Menards Series season.

==== Car No. 4 results ====
Year	Driver	No.	Make	1	2	3	4	5	6	7	8	9	10	11	12	13	14	15	16	17	18	19	20	Owners	Pts
2019	Todd Gilliland	4	Toyota	DAY; 2	FIF	SLM	TAL; 1	NSH	TOL	CLT	POC	MCH	MAD												
2019	Drew Dollar	4	Toyota											GTW; 6	CHI	ELK	IOW	POC	ISF	DSF	SLM	IRP	KAN; 7		
2020	Hailie Deegan	4	Ford	DAY; 2	PHO; 7	TAL; 7	POC; 7	IRP; 3	KEN; 14	IOW; 18	KAN; 9	TOL; 8	TOL; 6	MCH; 6	DRC; 6	GTW; 9	L44; 5*	TOL; 6	BRI; 6	WIN; 12	MEM; 7	ISF; 2	KAN; 6	3rd	887

=== Car No. 17 history ===
In 2020, DGR-Crosley field the No. 17 Ford Fusion full-time for Tanner Gray and his brother Taylor Gray along with Dylan Lupton and Anthony Alfredo.

On March 8, 2022 a hauler carrying the car on its way to Phoenix Raceway collided with a Honda Passport near Longview, Texas, killing hauler driver Steven C. Stotts. Two passengers in the hauler and the driver of the SUV survived the accident. Three days later on March 11, Gray won the General Tire 150 after starting second and leading 43 laps, dedicating the win to Stotts.

==== Car No. 17 results ====
Year	Driver	No.	Make	1	2	3	4	5	6	7	8	9	10	11	12	13	14	15	16	17	18	19	20	Owners	Pts
2020	Tanner Gray	17	Ford	DAY; 16	PHO; 4	TAL; 13	POC; 15		KEN; 9		KAN; 5														
2020	Taylor Gray	17	Ford					IRP; 4		IOW; 5		TOL; 3	TOL; 11		DRC; 4	GTW; 8	L44; 3	TOL; 5	BRI; 7	WIN; 5	MEM; 9	ISF; 4			
2020	Anthony Alfredo	17	Ford											MCH; 5											
2020	Dylan Lupton	17	Ford																				KAN; 4		
2021	Tanner Gray	17	Ford	DAY; 7																					
2021	Taylor Gray	17	Ford		PHO; 9	TAL	KAN	TOL	CLT	MOH	POC	ELK; 5	BLN; 4	IOW; 3	WIN; 5	GLN; 7	MCH	ISF	MLW; 4	DSF	BRI; 3	SLM; 11	KAN		
2022	Taylor Gray	17	Ford	DAY	PHO; 1	TAL	KAN	CLT	IOW; 18	BLN; 4	ELK; 4	MOH; 1	POC; 1*	IRP; 3	MCH	GLN; 8	ISF; 8	MLW; 2	DSF; 12	KAN	BRI; 3	SLM; 5	TOL; 4		
2023	Taylor Gray	17	Toyota	DAY	PHO	TAL	KAN; 3	CLT; 3	BLN	ELK	MOH	IOW	POC	MCH	IRP	GLN	ISF	MLW	DSF	KAN	BRI	SLM	TOL		

=== Car No. 46 history ===
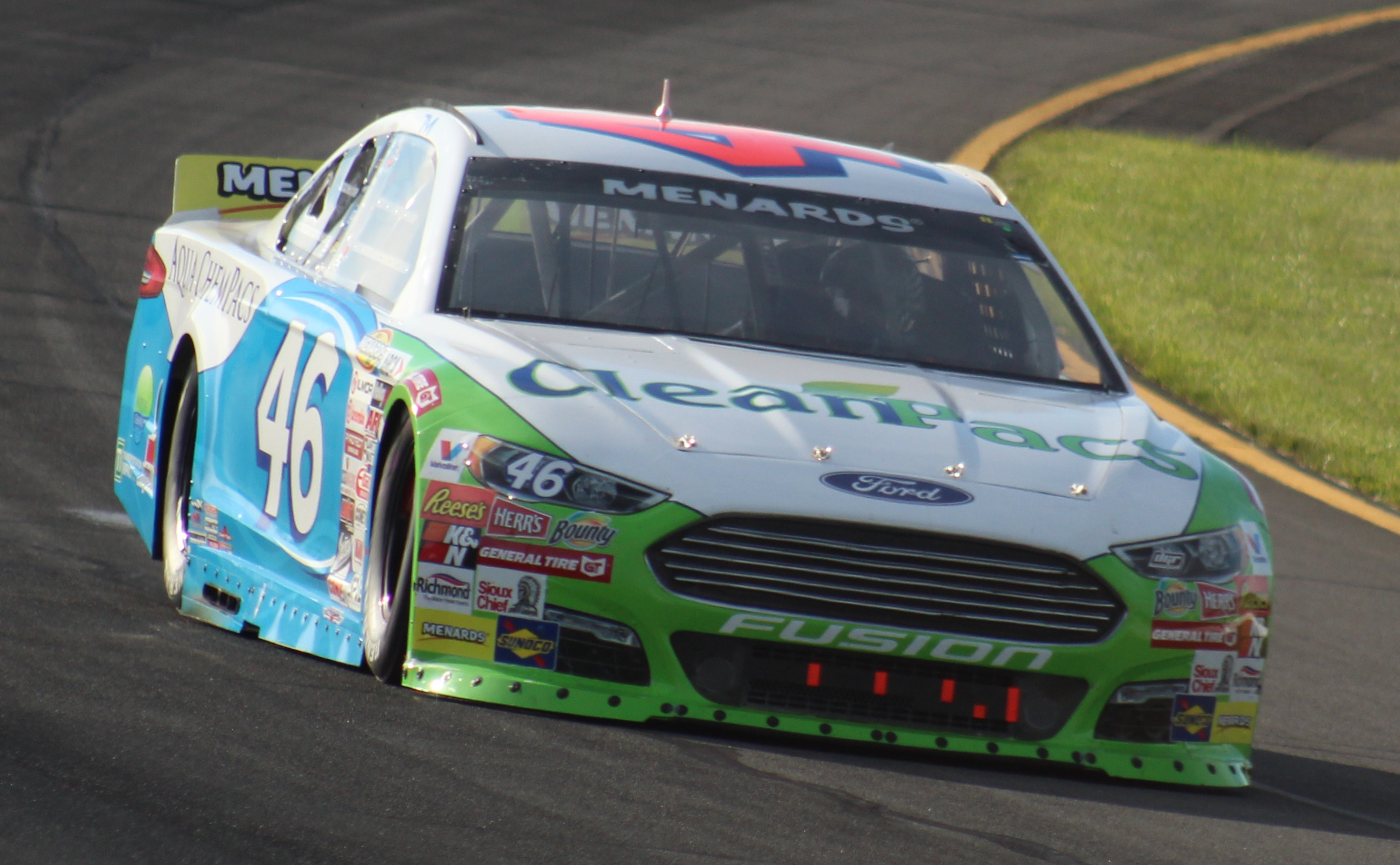
Thad Moffit at Pocono in 2021.

In 2020, it was announced that Thad Moffitt would drive the No. 46 for the season-opening race at Daytona, and would then run all races on the schedule until sponsorship dried up, plus Memphis, which the team had previously signed a sponsor for. He claimed three top-five finishes over thirteen races, with a career-best finish of fourth at Memphis.

In 2021, it was announced that Moffitt would return to this car for at least eleven races.

==== Car No. 46 results ====
Year	Driver	No.	Make	1	2	3	4	5	6	7	8	9	10	11	12	13	14	15	16	17	18	19	20	Owners	Pts
2020	Thad Moffitt	46	Ford	DAY; 5	PHO; 18	TAL; 6	POC; 20	IRP; 5	KEN; 15	IOW; 10	KAN; 10	TOL; 12	TOL; 8	MCH; 9	DRC; 11	GTW	L44	TOL	BRI	WIN	MEM; 4	ISF	KAN		
2021	Thad Moffitt	46	Ford	DAY; 21	PHO; 3	TAL; 6	KAN; 6	TOL; 5	CLT; 7	MOH; 3	POC; 5	ELK; 9	BLN; 12	IOW; 6	WIN; 4	GLN; 11	MCH; 8		MLW; 9		BRI; 25				
2021	Taylor Gray	46	Ford															ISF; 3		DSF; 5					
2021	J. P. Bergeron	46	Ford																			SLM; 8	KAN; 5		

=== Car No. 51 history ===
In 2022, it was announced that Andrés Pérez de Lara would drive the No. 51 at Bristol

==== Car No. 51 results ====
Year	Driver	No.	Make	1	2	3	4	5	6	7	8	9	10	11	12	13	14	15	16	17	18	19	20	Owners	Pts
2022	Andrés Pérez de Lara	51	Ford	DAY	PHO	TAL	KAN	CLT	IOW	BLN	ELK	MOH	POC	IRP	MCH	GLN	ISF	MLW	DSF	KAN	BRI; 7	SLM	TOL		

=== Car No. 54 history ===
In 2018, Noah Gragson was named as the first driver of the No. 54 and drove the entry in the Lucas Oil 200 at Daytona, finishing in seventh place. Gragson, Todd Gilliland and Bo LeMastus all made starts in the car during 2018.

==== Car No. 54 results ====
Year	Driver	No.	Make	1	2	3	4	5	6	7	8	9	10	11	12	13	14	15	16	17	18	19	20	Owners	Pts
2018	Noah Gragson	54	Toyota	DAY; 7	NSH	SLM				POC; 10	MCH	MAD	GTW												
2018	Bo LeMastus	54	Toyota				TAL; 26	TOL																	
2018	Todd Gilliland	54	Toyota						CLT; 4*					CHI; 3	IOW	ELK	POC; 6	ISF	BLN	DSF	SLM	IRP	KAN; 22		
2019	Natalie Decker	54	Toyota	DAY; 6			TAL; 23																		
2019	Tanner Gray	54	Toyota		FIF; 12	SLM; 7	TAL	NSH	TOL; 8	CLT; 6	POC	MCH; 5	MAD	GTW; 17	CHI; 15	ELK	IOW	POC	ISF	DSF	SLM	IRP	KAN; 6		
2021	Joey Iest	54	Ford	DAY	PHO	TAL	KAN	TOL	CLT	MOH	POC	ELK	BLN	IOW; 20	WIN				MLW; 8	DSF	BRI; 19	SLM	KAN		
2021	Riley Herbst	54	Ford													GLN; 6	MCH	ISF							

== ARCA Menards Series East ==
=== Car No. 1 history ===
Derek Kraus debuted the car at New Hampshire Motor Speedway in late 2018, finishing second. He returned for the season finale at Dover International Speedway.

==== Car No. 1 results ====
Year	Driver	No.	Make	1	2	3	4	5	6	7	8	9	10	11	12	13	14	Owners	Pts
2018	Derek Kraus	1	Toyota	NSM	BRI	LGY	SBO	SBO	MEM	NJM	TMP	NHA	IOW	GLN	GTW	NHA; 2	DOV; 3		

=== Car No. 4 history ===
Hailie Deegan drove the No. 4 car at Toledo and Bristol in 2020.

==== Car No. 4 results ====
Year	Driver	No.	Make	1	2	3	4	5	6	Owners	Pts
2020	Hailie Deegan	4	Ford	NSM	TOL	DOV	TOL; 6	BRI; 6	FIF		

=== Car No. 15 history ===
Tanner Gray drove the No. 15 car full-time in 2019. He got his first career win at South Boston Speedway and finished third in the standings.

==== Car No. 15 results ====
Year	Driver	No.	Make	1	2	3	4	5	6	7	8	9	10	11	12	Owners	Pts
2019	Tanner Gray	15	Toyota	NSM; 12	BRI; 10	SBO; 1*	SBO; 4	MEM; 3	NHA; 5	IOW; 6	GLN; 11	BRI; 6	GTW; 15	NHA; 2	DOV; 2		

=== Car No. 17 history ===
The No. 17 debuted at the beginning of 2018 with Tyler Ankrum, who finished in fifth place at New Smyrna Speedway. Ankrum won four races in 2018; victories came at South Boston Speedway, Thompson Speedway, Iowa Speedway and New Hampshire Motor Speedway. Ankrum clinched the championship with one race remaining ahead of Tyler Dippel.

In 2019, DGR-Crosley fielded the No. 17 part-time for various drivers including Ty Gibbs and Riley Herbst. On September 21, Gibbs scored his first career win at the Apple Barrel 125 at New Hampshire Motor Speedway.

==== Car No. 17 results ====
Year	Driver	No.	Make	1	2	3	4	5	6	7	8	9	10	11	12	13	14	Owners	Pts
2018	Tyler Ankrum	17	Toyota	NSM; 5	BRI; 4	LGY; 3	SBO; 1*	SBO; 3	MEM; 2	NJM; 9	TMP; 1	NHA; 1**	IOW; 1	GLN; 7	GTW; 6	NHA; 13	DOV; 11	1st	574
2019	Ty Gibbs	17	Toyota	NSM; 2				MEM; 2		IOW; 2	GLN; 4	BRI; 2	GTW						
2019	Riley Herbst	17	Toyota		BRI; 18	SBO	SBO		NHA; 6										
2019	Drew Dollar	17	Toyota												DOV; 4				
2020	Tanner Gray	17	Ford	NSM; 18															
2020	Taylor Gray	17	Ford		TOL; 8	DOV; 9	TOL; 5	BRI; 7	FIF; 4										
2021	Taylor Gray	17	Ford	NSM; 3	FIF; 3				IOW; 3	MLW; 4	BRI; 3								
2021	David Gilliland	17	Ford			DOV; 3	SNM	IOW											
2022	Taylor Gray	17	Ford	NSM; 2	FIF; 3	DOV; 1*	NSV; 3	IOW; 18	MLW; 2	BRI; 3									

=== Car No. 20 history ===
Cup regular Erik Jones drove a car for the team at Watkins Glen in 2018.

==== Car No. 20 results ====
Year	Driver	No.	Make	1	2	3	4	5	6	7	8	9	10	11	12	13	14	Owners	Pts
2018	Erik Jones	20	Toyota	NSM	BRI	LGY	SBO	SBO	MEM	NJM	TMP	NHA	IOW	GLN; 19	GTW	NHA	DOV		

=== Car No. 46 history ===
Thad Moffitt drove the No. 46 car at Iowa, Milwaukee, and Bristol in 2021.

==== Car No. 46 results ====
Year	Driver	No.	Make	1	2	3	4	5	6	7	8	Owners	Pts
2021	Thad Moffitt	46	Ford	NSM	FIF	NSV	DOV	SNM	IOW; 6	MLW; 9	BRI; 25		

=== Car No. 51 history ===
In 2022, Andrés Pérez de Lara drove the No. 51 at Bristol.

==== Car No. 51 results ====
Year	Driver	No.	Make	1	2	3	4	5	6	7	Owners	Pts
2022	Andrés Pérez de Lara	51	Ford	NSM	FIF	DOV	NSV	IOW	MLW	BRI; 7		

=== Car No. 54 history ===
Todd Gilliland ran the No. 54 at the 2018 New Smyrna 175, scoring DGR-Crosley's first victory with a last lap pass on Harrison Burton. Noah Gragson ran the following race at Bristol Motor Speedway. Tyler Dippel then joined the team, winning the following race at Langley Speedway. After a tumultuous season which included intentionally spinning teammate and eventual champion Tyler Ankrum at New Jersey Motorsports Park, Dippel left the car after the season's penultimate race and Todd Gilliland endcapped the season in the car.

In 2019, Legends car driver Drew Dollar drove the car full-time.

==== Car No. 54 results ====
Year	Driver	No.	Make	1	2	3	4	5	6	7	8	9	10	11	12	13	14	Owners	Pts
2018	Todd Gilliland	54	Toyota	NSM; 1*													DOV; 14		
2018	Noah Gragson	54	Toyota		BRI; 3														
2018	Tyler Dippel	54	Toyota			LGY; 1	SBO; 5	SBO; 2	MEM; 3	NJM; 11	TMP; 3	NHA; 4	IOW; 6	GLN; 15	GTW; 12	NHA; 12			
2019	Drew Dollar	54	Toyota	NSM; 9	BRI; 4	SBO; 12	SBO; 6	MEM; 7	NHA; 8	IOW; 7									
2019	Riley Herbst	54	Toyota								GLN; 12								
2019	Hailie Deegan	54	Toyota									BRI; 9							
2019	David Gilliland	54	Toyota										GTW; 3						
2019	Ty Gibbs	54	Toyota											NHA; 1*					
2019	Todd Gilliland	54	Toyota												DOV; 3				
2020	David Gilliland	54	Ford	NSM	TOL	DOV; 2	TOL	BRI	FIF										
2021	Joey Iest	54	Ford	NSM; 5	FIF; 5	NSV; 5	DOV; 8	SNM; 2	IOW; 20	MLW; 8	BRI; 19								

=== Car No. 98 history ===
Todd Gilliland ran this car in 2018 at Bristol Motor Speedway, leading the most laps and winning the race. Noah Gragson ran the 98 at Watkins Glen.

Natalie Decker ran the 98 in 2019 at Bristol Motor Speedway.

==== Car No. 98 results ====
Year	Driver	No.	Make	1	2	3	4	5	6	7	8	9	10	11	12	13	14	Owners	Pts
2018	Todd Gilliland	98	Toyota	NSM	BRI; 1*	LGY	SBO	SBO	MEM	NJM	THO	NHA	IOW						
2018	Noah Gragson	98	Toyota											GLN; 20	GTW				
2018	Riley Herbst	98	Toyota													NHA; 4	DOV		
2019	Natalie Decker	98	Toyota	NSM	BRI; 19	SBO	SBO	MEM	NHA	IOW	GLN	BRI	GTW	NHA	DOV				

== ARCA Menards Series West ==
=== Car No. 4 history ===
Team owner David Gilliland drove this car in 2020 at Phoenix Raceway and won.

==== Car No. 4 results ====
Year	Driver	No.	Make	1	2	3	4	5	6	7	8	9	10	11	Owners	Pts
2020	David Gilliland	4	Ford	LVS	MMP	MMP	IRW	EVG	DCS	CNS	LVS	AAS	KCR	PHO; 1		

=== Car No. 15 history ===
The No. 15 will be run in select events for Tanner Gray. After skipping the first race, Gray has finished runner-up in all three starts.

==== Car No. 15 results ====
Year	Driver	No.	Make	1	2	3	4	5	6	7	8	9	10	11	12	13	14	Owners	Pts
2019	Tanner Gray	15	Toyota	LVS	IRW; 2	TUS; 2	TUS; 2	CNS	SON	DCS	IOW; 6	EVG	GTW; 15	MER	AAS	KCR			
2019	Drew Dollar	15	Toyota														PHO; 15		

=== Car No. 17 history ===
The No. 17 run 5 races with Taylor Gray in 2020. Gray won once at Kern County Raceway Park.

==== Car No. 17 results ====
Year	Driver	No.	Make	1	2	3	4	5	6	7	8	9	10	11	Owners	Pts
2020	Taylor Gray	17	Ford	LVS	MMP; 4	MMP; 11	IRW	EVG	DCS	CNS	LVS	AAS; 7*	KCR; 1*	PHO; 3	13th	161
2021	Taylor Gray	17	Ford	PHO; 9	SON	IRW	CNS	IRW	PIR; 1	LVS; 1*	AAS; 22	PHO				
2022	Taylor Gray	17	Ford	PHO; 1	IRW	KCR	PIR	SON	IRW	EVG	PIR	AAS	LVS	PHO		

=== Car No. 20 history ===
The No. 20 debuted at the 2018 Carneros 200 at Sonoma Raceway driven by NASCAR Cup Series driver Erik Jones with sponsorship from DeWalt.

==== Car No. 20 results ====
Year	Driver	No.	Make	1	2	3	4	5	6	7	8	9	10	11	12	13	14	Owners	Pts
2018	Erik Jones	20	Toyota	KCR	TUS	TUS	OSS	CNS	SON; 6	DCS	IOW	EVG	GTW	LVS	MER	AAS	KCR		

=== Car No. 45 history ===
Jake Garcia drove the No. 45 car at the General Tire 150 at Phoenix Raceway in 2021.

==== Car No. 45 results ====
Year	Driver	No.	Make	1	2	3	4	5	6	7	8	9	Owners	Pts
2021	Jake Garcia	45	Ford	PHO	SON	IRW	CNS	IRW	PIR	LVS	AAS	PHO; 6		

=== Car No. 46 history ===
The No. 46 car debuted at the General Tire 150 at Phoenix Raceway driven by Thad Moffitt, later at the second Phoenix race next year with J.P. Bergeron.

==== Car No. 46 results ====
Year	Driver	No.	Make	1	2	3	4	5	6	7	8	9	Owners	Pts
2021	Thad Moffitt	46	Ford	PHO; 3	SON	IRW	CNS	IRW	PIR	LVS	AAS			
2021	J.P. Bergeron	46	Ford									PHO; 5		

=== Car No. 51 history ===
In 2022, Andrés Pérez de Lara drove the No. 51 at the last two events of the season.

==== Car No. 51 results ====
Year	Driver	No.	Make	1	2	3	4	5	6	7	8	9	10	11	Owners	Pts
2022	Andrés Pérez de Lara	51	Ford	PHO	IRW	KCR	PIR	SON	IRW	EVG	PIR	AAS	LVS; 2	PHO; 3		

=== Car No. 54 history ===
The No. 54 debuted at the 2018 Carneros 200 at Sonoma Raceway driven by NASCAR Cup Series driver Daniel Suárez with sponsorship from Arris.

==== Car No. 54 results ====
Year	Driver	No.	Make	1	2	3	4	5	6	7	8	9	10	11	12	13	14	Owners	Pts
2018	Daniel Suárez	54	Toyota	KCR	TUS	TUS	OSS	CNS	SON; 4	DCS	IOW	EVG	GTW	LVS	MER	AAS	KCR		
2020	Todd Gilliland	54	Ford	LVS	MMP	MMP	IRW	EVG	DCS	CNS	LVS	AAS	KCR	PHO; 4					

=== Car No. 71 history ===
Taylor Gray drove the No. 71 car at the General Tire 150 at Phoenix Raceway in 2021.

==== Car No. 71 results ====
Year	Driver	No.	Make	1	2	3	4	5	6	7	8	9	10	11	Owners	Pts
2021	Taylor Gray	71	Ford	PHO	SON	IRW	CNS	IRW	PIR	LVS	AAS	PHO; 2				
2022	Taylor Gray	71	Ford	PHO	IRW	KCR	PIR	SON	IRW	EVG	PIR	AAS	LVS; 1*	PHO; 27		

== Late model racing ==
David Gilliland Racing debuted in 2014 in the X-1R Pro Cup Series, the predecessor to the CARS Tour, fielding the No. 98 for Todd Gilliland. From 2015 to 2017 DGR ran Super Late Models, fielding multiple cars for multiple drivers including; Todd Gilliland, Raphaël Lessard, Nicole Behar, Alex Guenette, Anthony Anders, Tanner Thorson, Chase Purdy, and Hannah Newhouse.

DGR decided not to run Super Late Models in 2018 due to their transition to DGR-Crosley and their entry into the Truck Series and ARCA Menards Series, they switched to fielding late models starting in 2019.

Taylor Gray and Drew Dollar were late model drivers for the team in 2019. Taylor Gray drove part-time in the CARS Tour in 2020 picking up a win in the opening round. Joe Valento was announced to run the full season for DGR in the CARS Tour in 2021.
