= Vince Little =

American racing driver

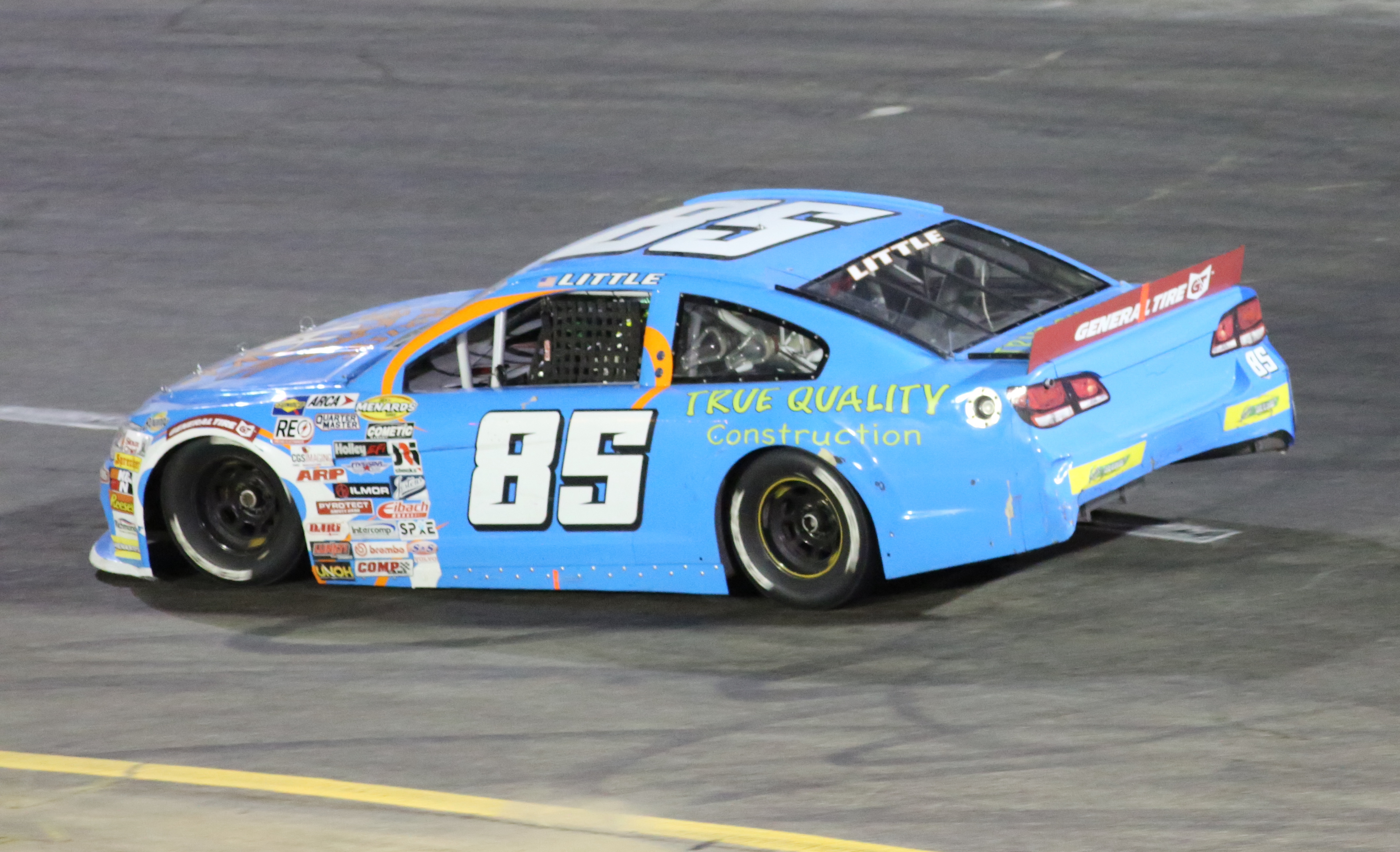
- Little's No. 85 car at All American Speedway in 2022
- Born: March 31, 1964 (age 62); Clovis, California, U.S.

ARCA Menards Series West career
- 5 races run over 1 year
- Best finish: 22nd (2022)
- First race: 2022 Portland 112 (Portland)
- Last race: 2022 Star Nursery 150 (LVMS Bullring)
Wins	Top tens	Poles
0	0	0
- Statistics up to date as of January 29, 2025.

Vince Little (born March 31, 1964) is an American professional stock car racing driver who has competed in five races in the ARCA Menards Series West in 2022, having last driven the No. 85 Chevrolet for Last Chance Racing.

Little has also previously competed in the NASCAR Southwest Series.

== Motorsports results ==
=== ARCA Menards Series West ===
(key) (Bold – Pole position awarded by qualifying time. Italics – Pole position earned by points standings or practice time. * – Most laps led. ** – All laps led.)

ARCA Menards Series West results
Year	Team	No.	Make	1	2	3	4	5	6	7	8	9	10	11	AMSWC	Pts	Ref
2022	Last Chance Racing	85	Chevy	PHO	IRW	KCR	PIR; 14	SON; 11	IRW	EVG	PIR; 11	AAS; 14	LVS; 16	PHO	22nd	154	
