= Sebastian Arias =

Colombian racing driver

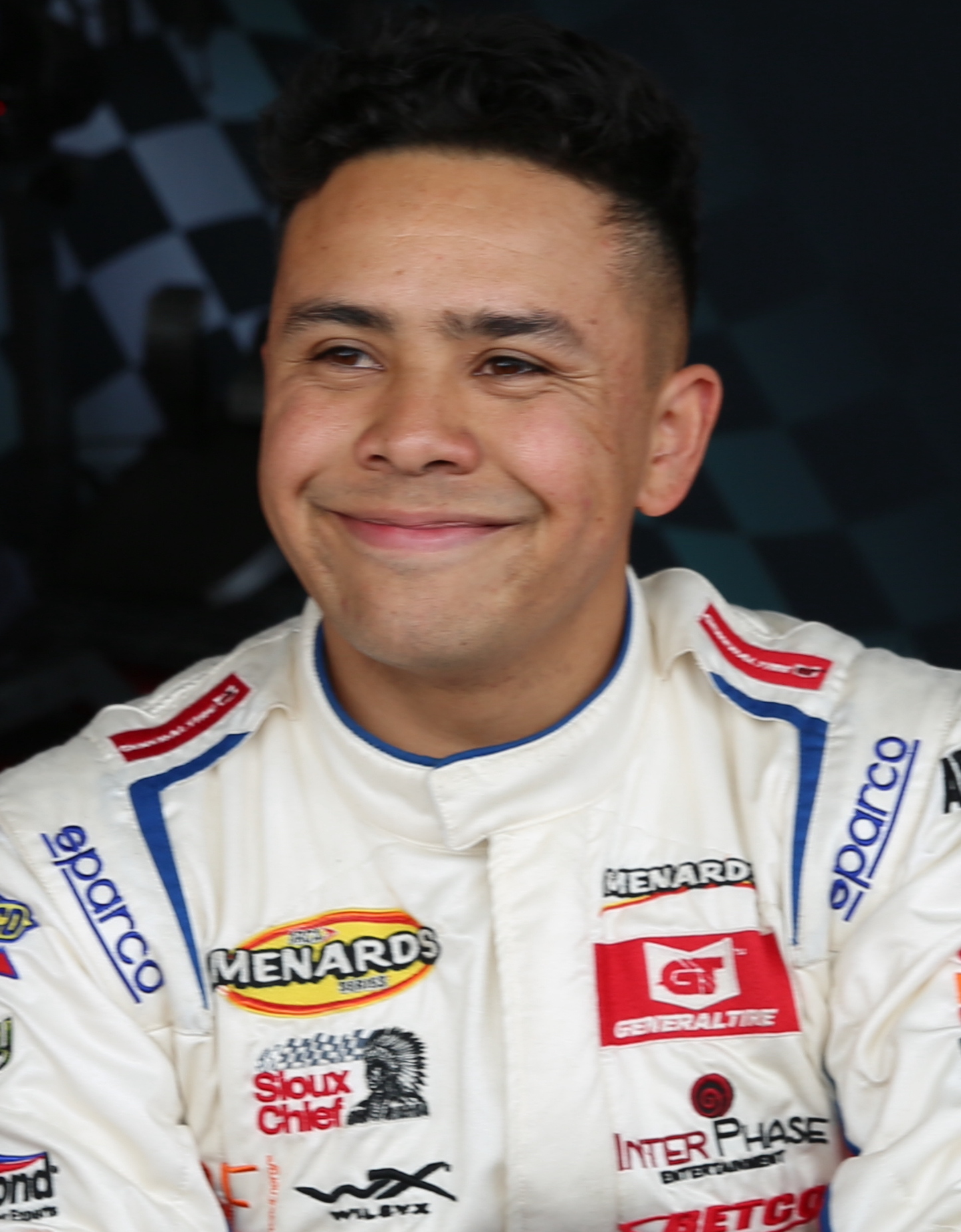
- Arias at Sonoma Raceway in 2023
- Born: October 28, 1998 (age 28); Bogotá, Colombia

ARCA Menards Series career
- 3 races run over 2 years
- Best finish: 62nd (2024)
- First race: 2022 General Tire 150 (Phoenix)
- Last race: 2024 Reese's 150 (Kansas)
Wins	Top tens	Poles
0	1	0

ARCA Menards Series West career
- 11 races run over 3 years
- Best finish: 12th (2022)
- First race: 2021 Arizona Lottery 100 (Phoenix)
- Last race: 2024 Desert Diamond Casino West Valley 100 (Phoenix)
Wins	Top tens	Poles
0	3	0
- Statistics up to date as of November 15, 2024.

Sebastian Arias (born October 28, 1998) is a Colombian professional stock car racing driver who last competed part-time in the ARCA Menards Series, driving the No. 9 Chevrolet SS for Rev Racing, and part-time in the ARCA Menards Series West, driving the No. 2 Chevrolet SS for the same team.

== Racing career ==
=== Early career ===
Arias would start racing at the age of eleven, after his father sold his family home to buy him a Legends car. He competed in several races in his home country, and would eventually race go-karts in Europe. Arias would later gain interest in NASCAR, after getting inspiration from current IndyCar series driver, Juan Pablo Montoya, who raced in the series at the time. He and his family moved to Miami, Florida, to run late model races. In 2017, he drove for two races in the Southern Pro Am Truck Series, which were both at the Homestead-Miami Speedway Road Course. He would finish third and fourth respectably. He continued to race late models in 2019, driving in the 602 Super Limited Series race at Caraway Speedway, finishing in tenth.

=== ARCA ===
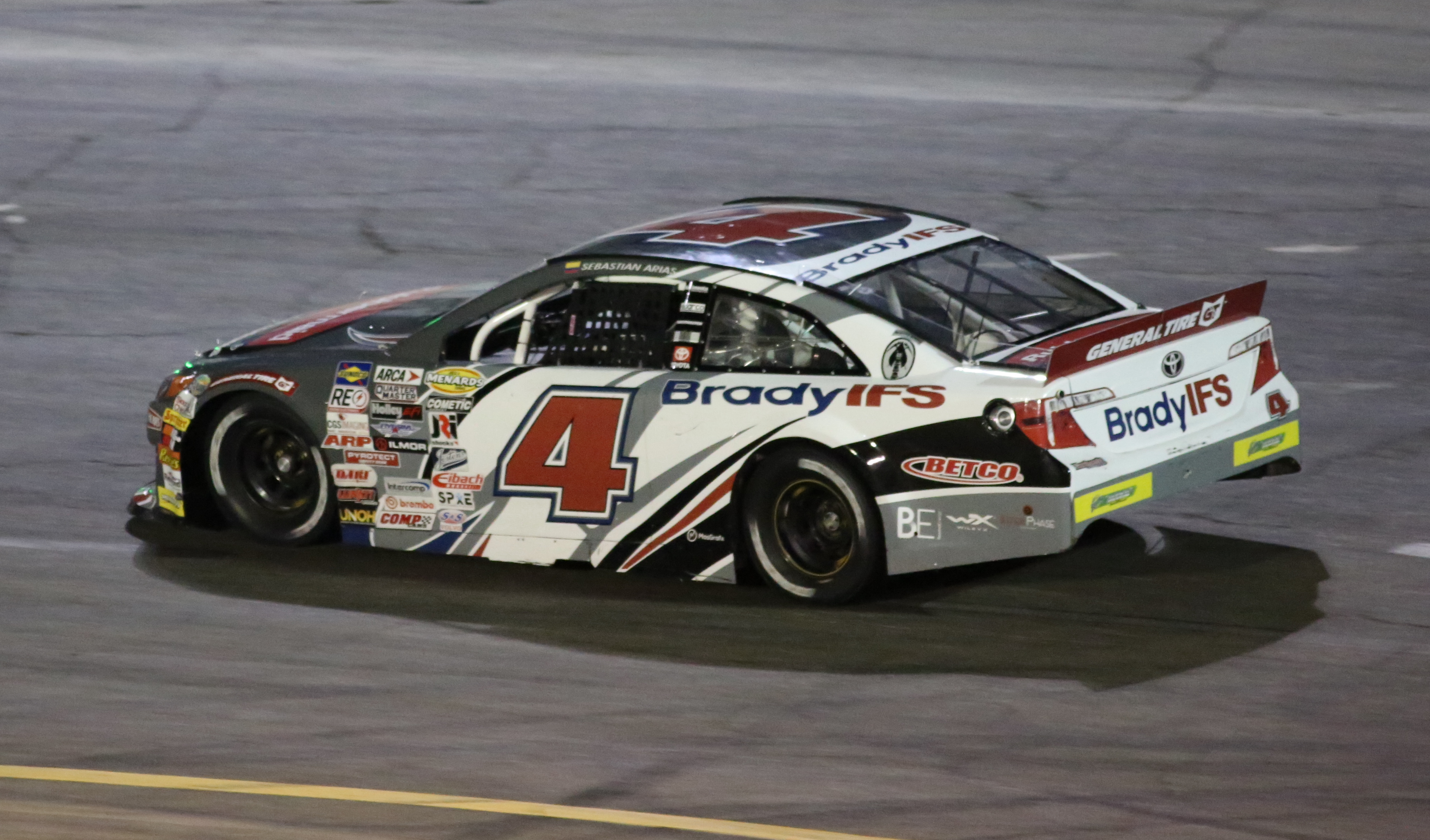
Arias' No. 4 car at All American Speedway in 2022

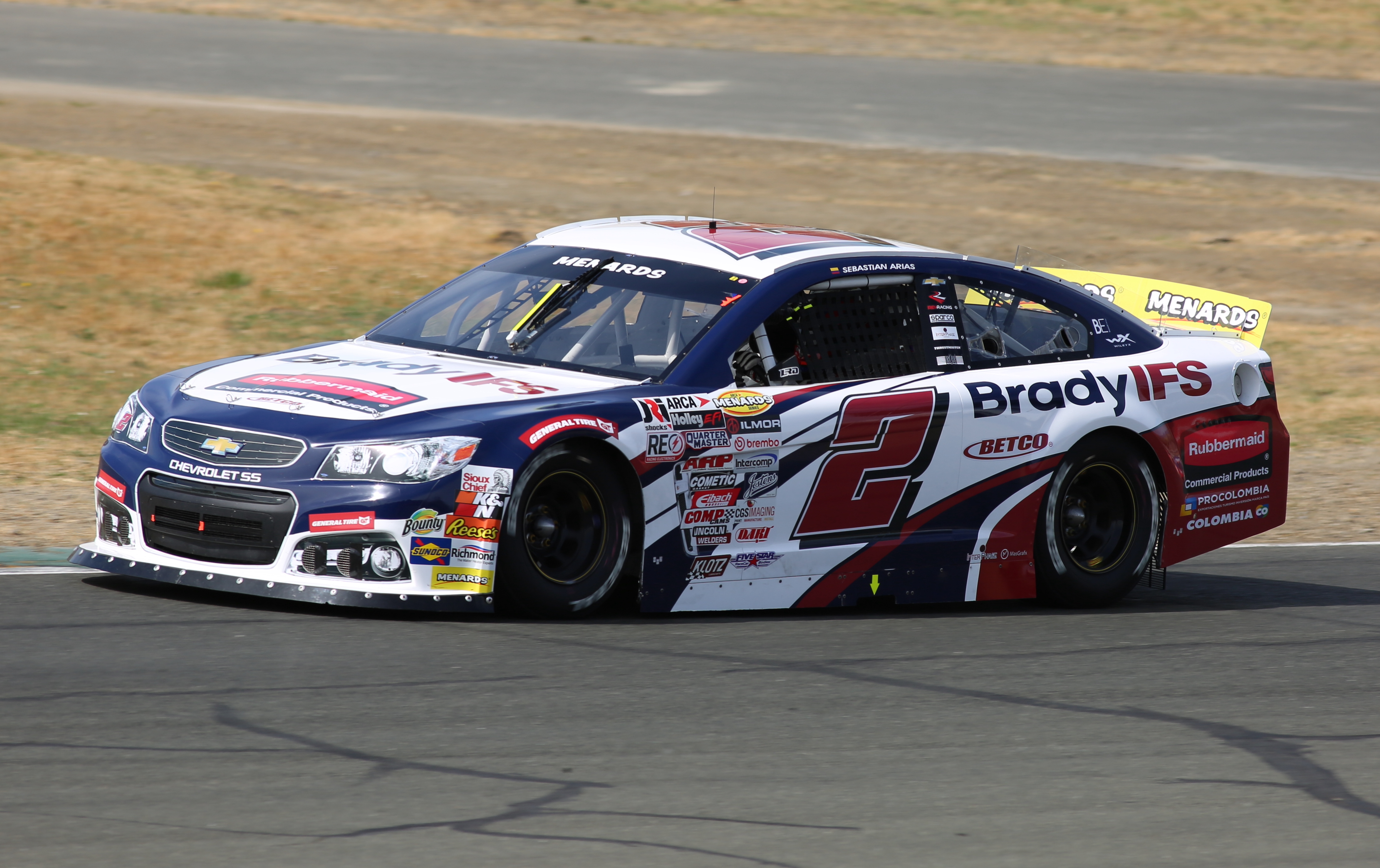
Aria's No. 2 ARCA car at Sonoma in 2023

On August 12, 2021, Arias would sign with Bill McAnally Racing, to drive for two races in the ARCA Menards Series West. He would officially be the second Colombian racer to drive in a NASCAR-sanctioned race, following Juan Pablo Montoya. He was scheduled to make his first start at the Irwindale Event Center, but would end up not starting the race, after his car hit the outside wall during qualifying. He would make his official start at the final race of the season, Phoenix Raceway. He started 30th and would finish 26th. In March 2022, he would sign a seven race deal with Nascimento Motorsports. It would eventually be a full-time deal. His first top-10 finish came at Irwindale, where he finished eighth. Arias also made his ARCA Menards Series debut at the 2022 General Tire 150, which was a collaboration race with the West Series. On February 21, 2023, it was announced that Arias would run two West Series races (Sonoma and the season-finale at Phoenix) for Rev Racing. He would run his races in the No. 2, finishing 21st and Sonoma and finishing tenth at Phoenix.

In 2024, it was revealed that Arias would run the No. 9 Chevrolet for Rev Racing at Charlotte Motor Speedway. After placing nineteenth in the lone practice session, he qualified in eighteenth and finished in tenth place.

== Motorsports career results ==
=== ARCA Menards Series ===
(key) (Bold – Pole position awarded by qualifying time. Italics – Pole position earned by points standings or practice time. * – Most laps led.)

ARCA Menards Series results
Year	Team	No.	Make	1	2	3	4	5	6	7	8	9	10	11	12	13	14	15	16	17	18	19	20	AMSC	Pts	Ref
2022	Nascimento Motorsports	4	Toyota	DAY	PHO; 25	TAL	KAN	CLT	IOW	BLN	ELK	MOH	POC	IRP	MCH	GLN	ISF	MLW	DSF	KAN	BRI	SLM	TOL	114th	19	
2024	Rev Racing	9	Chevy	DAY	PHO	TAL	DOV	KAN	CLT; 10	IOW	MOH	BLN	IRP	SLM	ELK	MCH	ISF	MLW	DSF	GLN	BRI	KAN; 17	TOL	62nd	61	

==== ARCA Menards Series West ====
ARCA Menards Series West results
Year	Team	No.	Make	1	2	3	4	5	6	7	8	9	10	11	12	AMSWC	Pts	Ref
2021	Bill McAnally Racing	5	Toyota	PHO	SON	IRW	CNS	IRW; DNS	PIR	LVS	AAS					61st	21	
2021	Bill McAnally Racing	19	Toyota									PHO; 26				61st	21	
2022	Nascimento Motorsports	4	Toyota	PHO; 25	IRW; 8	KCR; 13	PIR	SON; 21	IRW; 8	EVG	PIR	AAS; 13	LVS	PHO; 14		12th	254	
2023	Rev Racing	2	Chevy	PHO	IRW	KCR	PIR	SON; 21	IRW	SHA	EVG	AAS	LVS	MAD	PHO; 10	33rd	57	
2024	Rev Racing	2	Chevy	PHO	KER	PIR	SON	IRW	IRW	SHA	TRI	MAD	AAS	KER	PHO; 16	64th	28	
