= Andrew Tuttle =

American racing driver

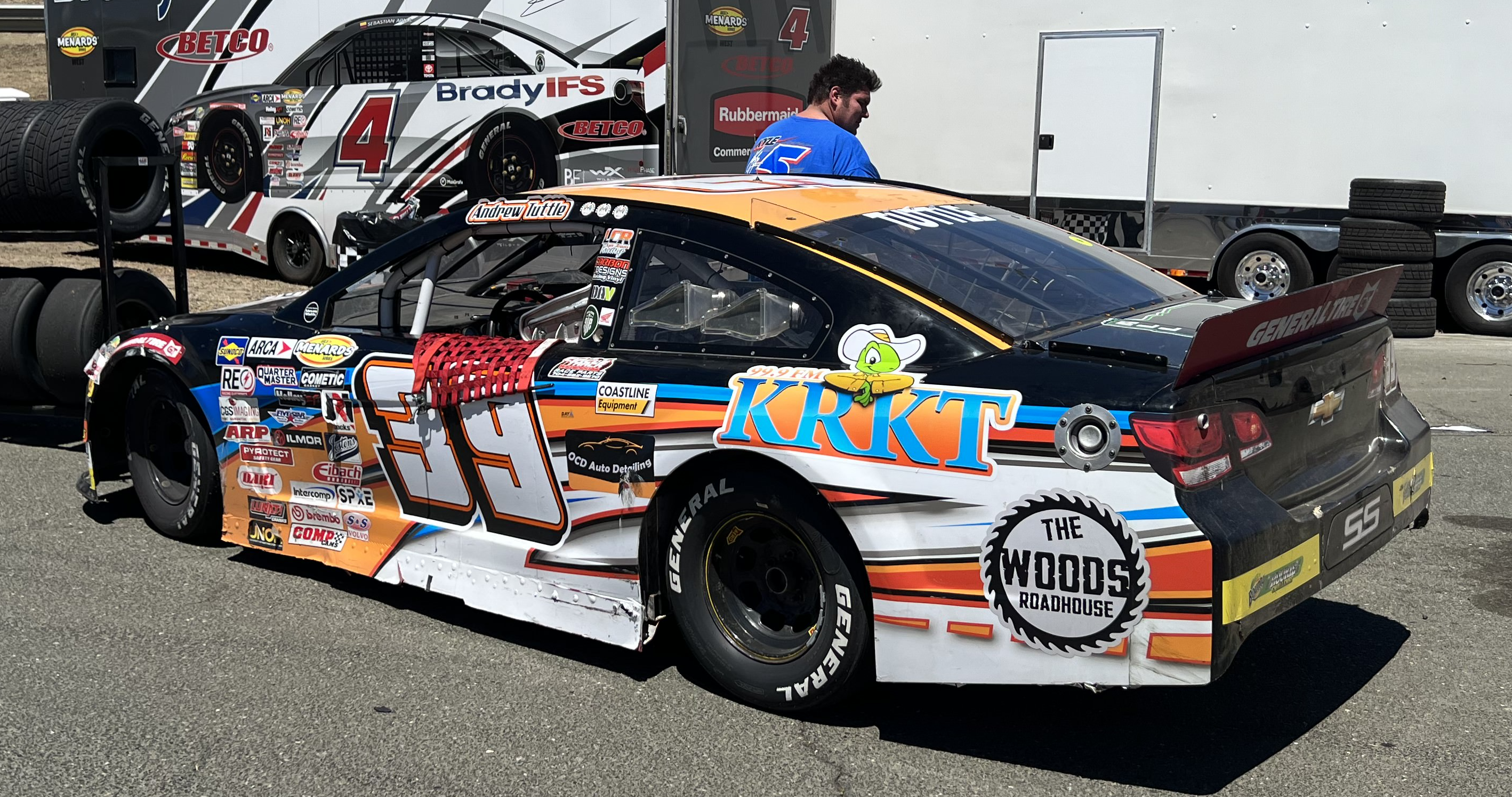
- Tuttle's No. 39 car at Sonoma Raceway in 2022
- Born: June 23, 1982 (age 44); Eagle, Idaho, U.S.

ARCA Menards Series career
- 1 race run over 1 year
- ARCA no., team: 122nd (2022)
- First race: 2022 General Tire 150 (Phoenix)
Wins	Top tens	Poles
0	0	0

ARCA Menards Series East career
- 1 race run over 1 year
- Best finish: 58th (2018)
- First race: 2018 New Smyrna 175 (New Smyrna)
Wins	Top tens	Poles
0	0	0

ARCA Menards Series West career
- 14 races run over 5 years
- Best finish: 9th (2022)
- First race: 2013 NAPA Know How 125 (Brainerd)
- Last race: 2022 NAPA Auto Parts 150 (Irwindale)
Wins	Top tens	Poles
0	0	0
- Statistics up to date as of November 19, 2022.

Andrew Tuttle (born June 23, 1982) is an American professional stock car racing driver. He last competed full-time in the ARCA Menards Series West, driving the No. 39 Ford Fusion for his family-owned team Last Chance Racing.

== Racing career ==
=== ARCA Menards Series West ===
Tuttle made his ARCA Menards Series debut in 2013 (then the NASCAR K&N Pro Series West) at Brainerd International Raceway. He finished fifteenth. He ran two other races at Lebanon I-44 Speedway and All-American Speedway, failing to finish either of those races. Tuttle ran two races in 2017 at Spokane County Raceway and Orange Show Speedway, finishing seventeenth and 21st. In 2018, Tuttle ran one race at Kern County Raceway Park, finishing nineteenth. Tuttle returned in 2021 for one race at All-American Speedway. He finished sixteenth.

== Motorsports career results ==
=== ARCA Menards Series ===
(key) (Bold – Pole position awarded by qualifying time. Italics – Pole position earned by points standings or practice time. * – Most laps led.)

ARCA Menards Series results
Year	Team	No.	Make	1	2	3	4	5	6	7	8	9	10	11	12	13	14	15	16	17	18	19	20	AMSC	Pts	Ref
2022	Last Chance Racing	39	Chevy	DAY	PHO; 35	TAL	KAN	CLT	IOW	BLN	ELK	MOH	POC	IRP	MCH	GLN	ISF	MLW	DSF	KAN	BRI	SLM	TOL	122nd	9	

==== ARCA Menards Series East ====
ARCA Menards Series East results
Year	Team	No.	Make	1	2	3	4	5	6	7	8	9	10	11	12	13	14	AMSEC	Pts	Ref
2018	Kart Idaho Racing	39	Toyota	NSM; 23	BRI	LGY	SBO	SBO	MEM	NJM	THO	NHA	IOW	GLN	GTW	NHA	DOV	58th	21	
2022	Last Chance Racing	14	Ford	NSM; Wth	FIF	DOV	NSV	IOW	MLW	BRI								-*	-*	

==== ARCA Menards Series West ====
ARCA Menards Series West results
Year	Team	No.	Make	1	2	3	4	5	6	7	8	9	10	11	12	13	14	15	AMSWC	Pts	Ref
2013	Bob Wood	14	Ford	PHO	S99	BIR; 15	IOW												34th	79	
2013	Kart Idaho Racing	38	Toyota					L44; 15	SON	CNS	IOW	EVG	SPO	MMP	SMP				34th	79	
2013	Dwayne Koski	52	Ford													AAS; 23	KCR	PHO	34th	79	
2017	Kevin McCarty	39	Toyota	TUS	KCR	IRW	IRW	SPO; 17	OSS; 21	CNS	SON	IOW	EVG	DCS	MER	AAS	KCR		34th	50	
2018	Kevin McCarty	39	Chevy	KCR; 19	TUS	TUS	OSS	CNS	SON	DCS	IOW	EVG	GTW	LVS	MER	AAS	KCR		56th	25	
2021	Kart Idaho Racing	11	Chevy	PHO	SON	IRW	CNS	IRW	PIR	LVS	AAS; 16								56th	28	
2021	Kart Idaho Racing	11	Ford									PHO; Wth							56th	28	
2022	Last Chance Racing	39	Chevy	PHO; 35	IRW; Wth	KCR; 15	PIR; 12	SON; 13	IRW; 14	EVG; 11	PIR; 13	AAS; 22	LVS; 26	PHO					9th	285	
