= 2022 General Tire 200 (Sonoma) =

Race details
- Race 5 of 11 in the 2022 ARCA Menards Series West season
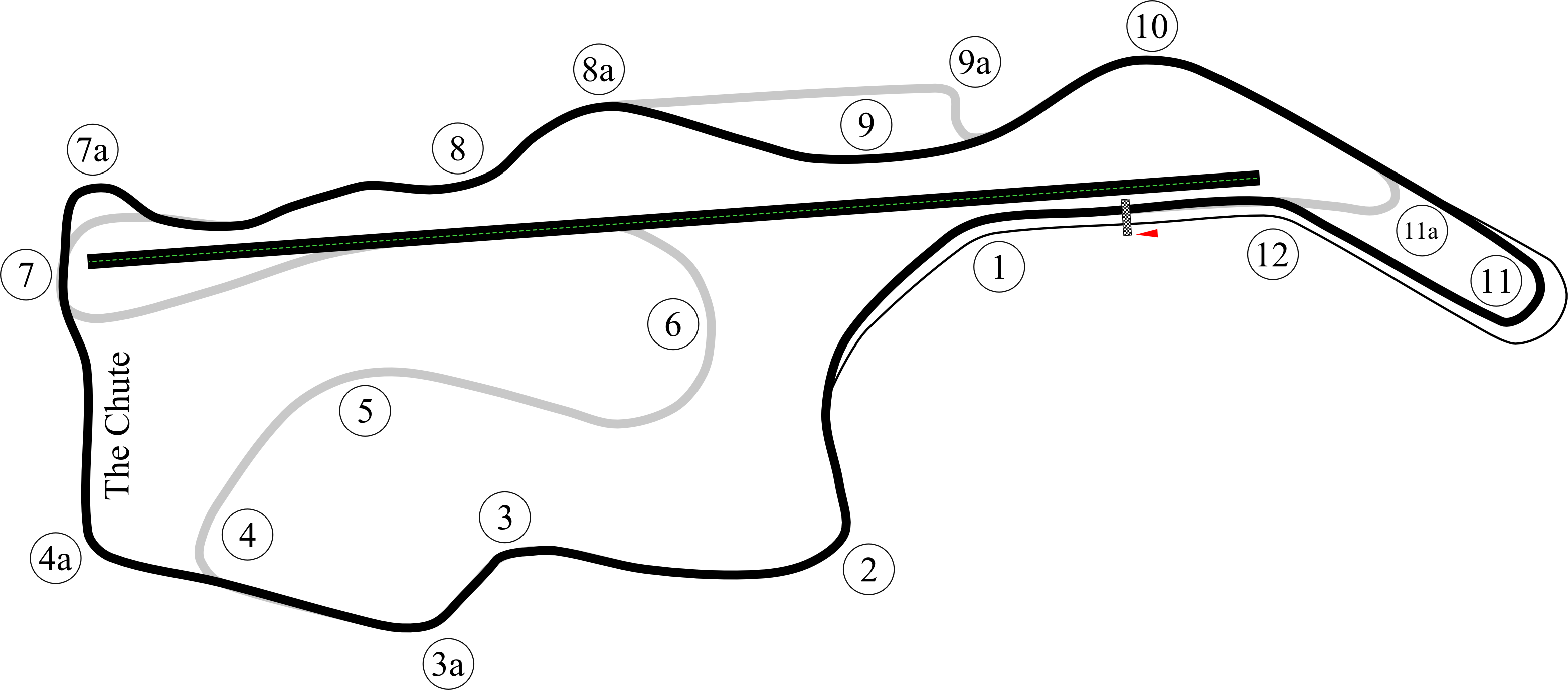
- Date: June 11, 2022
- Location: Sonoma Raceway in Sonoma, California
- Course: Permanent racing facility
- Course length: 1.99 miles (3.203 km)
- Distance: 56 laps, 111.44 mi (179.35 km)
- Average speed: 59.896 mph

Pole position
Driver	Jake Drew	Sunrise Ford Racing
- Time: 1:20.397

Most laps led
Driver	Jake Drew	Sunrise Ford Racing
- Laps: 48

Winner
No. 6	Jake Drew	Sunrise Ford Racing

The 2022 General Tire 200 was an ARCA Menards Series West race that was held on June 11, 2022, at the Sonoma Raceway in Sonoma, California. It was contested over 56 laps on the 1.99-mile (3.20 km) road course, shortened from its original 64 lap distance due to time constraints. It was the fifth race of the 2022 ARCA Menards Series West season.

== Background ==
=== Entry list ===
- (R) denotes rookie driver.
- (i) denotes driver who is ineligible for series driver points.

No.	Driver	Team	Manufacturer
4	Sebastian Arias	Nascimento Motorsports	Toyota
04	Eric Nascimento	Nascimento Motorsports	Toyota
6	Jake Drew	Sunrise Ford Racing	Ford
7	Takuma Koga	Jerry Pitts Racing	Toyota
9	Tanner Reif	Sunrise Ford Racing	Ford
13	Todd Souza	Central Coast Racing	Ford
16	Austin Herzog	Bill McAnally Racing	Chevrolet
17	Landen Lewis	McGowan Motorsports	Chevrolet
21	Jack Wood	GMS Racing	Chevrolet
31	Paul Pedroncelli	Pedroncelli Motorsports	Chevrolet
32	Dale Quarterley	1/4 Ley Racing	Chevrolet
33	P. J. Pedroncelli	Pedroncelli Motorsports	Chevrolet
39	Andrew Tuttle	Last Chance Racing	Toyota
40	Dean Thompson	Niece Motorsports	Chevrolet
52	Ryan Philpott	Philpott Race Cars	Toyota
54	Joey Iest	Naake-Klauer Motorsports	Ford
68	Rodd Kneeland	Rodd Racing	Chevrolet
77	Nick Joanides	Performance P-1 Motorsports	Toyota
80	Brian Kamisky	Brian Kamisky Racing	Chevrolet
85	Vince Little	Last Chance Racing	Chevrolet
86	Tim Spurgeon	Spurgeon Motorsports	Chevrolet
88	Bridget Burgess	BMI Racing	Chevrolet
91	Colby Howard	Bill McAnally Racing	Chevrolet
99	Cole Moore	Bill McAnally Racing	Chevrolet
Official entry list

== Practice/Qualifying ==
=== Starting Lineups ===
Pos	No	Driver	Team	Manufacturer	Time	Speed
1	6	Jake Drew	Sunrise Ford Racing	Ford	1:20.397	89.108
2	17	Landen Lewis	McGowan Motorsports	Chevrolet	1:21.134	88.298
3	32	Dale Quarterley	1/4 Ley Racing	Chevrolet	1:21.414	87.995
4	13	Todd Souza	Central Coast Racing	Ford	1:21.569	87.827
5	16	Austin Herzog	Bill McAnally Racing	Chevrolet	1:22.124	87.234
6	9	Tanner Reif	Sunrise Ford Racing	Ford	1:22.282	87.066
7	21	Jack Wood	GMS Racing	Chevrolet	1:22.466	86.872
8	33	P. J. Pedroncelli	Pedroncelli Motorsports	Chevrolet	1:22.544	86.79
9	04	Eric Nascimento	Nascimento Motorsports	Toyota	1:22.877	86.441
10	54	Joey Iest	Naake-Klauer Motorsports	Ford	1:23.096	86.214
11	91	Colby Howard	Bill McAnally Racing	Chevrolet	1:23.531	85.765
12	40	Dean Thompson	Niece Motorsports	Chevrolet	1:23.882	85.406
13	4	Sebastian Arias	Nascimento Motorsports	Toyota	1:23.935	85.352
14	80	Brian Kamisky	Brian Kamisky Racing	Chevrolet	1:24.233	85.05
15	86	Tim Spurgeon	Spurgeon Motorsports	Chevrolet	1:24.378	84.904
16	99	Cole Moore	Bill McAnally Racing	Chevrolet	1:24.565	84.716
17	52	Ryan Philpott	Philpott Race Cars	Toyota	1:24.701	84.58
18	88	Bridget Burgess	BMI Racing	Chevrolet	1:25.123	84.161
19	7	Takuma Koga	Jerry Pitts Racing	Toyota	1:25.806	83.491
20	68	Rodd Kneeland	Rodd Racing	Chevrolet	1:26.389	82.927
21	85	Vince Little	Last Chance Racing	Chevrolet	1:34.422	75.872
22	39	Andrew Tuttle	Last Chance Racing	Chevrolet	1:39.101	72.29
23	77	Nick Joanides	Performance P-1 Motorsports	Toyota	12:15.459	9.741
24	31	Paul Pedroncelli	Pedroncelli Motorsports	Chevrolet	0.00	0.00
Official qualifying results

== Race ==
=== Race results ===
Pos	Grid	No	Driver	Team	Manufacturer	Laps	Points	Status
1	1	6	Jake Drew	Sunrise Ford Racing	Ford	56	49	Running
2	11	91	Colby Howard	Bill McAnally Racing	Chevrolet	56	42	Running
3	3	32	Dale Quarterley	1/4 Ley Racing	Chevrolet	56	41	Running
4	7	21	Jack Wood	GMS Racing	Chevrolet	56	40	Running
5	10	54	Joey Iest	Naake-Klauer Motorsports	Ford	56	39	Running
6	5	16	Austin Herzog	Bill McAnally Racing	Chevrolet	56	38	Running
7	9	04	Eric Nascimento	Nascimento Motorsports	Toyota	56	37	Running
8	4	13	Todd Souza	Central Coast Racing	Ford	56	36	Running
9	15	86	Tim Spurgeon	Spurgeon Motorsports	Chevrolet	56	35	Running
10	18	88	Bridget Burgess	BMI Racing	Chevrolet	56	34	Running
11	21	85	Vince Little	Last Chance Racing	Chevrolet	56	33	Running
12	16	99	Cole Moore	Bill McAnally Racing	Chevrolet	56	32	Running
13	22	39	Andrew Tuttle	Last Chance Racing	Chevrolet	56	31	Running
14	2	17	Landen Lewis	McGowan Motorsports	Chevrolet	56	30	Running
15	12	40	Dean Thompson	Niece Motorsports	Chevrolet	50	29	Accident
16	8	33	P. J. Pedroncelli	Pedroncelli Motorsports	Chevrolet	50	28	Accident
17	17	52	Ryan Philpott	Philpott Race Cars	Toyota	50	27	Accident
18	6	9	Tanner Reif	Sunrise Ford Racing	Ford	29	26	Accident
19	19	7	Takuma Koga	Jerry Pitts Racing	Toyota	29	25	Accident
20	20	68	Rodd Kneeland	Rodd Racing	Chevrolet	22	24	Accident
21	13	4	Sebastian Arias	Nascimento Motorsports	Toyota	22	23	Accident
22	23	77	Nick Joanides	Performance P-1 Motorsports	Toyota	8	22	Mechanical
23	24	31	Paul Pedroncelli	Pedroncelli Motorsports	Chevrolet	2	21	Brakes
24	14	80	Brian Kamisky	Brian Kamisky Racing	Chevrolet	0	20	Did Not Start
Official race results

Previous race: 2022 Portland 112	ARCA Menards Series West; 2022 season	Next race: 2022 NAPA Auto Parts 150 (July race)
