= 2022 Portland 112 =

Race details
- Race 4 of 11 in the 2022 ARCA Menards Series West season
- Date: June 4, 2022
- Location: Portland International Raceway in Portland, Oregon
- Course: Permanent racing facility
- Course length: 1.97 miles (3.19 km)
- Distance: 57 laps, 112.29 mi (180.71 km)
- Average speed: 57.194

Pole position
Driver	Daniel Dye	GMS Racing
- Time: 01:37.10

Most laps led
Driver	Jake Drew	Sunrise Ford Racing
- Laps: 31

Winner
No. 6	Jake Drew	Sunrise Ford Racing

The 2022 Portland 112 was an ARCA Menards Series West race that was held on June 4, 2022, at the Portland International Raceway in Portland, Oregon. It was contested over 57 laps on the 1.97-mile (3.17 km) road course. It was the fourth race of the 2022 ARCA Menards Series West season. Sunrise Ford Racing driver Jake Drew collected his first career West Series victory.

== Background ==
=== Entry list ===
- (R) denotes rookie driver.
- (i) denotes driver who is ineligible for series driver points.

No.	Driver	Team	Manufacturer	Sponsor
4	Eric Nascimento	Nascimento Motorsports	Toyota	RJ's Paint Shop, Impact Transport, Skipco
6	Jake Drew	Sunrise Ford Racing	Ford	Irwindale Speedway, Stilo USA-Offset Sport
7	Takuma Koga	Jerry Pitts Racing	Toyota	Loop Connect
9	Tanner Reif	Sunrise Ford Racing	Ford	Vegas Fastener Manufacturing
13	Todd Souza	Central Coast Racing	Ford	Central Coast Cabinets
16	Austin Herzog	Bill McAnally Racing	Chevrolet	NAPA Auto Parts
17	Connor Mosack	McGowan Motorsports	Chevrolet	High Point University
31	Paul Pedroncelli	Pedroncelli Motorsports	Chevrolet	Rancho Victoria Weddings
32	Dale Quarterley	1/4 Ley Racing	Chevrolet	Van Dyk Recycling Solutions, Motul
33	P. J. Pedroncelli	Pedroncelli Motorsports	Chevrolet	Select Mobile Bottlers
39	Andrew Tuttle	Last Chance Racing	Toyota	Gearhead Coffee
43	Daniel Dye	GMS Racing	Chevrolet	Deland Motorsports & Outdoors
54	Joey Iest	Naake-Klauer Motorsports	Ford	Richwood Meats, Basila Farms
85	Vince Little	Last Chance Racing	Chevrolet	True Quality Construction, Herzog Roofing
88	Bridget Burgess	BMI Racing	Chevrolet	HMH Construction
99	Cole Moore	Bill McAnally Racing	Chevrolet	Adaptive One
Official entry list

== Practice/Qualifying ==
=== Starting Lineups ===
Pos	No	Driver	Team	Manufacturer	Time	Speed
1	43	Daniel Dye	GMS Racing	Chevrolet	01:37.10	73.009
2	6	Jake Drew	Sunrise Ford Racing	Ford	01:37.80	72.551
3	17	Connor Mosack	McGowan Motorsports	Chevrolet	01:39.20	71.483
4	9	Tanner Reif	Sunrise Ford Racing	Ford	01:40.00	70.894
5	13	Todd Souza	Central Coast Racing	Ford	01:41.10	70.124
6	7	Takuma Koga	Jerry Pitts Racing	Toyota	01:41.90	69.631
7	33	P. J. Pedroncelli	Pedroncelli Motorsports	Toyota	01:42.00	69.554
8	88	Bridget Burgess	BMI Racing	Chevrolet	01:42.00	69.499
9	4	Eric Nascimento	Nascimento Motorsports	Toyota	01:42.10	69.463
10	16	Austin Herzog	Bill McAnally Racing	Chevrolet	01:43.00	68.86
11	54	Joey Iest	Naake-Klauer Motorsports	Ford	01:43.10	68.797
12	99	Cole Moore	Bill McAnally Racing	Chevrolet	01:45.00	67.534
13	85	Vince Little	Last Chance Racing	Chevrolet	01:46.30	66.731
14	32	Dale Quarterley	1/4 Ley Racing	Chevrolet	01:49.30	64.906
15	31	Paul Pedroncelli	Pedroncelli Motorsports	Chevrolet	0.000	0.000
16	39	Andrew Tuttle	Last Chance Racing	Chevrolet	0.000	0.000
Official qualifying results

== Race ==
=== Race results ===
Pos	Grid	No	Driver	Team	Manufacturer	Laps	Points	Status
1	2	6	Jake Drew	Sunrise Ford Racing	Ford	42	48	running
2	3	17	Connor Mosack	McGowan Motorsports	Chevrolet	42	43	running
3	5	13	Todd Souza	Central Coast Racing	Ford	42	42	running
4	1	43	Daniel Dye	GMS Racing	Chevrolet	42	41	running
5	6	7	Takuma Koga	Jerry Pitts Racing	Toyota	42	39	running
6	4	9	Tanner Reif	Sunrise Ford Racing	Ford	42	39	running
7	8	88	Bridget Burgess	BMI Racing	Chevrolet	42	37	running
8	7	33	P. J. Pedroncelli	Pedroncelli Motorsports	Chevrolet	41	36	running
9	10	16	Austin Herzog	Bill McAnally Racing	Toyota	40	35	running
10	11	54	Joey Iest	Naake-Klauer Motorsports	Ford	40	34	running
11	12	99	Cole Moore	Bill McAnally Racing	Chevrolet	40	33	running
12	16	39	Andrew Tuttle	Last Chance Racing	Chevrolet	36	32	running
13	9	4	Eric Nascimento	Nascimento Motorsports	Toyota	36	31	running
14	13	85	Vince Little	Last Chance Racing	Chevrolet	36	30	running
15	14	32	Dale Quarterley	1/4 Ley Racing	Chevrolet	1	29	electrical
16	15	31	Paul Pedroncelli	Pedroncelli Motorsports	Chevrolet	1	28	brakes
Official race results

Previous race: 2022 Salute to the Oil Industry NAPA Auto Parts 150	ARCA Menards Series West; 2022 season	Next race: 2022 General Tire 200
