= 2022 NAPA Auto Parts 150 (July race) =

2022 NAPA Auto Parts 150 presented by the West Coast Stock Car Hall of Fame
Race details
- Race 6 of 11 in the 2022 ARCA Menards Series West season
- Date: July 2, 2022
- Location: Irwindale Speedway in Irwindale, California
- Course: Permanent racing facility
- Course length: 0.50 miles (0.80 km)
- Distance: 153 laps, 75.50 mi (123.165 km)
- Average speed: 65.578

Pole position
Driver	Jake Drew	Sunrise Ford Racing
- Time: 18.597

Most laps led
Driver	Jake Drew	Sunrise Ford Racing
- Laps: 154

Winner
No. 6	Jake Drew	Sunrise Ford Racing

The 2022 NAPA Auto Parts 150 was an ARCA Menards Series West race that was held on July 2, 2022, at the Irwindale Speedway in Irwindale, California. It was contested over 154 laps on the 0.50-mile (0.80 km) oval due to an overtime finish. It was the sixth race of the 2022 ARCA Menards Series West season. Jake Drew led every lap en route to a dominating third-consecutive victory.

== Background ==
=== Entry list ===
- (R) denotes rookie driver.
- (i) denotes driver who is ineligible for series driver points.

No.	Driver	Team	Manufacturer
1	Jake Finch	Phoenix Racing	Toyota
4	Sebastian Arias	Nascimento Motorsports	Toyota
6	Jake Drew	Sunrise Ford Racing	Ford
7	Takuma Koga	Jerry Pitts Racing	Toyota
9	Tanner Reif	Sunrise Ford Racing	Ford
11	Chris Lowden	Lowden Motorsports	Chevrolet
12	Kyle Keller	Jerry Pitts Racing	Ford
13	Todd Souza	Central Coast Racing	Ford
16	Landen Lewis	Bill McAnally Racing	Chevrolet
17	Amber Slagle	McGowan Motorsports	Chevrolet
31	Paul Pedroncelli	Pedroncelli Motorsports	Chevrolet
33	P. J. Pedroncelli	Pedroncelli Motorsports	Chevrolet
39	Andrew Tuttle	Last Chance Racing	Chevrolet
42	Christian Rose	Cook-Finley Racing	Toyota
50	Trevor Huddleston	Huddleston Racing	Ford
54	Joey Iest	Naake-Klauer Motorsports	Ford
66	Eric Rhead	66 Rhead Racing	Chevrolet
77	Nick Joanides	Performance P-1 Motorsports	Toyota
84	Bradley Erickson	Naake-Klauer Motorsports	Ford
88	Bridget Burgess	BMI Racing	Chevrolet
99	Cole Moore	Bill McAnally Racing	Chevrolet
Official entry list

== Practice/Qualifying ==
=== Starting Lineups ===
Pos	No	Driver	Team	Manufacturer	Time	Speed
1	6	Jake Drew	Sunrise Ford Racing	Ford	18.597	96.79
2	33	P. J. Pedroncelli	Pedroncelli Motorsports	Toyota	18.635	96.592
3	99	Cole Moore	Bill McAnally Racing	Chevrolet	18.648	96.525
4	4	Sebastian Arias	Nascimento Motorsports	Toyota	18.649	96.52
5	50	Trevor Huddleston	Huddleston Racing	Ford	18.661	96.458
6	9	Tanner Reif	Sunrise Ford Racing	Ford	18.724	96.133
7	1	Jake Finch	Phoenix Racing	Toyota	18.776	95.867
8	13	Todd Souza	Central Coast Racing	Ford	18.904	95.218
9	7	Takuma Koga	Jerry Pitts Racing	Toyota	18.908	95.198
10	12	Kyle Keller	Jerry Pitts Racing	Ford	18.915	95.163
11	84	Bradley Erickson	Naake-Klauer Motorsports	Ford	18.968	94.897
12	54	Joey Iest	Naake-Klauer Motorsports	Ford	18.989	94.792
13	16	Landen Lewis	Bill McAnally Racing	Chevrolet	18.99	94.787
14	42	Christian Rose	Cook-Finley Racing	Toyota	19.161	93.941
15	17	Amber Slagle	Steve McGowan Motorsports	Chevrolet	19.205	93.726
16	77	Nick Joanides	Performance P-1 Motorsports	Toyota	19.284	93.342
17	88	Bridget Burgess	BMI Racing	Chevrolet	19.47	92.45
18	11	Chris Lowden	Lowden Motorsports	Chevrolet	19.84	90.726
19	66	Eric Rhead	66 Rhead Racing	Chevrolet	19.862	90.625
20	39	Andrew Tuttle	Last Chance Racing	Chevrolet	20.125	89.441
21	31	Paul Pedroncelli	Pedroncelli Motorsports	Chevrolet	0.000	0.000
Official practice/qualifying results

== Race ==
=== Race results ===
Pos	Grid	No	Driver	Team	Manufacturer	Laps	Points	Status
1	1	6	Jake Drew	Sunrise Ford Racing	Ford	154	49	Running
2	3	99	Cole Moore	Bill McAnally Racing	Chevrolet	154	42	Running
3	5	50	Trevor Huddleston	Huddleston Racing	Ford	154	41	Running
4	10	12	Kyle Keller	Jerry Pitts Racing	Ford	154	40	Running
5	13	16	Landen Lewis	Bill McAnally Racing	Chevrolet	154	39	Running
6	7	1	Jake Finch	Phoenix Racing	Toyota	154	38	Running
7	6	9	Tanner Reif	Sunrise Ford Racing	Ford	154	37	Running
8	4	4	Sebastian Arias	Nascimento Motorsports	Toyota	154	36	Running
9	15	17	Amber Slagle	Steve McGowan Motorsports	Chevrolet	154	35	Running
10	8	13	Todd Souza	Central Coast Racing	Ford	152	34	Running
11	2	33	P. J. Pedroncelli	Pedroncelli Motorsports	Toyota	150	33	Running
12	18	11	Chris Lowden	Lowden Motorsports	Chevrolet	149	32	Running
13	12	54	Joey Iest	Naake-Klauer Motorsports	Ford	145	31	Crash
14	20	39	Andrew Tuttle	Last Chance Racing	Chevrolet	145	30	Running
15	19	66	Eric Rhead	66 Rhead Racing	Chevrolet	141	29	Crash
16	14	42	Christian Rose	Cook-Finley Racing	Toyota	119	28	Crash
17	16	77	Nick Joanides	Performance P-1 Motorsports	Toyota	117	27	Crash
18	9	7	Takuma Koga	Jerry Pitts Racing	Toyota	112	26	Crash
19	17	88	Bridget Burgess	BMI Racing	Chevrolet	63	25	Steering
20	11	84	Bradley Erickson	Naake-Klauer Motorsports	Ford	19	24	Rear end
21	21	31	Paul Pedroncelli	Pedroncelli Motorsports	Chevrolet	2	23	Transmission
Official race results

Previous race: 2022 General Tire 200	ARCA Menards Series West; 2022 season	Next race: 2022 NAPA Auto Parts ARCA West 150
