= Katie Hettinger =

American stock car racing driver

- Born: June 25, 2007 (age 19); Dryden, Michigan, U.S.
- Achievements: 2020 CRA Junior Late Model Series Champion; 2023 Fall Brawl Winner (PLM)
- Awards: 2023 CARS Pro Late Model Tour Rookie of the Year

ARCA Menards Series West career
- 2 races run over 1 year
- Best finish: 32nd (2022)
- First race: 2022 Star Nursery 150 (Las Vegas)
- Last race: 2022 Desert Diamond Casino West Valley 100 (Phoenix)
| Wins | Top tens | Poles |
|---|---|---|
| 0 | 0 | 0 |
- Statistics up to date as of October 23, 2024.

Katie Hettinger (born June 25, 2007) is an American professional stock car racing driver. She competed in the CARS Tour from 2021 to 2024, however recently stepped away to focus on her high school education.

== Racing career ==
=== Early career ===
At the age of five, Hettinger started racing quarter midgets locally, working up to regionally and then nationally. She collected over forty wins from USAC .25, Midwest Thunder, and the Quarter Midgets of America. From the age of nine to eleven, she transitioned to dirt junior sprints and micro sprints.

=== Transition to asphalt ===
In 2019, at the age of twelve, Hettinger moved to full-body stock cars in the Champion Racing Association Junior Late Model Series. She would finish fourth and grab the Sportsman of the Year award. The following year, she would grab two wins and three fast-time awards, as well as the series championship, becoming the only female to win the championship.

At the age of fourteen, Hettinger joined the highest levels of local late model racing in the NASCAR Weekly Racing Series with Matt Piercy Racing. In 2021, she won the 50-lap Limited Late Model Feature as part of the Bobby Isaac memorial event. Two weeks later, she became the youngest female Late Model winner at Hickory Speedway.

In 2022, Hettinger competed in the Carolina Pro Late Model Series, the CARS Pro Late Model Tour and select Pro Late Model events. She would also debut in the ARCA Menards Series West division of NASCAR driving for Young's Motorsports.

From 2023 to 2024, Hettinger continued driving in the Carolina Pro Late Model Series, becoming the first female to win in the series. In 2024, she announced that she would be stepping away to focus on her education, but showed interest in returning.

== Personal life ==
Hettinger is the daughter of Chris Hettinger, who is the owner of Hettinger Racing.

Hettinger is a third-generation racer from Dryden, Michigan.

== Motorsports results ==
=== ARCA Menards Series West ===
(key) (Bold – Pole position awarded by qualifying time. Italics – Pole position earned by points standings or practice time. * – Most laps led.)

| Year | Team | No. | Make | 1 | 2 | 3 | 4 | 5 | 6 | 7 | 8 | 9 | 10 | 11 | AMSWC | Pts | Ref |
|---|---|---|---|---|---|---|---|---|---|---|---|---|---|---|---|---|---|
| 2022 | Young's Motorsports | 02 | Chevy | PHO | IRW | KCR | PIR | SON | IRW | EVG | PIR | AAS | LVS; 23 | PHO; 19 | 32nd | 96 | |

=== CARS Late Model Stock Car Tour ===
(key) (Bold – Pole position awarded by qualifying time. Italics – Pole position earned by points standings or practice time. * – Most laps led. ** – All laps led.)

CARS Late Model Stock Car Tour results
| Year | Team | No. | Make | 1 | 2 | 3 | 4 | 5 | 6 | 7 | 8 | 9 | 10 | 11 | 12 | 13 | 14 | 15 | 16 | 17 | CLMSCTC | Pts | Ref |
|---|---|---|---|---|---|---|---|---|---|---|---|---|---|---|---|---|---|---|---|---|---|---|---|
| 2022 | N/A | 1 | Chevy | CRW | HCY | GRE | AAS | FCS | LGY | DOM | HCY | ACE | MMS; 12 | | | | | | | | 42nd | 36 | |
| 2022 | N/A | 71 | Chevy | | | | | | | | | | | NWS; 24 | TCM | ACE | SBO; 30 | CRW | | | 42nd | 36 | |
| 2024 | Hettinger Racing | 71 | Chevy | SNM; 14 | HCY; 20 | AAS; 21 | OCS; 6 | ACE; 14 | TCM; 21 | LGY; 20 | DOM; 20 | CRW; 10 | HCY | NWS | ACE | WCS | FLC | SBO | TCM | NWS | 21st | 164 | |

=== CARS Pro Late Model Tour ===
(key)

CARS Pro Late Model Tour results
| Year | Team | No. | Make | 1 | 2 | 3 | 4 | 5 | 6 | 7 | 8 | 9 | 10 | 11 | 12 | 13 | CPLMTC | Pts | Ref |
|---|---|---|---|---|---|---|---|---|---|---|---|---|---|---|---|---|---|---|---|
| 2022 | N/A | 96K | Chevy | CRW | HCY | GPS | FCS | TCM; 13 | HCY | ACE | MMS; 2 | TCM | ACE; 4 | SBO | CRW | | 14th | 80 | |
| 2023 | Hettinger Racing | 81 | Chevy | SNM; 5 | HCY; 6 | ACE; 3 | NWS; 5 | TCM; 6 | DIL; 2 | CRW; 2 | WKS; 3 | HCY; 4 | TCM; 6 | SBO; 6 | TCM; 14* | CRW | 2nd | 335 | |
| 2024 | Hettinger Racing | 71 | Chevy | SNM; 7 | HCY; 5 | OCS; 11 | ACE; 16 | TCM | CRW | HCY | NWS | ACE | FLC | SBO | TCM | NWS | 22nd | 93 | |
| 2025 | Hettinger Racing | 71 | Chevy | AAS | CDL | OCS | ACE | NWS | CRW | HCY | HCY; 8 | AND | FLC | SBO | TCM | NWS | 52nd | 35 | |
