= Tripp Gaylord =

American racing driver (born 1991)

- Nationality: (United States) American
- Born: May 26, 1995 (age 31) Lakewood, Colorado, U.S.

ARCA Menards Series West career
- Debut season: 2022
- Current team: Performance P-1 Motorsports
- Car number: 77
- Engine: Toyota
- Crew chief: Joe Nava
- Starts: 0
- Championships: 0
- Wins: 0
- Poles: 0
- Statistics up to date as of April 23, 2022.

Tripp Gaylord (born May 26, 1995) is an American professional stock car racing driver. He last competed part-time in the ARCA Menards Series West, driving the No. 77 Toyota Camry for Performance P-1 Motorsports.

== Racing career ==
=== ARCA Menards Series West ===
Gaylord made his ARCA Menards Series West debut in 2022 in the 2022 Salute to the Oil Industry NAPA Auto Parts 150 at Kern County Raceway Park for Performance P-1 Motorsports.

== Personal life ==
Gaylord is the son of Scott Gaylord, a former driver in the NASCAR Cup Series.

== Motorsports career results ==
=== ARCA Menards Series West ===
(key) (Bold – Pole position awarded by qualifying time. Italics – Pole position earned by points standings or practice time. * – Most laps led. ** – All laps led.)

ARCA Menards Series West results
Year	Team	No.	Make	1	2	3	4	5	6	7	8	9	10	11	AMSWC	Pts	Ref
2022	Performance P-1 Motorsports	77	Toyota	PHO	IRW	KCR; 16	PIR	SON	IRW	EVG	PIR	AAS	LVS	PHO	60th	28	
