= Tanner Reif =

American racing driver (born 2005)

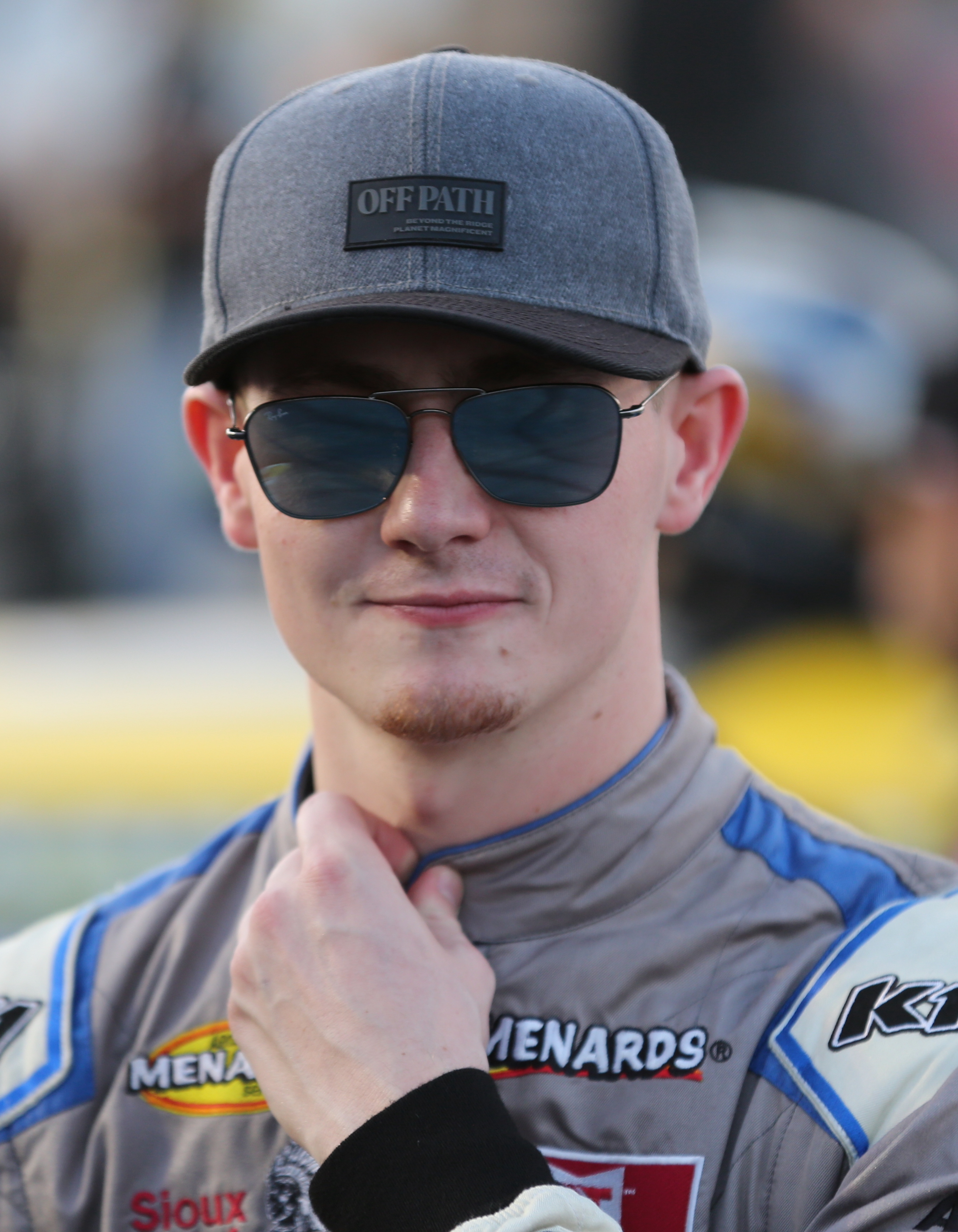
- Reif at Madera Speedway in 2025
- Born: Tanner Richard Reif; September 9, 2005 (age 21); Las Vegas, Nevada, U.S.

ARCA Menards Series career
- 6 races run over 4 years
- Best finish: 50th (2024)
- First race: 2022 General Tire 150 (Phoenix)
- Last race: 2025 General Tire 150 (Phoenix)
Wins	Top tens	Poles
0	0	0

ARCA Menards Series East career
- 2 races run over 1 year
- Best finish: 35th (2024)
- First race: 2024 General Tire 150 (Dover)
- Last race: 2024 Music City 150 (Nashville Fairgrounds)
Wins	Top tens	Poles
0	0	0

ARCA Menards Series West career
- 35 races run over 4 years
- Best finish: 2nd (2022)
- First race: 2022 General Tire 150 (Phoenix)
- Last race: 2026 NAPA Auto Parts 150 (Bakersfield)
- First win: 2022 NAPA Auto Parts 150 (Irwindale)
- Last win: 2025 ARCA Menards Series West 150 presented by the West Coast Stock Car Motorsports Hall of Fame (Tucson)
Wins	Top tens	Poles
3	25	2
- Statistics up to date as of October 11, 2025.

Tanner Richard Reif (born September 9, 2005) is an American professional stock car racing driver. He competes full-time in the Trans-Am CUBE 3 Architecture TA2 Series, driving the No. 75 Chevrolet SS for Silver Hare Racing. He has previously competed in the ARCA Menards Series, the ARCA Menards Series East, and the ARCA Menards Series West, where he finished second in the points standings in 2022.

== Racing career ==
=== Late models ===
Reif would drive full-time in the 51FIFTY Jr. Late Model Series at Madera Speedway in 2019, where he would earn several wins. That same year, he would attempt to race in the SRL Southwest Tour at the Las Vegas Motor Speedway Bullring, but would fail to qualify for it. He would return for 2020, only to drive for one race at the Irwindale Event Center. He finished 23rd due to a suspension issue.

Reif would make twelve starts in the NASCAR Advance Auto Parts Weekly Series in 2020, racing at Irwindale. He earned one win, ten top tens, and four top fives, and finished 8th in the standings. He drove at Tucson Speedway in 2021 for three races, getting one win, three top tens, and two top-fives. He won at the Las Vegas Motor Speedway Bullring later that season. He would eventually drive full time in the SRL Southwest Tour in 2021. He earned eight top tens and four top-fives in eleven races and finished fourth in the standings.

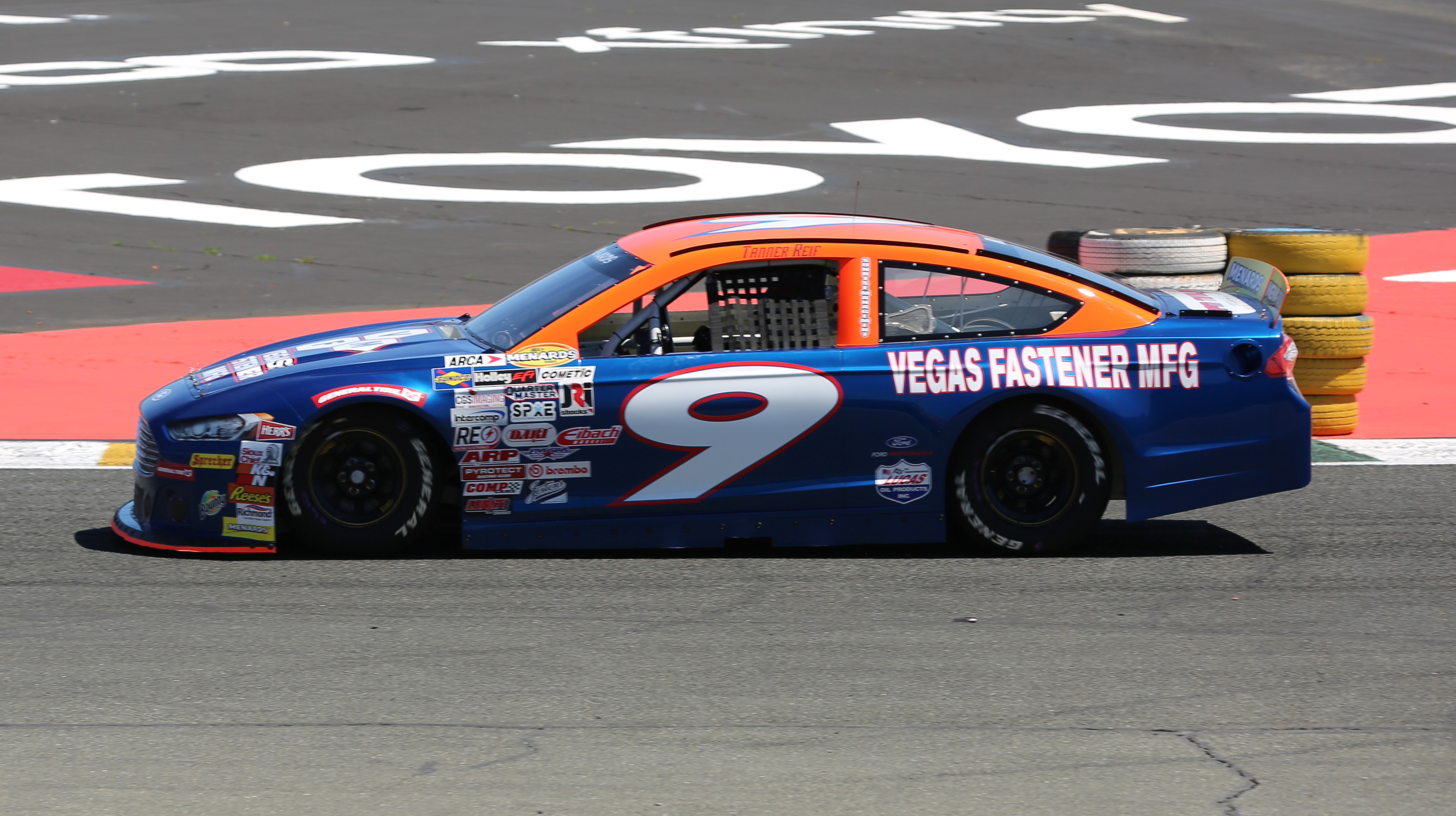
Reif at Sonoma Raceway in 2022

=== ARCA Menards Series West ===
On January 28, 2022, Reif would sign with Sunrise Ford Racing, to drive full time in the 2022 ARCA Menards Series West. He will be driving the 9 car, which was previously driven by Jake Drew in 2021. Reif would get his first career West Series win at Irwindale Speedway, after getting the pole and leading every lap. He earned his second win at Evergreen Speedway, the 1,000th ARCA West race, after passing his teammate, Jake Drew, with 23 laps to go.

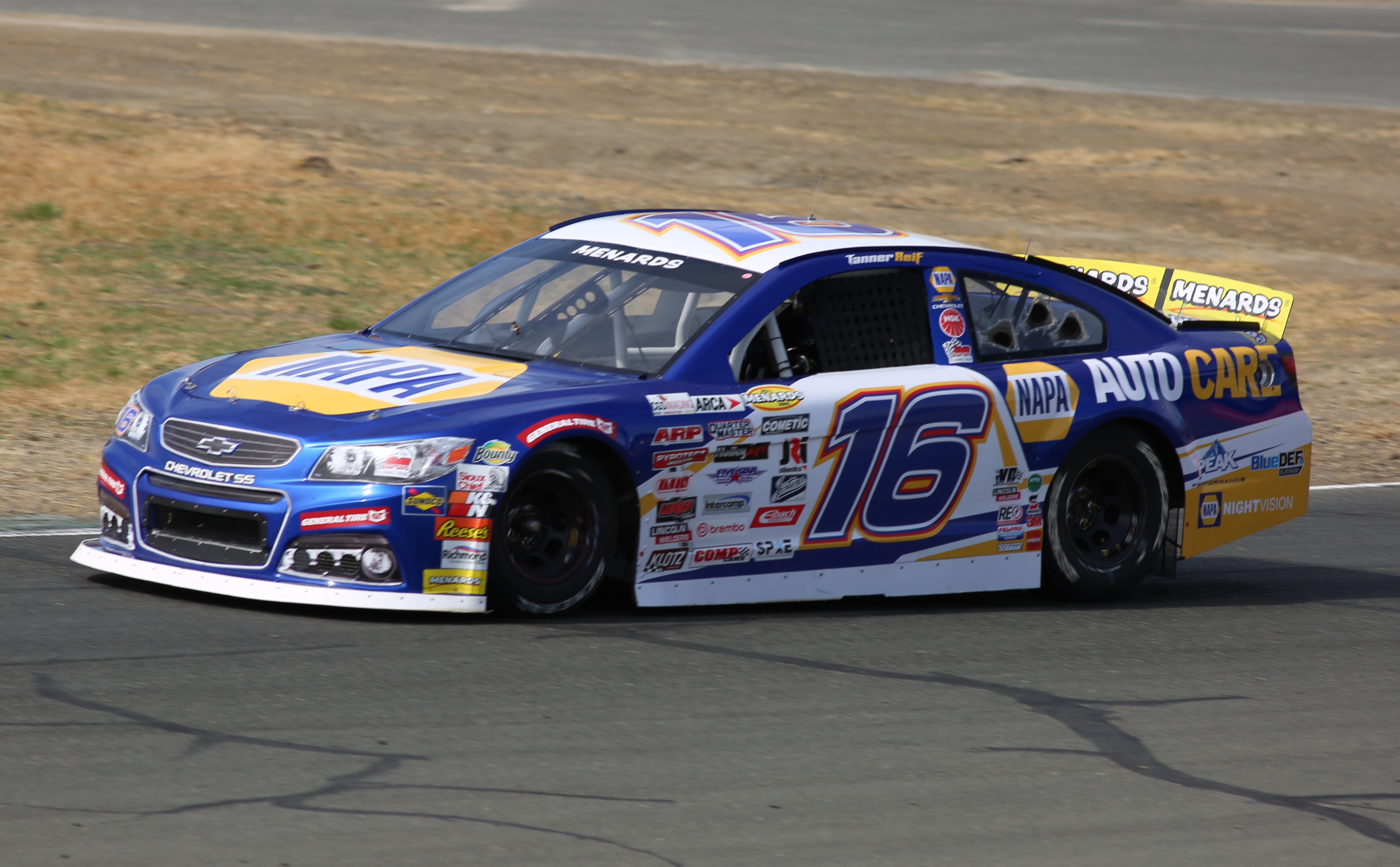
Reif's No. 16 ARCA car at Sonoma in 2023

On February 2, 2023, Bill McAnally Racing announced that Reif would drive their No. 16 car full-time in the 2023 season.

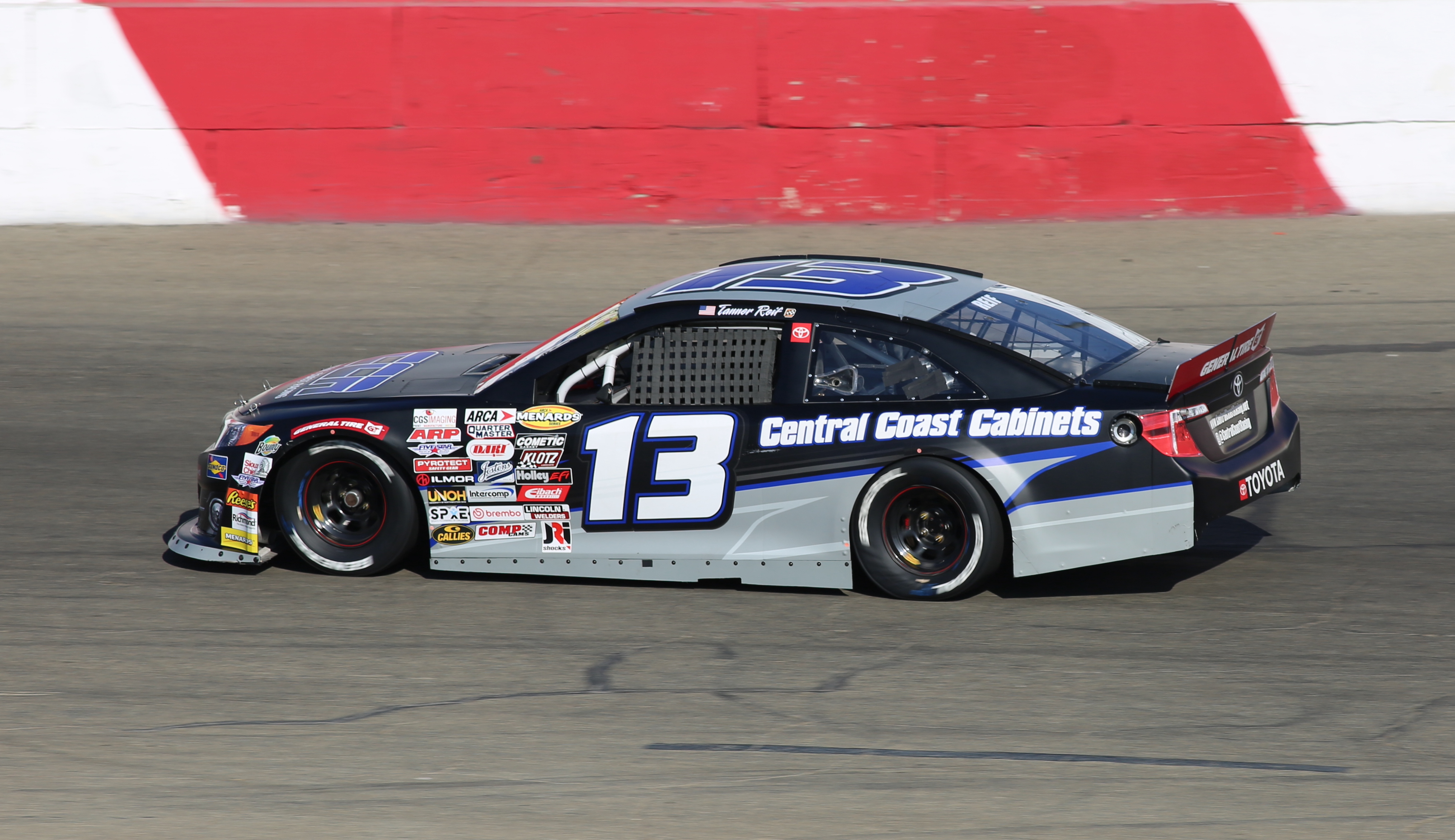
Reif's No. 13 car at All American Speedway in 2025

On January 8, 2025, Central Coast Racing announced that Reif would drive their No. 13 car full-time in the 2025 season. Reif would get his third career win at Tucson, after saving his tires late in the race.

Before the 2026 season, Reif competed in Kaulig Racing's "Race For the Seat", competing against 14 other drivers to try to win a full-season ride in the team's No. 14 truck.

=== Trans-Am Series ===
On January 20, 2026, it was announced that Reif will run full-time in the Trans-Am TA2 Series, driving the No. 75 Chevrolet for Silver Hare Racing.

== Personal life ==
Tanner's younger brother, Tyler Reif, races part-time in the NASCAR Craftsman Truck Series, driving the No. 42 Chevrolet Silverado RST for Niece Motorsports.

== Motorsports career results ==
=== ARCA Menards Series ===
(key) (Bold – Pole position awarded by qualifying time. Italics – Pole position earned by points standings or practice time. * – Most laps led. ** – All laps led.)

ARCA Menards Series results
Year	Team	No.	Make	1	2	3	4	5	6	7	8	9	10	11	12	13	14	15	16	17	18	19	20	AMSC	Pts	Ref
2022	Sunrise Ford Racing	9	Ford	DAY	PHO; 16	TAL	KAN	CLT	IOW	BLN	ELK	MOH	POC	IRP	MCH	GLN	ISF	MLW	DSF	KAN	BRI	SLM	TOL	94th	28	
2023	Bill McAnally Racing	16	Chevy	DAY	PHO; 12	TAL	KAN	CLT	BLN	ELK	MOH	IOW	POC	MCH	IRP	GLN	ISF	MLW	DSF	KAN	BRI	SLM	TOL	87th	32	
2024	Cook Racing Technologies	42	Chevy	DAY	PHO; 14	TAL	DOV; 22																	50th	78	
2024	Cook Racing Technologies	42	Toyota					KAN; 18	CLT	IOW	MOH	BLN	IRP	SLM	ELK	MCH	ISF	MLW	DSF	GLN	BRI	KAN	TOL	50th	78	
2025	Central Coast Racing	13	Toyota	DAY	PHO; 13	TAL	KAN	CLT	MCH	BLN	ELK	LRP	DOV	IRP	IOW	GLN	ISF	MAD	DSF	BRI	SLM	KAN	TOL	108th	31	

==== ARCA Menards Series East ====
ARCA Menards Series East results
Year	Team	No.	Make	1	2	3	4	5	6	7	8	AMSEC	Pts	Ref
2024	Cook Racing Technologies	42	Chevy	FIF	DOV; 22	NSV; 15	FRS	IOW	IRP	MLW	BRI	35th	51	

==== ARCA Menards Series West ====
ARCA Menards Series West results
Year	Team	No.	Make	1	2	3	4	5	6	7	8	9	10	11	12	AMSWC	Pts	Ref
2022	Sunrise Ford Racing	9	Ford	PHO; 16	**IRW**; 1**	KCR; 4	PIR; 6	SON; 18	IRW; 7	**EVG**; 1	PIR; 3	AAS; 6	LVS; 6	PHO; 10		2nd	568	
2023	Bill McAnally Racing	16	Chevy	PHO; 12	IRW; 5	KCR; 4	PIR; 14	SON; 20	IRW; 3	SHA; 7	EVG; 15	AAS; 3	LVS; 3	MAD; 17	PHO; 8	5th	567	
2024	Cook Racing Technologies	42	Chevy	PHO; 14	KER											34th	54	
2024	Naake-Klauer Motorsports	88	Ford			PIR; 20	SON; Wth	IRW	IRW	SHA	TRI	MAD	AAS	KER	PHO	34th	54	
2025	Central Coast Racing	13	Toyota	KER; 3	PHO; 13	TUC; 1	CNS; 5	KER; 4		TRI; 6		AAS; 8	MAD; 8			6th	518	
2025	Central Coast Racing	13	Ford						SON; 9		PIR; 10			LVS; 5	PHO	6th	518	
