= 2022 ARCA Menards Series West =

69th season of the ARCA Menards Series West

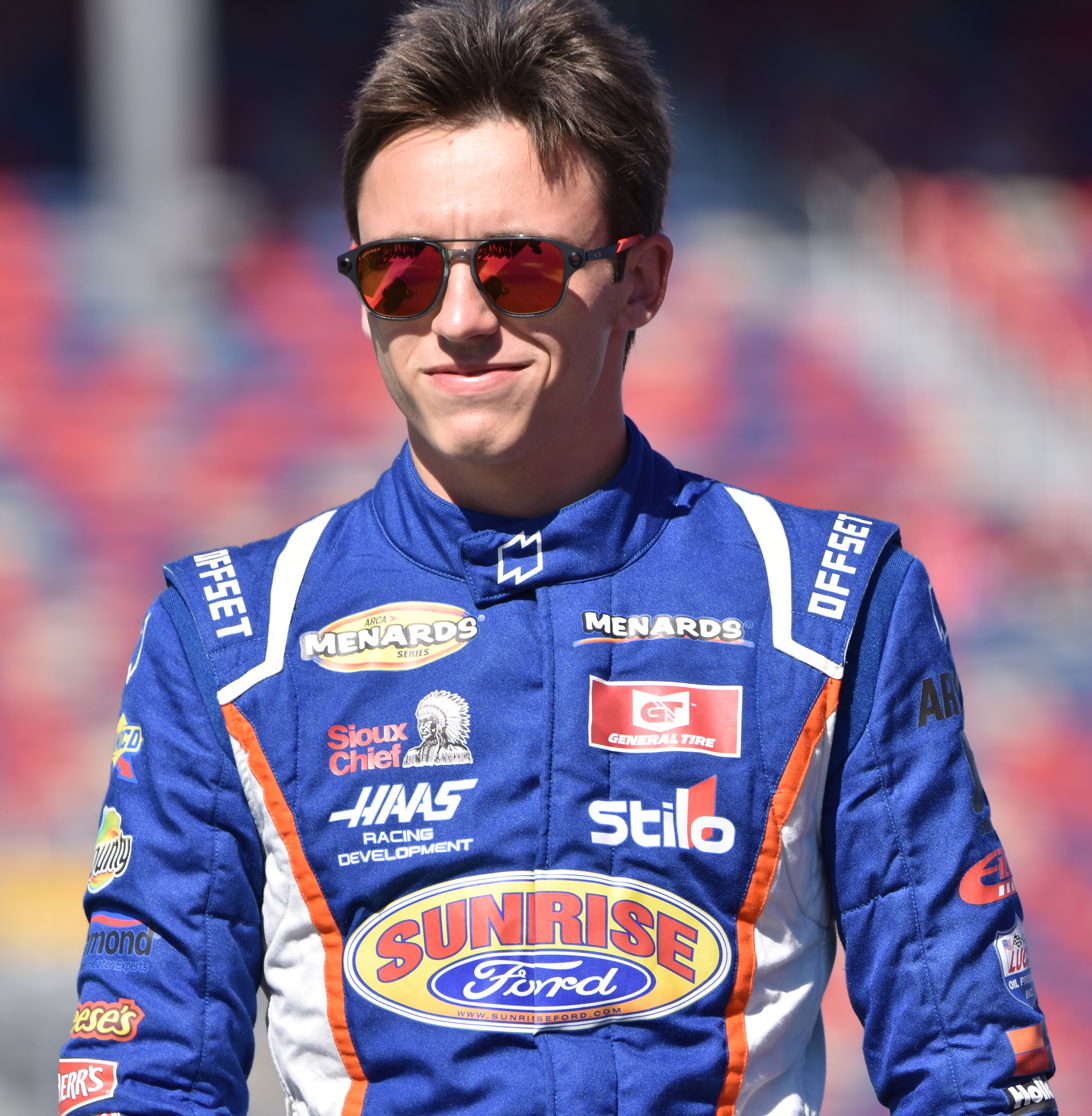
Jake Drew, the 2022 ARCA Menards Series West champion.

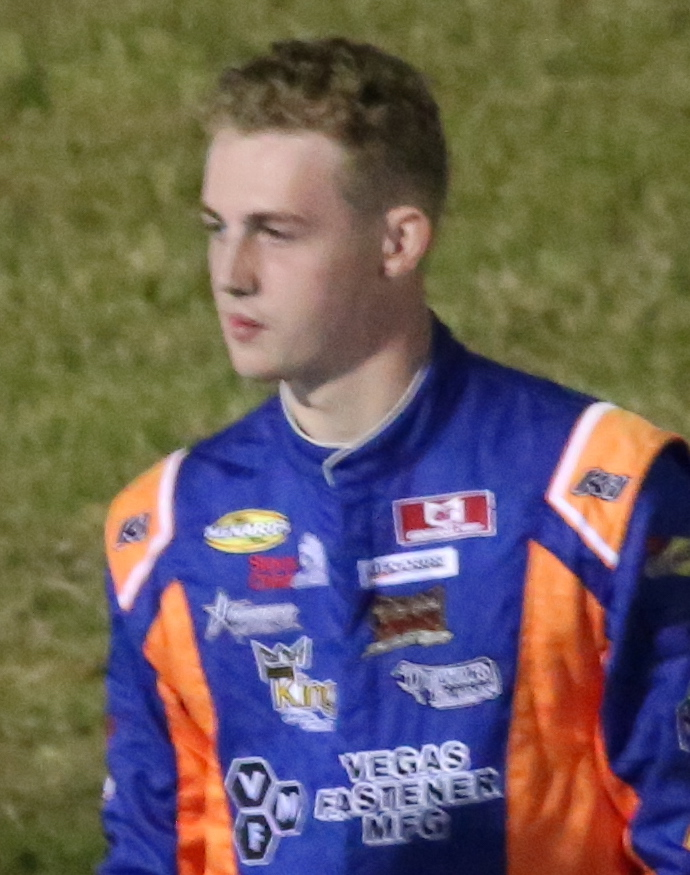
Tanner Reif finished second in the championship.

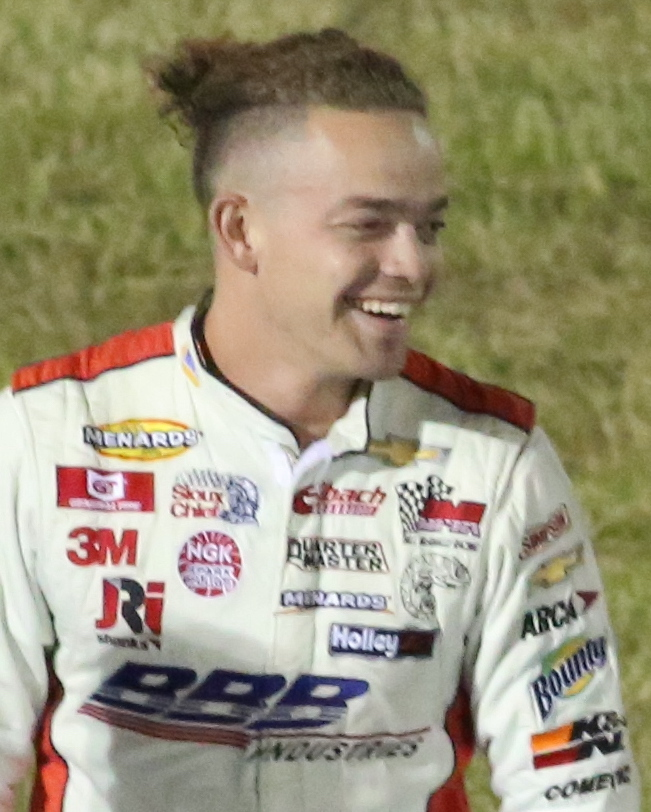
Cole Moore finished third in the championship.

The 2022 ARCA Menards Series West was the 69th season of the ARCA Menards Series West, a regional stock car racing series sanctioned by NASCAR in the United States. The season began on March 11 at Phoenix Raceway with the General Tire 150 and ended with the Desert Diamond Casino West Valley 100, also at Phoenix Raceway, on November 4.

Jesse Love, who won the championship for the last 2 years, did not go for a three-peat. Love revealed in an interview in October 2021 with Frontstretch that he would not return to the West Series full-time in 2022 and he ran the majority of the main ARCA Series season for Venturini Motorsports. He had driven for the team part-time in that series in 2020 and 2021.

This season also saw a historic milestone, as the race at Evergreen Speedway on August 20 marked the 1,000th West Series race.

== Teams and drivers ==
=== Complete schedule ===
Manufacturer	Team	No.	Driver	Crew chief
Chevrolet	Bill McAnally Racing	16	Austin Herzog (R) 5	Charlie Wilson
Chevrolet	Bill McAnally Racing	16	Landen Lewis 6	Charlie Wilson
Chevrolet	BMI Racing	88	Bridget Burgess	Sarah Burgess 10; Victor Franco 1
Ford	Naake-Klauer Motorsports	54	Joey Iest	Mike Naake
Ford	Sunrise Ford Racing	6	Jake Drew	Bill Sedgwick
Ford	Sunrise Ford Racing	9	Tanner Reif (R)	Jeff Schrader
Toyota	Jerry Pitts Racing	7	Takuma Koga	Jerry Pitts 6 Denny Moyer 5
Toyota	Nascimento Motorsports	4	Sebastian Arias (R) 7	Henry Nascimento 1 Mike Nascimento 6 Ty Joiner 1
Toyota	Nascimento Motorsports	4	Eric Nascimento 1	Henry Nascimento 1 Mike Nascimento 6 Ty Joiner 1
Toyota	Nascimento Motorsports	4	Sean Hingorani 3 (Note: Sean Hingorani's Portland (race #8) entry was fielded as the No. 04 but counted towards the No. 4's rank in the Owners' Championship.)	Henry Nascimento 1 Mike Nascimento 6 Ty Joiner 1
Chevrolet 8 Toyota 3	Bill McAnally Racing	99	Cole Moore	Mario Isola
Ford 7 Toyota 4	Central Coast Racing	13	Todd Souza	Michael Muñoz

=== Limited schedule ===
Note: If a driver is listed as their own crew chief for a particular race, that means that their entry in that race was a start and park.

Manufacturer	Team	No.	Driver	Crew chief	Rounds
Chevrolet	1/4 Ley Racing	32	Dale Quarterley	Alex Quarterley	2
Chevrolet	66 Rhead Racing	66	Eric Rhead	Roxi Gabbard	3
Chevrolet	Bill McAnally Racing	27	John Moore	Eric Schmidt	1
Chevrolet	Bill McAnally Racing	83	Jalen Mack	Auggie Vidovich	1
Chevrolet	BMI Racing	97	Sarah Burgess	Victor Franco	1
Chevrolet	Brad Smith Motorsports	48	Brad Smith	Rand Bitter	1
Chevrolet	Bret Holmes Racing	23	Connor Mosack	Shane Huffman	1
Chevrolet	Davey Magras Racing	14	Davey Magras	Zach Magras	1
Chevrolet	Fast Track Racing	11	Bryce Haugeberg (Note: Entry was fielded in a collaboration with Haugeberg Racing.)	Mike Sroufe	1
Chevrolet	Fast Track Racing	12	D. L. Wilson	Dick Doheny	1
Chevrolet	Fierce Creature Racing	27	Bobby Hillis Jr.	Ralph Byers	2
Chevrolet	GMS Racing (Note: Entries were fielded in a collaboration with Bill McAnally Racing.)	43	Daniel Dye	Chad Bryant 1 Travis Sharpe 1	2
Chevrolet	Last Chance Racing	39	Andrew Tuttle (R)	Michael Parker 3 Taniesha Tuttle 6 TBA 1	10
Chevrolet	Lowden Motorsports (Note: Entries are fielded in a collaboration with Kart Idaho Racing.)	11	Chris Lowden (R)	Tony Jackson	7
Chevrolet	Lowden Motorsports	11	Nick Joanides	Tony Jackson	1
Chevrolet	McGowan Motorsports	17	Josh Berry	Amber Slagle 2 Sean Samuels 3	1
Chevrolet	McGowan Motorsports	17	Amber Slagle	Amber Slagle 2 Sean Samuels 3	2
Chevrolet	McGowan Motorsports	17	Connor Mosack	Amber Slagle 2 Sean Samuels 3	1
Chevrolet	McGowan Motorsports	17	Landen Lewis	Amber Slagle 2 Sean Samuels 3	1
Chevrolet	McGowan Motorsports	17	Buddy Shepherd	Amber Slagle 2 Sean Samuels 3	2
Chevrolet	Niece Motorsports	40	Dean Thompson	Joe Lax	1
Chevrolet	Niece Motorsports	40	Carson Hocevar	Joe Lax	1
Chevrolet	Pedroncelli Motorsports	31	Paul Pedroncelli	Rodd Kneeland 5 Unknown 1 (Note: Rodd Kneeland was erroneously listed as the crew chief for Pedroncelli on the Sonoma (race #5) entry list. He could not have crew chiefed in that race because he drove in the race in the No. 68 car.)	7
Chevrolet	Rev Racing	2	Nick Sanchez	Matt Bucher	1
Chevrolet	Rev Racing	61	Rajah Caruth	Brad Parrott	1
Chevrolet	Rodd Racing	68	Rodd Kneeland	Tony Caputo	1
Chevrolet	Young's Motorsports	02	Katie Hettinger	Andrew Abbott	2
Ford	Clubb Racing Inc.	03	Alex Clubb	Brian Clubb	1
Ford	David Gilliland Racing	17	Taylor Gray	Chad Johnston	1
Ford	David Gilliland Racing	51	Andrés Pérez de Lara	Derek Smith	2
Ford	David Gilliland Racing	71	Taylor Gray	Chad Johnston	2
Ford	Greg Van Alst Motorsports	35	Greg Van Alst	Jim Long	1
Ford	High Point Racing	50	Trevor Huddleston	Travis Thirkettle	4
Ford	Jerry Pitts Racing	5	Jacob Smith	Unknown	1
Ford	Lowden Motorsports	41	Tyler Reif	Tony Jackson	2
Ford	Mystic Motorsports	07	Brian Kaltreider	Keith Tibbs	1
Ford	Naake-Klauer Motorsports	84	Bradley Erickson	Tony Caputo	3
Ford	Rette Jones Racing	30	Amber Balcaen	Mark Rette	1
Toyota	Bill McAnally Racing	21	Jack Wood (Note: Entry was fielded in a collaboration with GMS Racing.)	Tom Ackerman	1
Toyota	Bill McAnally Racing	91	Colby Howard	John Camilleri	1
Toyota	Fast Track Racing	10	Zachary Tinkle (Note: Entry was fielded in a collaboration with Wayne Peterson Racing.)	Wayne Peterson	1
Toyota	Kyle Busch Motorsports	18	Sammy Smith	Mark McFarland	2
Toyota	Nascimento Motorsports	04	Sarah Burgess (Note: Entry was fielded in a collaboration with BMI Racing and Spurgeon Motorsports.)	Mike David	1
Toyota	Nascimento Motorsports	04	Eric Nascimento	Mike Nascimento	1
Toyota	Nascimento Motorsports	04	Sean Hingorani	Ty Joiner	1
Toyota	Performance P-1 Motorsports	77	Nick Joanides	Dave McKenzie 4 Sonny Wahl 1	5
Toyota	Performance P-1 Motorsports	77	Tripp Gaylord	Dave McKenzie 4 Sonny Wahl 1	1
Toyota	Philpott Race Cars	52	Ryan Philpott	Chuck Dozhier	2
Toyota	Phoenix Racing	1	Jake Finch	Johnny Allen	2
Toyota	Shockwave Motorsports	05	David Smith	Dave Fuge	4
Toyota	Venturini Motorsports	15	Parker Chase	Kevin Reed	2
Toyota	Venturini Motorsports	20	Jesse Love	Shannon Rursch	2
Toyota	Venturini Motorsports	25	Toni Breidinger	Kevin Reed Jr.	1
Toyota	Venturini Motorsports	25	Conner Jones	Kevin Reed Jr.	1
Toyota	Venturini Motorsports	55	Landon Pembelton	Monon Rahman	1
Chevrolet 1 Toyota 1	Bill McAnally Racing	19	Derek Kraus	Shane Wilson	1
Chevrolet 1 Toyota 1	Bill McAnally Racing	19	Sean Hingorani	Roger Bracken	1
Toyota 3 Chevrolet 1	Cook Racing Technologies	42	Christian Rose	Sean Samuels 1 Derek Peebles 2 TBA 1	3
Toyota 3 Chevrolet 1	Cook Racing Technologies	42	Landen Lewis	Sean Samuels 1 Derek Peebles 2 TBA 1	1
Toyota 3 Chevrolet 1	Cook Racing Technologies	42	Amber Slagle	Sean Samuels 1 Derek Peebles 2 TBA 1	1
Chevrolet 1 Toyota 1	Fast Track Racing	01	Tim Monroe	Tim Monroe	1
Chevrolet 1 Toyota 1	Fast Track Racing	01	Zach Herrin	Mike Sroufe	1
Chevrolet 2 Ford 5	Kyle Keller Racing (Note: Entries at Irwindale (race #6), Evergreen (race #7), All American (race #9), Bullring (race #10) and Phoenix 2 (race #11) were fielded in a collaboration with Jerry Pitts Racing.)	12	Kyle Keller (R)	John Keller 2 Jerry Pitts 4 TBA 1	7
Toyota 1 Chevrolet 5	Last Chance Racing	85	Ryan Roulette	Josh Fanopoulos	1
Toyota 1 Chevrolet 5	Last Chance Racing	85	Vince Little	Darrell Herzog	5
Chevrolet 1 Toyota 1	Legal Limit Motorsports	80	Brian Kamisky	Derek Copeland	2
Toyota 1 Ford 1 Chevrolet 2	Lowden Motorsports	21	Stafford Smith	Mike Holleran	1
Toyota 1 Ford 1 Chevrolet 2	Lowden Motorsports	21	R. J. Smotherman	Matt Jackson	4
Toyota 5 Chevrolet 2	Pedroncelli Motorsports	33	P. J. Pedroncelli	Ty Joiner	7
Toyota 1 Chevrolet 1	Spurgeon Motorsports	86	Tim Spurgeon	Mike David	2

=== Changes ===
==== Teams ====
- On January 4, 2022, Kyle Keller, who drove part-time for Jerry Pitts Racing in 2020 and 2021, announced that he would start his own team, Kyle Keller Racing, which would field one full-time car with himself driving it for the full season. The car number would be the No. 12 in all races except the season-opener at Phoenix, where it was the No. 70. (That race was a combination race with the main ARCA Series where Fast Track Racing uses the No. 12.)
- On January 26, 2022, Chris Lowden, who drove part-time for Kart Idaho Racing in 2020, announced that he would start his own team, Lowden Motorsports, which would field one full-time car with himself driving it for the full season. Lowden's team would also have an alliance with KIR. The car number would be the No. 11 in all races except the season-opener at Phoenix, where it was the No. 21. (That race was a combination race with the main ARCA Series where Fast Track Racing uses the No. 11.)
- On the Irwindale March entry list, Trevor Huddleston, who drove full-time for Sunrise Ford Racing from 2019 to 2021, would return to the series under his own team, High Point Racing, which would field one part-time car with himself driving it for select races. The car number would be the No. 50.
- On September 28, 2022, it was announced that BMI Racing would field a second part-time car, the No. 97, at the Las Vegas Bullring which will be driven by Sarah Burgess, the owner of the team who is usually the crew chief of the team's No. 88 car driven by her daughter Bridget. It will mark the first time in series history that a mother and her daughter will compete against each other in a NASCAR or ARCA race.

==== Drivers ====
- On August 12, 2021, Bill McAnally Racing mentioned that it was possible that Sebastian Arias, one of the team's part-time drivers in 2021, could run full-time in the West Series for them in 2022. On March 25, 2022, it was announced that Arias would run seven races in the No. 4 car for Nascimento Motorsports in 2022. The No. 4 car was one of McAnally's part-time cars in 2021 but the Nascimento family (including 2021 BMR driver Eric and crew chiefs Henry and Mike) took over ownership of the car for 2022.
- On January 3, 2022, it was announced that Austin Herzog would replace Jesse Love in the Bill McAnally Racing No. 16 car. Those plans would later change on June 29, when it was announced that Landen Lewis would replace Herzog in the BMR No. 16 car.
- On January 18, 2022, it was announced that Andrew Tuttle would make his first full-time appearance in the ARCA West in his own No. 39.
- On January 28, 2022, it was announced that Tanner Reif would replace Trevor Huddleston in the Sunrise Ford Racing No. 9 car.
- On the Phoenix entry list, it was revealed that Eric Rhead would make his West Series debut in the No. 66 car for his own team, 66 Rhead Racing.
- On April 1, 2022, it was revealed that Christian Rose would attempt 9 races in the main ARCA series, 5 races in the East Series, and 3 races in the West Series for Cook Racing Technologies. On the KCR entry list, it was revealed that Landen Lewis would make his debut in the West Series in the No. 42.
- On the KCR entry list, it was revealed that Tripp Gaylord, the son of Scott Gaylord, would make his debut with the No. 77 for Joe Nava. On the Portland June entry list, it was revealed that Clark Lukens would make his debut in the car, but failed to do so.
- On April 27, 2022, ARCA indefinitely suspended Daniel Dye due to his arrest on a felony battery charge in Volusia County, Florida. On May 13, ARCA announced that Dye would be reinstated after his charges were reduced by the Florida state attorney's office.
- On May 12, 2022, Vincent Delforge from Kickin' the Tires revealed that Davey Magras would make his West Series debut in the No. 14 car for his own team, Davey Magras Racing, in the race at Portland in September.
- On the Portland June entry list, it was revealed that Vince Little would make his debut in the No. 85 car for Last Chance Racing.
- On the Irwindale July entry list, it was revealed that Bradley Erickson would make his debut for Naake-Klauer Motorsports, which is his late model team. He drove a second car for the team, the No. 84.
- On the Evergreen entry list, it was revealed that David Smith (from Canada) would make his debut in the No. 05 car for Shockwave Motorsports.
- On the Evergreen entry list, it was revealed that Sean Hingorani would make his debut for Nascimento Motorsports, which is his late model team. He drove the No. 4 car.
- On September 30, 2022, it was announced that John Moore would make his first West Series start since 2015, driving the No. 27 car for Bill McAnally Racing in the race at All American Speedway. He is the father of Cole Moore, who drives full-time in the West Series in McAnally's No. 99 car, so the two of them would be teammates in the race. It would be the first time that they would race against each other in the West Series.
- On October 10, 2022, Vincent Delforge from Kickin' the Tires revealed that Tyler Reif, the brother of Tanner, would make his West Series debut in the No. 41 car for Lowden Motorsports, in the race at the Bullring in October.

==== Manufacturers ====
- On October 13, 2021, Bill McAnally Racing announced that they would be switching from Toyota to Chevrolet in 2022 and would have an alliance with GMS Racing. The team had been a Toyota team from 2008 to 2021 but was previously a Chevrolet team in 2007 and earlier. Due to the inability to build enough new Chevrolet road course cars in time, the team would end up fielding their old Toyotas unbadged in the road course races for all of their cars except the No. 16.

== Schedule ==
Phoenix Raceway and Sonoma Raceway announced their 2022 race dates in tweets on September 29. The rest of the schedule was announced on November 19. The date of the season-finale at Phoenix would later be moved from Saturday, November 5 to Friday, November 4.

Note: The race at Phoenix in March was a combination race with the ARCA Menards Series (highlighted in gold).

No	Race title	Track	Date
1	General Tire 150	Phoenix Raceway, Avondale, Arizona	March 11
2	NAPA Auto Parts 150 presented by the West Coast Stock Car Hall of Fame	Irwindale Speedway, Irwindale, California	March 26
3	Salute to the Oil Industry NAPA Auto Parts 150	Kern County Raceway Park, Bakersfield, California	April 23
4	Portland 112	Portland International Raceway, Portland, Oregon	June 4
5	General Tire 200	Sonoma Raceway, Sonoma, California	June 11
6	NAPA Auto Parts 150 presented by the West Coast Stock Car Hall of Fame	Irwindale Speedway, Irwindale, California	July 2
7	NAPA Auto Parts ARCA West 150	Evergreen Speedway, Monroe, Washington	August 20
8	ARCA Portland 112	Portland International Raceway, Portland, Oregon	September 3
9	NAPA Auto Parts 150 presented by Berco Redwood	All American Speedway, Roseville, California	October 1
10	Star Nursery 150	Las Vegas Motor Speedway (Bullring), Las Vegas, Nevada	October 14
11	Desert Diamond Casino West Valley 100	Phoenix Raceway, Avondale, Arizona	November 4

=== Schedule changes ===
The 2022 schedule features 11 races, which is the same number of races that there were on the 2020 schedule. The 2021 schedule only had 9 races.

- Irwindale Speedway's August date moves to March. (The track's other race remains on the 4th of July weekend.)
- After being taken off the schedule in 2021, Kern County Raceway Park and Evergreen Speedway were both added back onto the 2022 schedule. Their races will be in April and August, respectively.
- Portland International Raceway was given a second race to be held on the first weekend of June, which is the same weekend as the track's new Xfinity Series race. As a result, the race at Sonoma Raceway was pushed back a week to the second weekend of June. The race at Sonoma will also go back to using the chute instead of the carousel, which was used in 2019 and 2021.
- Colorado National Speedway was taken off the schedule. This will be the first season since 2006 that the West Series will not have had a race at the track.
- The race at the Las Vegas Motor Speedway Bullring moves from September to October along with the weekend's Cup Series race at the big LVMS track.

=== Broadcasting ===
The TV lineup is similar to what it looked like in 2021, with NBC airing all of the non-combination races on tape delay and MAVTV airing the combination race at Phoenix (which is also the season-opener). However, USA Network will be the channel that the NBC races are aired on instead of NBCSN, which was shut down at the end of 2021.

NBC Sports TrackPass, which previously had the streaming rights to all of races, lost the rights to FloRacing.

== Results and standings ==
=== Race results ===
No.	Race	Pole position	Most laps led	Winning driver	Manufacturer	No.	Winning team	Report
1	General Tire 150	Sammy Smith	Sammy Smith	Taylor Gray	Ford	17	David Gilliland Racing	Report
2	NAPA Auto Parts 150 (March race)	Tanner Reif	Tanner Reif	Tanner Reif	Ford	9	Sunrise Ford Racing	Report
3	Salute to the Oil Industry NAPA Auto Parts 150	P. J. Pedroncelli	P. J. Pedroncelli	Landen Lewis	Chevrolet	42	Cook Racing Technologies	Report
4	Portland 112	Daniel Dye	Jake Drew	Jake Drew	Ford	6	Sunrise Ford Racing	Report
5	General Tire 200	Jake Drew	Jake Drew	Jake Drew	Ford	6	Sunrise Ford Racing	Report
6	NAPA Auto Parts 150 (July race)	Jake Drew	Jake Drew	Jake Drew	Ford	6	Sunrise Ford Racing	Report
7	NAPA Auto Parts ARCA West 150	Tanner Reif	Cole Moore	Tanner Reif	Ford	9	Sunrise Ford Racing	Report
8	ARCA Portland 112	Jake Drew	Jake Drew	Jake Drew	Ford	6	Sunrise Ford Racing	Report
9	NAPA Auto Parts 150 presented by Berco Redwood	Jake Drew	Cole Moore	Cole Moore	Chevrolet	99	Bill McAnally Racing	Report
10	Star Nursery 150	Taylor Gray	Taylor Gray	Taylor Gray	Ford	71	David Gilliland Racing	Report
11	Desert Diamond Casino West Valley 100	Sammy Smith	Sammy Smith	Sammy Smith	Toyota	18	Kyle Busch Motorsports	Report

=== Drivers' championship ===
Notes:

- The pole winner also receives one bonus point, similar to the previous ARCA points system used until 2019 and unlike NASCAR.
- Additionally, after groups of five races of the season, drivers that compete in all five races receive fifty additional points. These points bonuses will be given after the races at Sonoma and the Las Vegas Bullring.
  - Jake Drew, Todd Souza, Tanner Reif, Cole Moore, Austin Herzog, P. J. Pedroncelli, Joey Iest, Takuma Koga, Bridget Burgess and Paul Pedroncelli received this points bonus for having competed in the first five races of the season (Phoenix in March, Irwindale in April, Kern County, Portland in June, and Sonoma).

(key) Bold – Pole position awarded by time. Italics – Pole position set by final practice results or rainout. * – Most laps led. ** – All laps led.

Pos	Driver	PHO	IRW	KCR	PIR	SON	IRW	EVG	PIR	AAS	LVS	PHO	Points
1	Jake Drew	5	4	2	1*	**1***	**1****	2	**1***	**2**	8	13	621
2	Tanner Reif **(R)**	16	**1****	4	6	18	7	**1**	3	6	6	10	568
3	Cole Moore	11	2	3	11	12	2	4*	4	1	14	14	563
4	Todd Souza	12	9	6	3	8	10	5	2	4	10	5	563
5	Joey Iest	13	10	17	10	5	13	3	8	3	11	24	518
6	Takuma Koga	18	7	9	5	19	18	9	5	18	21	15	490
7	Bridget Burgess	23	12	12	7	10	19	10	10	19	12	17	483
8	Landen Lewis			1		14	5	6	9	17	3	6	398
9	Andrew Tuttle **(R)**	35	Wth	15	12	13	14	11	13	22	26		285
10	P. J. Pedroncelli	17	5	**5***	8	16	11			16			283
11	Kyle Keller **(R)**	32	Wth	14			4	7		5	4	25	267
12	Sebastian Arias	25	8	13		21	8			13		16	254
13	Austin Herzog **(R)**	14	3	8	9	6							230
14	Chris Lowden **(R)**	31	13				12	12		20	24	30	216
15	Paul Pedroncelli	38	15	18	16	23	21			21			206
16	Sean Hingorani							14	12	15	25	23	181
17	Bradley Erickson						20			12	7	7	180
18	Nick Joanides	Wth	11	11		22	17			10	15		178
19	Taylor Gray	1									**1***	27	164
20	David Smith							13		11	19	20	163
21	R. J. Smotherman							15		7	22	26	156
22	Vince Little				14	11			11	14	16		154
23	Trevor Huddleston		6	7			3	8					152
24	Sammy Smith	**3***										**1***	143
25	Andrés Pérez de Lara										2	3	134
26	Jesse Love	6										2	130
27	Jake Finch						6					9	123
28	Buddy Shepherd										5	11	122
29	Christian Rose	27					16					21	118
30	Parker Chase	20										8	110
31	Tyler Reif										18	12	108
32	Katie Hettinger										23	19	96
33	Amber Slagle			10			9				20		93
34	Landon Pembelton											4	90
35	Bobby Hillis Jr.	26										22	90
36	Daniel Dye	2			**4**								84
37	Connor Mosack	10			2								77
38	Zach Herrin											18	76
39	Dale Quarterley				15	3							70
40	Eric Nascimento				13	7							68
41	Conner Jones											28	66
42	Ryan Philpott					17			6				65
43	Eric Rhead	39		Wth			15				13		65
44	Carson Hocevar											29	65
45	Tim Spurgeon	19	Wth			9							60
46	Brian Kamisky					24				9			55
47	Sarah Burgess		DNS								17		55
48	Colby Howard					2							42
49	Rajah Caruth	4											40
50	Jack Wood					4							40
51	Nick Sanchez	7											37
52	Davey Magras								7				37
53	Josh Berry	8											36
54	John Moore									8			36
55	Derek Kraus	9											35
56	Jacob Smith										9		35
57	Stafford Smith		14										30
58	Toni Breidinger	15											29
59	Dean Thompson					15							29
60	Tripp Gaylord			16									28
61	Rodd Kneeland					20							24
62	Alex Clubb	21											23
63	Ryan Roulette	22											22
64	D. L. Wilson	24											20
65	Bryce Haugeberg	28											16
66	Zachary Tinkle	29											15
67	Amber Balcaen	30											14
68	Tim Monroe	33											11
69	Brad Smith	34											10
70	Greg Van Alst	36											8
71	Brian Kaltreider	37											7

== See also ==
- 2022 NASCAR Cup Series
- 2022 NASCAR Xfinity Series
- 2022 NASCAR Camping World Truck Series
- 2022 ARCA Menards Series
- 2022 ARCA Menards Series East
- 2022 NASCAR Whelen Modified Tour
- 2022 NASCAR Pinty's Series
- 2022 NASCAR Mexico Series
- 2022 NASCAR Whelen Euro Series
- 2022 SRX Series
- 2022 CARS Tour
- 2022 SMART Modified Tour
