= 2023 Rackley Roofing 200 =

13th race of the 2023 NASCAR Craftsman Truck Series

Race details
- Race 13 of 23 of the 2023 NASCAR Craftsman Truck Series
- Date: June 23, 2023
- Official name: 3rd Annual Rackley Roofing 200
- Location: Nashville Superspeedway, Gladeville, Tennessee
- Course: Permanent racing facility
- Course length: 1.333 miles (2.145 km)
- Distance: 150 laps, 199 mi (321 km)
- Scheduled distance: 150 laps, 199 mi (321 km)
- Average speed: 102.075 mph (164.274 km/h)

Pole position
Driver	Nick Sanchez	Rev Racing
- Time: 29.571

Most laps led
Driver	Corey Heim	Tricon Garage
- Laps: 57

Winner
No. 42	Carson Hocevar	Niece Motorsports

Television in the United States
- Network: FS1
- Announcers: Adam Alexander, Phil Parsons, and Michael Waltrip

Radio in the United States
- Radio: MRN

The 2023 Rackley Roofing 200 was the 13th stock car race of the 2023 NASCAR Craftsman Truck Series, the third and final race of the Triple Truck Challenge, and the 3rd iteration of the event. The race was held on Friday, June 23, 2023, in Gladeville, Tennessee at Nashville Superspeedway, a 1.333 miles (2.145 km) permanent tri-oval shaped racetrack. The race took the scheduled 150 laps to complete. Carson Hocevar, driving for Niece Motorsports, would hold off Zane Smith and a fast-charging Nick Sanchez on the final lap, and earned his second career NASCAR Craftsman Truck Series win, and his second of the season. Corey Heim dominated the majority of the race, leading a race-high 57 laps. To fill out the podium, Smith, driving for Front Row Motorsports, and Sanchez, driving for Rev Racing, would finish 2nd and 3rd, respectively.

== Background ==
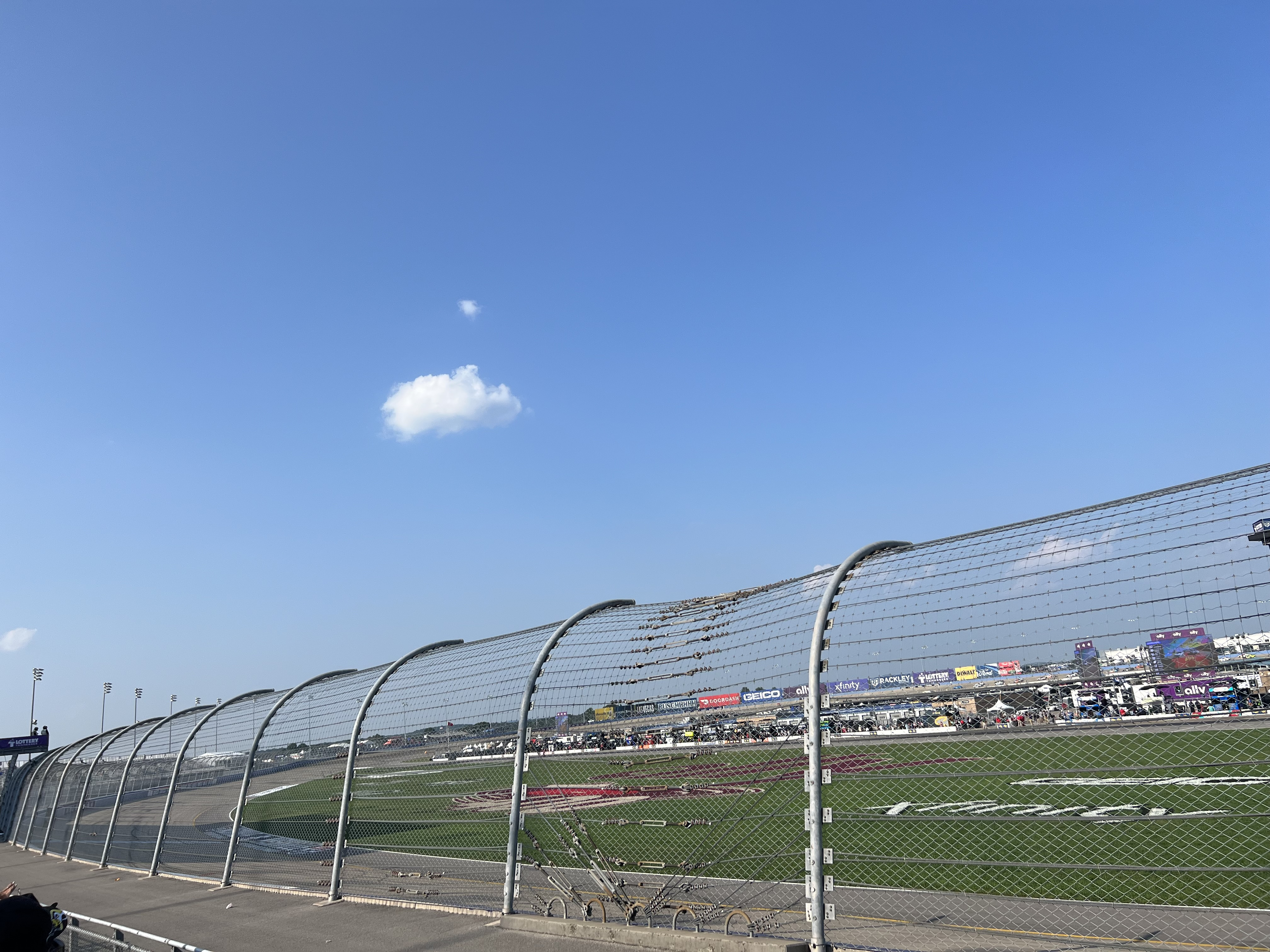
Nashville Superspeedway, the place where the race was held.

Nashville Superspeedway is a motor racing complex located in Gladeville, Tennessee, United States, about 30 miles (48 km) southeast of Nashville. The track was built in 2001 and is currently used for events, driving schools and GT Academy, a reality television competition.

It is a concrete oval track 1 1/3 miles (2.146 km) long. Nashville Superspeedway is owned by Dover Motorsports, Inc., which also owns Dover International Speedway. Nashville Superspeedway was the longest concrete oval in NASCAR during the time it was on the NASCAR Xfinity Series and NASCAR Craftsman Truck Series circuits. Current permanent seating capacity is approximately 25,000. Additional portable seats are brought in for some events, and seating capacity can be expanded to 150,000. Infrastructure is in place to expand the facility to include a short track, drag strip, and road course.

=== Entry list ===
- (R) denotes rookie driver.

#	Driver	Team	Make
1	Toni Breidinger	Tricon Garage	Toyota
02	Layne Riggs	Young's Motorsports	Chevrolet
2	Nick Sanchez (R)	Rev Racing	Chevrolet
04	Cory Roper	Roper Racing	Ford
4	Chase Purdy	Kyle Busch Motorsports	Chevrolet
5	Dean Thompson	Tricon Garage	Toyota
9	Colby Howard	CR7 Motorsports	Chevrolet
11	Corey Heim	Tricon Garage	Toyota
12	Spencer Boyd	Young's Motorsports	Chevrolet
13	Hailie Deegan	ThorSport Racing	Ford
14	Trey Hutchens	Trey Hutchens Racing	Chevrolet
15	Tanner Gray	Tricon Garage	Toyota
16	Tyler Ankrum	Hattori Racing Enterprises	Toyota
17	Taylor Gray (R)	Tricon Garage	Toyota
19	Christian Eckes	McAnally-Hilgemann Racing	Chevrolet
20	Nick Leitz	Young's Motorsports	Chevrolet
23	Grant Enfinger	GMS Racing	Chevrolet
24	Rajah Caruth (R)	GMS Racing	Chevrolet
25	Matt DiBenedetto	Rackley WAR	Chevrolet
30	Jonathan Shafer	On Point Motorsports	Toyota
32	Bret Holmes (R)	Bret Holmes Racing	Chevrolet
33	Chase Janes	Reaume Brothers Racing	Ford
34	Mason Maggio	Reaume Brothers Racing	Ford
35	Jake Garcia (R)	McAnally-Hilgemann Racing	Chevrolet
38	Zane Smith	Front Row Motorsports	Ford
41	Bayley Currey	Niece Motorsports	Chevrolet
42	Carson Hocevar	Niece Motorsports	Chevrolet
43	Daniel Dye (R)	GMS Racing	Chevrolet
45	Lawless Alan	Niece Motorsports	Chevrolet
46	Memphis Villarreal	G2G Racing	Toyota
51	Jack Wood	Kyle Busch Motorsports	Chevrolet
52	Stewart Friesen	Halmar Friesen Racing	Toyota
56	Timmy Hill	Hill Motorsports	Toyota
66	Jake Drew	ThorSport Racing	Ford
88	Matt Crafton	ThorSport Racing	Ford
98	Ty Majeski	ThorSport Racing	Ford
99	Ben Rhodes	ThorSport Racing	Ford
Official entry list

== Practice ==
The first and only practice session was held on Friday, June 23, at 3:00 PM CST, and would last for 20 minutes. Carson Hocevar, driving for Niece Motorsports, would set the fastest time in the session, with a lap of 30.248, and an average speed of 158.291 mph (254.745 km/h).

Pos.	#	Driver	Team	Make	Time	Speed
1	42	Carson Hocevar	Niece Motorsports	Chevrolet	30.248	158.291
2	38	Zane Smith	Front Row Motorsports	Ford	30.503	156.968
3	41	Bayley Currey	Niece Motorsports	Chevrolet	30.512	156.922
Full practice results

== Qualifying ==
Qualifying was held on Friday, June 23, at 3:30 PM CST. Since Nashville Superspeedway is an intermediate racetrack, the qualifying system used is a single-car, one-lap system with only one round. In that round, whoever sets the fastest time will win the pole. Nick Sanchez, driving for Rev Racing, would score the pole for the race, with a lap of 29.571, and an average speed of 161.915 mph (260.577 km/h).

Pos.	#	Driver	Team	Make	Time	Speed
1	2	Nick Sanchez (R)	Rev Racing	Chevrolet	29.571	161.915
2	41	Bayley Currey	Niece Motorsports	Chevrolet	29.584	161.844
3	24	Rajah Caruth (R)	GMS Racing	Chevrolet	29.622	161.637
4	11	Corey Heim	Tricon Garage	Toyota	29.623	161.631
5	15	Tanner Gray	Tricon Garage	Toyota	29.714	161.136
6	23	Grant Enfinger	GMS Racing	Chevrolet	29.743	160.979
7	42	Carson Hocevar	Niece Motorsports	Chevrolet	29.747	160.947
8	38	Zane Smith	Front Row Motorsports	Ford	29.750	160.941
9	43	Daniel Dye (R)	GMS Racing	Chevrolet	29.753	160.925
10	17	Taylor Gray (R)	Tricon Garage	Toyota	29.780	160.779
11	98	Ty Majeski	ThorSport Racing	Ford	29.848	160.413
12	4	Chase Purdy	Kyle Busch Motorsports	Chevrolet	29.917	160.043
13	51	Jack Wood	Kyle Busch Motorsports	Chevrolet	29.953	159.850
14	19	Christian Eckes	McAnally-Hilgemann Racing	Chevrolet	30.008	159.557
15	25	Matt DiBenedetto	Rackley WAR	Chevrolet	30.106	159.038
16	99	Ben Rhodes	ThorSport Racing	Ford	30.109	159.022
17	16	Tyler Ankrum	Hattori Racing Enterprises	Toyota	30.180	158.648
18	52	Stewart Friesen	Halmar Friesen Racing	Toyota	30.205	158.517
19	45	Lawless Alan	Niece Motorsports	Chevrolet	30.209	158.496
20	13	Hailie Deegan	ThorSport Racing	Ford	30.228	158.396
21	35	Jake Garcia (R)	McAnally-Hilgemann Racing	Chevrolet	30.271	158.171
22	56	Timmy Hill	Hill Motorsports	Toyota	30.376	157.624
23	88	Matt Crafton	ThorSport Racing	Ford	30.431	157.340
24	66	Jake Drew	ThorSport Racing	Ford	30.567	156.640
25	9	Colby Howard	CR7 Motorsports	Chevrolet	30.701	155.956
26	32	Bret Holmes (R)	Bret Holmes Racing	Chevrolet	30.891	154.997
27	30	Jonathan Shafer	On Point Motorsports	Toyota	30.924	154.831
28	1	Toni Breidinger	Tricon Garage	Toyota	30.985	154.526
29	20	Nick Leitz	Young's Motorsports	Chevrolet	31.026	154.322
30	46	Memphis Villarreal	G2G Racing	Toyota	31.260	153.167
31	02	Layne Riggs	Young's Motorsports	Chevrolet	31.273	153.103
Qualified by owner's points
32	34	Mason Maggio	Reaume Brothers Racing	Ford	31.330	152.825
33	12	Spencer Boyd	Young's Motorsports	Chevrolet	31.450	152.242
34	04	Cory Roper	Roper Racing	Ford	31.518	151.913
35	33	Chase Janes	Reaume Brothers Racing	Ford	31.720	150.946
36	5	Dean Thompson	Tricon Garage	Toyota	–	–
Failed to qualify
37	14	Trey Hutchens	Trey Hutchens Racing	Chevrolet	31.630	151.375
Withdrew
38	90	Justin Carroll	TC Motorsports	Toyota	–	–
Official qualifying results
Official starting lineup

== Race results ==
Stage 1 Laps: 45

Pos.	#	Driver	Team	Make	Pts
1	38	Zane Smith	Front Row Motorsports	Ford	10
2	2	Nick Sanchez (R)	Rev Racing	Chevrolet	9
3	41	Bayley Currey	Niece Motorsports	Chevrolet	8
4	42	Carson Hocevar	Niece Motorsports	Chevrolet	7
5	11	Corey Heim	Tricon Garage	Toyota	6
6	16	Tyler Ankrum	Hattori Racing Enterprises	Toyota	5
7	15	Tanner Gray	Tricon Garage	Toyota	4
8	23	Grant Enfinger	GMS Racing	Chevrolet	3
9	25	Matt DiBenedetto	Rackley WAR	Chevrolet	2
10	17	Taylor Gray (R)	Tricon Garage	Toyota	1

Stage 2 Laps: 50

Pos.	#	Driver	Team	Make	Pts
1	11	Corey Heim	Tricon Garage	Toyota	10
2	42	Carson Hocevar	Niece Motorsports	Chevrolet	9
3	25	Matt DiBenedetto	Rackley WAR	Chevrolet	8
4	38	Zane Smith	Front Row Motorsports	Ford	7
5	99	Ben Rhodes	ThorSport Racing	Ford	6
6	16	Tyler Ankrum	Hattori Racing Enterprises	Toyota	5
7	41	Bayley Currey	Niece Motorsports	Chevrolet	4
8	15	Tanner Gray	Tricon Garage	Toyota	3
9	66	Jake Drew	ThorSport Racing	Ford	2
10	19	Christian Eckes	McAnally-Hilgemann Racing	Chevrolet	1

Stage 3 Laps: 55

Fin	St	#	Driver	Team	Make	Laps	Led	Status	Pts
1	7	42	Carson Hocevar	Niece Motorsports	Chevrolet	150	40	Running	56
2	8	38	Zane Smith	Front Row Motorsports	Ford	150	11	Running	52
3	1	2	Nick Sanchez (R)	Rev Racing	Chevrolet	150	37	Running	43
4	4	11	Corey Heim	Tricon Garage	Toyota	150	57	Running	49
5	2	41	Bayley Currey	Niece Motorsports	Chevrolet	150	1	Running	44
6	12	4	Chase Purdy	Kyle Busch Motorsports	Chevrolet	150	0	Running	31
7	15	25	Matt DiBenedetto	Rackley WAR	Chevrolet	150	3	Running	40
8	17	16	Tyler Ankrum	Hattori Racing Enterprises	Toyota	150	0	Running	39
9	16	99	Ben Rhodes	ThorSport Racing	Ford	150	0	Running	34
10	21	35	Jake Garcia (R)	McAnally-Hilgemann Racing	Chevrolet	150	0	Running	27
11	5	15	Tanner Gray	Tricon Garage	Toyota	150	0	Running	33
12	24	66	Jake Drew	ThorSport Racing	Ford	150	0	Running	27
13	6	23	Grant Enfinger	GMS Racing	Chevrolet	150	0	Running	27
14	10	17	Taylor Gray (R)	Tricon Garage	Toyota	150	0	Running	24
15	23	88	Matt Crafton	ThorSport Racing	Ford	150	0	Running	22
16	22	56	Timmy Hill	Hill Motorsports	Toyota	150	0	Running	21
17	28	1	Toni Breidinger	Tricon Garage	Toyota	150	0	Running	20
18	18	52	Stewart Friesen	Halmar Friesen Racing	Toyota	150	0	Running	19
19	29	20	Nick Leitz	Young's Motorsports	Chevrolet	149	0	Running	18
20	32	34	Mason Maggio	Reaume Brothers Racing	Ford	149	0	Running	17
21	34	04	Cory Roper	Roper Racing	Ford	148	0	Running	16
22	9	43	Daniel Dye (R)	GMS Racing	Chevrolet	148	0	Running	15
23	14	19	Christian Eckes	McAnally-Hilgemann Racing	Chevrolet	148	0	Running	14
24	27	30	Jonathan Shafer	On Point Motorsports	Toyota	147	0	Running	13
25	33	12	Spencer Boyd	Young's Motorsports	Chevrolet	147	0	Running	12
26	35	33	Chase Janes	Reaume Brothers Racing	Ford	147	0	Running	11
27	31	02	Layne Riggs	Young's Motorsports	Chevrolet	147	0	Running	10
28	20	13	Hailie Deegan	ThorSport Racing	Ford	146	0	Running	9
29	25	9	Colby Howard	CR7 Motorsports	Chevrolet	144	0	Running	8
30	13	51	Jack Wood	Kyle Busch Motorsports	Chevrolet	144	0	Running	7
31	11	98	Ty Majeski	ThorSport Racing	Ford	133	0	Running	6
32	3	24	Rajah Caruth (R)	GMS Racing	Chevrolet	119	1	Running	5
33	36	5	Dean Thompson	Tricon Garage	Toyota	104	0	DVP	4
34	26	32	Bret Holmes (R)	Bret Holmes Racing	Chevrolet	92	0	Accident	3
35	30	46	Memphis Villarreal	G2G Racing	Toyota	26	0	Electrical	2
36	19	45	Lawless Alan	Niece Motorsports	Chevrolet	7	0	Accident	1
Official race results

== Standings after the race ==
Drivers' Championship standings

	Pos	Driver	Points
	1	Corey Heim	474
2	2	Zane Smith	458 (-16)
	3	Grant Enfinger	443 (-31)
2	4	Ty Majeski	430 (-44)
	5	Ben Rhodes	427 (-47)
	6	Christian Eckes	404 (-70)
	7	Carson Hocevar	393 (-81)
2	8	Matt DiBenedetto	358 (-116)
1	9	Matt Crafton	354 (-120)
2	10	Nick Sanchez	350 (-124)
Official driver's standings

- Note: Only the first 10 positions are included for the driver standings.

Previous race: 2023 Toyota 200	NASCAR Craftsman Truck Series; 2023 season	Next race: 2023 O'Reilly Auto Parts 150 at Mid-Ohio
