= 2023 Kansas Lottery 200 =

19th race of the 2023 NASCAR Craftsman Truck Series

Race details
- Race 19 of 23 of the 2023 NASCAR Craftsman Truck Series
- Date: September 8, 2023
- Official name: Second Annual Kansas Lottery 200
- Location: Kansas Speedway, Kansas City, Kansas
- Course: Permanent racing facility
- Course length: 1.5 miles (2.4 km)
- Distance: 134 laps, 201 mi (323 km)
- Scheduled distance: 134 laps, 201 mi (323 km)
- Average speed: 111.960 mph (180.182 km/h)

Pole position
Driver	Chase Purdy	Kyle Busch Motorsports
- Time: 30.631

Most laps led
Driver	Nick Sanchez	Rev Racing
- Laps: 43

Winner
No. 19	Christian Eckes	McAnally-Hilgemann Racing

Television in the United States
- Network: FS1
- Announcers: Jamie Little, Phil Parsons, and Michael Waltrip

Radio in the United States
- Radio: MRN

The 2023 Kansas Lottery 200 was the 19th stock car race of the 2023 NASCAR Craftsman Truck Series. It was the final race of the Round of 10, and the second iteration of the event. The race was held on Friday, September 8, 2023, in Kansas City, Kansas at Kansas Speedway, a 1.5 miles (2.4 km) permanent quad-oval shaped racetrack. The race took the scheduled 134 laps to complete. In a wild overtime finish, Christian Eckes, driving for McAnally-Hilgemann Racing, would steal the win after making a three-wide pass on Corey Heim and Zane Smith, taking the lead on the final corner and earning his fourth career NASCAR Craftsman Truck Series win, and his third of the season. Nick Sanchez, Heim, and Carson Hocevar would be the dominant drivers of the race, leading 43, 40, and 32 laps respectively. To fill out the podium, Taylor Gray, driving for Tricon Garage, and Matt DiBenedetto, driving for Rackley WAR, would finish 2nd and 3rd, respectively.

The eight drivers advancing into the next round of the playoffs are Corey Heim, Christian Eckes, Grant Enfinger, Carson Hocevar, Zane Smith, Ty Majeski, Ben Rhodes, and Nick Sanchez. Matt DiBenedetto and Matt Crafton would fail to advance.

== Background ==
Kansas Speedway is a 1.5-mile (2.4 km) tri-oval race track in Kansas City, Kansas. It was built in 2001 and it currently hosts two annual NASCAR race weekends. The IndyCar Series also raced at here until 2011. The speedway is owned and operated by the International Speedway Corporation.

=== Entry list ===
- (R) denotes rookie driver.
- (P) denotes playoff driver.
- (OP) denotes owner's playoffs truck.

#	Driver	Team	Make
1	Jesse Love	Tricon Garage	Toyota
02	Kaden Honeycutt	Young's Motorsports	Chevrolet
2	Nick Sanchez (R) (P)	Rev Racing	Chevrolet
04	Spencer Davis	Roper Racing	Ford
4	Chase Purdy	Kyle Busch Motorsports	Chevrolet
5	Dean Thompson	Tricon Garage	Toyota
9	Colby Howard	CR7 Motorsports	Chevrolet
10	Jennifer Jo Cobb	Jennifer Jo Cobb Racing	Chevrolet
11	Corey Heim (P)	Tricon Garage	Toyota
12	Spencer Boyd	Young's Motorsports	Chevrolet
13	Hailie Deegan	ThorSport Racing	Ford
15	Tanner Gray	Tricon Garage	Toyota
16	Tyler Ankrum	Hattori Racing Enterprises	Toyota
17	Taylor Gray (R)	Tricon Garage	Toyota
19	Christian Eckes (P)	McAnally-Hilgemann Racing	Chevrolet
20	Greg Van Alst	Young's Motorsports	Chevrolet
22	Mason Maggio	AM Racing	Ford
23	Grant Enfinger (P)	GMS Racing	Chevrolet
24	Rajah Caruth (R)	GMS Racing	Chevrolet
25	Matt DiBenedetto (P)	Rackley WAR	Chevrolet
32	Bret Holmes (R)	Bret Holmes Racing	Chevrolet
33	Chase Janes	Reaume Brothers Racing	Ford
35	Jake Garcia (R)	McAnally-Hilgemann Racing	Chevrolet
38	Zane Smith (P)	Front Row Motorsports	Ford
41	Bayley Currey	Niece Motorsports	Chevrolet
42	Carson Hocevar (P)	Niece Motorsports	Chevrolet
43	Daniel Dye (R)	GMS Racing	Chevrolet
45	Lawless Alan	Niece Motorsports	Chevrolet
51	Jack Wood (OP)	Kyle Busch Motorsports	Chevrolet
52	Stewart Friesen	Halmar Friesen Racing	Toyota
56	Timmy Hill	Hill Motorsports	Toyota
61	Jake Drew	Hattori Racing Enterprises	Toyota
88	Matt Crafton (P)	ThorSport Racing	Ford
90	Justin Carroll	TC Motorsports	Toyota
98	Ty Majeski (P)	ThorSport Racing	Ford
99	Ben Rhodes (P)	ThorSport Racing	Ford
Official entry list

== Practice ==
The first and only practice session was held on Friday, September 8, at 2:35 PM CST, and would last for 20 minutes. Ben Rhodes, driving for ThorSport Racing, would set the fastest time in the session, with a lap of 31.147, and an average speed of 173.371 mph (279.014 km/h).

Pos.	#	Driver	Team	Make	Time	Speed
1	99	Ben Rhodes	ThorSport Racing	Ford	31.147	173.371
2	4	Chase Purdy	Kyle Busch Motorsports	Chevrolet	31.156	173.321
3	98	Ty Majeski	ThorSport Racing	Ford	31.166	173.266
Full practice results

== Qualifying ==
Qualifying was held on Friday, September 8, at 3:05 PM CST. Since Kansas Speedway is an intermediate racetrack, the qualifying system used is a single-car, one-lap system with only one round. In that round, whoever sets the fastest time will win the pole. Chase Purdy, driving for Kyle Busch Motorsports, would score the pole for the race, with a lap of 30.631, and an average speed of 176.292 mph (283.714 km/h).

Pos.	#	Driver	Team	Make	Time	Speed
1	4	Chase Purdy	Kyle Busch Motorsports	Toyota	30.631	176.292
2	2	Nick Sanchez (R) (P)	Rev Racing	Chevrolet	30.647	176.200
3	98	Ty Majeski (P)	ThorSport Racing	Ford	30.686	175.976
4	51	Jack Wood (OP)	Kyle Busch Motorsports	Chevrolet	30.753	175.593
5	35	Jake Garcia (R)	McAnally-Hilgemann Racing	Chevrolet	30.756	175.575
6	99	Ben Rhodes (P)	ThorSport Racing	Ford	30.820	175.211
7	13	Hailie Deegan	ThorSport Racing	Ford	30.850	175.041
8	19	Christian Eckes (P)	McAnally-Hilgemann Racing	Chevrolet	30.853	175.023
9	1	Jesse Love	Tricon Garage	Toyota	30.930	174.588
10	61	Jake Drew	Hattori Racing Enterprises	Toyota	30.942	174.520
11	25	Matt DiBenedetto (P)	Rackley WAR	Chevrolet	30.986	174.272
12	23	Grant Enfinger (P)	GMS Racing	Chevrolet	30.994	174.227
13	5	Dean Thompson	Tricon Garage	Toyota	31.057	173.874
14	38	Zane Smith (P)	Front Row Motorsports	Ford	31.096	173.656
15	11	Corey Heim (P)	Tricon Garage	Toyota	31.104	173.611
16	17	Taylor Gray (R)	Tricon Garage	Toyota	31.114	173.555
17	42	Carson Hocevar (P)	Niece Motorsports	Chevrolet	31.143	173.394
18	15	Tanner Gray	Tricon Garage	Toyota	31.144	173.388
19	24	Rajah Caruth (R)	GMS Racing	Chevrolet	31.172	173.232
20	52	Stewart Friesen	Halmar Friesen Racing	Toyota	31.176	173.210
21	16	Tyler Ankrum	Hattori Racing Enterprises	Toyota	31.244	172.833
22	41	Bayley Currey	Niece Motorsports	Chevrolet	31.332	172.348
23	43	Daniel Dye (R)	GMS Racing	Chevrolet	31.432	171.799
24	32	Bret Holmes (R)	Bret Holmes Racing	Chevrolet	31.507	171.390
25	02	Kaden Honeycutt	Young's Motorsports	Chevrolet	31.736	170.154
26	22	Mason Maggio	AM Racing	Ford	32.296	167.203
27	12	Spencer Boyd	Young's Motorsports	Chevrolet	32.494	166.185
28	20	Greg Van Alst	Young's Motorsports	Chevrolet	33.409	161.633
29	90	Justin Carroll	TC Motorsports	Toyota	33.961	159.006
30	10	Jennifer Jo Cobb	Jennifer Jo Cobb Racing	Chevrolet	35.142	153.662
31	88	Matt Crafton (P)	ThorSport Racing	Ford	–	–
Qualified by owner's points
32	9	Colby Howard	CR7 Motorsports	Chevrolet	–	–
33	56	Timmy Hill	Hill Motorsports	Toyota	–	–
34	45	Lawless Alan	Niece Motorsports	Chevrolet	–	–
35	04	Spencer Davis	Roper Racing	Ford	–	–
36	33	Chase Janes	Reaume Brothers Racing	Ford	–	–
Official qualifying results
Official starting lineup

== Race results ==
Stage 1 Laps: 30

Pos.	#	Driver	Team	Make	Pts
1	2	Nick Sanchez (R) (P)	Rev Racing	Chevrolet	10
2	4	Chase Purdy	Kyle Busch Motorsports	Chevrolet	9
3	99	Ben Rhodes (P)	ThorSport Racing	Ford	8
4	11	Corey Heim (P)	Tricon Garage	Toyota	7
5	19	Christian Eckes (P)	McAnally-Hilgemann Racing	Chevrolet	6
6	38	Zane Smith (P)	Front Row Motorsports	Ford	5
7	61	Jake Drew	Hattori Racing Enterprises	Toyota	4
8	23	Grant Enfinger (P)	GMS Racing	Chevrolet	3
9	42	Carson Hocevar (P)	Niece Motorsports	Chevrolet	2
10	98	Ty Majeski (P)	ThorSport Racing	Ford	1

Stage 2 Laps: 30

Pos.	#	Driver	Team	Make	Pts
1	42	Carson Hocevar (P)	Niece Motorsports	Chevrolet	10
2	2	Nick Sanchez (R) (P)	Rev Racing	Chevrolet	9
3	11	Corey Heim (P)	Tricon Garage	Toyota	8
4	38	Zane Smith (P)	Front Row Motorsports	Ford	7
5	23	Grant Enfinger (P)	GMS Racing	Chevrolet	6
6	19	Christian Eckes (P)	McAnally-Hilgemann Racing	Chevrolet	5
7	99	Ben Rhodes (P)	ThorSport Racing	Ford	4
8	24	Rajah Caruth (R)	GMS Racing	Chevrolet	3
9	25	Matt DiBenedetto (P)	Rackley WAR	Chevrolet	2
10	17	Taylor Gray (R)	Tricon Garage	Toyota	1

Stage 3 Laps: 74

Fin	St	#	Driver	Team	Make	Laps	Led	Status	Pts
1	8	19	Christian Eckes (P)	McAnally-Hilgemann Racing	Chevrolet	134	2	Running	51
2	16	17	Taylor Gray (R)	Tricon Garage	Toyota	134	0	Running	36
3	11	25	Matt DiBenedetto (P)	Rackley WAR	Chevrolet	134	2	Running	36
4	15	11	Corey Heim (P)	Tricon Garage	Toyota	134	40	Running	48
5	14	38	Zane Smith (P)	Front Row Motorsports	Ford	134	1	Running	44
6	17	42	Carson Hocevar (P)	Niece Motorsports	Chevrolet	134	32	Running	43
7	20	52	Stewart Friesen	Halmar Friesen Racing	Toyota	134	0	Running	30
8	2	2	Nick Sanchez (R) (P)	Rev Racing	Chevrolet	134	43	Running	48
9	21	16	Tyler Ankrum	Hattori Racing Enterprises	Toyota	134	0	Running	28
10	10	61	Jake Drew	Hattori Racing Enterprises	Toyota	134	0	Running	31
11	5	35	Jake Garcia (R)	McAnally-Hilgemann Racing	Chevrolet	134	0	Running	26
12	19	24	Rajah Caruth (R)	GMS Racing	Chevrolet	134	0	Running	28
13	9	1	Jesse Love	Tricon Garage	Toyota	134	0	Running	24
14	1	4	Chase Purdy	Kyle Busch Motorsports	Chevrolet	133	0	Running	32
15	13	5	Dean Thompson	Tricon Garage	Toyota	133	0	Running	22
16	4	51	Jack Wood (OP)	Kyle Busch Motorsports	Chevrolet	133	2	Running	21
17	12	23	Grant Enfinger (P)	GMS Racing	Chevrolet	133	4	Running	29
18	3	98	Ty Majeski (P)	ThorSport Racing	Ford	133	0	Running	20
19	32	9	Colby Howard	CR7 Motosports	Chevrolet	133	0	Running	18
20	24	32	Bret Holmes (R)	Bret Holmes Racing	Chevrolet	133	2	Running	17
21	22	41	Bayley Currey	Niece Motorsports	Chevrolet	132	0	Running	16
22	34	45	Lawless Alan	Niece Motorsports	Chevrolet	132	0	Running	15
23	23	43	Daniel Dye (R)	GMS Racing	Chevrolet	132	0	Running	14
24	33	56	Timmy Hill	Hill Motorsports	Toyota	132	0	Running	13
25	6	99	Ben Rhodes (P)	ThorSport Racing	Ford	132	2	Running	24
26	18	15	Tanner Gray	Tricon Garage	Toyota	131	4	Running	11
27	25	02	Kaden Honeycutt	Young's Motorsports	Chevrolet	131	0	Running	10
28	36	33	Chase Janes	Reaume Brothers Racing	Ford	131	0	Running	9
29	29	90	Justin Carroll	TC Motorsports	Toyota	130	0	Running	8
30	7	13	Hailie Deegan	ThorSport Racing	Ford	130	0	Running	7
31	27	12	Spencer Boyd	Young's Motorsports	Chevrolet	129	0	Running	6
32	28	20	Greg Van Alst	Young's Motorsports	Chevrolet	129	0	Running	5
33	31	88	Matt Crafton (P)	ThorSport Racing	Ford	125	0	Running	4
34	30	10	Jennifer Jo Cobb	Jennifer Jo Cobb Racing	Chevrolet	125	0	Running	3
35	26	22	Mason Maggio	AM Racing	Ford	117	0	Accident	2
36	35	04	Spencer Davis	Roper Racing	Ford	1	0	Suspension	1
Official race results

== Standings after the race ==
Drivers' Championship standings

	Pos	Driver	Points
	1	Corey Heim	3,030
	2	Christian Eckes	3,024 (-6)
	3	Grant Enfinger	3,024 (-6)
	4	Carson Hocevar	3,022 (-8)
	5	Zane Smith	3,022 (-8)
4	6	Ty Majeski	3,016 (-14)
1	7	Ben Rhodes	3,013 (-17)
1	8	Nick Sanchez	3,006 (-24)
	9	Matt DiBenedetto	2,075 (-955)
4	10	Matt Crafton	2,069 (-961)
Official driver's standings

- Note: Only the first 10 positions are included for the driver standings.

Previous race: 2023 Clean Harbors 175	NASCAR Craftsman Truck Series; 2023 season	Next race: 2023 UNOH 200
