= Austin Herzog =

American racing driver

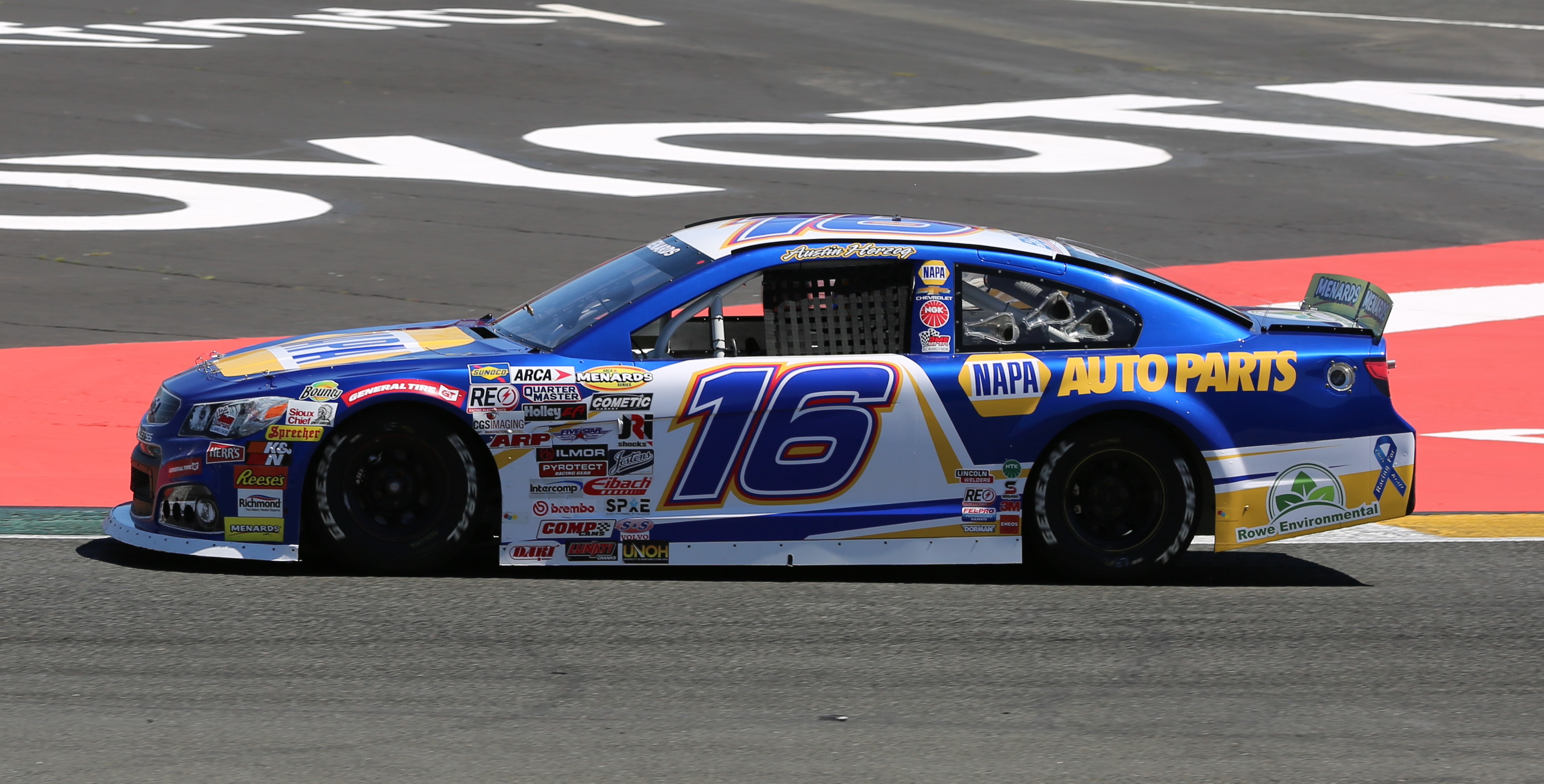
- Herzog's No. 16 ARCA car at Sonoma in 2022
- Born: Austin Herzog; August 6, 2002 (age 24); Clovis, California, U.S.

ARCA Menards Series career
- 1 race run over 1 year
- Best finish: 91st (2022)
- First race: 2022 General Tire 150 (Phoenix)
Wins	Top tens	Poles
0	0	0

ARCA Menards Series West career
- 6 races run over 2 years
- Best finish: 13th (2022)
- First race: 2018 Bakersfield 175 (Kern County)
- Last race: 2022 General Tire 200 (Sonoma)
Wins	Top tens	Poles
0	5	0
- Statistics up to date as of November 2, 2025.

Austin Herzog (born August 6, 2002) is an American professional stock car racing driver. He last competed part-time in the ARCA Menards Series West, driving the No. 16 Chevrolet SS for Bill McAnally Racing, and part-time in the ARCA Menards Series, driving the No. 16 Chevrolet SS for the same team.

== Racing career ==
=== Early career ===
Herzog would first race in 2014, at twelve years old, racing in Mini Cups. He raced there for two years, finishing third and fourth in the standings respectably. In 2016, he would make his debut in the 51FIFTY Jr. Late Model Series, getting four wins at Madera Speedway, while getting six fastest lap times. In 2017, he returned to the 51FIFTY Jr. Late Model Series, getting two more wins, and would become the winningest driver in series history. He would make more late model starts later in the season. Herzog would continue to run late model races in 2018, capturing a win at Orange Show Speedway. 2019 would be Herzog's breakout year, as he would win the 2019 Nut Up Pro Late Model Series championship. Along with that, he would get four more wins at Madera Speedway, while getting a runner-up finish in the SRL Southwest Tour.

=== ARCA Menards Series West ===
Herzog would sign with Jefferson Pitts Racing to drive for one race in the 2018 NASCAR K&N Pro Series West. He would start eleventh and finish in eighth, earning his first ever West series top ten. On January 3, 2022, Herzog signed with Bill McAnally Racing to run the full 2022 ARCA Menards Series West schedule. He would pilot the No. 16 car, replacing the 2021 West series champion Jesse Love. On June 30, 2022, it was announced that Landen Lewis would drive the No. 16 car for the remainder of the season, leaving Herzog without a ride.

== Personal life ==
Herzog was born and raised in Clovis, California. He is a class of 2020 graduate at Clovis High School. His grandfather, Richard, and father, Bryan, also both raced in late model races.

== Motorsports career results ==
=== ARCA Menards Series ===
(key) (Bold – Pole position awarded by qualifying time. Italics – Pole position earned by points standings or practice time. * – Most laps led.)

ARCA Menards Series results
Year	Team	No.	Make	1	2	3	4	5	6	7	8	9	10	11	12	13	14	15	16	17	18	19	20	AMSC	Pts	Ref
2022	Bill McAnally Racing	16	Chevy	DAY	PHO; 14	TAL	KAN	CLT	IOW	BLN	ELK	MOH	POC	IRP	MCH	GLN	ISF	MLW	DSF	KAN	BRI	SLM	TOL	91st	30	

==== ARCA Menards Series West ====
ARCA Menards Series West results
Year	Team	No.	Make	1	2	3	4	5	6	7	8	9	10	11	12	13	14	AMSWC	Pts	Ref
2018	Jefferson Pitts Racing	77	Ford	KCR; 8	TUS	TUS	OSS	CNS	SON	DCS	IOW	EVG	GTW	LVS	MER	AAS	KCR	38th	36	
2022	Bill McAnally Racing	16	Chevy	PHO; 14	IRW; 3	KCR; 8	PIR; 9	SON; 6	IRW	EVG	PIR	AAS	LVS	PHO				13th	230	
