= 2022 Salute to the Oil Industry NAPA Auto Parts 150 =

2022 NAPA Auto Parts 150
Race details
- Race 3 of 11 in the 2022 ARCA Menards Series West season
- Date: April 23, 2022
- Location: Kern County Raceway Park in Bakersfield, California
- Course: Permanent racing facility
- Course length: 0.50 miles (0.80 km)
- Distance: 150 laps, 75.00 mi (120.70 km)
- Average speed: 76.683

Pole position
Driver	P. J. Pedroncelli	Pedroncelli Motorsports
- Time: 18.624

Most laps led
Driver	P. J. Pedroncelli	Pedroncelli Motorsports
- Laps: 71

Winner
No. 42	Landen Lewis	Cook Racing Technologies

The 2022 Salute to the Oil Industry NAPA Auto Parts 150 was an ARCA Menards Series West race that was held on April 23, 2022 at Kern County Raceway Park in Bakersfield, California. It was contested over 150 laps on the 0.50-mile (0.80 km) short track. It was the third race of the 2022 ARCA Menards Series West season. Cook Racing Technologies driver Landen Lewis, in his first West Series start, collected the victory.

== Background ==
=== Entry list ===
- (R) denotes rookie driver.
- (i) denotes driver who is ineligible for series driver points.

No.	Driver	Team	Manufacturer	Sponsor
4	Sebastian Arias	Nascimento Motorsports	Toyota	Rubbermaid Commercial Production, Brady IFS, Betco
6	Jake Drew	Sunrise Ford Racing	Ford	Irwindale Speedway, Stilo USA-Offset Sport
7	Takuma Koga	Jerry Pitts Racing	Toyota	Yamada, Infra Technos
9	Tanner Reif	Sunrise Ford Racing	Ford	Vegas Fastener Mfg
11	Nick Joanides	Lowden Motorsports	Chevrolet	Blue Valor Whiskey-Stoney's Roadhouse
12	Kyle Keller	Kyle Keller Racing	Chevrolet	Third3ye, Eros Environmental, Battle Born
13	Todd Souza	Central Coast Racing	Ford	Central Coast Cabinets
16	Austin Herzog	Bill McAnally Racing	Chevrolet	NAPA Auto Parts
17	Amber Slagle	McGowan Motorsports	Chevrolet	MMI Services
31	Paul Pedroncelli	Pedroncelli Motorsports	Chevrolet	Rancho Victoria Weddings
33	P. J. Pedroncelli	Pedroncelli Motorsports	Toyota	Select Mobile Bottlers
39	Andrew Tuttle	Last Chance Racing	Chevrolet	Gearhead Coffee
42	Landen Lewis	Cook Racing Technologies	Chevrolet	19th Green, MMI Services
50	Trevor Huddleston	Huddleston Racing	Ford	High Point Racing, YouRaceLA
54	Joey Iest	Naake-Klauer Motorsports	Ford	Richwood Meats, Basila Farms
77	Tripp Gaylord	Performance P-1 Motorsports	Toyota	Jan's
88	Bridget Burgess	BMI Racing	Chevrolet	HMH Construction
99	Cole Moore	Bill McAnally Racing	Chevrolet	JM Environmental
Official entry list

== Practice/Qualifying ==
=== Starting Lineups ===
Pos	No	Driver	Team	Manufacturer	Time
1	33	P. J. Pedroncelli	Pedroncelli Motorsports	Toyota	18.624
2	13	Todd Souza	Central Coast Racing	Ford	18.626
3	42	Landen Lewis	Cook Racing Technologies	Chevrolet	18.634
4	6	Jake Drew	Sunrise Ford Racing	Ford	18.704
5	17	Amber Slagle	McGowan Motorsports	Chevrolet	18.751
6	9	Tanner Reif	Sunrise Ford Racing	Ford	18.766
7	50	Trevor Huddleston	Huddleston Racing	Ford	18.774
8	99	Cole Moore	Bill McAnally Racing	Chevrolet	18.812
9	54	Joey Iest	Naake-Klauer Motorsports	Ford	18.882
10	4	Sebastian Arias	Nascimento Motorsports	Toyota	18.911
11	16	Austin Herzog	Bill McAnally Racing	Chevrolet	18.953
12	12	Kyle Keller	Kyle Keller Racing	Chevrolet	18.993
13	88	Bridget Burgess	BMI Racing	Chevrolet	19.186
14	7	Takuma Koga	Jerry Pitts Racing	Toyota	19.219
15	39	Andrew Tuttle	Last Chance Racing	Chevrolet	19.472
16	77	Tripp Gaylord	Performance P-1 Motorsports	Toyota	19.555
17	31	Paul Pedroncelli	Pedroncelli Motorsports	Toyota	22.235
Official qualifying results

== Race ==
=== Race results ===
Pos	Grid	No	Driver	Team	Manufacturer	Laps	Points	Status
1	3	42	Landen Lewis	Cook Racing Technologies	Chevrolet	150	47	Running
2	4	6	Jake Drew	Sunrise Ford Racing	Ford	150	43	Running
3	8	99	Cole Moore	Bill McAnally Racing	Chevrolet	150	41	Running
4	6	9	Tanner Reif	Sunrise Ford Racing	Ford	150	40	Running
5	1	33	P. J. Pedroncelli	Pedroncelli Motorsports	Chevrolet	150	42	Running
6	2	13	Todd Souza	Central Coast Racing	Ford	150	38	Running
7	7	50	Trevor Huddleston	Huddleston Racing	Ford	150	37	Running
8	11	16	Austin Herzog	Bill McAnally Racing	Chevrolet	150	36	Running
9	14	7	Takuma Koga	Jerry Pitts Racing	Toyota	150	35	Running
10	5	17	Amber Slagle	McGowan Motorsports	Chevrolet	150	34	Running
11	18	11	Nick Joanides	Lowden Motorsports	Chevrolet	149	33	Running
12	13	88	Bridget Burgess	BMI Racing	Chevrolet	149	32	Running
13	10	4	Sebastian Arias	Nascimento Motorsports	Toyota	149	31	Running
14	12	12	Kyle Keller	Kyle Keller Racing	Chevrolet	148	30	Ignition
15	15	39	Andrew Tuttle	Last Chance Racing	Chevrolet	144	29	Running
16	16	77	Tripp Gaylord	Performance P-1 Motorsports	Toyota	123	28	Brakes
17	9	54	Joey Iest	Naake-Klauer Motorsports	Ford	103	27	Engine
18	17	31	Paul Pedroncelli	Pedroncelli Motorsports	Chevrolet	2	26	Vibration
Official race results

Previous race: 2022 NAPA Auto Parts 150 (March race)	ARCA Menards Series West; 2022 season	Next race: 2022 Portland 112
