= Jake Drew =

American racing driver (born 2000)

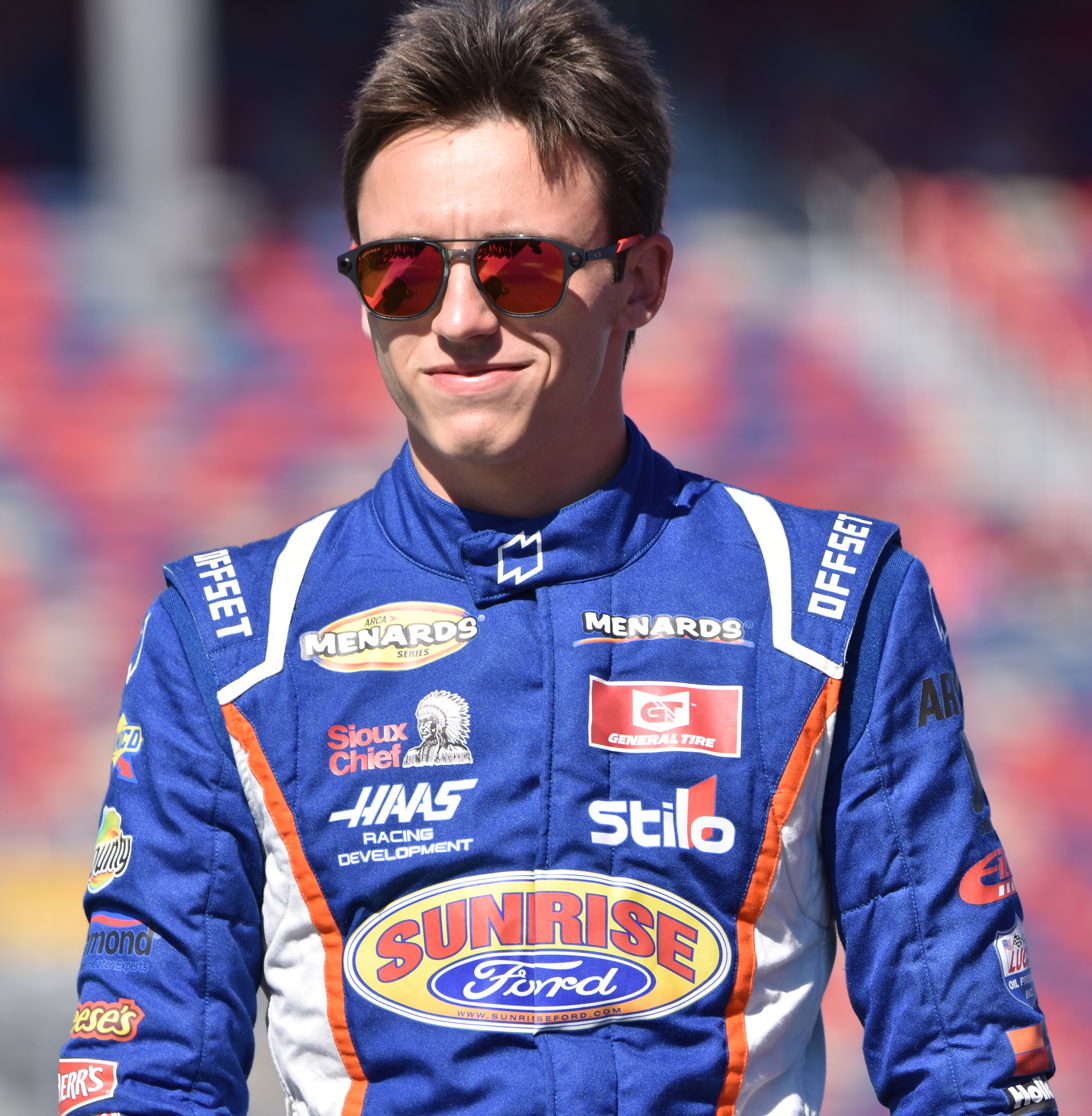
- Drew at Phoenix Raceway in 2021
- Born: Jacob Drew; March 12, 2000 (age 26); Fullerton, California, U.S.
- Achievements: 2022 ARCA Menards Series West Champion

NASCAR FedEx Freight Truck Series career
- 6 races run over 1 year
- Best finish: 31st (2023)
- First race: 2023 Rackley Roofing 200 (Nashville)
- Last race: 2023 Craftsman 150 (Phoenix)
Wins	Top tens	Poles
0	1	0

ARCA Menards Series career
- 2 races run over 2 years
- Best finish: 76th (2022)
- First race: 2021 General Tire 150 (Phoenix)
- Last race: 2022 General Tire 150 (Phoenix)
Wins	Top tens	Poles
0	1	0

ARCA Menards Series West career
- 21 races run over 3 years
- Best finish: 1st (2022)
- First race: 2021 General Tire 150 (Phoenix)
- Last race: 2023 Shasta 150 (Shasta)
- First win: 2022 Portland 112 (Portland)
- Last win: 2022 Portland 100 (Portland)
Wins	Top tens	Poles
4	17	7
- Statistics up to date as of August 12, 2024.

Jacob Drew (born March 12, 2000) is an American professional stock car racing driver. He last competed part-time in the NASCAR Craftsman Truck Series, driving the No. 66 Ford F-150 for ThorSport Racing and the No. 61 Toyota Tundra TRD Pro for Hattori Racing Enterprises, and part-time in the ARCA Menards Series West, driving the No. 41 Ford Fusion for Lowden Jackson Motorsports. He is the 2022 ARCA Menards Series West champion.

== Racing career ==
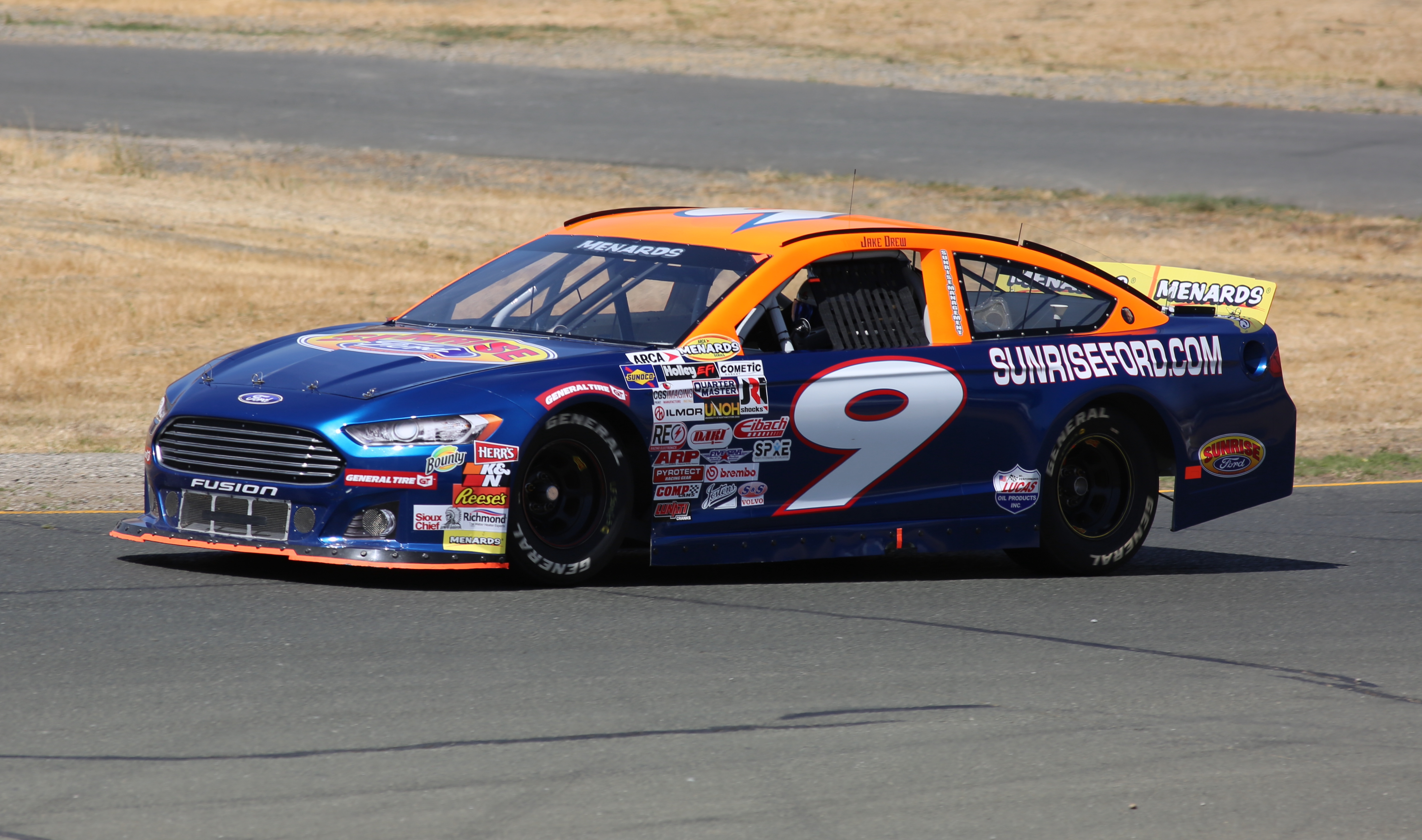
Drew on track at Sonoma Raceway in 2021

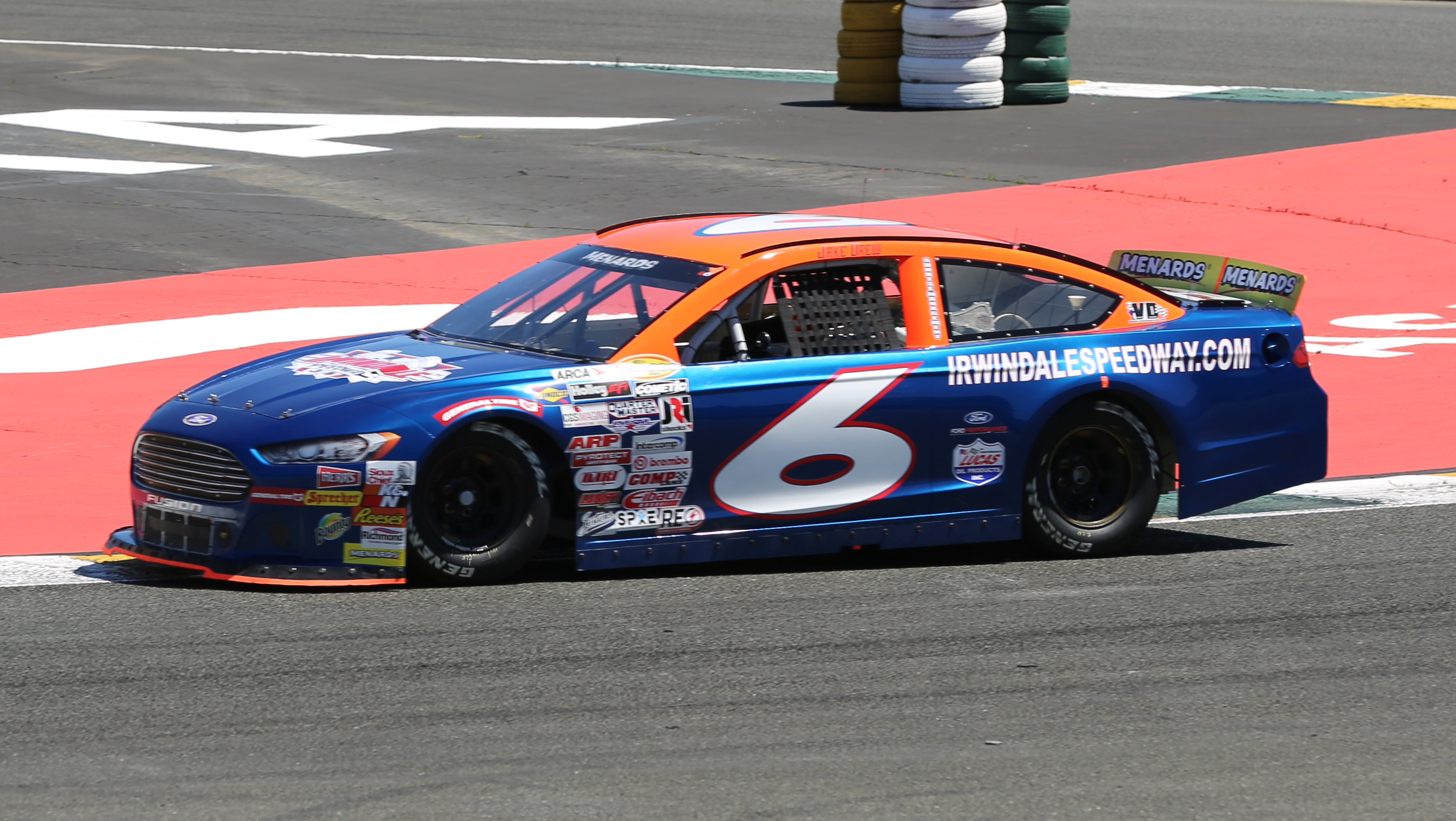
Drew's No 6 car at Sonoma Raceway in 2022.

=== ARCA Menards Series West ===
Drew made his ARCA Menards Series West debut in 2021, running full time for Sunrise Ford Racing. Drew had a phenomenal year, collecting seven top-tens, four top-fives, and three pole awards. Drew finished a best of second place at Irwindale Speedway and the Las Vegas Motor Speedway Bullring. Drew was tied for the championship with Jesse Love, however, Love won the tiebreaker, placing Drew second in the standings.

Drew returned to Sunrise Ford for another full time season in 2022, this time driving the No. 6 car. Drew would have a breakout season, earning four wins, nine top-fives, and ten top-tens, eventually winning the championship.

After SFR suspended their ARCA West operations after the season, Drew was unable to find a full-time ride for 2023. On July 12, 2023, it was announced that Drew would return to the West Series, driving the No. 41 car for Lowden Jackson Motorsports at Shasta Speedway.

=== ARCA Menards Series ===
Drew made his ARCA Menards Series debut, running in the race's paired event with the West Series at the Phoenix Raceway. Drew finished eighteenth.

=== Craftsman Truck Series ===
Drew made his debut in 2023 at Nashville Superspeedway in the No. 66 Ford, driving for ThorSport Racing where he finished in twelfth. He later made several more starts that season, driving the No. 61 Toyota for Hattori Racing Enterprises, where he had a best finish of tenth at Kansas Speedway. He has not raced since then.

== Motorsports career results ==
=== Racing career summary ===
Season	Series	Team	Races	Wins	Top 5	Top 10	Points	Position
2021	ARCA Menards Series West	Sunrise Ford Racing	9	0	4	7	438	**2nd**
2021	ARCA Menards Series	Sunrise Ford Racing	1	0	0	0	26	103rd
2022	ARCA Menards Series West	Sunrise Ford Racing	11	4	9	10	621	**1st**
2022	ARCA Menards Series	Sunrise Ford Racing	1	0	1	1	39	76th
2023	ARCA Menards Series West	Lowden Jackson Motorsports	1	0	0	0	28	54th
2023	NASCAR Craftsman Truck Series	ThorSport Racing	1	0	0	0	116	31st
2023	NASCAR Craftsman Truck Series	Hattori Racing Enterprises	5	0	0	1	116	31st

=== NASCAR ===
(key) (Bold – Pole position awarded by qualifying time. Italics – Pole position earned by points standings or practice time. * – Most laps led.)

==== Craftsman Truck Series ====
NASCAR Craftsman Truck Series results
Year	Team	No.	Make	1	2	3	4	5	6	7	8	9	10	11	12	13	14	15	16	17	18	19	20	21	22	23	NCTC	Pts	Ref
2023	ThorSport Racing	66	Ford	DAY	LVS	ATL	COA	TEX	BRD	MAR	KAN	DAR	NWS	CLT	GTW	NSH; 12	MOH	POC	RCH								31st	116	
2023	Hattori Racing Enterprises	61	Toyota																	IRP; 17	MLW	KAN; 10	BRI; 20	TAL; 20	HOM	PHO; 33	31st	116	

^{*} Season still in progress
^{1} Ineligible for series points

=== ARCA Menards Series ===
ARCA Menards Series results
Year	Team	No.	Make	1	2	3	4	5	6	7	8	9	10	11	12	13	14	15	16	17	18	19	20	AMSC	Pts	Ref
2021	Sunrise Ford Racing	9	Ford	DAY	PHO; 18	TAL	KAN	TOL	CLT	MOH	POC	ELK	BLN	IOW	WIN	GLN	MCH	ISF	MLW	DSF	BRI	SLM	KAN	103rd	26	
2022	Sunrise Ford Racing	6	Ford	DAY	PHO; 5	TAL	KAN	CLT	IOW	BLN	ELK	MOH	POC	IRP	MCH	GLN	ISF	MLW	DSF	KAN	BRI	SLM	TOL	76th	39	

==== ARCA Menards Series West ====
ARCA Menards Series West results
Year	Team	No.	Make	1	2	3	4	5	6	7	8	9	10	11	12	AMSWC	Pts	Ref
2021	Sunrise Ford Racing	9	Ford	PHO; 18	**SON**; 7	IRW; 4	CNS; 3	IRW; 2	**PIR**; 10*	**LVS**; 2	AAS; 8	PHO; 11				2nd	438	
2022	Sunrise Ford Racing	6	Ford	PHO; 5	IRW; 4	KCR; 2	PIR; 1*	**SON**; 1*	**IRW**; 1**	EVG; 2	**PIR**; 1*	**AAS**; 2	LVS; 8	PHO; 13		1st	621	
2023	Lowden Jackson Motorsports	41	Ford	PHO	IRW	KCR	PIR	SON	IRW	SHA; 16	EVG	AAS	LVS	MAD	PHO	54th	28	
