= 2022 NAPA Auto Parts 150 (March race) =

2022 NAPA Auto Parts 150 presented by West Coast Stock Car Hall of Fame
Race details
- Race 2 of 11 in the 2022 ARCA Menards Series West season
- Date: March 26, 2022
- Location: Irwindale Speedway in Irwindale, California
- Course: Permanent racing facility
- Course length: 0.80 km (0.50 miles)
- Distance: 153 laps, 76.50 mi (123.165 km)
- Scheduled distance: 150 laps, 75.00 mi (120.70 km)

Pole position
Driver	Tanner Reif	Sunrise Ford Racing
- Time: 18.436

Most laps led
Driver	Tanner Reif	Sunrise Ford Racing
- Laps: 150

Winner
No. 9	Tanner Reif	Sunrise Ford Racing

Television in the United States
- Network: USA Network
- Announcers: Charles Krall, Jessie Punch

Radio in the United States
- Radio: ARCA

The 2022 NAPA Auto Parts 150 was an ARCA Menards Series West race that was held on March 26, 2022 at Irwindale Speedway in Irwindale, California. It was contested over 153 laps on the 0.50-mile (0.80 km) short track due to an overtime finish. It was the second race of the 2022 ARCA Menards Series West season. Tanner Reif of Sunrise Ford Racing would win the race, after dominating and leading every lap. It was Reif's first career win in his second start. It was also the first win for Sunrise Ford Racing since 2020. To fill out the podium, Cole Moore and Austin Herzog of Bill McAnally Racing, would finish 2nd and 3rd, respectively.

== Background ==
=== Entry list ===
- (R) denotes rookie driver.
- (i) denotes driver who is ineligible for series driver points.

No.	Driver	Team	Manufacturer	Sponsor
04	Sarah Burgess	Nascimento Motorsports	Toyota	Rubbermaid Commercial Production, Brady IFS
4	Sebastian Arias (R)	Nascimento Motorsports	Toyota	Rubbermaid Commercial Production, Brady IFS
6	Jake Drew	Sunrise Ford Racing	Ford	Stilo USA-Offset Sport
7	Takuma Koga	Jerry Pitts Racing	Toyota	GR Garage
08	Stafford Smith**	Kart Idaho Racing	Ford	Blue Valor Whiskey-Stoney's Roadhouse
9	Tanner Reif (R)	Sunrise Ford Racing	Ford	Vegas Fastener Mfg
11	Chris Lowden (R)	Lowden Motorsports	Chevrolet	Blue Valor Whiskey-Stoney's Roadhouse
12	Kyle Keller (R)**	Kyle Keller Racing	Chevrolet	Third3ye, Eros Environmental
13	Todd Souza	Central Coast Racing	Ford	Central Coast Cabinets
16	Austin Herzog (R)	Bill McAnally Racing	Chevrolet	NAPA Auto Parts
21	Stafford Smith	Lowden Motorsports	Toyota	Blue Valor Whiskey-Stoney's Roadhouse
31	Paul Pedroncelli	Pedroncelli Motorsports	Chevrolet	Rancho Victoria Weddings
33	P. J. Pedroncelli	Pedroncelli Motorsports	Toyota	Select Mobile Bottlers
39	Andrew Tuttle**	Last Chance Racing	Chevrolet	Gearhead Coffee
50	Trevor Huddleston	Huddleston Racing	Ford	YouRaceLA
54	Joey Iest	Naake-Klauer Motorsports	Ford	Richwood Meats, Basila Farms
77	Nick Joanides	Performance P-1 Motorsports	Toyota	Jan's
86	Tim Spurgeon**	Spurgeon Motorsports	Toyota	Kleenblast
88	Bridget Burgess	BMI Racing	Chevrolet	HMH Construction
99	Cole Moore	Bill McAnally Racing	Chevrolet	BBB Industries
Official entry list

**Withdrew prior to the event

== Practice/Qualifying ==
=== Starting Lineups ===
Pos	No	Driver	Team	Manufacturer	Time
1	9	Tanner Reif (R)	Sunrise Ford Racing	Ford	18.436
2	99	Cole Moore	Bill McAnally Racing	Toyota	18.541
3	54	Joey Iest	Naake-Klauer Motorsports	Ford	18.583
4	50	Trevor Huddleston	Huddleston Racing	Ford	18.645
5	13	Todd Souza	Central Coast Racing	Ford	18.664
6	6	Jake Drew	Sunrise Ford Racing	Ford	18.749
7	33	P. J. Pedroncelli	Pedroncelli Racing	Toyota	18.761
8	16	Austin Herzog (R)	Bill McAnally Racing	Toyota	18.788
9	4	Sebastian Arias (R)	Nascimento Motorsports	Toyota	18.873
10	7	Takuma Koga	Jerry Pitts Racing	Toyota	18.885
11	88	Bridget Burgess	BMI Racing	Chevrolet	18.993
12	77	Nick Joanides	Performance P-1 Motorsports	Toyota	19.261
13	11	Chris Lowden (R)	Lowden Motorsports	Chevrolet	19.748
14	21	Stafford Smith	Lowden Motorsports	Toyota	19.767
15	04	Sarah Burgess	Nascimento Motorsports	Toyota	23.132
16	31	Paul Pedroncelli	Pedroncelli Motorsports	Chevrolet	—
Official qualifying results

== Race ==
=== Race results ===
Pos	Grid	No	Driver	Team	Manufacturer	Laps	Points	Status
1	1	9	Tanner Reif (R)	Sunrise Ford Racing	Ford	153	48	Running
2	2	99	Cole Moore	Bill McAnally Racing	Chevrolet	153	42	Running
3	8	16	Austin Herzog (R)	Bill McAnally Racing	Chevrolet	153	41	Running
4	6	6	Jake Drew	Sunrise Ford Racing	Ford	153	40	Running
5	7	33	P. J. Pedroncelli	Pedroncelli Motorsports	Toyota	153	39	Running
6	4	50	Trevor Huddleston	Huddleston Racing	Ford	153	38	Running
7	10	7	Takuma Koga	Jerry Pitts Racing	Toyota	152	37	Running
8	9	4	Sebastian Arias (R)	Nascimento Motorsports	Toyota	151	36	Running
9	5	13	Todd Souza	Central Coast Racing	Ford	149	35	Running
10	3	54	Joey Iest	Naake-Klauer Motorsports	Ford	149	34	Running
11	12	77	Nick Joanides	Performance P-1 Motorsports	Toyota	149	33	Running
12	11	88	Bridget Burgess	BMI Racing	Chevrolet	148	32	Running
13	13	11	Chris Lowden (R)	Lowden Motorsports	Chevrolet	142	31	Crash
14	14	21	Stafford Smith	Lowden Motorsports	Toyota	73	30	Steering
15	15	31	Paul Pedroncelli	Pedroncelli Motorsports	Chevrolet	2	29	Brakes
16	16	04	Sarah Burgess	Nascimento Motorsports	Toyota	0	28	Did Not Start
Official race results

Previous race: 2022 General Tire 150 (Phoenix)	ARCA Menards Series West; NAPA Auto Parts 150 (March race)	Next race: 2022 Salute to the Oil Industry NAPA Auto Parts 150
