= 2022 General Tire 150 (Phoenix) =

2022 ARCA Menards Series

Race details
- Race 2 of 20 of the 2022 ARCA Menards Series; Race 1 of 11 of the 2022 ARCA Menards Series West; Race 1 of 10 of the 2022 Sioux Chief Showdown
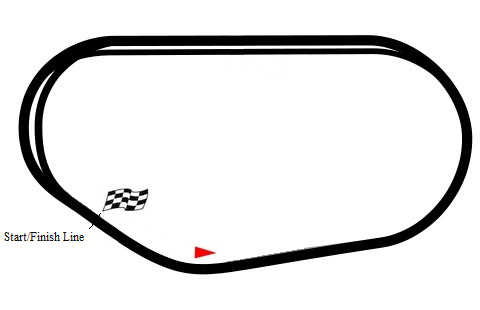
- Date: March 11, 2022
- Official name: Third Annual General Tire 150
- Location: Avondale, Arizona, Phoenix Raceway
- Course: Permanent racing facility
- Course length: 1 miles (1.6 km)
- Distance: 154 laps, 157 mi (253 km)
- Scheduled distance: 150 laps, 150 mi (240 km)
- Average speed: 86.409 mph (139.062 km/h)

Pole position
Driver	Sammy Smith	Kyle Busch Motorsports
- Time: 26.912

Most laps led
Driver	Sammy Smith	Kyle Busch Motorsports
- Laps: 79

Winner
No. 17	Taylor Gray	David Gilliland Racing

Television in the United States
- Network: MAVTV
- Announcers: Krista Voda, Jim Tretow

Radio in the United States
- Radio: Motor Racing Network

The 2022 General Tire 150 was the second stock car race of the 2022 ARCA Menards Series, the first race of the 2022 ARCA Menards Series West and the 2022 Sioux Chief Showdown, and the third iteration of the event. The race was held on Friday, March 11, 2022, in Avondale, Arizona at Phoenix Raceway, a 1-mile (1.6 km) permanent low-banked tri-oval race track. The race was run over 154 laps due to an overtime finish. Taylor Gray of David Gilliland Racing would win the race after leading 43 laps. This was Gray's first career ARCA Menards Series win and his fourth career west series win. It was an emotional win, as Gray dedicated it to Steven Stotts, the DGR hauler driver who was killed following an accident in Longview, Texas, on March 8. To fill out the podium, Daniel Dye of GMS Racing and Sammy Smith of Kyle Busch Motorsports would finish 2nd and 3rd, respectively.

== Background ==
Phoenix Raceway is a 1-mile, low-banked tri-oval race track located in Avondale, Arizona, near Phoenix. The motorsport track opened in 1964 and currently hosts two NASCAR race weekends annually. Phoenix Raceway has also hosted the CART, IndyCar Series, USAC and the WeatherTech SportsCar Championship. The raceway is currently owned and operated by NASCAR.

=== Entry list ===
#	Driver	Team	Make	Sponsor
01	Tim Monroe	Fast Track Racing	Chevrolet	Fast Track High Performance Driving School
2	Nick Sanchez	Rev Racing	Chevrolet	Universal Technical Institute
03	Alex Clubb	Clubb Racing Inc.	Ford	Clubb Racing Inc.
4	Sebastian Arias (R)	Nascimento Motorsports	Toyota	Rubbermaid Commercial Production, Brady IFS
6	Jake Drew	Sunrise Ford Racing	Ford	Sunrise Ford
07	Brian Kaltreider	Kaltreider Motorsports	Ford	Kaltreider Motorsports
7	Takuma Koga	Jerry Pitts Racing	Toyota	Rise Up
9	Tanner Reif (R)	Sunrise Ford Racing	Ford	Vegas Fastener Manufacturing, Sunrise Ford
10	Zachary Tinkle	Fast Track Racing	Toyota	Wayne Peterson Racing, Fast Track Racing
11	Bryce Haugeberg	Fast Track Racing	Chevrolet	Magnum Contracting
12	D. L. Wilson	Fast Track Racing	Chevrolet	Leggott Trailers of Waco
13	Todd Souza	Central Coast Racing	Ford	Central Coast Cabinets
15	Parker Chase	Venturini Motorsports	Toyota	Vertical Bridge
16	Austin Herzog (R)	Bill McAnally Racing	Chevrolet	NAPA Auto Parts
17	Taylor Gray	David Gilliland Racing	Ford	Ford Performance
17W	Josh Berry	McGowan Motorsports	Chevrolet	MMI Services
18	Sammy Smith	Kyle Busch Motorsports	Toyota	TMC Transportation
19	Derek Kraus	Bill McAnally Racing	Chevrolet	NAPA AutoCare
20	Jesse Love (R)	Venturini Motorsports	Toyota	Crescent Tools
21	Chris Lowden	Lowden Motorsports	Chevrolet	Stoney's Roadhouse, Blue Valor Whiskey
23	Connor Mosack	Bret Holmes Racing	Chevrolet	Nic Tailor Custom Underwear
25	Toni Breidinger (R)	Venturini Motorsports	Toyota	HairClub
27	Bobby Hillis Jr.	Fierce Creature Racing	Chevrolet	First Impression Press
30	Amber Balcaen (R)	Rette Jones Racing	Ford	ICON Direct
31	Paul Pedroncelli	Pedroncelli Motorsports	Chevrolet	Rancho Victoria Weddings
33	P. J. Pedroncelli	Pedroncelli Motorsports	Toyota	Select Mobile Bottlers
35	Greg Van Alst	Greg Van Alst Motorsports	Ford	CB Fabricating
39	Andrew Tuttle	Last Chance Racing	Chevrolet	Gearhead Coffee
42	Christian Rose	Cook Racing Technologies	Toyota	Visit West Virginia
43	Daniel Dye (R)	GMS Racing	Chevrolet	GMS Racing
48	Brad Smith	Brad Smith Motorsports	Chevrolet	Copraya.com
54	Joey Iest	Naake-Klauer Motorsports	Ford	Richwood Meats, Basila Farms
61	Rajah Caruth (R)	Rev Racing	Chevrolet	Max Siegel Inc.
66	Eric Rhead	66 Rhead Racing	Chevrolet	66 Rhead Racing
70	Kyle Keller (R)	Kyle Keller Racing	Chevrolet	Third3ye, Eros Environmental
77	Nick Joanides**	Performance P-1 Motorsports	Toyota	Jan's, Wallace Sign
85	Ryan Roulette	Last Chance Racing	Toyota	Bellator Recruiting Academy
86	Tim Spurgeon	Spurgeon Motorsports	Toyota	Davids Racing Products
88	Bridget Burgess	BMI Racing	Chevrolet	HMH Construction
99	Cole Moore	Bill McAnally Racing	Chevrolet	BBB Industries
Official entry list

**Withdrew prior to the event.

== Practice/Qualifying ==
Practice and qualifying was combined into one 60-minute session, with a driver's fastest time counting as their qualifying time. The session was held on Friday, March 11, at 2:00 PM MST.

Sammy Smith of Kyle Busch Motorsports scored the pole for the race with a time of 26.912 seconds and a speed of 133.769 mph (215.280 km/h).

Pos.	#	Driver	Team	Make	Time	Speed
1	18	Sammy Smith	Kyle Busch Motorsports	Toyota	26.912	133.769
2	17	Taylor Gray	David Gilliland Racing	Ford	27.090	132.890
3	20	Jesse Love (R)	Venturini Motorsports	Toyota	27.153	132.582
4	2	Nick Sanchez	Rev Racing	Chevrolet	27.220	132.256
5	23	Connor Mosack	Bret Holmes Racing	Chevrolet	27.292	131.907
6	43	Daniel Dye (R)	GMS Racing	Chevrolet	27.331	131.719
7	61	Rajah Caruth (R)	Rev Racing	Chevrolet	27.426	131.262
8	15	Parker Chase	Venturini Motorsports	Toyota	27.611	130.383
9	6	Jake Drew	Sunrise Ford Racing	Ford	27.660	130.152
10	25	Toni Breidinger (R)	Venturini Motorsports	Toyota	27.776	129.608
11	17W	Josh Berry	McGowan Motorsports	Chevrolet	27.777	129.604
12	54	Joey Iest	Naake-Klauer Motorsports	Ford	27.826	129.375
13	13	Todd Souza	Central Coast Racing	Ford	27.912	128.977
14	19	Derek Kraus	Bill McAnally Racing	Chevrolet	28.181	127.746
15	33	P. J. Pedroncelli	Pedroncelli Motorsports	Toyota	28.208	127.623
16	16	Austin Herzog (R)	Bill McAnally Racing	Chevrolet	28.276	127.316
17	9	Tanner Reif (R)	Sunrise Ford Racing	Ford	28.413	126.703
18	86	Tim Spurgeon	Spurgeon Motorsports	Toyota	28.456	126.511
19	99	Cole Moore	Bill McAnally Racing	Chevrolet	28.464	126.476
20	7	Takuma Koga	Jerry Pitts Racing	Toyota	28.530	126.183
21	35	Greg Van Alst	Greg Van Alst Motorsports	Ford	28.553	126.081
22	42	Christian Rose	Cook Racing Technologies	Toyota	28.755	125.196
23	10	Zachary Tinkle	Fast Track Racing	Toyota	28.794	125.026
24	70	Kyle Keller (R)	Kyle Keller Racing	Chevrolet	29.118	123.635
25	30	Amber Balcaen (R)	Rette Jones Racing	Ford	29.238	123.127
26	4	Sebastian Arias	Nascimento Motorsports	Toyota	29.319	122.787
27	88	Bridget Burgess	Burgess Motorsports	Chevrolet	29.321	122.779
28	12	D. L. Wilson	Fast Track Racing	Chevrolet	29.877	120.494
29	66	Eric Rhead	Jones Racing	Chevrolet	30.727	117.161
30	85	Ryan Roulette	Last Chance Racing	Toyota	30.738	117.119
31	21	Chris Lowden	Lowden Motorsports	Ford	30.919	116.433
32	01	Tim Monroe	Fast Track Racing	Chevrolet	31.250	115.200
33	39	Andrew Tuttle	Last Chance Racing	Chevrolet	31.993	112.525
34	11	Bryce Haugeberg	Fast Track Racing	Toyota	32.148	111.982
35	48	Brad Smith	Brad Smith Motorsports	Chevrolet	32.312	111.414
36	27	Bobby Hillis Jr.	Fierce Creature Racing	Chevrolet	35.145	102.433
37	31	Paul Pedroncelli	Pedroncelli Motorsports	Chevrolet	43.809	82.175
38	03	Alex Clubb	Clubb Racing Inc.	Ford	—	—
39	07	Brian Kaltreider	Kaltreider Motorsports	Ford	—	—
Withdrew
40	77	Nick Joanides	Performance P-1 Motorsports	Toyota	—	—
Official qualifying results

== Race results ==
Fin.	St	#	Driver	Team	Make	Laps	Led	Status	Pts
1	2	17	Taylor Gray	David Gilliland Racing	Ford	154	43	Running	47
2	6	43	Daniel Dye (R)	GMS Racing	Chevrolet	154	32	Running	43
3	1	18	Sammy Smith	Kyle Busch Motorsports	Toyota	154	79	Running	44
4	7	61	Rajah Caruth (R)	Rev Racing	Chevrolet	154	0	Running	40
5	9	6	Jake Drew	Sunrise Ford Racing	Ford	154	0	Running	39
6	3	20	Jesse Love (R)	Venturini Motorsports	Toyota	154	0	Running	38
7	4	2	Nick Sanchez	Rev Racing	Chevrolet	154	0	Running	37
8	11	17W	Josh Berry	McGowan Motorsports	Chevrolet	154	0	Running	36
9	14	19	Derek Kraus	Bill McAnally Racing	Chevrolet	154	0	Running	35
10	5	23	Connor Mosack	Bret Holmes Racing	Chevrolet	154	0	Running	34
11	19	99	Cole Moore	Bill McAnally Racing	Chevrolet	154	0	Running	33
12	13	13	Todd Souza	Central Coast Racing	Ford	154	0	Running	32
13	12	54	Joey Iest	Naake-Klauer Motorsports	Ford	154	0	Running	31
14	16	16	Austin Herzog (R)	Bill McAnally Racing	Chevrolet	154	0	Running	30
15	10	25	Toni Breidinger (R)	Venturini Motorsports	Toyota	154	0	Running	29
16	17	9	Tanner Reif (R)	Sunrise Ford Racing	Ford	154	0	Running	28
17	15	33	P. J. Pedroncelli	Pedroncelli Motorsports	Toyota	153	0	Running	27
18	20	7	Takuma Koga	Jerry Pitts Racing	Toyota	151	0	Running	26
19	18	86	Tim Spurgeon	Spurgeon Motorsports	Toyota	150	0	Running	25
20	8	15	Parker Chase	Venturini Motorsports	Toyota	147	0	Running	24
21	38	03	Alex Clubb	Clubb Racing Inc.	Ford	145	0	Running	23
22	30	85	Ryan Roulette	Last Chance Racing	Toyota	144	0	Running	22
23	27	88	Bridget Burgess	Burgess Motorsports	Chevrolet	142	0	Running	21
24	28	12	D. L. Wilson	Fast Track Racing	Chevrolet	133	0	Running	20
25	26	4	Sebastian Arias	Nascimento Motorsports	Toyota	126	0	Running	19
26	31	27	Bobby Hillis Jr.	Fierce Creature Racing	Chevrolet	124	0	Running	18
27	22	42	Christian Rose	Cook Racing Technologies	Toyota	109	0	Accident	17
28	33	11	Bryce Haugeberg	Fast Track Racing	Chevrolet	89	0	Clutch	16
29	23	10	Zachary Tinkle	Fast Track Racing	Toyota	81	0	Engine	15
30	25	30	Amber Balcaen (R)	Rette Jones Racing	Ford	56	0	Accident	14
31	34	21	Chris Lowden	Lowden Motorsports	Chevrolet	54	0	Accident	13
32	24	70	Kyle Keller (R)	Kyle Keller Racing	Chevrolet	45	0	Accident	12
33	35	01	Tim Monroe	Fast Track Racing	Chevrolet	42	0	Brakes	11
34	36	48	Brad Smith	Brad Smith Motorsports	Chevrolet	35	0	Overheating	10
35	37	39	Andrew Tuttle	Last Chance Racing	Chevrolet	26	0	Vibration	9
36	21	35	Greg Van Alst	Greg Van Alst Motorsports	Ford	11	0	Handling	8
37	39	07	Brian Kaltreider	Kaltreider Motorsports	Ford	2	0	Suspension	7
38	32	31	Paul Pedroncelli	Pedroncelli Motorsports	Chevrolet	1	0	Handling	6
39	29	66	Eric Rhead	Jones Racing	Chevrolet	0	0	DNS	5
Official race results

== Standings after the race ==
Drivers' Championship standings

	Pos	Driver	Points
2	1	Daniel Dye	84
9	2	Rajah Caruth	73 (-11)
1	3	Parker Chase	66 (-18)
5	4	Toni Breidinger	64 (-20)
15	5	Nick Sanchez	61 (-23)
5	6	Corey Heim	49 (-35)
	7	Taylor Gray	47 (-37)
	8	Sammy Smith	44 (-40)
7	9	Amber Balcaen	42 (-42)
6	10	Sean Corr	41 (-43)

- Note: Only the first 10 positions are included for the driver standings.

Previous race: 2022 Lucas Oil 200	ARCA Menards Series; 2022 season	Next race: 2022 General Tire 200 (Talladega)

Previous race: 2021 Arizona Lottery 100	ARCA Menards Series West; 2022 season	Next race: 2022 NAPA Auto Parts 150 (March race)
