= Alex Quarterley =

American racing driver

- Born: December 11, 1993 (age 32); Westfield, Massachusetts, U.S.

ARCA Menards Series career
- 2 races run over 2 years
- Best finish: 95th (2024)
- First race: 2024 General Tire 100 at The Glen (Watkins Glen)
- Last race: 2026 Lime Rock Park ARCA 100 (Lime Rock)
Wins	Top tens	Poles
0	0	0

ARCA Menards Series West career
- 1 race run over 1 year
- Best finish: 56th (2026)
- First race: 2026 Portland 112 (Portland)
Wins	Top tens	Poles
0	1	0
- Statistics up to date as of November 2, 2026.

Alexander Quarterley (born December 11, 1993) is an American professional stock car racing driver and crew chief who last worked for Mullins Racing as the crew chief of their No. 3 Ford in the ARCA Menards Series driven by Willie Mullins. As a driver, he last competed part-time in the ARCA Menards Series for his family team, 1/4 Ley Racing. He is the son of fellow racing driver Dale Quarterley.

== Racing career ==
Quarterley has previously competed in series such as the PASS North Super Late Model Series, the PASS National Championship Super Late Model Series, the Carolina Pro Late Model Series, and the Granite State Pro Stock Series.

In 2024, it was revealed that Quarterley would make his debut in the ARCA Menards Series at Watkins Glen International, driving the No. 3 Chevrolet for his father Dale's team, 1/4 Ley Racing. After placing seventeenth in the lone practice session, he qualified in seventeenth and finished two laps down in eighteenth.

Quarterley crew chiefed Mullins Racing's No. 3 car in the 2026 ARCA season opener at Daytona driven by team owner Willie Mullins.

== Motorsports results ==
=== ARCA Menards Series ===
(key) (Bold – Pole position awarded by qualifying time. Italics – Pole position earned by points standings or practice time. * – Most laps led.)

ARCA Menards Series results
Year	Team	No.	Make	1	2	3	4	5	6	7	8	9	10	11	12	13	14	15	16	17	18	19	20	AMSC	Pts	Ref
2024	1/4 Ley Racing	3	Chevy	DAY	PHO	TAL	DOV	KAN	CLT	IOW	MOH	BLN	IRP	SLM	ELK	MCH	ISF	MLW	DSF	GLN; 18	BRI	KAN	TOL	95th	26	
2026	1/4 Ley Racing	3	Chevy	DAY	PHO	KAN	TAL	GLN	TOL	MCH	POC	BER	ELK	CHI	LRP; 21	IRP	IOW	ISF	MAD	DSF	SLM	BRI	KAN	114th	23	

==== ARCA Menards Series West ====
ARCA Menards Series West results
Year	Team	No.	Make	1	2	3	4	5	6	7	8	9	10	11	12	13	AMSWC	Pts	Ref
2026	1/4 Ley Racing	32	Chevy	KER	PHO	TUC	SHA	CNS	TRI	SON	PIR; 8	AAS	MAD	LVS	PHO	KER	56th	36	
