= Mia Lovell =

American racing driver (born 2007)

- Lovell at Madera Speedway in 2026
- Born: January 29, 2007 (age 19); China

ARCA Menards Series career
- 1 race run over 1 year
- ARCA no., team: No. TBA (Nitro Motorsports)
- Best finish: 128th (2026)
- First race: 2026 General Tire 150 (Phoenix)
Wins	Top tens	Poles
0	0	0

ARCA Menards Series West career
- 13 races run over 1 year
- ARCA West no., team: No. TBA (Nitro Motorsports)
- Best finish: 7th (2026)
- First race: 2026 Oil Workers 150 presented by the West Coast Stock Car Motorsports Hall of Fame (Bakersfield)
- Last race: 2026 NAPA Auto Parts 150 (Bakersfield)
Wins	Top tens	Poles
0	7	1
- Statistics up to date as of November 2, 2026.

Mia Lovell (born January 29, 2007) is a Chinese-born American professional auto racing driver. She competes full-time in the ARCA Menards Series West and part-time in the ARCA Menards Series, driving a Toyota for Nitro Motorsports.

== Early life ==
Lovell was born in China, where she spent the first seven months of her life in an orphanage before being adopted by her parents and moving to the United States.

At the age of five, Lovell began a career in skateboarding, where she spent the next several years competing in regional and semi-pro competitions. When skateboarding competitions were cancelled due to the COVID-19 pandemic, she began accompanying her father at a nearby club track, Apex Racing Club, where she watched her father drive cars at the facility. This led to her turning laps in a car at the facility as well and ultimately led her to pursue a career in racing.

== Racing career ==
Lovell first began racing in 2023, where she ran in the Toyota Gazoo Racing GR Cup North America, driving for Smooge Racing. She earned one top-ten finish at Sebring International Raceway and won the GR Cup Overall Fastest Female award for the year. She returned to the series the following year, where she drove for Copeland Motorsports. That year, she earned six top-ten finishes and won the GR Cup Overall Fastest Female award for the second year in a row. It was during that year where she raced in Legends Cars in the INEX Series' Silver State Road Course Series.

In 2025, Lovell moved to the Trans-Am Series, where she drove for Nitro Motorsports in the TA2 class. She finished in the top-ten in the majority of races she participated in and won Rookie of the Year honors in the Western Division. She also ran select late model races with Sigma Performance Services, including making two starts in the CARS Pro Late Model Tour.

Lovell's No. 15 car at All American Speedway in 2026

In 2026, it was announced that Lovell would drive full-time in the ARCA Menards Series West, driving the No. 15 Toyota for Nitro Motorsports. She finished seventh in the final points standings with three top-five finishes, including two second place finishes, seven top-tens, and one pole position at the season ending race at Kevin Harvick's Kern Raceway.

On November 19, 2026, it was announced that Lovell will once again run a full schedule for Nitro in the West Series whilst also running select races in the main ARCA series.

== Personal life ==
Lovell attended and graduated from Phoenix Country Day high school in Phoenix, Arizona before moving to Charlotte, North Carolina to attend Davidson College.

== Motorsports results ==
=== Stock car career summary ===
Season	Series	Team	Races	Wins	Top 5	Top 10	Points	Position
2025	CARS Pro Late Model Tour	SPS Racing	2	0	0	1	66	29th
2026	ARCA Menards Series West	Nitro Motorsports	13	0	3	7	529	7th
2026	ARCA Menards Series	Nitro Motorsports	1	0	0	0	14	128th

=== ARCA Menards Series ===
(key) (Bold – Pole position awarded by qualifying time. Italics – Pole position earned by points standings or practice time. * – Most laps led. ** – All laps led.)

ARCA Menards Series results
Year	Team	No.	Make	1	2	3	4	5	6	7	8	9	10	11	12	13	14	15	16	17	18	19	20	AMSC	Pts	Ref
2026	Nitro Motorsports	15	Toyota	DAY	PHO; 30	KAN	TAL	GLN	TOL	MCH	POC	BER	ELK	CHI	LRP	IRP	IOW	ISF	MAD	DSF	SLM	BRI	KAN	128th	14	

==== ARCA Menards Series West ====
ARCA Menards Series West results
Year	Team	No.	Make	1	2	3	4	5	6	7	8	9	10	11	12	13	AMSWC	Pts	Ref
2026	Nitro Motorsports	15	Toyota	KER; 12	PHO; 30	TUC; 8	SHA; 9	CNS; 6	TRI; 3	SON; 2	PIR; 11	AAS; 18	MAD; 13	LVS; 23	PHO; 8	**KER**; 2	7th	578	

=== CARS Pro Late Model Tour ===
(key)

CARS Pro Late Model Tour results
Year	Team	No.	Make	1	2	3	4	5	6	7	8	9	10	11	12	13	CPLMTC	Pts	Ref
2025	SPS Racing	40	Chevy	AAS	CDL	OCS	ACE	NWS	CRW	HCY	HCY	AND	FLC	SBO; 11	TCM; 8	NWS	29th	66	
