= Bryce Applegate =

American racing driver

- Born: February 23, 2006 (age 20) Simpsonville, Kentucky, U.S.

CARS Late Model Stock Tour career
- Debut season: 2023
- Years active: 2023–present
- Starts: 11
- Championships: 0
- Wins: 0
- Poles: 0
- Best finish: 24th in 2025

ARCA Menards Series career
- 2 races run over 1 year
- Best finish: 77th (2026)
- First race: 2026 General Tire 200 (Daytona)
- Last race: 2026 LiUNA! 150 (IRP)
| Wins | Top tens | Poles |
|---|---|---|
| 0 | 0 | 0 |

ARCA Menards Series East career
- 1 race run over 1 year
- Best finish: 69th (2026)
- First race: 2026 LiUNA! 150 (IRP)
| Wins | Top tens | Poles |
|---|---|---|
| 0 | 0 | 0 |
- Statistics up to date as of Septemnber 26, 2026.

Andrew "Bryce" Applegate (born February 23, 2006) is an American professional stock car racing driver. He last competed part-time in the ARCA Menards Series, driving the No. 3/34 Chevrolet/Ford for Mullins Racing.

Applegate first began racing at the age of ten, and is a protégé and development driver to NASCAR driver Josh Williams and Josh Williams Motorsports.

In 2026, it was revealed that Applegate would participate in the pre-season test for the ARCA Menards Series at Daytona International Speedway, driving the No. 3 Chevrolet for Mullins Racing, where he set the 34th quickest time between the two sessions held. A month later, it was announced that he will attempt to make his debut at Daytona, driving the No. 34 for Mullins in collaboration with VWV Racing.

Applegate has also competed in series such as the SEST Limited Late Models Series, the Southeast Legends Tour, the All-Pro Limited Late Model Series, and the NASCAR Weekly Series.

== Motorsports results ==
=== ARCA Menards Series ===
(key) (Bold – Pole position awarded by qualifying time. Italics – Pole position earned by points standings or practice time. * – Most laps led.)

ARCA Menards Series results
| Year | Team | No. | Make | 1 | 2 | 3 | 4 | 5 | 6 | 7 | 8 | 9 | 10 | 11 | 12 | 13 | 14 | 15 | 16 | 17 | 18 | 19 | 20 | AMSC | Pts | Ref |
|---|---|---|---|---|---|---|---|---|---|---|---|---|---|---|---|---|---|---|---|---|---|---|---|---|---|---|
| 2026 | Mullins Racing | 34 | Chevy | DAY; 13 | PHO | KAN | TAL | GLN | TOL | MCH | POC | BER | ELK | CHI | LRP | | | | | | | | | 77th | 44 | |
| 2026 | Mullins Racing | 3 | Ford | | | | | | | | | | | | | IRP; 31 | IOW | ISF | MAD | DSF | SLM | BRI | KAN | 77th | 44 | |

==== ARCA Menards Series East ====
ARCA Menards Series East results
| Year | Team | No. | Make | 1 | 2 | 3 | 4 | 5 | 6 | 7 | 8 | AMSEC | Pts | Ref |
|---|---|---|---|---|---|---|---|---|---|---|---|---|---|---|
| 2026 | Mullins Racing | 3 | Ford | HCY | CAR | NSV | TOL | IRP; 31 | FRS | IOW | BRI | 69th | 13 | |

=== CARS Late Model Stock Car Tour ===
(key) (Bold – Pole position awarded by qualifying time. Italics – Pole position earned by points standings or practice time. * – Most laps led. ** – All laps led.)

CARS Late Model Stock Car Tour results
| Year | Team | No. | Make | 1 | 2 | 3 | 4 | 5 | 6 | 7 | 8 | 9 | 10 | 11 | 12 | 13 | 14 | 15 | 16 | 17 | CLMSCTC | Pts | Ref |
|---|---|---|---|---|---|---|---|---|---|---|---|---|---|---|---|---|---|---|---|---|---|---|---|
| 2023 | N/A | 45A | Chevy | SNM | FLC | HCY | ACE | NWS | LGY | DOM | CRW | HCY | ACE | TCM | WKS | AAS | SBO | TCM; 25 | CRW | | 80th | 8 | |
| 2024 | Hedgecock Racing Enterprises | 45 | Chevy | SNM; 21 | HCY; 17 | AAS; 15 | OCS; 23 | ACE; 25 | TCM; 6 | LGY; 10 | DOM; 22 | CRW; 19 | HCY | NWS | ACE | WCS | FLC | SBO | TCM | NWS | 23rd | 139 | |
| 2025 | MKM Racing Development | 47 | N/A | AAS; 26 | WCS | CDL | OCS | ACE | NWS | LGY | DOM | CRW | HCY | AND | FLC | SBO | TCM | NWS | | | 89th | 16 | |
