= Jake Bollman =

American racing driver (born 2007)

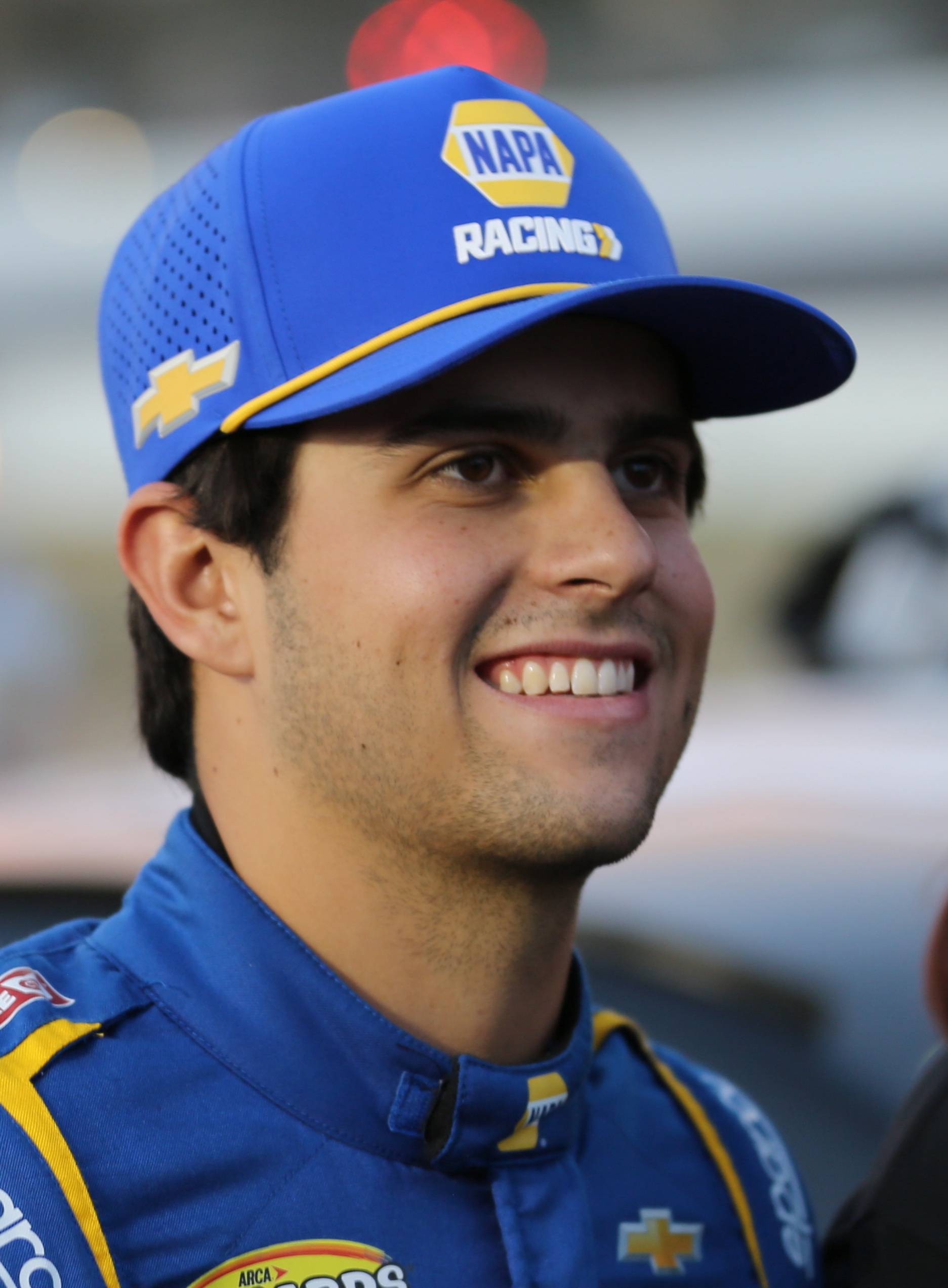
- Bollman at Madera Speedway in 2025
- Born: April 22, 2007 (age 19); Huntington Beach, California, U.S.
- Awards: 2026 ARCA Menards Series Rookie of the Year

ARCA Menards Series career
- 22 races run over 3 years
- ARCA no., team: No. 70 (Nitro Motorsports)
- Best finish: 2nd (2026)
- First race: 2024 General Tire 150 (Phoenix)
- Last race: 2026 Menards 150 (Kansas)
Wins	Top tens	Poles
0	17	0

ARCA Menards Series East career
- 4 races run over 1 year
- ARCA East no., team: No. 70 (Nitro Motorsports)
- Best finish: 13th (2026)
- First race: 2026 Owens Corning 200 (Toledo)
- Last race: 2026 Bush's Best 200 (Bristol)
Wins	Top tens	Poles
0	4	0

ARCA Menards Series West career
- 11 races run over 3 years
- ARCA West no., team: No. 70 (Nitro Motorsports)
- Best finish: 8th (2025)
- First race: 2023 West Coast Stock Car Motorsports Hall of Fame 150 (Irwindale)
- Last race: 2026 General Tire 150 (Phoenix)
- First win: 2025 Colorado 150 (Colorado)
Wins	Top tens	Poles
1	7	3
- Statistics up to date as of September 25, 2026.

Jake Bollman (born April 22, 2007) is an American professional stock car racing driver. He competes full-time in the ARCA Menards Series, driving the No. 70 Toyota for Nitro Motorsports.

== Racing career ==
=== Early career ===
Bollman would start racing competitively in 2016, where he would compete in the Lucas Oil Off Road Racing Series in the J-1 and J-2 Kart classes, where he would win several races. It was also in this series where he would win the championship in 2018. In the following year, he would race in the 51-FIFTY Jr. Late Model Series at Madera Speedway for Naake-Klauer Motorsports, where he would finish fourth in the points standings in his rookie season.

In 2020, Bollman would run two races in the Rocky Mountain Legend Racing Association Series, getting a best finish of seventh on his debut at Colorado National Speedway. For the following year, he would join Rackley WAR in its late-model program at Nashville Fairgrounds Speedway. He would also run in select events in the SRL Spears Pro Late Model Series, where he would finish tenth in the points with four top-ten finishes. Bollman would be retained by Rackley WAR in 2022 for the full Pro Late Model season. It was during this year that he would get his first win in the series in the season finale, after Jackson Boone and Cole Williams collided during a late race restart with three laps to go.

=== ARCA Menards Series West ===
In 2023, it was announced that Bollman would run a partial schedule for High Point Racing in the ARCA Menards Series West, driving the No. 55 Ford, beginning at the first Irwindale Speedway event, where he would finish twelfth due to being involved in a crash midway through the race.

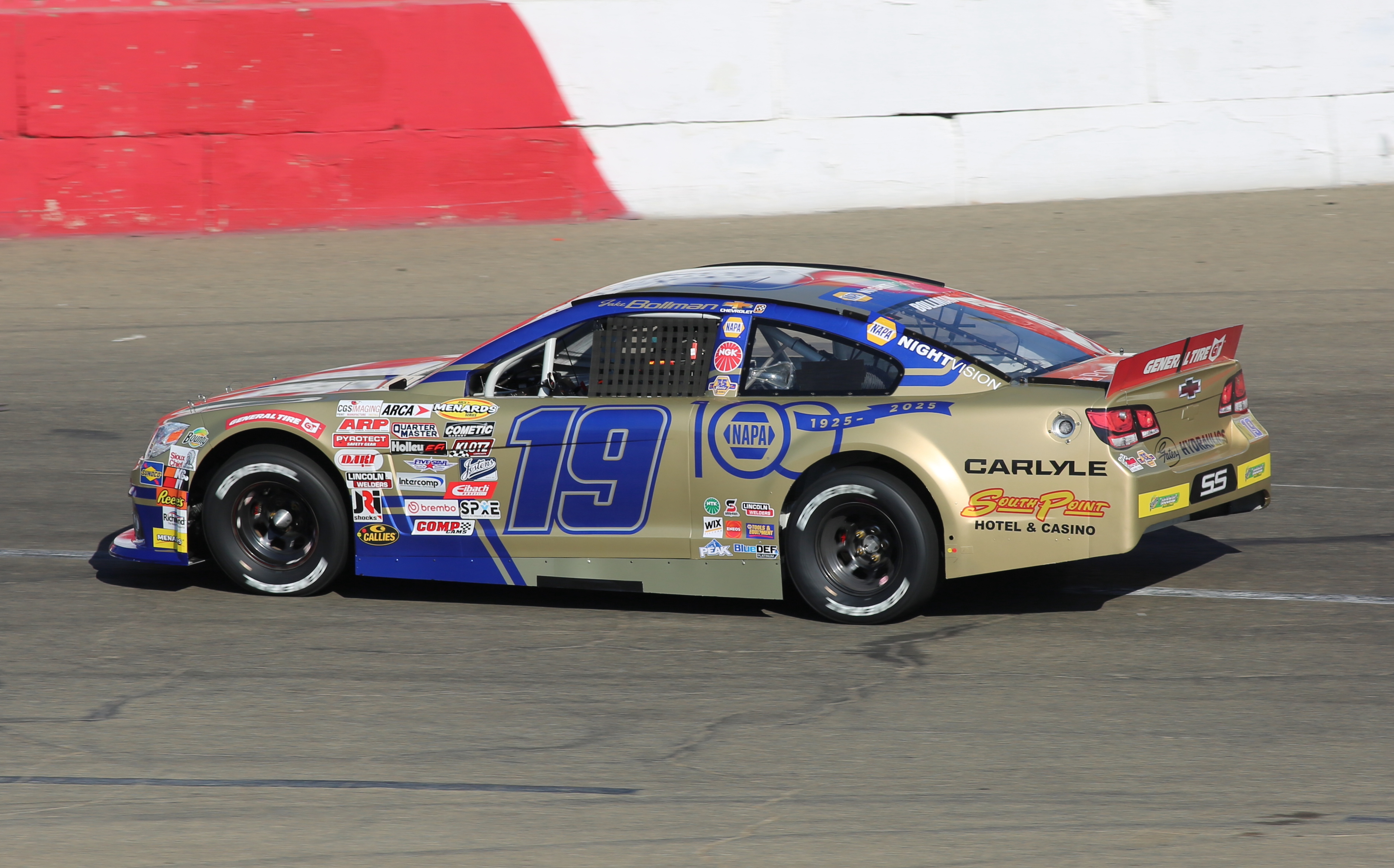
Bollman's No. 19 car at All American Speedway in 2025

On March 5, 2025, it was announced that Bollman would run a majority of the schedule for Bill McAnally Racing's No. 19 Chevrolet in the ARCA West Series, beginning at the first Phoenix Raceway event. He earned back-to-back poles at Tucson Speedway and at Colorado National Speedway, where he would earn his first career win.

=== ARCA Menards Series ===
On January 27, 2026, it was announced that Bollman will run full-time for Nitro Motorsports' No. 20 Toyota in the ARCA Menards Series. Entering the final race at Kansas, Bollman held a 16-point lead over his Nitro teammate Thomas Annunziata. Both drivers clashed with each other early in the race, which Bollman showed displeasure with Annunziata post-race after getting spun on lap 24. Bollman's championship run came to an end after being in an incident with Will Kimmel and Austin Vaughn, officially credited with a 21st place finish. Annunziata would clinch the 2026 ARCA Menards Series championship in a tiebreaker with Bollman with his win at Lime Rock Park settling the tiebreaker.

On November 10, 2026, it was announced that Bollman will remain with Nitro for the 2027 season, this time driving the No. 70.

== Motorsports career results ==
=== Racing career summary ===
Season	Series	Team	Races	Wins	Top 5	Top 10	Points	Position
2023	ARCA Menards Series West	High Point Racing	3	0	0	2	106	22nd
2024	CARS Pro Late Model Tour	Wilson Motorsports	11	1	4	8	282	7th
2024	CARS Late Model Stock Car Tour	Jake Bollman Motorsports	1	0	0	0	0	NC†
2024	ARCA Menards Series West	Naake Klauer Motorsports	1	0	0	0	13	76th
2024	ARCA Menards Series	Naake Klauer Motorsports	1	0	0	0	13	111th
2025	CARS Late Model Stock Car Tour	Jake Bollman Motorsports	6	0	0	0	159	24th
2025	CARS Late Model Stock Car Tour	Mike Darne Racing	3	0	0	0	159	24th
2025	ARCA Menards Series West	Bill McAnally Racing	7	1	3	4	255	8th
2025	ARCA Menards Series	Bill McAnally Racing	1	0	0	0	20	128th
2026	CARS Late Model Stock Car Tour	Vandyke Racing Performance	7	0	1	2	168	21st
2026	ARCA Menards Series West	Nitro Motorsports	1	0	0	1	38	53rd
2026	ARCA Menards Series East	Nitro Motorsports	4	0	2	4	156	13th
2026	ARCA Menards Series	Nitro Motorsports	20	0	12	18	947	**2nd**

^{†} As Bollman was a guest driver, he was ineligible for championship points.

=== ARCA Menards Series ===
(key) (Bold – Pole position awarded by qualifying time. Italics – Pole position earned by points standings or practice time. * – Most laps led. ** – All laps led.)

ARCA Menards Series results
Year	Team	No.	Make	1	2	3	4	5	6	7	8	9	10	11	12	13	14	15	16	17	18	19	20	AMSC	Pts	Ref
2024	Naake Klauer Motorsports	88	Ford	DAY	PHO; 31	TAL	DOV	KAN	CLT	IOW	MOH	BLN	IRP	SLM	ELK	MCH	ISF	MLW	DSF	GLN	BRI	KAN	TOL	111th	13	
2025	Bill McAnally Racing	19	Chevy	DAY	PHO; 24	TAL	KAN	CLT	MCH	BLN	ELK	LRP	DOV	IRP	IOW	GLN	ISF	MAD	DSF	BRI	SLM	KAN	TOL	128th	20	
2026	Nitro Motorsports	20	Toyota	DAY; 2	PHO; 6	KAN; 3	TAL; 18	GLN; 10	TOL; 4	MCH; 2	POC; 4	BER; 3	ELK; 2	CHI; 8	LRP; 5	IRP; 7	IOW; 3	ISF; 6	MAD; 4	DSF; 2	SLM; 2	BRI; 6	KAN; 21	2nd	947	

==== ARCA Menards Series East ====
ARCA Menards Series East results
Year	Team	No.	Make	1	2	3	4	5	6	7	8	AMSEC	Pts	Ref
2026	Nitro Motorsports	20	Toyota	HCY	CAR	NSV	TOL; 4	IRP; 7	FRS	IOW; 3	BRI; 6	13th	156	

==== ARCA Menards Series West ====
ARCA Menards Series West results
Year	Team	No.	Make	1	2	3	4	5	6	7	8	9	10	11	12	13	AMSWC	Pts	Ref
2023	High Point Racing	55	Ford	PHO	IRW; 12	KCR; 7	PIR	SON	IRW; 7	SHA	EVG	AAS; Wth	LVS	MAD	PHO		22nd	106	
2024	Naake Klauer Motorsports	88	Ford	PHO; 31	KER	PIR	SON	IRW	IRW	SHA	TRI	MAD	AAS	KER	PHO		76th	13	
2025	Bill McAnally Racing	19	Chevy	KER	PHO; 24	**TUC**; 3	**CNS**; 1**	KER; 12	SON	**TRI**; 2*	PIR	AAS; 7	MAD; 16	LVS	PHO		8th	255	
2026	Nitro Motorsports	20	Toyota	KER	PHO; 6	TUC	SHA	CNS	TRI	SON	PIR	AAS	MAD	LVS	PHO	KER	53rd	38	

=== CARS Late Model Stock Car Tour ===
(key) (Bold – Pole position awarded by qualifying time. Italics – Pole position earned by points standings or practice time. * – Most laps led. ** – All laps led.)

CARS Late Model Stock Car Tour results
Year	Team	No.	Make	1	2	3	4	5	6	7	8	9	10	11	12	13	14	15	16	17	CLMSCTC	Pts	Ref
2024	Jake Bollman Motorsports	71B	Chevy	SNM	HCY	AAS	OCS	ACE	TCM	LGY	DOM	CRW	HCY	NWS	ACE	WCS	FLC	SBO	TCM	NWS; 20	N/A	0	
2025	Jake Bollman Motorsports	71	Chevy	AAS; 27	WCS; DNS	CDL; 23	OCS; 15	ACE; 24	NWS; 31	LGY	DOM	CRW									24th	159	
2025	Mike Darne Racing	16B	Chevy										HCY; 28								24th	159	
2025	Mike Darne Racing	71B	Chevy											AND; 20	FLC	SBO	TCM; 16	NWS			24th	159	
2026	Vandyke Racing Performance	71	Toyota	SNM; 28	WCS; 17	NSV; 21	CRW	ACE; Wth	LGY; 10	DOM	NWS; 3	HCY; 26	AND	FLC; 23	TCM	NPS	SBO				21st	168	

=== CARS Pro Late Model Tour ===
(key)

CARS Pro Late Model Tour results
Year	Team	No.	Make	1	2	3	4	5	6	7	8	9	10	11	12	13	CPLMTC	Pts	Ref
2024	Wilson Motorsports	24	Toyota	SNM; 19	HCY; 27	OCS; 8	ACE; 11	TCM; 1*	CRW; 8	HCY; 5	NWS; 9	ACE; 3	FLC; 2*	SBO; 9	TCM	NWS	7th	282	
