= 2026 General Tire 200 =

ARCA Menards Series race at Daytona International Speedway

Race details
- Race 1 of 20 in the 2026 ARCA Menards Series
- Date: February 14, 2026
- Location: Daytona International Speedway in Daytona Beach, Florida
- Course: Permanent racing facility
- Course length: 2.5 miles (4.0 km)
- Distance: 84 laps, 210 mi (337.932 km)
- Scheduled distance: 80 laps, 200 mi (321 km)
- Average speed: 103.562 miles per hour (166.667 km/h)

Pole position
Driver	Gus Dean	Nitro Motorsports
- Time: 49.133

Most laps led
Driver	Jake Finch	Nitro Motorsports
- Laps: 32

Fastest lap
Driver	Jack Wood	Pinnacle Racing Group
- Time: 48.435

Winner
No. 18	Gio Ruggiero	Joe Gibbs Racing

Television in the United States
- Network: FOX
- Announcers: Eric Brennan, Phil Parsons, and Austin Cindric

Radio in the United States
- Radio: MRN
- Booth announcers: Alex Hayden and Mike Bagley
- Turn announcers: Dave Moody (1 & 2), Kyle Rickey (Backstretch), and Tim Catalfamo (3 & 4)

The 2026 General Tire 200 was an ARCA Menards Series race held on Saturday, February 14, 2026, at Daytona International Speedway in Daytona Beach, Florida. Contested over 84 laps—extended from 80 laps due to an overtime finish on the 2.5-mile (4.0 km) superspeedway, it was the first race of the 2026 ARCA Menards Series season, and the 63rd running of the event.

After Jake Finch and Gus Dean, two of the dominant drivers in the race, were taken out of contention after an incident with two laps to go, Gio Ruggiero, driving for Joe Gibbs Racing, would control the lead on a one-lap shootout, and held off the rest of the field to earn his first career ARCA Menards Series win. Jake Bollman finished second, and Kole Raz finished third. Daniel Dye and Glen Reen rounded out the top five, while Jack Wood, Jason Kitzmiller, Ryan Vargas, Bobby Dale Earnhardt, and Andy Jankowiak rounded out the top ten.

== Report ==
=== Background ===
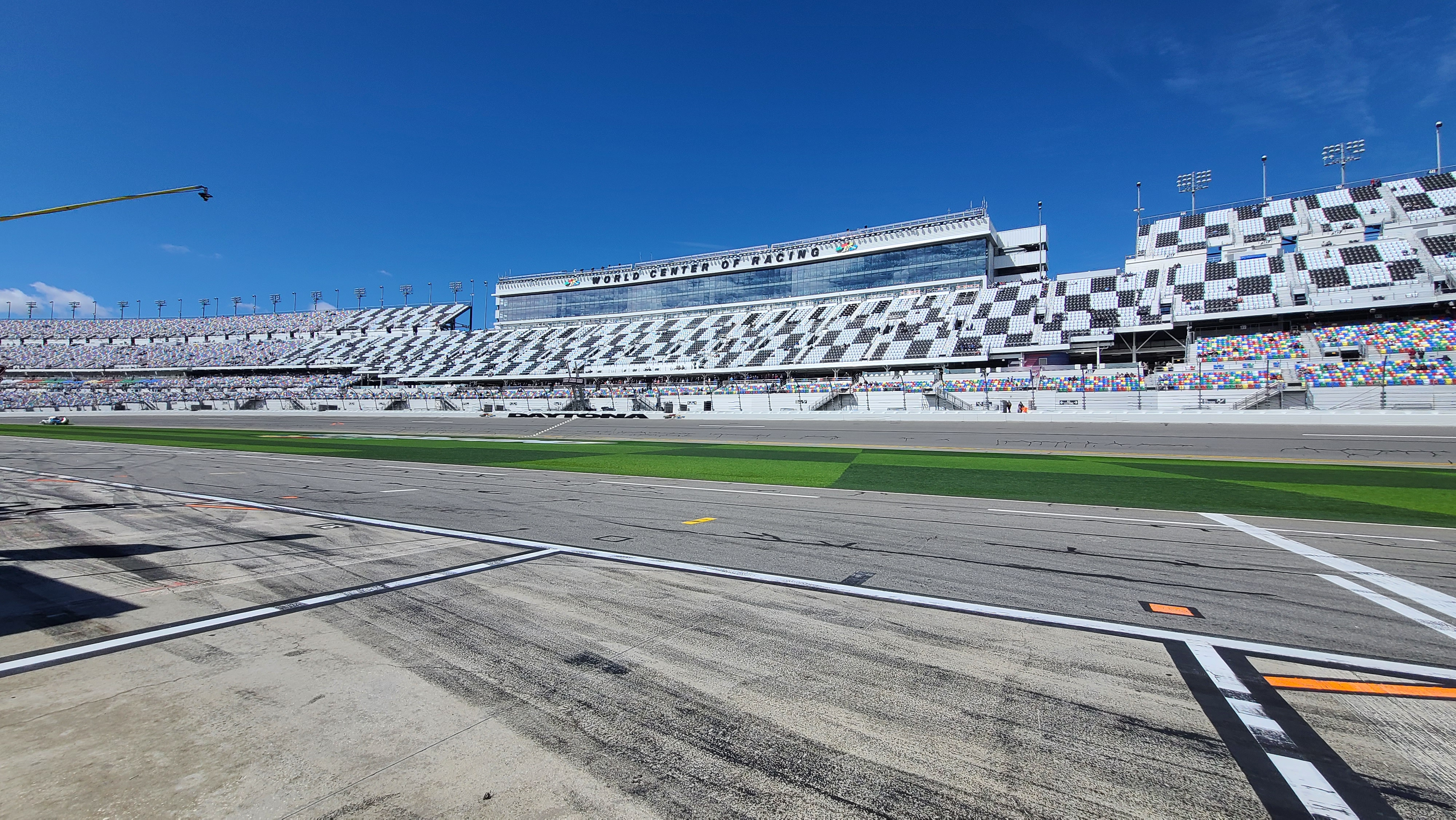
Daytona International Speedway, the track where the race will be held.

Daytona International Speedway is one of three superspeedways to hold NASCAR races, the other two being Atlanta Motor Speedway and Talladega Superspeedway. The standard track at Daytona International Speedway is a four-turn superspeedway that is 2.5 miles (4.0 km) long. The track's turns are banked at 31 degrees, while the front stretch, the location of the finish line, is banked at 18 degrees.

==== Entry list ====
- (R) denotes rookie driver.

#	Driver	Team	Make
1	Tony Cosentino	Maples Motorsports	Ford
03	Alex Clubb	Clubb Racing Inc.	Ford
3	Willie Mullins	Mullins Racing	Ford
06	Con Nicolopoulos	Wayne Peterson Motorsports	Chevrolet
07	Glen Reen	KLAS Motorsports	Ford
7	Eric Caudell	CCM Racing	Toyota
8	Sean Corr	Empire Racing	Chevrolet
9	Presley Sorah	Fast Track Racing	Ford
10	Ed Pompa	Fast Track Racing	Chevrolet
11	Bryce Haugeberg	Fast Track Racing	Toyota
12	Takuma Koga	Fast Track Racing	Toyota
15	Jake Finch	Nitro Motorsports	Toyota
17	Mini Tyrrell	Cook Racing Technologies	Chevrolet
18	Gio Ruggiero	Joe Gibbs Racing	Toyota
19	Greg Van Alst	Maples Motorsports	Chevrolet
20	Jake Bollman (R)	Nitro Motorsports	Toyota
22	Nick White	White Motorsports	Chevrolet
24	Daniel Dye	SPS Racing	Ford
25	Gus Dean	Nitro Motorsports	Toyota
26	Ron Vandermeir Jr.	Vanco Racing	Toyota
27	Tim Richmond	Tim Richmond Racing	Toyota
28	Jack Wood	Pinnacle Racing Group	Chevrolet
30	Garrett Mitchell	Rette Jones Racing	Ford
32	Charles Weslowski Jr.	Weslowski Racing	Chevrolet
34	Bryce Applegate	Mullins Racing	Chevrolet
36	Ryan Huff	Ryan Huff Motorsports	Ford
40	Andrew Patterson	Andrew Patterson Racing	Chevrolet
41	Robbie Kennealy	Jan's Towing Racing	Ford
48	Brad Smith	Brad Smith Motorsports	Ford
52	Robert Martin	Martin Racing	Toyota
55	Isabella Robusto	Nitro Motorsports	Toyota
57	Hunter Deshautelle	Brother-In-Law Racing	Chevrolet
62	Steve Lewis Jr.	Steve Lewis Racing	Chevrolet
66	Derek White	MBM Motorsports	Ford
68	Alli Owens	Kimmel Racing	Ford
69	Nolan Wilson	Kimmel Racing	Chevrolet
70	Thomas Annunziata	Nitro Motorsports	Toyota
71	Andy Jankowiak	KLAS Motorsports	Chevrolet
75	Bryan Dauzat	Brother-In-Law Racing	Chevrolet
76	Kole Raz	Rette Jones Racing	Ford
77	Taylor Reimer	Pinnacle Racing Group	Chevrolet
86	Logan Misuraca	City Garage Motorsports	Ford
88	A. J. Moyer	Moyer–Petroniro Racing	Chevrolet
89	Bobby Dale Earnhardt	Rise Racing	Chevrolet
90	Wesley Slimp	Nitro Motorsports	Toyota
91	Ryan Vargas	Maples Motorsports	Ford
93	Caleb Costner	Costner Motorsports	Chevrolet
97	Jason Kitzmiller	CR7 Motorsports	Chevrolet
98	Dale Shearer	Shearer Speed Racing	Toyota
99	Michael Maples	Maples Motorsports	Chevrolet
Official entry list

== Practice ==
The first and only practice session was held on Thursday, February 12, at 4:00 PM EST, and would last for 55 minutes.

Jake Finch, driving for Nitro Motorsports, would set the fastest time in the session, with a lap of 48.878, and a speed of 184.132 miles per hour (296.332 km/h).

=== Practice results ===
Pos.	#	Driver	Team	Make	Time	Speed
1	15	Jake Finch	Nitro Motorsports	Toyota	48.878	184.132
2	25	Gus Dean	Nitro Motorsports	Toyota	48.879	184.128
3	70	Thomas Annunziata	Nitro Motorsports	Toyota	48.889	184.090
Full practice results

== Qualifying ==
Qualifying was held on Friday, February 13, at 1:30 PM EST. The qualifying procedure used is a multi-car, multi-lap group-based system. Drivers will be split into different groups of seven to eight drivers. Each group will have four minutes to set a lap time, and the driver who sets the overall fastest lap between the groups will win the pole. The fastest 34 drivers will lock in, with the final 6 spots being reserved for provisional starters.

Gus Dean, driving for Nitro Motorsports, would score the pole for the race after setting the fastest time between the overall groups, with a lap of 49.133, and a speed of 183.176 miles per hour (294.793 km/h). Jake Bollman, who originally won the pole, was disqualified from his starting position after discovering a height violation during post-qualifying inspection.

10 drivers would fail to qualify: Ron Vandermeir Jr., Logan Misuraca, Tony Cosentino, Andrew Patterson, Greg Van Alst, Nick White, Steve Lewis Jr., Robert Martin, Nolan Wilson, and Dale Shearer.

=== Qualifying results ===
Pos.	#	Driver	Team	Make	Time	Speed
1	25	Gus Dean	Nitro Motorsports	Toyota	49.133	183.176
2	55	Isabella Robusto	Nitro Motorsports	Toyota	49.191	182.960
3	24	Daniel Dye	SPS Racing	Ford	49.235	182.797
4	8	Sean Corr	Empire Racing	Chevrolet	49.235	182.797
5	30	Garrett Mitchell	Rette Jones Racing	Ford	49.732	180.970
6	66	Derek White	MBM Motorsports	Ford	49.741	180.937
7	89	Bobby Dale Earnhardt	Rise Racing	Chevrolet	49.771	180.828
8	17	Mini Tyrrell	Cook Racing Technologies	Chevrolet	49.802	180.716
9	18	Gio Ruggiero	Joe Gibbs Racing	Toyota	49.824	180.636
10	41	Robbie Kennealy	Jan's Towing Racing	Ford	49.866	180.484
11	91	Ryan Vargas	Maples Motorsports	Ford	49.881	180.429
12	28	Jack Wood	Pinnacle Racing Group	Chevrolet	49.917	180.299
13	88	A. J. Moyer	Moyer–Petroniro Racing	Chevrolet	49.921	180.285
14	34	Bryce Applegate	Mullins Racing	Chevrolet	49.928	180.260
15	27	Tim Richmond	Tim Richmond Racing	Toyota	49.986	180.050
16	3	Willie Mullins	Mullins Racing	Ford	49.991	180.032
17	07	Glen Reen	KLAS Motorsports	Ford	50.004	179.986
18	15	Jake Finch	Nitro Motorsports	Toyota	50.013	179.953
19	7	Eric Caudell	CCM Racing	Toyota	50.014	179.950
20	36	Ryan Huff	Ryan Huff Motorsports	Ford	50.382	178.635
21	9	Presley Sorah	Fast Track Racing	Ford	50.392	178.600
22	90	Wesley Slimp	Nitro Motorsports	Toyota	50.396	178.586
23	75	Bryan Dauzat	Brother-In-Law Racing	Chevrolet	50.405	178.554
24	77	Taylor Reimer	Pinnacle Racing Group	Chevrolet	50.423	178.490
25	71	Andy Jankowiak	KLAS Motorsports	Chevrolet	50.430	178.465
26	11	Bryce Haugeberg	Fast Track Racing	Toyota	50.431	178.462
27	32	Charles Weslowski Jr.	Weslowski Racing	Chevrolet	50.438	178.437
28	57	Hunter Deshautelle	Brother-In-Law Racing	Chevrolet	50.447	178.405
29	93	Caleb Costner	Costner Motorsports	Chevrolet	50.448	178.402
30	68	Alli Owens	Kimmel Racing	Ford	50.450	178.394
31	70	Thomas Annunziata	Nitro Motorsports	Toyota	50.481	178.285
32	76	Kole Raz	Rette Jones Racing	Ford	50.536	178.091
33	10	Ed Pompa	Fast Track Racing	Chevrolet	50.568	177.978
34	99	Michael Maples	Maples Motorsports	Chevrolet	50.765	177.288
35	06	Con Nicolopoulos	Wayne Peterson Motorsports	Chevrolet	51.993	173.100
36	12	Takuma Koga	Fast Track Racing	Toyota	52.125	172.662
37	03	Alex Clubb	Clubb Racing Inc.	Ford	52.743	170.639
38	48	Brad Smith	Brad Smith Motorsports	Ford	55.784	161.337
39	20	Jake Bollman (R)	Nitro Motorsports	Toyota	–	–
40	97	Jason Kitzmiller	CR7 Motorsports	Chevrolet	–	–
Failed to qualify
41	26	Ron Vandermeir Jr.	Vanco Racing	Toyota	50.563	177.996
42	86	Logan Misuraca	City Garage Motorsports	Ford	50.573	177.961
43	1	Tony Cosentino	Maples Motorsports	Ford	50.690	177.550
44	40	Andrew Patterson	Andrew Patterson Racing	Chevrolet	50.748	177.347
45	19	Greg Van Alst	Maples Motorsports	Chevrolet	50.782	177.228
46	22	Nick White	White Motorsports	Chevrolet	50.844	177.012
47	62	Steve Lewis Jr.	Steve Lewis Racing	Chevrolet	50.876	176.901
48	52	Robert Martin	Martin Racing	Toyota	51.309	175.408
49	69	Nolan Wilson	Kimmel Racing	Chevrolet	51.661	174.213
50	98	Dale Shearer	Shearer Speed Racing	Toyota	53.746	167.454
Official qualifying results

== Race ==
=== Race results ===
Laps: 84

Fin	St	#	Driver	Team	Make	Laps	Led	Status	Pts
1	9	18	Gio Ruggiero	Joe Gibbs Racing	Toyota	84	6	Running	47
2	39	20	Jake Bollman (R)	Nitro Motorsports	Toyota	84	0	Running	42
3	32	76	Kole Raz	Rette Jones Racing	Ford	84	0	Running	41
4	3	24	Daniel Dye	SPS Racing	Ford	84	20	Running	41
5	17	07	Glen Reen	KLAS Motorsports	Ford	84	0	Running	39
6	12	28	Jack Wood	Pinnacle Racing Group	Chevrolet	84	0	Running	38
7	40	97	Jason Kitzmiller	CR7 Motorsports	Chevrolet	84	0	Running	37
8	11	91	Ryan Vargas	Maples Motorsports	Ford	84	1	Running	37
9	7	89	Bobby Dale Earnhardt	Rise Racing	Chevrolet	84	0	Running	35
10	25	71	Andy Jankowiak	KLAS Motorsports	Chevrolet	84	0	Running	34
11	5	30	Garrett Mitchell	Rette Jones Racing	Ford	84	0	Running	33
12	34	99	Michael Maples	Maples Motorsports	Chevrolet	84	0	Running	32
13	14	34	Bryce Applegate	Mullins Racing	Chevrolet	84	0	Running	31
14	13	88	A. J. Moyer	Moyer–Petroniro Racing	Chevrolet	84	0	Running	30
15	10	41	Robbie Kennealy	Jan's Towing Racing	Ford	84	0	Running	29
16	35	12	Takuma Koga	Fast Track Racing	Toyota	84	0	Running	28
17	16	3	Willie Mullins	Mullins Racing	Ford	84	0	Running	27
18	26	11	Bryce Haugeberg	Fast Track Racing	Toyota	84	0	Running	26
19	28	57	Hunter Deshautelle	Brother-In-Law Racing	Chevrolet	84	0	Running	25
20	18	15	Jake Finch	Nitro Motorsports	Toyota	84	32	Running	26
21	33	10	Ed Pompa	Fast Track Racing	Chevrolet	84	0	Running	23
22	19	7	Eric Caudell	CCM Racing	Toyota	84	0	Running	22
23	15	27	Tim Richmond	Tim Richmond Racing	Toyota	84	0	Running	21
24	27	32	Charles Weslowski Jr.	Weslowski Racing	Chevrolet	83	0	Running	20
25	38	48	Brad Smith	Brad Smith Motorsports	Ford	82	0	Running	19
26	31	70	Thomas Annunziata	Nitro Motorsports	Toyota	82	0	Running	18
27	21	9	Presley Sorah	Fast Track Racing	Ford	82	0	Running	17
28	23	75	Bryan Dauzat	Brother-In-Law Racing	Chevrolet	80	0	Running	16
29	1	25	Gus Dean	Nitro Motorsports	Toyota	79	15	Accident	17
30	24	77	Taylor Reimer	Pinnacle Racing Group	Chevrolet	79	0	Running	14
31	35	06	Con Nicolopoulos	Wayne Peterson Motorsports	Chevrolet	78	0	Running	13
32	29	93	Caleb Costner	Costner Motorsports	Chevrolet	72	0	Running	12
33	4	8	Sean Corr	Empire Racing	Chevrolet	68	0	Accident	11
34	30	68	Alli Owens	Kimmel Racing	Ford	67	0	Accident	10
35	22	90	Wesley Slimp	Nitro Motorsports	Toyota	46	0	Mechanical	9
36	37	03	Alex Clubb	Clubb Racing Inc.	Ford	44	0	Radiator	8
37	2	55	Isabella Robusto	Nitro Motorsports	Toyota	42	10	Clutch	8
38	8	17	Mini Tyrrell	Cook Racing Technologies	Chevrolet	37	0	Mechanical	6
39	6	66	Derek White	MBM Motorsports	Ford	34	0	Vibration	5
40	20	36	Ryan Huff	Ryan Huff Motorsports	Ford	0	0	Engine	4
Official race results

=== Race statistics ===
- Lead changes: 7 among 6 different drivers
- Cautions/Laps: 7 for 32 laps
- Red flags: 1
- Time of race: 2 hours, 1 minute and 40 seconds
- Average speed: 121.429 miles per hour (195.421 km/h)

== Standings after the race ==
Drivers' Championship standings

Pos	Driver	Points
1	Gio Ruggiero	47
2	Jake Bollman	42 (–5)
3	Kole Raz	41 (–6)
4	Daniel Dye	41 (–7)
5	Glen Reen	39 (–8)
6	Jack Wood	38 (–9)
7	Jason Kitzmiller	37 (–10)
8	Ryan Vargas	37 (–10)
9	Bobby Dale Earnhardt	35 (–12)
10	Andy Jankowiak	34 (–13)

- Note: Only the first 10 positions are included for the driver standings.

Previous race: 2025 Owens Corning 200	ARCA Menards Series; 2026 season	Next race: 2026 General Tire 150
