= Chase Howard =

American racing driver

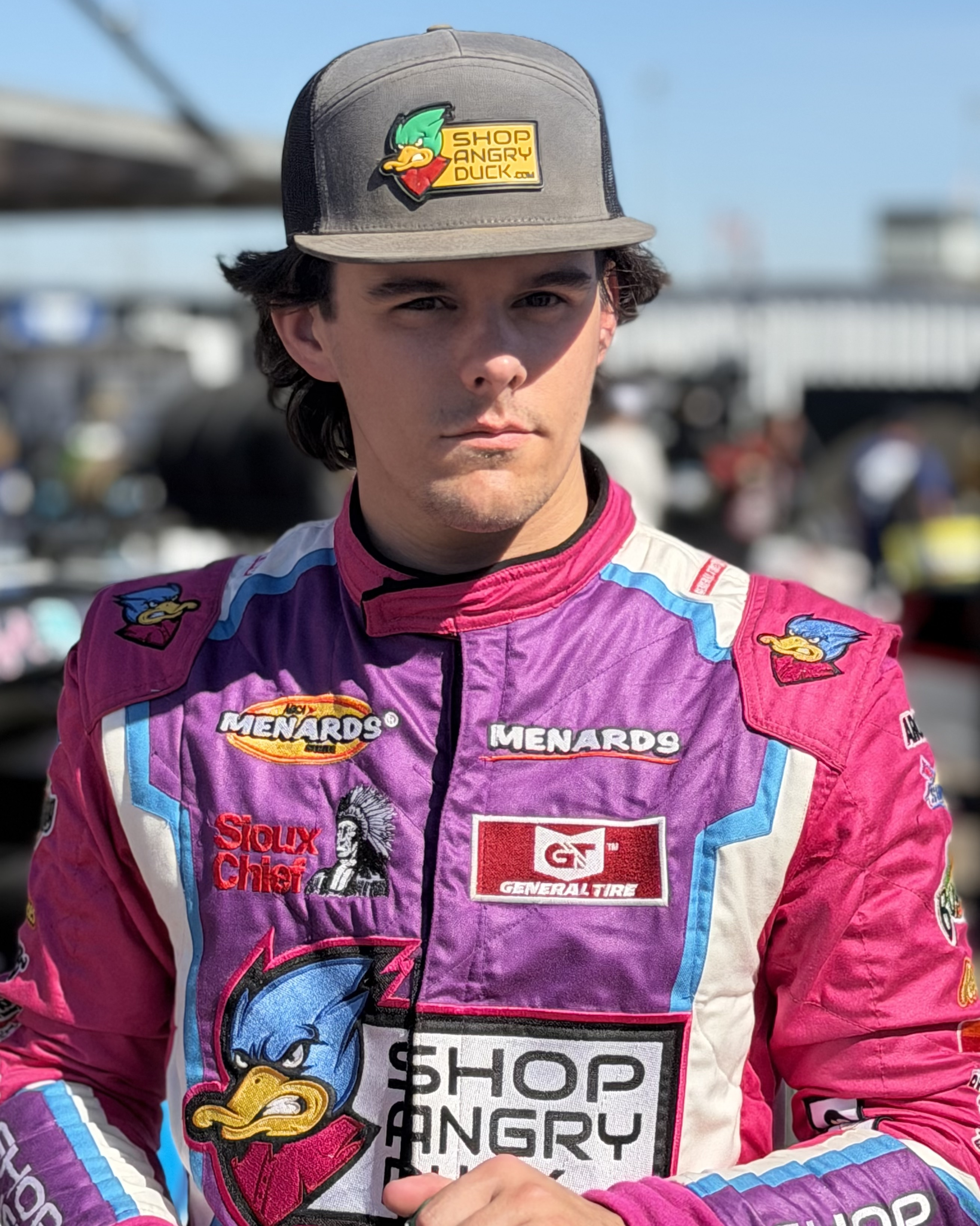
- Howard at Phoenix Raceway in 2025
- Born: November 20, 2003 (age 22); Nesbit, Mississippi, U.S.

ARCA Menards Series career
- 3 races run over 2 years
- Best finish: 67th (2025)
- First race: 2025 Southern Illinois 100 (DuQuoin)
- Last race: 2026 Audubon Park 100 (DuQuoin)
Wins	Top tens	Poles
0	2	0

ARCA Menards Series West career
- 1 race run over 1 year
- Best finish: 75th (2025)
- First race: 2025 Desert Diamond Casino West Valley 100 (Phoenix)
Wins	Top tens	Poles
0	0	0
- Statistics up to date as of September 6, 2026.

Chase Howard (born November 20, 2003) is an American professional stock car racing driver. He last competed part-time in the ARCA Menards Series, driving the No. 89 Chevrolet for Rise Racing.

== Racing career ==
Howard has previously competed in series such as the American Sprint Car Series, the United Sprint Car Series, the POWRi Lucas Oil WAR Sprint League, and the Western Iowa Non-Wing Sprints Series.

In 2025, it was revealed that Howard would make his debut in the ARCA Menards Series at the DuQuoin State Fairgrounds, driving the No. 31 Toyota for Rise Motorsports. After placing ninth in the lone practice session, he qualified in eleventh and finished on the lead lap in seventh place. Several weeks later, it was revealed that Howard would return with the team at Salem Speedway.

== Motorsports results ==
=== ARCA Menards Series ===
(key) (Bold – Pole position awarded by qualifying time. Italics – Pole position earned by points standings or practice time. * – Most laps led.)

ARCA Menards Series results
Year	Team	No.	Make	1	2	3	4	5	6	7	8	9	10	11	12	13	14	15	16	17	18	19	20	AMSC	Pts	Ref
2025	Rise Motorsports	31	Toyota	DAY	PHO	TAL	KAN	CLT	MCH	BLN	ELK	LRP	DOV	IRP	IOW	GLN	ISF	MAD	DSF; 7	BRI	SLM; 13	KAN	TOL	67th	68	
2026	Rise Racing	89	Chevy	DAY	PHO	KAN	TAL	GLN	TOL	MCH	POC	BER	ELK	CHI	LRP	IRP	IOW	ISF; Wth	MAD	DSF; 9	SLM	BRI	KAN	90th	35	

==== ARCA Menards Series West ====
ARCA Menards Series West results
Year	Team	No.	Make	1	2	3	4	5	6	7	8	9	10	11	12	AMSWC	Pts	Ref
2025	Rise Motorsports	31	Toyota	KER	PHO	TUC	CNS	KER	SON	TRI	PIR	AAS	MAD	LVS	PHO; 23	75th	21	
