= 2026 ARCA Menards Series =

74th season of the ARCA Menards Series

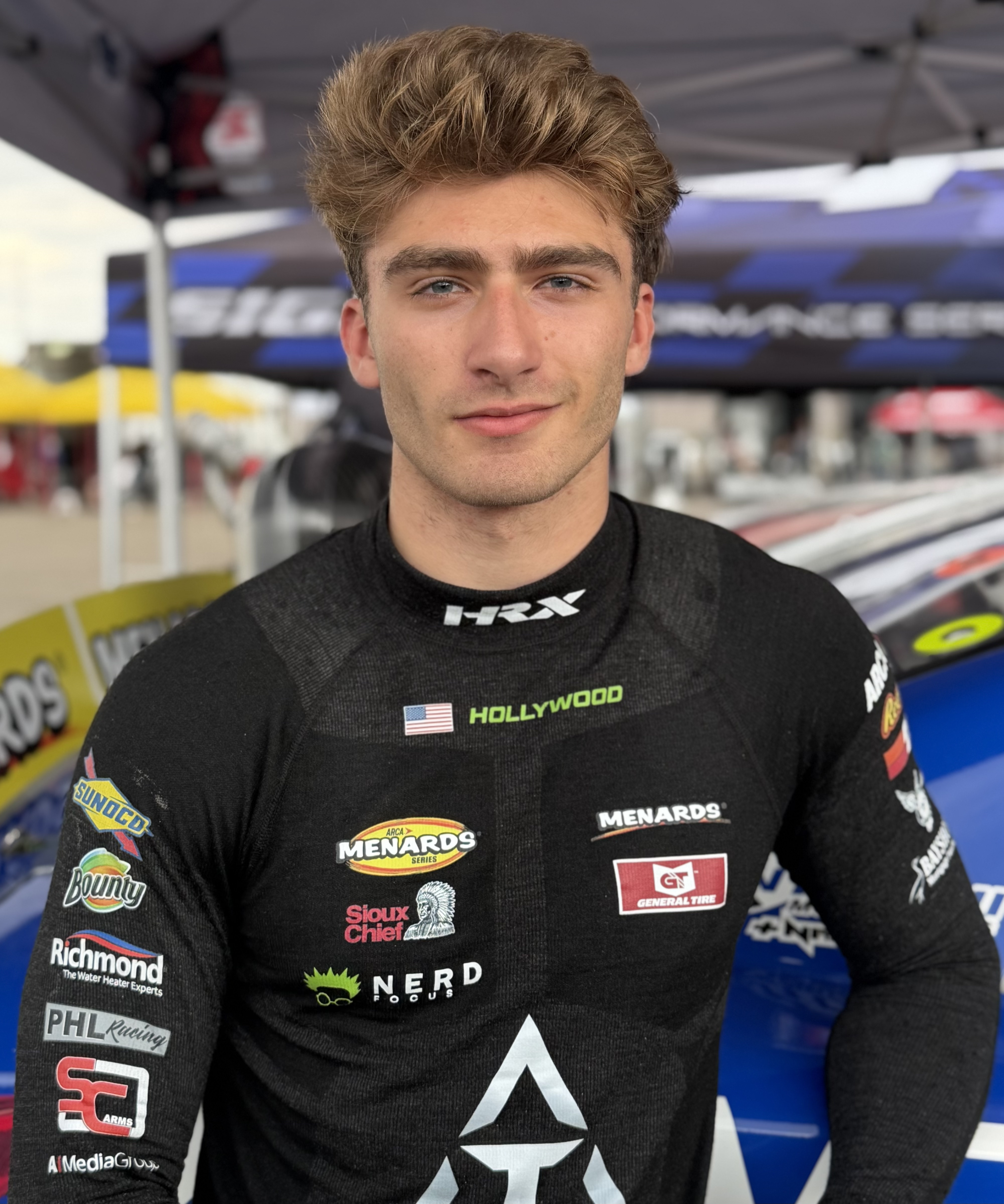
Thomas Annunziata, the 2026 ARCA Menards Series Champion by virtue of a tiebreaker.

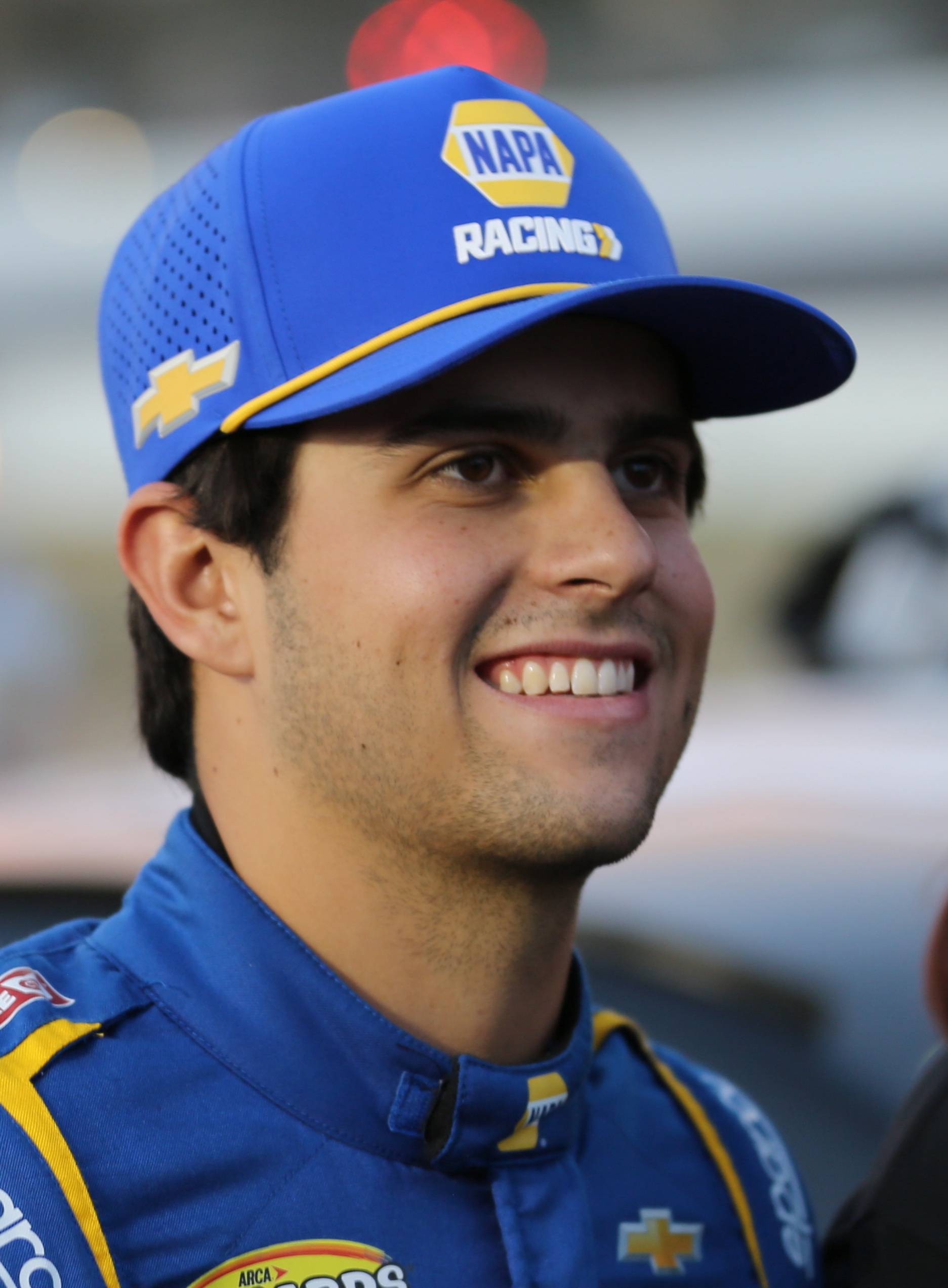
Jake Bollman, the Rookie of the Year, lost the tiebreaker to Annunziata in the championship, finishing second.

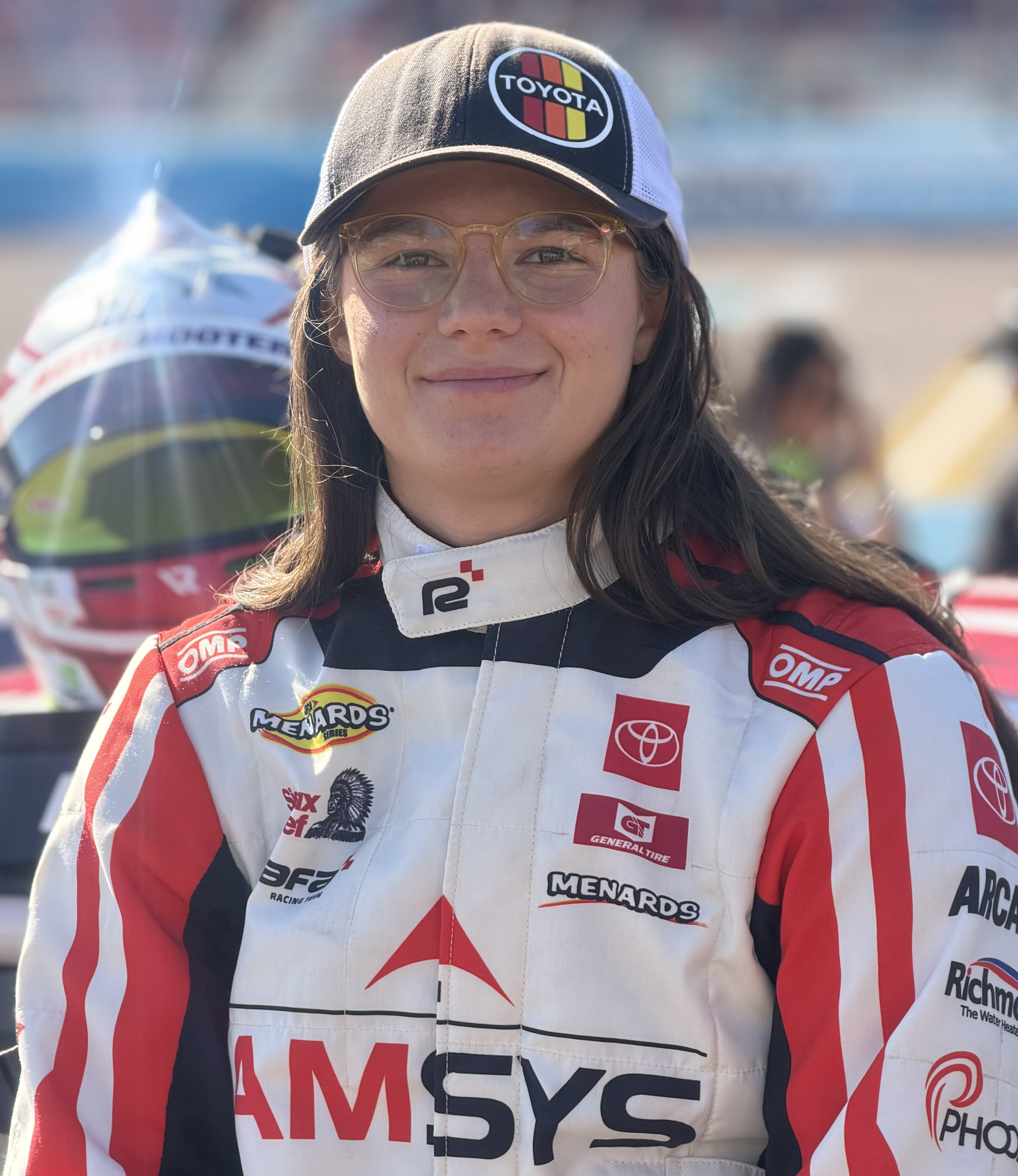
Isabella Robusto finished third in the championship.

The 2026 ARCA Menards Series was the 74th season of the ARCA Menards Series, a stock car racing series sanctioned by NASCAR in the United States. The season began at Daytona International Speedway with the General Tire 200 on February 14 and ended with the Reese's 150 at Kansas Speedway on September 25.

Brenden Queen entered the season as the defending champion, but did not return to defend his title as he moved up to the NASCAR Craftsman Truck Series full-time in 2026, driving for Kaulig Racing. In a close championship battle that went all the way down to the finale at Kansas Speedway, Thomas Annunziata won the championship over Jake Bollman by virtue of a tiebreaker, because of Annuziata's sole race win of the season giving him the title. The No. 18 Toyota of Joe Gibbs Racing won the Owner's Champsionship by just eight points over the No. 28 Chevrolet of Pinnacle Racing Group.

== Teams and drivers ==
=== Full schedule ===
Manufacturer	Team	No.	Driver	Crew chief	Ref
Chevrolet	CR7 Motorsports	97	Jason Kitzmiller 19	Frank Kimmel 16; Doug Howe 4	
Chevrolet	CR7 Motorsports	97	Landon S. Huffman 1	Frank Kimmel 16; Doug Howe 4	
Chevrolet	Maples Motorsports	99	Michael Maples	Chris Vanscoy 19; Kyle Totman 1	
Chevrolet	Pinnacle Racing Group	28	Jack Wood 3	Steven Dawson	
Chevrolet	Pinnacle Racing Group	28	Carson Brown (R) 13	Steven Dawson	
Chevrolet	Pinnacle Racing Group	28	Connor Mosack 2	Steven Dawson	
Chevrolet	Pinnacle Racing Group	28	Tyler Lupton 1	Steven Dawson	
Chevrolet	Pinnacle Racing Group	28	Landon S. Huffman 1	Steven Dawson	
Chevrolet	Pinnacle Racing Group	77	Taylor Reimer 6	Kevin Reed Jr.	
Chevrolet	Pinnacle Racing Group	77	Tristan McKee 9	Kevin Reed Jr.	
Chevrolet	Pinnacle Racing Group	77	Lanie Buice 5	Kevin Reed Jr.	
Ford	Brad Smith Motorsports	48	Brad Smith	Terry Strange 3 Rand Bitter 1 Gary Sevenans 1 Leo Kryger 2 Jeff Smith 8 Brian Pacheco 1 Dan Walden 2 Roy Knight 1 James Jacobson 1	
Ford	Clubb Racing Inc.	03	Alex Clubb	Brian Clubb	
Ford	Clubb Racing Inc.	86	Logan Misuraca 1 (Note: Entry at Daytona was fielded in a collaboration with City Garage Motorsports.)	Ryan Bell 1 Jonathan Clubb 16; Chris Porter 3	
Ford	Clubb Racing Inc.	86	Jeff Maconi (R) 19	Ryan Bell 1 Jonathan Clubb 16; Chris Porter 3	
Toyota	Fast Track Racing	12	Takuma Koga	Andrew Kiernan	
Toyota	Joe Gibbs Racing	18	Gio Ruggiero 6	Matt Ross	
Toyota	Joe Gibbs Racing	18	Max Reaves (R) 13	Matt Ross	
Toyota	Joe Gibbs Racing	18	William Sawalich 1	Matt Ross	
Toyota	Nitro Motorsports	20	Jake Bollman (R)	Doug George	
Toyota	Nitro Motorsports	25	Gus Dean 2	Shane Wilson 19; Danny Johnson 1	
Toyota	Nitro Motorsports	25	Julian DaCosta 1	Shane Wilson 19; Danny Johnson 1	
Toyota	Nitro Motorsports	25	Gavan Boschele (R) 12	Shane Wilson 19; Danny Johnson 1	
Toyota	Nitro Motorsports	25	Wesley Slimp 1	Shane Wilson 19; Danny Johnson 1	
Toyota	Nitro Motorsports	25	Will Robinson 2	Shane Wilson 19; Danny Johnson 1	
Toyota	Nitro Motorsports	25	Ty Fredrickson 1	Shane Wilson 19; Danny Johnson 1	
Toyota	Nitro Motorsports	25	Peter Portante 1	Shane Wilson 19; Danny Johnson 1	
Toyota	Nitro Motorsports	55	Isabella Robusto	Glenn Parker	
Toyota	Nitro Motorsports	70	Thomas Annunziata	Shannon Rursch	
Chevrolet 5 Ford 5 Toyota 10	Fast Track Racing	10	Ed Pompa 7	Mike Sroufe 13; Joseth Carabantes 5 Nathan Davis 2	
Chevrolet 5 Ford 5 Toyota 10	Fast Track Racing	10	Brad Perez 1	Mike Sroufe 13; Joseth Carabantes 5 Nathan Davis 2	
Chevrolet 5 Ford 5 Toyota 10	Fast Track Racing	10	Craig Pellegrini Jr. 5	Mike Sroufe 13; Joseth Carabantes 5 Nathan Davis 2	
Chevrolet 5 Ford 5 Toyota 10	Fast Track Racing	10	Dustin Hillenburg 2	Mike Sroufe 13; Joseth Carabantes 5 Nathan Davis 2	
Chevrolet 5 Ford 5 Toyota 10	Fast Track Racing	10	John Clagett 2	Mike Sroufe 13; Joseth Carabantes 5 Nathan Davis 2	
Chevrolet 5 Ford 5 Toyota 10	Fast Track Racing	10	Tim Monroe 2	Mike Sroufe 13; Joseth Carabantes 5 Nathan Davis 2	
Chevrolet 5 Ford 5 Toyota 10	Fast Track Racing	10	Tony Cosentino 1	Mike Sroufe 13; Joseth Carabantes 5 Nathan Davis 2	
Toyota 5 Chevrolet 6 Ford 9	Fast Track Racing	11	Bryce Haugeberg 3	Dick Doheny 6 Jeremy Petty 2 Mike Sroufe 6 Joseth Carabantes 5 Nathan Davis 1	
Toyota 5 Chevrolet 6 Ford 9	Fast Track Racing	11	Dustin Hillenburg 2	Dick Doheny 6 Jeremy Petty 2 Mike Sroufe 6 Joseth Carabantes 5 Nathan Davis 1	
Toyota 5 Chevrolet 6 Ford 9	Fast Track Racing	11	Robbie Kennealy 1	Dick Doheny 6 Jeremy Petty 2 Mike Sroufe 6 Joseth Carabantes 5 Nathan Davis 1	
Toyota 5 Chevrolet 6 Ford 9	Fast Track Racing	11	Trent Curtis 1	Dick Doheny 6 Jeremy Petty 2 Mike Sroufe 6 Joseth Carabantes 5 Nathan Davis 1	
Toyota 5 Chevrolet 6 Ford 9	Fast Track Racing	11	Matt Kemp 3	Dick Doheny 6 Jeremy Petty 2 Mike Sroufe 6 Joseth Carabantes 5 Nathan Davis 1	
Toyota 5 Chevrolet 6 Ford 9	Fast Track Racing	11	Tim Monroe 1	Dick Doheny 6 Jeremy Petty 2 Mike Sroufe 6 Joseth Carabantes 5 Nathan Davis 1	
Toyota 5 Chevrolet 6 Ford 9	Fast Track Racing	11	Chase Buscaglia 5	Dick Doheny 6 Jeremy Petty 2 Mike Sroufe 6 Joseth Carabantes 5 Nathan Davis 1	
Toyota 5 Chevrolet 6 Ford 9	Fast Track Racing	11	Tony Cosentino 1	Dick Doheny 6 Jeremy Petty 2 Mike Sroufe 6 Joseth Carabantes 5 Nathan Davis 1	
Toyota 5 Chevrolet 6 Ford 9	Fast Track Racing	11	Mike Basham 2	Dick Doheny 6 Jeremy Petty 2 Mike Sroufe 6 Joseth Carabantes 5 Nathan Davis 1	
Toyota 5 Chevrolet 6 Ford 9	Fast Track Racing	11	D. L. Wilson 1	Dick Doheny 6 Jeremy Petty 2 Mike Sroufe 6 Joseth Carabantes 5 Nathan Davis 1	
Ford 17 Chevrolet 3	Maples Motorsports	91	Ryan Vargas 10 (Note: Originally Vargas was scheduled to drive the No. 91 and Michael Maples was scheduled to drive the No. 99 at IRP (Race 13), however after No. 99 blew the engine in practice, Maples replaced Vargas in No. 91 in the race.)	Kyle Totman 14; Vic Kicera 1 Chris Vanscoy 1 Jeff McClure 1 Kenna Long 3	
Ford 17 Chevrolet 3	Maples Motorsports	91	Tyler Kicera 1	Kyle Totman 14; Vic Kicera 1 Chris Vanscoy 1 Jeff McClure 1 Kenna Long 3	
Ford 17 Chevrolet 3	Maples Motorsports	91	Austin Vaughn 6 (Note: Entries were fielded in a collaboration with WAV Racing.)	Kyle Totman 14; Vic Kicera 1 Chris Vanscoy 1 Jeff McClure 1 Kenna Long 3	
Ford 17 Chevrolet 3	Maples Motorsports	91	Morgen Baird 1	Kyle Totman 14; Vic Kicera 1 Chris Vanscoy 1 Jeff McClure 1 Kenna Long 3	
Ford 17 Chevrolet 3	Maples Motorsports	91	Ty Fredrickson 1	Kyle Totman 14; Vic Kicera 1 Chris Vanscoy 1 Jeff McClure 1 Kenna Long 3	
Ford 17 Chevrolet 3	Maples Motorsports	91	Michael Maples 1	Kyle Totman 14; Vic Kicera 1 Chris Vanscoy 1 Jeff McClure 1 Kenna Long 3	
Ford 17 Chevrolet 3	Maples Motorsports	91	Shawn Allen Jr. 1	Kyle Totman 14; Vic Kicera 1 Chris Vanscoy 1 Jeff McClure 1 Kenna Long 3	
Chevrolet 8 Toyota 9 Ford 3	Wayne Peterson Motorsports 18; Fierce Creature Racing 1 (Note: It was a Fierce Creature Racing entry using Wayne Peterson Motorsports's owner points.); MAN Motorsports 1 (Note: It was a MAN Motorsports entry using Wayne Peterson Motorsports's owner points.)	06	Con Nicolopoulos 4	Michael Peterson 2 Tony Huffman 1 Nate Moeller 11; Wayne Peterson 3 David Noble 1	
Chevrolet 8 Toyota 9 Ford 3	Wayne Peterson Motorsports 18; Fierce Creature Racing 1 MAN Motorsports 1	06	Bobby Hillis Jr. 1 (Note: Entry at Phoenix was fielded in a collaboration with Fierce Creature Racing.)	Michael Peterson 2 Tony Huffman 1 Nate Moeller 11; Wayne Peterson 3 David Noble 1	
Chevrolet 8 Toyota 9 Ford 3	Wayne Peterson Motorsports 18; Fierce Creature Racing 1 MAN Motorsports 1	06	Brayton Laster 4	Michael Peterson 2 Tony Huffman 1 Nate Moeller 11; Wayne Peterson 3 David Noble 1	
Chevrolet 8 Toyota 9 Ford 3	Wayne Peterson Motorsports 18; Fierce Creature Racing 1 MAN Motorsports 1	06	Nate Moeller 7	Michael Peterson 2 Tony Huffman 1 Nate Moeller 11; Wayne Peterson 3 David Noble 1	
Chevrolet 8 Toyota 9 Ford 3	Wayne Peterson Motorsports 18; Fierce Creature Racing 1 MAN Motorsports 1	06	Jackson McLerran 1 (Note: Entry at IRP was fielded in a collaboration with MAN Motorsports.)	Michael Peterson 2 Tony Huffman 1 Nate Moeller 11; Wayne Peterson 3 David Noble 1	
Chevrolet 8 Toyota 9 Ford 3	Wayne Peterson Motorsports 18; Fierce Creature Racing 1 MAN Motorsports 1	06	Ben Peterson 2	Michael Peterson 2 Tony Huffman 1 Nate Moeller 11; Wayne Peterson 3 David Noble 1	
Chevrolet 8 Toyota 9 Ford 3	Wayne Peterson Motorsports 18; Fierce Creature Racing 1 MAN Motorsports 1	06	Trenton Masters 1	Michael Peterson 2 Tony Huffman 1 Nate Moeller 11; Wayne Peterson 3 David Noble 1	
Chevrolet 8 Toyota 9 Ford 3	Wayne Peterson Motorsports 18; Fierce Creature Racing 1 MAN Motorsports 1	06	Daniel Sasnett 1	Michael Peterson 2 Tony Huffman 1 Nate Moeller 11; Wayne Peterson 3 David Noble 1	

=== Limited schedule ===
Manufacturer	Team	No.	Driver	Crew chief	Races	Ref
Chevrolet	1/4 Ley Racing	32	Dale Quarterley	Unknown	1	
Chevrolet	1/4 Ley Racing	44	Jeff Anton	Dale Quarterley 1 Greg Kelly 1	2	
Chevrolet	ACR Motorsports (Note: Entries are fielded in a collaboration with CR7 Motorsports.)	79	Isaac Kitzmiller	Doug Howe 12; Frank Kimmel 1	11	
Chevrolet	ACR Motorsports	79	Matt Kemp	Doug Howe 12; Frank Kimmel 1	1	
Chevrolet	Allgaier Motorsports	16	Kelly Kovski	Jon Hanson	2	
Chevrolet	Andrew Patterson Racing	40	Andrew Patterson	Patrick Torbett	3	
Chevrolet	Bill McAnally Racing	16	Hailie Deegan	Mario Isola	1	
Chevrolet	Bill McAnally Racing	81	Mason Massey	Ty Joiner	1	
Chevrolet	Brother-In-Law Racing	57	Hunter Deshautelle	Todd Cooper	1	
Chevrolet	Brother-In-Law Racing	75	Bryan Dauzat	Bob Rahilly	2	
Chevrolet	CK Motorsports	72	Christopher Werth	Tyler Lewis	1	
Chevrolet	Costner Motorsports	93	Caleb Costner	Unknown 1 Derek Kearns 1	1	
Chevrolet	Costner Motorsports	93	Alli Owens	Unknown 1 Derek Kearns 1	1	
Chevrolet	CR7 Motorsports	9	Landon S. Huffman	Frank Kimmel 1 Doug Howe 1	2	
Chevrolet	Empire Racing	8	Sean Corr	Dan Lorz 2 Adam Murphy 3	5	
Chevrolet	Jet Daddy Racing	00	John Kennedy	Oceana Tiner	1	
Chevrolet	KC Motorsports	81	Kevin Campbell	Mason Campbell	11	
Chevrolet	Maples Motorsports	34	Ryan Vargas (Note: Entry was fielded in a collaboration with Alpha Prime Racing.)	Dee Vaughn	1	
Chevrolet	Moyer–Petroniro Racing	88	A. J. Moyer	Kevin Ingram	2	
Chevrolet	Mullins Racing	34	Bryce Applegate	Tony Furr	1	
Chevrolet	NDS Motorsports	53	Andrew Ranger	Ben Torriere	2	
Chevrolet	Phoenix Racing	1	Jake Finch	Johnny Allen	1	
Chevrolet	Rick Ware Racing	51	Patrick Staropoli	Jeff Spraker	1	
Chevrolet	Rise Racing with Earnhardt-Shearer Racing	89	Bobby Dale Earnhardt	Matthew Wright 14; Jacob Petrowsky 3 Tim Goulet 2	15	
Chevrolet	Rise Racing with Earnhardt-Shearer Racing	89	Brayton Laster	Matthew Wright 14; Jacob Petrowsky 3 Tim Goulet 2	1	
Chevrolet	Rise Racing with Earnhardt-Shearer Racing	89	Chase Howard	Matthew Wright 14; Jacob Petrowsky 3 Tim Goulet 2	2	
Chevrolet	Rise Racing with Earnhardt-Shearer Racing	89	Quinn Davis	Matthew Wright 14; Jacob Petrowsky 3 Tim Goulet 2	1	
Chevrolet	Steve Lewis Racing	62	Steve Lewis Jr. (Note: At Talladega, it was a Steve Lewis Racing entry fielding ACR Motorsports' owner points.)	Steve Lewis Sr.	1	
Chevrolet	Steve Lewis Racing	79	Steve Lewis Jr.	Steve Lewis Sr.	1	
Chevrolet	Strike Mamba Racing	51	Tyler Tomassi	John Reaume	1	
Chevrolet	Strike Mamba Racing	72	Cody Dennison	Al Lebert	1	
Chevrolet	Weslowski Racing	32	Charles Weslowski Jr.	Tim Silva 1 Brian Finney 2	3	
Chevrolet	White Motorsports	22	Nick White	Mike Harmon 2 Drew White 2	4	
Ford	City Garage Motorsports	5	Michael Clayton	Stuart Weiss	1	
Ford	City Garage Motorsports	34	Logan Misuraca	Ryan Bell	1	
Ford	City Garage Motorsports	85	Quinn Davis	Ryan Bell	4	
Ford	Clubb Racing Inc.	83	Nate Moeller	Chris Porter 5 Jon Clubb 1	1	
Ford	Clubb Racing Inc.	83	Brayton Laster	Chris Porter 5 Jon Clubb 1	5	
Ford	Fast Track Racing	9	Presley Sorah	Joseth Carabantes 1 Nate Moeller 1	1	
Ford	Fast Track Racing	9	Nate Moeller	Joseth Carabantes 1 Nate Moeller 1	1	
Ford	High Point Racing	50	Trevor Huddleston	Jeff Schrader	1	
Ford	High Point Racing	56	Andrew Chapman	Travis Thirkettle	1	
Ford	Jan's Towing Racing with Kennealy Keller Motorsports	01	Cole Denton	Chris Greaney	1	
Ford	Jan's Towing Racing with Kennealy Keller Motorsports	41	Robbie Kennealy (Note: Entries at Daytona and Talladega were fielded in a collaboration with Fast Track Racing.)	Tim Monroe 2 Brian Kizer 1	3	
Ford	Kimmel Racing	68	Alli Owens	Will Kimmel 1 Unknown 1	1	
Ford	Kimmel Racing	68	Nate Moeller	Will Kimmel 1 Unknown 1	1	
Ford	KLAS Motorsports	07	Glen Reen	Justin Link	1	
Ford	Rette Jones Racing	0	George Siciliano	Logan Yiengst 2 Greg Zipadelli 1	3	
Ford	Rette Jones Racing	30	Garrett Mitchell	Mark Rette	4	
Ford	Rette Jones Racing	76	Kole Raz	Greg Zipadelli	1	
Ford	Ryan Huff Motorsports	36	Ryan Huff	James Huff	2	
Toyota	Central Coast Racing	13	Taylor Reimer	Michael Muñoz	1	
Toyota	Integrity Autosports	13	Rita Goulet	John Sutton 1 Brian Weber 1 Rita Goulet 1 Corrie Stott 1	2	
Toyota	Integrity Autosports	13	Brian Weber	John Sutton 1 Brian Weber 1 Rita Goulet 1 Corrie Stott 1	2	
Toyota	Jerry Pitts Racing	5	Eric Johnson Jr.	Dustin Ash	1	
Toyota	Jerry Pitts Racing	7	Gavin Ray	R. J. Johnson	1	
Toyota	MacZink Racing	65	Jeffery MacZink	Steve Peters	1	
Toyota	MAN Motorsports	95	Jackson McLerran	David Noble 2 John Burns 2	2	
Toyota	MAN Motorsports	95	Hunter Wright	David Noble 2 John Burns 2	2	
Toyota	MAN Motorsports	96	Jackson McLerran	David Noble	1	
Toyota	Martin Racing	52	Robert Martin	Jeff Spraker	1	
Toyota	MCM Racing Development	38	Esteban Rodríguez	Max Calles	2	
Toyota	MCM Racing Development	38	Gabriel Casagrande	Max Calles	1	
Toyota	Nascimento Motorsports	4	Monty Tipton	Mike Nascimento	1	
Toyota	NEMCO Motorsports	29	Ryan Gemmell	Joe Nemechek 1 Paul Chodora 1	2	
Toyota	Nitro Motorsports	15	Jake Finch	Danny Johnson 4 Ryan London 1 Mark Durgin 1 Doug Richert 6 Jeff McClure 1	2	
Toyota	Nitro Motorsports	15	Mia Lovell	Danny Johnson 4 Ryan London 1 Mark Durgin 1 Doug Richert 6 Jeff McClure 1	1	
Toyota	Nitro Motorsports	15	Jade Avedisian	Danny Johnson 4 Ryan London 1 Mark Durgin 1 Doug Richert 6 Jeff McClure 1	5	
Toyota	Nitro Motorsports	15	Sam Corry	Danny Johnson 4 Ryan London 1 Mark Durgin 1 Doug Richert 6 Jeff McClure 1	1	
Toyota	Nitro Motorsports	15	Wesley Slimp	Danny Johnson 4 Ryan London 1 Mark Durgin 1 Doug Richert 6 Jeff McClure 1	1	
Toyota	Nitro Motorsports	15	Will Robinson	Danny Johnson 4 Ryan London 1 Mark Durgin 1 Doug Richert 6 Jeff McClure 1	1	
Toyota	Nitro Motorsports	15	Ashton Higgins	Danny Johnson 4 Ryan London 1 Mark Durgin 1 Doug Richert 6 Jeff McClure 1	1	
Toyota	Nitro Motorsports	15	Landon Brown	Danny Johnson 4 Ryan London 1 Mark Durgin 1 Doug Richert 6 Jeff McClure 1	1	
Toyota	Nitro Motorsports	90	Wesley Slimp	Jeff McClure 1 Shane Wilson 1	1	
Toyota	Nitro Motorsports	90	Jade Avedisian	Jeff McClure 1 Shane Wilson 1	1	
Toyota	RAFA Racing Team	2	Kyle Steckly	Mike Tyska 2 Matthew Lucas 1	3	
Toyota	Shearer Speed Racing	98	Dale Shearer	Vincenzo Valentin 1 Jeremy Petty 7	8	
Toyota	Shockwave Motorsports	05	David Smith	Brandon Carlson	1	
Toyota	Team 36	36	Ty Fredrickson	Dan Fredrickson	2	
Toyota	Team 36 with Nitro Motorsports	90	Ty Fredrickson	George Church 1	1	
Toyota	Tim Richmond Racing	27	Tim Richmond	Adam Murphy	3	
Toyota	Tinkle Family Racing	53	Zachary Tinkle	Adam Murphy	3	
Toyota	Vanco Racing	26	Ron Vandermeir Jr.	Ron Vandermeir Sr.	2	
Toyota	WAV Racing	34	Brian Barbarow	Brad Elter	2	
Toyota	WAV Racing	34	Ivis Earley	Brad Elter	2	
Toyota 2 Chevrolet 1	CCM Racing	7	Eric Caudell	Andy Jirik 2 Eric Caudell 1	2	
Toyota 2 Chevrolet 1	CCM Racing	7	Kadence Davenport	Andy Jirik 2 Eric Caudell 1	1	
Chevrolet 2 Toyota 5	Cook Racing Technologies	17	Mini Tyrrell	Sean Samuels	1	
Chevrolet 2 Toyota 5	Cook Racing Technologies	17	Taylor Mayhew	Sean Samuels	1	
Chevrolet 2 Toyota 5	Cook Racing Technologies	17	Monty Tipton	Sean Samuels	2	
Chevrolet 2 Toyota 5	Cook Racing Technologies	17	Kaden Honeycutt	Sean Samuels	3	
Chevrolet 2 Toyota 5	Cook Racing Technologies	17	Stewart Friesen	Sean Samuels	1	
Chevrolet 5 Toyota 1	Cook Racing Technologies	42	Jaiden Reyna	Travis Sharpe 1 Alexis Penninger 2 Sean Samuels 3	1	
Chevrolet 5 Toyota 1	Cook Racing Technologies	42	Dawson Sutton	Travis Sharpe 1 Alexis Penninger 2 Sean Samuels 3	1	
Chevrolet 5 Toyota 1	Cook Racing Technologies	42	Taylor Mayhew	Travis Sharpe 1 Alexis Penninger 2 Sean Samuels 3	3	
Chevrolet 5 Toyota 1	Cook Racing Technologies	42	Mike Christopher Jr.	Travis Sharpe 1 Alexis Penninger 2 Sean Samuels 3	1	
Ford 2 Toyota 3	Fast Track Racing	01	D. L. Wilson	Andy Hillenburg 1 Joseth Carabantes 2 George Church 1 Jeremy Petty 1	1	
Ford 2 Toyota 3	Fast Track Racing	01	Cody Dennison	Andy Hillenburg 1 Joseth Carabantes 2 George Church 1 Jeremy Petty 1	1	
Ford 2 Toyota 3	Fast Track Racing	01	Craig Pellegrini Jr.	Andy Hillenburg 1 Joseth Carabantes 2 George Church 1 Jeremy Petty 1	1	
Ford 2 Toyota 3	Fast Track Racing	01	Graham Jacobson	Andy Hillenburg 1 Joseth Carabantes 2 George Church 1 Jeremy Petty 1	1	
Ford 2 Toyota 3	Fast Track Racing	01	Tony Musolino	Andy Hillenburg 1 Joseth Carabantes 2 George Church 1 Jeremy Petty 1	1	
Chevrolet 1 Ford 6 Toyota 1	Kimmel Racing	69	Nolan Wilson	Bill Kimmel	1	
Chevrolet 1 Ford 6 Toyota 1	Kimmel Racing	69	Will Kimmel	Bill Kimmel	5	
Chevrolet 1 Ford 6 Toyota 1	Kimmel Racing	69	Landon Brown	Bill Kimmel	2	
Chevrolet 7 Toyota 4 Ford 1	KLAS Motorsports	71	Andy Jankowiak	Mike Dayton	12	
Ford 1 Chevrolet 5	Maples Motorsports	1	Tony Cosentino	Jay Shaffer 1 Kenna Long 1 Collin Flueckiger 3 Patrick Torbett 1	2	
Ford 1 Chevrolet 5	Maples Motorsports	1	Nate Moeller	Jay Shaffer 1 Kenna Long 1 Collin Flueckiger 3 Patrick Torbett 1	1	
Ford 1 Chevrolet 5	Maples Motorsports	1	Andrew Patterson (Note: It was an Andrew Patterson Racing entry fielding Maples Motorsports' owner points.)	Jay Shaffer 1 Kenna Long 1 Collin Flueckiger 3 Patrick Torbett 1	1	
Ford 1 Chevrolet 5	Maples Motorsports	1	Andrew Rocque	Jay Shaffer 1 Kenna Long 1 Collin Flueckiger 3 Patrick Torbett 1	1	
Ford 1 Chevrolet 5	Maples Motorsports	1	Kenna Long	Jay Shaffer 1 Kenna Long 1 Collin Flueckiger 3 Patrick Torbett 1	1	
Chevrolet 8 Ford 5	Maples Motorsports	19	Greg Van Alst	Jim Long 1 Nigel Bannister 1 Kenna Long 7 John Szulczewski 2 Collin Flueckiger 1 Kyle Totman 1	1	
Chevrolet 8 Ford 5	Maples Motorsports	19	Zachary Tinkle	Jim Long 1 Nigel Bannister 1 Kenna Long 7 John Szulczewski 2 Collin Flueckiger 1 Kyle Totman 1	1	
Chevrolet 8 Ford 5	Maples Motorsports	19	Matt Kemp	Jim Long 1 Nigel Bannister 1 Kenna Long 7 John Szulczewski 2 Collin Flueckiger 1 Kyle Totman 1	3	
Chevrolet 8 Ford 5	Maples Motorsports	19	Corey Aiken	Jim Long 1 Nigel Bannister 1 Kenna Long 7 John Szulczewski 2 Collin Flueckiger 1 Kyle Totman 1	2	
Chevrolet 8 Ford 5	Maples Motorsports	19	Austin Vaughn	Jim Long 1 Nigel Bannister 1 Kenna Long 7 John Szulczewski 2 Collin Flueckiger 1 Kyle Totman 1	3	
Chevrolet 8 Ford 5	Maples Motorsports	19	Morgen Baird	Jim Long 1 Nigel Bannister 1 Kenna Long 7 John Szulczewski 2 Collin Flueckiger 1 Kyle Totman 1	1	
Chevrolet 8 Ford 5	Maples Motorsports	19	Kenna Long	Jim Long 1 Nigel Bannister 1 Kenna Long 7 John Szulczewski 2 Collin Flueckiger 1 Kyle Totman 1	1	
Chevrolet 8 Ford 5	Maples Motorsports	19	Brad Perez	Jim Long 1 Nigel Bannister 1 Kenna Long 7 John Szulczewski 2 Collin Flueckiger 1 Kyle Totman 1	1	
Ford 5 Chevrolet 1 Toyota 1	MBM Motorsports	66	Derek White	Jeremy Petty 1 Jason Miller 6	2	
Ford 5 Chevrolet 1 Toyota 1	MBM Motorsports	66	Dystany Spurlock	Jeremy Petty 1 Jason Miller 6	5	
Ford 4 Chevrolet 1	Mullins Racing	3	Willie Mullins	Alex Quarterley 1 Jeff Spraker 2 Willie Mullins 1 Bryant Frazier 1	3	
Ford 4 Chevrolet 1	Mullins Racing	3	Alex Quarterley (Note: It was an 1/4 Ley Racing entry fielding Mullins Racing's owner points.)	Alex Quarterley 1 Jeff Spraker 2 Willie Mullins 1 Bryant Frazier 1	1	
Ford 4 Chevrolet 1	Mullins Racing	3	Bryce Applegate	Alex Quarterley 1 Jeff Spraker 2 Willie Mullins 1 Bryant Frazier 1	1	
Ford 2 Chevrolet 5	SPS Racing	24	Daniel Dye	Blake Bainbridge	6	
Ford 2 Chevrolet 5	SPS Racing	24	Caden Kvapil	Blake Bainbridge	1	
Toyota 1 Chevrolet 2	Wayne Peterson Motorsports	0	Nate Moeller	Wayne Peterson 1 Michael Peterson 2	3	

== Schedule ==
The entire schedule was released on October 4, 2025.

- The race at Phoenix in March was a combination race with the ARCA Menards Series West (highlighted in gold).
- The races at Toledo, Indanapolis, Iowa and Bristol are combination races with the ARCA Menards Series East (highlighted in silver).

No	Race title	Track	Location	Date	TV	Time (ET)	Live Stream
1	General Tire 200	O Daytona International Speedway	Daytona Beach, Florida	February 14	FOX	Noon	Fox Sports app
2	General Tire 150	O Phoenix Raceway	Avondale, Arizona	March 5	FS1	6 PM	Fox Sports app
3	Tide 150	O Kansas Speedway	Kansas City, Kansas	April 18	FS1	12:30 PM	Fox Sports app
4	Alabama Manufactured Housing 200	O Talladega Superspeedway	Lincoln, Alabama	April 25	FS1	12:30 PM	Fox Sports app
5	General Tire 100 at The Glen	R Watkins Glen International	Watkins Glen, New York	May 8	FS2	1:30 PM	Fox Sports app
6	Owens Corning 200	O Toledo Speedway	Toledo, Ohio	May 16	FS1	7 PM	Fox Sports app
7	Henry Ford Health 200	O Michigan International Speedway	Brooklyn, Michigan	June 5	FS2	5 PM	Fox Sports app
8	Sunset Hill Shooting Range 150	O Pocono Raceway	Long Pond, Pennsylvania	June 12	FS1	3 PM	Fox Sports app
9	Herr's Snacks 200	O Berlin Raceway	Marne, Michigan	June 20	FS2	7 PM	Fox Sports app
10	Shore Lunch 250 Presented By Dutch Boy	O Elko Speedway	Elko New Market, Minnesota	June 27	FS2	9 PM	Fox Sports app
11	Ashley Furniture 150	O Chicagoland Speedway	Joliet, Illinois	July 3	FS1	8 PM	Fox Sports app
12	Lime Rock Park 100	R Lime Rock Park	Lakeville, Connecticut	July 10	FS2	4 PM	Fox Sports app
13	LiUNA! 150 presented by IDEAL Garage Door	O Lucas Oil Indianapolis Raceway Park	Brownsburg, Indiana	July 24	FS1	5 PM	Fox Sports app
14	JR & CO. 150	O Iowa Speedway	Newton, Iowa	August 7	FS1	7 PM	Fox Sports app
15	Calypso 100	D Illinois State Fairgrounds Racetrack	Springfield, Illinois	August 23	FS1	2 PM	Fox Sports app
16	Atlas 200	O Madison International Speedway	Rutland, Wisconsin	August 28	FS1	9 PM	Fox Sports app
17	Audubon Park 100	D DuQuoin State Fairgrounds Racetrack	Du Quoin, Illinois	September 6	FS1	8:30 PM	Fox Sports app
18	Spruce 212	O Salem Speedway	Salem, Indiana	September 12	FOX	8 PM	Fox Sports app
19	Bush's Beans 200	O Bristol Motor Speedway	Bristol, Tennessee	September 17	FS1	5:30 PM	Fox Sports app
20	Menards 150	O Kansas Speedway	Kansas City, Kansas	September 25	FS1	8 PM	Fox Sports app

Notes

- Chicagoland Speedway and Pocono Raceway will return to the schedule for the first time since 2019 and 2023, respectively.
- Charlotte and Dover were removed from the schedule.

== Results and standings ==
=== Race results ===
No.	Race	Pole position	Most laps led	Winning driver	Manufacturer	No.	Winning team	Report
1	General Tire 200	Gus Dean	Jake Finch	Gio Ruggiero	Toyota	18	Joe Gibbs Racing	Report
2	General Tire 150	Carson Brown	Carson Brown	Carson Brown	Chevrolet	28	Pinnacle Racing Group	Report
3	Tide 150	Jack Wood	Gio Ruggiero	Gio Ruggiero	Toyota	18	Joe Gibbs Racing	Report
4	Alabama Manufactured Housing 200	Gio Ruggiero	Gio Ruggiero	Andy Jankowiak	Chevrolet	71	KLAS Motorsports	Report
5	General Tire 100 at The Glen	Max Reaves	Kaden Honeycutt	Kaden Honeycutt	Toyota	17	Cook Racing Technologies	Report
6	Owens Corning 200	Max Reaves	Tristan McKee	Tristan McKee	Chevrolet	77	Pinnacle Racing Group	Report
7	Henry Ford Health 200	Garrett Mitchell	Connor Mosack	Gio Ruggiero	Toyota	18	Joe Gibbs Racing	Report
8	Sunset Hill Shooting Range 150	Lanie Buice	Gio Ruggiero	Gio Ruggiero	Toyota	18	Joe Gibbs Racing	Report
9	Herr's Snacks 200	Thomas Annunziata	Max Reaves	Max Reaves	Toyota	18	Joe Gibbs Racing	Report
10	Shore Lunch 250 Presented By Dutch Boy	Thomas Annunziata	Landon S. Huffman	Max Reaves	Toyota	18	Joe Gibbs Racing	Report
11	Ashley Furniture 150	Thomas Annunziata	Connor Mosack	Connor Mosack	Chevrolet	28	Pinnacle Racing Group	Report
12	Lime Rock Park ARCA 100	Carson Brown	Thomas Annunziata	Thomas Annunziata	Toyota	70	Nitro Motorsports	Report
13	LiUNA! 150 presented by IDEAL Garage Door	Carson Brown	Carson Brown	Kaden Honeycutt	Toyota	17	Cook Racing Technologies	Report
14	JR & CO. 150	Tristan McKee	Tristan McKee	Tristan McKee	Chevrolet	77	Pinnacle Racing Group	Report
15	Calypso 100	Max Reaves	Max Reaves	Max Reaves	Toyota	18	Joe Gibbs Racing	Report
16	Atlas 200	Carson Brown	Tristan McKee	Tristan McKee	Chevrolet	77	Pinnacle Racing Group	Report
17	Audubon Park 100	Carson Brown	Carson Brown	Carson Brown	Chevrolet	28	Pinnacle Racing Group	Report
18	Spruce 212	Max Reaves	Max Reaves	Max Reaves	Toyota	18	Joe Gibbs Racing	Report
19	Bush's Best 200	Carson Brown	Carson Brown	Carson Brown	Chevrolet	28	Pinnacle Racing Group	Report
20	Menards 150	Gio Ruggiero	Gio Ruggiero	Carson Brown	Chevrolet	28	Pinnacle Racing Group	Report

=== Drivers' championship ===
Notes:

- The pole winner receives one bonus point, similar to the previous ARCA points system used until 2019, unlike NASCAR.
- Additionally, after groups of five races of the season, drivers that compete in all five races receive fifty additional points. These points bonuses will be given after the races at Watkins Glen, Elko, Springfield and fall Kansas.
  - Jake Bollman, Ryan Vargas, Andy Jankowiak, Thomas Annunziata, Jason Kitzmiller, Isabella Robusto, Takuma Koga, Michael Maples, Bobby Dale Earnhardt, Alex Clubb, and Brad Smith received these bonus points for having competed in the first five races of the season (Daytona, Phoenix, Kansas in April, Talladega, and Watkins Glen). Bollman, Annunziata, Robusto, Kitzmiller, Koga, Clubb, Earnhardt, Smith, and Jeff Maconi received this points bonus for having competed in the next five races of the season (Toledo, Michigan, Pocono, Berlin, and Elko). Bollman, Annunziata, Robusto, Kitzmiller, Koga, Clubb, Smith, and Maconi received this points bonus for having competed in the next five races of the season (Chicagoland, Lime Rock, IRP, Iowa and Springfield). Annunziata, Bollman, Robusto, Koga, Maples, Clubb, Carson Brown, Smith, and Maconi received this points bonus for having competed in the final five races of the season (Madison, DuQuoin, Salem, Bristol and Kansas in September).

(key) Bold – Pole position awarded by time. Italics – Pole position set by final practice results or rainout. * – Most laps led. ** – All laps led.

Pos	Driver	DAY	PHO	KAN	TAL	GLN	TOL	MCH	POC	BER	ELK	CHI	LRP	IRP	IOW	ISF	MAD	DSF	SLM	BRI	KAN	Points
1	Thomas Annunziata	26	3	9	26	3	2	6	6	**2**	**7**	5	1*	2	7	3	5	5	7	9	5	947
2	Jake Bollman **(R)**	2	6	3	18	10	4	2	4	3	2	8	5	7	3	6	4	2	2	6	21	947
3	Isabella Robusto	37	21	22	4	6	6	7	13	5	6	13	25	30	11	8	7	14	5	20	8	814
4	Takuma Koga	16	23	19	14	16	20	18	12	12	9	16	19	19	27	15	11	11	13	24	13	753
5	Jason Kitzmiller	7	16	6	33	23	7	23	9	10	5	9	17	16	25	10	9	7		11	7	736
6	Michael Maples	12	20	16	25	20	26	16	18	14	19	21	23	29	20	20	18	21	14	26	15	687
7	Alex Clubb	36	22	15	34	21	14	21	15	13	13	22	22	20	22	19	15	12	20	21	17	686
8	Carson Brown **(R)**		**1***			2	3		3				**3**	**3***	2	13	**2**	**1***	10	**1***	1	600
9	Brad Smith	25	39	26	22	33	17	29	22	18	16	25	27	24	29	18	21	23	16	31	19	600
10	Jeff Maconi **(R)**		40	17	20	27	18	24	16	19	15	18	29	21	24	17	17	18	15	23	14	594
11	Max Reaves **(R)**		9			8	**11**			1*	1		4	9	4	**1***	3	17	**1****	4		523
12	Gavan Boschele **(R)**			4		4		3	2			12		4	6	5		4	8	13	3	463
13	Bobby Dale Earnhardt	9	37	13	31	28	15	25	23	15	11	19	20		16					33	11	454
14	Andy Jankowiak	10	18	21	1	13	21	15				7	14		8					8	6	440
15	Ryan Vargas	8	17	11	8	14	9	12	10					PR	9			10				387
16	Isaac Kitzmiller		7			30	13		11				8	5	5	2	6	8		5		385
17	Tristan McKee		2			18	1*						7	32	**1***		1*		6	2		337
18	Gio Ruggiero	1		1*	5*			1	1*												2*	275
19	Nate Moeller		36	29		31	16			16	17	27	24	25	30			19	22	35	24	265
20	Austin Vaughn		Wth				24			20	10			14	19		12		9	18	25	245
21	Taylor Reimer	30	32		6					4	4					4		6				222
22	Daniel Dye	4		2	10			19	7			4										221
23	Lanie Buice			5				5	**5**			2									4	202
24	Jade Avedisian		28	7					8			6			10					7		198
25	Ed Pompa	21			16	17			14				28						12		16	184
26	Kevin Campbell			Wth			Wth			22	21			34	32	23	20	24	21		22	170
27	Matt Kemp			14	23		27	26		8		26							23			161
28	Ty Fredrickson										3		15		12		19			14		157
29	Will Kimmel			28	11			8											3		23	147
30	Craig Pellegrini Jr.			27		32	10							17	14					17		147
31	Dale Shearer	DNQ					23			17	18			26		16		22	Wth			145
32	Quinn Davis						12							11	15				17	25		140
33	Brayton Laster			23					17			20		27	31	24		Wth	Wth		26	140
34	Landon S. Huffman										14*	3							4		20	138
35	Kaden Honeycutt					1*								1						3		136
36	Sean Corr	33			7				19							12		16				133
37	Garrett Mitchell	11		20	2			**14**														132
38	Dystany Spurlock			10		29		13	24					13								131
39	Taylor Mayhew		8														16		18	10		124
40	Chase Buscaglia												18	23	23			15		22		119
41	Will Robinson									7			12				8					105
42	Robbie Kennealy	15	10	25	21																	105
43	Jack Wood	6		18	9																	100
44	Willie Mullins	17								11	8											96
45	Kyle Steckly					15		11				10										96
46	Zachary Tinkle		35							9				10						30		92
47	Jackson McLerran						25							15	28					16		92
48	Connor Mosack							4*				1*										90
49	Andrew Patterson	DNQ			28									6						12		89
50	Tony Cosentino	DNQ	25													14	10					86
51	Dustin Hillenburg		27					27	20			17										85
52	George Siciliano			12	29			10														81
53	Wesley Slimp	35					8	9														80
54	Tim Monroe											23				9		20				80
55	Andrew Ranger					7							2									79
56	Kelly Kovski															7		3				78
57	Con Nicolopoulos	31			19			20												29		77
58	Bryce Haugeberg	18			27						12											75
59	Monty Tipton		12	8	38																	74
60	Jake Finch	20*			12															28		74
61	Ryan Gemmell					9							6									73
62	Landon Brown											15		18							27	72
63	Jeff Anton					11							10									67
64	Tim Richmond	23			32							11										66
65	Esteban Rodríguez														13						10	65
66	Mike Basham																13		11			64
67	Charles Weslowski Jr.	24						30													18	60
68	Gus Dean	**29**			3																	58
69	Cody Dennison		19		13																	56
70	D. L. Wilson			24																	12	52
71	Morgen Baird							22				14										52
72	Brian Weber														17					19		52
73	Brian Barbarow						19								21							48
74	John Clagett									21	20											47
75	Nick White	DNQ			DNQ			28	21													45
76	Hunter Wright													12						32		44
77	Bryce Applegate	13												31								44
78	Rita Goulet						22							22								44
79	Ben Peterson														26				19			43
80	Trevor Huddleston		4																			40
81	Glen Reen	5																				39
82	Mason Massey		5																			39
83	Sam Corry					5																39
84	Caden Kvapil						5															39
85	Tyler Lupton									6												38
86	Kenna Long						28									22						38
87	Corey Aiken					25							26									37
88	Ashton Higgins													8								36
89	Dawson Sutton												9									35
90	Chase Howard															Wth		9				35
91	Mike Christopher Jr.																				9	35
92	A. J. Moyer	14			39																	35
93	Derek White	39			15																	34
94	Hailie Deegan		11																			33
95	Peter Portante												11									33
96	Shawn Allen Jr.															11						33
97	Ivis Earley													28						27		33
98	Tyler Kicera					12																32
99	John Kennedy																	13				32
100	Eric Johnson Jr.		13																			31
101	Stewart Friesen												13									31
102	Jaiden Reyna		14																			30
103	Daniel Sasnett																14					30
104	Logan Misuraca	DNQ			17																	30
105	Eric Caudell	22			36																	30
106	Kole Raz	3																				29
107	Andrew Chapman		15																			29
108	Gabriel Casagrande																			15		29
109	Graham Jacobson												16									28
110	Jeffery MacZink							17														27
111	Tony Musolino														18							26
112	Hunter Deshautelle	19																				25
113	Andrew Rocque					19																25
114	Alex Quarterley												21									23
115	Trenton Masters															21						23
116	Ron Vandermeir Jr.	DNQ			24																	23
117	Bryan Dauzat	28			37																	23
118	Patrick Staropoli					22																22
119	Cole Denton		24																			20
120	Trent Curtis					24																20
121	William Sawalich											24										20
122	Brad Perez		34																	34		20
123	Ryan Huff	40			30																	19
124	David Smith		26																			18
125	Christopher Werth					26																18
126	Presley Sorah	27																				17
127	Gavin Ray		29																			15
128	Mia Lovell		30																			14
129	Alli Owens	34			40																	14
130	Julian DaCosta		31																			13
131	Caleb Costner	32																				12
132	Steve Lewis Jr.	DNQ			35																	12
133	Tyler Tomassi		33																			11
134	Michael Clayton													33								11
135	Kadence Davenport														33							11
136	Mini Tyrrell	38																				6
137	Bobby Hillis Jr.		38																			6
	Greg Van Alst	DNQ																				
	Robert Martin	DNQ																				
	Nolan Wilson	DNQ																				
	Dale Quarterley												Wth									

== See also ==
- 2026 NASCAR Cup Series
- 2026 NASCAR O'Reilly Auto Parts Series
- 2026 NASCAR Craftsman Truck Series
- 2026 ARCA Menards Series East
- 2026 ARCA Menards Series West
- 2026 NASCAR Whelen Modified Tour
- 2026 NASCAR Euro Series
- 2026 NASCAR Canada Series
- 2026 NASCAR Brasil Series
- 2026 CARS Tour
- 2026 SMART Modified Tour
- 2026 ASA STARS National Tour
