= 2026 LiUNA! 150 (ARCA) =

Stock car race in Indiana, US

2026 LiUNA! 150 presented by IDEAL Garage Door
Race details
- Race 13 of 20 in the 2026 ARCA Menards Series; Race 5 of 8 in the 2026 ARCA Menards Series East
- Date: July 24, 2026
- Location: Lucas Oil Indianapolis Raceway Park in Brownsburg, Indiana
- Course: Permanent racing facility
- Course length: 0.686 miles (1.104 km)
- Distance: 150 laps, 102.9 mi (165.6 km)
- Average speed: 69.035 miles per hour (111.101 km/h)

Pole position
Driver	Carson Brown	Pinnacle Racing Group
- Time: 22.417

Most laps led
Driver	Carson Brown	Pinnacle Racing Group
- Laps: 78

Fastest lap
Driver	Kaden Honeycutt	Cook Racing Technologies
- Time: 23.073

Winner
No. 17	Kaden Honeycutt	Cook Racing Technologies

Television in the United States
- Network: FS1
- Announcers: Brent Stover and Phil Parsons

Radio in the United States
- Radio: MRN
- Booth announcers: Kurt Becker and Kyle Rickey
- Turn announcers: Tim Catafalmo (Backstretch and Turns 2 & 3)

The 2026 LiUNA! 150 presented by IDEAL Garage Door was an ARCA Menards Series and ARCA Menards Series East combination race held on Friday, July 24, 2026, at Lucas Oil Indianapolis Raceway Park in Brownsburg, Indiana. Contested over 150 laps on the 0.686 miles (1.104 km) asphalt oval, it was the 13th race of the 2026 ARCA Menards Series season, the 5th race of the 2026 ARCA Menards Series East season, and the 17th running of the event.

In an action-packed race, Kaden Honeycutt, driving for Cook Racing Technologies, grabbed the lead from pole-sitter Carson Brown on lap 78, and dominated the rest of the event to earn his second career ARCA Menards Series win, his second of the season, and his first career ARCA Menards Series East win. Thomas Annunziata finished second, and Brown finished third after his engine unexpectedly shut off for a moment in the final laps. Gavan Boschele and Isaac Kitzmiller rounded out the top five, while Andrew Patterson, Jake Bollman, Ashton Higgins, Max Reaves, and Zachary Tinkle rounded out the top ten.

== Report ==
=== Background ===
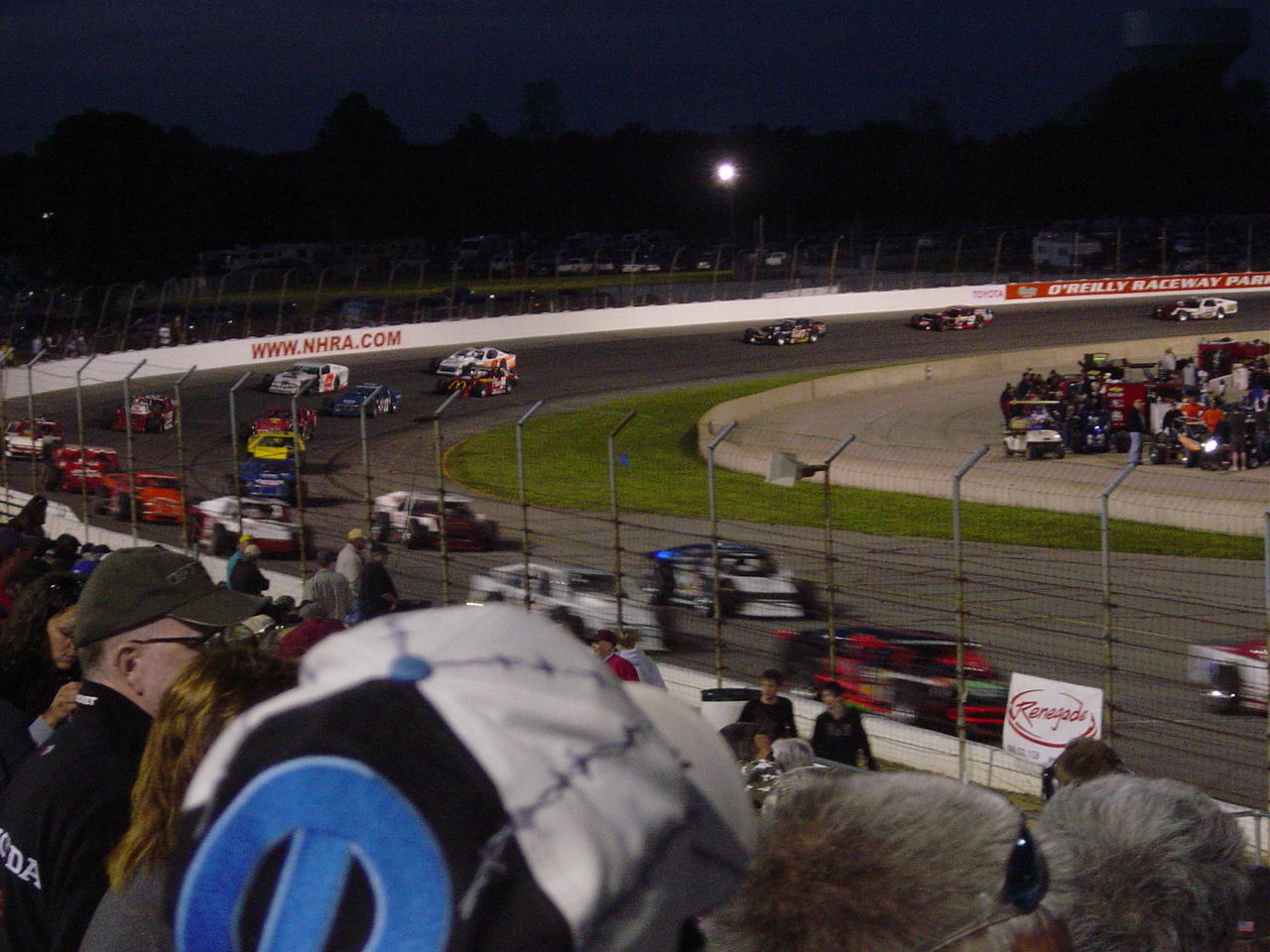
Lucas Oil Indianapolis Raceway Park, the track where the race will be held.

Lucas Oil Indianapolis Raceway Park (formerly Indianapolis Raceway Park, O'Reilly Raceway Park at Indianapolis, and Lucas Oil Raceway) is an auto racing facility in Brownsburg, Indiana, about 10 miles (16 km) northwest of downtown Indianapolis. It includes a 0.686-mile (1.104 km) oval track, a 2.5-mile (4.0 km) road course (which has fallen into disrepair and is no longer used), and a 4,400-foot (1,300 m) drag strip which is among the premier drag racing venues in the world. The complex receives about 500,000 visitors annually.

==== Entry list ====
- (R) denotes rookie driver.

#	Driver	Team	Make
0	Nate Moeller	Wayne Peterson Motorsports	Toyota
03	Alex Clubb	Clubb Racing Inc.	Ford
3	Bryce Applegate	Mullins Racing	Ford
5	Michael Clayton	City Garage Motorsports	Ford
06	Jackson McLerran	MAN Motorsports	Toyota
10	Craig Pellegrini Jr. (R)	Fast Track Racing	Toyota
11	Chase Buscaglia	Fast Track Racing	Ford
12	Takuma Koga	Fast Track Racing	Toyota
13	Rita Goulet	Integrity Autosports	Toyota
15	Ashton Higgins	Nitro Motorsports	Toyota
17	Kaden Honeycutt	Cook Racing Technologies	Toyota
18	Max Reaves (R)	Joe Gibbs Racing	Toyota
19	Austin Vaughn	Maples Motorsports	Ford
20	Jake Bollman (R)	Nitro Motorsports	Toyota
25	Gavan Boschele (R)	Nitro Motorsports	Toyota
28	Carson Brown (R)	Pinnacle Racing Group	Chevrolet
34	Ivis Earley	VWV Racing	Toyota
40	Andrew Patterson	Andrew Patterson Racing	Chevrolet
48	Brad Smith	Brad Smith Motorsports	Ford
53	Zachary Tinkle	Tinkle Family Racing	Toyota
55	Isabella Robusto	Nitro Motorsports	Toyota
66	Dystany Spurlock	MBM Motorsports	Toyota
69	Landon Brown	Kimmel Racing	Ford
70	Thomas Annunziata	Nitro Motorsports	Toyota
77	Tristan McKee (R)	Pinnacle Racing Group	Chevrolet
79	Isaac Kitzmiller	ACR Motorsports	Chevrolet
81	Kevin Campbell	KC Motorsports	Chevrolet
85	Quinn Davis (R)	City Garage Motorsports	Ford
86	Jeff Maconi (R)	Clubb Racing Inc.	Ford
89	Brayton Laster	Rise Racing	Chevrolet
91	Michael Maples	Maples Motorsports	Ford
95	Hunter Wright	MAN Motorsports	Toyota
97	Jason Kitzmiller	CR7 Motorsports	Chevrolet
98	Dale Shearer	Shearer Speed Racing	Toyota
Official entry list

== Practice ==
The first and only practice session was held on Friday, July 24, at 1:00 PM EST, and lasted for 45 minutes.

Max Reaves, driving for Joe Gibbs Racing, set the fastest time in the session, with a lap of 22.757 seconds, and a speed of 108.520 miles per hour (174.646 km/h).

Pos.	#	Driver	Team	Make	Time	Speed
1	18	Max Reaves (R)	Joe Gibbs Racing	Toyota	22.757	108.520
2	55	Isabella Robusto	Nitro Motorsports	Toyota	22.921	107.743
3	77	Tristan McKee (R)	Pinnacle Racing Group	Chevrolet	22.928	107.711
Full practice results

== Qualifying ==
Qualifying was held on Friday, July 24, at 2:00 PM EST. The qualifying procedure used was a multi-car, multi-lap based system. All drivers were on track for a 20-minute timed session, and whoever set the fastest time in the session won the pole.

Carson Brown, driving for Pinnacle Racing Group, set the fastest time in the session, with a lap of 22.417 seconds, and a speed of 110.166 miles per hour (177.295 km/h). Due to an engine failure in practice, Michael Maples withdrew his No. 99 car and will drive the No. 91 for the race, originally slated to be driven by Ryan Vargas.

=== Qualifying results ===
Pos.	#	Driver	Team	Make	Time	Speed
1	28	Carson Brown (R)	Pinnacle Racing Group	Chevrolet	22.417	110.166
2	70	Thomas Annunziata	Nitro Motorsports	Toyota	22.459	109.960
3	18	Max Reaves (R)	Joe Gibbs Racing	Toyota	22.476	109.877
4	77	Tristan McKee (R)	Pinnacle Racing Group	Chevrolet	22.522	109.653
5	25	Gavan Boschele (R)	Nitro Motorsports	Toyota	22.560	109.468
6	55	Isabella Robusto	Nitro Motorsports	Toyota	22.632	109.120
7	17	Kaden Honeycutt	Cook Racing Technologies	Toyota	22.732	108.640
8	3	Bryce Applegate	Mullins Racing	Ford	22.740	108.602
9	15	Ashton Higgins	Nitro Motorsports	Toyota	22.767	108.473
10	20	Jake Bollman (R)	Nitro Motorsports	Toyota	22.807	108.283
11	79	Isaac Kitzmiller	ACR Motorsports	Chevrolet	22.854	108.060
12	40	Andrew Patterson	Andrew Patterson Racing	Chevrolet	22.880	107.937
13	97	Jason Kitzmiller	CR7 Motorsports	Chevrolet	22.902	107.833
14	69	Landon Brown	Kimmel Racing	Ford	22.947	107.622
15	95	Hunter Wright	MAN Motorsports	Toyota	23.034	107.215
16	85	Quinn Davis (R)	City Garage Motorsports	Ford	23.214	106.384
17	53	Zachary Tinkle	Tinkle Family Racing	Toyota	23.230	106.311
18	12	Takuma Koga	Fast Track Racing	Toyota	23.472	105.215
19	66	Dystany Spurlock	MBM Motorsports	Toyota	23.569	104.782
20	06	Jackson McLerran	MAN Motorsports	Toyota	23.604	104.626
21	19	Austin Vaughn	Maples Motorsports	Ford	23.798	103.773
22	10	Craig Pellegrini Jr. (R)	Fast Track Racing	Toyota	24.039	102.733
23	11	Chase Buscaglia	Fast Track Racing	Ford	24.388	101.263
24	03	Alex Clubb	Clubb Racing Inc.	Ford	24.635	100.248
25	13	Rita Goulet	Integrity Autosports	Toyota	24.665	100.126
26	86	Jeff Maconi (R)	Clubb Racing Inc.	Ford	24.885	99.241
27	91	Michael Maples	Maples Motorsports	Ford	24.907	99.153
28	5	Michael Clayton	City Garage Motorsports	Ford	25.219	97.926
29	34	Ivis Earley	VWV Racing	Toyota	25.347	97.432
30	48	Brad Smith	Brad Smith Motorsports	Ford	25.726	95.996
31	98	Dale Shearer	Shearer Speed Racing	Toyota	25.757	95.881
32	89	Brayton Laster	Rise Racing	Chevrolet	25.997	94.996
33	0	Nate Moeller	Wayne Peterson Motorsports	Toyota	26.291	93.933
34	81	Kevin Campbell	KC Motorsports	Chevrolet	—	—
Official qualifying results

== Race ==
=== Race results ===
Laps: 150

Fin	St	#	Driver	Team	Make	Laps	Led	Status	Pts
1	7	17	Kaden Honeycutt	Cook Racing Technologies	Toyota	150	72	Running	48
2	2	70	Thomas Annunziata	Nitro Motorsports	Toyota	150	0	Running	42
3	1	28	Carson Brown (R)	Pinnacle Racing Group	Chevrolet	150	78	Running	44
4	5	25	Gavan Boschele (R)	Nitro Motorsports	Toyota	150	0	Running	40
5	11	79	Isaac Kitzmiller	ACR Motorsports	Chevrolet	150	0	Running	89
6	12	40	Andrew Patterson	Andrew Patterson Racing	Chevrolet	150	0	Running	38
7	10	20	Jake Bollman (R)	Nitro Motorsports	Toyota	150	0	Running	37
8	9	15	Ashton Higgins	Nitro Motorsports	Toyota	150	0	Running	36
9	3	18	Max Reaves (R)	Joe Gibbs Racing	Toyota	150	0	Running	85
10	17	53	Zachary Tinkle	Tinkle Family Racing	Toyota	150	0	Running	34
11	16	85	Quinn Davis (R)	City Garage Motorsports	Ford	149	0	Running	83
12	15	95	Hunter Wright	MAN Motorsports	Toyota	149	0	Running	32
13	19	66	Dystany Spurlock	MBM Motorsports	Toyota	149	0	Running	31
14	21	19	Austin Vaughn	Maples Motorsports	Ford	148	0	Running	80
15	20	06	Jackson McLerran	MAN Motorsports	Toyota	148	0	Running	79
16	13	97	Jason Kitzmiller	CR7 Motorsports	Chevrolet	148	0	Running	28
17	22	10	Craig Pellegrini Jr. (R)	Fast Track Racing	Toyota	148	0	Running	77
18	14	69	Landon Brown	Kimmel Racing	Ford	147	0	Running	26
19	18	12	Takuma Koga	Fast Track Racing	Toyota	147	0	Running	25
20	24	03	Alex Clubb	Clubb Racing Inc.	Ford	144	0	Running	24
21	26	86	Jeff Maconi (R)	Clubb Racing Inc.	Ford	143	0	Running	23
22	25	13	Rita Goulet	Integrity Autosports	Toyota	143	0	Running	22
23	23	11	Chase Buscaglia	Fast Track Racing	Ford	142	0	Running	21
24	31	48	Brad Smith	Brad Smith Motorsports	Ford	141	0	Running	20
25	29	0	Nate Moeller	Wayne Peterson Motorsports	Toyota	140	0	Running	69
26	32	98	Dale Shearer	Shearer Speed Racing	Toyota	139	0	Running	18
27	30	89	Brayton Laster	Rise Racing	Chevrolet	134	0	Running	17
28	28	34	Ivis Earley	VWV Racing	Toyota	133	0	Running	16
29	27	91	Michael Maples	Maples Motorsports	Ford	88	0	Mechanical	65
30	6	55	Isabella Robusto	Nitro Motorsports	Toyota	79	0	Accident	14
31	8	3	Bryce Applegate	Mullins Racing	Ford	79	0	Accident	13
32	4	77	Tristan McKee (R)	Pinnacle Racing Group	Chevrolet	74	0	Mechanical	62
33	34	5	Michael Clayton	City Garage Motorsports	Ford	28	0	Mechanical	11
34	33	81	Kevin Campbell	KC Motorsports	Chevrolet	0	0	Did Not Start	3
Official race results

=== Race statistics ===
- Lead changes: 3 among 2 different drivers
- Cautions/Laps: 6 for 42 laps
- Red flags: 0
- Time of race: 1 hour, 29 minutes and 26 seconds
- Average speed: 69.035 miles per hour (111.101 km/h)

== Standings after the race ==
Drivers' Championship standings (ARCA Main)

	Pos	Driver	Points
	1	Jake Bollman	582
	2	Thomas Annunziata	579 (–3)
1	3	Jason Kitzmiller	491 (–91)
1	4	Isabella Robusto	479 (–103)
	5	Takuma Koga	459 (–123)
	6	Michael Maples	413 (–169)
1	7	Alex Clubb	404 (–178)
1	8	Bobby Dale Earnhardt	382 (–200)
1	9	Brad Smith	349 (–233)
1	10	Andy Jankowiak	330 (–252)

Drivers' Championship standings (ARCA East)

	Pos	Driver	Points
1	1	Max Reaves	250
1	2	Tristan McKee	247 (–3)
	3	Isaac Kitzmiller	241 (–9)
	4	Craig Pellegrini Jr.	218 (–32)
	5	Jackson McLerran	208 (–42)
2	6	Austin Vaughn	194 (–56)
2	7	Quinn Davis	194 (–56)
2	8	Nate Moeller	187 (–63)
2	9	Carson Brown	162 (–88)
	10	Michael Maples	161 (–89)

- Note: Only the first 10 positions are included for the driver standings.

Previous race: 2026 Lime Rock Park ARCA 100	ARCA Menards Series; 2026 season	Next race: 2026 JR & CO. 150

Previous race: 2026 Owens Corning 200	ARCA Menards Series East; 2026 season	Next race: 2026 Sunbelt Rentals 150
