= Hunter Deshautelle =

American racing driver (born 1998)

- Born: February 14, 1998 (age 28); Alexandria, Louisiana, U.S.

ARCA Menards Series career
- 8 races run over 4 years
- Best finish: 57th (2024)
- First race: 2023 Brandt 200 (Daytona)
- Last race: 2026 General Tire 200 (Daytona)
Wins	Top tens	Poles
0	0	0

ARCA Menards Series East career
- 1 race run over 1 year
- Best finish: 55th (2026)
- First race: 2026 Cook Out 200 (Hickory)
Wins	Top tens	Poles
0	0	0
- Statistics up to date as of March 28, 2026.

Hunter Deshautelle (born February 14, 1998) is an American professional stock car racing driver. He last competed part-time in the ARCA Menards Series and ARCA Menards Series East, driving the No. 57 Chevrolet for Brother-In-Law Racing.

== Racing career ==
In 2023, Deshauntelle participated in pre-season testing for the ARCA Menards Series at Daytona International Speedway, driving for Brother-In-Law Racing, where he would finish 31st in the Friday session and 24th in the Saturday session. He would eventually join with the team in the No. 57 Chevrolet at the season opening Brandt 200. After starting 22nd, five places higher than his team owner Bryan Dauzat, who had qualified 27th, Deshautelle would finish 39th after only three laps due to radiator issues. He would return to the team for Talladega Superspeedway, this time starting 25th due to ARCA reverting to the owner standings from the following year to determine the starting lineup, but would finish 29th after being involved in a multi-car crash when Jason Kitzmiller's transmission locked up on a restart on lap 23. He would return for the 2024 Daytona pre-practice.

Deshautelle has also competed in the Paramount Kia Big 10 Challenge at Hickory Motor Speedway.

== Motorsports career results ==
=== ARCA Menards Series ===
(key) (Bold – Pole position awarded by qualifying time. Italics – Pole position earned by points standings or practice time. * – Most laps led. ** – All laps led.)

ARCA Menards Series results
Year	Team	No.	Make	1	2	3	4	5	6	7	8	9	10	11	12	13	14	15	16	17	18	19	20	AMSC	Pts	Ref
2023	Brother-In-Law Racing	57	Chevy	DAY; 39	PHO	TAL; 29	KAN	CLT	BLN	ELK	MOH	IOW	POC	MCH	IRP	GLN	ISF	MLW	DSF	KAN	BRI	SLM	TOL	110th	20	
2024	Brother-In-Law Racing	57	Chevy	DAY; DNQ	PHO	TAL; 24	DOV	KAN																57th	65	
2024	Brother-In-Law Racing	75	Chevy	DAY; 20					CLT; 23	IOW	MOH	BLN	IRP	SLM	ELK	MCH	ISF	MLW	DSF	GLN	BRI	KAN	TOL	57th	65	
2025	Brother-In-Law Racing	57	Chevy	DAY; 11	PHO	TAL; 13	KAN	CLT	MCH	BLN	ELK	LRP	DOV	IRP	IOW	GLN	ISF	MAD	DSF	BRI	SLM	KAN	TOL	69th	64	
2026	Brother-In-Law Racing	57	Chevy	DAY; 19	PHO	KAN	TAL	GLN	TOL	MCH	POC	BER	ELK	CHI	LRP	IRP	IOW	ISF	MAD	DSF	SLM	BRI	KAN	112th	25	

==== ARCA Menards Series East ====
ARCA Menards Series East results
Year	Team	No.	Make	1	2	3	4	5	6	7	8	AMSEC	Pts	Ref
2026	Brother-In-Law Racing	57	Chevy	HCY; 12	CAR	NSV	TOL	IRP	FRS	IOW	BRI	55th	32	
