= Steve Lewis Jr. =

American racing driver

- Born: Steve Lewis Jr. January 18, 1999 (age 27); Ransomville, New York, U.S.

ARCA Menards Series career
- 5 races run over 4 years
- Best finish: 64th (2023)
- First race: 2023 Brandt 200 (Daytona)
- Last race: 2026 Alabama Manufactured Housing 200 (Talladega)
Wins	Top tens	Poles
0	0	0
- Statistics up to date as of April 25, 2025.

Steve Lewis Jr. (born January 18, 1999) is an American professional stock car racing driver. He last competed part-time in the ARCA Menards Series, driving the No. 62 Chevrolet for Steve Lewis Racing.

== Racing career ==
From 2017 to 2022, Lewis competed in various dirt modified series such as the Super DIRTcar Big-Block Modified Series, the DIRTcar 358-Modified Series, a series where he would finish eighth in points in 2021, and the Mighty TQ Midgets of Western New York.

In the fall of 2022, Lewis contacted Kyle Sieg and purchased an intermediate ARCA Menards Series car from RSS Racing that would need a new motor, transmission, and rear end and converted it into a superspeedway car with help from fellow driver Andy Jankowiak. Lewis would take part in pre-season testing at Daytona International Speedway in January and would finish 36th and 45th in the time sheets for Friday and Saturday respectively. He would then be approved to race by ARCA afterwards. He would make his debut in the series in the season opening race at Daytona in the No. 62 Chevrolet. After starting 24th, he would go on to finish thirteenth.

== Personal life ==
Lewis currently resides in his hometown of Ransomville, New York, where he continues to run dirt modifieds.

== Motorsports career results ==
=== ARCA Menards Series ===
(key) (Bold – Pole position awarded by qualifying time. Italics – Pole position earned by points standings or practice time. * – Most laps led. ** – All laps led.)

ARCA Menards Series results
Year	Team	No.	Make	1	2	3	4	5	6	7	8	9	10	11	12	13	14	15	16	17	18	19	20	AMSC	Pts	Ref
2023	Steve Lewis Racing	62	Chevy	DAY; 13	PHO	TAL; 22	KAN	CLT	BLN	ELK	MOH	IOW	POC	MCH	IRP	GLN	ISF	MLW	DSF	KAN	BRI	SLM	TOL	64th	53	
2024	Steve Lewis Racing	62	Chevy	DAY; 14	PHO	TAL	DOV	KAN	CLT	IOW	MOH	BLN	IRP	SLM	ELK	MCH	ISF	MLW	DSF	GLN	BRI	KAN	TOL	89th	30	
2025	Steve Lewis Racing	62	Chevy	DAY; DNQ	PHO	TAL; 15	KAN	CLT	MCH	BLN	ELK	LRP	DOV	IRP	IOW	GLN	ISF	MAD	DSF	BRI	SLM	KAN	TOL	106th	32	
2026	Steve Lewis Racing	62	Chevy	DAY; DNQ	PHO	KAN																		132nd	12	
2026	Steve Lewis Racing	79	Chevy				TAL; 35	GLN	TOL	MCH	POC	BER	ELK	CHI	LRP	IRP	IOW	ISF	MAD	DSF	SLM	BRI	KAN	132nd	12	
