= Willie Mullins (racing driver) =

American stock car racing owner-driver

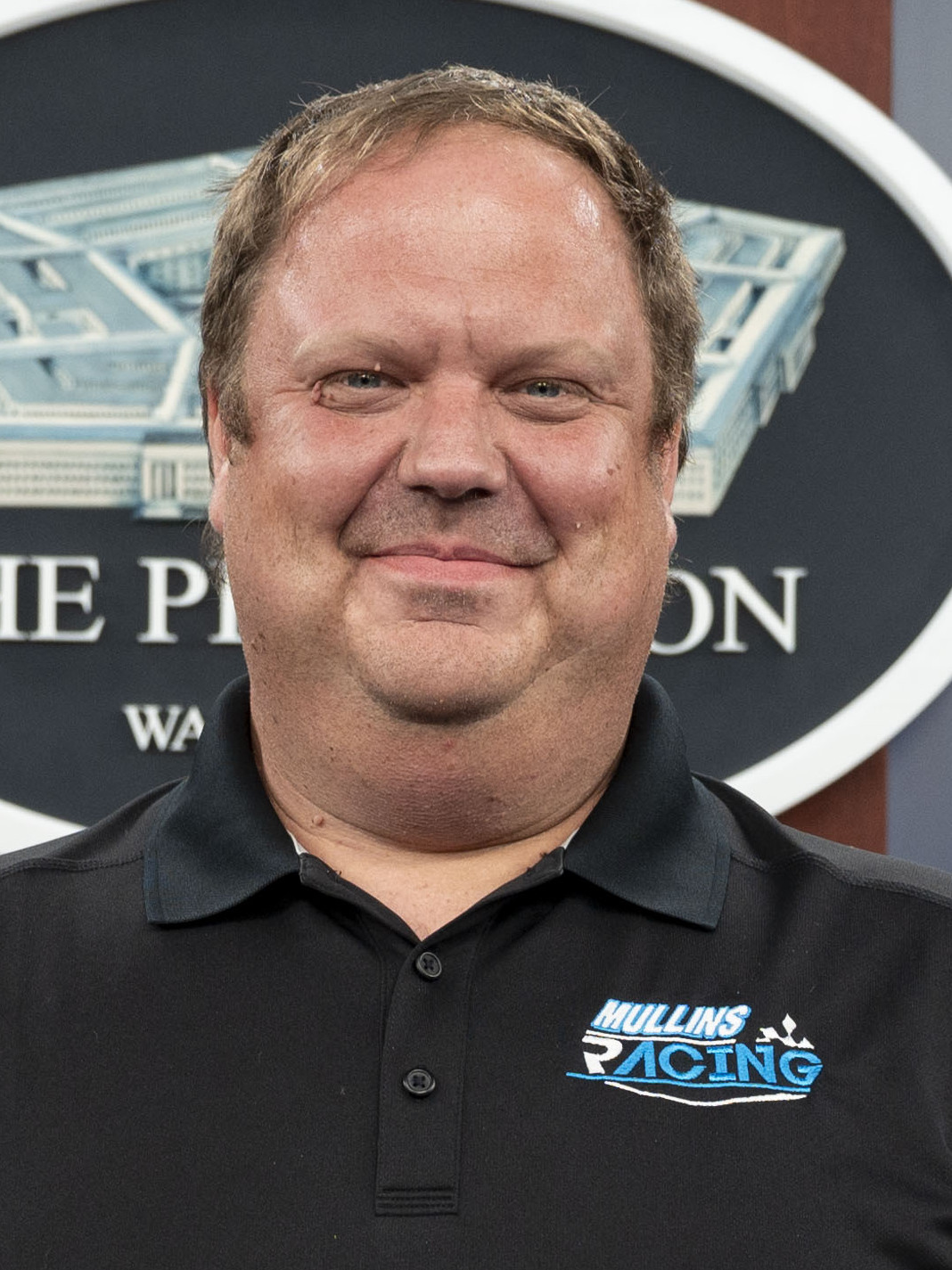
- Mullins in 2024
- Born: September 30, 1980 (age 46); Fredericksburg, Virginia, U.S.

ARCA Menards Series career
- 37 races run over 15 years
- Best finish: 28th (2025)
- First race: 2008 Loud Energy Drink 150 (New Jersey)
- Last race: 2026 Shore Lunch 250 (Elko)
Wins	Top tens	Poles
0	12	1

ARCA Menards Series East career
- 4 races run over 3 years
- Best finish: 25th (2022)
- First race: 2020 New Smyrna 175 (New Smyrna)
- Last race: 2022 Pensacola 200 (Pensacola)
Wins	Top tens	Poles
0	3	0
- Statistics up to date as of June 27, 2026.

Willie Mullins (born September 30, 1980) is an American professional stock car racing owner-driver. He last competed part-time in the ARCA Menards Series driving for his own team, Mullins Racing.

== Racing career ==
=== Early racing career ===
In 2006, Mullins would win the SCCA V8 Grand National champion, along with receiving Rookie of the Year honors.

=== ARCA Menards Series ===
Throughout 2008–2012, Mullins would race one-off events at New Jersey Motorsports Park, scoring a best of fifteenth in 2011.

In 2016, using a car acquired from the defunct Yates Racing, Mullins earned a top-ten finish at the season-opener at Daytona International Speedway. He would also run at Talladega and New Jersey, finishing seventeenth and fifteenth respectively.

In 2018, Mullins would score a major upset second-place at the season-opener. He would also run the race at Elko, finishing thirteenth.

In 2019, Mullins would finish last at Daytona due to a crash on lap 3. He would run the at Charlotte and the second Pocono race, finishing seventeenth and fourteenth respectively.

In 2020, after scoring a top-ten for his team at Daytona, Mullins would partner his team with Fast Track Racing for two races. He finished eighteenth at Talladega and eleventh at Kentucky.

In 2021, Mullins finished 28th at Daytona with a vibration issue. With equipment bought from the defunct KBR Development, he would score another top-ten finish at Elko Speedway. He would also run the race at Salem, finishing twelfth.

In 2022, Mullins would again run three races, finishing fourteenth at Daytona, fifteenth at Talladega, and ninth at Elko.

In 2023, Mullins ran at Daytona and Elko, finishing twentieth and eighth respectively.

In 2024, Mullins would score his first career pole in the season-opener. He would finish 28th after being involved in a crash. He would return for the season finale at Toledo, finishing ninth. He was nominated for the 2025 Hoosier Heroes program later that year. He would be named as a winner in December.

==== ARCA Menards Series East ====
In 2020, Mullins ran a one-off race at New Smyrna Speedway, finishing twentieth.

In 2021, Mullins would once again race a one-off at New Smyrna, earning a top-ten.

== Personal life ==
Mullins is the owner of Bugsy's Auto Body & Repair, which often sponsors him in his races. He has ducks that live in the pond on his property, and puts duck decals on his cars during races.

== Motorsports career results ==
=== Stock car career summary ===
Season	Series	Team	Races	Wins	Top 5	Top 10	Points	Position
2008	ARCA Re/Max Series	Mullins Racing	1	0	0	0	60	149th
2009	ARCA Re/Max Series	Mullins Racing	1	0	0	0	80	147th
2011	ARCA Racing Series	Mullins Racing	1	0	0	0	115	113th
2012	ARCA Racing Series	Mullins Racing	1	0	0	0	155	106th
2016	ARCA Racing Series	Mullins Racing	3	0	0	1	490	49th
2017	ARCA Racing Series	Mullins Racing	4	0	0	0	485	41st
2018	ARCA Racing Series	Mullins Racing	2	0	1	1	385	55th
2019	ARCA Menards Series	Mullins Racing	3	0	0	0	360	50th
2020	ARCA Menards Series East	Mullins Racing	1	0	0	0	24	50th
2020	ARCA Menards Series	Mullins Racing	1	0	0	1	95	35th
2020	ARCA Menards Series	Fast Track Racing	2	0	0	0	95	35th
2021	ARCA Menards Series East	Mullins Racing	1	0	0	1	34	39th
2021	ARCA Menards Series	Mullins Racing	1	0	0	0	84	44th
2021	ARCA Menards Series	Fast Track Racing	2	0	0	1	84	44th
2022	ARCA Menards Series East	Fast Track Racing	2	0	1	2	75	25th
2022	ARCA Menards Series	Mullins Racing	2	0	0	0	94	39th
2022	ARCA Menards Series	Fast Track Racing	1	0	0	1	94	39th
2023	ARCA Menards Series	Mullins Racing	1	0	0	0	60	62nd
2023	ARCA Menards Series	Fast Track Racing	1	0	0	1	60	62nd
2024	ARCA Menards Series	Mullins Racing	1	0	0	0	53	70th
2024	ARCA Menards Series	Fast Track Racing	1	0	0	1	53	70th
2025	ARCA Menards Series	Mullins Racing	5	0	0	4	149	28th
2026	ARCA Menards Series	Mullins Racing	3	0	0	1	96	44th

=== ARCA Menards Series ===
(key) (Bold – Pole position awarded by qualifying time. Italics – Pole position earned by points standings or practice time. * – Most laps led.)

ARCA Menards Series results
Year	Team	No.	Make	1	2	3	4	5	6	7	8	9	10	11	12	13	14	15	16	17	18	19	20	21	AMSC	Pts	Ref
2008	Mullins Racing	14	Chevy	DAY	SLM	IOW	KAN	CAR	KEN	TOL	POC	MCH	CAY	KEN	BLN	POC	NSH	ISF	DSF	CHI	SLM	NJM; 34	TAL	TOL	149th	60	
2009	Mullins Racing	5	Chevy	DAY	SLM	CAR	TAL	KEN	TOL	POC	MCH	MFD	IOW	KEN	BLN	POC	ISF	CHI	TOL	DSF	NJM; 30	SLM	KAN	CAR	147th	80	
2011	Mullins Racing	5	Chevy	DAY	TAL	SLM	TOL	NJM; 23	CHI	POC	MCH	WIN	BLN	IOW	IRP	POC	ISF	MAD	DSF	SLM	KAN	TOL			113th	115	
2012	Mullins Racing	5	Chevy	DAY	MOB	SLM	TAL	TOL	ELK	POC	MCH	WIN	NJM; 15	IOW	CHI	IRP	POC	BLN	ISF	MAD	SLM	DSF; C	KAN		106th	155	
2016	Mullins Racing	34	Ford	DAY; 8	NSH	SLM	TAL; 17	TOL	NJM; 15	POC	MCH	MAD	WIN	IOW	IRP	POC	BLN	ISF	DSF	SLM	CHI	KEN	KAN		49th	490	
2017	Mullins Racing	34	Ford	DAY; 40	NSH; 17	SLM	TAL; 16	TOL	ELK; 14	POC	MCH	MAD	IOW	IRP	POC	WIN	ISF	ROA	DSF	SLM	CHI	KEN	KAN		41st	485	
2018	Mullins Racing	3	Ford	DAY; 2	NSH	SLM	TAL	TOL	CLT	POC	MCH	MAD	GTW	CHI	IOW	ELK; 13	POC	ISF	BLN	DSF	SLM	IRP	KAN		55th	385	
2019	Mullins Racing	3	Ford	DAY; 35	FIF	SLM	TAL	NSH	TOL	CLT; 17	POC	MCH	MAD	GTW	CHI	ELK	IOW	POC; 14	ISF	DSF	SLM	IRP	KAN		50th	360	
2020	Mullins Racing	3	Ford	DAY; 8	PHO																				35th	95	
2020	Fast Track Racing	11	Ford			TAL; 18	POC	IRP	KEN; 11	IOW	KAN	TOL	TOL	MCH	DAY	GTW	L44	TOL	BRI	WIN	MEM	ISF	KAN		35th	95	
2021	Mullins Racing	3	Chevy	DAY; 28	PHO	TAL	KAN	TOL	CLT	MOH	POC														44th	84	
2021	Fast Track Racing	10	Ford									ELK; 8	BLN	IOW	WIN	GLN	MCH	ISF	MLW	DSF	BRI				44th	84	
2021	Fast Track Racing	01	Ford																			SLM; 12	KAN		44th	84	
2022	Mullins Racing	3	Chevy	DAY; 14	PHO	TAL; 15	KAN	CLT	IOW	BLN															39th	94	
2022	Fast Track Racing	12	Toyota								ELK; 9	MOH	POC	IRP	MCH	GLN	ISF	MLW	DSF	KAN	BRI	SLM	TOL		39th	94	
2023	Mullins Racing	3	Chevy	DAY; 20	PHO	TAL	KAN	CLT	BLN																62nd	60	
2023	Fast Track Racing	10	Ford							ELK; 8	MOH	IOW	POC	MCH	IRP	GLN	ISF	MLW	DSF	KAN	BRI	SLM	TOL		62nd	60	
2024	Mullins Racing	3	Ford	**DAY**; 28	PHO	TAL	DOV	KAN	CLT	IOW	MOH	BLN	IRP	SLM	ELK	MCH	ISF	MLW	DSF	GLN	BRI	KAN			70th	53	
2024	Fast Track Racing	10	Toyota																				TOL; 9		70th	53	
2025	Mullins Racing	3	Ford	DAY; 35	PHO	TAL	KAN	CLT	MCH									MAD; 10	DSF	BRI	SLM	KAN	TOL; 7		28th	149	
2025	Mullins Racing	3	Toyota							BLN; 10	ELK; 9	LRP	DOV	IRP	IOW	GLN	ISF								28th	149	
2026	Mullins Racing	3	Ford	DAY; 17	PHO	KAN	TAL	GLN	TOL	MCH	POC	BER; 11	ELK; 8	CHI	LRP	IRP	IOW	ISF	MAD	DSF	SLM	BRI	KAN		44th	96	

==== ARCA Menards Series East ====
ARCA Menards Series East results
Year	Team	No.	Make	1	2	3	4	5	6	7	8	AMSEC	Pts	Ref
2020	Mullins Racing	3	Ford	NSM; 20	TOL	DOV	TOL	BRI	FIF			50th	24	
2021	Mullins Racing	3	Ford	NSM; 10	FIF	NSV	DOV	SNM	IOW	MLW	BRI	39th	34	
2022	Fast Track Racing	11	Toyota	NSM; 8	FIF; 5	DOV	NSV	IOW	MLW	BRI		25th	75	
