= Tyler Lupton =

American racing driver (born 2011)

- Born: Tyler Lupton; March 28, 2011 (age 15); Clarkston, Michigan, U.S.

ARCA Menards Series career
- 1 race run over 1 year
- Best finish: 85th (2026)
- First race: 2026 Herr's Snacks 200 (Berlin)
Wins	Top tens	Poles
0	1	0
- Statistics up to date as of September 26, 2026.

Tyler Lupton (born March 28, 2011) is an American professional stock car racing driver. He last competed part-time in the ARCA Menards Series, driving the No. 28 Chevrolet SS for Pinnacle Racing Group.

== Racing career ==
Lupton began racing at six years old, driving quarter midgets at his local go-kart track. In 2023, he competed in various divisions of the NASCAR Youth Series, winning the national championship in the Formula MOD class. He later progressed into legends cars and micro sprints, before transitioning to late models in 2025. Since then, he has competed regularly at Berlin Raceway, winning two races in his first season, with a fourth-place points finish in the super late model class.

=== ARCA Menards Series ===
On June 11, 2026, it was announced that Lupton would make his ARCA Menards Series debut at Berlin, driving the No. 28 Chevrolet for Pinnacle Racing Group. After qualifying second, he finished sixth after recovering from an early spin.

== Personal life ==
Despite sharing the same surname, he is not related to fellow racing driver Dylan Lupton.

== Motorsports career results ==
=== Stock car career summary ===
Season	Series	Team	Races	Wins	Top 5	Top 10	Points	Position
2026	ARCA Menards Series	Pinnacle Racing Group	1	0	0	1	38	85th

=== ARCA Menards Series ===
(key) (Bold – Pole position awarded by qualifying time. Italics – Pole position earned by points standings or practice time. * – Most laps led. ** – All laps led.)

ARCA Menards Series results
Year	Team	No.	Make	1	2	3	4	5	6	7	8	9	10	11	12	13	14	15	16	17	18	19	20	AMSC	Pts	Ref
2026	Pinnacle Racing Group	28	Chevy	DAY	PHO	KAN	TAL	GLN	TOL	MCH	POC	BER; 6	ELK	CHI	LRP	IRP	IOW	ISF	MAD	DSF	SLM	BRI	KAN	85th	38	

^{*} Season still in progress
