= Andy Jankowiak =

American racing driver (born 1988)

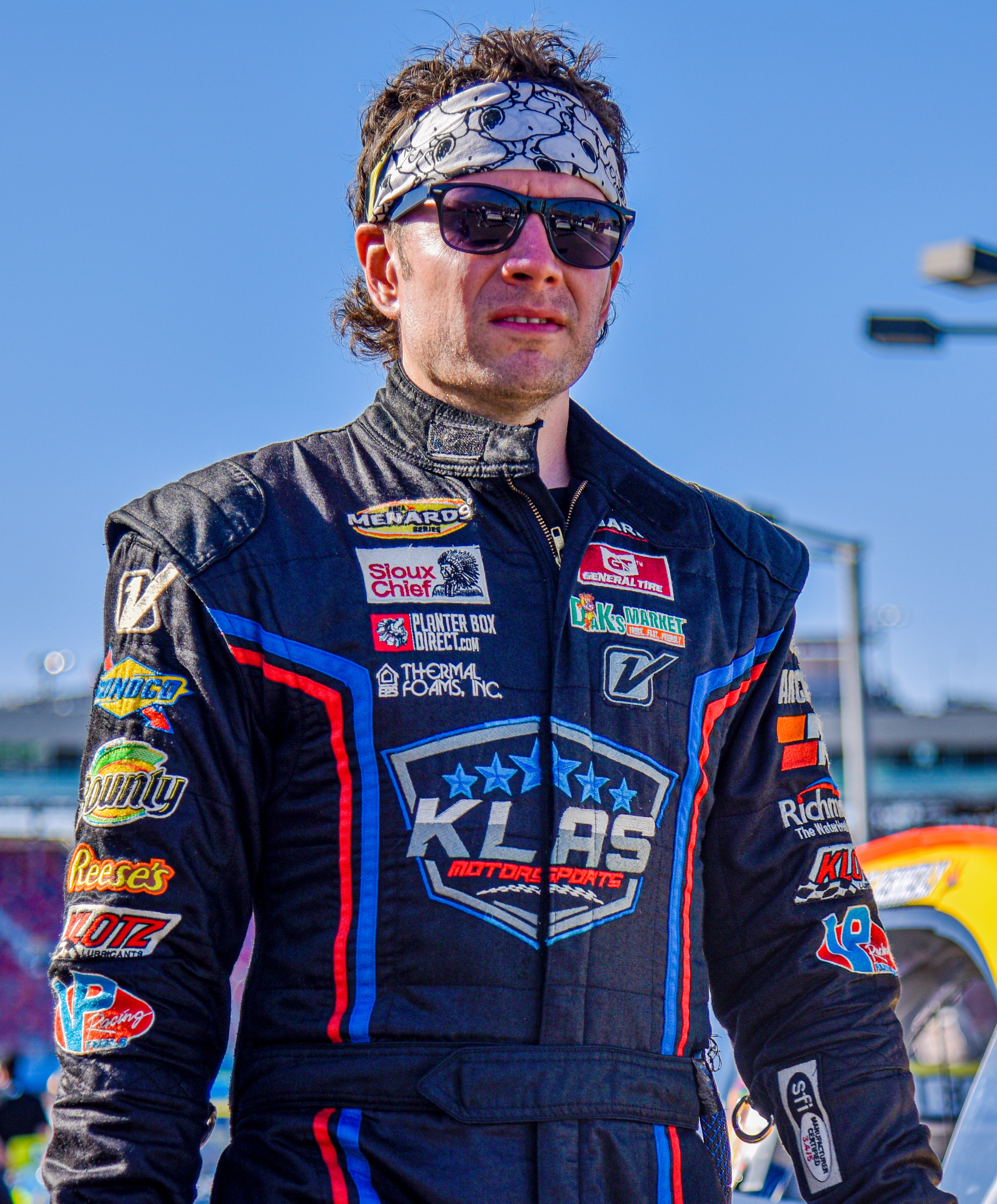
- Jankowiak at Phoenix Raceway in 2026
- Born: Andrew Jankowiak; March 10, 1988 (age 38); Tonawanda, New York, U.S.

NASCAR O'Reilly Auto Parts Series career
- 1 race run over 1 year
- 2026 position: 61st
- Best finish: 61st (2026)
- First race: 2026 Winn-Dixie 250 (Daytona)
Wins	Top tens	Poles
0	0	0

ARCA Menards Series career
- 56 races run over 6 years
- ARCA no., team: No. 71 (KLAS Motorsports)
- Best finish: 12th (2025)
- First race: 2021 Lucas Oil 200 (Daytona)
- Last race: 2026 Menards 150 (Kansas)
- First win: 2026 Alabama Manufactured Housing 200 (Talladega)
Wins	Top tens	Poles
1	30	0

ARCA Menards Series East career
- 11 races run over 6 years
- Best finish: 22nd (2024)
- First race: 2021 Bush's Beans 200 (Bristol)
- Last race: 2026 Bush's Best 200 (Bristol)
Wins	Top tens	Poles
0	8	0

ARCA Menards Series West career
- 3 races run over 3 years
- Best finish: 63rd (2025)
- First race: 2024 General Tire 150 (Phoenix)
- Last race: 2026 General Tire 150 (Phoenix)
Wins	Top tens	Poles
0	0	0

NASCAR Whelen Modified Tour career
- Debut season: 2019
- Former teams: Susanne Lewis Racing; Jankowiak Racing; Steve Mendoza Racing; Jody Lauzon Racing
- Starts: 12
- Wins: 0
- Poles: 0
- Best finish: 32nd in 2021, 2024
- Statistics up to date as of November 7, 2026.

Andrew Jankowiak (born March 10, 1988) is an American professional stock car racing driver. He competes part-time in the ARCA Menards Series, driving the No. 71 Chevrolet for KLAS Motorsports. He has also previously competed in the NASCAR O'Reilly Auto Parts Series and the NASCAR Whelen Modified Tour.

== Personal life ==
Jankowiak's father Tony Jankowiak married Debby Druar after working alongside her on Tommy Druar's pit crew. Jankowiak's mother, father and uncle, Debby Druar Jankowiak, Tony Jankowiak and Tommy Druar, were also racing drivers. Debby Druar Jankowiak was the first female to win a race at the Lancaster Motorplex. Tommy Druar was killed in a Summer 1989 race at Lancaster Motorplex, while the elder Jankowiak was killed in a crash at Stafford Motor Speedway in April 1990. Jankowiak frequently races the number 73 in tribute to his father and uncle. In the 2022 ARCA Menards Series race at Bristol Motor Speedway, Jankowiak raced a special paint scheme inspired by the design his mother used to race.

To fund his racing career, Jankowiak used tips from his job as a delivery driver for Bob & John's La Hacienda.

At a young age, Jankowiak would frequently visit the Ransomville Speedway go-kart track with his mother Debby, and her brother-in-law, Jake.

== Racing career ==
=== NASCAR Modified Tour ===
Jankowiak began to compete in the Modified Tour in 2019, driving for Susanne Lewis Racing. He intended to make his debut at the Musket 250 at New Hampshire Motor Speedway, in the No. 41 Chevrolet, but he withdrew.

Jankowiak returned at the season-finale, the Sunoco World Series 150 at Thompson Speedway Motorsports Park, in the No. 55 Airport Collision Dodge. Jankowiak started 30th out of 40 cars and was collected in a major crash on lap 13, which started when Kyle Bonsignore spun in turn three and blocked the track, causing him to finish 38th.

For 2020, Jankowiak initially entered the Laurel Highlands 150 at Jennerstown Speedway Complex in the No. 59 BNP Machine Dodge for Steve Mendoza Racing, but withdrew.

Jankowiak then competed at the Thompson 150 at Thompson, driving the No. 59 Jankowiak Racing Chevrolet. Jankowiak qualified in 28th (last) place and finished 24th, due to handling issues after 116 of 154 laps.

Jankowiak's third entry was the season-finale, the World Series of Speedway Racing 150 at Thompson, driving for Mendoza again, but in a Chevrolet. He started 17th, but finished 24th out of 27 cars, retiring due to handling issues after 75 of 150 laps.

In 2021, Jankowiak drove in the Nu-Way Auto Parts 150 at New York International Raceway Park, driving the No. 59 BNP Machine Chevrolet for Jody Lauzon Racing, starting 17th and finishing in 14th place (two laps down).

=== ARCA Menards Series ===
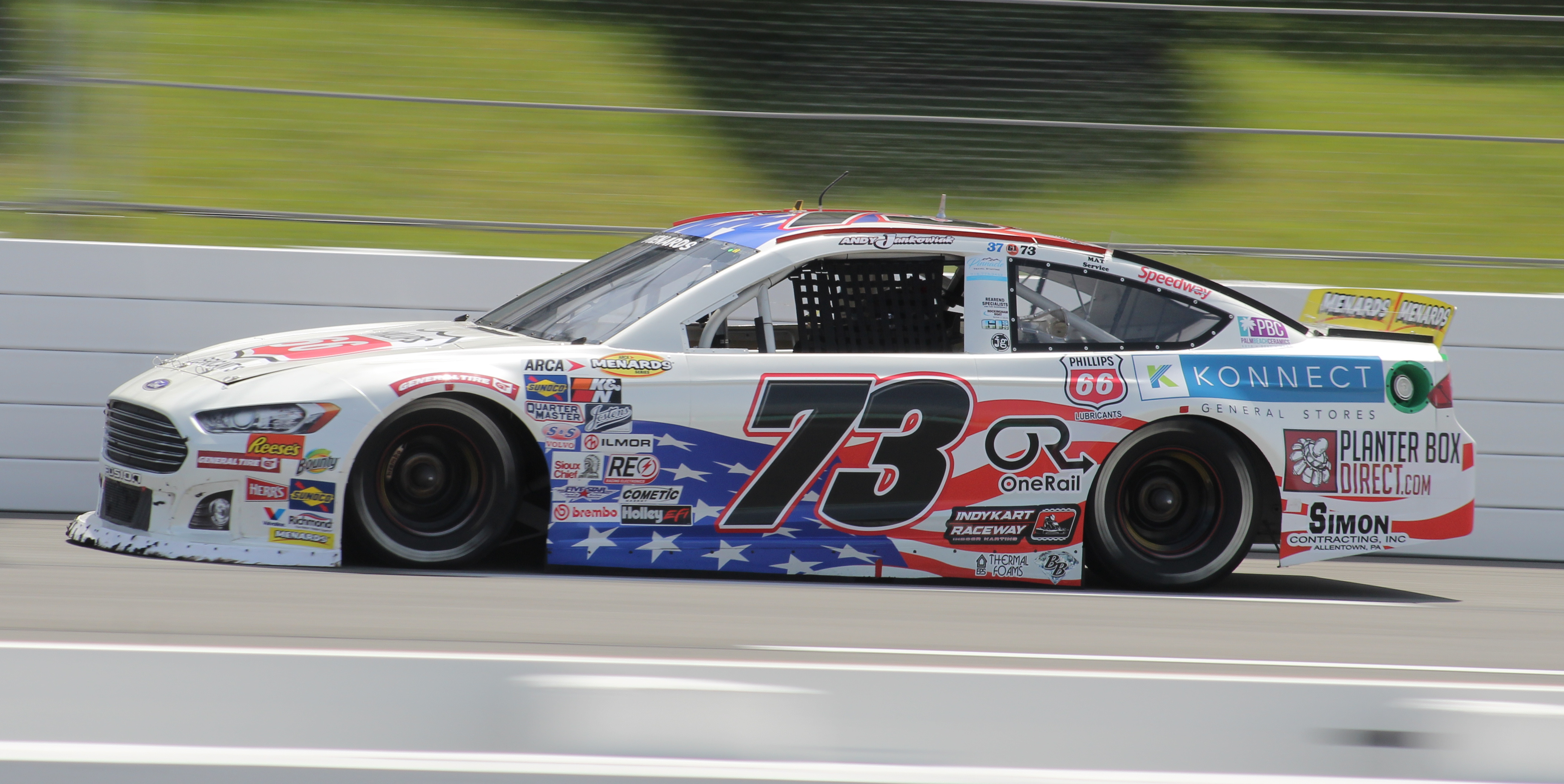
Jankowiak competing at Pocono in 2021.

Jankowiak began to compete in ARCA in 2021, driving the No. 73 entry for his own Jankowiak Motorsports part-time. He purchased a car from Ken Schrader Racing to use.

In the week leading up to the season-opening Lucas Oil 200 at Daytona International Speedway, Jankowiak received sponsorship from OneRail. For the race, Jankowiak qualified in eleventh place out of 34 cars and would finish on the lead lap in eighth.

Jankowiak then competed at the General Tire 200 at Talladega Superspeedway, with sponsorship from V1 Fiber and Thermal Foams. Jankowiak started 27th and would improve his finish to seventh, once again on the lead lap.

At the General Tire 150 at Charlotte Motor Speedway, Jankowiak honored, on his car and helmet, members of the United States Armed Forces from western New York that had been killed in action. With sponsorship from V1 again, he started eighth out of 23 cars and would finish in ninth place, on the lead lap.

Prior to the General Tire #AnywhereIsPossible 200 at Pocono Raceway, Jankowiak received sponsorship from Konnect General Stores through their Phillips 66 distribution. In the field of 24 cars, he started in ninth place and would equal his Talladega finish by finishing seventh, Jankowiak's fourth top-ten and lead lap finish of the season.

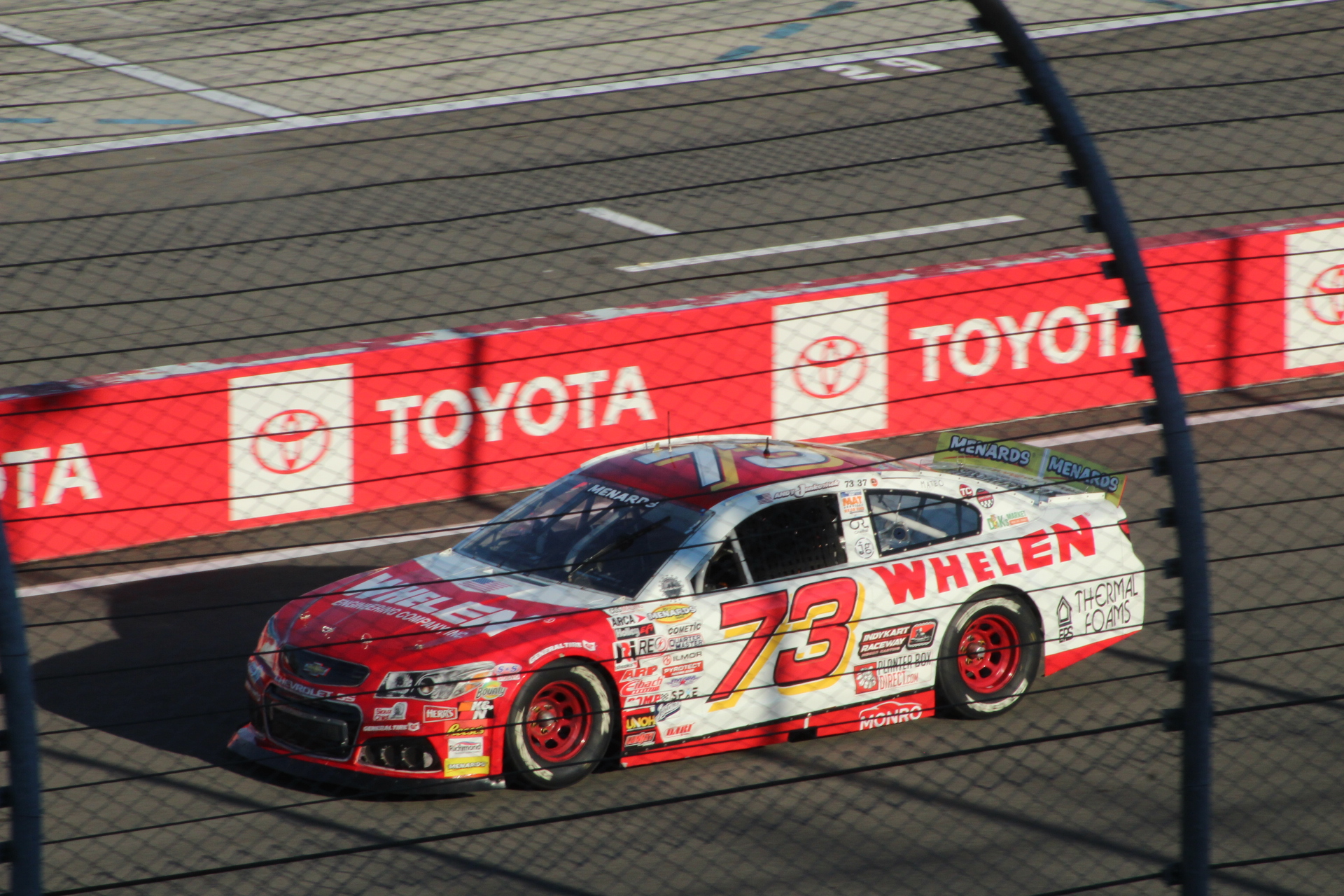
Jankowiak competing at Watkins Glen in 2022.

Jankowiak started his first non-superspeedway oval race when he competed at the road course Watkins Glen International for the Clean Harbors 100 at The Glen. For the race, Marsh Racing collaborated in the fielding of the entry, with continued sponsorship from Konnect via their corporate sibling Dak's Market and Phillips 66. The same car from the oval races was converted to a road course set-up. On his first lap of the combined practice and qualifying session, the rear end on Jankowiak's car blew, causing his team to spend most of the session repairing his car, resulting in them qualifying 27th in the 28 car field. He would finish the race in sixteenth place, albeit two laps down.

On January 19, 2023, it was announced that Jankowiak would return to run part-time in the main ARCA Series in 2023, continuing to drive the No. 73 car, but the ownership of his race team would be taken over by fellow driver Andy Seuss as well as Kevin Lapierre, allowing Jankowiak to focus on the driver role. The team was renamed KLAS Motorsports (the initials of the two new owners).

Jankowiak continued to drive part-time for KLAS Motorsports from 2024 to 2026. He got his first career victory at Talladega in 2026, after making a last lap pass for the lead on Cleetus McFarland and Gus Dean.

=== NASCAR O'Reilly Auto Parts Series ===
On August 15, 2026, KLAS Motorsports, Jankowiak's ARCA team, posted on their Facebook page that he would get to make his debut in the NASCAR O'Reilly Auto Parts Series in the race at Daytona later that month. On August 18, they posted that it would be for RSS Racing.

=== BriSCA F1 ===
In late September 2026, it was confirmed that Jankowiak would make his BriSCA F1 debut at that year's October Speedweekend held at Skegness Raceway, United Kingdom.

== Motorsports career results ==
=== Stock car career summary ===
Season	Series	Team	Races	Wins	Top 5	Top 10	Points	Position
2019	NASCAR Whelen Modified Tour	Susanne Lewis	1	0	0	0	6	75th
2020	NASCAR Whelen Modified Tour	Andy Jankowiak	1	0	0	0	40	39th
2020	NASCAR Whelen Modified Tour	Steve Mendoza	1	0	0	0	40	39th
2021	NASCAR Whelen Modified Tour	Jody Lauzon	3	0	0	2	100	32nd
2021	ARCA Menards Series East	Jankowiak Motorsports	1	0	0	0	18	54th
2021	ARCA Menards Series	Jankowiak Motorsports	7	0	0	4	222	20th
2022	SMART Modified Tour	Riggs Racing	2	0	0	0	0	N/A
2022	ARCA Menards Series East	Jankowiak Motorsports	1	0	0	1	36	44th
2022	ARCA Menards Series	Jankowiak Motorsports	7	0	0	2	207	20th
2023	SMART Modified Tour	Riggs Racing	1	1	1	1	46	39th
2023	NASCAR Whelen Modified Tour	Jody Lauzon	2	0	0	0	42	60th
2023	ARCA Menards Series East	KLAS Motorsports	1	0	0	1	34	40th
2023	ARCA Menards Series	KLAS Motorsports	10	0	2	7	312	14th
2024	NASCAR Whelen Modified Tour	Jody Lauzon	4	0	0	1	110	32nd
2024	ARCA Menards Series West	KLAS Motorsports	1	0	0	0	17	72nd
2024	ARCA Menards Series East	KLAS Motorsports	3	0	1	3	110	22nd
2024	ARCA Menards Series	KLAS Motorsports	11	0	1	6	389	14th
2025	ARCA Menards Series West	KLAS Motorsports	1	0	0	0	30	63rd
2025	ARCA Menards Series East	KLAS Motorsports	2	0	1	1	69	35th
2025	ARCA Menards Series	KLAS Motorsports	9	0	2	5	355	12th
2026	NASCAR Whelen Modified Tour	Steve Mendoza	0	0	0	0	0	N/A
2026	ARCA Menards Series West	KLAS Motorsports	1	0	0	0	26	71st
2026	ARCA Menards Series East	KLAS Motorsports	3	0	0	2	95	25th
2026	ARCA Menards Series	KLAS Motorsports	11	1	1	5	440	14th
2026	NASCAR O'Reilly Auto Parts Series	RSS Racing	1	0	0	0	7	61st

=== NASCAR ===
(key) (Bold – Pole position awarded by qualifying time. Italics – Pole position earned by points standings or practice time. * – Most laps led.)

==== O'Reilly Auto Parts Series ====
NASCAR O'Reilly Auto Parts Series results
Year	Team	No.	Make	1	2	3	4	5	6	7	8	9	10	11	12	13	14	15	16	17	18	19	20	21	22	23	24	25	26	27	28	29	30	31	32	33	NOAPSC	Pts	Ref
2026	RSS Racing	39	Ford	DAY	ATL	COA	PHO	LVS	DAR	MAR	CAR	BRI	KAN	TAL	TEX	GLN	DOV	CLT	NSH	POC	COR	SON	CHI	ATL	IND	IOW	DAY; 30	DAR	GTW	BRI	LVS	CLT	PHO	TAL	MAR	HOM	61st	7	

==== Whelen Modified Tour ====
NASCAR Whelen Modified Tour results
Year	Car owner	No.	Make	1	2	3	4	5	6	7	8	9	10	11	12	13	14	15	16	17	18	NWMTC	Pts	Ref
2019	Susanne Lewis	55	Chevy	MYR	SBO	TMP	STA	WAL	SEE	TMP	RIV	NHA	STA	TMP	OSW	RIV	NHA	STA	TMP; 38			75th	6	
2020	Andy Jankowiak	59	Chevy	JEN	WMM	WMM	JEN	MND	TMP; 24	NHA	STA											39th	40	
2020	Steve Mendoza	59	Chevy									TMP; 24										39th	40	
2021	Jody Lauzon	59	Chevy	MAR	STA	RIV	JEN	OSW	RIV	NHA	NRP; 14	STA	BEE	OSW								32nd	100	
2021	Jody Lauzon	59	Dodge												RCH; 8	RIV; 10	STA					32nd	100	
2023	Jody Lauzon	59	Chevy	NSM	RCH	MON	RIV	LEE	SEE	RIV	WAL	NHA	LMP	THO	LGY	OSW; 13	MON	RIV	NWS	THO	MAR; 33	60th	42	
2024	Jody Lauzon	00	Chevy	NSM	RCH	THO	MON	RIV	SEE	NHA; 27	MON	LMP; 7	THO; 17	OSW; 15	RIV	MON	THO	NWS	MAR			32nd	110	
2026	Jody Lauzon	59	N/A	NSM; Wth	MAR	THO	SEE	RIV	OXF	SEE	CLM	WMM	MON	THO	NHA	STA	OSW	RIV	THO			N/A	0	

=== ARCA Menards Series ===
(key) (Bold – Pole position awarded by qualifying time. Italics – Pole position earned by points standings or practice time. * – Most laps led.)

ARCA Menards Series results
Year	Team	No.	Make	1	2	3	4	5	6	7	8	9	10	11	12	13	14	15	16	17	18	19	20	AMSC	Pts	Ref
2021	Jankowiak Motorsports	73	Ford	DAY; 8	PHO	TAL; 7	KAN	TOL	CLT; 9	MOH	POC; 7	ELK	BLN	IOW	WIN						BRI; 26	SLM	KAN; 13	20th	222	
2021	Jankowiak Motorsports	73	Chevy													GLN; 16	MCH	ISF	MLW	DSF				20th	222	
2022	Jankowiak Motorsports	73	Ford	DAY; 6	PHO	TAL; 13	KAN	CLT; 18	IOW	BLN	ELK	MOH												20th	207	
2022	Jankowiak Motorsports	73	Toyota										POC; 23	IRP	MCH						BRI; 8	SLM	TOL; 11	20th	207	
2022	Jankowiak Motorsports	73	Chevy													GLN; 22	ISF	MLW	DSF	KAN				20th	207	
2023	KLAS Motorsports	73	Ford	DAY; 32	PHO	TAL; 18																		14th	312	
2023	KLAS Motorsports	73	Toyota				KAN; 28	CLT; 5	BLN	ELK	MOH	IOW	POC; 7	MCH; 4	IRP					KAN; 10	BRI; 10	SLM	TOL; 7	14th	312	
2023	KLAS Motorsports	73	Chevy													GLN; 7	ISF	MLW	DSF					14th	312	
2024	KLAS Motorsports	73	Ford	DAY; 10		TAL; 27																		14th	389	
2024	KLAS Motorsports	73	Toyota		PHO; 27		DOV; 7	KAN; 6	CLT; 14	IOW; 5	MOH	BLN	IRP	SLM	ELK	MCH; 19	ISF	MLW	DSF		BRI; 10	KAN; 7	TOL	14th	389	
2024	KLAS Motorsports	73	Chevy																	GLN; 13				14th	389	
2025	KLAS Motorsports	73	Ford	DAY; 8																				12th	355	
2025	KLAS Motorsports	73	Toyota		PHO; 14		KAN; 6	CLT; 5	MCH; 16	BLN	ELK	LRP	DOV	IRP	IOW					BRI; 14	SLM	KAN; 18	TOL	12th	355	
2025	KLAS Motorsports	73	Chevy			TAL; 4										GLN; 7	ISF	MAD	DSF					12th	355	
2026	KLAS Motorsports	71	Chevy	DAY; 10	PHO; 18		TAL; 1	GLN; 13	TOL; 21	MCH; 15	POC; Wth	BER	ELK									BRI; 8		14th	440	
2026	KLAS Motorsports	71	Toyota			KAN; 21								CHI; 7			IOW; 8	ISF	MAD	DSF	SLM		KAN; 6	14th	440	
2026	KLAS Motorsports	71	Ford												LRP; 14	IRP								14th	440	

==== ARCA Menards Series East ====
ARCA Menards Series East results
Year	Team	No.	Make	1	2	3	4	5	6	7	8	AMSEC	Pts	Ref
2021	Jankowiak Motorsports	73	Ford	NSM	FIF	NSV	DOV	SNM	IOW	MLW	BRI; 26	54th	18	
2022	Jankowiak Motorsports	73	Toyota	NSM	FIF	DOV	NSV	IOW	MLW	BRI; 8		44th	36	
2023	KLAS Motorsports	73	Toyota	FIF	DOV	NSV	FRS	IOW	IRP	MLW	BRI; 10	40th	34	
2024	KLAS Motorsports	73	Toyota	FIF	DOV; 7	NSV	FRS	IOW; 5	IRP	MLW	BRI; 10	22nd	110	
2025	KLAS Motorsports	73	Toyota	FIF	CAR; 5	NSV	FRS	DOV	IRP	IOW	BRI; 14	35th	69	
2026	KLAS Motorsports	71	Chevy	HCY	CAR	NSV	TOL; 21	IRP	FRS		BRI; 8	25th	95	
2026	KLAS Motorsports	71	Toyota							IOW; 8		25th	95	

==== ARCA Menards Series West ====
ARCA Menards Series West results
Year	Team	No.	Make	1	2	3	4	5	6	7	8	9	10	11	12	13	AMSWC	Pts	Ref
2024	KLAS Motorsports	73	Toyota	PHO; 27	KER	PIR	SON	IRW	IRW	SHA	TRI	MAD	AAS	KER	PHO		72nd	17	
2025	KLAS Motorsports	73	Toyota	KER	PHO; 14	TUC	CNS	KER	SON	TRI	PIR	AAS	MAD	LVS	PHO		63rd	30	
2026	KLAS Motorsports	71	Chevy	KER	PHO; 18	TUC	SHA	CNS	TRI	SON	PIR	AAS	MAD	LVS	PHO	KER	71st	26	

=== SMART Modified Tour ===
SMART Modified Tour results
Year	Team	No.	Make	1	2	3	4	5	6	7	8	9	10	11	12	13	SMTC	Pts	Ref
2022	Riggs Racing	73	N/A	FLO	SNM	CRW	SBO	FCS	CRW	NWS; 15	NWS; 28	CAR	DOM	HCY	TRI	PUL	N/A	0	
2023	Riggs Racing	73	N/A	FLO	CRW	SBO	HCY	FCS	CRW	ACE	CAR	PUL	TRI	**SBO**; 1	ROU		39th	46	
