= Thomas Annunziata =

American racing driver (born 2005)

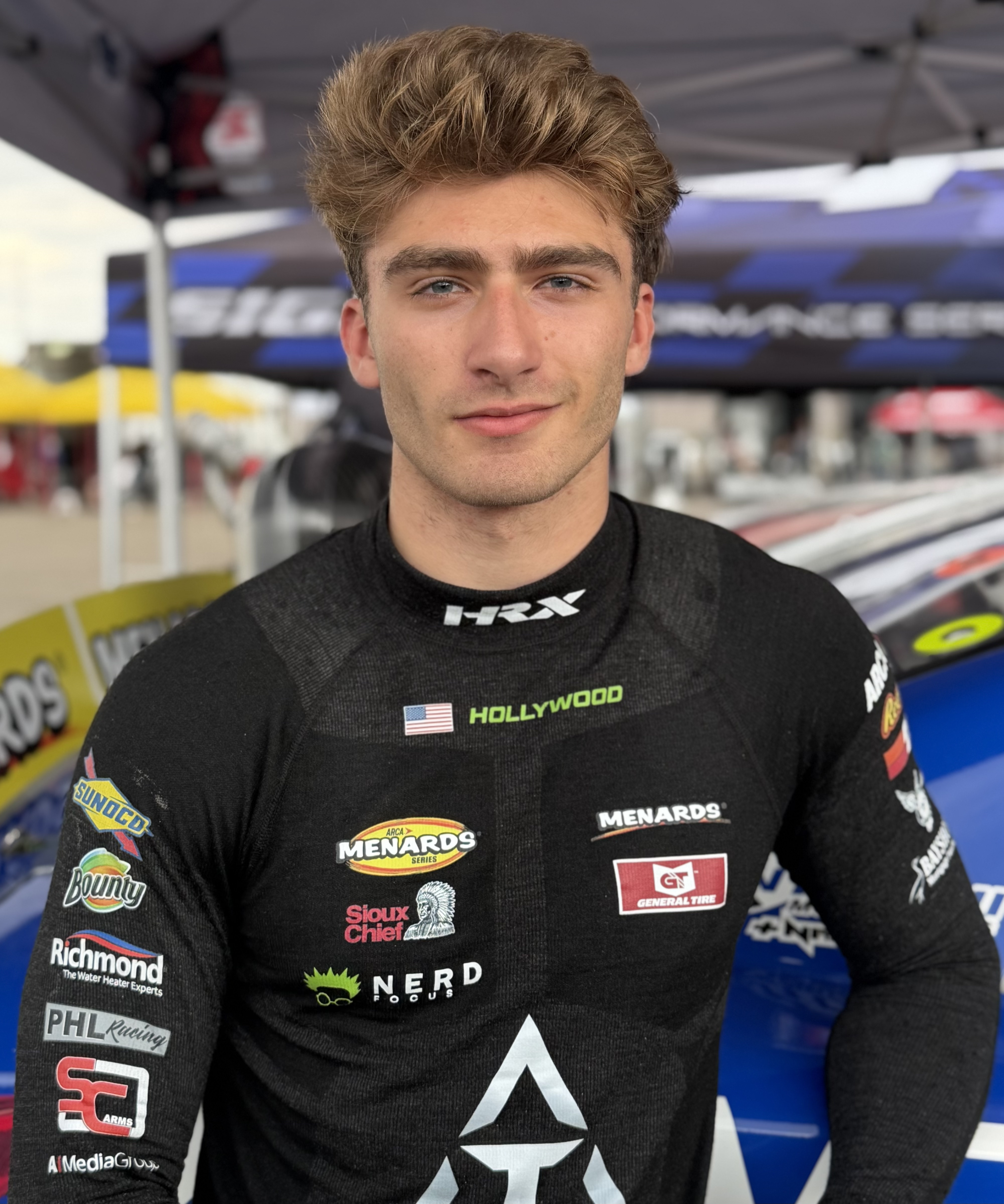
- Annunziata at Las Vegas Motor Speedway in 2025
- Born: Thomas C. Annunziata; June 14, 2005 (age 21); Colts Neck, New Jersey, U.S.
- Achievements: 2026 ARCA Menards Series Champion

NASCAR O'Reilly Auto Parts Series career
- 18 races run over 2 years
- 2025 position: 39th
- Best finish: 39th (2025)
- First race: 2024 Zip Buy Now, Pay Later 250 (Sonoma)
- Last race: 2025 IAA and Ritchie Bros. 250 (Martinsville)
Wins	Top tens	Poles
0	0	0

NASCAR FedEx Freight Truck Series career
- 3 races run over 2 years
- 2026 position: 59th
- Best finish: 59th (2026)
- First race: 2025 LiUNA! 150 (Lime Rock)
- Last race: 2026 Love's RV Stop 225 (Talladega)
Wins	Top tens	Poles
0	0	0

ARCA Menards Series career
- 26 races run over 3 years
- Best finish: 1st (2026)
- First race: 2024 Hard Rock Bet 200 (Daytona)
- Last race: 2026 Menards 150 (Kansas)
- First win: 2025 Lime Rock Park 100 (Lime Rock)
- Last win: 2026 Lime Rock Park ARCA 100 (Lime Rock)
Wins	Top tens	Poles
2	23	3

ARCA Menards Series East career
- 5 races run over 2 years
- Best finish: 12th (2026)
- First race: 2025 Bush's Beans 200 (Bristol)
- Last race: 2026 Bush's Best 200 (Bristol)
Wins	Top tens	Poles
0	5	0

ARCA Menards Series West career
- 4 races run over 2 years
- Best finish: 12th (2025)
- First race: 2025 Portland 112 (Portland)
- Last race: 2026 General Tire 150 (Phoenix)
Wins	Top tens	Poles
0	4	0
- Statistics up to date as of November 6, 2026.

Thomas C. Annunziata (born June 14, 2005) is an American professional stock car racing driver. He last competed full-time in the ARCA Menards Series, driving the No. 70 Toyota Camry for Nitro Motorsports and part-time in the NASCAR Craftsman Truck Series, driving the No. 1/5 Toyota Tundra TRD Pro for Tricon Garage. He has previously competed in the NASCAR O'Reilly Auto Parts Series.

Annunziata is the 2026 ARCA Menards Series champion.

== Racing career ==
=== Early career ===
Annunziata began his racing career in karting, where he raced in series such as the SKUSA, USPKS, and Rok Series, and won three national karting championships before transitioning to cars in 2022.

In 2022, Annunziata raced in the SCCA Spec Miata Class as well as the Mazda Motorsports Spec MX5 Challenge Series and won the two Spec MX5 Championships in his rookie year, which helped him gain a scholarship to the Mazda Motorsports Scholarship Program.

=== Trans Am Series ===
In 2023, Annunziata competed in the Trans Am Series, driving the No. 90 Ford Mustang for Nitro Motorsports, finishing ninth in the final points standings with a win at the final race of the year at the Circuit of the Americas. It was also during this year that he competed in four races in the Carolina Pro Late Model Series, winning two races at Orange County Speedway and Tri-County Speedway. A month after the Trans Am season ended, it was announced that Annunziata would return to Nitro Motorsports in 2024, this time running the full schedule.

=== ARCA Menards Series ===
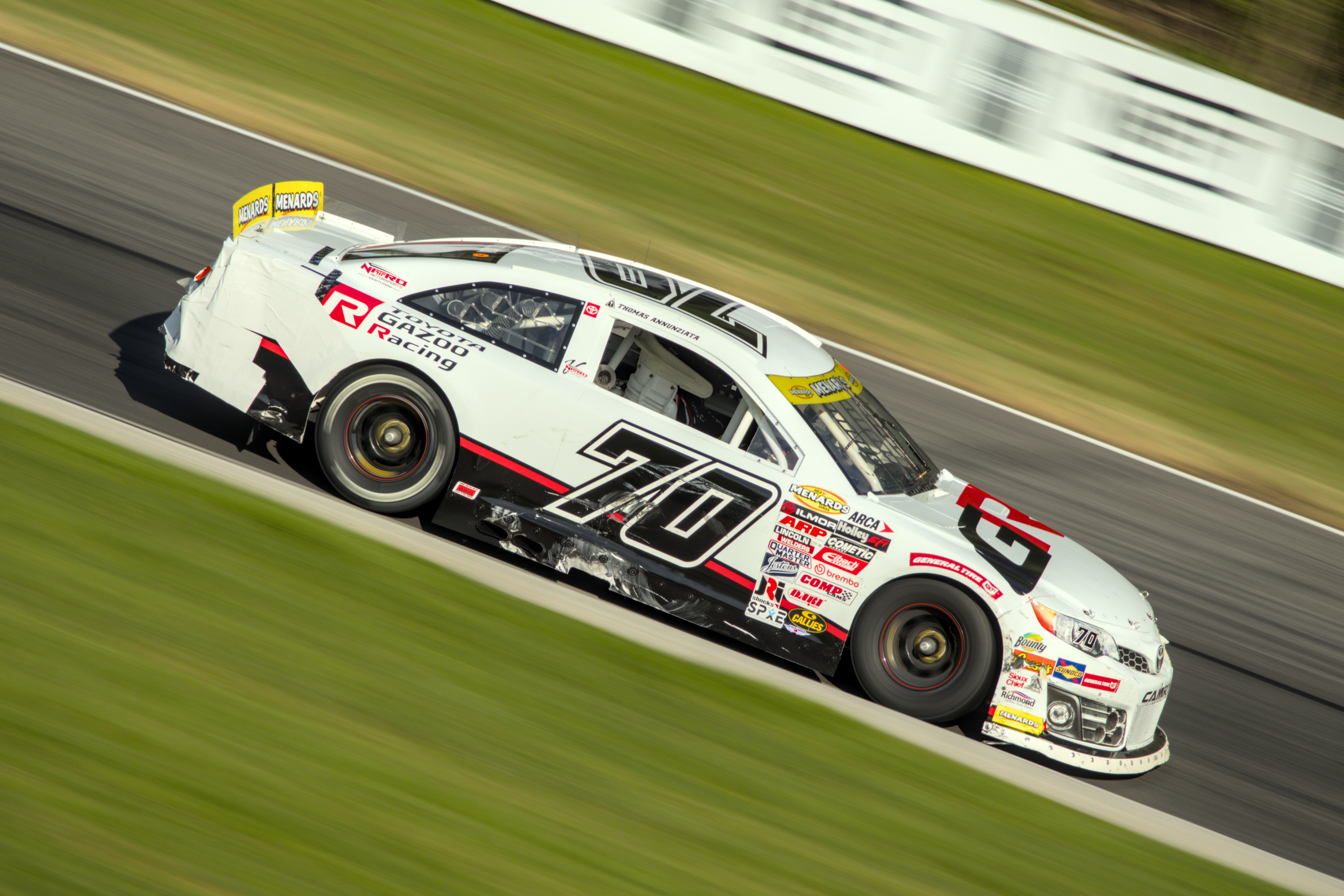
Annunziata's No. 70 car at Lime Rock Park in 2025

In 2024, Annunziata participated in the pre-season test at Daytona International Speedway for the ARCA Menards Series, driving the No. 44 Chevrolet for Ferrier McClure Racing, and placed sixteenth in the overall results between the two testing days, Several days after the test, it was announced that Annunziata will run up to four ARCA races for Ferrier McClure. A month later, Annunziata made his debut in the series, driving the No. 44 at the season opening race at Daytona, where he qualified in eighteenth but finished in second behind race winner Gus Dean. Annunziata would make another start for FMR at Talladega, finishing twelfth.

In 2025, Annunziata would compete at Lime Rock Park for Nitro Motorsports. After starting on pole for the first time, he would end up spinning with Brent Crews on the first lap, but rebounded and earned his first career victory in the series.

In 2026, Annunziata ran full-time in the main ARCA Menards Series, driving the No. 70 Toyota for Nitro Motorsports. With ten top-fives, seventeen top-10s, three pole awards and a win at Lime Rock, he collected enough points to collect the 2026 ARCA Menards Series championship on a tiebreaker over teammate Jake Bollman.

Hours before his 2026 championship, it was confirmed by Annunziata that he would not compete full-time in ARCA for 2027.

=== NASCAR Xfinity Series ===
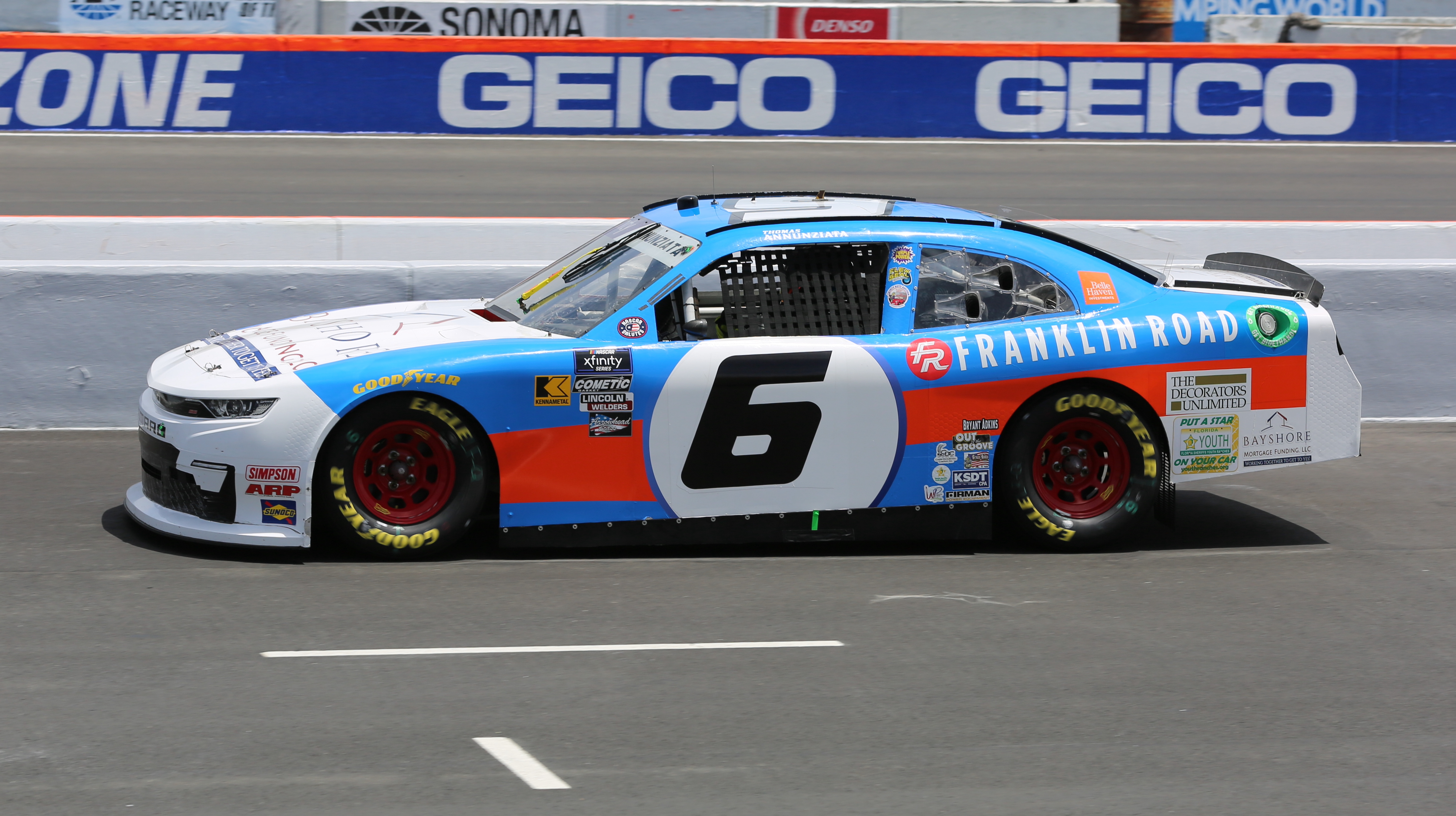
Annunziata's No. 6 car at Sonoma Raceway in 2024

On May 30, 2024, it was announced that Annunziata would make his debut in the NASCAR Xfinity Series in the race at Sonoma Raceway in JD Motorsports No. 6 car.

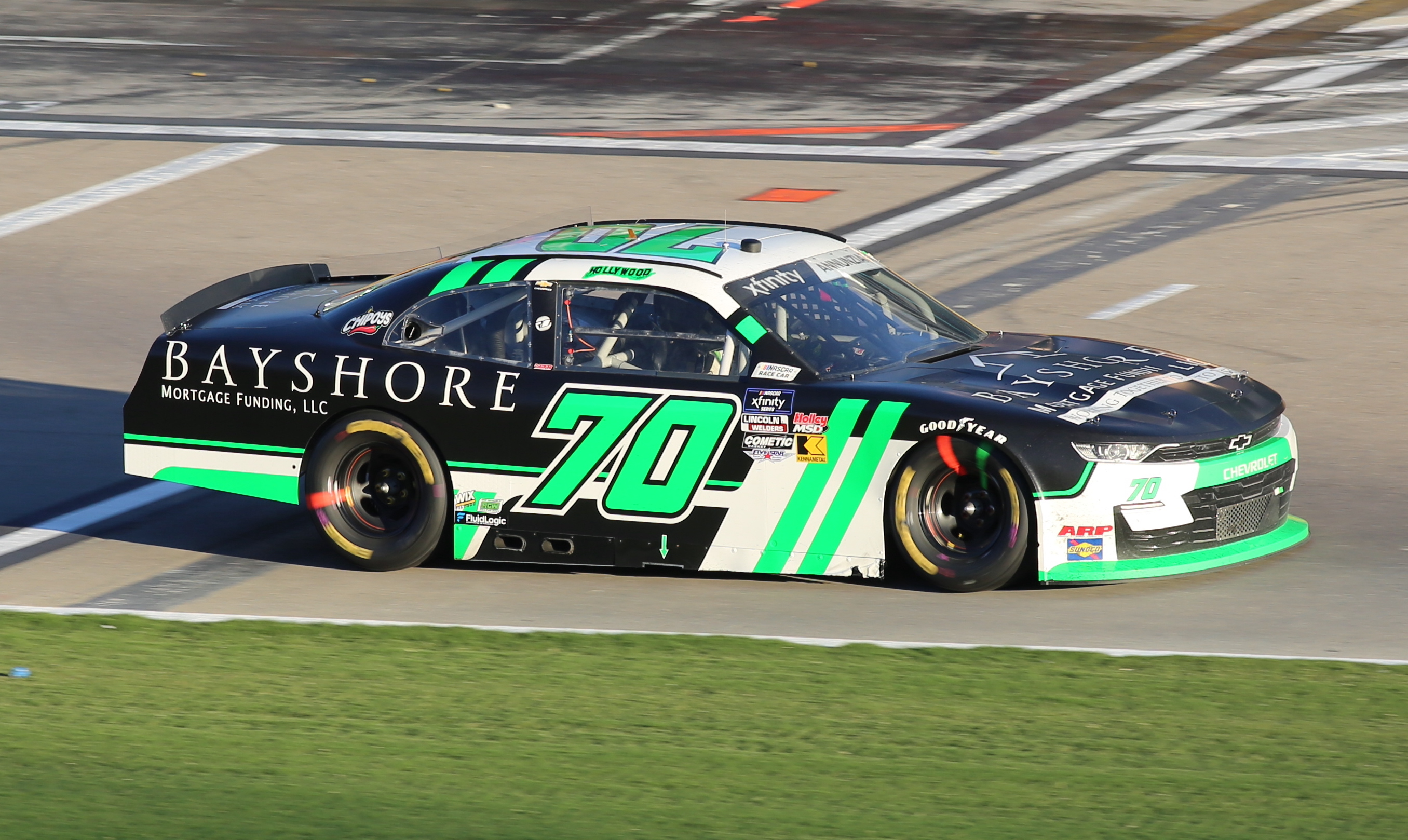
Annunziata's No. 70 car at Las Vegas Motor Speedway in 2025

On January 2, 2025, it was announced that Annunziata would drive the No. 70 Chevrolet SS for the newly rebranded Cope Family Racing team part-time. He would share the ride with Leland Honeyman.

=== NASCAR Craftsman Truck Series ===
In June 2025, it was announced Annunziata would make his NASCAR Craftsman Truck Series debut, driving the No. 07 truck for Spire Motorsports at Lime Rock. He would end up finishing fifteenth in his debut.

On July 3, 2026, it was announced that Annunziata will compete in the No. 1 Toyota Tundra for Tricon Garage at Lime Rock. During that race, Annunziata's truck caught fire and he was transferred to a local hospital.

== Motorsports career results ==
=== Racing career summary ===
Season	Series	Team	Races	Wins	Top 5	Top 10	Points	Position
2022	Trans-Am Series - TA2	Nitro Motorsports	2	0	1	1	26	33rd
2023	Trans-Am Series - TA2	Nitro Motorsports	11	1	5	6	705	9th
2023	Carolina Pro Late Model Series	N/A	4	2	?	?	?	?
2023	Mazda MX-5 Cup	Hixon Motor Sports	14	0	4	9	2850	10th
2024	Trans-Am Series - TA2	Nitro Motorsports	12	1	9	9	990	**3rd**
2024	Trans-Am Series - National	Weaver Racing	2	0	1	2	164	9th
2024	ARCA Menards Series	Ferrier McClure Racing	4	0	2	3	151	31st
2024	NASCAR Xfinity Series	JD Motorsports	2	0	0	0	24	62nd
2024	NASCAR Xfinity Series	Joey Gase Motorsports	3	0	0	0	24	62nd
2025	ARCA Menards Series West	Venturini Motorsports	1	0	1	1	174	12th
2025	ARCA Menards Series West	Nitro Motorsports	2	0	2	2	174	12th
2025	Trans-Am Series - TA2	Nitro Motorsports	9	2	5	6	741	6th
2025	ARCA Menards Series East	Nitro Motorsports	1	0	1	1	39	50th
2025	ARCA Menards Series	Nitro Motorsports	2	1	2	2	88	49th
2025	NASCAR Craftsman Truck Series	Spire Motorsports	1	0	0	0	0	NC†
2025	NASCAR Xfinity Series	Cope Family Racing	13	0	0	0	114	39th
2026	ARCA Menards Series West	Nitro Motorsports	1	0	1	1	41	47th
2026	ARCA Menards Series East	Nitro Motorsports	4	0	2	4	156	12th
2026	ARCA Menards Series	Nitro Motorsports	20	1	11	18	897	**1st**
2026	NASCAR Craftsman Truck Series	TRICON Garage	2	0	0	0	28	59th

^{†} As Annunziata was a guest driver, he was ineligible for championship points.

=== NASCAR ===
(key) (Bold – Pole position awarded by qualifying time. Italics – Pole position earned by points standings or practice time. * – Most laps led.)

==== Xfinity Series ====
NASCAR Xfinity Series results
Year	Team	No.	Make	1	2	3	4	5	6	7	8	9	10	11	12	13	14	15	16	17	18	19	20	21	22	23	24	25	26	27	28	29	30	31	32	33	NXSC	Pts	Ref
2024	JD Motorsports	6	Chevy	DAY	ATL	LVS	PHO	COA	RCH	MAR	TEX	TAL	DOV	DAR	CLT	PIR	SON; 34	IOW	NHA	NSH	CSC; DNQ																62nd	24	
2024	JD Motorsports	4	Chevy																			POC; 28	IND	MCH	DAY	DAR	ATL										62nd	24	
2024	Joey Gase Motorsports	35	Toyota																									GLN; 29	BRI	KAN	TAL	ROV; 34	LVS				62nd	24	
2024	Joey Gase Motorsports	53	Chevy																															HOM; 36	MAR	PHO	62nd	24	
2025	Cope Family Racing	70	Chevy	DAY	ATL	COA; DNQ	PHO; 34	LVS	HOM	MAR; 31	DAR	BRI; 28	CAR; 29	TAL	TEX	CLT	NSH; 20	MXC; 22	POC	ATL	CSC; 17	SON	DOV	IND	IOW; 32	GLN; 37	DAY	PIR; 28	GTW; 20	BRI	KAN	ROV; DNQ	LVS; 38	TAL	MAR; 38	PHO	39th	114	

==== Craftsman Truck Series ====
NASCAR Craftsman Truck Series results
Year	Team	No.	Make	1	2	3	4	5	6	7	8	9	10	11	12	13	14	15	16	17	18	19	20	21	22	23	24	25	NCTC	Pts	Ref
2025	Spire Motorsports	07	Chevy	DAY	ATL	LVS	HOM	MAR	BRI	CAR	TEX	KAN	NWS	CLT	NSH	MCH	POC	LRP; 15	IRP	GLN	RCH	DAR	BRI	NHA	ROV	TAL	MAR	PHO	95th	0^{1}	
2026	Tricon Garage	1	Toyota	DAY	ATL	STP	DAR	ROC	BRI	TEX	GLN	DOV	CLT	NSH	MCH	COR	LRP; 29	NWS	IRP	RCH	NHA	BRI	KAN	CLT	PHO				59th	28	
2026	Tricon Garage	5	Toyota																							TAL; 23	MAR	HOM	59th	28	

^{*} Season still in progress
^{1} Ineligible for series points

=== ARCA Menards Series ===
(key) (Bold – Pole position awarded by qualifying time. Italics – Pole position earned by points standings or practice time. * – Most laps led. ** – All laps led.)

ARCA Menards Series results
Year	Team	No.	Make	1	2	3	4	5	6	7	8	9	10	11	12	13	14	15	16	17	18	19	20	AMSC	Pts	Ref
2024	Ferrier McClure Racing	44	Chevy	DAY; 2	PHO	TAL; 12	DOV	KAN	CLT	IOW														31st	151	
2024	Ferrier McClure Racing	44	Ford								MOH; 4	BLN	IRP	SLM	ELK	MCH	ISF	MLW	DSF	GLN; 7	BRI	KAN	TOL	31st	151	
2025	Nitro Motorsports	70	Toyota	DAY	PHO	TAL	KAN	CLT	MCH	BLN	ELK	**LRP**; 1*	DOV	IRP	IOW	GLN	ISF	MAD	DSF	BRI; 5	SLM	KAN	TOL	49th	88	
2026	Nitro Motorsports	70	Toyota	DAY; 26	PHO; 3	KAN; 9	TAL; 26	GLN; 3	TOL; 2	MCH; 6	POC; 6	**BER**; 2	**ELK**; 7	CHI; 5	LRP; 1*	IRP; 2	IOW; 7	ISF; 3	MAD; 5	DSF; 5	SLM; 7	BRI; 9	KAN; 5	1st	947	

==== ARCA Menards Series East ====
ARCA Menards Series East results
Year	Team	No.	Make	1	2	3	4	5	6	7	8	AMSEC	Pts	Ref
2025	Nitro Motorsports	70	Toyota	FIF	CAR	NSV	FRS	DOV	IRP	IOW	BRI; 5	50th	39	
2026	Nitro Motorsports	70	Toyota	HCY	CAR	NSV	TOL; 2	IRP; 2	FRS	IOW; 7	BRI; 9	12th	156	

==== ARCA Menards Series West ====
ARCA Menards Series West results
Year	Team	No.	Make	1	2	3	4	5	6	7	8	9	10	11	12	13	AMSWC	Pts	Ref
2025	Nitro Motorsports	70	Toyota	KER	PHO	TUC	CNS	KER	SON	TRI	PIR; 2	AAS	MAD		PHO; 3		12th	174	
2025	Venturini Motorsports	15	Toyota											LVS; 4			12th	174	
2026	Nitro Motorsports	70	Toyota	KER	PHO; 3	TUC	SHA	CNS	TRI	SON	PIR	AAS	MAD	LVS	PHO	KER	47th	41	

Sporting positions
Preceded by Brenden Queen	ARCA Menards Series Champion; 2026	Succeeded by Incumbent
