= 2026 Herr's Snacks 200 =

ARCA Menards Series race at Berlin Raceway

Race details
- Race 9 of 20 in the 2026 ARCA Menards Series
- Date: June 20, 2026
- Location: Berlin Raceway in Marne, Michigan
- Course: Permanent racing facility
- Course length: 0.438 miles (0.705 km)
- Distance: 200 laps, 87.6 mi (140.98 km)
- Average speed: 63.542 miles per hour (102.261 km/h)

Pole position
Driver	Thomas Annunziata	Nitro Motorsports
- Time: 16.702

Most laps led
Driver	Max Reaves	Joe Gibbs Racing
- Laps: 162

Fastest lap
Driver	Thomas Annunziata	Nitro Motorsports
- Time: 17.235

Winner
No. 18	Max Reaves	Joe Gibbs Racing

Television in the United States
- Network: FS2
- Announcers: Eric Brennan and Phil Parsons

Radio in the United States
- Radio: ARN

The 2026 Herr's Snacks 200 was an ARCA Menards Series race held on Saturday, June 20, 2026, at Berlin Raceway in Marne, Michigan. Contested over 200 laps on the 0.438-mile (0.705 km) short track, it was the ninth race of the 2026 ARCA Menards Series season, and the 26th running of the event.

Max Reaves, driving for Joe Gibbs Racing, pulled off another dominating performance on the short tracks, leading a race-high 162 laps while holding off a challenging Thomas Annunziata for parts of the event to earn his fourth career ARCA Menards Series win, and his first of the season. Annunziata finished second after starting from the pole, and Jake Bollman finished third. Taylor Reimer and Isabella Robusto rounded out the top five, while Tyler Lupton, Will Robinson, Matt Kemp, Zachary Tinkle, and Jason Kitzmiller rounded out the top ten.

== Report ==
=== Background ===
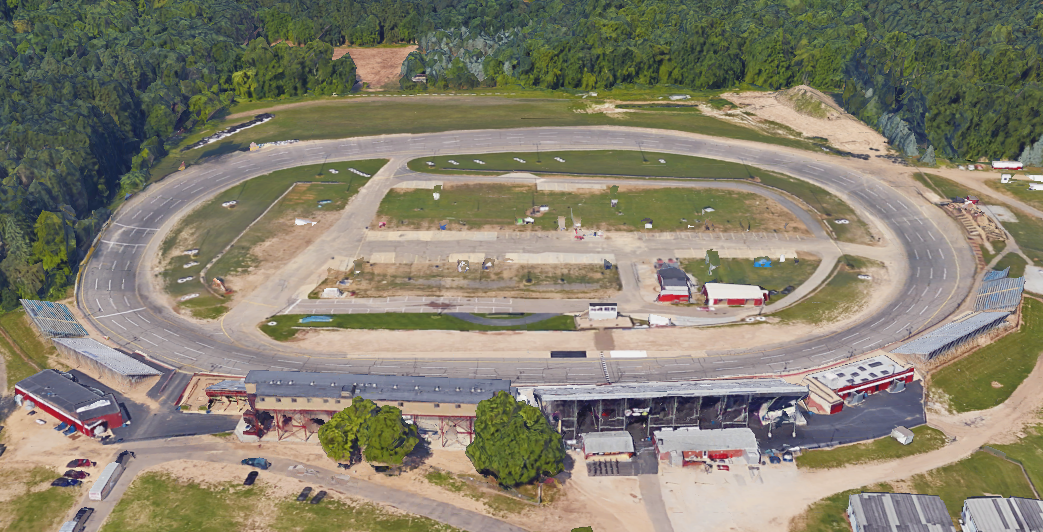
Berlin Raceway, the track where the race will be held.

Berlin Raceway is a 0.438 mi (0.705 km) long paved oval race track in Marne, Michigan, near Grand Rapids. The track races weekly as part of the NASCAR Local Racing Series. It has also held touring series events on the ARCA Menards Series, ARCA Menards Series East, American Speed Association National Tour, USAC Stock Cars, USAC Silver Crown, World of Outlaws Sprint cars, and World of Outlaws Late Model Series tours.

==== Entry list ====
- (R) denotes rookie driver.

#	Driver	Team	Make
03	Alex Clubb	Clubb Racing Inc.	Ford
3	Willie Mullins	Mullins Racing	Ford
06	Nate Moeller	Wayne Peterson Motorsports	Toyota
10	John Clagett	Fast Track Racing	Toyota
11	Matt Kemp	Fast Track Racing	Ford
12	Takuma Koga	Fast Track Racing	Toyota
18	Max Reaves (R)	Joe Gibbs Racing	Toyota
20	Jake Bollman (R)	Nitro Motorsports	Toyota
25	Will Robinson	Nitro Motorsports	Toyota
28	Tyler Lupton	Pinnacle Racing Group	Chevrolet
48	Brad Smith	Brad Smith Motorsports	Ford
53	Zachary Tinkle	Tinkle Family Racing	Toyota
55	Isabella Robusto	Nitro Motorsports	Toyota
70	Thomas Annunziata	Nitro Motorsports	Toyota
77	Taylor Reimer	Pinnacle Racing Group	Chevrolet
81	Kevin Campbell	KC Motorsports	Chevrolet
86	Jeff Maconi (R)	Clubb Racing Inc.	Ford
89	Bobby Dale Earnhardt	Rise Racing	Chevrolet
91	Austin Vaughn	Maples Motorsports	Ford
97	Jason Kitzmiller	CR7 Motorsports	Chevrolet
98	Dale Shearer	Shearer Speed Racing	Toyota
99	Michael Maples	Maples Motorsports	Chevrolet
Official entry list

== Practice ==
The first and only practice session was held on Saturday, June 20, at 3:00 PM EST, and lasted for 45 minutes.

Max Reaves, driving for Joe Gibbs Racing, set the fastest time in the session, with a lap of 16.838 seconds, and a speed of 93.645 miles per hour (150.707 km/h).

=== Practice results ===
Pos.	#	Driver	Team	Make	Time	Speed
1	18	Max Reaves (R)	Joe Gibbs Racing	Toyota	16.838	93.645
2	28	Tyler Lupton	Pinnacle Racing Group	Chevrolet	16.873	93.451
3	77	Taylor Reimer	Pinnacle Racing Group	Chevrolet	16.973	92.900
Full practice results

== Qualifying ==
Qualifying was held on Saturday, June 20, at 4:30 PM EST. The qualifying procedure used was a single-car, two-lap based system. Drivers were on track by themselves and had two laps to post a qualifying time, and whoever set the fastest time won the pole.

Thomas Annunziata, driving for Nitro Motorsports, qualified on pole position with a lap of 16.702 seconds, and a speed of 94.408 miles per hour (151.935 km/h).

=== Qualifying results ===
Pos.	#	Driver	Team	Make	Time	Speed
1	70	Thomas Annunziata	Nitro Motorsports	Toyota	16.702	94.408
2	28	Tyler Lupton	Pinnacle Racing Group	Chevrolet	16.724	94.284
3	18	Max Reaves (R)	Joe Gibbs Racing	Toyota	16.797	93.874
4	20	Jake Bollman (R)	Nitro Motorsports	Toyota	16.856	93.545
5	77	Taylor Reimer	Pinnacle Racing Group	Chevrolet	16.888	93.368
6	11	Matt Kemp	Fast Track Racing	Ford	17.137	92.011
7	25	Will Robinson	Nitro Motorsports	Toyota	17.149	91.947
8	97	Jason Kitzmiller	CR7 Motorsports	Chevrolet	17.231	91.509
9	3	Willie Mullins	Mullins Racing	Ford	17.279	91.255
10	55	Isabella Robusto	Nitro Motorsports	Toyota	17.307	91.108
11	53	Zachary Tinkle	Tinkle Family Racing	Toyota	17.312	91.081
12	12	Takuma Koga	Fast Track Racing	Toyota	17.719	88.989
13	03	Alex Clubb	Clubb Racing Inc.	Ford	17.984	87.678
14	99	Michael Maples	Maples Motorsports	Chevrolet	18.542	85.039
15	89	Bobby Dale Earnhardt	Rise Racing	Chevrolet	18.623	84.669
16	86	Jeff Maconi (R)	Clubb Racing Inc.	Ford	18.803	83.859
17	06	Nate Moeller	Wayne Peterson Motorsports	Toyota	18.946	83.226
18	48	Brad Smith	Brad Smith Motorsports	Ford	19.564	80.597
19	98	Dale Shearer	Shearer Speed Racing	Toyota	19.870	79.356
20	10	John Clagett	Fast Track Racing	Toyota	19.904	79.220
21	91	Austin Vaughn	Maples Motorsports	Ford	—	—
22	81	Kevin Campbell	KC Motorsports	Chevrolet	—	—
Official qualifying results

== Race ==
=== Race results ===
Laps: 200

Fin	St	#	Driver	Team	Make	Laps	Led	Status	Pts
1	3	18	Max Reaves (R)	Joe Gibbs Racing	Toyota	200	162	Running	48
2	1	70	Thomas Annunziata	Nitro Motorsports	Toyota	200	38	Running	44
3	4	20	Jake Bollman (R)	Nitro Motorsports	Toyota	200	0	Running	41
4	5	77	Taylor Reimer	Pinnacle Racing Group	Chevrolet	200	0	Running	40
5	10	55	Isabella Robusto	Nitro Motorsports	Toyota	200	0	Running	39
6	2	28	Tyler Lupton	Pinnacle Racing Group	Chevrolet	200	0	Running	38
7	7	25	Will Robinson	Nitro Motorsports	Toyota	200	0	Running	37
8	6	11	Matt Kemp	Fast Track Racing	Ford	200	0	Running	36
9	11	53	Zachary Tinkle	Tinkle Family Racing	Toyota	199	0	Running	35
10	8	97	Jason Kitzmiller	CR7 Motorsports	Chevrolet	198	0	Running	34
11	9	3	Willie Mullins	Mullins Racing	Ford	198	0	Running	33
12	12	12	Takuma Koga	Fast Track Racing	Toyota	196	0	Running	32
13	13	03	Alex Clubb	Clubb Racing Inc.	Ford	194	0	Running	31
14	14	99	Michael Maples	Maples Motorsports	Chevrolet	192	0	Running	30
15	15	89	Bobby Dale Earnhardt	Rise Racing	Chevrolet	189	0	Running	29
16	17	06	Nate Moeller	Wayne Peterson Motorsports	Toyota	185	0	Running	28
17	19	98	Dale Shearer	Shearer Speed Racing	Toyota	184	0	Running	27
18	18	48	Brad Smith	Brad Smith Motorsports	Ford	183	0	Running	26
19	16	86	Jeff Maconi (R)	Clubb Racing Inc.	Ford	179	0	Running	25
20	21	91	Austin Vaughn	Maples Motorsports	Ford	37	0	Mechanical	24
21	20	10	John Clagett	Fast Track Racing	Toyota	6	0	Mechanical	23
22	22	81	Kevin Campbell	KC Motorsports	Chevrolet	0	0	Did Not Start	22
Official race results

=== Race statistics ===
- Lead changes: 3 among 2 different drivers
- Cautions/Laps: 6 for 42 laps
- Red flags: 0
- Time of race: 1 hour, 22 minutes and 4 seconds
- Average speed: 63.542 miles per hour (102.261 km/h)

== Standings after the race ==
Drivers' Championship standings

	Pos	Driver	Points
	1	Jake Bollman	389
	2	Thomas Annunziata	365 (–24)
1	3	Isabella Robusto	327 (–62)
1	4	Ryan Vargas	315 (–74)
	5	Jason Kitzmiller	312 (–77)
	6	Takuma Koga	296 (–93)
1	7	Michael Maples	279 (–110)
1	8	Andy Jankowiak	263 (–126)
1	9	Alex Clubb	255 (–134)
1	10	Bobby Dale Earnhardt	250 (–139)

- Note: Only the first 10 positions are included for the driver standings.

Previous race: 2026 Sunset Hill Shooting Range 150	ARCA Menards Series; 2026 season	Next race: 2026 Shore Lunch 250
