= Pinnacle Racing Group =

NASCAR team

- Owner(s): Mark Webb; Jerri Webb
- Principal(s): Shane Huffman (Management); Lorin Ranier (Driver dev.); Josh Wise (Driver dev.)
- Base: Mooresville, North Carolina
- Series: ARCA Menards Series; ARCA Menards Series East; ARCA Menards Series West
- Race drivers: ARCA Menards Series: 28. Jack Wood, Carson Brown, Connor Mosack, Tyler Lupton, Landon S. Huffman; 77. Taylor Reimer, Tristan McKee, Lanie Buice; ARCA Menards Series East: 28. Derek Kneeland, Carson Brown (R); 77. Tristan McKee (R); ARCA Menards Series West: 28. Carson Brown, Helio Meza (part-time); 77. Tristan McKee (part-time); 82. Taylor Reimer (part-time); Late Model Stock Cars: 77. Landon S. Huffman, Lanie Buice
- Manufacturer: Chevrolet
- Opened: 2023
- Website: www.pinnacleracinggroup.com

Career
- Debut: ARCA Menards Series: 2023 Calypso Lemonade 150 (Iowa); ARCA Menards Series East: 2023 Pensacola 200 (New Smyrna); ARCA Menards Series West: 2023 Desert Diamond Casino West Valley 100 (Phoenix)
- Latest race: ARCA Menards Series: 2026 Menards 150 (Kansas); ARCA Menards Series East: 2026 Bush's Best 200 (Bristol); ARCA Menards Series West: 2026 Desert Diamond Casino West Valley 100 (Phoenix)
- Races competed: Total: 98; ARCA Menards Series: 60; ARCA Menards Series East: 30; ARCA Menards Series West: 8
- Drivers' Championships: Total: 2 ARCA Menards Series: 1 ARCA Menards Series East: 1 ARCA Menards Series West: 0
- Race victories: Total: 39; ARCA Menards Series: 24; ARCA Menards Series East: 13; ARCA Menards Series West: 2
- Pole positions: Total: 25; ARCA Menards Series: 15; ARCA Menards Series East: 8 ARCA Menards Series West: 2

Pinnacle Racing Group (PRG) (competing as LSH Racing in Late Model competition) is an American professional stock car racing team that currently competes in the ARCA Menards Series, ARCA Menards Series East, ARCA Menards Series West, and in various Late Model Stock events. The team currently fields the No. 28 Chevrolet SS and the No. 77 Chevrolet SS full-time in the ARCA Menards Series.

== History ==
Pinnacle Racing Group was founded on February 4, 2023, by Mark Webb and Jerry Webb in partnership with Shane Huffman and heads of Chevrolet's driver development program, Lorin Ranier and Josh Wise. On March 1 they announced Shane's son, Landon S. Huffman (no relation to fellow driver Landon Huffman) would compete in their Late Model Stock Car for the season at Hickory Motor Speedway. Two days later on March 3, 2023, the team announced Luke Fenhaus would compete for the team full-time in the ARCA Menards Series East in 2023.

== ARCA Menards Series ==
=== Car No. 28 history ===
The team made its ARCA Menards Series debut in the 2023 Calypso Lemonade 150 in a combination race with the East Series where they were competing full-time with Luke Fenhaus. They won the race after it went into overtime marking their first win in the National Series and second with the East Series. On August 14, 2023, it was announced Connor Zilisch would make his ARCA Menards Series debut in the No. 28 at that weekend's race at Watkins Glen. Zilisch qualified second behind Corey LaJoie and then went on to dominate the race, leading 34 out of the race's 42 laps, and barely lost the race after getting moved in the final corner of the final lap from the lead by Jesse Love going on to still finish second despite an ill handling car affected by a broken front sway bar. Carson Kvapil made his ARCA debut at Kansas Speedway, where he finished in second behind race winner Connor Mosack.

In 2024, Shane van Gisbergen would run the No. 28 at Daytona in order to receive approval to compete at superspeedway events in NASCAR. Connor Mosack won the race at Kansas. Zillisch won the race at Dover, Iowa, IRP, Michigan, and The Glen.

On December 4, 2024, it was announced that Brenden Queen would drive the No. 28 Chevrolet in 2025 on a full-time basis. In the season opener at Daytona, Queen scored his first career win in the series. He would earn wins at Kansas in May, Michigan, Dover, Iowa, DuQuion, Salem, and Kansas in September to secure the series championship.

In 2026, Carson Brown, Jack Wood and Connor Mosack will split driving duties of the No. 28 for the full season in the ARCA Menards Series. Brown won at Phoenix, DuQuoin, Bristol, and Kansas. Mosack won at Chicagoland. Tyler Lupton made his ARCA Menards Series debut at his home track at Berlin. Landon S. Huffman would drive the No. 28 at Elko.

==== Car No. 28 results ====
| Year | Driver | No. | Make | 1 | 2 | 3 | 4 | 5 | 6 | 7 | 8 | 9 | 10 | 11 | 12 | 13 | 14 | 15 | 16 | 17 | 18 | 19 | 20 | Owners | Pts |
|---|---|---|---|---|---|---|---|---|---|---|---|---|---|---|---|---|---|---|---|---|---|---|---|---|---|
| 2023 | Luke Fenhaus | 28 | Chevy | DAY | PHO | TAL | KAN | CLT | BLN | ELK | MOH | IOW; 1 | POC | MCH | IRP; 2 | | | MLW; 6 | DSF | | BRI; 29 | SLM | TOL | 23rd | 229 |
| 2023 | Connor Zilisch | 28 | Chevy | | | | | | | | | | | | | GLN; 2* | ISF | | | | | | | 23rd | 229 |
| 2023 | Carson Kvapil | 28 | Chevy | | | | | | | | | | | | | | | | | KAN; 2 | | | | 23rd | 229 |
| 2024 | Shane van Gisbergen | 28 | Chevy | DAY; 29 | | | | | | | | | | | | | | | | | | | | 19th | 519 |
| 2024 | Connor Mosack | 28 | Chevy | | PHO; 4 | TAL | | KAN; 1 | CLT; 27 | | MOH; 13 | BLN | | | | | | | | | | | | 19th | 519 |
| 2024 | Connor Zilisch | 28 | Chevy | | | | DOV; 1 | | | IOW; 1* | | | IRP; 1* | | | MCH; 1 | ISF | MLW; 2 | DSF | GLN; 1* | BRI; 26 | KAN; 2 | TOL | 19th | 519 |
| 2024 | Corey Day | 28 | Chevy | | | | | | | | | | | SLM; 15 | ELK | | | | | | | | | 19th | 519 |
| 2025 | Brenden Queen | 28 | Chevy | DAY; 1 | PHO; 2* | TAL; 25 | KAN; 1* | CLT; 14 | MCH; 1* | BER; 4 | ELK; 2* | LRP; 4 | DOV; 1** | IRP; 3* | IOW; 1* | GLN; 21 | ISF; 4 | MAD; 3 | DSF; 1 | BRI; 3 | SLM; 1 | KAN; 1 | TOL; 2 | 1st | 1034 |
| 2026 | Jack Wood | 28 | Chevy | DAY; 6 | | KAN; 18 | TAL; 9 | | | | | | | | | | | | | | | | | 2nd | 1010 |
| 2026 | Carson Brown | 28 | Chevy | | PHO; 1 | | | GLN; 2 | TOL; 3 | | POC; 3 | | | | LRP; 3 | IRP; 3* | IOW; 2 | ISF; 13 | MAD; 2 | DSF; 1* | SLM; 10 | BRI; 1** | KAN; 1 | 2nd | 1010 |
| 2026 | Connor Mosack | 28 | Chevy | | | | | | | MCH; 4* | | | | CHI; 1* | | | | | | | | | | 2nd | 1010 |
| 2026 | Tyler Lupton | 28 | Chevy | | | | | | | | | BER; 6 | | | | | | | | | | | | 2nd | 1010 |
| 2026 | Landon S. Huffman | 28 | Chevy | | | | | | | | | | ELK; 14* | | | | | | | | | | | 2nd | 1010 |

=== Car No. 77 history ===
In 2026, PRG expanded to a two car operation, fielding the No. 77 car full-time. Taylor Reimer, Tristan McKee, and Lanie Buice would split the driving duties with Kevin Reed Jr. serving as crew chief. McKee won Toledo, Iowa, and Madison.

==== Car No. 77 results ====
| Year | Driver | No. | Make | 1 | 2 | 3 | 4 | 5 | 6 | 7 | 8 | 9 | 10 | 11 | 12 | 13 | 14 | 15 | 16 | 17 | 18 | 19 | 20 | Owners | Pts |
|---|---|---|---|---|---|---|---|---|---|---|---|---|---|---|---|---|---|---|---|---|---|---|---|---|---|
| 2026 | Taylor Reimer | 77 | Chevy | DAY; 30 | | | TAL; 6 | | | | | BER; 4 | ELK; 4 | | | | | ISF; 4 | | DSF; 6 | | | | 3rd | 949 |
| 2026 | Tristan McKee | 77 | Chevy | | PHO; 2 | | | GLN; 18 | TOL; 1* | | | | | | LRP; 7 | IRP; 32 | IOW; 1* | | MAD; 1* | | SLM; 6 | BRI; 2 | | 3rd | 949 |
| 2026 | Lanie Buice | 77 | Chevy | | | KAN; 5 | | | | MCH; 5 | POC; 5 | | | CHI; 2 | | | | | | | | | KAN; 4 | 3rd | 949 |

=== Car No. 82 history ===
In 2024, the team fielded the No. 82 car for Carson Kvapil at Dover and Charlotte and Corey Day at Bristol and Kansas.

On January 8, 2025, the team announced that Brazilian IndyCar driver Hélio Castroneves would drive the No. 82 at the Daytona ARCA 200 to prepare for the Daytona 500. Later that season, Austin Green was assigned to drive the No. 82 car part-time. He would earn a win at Charlotte.

==== Car No. 82 results ====
| Year | Driver | No. | Make | 1 | 2 | 3 | 4 | 5 | 6 | 7 | 8 | 9 | 10 | 11 | 12 | 13 | 14 | 15 | 16 | 17 | 18 | 19 | 20 | Owners | Pts |
|---|---|---|---|---|---|---|---|---|---|---|---|---|---|---|---|---|---|---|---|---|---|---|---|---|---|
| 2024 | Carson Kvapil | 82 | Chevy | DAY | PHO | TAL | DOV; 3 | KAN | CLT; 2* | IOW | MOH | BLN | IRP | SLM | ELK | MCH | ISF | MLW | DSF | GLN | | | | 27th | 162 |
| 2024 | Corey Day | 82 | Chevy | | | | | | | | | | | | | | | | | | BRI; 7 | KAN; 4 | TOL | 27th | 162 |
| 2025 | Hélio Castroneves | 82 | Chevy | DAY; 5 | PHO | TAL | KAN | | | | | | | | | | | | | | | | | 22nd | 241 |
| 2025 | Austin Green | 82 | Chevy | | | | | CLT; 1* | MCH | BLN | ELK | LRP | DOV | | | | | | | | | | | 22nd | 241 |
| 2025 | Connor Mosack | 82 | Chevy | | | | | | | | | | | IRP; 6 | IOW | GLN | ISF | | | | | | | 22nd | 241 |
| 2025 | Tristan McKee | 82 | Chevy | | | | | | | | | | | | | | | MAD; 11 | DSF | BRI; 2 | SLM | KAN | TOL; 3 | 22nd | 241 |

== ARCA Menards Series East ==
=== Car No. 28 history ===
The team made its debut in the ARCA Menards Series East in the 2023 Pensacola 200 with Luke Fenhaus behind the wheel, they would finish a strong 2nd to a debuting William Sawalich. The team would pick up another top-five the next race at Dover with a third and then in only their third career start they won their first ever race at the Nashville Fairgrounds Speedway in the Music City 200. Two races later in a combination race with the East Series and the main ARCA Menards Series, marking their first start in that division, they won once again at Iowa Speedway in the Calypso Lemonade 150.

On March 18, 2024, it was announced that Connor Zilisch will run a full season in the ARCA Menards Series East, driving the No. 28 car. In his first start at Five Flags Speedway, he missed practice and qualifying due to being at Circuit of the Americas for the NASCAR Truck Series race, and was replaced by Luke Fenhaus. Zilisch was able to make the race but struggled with mechanical issues throughout the event and finished fourth, two laps down. In his next race at Dover Motor Speedway, Zilisch took advantage of the leader's mishaps, and led the final 42 laps of the event to earn his first career win in both the main and East Series. At the Nashville Fairgrounds Speedway, Zilisch qualified fourth and ran in the top-three throughout the event, but did not have the car to beat the eventual race winner William Sawalich, he finished third behind Isabella Robusto. He rebounded the following race at Flat Rock Speedway, where he would go on to obliterate the competition, winning the pole and leading every lap of the race to earn his second career win. He continued with a hot streak of victories, winning the next two East Series events at Iowa Speedway and Lucas Oil Indianapolis Raceway Park, both in dominating fashion.

In 2025, the No. 28 car in the ARCA Menards Series East was reduced to part-time basis. Connor Mosack drove the No. 28 car at season opener at Five Flags Speedway. Austin Green drove the car to a 12th place finish at Rockinghan. Brenden Queen drove the No. 28 car for four combined ARCA Menards Series races at Dover, IRP, Iowa, and Bristol. He won at Dover and Iowa.

On December 17, 2025, it was announced that Carson Brown would drive the No. 28 full-time in 2026. Due to scheduling conflict, he would miss the first race at Hickory. As the result, he would be replaced by Richard Childress Racing's spotter Derek Kneeland. Brown won the season finale at Bristol.

==== Car No. 28 results ====
| Year | Driver | No. | Make | 1 | 2 | 3 | 4 | 5 | 6 | 7 | 8 | Owners | Pts |
|---|---|---|---|---|---|---|---|---|---|---|---|---|---|
| 2023 | Luke Fenhaus | 28 | Chevy | FIF; 2 | DOV; 3 | NSV; 1 | FRS; 5 | IOW; 1 | IRP; 2 | MLW; 6 | BRI; 29 | 2nd | 362 |
| 2024 | Connor Zilisch | 28 | Chevy | FIF; 4 | DOV; 1 | NSV; 3 | FRS; 1** | IOW; 1* | IRP; 1* | MLW; 2 | BRI; 26 | 2nd | 390 |
| 2025 | Connor Mosack | 28 | Chevy | FIF; 4 | | | | | | | | 7th | 304 |
| 2025 | Austin Green | 28 | Chevy | | CAR; 12 | NSH | FRS | | | | | 7th | 304 |
| 2025 | Brenden Queen | 28 | Chevy | | | | | DOV; 1** | IRP; 3* | IOW; 1* | BRI; 3 | 7th | 304 |
| 2026 | Derek Kneeland | 28 | Chevy | HCY; 4 | | | | | | | | 3rd | 422 |
| 2026 | Carson Brown | 28 | Chevy | | ROC; 2 | NSV; 9 | TOL; 3 | IRP; 3* | FRS; 18 | IOW; 2 | BRI; 1** | 3rd | 422 |

=== Car No. 77 history ===
On December 17, 2025, it was announced that Tristan McKee would drive the No. 77 full-time in 2026. He won at Hickory, Rockingham, Toledo, and Iowa. He finished second at season finale at Bristol, he earned the 2026 ARCA Menards Series East championship title over Max Reaves.

==== Car No. 77 results ====
| Year | Driver | No. | Make | 1 | 2 | 3 | 4 | 5 | 6 | 7 | 8 | Owners | Pts |
|---|---|---|---|---|---|---|---|---|---|---|---|---|---|
| 2026 | Tristan McKee | 77 | Chevy | HCY; 1 | CAR; 1** | NSV; 3 | TOL; 1* | IRP; 32 | FRS; 2 | IOW; 1* | BRI; 2 | 1st | 431 |

=== Car No. 82 results ===
In 2024, the team fielded the No. 82 car for Carson Kvapil at Dover. He finished hird.

In 2025, the No. 82 car was driven by Connor Mosack at IRP and Tristan McKee at Bristol.

==== Car No. 82 results ====
| Year | Driver | No. | Make | 1 | 2 | 3 | 4 | 5 | 6 | 7 | 8 | Owners | Pts |
|---|---|---|---|---|---|---|---|---|---|---|---|---|---|
| 2024 | Carson Kvapil | 82 | Chevy | FIF | DOV; 3 | NSV | FRS | IOW | IRP | MLW | | 27th | 78 |
| 2024 | Corey Day | 82 | Chevy | | | | | | | | BRI; 7 | 27th | 78 |
| 2025 | Connor Mosack | 82 | Chevy | FIF | CAR | NSH | FRS | DOV | IRP; 6 | IOW | | 28th | 80 |
| 2025 | Tristan McKee | 82 | Chevy | | | | | | | | BRI; 2 | 28th | 80 |

== ARCA Menards Series West ==
=== Car No. 28 history ===
The team made its debut in the ARCA Menards Series West in the 2023 season finale at Phoenix Raceway with Jack Wood behind the wheel. He finished fourth.

In 2024, Connor Mosack and Connor Zilisch drove the No. 28 car. At the season opener at Phoenix, Mosack finished fourth and at the season finale, Zilisch finished first.

In 2025, Brenden Queen and Carson Brown drove the No. 28 car. At the second race of the season at Phoenix, Queen finishes 2nd after led the most laps. At the season finale, Brown also finished 2nd.

In 2026, Brown would drive the No. 28 at Phoenix where he won the race. In September 2026, it was revealed that Helio Meza will make his debut in the ARCA Menards Series West at the Las Vegas Motor Speedway Bullring, driving the No. 28 car. Meza would also drive the No. 28 at fall Phoenix race.

==== Car No. 28 results ====
| Year | Driver | No. | Make | 1 | 2 | 3 | 4 | 5 | 6 | 7 | 8 | 9 | 10 | 11 | 12 | 13 | AMSC | Pts |
|---|---|---|---|---|---|---|---|---|---|---|---|---|---|---|---|---|---|---|
| 2023 | Jack Wood | 28 | Chevy | PHO | IRW | KCR | PIR | SON | IRW | SHA | EVG | AAS | LVS | MAD | PHO; 4 | | 38th | 40 |
| 2024 | Connor Mosack | 28 | Chevy | PHO; 4 | KER | PIR | SON | IRW | IRW | SHA | TRI | MAD | AAS | KER | | | 27th | 88 |
| 2024 | Connor Zilisch | 28 | Chevy | | | | | | | | | | | | PHO; 1* | | 27th | 88 |
| 2025 | Brenden Queen | 28 | Chevy | KER | PHO; 2* | TUC | CNS | KER | SON | TRI | PIR | AAS | MAD | LVS | | | 33rd | 44 |
| 2025 | Carson Brown | 28 | Chevy | | | | | | | | | | | | PHO; 2 | | 33rd | 44 |
| 2026 | Carson Brown | 28 | Chevy | KER | PHO; 1 | TUC | SHA | CNS | TRI | SON | PIR | AAS | MAD | | | | -* | -* |
| 2026 | Helio Meza | 28 | Chevy | | | | | | | | | | | LVS; 18 | PHO; 23 | KER | -* | -* |

=== Car No. 77 history ===
In 2026, the team fielded the No. 77 car at Phoenix for Tristan McKee.

==== Car No. 77 results ====
| Year | Driver | No. | Make | 1 | 2 | 3 | 4 | 5 | 6 | 7 | 8 | 9 | 10 | 11 | 12 | 13 | AMSC | Pts |
|---|---|---|---|---|---|---|---|---|---|---|---|---|---|---|---|---|---|---|
| 2026 | Tristan McKee | 77 | Chevy | KER | PHO; 2 | TUC | SHA | CNS | TRI | SON | PIR | AAS | MAD | LVS | PHO | KER | -* | -* |

=== Car No. 82 history ===
In 2026, the team fielded the No. 82 car at fall Phoenix race for Taylor Reimer.

==== Car No. 82 results ====
| Year | Driver | No. | Make | 1 | 2 | 3 | 4 | 5 | 6 | 7 | 8 | 9 | 10 | 11 | 12 | 13 | AMSC | Pts |
|---|---|---|---|---|---|---|---|---|---|---|---|---|---|---|---|---|---|---|
| 2026 | Taylor Reimer | 82 | Chevy | KER | PHO | TUC | SHA | CNS | TRI | SON | PIR | AAS | MAD | LVS | PHO; 2 | KER | -* | -* |

== Late Model Stock Cars ==
=== 2023 ===
Landon S. Huffman, son of team manager Shane Huffman, ran the team's Late Model Stock Car for the entire season at Hickory Motor Speedway. Huffman and the team picked up their first victory on March 12 at Hickory in the first twin 40 race of the night. The team later picked up their second win on July 2 also at Hickory.

Later in the season, Connor Mosack and Ross Chastain also raced Late Model Stock Cars for the team at Hickory and North Wilkesboro respectively.
