= 2026 Atlas 200 =

ARCA Menards Series race at the Madison International Speedway

Race details
- Race 16 of 20 in the 2026 ARCA Menards Series
- Date: August 28, 2026
- Location: Madison International Speedway in Rutland, Wisconsin
- Course: Permanent racing facility
- Course length: 0.500 miles (0.850 km)
- Distance: 200 laps, 100 mi (160.934 km)
- Average speed: 68.913 miles per hour (110.905 km/h)

Pole position
Driver	Carson Brown	Pinnacle Racing Group
- Time: 18.218

Most laps led
Driver	Tristan McKee	Pinnacle Racing Group
- Laps: 105

Fastest lap
Driver	Tristan McKee	Pinnacle Racing Group
- Time: 18.627

Winner
No. 77	Tristan McKee	Pinnacle Racing Group

Television in the United States
- Network: FS1
- Announcers: Eric Brennan and Phil Parsons

Radio in the United States
- Radio: ARN

The 2026 Atlas 200 was an ARCA Menards Series race held on Friday, August 28, 2026, at Madison International Speedway in Rutland, Wisconsin. Contested over 200 laps on the 0.500-mile (0.805 km) short track, it was the 16th race of the 2026 ARCA Menards Series season, and the second running of the event.

Tristan McKee, driving for Pinnacle Racing Group, took the lead from Max Reaves shortly after halfway, and led the remaining laps while surviving late restarts to earn his fourth career ARCA Menards Series win, and his third of the season. Pole-sitter Carson Brown finished second, and Reaves finished third. Jake Bollman and Thomas Annunziata rounded out the top five, while Isaac Kitzmiller, Isabella Robusto, Will Robinson, Jason Kitzmiller, and Tony Cosentino rounded out the top ten.

== Report ==
=== Background ===
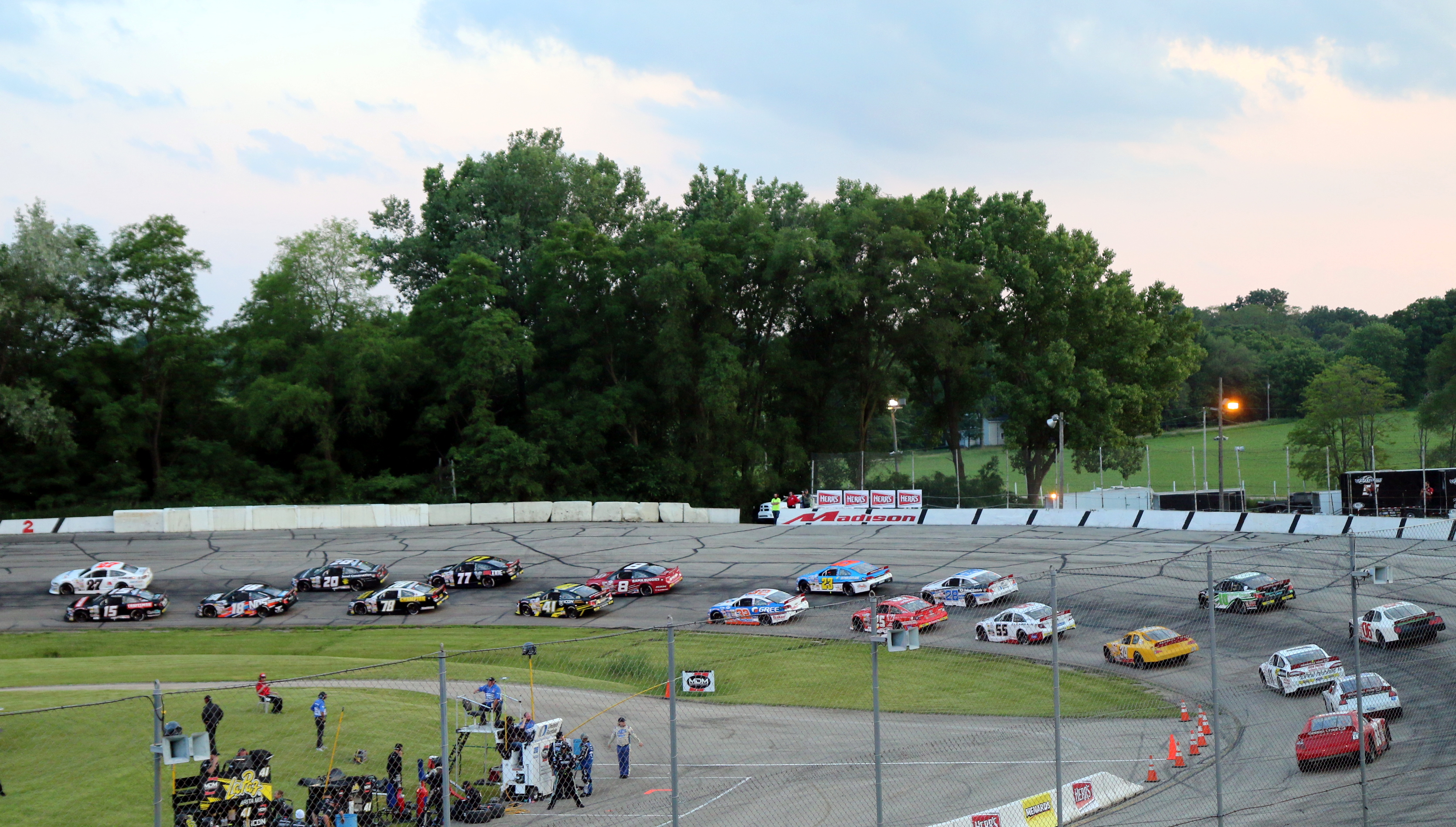
Madison International Speedway, the track where the race was held.

Madison International Speedway is a half-mile paved oval racetrack in the Town of Rutland near Oregon, Wisconsin, United States. With 18-degree banked turns, the track is billed as "The Track of Champions" and "Wisconsin's Fastest Half Mile." The weekly program at the track runs on Friday nights under NASCAR Local Racing Series sanction.

The track holds events in the ASA Midwest Tour and ASA Late Model Series Northern Division. In 2011, the track held its first ARCA Racing Series race since 1973. The track regularly held American Speed Association events before the national touring series ended. The United States Super Trucks, Mid-American Stock Car Series, the HOSS series, the USAC midgets, the ASA National Tour, the NASCAR Midwest Series and the USAR Hooters Pro Cup Series have appeared in the past.

==== Entry list ====
- (R) denotes rookie driver.

#	Driver	Team	Make
03	Alex Clubb	Clubb Racing Inc.	Ford
06	Daniel Sasnett	Wayne Peterson Motorsports	Ford
10	Tony Cosentino	Fast Track Racing	Toyota
11	Mike Basham	Fast Track Racing	Ford
12	Takuma Koga	Fast Track Racing	Toyota
18	Max Reaves (R)	Joe Gibbs Racing	Toyota
20	Jake Bollman (R)	Nitro Motorsports	Toyota
25	Will Robinson	Nitro Motorsports	Toyota
28	Carson Brown (R)	Pinnacle Racing Group	Chevrolet
36	Ty Fredrickson	Team 36	Toyota
42	Taylor Mayhew	Cook Racing Technologies	Chevrolet
48	Brad Smith	Brad Smith Motorsports	Ford
55	Isabella Robusto	Nitro Motorsports	Toyota
70	Thomas Annunziata	Nitro Motorsports	Toyota
77	Tristan McKee	Pinnacle Racing Group	Chevrolet
79	Isaac Kitzmiller	ACR Motorsports	Chevrolet
81	Kevin Campbell	KC Motorsports	Chevrolet
86	Jeff Maconi (R)	Clubb Racing Inc.	Ford
91	Austin Vaughn	Maples Motorsports	Ford
97	Jason Kitzmiller	CR7 Motorsports	Chevrolet
99	Michael Maples	Maples Motorsports	Chevrolet
Official entry list

== Practice ==
The first and only practice session was held on Friday, August 28, at 3:30 PM CST, and lasted for 45 minutes.

Carson Brown, driving for Pinnacle Racing Group, set the fastest time in the session, with a lap of 18.422 seconds, and a speed of 97.709 miles per hour (157.247 km/h).

Pos.	#	Driver	Team	Make	Time	Speed
1	28	Carson Brown (R)	Pinnacle Racing Group	Chevrolet	18.422	97.709
2	18	Max Reaves (R)	Joe Gibbs Racing	Toyota	18.658	96.473
3	77	Tristan McKee	Pinnacle Racing Group	Chevrolet	18.715	96.180
Full practice results

== Qualifying ==
Qualifying was held on Friday, August 28, at 5:15 PM CST. The qualifying procedure used was a single-car, two-lap based system. Drivers were on track by themselves and had two laps to post a qualifying time, and whoever set the fastest time won the pole.

Carson Brown, driving for Pinnacle Racing Group, qualified on pole position with a lap of 18.218 seconds, and a speed of 98.803 miles per hour (159.008 km/h).

=== Qualifying results ===
Pos.	#	Driver	Team	Make	Time	Speed
1	28	Carson Brown (R)	Pinnacle Racing Group	Chevrolet	18.218	98.803
2	77	Tristan McKee	Pinnacle Racing Group	Chevrolet	18.248	98.641
3	18	Max Reaves (R)	Joe Gibbs Racing	Toyota	18.354	98.071
4	70	Thomas Annunziata	Nitro Motorsports	Toyota	18.402	97.815
5	20	Jake Bollman (R)	Nitro Motorsports	Toyota	18.490	97.350
6	79	Isaac Kitzmiller	ACR Motorsports	Chevrolet	18.538	97.098
7	36	Ty Fredrickson	Team 36	Toyota	18.631	96.613
8	55	Isabella Robusto	Nitro Motorsports	Toyota	18.672	96.401
9	42	Taylor Mayhew	Cook Racing Technologies	Chevrolet	18.700	96.257
10	25	Will Robinson	Nitro Motorsports	Toyota	18.717	96.169
11	97	Jason Kitzmiller	CR7 Motorsports	Chevrolet	18.807	95.709
12	12	Takuma Koga	Fast Track Racing	Toyota	19.067	94.404
13	10	Tony Cosentino	Fast Track Racing	Toyota	19.328	93.129
14	91	Austin Vaughn	Maples Motorsports	Ford	19.451	92.540
15	99	Michael Maples	Maples Motorsports	Chevrolet	19.544	92.100
16	03	Alex Clubb	Clubb Racing Inc.	Ford	19.957	90.194
17	11	Mike Basham	Fast Track Racing	Ford	19.996	90.018
18	06	Daniel Sasnett	Wayne Peterson Motorsports	Ford	20.463	87.964
19	81	Kevin Campbell	KC Motorsports	Chevrolet	21.309	84.471
20	86	Jeff Maconi (R)	Clubb Racing Inc.	Ford	21.389	84.155
21	48	Brad Smith	Brad Smith Motorsports	Ford	—	—
Official qualifying results

== Race ==
=== Race results ===
Laps: 200

Fin	St	#	Driver	Team	Make	Laps	Led	Status	Pts
1	2	77	Tristan McKee	Pinnacle Racing Group	Chevrolet	200	105	Running	48
2	1	28	Carson Brown (R)	Pinnacle Racing Group	Chevrolet	200	0	Running	43
3	3	18	Max Reaves (R)	Joe Gibbs Racing	Toyota	200	95	Running	42
4	5	20	Jake Bollman (R)	Nitro Motorsports	Toyota	200	0	Running	40
5	4	70	Thomas Annunziata	Nitro Motorsports	Toyota	200	0	Running	39
6	6	79	Isaac Kitzmiller	ACR Motorsports	Chevrolet	200	0	Running	38
7	8	55	Isabella Robusto	Nitro Motorsports	Toyota	200	0	Running	37
8	10	25	Will Robinson	Nitro Motorsports	Toyota	200	0	Running	36
9	11	97	Jason Kitzmiller	CR7 Motorsports	Chevrolet	200	0	Running	35
10	13	10	Tony Cosentino	Fast Track Racing	Toyota	197	0	Running	34
11	12	12	Takuma Koga	Fast Track Racing	Toyota	195	0	Running	33
12	14	91	Austin Vaughn	Maples Motorsports	Ford	193	0	Running	32
13	17	11	Mike Basham	Fast Track Racing	Ford	188	0	Running	31
14	18	06	Daniel Sasnett	Wayne Peterson Motorsports	Ford	186	0	Running	30
15	16	03	Alex Clubb	Clubb Racing Inc.	Ford	184	0	Running	29
16	9	42	Taylor Mayhew	Cook Racing Technologies	Chevrolet	183	0	Mechanical	28
17	20	86	Jeff Maconi (R)	Clubb Racing Inc.	Ford	183	0	Running	27
18	15	99	Michael Maples	Maples Motorsports	Chevrolet	177	0	Running	26
19	7	36	Ty Fredrickson	Team 36	Toyota	156	0	Accident	25
20	19	81	Kevin Campbell	KC Motorsports	Chevrolet	3	0	Mechanical	24
21	21	48	Brad Smith	Brad Smith Motorsports	Ford	0	0	Mechanical	23
Official race results

=== Race statistics ===
- Lead changes: 3 among 2 different drivers
- Cautions/Laps: 6 for 36 laps
- Red flags: 0
- Time of race: 1 hour, 27 minutes and 0 seconds
- Average speed: 68.913 miles per hour (110.905 km/h)

== Standings after the race ==
Drivers' Championship standings

Pos	Driver	Points
1	Jake Bollman	751
2	Thomas Annunziata	746 (–5)
3	Isabella Robusto	635 (–116)
4	Jason Kitzmiller	629 (–122)
5	Takuma Koga	588 (–163)
6	Michael Maples	537 (–214)
7	Alex Clubb	530 (–221)
8	Brad Smith	463 (–288)
9	Jeff Maconi	438 (–313)
10	Bobby Dale Earnhardt	410 (–341)

- Note: Only the first 10 positions are included for the driver standings.

Previous race: 2026 Calypso 100	ARCA Menards Series; 2026 season	Next race: 2026 Audubon Park 100
