= Lorin Ranier =

American racing team owner

- Born: Lorin Ranier; June 26, 1965 (age 60); Prestonburg, Kentucky, U.S.
- Occupations: Driver development, chevrolet
- Years active: 1995–present
- Employer(s): Chevrolet, Drivers Edge Development, Pinnacle Racing Group

Lorin Ranier (born June 26, 1965), is an American businessman. He is best known as the former owner of the NASCAR team Ranier Racing with MDM and for currently serving as the head of Chevrolet's driver development with the Drivers Edge Development program and Pinnacle Racing Group. He is the son of former NASCAR team owner Harry Ranier.

== Racing career ==
Ranier started spotting for various teams across NASCAR's top 3 divisions in 1995. By 2010 he was spotting for David Ragan in the No. 6 for Roush-Fenway Racing.

In 2015 Ranier had started back up his fathers team, Ranier-Lundy Racing in partnership with Mike Hillman. The next year in 2016 Ranier in partnership with MDM Motorsports would reopen their NASCAR Camping World Truck Series program which had closed in 1997.

When Ranier reopened his race team in 2015 he created along with it a driver development program called Ranier Racing Development which is still in use today as it serves as Chevrolet's program for their driver development. Others in the Chevrolet camp in NASCAR have also used his services in recent years including JR Motorsports and GMS Racing through their Drivers Edge Development program which Ranier spearheaded from 2019 to 2022 and most recently Pinnacle Racing Group in 2023.

== Personal life ==
Ranier graduated Lafayette Senior High School in 1983.

Ranier is the son of the late Harry Ranier who most famously owned the No. 28 for Cale Yarborough in the NASCAR Winston Cup Series from 1983 to 1986.
