= 2026 Ashley Furniture 150 =

ARCA Menards Series race at Chicagoland Speedway

Race details
- Race 11 of 20 in the 2026 ARCA Menards Series
- Date: July 3, 2026
- Location: Chicagoland Speedway in Joliet, Illinois
- Course: Permanent racing facility
- Course length: 1.5 miles (2.4 km)
- Distance: 100 laps, 150 mi (241.402 km)
- Average speed: 119.947 miles per hour (193.036 km/h)

Pole position
Driver	Thomas Annunziata	Nitro Motorsports
- Grid positions set by competition-based formula

Most laps led
Driver	Connor Mosack	Pinnacle Racing Group
- Laps: 71

Fastest lap
Driver	Connor Mosack	Pinnacle Racing Group
- Time: 31.641

Winner
No. 28	Connor Mosack	Pinnacle Racing Group

Television in the United States
- Network: FS1
- Announcers: Brent Stover, Phil Parsons, and Trevor Bayne

Radio in the United States
- Radio: MRN
- Booth announcers: Alex Hayden and Mike Bagley
- Turn announcers: Kurt Becker (1–2) and Tim Catalfamo (3–4)

The 2026 Ashley Furniture 150 was an ARCA Menards Series race held on Friday, July 3, 2026, at Chicagoland Speedway in Joliet, Illinois. Contested over 100 laps on the 1.5-mile (2.4 km) asphalt oval, it was the eleventh race of the 2026 ARCA Menards Series season, and the 20th running of the event and the first since 2019.

Connor Mosack, driving for Pinnacle Racing Group, made a three-wide pass on Thomas Annunziata and Lanie Buice for the lead early in the event, and led the remaining 71 laps in dominating fashion to earn his third career ARCA Menards Series win, and his first of the season. Buice finished second, becoming only the fifth female driver in series history to finish runner-up in ARCA competition. Landon S. Huffman finished third, with Daniel Dye and Annunziata rounding out the top five. Jade Avedisian, Andy Jankowiak, Jake Bollman, Jason Kitzmiller, and Kyle Steckly rounded out the top ten.

== Report ==
=== Background ===
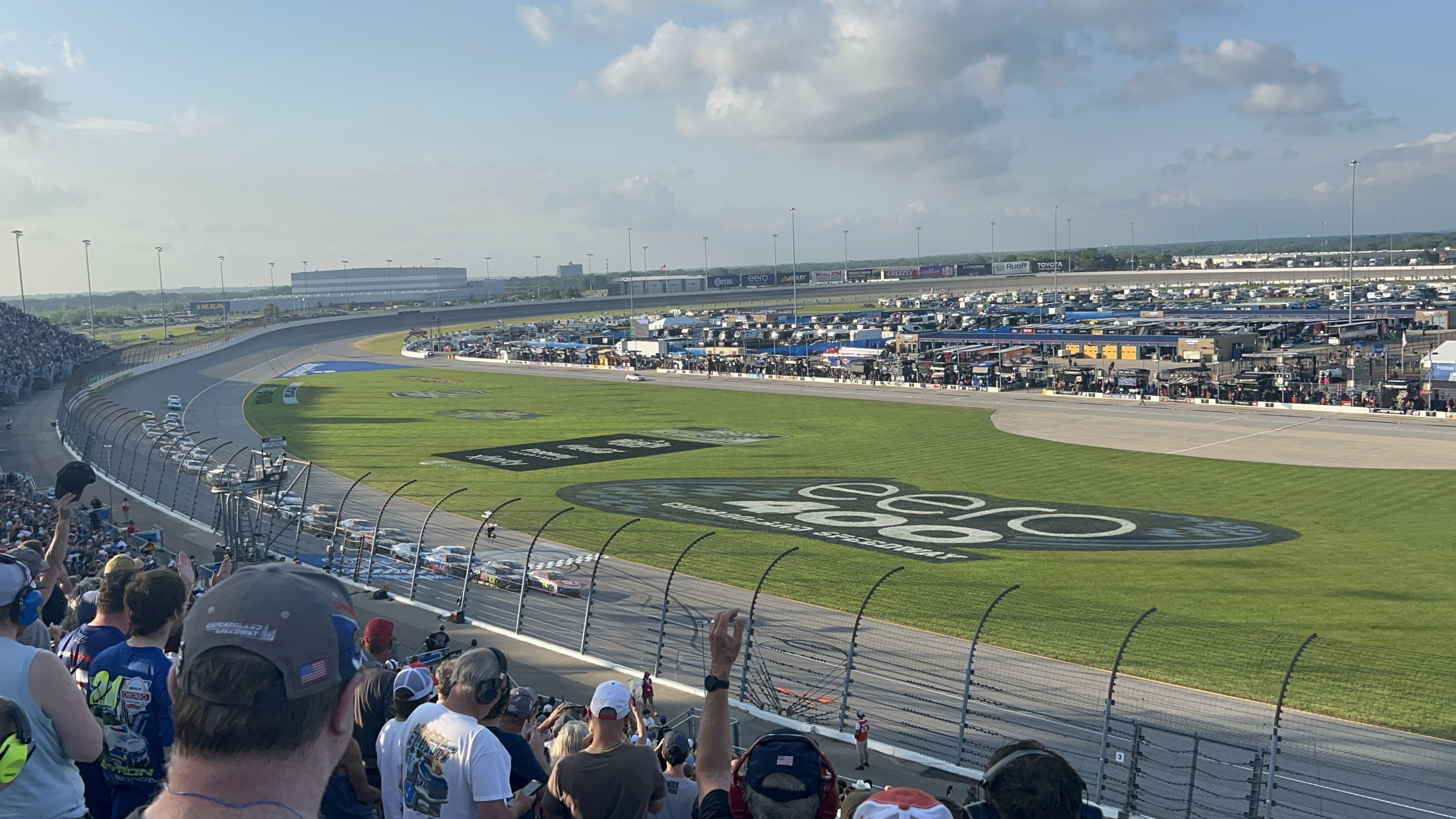
Chicagoland Speedway, the track where the race was held.

Chicagoland Speedway is a 1.5 miles (2.4 km) tri-oval speedway in Joliet, Illinois, southwest of Chicago. The speedway opened in 2001 and currently hosts NASCAR racing. Until 2011, the speedway also hosted the IndyCar Series, recording numerous close finishes including the closest finish in IndyCar history. The speedway is owned and operated by International Speedway Corporation and located adjacent to Route 66 Raceway.

The race marked the ARCA Menards Series' return to Chicagoland Speedway for the first time since 2019.

==== Entry list ====
- (R) denotes rookie driver.

#	Driver	Team	Make
2	Kyle Steckly	RAFA Racing Team	Toyota
03	Alex Clubb	Clubb Racing Inc.	Ford
06	Brayton Laster	Wayne Peterson Motorsports	Chevrolet
9	Landon S. Huffman	CR7 Motorsports	Chevrolet
10	Dustin Hillenburg	Fast Track Racing	Chevrolet
11	Tim Monroe	Fast Track Racing	Ford
12	Takuma Koga	Fast Track Racing	Toyota
15	Jade Avedisian	Nitro Motorsports	Toyota
18	William Sawalich	Joe Gibbs Racing	Toyota
19	Matt Kemp	Maples Motorsports	Chevrolet
20	Jake Bollman (R)	Nitro Motorsports	Toyota
24	Daniel Dye	SPS Racing	Chevrolet
25	Gavan Boschele (R)	Nitro Motorsports	Toyota
27	Tim Richmond	Tim Richmond Racing	Toyota
28	Connor Mosack	Pinnacle Racing Group	Chevrolet
48	Brad Smith	Brad Smith Motorsports	Ford
55	Isabella Robusto	Nitro Motorsports	Toyota
69	Landon Brown	Kimmel Racing	Ford
70	Thomas Annunziata	Nitro Motorsports	Toyota
71	Andy Jankowiak	KLAS Motorsports	Toyota
77	Lanie Buice	Pinnacle Racing Group	Chevrolet
83	Nate Moeller	Clubb Racing Inc.	Ford
86	Jeff Maconi (R)	Clubb Racing Inc.	Ford
89	Bobby Dale Earnhardt	Rise Racing	Chevrolet
91	Morgen Baird	Maples Motorsports	Ford
97	Jason Kitzmiller	CR7 Motorsports	Chevrolet
99	Michael Maples	Maples Motorsports	Chevrolet
Official entry list

== Practice ==
The first and only practice session was held on Friday, July 3, at 1:00 PM CST, and lasted for 1 hour and 20 minutes.

Thomas Annunziata, driving for Nitro Motorsports, set the fastest time in the session, with a lap of 30.981 seconds, and a speed of 174.300 miles per hour (280.509 km/h).

=== Practice results ===
Pos.	#	Driver	Team	Make	Time	Speed
1	70	Thomas Annunziata	Nitro Motorsports	Toyota	30.981	174.300
2	24	Daniel Dye	SPS Racing	Chevrolet	31.648	170.627
3	20	Jake Bollman (R)	Nitro Motorsports	Toyota	31.729	170.191
Full practice results

== Starting lineup ==
Qualifying was originally scheduled to be held on Friday, July 3, at 2:35 PM CST, but was cancelled due to inclement weather. The starting lineup was determined by practice speeds. As a result, Thomas Annunziata, driving for Nitro Motorsports, was awarded the pole position.

=== Starting lineup ===
Pos.	#	Driver	Team	Make
1	70	Thomas Annunziata	Nitro Motorsports	Toyota
2	24	Daniel Dye	SPS Racing	Chevrolet
3	20	Jake Bollman (R)	Nitro Motorsports	Toyota
4	77	Lanie Buice	Pinnacle Racing Group	Chevrolet
5	97	Jason Kitzmiller	CR7 Motorsports	Chevrolet
6	28	Connor Mosack	Pinnacle Racing Group	Chevrolet
7	25	Gavan Boschele (R)	Nitro Motorsports	Toyota
8	18	William Sawalich	Joe Gibbs Racing	Toyota
9	9	Landon S. Huffman	CR7 Motorsports	Chevrolet
10	71	Andy Jankowiak	KLAS Motorsports	Toyota
11	2	Kyle Steckly	RAFA Racing Team	Toyota
12	15	Jade Avedisian	Nitro Motorsports	Toyota
13	55	Isabella Robusto	Nitro Motorsports	Toyota
14	27	Tim Richmond	Tim Richmond Racing	Toyota
15	69	Landon Brown	Kimmel Racing	Ford
16	12	Takuma Koga	Fast Track Racing	Toyota
17	99	Michael Maples	Maples Motorsports	Chevrolet
18	91	Morgen Baird	Maples Motorsports	Ford
19	89	Bobby Dale Earnhardt	Rise Racing	Chevrolet
20	06	Brayton Laster	Wayne Peterson Motorsports	Chevrolet
21	11	Tim Monroe	Fast Track Racing	Ford
22	86	Jeff Maconi (R)	Clubb Racing Inc.	Ford
23	10	Dustin Hillenburg	Fast Track Racing	Chevrolet
24	19	Matt Kemp	Maples Motorsports	Chevrolet
25	03	Alex Clubb	Clubb Racing Inc.	Ford
26	48	Brad Smith	Brad Smith Motorsports	Ford
27	83	Nate Moeller	Clubb Racing Inc.	Ford
Official starting lineup

== Race ==
=== Race results ===
Laps: 100

Fin	St	#	Driver	Team	Make	Laps	Led	Status	Pts
1	6	28	Connor Mosack	Pinnacle Racing Group	Chevrolet	100	71	Running	48
2	4	77	Lanie Buice	Pinnacle Racing Group	Chevrolet	100	5	Running	43
3	9	9	Landon S. Huffman	CR7 Motorsports	Chevrolet	100	0	Running	41
4	2	24	Daniel Dye	SPS Racing	Chevrolet	100	0	Running	40
5	1	70	Thomas Annunziata	Nitro Motorsports	Toyota	100	24	Running	41
6	12	15	Jade Avedisian	Nitro Motorsports	Toyota	100	0	Running	38
7	10	71	Andy Jankowiak	KLAS Motorsports	Toyota	100	0	Running	37
8	3	20	Jake Bollman (R)	Nitro Motorsports	Toyota	100	0	Running	36
9	5	97	Jason Kitzmiller	CR7 Motorsports	Chevrolet	100	0	Running	35
10	11	2	Kyle Steckly	RAFA Racing Team	Toyota	99	0	Running	34
11	14	27	Tim Richmond	Tim Richmond Racing	Toyota	99	0	Running	33
12	7	25	Gavan Boschele (R)	Nitro Motorsports	Toyota	99	0	Running	32
13	13	55	Isabella Robusto	Nitro Motorsports	Toyota	99	0	Running	31
14	18	91	Morgen Baird	Maples Motorsports	Ford	98	0	Running	30
15	15	69	Landon Brown	Kimmel Racing	Ford	97	0	Running	29
16	16	12	Takuma Koga	Fast Track Racing	Toyota	93	0	Running	28
17	23	10	Dustin Hillenburg	Fast Track Racing	Chevrolet	92	0	Running	27
18	22	86	Jeff Maconi (R)	Clubb Racing Inc.	Ford	90	0	Running	26
19	19	89	Bobby Dale Earnhardt	Rise Racing	Chevrolet	89	0	Running	25
20	20	06	Brayton Laster	Wayne Peterson Motorsports	Chevrolet	85	0	Running	24
21	17	99	Michael Maples	Maples Motorsports	Chevrolet	83	0	Running	23
22	25	03	Alex Clubb	Clubb Racing Inc.	Ford	29	0	Mechanical	22
23	21	11	Tim Monroe	Fast Track Racing	Ford	26	0	Mechanical	21
24	8	18	William Sawalich	Joe Gibbs Racing	Toyota	25	0	Accident	20
25	26	48	Brad Smith	Brad Smith Motorsports	Ford	8	0	Mechanical	19
26	24	19	Matt Kemp	Maples Motorsports	Chevrolet	5	0	Mechanical	18
27	27	83	Nate Moeller	Clubb Racing Inc.	Ford	1	0	Mechanical	17
Official race results

=== Race statistics ===
- Lead changes: 2 among 3 different drivers
- Cautions/Laps: 3 for 17 laps
- Red flags: 0
- Time of race: 1 hour, 15 minutes and 2 seconds
- Average speed: 119.947 miles per hour (193.036 km/h)

== Standings after the race ==
Drivers' Championship standings

	Pos	Driver	Points
	1	Jake Bollman	505
	2	Thomas Annunziata	489 (–16)
	3	Isabella Robusto	446 (–59)
	4	Jason Kitzmiller	436 (–69)
	5	Takuma Koga	409 (–96)
	6	Michael Maples	377 (–128)
1	7	Bobby Dale Earnhardt	358 (–147)
1	8	Alex Clubb	358 (–147)
	9	Ryan Vargas	315 (–190)
	10	Brad Smith	312 (–193)

- Note: Only the first 10 positions are included for the driver standings.

Previous race: 2026 Shore Lunch 250	ARCA Menards Series; 2026 season	Next race: 2026 Lime Rock Park ARCA 100
