= 2024 General Tire 150 (Dover) =

4th race of the 2024 ARCA Menards Series

Race details
- Race 4 of 20 of the 2024 ARCA Menards Series; Race 2 of 8 of the 2024 ARCA Menards Series East
- Date: April 26, 2024
- Official name: Inaugural General Tire 150
- Location: Dover Motor Speedway in Dover, Delaware
- Course: Permanent racing facility
- Course length: 1 miles (1.6 km)
- Distance: 150 laps, 150 mi (240 km)
- Scheduled distance: 150 laps, 150 mi (240 km)
- Average speed: 97.862 mph (157.494 km/h)

Pole position
Driver	William Sawalich	Joe Gibbs Racing
- Time: 22.248

Most laps led
Driver	William Sawalich	Joe Gibbs Racing
- Laps: 67

Winner
No. 28	Connor Zilisch	Pinnacle Racing Group

Television in the United States
- Network: FS2
- Announcers: Jamie Little, Phil Parsons, and Austin Cindric

Radio in the United States
- Radio: ARCA Racing Network

The 2024 General Tire 150 was the fourth stock car race of the 2024 ARCA Menards Series season, the second race of the 2024 ARCA Menards Series East season, and the inaugural running of the event. The race was held on Friday, April 26, 2024, at Dover Motor Speedway in Dover, Delaware, a 1-mile (1.6 km) permanent asphalt oval shaped speedway. The race took the scheduled 150 laps to complete. In an action-packed race, Connor Zilisch, driving for Pinnacle Racing Group, would survive the chaos that occurred with the leaders, and dominated the final stages of the race, leading the final 42 laps to earn his first career ARCA Menards Series win, his first career ARCA Menards Series East win, and his first career win in total. Pole-sitter William Sawalich and Gio Ruggiero dominated the majority of the race, with Sawalich leading a race-high 67 laps and Ruggiero leading 41 laps. Sawalich was involved in an incident with under 50 laps to go, and was unable to continue the race, finishing 17th. Ruggiero rebounded from a late-race penalty to finish in 2nd. To fill out the podium, Carson Kvapil, driving for Pinnacle Racing Group, would finish in 3rd, respectively.

== Report ==
=== Background ===
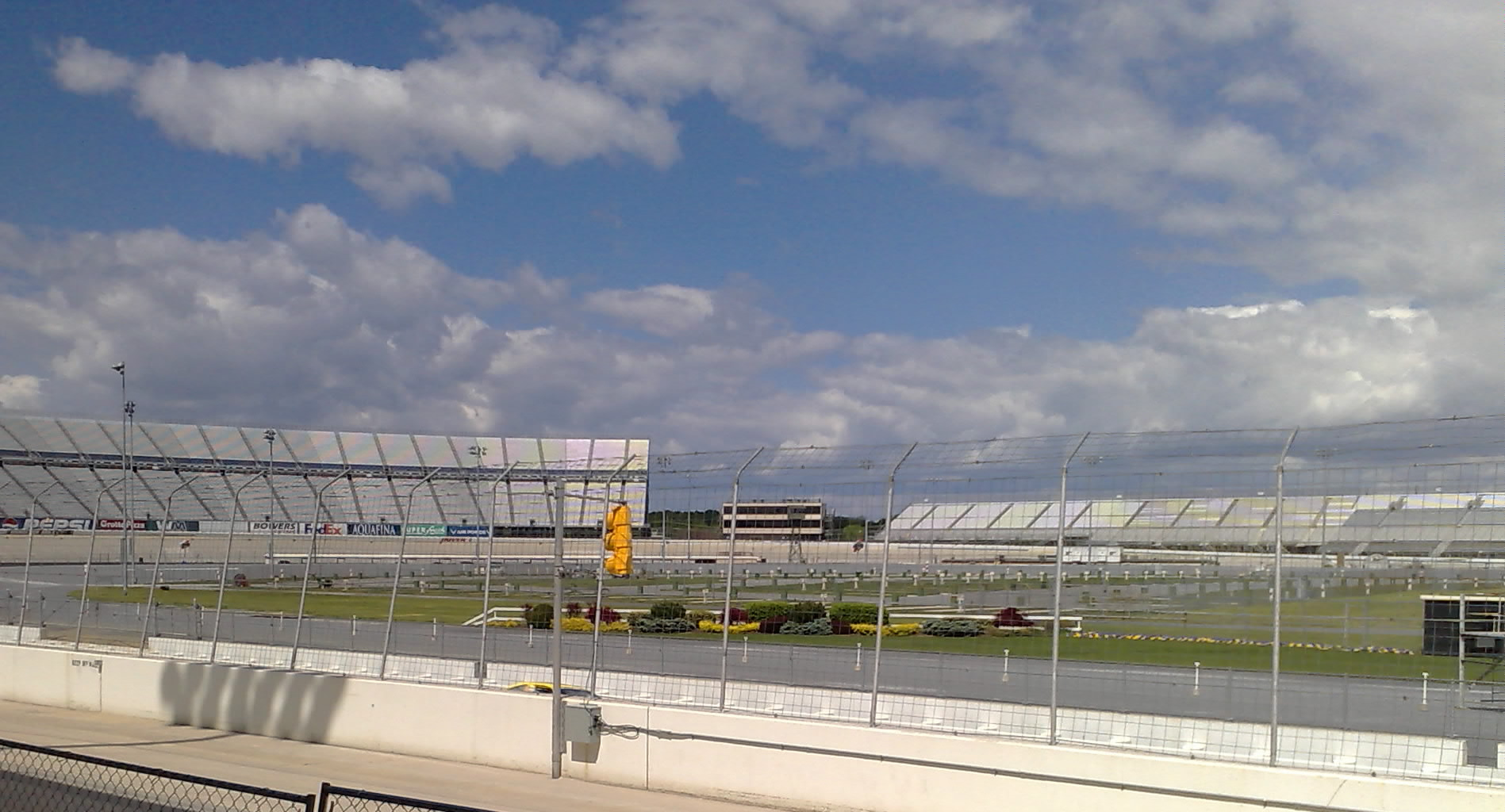
Dover Motor Speedway, the circuit where the race will be held.

Dover Motor Speedway is an oval race track in Dover, Delaware, United States that has held at least two NASCAR races since it opened in 1969. In addition to NASCAR, the track also hosted USAC and the NTT IndyCar Series. The track features one layout, a 1 mile (1.6 km) concrete oval, with 24° banking in the turns and 9° banking on the straights. The speedway is owned and operated by Speedway Motorsports.

The track, nicknamed "The Monster Mile", was built in 1969 by Melvin Joseph of Melvin L. Joseph Construction Company, Inc., with an asphalt surface, but was replaced with concrete in 1995. Six years later in 2001, the track's capacity moved to 135,000 seats, making the track have the largest capacity of sports venue in the mid-Atlantic. In 2002, the name changed to Dover International Speedway from Dover Downs International Speedway after Dover Downs Gaming and Entertainment split, making Dover Motorsports. From 2007 to 2009, the speedway worked on an improvement project called "The Monster Makeover", which expanded facilities at the track and beautified the track. After the 2014 season, the track's capacity was reduced to 95,500 seats.

==== Entry list ====
- (R) denotes rookie driver.

#	Driver	Team	Make	Sponsor
2	Andrés Pérez de Lara	Rev Racing	Chevrolet	Max Siegel Inc.
03	Alex Clubb	Clubb Racing Inc.	Ford	Race Parts Liquidators
06	Cody Dennison (R)	Wayne Peterson Racing	Toyota	ALL CAPS Comics
6	Lavar Scott (R)	Rev Racing	Chevrolet	Max Siegel Inc.
10	Ed Pompa	Fast Track Racing	Ford	Infinity Aggregates LLC / Double "H" Ranch
11	Zachary Tinkle	Fast Track Racing	Toyota	Racing for Rescues
12	Mike Basham	Fast Track Racing	Toyota	NASCAR Technical Institute
15	Kris Wright	Venturini Motorsports	Toyota	FNB Corporation
17	Marco Andretti	Cook Racing Technologies	Chevrolet	Group 1001 / MMI
18	William Sawalich	Joe Gibbs Racing	Toyota	Starkey / SoundGear
20	Gio Ruggiero (R)	Venturini Motorsports	Toyota	JBL
22	Amber Balcaen	Venturini Motorsports	Toyota	ICON Direct
25	Toni Breidinger	Venturini Motorsports	Toyota	Raising Cane's Chicken Fingers
28	Connor Zilisch (R)	Pinnacle Racing Group	Chevrolet	Chevrolet / Silver Hare Development
31	Rita Goulet	Rise Motorsports	Chevrolet	National Police / Max Buchanan Foundation
32	Christian Rose	AM Racing	Ford	West Virginia Department of Tourism
35	Greg Van Alst	Greg Van Alst Motorsports	Ford	Holzerman General Contracting
39	D. L. Wilson	Costner Weaver Motorsports	Toyota	Heart O' Texas Speedway / ETR
42	Tanner Reif	Cook Racing Technologies	Toyota	Vegas Fastener Manufacturing / MMI
55	Brent Crews	Venturini Motorsports	Toyota	Mobil 1
73	Andy Jankowiak	KLAS Motorsports	Toyota	Galactic Acres
82	Carson Kvapil	Pinnacle Racing Group	Chevrolet	Chevrolet Performance
93	Caleb Costner (R)	Costner Weaver Motorsports	Chevrolet	Strapinno
99	Michael Maples (R)	Fast Track Racing	Chevrolet	Don Ray Petroleum LLC
Official entry list

== Practice ==
The first and only practice session was held on Friday, April 26, at 12:40 PM EST, and would last for 45 minutes. William Sawalich, driving for Joe Gibbs Racing, would set the fastest time in the session, with a lap of 22.411, and a speed of 160.635 mph (258.517 km/h).

Pos.	#	Driver	Team	Make	Time	Speed
1	18	William Sawalich	Joe Gibbs Racing	Toyota	22.411	160.635
2	55	Brent Crews	Venturini Motorsports	Toyota	22.508	159.943
3	20	Gio Ruggiero (R)	Venturini Motorsports	Toyota	22.619	159.158
Full practice results

== Qualifying ==
Qualifying was held on Friday, April 26, at 1:40 PM EST. The qualifying system used is a multi-car, multi-lap based system. All drivers will be on track for a 20-minute timed session, and whoever sets the fastest time in that session will win the pole.

William Sawalich, driving for Joe Gibbs Racing, would score the pole for the race, with a lap of 22.248, and a speed of 161.812 mph (260.411 km/h).

Two drivers withdrew from the race: Brad Smith and Dale Shearer.

=== Qualifying results ===
Pos.	#	Driver	Team	Make	Time	Speed
1	18	William Sawalich	Joe Gibbs Racing	Toyota	22.248	161.812
2	55	Brent Crews	Venturini Motorsports	Toyota	22.445	160.392
3	20	Gio Ruggiero (R)	Venturini Motorsports	Toyota	22.516	159.886
4	82	Carson Kvapil	Pinnacle Racing Group	Chevrolet	22.599	159.299
5	6	Lavar Scott (R)	Rev Racing	Chevrolet	22.620	159.151
6	28	Connor Zilisch (R)	Pinnacle Racing Group	Chevrolet	22.674	158.772
7	2	Andrés Pérez de Lara	Rev Racing	Chevrolet	22.757	158.193
8	15	Kris Wright	Venturini Motorsports	Toyota	22.841	157.611
9	25	Toni Breidinger	Venturini Motorsports	Toyota	23.109	155.783
10	17	Marco Andretti	Cook Racing Technologies	Chevrolet	23.203	155.152
11	73	Andy Jankowiak	KLAS Motorsports	Toyota	23.329	154.314
12	32	Christian Rose	AM Racing	Ford	23.341	154.235
13	22	Amber Balcaen	Venturini Motorsports	Toyota	23.402	153.833
14	42	Tanner Reif	Cook Racing Technologies	Toyota	23.592	152.594
15	35	Greg Van Alst	Greg Van Alst Motorsports	Ford	24.125	149.223
16	39	D. L. Wilson	Costner Weaver Motorsports	Toyota	24.596	146.365
17	06	Cody Dennison (R)	Wayne Peterson Racing	Toyota	24.635	146.134
18	93	Caleb Costner (R)	Costner Weaver Motorsports	Chevrolet	25.022	143.873
19	10	Ed Pompa	Fast Track Racing	Ford	25.170	143.027
20	11	Zachary Tinkle	Fast Track Racing	Toyota	25.351	142.006
21	99	Michael Maples (R)	Fast Track Racing	Chevrolet	26.072	138.079
22	03	Alex Clubb	Clubb Racing Inc.	Ford	27.120	132.743
23	12	Mike Basham	Fast Track Racing	Toyota	27.691	130.006
24	31	Rita Goulet	Rise Motorsports	Chevrolet	–	–
Withdrew
	48	Brad Smith	Brad Smith Motorsports	Ford		
	98	Dale Shearer	Shearer Speed Racing	Toyota		
Official qualifying results

== Race results ==
Fin	St	#	Driver	Team	Make	Laps	Led	Status	Pts
1	6	28	Connor Zilisch (R)	Pinnacle Racing Group	Chevrolet	150	42	Running	47
2	3	20	Gio Ruggiero (R)	Venturini Motorsports	Toyota	150	41	Running	43
3	4	82	Carson Kvapil	Pinnacle Racing Group	Chevrolet	150	0	Running	41
4	5	6	Lavar Scott (R)	Rev Racing	Chevrolet	150	0	Running	40
5	7	2	Andrés Pérez de Lara	Rev Racing	Chevrolet	150	0	Running	39
6	8	15	Kris Wright	Venturini Motorsports	Toyota	150	0	Running	38
7	11	73	Andy Jankowiak	KLAS Motorsports	Toyota	150	0	Running	37
8	15	35	Greg Van Alst	Greg Van Alst Motorsports	Ford	150	0	Running	36
9	18	93	Caleb Costner (R)	Costner Weaver Motorsports	Chevrolet	147	0	Running	35
10	20	11	Zachary Tinkle	Fast Track Racing	Toyota	144	0	Running	34
11	16	39	D. L. Wilson	Costner Weaver Motorsports	Toyota	144	0	Running	33
12	17	06	Cody Dennison (R)	Wayne Peterson Racing	Toyota	142	0	Running	32
13	19	10	Ed Pompa	Fast Track Racing	Ford	141	0	Accident	31
14	21	99	Michael Maples (R)	Fast Track Racing	Chevrolet	140	0	Running	30
15	9	25	Toni Breidinger	Venturini Motorsports	Toyota	137	0	Accident	29
16	2	55	Brent Crews	Venturini Motorsports	Toyota	117	0	Running	28
17	1	18	William Sawalich	Joe Gibbs Racing	Toyota	108	67	Accident	30
18	22	03	Alex Clubb	Clubb Racing Inc.	Ford	96	0	DNF	26
19	10	17	Marco Andretti	Cook Racing Technologies	Chevrolet	89	0	Loss Power	25
20	13	22	Amber Balcaen	Venturini Motorsports	Toyota	74	0	Accident	24
21	12	32	Christian Rose	AM Racing	Ford	74	0	Accident	23
22	14	42	Tanner Reif	Cook Racing Technologies	Toyota	65	0	DNF	22
23	24	31	Rita Goulet	Rise Motorsports	Chevrolet	35	0	Accident	21
24	23	12	Mike Basham	Fast Track Racing	Toyota	4	0	Handling	20
Withdrew
		48	Brad Smith	Brad Smith Motorsports	Ford				
		98	Dale Shearer	Shearer Speed Racing	Toyota				
Official race results

== Standings after the race ==
Drivers' Championship standings (ARCA Main)

	Pos	Driver	Points
2	1	Andrés Pérez de Lara	143
	2	Greg Van Alst	142 (-1)
2	3	Christian Rose	130 (–13)
	4	Amber Balcaen	125 (–18)
2	5	Kris Wright	118 (–25)
3	6	Lavar Scott	116 (–27)
5	7	Andy Jankowiak	105 (–38)
	8	Toni Breidinger	105 (–38)
2	9	Alex Clubb	95 (–48)
7	10	Caleb Costner	94 (–49)

Drivers' Championship standings (ARCA East)

	Pos	Driver	Points
	1	Gio Ruggiero	90
2	2	Connor Zilisch	88 (-2)
1	3	William Sawalich	75 (–15)
4	4	Zachary Tinkle	70 (–20)
4	5	D. L. Wilson	68 (–22)
4	6	Cody Dennison	66 (–24)
5	7	Michael Maples	62 (–28)
2	8	Mike Basham	58 (–32)
5	9	Rita Goulet	52 (–38)
7	10	Bubba Pollard	41 (–49)

- Note: Only the first 10 positions are included for the driver standings.

Previous race: 2024 General Tire 200	ARCA Menards Series; 2024 season	Next race: 2024 Tide 150

Previous race: 2024 Pensacola 150	ARCA Menards Series East; 2024 season	Next race: 2024 Music City 150
