= 2026 Shore Lunch 250 =

ARCA Menards Series race at Elko Speedway

2026 Shore Lunch 250 presented by Dutch Boy
Race details
- Race 10 of 20 in the 2026 ARCA Menards Series
- Date: June 27, 2026
- Location: Elko Speedway in Elko New Market, Minnesota
- Course: Permanent racing facility
- Course length: 0.375 miles (0.604 km)
- Distance: 250 laps, 93.750 mi (150.876 km)
- Average speed: 65.995 miles per hour (106.209 km/h)

Pole position
Driver	Thomas Annunziata	Nitro Motorsports
- Time: 14.603

Most laps led
Driver	Landon S. Huffman	Pinnacle Racing Group
- Laps: 130

Fastest lap
Driver	Max Reaves	Joe Gibbs Racing
- Time: 14.793

Winner
No. 18	Max Reaves	Joe Gibbs Racing

Television in the United States
- Network: FS2
- Announcers: Eric Brennan and Phil Parsons

Radio in the United States
- Radio: ARN

The 2026 Shore Lunch 250 presented by Dutch Boy was an ARCA Menards Series race held on Saturday, June 27, 2026, at Elko Speedway in Elko New Market, Minnesota. Contested over 250 laps on the 0.375-mile (0.604 km) short track, it was the tenth race of the 2026 ARCA Menards Series season, and the 11th running of the event.

After late mechanical issues plagued Landon S. Huffman, Max Reaves, driving for Joe Gibbs Racing, led the final 98 laps of the race after starting from the rear to earn his fifth career ARCA Menards Series win, and his second of the season. Huffman dominated the early stages of the race, leading a race-high 130 laps after starting second before experiencing a mechanical issue along with a five-lap penalty. He would end up finishing 14th, 14 laps down. Jake Bollman finished second, and Ty Fredrickson finished third. Taylor Reimer and Jason Kitzmiller rounded out the top five, while Isabella Robusto, Thomas Annunziata, Willie Mullins, Takuma Koga, and Austin Vaughn rounded out the top ten.

== Report ==
=== Background ===
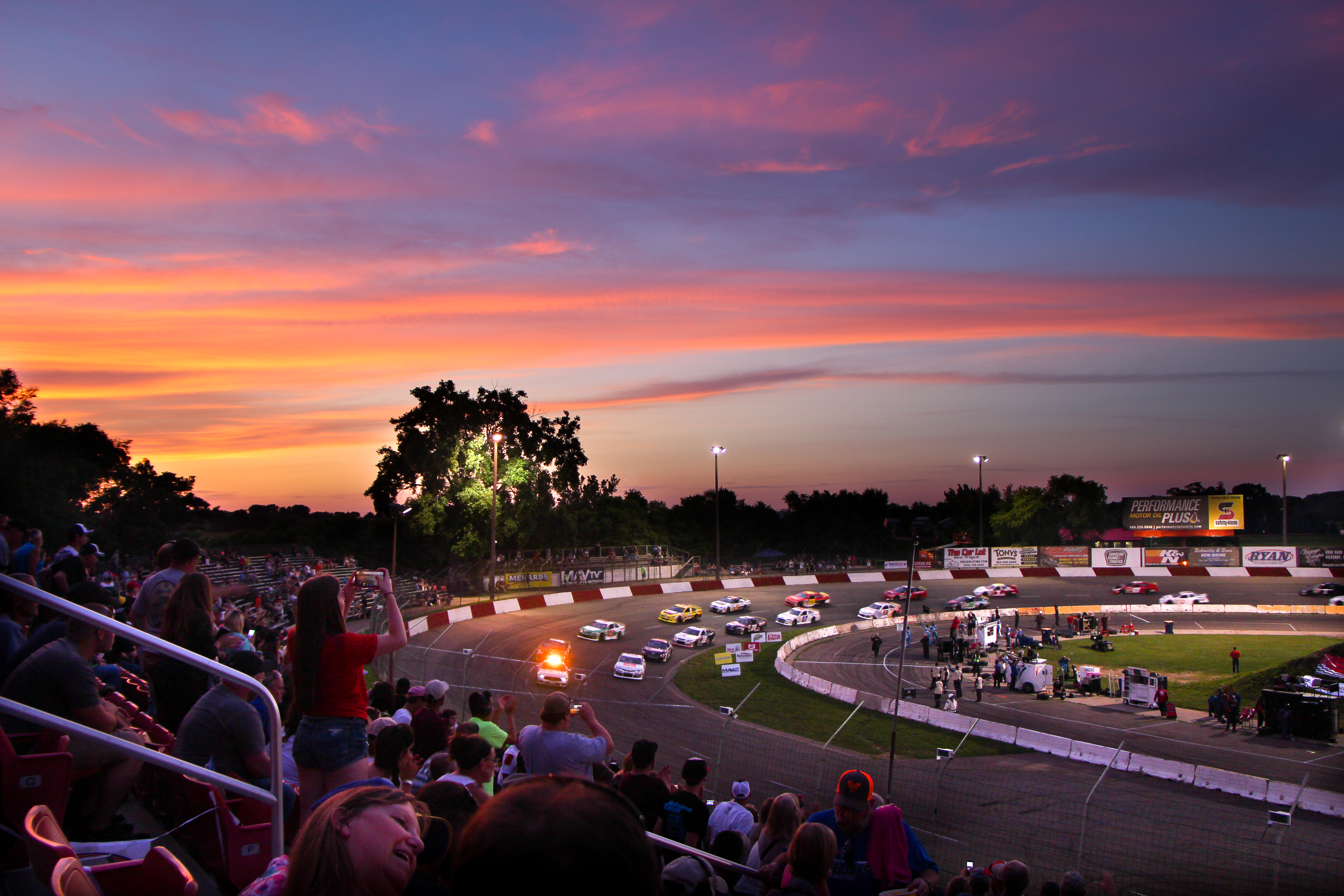
Elko Speedway, the track where the race was held.

Elko Speedway is a 3/8 mile asphalt oval NASCAR-sanctioned race track located in Elko New Market, Minnesota. Elko Speedway is a track in the NASCAR Advance Auto Parts Weekly Series. The track is located in the former Elko portion of the merged city that happened nearly 20 years before.

The ARCA racing series held the Akona 200, their first ever race in Minnesota, at Elko Speedway on June 2, 2012. The series returned in 2013 and 2014 for the Akona 250, by adding 50 more laps to the event. Elko is currently the shortest track that ARCA currently races on.

==== Entry list ====
- (R) denotes rookie driver.

#	Driver	Team	Make
03	Alex Clubb	Clubb Racing Inc.	Ford
3	Willie Mullins	Mullins Racing	Ford
06	Nate Moeller	Wayne Peterson Motorsports	Toyota
10	John Clagett	Fast Track Racing	Toyota
11	Bryce Haugeberg	Fast Track Racing	Ford
12	Takuma Koga	Fast Track Racing	Toyota
18	Max Reaves (R)	Joe Gibbs Racing	Toyota
20	Jake Bollman (R)	Nitro Motorsports	Toyota
25	Ty Fredrickson	Nitro Motorsports	Toyota
28	Landon S. Huffman	Pinnacle Racing Group	Chevrolet
48	Brad Smith	Brad Smith Motorsports	Ford
55	Isabella Robusto	Nitro Motorsports	Toyota
70	Thomas Annunziata	Nitro Motorsports	Toyota
77	Taylor Reimer	Pinnacle Racing Group	Chevrolet
81	Kevin Campbell	KC Motorsports	Chevrolet
86	Jeff Maconi (R)	Clubb Racing Inc.	Ford
89	Bobby Dale Earnhardt	Rise Racing	Chevrolet
91	Austin Vaughn	Maples Motorsports	Ford
97	Jason Kitzmiller	CR7 Motorsports	Chevrolet
98	Dale Shearer	Shearer Speed Racing	Toyota
99	Michael Maples	Maples Motorsports	Chevrolet
Official entry list

== Practice ==
The first and only practice session was held on Saturday, June 27, at 3:40 PM CST, and it lasted for 50 minutes.

Jason Kitzmiller, who was driving for CR7 Motorsports, set the fastest time in the session, with a lap of 14.766 seconds, and with a speed of 91.426 miles per hour (147.136 km/h).

=== Practice results ===
Pos.	#	Driver	Team	Make	Time	Speed
1	97	Jason Kitzmiller	CR7 Motorsports	Chevrolet	14.766	91.426
2	18	Max Reaves (R)	Joe Gibbs Racing	Toyota	14.838	90.983
3	77	Taylor Reimer	Pinnacle Racing Group	Chevrolet	14.894	90.641
Full practice results

== Qualifying ==
The qualifying session was held on Saturday, June 27, at 5:20 PM CST. The qualifying procedure used was by having a single-car, two-lap based system. The drivers were on track by themselves and had two laps to post a qualifying time, and whoever set the fastest time would win the pole.

Thomas Annunziata, driving for Nitro Motorsports, qualified on pole position with a lap of 14.603 seconds, and a speed of 92.447 miles per hour (148.779 km/h).

=== Qualifying results ===
Pos.	#	Driver	Team	Make	Time	Speed
1	70	Thomas Annunziata	Nitro Motorsports	Toyota	14.603	92.447
2	28	Landon S. Huffman	Pinnacle Racing Group	Chevrolet	14.608	92.415
3	20	Jake Bollman (R)	Nitro Motorsports	Toyota	14.702	91.824
4	55	Isabella Robusto	Nitro Motorsports	Toyota	14.761	91.457
5	25	Ty Fredrickson	Nitro Motorsports	Toyota	14.774	91.377
6	77	Taylor Reimer	Pinnacle Racing Group	Chevrolet	14.833	91.013
7	3	Willie Mullins	Mullins Racing	Ford	14.872	90.775
8	97	Jason Kitzmiller	CR7 Motorsports	Chevrolet	14.961	90.235
9	12	Takuma Koga	Fast Track Racing	Toyota	15.067	89.600
10	99	Michael Maples	Maples Motorsports	Chevrolet	15.388	87.731
11	91	Austin Vaughn	Maples Motorsports	Ford	15.389	87.725
12	89	Bobby Dale Earnhardt	Rise Racing	Chevrolet	15.411	87.600
13	03	Alex Clubb	Clubb Racing Inc.	Ford	15.538	86.884
14	11	Bryce Haugeberg	Fast Track Racing	Ford	15.728	85.834
15	86	Jeff Maconi (R)	Clubb Racing Inc.	Ford	16.205	83.308
16	48	Brad Smith	Brad Smith Motorsports	Ford	16.364	82.498
17	06	Nate Moeller	Wayne Peterson Motorsports	Toyota	16.506	81.788
18	10	John Clagett	Fast Track Racing	Toyota	16.802	80.348
19	98	Dale Shearer	Shearer Speed Racing	Toyota	16.934	79.721
20	18	Max Reaves (R)	Joe Gibbs Racing	Toyota	—	—
21	81	Kevin Campbell	KC Motorsports	Chevrolet	—	—
Official qualifying results

== Race ==
=== Race results ===
Laps: 250

Fin	St	#	Driver	Team	Make	Laps	Led	Status	Pts
1	20	18	Max Reaves (R)	Joe Gibbs Racing	Toyota	250	113	Running	47
2	3	20	Jake Bollman (R)	Nitro Motorsports	Toyota	250	0	Running	92
3	5	25	Ty Fredrickson	Nitro Motorsports	Toyota	250	0	Running	41
4	6	77	Taylor Reimer	Pinnacle Racing Group	Chevrolet	250	0	Running	40
5	8	97	Jason Kitzmiller	CR7 Motorsports	Chevrolet	250	0	Running	89
6	4	55	Isabella Robusto	Nitro Motorsports	Toyota	250	0	Running	88
7	1	70	Thomas Annunziata	Nitro Motorsports	Toyota	249	7	Running	89
8	7	3	Willie Mullins	Mullins Racing	Ford	247	0	Running	36
9	9	12	Takuma Koga	Fast Track Racing	Toyota	245	0	Running	85
10	11	91	Austin Vaughn	Maples Motorsports	Ford	242	0	Running	34
11	12	89	Bobby Dale Earnhardt	Rise Racing	Chevrolet	239	0	Running	83
12	14	11	Bryce Haugeberg	Fast Track Racing	Ford	239	0	Running	32
13	13	03	Alex Clubb	Clubb Racing Inc.	Ford	237	0	Running	81
14	2	28	Landon S. Huffman	Pinnacle Racing Group	Chevrolet	236	130	Running	32
15	15	86	Jeff Maconi (R)	Clubb Racing Inc.	Ford	232	0	Running	79
16	16	48	Brad Smith	Brad Smith Motorsports	Ford	232	0	Running	78
17	17	06	Nate Moeller	Wayne Peterson Motorsports	Toyota	225	0	Running	27
18	19	98	Dale Shearer	Shearer Speed Racing	Toyota	223	0	Running	26
19	10	99	Michael Maples	Maples Motorsports	Chevrolet	72	0	Accident	75
20	18	10	John Clagett	Fast Track Racing	Toyota	4	0	Mechanical	24
21	21	81	Kevin Campbell	KC Motorsports	Chevrolet	0	0	Did Not Start	23
Official race results

=== Race statistics ===
- Lead changes: 4 among 3 different drivers
- Cautions/Laps: 5 for 40 laps
- Red flags: 0
- Time of race: 1 hour, 25 minutes and 1 second
- Average speed: 65.995 miles per hour (106.209 km/h)

== Standings after the race ==
Drivers' Championship standings

	Pos	Driver	Points
	1	Jake Bollman	469
	2	Thomas Annunziata	448 (–21)
	3	Isabella Robusto	415 (–54)
1	4	Jason Kitzmiller	401 (–68)
1	5	Takuma Koga	381 (–88)
1	6	Michael Maples	354 (–115)
2	7	Alex Clubb	336 (–133)
2	8	Bobby Dale Earnhardt	333 (–136)
5	9	Ryan Vargas	315 (–154)
2	10	Brad Smith	293 (–176)

- Note: Only the first 10 positions are included for the driver standings.

Previous race: 2026 Herr's Snacks 200	ARCA Menards Series; 2026 season	Next race: 2026 Ashley Furniture 150
