= 2024 NAPA Auto Care 150 =

8th race of the 2024 ARCA Menards Series West

Race details
- Race 8 of 12 in the 2024 ARCA Menards Series West season
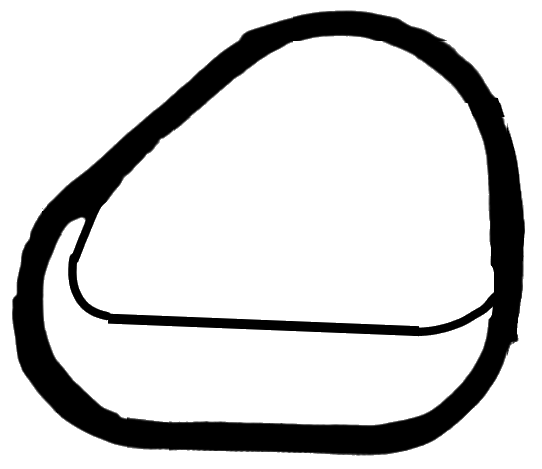
- Date: August 10, 2024
- Location: Tri-City Raceway in West Richland, Washington
- Course: Permanent racing facility
- Course length: 0.50 miles (0.80 km)
- Scheduled distance: 150 laps, 56 mi (120 km)
- Average speed: 63.664 mph (102.457 km/h)

Pole position
Driver	Sean Hingorani	Jerry Pitts Racing
- Time: 18.675

Most laps led
Driver	Sean Hingorani	Jerry Pitts Racing
- Laps: 109

Winner
No. 13	Tyler Reif	Central Coast Racing

Television in the United States
- Network: FloRacing
- Announcers: Charles Krall

Radio in the United States
- Radio: ARCA Racing Network

The 2024 NAPA Auto Care 150 was the 8th stock car race of the 2024 ARCA Menards Series West season, and the 1st iteration of the event. The race was held on Saturday, August 10, 2024, at Tri-City Raceway in West Richland, Washington, a 1/2 mile permanent paved oval shaped short track. The race took the scheduled 150 laps to complete.

== Report ==
=== Background ===
The West Series first visited Tri-City in 1968, when Ray Elder drove his 1967 Dodge to victory. The West Series visited Tri-City infrequently in the years that followed, with competitors like Jim Cook, Jack McCoy, Roy Smith, Dirk Stephens, Mike Chase and Jason Jefferson securing victories at the half-mile tri-oval.

=== Entry list ===
- (R) denotes rookie driver.

#	Driver	Team	Make	Sponsor
3	Todd Souza	Central Coast Racing	Toyota	Central Coast Cabinets
05	David Smith	Shockwave Motorsports	Toyota	Shockwave Marine Suspension Seating
5	Sean Hingorani	Jerry Pitts Racing	Toyota	Fidelity Capital
6	Jess Havens	Jerry Pitts Racing	Toyota	Western Rail
7	Takuma Koga	Jerry Pitts Racing	Toyota	Lobster-Koshi NoKangai CKB-Jerry Pitts Racing
11	Danica Dart (R)	Kennealy Keller Motorsports	TBA	EBCO Construction-Evers Farms-Guardian Fence
12	Kyle Keller	Kennealy Keller Motorsports	Ford	Setting The Stage / Battle Born
13	Tyler Reif	Central Coast Racing	Toyota	Central Coast Cabinets
16	Jack Wood	Bill McAnally Racing	Chevrolet	NAPA Auto Care
19	Eric Johnson Jr. (R)	Bill McAnally Racing	Chevrolet	Pacific Office Automation
23	Greg Biffle	Sigma Performance Services	Chevrolet	SPS-GMS-Greg Biffle
31	Rick Redig-Tackman	Rise Motorsports	Chevrolet	Max Buchanan Foundation
50	Trevor Huddleston	High Point Racing	Ford	High Point Racing / Racecar Factory
71	Nick Joanides	Jan's Towing Racing	Ford	Jan's Towing
88	Kasey Kleyn	Naake Klauer Motorsports	Ford	Shockwave Marine Suspension Seating
Official entry list

== Practice ==
The first and only practice session was held on Saturday, August 10, at 2:45 PM PST, and would last for 1 hour. Sean Hingorani, driving for Jerry Pitts Racing, would set the fastest time in the session, with a lap of 19.144, and a speed of 94.024 mph (151.317 km/h).

=== Practice results ===
Pos.	#	Driver	Team	Make	Time	Speed
1	5	Sean Hingorani	Jerry Pitts Racing	Toyota	19.144	94.024
2	13	Tyler Reif	Central Coast Racing	Toyota	19.205	93.726
3	3	Todd Souza	Central Coast Racing	Toyota	19.228	93.613
Full practice results

== Qualifying ==
Qualifying was held on Saturday, August 10, at 4:45 PM PST. The qualifying system used is a single-car, two-lap system with only one round. Drivers will be on track by themselves and will have two laps to post a qualifying time, and whoever sets the fastest time in that round will win the pole.

Sean Hingorani, driving for Jerry Pitts Racing, would score the pole for the race, with a lap of 18.675, and a speed of 96.386 mph (155.118 km/h).

=== Qualifying results ===
Pos.	#	Driver	Team	Make	Time	Speed
1	5	Sean Hingorani	Jerry Pitts Racing	Toyota	18.675	96.386
2	13	Tyler Reif	Central Coast Racing	Toyota	18.795	95.77
3	16	Jack Wood	Bill McAnally Racing	Chevrolet	18.998	94.747
4	23	Greg Biffle	Sigma Performance Services	Chevrolet	19.029	94.592
5	12	Kyle Keller	Kennealy Keller Motorsports	Ford	19.147	94.01
6	6	Jess Havens	Brain Wies	Toyota	19.164	93.926
7	7	Takuma Koga	Jerry Pitts Racing	Toyota	19.208	93.711
8	88	Kasey Kleyn	Naake Klauer Motorsports	Ford	19.216	93.672
9	19	Eric Johnson Jr. (R)	Bill McAnally Racing	Chevrolet	19.253	93.492
10	3	Todd Souza	Central Coast Racing	Toyota	19.262	93.448
11	50	Trevor Huddleston	High Point Racing	Ford	19.32	93.168
12	71	Nick Joanides	Jan's Towing Racing	Ford	19.402	92.774
13	11	Danica Dart (R)	Kennealy Keller Motorsports	Ford	19.49	92.355
14	31	Rick Redig-Tackman	Rise Motorsports	Chevrolet	19.716	91.296
15	05	David Smith	Shockwave Motorsports	Toyota	20.842	86.364
Official qualifying results

== Race results ==
Fin	St	#	Driver	Team	Make	Laps	Led	Status	Pts
1	2	13	Tyler Reif	Central Coast Racing	Toyota	150	41	Running	47
2	1	5	Sean Hingorani	Jerry Pitts Racing	Toyota	150	109	Running	44
3	3	16	Jack Wood	Bill McAnally Racing	Chevrolet	150	0	Running	41
4	10	3	Todd Souza	Central Coast Racing	Toyota	150	0	Running	40
5	5	12	Kyle Keller	Kennealy Keller Motorsports	Ford	150	0	Running	39
6	11	50	Trevor Huddleston	High Point Racing	Ford	150	0	Running	38
7	8	88	Kasey Kleyn	Naake Klauer Motorsports	Ford	150	0	Running	37
8	6	6	Jess Havens	Brain Wies	Toyota	150	0	Running	36
9	4	23	Greg Biffle	Sigma Performance Services	Chevrolet	150	0	Running	35
10	12	71	Nick Joanides	Jan's Towing Racing	Ford	148	0	Running	34
11	7	7	Takuma Koga	Jerry Pitts Racing	Toyota	148	0	Running	33
12	14	31	Rick Redig-Tackman	Rise Motorsports	Chevrolet	148	0	Running	32
13	9	19	Eric Johnson Jr. (R)	Bill McAnally Racing	Chevrolet	148	0	Running	31
14	13	11	Danica Dart (R)	Kennealy Keller Motorsports	Ford	148	0	Running	30
15	15	05	David Smith	Shockwave Motorsports	Toyota	134	0	Running	29
Official race results

== Standings after the race ==
Drivers' Championship standings

Pos	Driver	Points
1	Tyler Reif	387
2	Sean Hingorani	380 (-7)
3	Jack Wood	343 (–44)
4	Trevor Huddleston	336 (–51)
5	Kyle Keller	331 (–56)
6	Nick Joanides	310 (–77)
7	Eric Johnson Jr.	300 (–88)
8	Takuma Koga	299 (–89)
9	Todd Souza	295 (–92)
10	David Smith	262 (–125)

- Note: Only the first 10 positions are included for the driver standings.

Previous race: 2024 Shasta 150	ARCA Menards Series West; 2024 season	Next race: 2024 West Coast Stock Car Motorsports Hall of Fame 150 (Madera)
