= 2024 General Tire 200 (Sonoma) =

4th race of the 2024 ARCA Menards Series West

Race details
- Race 4 of 12 of the 2024 ARCA Menards Series West
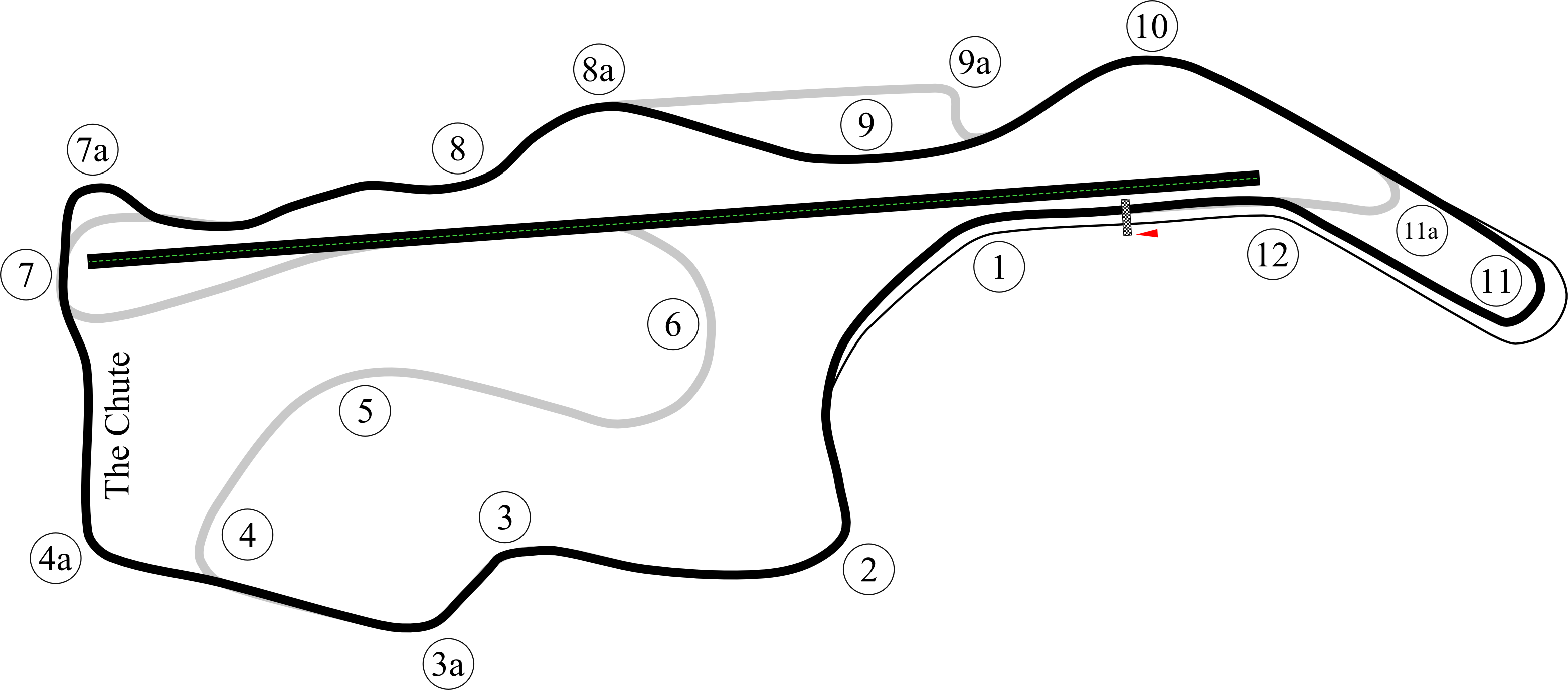
- Date: June 7, 2024
- Official name: 18th Annual General Tire 200
- Location: Sonoma Raceway in Sonoma, California
- Course: Permanent racing facility
- Course length: 1.99 miles (3.20 km)
- Distance: 67 laps, 133 mi (214 km)
- Scheduled distance: 64 laps, 127 mi (205 km)
- Average speed: 68.016 mph (109.461 km/h)

Pole position
Driver	Sam Mayer	Sigma Performance Services
- Time: 1:17.138

Most laps led
Driver	Sam Mayer	Sigma Performance Services
- Laps: 37

Winner
No. 23	Sam Mayer	Sigma Performance Services

Television in the United States
- Network: FloRacing
- Announcers: Charles Krall

Radio in the United States
- Radio: ARCA Racing Network

The 2024 General Tire 200 was the 4th stock car race of the 2024 ARCA Menards Series West season, and the 18th running of the event. The race was held on Friday, June 7, 2024, at Sonoma Raceway in Sonoma, California, a 1.99 mile (3.20 km) permanent asphalt road course. The race was originally scheduled to be contested over 64 laps, but was increased to 67 laps, due to a NASCAR overtime finish. Sam Mayer, driving for Sigma Performance Services, would take the lead from William Sawalich in the middle stages of the race, and led the final 37 laps to earn his second career ARCA Menards Series West win, and his first of the season. Sawalich led 21 laps, but fell back after an early race incident. He rebounded to finish in 4th. To fill out the podium, Tyler Reif, driving for Central Coast Racing, and Sean Hingorani, driving for Jerry Pitts Racing, would finish 2nd and 3rd, respectively.

== Report ==
=== Background ===
Layout of Sonoma Raceway, the circuit where the race was held.

Sonoma Raceway is a 1.99-mile (3.20 km) road course and drag strip located on the landform known as Sears Point in the southern Sonoma Mountains in Sonoma, California, U.S. The road course features 12 turns on a hilly course with 160 feet (49 m) of total elevation change. It is host to one of only seven NASCAR Cup Series races each year that are run on road courses. It is also host to the NTT IndyCar Series and several other auto races and motorcycle races such as the American Federation of Motorcyclists series. Sonoma Raceway continues to host amateur, or club racing events which may or may not be open to the general public. The largest such car club is the Sports Car Club of America. In 2022, the race was reverted to racing the club configuration.

==== Entry list ====
- (R) denotes rookie driver.

#	Driver	Team	Make	Sponsor
0	Tony Huffman	Fierce Creature Racing	Chevrolet	LT&T Lawn Service / Camping World
1	Robbie Kennealy (R)	Kennealy Keller Motorsports	Chevrolet	Setting The Stage / Wiley X
3	Todd Souza	Central Coast Racing	Toyota	Central Coast Cabinets
4	Eric Nascimento	Nascimento Motorsports	Toyota	Impact Transportation / RJ's Paintshop
05	David Smith	Shockwave Motorsports	Toyota	Shockwave Marine Suspension Seating
5	Sean Hingorani	Jerry Pitts Racing	Toyota	Fidelity Capital
6	Caleb Shrader	Jerry Pitts Racing	Ford	Consonus Healthcare
7	Takuma Koga	Jerry Pitts Racing	Toyota	Macnica
12	Kyle Keller	Kennealy Keller Motorsports	Chevrolet	Setting The Stage / Battle Born
13	Tyler Reif	Central Coast Racing	Ford	Central Coast Cabinets
15	Brent Crews	Venturini Motorsports	Toyota	Mobil 1
16	Jack Wood	Bill McAnally Racing	Chevrolet	NAPA Auto Care
17	Marco Andretti	Cook Racing Technologies	Chevrolet	Group 1001
18	William Sawalich	Joe Gibbs Racing	Toyota	Starkey / SoundGear
19	Eric Johnson Jr. (R)	Bill McAnally Racing	Chevrolet	Pacific Office Automation
20	Gio Ruggiero	Venturini Motorsports	Toyota	First Auto Group
21	Travis McCullough	Nascimento Motorsports	Toyota	California Pneumatic Pumps
23	Sam Mayer	Sigma Performance Services	Chevrolet	SPS / GMS Fabrication
27	Bobby Hillis Jr.	Fierce Creature Racing	Chevrolet	First Impression Press / LT&T Lawn Service
30	Noah Gragson	Rette Jones Racing	Ford	Rette Jones Racing
32	Dale Quarterley	1/4 Ley Racing	Chevrolet	Van Dyk Recycling Solutions / Motul
41	Johnny Borneman III	Lowden Jackson Motorsports	Ford	Travel Nevada / Stoney's
42	Brandon Jones	Cook Racing Technologies	Chevrolet	Delta Faucet Company
50	Trevor Huddleston	High Point Racing	Ford	High Point Racing / Racecar Factory
52	Ryan Philpott	Philpott Race Cars	Toyota	Mattos Equipment Rentals / Hacienda Pools
55	Isabella Robusto	Venturini Motorsports	Toyota	Yahoo!
68	Rodd Kneeland	Rodd Racing	Chevrolet	Florian Industries / Rodd Renovations
71	Nick Joanides	Jan's Towing Racing	Ford	Jan's Towing
77	Dave Smith	Performance P–1 Motorsports	Toyota	Global Office Inc. / King Taco
80	Brian Kamisky	Derek Copeland Racing	Chevrolet	SK Construction / Wards Concrete
86	Tim Spurgeon	Spurgeon Motorsports	Chevrolet	Kleen Blast / Davids Racing Products
Official entry list

== Practice ==
The first and only practice session was held on Friday, June 7, at 10:40 a.m. PST, and would last for 1 hour and 20 minutes. Sam Mayer, driving for, Sigma Performance Services, would set the fastest time in the session, with a lap of 1:17.200, and a speed of 92.858 mph (149.440 km/h).

Pos.	#	Driver	Team	Make	Time	Speed
1	23	Sam Mayer	Sigma Performance Services	Chevrolet	1:17.200	92.858
2	18	William Sawalich	Joe Gibbs Racing	Toyota	1:17.932	91.926
3	42	Brandon Jones	Cook Racing Technologies	Chevrolet	1:18.093	91.737
Full practice results

== Qualifying ==
Qualifying was held on Friday, June 7, at 12:10 p.m. PST. The qualifying system used is a multi-car, multi-lap based system. All drivers will be on track for a 20-minute timed session, and whoever sets the fastest time in the session will win the pole.

Sam Mayer, driving for Sigma Performance Services, would score the pole for the race, with a lap of 1.17.138, and a speed of 92.873 mph (149.465 km/h).

=== Qualifying results ===
Pos.	#	Driver	Team	Make	Time	Speed
1	23	Sam Mayer	Sigma Performance Services	Chevrolet	1:17.138	92.873
2	18	William Sawalich	Joe Gibbs Racing	Toyota	1:17.367	92.598
3	42	Brandon Jones	Cook Racing Technologies	Chevrolet	1:18.008	91.837
4	15	Brent Crews	Venturini Motorsports	Toyota	1:18.067	91.767
5	20	Gio Ruggiero	Venturini Motorsports	Toyota	1:18.299	91.495
6	30	Noah Gragson	Rette Jones Racing	Ford	1:18.395	91.383
7	50	Trevor Huddleston	High Point Racing	Ford	1:19.270	90.375
8	16	Jack Wood	Bill McAnally Racing	Chevrolet	1:19.301	90.339
9	4	Eric Nascimento	Nascimento Motorsports	Toyota	1:19.383	90.246
10	13	Tyler Reif	Central Coast Racing	Ford	1:19.507	90.105
11	12	Kyle Keller	Kennealy Keller Motorsports	Chevrolet	1:19.537	90.071
12	5	Sean Hingorani	Jerry Pitts Racing	Toyota	1:19.577	90.026
13	17	Marco Andretti	Cook Racing Technologies	Chevrolet	1:19.641	89.954
14	55	Isabella Robusto	Venturini Motorsports	Toyota	1:19.749	89.832
15	32	Dale Quarterley	1/4 Ley Racing	Chevrolet	1:19.899	89.663
16	6	Caleb Shrader	Jerry Pitts Racing	Ford	1:19.986	89.566
17	41	Johnny Borneman III	Lowden Jackson Motorsports	Ford	1:20:909	88.544
18	3	Todd Souza	Central Coast Racing	Toyota	1:21.380	88.031
19	80	Brian Kamisky	Derek Copeland Racing	Chevrolet	1:21.513	87.888
20	52	Ryan Philpott	Philpott Race Cars	Toyota	1:22.100	87.259
21	71	Nick Joanides	Jan's Towing Racing	Ford	1:23.736	85.555
22	1	Robbie Kennealy (R)	Kennealy Keller Motorsports	Chevrolet	1:24.181	85.102
23	68	Rodd Kneeland	Rodd Racing	Chevrolet	1:25.819	83.478
24	27	Bobby Hillis Jr.	Fierce Creature Racing	Chevrolet	1:26.848	82.489
25	05	David Smith	Shockwave Motorsports	Toyota	1:29.300	80.224
26	7	Takuma Koga	Jerry Pitts Racing	Toyota	–	–
27	19	Eric Johnson Jr. (R)	Bill McAnally Racing	Chevrolet	–	–
28	77	Dave Smith	Performance P–1 Motorsports	Toyota	–	–
29	0	Tony Huffman	Fierce Creature Racing	Chevrolet	–	–
30	21	Travis McCullough	Nascimento Motorsports	Toyota	–	–
31	86	Tim Spurgeon	Spurgeon Motorsports	Chevrolet	–	–
Official qualifying results

== Race results ==
Fin	St	#	Driver	Team	Make	Laps	Led	Status	Pts
1	1	23	Sam Mayer	Sigma Performance Services	Chevrolet	67	37	Running	49
2	10	13	Tyler Reif	Central Coast Racing	Ford	67	0	Running	42
3	12	5	Sean Hingorani	Jerry Pitts Racing	Toyota	67	0	Running	41
4	2	18	William Sawalich	Joe Gibbs Racing	Toyota	67	21	Running	41
5	8	16	Jack Wood	Bill McAnally Racing	Chevrolet	67	0	Running	39
6	14	55	Isabella Robusto	Venturini Motorsports	Toyota	67	0	Running	38
7	27	19	Eric Johnson Jr. (R)	Bill McAnally Racing	Chevrolet	67	0	Running	37
8	3	42	Brandon Jones	Cook Racing Technologies	Chevrolet	67	0	Running	36
9	11	12	Kyle Keller	Kennealy Keller Motorsports	Chevrolet	67	0	Running	35
10	30	21	Travis McCullough	Nascimento Motorsports	Toyota	67	0	Running	34
11	13	17	Marco Andretti	Cook Racing Technologies	Chevrolet	67	0	Running	33
12	31	86	Tim Spurgeon	Spurgeon Motorsports	Chevrolet	67	0	Running	32
13	26	7	Takuma Koga	Jerry Pitts Racing	Toyota	67	0	Running	31
14	15	32	Dale Quarterley	1/4 Ley Racing	Chevrolet	67	0	Running	30
15	23	68	Rodd Kneeland	Rodd Racing	Chevrolet	66	0	Running	29
16	6	30	Noah Gragson	Rette Jones Racing	Ford	66	6	Running	29
17	22	1	Robbie Kennealy (R)	Kennealy Keller Motorsports	Chevrolet	65	0	Running	27
18	7	50	Trevor Huddleston	High Point Racing	Ford	65	0	Running	26
19	21	71	Nick Joanides	Jan's Towing Racing	Ford	65	0	Running	25
20	25	05	David Smith	Shockwave Motorsports	Toyota	62	0	Running	24
21	19	80	Brian Kamisky	Derek Copeland Racing	Chevrolet	42	3	Mechanical	24
22	9	4	Eric Nascimento	Nascimento Motorsports	Toyota	39	0	Mechanical	22
23	4	15	Brent Crews	Venturini Motorsports	Toyota	31	0	Lost Wheel	21
24	17	41	Johnny Borneman III	Lowden Jackson Motorsports	Ford	30	0	Suspension	20
25	5	20	Gio Ruggiero	Venturini Motorsports	Toyota	22	0	Mechanical	19
26	28	77	Dave Smith	Performance P–1 Motorsports	Toyota	21	0	Transmission	18
27	16	6	Caleb Shrader	Jerry Pitts Racing	Ford	14	0	Handling	17
28	24	27	Bobby Hillis Jr.	Fierce Creature Racing	Chevrolet	12	0	Shock Mount	16
29	18	3	Todd Souza	Central Coast Racing	Toyota	9	0	Mechanical	15
30	20	52	Ryan Philpott	Philpott Race Cars	Toyota	1	0	Axle	14
31	29	0	Tony Huffman	Fierce Creature Racing	Chevrolet	0	0	Brakes	13
Official race results

== Standings after the race ==
Drivers' Championship standings

	Pos	Driver	Points
	1	Tyler Reif	158
	2	Sean Hingorani	148 (-10)
1	3	Jack Wood	142 (–16)
2	4	William Sawalich	137 (–13)
	5	Kyle Keller	134 (–21)
3	6	Trevor Huddleston	132 (–23)
2	7	Eric Johnson Jr.	120 (–38)
4	8	Isabella Robusto	117 (–41)
1	9	Takuma Koga	115 (–43)
3	10	Nick Joanides	112 (–46)

- Note: Only the first 10 positions are included for the driver standings.

Previous race: 2024 Portland 112	ARCA Menards Series West; 2024 season	Next race: 2024 NAPA Auto Parts 150 (Irwindale)
