= 2024 Portland 112 =

3rd race of the 2024 ARCA Menards Series West

Race details
- Race 3 of 12 of the 2024 ARCA Menards Series West
- Date: May 31, 2024
- Official name: 4th Annual Portland 112
- Location: Portland International Raceway in Portland, Oregon
- Course: Permanent racing facility
- Course length: 1.967 miles (3.166 km)
- Distance: 57 laps, 112 mi (181 km)
- Scheduled distance: 57 laps, 112 mi (181 km)
- Average speed: 65.888 mph (106.036 km/h)

Pole position
Driver	Brandon Jones	Cook Racing Technologies
- Time: 1:16.379

Most laps led
Driver	William Sawalich	Joe Gibbs Racing
- Laps: 31

Winner
No. 18	William Sawalich	Joe Gibbs Racing

Television in the United States
- Network: FloRacing
- Announcers: Charles Krall

Radio in the United States
- Radio: MRN

The 2024 Portland 112 was the 3rd stock car race of the 2024 ARCA Menards Series West season, and the 4th running of the event. The race was on Friday, May 31, 2024, at Portland International Raceway in Portland, Oregon, a 1.967 mile (3.166 km) permanent asphalt road course. The race took the scheduled 57 laps to complete. William Sawalich, driving for Joe Gibbs Racing, would successfully take the lead from Brandon Jones in the middle stages of the race, and led the final 31 laps to earn his third career ARCA Menards Series West win, and his second of the season. This was also his first road course win in his ARCA career. Jones won the pole and led the first 26 laps, before being passed by Sawalich and finishing 2nd. To fill out the podium, Isabella Robusto, driving for Venturini Motorsports, would finish 3rd, respectively.

== Report ==
=== Background ===
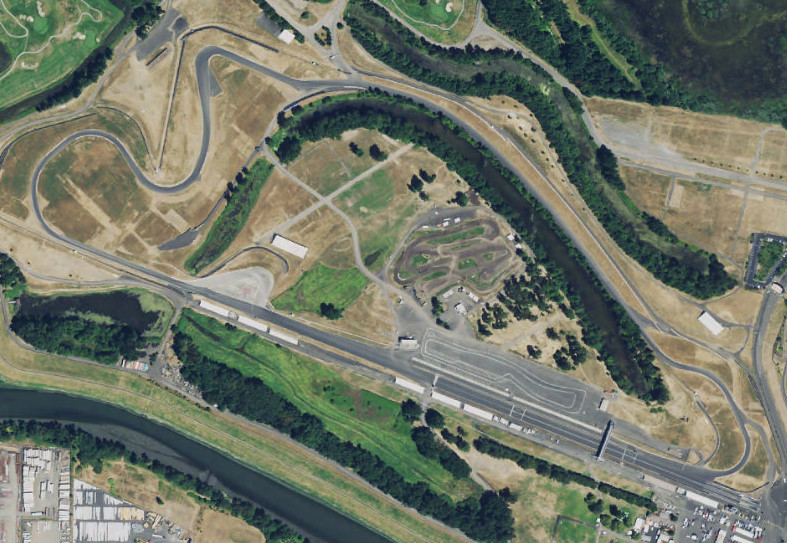
Portland International Raceway, the circuit where the race will be held.

Portland International Raceway (PIR) is a motorsport facility in Portland in the U.S. state of Oregon. It is part of the Delta Park complex on the former site of Vanport, just south of the Columbia River. It lies west of the Delta Park/Vanport light rail station and less than a mile west of Interstate 5.

The track hosts the IndyCar Series, Formula E, ICSCC and SCCA and OMRRA road racing, the ARCA Menards Series West, the NASCAR Xfinity Series, and SCCA autocross events. Additionally, the PIR grounds are host to OBRA (Oregon Bicycle Racing Association) bicycling races on the track and the surrounding grounds. The facility includes a dragstrip and a motocross track.

==== Entry list ====
- (R) denotes rookie driver.

#	Driver	Team	Make	Sponsor
0	Tony Huffman	Fierce Creature Racing	Chevrolet	Camping World / First Impression Press
1	Robbie Kennealy (R)	Kennealy Keller Motorsports	Chevrolet	Setting The Stage / American Swim Academy
3	Todd Souza	Central Coast Racing	Toyota	Central Coast Cabinets
4	Dale Quarterley	1/4 Ley Racing	Chevrolet	Van Dyk Recycling Solutions / ACI
05	David Smith	Shockwave Motorsports	Toyota	Shockwave Marine Suspension Seating
5	Sean Hingorani	Jerry Pitts Racing	Toyota	Fidelity Capital
6	Caleb Shrader	Jerry Pitts Racing	Ford	Consonus Healthcare
7	Takuma Koga	Jerry Pitts Racing	Toyota	Loop Connect
12	Kyle Keller	Kennealy Keller Motorsports	Chevrolet	Setting The Stage / Battle Born
13	Tyler Reif	Central Coast Racing	Ford	Central Coast Cabinets
15	Jake Finch	Venturini Motorsports	Toyota	Phoenix Construction
16	Jack Wood	Bill McAnally Racing	Chevrolet	NAPA Auto Care
17	Marco Andretti	Cook Racing Technologies	Chevrolet	Group 1001
18	William Sawalich	Joe Gibbs Racing	Toyota	Starkey / SoundGear
19	Eric Johnson Jr. (R)	Bill McAnally Racing	Chevrolet	Pacific Office Automation
20	Gio Ruggiero	Venturini Motorsports	Toyota	First Auto Group
23	Jake Walker	Sigma Performance Services	Toyota	SPS / GMS Fabrication
27	Bobby Hillis Jr.	Fierce Creature Racing	Chevrolet	Camping World / First Impression Press
42	Brandon Jones	Cook Racing Technologies	Chevrolet	Sprecher
50	Trevor Huddleston	High Point Racing	Ford	High Point Racing / Racecar Factory
55	Isabella Robusto	Venturini Motorsports	Toyota	Yahoo!
71	Nick Joanides	Jan's Towing Racing	Ford	Jan's Towing
77	Dave Smith	Performance P–1 Motorsports	Toyota	Global Office Inc / PP1M
88	Tanner Reif	Naake Klauer Motorsports	Ford	Vegas Fastener Manufacturing
Official entry list

== Practice ==
The first and only practice session was held on Friday, May 31, at 11:35 AM PST, and would last for 1 hour. William Sawalich, driving for Joe Gibbs Racing, would set the fastest time in the session, with a lap of 1:16.933, and a speed of 92.184 mph (148.356 km/h).

Pos.	#	Driver	Team	Make	Time	Speed
1	18	William Sawalich	Joe Gibbs Racing	Toyota	1:16.933	92.184
2	42	Brandon Jones	Cook Racing Technologies	Chevrolet	1:17.074	92.015
3	6	Caleb Shrader	Jerry Pitts Racing	Ford	1:17.653	91.329
Full practice results

== Qualifying ==
Qualifying was held on Friday, May 31, at 2:30 PM PST. The qualifying system used is a multi-car, multi-lap based system. All drivers will be on track for a 20-minute timed session, and whoever sets the fastest time in the session will win the pole.

Brandon Jones, driving for Cook Racing Technologies, would score the pole for the race, with a lap of 1.16.379, and a speed of 92.853 mph (149.432 km/h).

=== Qualifying results ===
Pos.	#	Driver	Team	Make	Time	Speed
1	42	Brandon Jones	Cook Racing Technologies	Chevrolet	1.16.379	92.853
2	18	William Sawalich	Joe Gibbs Racing	Toyota	1.17.101	91.983
3	17	Marco Andretti	Cook Racing Technologies	Chevrolet	1.17.777	91.184
4	16	Jack Wood	Bill McAnally Racing	Chevrolet	1.17.779	91.181
5	13	Tyler Reif	Central Coast Racing	Ford	1.17.891	91.050
6	5	Sean Hingorani	Jerry Pitts Racing	Toyota	1.17.967	90.962
7	20	Gio Ruggiero	Venturini Motorsports	Toyota	1.18.095	90.812
8	23	Jake Walker	Sigma Performance Services	Toyota	1.18.131	90.771
9	4	Dale Quarterley	1/4 Ley Racing	Chevrolet	1.18.166	90.730
10	6	Caleb Shrader	Jerry Pitts Racing	Ford	1.18.185	90.708
11	88	Tanner Reif	Naake Klauer Motorsports	Ford	1.18.327	90.543
12	50	Trevor Huddleston	High Point Racing	Ford	1.18.372	90.492
13	55	Isabella Robusto	Venturini Motorsports	Toyota	1.18.447	90,405
14	19	Eric Johnson Jr. (R)	Bill McAnally Racing	Chevrolet	1.18.891	89.896
15	12	Kyle Keller	Kennealy Keller Motorsports	Chevrolet	1.18.940	89.840
16	3	Todd Souza	Central Coast Racing	Toyota	1.19.107	89.651
17	15	Jake Finch	Venturini Motorsports	Toyota	1.20.796	87.777
18	7	Takuma Koga	Jerry Pitts Racing	Toyota	1.21.094	87.454
19	77	Dave Smith	Performance P–1 Motorsports	Toyota	1.21.622	86.888
20	71	Nick Joanides	Jan's Towing Racing	Ford	1.21.784	86.716
21	1	Robbie Kennealy (R)	Kennealy Keller Motorsports	Chevrolet	1.21.821	86.677
22	27	Bobby Hillis Jr.	Fierce Creature Racing	Chevrolet	1.24.135	84.293
23	05	David Smith	Shockwave Motorsports	Toyota	1.27.655	80.908
24	0	Tony Huffman	Fierce Creature Racing	Chevrolet	–	–
Official qualifying results

== Race results ==
Fin	St	#	Driver	Team	Make	Laps	Led	Status	Pts
1	2	18	William Sawalich	Joe Gibbs Racing	Toyota	57	31	Running	48
2	1	42	Brandon Jones	Cook Racing Technologies	Chevrolet	57	26	Running	44
3	13	55	Isabella Robusto	Venturini Motorsports	Toyota	57	0	Running	41
4	5	13	Tyler Reif	Central Coast Racing	Ford	57	0	Running	40
5	7	20	Gio Ruggiero	Venturini Motorsports	Toyota	57	0	Running	39
6	9	4	Dale Quarterley	1/4 Ley Racing	Chevrolet	57	0	Running	38
7	3	17	Marco Andretti	Cook Racing Technologies	Chevrolet	57	0	Running	37
8	12	50	Trevor Huddleston	High Point Racing	Ford	57	0	Running	36
9	15	12	Kyle Keller	Kennealy Keller Motorsports	Chevrolet	57	0	Running	35
10	18	7	Takuma Koga	Jerry Pitts Racing	Toyota	57	0	Running	34
11	17	15	Jake Finch	Venturini Motorsports	Toyota	57	0	Running	33
13	4	16	Jack Wood	Bill McAnally Racing	Chevrolet	57	0	Running	32
12	21	1	Robbie Kennealy (R)	Kennealy Keller Motorsports	Chevrolet	57	0	Running	31
14	20	71	Nick Joanides	Jan's Towing Racing	Ford	57	0	Running	30
15	22	27	Bobby Hillis Jr.	Fierce Creature Racing	Chevrolet	57	0	Running	29
16	6	5	Sean Hingorani	Jerry Pitts Racing	Toyota	54	0	Running	28
17	23	05	David Smith	Shockwave Motorsports	Toyota	52	0	Running	27
18	8	23	Jake Walker	Sigma Performance Services	Toyota	48	0	Mechanical	26
19	14	19	Eric Johnson Jr. (R)	Bill McAnally Racing	Chevrolet	45	0	Accident	25
20	11	88	Tanner Reif	Naake Klauer Motorsports	Ford	45	0	Mechanical	24
21	10	6	Caleb Shrader	Jerry Pitts Racing	Ford	20	0	Drive Train	23
22	16	3	Todd Souza	Central Coast Racing	Toyota	4	0	Accident	22
23	19	77	Dave Smith	Performance P–1 Motorsports	Toyota	0	0	DNS	21
24	24	0	Tony Huffman	Fierce Creature Racing	Chevrolet	0	0	DNS	20
Official race results

== Standings after the race ==
Drivers' Championship standings

	Pos	Driver	Points
1	1	Tyler Reif	116
1	2	Sean Hingorani	107 (-9)
	3	Trevor Huddleston	106 (–10)
	4	Jack Wood	103 (–13)
	5	Kyle Keller	98 (–18)
4	6	William Sawalich	96 (–20)
1	7	Nick Joanides	87 (–29)
1	8	Takuma Koga	84 (–32)
2	9	Eric Johnson Jr.	83 (–33)
9	10	Gio Ruggiero	82 (–34)

- Note: Only the first 10 positions are included for the driver standings.

Previous race: 2024 MMI Oil Workers 150	ARCA Menards Series West; 2024 season	Next race: 2024 General Tire 200
