= 2025 General Tire 200 (Sonoma) =

6th race of the 2025 ARCA Menards Series West

Race details
- Race 6 of 12 of the 2025 ARCA Menards Series West
- Date: July 11, 2025
- Official name: 19th Annual General Tire 200
- Location: Sonoma Raceway in Sonoma, California
- Course: Permanent racing facility
- Course length: 1.99 miles (3.20 km)
- Distance: 65 laps, 129.35 mi (208.169 km)
- Scheduled distance: 64 laps, 127 mi (205 km)

Pole position
Driver	William Sawalich	Joe Gibbs Racing
- Time: 1:17.507

Most laps led
Driver	William Sawalich	Joe Gibbs Racing
- Laps: 65

Winner
No. 18	William Sawalich	Joe Gibbs Racing

Television in the United States
- Network: Tubi; FloRacing
- Announcers: Charles Krall

Radio in the United States
- Radio: ARCA Racing Network

The 2025 General Tire 200 was the 6th stock car race of the 2025 ARCA Menards Series West season, and the 19th running of the event. The race was held on Friday, July 11, 2025, at Sonoma Raceway in Sonoma, California, a 1.99 mile (3.20 km) permanent asphalt road course. Originally scheduled to be contested over 64 laps, the race was extended to 65 laps due to an overtime finish. William Sawalich, driving for Joe Gibbs Racing, would dominate the race, leading all 65 laps and earning his fourth career ARCA Menards Series West win. Sawalich won the race by a measly 0.066 seconds over Christian Eckes, driving for Bill McAnally Racing. To fill out the podium, Alon Day, driving for Venturini Motorsports, would finish 3rd, respectively.

== Report ==
=== Background ===
Layout of Sonoma Raceway, the track where the race will be held.

Sonoma Raceway is a 1.99-mile (3.20 km) road course and drag strip located on the landform known as Sears Point in the southern Sonoma Mountains in Sonoma, California, U.S. The road course features 12 turns on a hilly course with 160 feet (49 m) of total elevation change. It is host to one of only seven NASCAR Cup Series races each year that are run on road courses. It is also host to the NTT IndyCar Series and several other auto races and motorcycle races such as the American Federation of Motorcyclists series. Sonoma Raceway continues to host amateur, or club racing events which may or may not be open to the general public. The largest such car club is the Sports Car Club of America. In 2022, the race was reverted to racing the club configuration.

==== Entry list ====
- (R) denotes rookie driver.

#	Driver	Team	Make	Sponsor
1	Robbie Kennealy (R)	Jan's Towing Racing	Ford	Jan's Towing
3	Todd Souza	Central Coast Racing	Toyota	Central Coast Cabinets
4	Eric Nascimento	Nascimento Motorsports	Toyota	Impact Transportation / Phillips Bros Fab
05	David Smith	Shockwave Motorsports	Toyota	Shockwave Marine Suspension Seating
5	Eric Johnson Jr.	Jerry Pitts Racing	Toyota	Sherwin-Williams
6	Caleb Shrader	Jerry Pitts Racing	Ford	Consonus Healthcare
7	Corey Day	Spire Motorsports	Chevrolet	HendrickCars.com
8	Jeff Anton	1/4 Ley Racing	Chevrolet	Deer Park Recycling
13	Tanner Reif	Central Coast Racing	Toyota	Central Coast Cabinets
14	Davey Magras	Davey Magras Racing	Chevrolet	Advanced Autoworks / Koerner Racing Engines
16	Jack Wood	Bill McAnally Racing	Chevrolet	Weyerhaeuser / James Hardie
17	Kaylee Bryson	Cook Racing Technologies	Chevrolet	LSI Logical Logistics LLC / MMI Services
18	William Sawalich	Joe Gibbs Racing	Toyota	Starkey
19	Christian Eckes	Bill McAnally Racing	Chevrolet	NAPA Auto Care / NAPA Nightvision
23	Spencer Gallagher	Clark Racing	Chevrolet	SPS / Allegiant Travel Company
24	Tyler Reif	Sigma Performance Services	Chevrolet	SPS / Vegas Fastener Manufacturing
25	Alon Day	Venturini Motorsports	Toyota	JSSI
32	Dale Quarterley	1/4 Ley Racing	Chevrolet	Van Dyk Recycling Solutions
50	Trevor Huddleston	High Point Racing	Ford	High Point Racing / Racecar Factory
51	Blake Lothian (R)	Strike Mamba Racing	Chevrolet	Texas Lawbook
52	Ryan Philpott	Philpott Race Cars	Toyota	Mattos Transport / Hacienda Pools
68	Rodd Kneeland	Rodd Racing	Chevrolet	Rodd Renovations
71	Kyle Keller	Jan's Towing Racing	Ford	Jan's Towing
72	Jonathan Reaume	Strike Mamba Racing	Chevrolet	RBR Engineering
77	Nick Joanides	Performance P–1 Motorsports	Toyota	King Taco / Weber's Auto Parts
88	Will Rodgers	Naake-Klauer Motorsports	Ford	Shockwave Marine Suspension Seating
Official entry list

== Practice ==
The first and only practice session was held on Friday, July 11, at 10:40 AM PST, and would last for 1 hour and 20 minutes. William Sawalich, driving for Joe Gibbs Racing, would set the fastest time in the session, with a lap of 1:17.505, and a speed of 92.433 mph (148.756 km/h).

Pos.	#	Driver	Team	Make	Time	Speed
1	18	William Sawalich	Joe Gibbs Racing	Toyota	1:17.505	92.433
2	25	Alon Day	Venturini Motorsports	Toyota	1:18.156	91.663
3	7	Corey Day	Spire Motorsports	Chevrolet	1:18.169	91.648
Full practice results

== Qualifying ==
Qualifying was held on Friday, July 11, at 12:10 PM PST. The qualifying procedure used is a multi-car, multi-lap based system. All drivers will be on track for a 20-minute timed session, and whoever sets the fastest time in that session will win the pole.

William Sawalich, driving for Joe Gibbs Racing, would score the pole for the race, with a lap of 1:17.507, and a speed of 92.430 mph (148.752 km/h).

=== Qualifying results ===
Pos.	#	Driver	Team	Make	Time	Speed
1	18	William Sawalich	Joe Gibbs Racing	Toyota	1:17.507	92.430
2	25	Alon Day	Venturini Motorsports	Toyota	1:17.518	92.417
3	7	Corey Day	Spire Motorsports	Chevrolet	1:17.948	91.907
4	24	Tyler Reif	Sigma Performance Services	Chevrolet	1:18.181	91.634
5	19	Christian Eckes	Bill McAnally Racing	Chevrolet	1:18.398	91.380
6	16	Jack Wood	Bill McAnally Racing	Chevrolet	1:18.507	91.253
7	6	Caleb Shrader	Jerry Pitts Racing	Ford	1:18.731	90.993
8	50	Trevor Huddleston	High Point Racing	Ford	1:19.159	90.501
9	4	Eric Nascimento	Nascimento Motorsports	Toyota	1:19.168	90.491
10	71	Kyle Keller	Jan's Towing Racing	Ford	1:19.197	90.458
11	32	Dale Quarterley	1/4 Ley Racing	Chevrolet	1:19.234	90.416
12	88	Will Rodgers	Naake-Klauer Motorsports	Ford	1:19.458	90.161
13	13	Tanner Reif	Central Coast Racing	Toyota	1:20.134	89.400
14	1	Robbie Kennealy (R)	Jan's Towing Racing	Ford	1:20.167	89.363
15	5	Eric Johnson Jr.	Jerry Pitts Racing	Toyota	1:20.901	88.553
16	8	Jeff Anton	1/4 Ley Racing	Chevrolet	1:21.278	88.142
17	3	Todd Souza	Central Coast Racing	Toyota	1:21.406	88.003
18	52	Ryan Philpott	Philpott Race Cars	Toyota	1:22.299	87.048
19	14	Davey Magras	Davey Magras Racing	Chevrolet	1:22.954	86.361
20	17	Kaylee Bryson	Cook Racing Technologies	Chevrolet	1:23.089	86.221
21	68	Rodd Kneeland	Rodd Racing	Chevrolet	1:23.172	86.135
22	51	Blake Lothian (R)	Strike Mamba Racing	Chevrolet	1:31.170	78.578
23	05	David Smith	Shockwave Motorsports	Toyota	1:31.924	77.934
24	72	Jonathan Reaume	Strike Mamba Racing	Chevrolet	1:35.411	75.086
25	23	Spencer Gallagher	Clark Racing	Chevrolet	–	–
26	77	Nick Joanides	Performance P–1 Motorsports	Toyota	–	–
Official qualifying results

== Race results ==
Fin	St	#	Driver	Team	Make	Laps	Led	Status	Pts
1	1	18	William Sawalich	Joe Gibbs Racing	Toyota	65	65	Running	48
2	5	19	Christian Eckes	Bill McAnally Racing	Chevrolet	65	0	Running	42
3	2	25	Alon Day	Venturini Motorsports	Toyota	65	0	Running	41
4	8	50	Trevor Huddleston	High Point Racing	Ford	65	0	Running	40
5	4	24	Tyler Reif	Sigma Performance Services	Chevrolet	65	0	Running	39
6	9	4	Eric Nascimento	Nascimento Motorsports	Toyota	65	0	Running	38
7	3	7	Corey Day	Spire Motorsports	Chevrolet	65	0	Running	37
8	10	71	Kyle Keller	Jan's Towing Racing	Ford	65	0	Running	36
9	13	13	Tanner Reif	Central Coast Racing	Toyota	65	0	Running	35
10	16	8	Jeff Anton	1/4 Ley Racing	Chevrolet	65	0	Running	34
11	7	6	Caleb Shrader	Jerry Pitts Racing	Ford	65	0	Running	33
12	18	52	Ryan Philpott	Philpott Race Cars	Toyota	65	0	Running	32
13	6	16	Jack Wood	Bill McAnally Racing	Chevrolet	65	0	Running	31
14	20	17	Kaylee Bryson	Cook Racing Technologies	Chevrolet	64	0	Running	30
15	19	14	Davey Magras	Davey Magras Racing	Chevrolet	62	0	Running	29
16	24	72	Jonathan Reaume	Strike Mamba Racing	Chevrolet	61	0	Running	28
17	15	5	Eric Johnson Jr.	Jerry Pitts Racing	Toyota	60	0	Running	27
18	25	23	Spencer Gallagher	Clark Racing	Chevrolet	60	0	Running	26
19	22	51	Blake Lothian (R)	Strike Mamba Racing	Chevrolet	59	0	Running	25
20	23	05	David Smith	Shockwave Motorsports	Toyota	57	0	Running	24
21	14	1	Robbie Kennealy (R)	Jan's Towing Racing	Ford	51	0	Accident	23
22	21	68	Rodd Kneeland	Rodd Racing	Chevrolet	50	0	Accident	22
23	17	3	Todd Souza	Central Coast Racing	Toyota	36	0	Suspension	21
24	11	32	Dale Quarterley	1/4 Ley Racing	Chevrolet	27	0	Accident	20
25	12	88	Will Rodgers	Naake-Klauer Motorsports	Ford	16	0	Mechanical	19
26	26	77	Nick Joanides	Performance P–1 Motorsports	Toyota	9	0	Mechanical	18
Official race results

== Standings after the race ==
Drivers' Championship standings

Pos	Driver	Points
1	Trevor Huddleston	299
2	Tanner Reif	285 (–14)
3	Kyle Keller	284 (–15)
4	Eric Johnson Jr.	271 (–28)
5	Robbie Kennealy	264 (–35)
6	Blake Lothian	241 (–58)
7	David Smith	221 (–78)
8	Jake Bollman	145 (–154)
9	Todd Souza	127 (–172)
10	Cody Dennison	98 (–201)

- Note: Only the first 10 positions are included for the driver standings.

Previous race: 2025 NAPA Auto Parts 150 (Kern Raceway)	ARCA Menards Series West; 2025 season	Next race: 2025 NAPA Auto Care 150
