= 2024 NAPA Auto Parts 150 (Kern Raceway) =

11th race of the 2024 ARCA Menards Series West

2024 NAPA Auto Parts 150 presented by West Coast Stock Car Motorsports Hall of Fame
Race details
- Race 11 of 12 in the 2024 ARCA Menards Series West season
- Date: October 26, 2024
- Location: Kevin Harvick's Kern Raceway in Bakersfield, California
- Course: Permanent racing facility
- Course length: 0.50 miles (0.80 km)
- Distance: 150 laps, 50 mi (80 km)
- Scheduled distance: 150 laps, 50 mi (80 km)
- Average speed: 71.315 miles per hour (114.770 km/h)

Pole position
Driver	Sean Hingorani	Venturini Motorsports
- Time: 18.218

Most laps led
Driver	Sean Hingorani	Venturini Motorsports
- Laps: 150

Winner
No. 15	Sean Hingorani	Venturini Motorsports

Television in the United States
- Network: FloRacing
- Announcers: Charles Krall

Radio in the United States
- Radio: ARCA Racing Network

The 2024 NAPA Auto Parts 150 presented by West Coast Stock Car Motorsports Hall of Fame was the 11th stock car race of the 2024 ARCA Menards Series West season, and the third iteration of the event. The race was held on Saturday, October 26, 2024, at Kevin Harvick's Kern Raceway in Bakersfield, California, a 0.50 mile (0.80 km) permanent quad-oval shaped racetrack. The race took the scheduled 150 laps to complete. In an action-packed race, Sean Hingorani, driving for Venturini Motorsports, would lead flag-to-flag, leading every lap of the race from the pole to earn his seventh career ARCA Menards Series West win and his second of the season. To fill out the podium, Brent Crews, driving for Venturini Motorsports, and Trevor Huddleston, driving for High Point Racing, would finish 2nd and 3rd, respectively.

== Report ==
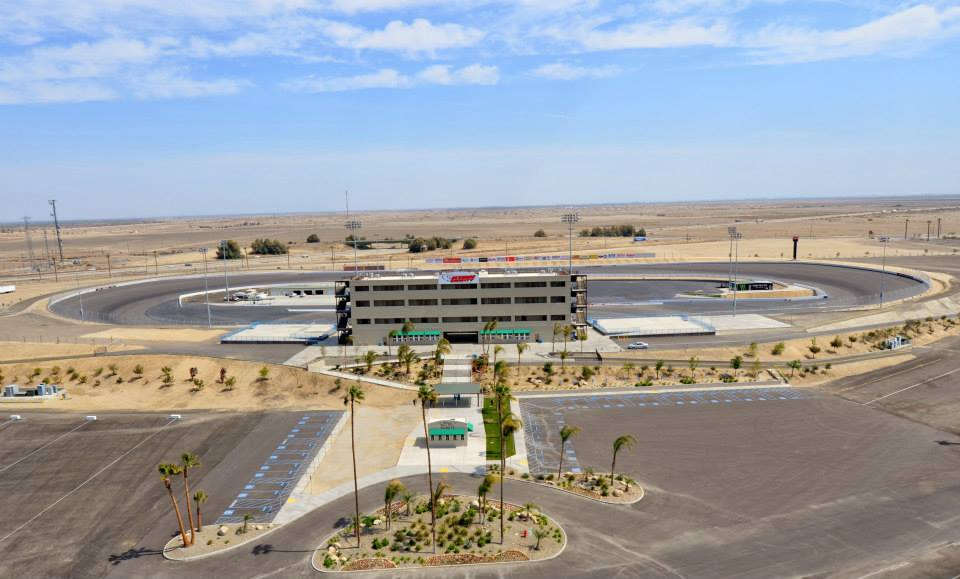
Kevin Harvick's Kern Raceway, the circuit where the race was held.

Kevin Harvick's Kern Raceway (formerly Kern County Raceway Park) is a 0.5-mile (0.80 km) oval speedway located on CA 43 (Enos Lane) just off Interstate 5 in Bakersfield, Kern County, California, United States. Opened in 2013, it was built as a replacement for Mesa Marin Raceway.

Kevin Harvick's Kern Raceway hosts events with NASCAR's Whelen All-American Series along with an ARCA Menards Series West race since 2013.

The track has banks of 8° in the straightaways, with 14° paved corners. The track has 15,000 seats for fans, and room to expand to 17,000 seats for various events. It also contains 21 suites in the grandstand along with 18 concession stands.

=== Entry list ===
- (R) denotes rookie driver.

#	Driver	Team	Make	Sponsor
3	Todd Souza	Central Coast Racing	Toyota	Central Coast Cabinets
4	Eric Nascimento	Nascimento Motorsports	Chevrolet	Impact Transportation / RJs Paintshop
05	David Smith	Shockwave Motorsports	Toyota	Shockwave Marine Suspension Seating
5	Kole Raz	Jerry Pitts Racing	Toyota	Cyclum Renewables Truck Stops
6	Henry Barton	Jerry Pitts Racing	Toyota	Turn One io
7	Takuma Koga	Jerry Pitts Racing	Toyota	Takt Diesien / CKB
9	Kyle Keller	Jan's Towing Racing	Ford	Jan's Towing
12	Joey Kennealy	Kennealy Keller Motorsports	Chevrolet	STS / American Swim Academy
13	Tyler Reif	Central Coast Racing	Toyota	Central Coast Cabinets
15	Sean Hingorani	Venturini Motorsports	Toyota	Fidelity Capital
16	Jack Wood	Bill McAnally Racing	Chevrolet	NAPA Auto Care
17	Buddy Shepherd	Cook Racing Technologies	Chevrolet	HS Towing
19	Eric Johnson Jr. (R)	Bill McAnally Racing	Chevrolet	Pacific Office Automation
20	Brent Crews	Venturini Motorsports	Toyota	JBL
21	Ethan Nascimento	Nascimento Motorsports	Toyota	Impact Transportation / Phillips Bros Fab
23	Jaron Giannini	Sigma Performance Services	Toyota	Versatile & Stone / SPS / GMS Fabrication
42	Spencer Davis	Cook Racing Technologies	Chevrolet	MMI Services
50	Trevor Huddleston	High Point Racing	Ford	High Point Racing / Racecar Factory
55	Isabella Robusto	Venturini Motorsports	Toyota	Mobil 1
71	Rip Michels	Jan's Towing Racing	Ford	Jan's Towing
Official entry list

== Practice ==
The first and only practice session was held on Saturday, October 26, at 3:00 p.m. PST, and would last for 1 hour. Rip Michels, driving for Jan's Towing Racing, would set the fastest time in the session, with a lap of 18.523, and a speed of 97.176 mph (156.390 km/h).

Pos.	#	Driver	Team	Make	Time	Speed
1	71	Rip Michels	Jan's Towing Racing	Ford	18.523	97.176
2	13	Tyler Reif	Central Coast Racing	Toyota	18.651	96.51
3	17	Buddy Shepherd	Cook Racing Technologies	Chevrolet	18.69	69.308
Full practice results

== Qualifying ==
Qualifying was held on Saturday, October 26, at 5:00 p.m. PST. The qualifying system used is a multi-car, multi-lap based system. All drivers will be on track for a 20-minute timed session, and whoever sets the fastest time in that session will win the pole.

Sean Hingorani, driving for Venturini Motorsports, would score the pole for the race, with a lap of 18.218, and a speed of 98.803 mph (159.008 km/h).

=== Qualifying results ===
Pos.	#	Driver	Team	Make	Time	Speed
1	15	Sean Hingorani	Venturini Motorsports	Toyota	18.218	98.803
2	71	Rip Michels	Jan's Towing Racing	Ford	18.298	98.371
3	5	Kole Raz	Jerry Pitts Racing	Toyota	18.371	97.981
4	17	Buddy Shepherd	Cook Racing Technologies	Chevrolet	18.371	97.981
5	13	Tyler Reif	Central Coast Racing	Toyota	18.391	97.874
6	16	Jack Wood	Bill McAnally Racing	Chevrolet	18.462	97.498
7	23	Jaron Giannini	Sigma Performance Services	Toyota	18.464	97.487
8	42	Spencer Davis	Cook Racing Technologies	Chevrolet	18.514	97.224
9	50	Trevor Huddleston	High Point Racing	Ford	18.526	97.161
10	20	Brent Crews	Venturini Motorsports	Toyota	18.616	96.691
11	9	Kyle Keller	Jan's Towing Racing	Ford	18.72	96.154
12	6	Henry Barton	Jerry Pitts Racing	Toyota	18.743	96.036
13	3	Todd Souza	Central Coast Racing	Toyota	18.745	96.026
14	4	Eric Nascimento	Nascimento Motorsports	Chevrolet	18.754	95.98
15	55	Isabella Robusto	Venturini Motorsports	Toyota	18.773	95.882
16	19	Eric Johnson Jr. (R)	Bill McAnally Racing	Chevrolet	18.816	95.663
17	21	Ethan Nascimento	Nascimento Motorsports	Toyota	18.828	95.602
18	7	Takuma Koga	Jerry Pitts Racing	Toyota	19.115	94.167
19	12	Joey Kennealy	Kennealy Keller Motorsports	Chevrolet	19.14	94.044
20	05	David Smith	Shockwave Motorsports	Toyota	20.1	89.552
Official qualifying results

== Race results ==
Fin	St	#	Driver	Team	Make	Laps	Led	Status	Pts
1	1	15	Sean Hingorani	Venturini Motorsports	Toyota	150	150	Running	49
2	10	20	Brent Crews	Venturini Motorsports	Toyota	150	0	Running	42
3	9	50	Trevor Huddleston	High Point Racing	Ford	150	0	Running	41
4	5	13	Tyler Reif	Central Coast Racing	Toyota	150	0	Running	40
5	6	16	Jack Wood	Bill McAnally Racing	Chevrolet	150	0	Running	39
6	3	5	Kole Raz	Jerry Pitts Racing	Toyota	150	0	Running	38
7	7	23	Jaron Giannini	Sigma Performance Services	Toyota	150	0	Running	37
8	2	71	Rip Michels	Jan's Towing Racing	Ford	149	0	Running	36
9	16	19	Eric Johnson Jr. (R)	Bill McAnally Racing	Chevrolet	149	0	Running	35
10	17	21	Ethan Nascimento	Motorsports	Toyota	149	0	Running	34
11	8	42	Spencer Davis	Cook Racing Technologies	Chevrolet	149	0	Running	33
12	12	6	Henry Barton	Jerry Pitts Racing	Toyota	147	0	Running	32
13	13	3	Todd Souza	Central Coast Racing	Toyota	147	0	Running	31
14	19	12	Joey Kennealy	Kennealy Keller Motorsports	Chevrolet	146	0	Running	30
15	18	7	Takuma Koga	Jerry Pitts Racing	Toyota	144	0	Running	29
16	20	05	David Smith	Shockwave Motorsports	Toyota	136	0	Running	28
17	14	4	Eric Nascimento	Nascimento Motorsports	Chevrolet	99	0	Engine	27
18	15	55	Isabella Robusto	Venturini Motorsports	Toyota	87	0	Accident	26
19	11	9	Kyle Keller	Jan's Towing Racing	Ford	77	0	Engine	25
20	4	17	Buddy Shepherd	Cook Racing Technologies	Chevrolet	72	0	Engine	25
Official race results

== Standings after the race ==
Drivers' Championship standings

Pos	Driver	Points
1	Sean Hingorani	560
2	Tyler Reif	548 (–12)
3	Trevor Huddleston	526 (–34)
4	Jack Wood	503 (–57)
5	Kyle Keller	479 (–81)
6	Eric Johnson Jr.	461 (–99)
7	Takuma Koga	447 (–113)
8	David Smith	400 (–160)
9	Todd Souza	360 (–200)
10	Nick Joanides	310 (–250)

- Note: Only the first 10 positions are included for the driver standings.

Previous race: 2024 NAPA Auto Parts 150 (Roseville)	ARCA Menards Series West; 2024 season	Next race: 2024 Desert Diamond Casino West Valley 100
