= Gavin Ray =

American racing driver (born 2006)

- Ray at Madera Speedway in 2026
- Born: July 18, 2006 (age 20); Las Vegas, Nevada, U.S.

ARCA Menards Series career
- 1 race run over 1 year
- Best finish: 127th (2026)
- First race: 2026 General Tire 150 (Phoenix)
Wins	Top tens	Poles
0	0	0

ARCA Menards Series West career
- 16 races run over 2 years
- Best finish: 8th (2026)
- First race: 2025 West Coast Stock Car Motorsports Hall of Fame 150 (Bakersfield)
- Last race: 2026 NAPA Auto Parts 150 (Bakersfield)
Wins	Top tens	Poles
0	7	0
- Statistics up to date as of November 2, 2026.

Gavin Ray (born July 18, 2006) is an American professional stock car racing driver. He last competed full-time in the ARCA Menards Series West, driving the No. 7 Toyota/Ford for Jerry Pitts Racing.

== Racing career ==
Ray has previously competes in series such as the CARS Tour West Limited Pro Late Model Series, the SRL SPEARS Pro Late Model Series, the Legends Tour West Series, and the Silver State Road Course Series.

In 2025, it was revealed that Ray would make his debut in the ARCA Menards Series West at Kevin Harvick's Kern Raceway, driving the No. 7 Toyota for Jerry Pitts Racing. After qualifying in ninth, he finished on the lead lap in sixth place. He then ran the final two races of the season at with JPR, this time driving the No. 6, where he finished seventh at the Las Vegas Motor Speedway Bullring, and 13th at Phoenix Raceway.

Ray's No. 7 car at All American Speedway in 2026

In 2026, it was revealed that Ray would return to the West Series with JPR in the No. 7, this time running the full schedule. He finished eighth in the points with six top-ten finishes and a best result of fifth at Tucson Speedway.

== Motorsports results ==
=== Stock car career summary ===
Season	Series	Team	Races	Wins	Top 5	Top 10	Points	Position
2025	ARCA Menards Series West	Jerry Pitts Racing	3	0	0	2	156	13th
2026	ARCA Menards Series West	Jerry Pitts Racing	13	0	1	6	560	8th
2026	ARCA Menards Series	Jerry Pitts Racing	1	0	0	0	15	127th

=== ARCA Menards Series ===
(key) (Bold – Pole position awarded by qualifying time. Italics – Pole position earned by points standings or practice time. * – Most laps led. ** – All laps led.)

ARCA Menards Series results
Year	Team	No.	Make	1	2	3	4	5	6	7	8	9	10	11	12	13	14	15	16	17	18	19	20	AMSC	Pts	Ref
2026	Jerry Pitts Racing	7	Toyota	DAY	PHO; 29	KAN	TAL	GLN	TOL	MCH	POC	BER	ELK	CHI	LRP	IRP	IOW	ISF	MAD	DSF	SLM	BRI	KAN	127th	15	

==== ARCA Menards Series West ====
ARCA Menards Series West results
Year	Team	No.	Make	1	2	3	4	5	6	7	8	9	10	11	12	13	AMSWC	Pts	Ref
2025	Jerry Pitts Racing	7	Toyota	KER; 6	PHO	TUC	CNS	KER	SON	TRI	PIR	AAS	MAD				13th	156	
2025	Jerry Pitts Racing	6	Toyota											LVS; 7	PHO; 13		13th	156	
2026	Jerry Pitts Racing	7	Toyota	KER; 9	PHO; 29	TUC; 5	SHA; 13	CNS; 9	TRI; 7			AAS; 13	MAD; 19	LVS; 11	PHO; 12	KER; 15	8th	560	
2026	Jerry Pitts Racing	7	Ford							SON; 10	PIR; 10						8th	560	
