= Buddy Shepherd =

American racing driver (born 1999)

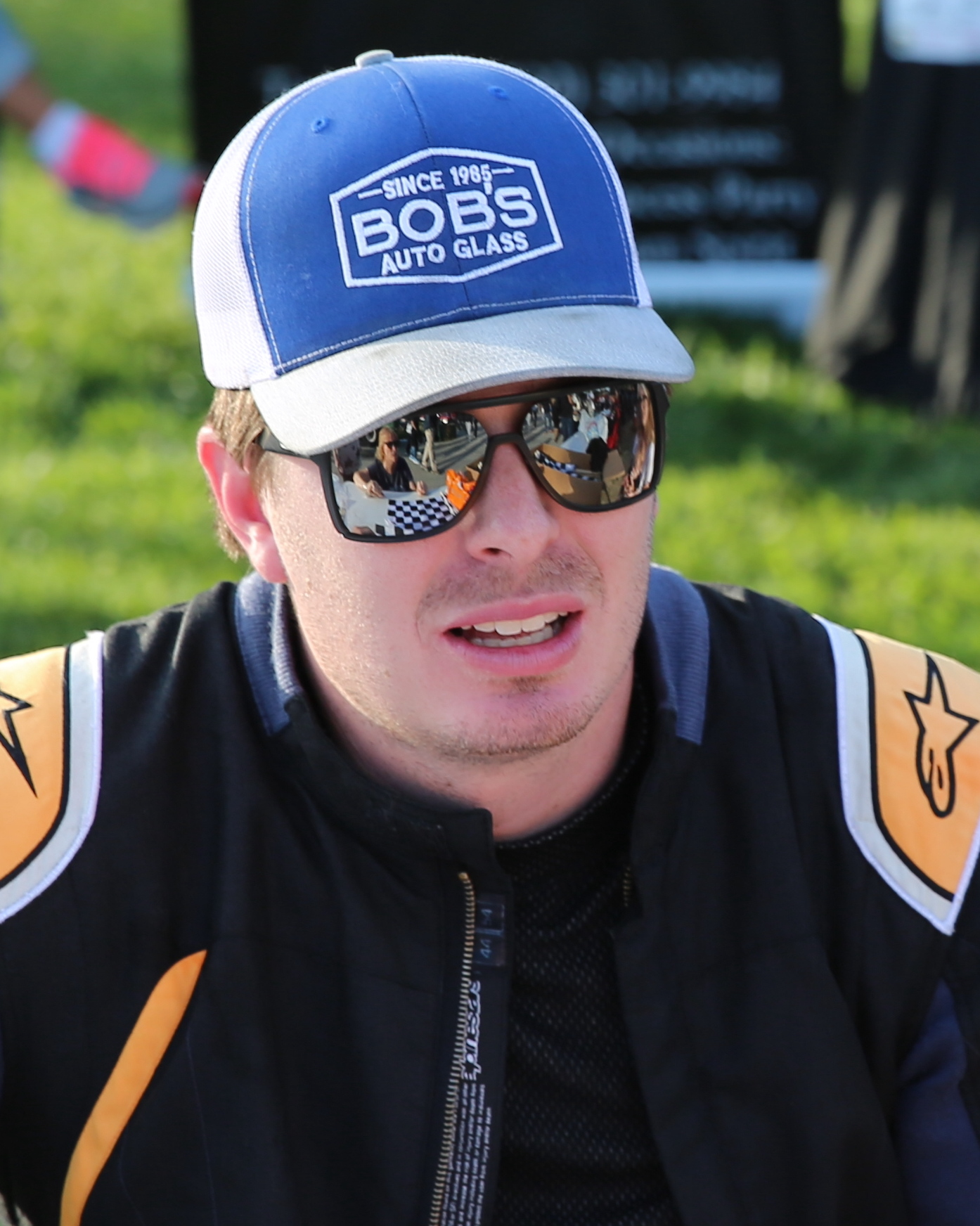
- Shepherd at All American Speedway in 2023
- Born: October 9, 1999 (age 27); Bakersfield, California, U.S.

ARCA Menards Series West career
- 12 races run over 8 years
- Best finish: 28th (2022)
- First race: 2015 Bill Schmitt Memorial 150 (Shasta)
- Last race: 2025 NAPA Auto Parts 150 presented by the West Coast Stock Car Motorsports Hall of Fame (Bakersfield)
Wins	Top tens	Poles
0	7	0
- Statistics up to date as of February 28, 2026.

Buddy Shepherd (born October 9, 1999) is an American professional stock car racing driver who last competed part-time in the ARCA Menards Series West, driving the No. 6 Toyota for Jerry Pitts Racing.

== Racing career ==
In 2015, Shepherd would make his NASCAR K&N Pro Series West debut at Shasta Speedway, driving the No. 55 Ford for Jefferson Pitts Racing at the age of fifteen, where he would finish in fifth place. He would make another start with the team at Meridian Speedway, where he would finish third. For the following year, Shepherd would run one race at Kern County Raceway Park, where he would finish nineteenth after starting twelfth. He would then run at Douglas County Speedway in 2017, this time driving the No. 27, where he would finish sixth, before moving back to the No. 55 for the season finale at Kern County, where he would finish seventh. In 2018, Shepherd would make one start at the Las Vegas Motor Speedway dirt-track in the No. 27, where he would finish 23rd due to a crash eight laps into the race, and would run at Roseville the following year, where he would finish seventh.

From 2020 to early 2022, Shepherd would compete in various series such as the SRL Spears Southwest Tour Series, where he would finish third in the points in 2021 with six top-fives and eight top-ten finishes, the CRA Super Series, the and Southern Super Series.

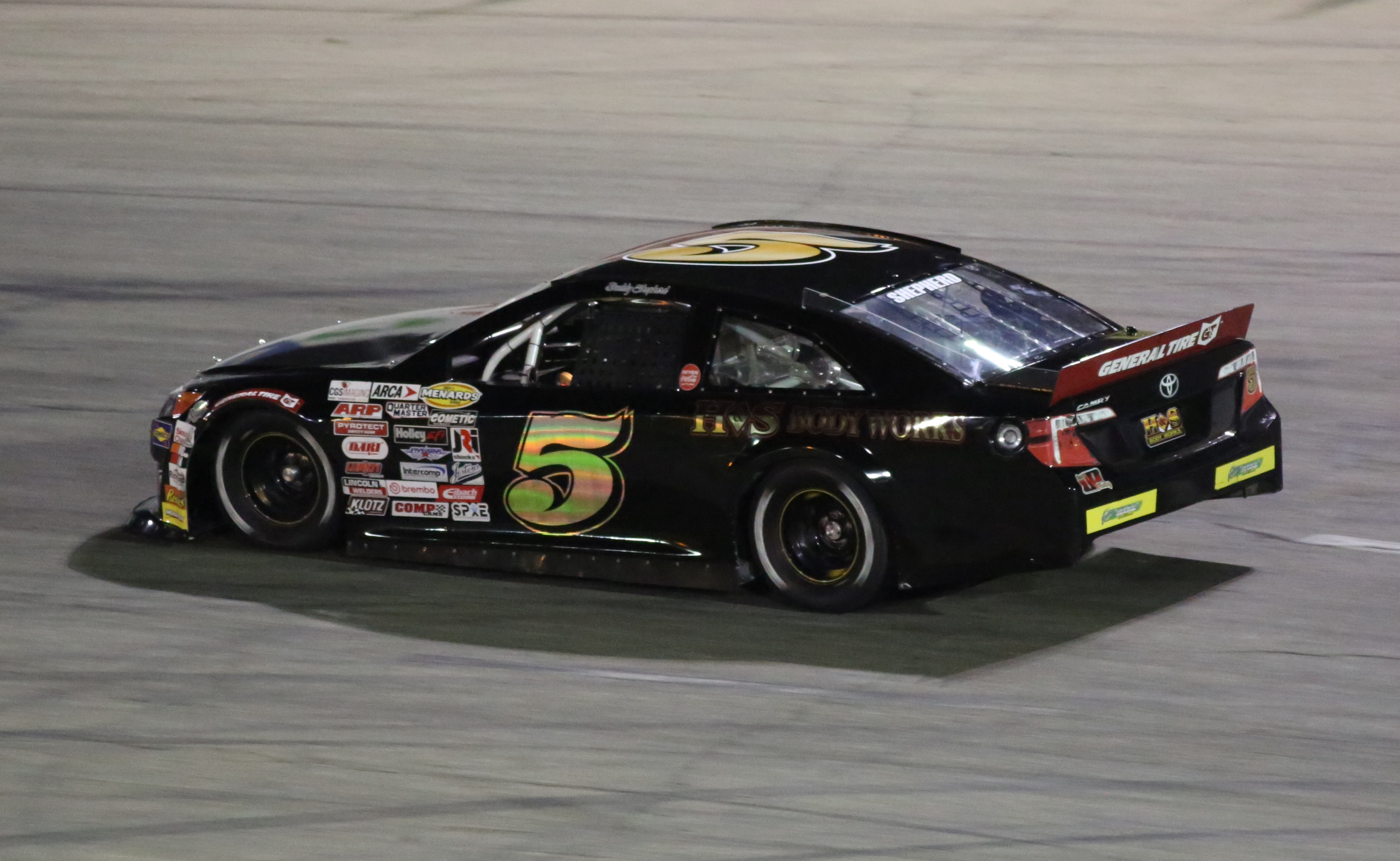
Shepherd's No. 5 ARCA car at All American Speedway in 2023

In October 2022, Shepherd would make his return to the now ARCA Menards Series West at the Las Vegas Motor Speedway Bullring, driving the No. 17 Toyota for McGowan Motorsports, where he would start twelfth and finish in fifth place. He would then compete in the next race with the team at Phoenix Raceway, where he would start tenth and go on to finish eleventh. In 2023, he would run with Jerry Pitts Racing at Roseville, where he would drive the No. 5 Toyota, where he would start fifth and finish in sixth place.

== Motorsports results ==
=== Stock car career summary ===
Season	Series	Team	Races	Wins	Top 5	Top 10	Points	Position
2015	NASCAR K&N Pro Series West	Jefferson Pitts Racing	2	0	2	2	80	29th
2016	NASCAR K&N Pro Series West	Jefferson Pitts Racing	1	0	0	0	25	52nd
2017	NASCAR K&N Pro Series West	Jefferson Pitts Racing	2	0	0	2	75	29th
2018	NASCAR K&N Pro Series West	Jefferson Pitts Racing	1	0	0	0	21	60th
2019	NASCAR K&N Pro Series West	Jefferson Pitts Racing	1	0	0	1	37	44th
2022	ARCA Menards Series West	McGowan Motorsports	2	0	1	1	122	28th
2023	ARCA Menards Series West	Jerry Pitts Racing	1	0	0	1	38	42nd
2024	ARCA Menards Series West	Cook Racing Technologies	1	0	0	0	24	67th
2025	ASA STARS National Tour	Richard Shepherd	1	0	0	0	27	69th
2025	ARCA Menards Series West	Jerry Pitts Racing	1	0	0	0	29	66th
2026	ASA STARS National Tour	Richard Shepherd	1	0	0	0		

=== ARCA Menards Series West ===
(key) (Bold – Pole position awarded by qualifying time. Italics – Pole position earned by points standings or practice time. * – Most laps led. ** – All laps led.)

ARCA Menards Series West results
Year	Team	No.	Make	1	2	3	4	5	6	7	8	9	10	11	12	13	14	AMSWC	Pts	Ref
2015	Jefferson Pitts Racing	55	Ford	KCR	IRW	TUS	IOW	SHA; 5	SON	SLS	IOW	EVG	CNS	MER; 3	AAS	PHO		29th	80	
2016	Jefferson Pitts Racing	55	Ford	IRW	KCR; 19	TUS	OSS	CNS	SON	SLS	IOW	EVG	DCS	MMP	MMP	MER	AAS	52nd	25	
2017	Jefferson Pitts Racing	27	Ford	TUS	KCR	IRW	IRW	SPO	OSS	CNS	SON	IOW	EVG	DCS; 6	MER	AAS		29th	75	
2017	Jefferson Pitts Racing	55	Ford														KCR; 7	29th	75	
2018	Jefferson Pitts Racing	27	Ford	KCR	TUS	TUS	OSS	CNS	SON	DCS	IOW	EVG	GTW	LVS; 23	MER	AAS	KCR	60th	21	
2019	Jefferson Pitts Racing	27	Ford	LVS	IRW	TUS	TUS	CNS	SON	DCS	IOW	EVG	GTW	MER	AAS; 7	KCR	PHO	44th	37	
2022	McGowan Motorsports	17	Toyota	PHO	IRW	KCR	PIR	SON	IRW	EVG	PIR	AAS	LVS; 5	PHO; 11				28th	122	
2023	Jerry Pitts Racing	5	Toyota	PHO	IRW	KCR	PIR	SON	IRW	SHA	EVG	AAS; 6	LVS	MAD	PHO			42nd	38	
2024	Cook Racing Technologies	17	Chevy	PHO	KER	PIR	SON	IRW	IRW	SHA	TRI	MAD	AAS	KER; 20	PHO			67th	24	
2025	Jerry Pitts Racing	6	Toyota	KER	PHO	TUC	CNS	KER; 15	SON	TRI	PIR	AAS	MAD	LVS	PHO			66th	29	

=== ASA STARS National Tour ===
(key) (Bold – Pole position awarded by qualifying time. Italics – Pole position earned by points standings or practice time. * – Most laps led. ** – All laps led.)

ASA STARS National Tour results
Year	Team	No.	Make	1	2	3	4	5	6	7	8	9	10	11	12	ASNTC	Pts	Ref
2025	Richard Shepherd	22S	N/A	NSM	FIF; 25	DOM	HCY	NPS	MAD	SLG	AND	OWO	TOL	WIN	NSV	69th	27	
2026	Richard Shepherd	22S	N/A	NSM	FIF	HCY	SLG	MAD	NPS	OWO	TRI	WIN	NSV; 14	NSM		-*	-*	
