= Dustin Ash =

American racing driver and crew chief (born 1988)

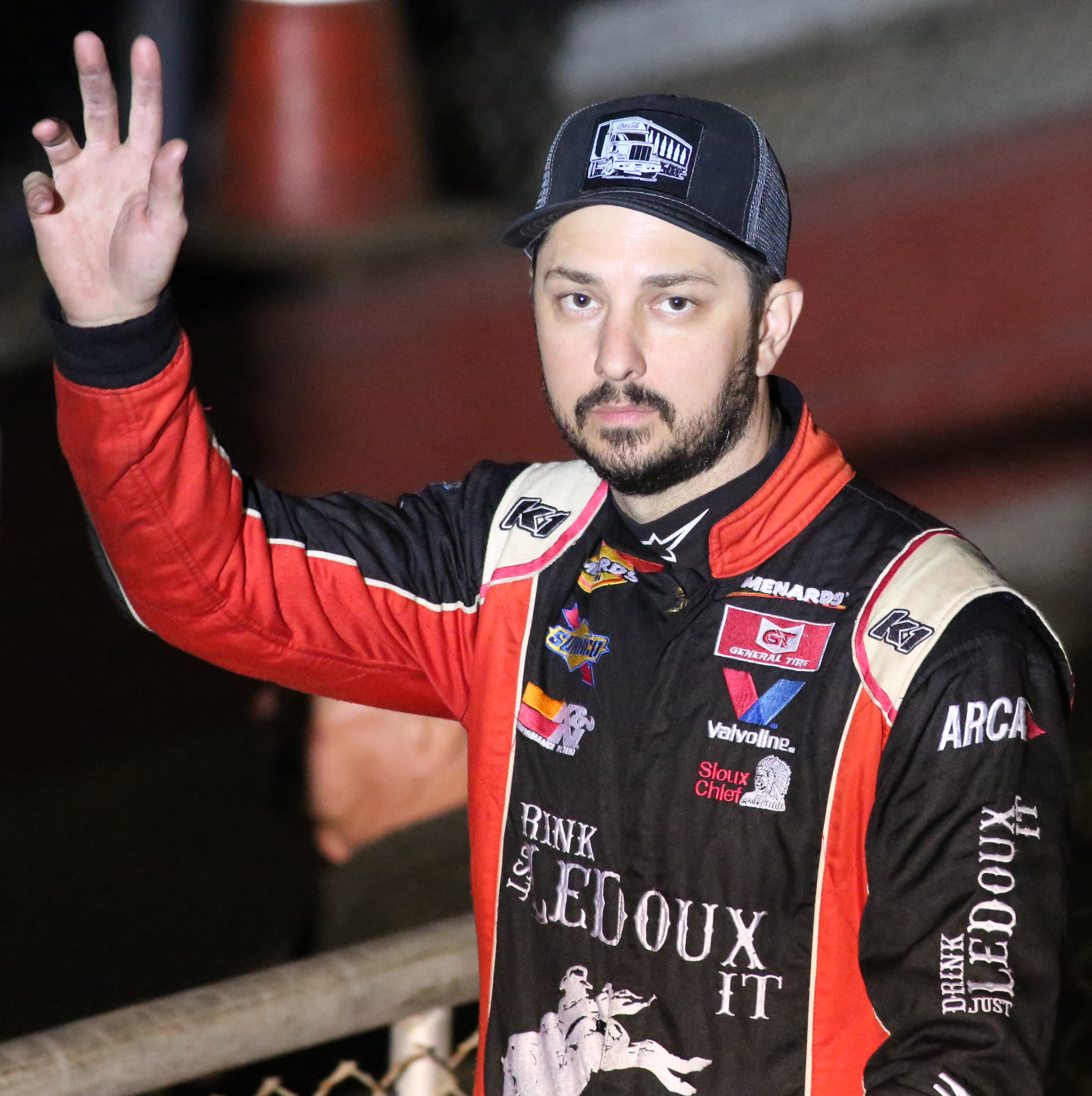
- Ash at Madera Speedway in 2023
- Born: April 19, 1988 (age 38); Las Vegas, Nevada, U.S.

ARCA Menards Series West career
- 6 races run over 4 years
- Best finish: 27th (2019)
- First race: 2015 NAPA Auto Parts Wildcat 150 (Tucson)
- Last race: 2023 ARCA West 150 presented by the West Coast Stock Car Motorsports Hall of Fame (Madera)
Wins	Top tens	Poles
0	4	0
- Statistics up to date as of March 6, 2024.

Dustin K. Ash (born April 19, 1988) is an American professional stock car racing driver and crew chief who last competed part-time in the ARCA Menards Series West, driving the No. 5 Toyota for Jerry Pitts Racing.

Ash is a longtime competitor at the Las Vegas Motor Speedway Bullring, where he has amassed several wins and four track championships, and has also served as a mentor for drivers such as Noah Gragson, Riley Herbst, and Zane Smith.

== Racing career ==
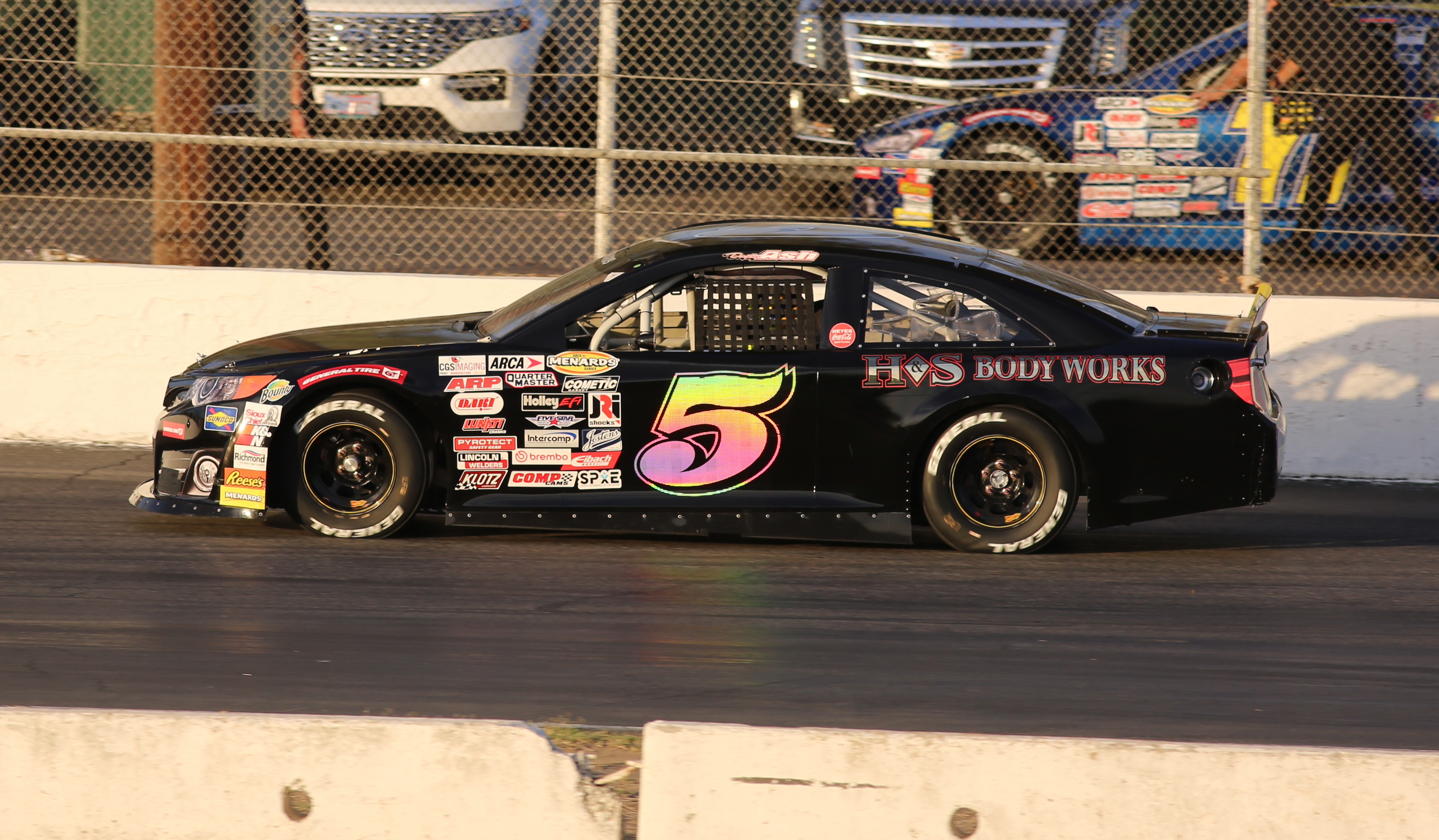
Ash's No. 5 ARCA car at Madera Speedway in 2023

Ash first began his racing career in BMX and motocross before moving to go-karts and eventually to legends cars and late models.

In 2015, Ash made his debut in the NASCAR K&N Pro Series at Tucson Speedway, driving the No. 55 Ford for Jefferson Pitts Racing, where he started sixth and finished in third position. Afterwards, he did not make another start in the series until 2019, where he participated in both events at Tucson, this time driving the No. 7 for JPR; he finished ninth in the first race, and finished seventh in the second race. For the following year, his returned to the now ARCA Menards Series West, driving the No. 11 Chevrolet for Kart Idaho Racing at Irwindale Speedway, where he started and finished in eighth position.

In 2023, it was revealed that Ash would make his return to the ARCA Menards Series West at the Bullring, driving the No. 5 Toyota for Jerry Pitts Racing. After placing fourth in the only practice session, he qualified in fourth and finished one lap down in thirteenth. Ash returned with the team in the following race at Madera Speedway, where he practiced twelfth, qualified in ninth and finished in eighteenth due to a crash.

== Motorsports results ==
=== ARCA Menards Series West ===
(key) (Bold – Pole position awarded by qualifying time. Italics – Pole position earned by points standings or practice time. * – Most laps led.)

ARCA Menards Series West results
Year	Team	No.	Make	1	2	3	4	5	6	7	8	9	10	11	12	13	14	AMSWC	Pts	Ref
2015	Jefferson Pitts Racing	55	Ford	KCR	IRW	TUS; 3	IOW	SHA	SON	SLS	IOW	EVG	CNS	MER	AAS	PHO		42nd	41	
2019	Jefferson Pitts Racing	7	Ford	LVS	IRW	TUS; 9	TUS; 7	CNS	SON	DCS	IOW	EVG	GTW	MER	AAS	KCR	PHO	27th	73	
2020	Kart Idaho Racing	11	Chevy	LVS	MMP	MMP	IRW; 8	EVG	DCS	CNS	LVS	AAS	KCR	PHO				35th	36	
2023	Jerry Pitts Racing	5	Toyota	PHO	IRW	KCR	PIR	SON	IRW	SHA	EVG	AAS	LVS; 13	MAD; 18	PHO			34th	57	
