= Jess Havens =

American racing driver

- Born: July 17, 2003 (age 23); Spokane, Washington, U.S.

ARCA Menards Series West career
- 1 race run over 1 year
- Best finish: 48th (2024)
- First race: 2024 NAPA Auto Care 150 (Tri-City)
Wins	Top tens	Poles
0	1	0
- Statistics up to date as of September 15, 2024.

Jess Havens (born July 17, 2003) is an American professional stock car racing driver who last competed part-time in the ARCA Menards Series West, driving the No. 6 Toyota for Jerry Pitts Racing. He is the younger brother of Braeden Havens, who also competed in what was known as the NASCAR K&N Pro Series West.

== Racing career ==
Havens has previously competed in series such as the Northwest Super Late Model Series and the Tri-State Challenge Series.

In 2024, it was revealed that Havens would make his ARCA Menards Series West debut at Tri-City Raceway, driving the No. 6 Toyota for Jerry Pitts Racing. After setting the sixth quickest time in the lone practice session, he qualified in sixth and finished on the lead lap in eighth place.

== Motorsports results ==
=== ARCA Menards Series West ===
(key) (Bold – Pole position awarded by qualifying time. Italics – Pole position earned by points standings or practice time. * – Most laps led. ** – All laps led.)

ARCA Menards Series West results
Year	Team	No.	Make	1	2	3	4	5	6	7	8	9	10	11	12	AMSWC	Pts	Ref
2024	Jerry Pitts Racing	6	Toyota	PHO	KER	PIR	SON	IRW	IRW	SHA	TRI; 8	MAD	AAS	KER	PHO	48th	36	
