= Caleb Shrader =

American racing driver

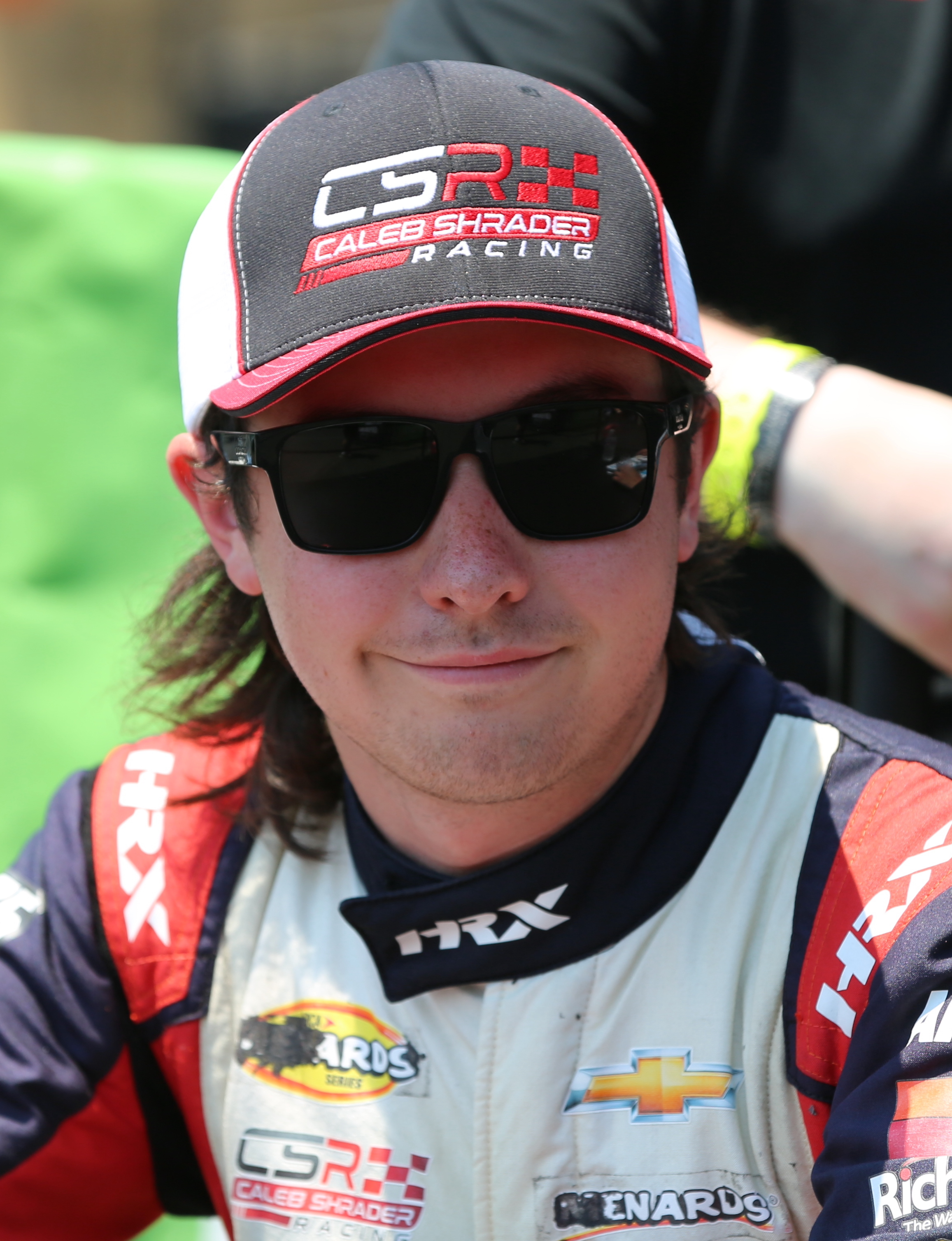
- Shrader at Sonoma Raceway in 2025
- Born: March 26, 2004 (age 22); Tigard, Oregon, U.S.

ARCA Menards Series West career
- 6 races run over 4 years
- Best finish: 20th (2025)
- First race: 2023 Portland 112 (Portland)
- Last race: 2026 Portland 112 (Portland)
Wins	Top tens	Poles
0	3	0
- Statistics up to date as of August 8, 2026.

Caleb Shrader (born March 26, 2004) is an American professional auto racing driver. He last competed part-time in the ARCA Menards Series West, driving the No. 6 Toyota for Jerry Pitts Racing. He has also competed in the Trans-Am Series, driving the No. 99 Chevrolet Camaro for DIG Motorsports.

== Racing career ==
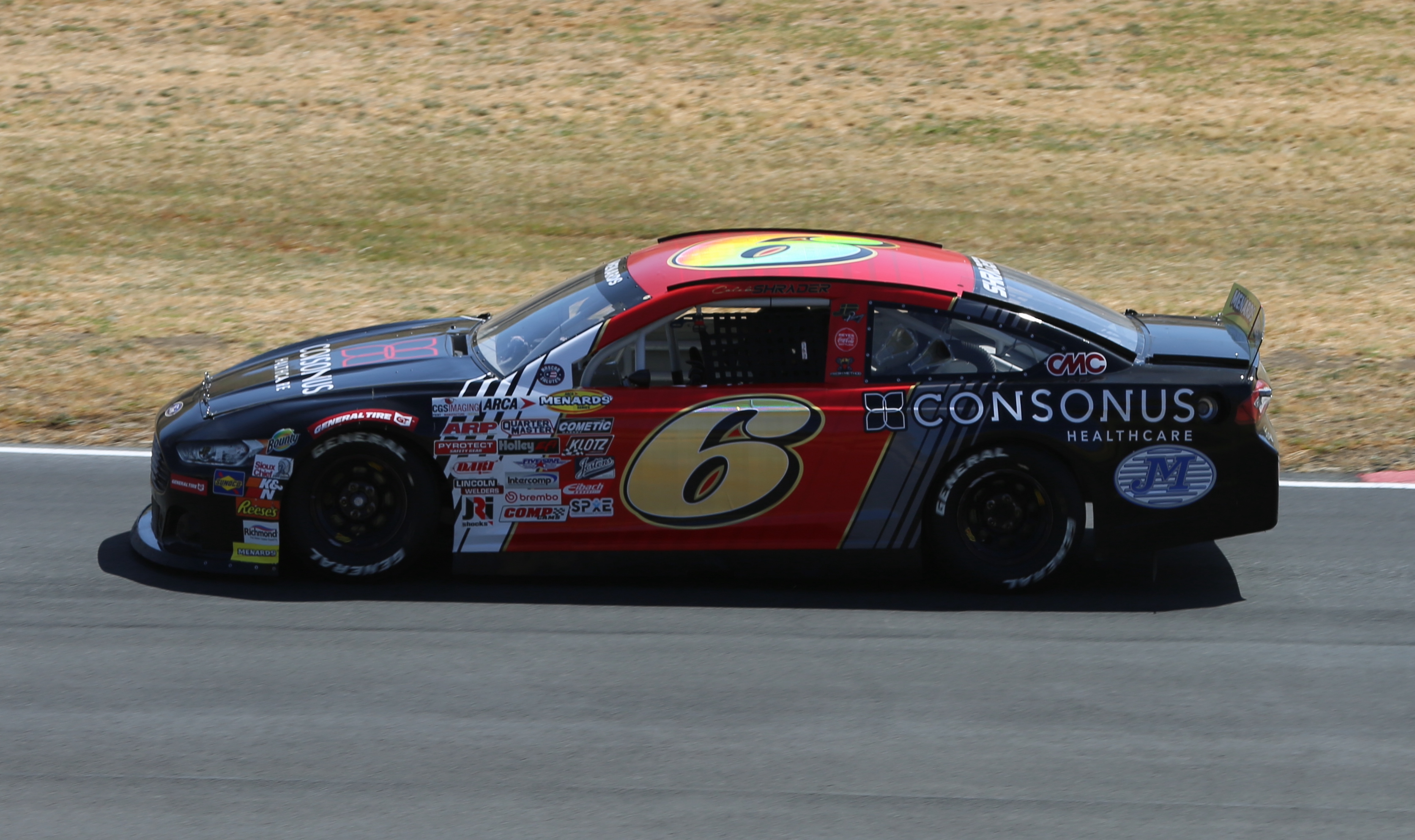
Shrader's No. 6 car at Sonoma Raceway in 2024

In 2023, Shrader made his debut in the ARCA Menards Series West at Portland International Raceway, driving the No. 99 Chevrolet for Bill McAnally Racing, where after placing thirteenth in the lone practice session, he qualified in ninth and finished on the lead lap in seventh place.

In 2024, Shrader returned to the West Series at Portland, this time driving the No. 6 Ford for Jerry Pitts Racing, where after placing third in the lone practice session, he qualified in tenth but finished in 21st.

== Motorsports results ==
=== ARCA Menards Series West ===
(key) (Bold – Pole position awarded by qualifying time. Italics – Pole position earned by points standings or practice time. * – Most laps led. ** – All laps led.)

ARCA Menards Series West results
Year	Team	No.	Make	1	2	3	4	5	6	7	8	9	10	11	12	13	AMSWC	Pts	Ref
2023	Bill McAnally Racing	99	Chevy	PHO	IRW	KCR	PIR; 7	SON	IRW	SHA	EVG	AAS	LVS	MAD	PHO		44th	37	
2024	Jerry Pitts Racing	6	Ford	PHO	KER	PIR; 21	SON; 27	IRW	IRW	SHA	TRI	MAD	AAS	KER	PHO		42nd	40	
2025	Jerry Pitts Racing	6	Toyota	KER	PHO	TUC; 6	CNS	KER									20th	107	
2025	Jerry Pitts Racing	6	Ford						SON; 11	TRI	PIR; 8	AAS	MAD	LVS	PHO		20th	107	
2026	Jerry Pitts Racing	6	Toyota	KER	PHO	TUC	SHA	CNS	TRI	SON	PIR; 23	AAS	MAD	LVS	PHO	KER	81st	21	
