= Jerry Pitts Racing =

NASCAR team

- Owner(s): Jerry Pitts; Brian Pitts
- Base: Pahrump, Nevada, U.S.
- Series: ARCA Menards Series; ARCA Menards Series West
- Race drivers: ARCA Menards Series: 5. Eric Johnson Jr. (part-time); 7. Gavin Ray (part-time); ARCA Menards Series West: 5. Eric Johnson Jr.; 6. Caleb Shrader (part-time); 7. Gavin Ray
- Manufacturer: Toyota; Ford
- Opened: 2019

Career
- Debut: ARCA Menards Series: 2021 General Tire 150 (Phoenix); ARCA Menards Series West: 2020 Star Nursery 150 (Las Vegas)
- Latest race: ARCA Menards Series: 2024 General Tire 150 (Phoenix); ARCA Menards Series West: 2026 Madera 150 (Madera)
- Races competed: 68
- Drivers' Championships: 0
- Race victories: 1
- Pole positions: 1

Jerry Pitts Racing (JPR), also called JP Racing, is an American professional stock car racing team that currently competes in the ARCA Menards Series and the ARCA Menards Series West. In the ARCA Menards Series, they field the No. 5 Toyota Camry part-time for Eric Johnson Jr., and the No. 7 Toyota Camry for Gavin Ray. In the ARCA Menards Series West, they field the No. 5 Toyota full-time for Eric Johnson Jr., the No. 6 Toyota for Caleb Shrader, and the No. 7 Toyota full-time for Gavin Ray. The team is owned by former Gene Price Motorsports crew chief, Jerry Pitts, along with his brother Brian.

== History ==
Before the team was founded, Pitts formerly co-owned Jefferson Pitts Racing, alongside fellow and former Gene Price Motorsports crew chief, Jeff Jefferson. In August 2019, it was announced that Jefferson and Pitts would form their own separate teams following the end of the season. Jefferson would remain at his base in Naches, Washington, while Pitts would relocate to Pahrump, Nevada, his hometown.

== ARCA Menards Series ==
=== Car No. 5 history ===
On December 23, 2024, it was announced that Eric Johnson Jr. would be driving the No. 5 part-time in 2025.

He subsequently joined Jerry Pitts Racing to compete full-time in the ARCA Menards Series West starting in 2025.

==== Car No. 5 results ====
ARCA Menards Series results
Year	Driver	No.	Make	1	2	3	4	5	6	7	8	9	10	11	12	13	14	15	16	17	18	19	20	AMSC	Pts	Ref
2025	Eric Johnson Jr.	5	Toyota	DAY	PHO; 11	TAL	KAN	CLT	MCH	BLN	ELK	LRP	DOV	IRP	IOW	GLN	ISF	MAD	DSF	BRI	SLM	KAN	TOL			

=== Car No. 7 history ===
Takuma Koga (2021–present)

Since 2021, the team has competed in the ARCA Menards Series/ARCA Menards Series West combination race at Phoenix Raceway, with Takuma Koga driving the No. 7 entry, as part of a full-time West Series schedule. Koga's best finish in the race was an 18th-place finish in 2022.

==== Car No. 7 results ====
ARCA Menards Series results
Year	Driver	No.	Make	1	2	3	4	5	6	7	8	9	10	11	12	13	14	15	16	17	18	19	20	AMSC	Pts	Ref
2021	Takuma Koga	7	Toyota	DAY	PHO; 23	TAL	KAN	TOL	CLT	MOH	POC	ELK	BLN	IOW	WIN	GLN	MCH	ISF	MLW	DSF	BRI	SLM	KAN	64th	21	
2022	Takuma Koga	7	Toyota	DAY	PHO; 18	TAL	KAN	CLT	IOW	BLN	ELK	MOH	POC	IRP	MCH	GLN	ISF	MLW	DSF	KAN	BRI	SLM	TOL	61st	26	
2023	Takuma Koga	7	Toyota	DAY	PHO; 19	TAL	KAN	CLT	BLN	ELK	MOH	IOW	POC	MCH	IRP	GLN	ISF	MLW	DSF	KAN	BRI	SLM	TOL	64th	25	
2024	Takuma Koga	7	Toyota	DAY	PHO; 23	TAL	DOV	KAN	CLT	IOW	MOH	BLN	IRP	SLM	ELK	MCH	ISF	MLW	DSF	GLN	BRI	KAN	TOL	69th	50	

== ARCA Menards Series West ==
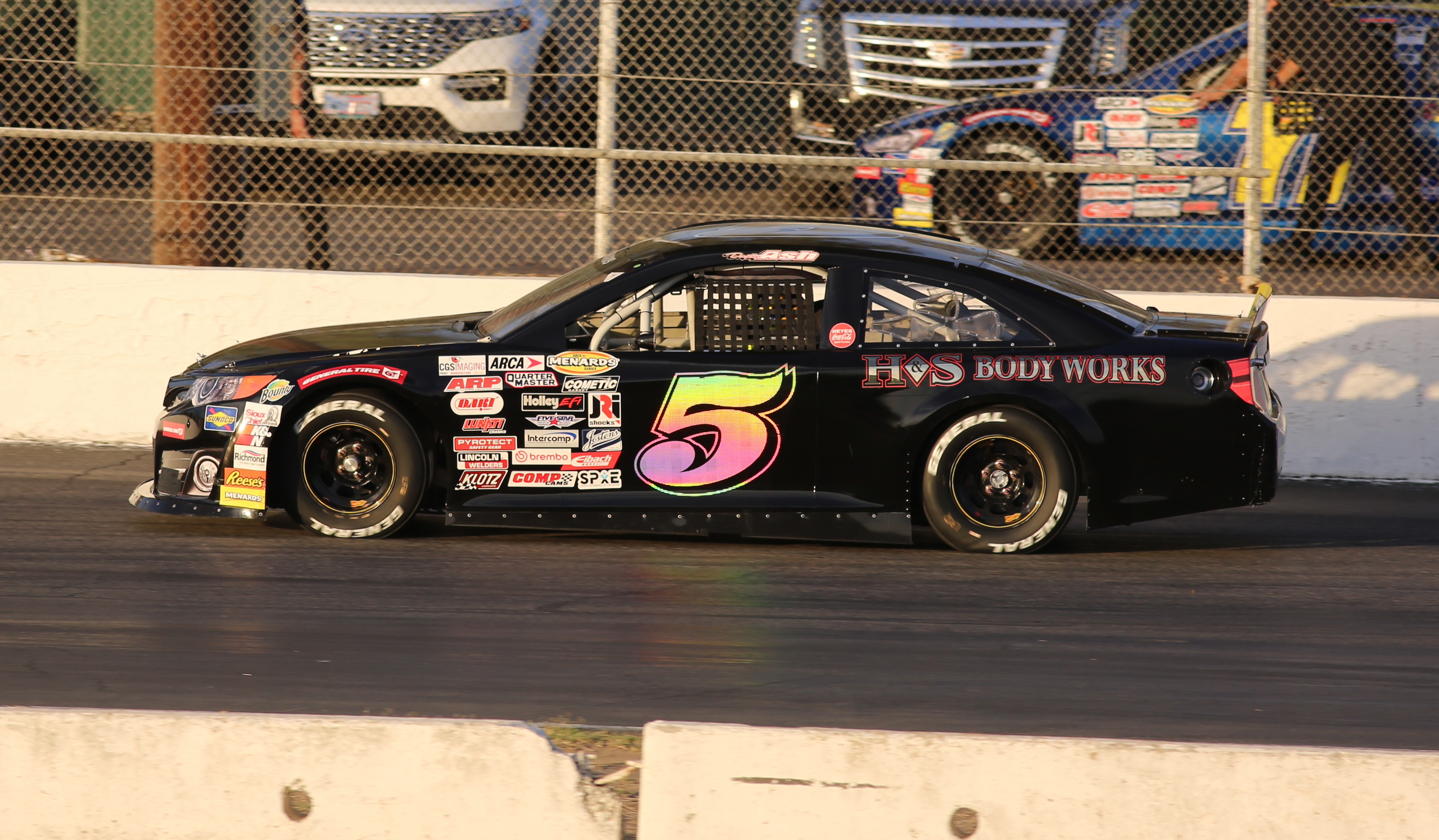
Dustin Ash's No. 5 car at Madera Speedway in 2023.

=== Car No. 5 history ===
==== Multiple drivers (2021–present) ====
In 2021, the team would run a second entry part-time, fielding the No. 5 car for Kyle Keller at the Las Vegas Motor Speedway Bullring. Keller started eighth and finished fifth in the race. They returned in 2022, fielding the car for Jacob Smith at the same track, where he started 11th and finished ninth. Smith was originally scheduled to run four races for the team in 2023, but did not end up happening. The entry was increased to seven races that year, with Xfinity Series driver Riley Herbst running the road course races at Portland and Sonoma, late model driver Kole Raz at Shasta and Evergreen, Buddy Shepherd at Roseville, and Dustin Ash at The Bullring and Madera. They scored a third-place effort with Herbst at Sonoma, along with Raz in his two starts. The team returned part-time for 2024, where Raz would give them their first career West Series win at Kevin Harvick's Kern Raceway, holding off Trevor Huddleston in a close finish. 2023 ARCA West champion Sean Hingorani was announced as the driver for Portland. Hingorani would score the teams first pole at Tri-City.

On December 23, 2024, it was announced that Eric Johnson Jr. would be driving the No. 5 full-time in 2025.

==== Car No. 5 results ====
ARCA Menards Series West results
Year	Driver	No.	Make	1	2	3	4	5	6	7	8	9	10	11	12	13	AMSWC	Pts	Ref
2021	Kyle Keller	5	Ford	PHO	SON	IRW	CNS	IRW	PIR	LVS; 5	AAS	PHO					37th	39	
2022	Jacob Smith	5	Ford	PHO	IRW	KCR	PIR	SON	IRW	EVG	PIR	AAS	LVS; 9	PHO			48th	35	
2023	Riley Herbst	5	Ford	PHO	IRW	KCR	PIR; 18	SON; 3	IRW								14th	245	
2023	Kole Raz	5	Toyota							SHA; 3	EVG; 3						14th	245	
2023	Buddy Shepherd	5	Toyota									AAS; 6					14th	245	
2023	Dustin Ash	5	Toyota										LVS; 13	MAD; 18	PHO		14th	245	
2024	Kole Raz	5	Toyota	PHO	KER; 1			IRW; 17	IRW; 6					KER; 6	PHO		11th	439	
2024	Sean Hingorani	5	Toyota			PIR; 16	SON; 3			SHA; 2	TRI; 2	MAD; 2	AAS; 4				11th	439	
2025	Eric Johnson Jr.	5	Toyota	KER; 5	PHO; 11	TUC; 2	CNS; 4	KER; 5	SON; 17	TRI; 7	PIR; 9	AAS; 5	MAD; 3	LVS; 10	PHO; 20		5th	581	
2026	Eric Johnson Jr.	5	Toyota	KER; 11	PHO; 13	TUC; 3	SHA; 6	CNS; 11	TRI; 13	SON; 3	PIR; 5	AAS; 7	MAD	LVS	PHO	KER	-*	-*	

=== Car No. 6 history ===
==== Caleb Shrader (2024) ====
In 2024, the team would run a third entry for Caleb Shrader at Portland and Sonoma, fielding the No. 6 car and at Tri-City with Jess Havens.

==== Car No. 6 results ====
ARCA Menards Series West results
Year	Driver	No.	Make	1	2	3	4	5	6	7	8	9	10	11	12	13	AMSWC	Pts	Ref
2024	Caleb Shrader	6	Ford	PHO	KER	PIR; 21	SON; 27	IRW	IRW	SHA							31st	66	
2024	Jess Havens	6	Ford								TRI; 8	MAD	AAS	KER	PHO		31st	66	
2025	Caleb Shrader	6	Toyota	KER	PHO	TUC; 6	CNS										11th	292	
2025	Caleb Shrader	6	Ford						SON; 11	TRI	PIR; 8	AAS	MAD				11th	292	
2025	Buddy Shepherd	6	Toyota					KER; 15									11th	292	
2025	Gavin Ray	6	Toyota											LVS; 7	PHO; 13		11th	292	
2026	Caleb Shrader	6	Toyota	KER	PHO	TUC	SHA	CNS	TRI	SON	PIR; 23	AAS	MAD	LVS	PHO	KER	-*	-*	

=== Car No. 7 history ===
==== Multiple drivers (2020) ====
JP Racing ran their first race as an independent team in the season-opener at The Bullring, with Austin Reed driving their No. 7 entry. Kris Wright would pilot the car for the road course doubleheader races at the Utah Motorsports Campus, finishing 2nd and 3rd in both races. Devin Dodson drove the entry at Irwindale and Phoenix, with Kyle Keller driving at The Bullring and Kern County.

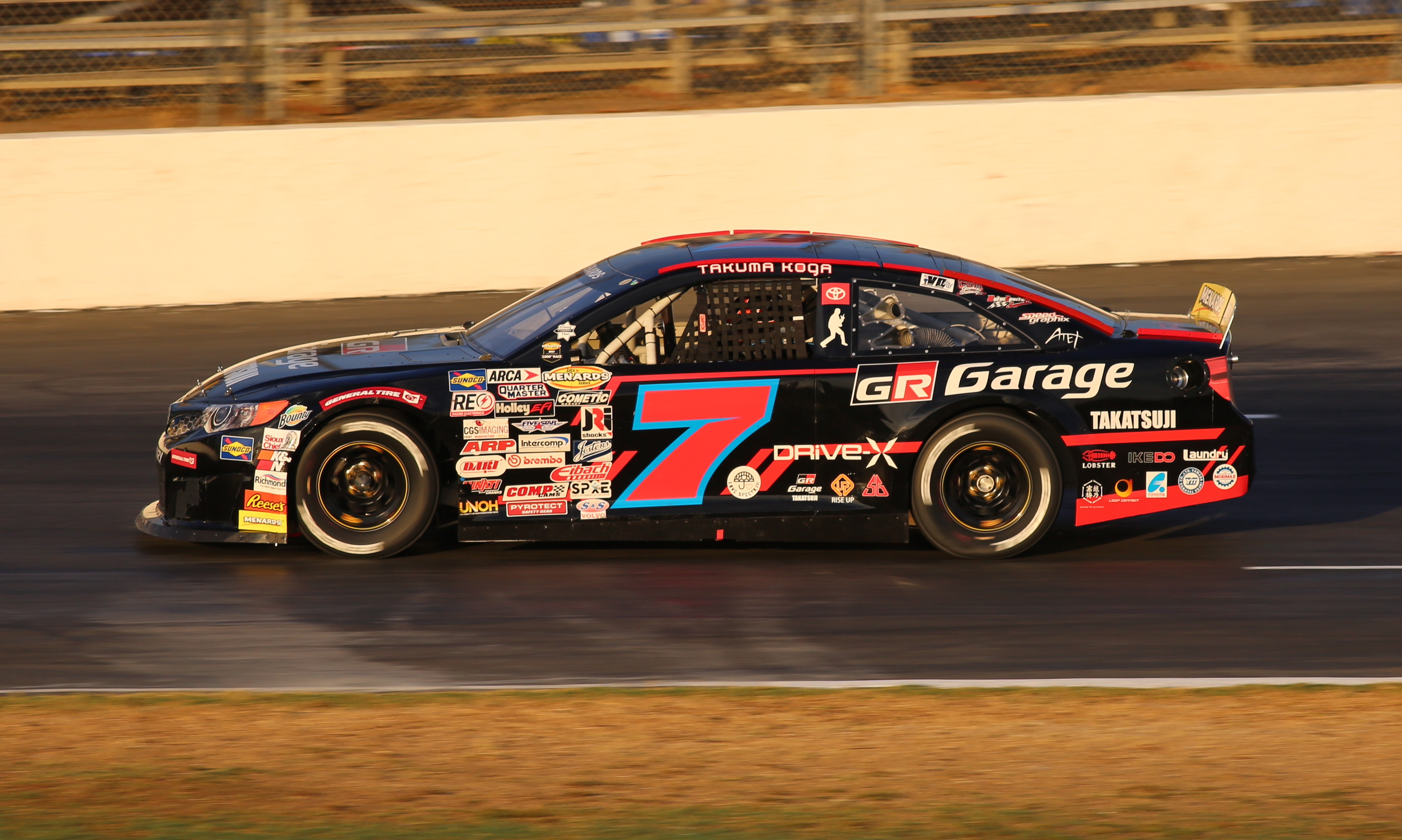
Koga's No. 7 car at Madera Speedway in 2023.

==== Takuma Koga (2021–present) ====
On January 20, 2021, it was announced that Japanese driver Takuma Koga would pilot the No. 7 car full-time for the upcoming season, as the team switched from running Fords to Toyotas. Koga started out the season with a 23rd-place finish at Phoenix. Throughout the season, he scored four top-ten finishes, with a fifth-place effort at Portland. He ended the season eighth in points. 2022 was an improvement for Koga, scoring five top-ten finishes with two top-fives, ironically both coming from Portland. During the October race at The Bullring, Koga made his 100th career West Series start. He ended with a career-best sixth in points. 2023 was an up-and-down year for Koga, scoring four top-tens and a ninth-place points finish.

==== Car No. 7 results ====
ARCA Menards Series West results
Year	Driver	No.	Make	1	2	3	4	5	6	7	8	9	10	11	12	13	AMSWC	Pts	Ref
2020	Austin Reed	7	Ford	LVS; 9													12th	313	
2020	Kris Wright	7	Ford		MMP; 2	MMP; 3											12th	313	
2020	Devin Dodson	7	Ford				IRW; 5	EVG	DCS	CNS				PHO; 16			12th	313	
2020	Kyle Keller	7	Ford								LVS; 4	AAS	KCR; 6				12th	313	
2021	Takuma Koga	7	Toyota	PHO; 23	SON; 11	IRW; 16	CNS; 15	IRW; 8	PIR; 5	LVS; 8	AAS; 9	PHO; 23					8th	378	
2022	Takuma Koga	7	Toyota	PHO; 18	IRW; 7	KCR; 9	PIR; 5	SON; 19	IRW; 18	EVG; 9	PIR; 5	AAS; 18	LVS; 21	PHO; 15			7th	490	
2023	Takuma Koga	7	Toyota	PHO; 19	IRW; 7	KCR; 11	PIR; 8	SON; 24	IRW; 10	SHA; 11	EVG; 12	AAS; 10	LVS; 19	MAD; 15	PHO; 16		10th	516	
2024	Takuma Koga	7	Toyota	PHO; 23	KER; 15	PIR; 10	SON; 13	IRW; 9	IRW; 13	SHA; 9	TRI; 11	MAD; 7	AAS; 12	KER; 15	PHO; 19		7th	472	
2025	Gavin Ray	7	Toyota	KER; 6	PHO	TUC	CNS	KER	SON	TRI	PIR	AAS	MAD	LVS	PHO		N/A	N/A	
2026	Gavin Ray	7	Toyota	KER; 9	PHO; 29	TUC; 5	SHA; 13	CNS; 9	TRI; 7			AAS; 13	MAD	LVS	PHO	KER	-*	-*	
2026	Gavin Ray	7	Ford							SON; 10	PIR; 10						-*	-*	

=== Car No. 70 history ===
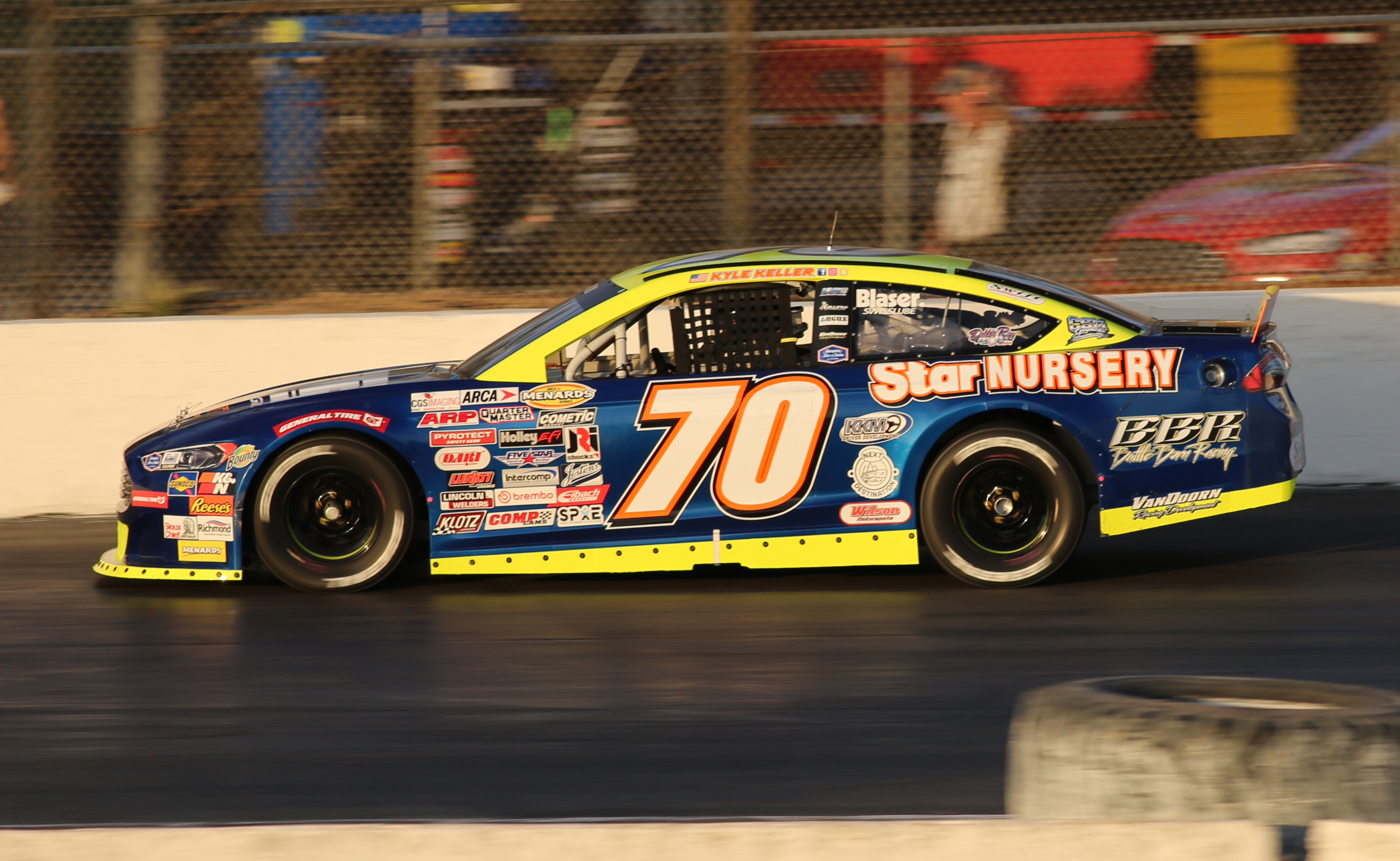
Keller's No. 70 car at Madera Speedway in 2023.

==== Kyle Keller (2023) ====
In 2023, Kyle Keller returned to JPR and ran a full season with the team in the No. 70 car. In the previous year, he ran for his own team in a partnership with JPR. Keller started out the season with a fifth-place finish at Phoenix. He earned six top-tens throughout the season and finished eighth in points. Keller left the team at the end of the season to join the newly formed Kennealy Keller Motorsports, a team which he co-owns with Robbie Kennealy.

ARCA Menards Series West results
Year	Team	No.	Make	1	2	3	4	5	6	7	8	9	10	11	12	AMSWC	Pts	Ref
2023	Kyle Keller	70	Toyota	PHO; 5	IRW; 6	KCR; 14										9th	548	
2023	Kyle Keller	70	Chevy				PIR; 20	SON; 13								9th	548	
2023	Kyle Keller	70	Ford						IRW; 15	SHA; 6	EVG; 7	AAS; 17	LVS; 6	MAD; 7	PHO; 14	9th	548	
