= Jason Jefferson (racing driver) =

American racing driver (born 1975)

Jason Jefferson (born August 21, 1975) is an American former stock car racing driver. Jefferson competed part-time in the 2004 NASCAR Busch Series, making one start at Phoenix Raceway. Jefferson also competed in the NASCAR Northwest Series, achieving five wins, and in the NASCAR K&N Pro Series West, achieving one win.
