= Eric Johnson Jr. =

American racing driver (born 2003)

- Johnson at Madera Speedway in 2026
- Born: February 17, 2003 (age 23); La Center, Washington, U.S.

ARCA Menards Series career
- 3 races run over 3 years
- Best finish: 100th (2026)
- First race: 2024 General Tire 150 (Phoenix)
- Last race: 2026 General Tire 150 (Phoenix)
Wins	Top tens	Poles
0	0	0

ARCA Menards Series West career
- 41 races run over 4 years
- Best finish: 4th (2025)
- First race: 2023 Portland 112 (Portland)
- Last race: 2026 NAPA Auto Parts 150 (Bakersfield)
Wins	Top tens	Poles
0	22	0
- Statistics up to date as of November 1, 2026.

Eric Johnson Jr. (born February 17, 2003) is an American professional stock car racing driver. He last competed full-time in the ARCA Menards Series West, and part-time in the ARCA Menards Series, driving the No. 5 Toyota Camry for Jerry Pitts Racing.

== Racing career ==
Johnson began his racing career in 2019 at the age of 16, competing at short tracks across the Pacific Northwest in various stock car divisions. After achieving early success, Johnson began preparing and maintaining his family-owned Late Model race cars in the Johnson family’s personal garage. He documented much of the process on his YouTube channel.

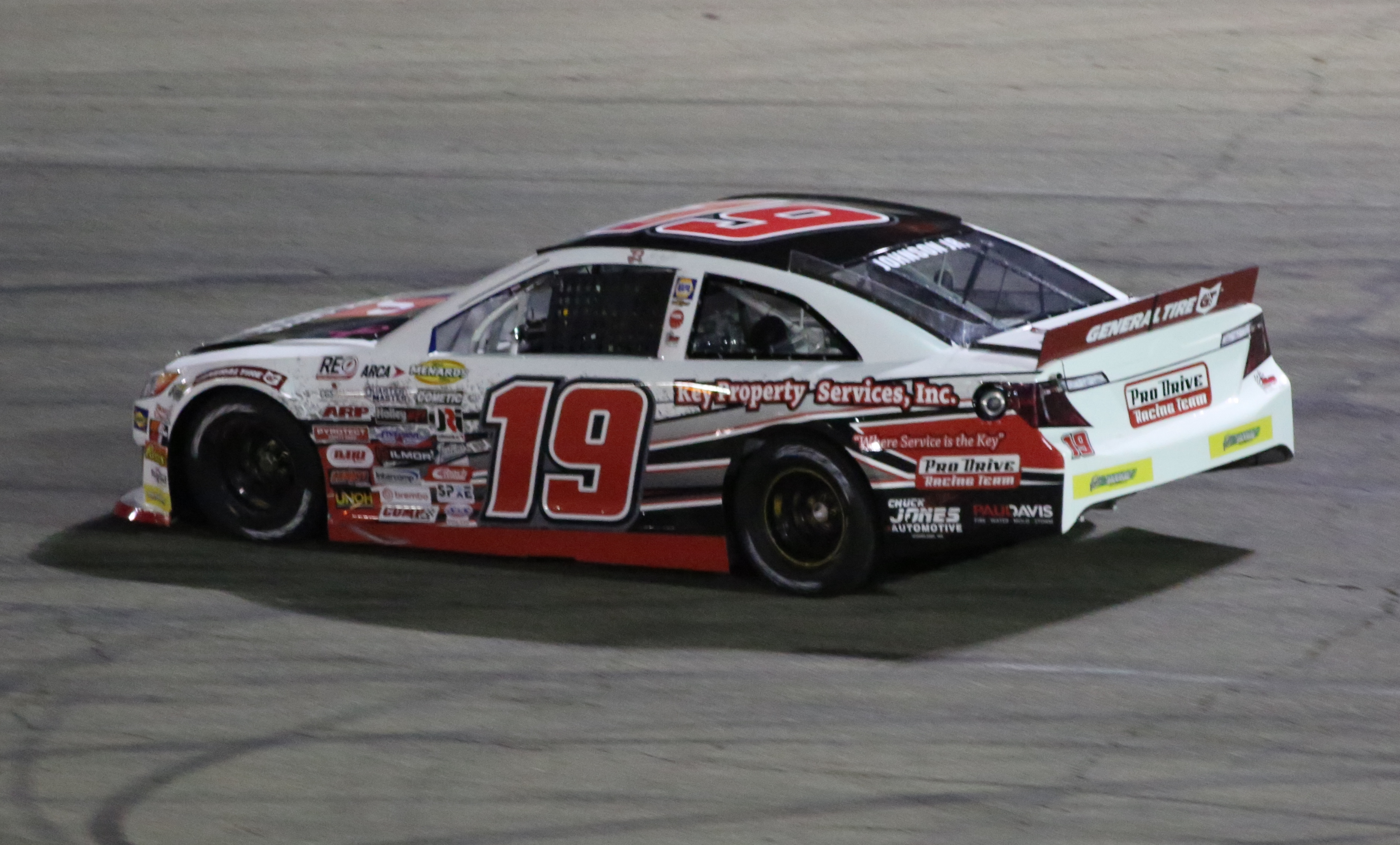
Johnson Jr's No. 19 ARCA car at All American Speedway in 2023

On December 30, 2022, it was announced that Johnson would run part-time in the ARCA Menards Series West, driving the No. 19 Chevrolet for Bill McAnally Racing, having previously being a crew member and spotter for drivers like Derek Kraus, Jesse Love, and Cole Moore. Uniquely compared to most professional drivers, he had prepared his own cars prior to his ARCA Series West races alongside his crew chief, Chuck Jones. In his next race at Sonoma Raceway, he would start eighteenth but would go on to finish 27th due to transmission issues halfway through the race. He would return at Evergreen Speedway, this time running in a Toyota, where he would start fourteenth and finish eleventh, and would run the next race at All American Speedway, where he would start eleventh and finish in ninth place.

In January 2024, it was announced that Johnson would compete full-time in the ARCA Menards Series West, driving the No. 19 for Bill McAnally Racing. He finished sixth in the championship standings and earned ARCA Menards Series West Rookie of the Year honors, the highest finishing position among rookies.

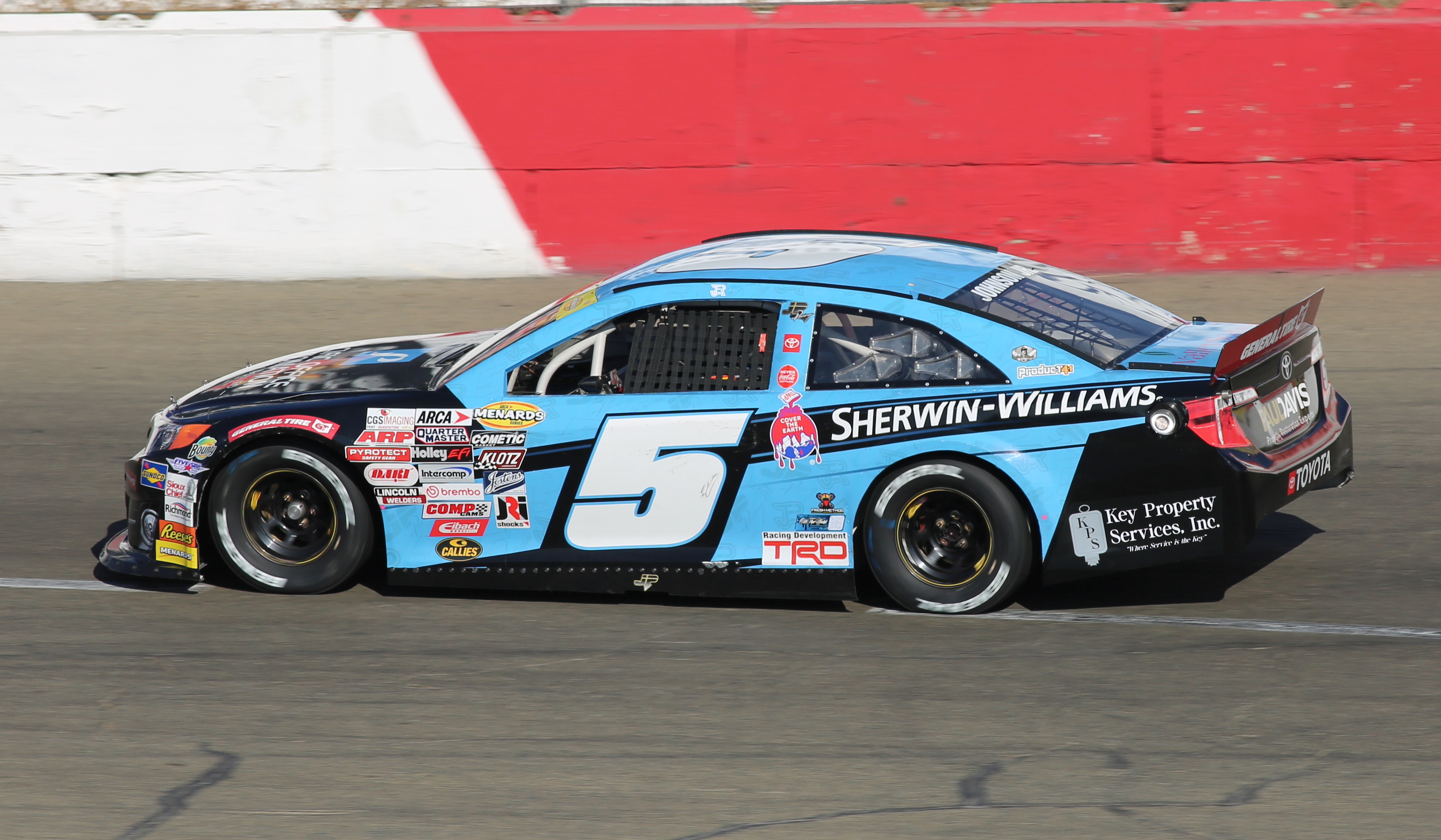
Johnson's No. 5 car at All American Speedway in 2025

In December 2024, Johnson signed with Jerry Pitts Racing to drive the No. 5 Toyota Camry full-time in the 2025 ARCA Menards Series West season. During the season, he recorded a career-best second-place finish at Tucson Speedway in a three-wide finish. Johnson finished fourth in the final drivers’ championship standings, recording nine top-ten finishes and six top-five finishes in 12 races.

In December 2025, it was announced that Johnson would return to Jerry Pitts Racing for the 2026 season. He finished sixth in the points standings after getting six top-tens with a best finish of third at Tucson and Sonoma.

On October 26, 2026, it was announced that Johnson will not return to JPR in 2027.

== Motorsports career results ==
=== Stock car career summary ===
Season	Series	Team	Races	Wins	Top 5	Top 10	Points	Position
2023	ARCA Menards Series West	Bill McAnally Racing	4	0	0	2	119	20th
2024	ARCA Menards Series West	Bill McAnally Racing	12	0	1	6	540	6th
2024	ARCA Menards Series	Bill McAnally Racing	1	0	0	0	24	101st
2025	ARCA Menards Series West	Jerry Pitts Racing	12	0	6	9	581	4th
2025	ARCA Menards Series	Jerry Pitts Racing	1	0	0	0	33	101st
2026	ARCA Menards Series West	Jerry Pitts Racing	13	0	3	6	592	6th
2026	ARCA Menards Series	Jerry Pitts Racing	1	0	0	0	31	100th

=== ARCA Menards Series ===
(key) (Bold – Pole position awarded by qualifying time. Italics – Pole position earned by points standings or practice time. * – Most laps led.)

ARCA Menards Series results
Year	Team	No.	Make	1	2	3	4	5	6	7	8	9	10	11	12	13	14	15	16	17	18	19	20	AMSC	Pts	Ref
2024	Bill McAnally Racing	19	Chevy	DAY	PHO; 20	TAL	DOV	KAN	CLT	IOW	MOH	BLN	IRP	SLM	ELK	MCH	ISF	MLW	DSF	GLN	BRI	KAN	TOL	101st	24	
2025	Jerry Pitts Racing	5	Toyota	DAY	PHO; 11	TAL	KAN	CLT	MCH	BLN	ELK	LRP	DOV	IRP	IOW	GLN	ISF	MAD	DSF	BRI	SLM	KAN	TOL	101st	33	
2026	Jerry Pitts Racing	5	Toyota	DAY	PHO; 13	KAN	TAL	GLN	TOL	MCH	POC	BER	ELK	CHI	LRP	IRP	IOW	ISF	MAD	DSF	SLM	BRI	KAN	100th	31	

==== ARCA Menards Series West ====
ARCA Menards Series West results
Year	Team	No.	Make	1	2	3	4	5	6	7	8	9	10	11	12	13	AMSWC	Pts	Ref
2023	Bill McAnally Racing	19	Chevy	PHO	IRW	KCR	PIR; 10	SON; 27	IRW	SHA							20th	119	
2023	Bill McAnally Racing	19	Toyota								EVG; 11	AAS; 9	LVS	MAD	PHO		20th	119	
2024	Bill McAnally Racing	19	Chevy	PHO; 20	KER; 10	PIR; 19	SON; 7	IRW; 11	IRW; 10	SHA; 12	TRI; 13	MAD; 4	AAS; 8	KER; 9	PHO; 15		6th	540	
2025	Jerry Pitts Racing	5	Toyota	KER; 5	PHO; 11	TUC; 2	CNS; 4	KER; 5	SON; 17	TRI; 7	PIR; 9	AAS; 5	MAD; 3	LVS; 10	PHO; 20		4th	581	
2026	Jerry Pitts Racing	5	Toyota	KER; 11	PHO; 13	TUC; 3	SHA; 6	CNS; 11	TRI; 13	SON; 3	PIR; 5	AAS; 7	MAD; 15	LVS; 8	PHO; 16	KER; 20	6th	592	
