= Pacific Office Automation =

US office supply company

- Industry: Office automation
- Founded: 1976
- Headquarters: Beaverton, Oregon, United States
- Products: Photocopiers; Computer software; VoIP phones; Information technology
- Brands: Ricoh; Hewlett-Packard; Konica Minolta; Sharp; Canon; Lexmark; Muratec; Kyocera; Océ; Panasonic; Pitney Bowes; Francotyp-Postalia
- Owner: Privately held company
- Number of employees: 1,000+
- Website: www.pacificoffice.com

Pacific Office Automation (also known as "POA" or "Pacific Office") is a privately held office technology company based in Beaverton, Oregon. POA is the largest office equipment dealer in the United States, with over 1,400 employees and offices in ten different states.

The company provides its customers with managed print services, enterprise level IT services, unified communications, software, and various types of office equipment. POA operates 25 locations in the states of Oregon, Washington, California, Arizona, New Mexico, Utah, Colorado, Hawaii, Idaho and Texas. The company is managed by CEO Adam Pritchett.

== History ==
Pacific Office Automation was founded in 1976 when Terry Newsom purchased APECO, a financially ailing photocopier company in Tigard, Oregon. Within two years, POA had opened offices in Seattle and Bellevue, Washington. In the 1990s, POA grew to become a prominent provider of facsimile and digital printing technology in the Pacific Northwest.

In 2013, POA expanded into Colorado with the acquisition of DOCUMation of the Rockies, Inc.

In 2016, POA acquired Northwest Office Technologies, adding Spokane, Washington and Post Falls, Idaho to the company's regional footprint.

In 2017, POA acquired Trans-West, a VoIP Phones and data solutions provider in Phoenix, Arizona.
