= NAPA Auto Care 150 =

Annual stock car race in Washington, US

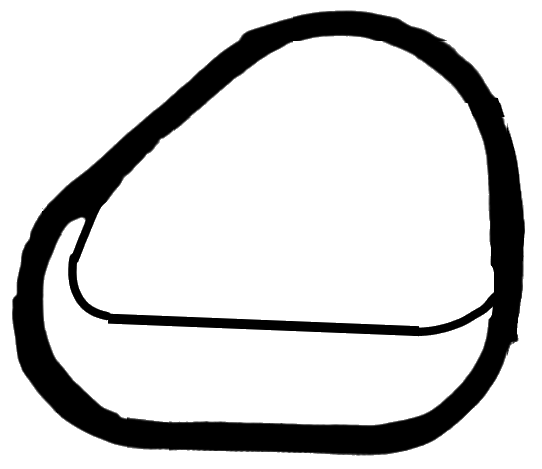

ARCA Menards Series West
- Venue: Tri-City Raceway
- Location: West Richland, Washington, United States
- Corporate sponsor: NAPA Auto Care
- First race: 1968
- Laps: 150
- Previous names: No name (1968–1970); Tri-City 150 (1972); Pontiac Excitement 200 (1989); Miller Genuine Draft 200 (1990); Winston 200 (1993–1994); NAPA 150 (2003); NAPA Auto Care 150 Greg Biffle Memorial (2026)
- Most wins (driver): Ray Elder, Roy Smith (2)
- Most wins (team): Elder Racing, Razore Racing, Jan's Towing Racing (2)
- Most wins (manufacturer): Ford (6)

Circuit information
- Surface: Asphalt
- Turns: 4

The NAPA Auto Care 150 (known as the NAPA Auto Care 150 Greg Biffle Memorial) is an ARCA Menards Series West stock car race held annually at Tri-City Raceway in West Richland, Washington. Cole Denton is the defending winner of the race.

== History ==
The West Series first visited Tri-City in 1968, when Ray Elder drove his 1967 Dodge to victory. The West Series visited Tri-City infrequently in the years that followed, with competitors like Jim Cook, Jack McCoy, Roy Smith, Dirk Stephens, Mike Chase and Jason Jefferson securing victories at the half-mile tri-oval.

In 2024, the race was added back for the first time since 2003 and NAPA Auto Care became the title sponsor of the race.

== Past winners ==
Year	Date	No.	Driver	Team	Manufacturer	Race Distance		Race Time	Average Speed (mph)	Report	Ref
Year	Date	No.	Driver	Team	Manufacturer	Laps	Miles (km)	Race Time	Average Speed (mph)	Report	Ref
1968	August 17	96	Ray Elder	Elder Racing	Dodge	100	50 (80.47)	0:44:52	66.865	Report	
1969	July 5	18	Jim Cook	Bob Bristol	Ford	100	50 (80.47)	0:43:30	68.695	Report	
1970	September 4	96	Ray Elder (2)	Elder Racing (2)	Dodge (2)	100	50 (80.47)	0:38:41	77.553	Report	
1971	Not held										
1972	May 26	7	Jack McCoy	Ernie Conn	Dodge (3)	150	75 (120.70)	0:55:00	81.818	Report	
1973 - 1988	Not held										
1989	July 8	79	Roy Smith	Razore Racing	Ford (2)	200	100 (160.93)	1:26:38	69.458	Report	
1990	September 30	79	Roy Smith (2)	Razore Racing (2)	Ford (3)	200	100 (160.93)	1:46:18	56.721	Report	
1991 - 1992	Not held										
1993	September 4	20	Dirk Stephens	Tom Craigen	Ford (4)	200	100 (160.93)	1:29:20	67.189	Report	
1994	September 3	50	Mike Chase	John Strauser	Chevrolet	200	100 (160.93)	1:31:49	65.348	Report	
1995 - 2002	Not held										
2003	June 21	97	Jason Jefferson	Samuel Roebuck	Pontiac	150	75 (120.70)	1:00:20	74.586	Report	
2004 - 2023	Not held										
2024	August 10	13	Tyler Reif	Central Coast Racing	Toyota	150	75 (120.70)	1:10:41	63.664	Report	
2025	August 9	71	Kyle Keller	Jan's Towing Racing	Ford (5)	150	75 (120.70)	1:09:33	64.702	Report	
2026	June 6	71	Cole Denton	Jan's Towing Racing (2)	Ford (6)	150	75 (120.70)			Report	

=== Manufacturer wins ===
# Wins	Make	Years won
6	(United States) Ford	1969, 1989–1990, 1993, 2025–2026
3	(United States) Dodge	1969, 1970, 1972
1	(United States) Chevrolet	1994
1	(United States) Pontiac	2003
1	(Japan) Toyota	2024

Previous race: Legendary Billy Green 150	ARCA Menards Series West; NAPA Auto Care 150	Next race: General Tire 150
