= West Series races at Portland =

ARCA Menards Series West races at Portland International Raceway

ARCA Menards Series West at Portland

ARCA Menards Series West
- Venue: Portland International Raceway
- Location: Portland, Oregon, United States

Circuit information
- Surface: Asphalt
- Length: 1.97 mi (3.17 km)
- Turns: 12

The ARCA Menards Series West has held several races at Portland International Raceway in Portland, Oregon over the years.

The layout without the chicane, they layout commonly run with the West Series

== Current race ==
Portland 112
- First race: 1986
- Distance: 112.86 mi (181.631 km)
- Laps: 57
- Previous names: Motorcraft 300 (1986); Bi-Mart Salute to the Troops 125 (2009-2011); NAPA Auto Parts Salute to the Troops 125 (2012)
- Most wins (driver): William Sawalich (2)
- Most wins (team): Sunrise Ford Racing, Joe Gibbs Racing (2)
- Most wins (manufacturer): Ford (4)

The Portland 112 is an ARCA Menards Series West race at Portland International Raceway in Portland, Oregon. The race is held on the same weekend as the NTT IndyCar Series' race at the track and was previously held on the same weekend as the NASCAR Xfinity Series' race at the track.

=== Past winners ===
Year	Date	No.	Driver	Team	Manufacturer	Race Distance		Race Time	Average Speed (mph)	Report	Ref
Year	Date	No.	Driver	Team	Manufacturer	Laps	Miles (km)	Race Time	Average Speed (mph)	Report	Ref
1986	August 24	04	Hershel McGriff	Gary Smith	Pontiac	95	185.250 (298.131)	2:15:25	82.08	Report	
1987 – 2008	Not held										
2009	July 19	1	Jim Inglebright	Roadrunner Motorsports	Chevrolet	66*	124.740 (200.750)	2:14:25	58.332	Report	
2010	May 12	45	Patrick Long	Speed Wong Racing	Dodge	65*	124.740 (200.750)	1:56:04	66.531	Report	
2011	July 24	6	Luis Martinez Jr.	Sunrise Ford Racing	Ford	68*	124.740 (200.750)	2:18:55	57.771	Report	
2012	August 26	26	Greg Pursley	Gene Price Motorsports	Ford (2)	63	124.740 (200.750)	1:53:59	65.231	Report	
2013 – 2020	Not held										
2021	September 10	17	Taylor Gray	David Gilliland Racing	Ford (3)	58*	98.350 (158.279)	1:54:21	59.861	Report	
2022	June 4	6	Jake Drew	Sunrise Ford Racing (2)	Ford (4)	42*	98.350 (158.279)	1:26:40	57.194	Report	
2023	June 2	17	Landen Lewis	McGowan Motorsports	Holden	57	112.86 (181.631)	1:47:13	62.743	Report	
2024	May 31	18	William Sawalich	Joe Gibbs Racing	Toyota	57	112.86 (181.631)	1:42:06	65.888	Report	
2025	August 29	18	William Sawalich (2)	Joe Gibbs Racing (2)	Toyota (2)	57	112.86 (181.631)	1:29:54	74.943	Report	
2026	August 8	19	Mason Massey	Bill McAnally Racing	Holden (2)	57	112.86 (181.631)	1:40:21	67.037	Report	

- 2009, 2010, 2011, 2021: Race extended due to a Green–white–checker finish.
- 2022: Race shortened due to rain.

== September race ==
ARCA Portland 112
- First race: 2022
- Last race: 2022
- Distance: 112 mi (180.247 km)
- Laps: 57
- Previous names: ARCA Portland 112 (2022)

The ARCA Portland 112 was an ARCA Menards Series West race at Portland International Raceway in Portland, Oregon. The race was held on the same weekend as the NTT IndyCar Series' race at the track.

=== Past winners ===
Year	Date	No.	Driver	Team	Manufacturer	Race Distance		Race Time	Average Speed (mph)	Report	Ref
Year	Date	No.	Driver	Team	Manufacturer	Laps	Miles (km)	Race Time	Average Speed (mph)	Report	Ref
2022	September 3	6	Jake Drew	Sunrise Ford Racing	Ford	57	112.86 (181.631)	1:35:32	70.417	Report	

Previous race: General Tire 150	ARCA Menards Series West; Portland 112	Next race: NAPA Auto Parts 150 presented by Berco Redwood
