= Dystany Spurlock =

American racing driver (born 1992)

- Spurlock in 2026
- Born: March 30, 1992 (age 34); Richmond, Virginia, U.S.

NASCAR FedEx Freight Truck Series career
- 2 races run over 1 year
- 2026 position: 89th
- Best finish: 89th (2026)
- First race: 2026 Ecosave 200 (Dover)
- Last race: 2026 Black's Tire 250 (Richmond)
Wins	Top tens	Poles
0	0	0

ARCA Menards Series career
- 5 races run over 1 year
- ARCA no., team: No. 44 (Alpha Prime Racing)
- Best finish: 38th (2026)
- First race: 2026 Tide 150 (Kansas)
- Last race: 2026 LiUNA! 150 (IRP)
Wins	Top tens	Poles
0	1	0

ARCA Menards Series East career
- 3 races run over 1 year
- Best finish: 23rd (2026)
- First race: 2026 Cook Out 200 (Hickory)
- Last race: 2026 LiUNA! 150 (IRP)
Wins	Top tens	Poles
0	1	0

ARCA Menards Series West career
- 1 race run over 1 year
- Best finish: 66th (2026)
- First race: 2026 Desert Diamond Casino West Valley 100 (Phoenix)
Wins	Top tens	Poles
0	0	0
- Statistics up to date as of November 6, 2026.

Dystany Spurlock (born March 30, 1992) (pronounced "destiny") is an American professional auto racing driver who competes in the NHRA Pro Stock Motorcycle class for Arana Racing, as well as part-time in the ARCA Menards Series, driving the No. 44 Ford/Toyota for Alpha Prime Racing.

== Racing career ==
=== Motorcycle drag racing ===
Spurlock began her career in motorcycle drag racing at the age of 17.

In 2024, Spurlock mostly competed in the XDA Motorcycle Drag Racing Series. On October 5, 2024, she set track, series, and world records in the Real Street class with a 7.32-second pass at 178 mph and became the first woman in history to win that class.

In partnership with Arana Racing, on June 20, 2025, Spurlock competed at the American Rebel Light Virginia NHRA Nationals, becoming the second black woman in history to compete in the NHRA Pro Stock Motorcycle class. She also competed in the U.S. Nationals that year.

=== Formula 4 ===
In 2023, Spurlock competed in Skip Barber's Formula 4 series, having graduated from the racing school. She finished 13th in the final points standings.

=== ARCA and NASCAR ===
Spurlock competing at Hickory Motor Speedway in 2026

In 2026, it was announced that Spurlock would make her debut in the ARCA Menards Series East at Hickory Motor Speedway, becoming the first black woman in history to compete in a NASCAR-sanctioned series. She will drive the No. 66 Chevrolet for MBM Motorsports. She plans on running in select races in the main ARCA Menards Series, and plans for additional races later in year. At Hickory, she finished on the lead lap in seventh place. It was later revealed that she would run the following race at Rockingham Speedway (where she finished 12th), as well as the main ARCA Menards Series race at Kansas Speedway (where she finished tenth).

On April 30, 2026, it was announced that Spurlock would attempt to make her debut in the NASCAR Craftsman Truck Series at Watkins Glen International, driving the No. 69 Toyota for MBM Motorsports, although she failed to qualify. Following this, it was later revealed that she would run at the following race at Dover Motor Speedway, this time in a Ford, where he finished in 36th after a crash early in the race. She later ran the Truck Series race at Richmond Raceway in the No. 2 Ford for Team Reaume, where she finished in 35th.

On October 28, 2026, it was announced that Spurlock will run a majority of the ARCA schedule with Alpha Prime Racing in the No. 44 Ford in 2027.

=== Other series ===
Spurlock has also competed in the Lexus 0-60 challenge and various indoor arena car circuits. She has also competed in the Paramount Kia Big 10 Challenge at Hickory Motor Speedway in preparation for her ARCA debut.

== Personal life ==
Spurlock was born in Richmond, Virginia, United States. Her interest in motorsports began when she was young, when her parents took her on motorcycle rides around their home. She also spent Sundays watching NASCAR races on television. At the age of 12, her godfather took her to her first drag racing event, which started her motorcycle racing career.

Spurlock played football in middle school and high school. She also worked for three years as a flight attendant for Delta Airlines and also worked as a truck driver.

Since July 2024, Spurlock has been a member of the Board of Directors of the African American Automotive Association (AAAA), an organization which advocates for diversity in the automotive industry.

== Motorsports career results ==
=== Stock car career summary ===
Season	Series	Team	Races	Wins	Top 5	Top 10	Points	Position
2026	ARCA Menards Series West	MBM Motorsports	1	0	0	0	30	66th
2026	ARCA Menards Series East	MBM Motorsports	3	0	0	1	100	23rd
2026	ARCA Menards Series	MBM Motorsports	5	0	0	1	131	38th
2026	NASCAR Craftsman Truck Series	MBM Motorsports	1	0	0	0	3	89th
2026	NASCAR Craftsman Truck Series	Team Reaume	1	0	0	0	3	89th

=== NASCAR ===
(key) (Bold – Pole position awarded by qualifying time. Italics – Pole position earned by points standings or practice time. * – Most laps led.)

==== Craftsman Truck Series ====
NASCAR Craftsman Truck Series results
Year	Team	No.	Make	1	2	3	4	5	6	7	8	9	10	11	12	13	14	15	16	17	18	19	20	21	22	23	24	25	NCTC	Pts	Ref
2026	MBM Motorsports	69	Toyota	DAY	ATL	STP	DAR	CAR	BRI	TEX	GLN; DNQ																		89th	3	
2026	MBM Motorsports	69	Ford									DOV; 36	CLT	NSH	MCH	COR	LRP	NWS	IRP										89th	3	
2026	Team Reaume	2	Ford																	RCH; 35	NHA	BRI	KAN	CLT	PHO	TAL	MAR	HOM	89th	3	

=== ARCA Menards Series ===
(key) (Bold – Pole position awarded by qualifying time. Italics – Pole position earned by points standings or practice time. * – Most laps led. ** – All laps led.)

ARCA Menards Series results
Year	Team	No.	Make	1	2	3	4	5	6	7	8	9	10	11	12	13	14	15	16	17	18	19	20	AMSC	Pts	Ref
2026	MBM Motorsports	66	Ford	DAY	PHO	KAN; 10	TAL	GLN; 29	TOL		POC; 24	BER	ELK	CHI	LRP									38th	131	
2026	MBM Motorsports	66	Chevy							MCH; 13														38th	131	
2026	MBM Motorsports	66	Toyota													IRP; 13	IOW	ISF	MAD	DSF	SLM	BRI	KAN	38th	131	

==== ARCA Menards Series East ====
ARCA Menards Series East results
Year	Team	No.	Make	1	2	3	4	5	6	7	8	AMSEC	Pts	Ref
2026	MBM Motorsports	66	Chevy	HCY; 7	CAR; 12	NSV	TOL					23rd	100	
2026	MBM Motorsports	66	Toyota					IRP; 13	FRS	IOW	BRI	23rd	100	

==== ARCA Menards Series West ====
ARCA Menards Series West results
Year	Team	No.	Make	1	2	3	4	5	6	7	8	9	10	11	12	13	AMSWC	Pts	Ref
2026	MBM Motorsports	66	Toyota	KER	PHO	TUC	SHA	CNS	TRI	SON	PIR	AAS	MAD	LVS	PHO; 14	KER	66th	30	
