= Cassten Everidge =

American racing driver (born 1996)

- Born: May 22, 1996 (age 30); Stroh, Indiana, U.S.

NASCAR FedEx Freight Truck Series career
- 1 race run over 1 year
- 2026 position: 84th
- Best finish: 84th (2026)
- First race: 2026 TSport 200 (IRP)
Wins	Top tens	Poles
0	0	0

ARCA Menards Series West career
- 1 race run over 1 year
- Best finish: 74th (2026)
- First race: 2026 Desert Diamond Casino West Valley 100 (Phoenix)
Wins	Top tens	Poles
0	0	0
- Statistics up to date as of November 6, 2026.

Cassten Everidge (born May 22, 1996) is an American professional stock car racing driver. He last competed part-time in the NASCAR Craftsman Truck Series, driving the No. 93 Chevrolet Silverado RST for Costner Motorsports, and part-time in the ARCA Menards Series West, driving the No. 51 Chevrolet for Strike Mamba Racing.

== Racing career ==
Everidge started his racing career at the age of 13, where he competed in mini-stocks at Angola Motorsports Park.

In 2013, Everidge made his debut in asphalt late models. That same year, he was crowned rookie of the year at Angola Motorsport Speedway. In just his second year of racing late models, he finished runner-up in the points. Over the next several years, he would compete in various late model series such as the ASA CRA Super Series, the ASA STARS National Tour, and the CRA Late Model Sportsman Series, where he won the championship in 2025.

=== NASCAR ===
==== Craftsman Truck Series ====
On April 26, 2026, it was revealed that Everidge would attempt to make his debut in the NASCAR Craftsman Truck Series at Lucas Oil Indianapolis Raceway Park, driving the No. 93 Chevrolet for Costner Motorsports.

== Personal life ==
Everidge's father, Rick, is a third generation racing driver, while his grandfather, Ron, formerly owned a user car dealership in Angola, Indiana.

== Motorsports career results ==
=== Stock car career summary ===
Season	Series	Team	Races	Wins	Top 5	Top 10	Points	Position
2023	ASA STARS National Tour	Cassten Everidge Racing	1	0	0	0	34	82nd
2026	ARCA Menards Series West	Strike Mamba Racing	1	0	0	0	25	74th
2026	NASCAR Craftsman Truck Series	Costner Motorsports	1	0	0	0	5	84th

=== NASCAR ===
(key) (Bold – Pole position awarded by qualifying time. Italics – Pole position earned by points standings or practice time. * – Most laps led.)

==== Craftsman Truck Series ====
NASCAR Craftsman Truck Series results
Year	Team	No.	Make	1	2	3	4	5	6	7	8	9	10	11	12	13	14	15	16	17	18	19	20	21	22	23	24	25	NCTC	Pts	Ref
2026	Costner Motorsports	93	Chevy	DAY	ATL	STP	DAR	ROC	BRI	TEX	GLN	DOV	CLT	NSH	MCH	COR	LRP	NWS	IRP; 32	RCH	NHA	BRI	KAN	CLT	PHO	TAL	MAR	HOM	84th	5	

^{*} Season still in progress
^{1} Ineligible for series points

=== ARCA Menards Series West ===
(key) (Bold – Pole position awarded by qualifying time. Italics – Pole position earned by points standings or practice time. * – Most laps led. ** – All laps led.)

ARCA Menards Series West results
Year	Team	No.	Make	1	2	3	4	5	6	7	8	9	10	11	12	13	AMSWC	Pts	Ref
2026	Strike Mamba Racing	51	Chevy	KER	PHO	TUC	SHA	CNS	TRI	SON	PIR	AAS	MAD	LVS	PHO; 19	KER	74th	25	

=== ASA STARS National Tour ===
(key) (Bold – Pole position awarded by qualifying time. Italics – Pole position earned by points standings or practice time. * – Most laps led. ** – All laps led.)

ASA STARS National Tour results
Year	Team	No.	Make	1	2	3	4	5	6	7	8	9	10	ASNTC	Pts	Ref
2023	Cassten Everidge Racing	63	Chevy	FIF	MAD	NWS	HCY	MLW	AND; 18	WIR	TOL	WIN	NSV	82nd	34	
