= Tanner Huddleston =

American racing driver (born 2003)

- Huddleston's No. 56 Late Model at the Las Vegas Motor Speedway Bullring in 2026
- Born: August 20, 2003 (age 23); Somis, California, U.S.

ARCA Menards Series West career
- 1 race run over 1 year
- Best finish: 57th (2026)
- First race: 2026 NAPA Auto Parts 150 (Bakersfield)
Wins	Top tens	Poles
0	1	0
- Statistics up to date as of November 2, 2026.

Tanner Huddleston (born August 20, 2003) is an American professional stock car racing driver. He last competed part-time in the ARCA Menards Series West, driving the No. 55 Ford for High Point Racing.

== Racing career ==
Huddleston has previously competed in the CARS Tour West Limited Pro Late Model Series, the SRL SPEARS Pro Late Model Series, and the NASCAR Local Racing Series.

=== ARCA Menards Series West ===
In 2026, it was revealed that Huddleston would make his debut in the ARCA Menards Series West at Kevin Harvick's Kern Raceway, driving the No. 55 Ford for High Point Racing, replacing Andrew Chapman. He ran ninth in practice and qualified 13th. He finished eighth at the race-shortened event.

== Personal life ==
Huddleston is the younger brother of two-time ARCA Menards Series West champion Trevor Huddleston.

== Motorsports career results ==
=== ARCA Menards Series West ===
(key) (Bold – Pole position awarded by qualifying time. Italics – Pole position earned by points standings or practice time. * – Most laps led. ** – All laps led.)

ARCA Menards Series West results
Year	Team	No.	Make	1	2	3	4	5	6	7	8	9	10	11	12	13	AMSWC	Pts	Ref
2026	High Point Racing	55	Ford	KER	PHO	TUC	SHA	CNS	TRI	SON	PIR	AAS	MAD	LVS	PHO	KER; 8	57th	36	
