= Taylor Mayhew =

American racing driver (born 2010)

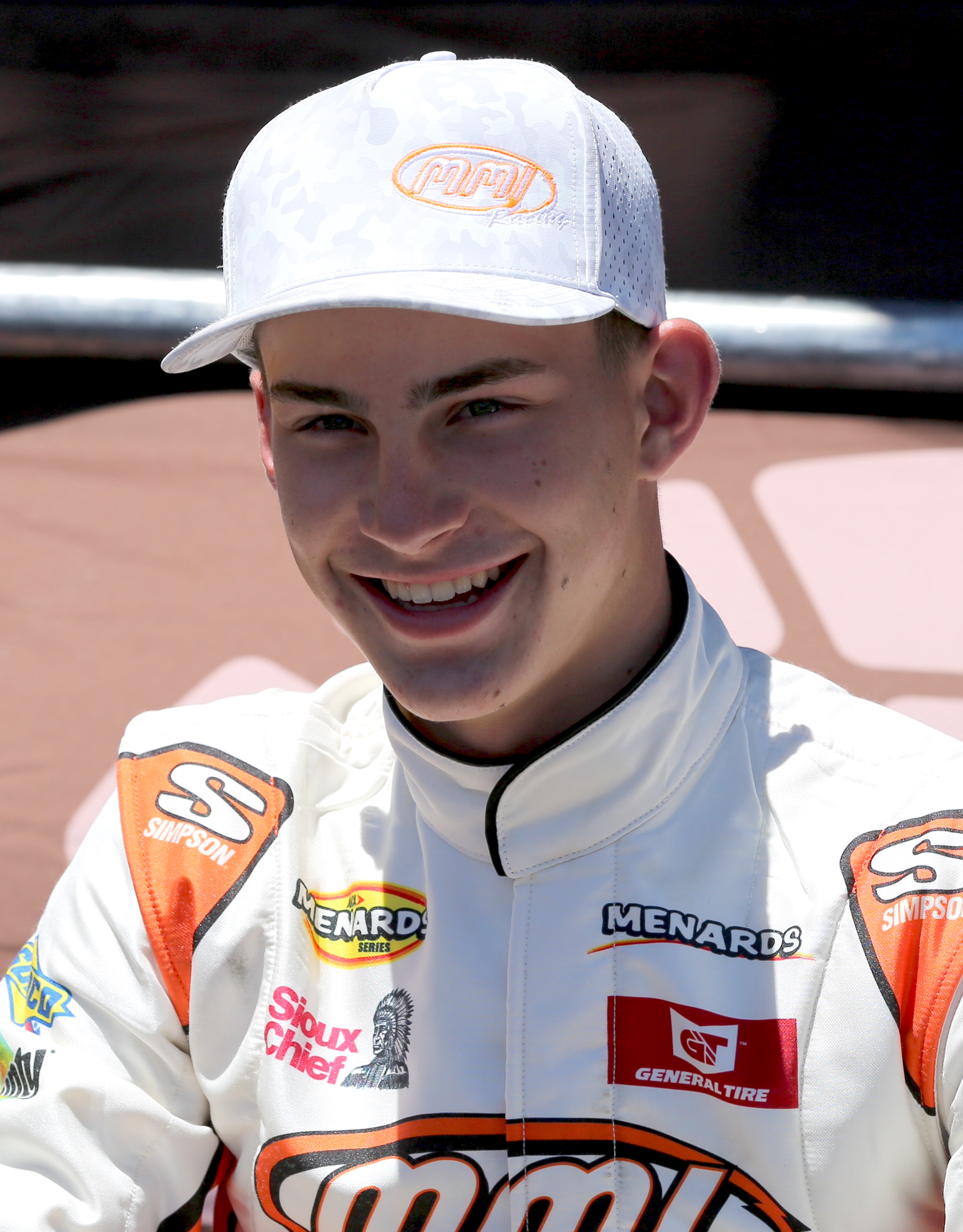
- Mayhew at Sonoma Raceway in 2026
- Born: November 5, 2010 (age 16); Atascadero, California, U.S.

ARCA Menards Series career
- 4 races run over 1 year
- Best finish: 39th (2026)
- First race: 2026 General Tire 150 (Phoenix)
- Last race: 2026 Bush's Best 200 (Bristol)
| Wins | Top tens | Poles |
|---|---|---|
| 0 | 2 | 0 |

ARCA Menards Series East career
- 1 race run over 1 year
- Best finish: 54th (2026)
- First race: 2026 Bush's Best 200 (Bristol)
| Wins | Top tens | Poles |
|---|---|---|
| 0 | 1 | 0 |

ARCA Menards Series West career
- 6 races run over 1 year
- Best finish: 12th (2026)
- First race: 2026 Oil Workers 150 presented by the West Coast Stock Car Motorsports Hall of Fame (Bakersfield)
- Last race: 2026 NAPA Auto Parts 150 (Bakersfield)
- First win: 2026 Kyle Busch Classic (LVMS Bullring)
| Wins | Top tens | Poles |
|---|---|---|
| 1 | 4 | 0 |
- Statistics up to date as of November 2, 2026.

Taylor Mayhew (born November 5, 2010) is an American professional stock car racing driver. He last competed part-time in the ARCA Menards Series West, driving the No. 17 Toyota for Cook Racing Technologies.

== Racing career ==
Mayhew has previously competed in series such as the CARS Pro Late Model Tour, the CARS Tour West, the Legends Tour West Series, the CRA JEGS All-Stars Tour, and the Silver State Road Course Series.

=== ARCA Menards Series ===
Mayhew first competed in the ARCA Menards Series at the combination race at Phoenix in 2026, where he finished in eighth. He then made three more starts in the main ARCA Series at Madison, Salem, and getting a top-ten finish at Bristol.

=== ARCA Menards Series West ===
Mayhew's No. 17 car at Sonoma Raceway in 2026.

In 2026, it was revealed that Mayhew would make his debut in the ARCA Menards Series West at Kevin Harvick's Kern Raceway, driving the No. 17 Toyota for Cook Racing Technologies. He finished in third. He then competed at the combination race at Phoenix Raceway, where he finished in eighth, and the standalone West Series race at Sonoma Raceway, where he finished in 12th. At his next West Series race at The Bullring at Las Vegas Motor Speedway, he started in 23rd but went on to win the race in a photo finish with Robbie Kennealy during overtime.

== Personal life ==
Mayhew is the son of former NASCAR driver David Mayhew.

== Motorsports career results ==
=== Stock car career summary ===
| Season | Series | Team | Races | Wins | Top 5 | Top 10 | Points | Position |
|---|---|---|---|---|---|---|---|---|
| 2025 | CARS Pro Late Model Tour | MMI Racing | 1 | 0 | 0 | 0 | 20 | 77th |
| 2026 | ARCA Menards Series West | Cook Racing Technologies | 6 | 1 | 3 | 4 | 277 | 12th |
| 2026 | ARCA Menards Series East | Cook Racing Technologies | 1 | 0 | 0 | 1 | 34 | 54th |
| 2026 | ARCA Menards Series | Cook Racing Technologies | 4 | 0 | 0 | 2 | 124 | 39th |

=== ARCA Menards Series ===
(key) (Bold – Pole position awarded by qualifying time. Italics – Pole position earned by points standings or practice time. * – Most laps led. ** – All laps led.)

ARCA Menards Series results
| Year | Team | No. | Make | 1 | 2 | 3 | 4 | 5 | 6 | 7 | 8 | 9 | 10 | 11 | 12 | 13 | 14 | 15 | 16 | 17 | 18 | 19 | 20 | AMSC | Pts | Ref |
|---|---|---|---|---|---|---|---|---|---|---|---|---|---|---|---|---|---|---|---|---|---|---|---|---|---|---|
| 2026 | Cook Racing Technologies | 17 | Toyota | DAY | PHO; 8 | KAN | TAL | GLN | TOL | MCH | POC | BER | ELK | CHI | LRP | IRP | IOW | ISF | | | | | | 39th | 124 | |
| 2026 | Cook Racing Technologies | 42 | Chevy | | | | | | | | | | | | | | | | MAD; 16 | DSF | SLM; 18 | BRI; 10 | KAN | 39th | 124 | |

==== ARCA Menards Series East ====
ARCA Menards Series East results
| Year | Team | No. | Make | 1 | 2 | 3 | 4 | 5 | 6 | 7 | 8 | AMSEC | Pts | Ref |
|---|---|---|---|---|---|---|---|---|---|---|---|---|---|---|
| 2026 | Cook Racing Technologies | 42 | Chevy | HCY | CAR | NSV | TOL | IRP | FRS | IOW | BRI; 10 | 54th | 34 | |

==== ARCA Menards Series West ====
ARCA Menards Series West results
| Year | Team | No. | Make | 1 | 2 | 3 | 4 | 5 | 6 | 7 | 8 | 9 | 10 | 11 | 12 | 13 | AMSWC | Pts | Ref |
|---|---|---|---|---|---|---|---|---|---|---|---|---|---|---|---|---|---|---|---|
| 2026 | Cook Racing Technologies | 17 | Toyota | KER; 3 | PHO; 8 | TUC | SHA | CNS | TRI | | | | | | | | 12th | 277 | |
| 2026 | Cook Racing Technologies | 17 | Chevy | | | | | | | SON; 12 | PIR | AAS | MAD | LVS; 1 | PHO; 13 | KER; 4 | 12th | 277 | |

=== CARS Pro Late Model Tour ===
(key)

CARS Pro Late Model Tour results
| Year | Team | No. | Make | 1 | 2 | 3 | 4 | 5 | 6 | 7 | 8 | 9 | 10 | 11 | 12 | 13 | CPLMTC | Pts | Ref |
|---|---|---|---|---|---|---|---|---|---|---|---|---|---|---|---|---|---|---|---|
| 2025 | MMI Racing | 17M | N/A | AAS | CDL | OCS | ACE | NWS | CRW | HCY | HCY | AND | FLC | SBO | TCM | NWS; 22 | 77th | 20 | |
