= Ethan Tovo =

American racing driver (born 2010)

- Born: July 19, 2010 (age 16); Cornelius, North Carolina, U.S.

ARCA Menards Series West career
- 1 race run over 1 year
- Best finish: 46th (2026)
- First race: 2026 Portland 112 (Portland)
Wins	Top tens	Poles
0	1	1
- Statistics up to date as of November 2, 2026.

Ethan Tovo (born July 19, 2010) is an American professional stock car racing driver. He last competed part-time in the ARCA Menards Series West, driving the No. 70 Toyota for Nitro Motorsports.

== Racing career ==
Tovo competes in series for Nitro Motorsports such as karting and the Trans-Am Series.

In 2026, it was revealed that Tovo would make his debut in the ARCA Menards Series West at Portland International Raceway, driving the No. 70 Toyota for Nitro Motorsports. He ran second in practice and qualified on pole.

== Personal life ==
Tovo's father, Joe Tovo, co-owns Nitro Motorsports with Nick Tucker. He also has a brother, Jackson, who also competes in racing.

== Motorsports career results ==
=== ARCA Menards Series West ===
(key) (Bold – Pole position awarded by qualifying time. Italics – Pole position earned by points standings or practice time. * – Most laps led. ** – All laps led.)

ARCA Menards Series West results
Year	Team	No.	Make	1	2	3	4	5	6	7	8	9	10	11	12	13	AMSWC	Pts	Ref
2026	Nitro Motorsports	70	Toyota	KER	PHO	TUC	SHA	CNS	TRI	SON	**PIR**; 4	AAS	MAD	LVS	PHO	KER	46th	42	
