= Ian Wood (racing driver) =

American racing driver (born 2008)

- Wood at Madera Speedway in 2026
- Born: April 5, 2008 (age 18); Eagle, Idaho, U.S.

ARCA Menards Series West career
- 6 races run over 1 year
- Best finish: 14th (2026)
- First race: 2026 Portland 112 (Portland)
- Last race: 2026 NAPA Auto Parts 150 (Bakersfield)
Wins	Top tens	Poles
0	0	0
- Statistics up to date as of November 2, 2026.

Ian Wood (born April 5, 2008) is an American professional stock car racing driver. He last competed part-time in the ARCA Menards Series West, driving the No. 04 Chevrolet/Ford for Kart Idaho Racing.

== Racing career ==
Wood started racing in go-karts, where he won the Kart Idaho JR2 LO206 Track championship.

Wood's No. 04 car at the Las Vegas Motor Speedway Bullring in 2026

In 2026, it was revealed that Wood would make his debut in the ARCA Menards Series West at Portland International Raceway, driving the No. 04 Ford for Kart Idaho Racing. After placing 20th in practice, he went on to qualify in 23rd and finish four laps down in 18th. He went on to make several more starts that year, getting a best finish of 12th at All American Speedway, this despite suffering a spin late in the race.

== Personal life ==
Wood is the son of fellow racing driver John Wood, who has previously competed in the West Series.

== Motorsports career results ==
=== Stock car career summary ===
Season	Series	Team	Races	Wins	Top 5	Top 10	Points	Position
2026	ARCA Menards Series West	Kart Idaho Racing	6	0	0	0	216	14th

=== ARCA Menards Series West ===
(key) (Bold – Pole position awarded by qualifying time. Italics – Pole position earned by points standings or practice time. * – Most laps led. ** – All laps led.)

ARCA Menards Series West results
Year	Team	No.	Make	1	2	3	4	5	6	7	8	9	10	11	12	13	AMSWC	Pts	Ref
2026	Kart Idaho Racing	04	Ford	KER	PHO	TUC	SHA	CNS	TRI	SON	PIR; 18						14th	216	
2026	Kart Idaho Racing	04	Chevy									AAS; 12	MAD; 16	LVS; 15		KER; 16	14th	216	
2026	Kart Idaho Racing	04	Toyota												PHO; 20		14th	216	
