= Josiah Reaume =

Canadian racing driver (born 2001)

- Reaume at Madera Speedway in 2026
- Born: Josiah Benjamin Reaume; April 21, 2001 (age 25); Jos, Plateau State, Nigeria
- Height: 5 ft 10 in (1.78 m)
- Weight: 195 lb (88 kg)

ARCA Menards Series West career
- 6 races run over 1 year
- Best finish: 16th (2026)
- First race: 2026 Bill Schmitt Memorial 173 (Shasta)
- Last race: 2026 NAPA Auto Parts 150 (Bakersfield)
Wins	Top tens	Poles
0	2	0
- Statistics up to date as of November 2, 2026.

Josiah Benjamin Reaume (born April 21, 2001) is a Nigerian-Canadian professional stock car racing driver and former amateur football player. He last competed part-time in the ARCA Menards Series West, driving the No. 72 Chevrolet for Strike Mamba Racing, and the No. 08 Ford for Kart Idaho Racing.

== Early life ==
Reaume was born in Jos, Nigeria in 2001. Reaume is the adopted younger brother of Jonathan and Josh Reaume, who were both heavily involved in racing before his birth. The family moved from Nigeria to Highlands, British Columbia in 2006.

Reaume attended Belmont Secondary School where he graduated in 2020. Reaume played small forward for the school's basketball team.

== Football career ==
Reaume joined the Westshore Rebels of the Canadian Junior Football League as a linebacker in 2021, playing three seasons and earning the most improved player award.

In his fourth year of U Sports eligibility, Reaume was recruited by the York University football team. He played in 11 games as a reserve linebacker and special teamer, recording 13 combined tackles, a tackle for a loss and a forced fumble. Reaume studied International Development Studies at York.

== Racing career ==
Reaume began racing karts at the age of three in Nigeria, and continued in Langford, British Columbia at Western Speedway. He has previously raced mini-stocks and late models across British Columbia.

Reaume's No. 72 car at All American Speedway in 2026

Reaume made his first start in the ARCA Menards Series West at Shasta Speedway in 2026. Contact with the wall in turn 2 ended his night on lap 18. Reaume achieved his first top-ten finish in his second race at Tri-City Raceway.

== Football career statistics ==
Year	Team	Games		Tackles						Interceptions						Fumbles	
Year	Team	GP	GS	Cmb	Solo	Ast	Sck	TfL	Sfty	PD	Int	Yds	Avg	Lng	TD	FF	FR
2024	YU	5	0	4	1	3	0.0	0	0	0	0	0	0	0	0	0	0
2025	YU	6	0	9	7	2	0.0	1	0	0	0	0	0	0	0	1	0
Career		11	0	13	8	5	0.0	1	0	0	0	0	0	0	0	1	0

== Motorsports career results ==
=== Stock car career summary ===
Season	Series	Team	Races	Wins	Top 5	Top 10	Points	Position
2026	ARCA Menards Series West	Strike Mamba Racing	6	0	0	2	164	16th

=== ARCA Menards Series West ===
(key) (Bold – Pole position awarded by qualifying time. Italics – Pole position earned by points standings or practice time. * – Most laps led. ** – All laps led.)

ARCA Menards Series West results
Year	Team	No.	Make	1	2	3	4	5	6	7	8	9	10	11	12	13	AMSWC	Pts	Ref
2026	Strike Mamba Racing	72	Chevy	KER	PHO	TUC	SHA; 16	CNS	TRI; 10	SON	PIR; 26	AAS; 9	MAD; 17	LVS	PHO		16th	164	
2026	Kart Idaho Racing	08	Ford													KER; 22	16th	164	

^{*} Season still in progress.
