= 2026 General Tire 150 =

2026 General Tire 150 may refer to two ARCA Menards Series races in 2026:

- 2026 General Tire 150 (Phoenix), at Phoenix Raceway on March 5
- 2026 General Tire 150 (Sonoma), at Sonoma Raceway on June 26
