= 2026 ARCA Menards Series West =

73rd season of the ARCA Menards Series West

Trevor Huddleston, the 2026 ARCA Menards Series West champion.

The 2026 ARCA Menards Series West was the 73rd season of the ARCA Menards Series West, which is a regional stock car racing series that is sanctioned by NASCAR in the United States. The season began on February 28 at Kevin Harvick's Kern Raceway with the Oil Workers 150 presented by the West Coast Stock Car Motorsports Hall of Fame and ended with the NAPA Auto Parts 150 presented by the West Coast Stock Car Motorsports Hall of Fame at the same track on October 31.

Trevor Huddleston entered the season as the defending champion. Huddleston of High Point Racing clinched his second consecutive ARCA Menards Series West championship by virtue of starting the race at Kern.

== Teams and drivers ==
Note: If a driver is listed as their own crew chief for a particular race, that means that their entry in that race was a start and park.

=== Complete schedule ===
Manufacturer	Team	No.	Driver	Crew chief	Ref
Chevrolet	Bill McAnally Racing	16	Hailie Deegan	Mario Isola	
Chevrolet	Bill McAnally Racing	19	Mason Massey	Ty Joiner	
Chevrolet	Strike Mamba Racing	51	Austin Varco 2	John Reaume	
Chevrolet	Strike Mamba Racing	51	Tyler Tomassi 8	John Reaume	
Chevrolet	Strike Mamba Racing	51	Scotty Milan 2	John Reaume	
Chevrolet	Strike Mamba Racing	51	Cassten Everidge 1	John Reaume	
Chevrolet	Strike Mamba Racing	72	Cody Dennison 4	Al Lebert 10; Jonathan Reaume 3	
Chevrolet	Strike Mamba Racing	72	Memphis Villarreal 1	Al Lebert 10; Jonathan Reaume 3	
Chevrolet	Strike Mamba Racing	72	Josiah Reaume 5	Al Lebert 10; Jonathan Reaume 3	
Chevrolet	Strike Mamba Racing	72	Tyler Tomassi 2	Al Lebert 10; Jonathan Reaume 3	
Chevrolet	Strike Mamba Racing	72	Sage Karam 1	Al Lebert 10; Jonathan Reaume 3	
Ford	High Point Racing	50	Trevor Huddleston	Jeff Schrader	
Ford	High Point Racing	55	Andrew Chapman (R) 12	Travis Thirkettle 12; Ryan Partridge 1	
Ford	High Point Racing	55	Tanner Huddleston 1	Travis Thirkettle 12; Ryan Partridge 1	
Ford	Jan's Towing Racing with Kennealy Keller Motorsports	1	Robbie Kennealy	Brian Kizer	
Ford	Jan's Towing Racing with Kennealy Keller Motorsports	71	Cole Denton (R)	Chris Greaney	
Toyota	Jerry Pitts Racing	5	Eric Johnson Jr.	Dustin Ash	
Toyota	Nitro Motorsports	15	Mia Lovell (R)	Ryan London 9 Doug Richert 1 Glenn Parker 1 Shannon Rursch 2	
Toyota	Nitro Motorsports	25	Julian DaCosta (R) 4	Danny Johnson 5 Jeff Spraker 4 Doug Richert 3 Shane Wilson 1	
Toyota	Nitro Motorsports	25	Will Robinson 3	Danny Johnson 5 Jeff Spraker 4 Doug Richert 3 Shane Wilson 1	
Toyota	Nitro Motorsports	25	Sam Corry 5	Danny Johnson 5 Jeff Spraker 4 Doug Richert 3 Shane Wilson 1	
Toyota	Nitro Motorsports	25	Gavan Boschele 1	Danny Johnson 5 Jeff Spraker 4 Doug Richert 3 Shane Wilson 1	
Toyota	Shockwave Motorsports	05	David Smith	Brandon Carlson	
Toyota 11 Ford 2	Jerry Pitts Racing	7	Gavin Ray (R)	R. J. Johnson 9 Jerry Pitts 1 Rod Johnson 3	

=== Limited schedule ===
Manufacturer	Team	No.	Driver	Crew chief	Races	Ref
Chevrolet	1/4 Ley Racing	32	Alex Quarterley	Unknown	1	
Chevrolet	66 Rhead Racing	66	Eric Rhead	Chris Bray 4 Will Harris 1	4	
Chevrolet	66 Rhead Racing	66	Cade Fox	Chris Bray 4 Will Harris 1	1	
Chevrolet	ACR Motorsports	79	Isaac Kitzmiller	Doug Howe	1	
Chevrolet	Anton Racing	44	Jeff Anton	Greg Ely 1 Aiden Quarterley 1	2	
Chevrolet	Bill McAnally Racing	20	Patrick Staropoli	Dewey Townsend	1	
Chevrolet	Bill McAnally Racing	20	Vito Cancilla	Dewey Townsend	2	
Chevrolet	Cook Racing Technologies	42	Jaiden Reyna	Travis Sharpe	2	
Chevrolet	CR7 Motorsports	97	Jason Kitzmiller	Frank Kimmel	1	
Chevrolet	Fierce Creature Racing	27	Bobby Hillis Jr. (Note: Entry at Phoenix was a Fierce Creature Racing entry using Wayne Peterson Racing's owner points.)	Tony Huffman 2 Ed Ash 2	4	
Chevrolet	Jet Daddy Racing	00	Toby Blanton	John Kennedy	1	
Chevrolet	KLAS Motorsports	71	Andy Jankowiak	Mike Dayton	1	
Chevrolet	Maples Motorsports	1	Tony Cosentino	Kenna Long	1	
Chevrolet	Maples Motorsports	19	Zachary Tinkle	Nigel Bannister	1	
Chevrolet	Maples Motorsports	99	Michael Maples	Chris Vanscoy	1	
Chevrolet	Nascimento Motorsports	21	Ethan Nascimento	Eric Nascimento Sr.	1	
Chevrolet	NDS Motorsports	53	Kyle Steckly	Ben Torriere	1	
Chevrolet	Pinnacle Racing Group	28	Carson Brown	Steven Dawson 2 Garrett Braden 1	1	
Chevrolet	Pinnacle Racing Group	28	Helio Meza	Steven Dawson 2 Garrett Braden 1	2	
Chevrolet	Pinnacle Racing Group	77	Tristan McKee	Kevin Reed Jr.	1	
Chevrolet	Pinnacle Racing Group	82	Taylor Reimer	Kevin Reed Jr.	1	
Chevrolet	Rise Racing	31	T. J. Curran	Loki Goulet	1	
Chevrolet	Rise Racing with Earnhardt-Shearer Racing	89	Bobby Dale Earnhardt	Matthew Wright	1	
Chevrolet	Spraker Racing Enterprises	63	Sam Corry	Jeff Spraker	1	
Chevrolet	Spurgeon Motorsports	86	Tim Spurgeon	Mike David	1	
Ford	Brad Smith Motorsports	48	Brad Smith	Rand Bitter	1	
Ford	Clubb Racing Inc.	03	Alex Clubb	Brian Clubb	1	
Ford	Clubb Racing Inc.	86	Jeff Maconi	Jonathan Clubb	1	
Ford	Fast Track Racing	9	Nate Moeller	Nate Moeller	1	
Ford	Fast Track Racing	10	Brad Perez	Mike Sroufe	1	
Ford	Jan's Towing Racing with Kennealy Keller Motorsports	41	T. J. Moon	Keith Swanson 1 Ryan Bell 2	1	
Ford	Jan's Towing Racing with Kennealy Keller Motorsports	41	Quinn Davis	Keith Swanson 1 Ryan Bell 2	2	
Ford	Kart Idaho Racing	08	Josiah Reaume	Mike Holleran	1	
Ford	Maples Motorsports	91	Ryan Vargas	Kyle Totman	1	
Ford	Naake-Klauer Motorsports	88	Joey Iest	Mike Naake	5	
Ford	Rodd Racing	68	Rodd Kneeland	P. J. Pedroncelli	1	
Toyota	Fast Track Racing	11	Dustin Hillenburg	Jeremy Petty	1	
Toyota	Fast Track Racing	12	Takuma Koga	Andrew Kierman	1	
Toyota	Jerry Pitts Racing	6	Caleb Shrader	Jerry Pitts	1	
Toyota	Joe Gibbs Racing	18	Max Reaves	Matt Ross	2	
Toyota	MBM Motorsports	66	Dystany Spurlock	Carl Long	1	
Toyota	MCM Racing Development	37	Esteban Rodríguez	Max Calles	2	
Toyota	Nitro Motorsports	10	Landon Brown	Jeff McClure	1	
Toyota	Nitro Motorsports	20	Jake Bollman	Doug George 2 Jeff McClure 1	1	
Toyota	Nitro Motorsports	20	Brad McAllister	Doug George 2 Jeff McClure 1	1	
Toyota	Nitro Motorsports	20	Kasey Kleyn	Doug George 2 Jeff McClure 1	1	
Toyota	Nitro Motorsports	55	Isabella Robusto	Glenn Parker	1	
Toyota	Nitro Motorsports	70	Jade Avedisian	Shannon Rursch 2 Jerry Pitts 1 Shane Wilson 1 Doug Richert 1 Glenn Parker 2	2	
Toyota	Nitro Motorsports	70	Thomas Annunziata	Shannon Rursch 2 Jerry Pitts 1 Shane Wilson 1 Doug Richert 1 Glenn Parker 2	1	
Toyota	Nitro Motorsports	70	Will Robinson (Note: Entry was fielded in collaboration with Jerry Pitts Racing.)	Shannon Rursch 2 Jerry Pitts 1 Shane Wilson 1 Doug Richert 1 Glenn Parker 2	1	
Toyota	Nitro Motorsports	70	Ethan Tovo	Shannon Rursch 2 Jerry Pitts 1 Shane Wilson 1 Doug Richert 1 Glenn Parker 2	1	
Toyota	Nitro Motorsports	70	Donald Theetge	Shannon Rursch 2 Jerry Pitts 1 Shane Wilson 1 Doug Richert 1 Glenn Parker 2	1	
Toyota	Nitro Motorsports	70	Hudson Sharp	Shannon Rursch 2 Jerry Pitts 1 Shane Wilson 1 Doug Richert 1 Glenn Parker 2	1	
Toyota	Nitro Motorsports	90	Jade Avedisian	Shane Wilson 2 Jeff Spraker 1 Doug Richert 1	1	
Toyota	Nitro Motorsports	90	Graham Jacobson	Shane Wilson 2 Jeff Spraker 1 Doug Richert 1	1	
Toyota	Nitro Motorsports	90	Wesley Slimp	Shane Wilson 2 Jeff Spraker 1 Doug Richert 1	2	
Toyota	Performance P-1 Motorsports	77	Alonso Salinas	Roger Bracken 4 Ryan Bell 2 Tony Jackson 3 Eric Nascimento 1	3	
Toyota	Performance P-1 Motorsports	77	Quinn Davis	Roger Bracken 4 Ryan Bell 2 Tony Jackson 3 Eric Nascimento 1	2	
Toyota	Performance P-1 Motorsports	77	Dave Smith	Roger Bracken 4 Ryan Bell 2 Tony Jackson 3 Eric Nascimento 1	1	
Toyota	Performance P-1 Motorsports	77	Ryan Vargas	Roger Bracken 4 Ryan Bell 2 Tony Jackson 3 Eric Nascimento 1	1	
Toyota	Performance P-1 Motorsports	77	Donald Witkowski	Roger Bracken 4 Ryan Bell 2 Tony Jackson 3 Eric Nascimento 1	4	
Toyota	Clark Racing	29	Ryan Phipps	Chris Bray	1	
Toyota	Philpott Race Cars	52	Ryan Philpott	Charles Dozhier	1	
Toyota	RAFA Racing Team	2	Isabella Robusto	Jeff Pope	1	
Toyota 6 Ford 4	Central Coast Racing	13	Sean Hingorani	Michael Muñoz	1	
Toyota 6 Ford 4	Central Coast Racing	13	Taylor Reimer	Michael Muñoz	1	
Toyota 6 Ford 4	Central Coast Racing	13	Jade Avedisian	Michael Muñoz	2	
Toyota 6 Ford 4	Central Coast Racing	13	Kenna Mitchell	Michael Muñoz	4	
Toyota 6 Ford 4	Central Coast Racing	13	Todd Souza	Michael Muñoz	2	
Toyota 3 Chevrolet 3	Cook Racing Technologies	17	Taylor Mayhew	Sean Samuels	6	
Toyota 5 Chevrolet 1	Kart Idaho Racing	38	Ray Bolinger	Dale Bolinger 5 Ray Bolinger 1	6	
Ford 1 Chevrolet 3 Toyota 2	Kart Idaho Racing	04	Ian Wood	Mike Holleran	6	
Chevrolet 5 Toyota 4	Nascimento Motorsports	4	Eric Nascimento	Mike Nascimento 7 Henry Nascimento 1	2	
Chevrolet 5 Toyota 4	Nascimento Motorsports	4	Monty Tipton	Mike Nascimento 7 Henry Nascimento 1	1	
Chevrolet 5 Toyota 4	Nascimento Motorsports	4	Kyle Keller	Mike Nascimento 7 Henry Nascimento 1	3	
Chevrolet 5 Toyota 4	Nascimento Motorsports	4	Ethan Nascimento	Mike Nascimento 7 Henry Nascimento 1	1	
Chevrolet 5 Toyota 4	Nascimento Motorsports	4	Wyatt Flowers	Mike Nascimento 7 Henry Nascimento 1	1	
Chevrolet 5 Toyota 4	Nascimento Motorsports	4	Sean Hingorani	Mike Nascimento 7 Henry Nascimento 1	1	

== Schedule ==
The full schedule was announced on December 2, 2025. Some race dates were announced before then as part of the announcement of the main ARCA Series schedule on October 4.

Notes:

- The race at Phoenix in March is a combination race with the ARCA Menards Series (highlighted in gold).

No	Race title	Track	Location	Date
1	Oil Workers 150	Kevin Harvick's Kern Raceway	Bakersfield, California	February 28
2	General Tire 150	Phoenix Raceway	Avondale, Arizona	March 5
3	Tucson ARCA Menards West 150	Tucson Speedway	Tucson, Arizona	April 11
4	Bill Schmitt Memorial 173 presented by the West Coast Stock Car Motorsports Hall of Fame	Shasta Speedway	Anderson, California	May 2
5	Legendary Billy Green 150 presented by NAPA Auto Parts	Colorado National Speedway	Dacono, Colorado	May 23
6	NAPA Auto Care 150 Greg Biffle Memorial	Tri-City Raceway	West Richland, Washington	June 6
7	General Tire 150	Sonoma Raceway	Sonoma, California	June 26
8	Portland 112	Portland International Raceway	Portland, Oregon	August 8
9	NAPA Auto Parts 150	All American Speedway	Roseville, California	September 5
10	Madera 150 presented by Madera Ford and the West Coast Stock Car Motorsports Hall of Fame	Madera Speedway	Madera, California	September 26
11	Kyle Busch Classic	The Bullring at Las Vegas Motor Speedway	Las Vegas, Nevada	October 2
12	Desert Diamond Casino West Valley 100*	Phoenix Raceway	Avondale, Arizona	October 17
13	NAPA Auto Parts 150 presented by the West Coast Stock Car Motorsports Hall of Fame*	Kevin Harvick's Kern Raceway	Bakersfield, California	October 31

== Results and standings ==
=== Race results ===
No.	Race	Pole position	Most laps led	Winning driver	Manufacturer	No.	Winning team	Report
1	Oil Workers 150 presented by the West Coast Stock Car Motorsports Hall of Fame	Jade Avedisian	Sean Hingorani	Mason Massey	Chevrolet	19	Bill McAnally Racing	Report
2	General Tire 150	Carson Brown	Carson Brown	Carson Brown	Chevrolet	28	Pinnacle Racing Group	Report
3	Tucson ARCA Menards West 150	Cole Denton	Cole Denton	Cole Denton	Ford	71	Jan's Towing Racing	Report
4	Bill Schmitt Memorial 173 presented by the West Coast Stock Car Motorsports Hall of Fame	Trevor Huddleston	Trevor Huddleston	Trevor Huddleston	Ford	50	High Point Racing	Report
5	Legendary Billy Green 150 presented by NAPA Auto Parts	Robbie Kennealy	Trevor Huddleston	Trevor Huddleston	Ford	50	High Point Racing	Report
6	NAPA Auto Care 150 Greg Biffle Memorial	Cole Denton	Cole Denton	Cole Denton	Ford	71	Jan's Towing Racing	Report
7	General Tire 150	Sam Corry	Sam Corry	Sam Corry	Toyota	25	Nitro Motorsports	Report
8	Portland 112	Ethan Tovo	Sam Corry	Mason Massey	Chevrolet	19	Bill McAnally Racing	Report
9	NAPA Auto Parts 150	Cole Denton	Trevor Huddleston	Ethan Nascimento	Chevrolet	4	Nascimento Motorsports	Report
10	Madera 150	Trevor Huddleston	Trevor Huddleston	Hailie Deegan	Chevrolet	16	Bill McAnally Racing	Report
11	Kyle Busch Classic	Helio Meza	Trevor Huddleston	Taylor Mayhew	Chevrolet	17	Cook Racing Technologies	Report
12	Desert Diamond Casino West Valley 100	Max Reaves	Max Reaves	Max Reaves	Toyota	18	Joe Gibbs Racing	Report
13	NAPA Auto Parts 150	Mia Lovell	Hailie Deegan	Hailie Deegan	Chevrolet	16	Bill McAnally Racing	Report

=== Drivers' championship ===
Notes:

- The pole winner also receives one bonus point, similar to the previous ARCA points system used until 2019 and unlike NASCAR.
- Additionally, after groups of five races of the season, drivers that compete in all five races receive fifty additional points. These points bonuses will be given after the races at Colorado and Madera.
  - Trevor Huddleston, Mason Massey, Robbie Kennealy, Hailie Deegan, Eric Johnson Jr., Cole Denton, Andrew Chapman, Gavin Ray, Mia Lovell, and David Smith received this points bonus for having competed in the first five races of the season (Kern in February, Phoenix in March, Tucson, Shasta, and Colorado). Huddleston, Massey, Kennealy, Deegan, Denton, Johnson, Chapman, Lovell, Ray, and Smith received this points bonus for having competed in the next five races (Tri-City, Sonoma, Portland, Roseville, and Madera). Huddleston, Massey, Kennealy, Deegan, Denton, Johnson, Lovell, Ray, Smith, Taylor Mayhew, Sam Corry, Ian Wood, and Ray Bolinger received this points bonus after competing in the final three races of the season (LVMS Bullring, Phoenix in October, and Kern in October).

(key) Bold – Pole position awarded by time. Italics – Pole position set by final practice results or rainout. * – Most laps led. ** – All laps led.

Pos	Driver	KER	PHO	TUC	SHA	CNS	TRI	SON	PIR	AAS	MAD	LVS	PHO	KER	Points
1	Trevor Huddleston	4	4	2	**1***	1*	2	9	13	2*	**2***	5*	7	5	685
2	Mason Massey	1	5	12	3	4	5	19	1	17	5	6	3	9	642
3	Robbie Kennealy	20	10	4	5	**2**	4	7	7	4	4	2	10	6	641
4	Hailie Deegan	6	11	7	7	7	14	20	3	3	1	16	6	1**	628
5	Cole Denton **(R)**	10	24	**1***	2	8	**1***	4	16	**6**	21	3	15	7	612
6	Eric Johnson Jr.	11	13	3	6	11	13	3	5	7	15	8	16	20	592
7	Mia Lovell **(R)**	12	30	8	9	6	3	2	11	18	13	23	8	**2**	578
8	Gavin Ray **(R)**	9	29	5	13	9	7	10	10	13	19	11	12	15	560
9	Andrew Chapman **(R)**	16	15	11	4	10	8	14	9	8	9	10	24		490
10	David Smith	18	26	15	12	16	12	17	20	14	18	19	22	25	489
11	Tyler Tomassi		33	14	10	14	9	16		11	14	7		13	299
12	Taylor Mayhew	3	8					12				1	13	4	277
13	Sam Corry						11	**1****	15*			22	11	17	245
14	Ian Wood								19	12	16	15	20	16	216
15	Ray Bolinger								25	19	20	25	27	24	174
16	Josiah Reaume				16		10		26	9	17			22	164
17	Joey Iest	7			15					16	6			21	148
18	Jade Avedisian	**8**	28	17			15						9		144
19	Kenna Mitchell				8					15	3			14	136
20	Eric Rhead	15		6							10	9			136
21	Will Robinson			16		13				5	8				134
22	Donald Witkowski									10	11	12		23	113
23	Quinn Davis			13			16					14	26		107
24	Cody Dennison	14	19										21	19	103
25	Julian DaCosta **(R)**	19	31	10	14										102
26	Alonso Salinas	17			11	12									92
27	Kyle Keller					5			21			20			86
28	Ethan Nascimento									1	7				84
29	Max Reaves		9										**1***		83
30	Vito Cancilla											4		10	74
31	Sean Hingorani	5*												11	74
32	Jeff Anton							8	6						74
33	Eric Nascimento	2						21							65
34	Jaiden Reyna	13	14												61
35	Todd Souza							6	24						58
36	Wesley Slimp												18	12	58
37	Taylor Reimer		32										2		55
38	Scotty Milan					15						21			52
39	Carson Brown		**1***												49
40	Ryan Vargas		17						22						49
41	Austin Varco	22							17						49
42	Helio Meza											**18**	23		49
43	Esteban Rodríguez												25	18	45
44	Tristan McKee		2												42
45	Kyle Steckly								2						42
46	Ethan Tovo								**4**						42
47	Thomas Annunziata		3												41
48	Cade Fox					3									41
49	Hudson Sharp													3	41
50	Gavan Boschele												4		40
51	Patrick Staropoli							5							39
52	Kasey Kleyn												5		39
53	Jake Bollman		6												38
54	T. J. Moon						6								38
55	Isaac Kitzmiller		7												37
56	Alex Quarterley								8						36
57	Tanner Huddleston													8	36
58	Bobby Hillis Jr.		38	Wth				Wth	14						36
59	Memphis Villarreal			9											35
60	Ryan Philpott							11							33
61	Graham Jacobson								12						33
62	Monty Tipton		12												32
63	Wyatt Flowers										12				32
64	Donald Theetge											13			31
65	Sage Karam							13							31
66	Dystany Spurlock												14		30
67	Tim Spurgeon							15							29
68	Jason Kitzmiller		16												28
69	Ryan Phipps											17			27
70	Landon Brown												17		27
71	Andy Jankowiak		18												26
72	Rodd Kneeland							18							26
73	Brad McAllister								18						26
74	Cassten Everidge												19		25
75	Michael Maples		20												24
76	Toby Blanton	21													23
77	Isabella Robusto		21										Wth		23
78	Alex Clubb		22												22
79	Dave Smith							22							22
80	Takuma Koga		23												21
81	Caleb Shrader								23						21
82	T. J. Curran											24			20
83	Tony Cosentino		25												19
84	Dustin Hillenburg		27						Wth						17
85	Brad Perez		34												10
86	Zachary Tinkle		35												9
87	Nate Moeller		36												8
88	Bobby Dale Earnhardt		37												7
89	Brad Smith		39												5
90	Jeff Maconi		40												4
	Jalen Mack	Wth													
	Jayda Mack	Wth													
	Austin Vaughn		Wth												
	Dale Quarterley								Wth						

== See also ==
- 2026 NASCAR Cup Series
- 2026 NASCAR O'Reilly Auto Parts Series
- 2026 NASCAR Craftsman Truck Series
- 2026 ARCA Menards Series
- 2026 ARCA Menards Series East
- 2026 NASCAR Whelen Modified Tour
- 2026 NASCAR Euro Series
- 2026 NASCAR Canada Series
- 2026 NASCAR Brasil Series
- 2026 CARS Tour
- 2026 SMART Modified Tour
- 2026 ASA STARS National Tour
