= Alonso Salinas =

Mexican racing driver

- Born: October 26, 2001 (age 25); Mexico City, Mexico

ARCA Menards Series West career
- 3 races run over 1 year
- Best finish: 26th (2026)
- First race: 2026 Oil Workers 150 presented by the West Coast Stock Car Motorsports Hall of Fame (Bakersfield)
- Last race: 2026 Legendary Billy Green 150 (Colorado)
Wins	Top tens	Poles
0	0	0
- Statistics up to date as of November 2, 2026.

Alonso Salinas (born October 26, 2001) is a Mexican professional stock car racing driver. He last competed part-time in the ARCA Menards Series West, driving the No. 77 Toyota for Performance P-1 Motorsports.

== Racing career ==
Salinas first began racing at the age of twelve. He ran in the Rotax Max Challenge Senior series from 2017 to 2020.

In 2021, Salinas made his debut in the Mikel's Truck Series, where he ran all but one race and earned nine top-ten finishes. He returned to the series the following year, where he drove for Tame Racing in the No. 09 truck. That year, he won his first race at Autódromo Monterrey, and earned nine top-tens and eight top-five finishes, as well as a pole at the season ending race at the Autódromo Hermanos Rodríguez. Salinas once again ran the full schedule in 2023, originally driving for Ramírez Racing before switching to ANVI Motorsports later in the year. He won one race at the Autódromo de Querétaro, and earned seven top-tens and five top-five finishes. In 2024, Salinas drove the No. 7 truck for HO Speed Racing, where won three races and earned ten top-tens and six top-five finishes. He was eventually crowned series champion after multiple drivers were given penalties from the season ending race in Mexico City.

In 2025, Salinas moved to the NASCAR Mexico Challenge, where he drove the No. 18 for Alpha Racing. That year, he qualified for the playoffs and finished seventh in the series standings with four top-fives and 13 top-ten finishes.

In 2026, it was revealed that Salinas will make his debut in the ARCA Menards Series West at Kevin Harvick's Kern Raceway, driving the No. 77 Toyota for Performance P-1 Motorsports.

== Motorsports results ==
=== ARCA Menards Series West ===
(key) (Bold – Pole position awarded by qualifying time. Italics – Pole position earned by points standings or practice time. * – Most laps led. ** – All laps led.)

ARCA Menards Series West results
Year	Team	No.	Make	1	2	3	4	5	6	7	8	9	10	11	12	13	AMSWC	Pts	Ref
2026	Performance P-1 Motorsports	77	Toyota	KER; 17	PHO	TUC	SHA; 11	CNS; 12	TRI	SON	PIR	AAS	MAD	LVS	PHO	KER	26th	92	
