= Cole Denton =

American racing driver (born 2010)

- Denton at Las Vegas Motor Speedway in 2026
- Born: July 26, 2010 (age 16); Pascagoula, Mississippi, U.S.
- Awards: 2026 ARCA Menards Series West Rookie of the Year

ARCA Menards Series career
- 1 race run over 1 year
- Best finish: 119th (2026)
- First race: 2026 General Tire 150 (Phoenix)
| Wins | Top tens | Poles |
|---|---|---|
| 0 | 0 | 0 |

ARCA Menards Series West career
- 13 races run over 1 year
- Best finish: 5th (2026)
- First race: 2026 Oil Workers 150 presented by the West Coast Stock Car Motorsports Hall of Fame (Bakersfield)
- Last race: 2026 NAPA Auto Parts 150 (Bakersfield)
- First win: 2026 Tucson ARCA Menards West 150 (Tucson)
- Last win: 2026 NAPA Auto Care 150 Greg Biffle Memorial (Tri-City)
| Wins | Top tens | Poles |
|---|---|---|
| 2 | 9 | 3 |
- Statistics up to date as of November 2, 2026.

Nicholas "Cole" Denton (born July 26, 2010) is an American professional stock car racing driver. He last competed full-time in the ARCA Menards Series West, driving the No. 71 Ford for Jan's Towing Racing.

== Racing career ==
Denton first began racing at the age of four, after receiving champ kart for Christmas and began racing the following year. From there, he raced in Bandoleros and Legends Cars, where he won 12 championships in 2022, including the national championship in his division in the INEX East National Championship, after winning 40 of 62 races. Denton went on to raced in the Thursday Thunder Legends Racing Series, where he won championships in 2024 and 2025 in the Young Lion and Semi-Pro divisions respectively. He also ran Legends Cars at Cordele Motor Speedway, where he won four championships.

Denton's No. 71 car at All American Speedway in 2026

In 2026, it was announced that Denton will drive full-time in the ARCA Menards Series West, driving the No. 71 Ford for Jan's Towing Racing. In April, he won his first series win at Tucson Speedway after starting on the pole and leading the most laps. Two months later in June, he won his second series win at Tri-City Raceway after starting on the pole and leading the most laps.

== Personal life ==
Denton's first name, Cole, which was shorted from his given name, Nicolas, was inspired by the character Cole Trickle from the film Days of Thunder.

== Motorsports career results ==
=== Stock car career summary ===
| Season | Series | Team | Races | Wins | Top 5 | Top 10 | Points | Position |
|---|---|---|---|---|---|---|---|---|
| 2026 | ARCA Menards Series West | Jan's Towing Racing | 13 | 2 | 5 | 9 | 612 | 5th |
| 2026 | ARCA Menards Series | Jan's Towing Racing | 1 | 0 | 0 | 0 | 20 | 119th |

=== ARCA Menards Series ===
(key) (Bold – Pole position awarded by qualifying time. Italics – Pole position earned by points standings or practice time. * – Most laps led. ** – All laps led.)

ARCA Menards Series results
| Year | Team | No. | Make | 1 | 2 | 3 | 4 | 5 | 6 | 7 | 8 | 9 | 10 | 11 | 12 | 13 | 14 | 15 | 16 | 17 | 18 | 19 | 20 | AMSC | Pts | Ref |
|---|---|---|---|---|---|---|---|---|---|---|---|---|---|---|---|---|---|---|---|---|---|---|---|---|---|---|
| 2026 | Jan's Towing Racing | 01 | Ford | DAY | PHO; 24 | KAN | TAL | GLN | TOL | MCH | POC | BER | ELK | CHI | LRP | IRP | IOW | ISF | MAD | DSF | SLM | BRI | KAN | 119th | 20 | |

==== ARCA Menards Series West ====
ARCA Menards Series West results
| Year | Team | No. | Make | 1 | 2 | 3 | 4 | 5 | 6 | 7 | 8 | 9 | 10 | 11 | 12 | 13 | AMSWC | Pts | Ref |
|---|---|---|---|---|---|---|---|---|---|---|---|---|---|---|---|---|---|---|---|
| 2026 | Jan's Towing Racing | 71 | Ford | KER; 10 | | **TUC**; 1* | SHA; 2 | CNS; 8 | **TRI**; 1* | SON; 4 | PIR; 16 | **AAS**; 6 | MAD; 21 | LVS; 3 | PHO; 15 | KER; 7 | 5th | 612 | |
| 2026 | Jan's Towing Racing | 01 | Ford | | PHO; 24 | | | | | | | | | | | | 5th | 612 | |
