= 2026 NAPA Auto Parts 150 (Kern) =

ARCA Menards Series West race at Kevin Harvick's Kern Raceway

2026 NAPA Auto Parts 150 presented by the West Coast Stock Car Motorsports Hall of Fame
Race details
- Race 13 of 13 in the 2026 ARCA Menards Series West
- Date: October 31, 2026
- Location: Kevin Harvick's Kern Raceway in Bakersfield, California
- Course: Permanent racing facility
- Course length: 0.500 miles (0.805 km)
- Distance: 42 laps, 21 mi (33.8 km)
- Scheduled distance: 150 laps, 75 mi (120.701 km)
- Average speed: 53.497 miles per hour (86.095 km/h)

Pole position
Driver	Mia Lovell	Nitro Motorsports
- Time: 18.466

Most laps led
Driver	Hailie Deegan	Bill McAnally Racing
- Laps: 42

Fastest lap
Driver	Hailie Deegan	Bill McAnally Racing
- Time: 18.938

Winner
No. 16	Hailie Deegan	Bill McAnally Racing

Television in the United States
- Network: FloRacing
- Announcers: Charles Krall

Radio in the United States
- Radio: ARN

The 2026 NAPA Auto Parts 150 presented by the West Coast Stock Car Motorsports Hall of Fame was an ARCA Menards Series West race held on Saturday, October 31, 2026, at Kevin Harvick's Kern Raceway in Bakersfield, California. Contested over 42 laps—decreased from 150 laps due to rain showers on the 0.500 miles (0.805 km) short track, it was the thirteenth and final race of the 2026 ARCA Menards Series West season, and the eleventh running of the event.

Hailie Deegan, driving for Bill McAnally Racing, grabbed the lead from pole-sitter Mia Lovell on the initial start, and continued to lead until lap 42 when the race was called due to constant rain showers in the area. This was Deegan's fourth career ARCA Menards Series West win, and her second of the season. Lovell finished second, and Hudson Sharp finished third in his series debut. Taylor Mayhew and Trevor Huddleston rounded out the top five, while Robbie Kennealy, Cole Denton, Tanner Huddleston, Mason Massey, and Vito Cancilla rounded out the top ten.

By virtue of starting the race, Trevor Huddleston clinched his second consecutive ARCA Menards Series West championship, 43 points ahead of Mason Massey.

== Report ==
=== Background ===
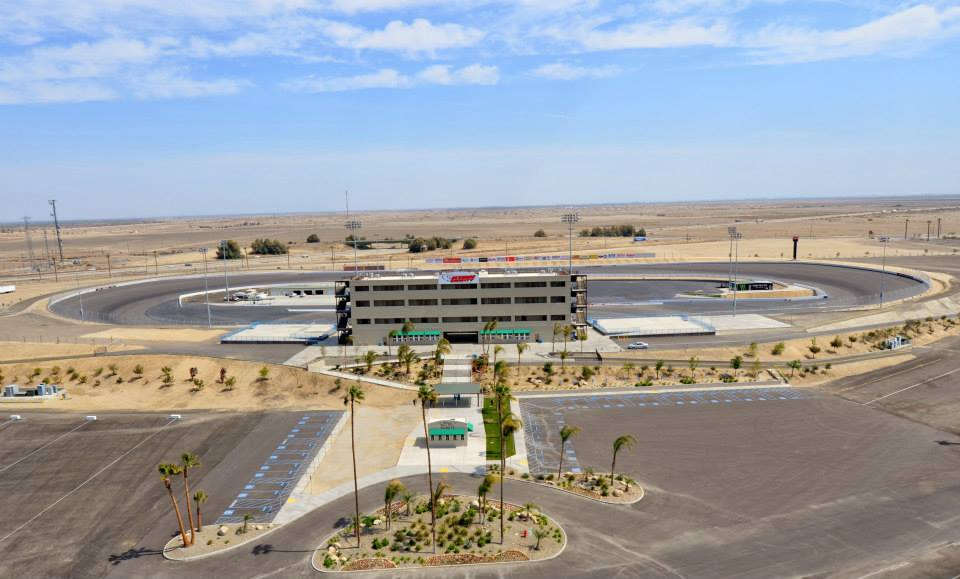
Kevin Harvick's Kern Raceway, the track where the race will be held.

Kevin Harvick's Kern Raceway (formerly Kern County Raceway Park) is a 0.5-mile (0.80 km) oval speedway located on CA 43 (Enos Lane) just off Interstate 5 in Bakersfield, Kern County, California, United States. Opened in 2013, it was built as a replacement for Mesa Marin Raceway.

Kevin Harvick's Kern Raceway hosts events with NASCAR's Whelen All-American Series along with an ARCA Menards Series West race since 2013.

The track has banks of 8° in the straightaways, with 14° paved corners. The track has 15,000 seats for fans, and room to expand to 17,000 seats for various events. It also contains 21 suites in the grandstand along with 18 concession stands.

==== Entry list ====
- (R) denotes rookie driver.

#	Driver	Team	Make
1	Robbie Kennealy	Jan's Towing Racing	Ford
04	Ian Wood	Kart Idaho Racing	Chevrolet
4	Sean Hingorani	Nascimento Motorsports	Chevrolet
05	David Smith	Shockwave Motorsports	Toyota
5	Eric Johnson Jr.	Jerry Pitts Racing	Toyota
7	Gavin Ray (R)	Jerry Pitts Racing	Toyota
08	Josiah Reaume	Kart Idaho Racing	Ford
13	Kenna Mitchell	Central Coast Racing	Toyota
15	Mia Lovell (R)	Nitro Motorsports	Toyota
16	Hailie Deegan	Bill McAnally Racing	Chevrolet
17	Taylor Mayhew	Cook Racing Technologies	Chevrolet
19	Mason Massey	Bill McAnally Racing	Chevrolet
20	Vito Cancilla	Bill McAnally Racing	Chevrolet
25	Sam Corry	Nitro Motorsports	Toyota
37	Esteban Rodríguez	MCM Racing Development	Toyota
38	Ray Bolinger	Kart Idaho Racing	Toyota
50	Trevor Huddleston	High Point Racing	Ford
51	Tyler Tomassi	Strike Mamba Racing	Chevrolet
55	Tanner Huddleston	High Point Racing	Ford
70	Hudson Sharp	Nitro Motorsports	Toyota
71	Cole Denton (R)	Jan's Towing Racing	Ford
72	Cody Dennison	Strike Mamba Racing	Chevrolet
77	Donald Witkowski	Performance P-1 Motorsports	Toyota
88	Joey Iest	Naake-Klauer Motorsports	Ford
90	Wesley Slimp	Nitro Motorsports	Toyota
Official entry list

== Practice ==
The first and only practice session was held on Saturday, October 31, at 2:45 PM PST, and lasted for 1 hour.

Trevor Huddleston, driving for High Point Racing, set the fastest time in the session, with a lap of 18.528 seconds, and a speed of 97.150 miles per hour (156.348 km/h).

=== Practice results ===
Pos.	#	Driver	Team	Make	Time	Speed
1	50	Trevor Huddleston	High Point Racing	Ford	18.528	97.150
2	16	Hailie Deegan	Bill McAnally Racing	Chevrolet	18.806	95.714
3	71	Cole Denton (R)	Jan's Towing Racing	Ford	18.858	95.450
Full practice results

== Qualifying ==
Qualifying was held on Saturday, October 31, at 4:15 PM PST. The qualifying procedure used was a single-car, two-lap system with one round. Drivers were on track by themselves and had two laps to post a qualifying time, and whoever set the fastest time won the pole.

Mia Lovell, driving for Nitro Motorsports, qualified on pole position with a lap of 18.466 seconds, and a speed of 97.476 miles per hour (156.872 km/h).

=== Qualifying results ===
Pos.	#	Driver	Team	Make	Time	Speed
1	15	Mia Lovell (R)	Nitro Motorsports	Toyota	18.466	97.476
2	16	Hailie Deegan	Bill McAnally Racing	Chevrolet	18.473	97.440
3	50	Trevor Huddleston	High Point Racing	Ford	18.487	97.366
4	1	Robbie Kennealy	Jan's Towing Racing	Ford	18.554	97.014
5	5	Eric Johnson Jr.	Jerry Pitts Racing	Toyota	18.613	96.707
6	88	Joey Iest	Naake-Klauer Motorsports	Ford	18.645	96.541
7	20	Vito Cancilla	Bill McAnally Racing	Chevrolet	18.649	96.520
8	17	Taylor Mayhew	Cook Racing Technologies	Chevrolet	18.684	96.339
9	4	Sean Hingorani	Nascimento Motorsports	Chevrolet	18.687	96.324
10	25	Sam Corry	Nitro Motorsports	Toyota	18.721	96.149
11	70	Hudson Sharp	Nitro Motorsports	Toyota	18.749	96.005
12	90	Wesley Slimp	Nitro Motorsports	Toyota	18.751	95.995
13	55	Tanner Huddleston	High Point Racing	Ford	18.757	95.964
14	71	Cole Denton (R)	Jan's Towing Racing	Ford	18.791	95.791
15	19	Mason Massey	Bill McAnally Racing	Chevrolet	18.999	94.742
16	7	Gavin Ray (R)	Jerry Pitts Racing	Toyota	19.019	94.642
17	51	Tyler Tomassi	Strike Mamba Racing	Chevrolet	19.148	94.005
18	37	Esteban Rodríguez	MCM Racing Development	Toyota	19.161	93.941
19	77	Donald Witkowski	Performance P-1 Motorsports	Toyota	19.236	93.575
20	13	Kenna Mitchell	Central Coast Racing	Toyota	19.434	92.621
21	04	Ian Wood	Kart Idaho Racing	Chevrolet	19.732	91.222
22	72	Cody Dennison	Strike Mamba Racing	Chevrolet	19.788	90.964
23	05	David Smith	Shockwave Motorsports	Toyota	19.826	90.790
24	38	Ray Bolinger	Kart Idaho Racing	Toyota	20.574	87.489
25	08	Josiah Reaume	Kart Idaho Racing	Ford	20.855	86.310
Official qualifying results

== Race ==
=== Race results ===
Laps: 42*

Fin	St	#	Driver	Team	Make	Laps	Led	Status	Pts
1	2	16	Hailie Deegan	Bill McAnally Racing	Chevrolet	42	42	Running	97
2	1	15	Mia Lovell (R)	Nitro Motorsports	Toyota	42	0	Running	93
3	11	70	Hudson Sharp	Nitro Motorsports	Toyota	42	0	Running	41
4	8	17	Taylor Mayhew	Cook Racing Technologies	Chevrolet	42	0	Running	90
5	3	50	Trevor Huddleston	High Point Racing	Ford	42	0	Running	89
6	4	1	Robbie Kennealy	Jan's Towing Racing	Ford	42	0	Running	88
7	14	71	Cole Denton (R)	Jan's Towing Racing	Ford	42	0	Running	87
8	13	55	Tanner Huddleston	High Point Racing	Ford	42	0	Running	36
9	15	19	Mason Massey	Bill McAnally Racing	Chevrolet	42	0	Running	85
10	7	20	Vito Cancilla	Bill McAnally Racing	Chevrolet	42	0	Running	34
11	9	4	Sean Hingorani	Nascimento Motorsports	Chevrolet	42	0	Running	33
12	12	90	Wesley Slimp	Nitro Motorsports	Toyota	42	0	Running	32
13	17	51	Tyler Tomassi	Strike Mamba Racing	Chevrolet	42	0	Running	31
14	20	13	Kenna Mitchell	Central Coast Racing	Toyota	42	0	Running	30
15	16	7	Gavin Ray (R)	Jerry Pitts Racing	Toyota	42	0	Running	79
16	21	04	Ian Wood	Kart Idaho Racing	Chevrolet	42	0	Running	78
17	10	25	Sam Corry	Nitro Motorsports	Toyota	42	0	Running	77
18	18	37	Esteban Rodríguez	MCM Racing Development	Toyota	42	0	Running	26
19	22	72	Cody Dennison	Strike Mamba Racing	Chevrolet	41	0	Running	25
20	5	5	Eric Johnson Jr.	Jerry Pitts Racing	Toyota	41	0	Running	74
21	6	88	Joey Iest	Naake-Klauer Motorsports	Ford	41	0	Running	23
22	25	08	Josiah Reaume	Kart Idaho Racing	Ford	40	0	Running	22
23	19	77	Donald Witkowski	Performance P-1 Motorsports	Toyota	40	0	Running	21
24	24	38	Ray Bolinger	Kart Idaho Racing	Toyota	40	0	Running	70
25	23	05	David Smith	Shockwave Motorsports	Toyota	40	0	Running	69
Official race results

=== Race statistics ===
- Lead changes: 0 among 1 different driver
- Cautions/Laps: 2 for 17 laps
- Red flags: 0
- Time of race: 23 minutes and 41 seconds
- Average speed: 53.497 miles per hour (86.095 km/h)

== Standings after the race ==
Drivers' Championship standings

	Pos	Driver	Points
	1	Trevor Huddleston	685
	2	Mason Massey	642 (–43)
	3	Robbie Kennealy	641 (–44)
	4	Hailie Deegan	628 (–57)
	5	Cole Denton	612 (–73)
	6	Eric Johnson Jr.	592 (–93)
1	7	Mia Lovell	578 (–107)
1	8	Gavin Ray	560 (–125)
2	9	Andrew Chapman	490 (–194)
	10	David Smith	489 (–195)

- Note: Only the first 10 positions are included for the driver standings.

Previous race: 2026 Desert Diamond Casino West Valley 100	ARCA Menards Series West; 2026 season	Next race: 2027 Oil Workers 150
