= 2026 Madera 150 =

ARCA Menards Series West race at Madera Speedway

2026 Madera 150 presented by the West Coast Stock Car Motorsports Hall of Fame
Race details
- Race 10 of 13 in the 2026 ARCA Menards Series West
- Date: September 26, 2026
- Location: Madera Speedway in Madera, California
- Course: Permanent racing facility
- Course length: 0.333 miles (0.536 km)
- Distance: 157 laps, 51 mi (82 km)
- Scheduled distance: 150 laps, 50 mi (80 km)
- Average speed: 54.441 miles per hour (87.614 km/h)

Pole position
Driver	Trevor Huddleston	High Point Racing
- Time: 14.808

Most laps led
Driver	Trevor Huddleston	High Point Racing
- Laps: 153

Winner
No. 16	Hailie Deegan	Bill McAnally Racing

Television in the United States
- Network: FloRacing
- Announcers: Charles Krall

Radio in the United States
- Radio: ARN

The 2026 Madera 150 presented by the West Coast Stock Car Motorsports Hall of Fame was an ARCA Menards Series West race held on Saturday, September 26, 2026, at Madera Speedway in Madera, California. Contested over 157 laps—extended from 150 laps due to an overtime finish on the 0.333-mile (0.536 km) short track, it was the tenth race of the 2026 ARCA Menards Series West season, and the 4th running of the event.

In a thrilling finish, Hailie Deegan, driving for Bill McAnally Racing, outdueled Trevor Huddleston in the final restart, making a last lap pass to earn her fourth career ARCA Menards Series West win, her first of the season, and her first since Colorado National Speedway in 2019. Huddleston continued to dominate on the short tracks, leading a race-high 153 laps, but for the second race in a row, lost the win in a last lap pass. At race's end, Huddleston finished second, and Kenna Mitchell finished third. Robbie Kennealy and Mason Massey rounded out the top five, while Joey Iest, Ethan Nascimento, Will Robinson, Andrew Chapman, and Eric Rhead rounded out the top ten.

== Report ==
Madera Speedway (formerly known as Madera Raceways from 1972 to 1976) is a 0.333 mi (0.536 km) oval short track in Madera, California. The facility has hosted a variety of events since its opening in 1972, including NASCAR-sanctioned events. The track is owned by the Madera District Fair as part of the Madera District Fairgrounds and led by track president and promoter Kenny Shepherd.

Prior to the construction of the current Madera Speedway, motorsports events were held at the Madera District Fairgrounds since the 1930s. In 1971, plans were announced for the construction of the current Madera Speedway, which was completed and opened in June of the following year. After being run by private operators for a decade, the track's operations was taken over by the Madera District Fair. After persistent financial struggles, motorsport businessmen Ken Clapp and Rick Gerhardt took over in 1995, helping stabilize the track's financial situation in the following decade. In 2006, under threat of closure due to surrounding commercial development, Madera Speedway's operations was taken over by former racing driver Kenny Shepherd, who made various renovations and revitalized the track in the following years.

=== Entry list ===
- (R) denotes rookie driver.

#	Driver	Team	Make
1	Robbie Kennealy	Jan's Towing Racing	Ford
04	Ian Wood	Kart Idaho Racing	Chevrolet
4	Wyatt Flowers	Nascimento Motorsports	Toyota
05	David Smith	Shockwave Motorsports	Toyota
5	Eric Johnson Jr.	Jerry Pitts Racing	Toyota
7	Gavin Ray (R)	Jerry Pitts Racing	Toyota
13	Kenna Mitchell	Central Coast Racing	Ford
15	Mia Lovell (R)	Nitro Motorsports	Toyota
16	Hailie Deegan	Bill McAnally Racing	Chevrolet
19	Mason Massey	Bill McAnally Racing	Chevrolet
21	Ethan Nascimento	Nascimento Motorsports	Chevrolet
25	Will Robinson	Nitro Motorsports	Toyota
38	Ray Bolinger	Kart Idaho Racing	Toyota
50	Trevor Huddleston	High Point Racing	Ford
51	Tyler Tomassi	Strike Mamba Racing	Chevrolet
55	Andrew Chapman (R)	High Point Racing	Ford
66	Eric Rhead	66 Rhead Racing	Chevrolet
71	Cole Denton (R)	Jan's Towing Racing	Ford
72	Josiah Reaume	Strike Mamba Racing	Chevrolet
77	Donald Witkowski	Performance P-1 Motorsports	Toyota
88	Joey Iest	Naake-Klauer Motorsports	Ford
Official entry list

== Practice ==
The first and only practice session was held on Saturday, September 26, at 2:30 PM PST, and lasted for 45 minutes.

Trevor Huddleston, driving for High Point Racing, set the fastest time in the session, with a lap of 14.807 seconds, and a speed of 80.962 miles per hour (130.296 km/h).

=== Practice results ===
Pos.	#	Driver	Team	Make	Time	Speed
1	50	Trevor Huddleston	High Point Racing	Ford	14.807	80.962
2	16	Hailie Deegan	Bill McAnally Racing	Chevrolet	14.832	80.825
3	7	Gavin Ray (R)	Jerry Pitts Racing	Toyota	14.948	80.198
Full practice results

== Qualifying ==
Qualifying was held on Saturday, September 26, at 4:15 PM PST. The qualifying procedure used was a single-car, two-lap system with one round. Drivers were on track by themselves and had two laps to post a qualifying time, and whoever set the fastest time won the pole.

Trevor Huddleston, driving for High Point Racing, qualified on pole position with a lap of 14.808 seconds, and a speed of 80.956 miles per hour (130.286 km/h).

=== Qualifying results ===
Pos.	#	Driver	Team	Make	Time	Speed
1	50	Trevor Huddleston	High Point Racing	Ford	14.808	80.956
2	19	Mason Massey	Bill McAnally Racing	Chevrolet	14.831	80.831
3	16	Hailie Deegan	Bill McAnally Racing	Chevrolet	14.888	80.521
4	15	Mia Lovell (R)	Nitro Motorsports	Toyota	14.918	80.359
5	7	Gavin Ray (R)	Jerry Pitts Racing	Toyota	14.927	80.311
6	1	Robbie Kennealy	Jan's Towing Racing	Ford	14.948	80.198
7	13	Kenna Mitchell	Central Coast Racing	Ford	14.951	80.182
8	55	Andrew Chapman (R)	High Point Racing	Ford	14.969	80.086
9	21	Ethan Nascimento	Nascimento Motorsports	Chevrolet	15.020	79.814
10	71	Cole Denton (R)	Jan's Towing Racing	Ford	15.024	79.792
11	88	Joey Iest	Naake-Klauer Motorsports	Ford	15.038	79.718
12	25	Will Robinson	Nitro Motorsports	Toyota	15.056	79.623
13	4	Wyatt Flowers	Nascimento Motorsports	Toyota	15.077	79.512
14	04	Ian Wood	Kart Idaho Racing	Chevrolet	15.174	79.004
15	77	Donald Witkowski	Performance P-1 Motorsports	Toyota	15.210	78.817
16	5	Eric Johnson Jr.	Jerry Pitts Racing	Toyota	15.218	78.775
17	66	Eric Rhead	66 Rhead Racing	Chevrolet	15.313	78.286
18	51	Tyler Tomassi	Strike Mamba Racing	Chevrolet	15.329	78.205
19	05	David Smith	Shockwave Motorsports	Toyota	15.402	77.834
20	72	Josiah Reaume	Strike Mamba Racing	Chevrolet	15.775	75.994
21	38	Ray Bolinger	Kart Idaho Racing	Toyota	16.362	73.267
Official qualifying results

== Race ==
=== Race results ===
Laps: 157

Fin	St	#	Driver	Team	Make	Laps	Led	Status	Pts
1	3	16	Hailie Deegan	Bill McAnally Racing	Chevrolet	157	1	Running	47
2	1	50	Trevor Huddleston	High Point Racing	Ford	157	153	Running	45
3	7	13	Kenna Mitchell	Central Coast Racing	Ford	157	0	Running	41
4	6	1	Robbie Kennealy	Jan's Towing Racing	Ford	157	0	Running	40
5	2	19	Mason Massey	Bill McAnally Racing	Chevrolet	157	3	Running	40
6	11	88	Joey Iest	Naake-Klauer Motorsports	Chevrolet	157	0	Running	38
7	9	21	Ethan Nascimento	Nascimento Motorsports	Chevrolet	157	0	Running	37
8	12	25	Will Robinson	Nitro Motorsports	Toyota	157	0	Running	36
9	8	55	Andrew Chapman (R)	High Point Racing	Ford	157	0	Running	35
10	17	66	Eric Rhead	66 Rhead Racing	Chevrolet	157	0	Running	34
11	15	77	Donald Witkowski	Performance P-1 Motorsports	Toyota	157	0	Running	33
12	13	4	Wyatt Flowers	Nascimento Motorsports	Toyota	157	0	Running	32
13	4	15	Mia Lovell (R)	Nitro Motorsports	Toyota	157	0	Running	31
14	18	51	Tyler Tomassi	Strike Mamba Racing	Chevrolet	157	0	Running	30
15	16	5	Eric Johnson Jr.	Jerry Pitts Racing	Toyota	155	0	Running	29
16	14	04	Ian Wood	Kart Idaho Racing	Chevrolet	153	0	Running	28
17	20	72	Josiah Reaume	Strike Mamba Racing	Chevrolet	152	0	Running	27
18	19	05	David Smith	Shockwave Motorsports	Toyota	152	0	Running	26
19	5	7	Gavin Ray (R)	Jerry Pitts Racing	Toyota	80	0	Mechanical	25
20	21	38	Ray Bolinger	Kart Idaho Racing	Toyota	56	0	Handling	24
21	10	71	Cole Denton (R)	Jan's Towing Racing	Ford	25	0	Mechanical	23
Official race results

=== Race statistics ===
- Lead changes: 5 among 3 different drivers
- Cautions/Laps: 7 for 41 laps
- Red flags: 0
- Time of race: 57 minutes and 6 seconds
- Average speed: 54.441 miles per hour (87.614 km/h)

== Standings after the race ==
Drivers' Championship standings

	Pos	Driver	Points
	1	Trevor Huddleston	518
	2	Mason Massey	478 (–40)
	3	Robbie Kennealy	476 (–42)
2	4	Hailie Deegan	465 (–53)
1	5	Cole Denton	455 (–63)
1	6	Eric Johnson Jr.	454 (–64)
	7	Andrew Chapman	436 (–82)
	8	Mia Lovell	428 (–90)
	9	Gavin Ray	416 (–102)
	10	David Smith	373 (–145)

- Note: Only the first 10 positions are included for the driver standings.

Previous race: 2026 NAPA Auto Parts 150 (Roseville)	ARCA Menards Series West; 2026 season	Next race: 2026 Kyle Busch Classic
