= 2026 NAPA Auto Parts 150 (Roseville) =

ARCA Menards Series West race at All American Speedway

Race details
- Race 9 of 13 in the 2026 ARCA Menards Series West
- Date: September 5, 2026
- Location: All American Speedway in Roseville, California
- Course: Permanent racing facility
- Course length: 0.333 miles (0.536 km)
- Distance: 150 laps, 50 mi (80 km)
- Average speed: 56.941 miles per hour (91.638 km/h)

Pole position
Driver	Cole Denton	Jan's Towing Racing
- Time: 13.797

Most laps led
Driver	Trevor Huddleston	High Point Racing
- Laps: 97

Fastest lap
Driver	Trevor Huddleston	High Point Racing
- Time: 14.162

Winner
No. 4	Ethan Nascimento	Nascimento Motorsports

Television in the United States
- Network: FloRacing
- Announcers: Charles Krall

Radio in the United States
- Radio: ARN

The 2026 NAPA Auto Parts 150 presented by the West Coast Stock Car Motorsports Hall of Fame was an ARCA Menards Series West race held on Saturday, September 5, 2026, at All American Speedway in Roseville, California. Contested over 150 laps on the 0.333-mile (0.536 km) short track, it was the 9th race of the 2026 ARCA Menards Series West season, and the 28th running of the event.

In a thrilling finish, Ethan Nascimento, driving for his family-owned Nascimento Motorsports, took advantage of a late restart, and held off Trevor Huddleston in a close finish to earn his first career ARCA Menards Series West win. Huddleston dominated the majority of the race, leading a race-high 97 laps after starting in sixth. At race's end, Huddleston finished second, and Hailie Deegan finished third. Robbie Kennealy and Will Robinson rounded out the top five, while Cole Denton, Eric Johnson Jr., Andrew Chapman, Josiah Reaume, and Donald Witkowski rounded out the top ten.

== Report ==
=== Background ===
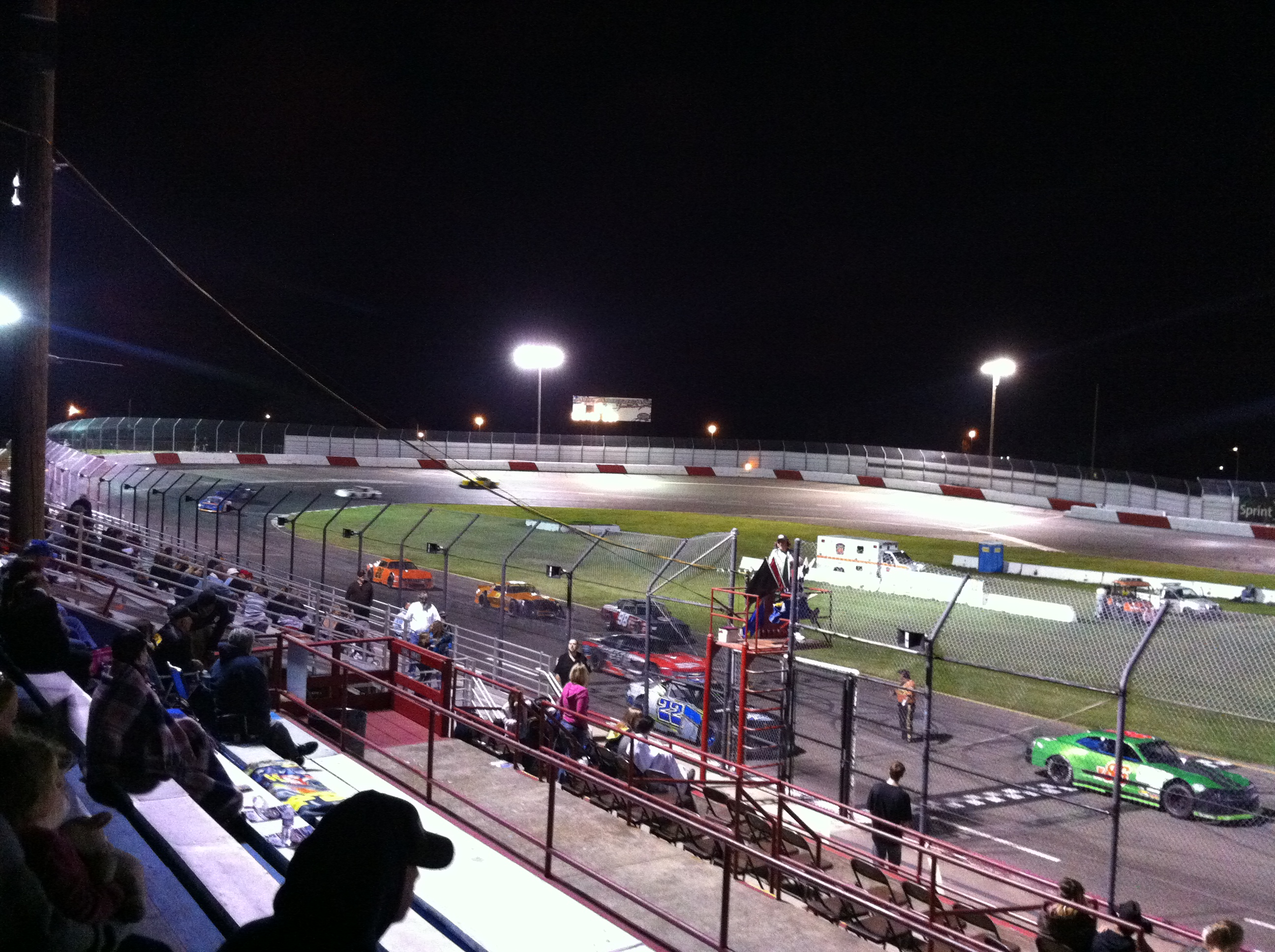
All American Speedway, the track where the race was held.

All American Speedway is a 1/3-mile NASCAR-sanctioned paved oval racetrack located in Roseville, California.

The track first began operations in 1954. The track was originally a quarter mile long, but was renovated before the 2008 racing season to its current length of one third of a mile.

Between the years 1977 and 1982, five NASCAR Winston Grand National West Series events were held at the track. Since the renovation prior to the 2008 season, sixteen more ARCA Menards Series West races have been held at the track. The venue also hosts an annual round of the SRL Southwest Tour.

==== Entry list ====
- (R) denotes rookie driver.

#	Driver	Team	Make
1	Robbie Kennealy	Jan's Towing Racing	Ford
04	Ian Wood	Kart Idaho Racing	Ford
4	Ethan Nascimento	Nascimento Motorsports	Chevrolet
05	David Smith	Shockwave Motorsports	Toyota
5	Eric Johnson Jr.	Jerry Pitts Racing	Toyota
7	Gavin Ray (R)	Jerry Pitts Racing	Ford
13	Kenna Mitchell	Central Coast Racing	Ford
15	Mia Lovell (R)	Nitro Motorsports	Toyota
16	Hailie Deegan	Bill McAnally Racing	Chevrolet
19	Mason Massey	Bill McAnally Racing	Chevrolet
25	Will Robinson	Nitro Motorsports	Toyota
38	Ray Bolinger	Kart Idaho Racing	Toyota
50	Trevor Huddleston	High Point Racing	Ford
51	Tyler Tomassi	Strike Mamba Racing	Chevrolet
55	Andrew Chapman (R)	High Point Racing	Ford
71	Cole Denton (R)	Jan's Towing Racing	Ford
72	Josiah Reaume	Strike Mamba Racing	Chevrolet
77	Donald Witkowski	Performance P-1 Motorsports	Toyota
88	Joey Iest	Naake-Klauer Motorsports	Ford
Official entry list

== Practice ==
The first and only practice session was held on Saturday, September 5, at 3:00 PM PST, and lasted for 60 minutes.

Trevor Huddleston, driving for High Point Racing, set the fastest time in the session, with a lap of 13.871 seconds, and a speed of 86.425 miles per hour (139.088 km/h).

=== Practice results ===
Pos.	#	Driver	Team	Make	Time	Speed
1	50	Trevor Huddleston	High Point Racing	Ford	13.871	86.425
2	16	Hailie Deegan	Bill McAnally Racing	Chevrolet	13.926	86.084
3	4	Ethan Nascimento	Nascimento Motorsports	Chevrolet	13.944	85.972
Full practice results

== Qualifying ==
Qualifying was held on Saturday, September 5, at 4:20 PM PST. The qualifying procedure used was a single-car, two-lap based system. Drivers were on track by themselves and had two laps to post a qualifying time, and whoever set the fastest time won the pole.

Cole Denton, driving for Jan's Towing Racing, qualified on pole position with a lap of 13.797 seconds, and a speed of 86.888 miles per hour (139.833 km/h).

=== Qualifying results ===
Pos.	#	Driver	Team	Make	Time	Speed
1	71	Cole Denton (R)	Jan's Towing Racing	Ford	13.797	86.888
2	5	Eric Johnson Jr.	Jerry Pitts Racing	Toyota	13.889	86.313
3	16	Hailie Deegan	Bill McAnally Racing	Chevrolet	13.896	86.269
4	1	Robbie Kennealy	Jan's Towing Racing	Ford	13.906	86.207
5	19	Mason Massey	Bill McAnally Racing	Chevrolet	13.929	86.065
6	50	Trevor Huddleston	High Point Racing	Ford	13.944	85.972
7	7	Gavin Ray (R)	Jerry Pitts Racing	Toyota	13.946	85.960
8	55	Andrew Chapman (R)	High Point Racing	Ford	13.953	85.917
9	4	Ethan Nascimento	Nascimento Motorsports	Chevrolet	13.991	85.684
10	25	Will Robinson	Nitro Motorsports	Toyota	14.016	85.531
11	13	Kenna Mitchell	Central Coast Racing	Ford	14.028	85.458
12	77	Donald Witkowski	Performance P-1 Motorsports	Toyota	14.138	84.793
13	51	Tyler Tomassi	Strike Mamba Racing	Chevrolet	14.367	83.441
14	05	David Smith	Shockwave Motorsports	Toyota	14.465	82.876
15	88	Joey Iest	Naake-Klauer Motorsports	Ford	14.570	82.279
16	72	Josiah Reaume	Strike Mamba Racing	Chevrolet	15.162	79.066
17	38	Ray Bolinger	Kart Idaho Racing	Toyota	15.474	77.472
18	15	Mia Lovell (R)	Nitro Motorsports	Toyota	—	—
19	04	Ian Wood	Kart Idaho Racing	Chevrolet	—	—
Official qualifying results

== Race ==
=== Race results ===
Laps: 150

Fin	St	#	Driver	Team	Make	Laps	Led	Status	Pts
1	9	4	Ethan Nascimento	Nascimento Motorsports	Chevrolet	150	2	Running	47
2	6	50	Trevor Huddleston	High Point Racing	Ford	150	97	Running	44
3	3	16	Hailie Deegan	Bill McAnally Racing	Chevrolet	150	0	Running	41
4	4	1	Robbie Kennealy	Jan's Towing Racing	Ford	150	0	Running	40
5	10	25	Will Robinson	Nitro Motorsports	Toyota	150	0	Running	39
6	1	71	Cole Denton (R)	Jan's Towing Racing	Ford	150	32	Running	40
7	2	5	Eric Johnson Jr.	Jerry Pitts Racing	Toyota	150	19	Running	38
8	8	55	Andrew Chapman (R)	High Point Racing	Ford	150	0	Running	36
9	16	72	Josiah Reaume	Strike Mamba Racing	Chevrolet	147	0	Running	35
10	12	77	Donald Witkowski	Performance P-1 Motorsports	Toyota	147	0	Running	34
11	13	51	Tyler Tomassi	Strike Mamba Racing	Chevrolet	146	0	Running	33
12	19	04	Ian Wood	Kart Idaho Racing	Chevrolet	146	0	Running	32
13	7	7	Gavin Ray (R)	Jerry Pitts Racing	Toyota	142	0	Running	31
14	14	05	David Smith	Shockwave Motorsports	Toyota	141	0	Running	30
15	11	13	Kenna Mitchell	Central Coast Racing	Ford	119	0	Mechanical	29
16	15	88	Joey Iest	Naake-Klauer Motorsports	Ford	104	0	Mechanical	28
17	5	19	Mason Massey	Bill McAnally Racing	Chevrolet	87	0	Mechanical	27
18	18	15	Mia Lovell (R)	Nitro Motorsports	Toyota	28	0	Accident	26
19	17	38	Ray Bolinger	Kart Idaho Racing	Toyota	27	0	Mechanical	25
Official race results

=== Race statistics ===
- Lead changes: 5 among 4 different drivers
- Cautions/Laps: 5 for 39 laps
- Red flags: 0
- Time of race: 52 minutes and 38 seconds
- Average speed: 56.941 miles per hour (91.638 km/h)

== Standings after the race ==
Drivers' Championship standings

	Pos	Driver	Points
	1	Trevor Huddleston	423
	2	Mason Massey	388 (–35)
	3	Robbie Kennealy	386 (–37)
	4	Cole Denton	382 (–41)
	5	Eric Johnson Jr.	375 (–48)
	6	Hailie Deegan	368 (–55)
1	7	Andrew Chapman	351 (–72)
1	8	Mia Lovell	347 (–76)
	9	Gavin Ray	341 (–82)
	10	David Smith	297 (–126)

- Note: Only the first 10 positions are included for the driver standings.

Previous race: 2026 Portland 112	ARCA Menards Series West; 2026 season	Next race: 2026 Madera 150
