= 2026 Bill Schmitt Memorial 173 =

ARCA Menards Series West race at Shasta Speedway

2026 Bill Schmitt Memorial 173 presented by the West Coast Stock Car Motorsports Hall of Fame
Race details
- Race 4 of 13 in the 2026 ARCA Menards Series West
- Date: May 2, 2026
- Location: Shasta Speedway in Anderson, California
- Course: Permanent racing facility
- Course length: 0.375 miles (0.604 km)
- Distance: 173 laps, 64.875 mi (104.406 km)
- Average speed: 61.171 miles per hour (98.445 km/h)

Pole position
Driver	Trevor Huddleston	High Point Racing
- Time: 15.920

Most laps led
Driver	Trevor Huddleston	High Point Racing
- Laps: 149

Fastest lap
Driver	Trevor Huddleston	High Point Racing
- Time: 16.410

Winner
No. 50	Trevor Huddleston	High Point Racing

Television in the United States
- Network: FloRacing; NASCAR Channel
- Announcers: Charles Krall lap by lap, Nathan Prouty analyst, & Steven Blakesley reporter

Radio in the United States
- Radio: ARN

The 2026 Bill Schmitt Memorial 173 presented by the West Coast Stock Car Motorsports Hall of Fame was an ARCA Menards Series West race held on Saturday, May 2, 2026, at Shasta Speedway in Anderson, California. Contested over 173 laps on the 0.375 miles (0.604 km) short track, it was the fourth race of the 2026 ARCA Menards Series West season, and the third running of the event.

Trevor Huddleston, driving for High Point Racing, pulled off a dominating performance, leading all but one lap from the pole position to earn his 10th career ARCA Menards Series West win, and his first of the season. Cole Denton finished second, and Mason Massey finished third. Andrew Chapman and Robbie Kennealy rounded out the top five, while Eric Johnson Jr., Hailie Deegan, Kenna Mitchell, Mia Lovell, and Tyler Tomassi rounded out the top ten.

This was the second race of "ARCA Night in America", a doubleheader feature with the ARCA Menards Series East race on the same day, both being streamed on the NASCAR Channel and FloRacing.

== Report ==
=== Background ===
Shasta Speedway is a 0.375 mi (0.604 km) asphalt oval race track located in Anderson, California. Shasta Speedway is currently being featured in the ARCA Menards Series West division of NASCAR. The track was named after Shasta County, the county that Anderson, California and the speedway are located in.

The track currently holds events for super late models, legends, mini stocks, super modifieds, hornets, bombers, and monster trucks.

==== Entry list ====
- (R) denotes rookie driver.

#	Driver	Team	Make
1	Robbie Kennealy	Jan's Towing Racing	Ford
05	David Smith	Shockwave Motorsports	Toyota
5	Eric Johnson Jr.	Jerry Pitts Racing	Toyota
7	Gavin Ray (R)	Jerry Pitts Racing	Toyota
13	Kenna Mitchell	Central Coast Racing	Toyota
15	Mia Lovell (R)	Nitro Motorsports	Toyota
16	Hailie Deegan	Bill McAnally Racing	Chevrolet
19	Mason Massey	Bill McAnally Racing	Chevrolet
25	Julian DaCosta (R)	Nitro Motorsports	Toyota
50	Trevor Huddleston	High Point Racing	Ford
51	Tyler Tomassi	Strike Mamba Racing	Chevrolet
55	Andrew Chapman (R)	High Point Racing	Ford
71	Cole Denton (R)	Jan's Towing Racing	Ford
72	Josiah Reaume	Strike Mamba Racing	Chevrolet
77	Alonso Salinas	Performance P-1 Motorsports	Toyota
88	Joey Iest	Naake-Klauer Motorsports	Ford
Official entry list

== Practice ==
The first and only practice session was held on Saturday, May 2, at 3:30 PM PST, and lasted for 1 hour.

Trevor Huddleston, driving for High Point Racing, set the fastest time in the session, with a lap of 16.199 seconds, and a speed of 83.338 miles per hour (134.120 km/h).

=== Practice results ===
Pos.	#	Driver	Team	Make	Time	Speed
1	50	Trevor Huddleston	High Point Racing	Ford	16.199	83.338
2	19	Mason Massey	Bill McAnally Racing	Chevrolet	16.269	82.980
3	13	Kenna Mitchell	Central Coast Racing	Toyota	16.400	82.317
Full practice results

== Qualifying ==
Qualifying was held on Saturday, May 2, at 5:20 PM PST. The qualifying procedure used was a single-car, two-lap based system. Drivers were on track by themselves and had two laps to post a qualifying time, and whoever set the fastest time won the pole.

Trevor Huddleston, driving for High Point Racing, qualified on pole position with a lap of 15.920 seconds, and a speed of 84.799 miles per hour (136.471 km/h).

=== Qualifying results ===
Pos.	#	Driver	Team	Make	Time	Speed
1	50	Trevor Huddleston	High Point Racing	Ford	15.920	84.799
2	19	Mason Massey	Bill McAnally Racing	Chevrolet	16.047	84.128
3	71	Cole Denton (R)	Jan's Towing Racing	Ford	16.083	83.940
4	1	Robbie Kennealy	Jan's Towing Racing	Ford	16.150	83.591
5	55	Andrew Chapman (R)	High Point Racing	Ford	16.179	83.441
6	88	Joey Iest	Naake-Klauer Motorsports	Ford	16.204	83.313
7	16	Hailie Deegan	Bill McAnally Racing	Chevrolet	16.286	82.893
8	13	Kenna Mitchell	Central Coast Racing	Toyota	16.311	82.766
9	25	Julian DaCosta (R)	Nitro Motorsports	Toyota	16.324	82.700
10	5	Eric Johnson Jr.	Jerry Pitts Racing	Toyota	16.325	82.695
11	15	Mia Lovell (R)	Nitro Motorsports	Toyota	16.340	82.619
12	51	Tyler Tomassi	Strike Mamba Racing	Chevrolet	16.427	82.182
13	7	Gavin Ray (R)	Jerry Pitts Racing	Toyota	16.444	82.097
14	77	Alonso Salinas	Performance P-1 Motorsports	Toyota	16.747	80.611
15	05	David Smith	Shockwave Motorsports	Toyota	16.868	80.033
16	72	Josiah Reaume	Strike Mamba Racing	Chevrolet	19.222	70.232
Official qualifying results

== Race ==
=== Race results ===
Laps: 173

Fin	St	#	Driver	Team	Make	Laps	Led	Status	Pts
1	1	50	Trevor Huddleston	High Point Racing	Ford	173	172	Running	49
2	3	71	Cole Denton (R)	Jan's Towing Racing	Ford	173	0	Running	42
3	2	19	Mason Massey	Bill McAnally Racing	Chevrolet	173	1	Running	42
4	5	55	Andrew Chapman (R)	High Point Racing	Ford	173	0	Running	40
5	4	1	Robbie Kennealy	Jan's Towing Racing	Ford	173	0	Running	39
6	10	5	Eric Johnson Jr.	Jerry Pitts Racing	Toyota	173	0	Running	38
7	7	16	Hailie Deegan	Bill McAnally Racing	Chevrolet	173	0	Running	37
8	8	13	Kenna Mitchell	Central Coast Racing	Toyota	173	0	Running	36
9	11	15	Mia Lovell (R)	Nitro Motorsports	Toyota	173	0	Running	35
10	12	51	Tyler Tomassi	Strike Mamba Racing	Chevrolet	173	0	Running	34
11	14	77	Alonso Salinas	Performance P-1 Motorsports	Toyota	173	0	Running	33
12	15	05	David Smith	Shockwave Motorsports	Toyota	161	0	Running	32
13	13	7	Gavin Ray (R)	Jerry Pitts Racing	Toyota	146	0	Running	31
14	9	25	Julian DaCosta (R)	Nitro Motorsports	Toyota	136	0	Mechanical	30
15	6	88	Joey Iest	Naake-Klauer Motorsports	Ford	89	0	Transmission	29
16	16	72	Josiah Reaume	Strike Mamba Racing	Chevrolet	17	0	Accident	28
Official race results

=== Race statistics ===
- Lead changes: 2 among 2 different drivers
- Cautions/Laps: 5 for 36 laps
- Red flags: 0
- Time of race: 1 hour, 3 minutes and 3 seconds
- Average speed: 61.171 miles per hour (98.445 km/h)

== Standings after the race ==
Drivers' Championship standings

	Pos	Driver	Points
	1	Trevor Huddleston	172
	2	Mason Massey	160 (–12)
2	3	Cole Denton	145 (–27)
1	4	Hailie Deegan	145 (–27)
1	5	Eric Johnson Jr.	143 (–29)
	6	Robbie Kennealy	138 (–34)
	7	Andrew Chapman	130 (–42)
	8	Gavin Ray	120 (–52)
	9	Mia Lovell	117 (–55)
2	10	David Smith	106 (–66)

- Note: Only the first 10 positions are included for the driver standings.

Previous race: 2026 Tucson ARCA Menards West 150	ARCA Menards Series West; 2026 season	Next race: 2026 Legendary Billy Green 150
