= 2026 NAPA Auto Care 150 Greg Biffle Memorial =

ARCA Menards Series West race at Tri-City Raceway

Race details
- Race 6 of 13 in the 2026 ARCA Menards Series West
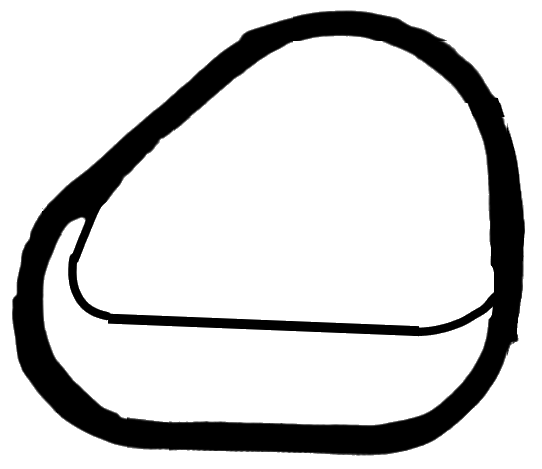
- Date: June 6, 2026
- Location: Tri-City Raceway in West Richland, Washington
- Course: Permanent racing facility
- Course length: 0.500 miles (0.805 km)
- Distance: 150 laps, 75 mi (120.701 km)
- Average speed: 68.895 miles per hour (110.876 km/h)

Pole position
| Driver | Cole Denton | Jan's Towing Racing |
- Time: 18.578

Most laps led
| Driver | Cole Denton | Jan's Towing Racing |
- Laps: 101

Winner
| No. 71 | Cole Denton | Jan's Towing Racing |

Television in the United States
- Network: FloRacing
- Announcers: Charles Krall

Radio in the United States
- Radio: ARN

The 2026 NAPA Auto Care 150 Greg Biffle Memorial was an ARCA Menards Series West race held on Saturday, June 6, 2026, at Tri-City Raceway in West Richland, Washington. Contested over 150 laps on the 0.500 miles (0.805 km) short track, it was the sixth race of the 2026 ARCA Menards Series West season, and the third running of the event.

Cole Denton, driving for Jan's Towing Racing, brought an end to Trevor Huddleston's winning streak, pulling off a dominating performance by leading a race-high 101 laps from the pole position to earn his second career ARCA Menards Series West win, and his second of the season. Huddleston finished second, and Mia Lovell finished third. Robbie Kennealy and Mason Massey rounded out the top five, while T. J. Moon (in his series debut), Gavin Ray, Andrew Chapman, Tyler Tomassi, and Josiah Reaume rounded out the top ten.

== Report ==
=== Background ===
Tri-City Raceway is a 0.500 mi (0.805 km) asphalt oval race track located in West Richland, Washington. Tri-City Raceway is currently being featured in the ARCA Menards Series West division of NASCAR. The track was built to represent and named after the three nearby cities to the racetrack. The track is the only 0.500 mi (0.805 km) mile paved trioval in North America.

==== Entry list ====
- (R) denotes rookie driver.

| # | Driver | Team | Make |
|---|---|---|---|
| 1 | Robbie Kennealy | Jan's Towing Racing | Ford |
| 05 | David Smith | Shockwave Motorsports | Toyota |
| 5 | Eric Johnson Jr. | Jerry Pitts Racing | Toyota |
| 7 | Gavin Ray (R) | Jerry Pitts Racing | Toyota |
| 13 | Jade Avedisian | Central Coast Racing | Toyota |
| 15 | Mia Lovell (R) | Nitro Motorsports | Toyota |
| 16 | Hailie Deegan | Bill McAnally Racing | Chevrolet |
| 19 | Mason Massey | Bill McAnally Racing | Chevrolet |
| 25 | Sam Corry | Nitro Motorsports | Toyota |
| 41 | T. J. Moon | Jan's Towing Racing | Ford |
| 50 | Trevor Huddleston | High Point Racing | Ford |
| 51 | Tyler Tomassi | Strike Mamba Racing | Chevrolet |
| 55 | Andrew Chapman (R) | High Point Racing | Ford |
| 71 | Cole Denton (R) | Jan's Towing Racing | Ford |
| 72 | Josiah Reaume | Strike Mamba Racing | Chevrolet |
| 77 | Quinn Davis | Performance P-1 Motorsports | Toyota |
Official entry list

== Practice ==
The first and only practice session was held on Saturday, June 6, at 2:45 PM PST, and lasted for 1 hour.

Cole Denton, driving for Jan's Towing Racing, set the fastest time in the session, with a lap of 18.853 seconds, and a speed of 95.476 miles per hour (153.654 km/h).

=== Practice results ===
| Pos. | # | Driver | Team | Make | Time | Speed |
|---|---|---|---|---|---|---|
| 1 | 71 | Cole Denton (R) | Jan's Towing Racing | Ford | 18.853 | 95.476 |
| 2 | 16 | Hailie Deegan | Bill McAnally Racing | Chevrolet | 18.886 | 95.309 |
| 3 | 15 | Mia Lovell (R) | Nitro Motorsports | Toyota | 18.983 | 94.822 |
Full practice results

== Qualifying ==
Qualifying was held on Saturday, June 6, at 4:45 PM PST. The qualifying procedure used was a single-car, two-lap based system. Drivers were on track by themselves and had two laps to post a qualifying time, and whoever set the fastest time won the pole.

Cole Denton, driving for Jan's Towing Racing, qualified on pole position with a lap of 18.578 seconds, and a speed of 96.889 miles per hour (155.928 km/h).

=== Qualifying results ===
| Pos. | # | Driver | Team | Make | Time | Speed |
|---|---|---|---|---|---|---|
| 1 | 71 | Cole Denton (R) | Jan's Towing Racing | Ford | 18.578 | 96.889 |
| 2 | 50 | Trevor Huddleston | High Point Racing | Ford | 18.682 | 96.349 |
| 3 | 16 | Hailie Deegan | Bill McAnally Racing | Chevrolet | 18.716 | 96.174 |
| 4 | 15 | Mia Lovell (R) | Nitro Motorsports | Toyota | 18.755 | 95.974 |
| 5 | 1 | Robbie Kennealy | Jan's Towing Racing | Ford | 18.853 | 95.476 |
| 6 | 19 | Mason Massey | Bill McAnally Racing | Chevrolet | 18.950 | 94.987 |
| 7 | 25 | Sam Corry | Nitro Motorsports | Toyota | 18.960 | 94.937 |
| 8 | 5 | Eric Johnson Jr. | Jerry Pitts Racing | Toyota | 18.987 | 94.802 |
| 9 | 55 | Andrew Chapman (R) | High Point Racing | Ford | 19.045 | 94.513 |
| 10 | 13 | Jade Avedisian | Central Coast Racing | Toyota | 19.105 | 94.216 |
| 11 | 41 | T. J. Moon | Jan's Towing Racing | Ford | 19.144 | 94.024 |
| 12 | 51 | Tyler Tomassi | Strike Mamba Racing | Chevrolet | 19.171 | 93.892 |
| 13 | 7 | Gavin Ray (R) | Jerry Pitts Racing | Toyota | 19.205 | 93.726 |
| 14 | 77 | Quinn Davis | Performance P-1 Motorsports | Toyota | 19.917 | 90.375 |
| 15 | 05 | David Smith | Shockwave Motorsports | Toyota | 20.485 | 87.869 |
| 16 | 72 | Josiah Reaume | Strike Mamba Racing | Chevrolet | 20.710 | 86.915 |
Official qualifying results

== Race ==
=== Race results ===
Laps: 150

| Fin | St | # | Driver | Team | Make | Laps | Led | Status | Pts |
|---|---|---|---|---|---|---|---|---|---|
| 1 | 1 | 71 | Cole Denton (R) | Jan's Towing Racing | Ford | 150 | 101 | Running | 49 |
| 2 | 2 | 50 | Trevor Huddleston | High Point Racing | Ford | 150 | 49 | Running | 43 |
| 3 | 4 | 15 | Mia Lovell (R) | Nitro Motorsports | Toyota | 150 | 0 | Running | 41 |
| 4 | 5 | 1 | Robbie Kennealy | Jan's Towing Racing | Ford | 150 | 0 | Running | 40 |
| 5 | 6 | 19 | Mason Massey | Bill McAnally Racing | Chevrolet | 150 | 0 | Running | 39 |
| 6 | 11 | 41 | T. J. Moon | Jan's Towing Racing | Ford | 150 | 0 | Running | 38 |
| 7 | 13 | 7 | Gavin Ray (R) | Jerry Pitts Racing | Toyota | 150 | 0 | Running | 37 |
| 8 | 9 | 55 | Andrew Chapman (R) | High Point Racing | Ford | 150 | 0 | Running | 36 |
| 9 | 12 | 51 | Tyler Tomassi | Strike Mamba Racing | Chevrolet | 149 | 0 | Running | 35 |
| 10 | 16 | 72 | Josiah Reaume | Strike Mamba Racing | Chevrolet | 143 | 0 | Running | 34 |
| 11 | 7 | 25 | Sam Corry | Nitro Motorsports | Toyota | 140 | 0 | Running | 33 |
| 12 | 15 | 05 | David Smith | Shockwave Motorsports | Toyota | 139 | 0 | Running | 32 |
| 13 | 8 | 5 | Eric Johnson Jr. | Jerry Pitts Racing | Toyota | 133 | 0 | Running | 31 |
| 14 | 3 | 16 | Hailie Deegan | Bill McAnally Racing | Chevrolet | 108 | 0 | Accident | 30 |
| 15 | 10 | 13 | Jade Avedisian | Central Coast Racing | Toyota | 107 | 0 | Accident | 29 |
| 16 | 14 | 77 | Quinn Davis | Performance P-1 Motorsports | Toyota | 25 | 0 | Engine | 28 |
Official race results

=== Race statistics ===
- Lead changes: 4 among 2 different drivers
- Cautions/Laps: 5 for 21 laps
- Red flags: 1
- Time of race: 1 hour, 5 minutes and 1 second
- Average speed: 68.895 miles per hour (110.876 km/h)

== Standings after the race ==
Drivers' Championship standings

| | Pos | Driver | Points |
|---|---|---|---|
| | 1 | Trevor Huddleston | 313 |
| | 2 | Mason Massey | 289 (–24) |
| 3 | 3 | Cole Denton | 274 (–39) |
| 1 | 4 | Robbie Kennealy | 272 (–41) |
| 1 | 5 | Hailie Deegan | 262 (–51) |
| 1 | 6 | Eric Johnson Jr. | 257 (–56) |
| | 7 | Andrew Chapman | 250 (–63) |
| 1 | 8 | Mia Lovell | 246 (–67) |
| 1 | 9 | Gavin Ray | 242 (–71) |
| | 10 | David Smith | 216 (–97) |

- Note: Only the first 10 positions are included for the driver standings.

| Previous race: 2026 Legendary Billy Green 150 | ARCA Menards Series West; 2026 season | Next race: 2026 General Tire 150 (Sonoma) |
