= 2026 General Tire 150 (Sonoma) =

ARCA Menards Series West race at Sonoma Raceway

Race details
- Race 7 of 13 in the 2026 ARCA Menards Series West
- Date: June 26, 2026
- Location: Sonoma Raceway in Sonoma, California
- Course: Permanent racing facility
- Course length: 1.99 miles (3.20 km)
- Distance: 47 laps, 93.53 mi (150.522 km)
- Average speed: 72.723 miles per hour (117.036 km/h)

Pole position
Driver	Sam Corry	Nitro Motorsports
- Time: 1:17.193

Most laps led
Driver	Sam Corry	Nitro Motorsports
- Laps: 47

Fastest lap
Driver	Sam Corry	Nitro Motorsports
- Time: 1:18.246

Winner
No. 25	Sam Corry	Nitro Motorsports

Television in the United States
- Network: FloRacing; NASCAR Channel
- Announcers: Charles Krall

Radio in the United States
- Radio: ARN

The 2026 General Tire 150 was an ARCA Menards Series West race held on Friday, June 26, 2026, at Sonoma Raceway in Sonoma, California. Contested over 47 laps on the 1.99-mile (3.20 km) asphalt road course, it was the seventh race of the 2026 ARCA Menards Series West season, and the 20th running of the event.

Sam Corry, driving for Nitro Motorsports, pulled off a dominating performance, leading every lap from the pole position to earn his first career ARCA Menards Series West win. Mia Lovell finished second, and Eric Johnson Jr. finished third. Cole Denton and Patrick Staropoli rounded out the top five, while Todd Souza, Robbie Kennealy, Jeff Anton, Trevor Huddleston, and Gavin Ray rounded out the top ten.

== Report ==
=== Background ===
Layout of Sonoma Raceway, the track where the race was held.

Sonoma Raceway is a 1.99-mile (3.20 km) road course and drag strip located on the landform known as Sears Point in the southern Sonoma Mountains in Sonoma, California, U.S. The road course features 12 turns on a hilly course with 160 feet (49 m) of total elevation change. It is host to one of only seven NASCAR Cup Series races each year that are run on road courses. It is also host to the NTT IndyCar Series and several other auto races and motorcycle races such as the American Federation of Motorcyclists series. Sonoma Raceway continues to host amateur, or club racing events which may or may not be open to the general public. The largest such car club is the Sports Car Club of America. In 2022, the race was reverted to racing the club configuration.

==== Entry list ====
- (R) denotes rookie driver.

#	Driver	Team	Make
1	Robbie Kennealy	Jan's Towing Racing	Ford
4	Eric Nascimento	Nascimento Motorsports	Toyota
05	David Smith	Shockwave Motorsports	Toyota
5	Eric Johnson Jr.	Jerry Pitts Racing	Toyota
7	Gavin Ray (R)	Jerry Pitts Racing	Ford
13	Todd Souza	Central Coast Racing	Ford
15	Mia Lovell (R)	Nitro Motorsports	Toyota
16	Hailie Deegan	Bill McAnally Racing	Chevrolet
17	Taylor Mayhew	Cook Racing Technologies	Chevrolet
19	Mason Massey	Bill McAnally Racing	Chevrolet
20	Patrick Staropoli	Bill McAnally Racing	Chevrolet
25	Sam Corry	Nitro Motorsports	Toyota
44	Jeff Anton	Anton Racing	Chevrolet
50	Trevor Huddleston	High Point Racing	Ford
51	Tyler Tomassi	Strike Mamba Racing	Chevrolet
52	Ryan Philpott	Philpott Race Cars	Toyota
55	Andrew Chapman (R)	High Point Racing	Ford
68	Rodd Kneeland	Rodd Racing	Ford
71	Cole Denton (R)	Jan's Towing Racing	Ford
72	Sage Karam	Strike Mamba Racing	Chevrolet
77	Dave Smith	Performance P-1 Motorsports	Toyota
86	Tim Spurgeon	Spurgeon Motorsports	Chevrolet
Official entry list

== Practice ==
The first and only practice session was held on Friday, June 26, at 10:40 AM PST, and lasted for 1 hour and 15 minutes.

Sam Corry, driving for Nitro Motorsports, set the fastest time in the session with a lap of 1:17.990 seconds, and a speed of 91.858 miles per hour (147.831 km/h).

Pos.	#	Driver	Team	Make	Time	Speed
1	25	Sam Corry	Nitro Motorsports	Toyota	1:17.990	91.858
2	15	Mia Lovell (R)	Nitro Motorsports	Toyota	1:18.670	91.064
3	20	Patrick Staropoli	Bill McAnally Racing	Chevrolet	1:19.152	90.509
Full practice results

== Qualifying ==
Qualifying was held on Friday, June 26, at 12:10 PM PST. The qualifying system used was a multi-car, multi-lap based system. All drivers were on track for a 20-minute timed session, and whoever set the fastest time in that session won the pole.

Sam Corry, driving for Nitro Motorsports, qualified on pole position with a lap of 1:17.193 seconds, and a speed of 92.806 miles per hour (149.357 km/h).

=== Qualifying results ===
Pos.	#	Driver	Team	Make	Time	Speed
1	25	Sam Corry	Nitro Motorsports	Toyota	1:17.193	92.806
2	15	Mia Lovell (R)	Nitro Motorsports	Toyota	1:17.465	92.480
3	5	Eric Johnson Jr.	Jerry Pitts Racing	Toyota	1:18.529	91.227
4	19	Mason Massey	Bill McAnally Racing	Chevrolet	1:18.942	90.750
5	71	Cole Denton (R)	Jan's Towing Racing	Ford	1:19.327	90.310
6	20	Patrick Staropoli	Bill McAnally Racing	Chevrolet	1:19.498	90.115
7	1	Robbie Kennealy	Jan's Towing Racing	Ford	1:19.564	90.041
8	13	Todd Souza	Central Coast Racing	Ford	1:19.639	89.956
9	7	Gavin Ray (R)	Jerry Pitts Racing	Ford	1:20.133	89.401
10	50	Trevor Huddleston	High Point Racing	Ford	1:20.744	88.725
11	17	Taylor Mayhew	Cook Racing Technologies	Chevrolet	1:20.840	88.619
12	52	Ryan Philpott	Philpott Race Cars	Toyota	1:20.944	88.506
13	44	Jeff Anton	Anton Racing	Chevrolet	1:21.098	88.338
14	55	Andrew Chapman (R)	High Point Racing	Ford	1:21.448	87.958
15	86	Tim Spurgeon	Spurgeon Motorsports	Chevrolet	1:22.083	87.278
16	51	Tyler Tomassi	Strike Mamba Racing	Chevrolet	1:22.400	86.942
17	72	Sage Karam	Strike Mamba Racing	Chevrolet	1:22.573	86.760
18	68	Rodd Kneeland	Rodd Racing	Ford	1:25.918	83.382
19	05	David Smith	Shockwave Motorsports	Toyota	1:27.408	81.960
20	16	Hailie Deegan	Bill McAnally Racing	Chevrolet	—	—
21	77	Dave Smith	Performance P-1 Motorsports	Toyota	—	—
22	4	Eric Nascimento	Nascimento Motorsports	Toyota	—	—
Official qualifying results

== Race ==
=== Race results ===
Laps: 47

Fin	St	#	Driver	Team	Make	Laps	Led	Status	Pts
1	1	25	Sam Corry	Nitro Motorsports	Toyota	47	47	Running	49
2	2	15	Mia Lovell (R)	Nitro Motorsports	Toyota	47	0	Running	42
3	3	5	Eric Johnson Jr.	Jerry Pitts Racing	Toyota	47	0	Running	41
4	5	71	Cole Denton (R)	Jan's Towing Racing	Ford	47	0	Running	40
5	6	20	Patrick Staropoli	Bill McAnally Racing	Chevrolet	47	0	Running	39
6	8	13	Todd Souza	Central Coast Racing	Ford	47	0	Running	38
7	7	1	Robbie Kennealy	Jan's Towing Racing	Ford	47	0	Running	37
8	13	44	Jeff Anton	Anton Racing	Chevrolet	47	0	Running	36
9	10	50	Trevor Huddleston	High Point Racing	Ford	47	0	Running	35
10	9	7	Gavin Ray (R)	Jerry Pitts Racing	Ford	47	0	Running	34
11	12	52	Ryan Philpott	Philpott Race Cars	Toyota	47	0	Running	33
12	11	17	Taylor Mayhew	Cook Racing Technologies	Chevrolet	47	0	Running	32
13	17	72	Sage Karam	Strike Mamba Racing	Chevrolet	47	0	Running	31
14	14	55	Andrew Chapman (R)	High Point Racing	Ford	47	0	Running	30
15	15	86	Tim Spurgeon	Spurgeon Motorsports	Chevrolet	47	0	Running	29
16	16	51	Tyler Tomassi	Strike Mamba Racing	Chevrolet	46	0	Accident	28
17	19	05	David Smith	Shockwave Motorsports	Toyota	44	0	Running	27
18	18	68	Rodd Kneeland	Rodd Racing	Ford	41	0	Running	26
19	4	19	Mason Massey	Bill McAnally Racing	Chevrolet	35	0	Running	25
20	20	16	Hailie Deegan	Bill McAnally Racing	Chevrolet	29	0	Mechanical	24
21	22	4	Eric Nascimento	Nascimento Motorsports	Toyota	8	0	Mechanical	23
22	21	77	Dave Smith	Performance P-1 Motorsports	Toyota	0	0	Did Not Start	22
Official race results

=== Race statistics ===
- Lead changes: 1 among 1 different driver
- Cautions/Laps: 4 for 14 laps
- Red flags: 0
- Time of race: 1 hour, 17 minutes and 1 second
- Average speed: 72.723 miles per hour (117.036 km/h)

== Standings after the race ==
Drivers' Championship standings

	Pos	Driver	Points
	1	Trevor Huddleston	348
1	2	Cole Denton	314 (–34)
1	3	Mason Massey	314 (–34)
	4	Robbie Kennealy	309 (–39)
1	5	Eric Johnson Jr.	298 (–50)
2	6	Mia Lovell	288 (–60)
2	7	Hailie Deegan	286 (–62)
1	8	Andrew Chapman	280 (–68)
	9	Gavin Ray	276 (–72)
	10	David Smith	243 (–105)

- Note: Only the first 10 positions are included for the driver standings.

Previous race: 2026 NAPA Auto Care 150 Greg Biffle Memorial	ARCA Menards Series West; 2026 season	Next race: 2026 Portland 112
