= 2026 Legendary Billy Green 150 =

ARCA Menards Series West race at Colorado National Speedway

2026 Legendary Billy Green 150 presented by NAPA Auto Parts
Race details
- Race 5 of 13 in the 2026 ARCA Menards Series West
- Date: May 23, 2026
- Location: Colorado National Speedway in Dacono, Colorado
- Course: Permanent racing facility
- Course length: 0.375 miles (0.604 km)
- Distance: 150 laps, 56.25 mi (90.52 km)
- Scheduled distance: 150 laps, 56.25 mi (90.52 km)
- Average speed: 61.800 miles per hour (99.457 km/h)

Pole position
Driver	Robbie Kennealy	Jan's Towing Racing
- Time: 16.948

Most laps led
Driver	Trevor Huddleston	High Point Racing
- Laps: 127

Winner
No. 50	Trevor Huddleston	High Point Racing

Television in the United States
- Network: FloRacing
- Announcers: Charles Krall

Radio in the United States
- Radio: ARN

The 2026 Legendary Billy Green 150 presented by NAPA Auto Parts was an ARCA Menards Series West race held on Saturday, May 23, 2026, at Colorado National Speedway in Dacono, Colorado. Contested over 150 laps on the 0.375 miles (0.604 km) short track, it was the fifth race of the 2026 ARCA Menards Series West season, and the second running of the event.

Trevor Huddleston, driving for High Point Racing, pulled off another dominating performance, leading a race-high 127 laps from the second position to earn his 11th career ARCA Menards Series West win, and his second of the season. Robbie Kennealy finished second, and Cade Fox finished third. Mason Massey and Kyle Keller rounded out the top five, while Mia Lovell, Hailie Deegan, Cole Denton, Gavin Ray, and Andrew Chapman rounded out the top ten.

== Report ==
=== Background ===
Colorado National Speedway is a paved oval in Dacono, Colorado, spanning 0.375 mi (0.604 km). The track is currently a member of the NASCAR Advance Auto Parts Weekly Series and hosts the ARCA Menards Series West (former NASCAR K&N Pro Series West), the King of the Wing Sprint Car Series, and the North American Big Rig Racing Series annually.

Founded in 1965 by Gene and Gerda Heffley, Colorado National Speedway sits at the foot of the Rocky Mountains at exit 232 off of I-25. Each summer, CNS hosts some of the best local racing in the country; along with several national touring series, car and motorcycle shows, swap meets, and an annual Father's Day Sunday Super Show featuring Monster Trucks, Stunt Bikes, and more. The Speedway opens for practice in April, racing begins in May, and events run through October. CNS is known locally for outstanding food, affordable tickets, and Northern Colorado's best fireworks display on holiday and special race events.

==== Entry list ====
- (R) denotes rookie driver.

#	Driver	Team	Make
1	Robbie Kennealy	Jan's Towing Racing	Ford
4	Kyle Keller	Nascimento Motorsports	Chevrolet
05	David Smith	Shockwave Motorsports	Toyota
5	Eric Johnson Jr.	Jerry Pitts Racing	Toyota
7	Gavin Ray (R)	Jerry Pitts Racing	Toyota
15	Mia Lovell (R)	Nitro Motorsports	Toyota
16	Hailie Deegan	Bill McAnally Racing	Chevrolet
19	Mason Massey	Bill McAnally Racing	Chevrolet
25	Will Robinson	Nitro Motorsports	Toyota
50	Trevor Huddleston	High Point Racing	Ford
51	Scotty Milan	Strike Mamba Racing	Chevrolet
55	Andrew Chapman (R)	High Point Racing	Ford
66	Cade Fox	66 Rhead Racing	Chevrolet
71	Cole Denton (R)	Jan's Towing Racing	Ford
72	Tyler Tomassi	Strike Mamba Racing	Chevrolet
77	Alonso Salinas	Performance P-1 Motorsports	Toyota
Official entry list

== Practice ==
The first and only practice session was held on Saturday, May 23, at 4:00 PM MST, and lasted for 1 hour.

Trevor Huddleston, driving for High Point Racing, set the fastest time in the session, with a lap of 17.242 seconds, and a speed of 78.297 miles per hour (126.007 km/h).

=== Practice results ===
Pos.	#	Driver	Team	Make	Time	Speed
1	50	Trevor Huddleston	High Point Racing	Ford	17.242	78.297
2	1	Robbie Kennealy	Jan's Towing Racing	Ford	17.243	78.293
3	4	Kyle Keller	Nascimento Motorsports	Chevrolet	17.285	78.102
Full practice results

== Qualifying ==
Qualifying was held on Saturday, May 23, at 6:00 PM MST. The qualifying procedure used was a single-car, two-lap based system. Drivers were on track by themselves and had two laps to post a qualifying time, and whoever set the fastest time won the pole.

Robbie Kennealy, driving for Jan's Towing Racing, qualified on pole position with a lap of 16.948 seconds, and a speed of 79.655 miles per hour (128.192 km/h).

=== Qualifying results ===
Pos.	#	Driver	Team	Make	Time	Speed
1	1	Robbie Kennealy	Jan's Towing Racing	Ford	16.948	79.655
2	50	Trevor Huddleston	High Point Racing	Ford	17.012	79.356
3	16	Hailie Deegan	Bill McAnally Racing	Chevrolet	17.053	79.165
4	4	Kyle Keller	Nascimento Motorsports	Chevrolet	17.055	79.156
5	71	Cole Denton (R)	Jan's Towing Racing	Ford	17.072	79.077
6	66	Cade Fox	66 Rhead Racing	Chevrolet	17.076	79.058
7	19	Mason Massey	Bill McAnally Racing	Chevrolet	17.093	78.980
8	55	Andrew Chapman (R)	High Point Racing	Ford	17.217	78.411
9	7	Gavin Ray (R)	Jerry Pitts Racing	Toyota	17.303	78.021
10	25	Will Robinson	Nitro Motorsports	Toyota	17.353	77.796
11	5	Eric Johnson Jr.	Jerry Pitts Racing	Toyota	17.379	77.680
12	51	Scotty Milan	Strike Mamba Racing	Chevrolet	17.443	77.395
13	05	David Smith	Shockwave Motorsports	Toyota	17.540	76.967
14	77	Alonso Salinas	Performance P-1 Motorsports	Toyota	17.585	76.770
15	72	Tyler Tomassi	Strike Mamba Racing	Chevrolet	17.692	76.306
16	15	Mia Lovell (R)	Nitro Motorsports	Toyota	—	—
Official qualifying results

== Race ==
=== Race results ===
Laps: 150

Fin	St	#	Driver	Team	Make	Laps	Led	Status	Pts
1	2	50	Trevor Huddleston	High Point Racing	Ford	150	127	Running	98
2	1	1	Robbie Kennealy	Jan's Towing Racing	Ford	150	23	Running	94
3	6	66	Cade Fox	66 Rhead Racing	Chevrolet	150	0	Running	41
4	7	19	Mason Massey	Bill McAnally Racing	Chevrolet	150	0	Running	90
5	4	4	Kyle Keller	Nascimento Motorsports	Chevrolet	150	0	Running	39
6	16	15	Mia Lovell (R)	Nitro Motorsports	Toyota	150	0	Running	88
7	3	16	Hailie Deegan	Bill McAnally Racing	Chevrolet	149	0	Running	87
8	5	71	Cole Denton (R)	Jan's Towing Racing	Ford	149	0	Running	86
9	9	7	Gavin Ray (R)	Jerry Pitts Racing	Toyota	149	0	Running	85
10	8	55	Andrew Chapman (R)	High Point Racing	Ford	148	0	Running	84
11	11	5	Eric Johnson Jr.	Jerry Pitts Racing	Toyota	148	0	Running	83
12	14	77	Alonso Salinas	Performance P-1 Motorsports	Toyota	148	0	Running	32
13	10	25	Will Robinson	Nitro Motorsports	Toyota	147	0	Running	31
14	15	72	Tyler Tomassi	Strike Mamba Racing	Chevrolet	146	0	Running	30
15	12	51	Scotty Milan	Strike Mamba Racing	Chevrolet	145	0	Running	29
16	13	05	David Smith	Shockwave Motorsports	Toyota	142	0	Running	78
Official race results

=== Race statistics ===
- Lead changes: 1 among 2 different drivers
- Cautions/Laps: 2 for 14 laps
- Red flags: 0
- Time of race: 53 minutes and 53 seconds
- Average speed: 61.800 miles per hour (99.457 km/h)

== Standings after the race ==
Drivers' Championship standings

	Pos	Driver	Points
	1	Trevor Huddleston	270
	2	Mason Massey	250 (–20)
3	3	Robbie Kennealy	232 (–38)
1	4	Hailie Deegan	232 (–38)
	5	Eric Johnson Jr.	226 (–44)
	6	Cole Denton	225 (–45)
	7	Andrew Chapman	214 (–56)
	8	Gavin Ray	205 (–65)
	9	Mia Lovell	205 (–65)
	10	David Smith	184 (–86)

- Note: Only the first 10 positions are included for the driver standings.

Previous race: 2026 Bill Schmitt Memorial 173	ARCA Menards Series West; 2026 season	Next race: 2026 NAPA Auto Care 150 Greg Biffle Memorial
