= 2026 Tucson ARCA Menards West 150 =

ARCA Menards Series West race at Tucson Speedway

Race details
- Race 3 of 13 in the 2026 ARCA Menards Series West
- Date: April 11, 2026
- Location: Tucson Speedway in Tucson, Arizona
- Course: Permanent racing facility
- Course length: 0.375 miles (0.604 km)
- Distance: 150 laps, 56.25 mi (90.52 km)
- Average speed: 65.768 miles per hour (105.843 km/h)

Pole position
Driver	Cole Denton	Jan's Towing Racing
- Time: 15.950

Most laps led
Driver	Cole Denton	Jan's Towing Racing
- Laps: 127

Winner
No. 71	Cole Denton	Jan's Towing Racing

Television in the United States
- Network: FloRacing
- Announcers: Charles Krall

Radio in the United States
- Radio: ARN

The 2026 Tucson ARCA Menards West 150 was an ARCA Menards Series West race held on Saturday, April 11, 2026, at Tucson Speedway in Tucson, Arizona. Contested over 150 laps on the 0.375 miles (0.604 km) short track, it was the third race of the 2026 ARCA Menards Series West season, and the second running of the event.

In a large tire conservation race, Cole Denton, driving for Jan's Towing Racing, held off a fast charging Trevor Huddleston in the final few laps to earn his first career ARCA Menards Series West win in his third career start. Denton had also dominated the event, leading race-high 127 laps from the pole position. Huddleston finished second, and Eric Johnson Jr. finished third. Robbie Kennealy and Gavin Ray rounded out the top five, while Eric Rhead, Hailie Deegan, Mia Lovell, Memphis Villarreal, and Julian DaCosta rounded out the top ten.

== Report ==
=== Background ===
Tucson Speedway is a 0.375 mi (0.604 km) paved oval racetrack located at the Pima County Fairgrounds, off Interstate 10 just south of Tucson, Arizona. It is one of only three paved ovals in the state of Arizona (the others are Phoenix Raceway and Havasu 95 Speedway).

The track was built in 1967 as the Corona Speedway. The original track layout was a dirt/clay half mile oval, with an infield quarter mile track that connected via the frontstraightaway. Bob Frakes would take over as the operator until passing the torch to Calvin Renard in 1983. The track would close in the winter of 1983 before B.O.P. Incorporated would take the lease and operate the track until 1986.

In 1987, dirt racer Dan Manes and his wife Linda would take over the track, reconfiguring it into a 0.375 mi (0.604 km) oval and renaming the facility "Raven Raceway".

In 1990, a subsidiary of International Speedway Corporation, Great Western Sports, would purchase the lease and take over from the Manes family, also renaming the track for a second time as "Tucson Raceway Park".

==== Entry list ====
- (R) denotes rookie driver.

#	Driver	Team	Make
1	Robbie Kennealy	Jan's Towing Racing	Ford
05	David Smith	Shockwave Motorsports	Toyota
5	Eric Johnson Jr.	Jerry Pitts Racing	Toyota
7	Gavin Ray (R)	Jerry Pitts Racing	Toyota
13	Jade Avedisian	Central Coast Racing	Toyota
15	Mia Lovell (R)	Nitro Motorsports	Toyota
16	Hailie Deegan	Bill McAnally Racing	Chevrolet
19	Mason Massey	Bill McAnally Racing	Chevrolet
25	Julian DaCosta (R)	Nitro Motorsports	Toyota
50	Trevor Huddleston	High Point Racing	Ford
51	Tyler Tomassi	Strike Mamba Racing	Chevrolet
55	Andrew Chapman (R)	High Point Racing	Ford
66	Eric Rhead	66 Rhead Racing	Chevrolet
70	Will Robinson	Nitro Motorsports	Toyota
71	Cole Denton (R)	Jan's Towing Racing	Ford
72	Memphis Villarreal	Strike Mamba Racing	Chevrolet
77	Quinn Davis	Performance P-1 Motorsports	Toyota
Official entry list

== Practice ==
The first and only practice session was held on Saturday, April 11, at 2:00 PM MST, and lasted for 1 hour.

Trevor Huddleston, driving for High Point Racing, set the fastest time in the session, with a lap of 16.256 seconds, and a speed of 83.046 miles per hour (133.650 km/h).

=== Practice results ===
Pos.	#	Driver	Team	Make	Time	Speed
1	50	Trevor Huddleston	High Point Racing	Ford	16.256	83.046
2	16	Hailie Deegan	Bill McAnally Racing	Chevrolet	16.390	82.367
3	71	Cole Denton (R)	Jan's Towing Racing	Ford	16.409	82.272
Full practice results

== Qualifying ==
Qualifying was held on Saturday, April 11, at 5:00 PM MST. The qualifying procedure used was a single-car, two-lap based system. Drivers were on track by themselves and had two laps to post a qualifying time, and whoever set the fastest time won the pole.

Cole Denton, driving for Jan's Towing Racing, qualified on pole position with a lap of 15.950 seconds, and a speed of 84.639 miles per hour (136.213 km/h).

=== Qualifying results ===
Pos.	#	Driver	Team	Make	Time	Speed
1	71	Cole Denton (R)	Jan's Towing Racing	Ford	15.950	84.639
2	50	Trevor Huddleston	High Point Racing	Ford	16.106	83.820
3	19	Mason Massey	Bill McAnally Racing	Chevrolet	16.148	83.602
4	13	Jade Avedisian	Central Coast Racing	Toyota	16.178	83.447
5	1	Robbie Kennealy	Jan's Towing Racing	Ford	16.220	83.231
6	16	Hailie Deegan	Bill McAnally Racing	Chevrolet	16.230	83.179
7	51	Tyler Tomassi	Strike Mamba Racing	Chevrolet	16.283	82.909
8	15	Mia Lovell (R)	Nitro Motorsports	Toyota	16.348	82.579
9	25	Julian DaCosta (R)	Nitro Motorsports	Toyota	16.424	82.197
10	7	Gavin Ray (R)	Jerry Pitts Racing	Toyota	16.450	82.067
11	72	Memphis Villarreal	Strike Mamba Racing	Chevrolet	16.452	82.057
12	5	Eric Johnson Jr.	Jerry Pitts Racing	Toyota	16.454	82.047
13	70	Will Robinson	Nitro Motorsports	Toyota	16.524	81.699
14	55	Andrew Chapman (R)	High Point Racing	Ford	16.526	81.689
15	77	Quinn Davis	Performance P-1 Motorsports	Toyota	16.527	81.685
16	66	Eric Rhead	66 Rhead Racing	Chevrolet	16.773	80.486
17	05	David Smith	Shockwave Motorsports	Toyota	17.147	78.731
Official qualifying results

== Race ==
=== Race results ===
Laps: 150

Fin	St	#	Driver	Team	Make	Laps	Led	Status	Pts
1	1	71	Cole Denton (R)	Jan's Towing Racing	Ford	150	127	Running	49
2	2	50	Trevor Huddleston	High Point Racing	Ford	150	1	Running	43
3	12	5	Eric Johnson Jr.	Jerry Pitts Racing	Toyota	150	0	Running	41
4	5	1	Robbie Kennealy	Jan's Towing Racing	Ford	150	3	Running	41
5	10	7	Gavin Ray (R)	Jerry Pitts Racing	Toyota	150	0	Running	39
6	16	66	Eric Rhead	66 Rhead Racing	Chevrolet	150	0	Running	38
7	6	16	Hailie Deegan	Bill McAnally Racing	Chevrolet	150	0	Running	37
8	8	15	Mia Lovell (R)	Nitro Motorsports	Toyota	150	0	Running	36
9	11	72	Memphis Villarreal	Strike Mamba Racing	Chevrolet	150	0	Running	35
10	9	25	Julian DaCosta (R)	Nitro Motorsports	Toyota	150	0	Running	34
11	14	55	Andrew Chapman (R)	High Point Racing	Ford	150	0	Running	33
12	3	19	Mason Massey	Bill McAnally Racing	Chevrolet	150	0	Running	32
13	15	77	Quinn Davis	Performance P-1 Motorsports	Toyota	149	0	Running	31
14	7	51	Tyler Tomassi	Strike Mamba Racing	Chevrolet	148	0	Running	30
15	17	05	David Smith	Shockwave Motorsports	Toyota	147	19	Running	30
16	13	70	Will Robinson	Nitro Motorsports	Toyota	128	0	Running	28
17	4	13	Jade Avedisian	Central Coast Racing	Toyota	61	0	Flat Tire	27
Official race results

=== Race statistics ===
- Lead changes: 8 among 4 different drivers
- Cautions/Laps: 2 for 11 laps
- Red flags: 0
- Time of race: 51 minutes and 19 seconds
- Average speed: 65.768 miles per hour (105.843 km/h)

== Standings after the race ==
Drivers' Championship standings

	Pos	Driver	Points
1	1	Trevor Huddleston	123
1	2	Mason Massey	118 (–5)
1	3	Hailie Deegan	108 (–15)
1	4	Eric Johnson Jr.	105 (–18)
5	5	Cole Denton	103 (–20)
1	6	Robbie Kennealy	99 (–24)
1	7	Andrew Chapman	90 (–33)
4	8	Gavin Ray	89 (–34)
5	9	Mia Lovell	82 (–41)
1	10	Jade Avedisian	80 (–43)

- Note: Only the first 10 positions are included for the driver standings.

Previous race: 2026 General Tire 150	ARCA Menards Series West; 2026 season	Next race: 2026 Bill Schmitt Memorial 173
