= Hettinger Racing =

NASCAR team

- Owner(s): Katie Hettinger; Chris Hettinger
- Series: CARS Late Model Stock Tour
- Race drivers: CARS Late Model Stock Car Tour: 5. Chase Burrow; 51. Kasey Kleyn, Shane van Gisbergen; CARS Pro Late Model Tour: 5. James Seeright
- Manufacturer: Ford
- Opened: 2024

Career
- Debut: O'Reilly Auto Parts Series: 2026 United Rentals 300 (Daytona); Truck Series: 2024 Zip Buy Now, Pay Later 200 (Martinsville); ARCA Menards Series: 2024 Bush's Beans 200 (Bristol); ARCA Menards Series East: 2024 Bush's Beans 200 (Bristol)
- Latest race: O'Reilly Auto Parts Series: 2026 North Carolina Education Lottery 250 (Rockingham); Truck Series: 2025 Fresh From Florida 250 (Daytona); ARCA Menards Series: 2024 Bush's Beans 200 (Bristol); ARCA Menards Series East: 2025 Pensacola 150 (Pensacola)
- Races competed: Total: 16; O'Reilly Auto Parts Series: 10; Truck Series: 3 ARCA Menards Series: 1 ARCA Menards Series East: 2
- Drivers' Championships: Total: 0 O'Reilly Auto Parts Series: 0 Truck Series: 0 ARCA Menards Series: 0 ARCA Menards Series East: 0
- Race victories: Total: 0 O'Reilly Auto Parts Series: 0 Truck Series: 0 ARCA Menards Series: 0 ARCA Menards Series East: 0
- Pole positions: Total: 0 O'Reilly Auto Parts Series: 0 Truck Series: 0 ARCA Menards Series: 0 ARCA Menards Series East: 0

Hettinger Racing is an American professional stock car racing team that currently competes in the CARS Late Model Stock Car Tour fielding the No. 5 for Chase Burrow and No. 51 for Kasey Kleyn and Shane van Gisbergen. The team formerly competed in the NASCAR Craftsman Truck Series and NASCAR O'Reilly Auto Parts Series

== History ==
Hettinger Racing formed from the defunct NASCAR Craftsman Truck Series team Bret Holmes Racing. The team to made their debut at Martinsville with Brett Moffitt driving the truck.

== O'Reilly Auto Parts Series ==
=== Car No. 5 history ===
On December 23, 2025, Hettinger Racing announced they are fielding the No. 5 car full-time starting in the 2026 season. At the time of the announcement, no driver was announced, but Joe Williams Jr. was announced as the crew chief. On January 27, 2026, it was announced that Luke Fenhaus will attempt to make his debut in the NASCAR O'Reilly Auto Parts Series at Daytona International Speedway, driving the No. 5. Tyler Gonzalez would drive the No. 5 at Circuit of the Americas. However, he failed to qualify for the race. Chandler Smith would drive the No. 5 at Phoenix and Las Vegas. J. J. Yeley would drive the No. 5 at Darlington, and later at Rockingham. On March 23, 2026, it was announced that Luke Baldwin will attempt to make his debut in the NASCAR O'Reilly Auto Parts Series at Martinsville, driving the No. 5 Ford.

==== Car No. 5 results ====
Year	Driver	No.	Make	1	2	3	4	5	6	7	8	9	10	11	12	13	14	15	16	17	18	19	20	21	22	23	24	25	26	27	28	29	30	31	32	33	Owners	Pts
2026	Luke Fenhaus	5	Ford	DAY; 23	ATL; 20																																	
2026	Tyler Gonzalez	5	Ford			COA; DNQ																																
2026	Chandler Smith	5	Ford				PHO; 21	LVS; 36																														
2026	J. J. Yeley	5	Ford						DAR; 25		CAR; 20	BRI; 26		TAL; 11	TEX	GLN	DOV	CLT	NSH	POC	COR	SON	CHI	ATL	IND	IOW	DAY	DAR	GTW	BRI	LVS	CLT	PHO	TAL	MAR	HOM		
2026	Luke Baldwin	5	Ford							MAR; 38			KAN; 35																									

== Craftsman Truck Series ==
=== Truck No. 4 history ===
The team purchased the owner points from the Bret Holmes Racing No. 32 truck, renumbering it to the No. 4. It was later announced that Brett Moffitt would be the driver for the truck for the last two races of the 2024 season. On February 10, 2025, it was announced that Mason Maggio would drive the truck at the season-opener at Daytona.

==== Truck No. 4 results ====
Year	Driver	No.	Make	1	2	3	4	5	6	7	8	9	10	11	12	13	14	15	16	17	18	19	20	21	22	23	24	25	Owners	Pts
2024	Brett Moffitt	4	Chevy	DAY	ATL	LVS	BRI	COA	MAR	TEX	KAN	DAR	NWS	CLT	GTW	NSH	POC	IRP	RCH	MLW	BRI	KAN	TAL	HOM	MAR; 30	PHO; 16			23rd	388
2025	Mason Maggio	4	Chevy	DAY; 15	ATL	LVS	HOM	MAR	BRI	CAR	TEX	KAN	NWS	CLT	NSH	MCH	POC	LRP	IRP	GLN	RCH	DAR	BRI	NHA	ROV	TAL	MAR	PHO	43rd	22

== ARCA Menards Series ==
=== Car No. 71 history ===
On September 16, 2024, it was announced that the team would make their debut in the ARCA Menards Series and ARCA Menards Series East combination race at Bristol Motor Speedway, with Dawson Sutton driving the No. 71 Chevrolet, with Mardy Lindley serving as the crew chief, and with Rackley Roofing as the sponsor. Sutton finished 33rd after suffering a crash a handful of laps into the race.

==== Car No. 71 results ====
Year	Driver	No.	Make	1	2	3	4	5	6	7	8	9	10	11	12	13	14	15	16	17	18	19	20	Owners	Pts
2024	Dawson Sutton	71	Chevy	DAY	PHO	TAL	DOV	KAN	CLT	IOW	MOH	BLN	IRP	SLM	ELK	MCH	ISF	MLW	DSF	GLN	BRI; 33	KAN	TOL	77th	11

== ARCA Menards Series East ==
=== Car No. 4 history ===
On March 18, 2025, it was announced that the team would make their second start in the ARCA Menards Series East for race at Five Flags Speedway, with Carson Brown driving the No. 4 Chevrolet.

==== Car No. 4 results ====
Year	Driver	No.	Make	1	2	3	4	5	6	7	8	Owners	Pts
2025	Carson Brown	4	Chevy	FIF; 6	CAR	NSH	FRS	DOV	IRP	IOW	BRI	41st	38

=== Car No. 71 history ===
On September 16, 2024, it was announced that the team would make their debut in the ARCA Menards Series and ARCA Menards Series East combination race at Bristol Motor Speedway, with Dawson Sutton driving the No. 71 Chevrolet. He finished 33rd after suffering a crash a handful of laps into the race.

==== Car No. 71 results ====
Year	Driver	No.	Make	1	2	3	4	5	6	7	8	Owners	Pts
2024	Dawson Sutton	71	Chevy	FIF	DOV	NSV	FRS	IOW	IRP	MLW	BRI; 33	42nd	11
