= Presley Sorah =

American racing driver

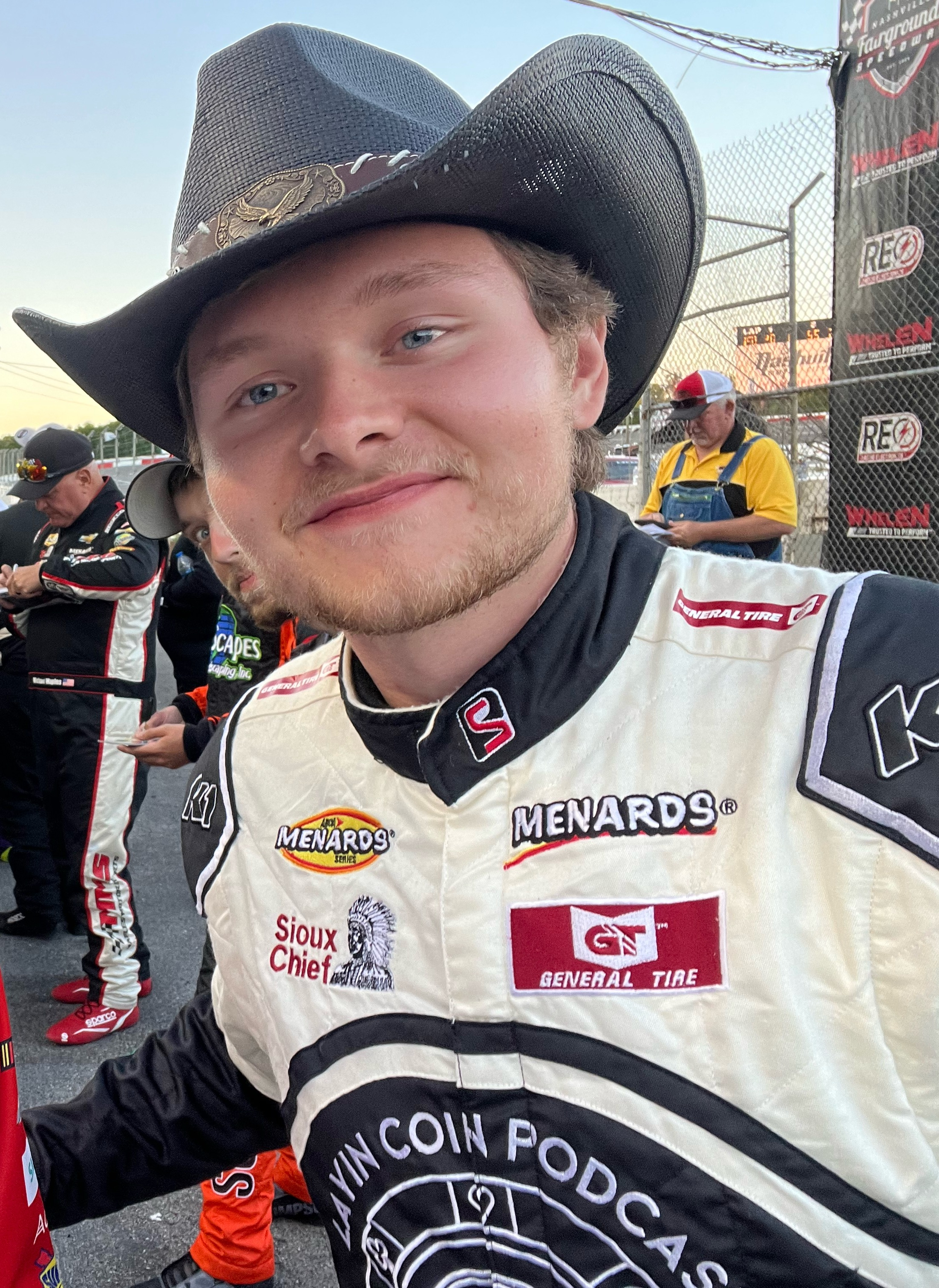
- Sorah at Nashville Fairgrounds Speedway in 2024
- Born: September 9, 2003 (age 23); Cambridge City, Indiana, U.S.

ARCA Menards Series career
- 7 races run over 3 years
- Best finish: 61st (2024)
- First race: 2024 Atlas 150 (Iowa)
- Last race: 2026 General Tire 200 (Daytona)
| Wins | Top tens | Poles |
|---|---|---|
| 0 | 0 | 0 |

ARCA Menards Series East career
- 5 races run over 2 years
- Best finish: 25th (2024)
- First race: 2024 Pensacola 150 (Pensacola)
- Last race: 2025 LiUNA! 150 (IRP)
| Wins | Top tens | Poles |
|---|---|---|
| 0 | 0 | 0 |
- Statistics up to date as of February 14, 2026.

Presley Sorah (born September 9, 2003) is an American professional stock car racing driver. He last competed part-time in the ARCA Menards Series, driving the No. 9 Ford for Fast Track Racing.

== Racing career ==
Sorah first started his racing career at the age of ten, driving go-karts.

In 2018, Sorah began participating in the eNASCAR Ignite Series on iRacing. He has most notably competed in the Monday Night Racing Pro Series, where he won the championship in his rookie season in 2022.

In 2023, Sorah competed in the CRA Late Model Sportsman Series and the Ultimate Heart of America Super Late Model Series, where he recorded a best finish of eighth in the former series at Salem Speedway.

In 2024, Sorah participated in the pre-season test for the ARCA Menards Series at Daytona International Speedway, driving the No. 06 Toyota for Wayne Peterson Racing, and placed 74th in the overall results between the two testing days. Two months later, it was announced that Sorah would make his debut in the ARCA Menards Series East at Five Flags Speedway, driving the No. 12 Toyota for Fast Track Racing. After placing thirteenth in the lone practice session, he qualified in fifteenth and finished in fourteenth due to electrical issues. He would return to the car again for the event at Nashville, and running a Darrell Waltrip throwback, would qualify 14th before finishing last in 18th with brake issues.

== Motorsports career results ==
=== ARCA Menards Series ===
(key) (Bold – Pole position awarded by qualifying time. Italics – Pole position earned by points standings or practice time. * – Most laps led. ** – All laps led.)

ARCA Menards Series results
| Year | Team | No. | Make | 1 | 2 | 3 | 4 | 5 | 6 | 7 | 8 | 9 | 10 | 11 | 12 | 13 | 14 | 15 | 16 | 17 | 18 | 19 | 20 | AMSC | Pts | Ref |
|---|---|---|---|---|---|---|---|---|---|---|---|---|---|---|---|---|---|---|---|---|---|---|---|---|---|---|
| 2024 | Clubb Racing Inc. | 86 | Ford | DAY | PHO | TAL | DOV | KAN | CLT | IOW; 25 | MOH | BLN | | | | | | | | | | | | 61st | 61 | |
| 2024 | Fast Track Racing | 12 | Toyota | | | | | | | | | | IRP; 29 | SLM | ELK | MCH | ISF | MLW | DSF | GLN | BRI | KAN | | 61st | 61 | |
| 2024 | Rise Motorsports | 31 | Chevy | | | | | | | | | | | | | | | | | | | | TOL; 17 | 61st | 61 | |
| 2025 | Fast Track Racing | 9 | Toyota | DAY | PHO | TAL | KAN; 21 | CLT | MCH | BLN | ELK | LRP | DOV | | | | | | | | | | | 74th | 59 | |
| 2025 | Maples Motorsports | 67 | Chevy | | | | | | | | | | | IRP; 28 | IOW | GLN | ISF | MAD | DSF | BRI | SLM | KAN | | 74th | 59 | |
| 2025 | Rise Motorsports | 31 | Toyota | | | | | | | | | | | | | | | | | | | | TOL; 24 | 74th | 59 | |
| 2026 | Fast Track Racing | 9 | Ford | DAY; 27 | PHO | KAN | TAL | GLN | TOL | MCH | POC | BER | ELK | CHI | LRP | IRP | IOW | ISF | MAD | DSF | SLM | BRI | KAN | 126th | 17 | |

==== ARCA Menards Series East ====
ARCA Menards Series East results
| Year | Team | No. | Make | 1 | 2 | 3 | 4 | 5 | 6 | 7 | 8 | AMSEC | Pts | Ref |
|---|---|---|---|---|---|---|---|---|---|---|---|---|---|---|
| 2024 | Fast Track Racing | 12 | Toyota | FIF; 14 | DOV | NSV; 18 | FRS | | IRP; 29 | MLW | BRI | 25th | 90 | |
| 2024 | Clubb Racing Inc. | 86 | Ford | | | | | IOW; 25 | | | | 25th | 90 | |
| 2025 | Maples Motorsports | 67 | Chevy | FIF | CAR | NSV | FRS | DOV | IRP; 28 | IOW | BRI | 72nd | 16 | |
