= Brian Clubb =

American racing driver (born 1965)

- Born: February 1, 1965 (age 61); Morris, Illinois, U.S.

ARCA Menards Series career
- 7 races run over 2 years
- Best finish: 43rd (2024)
- First race: 2024 Shore Lunch 250 (Elko)
- Last race: 2025 Shore Lunch 250 (Elko)
Wins	Top tens	Poles
0	0	0

ARCA Menards Series East career
- 2 races run over 1 year
- ARCA East no., team: No. 03 (Clubb Racing Inc.)
- Best finish: 48th (2024)
- First race: 2024 Sprecher 150 (Milwaukee)
- Last race: 2024 Bush's Beans 200 (Bristol)
Wins	Top tens	Poles
0	0	0
- Statistics up to date as of June 22, 2025.

Brian Clubb (born February 1, 1965) is an American professional stock car racing driver and crew chief. He last competed part-time in the ARCA Menards Series East, driving the No. 03 Ford for Clubb Racing Inc. He is the father of current ARCA Menards Series driver Alex Clubb.

== Racing career ==
Clubb has previously competed in the ARTGO Challenge Series, where he ran one race in 1997 at Grundy County Speedway. He finished fifth in the late model track championship at Grundy County Speedway in 2001.

In 2024, it was revealed that Clubb would make his debut in the ARCA Menards Series at Elko Speedway, driving the No. 86 Ford for Clubb Racing Inc. After setting the slowest time in the lone practice session, he qualified in twentieth, and finished seventeenth due to mechanical issues. He then made four more starts that year, including a start at Bristol Motor Speedway for CW Motorsports in a collaboration with CRI.

In 2025, Clubb ran two ARCA races for CRI in the No. 86, finishing 26th at Kansas Speedway after failing to take the start, and 20th at Elko Speedway due to fatigue.

In 2026, Clubb participated in the pre-season test at Daytona International Speedway for CRI, where he set the slowest time between the two sessions held.

== Motorsports career results ==
=== ARCA Menards Series ===
(key) (Bold – Pole position awarded by qualifying time. Italics – Pole position earned by points standings or practice time. * – Most laps led.)

ARCA Menards Series results
Year	Team	No.	Make	1	2	3	4	5	6	7	8	9	10	11	12	13	14	15	16	17	18	19	20	AMSC	Pts	Ref
2024	Clubb Racing Inc.	86	Ford	DAY	PHO	TAL	DOV	KAN	CLT	IOW	MOH	BLN	IRP	SLM	ELK; 17	MCH	ISF; 20	MLW; 24	DSF; 23	GLN				43rd	105	
2024	CW Motorsports	93	Ford																		BRI; 31	KAN	TOL	43rd	105	
2025	Clubb Racing Inc.	86	Ford	DAY	PHO	TAL	KAN; 26	CLT	MCH	BLN	ELK; 20	LRP; Wth	DOV	IRP	IOW	GLN	ISF	MAD	DSF	BRI	SLM	KAN	TOL	91st	42	

==== ARCA Menards Series East ====
ARCA Menards Series East results
Year	Team	No.	Make	1	2	3	4	5	6	7	8	AMSEC	Pts	Ref
2024	Clubb Racing Inc.	86	Ford	FIF	DOV	NSV	FRS	IOW	IRP	MLW; 24		48th	33	
2024	CW Motorsports	93	Ford								BRI; 31	48th	33	
2026	Clubb Racing Inc.	03	Ford	HCY	CAR	NSV; Wth	TOL	IRP	FRS	IOW	BRI	N/A	0	
