= 2024 ARCA Menards Series =

72nd season of the ARCA Menards Series

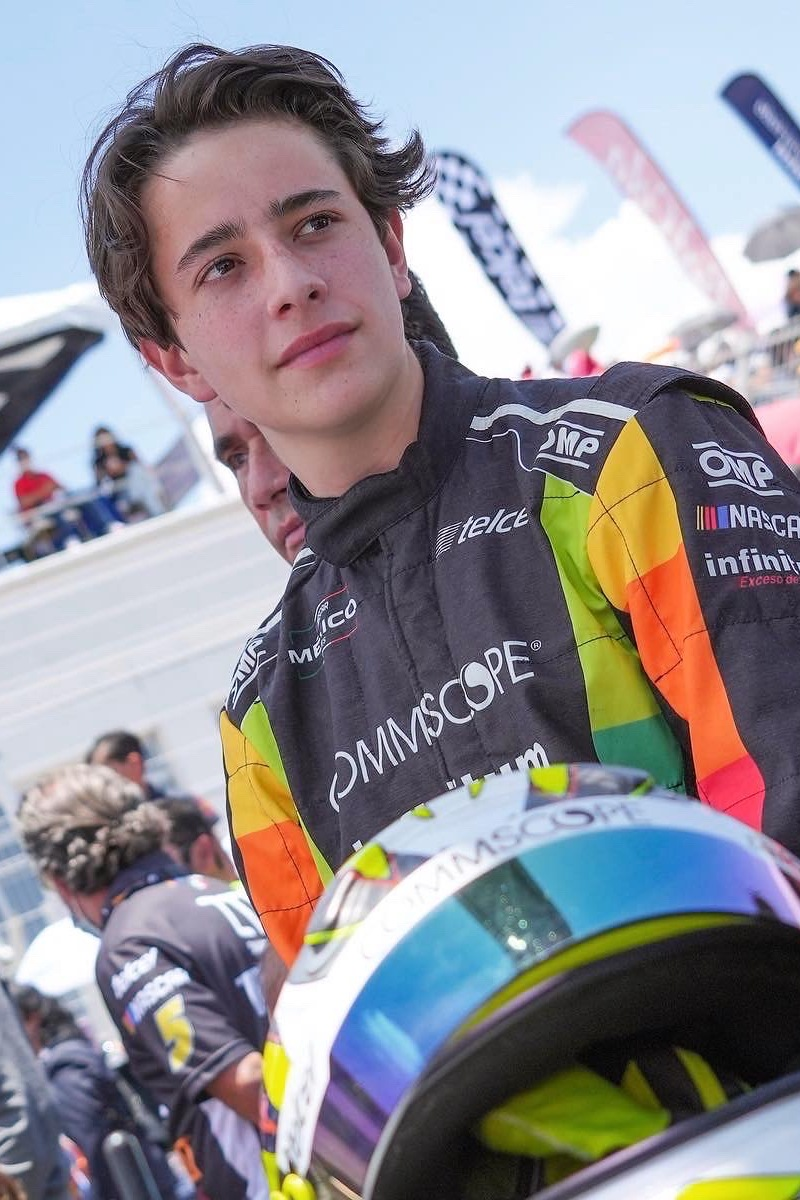
Andrés Pérez de Lara, the 2024 ARCA Menards Series champion.

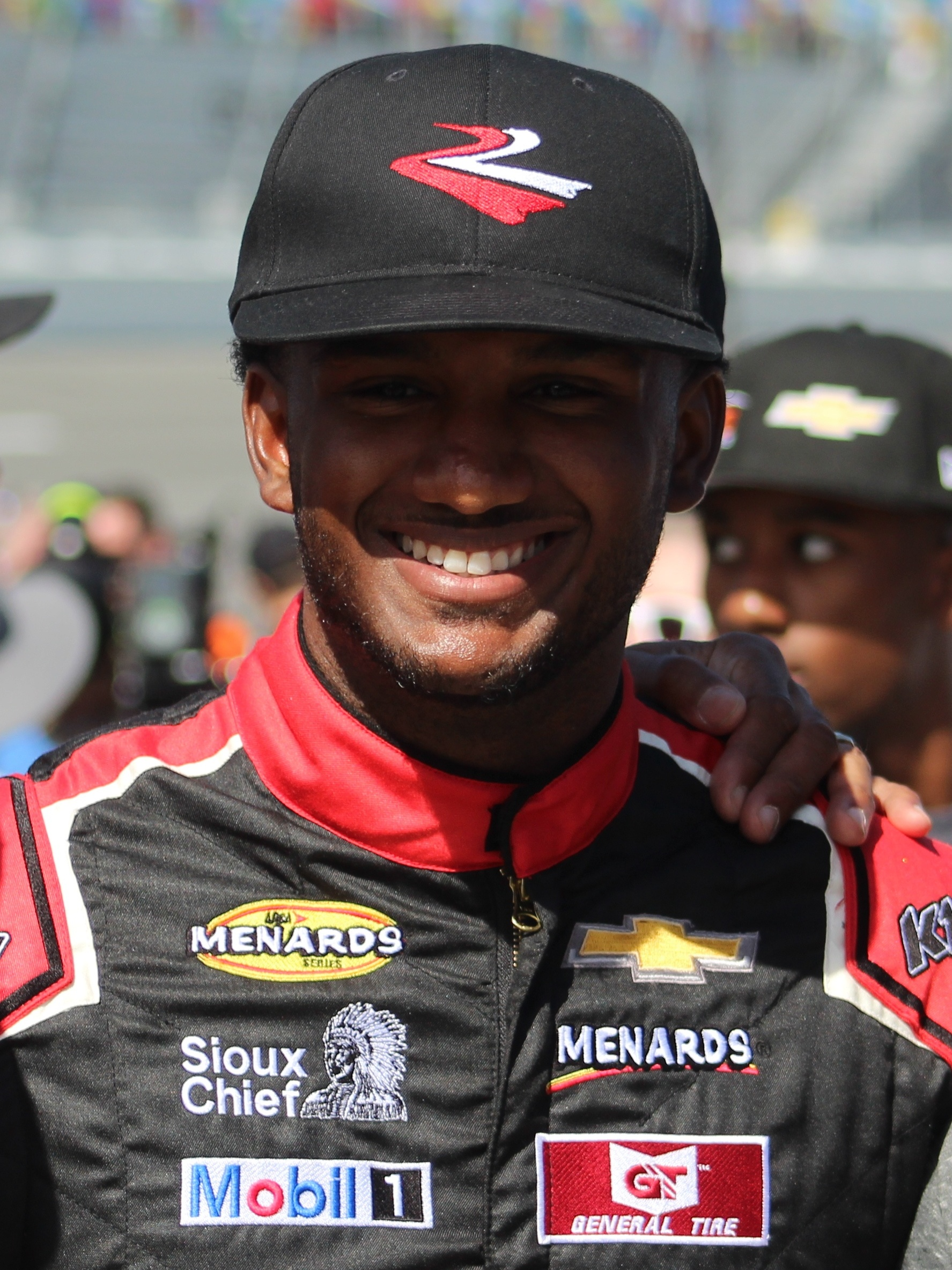
Lavar Scott finished second behind Pérez in the championship by 41 points.

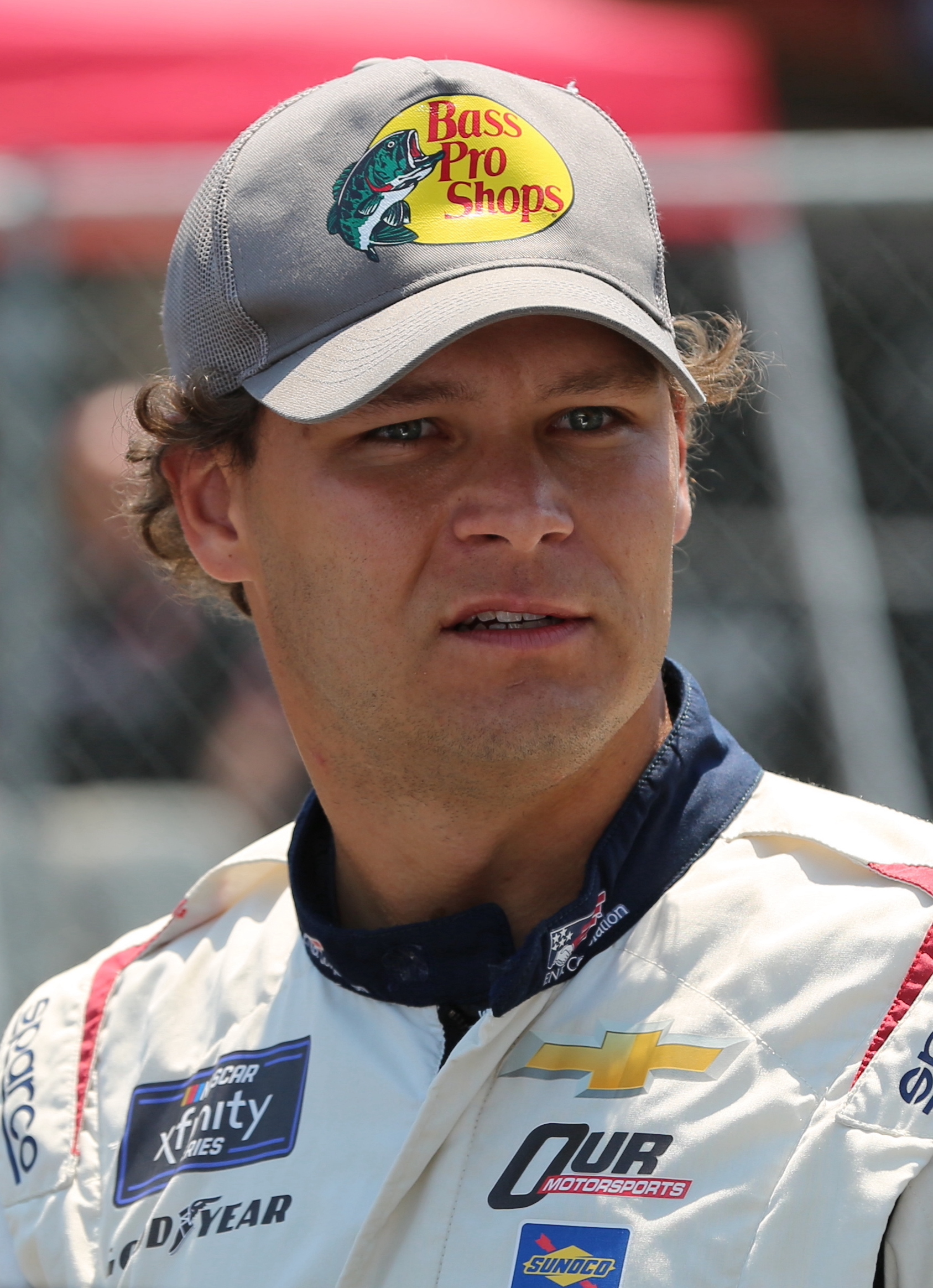
Kris Wright finished third behind Pérez in the championship by 79 points.

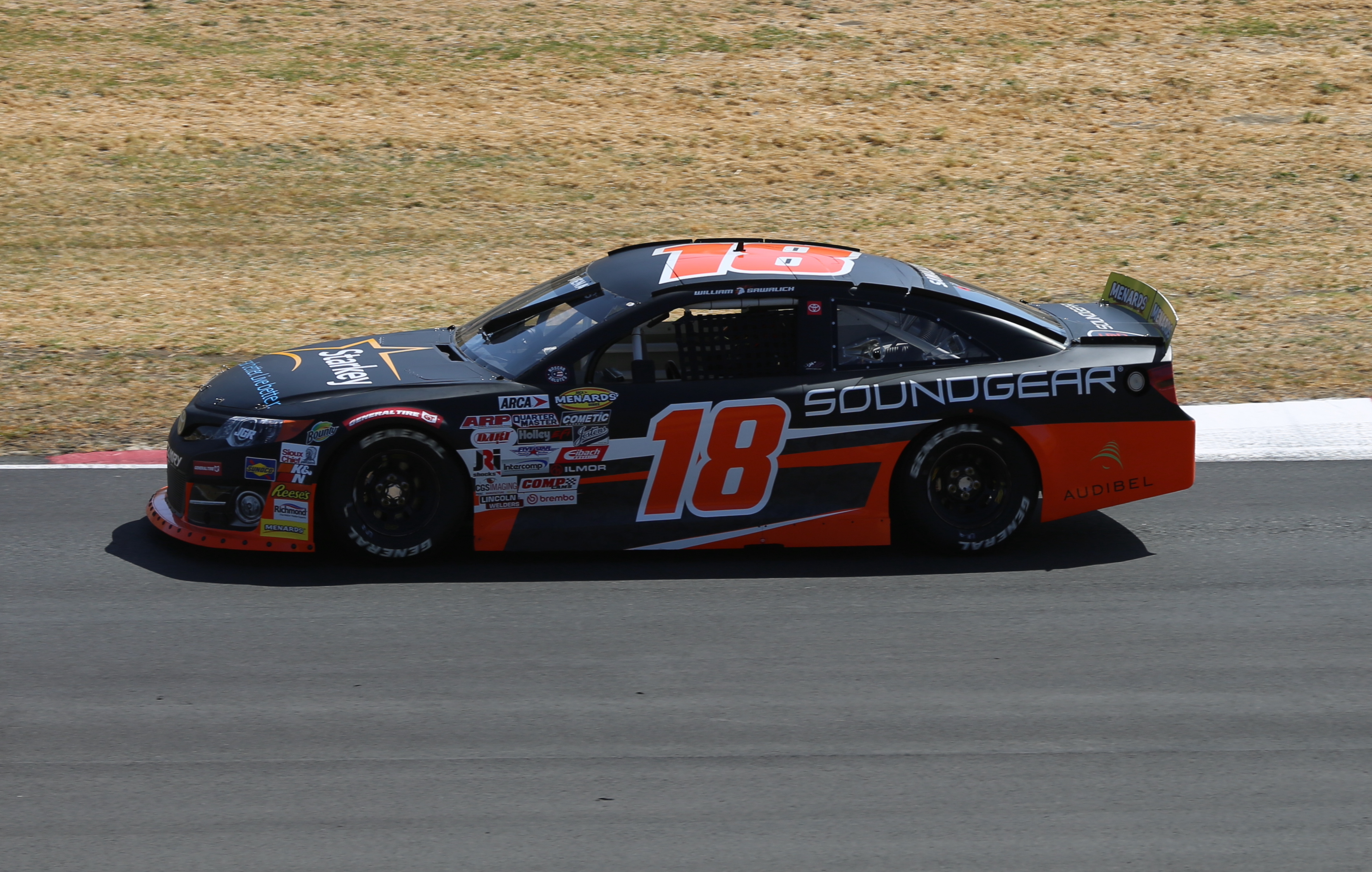
The No. 18 car of Joe Gibbs Racing won the owners' championship.

The 2024 ARCA Menards Series was the 72nd season of the ARCA Menards Series, a stock car racing series sanctioned by NASCAR in the United States. The season began at Daytona International Speedway with the Hard Rock Bet 200 on February 16 and ended with the Owens Corning 200 at Toledo Speedway on October 5.

Jesse Love, the 2023 series champion, did not return to run full-time in the ARCA Menards Series in 2024 and defend his title as he joined Richard Childress Racing to run full-time for them in the 2024 NASCAR Xfinity Series. At the conclusion of the season finale at Toledo, Andrés Pérez de Lara of Rev Racing became the first foreign-born ARCA Menards Series champion. Pérez de Lara also became the first champion since Bob Dotter in 1980 to win the title without a single race win. In fact, no full-time competitor won any races as Joe Gibbs Racing driver William Sawalich took nine victories, Connor Zilisch won five times, Tanner Gray took two victories, and the rest of the wins were split evenly by Gus Dean — the winner at Daytona — Jake Finch, Connor Mosack, and Brent Crews.

== Teams and drivers ==
Note: If a driver is listed as their own crew chief for a particular race, that means that their entry in that race was a start and park.

=== Complete schedule ===
Manufacturer	Team	No.	Driver	Crew Chief
Chevrolet	Fast Track Racing	99	Michael Maples (R)	Mike Sroufe
Chevrolet	Rev Racing	2	Andrés Pérez de Lara	Glenn Parker
Chevrolet	Rev Racing	6	Lavar Scott (R)	Danny Johnson
Chevrolet	Rise Motorsports	31	Mitch Gibson 2	Rita Goulet 1 Tim Goulet 9 Matthew Wright 9 Nikolas Smith 1
Chevrolet	Rise Motorsports	31	Garrett Zacharias 1	Rita Goulet 1 Tim Goulet 9 Matthew Wright 9 Nikolas Smith 1
Chevrolet	Rise Motorsports	31	Casey Carden 2	Rita Goulet 1 Tim Goulet 9 Matthew Wright 9 Nikolas Smith 1
Chevrolet	Rise Motorsports	31	Rita Goulet 6	Rita Goulet 1 Tim Goulet 9 Matthew Wright 9 Nikolas Smith 1
Chevrolet	Rise Motorsports	31	Brayton Laster 3	Rita Goulet 1 Tim Goulet 9 Matthew Wright 9 Nikolas Smith 1
Chevrolet	Rise Motorsports	31	Rob Pellosie 2	Rita Goulet 1 Tim Goulet 9 Matthew Wright 9 Nikolas Smith 1
Chevrolet	Rise Motorsports	31	Tim Goulet 2	Rita Goulet 1 Tim Goulet 9 Matthew Wright 9 Nikolas Smith 1
Chevrolet	Rise Motorsports	31	Rick Redig-Tackman 1	Rita Goulet 1 Tim Goulet 9 Matthew Wright 9 Nikolas Smith 1
Chevrolet	Rise Motorsports	31	Presley Sorah 1	Rita Goulet 1 Tim Goulet 9 Matthew Wright 9 Nikolas Smith 1
Ford	AM Racing	32	Christian Rose	Ryan London
Ford	Clubb Racing Inc.	03	Alex Clubb	Brian Clubb
Toyota	Joe Gibbs Racing	18	Tanner Gray 6	Matt Ross
Toyota	Joe Gibbs Racing	18	William Sawalich 14	Matt Ross
Toyota	Venturini Motorsports	15	Kris Wright	Larry Balsitis
Toyota	Venturini Motorsports	20	Jake Finch 5	Shannon Rursch 9 Kevin Reed Jr. 9 Billy Venturini 2
Toyota	Venturini Motorsports	20	Gio Ruggiero 10	Shannon Rursch 9 Kevin Reed Jr. 9 Billy Venturini 2
Toyota	Venturini Motorsports	20	Dean Thompson 1	Shannon Rursch 9 Kevin Reed Jr. 9 Billy Venturini 2
Toyota	Venturini Motorsports	20	Sean Hingorani 2	Shannon Rursch 9 Kevin Reed Jr. 9 Billy Venturini 2
Toyota	Venturini Motorsports	20	Isabella Robusto 1	Shannon Rursch 9 Kevin Reed Jr. 9 Billy Venturini 2
Toyota	Venturini Motorsports	20	Brent Crews 1	Shannon Rursch 9 Kevin Reed Jr. 9 Billy Venturini 2
Toyota	Venturini Motorsports	22	Amber Balcaen	Dave Fuge 7 Jeff Spraker 11; Dave Adams 1 Greg Ely 1
Toyota	Venturini Motorsports	25	Toni Breidinger	Cayden Lapcevich
Toyota	Venturini Motorsports	55	Gus Dean 6	Kevin Reed Jr. 10; Kevin Eagle 4 Doug George 2 Billy Venturini 4
Toyota	Venturini Motorsports	55	Isabella Robusto 3	Kevin Reed Jr. 10; Kevin Eagle 4 Doug George 2 Billy Venturini 4
Toyota	Venturini Motorsports	55	Brent Crews 3	Kevin Reed Jr. 10; Kevin Eagle 4 Doug George 2 Billy Venturini 4
Toyota	Venturini Motorsports	55	Dean Thompson 4	Kevin Reed Jr. 10; Kevin Eagle 4 Doug George 2 Billy Venturini 4
Toyota	Venturini Motorsports	55	Gavan Boschele 1	Kevin Reed Jr. 10; Kevin Eagle 4 Doug George 2 Billy Venturini 4
Toyota	Venturini Motorsports	55	Taylor Reimer 2	Kevin Reed Jr. 10; Kevin Eagle 4 Doug George 2 Billy Venturini 4
Toyota	Venturini Motorsports	55	Jake Finch 1	Kevin Reed Jr. 10; Kevin Eagle 4 Doug George 2 Billy Venturini 4
Chevrolet 1 Ford 9 Toyota 10	Fast Track Racing	10	Ed Pompa 5	David Ifft 1 Nathan Davis 4 Todd Parrott 3 Dick Doheny 1 Chris Vanscoy 10; Nyx Harenberg 1
Chevrolet 1 Ford 9 Toyota 10	Fast Track Racing	10	Brayton Laster 1	David Ifft 1 Nathan Davis 4 Todd Parrott 3 Dick Doheny 1 Chris Vanscoy 10; Nyx Harenberg 1
Chevrolet 1 Ford 9 Toyota 10	Fast Track Racing	10	Ryan Huff 1	David Ifft 1 Nathan Davis 4 Todd Parrott 3 Dick Doheny 1 Chris Vanscoy 10; Nyx Harenberg 1
Chevrolet 1 Ford 9 Toyota 10	Fast Track Racing	10	Cody Dennison (R) 3 (Note: Dennison ran the full season split between the Clubb Racing Inc. No. 86 car, the Fast Track Racing Nos. 01/10/11 cars, the Wayne Peterson Racing No. 06 car, and the CW Motorsports No. 93 car.)	David Ifft 1 Nathan Davis 4 Todd Parrott 3 Dick Doheny 1 Chris Vanscoy 10; Nyx Harenberg 1
Chevrolet 1 Ford 9 Toyota 10	Fast Track Racing	10	Christopher Tate 2	David Ifft 1 Nathan Davis 4 Todd Parrott 3 Dick Doheny 1 Chris Vanscoy 10; Nyx Harenberg 1
Chevrolet 1 Ford 9 Toyota 10	Fast Track Racing	10	Brad Perez 1	David Ifft 1 Nathan Davis 4 Todd Parrott 3 Dick Doheny 1 Chris Vanscoy 10; Nyx Harenberg 1
Chevrolet 1 Ford 9 Toyota 10	Fast Track Racing	10	Matt Kemp 1	David Ifft 1 Nathan Davis 4 Todd Parrott 3 Dick Doheny 1 Chris Vanscoy 10; Nyx Harenberg 1
Chevrolet 1 Ford 9 Toyota 10	Fast Track Racing	10	Jayson Alexander 2	David Ifft 1 Nathan Davis 4 Todd Parrott 3 Dick Doheny 1 Chris Vanscoy 10; Nyx Harenberg 1
Chevrolet 1 Ford 9 Toyota 10	Fast Track Racing	10	Bryce Haugeberg 2	David Ifft 1 Nathan Davis 4 Todd Parrott 3 Dick Doheny 1 Chris Vanscoy 10; Nyx Harenberg 1
Chevrolet 1 Ford 9 Toyota 10	Fast Track Racing	10	Daylan Hairston 1	David Ifft 1 Nathan Davis 4 Todd Parrott 3 Dick Doheny 1 Chris Vanscoy 10; Nyx Harenberg 1
Chevrolet 1 Ford 9 Toyota 10	Fast Track Racing	10	Willie Mullins 1	David Ifft 1 Nathan Davis 4 Todd Parrott 3 Dick Doheny 1 Chris Vanscoy 10; Nyx Harenberg 1
Toyota 17 Ford 3	Fast Track Racing	11	Bryce Haugeberg 2	Dick Doheny 4 Chris Vanscoy 6 Todd Parrott 8 Nathan Davis 2
Toyota 17 Ford 3	Fast Track Racing	11	Brad Perez 1	Dick Doheny 4 Chris Vanscoy 6 Todd Parrott 8 Nathan Davis 2
Toyota 17 Ford 3	Fast Track Racing	11	Zachary Tinkle 5	Dick Doheny 4 Chris Vanscoy 6 Todd Parrott 8 Nathan Davis 2
Toyota 17 Ford 3	Fast Track Racing	11	Cody Dennison (R) 11	Dick Doheny 4 Chris Vanscoy 6 Todd Parrott 8 Nathan Davis 2
Toyota 17 Ford 3	Fast Track Racing	11	Jayson Alexander 1	Dick Doheny 4 Chris Vanscoy 6 Todd Parrott 8 Nathan Davis 2
Ford 13 Toyota 4 Chevrolet 3	Fast Track Racing	12	Ryan Roulette 11	Jeremy Petty 9 Chris Vanscoy 2 Nathan Davis 6 Tim Monroe 2 Todd Parrott 1
Ford 13 Toyota 4 Chevrolet 3	Fast Track Racing	12	Mike Basham 2	Jeremy Petty 9 Chris Vanscoy 2 Nathan Davis 6 Tim Monroe 2 Todd Parrott 1
Ford 13 Toyota 4 Chevrolet 3	Fast Track Racing	12	Presley Sorah 1	Jeremy Petty 9 Chris Vanscoy 2 Nathan Davis 6 Tim Monroe 2 Todd Parrott 1
Ford 13 Toyota 4 Chevrolet 3	Fast Track Racing	12	Tim Monroe 3	Jeremy Petty 9 Chris Vanscoy 2 Nathan Davis 6 Tim Monroe 2 Todd Parrott 1
Ford 13 Toyota 4 Chevrolet 3	Fast Track Racing	12	Brayton Laster 1	Jeremy Petty 9 Chris Vanscoy 2 Nathan Davis 6 Tim Monroe 2 Todd Parrott 1
Ford 13 Toyota 4 Chevrolet 3	Fast Track Racing	12	Eric Caudell 1	Jeremy Petty 9 Chris Vanscoy 2 Nathan Davis 6 Tim Monroe 2 Todd Parrott 1
Ford 13 Toyota 4 Chevrolet 3	Fast Track Racing	12	Takuma Koga 1	Jeremy Petty 9 Chris Vanscoy 2 Nathan Davis 6 Tim Monroe 2 Todd Parrott 1
Ford 19 Chevrolet 1	Brad Smith Motorsports	48	Brad Smith	Terry Strange 5 Rand Bitter 1 Jeff Smith 10; Brad Smith 1 Chris Reed 1 Gary Sevenans 1 Carl Brown 1
Chevrolet 1 Toyota 11 Ford 8	Wayne Peterson Racing	06	Tommy O'Leary IV 1	Nate Moeller 11; Michael Peterson 1 Wayne Peterson 8
Chevrolet 1 Toyota 11 Ford 8	Wayne Peterson Racing	06	Cody Dennison (R) 2	Nate Moeller 11; Michael Peterson 1 Wayne Peterson 8
Chevrolet 1 Toyota 11 Ford 8	Wayne Peterson Racing	06	Con Nicolopoulos 2	Nate Moeller 11; Michael Peterson 1 Wayne Peterson 8
Chevrolet 1 Toyota 11 Ford 8	Wayne Peterson Racing	06	Kevin Hinckle 3	Nate Moeller 11; Michael Peterson 1 Wayne Peterson 8
Chevrolet 1 Toyota 11 Ford 8	Wayne Peterson Racing	06	Nate Moeller 9	Nate Moeller 11; Michael Peterson 1 Wayne Peterson 8
Chevrolet 1 Toyota 11 Ford 8	Wayne Peterson Racing	06	Brayton Laster 2	Nate Moeller 11; Michael Peterson 1 Wayne Peterson 8
Chevrolet 1 Toyota 11 Ford 8	Wayne Peterson Racing	06	Austin Vaughn 1 (Note: Entry was fielded in a collaboration with VWV Racing.)	Nate Moeller 11; Michael Peterson 1 Wayne Peterson 8

=== Limited schedule ===
Manufacturer	Team	No.	Driver	Crew chief	Races
Chevrolet	1/4 Ley Racing	4	Dale Quarterley	Robert Torriere 1 Alex Quarterley 3 Aidan Quarterley 1	5
Chevrolet	Bill McAnally Racing	16	Jack Wood	Kevin Bellicourt	1
Chevrolet	Bill McAnally Racing	19	Eric Johnson Jr.	John Camilleri	1
Chevrolet	Brother-In-Law Racing	57	Hunter Deshautelle	Dick Rahilly 2 Bob Rahilly 1	2
Chevrolet	Brother-In-Law Racing	57	Austin McDaniel	Dick Rahilly 2 Bob Rahilly 1	1
Chevrolet	Brother-In-Law Racing	75	Bryan Dauzat	Bob Rahilly	1
Chevrolet	Brother-In-Law Racing	75	Hunter Deshautelle (Note: At Daytona (race #1), Bryan Dauzat qualified the No. 75 car but after Deshautelle failed to qualify for the race in his own No. 57 car, he replaced Dauzat in the No. 75.)	Bob Rahilly	2
Chevrolet	Charles Buchanan Racing	87	Chuck Buchanan Jr.	Craig Wood	2
Chevrolet	CK Motorsports	71	Christopher Werth	Ron Otto	1
Chevrolet	Cook Racing Technologies	17	Marco Andretti	Sean Samuels	11
Chevrolet	CR7 Motorsports	97	Jason Kitzmiller	Todd Myers 1 Frank Kimmel 5	5
Chevrolet	CR7 Motorsports	97	Landen Lewis	Todd Myers 1 Frank Kimmel 5	1
Chevrolet	Empire Racing	8	Sean Corr	Mike Cheek 1 Derek Kearns 1 Adam Murphy 2	4
Chevrolet	Fierce Creature Racing	27	Bobby Hillis Jr.	Tony Huffman	1
Chevrolet	Hettinger Racing	71	Dawson Sutton	Mardy Lindley	1
Chevrolet	Kennealy Keller Motorsports	07	Danica Dart	John Keller	1
Chevrolet	Kelly Kovski Racing	16	Kelly Kovski	Roy Kovski	2
Chevrolet	Moyer-Petroniro Racing	88	A. J. Moyer	Joe McDonald 1 Rick Maring 2	3
Chevrolet	Pinnacle Racing Group (Note: Entries for van Gisbergen and Zilisch were fielded in a collaboration with Trackhouse Racing.)	28	Shane van Gisbergen	Shane Huffman	1
Chevrolet	Pinnacle Racing Group	28	Connor Mosack	Shane Huffman	4
Chevrolet	Pinnacle Racing Group	28	Connor Zilisch	Shane Huffman	8
Chevrolet	Pinnacle Racing Group	28	Corey Day	Shane Huffman	1
Chevrolet	Pinnacle Racing Group	82	Carson Kvapil	Michael Shelton 1 Andrew Overstreet 1	2
Chevrolet	Pinnacle Racing Group	82	Corey Day	Greg Ives 2	2
Chevrolet	Rev Racing	9	Sebastian Arias	Jay Lupo	2
Chevrolet	Rev Racing	9	Logan Misuraca	Jay Lupo	1
Chevrolet	Scofield Motorsports	07	Jeff Scofield	Brian Finney	1
Chevrolet	Sigma Performance Services	23	Grant Enfinger	Jeff Stankiewicz 1 Chris Bray 1 Blake Bainbridge 1 Joe Farré 1	1
Chevrolet	Sigma Performance Services	23	Mason Mitchell	Jeff Stankiewicz 1 Chris Bray 1 Blake Bainbridge 1 Joe Farré 1	1
Chevrolet	Sigma Performance Services	23	Connor Mosack	Jeff Stankiewicz 1 Chris Bray 1 Blake Bainbridge 1 Joe Farré 1	1
Chevrolet	Sigma Performance Services	23	Tyler Reif	Jeff Stankiewicz 1 Chris Bray 1 Blake Bainbridge 1 Joe Farré 1	1
Chevrolet	Sigma Performance Services	24	Joe Farré	Chris Bray	1
Chevrolet	Spraker Racing Enterprises	63	John Aramendia	Jeff Spraker	3
Chevrolet	Steve Lewis Racing	62	Steve Lewis Jr.	Steve Lewis Sr.	1
Chevrolet	Team Chick Motorsports	74	Mandy Chick	Steve Chick	3
Chevrolet	Young's Motorsports	02	Leland Honeyman	Andrew Abbott	1
Ford	City Garage Motorsports	85	Becca Monopoli	Tom Monopoli	2
Ford	Clubb Racing Inc.	86	Cody Dennison (R)	Hunter Bullins 1 Travis McLaughlin 2 Brian Harsein 5 Brian Clubb 1	1
Ford	Clubb Racing Inc.	86	Presley Sorah	Hunter Bullins 1 Travis McLaughlin 2 Brian Harsein 5 Brian Clubb 1	1
Ford	Clubb Racing Inc.	86	Chris Golden	Hunter Bullins 1 Travis McLaughlin 2 Brian Harsein 5 Brian Clubb 1	3
Ford	Clubb Racing Inc.	86	Casey Carden	Hunter Bullins 1 Travis McLaughlin 2 Brian Harsein 5 Brian Clubb 1	1
Ford	Clubb Racing Inc.	86	Brian Clubb	Hunter Bullins 1 Travis McLaughlin 2 Brian Harsein 5 Brian Clubb 1	4
Ford	Greg Van Alst Motorsports	34	Isaac Johnson	Kevin Shannon	5
Ford	High Point Racing	50	Trevor Huddleston	Jeff Schrader	1
Ford	Huff Racing	36	Ryan Huff	Richard Burgess 1 James Huff 2	3
Ford	Jan's Towing Racing	71	Nick Joanides	Rip Michels	1
Ford	Kennealy Keller Motorsports	1	Robbie Kennealy	Charlie Wilson	1
Ford	Kennealy Keller Motorsports	70	Kyle Keller	Brian Kizer	1
Ford	Lowden Jackson Motorsports	41	Johnny Borneman III	Tony Jackson	1
Ford	Naake Klauer Motorsports	88	Jake Bollman	Mike Naake	1
Ford	Reaume Brothers Racing	33	Lawless Alan	Greg Ely 1 Doug George 1 Josh Reaume 5	6
Ford	Reaume Brothers Racing	33	Frankie Muniz	Greg Ely 1 Doug George 1 Josh Reaume 5	1
Ford	Rette Jones Racing	30	Justin Bonsignore	Mark Rette	1
Ford	Rette Jones Racing	30	Frankie Muniz	Mark Rette	1
Ford	Rette Jones Racing	30	Conor Daly	Mark Rette	1
Ford	Rette Jones Racing	30	Dylan Lupton	Mark Rette	1
Ford	SS-Green Light Racing	08	Patrick Emerling	Jason Miller	1
Ford	Tamayo Cosentino Racing	45	E. J. Tamayo	Ethan Hutchins	1
Toyota	Central Coast Racing	3	Todd Souza	Jason Dickenson	2
Toyota	CW Motorsports	39	D. L. Wilson	Riley Higgins 4 Tony Cosentino 1	5
Toyota	Hattori Racing Enterprises	61	Sean Hingorani	Mark McFarland	1
Toyota	Jerry Pitts Racing	7	Takuma Koga	Denny Moyer	1
Toyota	MacZink Racing	65	Jeffery MacZink	Jarod MacZink	1
Toyota	MAN Motorsports	95	Brayton Laster (Note: Entry was fielded in a collaboration with TC Motorsports)	Tony Ponkauskas	1
Toyota	MAN Motorsports	95	Andrew Patterson	Tony Ponkauskas	5
Toyota	MAN Motorsports	96	Jackson McLerran	David Noble	1
Toyota	MBM Motorsports	13	Armani Williams	Rick Markle	1
Toyota	Mixon Racing (Note: Entry was fielded in a collaboration with Mike Harmon Racing)	47	Becca Monopoli	Mike Harmon	1
Toyota	NEMCO Motorsports	29	Ryan Gemmell	Joe Nemechek	1
Toyota	Performance P–1 Motorsports	77	Cody Kiemele	Ryan Sebek	1
Toyota	Phoenix Racing	1	Jake Finch	Johnny Allen	1
Toyota	Richmond Motorsports	27	Tim Richmond	Adam Murphy	7
Toyota	Shearer Speed Racing	98	Dale Shearer	Ian Egert 3 A. J. Brunson 5 Matt Paulson 1	9
Toyota	Shockwave Motorsports	05	David Smith	Brandon Carlson	1
Chevrolet 6 Ford 3	CW Motorsports	93	Caleb Costner (R)	Darrell Phillips 2 Riley Higgins 2 Brandon Hargrave 1 Caleb Costner 1 Colton Collins 1 Ryan Honeycutt 1 Jeff Phillips 1	5
Chevrolet 6 Ford 3	CW Motorsports	93	Cody Dennison (R)	Darrell Phillips 2 Riley Higgins 2 Brandon Hargrave 1 Caleb Costner 1 Colton Collins 1 Ryan Honeycutt 1 Jeff Phillips 1	1
Chevrolet 6 Ford 3	CW Motorsports	93	Tyler Tomassi	Darrell Phillips 2 Riley Higgins 2 Brandon Hargrave 1 Caleb Costner 1 Colton Collins 1 Ryan Honeycutt 1 Jeff Phillips 1	2
Chevrolet 6 Ford 3	CW Motorsports	93	Brian Clubb (Note: Entry was fielded in a collaboration with Clubb Racing Inc.)	Darrell Phillips 2 Riley Higgins 2 Brandon Hargrave 1 Caleb Costner 1 Colton Collins 1 Ryan Honeycutt 1 Jeff Phillips 1	1
Chevrolet 2 Ford 2	Ferrier McClure Racing	44	Thomas Annunziata	Jeff McClure	4
Chevrolet 2 Ford 13	Greg Van Alst Motorsports	35	Greg Van Alst	Jim Long	15
Chevrolet 3 Toyota 1	Cook Racing Technologies	42	Tanner Reif	Jerry Babb 3 Amber Slagle 1	3
Chevrolet 3 Toyota 1	Cook Racing Technologies	42	Brandon Jones	Jerry Babb 3 Amber Slagle 1	1
Ford 3 Chevrolet 1	Kimmel Racing	68	Gil Linster	Will Kimmel 1 Brian Finney 1 Bill Kimmel 1 Tony Hevrin 1	1
Ford 3 Chevrolet 1	Kimmel Racing	68	Jeff Scofield (Note: Entry was fielded in a collaboration with Scofield Motorsports.)	Will Kimmel 1 Brian Finney 1 Bill Kimmel 1 Tony Hevrin 1	1
Ford 3 Chevrolet 1	Kimmel Racing	68	Will Kimmel	Will Kimmel 1 Brian Finney 1 Bill Kimmel 1 Tony Hevrin 1	1 (Note: Kimmel Racing withdrew from the race at Kansas in May, after one of the two cars came loose in the hauler and damaged both cars.)
Ford 3 Chevrolet 1	Kimmel Racing	68	Mike Basham	Will Kimmel 1 Brian Finney 1 Bill Kimmel 1 Tony Hevrin 1	1
Ford 5 Toyota 1	Kimmel Racing	69	Scott Melton	Bill Kimmel	3
Ford 5 Toyota 1	Kimmel Racing	69	Will Kimmel	Bill Kimmel	3
Ford 2 Toyota 8 Chevrolet 1	KLAS Motorsports	73	Andy Jankowiak	Mike Dayton	11
Toyota 1 Ford 1	Central Coast Racing	13	Tyler Reif	Michael Muñoz 1 Unknown 1	2
Toyota 2 Ford 1 Chevrolet 1	CCM Racing	7	Eric Caudell (Note: At Daytona (race #1), Eric Caudell originally qualified the No. 7 for the race. However, he withdrew after qualifying. Shane Van Gisbergen who originally did not qualified for the race, took over Caudell's spot in the race.)	Kyle Totman 3 Jeremy Petty 1	4
Toyota 2 Ford 2	Fast Track Racing	01	Takuma Koga	Todd Parrott 1 Nathan Davis 1 Dick Doheny 1 Nyx Harenberg 1	1
Toyota 2 Ford 2	Fast Track Racing	01	Cody Dennison (R)	Todd Parrott 1 Nathan Davis 1 Dick Doheny 1 Nyx Harenberg 1	2
Toyota 2 Ford 2	Fast Track Racing	01	Matt Kemp	Todd Parrott 1 Nathan Davis 1 Dick Doheny 1 Nyx Harenberg 1	1
Ford 1 Chevrolet 1	Mullins Racing 1; 1/4 Ley Racing 1 (Note: It was a 1/4 Ley Racing entry using Mullins Racing's owner points.)	3	Willie Mullins	Kevin Reed Sr.	1
Ford 1 Chevrolet 1	Mullins Racing 1; 1/4 Ley Racing 1	3	Alex Quarterley	Willie Mullins	1
Toyota 2 Ford 3	Wayne Peterson Racing	0	Ben Peterson	Wayne Peterson	1
Toyota 2 Ford 3	Wayne Peterson Racing	0	Nate Moeller	Wayne Peterson	3
Toyota 2 Ford 3	Wayne Peterson Racing	0	Con Nicolopoulos	Wayne Peterson	1

== Schedule ==
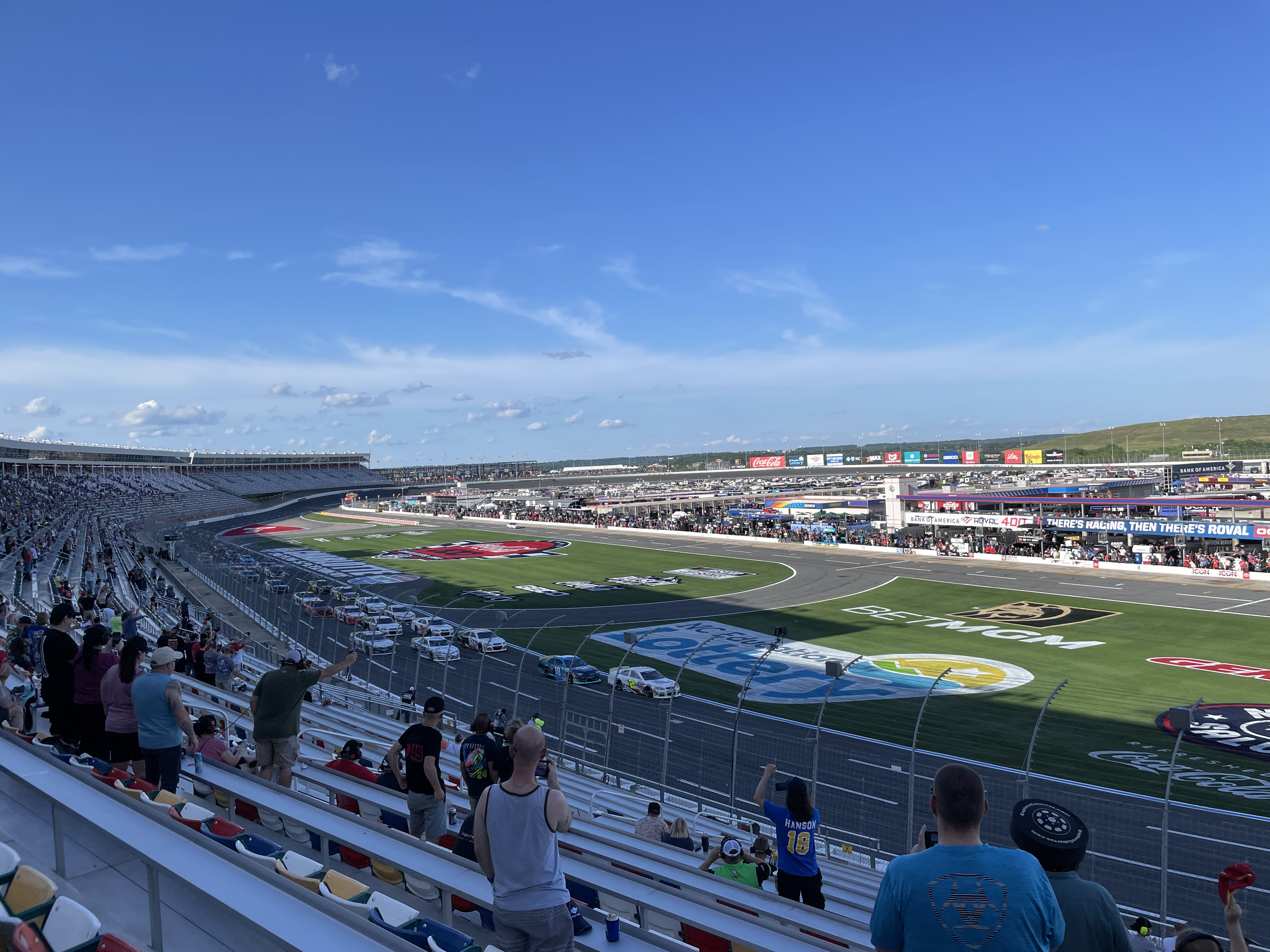
The General Tire 150 at Charlotte Motor Speedway in May

The entire schedule was released on November 8, 2023.

No	Race title	Track	Location	Date	TV	Live Stream
1	Hard Rock Bet 200	Daytona International Speedway	Daytona Beach, Florida	February 16–17 (Note: The Hard Rock Bet 200 was originally scheduled for Saturday, February 17, but was moved up a day due to rain in the forecast on Saturday. The race ended up going past midnight EST so part of it was still on the 17th.)	FS2/FS1	Fox Sports app
2	General Tire 150	Phoenix Raceway	Avondale, Arizona	March 8	FS1	Fox Sports app
3	General Tire 200	Talladega Superspeedway	Lincoln, Alabama	April 20	FS1	Fox Sports app
4	General Tire 150	Dover Motor Speedway	Dover, Delaware	April 26	FS2	Fox Sports app
5	Tide 150	Kansas Speedway	Kansas City, Kansas	May 4	FS1	Fox Sports app
6	General Tire 150	Charlotte Motor Speedway	Concord, North Carolina	May 24	FS1	Fox Sports app
7	Atlas 150	Iowa Speedway	Newton, Iowa	June 14	FS1	Fox Sports app
8	Zinsser SmartCoat 150	Mid-Ohio Sports Car Course	Lexington, Ohio	June 21	FS2	Fox Sports app/FloRacing
9	Berlin ARCA 200	Berlin Raceway	Marne, Michigan	June 29	FS1	Fox Sports app/FloRacing
10	Circle City 200	Lucas Oil Indianapolis Raceway Park	Brownsburg, Indiana	July 19	FS1	Fox Sports app/FloRacing
11	Salem ARCA 200	Salem Speedway	Salem, Indiana	July 27	FS1	Fox Sports app/FloRacing
12	Shore Lunch 250	Elko Speedway	Elko New Market, Minnesota	August 3	FS1	Fox Sports app/FloRacing
13	Henry Ford Health 200	Michigan International Speedway	Brooklyn, Michigan	August 16	FS1	Fox Sports app/FloRacing
14	Springfield ARCA 100	Illinois State Fairgrounds Racetrack	Springfield, Illinois	August 18	FS1	Fox Sports app/FloRacing
15	Sprecher 150	Milwaukee Mile	West Allis, Wisconsin	August 25	FS1	Fox Sports app/FloRacing
16	Southern Illinois 100	DuQuoin State Fairgrounds Racetrack	Du Quoin, Illinois	September 1	FS1	Fox Sports app/FloRacing
17	General Tire 100 at The Glen	Watkins Glen International	Watkins Glen, New York	September 13	FS1	Fox Sports app
18	Bush's Beans 200	Bristol Motor Speedway	Bristol, Tennessee	September 19	FS1	Fox Sports app
19	Reese's 150	Kansas Speedway	Kansas City, Kansas	September 27	FS1	Fox Sports app
20	Owens Corning 200	Toledo Speedway	Toledo, Ohio	October 5	FS2	Fox Sports app/FloRacing

=== Schedule changes ===
- The race at Pocono Raceway was removed from the schedule and replaced by a race at Dover Motor Speedway. The East Series has had a race at Dover since 2004 and this will be the first year since NASCAR's acquisition of ARCA in 2020 that it has been a combination race with the main ARCA Series. It will also be the first time the main ARCA Series has ever had a race at Dover. This is the first time since 1986 that the main ARCA Series will not have a race at Pocono, ending a 37-year run.
- The combination race at Iowa Speedway was moved from July to June in order for it to be on the same weekend as the track's new Cup Series race and its returning Xfinity Series race. This is the weekend the race at Berlin was on in 2023.
- The race at Mid-Ohio Sports Car Course moves from July to June. This is the weekend the race at Elko was on in 2023. The track lost its Truck Series race that had been on the same weekend as its ARCA race.
- The race at Berlin Raceway moves two weeks later in June.
- The combination race at Lucas Oil Indianapolis Raceway Park moves from August to July along with the track's Truck Series race and the Cup and Xfinity Series races at the nearby Indianapolis Motor Speedway.
- The race at Salem Speedway moves from September to July.
- The race at Elko Speedway moves from June to August to the weekend where the race at Michigan was in 2023.
- The race at Michigan International Speedway moves two weeks later in August along with the track's Cup and Xfinity Series races to the weekend where all three series raced at Watkins Glen in 2023.
- The race at Watkins Glen International moves from August to September along with the track's Cup and Xfinity Series races.
- The September race at Kansas Speedway moves three weeks later in the month to the weekend where the race at Salem was on in 2023.

== Results and standings ==
=== Race results ===
No.	Race	Pole position	Most laps led	Winning driver	Manufacturer	No.	Winning team	Report
1	Hard Rock Bet 200	Willie Mullins	Jake Finch	Gus Dean	Toyota	55	Venturini Motorsports	Report
2	General Tire 150	William Sawalich	William Sawalich	William Sawalich	Toyota	18	Joe Gibbs Racing	Report
3	General Tire 200	Jake Finch	Jake Finch	Jake Finch	Toyota	20	Venturini Motorsports	Report
4	General Tire 150	William Sawalich	William Sawalich	Connor Zilisch	Chevrolet	28	Pinnacle Racing Group	Report
5	Tide 150	Tanner Gray	Tanner Gray	Connor Mosack	Chevrolet	28	Pinnacle Racing Group	Report
6	General Tire 150	Andrés Pérez de Lara	Carson Kvapil	Tanner Gray	Toyota	18	Joe Gibbs Racing	Report
7	Atlas 150	Gio Ruggiero	Connor Zilisch	Connor Zilisch	Chevrolet	28	Pinnacle Racing Group	Report
8	Zinsser SmartCoat 150	Connor Mosack	Brent Crews	William Sawalich (Note: Connor Mosack initially crossed the finish line 1st but he was black flagged for jumping the last restart.)	Toyota	18	Joe Gibbs Racing	Report
9	Berlin ARCA 200	William Sawalich	William Sawalich	William Sawalich	Toyota	18	Joe Gibbs Racing	Report
10	Circle City 200	William Sawalich	Connor Zilisch	Connor Zilisch	Chevrolet	28	Pinnacle Racing Group	Report
11	Salem ARCA 200	William Sawalich	William Sawalich	William Sawalich	Toyota	18	Joe Gibbs Racing	Report
12	Shore Lunch 250	William Sawalich	William Sawalich	William Sawalich	Toyota	18	Joe Gibbs Racing	Report
13	Henry Ford Health 200	Andrés Pérez de Lara	Tanner Gray	Connor Zilisch	Chevrolet	28	Pinnacle Racing Group	Report
14	Springfield ARCA 100	William Sawalich	William Sawalich	William Sawalich	Toyota	18	Joe Gibbs Racing	Report
15	Sprecher 150	William Sawalich	William Sawalich	William Sawalich	Toyota	18	Joe Gibbs Racing	Report
16	Southern Illinois 100	William Sawalich	Brent Crews	Brent Crews	Toyota	20	Venturini Motorsports	Report
17	General Tire 100 at The Glen	Connor Zilisch	Connor Zilisch	Connor Zilisch	Chevrolet	28	Pinnacle Racing Group	Report
18	Bush's Beans 200	Connor Zilisch	William Sawalich	William Sawalich	Toyota	18	Joe Gibbs Racing	Report
19	Reese's 150	Isabella Robusto	Tanner Gray	Tanner Gray	Toyota	18	Joe Gibbs Racing	Report
20	Owens Corning 200	William Sawalich	William Sawalich	William Sawalich	Toyota	18	Joe Gibbs Racing	Report

=== Drivers' championship ===
Notes:

- The pole winner also receives one bonus point, similar to the previous ARCA points system used until 2019 and unlike NASCAR.
- Additionally, after groups of five races of the season, drivers that compete in all five races receive fifty additional points. These points bonuses will be given after the races at Kansas, Indianapolis, Milwaukee and Toledo.
  - Andrés Pérez de Lara, Greg Van Alst, Amber Balcaen, Christian Rose, Kris Wright, Lavar Scott, Andy Jankowiak, Toni Breidinger, Alex Clubb, Michael Maples, and Cody Dennison received this points bonus for having competed in the first five races of the season (Daytona, Phoenix, Talladega, Dover, and Kansas in May). Pérez de Lara, Scott, Van Alst, Wright, Balcaen, Breidinger, Rose, Maples, Clubb, Dennison, and Brad Smith received the fifty bonus points for having competed in the next five races (Charlotte, Iowa, Mid-Ohio, Berlin, and Indianapolis). Pérez de Lara, Scott, Wright, Rose, Breidinger, Balcaen, Dennison, Maples, Clubb and Smith received the fifty bonus points for having competed in the next five races (Salem, Elko, Michigan, Springfield, and Milwaukee). Pérez de Lara, Scott, Wright, Breidinger, Rose, Balcaen, Dennison, Maples, Clubb and Smith received the fifty bonus points for having competed in the final five races (DuQuoin, Watkins Glen, Bristol, Kansas in September, and Toledo).

(key) Bold – Pole position awarded by time. Italics – Pole position set by final practice results or rainout. * – Most laps led. ** – All laps led.

Pos	Driver	DAY	PHO	TAL	DOV	KAN	CLT	IOW	MOH	BLN	IRP	SLM	ELK	MCH	ISF	MLW	DSF	GLN	BRI	KAN	TOL	Points
1	Andrés Pérez de Lara	12	8	8	5	7	**3**	6	6	5	2	2	5	**2**	15	6	3	4	4	21	6	956
2	Lavar Scott **(R)**	15	10	31	4	13	5	9	14	2	4	3	2	15	5	3	6	9	3	3	5	915
3	Kris Wright	38	12	2	6	4	18	16	18	4	6	10	3	5	7	4	4	12	13	18	3	877
4	Toni Breidinger	37	9	10	15	10	12	8	7	6	24	16	7	8	6	11	9	17	12	12	7	837
5	Christian Rose	4	16	5	21	14	28	11	11	9	22	5	10	9	9	8	8	16	20	13	10	831
6	Amber Balcaen	9	15	7	20	8	15	24	16	10	13	24	12	10	8	20	11	29	25	6	13	786
7	Cody Dennison **(R)**	DNQ	DNQ	17	12	16	13	18	15	16	14	7	11	11	12	13	12	24	17	22	8	740
8	Michael Maples **(R)**	21	29	22	14	19	20	13	17	11	15	11	15	20	13	18	14	20	24	16	15	733
9	Alex Clubb	8	30	25	18	24	25	14	19	12	21	12	16	18	16	19	15	21	19	27	19	702
10	William Sawalich		**1***		**17***			2	1	**1***	**3**	**1****	**1***		**1***	**1***	**2**	2	1*		**1***	640
11	Greg Van Alst	3	13	11	8	12	11	23	10	7	8	17	9	6					21	20		582
12	Brad Smith	22	DNQ	30	Wth	23	26	26	24	18	31	21	20	21	19	22	22	28	32	25	12	523
13	Gio Ruggiero		2		2			**3**	3		5					9		6	15	5	2	393
14	Andy Jankowiak	10	27	27	7	6	14	5						19				13	10	7		389
15	Connor Zilisch				1			1*			1*			1		2		**1****	**26**	2		338
16	Marco Andretti	25	21		19	9		22	5		7					10		14	22	23		307
17	Ryan Roulette	23	28	20		20	16	15		15		8	14	16		17						292
18	Jake Finch	11*		1**		5						18		4				15	8			253
19	Nate Moeller								21	14	28		19	24	18	21	20	23	30		14	252
20	Tanner Gray	24		3		**2***	1							3*						1*		244
21	Gus Dean	1		4			6	7				14		14								222
22	Lawless Alan					11	8				23					5			9	8		200
23	Tim Richmond	5		16			17		12					22				26	16			194
24	Dean Thompson					3	7				9					7			5			183
25	Connor Mosack		4			1	27		**13**									5				176
26	Brayton Laster	DNQ	37			22					19	9			14		13	27				170
27	Brent Crews				16				2*								1**				4	160
28	Zachary Tinkle				10			20			11					12			11			156
29	Jason Kitzmiller	6		33			9							7						10		155
30	Isaac Johnson	18	24								10	6								9		153
31	Thomas Annunziata	2		12					4									7				151
32	Dale Shearer	DNQ		29	Wth			19		20	30	20							29		18	146
33	Rita Goulet				23			21			20	13				23				19		145
34	D. L. Wilson				11			12			16					14			23			144
35	Isabella Robusto		6										4		2					**28**		137
36	Andrew Patterson								22		12	22				16			18			130
37	Sean Hingorani		5							3			8									116
38	Sean Corr	30		6											11		17					113
39	Caleb Costner **(R)**	35	25	13	9		30															108
40	Will Kimmel					Wth	4					4					18					106
41	Corey Day											15							7	4		106
42	Ed Pompa	40		21	13							19						22				105
43	Brian Clubb												17		20	24	23		31			105
44	Bryce Haugeberg	26		18									13		17							102
45	Tim Monroe														10		10				16	96
46	Eric Caudell	Wth		15													Wth		14	14		89
47	Dale Quarterley	33							23						Wth		19	11				90
48	Carson Kvapil				3		2*															85
49	Kelly Kovski														4		5					79
50	Tanner Reif		14		22	18																78
51	Taylor Reimer														3		7					78
52	Mandy Chick	34				15														11		72
53	Jayson Alexander						29				18			13								72
54	Tyler Reif		11						Wth										6			71
55	Kevin Hinckle					21		17												26		68
56	Frankie Muniz			9										12								67
57	Hunter Deshautelle	20		24			23															65
58	Mike Basham				24				20			23										65
59	Chris Golden								25	19		25										63
60	Con Nicolopoulos	Wth		28			22							Wth							20	62
61	Presley Sorah							25			29										17	61
62	Sebastian Arias						10													17		61
63	Casey Carden			26							26			23								57
64	Tyler Tomassi										17					15						56
65	Ryan Huff	16		Wth		17	Wth															56
66	Christopher Tate							10												24		54
67	Becca Monopoli	DNQ									27										11	53
68	Takuma Koga	DNQ	23																	15		53
69	A. J. Moyer	DNQ		19			19															53
70	Willie Mullins	**28**																			9	53
71	Matt Kemp									17											21	50
72	Tim Goulet									13									28			47
73	Scott Melton	27		14		Wth																47
74	Landen Lewis																		2			43
75	Brad Perez		38						9													41
76	Grant Enfinger		3																			41
77	Mason Mitchell							4														40
78	E. J. Tamayo												6									38
79	Rob Pellosie								26									25				37
80	Jack Wood		7																			37
81	Gil Linster	7																				37
82	Gavan Boschele									8												36
83	Conor Daly								8													36
84	Ryan Gemmell																	8				36
85	Brandon Jones																	3				35
86	Dylan Lupton																	10				34
87	Mitch Gibson	DNQ					24												34			33
88	Armani Williams	13																				31
89	Steve Lewis Jr.	14																				30
90	Austin Vaughn																16					28
91	Trevor Huddleston		17																			27
92	Jeffery MacZink													17								27
93	Patrick Emerling	17																				27
94	Kyle Keller		18																			26
95	Rick Redig-Tackman												18									26
96	Alex Quarterley																	18				26
97	Todd Souza		19						Wth													25
98	Tommy O'Leary IV	19																				25
99	Christopher Werth																	19				25
100	Chuck Buchanan Jr.	DNQ		23			Wth															24
101	Eric Johnson Jr.		20																			24
102	Austin McDaniel						21															23
103	Daylan Hairston																21					23
104	Robbie Kennealy		22																			22
105	Jeff Scofield	36		32																		20
106	Jackson McLerran										25											19
107	Nick Joanides		26																			18
108	Logan Misuraca																		27			17
109	John Aramendia	39	34	Wth																		15
110	Shane van Gisbergen	29																				15
111	Jake Bollman		31																			13
112	Leland Honeyman	31																				13
113	David Smith		32																			12
114	Justin Bonsignore	32																				12
115	Johnny Borneman III		33																			11
116	Dawson Sutton																		33			11
117	Ben Peterson			34																		10
118	Joe Farré		35																			9
119	Bobby Hillis Jr.		36																			8
120	Cody Kiemele		39																			5
121	Danica Dart		40																			4
	Garrett Zacharias		DNQ																			
	Bryan Dauzat	QL																				
	Cayden Lapcevich																	RL				

== See also ==
- 2024 NASCAR Cup Series
- 2024 NASCAR Xfinity Series
- 2024 NASCAR Craftsman Truck Series
- 2024 ARCA Menards Series East
- 2024 ARCA Menards Series West
- 2024 NASCAR Whelen Modified Tour
- 2024 NASCAR Canada Series
- 2024 NASCAR Mexico Series
- 2024 NASCAR Whelen Euro Series
- 2024 NASCAR Brasil Sprint Race
- 2024 CARS Tour
- 2024 SMART Modified Tour
- 2024 ASA STARS National Tour
