= 2024 Southern Illinois 100 =

16th race of the 2024 ARCA Menards Series

Race details
- Race 16 of 20 of the 2024 ARCA Menards Series
- Date: September 1, 2024
- Official name: 44th Annual Southern Illinois 100
- Location: DuQuoin State Fairgrounds Racetrack in Du Quoin, Illinois
- Course: Permanent racing facility
- Course length: 1 miles (1.6 km)
- Distance: 100 laps, 100 mi (160 km)
- Scheduled distance: 100 laps, 100 mi (160 km)

Pole position
Driver	William Sawalich	Joe Gibbs Racing
- Time: 35.432

Most laps led
Driver	Brent Crews	Venturini Motorsports
- Laps: 100

Winner
No. 20	Brent Crews	Venturini Motorsports

Television in the United States
- Network: FS1
- Announcers: Eric Brennan and Phil Parsons

Radio in the United States
- Radio: ARCA Racing Network

The 2024 Southern Illinois 100 was the 16th stock car race of the 2024 ARCA Menards Series season, and the 44th iteration of the event. The race was held on Sunday, September 1, 2024, at the DuQuoin State Fairgrounds Racetrack in Du Quoin, Illinois, a 1-mile (1.6 km) permanent oval-shaped dirt track. The race took the scheduled 100 laps to complete. Brent Crews, driving for Venturini Motorsports, would hold off pole winner William Sawalich. To fill out the podium, Sawalich, driving for Joe Gibbs Racing and Andrés Pérez de Lara, driving for Rev Racing, would finish 2nd and 3rd, respectively.

== Report ==
=== Background ===
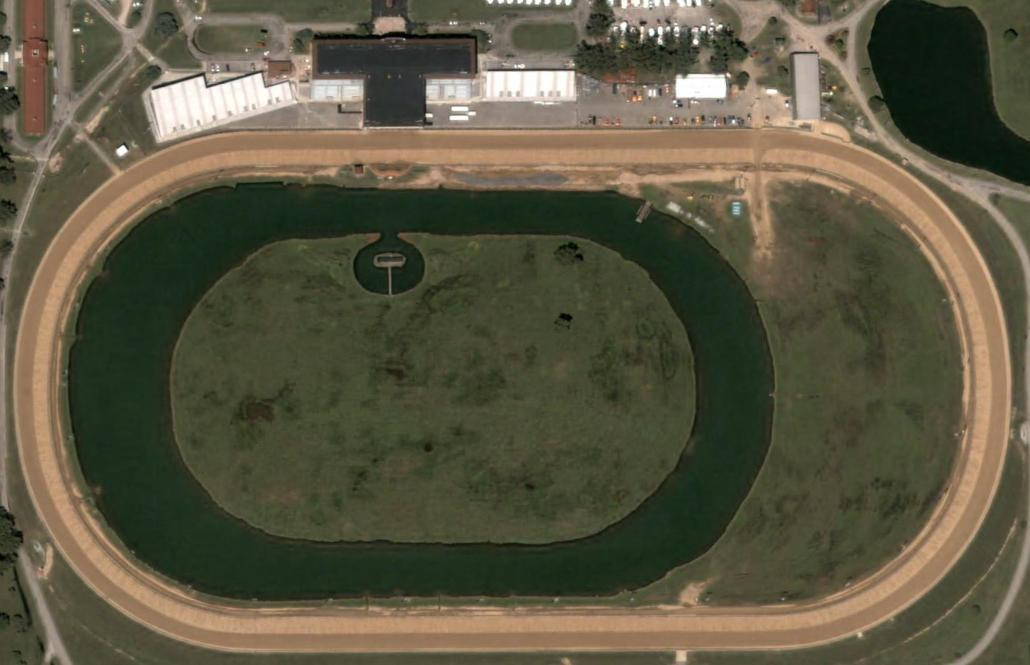
DuQuoin State Fairgrounds Racetrack, the circuit where the race was held.

DuQuoin State Fairgrounds Racetrack is a one-mile (1.6-km) clay oval motor racetrack in Du Quoin, Illinois, about 90 miles (140 km) southeast of St Louis, Missouri. It is a stop on the ARCA Menards Series, USAC Silver Crown Series and American Flat Track.

The DuQuoin "Magic Mile" racetrack was constructed on reclaimed stripmine land in 1946 by W.R. Hayes. The track's first national championship race was held in September 1948. In the second race on October 10, popular AAA National driving champion Ted Horn was killed in the fourth turn when a spindle on his championship car broke. The national championship race for the USAC Silver Crown dirt cars is held in his honor.

==== Entry list ====
- (R) denotes rookie driver.

#	Driver	Team	Make	Sponsor
0	Nate Moeller	Wayne Peterson Racing	Ford	Ocean Pipe Works
2	Andrés Pérez de Lara	Rev Racing	Chevrolet	Max Siegel Inc.
03	Alex Clubb	Clubb Racing Inc.	Ford	Race Parts Liquidators
4	Dale Quarterley	1/4 Ley Racing	Chevrolet	Van Dyk Recycling Solutions / Motul
06	Austin Vaughn	Wayne Peterson Racing	Toyota	Safford Equipment Company
6	Lavar Scott (R)	Rev Racing	Chevrolet	Max Siegel Inc.
7	Eric Caudell	CCM Racing	Ford	CCM
8	Sean Corr	Empire Racing	Chevrolet	NESCO Bus Sales
10	Daylan Hairston	Fast Track Racing	Ford	Memory of Ron Hutcherson
11	Cody Dennison (R)	Fast Track Racing	Toyota	Timcast
12	Tim Monroe	Fast Track Racing	Chevrolet	Illinois Trucking Association
15	Kris Wright	Venturini Motorsports	Toyota	FNB Corporation
16	Kelly Kovski	Kelly Kovski Racing	Chevrolet	BRANDT / Schluckebier Farms
18	William Sawalich	Joe Gibbs Racing	Toyota	Starkey / SoundGear
20	Brent Crews	Venturini Motorsports	Toyota	JBL
22	Amber Balcaen	Venturini Motorsports	Toyota	ICON Direct
25	Toni Breidinger	Venturini Motorsports	Toyota	Sunoco
31	Brayton Laster	Rise Motorsports	Chevrolet	AC-Cages.com / Goat Locker Racing
32	Christian Rose	AM Racing	Ford	West Virginia Department of Tourism
48	Brad Smith	Brad Smith Motorsports	Ford	Ski's Graphics
55	Taylor Reimer	Venturini Motorsports	Toyota	BuzzBallz
69	Will Kimmel	Kimmel Racing	Ford	Weddington Custom Homes
86	Brian Clubb	Clubb Racing Inc.	Ford	Race Parts Liquidators
99	Michael Maples (R)	Fast Track Racing	Chevrolet	Don Ray Petroleum LLC
Official entry list

== Practice ==
The first and only practice session was held on Sunday, September 1, at 4:30 PM CST, and lasted for 30 minutes. Taylor Reimer, driving for Venturini Motorsports, would set the fastest time in the session, with a lap of 34.997, and a speed of 102.866 mph (165.547 km/h).

Pos.	#	Driver	Team	Make	Time	Speed
1	55	Taylor Reimer	Venturini Motorsports	Toyota	34.997	102.866
2	20	Brent Crews	Venturini Motorsports	Toyota	35.018	102.804
3	69	Will Kimmel	Kimmel Racing	Ford	35.566	101.22
Full practice results

== Qualifying ==
Qualifying was held on Sunday, September 1, at 6:00 PM CST. The qualifying system used is a single-car, one-lap based system. Drivers will be on track by themselves and will have one lap to post a qualifying time, and whoever sets the fastest time will win the pole.

William Sawalich, driving for Joe Gibbs Racing, would score the pole for the race, with a lap of 35.432, and a speed of 101.603 mph (163.514 km/h).

Pos.	#	Driver	Team	Make	Time	Speed
1	18	William Sawalich	Joe Gibbs Racing	Toyota	35.432	101.603

== Race results ==
Fin	St	#	Driver	Team	Make	Laps	Led	Status	Pts
1	2	20	Brent Crews	Venturini Motorsports	Toyota	100	100	Running	
2	1	18	William Sawalich	Joe Gibbs Racing	Toyota	100	0	Running	
3	4	2	Andrés Pérez de Lara	Rev Racing	Chevrolet	100	0	Running	
4	5	15	Kris Wright	Venturini Motorsports	Toyota	100	0	Running	
5	3	16	Kelly Kovski	Kelly Kovski Racing	Chevrolet	100	0	Running	
6	6	6	Lavar Scott (R)	Rev Racing	Chevrolet	100	0	Running	
7	8	55	Taylor Reimer	Venturini Motorsports	Toyota	100	0	Running	
8	12	32	Christian Rose	AM Racing	Ford	100	0	Running	
9	15	25	Toni Breidinger	Venturini Motorsports	Toyota	100	0	Running	
10	13	12	Tim Monroe	Fast Track Racing	Chevrolet	100	0	Running	
11	9	22	Amber Balcaen	Venturini Motorsports	Toyota	100	0	Running	
12	14	11	Cody Dennison (R)	Fast Track Racing	Toyota	96	0	Running	
13	17	31	Brayton Laster	Rise Motorsports	Chevrolet	95	0	Running	
14	16	99	Michael Maples (R)	Fast Track Racing	Chevrolet	80	0	Running	
15	23	03	Alex Clubb	Clubb Racing Inc.	Ford	77	0	Accident	
16	18	06	Austin Vaughan	Wayne Peterson Racing	Chevrolet	46	0	Accident	
17	10	8	Sean Corr	Empire Racing	Chevrolet	38	0	Accident	
18	7	69	Will Kimmel	Kimmel Racing	Ford	31	0	Accident	5
19	11	4	Dale Quarterley	1/4 Ley Racing	Chevrolet	25	0	Accident	4
20	21	0	Nate Moeller	Wayne Peterson Motorsports	Ford	10	0	Accident	3
21	20	10	Daylan Hairston	Fast Track Racing	Ford	5	0	Accident	2
22	19	48	Brad Smith	Brad Smith Motorsports	Ford	4	0	Accident	1
23	22	86	Brian Clubb	Clubb Racing Inc.	Ford	3	0	Accident	0

== Standings after the race ==
Drivers' Championship standings

	Pos	Driver	Points
	1	Andrés Pérez de Lara	764
	2	Lavar Scott	716 (-48)
	3	Kris Wright	697 (–67)
	4	Christian Rose	664 (–100)
	5	Toni Breidinger	659 (–105)
1	6	Amber Balcaen	632 (–132)
	7	Cody Dennison	585 (–179)
	8	Michael Maples	582 (–182)
1	9	Alex Clubb	562 (–202)
4	10	Greg Van Alst	535 (–229)

- Note: Only the first 10 positions are included for the driver standings.

Previous race: 2024 Sprecher 150	ARCA Menards Series; 2024 season	Next race: 2024 General Tire 100 at The Glen
