= James Seeright =

American racing driver

- Born: Winter Haven, Florida, U.S.

CARS Pro Late Model Tour career
- Debut season: 2026
- Years active: 2026–present
- Starts: 6
- Championships: 0
- Wins: 0
- Poles: 0
- Best finish: 14th in 2026
- Statistics up to date as of October 27, 2026.

James Seeright is an American professional stock car racing driver. He currently competes in the zMAX CARS Tour, driving the No. 5 Ford for Hettinger Racing.

Nicknamed Jaws, Seeright has also competed in the Rogers-Dabbs Performance Parts Southern Pro Series and the Wheel Man Sportsman Series, and is a multiple-time Maxxis Nationals winner.

== Motorsports results ==
=== CARS Pro Late Model Tour ===
(key)

CARS Pro Late Model Tour results
Year	Team	No.	Make	1	2	3	4	5	6	7	8	9	10	11	CPLMTC	Pts	Ref
2026	Hettinger Racing	5	Ford	SNM; 12	NSV; 15	CRW; 15	ACE; 18	NWS; 28	HCY; 8	AND	FLC	TCM	NPS	SBO	14th	156	
