= Rob Pellosie =

American racing driver

- Born: Robert Pellosie; July 9, 1980 (age 46); Eustis, Florida, U.S.

ARCA Menards Series career
- 2 races run over 1 year
- Best finish: 79th (2024)
- First race: 2024 Zinsser SmartCoat 150 (Mid-Ohio)
- Last race: 2024 General Tire at The Glen 100 (Watkins Glen)
Wins	Top tens	Poles
0	0	0
- Statistics up to date as of October 23, 2024.

Robert Pellosie (born July 9, 1980) is an American professional stock car racing driver and dentist who last competed part-time in the ARCA Menards Series, driving the No. 31 Chevrolet for Rise Motorsports.

== Racing career ==
In 2024, it was revealed that Pellosie would officially make his debut in the ARCA Menards Series at Mid-Ohio Sports Car Course, driving the No. 31 Chevrolet for Rise Motorsports. After not setting a time in the joint practice and qualifying session, he went on to be officially placed in 26th place after failing to take the start. He returned with the team at Watkins Glen International, where he finished in 25th after running only nine laps due to mechanical issues.

== Personal life ==
Pellosie serves as a dentist in the Tooth Acres Dentistry at Mount Dora, Florida. He is also a former graduate at the Nova Southeastern University College of Dental Medicine.

== Motorsports results ==
=== ARCA Menards Series ===
(key) (Bold – Pole position awarded by qualifying time. Italics – Pole position earned by points standings or practice time. * – Most laps led.)

ARCA Menards Series results
Year	Team	No.	Make	1	2	3	4	5	6	7	8	9	10	11	12	13	14	15	16	17	18	19	20	AMSC	Pts	Ref
2024	Rise Motorsports	31	Chevy	DAY	PHO	TAL	DOV	KAN	CLT	IOW	MOH; 26	BLN	IRP	SLM	ELK	MCH	ISF	MLW	DSF	GLN; 25	BRI	KAN	TOL	79th	37	
