= 2024 Owens Corning 200 =

20th race of the 2024 ARCA Menards Series

Race details
- Race 20 of 20 of the 2024 ARCA Menards Series
- Date: October 5, 2024
- Official name: 3rd Annual Owens Corning 200
- Location: Toledo Speedway in Toledo, Ohio
- Course: Permanent racing facility
- Course length: 0.804 km (0.5 miles)
- Distance: 200 laps, 100 mi (161 km)
- Scheduled distance: 200 laps, 100 mi (161 km)
- Average speed: 55.659 mph (89.574 km/h)

Pole position
Driver	William Sawalich	Joe Gibbs Racing
- Time: 16.000

Most laps led
Driver	William Sawalich	Joe Gibbs Racing
- Laps: 192

Winner
No. 18	William Sawalich	Joe Gibbs Racing

Television in the United States
- Network: FS2
- Announcers: Jamie Little and Phil Parsons

Radio in the United States
- Radio: ARCA Racing Network

The 2024 Owens Corning 200 was the 20th and final stock car race of the 2024 ARCA Menards Series season, and the 3rd iteration of the event. The race was held on Saturday, October 5, 2024, at Toledo Speedway in Toledo, Ohio, a 0.5 mile (0.804 km) permanent oval shaped racetrack. The race took the scheduled 200 laps to complete. William Sawalich, driving for Joe Gibbs Racing, would put on another heater performance, winning the pole and leading a race-high 192 laps to earn his 13th career ARCA Menards Series win, and his ninth of the season. With his win, Sawalich also claimed the owner's championship for the No. 18 car. To fill out the podium, Gio Ruggiero and Kris Wright, both driving for Venturini Motorsports, would finish 2nd and 3rd, respectively.

Meanwhile, Andrés Pérez de Lara, driving for Rev Racing, would clinch the 2024 ARCA Menards Series championship after virtue of starting the race and finishing 6th, 41 points ahead of his teammate Lavar Scott. Pérez became the first-foreign born driver to win the ARCA championship.

== Report ==
=== Background ===
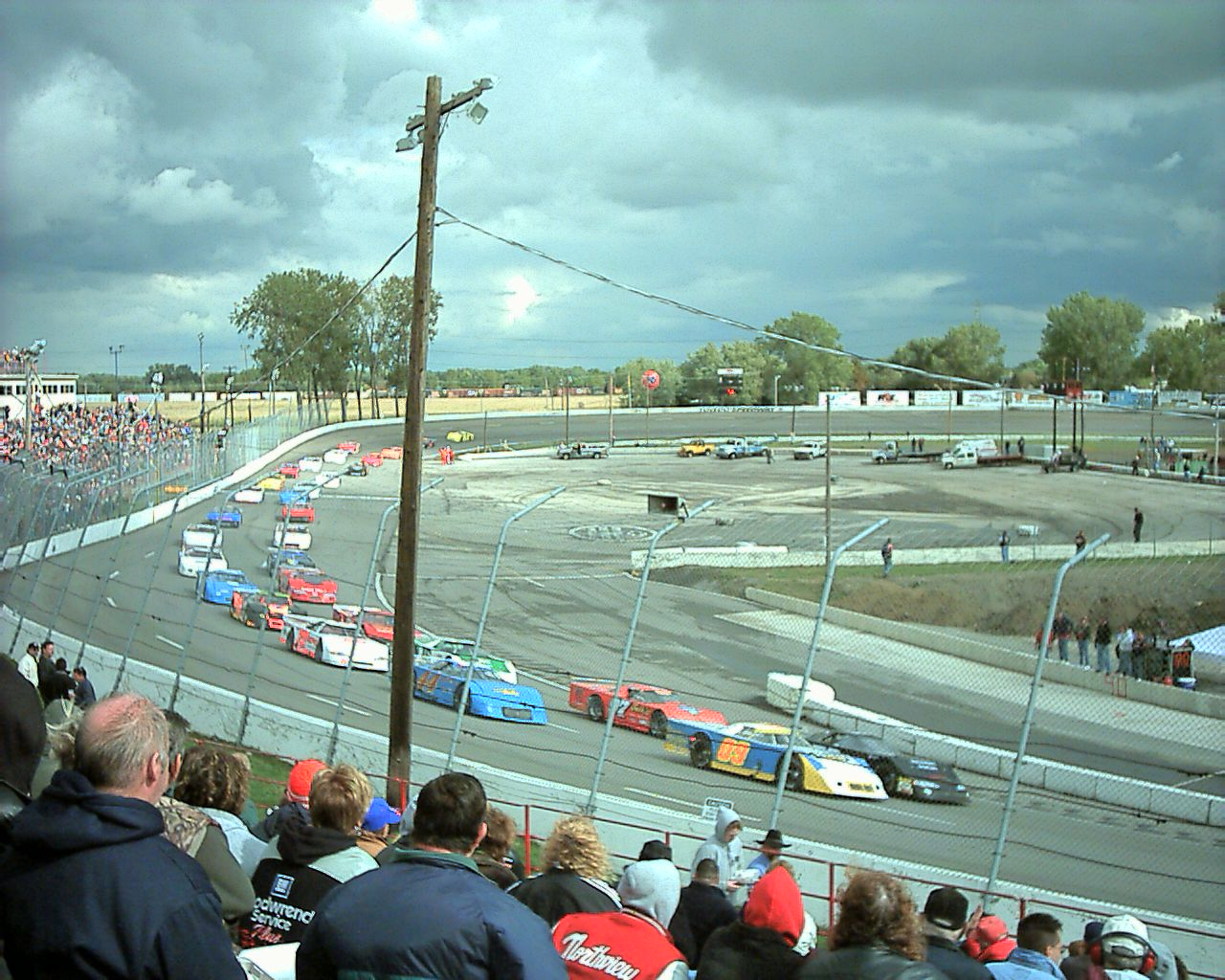
Toledo Speedway, the circuit where the race was held.

Toledo Speedway is a half-mile paved oval racetrack located in Toledo, Ohio, United States. It is owned jointly by Roy Mott and NASCAR. It is operated by NASCAR and run as the sister track to Flat Rock Speedway in Flat Rock, Michigan.

Toledo was one of the oldest tracks to still host an ARCA Menards Series race until 2019. Starting in 2020, after NASCAR bought ARCA, the race became part of the rebranded ARCA Menards Series East (former NASCAR K&N Pro Series East). However, due to COVID-19 related scheduling changes, the track ended up hosting three ARCA races in 2020, and returned on the national schedule in 2021.

==== Entry list ====
- (R) denotes rookie driver.

#	Driver	Team	Make	Sponsor
0	Con Nicolopoulos	Wayne Peterson Racing	Ford	Lake Garnett Grand Prix Revival
01	Matt Kemp	Fast Track Racing	Ford	In Memory of Ron Hutcherson
2	Andrés Pérez de Lara	Rev Racing	Chevrolet	Max Siegel Youth Foundation
03	Alex Clubb	Clubb Racing Inc.	Ford	Race Parts Liquidators
06	Nate Moeller	Wayne Peterson Racing	Toyota	Peterson Motorsports
6	Lavar Scott (R)	Rev Racing	Chevrolet	Special Smiles / Max Siegel Inc.
10	Willie Mullins	Fast Track Racing	Toyota	Crow Wing Recycling
11	Cody Dennison (R)	Fast Track Racing	Toyota	Timcast
12	Tim Monroe	Fast Track Racing	Ford	20 Years Performance Vehicle Works 2004-2024
15	Kris Wright	Venturini Motorsports	Toyota	WrightTrucks.com
18	William Sawalich	Joe Gibbs Racing	Toyota	Starkey / SoundGear
20	Gio Ruggiero	Venturini Motorsports	Toyota	First Auto Group
22	Amber Balcaen	Venturini Motorsports	Toyota	ICON Direct
25	Toni Breidinger	Venturini Motorsports	Toyota	Sunoco
31	Presley Sorah	Rise Motorsports	Chevrolet	HDFive / Tatanka Sauce
32	Christian Rose	AM Racing	Ford	West Virginia Department of Tourism
48	Brad Smith	Brad Smith Motorsports	Ford	Fallen Outdoors / Silver Screens Media
55	Brent Crews	Venturini Motorsports	Toyota	JBL
85	Becca Monopoli	City Garage Motorsports	Ford	Orlando Health
98	Dale Shearer	Shearer Speed Racing	Toyota	Shearer Speed Racing
99	Michael Maples (R)	Fast Track Racing	Chevrolet	Don Ray Petroleum LLC
Official entry list

== Practice ==
The first and only practice session was held on Saturday, October 5, at 11:45 AM EST, and would last for 45 minutes. William Sawalich, driving for Joe Gibbs Racing, would set the fastest time in the session, with a lap of 15.992, and a speed of 112.556 mph (181.141 km/h).

Pos.	#	Driver	Team	Make	Time	Speed
1	18	William Sawalich	Joe Gibbs Racing	Toyota	15.992	112.556
2	20	Gio Ruggiero	Venturini Motorsports	Toyota	16.168	111.331
3	15	Kris Wright	Venturini Motorsports	Toyota	16.257	110.722
Full practice results

== Qualifying ==
Qualifying was held on Saturday, October 5, at 1:00 PM EST. The qualifying system used is a single-car, two-lap based system. Drivers will be on track by themselves and will have two laps to post a qualifying time, and whoever sets the fastest time will win the pole.

William Sawalich, driving for Joe Gibbs Racing, would score the pole for the race, with a lap of 16.000, and a speed of 112.500 mph (181.051 km/h).

=== Qualifying results ===
Pos.	#	Driver	Team	Make	Time	Speed
1	18	William Sawalich	Joe Gibbs Racing	Toyota	16.000	112.500
2	20	Gio Ruggiero	Venturini Motorsports	Toyota	16.098	111.815
3	15	Kris Wright	Venturini Motorsports	Toyota	16.204	111.084
4	2	Andrés Pérez de Lara	Rev Racing	Chevrolet	16.214	111.015
5	55	Brent Crews	Venturini Motorsports	Toyota	16.348	110.105
6	6	Lavar Scott (R)	Rev Racing	Chevrolet	16.377	109.910
7	32	Christian Rose	AM Racing	Ford	16.390	109.823
8	22	Amber Balcaen	Venturini Motorsports	Toyota	16.407	109.709
9	25	Toni Breidinger	Venturini Motorsports	Toyota	16.408	109.703
10	10	Willie Mullins	Fast Track Racing	Toyota	16.654	108.082
11	99	Michael Maples (R)	Fast Track Racing	Chevrolet	17.064	105.485
12	12	Tim Monroe	Fast Track Racing	Ford	17.069	105.454
13	11	Cody Dennison (R)	Fast Track Racing	Toyota	17.092	105.312
14	03	Alex Clubb	Clubb Racing Inc.	Ford	17.549	102.570
15	85	Becca Monopoli	City Garage Motorsports	Ford	17.572	102.436
16	01	Matt Kemp	Fast Track Racing	Ford	17.938	100.346
17	31	Presley Sorah	Rise Motorsports	Chevrolet	18.233	98.722
18	06	Nate Moeller	Wayne Peterson Racing	Toyota	18.720	96.154
19	98	Dale Shearer	Shearer Speed Racing	Toyota	19.081	94.335
20	0	Con Nicolopoulos	Wayne Peterson Racing	Ford	19.220	93.652
21	48	Brad Smith	Brad Smith Motorsports	Ford	20.349	88.456
Official qualifying results

== Race results ==
Fin	St	#	Driver	Team	Make	Laps	Led	Status	Pts
1	1	18	William Sawalich	Joe Gibbs Racing	Toyota	200	192	Running	49
2	2	20	Gio Ruggiero	Venturini Motorsports	Toyota	200	6	Running	43
3	3	15	Kris Wright	Venturini Motorsports	Toyota	200	0	Running	91
4	5	55	Brent Crews	Venturini Motorsports	Toyota	200	0	Running	40
5	6	6	Lavar Scott (R)	Rev Racing	Chevrolet	200	0	Running	89
6	4	2	Andrés Pérez de Lara	Rev Racing	Chevrolet	200	2	Running	89
7	9	25	Toni Breidinger	Venturini Motorsports	Toyota	200	0	Running	87
8	13	11	Cody Dennison (R)	Fast Track Racing	Toyota	200	0	Running	86
9	10	10	Willie Mullins	Fast Track Racing	Toyota	200	0	Running	35
10	7	32	Christian Rose	AM Racing	Ford	200	0	Running	84
11	15	85	Becca Monopoli	City Garage Motorsports	Ford	192	0	Running	33
12	21	48	Brad Smith	Brad Smith Motorsports	Ford	184	0	Running	82
13	8	22	Amber Balcaen	Venturini Motorsports	Toyota	177	0	Accident	81
14	17	06	Nate Moeller	Wayne Peterson Racing	Toyota	173	0	Running	30
15	11	99	Michael Maples (R)	Fast Track Racing	Chevrolet	168	0	Engine	79
16	12	12	Tim Monroe	Fast Track Racing	Ford	154	0	Accident	28
17	16	31	Presley Sorah	Rise Motorsports	Chevrolet	93	0	Engine	27
18	19	98	Dale Shearer	Shearer Speed Racing	Toyota	41	0	Mechanical	26
19	14	03	Alex Clubb	Clubb Racing Inc.	Ford	25	0	Wheel Bearing	75
20	20	0	Con Nicolopoulos	Wayne Peterson Racing	Ford	23	0	Mechanical	24
21	18	01	Matt Kemp	Fast Track Racing	Ford	7	0	Quit	23
Official race results

== Standings after the race ==
Drivers' Championship standings

Pos	Driver	Points
1	Andrés Pérez de Lara	956
2	Lavar Scott	915 (-41)
3	Kris Wright	877 (–79)
4	Toni Breidinger	837 (–119)
5	Christian Rose	832 (–124)
6	Amber Balcaen	786 (–170)
7	Cody Dennison	740 (–216)
8	Michael Maples	733 (–223)
9	Alex Clubb	702 (–254)
10	William Sawalich	689 (–267)

- Note: Only the first 10 positions are included for the driver standings.

Previous race: 2024 Reese's 150	ARCA Menards Series; 2024 season	Next race: 2025 Ride the 'Dente 200
