= 2024 Springfield ARCA 100 =

14th race of the 2024 ARCA Menards Series

Race details
- Race 14 of 20 of the 2024 ARCA Menards Series
- Date: August 18, 2024
- Official name: 42nd Annual Springfield ARCA 100
- Location: Illinois State Fairgrounds Racetrack in Springfield, Illinois
- Course: Permanent racing facility
- Course length: 1 miles (1.6 km)
- Distance: 105 laps, 105 mi (168 km)
- Scheduled distance: 100 laps, 100 mi (160 km)
- Average speed: 66.026 mph (106.259 km/h)

Pole position
Driver	William Sawalich	Joe Gibbs Racing
- Time: 34.009

Most laps led
Driver	William Sawalich	Joe Gibbs Racing
- Laps: 105

Winner
No. 18	William Sawalich	Joe Gibbs Racing

Television in the United States
- Network: FS1
- Announcers: Eric Brennan and Phil Parsons

Radio in the United States
- Radio: ARCA Racing Network

The 2024 Springfield ARCA 100 was the 14th stock car race of the 2024 ARCA Menards Series season, and the 42nd iteration of the event. The race was held on Sunday, August 18, 2024, at the Illinois State Fairgrounds Racetrack in Springfield, Illinois, a 1-mile (1.6 km) permanent oval-shaped dirt track. The race was originally scheduled to be contested over 100 laps, but was increased to 105 laps due to a late-race caution. William Sawalich, driving for Joe Gibbs Racing, would continue his consistent domination in the ARCA Menards Series, winning the pole and leading every lap of the race to earn his 10th career ARCA Menards Series win, and his sixth of the season. Isabella Robusto finished in 2nd, becoming the fourth female driver to finish runner-up in an ARCA race, alongside Hailie Deegan, Erin Crocker, and Shawna Robinson. Taylor Reimer finished in 3rd, marking the first time in series history where two female drivers finished inside the top three in the same ARCA race. Along with this, Venturini Motorsports fielded four entries for four females in the race (Amber Balcaen, Toni Breidinger, Robusto, and Reimer), the first time in team history to field four females in the same event.

== Report ==
=== Background ===
Illinois State Fairgrounds Racetrack is a one mile long clay oval motor racetrack on the Illinois State Fairgrounds in Springfield, the state capital. It is frequently nicknamed The Springfield Mile. Constructed in the late 19th century and reconstructed in 1927, the track has hosted competitive auto racing since 1910, making it one of the oldest speedways in the United States. The original mile track utilized the current frontstretch and the other side was behind the current grandstands and the straightaways were connected by tight turns. It is the oldest track to continually host national championship dirt track racing, holding its first national championship race in 1934 under the American Automobile Association banner. It is the home of five world records for automobile racing, making it one of the fastest dirt tracks in the world. Since 1993, the venue is managed by Bob Sargent's Track Enterprises.

The Illinois State Fair mile currently hosts the Allen Crowe Memorial 100 ARCA stock car race, USAC Silver Crown dirt cars, UMP Late Models and Modifieds and the A.M.A. Grand National Championship. The only driver who has won races in three disciplines of racing in Ken Schrader who won in ARCA cars (1998), UMP Modifieds (1998), and midgets.

==== Entry list ====
- (R) denotes rookie driver.

#	Driver	Team	Make	Sponsor
2	Andrés Pérez de Lara	Rev Racing	Chevrolet	Max Siegel Inc.
03	Alex Clubb	Clubb Racing Inc.	Ford	A. Clubb Lawn Care & Landscaping
06	Nate Moeller	Wayne Peterson Racing	Toyota	Ocean Pipe Works
6	Lavar Scott (R)	Rev Racing	Chevrolet	Max Siegel Inc.
8	Sean Corr	Empire Racing	Chevrolet	NESCO Bus Sales
10	Bryce Haugeberg	Fast Track Racing	Ford	Brenco / Haugeberg Farms / UTI
11	Cody Dennison (R)	Fast Track Racing	Toyota	Timcast
12	Tim Monroe	Fast Track Racing	Chevrolet	Illinois Trucking Association
15	Kris Wright	Venturini Motorsports	Toyota	FNB Corporation
16	Kelly Kovski	Kelly Kovski Racing	Chevrolet	BRANDT / Schluckebier Farms
18	William Sawalich	Joe Gibbs Racing	Toyota	Starkey / SoundGear
20	Isabella Robusto	Venturini Motorsports	Toyota	JBL
22	Amber Balcaen	Venturini Motorsports	Toyota	ICON Direct
25	Toni Breidinger	Venturini Motorsports	Toyota	Sunoco
31	Brayton Laster	Rise Motorsports	Chevrolet	@Cyber_Fox_ on X / BlueChew
32	Christian Rose	AM Racing	Ford	West Virginia Department of Tourism
48	Brad Smith	Brad Smith Motorsports	Ford	Silver Screens Media / Ski's Graphics
55	Taylor Reimer	Venturini Motorsports	Toyota	BuzzBallz
86	Brian Clubb	Clubb Racing Inc.	Ford	Race Parts Liquidators
99	Michael Maples (R)	Fast Track Racing	Chevrolet	Don Ray Petroleum LLC
Official entry list

== Practice ==
The first and only practice session was held on Sunday, August 18, at 10:00 AM CST, and would last for 30 minutes. William Sawalich, driving for Joe Gibbs Racing, would set the fastest time in the session, with a lap of 33.950, and a speed of 106.038 mph (170.652 km/h).

Pos.	#	Driver	Team	Make	Time	Speed
1	18	William Sawalich	Joe Gibbs Racing	Toyota	33.950	106.038
2	15	Kris Wright	Venturini Motorsports	Toyota	34.158	105.393
3	6	Lavar Scott (R)	Rev Racing	Chevrolet	34.183	105.316
Full practice results

== Qualifying ==
Qualifying was held on Sunday, August 18, at 11:15 AM CST. The qualifying system used is a single-car, one-lap based system. Drivers will be on track by themselves and will have one lap to post a qualifying time, and whoever sets the fastest time will win the pole.

William Sawalich, driving for Joe Gibbs Racing, would score the pole for the race, with a lap of 34.009, and a speed of 105.854 mph (170.355 km/h).

=== Qualifying results ===
Pos.	#	Driver	Team	Make	Time	Speed
1	18	William Sawalich	Joe Gibbs Racing	Toyota	34.009	105.854
2	16	Kelly Kovski	Kelly Kovski Racing	Chevrolet	34.842	103.324
3	55	Taylor Reimer	Venturini Motorsports	Toyota	35.197	102.281
4	2	Andrés Pérez de Lara	Rev Racing	Chevrolet	35.254	102.116
5	15	Kris Wright	Venturini Motorsports	Toyota	35.318	101.931
6	6	Lavar Scott (R)	Rev Racing	Chevrolet	35.377	101.761
7	32	Christian Rose	AM Racing	Ford	35.459	101.526
8	8	Sean Corr	Empire Racing	Chevrolet	35.860	100.390
9	22	Amber Balcaen	Venturini Motorsports	Toyota	35.987	100.036
10	03	Alex Clubb	Clubb Racing Inc.	Ford	36.118	99.673
11	11	Cody Dennison (R)	Fast Track Racing	Toyota	36.213	99.412
12	10	Bryce Haugeberg	Fast Track Racing	Ford	36.604	98.350
13	99	Michael Maples (R)	Fast Track Racing	Chevrolet	36.605	98.347
14	12	Tim Monroe	Fast Track Racing	Chevrolet	37.145	96.917
15	48	Brad Smith	Brad Smith Motorsports	Ford	37.357	96.367
16	06	Nate Moeller	Wayne Peterson Racing	Toyota	41.580	86.580
17	86	Brian Clubb	Clubb Racing Inc.	Ford	44.089	81.653
18	31	Brayton Laster	Rise Motorsports	Chevrolet	2:19.504	25.806
19	20	Isabella Robusto	Venturini Motorsports	Toyota	–	–
20	25	Toni Breidinger	Venturini Motorsports	Toyota	–	–
Official qualifying results

== Race results ==
Fin	St	#	Driver	Team	Make	Laps	Led	Status	Pts
1	1	18	William Sawalich	Joe Gibbs Racing	Toyota	105	105	Running	49
2	19	20	Isabella Robusto	Venturini Motorsports	Toyota	105	0	Running	42
3	3	55	Taylor Reimer	Venturini Motorsports	Toyota	105	0	Running	41
4	2	16	Kelly Kovski	Kelly Kovski Racing	Chevrolet	105	0	Running	40
5	6	6	Lavar Scott (R)	Rev Racing	Chevrolet	105	0	Running	39
6	20	25	Toni Breidinger	Venturini Motorsports	Toyota	105	0	Running	38
7	5	15	Kris Wright	Venturini Motorsports	Toyota	105	0	Running	37
8	9	22	Amber Balcaen	Venturini Motorsports	Toyota	105	0	Running	36
9	7	32	Christian Rose	AM Racing	Ford	104	0	Accident	35
10	14	12	Tim Monroe	Fast Track Racing	Chevrolet	104	0	Running	34
11	8	8	Sean Corr	Empire Racing	Chevrolet	104	0	Running	33
12	11	11	Cody Dennison (R)	Fast Track Racing	Toyota	104	0	Running	32
13	13	99	Michael Maples (R)	Fast Track Racing	Chevrolet	103	0	Running	31
14	18	31	Brayton Laster	Rise Motorsports	Chevrolet	103	0	Running	30
15	4	2	Andrés Pérez de Lara	Rev Racing	Chevrolet	60	0	Running	29
16	10	03	Alex Clubb	Clubb Racing Inc.	Ford	58	0	Accident	28
17	12	10	Bryce Haugeberg	Fast Track Racing	Ford	33	0	Engine	27
18	16	06	Nate Moeller	Wayne Peterson Racing	Toyota	22	0	Oil Line	26
19	15	48	Brad Smith	Brad Smith Motorsports	Ford	13	0	Mechanical	25
20	17	86	Brian Clubb	Clubb Racing Inc.	Ford	1	0	Transmission	24
Official race results

== Standings after the race ==
Drivers' Championship standings

	Pos	Driver	Points
	1	Andrés Pérez de Lara	635
	2	Lavar Scott	587 (-48)
3	3	Kris Wright	567 (–68)
1	4	Christian Rose	542 (–93)
1	5	Toni Breidinger	541 (–94)
3	6	Greg Van Alst	535 (–100)
	7	Amber Balcaen	525 (–110)
	8	Michael Maples	476 (–159)
	9	Cody Dennison	472 (–163)
	10	Alex Clubb	458 (–177)

- Note: Only the first 10 positions are included for the driver standings.

Previous race: 2024 Henry Ford Health 200	ARCA Menards Series; 2024 season	Next race: 2024 Sprecher 150
