= Daylan Hairston =

American racing driver

- Born: January 4, 1991 (age 35); Crawford, Mississippi, U.S.

ARCA Menards Series career
- 1 race run over 1 year
- Best finish: 103rd (2024)
- First race: 2024 Southern Illinois 100 (DuQuoin)
Wins	Top tens	Poles
0	0	0
- Statistics up to date as of September 10, 2024.

Daylan Hairston (born January 4, 1991) is an American professional stock car racing driver and crew chief who last competed part-time in the ARCA Menards Series, driving the No. 10 Ford for Fast Track Racing.

== Racing career ==
In 2024, Hairston participated in pre-season testing for the ARCA Menards Series at Daytona International Speedway driving for Fast Track Racing in the No. 10 Chevrolet, and placed 44th in the overall results between the two testing days. It would later be revealed that Hairston, who had served as a crew chief for Fast Track the previous year, had plans on making his debut in the series at some point during the year. Several months later, he would make his debut with the team at the DuQuoin State Fairgrounds dirt track, driving the No. 10 Ford, where after placing 21st in the lone practice session, he qualified in twentieth and finished in 21st after running only five laps due to mechanical issues.

== Motorsports results ==
=== ARCA Menards Series ===
(key) (Bold – Pole position awarded by qualifying time. Italics – Pole position earned by points standings or practice time. * – Most laps led.)

ARCA Menards Series results
Year	Team	No.	Make	1	2	3	4	5	6	7	8	9	10	11	12	13	14	15	16	17	18	19	20	AMSC	Pts	Ref
2024	Fast Track Racing	10	Ford	DAY	PHO	TAL	DOV	KAN	CLT	IOW	MOH	BLN	IRP	SLM	ELK	MCH	ISF	MLW	DSF; 21	GLN	BRI	KAN	TOL	103rd	23	
