= 2024 Sprecher 150 =

15th race of the 2024 ARCA Menards Series

Race details
- Race 15 of 20 of the 2024 ARCA Menards Series; Race 7 of 8 of the 2024 ARCA Menards Series East
- Date: August 25, 2024
- Official name: 4th Annual Sprecher 150
- Location: Milwaukee Mile in West Allis, Wisconsin
- Course: Permanent racing facility
- Course length: 1 miles (1.6 km)
- Distance: 150 laps, 150 mi (240 km)
- Scheduled distance: 150 laps, 150 mi (240 km)

Pole position
Driver	William Sawalich	Joe Gibbs Racing
- Time: 29.002

Most laps led
Driver	William Sawalich	Joe Gibbs Racing
- Laps: 149

Winner
No. 18	William Sawalich	Joe Gibbs Racing

Television in the United States
- Network: FS1
- Announcers: Jamie Little, Phil Parsons, and Trevor Bayne

Radio in the United States
- Radio: MRN

The 2024 Sprecher 150 was the 15th stock car race of the 2024 ARCA Menards Series season, the 7th race of the 2024 ARCA Menards Series East season, and the 4th iteration of the event. The race will be held on Sunday, August 25, 2024, at The Milwaukee Mile in West Allis, Wisconsin, a 1-mile (1.6 km) permanent oval-shaped racetrack. The race took the scheduled 150 laps to complete. William Sawalich, driving for Joe Gibbs Racing, would hold off a fierce battle with Connor Zilisch, and earned his eleventh career ARCA Menards Series win, his sixth career ARCA Menards Series East win, and his seventh of the season. Sawalich would also dominate the entire race, leading a race-high 149 laps. To fill out the podium, Zlilich, driving for Pinnacle Racing Group and Lavar Scott, driving for Rev Racing, would finish 2nd and 3rd, respectively.

== Report ==
=== Background ===
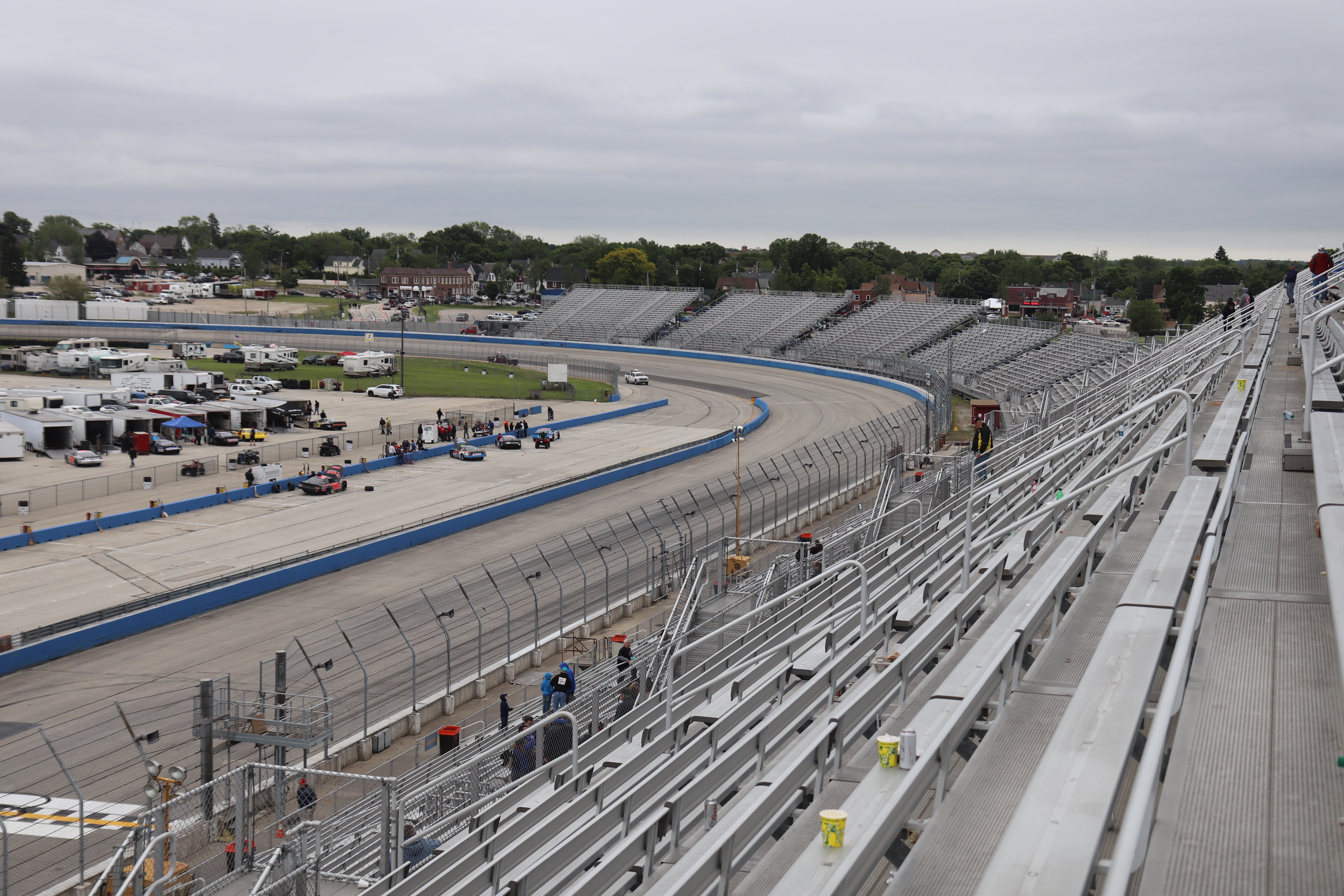
Milwaukee Mile, the circuit where the race was held.

The Milwaukee Mile is a 1.015 mi (1.633 km) oval race track in the central United States, located on the grounds of the Wisconsin State Fair Park in West Allis, Wisconsin, a suburb west of Milwaukee. Its grandstand and bleachers seats approximately 37,000 spectators. Opened in 1903 as a dirt track, it was paved in 1954. In addition to the oval, there is a 1.8 mi (2.9 km) road circuit located in the infield.

As the oldest operating motor speedway in the world, the Milwaukee Mile has hosted at least one auto race every year from 1903 to 2024 (except during U.S. involvement in World War II). The track has held events sanctioned by major bodies, such as the AAA, USAC, NASCAR, CART/CCWS, and the IndyCar Series. There have also been many races in regional series such as ARTGO.

==== Entry list ====
- (R) denotes rookie driver.

#	Driver	Team	Make	Sponsor
2	Andrés Pérez de Lara	Rev Racing	Chevrolet	Max Siegel Inc.
03	Alex Clubb	Clubb Racing Inc.	Ford	A. Clubb Lawn Care & Landscaping
06	Nate Moeller	Wayne Peterson Racing	Toyota	Ocean Pipe Works
6	Lavar Scott (R)	Rev Racing	Chevrolet	Max Siegel Inc.
10	Cody Dennison (R)	Fast Track Racing	Toyota	Timcast
11	Zachary Tinkle	Fast Track Racing	Toyota	Racing for Rescues
12	Ryan Roulette	Fast Track Racing	Ford	Bellator Recruiting Academy / VFW
15	Kris Wright	Venturini Motorsports	Toyota	FNB Corporation
17	Marco Andretti	Cook Racing Technologies	Chevrolet	Group 1001
18	William Sawalich	Joe Gibbs Racing	Toyota	Starkey / SoundGear
20	Gio Ruggiero (R)	Venturini Motorsports	Toyota	JBL
22	Amber Balcaen	Venturini Motorsports	Toyota	ICON Direct
25	Toni Breidinger	Venturini Motorsports	Toyota	Gener8tor
28	Connor Zilisch (R)	Pinnacle Racing Group	Chevrolet	Chevrolet / Silver Hare Development
31	Rita Goulet	Rise Motorsports	Chevrolet	NationalPolice.org
32	Christian Rose	AM Racing	Ford	West Virginia Department of Tourism
33	Lawless Alan	Reaume Brothers Racing	Ford	AutoParkIt.com
39	D. L. Wilson	CW Motorsports	Toyota	Heart O' Texas Speedway / ETR
48	Brad Smith	Brad Smith Motorsports	Ford	Ski's Graphics
55	Dean Thompson	Venturini Motorsports	Toyota	Thompson Pipe Group
86	Brian Clubb	Clubb Racing Inc.	Ford	Race Parts Liquidators
93	Tyler Tomassi	CW Motorsports	Ford	Tomassi Law
95	Andrew Patterson	MAN Motorsports	Toyota	SCS Gearbox / Winsupply
99	Michael Maples (R)	Fast Track Racing	Chevrolet	Don Ray Petroleum LLC
Official entry list

== Practice ==
The first and only practice session was held on Saturday, August 24, at 1:00 PM CST, and would last for 45 minutes. William Sawalich, driving for Joe Gibbs Racing, would set the fastest time in the session, with a lap of 29.213, and a speed of 125.081 mph (201.298 km/h).

Pos.	#	Driver	Team	Make	Time	Speed
1	18	William Sawalich	Joe Gibbs Racing	Toyota	29.213	125.081
2	28	Connor Zilisch (R)	Pinnacle Racing Group	Chevrolet	29.624	123.346
3	20	Gio Ruggiero (R)	Venturini Motorsports	Toyota	29.722	122.939
Full practice results

== Qualifying ==
Qualifying was held on Saturday, August 24, at 2:00 PM CST. The qualifying system used is a multi-car, multi-lap based system. All drivers will be on track for a 20-minute timed session, and whoever sets the fastest time in that session will win the pole.

William Sawalich, driving for Joe Gibbs Racing, would score the pole for the race, with a lap of 29.002, and a speed of 125.991 mph (202.763 km/h).

=== Qualifying results ===
Pos.	#	Driver	Team	Make	Time	Speed
1	18	William Sawalich	Joe Gibbs Racing	Toyota	29.002	125.991
2	28	Connor Zilisch (R)	Pinnacle Racing Group	Chevrolet	29.366	124.430
3	33	Lawless Alan	Reaume Brothers Racing	Ford	29.594	123.471
4	2	Andrés Pérez de Lara	Rev Racing	Chevrolet	29.697	123.043
5	20	Gio Ruggiero (R)	Venturini Motorsports	Toyota	29.747	122.836
6	55	Dean Thompson	Venturini Motorsports	Toyota	29.906	122.183
7	15	Kris Wright	Venturini Motorsports	Toyota	29.980	121.881
8	6	Lavar Scott (R)	Rev Racing	Chevrolet	30.001	121.796
9	22	Amber Balcaen	Venturini Motorsports	Toyota	30.015	121.739
10	32	Christian Rose	AM Racing	Ford	30.061	121.553
11	17	Marco Andretti	Cook Racing Technologies	Chevrolet	30.305	120.574
12	10	Cody Dennison (R)	Fast Track Racing	Toyota	31.018	117.803
13	99	Michael Maples	Fast Track Racing	Chevrolet	31.285	116.797
14	95	Andrew Patterson	MAN Motorsports	Toyota	31.304	116.726
15	11	Zachary Tinkle	Fast Track Racing	Toyota	31.333	116.618
16	39	D. L. Wilson	CW Motorsports	Toyota	31.550	115.816
17	93	Tyler Tomassi	CW Motorsports	Ford	31.704	115.254
18	12	Ryan Roulette	Fast Track Racing	Ford	31.817	114.844
19	03	Alex Clubb	Clubb Racing Inc.	Ford	32.274	113.218
20	48	Brad Smith	Brad Smith Motorsports	Ford	34.184	106.892
21	06	Nate Moeller	Wayne Peterson Racing	Toyota	35.957	101.621
22	25	Toni Breidinger	Venturini Motorsports	Toyota	–	–
23	31	Rita Goulet	Rise Motorsports	Chevrolet	–	–
24	86	Brian Clubb	Clubb Racing Inc.	Ford	–	–
Official qualifying results

== Race results ==
Fin	St	#	Driver	Team	Make	Laps	Led	Status	Pts
1	1	18	William Sawalich	Joe Gibbs Racing	Toyota	150	149	Running	49
2	2	28	Connor Zilisch	Pinnacle Racing Group	Chevrolet	150	1	Running	43
3	8	6	Lavar Scott	Rev Racing	Chevrolet	150	0	Running	41
4	7	15	Kris Wright	Venturini Motorsports	Toyota	150	0	Running	40
5	3	33	Lawless Alan	Reaume Brothers Racing	Ford	150	0	Running	39
6	4	2	Andrés Pérez de Lara	Rev Racing	Chevrolet	149	0	Running	38
7	6	55	Dean Thompson	Venturini Motorsports	Toyota	149	0	Running	37
8	10	32	Christian Rose	AM Racing	Ford	149	0	Running	36
9	5	20	Gio Ruggiero	Venturini Motorsports	Toyota	149	0	Running	35
10	11	17	Marco Andretti	Cook Racing Technologies	Chevrolet	148	0	Running	34
11	22	25	Toni Breidinger	Venturini Motorsports	Toyota	146	0	Running	33
12	15	11	Zachary Tinkle	Fast Track Racing	Toyota	145	0	Running	32
13	12	10	Cody Dennison	Fast Track Racing	Toyota	145	0	Running	31
14	16	39	D.L. Wilson	CW Motorsports	Toyota	144	0	Running	30
15	17	93	Tyler Tomassi	CW Motorsports	Ford	144	0	Running	29
16	14	95	Andrew Patterson	MAN Motorsports	Toyota	143	0	Running	28
17	18	12	Ryan Roulette	Fast Track Racing	Ford	142	0	Running	27
18	13	99	Michael Maples	Fast Track Racing	Chevrolet	141	0	Running	26
19	19	03	Alex Clubb	Clubb Racing Inc.	Ford	136	0	Running	25
20	9	22	Amber Balcaen	Venturini Motorsports	Toyota	87	0	Ball Joint	24
21	21	06	Nate Moeller	Wayne Peterson Racing	Ford	52	0	Mechanical	23
22	20	48	Brad Smith	Brad Smith Motorsports	Ford	13	0	Overheating	22
23	23	31	Rita Goulet	Rise Motorsports	Chevrolet	1	0	Clutch	21
24	24	86	Brian Clubb	Clubb Racing Inc.	Ford	0	0	Did Not Start	20

Previous race: 2024 Springfield ARCA 100	ARCA Menards Series; 2024 season	Next race: 2024 Southern Illinois 100

Previous race: 2024 Circle City 200	ARCA Menards Series East; 2024 season	Next race: 2024 Bush's Beans 200
