= 2024 Zinsser SmartCoat 150 =

8th race of the 2024 ARCA Menards Series

Race details
- Race 8 of 20 of the 2024 ARCA Menards Series
- Date: June 21, 2024
- Official name: 4th Annual Zinsser SmartCoat 150
- Location: Mid-Ohio Sports Car Course in Lexington, Ohio
- Course: Permanent racing facility
- Course length: 2.258 miles (3.634 km)
- Distance: 42 laps, 94 mi (152 km)
- Scheduled distance: 42 laps, 94 mi (152 km)

Pole position
Driver	Connor Mosack	Pinnacle Racing Group
- Time: 1:27.815

Most laps led
Driver	Brent Crews	Venturini Motorsports
- Laps: 25

Winner
No. 18	William Sawalich	Joe Gibbs Racing

Television in the United States
- Network: FS2
- Announcers: Jamie Little, Phil Parsons, and Trevor Bayne

Radio in the United States
- Radio: MRN

The 2024 Zinsser SmartCoat 150 was the 8th stock car race of the 2024 ARCA Menards Series season, and the 4th iteration of the event. The race was held on Friday, June 21, 2024, at Mid-Ohio Sports Car Course in Lexington, Ohio, a 2.258-mile (3.634 km) permanent road course. The race took the scheduled 42 laps to complete. In an action-packed race with late controversy, William Sawalich, driving for Joe Gibbs Racing, would hold off a challenging Brent Crews on the final lap to earn his sixth career ARCA Menards Series win, and his second of the season. Crews dominated the majority of the race, who started 3rd and led a race-high 25 laps, before making contact with Connor Mosack on the final restart and finishing 2nd. To fill out the podium, Gio Ruggiero, driving for Venturini Motorsports, would finish in 3rd, respectively.

On the final restart with four laps to go, Connor Mosack, who was in 2nd, was penalized by ARCA for jumping the start, and was ordered to serve a 30-second penalty on pit road. Mosack elected to stay on the racetrack, crossing the line in first but was later black flagged, giving the win to 2nd-place driver, William Sawalich.

== Report ==
Mid-Ohio Sports Car Course is a road course auto racing facility located in Troy Township, Morrow County, Ohio, United States, just outside the village of Lexington. Mid-Ohio has also colloquially become a term for the entire north-central region of the state, from south of Sandusky to the north of Columbus. It hosts a number of racing series such as IndyCar, IMSA WeatherTech Sportscar Championship, and the NASCAR Craftsman Truck Series, along with other club events such has SCCA and National Auto Sport Association.

=== Entry list ===
- (R) denotes rookie driver.

#	Driver	Team	Make	Sponsor
2	Andrés Pérez de Lara	Rev Racing	Chevrolet	Max Siegel Inc.
03	Alex Clubb	Clubb Racing Inc.	Ford	A. Clubb Lawn Care & Landscaping
4	Dale Quarterley	1/4 Ley Racing	Chevrolet	Van Dyk Recycling Solutions
06	Nate Moeller	Wayne Peterson Racing	Ford	Ocean Pipe Works
6	Lavar Scott (R)	Rev Racing	Chevrolet	Max Siegel Inc.
10	Brad Perez	Fast Track Racing	Toyota	Race City Graphics / Sebetka Bail Bonds
11	Cody Dennison (R)	Fast Track Racing	Toyota	Timcast
12	Mike Basham	Fast Track Racing	Toyota	Work for Green Shield Deck Builders
15	Kris Wright	Venturini Motorsports	Toyota	FNB Corporation
17	Marco Andretti	Cook Racing Technologies	Toyota	Group 1001
18	William Sawalich	Joe Gibbs Racing	Toyota	Starkey / SoundGear
20	Gio Ruggiero	Venturini Motorsports	Toyota	First Auto Group
22	Amber Balcaen	Venturini Motorsports	Toyota	ICON Direct
25	Toni Breidinger	Venturini Motorsports	Toyota	Ruedebusch Development
27	Tim Richmond	Richmond Motorsports	Toyota	Richmond Motorsports
28	Connor Mosack	Pinnacle Racing Group	Chevrolet	Chevrolet / Silver Hare Development
30	Conor Daly	Rette Jones Racing	Ford	Polkadot
31	Rob Pellosie	Rise Motorsports	Chevrolet	Tooth Acres Dentistry
32	Christian Rose	AM Racing	Ford	West Virginia Department of Tourism
35	Greg Van Alst	Greg Van Alst Motorsports	Ford	CB Fabricating / Top Choice Fence
44	Thomas Annunziata	Jeff McClure Racing	Ford	Chipoys / Franklin Road Apparel
48	Brad Smith	Brad Smith Motorsports	Ford	Ski's Graphics
55	Brent Crews	Venturini Motorsports	Toyota	Mobil 1
86	Chris Golden	Clubb Racing Inc.	Ford	CRS Suspension
95	Andrew Patterson	MAN Motorsports	Toyota	Forgeline / Winsupply
99	Michael Maples (R)	Fast Track Racing	Chevrolet	Don Ray Petroleum LLC
Official entry list

== Practice/Qualifying ==
Practice and qualifying were both held on Friday, June 21, at 12:35 PM EST, as a combined session which was 60 minutes long.

Connor Mosack, driving for Pinnacle Racing Group, would score the pole for the race, with a lap of 1:27.815, and a speed of 92.567 mph (148.972 km/h).

=== Qualifying results ===
Pos.	#	Driver	Team	Make	Time	Speed
1	28	Connor Mosack	Pinnacle Racing Group	Chevrolet	1:27.815	92.567
2	18	William Sawalich	Joe Gibbs Racing	Toyota	1:28.310	92.048
3	55	Brent Crews	Venturini Motorsports	Toyota	1:28.466	91.886
4	4	Dale Quarterley	1/4 Ley Racing	Chevrolet	1:29.347	90.980
5	44	Thomas Annunziata	Jeff McClure Racing	Ford	1:29.579	90.744
6	17	Marco Andretti	Cook Racing Technologies	Toyota	1:29.988	90.332
7	20	Gio Ruggiero	Venturini Motorsports	Toyota	1:30.336	89.984
8	2	Andrés Pérez de Lara	Rev Racing	Chevrolet	1:30.594	89.728
9	30	Conor Daly	Rette Jones Racing	Ford	1:30.622	89.700
10	15	Kris Wright	Venturini Motorsports	Toyota	1:31.069	89.260
11	6	Lavar Scott (R)	Rev Racing	Chevrolet	1:31.192	89.139
12	35	Greg Van Alst	Greg Van Alst Motorsports	Ford	1:32.505	87.874
13	10	Brad Perez	Fast Track Racing	Toyota	1:33.161	87.255
14	95	Andrew Patterson	MAN Motorsports	Toyota	1:33.197	87.222
15	22	Amber Balcaen	Venturini Motorsports	Toyota	1:33.384	87.047
16	25	Toni Breidinger	Venturini Motorsports	Toyota	1:33.499	86.940
17	27	Tim Richmond	Richmond Motorsports	Toyota	1:34.633	85.898
18	32	Christian Rose	AM Racing	Ford	1:36.198	84.501
19	11	Cody Dennison (R)	Fast Track Racing	Toyota	1:37.323	83.524
20	99	Michael Maples (R)	Fast Track Racing	Chevrolet	1:52.636	72.169
21	12	Mike Basham	Fast Track Racing	Toyota	1:57.442	69.215
22	31	Rob Pellosie	Rise Motorsports	Chevrolet	–	–
23	06	Nate Moeller	Wayne Peterson Racing	Ford	–	–
24	03	Alex Clubb	Clubb Racing Inc.	Ford	–	–
25	48	Brad Smith	Brad Smith Motorsports	Ford	–	–
26	86	Chris Golden	Clubb Racing Inc.	Ford	–	–
Official qualifying results

== Race results ==
Fin	St	#	Driver	Team	Make	Laps	Led	Status	Pts
1	2	18	William Sawalich	Joe Gibbs Racing	Toyota	42	4	Running	47
2	3	55	Brent Crews	Venturini Motorsports	Toyota	42	25	Running	44
3	7	20	Gio Ruggiero	Venturini Motorsports	Toyota	42	0	Running	41
4	5	44	Thomas Annunziata	Jeff McClure Racing	Ford	42	0	Running	40
5	6	17	Marco Andretti	Cook Racing Technologies	Toyota	42	0	Running	39
6	8	2	Andrés Pérez de Lara	Rev Racing	Chevrolet	42	0	Running	38
7	16	25	Toni Breidinger	Venturini Motorsports	Toyota	42	0	Running	37
8	9	30	Conor Daly	Rette Jones Racing	Ford	42	0	Running	36
9	13	10	Brad Perez	Fast Track Racing	Toyota	42	0	Running	35
10	12	35	Greg Van Alst	Greg Van Alst Motorsports	Ford	42	0	Running	34
11	18	32	Christian Rose	AM Racing	Ford	42	0	Running	33
12	17	27	Tim Richmond	Richmond Motorsports	Toyota	42	0	Running	32
13	1	28	Connor Mosack	Pinnacle Racing Group	Chevrolet	42	13	Running	32
14	11	6	Lavar Scott (R)	Rev Racing	Chevrolet	41	0	Running	30
15	19	11	Cody Dennison (R)	Fast Track Racing	Toyota	41	0	Running	29
16	15	22	Amber Balcaen	Venturini Motorsports	Toyota	40	0	Running	28
17	20	99	Michael Maples (R)	Fast Track Racing	Chevrolet	38	0	Running	27
18	10	15	Kris Wright	Venturini Motorsports	Toyota	36	0	DNF	26
19	24	03	Alex Clubb	Clubb Racing Inc.	Ford	26	0	Transmission	25
20	21	12	Mike Basham	Fast Track Racing	Toyota	25	0	DNF	24
21	23	06	Nate Moeller	Wayne Peterson Racing	Ford	20	0	DNF	23
22	14	95	Andrew Patterson	MAN Motorsports	Toyota	16	0	Oil	22
23	4	4	Dale Quarterley	1/4 Ley Racing	Chevrolet	6	0	Engine	21
24	25	48	Brad Smith	Brad Smith Motorsports	Ford	1	0	DNF	20
25	26	86	Chris Golden	Clubb Racing Inc.	Ford	0	0	DNF	19
26	22	31	Rob Pellosie	Rise Motorsports	Chevrolet	0	0	DNS	18
Official race results

== Standings after the race ==
Drivers' Championship standings

	Pos	Driver	Points
	1	Andrés Pérez de Lara	349
	2	Greg Van Alst	312 (-37)
	3	Lavar Scott	301 (–48)
4	4	Toni Breidinger	294 (–55)
2	5	Christian Rose	292 (–57)
2	6	Kris Wright	288 (–61)
1	7	Amber Balcaen	288 (–61)
3	8	Andy Jankowiak	262 (–87)
	9	Michael Maples	247 (–102)
	10	Alex Clubb	239 (–110)

- Note: Only the first 10 positions are included for the driver standings.

Previous race: 2024 Atlas 150	ARCA Menards Series; 2024 season	Next race: 2024 Berlin ARCA 200
