= Tim Monroe =

American racing driver and crew chief

- Born: February 3, 2000 (age 26); Elmwood, Illinois, U.S.

ARCA Menards Series career
- 44 races run over 7 years
- Best finish: 10th (2023)
- First race: 2020 General Tire 100 (Daytona RC)
- Last race: 2026 Audubon Park 100 (DuQuoin)
Wins	Top tens	Poles
0	8	0

ARCA Menards Series East career
- 14 races run over 4 years
- Best finish: 5th (2023)
- First race: 2022 Pensacola 200 (Pensacola)
- Last race: 2026 Cook Out 200 (Hickory)
Wins	Top tens	Poles
0	2	0

ARCA Menards Series West career
- 3 races run over 3 years
- Best finish: 68th (2022)
- First race: 2022 General Tire 150 (Phoenix)
- Last race: 2025 General Tire 150 (Phoenix)
Wins	Top tens	Poles
0	0	0
- Statistics up to date as of September 6, 2026.

Timothy "Tim" Monroe (born February 3, 2000) is an American professional stock car racing driver and crew chief. He last competed part-time in the ARCA Menards Series East, driving the No. 14 Ford for his own team, Tim Monroe Racing.

== Racing career ==
=== ARCA Menards Series ===
Monroe made his ARCA Menards Series debut in 2020 at the Daytona International Speedway Road Course. He DNF'ed due to electrical issues, finishing twentieth. He ran two other races at Lebanon I-44 Speedway, where he would finish fourteenth due to brake issues, and Illinois State Fairgrounds Racetrack, where he would finish twelfth due to transmission issues. Monroe ran two races in 2021 at Illinois State Fairgrounds and DuQuoin State Fairgrounds Racetrack, finishing eighth and sixth.

In 2022, Monroe would run in a variety of start-and-park entries for Fast Track Racing, including a one off start for Huff Racing in the No. 36 Ford at Charlotte Motor Speedway, where he would finish 23rd after running only thirteen laps due to transmission issues, finishing last at Talladega Superspeedway, Lucas Oil Indianapolis Raceway Park, and Watkins Glen International. He would go on to finish twelfth in the final points standings with a best finish of seventh at DuQuoin, which ended up being the only race he finished throughout the course of the season.

In 2023, Monroe ran all but four races in the main ARCA series and earned a best finish of eighth at DuQuoin on his way to finish tenth in the final points standings. He also ran the full ARCA Menards Series East schedule, where he finished fifth in the points standings with a best finish of seventh at Flat Rock Speedway.

In 2024, Monroe ran both dirt races at Springfield and DuQuoin while driving the No. 12 Chevrolet for Fast Track, finishing tenth in both races.

At the beginning of 2026, Monroe worked for Jan's Towing Racing as a crew chief of their No. 41 Ford in the ARCA Menards Series driven by Robbie Kennealy.

== Motorsports career results ==
=== Stock car career summary ===
Season	Series	Team	Races	Wins	Top 5	Top 10	Points	Position
2020	ARCA Menards Series	Fast Track Racing	3	0	0	0	86	39th
2021	ARCA Menards Series	Fast Track Racing	2	0	0	2	74	52nd
2022	ARCA Menards Series West	Fast Track Racing	1	0	0	0	11	68th
2022	ARCA Menards Series East	Fast Track Racing	4	0	0	0	143	15th
2022	ARCA Menards Series	Fast Track Racing	13	0	0	1	404	12th
2022	ARCA Menards Series	Huff Racing	1	0	0	0	404	12th
2023	ARCA Menards Series West	Fast Track Racing	1	0	0	0	13	74th
2023	ARCA Menards Series East	Fast Track Racing	8	0	0	2	331	5th
2023	ARCA Menards Series	Fast Track Racing	16	0	0	1	429	10th
2024	ARCA Menards Series	Fast Track Racing	3	0	0	2	96	45th
2025	ARCA Menards Series West	Fast Track Racing	1	0	0	0	21	74th
2025	ARCA Menards Series East	Fast Track Racing	1	0	0	0	30	58th
2025	ARCA Menards Series	Fast Track Racing	3	0	1	1	92	48th
2026	ARCA Menards Series East	Tim Monroe Racing	1	0	0	0	21	63rd
2026	ARCA Menards Series	Fast Track Racing	3	0	0	1	80	54th

=== ARCA Menards Series ===
ARCA Menards Series results
Year	Team	No.	Make	1	2	3	4	5	6	7	8	9	10	11	12	13	14	15	16	17	18	19	20	AMSC	Pts	Ref
2020	Fast Track Racing	11	Toyota	DAY	PHO	TAL	POC	IRP	KEN	IOW	KAN	TOL	TOL	MCH	DAY; 20	GTW								39th	86	
2020	Fast Track Racing	10	Chevy														L44; 14	TOL	BRI	WIN	MEM			39th	86	
2020	Fast Track Racing	11	Toyota																			ISF; 12	KAN	39th	86	
2021	Fast Track Racing	10	Toyota	DAY	PHO	TAL	KAN	TOL	CLT	MOH	POC	ELK	BLN	IOW	WIN	GLN	MCH	ISF; 8	MLW					52nd	74	
2021	Fast Track Racing	01	Chevy																	DSF; 6	BRI	SLM	KAN	52nd	74	
2022	Fast Track Racing	01	Chevy	DAY	PHO; 33	TAL; 33	KAN							IRP; 24										12th	404	
2022	Huff Racing	36	Ford					CLT; 23	IOW															12th	404	
2022	Fast Track Racing	12	Chevy							BLN; 14	ELK	MOH	POC						DSF; 7					12th	404	
2022	Fast Track Racing	10	Ford												MCH; 19									12th	404	
2022	Fast Track Racing	10	Chevy													GLN; 25	ISF; 19							12th	404	
2022	Fast Track Racing	10	Toyota															MLW; 26			BRI; 30			12th	404	
2022	Fast Track Racing	12	Ford																	KAN; 19				12th	404	
2022	Fast Track Racing	01	Ford																			SLM; 18	TOL; 22	12th	404	
2023	Fast Track Racing	10	Ford	DAY	PHO; 31		KAN; 26	CLT												KAN; 21		SLM; 17		10th	429	
2023	Fast Track Racing	12	Toyota			TAL; 34																		10th	429	
2023	Fast Track Racing	10	Toyota						BLN; 16	ELK	MOH; 16	IOW; 17			IRP; 22	GLN							TOL; 18	10th	429	
2023	Fast Track Racing	12	Ford										POC; 24	MCH; 21				MLW; 15						10th	429	
2023	Fast Track Racing	11	Chevy														ISF; 14							10th	429	
2023	Fast Track Racing	12	Chevy																DSF; 8					10th	429	
2023	Fast Track Racing	01	Toyota																		BRI; 25			10th	429	
2024	Fast Track Racing	12	Chevy	DAY	PHO	TAL	DOV	KAN	CLT	IOW	MOH	BLN	IRP	SLM	ELK	MCH	ISF; 10	MLW	DSF; 10	GLN	BRI	KAN		45th	96	
2024	Fast Track Racing	12	Ford																				TOL; 16	45th	96	
2025	Fast Track Racing	12	Ford	DAY	PHO; 23	TAL	KAN	CLT	MCH	BLN	ELK	LRP	DOV	IRP	IOW	GLN								48th	92	
2025	Fast Track Racing	11	Chevy														ISF; 12	MAD	DSF; 5	BRI	SLM	KAN	TOL	48th	92	
2026	Fast Track Racing	11	Ford	DAY	PHO	KAN	TAL	GLN	TOL	MCH	POC	BER	ELK	CHI; 23	LRP	IRP	IOW							54th	80	
2026	Fast Track Racing	10	Ford															ISF; 9	MAD	DSF; 20	SLM	BRI	KAN	54th	80	

==== ARCA Menards Series East ====
ARCA Menards Series East results
Year	Team	No.	Make	1	2	3	4	5	6	7	8	AMSEC	Pts	Ref
2022	Fast Track Racing	12	Chevy	NSM	FIF; 13							15th	143	
2022	Fast Track Racing	10	Toyota			DOV; 14	NSV	IOW	MLW; 26	BRI; 30		15th	143	
2023	Fast Track Racing	12	Toyota	FIF; 11								5th	331	
2023	Fast Track Racing	01	Ford		DOV; 15							5th	331	
2023	Fast Track Racing	10	Ford			NSV; 9	FRS; 7					5th	331	
2023	Fast Track Racing	10	Toyota					IOW; 17	IRP; 22			5th	331	
2023	Fast Track Racing	12	Ford							MLW; 15		5th	331	
2023	Fast Track Racing	01	Toyota								BRI; 25	5th	331	
2025	Fast Track Racing	01	Ford	FIF	CAR; 14	NSV	FRS	DOV	IRP	IOW	BRI	58th	30	
2026	Tim Monroe Racing	14	Ford	HCY; 23	CAR	NSV	TOL	IRP	FRS	IOW	BRI	63rd	21	

==== ARCA Menards Series West ====
ARCA Menards Series West results
Year	Team	No.	Make	1	2	3	4	5	6	7	8	9	10	11	12	AMSWC	Pts	Ref
2022	Fast Track Racing	01	Chevy	PHO; 33	IRW	KCR	PIR	SON	IRW	EVG	PIR	AAS	LVS	PHO		68th	11	
2023	Fast Track Racing	10	Ford	PHO; 31	IRW	KCR	PIR	SON	IRW	SHA	EVG	AAS	LVS	MAD	PHO	74th	13	
2025	Fast Track Racing	12	Ford	KER	PHO; 23	TUC	CNS	KER	SON	TRI	PIR	AAS	MAD	LVS	PHO	74th	21	
