= Tyler Reif =

American racing driver (born 2007)

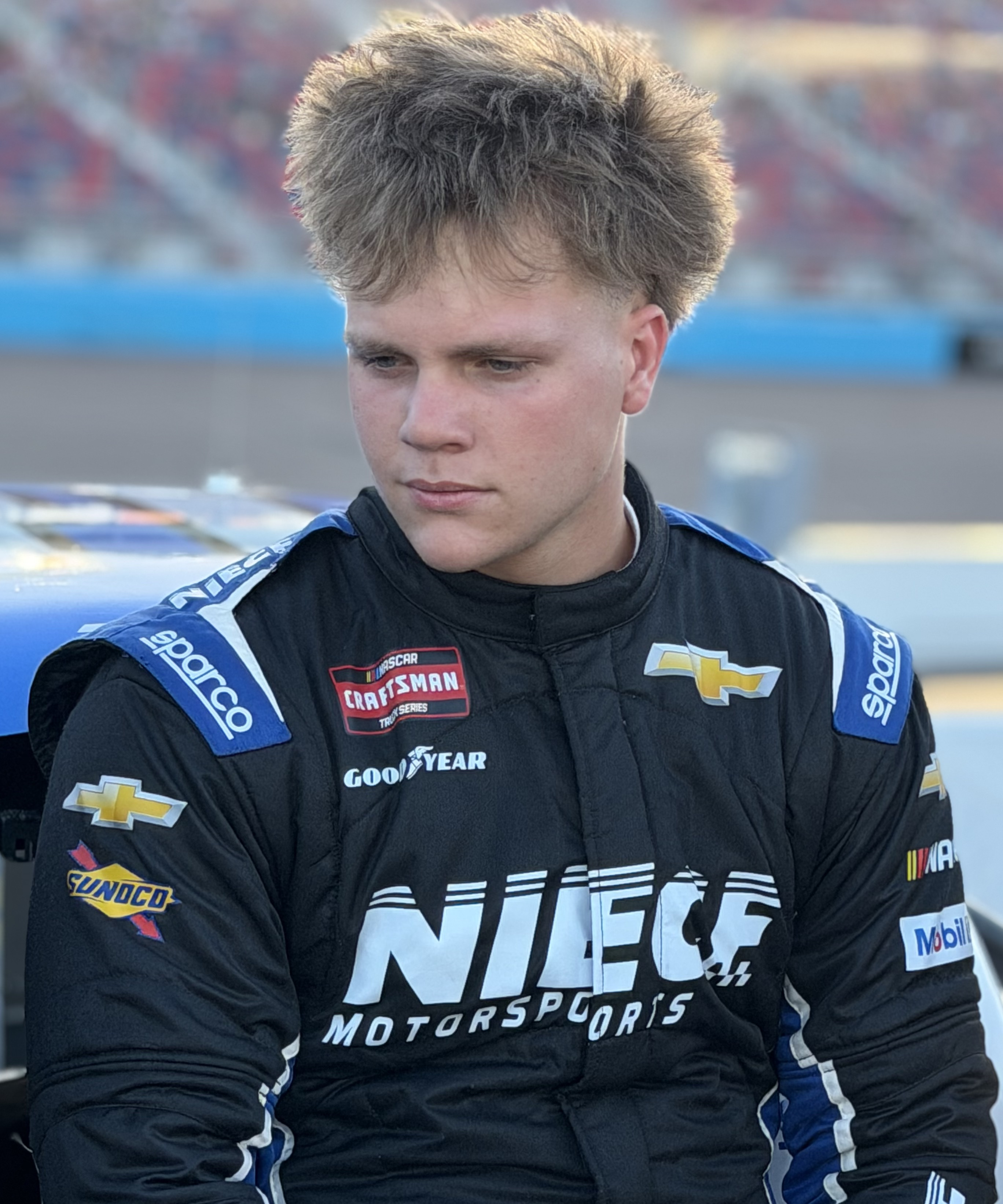
- Reif at Phoenix Raceway in 2025
- Born: June 5, 2007 (age 19); Las Vegas, Nevada, U.S.
- Achievements: 2024 MMI Legends Tour West Champion

NASCAR FedEx Freight Truck Series career
- 11 races run over 2 years
- 2026 position: 29th
- Best finish: 29th (2026)
- First race: 2025 NASCAR Craftsman Truck Series Championship Race (Phoenix)
- Last race: 2026 Craftsman 200 (Homestead)
Wins	Top tens	Poles
0	1	0

ARCA Menards Series career
- 12 races run over 3 years
- Best finish: 14th (2025)
- First race: 2023 General Tire 150 (Phoenix)
- Last race: 2025 Owens Corning 200 (Toledo)
- First win: 2023 General Tire 150 (Phoenix)
Wins	Top tens	Poles
1	7	0

ARCA Menards Series East career
- 10 races run over 3 years
- Best finish: 2nd (2025)
- First race: 2023 Pensacola 200 (Pensacola)
- Last race: 2025 Bush's Beans 200 (Bristol)
Wins	Top tens	Poles
0	7	0

ARCA Menards Series West career
- 28 races run over 4 years
- Best finish: 2nd (2023, 2024)
- First race: 2022 Star Nursery 150 (Las Vegas Bullring)
- Last race: 2025 General Tire 200 (Sonoma)
- First win: 2023 General Tire 150 (Phoenix)
- Last win: 2024 NAPA Auto Care 150 (Tri-City)
Wins	Top tens	Poles
3	18	5
- Statistics up to date as of November 6, 2026.

Tyler Reif (born June 5, 2007) is an American professional stock car racing driver. He last competed part-time in the NASCAR Craftsman Truck Series, driving the No. 42 Chevrolet Silverado RST for Niece Motorsports. He has previously competed in the ARCA Menards Series, the ARCA Menards Series East, where he finished second in the points standings in 2025, and the ARCA Menards Series West, finishing second in the point standings in 2023 and 2024.

== Racing career ==
=== Late models ===
In 2020, Reif made his debut in late models, running two races. He finished seventh and fifth in each race. That same year, Reif would also run some legends car races, winning in his first start at Meridian Speedway. In 2021, he would join the SRL Southwest Tour, driving for his family owned team, Reif Racing. He ended the season with seven top fives, nine top tens, and ranked fifth in the final standings. He returned for a full-time season in 2022, earning six top fives and nine top tens, finishing third in the standings.

=== ARCA ===
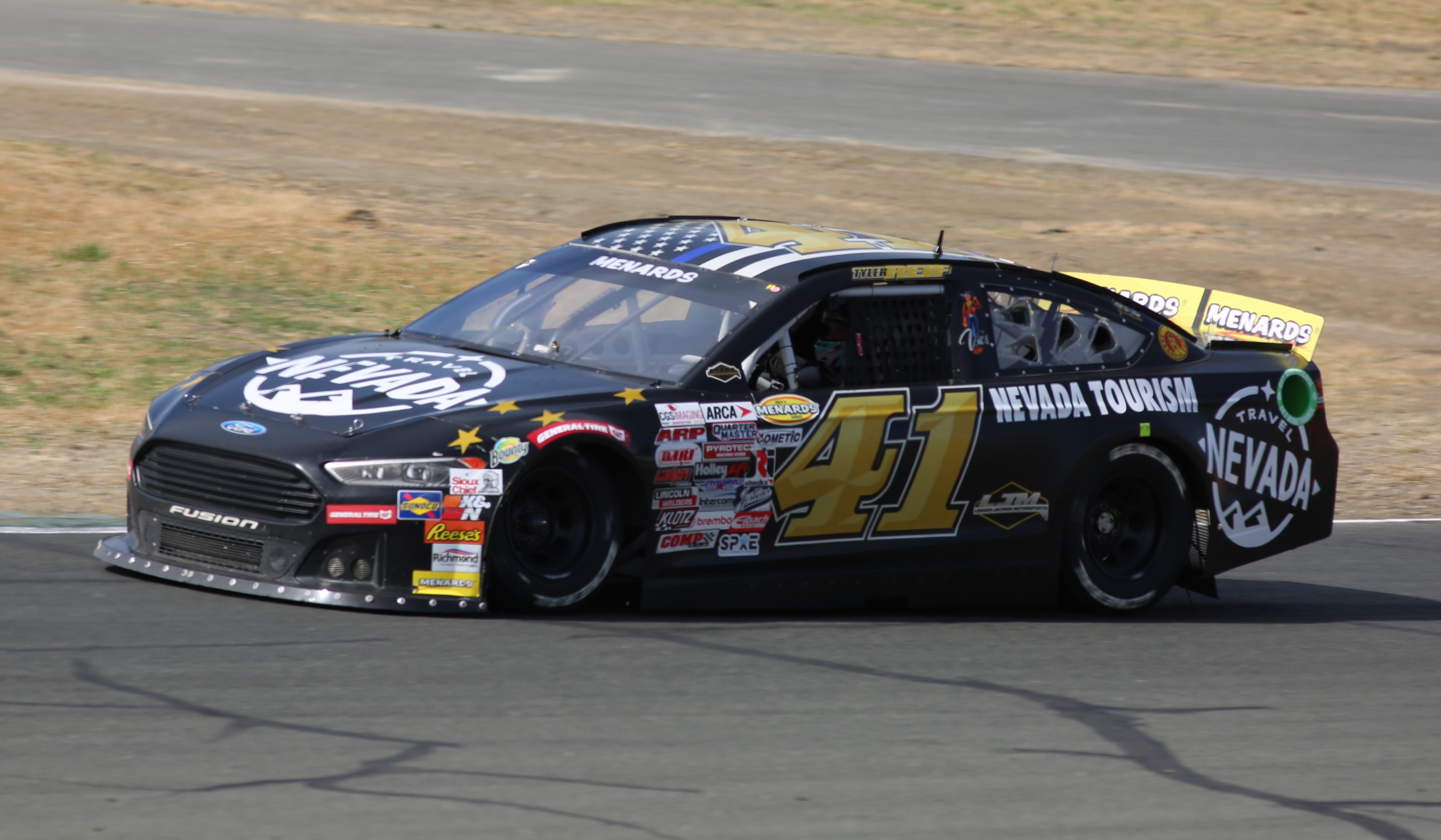
Reif's No. 41 ARCA car at Sonoma in 2023

On October 10, 2022, it was announced that Reif would make his ARCA Menards Series West debut with Lowden Motorsports at Las Vegas Motor Speedway Bullring. He would start seventh and finish eighteenth. He made his second start of the year in the season finale at Phoenix Raceway. After starting 24th, he would finish in twelfth.

On December 12, 2022, it was announced that Reif would be promoted to a full-time schedule with the newly renamed Lowden Jackson Motorsports in the 2023 season.

In the first race of the West Series season, which was the series' combination race with the main ARCA Menards Series at Phoenix Raceway, Reif scored his first career win after passing Landen Lewis for the lead on the final lap.

On February 24, 2023, it was announced that Reif would also be running full-time in the ARCA Menards Series East for the 2023 season, competing for the championships in both series with Lowden Jackson Motorsports. However, after the East Series season-opener at Five Flags Speedway, Reif was not entered in the second race of the season at Dover Motor Speedway, and therefore his full season plans fell through.

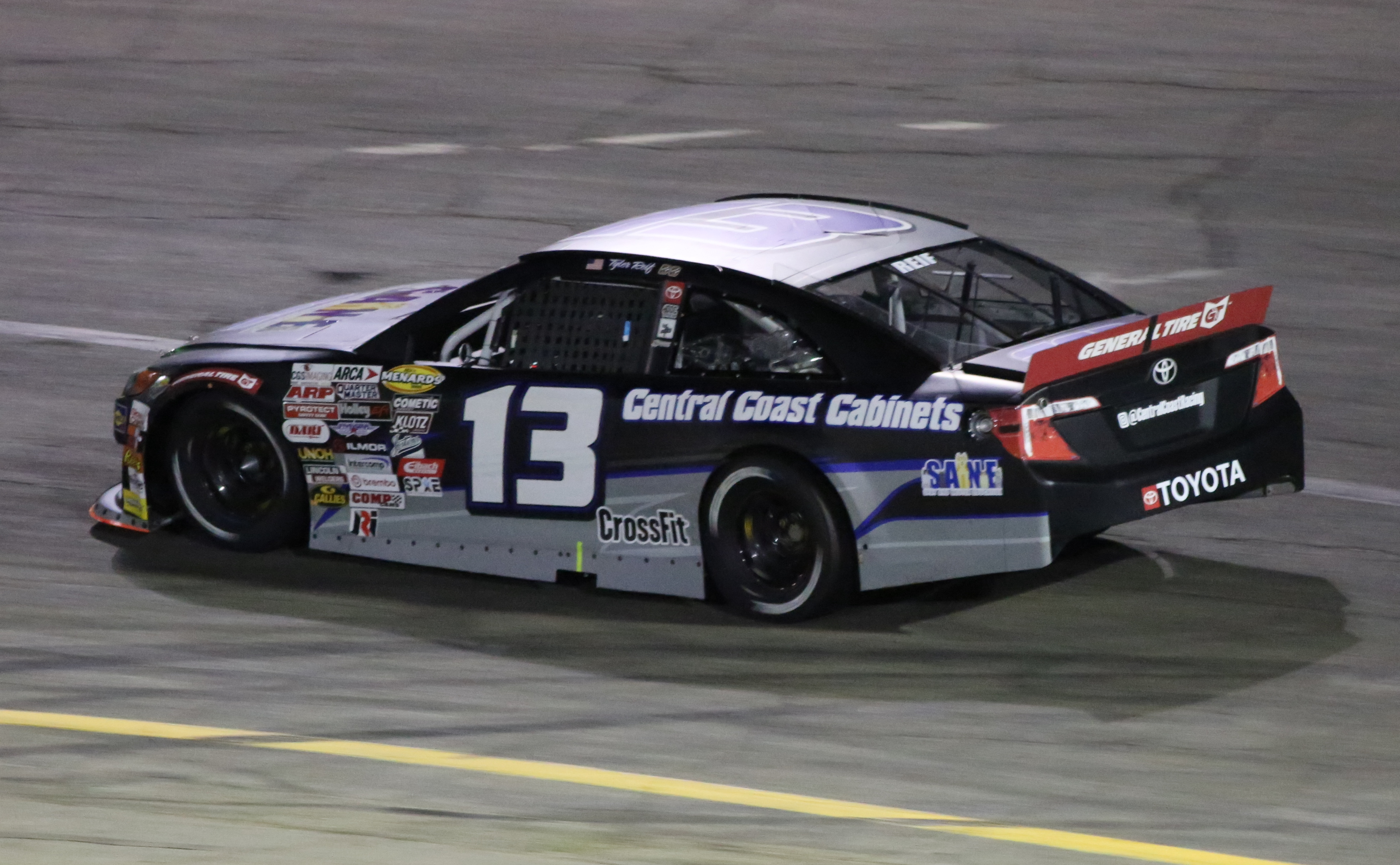
Reif's No. 13 car at All American Speedway in 2024

On July 10, 2023, it was announced that Reif would drive the No. 13 car for Central Coast Racing in the West Series race at Shasta Speedway instead of the LJM No. 41 car. Todd Souza, the owner of the team and driver of the No. 13 car, would instead drive a new second car for his team, the No. 3, in that race. On August 11, it was announced that Reif would run the final five races of the season for Central Coast Racing in their 13 car. He finished off the season second in points behind champion Sean Hingorani.

On January 3, 2024, it was announced that Reif will run full-time for CCR in the 2024 season, driving the No. 13 as the team switches from Ford to Toyota. Throughout the season, he scored wins at Shasta and Tri-City. On September 10, it was announced that Reif would run the ARCA Menards Series/East Series combination race at Bristol Motor Speedway, driving the No. 23 car for Sigma Performance Services. Reif stayed inside the top ten for the entire race and finished sixth. In the West Series, he finished eighth in the season-finale at Phoenix, and once again finished second in the point standings behind Hingorani.

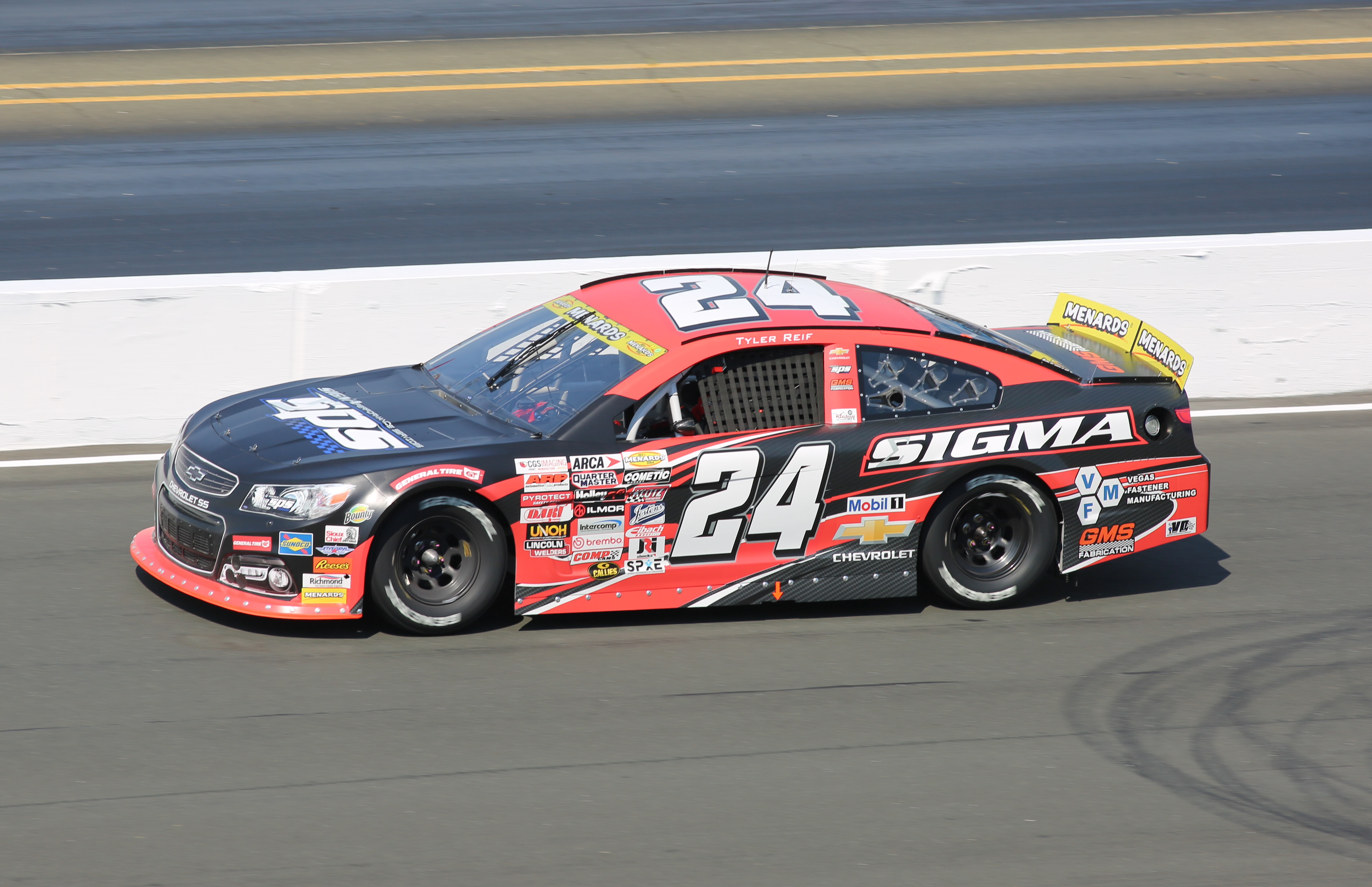
Reif's No. 24 car at Sonoma Raceway in 2025

On December 30, 2024, SPS announced that Reif would return to the team in 2025 to run full-time in the ARCA Menards Series East for the first time and part-time in the main ARCA Menards Series in their No. 23 car. He went winless during the season and finished second in the standings for the third time in his ARCA career, 17 points behind the eventual champion Isaac Kitzmiller.

=== Craftsman Truck Series ===
==== 2025 ====
On October 8, 2025, it was announced that Reif will make his debut in the NASCAR Craftsman Truck Series at Phoenix Raceway, driving the No. 41 Chevrolet for Niece Motorsports. He managed to earn a ninth-place finish in his first start.

==== 2026 ====
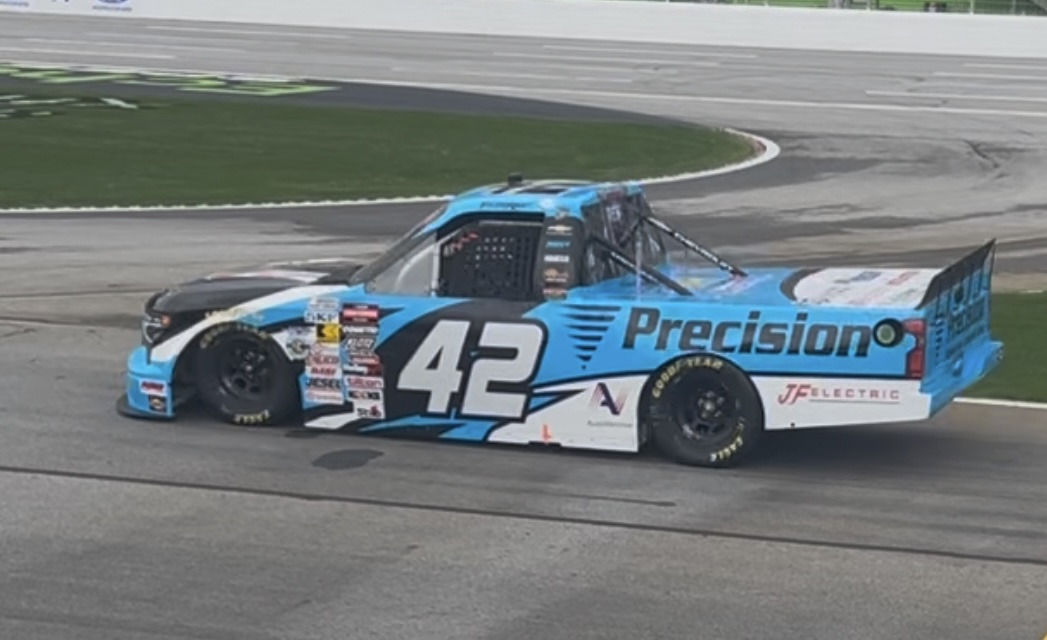
Reif's No. 42 truck at Atlanta in 2026.

On November 19, 2025, it was announced that Reif would return to Niece Motorsports for the 2026 season, driving the No. 42 Chevrolet as the anchor driver of the truck. He would make his first start at EchoPark Speedway, finishing 17th after a 27th place start. Later at Coronado Street Course, Reif was three corners away from his first NASCAR Craftsman Truck Series win, however, due to corner cutting in the chicane, this allowed Layne Riggs to pass him for the win.

== Personal life ==
Tyler's older brother, Tanner Reif, competes in the Trans-Am TA2 Series, and also previously competed in the ARCA ranks.

== Motorsports career results ==
=== Career summary ===
Season	Series	Team	Races	Wins	Top 5	Top 10	Points	Position
2022	ARCA Menards Series West	Lowden Motorsports	2	0	0	0	108	31st
2023	ARCA Menards Series	Lowden Jackson Motorsports	1	1	1	1	47	67th
2023	ARCA Menards Series East	Lowden Jackson Motorsports	1	0	0	1	38	32nd
2023	ARCA Menards Series West	Lowden Jackson Motorsports	6	1	2	4	590	2nd
2023	ARCA Menards Series West	Central Coast Racing	6	0	3	3	590	2nd
2024	ARCA Menards Series	Central Coast Racing	1	0	0	0	71	54th
2024	ARCA Menards Series	Sigma Performance Services	1	0	0	1	71	54th
2024	ARCA Menards Series East	Sigma Performance Services	1	0	0	1	38	41st
2024	ARCA Menards Series West	Sigma Performance Services	12	2	9	10	634	2nd
2025	ARCA Menards Series	Sigma Performance Services	9	0	3	5	315	14th
2025	ARCA Menards Series East	Sigma Performance Services	8	0	4	5	388	2nd
2025	ARCA Menards Series West	Sigma Performance Services	2	0	1	1	65	33rd
2025	CARS Late Model Stock Car Tour	Matt Piercy Racing	3	0	0	1	87	31st
2025	CARS Pro Late Model Tour	Bryson Lopez Racing	8	0	4	4	253	7th
2025	NASCAR Craftsman Truck Series	Niece Motorsports	1	0	0	1	28	51st
2026	NASCAR Craftsman Truck Series	Niece Motorsports						

=== NASCAR ===
(key) (Bold – Pole position awarded by qualifying time. Italics – Pole position earned by points standings or practice time. * – Most laps led.)

==== Craftsman Truck Series ====
NASCAR Craftsman Truck Series results
Year	Team	No.	Make	1	2	3	4	5	6	7	8	9	10	11	12	13	14	15	16	17	18	19	20	21	22	23	24	25	NCTC	Pts	Ref
2025	Niece Motorsports	41	Chevy	DAY	ATL	LVS	HOM	MAR	BRI	CAR	TEX	KAN	NWS	CLT	NSH	MCH	POC	LRP	IRP	GLN	RCH	DAR	BRI	NHA	ROV	TAL	MAR	PHO; 9	51st	28	
2026	Niece Motorsports	42	Chevy	DAY	ATL; 17	STP; 16	DAR	CAR	BRI; 34	TEX	GLN; 14	DOV	CLT	NSH; 36	MCH	COR; 19	LRP	NWS; 12	IRP	RCH	NHA	BRI	KAN	CLT	PHO; 27	TAL; QL^{†}	MAR; 27	HOM; 21	29th	155	
^{†} – Qualified for Conner Jones

^{*} Season still in progress
^{1} Ineligible for series points

=== ARCA Menards Series ===
(key) (Bold – Pole position awarded by qualifying time. Italics – Pole position earned by points standings or practice time. * – Most laps led. ** – All laps led.)

ARCA Menards Series results
Year	Team	No.	Make	1	2	3	4	5	6	7	8	9	10	11	12	13	14	15	16	17	18	19	20	AMSC	Pts	Ref
2023	Lowden Jackson Motorsports	41	Ford	DAY	PHO; 1	TAL	KAN	CLT	BLN	ELK	MOH	IOW	POC	MCH	IRP	GLN	ISF	MLW	DSF	KAN	BRI	SLM	TOL	67th	47	
2024	Central Coast Racing	13	Toyota	DAY	PHO; 11	TAL	DOV	KAN	CLT	IOW	MOH	BLN	IRP	SLM	ELK	MCH	ISF	MLW	DSF	GLN				54th	71	
2024	Sigma Performance Services	23	Chevy																		BRI; 6	KAN	TOL	54th	71	
2025	Sigma Performance Services	23	Chevy	DAY	PHO; 19	TAL	KAN	CLT	MCH; 7	BLN	ELK	LRP	DOV; 5	IRP; 14	IOW; 11	GLN; 2	ISF	MAD	DSF	BRI; 6	SLM	KAN; 13	TOL; 5	14th	315	

==== ARCA Menards Series East ====
ARCA Menards Series East results
Year	Team	No.	Make	1	2	3	4	5	6	7	8	AMSEC	Pts	Ref
2023	Lowden Jackson Motorsports	41	Ford	FIF; 6	DOV	NSV	FRS	IOW	IRP	MLW	BRI	32nd	38	
2024	Sigma Performance Services	23	Chevy	FIF	DOV	NSV	FRS	IOW	IRP	MLW	BRI; 6	41st	38	
2025	Sigma Performance Services	23	Chevy	FIF; 3	CAR; 17	NSH; 2	FRS; 2	DOV; 5	IRP; 14	IOW; 11	BRI; 6	2nd	388	

==== ARCA Menards Series West ====
ARCA Menards Series West results
Year	Team	No.	Make	1	2	3	4	5	6	7	8	9	10	11	12	AMSWC	Pts	Ref
2022	Lowden Motorsports	41	Ford	PHO	IRW	KCR	PIR	SON	IRW	EVG	PIR	AAS	LVS; 18	PHO; 12		31st	108	
2023	Lowden Jackson Motorsports	41	Ford	PHO; 1	IRW; 3	KCR; 6	PIR; 15	SON; 17	IRW; 6							2nd	590	
2023	Central Coast Racing	13	Ford							SHA; 14	**EVG**; 2	**AAS**; 13				2nd	590	
2023	Central Coast Racing	13	Toyota										LVS; 4	MAD; 11	PHO; 5	2nd	590	
2024	Central Coast Racing	13	Toyota	PHO; 11	**KER**; 3*			**IRW**; 5	IRW; 3	**SHA**; 1**	TRI; 1	MAD; 14	AAS; 3	KER; 4	PHO; 8	2nd	634	
2024	Central Coast Racing	13	Ford			PIR; 4	SON; 2									2nd	634	
2025	Sigma Performance Services	23	Chevy	KER	PHO; 19	TUC	CNS	KER								33rd	65	
2025	Sigma Performance Services	24	Chevy						SON; 5	TRI	PIR	AAS	MAD	LVS	PHO	33rd	65	

=== CARS Late Model Stock Car Tour ===
(key) (Bold – Pole position awarded by qualifying time. Italics – Pole position earned by points standings or practice time. * – Most laps led. ** – All laps led.)

CARS Late Model Stock Car Tour results
Year	Team	No.	Make	1	2	3	4	5	6	7	8	9	10	11	12	13	14	15	CLMSCTC	Pts	Ref
2025	Matt Piercy Racing	27	N/A	AAS	WCS	CDL	**OCS**; 6	ACE	NWS	LGY	DOM	CRW	HCY	AND					31st	87	
2025	Matt Piercy Racing	7	N/A												FLC; 21	SBO	TCM	NWS; 14	31st	87	
2026	Matt Piercy Racing	4	Chevy	SNM	WCS	NSV	CRW	ACE	LGY	DOM	NWS	HCY	AND; 21						47th	60	
2026	Matt Piercy Racing	7	Chevy											FLC; 4	TCM	NPS	SBO		47th	60	

=== CARS Pro Late Model Tour ===
(key)

CARS Pro Late Model Tour results
Year	Team	No.	Make	1	2	3	4	5	6	7	8	9	10	11	12	13	CPLMTC	Pts	Ref
2025	Bryson Lopez Racing	47	Chevy	AAS; 5	CDL; 25	OCS; 15*	ACE	NWS	CRW; 3	HCY	HCY	AND; 5	FLC; 3	SBO; 15	TCM	NWS; 16	7th	253	
