= Lavar Scott =

American racing driver (born 2003)

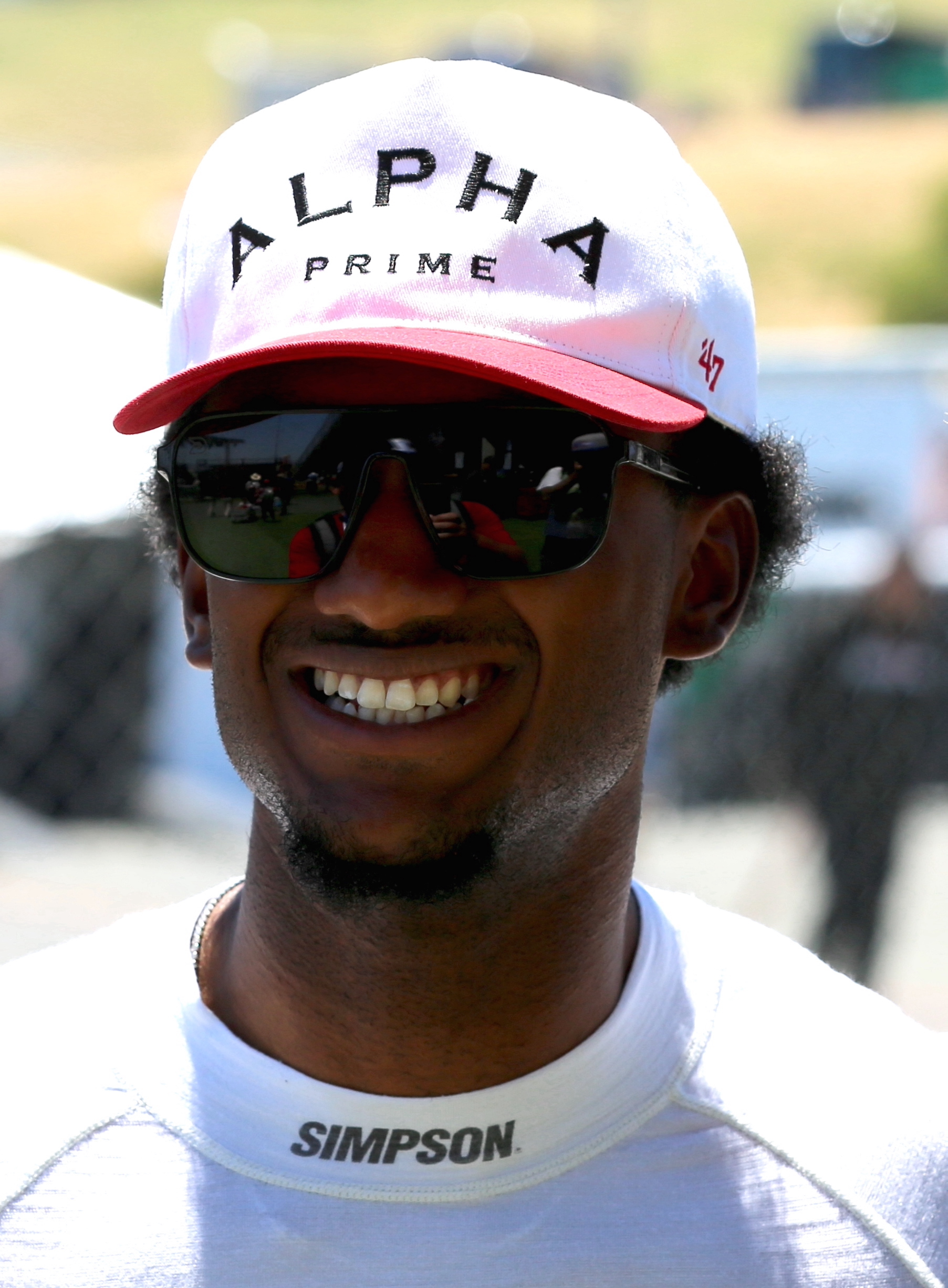
- Scott at Sonoma Raceway in 2026
- Born: Lavar Stephon Scott; September 6, 2003 (age 23); Carneys Point Township, New Jersey, U.S.
- Weight: 165 lb (75 kg)

NASCAR O'Reilly Auto Parts Series career
- 34 races run over 2 years
- 2026 position: 26th
- Best finish: 26th (2026)
- First race: 2025 BetRivers 200 (Dover)
- Last race: 2026 O'Reilly Auto Parts 300 (Homestead)
Wins	Top tens	Poles
0	0	0

ARCA Menards Series career
- 46 races run over 3 years
- Best finish: 2nd (2024, 2025)
- First race: 2023 BRANDT 200 (Daytona)
- Last race: 2025 Owens Corning 200 (Toledo)
Wins	Top tens	Poles
0	36	0

ARCA Menards Series East career
- 18 races run over 3 years
- Best finish: 3rd (2023)
- First race: 2023 Pensacola 200 (Pensacola)
- Last race: 2025 Bush's Beans 200 (Bristol)
Wins	Top tens	Poles
0	15	0

ARCA Menards Series West career
- 4 races run over 3 years
- Best finish: 30th (2024)
- First race: 2023 Desert Diamond Casino West Valley 100 (Phoenix)
- Last race: 2025 General Tire 150 (Phoenix)
Wins	Top tens	Poles
0	2	0
- Statistics up to date as of November 7, 2026.

Lavar Stephon Scott (born September 6, 2003) is an American professional stock car racing driver. He last competed full-time in the NASCAR O'Reilly Auto Parts Series, driving the No. 45 Chevrolet Camaro SS and Ford Mustang Dark Horse for Alpha Prime Racing. He has previously competed in the ARCA Menards Series. He is also a former member of NASCAR's Driver Development Program.

== Racing career ==
=== Early career ===
Scott started racing at age five in quarter midget racing cars at Airport Speedway in New Castle, Delaware (near his hometown of Carneys Point Township) alongside his older brother. After that, he would start competing in dirt racing events. At Penns Grove High School, he competed in wrestling.

In 2021 and 2022, Scott drove for Rev Racing in legends car racing and late model racing at tracks such as Hickory Motor Speedway. He won his first late model race in 2021 at Hickory. He competed in two FB Bhon Mikel's Truck Series races in Mexico in 2021 (alongside his Rev Racing/Drive for Diversity teammate Regina Sirvent) and won one of those races.

=== ARCA ===
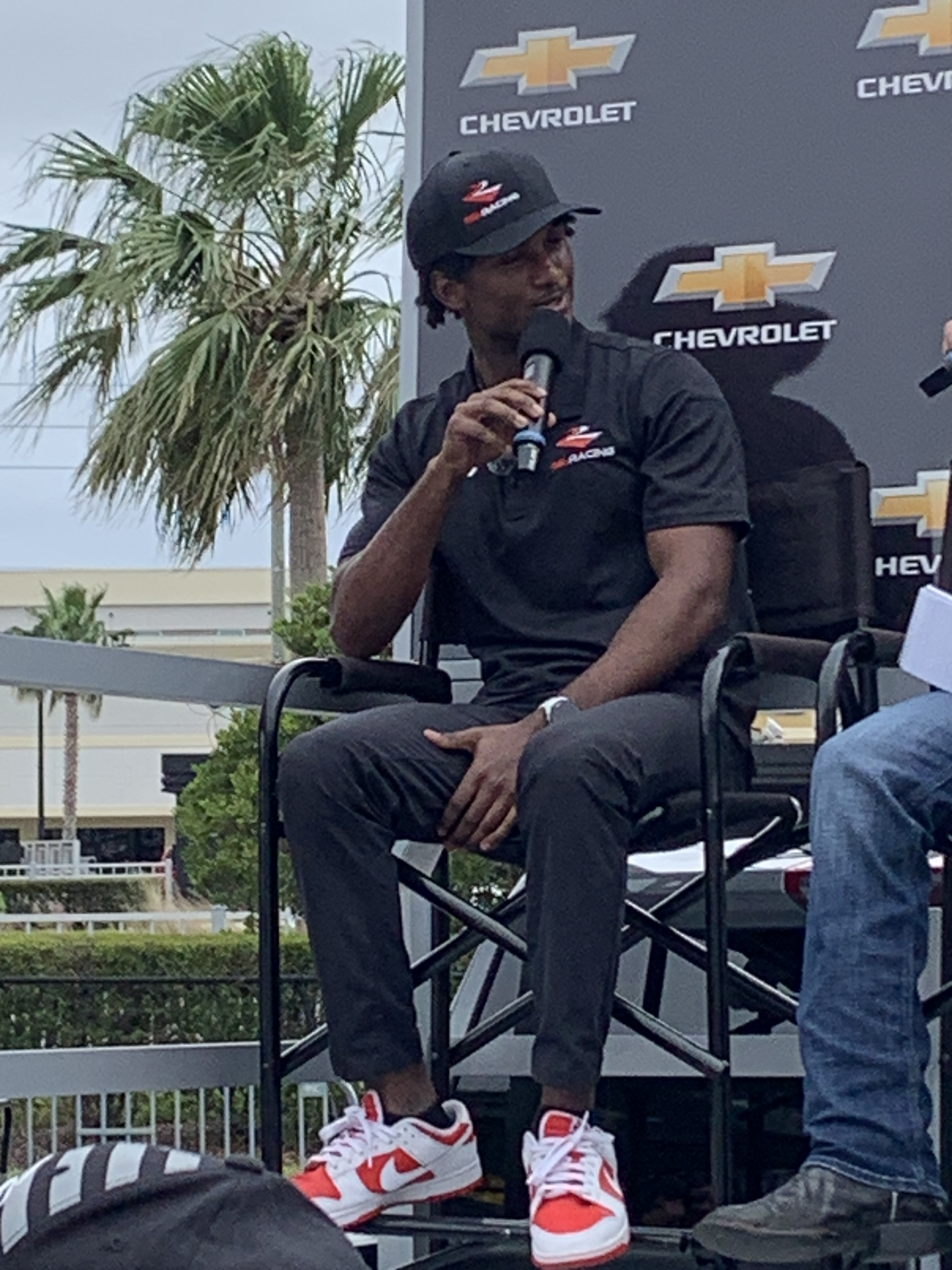
Scott appearing at the Chevrolet display at Daytona International Speedway in 2025

On January 13, 2023, it was announced that Scott would drive full-time in the ARCA Menards Series East and part-time in the main ARCA Menards Series (as a result of the East Series having four combination races with the main Series) in 2023, driving the No. 6 car for Rev Racing. He would also compete in one non-combination main ARCA race in the season-opener at Daytona, replacing Andrés Pérez de Lara in Rev's No. 2 car due to Pérez de Lara, the full-time driver of that car, still being seventeen and therefore ineligible to run the race. In December 2023, it was revealed Scott would compete full-time in the main ARCA Menards Series for Rev Racing in the No. 6 Chevrolet in 2024. During the 2024 season, Scott would have eleven top-fives and fifteen top-tens, finishing second in the points standings. Running full-time again with Rev Racing in the No. 6 Chevrolet in 2025, Scott would finish second in the points standings again with eleven top-fives and sixteen top-tens.

=== O'Reilly Auto Parts Series ===
In July 2025, it was announced that Scott would attempt to make his NASCAR Xfinity Series debut, driving in two events for Alpha Prime Racing.

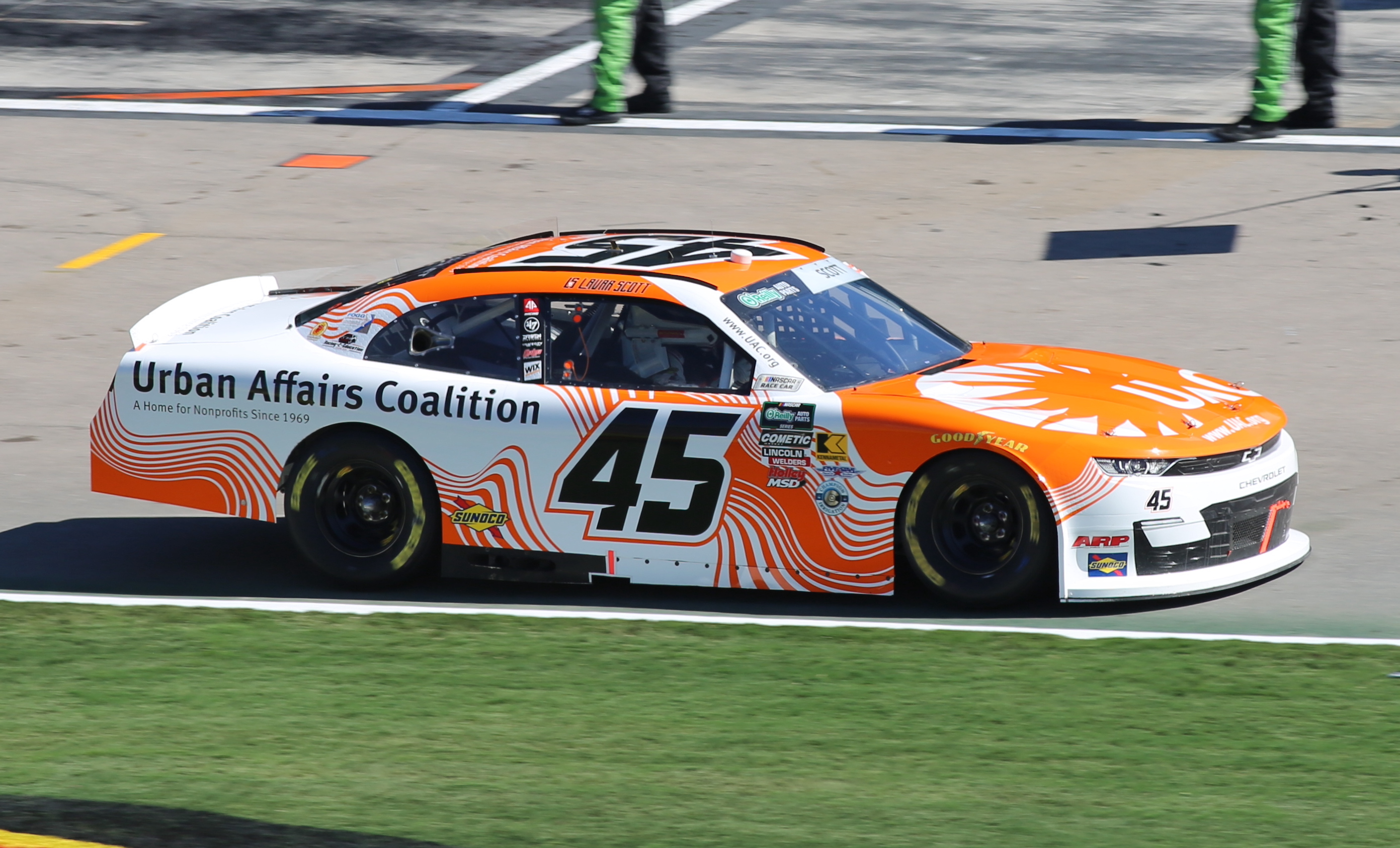
Scott's No. 45 car at Las Vegas Motor Speedway in 2026

On December 8, 2025, it was announced that Scott will drive full-time in the No. 45 for Alpha Prime Racing for the 2026 season. Scott would get eight top 20 finishes across the season with a best finish of 15th at Rockingham. Even though he missed the fall Talladega race, Scott finished 26th in points.

== Personal life ==
Scott is from Carney's Point, New Jersey. His mother was a drag racing driver and obtained a license to drive in the NHRA, and his grandfather also raced cars. His older brother raced in quarter midget racing events at nearby Airport Speedway in New Castle, Delaware at a young age. He has been inspired by fellow African-American NASCAR driver Bubba Wallace, who started his career racing on dirt tracks and for Rev Racing/in the Drive for Diversity program like Scott, and Steve Park, who competed in local short track races in the Northeastern United States early in his career like Scott. In addition, Scott is close friends with fellow NASCAR driver Rajah Caruth. The two of them, both African-Americans, were part of NASCAR's Drive for Diversity program for Rev Racing together.

Scott graduated from SCVTS in 2021 and was on the Penns Grove High School wrestling and outdoor track teams according to NJ.com.

Scott is not related to NASCAR driver Wendell Scott.

== Motorsports career results ==
=== Racing career summary ===
Season	Series	Team	Races	Wins	Top 5	Top 10	Points	Position
2023	ARCA Menards Series West	Rev Racing	1	0	0	0	27	57th
2023	ARCA Menards Series East	Rev Racing	8	0	5	7	401	**3rd**
2023	ARCA Menards Series	Rev Racing	6	0	4	5	224	20th
2024	ARCA Menards Series West	Rev Racing	2	0	0	1	66	30th
2024	ARCA Menards Series East	Rev Racing	5	0	4	5	248	8th
2024	ARCA Menards Series	Rev Racing	20	0	11	15	915	**2nd**
2025	ARCA Menards Series West	Rev Racing	1	0	1	1	39	45th
2025	ARCA Menards Series East	Rev Racing	5	0	2	3	229	9th
2025	ARCA Menards Series	Rev Racing	20	0	11	16	928	**2nd**
2025	NASCAR Xfinity Series	Alpha Prime Racing	2	0	0	0	27	54th
2026	NASCAR O'Reilly Auto Parts Series	Alpha Prime Racing					TBD	TBD

=== NASCAR ===
(key) (Bold – Pole position awarded by qualifying time. Italics – Pole position earned by points standings or practice time. * – Most laps led.)

==== O'Reilly Auto Parts Series ====
NASCAR O'Reilly Auto Parts Series results
Year	Team	No.	Make	1	2	3	4	5	6	7	8	9	10	11	12	13	14	15	16	17	18	19	20	21	22	23	24	25	26	27	28	29	30	31	32	33	NOAPSC	Pts	Ref
2025	Alpha Prime Racing	45	Chevy	DAY	ATL	COA	PHO	LVS	HOM	MAR	DAR	BRI	CAR	TAL	TEX	CLT	NSH	MXC	POC	ATL	CSC	SON	DOV; 28	IND	IOW	GLN	DAY	PIR	GTW; 19	BRI	KAN	ROV	LVS	TAL	MAR	PHO	54th	27	
2026	Alpha Prime Racing	45	Chevy	DAY; 16	ATL; 28	COA; 22	PHO; 33	LVS; 26	DAR; 36	MAR; 22	CAR; 15	BRI; 32	KAN; 18	TAL; 27	TEX; 19	GLN; 27	DOV; 36	CLT; 17	NSH; 31	POC; 29	COR; 29	SON; 32	CHI; 28	ATL; 21	IND; 27	IOW; 28	DAY; 18	DAR; 31		BRI; 36	LVS; 26		PHO; 19		MAR; 18		26th	362	
2026	Alpha Prime Racing	45	Ford																										GTW; 30			CLT; 27		TAL; DNQ		HOM; 21	26th	362	

^{*} Season still in progress
^{1} Ineligible for series points

=== ARCA Menards Series ===
(key) (Bold – Pole position awarded by qualifying time. Italics – Pole position earned by points standings or practice time. * – Most laps led.)

ARCA Menards Series results
Year	Team	No.	Make	1	2	3	4	5	6	7	8	9	10	11	12	13	14	15	16	17	18	19	20	AMSC	Pts	Ref
2023	Rev Racing	2	Chevy	DAY; 4	PHO	TAL	KAN	CLT	BLN	ELK	MOH													20th	224	
2023	Rev Racing	6	Chevy									IOW; 4	POC	MCH	IRP; 5	GLN	ISF	MLW; 8	DSF	KAN; 4	BRI; 17	SLM	TOL	20th	224	
2024	Rev Racing	6	Chevy	DAY; 15	PHO; 10	TAL; 31	DOV; 4	KAN; 13	CLT; 5	IOW; 9	MOH; 14	BLN; 2	IRP; 4	SLM; 3	ELK; 2	MCH; 15	ISF; 5	MLW; 3	DSF; 6	GLN; 9	BRI; 3	KAN; 3	TOL; 5	2nd	915	
2025	Rev Racing	6	Chevy	DAY; 4	PHO; 5	TAL; 6	KAN; 5	CLT; 3	MCH; 5	BLN; 5	ELK; 7	LRP; 7	DOV; 11	IRP; 5	IOW; 5	GLN; 10	ISF; 2	MAD; 2	DSF; 6	BRI; 11	SLM; 4	KAN; 25	TOL; 22	2nd	928	

==== ARCA Menards Series East ====
ARCA Menards Series East results
Year	Team	No.	Make	1	2	3	4	5	6	7	8	AMSEC	Pts	Ref
2023	Rev Racing	6	Chevy	FIF; 5	DOV; 5	NSV; 6	FRS; 2	IOW; 4	IRP; 5	MLW; 8	BRI; 17	3rd	401	
2024	Rev Racing	6	Chevy	FIF	DOV; 4	NSV	FRS	IOW; 9	IRP; 4	MLW; 3	BRI; 3	8th	248	
2025	Rev Racing	6	Chevy	FIF	CAR; 9	NSV	FRS	DOV; 11	IRP; 5	IOW; 5	BRI; 11	9th	229	

==== ARCA Menards Series West ====
ARCA Menards Series West results
Year	Team	No.	Make	1	2	3	4	5	6	7	8	9	10	11	12	AMSWC	Pts	Ref
2023	Rev Racing	6	Chevy	PHO	IRW	KCR	PIR	SON	IRW	SHA	EVG	AAS	LVS	MAD	PHO; 17	57th	27	
2024	Rev Racing	6	Chevy	PHO; 10	KER	PIR	SON	IRW	IRW	SHA	TRI	MAD	AAS	KER	PHO; 12	30th	66	
2025	Rev Racing	6	Chevy	KER	PHO; 5	TUC	CNS	KER	SON	TRI	PIR	AAS	MAD	LVS	PHO	45th	39	
