= 2023 Pensacola 200 =

1st race of the 2023 ARCA Menards Series East

Race details
- Race 1 of 8 of the 2023 ARCA Menards Series East
- Date: March 25, 2023
- Official name: 4th Annual Pensacola 200
- Location: Five Flags Speedway in Pensacola, Florida
- Course: Permanent racing facility
- Course length: 0.5 miles (0.80 km)
- Distance: 200 laps, 100 mi (161 km)
- Scheduled distance: 200 laps, 100 mi (161 km)
- Average speed: 82.286 mph (132.426 km/h)

Pole position
Driver	William Sawalich	Joe Gibbs Racing
- Time: 17.220

Most laps led
Driver	William Sawalich	Joe Gibbs Racing
- Laps: 200

Winner
No. 18	William Sawalich	Joe Gibbs Racing

Television in the United States
- Network: FloRacing
- Announcers: Charles Krall

Radio in the United States
- Radio: ARCA Racing Network

The 2023 Pensacola 200 was the first stock car race of the 2023 ARCA Menards Series East season, and the 4th running of the event. The race was held on Saturday, March 25, 2023, at Five Flags Speedway in Pensacola, Florida, a 0.5 mile (0.80 km) permanent asphalt oval shaped short track. The race took the scheduled 200 laps to complete. In his first career start, William Sawalich, driving for Joe Gibbs Racing, would go on to obliterate the competition, winning the pole and leading every lap of the race to earn his first career ARCA Menards Series East win. To fill out the podium, Luke Fenhaus, driving for Pinnacle Racing Group, and Jake Finch, driving for Venturini Motorsports, would finish 2nd and 3rd, respectively.

== Report ==
=== Background ===
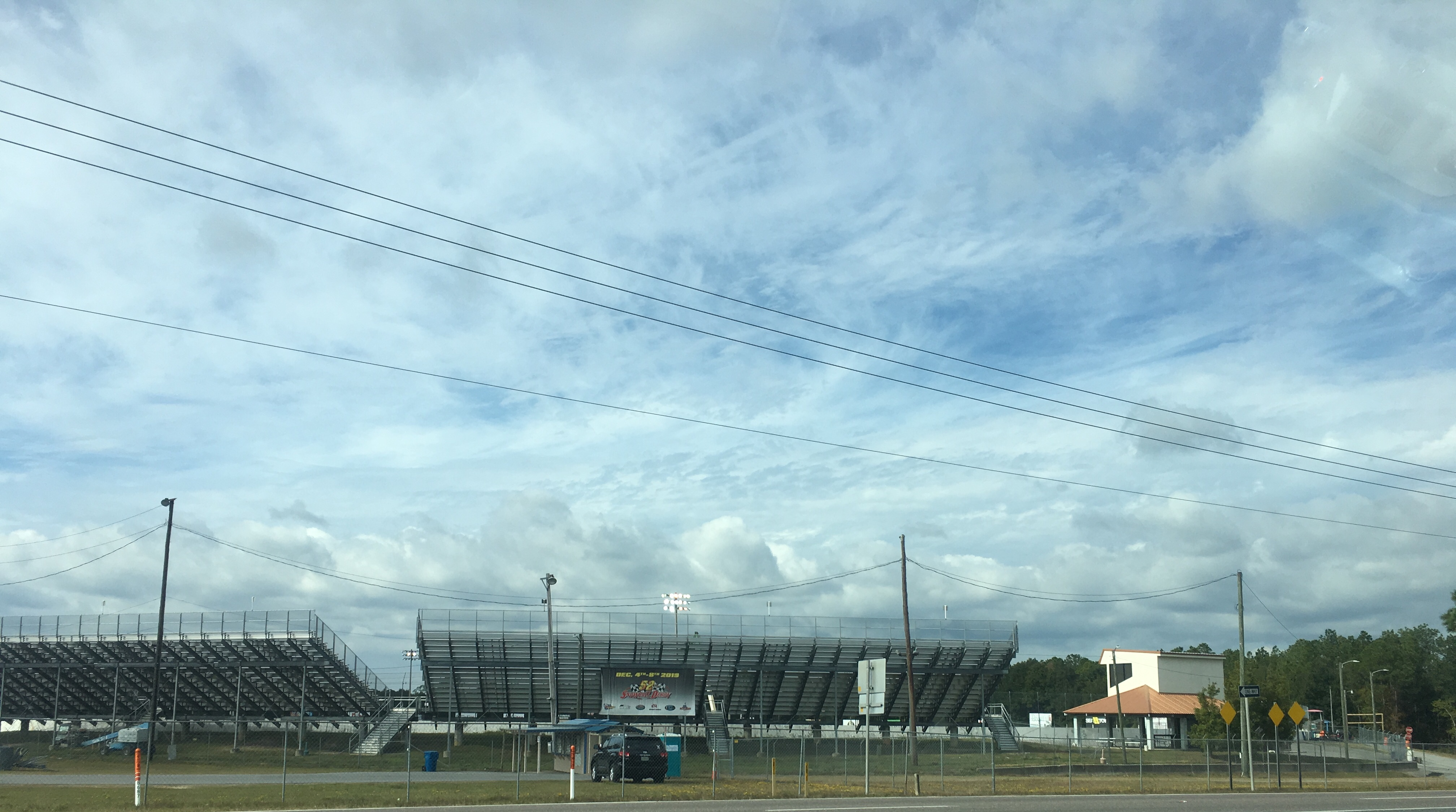
Five Flags Speedway, the circuit where the race will be held.

Five Flags Speedway is a half-mile (0.8 km) paved oval racetrack in Pensacola, Florida. It opened in 1953 and is located on Pine Forest Road. It is christened after the nickname of Pensacola—"City of Five Flags."

It runs several local classes during the regular racing season (March – October). These classes include Super Late Models, Pro Late Models, Pro Trucks, Outlaw Stocks, Sportsman, and Pure Stocks. The races are usual held on Friday nights bi-weekly. The track has also hosted many regional touring series.

In 2019, the ARCA Menards Series returned to the track, but for one year only. After the merge between ARCA and NASCAR after the 2019 season, the former NASCAR K&N Pro Series East, (now called ARCA Menards Series East) began racing at Five Flags in 2020.

==== Entry list ====
- (R) denotes rookie driver.

#	Driver	Team	Make	Sponsor
01	Dallas Frueh	Fast Track Racing	Ford	Fast Track Racing
06	Nate Moeller	Wayne Peterson Racing	Toyota	Peterson Motorsports
6	Lavar Scott (R)	Rev Racing	Chevrolet	Max Siegel Inc.
10	Ed Pompa	Fast Track Racing	Ford	HYTORC of New York / Double "H" Ranch
11	Zachary Tinkle	Fast Track Racing	Toyota	Racing for Rescues / IndianaOwned.com
12	Tim Monroe	Fast Track Racing	Toyota	Fast Track Racing
15	Sean Hingorani (R)	Venturini Motorsports	Toyota	GearWrench
18	William Sawalich (R)	Joe Gibbs Racing	Toyota	Starkey / SoundGear
20	Jake Finch	Venturini Motorsports	Toyota	Phoenix Construction
28	Luke Fenhaus (R)	Pinnacle Racing Group	Chevrolet	Chevrolet Performance
31	Rita Goulet (R)	Rise Motorsports	Chevrolet	Hitman Wear
41	Tyler Reif (R)	Lowden Jackson Motorsports	Ford	Power Gen Components / Stoney's
46	R. J. Smotherman	Lowden Jackson Motorsports	Ford	Country AF Radio / Stoney's
95	Tanner Arms	MAN Motorsports	Toyota	Sunset Park RV Manufacturing
98	Dale Shearer	Shearer Speed Racing	Toyota	Shearer Speed Racing
Official entry list

== Practice ==
The first and only practice session was held on Saturday, March 25, at 2:30 PM EST, and would last for 1 hour. William Sawalich, driving for Joe Gibbs Racing, would set the fastest time in the session, with a lap of 17.665, and a speed of 101.896 mph (163.986 km/h).

Pos.	#	Driver	Team	Make	Time	Speed
1	18	William Sawalich (R)	Joe Gibbs Racing	Toyota	17.665	101.896
2	20	Jake Finch	Venturini Motorsports	Toyota	17.715	101.609
3	28	Luke Fenhaus (R)	Pinnacle Racing Group	Chevrolet	17.830	100.953
Full practice results

== Qualifying ==
Qualifying was held on Saturday, March 25, at 4:30 PM EST. The qualifying system used is a single-car, two-lap based system. All drivers will be on track by themselves and will have two laps to post a qualifying time. The driver who sets the fastest time in qualifying will win the pole.

William Sawalich, driving for Joe Gibbs Racing, would score the pole for the race, with a lap of 17.220, and a speed of 104.530 mph (168.225 km/h).

=== Qualifying results ===
Pos.	#	Driver	Team	Make	Time	Speed
1	18	William Sawalich (R)	Joe Gibbs Racing	Toyota	17.220	104.530
2	20	Jake Finch	Venturini Motorsports	Toyota	17.484	102.951
3	28	Luke Fenhaus (R)	Pinnacle Racing Group	Chevrolet	17.536	102.646
4	41	Tyler Reif (R)	Lowden Jackson Motorsports	Ford	17.666	101.891
5	6	Lavar Scott (R)	Rev Racing	Chevrolet	17.861	100.778
6	15	Sean Hingorani (R)	Venturini Motorsports	Toyota	17.952	100.267
7	95	Tanner Arms	MAN Motorsports	Toyota	17.957	100.239
8	46	R. J. Smotherman	Lowden Jackson Motorsports	Ford	18.249	98.636
9	11	Zachary Tinkle	Fast Track Racing	Toyota	18.296	98.382
10	12	Tim Monroe	Fast Track Racing	Toyota	18.873	95.374
11	10	Ed Pompa	Fast Track Racing	Ford	19.623	91.729
12	01	Dallas Frueh	Fast Track Racing	Ford	19.685	91.440
13	31	Rita Goulet (R)	Rise Motorsports	Chevrolet	20.832	86.406
14	06	Nate Moeller	Wayne Peterson Racing	Toyota	21.463	83.865
15	98	Dale Shearer	Shearer Speed Racing	Toyota	–	–
Official qualifying results

== Race results ==
Fin	St	#	Driver	Team	Make	Laps	Led	Status	Pts
1	1	18	William Sawalich (R)	Joe Gibbs Racing	Toyota	200	200	Running	49
2	3	28	Luke Fenhaus (R)	Pinnacle Racing Group	Chevrolet	200	0	Running	42
3	2	20	Jake Finch	Venturini Motorsports	Toyota	200	0	Running	41
4	6	15	Sean Hingorani (R)	Venturini Motorsports	Toyota	200	0	Running	40
5	5	6	Lavar Scott (R)	Rev Racing	Chevrolet	199	0	Running	39
6	4	41	Tyler Reif (R)	Lowden Jackson Motorsports	Ford	198	0	Running	38
7	9	11	Zachary Tinkle	Fast Track Racing	Toyota	194	0	Running	37
8	7	95	Tanner Arms	MAN Motorsports	Toyota	193	0	Running	36
9	8	46	R. J. Smotherman	Lowden Jackson Motorsports	Ford	193	0	Running	35
10	11	10	Ed Pompa	Fast Track Racing	Ford	187	0	Running	34
11	10	12	Tim Monroe	Fast Track Racing	Toyota	37	0	Overheating	33
12	12	01	Dallas Frueh	Fast Track Racing	Ford	22	0	Overheating	32
13	14	06	Nate Moeller	Wayne Peterson Racing	Toyota	3	0	Brakes	31
14	15	98	Dale Shearer	Shearer Speed Racing	Toyota	0	0	Oil Pressure	30
15	13	31	Rita Goulet (R)	Rise Motorsports	Chevrolet	0	0	Suspension	29
Official race results

== Standings after the race ==
Drivers' Championship standings

Pos	Driver	Points
1	William Sawalich	49
2	Luke Fenhaus	42 (-7)
3	Jake Finch	41 (–8)
4	Sean Hingorani	40 (–9)
5	Lavar Scott	39 (–10)
6	Tyler Reif	38 (–11)
7	Zachary Tinkle	37 (–12)
8	Tanner Arms	36 (–13)
9	R. J. Smotherman	35 (–14)
10	Ed Pompa	34 (–15)

- Note: Only the first 10 positions are included for the driver standings.

Previous race: 2022 Bush's Beans 200	ARCA Menards Series East; 2023 season	Next race: 2023 General Tire 125
