= Luke Fenhaus =

American racing driver (born 2004)

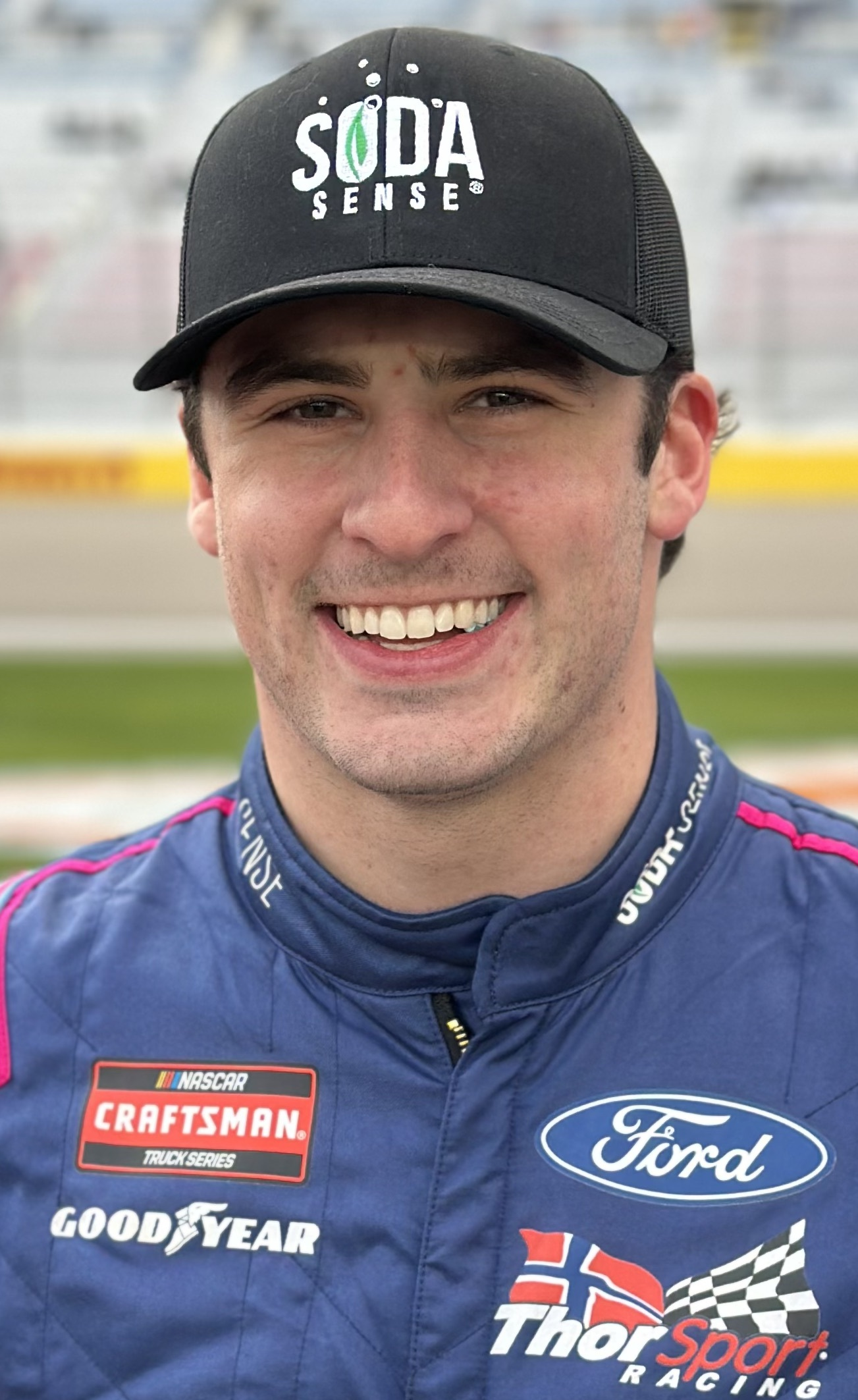
- Fenhaus at Las Vegas Motor Speedway in 2025
- Born: April 8, 2004 (age 22); Wausau, Wisconsin, U.S.
- Achievements: 2022 CARS Pro Late Model Tour Champion (Inaugural season); 2021 Alive for 5 Super Late Model Series Champion; 2021 Dells Icebreaker Winner; 2021 Slinger Nationals Winner
- Awards: 2018 Midwest Truck Series Rookie of the Year; 2022 CARS Pro Late Model Tour Rookie of the Year (Inaugural season)

NASCAR O'Reilly Auto Parts Series career
- 2 races run over 1 year
- 2026 position: 51st
- Best finish: 51st (2026)
- First race: 2026 United Rentals 300 (Daytona)
- Last race: 2026 Bennett Transportation & Logistics 250 (Atlanta)
Wins	Top tens	Poles
0	0	0

NASCAR FedEx Freight Truck Series career
- 15 races run over 2 years
- 2025 position: 27th
- Best finish: 27th (2025)
- First race: 2024 Toyota 200 (Gateway)
- Last race: 2025 Love's RV Stop 225 (Talladega)
Wins	Top tens	Poles
0	3	1

ARCA Menards Series career
- 4 races run over 1 year
- Best finish: 30th (2023)
- First race: 2023 Calypso Lemonade 150 (Iowa)
- Last race: 2023 Bush's Beans 200 (Bristol)
- First win: 2023 Calypso Lemonade 150 (Iowa)
Wins	Top tens	Poles
1	3	0

ARCA Menards Series East career
- 8 races run over 1 year
- Best finish: 2nd (2023)
- First race: 2023 Pensacola 200 (New Smyrna)
- Last race: 2023 Bush's Beans 200 (Bristol)
- First win: 2023 Music City 200 (Nashville Fairgrounds)
- Last win: 2023 Calypso Lemonade 150 (Iowa)
Wins	Top tens	Poles
2	7	0
- Statistics up to date as of November 7, 2026.

Lucas Fenhaus (born April 8, 2004) is an American professional stock car racing driver. He last competed part-time in the NASCAR O'Reilly Auto Parts Series, driving the No. 5 Ford Mustang Dark Horse for Hettinger Racing. He has previously competed in the NASCAR Craftsman Truck Series, the ARCA Menards Series, ARCA Menards Series East, and the Superstar Racing Experience, and from 2019 to 2021 was a part of the Kulwicki Driver Development program.

== Racing career ==
=== Early career ===
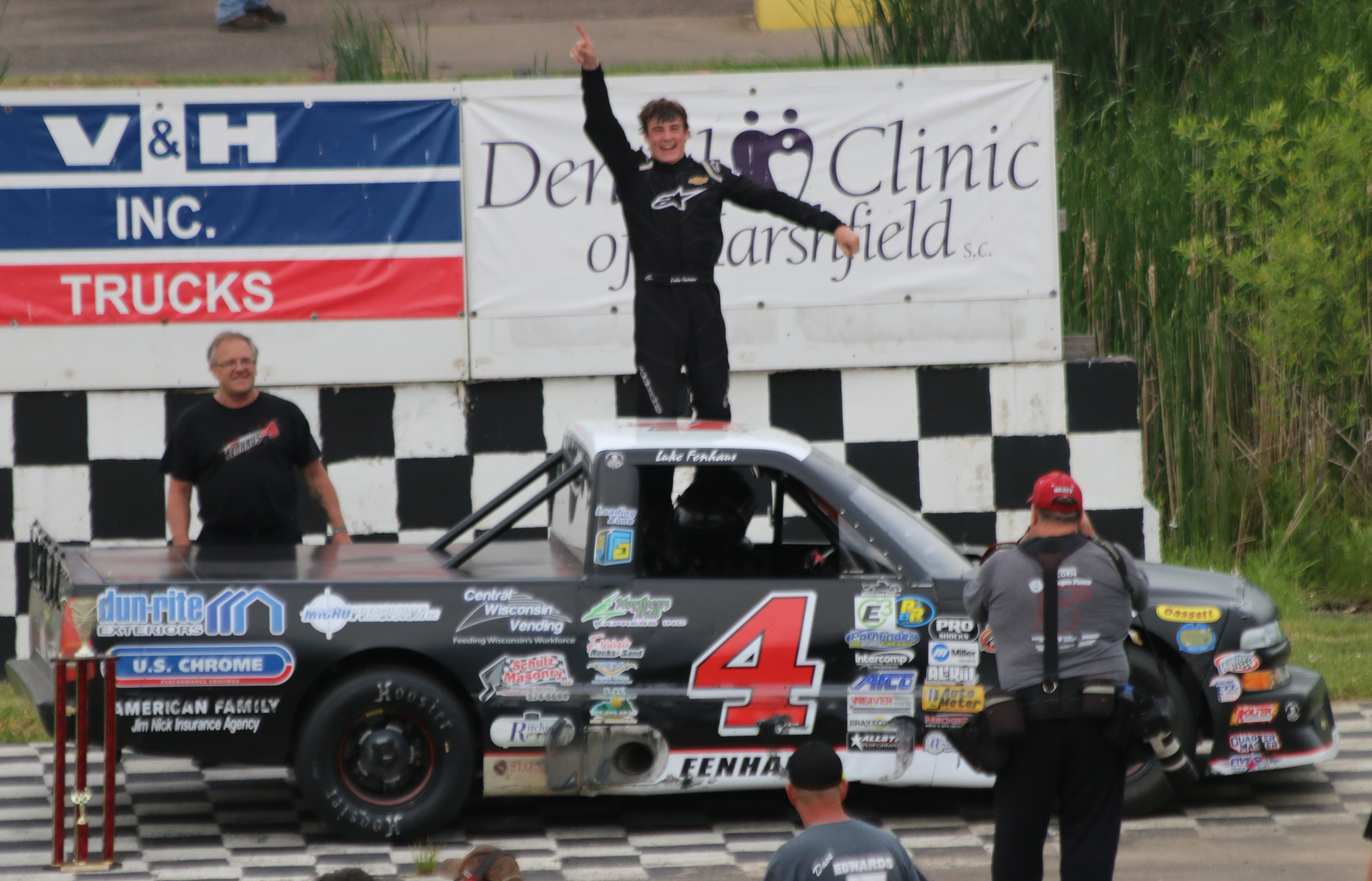
Fenhaus in 2018 after winning a race at Marshfield Motor Speedway

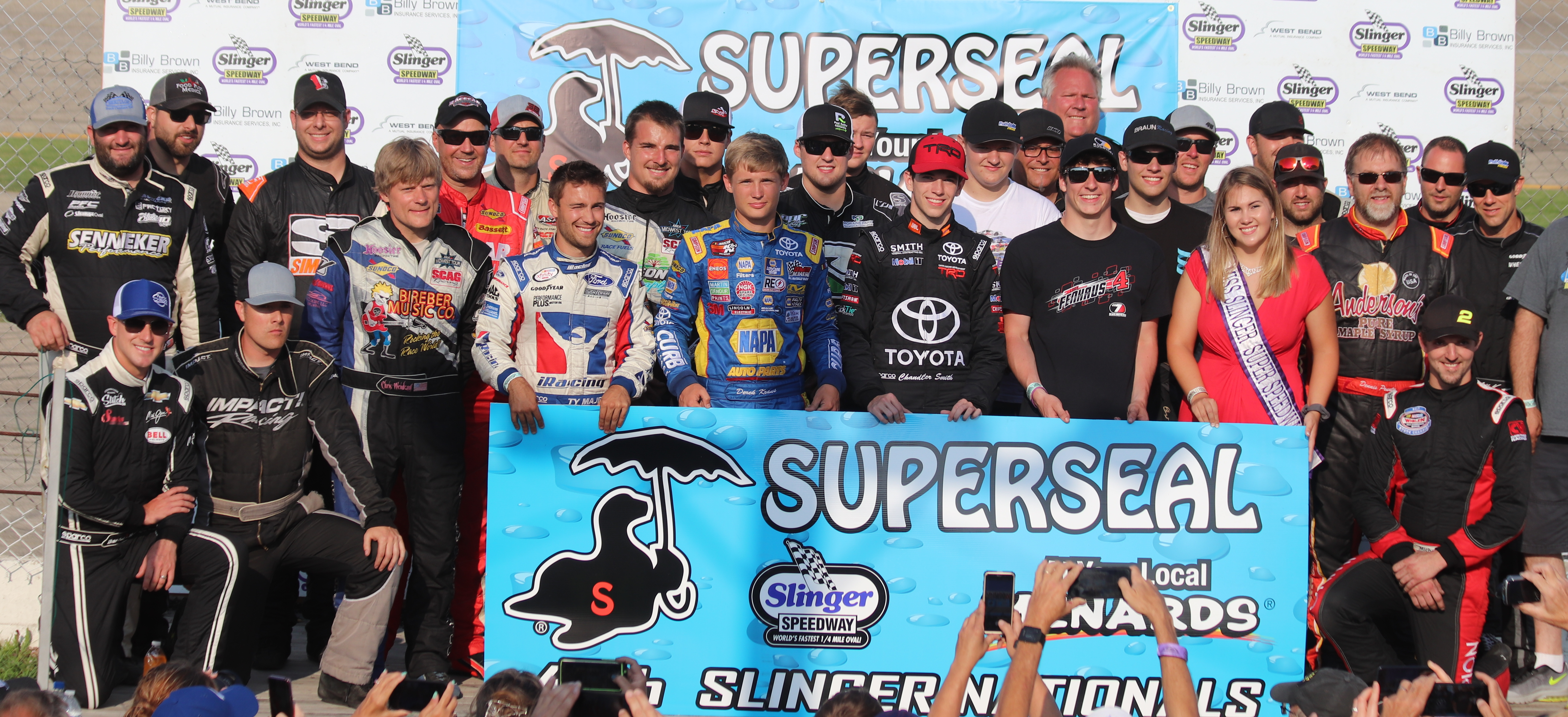
Fenhaus (second from right holding the sign) with the drivers running the 2019 Slinger Nationals

Fenhaus was inspired to race after watching his cousin, father, and grandfather race snowmobiles on ice oval tracks. He would start racing snowmobiles and then began racing on pavement in go-kart and bandolero racing. At the age of fourteen, he began competing in late model racing events at State Park Speedway in his hometown of Wausau, Wisconsin. Growing up, he watched races at the track and was inspired by Tim Sauter and his success in races there. He was part of the Alan Kulwicki driver development program and would win the Lodi Memorial and the 2018 track championship at State Park Speedway.

After winning the 2021 Slinger Nationals, Fenhaus earned a spot in the Superstar Racing Experience race at Slinger Speedway. He competed in the race against many current and former NASCAR and IndyCar drivers and finished second (behind Marco Andretti) and led the most laps.

=== CARS Tour ===
In the CARS Tour, Fenhaus drove the No. 96 Chevrolet for Highlands Motorsports in 2022 and won the championship in their Pro Late Model Tour.

=== ARCA Menards Series ===
In January 2022, Fenhaus drove a stock car for the first time as he tested an ARCA Menards Series car in the series' preseason test session at Daytona International Speedway for Fast Track Racing. He did not end up running any ARCA races for Fast Track or another team in 2022.

On March 3, 2023, it was announced that Fenhaus would run the full season in the ARCA Menards Series East for the new Pinnacle Racing Group team in their No. 28 car. After winning two races at Nashville Fairgrounds Speedway and Iowa Speedway, he finished second in the championship to William Sawalich after suffering a crash in the season finale at Bristol Motor Speedway.

=== NASCAR Craftsman Truck Series ===
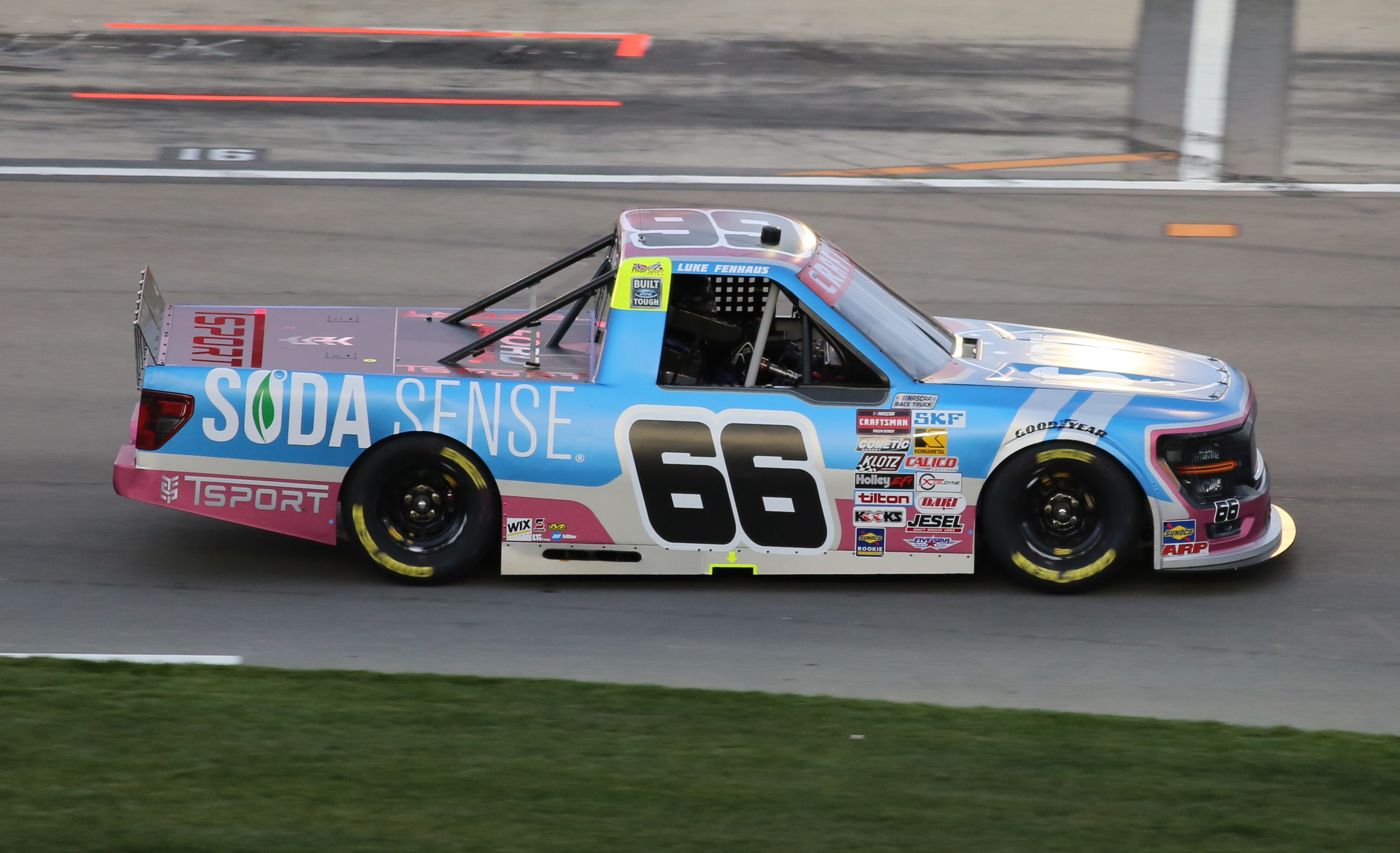
Fenhaus' No. 66 truck at Las Vegas Motor Speedway in 2025

In 2024, it was revealed that Fenhaus would make his debut in the NASCAR Craftsman Truck Series at World Wide Technology Raceway, driving the No. 66 Ford for ThorSport Racing, where he finished in tenth place. He then ran the races at Pocono Raceway and Lucas Oil Indianapolis Raceway Park, finishing twenty-second and seventh respectively.

In 2025, it was announced that Fenhaus would run another partial Truck Series schedule with ThorSport in the No. 66, this time in eleven races. At Michigan, Fenhaus would score his first career pole and would earn his best career finish of third-place.

=== NASCAR O'Reilly Auto Parts Series ===
On January 27, 2026, it was announced that Fenhaus would attempt to make his debut in the NASCAR O'Reilly Auto Parts Series at Daytona International Speedway, driving the No. 5 Ford for Hettinger Racing.

== Personal life ==
Fenhaus's cousin, father, and grandfather raced snowmobiles on ice oval tracks, and he started his racing career by racing snowmobiles before racing on pavement. He was inspired by drivers Tim Sauter (from watching him race at State Park Speedway) and Kevin Harvick (which is why he chose to race the No. 4 in late models and uses the same font that Harvick does in the Cup Series).

In 2022, Fenhaus graduated early from Wausau East High School and moved from Wisconsin to North Carolina (where NASCAR teams are located).

== Motorsports career results ==
=== Stock car career summary ===
Season	Series	Team	Races	Wins	Top 5	Top 10	Points	Position
2021	SRX Series	N/A	1	0	1	1	41	15th
2022	CARS Pro Late Model Tour	Highland Motorsports	12	0	11	12	366	**1st**
2022	CARS Late Model Stock Car Tour	Luke Fenhaus Racing	1	0	0	0	5	78th
2023	ASA STARS National Tour	Luke Fenhaus Racing	4	0	1	1	173	21st
2023	ARCA Menards Series East	Pinnacle Racing Group	8	2	6	7	412	**2nd**
2023	ARCA Menards Series	Pinnacle Racing Group	4	1	2	3	143	30th
2024	ARCA Menards Series East	Pinnacle Racing Group	0	0	0	0	0	N/A
2024	NASCAR Craftsman Truck Series	ThorSport Racing	3	0	0	2	72	37th
2025	ASA STARS National Tour	Luke Fenhaus Racing	2	0	0	0	122	28th
2025	NASCAR Craftsman Truck Series	ThorSport Racing	12	0	1	1	231	27th
2026	ASA STARS National Tour	Luke Fenhaus Racing	1	0	0	0		
2026	NASCAR O'Reilly Auto Parts Series	Hettinger Racing	2	0	0	0	31	51st

=== NASCAR ===
(key) (Bold – Pole position awarded by qualifying time. Italics – Pole position earned by points standings or practice time. * – Most laps led. ** – All laps led.)

==== O'Reilly Auto Parts Series ====
NASCAR O'Reilly Auto Parts Series results
Year	Team	No.	Make	1	2	3	4	5	6	7	8	9	10	11	12	13	14	15	16	17	18	19	20	21	22	23	24	25	26	27	28	29	30	31	32	33	NOAPSC	Pts	Ref
2026	Hettinger Racing	5	Ford	DAY; 23	ATL; 20	COA	PHO	LVS	DAR	MAR	CAR	BRI	KAN	TAL	TEX	GLN	DOV	CLT	NSH	POC	COR	SON	CHI	ATL	IND	IOW	DAY	DAR	GTW	BRI	LVS	CLT	PHO	TAL	MAR	HOM	51st	31	

==== Craftsman Truck Series ====
NASCAR Craftsman Truck Series results
Year	Team	No.	Make	1	2	3	4	5	6	7	8	9	10	11	12	13	14	15	16	17	18	19	20	21	22	23	24	25	NCTC	Pts	Ref
2024	ThorSport Racing	66	Ford	DAY	ATL	LVS	BRI	COA	MAR	TEX	KAN	DAR	NWS	CLT	GTW; 10	NSH	POC; 22	IRP; 7	RCH	MLW	BRI	KAN	TAL	HOM	MAR	PHO			37th	72	
2025	ThorSport Racing	66	Ford	DAY	ATL; 14	LVS; 23	HOM; 20	MAR	BRI; 22	CAR; 26	TEX; 27	KAN	NWS	CLT; 18	NSH; 18	**MCH**; 3	POC	LRP	IRP; 12	GLN	RCH; 22	DAR	BRI	NHA	ROV	TAL; 23	MAR	PHO	27th	231	

^{*} Season still in progress
^{1} Ineligible for series points

=== ARCA Menards Series ===
(key) (Bold – Pole position awarded by qualifying time. Italics – Pole position earned by points standings or practice time. * – Most laps led.)

ARCA Menards Series results
Year	Team	No.	Make	1	2	3	4	5	6	7	8	9	10	11	12	13	14	15	16	17	18	19	20	AMSC	Pts	Ref
2023	Pinnacle Racing Group	28	Chevy	DAY	PHO	TAL	KAN	CLT	BLN	ELK	MOH	IOW; 1	POC	MCH	IRP; 2	GLN	ISF	MLW; 6	DSF	KAN	BRI; 29	SLM	TOL	30th	143	

==== ARCA Menards Series East ====
ARCA Menards Series East results
Year	Team	No.	Make	1	2	3	4	5	6	7	8	AMSEC	Pts	Ref
2023	Pinnacle Racing Group	28	Chevy	FIF; 2	DOV; 3	NSV; 1	FRS; 5	IOW; 1	IRP; 2	MLW; 6	BRI; 29	2nd	412	
2024	Pinnacle Racing Group	28	Chevy	FIF; QL^{†}	DOV	NSV	FRS	IOW	IRP	MLW	BRI	N/A	0	
^{†} – Qualified for Connor Zilisch.

=== CARS Late Model Stock Car Tour ===
(key) (Bold – Pole position awarded by qualifying time. Italics – Pole position earned by points standings or practice time. * – Most laps led. ** – All laps led.)

CARS Late Model Stock Car Tour results
Year	Team	No.	Make	1	2	3	4	5	6	7	8	9	10	11	12	13	14	15	CLMSCTC	Pts	Ref
2022	Luke Fenhaus Racing	4F	Chevy	CRW	HCY	GPS	AAS	FCS	LGY	DOM	HCY; 28	ACE	MMS	NWS	TCM	ACE	SBO	CRW	78th	5	

=== CARS Pro Late Model Tour ===
(key)

CARS Pro Late Model Tour results
Year	Team	No.	Make	1	2	3	4	5	6	7	8	9	10	11	12	CPLMTC	Pts	Ref
2022	Highlands Motorsports	96	Chevy	**CRW**; 2*	HCY; 3	GPS; 4	**FCS**; 2*	TCM; 4	HCY; 2	ACE; 2	MMS; 4	TCM; 2	ACE; 3	SBO; 2	CRW; 6	1st	366	

=== Superstar Racing Experience ===
(key) * – Most laps led. ^{1} – Heat 1 winner. ^{2} – Heat 2 winner.

Superstar Racing Experience results
Year	No.	1	2	3	4	5	6	SRXC	Pts
2021	4	STA	KNX	ELD	IRP	SLG; 2	NSV	15th	41

=== ASA STARS National Tour ===
(key) (Bold – Pole position awarded by qualifying time. Italics – Pole position earned by points standings or practice time. * – Most laps led. ** – All laps led.)

ASA STARS National Tour results
Year	Team	No.	Make	1	2	3	4	5	6	7	8	9	10	11	12	ASNTC	Pts	Ref
2023	Luke Fenhaus Racing	4F	Chevy	FIF	MAD; 26	NWS	HCY			**WIR**; 2	TOL	WIN				21st	173	
2023	Luke Fenhaus Racing	4	Chevy					MLW; 17	AND				NSV; 18			21st	173	
2025	Luke Fenhaus Racing	4	N/A	NSM	FIF	DOM	HCY	NPS	MAD; 11	SLG; 16	AND	OWO	TOL	WIN	NSV	28th	122	
2026	Luke Fenhaus Racing	4	Ford	NSM	FIF	HCY	SLG	**MAD**; 15	NPS	OWO	TRI	WIN	NSV	NSM		-*	-*	
