= 2023 Reese's 200 =

12th race of the 2023 ARCA Menards Series

Race details
- Race 12 of 20 of the 2023 ARCA Menards Series; Race 6 of 8 of the 2023 ARCA Menards Series East
- Date: August 11, 2023
- Official name: 15th Annual Reese's 200
- Location: Lucas Oil Indianapolis Raceway Park, Brownsburg, Indiana
- Course: Permanent racing facility
- Course length: 0.686 miles (1.104 km)
- Distance: 200 laps, 137 mi (220 km)
- Scheduled distance: 200 laps, 137 mi (220 km)
- Average speed: 101.742 mph (163.738 km/h)

Pole position
Driver	Jesse Love	Venturini Motorsports
- Time: 22.363

Most laps led
Driver	Jesse Love	Venturini Motorsports
- Laps: 154

Winner
No. 20	Jesse Love	Venturini Motorsports

Television in the United States
- Network: FS1
- Announcers: Jamie Little, Phil Parsons, and Trevor Bayne

Radio in the United States
- Radio: MRN

The 2023 Reese's 200 was the 12th stock car race of the 2023 ARCA Menards Series season, the 6th race of the 2023 ARCA Menards Series East season, and the 15th iteration of the event. The race was held on Friday, August 11, 2023, in Brownsburg, Indiana at Lucas Oil Indianapolis Raceway Park, a 0.686 mile (1.104 km) permanent oval shaped racetrack. The race took the scheduled 200 laps to complete. Jesse Love, driving for Venturini Motorsports, would put on a dominating performance, leading a race-high 154 laps, and earning his ninth career ARCA Menards Series win, his first career ARCA Menards Series East win, and his seventh of the season. To fill out the podium, Luke Fenhaus, driving for Pinnacle Racing Group, and Sean Hingorani, driving for Venturini Motorsports, would finish 2nd and 3rd, respectively.

== Background ==
Lucas Oil Indianapolis Raceway Park (formerly Indianapolis Raceway Park, O'Reilly Raceway Park at Indianapolis, and Lucas Oil Raceway) is an auto racing facility in Brownsburg, Indiana, about 10 miles (16 km) northwest of downtown Indianapolis. It includes a 0.686-mile (1.104 km) oval track, a 2.5-mile (4.0 km) road course (which has fallen into disrepair and is no longer used), and a 4,400-foot (1,300 m) drag strip which is among the premier drag racing venues in the world. The complex receives about 500,000 visitors annually.

=== Entry list ===
- (R) denotes rookie driver.

#	Driver	Team	Make	Sponsor
0	Nate Moeller	Wayne Peterson Racing	Toyota	Wayne Peterson Racing
01	Brayton Laster	Fast Track Racing	Chevrolet	AutoRepairVINStickers.com
2	Andrés Pérez de Lara (R)	Rev Racing	Chevrolet	Max Siegel Inc.
03	Casey Carden	Clubb Racing Inc.	Ford	Clubb Racing Inc.
06	A. J. Moyer (R)	Wayne Peterson Racing	Toyota	River's Edge Cottages & RV Park
6	Lavar Scott (R)	Rev Racing	Chevrolet	Max Siegel Inc.
10	Tim Monroe	Fast Track Racing	Toyota	Universal Technical Institute
11	Zachary Tinkle	Fast Track Racing	Toyota	Racing for Rescues
12	D. L. Wilson	Fast Track Racing	Toyota	Ed Thompson Racing
15	Sean Hingorani (R)	Venturini Motorsports	Toyota	GearWrench
18	William Sawalich (R)	Joe Gibbs Racing	Toyota	Starkey, SoundGear
20	Jesse Love	Venturini Motorsports	Toyota	JBL
25	Conner Jones	Venturini Motorsports	Toyota	Jones Utilities
28	Luke Fenhaus (R)	Pinnacle Racing Group	Chevrolet	Chevrolet Performance
30	Frankie Muniz (R)	Rette Jones Racing	Ford	Ford Performance
31	Rita Goulet (R)	Rise Motorsports	Chevrolet	nationalpolice.org
32	Christian Rose (R)	AM Racing	Ford	West Virginia Tourism
35	Greg Van Alst	Greg Van Alst Motorsports	Ford	CB Fabricating, Vern's Concrete
48	Brad Smith	Brad Smith Motorsports	Ford	Copraya.com
55	Toni Breidinger	Venturini Motorsports	Toyota	FP Movement
66	Jon Garrett (R)	Veer Motorsports	Chevrolet	DailyDownforce.com
69	Mike Basham	Kimmel Racing	Ford	Clarksville Schwinn
93	Isaac Johnson	Costner Weaver Motorsports	Chevrolet	George E Booth Co. LLC
95	Chris Martin Jr.	MAN Motorsports	Toyota	Sunset RV Manufacturing
98	Dale Shearer	Shearer Speed Racing	Toyota	Shearer Speed Racing
Official entry list

== Practice ==
The first and only practice session was held on Friday, August 11, at 1:30 PM EST, and would last for 45 minutes. William Sawalich, driving for Joe Gibbs Racing, would set the fastest time in the session, with a lap of 22.281, and an average speed of 110.839 mph (178.378 km/h).

Pos.	#	Driver	Team	Make	Time	Speed
1	18	William Sawalich (R)	Joe Gibbs Racing	Toyota	22.281	110.839
2	25	Conner Jones	Venturini Motorsports	Toyota	22.458	109.965
3	2	Andrés Pérez de Lara (R)	Rev Racing	Chevrolet	22.544	109.546
Full practice results

== Qualifying ==
Qualifying was held on Friday, August 11, at 2:30 PM EST. The qualifying system used is a multi-car, multi-lap system with only one round. Whoever sets the fastest time in that round wins the pole. Jesse Love, driving for Venturini Motorsports, and William Sawalich, driving for Joe Gibbs Racing, would score the same time for the pole position, with both drivers getting a lap of 22.363, and an average speed of 110.432 mph (177.723 km/h). Love would be awarded with the pole due to being higher in owners points.

Pos.	#	Driver	Team	Make	Time	Speed
1	20	Jesse Love	Venturini Motorsports	Toyota	22.363	110.432
2	18	William Sawalich (R)	Joe Gibbs Racing	Toyota	22.363	110.432
3	15	Sean Hingorani (R)	Venturini Motorsports	Toyota	22.426	110.122
4	28	Luke Fenhaus (R)	Pinnacle Racing Group	Chevrolet	22.464	109.936
5	6	Lavar Scott (R)	Rev Racing	Chevrolet	22.511	109.706
6	2	Andrés Pérez de Lara (R)	Rev Racing	Chevrolet	22.522	109.653
7	25	Conner Jones	Venturini Motorsports	Toyota	22.628	109.139
8	32	Christian Rose (R)	AM Racing	Ford	22.865	108.008
9	35	Greg Van Alst	Greg Van Alst Motorsports	Ford	22.939	107.659
10	55	Toni Breidinger	Venturini Motorsports	Toyota	23.082	106.992
11	30	Frankie Muniz (R)	Rette Jones Racing	Ford	23.169	106.591
12	11	Zachary Tinkle	Fast Track Racing	Toyota	23.309	105.950
13	93	Isaac Johnson	Costner Weaver Motorsports	Chevrolet	23.575	104.755
14	66	Jon Garrett (R)	Veer Motorsports	Chevrolet	23.594	104.671
15	95	Chris Martin Jr.	MAN Motorsports	Toyota	23.892	103.365
16	06	A. J. Moyer (R)	Wayne Peterson Racing	Toyota	24.467	100.936
17	69	Mike Basham	Kimmel Racing	Ford	24.921	99.097
18	10	Tim Monroe	Fast Track Racing	Toyota	25.135	98.253
19	31	Rita Goulet (R)	Rise Motorsports	Chevrolet	25.270	97.729
20	01	Brayton Laster	Fast Track Racing	Chevrolet	25.510	96.809
21	98	Dale Shearer	Shearer Speed Racing	Toyota	25.948	95.175
22	0	Nate Moeller	Wayne Peterson Racing	Toyota	26.844	91.998
23	48	Brad Smith	Brad Smith Motorsports	Ford	32.312	76.430
24	12	D. L. Wilson	Fast Track Racing	Toyota	–	–
Withdrew
25	03	Casey Carden	Clubb Racing Inc.	Ford	–	–
Official qualifying results

== Race results ==
Fin	St	#	Driver	Team	Make	Laps	Led	Status	Pts
1	1	20	Jesse Love	Venturini Motorsports	Toyota	200	154	Running	49
2	4	28	Luke Fenhaus (R)	Pinnacle Racing Group	Chevrolet	200	24	Running	43
3	3	15	Sean Hingorani (R)	Venturini Motorsports	Toyota	200	21	Running	42
4	2	18	William Sawalich (R)	Joe Gibbs Racing	Toyota	200	1	Running	41
5	5	6	Lavar Scott (R)	Rev Racing	Chevrolet	200	0	Running	39
6	7	25	Conner Jones	Venturini Motorsports	Toyota	200	0	Running	38
7	9	35	Greg Van Alst	Greg Van Alst Motorsports	Ford	200	0	Running	37
8	6	2	Andrés Pérez de Lara (R)	Rev Racing	Chevrolet	199	0	Running	36
9	10	55	Toni Breidinger	Venturini Motorsports	Toyota	199	0	Running	35
10	8	32	Christian Rose (R)	AM Racing	Ford	197	0	Running	34
11	11	30	Frankie Muniz (R)	Rette Jones Racing	Ford	197	0	Running	33
12	13	93	Isaac Johnson	Costner Weaver Motorsports	Chevrolet	195	0	Running	32
13	12	11	Zachary Tinkle	Fast Track Racing	Toyota	193	0	Running	31
14	14	66	Jon Garrett (R)	Veer Motorsports	Chevrolet	193	0	Running	30
15	25	12	D. L. Wilson	Fast Track Racing	Toyota	190	0	Running	29
16	19	31	Rita Goulet (R)	Rise Motorsports	Chevrolet	183	0	Running	28
17	16	06	A. J. Moyer (R)	Wayne Peterson Racing	Toyota	172	0	Running	27
18	15	95	Chris Martin Jr.	MAN Motorsports	Toyota	142	0	Running	26
19	21	98	Dale Shearer	Shearer Speed Racing	Toyota	60	0	Mechanical	25
20	20	01	Brayton Laster	Fast Track Racing	Chevrolet	40	0	Oil Pressure	24
21	23	48	Brad Smith	Brad Smith Motorsports	Ford	34	0	Mechanical	23
22	18	10	Tim Monroe	Fast Track Racing	Toyota	30	0	Mechanical	22
23	22	0	Nate Moeller	Wayne Peterson Racing	Toyota	23	0	Mechanical	21
24	17	69	Mike Basham	Kimmel Racing	Ford	11	0	Mechanical	20
Withdrew
		03	Casey Carden	Clubb Racing Inc.	Ford				
Official race results

== Standings after the race ==
Drivers' Championship standings (ARCA Main)

Pos	Driver	Points
1	Jesse Love	612
2	Frankie Muniz	514 (-98)
3	Andrés Pérez de Lara	511 (-101)
4	Christian Rose	499 (-113)
5	Jon Garrett	450 (-162)
6	A. J. Moyer	398 (-214)
7	Brad Smith	379 (-233)
8	Toni Breidinger	376 (-236)
9	Tony Cosentino	276 (-336)
10	Jack Wood	255 (-357)

Drivers' Championship standings (ARCA East)

	Pos	Driver	Points
	1	William Sawalich	321
	2	Luke Fenhaus	309 (-12)
	3	Lavar Scott	288 (-33)
	4	Zachary Tinkle	274 (-47)
	5	Tim Monroe	233 (-88)
	6	Dale Shearer	228 (-93)
	7	Sean Hingorani	202 (-119)
2	8	Rita Goulet	150 (-171)
	9	Brad Smith	148 (-173)
2	10	Jake Finch	128 (-193)

- Note: Only the first 10 positions are included for the driver standings.

Previous race: 2023 Henry Ford Health 200	ARCA Menards Series; 2023 season	Next race: 2023 General Tire 100 at The Glen

Previous race: 2023 Calypso Lemonade 150	ARCA Menards Series East; 2023 season	Next race: 2023 Sprecher 150
