= 2025 DQS Solutions & Staffing 250 =

13th race of the 2025 NASCAR Craftsman Truck Series

Race details
- Race 13 of 25 of the 2025 NASCAR Craftsman Truck Series
- Date: June 7, 2025
- Location: Michigan International Speedway in Brooklyn, Michigan
- Course: Permanent racing facility
- Course length: 2.0 miles (3.2 km)
- Distance: 139 laps, 278 mi (447 km)
- Scheduled distance: 125 laps, 250 mi (402 km)
- Average speed: 112.792 mph (181.521 km/h)

Pole position
Driver	Luke Fenhaus	ThorSport Racing
- Time: 39.236

Most laps led
Driver	Carson Hocevar	Spire Motorsports
- Laps: 56

Winner
No. 52	Stewart Friesen	Halmar Friesen Racing

Television in the United States
- Network: Fox
- Announcers: Jamie Little, Regan Smith, and Michael Waltrip

Radio in the United States
- Radio: NRN

The 2025 DQS Solutions & Staffing 250 was the 13th stock car race of the 2025 NASCAR Craftsman Truck Series, and the 1st iteration of the event. The race was held on Saturday, June 7, 2025, at Michigan International Speedway in Brooklyn, Michigan, a 2.0 mile (3.2 km) permanent asphalt oval shaped intermediate racetrack. The race was contested over 139 laps, extended from 125 laps due to a triple overtime finish.

In an action-packed race with numerous late cautions, Stewart Friesen, driving for his team, Halmar Friesen Racing, held off Grant Enfinger in a triple overtime thriller to earn his fourth career NASCAR Craftsman Truck Series win, and his first of the season, breaking a 72-race winless streak dating back to the 2022 SpeedyCash.com 220. To fill out the podium, pole-sitter Luke Fenhaus, driving for ThorSport Racing, would finish in 3rd, respectively.

The race was mainly dominated by Carson Hocevar and Corey Heim, with Heim winning both stages and Hocevar leading a race-high 56 laps. Heim was involved in a restart pileup on lap 122, and fell back to finish 18th. Hocevar was given a restart violation on the second overtime attempt and dropped to the rear of the field, rebounding to finish 11th.

With a race distance of 278 miles (447 km), it was the longest Truck Series race in history, surpassing the 2019 NextEra Energy 250 by just half a mile.

== Report ==
=== Background ===
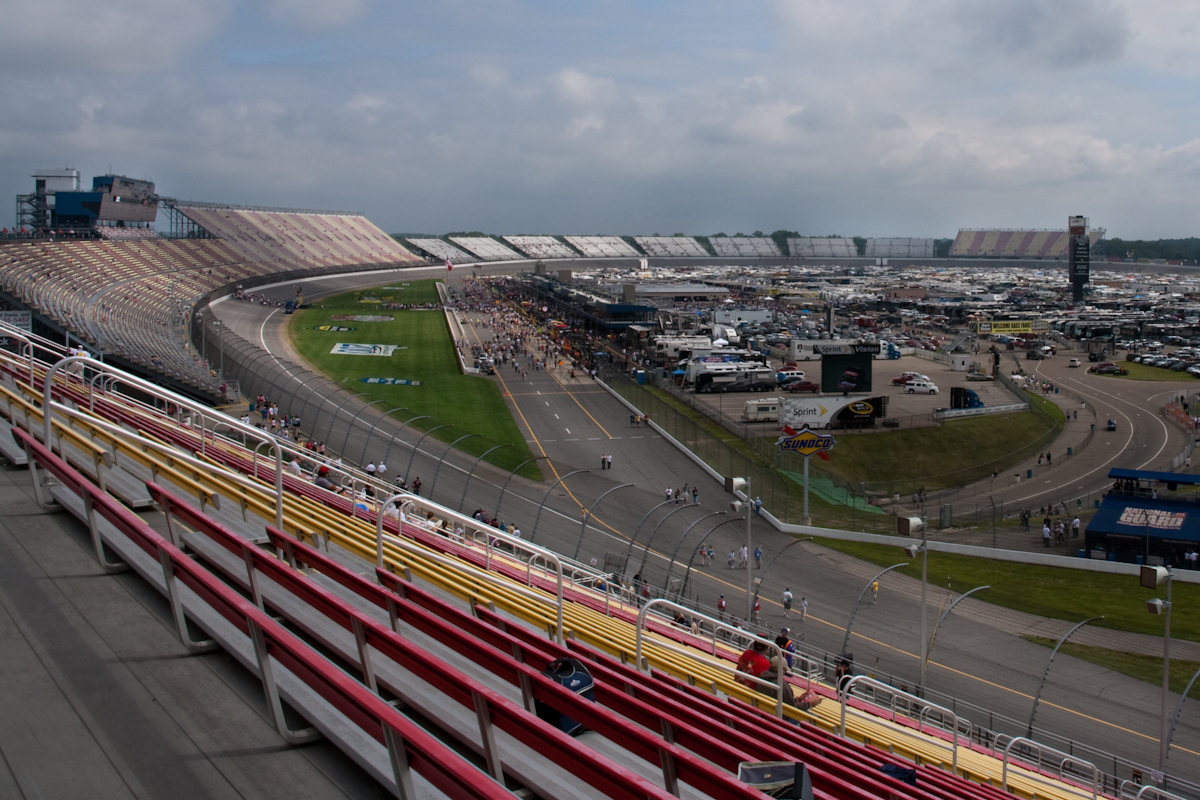
Michigan International Speedway, the track where the race was held.

Michigan International Speedway is a two-mile (3.2 km) moderate-banked D-shaped speedway located in Brooklyn, Michigan. The track is used primarily for NASCAR events. It is known as a "sister track" to Texas World Speedway as MIS's oval design was a direct basis of TWS, with moderate modifications to the banking in the corners, and was used as the basis of Auto Club Speedway. The track is owned by International Speedway Corporation. Michigan International Speedway is recognized as one of motorsports' premier facilities because of its wide racing surface and high banking (by open-wheel standards; the 18-degree banking is modest by stock car standards).

==== Entry list ====
- (R) denotes rookie driver.
- (i) denotes driver who is ineligible for series driver points.

#	Driver	Team	Make
1	Lawless Alan	Tricon Garage	Toyota
02	Nathan Byrd	Young's Motorsports	Chevrolet
2	Morgen Baird	Reaume Brothers Racing	Ford
5	Toni Breidinger (R)	Tricon Garage	Toyota
6	Norm Benning	Norm Benning Racing	Chevrolet
07	Corey LaJoie	Spire Motorsports	Chevrolet
7	Carson Hocevar (i)	Spire Motorsports	Chevrolet
9	Grant Enfinger	CR7 Motorsports	Chevrolet
11	Corey Heim	Tricon Garage	Toyota
13	Jake Garcia	ThorSport Racing	Ford
15	Tanner Gray	Tricon Garage	Toyota
17	Gio Ruggiero (R)	Tricon Garage	Toyota
18	Tyler Ankrum	McAnally-Hilgemann Racing	Chevrolet
19	Daniel Hemric	McAnally-Hilgemann Racing	Chevrolet
22	Josh Reaume	Reaume Brothers Racing	Ford
26	Dawson Sutton (R)	Rackley W.A.R.	Chevrolet
33	Frankie Muniz (R)	Reaume Brothers Racing	Ford
34	Layne Riggs	Front Row Motorsports	Ford
38	Chandler Smith	Front Row Motorsports	Ford
42	Matt Mills	Niece Motorsports	Chevrolet
44	Ross Chastain (i)	Niece Motorsports	Chevrolet
45	Kaden Honeycutt	Niece Motorsports	Chevrolet
52	Stewart Friesen	Halmar Friesen Racing	Toyota
66	Luke Fenhaus (R)	ThorSport Racing	Ford
71	Rajah Caruth	Spire Motorsports	Chevrolet
76	Spencer Boyd	Freedom Racing Enterprises	Chevrolet
77	Andrés Pérez de Lara (R)	Spire Motorsports	Chevrolet
81	Connor Mosack (R)	McAnally-Hilgemann Racing	Chevrolet
88	Matt Crafton	ThorSport Racing	Ford
91	Jack Wood	McAnally-Hilgemann Racing	Chevrolet
98	Ty Majeski	ThorSport Racing	Ford
99	Ben Rhodes	ThorSport Racing	Ford
Official entry list

== Practice ==
The first and only practice session was held on Friday, June 6, at 1:00 PM EST, and would last for 50 minutes. Tanner Gray, driving for Tricon Garage, would set the fastest time in the session, with a lap of 38.726, and a speed of 185.922 mph (299.212 km/h).

Pos.	#	Driver	Team	Make	Time	Speed
1	15	Tanner Gray	Tricon Garage	Toyota	38.726	185.922
2	66	Luke Fenhaus (R)	ThorSport Racing	Ford	38.898	185.099
3	44	Ross Chastain (i)	Niece Motorsports	Chevrolet	39.012	184.559
Full practice results

== Qualifying ==
Qualifying was held on Saturday, June 7, at 8:05 AM EST. Since Michigan International Speedway is an intermediate racetrack, the qualifying system used is a single-car, one-lap system with only one round. Drivers will be on track by themselves and will have one lap to post a qualifying time, and whoever sets the fastest time in that session will win the pole.

Road course qualifying rules were in effect. The timing line was set in Turn 3, where cars exited pit road, and drove five-eighths of a lap, then took the green flag in the north chute exiting Turn 3, and completed their lap there the next time by. Teams then immediately pitted the car, meaning only two laps were run. Indianapolis and Michigan both use restrictor plates.

Luke Fenhaus, driving for ThorSport Racing, would score the pole the race, with a lap of 39.236, and a speed of 183.505 mph (295.323 km/h). This would be his first career NCTS pole.

No drivers would fail to qualify.

=== Qualifying results ===
Pos.	#	Driver	Team	Make	Time	Speed
1	66	Luke Fenhaus (R)	ThorSport Racing	Ford	39.236	183.505
2	7	Carson Hocevar (i)	Spire Motorsports	Chevrolet	39.286	183.271
3	88	Matt Crafton	ThorSport Racing	Ford	39.321	183.108
4	13	Jake Garcia	ThorSport Racing	Ford	39.336	183.038
5	91	Jack Wood	McAnally-Hilgemann Racing	Chevrolet	39.369	182.885
6	98	Ty Majeski	ThorSport Racing	Ford	39.415	182.672
7	11	Corey Heim	Tricon Garage	Toyota	39.442	182.547
8	81	Connor Mosack (R)	McAnally-Hilgemann Racing	Chevrolet	39.458	182.473
9	99	Ben Rhodes	ThorSport Racing	Ford	39.473	182.403
10	18	Tyler Ankrum	McAnally-Hilgemann Racing	Chevrolet	39.510	182.232
11	19	Daniel Hemric	McAnally-Hilgemann Racing	Chevrolet	39.511	182.228
12	77	Andrés Pérez de Lara (R)	Spire Motorsports	Chevrolet	39.557	182.016
13	71	Rajah Caruth	Spire Motorsports	Chevrolet	39.622	181.717
14	9	Grant Enfinger	CR7 Motorsports	Chevrolet	39.632	181.671
15	26	Dawson Sutton (R)	Rackley W.A.R.	Chevrolet	39.654	181.571
16	45	Kaden Honeycutt	Niece Motorsports	Chevrolet	39.675	181.474
17	52	Stewart Friesen	Halmar Friesen Racing	Toyota	39.723	181.255
18	34	Layne Riggs	Front Row Motorsports	Ford	39.728	181.232
19	1	Lawless Alan	Tricon Garage	Toyota	39.736	181.196
20	17	Gio Ruggiero (R)	Tricon Garage	Toyota	39.766	181.059
21	22	Josh Reaume	Reaume Brothers Racing	Ford	39.847	180.691
22	42	Matt Mills	Niece Motorsports	Chevrolet	39.852	180.668
23	15	Tanner Gray	Tricon Garage	Toyota	39.887	180.510
24	07	Corey LaJoie	Spire Motorsports	Chevrolet	39.980	180.090
25	33	Frankie Muniz (R)	Reaume Brothers Racing	Ford	40.054	179.757
26	44	Ross Chastain (i)	Niece Motorsports	Chevrolet	40.056	179.748
27	5	Toni Breidinger (R)	Tricon Garage	Toyota	40.407	178.187
28	02	Nathan Byrd	Young's Motorsports	Chevrolet	40.473	177.896
29	76	Spencer Boyd	Freedom Racing Enterprises	Chevrolet	41.079	175.272
30	6	Norm Benning	Norm Benning Racing	Chevrolet	43.169	166.786
31	38	Chandler Smith	Front Row Motorsports	Ford	–	–
Qualified by owner's points
32	2	Morgen Baird	Reaume Brothers Racing	Ford	–	–
Official qualifying results
Official starting lineup

== Race results ==
Stage 1 Laps: 30

Pos.	#	Driver	Team	Make	Pts
1	11	Corey Heim	Tricon Garage	Toyota	10
2	7	Carson Hocevar (i)	Spire Motorsports	Chevrolet	0
3	81	Connor Mosack (R)	McAnally-Hilgemann Racing	Chevrolet	8
4	98	Ty Majeski	ThorSport Racing	Ford	7
5	45	Kaden Honeycutt	Niece Motorsports	Chevrolet	6
6	18	Tyler Ankrum	McAnally-Hilgeman Racing	Chevrolet	5
7	66	Luke Fenhaus (R)	ThorSport Racing	Ford	4
8	44	Ross Chastain (i)	Niece Motorsports	Chevrolet	0
9	34	Layne Riggs	Front Row Motorsports	Ford	2
10	77	Andrés Pérez de Lara (R)	Spire Motorsports	Chevrolet	1

Stage 2 Laps: 30

Pos.	#	Driver	Team	Make	Pts
1	11	Corey Heim	Tricon Garage	Toyota	10
2	7	Carson Hocevar (i)	Spire Motorsports	Chevrolet	0
3	98	Ty Majeski	ThorSport Racing	Ford	8
4	45	Kaden Honeycutt	Niece Motorsports	Chevrolet	7
5	81	Connor Mosack (R)	McAnally-Hilgemann Racing	Chevrolet	6
6	44	Ross Chastain (i)	Niece Motorsports	Chevrolet	0
7	17	Gio Ruggiero (R)	Tricon Garage	Toyota	4
8	15	Tanner Gray	Tricon Garage	Toyota	3
9	38	Chandler Smith	Front Row Motorsports	Ford	2
10	66	Luke Fenhaus (R)	ThorSport Racing	Ford	1

Stage 3 Laps: 79

Fin	St	#	Driver	Team	Make	Laps	Led	Status	Pts
1	17	52	Stewart Friesen	Halmar Friesen Racing	Toyota	139	2	Running	40
2	14	9	Grant Enfinger	CR7 Motorsports	Chevrolet	139	31	Running	35
3	1	66	Luke Fenhaus (R)	ThorSport Racing	Ford	139	1	Running	39
4	9	99	Ben Rhodes	ThorSport Racing	Ford	139	0	Running	33
5	24	07	Corey LaJoie	Spire Motorsports	Chevrolet	139	12	Running	32
6	3	88	Matt Crafton	ThorSport Racing	Ford	139	0	Running	31
7	4	13	Jake Garcia	ThorSport Racing	Ford	139	0	Running	30
8	31	38	Chandler Smith	Front Row Motorsports	Ford	139	0	Running	31
9	12	77	Andrés Pérez de Lara (R)	Spire Motorsports	Chevrolet	139	0	Running	29
10	18	34	Layne Riggs	Front Row Motorsports	Ford	139	0	Running	29
11	2	7	Carson Hocevar (i)	Spire Motorsports	Chevrolet	139	56	Running	0
12	20	17	Gio Ruggiero (R)	Tricon Garage	Toyota	139	2	Running	29
13	15	26	Dawson Sutton (R)	Rackley W.A.R.	Chevrolet	139	0	Running	24
14	25	33	Frankie Muniz (R)	Reaume Brothers Racing	Ford	139	0	Running	23
15	6	98	Ty Majeski	ThorSport Racing	Ford	139	0	Running	37
16	29	76	Spencer Boyd	Freedom Racing Enterprises	Chevrolet	139	0	Running	21
17	23	15	Tanner Gray	Tricon Garage	Toyota	139	1	Running	23
18	7	11	Corey Heim	Tricon Garage	Toyota	139	29	Running	39
19	8	81	Connor Mosack (R)	McAnally-Hilgemann Racing	Chevrolet	138	1	Running	32
20	5	91	Jack Wood	McAnally-Hilgemann Racing	Chevrolet	136	0	Running	17
21	16	45	Kaden Honeycutt	Niece Motorsports	Chevrolet	136	2	Running	30
22	27	5	Toni Breidinger (R)	Tricon Garage	Toyota	134	0	Accident	15
23	22	42	Matt Mills	Niece Motorsports	Chevrolet	132	0	Accident	14
24	10	18	Tyler Ankrum	McAnally-Hilgemann Racing	Chevrolet	130	0	Running	18
25	21	22	Josh Reaume	Reaume Brothers Racing	Ford	129	0	Running	12
26	26	44	Ross Chastain (i)	Niece Motorsports	Chevrolet	128	2	DVP	0
27	11	19	Daniel Hemric	McAnally-Hilgemann Racing	Chevrolet	126	0	Accident	10
28	19	1	Lawless Alan	Tricon Garage	Toyota	126	0	Accident	9
29	32	2	Morgen Baird	Reaume Brothers Racing	Ford	83	0	Accident	8
30	28	02	Nathan Byrd	Young's Motorsports	Chevrolet	83	0	Accident	7
31	13	71	Rajah Caruth	Spire Motorsports	Chevrolet	77	0	Accident	6
32	30	6	Norm Benning	Norm Benning Racing	Chevrolet	3	0	Engine	5
Official race results

== Standings after the race ==
Drivers' Championship standings

	Pos	Driver	Points
	1	Corey Heim	605
1	2	Chandler Smith	472 (–133)
1	3	Daniel Hemric	454 (–151)
1	4	Grant Enfinger	441 (–164)
1	5	Tyler Ankrum	424 (–181)
	6	Layne Riggs	424 (–181)
	7	Kaden Honeycutt	408 (–197)
1	8	Ty Majeski	393 (–212)
1	9	Jake Garcia	389 (–216)
2	10	Stewart Friesen	347 (–258)
Official driver's standings

Manufacturers' Championship standings

Pos	Manufacturer	Points
1	Chevrolet	482
2	Toyota	462 (-20)
3	Ford	445 (–37)

- Note: Only the first 10 positions are included for the driver standings.

Previous race: 2025 Rackley Roofing 200	NASCAR Craftsman Truck Series; 2025 season	Next race: 2025 MillerTech Battery 200
