= 2023 Music City 200 =

Race details
- Race 3 of 8 of the 2023 ARCA Menards Series East
- Date: May 13, 2023
- Official name: 3rd Annual Music City 200
- Location: Nashville Fairgrounds Speedway in Nashville, Tennessee
- Course: Permanent racing facility
- Course length: 0.596 miles (0.959 km)
- Distance: 205 laps, 122 mi (196 km)
- Scheduled distance: 200 laps, 119 mi (192 km)
- Average speed: 110.512 mph (177.852 km/h)

Pole position
Driver	William Sawalich	Joe Gibbs Racing
- Time: 19.415

Most laps led
Driver	William Sawalich	Joe Gibbs Racing
- Laps: 202

Winner
No. 28	Luke Fenhaus	Pinnacle Racing Group

Television in the United States
- Network: FloRacing; CNBC (Tape Delayed)
- Announcers: Charles Krall

Radio in the United States
- Radio: ARCA Racing Network

The 2023 Music City 200 was the 3rd stock car race of the 2023 ARCA Menards Series East season, and the 3rd iteration of the event. The race was held on Saturday, May 13, 2023, at the Nashville Fairgrounds Speedway in Nashville, Tennessee, a 0.596 mile (0.959 km) permanent asphalt oval shaped short track. The race was originally scheduled to be contested over 200 laps, but was increased to 205 laps, due to a NASCAR overtime finish. In an action packed finish, Luke Fenhaus, driving for Pinnacle Racing Group, would steal the win from the dominating William Sawalich, taking the lead on the final restart and leading the final lap to earn his first career ARCA Menards Series East win. Sawalich had dominated the entire race, leading all but three laps, but eventually lost the lead on the final restart, finishing 2nd. To fill out the podium, Sean Hingorani, driving for Venturini Motorsports, would finish in 3rd, respectively.

== Report ==
=== Background ===
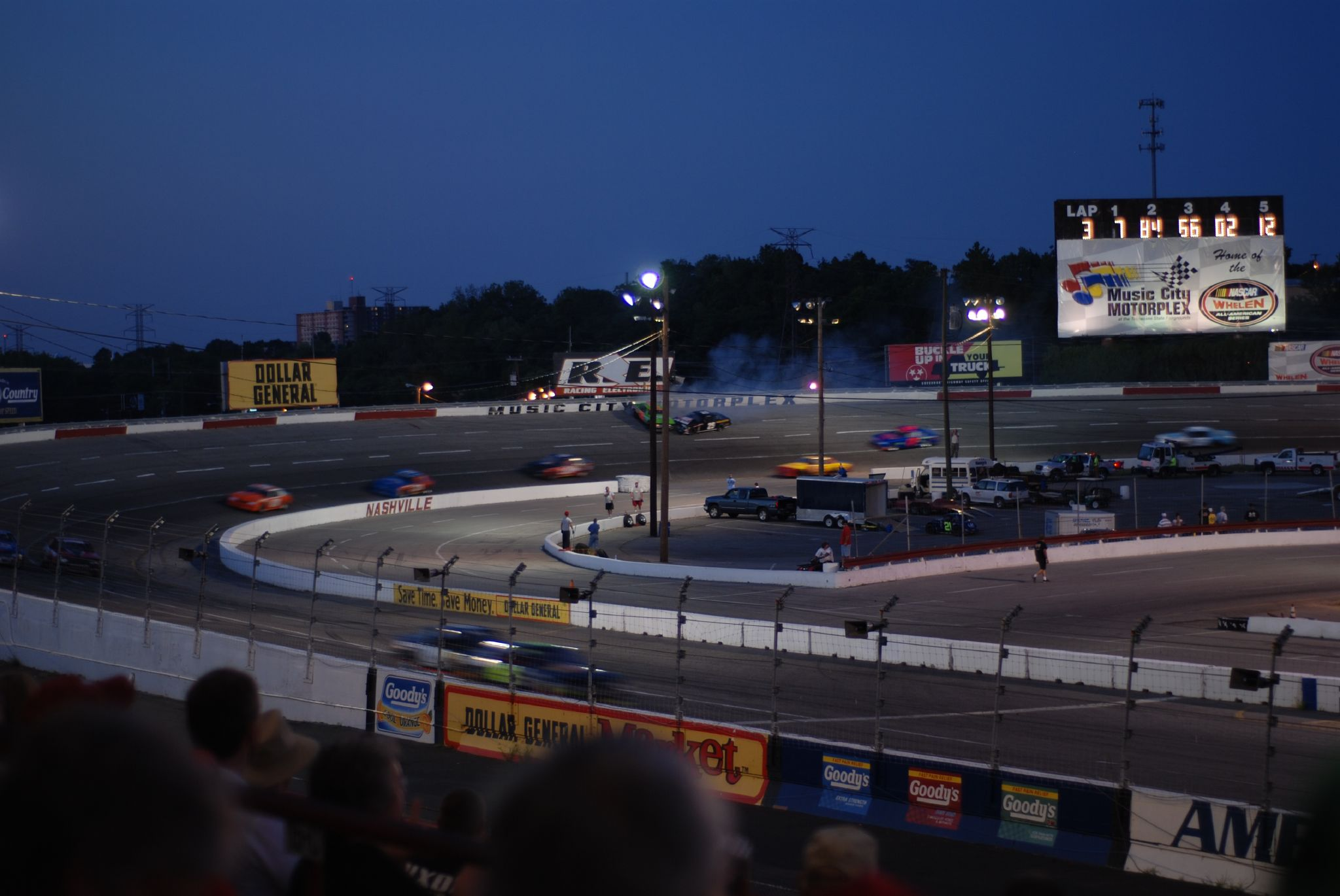
Nashville Fairgrounds Speedway, the circuit where the race was held.

Nashville Fairgrounds Speedway is a motorsport racetrack located at the Nashville Fairgrounds near downtown Nashville, Tennessee. The track is the second-oldest continually operating track in the United States. The track held NASCAR Grand National/Winston Cup (now NASCAR Cup Series) races from 1958 to 1984.

The speedway is currently an 18 degree banked paved oval. The track is 0.596 mi (0.959 km) long. Inside the larger oval is a 1/4 mi (0.40 km) paved oval.

The track was converted to a 1/2 mi (0.80 km) paved oval in 1957, when it began to be a NASCAR series track. The speedway was lengthened between the 1969 and 1970 seasons. The corners were cut down from 35 degrees to their present 18 degrees in 1972. The track was repaved between the 1995 and 1996 seasons.

==== Entry list ====
- (R) denotes rookie driver.

#	Driver	Team	Make	Sponsor
01	Brayton Laster	Fast Track Racing	Toyota	Running's Racing Designs
1	Jake Finch	Phoenix Racing	Toyota	Phoenix Construction
06	Nate Moeller	Wayne Peterson Racing	Toyota	Wayne Peterson Racing
6	Lavar Scott (R)	Rev Racing	Chevrolet	Max Siegel Inc.
10	Tim Monroe	Fast Track Racing	Ford	Universal Technical Institute
11	Zachary Tinkle	Fast Track Racing	Toyota	NASCAR Foundation NASCAR Day Giveathon
12	Stephanie Moyer	Fast Track Racing	Chevrolet	Mark Rumbold Farms / UTI
15	Sean Hingorani (R)	Venturini Motorsports	Toyota	GearWrench
18	William Sawalich (R)	Joe Gibbs Racing	Toyota	Starkey / SoundGear
20	Gio Ruggiero	Venturini Motorsports	Toyota	Yahoo! / Mobil 1
28	Luke Fenhaus (R)	Pinnacle Racing Group	Chevrolet	Chevrolet Performance
31	Rita Goulet (R)	Rise Motorsports	Chevrolet	Rise Motorsports
48	Brad Smith	Brad Smith Motorsports	Chevrolet	Insta-Lub Fast Lube Centers
95	Tanner Arms	MAN Motorsports	Toyota	Sunset Park RV Manufacturing
98	Dale Shearer	Shearer Speed Racing	Toyota	Shearer Speed Racing
Official entry list

== Practice ==
The first and only practice session was held on Saturday, May 13, at 2:00 PM CST, and would last for 60 minutes. William Sawalich, driving for Joe Gibbs Racing, would set the fastest time in the session, with a lap of 19.683, and a speed of 109.008 mph (175.431 km/h).

Pos.	#	Driver	Team	Make	Time	Speed
1	18	William Sawalich (R)	Joe Gibbs Racing	Toyota	19.683	109.008
2	20	Gio Ruggiero	Venturini Motorsports	Toyota	19.808	108.320
3	28	Luke Fenhaus (R)	Pinnacle Racing Group	Chevrolet	19.895	107.846
Full practice results

== Qualifying ==
Qualifying was held on Saturday, May 13, at 4:00 PM CST. The qualifying system used is a single-car, two-lap based system. All drivers will be on track by themselves and will have two laps to post a qualifying time. The driver who sets the fastest time in qualifying will win the pole.

William Sawalich, driving for Joe Gibbs Racing, would score the pole for the race, with a lap of 19.415, and a speed of 110.512 mph (177.852 km/h).

=== Qualifying results ===
Pos.	#	Driver	Team	Make	Time	Speed
1	18	William Sawalich (R)	Joe Gibbs Racing	Toyota	19.415	110.512
2	20	Gio Ruggiero	Venturini Motorsports	Toyota	19.454	110.291
3	15	Sean Hingorani (R)	Venturini Motorsports	Toyota	19.589	109.531
4	28	Luke Fenhaus (R)	Pinnacle Racing Group	Chevrolet	19.682	109.013
5	6	Lavar Scott (R)	Rev Racing	Chevrolet	19.745	108.665
6	95	Tanner Arms	MAN Motorsports	Toyota	19.898	107.830
7	11	Zachary Tinkle	Fast Track Racing	Toyota	20.006	107.248
8	10	Tim Monroe	Fast Track Racing	Ford	21.516	99.721
9	12	Stephanie Moyer	Fast Track Racing	Chevrolet	22.276	96.319
10	01	Brayton Laster	Fast Track Racing	Toyota	22.487	95.415
11	31	Rita Goulet (R)	Rise Motorsports	Chevrolet	22.552	95.140
12	98	Dale Shearer	Shearer Speed Racing	Toyota	23.209	92.447
13	48	Brad Smith	Brad Smith Motorsports	Chevrolet	25.065	85.601
14	1	Jake Finch	Phoenix Racing	Toyota	–	–
15	06	Nate Moeller	Wayne Peterson Racing	Toyota	–	–
Official qualifying results

== Race results ==
Fin	St	#	Driver	Team	Make	Laps	Led	Status	Pts
1	4	28	Luke Fenhaus (R)	Pinnacle Racing Group	Chevrolet	205	2	Running	47
2	1	18	William Sawalich (R)	Joe Gibbs Racing	Toyota	205	202	Running	45
3	3	15	Sean Hingorani (R)	Venturini Motorsports	Toyota	205	1	Running	42
4	2	20	Gio Ruggiero	Venturini Motorsports	Toyota	205	0	Running	40
5	14	1	Jake Finch	Phoenix Racing	Toyota	205	0	Running	39
6	5	6	Lavar Scott (R)	Rev Racing	Chevrolet	205	0	Running	38
7	7	11	Zachary Tinkle	Fast Track Racing	Toyota	203	0	Running	37
8	6	95	Tanner Arms	MAN Motorsports	Toyota	196	0	Running	36
9	8	10	Tim Monroe	Fast Track Racing	Ford	192	0	Running	35
10	12	98	Dale Shearer	Shearer Speed Racing	Toyota	176	0	Running	34
11	11	31	Rita Goulet (R)	Rise Motorsports	Chevrolet	146	0	Accident	33
12	13	48	Brad Smith	Brad Smith Motorsports	Chevrolet	87	0	Mechanical	32
13	9	12	Stephanie Moyer	Fast Track Racing	Chevrolet	20	0	Mechanical	31
14	10	01	Brayton Laster	Fast Track Racing	Toyota	18	0	Fuel Pressure	30
15	15	06	Nate Moeller	Wayne Peterson Racing	Toyota	10	0	Brakes	29
Official race results

== Standings after the race ==
Drivers' Championship standings

	Pos	Driver	Points
	1	William Sawalich	135
1	2	Luke Fenhaus	130 (-5)
1	3	Jake Finch	128 (–7)
2	4	Sean Hingorani	116 (–19)
1	5	Lavar Scott	116 (–19)
1	6	Zachary Tinkle	112 (–23)
1	7	Tim Monroe	97 (–38)
2	8	Dale Shearer	94 (–41)
	9	Rita Goulet	94 (–41)
4	10	Tanner Arms	72 (–63)

- Note: Only the first 10 positions are included for the driver standings.

Previous race: 2023 General Tire 125	ARCA Menards Series East; 2024 season	Next race: 2023 Dutch Boy 150
