= 2025 eero 250 =

18th race of the 2025 NASCAR Craftsman Truck Series

Race details
- Race 18 of 25 of the 2025 NASCAR Craftsman Truck Series
- Date: August 15, 2025
- Official name: 6th Annual eero 250
- Location: Richmond Raceway in Richmond, Virginia
- Course: Permanent racing facility
- Course length: 0.750 miles (1.207 km)
- Distance: 250 laps, 187 mi (301 km)
- Scheduled distance: 250 laps, 187 mi (301 km)
- Average speed: 84.459 mph (135.924 km/h)

Pole position
Driver	Corey Heim	Tricon Garage
- Time: 23.095

Most laps led
Driver	Ty Majeski	ThorSport Racing
- Laps: 143

Winner
No. 11	Corey Heim	Tricon Garage

Television in the United States
- Network: FS1
- Announcers: Jamie Little, Regan Smith, and Michael Waltrip

Radio in the United States
- Radio: NRN

The 2025 eero 250 was the 18th stock car race of the 2025 NASCAR Craftsman Truck Series, the final race of the regular season, and the 6th iteration of the event. The race was held on Friday, August 15, 2025, at Richmond Raceway in Richmond, Virginia, a 0.750 miles (1.207 km) permanent quad-oval shaped racetrack. The race took the scheduled 250 laps to complete.

Pole-sitter Corey Heim, driving for Tricon Garage, was able to take advantage of late-race troubles with Ty Majeski, the most dominant driver of the event. Heim led the final 19 laps to earn his 18th career NASCAR Craftsman Truck Series win, and his seventh of the season. Majeski led a race-high 143 laps and swept both stages, until getting spun by his teammate Matt Crafton with under 50 laps to go. Majeski came back to finish second, and was unable to track down Heim in the end. To fill out the podium, Layne Riggs, driving for Front Row Motorsports, would finish in 3rd, respectively.

The 2025 playoff field was set; the 10 drivers that qualified were Corey Heim, Layne Riggs, Chandler Smith, Daniel Hemric, Tyler Ankrum, Ty Majeski, Grant Enfinger, Rajah Caruth, Kaden Honeycutt, and Jake Garcia.

== Report ==
=== Background ===
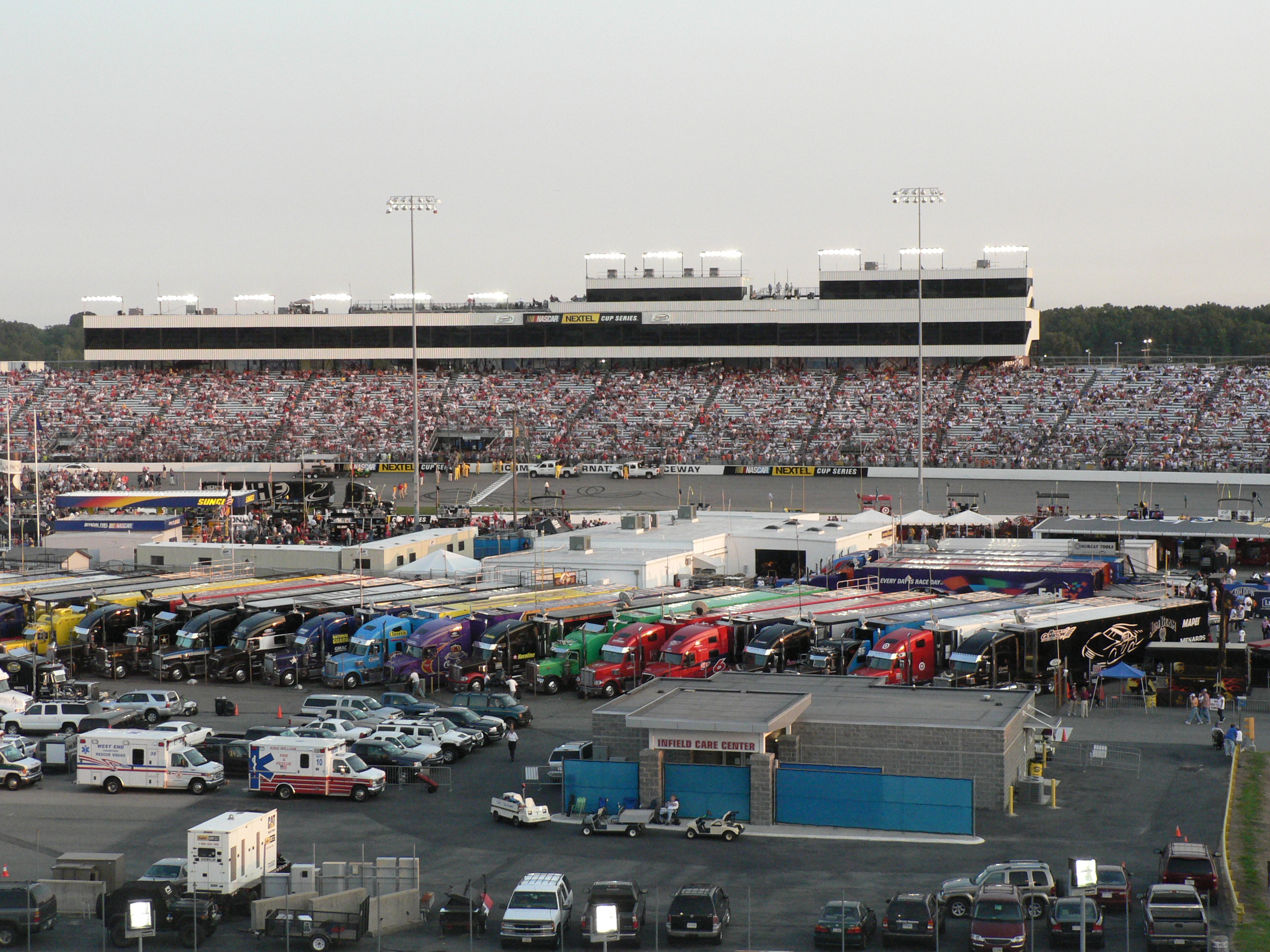
Richmond Raceway, the track where the race was held.

Richmond Raceway (RR) is a 0.75 miles (1.21 km), D-shaped, asphalt race track located just outside Richmond, Virginia in unincorporated Henrico County. It hosts the NASCAR Cup Series, NASCAR Xfinity Series and the NASCAR Craftsman Truck Series. Known as "America's premier short track", it has formerly hosted events such as the International Race of Champions, Denny Hamlin Short Track Showdown, and the USAC sprint car series. Due to Richmond Raceway's unique "D" shape which allows drivers to reach high speeds, Richmond has long been known as a short track that races like a superspeedway. With its multiple racing grooves, and proclivity for contact Richmond is a favorite among NASCAR drivers and fans.

=== Entry list ===
- (R) denotes rookie driver.
- (i) denotes driver who is ineligible for series driver points.

#	Driver	Team	Make
1	Brent Crews	Tricon Garage	Toyota
02	Nick Leitz (i)	Young's Motorsports	Chevrolet
2	Clayton Green	Reaume Brothers Racing	Ford
5	Toni Breidinger (R)	Tricon Garage	Toyota
7	Sammy Smith (i)	Spire Motorsports	Chevrolet
9	Grant Enfinger	CR7 Motorsports	Chevrolet
11	Corey Heim	Tricon Garage	Toyota
13	Jake Garcia	ThorSport Racing	Ford
15	Tanner Gray	Tricon Garage	Toyota
16	Christian Eckes (i)	McAnally-Hilgemann Racing	Chevrolet
17	Gio Ruggiero (R)	Tricon Garage	Toyota
18	Tyler Ankrum	McAnally-Hilgemann Racing	Chevrolet
19	Daniel Hemric	McAnally-Hilgemann Racing	Chevrolet
22	Stephen Mallozzi	Reaume Brothers Racing	Ford
26	Dawson Sutton (R)	Rackley W.A.R.	Chevrolet
33	Frankie Muniz (R)	Reaume Brothers Racing	Ford
34	Layne Riggs	Front Row Motorsports	Ford
38	Chandler Smith	Front Row Motorsports	Ford
41	Matt Gould	Niece Motorsports	Chevrolet
42	Matt Mills	Niece Motorsports	Chevrolet
44	Andrés Pérez de Lara (R)	Niece Motorsports	Chevrolet
45	Bayley Currey	Niece Motorsports	Chevrolet
52	Kaden Honeycutt	Halmar Friesen Racing	Toyota
66	Luke Fenhaus	ThorSport Racing	Ford
67	Ryan Roulette	Freedom Racing Enterprises	Chevrolet
71	Rajah Caruth	Spire Motorsports	Chevrolet
74	Caleb Costner	Mike Harmon Racing	Toyota
76	Spencer Boyd	Freedom Racing Enterprises	Chevrolet
77	Corey LaJoie	Spire Motorsports	Chevrolet
81	Connor Mosack (R)	McAnally-Hilgemann Racing	Chevrolet
84	Patrick Staropoli (i)	Cook Racing Technologies	Toyota
88	Matt Crafton	ThorSport Racing	Ford
97	Carson Kvapil (i)	CR7 Motorsports	Chevrolet
98	Ty Majeski	ThorSport Racing	Ford
99	Ben Rhodes	ThorSport Racing	Ford
Official entry list

== Practice ==
For practice, drivers were separated into two different groups, A and B. Both sessions were 25 minutes long, and was held on Friday, August 15, at 2:05 PM EST. Luke Fenhaus, driving for ThorSport Racing, would set the fastest time between both groups, with a lap of 23.332, and a speed of 115.721 mph (186.235 km/h).

Pos.	#	Driver	Team	Make	Time	Speed
1	66	Luke Fenhaus	ThorSport Racing	Ford	23.332	115.721
2	77	Corey LaJoie	Spire Motorsports	Chevrolet	23.357	115.597
3	16	Christian Eckes (i)	McAnally-Hilgemann Racing	Chevrolet	23.639	114.218
Full practice results

== Qualifying ==
Qualifying will be held on Friday, August 15, at 3:10 PM EST. Since Richmond Raceway is a short track, the qualifying procedure used is a single-car, two-lap system with one round. Drivers will be on track by themselves and will have two laps to post a qualifying time, and whoever sets the fastest lap will win the pole.

Corey Heim, driving for Tricon Garage, would score the pole for the race, with a lap of 23.095, and a speed of 116.908 mph (188.145 km/h).

No drivers would fail to qualify.

=== Qualifying results ===
Pos.	#	Driver	Team	Make	Time	Speed
1	11	Corey Heim	Tricon Garage	Toyota	23.095	116.908
2	98	Ty Majeski	ThorSport Racing	Ford	23.177	116.495
3	34	Layne Riggs	Front Row Motorsports	Ford	23.296	115.900
4	9	Grant Enfinger	CR7 Motorsports	Chevrolet	23.302	115.870
5	7	Sammy Smith (i)	Spire Motorsports	Chevrolet	23.312	115.820
6	38	Chandler Smith	Front Row Motorsports	Ford	23.355	115.607
7	88	Matt Crafton	ThorSport Racing	Ford	23.361	115.577
8	13	Jake Garcia	ThorSport Racing	Ford	23.386	115.454
9	16	Christian Eckes (i)	McAnally-Hilgemann Racing	Chevrolet	23.393	115.419
10	19	Daniel Hemric	McAnally-Hilgemann Racing	Chevrolet	23.430	115.237
11	52	Kaden Honeycutt	Halmar Friesen Racing	Toyota	23.449	115.144
12	26	Dawson Sutton (R)	Rackley W.A.R.	Chevrolet	23.475	115.016
13	45	Bayley Currey	Niece Motorsports	Chevrolet	23.476	115.011
14	81	Connor Mosack (R)	McAnally-Hilgemann Racing	Chevrolet	23.537	114.713
15	66	Luke Fenhaus	ThorSport Racing	Ford	23.538	114.708
16	18	Tyler Ankrum	McAnally-Hilgemann Racing	Chevrolet	23.551	114.645
17	99	Ben Rhodes	ThorSport Racing	Ford	23.577	114.518
18	15	Tanner Gray	Tricon Garage	Toyota	23.608	114.368
19	1	Brent Crews	Tricon Garage	Toyota	23.639	114.218
20	42	Matt Mills	Niece Motorsports	Chevrolet	23.644	114.194
21	71	Rajah Caruth	Spire Motorsports	Chevrolet	23.650	114.165
22	44	Andrés Pérez de Lara (R)	Niece Motorsports	Chevrolet	23.730	113.780
23	76	Spencer Boyd	Freedom Racing Enterprises	Chevrolet	23.730	113.780
24	84	Patrick Staropoli (i)	Cook Racing Technologies	Toyota	23.793	113.479
25	97	Carson Kvapil (i)	CR7 Motorsports	Chevrolet	23.838	113.265
26	77	Corey LaJoie	Spire Motorsports	Chevrolet	23.988	112.556
27	02	Nick Leitz (i)	Young's Motorsports	Chevrolet	24.049	112.271
28	33	Frankie Muniz (R)	Reaume Brothers Racing	Ford	24.116	111.959
29	41	Matt Gould	Niece Motorsports	Chevrolet	24.156	111.773
30	5	Toni Breidinger (R)	Tricon Garage	Toyota	24.474	110.321
31	22	Stephen Mallozzi	Reaume Brothers Racing	Ford	24.766	109.020
Qualified by owner's points
32	74	Caleb Costner	Mike Harmon Racing	Toyota	25.035	107.849
33	67	Ryan Roulette	Freedom Racing Enterprises	Chevrolet	25.043	107.815
34	2	Clayton Green	Reaume Brothers Racing	Ford	–	–
35	17	Gio Ruggiero (R)	Tricon Garage	Toyota	–	–
Official qualifying results
Official starting lineup

== Race results ==
Stage 1 Laps: 70

Pos.	#	Driver	Team	Make	Pts
1	98	Ty Majeski	ThorSport Racing	Ford	10
2	34	Layne Riggs	Front Row Motorsports	Ford	9
3	11	Corey Heim	Tricon Garage	Toyota	8
4	7	Sammy Smith (i)	Spire Motorsports	Chevrolet	0
5	38	Chandler Smith	Front Row Motorsports	Ford	6
6	52	Kaden Honeycutt	Halmar Friesen Racing	Toyota	5
7	16	Christian Eckes (i)	McAnally-Hilgemann Racing	Chevrolet	0
8	9	Grant Enfinger	CR7 Motorsports	Chevrolet	3
9	13	Jake Garcia	ThorSport Racing	Ford	2
10	88	Matt Crafton	ThorSport Racing	Ford	1

Stage 2 Laps: 70

Pos.	#	Driver	Team	Make	Pts
1	98	Ty Majeski	ThorSport Racing	Ford	10
2	13	Jake Garcia	ThorSport Racing	Ford	9
3	11	Corey Heim	Tricon Garage	Toyota	8
4	16	Christian Eckes (i)	McAnally-Hilgemann Racing	Chevrolet	0
5	9	Grant Enfinger	CR7 Motorsports	Chevrolet	6
6	52	Kaden Honeycutt	Halmar Friesen Racing	Toyota	5
7	99	Ben Rhodes	ThorSport Racing	Ford	4
8	38	Chandler Smith	Front Row Motorsports	Ford	3
9	18	Tyler Ankrum	McAnally-Hilgemann Racing	Chevrolet	2
10	34	Layne Riggs	Front Row Motorsports	Ford	1

Stage 3 Laps: 110

Fin	St	#	Driver	Team	Make	Laps	Led	Status	Pts
1	1	11	Corey Heim	Tricon Garage	Toyota	250	75	Running	56
2	2	98	Ty Majeski	ThorSport Racing	Ford	250	143	Running	55
3	3	34	Layne Riggs	Front Row Motorsports	Ford	250	0	Running	44
4	5	7	Sammy Smith (i)	Spire Motorsports	Chevrolet	250	31	Running	0
5	26	77	Corey LaJoie	Spire Motorsports	Chevrolet	250	0	Running	32
6	35	17	Gio Ruggiero (R)	Tricon Garage	Toyota	250	0	Running	31
7	8	13	Jake Garcia	ThorSport Racing	Ford	250	1	Running	41
8	17	99	Ben Rhodes	ThorSport Racing	Ford	250	0	Running	33
9	6	38	Chandler Smith	Front Row Motorsports	Ford	250	0	Running	37
10	11	52	Kaden Honeycutt	Halmar Friesen Racing	Toyota	250	0	Running	37
11	16	18	Tyler Ankrum	McAnally-Hilgemann Racing	Chevrolet	250	0	Running	28
12	9	16	Christian Eckes (i)	McAnally-Hilgemann Racing	Chevrolet	250	0	Running	0
13	4	9	Grant Enfinger	CR7 Motorsports	Chevrolet	250	0	Running	33
14	18	15	Tanner Gray	Tricon Garage	Toyota	249	0	Running	23
15	25	97	Carson Kvapil (i)	CR7 Motorsports	Chevrolet	249	0	Running	0
16	19	1	Brent Crews	Tricon Garage	Toyota	249	0	Running	21
17	20	42	Matt Mills	Niece Motorsports	Chevrolet	249	0	Running	20
18	14	81	Connor Mosack (R)	McAnally-Hilgemann Racing	Chevrolet	249	0	Running	19
19	21	71	Rajah Caruth	Spire Motorsports	Chevrolet	249	0	Running	18
20	13	45	Bayley Currey	Niece Motorsports	Chevrolet	248	0	Running	17
21	22	44	Andrés Pérez de Lara (R)	Niece Motorsports	Chevrolet	248	0	Running	16
22	15	66	Luke Fenhaus	ThorSport Racing	Ford	248	0	Running	15
23	24	84	Patrick Staropoli (i)	Cook Racing Technologies	Toyota	247	0	Running	0
24	30	5	Toni Breidinger (R)	Tricon Garage	Toyota	247	0	Running	13
25	29	41	Matt Gould	Niece Motorsports	Chevrolet	247	0	Running	12
26	7	88	Matt Crafton	ThorSport Racing	Ford	247	0	Running	12
27	27	02	Nick Leitz (i)	Young's Motorsports	Chevrolet	246	0	Running	0
28	23	76	Spencer Boyd	Freedom Racing Enterprises	Chevrolet	245	0	Running	9
29	33	67	Ryan Roulette	Freedom Racing Enterprises	Chevrolet	240	0	Running	8
30	32	74	Caleb Costner	Mike Harmon Racing	Toyota	239	0	Running	7
31	12	26	Dawson Sutton (R)	Rackley W.A.R.	Chevrolet	223	0	Running	6
32	28	33	Frankie Muniz (R)	Reaume Brothers Racing	Ford	208	0	Running	5
33	10	19	Daniel Hemric	McAnally-Hilgemann Racing	Chevrolet	186	0	Running	5
34	31	22	Stephen Mallozzi	Reaume Brothers Racing	Ford	5	0	Mechanical	3
35	34	2	Clayton Green	Reaume Brothers Racing	Ford	2	0	Mechanical	2
Official race results

== Standings after the race ==
Drivers' Championship standings

	Pos	Driver	Points
	1	Corey Heim	2,065
	2	Layne Riggs	2,026 (–39)
	3	Chandler Smith	2,019 (–46)
	4	Daniel Hemric	2,011 (–54)
2	5	Tyler Ankrum	2,010 (–55)
	6	Ty Majeski	2,010 (–55)
2	7	Grant Enfinger	2,007 (–58)
4	8	Rajah Caruth	2,005 (–60)
1	9	Kaden Honeycutt	2,003 (–62)
1	10	Jake Garcia	2,002 (–63)
Official driver's standings

Manufacturers' Championship standings

	Pos	Manufacturer	Points
1	1	Chevrolet	651
1	2	Toyota	649 (–2)
	3	Ford	625 (–26)

- Note: Only the first 10 positions are included for the driver standings.

Previous race: 2025 Mission 176 at The Glen	NASCAR Craftsman Truck Series; 2025 season	Next race: 2025 Sober or Slammer 200
