= 2024 Dutch Boy 150 =

4th race of the 2024 ARCA Menards Series East

Race details
- Race 4 of 8 of the 2024 ARCA Menards Series East
- Date: May 18, 2024
- Official name: 2nd Annual Dutch Boy 150
- Location: Flat Rock Speedway in Ash Township, Michigan
- Course: Permanent racing facility
- Course length: 0.25 miles (0.40 km)
- Distance: 150 laps, 37 mi (60 km)
- Scheduled distance: 150 laps, 37 mi (60 km)
- Average speed: 69.362 mph (111.627 km/h)

Pole position
Driver	Connor Zilisch	Pinnacle Racing Group
- Time: 12.724

Most laps led
Driver	Connor Zilisch	Pinnacle Racing Group
- Laps: 150

Winner
No. 28	Connor Zilisch	Pinnacle Racing Group

Television in the United States
- Network: FloRacing
- Announcers: Charles Krall

Radio in the United States
- Radio: ARCA Racing Network

The 2024 Dutch Boy 150 was the 4th stock car race of the 2024 ARCA Menards Series East season, and the 2nd iteration of the event. The race was held on Saturday, May 18, 2024, at Flat Rock Speedway in Ash Township, Michigan, a 0.25 mile (0.40 km) permanent asphalt oval shaped short track. The race took the scheduled 150 laps to complete. Connor Zilisch, driving for Pinnacle Racing Group, would absolutely obliterate the field, starting from the pole and leading every lap of the race to earn his second career ARCA Menards Series East win, and his second of the season. To fill out the podium, William Sawalich, driving for Joe Gibbs Racing, and Gio Ruggiero, driving for Venturini Motorsports, would finish 2nd and 3rd, respectively.

== Report ==
=== Background ===
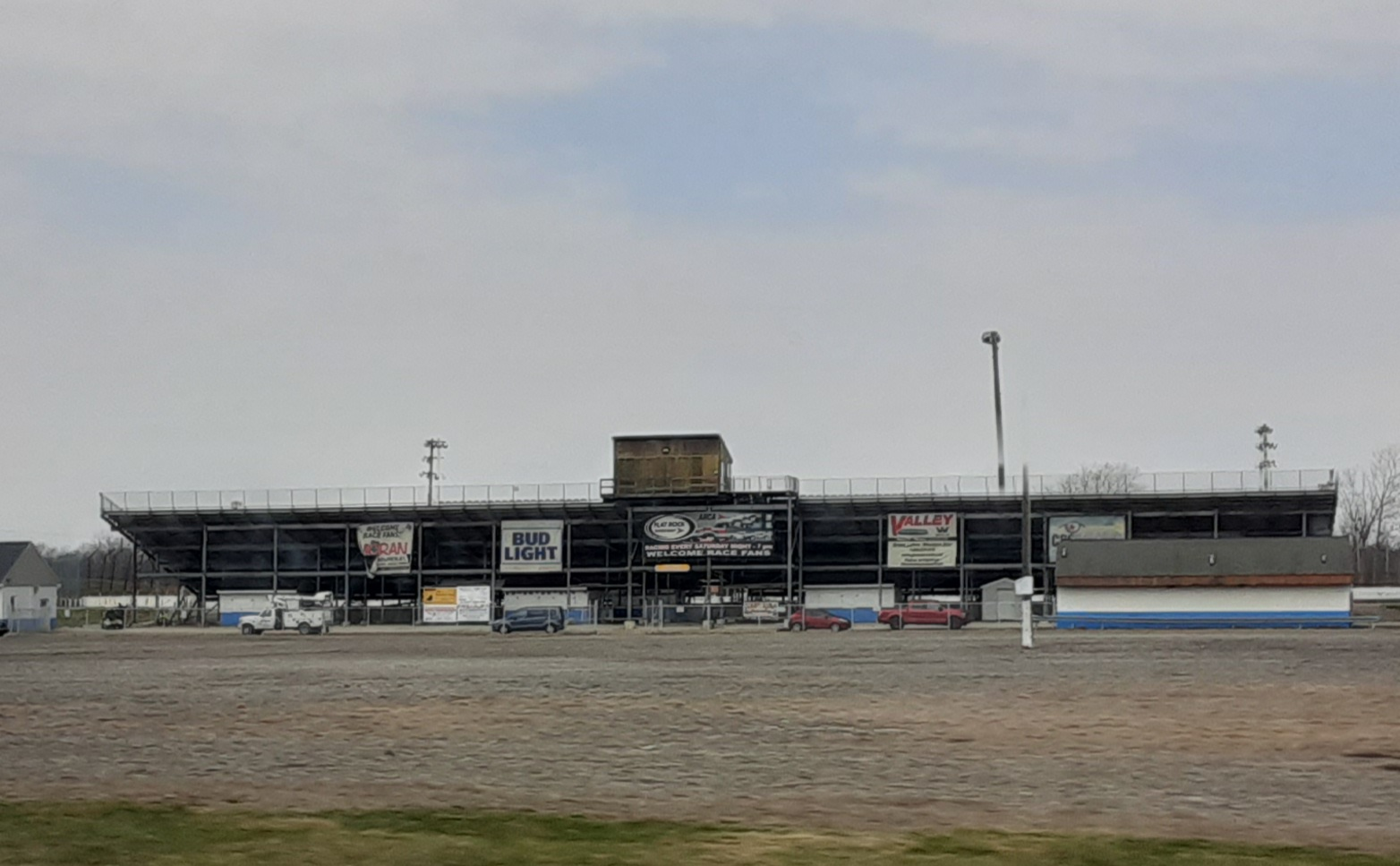
Flat Rock Speedway, the circuit where the race was held

Flat Rock Speedway is a race track in Monroe County in the U.S. state of Michigan. It is located in Ash Township just south of the city of Flat Rock along U.S. Route 24. Opened in 1953, it is owned by NASCAR and is the sister track to Toledo Speedway. It features racing on Saturday nights that include Outlaw Body Late Models, Street Stocks, and Figure 8s for its weekly divisions. It is the closest NASCAR-style oval track racing circuit to Detroit, Michigan.

==== Entry list ====
- (R) denotes rookie driver.

#	Driver	Team	Make	Sponsor
0	Nate Moeller	Wayne Peterson Racing	Ford	Peterson Motorsports
01	Blaine Donahue	Fast Track Racing	Toyota	PALM Charter School
06	Cody Dennison (R)	Wayne Peterson Racing	Toyota	Timcast
10	Jayson Alexander	Fast Track Racing	Toyota	Selwyn Pub / Constant Contact
11	Zachary Tinkle	Fast Track Racing	Toyota	Racing for Rescues
12	Matt Kemp	Fast Track Racing	Toyota	Work for Green Shield Deck Builders
18	William Sawalich	Joe Gibbs Racing	Toyota	Starkey / SoundGear
20	Gio Ruggiero (R)	Venturini Motorsports	Toyota	JBL
28	Connor Zilisch (R)	Pinnacle Racing Group	Chevrolet	Chevrolet / Silver Hare Development
31	Rita Goulet	Rise Motorsports	Chevrolet	NationalPolice.org
39	D. L. Wilson	CW Motorsports	Toyota	Heart O' Texas Speedway / ETR
48	Brad Smith	Brad Smith Motorsports	Ford	Copraya.com
55	Toni Breidinger	Venturini Motorsports	Toyota	Venturini Motorsports
65	Jeffery MacZink	MacZink Racing	Toyota	Syncon Performance Flooring
93	Colton Collins	CW Motorsports	Chevrolet	Thin Blue Wine Cellars
99	Michael Maples (R)	Fast Track Racing	Chevrolet	Don Ray Petroleum LLC
Official entry list

== Practice ==
The first and only practice session was held on Saturday, May 18, at 3:30 p.m. EST, and would last for 60 minutes. William Sawalich, driving for Joe Gibbs Racing, would set the fastest time in the session, with a lap of 12.907, and a speed of 69.730 mph (112.220 km/h).

Pos.	#	Driver	Team	Make	Time	Speed
1	18	William Sawalich	Joe Gibbs Racing	Toyota	12.907	69.730
2	28	Connor Zilisch (R)	Pinnacle Racing Group	Chevrolet	13.033	69.055
3	20	Gio Ruggiero (R)	Venturini Motorsports	Toyota	13.155	68.415
Full practice results

== Qualifying ==
Qualifying was held on Saturday, May 18, at 5:10 p.m. EST. The qualifying system used is a single-car, two-lap based system. All drivers will be on track by themselves and will have two laps to post a qualifying time. The driver who sets the fastest time in qualifying will win the pole.

Connor Zilisch, driving for Pinnacle Racing Group, would score the pole for the race, with a lap of 12.724, and a speed of 70.732 mph (113.832 km/h).

Nate Moeller would withdraw from the race.

=== Qualifying results ===
Pos.	#	Driver	Team	Make	Time	Speed
1	28	Connor Zilisch (R)	Pinnacle Racing Group	Chevrolet	12.724	70.732
2	20	Gio Ruggiero (R)	Venturini Motorsports	Toyota	12.764	70.511
3	18	William Sawalich	Joe Gibbs Racing	Toyota	12.796	70.334
4	11	Zachary Tinkle	Fast Track Racing	Toyota	13.044	68.997
5	55	Toni Breidinger	Venturini Motorsports	Toyota	13.062	68.902
6	12	Matt Kemp	Fast Track Racing	Toyota	13.202	68.171
7	01	Blaine Donahue	Fast Track Racing	Toyota	13.356	67.385
8	65	Jeffery MacZink	MacZink Racing	Toyota	13.365	67.340
9	93	Colton Collins	CW Motorsports	Chevrolet	13.502	66.657
10	10	Jayson Alexander	Fast Track Racing	Toyota	13.553	66.406
11	39	D. L. Wilson	CW Motorsports	Toyota	13.655	65.910
12	99	Michael Maples (R)	Fast Track Racing	Chevrolet	13.681	65.785
13	06	Cody Dennison (R)	Wayne Peterson Racing	Toyota	13.833	65.062
14	31	Rita Goulet	Rise Motorsports	Chevrolet	14.149	63.609
15	48	Brad Smith	Brad Smith Motorsports	Ford	14.416	62.431
16	0	Nate Moeller	Wayne Peterson Racing	Ford	–	–
Official qualifying results

== Race results ==
Fin	St	#	Driver	Team	Make	Laps	Led	Status	Pts
1	1	28	Connor Zilisch (R)	Pinnacle Racing Group	Chevrolet	150	150	Running	49
2	3	18	William Sawalich	Joe Gibbs Racing	Toyota	150	0	Running	42
3	2	20	Gio Ruggiero (R)	Venturini Motorsports	Toyota	150	0	Running	41
4	5	55	Toni Breidinger	Venturini Motorsports	Toyota	150	0	Running	40
5	4	11	Zachary Tinkle	Fast Track Racing	Toyota	148	0	Running	39
6	6	12	Matt Kemp	Fast Track Racing	Toyota	147	0	Running	38
7	7	01	Blaine Donahue	Fast Track Racing	Toyota	146	0	Running	37
8	10	10	Jayson Alexander	Fast Track Racing	Toyota	145	0	Running	36
9	11	39	D. L. Wilson	CW Motorsports	Toyota	144	0	Running	35
10	13	06	Cody Dennison (R)	Wayne Peterson Racing	Toyota	143	0	Running	34
11	9	93	Colton Collins	CW Motorsports	Chevrolet	141	0	Running	33
12	12	99	Michael Maples (R)	Fast Track Racing	Chevrolet	140	0	Running	32
13	8	65	Jeffery MacZink	MacZink Racing	Toyota	140	0	Running	31
14	14	31	Rita Goulet	Rise Motorsports	Chevrolet	140	0	Running	30
15	15	48	Brad Smith	Brad Smith Motorsports	Ford	16	0	Accident	29
16	16	0	Nate Moeller	Wayne Peterson Racing	Ford	9	0	Accident	28
Official race results

== Standings after the race ==
Drivers' Championship standings

	Pos	Driver	Points
	1	Connor Zilisch	179
	2	William Sawalich	167 (-12)
	3	Gio Ruggiero	163 (–16)
	4	Zachary Tinkle	149 (–30)
	5	D. L. Wilson	137 (–42)
	6	Cody Dennison	133 (–46)
	7	Michael Maples	126 (–53)
	8	Rita Goulet	113 (–66)
6	9	Nate Moeller	83 (–96)
1	10	Hunter Wright	74 (–105)

- Note: Only the first 10 positions are included for the driver standings.

Previous race: 2024 Music City 150	ARCA Menards Series East; 2024 season	Next race: 2024 Atlas 150
