= Jayson Alexander =

American racing driver (born 2002)

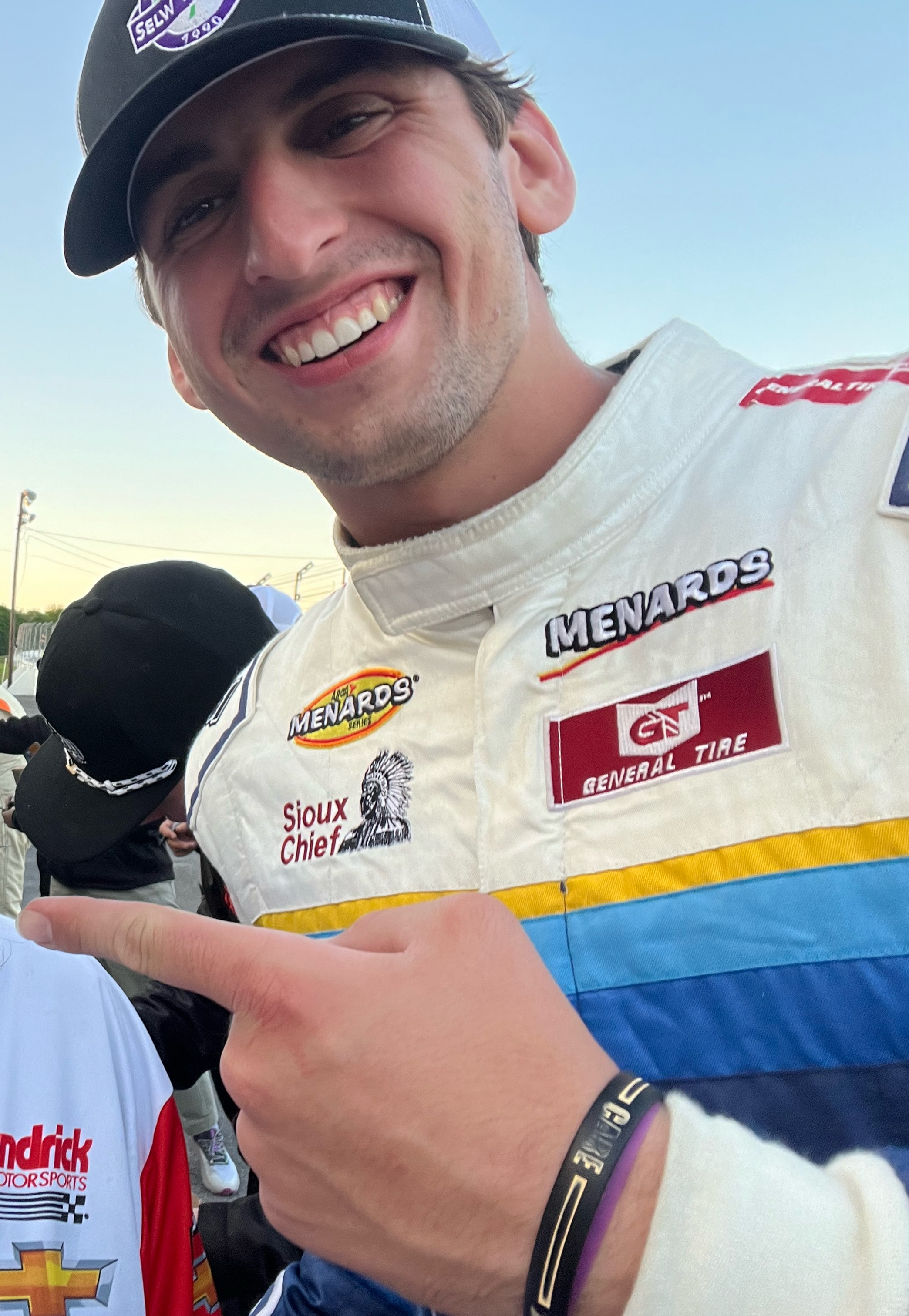
- Alexander at Nashville Fairgrounds Speedway in 2024
- Born: Jayson Blaine Alexander; November 13, 2002 (age 24); Apex, North Carolina, U.S.

NASCAR FedEx Freight Truck Series career
- 4 races run over 2 years
- 2025 position: 58th
- Best finish: 58th (2025)
- First race: 2024 LiUNA! 175 (Milwaukee)
- Last race: 2025 EJP 175 (New Hampshire)
Wins	Top tens	Poles
0	0	0

ARCA Menards Series career
- 3 races run over 1 year
- Best finish: 53rd (2024)
- First race: 2024 General Tire 150 (Charlotte)
- Last race: 2024 Henry Ford Health 200 (Michigan)
Wins	Top tens	Poles
0	0	0

ARCA Menards Series East career
- 3 races run over 1 year
- Best finish: 23rd (2024)
- First race: 2024 Music City 150 (Nashville)
- Last race: 2024 Circle City 200 (IRP)
Wins	Top tens	Poles
0	2	0
- Statistics up to date as of October 31, 2025.

Jayson Blaine Alexander (born November 13, 2002) is an American professional stock car racing driver. He last competed part-time in the NASCAR Craftsman Truck Series, driving the No. 02 Chevrolet Silverado RST for Young's Motorsports. He has also competed part-time in the ARCA Menards Series and ARCA Menards Series East.

== Racing career ==
Alexander began his racing career at the age of eighteen, where he served an under an internship from Reaume Brothers Racing, and competed in series such as the Carolina Pro Late Model Series and the Sprint Invaders Series whilst serving as a development driver for Costner Weaver Motorsports.

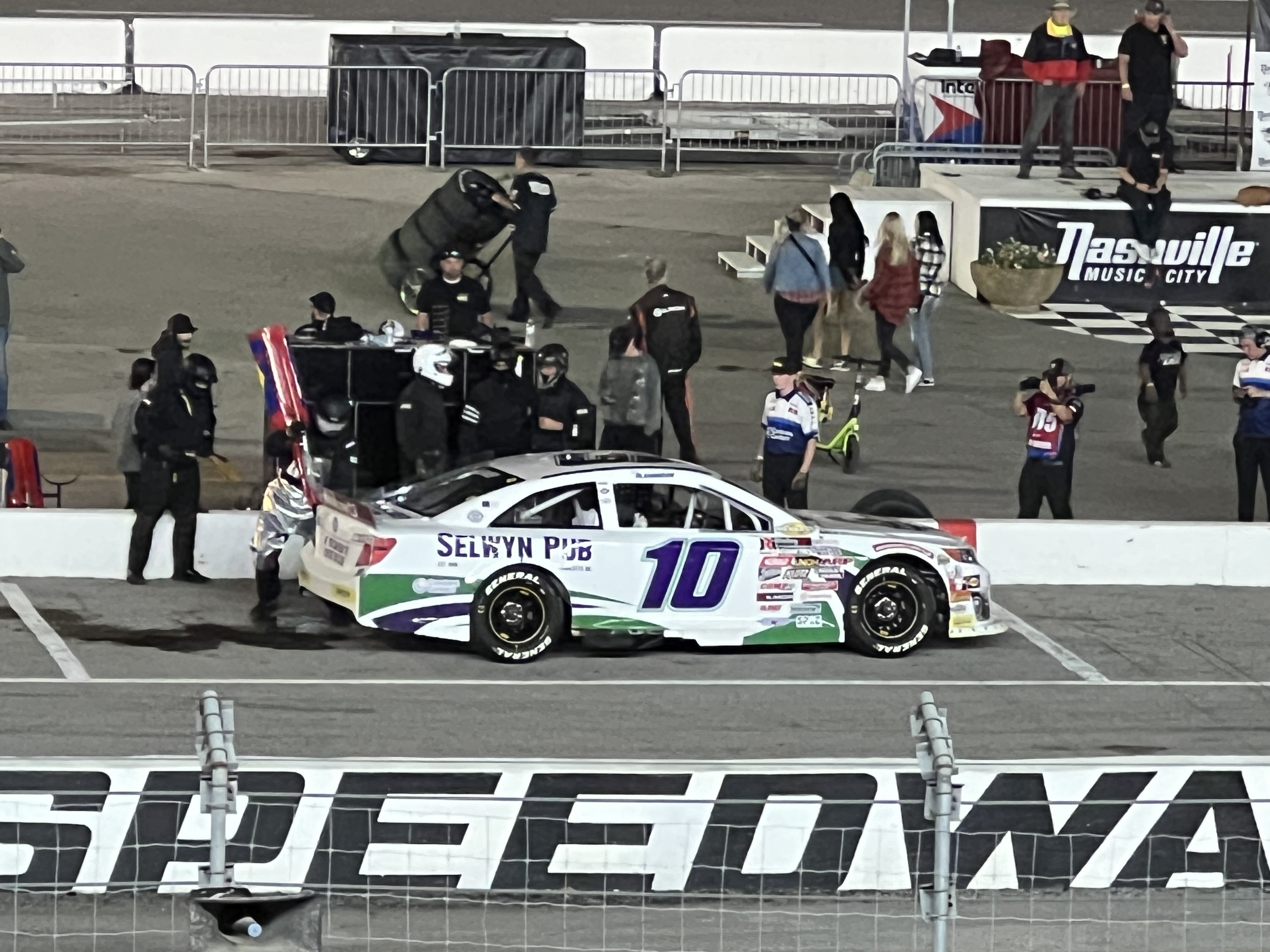
Alexander's No. 10 car at Nashville Fairgrounds Speedway in 2024

In 2024, it was announced that Alexander would drive a partial schedule for Fast Track Racing in the ARCA Menards Series. He made his debut in the ARCA Menards Series East race at Nashville Fairgrounds Speedway, driving the No. 10 Toyota, where after placing fourteenth in the lone practice session, he qualified in twelfth and finished one lap down in eighth place. He then ran the following race at Flat Rock Speedway, again driving the No. 10 Toyota, where after placing seventh in the lone practice session, he qualified in tenth and finished four laps down in eighth place. Afterwards, it was then revealed that Alexander would be making his main ARCA Series debut at Charlotte Motor Speedway, this time driving the No. 11 Ford, where after placing twentieth in the lone practice session, he qualified in twentieth but finished in 29th after suffering sway bar issues due to suffering early damage due to a cut tire. Alexander would run the East series combination race at IRP in the No. 10, where he started 23rd and finished 18th. He returned to the No. 10 at Michigan, where he started 19th and finished in 13th.

On August 22, 2024, it was announced that Alexander would attempt to make his NASCAR Craftsman Truck Series debut at the Milwaukee Mile, driving the No. 21 Ford for Floridian Motorsports. After starting last, he would finish in the same spot, as he would hit the outside wall on lap 48 and retire from the event.

On May 7, 2025, Young's Motorsports announced that Alexander would run three Truck Series races for the team in their No. 02 truck in 2025, starting at North Wilkesboro Speedway.

== Personal life ==
Alexander resides in Apex, North Carolina, and is currently enlisted in the North Carolina Army National Guard.

Alexander attended Queens University of Charlotte where he played men's lacrosse and graduated with a degree in business administration.

Alexander is the co-owner of Premier Performance Group, a driver agency he cofounded with Caleb Costner and is also an ambassador for the Wings and Wheels Foundation.

== Motorsports results ==
=== Stock car career summary ===
Season	Series	Team	Races	Wins	Top 5	Top 10	Points	Position
2024	ARCA Menards Series East	Fast Track Racing	3	0	0	2	98	23rd
2024	ARCA Menards Series	Fast Track Racing	3	0	0	0	72	53rd
2024	NASCAR Craftsman Truck Series	Floridian Motorsports	1	0	0	0	1	78th
2025	NASCAR Craftsman Truck Series	Young's Motorsports	3	0	0	0	19	58th

=== NASCAR ===
(key) (Bold – Pole position awarded by qualifying time. Italics – Pole position earned by points standings or practice time. * – Most laps led.)

==== Craftsman Truck Series ====
NASCAR Craftsman Truck Series results
Year	Team	No.	Make	1	2	3	4	5	6	7	8	9	10	11	12	13	14	15	16	17	18	19	20	21	22	23	24	25	NCTC	Pts	Ref
2024	Floridian Motorsports	21	Ford	DAY	ATL	LVS	BRI	COA	MAR	TEX	KAN	DAR	NWS	CLT	GTW	NSH	POC	IRP	RCH	MLW; 36	BRI	KAN	TAL	HOM	MAR	PHO			78th	1	
2025	Young's Motorsports	02	Chevy	DAY	ATL	LVS	HOM	MAR	BRI	CAR	TEX	KAN	NWS; 30	CLT	NSH	MCH	POC	LRP	IRP; 30	GLN	RCH	DAR	BRI	NHA; 32	ROV	TAL	MAR	PHO	58th	19	

^{*} Season still in progress
^{1} Ineligible for series points

=== ARCA Menards Series ===
(key) (Bold – Pole position awarded by qualifying time. Italics – Pole position earned by points standings or practice time. * – Most laps led.)

ARCA Menards Series results
Year	Team	No.	Make	1	2	3	4	5	6	7	8	9	10	11	12	13	14	15	16	17	18	19	20	AMSC	Pts	Ref
2024	Fast Track Racing	11	Ford	DAY	PHO	TAL	DOV	KAN	CLT; 29	IOW	MOH	BLN												53rd	72	
2024	Fast Track Racing	10	Ford										IRP; 18	SLM	ELK									53rd	72	
2024	Fast Track Racing	10	Toyota													MCH; 13	ISF	MLW	DSF	GLN	BRI	KAN	TOL	53rd	72	

==== ARCA Menards Series East ====
ARCA Menards Series East results
Year	Team	No.	Make	1	2	3	4	5	6	7	8	AMSEC	Pts	Ref
2024	Fast Track Racing	10	Toyota	FIF	DOV	NSV; 8	FRS; 8	IOW				23rd	98	
2024	Fast Track Racing	10	Ford						IRP; 18	MLW	BRI	23rd	98	
