= 2024 Henry Ford Health 200 =

13th race of the 2024 ARCA Menards Series

Race details
- Race 13 of 20 of the 2024 ARCA Menards Series
- Date: August 16, 2024
- Official name: 36th Annual Henry Ford Health 200
- Location: Michigan International Speedway in Brooklyn, Michigan
- Course: Permanent racing facility
- Course length: 3.2 km (2.0 miles)
- Distance: 100 laps, 200 mi (320 km)
- Scheduled distance: 100 laps, 200 mi (320 km)

Pole position
Driver	Andrés Pérez de Lara	Rev Racing
- Time: 39.310

Most laps led
Driver	Tanner Gray	Joe Gibbs Racing
- Laps: 55

Winner
No. 28	Connor Zilisch	Pinnacle Racing Group

Television in the United States
- Network: FS1
- Announcers: Jamie Little, Phil Parsons, and Trevor Bayne

Radio in the United States
- Radio: MRN

The 2024 Henry Ford Health 200 was the 13th stock car race of the 2024 ARCA Menards Series season, and the 36th iteration of the event. The race was held on Friday, August 16, 2024, at Michigan International Speedway in Brooklyn, Michigan, a 2.0 mile (3.2 km) permanent quad-oval shaped racetrack. The race took the scheduled 100 laps to complete. Connor Zilisch, driving for Pinnacle Racing Group, would continue his winning streak, passing the leader Tanner Gray on a late restart and holding off Andrés Pérez de Lara in the final laps to earn his fourth career ARCA Menards Series win, and his fourth of the season. Gray dominated the majority of the event, leading a race-high 55 laps before falling back on a late restart and finishing 3rd. Perez won the pole and led six laps, he was unable to get past Zilisch and finished 2nd.

== Report ==
=== Background ===
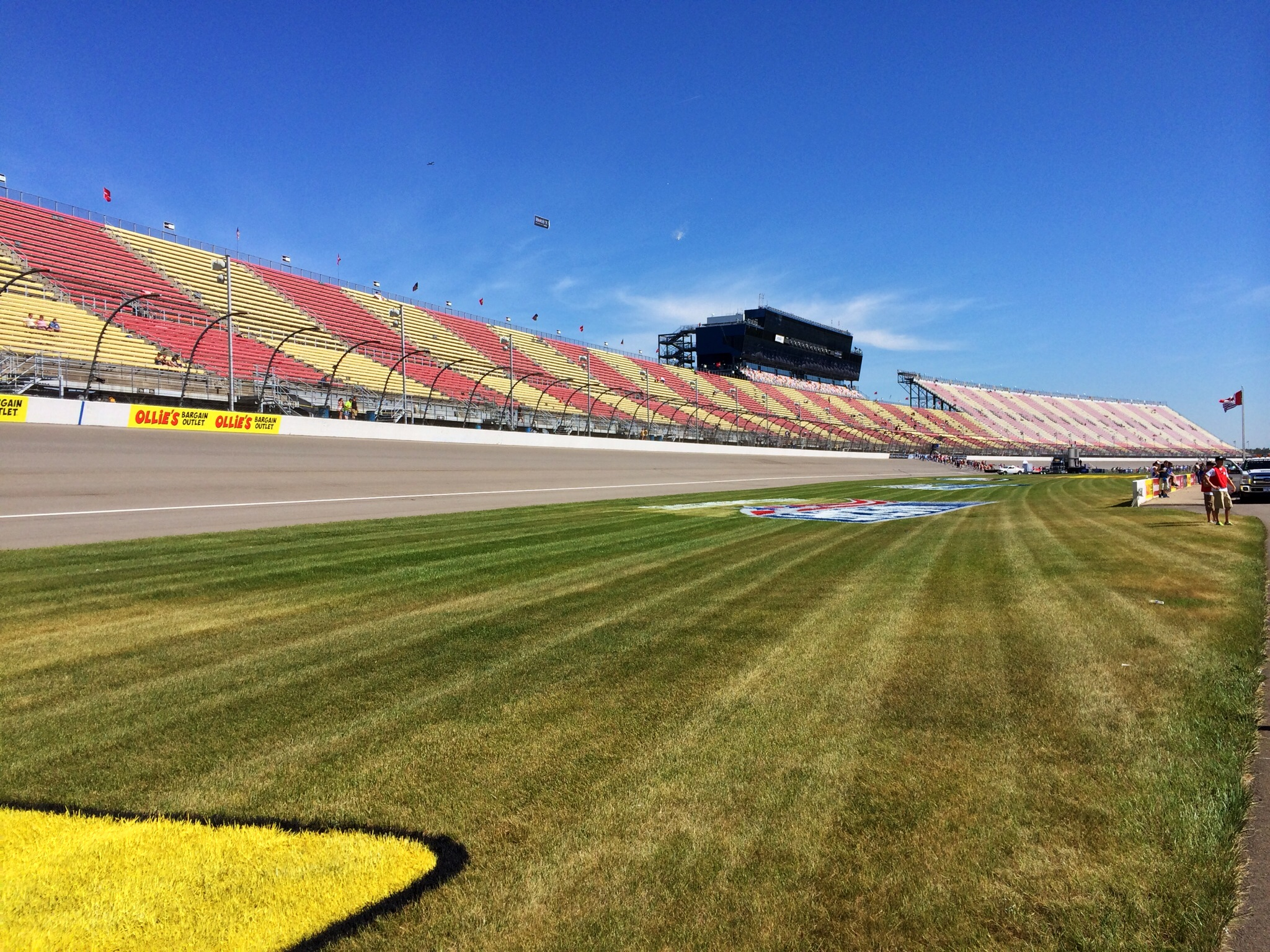
Michigan International Speedway, the circuit where the race was held.

Michigan International Speedway is a two-mile (3.2 km) moderate-banked D-shaped speedway located in Brooklyn, Michigan. The track is used primarily for NASCAR events. It is known as a "sister track" to Texas World Speedway as MIS's oval design was a direct basis of TWS, with moderate modifications to the banking in the corners, and was used as the basis of Auto Club Speedway. The track is owned by International Speedway Corporation. Michigan International Speedway is recognized as one of motorsports' premier facilities because of its wide racing surface and high banking (by open-wheel standards; the 18-degree banking is modest by stock car standards).

==== Entry list ====
- (R) denotes rookie driver.

#	Driver	Team	Make	Sponsor
2	Andrés Pérez de Lara	Rev Racing	Chevrolet	Max Siegel Inc.
03	Alex Clubb	Clubb Racing Inc.	Ford	A. Clubb Lawn Care & Landscaping
06	Nate Moeller	Wayne Peterson Racing	Ford	Ocean Pipe Works
6	Lavar Scott (R)	Rev Racing	Chevrolet	Max Siegel Inc.
10	Jayson Alexander	Fast Track Racing	Toyota	Premier Performance Group
11	Cody Dennison (R)	Fast Track Racing	Toyota	Timcast
12	Ryan Roulette	Fast Track Racing	Ford	Bellator Recruiting Academy / VFW
15	Kris Wright	Venturini Motorsports	Toyota	FNB Corporation
18	Tanner Gray	Joe Gibbs Racing	Toyota	Place of Hope
20	Jake Finch	Venturini Motorsports	Toyota	Phoenix Construction
22	Amber Balcaen	Venturini Motorsports	Toyota	ICON Direct
25	Toni Breidinger	Venturini Motorsports	Toyota	Sunoco
27	Tim Richmond	Richmond Motorsports	Toyota	Latino Immigration & Legal Center
28	Connor Zilisch	Pinnacle Racing Group	Chevrolet	Chevrolet / Silver Hare Development
31	Casey Carden	Rise Motorsports	Chevrolet	Epic Insurance
32	Christian Rose	AM Racing	Ford	West Virginia Department of Tourism
33	Frankie Muniz	Reaume Brothers Racing	Ford	VYPER
35	Greg Van Alst	Greg Van Alst Motorsports	Ford	CB Fabricating / Top Choice Fence
48	Brad Smith	Brad Smith Motorsports	Ford	Ski's Graphics
55	Gus Dean	Venturini Motorsports	Toyota	Dean Custom Air
65	Jeffery MacZink	MacZink Racing	Toyota	Syncon / Parkway Services
73	Andy Jankowiak	KLAS Motorsports	Toyota	Acacia Energy
97	Jason Kitzmiller	CR7 Motorsports	Chevrolet	A. L. L. Construction
99	Michael Maples (R)	Fast Track Racing	Chevrolet	Don Ray Petroleum LLC
Official entry list

== Practice ==
The first and only practice session was originally scheduled to be held on Friday, August 16, at 1:30 PM EST, but due to inclement weather, the session was postponed until 2:15 PM EST, and would last for 30 minutes. Andrés Pérez de Lara, driving for Rev Racing, would set the fastest time in the session, with a lap of 39.310, and a speed of 183.160 mph (294.767 km/h).

Pos.	#	Driver	Team	Make	Time	Speed
1	2	Andrés Pérez de Lara	Rev Racing	Chevrolet	39.310	183.160
2	55	Gus Dean	Venturini Motorsports	Toyota	39.335	183.043
3	28	Connor Zilisch	Pinnacle Racing Group	Chevrolet	39.359	182.931
Full practice results

== Starting lineup ==
Qualifying was originally scheduled to be held on Friday, August 16, at 2:30 PM EST. The qualifying system used is a multi-car, multi-lap based system. All drivers will be on track for a 20-minute timed session, and whoever sets the fastest time in that session will win the pole.

Qualifying was cancelled due to inclement weather. The starting lineup would be determined by practice speeds. As a result, Andrés Pérez de Lara, driving for Rev Racing, will start on the pole.

=== Starting lineup ===
Pos.	#	Driver	Team	Make	Time	Speed
1	2	Andrés Pérez de Lara	Rev Racing	Chevrolet	39.310	183.160
2	55	Gus Dean	Venturini Motorsports	Toyota	39.335	183.043
3	28	Connor Zilisch	Pinnacle Racing Group	Chevrolet	39.359	182.931
4	18	Tanner Gray	Joe Gibbs Racing	Toyota	39.473	182.403
5	73	Andy Jankowiak	KLAS Motorsports	Toyota	39.620	181.726
6	15	Kris Wright	Venturini Motorsports	Toyota	39.815	180.836
7	35	Greg Van Alst	Greg Van Alst Motorsports	Ford	40.093	179.582
8	20	Jake Finch	Venturini Motorsports	Toyota	40.355	178.417
9	6	Lavar Scott (R)	Rev Racing	Chevrolet	40.421	178.125
10	22	Amber Balcaen	Venturini Motorsports	Toyota	40.553	177.545
11	32	Christian Rose	AM Racing	Ford	40.627	177.222
12	33	Frankie Muniz	Reaume Brothers Racing	Ford	40.960	175.781
13	97	Jason Kitzmiller	CR7 Motorsports	Chevrolet	41.033	175.469
14	27	Tim Richmond	Richmond Motorsports	Toyota	41.891	171.875
15	65	Jeffery MacZink	MacZink Racing	Toyota	41.944	171.657
16	11	Cody Dennison (R)	Fast Track Racing	Toyota	42.085	171.082
17	12	Ryan Roulette	Fast Track Racing	Ford	42.783	168.291
18	99	Michael Maples (R)	Fast Track Racing	Chevrolet	43.588	165.183
19	10	Jayson Alexander	Fast Track Racing	Toyota	45.078	159.723
20	48	Brad Smith	Brad Smith Motorsports	Ford	46.953	153.345
21	31	Casey Carden	Rise Motorsports	Chevrolet	48.052	149.838
22	06	Nate Moeller	Wayne Peterson Racing	Ford	1:02.010	116.110
23	25	Toni Breidinger	Venturini Motorsports	Toyota	–	–
24	03	Alex Clubb	Clubb Racing Inc.	Ford	–	–
Official starting lineup

== Race results ==
Fin	St	#	Driver	Team	Make	Laps	Led	Status	Pts
1	3	28	Connor Zilisch	Pinnacle Racing Group	Chevrolet	100	39	Running	47
2	1	2	Andrés Pérez de Lara	Rev Racing	Chevrolet	100	6	Running	44
3	4	18	Tanner Gray	Joe Gibbs Racing	Toyota	100	55	Running	43
4	8	20	Jake Finch	Venturini Motorsports	Toyota	100	0	Running	40
5	6	15	Kris Wright	Venturini Motorsports	Toyota	100	0	Running	39
6	7	35	Greg Van Alst	Greg Van Alst Motorsports	Ford	100	0	Running	38
7	13	97	Jason Kitzmiller	CR7 Motorsports	Chevrolet	100	0	Running	37
8	23	25	Toni Breidinger	Venturini Motorsports	Toyota	100	0	Running	36
9	11	32	Christian Rose	AM Racing	Ford	98	0	Running	35
10	10	22	Amber Balcaen	Venturini Motorsports	Toyota	98	0	Running	34
11	16	11	Cody Dennison (R)	Fast Track Racing	Toyota	97	0	Running	33
12	12	33	Frankie Muniz	Reaume Brothers Racing	Ford	96	0	Running	32
13	19	10	Jayson Alexander	Fast Track Racing	Toyota	94	0	Running	31
14	2	55	Gus Dean	Venturini Motorsports	Toyota	93	0	Running	30
15	9	6	Lavar Scott (R)	Rev Racing	Chevrolet	89	0	Running	29
16	17	12	Ryan Roulette	Fast Track Racing	Ford	89	0	Running	28
17	15	65	Jeffery MacZink	MacZink Racing	Toyota	88	0	Running	27
18	24	03	Alex Clubb	Clubb Racing Inc.	Ford	85	0	Running	26
19	5	73	Andy Jankowiak	KLAS Motorsports	Toyota	83	0	Accident	25
20	18	99	Michael Maples (R)	Fast Track Racing	Chevrolet	71	0	DNF	24
21	20	48	Brad Smith	Brad Smith Motorsports	Ford	44	0	Overheating	23
22	14	27	Tim Richmond	Richmond Motorsports	Toyota	30	0	DNF	22
23	21	31	Casey Carden	Rise Motorsports	Chevrolet	6	0	Clutch	21
24	22	06	Nate Moeller	Wayne Peterson Racing	Ford	5	0	Too Slow	20
Official race results

== Standings after the race ==
Drivers' Championship standings

Pos	Driver	Points
1	Andrés Pérez de Lara	606
2	Lavar Scott	548 (-58)
3	Greg Van Alst	535 (–71)
4	Kris Wright	530 (–76)
5	Christian Rose	507 (–99)
6	Toni Breidinger	503 (–103)
7	Amber Balcaen	489 (–117)
8	Michael Maples	445 (–161)
9	Cody Dennison	440 (–166)
10	Alex Clubb	430 (–177)

- Note: Only the first 10 positions are included for the driver standings.

Previous race: 2024 Shore Lunch 250	ARCA Menards Series; 2024 season	Next race: 2024 Springfield ARCA 100
