= 2024 Atlas 150 =

7th race of the 2024 ARCA Menards Series

Race details
- Race 7 of 20 of the 2024 ARCA Menards Series; Race 5 of 8 of the 2024 ARCA Menards Series East
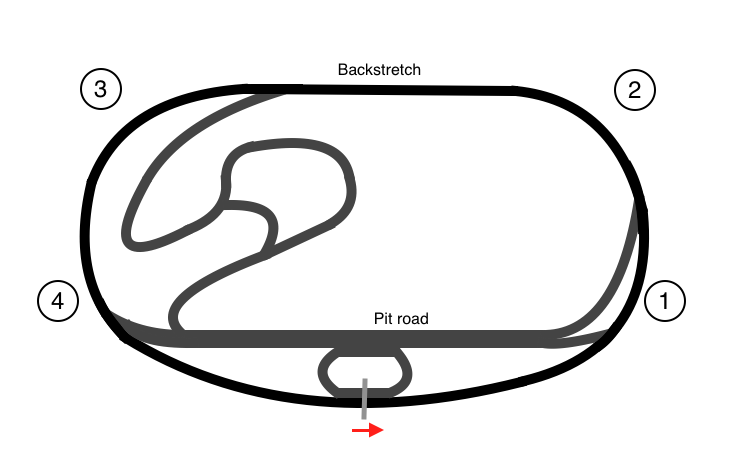
- Date: June 14, 2024
- Official name: 18th Annual Atlas 150
- Location: Iowa Speedway in Newton, Iowa
- Course: Permanent racing facility
- Course length: 0.875 miles (1.408 km)
- Distance: 150 laps, 131 mi (211 km)
- Scheduled distance: 150 laps, 131 mi (211 km)

Pole position
Driver	Gio Ruggiero	Venturini Motorsports
- Time: 23.232

Most laps led
Driver	Connor Zilisch	Pinnacle Racing Group
- Laps: 102

Winner
No. 28	Connor Zilisch	Pinnacle Racing Group

Television in the United States
- Network: FS1
- Announcers: Eric Brennan and Phil Parsons

Radio in the United States
- Radio: MRN

The 2024 Atlas 150 was the 7th stock car race of the 2024 ARCA Menards Series season, the 5th race of the 2024 ARCA Menards Series East season, and the 18th running of the event. The race was held on Friday, June 14, 2024, at Iowa Speedway in Newton, Iowa, a 0.875 mile (1.408 km) permanent asphalt tri-oval shaped speedway. The race took the scheduled 150 laps to complete. Connor Zilisch, driving for Pinnacle Racing Group, would win his 2nd ARCA Menards Series race and 3rd ARCA Menards Series East of the season.

== Report ==
=== Background ===
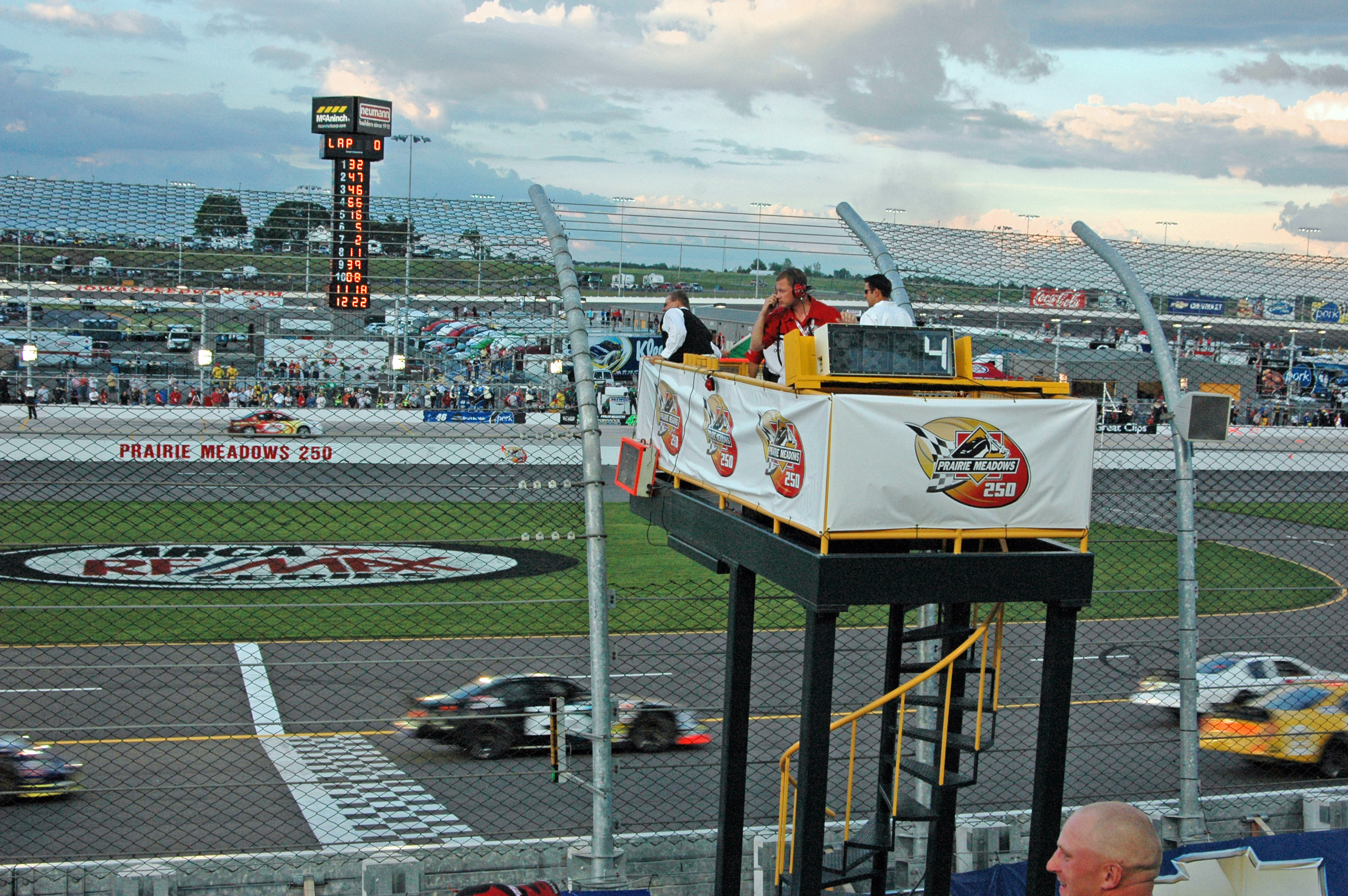
Flagstand of Iowa Speedway in June 2007, the circuit where the race was held.

Iowa Speedway is a 7/8-mile (1.4 km) paved oval motor racing track in Newton, Iowa, United States, approximately 30 miles (48 km) east of Des Moines. The track was designed with influence from Rusty Wallace and patterned after Richmond Raceway, a short track where Wallace was very successful. It has over 25,000 permanent seats as well as a unique multi-tiered Recreational Vehicle viewing area along the backstretch.

==== Entry list ====
- (R) denotes rookie driver.

#	Driver	Team	Make	Sponsor
2	Andrés Pérez de Lara	Rev Racing	Chevrolet	Max Siegel Inc.
03	Alex Clubb	Clubb Racing Inc.	Ford	Race Parts Liquidators
06	Kevin Hinckle	Wayne Peterson Racing	Toyota	KH Automotive
6	Lavar Scott (R)	Rev Racing	Chevrolet	Max Siegel Inc.
10	Christopher Tate	Fast Track Racing	Toyota	T-Top Manufacturing
11	Zachary Tinkle	Fast Track Racing	Toyota	Racing for Rescues
12	Ryan Roulette	Fast Track Racing	Ford	Bellator Recruiting Academy / VFW
15	Kris Wright	Venturini Motorsports	Toyota	FNB Corporation
17	Marco Andretti	Cook Racing Technologies	Chevrolet	Group 1001
18	William Sawalich	Joe Gibbs Racing	Toyota	Starkey / SoundGear
20	Gio Ruggiero (R)	Venturini Motorsports	Toyota	JBL
22	Amber Balcaen	Venturini Motorsports	Toyota	ICON Direct
23	Mason Mitchell	Sigma Performance Services	Chevrolet	Karl Chevrolet / B-Bop's / SPS
25	Toni Breidinger	Venturini Motorsports	Toyota	Ruedebusch Development
28	Connor Zilisch (R)	Pinnacle Racing Group	Chevrolet	Chevrolet Performance
31	Rita Goulet	Rise Motorsports	Chevrolet	NationalPolice.org
32	Christian Rose	AM Racing	Ford	West Virginia Department of Tourism
35	Greg Van Alst	Greg Van Alst Motorsports	Ford	CB Fabricating / Top Choice Fence
39	D. L. Wilson	CW Motorsports	Toyota	ETR / Heart O' Texas Speedway
48	Brad Smith	Brad Smith Motorsports	Ford	Copraya.com
55	Gus Dean	Venturini Motorsports	Toyota	VMS
73	Andy Jankowiak	KLAS Motorsports	Toyota	Acacia Energy
86	Presley Sorah	Clubb Racing Inc.	Ford	Race Parts Liquidators
93	Cody Dennison (R)	CW Motorsports	Chevrolet	Timcast
98	Dale Shearer	Shearer Speed Racing	Toyota	Shearer Speed Racing
99	Michael Maples (R)	Fast Track Racing	Chevrolet	Don Ray Petroleum LLC
Official entry list

== Practice ==
The first and only practice session was held on Friday, June 14, at 2:00 PM CST, and lasted for 45 minutes. Gio Ruggiero, driving for Venturini Motorsports, would set the fastest time in the session, with a lap of 23.104, and a speed of 136.340 mph (219.418 km/h).

Pos.	#	Driver	Team	Make	Time	Speed
1	20	Gio Ruggiero (R)	Venturini Motorsports	Toyota	23.104	136.340
2	28	Connor Zilisch (R)	Pinnacle Racing Group	Chevrolet	23.183	135.875
3	55	Gus Dean	Venturini Motorsports	Toyota	23.390	134.673
Full practice results

== Qualifying ==
Qualifying was held on Friday, June 14, at 3:00 PM CST. The qualifying system used is a multi-car, multi-lap based system. All drivers will be on track for a 20-minute timed session, and whoever sets the fastest time in that session will win the pole.

Gio Ruggiero, driving for Venturini Motorsports, would score the pole for the race, with a lap of 23.232, and a speed of 135.589 mph (218.209 km/h).

=== Qualifying results ===
Pos.	#	Driver	Team	Make	Time	Speed
1	20	Gio Ruggiero (R)	Venturini Motorsports	Toyota	23.232	135.589
2	28	Connor Zilisch (R)	Pinnacle Racing Group	Chevrolet	23.301	135.187
3	55	Gus Dean	Venturini Motorsports	Toyota	23.437	134.403
4	18	William Sawalich	Joe Gibbs Racing	Toyota	23.472	134.202
5	15	Kris Wright	Venturini Motorsports	Toyota	23.537	133.832
6	23	Mason Mitchell	Sigma Performance Services	Chevrolet	23.542	133.803
7	2	Andrés Pérez de Lara	Rev Racing	Chevrolet	23.733	132.727
8	25	Toni Breidinger	Venturini Motorsports	Toyota	23.765	132.548
9	73	Andy Jankowiak	KLAS Motorsports	Toyota	23.809	132.303
10	6	Lavar Scott (R)	Rev Racing	Chevrolet	23.842	132.120
11	35	Greg Van Alst	Greg Van Alst Motorsports	Ford	23.959	131.475
12	22	Amber Balcaen	Venturini Motorsports	Toyota	24.132	130.532
13	32	Christian Rose	AM Racing	Ford	24.358	129.321
14	17	Marco Andretti	Cook Racing Technologies	Chevrolet	24.559	128.263
15	11	Zachary Tinkle	Fast Track Racing	Toyota	24.793	127.052
16	93	Cody Dennison (R)	CW Motorsports	Chevrolet	25.318	124.417
17	12	Ryan Roulette	Fast Track Racing	Ford	25.646	122.826
18	39	D. L. Wilson	CW Motorsports	Toyota	25.663	122.745
19	10	Christopher Tate	Fast Track Racing	Toyota	25.706	122.539
20	99	Michael Maples (R)	Fast Track Racing	Chevrolet	26.544	118.671
21	03	Alex Clubb	Clubb Racing Inc.	Ford	26.553	118.631
22	06	Kevin Hinckle	Wayne Peterson Racing	Toyota	27.607	114.101
23	98	Dale Shearer	Shearer Speed Racing	Toyota	27.731	113.591
24	48	Brad Smith	Brad Smith Motorsports	Ford	28.106	112.076
25	31	Rita Goulet	Rise Motorsports	Chevrolet	–	–
26	86	Presley Sorah	Clubb Racing Inc.	Ford	–	–
Official qualifying results

== Race results ==
Fin	St	#	Driver	Team	Make	Laps	Led	Status	Pts
1	2	28	Connor Zilisch (R)	Pinnacle Racing Group	Chevrolet	150	102	Running	48
2	4	18	William Sawalich	Joe Gibbs Racing	Toyota	150	48	Running	43
3	1	20	Gio Ruggiero	Venturini Motorsports	Toyota	150	0	Running	42
4	6	23	Mason Mitchell	Sigma Performance Services	Chevrolet	150	0	Running	40
5	9	73	Andy Jankowiak	KLAS Motorsports	Toyota	150	0	Running	39
6	7	2	Andrés Pérez de Lara	Rev Racing	Chevrolet	150	0	Running	38
7	3	55	Gus Dean	Venturini Motorsports	Toyota	150	0	Running	37
8	8	25	Toni Breidinger	Venturini Motorsports	Toyota	150	0	Running	36
9	10	6	Lavar Scott	Rev Racing	Chevrolet	150	0	Running	35
10	19	10	Christopher Tate	Fast Track Racing	Toyota	150	0	Running	34
11	13	32	Christian Rose	AM Racing	Ford	150	0	Running	33
12	18	39	D.L. Wilson	CW Motorsports	Toyota	150	0	Running	32
13	20	99	Michael Maples	Fast Track Racing	Chevrolet	147	0	Running	31
14	14	03	Alex Clubb	Clubb Racing Inc.	Ford	140	0	Running	30
15	17	12	Ryan Roulette	Fast Track Racing	Ford	132	0	Running	29
16	5	15	Kris Wright	Venturini Motorsports	Toyota	121	0	Accident	28
17	22	06	Kevin Hinckle	Wayne Peterson Racing	Toyota	118	0	Handling	27
18	16	93	Cody Dennison	CW Motorsports	Chevrolet	117	0	Accident	26
19	23	98	Dale Shearer	Shearer Speed Racing	Toyota	72	0	Handling	25
20	15	11	Zachary Tinkle	Fast Track Racing	Toyota	71	0	Throttle Linkage	24
21	25	31	Rita Goulet	Rise Motorsports	Chevrolet	67	0	Sway Bar	23
22	14	17	Marco Andretti	Cook Racing Technologies	Chevrolet	24	0	Accident	22
23	11	35	Greg Van Alst	Greg Van Alst Motorsports	Ford	23	0	Accident	21
24	12	22	Amber Balcaen	Venturini Motorsports	Toyota	23	0	Accident	20
25	26	86	Presley Sorah	Clubb Racing Inc.	Ford	6	0	Engine	19
26	24	48	Brad Smith	Brad Smith Motorsports	Ford	1	0	Engine	18
Official race results

Previous race: 2024 General Tire 150 (Charlotte)	ARCA Menards Series; 2024 season	Next race: 2024 Zinsser SmartCoat 150

Previous race: 2024 Dutch Boy 150	ARCA Menards Series East; 2024 season	Next race: 2024 Circle City 200
