= 2024 Reese's 150 =

19th race of the 2024 ARCA Menards Series

Race details
- Race 19 of 20 of the 2024 ARCA Menards Series
- Date: September 27, 2024
- Official name: 24th Annual Reese's 150
- Location: Kansas Speedway in Kansas City, Kansas
- Course: Permanent racing facility
- Course length: 1.5 miles (2.4 km)
- Distance: 100 laps, 150 mi (241 km)
- Scheduled distance: 100 laps, 150 mi (241 km)
- Average speed: 109.578 mph (176.349 km/h)

Pole position
Driver	Isabella Robusto	Venturini Motorsports
- Time: 30.896

Most laps led
Driver	Tanner Gray	Joe Gibbs Racing
- Laps: 88

Winner
No. 18	Tanner Gray	Joe Gibbs Racing

Television in the United States
- Network: FS1
- Announcers: Jamie Little and Phil Parsons

Radio in the United States
- Radio: MRN

The 2024 Reese's 150 was the 19th stock car race of the 2024 ARCA Menards Series season, and the 24th iteration of the event. The race was held on Friday, September 27, 2024, at Kansas Speedway in Kansas City, Kansas, a 1.5 mile (2.4 km) permanent tri-oval shaped racetrack. The race took the scheduled 100 laps to complete. In a wild and wreck-filled race, Tanner Gray, driving for Joe Gibbs Racing, would survive a chaotic restart with three laps to go, and held on to the lead with a near flat tire to earn his second career ARCA Menards Series win, and his second of the season. Gray had also dominated the race, leading a race-high 88 laps. To fill out the podium, Connor Zilisch, driving for Pinnacle Racing Group, and Lavar Scott, driving for Rev Racing, would finish 2nd and 3rd, respectively.

== Report ==
=== Background ===
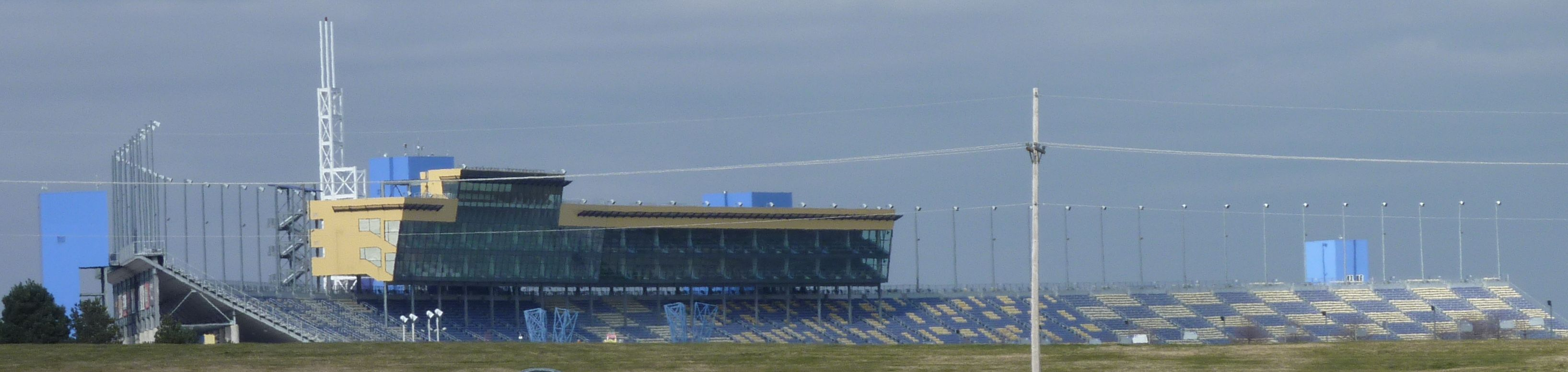
Kansas Speedway, the track where the race will be held.

Kansas Speedway is a 1.5-mile (2.4 km) tri-oval race track in Kansas City, Kansas. It was built in 2001 and it currently hosts two annual NASCAR race weekends. The IndyCar Series also raced here until 2011. The speedway is owned and operated by the International Speedway Corporation.

==== Entry list ====
- (R) denotes rookie driver.

#	Driver	Team	Make	Sponsor
2	Andrés Pérez de Lara	Rev Racing	Chevrolet	MSI Youth Foundation
03	Alex Clubb	Clubb Racing Inc.	Ford	Race Parts Liquidators
06	Kevin Hinckle	Wayne Peterson Racing	Ford	KH Automotive
6	Lavar Scott (R)	Rev Racing	Chevrolet	Max Siegel Inc.
7	Eric Caudell	CCM Racing	Chevrolet	Coble Enterprises / Doug Design
9	Sebastian Arias	Rev Racing	Chevrolet	Betco / Brady PLUS
10	Christopher Tate	Fast Track Racing	Toyota	T-Top Manufacturing
11	Cody Dennison (R)	Fast Track Racing	Toyota	Timcast
12	Takuma Koga	Fast Track Racing	Toyota	IKEDO Archetype
15	Kris Wright	Venturini Motorsports	Toyota	Warranty Solutions
17	Marco Andretti	Cook Racing Technologies	Chevrolet	Group 1001
18	Tanner Gray	Joe Gibbs Racing	Toyota	Place of Hope
20	Gio Ruggiero	Venturini Motorsports	Toyota	First Auto Group
22	Amber Balcaen	Venturini Motorsports	Toyota	ICON Direct
25	Toni Breidinger	Venturini Motorsports	Toyota	Boozy Jerky
28	Connor Zilisch	Pinnacle Racing Group	Chevrolet	Chevrolet / Silver Hare Development
31	Rita Goulet	Rise Motorsports	Chevrolet	NationalPolice.org
32	Christian Rose	AM Racing	Ford	West Virginia Department of Tourism
33	Lawless Alan	Reaume Brothers Racing	Ford	AutoParkIt.com
34	Isaac Johnson	Greg Van Alst Motorsports	Ford	Vector CAG / Endress + Hauser
35	Greg Van Alst	Greg Van Alst Motorsports	Ford	CB Fabricating
48	Brad Smith	Brad Smith Motorsports	Ford	Fallen Outdoors / Ski's Graphics
55	Isabella Robusto	Venturini Motorsports	Toyota	Mobil 1
73	Andy Jankowiak	KLAS Motorsports	Toyota	Acacia Energy / Whelen
74	Mandy Chick	Team Chick Motorsports	Chevrolet	Dynamic Drivelines / FK Rod Ends
82	Corey Day	Pinnacle Racing Group	Chevrolet	HendrickCars.com
97	Jason Kitzmiller	CR7 Motorsports	Chevrolet	A. L. L. Construction
99	Michael Maples (R)	Fast Track Racing	Chevrolet	Don Ray Petroleum LLC
Official entry list

== Practice ==
The first and only practice session was held on Friday, September 27, at 12:10 PM CST, and would last for 45 minutes. Connor Zilisch, driving for Pinnacle Racing Group, would set the fastest time in the session, with a lap of 31.000, and a speed of 174.194 mph (280.338 km/h).

Pos.	#	Driver	Team	Make	Time	Speed
1	28	Connor Zilisch	Pinnacle Racing Group	Chevrolet	31.000	174.194
2	18	Tanner Gray	Joe Gibbs Racing	Toyota	31.030	174.025
3	2	Andrés Pérez de Lara	Rev Racing	Chevrolet	31.189	173.138
Full practice results

== Qualifying ==
Qualifying was held on Friday, September 27, at 1:10 PM CST. The qualifying system used is a multi-car, multi-lap based system. All drivers will be on track for a 20-minute timed session, and whoever sets the fastest time in that session will win the pole.

Isabella Robusto, driving for Venturini Motorsports, would score the pole for the race, with a lap of 30.896, and a speed of 174.780 mph (281.281 km/h).

=== Qualifying results ===
Pos.	#	Driver	Team	Make	Time	Speed
1	55	Isabella Robusto	Venturini Motorsports	Toyota	30.896	174.780
2	20	Gio Ruggiero	Venturini Motorsports	Toyota	30.956	174.441
3	15	Kris Wright	Venturini Motorsports	Toyota	30.985	174.278
4	28	Connor Zilisch	Pinnacle Racing Group	Chevrolet	30.986	174.272
5	18	Tanner Gray	Joe Gibbs Racing	Toyota	31.075	173.773
6	73	Andy Jankowiak	KLAS Motorsports	Toyota	31.193	173.116
7	2	Andrés Pérez de Lara	Rev Racing	Chevrolet	31.196	173.099
8	6	Lavar Scott (R)	Rev Racing	Chevrolet	31.227	172.927
9	82	Corey Day	Pinnacle Racing Group	Chevrolet	31.292	172.568
10	22	Amber Balcaen	Venturini Motorsports	Toyota	31.384	172.062
11	33	Lawless Alan	Reaume Brothers Racing	Ford	31.391	172.024
12	25	Toni Breidinger	Venturini Motorsports	Toyota	31.396	171.996
13	34	Isaac Johnson	Greg Van Alst Motorsports	Ford	31.622	170.767
14	35	Greg Van Alst	Greg Van Alst Motorsports	Ford	31.622	170.767
15	32	Christian Rose	AM Racing	Ford	31.684	170.433
16	97	Jason Kitzmiller	CR7 Motorsports	Chevrolet	32.088	168.287
17	10	Christopher Tate	Fast Track Racing	Toyota	32.249	167.447
18	17	Marco Andretti	Cook Racing Technologies	Chevrolet	32.288	167.245
19	74	Mandy Chick	Team Chick Motorsports	Chevrolet	32.614	165.573
20	9	Sebastian Arias	Rev Racing	Chevrolet	33.064	163.320
21	12	Takuma Koga	Fast Track Racing	Toyota	33.703	160.223
22	11	Cody Dennison (R)	Fast Track Racing	Toyota	33.785	159.834
23	7	Eric Caudell	CCM Racing	Chevrolet	34.457	156.717
24	99	Michael Maples (R)	Fast Track Racing	Chevrolet	34.792	155.208
25	31	Rita Goulet	Rise Motorsports	Chevrolet	35.420	152.456
26	06	Kevin Hinckle	Wayne Peterson Racing	Ford	35.842	150.661
27	48	Brad Smith	Brad Smith Motorsports	Ford	36.390	148.392
28	03	Alex Clubb	Clubb Racing Inc.	Ford	38.629	139.791
Official qualifying results

== Race results ==
Fin	St	#	Driver	Team	Make	Laps	Led	Status	Pts
1	5	18	Tanner Gray	Joe Gibbs Racing	Toyota	100	88	Running	48
2	4	28	Connor Zilisch	Pinnacle Racing Group	Chevrolet	100	0	Running	42
3	8	6	Lavar Scott (R)	Rev Racing	Chevrolet	100	0	Running	41
4	9	82	Corey Day	Pinnacle Racing Group	Chevrolet	100	0	Running	40
5	2	20	Gio Ruggiero	Venturini Motorsports	Toyota	100	9	Running	40
6	10	22	Amber Balcaen	Venturini Motorsports	Toyota	100	3	Running	39
7	6	73	Andy Jankowiak	KLAS Motorsports	Toyota	100	0	Running	37
8	11	33	Lawless Alan	Reaume Brothers Racing	Ford	99	0	Running	36
9	14	34	Isaac Johnson	Greg Van Alst Motorsports	Ford	98	0	Running	35
10	16	97	Jason Kitzmiller	CR7 Motorsports	Chevrolet	98	0	Running	34
11	19	74	Mandy Chick	Team Chick Motorsports	Chevrolet	98	0	Running	33
12	12	25	Toni Breidinger	Venturini Motorsports	Toyota	98	0	Running	32
13	15	32	Christian Rose	AM Racing	Ford	96	0	Running	31
14	23	7	Eric Caudell	CCM Racing	Chevrolet	96	0	Running	30
15	21	12	Takuma Koga	Fast Track Racing	Toyota	95	0	Running	29
16	24	99	Michael Maples (R)	Fast Track Racing	Chevrolet	95	0	Running	28
17	20	9	Sebastian Arias	Rev Racing	Chevrolet	93	0	Running	27
18	3	15	Kris Wright	Venturini Motorsports	Toyota	90	0	Accident	26
19	25	31	Rita Goulet	Rise Motorsports	Chevrolet	64	0	Oil Leak	25
20	13	35	Greg Van Alst	Greg Van Alst Motorsports	Ford	62	0	Mechanical	24
21	7	2	Andrés Pérez de Lara	Rev Racing	Chevrolet	47	0	Accident	23
22	22	11	Cody Dennison (R)	Fast Track Racing	Toyota	25	0	Engine	22
23	18	17	Marco Andretti	Cook Racing Technologies	Chevrolet	23	0	Brakes	21
24	17	10	Christopher Tate	Fast Track Racing	Toyota	20	0	Engine	20
25	27	48	Brad Smith	Brad Smith Motorsports	Ford	12	0	Overheating	19
26	26	06	Kevin Hinckle	Wayne Peterson Racing	Ford	10	0	Engine	18
27	28	03	Alex Clubb	Clubb Racing Inc.	Ford	9	0	Handling	17
28	1	55	Isabella Robusto	Venturini Motorsports	Toyota	1	0	Accident	17
Official race results

== Standings after the race ==
Drivers' Championship standings

Pos	Driver	Points
1	Andrés Pérez de Lara	867
2	Lavar Scott	833 (-34)
3	Kris Wright	787 (–80)
4	Toni Breidinger	750 (–117)
5	Christian Rose	747 (–120)
6	Amber Balcaen	705 (–162)
7	Cody Dennison	654 (–213)
8	Michael Maples	654 (–213)
9	Alex Clubb	627 (–240)
10	William Sawalich	592 (–275)

- Note: Only the first 10 positions are included for the driver standings.

Previous race: 2024 Bush's Beans 200	ARCA Menards Series; 2024 season	Next race: 2024 Owens Corning 200
