= Christopher Tate (racing driver) =

American racing driver (born 1999)

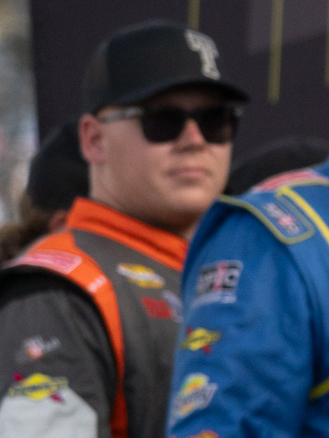
- Tate at Iowa Speedway in 2024
- Born: September 8, 1999 (age 27); Chico, Texas, U.S.

ARCA Menards Series career
- 2 races run over 1 year
- Best finish: 66th (2024)
- First race: 2024 Atlas 150 (Iowa)
- Last race: 2024 Reese's 150 (Kansas)
Wins	Top tens	Poles
0	1	0

ARCA Menards Series East career
- 1 race run over 1 year
- Best finish: 47th (2024)
- First race: 2024 Atlas 150 (Iowa)
Wins	Top tens	Poles
0	1	0
- Statistics up to date as of October 22, 2024.

Christopher Tate (born September 8, 1999) is an American professional stock car racing driver who last competed part-time in the ARCA Menards Series and ARCA Menards Series East, driving the No. 10 Chevrolet for Fast Track Racing. He is also a former development driver for 3F Racing.

== Racing career ==
On August 4, 2022, it was announced that Tate would join the newly formed 3F Racing as a development driver. Alongside this, he was scheduled to drive select races with the team in the ARCA Menards Series and the NASCAR Craftsman Truck Series for the following year. His first start with the team came at the All-Pro Limited Late Model Series race at Florence Motor Speedway, where he finished in sixteenth place.

In 2023, Tate participated in the pre-season test for the ARCA Menards Series at Daytona International Speedway, driving for Fast Track Racing, where he placed twelfth in the overall results between the two days after placing eighth in the Friday session. Although he was announced to drive in the ARCA and Truck Series for 3F Racing, and already acquired a sponsor for his races, he ultimately did not run in either series that year.

On May 6, 2024, it was announced that Tate would make his ARCA debut at Charlotte Motor Speedway, driving the No. 01 Chevrolet for Fast Track Racing, although one day after the announcement, it was revealed that he would not be running with the team at Charlotte, although Tate stated he was still looking to make his debut with the team. A couple of weeks later, it was announced that Tate would officially make his debut with Fast Track at Iowa Speedway, this time driving the No. 10 Chevrolet where he would finish tenth. A few months later, it was then announced that Tate would compete at Kansas Speedway with Fast Track Racing. He would ultimately end up having mechanical issues leading to a DNF for the event.

== Personal life ==
Tate is now out of the United States Marine Corps looking to pursue racing full time.

== Motorsports results ==
=== ARCA Menards Series ===
(key) (Bold – Pole position awarded by qualifying time. Italics – Pole position earned by points standings or practice time. * – Most laps led.)

ARCA Menards Series results
Year	Team	No.	Make	1	2	3	4	5	6	7	8	9	10	11	12	13	14	15	16	17	18	19	20	AMSC	Pts	Ref
2024	Fast Track Racing	10	Toyota	DAY	PHO	TAL	DOV	KAN	CLT	IOW; 10	MOH	BLN	IRP	SLM	ELK	MCH	ISF	MLW	DSF	GLN	BRI	KAN; 24	TOL	66th	54	

==== ARCA Menards Series East ====
ARCA Menards Series East results
Year	Team	No.	Make	1	2	3	4	5	6	7	8	AMSEC	Pts	Ref
2024	Fast Track Racing	10	Toyota	FIF	DOV	NSV	FRS	IOW; 10	IRP	MLW	BRI	47th	34	
