= Jeffery MacZink =

American racing driver

- Born: November 23, 1977 (age 48); Rockwood, Michigan, U.S.

ARCA Menards Series career
- 14 races run over 13 years
- Best finish: 60th (2022)
- First race: 2009 Menards 200 (Toledo)
- Last race: 2026 Henry Ford Health 200 (Michigan)
Wins	Top tens	Poles
0	1	0

ARCA Menards Series East career
- 4 races run over 4 years
- Best finish: 36th (2023)
- First race: 2023 Dutch Boy 150 (Flat Rock)
- Last race: 2026 Sunbelt Rentals 150 (Flat Rock)
Wins	Top tens	Poles
0	1	0
- Statistics up to date as of August 1, 2026.

Jeffery MacZink (born November 23, 1977) is an American professional stock car racing driver. He last competed part-time in both the ARCA Menards Series and ARCA Menards Series East, driving the No. 65 Toyota for MacZink Racing.

== Racing career ==
From 2003 to 2004, MacZink would run select starts in the ARCA Late Model Cup Series, where he would get a best finish of 11th in the third race of the latter year at Toledo Speedway.

In 2005, MacZink attempted to make his ARCA Re/Max Series debut at Toledo driving the No. 6 Chevrolet driving for his own team, where he would ultimately fail to qualify. He would return to the series three years later in 2009, where he would make both the events at Toledo, this time in the No. 45 Chevrolet, finishing twelve laps down in 24th in the first race, and 27th in the second race due to rear end issues. He would only run the September Toledo race in 2010, where he would finishing 24th due to a crash.

After not competing in the series from 2011 to 2012, MacZink would return to ARCA in 2013 at Michigan International Speedway in the No. 65 Chevrolet for his own team, where he would finish 26th after four laps due to engine issues. In 2014, he would be entered in the race at Berlin Raceway driving the No. 66 Toyota for Venturini Motorsports, where he would start 22nd and finish 25th after one lap due to rear end issues. He would withdraw from Michigan in 2015 as well as the season opening race at Daytona International Speedway in 2016 before making his next starts at Toledo and Michigan, finishing 26th at Toledo and 28th at Michigan, both due to engine issues. Afterwards, he would withdraw from Michigan again in 2017.

In 2021, MacZink made his return to the series at Michigan in 2021, this time in a Toyota, where he would get his first top-ten finish with a ninth-place finish after starting last due to there being no qualifying. For the following the year, he would once again run at Michigan and Toledo, finishing five laps down in fourteenth at Michigan and finish nineteenth at Toledo due to a crash.

In 2023, it was revealed that MacZink would make his ARCA Menards Series East debut at Flat Rock Speedway in the No. 65 Toyota. He would start eighth and finish ninth in the race.

== Motorsports results ==
=== ARCA Menards Series ===
(key) (Bold – Pole position awarded by qualifying time. Italics – Pole position earned by points standings or practice time. * – Most laps led.)

ARCA Menards Series results
Year	Team	No.	Make	1	2	3	4	5	6	7	8	9	10	11	12	13	14	15	16	17	18	19	20	21	22	23	AMSC	Pts	Ref
2005	MacZink Racing	6	Chevy	DAY	NSH	SLM	KEN	TOL	LAN	MIL	POC	MCH	KAN	KEN	BLN	POC	GTW	LER	NSH	MCH	ISF	TOL; DNQ	DSF	CHI	SLM	TAL	N/A	0	
2009	MacZink Racing	45	Chevy	DAY	SLM	CAR	TAL	KEN	TOL; 24	POC	MCH	MFD	IOW	KEN	BLN	POC	ISF	CHI	TOL; 27	DSF	NJE	SLM	KAN	CAR			109th	205	
2010	MacZink Racing	45	Chevy	DAY	PBE	SLM	TEX	TAL	TOL	POC	MCH	IOW	MFD	POC	BLN	NJE	ISF	CHI	DSF	TOL; 24	SLM	KAN	CAR				117th	110	
2013	MacZink Racing	65	Chevy	DAY	MOB	SLM	TAL	TOL	ELK	POC	MCH; 26	ROA	WIN	CHI	NJM	POC	BLN	ISF	MAD	DSF	IOW	SLM	KEN	KAN			134th	100	
2014	Venturini Motorsports	66	Toyota	DAY	MOB	SLM	TAL	TOL	NJE	POC	MCH	ELK	WIN	CHI	IRP	POC	BLN; 25	ISF	MAD	DSF	SLM	KEN	KAN				126th	105	
2015	MacZink Racing	65	Chevy	DAY	MOB	NSH	SLM	TAL	TOL	NJE	POC	MCH; Wth	CHI	WIN	IOW	IRP	POC	BLN	ISF	DSF	SLM	KEN	KAN				N/A	0	
2016	MacZink Racing	65	Chevy	DAY; Wth	NSH	SLM	TAL	TOL; 26	NJE	POC	MCH; 28	MAD	WIN	IOW	IRP	POC	BLN	ISF	DSF	SLM	CHI	KEN	KAN				96th	190	
2017	MacZink Racing	65	Chevy	DAY	NSH	SLM	TAL	TOL	ELK	POC	MCH; Wth	MAD	IOW	IRP	POC	WIN	ISF	ROA	DSF	SLM	CHI	KEN	KAN				N/A	0	
2021	MacZink Racing	65	Toyota	DAY	PHO	TAL	KAN	TOL	CLT	MOH	POC	ELK	BLN	IOW	WIN	GLN	MCH; 9	ISF	MLW	DSF	BRI	SLM	KAN				83rd	35	
2022	MacZink Racing	65	Toyota	DAY	PHO	TAL	KAN	CLT	IOW	BLN	ELK	MOH	POC	IRP	MCH; 14	GLN	ISF	MLW	DSF	KAN	BRI	SLM	TOL; 19				60th	55	
2023	MacZink Racing	65	Toyota	DAY	PHO	TAL	KAN	CLT	BLN	ELK	MOH	IOW	POC	MCH; 14	IRP	GLN	ISF	MLW	DSF	KAN	BRI	SLM	TOL				95th	30	
2024	MacZink Racing	65	Toyota	DAY	PHO	TAL	DOV	KAN	CLT	IOW	MOH	BLN	IRP	SLM	ELK	MCH; 17	ISF	MLW	DSF	GLN	BRI	KAN	TOL				93rd	27	
2025	MacZink Racing	65	Toyota	DAY	PHO	TAL	KAN	CLT	MCH; 24	BLN	ELK	LRP	DOV	IRP	IOW	GLN	ISF	MAD	DSF	BRI	SLM	KAN	TOL				129th	20	
2026	MacZink Racing	65	Toyota	DAY	PHO	KAN	TAL	GLN	TOL	MCH; 17	POC	BER	ELK	CHI	LRP	IRP	IOW	ISF	MAD	DSF	SLM	BRI	KAN				110th	27	

==== ARCA Menards Series East ====
ARCA Menards Series East results
Year	Team	No.	Make	1	2	3	4	5	6	7	8	AMSEC	Pts	Ref
2023	MacZink Racing	65	Toyota	FIF	DOV	NSV	FRS; 9	IOW	IRP	MLW	BRI	36th	35	
2024	MacZink Racing	65	Toyota	FIF	DOV	NSV	FRS; 13	IOW	IRP	MLW	BRI	50th	31	
2025	MacZink Racing	65	Toyota	FIF	CAR	NSV	FRS; 13	DOV	IRP	IOW	BRI	57th	31	
2026	MacZink Racing	65	Toyota	HCY	CAR	NSV	TOL	IRP	FRS; 12	IOW	BRI	56th	32	
