= 2024 ARCA Menards Series East =

38th season of the ARCA Menards Series East

The 2024 ARCA Menards Series East was the 38th season of the ARCA Menards Series East, a regional stock car racing series sanctioned by NASCAR in the United States. The season began on March 23 with the Pensacola 150 at Five Flags Speedway and ended on September 19 with the Bush's Beans 200 at Bristol Motor Speedway.

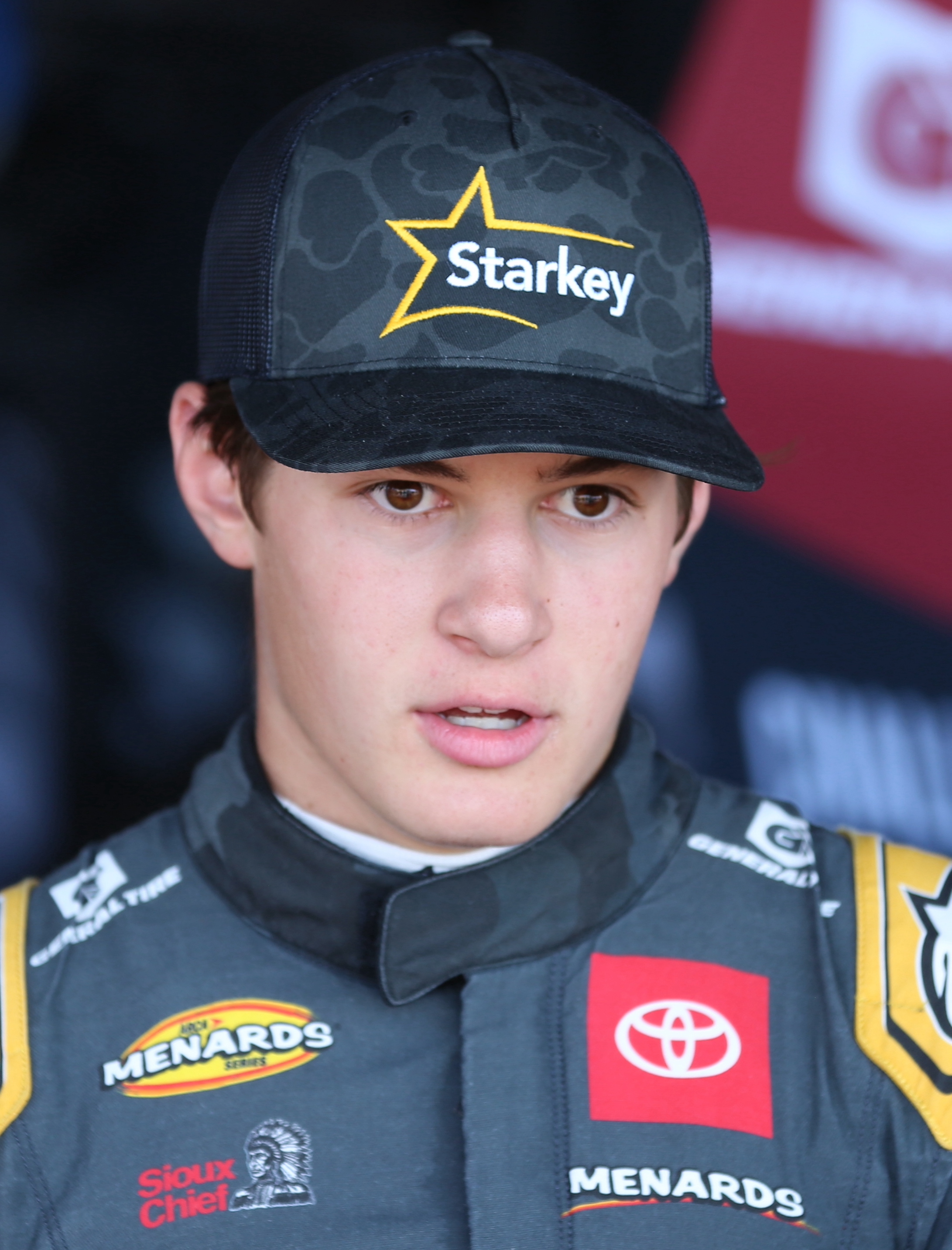
William Sawalich, the 2024 ARCA Menards Series East champion.

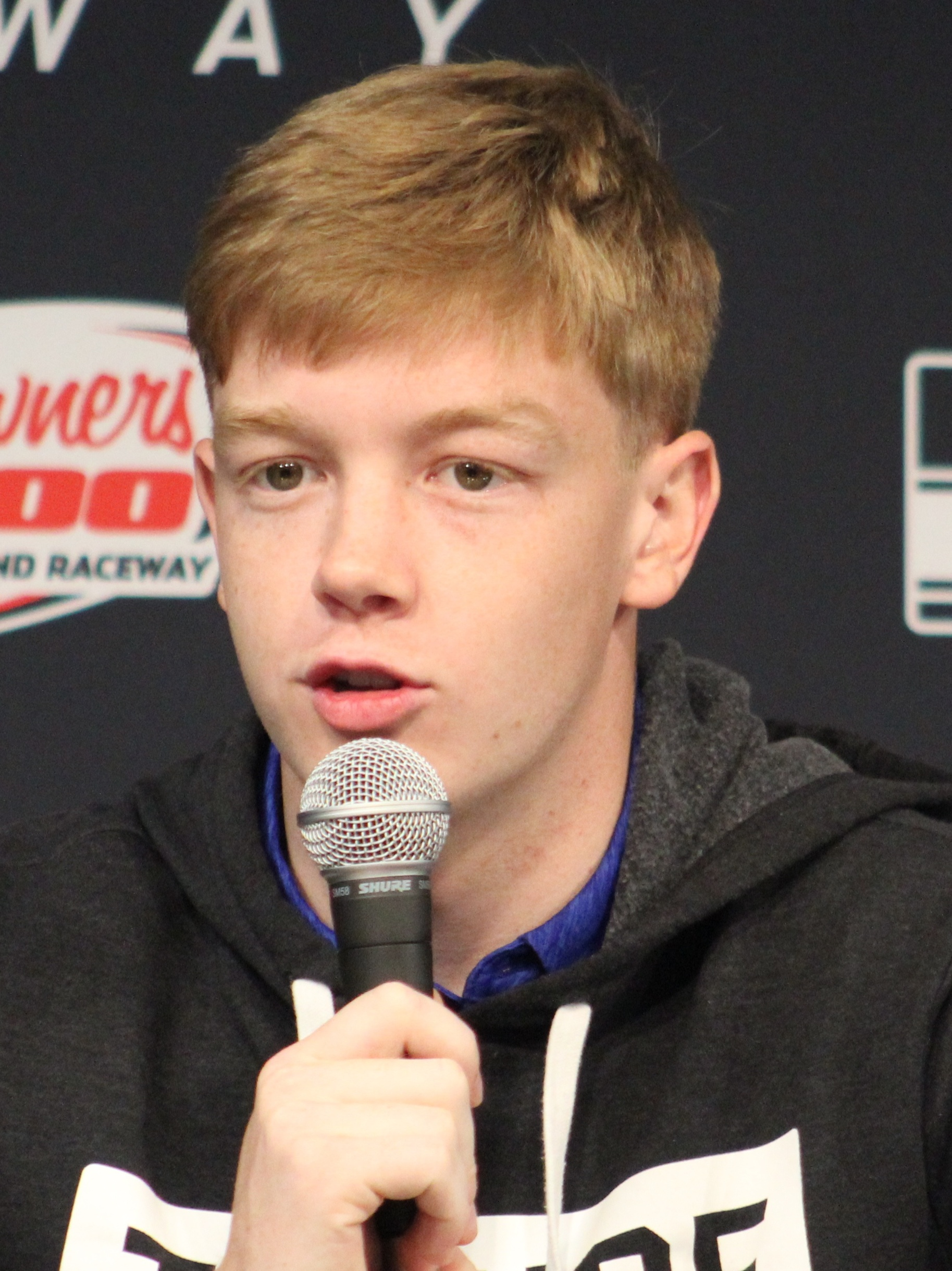
Connor Zilisch finished second in the championship by twelve points.

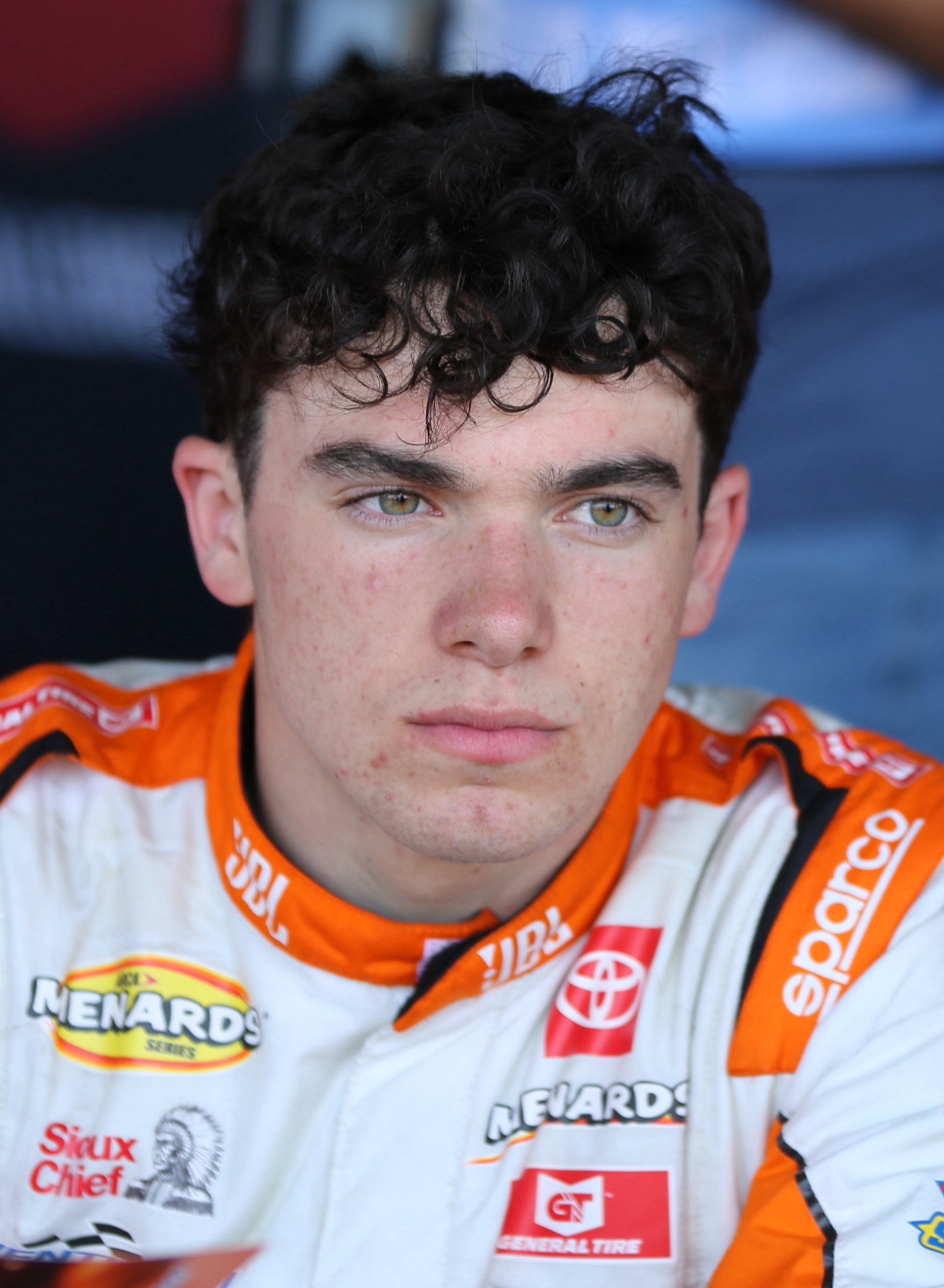
Gio Ruggiero finished third in the championship by 50 points.

At the conclusion of the season, William Sawalich of Joe Gibbs Racing claimed his second consecutive championship.

== Teams and drivers ==
Note: If a driver is listed as their own crew chief for a particular race, that means that their entry in that race was a start and park.

=== Complete schedule ===
Manufacturer	Team	No.	Driver	Crew chief
Chevrolet	Fast Track Racing	99	Michael Maples (R)	Mike Sroufe
Chevrolet	Pinnacle Racing Group	28	Connor Zilisch (R)	Shane Huffman
Chevrolet	Rise Motorsports	31	Rita Goulet 7	Tim Goulet 5 Nikolas Smith 1 Matthew Wright 2
Chevrolet	Rise Motorsports	31	Tim Goulet 1	Tim Goulet 5 Nikolas Smith 1 Matthew Wright 2
Ford	Brad Smith Motorsports	48	Brad Smith	Carlos Leon 1 Terry Strange 2 Carl Brown 1 Jeff Smith 4
Toyota	CW Motorsports	39	D. L. Wilson	Darrell Phillips 1 Riley Higgins 6 Tony Cosentino 1
Toyota	Fast Track Racing	11	Zachary Tinkle	Todd Parrott
Toyota	Joe Gibbs Racing	18	William Sawalich	Matt Ross
Toyota	Venturini Motorsports	20	Gio Ruggiero (R)	Shannon Rursch 5 Kevin Reed Jr. 3
Toyota	Venturini Motorsports	55	Jake Finch 1	Johnny Allen 1 Kevin Reed Jr. 4 Kevin Eagle 1 Billy Venturini 2
Toyota	Venturini Motorsports	55	Brent Crews 1	Johnny Allen 1 Kevin Reed Jr. 4 Kevin Eagle 1 Billy Venturini 2
Toyota	Venturini Motorsports	55	Isabella Robusto 1	Johnny Allen 1 Kevin Reed Jr. 4 Kevin Eagle 1 Billy Venturini 2
Toyota	Venturini Motorsports	55	Toni Breidinger 1	Johnny Allen 1 Kevin Reed Jr. 4 Kevin Eagle 1 Billy Venturini 2
Toyota	Venturini Motorsports	55	Gus Dean 1	Johnny Allen 1 Kevin Reed Jr. 4 Kevin Eagle 1 Billy Venturini 2
Toyota	Venturini Motorsports	55	Dean Thompson 3	Johnny Allen 1 Kevin Reed Jr. 4 Kevin Eagle 1 Billy Venturini 2
Chevrolet 5 Ford 3	CW Motorsports	93	Colton Collins 2	Brandon Hargrove 3 Colton Collins 2 Caleb Costner 1 Ryan Honeycutt 1 Jeff Phillips 1
Chevrolet 5 Ford 3	CW Motorsports	93	Caleb Costner 2	Brandon Hargrove 3 Colton Collins 2 Caleb Costner 1 Ryan Honeycutt 1 Jeff Phillips 1
Chevrolet 5 Ford 3	CW Motorsports	93	Cody Dennison (R) 1 (Note: Dennison ran the full season split between the Wayne Peterson Racing No. 06 car, the CW Motorsports No. 93 car, and the Fast Track Racing No. 10/01 cars.)	Brandon Hargrove 3 Colton Collins 2 Caleb Costner 1 Ryan Honeycutt 1 Jeff Phillips 1
Chevrolet 5 Ford 3	CW Motorsports	93	Tyler Tomassi 2	Brandon Hargrove 3 Colton Collins 2 Caleb Costner 1 Ryan Honeycutt 1 Jeff Phillips 1
Chevrolet 5 Ford 3	CW Motorsports	93	Brian Clubb 1	Brandon Hargrove 3 Colton Collins 2 Caleb Costner 1 Ryan Honeycutt 1 Jeff Phillips 1
Ford 2 Toyota 4	Fast Track Racing	10	Mike Basham 1	Nathan Davis 1 Dick Doheny 1 Chris Vanscoy 6
Ford 2 Toyota 4	Fast Track Racing	10	Ed Pompa 1	Nathan Davis 1 Dick Doheny 1 Chris Vanscoy 6
Ford 2 Toyota 4	Fast Track Racing	10	Jayson Alexander 3	Nathan Davis 1 Dick Doheny 1 Chris Vanscoy 6
Ford 2 Toyota 4	Fast Track Racing	10	Christopher Tate 1	Nathan Davis 1 Dick Doheny 1 Chris Vanscoy 6
Ford 2 Toyota 4	Fast Track Racing	10	Cody Dennison (R) 2	Nathan Davis 1 Dick Doheny 1 Chris Vanscoy 6
Toyota 4 Ford 2 Chevrolet 1	Fast Track Racing	12	Presley Sorah 3	Chris Vanscoy 2 Nathan Davis 2 Corbin Sklener 1 Jeremy Petty 2 Tim Monroe 1
Toyota 4 Ford 2 Chevrolet 1	Fast Track Racing	12	Mike Basham 1	Chris Vanscoy 2 Nathan Davis 2 Corbin Sklener 1 Jeremy Petty 2 Tim Monroe 1
Toyota 4 Ford 2 Chevrolet 1	Fast Track Racing	12	Matt Kemp 1	Chris Vanscoy 2 Nathan Davis 2 Corbin Sklener 1 Jeremy Petty 2 Tim Monroe 1
Toyota 4 Ford 2 Chevrolet 1	Fast Track Racing	12	Ryan Roulette 2	Chris Vanscoy 2 Nathan Davis 2 Corbin Sklener 1 Jeremy Petty 2 Tim Monroe 1
Toyota 4 Ford 2 Chevrolet 1	Fast Track Racing	12	Eric Caudell 1	Chris Vanscoy 2 Nathan Davis 2 Corbin Sklener 1 Jeremy Petty 2 Tim Monroe 1
Toyota 5 Ford 3	Wayne Peterson Racing	06	Cody Dennison (R) 4	Nate Moeller 4 Michael Peterson 2 Wayne Peterson 2
Toyota 5 Ford 3	Wayne Peterson Racing	06	Kevin Hinckle 1	Nate Moeller 4 Michael Peterson 2 Wayne Peterson 2
Toyota 5 Ford 3	Wayne Peterson Racing	06	Brayton Laster 1	Nate Moeller 4 Michael Peterson 2 Wayne Peterson 2
Toyota 5 Ford 3	Wayne Peterson Racing	06	Nate Moeller 2	Nate Moeller 4 Michael Peterson 2 Wayne Peterson 2

=== Limited schedule ===
Manufacturer	Team	No.	Driver	Crew chief	Races
Chevrolet	Cook Racing Technologies	17	Marco Andretti	Sean Samuels	5
Chevrolet	Cook Racing Technologies	42	Tanner Reif	Jerry Babb 1 Sean Samuels 1	2
Chevrolet	CR7 Motorsports	97	Landen Lewis	Frank Kimmel	1
Chevrolet	Hettinger Racing	71	Dawson Sutton	Mardy Lindley	1
Chevrolet	Pinnacle Racing Group	82	Carson Kvapil	Michael Shelton 1 Greg Ives 1	1
Chevrolet	Pinnacle Racing Group	82	Corey Day	Michael Shelton 1 Greg Ives 1	1
Chevrolet	Rev Racing	2	Andrés Pérez de Lara	Glenn Parker	5
Chevrolet	Rev Racing	6	Lavar Scott	Danny Johnson	5
Chevrolet	Rev Racing	9	Logan Misuraca	Jay Lupo	1
Chevrolet	Scofield Motorsports	07	Tyler Scofield	Brian Finney	2
Chevrolet	Sigma Performance Services	23	Mason Mitchell	Chris Bray	1
Chevrolet	Sigma Performance Services	23	Tyler Reif	Chris Bray	1
Ford	AM Racing	32	Christian Rose	Ryan London	5
Ford	City Garage Motorsports	85	Becca Monopoli	Tom Monopoli	1
Ford	Clubb Racing Inc.	03	Alex Clubb	Brian Clubb	5
Ford	Clubb Racing Inc.	86	Presley Sorah	Travis McLaughlin 1 Brian Harsein 1 Brian Clubb 1	1
Ford	Clubb Racing Inc.	86	Casey Carden	Travis McLaughlin 1 Brian Harsein 1 Brian Clubb 1	1
Ford	Clubb Racing Inc.	86	Brian Clubb	Travis McLaughlin 1 Brian Harsein 1 Brian Clubb 1	1
Ford	Greg Van Alst Motorsports	34	Isaac Johnson	Kevin Shannon	1
Ford	Greg Van Alst Motorsports	35	Greg Van Alst	Jim Long	4
Ford	Reaume Brothers Racing	33	Lawless Alan	Josh Reaume	3
Toyota	Fast Track Racing	01	Blaine Donahue	Nathan Davis 1 Dick Doheny 1	1
Toyota	Fast Track Racing	01	Cody Dennison (R)	Nathan Davis 1 Dick Doheny 1	1
Toyota	KLAS Motorsports	73	Andy Jankowiak	Mike Dayton	3
Toyota	MacZink Racing	65	Jeffery MacZink	Jarod MacZink	1
Toyota	MAN Motorsports	95	Hunter Wright	Tony Ponkouskas	2
Toyota	MAN Motorsports	95	Andrew Patterson	Tony Ponkouskas	3
Toyota	MAN Motorsports	96	Andrew Patterson	David Noble	1
Toyota	MAN Motorsports	96	Jackson McLerran	David Noble	1
Toyota	Richmond Motorsports	27	Tim Richmond	Adam Murphy	1
Toyota	Shearer Speed Racing	98	Dale Shearer	Ian Egert 2 A. J. Brunson 2 Matt Paulson 1	5
Toyota	Venturini Motorsports	15	Kris Wright	Larry Balsitis	5
Toyota	Venturini Motorsports	22	Amber Balcaen	Dave Fuge 2 Kevin Eagle 1 Jeff Spraker 2	5
Toyota	Venturini Motorsports	25	Toni Breidinger	Cayden Lapcevich	5
Chevrolet 1 Toyota 1	Phoenix Racing	1	Bubba Pollard	Andrew Overstreet 1 Johnny Allen 1	1
Chevrolet 1 Toyota 1	Phoenix Racing	1	Jake Finch	Andrew Overstreet 1 Johnny Allen 1	1
Ford 4 Toyota 1	Wayne Peterson Racing	0	Nate Moeller	Wayne Peterson	5

== Schedule ==
The full schedule was announced on December 6, 2023. Some race dates were announced before then as part of the announcement of the main ARCA Series schedule on November 28.

Note: Races highlighted in gold are combination events with the ARCA Menards Series.

No	Race title	Track	Location	Date
1	Pensacola 150	Five Flags Speedway	Pensacola, Florida	March 23
2	General Tire 150	Dover Motor Speedway	Dover, Delaware	April 26
3	Music City 150	Nashville Fairgrounds Speedway	Nashville, Tennessee	May 11
4	Dutch Boy 150	Flat Rock Speedway	Ash Township, Michigan	May 18
5	Atlas 150	Iowa Speedway	Newton, Iowa	June 14
6	Circle City 200	Lucas Oil Indianapolis Raceway Park	Brownsburg, Indiana	July 19
7	Sprecher 150	Milwaukee Mile	West Allis, Wisconsin	August 25
8	Bush's Beans 200	Bristol Motor Speedway	Bristol, Tennessee	September 19

=== Schedule changes ===
Although the schedule remains at eight races at the exact same tracks in the exact same order as in 2023, there are some minor changes to some races.

- The race at Five Flags Speedway is shortened from 200 miles to 150 miles.
- The race at Dover Motor Speedway becomes a combination race with the main ARCA Series after previously being a standalone race for the East Series.
- The race at Nashville Fairgrounds Speedway is shortened from 200 laps to 150 laps.
- The combination race at Iowa Speedway was moved from July to June in order for it to be on the same weekend as the track's new Cup Series race and its returning Xfinity Series race.
- The combination race at Lucas Oil Indianapolis Raceway Park moves from August to July along with the track's Truck Series race and the Cup and Xfinity Series races at the nearby Indianapolis Motor Speedway.

== Results and standings ==
=== Race results ===
No.	Race	Pole position	Most laps led	Winning driver	Manufacturer	No.	Winning team	Report
1	Pensacola 150	William Sawalich	William Sawalich	Gio Ruggiero	Toyota	20	Venturini Motorsports	Report
2	General Tire 150	William Sawalich	William Sawalich	Connor Zilisch	Chevrolet	28	Pinnacle Racing Group	Report
3	Music City 150	Gio Ruggiero	William Sawalich	William Sawalich	Toyota	18	Joe Gibbs Racing	Report
4	Dutch Boy 150	Connor Zilisch	Connor Zilisch	Connor Zilisch	Chevrolet	28	Pinnacle Racing Group	Report
5	Atlas 150	Gio Ruggiero	Connor Zilisch	Connor Zilisch	Chevrolet	28	Pinnacle Racing Group	Report
6	Circle City 200	William Sawalich	Connor Zilisch	Connor Zilisch	Chevrolet	28	Pinnacle Racing Group	Report
7	Sprecher 150	William Sawalich	William Sawalich	William Sawalich	Toyota	18	Joe Gibbs Racing	Report
8	Bush's Beans 200	Connor Zilisch	William Sawalich	William Sawalich	Toyota	18	Joe Gibbs Racing	Report

=== Drivers' championship ===
Notes:

- The pole winner also receives one bonus point, similar to the previous ARCA points system used until 2019 and unlike NASCAR.
- Additionally, after groups of five races of the season, drivers that compete in all five races receive fifty additional points. This points bonus will be given after the race at Iowa.
  - Connor Zilisch, William Sawalich, Gio Ruggiero, Zachary Tinkle, D. L. Wilson, Cody Dennison, Michael Maples, and Rita Goulet received this points bonus for having competed in the first five races of the season (Five Flags, Dover, Nashville Fairgrounds, Flat Rock, and Iowa).

(key) Bold – Pole position awarded by time. Italics – Pole position set by final practice results or rainout. * – Most laps led.

Pos	Driver	FIF	DOV	NSV	FRS	IOW	IRP	MLW	BRI	Points
1	William Sawalich	**2***	**17***	1*	2	2	**3**	**1***	1*	448
2	Connor Zilisch **(R)**	4	1	3	**1****	1*	1*	2	**26**	436
3	Gio Ruggiero **(R)**	1	2	**14**	3	**3**	5	9	15	402
4	Zachary Tinkle	8	10	4	5	20	11	12	11	371
5	D. L. Wilson	9	11	10	9	12	16	14	23	348
6	Cody Dennison **(R)**	10	12	11	10	18	14	13	17	347
7	Michael Maples **(R)**	12	14	12	12	13	15	18	24	332
8	Lavar Scott		4			9	4	3	3	248
9	Andrés Pérez de Lara		5			6	2	6	4	247
10	Toni Breidinger		15		4	8	24	11	12	240
11	Rita Goulet	13	23	13	14	21	20	23		231
12	Kris Wright		6			16	6	4	13	225
13	Marco Andretti		19			22	7	10	22	190
14	Christian Rose		21			11	22	8	20	188
15	Nate Moeller	16		17	16		28	21	30	186
16	Alex Clubb		18			14	21	19	19	179
17	Andrew Patterson			5			12	16	18	175
18	Brad Smith	Wth	Wth	16	15	26	31	22	32	172
19	Amber Balcaen		20			24	13	20	25	168
20	Greg Van Alst		8			23	8		21	116
21	Dean Thompson						9	7	5	111
22	Andy Jankowiak		7			5			10	110
23	Jayson Alexander			8	8		18			98
24	Lawless Alan						23	5	9	95
25	Presley Sorah	14		18		25	29			90
26	Hunter Wright	5		9						74
27	Jake Finch	7							8	73
28	Caleb Costner		9	7						72
29	Tyler Scofield	15		6						67
30	Colton Collins	11			11					66
31	Mike Basham	6	24							58
32	Tyler Tomassi						17	15		56
33	Ryan Roulette					15		17		56
34	Dale Shearer	Wth	Wth			19	30		29	54
35	Tanner Reif		22	15						51
36	Landen Lewis								2	43
37	Isabella Robusto			2						43
38	Carson Kvapil		3							41
39	Bubba Pollard	3								41
40	Mason Mitchell					4				40
41	Tyler Reif								6	38
42	Matt Kemp				6					38
43	Corey Day								7	37
44	Gus Dean					7				37
45	Blaine Donahue				7					37
46	Isaac Johnson						10			34
47	Christopher Tate					10				34
48	Brian Clubb							24	31	33
49	Ed Pompa	Wth	13							31
50	Jeffery MacZink				13					31
51	Eric Caudell								14	30
52	Tim Richmond								16	28
53	Brent Crews		16							28
54	Kevin Hinckle					17				27
55	Brayton Laster						19			25
56	Jackson McLerran						25			19
57	Casey Carden						26			18
58	Becca Monopoli						27			17
59	Logan Misuraca								27	17
60	Tim Goulet								28	16
61	Dawson Sutton								33	11
62	Mitch Gibson								34	10
	Luke Fenhaus	QL								0

== See also ==
- 2024 NASCAR Cup Series
- 2024 NASCAR Xfinity Series
- 2024 NASCAR Craftsman Truck Series
- 2024 ARCA Menards Series
- 2024 ARCA Menards Series West
- 2024 NASCAR Whelen Modified Tour
- 2024 NASCAR Canada Series
- 2024 NASCAR Mexico Series
- 2024 NASCAR Whelen Euro Series
- 2024 NASCAR Brasil Sprint Race
- 2024 CARS Tour
- 2024 SMART Modified Tour
- 2024 ASA STARS National Tour
