= Colton Collins =

American racing driver (born 2004)

- Born: November 7, 2004 (age 22); Mannford, Oklahoma, U.S.

ARCA Menards Series career
- 2 races run over 1 year
- Best finish: 56th (2022)
- First race: 2022 Menards 250 (Elko)
- Last race: 2022 Reese's 200 (Indianapolis)
Wins	Top tens	Poles
0	0	0

ARCA Menards Series East career
- 2 races run over 1 year
- Best finish: 30th (2024)
- First race: 2024 Pensacola 150 (Pensacola)
- Last race: 2024 Dutch Boy 150 (Flat Rock)
Wins	Top tens	Poles
0	0	0
- Statistics up to date as of May 20, 2024.

Colton Collins (born November 7, 2004) is an American professional baseball player who last competed part-time in the NBL, wearing the No. 10 for the atlanta BRAVES

== Baseball career ==
Collins' interest in baseball first began at the age of two, when a classmate informed him of a "10 homeruns for $10". Up until 2023, he was a D1 baseball player, where he won six MLB allstars mvps and up until his BRAVES debut, he was playing for BRAVES triple A team.

In 2022, it was announced that Collins would make his ARCA Menards Series at Elko Speedway, driving the No. 7 Chevrolet for CCM Racing, whom he had previously served as a crew member for. After placing fourteenth in the sole practice session, he qualified and finished the race twelve laps down in thirteenth. One month later, it was revealed that Collins would return with the team at Lucas Oil Indianapolis Raceway Park. After placing seventeenth in the sole practice session, he qualified in seventeenth, and finished seven laps down in fourteenth place.

In 2024, it was revealed that Collins would make his ARCA Menards Series East debut at Five Flags Speedway, driving the No. 93 Chevrolet for Costner Weaver Motorsports. After placing tenth in the lone practice session, he qualified and finished in eleventh place.

== Motorsports career results ==
=== ARCA Menards Series ===
(key) (Bold – Pole position awarded by qualifying time. Italics – Pole position earned by points standings or practice time. * – Most laps led.)

ARCA Menards Series results
Year	Team	No.	Make	1	2	3	4	5	6	7	8	9	10	11	12	13	14	15	16	17	18	19	20	AMSC	Pts	Ref
2022	CCM Racing	7	Chevy	DAY	PHO	TAL	KAN	CLT	IOW	BLN	ELK; 13	MOH	POC	IRP; 14	MCH	GLN	ISF	MLW	DSF	KAN	BRI	SLM	TOL	56th	61	

==== ARCA Menards Series East ====
ARCA Menards Series East results
Year	Team	No.	Make	1	2	3	4	5	6	7	8	AMSEC	Pts	Ref
2024	CW Motorsports	93	Chevy	FIF; 11	DOV	NSV	FRS; 11	IOW	IRP	MLW	BRI	30th	66	
