= 2022 Zinsser SmartCoat 200 =

Seventh race of the 2022 ARCA Menards Series

Race details
- Race 7 of 20 of the 2022 ARCA Menards Series; Race 3 of 10 of the 2022 Sioux Chief Showdown
- Date: June 18, 2022
- Official name: 22nd Annual Zinsser SmartCoat 200
- Location: Berlin Raceway, Marne, Michigan
- Course: Permanent racing facility
- Course length: 0.438 miles (0.705 km)
- Distance: 200 laps, 87.6 mi (140.978 km)
- Scheduled distance: 200 laps, 87.6 mi (140.978 km)
- Average speed: 64.716 mph (104.150 km/h)

Pole position
Driver	Daniel Dye	GMS Racing
- Time: 16.671

Most laps led
Driver	Daniel Dye	GMS Racing
- Laps: 192

Winner
No. 18	Sammy Smith	Kyle Busch Motorsports

Television in the United States
- Network: MAVTV
- Announcers: Krista Voda, Jim Tretow

Radio in the United States
- Radio: ARCA

The 2022 Zinsser SmartCoat 200 was the seventh stock car race of the 2022 ARCA Menards Series season, the third race of the 2022 Sioux Chief Showdown, and the 22nd iteration of the event. The race was held on Saturday, June 18, 2022, in Marne, Michigan at Berlin Raceway, a 0.438 mile (0.705 km) permanent tri-oval racetrack. The race took the scheduled 200 laps to complete. Daniel Dye, driving for GMS Racing, dominated the entire race, leading 192 laps. After suffering a mechanical problem with ten laps to go, Sammy Smith, driving for Kyle Busch Motorsports, would take over the lead, and earn his first career ARCA Menards Series win in only his sixth start. To fill out the podium, Tom Hessert III and Jesse Love, both driving for Venturini Motorsports, would finish 2nd and 3rd, respectively.

== Background ==
Berlin Raceway is a 7/16 mile long paved oval race track in Marne, Michigan, near Grand Rapids. The track races weekly as part of NASCAR's Whelen All-American Series. It currently hosts a race in the ARCA Menards Series East tour. The track has held touring series events on the ARCA Menards Series, American Speed Association National Tour, USAC Stock Cars, USAC Silver Crown, World of Outlaws Sprint cars, and World of Outlaws Late Model Series tours.

The track opened in 1950. It was originally a horse track before World War II. Berlin's current track record is 12.513 seconds, set by Brian Gerster in 2018 in a winged sprint car. Berlin Raceway takes its name from the city of Marne's original name "Berlin," which was changed due to Anti-German sentiment following World War I.

=== Entry list ===
- (R) denotes rookie driver

#	Driver	Team	Make	Sponsor
01	D. L. Wilson	Fast Track Racing	Toyota	Wilson Traditional Metals
2	Nick Sanchez	Rev Racing	Chevrolet	Max Siegel Inc.
03	Rita Thomason	Clubb Racing Inc.	Chevrolet	Clubb Racing Inc.
6	Rajah Caruth (R)	Rev Racing	Chevrolet	St. Vincent & The Grenadines Tourism
10	Zachary Tinkle	Fast Track Racing	Chevrolet	Fast Track Racing
11	Ed Pompa	Fast Track Racing	Ford	Cen Pe Co, Double H Ranch
12	Tim Monroe	Fast Track Racing	Chevrolet	Fast Track Racing
15	Tom Hessert III	Venturini Motorsports	Toyota	Venturini Motorsports
17	Taylor Gray	David Gilliland Racing	Ford	Ford Performance
18	Sammy Smith (R)	Kyle Busch Motorsports	Toyota	TMC Transportation
20	Jesse Love (R)	Venturini Motorsports	Toyota	Yahoo!
25	Toni Breidinger (R)	Venturini Motorsports	Toyota	HairClub
27	Dallas Frueh	Richmond Motorsports	Toyota	Immigration Law Center
30	Amber Balcaen (R)	Rette Jones Racing	Ford	ICON Direct
35	Greg Van Alst	Greg Van Alst Motorsports	Ford	CB Fabricating
43	Daniel Dye (R)	GMS Racing	Chevrolet	GMS Racing
48	Brad Smith	Brad Smith Motorsports	Chevrolet	PSST...Copraya Websites
Official entry list

== Practice ==
The only 45-minute practice session was held on Saturday, June 18, at 4:15 PM EST. Daniel Dye, driving for GMS Racing, would set the fastest time in the session, with a time of 16.858 seconds, and a speed of 93.427 mph (150.356 km/h).

Pos.	#	Driver	Team	Make	Time	Speed
1	43	Daniel Dye (R)	GMS Racing	Chevrolet	16.858	93.437
2	18	Sammy Smith (R)	Kyle Busch Motorsports	Toyota	16.874	93.339
3	20	Jesse Love (R)	Venturini Motorsports	Toyota	16.947	92.937
Full practice results

== Qualifying ==
Qualifying was held on Saturday, June 18, at 6:00 PM EST. The qualifying system used is a single-car, two-lap system with only one round. Whoever sets the fastest time in the round wins the pole.

Daniel Dye, driving for GMS Racing, scored the pole for the race, with a time of 16.671 seconds, and a speed of 94.475 mph (152.043 km/h).

=== Full qualifying results ===
Pos.	#	Driver	Team	Make	Time	Speed
1	43	Daniel Dye (R)	GMS Racing	Chevrolet	16.671	94.475
2	18	Sammy Smith (R)	Kyle Busch Motorsports	Toyota	16.711	94.249
3	20	Jesse Love (R)	Venturini Motorsports	Toyota	16.735	94.114
4	17	Taylor Gray	David Gilliland Racing	Ford	16.755	94.002
5	15	Tom Hessert III	Venturini Motorsports	Toyota	16.833	93.566
6	2	Nick Sanchez	Rev Racing	Chevrolet	16.841	93.522
7	6	Rajah Caruth (R)	Rev Racing	Chevrolet	17.020	92.538
8	30	Amber Balcaen (R)	Rette Jones Racing	Ford	17.234	91.389
9	35	Greg Van Alst	Greg Van Alst Motorsports	Ford	17.337	90.846
10	25	Toni Breidinger (R)	Venturini Motorsports	Toyota	17.504	89.979
11	10	Zachary Tinkle	Fast Track Racing	Chevrolet	17.934	87.822
12	12	Tim Monroe	Fast Track Racing	Chevrolet	18.680	84.315
13	27	Dallas Frueh	Richmond Motorsports	Chevrolet	18.881	83.417
14	01	D. L. Wilson	Fast Track Racing	Toyota	19.032	82.755
15	03	Rita Thomason	Clubb Racing Inc.	Chevrolet	19.350	81.395
16	48	Brad Smith	Brad Smith Motorsports	Chevrolet	21.567	73.028
17	11	Ed Pompa	Fast Track Racing	Ford	-	-
Official qualifying results

== Race results ==
Fin.	St	#	Driver	Team	Make	Laps	Led	Status	Pts
1	2	18	Sammy Smith (R)	Kyle Busch Motorsports	Toyota	200	8	Running	47
2	5	15	Tom Hessert III	Venturini Motorsports	Toyota	200	0	Running	42
3	3	20	Jesse Love (R)	Venturini Motorsports	Toyota	200	0	Running	41
4	4	17	Taylor Gray	David Gilliland Racing	Ford	200	0	Running	40
5	7	6	Rajah Caruth (R)	Rev Racing	Chevrolet	200	0	Running	39
6	6	2	Nick Sanchez	Rev Racing	Chevrolet	199	0	Running	38
7	1	43	Daniel Dye (R)	GMS Racing	Chevrolet	198	192	Electrical	40
8	9	35	Greg Van Alst	Greg Van Alst Motorsports	Ford	197	0	Running	36
9	10	25	Toni Breidinger (R)	Venturini Motorsports	Toyota	194	0	Running	35
10	16	48	Brad Smith	Brad Smith Motorsports	Chevrolet	136	0	Handling	34
11	8	30	Amber Balcaen (R)	Rette Jones Racing	Toyota	63	0	Accident	33
12	15	03	Rita Thomason	Clubb Racing Inc.	Chevrolet	41	0	Fuel Pump	32
13	11	10	Zachary Tinkle	Fast Track Racing	Chevrolet	38	0	Transmission	31
14	12	12	Tim Monroe	Fast Track Racing	Chevrolet	14	0	Brakes	30
15	14	01	D. L. Wilson	Fast Track Racing	Toyota	9	0	Brakes	29
16	13	27	Dallas Frueh	Richmond Motorsports	Chevrolet	3	0	Electrical	28
17	17	11	Ed Pompa	Fast Track Racing	Ford	0	0	Did Not Start	27
Official race results

== Standings after the race ==
Drivers' Championship standings

	Pos	Driver	Points
1	1	Rajah Caruth	318
1	2	Nick Sanchez	317 (-1)
	3	Daniel Dye	307 (-11)
	4	Toni Breidinger	269 (-49)
	5	Amber Balcaen	263 (-55)
	6	Greg Van Alst	261 (-57)
	7	Zachary Tinkle	222 (-96)
	8	Brad Smith	217 (-101)
	9	Corey Heim	165 (-153)
3	10	D. L. Wilson	155 (-163)

- Note: Only the first 10 positions are included for the driver standings.

Previous race: 2022 Calypso Lemonade 150	ARCA Menards Series; 2022 season	Next race: 2022 Menards 250
