= 2022 Menards 250 =

Eighth race of the 2022 ARCA Menards Series

Race details
- Race 8 of 20 of the 2022 ARCA Menards Series; Race 4 of 10 of the 2022 Sioux Chief Showdown
- Date: June 25, 2022
- Official name: Seventh Annual Menards 250
- Location: Elko Speedway, Elko New Market, Minnesota
- Course: Permanent racing facility
- Course length: 0.375 miles (0.604 km)
- Distance: 250 laps, 93.750 mi (150.876 km)
- Scheduled distance: 250 laps, 93.750 mi (150.876 km)
- Average speed: 71.098 mph (114.421 km/h)

Pole position
Driver	Sammy Smith	Kyle Busch Motorsports
- Time: 14.397

Most laps led
Driver	Sammy Smith	Kyle Busch Motorsports
- Laps: 233

Winner
No. 18	Sammy Smith	Kyle Busch Motorsports

Television in the United States
- Network: MAVTV
- Announcers: Krista Voda, Jim Tretow

Radio in the United States
- Radio: ARCA

The 2022 Menards 250 was the eighth stock car race of the 2022 ARCA Menards Series season, the fourth race of the 2022 Sioux Chief Showdown, and the seventh iteration of the event. The race was held on Saturday, June 25, 2022, in Elko New Market, Minnesota at Elko Speedway, a 0.375 mile (0.604 km) permanent oval racetrack. The race was contested over 250 laps. Sammy Smith, driving for Kyle Busch Motorsports, dominated the entire race, leading all but 17 laps for his 2nd career ARCA Menards Series win, and his second of the season. To fill out the podium, Jesse Love and Landon Pembelton, both driving for Venturini Motorsports, would finish 2nd and 3rd, respectively.

== Background ==
Elko Speedway, is a 3/8 mile asphalt oval NASCAR-sanctioned race track located in Elko New Market, Minnesota. Elko Speedway is a track in the NASCAR Advance Auto Parts Weekly Series. The track is located in the former Elko portion of the merged city. The track divisions include Limited Late Models, Thunder Car, Legends, Power Stocks, and Bandoleros on regular Saturday Nights.

=== Entry list ===
- (R) denotes rookie driver

#	Driver	Team	Make	Sponsor
01	D. L. Wilson	Fast Track Racing	Chevrolet	Fast Track Racing
2	Nick Sanchez	Rev Racing	Chevrolet	Max Siegel Inc.
03	Alex Clubb	Clubb Racing Inc.	Ford	Clubb Racing Inc.
6	Rajah Caruth (R)	Rev Racing	Chevrolet	St. Vincent & The Grenadines Tourism
7	Colton Collins	CCM Racing	Chevrolet	Red Tide Canopies, Coble Enterprises
10	Zachary Tinkle	Fast Track Racing	Toyota	Fast Track Racing
11	Bryce Haugeberg	Fast Track Racing	Chevrolet	Universal Technical Institute
12	Willie Mullins	Fast Track Racing	Toyota	CW Metals, Crow Wing Recycling
15	Landon Pembelton	Venturini Motorsports	Toyota	Mobil 1
17	Taylor Gray	David Gilliland Racing	Ford	Ford Performance
18	Sammy Smith (R)	Kyle Busch Motorsports	Toyota	Allstate Peterbilt Group
20	Jesse Love (R)	Venturini Motorsports	Toyota	JBL
25	Toni Breidinger (R)	Venturini Motorsports	Toyota	Pit Viper Sunglasses
27	Dallas Frueh	Richmond Motorsports	Chevrolet	Immigration Law Center
30	Amber Balcaen (R)	Rette Jones Racing	Ford	ICON Direct
35	Greg Van Alst	Greg Van Alst Motorsports	Ford	CB Fabricating
43	Daniel Dye (R)	GMS Racing	Chevrolet	Martech Services Company
48	Brad Smith	Brad Smith Motorsports	Chevrolet	PSST...Copraya Websites
55	Tom Hessert III	Venturini Motorsports	Toyota	HessertCars.com
66	Ron Vandermeir Jr.	Vanco Racing	Toyota	Mac Rak Engineered Rak Repair
Official entry list

== Practice ==
The only 45-minute practice session was held on Saturday, June 25, at 3:30 PM CST. Sammy Smith, driving for Kyle Busch Motorsports, was the fastest in the session, with a time of 14.545 seconds, and a speed of 92.815 mph (149.371 km/h).

Pos.	#	Driver	Team	Make	Time	Speed
1	18	Sammy Smith (R)	Kyle Busch Motorsports	Toyota	14.545	92.815
2	20	Jesse Love (R)	Venturini Motorsports	Toyota	14.600	92.466
3	15	Landon Pembelton	Venturini Motorsports	Toyota	14.659	92.094
Full practice results

== Qualifying ==
Qualifying was held on Saturday, June 25, at 5:00 PM CST. The qualifying system used is a single-car, two-lap system with only one round. Whoever sets the fastest time in the round wins the pole.

Sammy Smith, driving for Kyle Busch Motorsports, scored the pole for the race, with a time of 14.397 seconds, and a speed of 93.770 mph (150.908 km/h).

Pos.	#	Name	Team	Make	Time	Speed
1	18	Sammy Smith (R)	Kyle Busch Motorsports	Toyota	14.397	93.770
2	20	Jesse Love (R)	Venturini Motorsports	Toyota	14.410	93.685
3	15	Landon Pembelton	Venturini Motorsports	Toyota	14.433	93.536
4	43	Daniel Dye (R)	GMS Racing	Chevrolet	14.556	92.745
5	55	Tom Hessert III	Venturini Motorsports	Toyota	14.657	92.106
6	17	Taylor Gray	David Gilliland Racing	Ford	14.664	92.062
7	25	Toni Breidinger (R)	Venturini Motorsports	Toyota	14.712	91.762
8	2	Nick Sanchez	Rev Racing	Chevrolet	14.724	91.687
9	35	Greg Van Alst	Greg Van Alst Motorsports	Ford	14.779	91.346
10	12	Willie Mullins	Fast Track Racing	Toyota	14.807	91.173
11	66	Ron Vandermeir Jr.	Vanco Racing	Toyota	14.824	91.069
12	6	Rajah Caruth (R)	Rev Racing	Chevrolet	14.892	90.653
13	7	Colton Collins	CCM Racing	Chevrolet	15.363	87.873
14	11	Bryce Haugeberg	Fast Track Racing	Chevrolet	15.493	87.136
15	27	Dallas Frueh	Richmond Motorsports	Chevrolet	15.725	85.851
16	10	Zachary Tinkle	Fast Track Racing	Toyota	15.866	85.088
17	01	D. L. Wilson	Fast Track Racing	Chevrolet	16.013	84.307
18	48	Brad Smith	Brad Smith Motorsports	Chevrolet	16.731	80.689
19	30	Amber Balcaen (R)	Rette Jones Racing	Ford	-	-
20	03	Alex Clubb	Clubb Racing Inc.	Ford	-	-
Official qualifying results

== Race results ==
Fin.	St	#	Driver	Team	Make	Laps	Led	Status	Pts
1	1	18	Sammy Smith (R)	Kyle Busch Motorsports	Toyota	250	233	Running	49
2	2	20	Jesse Love (R)	Venturini Motorsports	Toyota	250	17	Running	43
3	3	15	Landon Pembelton	Venturini Motorsports	Toyota	250	0	Running	41
4	6	17	Taylor Gray	David Gilliland Racing	Ford	250	0	Running	40
5	4	43	Daniel Dye (R)	GMS Racing	Chevrolet	250	0	Running	39
6	5	55	Tom Hessert III	Venturini Motorsports	Toyota	250	0	Running	38
7	12	6	Rajah Caruth (R)	Rev Racing	Chevrolet	248	0	Running	37
8	9	35	Greg Van Alst	Greg Van Alst Motorsports	Ford	248	0	Running	36
9	10	12	Willie Mullins	Fast Track Racing	Toyota	246	0	Running	35
10	11	66	Ron Vandermeir Jr.	Vanco Racing	Toyota	246	0	Running	34
11	8	2	Nick Sanchez	Rev Racing	Chevrolet	246	0	Running	33
12	7	25	Toni Breidinger (R)	Venturini Motorsports	Toyota	243	0	Running	32
13	13	7	Colton Collins	CCM Racing	Chevrolet	238	0	Running	31
14	14	11	Bryce Haugeberg	Fast Track Racing	Chevrolet	223	0	Running	30
15	20	03	Alex Clubb	Clubb Racing Inc.	Ford	133	0	Running	29
16	18	48	Brad Smith	Brad Smith Motorsports	Chevrolet	116	0	Overheating	28
17	19	30	Amber Balcaen (R)	Rette Jones Racing	Ford	56	0	Engine	27
18	16	10	Zachary Tinkle	Fast Track Racing	Toyota	15	0	Overheating	26
19	17	01	D. L. Wilson	Fast Track Racing	Chevrolet	15	0	Brakes	25
20	15	27	Dallas Frueh	Richmond Motorsports	Chevrolet	3	0	Handling	24
Official race results

== Standings after the race ==
Drivers' Championship standings

	Pos	Driver	Points
	1	Rajah Caruth	355
	2	Nick Sanchez	350 (-5)
	3	Daniel Dye	346 (-9)
	4	Toni Breidinger	301 (-54)
1	5	Greg Van Alst	297 (-58)
1	6	Amber Balcaen	290 (-65)
	7	Zachary Tinkle	248 (-107)
	8	Brad Smith	245 (-110)
3	9	Sammy Smith	184 (-171)
	10	D. L. Wilson	180 (-175)

- Note: Only the first 10 positions are included for the driver standings.

Previous race: 2022 Zinsser SmartCoat 200	ARCA Menards Series; 2022 season	Next race: 2022 Dawn 150
