= Rita Goulet =

American racing driver and police sergeant

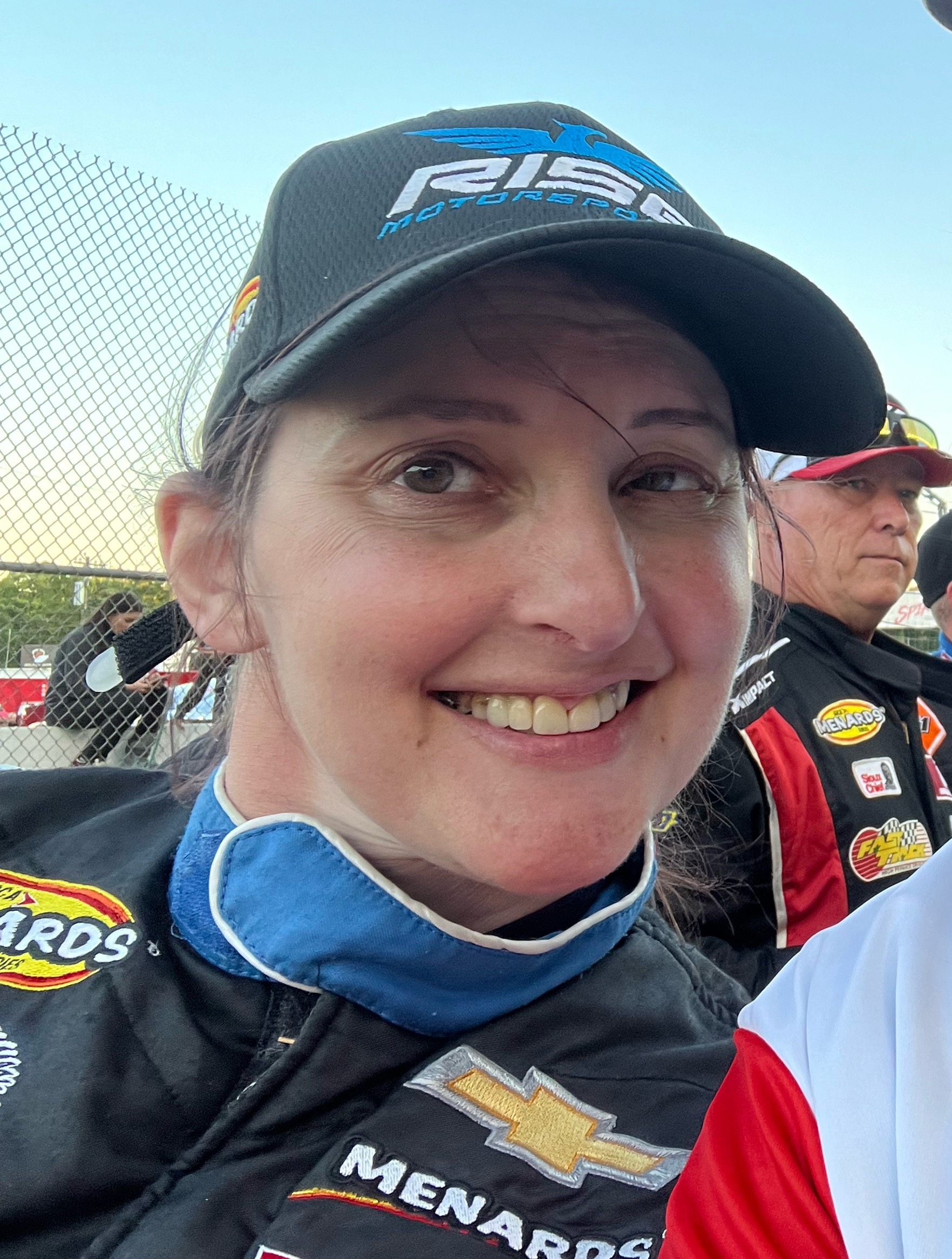
- Goulet at Nashville Fairgrounds Speedway in 2024
- Born: Ritamarie Thomason; August 25, 1983 (age 43); Pawtucket, Rhode Island, U.S.

ARCA Menards Series career
- 17 races run over 4 years
- Best finish: 32nd (2023)
- First race: 2022 Zinsser SmartCoat 200 (Berlin)
- Last race: 2026 LiUNA! 150 (IRP)
Wins	Top tens	Poles
0	0	0

ARCA Menards Series East career
- 21 races run over 5 years
- Best finish: 11th (2024)
- First race: 2022 Sprecher 150 (Milwaukee)
- Last race: 2026 Sunbelt Rentals 150 (Flat Rock)
Wins	Top tens	Poles
0	0	0
- Police career
- Department: Gastonia Police Department
- Service years: 2022–present
- Statistics up to date as of August 1, 2026.

Ritamarie Goulet (née Thomason; born August 25, 1983) is an American professional stock car racing driver and police sergeant. She last competed part-time in the ARCA Menards Series East, driving the No. 13 Toyota for her own team, Integrity Autosports, and currently serves as a police officer for the Gastonia Police Department in North Carolina. She was previously employed as a police sergeant for the Tuscaloosa Police Department in Alabama.

== Early life ==
Thomason was born on August 25, 1983, in Pawtucket, Rhode Island, to a poor family. Thomason eventually settled in Alaska when she was 11. Her parents got divorced when she was 15. She was kicked out of her house, and was moved into a homeless shelter at the age of 16. During the events of 9/11, she continued to live in a homeless shelter, and worked part-time at a tourist attraction in Anchorage. After seeing the attack unfold on a little break room TV, she was desired to help others in difficult situations, which gave her the courage to train as a paramedic. She was transferred into a vocational school to train as a medical assistant. She was later offered an opportunity to finish her paramedic training in Tuscaloosa, Alabama, for which she accepted.

== Law enforcement career ==
After working as a paramedic for five years, Thomason began working as a police sergeant for the Tuscaloosa Police Department in 2011. She states that her persistent desire to help others led to a law enforcement career. She also works as a school resource officer on Monday mornings, a security guard for an apartment complex on Monday and Tuesday nights, and provides security for a local hospital on Thursday nights. During the weekends, she works at a game-style bowling alley.

After moving to Denver, North Carolina in late 2022 with her husband, she began working as an officer for the Gastonia Police Department.

== Racing career ==
=== Early career ===
Thomason's interest for racing came at 11-years old, after her family purchased their first car, a 1983 Subaru wagon. She explained that the car "was more rust than car at this point." She began to drive at the age of 23, and purchased a 1992 Mazda Miata. She officially started racing in 2018, at 33-years old, driving in an autocross event. She found out that amateur club racing was something that she wanted to do, so she began to strip off the interior of her Miata and make it into a race car. She started driving competitively in the SCCA in 2019, racing mostly on road courses. She received her racing license at the end of the season in November. In 2020, she began racing in the ChampCar Endurance Series, along with the 24 Hours of Lemons. That same year, she would earn a couple of wins in the SCCA. After watching old NASCAR races, she decided she wanted to go stock car racing. In 2021, she sold her Miata, along with her trailer, and purchased a 2014 Chevrolet SS stock car. She had her car tuned up by Dick and Bob Rahilly, the owners of RahMoc Enterprises.

=== ARCA Menards Series ===
During the fall of 2021, Thomason tested her stock car at local road courses. She would sign part-time with Clubb Racing Inc. for the 2022 ARCA Menards Series, where she planned to run two road courses, and 2-4 short tracks. She made her first start at Berlin Raceway, where she started 15th, and finished 12th.

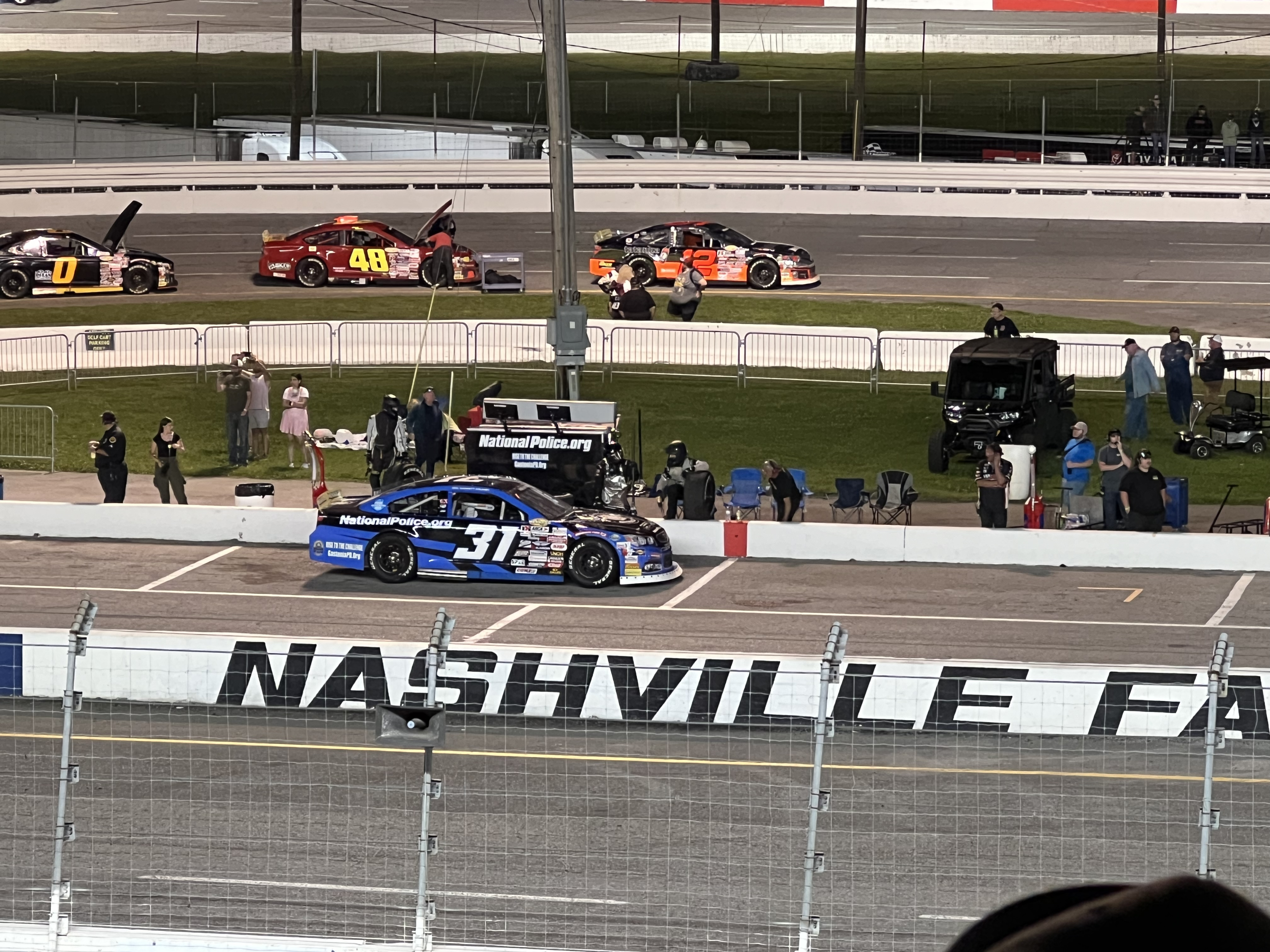
Goulet's No. 31 car at Nashville Fairgrounds Speedway in 2024

Since 2023, Goulet has driven for her own team, Rise Motorsports.

In 2026, she formed a new team, Integrity Autosports, after she left what is now Rise Racing.

== Personal life ==
Thomason met her first husband when she was 17, living at a homeless shelter at the time. They got married two years later. Thomason explains that she was sexually, physically, and financially abused by him. She also explains that he had control of what she did, and wouldn't allow her to drive, which eventually lead to a divorce. She moved to Alabama to avoid contact with her ex-husband, and would later meet her second husband. They both married after the move, but got divorced soon after, as they realized they were better off as friends. She met her third husband a few years later, and sometime during 2022, they divorced.

Thomason met NASCAR pit crew member Tim Goulet in early 2022, and realized that they both had the same goals of owning an ARCA Menards Series team in the near future. Rita and Tim married on January 1, 2023, and they currently reside in Denver, North Carolina, with a daughter and a son from Tim's previous marriage. On March 21, 2026, it was announced the couple was divorcing.

== Motorsports career results ==
=== ARCA Menards Series ===
(key) (Bold – Pole position awarded by qualifying time. Italics – Pole position earned by points standings or practice time. * – Most laps led.)

ARCA Menards Series results
Year	Team	No.	Make	1	2	3	4	5	6	7	8	9	10	11	12	13	14	15	16	17	18	19	20	AMSC	Pts	Ref
2022	Clubb Racing Inc.	03	Chevy	DAY	PHO	TAL	KAN	CLT	IOW	BLN; 12	ELK	MOH; 19	POC	IRP	MCH									37th	100	
2022	Wayne Peterson Racing with Tim Goulet Enterprises	06	Chevy													GLN; 20	ISF							37th	100	
2022	Tim Goulet Enterprises	31	Chevy															MLW; 25	DSF	KAN	BRI	SLM	TOL	37th	100	
2023	Rise Motorsports	31	Chevy	DAY	PHO	TAL	KAN	CLT	BLN	ELK; 14	MOH	IOW; 16	POC	MCH	IRP; 16	GLN	ISF	MLW; 17	DSF	KAN; Wth	BRI; QL	SLM	TOL; 14	32nd	143	
2024	Rise Motorsports	31	Chevy	DAY	PHO	TAL	DOV; 23	KAN	CLT	IOW; 21	MOH	BLN	IRP; 20	SLM; 13	ELK	MCH	ISF	MLW; 23	DSF	GLN	BRI	KAN; 19	TOL	33rd	145	
2026	Integrity Autosports	13	Toyota	DAY	PHO	KAN	TAL	GLN	TOL; 22	MCH	POC	BER	ELK	CHI	LRP	IRP; 22	IOW	ISF	MAD	DSF	SLM	BRI	KAN	78th	44	

==== ARCA Menards Series East ====
ARCA Menards Series East results
Year	Team	No.	Make	1	2	3	4	5	6	7	8	AMSEC	Pts	Ref
2022	Tim Goulet Enterprises	31	Chevy	NSM	FIF	DOV	NSV	IOW	MLW; 25	BRI		56th	19	
2023	Rise Motorsports	31	Chevy	FIF; 15	DOV; 12	NSV; 11	FRS	IOW; 16	IRP; 16	MLW; 17	BRI; QL	14th	177	
2024	Rise Motorsports	31	Chevy	FIF; 13	DOV; 23	NSV; 13	FRS; 14	IOW; 21	IRP; 20	MLW; 23	BRI	11th	231	
2025	Rise Motorsports	31	Toyota	FIF; 19	CAR		FRS; 12	DOV	IRP	IOW	BRI	28th	85	
2025	Wayne Peterson Racing	01	Chevy			NSV; 16						28th	85	
2026	Integrity Autosports	13	Toyota	HCY	CAR	NSV; 13	TOL; 22	IRP; 22	FRS; 15	IOW	BRI	22nd	104	
