= Tim Goulet =

American racing driver (born 1981)

T. J. Curran
- Curran's No. 31 car at the Las Vegas Motor Speedway Bullring in 2026
- Born: November 13, 1981 (age 44); Milwaukee, Wisconsin, U.S.

ARCA Menards Series career
- 10 races run over 3 years
- Best finish: 32nd (2025)
- First race: 2023 Berlin ARCA 200 (Berlin)
- Last race: 2025 Allen Crowe 100 (Springfield)
Wins	Top tens	Poles
0	0	0

ARCA Menards Series East career
- 3 races run over 3 years
- Best finish: 55th (2023)
- First race: 2023 Bush's Beans 200 (Bristol)
- Last race: 2025 Rockingham ARCA 125 (Rockingham)
Wins	Top tens	Poles
0	0	0

ARCA Menards Series West career
- 2 races run over 2 years
- Best finish: 59th (2025)
- First race: 2025 ARCA Menards Series West 150 presented by the West Coast Stock Car Motorsports Hall of Fame (Tucson)
- Last race: 2026 Kyle Busch Classic (LVMS Bullring)
Wins	Top tens	Poles
0	0	0
- Statistics up to date as of October 2, 2026.

T. J. Curran, formerly known as Tim Goulet, (born November 13, 1981) is an American professional stock car racing driver, crew chief, and team owner. He last competed part-time in the ARCA Menards Series West, driving the No. 31 Chevrolet for Rise Racing. He has previously worked as a crew member for Mike Harmon Racing, MBM Motorsports, and Jesse Iwuji Motorsports.

== Racing career ==
Curran first had an interest in racing after attending the NASCAR Craftsman Truck Series races at the Milwaukee Mile, and would race late models in various local dirt-tracks. He would go on to school to become an industrial mechanic, and would later move himself and his family to North Carolina, where he would be employed with Mike Harmon Racing as a pit crew member, a car chief, and later on, would go on to be a crew chief for the team. He would then go on to work for various teams like MBM Motorsports and Jesse Iwuji Motorsports, before forming his own team in 2022 with fellow driver Rita Thomason. The team would make their debut at the ARCA Menards Series race at Milwaukee with Thomason driving the No. 31 Chevrolet, where she would go on to finish 25th due to engine issues.

In 2023, Curran would make his ARCA Menards Series debut at Berlin Raceway, driving the No. 31 Chevrolet for his own team, Rise Motorsports, where he would finish in twelfth position, albeit multiple laps down.

In 2026, Curran was indefinitely suspended by ARCA due to an outstanding warrant filed against him.

== Personal life ==
Curran was married to fellow driver Rita Goulet (formerly Rita Thomason), who also competes part-time in ARCA, whom he first met in early 2022. They eventually married on January 1, 2023. They also have a son from a previous marriage of Tim's. On March 21, 2026, it was announced the couple was divorcing.

== Motorsports career results ==
=== ARCA Menards Series ===
(key) (Bold – Pole position awarded by qualifying time. Italics – Pole position earned by points standings or practice time. * – Most laps led. ** – All laps led.)

ARCA Menards Series results
Year	Team	No.	Make	1	2	3	4	5	6	7	8	9	10	11	12	13	14	15	16	17	18	19	20	AMSC	Pts	Ref
2023	Rise Motorsports	31	Chevy	DAY	PHO	TAL	KAN	CLT	BLN; 12	ELK	MOH	IOW	POC	MCH; 16	IRP	GLN	ISF	MLW	DSF	KAN	BRI; 28	SLM	TOL	50th	76	
2024	Rise Motorsports	31	Chevy	DAY	PHO	TAL	DOV	KAN	CLT	IOW	MOH	BLN; 13	IRP	SLM	ELK	MCH	ISF	MLW	DSF	GLN	BRI; 28	KAN	TOL	72nd	47	
2025	Rise Motorsports	31	Toyota	DAY; Wth	PHO	TAL; 24	KAN; 14	CLT	MCH	BLN; 14	ELK	LRP; 14	DOV	IRP	IOW	GLN	ISF; 16	MAD	DSF	BRI	SLM	KAN	TOL	32nd	138	

==== ARCA Menards Series East ====
ARCA Menards Series East results
Year	Team	No.	Make	1	2	3	4	5	6	7	8	AMSWC	Pts	Ref
2023	Rise Motorsports	31	Chevy	FIF	DOV	NSV	FRS	IOW	IRP	MLW	BRI; 28	55th	16	
2024	Rise Motorsports	31	Chevy	FIF	DOV	NSV	FRS	IOW	IRP	MLW	BRI; 28	60th	16	
2025	Rise Motorsports	31	Toyota	FIF	CAR; 19	NSV	FRS	DOV	IRP	IOW	BRI	64th	25	

==== ARCA Menards Series West ====
ARCA Menards Series West results
Year	Team	No.	Make	1	2	3	4	5	6	7	8	9	10	11	12	13	AMSWC	Pts	Ref
2023	Rise Motorsports	31	Chevy	PHO	IRW	KCR	PIR	SON	IRW	SHA	EVG	AAS	LVS; Wth	MAD	PHO		N/A	0	
2024	Rise Motorsports	31	Chevy	PHO	KER	PIR	SON	IRW	IRW; Wth	SHA	TRI; Wth	MAD	AAS	KER	PHO		N/A	0	
2025	Rise Motorsports	31	Toyota	KER	PHO	TUC; 13	CNS	KER	SON	TRI	PIR	AAS	MAD	LVS	PHO		59th	31	
2026	Rise Racing	31	Chevy	KER	PHO	TUC	SHA	CNS	TRI	SON	PIR	AAS	MAD	LVS; 24	PHO	KER	82nd	20	
