= Andrew Patterson (racing driver) =

American racing driver (born 2002)

- Patterson at Las Vegas Motor Speedway in 2026
- Born: Andrew Daniel Patterson; November 20, 2002 (age 23); Dayton, Ohio, U.S.

NASCAR O'Reilly Auto Parts Series career
- 9 races run over 1 year
- 2026 position: 33rd
- Best finish: 33rd (2026)
- First race: 2026 NFPA 250 (Martinsville)
- Last race: 2026 O'Reilly Auto Parts 300 (Homestead)
Wins	Top tens	Poles
0	0	0

ARCA Menards Series career
- 14 races run over 3 years
- Best finish: 18th (2025)
- First race: 2024 Zinsser SmartCoat 150 (Mid-Ohio)
- Last race: 2026 Bush's Best 200 (Bristol)
Wins	Top tens	Poles
0	5	0

ARCA Menards Series East career
- 11 races run over 3 years
- Best finish: 11th (2025)
- First race: 2024 Music City 150 (Nashville Fairgrounds)
- Last race: 2026 Bush's Best 200 (Bristol)
Wins	Top tens	Poles
0	2	0
- Statistics up to date as of November 7, 2026.

Andrew Daniel Patterson (born November 20, 2002) is an American professional stock car racing driver. He last competed part-time in the NASCAR O'Reilly Auto Parts Series, driving the No. 32 Chevrolet Camaro SS for Jordan Anderson Racing, and part-time in the ARCA Menards Series, driving the No. 40 Chevrolet SS for Andrew Patterson Racing.

== Racing career ==
From 2022 to 2023, Patterson competed in series such as the USSA Mel Kenyon Midget Series and the Show Me The Money Pro Late Model Series.

In 2024, Patterson participated in the pre-season test at Daytona International Speedway, driving the No. 73 Ford for KLAS Motorsports, and placed in the top-twenty in the overall results between the two testing days, although he was involved in a crash with Jeff Scofield during the second day of testing. In May of that year, it was announced that Patterson would drive in select races in the ARCA Menards Series and ARCA Menards Series East for MAN Motorsports and the No. 95 Toyota. He made his debut at Nashville Fairgrounds Speedway, driving the No. 96 for MAN as Hunter Wright was assigned to drive the No. 95. After placing ninth in the lone practice session, he qualified in sixth and finished one lap down in fifth place.

In 2025, Patterson formed his own team, Andrew Patterson Racing, for a part-time stint in ARCA. He earned his best finish of sixth at Charlotte during that stint. On September 16, it was revealed that Patterson would drive the No. 70 Toyota for Nitro Motorsports at Salem Speedway. He went on to finish second behind eventual race winner Brenden Queen. Later on, it was revealed that he would attempt to make his debut in the NASCAR Xfinity Series at the Charlotte Motor Speedway Roval, driving the No. 32 Chevrolet for Jordan Anderson Racing, which he failed to qualify for.

Patterson's No. 32 car at Las Vegas Motor Speedway in 2026.

On March 19, 2026, it was announced that Patterson would drive in eight races in the now renamed NASCAR O'Reilly Auto Parts Series, once again driving the No. 32 for JAR.

== Personal life ==
Patterson moved to Statesville, North Carolina in 2020, where he served as an intern for Jordan Anderson Racing.

== Motorsports results ==
=== Stock car career summary ===
Season	Series	Team	Races	Wins	Top 5	Top 10	Points	Position
2024	CARS Late Model Stock Car Tour	Andrew Patterson Racing	1	0	0	0	0	N/A
2024	ARCA Menards Series East	MAN Motorsports	4	0	1	1	175	17th
2024	ARCA Menards Series	MAN Motorsports	5	0	0	0	130	36th
2025	ARCA Menards Series East	Andrew Patterson Racing	5	0	0	1	145	11th
2025	ARCA Menards Series	Andrew Patterson Racing	5	0	0	3	213	18th
2025	ARCA Menards Series	Nitro Motorsports	1	0	1	1	213	18th
2025	NASCAR Xfinity Series	Jordan Anderson Racing	0	0	0	0	0	104th
2026	ARCA Menards Series East	Andrew Patterson Racing	2	0	0	1	70	36th
2026	ARCA Menards Series	Andrew Patterson Racing	3	0	0	1	89	49th
2026	NASCAR O'Reilly Auto Parts Series	Jordan Anderson Racing	9	0	0	0	134	33rd

=== NASCAR ===
(key) (Bold – Pole position awarded by qualifying time. Italics – Pole position earned by points standings or practice time. * – Most laps led.)

==== O'Reilly Auto Parts Series ====
NASCAR O'Reilly Auto Parts Series results
Year	Team	No.	Make	1	2	3	4	5	6	7	8	9	10	11	12	13	14	15	16	17	18	19	20	21	22	23	24	25	26	27	28	29	30	31	32	33	NOAPSC	Pts	Ref
2025	Jordan Anderson Racing	32	Chevy	DAY	ATL	COA	PHO	LVS	HOM	MAR	DAR	BRI	CAR	TAL	TEX	CLT	NSH	MXC	POC	ATL	CSC	SON	DOV	IND	IOW	GLN	DAY	PIR	GTW	BRI	KAN	ROV; DNQ	LVS	TAL	MAR	PHO	104th	0	
2026	Jordan Anderson Racing	32	Chevy	DAY	ATL	COA	PHO	LVS	DAR	MAR; 31	CAR; 21	BRI	KAN	TAL	TEX	GLN	DOV; 19	CLT; 28	NSH	POC	COR; 14	SON	CHI	ATL	IND	IOW	DAY	DAR	GTW	BRI; 19	LVS; 22	CLT	PHO; 14	TAL	MAR	HOM; 31	33rd	134	

^{*} Season still in progress
^{1} Ineligible for series points

=== ARCA Menards Series ===
(key) (Bold – Pole position awarded by qualifying time. Italics – Pole position earned by points standings or practice time. * – Most laps led.)

ARCA Menards Series results
Year	Team	No.	Make	1	2	3	4	5	6	7	8	9	10	11	12	13	14	15	16	17	18	19	20	AMSC	Pts	Ref
2024	MAN Motorsports	95	Toyota	DAY	PHO	TAL	DOV	KAN	CLT	IOW	MOH; 22	BLN	IRP; 12	SLM; 22	ELK	MCH	ISF	MLW; 16	DSF	GLN	BRI; 18	KAN	TOL	36th	130	
2025	Andrew Patterson Racing	40	Chevy	DAY	PHO	TAL	KAN	CLT; 6	MCH	BLN	ELK	LRP	DOV; 10	IRP; 12	IOW	GLN	ISF	MAD	DSF	BRI; 13		KAN; 8	TOL	18th	213	
2025	Nitro Motorsports	70	Toyota																		SLM; 2			18th	213	
2026	Andrew Patterson Racing	40	Chevy	DAY; DNQ	PHO	KAN										IRP; 6	IOW	ISF	MAD	DSF	SLM	BRI; 12	KAN	49th	89	
2026	Andrew Patterson Racing	1	Chevy				TAL; 28	GLN	TOL	MCH	POC	BER	ELK	CHI	LRP									49th	89	

==== ARCA Menards Series East ====
ARCA Menards Series East results
Year	Team	No.	Make	1	2	3	4	5	6	7	8	AMSEC	Pts	Ref
2024	MAN Motorsports	96	Toyota	FIF	DOV	NSV; 5	FRS	IOW				17th	175	
2024	MAN Motorsports	95	Toyota						IRP; 12	MLW; 16	BRI; 18	17th	175	
2025	Andrew Patterson Racing	40	Chevy	FIF; 22	CAR; 18	NSV	FRS	DOV; 10	IRP; 12	IOW	BRI; 13	11th	145	
2026	Andrew Patterson Racing	40	Chevy	HCY	CAR	NSV	TOL	IRP; 6	FRS	IOW	BRI; 12	36th	70	

=== CARS Late Model Stock Car Tour ===
(key) (Bold – Pole position awarded by qualifying time. Italics – Pole position earned by points standings or practice time. * – Most laps led. ** – All laps led.)

CARS Late Model Stock Car Tour results
Year	Team	No.	Make	1	2	3	4	5	6	7	8	9	10	11	12	13	14	15	16	17	CLMSCTC	Pts	Ref
2024	Andrew Patterson Racing	31	N/A	SNM	HCY	AAS	OCS	ACE	TCM	LGY	DOM	CRW	HCY	NWS	ACE	WCS	FLC	SBO	TCM; 30	NWS	N/A	0	
