= 2024 Music City 150 =

3rd race of the 2024 ARCA Menards Series East

Race details
- Race 3 of 8 of the 2024 ARCA Menards Series East
- Date: May 11, 2024
- Official name: 4th Annual Music City 150
- Location: Nashville Fairgrounds Speedway in Nashville, Tennessee
- Course: Permanent racing facility
- Course length: 0.596 miles (0.959 km)
- Distance: 150 laps, 89 mi (143 km)
- Scheduled distance: 150 laps, 89 mi (143 km)
- Average speed: 69.362 mph (111.627 km/h)

Pole position
Driver	Gio Ruggiero	Venturini Motorsports
- Time: 19.420

Most laps led
Driver	William Sawalich	Joe Gibbs Racing
- Laps: 145

Winner
No. 18	William Sawalich	Joe Gibbs Racing

Television in the United States
- Network: FloRacing
- Announcers: Charles Krall

Radio in the United States
- Radio: ARCA Racing Network

The 2024 Music City 150 was the 3rd stock car race of the 2024 ARCA Menards Series East season, and the 4th iteration of the event. The race was held on Saturday, May 11, 2024, at the Nashville Fairgrounds Speedway in Nashville, Tennessee, a 0.596 mile (0.959 km) permanent asphalt oval shaped short track. The race took the scheduled 150 laps to complete. William Sawalich, driving for Joe Gibbs Racing, would put on a blistering performance, leading all but five laps in the race to earn his fifth career ARCA Menards Series East win, and his first of the season. Pole-sitter Gio Ruggiero led the first four laps of the race, before he spun and hit the wall on lap 6. He continued to race until lap 49, where he pulled into the pits and retired from the race, officially credited with a 14th-place finish. To fill out the podium, Isabella Robusto, driving for Venturini Motorsports, and Connor Zilisch, driving for Pinnacle Racing Group, would finish 2nd and 3rd, respectively.

== Report ==
=== Background ===
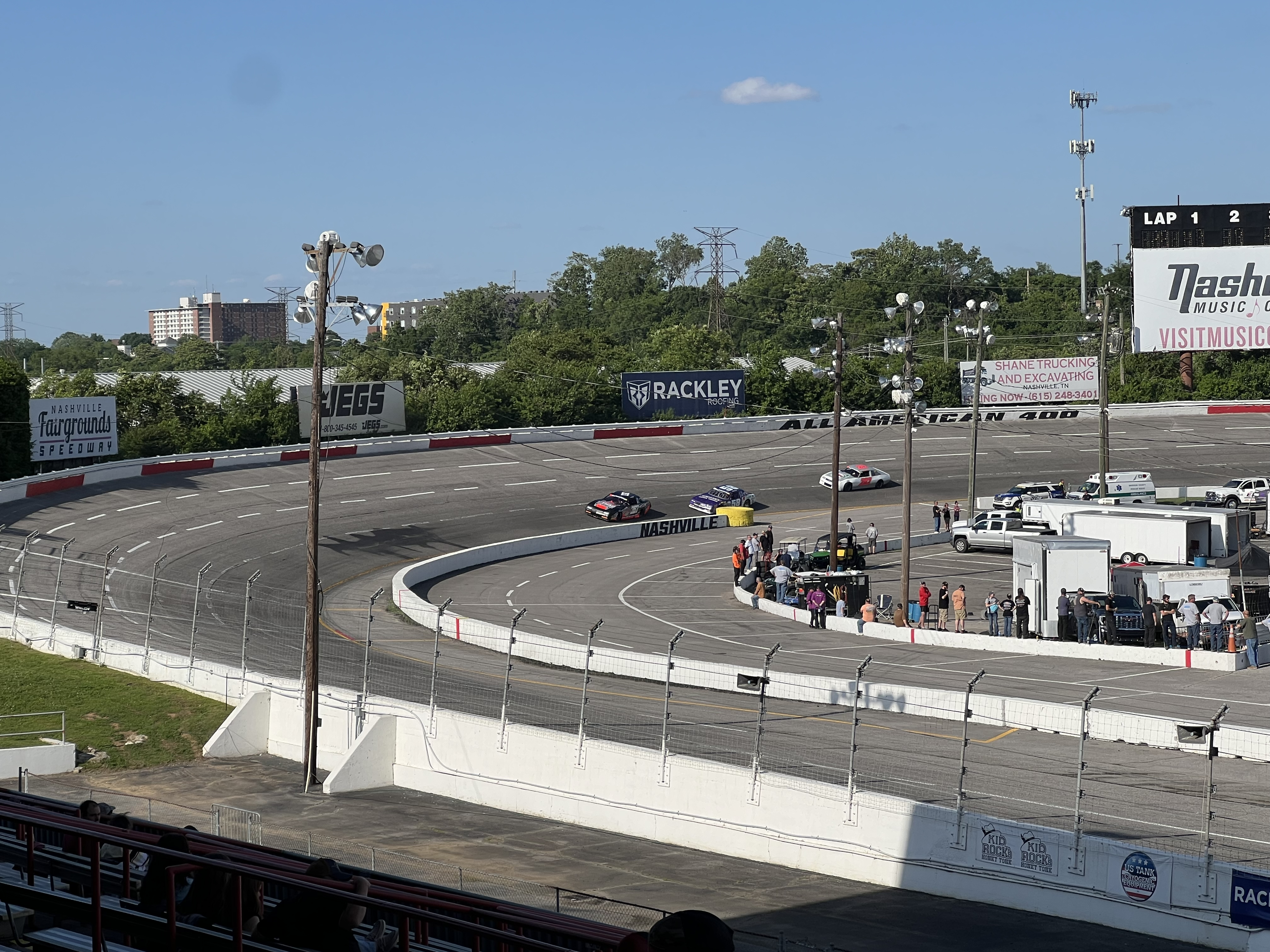
Nashville Fairgrounds Speedway, the circuit where the race was held.

Nashville Fairgrounds Speedway is a motorsport racetrack located at the Nashville Fairgrounds near downtown Nashville, Tennessee. The track is the second-oldest continually operating track in the United States. The track held NASCAR Grand National/Winston Cup (now NASCAR Cup Series) races from 1958 to 1984.

The speedway is currently an 18 degree banked paved oval. The track is 0.596 mi (0.959 km) long. Inside the larger oval is a 1/4 mi (0.40 km) paved oval.

The track was converted to a 1/2 mi (0.80 km) paved oval in 1957, when it began to be a NASCAR series track. The speedway was lengthened between the 1969 and 1970 seasons. The corners were cut down from 35 degrees to their present 18 degrees in 1972. The track was repaved between the 1995 and 1996 seasons.

==== Entry list ====
- (R) denotes rookie driver.

#	Driver	Team	Make	Sponsor
0	Nate Moeller	Wayne Peterson Racing	Ford	Peterson Motorsports
06	Cody Dennison (R)	Wayne Peterson Racing	Toyota	Timcast
07	Tyler Scofield	Scofield Motorsports	Chevrolet	JXT Transportation
10	Jayson Alexander	Fast Track Racing	Toyota	Selwyn Pub / Constant Contact
11	Zachary Tinkle	Fast Track Racing	Toyota	Racing for Rescues
12	Presley Sorah	Fast Track Racing	Toyota	Tatanka Sauce / Layin Coin Podcast
18	William Sawalich	Joe Gibbs Racing	Toyota	Starkey / SoundGear
20	Gio Ruggiero (R)	Venturini Motorsports	Toyota	JBL
28	Connor Zilisch (R)	Pinnacle Racing Group	Chevrolet	Chevrolet / Silver Hare Development
31	Rita Goulet	Rise Motorsports	Chevrolet	NationalPolice.org
39	D. L. Wilson	CW Motorsports	Toyota	Heart O' Texas Speedway / ETR
42	Tanner Reif	Cook Racing Technologies	Chevrolet	Vegas Fastener Manufacturing
48	Brad Smith	Brad Smith Motorsports	Ford	Copraya.com
55	Isabella Robusto	Venturini Motorsports	Toyota	Yahoo!
93	Caleb Costner	CW Motorsports	Chevrolet	Thin Blue Wine Cellars
95	Hunter Wright	MAN Motorsports	Toyota	Cedar City RV
96	Andrew Patterson	MAN Motorsports	Toyota	Winsupply / SCS Gearbox
99	Michael Maples (R)	Fast Track Racing	Chevrolet	Don Ray Petroleum LLC
Official entry list

== Practice ==
The first and only practice session was held on Saturday, May 11, at 2:00 PM CST, and lasted for 60 minutes. William Sawalich, driving for Joe Gibbs Racing, would set the fastest time in the session, with a lap of 19.760, and a speed of 108.583 mph (174.747 km/h).

Pos.	#	Driver	Team	Make	Time	Speed
1	18	William Sawalich	Venturini Motorsports	Toyota	19.760	108.583
2	28	Connor Zilisch (R)	Pinnacle Racing Group	Chevrolet	19.768	108.539
3	20	Gio Ruggiero (R)	Venturini Motorsports	Toyota	19.955	107.522
Full practice results

== Qualifying ==
Qualifying was held on Saturday, May 11, at 4:00 PM CST. The qualifying system used is a single-car, two-lap based system. All drivers will be on track by themselves and will have two laps to post a qualifying time. The driver who sets the fastest time in qualifying will win the pole.

Gio Ruggiero, driving for Venturini Motorsports, would score the pole for the race, with a lap of 19.420, and a speed of 110.484 mph (177.807 km/h).

=== Qualifying results ===
Pos.	#	Driver	Team	Make	Time	Speed
1	20	Gio Ruggiero (R)	Venturini Motorsports	Toyota	19.420	110.484
2	18	William Sawalich	Joe Gibbs Racing	Toyota	19.470	110.200
3	55	Isabella Robusto	Venturini Motorsports	Toyota	19.556	109.716
4	28	Connor Zilisch (R)	Pinnacle Racing Group	Chevrolet	19.764	108.561
5	11	Zachary Tinkle	Fast Track Racing	Toyota	19.913	107.749
6	96	Andrew Patterson	MAN Motorsports	Toyota	19.925	107.684
7	07	Tyler Scofield	Scofield Motorsports	Chevrolet	19.952	107.538
8	95	Hunter Wright	MAN Motorsports	Toyota	20.078	106.863
9	93	Caleb Costner	CW Motorsports	Chevrolet	20.850	102.906
10	39	D. L. Wilson	CW Motorsports	Toyota	20.859	102.862
11	99	Michael Maples (R)	Fast Track Racing	Chevrolet	20.972	102.308
12	10	Jayson Alexander	Fast Track Racing	Toyota	21.527	99.670
13	06	Cody Dennison (R)	Wayne Peterson Racing	Toyota	21.625	99.218
14	12	Presley Sorah	Fast Track Racing	Toyota	21.942	97.785
15	31	Rita Goulet	Rise Motorsports	Chevrolet	22.355	95.979
16	48	Brad Smith	Brad Smith Motorsports	Ford	22.966	93.425
17	0	Nate Moeller	Wayne Peterson Racing	Ford	23.200	92.483
18	42	Tanner Reif	Cook Racing Technologies	Chevrolet	–	–
Official qualifying results

== Race results ==
Fin	St	#	Driver	Team	Make	Laps	Led	Status	Pts
1	2	18	William Sawalich	Joe Gibbs Racing	Toyota	150	145	Running	48
2	3	55	Isabella Robusto	Venturini Motorsports	Toyota	150	1	Running	43
3	4	28	Connor Zilisch (R)	Pinnacle Racing Group	Chevrolet	150	0	Running	41
4	5	11	Zachary Tinkle	Fast Track Racing	Toyota	149	0	Running	40
5	6	96	Andrew Patterson	MAN Motorsports	Toyota	149	0	Running	39
6	7	07	Tyler Scofield	Scofield Motorsports	Chevrolet	149	0	Running	38
7	9	93	Caleb Costner	CW Motorsports	Chevrolet	148	0	Running	37
8	12	10	Jayson Alexander	Fast Track Racing	Toyota	147	0	Running	36
9	8	95	Hunter Wright	MAN Motorsports	Toyota	147	0	Running	35
10	10	39	D. L. Wilson	CW Motorsports	Toyota	146	0	Running	34
11	13	06	Cody Dennison (R)	Wayne Peterson Racing	Toyota	146	0	Running	33
12	11	99	Michael Maples (R)	Fast Track Racing	Chevrolet	146	0	Running	32
13	15	31	Rita Goulet	Rise Motorsports	Chevrolet	135	0	Running	31
14	1	20	Gio Ruggiero (R)	Venturini Motorsports	Toyota	49	4	Accident	32
15	18	42	Tanner Reif	Cook Racing Technologies	Chevrolet	26	0	Accident	29
16	16	48	Brad Smith	Brad Smith Motorsports	Ford	23	0	Handling	28
17	17	0	Nate Moeller	Wayne Peterson Racing	Ford	23	0	Steering	27
18	14	12	Presley Sorah	Fast Track Racing	Toyota	20	0	Brakes	26
Official race results

== Standings after the race ==
Drivers' Championship standings

	Pos	Driver	Points
1	1	Connor Zilisch	129
1	2	William Sawalich	125 (-4)
2	3	Gio Ruggiero	122 (–7)
	4	Zachary Tinkle	110 (–19)
	5	D. L. Wilson	102 (–27)
	6	Cody Dennison	99 (–30)
	7	Michael Maples	94 (–35)
1	8	Rita Goulet	83 (–46)
4	9	Hunter Wright	74 (–55)
9	10	Caleb Costner	72 (–57)

- Note: Only the first 10 positions are included for the driver standings.

Previous race: 2024 General Tire 150	ARCA Menards Series East; 2024 season	Next race: 2024 Dutch Boy 150
