= Cody Dennison =

American racing driver and YouTuber (born 1990)

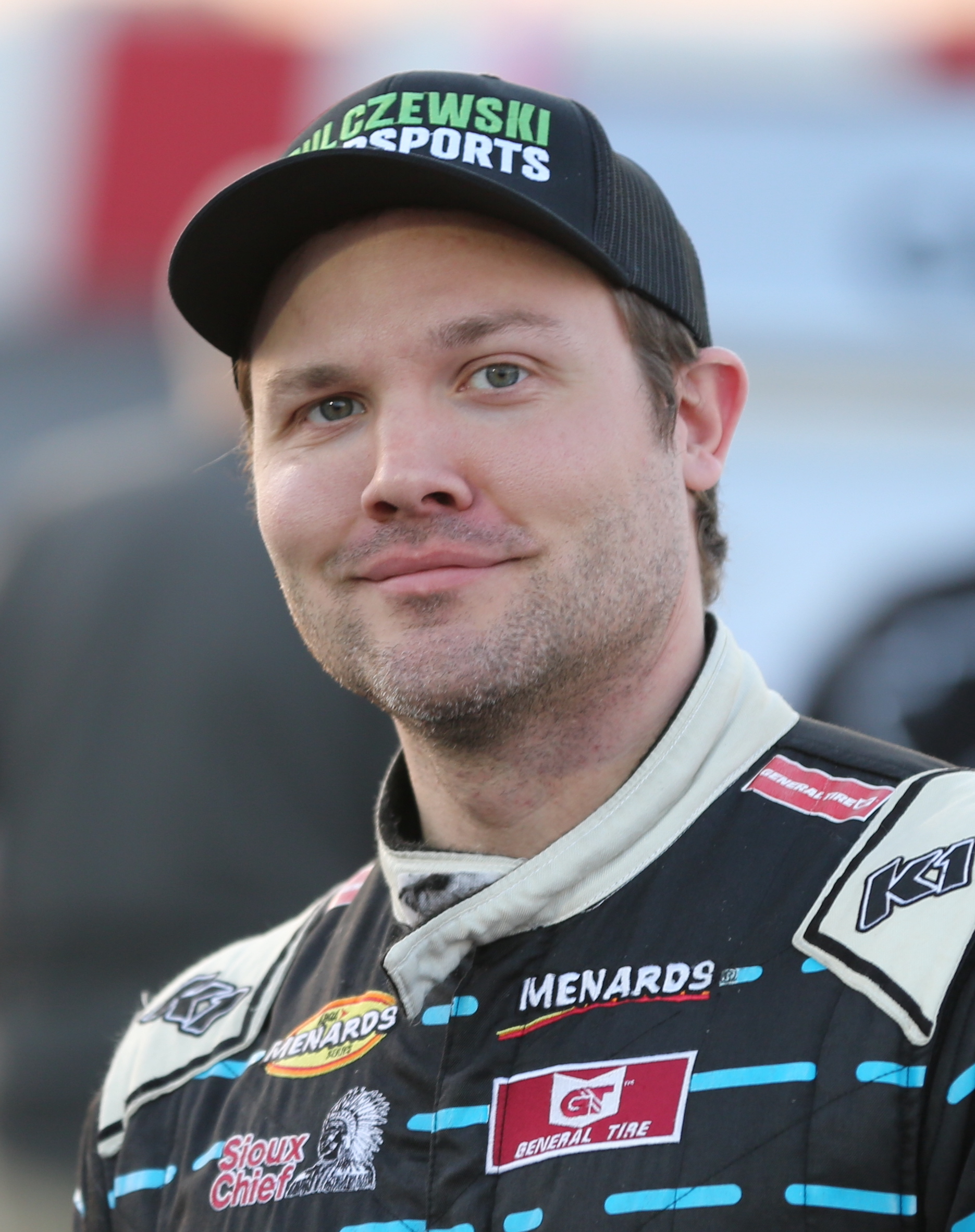
- Dennison at Madera Speedway in 2025
- Born: Cody Blake Dennison; March 4, 1990 (age 36); Hokes Bluff, Alabama, U.S.
- Height: 5 ft 11 in (1.80 m)

NASCAR FedEx Freight Truck Series career
- 7 races run over 1 year
- 2025 position: 34th
- Best finish: 34th (2025)
- First race: 2025 Boys & Girls Club of the Blue Ridge 200 (Martinsville)
- Last race: 2025 TSport 200 (IRP)
Wins	Top tens	Poles
0	0	0

ARCA Menards Series career
- 24 races run over 3 years
- Best finish: 7th (2024)
- First race: 2024 General Tire 200 (Talladega)
- Last race: 2026 Alabama Manufactured Housing 200 (Talladega)
Wins	Top tens	Poles
0	2	0

ARCA Menards Series East career
- 10 races run over 2 years
- Best finish: 6th (2024)
- First race: 2024 Pensacola 150 (Pensacola)
- Last race: 2025 LiUNA! 150 (Indianapolis)
Wins	Top tens	Poles
0	2	0

ARCA Menards Series West career
- 10 races run over 2 years
- Best finish: 11th (2025)
- First race: 2025 West Coast Stock Car Motorsports Hall of Fame 150 (Bakersfield)
- Last race: 2026 NAPA Auto Parts 150 (Bakersfield)
Wins	Top tens	Poles
0	2	0

YouTube information
- Channel: CAMELOT331
- Genres: Comedy, motorsports
- Subscribers: 225,000
- Views: 40,429,070
- Last updated: March 9, 2026
- Statistics up to date as of November 1, 2026.

Cody Blake Dennison (born March 4, 1990) is an American professional stock car racing driver and YouTube personality. He last competed part-time in the ARCA Menards Series West, driving the No. 72 Chevrolet SS for Strike Mamba Racing. He has previously competed in the NASCAR Craftsman Truck Series, the ARCA Menards Series, and the ARCA Menards Series East.

== YouTube career ==
Dennison created the CAMELOT331 channel on YouTube and, in 2013, began posting videos of himself playing various guitar covers up until 2018. In December 2018, he started to post a series of videos that detailed his experiences working as an employee for GameStop, including his eventual firing, which went viral online.

== Racing career ==
Dennison began racing professionally in 2022, where he ran four races in the Grand National Super Series, driving an old Ryan Newman Dodge from 2007. In his four starts that year, he finished in the top ten in all four starts, with a best finish of fifth at Dillon Motor Speedway. He expanded his racing schedule the following year, running in eighteen of the twenty-two races that were held that year, driving in his own Dodge, but also for ShoTime Motorsports and Bob Schacht Motorsports. He finished in the top-ten fifteen times with a best finish of fifth at both New River All-American Speedway events and Carteret County Speedway and finished sixth in the final points standings.

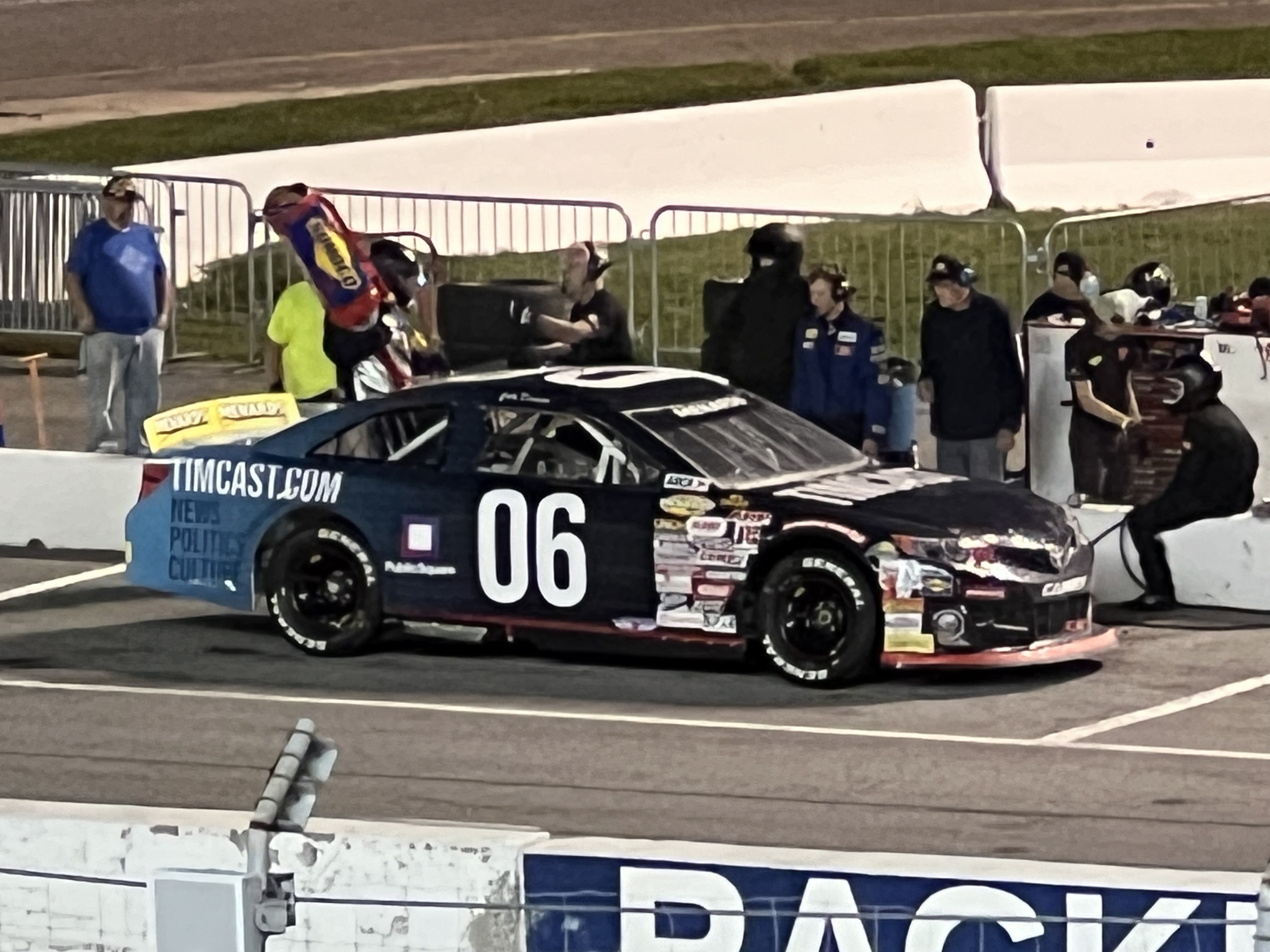
Dennison's No. 06 car at Nashville Fairgrounds Speedway in 2024

In 2024, Dennison participated in pre-season testing for the ARCA Menards Series at Daytona International Speedway driving for Wayne Peterson Racing in the No. 06 Toyota. Several days after the test, it was revealed that Dennison would attempt to make his ARCA debut at Daytona, driving for Clubb Racing Inc. in the No. 86 Ford. He ultimately failed to qualify after setting the slowest time in both practice and qualifying. Several weeks later, it was revealed that Dennison would once again attempt to make his debut at Phoenix Raceway, this time driving for Wayne Peterson Racing in the No. 06 Toyota. After placing 35th in the lone practice session, he once again failed to qualify after setting the 35th quickest time. Several days later, it was revealed that Dennison will make his debut in the ARCA Menards Series East, driving for Peterson in the No. 06. After placing eleventh in the sole practice session, he went on to qualify twelfth and finish tenth in the race, albeit eight laps down to race winner Gio Ruggiero. Less than a month later, it was revealed that Dennison would drive the No. 01 Ford for Fast Track Racing at Talladega Superspeedway, where he finished in seventeenth place. He then finished twelfth in the combination race with the East Series at Dover Motor Speedway with WPR, and finished sixteenth in the following race at Kansas Speedway for Fast Track Racing. He then finished eleventh and tenth in the following East Series races at Nashville Fairgrounds Speedway and Flat Rock Speedway respectively before finishing thirteenth at Charlotte Motor Speedway whilst driving for Fast Track.

On June 10, 2024, it was announced that Dennison would run the remainder of the ARCA season with CW Motorsports, driving the No. 93 Chevrolet, although he only ran at Iowa Speedway before returning back to Fast Track Racing. Dennison, despite driving for four different teams and not qualifying for two races, was able to finish the season seventh in the points standings with two top-tens. Also in the ARCA East Series, Dennison finished sixth in the points standings with two top-tens.

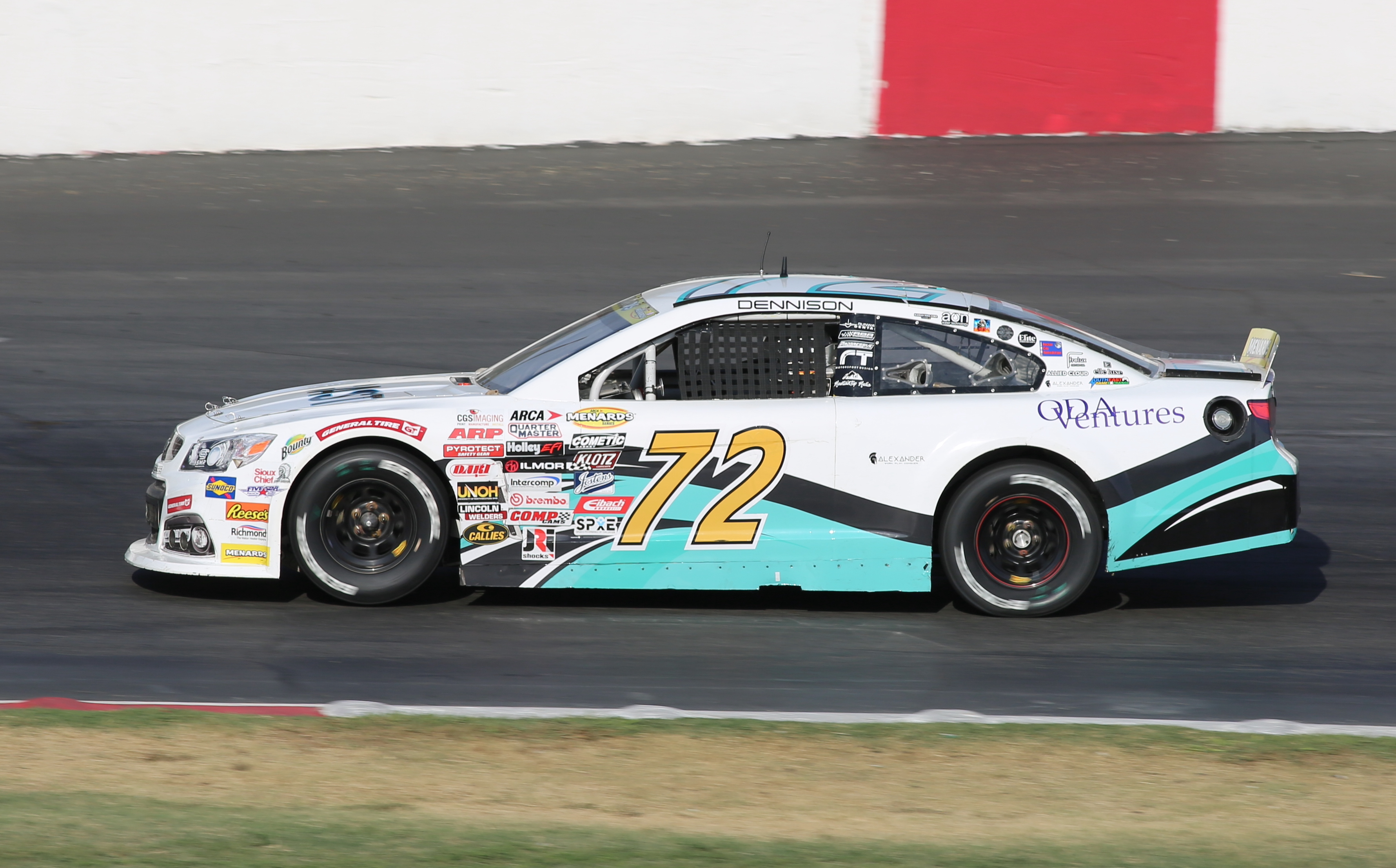
Dennison's No. 72 car at Madera Speedway in 2025

On January 19, 2025, it was announced that Dennison would drive the No. 72 part-time in the ARCA Menards Series West for Strike Mamba Racing. Two days later, it was announced that he will drive a partial schedule in the NASCAR Craftsman Truck Series for Reaume Brothers Racing, driving the No. 2 Ford. After making seven starts with the team, and getting a best finish of nineteenth at Texas Motor Speedway, he would later be released, with Dennison claiming he was "canceled" for "being a conservative" in response. He then ran the final three races of the West Series season with SMR, getting a best finish of Madera Speedway, and finished eleventh in the standings despite running only six races.

== Motorsports career results ==
=== Stock car career summary ===
Season	Series	Team	Races	Wins	Top 5	Top 10	Points	Position
2024	ARCA Menards Series West	Wayne Peterson Racing	0	0	0	0	0	N/A
2024	ARCA Menards Series East	Wayne Peterson Racing	4	0	0	2	347	6th
2024	ARCA Menards Series East	CW Motorsports	1	0	0	0	347	6th
2024	ARCA Menards Series East	Fast Track Racing	3	0	0	0	347	6th
2024	ARCA Menards Series	Clubb Racing Inc.	0	0	0	0	740	7th
2024	ARCA Menards Series	Wayne Peterson Racing	1	0	0	0	740	7th
2024	ARCA Menards Series	Fast Track Racing	16	0	0	2	740	7th
2024	ARCA Menards Series	CW Motorsports	1	0	0	0	740	7th
2025	ARCA Menards Series West	Strike Mamba Racing	5	0	0	2	225	11th
2025	ARCA Menards Series West	Fast Track Racing	1	0	0	0	225	11th
2025	ARCA Menards Series East	Fast Track Racing	2	0	0	0	53	42nd
2025	ARCA Menards Series	Fast Track Racing	4	0	0	0	76	60th
2025	NASCAR Craftsman Truck Series	Reaume Brothers Racing	7	0	0	0	65	34th
2026	ARCA Menards Series West	Strike Mamba Racing	4	0	0	0	103	24th
2026	ARCA Menards Series	Strike Mamba Racing	1	0	0	0	56	69th
2026	ARCA Menards Series	Fast Track Racing	1	0	0	0	56	69th

=== NASCAR ===
(key) (Bold – Pole position awarded by qualifying time. Italics – Pole position earned by points standings or practice time. * – Most laps led.)

==== Craftsman Truck Series ====
NASCAR Craftsman Truck Series results
Year	Team	No.	Make	1	2	3	4	5	6	7	8	9	10	11	12	13	14	15	16	17	18	19	20	21	22	23	24	25	NCTC	Pts	Ref
2025	Reaume Brothers Racing	2	Ford	DAY	ATL	LVS	HOM	MAR; 30	BRI		TEX; 19	KAN; 22	NWS	CLT; 29	NSH	MCH	POC; 33	LRP	IRP; 34	GLN	RCH	DAR	BRI	NHA	ROV	TAL	MAR	PHO	34th	65	
2025	Reaume Brothers Racing	22	Ford							CAR; 27																			34th	65	

^{*} Season still in progress
^{1} Ineligible for series points

=== ARCA Menards Series ===
(key) (Bold – Pole position awarded by qualifying time. Italics – Pole position earned by points standings or practice time. * – Most laps led. ** – All laps led.)

ARCA Menards Series results
Year	Team	No.	Make	1	2	3	4	5	6	7	8	9	10	11	12	13	14	15	16	17	18	19	20	AMSC	Pts	Ref
2024	Clubb Racing Inc.	86	Ford	DAY; DNQ																				7th	740	
2024	Wayne Peterson Racing	06	Toyota		PHO; DNQ		DOV; 12																	7th	740	
2024	Fast Track Racing	01	Ford			TAL; 17																		7th	740	
2024	Fast Track Racing	11	Ford					KAN; 16																7th	740	
2024	Fast Track Racing	10	Toyota						CLT; 13									MLW; 13			BRI; 17			7th	740	
2024	CW Motorsports	93	Chevy							IOW; 18														7th	740	
2024	Fast Track Racing	11	Toyota								MOH; 15	BLN; 16		SLM; 7	ELK; 11	MCH; 11	ISF; 12		DSF; 12	GLN; 24		KAN; 22	TOL; 8	7th	740	
2024	Fast Track Racing	01	Toyota										IRP; 14											7th	740	
2025	Fast Track Racing	11	Chevy	DAY; 34																				60th	76	
2025	Fast Track Racing	11	Toyota		PHO; 16																			60th	76	
2025	Fast Track Racing	9	Toyota			TAL; 32	KAN	CLT	MCH	BLN	ELK	LRP	DOV	IRP; 18	IOW	GLN	ISF	MAD	DSF	BRI	SLM	KAN	TOL	60th	76	
2026	Strike Mamba Racing	72	Chevy	DAY	PHO; 19	KAN																		69th	56	
2026	Fast Track Racing	01	Ford				TAL; 13	GLN	TOL	MCH	POC	BER	ELK	CHI	LRP	IRP	IOW	ISF	MAD	DSF	SLM	BRI	KAN	69th	56	

==== ARCA Menards Series East ====
ARCA Menards Series East results
Year	Team	No.	Make	1	2	3	4	5	6	7	8	AMSEC	Pts	Ref
2024	Wayne Peterson Racing	06	Toyota	FIF; 10	DOV; 12	NSV; 11	FRS; 10					6th	347	
2024	CW Motorsports	93	Chevy					IOW; 18				6th	347	
2024	Fast Track Racing	01	Toyota						IRP; 14			6th	347	
2024	Fast Track Racing	10	Toyota							MLW; 13	BRI; 17	6th	347	
2025	Fast Track Racing	9	Toyota	FIF; 17	CAR	NSV	FRS	DOV	IRP; 18	IOW	BRI	42nd	53	

==== ARCA Menards Series West ====
ARCA Menards Series West results
Year	Team	No.	Make	1	2	3	4	5	6	7	8	9	10	11	12	13	AMSWC	Pts	Ref
2024	Wayne Peterson Racing	06	Toyota	PHO; DNQ	KER	PIR	SON	IRW	IRW	SHA	TRI	MAD	AAS	KER	PHO		N/A	0	
2025	Strike Mamba Racing	72	Chevy	KER; 8		TUC; 10	CNS	KER	SON	TRI	PIR	AAS	MAD; 13	LVS; 20	PHO; 22		11th	225	
2025	Fast Track Racing	11	Toyota		PHO; 16												11th	225	
2026	Strike Mamba Racing	72	Chevy	KER; 14	PHO; 19	TUC	SHA	CNS	TRI	SON	PIR	AAS	MAD	LVS	PHO; 21	KER; 19	24th	103	
