= 2024 Pensacola 150 =

1st race of the 2024 ARCA Menards Series East

Race details
- Race 1 of 8 of the 2024 ARCA Menards Series East
- Date: March 23, 2024
- Official name: 5th Annual Pensacola 150
- Location: Five Flags Speedway in Pensacola, Florida
- Course: Permanent racing facility
- Course length: 0.5 miles (0.80 km)
- Distance: 150 laps, 75 mi (120 km)
- Scheduled distance: 150 laps, 75 mi (120 km)
- Average speed: 74.298 mph (119.571 km/h)

Pole position
Driver	William Sawalich	Joe Gibbs Racing
- Time: 17.126

Most laps led
Driver	William Sawalich	Joe Gibbs Racing
- Laps: 80

Winner
No. 20	Gio Ruggiero	Venturini Motorsports

Television in the United States
- Network: FloRacing
- Announcers: Charles Krall

Radio in the United States
- Radio: ARCA Racing Network

The 2024 Pensacola 150 was the first stock car race of the 2024 ARCA Menards Series East season, and the 5th running of the event. The race was held on Saturday, March 23, 2024, at Five Flags Speedway in Pensacola, Florida, a 0.5 mile (0.80 km) permanent asphalt oval shaped short track. The race took the scheduled 150 laps to complete. In a thrilling race that featured an intense battle between Gio Ruggiero and William Sawalich, Ruggiero, driving for Venturini Motorsports, would take the lead from Sawalich on the final restart following the race break, and held him off for the final 70 laps to earn his first career ARCA Menards Series East win. Sawalich, who started on the pole, dominated the first half of the race, leading a race-high 80 laps before losing the lead on the final restart and ultimately finished 2nd. To fill out the podium, Bubba Pollard, driving for Phoenix Racing, would finish 3rd, respectively.

== Report ==
=== Background ===
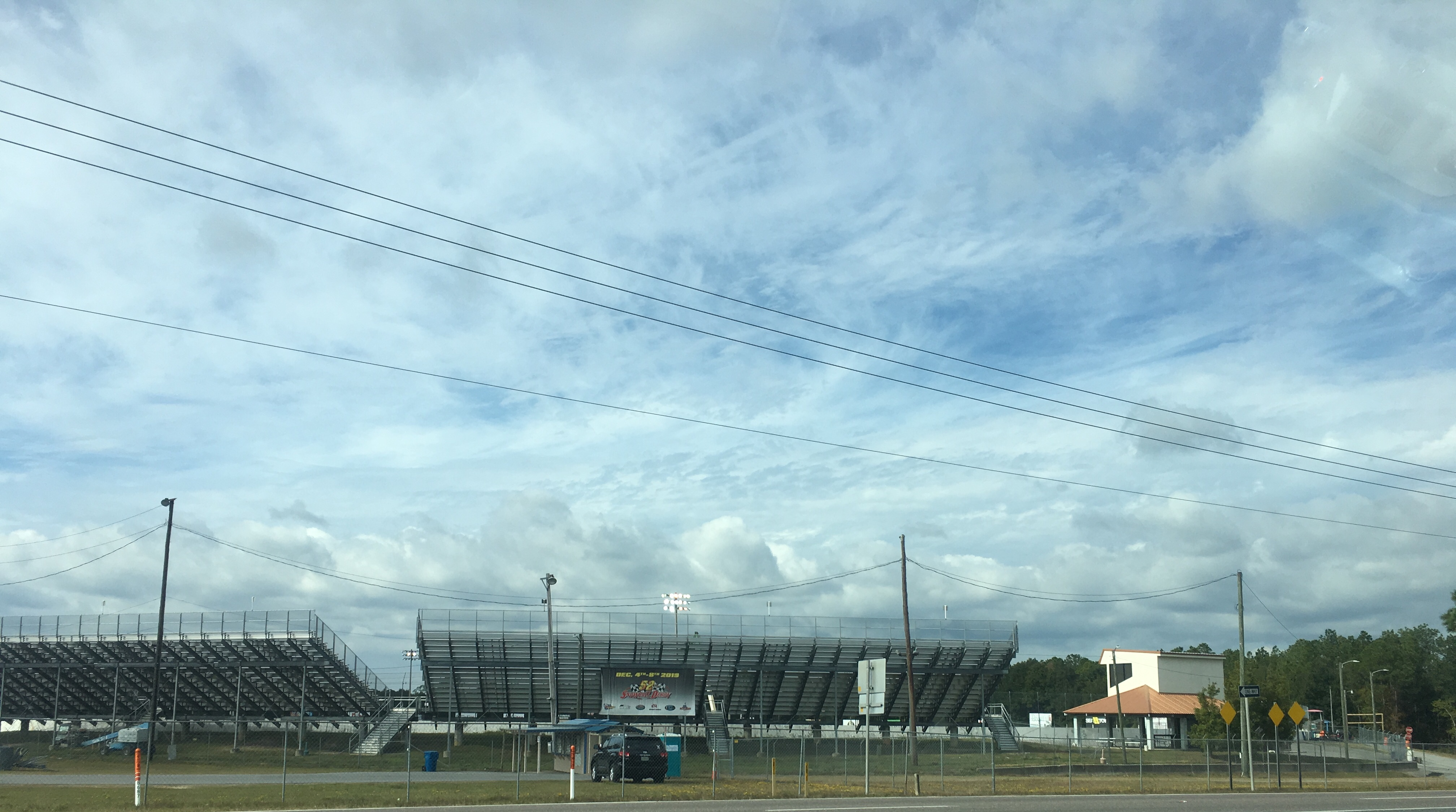
Five Flags Speedway, the circuit where the race will be held.

Five Flags Speedway is a half-mile (0.8 km) paved oval racetrack in Pensacola, Florida. It opened in 1953 and is located on Pine Forest Road. It is christened after the nickname of Pensacola—"City of Five Flags."

It runs several local classes during the regular racing season (March – October). These classes include Super Late Models, Pro Late Models, Pro Trucks, Outlaw Stocks, Sportsman, and Pure Stocks. The races are usual held on Friday nights bi-weekly. The track has also hosted many regional touring series.

In 2019, the ARCA Menards Series returned to the track, but for one year only. After the merge between ARCA and NASCAR after the 2019 season, the former NASCAR K&N Pro Series East, (now called ARCA Menards Series East) began racing at Five Flags in 2020.

==== Entry list ====
- (R) denotes rookie driver.

#	Driver	Team	Make	Sponsor
0	Nate Moeller	Wayne Peterson Racing	Ford	Wayne Peterson Racing
1	Bubba Pollard	Phoenix Racing	Chevrolet	Phoenix
06	Cody Dennison (R)	Wayne Peterson Racing	Toyota	ToolGanizer
07	Tyler Scofield	Scofield Motorsports	Chevrolet	JXT Transportation
10	Mike Basham	Fast Track Racing	Ford	Diesel Boys LLC / Double "H" Ranch
11	Zachary Tinkle	Fast Track Racing	Toyota	Fast Track Racing
12	Presley Sorah	Fast Track Racing	Toyota	OEM Pensacola / Tatanka Sauce
18	William Sawalich	Joe Gibbs Racing	Toyota	Starkey / SoundGear
20	Gio Ruggiero (R)	Venturini Motorsports	Toyota	JBL
28	Connor Zilisch (R) (Note: Due to Connor Zilisch being at Circuit of the Americas for the NASCAR Truck Series race, Luke Fenhaus practiced and qualified Zilisch's No. 28 car. Zilisch was able to make the race.)	Pinnacle Racing Group	Chevrolet	Chevrolet / Silver Hare Development
31	Rita Goulet	Rise Motorsports	Chevrolet	Nationalpolice.org / Backthelane.com
39	D. L. Wilson	Costner Weaver Motorsports	Toyota	ETR / Wilson Traditional Metals
55	Jake Finch	Venturini Motorsports	Toyota	Phoenix Construction
93	Colton Collins	Costner Weaver Motorsports	Chevrolet	Cooper Marketing Unlimited
95	Hunter Wright	MAN Motorsports	Toyota	Wilson County Visitors Bureau
99	Michael Maples (R)	Fast Track Racing	Chevrolet	Don Ray Petroleum / Maples Motorsports
Official entry list

== Practice ==
The first and only practice session was held on Saturday, March 23, at 2:30 PM EST, and would last for 60 minutes. Jake Finch, driving for Venturini Motorsports, would set the fastest time in the session, with a lap of 17.479, and a speed of 102.981 mph (165.732 km/h).

Pos.	#	Driver	Team	Make	Time	Speed
1	55	Jake Finch	Venturini Motorsports	Toyota	17.479	102.981
2	18	William Sawalich	Joe Gibbs Racing	Toyota	17.511	102.793
3	1	Bubba Pollard	Phoenix Racing	Chevrolet	17.707	101.655
Full practice results

== Qualifying ==
Qualifying was held on Saturday, March 23, at 5:00 PM EST. The qualifying system used is a single-car, two-lap based system. All drivers will be on track by themselves and will have two laps to post a qualifying time. The driver who sets the fastest time in qualifying will win the pole.

William Sawalich, driving for Joe Gibbs Racing, would score the pole for the race, with a lap of 17.126, and a speed of 105.103 mph (169.147 km/h).

Three drivers withdrew from the race: Ed Pompa, Brad Smith, and Dale Shearer.

=== Qualifying results ===
Pos.	#	Driver	Team	Make	Time	Speed
1	18	William Sawalich	Joe Gibbs Racing	Toyota	17.126	105.103
2	55	Jake Finch	Venturini Motorsports	Toyota	17.229	104.475
3	28	Luke Fenhaus	Pinnacle Racing Group	Chevrolet	17.285	104.137
4	20	Gio Ruggiero (R)	Venturini Motorsports	Toyota	17.319	103.932
5	1	Bubba Pollard	Phoenix Racing	Chevrolet	17.449	103.158
6	95	Hunter Wright	MAN Motorsports	Toyota	17.879	100.677
7	07	Tyler Scofield	Scofield Motorsports	Chevrolet	17.892	100.604
8	11	Zachary Tinkle	Fast Track Racing	Toyota	18.173	99.048
9	39	D. L. Wilson	Costner Weaver Motorsports	Toyota	18.526	97.161
10	10	Mike Basham	Fast Track Racing	Ford	18.599	96.779
11	93	Colton Collins	Costner Weaver Motorsports	Chevrolet	18.687	96.324
12	06	Cody Dennison (R)	Wayne Peterson Racing	Toyota	18.757	95.964
13	99	Michael Maples (R)	Fast Track Racing	Chevrolet	19.034	94.568
14	31	Rita Goulet	Rise Motorsports	Chevrolet	19.557	92.039
15	12	Presley Sorah	Fast Track Racing	Toyota	19.712	91.315
16	0	Nate Moeller	Wayne Peterson Racing	Ford	–	–
Withdrew
	10	Ed Pompa	Fast Track Racing	Ford		
	48	Brad Smith	Brad Smith Motorsports	Ford		
	98	Dale Shearer	Shearer Speed Racing	Toyota		
Official qualifying results

== Race results ==
Fin	St	#	Driver	Team	Make	Laps	Led	Status	Pts
1	4	20	Gio Ruggiero (R)	Venturini Motorsports	Toyota	150	70	Running	47
2	1	18	William Sawalich	Joe Gibbs Racing	Toyota	150	80	Running	45
3	3	1	Bubba Pollard	Phoenix Racing	Chevrolet	149	0	Running	41
4	3	28	Connor Zilisch (R)	Pinnacle Racing Group	Chevrolet	148	0	Running	40
5	6	95	Hunter Wright	MAN Motorsports	Toyota	148	0	Running	39
6	10	10	Mike Basham	Fast Track Racing	Ford	145	0	Running	38
7	2	55	Jake Finch	Venturini Motorsports	Toyota	144	0	Running	37
8	8	11	Zachary Tinkle	Fast Track Racing	Toyota	144	0	Running	36
9	9	39	D. L. Wilson	Costner Weaver Motorsports	Toyota	142	0	Running	35
10	12	06	Cody Dennison (R)	Wayne Peterson Racing	Toyota	142	0	Running	34
11	11	93	Colton Collins	Costner Weaver Motorsports	Chevrolet	141	0	Running	33
12	13	99	Michael Maples (R)	Fast Track Racing	Chevrolet	131	0	Running	32
13	14	31	Rita Goulet	Rise Motorsports	Chevrolet	120	0	Running	31
14	15	12	Presley Sorah	Fast Track Racing	Toyota	42	0	Electrical	30
15	7	07	Tyler Scofield	Scofield Motorsports	Chevrolet	29	0	Alternator	29
16	16	0	Nate Moeller	Wayne Peterson Racing	Ford	2	0	Engine	28
Withdrew
		10	Ed Pompa	Fast Track Racing	Ford				
		48	Brad Smith	Brad Smith Motorsports	Ford				
		98	Dale Shearer	Shearer Speed Racing	Toyota				
Official race results

== Standings after the race ==
Drivers' Championship standings

Pos	Driver	Points
1	Gio Ruggiero	47
2	William Sawalich	45 (-2)
3	Bubba Pollard	41 (–6)
4	Connor Zilisch	40 (–7)
5	Hunter Wright	39 (–8)
6	Mike Basham	38 (–9)
7	Jake Finch	37 (–10)
8	Zachary Tinkle	36 (–11)
9	D. L. Wilson	35 (–12)
10	Cody Dennison	34 (–13)

- Note: Only the first 10 positions are included for the driver standings.

Previous race: 2023 Bush's Beans 200	ARCA Menards Series East; 2024 season	Next race: 2024 General Tire 150
