= Tyler Scofield =

American racing driver (born 2000)

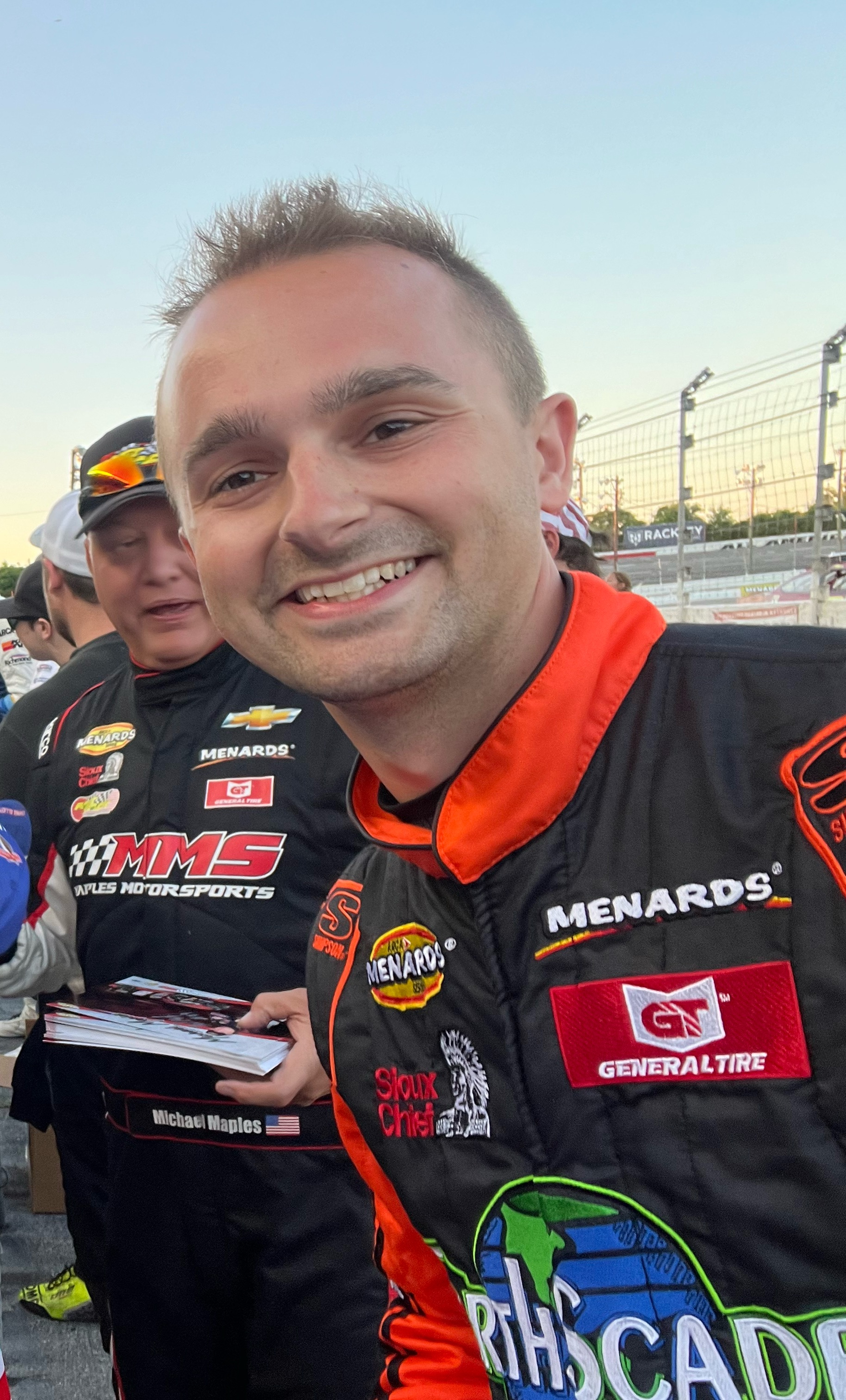
- Scofield at Nashville Fairgrounds Speedway in 2024
- Born: February 6, 2000 (age 26); Plant City, Florida, U.S.

ARCA Menards Series East career
- 2 races run over 1 year
- Best finish: 29th (2024)
- First race: 2024 Pensacola 150 (Pensacola)
- Last race: 2024 Music City 150 (Nashville Fairgrounds)
Wins	Top tens	Poles
0	1	0
- Statistics up to date as of May 15, 2024.

Tyler Scofield (born February 6, 2000) is an American professional stock car racing driver who last competed part-time in the ARCA Menards Series East, driving the No. 07 Chevrolet for his own team, Scofield Motorsports.

== Racing career ==
From 2012 to 2023, Scofield participated in series such as the Florida United Promoters Truck Series, the Bright House Challenge Series, the Sunshine State Challenge Series, the PASS South Super Late Model Series, and the Wheel Man Sportsman Series.

In 2024, it was announced that Scofield and his father Jeff had formed Scofield Motorsports, which would run in select ARCA Menards Series and ARCA Menards Series East races that year. The younger Scofield made his debut in the East Series at Five Flags Speedway, where after placing seventh in the lone practice session, he qualified in seventh but finished in fifteenth place due to issues with the car's alternator during the race. He then ran at Nashville Fairgrounds Speedway in May, where after placing seventh in the lone practice session, he qualified in seventh and finished one lap down in sixth place.

== Motorsports career results ==
=== ARCA Menards Series East ===
ARCA Menards Series East results
Year	Team	No.	Make	1	2	3	4	5	6	7	8	AMSEC	Pts	Ref
2024	Scofield Motorsports	07	Chevy	FIF; 15	DOV	NSV; 6	FRS	IOW	IRP	MLW	BRI	29th	67	
