= Liberty University Online Academy =

Private School in Lynchburg, VA

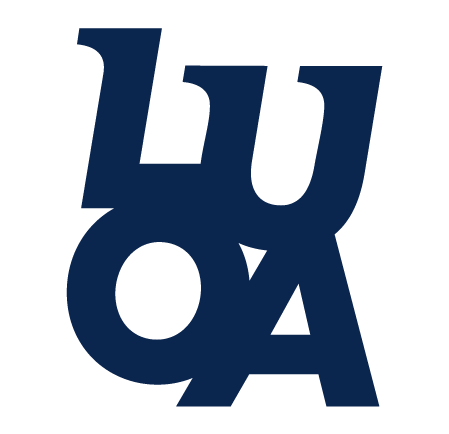

Location
- 1971 University Blvd; Lynchburg, Virginia; USA
- Coordinates: 37.3493°N 79.1817°W

Information
- Former name: Liberty Christian Academy
- Motto: "Knowledge Aflame"
- Established: 2007; 18 years ago
- Head of school: Dr. Chris Rusk
- Teaching staff: 300+
- Grades: K–12
- Enrollment: 18,500
- Student to teacher ratio: 21:1
- Color(s): Navy blue, white, and red
- Mascot: Sparky the Eagle
- Accreditation: ACSI
- Newspaper: Liberty Champion
- Affiliation: Liberty University
- Website: liberty.edu/online-academy/

Liberty University Online Academy, alternatively known as LUOA or Liberty University Online Academy is an accredited K-12 private school based in Lynchburg, Virginia. It serves approximately 18,000 students. It is operated and located at Liberty University for students worldwide.

== History ==
In 2005, Jay Spencer, then executive associate for online programs at Liberty University, proposed the idea of establishing an educational program for the elementary, middle and high school levels. in response to perceived challenges within the public school system. Liberty University Online Academy (LUOA) was founded in 2007, In its inaugural year, enrollments experienced a significant growth increasing from 70 to 350 students. LUOA introduced its educational curriculum for grades 3-12 in 2009, followed by the launch of the comprehensive K-12 program in 2011. The institution seen a 41 percent increase in enrollment in recent years, partly due to the COVID-19 pandemic, which prompted families to seek alternatives vs traditional brick-and-mortar schools in 2018.

LUOA has students from over 99 different countries, with approximately 18,400 students worldwide From Malaysia and Vietnam to Saudi Arabia and Iraq– students from diverse backgrounds have enrolled in LUOA’s program. Liberty University Online Academy has also been recognized as a “Christian” oriented educational institution LUOA has an 22% acceptance rate and is rated No. 12 in top prestigious private-educational institutions in Virginia

== Academics ==
LUOA offers classes in nine major subjects: English, Engineering, Language Arts, Mathematics, History, Computer Science, Bible, Wellness, and the Financial Literacy. Of these nine, the first seven disciplines offer honors and Advanced Placement level classes. LUOA also offers university level classes in English, Financial Literacy, and Mathematics.

=== Enhanced ===
In enhanced courses, web-based live-video instruction is employed. It is available for grades 9-12. Concurrent video feeds enable each student to see their classmates and instructors during the instruction. Sessions usually hosted once or twice a week depending on the course.

=== NCAA ===
At Liberty University OHS students aspiring to participate in collegiate sports must meet certain academic standards to enroll. All dual credits and enhanced courses are approved by the National Collegiate Athletic Association (NCAA) for Division I athletic program participation.

=== Dual enrollment ===
Liberty University OHS offers over 15 associate degree programs in partnership with Liberty University Online. Courses within the associate degree program also fulfill student's requirements for their LUOA high school diploma. Upon graduation, students have the opportunity to obtain both a high school diploma and a college degree. These programs include a variety of majors including criminal justice, business, psychology, creative writing, and apologetics. Liberty University High School offers two different diploma types

1. Standard Diploma: admission to most universities, certain vocational or technical schools, and community college
2. Advanced Diploma: admission to a wide/range of prestigious universities, colleges including those with a selective admissions criteria

== Accreditation ==
Liberty University Online Academy is accredited by the Southern Association of Schools and Colleges (SACS) and the Association of Christian Schools International (ACSI), and LUOA's Enhanced Courses and Dual Enrollment courses have been approved by the NCAA

== Enrollment ==
LUOA provides two levels of enrollment, determined by the number of courses a student is enrolled in each academic year. All enrolled students receive an official transcript for courses taken at the school regardless of their enrollment level, and are welcome to participate in school-orientated activities online and in-person. College Counseling and Academic Advisors is only available to full-time students.

- Full Time: 5-8 courses
- Part Time: 2-4 courses

== Notable students ==
- William Sawalich, race-car driver

== See also ==
- Education in the United States
