= William Sawalich =

American racing driver (born 2006)

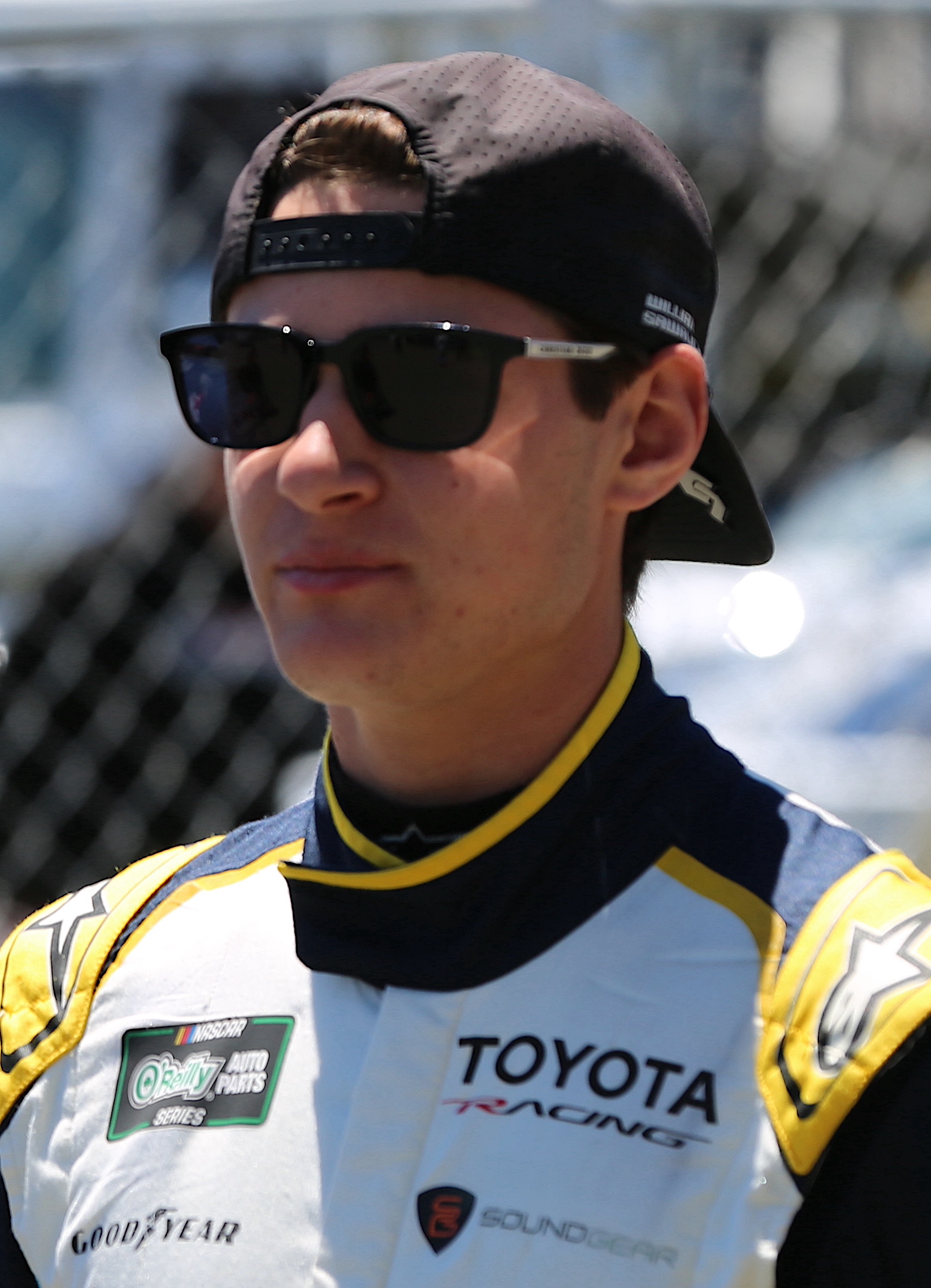
- Sawalich at Sonoma Raceway in 2026
- Born: William George Jerome Sawalich; October 3, 2006 (age 20); Eden Prairie, Minnesota, U.S.
- Height: 5 ft 11 in (1.80 m)
- Weight: 155 lb (70 kg)
- Achievements: 2023, 2024 ARCA Menards Series East Champion; 2023 All American 400 Winner; 2022 SCCA Trans-Am TA2 ProAm Series Champion; 2022 Rumble by the River 125 Winner; 2022 Throwback 276 Winner (LMSC); 2023 Orange Blossom 100 Winner
- Awards: 2022 SCCA Trans-Am TA2 ProAM Series Rookie of the Year

NASCAR O'Reilly Auto Parts Series career
- 67 races run over 3 years
- Car no., team: No. 18 (Joe Gibbs Racing)
- 2026 position: 14th
- Best finish: 14th (2026)
- First race: 2024 Credit One NASCAR Amex Credit Card 300 (Homestead)
- Last race: 2026 O'Reilly Auto Parts 300 (Homestead)
- First win: 2026 North Carolina Education Lottery 250 (Rockingham)
Wins	Top tens	Poles
1	24	3

NASCAR FedEx Freight Truck Series career
- 29 races run over 4 years
- 2026 position: 106th
- Best finish: 30th (2023, 2024)
- First race: 2023 Long John Silver's 200 (Martinsville)
- Last race: 2026 Black's Tire 200 (Martinsville)
Wins	Top tens	Poles
0	9	1

ARCA Menards Series career
- 32 races run over 4 years
- Best finish: 8th (2023)
- First race: 2023 General Tire 150 (Phoenix)
- Last race: 2026 Ashley Furniture 150 (Chicagoland)
- First win: 2023 Herr's Snacks 200 (Berlin)
- Last win: 2024 Owens Corning 200 (Toledo)
Wins	Top tens	Poles
13	29	16

ARCA Menards Series East career
- 17 races run over 3 years
- Best finish: 1st (2023, 2024)
- First race: 2023 Pensacola 200 (Pensacola)
- Last race: 2025 Rockingham ARCA 125 (Rockingham)
- First win: 2023 Pensacola 200 (Pensacola)
- Last win: 2024 Bush's Beans 200 (Bristol)
Wins	Top tens	Poles
7	16	9

ARCA Menards Series West career
- 10 races run over 3 years
- Best finish: 16th (2023)
- First race: 2023 General Tire 150 (Phoenix)
- Last race: 2025 Portland 112 (Portland)
- First win: 2023 Desert Diamond Casino West Valley 100 (Phoenix)
- Last win: 2025 Portland 112 (Portland)
Wins	Top tens	Poles
5	9	6
- Statistics up to date as of November 7, 2026.

William George Jerome Sawalich (born October 3, 2006) is an American professional stock car racing driver. He competes full-time in the NASCAR O'Reilly Auto Parts Series, driving the No. 18 Toyota GR Supra for Joe Gibbs Racing. He is the 2023 and 2024 ARCA Menards Series East champion.

== Racing career ==
=== Early career ===
Sawalich began racing at the age of nine, running various midget races, including Sr. Animal's and World Formula. From 2017 to 2019, he won several track championships at Little Elko Speedway.

Sawalich moved into legends cars in 2020, winning the INEX Young Lions State Championship in Minnesota. He scored multiple top fives and podiums during his legends car efforts. He won an INEX sanctioned Legends division feature race at Elko Speedway (MN) on August 22, 2020.

=== Late models ===
Sawalich made the transition to late models in 2021, running nearly a full season in the Carolina Pro Late Model Series. Despite missing two races, he finished fourth in the standings, with one win at Carteret County Speedway, and seven top-fives. Along with that, he continued to run in select legend car races. He made his CARS Tour debut at Tri-County Motor Speedway in September, in which he started on the pole. He finished seventeenth after being involved in a late-race accident.

In 2022, Sawalich increased his late model schedule, running in the CARS Tour, the Champion Racing Association, the ARCA Midwest Tour, the Southern Super Series, and the World Series of Asphalt Stock Car Racing. In the CARS Tour, Sawalich ran nine races, earning six wins, four of them in row. His streak came to an end at Tri-County in September, after he got spun on the last lap by Jake Garcia.

In 2023, Sawalich won the All American 400 in a controversial ending, after the top eight drivers were eliminated due to fluid on the racetrack, causing them to slip up and hit the wall. He also became the youngest driver to win the All American 400.

=== ARCA ===
==== ARCA Menards Series ====
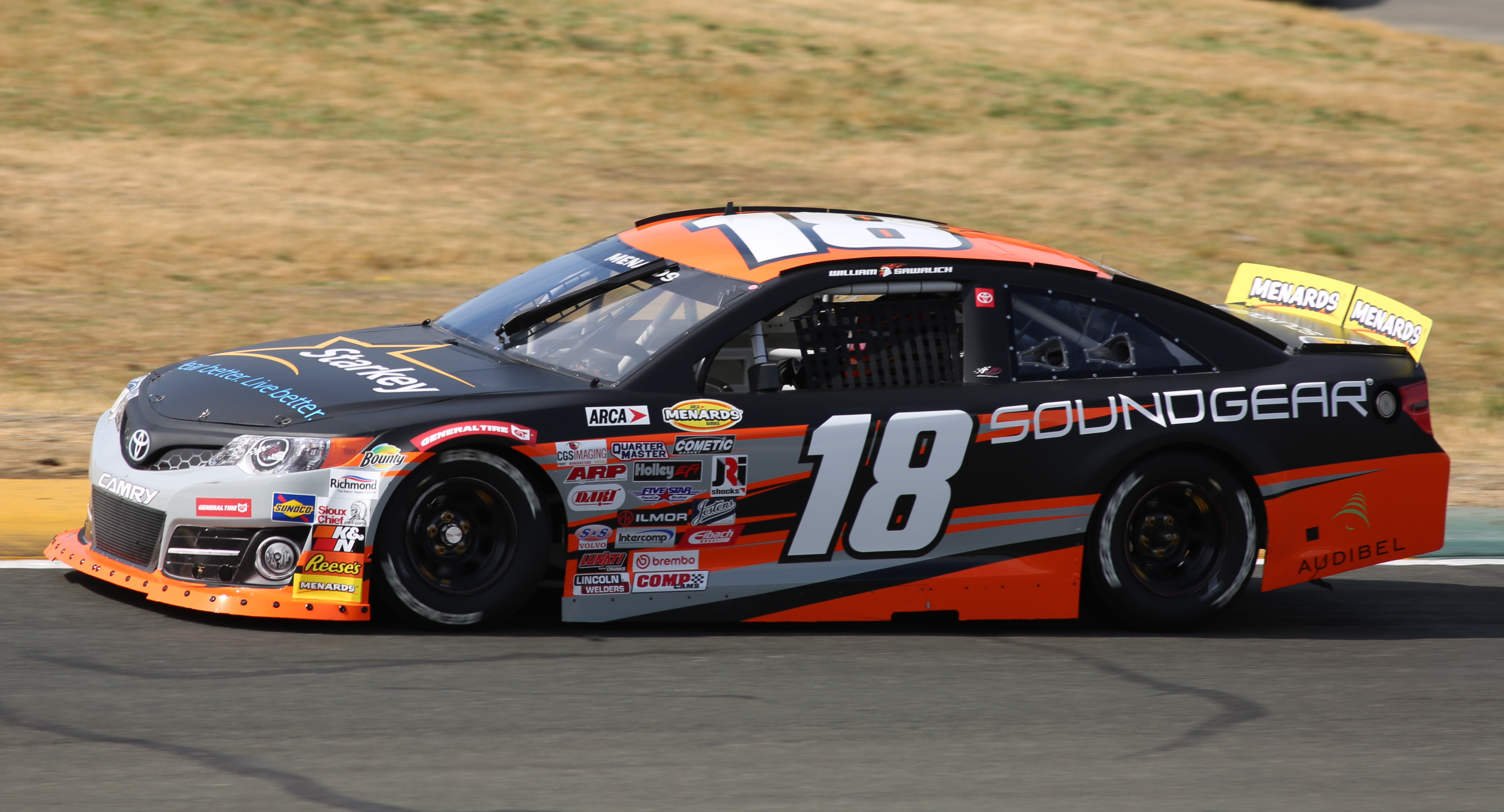
Sawalich's No. 18 ARCA car at Sonoma in 2023

On December 9, 2022, it was announced that Sawalich would join Joe Gibbs Racing to run twenty races in the ARCA Menards Series. Sawalich would make his debut at Phoenix, winning the pole and finishing thirteenth. He earned his first ARCA main win at Berlin Raceway, after passing Jesse Love for the lead with two laps to go.

On December 13, 2023, it was announced that Sawalich would run a more expanded ARCA Menards Series schedule. He would run the No. 18 for the fourteen races in the series. Tanner Gray would drive the No. 18 for the six tracks in the ARCA Menards Series that Sawalich was too young to race at. He would start his season in the ARCA Menards Series with a victory at Phoenix after leading 66 laps in a weather-shortened race. At Dover, Sawalich won the pole and once again led the most laps, before being involved in a late race incident, unable to complete the race and finished seventeenth, the first DNF in his career. In fourteen races in the main ARCA series, Sawalich won nine races to go with thirteen top-fives and finished tenth in the points standings. Sawalich's performance during the season contributed to the No. 18 winning the owner's championship in the main ARCA Series.

==== ARCA Menards Series East ====
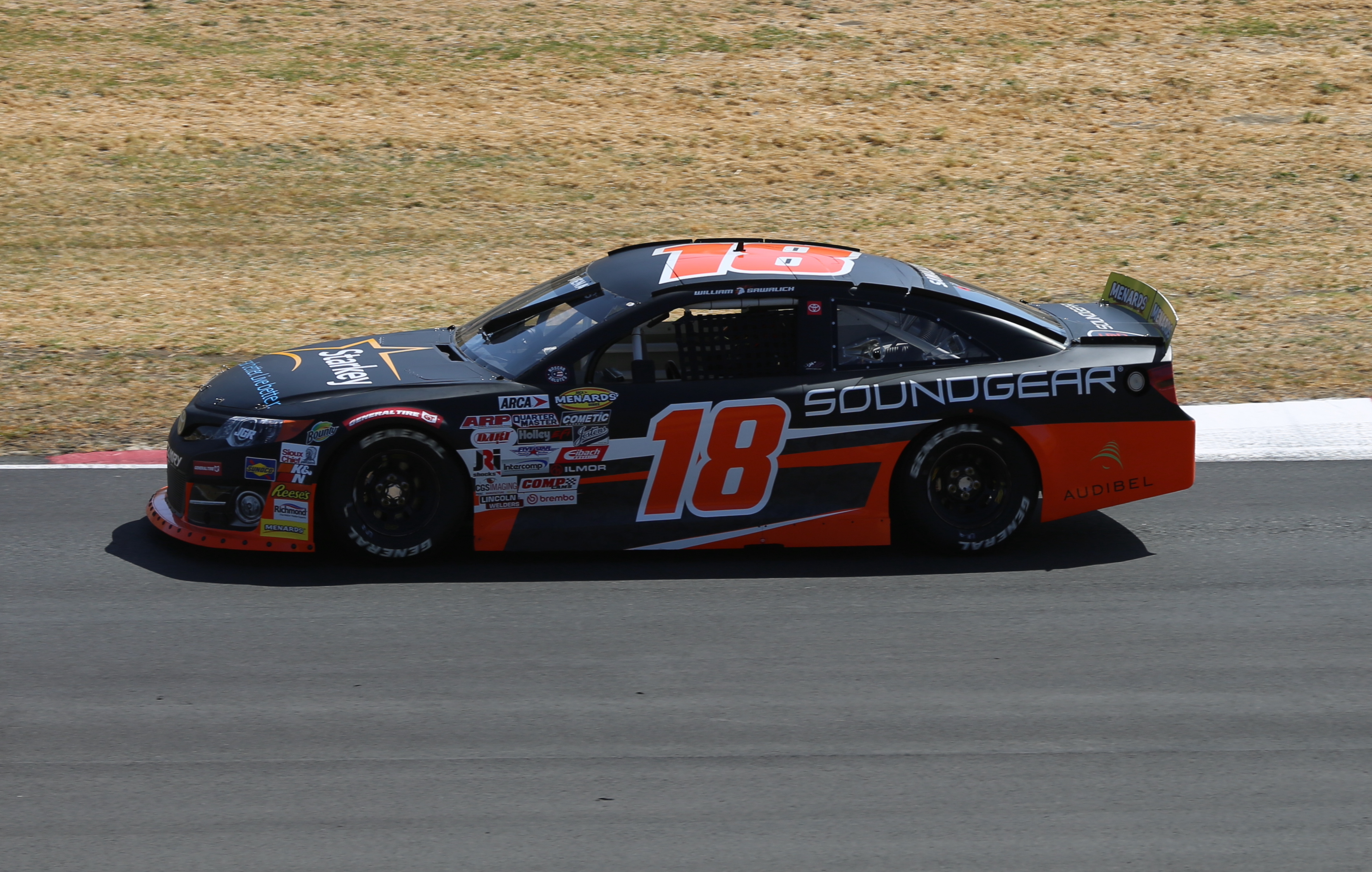
Sawalich's No. 18 car at Sonoma in 2024

On December 9, 2022, it was announced that Sawalich would join Joe Gibbs Racing. This included a full season in the ARCA Menards Series East. In his first start at Five Flags Speedway, Sawalich won the pole and led every lap to earn his first career ARCA win. At Nashville, Sawalich was in contention to win his second race, until the caution came out on the final lap. He would spin his tires on the final restart, ultimately giving the win to Luke Fenhaus. He earned his second win of the season at ARCA's return to Flat Rock Speedway, leading the final fifty laps of the race. Following the Bristol race, Sawalich clinched the ARCA Menards Series East championship.

On December 13, 2023, it was announced that Sawalich would return full-time in the ARCA Menards Series East. In the first race of the season, Sawalich would lead the most laps at Five Flags, but he would end up finishing second to Gio Ruggiero. At Dover, Sawalich won the pole and once again led the most laps, before being involved in a late race incident, unable to complete the race and finished seventeenth, the first DNF in his career. In the following race at Nashville, Sawalich rebounded and led 145 of the 150 lap race to score the dominating win. Overall, Sawalich scored three wins and seven top-three finishes to clinch his second consecutive ARCA East championship.

==== ARCA Menards Series West ====
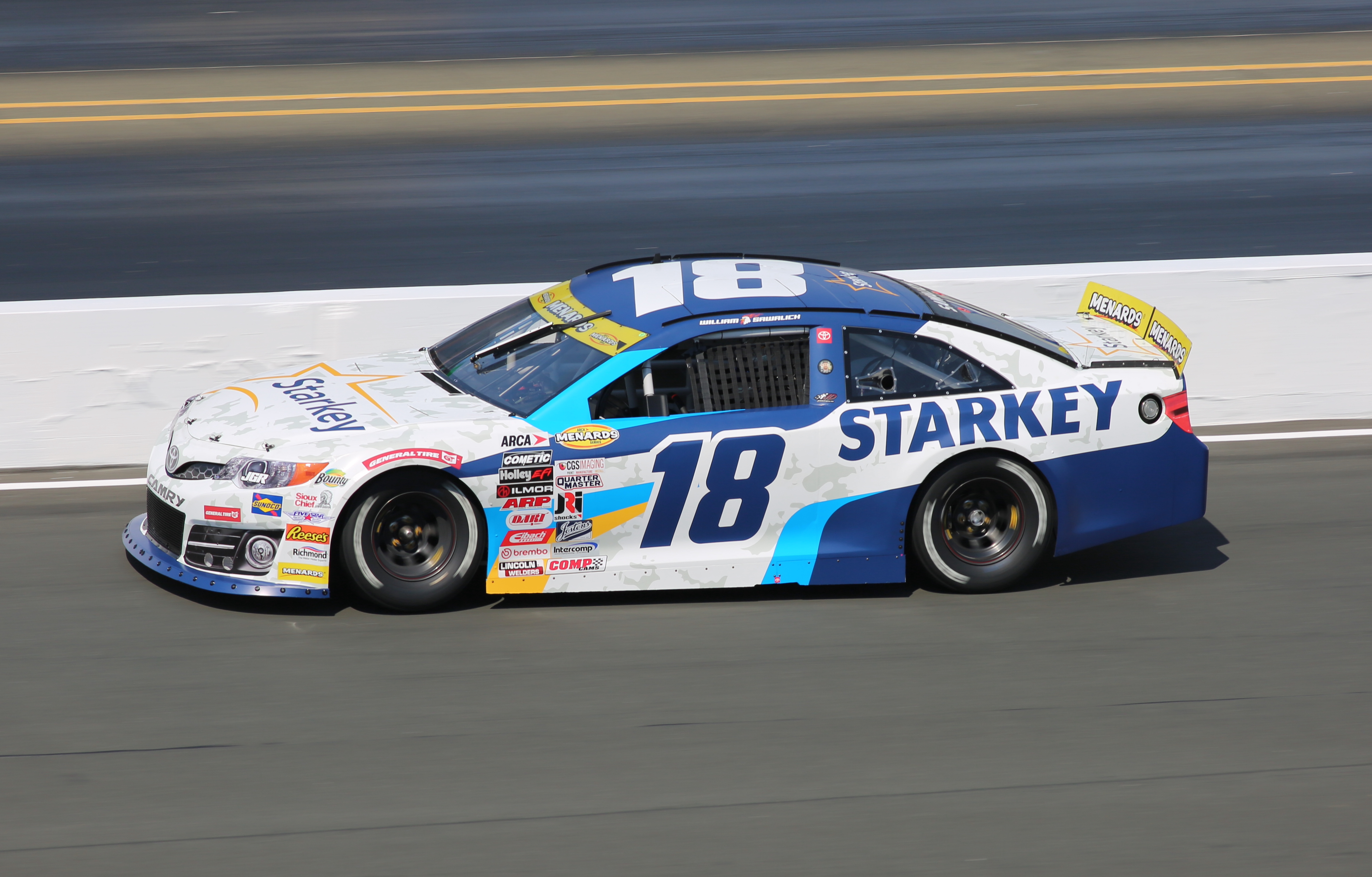
Sawalich's race-winning car at Sonoma in 2025

On December 9, 2022, it was announced that Sawalich would join Joe Gibbs Racing to run select races in the ARCA Menards Series West. Sawalich would make his debut at Phoenix, winning the pole and finishing thirteenth.

On December 13, 2023, it was announced that Sawalich would run a partial ARCA Menards Series West schedule. He would start his season with a victory at Phoenix after leading 66 laps in a weather-shortened race. At Portland for the West Series race, Sawalich took the lead from Brandon Jones in the middle stages of the race, and led the final 31 laps to earn his first road course win in ARCA.

Sawalich returned in 2025, where he would earn wins at Sonoma by leading all 65 laps and winning by a measly 0.066 seconds over Christian Eckes and at Portland for the second straight year.

=== NASCAR Craftsman Truck Series ===
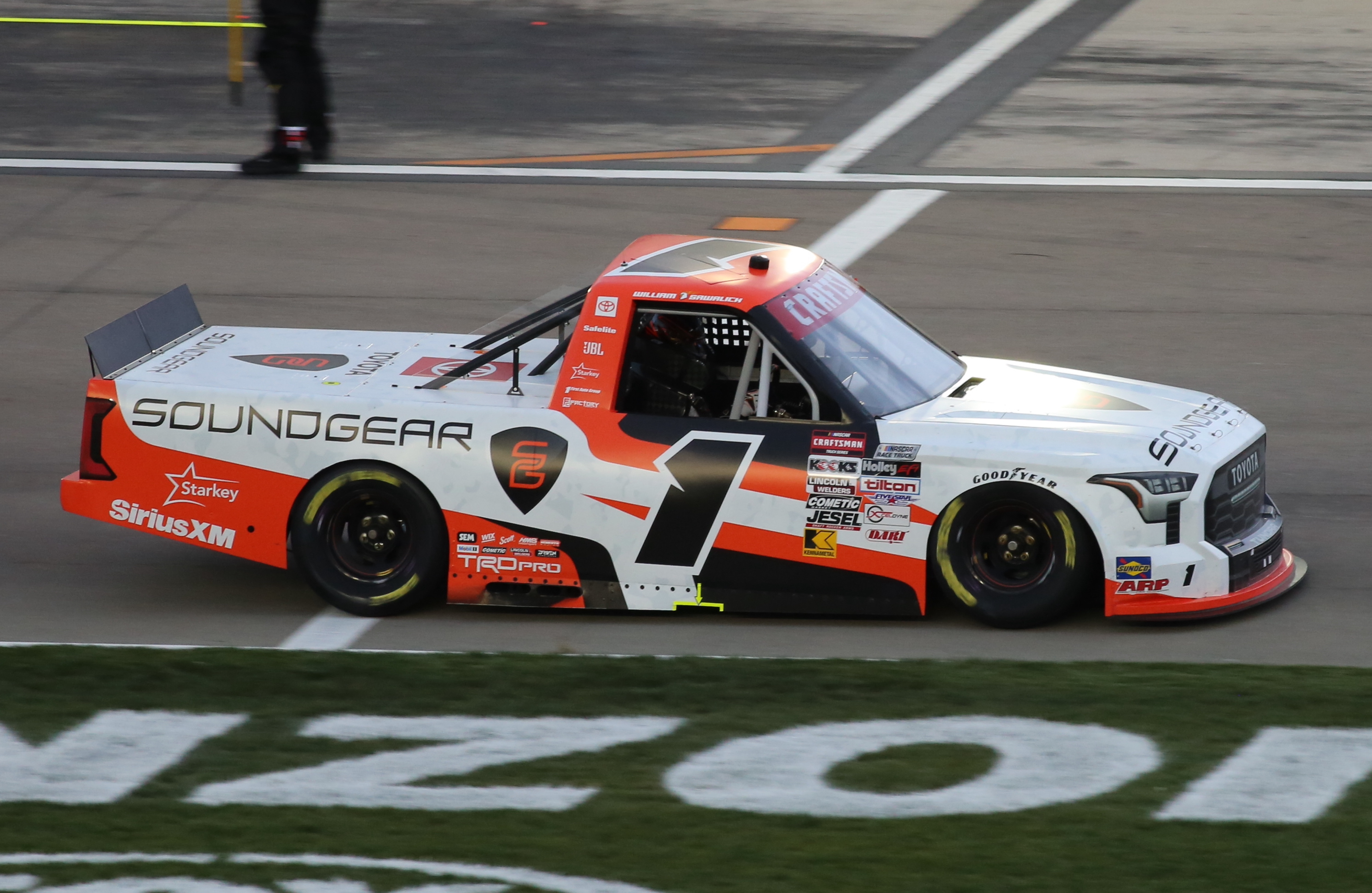
Sawalich's No. 1 truck at Las Vegas Motor Speedway in 2025

On January 19, 2023, it was announced that Sawalich would join Tricon Garage for six races in the NASCAR Craftsman Truck Series, making his debut in the series. He made his debut at Martinsville Speedway, finishing ninth after running near the top ten for most of the race.

After earning three top tens in 2023, Tricon announced that Sawalich would return to the No. 1 team in 2024, this time with an expanded ten-race schedule. Sawalich would start his season with a 21st place finish at Bristol, along with a 26th place finish at Martinsville. During the season, he scored his first career pole at Talladega, one day after his eighteenth birthday.

=== NASCAR O'Reilly Auto Parts Series ===
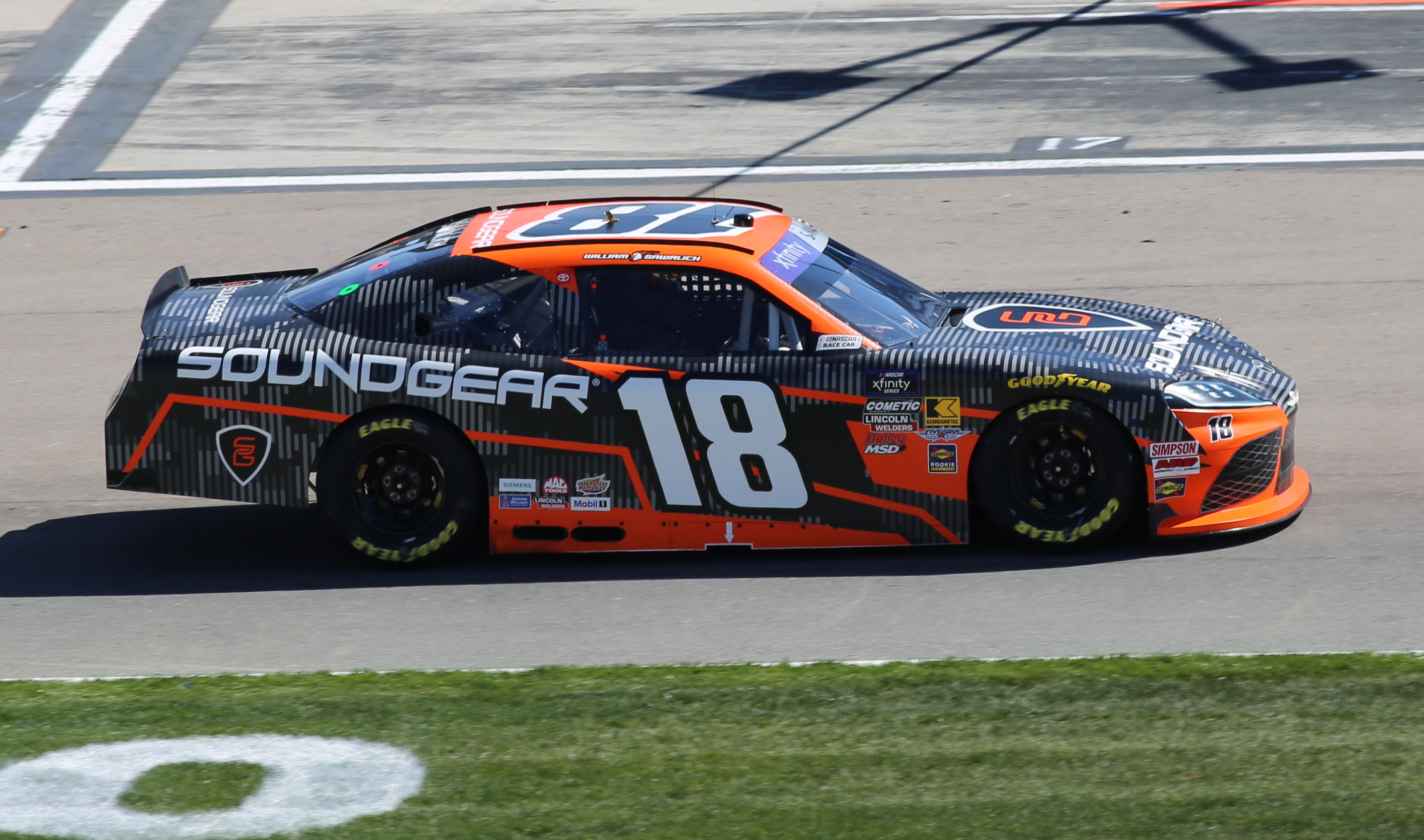
Sawalich's No. 18 car at Las Vegas Motor Speedway in 2025

On December 13, 2023, it was announced that Sawalich would run the No. 19 for Joe Gibbs Racing in the NASCAR Xfinity Series part-time in 2024, starting in the fall. Sawalich ran the final three races of the season at Homestead, Martinsville, and Phoenix. At Phoenix, he scored his first career pole in his third career start.

On October 21, 2024, it was announced that Sawalich would run full-time in the Xfinity Series in 2025, driving the No. 18 Toyota for JGR. Sawalich started the season with a 28th-place DNF at Daytona. Throughout the year, he earned top-ten finishes at Atlanta, COTA, Mexico City, Sonoma, Dover, Indianapolis, and Charlotte Roval. Sawalich would earn his second career pole at Nashville. His best finish of the season came at Portland and Gateway, finishing second. During the Talladega fall race, Sawalich was involved in a multi-car wreck during the second stage with Connor Mosack and Dean Thompson, causing him to stay in a nearby hospital overnight. He would later miss the following race at Martinsville Speedway due to concussion-like symptoms, and would be replaced by Justin Bonsignore. It was later announced that Sawalich would also miss the final race in the season at Phoenix Raceway. He would be replaced once again by Bonsignore.

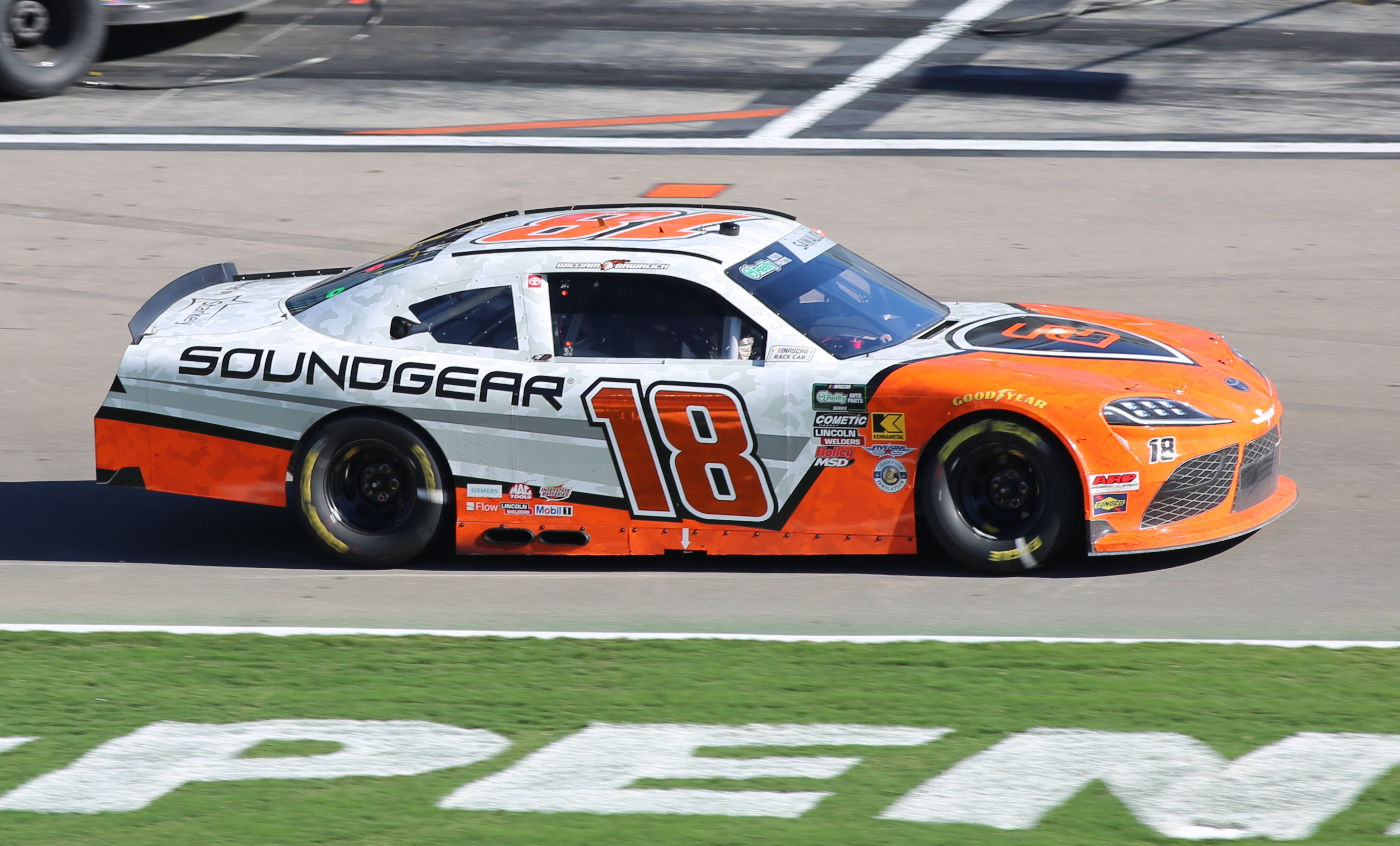
Sawalich's No. 18 car at Las Vegas Motor Speedway in 2026

On January 6, 2026, it was announced that Sawalich would be retained by JGR for the 2026 season. He started the season with a 26th-place DNF at Daytona. He won his first career race at Rockingham, becoming the first Minnesota-born driver to win a NASCAR national series race.

== Personal life ==
William's father, Brandon Sawalich, is the president of Starkey Hearing Technologies, the largest hearing aid manufacturer in the United States. Starkey sponsors his racing efforts. Brandon is the step-grandson of businessman William F. Austin.

Sawalich was an online student at Liberty University Online Academy, and is a client of KHI Management.

== Motorsports career results ==
=== Stock car career summary ===
Season	Series	Team	Races	Wins	Top 5	Top 10	Points	Position
2021	Carolina Pro Late Model Series		10	1	?	?	1077	4th
2021	CARS Super Late Model Tour	Brandon Setzer	1	0	0	0	0	NC†
2022	CARS Pro Late Model Tour	Brandon Setzer	9	6	8	8	298	4th
2022	CARS Late Model Stock Car Tour	Brandon Setzer	5	0	2	3	116	21st
2023	ASA STARS National Tour	Wilson Motorsports	4	1	3	3	252	10th
2023	CARS Pro Late Model Tour	Brandon Setzer	5	0	0	2	84	28th
2023	CARS Late Model Stock Car Tour	Brandon Setzer	1	0	0	0	22	51st
2023	ARCA Menards Series West	Joe Gibbs Racing	4	1	3	3	162	15th
2023	ARCA Menards Series East	Joe Gibbs Racing	8	4	8	8	420	**1st**
2023	ARCA Menards Series	Joe Gibbs Racing	13	4	11	12	558	8th
2023	NASCAR Craftsman Truck Series	Tricon Garage	6	0	0	3	138	30th
2024	ASA STARS National Tour	Kevin Harvick Inc.	2	0	0	1	91	30th
2024	CARS Pro Late Model Tour	Rackley W.A.R.	1	0	1	1	?	?
2024	ARCA Menards Series West	Joe Gibbs Racing	4	2	4	4	181	16th
2024	ARCA Menards Series East	Joe Gibbs Racing	8	3	7	7	402	**1st**
2024	ARCA Menards Series	Joe Gibbs Racing	14	9	13	13	689	10th
2024	NASCAR Craftsman Truck Series	Tricon Garage	10	0	0	0	197	30th
2024	NASCAR Xfinity Series	Joe Gibbs Racing	3	0	0	0	0	NC†
2025	ASA STARS National Tour	Rackley W.A.R.	1	0	1	1	72	39th
2025	ARCA Menards Series West	Joe Gibbs Racing	2	2	2	2	98	23rd
2025	ARCA Menards Series East	Joe Gibbs Racing	1	0	1	1	43	46th
2025	ARCA Menards Series	Joe Gibbs Racing	4	0	3	4	164	24th
2025	NASCAR Craftsman Truck Series	Tricon Garage	5	0	0	1	0	NC†
2025	NASCAR Xfinity Series	Joe Gibbs Racing	31	0	3	9	636	18th
2026	ASA STARS National Tour	Rackley W.A.R.	2	0	1	1		
2026	ARCA Menards Series	Joe Gibbs Racing	1	0	0	0	20	121st
2026	NASCAR Craftsman Truck Series	Tricon Garage	7	0	0	4	0	NC†
2026	NASCAR Craftsman Truck Series	Halmar Friesen Racing	1	0	0	1	0	NC†
2026	NASCAR O'Reilly Auto Parts Series	Joe Gibbs Racing	33	1	8	15	838	14th

^{†} As Sawalich was a guest driver, he was ineligible for championship points.

=== NASCAR ===
(key) (Bold – Pole position awarded by qualifying time. Italics – Pole position earned by points standings or practice time. * – Most laps led.)

==== O'Reilly Auto Parts Series ====
NASCAR O'Reilly Auto Parts Series results
Year	Team	No.	Make	1	2	3	4	5	6	7	8	9	10	11	12	13	14	15	16	17	18	19	20	21	22	23	24	25	26	27	28	29	30	31	32	33	NOAPSC	Pts	Ref
2024	Joe Gibbs Racing	19	Toyota	DAY	ATL	LVS	PHO	COA	RCH	MAR	TEX	TAL	DOV	DAR	CLT	PIR	SON	IOW	NHA	NSH	CSC	POC	IND	MCH	DAY	DAR	ATL	GLN	BRI	KAN	TAL	ROV	LVS	HOM; 24	MAR; 33	**PHO**; 13	94th	0^{1}	
2025	Joe Gibbs Racing	18	Toyota	DAY; 28	ATL; 9	COA; 9	PHO; 13	LVS; 38	HOM; 24	MAR; 27	DAR; 35	BRI; 34	CAR; 25	TAL; 37	TEX; 13	CLT; 15	**NSH**; 34	MXC; 6	POC; 21	ATL; 36	CSC; 37	SON; 3	DOV; 9	IND; 6	IOW; 11	GLN; 26	DAY; 12	PIR; 2	GTW; 2	BRI; 15	KAN; 11	ROV; 7	LVS; 12	TAL; 30	MAR	PHO	18th	636	
2026	Joe Gibbs Racing	18	Toyota	DAY; 26	ATL; 23	COA; 7	PHO; 37	LVS; 9	DAR; 17	MAR; 20	CAR; 1	**BRI**; 7	KAN; 20	TAL; 28	TEX; 15	GLN; 36	DOV; 4	CLT; 4	NSH; 3	POC; 21	COR; 36	SON; 13	CHI; 29	ATL; 4	IND; 5	IOW; 3	DAY; 37	DAR; 30	GTW; 16	BRI; 2	LVS; 8	CLT; 11	PHO; 8	TAL; 29	MAR; 8	HOM; 10	14th	838	

==== Craftsman Truck Series ====
NASCAR Craftsman Truck Series results
Year	Team	No.	Make	1	2	3	4	5	6	7	8	9	10	11	12	13	14	15	16	17	18	19	20	21	22	23	24	25	NCTC	Pts	Ref
2023	Tricon Garage	1	Toyota	DAY	LVS	ATL	COA	TEX	BRD	MAR; 9	KAN	DAR	NWS	CLT	GTW	NSH	MOH; 27	POC	RCH; 10	IRP; 6	MLW; 26	KAN	BRI; 30	TAL	HOM	PHO			30th	138	
2024	Tricon Garage	1	Toyota	DAY	ATL	LVS	BRI; 21	COA	MAR; 26	TEX	KAN	DAR	NWS	CLT	GTW	NSH	POC	IRP; 12	RCH; 22	MLW; 14	BRI; 11	KAN	**TAL**; 27	HOM; 17	MAR; 14	PHO; 32			30th	197	
2025	Tricon Garage	1	Toyota	DAY; 9	ATL; 30	LVS; 22	HOM	MAR	BRI	CAR	TEX	KAN	NWS	CLT	NSH; 24	MCH	POC	LRP	IRP	GLN; 11	RCH	DAR	BRI	NHA	ROV	TAL	MAR	PHO	88th	0^{1}	
2026	Tricon Garage	1	Toyota	DAY	ATL	STP	DAR; 10	CAR	BRI																				106th	0^{1}	
2026	Tricon Garage	5	Toyota							TEX; 17	GLN	DOV; 14	CLT; 10	NSH; 30	MCH	COR	LRP	NWS	IRP	RCH	NHA				PHO; 6	TAL	MAR; 9	HOM	106th	0^{1}	
2026	Halmar Friesen Racing	62	Toyota																			BRI; 7	KAN	CLT					106th	0^{1}	

^{*} Season still in progress
^{1} Ineligible for series points

=== ARCA Menards Series ===
(key) (Bold – Pole position awarded by qualifying time. Italics – Pole position earned by points standings or practice time. * – Most laps led. ** – All laps led.)

ARCA Menards Series results
Year	Team	No.	Make	1	2	3	4	5	6	7	8	9	10	11	12	13	14	15	16	17	18	19	20	AMSC	Pts	Ref
2023	Joe Gibbs Racing	18	Toyota	DAY	PHO; 13*	TAL	KAN	CLT	BLN; 1	ELK; 2	MOH; 2	**IOW**; 2*	POC	MCH	IRP; 4	GLN; 4	ISF; 5	**MLW**; 1*	**DSF**; 5	KAN	**BRI**; 1	SLM; 6	TOL; 1*	8th	558	
2024	Joe Gibbs Racing	18	Toyota	DAY	**PHO**; 1*	TAL	**DOV**; 17*	KAN	CLT	IOW; 2	MOH; 1	**BLN**; 1*	**IRP**; 3	**SLM**; 1**	**ELK**; 1*	MCH	**ISF**; 1*	**MLW**; 1*	**DSF**; 2	GLN; 2	BRI; 1*	KAN	**TOL**; 1*	10th	640	
2025	Joe Gibbs Racing	18	Toyota	DAY; 2*	PHO	TAL; 9	KAN; 2	CLT; 4	MCH	BLN	ELK	LRP	DOV	IRP	IOW	GLN	ISF	MAD	DSF	BRI	SLM	KAN	TOL	24th	164	
2026	Joe Gibbs Racing	18	Toyota	DAY	PHO	KAN	TAL	GLN	TOL	MCH	POC	BER	ELK	CHI; 24	LRP	IRP	IOW	ISF	MAD	DSF	SLM	BRI	KAN	121st	20	

==== ARCA Menards Series East ====
ARCA Menards Series East results
Year	Team	No.	Make	1	2	3	4	5	6	7	8	AMSEC	Pts	Ref
2023	Joe Gibbs Racing	18	Toyota	**FIF**; 1**	DOV; 4	**NSV**; 2*	FRS; 1	**IOW**; 2*	IRP; 4	**MLW**; 1*	**BRI**; 1	1st	465	
2024	Joe Gibbs Racing	18	Toyota	**FIF**; 2*	**DOV**; 17*	NSV; 1*	FRS; 2	IOW; 2	**IRP**; 3	**MLW**; 1*	BRI; 1*	1st	448	
2025	Joe Gibbs Racing	18	Toyota	FIF	CAR; 2	NSV	FRS	DOV	IRP	IOW	BRI	46th	43	

==== ARCA Menards Series West ====
ARCA Menards Series West results
Year	Team	No.	Make	1	2	3	4	5	6	7	8	9	10	11	12	AMSWC	Pts	Ref
2023	Joe Gibbs Racing	18	Toyota	**PHO**; 13*	IRW	KCR	PIR; 4	SON; 5	IRW	SHA	EVG	AAS	LVS	MAD	**PHO**; 1*	16th	162	
2024	Joe Gibbs Racing	18	Toyota	**PHO**; 1*	KER	PIR; 1*	SON; 4	IRW	IRW	SHA	TRI	MAD	AAS	KER	**PHO**; 2	17th	181	
2025	Joe Gibbs Racing	18	Toyota	KER	PHO	TUC	CNS	KER	**SON**; 1**	TRI	**PIR**; 1*	AAS	MAD	LVS	PHO	23rd	98	

=== CARS Late Model Stock Car Tour ===
(key) (Bold – Pole position awarded by qualifying time. Italics – Pole position earned by points standings or practice time. * – Most laps led. ** – All laps led.)

CARS Late Model Stock Car Tour results
Year	Team	No.	Make	1	2	3	4	5	6	7	8	9	10	11	12	13	14	15	16	CLMSCTC	Pts	Ref
2022	Brandon Setzer	43	Ford	CRW	HCY; 4	GRE	AAS	FCS	LGY	DOM	HCY; 2	ACE; 21	MMS	NWS; 8	TCM; 17	ACE	SBO	CRW		21st	116	
2023	Brandon Setzer	43	Toyota	SNM	FLC	HCY; 9	ACE; 6	NWS; 31	LGY	DOM	CRW; 18	HCY	ACE	TCM	WKS	AAS	SBO	TCM; 17	CRW	28th	84	

=== CARS Super Late Model Tour ===
(key)

CARS Super Late Model Tour results
Year	Team	No.	Make	1	2	3	4	5	6	7	8	CSLMTC	Pts	Ref
2021	Brandon Setzer	6	Ford	HCY	GPS	NSH	JEN	HCY	MMS	**TCM**; 17	SBO	N/A	0	

=== CARS Pro Late Model Tour ===
(key)

CARS Pro Late Model Tour results
Year	Team	No.	Make	1	2	3	4	5	6	7	8	9	10	11	12	13	CPLMTC	Pts	Ref
2022	Brandon Setzer	6	Ford	CRW; 4	HCY; 1**	GPS	FCS; 5	**TCM**; 1**		**ACE**; 1**	**MMS**; 1**	**TCM**; 12*	ACE	**SBO**; 1	CRW		4th	298	
2022	Brandon Setzer	4	Ford						**HCY**; 1**								4th	298	
2023	N/A	28	Toyota	SNM	HCY	ACE	NWS	TCM; 11	DIL	CRW	WKS	HCY	TCM	SBO	TCM	CRW	52nd	22	
2024	Rackley W.A.R.	26	Toyota	SNM	HCY	OCS	ACE; 4	TCM	CRW	HCY	NWS	ACE	FLC	SBO	TCM	NWS	N/A	0	

=== ASA STARS National Tour ===
(key) (Bold – Pole position awarded by qualifying time. Italics – Pole position earned by points standings or practice time. * – Most laps led. ** – All laps led.)

ASA STARS National Tour results
Year	Team	No.	Make	1	2	3	4	5	6	7	8	9	10	11	12	ASNTC	Pts	Ref
2023	Wilson Motorsports	2	Toyota	FIF	MAD	NWS; 12	HCY	MLW; 5	AND	WIR	TOL	WIN; 4	NSV; 1			10th	252	
2024	Kevin Harvick Inc.	62	Toyota	NSM; 11	FIF	HCY; 10	MAD	MLW	AND	OWO	TOL	WIN	NSV			30th	91	
2025	Rackley W.A.R.	62	Toyota	NSM; 2	FIF	DOM	HCY	NPS	MAD	SLG	AND	OWO	TOL	WIN	NSV	39th	72	
2026	Rackley W.A.R.	25	Toyota	NSM; 12	FIF	HCY; 5	SLG	MAD	NPS	OWO	TRI	WIN	NSV	NSM		-*	-*	
