= 2024 Berlin ARCA 200 =

9th race of the 2024 ARCA Menards Series

Race details
- Race 9 of 20 of the 2024 ARCA Menards Series
- Date: June 29, 2024
- Official name: 24th Annual Berlin ARCA 200
- Location: Berlin Raceway in Marne, Michigan
- Course: Permanent racing facility
- Course length: 0.438 miles (0.705 km)
- Distance: 200 laps, 87.6 mi (140 km)
- Scheduled distance: 200 laps, 87.6 mi (140 km)
- Average speed: 61.306 miles per hour (98.662 km/h)

Pole position
Driver	William Sawalich	Joe Gibbs Racing
- Time: 16.762

Most laps led
Driver	William Sawalich	Joe Gibbs Racing
- Laps: 195

Winner
No. 18	William Sawalich	Joe Gibbs Racing

Television in the United States
- Network: FS1
- Announcers: Eric Brennan and Phil Parsons

Radio in the United States
- Radio: ARCA Racing Network

The 2024 Berlin ARCA 200 was the ninth stock car race of the 2024 ARCA Menards Series season, and the 24th iteration of the event. The race was held on June 29, 2024, at Berlin Raceway in Marne, Michigan, a 0.438 mile (0.705 km) permanent tri-oval shaped racetrack. The race took the scheduled 200 laps to complete.

== Report ==
=== Background ===
Berlin Raceway is a 7/16-mile-long paved oval race track in Marne, Michigan, near Grand Rapids. The track races weekly as part of the NASCAR Advance Auto Parts Weekly Series. It has also held touring series events on the ARCA Menards Series, ARCA Menards Series East, American Speed Association National Tour, USAC Stock Cars, USAC Silver Crown, World of Outlaws Sprint cars, and World of Outlaws Late Model Series tours.

==== Entry list ====
- (R) denotes rookie driver.

#	Driver	Team	Make	Sponsor
2	Andrés Pérez de Lara	Rev Racing	Chevrolet	Max Siegel Inc.
03	Alex Clubb	Clubb Racing Inc.	Ford	A. Clubb Lawn Care & Landscaping
06	Nate Moeller	Wayne Peterson Racing	Ford	Ocean Pipe Works
6	Lavar Scott (R)	Rev Racing	Chevrolet	Max Siegel Inc.
10	Matt Kemp	Fast Track Racing	Toyota	ELH Detailing / PSS&C
11	Cody Dennison (R)	Fast Track Racing	Toyota	Timcast
12	Ryan Roulette	Fast Track Racing	Ford	Bellator Recruiting Academy / VFW
15	Kris Wright	Venturini Motorsports	Toyota	FNB Corporation
18	William Sawalich	Joe Gibbs Racing	Toyota	Starkey / SoundGear
20	Sean Hingorani	Venturini Motorsports	Toyota	Mobil 1
22	Amber Balcaen	Venturini Motorsports	Toyota	ICON Direct
25	Toni Breidinger	Venturini Motorsports	Toyota	Ruedebusch Development
31	Tim Goulet	Rise Motorsports	Chevrolet	Max Buchanan Foundation
32	Christian Rose	AM Racing	Ford	West Virginia Department of Tourism
35	Greg Van Alst	Greg Van Alst Motorsports	Ford	CB Fabricating / Top Choice Fence
48	Brad Smith	Brad Smith Motorsports	Ford	Ski's Graphics
55	Gavan Boschele	Venturini Motorsports	Toyota	JBL
86	Chris Golden	Clubb Racing Inc.	Ford	CRS Suspension
98	Dale Shearer	Shearer Speed Racing	Toyota	Shearer Speed Racing
99	Michael Maples (R)	Fast Track Racing	Chevrolet	Don Ray Petroleum LLC
Official entry list

== Practice ==
The first and only practice session was held on Saturday, June 29, at 4:30 PM EST, and would last for 45 minutes. William Sawalich, driving for Joe Gibbs Racing, would set the fastest time in the session, with a lap of 16.675, and a speed of 94.453 mph (152.007 km/h).

Pos.	#	Driver	Team	Make	Time	Speed
1	18	William Sawalich	Joe Gibbs Racing	Toyota	16.675	94.453
2	55	Gavan Boschele	Venturini Motorsports	Toyota	16.908	93.151
3	15	Kris Wright	Venturini Motorsports	Toyota	16.939	92.981
Full practice results

== Qualifying ==
Qualifying was held on Saturday, June 29 and started at 6:00 PM ET. The qualifying system used is a single-car, two-lap system with only one round. Whoever sets the fastest time in that round wins the pole.

William Sawalich, driving for Joe Gibbs Racing, would score the pole for the race, with a lap of 16.762, and a speed of 93.963 mph (151.219 km/h).

No drivers would fail to qualify.

=== Qualifying results ===
Pos.	#	Driver	Team	Make	Time	Speed
1	18	William Sawalich	Joe Gibbs Racing	Toyota	16.762	93.963
2	55	Gavan Boschele	Venturini Motorsports	Toyota	16.826	93.605
3	2	Andrés Pérez de Lara	Rev Racing	Chevrolet	16.836	93.550
4	6	Lavar Scott (R)	Rev Racing	Chevrolet	16.861	93.411
5	20	Sean Hingorani	Venturini Motorsports	Toyota	16.866	93.383
6	15	Kris Wright	Venturini Motorsports	Toyota	16.873	93.344
7	25	Toni Breidinger	Venturini Motorsports	Toyota	17.057	92.337
8	32	Christian Rose	AM Racing	Ford	17.135	91.917
9	35	Greg Van Alst	Greg Van Alst Motorsports	Ford	17.156	91.805
10	22	Amber Balcaen	Venturini Motorsports	Toyota	17.208	91.527
11	10	Matt Kemp	Fast Track Racing	Toyota	17.586	89.560
12	11	Cody Dennison (R)	Fast Track Racing	Toyota	17.747	88.747
13	99	Michael Maples (R)	Fast Track Racing	Chevrolet	18.408	85.561
14	31	Tim Goulet	Rise Motorsports	Chevrolet	18.444	85.394
15	03	Alex Clubb	Clubb Racing Inc.	Ford	18.653	84.437
16	12	Ryan Roulette	Fast Track Racing	Ford	18.775	83.888
17	06	Nate Moeller	Wayne Peterson Racing	Ford	19.084	82.530
18	48	Brad Smith	Brad Smith Motorsports	Ford	19.166	82.177
19	98	Dale Shearer	Shearer Speed Racing	Toyota	21.473	73.348
20	86	Chris Golden	Clubb Racing Inc.	Ford	21.534	73.140
Official qualifying results

== Race results ==
Pos.	St.	#	Driver	Team	Make	Laps	Led	Status	Pts
1	1	18	William Sawalich	Joe Gibbs Racing	Toyota	200	195	Running	48
2	4	6	Lavar Scott	Rev Racing	Chevrolet	200	0	Running	42
3	5	20	Sean Hingorani	Venturini Motorsports	Toyota	200	0	Running	41
4	6	15	Kris Wright	Venturini Motorsports	Toyota	200	0	Running	40
5	3	2	Andrés Pérez de Lara	Rev Racing	Chevrolet	200	5	Running	40
6	7	25	Toni Breidinger	Venturini Motorsports	Toyota	200	0	Running	38
7	9	35	Greg Van Alst	Greg Van Alst Motorsports	Ford	199	0	Running	37
8	2	55	Gavan Boschele	Venturini Motorsports	Toyota	199	0	Running	36
9	8	32	Christian Rose	AM Racing	Ford	199	0	Running	35
10	10	22	Amber Balcaen	Venturini Motorsports	Toyota	198	0	Running	34
11	13	99	Michael Maples (R)	Fast Track Racing	Chevrolet	190	0	Running	33
12	15	03	Alex Clubb	Clubb Racing Inc.	Ford	184	0	Running	32
13	14	31	Tim Goulet	Rise Motorsports	Chevrolet	183	0	Running	31
14	17	06	Nate Moeller	Wayne Peterson Racing	Ford	180	0	Running	30
15	16	12	Ryan Roulette	Fast Track Racing	Ford	179	0	Running	29
16	12	11	Cody Dennison (R)	Fast Track Racing	Toyota	121	0	Mechanical	28
17	11	10	Matt Kemp	Fast Track Racing	Toyota	85	0	Mechanical	27
18	18	48	Brad Smith	Brad Smith Motorsports	Ford	13	0	Mechanical	26
19	20	86	Chris Golden	Clubb Racing Inc.	Ford	5	0	Mechanical	25
20	19	98	Dale Shearer	Shearer Speed Racing	Toyota	3	0	Mechanical	24

== Standings after the race ==
Drivers' Championship standings

	Pos	Driver	Points
	1	Andrés Pérez de Lara	389
	2	Greg Van Alst	349 (-40)
	3	Lavar Scott	343 (–46)
	4	Toni Breidinger	332 (–57)
1	5	Kris Wright	328 (–61)
1	6	Christian Rose	327 (–62)
	7	Amber Balcaen	322 (–67)
1	8	Michael Maples	280 (–109)
1	9	Alex Clubb	271 (–118)
2	10	Andy Jankowiak	262 (–127)

- Note: Only the first 10 positions are included for the driver standings.

Previous race: 2024 Zinsser SmartCoat 150	ARCA Menards Series; 2024 season	Next race: 2024 Circle City 200
