= 2025 General Tire 150 (Charlotte) =

5th race of the 2025 ARCA Menards Series

Race details
- Race 5 of 20 of the 2025 ARCA Menards Series
- Date: May 23, 2025
- Official name: 7th Annual General Tire 150
- Location: Charlotte Motor Speedway in Concord, North Carolina
- Course: Permanent racing facility
- Course length: 1.5 miles (2.4 km)
- Distance: 100 laps, 150 mi (241 km)
- Scheduled distance: 100 laps, 150 mi (241 km)
- Average speed: 108.376 mph (174.414 km/h)

Pole position
Driver	Will Kimmel	Kimmel Racing
- Time: 30.611

Most laps led
Driver	Austin Green	Pinnacle Racing Group
- Laps: 52

Winner
No. 82	Austin Green	Pinnacle Racing Group

Television in the United States
- Network: FS1
- Announcers: Brent Stover and Phil Parsons

Radio in the United States
- Radio: MRN

The 2025 General Tire 150 was the 5th stock car race of the 2025 ARCA Menards Series season, and the 7th and final running of the event. The race was held on Friday, May 23, 2025, at Charlotte Motor Speedway in Concord, North Carolina, a 1.5 mile (2.4 km) permanent asphalt tri-oval shaped intermediate speedway. The race took the scheduled 100 laps to complete. In a chaotic race, Austin Green, driving for Pinnacle Racing Group, would dominate the final stages of the event, leading a race-high 52 laps to earn his first career ARCA Menards Series win in his second start. To fill out the podium, Grant Enfinger, driving for CR7 Motorsports, and Lavar Scott, driving for Rev Racing, would finish 2nd and 3rd, respectively.

== Report ==
=== Entry list ===
- (R) denotes rookie driver.

#	Driver	Team	Make	Sponsor
2	Lanie Buice	Rev Racing	Chevrolet	Max Siegel Inc.
03	Alex Clubb	Clubb Racing Inc.	Ford	Yavapai Bottle Gas
06	Brayton Laster (R)	Wayne Peterson Racing	Toyota	Peerless Pump / GEARS Racing League
6	Lavar Scott	Rev Racing	Chevrolet	Max Siegel Inc.
07	Jeff Scofield	Scofield Motorsports	Chevrolet	Husqvarna / JXT Transportation
9	Nate Moeller	Fast Track Racing	Toyota	Fast Track Racing
10	Tony Cosentino	Fast Track Racing	Toyota	Freedom Pool Service
11	Mike Basham	Fast Track Racing	Ford	Double "H" Ranch
12	Matt Kemp	Fast Track Racing	Ford	ELHDetailing.com
18	William Sawalich	Joe Gibbs Racing	Toyota	Starkey
20	Lawless Alan	Venturini Motorsports	Toyota	AutoParkIt.com
23	Spencer Gallagher	Sigma Performance Services	Chevrolet	SPS / Allegiant Travel Company
25	Patrick Staropoli	Venturini Motorsports	Toyota	Syfovre
27	Tim Richmond	Richmond Motorsports	Toyota	Latino Immigration & Law Center
28	Brenden Queen (R)	Pinnacle Racing Group	Chevrolet	Folsom Fence Supply
30	Garrett Mitchell	Rette Jones Racing	Ford	Kenetik
31	Rick Goodale	Rise Motorsports	Toyota	risemotorsports.com
36	Ryan Huff	Ryan Huff Motorsports	Ford	Commonwealth Equipment
40	Andrew Patterson	Andrew Patterson Racing	Chevrolet	WinSupply
46	Thad Moffitt	Nitro Motorsports	Toyota	Leer
48	Brad Smith	Brad Smith Motorsports	Ford	Gary's Speed Shop
55	Isabella Robusto (R)	Venturini Motorsports	Toyota	Mobil 1
57	Bryan Dauzat	Brother-In-Law Racing	Chevrolet	O. B. Builders
67	Ryan Roulette	Maples Motorsports	Ford	VFW
69	Will Kimmel	Kimmel Racing	Ford	Weddington Custom Homes
73	Andy Jankowiak	KLAS Motorsports	Toyota	Acacia Energy / Whelen
76	Kole Raz	AM Racing	Ford	Cyclum Nextgen Travel Centers
79	Jason Kitzmiller	ACR Motorsports	Chevrolet	A.L.L. Construction / Carter Cat
82	Austin Green	Pinnacle Racing Group	Chevrolet	Overplay Games
86	Casey Carden	Clubb Racing Inc.	Ford	Clubb Racing Inc.
97	Grant Enfinger	CR7 Motorsports	Chevrolet	A.L.L. Construction / Carter Cat
99	Michael Maples	Maples Motorsports	Chevrolet	Don Ray Petroleum / Maples Motorsports
Official entry list

== Practice ==
The first and only practice session was held on Friday, May 23, at 1:30 PM EST, and would last for 45 minutes. Will Kimmel, driving for family-owned Kimmel Racing, would set the fastest time in the session, with a lap of 30.732, and a speed of 175.713 mph (282.783 km/h).

Pos.	#	Driver	Team	Make	Time	Speed
1	69	Will Kimmel	Kimmel Racing	Ford	30.732	175.713
2	28	Brenden Queen (R)	Pinnacle Racing Group	Chevrolet	30.838	175.109
3	18	William Sawalich	Joe Gibbs Racing	Toyota	31.085	173.717
Full practice results

== Qualifying ==
Qualifying was held on Friday, May 23, at 2:30 PM EST. The qualifying procedure used is a multi-car, multi-lap based system. All drivers will be on track for a 20-minute timed session, and whoever sets the fastest time in that session will win the pole.

Will Kimmel, driving for family-owned Kimmel Racing, would score the pole for the race, with a lap of 30.611, and a speed of 176.407 mph (283.900 km/h). It was Kimmel's first pole in ARCA competition since 2017.

Jason Kitzmiller withdrew from the race to attend his daughter's high school graduation in Virginia. Kitzmiller was credited with starting the race after running laps in practice.

=== Qualifying results ===
Pos.	#	Driver	Team	Make	Time	Speed
1	69	Will Kimmel	Kimmel Racing	Ford	30.611	176.407
2	18	William Sawalich	Joe Gibbs Racing	Toyota	30.647	176.200
3	28	Brenden Queen (R)	Pinnacle Racing Group	Chevrolet	30.737	175.684
4	82	Austin Green	Pinnacle Racing Group	Chevrolet	30.764	175.530
5	55	Isabella Robusto (R)	Venturini Motorsports	Toyota	31.129	173.472
6	97	Grant Enfinger	CR7 Motorsports	Chevrolet	31.281	172.629
7	25	Patrick Staropoli	Venturini Motorsports	Toyota	31.301	172.518
8	73	Andy Jankowiak	KLAS Motorsports	Toyota	31.328	172.370
9	6	Lavar Scott	Rev Racing	Chevrolet	31.356	172.216
10	20	Lawless Alan	Venturini Motorsports	Toyota	31.369	172.144
11	30	Garrett Mitchell	Rette Jones Racing	Ford	31.425	171.838
12	76	Kole Raz	AM Racing	Ford	31.472	171.581
13	2	Lanie Buice	Rev Racing	Chevrolet	31.534	171.244
14	46	Thad Moffitt	Nitro Motorsports	Toyota	31.792	169.854
15	40	Andrew Patterson	Andrew Patterson Racing	Chevrolet	31.822	169.694
16	23	Spencer Gallagher	Sigma Performance Services	Chevrolet	31.872	169.428
17	10	Tony Cosentino	Fast Track Racing	Toyota	32.198	167.712
18	27	Tim Richmond	Richmond Motorsports	Toyota	32.321	167.074
19	07	Jeff Scofield	Scofield Motorsports	Chevrolet	32.755	164.860
20	57	Bryan Dauzat	Brother-In-Law Racing	Chevrolet	33.991	158.866
21	06	Brayton Laster (R)	Wayne Peterson Racing	Toyota	34.533	156.372
22	12	Matt Kemp	Fast Track Racing	Ford	34.767	155.320
23	31	Rick Goodale	Rise Motorsports	Toyota	34.965	154.440
24	67	Ryan Roulette	Maples Motorsports	Ford	35.064	154.004
25	11	Mike Basham	Fast Track Racing	Ford	35.845	150.649
26	03	Alex Clubb	Clubb Racing Inc.	Ford	36.660	147.300
27	48	Brad Smith	Brad Smith Motorsports	Ford	37.416	144.323
28	36	Ryan Huff	Ryan Huff Motorsports	Ford	38.679	139.611
29	86	Casey Carden	Clubb Racing Inc.	Ford	39.738	135.890
30	99	Michael Maples	Maples Motorsports	Chevrolet	41.049	131.550
31	9	Nate Moeller	Fast Track Racing	Toyota	43.199	125.003
32	79	Jason Kitzmiller	ACR Motorsports	Chevrolet	–	–
Official qualifying results

== Race results ==
Fin	St	#	Driver	Team	Make	Laps	Led	Status	Pts
1	4	82	Austin Green	Pinnacle Racing Group	Chevrolet	100	52	Running	48
2	6	97	Grant Enfinger	CR7 Motorsports	Chevrolet	100	15	Running	43
3	9	6	Lavar Scott	Rev Racing	Chevrolet	100	0	Running	41
4	2	18	William Sawalich	Joe Gibbs Racing	Toyota	100	21	Running	41
5	8	73	Andy Jankowiak	KLAS Motorsports	Toyota	100	0	Running	39
6	15	40	Andrew Patterson	Andrew Patterson Racing	Chevrolet	100	0	Running	38
7	14	46	Thad Moffitt	Nitro Motorsports	Toyota	99	0	Running	37
8	7	25	Patrick Staropoli	Venturini Motorsports	Toyota	99	0	Running	36
9	11	30	Garrett Mitchell	Rette Jones Racing	Ford	99	0	Running	35
10	13	2	Lanie Buice	Rev Racing	Chevrolet	99	0	Running	34
11	17	10	Tony Cosentino	Fast Track Racing	Toyota	99	0	Running	33
12	19	07	Jeff Scofield	Scofield Motorsports	Chevrolet	99	0	Running	32
13	10	20	Lawless Alan	Venturini Motorsports	Toyota	99	0	Running	31
14	3	28	Brenden Queen (R)	Pinnacle Racing Group	Chevrolet	98	0	Running	30
15	28	36	Ryan Huff	Ryan Huff Motorsports	Ford	96	0	Running	29
16	20	57	Bryan Dauzat	Brother-In-Law Racing	Chevrolet	93	0	Running	28
17	30	99	Michael Maples	Maples Motorsports	Chevrolet	93	0	Running	27
18	23	31	Rick Goodale	Rise Motorsports	Toyota	91	0	Running	26
19	26	03	Alex Clubb	Clubb Racing Inc.	Ford	90	0	Running	25
20	21	06	Brayton Laster (R)	Wayne Peterson Racing	Toyota	85	0	Running	24
21	12	76	Kole Raz	AM Racing	Ford	71	0	Running	23
22	18	27	Tim Richmond	Richmond Motorsports	Toyota	70	0	Accident	22
23	29	86	Casey Carden	Clubb Racing Inc.	Ford	40	0	Too Slow	21
24	5	55	Isabella Robusto (R)	Venturini Motorsports	Toyota	38	0	Accident	20
25	16	23	Spencer Gallagher	Sigma Performance Services	Chevrolet	37	0	Accident	19
26	24	67	Ryan Roulette	Maples Motorsports	Ford	36	0	Accident	18
27	27	48	Brad Smith	Brad Smith Motorsports	Ford	16	0	Too Slow	17
28	1	69	Will Kimmel	Kimmel Racing	Ford	13	12	Valve Spring	16
29	22	12	Matt Kemp	Fast Track Racing	Ford	12	0	Quit	15
30	25	11	Mike Basham	Fast Track Racing	Ford	10	0	Quit	14
31	31	9	Nate Moeller	Fast Track Racing	Toyota	1	0	Handling	13
32	32	79	Jason Kitzmiller	ACR Motorsports	Chevrolet	0	0	DNS	12
Official race results

== Standings after the race ==
Drivers' Championship standings

	Pos	Driver	Points
2	1	Lavar Scott	248
1	2	Brenden Queen	238 (-10)
1	3	Lawless Alan	238 (–10)
	4	Andy Jankowiak	234 (–14)
	5	Jason Kitzmiller	197 (–51)
1	6	Thad Moffitt	189 (–59)
2	7	Alex Clubb	169 (–79)
2	8	William Sawalich	164 (–84)
2	9	Isabella Robusto	160 (–88)
2	10	Michael Maples	158 (–90)

- Note: Only the first 10 positions are included for the driver standings.

Previous race: 2025 Tide 150	ARCA Menards Series; 2025 season	Next race: 2025 Henry Ford Health 200
