= Jeff Scofield =

American racing driver (born 1978)

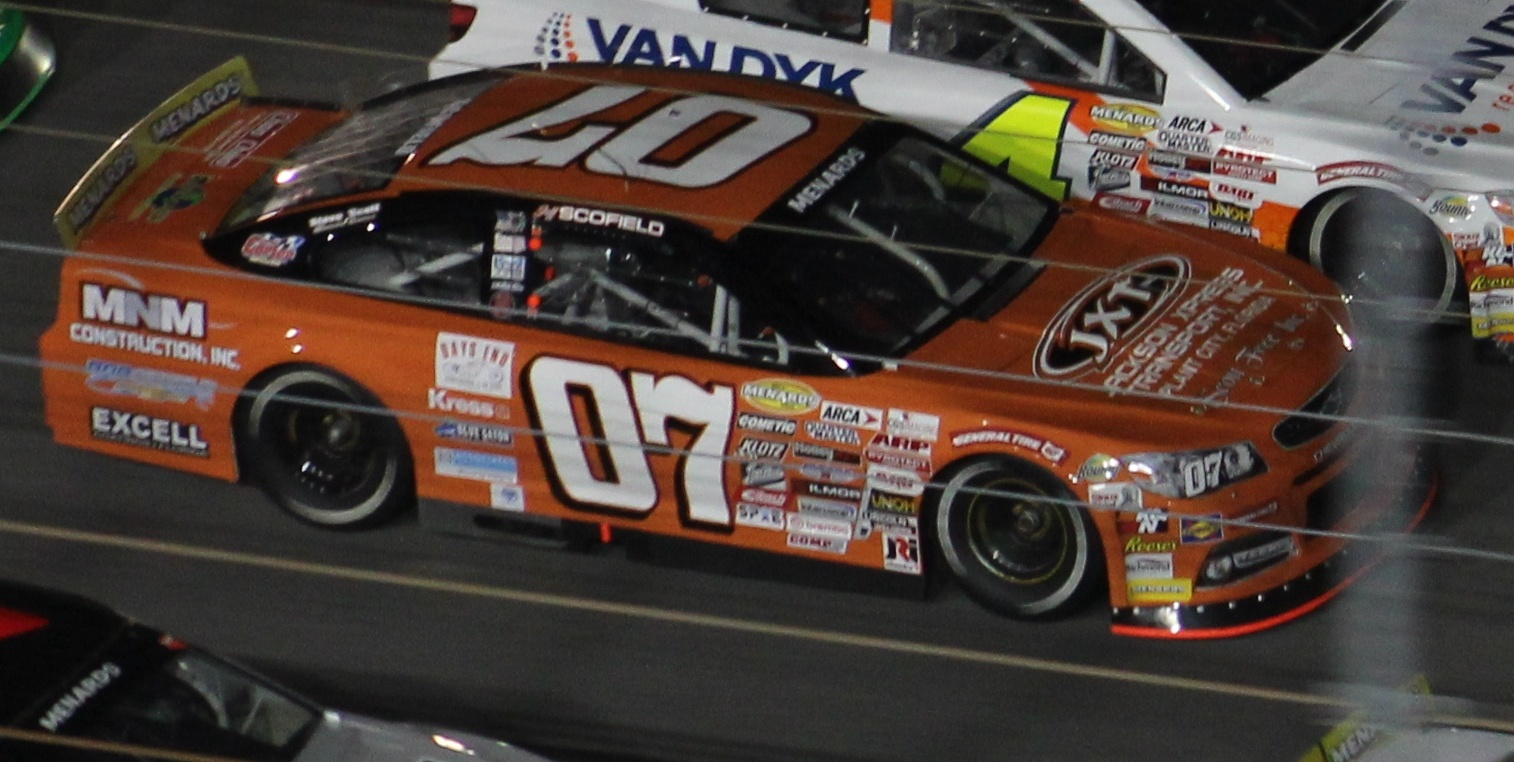
- Scofield (No. 07) racing in the 2024 ARCA Menards Series season-opener at Daytona
- Born: February 28, 1978 (age 48); Plant City, Florida, U.S.
- Achievements: 2010 FASCAR Sunbelt Super Late Model Series champion

ARCA Menards Series career
- 4 races run over 2 years
- Best finish: 72nd (2025)
- First race: 2024 Hard Rock Bet 200 (Daytona)
- Last race: 2025 General Tire 150 (Charlotte)
| Wins | Top tens | Poles |
|---|---|---|
| 0 | 0 | 0 |
- Statistics up to date as of November 17, 2025.

Jeff Scofield (born February 28, 1978) is an American professional stock car racing driver who last competed part-time in the ARCA Menards Series driving the No. 07/48 Chevrolet for Scofield Motorsports.

== Racing career ==
Scofield has previously competed in series such as the Florida Pro Series, the Bright House Challenge Series, the SARA Late Model Series, and the FASCAR Sunbelt Super Late Model Series, winning the championship in the latter series in 2010.

In 2024, it was announced that Scofield and his son Tyler had formed Scofield Motorsports, which would run in select ARCA Menards Series and ARCA Menards Series East races that year. Alongside this, Scofield participated in the pre-season test at Daytona International Speedway, and placed in the top-twenty in the overall results between the two testing days, although he was involved in a crash with Andrew Patterson during the second day of testing. A month later, Scofield made his debut in the series, driving the No. 07 Chevrolet at the season opening race at Daytona, where he qualified in fourteenth but finished in 36th after being involved in a multi-car crash three laps into the race.

In 2025, Scofield returned to ARCA at Daytona for his team. But on February 15, Brad Smith, for an unknown reason, decided to give the No. 48 Brad Smith Motorsports entry to Scofield, and so Scofield drove the No. 48 for Scofield Motorsports instead.

== Motorsports career results ==
=== Racing career summary ===
| Season | Series | Team | Races | Wins | Top 5 | Top 10 | Points | Position |
|---|---|---|---|---|---|---|---|---|
| 2024 | ARCA Menards Series | Scofield Motorsports | 1 | 0 | 0 | 0 | 20 | 105th |
| 2024 | ARCA Menards Series | Kimmel Racing | 1 | 0 | 0 | 0 | 20 | 105th |
| 2025 | ARCA Menards Series | Scofield Motorsports | 2 | 0 | 0 | 0 | 62 | 72nd |

=== ARCA Menards Series ===
(key) (Bold – Pole position awarded by qualifying time. Italics – Pole position earned by points standings or practice time. * – Most laps led. ** – All laps led.)

ARCA Menards Series results
| Year | Team | No. | Make | 1 | 2 | 3 | 4 | 5 | 6 | 7 | 8 | 9 | 10 | 11 | 12 | 13 | 14 | 15 | 16 | 17 | 18 | 19 | 20 | AMSC | Pts | Ref |
|---|---|---|---|---|---|---|---|---|---|---|---|---|---|---|---|---|---|---|---|---|---|---|---|---|---|---|
| 2024 | Scofield Motorsports | 07 | Chevy | DAY; 36 | PHO | | | | | | | | | | | | | | | | | | | 105th | 20 | |
| 2024 | Kimmel Racing | 68 | Chevy | | | TAL; 32 | DOV | KAN | CLT | IOW | MOH | BLN | IRP | SLM | ELK | MCH | ISF | MLW | DSF | GLN | BRI | KAN | TOL | 105th | 20 | |
| 2025 | Scofield Motorsports | 07 | Chevy | DAY; Wth | PHO | TAL | KAN | CLT; 12 | MCH | BLN | ELK | LRP | DOV | IRP | IOW | GLN | ISF | MAD | DSF | BRI | SLM | KAN | TOL | 72nd | 62 | |
| 2025 | Scofield Motorsports | 48 | Chevy | DAY; 14 | | | | | | | | | | | | | | | | | | | | 72nd | 62 | |
