= 2023 Dutch Boy 150 =

4th race of the 2023 ARCA Menards Series East

Race details
- Race 4 of 8 of the 2023 ARCA Menards Series East
- Date: May 20, 2023
- Official name: Inaugural Dutch Boy 150
- Location: Flat Rock Speedway in Ash Township, Michigan
- Course: Permanent racing facility
- Course length: 0.40 km (0.25 miles)
- Distance: 150 laps, 37 mi (60 km)
- Scheduled distance: 150 laps, 37 mi (60 km)
- Average speed: 57.990 mph (93.326 km/h)

Pole position
Driver	Sean Hingorani	Venturini Motorsports
- Time: 12.761

Most laps led
Driver	Sean Hingorani	Venturini Motorsports
- Laps: 102

Winner
No. 18	William Sawalich	Joe Gibbs Racing

Television in the United States
- Network: FloRacing
- Announcers: Charles Krall

Radio in the United States
- Radio: ARCA Racing Network

The 2023 Dutch Boy 150 was the 4th stock car race of the 2023 ARCA Menards Series East season, and the inaugural iteration of the event. The race was held on Saturday, May 20, 2023, at Flat Rock Speedway in Ash Township, Michigan, a 0.25 mile (0.40 km) permanent asphalt oval shaped short track. The race took the scheduled 150 laps to complete, and was also the first ARCA race to be held at Flat Rock since 2000. William Sawalich, driving for Joe Gibbs Racing, would find redemption from Nashville, taking the lead from Sean Hingorani late in the race and leading the final 48 laps to earn his second career ARCA Menards Series East win, and his second of the season. Hingorani won the pole and led a race-high 102 laps, before falling back in the final stages and finishing 3rd. To fill out the podium, Lavar Scott, driving for Rev Racing, would finish in 2nd, respectively.

== Report ==
=== Background ===
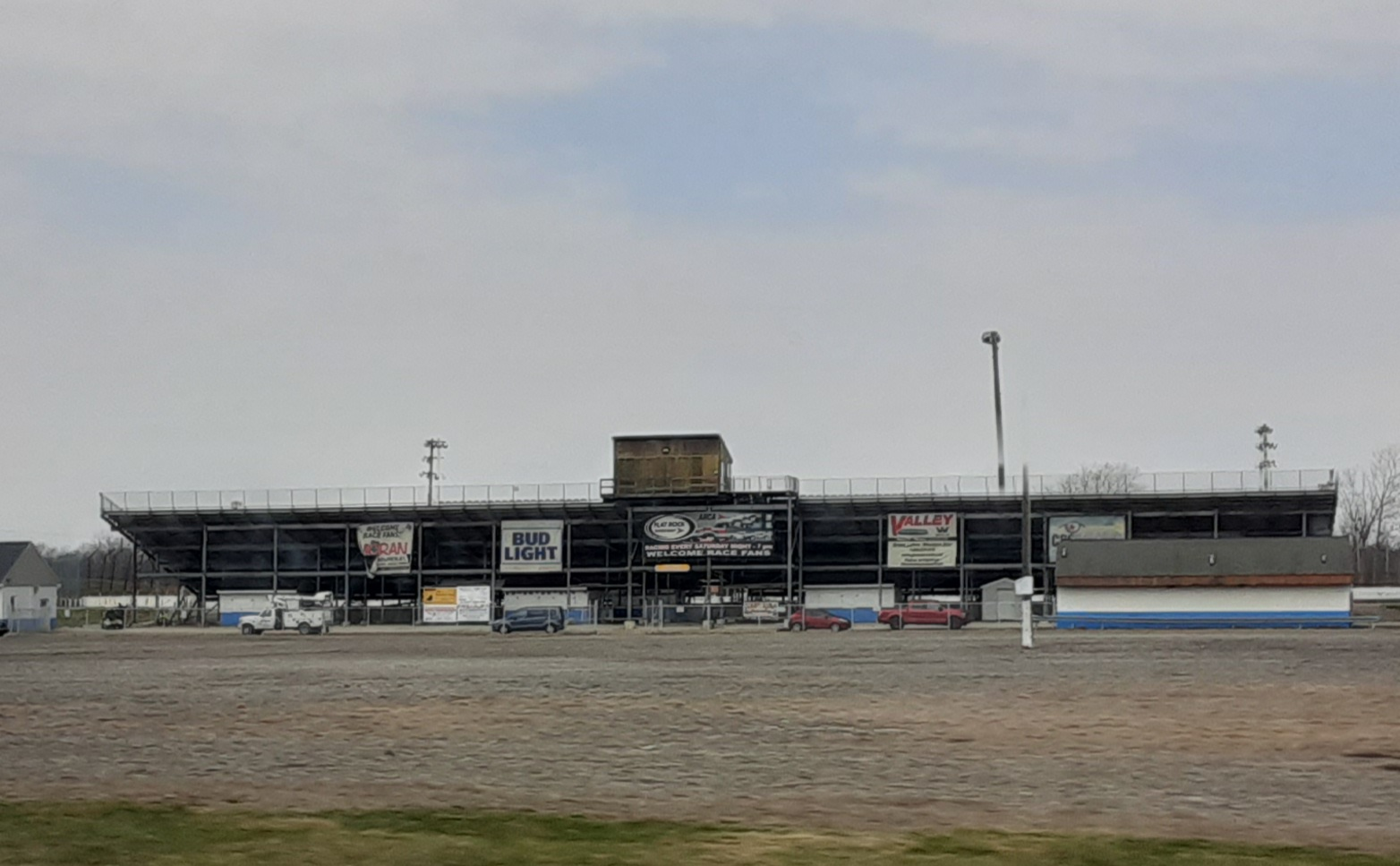
Flat Rock Speedway, the circuit where the race was held

Flat Rock Speedway is a race track in Monroe County in the U.S. state of Michigan. It is located in Ash Township just south of the city of Flat Rock along U.S. Route 24. Opened in 1953, it is owned by NASCAR and is the sister track to Toledo Speedway. It features racing on Saturday nights that include Outlaw Body Late Models, Street Stocks, and Figure 8s for its weekly divisions. It is the closest NASCAR-style oval track racing circuit to Detroit, Michigan.

==== Entry list ====
- (R) denotes rookie driver.

#	Driver	Team	Make	Sponsor
01	Dallas Frueh	Fast Track Racing	Toyota	Fast Track Racing
06	Nate Moeller	Wayne Peterson Racing	Toyota	Wayne Peterson Racing
6	Lavar Scott (R)	Rev Racing	Chevrolet	Max Siegel Inc.
10	Tim Monroe	Fast Track Racing	Ford	Universal Technical Institute
11	Zachary Tinkle	Fast Track Racing	Toyota	The NASCAR Foundation NASCAR Day Giveathon
12	Ryan Roulette	Fast Track Racing	Ford	Bellator Recruiting Academy / VFW
15	Sean Hingorani (R)	Venturini Motorsports	Toyota	GearWrench
18	William Sawalich (R)	Joe Gibbs Racing	Toyota	Starkey / SoundGear
20	Billy Venturini	Venturini Motorsports	Toyota	JBL
28	Luke Fenhaus (R)	Pinnacle Racing Group	Chevrolet	Chevrolet Performance
31	Derrick McGrew Jr.	Rise Motorsports	Chevrolet	Next Generation Roofing
48	Brad Smith	Brad Smith Motorsports	Chevrolet	Insta-Lub Fast Lube Centers
49	Jeff Smith	Brad Smith Motorsports	Ford	Ski's Graphics
65	Jeffery MacZink	MacZink Racing	Toyota	Syncon Performance Flooring
69	Will Kimmel	Kimmel Racing	Ford	T&T Construction / Valvoline
98	Dale Shearer	Shearer Speed Racing	Toyota	Shearer Speed Racing
Official entry list

== Practice ==
The first and only practice session was held on Saturday, May 20, at 3:30 PM EST, and would last for 60 minutes. William Sawalich, driving for Joe Gibbs Racing, would set the fastest time in the session, with a lap of 12.876, and a speed of 69.897 mph (112.488 km/h).

Pos.	#	Driver	Team	Make	Time	Speed
1	18	William Sawalich (R)	Joe Gibbs Racing	Toyota	12.876	69.897
2	15	Sean Hingorani (R)	Venturini Motorsports	Toyota	12.925	69.632
3	6	Lavar Scott (R)	Rev Racing	Chevrolet	13.121	69.592
Full practice results

== Qualifying ==
Qualifying was held on Saturday, May 20, at 5:10 PM EST. The qualifying system used is a single-car, two-lap based system. All drivers will be on track by themselves and will have two laps to post a qualifying time. The driver who sets the fastest time in qualifying will win the pole.

Sean Hingorani, driving for Venturini Motorsports, would score the pole for the race, with a lap of 12.761, and a speed of 70.527 mph (113.502 km/h).

=== Qualifying results ===
Pos.	#	Driver	Team	Make	Time	Speed
1	15	Sean Hingorani (R)	Venturini Motorsports	Toyota	12.761	70.527
2	6	Lavar Scott (R)	Rev Racing	Chevrolet	12.821	70.197
3	28	Luke Fenhaus (R)	Pinnacle Racing Group	Chevrolet	12.831	70.143
4	18	William Sawalich (R)	Joe Gibbs Racing	Toyota	12.838	70.104
5	20	Billy Venturini	Venturini Motorsports	Toyota	12.873	69.914
6	11	Zachary Tinkle	Fast Track Racing	Toyota	13.080	68.807
7	69	Will Kimmel	Kimmel Racing	Ford	13.264	67.853
8	65	Jeffery MacZink	MacZink Racing	Toyota	13.281	67.766
9	10	Tim Monroe	Fast Track Racing	Ford	13.315	67.593
10	31	Derrick McGrew Jr.	Rise Motorsports	Chevrolet	13.730	65.550
11	01	Dallas Frueh	Fast Track Racing	Toyota	14.073	63.952
12	12	Ryan Roulette	Fast Track Racing	Ford	14.148	63.613
13	48	Brad Smith	Brad Smith Motorsports	Chevrolet	14.553	61.843
14	98	Dale Shearer	Shearer Speed Racing	Toyota	14.682	61.300
15	06	Nate Moeller	Wayne Peterson Racing	Toyota	14.879	60.488
16	49	Jeff Smith	Brad Smith Motorsports	Ford	–	–
Official qualifying results

== Race results ==
Fin	St	#	Driver	Team	Make	Laps	Led	Status	Pts
1	4	18	William Sawalich (R)	Joe Gibbs Racing	Toyota	150	48	Running	47
2	2	6	Lavar Scott (R)	Rev Racing	Chevrolet	150	0	Running	42
3	1	15	Sean Hingorani (R)	Venturini Motorsports	Toyota	150	102	Running	44
4	5	20	Billy Venturini	Venturini Motorsports	Toyota	150	0	Running	40
5	3	28	Luke Fenhaus (R)	Pinnacle Racing Group	Chevrolet	150	0	Running	39
6	6	11	Zachary Tinkle	Fast Track Racing	Toyota	149	0	Running	38
7	9	10	Tim Monroe	Fast Track Racing	Ford	146	0	Running	37
8	7	69	Will Kimmel	Kimmel Racing	Ford	146	0	Running	36
9	8	65	Jeffery MacZink	MacZink Racing	Toyota	146	0	Running	35
10	10	31	Derrick McGrew Jr.	Rise Motorsports	Chevrolet	143	0	Running	34
11	14	98	Dale Shearer	Shearer Speed Racing	Toyota	134	0	Running	33
12	12	12	Ryan Roulette	Fast Track Racing	Ford	42	0	Engine	32
13	13	48	Brad Smith	Brad Smith Motorsports	Chevrolet	31	0	Brakes	31
14	15	06	Nate Moeller	Wayne Peterson Racing	Toyota	25	0	Brakes	30
15	11	01	Dallas Frueh	Fast Track Racing	Toyota	18	0	Overheating	29
16	16	49	Jeff Smith	Brad Smith Motorsports	Ford	1	0	Clutch	28
Official race results

== Standings after the race ==
Drivers' Championship standings

	Pos	Driver	Points
	1	William Sawalich	183
	2	Luke Fenhaus	169 (-14)
1	3	Sean Hingorani	160 (–23)
1	4	Lavar Scott	158 (–25)
1	5	Zachary Tinkle	150 (–33)
1	6	Tim Monroe	134 (–49)
4	7	Jake Finch	128 (–55)
	8	Dale Shearer	127 (–56)
3	9	Brad Smith	96 (–87)
1	10	Rita Goulet	94 (–89)

- Note: Only the first 10 positions are included for the driver standings.

Previous race: 2023 Music City 200	ARCA Menards Series East; 2023 season	Next race: 2023 Calypso Lemonade 150
