= 2023 Sprecher 150 =

15th race of the 2023 ARCA Menards Series

Race details
- Race 15 of 20 of the 2023 ARCA Menards Series; Race 7 of 8 of the 2023 ARCA Menards Series East
- Date: August 27, 2023
- Official name: 3rd Annual Sprecher 150
- Location: Milwaukee Mile, West Allis, Wisconsin
- Course: Permanent racing facility
- Course length: 1 miles (1.6 km)
- Distance: 150 laps, 150 mi (240 km)
- Scheduled distance: 150 laps, 150 mi (240 km)
- Average speed: 91.978 mph (148.024 km/h)

Pole position
| Driver | William Sawalich | Joe Gibbs Racing |
- Time: 29.069

Most laps led
| Driver | William Sawalich | Joe Gibbs Racing |
- Laps: 141

Winner
| No. 18 | William Sawalich | Joe Gibbs Racing |

Television in the United States
- Network: FS1
- Announcers: Jamie Little, Phil Parsons, and Trevor Bayne

Radio in the United States
- Radio: MRN

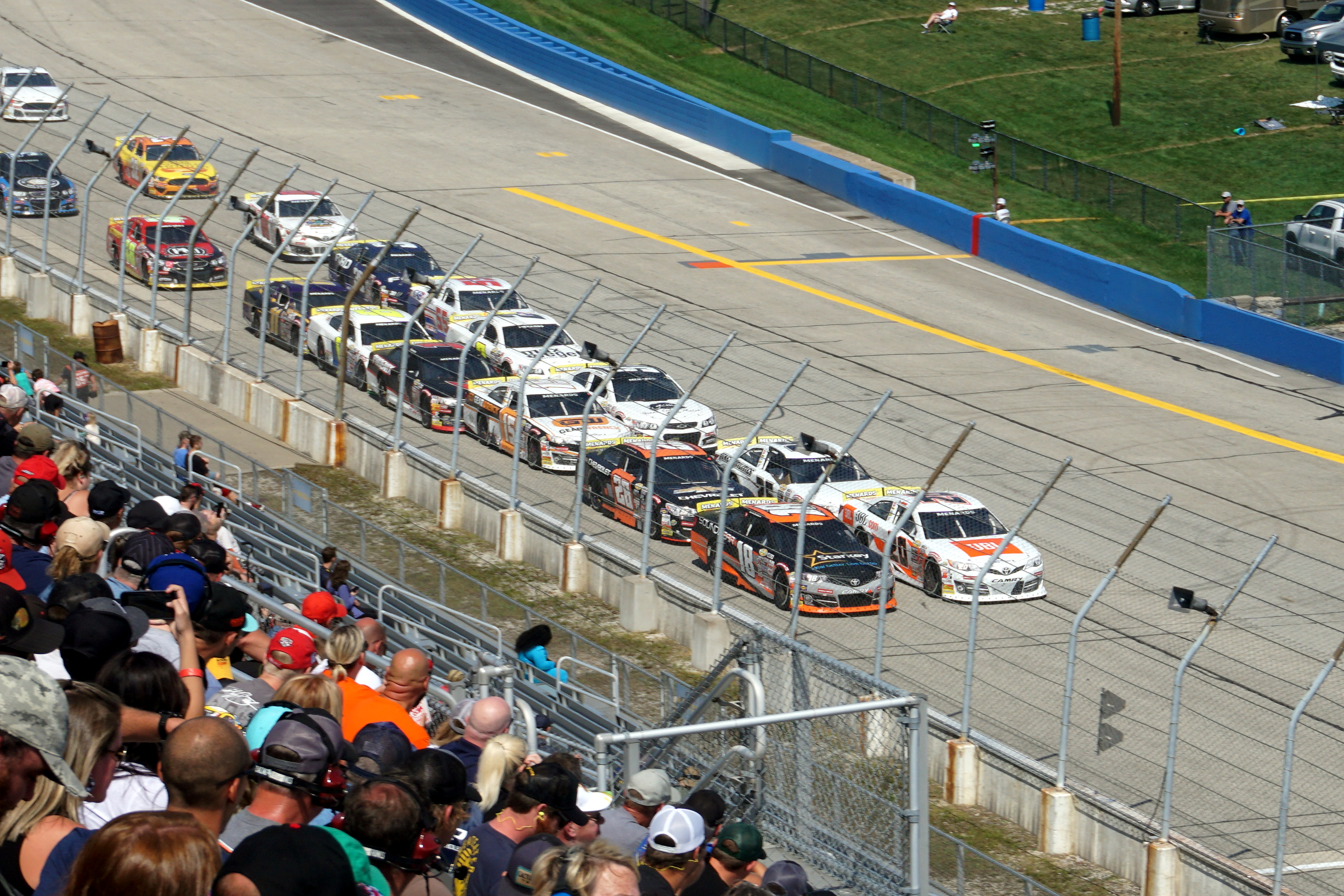
A restart during the 2023 Sprecher 150

The 2023 Sprecher 150 was the 15th stock car race of the 2023 ARCA Menards Series season, the 7th race of the 2023 ARCA Menards Series East season, and the 3rd iteration of the event. The race was held on Sunday, August 27, 2023, in West Allis, Wisconsin at the Milwaukee Mile, a 1-mile (1.6 km) permanent oval-shaped racetrack. The race took the scheduled 150 laps to complete. William Sawalich, driving for Joe Gibbs Racing, would hold off Jesse Love in a fierce battle with five laps to go, and earned his second career ARCA Menards Series win, his third career ARCA Menards Series East win, and his fourth of the season. Sawalich would also dominate the entire race, leading a race-high 141 laps. To fill out the podium, Love and Sean Hingorani, both driving for Venturini Motorsports, would finish 2nd and 3rd, respectively.

== Background ==
The Milwaukee Mile is a 1.015 mi (1.633 km) oval race track in the central United States, located on the grounds of the Wisconsin State Fair Park in West Allis, Wisconsin, a suburb west of Milwaukee. Its grandstand and bleachers seats approximately 37,000 spectators. Paved 72 years ago in 1954, it was originally a dirt track. In addition to the oval, there is a 1.800 mi (2.897 km) road circuit located on the infield.

As the oldest operating motor speedway in the world, the Milwaukee Mile has hosted at least one auto race every year from 1903 to 2015 (except during U.S. involvement in World War II). The track has held events sanctioned by major bodies, such as the AAA, USAC, NASCAR, CART/Champ Car World Series, and the IndyCar Series. There have also been many races in regional series such as ARTGO.

=== Entry list ===
- (R) denotes rookie driver.

| # | Driver | Team | Make | Sponsor |
|---|---|---|---|---|
| 01 | Dallas Frueh | Fast Track Racing | Toyota | Universal Technical Institute |
| 1 | Jake Finch | Phoenix Racing | Toyota | Phoenix Construction |
| 2 | Andrés Pérez de Lara (R) | Rev Racing | Chevrolet | Max Siegel Inc. |
| 03 | Alex Clubb | Clubb Racing Inc. | Ford | Clubb Racing Inc. |
| 06 | A. J. Moyer (R) | Wayne Peterson Racing | Toyota | Choo Choo Lawn Equipment |
| 6 | Lavar Scott (R) | Rev Racing | Chevrolet | Max Siegel Inc. |
| 10 | Ron Vandermeir Jr. | Fast Track Racing | Ford | MAK RAK Repair |
| 11 | Zachary Tinkle | Fast Track Racing | Toyota | Racing for Rescues |
| 12 | Tim Monroe | Fast Track Racing | Ford | Universal Technical Institute |
| 15 | Sean Hingorani (R) | Venturini Motorsports | Toyota | GearWrench |
| 18 | William Sawalich (R) | Joe Gibbs Racing | Toyota | Starkey, SoundGear |
| 20 | Jesse Love | Venturini Motorsports | Toyota | JBL |
| 25 | Conner Jones | Venturini Motorsports | Toyota | Jones Utilities |
| 28 | Luke Fenhaus (R) | Pinnacle Racing Group | Chevrolet | Chevrolet Performance |
| 30 | Frankie Muniz (R) | Rette Jones Racing | Ford | Ford Performance |
| 31 | Rita Goulet (R) | Rise Motorsports | Chevrolet | nationalpolice.org |
| 32 | Christian Rose (R) | AM Racing | Ford | West Virginia Tourism |
| 48 | Rick Redig-Tackman | Brad Smith Motorsports | Chevrolet | Oktoberfest Race Weekend |
| 55 | Gus Dean | Venturini Motorsports | Toyota | CAB Installers |
| 66 | Jon Garrett (R) | Veer Motorsports | Chevrolet | MonsterTrucks.fun |
| 69 | Brad Smith | Brad Smith Motorsports | Ford | Copraya.com |
| 97 | Grant Enfinger | CR7 Motorsports | Chevrolet | Grant County Mulch |
| 98 | Dale Shearer | Shearer Speed Racing | Toyota | Shearer Speed Racing |
Official entry list

== Practice ==
The first and only practice session was held on Saturday, August 26, at 2:00 PM CST, and would last for 45 minutes. William Sawalich, driving for Joe Gibbs Racing, would set the fastest time in the session, with a lap of 29.332, and an average speed of 124.574 mph (200.482 km/h).

| Pos. | # | Driver | Team | Make | Time | Speed |
|---|---|---|---|---|---|---|
| 1 | 18 | William Sawalich (R) | Joe Gibbs Racing | Toyota | 29.332 | 124.574 |
| 2 | 20 | Jesse Love | Venturini Motorsports | Toyota | 29.482 | 123.940 |
| 3 | 25 | Conner Jones | Venturini Motorsports | Toyota | 29.555 | 123.634 |
Full practice results

== Qualifying ==
Qualifying was held on Saturday, August 26, at 3:00 PM CST. The qualifying system used is a single-car, two-lap system with only one round. Whoever sets the fastest time in that round wins the pole. William Sawalich, driving for Joe Gibbs Racing, would score the pole for the race, with a lap of 29.069, and an average speed of 125.701 mph (202.296 km/h).

| Pos. | # | Driver | Team | Make | Time | Speed |
|---|---|---|---|---|---|---|
| 1 | 18 | William Sawalich (R) | Joe Gibbs Racing | Toyota | 29.069 | 125.701 |
| 2 | 20 | Jesse Love | Venturini Motorsports | Toyota | 29.316 | 124.642 |
| 3 | 97 | Grant Enfinger | CR7 Motorsports | Chevrolet | 29.424 | 124.184 |
| 4 | 25 | Conner Jones | Venturini Motorsports | Toyota | 29.547 | 123.667 |
| 5 | 15 | Sean Hingorani (R) | Venturini Motorsports | Toyota | 29.636 | 123.296 |
| 6 | 2 | Andrés Pérez de Lara (R) | Rev Racing | Chevrolet | 29.694 | 123.055 |
| 7 | 28 | Luke Fenhaus (R) | Pinnacle Racing Group | Chevrolet | 29.715 | 122.968 |
| 8 | 6 | Lavar Scott (R) | Rev Racing | Chevrolet | 29.791 | 122.654 |
| 9 | 55 | Gus Dean | Venturini Motorsports | Toyota | 29.849 | 122.416 |
| 10 | 30 | Frankie Muniz (R) | Rette Jones Racing | Ford | 29.886 | 122.265 |
| 11 | 32 | Christian Rose (R) | AM Racing | Ford | 29.955 | 121.983 |
| 12 | 1 | Jake Finch | Phoenix Racing | Toyota | 30.193 | 121.021 |
| 13 | 10 | Ron Vandermeir Jr. | Fast Track Racing | Ford | 30.261 | 120.749 |
| 14 | 11 | Zachary Tinkle | Fast Track Racing | Toyota | 30.637 | 119.268 |
| 15 | 66 | Jon Garrett (R) | Veer Motorsports | Chevrolet | 32.263 | 113.257 |
| 16 | 48 | Rick Redig-Tackman | Brad Smith Motorsports | Chevrolet | 32.507 | 112.407 |
| 17 | 12 | Tim Monroe | Fast Track Racing | Ford | 32.577 | 112.165 |
| 18 | 01 | Dallas Frueh | Fast Track Racing | Toyota | 33.083 | 110.449 |
| 19 | 31 | Rita Goulet (R) | Rise Motorsports | Chevrolet | 33.870 | 107.883 |
| 20 | 06 | A. J. Moyer (R) | Wayne Peterson Racing | Toyota | 34.282 | 106.587 |
| 21 | 03 | Alex Clubb | Clubb Racing Inc. | Ford | 35.385 | 103.264 |
| 22 | 98 | Dale Shearer | Shearer Speed Racing | Toyota | 35.746 | 102.221 |
| 23 | 69 | Brad Smith | Brad Smith Motorsports | Ford | – | – |
Official qualifying results

== Race results ==
| Fin | St | # | Driver | Team | Make | Laps | Led | Status | Pts |
|---|---|---|---|---|---|---|---|---|---|
| 1 | 1 | 18 | William Sawalich (R) | Joe Gibbs Racing | Toyota | 150 | 141 | Running | 49 |
| 2 | 2 | 20 | Jesse Love | Venturini Motorsports | Toyota | 150 | 9 | Running | 43 |
| 3 | 5 | 15 | Sean Hingorani (R) | Venturini Motorsports | Toyota | 150 | 0 | Running | 41 |
| 4 | 4 | 25 | Conner Jones | Venturini Motorsports | Toyota | 150 | 0 | Running | 40 |
| 5 | 3 | 97 | Grant Enfinger | CR7 Motorsports | Chevrolet | 150 | 0 | Running | 39 |
| 6 | 7 | 28 | Luke Fenhaus (R) | Pinnacle Racing Group | Chevrolet | 150 | 0 | Running | 38 |
| 7 | 6 | 2 | Andrés Pérez de Lara (R) | Rev Racing | Chevrolet | 150 | 0 | Running | 37 |
| 8 | 8 | 6 | Lavar Scott (R) | Rev Racing | Chevrolet | 150 | 0 | Running | 36 |
| 9 | 12 | 1 | Jake Finch | Phoenix Racing | Toyota | 150 | 0 | Running | 35 |
| 10 | 9 | 55 | Gus Dean | Venturini Motorsports | Toyota | 150 | 0 | Running | 34 |
| 11 | 11 | 32 | Christian Rose (R) | AM Racing | Ford | 149 | 0 | Running | 33 |
| 12 | 10 | 30 | Frankie Muniz (R) | Rette Jones Racing | Ford | 147 | 0 | Running | 32 |
| 13 | 14 | 11 | Zachary Tinkle | Fast Track Racing | Toyota | 147 | 0 | Running | 31 |
| 14 | 16 | 48 | Rick Redig-Tackman | Brad Smith Motorsports | Chevrolet | 146 | 0 | Running | 30 |
| 15 | 17 | 12 | Tim Monroe | Fast Track Racing | Ford | 144 | 0 | Running | 29 |
| 16 | 20 | 06 | A. J. Moyer (R) | Wayne Peterson Racing | Toyota | 141 | 0 | Running | 28 |
| 17 | 19 | 31 | Rita Goulet (R) | Rise Motorsports | Chevrolet | 137 | 0 | Running | 27 |
| 18 | 13 | 10 | Ron Vandermeir Jr. | Fast Track Racing | Ford | 133 | 0 | Accident | 26 |
| 19 | 22 | 98 | Dale Shearer | Shearer Speed Racing | Toyota | 104 | 0 | Mechanical | 25 |
| 20 | 23 | 69 | Brad Smith | Brad Smith Motorsports | Ford | 24 | 0 | Mechanical | 24 |
| 21 | 15 | 66 | Jon Garrett (R) | Veer Motorsports | Chevrolet | 12 | 0 | Mechanical | 23 |
| 22 | 18 | 01 | Dallas Frueh | Fast Track Racing | Toyota | 12 | 0 | Mechanical | 22 |
| 23 | 21 | 03 | Alex Clubb | Clubb Racing Inc. | Ford | 2 | 0 | Mechanical | 21 |
Official race results

== Standings after the race ==
Drivers' Championship standings (ARCA Main)

| | Pos | Driver | Points |
|---|---|---|---|
| | 1 | Jesse Love | 794 |
| | 2 | Andrés Pérez de Lara | 672 (-122) |
| | 3 | Frankie Muniz | 661 (-133) |
| | 4 | Christian Rose | 647 (-147) |
| | 5 | Jon Garrett | 583 (-211) |
| | 6 | A. J. Moyer | 527 (-267) |
| | 7 | Brad Smith | 503 (-291) |
| 1 | 8 | William Sawalich | 384 (-410) |
| 1 | 9 | Toni Breidinger | 376 (-418) |
| | 10 | Jack Wood | 285 (-509) |

Drivers' Championship standings (ARCA East)

| Pos | Driver | Points |
|---|---|---|
| 1 | William Sawalich | 372 |
| 2 | Luke Fenhaus | 347 (-25) |
| 3 | Lavar Scott | 324 (-48) |
| 4 | Zachary Tinkle | 305 (-67) |
| 5 | Tim Monroe | 262 (-110) |
| 6 | Dale Shearer | 253 (-119) |
| 7 | Sean Hingorani | 243 (-129) |
| 8 | Rita Goulet | 177 (-195) |
| 9 | Brad Smith | 172 (-200) |
| 10 | Jake Finch | 163 (-209) |

- Note: Only the first 10 positions are included for the driver standings.

| Previous race: 2023 Dutch Boy 100 | ARCA Menards Series; 2023 season | Next race: 2023 Southern Illinois 100 |

| Previous race: 2023 Reese's 200 | ARCA Menards Series East; 2023 season | Next race: 2023 Bush's Beans 200 |
