= 2023 Calypso Lemonade 150 =

9th race of the 2023 ARCA Menards Series

2023 Calypso 150
Race details
- Race 9 of 20 of the 2023 ARCA Menards Series; Race 5 of 8 of the 2023 ARCA Menards Series East
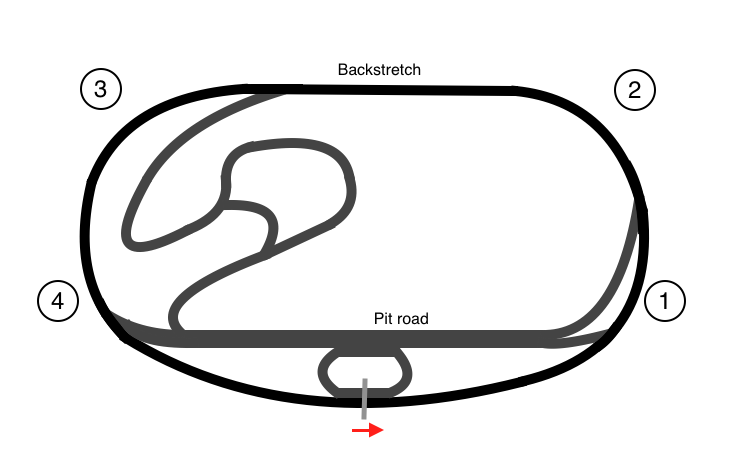
- Date: July 15, 2023
- Official name: 17th Annual Calypso 150
- Location: Iowa Speedway, Newton, Iowa
- Course: Permanent racing facility
- Course length: 0.875 miles (1.408 km)
- Distance: 156 laps, 136 mi (219 km)
- Scheduled distance: 150 laps, 131 mi (211 km)
- Average speed: 84.651 mph (136.233 km/h)

Pole position
Driver	William Sawalich	Joe Gibbs Racing
- Time: 24.143

Most laps led
Driver	William Sawalich	Joe Gibbs Racing
- Laps: 154

Winner
No. 28	Luke Fenhaus	Pinnacle Racing Group

Television in the United States
- Network: FS2
- Announcers: Eric Brennan and Phil Parsons

Radio in the United States
- Radio: ARCA Racing Network

The 2023 Calypso 150 was the 9th stock car race of the 2023 ARCA Menards Series season, the 5th race of the 2023 ARCA Menards Series East season, and the 17th iteration of the event. The race was held on Saturday, July 15, 2023, in Newton, Iowa at Iowa Speedway, a 0.875 mile (1.408 km) permanent quad-oval shaped racetrack. The race was originally scheduled to be contested over 150 laps, but was extended to 156 laps due to a NASCAR overtime finish. Luke Fenhaus, driving for Pinnacle Racing Group, would steal the win after taking advantage of the lead on the final restart, and held off William Sawalich to earn his first career ARCA Menards Series win, his second career ARCA Menards Series East win, and his third win of the season. Sawalich had dominated the entire race, leading 154 of the 156 laps until the caution came out with two laps to go. To fill out the podium, Sawalich, driving for Joe Gibbs Racing, and Jesse Love, driving for Venturini Motorsports, would finish 2nd and 3rd, respectively.

== Background ==
Iowa Speedway is a 7/8-mile (1.4 km) paved oval motor racing track in Newton, Iowa, approximately 30 mi (48 km) east of Des Moines. It has over 25,000 permanent seats as well as a unique multi-tiered RV viewing area along the backstretch. The premiere event of the track is the Hy-Vee IndyCar Race Weekend held yearly in July since its inaugural running in 2007.

=== Entry list ===
- (R) denotes rookie driver.

#	Driver	Team	Make	Sponsor
01	Brayton Laster	Fast Track Racing	Chevrolet	JunkCarBlaster.com
2	Andrés Pérez de Lara (R)	Rev Racing	Chevrolet	Max Siegel Inc.
03	Alex Clubb	Clubb Racing Inc.	Ford	Racin' With Mason
06	A. J. Moyer	Wayne Peterson Racing	Toyota	River's Edge Cottages & RV Park
6	Lavar Scott (R)	Rev Racing	Chevrolet	Max Siegel Inc.
10	Tim Monroe	Fast Track Racing	Toyota	Universal Technical Institute
11	Zachary Tinkle	Fast Track Racing	Toyota	Racing for Rescues
12	Matt Kemp	Fast Track Racing	Ford	RE/MAX Harbor Country
15	Conner Jones	Venturini Motorsports	Toyota	Jones Utilities
18	William Sawalich (R)	Joe Gibbs Racing	Toyota	Starkey, SoundGear
20	Jesse Love	Venturini Motorsports	Toyota	Yahoo!
25	Toni Breidinger	Venturini Motorsports	Toyota	FP Movement
28	Luke Fenhaus (R)	Pinnacle Racing Group	Chevrolet	Chevrolet Performance
30	Frankie Muniz (R)	Rette Jones Racing	Ford	Rette Jones Racing
31	Rita Goulet (R)	Rise Motorsports	Chevrolet	Auto DNA Collision & Detail
32	Christian Rose (R)	AM Racing	Ford	West Virginia Tourism
48	Brad Smith	Brad Smith Motorsports	Ford	Copraya.com
66	Jon Garrett (R)	Veer Motorsports	Chevrolet	Venture Foods
69	Scott Melton	Kimmel Racing	Toyota	Melton-McFadden Insurance Agency
98	Dale Shearer	Shearer Speed Racing	Toyota	Shearer Speed Racing
Official entry list

== Practice ==
The first and only practice session was held on Saturday, July 15, at 4:00 PM CST, and would last for 45 minutes. William Sawalich, driving for Joe Gibbs Racing, would set the fastest time in the session, with a lap of 24.235, and an average speed of 129.977 mph (209.178 km/h).

Pos.	#	Driver	Team	Make	Time	Speed
1	18	William Sawalich (R)	Joe Gibbs Racing	Toyota	24.235	129.977
2	28	Luke Fenhaus (R)	Pinnacle Racing Group	Chevrolet	24.474	128.708
3	15	Conner Jones	Venturini Motorsports	Toyota	24.602	128.038
Full practice results

== Qualifying ==
Qualifying was held on Saturday, July 15, at 5:00 PM CST. The qualifying system used is a single-car, two-lap system with only one round. Whoever sets the fastest time in that round wins the pole. William Sawalich, driving for Joe Gibbs Racing, would score the pole for the race, with a lap of 24.143, and an average speed of 130.473 mph (209.976 km/h).

Pos.	#	Driver	Team	Make	Time	Speed
1	18	William Sawalich (R)	Joe Gibbs Racing	Toyota	24.143	130.473
2	28	Luke Fenhaus (R)	Pinnacle Racing Group	Chevrolet	24.557	128.273
3	6	Lavar Scott (R)	Rev Racing	Chevrolet	24.781	127.114
4	25	Toni Breidinger	Venturini Motorsports	Toyota	24.834	126.842
5	20	Jesse Love	Venturini Motorsports	Toyota	24.840	126.812
6	2	Andrés Pérez de Lara (R)	Rev Racing	Chevrolet	24.843	126.796
7	15	Conner Jones	Venturini Motorsports	Toyota	24.966	126.172
8	30	Frankie Muniz (R)	Rette Jones Racing	Ford	25.122	125.388
9	32	Christian Rose (R)	AM Racing	Ford	25.364	124.192
10	66	Jon Garrett (R)	Veer Motorsports	Chevrolet	25.685	122.640
11	11	Zachary Tinkle	Fast Track Racing	Toyota	25.758	122.292
12	69	Scott Melton	Kimmel Racing	Toyota	25.819	122.003
13	01	Brayton Laster	Fast Track Racing	Chevrolet	27.045	116.473
14	10	Tim Monroe	Fast Track Racing	Toyota	27.282	115.461
15	12	Matt Kemp	Fast Track Racing	Ford	27.535	114.400
16	98	Dale Shearer	Shearer Speed Racing	Toyota	28.472	110.635
17	06	A. J. Moyer	Wayne Peterson Racing	Toyota	28.988	108.666
18	31	Rita Goulet (R)	Rise Motorsports	Chevrolet	34.525	91.238
19	48	Brad Smith	Brad Smith Motorsports	Ford	36.837	85.512
20	03	Alex Clubb	Clubb Racing Inc.	Ford	–	–
Withdrew
21	43	Jalen Mack	Tamayo Cosentino Racing	Chevrolet	–	–
22	45	Tony Cosentino	Tamayo Cosentino Racing	Ford	–	–
Official qualifying results

== Race results ==
Fin	St	#	Driver	Team	Make	Laps	Led	Status	Pts
1	2	28	Luke Fenhaus (R)	Pinnacle Racing Group	Chevrolet	156	2	Running	47
2	1	18	William Sawalich (R)	Joe Gibbs Racing	Toyota	156	154	Running	45
3	5	20	Jesse Love	Venturini Motorsports	Toyota	156	0	Running	41
4	3	6	Lavar Scott (R)	Rev Racing	Chevrolet	156	0	Running	40
5	4	25	Toni Breidinger	Venturini Motorsports	Toyota	156	0	Running	39
6	6	2	Andrés Pérez de Lara (R)	Rev Racing	Chevrolet	156	0	Running	38
7	9	32	Christian Rose (R)	AM Racing	Ford	156	0	Running	37
8	7	15	Conner Jones	Venturini Motorsports	Toyota	155	0	Running	36
9	8	30	Frankie Muniz (R)	Rette Jones Racing	Ford	155	0	Running	35
10	10	66	Jon Garrett (R)	Veer Motorsports	Chevrolet	155	0	Running	34
11	11	11	Zachary Tinkle	Fast Track Racing	Toyota	154	0	Running	33
12	12	69	Scott Melton	Kimmel Racing	Toyota	153	0	Running	32
13	20	03	Alex Clubb	Clubb Racing Inc.	Ford	149	0	Running	31
14	17	06	A. J. Moyer	Wayne Peterson Racing	Toyota	141	0	Running	30
15	19	48	Brad Smith	Brad Smith Motorsports	Ford	136	0	Electrical	29
16	18	31	Rita Goulet (R)	Rise Motorsports	Chevrolet	114	0	Running	28
17	14	10	Tim Monroe	Fast Track Racing	Toyota	57	0	Clutch	27
18	16	98	Dale Shearer	Shearer Speed Racing	Toyota	30	0	Accident	26
19	15	12	Matt Kemp	Fast Track Racing	Ford	29	0	Mechanical	25
20	13	01	Brayton Laster	Fast Track Racing	Chevrolet	19	0	Driveline	24
Official race results

== Standings after the race ==
Drivers' Championship standings (ARCA Main)

	Pos	Driver	Points
	1	Jesse Love	418
	2	Frankie Muniz	369 (-49)
	3	Andrés Pérez de Lara	355 (-63)
	4	Christian Rose	343 (-75)
1	5	Jon Garrett	304 (-114)
1	6	Toni Breidinger	303 (-115)
2	7	Tony Cosentino	276 (-142)
1	8	A. J. Moyer	269 (-149)
1	9	Jack Wood	255 (-163)
	10	Brad Smith	254 (-164)

Drivers' Championship standings (ARCA East)

	Pos	Driver	Points
	1	William Sawalich	280
	2	Luke Fenhaus	266 (-14)
1	3	Lavar Scott	249 (-31)
1	4	Zachary Tinkle	243 (-37)
1	5	Tim Monroe	211 (-69)
2	6	Dale Shearer	203 (-77)
4	7	Sean Hingorani	160 (-120)
1	8	Jake Finch	128 (-152)
	9	Brad Smith	125 (-155)
	10	Rita Goulet	122 (-158)

- Note: Only the first 10 positions are included for the driver standings.

Previous race: 2023 Zinsser SmartCoat 150	ARCA Menards Series; 2023 season	Next race: 2023 Sunset Hill Shooting Range 150

Previous race: 2023 Dutch Boy 150	ARCA Menards Series East; 2023 season	Next race: 2023 Reese's 200
