= 2023 ARCA Menards Series East =

37th season of the ARCA Menards Series East

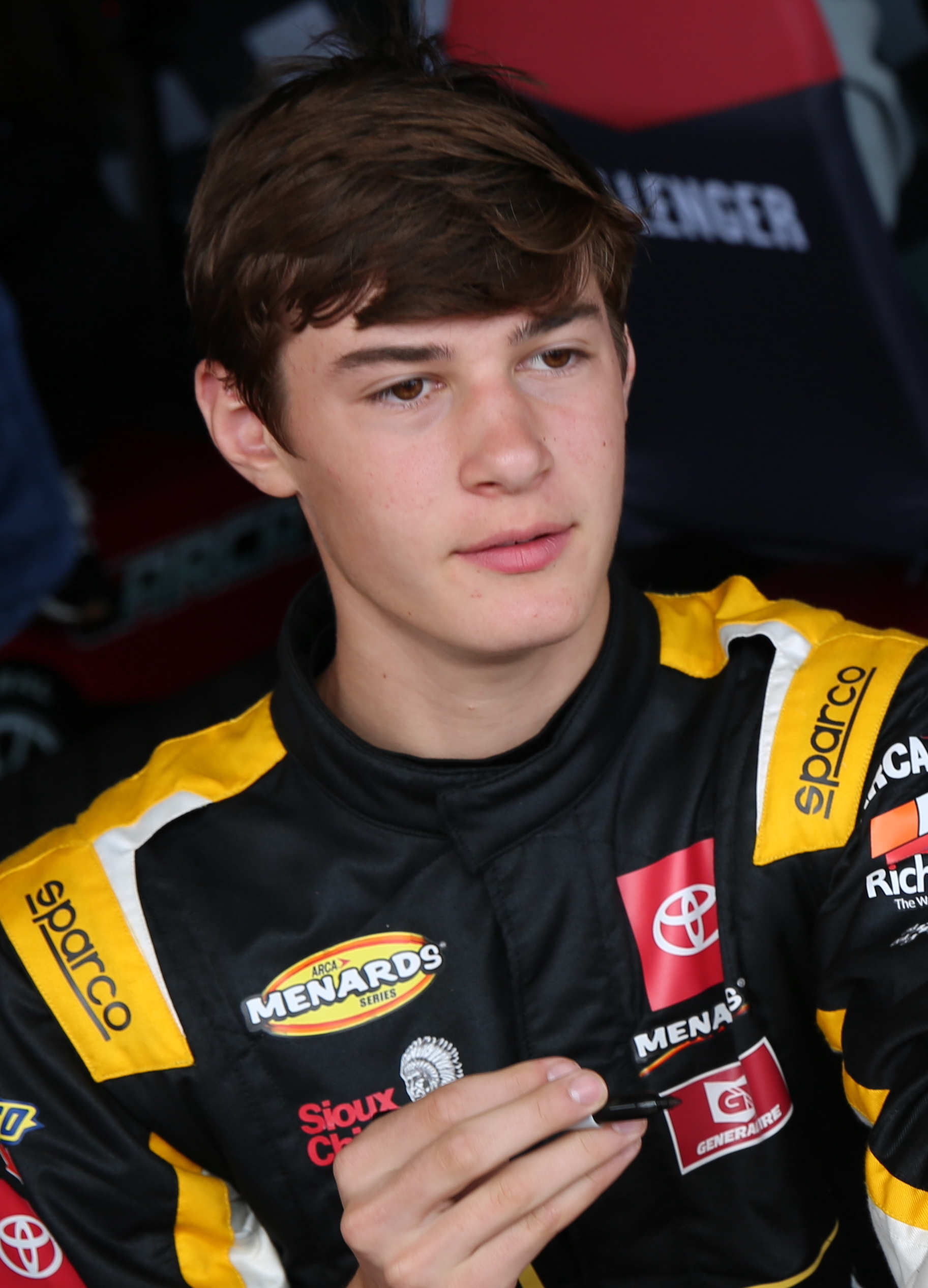
William Sawalich, the 2023 ARCA Menards Series East champion.

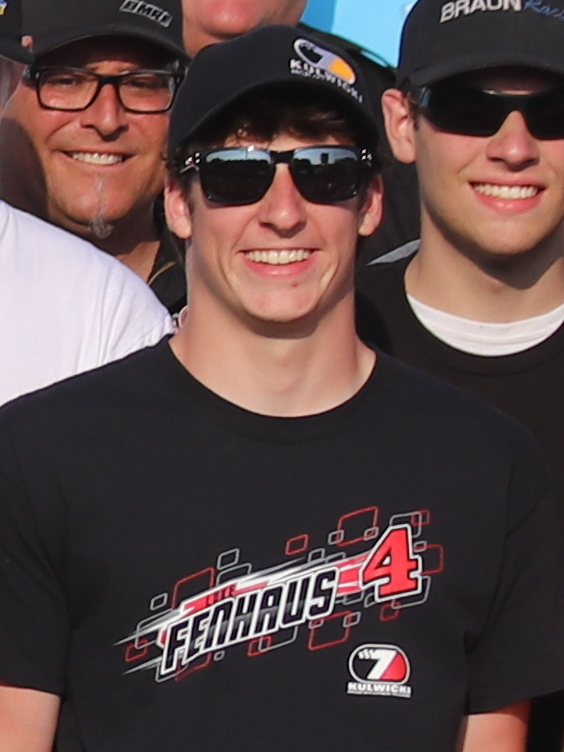
Luke Fenhaus finished second in the championship by 58 points.

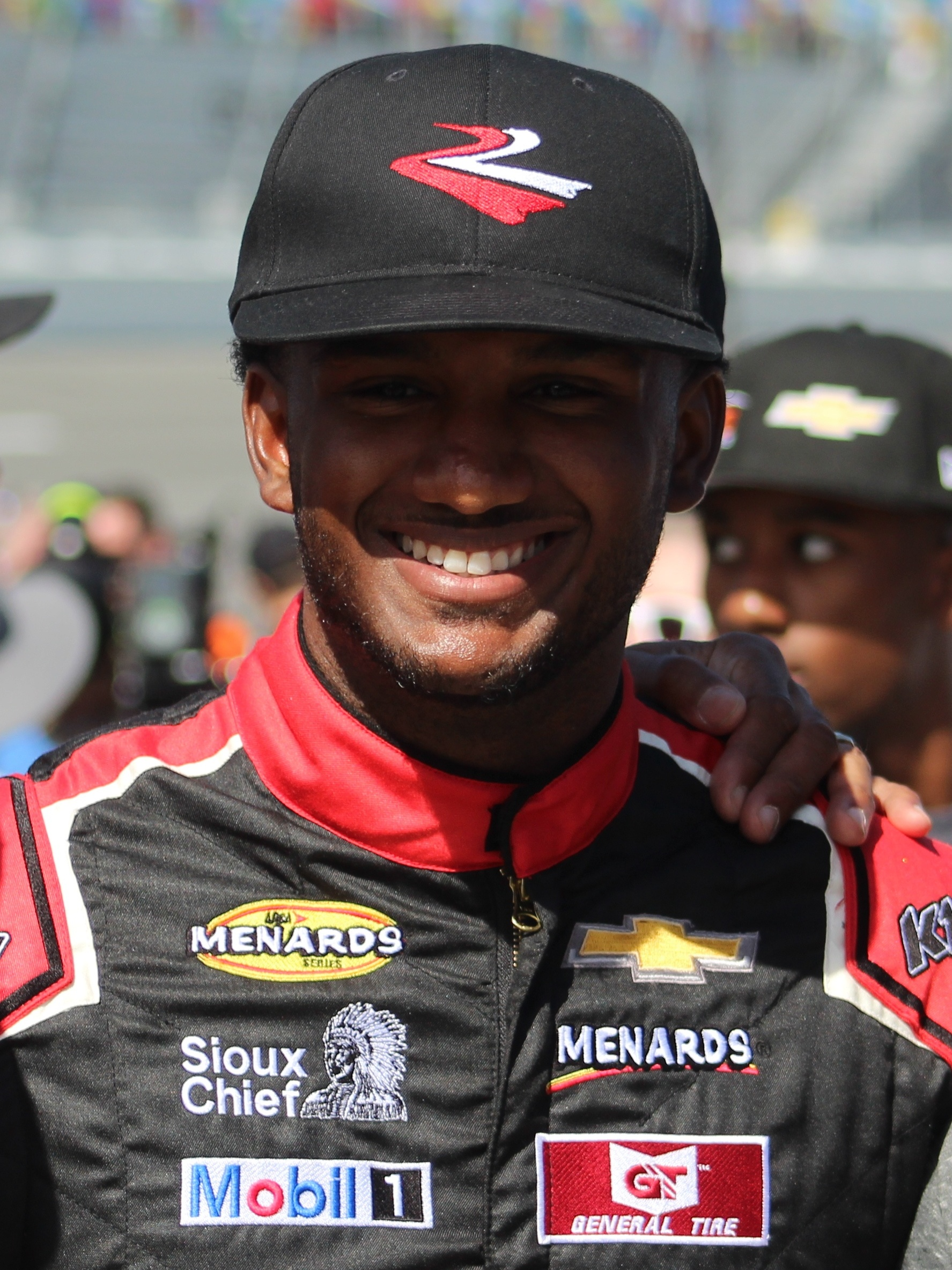
Lavar Scott finished third in the championship by 69 points.

The 2023 ARCA Menards Series East was the 37th season of the ARCA Menards Series East, a regional stock car racing series sanctioned by NASCAR in the United States. The season began on March 25 with the Pensacola 200 at Five Flags Speedway and ended on September 14 with the Bush's Beans 200 at Bristol Motor Speedway.

Sammy Smith, the defending series champion in 2021 and 2022, moved up to the NASCAR Xfinity Series to run full-time for Joe Gibbs Racing in 2023 and therefore did not return to run full-time in the ARCA Menards Series East and defend his title. William Sawalich replaced him in the No. 18 car in 2023, which went back to being owned by JGR after being owned by Kyle Busch Motorsports in 2022. At the conclusion of the season, Sawalich clinched the ARCA Menards Series East championship.

== Teams and drivers ==
Note: If a driver is listed as their own crew chief for a particular race, that means that their entry in that race was a start and park.

=== Complete schedule ===
Manufacturer	Team	No.	Driver	Crew chief
Chevrolet	Pinnacle Racing Group	28	Luke Fenhaus (R)	Shane Huffman
Chevrolet	Rev Racing	6	Lavar Scott (R)	Jay Lupo
Chevrolet	Rise Motorsports	31	Rita Goulet (R) 6	Sebastian LaForge 1 Tim Goulet 6 Rita Goulet 1
Chevrolet	Rise Motorsports	31	Derrick McGrew Jr. 1	Sebastian LaForge 1 Tim Goulet 6 Rita Goulet 1
Chevrolet	Rise Motorsports	31	Tim Goulet 1	Sebastian LaForge 1 Tim Goulet 6 Rita Goulet 1
Toyota	Fast Track Racing	11	Zachary Tinkle	Todd Parrott
Toyota	Joe Gibbs Racing	18	William Sawalich (R)	Matt Ross
Toyota	Shearer Speed Racing	98	Dale Shearer	Jimmy Edlin 2 Alex Malycke 5 Neal Shearer 1
Toyota	Venturini Motorsports	15	Sean Hingorani (R) 7	Kevin Reed Jr. 6 Monon Rahman 1 Cayden Lapcevich 1
Toyota	Venturini Motorsports	15	Conner Jones 1	Kevin Reed Jr. 6 Monon Rahman 1 Cayden Lapcevich 1
Toyota	Venturini Motorsports	20	Jake Finch 2	Johnny Allen 1 Shannon Rursch 7
Toyota	Venturini Motorsports	20	Gio Ruggiero 1	Johnny Allen 1 Shannon Rursch 7
Toyota	Venturini Motorsports	20	Billy Venturini 1	Johnny Allen 1 Shannon Rursch 7
Toyota	Venturini Motorsports	20	Jesse Love 4	Johnny Allen 1 Shannon Rursch 7
Ford 3 Chevrolet 5	Brad Smith Motorsports	48	Brad Smith 7 (Note: Brad Smith ran the full season split between the No. 48 car for his own team and the No. 69 Kimmel Racing car which he used the owner points of at Milwaukee.)	Carlos Leon 1 Terry Strange 1 Jeff Smith 3 Steve Garrow 1 Leo Kryger 1
Ford 3 Chevrolet 5	Brad Smith Motorsports	48	Rick Redig-Tackman 1	Rick Tackman Jr.
Ford 2 Toyota 4 Chevrolet 2	Fast Track Racing	01	Dallas Frueh 3	Dallas Frueh 2 Tim Monroe 2 Josh Duke 1 Nathan Davis 3
Ford 2 Toyota 4 Chevrolet 2	Fast Track Racing	01	Tim Monroe 2 (Note: Monroe ran the full season split between the Nos. 12, 01 and 10 cars for Fast Track Racing.)	Dallas Frueh 2 Tim Monroe 2 Josh Duke 1 Nathan Davis 3
Ford 2 Toyota 4 Chevrolet 2	Fast Track Racing	01	Brayton Laster 3	Dallas Frueh 2 Tim Monroe 2 Josh Duke 1 Nathan Davis 3
Ford 5 Toyota 3	Fast Track Racing	10	Ed Pompa 2	Dick Doheny 3 Tim Monroe 3 Mike Sroufe 1 Ron Vandermeir Sr. 1
Ford 5 Toyota 3	Fast Track Racing	10	Tim Monroe 4	Dick Doheny 3 Tim Monroe 3 Mike Sroufe 1 Ron Vandermeir Sr. 1
Ford 5 Toyota 3	Fast Track Racing	10	Ron Vandermeir Jr. 1 (Note: Entry was fielded in a collaboration with Vanco Racing.)	Dick Doheny 3 Tim Monroe 3 Mike Sroufe 1 Ron Vandermeir Sr. 1
Ford 5 Toyota 3	Fast Track Racing	10	D. L. Wilson 1	Dick Doheny 3 Tim Monroe 3 Mike Sroufe 1 Ron Vandermeir Sr. 1
Toyota 3 Chevrolet 1 Ford 4	Fast Track Racing	12	Tim Monroe 2	Tim Monroe 2 John Szulczewski 1 Daylan Hairston 1 Dick Doheny 3 Jeremy Petty 1
Toyota 3 Chevrolet 1 Ford 4	Fast Track Racing	12	C. J. McLaughlin 1	Tim Monroe 2 John Szulczewski 1 Daylan Hairston 1 Dick Doheny 3 Jeremy Petty 1
Toyota 3 Chevrolet 1 Ford 4	Fast Track Racing	12	Stephanie Moyer 1	Tim Monroe 2 John Szulczewski 1 Daylan Hairston 1 Dick Doheny 3 Jeremy Petty 1
Toyota 3 Chevrolet 1 Ford 4	Fast Track Racing	12	Ryan Roulette 2	Tim Monroe 2 John Szulczewski 1 Daylan Hairston 1 Dick Doheny 3 Jeremy Petty 1
Toyota 3 Chevrolet 1 Ford 4	Fast Track Racing	12	Matt Kemp 1	Tim Monroe 2 John Szulczewski 1 Daylan Hairston 1 Dick Doheny 3 Jeremy Petty 1
Toyota 3 Chevrolet 1 Ford 4	Fast Track Racing	12	D. L. Wilson 1	Tim Monroe 2 John Szulczewski 1 Daylan Hairston 1 Dick Doheny 3 Jeremy Petty 1

=== Limited schedule ===
Manufacturer	Team	No.	Driver	Crew chief	Rounds
Chevrolet	Costner Weaver Motorsports	93	Isaac Johnson	Riley Higgins	1
Chevrolet	CR7 Motorsports	97	Grant Enfinger	Todd Myers	1
Chevrolet	CR7 Motorsports	97	Landen Lewis	Todd Myers	1
Chevrolet	Mullins Racing	3	Landon Pembelton	Austin Simmons	1
Chevrolet	Niece Motorsports	42	Matt Gould	Sean Samuels	1
Chevrolet	Rev Racing	2	Andrés Pérez de Lara	Jamie Jones	4
Chevrolet	Rev Racing	51	Jack Wood	Steve Plattenberger	1
Chevrolet	Veer Motorsports (Note: Entries were fielded in a collaboration with Fast Track Racing.)	66	Jon Garrett	Mike Sroufe	4
Ford	AM Racing	32	Christian Rose	Ryan London	4
Ford	Brad Smith Motorsports	49	Jeff Smith	Jeff Smith	1
Ford	Charles Buchanan Racing	87	Chuck Buchanan Jr.	Craig Wood	1
Ford	Clubb Racing Inc.	03	Alex Clubb	Brian Clubb	2
Ford	Clubb Racing Inc.	03	Casey Carden	Alex Clubb	1
Ford	Greg Van Alst Motorsports	35	Greg Van Alst	Jim Long	2
Ford	Lowden Jackson Motorsports	41	Tyler Reif (R)	Tony Jackson	1
Ford	Lowden Jackson Motorsports	46	R. J. Smotherman	David Jackson	1
Ford	Rette Jones Racing	30	Frankie Muniz	Mark Rette	4
Toyota	KLAS Motorsports	73	Andy Jankowiak	Mike Dayton	1
Toyota	MacZink Racing	65	Jeffery MacZink	Jarod MacZink	1
Toyota	MAN Motorsports	95	Tanner Arms	Tony Ponkauskas	3
Toyota	MAN Motorsports	95	Chris Martin Jr.	Tony Ponkauskas	1
Toyota	Phoenix Racing	1	Jake Finch	Johnny Allen	3
Toyota	Venturini Motorsports	25	Conner Jones	Kevin Reed Jr. 2 Cayden Lapcevich 3	4
Toyota	Venturini Motorsports	25	Toni Breidinger	Kevin Reed Jr. 2 Cayden Lapcevich 3	1
Toyota	Venturini Motorsports	55	Toni Breidinger	Cayden Lapcevich 1 Monon Rahman 3	3
Toyota	Venturini Motorsports	55	Gus Dean	Cayden Lapcevich 1 Monon Rahman 3	1
Toyota	Wayne Peterson Racing	0	Nate Moeller	Wayne Peterson	1
Toyota	Wayne Peterson Racing	06	Nate Moeller	Wayne Peterson 2 Nate Moeller 5	3
Toyota	Wayne Peterson Racing	06	A. J. Moyer	Wayne Peterson 2 Nate Moeller 5	4
Ford 4 Toyota 1	Kimmel Racing 4 Brad Smith Motorsports 1 (Note: It was a Brad Smith Motorsports entry using Kimmel Racing's owner points.)	69	Will Kimmel	Bill Kimmel	1
Ford 4 Toyota 1	Kimmel Racing 4 Brad Smith Motorsports 1	69	Scott Melton	Will Kimmel	1
Ford 4 Toyota 1	Kimmel Racing 4 Brad Smith Motorsports 1	69	Mike Basham	Zach Berthiaume	2
Ford 4 Toyota 1	Kimmel Racing 4 Brad Smith Motorsports 1	69	Brad Smith	Jeff Smith	1
Toyota 1 Chevrolet 1	McGowan Motorsports	17	Landen Lewis	Richard Mason	1
Toyota 1 Chevrolet 1	McGowan Motorsports	17	Kaden Honeycutt	Amber Slagle	1

=== Changes ===
==== Teams ====
- On December 9, 2022, it was announced that the No. 18 car would go back to being owned by Joe Gibbs Racing in 2023. It was owned by Kyle Busch Motorsports in 2022.
- On January 8, 2023, it was announced that Tim Goulet Enterprises would rename to Rise Motorsports in 2023 and continue to field the No. 31 car in the main ARCA Series and the East Series for Rita Goulet (nee Thomason) and Stephen Leicht. On February 13, it was announced that they would run the full East Series season with Rita in 2023. Goulet and Leicht were both scheduled to run the main ARCA/East Series combination race at Bristol. Goulet would end up swapping out with her husband Tim and Leicht did not run the event.
- On January 13, 2023, Rev Racing announced that they would field a full-time car in the East Series again in 2023: the No. 6 driven by Lavar Scott. The team had last fielded a full-time East Series car in 2021 and only fielded part-time cars in the East Series in 2022.
- On January 18, 2023, it was announced that longtime main ARCA Series team Venturini Motorsports would field a full-time car in the East Series for the first time since 2020 in 2023: the No. 15 driven by Sean Hingorani.
- On February 3, 2023, it was announced that Shane Huffman, who was previously the crew chief for Bret Holmes Racing in the Truck and ARCA Series, would form a new ARCA and late model racing team, Pinnacle Racing Group, with spotter Lorin Ranier and former driver Josh Wise and would run full-time in the East Series in 2023, fielding the No. 28 Chevrolet.
- On February 24, 2023, it was revealed that Lowden Jackson Motorsports would debut in the East Series in 2023 after purchasing Fords from David Gilliland Racing which switched to Toyota and renamed to TRICON Garage. The team would field the No. 41 Ford driven by Tyler Reif for the full season.

==== Drivers ====
- On December 6, 2022, it was announced that Zachary Tinkle, who ran the full season in the main ARCA Series aside from the race at Mid-Ohio, would run full-time in the East Series in the No. 11 car for Fast Track Racing in 2023. Fast Track was one of the teams he drove part-time for in 2022.
- On December 9, 2022, it was announced that William Sawalich would drive the No. 18 car part-time in 2023 and the car would go back to being owned by Joe Gibbs Racing. It was owned by Kyle Busch Motorsports in 2022.
- On January 13, 2023, Rev Racing announced that Lavar Scott, who has been a driver for the team in late model racing, would drive full-time for the team in the East Series in 2023 in their No. 6 car. Andrés Pérez de Lara would also drive for Rev full-time in the main ARCA Series in the No. 2 car and was therefore in the four main combination races the East Series had with the main ARCA Series.
- On January 18, 2023, it was announced that Sean Hingorani, who drove part-time in the West Series for Nascimento Motorsports and Bill McAnally Racing in 2022, would drive full-time in the East Series for Venturini Motorsports in 2023 in their No. 15 car. Hingorani also drove the same car full-time in the West Series in 2023, attempting to win both championships in the same year.
- On February 13, 2023, Rise Motorsports announced that Rita Goulet (nee Thomason) would run full-time in the East Series in their No. 31 car in 2023.
- On February 24, 2023, Tyler Reif revealed to Frontstretch that he would run the full season in the East Series in 2023 in the Lowden Jackson Motorsports No. 41 car in addition to running full-time in the West Series for the team. He attempted to win both championships in the same year.

== Schedule ==
The full schedule was announced on November 22. Some race dates were announced before then. There were eight races on the 2023 schedule, up from seven in 2022.

Note: Races highlighted in gold are combination events with the ARCA Menards Series.

No	Race title	Track	Location	Date
1	Pensacola 200	Five Flags Speedway	Pensacola, Florida	March 25
2	General Tire 125	Dover Motor Speedway	Dover, Delaware	April 28
3	Music City 200	Nashville Fairgrounds Speedway	Nashville, Tennessee	May 13
4	Dutch Boy 150	Flat Rock Speedway	Ash Township, Michigan	May 20
5	Calypso Lemonade 150	Iowa Speedway	Newton, Iowa	July 15
6	Reese's 200	Lucas Oil Indianapolis Raceway Park	Brownsburg, Indiana	August 11
7	Sprecher 150	Milwaukee Mile	West Allis, Wisconsin	August 27
8	Bush's Beans 200	Bristol Motor Speedway	Bristol, Tennessee	September 14

=== Schedule changes ===
- On August 9, 2022, Mark Kristl from Frontstretch reported that Flat Rock Speedway could be added to the East Series schedule in 2023. This was officially announced by ARCA on November 18. The race at Flat Rock, which was held on May 20, replaced the race at New Smyrna Speedway, which had been the season-opener for the East Series from 2014 to 2022.
- On November 11, 2022, it was announced that the main ARCA Series race at Lucas Oil Indianapolis Raceway Park would be a combination race with the East Series in 2023, giving the series a fourth combination race on top of the three returning ones from 2022 (Iowa, Milwaukee and Bristol).

=== Broadcasting ===
After previously only broadcasting about half of the main ARCA Series races for several years, usually only the races that were on the same weekend at the same track as a NASCAR Cup, Xfinity and/or Truck race, Fox will broadcast all 20 main ARCA Series races in 2023 and this includes all four combination races with the East Series (Iowa, IRP, Milwaukee and Bristol). Previously, Bristol was the only East Series race televised on Fox as they were also broadcasting the Truck Series race there on that weekend.

== Results and standings ==
=== Race results ===
No.	Race	Pole position	Most laps led	Winning driver	Manufacturer	No.	Winning team	Report
1	Pensacola 200	William Sawalich	William Sawalich	William Sawalich	Toyota	18	Joe Gibbs Racing	Report
2	General Tire 125	William Sawalich	Jake Finch	Jake Finch	Toyota	20	Venturini Motorsports	Report
3	Music City 200	William Sawalich	William Sawalich	Luke Fenhaus	Chevrolet	28	Pinnacle Racing Group	Report
4	Dutch Boy 150	Sean Hingorani	Sean Hingorani	William Sawalich	Toyota	18	Joe Gibbs Racing	Report
5	Calypso Lemonade 150	William Sawalich	William Sawalich	Luke Fenhaus	Chevrolet	28	Pinnacle Racing Group	Report
6	Reese's 200	Jesse Love	Jesse Love	Jesse Love	Toyota	20	Venturini Motorsports	Report
7	Sprecher 150	William Sawalich	William Sawalich	William Sawalich	Toyota	18	Joe Gibbs Racing	Report
8	Bush's Beans 200	William Sawalich	Jesse Love	William Sawalich	Toyota	18	Joe Gibbs Racing	Report

=== Drivers' championship ===
Notes:

- The pole winner also receives one bonus point, similar to the previous ARCA points system used until 2019 and unlike NASCAR.
- Additionally, after groups of five races of the season, drivers that compete in all five races receive fifty additional points. This points bonus will be given after the race at Iowa.
  - William Sawalich, Luke Fenhaus, Lavar Scott, Zachary Tinkle, Tim Monroe and Dale Shearer received this points bonus for having competed in the first five races of the season (Five Flags, Dover, Nashville Fairgrounds, Flat Rock, and Iowa).

(key) Bold – Pole position awarded by time. Italics – Pole position set by final practice results or rainout. * – Most laps led.

Pos	Driver	FIF	DOV	NSV	FRS	IOW	IRP	MLW	BRI	Points
1	William Sawalich **(R)**	**1****	4	**2***	1	**2***	4	**1***	**1**	465
2	Luke Fenhaus **(R)**	2	3	1	5	1	2	6	29	412
3	Lavar Scott **(R)**	5	5	6	2	4	5	8	17	401
4	Zachary Tinkle	7	6	7	6	11	13	13	13	376
5	Tim Monroe	11	15	9	7	17	22	15	25	331
6	Dale Shearer	14	14	10	11	18	19	19	24	323
7	Sean Hingorani **(R)**	4	10	3	**3***		3	3	15	322
8	Conner Jones		9			8	6	4	6	238
9	Brad Smith	Wth	11	12	13	15	21	20	30	236
10	Jesse Love					3	**1***	2	2*	227
11	Jake Finch	3	1*	5				9	4	203
12	Andrés Pérez de Lara					6	8	7	3	202
13	Christian Rose					7	10	11	8	190
14	Rita Goulet **(R)**	15	12	11		16	16	17	QL	177
15	Frankie Muniz					9	11	12	23	171
16	Jon Garrett					10	14	21	26	155
17	A. J. Moyer					14	17	16	27	152
18	Toni Breidinger		7			5	9		12	143
19	Nate Moeller	13		15	14		23			111
20	Tanner Arms	8		8					11	105
21	Dallas Frueh	12			15			22		83
22	Brayton Laster			14		20	20			78
23	Greg Van Alst						7		5	76
24	Alex Clubb					13		23	22	74
25	Ed Pompa	10	8							70
26	Landen Lewis		2						20	68
27	Ryan Roulette				12				18	58
28	D. L. Wilson						15		16	57
29	Gio Ruggiero			4						40
30	Billy Venturini				4					40
31	Grant Enfinger							5		39
32	Tyler Reif **(R)**	6								38
33	Landon Pembelton								7	37
34	Will Kimmel				8					36
35	R. J. Smotherman	9								35
36	Jeffery MacZink				9					35
37	Jack Wood								9	35
38	Derrick McGrew Jr.				10					34
39	Gus Dean							10		34
40	Andy Jankowiak								10	34
41	Mike Basham						24		32	32
42	Scott Melton					12				32
43	Isaac Johnson						12			32
44	C. J. McLaughlin		13							31
45	Stephanie Moyer			13						31
46	Rick Redig-Tackman							14		30
47	Caleb Costner								14	30
48	Jeff Smith				16					28
49	Chris Martin Jr.						18			26
50	Ron Vandermeir Jr.							18		26
51	Matt Kemp					19				25
52	Chuck Buchanan Jr.								19	25
53	Kaden Honeycutt								21	23
54	Casey Carden						25			19
55	Tim Goulet								28	16
56	Matt Gould								31	13
	Jalen Mack					Wth				
	Tony Cosentino					Wth				

== See also ==
- 2023 NASCAR Cup Series
- 2023 NASCAR Xfinity Series
- 2023 NASCAR Craftsman Truck Series
- 2023 ARCA Menards Series
- 2023 ARCA Menards Series West
- 2023 NASCAR Whelen Modified Tour
- 2023 NASCAR Pinty's Series
- 2023 NASCAR Mexico Series
- 2023 NASCAR Whelen Euro Series
- 2023 NASCAR Brasil Sprint Race
- 2023 SRX Series
- 2023 CARS Tour
- 2023 SMART Modified Tour
- 2023 ASA STARS National Tour
