= 2025 Berlin ARCA 200 =

7th race of the 2025 ARCA Menards Series

Race details
- Race 7 of 20 of the 2025 ARCA Menards Series
- Date: June 14, 2025
- Official name: 25th Annual Berlin ARCA 200
- Location: Berlin Raceway in Marne, Michigan
- Course: Permanent racing facility
- Course length: 0.438 miles (0.705 km)
- Distance: 200 laps, 87.6 mi (140 km)
- Scheduled distance: 200 laps, 87.6 mi (140 km)
- Average speed: 53.770 mph (86.534 km/h)

Pole position
Driver	Treyten Lapcevich	Nitro Motorsports
- Time: 16.835

Most laps led
Driver	Treyten Lapcevich	Nitro Motorsports
- Laps: 200

Winner
No. 70	Treyten Lapcevich	Nitro Motorsports

Television in the United States
- Network: FS1
- Announcers: Eric Brennan and Phil Parsons

Radio in the United States
- Radio: ARCA Racing Network

The 2025 Berlin ARCA 200 was the 7th stock car race of the 2025 ARCA Menards Series season, and the 25th iteration of the event. The race was held on Saturday, June 14, 2025, at Berlin Raceway in Marne, Michigan, a 0.438 mile (0.705 km) permanent tri-oval shaped racetrack. The race took the scheduled 200 laps to complete. Treyten Lapcevich, driving for Nitro Motorsports, would pull off an incredible performance, winning the pole and leading every lap of the race to earn his first career ARCA Menards Series win in his second start. He also became the first Canadian driver to win an ARCA race since 2014. To fill out the podium, Max Reaves, driving for Joe Gibbs Racing in his series debut, and Lawless Alan, driving for Venturini Motorsports, would finish 2nd and 3rd, respectively.

== Report ==
=== Entry list ===
- (R) denotes rookie driver.

#	Driver	Team	Make	Sponsor
01	Jeff Smith	Brad Smith Motorsports	Ford	Gary's Speed Shop
03	Alex Clubb	Clubb Racing Inc.	Ford	Racing With Mason
3	Willie Mullins	Mullins Racing	Toyota	DP Custom Truck and Chrome
5	Michael Clayton	City Garage Motorsports	Ford	Extreme Graffix / City Garage
06	Brayton Laster (R)	Wayne Peterson Racing	Ford	AM Manufacturing Company / THDesigns
6	Lavar Scott	Rev Racing	Chevrolet	Max Siegel Inc.
9	Don Thompson	Fast Track Racing	Toyota	I Love/Hate Everything Card Game
10	Matt Kemp	Fast Track Racing	Ford	CIS Agency / ELHDetailing.com
11	Tony Cosentino	Fast Track Racing	Ford	Tamayo Sports Florida
12	Trevor Ward	Fast Track Racing	Ford	Double "H" Ranch
18	Max Reaves	Joe Gibbs Racing	Toyota	Cook Out
20	Lawless Alan	Venturini Motorsports	Toyota	AutoChargIt.com
25	Mason Mitchell	Venturini Motorsports	Toyota	Pro-Seed USA
28	Brenden Queen (R)	Pinnacle Racing Group	Chevrolet	BestRepair.net
31	Tim Goulet	Rise Motorsports	Toyota	RochelleBradley.com
48	Brad Smith	Brad Smith Motorsports	Ford	Gary's Speed Shop
55	Isabella Robusto (R)	Venturini Motorsports	Toyota	Yahoo
67	Mandy Chick	Maples Motorsports	Chevrolet	Maples Motorsports
70	Treyten Lapcevich	Nitro Motorsports	Toyota	Bare Knuckle Fighting Championship
85	Becca Monopoli	City Garage Motorsports	Ford	Orlando Health
86	Chris Golden	Clubb Racing Inc.	Ford	Yavapai Bottle Gas
97	Jason Kitzmiller	CR7 Motorsports	Chevrolet	A.L.L. Construction / Carter Cat
98	Dale Shearer	Shearer Speed Racing	Toyota	Shearer Speed Racing
99	Michael Maples	Maples Motorsports	Chevrolet	Don Ray Petroleum / Maples Motorsports
Official entry list

== Practice ==
The first and only practice session was held on Saturday, June 14, at 3:00 PM EST, and would last for 45 minutes. Max Reaves, driving for Joe Gibbs Racing, would set the fastest time in the session, with a lap of 16.911, and a speed of 93.241 mph (150.057 km/h).

Pos.	#	Driver	Team	Make	Time	Speed
1	18	Max Reaves	Joe Gibbs Racing	Toyota	16.911	93.241
2	55	Isabella Robusto (R)	Venturini Motorsports	Toyota	17.063	92.410
3	20	Lawless Alan	Venturini Motorsports	Toyota	17.108	92.167
Full practice results

== Qualifying ==
Qualifying was held on Saturday, June 14, at 4:30 PM EST. The qualifying system used is a single-car, two-lap system with one round. Drivers will be on track by themselves and will have two laps to post a qualifying time, and whoever sets the fastest time will win the pole.

Treyten Lapcevich, driving for Nitro Motorsports, would score the pole for the race, with a lap of 16.835, and a speed of 93.662 mph (150.734 km/h).

=== Qualifying results ===
Pos.	#	Driver	Team	Make	Time	Speed
1	70	Treyten Lapcevich	Nitro Motorsports	Toyota	16.835	93.662
2	6	Lavar Scott	Rev Racing	Chevrolet	16.890	93.357
3	28	Brenden Queen (R)	Pinnacle Racing Group	Chevrolet	16.929	93.142
4	18	Max Reaves	Joe Gibbs Racing	Toyota	16.944	93.059
5	55	Isabella Robusto (R)	Venturini Motorsports	Toyota	17.062	92.416
6	25	Mason Mitchell	Venturini Motorsports	Toyota	17.070	92.373
7	20	Lawless Alan	Venturini Motorsports	Toyota	17.113	92.140
8	97	Jason Kitzmiller	CR7 Motorsports	Chevrolet	17.232	91.504
9	11	Tony Cosentino	Fast Track Racing	Ford	17.260	91.356
10	10	Matt Kemp	Fast Track Racing	Ford	17.377	90.741
11	3	Willie Mullins	Mullins Racing	Toyota	17.625	89.464
12	85	Becca Monopoli	City Garage Motorsports	Ford	18.010	87.551
13	03	Alex Clubb	Clubb Racing Inc.	Ford	18.341	85.971
14	67	Mandy Chick	Maples Motorsports	Chevrolet	18.459	85.422
15	99	Michael Maples	Maples Motorsports	Chevrolet	19.004	82.972
16	06	Brayton Laster (R)	Wayne Peterson Racing	Ford	19.138	82.391
17	31	Tim Goulet	Rise Motorsports	Toyota	19.390	81.320
18	86	Chris Golden	Clubb Racing Inc.	Ford	19.410	81.236
19	5	Michael Clayton	City Garage Motorsports	Ford	19.713	79.988
20	12	Trevor Ward	Fast Track Racing	Ford	20.275	77.771
21	98	Dale Shearer	Shearer Speed Racing	Toyota	21.155	74.536
22	9	Don Thompson	Fast Track Racing	Toyota	21.352	73.848
23	01	Jeff Smith	Brad Smith Motorsports	Ford	21.453	73.500
24	48	Brad Smith	Brad Smith Motorsports	Ford	22.715	69.417
Official qualifying results

== Race results ==
Fin	St	#	Driver	Team	Make	Laps	Led	Status	Pts
1	1	70	Treyten Lapcevich	Nitro Motorsports	Toyota	200	200	Running	49
2	4	18	Max Reaves	Joe Gibbs Racing	Toyota	200	0	Running	42
3	7	20	Lawless Alan	Venturini Motorsports	Toyota	200	0	Running	41
4	3	28	Brenden Queen (R)	Pinnacle Racing Group	Chevrolet	200	0	Running	40
5	2	6	Lavar Scott	Rev Racing	Chevrolet	200	0	Running	39
6	5	55	Isabella Robusto (R)	Venturini Motorsports	Toyota	200	0	Running	38
7	6	25	Mason Mitchell	Venturini Motorsports	Toyota	200	0	Running	37
8	8	97	Jason Kitzmiller	CR7 Motorsports	Chevrolet	200	0	Running	36
9	10	10	Matt Kemp	Fast Track Racing	Ford	200	0	Running	35
10	11	3	Willie Mullins	Mullins Racing	Toyota	199	0	Running	34
11	12	85	Becca Monopoli	City Garage Motorsports	Ford	197	0	Running	33
12	13	03	Alex Clubb	Clubb Racing Inc.	Ford	192	0	Running	32
13	15	99	Michael Maples	Maples Motorsports	Chevrolet	186	0	Running	31
14	17	31	Tim Goulet	Rise Motorsports	Toyota	186	0	Running	30
15	24	48	Brad Smith	Brad Smith Motorsports	Ford	183	0	Running	29
16	9	11	Tony Cosentino	Fast Track Racing	Ford	148	0	Mechanical	28
17	16	06	Brayton Laster (R)	Wayne Peterson Racing	Ford	80	0	Mechanical	27
18	14	67	Mandy Chick	Maples Motorsports	Chevrolet	76	0	Mechanical	26
19	18	86	Chris Golden	Clubb Racing Inc.	Ford	72	0	Mechanical	25
20	21	98	Dale Shearer	Shearer Speed Racing	Toyota	26	0	Mechanical	24
21	22	9	Don Thompson	Fast Track Racing	Toyota	24	0	Mechanical	23
22	19	5	Michael Clayton	City Garage Motorsports	Ford	12	0	Mechanical	22
23	20	12	Trevor Ward	Fast Track Racing	Ford	7	0	Mechanical	21
24	23	01	Jeff Smith	Brad Smith Motorsports	Ford	2	0	Mechanical	20
Official race results

== Standings after the race ==
Drivers' Championship standings

	Pos	Driver	Points
	1	Brenden Queen	327
1	2	Lawless Alan	320 (–7)
1	3	Lavar Scott	320 (–7)
1	4	Jason Kitzmiller	269 (–58)
1	5	Andy Jankowiak	262 (–65)
1	6	Isabella Robusto	233 (–94)
1	7	Thad Moffitt	227 (–100)
	8	Alex Clubb	225 (–102)
	9	Michael Maples	218 (–109)
	10	Brayton Laster	207 (–120)

- Note: Only the first 10 positions are included for the driver standings.

Previous race: 2025 Henry Ford Health 200	ARCA Menards Series; 2025 season	Next race: 2025 Shore Lunch 250
