= 2022 Reese's 200 =

Eleventh race of the 2022 ARCA Menards Series

Race details
- Race 11 of 20 of the 2022 ARCA Menards Series; Race 6 of 10 of the 2022 Sioux Chief Showdown
- Date: July 29, 2022
- Official name: 14th Annual Reese's 200
- Location: Lucas Oil Indianapolis Raceway Park, Brownsburg, Indiana
- Course: Permanent racing facility
- Course length: 0.686 miles (1.104 km)
- Distance: 200 laps, 137.2 mi (220.8 km)
- Scheduled distance: 200 laps, 137.2 mi (220.8 km)
- Average speed: 73.118 mph (117.672 km/h)

Pole position
Driver	Sammy Smith	Kyle Busch Motorsports
- Time: 21.922

Most laps led
Driver	Chandler Smith	Venturini Motorsports
- Laps: 111

Winner
No. 15	Chandler Smith	Venturini Motorsports

Television in the United States
- Network: Fox Sports 1
- Announcers: Jamie Little, Phil Parsons, and Michael Waltrip

Radio in the United States
- Radio: Motor Racing Network

The 2022 Reese's 200 was the eleventh stock car race of the 2022 ARCA Menards Series season, the sixth race of the 2022 Sioux Chief Showdown, and the 14th iteration of the event. The race was held on Friday, July 29, 2022, in Brownsburg, Indiana at Lucas Oil Indianapolis Raceway Park, a 0.686 mile (1.104 km) permanent oval-shaped racetrack. The race took the scheduled 200 laps to complete. Chandler Smith, driving for Venturini Motorsports, dominated most of the race, and earned his 10th career ARCA Menards Series win, along with his first of the season. Sammy Smith also dominated a portion of the race, leading 89 laps. To fill out the podium, Smith, driving for Kyle Busch Motorsports, and Taylor Gray, driving for David Gilliland Racing, would finish 2nd and 3rd, respectively.

== Background ==
Lucas Oil Indianapolis Raceway Park (formerly Indianapolis Raceway Park, O'Reilly Raceway Park at Indianapolis, and Lucas Oil Raceway) is an auto racing facility in Brownsburg, Indiana, United States, about 10 miles (16 km) west of Downtown Indianapolis. It includes a 0.686-mile (1.104 km) oval track, a 2.5-mile (4.0 km) road course (which has fallen into disrepair and is no longer used), and a 4,400-foot (1,300 m) drag strip which is among the premier drag racing venues in the world. The complex receives about 500,000 visitors annually.

=== Entry list ===
- (R) denotes rookie driver

#	Driver	Team	Make	Sponsor
01	Tim Monroe	Fast Track Racing	Chevrolet	Universal Technical Institute
02	Dylan Smith	Young's Motorsports	Chevrolet	Maestro's
2	Nick Sanchez	Rev Racing	Chevrolet	Gainbridge, Max Siegel Inc.
03	Alex Clubb	Clubb Racing Inc.	Ford	Clubb Racing Inc.
06	Zachary Tinkle	Wayne Peterson Racing	Toyota	GreatRailing.com
6	Rajah Caruth (R)	Rev Racing	Chevrolet	Gainbridge, Max Siegel Inc.
7	Colton Collins	CCM Racing	Chevrolet	Coble Enterprises
10	Chris Martin Jr.	Fast Track Racing	Toyota	Glenwood Oil and Gas
11	Bryce Haugeberg	Fast Track Racing	Chevrolet	Magnum Contracting
12	D. L. Wilson	Fast Track Racing	Toyota	Fast Track Racing
15	Chandler Smith	Venturini Motorsports	Toyota	QuickTie, Charge Me
17	Taylor Gray	David Gilliland Racing	Ford	Ford Performance
18	Sammy Smith (R)	Kyle Busch Motorsports	Toyota	TMC Transportation
20	Jesse Love (R)	Venturini Motorsports	Toyota	Crescent Tools
23	Connor Mosack	Bret Holmes Racing	Chevrolet	Nic Tailor Custom Underwear
25	Toni Breidinger (R)	Venturini Motorsports	Toyota	Pit Viper Sunglasses
30	Amber Balcaen (R)	Rette Jones Racing	Ford	ICON Direct
35	Greg Van Alst	Greg Van Alst Motorsports	Ford	CB Fabricating, Top Choice Fence
42	Christian Rose	Cook Racing Technologies	Chevrolet	West Virginia Tourism
43	Daniel Dye (R)	GMS Racing	Chevrolet	KIX County, Solar Fit
48	Brad Smith	Brad Smith Motorsports	Chevrolet	PSST...Copraya Websites
55	Tom Hessert III	Venturini Motorsports	Toyota	HessertCars.com
74	Mandy Chick	Team Chick Motorsports	Toyota	Dynamic Drivelines
95	Dylan Fetcho	MAN Motorsports	Toyota	Hunter Industrial Fans
Official entry list

== Practice ==
The only 45-minute practice session is scheduled to be held on Friday, July 29, at 12:30 PM EST. Daniel Dye, driving for GMS Racing, was the fastest in the session, with a lap of 22.009, and an average speed of 112.214 mph (180.591 km/h).

Pos.	#	Driver	Team	Make	Time	Speed
1	43	Daniel Dye (R)	GMS Racing	Chevrolet	22.009	112.214
2	17	Taylor Gray	David Gilliland Racing	Ford	22.066	111.914
3	15	Chandler Smith	Venturini Motorsports	Toyota	22.079	111.848
Full practice results

== Qualifying ==
Qualifying was held on Friday, July 29, at 2:15 PM EST. The qualifying system used is a single-car, two-lap system with only one round. Whoever sets the fastest time in the round wins the pole. Sammy Smith, driving for Kyle Busch Motorsports, scored the pole for the race, with a lap of 21.923, and an average speed of 112.654 mph (181.299 km/h).

Pos.	#	Name	Team	Make	Time	Speed
1	18	Sammy Smith (R)	Kyle Busch Motorsports	Toyota	21.923	112.654
2	20	Jesse Love (R)	Venturini Motorsports	Toyota	21.929	112.618
3	15	Chandler Smith	Venturini Motorsports	Toyota	22.001	112.244
4	17	Taylor Gray	David Gilliland Racing	Ford	22.008	112.209
5	2	Nick Sanchez	Rev Racing	Chevrolet	22.026	112.107
6	43	Daniel Dye (R)	GMS Racing	Chevrolet	22.077	111.858
7	6	Rajah Caruth (R)	Rev Racing	Chevrolet	22.330	110.581
8	02	Dylan Smith	Young's Motorsports	Chevrolet	22.438	110.063
9	55	Tom Hessert III	Venturini Motorsports	Toyota	22.507	109.721
10	42	Christian Rose	Cook Racing Technologies	Chevrolet	22.578	109.381
11	23	Connor Mosack	Bret Holmes Racing	Chevrolet	22.651	109.019
12	95	Dylan Fetcho	MAN Motorsports	Toyota	22.718	108.702
13	35	Greg Van Alst	Greg Van Alst Motorsports	Ford	22.731	108.645
14	25	Toni Breidinger (R)	Venturini Motorsports	Toyota	22.863	108.017
15	30	Amber Balcaen (R)	Rette Jones Racing	Ford	23.479	105.148
16	74	Mandy Chick	Team Chick Motorsports	Toyota	23.522	104.991
17	7	Colton Collins	CCM Racing	Chevrolet	23.695	104.229
18	11	Bryce Haugeberg	Fast Track Racing	Chevrolet	23.776	103.874
19	03	Alex Clubb	Clubb Racing Inc.	Ford	24.107	102.443
20	12	D. L. Wilson	Fast Track Racing	Toyota	24.824	99.484
21	10	Chris Martin Jr.	Fast Track Racing	Toyota	24.929	99.061
22	01	Tim Monroe	Fast Track Racing	Chevrolet	26.136	94.494
23	48	Brad Smith	Brad Smith Motorsports	Chevrolet	28.613	86.307
24	06	Zachary Tinkle	Wayne Peterson Racing	Toyota	-	-
Official qualifying results

== Race results ==
Fin.	St	#	Driver	Team	Make	Laps	Led	Status	Pts
1	3	15	Chandler Smith	Venturini Motorsports	Toyota	200	111	Running	48
2	1	18	Sammy Smith	Kyle Busch Motorsports	Toyota	200	89	Running	44
3	4	17	Taylor Gray	David Gilliland Racing	Ford	200	0	Running	41
4	6	43	Daniel Dye (R)	GMS Racing	Chevrolet	200	0	Running	40
5	11	23	Connor Mosack	Bret Holmes Racing	Chevrolet	200	0	Running	39
6	2	20	Jesse Love (R)	Venturini Motorsports	Toyota	200	0	Running	38
7	5	2	Nick Sanchez	Rev Racing	Chevrolet	199	0	Running	37
8	7	6	Rajah Caruth (R)	Rev Racing	Chevrolet	199	0	Running	36
9	8	02	Dylan Smith	Young's Motorsports	Chevrolet	199	0	Running	35
10	13	35	Greg Van Alst	Greg Van Alst Motorsports	Ford	198	0	Running	34
11	9	55	Tom Hessert III	Venturini Motorsports	Toyota	198	0	Running	33
12	12	95	Dylan Fetcho	MAN Motorsports	Toyota	198	0	Running	32
13	18	11	Bryce Haugeberg	Fast Track Racing	Toyota	197	0	Running	31
14	17	7	Colton Collins	CCM Racing	Chevrolet	193	0	Running	30
15	24	06	Zachary Tinkle	Wayne Peterson Racing	Toyota	179	0	Running	29
16	23	48	Brad Smith	Brad Smith Motorsports	Chevrolet	125	0	Vibration	28
17	14	25	Toni Breidinger (R)	Venturini Motorsports	Toyota	122	0	Accident	27
18	16	74	Mandy Chick	Team Chick Motorsports	Toyota	120	0	Accident	26
19	20	12	D. L. Wilson	Fast Track Racing	Toyota	108	0	Radiator	25
20	10	42	Christian Rose	Cook Racing Technologies	Chevrolet	98	0	Accident	24
21	15	30	Amber Balcaen (R)	Rette Jones Racing	Ford	79	0	Accident	23
22	21	10	Chris Martin Jr.	Fast Track Racing	Toyota	45	0	Overheating	22
23	19	03	Alex Clubb	Clubb Racing Inc.	Ford	29	0	Overheating	21
24	22	01	Tim Monroe	Fast Track Racing	Chevrolet	3	0	Brakes	20
Official race results

== Standings after the race ==
Drivers' Championship standings

	Pos	Driver	Points
	1	Rajah Caruth	516
	2	Nick Sanchez	515 (-1)
	3	Daniel Dye	511 (-5)
	4	Toni Breidinger	443 (-73)
	5	Greg Van Alst	442 (-74)
	6	Amber Balcaen	415 (-101)
	7	Brad Smith	372 (-144)
1	8	Sammy Smith	302 (-214)
1	9	Zachary Tinkle	295 (-221)
	10	Taylor Gray	290 (-226)

- Note: Only the first 10 positions are included for the driver standings.

Previous race: 2022 General Tire Delivers 200	ARCA Menards Series; 2022 season	Next race: 2022 Henry Ford Health 200
