= Isaac Johnson (racing driver) =

American racing driver (born 2000)

- Born: May 12, 2000 (age 26); Martinsville, Indiana, U.S.

ARCA Menards Series career
- 6 races run over 2 years
- Best finish: 30th (2024)
- First race: 2023 Reese's 200 (Indianapolis)
- Last race: 2024 Reese's 150 (Kansas)
Wins	Top tens	Poles
0	3	0

ARCA Menards Series East career
- 2 races run over 2 years
- Best finish: 43rd (2023)
- First race: 2023 Reese's 200 (Indianapolis)
- Last race: 2024 Circle City 200 (IRP)
Wins	Top tens	Poles
0	1	0

ARCA Menards Series West career
- 1 race run over 1 year
- Best finish: 70th (2024)
- First race: 2024 General Tire 150 (Phoenix)
Wins	Top tens	Poles
0	0	0
- Statistics up to date as of October 5, 2024.

Isaac Johnson (born May 12, 2000) is an American professional stock car racing driver who last competed part-time in the ARCA Menards Series, driving the No. 34 Ford Mustang for Greg Van Alst Motorsports.

== Racing career ==
Johnson first began racing as a child, competing in online simulation racing before progressing up to go-karts.

In 2021, Johnson made select starts in the Kenyon Midget Series, getting a best finish of tenth at Anderson Speedway. He would make three more starts in the series the following year, getting two top-ten finishes at Anderson and Gas City I-69 Speedway with a best finish of fifth at Anderson after starting last. It was also during this year that he would compete in the Southern All Star Dirt Racing Series and the Ultimate Heart of America Super Late Model Series.

In 2023, Johnson would race in the Carolina Pro Late Model Series, getting a best finish of fifth at Franklin County Speedway. In August of that year, it was announced that he would make his ARCA Menards Series debut at Lucas Oil Indianapolis Raceway Park, driving the No. 93 Chevrolet for Costner Weaver Motorsports. It will also be his debut in the ARCA Menards Series East, as it is a companion event with the main ARCA series. Johnson finished the race in twelfth.

In 2024, Johnson participated in pre-season testing for the ARCA Menards Series at Daytona International Speedway driving for Greg Van Alst Motorsports in the No. 34 Ford. Several days after the test, it was reveled that Johnson would drive the No. 34 for Van Alst in the season opening race. He started in ninth but went on to finish eighteenth after being collected in a multi-car crash on the final lap of the race. Johnson then entered in the following race at Phoenix Raceway, still driving the No. 34 for Van Alst. After placing 21st in the lone practice session, he qualified for the race in 27th and finished in 24th.

== Personal life ==
Johnson works as a sales engineer for George E. Booth Company, which also serves as his sponsor when he races.

== Motorsports results ==
=== Stock car career summary ===
Season	Series	Team	Races	Wins	Top 5	Top 10	Points	Position
2023	ARCA Menards Series East	Costner Weaver Motorsports	1	0	0	0	32	43rd
2023	ARCA Menards Series	Costner Weaver Motorsports	1	0	0	0	32	88th
2024	ARCA Menards Series West	Greg Van Alst Motorsports	1	0	0	0	20	70th
2024	ARCA Menards Series East	Greg Van Alst Motorsports	1	0	0	1	34	46th
2024	ARCA Menards Series	Greg Van Alst Motorsports	5	0	0	3	153	30th

=== ARCA Menards Series ===
(key) (Bold – Pole position awarded by qualifying time. Italics – Pole position earned by points standings or practice time. * – Most laps led.)

ARCA Menards Series results
Year	Team	No.	Make	1	2	3	4	5	6	7	8	9	10	11	12	13	14	15	16	17	18	19	20	AMSC	Pts	Ref
2023	Costner Weaver Motorsports	93	Chevy	DAY	PHO	TAL	KAN	CLT	BLN	ELK	MOH	IOW	POC	MCH	IRP; 12	GLN	ISF	MLW	DSF	KAN	BRI	SLM	TOL	88th	32	
2024	Greg Van Alst Motorsports	34	Ford	DAY; 18	PHO; 24	TAL	DOV	KAN	CLT	IOW	MOH	BLN	IRP; 10	SLM; 6	ELK	MCH	ISF	MLW	DSF	GLN	BRI	KAN; 9	TOL	30th	153	

==== ARCA Menards Series East ====
ARCA Menards Series East results
Year	Team	No.	Make	1	2	3	4	5	6	7	8	AMSEC	Pts	Ref
2023	Costner Weaver Motorsports	93	Chevy	FIF	DOV	NSV	FRS	IOW	IRP; 12	MLW	BRI	43rd	32	
2024	Greg Van Alst Motorsports	34	Ford	FIF	DOV	NSV	FRS	IOW	IRP; 10	MLW	BRI	46th	34	

==== ARCA Menards Series West ====
ARCA Menards Series West results
Year	Team	No.	Make	1	2	3	4	5	6	7	8	9	10	11	12	AMSWC	Pts	Ref
2024	Greg Van Alst Motorsports	34	Ford	PHO; 24	KER	PIR	SON	IRW	IRW	SHA	TRI	MAD	AAS	KER	PHO	70th	20	
