= Jeff Smith (American racing driver) =

American racing driver (born 1963)

- Born: August 20, 1963 (age 63); Macomb, Michigan, U.S.

ARCA Menards Series career
- 4 races run over 3 years
- Best finish: 66th (2023)
- First race: 1987 Grand Auto Parts 150 (Rockford)
- Last race: 2025 Berlin ARCA 200 (Berlin)
Wins	Top tens	Poles
0	0	0

ARCA Menards Series East career
- 2 races run over 2 years
- Best finish: 48th (2023)
- First race: 2023 Dutch Boy 150 (Flat Rock)
- Last race: 2025 Dutch Boy 150 (Flat Rock)
Wins	Top tens	Poles
0	0	0
- Statistics up to date as of May 17, 2025.

Jeff Smith (born August 20, 1963) is an American professional stock car racing driver and crew chief who last competed part-time in the ARCA Menards Series and the ARCA Menards Series East, driving the No. 01 Ford for Fast Track Racing in collaboration with Brad Smith Motorsports. He is the older brother of current ARCA Menards Series driver Brad Smith.

== Racing career ==
Smith ran one ARCA Permatex SuperCar Series race at Flat Rock Speedway driving for his brother's team in the No. 67 Chrysler, where he would finish 28th and last due to engine issues.

Since 1988, Smith has worked as a crew member and crew chief for his brother and his team. In 2022, he gained attention at the Milwaukee Mile where he served as the only pit crew member for Brad, who was making his four-hundredth start in the now ARCA Menards Series, and had performed a pit stop for him during the race, which was filmed and uploaded onto Facebook by Dan Margetta, who was in attendance at the event; Brad would finish 21st after running 136 of the 150 laps.

In 2023, it was revealed on the entry list for the ARCA Menards Series East race at Flat Rock Speedway that Smith would run the No. 49 Ford for Brad Smith Motorsports, which would be his first professional start in any stock car series since 1987. Smith would finish sixteenth and last after one lap due to clutch issues. He would later make his return to the main ARCA Menards Series driving the No. 49 Chevrolet at Berlin Raceway, where he would finish seventeenth after spinning out two laps into the race. He would return at Michigan International Speedway, where he would finish 23rd due to mechanical issues at the start of the race.

In 2025, Smith returned to driving at Flat Rock Speedway, driving the No. 01 Ford for Fast Track Racing in collaboration with Brad Smith Motorsports, where he finished in fifteenth due to mechanical issues. He then returned to the main ARCA series at Berlin Raceway, once again driving the No. 01, where he finished in 24th after running only two laps, once again due to mechanical issues.

== Motorsports career results ==
=== ARCA Menards Series ===
(key) (Bold – Pole position awarded by qualifying time. Italics – Pole position earned by points standings or practice time. * – Most laps led.)

ARCA Menards Series results
Year	Team	No.	Make	1	2	3	4	5	6	7	8	9	10	11	12	13	14	15	16	17	18	19	20	AMSC	Pts	Ref
1987	Smith Brothers Racing	67	Chrysler	DAY	ATL	TAL	DEL	ACS	TOL	ROC	POC	FRS	KIL	TAL	FRS; 28	ISF	INF	DSF	SLM	ATL				N/A	0	
2023	Brad Smith Motorsports	49	Chevy	DAY	PHO	TAL	KAN	CLT	BLN; 17	ELK	MOH	IOW	POC	MCH; 23	IRP	GLN	ISF	MLW	DSF	KAN	BRI	SLM	TOL	66th	48	
2025	Brad Smith Motorsports	01	Ford	DAY	PHO	TAL	KAN	CLT	MCH	BLN; 24	ELK	LRP	DOV	IRP	IOW	GLN	ISF	MAD	DSF	BRI	SLM	KAN	TOL	130th	20	

==== ARCA Menards Series East ====
ARCA Menards Series East results
Year	Team	No.	Make	1	2	3	4	5	6	7	8	AMSEC	Pts	Ref
2023	Brad Smith Motorsports	49	Ford	FIF	DOV	NSV	FRS; 16	IOW	IRP	MLW	BRI	48th	28	
2025	Brad Smith Motorsports	01	Ford	FIF	CAR	NSV	FRS; 15	DOV	IRP	IOW	BRI	60th	29	

^{*} Season still in progress
