= Derrick McGrew Jr. =

American racing driver

- Born: July 10, 2007 (age 19); Ballston Spa, New York, U.S.

ARCA Menards Series East career
- 1 race run over 1 year
- Best finish: 38th (2023)
- First race: 2023 Dutch Boy 150 (Flat Rock)
Wins	Top tens	Poles
0	1	0
- Statistics up to date as of September 16, 2024.

Derrick McGrew Jr. (born July 10, 2007) is an American professional stock car racing driver who last competed part-time in the ARCA Menards Series East, driving the No. 31 Chevrolet for Rise Motorsports.

== Racing career ==
McGrew has previously competed in series such as the Newsome Raceway Parts Crate Racin' USA Winter Shootout Series, the American Crate All-Star Series, and the DIRTcar Sportsman Series.

In 2023, it was revealed that McGrew would make his debut in the ARCA Menards Series East at Flat Rock Speedway, driving the No. 31 Chevrolet for Rise Motorsports. After placing eleventh in the lone practice session, he qualified and finished seven laps down in tenth place.

== Motorsports career results ==
=== ARCA Menards Series East ===
ARCA Menards Series East results
Year	Team	No.	Make	1	2	3	4	5	6	7	8	AMSEC	Pts	Ref
2023	Rise Motorsports	31	Chevy	FIF	DOV	NSV	FRS; 10	IOW	IRP	MLW	BRI	38th	34	
