= Chris Martin Jr. =

American racing driver

- Born: March 27, 2002 (age 24); Huddleston, Virginia, U.S.

ARCA Menards Series career
- 2 races run over 2 years
- Best finish: 103rd (2023)
- First race: 2022 Reese's 200 (Indianapolis)
- Last race: 2023 Reese's 200 (Indianapolis)
Wins	Top tens	Poles
0	0	0

ARCA Menards Series East career
- 1 race run over 1 year
- Best finish: 49th (2023)
- First race: 2023 Reese's 200 (Indianapolis)
Wins	Top tens	Poles
0	0	0
- Statistics up to date as of September 16, 2025.

Christopher Martin Jr. (born March 27, 2002) is an American professional stock car racing driver who last competed part-time in the ARCA Menards Series and ARCA Menards Series East, driving the No. 95 Toyota for MAN Motorsports.

== Racing career ==
Martin Jr. first began racing at the age of ten, competing in go-karts before moving up to limited late models at Hickory Motor Speedway.

In 2022, Martin Jr. would run in the Paramount Kia Big 10 Challenge Series at Hickory Motor Speedway, driving the No. 12 entry, where he would finish in the top-ten in all races held that year with a best finish of second in two of those races. It was also during this year that he would make his debut in the ARCA Menards Series at Lucas Oil Indianapolis Raceway Park, driving the No. 10 Toyota for Fast Track Racing, where he would start 21st and finish 22nd due to overheating issues. For the following year, Martin Jr. would remain in the Paramount Kia Big 10 Challenge Series, where he would get his first win in the third race of the year. It was also during this year that he would return to ARCA at Indianapolis, where he would drive the No. 95 Toyota for MAN Motorsports. It would also be his debut in the ARCA Menards Series East, as it is a companion event with the main ARCA series.

== Motorsports results ==
=== ARCA Menards Series ===
(key) (Bold – Pole position awarded by qualifying time. Italics – Pole position earned by points standings or practice time. * – Most laps led.)

ARCA Menards Series results
Year	Team	No.	Make	1	2	3	4	5	6	7	8	9	10	11	12	13	14	15	16	17	18	19	20	AMSC	Pts	Ref
2022	Fast Track Racing	10	Toyota	DAY	PHO	TAL	KAN	CLT	IOW	BLN	ELK	MOH	POC	IRP; 22	MCH	GLN	ISF	MLW	DSF	KAN	BRI	SLM	TOL	110th	22	
2023	MAN Motorsports	95	Toyota	DAY	PHO	TAL	KAN	CLT	BLN	ELK	MOH	IOW	POC	MCH	IRP; 18	GLN	ISF	MLW	DSF	KAN	BRI	SLM	TOL	103rd	26	

==== ARCA Menards Series East ====
ARCA Menards Series East results
Year	Team	No.	Make	1	2	3	4	5	6	7	8	AMSEC	Pts	Ref
2023	MAN Motorsports	95	Toyota	FIF	DOV	NSV	FRS	IOW	IRP; 18	MLW	BRI	49th	26	
