= Rick Redig-Tackman =

American racing driver (born 2000)

- Born: July 2, 2000 (age 26); Waukesha, Wisconsin, U.S.

ARCA Menards Series career
- 2 races run over 2 years
- Best finish: 95th (2024)
- First race: 2023 Sprecher 150 (Milwaukee)
- Last race: 2024 Shore Lunch 250 (Elko)
Wins	Top tens	Poles
0	0	0

ARCA Menards Series East career
- 1 race run over 1 year
- Best finish: 46th (2023)
- First race: 2023 Sprecher 150 (Milwaukee)
Wins	Top tens	Poles
0	0	0

ARCA Menards Series West career
- 1 race run over 1 year
- Best finish: 55th (2024)
- First race: 2024 NAPA Auto Care 150 (Tri-City)
Wins	Top tens	Poles
0	0	0
- Statistics up to date as of October 23, 2024.

Rick Redig-Tackman (born July 2, 2000) is an American professional stock car racing driver who last competed part-time in the ARCA Menards Series, driving the No. 31 Chevrolet for Rise Motorsports.

== Racing career ==
Since 2019, Redig-Tackman has competed in the Mid-American Stock Car Series. He had made his debut in the series in 2019, driving at the Milwaukee Mile, where he would finish 24th. In 2022, he would run the full season, where he would finish in the top-ten seven times with a win at Madison International Speedway on his way to finish fourth in the final point standings. It was also during this year that he would run two Bristol Dirt Nationals Event races at Bristol Motor Speedway. Redig-Tackman would return to the Mid-American Stock Car Series in 2023, where he currently has two wins at Kankakee County Speedway and Madison.

On August 23, 2023, it was revealed that Redig-Tackman would make his ARCA Menards Series debut at the Milwaukee Mile, driving for Brad Smith Motorsports in the No. 48 Chevrolet while owner Brad Smith, who regularly drives that car, would run in the No. 69 Ford in collaboration with Kimmel Racing. It would also be his debut in the ARCA Menards Series East, as it is a companion event with the main ARCA series. Redig-Tackman had received the ride after helping Smith rebuild the car that he ran with at Charlotte Motor Speedway earlier in the year. After placing fifteenth in the sole practice section, he would qualify sixteenth and go on to finish four laps down in fourteenth.

In 2024, it was revealed that Redig-Tackman would return to the series at Elko Speedway, driving the No. 31 Chevrolet for Rise Motorsports. After placing sixteenth in the lone practice session, he qualified in twelfth and was running as high as ninth in the race, but finished eighteenth due to mechanical issues.

== Personal life ==
Redig-Tackman is the son of former ARCA competitor Rick Tackman Jr., who competed in the series from 2000 to 2017.

== Motorsports results ==
=== ARCA Menards Series ===
(key) (Bold – Pole position awarded by qualifying time. Italics – Pole position earned by points standings or practice time. * – Most laps led.)

ARCA Menards Series results
Year	Team	No.	Make	1	2	3	4	5	6	7	8	9	10	11	12	13	14	15	16	17	18	19	20	AMSC	Pts	Ref
2023	Brad Smith Motorsports	48	Chevy	DAY	PHO	TAL	KAN	CLT	BLN	ELK	MOH	IOW	POC	MCH	IRP	GLN	ISF	MLW; 14	DSF	KAN	BRI	SLM	TOL	96th	30	
2024	Rise Motorsports	31	Chevy	DAY	PHO	TAL	DOV	KAN	CLT	IOW	MOH	BLN	IRP	SLM	ELK; 18	MCH	ISF	MLW	DSF	GLN	BRI	KAN	TOL	95th	26	

==== ARCA Menards Series East ====
ARCA Menards Series East results
Year	Team	No.	Make	1	2	3	4	5	6	7	8	AMSEC	Pts	Ref
2023	Brad Smith Motorsports	48	Chevy	FIF	DOV	NSV	FRS	IOW	IRP	MLW; 14	BRI	46th	30	

==== ARCA Menards Series West ====
ARCA Menards Series West results
Year	Team	No.	Make	1	2	3	4	5	6	7	8	9	10	11	12	AMSWC	Pts	Ref
2024	Rise Motorsports	31	Chevy	PHO	KER	PIR	SON	IRW	IRW	SHA	TRI; 12	MAD	AAS	KER	PHO	55th	32	
