= Shane Huffman =

American racing driver

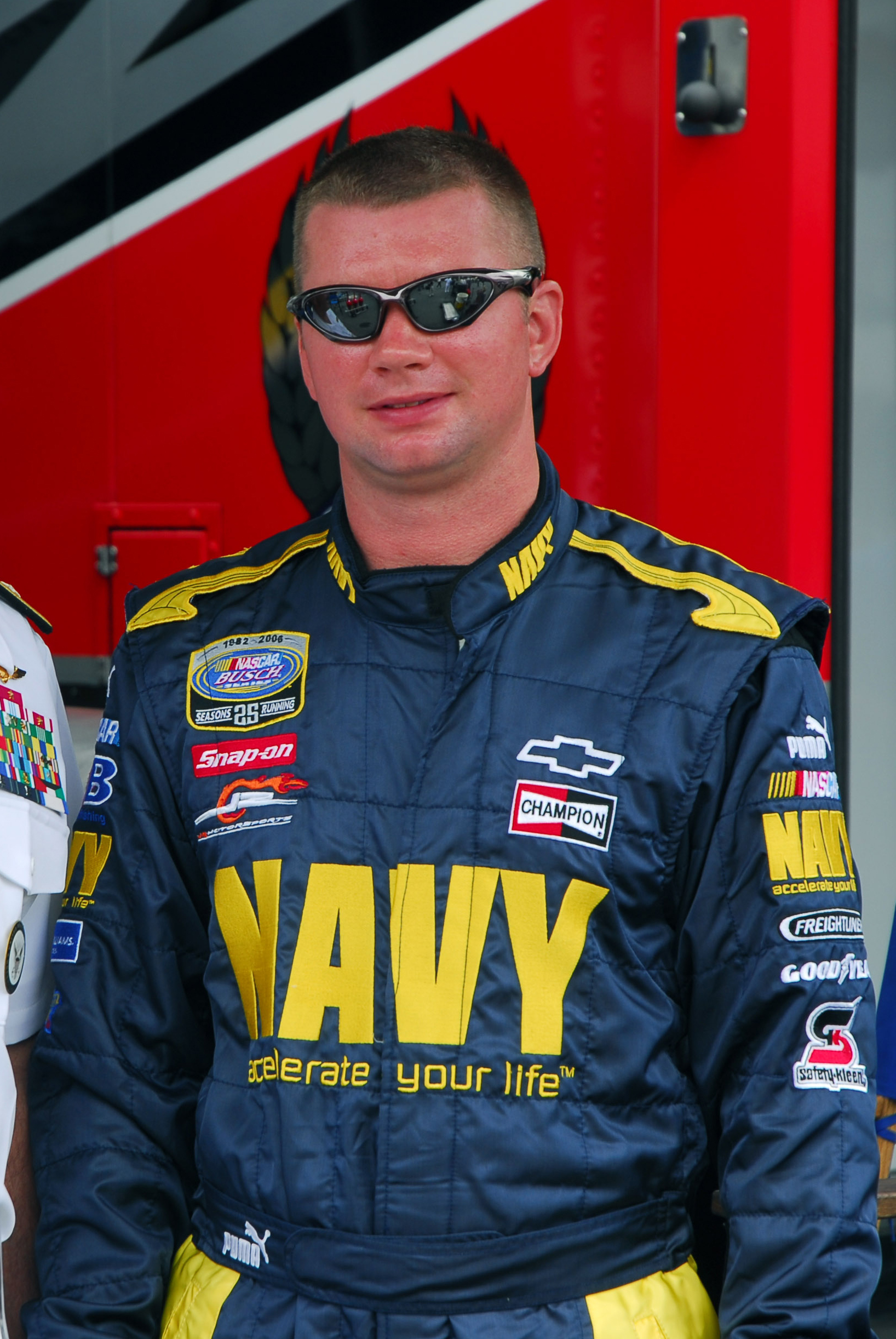
- Huffman at Dover International Speedway in 2006
- Born: Shane S. Huffman; December 30, 1973 (age 52); Hickory, North Carolina, U.S.
- Achievements: 2020 ARCA Menards Series championship-winning crew chief 2003 USAR Hooters Pro Cup Series Champion; 2005 USAR Hooters Pro Cup Series Southern Division Champion; 1999 NASCAR Winston Racing Series Blue Ridge Region Champion; 1999 Hickory Motor Speedway Track Champion Late Model Stock Class; 1996 Hickory Motor Speedway Limited Late Model Series Champion

NASCAR O'Reilly Auto Parts Series career
- 31 races run over 4 years
- Best finish: 34th (2007)
- First race: 2001 Autolite/Fram 250 (Richmond)
- Last race: 2008 Missouri-Illinois Dodge Dealers 250 (Gateway)
Wins	Top tens	Poles
0	6	0

NASCAR FedEx Freight Truck Series career
- 7 races run over 2 years
- First race: 2006 Kroger 200 (Martinsville)
- Last race: 2007 Toyota Tundra Milwaukee 200 (Milwaukee)
Wins	Top tens	Poles
0	0	0
- Statistics up to date as of April 2, 2013.

Shane S. Huffman (born December 30, 1973) is an American professional former stock car racing driver and current crew chief and team manager for Pinnacle Racing Group, which fields the No. 28 Chevrolet SS full-time in the ARCA Menards Series, and part-time in the ARCA Menards Series East and ARCA Menards Series West.

As a crew chief, Huffman won the 2020 ARCA Menards Series championship crew chiefing Bret Holmes' No. 23 car for Holmes' family-owned team. As a driver, he competed in that series in 2000 when it was known as the ARCA Bondo/Mar-Hyde Series as well as in what is now the NASCAR Xfinity Series in 2001 and from 2006 to 2008 and in the NASCAR Truck Series in 2006 and 2007.

Huffman is notable for being one of the first drivers for Dale Earnhardt Jr.'s JR Motorsports team during the team's early years. He drove their No. 88 United States Navy-sponsored car in what was then the Busch Series for parts of 2006 and 2007. When he was released by JRM halfway through 2007, his replacement was Brad Keselowski, who would go to on to win dozens of races in the series and the championship in 2010 as well as win the 2012 NASCAR Cup Series championship and dozens of Cup Series races.

== Racing career ==
=== Driving career ===
Huffman began his racing career at Hickory Motor Speedway in late model stock car racing. In 1996, he won the Limited Late Model Series championship. In 1999 he won the late model track championship, the Blue Ridge Regional Championship, and was the runner-up for the NASCAR Winston Racing Series Champion.

In 2000, Huffman moved up to the USAR Hooters Pro Cup. After posting no top-ten finishes in his rookie year on the circuit, he won his first career race at Coastal Plains Speedway in 2001. That same season, he made his NASCAR Busch Series debut at Richmond, driving the No. 77 Jennie-O Ford Taurus for Moy Racing. He started 40th and finished 24th, three laps down.

After a winless 2002, Huffman won five races and was both the champion of USAR's national points standings, as well as the Southern Division. He repeated his Southern Division title in 2005. Huffman has 28 wins in 133 starts in USAR – the 2nd most wins in the USAR series history. Huffman holds the record with most poles in USAR history at 26.

Huffman had three wins in USAR in 2006 driving the No. 88 Champion Chevy for JR Motorsports. He made his first Busch start that year driving the No. 83 Make-A-Wish Foundation Chevy for at Gateway International Raceway in a JR Motorsports car prepared by NEMCO Motorsports. Following the release of regular 88 driver Mark McFarland, Huffman shared the driving duties of the 88 for the rest of the season with Robby Gordon and Martin Truex Jr.

Huffman started the 2007 Busch season in the No. 88 car. On July 3, 2007, Dale Earnhardt Jr. released him from driving the No. 88 Navy Chevy for JR Motorsports. He went on to compete part-time in the Truck Series with Curtis Key Motorsports in 2007.

Huffman returned to Nationwide racing on July 4, 2008, driving the No. 31 car for Stanton Barrett Motorsports in the Winn-Dixie 250 at Daytona International Speedway. He started 21st and was able to lead 2 laps (17 and 18) when he remained on the track after a lap 14 caution caused by the spinning No. 22 car driven by Josh Wise. When the green flag dropped on lap 17 Huffman was able to hold off a charge by his ex-boss, Dale Earnhardt Jr. After 2 laps he was passed by Earnhardt and remained in the top 10 for one more lap before falling back in the pack. Huffman eventually finished in 41st position, 82 laps down.

=== Crew chiefing career ===
==== 2007–2016 ====
After he was released from his ride with JR Motorsports midway through the 2007 season, Huffman joined Rusty Wallace Racing as a car chief for Steve Wallace before moving to the Truck Series.

In 2014, Huffman was the crew chief for Brandon Jones at Turner Scott Motorsports in his full-time ride in the K&N Pro Series East (No. 33 car) as well as his part-time rides in the Truck (No. 33) and ARCA Series (No. 4 car). At the very end of the year, he and Jones joined GMS Racing when Jones' No. 33 team was sold by TSM due to the team's financial problems. He continued to work as crew chief of the No. 33 truck when it became full-time in 2015 with Jones and the Dillon brothers until his suspension from the final two Truck races, where he subsequently left the team entirely.

The following year, Huffman returned from his suspension and joined Red Horse Racing where he crew chiefed Timothy Peters' No. 17 truck.

==== 2017–2018: MDM Motorsports ====
In 2017, Huffman moved to MDM Motorsports and their No. 99 truck, where he reunited with Jones and the Dillons (all three of whom were driving the truck part-time) and later Peters too (after Red Horse closed down during the season). The other drivers in the truck that he got to crew chief that year were Tommy Joe Martins, Travis Miller, Bubba Wallace, Brian Wong, Cale Gale, and Dalton Sargeant.

On August 12, Huffman got his first win as a crew chief in the LTi Printing 200 at Michigan with Wallace driving. In 2018, MDM decided to downsize their Truck operation and expand their ARCA team, and Huffman became the crew chief for the part-time No. 12 car driven by Harrison Burton and Brandon Jones. At the start of the season, he remained the crew chief of the No. 99 truck whenever it was entered, the first race being at the spring Martinsville race with Tyler Matthews. However, in the other three races the truck ran that year (Eldora with Sheldon Creed and the fall Martinsville race and Phoenix with Chase Purdy), Jeff Stankiewicz was the crew chief of the No. 99 instead.

==== 2019–2022: Bret Holmes Racing ====
After MDM shut down in 2019, Huffman moved to Bret Holmes Racing to crew chief driver-owner Bret Holmes' No. 23 car. Although they did not win a race that year, they finished third in the standings, a career-best for Holmes. Huffman returned to crew chief Holmes in 2020 and they won the championship together that year. He continued to crew chief for BHR in 2021 which added a part-time Truck Series team that year. Holmes, Sam Mayer and Ty Dillon drove the No. 32 truck with Huffman as crew chief. The team's No. 23 ARCA car which he crew chiefed only ran part-time with Holmes and Mayer that year. In 2022, Huffman again crew chiefed BHR's No. 23 car and No. 32 truck which were both part-time again and driven by Holmes and Connor Mosack. Huffman and Holmes came close to winning both the ARCA and Truck Series races at Talladega (Holmes' home track) that year but finished second and third, respectively.

==== 2023–present: Pinnacle Racing Group ====
In 2023, Huffman would leave BHR and start his own ARCA team, Pinnacle Racing Group, with NASCAR spotter Lorin Ranier and former NASCAR driver Josh Wise. The team would field a full-time car for Luke Fenhaus the No. 28 Chevrolet, in the ARCA Menards Series East with Huffman as the crew chief. In addition, Huffman would serve as the team's general manager.

== Personal life ==
Huffman has a son, Landon S. Huffman, who runs in Late Model Stock Cars for Pinnacle Racing Group, the team Shane manages.

Huffman was a three-year starter for St. Stephens High School's wrestling team (1989–1990, 1990–1991, 1991–1992). He was instrumental in helping with the success of the team; posting a career record of 59–27 at the 112 lb and 119 lb weight classes, as the team won the Big-6 3A conference championship 2 out of the 3 years he started. He also served as one of the team captains during his senior year. To this day, Huffman still ranks high on the individual records lists for the school in Single Season Near Fall Points (141), Single Season Pins (21), Single Season Team Points (181.5), Career Near Fall Points (245), Career Pins (34), Career Team Points (342), and Career Wins (59).

== Motorsports career results ==
=== NASCAR ===
(key) (Bold – Pole position awarded by qualifying time. Italics – Pole position earned by points standings or practice time. * – Most laps led.)

==== Nationwide Series ====
NASCAR Nationwide Series results
Year	Team	No.	Make	1	2	3	4	5	6	7	8	9	10	11	12	13	14	15	16	17	18	19	20	21	22	23	24	25	26	27	28	29	30	31	32	33	34	35	NNSC	Pts	Ref
2001	PRW Racing	77	Ford	DAY	CAR	LVS	ATL	DAR	BRI	TEX	NSH	TAL	CAL	RCH	NHA	NZH	CLT	DOV	KEN	MLW	GLN	CHI	GTY	PPR	IRP	MCH	BRI	DAR	RCH; 24	DOV	KAN	CLT	MEM	PHO	CAR	HOM			108th	91	
2006	JR Motorsports	83	Chevy	DAY	CAL	MXC	LVS	ATL	BRI	TEX	NSH	PHO	TAL	RCH	DAR	CLT	DOV	NSH	KEN	MLW	DAY	CHI	NHA	MAR	GTY; 27	IRP	GLN	MCH											49th	841	
2006	JR Motorsports	88	Chevy																										BRI; 31	CAL	RCH; 22	DOV; 36	KAN; 21	CLT; 39	MEM; 5	TEX; 42	PHO; 8	HOM; 37	49th	841	
2007	JR Motorsports	88	Chevy	DAY; 36	CAL; 21	MXC; 21	LVS; 9	ATL; 19	BRI; 38	NSH; 6	TEX; 39	PHO; 42	TAL; 15	RCH; 18	DAR; 27	CLT; 24	DOV; 37	NSH; 19	KEN; 5	MLW; 10	NHA; 23	DAY	CHI	GTY	IRP	CGV	GLN	MCH	BRI	CAL	RCH	DOV	KAN	CLT	MEM	TEX	PHO	HOM	34th	1727	
2008	SKI Motorsports	31	Chevy	DAY	CAL	LVS	ATL	BRI	NSH	TEX	PHO	MXC	TAL	RCH	DAR	CLT	DOV	NSH	KEN	MLW	NHA	DAY; 41	CHI																106th	151	
2008	MacDonald Motorsports	81	Dodge																					GTY; 19	IRP	CGV	GLN	MCH	BRI	CAL	RCH	DOV	KAN	CLT	MEM	TEX	PHO	HOM	106th	151	

==== Craftsman Truck Series ====
NASCAR Craftsman Truck Series results
Year	Team	No.	Make	1	2	3	4	5	6	7	8	9	10	11	12	13	14	15	16	17	18	19	20	21	22	23	24	25	NCTC	Pts	Ref
2006	Key Motorsports	40	Chevy	DAY	CAL	ATL	MAR	GTY	CLT	MFD	DOV	TEX	MCH	MLW	KAN	KEN	MEM	IRP	NSH	BRI	NHA	LVS	TAL	MAR; 35	ATL	TEX; 26	PHO; 28	HOM; 20	48th	325	
2007	Key Motorsports	40	Chevy	DAY	CAL	ATL	MAR	KAN	CLT; 24	MFD	DOV; 24	TEX	MCH	MLW; 22	MEM	KEN	IRP	NSH	BRI	GTW	NHA	LVS	TAL	MAR	ATL	TEX	PHO	HOM	59th	279	

==== Goody's Dash Series ====
NASCAR Goody's Dash Series results
Year	Team	No.	Make	1	2	3	4	5	6	7	8	9	10	11	12	13	14	15	16	17	18	19	20	NGDS	Pts	Ref
1998	N/A	39	Pontiac	DAY	HCY	CAR	CLT	TRI	LAN	BRI	SUM	GRE	ROU	SNM	MYB	CON	HCY; 5	LAN	STA	LOU	VOL	USA	HOM	71st	155	

=== ARCA Bondo/Mar-Hyde Series ===
(key) (Bold – Pole position awarded by qualifying time. Italics – Pole position earned by points standings or practice time. * – Most laps led.)

ARCA Bondo/Mar-Hyde Series results
Year	Team	No.	Make	1	2	3	4	5	6	7	8	9	10	11	12	13	14	15	16	17	18	19	20	ABSC	Pts	Ref
2000	PRW Racing	74	Ford	DAY; 20	SLM	AND	CLT	KIL	FRS	MCH	POC	TOL	KEN	BLN	POC	WIN	ISF	KEN	DSF	SLM	CLT	TAL	ATL	109th	130	
