= A. J. Moyer =

American racing driver (born 1987)

- Born: Allen Moyer; October 6, 1987 (age 39); Tampa, Florida, U.S.

ARCA Menards Series career
- 28 races run over 6 years
- Best finish: 7th (2023)
- First race: 2021 Herr's Potato Chips 200 (Toledo)
- Last race: 2026 Alabama Manufactured Housing 200 (Talladega)
Wins	Top tens	Poles
0	2	0

ARCA Menards Series East career
- 6 races run over 3 years
- Best finish: 17th (2023)
- First race: 2022 Bush's Beans 200 (Bristol)
- Last race: 2025 Rockingham ARCA 125 (Rockingham)
Wins	Top tens	Poles
0	0	0

ARCA Menards Series West career
- 1 race run over 1 year
- Best finish: 63rd (2023)
- First race: 2023 General Tire 150 (Phoenix)
Wins	Top tens	Poles
0	0	0
- Statistics up to date as of April 25, 2026.

Allen "A. J." Moyer (born October 6, 1987) is an American professional stock car racing driver. He last competed part-time in the ARCA Menards Series, driving the No. 88 Chevrolet SS for his own team, Moyer-Petroniro Racing.

== Racing career ==
=== ARCA Menards Series ===
On April 11, 2021, Moyer would announce on Twitter that he would be making his debut with Wayne Peterson Racing at the 2021 Herr's Potato Chips 200. He would finish ninth, garnering his first top-ten. He would make one more start at the 2021 Sioux Chief PowerPEX 200, finishing fifteenth.

In 2022, it was announced that Moyer would run three races with Peterson, with those races being at Talladega Superspeedway, Salem Speedway, and the season finale at Toledo Speedway. Although he would not compete at Salem, he would compete at Talladega, where he would finish 23rd, Bristol Motor Speedway, where he would finish 23rd due to a crash, and Toledo, where he would finish sixteenth.

Moyer ran nearly the full season in the main ARCA Series in 2023 driving for Wayne Peterson Racing, mostly in their No. 06 car. He ran every race until the race at Kansas in September, which he missed along with the races at Salem and Toledo at the end of the season. He finished seventh in the final points standings.

On January 9, 2024, Moyer announced that he would be starting his own ARCA team in 2024, Moyer-Petroniro Racing, with co-owner Randy Petroniro, who was a previous sponsor of his. The team will field the No. 88 car part-time with Moyer running all six races of the General Tire Superspeedway Challenge (Daytona, Talladega, both Kansas races, Charlotte and Michigan) and Randy Jr, the son of the co-owner, making his ARCA debut running some short track races. He would only end up running Daytona (which he failed to qualify), Talladega, and Charlotte.

In 2025, Moyer returned to Moyer-Petroniro Racing at Daytona and finished in seventh, his second top-ten.

== Personal life ==
Moyer is the son of the 1981 ARCA Racing Series champion Larry Moyer. He is not related to Stephanie Moyer, who like A. J. also made her ARCA debut in 2021 and has competed in the series since then. A. J. is from Florida and Stephanie is from Pennsylvania.

== Motorsports career results ==
=== Stock car career summary ===
Season	Series	Team	Races	Wins	Top 5	Top 10	Points	Position
2021	ARCA Menards Series	Wayne Peterson Racing	2	0	0	1	64	58th
2022	ARCA Menards Series East	Wayne Peterson Racing	1	0	0	0	21	55th
2022	ARCA Menards Series	Wayne Peterson Racing	3	0	0	0	70	50th
2023	ARCA Menards Series West	Wayne Peterson Racing	1	0	0	0	23	63rd
2023	ARCA Menards Series East	Wayne Peterson Racing	4	0	0	0	152	17th
2023	ARCA Menards Series	Wayne Peterson Racing	16	0	0	0	570	7th
2023	ARCA Menards Series	Clubb Racing Inc.	1	0	0	0	570	7th
2024	ARCA Menards Series	Moyer-Petroniro Racing	2	0	0	0	53	69th
2025	ARCA Menards Series East	Clubb Racing Inc.	1	0	0	0	23	65th
2025	ARCA Menards Series	Moyer-Petroniro Racing	2	0	0	1	53	76th
2026	ARCA Menards Series	Moyer-Petroniro Racing	2	0	0	0	35	92nd

=== ARCA Menards Series ===
(key) (Bold – Pole position awarded by qualifying time. Italics – Pole position earned by points standings or practice time. * – Most laps led.)

ARCA Menards Series results
Year	Team	No.	Make	1	2	3	4	5	6	7	8	9	10	11	12	13	14	15	16	17	18	19	20	AMSC	Pts	Ref
2021	Wayne Peterson Racing	40	Ford	DAY	PHO	TAL	KAN	TOL; 9	CLT	MOH	POC	ELK	BLN	IOW	WIN	GLN	MCH	ISF	MLW	DSF	BRI			58th	64	
2021	Wayne Peterson Racing	06	Ford																			SLM; 15	KAN	58th	64	
2022	Wayne Peterson Racing	0	Ford	DAY	PHO	TAL; 23	KAN	CLT	IOW	BLN	ELK	MOH	POC	IRP	MCH	GLN	ISF	MLW	DSF	KAN				50th	70	
2022	Wayne Peterson Racing	06	Ford																		BRI; 23	SLM	TOL; 16	50th	70	
2023	Wayne Peterson Racing	06	Chevy	DAY; 29		TAL; 20	KAN; 20																	7th	570	
2023	Wayne Peterson Racing	06	Toyota		PHO; 21				BLN; 14	ELK; 15		IOW; 14	POC; 16		IRP; 17		ISF; 15	MLW; 16	DSF; 18	KAN				7th	570	
2023	Wayne Peterson Racing	06	Ford					CLT; 27						MCH; 20							BRI; 27	SLM	TOL	7th	570	
2023	Wayne Peterson Racing	0	Toyota								MOH; 17													7th	570	
2023	Clubb Racing Inc.	03	Ford													GLN; 21								7th	570	
2024	Moyer-Petroniro Racing	88	Chevy	DAY; DNQ	PHO	TAL; 19	DOV	KAN	CLT; 19	IOW	MOH	BLN	IRP	SLM	ELK	MCH	ISF	MLW	DSF	GLN	BRI	KAN	TOL	69th	53	
2025	Moyer-Petroniro Racing	88	Chevy	DAY; 7	PHO	TAL; 28	KAN	CLT	MCH	BLN	ELK	LRP	DOV	IRP	IOW	GLN	ISF	MAD	DSF	BRI	SLM	KAN	TOL	76th	53	
2026	Moyer-Petroniro Racing	88	Chevy	DAY; 14	PHO	KAN	TAL; 39	GLN	TOL	MCH	POC	BER	ELK	CHI	LRP	IRP	IOW	ISF	MAD	DSF	SLM	BRI	KAN	92nd	35	

==== ARCA Menards Series East ====
ARCA Menards Series East results
Year	Team	No.	Make	1	2	3	4	5	6	7	8	AMSWC	Pts	Ref
2022	Wayne Peterson Racing	06	Ford	NSM	FIF	DOV	NSV	IOW	MLW	BRI; 23		55th	21	
2023	Wayne Peterson Racing	06	Toyota	FIF	DOV	NSV	FRS	IOW; 14	IRP; 17	MLW; 16		17th	152	
2023	Wayne Peterson Racing	06	Ford								BRI; 27	17th	152	
2025	Clubb Racing Inc.	86	Ford	FIF	CAR; 21	NSV	FRS	DOV	IRP	IOW	BRI	65th	23	

==== ARCA Menards Series West ====
ARCA Menards Series West results
Year	Team	No.	Make	1	2	3	4	5	6	7	8	9	10	11	12	AMSWC	Pts	Ref
2023	Wayne Peterson Racing	06	Toyota	PHO; 21	IRW	KCR	PIR	SON	IRW	SHA	EVG	AAS	LVS	MAD	PHO	63rd	23	
