= Dale Shearer (racing driver) =

American racing driver

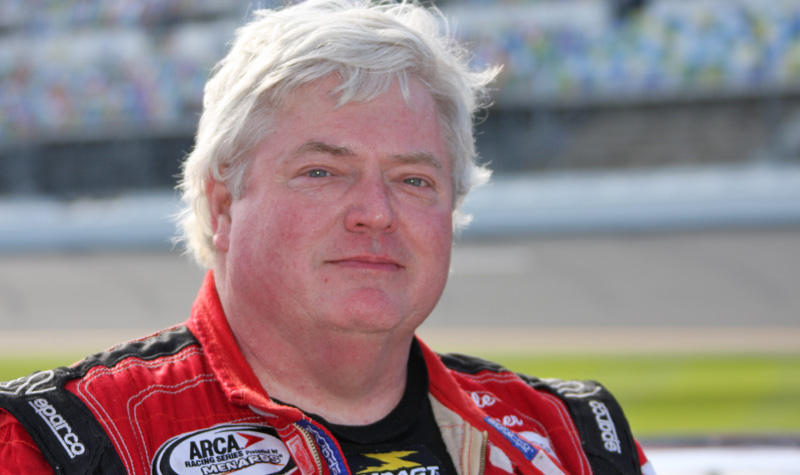
- Shearer at Daytona International Speedway in 2016
- Born: August 26, 1959 (age 67); Chillicothe, Missouri, U.S.

ARCA Menards Series career
- 55 races run over 15 years
- Best finish: 31st (2026)
- First race: 2008 Allen Crowe 100 (Springfield)
- Last race: 2026 Audubon Park 100 (DuQuoin)
Wins	Top tens	Poles
0	0	0

ARCA Menards Series East career
- 13 races run over 3 years
- Best finish: 6th (2023)
- First race: 2023 Pensacola 200 (Pensacola)
- Last race: 2026 LiUNA! 150 (IRP)
Wins	Top tens	Poles
0	1	0
- Statistics up to date as of September 26, 2026.

Dale J. Shearer (born August 26, 1959) is an American professional stock car racing driver. He last competed part-time in the ARCA Menards Series, driving the No. 98 Toyota Camry for Shearer Speed Racing.

== Racing career ==
Shearer first gained an interest in racing after his father worked as a pit steward for Kline's Speedway, but would not compete in a race until the age of 21, when he would compete at various dirt-tracks driving street cars that were converted into racing cars.

Shearer made his ARCA Re/Max Series debut in 2008, driving his self-owned No. 73 Ford at the Illinois State Fairgrounds, where he would finish 28th due to handling issues. He would make two more starts at the DuQuoin State Fairgrounds and Salem Speedway. He would make two more starts the following year with a best finish of 27th at Berlin Raceway. After not competing in the series the following year, Shearer would return in 2011, making starts at Springfield and DuQuoin. He would enter in five more races in 2012, and would earn a best finish of seventeenth at Winchester Speedway.

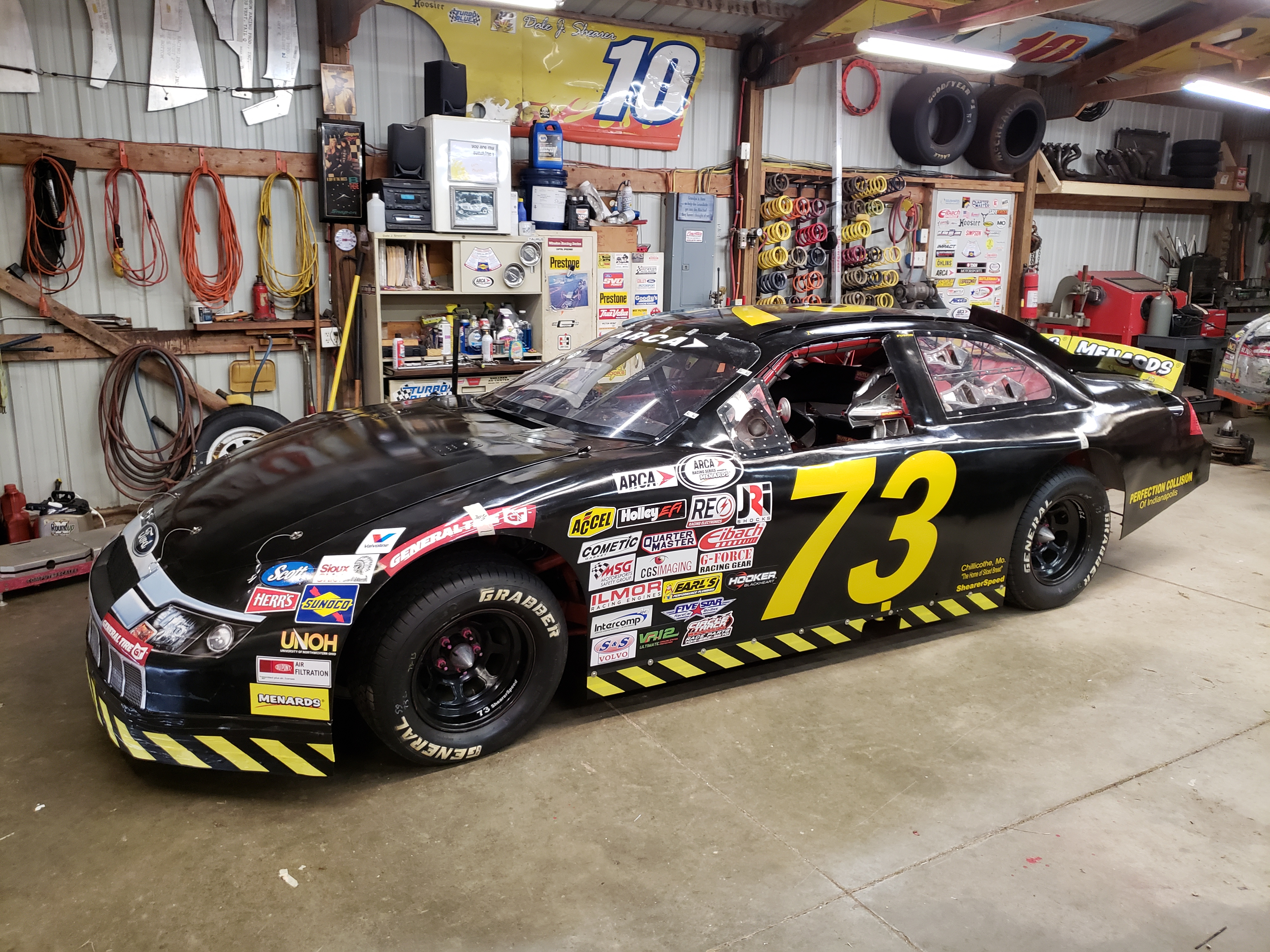
Shearer's ARCA car in 2018

In 2014, Shearer would run five races during the season, and in the last race of the year at Kansas Speedway, he was involved in a multi-car crash involving Galen Hassler and Tom Berte, finishing 26th. He would run a majority of his races from 2015 to 2018 with his own team.

In 2019, Shearer would run the No. 69 Ford in collaboration with Kimmel Racing at Madison International Speedway, where he would finish eighteenth and last due to clutch issues. He would run in two more races at Elko Speedway and Springfield.

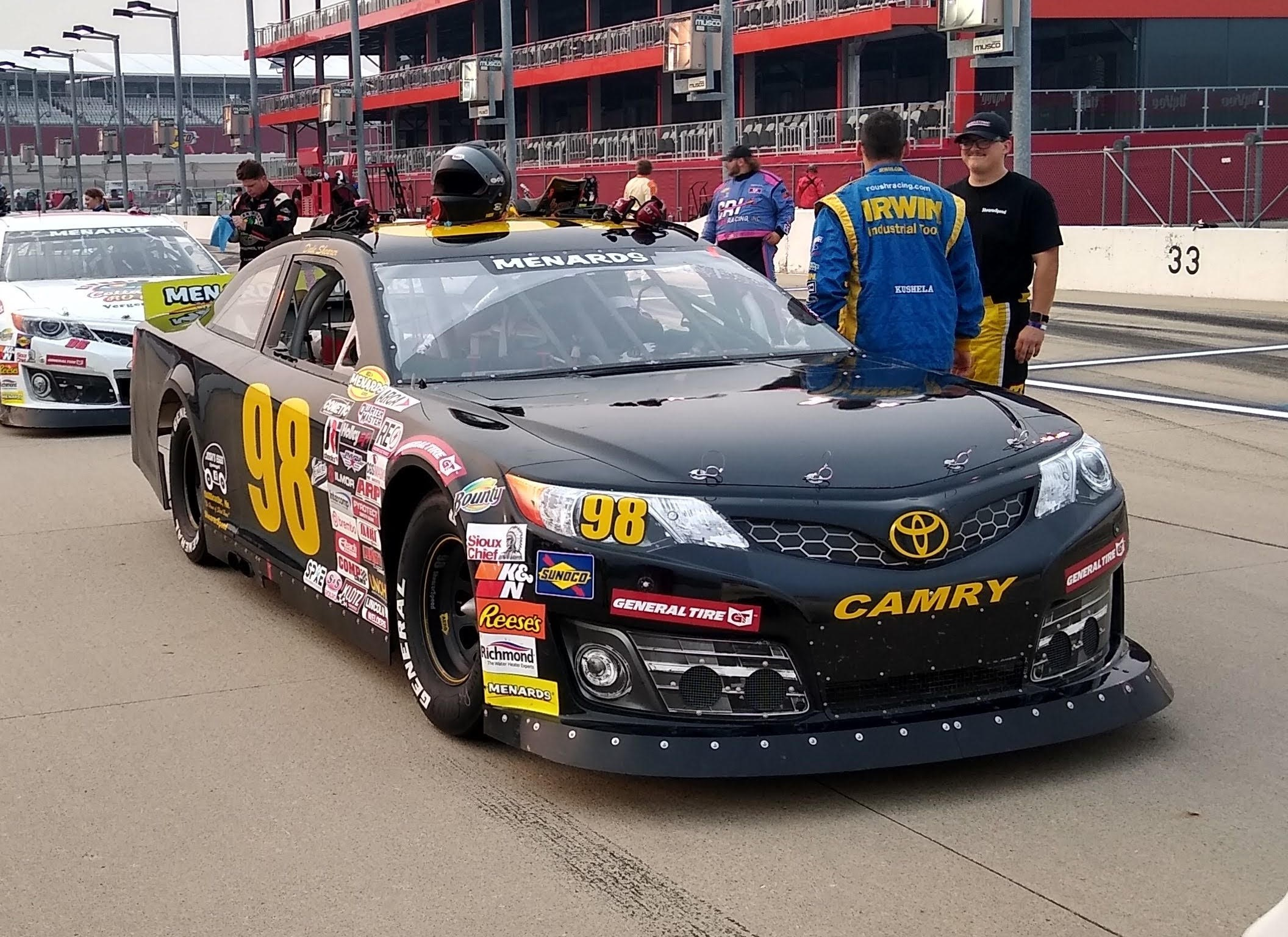
Shearer's No. 98 car at Iowa Speedway in 2023

After not running in ARCA competition from 2020 to 2022, Shearer announced that he would return to the series with his own team, now Shearer Speed Racing, in the No. 98 Toyota for select events in 2023. He later announced that he would run the full ARCA Menards Series East season that year as well. Although he would not enter the race at Talladega, he would run the full East Series schedule. Josh’s Eggs, a longtime racing sponsor, would adorn the side of the car for the full 2023 ARCA East Series schedule. After finishing fourteenth at the first two races at Five Flags Speedway and Dover Motor Speedway, he would go on to finish tenth at Nashville Fairgrounds Speedway, his first top-ten finish of his career, and would later finish eleventh at the next race at Flat Rock Speedway. At Iowa Speedway, he would finish eighteenth due to a transmission issue after thirty laps, and at Lucas Oil Indianapolis Raceway Park, he would finish nineteenth due to handling issues. At the Milwaukee Mile, he would start 22nd and once again finish nineteenth after suffering mechanical issues that stalled his car down the backstretch which necessitated a caution. At Bristol Motor Speedway, he would start 25th, but would retire the car a quarter of the way through the race due to mechanical issues and be classified in 24th. He would go on to finish sixth in the final points standings for the East Series.

In 2024, Shearer announced that he would once again run the full schedule in the East Series, as well as attempting the races at Daytona International Speedway and Talladega Superspeedway.

== Personal life ==
Shearer currently resides in Alhambra, Illinois, where he is employed as a computer programmer with the Madison County, Illinois, government.

Shearer and his wife, Dianna, have two children and four grandchildren.

== Motorsports career results ==
=== Stock car career summary ===
Season	Series	Team	Races	Wins	Top 5	Top 10	Points	Position
2008	ARCA Re/Max Series	Shearer Racing	3	0	0	0	265	79th
2009	ARCA Re/Max Series	Shearer Racing	2	0	0	0	165	121st
2011	ARCA Racing Series	Shearer Racing	2	0	0	0	245	80th
2012	ARCA Racing Series	Shearer Racing	5	0	0	0	465	46th
2013	ARCA Racing Series	Shearer Racing	0	0	0	0	0	N/A
2014	ARCA Racing Series	Shearer Racing	5	0	0	0	650	36th
2015	ARCA Racing Series	Shearer Racing	4	0	0	0	655	37th
2015	ARCA Racing Series	Wayne Peterson Racing	1	0	0	0	655	37th
2016	ARCA Racing Series	Shearer Racing	4	0	0	0	680	39th
2016	ARCA Racing Series	Wayne Peterson Racing	2	0	0	0	680	39th
2017	ARCA Racing Series	Shearer Racing	3	0	0	0	335	58th
2018	ARCA Racing Series	Shearer Racing	1	0	0	0	130	99th
2019	ARCA Menards Series	Shearer Racing	3	0	0	0	445	38th
2023	ARCA Menards Series East	Shearer Speed Racing	8	0	0	1	323	6th
2023	ARCA Menards Series	Shearer Speed Racing	4	0	0	0	96	40th
2024	ARCA Menards Series East	Shearer Speed Racing	3	0	0	0	54	34th
2024	ARCA Menards Series	Shearer Speed Racing	7	0	0	0	146	32nd
2025	ARCA Menards Series	Shearer Speed Racing	3	0	0	0	61	73rd
2026	ARCA Menards Series East	Shearer Speed Racing	2	0	0	0	39	49th
2026	ARCA Menards Series	Shearer Speed Racing	6	0	0	0	145	31st

=== ARCA Menards Series ===
(key) (Bold – Pole position awarded by qualifying time. Italics – Pole position earned by points standings or practice time. * – Most laps led. ** – All laps led.)

ARCA Menards Series results
Year	Team	No.	Make	1	2	3	4	5	6	7	8	9	10	11	12	13	14	15	16	17	18	19	20	21	AMSC	Pts	Ref
2008	Dale Shearer Racing	73	Ford	DAY	SLM	IOW	KAN	CAR	KEN	TOL	POC	MCH	CAY	KEN	BLN	POC	NSH	ISF; 28	DSF; 29	CHI					79th	265	
2008	Dale Shearer Racing	29	Ford																		SLM; 28	NJE	TAL	TOL	79th	265	
2009	Dale Shearer Racing	73	Ford	DAY	SLM	CAR	TAL	KEN	TOL	POC	MCH	MFD	IOW	KEN	BLN; 27	POC	ISF; 32	CHI	TOL	DSF	NJE	SLM	KAN	CAR	121st	165	
2011	Shearer Racing	73	Ford	DAY	TAL	SLM	TOL	NJE	CHI	POC	MCH; Wth	WIN	BLN	IOW	IRP; Wth	POC	ISF; 23	MAD	DSF; 25	SLM; Wth	KAN	TOL			80th	245	
2012	Shearer Racing	73	Ford	DAY	MOB	SLM	TAL	TOL	ELK	POC	MCH	WIN; 17	NJE	IOW; 40	CHI	IRP	POC	BLN	ISF; 20	MAD	SLM; 18	DSF	KAN; 40		46th	465	
2013	Shearer Racing	73	Ford	DAY	MOB	SLM	TAL	TOL	ELK	POC	MCH	ROA	WIN	CHI	NJE	POC	BLN	ISF; Wth	MAD	DSF; Wth	IOW	SLM	KEN	KAN	N/A	0	
2014	Shearer Racing	73	Ford	DAY	MOB	SLM; 20	TAL	TOL	NJE	POC	MCH	ELK	WIN	CHI	IRP	POC	BLN	ISF; 18	MAD	DSF; 17	SLM; 19	KEN	KAN; 26		36th	650	
2015	Shearer Racing	73	Ford	DAY; DNQ	MOB	NSH	SLM	TAL	TOL	NJE	POC	MCH	CHI	WIN	IOW	IRP; 21	POC	BLN	ISF; 19	DSF; 19	SLM; 22	KEN			37th	655	
2015	Wayne Peterson Racing	0	Ford																				KAN; 23		37th	655	
2016	Shearer Racing	68	Ford	DAY; 25	NSH	SLM	TAL	TOL	NJE	POC	MCH	MAD	WIN	IOW	IRP	POC	BLN								39th	680	
2016	Shearer Racing	73	Ford															ISF; 11	DSF; 18				KAN; 30		39th	680	
2016	Wayne Peterson Racing	0	Chevy																	SLM; 23					39th	680	
2016	Wayne Peterson Racing	00	Chevy																		CHI; 33	KEN			39th	680	
2017	Shearer Racing	94	Ford	DAY	NSH; 30	SLM	TAL	TOL	ELK	POC	MCH	MAD	IOW	IRP; 18	POC	WIN	ISF; 23	ROA	DSF	SLM	CHI	KEN; Wth	KAN		58th	335	
2018	Shearer Racing	73	Ford	DAY	NSH	SLM; 20	TAL	TOL	CLT	POC	MCH	MAD	GTW	CHI	IOW	ELK	POC	ISF; Wth	BLN	DSF	SLM	IRP	KAN		99th	130	
2019	Shearer Racing	69	Ford	DAY	FIF	SLM	TAL	NSH	TOL	CLT	POC	MCH	MAD; 18	GTW	CHI	ELK; 14	IOW	POC							38th	455	
2019	Shearer Racing	68	Ford																ISF; 17	DSF	SLM	IRP	KAN		38th	455	
2023	Shearer Speed Racing	98	Toyota	DAY	PHO	TAL	KAN	CLT	BLN	ELK	MOH	IOW; 18	POC	MCH	IRP; 19	GLN	ISF	MLW; 19	DSF	KAN	BRI; 24	SLM	TOL		40th	96	
2024	Shearer Speed Racing	98	Toyota	DAY; DNQ	PHO	TAL; 29	DOV; Wth	KAN	CLT	IOW; 19	MOH	BLN; 20	IRP; 30	SLM; 20	ELK	MCH	ISF	MLW	DSF	GLN	BRI; 29	KAN	TOL; 18		32nd	146	
2025	Shearer Speed Racing	98	Toyota	DAY	PHO	TAL; 29	KAN	CLT	MCH	BLN; 20	ELK; 22	LRP	DOV	IRP	IOW	GLN	ISF	MAD	DSF	BRI	SLM	KAN	TOL		73rd	61	
2026	Shearer Speed Racing	98	Toyota	DAY; DNQ	PHO	KAN	TAL	GLN	TOL; 23	MCH	POC	BER; 17	ELK; 18	CHI	LRP	IRP; 26	IOW	ISF; 16	MAD	DSF; 22	SLM; Wth	BRI	KAN		31st	145	

==== ARCA Menards Series East ====
ARCA Menards Series East results
Year	Team	No.	Make	1	2	3	4	5	6	7	8	AMSEC	Pts	Ref
2023	Shearer Speed Racing	98	Toyota	FIF; 14	DOV; 14	NSV; 10	FRS; 11	IOW; 18	IRP; 19	MLW; 19	BRI; 24	6th	323	
2024	Shearer Speed Racing	98	Toyota	FIF; Wth	DOV; Wth	NSV	FRS	IOW; 19	IRP; 30	MLW	BRI; 29	34th	54	
2026	Shearer Speed Racing	98	Toyota	HCY	CAR	NSV	TOL; 23	IRP; 26	FRS	IOW	BRI	49th	39	
