= Regina Sirvent =

Mexican racing driver (born 2003)

- Born: February 13, 2003 (age 23); Mexico City, Mexico

ARCA Menards Series career
- 3 races run over 1 year
- Best finish: 50th (2025)
- First race: 2025 Henry Ford Health 200 (Michigan)
- Last race: 2025 Atlas 150 (Iowa)
Wins	Top tens	Poles
0	0	0

ARCA Menards Series East career
- 2 races run over 1 year
- Best finish: 39th (2025)
- First race: 2025 LiUNA! 150 (IRP)
- Last race: 2025 Atlas 150 (Iowa)
Wins	Top tens	Poles
0	0	0
- Statistics up to date as of August 2, 2025.

Regina Sirvent (born February 13, 2003) is a Mexican professional stock car racing driver who last competed part-time in the ARCA Menards Series, driving the No. 68 Ford for Kimmel Racing.

== Racing career ==
Sirvent has previously competed in series such as the NASCAR Mexico Truck Series, where she became the first woman to win a race, and the first Hispanic driver to win a NASCAR international race, the NASCAR Mexico Challenge Series, and the NASCAR Weekly Series, and is a former member of the NASCAR Drive for Diversity Driver Development Program.

In 2023, it was announced that Sirvent would drive a partial schedule in the ARCA Menards Series, driving for Venturini Motorsports, although she did not start a race in the series that year.

In 2025, it was revealed that Sirvent would participate in the pre-season test for the ARCA Menards Series at Daytona International Speedway, driving the No. 3 Chevrolet for Mullins Racing, where she placed 35th over the two days of testing. Several months later, it was revealed that Sirvent would make her debut in the series at Michigan International Speedway, driving the No. 68 Ford for Kimmel Racing.

== Personal life ==
Sirvent's grandfather, José, was a former rally driver who won the Campeonato Mexicano de Rally in 1974.

== Motorsports career results ==
=== Stock car career summary ===
Season	Series	Team	Races	Wins	Top 5	Top 10	Points	Position
2025	ARCA Menards Series East	Kimmel Racing	2	0	0	0	58	39th
2025	ARCA Menards Series	Kimmel Racing	3	0	0	0	88	50th

=== ARCA Menards Series ===
(key) (Bold – Pole position awarded by qualifying time. Italics – Pole position earned by points standings or practice time. * – Most laps led. ** – All laps led.)

ARCA Menards Series results
Year	Team	No.	Make	1	2	3	4	5	6	7	8	9	10	11	12	13	14	15	16	17	18	19	20	AMSC	Pts	Ref
2025	Kimmel Racing	68	Ford	DAY	PHO	TAL	KAN	CLT	MCH; 14	BLN	ELK	LRP	DOV	IRP; 17	IOW; 13	GLN	ISF	MAD	DSF	BRI	SLM	KAN	TOL	50th	88	

==== ARCA Menards Series East ====
ARCA Menards Series East results
Year	Team	No.	Make	1	2	3	4	5	6	7	8	AMSEC	Pts	Ref
2025	Kimmel Racing	68	Ford	FIF	CAR	NSV	FRS	DOV	IRP; 17	IOW; 13	BRI	39th	58	
