= 2024 Shore Lunch 250 =

12th race of the 2024 ARCA Menards Series

2024 Shore Lunch 250 presented by Dutch Boy Paints
Race details
- Race 12 of 20 of the 2024 ARCA Menards Series
- Date: August 3, 2024
- Official name: 9th Annual Shore Lunch 250 presented by Dutch Boy Paints
- Location: Elko Speedway in Elko New Market, Minnesota
- Course: Permanent racing facility
- Course length: 0.375 miles (0.604 km)
- Distance: 250 laps, 93 mi (150 km)
- Scheduled distance: 250 laps, 93 mi (150 km)
- Average speed: 65.483 mph (105.385 km/h)

Pole position
Driver	William Sawalich	Joe Gibbs Racing
- Time: 14.393

Most laps led
Driver	William Sawalich	Joe Gibbs Racing
- Laps: 150

Winner
No. 18	William Sawalich	Joe Gibbs Racing

Television in the United States
- Network: FS1
- Announcers: Brent Stover and Phil Parsons

Radio in the United States
- Radio: ARCA Racing Network

The 2024 Shore Lunch 250 presented by Dutch Boy Paints was the 12th stock car race of the 2024 ARCA Menards Series season, and the 9th iteration of the event. The race was held on Saturday, August 3, 2024, at Elko Speedway in Elko New Market, Minnesota, a 0.375 miles (0.604 km) permanent oval shaped racetrack. The race took the scheduled 250 laps to complete. In a wild finish, William Sawalich, driving for Joe Gibbs Racing, would rebound from several amounts of adversity following a late-race spin, including an ill-handling car, and held off Lavar Scott and Kris Wright in a three-wide photo finish to earn his ninth career ARCA Menards Series win, and his fifth of the season. Sawalich won the race by 0.011 seconds over Scott, one of the closest finishes in ARCA history. Sawalich dominated the majority of the race, leading 147 laps before getting spun by the lap car of Michael Maples on lap 150. He eventually rebounded and battled Lavar Scott in the final closing laps, winning the race in a remarkable three-wide photo finish as the leaders went sideways across the line. Scott was officially credited with a 2nd place finish, with Kris Wright finishing 3rd.

== Report ==
=== Background ===
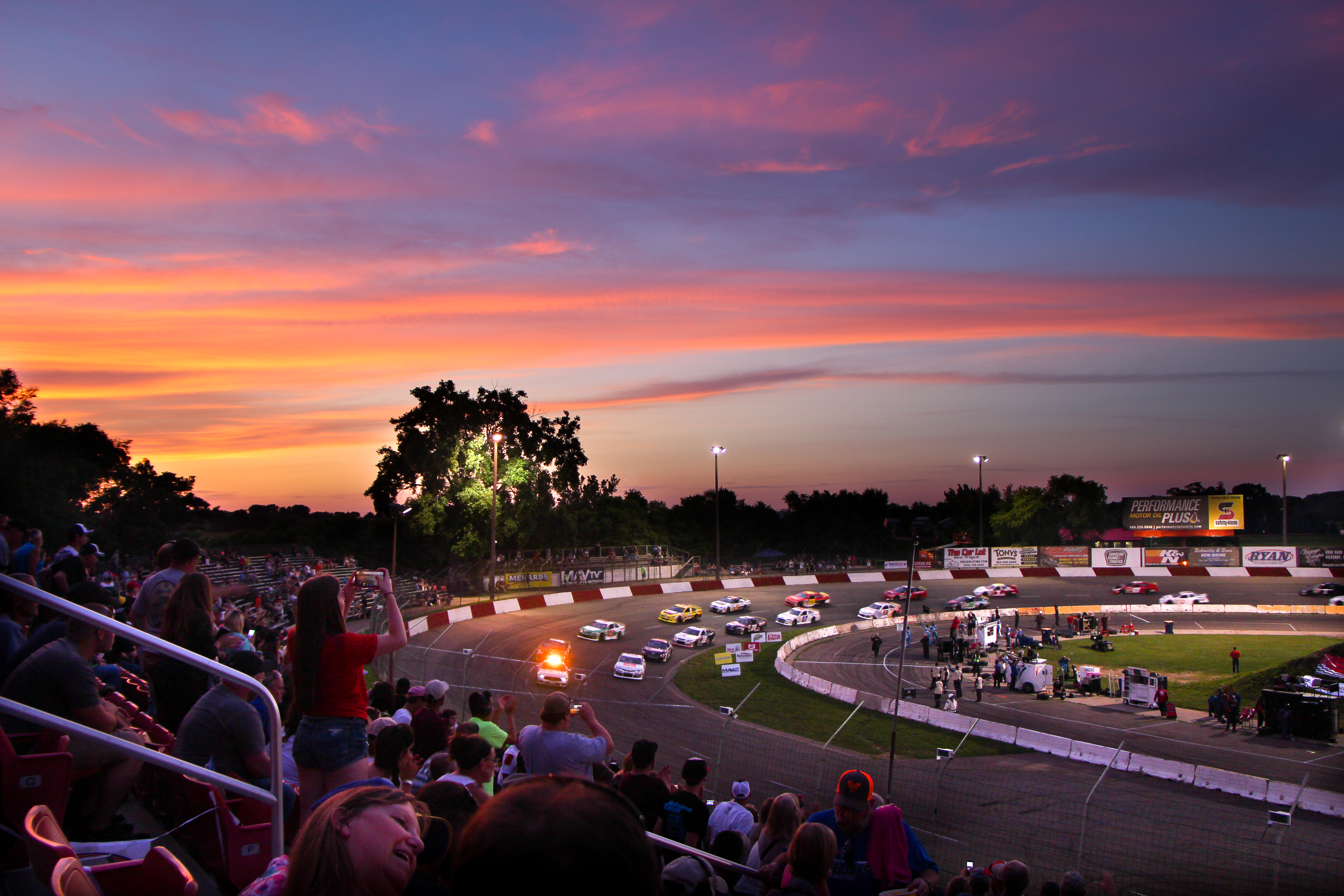
Elko Speedway, the circuit where the race was held.

Elko Speedway is a 3/8 mile asphalt oval NASCAR-sanctioned race track located in Elko New Market, Minnesota. Elko Speedway is a track in the NASCAR Advance Auto Parts Weekly Series. The track is located in the former Elko portion of the merged city.

The ARCA racing series held the Akona 200, their first ever race in Minnesota, at Elko Speedway on June 2, 2012. The series returned in 2013 and 2014 for the Akona 250, adding 50 laps to the event. Elko is the shortest track ARCA currently races on.

==== Entry list ====
- (R) denotes rookie driver.

#	Driver	Team	Make	Sponsor
2	Andrés Pérez de Lara	Rev Racing	Chevrolet	Max Siegel Inc.
03	Alex Clubb	Clubb Racing Inc.	Ford	A. Clubb Lawn Care & Landscaping
06	Nate Moeller	Wayne Peterson Racing	Toyota	Peterson Motorsports
6	Lavar Scott (R)	Rev Racing	Chevrolet	Max Siegel Inc.
10	Bryce Haugeberg	Fast Track Racing	Ford	Brenco / Haugeberg Farms / UTI
11	Cody Dennison (R)	Fast Track Racing	Toyota	Timcast
12	Ryan Roulette	Fast Track Racing	Ford	Bellator Recruiting Academy / VFW
15	Kris Wright	Venturini Motorsports	Toyota	FNB Corporation
18	William Sawalich	Joe Gibbs Racing	Toyota	Starkey / SoundGear
20	Sean Hingorani	Venturini Motorsports	Toyota	Fidelity Capital
22	Amber Balcaen	Venturini Motorsports	Toyota	ICON Direct
25	Toni Breidinger	Venturini Motorsports	Toyota	Sunoco
31	Rick Redig-Tackman	Rise Motorsports	Chevrolet	Max Buchanan Foundation
32	Christian Rose	AM Racing	Ford	West Virginia Department of Tourism
35	Greg Van Alst	Greg Van Alst Motorsports	Ford	CB Fabricating / Top Choice Fence
45	E. J. Tamayo	Tamayo Cosentino Racing	Ford	AMICI Engineering Contractors
48	Brad Smith	Brad Smith Motorsports	Ford	Ski's Graphics
55	Isabella Robusto	Venturini Motorsports	Toyota	Mobil 1
86	Brian Clubb	Clubb Racing Inc.	Ford	CRS Suspension
99	Michael Maples (R)	Fast Track Racing	Chevrolet	Don Ray Petroleum LLC
Official entry list

== Practice ==
The first and only practice session was held on Saturday, August 3, at 3:40 PM CST, and would last for 55 minutes. William Sawalich, driving for Joe Gibbs Racing, would set the fastest time in the session, with a lap of 14.558, and a speed of 92.733 mph (149.239 km/h).

Pos.	#	Driver	Team	Make	Time	Speed
1	18	William Sawalich	Joe Gibbs Racing	Toyota	14.558	92.733
2	55	Isabella Robusto	Venturini Motorsports	Toyota	14.646	92.175
3	6	Lavar Scott (R)	Rev Racing	Chevrolet	14.651	92.144
Full practice results

== Qualifying ==
Qualifying was held on Saturday, August 3, at 5:20 PM CST. The qualifying system used is a single-car, two-lap system with only one round. Drivers will be on track by themselves and will have two laps to post a qualifying time, and whoever sets the fastest time in that round will win the pole.

William Sawalich, driving for Joe Gibbs Racing, would score the pole for the race, with a lap of 14.393, and a speed of 93.796 mph (150.950 km/h).

=== Qualifying results ===
Pos.	#	Driver	Team	Make	Time	Speed
1	18	William Sawalich	Joe Gibbs Racing	Toyota	14.393	93.796
2	15	Kris Wright	Venturini Motorsports	Toyota	14.438	93.503
3	55	Isabella Robusto	Venturini Motorsports	Toyota	14.459	93.367
4	6	Lavar Scott (R)	Rev Racing	Chevrolet	14.480	93.232
5	2	Andrés Pérez de Lara	Rev Racing	Chevrolet	14.576	92.618
6	20	Sean Hingorani	Venturini Motorsports	Toyota	14.641	92.207
7	35	Greg Van Alst	Greg Van Alst Motorsports	Ford	14.661	92.081
8	32	Christian Rose	AM Racing	Ford	14.679	91.968
9	25	Toni Breidinger	Venturini Motorsports	Toyota	14.797	91.235
10	45	E. J. Tamayo	Tamayo Cosentino Racing	Ford	14.804	91.192
11	22	Amber Balcaen	Venturini Motorsports	Toyota	14.812	91.142
12	31	Rick Redig-Tackman	Rise Motorsports	Chevrolet	14.980	90.120
13	11	Cody Dennison (R)	Fast Track Racing	Toyota	15.112	89.333
14	03	Alex Clubb	Clubb Racing Inc.	Ford	15.186	88.898
15	12	Ryan Roulette	Fast Track Racing	Ford	15.254	88.501
16	99	Michael Maples (R)	Fast Track Racing	Chevrolet	15.374	87.811
17	10	Bryce Haugeberg	Fast Track Racing	Ford	15.480	87.209
18	06	Nate Moeller	Wayne Peterson Racing	Toyota	16.127	83.711
19	48	Brad Smith	Brad Smith Motorsports	Ford	16.342	82.609
20	86	Brian Clubb	Clubb Racing Inc.	Ford	16.727	80.708
Official qualifying results

== Race results ==
Fin	St	#	Driver	Team	Make	Laps	Led	Status	Pts
1	1	18	William Sawalich	Joe Gibbs Racing	Toyota	250	150	Running	49
2	4	6	Lavar Scott (R)	Rev Racing	Chevrolet	250	100	Running	43
3	2	15	Kris Wright	Venturini Motorsports	Toyota	250	0	Running	41
4	3	55	Isabella Robusto	Venturini Motorsports	Toyota	250	0	Running	40
5	5	2	Andrés Pérez de Lara	Rev Racing	Chevrolet	250	0	Running	39
6	10	45	E. J. Tamayo	Tamayo Cosentino Racing	Ford	250	0	Running	38
7	9	25	Toni Breidinger	Venturini Motorsports	Toyota	250	0	Running	37
8	6	20	Sean Hingorani	Venturini Motorsports	Toyota	250	0	Running	36
9	7	35	Greg Van Alst	Greg Van Alst Motorsports	Ford	247	0	Running	35
10	8	32	Christian Rose	AM Racing	Ford	245	0	Running	34
11	13	11	Cody Dennison (R)	Fast Track Racing	Toyota	243	0	Running	33
12	11	22	Amber Balcaen	Venturini Motorsports	Toyota	243	0	Running	32
13	17	10	Bryce Haugeberg	Fast Track Racing	Ford	241	0	Running	31
14	15	12	Ryan Roulette	Fast Track Racing	Ford	238	0	Running	30
15	16	99	Michael Maples (R)	Fast Track Racing	Chevrolet	238	0	Running	29
16	14	03	Alex Clubb	Clubb Racing Inc.	Ford	236	0	Running	28
17	20	86	Brian Clubb	Clubb Racing Inc.	Ford	94	0	Withdrew	27
18	12	31	Rick Redig-Tackman	Rise Motorsports	Chevrolet	86	0	Radiator	26
19	18	06	Nate Moeller	Wayne Peterson Racing	Toyota	43	0	Electrical	25
20	19	48	Brad Smith	Brad Smith Motorsports	Ford	16	0	Handling	24
Official race results

== Standings after the race ==
Drivers' Championship standings

	Pos	Driver	Points
	1	Andrés Pérez de Lara	562
	2	Lavar Scott	519 (-43)
	3	Greg Van Alst	497 (–65)
	4	Kris Wright	491 (–71)
	5	Christian Rose	472 (–90)
	6	Toni Breidinger	467 (–95)
	7	Amber Balcaen	455 (–107)
	8	Michael Maples	421 (–141)
1	9	Cody Dennison	407 (–155)
1	10	Alex Clubb	404 (–158)

- Note: Only the first 10 positions are included for the driver standings.

Previous race: 2024 Salem ARCA 200	ARCA Menards Series; 2024 season	Next race: 2024 Henry Ford Health 200
