= Colby Evans =

American racing driver (born 2001)

- Born: July 2, 2001 (age 25); Prole, Iowa, U.S.

ARCA Menards Series career
- 1 race run over 1 year
- Best finish: 127th (2025)
- First race: 2025 Atlas 150 (Iowa)
Wins	Top tens	Poles
0	0	0

ARCA Menards Series East career
- 1 race run over 1 year
- Best finish: 67th (2025)
- First race: 2025 Atlas 150 (Iowa)
Wins	Top tens	Poles
0	0	0
- Statistics up to date as of August 2, 2025.

Colby Evans (born July 2, 2001) is an American professional stock car racing driver and crew member. He last competed part-time in the ARCA Menards Series, driving the No. 86 Ford for Clubb Racing Inc.

== Racing career ==
Evans' involvement in racing started in his teenage years, serving as a crew member for lower-funded teams throughout NASCAR and the ARCA Racing Series, including MBM Motorsports, Hill Motorsports, Norm Benning Racing, Brad Smith Motorsports and Wayne Peterson Racing. He also started a social media page dedicated to start and park drivers and teams.

Evans stepped behind the wheel in the 2020s, driving in a few dirt track racing events as well as a stock car race at Salem Speedway, driving a car previously used by Michael Waltrip and Bill Davis Racing. Evans initially aimed to make his ARCA debut in 2024, targeting tracks like Iowa Speedway, Elko Speedway, Indianapolis Raceway Park, and Kansas Speedway. On June 25, 2025, Evans announced his ARCA debut, driving Clubb Racing Inc.'s No. 86 at Iowa. He finished in 23rd due to transmission issues. He also purchased a Car of Tomorrow chassis in late 2024 and planned to run the car in several vintage racing events in 2025.

Regarding his racing philosophy, Evans said, "it’s now or never, you got all of this money saved in the bank, do it. It’s just living the dream and if I’m a start and park legend, I’m a start and park legend. If I never win I never win...but I can say, I competed in a freaking stock car race.”

== Motorsports career results ==
=== ARCA Menards Series ===
(key) (Bold – Pole position awarded by qualifying time. Italics – Pole position earned by points standings or practice time. * – Most laps led.)

ARCA Menards Series results
Year	Team	No.	Make	1	2	3	4	5	6	7	8	9	10	11	12	13	14	15	16	17	18	19	20	AMSC	Pts	Ref
2025	Clubb Racing Inc.	86	Ford	DAY	PHO	TAL	KAN	CLT	MCH	BLN	ELK	LRP	DOV	IRP	IOW; 23	GLN	ISF	MAD	DSF	BRI	SLM	KAN	TOL	127th	21	

==== ARCA Menards Series East ====
ARCA Menards Series East results
Year	Team	No.	Make	1	2	3	4	5	6	7	8	AMSEC	Pts	Ref
2025	Clubb Racing Inc.	86	Ford	FIF	CAR	NSV	FRS	DOV	IRP	IOW; 23	BRI	67th	21	

^{*} Season still in progress
^{1} Ineligible for series points
