= Doug Miller (racing driver) =

American racing driver (born 1981)

- Born: November 26, 1981 (age 44); Satsuma, Florida, U.S.

ARCA Menards Series career
- 1 race run over 1 year
- Best finish: 139th (2025)
- First race: 2025 LiUNA! 150 (IRP)
Wins	Top tens	Poles
0	0	0

ARCA Menards Series East career
- 1 race run over 1 year
- Best finish: 75th (2025)
- First race: 2025 LiUNA! 150 (IRP)
Wins	Top tens	Poles
0	0	0
- Statistics up to date as of September 28, 2025.

Doug Miller (born November 26, 1981) is an American professional stock car racing driver who last competed part-time in the ARCA Menards Series, driving the No. 86 Ford for Clubb Racing Inc.

== Racing career ==
In 2025, it was revealed that Miller would participate in the pre-season test for the ARCA Menards Series at Daytona International Speedway, driving the No. 03 Ford for Clubb Racing Inc., where he would place the 69th quickest time within the two days of testing. A couple months later, he would run the pre-race practice session for the team at Kansas Speedway, this time driving the No. 86 Ford, where he placed 21st overall.

Several months later, it was revealed that Miller would make his debut in ARCA at Lucas Oil Indianapolis Raceway Park, driving the No. 86 for CRI. It also served as his debut in the ARCA Menards Series East as it was a combination race with the main ARCA series. After starting in 23rd due to qualifying being rained out, he placed 35th in practice and finished in 33rd after running only ten laps.

== Personal life ==
Miller is the father of three children, and currently resides in Hilliard, Florida.

Miller's grandfather was a former competitor on the Daytona Beach and Road Course in the 1950's.

== Motorsports results ==
=== ARCA Menards Series ===
(key) (Bold – Pole position awarded by qualifying time. Italics – Pole position earned by points standings or practice time. * – Most laps led.)

ARCA Menards Series results
Year	Team	No.	Make	1	2	3	4	5	6	7	8	9	10	11	12	13	14	15	16	17	18	19	20	AMSC	Pts	Ref
2025	Clubb Racing Inc.	86	Ford	DAY	PHO	TAL	KAN	CLT	MCH	BLN	ELK	LRP	DOV	IRP; 33	IOW	GLN	ISF	MAD	DSF	BRI	SLM	KAN	TOL	139th	11	

==== ARCA Menards Series East ====
ARCA Menards Series East results
Year	Team	No.	Make	1	2	3	4	5	6	7	8	AMSEC	Pts	Ref
2025	Clubb Racing Inc.	86	Ford	FIF	CAR	NSV	FRS	DOV	IRP; 33	IOW	BRI	75th	11	
