= Kole Raz =

American racing driver (born 2003)

- Born: March 13, 2003 (age 23); Lake Oswego, Oregon, U.S.

NASCAR O'Reilly Auto Parts Series career
- 2 races run over 1 year
- 2025 position: 70th
- Best finish: 70th (2025)
- First race: 2025 Nu Way 200 (Gateway)
- Last race: 2025 Kansas Lottery 300 (Kansas)
Wins	Top tens	Poles
0	0	0

ARCA Menards Series career
- 6 races run over 2 years
- Best finish: 29th (2025)
- First race: 2025 Ride the 'Dente 200 (Daytona)
- Last race: 2026 General Tire 200 (Daytona)
Wins	Top tens	Poles
0	3	0

ARCA Menards Series East career
- 2 races run over 1 year
- Best finish: 32nd (2025)
- First race: 2025 Pensacola 150 (Pensacola)
- Last race: 2025 Rockingham ARCA 125 (Rockingham)
Wins	Top tens	Poles
0	2	0

ARCA Menards Series West career
- 8 races run over 3 years
- Best finish: 12th (2024)
- First race: 2023 Shasta 150 (Shasta)
- Last race: 2025 General Tire 150 (Phoenix)
- First win: 2024 MMI Oil Workers 150 (Kern County)
Wins	Top tens	Poles
1	7	0
- Statistics up to date as of February 14, 2026.

Kole Raz (born March 13, 2003) is an American professional stock car racing driver. He last competed part-time in the ARCA Menards Series, driving the No. 76 Ford for Rette Jones Racing. He has previously competed in the NASCAR Xfinity Series, the ARCA Menards Series East, and the ARCA Menards Series West.

== Racing career ==
Raz has previously competed in series such as the Northwest Super Late Model Series, the Budweiser Crown Series, the ASA Southern Super Series, and the SRL Spears Southwest Tour Series. He found a majority of his success in the latter series, where he finished fifth in the points in 2021 with seven top-ten finishes.

In 2023, Raz made his debut in the ARCA Menards Series West at Shasta Speedway, driving the No. 5 Toyota for Jerry Pitts Racing. After placing tenth in the lone practice session, he qualified in fifth and finished in third behind Trevor Huddleston and Sean Hingorani. It was later revealed that Raz would run the following race at Evergreen Speedway with JPR. After placing third in the lone practice session, he qualified in fourth and once again finished in third, this time behind Tyler Reif and Sean Hingorani.

In 2024, it was revealed that he would return with JPR at Kevin Harvick's Kern Raceway, once again driving the No. 5 Toyota for JPR. He would go on to pick up his first win in the series in this race.

On September 1, 2025, it was revealed that Raz would make his NASCAR Xfinity Series debut at World Wide Technology Raceway with a second AM Racing entry, the No. 76.

== Personal life ==
Raz is the younger brother of Gracin Raz, who has also competed in the West Series, then known as the NASCAR K&N Pro Series West, from 2014 to 2017.

Raz is the nephew of Douglas J. Raz, a painter at the West Hills Collision Center in Portland, Oregon.

== Motorsports career results ==
=== Stock car career summary ===
Season	Series	Team	Races	Wins	Top 5	Top 10	Points	Position
2023	ARCA Menards Series West	Jerry Pitts Racing	2	0	2	2	82	24th
2024	ARCA Menards Series West	Jerry Pitts Racing	4	1	1	3	235	12th
2024	ARCA Menards Series West	AM Racing	1	0	0	1	235	12th
2025	ASA STARS National Tour	Rette Jones Racing	1	0	0	1	88	33rd
2025	ASA STARS National Tour	Kole Raz	1	0	0	0	88	33rd
2025	ARCA Menards Series West	AM Racing	1	0	0	1	38	47th
2025	ARCA Menards Series East	AM Racing	2	0	1	2	74	32nd
2025	ARCA Menards Series	AM Racing	5	0	0	2	147	29th
2025	NASCAR Xfinity Series	AM Racing	2	0	0	0	5	70th
2026	ASA STARS National Tour	Kole Raz	1	0	0	0		
2026	CARS Pro Late Model Tour	Kole Raz Racing	1	0	0	0	29	53rd
2026	ARCA Menards Series	Rette Jones Racing	1	0	1	1	29	106th

=== NASCAR ===
(key) (Bold – Pole position awarded by qualifying time. Italics – Pole position earned by points standings or practice time. * – Most laps led.)

==== Xfinity Series ====
NASCAR Xfinity Series results
Year	Team	No.	Make	1	2	3	4	5	6	7	8	9	10	11	12	13	14	15	16	17	18	19	20	21	22	23	24	25	26	27	28	29	30	31	32	33	NXSC	Pts	Ref
2025	AM Racing	76	Ford	DAY	ATL	COA	PHO	LVS	HOM	MAR	DAR	BRI	CAR	TAL	TEX	CLT	NSH	MXC	POC	ATL	CSC	SON	DOV	IND	IOW	GLN	DAY	PIR	GTW; 34	BRI	KAN; 35	ROV	LVS	TAL	MAR	PHO	70th	5	

^{*} Season still in progress
^{1} Ineligible for series points

=== ARCA Menards Series ===
(key) (Bold – Pole position awarded by qualifying time. Italics – Pole position earned by points standings or practice time. * – Most laps led. ** – All laps led.)

ARCA Menards Series results
Year	Team	No.	Make	1	2	3	4	5	6	7	8	9	10	11	12	13	14	15	16	17	18	19	20	AMSC	Pts	Ref
2025	AM Racing	76	Ford	DAY; 6	PHO; 6	TAL; 22	KAN	CLT; 21	MCH; 18	BLN	ELK	LRP	DOV	IRP	IOW	GLN	ISF	MAD	DSF	BRI	SLM	KAN	TOL	29th	147	
2026	Rette Jones Racing	76	Ford	DAY; 3	PHO	KAN	TAL	GLN	TOL	MCH	POC	BER	ELK	CHI	LRP	IRP	IOW	ISF	MAD	DSF	SLM	BRI	KAN	106th	29	

==== ARCA Menards Series East ====
ARCA Menards Series East results
Year	Team	No.	Make	1	2	3	4	5	6	7	8	AMSEC	Pts	Ref
2025	AM Racing	76	Ford	FIF; 2	CAR; 7	NSV	FRS	DOV	IRP	IOW	BRI	32nd	74	

==== ARCA Menards Series West ====
ARCA Menards Series West results
Year	Team	No.	Make	1	2	3	4	5	6	7	8	9	10	11	12	AMSWC	Pts	Ref
2023	Jerry Pitts Racing	5	Toyota	PHO	IRW	KCR	PIR	SON	IRW	SHA; 3	EVG; 3	AAS	LVS	MAD	PHO	24th	82	
2024	Jerry Pitts Racing	5	Toyota	PHO	KER; 1	PIR	SON	IRW; 17	IRW; 6	SHA	TRI	MAD	AAS	KER; 6		12th	235	
2024	AM Racing	76	Ford												PHO; 9	12th	235	
2025	AM Racing	76	Ford	KER	PHO; 6	TUC	CNS	KER	SON	TRI	PIR	AAS	MAD	LVS	PHO	47th	38	

=== CARS Pro Late Model Tour ===
(key)

CARS Pro Late Model Tour results
Year	Team	No.	Make	1	2	3	4	5	6	7	8	9	10	11	CPLMTC	Pts	Ref
2026	Kole Raz Racing	27R	Ford	SNM	NSV	CRW	ACE	NWS	HCY	AND	FLC	TCM; 13	NPS	SBO	53rd	29	

=== ASA STARS National Tour ===
(key) (Bold – Pole position awarded by qualifying time. Italics – Pole position earned by points standings or practice time. * – Most laps led. ** – All laps led.)

ASA STARS National Tour results
Year	Team	No.	Make	1	2	3	4	5	6	7	8	9	10	11	12	ASNTC	Pts	Ref
2025	Rette Jones Racing	30R	Ford	NSM	FIF	DOM	HCY	NPS	MAD	SLG	AND; 8					33rd	88	
2025	Kole Raz	27	N/A									OWO; 17	TOL	WIN	NSV	33rd	88	
2026	Kole Raz	76	Ford	NSM; 30	FIF	HCY	SLG	MAD	NPS	OWO	TRI; Wth	WIN	NSV	NSM		-*	-*	
