= Eloy Falcón =

Mexican racing driver (born 2005)

- Born: Eloy Sebastián López Falcón; February 9, 2005 (age 21); Mexico City, Mexico

ARCA Menards Series career
- 3 races run over 1 year
- Best finish: 43rd (2025)
- First race: 2025 Henry Ford Health 200 (Michigan)
- Last race: 2025 Reese's 150 (Kansas)
Wins	Top tens	Poles
0	2	0

ARCA Menards Series East career
- 2 races run over 1 year
- Best finish: 30th (2025)
- First race: 2025 Rockingham ARCA 125 (Rockingham)
- Last race: 2025 Atlas 150 (Iowa)
Wins	Top tens	Poles
0	2	0
- Statistics up to date as of September 26, 2025.

Eloy Sebastián López Falcón (born February 9, 2005) is a Mexican professional stock car racing driver who last competed part-time in the ARCA Menards Series, driving the No. 2 Chevrolet for Rev Racing, part-time in the ARCA Menards Series East, driving the No. 10 Chevrolet for Fast Track Racing with Rev Racing as well as in the NASCAR Mexico Series.

== Racing career ==
Prior to making his debut in the ARCA Menards Series in 2025, Falcón competed in local events in Mexico, as well as running in the NACAM Formula 4 Championship and the Spanish F4 Championship.

In 2025, it was revealed that Falcón would participate in the pre-season test for the ARCA Menards Series at Daytona International Speedway, driving the No. 2L Chevrolet for Rev Racing. On February 6, it was announced that he would drive part-time in 2025 for Rev along with Lanie Buice.

== Motorsports career results ==
=== Complete NACAM Formula 4 Championship results ===
(key) (Races in bold indicate pole position) (Races in italics indicate fastest lap)

Year	Team	1	2	3	4	5	6	7	8	9	10	11	12	13	14	15	16	17	18	19	20	Pos	Points
2018–19	Rand Team	AHR1; 1	AHR1; 2	PUE; 1	PUE; 2	PUE; 3	SLP; 1	SLP; 2	SLP; 3	MTY; 1	MTY; 2	MTY; 3	AGS; 1	AGS; 2	AGS; 3	PUE; 1	PUE; 2	PUE; 3	AHR2; 1; 10	AHR2; 2; 6	AHR2; 3; 6	14th	17
2019–20	Rand Team by Tiger	AHR; 1; 12	AHR; 2; 11	AGS; 1 Ret	AGS; 2; 13	AGS; 3; 10	PUE; 1	PUE; 2	PUE; 3	MER; 1	MER; 2	MER; 3	QUE1; 1	QUE1; 2	QUE1; 3	QUE2; 1	QUE2; 2	QUE2; 3	MTY; 1	MTY; 2	MTY; 3	23rd	1

=== Complete F4 Spanish Championship results ===
(key) (Races in bold indicate pole position) (Races in italics indicate fastest lap)

Year	Team	1	2	3	4	5	6	7	8	9	10	11	12	13	14	15	16	17	18	19	20	21	DC	Points
2020	Global Racing Service	NAV; 1; 15	NAV; 2; 17	NAV; 3; 12	LEC; 1; 18	LEC; 2; 17	LEC; 3; 19	JER; 1 Ret	JER; 2; 13	JER; 3; 8	CRT; 1; 15	CRT; 2; 13	CRT; 3; 18	ARA; 1; 13	ARA; 2 Ret	ARA; 3; 12	JAR; 1 DNA	JAR; 2 DNA	JAR; 3 DNA	CAT; 1	CAT; 2	CAT; 3	21st	4

=== ARCA Menards Series ===
(key) (Bold – Pole position awarded by qualifying time. Italics – Pole position earned by points standings or practice time. * – Most laps led. ** – All laps led.)

ARCA Menards Series results
Year	Team	No.	Make	1	2	3	4	5	6	7	8	9	10	11	12	13	14	15	16	17	18	19	20	AMSC	Pts	Ref
2025	Rev Racing	2	Chevy	DAY	PHO	TAL	KAN	CLT	MCH; 10	BLN	ELK	LRP	DOV	IRP	IOW; 8	GLN	ISF	MAD	DSF	BRI	SLM	KAN; 12	TOL	43rd	102	

==== ARCA Menards Series East ====
ARCA Menards Series East results
Year	Team	No.	Make	1	2	3	4	5	6	7	8	AMSEC	Pts	Ref
2025	Fast Track Racing with Rev Racing	10	Chevy	FIF	CAR; 3	NSV	FRS	DOV	IRP			30th	77	
2025	Rev Racing	2	Chevy							IOW; 8	BRI	30th	77	
