= Kevin Reed Jr. =

American NASCAR and ARCA crew chief

Personal information
- Born: January 10, 1998 (age 28) Mooresville, North Carolina, U.S.

Sport
- Country: United States
- Sport: ARCA Menards Series
- Team: No. 77 Pinnacle Racing Group
- Updated on August 5, 2026

Kevin Reed Jr. (born January 10, 1998) is an American NASCAR and ARCA crew chief. He is employed at Pinnacle Racing Group as the crew chief for Taylor Reimer, Tristan McKee, and Lanie Buice in the No. 77 Chevrolet SS. He has crew chiefed since 2018.

== Racing career ==
=== K&N Pro Series West and East ===
==== Bill McAnally Racing ====
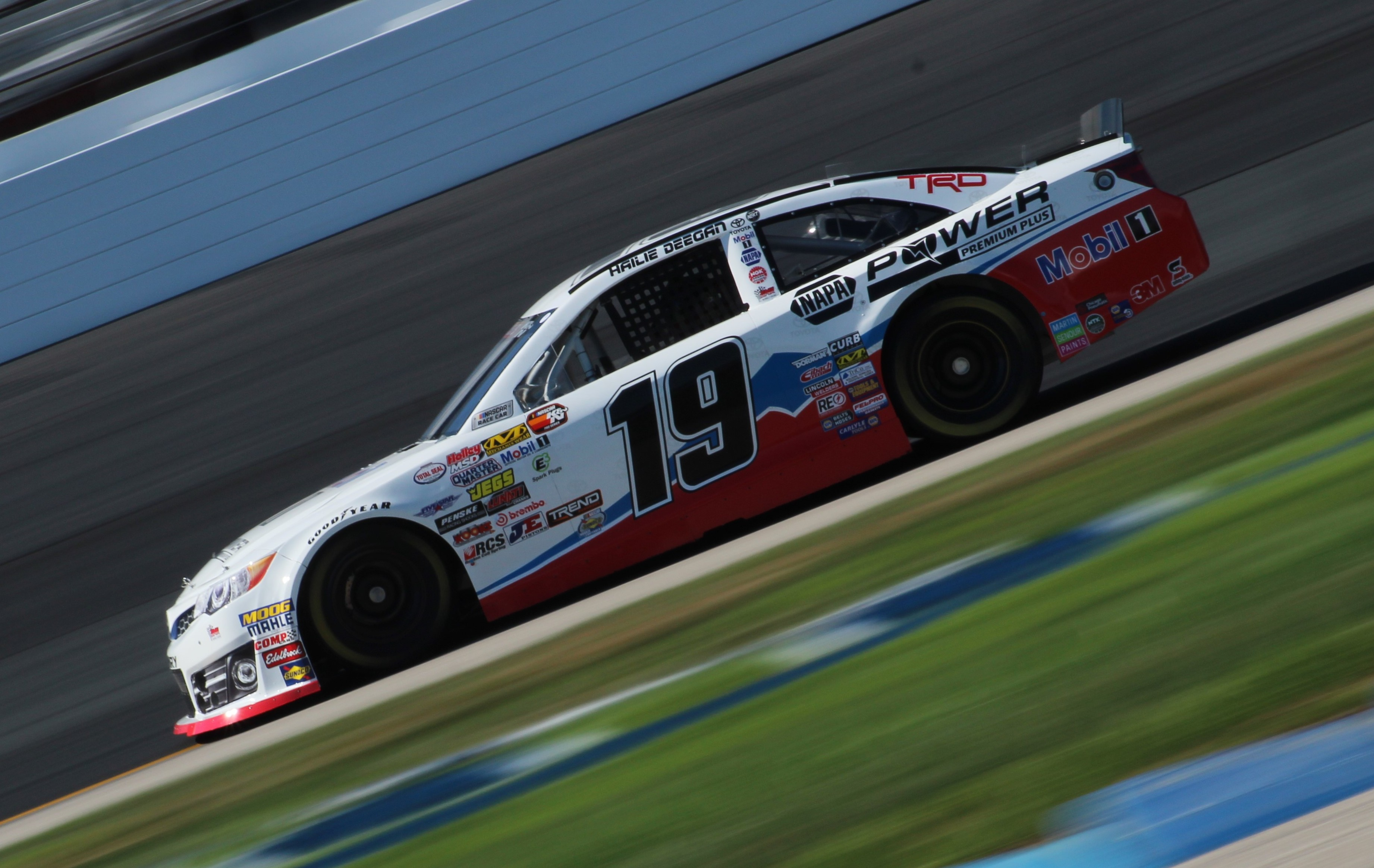
The No. 19 fielded by Bill McAnally Racing, which Reed served as crew chief of between 2018 and 2019.

Reed would start his career as a crew chief in 2018 for rookie Hailie Deegan and Bill McAnally Racing in the NASCAR K&N Pro Series West with select starts in the East. Between 2018 and 2019, the pair would score two wins at Meridian and the Las Vegas Dirt Track.

=== ARCA ===
==== Venturini Motorsports ====
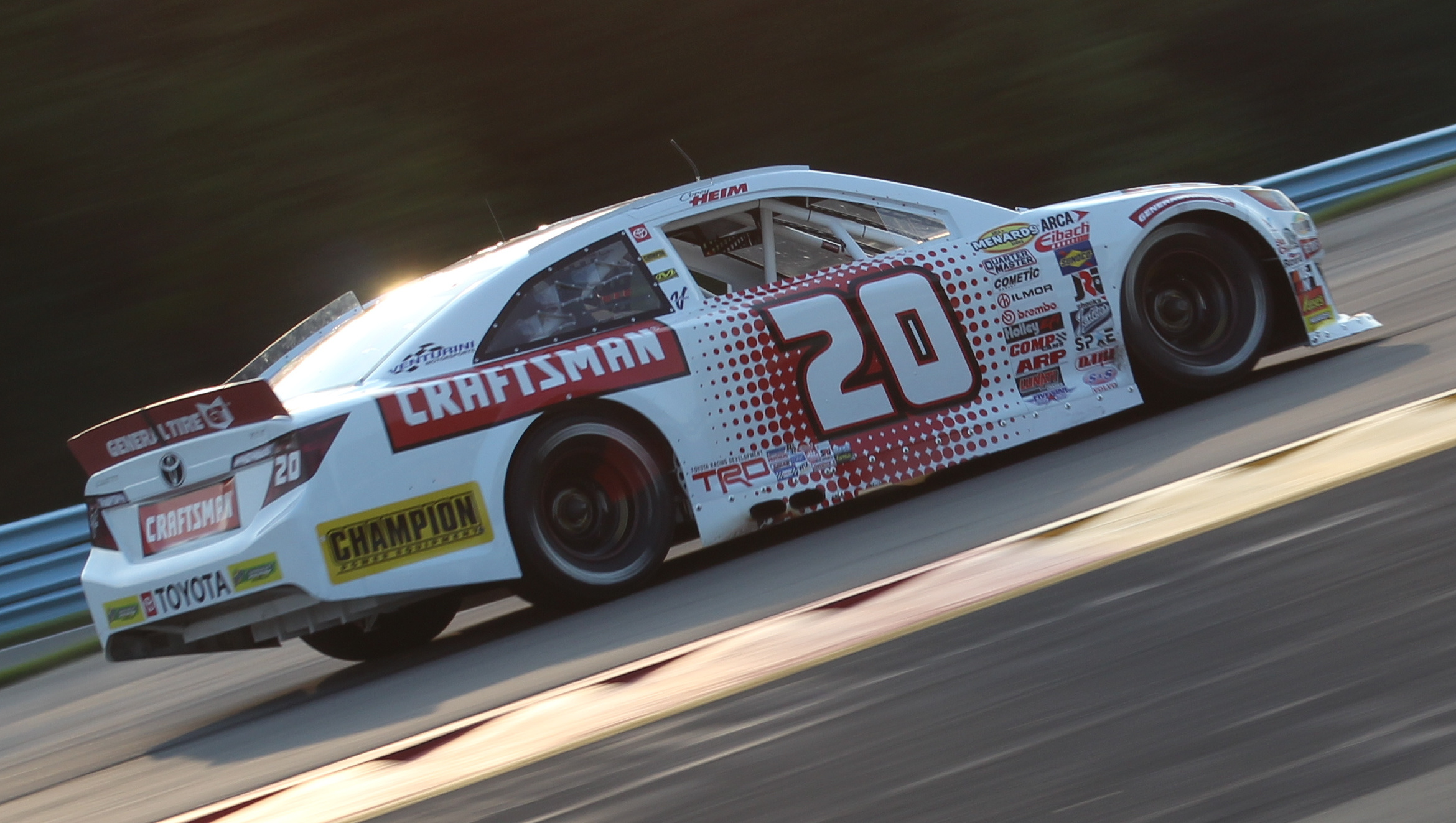
Corey Heim driving the No. 20 for Venturini at Watkins Glen in 2021.

In 2020, Reed would move over to Venturini Motorsports, where his father Kevin Reed Sr. was also a crew chief. That season, he would serve as crew chief for Corey Heim and Ryan Repko in two starts, scoring a win with Heim in the ARCA season finale at Kansas.

Reed would become a full-time crew chief for Venturini starting in 2022, with Toni Breidinger at the wheel driving the No. 25.

From 2023 to 2024, Reed would serve full-time across multiple teams for Venturini, under all three ARCA platform series.

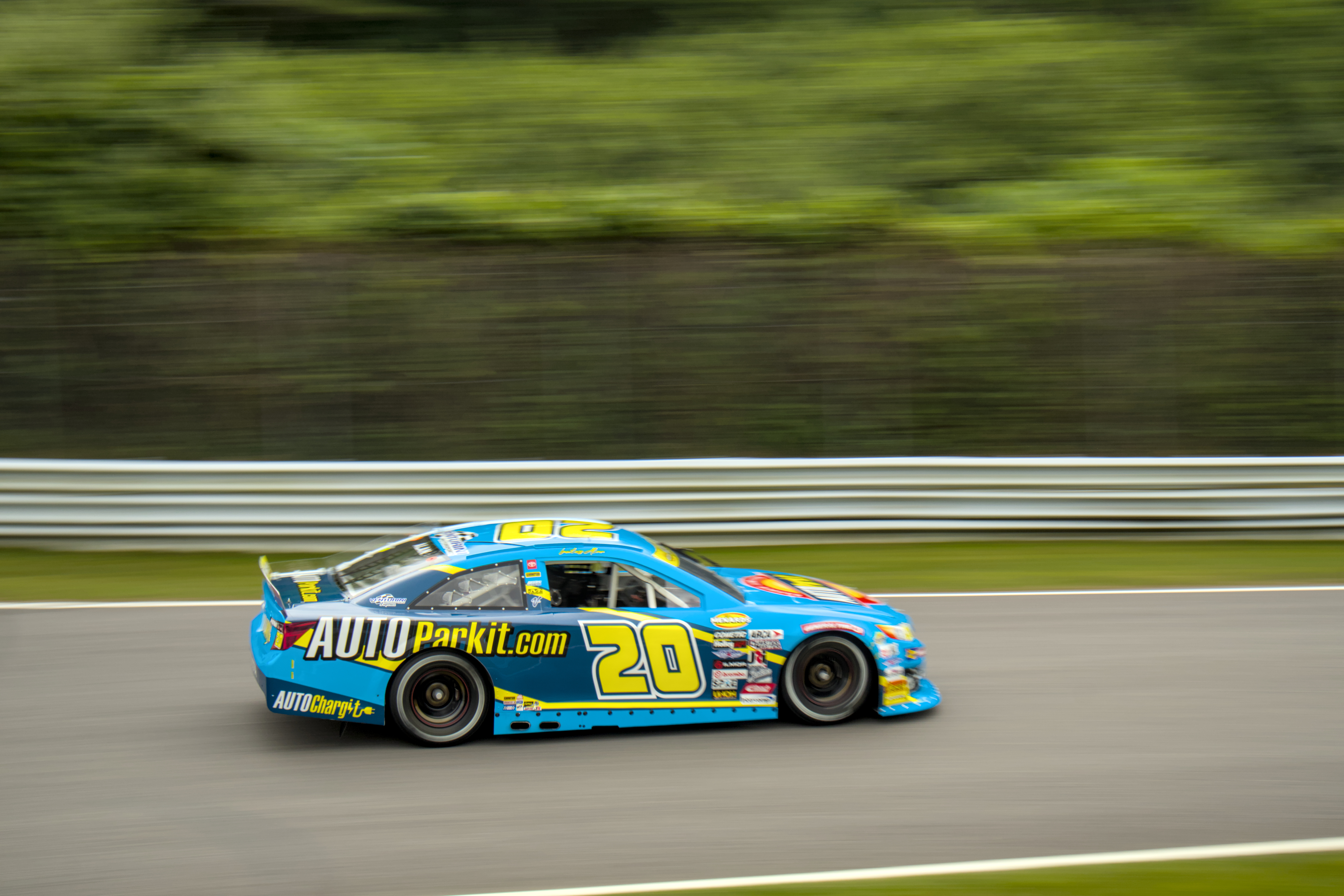
Lawless Alan piloting the No. 20 for Venturini in 2025.

In 2025, Reed would return full-time on the No. 20 car for the team with Lawless Alan, Leland Honeyman, and Julian DaCosta at the wheel. Alan and Reed would pick up Venturini's final career win as a team at Talladega in April that year, before selling to Nitro Motorsports and shuttering at seasons end.

==== Pinnacle Racing Group ====
The Pinnacle Racing Group No. 77 following Talladega in April 2026.

In 2026 Reed would move to Pinnacle Racing Group, serving as the full-time crew chief for the team's No. 77 car with Taylor Reimer, Tristan McKee, and Lanie Buice at the wheel. In the mainline ARCA series, Reed and McKee would score a win at Toledo in the combination race in May. The pairing would also score three wins to date in the East coming at Hickory, Rockingham, and the aforementioned combination race at Toledo.

== Crew chief statistics ==
=== ARCA Menards Series ===
Year	Driver	Races	Wins	Poles	Top 5	Top 10	DNFs	Position
2020	Corey Heim	1	1	0	1	1	0	28th
2021	Toni Breidinger	1	0	0	0	1	0	13th
2022	Toni Breidinger	18	0	0	0	5	4	6th
2023	Gus Dean	4	0	0	2	2	1	29th
2023	Conner Jones	4	0	0	2	4	0	15th
2023	Dean Thompson	1	0	0	1	1	0	24th
2023	Sean Hingorani	6	0	0	4	4	1	12th
2023	Toni Breidinger	2	0	0	2	2	0	9th
2023	Jake Finch	1	0	0	0	1	0	23rd
2024	Gus Dean	5	1	0	4	1	0	21st
2024	Isabella Robusto	2	0	0	1	2	0	35th
2024	Brent Crews	3	1	0	2	2	1	27th
2024	Dean Thompson	1	0	0	1	1	0	24th
2024	Sean Hingorani	2	0	0	1	2	0	37th
2024	Gio Ruggiero	6	0	0	3	5	0	13th
2025	Lawless Alan	16	1	2	10	10	1	5th
2025	Leland Honeyman	3	0	0	3	3	0	35th
2025	Julian DaCosta	1	0	0	0	1	0	61st
2026	Taylor Reimer	4	0	0	2	3	1	—*
2026	Tristan McKee	6	2	1	3	4	2	—*
2026	Lanie Buice	4	0	1	4	4	0	—*
Totals		92	6	4	45	59	11	

=== ARCA Menards Series East ===
Year	Driver	Races	Wins	Poles	Top 5	Top 10	DNFs	Position
2022	Jake Finch	1	0	0	0	1	0	6th
2022	Toni Breidinger	3	0	0	0	0	0	16th
2023	Sean Hingorani	7	0	1	5	6	0	7th
2023	Conner Jones	1	0	0	0	1	1	8th
2024	Jake Finch	1	0	0	0	1	0	27th
2024	Brent Crews	1	0	0	0	0	1	53rd
2024	Isabella Robusto	1	0	0	1	1	0	37th
2024	Toni Breidinger	1	0	0	1	1	0	10th
2024	Gus Dean	1	0	0	0	1	0	44th
2024	Gio Ruggiero	3	0	0	1	2	0	3rd
2025	Lawless Alan	2	0	0	2	2	0	20th
2025	Leland Honeyman	1	0	0	1	1	0	49th
2026	Tristan McKee	7	4	2	6	6	1	—*
Totals		30	4	3	17	23	3	

=== ARCA Menards Series West ===
Year	Driver	Races	Wins	Poles	Top 5	Top 10	DNFs	Position
2020	Ryan Repko	1	0	0	0	0	1	41st
2022	Toni Breidinger	1	0	0	0	0	0	58th
2022	Conner Jones	1	0	0	0	0	1	41st
2023	Sean Hingorani	9	2	2	5	6	2	1st
2023	Conner Jones	1	0	0	0	1	0	43rd
2024	Isabella Robusto	3	0	0	1	3	0	15th
2025	Lawless Alan	1	0	0	1	1	0	43rd
2025	Alon Day	1	0	0	1	1	0	26th
2025	Jade Avedisian	1	0	0	0	0	0	21st
2026	Tristan McKee	1	0	0	1	1	0	—*
Totals		20	2	2	9	13	4	

=== NASCAR K&N Pro Series East ===
Year	Driver	Races	Wins	Poles	Top 5	Top 10	DNFs	Position
2018	Hailie Deegan	2	0	0	0	0	2	20th
2019	Hailie Deegan	2	0	1	0	0	2	10th
Totals		4	0	1	0	0	4	

=== NASCAR K&N Pro Series West ===
Year	Driver	Races	Wins	Poles	Top 5	Top 10	DNFs	Position
2018	Hailie Deegan	5	1	2	2	3	2	5th
2019	Hailie Deegan	2	1	1	2	2	0	3rd
Totals		7	2	3	4	5	2	
