= 2025 Henry Ford Health 200 =

6th race of the 2025 ARCA Menards Series

Race details
- Race 6 of 20 of the 2025 ARCA Menards Series
- Date: June 6, 2025
- Official name: 37th Annual Henry Ford Health 200
- Location: Michigan International Speedway in Brooklyn, Michigan
- Course: Permanent racing facility
- Course length: 2.0 miles (3.2 km)
- Distance: 100 laps, 200 mi (320 km)
- Scheduled distance: 100 laps, 200 mi (320 km)
- Average speed: 144.549 mph (232.629 km/h)

Pole position
Driver	Brenden Queen	Pinnacle Racing Group
- Time: 38.841

Most laps led
Driver	Brenden Queen	Pinnacle Racing Group
- Laps: 65

Winner
No. 28	Brenden Queen	Pinnacle Racing Group

Television in the United States
- Network: FS2
- Announcers: Eric Brennan and Phil Parsons

Radio in the United States
- Radio: MRN

The 2025 Henry Ford Health 200 was the 6th stock car race of the 2025 ARCA Menards Series season, and the 37th iteration of the event. The race was held on Friday, June 6, 2025, at Michigan International Speedway in Brooklyn, Michigan, a 2.0 mile (3.2 km) permanent quad-oval shaped racetrack. The race took the scheduled 100 laps to complete. Brenden Queen, driving for Pinnacle Racing Group, would continue to impress with a dominating performance, leading a race-high 65 laps and holding off Corey Heim in the final laps to earn his third career ARCA Menards Series win, and his third of the season. Heim, filling in as a substitute driver for Jake Finch, finished second, while Lawless Alan finished third and rounded out the podium, respectively.

== Report ==
=== Entry list ===
- (R) denotes rookie driver.

#	Driver	Team	Make	Sponsor
0	Nate Moeller	Wayne Peterson Racing	Toyota	THDesigns / Nylo Tread / Big Fish BBQ
2	Eloy Sebastián	Rev Racing	Chevrolet	Max Siegel Inc.
03	Alex Clubb	Clubb Racing Inc.	Ford	Drop the Hammer Auctions
06	Brayton Laster (R)	Wayne Peterson Racing	Ford	PeerlessPump.com / Big Fish BBQ
6	Lavar Scott	Rev Racing	Chevrolet	Max Siegel Inc.
9	Matt Kemp	Fast Track Racing	Toyota	I Love/Hate Everything Card Game
10	Tony Cosentino	Fast Track Racing	Toyota	Freedom Pool Service
11	Morgen Baird	Fast Track Racing	Ford	Founders Brewing Company
12	Mike Basham	Fast Track Racing	Ford	Double "H" Ranch
18	Gio Ruggiero	Joe Gibbs Racing	Toyota	First Auto Group
20	Lawless Alan	Venturini Motorsports	Toyota	AutoChargIt.com
23	Tyler Reif	Sigma Performance Services	Chevrolet	SPS / Vegas Fastener Manufacturing
25	Corey Heim	Venturini Motorsports	Toyota	Phoenix Construction
28	Brenden Queen (R)	Pinnacle Racing Group	Chevrolet	BestRepair.net
31	Derek White	Rise Motorsports	Toyota	First Peoples Energy
46	Thad Moffitt	Nitro Motorsports	Toyota	Induction Innovations
48	Brad Smith	Brad Smith Motorsports	Ford	Gary's Speed Shop
55	Isabella Robusto (R)	Venturini Motorsports	Toyota	Yahoo
65	Jeffery MacZink	MacZink Racing	Toyota	Parkway Services / Syncon
67	Ryan Roulette	Maples Motorsports	Ford	VFW / Save22.vet
68	Regina Sirvent	Kimmel Racing	Ford	Por Amor A Puebla
73	Andy Jankowiak	KLAS Motorsports	Toyota	Dak's Market / Whelen
76	Kole Raz	AM Racing	Ford	Cyclum Nextgen Travel Centers
86	Jeff Maconi	Clubb Racing Inc.	Ford	Maconi Setup Shop / Yavapai Bottle Gas
93	Caleb Costner	CW Motorsports	Chevrolet	Fischer Insurance / Auto-Owners Insurance
97	Jason Kitzmiller	CR7 Motorsports	Chevrolet	A.L.L. Construction / Carter Cat
99	Michael Maples	Maples Motorsports	Chevrolet	Don Ray Petroleum / Maples Motorsports
Official entry list

== Practice ==
The first and only practice session was held on Friday, June 6, at 2:00 PM ET, and would last for 50 minutes. Brenden Queen, driving for Pinnacle Racing Group, would set the fastest time in the session, with a lap of 38.960, and a speed of 184.805 mph (297.415 km/h).

Pos.	#	Driver	Team	Make	Time	Speed
1	28	Brenden Queen (R)	Pinnacle Racing Group	Chevrolet	38.960	184.805
2	20	Lawless Alan	Venturini Motorsports	Toyota	39.258	183.402
3	6	Lavar Scott	Rev Racing	Chevrolet	39.363	182.913
Full practice results

== Qualifying ==
Qualifying was held on Friday, June 6, at 3:05 PM EST. The qualifying system used is a multi-car, multi-lap based system. All drivers will be on track for a 20-minute timed session, and whoever sets the fastest time in that session will win the pole.

Brenden Queen, driving for Pinnacle Racing Group, would score the pole for the race, with a lap of 38.841, and a speed of 185.371 mph (298.326 km/h).

=== Qualifying results ===
Pos.	#	Driver	Team	Make	Time	Speed
1	28	Brenden Queen (R)	Pinnacle Racing Group	Chevrolet	38.841	185.371
2	55	Isabella Robusto (R)	Venturini Motorsports	Toyota	38.874	185.214
3	25	Corey Heim	Venturini Motorsports	Toyota	38.914	185.023
4	46	Thad Moffitt	Nitro Motorsports	Toyota	39.090	184.190
5	18	Gio Ruggiero	Joe Gibbs Racing	Toyota	39.114	184.077
6	76	Kole Raz	AM Racing	Ford	39.219	183.584
7	20	Lawless Alan	Venturini Motorsports	Toyota	39.238	183.496
8	73	Andy Jankowiak	KLAS Motorsports	Toyota	39.276	183.318
9	6	Lavar Scott	Rev Racing	Chevrolet	39.326	183.085
10	97	Jason Kitzmiller	CR7 Motorsports	Chevrolet	39.717	181.283
11	23	Tyler Reif	Sigma Performance Services	Chevrolet	39.776	181.014
12	2	Eloy Sebastián	Rev Racing	Chevrolet	39.800	180.905
13	68	Regina Sirvent	Kimmel Racing	Ford	39.993	180.032
14	11	Morgen Baird	Fast Track Racing	Ford	41.225	174.651
15	10	Tony Cosentino	Fast Track Racing	Toyota	41.453	173.691
16	65	Jeffery MacZink	MacZink Racing	Toyota	41.570	173.202
17	99	Michael Maples	Maples Motorsports	Chevrolet	41.857	172.014
18	93	Caleb Costner	CW Motorsports	Chevrolet	42.104	171.005
19	9	Matt Kemp	Fast Track Racing	Toyota	42.229	170.499
20	67	Ryan Roulette	Maples Motorsports	Ford	42.734	168.484
21	12	Mike Basham	Fast Track Racing	Ford	46.108	156.155
22	06	Brayton Laster (R)	Wayne Peterson Racing	Ford	46.141	156.043
23	03	Alex Clubb	Clubb Racing Inc.	Ford	47.434	151.790
24	86	Jeff Maconi	Clubb Racing Inc.	Ford	48.848	147.396
25	48	Brad Smith	Brad Smith Motorsports	Ford	50.206	143.409
26	31	Derek White	Rise Motorsports	Toyota	–	–
27	0	Nate Moeller	Wayne Peterson Racing	Toyota	–	–
Official qualifying results

== Race results ==
Fin	St	#	Driver	Team	Make	Laps	Led	Status	Pts
1	1	28	Brenden Queen (R)	Pinnacle Racing Group	Chevrolet	100	65	Running	49
2	3	25	Corey Heim	Venturini Motorsports	Toyota	100	0	Running	42
3	7	20	Lawless Alan	Venturini Motorsports	Toyota	100	0	Running	41
4	5	18	Gio Ruggiero	Joe Gibbs Racing	Toyota	100	35	Running	41
5	9	6	Lavar Scott	Rev Racing	Chevrolet	100	0	Running	39
6	4	46	Thad Moffitt	Nitro Motorsports	Toyota	100	0	Running	38
7	11	23	Tyler Reif	Sigma Performance Services	Chevrolet	100	0	Running	37
8	10	97	Jason Kitzmiller	CR7 Motorsports	Chevrolet	100	0	Running	36
9	2	55	Isabella Robusto (R)	Venturini Motorsports	Toyota	100	0	Running	35
10	12	2	Eloy Sebastián	Rev Racing	Chevrolet	99	0	Running	34
11	18	93	Caleb Costner	CW Motorsports	Chevrolet	96	0	Running	33
12	20	67	Ryan Roulette	Maples Motorsports	Ford	96	0	Running	32
13	14	11	Morgen Baird	Fast Track Racing	Ford	96	0	Running	31
14	13	68	Regina Sirvent	Kimmel Racing	Ford	95	0	Running	30
15	17	99	Michael Maples	Maples Motorsports	Chevrolet	93	0	Running	29
16	8	73	Andy Jankowiak	KLAS Motorsports	Toyota	93	0	Running	28
17	26	31	Derek White	Rise Motorsports	Toyota	86	0	Running	27
18	6	76	Kole Raz	AM Racing	Ford	86	0	Running	26
19	22	06	Brayton Laster (R)	Wayne Peterson Racing	Ford	70	0	Running	25
20	23	03	Alex Clubb	Clubb Racing Inc.	Ford	29	0	Brake Line	24
21	25	48	Brad Smith	Brad Smith Motorsports	Ford	19	0	Too Slow	23
22	15	10	Tony Cosentino	Fast Track Racing	Toyota	10	0	Quit	22
23	21	12	Mike Basham	Fast Track Racing	Ford	8	0	Quit	21
24	16	65	Jeffery MacZink	MacZink Racing	Toyota	5	0	Engine	20
25	19	9	Matt Kemp	Fast Track Racing	Toyota	5	0	Quit	19
26	24	86	Jeff Maconi	Clubb Racing Inc.	Ford	1	0	Quit	18
27	27	0	Nate Moeller	Wayne Peterson Racing	Toyota	0	0	DNS	17
Official race results

== Standings after the race ==
Drivers' Championship standings

	Pos	Driver	Points
1	1	Brenden Queen	287
1	2	Lavar Scott	281 (–6)
	3	Lawless Alan	279 (–8)
	4	Andy Jankowiak	262 (–25)
	5	Jason Kitzmiller	233 (–54)
	6	Thad Moffitt	227 (–60)
2	7	Isabella Robusto	195 (–92)
1	8	Alex Clubb	193 (–94)
1	9	Michael Maples	187 (–100)
1	10	Brayton Laster	180 (–107)

- Note: Only the first 10 positions are included for the driver standings.

Previous race: 2025 General Tire 150 (Charlotte)	ARCA Menards Series; 2025 season	Next race: 2025 Berlin ARCA 200
