= 2025 ARCA Menards Series East =

39th season of the ARCA Menards Series East

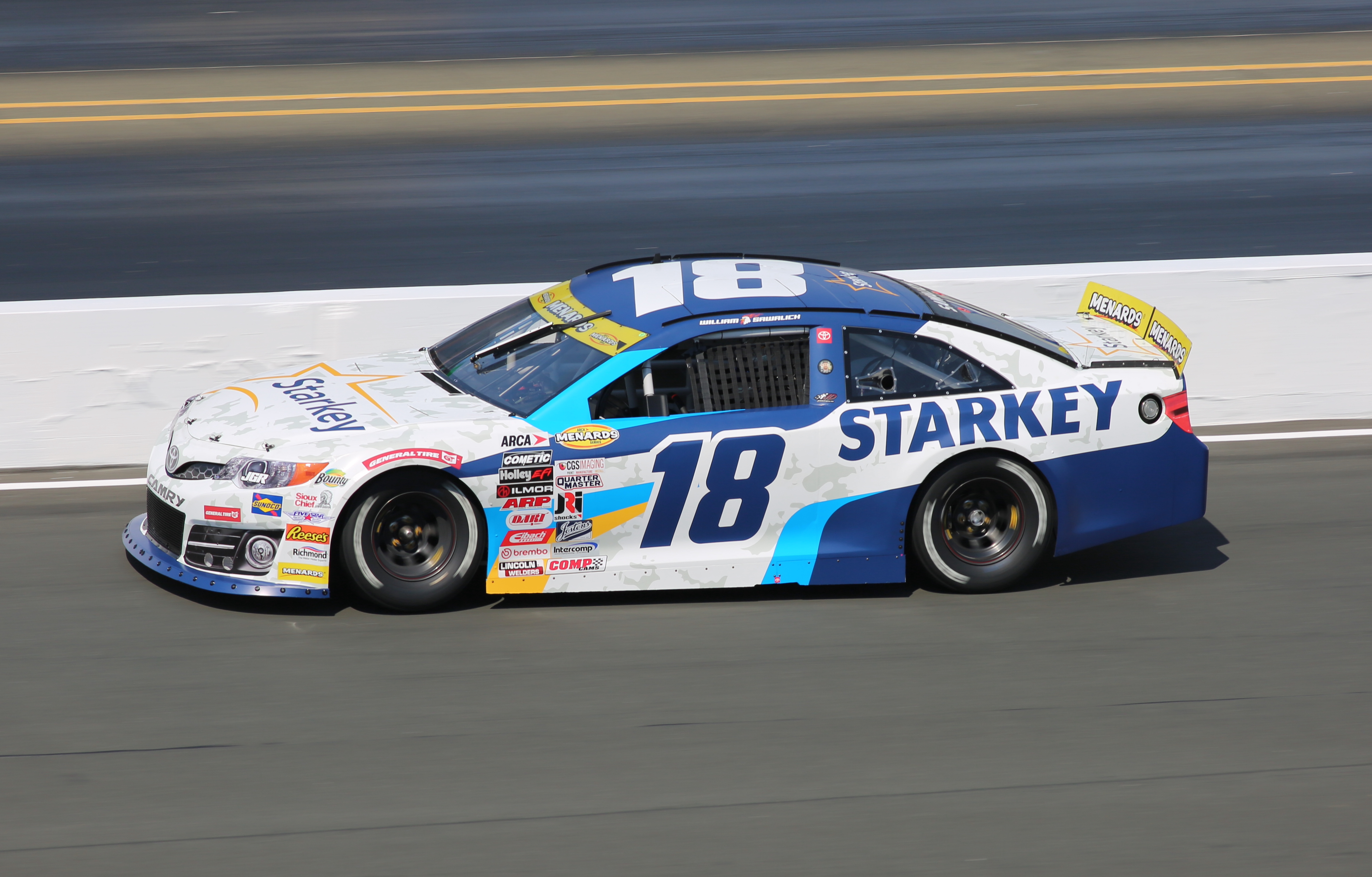
The Joe Gibbs Racing No. 18 car won the owners' championship. Isaac Kitzmiller (not pictured) won the drivers' championship.

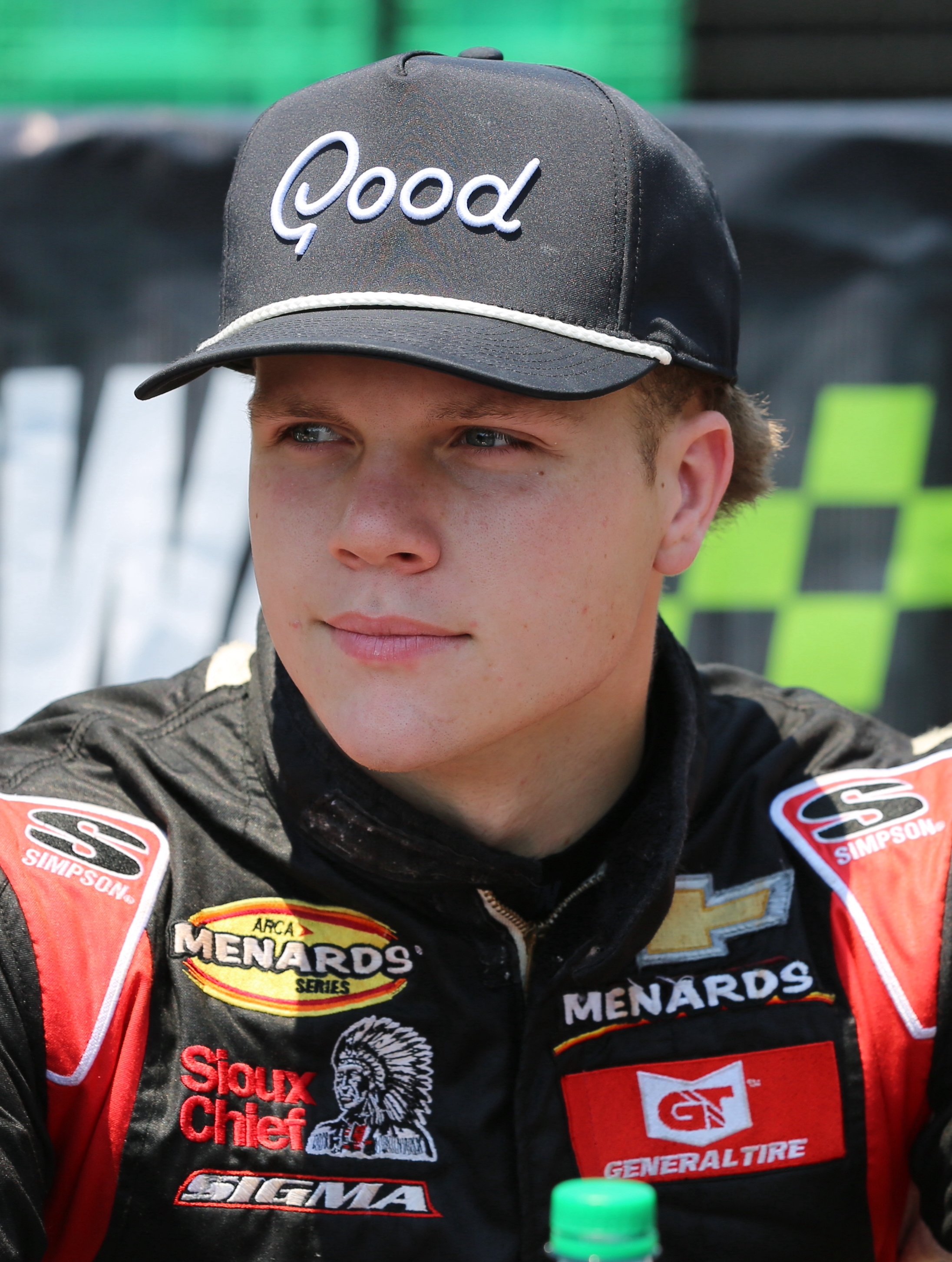
Tyler Reif finished second in the drivers' championship

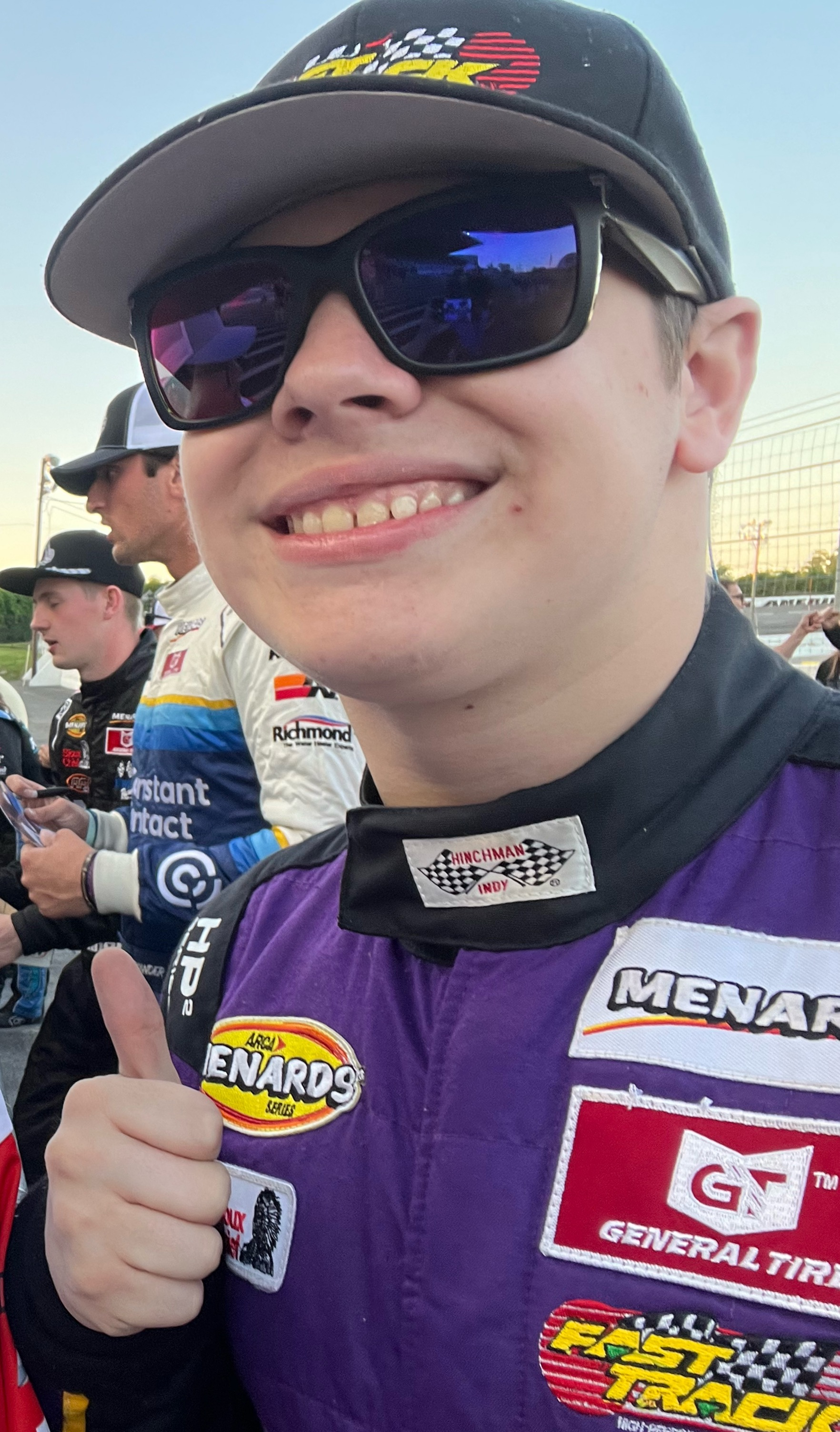
Zachary Tinkle finished third in the drivers' championship

The 2025 ARCA Menards Series East was the 39th season of the ARCA Menards Series East, a regional stock car racing series sanctioned by NASCAR in the United States. The season began on March 22 with the Pensacola 150 at Five Flags Speedway and ended on September 11 with the Bush's Beans 200 at Bristol Motor Speedway.

2023 and 2024 champion William Sawalich did not return to the East Series full-time in 2025 and go for a three peat as he moved up to the NASCAR Xfinity Series full-time.

At the conclusion of the season, Isaac Kitzmiller of ACR Motorsports won the championship.

== Teams and drivers ==
Note: If a driver is listed as their own crew chief for a particular race, that means that their entry in that race was a start and park.

=== Complete schedule ===
Manufacturer	Team	No.	Driver	Crew chief	Ref
Chevrolet	ACR Motorsports (Note: Entries are fielded in a collaboration with CR7 Motorsports.)	79	Isaac Kitzmiller (R)	Frank Kimmel 1 Doug Howe 7	
Chevrolet	Sigma Performance Services	23	Tyler Reif (R)	Tom Ackerman	
Ford	Brad Smith Motorsports	48	Brad Smith	Carlos Leon 1 Terry Strange 2 Carl Brown 1 Jeff Smith 3 Gary Sevanans 1	
Toyota	Fast Track Racing	11	Zachary Tinkle	Chris Vanscoy	
Toyota	Fast Track Racing	12	Takuma Koga (R)	Dick Doheny	
Toyota	Joe Gibbs Racing	18	Max Reaves 3	Matt Ross	
Toyota	Joe Gibbs Racing	18	William Sawalich 1	Matt Ross	
Toyota	Joe Gibbs Racing	18	Brent Crews 4	Matt Ross	
Toyota	Rise Motorsports	31	Rita Goulet 2	Matthew Wright 3 Tony Ponkauskas 1 Nik Smith 1 Tim Goulet 3	
Toyota	Rise Motorsports	31	Tim Goulet 1	Matthew Wright 3 Tony Ponkauskas 1 Nik Smith 1 Tim Goulet 3	
Toyota	Rise Motorsports	31	Quinn Davis 3	Matthew Wright 3 Tony Ponkauskas 1 Nik Smith 1 Tim Goulet 3	
Toyota	Rise Motorsports	31	Rick Goodale 1	Matthew Wright 3 Tony Ponkauskas 1 Nik Smith 1 Tim Goulet 3	
Toyota	Rise Motorsports	31	Bobby Dale Earnhardt 1	Matthew Wright 3 Tony Ponkauskas 1 Nik Smith 1 Tim Goulet 3	
Ford 3 Chevrolet 1 Toyota 4	Fast Track Racing 6 Wayne Peterson Racing 1 (Note: It was a Wayne Peterson Racing entry using Fast Track Racing's owner points.); Brad Smith Motorsports 1 (Note: It was a Brad Smith Motorsports entry using Fast Track Racing's owner points.)	01	E. J. Tamayo 1	Ethan Hutchins 1 Nathan Davis 1 Rodney Harris 1 Jayson Reynolds 1 Joseth Carabantes 3 Trevor Ward 1	
Ford 3 Chevrolet 1 Toyota 4	Fast Track Racing 6 Wayne Peterson Racing 1 Brad Smith Motorsports 1	01	Tim Monroe 1	Ethan Hutchins 1 Nathan Davis 1 Rodney Harris 1 Jayson Reynolds 1 Joseth Carabantes 3 Trevor Ward 1	
Ford 3 Chevrolet 1 Toyota 4	Fast Track Racing 6 Wayne Peterson Racing 1 Brad Smith Motorsports 1	01	Rita Goulet 1	Ethan Hutchins 1 Nathan Davis 1 Rodney Harris 1 Jayson Reynolds 1 Joseth Carabantes 3 Trevor Ward 1	
Ford 3 Chevrolet 1 Toyota 4	Fast Track Racing 6 Wayne Peterson Racing 1 Brad Smith Motorsports 1	01	Jeff Smith 1	Ethan Hutchins 1 Nathan Davis 1 Rodney Harris 1 Jayson Reynolds 1 Joseth Carabantes 3 Trevor Ward 1	
Ford 3 Chevrolet 1 Toyota 4	Fast Track Racing 6 Wayne Peterson Racing 1 Brad Smith Motorsports 1	01	Matt Kemp 2	Ethan Hutchins 1 Nathan Davis 1 Rodney Harris 1 Jayson Reynolds 1 Joseth Carabantes 3 Trevor Ward 1	
Ford 3 Chevrolet 1 Toyota 4	Fast Track Racing 6 Wayne Peterson Racing 1 Brad Smith Motorsports 1	01	Trevor Ward 1	Ethan Hutchins 1 Nathan Davis 1 Rodney Harris 1 Jayson Reynolds 1 Joseth Carabantes 3 Trevor Ward 1	
Ford 3 Chevrolet 1 Toyota 4	Fast Track Racing 6 Wayne Peterson Racing 1 Brad Smith Motorsports 1	01	Mike Basham 1	Ethan Hutchins 1 Nathan Davis 1 Rodney Harris 1 Jayson Reynolds 1 Joseth Carabantes 3 Trevor Ward 1	
Toyota 6 Ford 1 Chevrolet 1	Fast Track Racing 7 Rev Racing 1 (Note: It was a Rev Racing entry using Fast Track Racing's owner points.)	9	Cody Dennison 2	Mike Sroufe 3 Mike Basham 1 Joseth Carabantes 1 Andrew Kierman 1 Derek Peebles 1	
Toyota 6 Ford 1 Chevrolet 1	Fast Track Racing 7 Rev Racing 1	9	Blaine Donahue 2	Mike Sroufe 3 Mike Basham 1 Joseth Carabantes 1 Andrew Kierman 1 Derek Peebles 1	
Toyota 6 Ford 1 Chevrolet 1	Fast Track Racing 7 Rev Racing 1	9	Mike Basham 2	Mike Sroufe 3 Mike Basham 1 Joseth Carabantes 1 Andrew Kierman 1 Derek Peebles 1	
Toyota 6 Ford 1 Chevrolet 1	Fast Track Racing 7 Rev Racing 1	9	Trevor Ward 1	Mike Sroufe 3 Mike Basham 1 Joseth Carabantes 1 Andrew Kierman 1 Derek Peebles 1	
Toyota 6 Ford 1 Chevrolet 1	Fast Track Racing 7 Rev Racing 1	9	Logan Misuraca 1	Mike Sroufe 3 Mike Basham 1 Joseth Carabantes 1 Andrew Kierman 1 Derek Peebles 1	
Ford 6 Chevrolet 1 Toyota 1	Fast Track Racing 7 Rev Racing 1	10	Mike Basham 1	Joseth Carabantes 1 Derek Peebles 1 Riley Higgins 1 Mike Sroufe 2 Andrew Kierman 2	
Ford 6 Chevrolet 1 Toyota 1	Fast Track Racing 7 Rev Racing 1	10	Eloy Falcón 1	Joseth Carabantes 1 Derek Peebles 1 Riley Higgins 1 Mike Sroufe 2 Andrew Kierman 2	
Ford 6 Chevrolet 1 Toyota 1	Fast Track Racing 7 Rev Racing 1	10	D. L. Wilson 1	Joseth Carabantes 1 Derek Peebles 1 Riley Higgins 1 Mike Sroufe 2 Andrew Kierman 2	
Ford 6 Chevrolet 1 Toyota 1	Fast Track Racing 7 Rev Racing 1	10	Matt Kemp 1	Joseth Carabantes 1 Derek Peebles 1 Riley Higgins 1 Mike Sroufe 2 Andrew Kierman 2	
Ford 6 Chevrolet 1 Toyota 1	Fast Track Racing 7 Rev Racing 1	10	Tony Cosentino 4	Joseth Carabantes 1 Derek Peebles 1 Riley Higgins 1 Mike Sroufe 2 Andrew Kierman 2	
Toyota 7 Ford 1	Wayne Peterson Racing	06	Nate Moeller 4	Nate Moeller 6 Wayne Peterson 1 Michael Peterson 1	
Toyota 7 Ford 1	Wayne Peterson Racing	06	Brayton Laster 4	Nate Moeller 6 Wayne Peterson 1 Michael Peterson 1	

=== Limited schedule ===
Manufacturer	Team	No.	Driver	Crew chief	Races	Ref
Chevrolet	Andrew Patterson Racing	40	Andrew Patterson	Tony Ponkauskas 2 Austin Simmons 3	5	
Chevrolet	CCM Racing	7	Kadence Davenport	Andy Jirik	2	
Chevrolet	CR7 Motorsports	97	Jason Kitzmiller	Frank Kimmel	4	
Chevrolet	Finney Racing Enterprises (Note: At IRP, it was a Finney Racing Enterprises entry using Kimmel Racing's owner points.)	80	Brian Finney	Wally Finney	1	
Chevrolet	Finney Racing Enterprises	69	Brian Finney	Wally Finney	1	
Chevrolet	Hettinger Racing	4	Carson Brown	Bruce Cook	1	
Chevrolet	Maples Motorsports	99	Michael Maples	Kyle Totman 1 Jeremy Petty 3	4	
Chevrolet	Pinnacle Racing Group	28	Connor Mosack	Steven Dawson	1	
Chevrolet	Pinnacle Racing Group	28	Austin Green	Steven Dawson	1	
Chevrolet	Pinnacle Racing Group	28	Brenden Queen	Steven Dawson	4	
Chevrolet	Pinnacle Racing Group	82	Connor Mosack	Shane Huffman	1	
Chevrolet	Pinnacle Racing Group	82	Tristan McKee	Shane Huffman	1	
Chevrolet	Rev Racing	2	Lanie Buice	Matt Bucher 3 Derek Peebles 1	3	
Chevrolet	Rev Racing	2	Eloy Falcón	Matt Bucher 3 Derek Peebles 1	1	
Chevrolet	Rev Racing	6	Lavar Scott	Glenn Parker	5	
Chevrolet	Rick Ware Racing	51	Carson Ware	Jeff Spraker	1	
Chevrolet	Sigma Performance Services	24	Spencer Gallagher	Chris Bray	1	
Chevrolet	Spraker Racing Enterprises	63	Spencer Davis	Jeff Spraker	1	
Ford	AM Racing	76	Kole Raz	Ryan London	3	
Ford	City Garage Motorsports	5	Michael Clayton	Nathan Guerrero	1	
Ford	City Garage Motorsports	85	Becca Monopoli	Tom Monopoli	3	
Ford	Clubb Racing Inc.	03	Alex Clubb	Brian Clubb	3	
Ford	Clubb Racing Inc.	03	Josh White	Brian Clubb	1	
Ford	Clubb Racing Inc.	86	A. J. Moyer	Brian Clubb 3 Joe Phelps 1 Shane Whitfield 2 Tony Blowers 1	1	
Ford	Clubb Racing Inc.	86	Jeff Maconi	Brian Clubb 3 Joe Phelps 1 Shane Whitfield 2 Tony Blowers 1	1	
Ford	Clubb Racing Inc.	86	Alex Malycke	Brian Clubb 3 Joe Phelps 1 Shane Whitfield 2 Tony Blowers 1	1	
Ford	Clubb Racing Inc.	86	Corey Aiken	Brian Clubb 3 Joe Phelps 1 Shane Whitfield 2 Tony Blowers 1	1	
Ford	Clubb Racing Inc.	86	Doug Miller	Brian Clubb 3 Joe Phelps 1 Shane Whitfield 2 Tony Blowers 1	1	
Ford	Clubb Racing Inc.	86	Colby Evans	Brian Clubb 3 Joe Phelps 1 Shane Whitfield 2 Tony Blowers 1	1	
Ford	Clubb Racing Inc.	86	Alex Clubb	Brian Clubb 3 Joe Phelps 1 Shane Whitfield 2 Tony Blowers 1	1	
Ford	CW Motorsports	93	London McKenzie (R)	Darrel Krentz	2	
Ford	Kimmel Racing	68	Regina Sirvent	Will Kimmel	2	
Ford	Rette Jones Racing	30	Garrett Mitchell	Mark Rette	1	
Toyota	CW Motorsports	39	D. L. Wilson	Riley Higgins 1 Cameron Harrison 1	1	
Toyota	CW Motorsports	39	Caleb Costner	Riley Higgins 1 Cameron Harrison 1	1	
Toyota	Hill Motorsports	56	Timmy Hill	Terry Elmore	4	
Toyota	Joe Gibbs Racing	81	Brent Crews	Justin Langdon	1	
Toyota	KLAS Motorsports	73	Andy Jankowiak	Mike Dayton	2	
Toyota	MacZink Racing	65	Jeffery MacZink	Jarod MacZink	1	
Toyota	MAN Motorsports	95	Hunter Wright	David Noble 3 Todd Parrott 1	3	
Toyota	MAN Motorsports	95	Jackson McLerran	David Noble 3 Todd Parrott 1	2	
Toyota	MAN Motorsports	96	Jackson McLerran	Mark Noble 1 Todd Parrott 2	3	
Toyota	Nitro Motorsports	46	Thad Moffitt	Jim Long	1	
Toyota	Nitro Motorsports	70	Camden Murphy	Jamie Jones 1 Shannon Rursch 3	1	
Toyota	Nitro Motorsports	70	Sam Corry	Jamie Jones 1 Shannon Rursch 3	2	
Toyota	Nitro Motorsports	70	Thomas Annunziata	Jamie Jones 1 Shannon Rursch 3	1	
Toyota	Richmond Motorsports	27	Tim Richmond	Adam Murphy	1	
Toyota	Shearer Speed Racing	98	Mike Basham	Vincenzo Valentin	1	
Toyota	Venturini Motorsports	15	Kris Wright	Larry Balsitis 1 Billy Venturini 1	1	
Toyota	Venturini Motorsports	15	Jake Finch	Larry Balsitis 1 Billy Venturini 1	1	
Toyota	Venturini Motorsports	20	Jake Finch	Shannon Rursch 1 Kevin Reed Jr. 4	1	
Toyota	Venturini Motorsports	20	Lawless Alan	Shannon Rursch 1 Kevin Reed Jr. 4	3	
Toyota	Venturini Motorsports	20	Leland Honeyman	Shannon Rursch 1 Kevin Reed Jr. 4	1	
Toyota	Venturini Motorsports	25	Patrick Staropoli	Jamie Jones 3 Shannon Rursch 1 Larry Balsitis 1	2	
Toyota	Venturini Motorsports	25	Jake Finch	Jamie Jones 3 Shannon Rursch 1 Larry Balsitis 1	1	
Toyota	Venturini Motorsports	25	Mason Mitchell	Jamie Jones 3 Shannon Rursch 1 Larry Balsitis 1	2	
Toyota	Venturini Motorsports	55	Isabella Robusto	Danny Jonhson	4	
Toyota	VWV Racing	00	Corey Aiken	John Kennedy 1 Larry Wilcox 1	2	
Toyota	Wayne Peterson Racing	0	Con Nicolopoulos	Michael Peterson	1	
Ford 2 Chevrolet 2	Maples Motorsports 3 VWV Racing 1 (Note: It was a VWV Racing entry using Maples Motorsports' owner points.)	67	Ryan Roulette	Jeremy Petty 1 Kyle Totman 3	1	
Ford 2 Chevrolet 2	Maples Motorsports 3 VWV Racing 1	67	Presley Sorah	Jeremy Petty 1 Kyle Totman 3	1	
Ford 2 Chevrolet 2	Maples Motorsports 3 VWV Racing 1	67	Austin Vaughn (R) (Note: Vaughn ran the full season split between the VWV Racing No. 34, Maples Motorsports No. 67 and VWV Racing No. 67 (which was a VWV entry fielding Maples' owner points) cars.)	Jeremy Petty 1 Kyle Totman 3	2	
Ford 6 Toyota 1	VWV Racing	34	Austin Vaughn (R)	Brad Elter 6 Tyler Beard 1	6	
Ford 6 Toyota 1	VWV Racing	34	Corey Aiken	Brad Elter 6 Tyler Beard 1	1	

== Schedule ==
The full schedule was announced on December 6, 2024. Some race dates were announced before then as part of the announcement of the main ARCA Series schedule on September 27.

Note: Races highlighted in gold are combination events with the ARCA Menards Series.

No	Race title	Track	Location	Date
1	Pensacola 150	Five Flags Speedway	Pensacola, Florida	March 22
2	Rockingham ARCA 125	Rockingham Speedway	Rockingham, North Carolina	April 18
3	Music City 150	Nashville Fairgrounds Speedway	Nashville, Tennessee	May 4 (Note: ARCA postponed the race at Nashville from May 3 to May 4 due to inclement weather.)
4	Dutch Boy 150	Flat Rock Speedway	Ash Township, Michigan	May 17
5	General Tire 150	Dover Motor Speedway	Dover, Delaware	July 18
6	LiUNA! 150	Lucas Oil Indianapolis Raceway Park	Brownsburg, Indiana	July 25
7	Atlas 150	Iowa Speedway	Newton, Iowa	August 1
8	Bush's Beans 200	Bristol Motor Speedway	Bristol, Tennessee	September 11

=== Schedule changes ===
- Milwaukee Mile did not return.
- Rockingham Speedway returned to the schedule.

== Results and standings ==
=== Race results ===
No.	Race	Pole position	Most laps led	Winning driver	Manufacturer	No.	Winning team	Report
1	Pensacola 150	Max Reaves	Max Reaves	Max Reaves	Toyota	18	Joe Gibbs Racing	Report
2	Rockingham ARCA 125	Brent Crews	Brent Crews	Brent Crews	Toyota	81	Joe Gibbs Racing	Report
3	Music City 150	Max Reaves	Max Reaves	Max Reaves	Toyota	18	Joe Gibbs Racing	Report
4	Dutch Boy 150	Max Reaves	Max Reaves	Max Reaves	Toyota	18	Joe Gibbs Racing	Report
5	General Tire 150	Brenden Queen	Brenden Queen	Brenden Queen	Chevrolet	28	Pinnacle Racing Group	Report
6	LiUNA! 150 presented by Dutch Boy	Brenden Queen	Brenden Queen	Brent Crews	Toyota	18	Joe Gibbs Racing	Report
7	Atlas 150	Brent Crews	Brenden Queen	Brenden Queen	Chevrolet	28	Pinnacle Racing Group	Report
8	Bush's Beans 200	Brent Crews	Brent Crews	Brent Crews	Toyota	18	Joe Gibbs Racing	Report

=== Drivers' championship ===
Notes:

- The pole winner also receives one bonus point, similar to the previous ARCA points system used until 2019 and unlike NASCAR.
- Additionally, after groups of five races of the season, drivers that compete in all five races receive fifty additional points. This points bonus will be given after the race at Dover.
  - Isaac Kitzmiller, Tyler Reif, Zachary Tinkle, Takuma Koga, Austin Vaughn, and Brad Smith received this points bonus for having competed in the first five races of the season (Five Flags, Rockingham, Nashville Fairgrounds, Flat Rock, and Dover).

(key) Bold – Pole position awarded by time. Italics – Pole position set by final practice results or rainout. * – Most laps led.

Pos	Driver	FIF	ROC	NSH	FRS	DOV	IRP	IOW	BRI	Points
1	Isaac Kitzmiller **(R)**	5	6	4	7	4	7	6	8	405
2	Tyler Reif **(R)**	3	17	2	2	5	14	11	6	388
3	Zachary Tinkle	10	11	5	6	9	16	12	31	352
4	Austin Vaughn **(R)**	15	13	14	5	14	31	18	23	320
5	Takuma Koga **(R)**	11	15	7	3	15	30	22	33	315
6	Brad Smith	21	24	11	8	20	26	27	22	293
7	Brent Crews		**1***			21	1	**2**	**1****	262
8	Brenden Queen					**1****	3*	1*	3	231
9	Lavar Scott		9			11	5	5	11	229
10	Jason Kitzmiller					8	8	10	9	191
11	Isabella Robusto					3	4	4	27	188
12	Tony Cosentino					22	21	14	18	151
13	Michael Maples					13	29	16	20	148
14	Max Reaves	**1***		1*	**1***					146
15	Andrew Patterson	22	18			10	12		13	145
16	Alex Clubb					18	22	20	21	145
17	Brayton Laster					16	25	21	29	135
18	Timmy Hill	7	20			6			19	124
19	Nate Moeller	16	23	10	11					116
20	Lawless Alan					12	2	3	Wth	116
21	Jackson McLerran	Wth		6	9		20		26	115
22	Hunter Wright	9		3			9			111
23	Mike Basham	13		15			24	25	34	109
24	Lanie Buice		8				11		12	101
25	Jake Finch		26			7			7	92
26	Quinn Davis			9			19	15		89
27	Corey Aiken	20	25			19			28	85
28	Rita Goulet	19		16	12					85
29	Connor Mosack	4					6			79
30	Eloy Falcón		3					8		77
31	Becca Monopoli	14		8			34			76
32	Kole Raz	2	7	Wth						74
33	Patrick Staropoli		4						10	74
34	Matt Kemp				4	24	32			72
35	Andy Jankowiak		5						14	69
36	Sam Corry						13	7		68
37	Mason Mitchell						15	9		64
38	D. L. Wilson	12		13						63
39	Regina Sirvent						17	13		58
40	London McKenzie **(R)**	8	27							53
41	Tim Richmond							19	16	53
42	Cody Dennison	17					18			53
43	Blaine Donahue		16			23				49
44	Kadence Davenport						23	17		48
45	Trevor Ward				14			26		48
46	William Sawalich		2							43
47	Tristan McKee								2	42
48	Camden Murphy					2				42
49	Leland Honeyman								4	40
50	Thomas Annunziata								5	39
51	Carson Brown	6								38
52	Thad Moffitt						10			34
53	Alex Malycke				10					34
54	Spencer Gallagher		10							34
55	Jeff Maconi			12						32
56	Austin Green		12							32
57	Jeffery MacZink				13					31
58	Tim Monroe		14							30
59	Carson Ware								15	29
60	Jeff Smith				15					29
61	Garrett Mitchell								17	27
62	Ryan Roulette					17				27
63	E. J. Tamayo	18								26
64	Tim Goulet		19							25
65	A. J. Moyer		21							23
66	Caleb Costner		22							22
67	Colby Evans							23		21
68	Con Nicolopoulos								24	20
69	Kris Wright							24		20
70	Logan Misuraca								25	19
71	Brian Finney			Wth			27			17
72	Presley Sorah						28			16
73	Bobby Dale Earnhardt								30	14
74	Josh White								32	12
75	Doug Miller						33			11
	Michael Clayton						DNQ			
	C. W. Lemoine	Wth								
	Spencer Davis		Wth							
	Rick Goodale					Wth				

== See also ==
- 2025 NASCAR Cup Series
- 2025 NASCAR Xfinity Series
- 2025 NASCAR Craftsman Truck Series
- 2025 ARCA Menards Series
- 2025 ARCA Menards Series West
- 2025 NASCAR Whelen Modified Tour
- 2025 NASCAR Canada Series
- 2025 NASCAR Mexico Series
- 2025 NASCAR Euro Series
- 2025 NASCAR Brasil Series
- 2025 CARS Tour
- 2025 SMART Modified Tour
- 2025 ASA STARS National Tour
