= Lanie Buice =

American racing driver (born 2006)

- Born: Lanie Nicole Buice; November 3, 2006 (age 20); Jackson, Georgia, U.S.

ARCA Menards Series career
- 9 races run over 2 years
- Best finish: 23rd (2026)
- First race: 2025 Tide 150 (Kansas)
- Last race: 2026 Menards 150 (Kansas)
Wins	Top tens	Poles
0	7	1

ARCA Menards Series East career
- 3 races run over 1 year
- Best finish: 24th (2025)
- First race: 2025 Rockingham ARCA 125 (Rockingham)
- Last race: 2025 Bush's Beans 200 (Bristol)
Wins	Top tens	Poles
0	1	0
- Statistics up to date as of September 26, 2026.

Lanie Nicole Buice (born November 3rd, 2006) is an American professional stock car racing driver. She last competed part-time in the ARCA Menards Series, driving the No. 77 Chevrolet for Pinnacle Racing Group. She has previously competed in the ARCA Menards Series East.

== Racing career ==
Buice has competed in the NASCAR Advance Auto Parts Weekly Series.

In 2025, it was revealed that Buice would participate in the pre-season test for the ARCA Menards Series at Daytona International Speedway, driving the No. 2B Chevrolet for Rev Racing. On February 6, it was announced that Buice would drive part-time in 2025 for Rev along with Eloy Sebastián. Alongside this, she would run full-time for Lee Pullman Performance in the CARS Tour, where she finished 11th in the final points standings.

In 2026, Buice ran a partial schedule in the ARCA Menards Series, driving five races in the No. 77 Chevrolet for Pinnacle Racing Group. She finished in the top-five in every race she started, including a pole at Pocono and a second-place finish at Chicagoland.

== Motorsports career results ==
=== Stock car career summary ===
Season	Series	Team	Races	Wins	Top 5	Top 10	Points	Position
2023	CARS Late Model Stock Car Tour	N/A	5	0	0	1	83	29th
2024	CARS Pro Late Model Tour	Fab Specialists	2	0	0	0	0	N/A
2025	CARS Late Model Stock Car Tour	Lee Pulliam Performance	15	0	2	7	417	11th
2025	ARCA Menards Series East	Rev Racing	3	0	0	1	101	24th
2025	ARCA Menards Series	Rev Racing	4	0	0	2	135	33rd
2026	ARCA Menards Series	Pinnacle Racing Group	5	0	5	5	202	23rd

=== ARCA Menards Series ===
(key) (Bold – Pole position awarded by qualifying time. Italics – Pole position earned by points standings or practice time. * – Most laps led. ** – All laps led.)

ARCA Menards Series results
Year	Team	No.	Make	1	2	3	4	5	6	7	8	9	10	11	12	13	14	15	16	17	18	19	20	AMSC	Pts	Ref
2025	Rev Racing	2	Chevy	DAY	PHO	TAL	KAN; 8	CLT; 10	MCH	BLN	ELK	LRP	DOV	IRP; 11	IOW	GLN	ISF	MAD	DSF	BRI; 12	SLM	KAN	TOL	33rd	135	
2026	Pinnacle Racing Group	77	Chevy	DAY	PHO	KAN; 5	TAL	GLN	TOL	MCH; 5	**POC**; 5	BER	ELK	CHI; 2	LRP	IRP	IOW	ISF	MAD	DSF	SLM	BRI	KAN; 4	23rd	202	

==== ARCA Menards Series East ====
ARCA Menards Series East results
Year	Team	No.	Make	1	2	3	4	5	6	7	8	AMSEC	Pts	Ref
2025	Rev Racing	2	Chevy	FIF	CAR; 8	NSV	FRS	DOV	IRP; 11	IOW	BRI; 12	24th	101	

=== CARS Late Model Stock Car Tour ===
(key) (Bold – Pole position awarded by qualifying time. Italics – Pole position earned by points standings or practice time. * – Most laps led. ** – All laps led.)

CARS Late Model Stock Car Tour results
Year	Team	No.	Make	1	2	3	4	5	6	7	8	9	10	11	12	13	14	15	16	CLMSCTC	Pts	Ref
2023	N/A	21	Chevy	SNM	FLC; 19	HCY; 29	ACE	NWS	LGY	DOM	CRW; 11	HCY	ACE	TCM	WKS	AAS	SBO		CRW; 7	29th	83	
2023	N/A	21	Ford															TCM; 14		29th	83	
2025	Lee Pulliam Performance	03	Toyota	AAS; 10	WCS; 21	CDL; 20	OCS; 28	ACE; 4	NWS; 32	LGY; 23	DOM; 5	CRW; 18	HCY; 8	AND; 12	FLC; 13	SBO; 6	TCM; 10	NWS; 9		11th	417	

=== CARS Pro Late Model Tour ===
(key)

CARS Pro Late Model Tour results
Year	Team	No.	Make	1	2	3	4	5	6	7	8	9	10	11	12	13	CPLMTC	Pts	Ref
2024	Fab Specialists	24B	Chevy	SNM	HCY	OCS	ACE	TCM	CRW	HCY	NWS	ACE	FLC	SBO	TCM; 20	NWS; 20	N/A	0	
