= 2025 Atlas 150 =

2025 ARCA Menards Series and ARCA Menards Series East combination race

Race details
- Race 12 of 20 of the 2025 ARCA Menards Series; Race 7 of 8 of the 2025 ARCA Menards Series East
- Date: August 1, 2025
- Official name: 19th Annual Atlas 150
- Location: Iowa Speedway in Newton, Iowa
- Course: Permanent racing facility
- Course length: 0.875 miles (1.408 km)
- Distance: 150 laps, 131 mi (211 km)
- Scheduled distance: 150 laps, 131 mi (211 km)
- Average speed: 93.490 mph (150.458 km/h)

Pole position
Driver	Brent Crews	Joe Gibbs Racing
- Time: 22.901

Most laps led
Driver	Brenden Queen	Pinnacle Racing Group
- Laps: 112

Winner
No. 28	Brenden Queen	Pinnacle Racing Group

Television in the United States
- Network: FS1
- Announcers: Brent Stover, Phil Parsons, and Austin Dillon

Radio in the United States
- Radio: MRN

The 2025 Atlas 150 was the 12th stock car race of the 2025 ARCA Menards Series season, the 7th race of the 2025 ARCA Menards Series East season, and the 19th running of the event. The race was held on Friday, August 1, 2025, at Iowa Speedway in Newton, Iowa, a 0.875 mile (1.408 km) permanent asphalt tri-oval shaped speedway. The race took the scheduled 150 laps to complete. Brenden Queen, driving for Pinnacle Racing Group, would hold off a hard-charging Brent Crews in the final few laps to earn his fifth career ARCA Menards Series win, his second career ARCA Menards Series East win, and his fifth of the season. Queen also dominated the race, leading a race-high 112 laps. To fill out the podium, Lawless Alan, driving for Venturini Motorsports, would finish in 3rd, respectively.

== Report ==
=== Background ===
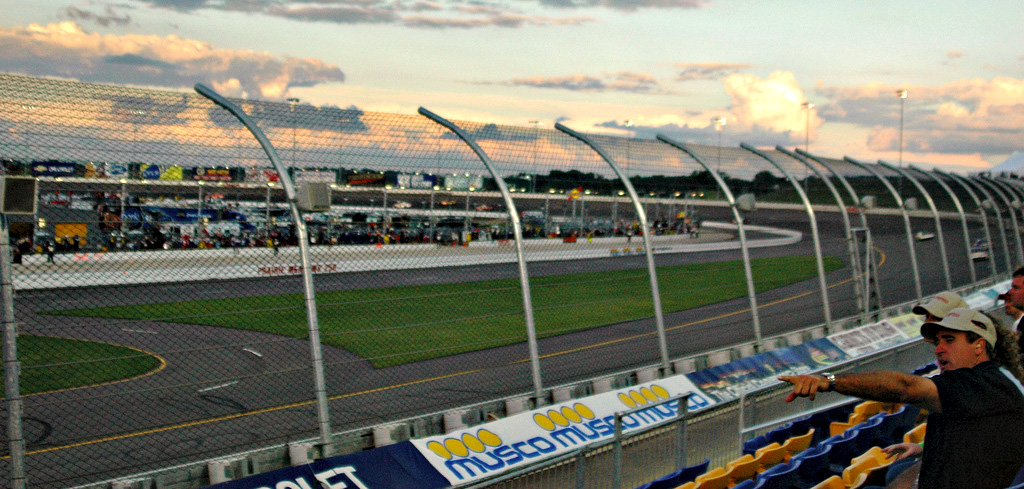
Iowa Speedway, the track where the race was held.

Iowa Speedway is a 7/8-mile (1.4 km) paved oval motor racing track in Newton, Iowa, United States, approximately 30 miles (48 km) east of Des Moines. The track was designed with influence from Rusty Wallace and patterned after Richmond Raceway, a short track where Wallace was very successful. It has over 25,000 permanent seats as well as a unique multi-tiered Recreational Vehicle viewing area along the backstretch. The track hosts the NTT IndyCar Series and NASCAR events.

After the 2020 race was canceled due to the pandemic, the race was removed from the 2021 schedule. In 2024, it was announced that the Xfinity Series would return to Iowa with a Cup Series race.

==== Entry list ====
- (R) denotes rookie driver.

#	Driver	Team	Make
01	Trevor Ward	Fast Track Racing	Toyota
2	Eloy Falcón	Rev Racing	Chevrolet
03	Alex Clubb	Clubb Racing Inc.	Ford
06	Brayton Laster (R)	Wayne Peterson Racing	Ford
6	Lavar Scott	Rev Racing	Chevrolet
7	Kadence Davenport	CCM Racing	Chevrolet
9	Mike Basham	Fast Track Racing	Toyota
10	Tony Cosentino	Fast Track Racing	Ford
11	Zachary Tinkle	Fast Track Racing	Toyota
12	Takuma Koga (R)	Fast Track Racing	Toyota
15	Kris Wright	Venturini Motorsports	Toyota
18	Brent Crews	Joe Gibbs Racing	Toyota
20	Lawless Alan	Venturini Motorsports	Toyota
23	Tyler Reif (R)	Sigma Performance Services	Chevrolet
25	Mason Mitchell	Venturini Motorsports	Toyota
27	Tim Richmond	Richmond Motorsports	Toyota
28	Brenden Queen (R)	Pinnacle Racing Group	Chevrolet
31	Quinn Davis	Rise Motorsports	Toyota
48	Brad Smith	Brad Smith Motorsports	Ford
55	Isabella Robusto (R)	Venturini Motorsports	Toyota
67	Austin Vaughn (R)	Maples Motorsports	Chevrolet
68	Regina Sirvent	Kimmel Racing	Ford
70	Sam Corry	Nitro Motorsports	Toyota
79	Isaac Kitzmiller (R)	ACR Motorsports	Chevrolet
86	Colby Evans	Clubb Racing Inc.	Ford
97	Jason Kitzmiller	CR7 Motorsports	Chevrolet
99	Michael Maples	Maples Motorsports	Chevrolet
Official entry list

== Practice ==
The first and only practice session was held on Friday, August 1, at 2:30 PM CST, and would last for 45 minutes. Brent Crews, driving for Joe Gibbs Racing, would set the fastest time in the session, with a lap of 23.042, and a speed of 136.707 mph (220.009 km/h).

Pos.	#	Driver	Team	Make	Time	Speed
1	18	Brent Crews	Joe Gibbs Racing	Toyota	23.042	136.707
2	28	Brenden Queen (R)	Pinnacle Racing Group	Chevrolet	23.279	135.315
3	20	Lawless Alan	Venturini Motorsports	Toyota	23.372	134.777
Full practice results

== Qualifying ==
Qualifying was held on Friday, August 1, at 3:30 PM CST. The qualifying procedure used is a multi-car, multi-lap based system. All drivers will be on track for a 20-minute timed session, and whoever sets the fastest time in that session will win the pole.

Brent Crews, driving for Joe Gibbs Racing, would score the pole for the race, with a lap of 22.901, and a speed of 137.549 mph (221.364 km/h).

=== Qualifying results ===
Pos.	#	Driver	Team	Make	Time	Speed
1	18	Brent Crews	Joe Gibbs Racing	Toyota	22.901	137.549
2	28	Brenden Queen (R)	Pinnacle Racing Group	Chevrolet	23.016	136.861
3	20	Lawless Alan	Venturini Motorsports	Toyota	23.305	135.164
4	6	Lavar Scott	Rev Racing	Chevrolet	23.510	133.986
5	70	Sam Corry	Nitro Motorsports	Toyota	23.584	133.565
6	55	Isabella Robusto (R)	Venturini Motorsports	Toyota	23.608	133.429
7	15	Kris Wright	Venturini Motorsports	Toyota	23.612	133.407
8	25	Mason Mitchell	Venturini Motorsports	Toyota	23.615	133.390
9	2	Eloy Falcón	Rev Racing	Chevrolet	23.884	131.887
10	23	Tyler Reif (R)	Sigma Performance Services	Chevrolet	24.062	130.912
11	79	Isaac Kitzmiller (R)	ACR Motorsports	Chevrolet	24.094	130.738
12	97	Jason Kitzmiller	CR7 Motorsports	Chevrolet	24.215	130.085
13	11	Zachary Tinkle	Fast Track Racing	Toyota	24.387	129.167
14	27	Tim Richmond	Richmond Motorsports	Toyota	24.478	128.687
15	10	Tony Cosentino	Fast Track Racing	Ford	24.668	127.696
16	68	Regina Sirvent	Kimmel Racing	Ford	25.092	125.538
17	12	Takuma Koga (R)	Fast Track Racing	Toyota	25.326	124.378
18	99	Michael Maples	Maples Motorsports	Chevrolet	25.425	123.894
19	7	Kadence Davenport	CCM Racing	Chevrolet	25.455	123.748
20	67	Austin Vaughn (R)	Maples Motorsports	Chevrolet	25.622	122.941
21	31	Quinn Davis	Rise Motorsports	Toyota	25.667	122.726
22	06	Brayton Laster (R)	Wayne Peterson Racing	Ford	26.629	118.292
23	03	Alex Clubb	Clubb Racing Inc.	Ford	26.674	118.093
24	48	Brad Smith	Brad Smith Motorsports	Ford	27.454	114.737
25	9	Mike Basham	Fast Track Racing	Toyota	27.583	114.201
26	01	Trevor Ward	Fast Track Racing	Toyota	27.659	113.887
27	86	Colby Evans	Clubb Racing Inc.	Ford	29.794	105.726
Official qualifying results

== Race results ==
Fin	St	#	Driver	Team	Make	Laps	Led	Status	Pts
1	2	28	Brenden Queen (R)	Pinnacle Racing Group	Chevrolet	150	112	Running	48
2	1	18	Brent Crews	Joe Gibbs Racing	Toyota	150	38	Running	44
3	3	20	Lawless Alan	Venturini Motorsports	Toyota	150	0	Running	41
4	6	55	Isabella Robusto (R)	Venturini Motorsports	Toyota	150	0	Running	40
5	4	6	Lavar Scott	Rev Racing	Chevrolet	150	0	Running	39
6	11	79	Isaac Kitzmiller (R)	ACR Motorsports	Chevrolet	150	0	Running	38
7	5	70	Sam Corry	Nitro Motorsports	Toyota	150	0	Running	37
8	9	2	Eloy Falcón	Rev Racing	Chevrolet	149	0	Running	36
9	8	25	Mason Mitchell	Venturini Motorsports	Toyota	149	0	Running	35
10	12	97	Jason Kitzmiller	CR7 Motorsports	Chevrolet	149	0	Running	34
11	10	23	Tyler Reif (R)	Sigma Performance Services	Chevrolet	149	0	Running	33
12	13	11	Zachary Tinkle	Fast Track Racing	Toyota	149	0	Running	32
13	16	68	Regina Sirvent	Kimmel Racing	Ford	147	0	Running	31
14	15	10	Tony Cosentino	Fast Track Racing	Ford	147	0	Running	30
15	21	31	Quinn Davis	Rise Motorsports	Toyota	143	0	Running	29
16	18	99	Michael Maples	Maples Motorsports	Chevrolet	141	0	Running	28
17	19	7	Kadence Davenport	CCM Racing	Chevrolet	139	0	Running	27
18	20	67	Austin Vaughn (R)	Maples Motorsports	Chevrolet	137	0	Running	26
19	14	27	Tim Richmond	Richmond Motorsports	Toyota	135	0	Running	25
20	23	03	Alex Clubb	Clubb Racing Inc.	Ford	133	0	Running	24
21	22	06	Brayton Laster (R)	Wayne Peterson Racing	Ford	131	0	Running	23
22	17	12	Takuma Koga (R)	Fast Track Racing	Toyota	129	0	Mechanical	22
23	27	86	Colby Evans	Clubb Racing Inc.	Ford	62	0	Mechanical	21
24	7	15	Kris Wright	Venturini Motorsports	Toyota	27	0	Accident	20
25	25	9	Mike Basham	Fast Track Racing	Toyota	11	0	Mechanical	19
26	26	01	Trevor Ward	Fast Track Racing	Toyota	10	0	Mechanical	18
27	24	48	Brad Smith	Brad Smith Motorsports	Ford	9	0	Mechanical	17
Official race results

== Standings after the race ==
Drivers' Championship standings (ARCA Main)

	Pos	Driver	Points
	1	Brenden Queen	602
	2	Lawless Alan	569 (–33)
	3	Lavar Scott	556 (–46)
	4	Jason Kitzmiller	488 (–114)
	5	Isabella Robusto	477 (–125)
	6	Alex Clubb	413 (–189)
	7	Michael Maples	403 (–199)
	8	Brayton Laster	387 (–215)
2	9	Brad Smith	274 (–328)
1	10	Andy Jankowiak	262 (–340)

Drivers' Championship standings (ARCA East)

	Pos	Driver	Points
	1	Isaac Kitzmiller	319
	2	Tyler Reif	300 (–19)
	3	Zachary Tinkle	289 (–30)
	4	Takuma Koga	254 (–65)
	5	Austin Vaughn	246 (–73)
	6	Brad Smith	221 (–98)
1	7	Brent Crews	163 (–156)
4	8	Lavar Scott	146 (–173)
2	9	Max Reaves	146 (–173)
5	10	Brenden Queen	140 (–179)

- Note: Only the first 10 positions are included for the driver standings.

Previous race: 2025 LiUNA! 150 (ARCA)	ARCA Menards Series; 2025 season	Next race: 2025 General Tire 100 at The Glen

Previous race: 2025 LiUNA! 150 (ARCA)	ARCA Menards Series East; 2025 season	Next race: 2025 Bush's Beans 200
