= E. J. Tamayo =

American racing driver

- Born: August 17, 2006 (age 20); Miami, Florida, U.S.

ARCA Menards Series career
- 1 race run over 1 year
- Best finish: 78th (2024)
- First race: 2024 Shore Lunch 250 (Elko)
Wins	Top tens	Poles
0	1	0

ARCA Menards Series East career
- 1 race run over 1 year
- Best finish: 63rd (2025)
- First race: 2025 Pensacola 150 (Pensacola)
Wins	Top tens	Poles
0	0	0
- Statistics up to date as of April 8, 2025.

E. J. Tamayo (born August 17, 2006) is an American professional stock car racing driver who last competed part-time in the ARCA Menards Series East, driving the No. 01 Ford for Fast Track Racing.

== Racing career ==
Tamayo first started racing at the age of ten, where he drove go-karts at the AMR Homestead Miami Motorplex track in Homestead, Florida, where he amassed a number of wins and series championships. In 2021, he progressed to late models, primarily in Carolina Pro Late Model Series, where he has amassed thirteen top-ten finishes since 2021.

In 2024, it was revealed that Tamayo would make his debut in the ARCA Menards Series at Elko Speedway, driving the No. 45 Ford for Tamayo Cosentino Racing, which is the team he owns alongside Tony Cosentino. After placing eleventh in the lone practice session, he qualified in tenth, and finished on the lead lap in sixth place.

In 2025, it was announced that Tamayo would run a partial schedule in the ARCA Menards Series East, driving the No. 01 Ford for Fast Track Racing.

== Motorsports results ==
=== Stock car career summary ===
Season	Series	Team	Races	Wins	Top 5	Top 10	Points	Position
2024	ARCA Menards Series	Tamayo Cosentino Racing	1	0	0	1	38	78th
2025	ARCA Menards Series East	Fast Track Racing	1	0	0	0	26	63rd
2026	CARS Pro Late Model Tour	Copp Motorsports	0	0	0	0	5	90th

=== ARCA Menards Series ===
(key) (Bold – Pole position awarded by qualifying time. Italics – Pole position earned by points standings or practice time. * – Most laps led.)

ARCA Menards Series results
Year	Team	No.	Make	1	2	3	4	5	6	7	8	9	10	11	12	13	14	15	16	17	18	19	20	AMSC	Pts	Ref
2024	Tamayo Cosentino Racing	45	Ford	DAY	PHO	TAL	DOV	KAN	CLT	IOW	MOH	BLN	IRP	SLM	ELK; 6	MCH	ISF	MLW	DSF	GLN	BRI	KAN	TOL	78th	38	

==== ARCA Menards Series East ====
ARCA Menards Series East results
Year	Team	No.	Make	1	2	3	4	5	6	7	8	AMSEC	Pts	Ref
2025	Fast Track Racing	01	Ford	FIF; 18	CAR	NSV	FRS	DOV	IRP	IOW	BRI	63rd	26	

=== CARS Pro Late Model Tour ===
(key)

CARS Pro Late Model Tour results
Year	Team	No.	Make	1	2	3	4	5	6	7	8	9	10	11	CPLMTC	Pts	Ref
2026	Copp Motorsports	83	Dodge	SNM	NSV	CRW	ACE	NWS	HCY	AND	FLC	TCM; DNQ	NPS	SBO	90th	5	
