= London McKenzie =

American racing driver

- Born: October 15, 2009 (age 17); Asheboro, North Carolina, U.S.
- Achievements: 2024 INEX Semi-Pro Asphalt National Champion
- Awards: 2026 CARS Late Model Stock Car Tour Rookie of the Year

ARCA Menards Series East career
- 2 races run over 1 year
- Best finish: 8th (2025)
- First race: 2025 Pensacola 150 (Pensacola)
- Last race: 2025 Rockingham ARCA 125 (Rockingham)
Wins	Top tens	Poles
0	1	0
- Statistics up to date as of April 19, 2025.

London McKenzie (born October 15, 2009) is an American professional stock car racing driver who currently competes in the zMAX CARS Tour, driving the No. 95 Chevrolet for AK Performance in the Late Model Stock Tour, and for Kyle Beattie Racing in the Pro Late Model Tour. He has previously competed in the ARCA Menards Series East.

== Racing career ==
McKenzie has previously competed in series such as the INEX Winter Nationals, the INEX Winter Heat Series, the INEX Summer Shootout, and the INEX Nashville Spring Series.

On February 26, 2025, it was announced that McKenzie would run full-time in the ARCA Menards Series East, driving the No. 93 for CW Motorsports. However, he only ran in the first two races, finishing eighth at Five Flags Speedway, and finishing 27th at Rockingham Speedway after a crash in practice.

In 2026, McKenzie would make his debut in the CARS Tour, where he will attempt to run full-time in both the Late Model Stock Tour and the Pro Late Model Tour, driving for AK Performance and Kyle Beattie Racing respectively.

== Personal life ==
McKenzie is the son of fellow racing driver Brandon McKenzie, who previously drove in ARCA for two races in 2015.

== Motorsports results ==
=== Stock car career summary ===
Season	Series	Team	Races	Wins	Top 5	Top 10	Points	Position
2025	ARCA Menards Series East	CW Motorsports	2	0	0	1	53	40th
2026	CARS Pro Late Model Tour	Kyle Beattie Racing	4	0	1	1	112	19th
2026	CARS Late Model Stock Car Tour	AK Performance	13	0	0	4	356	10th

=== ARCA Menards Series East ===
(key) (Bold – Pole position awarded by qualifying time. Italics – Pole position earned by points standings or practice time. * – Most laps led. ** – All laps led.)

ARCA Menards Series East results
Year	Team	No.	Make	1	2	3	4	5	6	7	8	AMSEC	Pts	Ref
2025	CW Motorsports	93	Ford	FIF; 8	CAR; 27	NSV	FRS	DOV	IRP	IOW	BRI	40th	53	

=== CARS Late Model Stock Car Tour ===
(key) (Bold – Pole position awarded by qualifying time. Italics – Pole position earned by points standings or practice time. * – Most laps led. ** – All laps led.)

CARS Late Model Stock Car Tour results
Year	Team	No.	Make	1	2	3	4	5	6	7	8	9	10	11	12	13	14	CLMSCTC	Pts	Ref
2026	AK Performance	95	Chevy	SNM; 26	WCS; DNQ	NSV; 8	CRW; 9	**ACE**; 6	LGY; 22	DOM; 8	NWS; 13	HCY; 16	AND; 13	FLC; 26	TCM; 24	NPS; 11		10th	356	
2026	AK Performance	95	Toyota														SBO; 16	10th	356	

=== CARS Pro Late Model Tour ===
(key)

CARS Pro Late Model Tour results
Year	Team	No.	Make	1	2	3	4	5	6	7	8	9	10	11	CPLMTC	Pts	Ref
2026	Kyle Beattie Racing	95	Chevy	SNM; 3	NSV; 23	CRW; 16	ACE; Wth	NWS; 20	HCY	AND	FLC	TCM	NPS	SBO	19th	112	
