= Brent Stover =

American sportscaster

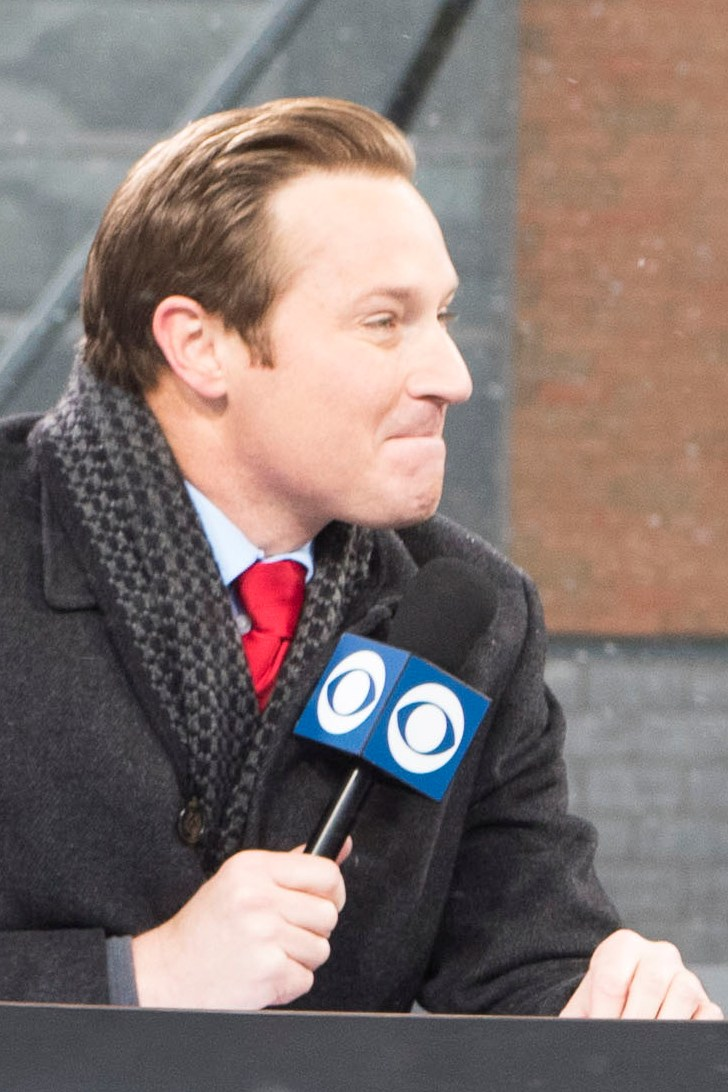
- Stover in 2017
- Occupation: TV sportscaster
- Known for: CBS Sports and NASCAR on Fox

Brent Stover is an American sportscaster who works for CBSSN. and NASCAR on Fox as the rotating play-by-play for their Craftsmen Truck Series & ARCA Menards Series TV coverage.

== Sportscasting career ==
Stover is a studio host and play-by-play announcer for CBS Sports. He joined the network in 2010, announcing college football and college basketball, along with the World's Strongest Man competition. He has performed a similar role with the Big Ten Network and FSN Midwest and FSN Southwest. He also has been a studio host for coverage of the St. Louis Cardinals and Pittsburgh Pirates and was a postgame host for the St. Louis Rams Radio Network. He was the voice of the Chicago Sky of the WNBA. He is an occasional guest host on the Artie Lange Show. He also covers Major League Lacrosse and the Arena Football League on occasion on CBS Sports Network.

In 2023, Stover was hired by NASCAR on Fox to fill in for Jamie Little as play-by-play for the ARCA Menards Series race at Berlin Raceway. Little, who is also a pit reporter for Fox's Cup Series coverage, took that weekend off as it was the week following the end of Fox's Cup Series coverage for the year.

In 2026, Stover began covering games for the Indoor Football League on Yahoo! Sports Network and Overnght. He also serves as the league's director of broadcasting and is the host of its Inside the IFL podcast.

== Personal life ==
Stover graduated from Kansas State University with a degree in journalism where he ran track-and-field and cross country. He is an aspiring country musician playing around NYC.
