= 2025 Rockingham ARCA 125 =

2nd race of the 2025 ARCA Menards Series East

Race details
- Race 2 of 8 of the 2025 ARCA Menards Series East
- Date: April 19, 2025
- Official name: 1st Annual Rockingham ARCA 125
- Location: Rockingham Speedway in Rockingham, North Carolina
- Course: Permanent racing facility
- Course length: 0.94 miles (1.51 km)
- Distance: 125 laps, 127 mi (204 km)
- Scheduled distance: 125 laps, 127 mi (204 km)
- Average speed: 143.730 mph (231.311 km/h)

Pole position
Driver	Brent Crews	Joe Gibbs Racing
- Time: 22.256

Most laps led
Driver	Brent Crews	Joe Gibbs Racing
- Laps: 121

Winner
No. 81	Brent Crews	Joe Gibbs Racing

Television in the United States
- Network: FloRacing; Tubi
- Announcers: Charles Krall and Eric Brennan

Radio in the United States
- Radio: ARCA Racing Network

The 2025 Rockingham ARCA 125 was the second stock car race of the 2025 ARCA Menards Series East season, and the 1st running of the event. The race was held on Saturday, April 19, 2025, at Rockingham Speedway in Rockingham, North Carolina, a 0.94 miles (1.51 km) permanent asphalt oval shaped short track. The race took the scheduled 125 laps to complete. Brent Crews, driving for Joe Gibbs Racing, would have an incredible performance, winning the pole and leading all but four laps to earn his first career ARCA Menards Series East win. To fill out the podium, William Sawalich, also driving for Joe Gibbs Racing, and Eloy Sebastián, driving for Rev Racing in his series debut, would finish 2nd and 3rd, respectively.

This was the first ARCA Menards Series East race to be held at Rockingham since 2012.

== Entry list ==
- (R) denotes rookie driver.

#	Driver	Team	Make	Sponsor
00	Corey Aiken	VWV Racing	Toyota	Vaughn Wilcox & Vaughn Racing
01	Tim Monroe	Fast Track Racing	Ford	Creed & Garner Roofing / Pearsons Truck Svc.
2	Lanie Buice	Rev Racing	Chevrolet	Max Siegel Inc.
06	Nate Moeller	Wayne Peterson Racing	Toyota	Peterson Motorsports
6	Lavar Scott	Rev Racing	Chevrolet	Max Siegel Inc.
9	Blaine Donahue	Fast Track Racing	Toyota	Putting Dragon / Lazarus Entertainment
10	Eloy Sebastián	Rev Racing	Chevrolet	Max Siegel Inc.
11	Zachary Tinkle	Fast Track Racing	Toyota	Scouting America
12	Takuma Koga (R)	Fast Track Racing	Toyota	Macnica Yit Ikedo / CKB
18	William Sawalich	Joe Gibbs Racing	Toyota	Starkey
20	Jake Finch	Venturini Motorsports	Toyota	Phoenix Construction
23	Tyler Reif (R)	Sigma Performance Services	Chevrolet	SPS / Vegas Fastener Manufacturing
24	Spencer Gallagher	Sigma Performance Services	Chevrolet	SPS / Allegiant Travel Company
25	Patrick Staropoli	Venturini Motorsports	Toyota	Syfovre
28	Austin Green	Pinnacle Racing Group	Chevrolet	OVERPLAY
31	Tim Goulet	Rise Motorsports	Toyota	Rise Motorsports
34	Austin Vaughn (R)	VWV Racing	Ford	Safford Trading Company
39	Caleb Costner	CW Motorsports	Toyota	Performance Cleaners
40	Andrew Patterson	Andrew Patterson Racing	Chevrolet	WinSupply
48	Brad Smith	Brad Smith Motorsports	Ford	Gary's Speed Shop
56	Timmy Hill	Hill Motorsports	Toyota	Hill Motorsports
73	Andy Jankowiak	KLAS Motorsports	Toyota	Dak's Market / Whelen
76	Kole Raz (R)	AM Racing	Ford	Cyclum Nextgen Travel Centers
79	Isaac Kitzmiller (R)	ACR Motorsports	Chevrolet	A.L.L. Construction / Carter Cat
81	Brent Crews	Joe Gibbs Racing	Toyota	Mobil 1
86	A. J. Moyer	Clubb Racing Inc.	Ford	River's Edge Cottages & RV Park
93	London McKenzie (R)	CW Motorsports	Ford	McKenzie Real Estate
Official entry list

== Practice ==
The first and only practice session was held on Saturday, April 19, at 9:30 AM EST, and would last for 50 minutes. Brent Crews, driving for Joe Gibbs Racing, would set the fastest time in the session, with a lap of 22.118, and a speed of 152.998 mph (246.226 km/h).

Pos.	#	Driver	Team	Make	Time	Speed
1	81	Brent Crews	Joe Gibbs Racing	Toyota	22.118	152.998
2	28	Austin Green	Pinnacle Racing Group	Chevrolet	22.521	150.260
3	6	Lavar Scott	Rev Racing	Chevrolet	22.666	149.299
Full practice results

== Qualifying ==
Qualifying was held on Saturday, April 19, at 10:35 AM EST. The qualifying system used is a multi-car, multi-lap based system. All drivers will be on track for a 20-minute timed session, and whoever sets the fastest in the session will win the pole.

Brent Crews, driving for Joe Gibbs Racing, would score the pole for the race, with a lap of 22.256, and a speed of 152.049 mph (244.699 km/h).

=== Qualifying results ===
Pos.	#	Driver	Team	Make	Time	Speed
1	81	Brent Crews	Joe Gibbs Racing	Toyota	22.256	152.049
2	18	William Sawalich	Joe Gibbs Racing	Toyota	22.392	151.125
3	23	Tyler Reif (R)	Sigma Performance Services	Chevrolet	22.611	149.662
4	28	Austin Green	Pinnacle Racing Group	Chevrolet	22.636	149.496
5	2	Lanie Buice	Rev Racing	Chevrolet	22.722	148.931
6	20	Jake Finch	Venturini Motorsports	Toyota	22.753	148.728
7	25	Patrick Staropoli	Venturini Motorsports	Toyota	22.789	148.493
8	6	Lavar Scott	Rev Racing	Chevrolet	22.791	148.480
9	76	Kole Raz (R)	AM Racing	Ford	22.874	147.941
10	10	Eloy Sebastián	Rev Racing	Chevrolet	22.932	147.567
11	79	Isaac Kitzmiller (R)	ACR Motorsports	Chevrolet	22.972	147.310
12	73	Andy Jankowiak	KLAS Motorsports	Toyota	22.975	147.291
13	24	Spencer Gallagher	Sigma Performance Services	Chevrolet	23.075	146.652
14	56	Timmy Hill	Hill Motorsports	Toyota	23.266	145.448
15	40	Andrew Patterson	Andrew Patterson Racing	Chevrolet	23.615	143.299
16	11	Zachary Tinkle	Fast Track Racing	Toyota	24.196	139.858
17	9	Blaine Donahue	Fast Track Racing	Toyota	24.491	138.173
18	12	Takuma Koga (R)	Fast Track Racing	Toyota	24.867	136.084
19	34	Austin Vaughn (R)	VWV Racing	Ford	25.212	134.222
20	01	Tim Monroe	Fast Track Racing	Ford	25.444	132.998
21	31	Tim Goulet	Rise Motorsports	Toyota	25.569	132.348
22	86	A. J. Moyer	Clubb Racing Inc.	Ford	27.461	123.229
23	48	Brad Smith	Brad Smith Motorsports	Ford	27.823	121.626
24	00	Corey Aiken	VWV Racing	Toyota	27.846	121.526
25	06	Nate Moeller	Wayne Peterson Racing	Toyota	31.261	108.250
26	39	Caleb Costner	CW Motorsports	Toyota	–	–
27	93	London McKenzie (R)	CW Motorsports	Ford	–	–
Official qualifying results

== Race results ==
Fin	St	#	Driver	Team	Make	Laps	Led	Status	Pts
1	1	81	Brent Crews	Joe Gibbs Racing	Toyota	125	121	Running	49
2	2	18	William Sawalich	Joe Gibbs Racing	Toyota	125	4	Running	43
3	10	10	Eloy Sebastián	Rev Racing	Chevrolet	125	0	Running	41
4	7	25	Patrick Staropoli	Venturini Motorsports	Toyota	125	0	Running	40
5	12	73	Andy Jankowiak	KLAS Motorsports	Toyota	125	0	Running	39
6	11	79	Isaac Kitzmiller (R)	ACM Motorsports	Chevrolet	125	0	Running	38
7	9	76	Kole Raz (R)	AM Racing	Ford	125	0	Running	37
8	5	2	Lanie Buice	Rev Racing	Chevrolet	125	0	Running	36
9	8	6	Lavar Scott	Rev Racing	Chevrolet	123	0	Running	35
10	13	24	Spencer Gallagher	Sigma Performance Services	Chevrolet	123	0	Running	34
11	16	11	Zachary Tinkle	Fast Track Racing	Toyota	121	0	Running	33
12	4	28	Austin Green	Pinnacle Racing Group	Chevrolet	119	0	Running	32
13	19	34	Austin Vaughn (R)	VWV Racing	Ford	116	0	Running	31
14	20	01	Tim Monroe	Fast Track Racing	Ford	116	0	Running	30
15	18	12	Takuma Koga (R)	Fast Track Racing	Toyota	114	0	Running	29
16	17	9	Blaine Donahue	Fast Track Racing	Toyota	113	0	Running	28
17	3	23	Tyler Reif (R)	Sigma Performance Services	Chevrolet	75	0	Accident	27
18	15	40	Andrew Patterson	Andrew Patterson Racing	Chevrolet	70	0	Engine	26
19	21	31	Tim Goulet	Rise Motorsports	Toyota	44	0	Parked	25
20	14	56	Timmy Hill	Hill Motorsports	Toyota	43	0	Accident	24
21	22	86	A. J. Moyer	Clubb Racing Inc.	Ford	38	0	Parked	23
22	26	39	Caleb Costner	CW Motorsports	Toyota	21	0	Handling	22
23	25	06	Nate Moeller	Wayne Peterson Racing	Toyota	18	0	Parked	21
24	23	48	Brad Smith	Brad Smith Motorsports	Ford	16	0	Fire Extinguisher	20
25	24	00	Corey Aiken	VWV Racing	Toyota	7	0	Valve Seal	19
26	6	20	Jake Finch	Venturini Motorsports	Toyota	2	0	Accident	18
27	27	93	London McKenzie (R)	CW Motorsports	Ford	0	0	DNS	17
Official race results

== Standings after the race ==
Drivers' Championship standings

	Pos	Driver	Points
4	1	Isaac Kitzmiller	77
	2	Kole Raz	74 (–3)
	3	Tyler Reif	68 (–9)
6	4	Zachary Tinkle	67 (–10)
6	5	Takuma Koga	62 (–15)
1	6	Timmy Hill	61 (–16)
8	7	Austin Vaughn	60 (–17)
	8	London McKenzie	53 (–24)
8	9	Max Reaves	48 (–28)
	10	Brent Crews	48 (–28)

- Note: Only the first 10 positions are included for the driver standings.

Previous race: 2025 Pensacola 150	ARCA Menards Series East; 2025 season	Next race: 2025 Music City 150
