= 2025 Pensacola 150 =

1st race of the 2025 ARCA Menards Series East

Race details
- Race 1 of 8 of the 2025 ARCA Menards Series East
- Date: March 22, 2025
- Official name: 6th Annual Pensacola 150
- Location: Five Flags Speedway in Pensacola, Florida
- Course: Permanent racing facility
- Course length: 0.5 miles (0.80 km)
- Distance: 150 laps, 75 mi (120 km)
- Scheduled distance: 150 laps, 75 mi (120 km)
- Average speed: 73.449 mph (118.205 km/h)

Pole position
Driver	Max Reaves	Joe Gibbs Racing
- Time: 17.266

Most laps led
Driver	Max Reaves	Joe Gibbs Racing
- Laps: 95

Winner
No. 18	Max Reaves	Joe Gibbs Racing

Television in the United States
- Network: FloRacing
- Announcers: Charles Krall

Radio in the United States
- Radio: ARCA Racing Network

The 2025 Pensacola 150 was the first stock car race of the 2025 ARCA Menards Series East season, and the 6th running of the event. The race was held on Saturday, March 22, 2025, at Five Flags Speedway in Pensacola, Florida, a 0.5 mile (0.80 km) permanent asphalt oval shaped short track. The race took the scheduled 150 laps to complete.

Max Reaves, driving for Joe Gibbs Racing, would pull off an incredible performance, winning the pole and leading a race-high 95 laps to earn his first career ARCA Menards Series East win in his first start. Kole Raz took over the lead in the middle stages, leading 57 laps before being passed by Reaves in the final 26 laps, finishing 2nd. To fill out the podium, Tyler Reif, driving for Sigma Performance Services, would finish in 3rd, respectively.

== Report ==
=== Background ===
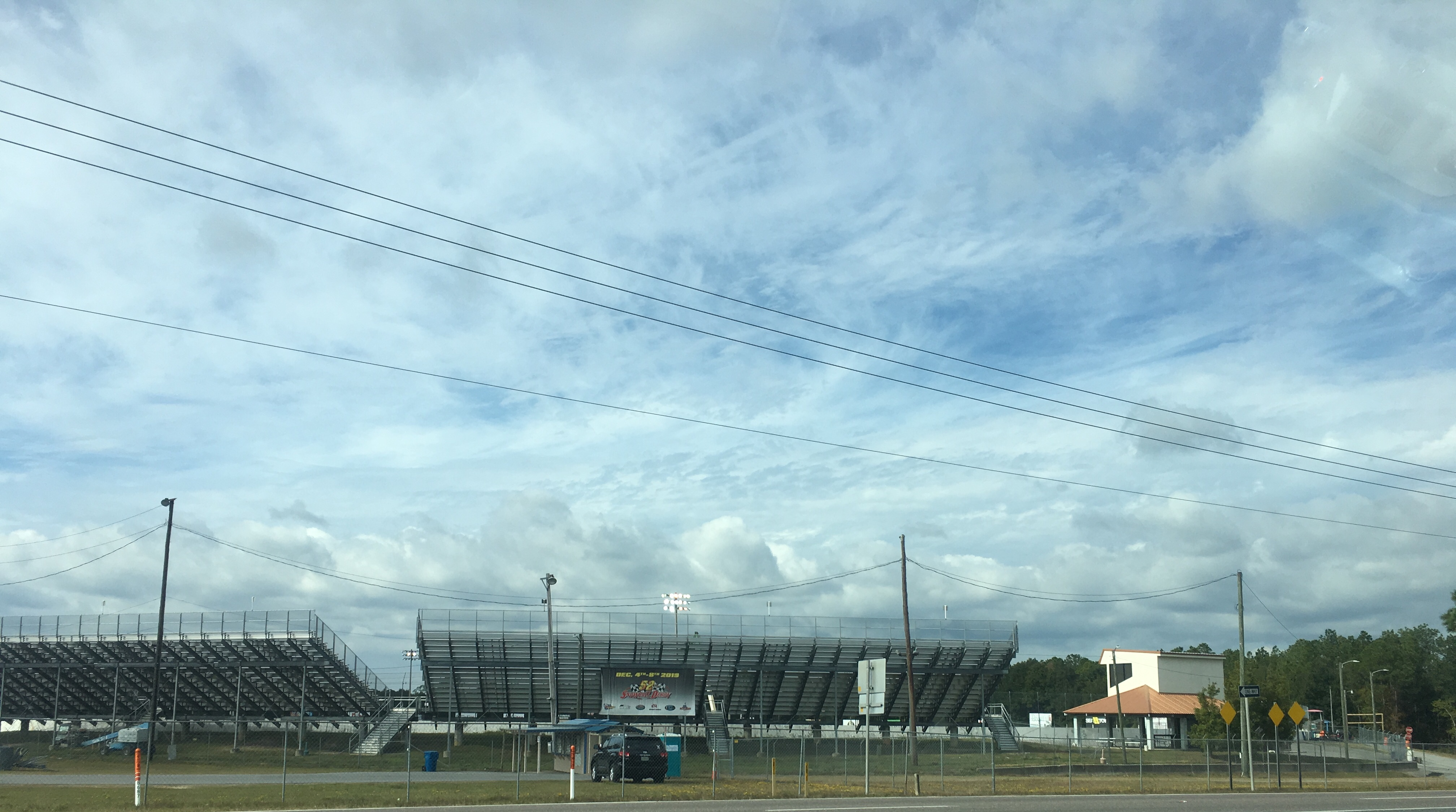
Five Flags Speedway, the track where the race was held.

Five Flags Speedway is a half-mile (0.8 km) paved oval racetrack in Pensacola, Florida. It opened in 1953 and is located on Pine Forest Road. It is christened after the nickname of Pensacola—"City of Five Flags."

It runs several local classes during the regular racing season (March – October). These classes include Super Late Models, Pro Late Models, Pro Trucks, Outlaw Stocks, Sportsman, and Pure Stocks. The races are usual held on Friday nights bi-weekly. The track has also hosted many regional touring series.

In 2019, the ARCA Menards Series returned to the track, but for one year only. After the merge between ARCA and NASCAR after the 2019 season, the former NASCAR K&N Pro Series East, (now called ARCA Menards Series East) began racing at Five Flags in 2020.

==== Entry list ====
- (R) denotes rookie driver.

#	Driver	Team	Make	Sponsor
00	Corey Aiken	VWV Racing	Toyota	Vaughn Wilcox & Vaughn
01	E. J. Tamayo	Fast Track Racing	Ford	Tamayo Sports Florida / Amici Engineering
4	Carson Brown	Hettinger Racing	Chevrolet	PayCafe / EBB Logistics / GBS Brand Connect
06	Nate Moeller	Wayne Peterson Racing	Toyota	Peterson Motorsports
9	Cody Dennison	Fast Track Racing	Toyota	Flux / Timcast
10	Mike Basham	Fast Track Racing	Ford	Double "H" Ranch
11	Zachary Tinkle	Fast Track Racing	Toyota	Universal Technical Institute
12	Takuma Koga	Fast Track Racing	Toyota	Macnica Yit Ikedo / CKB
18	Max Reaves	Joe Gibbs Racing	Toyota	Cook Out
23	Tyler Reif (R)	Sigma Performance Services	Chevrolet	Sigma Performance Services
28	Connor Mosack	Pinnacle Racing Group	Chevrolet	Chevrolet Performance
31	Rita Goulet	Rise Motorsports	Toyota	NationalPolice.org
34	Austin Vaughn (R)	VWV Racing	Ford	Safford Trading Company
39	D. L. Wilson	CW Motorsports	Toyota	Performance Cleaners
40	Andrew Patterson	Andrew Patterson Racing	Chevrolet	WinSupply / SCS Gearbox
48	Brad Smith	Brad Smith Motorsports	Ford	Gary's Speed Shop
56	Timmy Hill	Hill Motorsports	Toyota	Hill Motorsports
76	Kole Raz	AM Racing	Ford	Cyclum Nextgen Travel Centers
79	Isaac Kitzmiller (R)	ACR Motorsports	Chevrolet	A. L. L. Construction / Carter Cat
85	Becca Monopoli	City Garage Motorsports	Ford	Orlando Health
93	London McKenzie (R)	CW Motorsports	Ford	McKenzie Real Estate
95	Hunter Wright	MAN Motorsports	Toyota	Sunset Park RV / Cedar City RV
Official entry list

== Practice ==
The first and only practice session was held on Saturday, March 22, at 2:00 PM EST, and would last for 60 minutes. Max Reaves, driving for Joe Gibbs Racing, would set the fastest time in the session, with a lap of 17.482, and a speed of 102.963 mph (165.703 km/h).

Pos.	#	Driver	Team	Make	Time	Speed
1	18	Max Reaves	Joe Gibbs Racing	Toyota	17.482	102.963
2	76	Kole Raz	AM Racing	Ford	17.724	101.557
3	79	Isaac Kitzmiller (R)	ACR Motorsports	Chevrolet	17.732	101.511
Full practice results

== Qualifying ==
Qualifying was held on Saturday, March 22, at 4:30 PM EST. The qualifying procedure used is a single-car, two-lap based system with one round. Drivers will be on track by themselves and will have two laps to post a qualifying time, and whoever sets the fastest time will win the pole.

Max Reaves, driving for Joe Gibbs Racing, would score the pole for the race, with a lap of 17.266, and a speed of 104.251 mph (167.776 km/h).

After crashing in practice, Andrew Patterson withdrew from the race.

=== Qualifying results ===
Pos.	#	Driver	Team	Make	Time	Speed
1	18	Max Reaves	Joe Gibbs Racing	Toyota	17.266	104.251
2	28	Connor Mosack	Pinnacle Racing Group	Chevrolet	17.415	103.359
3	76	Kole Raz	AM Racing	Ford	17.446	103.176
4	79	Isaac Kitzmiller (R)	ACR Motorsports	Chevrolet	17.525	102.710
5	23	Tyler Reif (R)	Sigma Performance Services	Chevrolet	17.530	102.681
6	4	Carson Brown	Hettinger Racing	Chevrolet	17.546	102.587
7	95	Hunter Wright	MAN Motorsports	Toyota	17.858	100.795
8	93	London McKenzie (R)	CW Motorsports	Ford	17.923	100.430
9	56	Timmy Hill	Hill Motorsports	Toyota	18.020	99.889
10	12	Takuma Koga	Fast Track Racing	Toyota	18.202	98.890
11	01	E. J. Tamayo	Fast Track Racing	Ford	18.332	98.189
12	85	Becca Monopoli	City Garage Motorsports	Ford	18.546	97.056
13	39	D. L. Wilson	CW Motorsports	Toyota	18.561	96.978
14	9	Cody Dennison	Fast Track Racing	Toyota	18.631	96.613
15	11	Zachary Tinkle	Fast Track Racing	Toyota	18.668	96.422
16	34	Austin Vaughn (R)	VWV Racing	Ford	18.954	94.967
17	10	Mike Basham	Fast Track Racing	Ford	19.191	93.794
18	48	Brad Smith	Brad Smith Motorsports	Ford	19.832	90.762
19	06	Nate Moeller	Wayne Peterson Racing	Toyota	19.994	90.027
20	31	Rita Goulet	Rise Motorsports	Toyota	20.133	89.405
21	00	Corey Aiken	VWV Racing	Toyota	22.877	78.682
22	40	Andrew Patterson	Andrew Patterson Racing	Chevrolet	–	–
Official qualifying results

== Race results ==
Fin	St	#	Driver	Team	Make	Laps	Led	Status	Pts
1	1	18	Max Reaves	Joe Gibbs Racing	Toyota	150	95	Running	49
2	3	76	Kole Raz	AM Racing	Ford	150	54	Running	43
3	5	23	Tyler Reif	Sigma Performance Services	Chevrolet	150	0	Running	41
4	2	28	Connor Mosack	Pinnacle Racing Group	Chevrolet	150	1	Running	41
5	4	79	Isaac Kitzmiller (R)	ACR Motorsports	Chevrolet	150	0	Running	39
6	6	4	Carson Brown	Hettinger Racing	Chevrolet	150	0	Running	38
7	9	56	Timmy Hill	Hill Motorsports	Toyota	149	0	Running	37
8	8	93	London McKenzie (R)	CW Motorsports	Ford	149	0	Running	36
9	7	95	Hunter Wright	MAN Motorsports	Toyota	148	0	Running	35
10	15	11	Zachary Tinkle	Fast Track Racing	Toyota	148	0	Running	34
11	10	12	Takuma Koga (R)	Fast Track Racing	Toyota	147	0	Running	33
12	13	39	D. L. Wilson	CW Motorsports	Toyota	146	0	Running	32
13	17	10	Mike Basham	Fast Track Racing	Ford	145	0	Running	31
14	12	85	Becca Monopoli	City Garage Motorsports	Ford	144	0	Running	30
15	16	34	Austin Vaughn	VWV Racing	Ford	141	0	Running	29
16	19	06	Nate Moeller	Wayne Peterson Racing	Toyota	135	0	Running	28
17	14	9	Cody Dennison	Fast Track Racing	Toyota	131	0	Running	27
18	11	01	E. J. Tamayo	Fast Track Racing	Ford	101	0	Engine	26
19	21	00	Corey Aiken	VWV Racing	Toyota	32	0	Carburetor	25
20	20	31	Rita Goulet	Rise Motorsports	Toyota	26	0	Mechanical	24
21	18	48	Brad Smith	Brad Smith Motorsports	Ford	4	0	Quit	23
22	22	40	Andrew Patterson	Andrew Patterson Racing	Chevrolet	0	0	DNS	22
Official race results

== Standings after the race ==
Drivers' Championship standings

Pos	Driver	Points
1	Max Reaves	49
2	Kole Raz	43 (-6)
3	Tyler Reif	41 (–7)
4	Connor Mosack	41 (–7)
5	Isaac Kitzmiller	39 (–10)
6	Carson Brown	38 (–11)
7	Timmy Hill	37 (–12)
8	London McKenzie	36 (–13)
9	Hunter Wright	35 (–14)
10	Zachary Tinkle	34 (–15)

- Note: Only the first 10 positions are included for the driver standings.

Previous race: 2024 Bush's Beans 200	ARCA Menards Series East; 2025 season	Next race: 2025 Rockingham ARCA 125
