= 2024 Salem ARCA 200 =

11th race of the 2024 ARCA Menards Series

Race details
- Race 11 of 20 of the 2024 ARCA Menards Series
- Date: July 27, 2024
- Official name: 27th Annual Salem ARCA 200
- Location: Salem Speedway in Salem, Indiana
- Course: Permanent racing facility
- Course length: 0.555 miles (0.893 km)
- Distance: 200 laps, 111 mi (178 km)
- Scheduled distance: 200 laps, 111 mi (178 km)
- Average speed: 66.823 mph (107.541 km/h)

Pole position
Driver	William Sawalich	Joe Gibbs Racing
- Time: 17.101

Most laps led
Driver	William Sawalich	Joe Gibbs Racing
- Laps: 200

Winner
No. 18	William Sawalich	Joe Gibbs Racing

Television in the United States
- Network: FS1
- Announcers: TBA and Phil Parsons

Radio in the United States
- Radio: ARCA Racing Network

The 2024 Salem ARCA 200 was the 11th stock car race of the 2024 ARCA Menards Series season, and the 27th iteration of the event. The race was held on Saturday, July 27, 2024, at Salem Speedway in Salem, Indiana, a 0.555 miles (0.893 km) permanent oval shaped racetrack. The race took the scheduled 200 laps to complete. In an action-packed race, William Sawalich, driving for Joe Gibbs Racing, would dominate, leading all 200 laps and earning his 4th win of the season. To fill out the podium, Andrés Pérez de Lara, driving for Rev Racing and Lavar Scott, driving for Rev Racing, would earn 2nd and 3rd respectfully.

== Report ==
=== Background ===
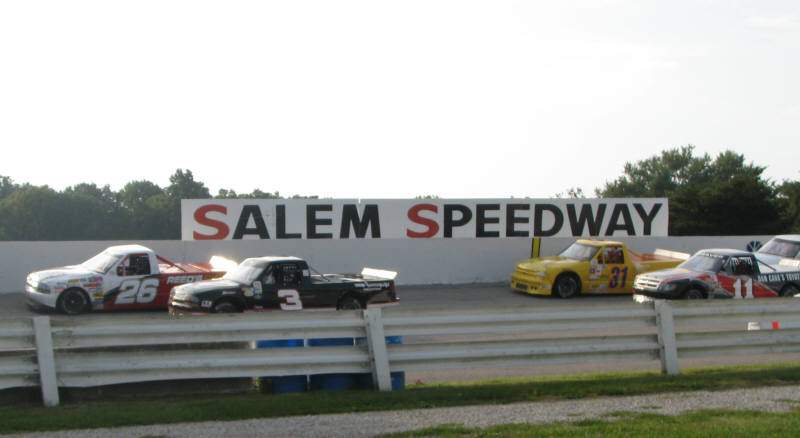
Salem Speedway, the circuit where the race was held.

Salem Speedway is a .555-mile (0.893 km) long paved oval racetrack in Washington Township, Washington County, near Salem, Indiana, United States, approximately 100 miles (160 km) south of Indianapolis. The track has 33° degrees of banking in the corners. Major auto racing series that run at Salem are ARCA and USAC.

==== Entry list ====
- (R) denotes rookie driver.

#	Driver	Team	Make	Sponsor
2	Andrés Pérez de Lara	Rev Racing	Chevrolet	Max Siegel Inc.
03	Alex Clubb	Clubb Racing Inc.	Ford	A. Clubb Lawn Care & Landscaping
06	Brayton Laster	Wayne Peterson Racing	Toyota	@Cyber_Fox_ on X / Bumeisters & Sons
6	Lavar Scott (R)	Rev Racing	Chevrolet	Max Siegel Inc.
10	Ed Pompa	Fast Track Racing	Ford	HYTORC of New York / Double "H" Ranch
11	Cody Dennison (R)	Fast Track Racing	Toyota	Timcast
12	Ryan Roulette	Fast Track Racing	Ford	Bellator Recruiting Academy / VFW
15	Kris Wright	Venturini Motorsports	Toyota	FNB Corporation
18	William Sawalich	Joe Gibbs Racing	Toyota	Starkey / SoundGear
20	Jake Finch	Venturini Motorsports	Toyota	Phoenix Construction
22	Amber Balcaen	Venturini Motorsports	Toyota	ICON Direct
25	Toni Breidinger	Venturini Motorsports	Toyota	Venturini Motorsports
28	Corey Day	Pinnacle Racing Group	Chevrolet	HendrickCars.com
31	Rita Goulet	Rise Motorsports	Chevrolet	NationalPolice.org
32	Christian Rose	AM Racing	Ford	West Virginia Department of Tourism
34	Isaac Johnson	Greg Van Alst Motorsports	Ford	Endress + Hauser
35	Greg Van Alst	Greg Van Alst Motorsports	Ford	Zaki Ali Personal Injury Attorney
48	Brad Smith	Brad Smith Motorsports	Ford	Ski's Graphics
55	Gus Dean	Venturini Motorsports	Toyota	Palmetto Grain Brokerage
68	Mike Basham	Kimmel Racing	Ford	Weddington Custom Homes
69	Will Kimmel	Kimmel Racing	Ford	Weddington Custom Homes
86	Chris Golden	Clubb Racing Inc.	Ford	CRS Suspension
95	Andrew Patterson	MAN Motorsports	Toyota	Winsupply / SCS Gearbox
98	Dale Shearer	Shearer Speed Racing	Toyota	Shearer Speed Racing
99	Michael Maples (R)	Fast Track Racing	Chevrolet	Don Ray Petroleum LLC
Official entry list

== Practice ==
The first and only practice session was held on Saturday, July 27, at 3:45 PM EST, and would last for 45 minutes. William Sawalich, driving for Joe Gibbs Racing, would set the fastest time in the session, with a lap of 17.201, and a speed of 116.156 mph (186.935 km/h).

Pos.	#	Driver	Team	Make	Time	Speed
1	18	William Sawalich	Joe Gibbs Racing	Toyota	17.201	116.156
2	6	Lavar Scott (R)	Rev Racing	Chevrolet	17.402	114.814
3	69	Will Kimmel	Kimmel Racing	Ford	17.519	114.048
Full practice results

== Qualifying ==
Qualifying was held on Saturday, July 27, at 5:15 PM EST. The qualifying system used is a single-car, two-lap system with only one round. Drivers will be on track by themselves and will have two laps to post a qualifying time, and whoever sets the fastest time in that round will win the pole.

William Sawalich, driving for Joe Gibbs Racing, would score the pole for the race, with a lap of 17.101, and a speed of 116.835 mph (188.028 km/h).

=== Qualifying results ===
Pos.	#	Driver	Team	Make	Time	Speed
1	18	William Sawalich	Joe Gibbs Racing	Toyota	17.101	116.835
2	6	Lavar Scott (R)	Rev Racing	Chevrolet	17.348	115.172
3	20	Jake Finch	Venturini Motorsports	Toyota	17.357	115.112
4	25	Toni Breidinger	Venturini Motorsports	Toyota	17.435	114.597
5	28	Corey Day	Pinnacle Racing Group	Chevrolet	17.436	114.591
6	15	Kris Wright	Venturini Motorsports	Toyota	17.446	114.525
7	2	Andrés Pérez de Lara	Rev Racing	Chevrolet	17.476	114.328
8	55	Gus Dean	Venturini Motorsports	Toyota	17.568	113.730
9	22	Amber Balcaen	Venturini Motorsports	Toyota	17.595	113.555
10	69	Will Kimmel	Kimmel Racing	Ford	17.604	113.497
11	32	Christian Rose	AM Racing	Ford	17.699	112.888
12	35	Greg Van Alst	Greg Van Alst Motorsports	Ford	17.730	112.690
13	95	Andrew Patterson	MAN Motorsports	Toyota	17.921	111.489
14	34	Isaac Johnson	Greg Van Alst Motorsports	Ford	18.117	110.283
15	11	Cody Dennison (R)	Fast Track Racing	Toyota	18.844	106.028
16	68	Mike Basham	Kimmel Racing	Ford	18.977	105.285
17	06	Brayton Laster	Wayne Peterson Racing	Toyota	19.180	104.171
18	12	Ryan Roulette	Fast Track Racing	Ford	19.235	103.873
19	99	Michael Maples (R)	Fast Track Racing	Chevrolet	19.420	102.884
20	10	Ed Pompa	Fast Track Racing	Ford	19.712	101.360
21	03	Alex Clubb	Clubb Racing Inc.	Ford	19.830	100.756
22	48	Brad Smith	Brad Smith Motorsports	Ford	20.052	99.641
23	31	Rita Goulet	Rise Motorsports	Chevrolet	20.106	99.373
24	98	Dale Shearer	Shearer Speed Racing	Toyota	20.438	97.759
25	86	Chris Golden	Clubb Racing Inc.	Ford	21.431	93.229
Official qualifying results

== Race results ==
Pos.	St.	#	Driver	Team	Make	Laps	Led	Status	Pts
1	1	18	William Sawalich	Joe Gibbs Racing	Toyota	200	200	Running	49
2	7	2	Andrés Pérez de Lara	Rev Racing	Chevrolet	200	0	Running	42
3	2	6	Lavar Scott (R)	Rev Racing	Chevrolet	200	0	Running	41
4	10	69	Will Kimmel	Kimmel Racing	Ford	199	0	Running	40
5	11	32	Christian Rose	AM Racing	Ford	199	0	Running	39
6	14	34	Issac Johnson	Greg van Alst Motorsports	Ford	199	0	Running	38
7	15	11	Cody Dennison (R)	Fast Track Racing	Toyota	193	0	Running	37
8	18	12	Ryan Roulette	Fast Track Racing	Ford	189	0	Running	36
9	17	06	Brayton Laster	Wayne Peterson Racing	Toyota	186	0	Running	35
10	6	15	Kris Wright	Venturini Motorsports	Toyota	184	0	Running	34
11	19	99	Micheal Maples (R)	Fast Track Racing	Chevrolet	184	0	Running	33
12	21	03	Alex Clubb	Clubb Racing Inc.	Ford	182	0	Running	32
13	23	31	Rita Goulet	Rise Motorsports	Chevrolet	171	0	Running	31
14	8	55	Gus Dean	Venturini Motorsports	Toyota	149	0	Mechanical	30
15	5	28	Corey Day	Pinnacle Racing Group	Chevrolet	132	0	Accident	29
16	4	25	Toni Breidinger	Venturini Motorsports	Toyota	132	0	Accident	28
17	12	35	Greg van Alst	Greg van Alst Motorsports	Ford	93	0	Mechanical	27
18	3	20	Jake Finch	Venturini Motorsports	Toyota	88	0	Accident	26
19	20	10	Ed Pompa	Fast Track Racing	Ford	81	0	Accident	25
20	24	98	Dale Shearer	Shearer Speed Racing	Toyota	40	0	Mechanical	24
21	22	48	Brad Smith	Brad Smith Motorsports	Ford	34	0	Mechanical	23
22	13	95	Andrew Patterson	MAN Motorsports	Toyota	25	0	Mechanical	22
23	16	68	Mike Basham	Kimmel Racing	Ford	3	0	Mechanical	21
24	9	22	Amber Balcaen	Venturini Motorsports	Toyota	2	0	Accident	20
25	25	86	Chris Golden	Clubb Racing Inc.	Ford	1	0	Mechanical	19

== Standings after the race ==
Drivers' Championship standings

	Pos	Driver	Points
	1	Andrés Pérez de Lara	523
	2	Lavar Scott	476 (-47)
	3	Greg Van Alst	462 (–61)
	4	Kris Wright	450 (–73)
2	5	Christian Rose	438 (–85)
	6	Toni Breidinger	430 (–93)
2	7	Amber Balcaen	423 (–100)
	8	Michael Maples	392 (–131)
	9	Alex Clubb	376 (–147)
	10	Cody Dennison	374 (–149)

- Note: Only the first 10 positions are included for the driver standings.

Previous race: 2024 Circle City 200	ARCA Menards Series; 2024 season	Next race: 2024 Shore Lunch 250
