= 2025 Badger 200 =

15th race of the 2025 ARCA Menards Series

Race details
- Race 15 of 20 of the 2025 ARCA Menards Series
- Date: August 22, 2025
- Official name: 1st Annual Badger 200
- Location: Madison International Speedway in Rutland, Wisconsin
- Course: Permanent racing facility
- Course length: 0.500 miles (0.850 km)
- Distance: 200 laps, 100 mi (150 km)
- Scheduled distance: 200 laps, 100 mi (150 km)
- Average speed: 70.093 mph (112.804 km/h)

Pole position
Driver	Max Reaves	Joe Gibbs Racing
- Time: 18.453

Most laps led
Driver	Max Reaves	Joe Gibbs Racing
- Laps: 200

Winner
No. 18	Max Reaves	Joe Gibbs Racing

Television in the United States
- Network: FS1
- Announcers: Eric Brennan and Phil Parsons

Radio in the United States
- Radio: ARCA Racing Network

The 2025 Badger 200 was the 15th stock car race of the 2025 ARCA Menards Series season, and the 1st iteration of the event. The race was held on Friday, August 22, 2025, at Madison International Speedway in Rutland, Wisconsin, a 0.500 mile (0.850 km) permanent oval-shaped short track. The race took the scheduled 200 laps to complete. In ARCA's first trip to Madison since 2019, Max Reaves, driving for Joe Gibbs Racing, was the class of the field and swept the race, leading every lap from the pole position to earn his second career ARCA Menards Series win. To fill out the podium, Lavar Scott, driving for Rev Racing, and Brenden Queen, driving for Pinnacle Racing Group, would finish 2nd and 3rd, respectively.

== Report ==
=== Background ===
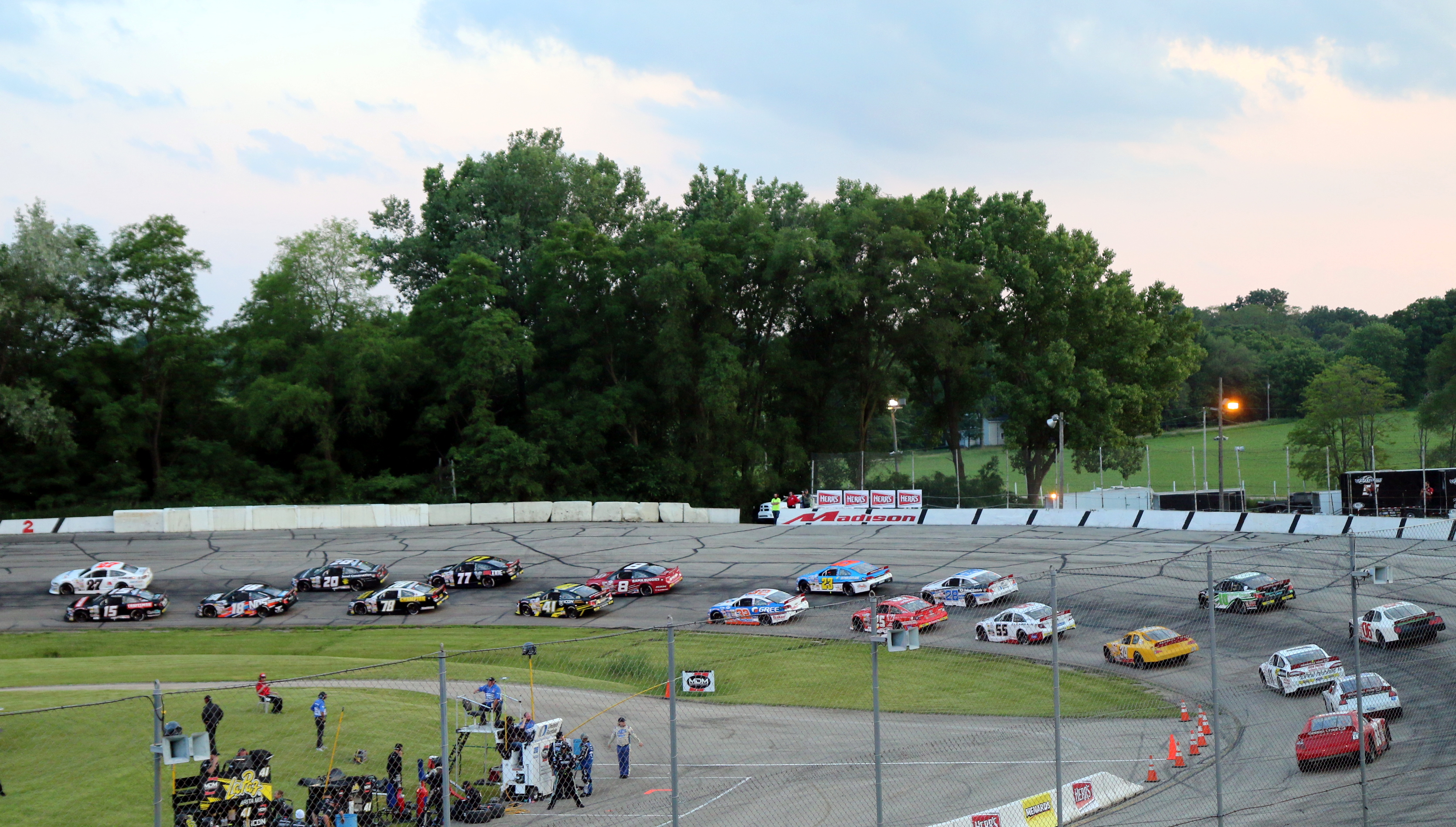
Madison International Speedway, the track where the race will be held.

Madison International Speedway is a half-mile paved oval racetrack in the Town of Rutland near Oregon, Wisconsin, United States. With 18-degree banked turns, the track is billed as "The Track of Champions" and "Wisconsin's Fastest Half Mile." The weekly program at the track runs on Friday nights under NASCAR Advance Auto Parts Weekly Series sanction.

The track opened in the 1950s as a dirt quarter-mile run by several organizations as Oregon Legion Speedway. Sam Bartus purchased the track in 1963 and paved the track. In 1969, he tore down the quarter-mile track and built a state of the art high-banked half-mile oval and named it "Capital Super Speedway". Fred Nielsen bought the track in 1980 with John and Sue McKarns running the track in 1980 and 1981. Tony Zidar and his brother Bob purchased the track in 1983 and the added 29 rows of grandstand seating along with a scoreboard on the backstretch. They built a quarter mile track in the infield of the half mile so that sportsman drivers from Jefferson Speedway could race at the track. The track resumed operation as a dirt track under the name of Impact Speedway from 1987 until 1989 under the ownership of Craig Henmen, where the World of Outlaws Sprint Cars made numerous appearances. The track was closed down until 1992 when Wayne Erickson, the owner of Slinger Super Speedway, took over. Wayne ran the track until 1996 when Jerry Fillner and his son Kevin Fillner took over. The Fillner family operated the track and made several improvements to the pits and upper concession areas. In 2003, Chicago area businessman Terry Kunes purchased the racetrack and hired Roy Kenseth (Matt Kenseth's father) to be the promoter. After two seasons Roy Kenseth started RK Promotions and decided to leave the track. Steve Einhaus was hired to fill the void left by Kenseth. In 2007, Einhaus would be focusing his attention on the newly formed ASA Midwest Tour (now known as ARCA Midwest Tour) Super Late Model Series. Track promotions were turned over to longtime competitor and official Dave Grueneberg. During his tenure, the track had weekly Friday night races in most seasons but in 2013 it was occasional Sunday afternoon races. In 2015, new ARCA Midwest Tour owner Gregg McKarns purchased the speedway from Kunes. He decided to run weekly Late Models races following the Big 8 Series rules with a monthly Super Late Model event. MIS was later announced as a weekly NASCAR Whelen All-American Series track starting in 2015. It was the third NASCAR weekly track in Wisconsin after Cedar Lake Speedway and La Crosse Fairgrounds Speedway. The late models were designated NASCAR Division I, Sportsman as Division II, and Bandits as Division III.

==== Entry list ====
- (R) denotes rookie driver.

#	Driver	Team	Make
03	Alex Clubb	Clubb Racing Inc.	Ford
3	Willie Mullins	Mullins Racing	Ford
06	Brayton Laster (R)	Wayne Peterson Racing	Ford
6	Lavar Scott	Rev Racing	Chevrolet
9	Trevor Ward	Fast Track Racing	Toyota
10	Tony Cosentino	Fast Track Racing	Ford
11	Dustin Hillenburg	Fast Track Racing	Ford
12	Matt Kemp	Fast Track Racing	Ford
17	Kaylee Bryson	Cook Racing Technologies	Chevrolet
18	Max Reaves	Joe Gibbs Racing	Toyota
20	Lawless Alan	Venturini Motorsports	Toyota
25	Mason Mitchell	Venturini Motorsports	Toyota
28	Brenden Queen (R)	Pinnacle Racing Group	Chevrolet
31	Quinn Davis	Rise Motorsports	Toyota
48	Brad Smith	Brad Smith Motorsports	Ford
55	Isabella Robusto (R)	Venturini Motorsports	Toyota
67	Shane Backes	Maples Motorsports	Chevrolet
70	Julian DaCosta	Nitro Motorsports	Toyota
82	Tristan McKee	Pinnacle Racing Group	Chevrolet
86	Jeff Maconi	Clubb Racing Inc.	Ford
97	Jason Kitzmiller	CR7 Motorsports	Chevrolet
99	Michael Maples	Maples Motorsports	Chevrolet
Official entry list

== Practice ==
The first and only practice session was held on Friday, August 22, at 3:45 PM CST, and would last for 45 minutes. Tristan McKee, driving for Pinnacle Racing Group, would set the fastest time in the session, with a lap of 18.460, and a speed of 97.508 mph (156.924 km/h).

Pos.	#	Driver	Team	Make	Time	Speed
1	82	Tristan McKee	Pinnacle Racing Group	Chevrolet	18.460	97.508
2	18	Max Reaves	Joe Gibbs Racing	Toyota	18.583	96.863
3	55	Isabella Robusto (R)	Venturini Motorsports	Toyota	18.658	96.473
Full practice results

== Qualifying ==
Qualifying was held on Friday, August 22, at 5:15 PM CST. The qualifying procedure used is a single-car, two-lap based system. Drivers will be on track by themselves and will have two laps to post a qualifying time, and whoever sets the fastest time will win the pole.

Max Reaves, driving for Joe Gibbs Racing, would score the pole for the race, with a lap of 18.453, and a speed of 97.545 mph (156.983 km/h).

=== Qualifying results ===
Pos.	#	Driver	Team	Make	Time	Speed
1	18	Max Reaves	Joe Gibbs Racing	Toyota	18.453	97.545
2	28	Brenden Queen (R)	Pinnacle Racing Group	Chevrolet	18.624	96.649
3	55	Isabella Robusto (R)	Venturini Motorsports	Toyota	18.715	96.180
4	82	Tristan McKee	Pinnacle Racing Group	Chevrolet	18.720	96.154
5	6	Lavar Scott	Rev Racing	Chevrolet	18.725	96.128
6	20	Lawless Alan	Venturini Motorsports	Toyota	18.751	95.995
7	25	Mason Mitchell	Venturini Motorsports	Toyota	18.840	95.541
8	70	Julian DaCosta	Nitro Motorsports	Toyota	18.847	95.506
9	97	Jason Kitzmiller	CR7 Motorsports	Chevrolet	18.979	94.842
10	10	Tony Cosentino	Fast Track Racing	Ford	19.118	94.152
11	17	Kaylee Bryson	Cook Racing Technologies	Chevrolet	19.170	93.897
12	3	Willie Mullins	Mullins Racing	Ford	19.459	92.502
13	12	Matt Kemp	Fast Track Racing	Ford	20.000	90.000
14	99	Michael Maples	Maples Motorsports	Chevrolet	20.059	89.735
15	31	Quinn Davis	Rise Motorsports	Toyota	20.275	88.779
16	03	Alex Clubb	Clubb Racing Inc.	Ford	20.339	88.500
17	9	Trevor Ward	Fast Track Racing	Toyota	20.471	87.929
18	06	Brayton Laster (R)	Wayne Peterson Racing	Ford	20.829	86.418
19	11	Dustin Hillenburg	Fast Track Racing	Ford	20.839	86.377
20	48	Brad Smith	Brad Smith Motorsports	Ford	21.014	85.657
21	67	Shane Backes	Maples Motorsports	Chevrolet	22.107	81.422
22	86	Jeff Maconi	Clubb Racing Inc.	Ford	22.547	79.833
Official qualifying results

== Race results ==
Fin	St	#	Driver	Team	Make	Laps	Led	Status	Pts
1	1	18	Max Reaves	Joe Gibbs Racing	Toyota	200	200	Running	49
2	5	6	Lavar Scott	Rev Racing	Chevrolet	200	0	Running	92
3	2	28	Brenden Queen (R)	Pinnacle Racing Group	Chevrolet	200	0	Running	91
4	3	55	Isabella Robusto (R)	Venturini Motorsports	Toyota	200	0	Running	90
5	8	70	Julian DaCosta	Nitro Motorsports	Toyota	200	0	Running	39
6	7	25	Mason Mitchell	Venturini Motorsports	Toyota	199	0	Running	38
7	9	97	Jason Kitzmiller	CR7 Motorsports	Chevrolet	199	0	Running	87
8	11	17	Kaylee Bryson	Cook Racing Technologies	Chevrolet	198	0	Running	36
9	10	10	Tony Cosentino	Fast Track Racing	Ford	198	0	Running	35
10	12	3	Willie Mullins	Mullins Racing	Ford	197	0	Running	34
11	4	82	Tristan McKee	Pinnacle Racing Group	Chevrolet	196	0	Running	33
12	15	31	Quinn Davis	Rise Motorsports	Toyota	188	0	Running	32
13	16	03	Alex Clubb	Clubb Racing Inc.	Ford	187	0	Running	81
14	18	06	Brayton Laster (R)	Wayne Peterson Racing	Ford	182	0	Running	80
15	14	99	Michael Maples	Maples Motorsports	Chevrolet	182	0	Running	79
16	19	11	Dustin Hillenburg	Fast Track Racing	Ford	178	0	Running	28
17	21	67	Shane Backes	Maples Motorsports	Chevrolet	177	0	Running	27
18	6	20	Lawless Alan	Venturini Motorsports	Toyota	164	0	Running	76
19	20	48	Brad Smith	Brad Smith Motorsports	Ford	127	0	Parked	75
20	22	86	Jeff Maconi	Clubb Racing Inc.	Ford	73	0	Mechanical	24
21	17	9	Trevor Ward	Fast Track Racing	Toyota	11	0	Mechanical	23
22	13	12	Matt Kemp	Fast Track Racing	Ford	5	0	Mechanical	22
Official race results

== Standings after the race ==
Drivers' Championship standings

Pos	Driver	Points
1	Brenden Queen	758
2	Lavar Scott	724 (–34)
3	Lawless Alan	701 (–57)
4	Jason Kitzmiller	636 (–122)
5	Isabella Robusto	626 (–132)
6	Alex Clubb	558 (–200)
7	Michael Maples	537 (–221)
8	Brayton Laster	525 (–233)
9	Brad Smith	401 (–357)
10	Andy Jankowiak	299 (–459)

- Note: Only the first 10 positions are included for the driver standings.

Previous race: 2025 Allen Crowe 100	ARCA Menards Series; 2025 season	Next race: 2025 Southern Illinois 100
