= 2025 Southern Illinois 100 =

16th race of the 2025 ARCA Menards Series

Race details
- Race 16 of 20 of the 2025 ARCA Menards Series
- Date: August 31, 2025
- Official name: 45th Annual Southern Illinois 100
- Location: DuQuoin State Fairgrounds Racetrack in Du Quoin, Illinois
- Course: Permanent racing facility
- Course length: 1 miles (1.6 km)
- Distance: 104 laps, 104 mi (167 km)
- Scheduled distance: 100 laps, 100 mi (160 km)
- Average speed: 70.139 mph (112.878 km/h)

Pole position
Driver	Lawless Alan	Venturini Motorsports
- Time: 34.072

Most laps led
Driver	Brent Crews	Nitro Motorsports
- Laps: 54

Winner
No. 28	Brenden Queen	Pinnacle Racing Group

Television in the United States
- Network: FS1
- Announcers: Eric Brennan and Phil Parsons

Radio in the United States
- Radio: ARCA Racing Network

The 2025 Southern Illinois 100 was the 16th stock car race of the 2025 ARCA Menards Series season, and the 45th iteration of the event. The race was held on Sunday, August 31, 2025, at the DuQuoin State Fairgrounds Racetrack in Du Quoin, Illinois, a 1-mile (1.6 km) permanent oval-shaped dirt track. The race was contested over 104 laps, extended from 100 laps due to late-race restart. In a wild race, Brenden Queen, driving for Pinnacle Racing Group, would take advantage of a late restart, and led the final 22 laps of the event to earn his sixth career ARCA Menards Series win. Brent Crews, the dominant driver of the race, was involved in a late race wreck involving Alex Clubb with eight laps to go, ending his chances at sweeping both dirt races. He retired from the race and was credited with a 15th place finish. To fill out the podium, pole-sitter Lawless Alan, driving for Venturini Motorsports, and Kelly Kovski, driving for his own team, Kelly Kovski Racing, would finish 2nd and 3rd, respectively.

== Report ==
=== Background ===
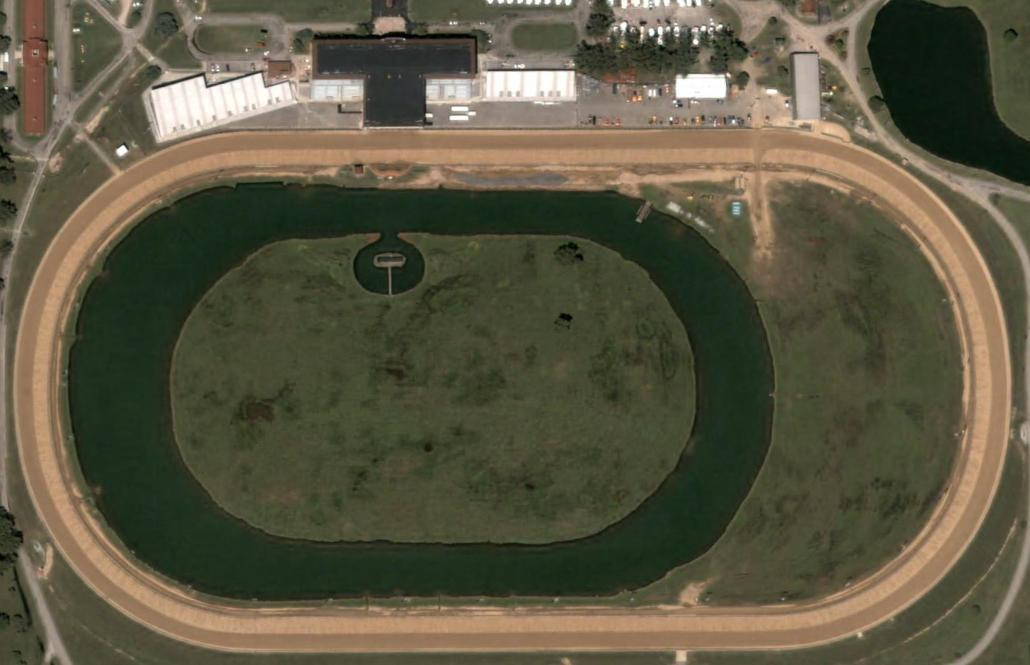
DuQuoin State Fairgrounds Racetrack, the circuit where the race will be held.

DuQuoin State Fairgrounds Racetrack is a one-mile (1.6-km) clay oval motor racetrack in Du Quoin, Illinois, about 90 miles (140 km) southeast of St Louis, Missouri. It is a stop on the ARCA Menards Series, USAC Silver Crown Series and American Flat Track.

The DuQuoin "Magic Mile" racetrack was constructed on reclaimed stripmine land in 1946 by W.R. Hayes. The track's first national championship race was held in September 1948. In the second race on October 10, popular AAA National driving champion Ted Horn was killed in the fourth turn when a spindle on his championship car broke. The national championship race for the USAC Silver Crown dirt cars is held in his honor.

==== Entry list ====
- (R) denotes rookie driver.

#	Driver	Team	Make
03	Alex Clubb	Clubb Racing Inc.	Ford
06	Brayton Laster (R)	Wayne Peterson Racing	Ford
6	Lavar Scott	Rev Racing	Chevrolet
9	Trevor Ward	Fast Track Racing	Toyota
10	Ed Pompa	Fast Track Racing	Ford
11	Tim Monroe	Fast Track Racing	Chevrolet
12	Tony Cosentino	Fast Track Racing	Toyota
16	Kelly Kovski	Kelly Kovski Racing	Chevrolet
18	Max Reaves	Joe Gibbs Racing	Toyota
20	Lawless Alan	Venturini Motorsports	Toyota
25	Jade Avedisian	Venturini Motorsports	Toyota
28	Brenden Queen (R)	Pinnacle Racing Group	Chevrolet
31	Chase Howard	Rise Motorsports	Toyota
48	Brad Smith	Brad Smith Motorsports	Ford
55	Isabella Robusto (R)	Venturini Motorsports	Toyota
67	Ryan Vargas	Maples Motorsports	Chevrolet
70	Brent Crews	Nitro Motorsports	Toyota
86	Josh White	Clubb Racing Inc.	Ford
97	Jason Kitzmiller	CR7 Motorsports	Chevrolet
99	Michael Maples	Maples Motorsports	Chevrolet
Official entry list

== Practice ==
The first and only practice session was held on Sunday, August 31, at 4:30 PM CST, and would last for 30 minutes. Lavar Scott, driving for Rev Racing, would set the fastest time in the session, with a lap of 34.158, and a speed of 105.393 mph (169.614 km/h).

Pos.	#	Driver	Team	Make	Time	Speed
1	6	Lavar Scott	Rev Racing	Chevrolet	34.158	105.393
2	70	Brent Crews	Nitro Motorsports	Toyota	34.336	104.846
3	28	Brenden Queen (R)	Pinnacle Racing Group	Chevrolet	34.435	104.545
Full practice results

== Qualifying ==
Qualifying was held on Sunday, August 31, at 6:00 PM CST. The qualifying procedure used is a single-car, one-lap based system. Drivers will be on track by themselves and will have one lap to post a qualifying time, and whoever sets the fastest time will win the pole.

Lawless Alan, driving for Venturini Motorsports, would score the pole for the race, with a lap of 34.072, and a speed of 105.659 mph (170.042 km/h).

=== Qualifying results ===
Pos.	#	Driver	Team	Make	Time	Speed
1	20	Lawless Alan	Venturini Motorsports	Toyota	34.072	105.659
2	70	Brent Crews	Nitro Motorsports	Toyota	34.176	105.337
3	18	Max Reaves	Joe Gibbs Racing	Toyota	34.267	105.057
4	6	Lavar Scott	Rev Racing	Chevrolet	34.432	104.554
5	28	Brenden Queen (R)	Pinnacle Racing Group	Chevrolet	34.479	104.411
6	16	Kelly Kovski	Kelly Kovski Racing	Chevrolet	34.626	103.968
7	25	Jade Avedisian	Venturini Motorsports	Toyota	34.770	103.538
8	55	Isabella Robusto (R)	Venturini Motorsports	Toyota	35.006	102.840
9	67	Ryan Vargas	Maples Motorsports	Chevrolet	35.073	102.643
10	12	Tony Cosentino	Fast Track Racing	Toyota	35.497	101.417
11	31	Chase Howard	Rise Motorsports	Toyota	35.987	100.036
12	11	Tim Monroe	Fast Track Racing	Chevrolet	36.236	99.349
13	97	Jason Kitzmiller	CR7 Motorsports	Chevrolet	36.336	99.075
14	99	Michael Maples	Maples Motorsports	Chevrolet	36.547	98.503
15	48	Brad Smith	Brad Smith Motorsports	Ford	37.165	96.865
16	06	Brayton Laster (R)	Wayne Peterson Racing	Ford	37.187	96.808
17	9	Trevor Ward	Fast Track Racing	Toyota	37.352	96.380
18	03	Alex Clubb	Clubb Racing Inc.	Ford	37.712	95.460
19	10	Ed Pompa	Fast Track Racing	Ford	38.515	93.470
20	86	Josh White	Clubb Racing Inc.	Ford	42.861	83.992
Official qualifying results

== Race results ==
Fin	St	#	Driver	Team	Make	Laps	Led	Status	Pts
1	5	28	Brenden Queen (R)	Pinnacle Racing Group	Chevrolet	104	22	Running	47
2	1	20	Lawless Alan	Venturini Motorsports	Toyota	104	0	Running	43
3	6	16	Kelly Kovski	Kely Kovski Racing	Chevrolet	104	0	Running	41
4	8	55	Isabella Robusto (R)	Venturini Motorsports	Toyota	104	0	Running	40
5	12	11	Tim Monroe	Fast Track Racing	Chevrolet	104	0	Running	39
6	4	6	Lavar Scott	Rev Racing	Chevrolet	104	8	Running	39
7	11	31	Chase Howard	Rise Motorsports	Toyota	104	0	Running	37
8	10	12	Tony Cosentino	Fast Track Racing	Toyota	104	0	Running	36
9	14	99	Michael Maples	Maples Motorsports	Chevrolet	104	0	Running	35
10	3	18	Max Reaves	Joe Gibbs Racing	Toyota	103	20	Running	35
11	18	03	Alex Clubb	Clubb Racing Inc.	Ford	101	0	Running	33
12	19	10	Ed Pompa	Fast Track Racing	Ford	100	0	Running	32
13	16	06	Brayton Laster (R)	Wayne Peterson Racing	Ford	99	0	Running	31
14	13	97	Jason Kitzmiller	CR7 Motorsports	Chevrolet	98	0	Running	30
15	2	70	Brent Crews	Nitro Motorsports	Toyota	93	54	Accident	31
16	15	48	Brad Smith	Brad Smith Motorsports	Ford	72	0	Mechanical	28
17	7	25	Jade Avedisian	Venturini Motorsports	Toyota	67	0	Accident	27
18	9	67	Ryan Vargas	Maples Motorsports	Chevrolet	16	0	Mechanical	26
19	20	86	Josh White	Clubb Racing Inc.	Ford	12	0	Mechanical	25
20	17	9	Trevor Ward	Fast Track Racing	Toyota	4	0	Mechanical	24
Official race results

== Standings after the race ==
Drivers' Championship standings

	Pos	Driver	Points
	1	Brenden Queen	805
	2	Lavar Scott	763 (–42)
	3	Lawless Alan	744 (–61)
1	4	Isabella Robusto	666 (–139)
1	5	Jason Kitzmiller	666 (–139)
	6	Alex Clubb	591 (–214)
	7	Michael Maples	572 (–233)
	8	Brayton Laster	556 (–249)
	9	Brad Smith	429 (–376)
2	10	Brent Crews	316 (–489)

- Note: Only the first 10 positions are included for the driver standings.

Previous race: 2025 Badger 200	ARCA Menards Series; 2025 season	Next race: 2025 Bush's Beans 200
