= 2025 Allen Crowe 100 =

14th race of the 2025 ARCA Menards Series

Race details
- Race 14 of 20 of the 2025 ARCA Menards Series
- Date: August 17, 2025
- Official name: 43rd Annual Allen Crowe 100
- Location: Illinois State Fairgrounds Racetrack in Springfield, Illinois
- Course: Permanent racing facility
- Course length: 1 miles (1.6 km)
- Distance: 100 laps, 100 mi (160 km)
- Scheduled distance: 100 laps, 100 mi (160 km)
- Average speed: 66.007 mph (106.228 km/h)

Pole position
Driver	Brenden Queen	Pinnacle Racing Group
- Grid positions set by competition-based formula

Most laps led
Driver	Brent Crews	Nitro Motorsports
- Laps: 83

Winner
No. 70	Brent Crews	Nitro Motorsports

Television in the United States
- Network: FS1
- Announcers: Brent Stover and Phil Parsons

Radio in the United States
- Radio: ARCA Racing Network

The 2025 Allen Crowe 100 was the 14th stock car race of the 2025 ARCA Menards Series season, and the 43rd iteration of the event. The race was held on Sunday, August 17, 2025, at the Illinois State Fairgrounds Racetrack in Springfield, Illinois, a 1-mile (1.6 km) permanent oval-shaped dirt track. The race took the scheduled 100 laps to complete. Brent Crews, driving for Nitro Motorsports, was able to take the lead early from Brenden Queen, and showed off his dirt racing background by leading the final 83 laps to earn his fifth career ARCA Menards Series win, and his third of the season. To fill out the podium, Lavar Scott, driving for Rev Racing, and Kelly Kovski, driving for his own team, Kelly Kovski Racing, would finish 2nd and 3rd, respectively.

== Report ==
=== Background ===
Illinois State Fairgrounds Racetrack is a one mile long clay oval motor racetrack on the Illinois State Fairgrounds in Springfield, the state capital. It is frequently nicknamed The Springfield Mile. Constructed in the late 19th century and reconstructed in 1927, the track has hosted competitive auto racing since 1910, making it one of the oldest speedways in the United States. The original mile track utilized the current frontstretch and the other side was behind the current grandstands and the straightaways were connected by tight turns. It is the oldest track to continually host national championship dirt track racing, holding its first national championship race in 1934 under the American Automobile Association banner. It is the home of five world records for automobile racing, making it one of the fastest dirt tracks in the world. Since 1993, the venue is managed by Bob Sargent's Track Enterprises.

The Illinois State Fair mile currently hosts the Allen Crowe Memorial 100 ARCA stock car race, USAC Silver Crown dirt cars, UMP Late Models and Modifieds and the A.M.A. Grand National Championship. The only driver who has won races in three disciplines of racing in Ken Schrader who won in ARCA cars (1998), UMP Modifieds (1998), and midgets.

==== Entry list ====
- (R) denotes rookie driver.

#	Driver	Team	Make
03	Alex Clubb	Clubb Racing Inc.	Ford
06	Brayton Laster (R)	Wayne Peterson Racing	Ford
6	Lavar Scott	Rev Racing	Chevrolet
8	Sean Corr	Empire Racing	Chevrolet
9	Trevor Ward	Fast Track Racing	Toyota
10	Tony Cosentino	Fast Track Racing	Toyota
11	Tim Monroe	Fast Track Racing	Chevrolet
12	Matt Kemp	Fast Track Racing	Ford
16	Kelly Kovski	Kelly Kovski Racing	Chevrolet
18	Max Reaves	Joe Gibbs Racing	Toyota
20	Lawless Alan	Venturini Motorsports	Toyota
25	Sam Corry	Venturini Motorsports	Toyota
28	Brenden Queen (R)	Pinnacle Racing Group	Chevrolet
31	Tim Goulet	Rise Motorsports	Toyota
48	Brad Smith	Brad Smith Motorsports	Ford
55	Isabella Robusto (R)	Venturini Motorsports	Toyota
67	Austin Vaughn	Maples Motorsports	Chevrolet
70	Brent Crews	Nitro Motorsports	Toyota
86	Joe Cooksey	Clubb Racing Inc.	Ford
97	Jason Kitzmiller	CR7 Motorsports	Chevrolet
99	Michael Maples	Maples Motorsports	Chevrolet
Official entry list

== Starting lineup ==
Practice and qualifying were originally scheduled to be held on Sunday, August 17, at 10:00 AM and 11:15 AM CST, but were both cancelled due to inclement weather. The starting lineup would be determined by this season's owners' points. As a result, Brenden Queen, driving for Pinnacle Racing Group, was awarded the pole.

=== Starting lineup ===
Pos.	#	Driver	Team	Make
1	28	Brenden Queen (R)	Pinnacle Racing Group	Chevrolet
2	18	Max Reaves	Joe Gibbs Racing	Toyota
3	20	Lawless Alan	Venturini Motorsports	Toyota
4	6	Lavar Scott	Rev Racing	Chevrolet
5	25	Sam Corry	Venturini Motorsports	Toyota
6	70	Brent Crews	Nitro Motorsports	Toyota
7	97	Jason Kitzmiller	CR7 Motorsports	Chevrolet
8	55	Isabella Robusto (R)	Venturini Motorsports	Toyota
9	11	Tim Monroe	Fast Track Racing	Chevrolet
10	03	Alex Clubb	Clubb Racing Inc.	Ford
11	99	Michael Maples	Maples Motorsports	Chevrolet
12	06	Brayton Laster (R)	Wayne Peterson Racing	Ford
13	10	Tony Cosentino	Fast Track Racing	Toyota
14	67	Austin Vaughn	Maples Motorsports	Chevrolet
15	48	Brad Smith	Brad Smith Motorsports	Ford
16	9	Trevor Ward	Fast Track Racing	Toyota
17	12	Matt Kemp	Fast Track Racing	Ford
18	86	Joe Cooksey	Clubb Racing Inc.	Ford
19	31	Tim Goulet	Rise Motorsports	Toyota
20	8	Sean Corr	Empire Racing	Chevrolet
21	16	Kelly Kovski	Kelly Kovski Racing	Chevrolet
Official starting lineup

== Race results ==
Fin	St	#	Driver	Team	Make	Laps	Led	Status	Pts
1	6	70	Brent Crews	Nitro Motorsports	Toyota	100	83	Running	48
2	4	6	Lavar Scott	Rev Racing	Chevrolet	100	0	Running	42
3	21	16	Kelly Kovski	Kelly Kovski Racing	Chevrolet	100	0	Running	41
4	1	28	Brenden Queen (R)	Pinnacle Racing Group	Chevrolet	100	17	Running	41
5	20	8	Sean Corr	Empire Racing	Chevrolet	100	0	Running	39
6	2	18	Max Reaves	Joe Gibbs Racing	Toyota	100	0	Running	38
7	12	06	Brayton Laster (R)	Wayne Peterson Racing	Ford	100	0	Running	37
8	10	03	Alex Clubb	Clubb Racing Inc.	Ford	97	0	Running	36
9	15	48	Brad Smith	Brad Smith Motorsports	Ford	95	0	Running	35
10	7	97	Jason Kitzmiller	CR7 Motorsports	Chevrolet	95	0	Running	34
11	13	10	Tony Cosentino	Fast Track Racing	Toyota	93	0	Running	33
12	9	11	Tim Monroe	Fast Track Racing	Chevrolet	88	0	Accident	32
13	5	25	Sam Corry	Venturini Motorsports	Toyota	88	0	Accident	31
14	18	86	Joe Cooksey	Clubb Racing Inc.	Ford	51	0	Mechanical	30
15	11	99	Michael Maples	Maples Motorsports	Chevrolet	48	0	Mechanical	29
16	19	31	Tim Goulet	Rise Motorsports	Toyota	28	0	Mechanical	28
17	16	9	Trevor Ward	Fast Track Racing	Toyota	23	0	Mechanical	27
18	17	12	Matt Kemp	Fast Track Racing	Ford	21	0	Mechanical	26
19	14	67	Austin Vaughn	Maples Motorsports	Chevrolet	20	0	Mechanical	25
20	3	20	Lawless Alan	Venturini Motorsports	Toyota	19	0	Accident	24
21	8	55	Isabella Robusto (R)	Venturini Motorsports	Toyota	10	0	Accident	23
Official race results

== Standings after the race ==
Drivers' Championship standings

	Pos	Driver	Points
	1	Brenden Queen	666
1	2	Lavar Scott	632 (–34)
1	3	Lawless Alan	625 (–41)
	4	Jason Kitzmiller	549 (–117)
	5	Isabella Robusto	536 (–130)
	6	Alex Clubb	477 (–189)
	7	Michael Maples	458 (–208)
	8	Brayton Laster	445 (–221)
1	9	Brad Smith	326 (–340)
1	10	Andy Jankowiak	299 (–367)

- Note: Only the first 10 positions are included for the driver standings.

Previous race: 2025 General Tire 100 at The Glen	ARCA Menards Series; 2025 season	Next race: 2025 Badger 200
