= Trevor Ward =

Trevor Ward may refer to:

- Trevor Ward (cricketer), English cricketer
- Trevor Ward (racing driver) (born ?), American stock car racing driver
- Trevor Ward (racing driver, born 2004), American stock car racing driver
