= 2025 Kentuckiana Ford Dealers ARCA 200 =

18th race of the 2025 ARCA Menards Series

Race details
- Race 18 of 20 of the 2025 ARCA Menards Series
- Date: September 20, 2025
- Official name: 28th Annual Kentuckiana Ford Dealers ARCA 200
- Location: Salem Speedway in Salem, Indiana
- Course: Permanent racing facility
- Course length: 0.555 miles (0.893 km)
- Distance: 200 laps, 111 mi (178 km)
- Scheduled distance: 200 laps, 111 mi (178 km)
- Average speed: 90.963 mph (146.391 km/h)

Pole position
Driver	Max Reaves	Joe Gibbs Racing
- Time: 17.301

Most laps led
Driver	Max Reaves	Joe Gibbs Racing
- Laps: 111

Winner
No. 28	Brenden Queen	Pinnacle Racing Group

Television in the United States
- Network: FS2
- Announcers: Eric Brennan and Phil Parsons

Radio in the United States
- Radio: ARCA Racing Network

The 2025 Kentuckiana Ford Dealers ARCA 200 was the 18th stock car race of the 2025 ARCA Menards Series season, and the 28th iteration of the event. The race was held on Saturday, September 20, 2025, at Salem Speedway in Salem, Indiana, a 0.555 miles (0.893 km) permanent oval-shaped racetrack. The race took the scheduled 200 laps to complete. Brenden Queen, driving for Pinnacle Racing Group, would take advantage of a late restart, and led the final 23 laps of the race to earn his seventh career ARCA Menards Series win. To fill out the podium, Andrew Patterson, driving for Nitro Motorsports, and Leland Honeyman, driving for Venturini Motorsports, would finish 2nd and 3rd, respectively.

Max Reaves dominated the majority of the event, after leading a race-high 111 laps from the pole position, but lost the lead to Lavar Scott before the second halfway break. Scott led a career-high 66 laps before losing the lead after a late-race caution that took out Reaves. Queen executed on the final restart and led the final 23 laps to win. Scott suffered damage after hitting the wall, and fell back to finish fourth.

== Report ==
=== Background ===
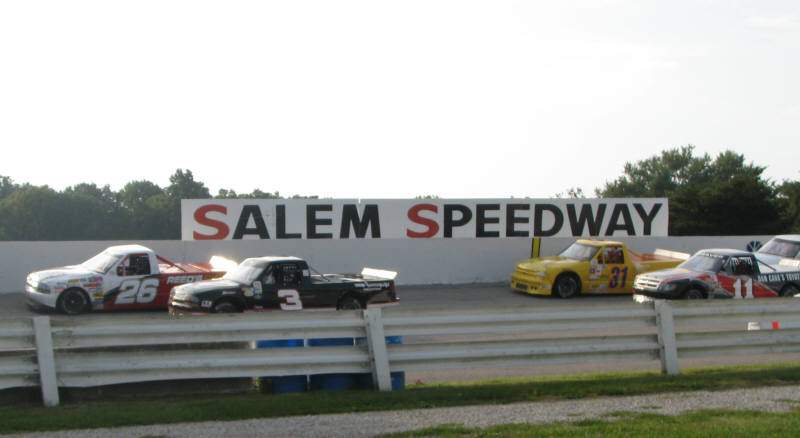
Salem Speedway, the track where the race will be held.

Salem Speedway is a .555-mile (0.893 km) long paved oval racetrack in Washington Township, Washington County, near Salem, Indiana, United States, approximately 100 miles (160 km) south of Indianapolis. The track has 33° degrees of banking in the corners. Major auto racing series that run at Salem are ARCA and USAC.

==== Entry list ====
- (R) denotes rookie driver.

#	Driver	Team	Make
03	Chris Golden	Clubb Racing Inc.	Ford
06	Brayton Laster (R)	Wayne Peterson Racing	Toyota
6	Lavar Scott	Rev Racing	Chevrolet
9	Matt Kemp	Fast Track Racing	Toyota
10	Ed Pompa	Fast Track Racing	Ford
11	Tony Cosentino	Fast Track Racing	Ford
12	Mike Basham	Fast Track Racing	Toyota
18	Max Reaves	Joe Gibbs Racing	Toyota
20	Leland Honeyman	Venturini Motorsports	Toyota
25	Mason Mitchell	Venturini Motorsports	Toyota
28	Brenden Queen (R)	Pinnacle Racing Group	Chevrolet
31	Chase Howard	Rise Motorsports	Toyota
48	Brad Smith	Brad Smith Motorsports	Ford
55	Isabella Robusto (R)	Venturini Motorsports	Toyota
67	Ryan Vargas	Maples Motorsports	Chevrolet
69	Will Kimmel	Kimmel Racing	Ford
70	Andrew Patterson	Nitro Motorsports	Toyota
86	Alex Clubb	Clubb Racing Inc.	Ford
95	Conner Popplewell	MAN Motorsports	Toyota
97	Jason Kitzmiller	CR7 Motorsports	Chevrolet
99	Michael Maples	Maples Motorsports	Chevrolet
Official entry list

== Practice ==
The first and only practice session was held on Saturday, September 20, at 3:45 PM EST, and would last for 45 minutes. Lavar Scott, driving for Rev Racing, would set the fastest time in the session, with a lap of 17.342, and a speed of 115.212 mph (185.416 km/h).

Pos.	#	Driver	Team	Make	Time	Speed
1	6	Lavar Scott	Rev Racing	Chevrolet	17.342	115.212
2	18	Max Reaves	Joe Gibbs Racing	Toyota	17.397	114.847
3	55	Isabella Robusto (R)	Venturini Motorsports	Toyota	17.578	113.665
Full practice results

== Qualifying ==
Qualifying was held on Saturday, September 20, at 5:15 PM EST. The qualifying procedure used is a single-car, two-lap system with one round. Drivers will be on track by themselves and will have two laps to post a qualifying time, and whoever sets the fastest time will win the pole.

Max Reaves, driving for Joe Gibbs Racing, would score the pole for the race, with a lap of 17.301, and a speed of 115.485 mph (185.855 km/h).

=== Qualifying results ===
Pos.	#	Driver	Team	Make	Time	Speed
1	18	Max Reaves	Joe Gibbs Racing	Toyota	17.301	115.485
2	6	Lavar Scott	Rev Racing	Chevrolet	17.357	115.112
3	28	Brenden Queen (R)	Pinnacle Racing Group	Chevrolet	17.427	114.650
4	70	Andrew Patterson	Nitro Motorsports	Toyota	17.430	114.630
5	20	Leland Honeyman	Venturini Motorsports	Toyota	17.503	114.152
6	55	Isabella Robusto (R)	Venturini Motorsports	Toyota	17.564	113.755
7	95	Conner Popplewell	MAN Motorsports	Toyota	17.573	113.697
8	69	Will Kimmel	Kimmel Racing	Ford	17.576	113.678
9	25	Mason Mitchell	Venturini Motorsports	Toyota	17.678	113.022
10	97	Jason Kitzmiller	CR7 Motorsports	Chevrolet	17.699	112.888
11	11	Tony Cosentino	Fast Track Racing	Ford	18.215	109.690
12	67	Ryan Vargas	Maples Motorsports	Chevrolet	18.340	108.942
13	10	Ed Pompa	Fast Track Racing	Ford	18.974	105.302
14	9	Matt Kemp	Fast Track Racing	Toyota	19.014	105.080
15	12	Mike Basham	Fast Track Racing	Toyota	19.157	104.296
16	31	Chase Howard	Rise Motorsports	Toyota	19.278	103.641
17	06	Brayton Laster (R)	Wayne Peterson Racing	Toyota	19.783	100.996
18	86	Alex Clubb	Clubb Racing Inc.	Ford	19.805	100.884
19	99	Michael Maples	Maples Motorsports	Chevrolet	20.223	98.798
20	48	Brad Smith	Brad Smith Motorsports	Ford	–	–
21	03	Chris Golden	Clubb Racing Inc.	Ford	–	–
Official qualifying results

== Race results ==
Fin	St	#	Driver	Team	Make	Laps	Led	Status	Pts
1	3	28	Brenden Queen (R)	Pinnacle Racing Group	Chevrolet	200	23	Running	47
2	4	70	Andrew Patterson	Nitro Motorsports	Toyota	200	0	Running	42
3	5	20	Leland Honeyman	Venturini Motorsports	Toyota	200	0	Running	41
4	2	6	Lavar Scott	Rev Racing	Chevrolet	200	66	Running	41
5	6	55	Isabella Robusto (R)	Venturini Motorsports	Toyota	200	0	Running	39
6	9	25	Mason Mitchell	Venturini Motorsports	Toyota	200	0	Running	38
7	8	69	Will Kimmel	Kimmel Racing	Ford	200	0	Running	37
8	7	95	Conner Popplewell	MAN Motorsports	Toyota	199	0	Running	36
9	11	11	Tony Cosentino	Fast Track Racing	Ford	196	0	Running	35
10	12	67	Ryan Vargas	Maples Motorsports	Chevrolet	195	0	Running	34
11	10	97	Jason Kitzmiller	CR7 Motorsports	Chevrolet	193	0	Running	33
12	15	12	Mike Basham	Fast Track Racing	Toyota	189	0	Running	32
13	16	31	Chase Howard	Rise Motorsports	Toyota	185	0	Running	31
14	13	10	Ed Pompa	Fast Track Racing	Ford	184	0	Running	30
15	19	99	Michael Maples	Maples Motorsports	Chevrolet	181	0	Running	29
16	17	06	Brayton Laster (R)	Wayne Peterson Racing	Toyota	176	0	Running	28
17	20	48	Brad Smith	Brad Smith Motorsports	Ford	174	0	Running	27
18	1	18	Max Reaves	Joe Gibbs Racing	Toyota	173	111	Accident	29
19	18	86	Alex Clubb	Clubb Racing Inc.	Ford	145	0	Running	25
20	14	9	Matt Kemp	Fast Track Racing	Toyota	18	0	Mechanical	24
21	21	03	Chris Golden	Clubb Racing Inc.	Ford	14	0	Mechanical	23
Official race results

== Standings after the race ==
Drivers' Championship standings

Pos	Driver	Points
1	Brenden Queen	893
2	Lavar Scott	837 (–56)
3	Lawless Alan	744 (–149)
4	Jason Kitzmiller	734 (–159)
5	Isabella Robusto	722 (–171)
6	Alex Clubb	639 (–254)
7	Michael Maples	625 (–268)
8	Brayton Laster	599 (–294)
9	Brad Smith	478 (–415)
10	Brent Crews	364 (–529)

- Note: Only the first 10 positions are included for the driver standings.

Previous race: 2025 Bush's Beans 200	ARCA Menards Series; 2025 season	Next race: 2025 Reese's 150
