= 2025 ARCA Menards Series =

73rd season of the ARCA Menards Series

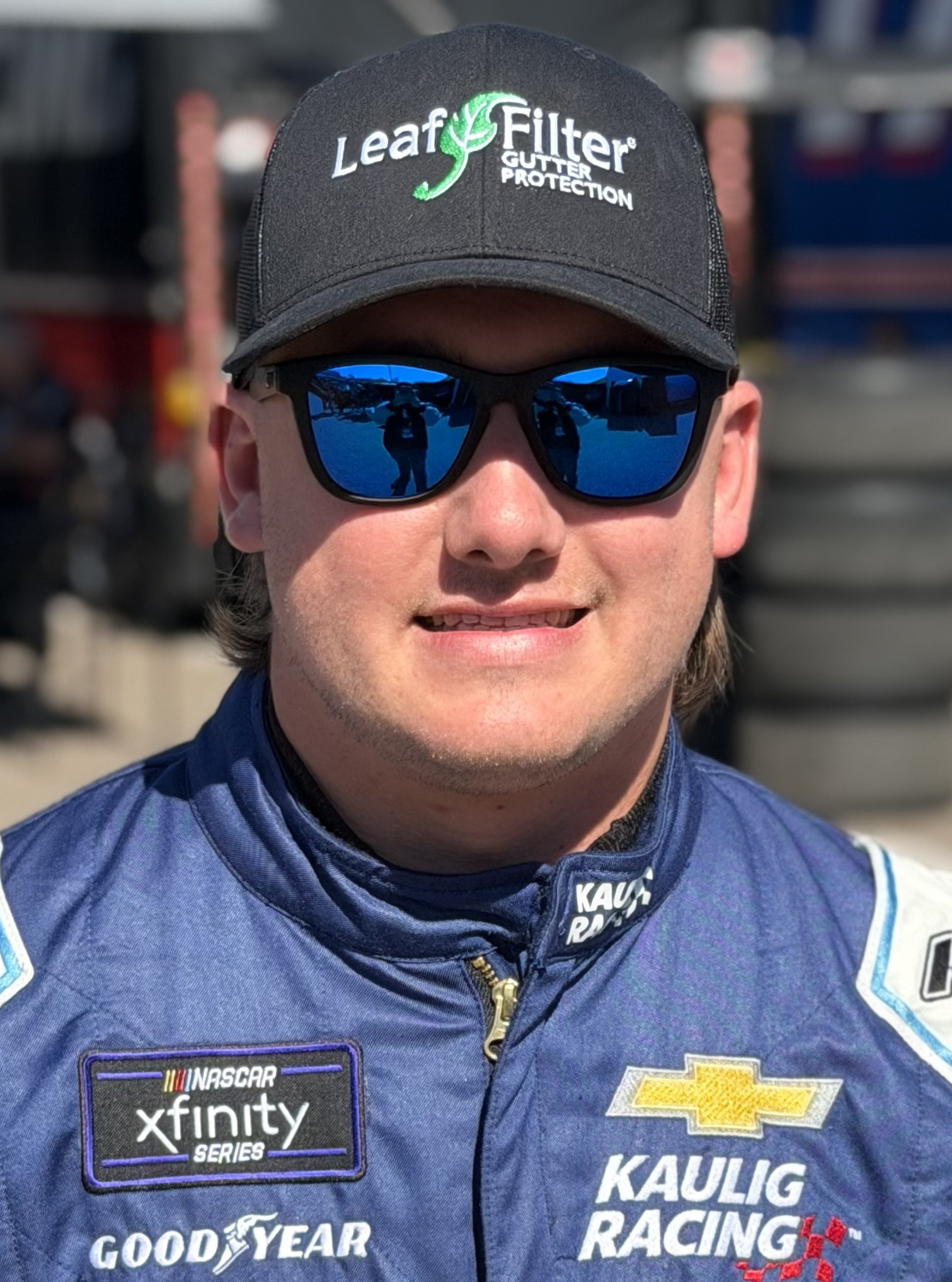
Brenden Queen, the 2025 ARCA Menards Series champion.

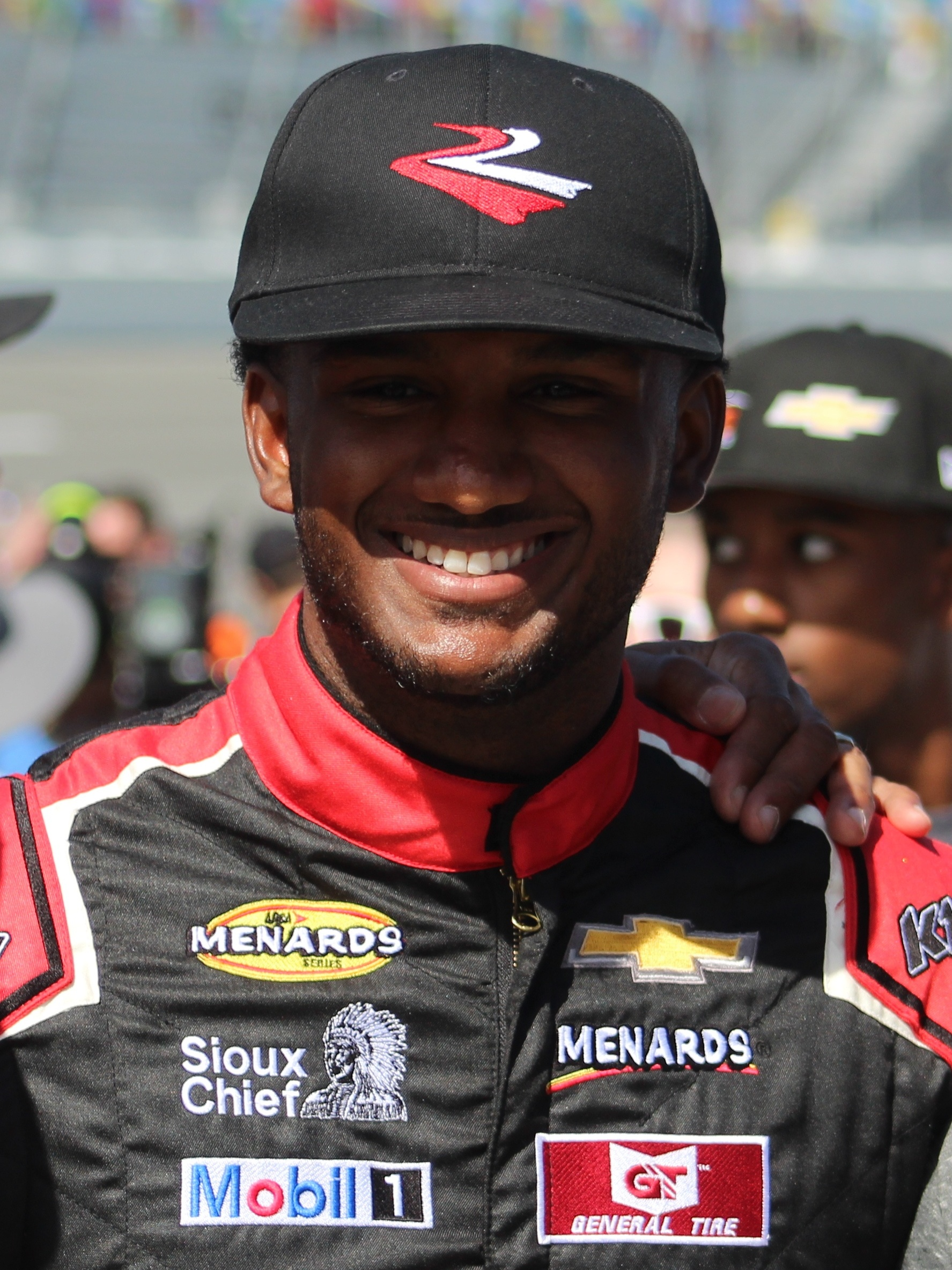
Lavar Scott finished second behind Queen in the championship. It was his second straight second-place finish in the standings.

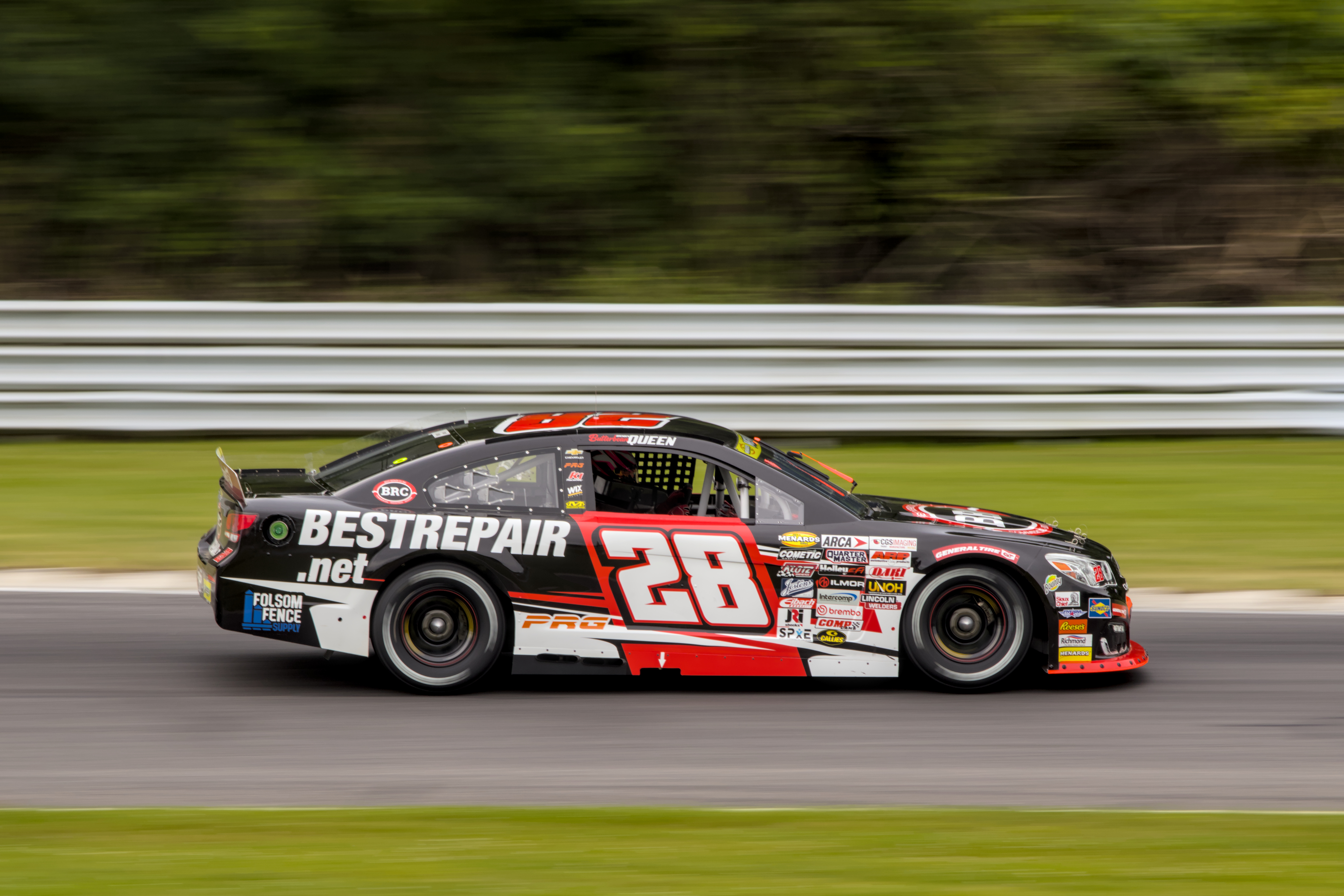
The No. 28 car of Pinnacle Racing Group won the owners' championship.

The 2025 ARCA Menards Series was the 73rd season of the ARCA Menards Series, a stock car racing series sanctioned by NASCAR in the United States. The season began at Daytona International Speedway with the Ride the 'Dente 200 on February 15 and ended with the Owens Corning 200 at Toledo Speedway on October 4.

Andrés Pérez de Lara entered the season as the defending champion, but did not return to defend his title as he moved up to the NASCAR Craftsman Truck Series full-time in 2025, driving for Spire Motorsports and Niece Motorsports. At the conclusion of the season finale at Toledo, Brenden Queen of Pinnacle Racing Group won the championship.

== Teams and drivers ==
Note: If a driver is listed as their own crew chief for a particular race, that means that their entry in that race was a start and park.

=== Complete schedule ===
Manufacturer	Team	No.	Driver	Crew Chief	Ref
Chevrolet	CR7 Motorsports	97	Jason Kitzmiller 19 (Note: Jason Kitzmiller ran the full season split between the CR7 Motorsports No. 97 and ACR Motorsports No. 79 cars.)	Frank Kimmel	
Chevrolet	CR7 Motorsports	97	Grant Enfinger 1	Frank Kimmel	
Chevrolet	Maples Motorsports	99	Michael Maples	Jeremy Petty 16; Kyle Totman 4	
Chevrolet	Pinnacle Racing Group	28	Brenden Queen (R)	Steven Dawson	
Chevrolet	Rev Racing	6	Lavar Scott	Glenn Parker	
Ford	Clubb Racing Inc.	03	Alex Clubb 16 (Note: Clubb ran the full season split between the Clubb Racing Inc. Nos. 03 and 86 cars.)	Brian Clubb 17; Tony Blowers 3	
Ford	Clubb Racing Inc.	03	Josh White 1	Brian Clubb 17; Tony Blowers 3	
Ford	Clubb Racing Inc.	03	Chris Golden 1	Brian Clubb 17; Tony Blowers 3	
Ford	Clubb Racing Inc.	03	Jeff Maconi 2	Brian Clubb 17; Tony Blowers 3	
Toyota	Joe Gibbs Racing	18	William Sawalich 4	Matt Ross	
Toyota	Joe Gibbs Racing	18	Brent Crews 7	Matt Ross	
Toyota	Joe Gibbs Racing	18	Gio Ruggiero 2	Matt Ross	
Toyota	Joe Gibbs Racing	18	Max Reaves 7	Matt Ross	
Toyota	Venturini Motorsports	20	Lawless Alan 16	Kevin Reed Jr.	
Toyota	Venturini Motorsports	20	Leland Honeyman 3	Kevin Reed Jr.	
Toyota	Venturini Motorsports	20	Julian DaCosta 1	Kevin Reed Jr.	
Toyota	Venturini Motorsports	25	Jake Finch 3	Shannon Rursch 4 Jamie Jones 8 Larry Balsitis 6 Danny Johnson 1	
Toyota	Venturini Motorsports	25	Patrick Staropoli 3	Shannon Rursch 4 Jamie Jones 8 Larry Balsitis 6 Danny Johnson 1	
Toyota	Venturini Motorsports	25	Mason Mitchell 7	Shannon Rursch 4 Jamie Jones 8 Larry Balsitis 6 Danny Johnson 1	
Toyota	Venturini Motorsports	25	Corey Heim 1	Shannon Rursch 4 Jamie Jones 8 Larry Balsitis 6 Danny Johnson 1	
Toyota	Venturini Motorsports	25	Ty Fredrickson 1	Shannon Rursch 4 Jamie Jones 8 Larry Balsitis 6 Danny Johnson 1	
Toyota	Venturini Motorsports	25	Alon Day 2	Shannon Rursch 4 Jamie Jones 8 Larry Balsitis 6 Danny Johnson 1	
Toyota	Venturini Motorsports	25	Sam Corry 1	Shannon Rursch 4 Jamie Jones 8 Larry Balsitis 6 Danny Johnson 1	
Toyota	Venturini Motorsports	25	Jade Avedisian 1	Shannon Rursch 4 Jamie Jones 8 Larry Balsitis 6 Danny Johnson 1	
Toyota	Venturini Motorsports	25	Taylor Reimer 1	Shannon Rursch 4 Jamie Jones 8 Larry Balsitis 6 Danny Johnson 1	
Toyota	Venturini Motorsports	55	Isabella Robusto (R)	Larry Balsitis 9 Danny Johnson 10; Shannon Rursch 1	
Chevrolet 1 Ford 19	Scofield Motorsports 1 (Note: It was a Scofield Motorsports entry using Brad Smith Motorsports's owner points.); Brad Smith Motorsports 19	48	Jeff Scofield 1	Brian Finney 1 Gary Sevenans 12; Terry Strange 3 Jeff Smith 4	
Chevrolet 1 Ford 19	Scofield Motorsports 1 Brad Smith Motorsports 19	48	Brad Smith 19	Brian Finney 1 Gary Sevenans 12; Terry Strange 3 Jeff Smith 4	
Toyota 1 Ford 19	City Garage Motorsports 2 (Note: It was a City Garage Motorsports entry using Clubb Racing Inc.'s owner points.); Clubb Racing Inc. 18	86	Becca Monopoli 2	Tom Monopoli 2 Robert Clubb 1 Alex Clubb 2 Shawn Whitfeld 6 Mason Dixon 1 Joe Phelps 1 Chris Golden 1 Tony Blowers 3 Brian Clubb 3	
Toyota 1 Ford 19	City Garage Motorsports 2 Clubb Racing Inc. 18	86	Alex Malycke 1	Tom Monopoli 2 Robert Clubb 1 Alex Clubb 2 Shawn Whitfeld 6 Mason Dixon 1 Joe Phelps 1 Chris Golden 1 Tony Blowers 3 Brian Clubb 3	
Toyota 1 Ford 19	City Garage Motorsports 2 Clubb Racing Inc. 18	86	Brian Clubb 2	Tom Monopoli 2 Robert Clubb 1 Alex Clubb 2 Shawn Whitfeld 6 Mason Dixon 1 Joe Phelps 1 Chris Golden 1 Tony Blowers 3 Brian Clubb 3	
Toyota 1 Ford 19	City Garage Motorsports 2 Clubb Racing Inc. 18	86	Casey Carden 2	Tom Monopoli 2 Robert Clubb 1 Alex Clubb 2 Shawn Whitfeld 6 Mason Dixon 1 Joe Phelps 1 Chris Golden 1 Tony Blowers 3 Brian Clubb 3	
Toyota 1 Ford 19	City Garage Motorsports 2 Clubb Racing Inc. 18	86	Jeff Maconi 3	Tom Monopoli 2 Robert Clubb 1 Alex Clubb 2 Shawn Whitfeld 6 Mason Dixon 1 Joe Phelps 1 Chris Golden 1 Tony Blowers 3 Brian Clubb 3	
Toyota 1 Ford 19	City Garage Motorsports 2 Clubb Racing Inc. 18	86	Chris Golden 1	Tom Monopoli 2 Robert Clubb 1 Alex Clubb 2 Shawn Whitfeld 6 Mason Dixon 1 Joe Phelps 1 Chris Golden 1 Tony Blowers 3 Brian Clubb 3	
Toyota 1 Ford 19	City Garage Motorsports 2 Clubb Racing Inc. 18	86	Corey Aiken 1	Tom Monopoli 2 Robert Clubb 1 Alex Clubb 2 Shawn Whitfeld 6 Mason Dixon 1 Joe Phelps 1 Chris Golden 1 Tony Blowers 3 Brian Clubb 3	
Toyota 1 Ford 19	City Garage Motorsports 2 Clubb Racing Inc. 18	86	Doug Miller 1	Tom Monopoli 2 Robert Clubb 1 Alex Clubb 2 Shawn Whitfeld 6 Mason Dixon 1 Joe Phelps 1 Chris Golden 1 Tony Blowers 3 Brian Clubb 3	
Toyota 1 Ford 19	City Garage Motorsports 2 Clubb Racing Inc. 18	86	Colby Evans 1	Tom Monopoli 2 Robert Clubb 1 Alex Clubb 2 Shawn Whitfeld 6 Mason Dixon 1 Joe Phelps 1 Chris Golden 1 Tony Blowers 3 Brian Clubb 3	
Toyota 1 Ford 19	City Garage Motorsports 2 Clubb Racing Inc. 18	86	Joe Cooksey 1	Tom Monopoli 2 Robert Clubb 1 Alex Clubb 2 Shawn Whitfeld 6 Mason Dixon 1 Joe Phelps 1 Chris Golden 1 Tony Blowers 3 Brian Clubb 3	
Toyota 1 Ford 19	City Garage Motorsports 2 Clubb Racing Inc. 18	86	Josh White 1	Tom Monopoli 2 Robert Clubb 1 Alex Clubb 2 Shawn Whitfeld 6 Mason Dixon 1 Joe Phelps 1 Chris Golden 1 Tony Blowers 3 Brian Clubb 3	
Toyota 1 Ford 19	City Garage Motorsports 2 Clubb Racing Inc. 18	86	Alex Clubb 4	Tom Monopoli 2 Robert Clubb 1 Alex Clubb 2 Shawn Whitfeld 6 Mason Dixon 1 Joe Phelps 1 Chris Golden 1 Tony Blowers 3 Brian Clubb 3	
Ford 3 Toyota 15 Chevrolet 1	Fast Track Racing 19; Rev Racing 1 (Note: It was a Rev Racing entry using Fast Track Racing's owner points.)	9	Jason White 1	Steven Barton 1 Chris Vanscoy 1 Mike Sroufe 2 Dick Doheny 2 Joseth Carabantes 5 Andrew Kiernan 3 Ron Swiecki Jr. 3 Derek Peebles 1 Trevor Ward 1	
Ford 3 Toyota 15 Chevrolet 1	Fast Track Racing 19; Rev Racing 1	9	Tony Cosentino 1	Steven Barton 1 Chris Vanscoy 1 Mike Sroufe 2 Dick Doheny 2 Joseth Carabantes 5 Andrew Kiernan 3 Ron Swiecki Jr. 3 Derek Peebles 1 Trevor Ward 1	
Ford 3 Toyota 15 Chevrolet 1	Fast Track Racing 19; Rev Racing 1	9	Cody Dennison 2	Steven Barton 1 Chris Vanscoy 1 Mike Sroufe 2 Dick Doheny 2 Joseth Carabantes 5 Andrew Kiernan 3 Ron Swiecki Jr. 3 Derek Peebles 1 Trevor Ward 1	
Ford 3 Toyota 15 Chevrolet 1	Fast Track Racing 19; Rev Racing 1	9	Presley Sorah 1	Steven Barton 1 Chris Vanscoy 1 Mike Sroufe 2 Dick Doheny 2 Joseth Carabantes 5 Andrew Kiernan 3 Ron Swiecki Jr. 3 Derek Peebles 1 Trevor Ward 1	
Ford 3 Toyota 15 Chevrolet 1	Fast Track Racing 19; Rev Racing 1	9	Nate Moeller 2	Steven Barton 1 Chris Vanscoy 1 Mike Sroufe 2 Dick Doheny 2 Joseth Carabantes 5 Andrew Kiernan 3 Ron Swiecki Jr. 3 Derek Peebles 1 Trevor Ward 1	
Ford 3 Toyota 15 Chevrolet 1	Fast Track Racing 19; Rev Racing 1	9	Matt Kemp 5	Steven Barton 1 Chris Vanscoy 1 Mike Sroufe 2 Dick Doheny 2 Joseth Carabantes 5 Andrew Kiernan 3 Ron Swiecki Jr. 3 Derek Peebles 1 Trevor Ward 1	
Ford 3 Toyota 15 Chevrolet 1	Fast Track Racing 19; Rev Racing 1	9	Don Thompson 1	Steven Barton 1 Chris Vanscoy 1 Mike Sroufe 2 Dick Doheny 2 Joseth Carabantes 5 Andrew Kiernan 3 Ron Swiecki Jr. 3 Derek Peebles 1 Trevor Ward 1	
Ford 3 Toyota 15 Chevrolet 1	Fast Track Racing 19; Rev Racing 1	9	Blaine Donahue 1	Steven Barton 1 Chris Vanscoy 1 Mike Sroufe 2 Dick Doheny 2 Joseth Carabantes 5 Andrew Kiernan 3 Ron Swiecki Jr. 3 Derek Peebles 1 Trevor Ward 1	
Ford 3 Toyota 15 Chevrolet 1	Fast Track Racing 19; Rev Racing 1	9	Mike Basham 1	Steven Barton 1 Chris Vanscoy 1 Mike Sroufe 2 Dick Doheny 2 Joseth Carabantes 5 Andrew Kiernan 3 Ron Swiecki Jr. 3 Derek Peebles 1 Trevor Ward 1	
Ford 3 Toyota 15 Chevrolet 1	Fast Track Racing 19; Rev Racing 1	9	Trevor Ward 4	Steven Barton 1 Chris Vanscoy 1 Mike Sroufe 2 Dick Doheny 2 Joseth Carabantes 5 Andrew Kiernan 3 Ron Swiecki Jr. 3 Derek Peebles 1 Trevor Ward 1	
Ford 3 Toyota 15 Chevrolet 1	Fast Track Racing 19; Rev Racing 1	9	Logan Misuraca 1	Steven Barton 1 Chris Vanscoy 1 Mike Sroufe 2 Dick Doheny 2 Joseth Carabantes 5 Andrew Kiernan 3 Ron Swiecki Jr. 3 Derek Peebles 1 Trevor Ward 1	
Ford 13 Toyota 7	Fast Track Racing	10	Ed Pompa 7	Nate Moeller 1 Joseth Carabantes 1 Dick Doheny 1 Andrew Kiernan 5 Chris Vanscoy 5 Tony Cosentino 1 Mike Sroufe 6	
Ford 13 Toyota 7	Fast Track Racing	10	Brad Perez 1	Nate Moeller 1 Joseth Carabantes 1 Dick Doheny 1 Andrew Kiernan 5 Chris Vanscoy 5 Tony Cosentino 1 Mike Sroufe 6	
Ford 13 Toyota 7	Fast Track Racing	10	Nate Moeller 1	Nate Moeller 1 Joseth Carabantes 1 Dick Doheny 1 Andrew Kiernan 5 Chris Vanscoy 5 Tony Cosentino 1 Mike Sroufe 6	
Ford 13 Toyota 7	Fast Track Racing	10	Tony Cosentino 8	Nate Moeller 1 Joseth Carabantes 1 Dick Doheny 1 Andrew Kiernan 5 Chris Vanscoy 5 Tony Cosentino 1 Mike Sroufe 6	
Ford 13 Toyota 7	Fast Track Racing	10	Matt Kemp 1	Nate Moeller 1 Joseth Carabantes 1 Dick Doheny 1 Andrew Kiernan 5 Chris Vanscoy 5 Tony Cosentino 1 Mike Sroufe 6	
Ford 13 Toyota 7	Fast Track Racing	10	Tony Musolino 1	Nate Moeller 1 Joseth Carabantes 1 Dick Doheny 1 Andrew Kiernan 5 Chris Vanscoy 5 Tony Cosentino 1 Mike Sroufe 6	
Chevrolet 3 Toyota 8 Ford 9	Fast Track Racing	11	Cody Dennison 2	Mike Sroufe 4 Chris Vanscoy 12; Dick Doheny 1 Andrew Kierman 3	
Chevrolet 3 Toyota 8 Ford 9	Fast Track Racing	11	Bryce Haugeberg 2	Mike Sroufe 4 Chris Vanscoy 12; Dick Doheny 1 Andrew Kierman 3	
Chevrolet 3 Toyota 8 Ford 9	Fast Track Racing	11	Mike Basham 3	Mike Sroufe 4 Chris Vanscoy 12; Dick Doheny 1 Andrew Kierman 3	
Chevrolet 3 Toyota 8 Ford 9	Fast Track Racing	11	Morgen Baird 1	Mike Sroufe 4 Chris Vanscoy 12; Dick Doheny 1 Andrew Kierman 3	
Chevrolet 3 Toyota 8 Ford 9	Fast Track Racing	11	Tony Cosentino 4	Mike Sroufe 4 Chris Vanscoy 12; Dick Doheny 1 Andrew Kierman 3	
Chevrolet 3 Toyota 8 Ford 9	Fast Track Racing	11	Zachary Tinkle 4	Mike Sroufe 4 Chris Vanscoy 12; Dick Doheny 1 Andrew Kierman 3	
Chevrolet 3 Toyota 8 Ford 9	Fast Track Racing	11	Matt Wilson 1	Mike Sroufe 4 Chris Vanscoy 12; Dick Doheny 1 Andrew Kierman 3	
Chevrolet 3 Toyota 8 Ford 9	Fast Track Racing	11	Tim Monroe 2	Mike Sroufe 4 Chris Vanscoy 12; Dick Doheny 1 Andrew Kierman 3	
Chevrolet 3 Toyota 8 Ford 9	Fast Track Racing	11	Dustin Hillenburg 1	Mike Sroufe 4 Chris Vanscoy 12; Dick Doheny 1 Andrew Kierman 3	
Ford 9 (Note: At Daytona, the No. 12 was initially a Toyota, but for an unknown reason, it had a technical issue, so their backup 12 was a Ford.) Toyota 10 Chevrolet 1	Fast Track Racing	12	Takuma Koga 7	Dick Doheny 9 Carlisle McNair 1 Joseth Carabantes 6 Andrew Kiernan 3 Chris Vanscoy 1	
Ford 9 Toyota 10 Chevrolet 1	Fast Track Racing	12	Tim Monroe 1	Dick Doheny 9 Carlisle McNair 1 Joseth Carabantes 6 Andrew Kiernan 3 Chris Vanscoy 1	
Ford 9 Toyota 10 Chevrolet 1	Fast Track Racing	12	Matt Kemp 5	Dick Doheny 9 Carlisle McNair 1 Joseth Carabantes 6 Andrew Kiernan 3 Chris Vanscoy 1	
Ford 9 Toyota 10 Chevrolet 1	Fast Track Racing	12	Mike Basham 2	Dick Doheny 9 Carlisle McNair 1 Joseth Carabantes 6 Andrew Kiernan 3 Chris Vanscoy 1	
Ford 9 Toyota 10 Chevrolet 1	Fast Track Racing	12	Trevor Ward 3	Dick Doheny 9 Carlisle McNair 1 Joseth Carabantes 6 Andrew Kiernan 3 Chris Vanscoy 1	
Ford 9 Toyota 10 Chevrolet 1	Fast Track Racing	12	Trent Curtis 1	Dick Doheny 9 Carlisle McNair 1 Joseth Carabantes 6 Andrew Kiernan 3 Chris Vanscoy 1	
Ford 9 Toyota 10 Chevrolet 1	Fast Track Racing	12	Tony Cosentino 1	Dick Doheny 9 Carlisle McNair 1 Joseth Carabantes 6 Andrew Kiernan 3 Chris Vanscoy 1	
Ford 8 Chevrolet 12	Maples Motorsports 19; VWV Racing 1 (Note: It was a VWV Racing entry using Maples Motorsports' owner points.)	67	Ryan Roulette 6	Todd Parrott 1 Kyle Totman 14; Jeremy Petty 4 Steve Chick 1	
Ford 8 Chevrolet 12	Maples Motorsports 19; VWV Racing 1	67	Ryan Vargas 4	Todd Parrott 1 Kyle Totman 14; Jeremy Petty 4 Steve Chick 1	
Ford 8 Chevrolet 12	Maples Motorsports 19; VWV Racing 1	67	Mandy Chick 1 (Note: Entry was fielded in a collaboration with Team Chick Motorsports.)	Todd Parrott 1 Kyle Totman 14; Jeremy Petty 4 Steve Chick 1	
Ford 8 Chevrolet 12	Maples Motorsports 19; VWV Racing 1	67	Casey Budd 1	Todd Parrott 1 Kyle Totman 14; Jeremy Petty 4 Steve Chick 1	
Ford 8 Chevrolet 12	Maples Motorsports 19; VWV Racing 1	67	Austin Vaughn 4	Todd Parrott 1 Kyle Totman 14; Jeremy Petty 4 Steve Chick 1	
Ford 8 Chevrolet 12	Maples Motorsports 19; VWV Racing 1	67	Presley Sorah 1	Todd Parrott 1 Kyle Totman 14; Jeremy Petty 4 Steve Chick 1	
Ford 8 Chevrolet 12	Maples Motorsports 19; VWV Racing 1	67	Shane Backes 3	Todd Parrott 1 Kyle Totman 14; Jeremy Petty 4 Steve Chick 1	
Toyota 8 Chevrolet 4 Ford 8 (Note: At Michigan, the No. 06 was initially a Toyota, but because the engine blew up, they couldn't race the original No. 06, so their backup 06 was a Ford.)	Fast Track Racing 1 (Note: It was a Fast Track Racing entry using Wayne Peterson Racing's owner points.); Wayne Peterson Racing 19	06	Bryce Haugeberg 1	Chris Vanscoy 1 Nate Moeller 17; Michael Peterson 1 George Gimbert 1	
Toyota 8 Chevrolet 4 Ford 8	Fast Track Racing 1 Wayne Peterson Racing 19	06	Brayton Laster (R) 19 (Note: Laster ran the full season split between the Wayne Peterson Racing Nos. 0 and 06 cars.)	Chris Vanscoy 1 Nate Moeller 17; Michael Peterson 1 George Gimbert 1	

=== Limited schedule ===
Manufacturer	Team	No.	Driver	Crew chief	Races	Ref
Chevrolet	1/4 Ley Racing	4	Dale Quarterley	Shane Wilson 2 Alex Quarterley 1	3	
Chevrolet	ACR Motorsports (Note: Entries are fielded in a collaboration with CR7 Motorsports.)	79	Jason Kitzmiller	Doug Howe	1	
Chevrolet	ACR Motorsports	79	Isaac Kitzmiller	Doug Howe	4	
Chevrolet	Andrew Patterson Racing	40	Andrew Patterson	Tony Ponkauskas 1 Austin Simmons 4	5	
Chevrolet	Bill McAnally Racing	19	Jake Bollman	Cayden Lapcevich	1	
Chevrolet	Brother-In-Law Racing	57	Hunter Deshautelle	Dick Rahilly 1 Todd Cooper 1	2	
Chevrolet	Brother-In-Law Racing	57	Bryan Dauzat	Bob Rahilly	1	
Chevrolet	Brother-In-Law Racing	75	Bryan Dauzat	Bob Rahilly 1 Dick Rahilly 1	2	
Chevrolet	Charles Buchanan Racing	87	Chuck Buchanan Jr.	Craig Wood	1	
Chevrolet	CK Motorsports	72	Christopher Werth	Ron Otto	1	
Chevrolet	CW Motorsports	93	Caleb Costner	Riley Higgins 2 Darrell Phillips 1	3	
Chevrolet	Drew White Motorsports	22	Nick White	Mike Harmon	1	
Chevrolet	Empire Racing	8	Sean Corr	Derek Kearns 1 Adam Murphy 1	2	
Chevrolet	Kelly Kovski Racing	16	Kelly Kovski	Grant Enfinger 1 John Hanson 1	2	
Chevrolet	KLAS Motorsports	71	Glen Reen	Jesse Martin	1	
Chevrolet	Moyer-Petroniro Racing	88	A. J. Moyer	Kevin Ingram	2	
Chevrolet	Pinnacle Racing Group	82	Hélio Castroneves	Shane Huffman	1	
Chevrolet	Pinnacle Racing Group	82	Austin Green	Shane Huffman	1	
Chevrolet	Pinnacle Racing Group	82	Connor Mosack	Shane Huffman	1	
Chevrolet	Pinnacle Racing Group	82	Tristan McKee	Shane Huffman	3	
Chevrolet	Rev Racing	2	Lanie Buice	Matt Bucher 4 Derek Peebles 3	4	
Chevrolet	Rev Racing	2	Eloy Falcón	Matt Bucher 4 Derek Peebles 3	3	
Chevrolet	Rick Ware Racing	51	Carson Ware	Jeff Spraker	1	
Chevrolet	Scofield Motorsports	07	Jeff Scofield	Tod Meyers	1	
Chevrolet	Sigma Performance Services	23	Katherine Legge	Tom Ackerman 10; Joey Cohen 3	1	
Chevrolet	Sigma Performance Services	23	Tyler Reif	Tom Ackerman 10; Joey Cohen 3	9	
Chevrolet	Sigma Performance Services	23	Spencer Gallagher	Tom Ackerman 10; Joey Cohen 3	3	
Chevrolet	Spire Motorsports	77	Corey Day	Mark McFarland 2 Shane Huffman 2	3	
Chevrolet	Spire Motorsports	77	Tristan McKee	Mark McFarland 2 Shane Huffman 2	1	
Chevrolet	Steve Lewis Racing	62	Steve Lewis Jr.	Steve Lewis Sr.	2	
Chevrolet	Strike Mamba Racing	51	Blake Lothian	John Reaume	1	
Chevrolet	Strike Mamba Racing	72	Jonathan Reaume	Al Lebert	1	
Chevrolet	Young's Motorsports	02	Craig Bracken	Tyler Young	1	
Ford	AM Racing	76	Kole Raz	Ryan London	5	
Ford	City Garage Motorsports	5	Michael Clayton	Logan Hampton 2 Nathan Guerero 1	3	
Ford	City Garage Motorsports	85	Becca Monopoli	Tom Monopoli	4	
Ford	High Point Racing	50	Trevor Huddleston	Jeff Schrader	1	
Ford	Jan's Towing Racing with Kennealy Keller Motorsports	1	Robbie Kennealy	Chris Greaney	1	
Ford	Jan's Towing Racing with Kennealy Keller Motorsports	71	Kyle Keller	Brian Kizer	1	
Ford	Kimmel Racing	68	Scott Melton	Bill Kimmel 3 Will Kimmel 3	2	
Ford	Kimmel Racing	68	Will Kimmel	Bill Kimmel 3 Will Kimmel 3	1	
Ford	Kimmel Racing	68	Regina Sirvent	Bill Kimmel 3 Will Kimmel 3	3	
Ford	Rette Jones Racing	29	Kyle Steckly	Logan Yiengst	1	
Ford	Rette Jones Racing	30	Garrett Mitchell	Mark Rette	4	
Ford	Ryan Huff Motorsports	36	Ryan Huff	Richard Burgess	3	
Toyota	Central Coast Racing	3	Adrián Ferrer	Gilbert Muñoz	1	
Toyota	Central Coast Racing	13	Tanner Reif	Michael Muñoz	1	
Toyota	Hill Motorsports	56	Timmy Hill	Terry Elmore	2	
Toyota	Jerry Pitts Racing	5	Eric Johnson Jr.	Dustin Ash	1	
Toyota	MacZink Racing	65	Jeffery MacZink	Jarod MacZink	1	
Toyota	MAN Motorsports	95	Hunter Wright	David Noble 3 Hunter Wright 1	1	
Toyota	MAN Motorsports	95	Jackson McLerran	David Noble 3 Hunter Wright 1	2	
Toyota	MAN Motorsports	95	Conner Popplewell	David Noble 3 Hunter Wright 1	1	
Toyota	MAN Motorsports	96	Jackson McLerran	Todd Parrott	1	
Toyota	Martin Racing	52	Robert Martin	Jeff Spraker	1	
Toyota	NEMCO Motorsports	29	Ryan Gemmell	Joe Nemechek	2	
Toyota	Nitro Motorsports	46	Thad Moffitt	Nick Tucker 1 Shannon Rursch 3 Jim Long 2 Danny Johnson 1 Ron Otto 1	8	
Toyota	Nitro Motorsports	70	Amber Balcaen	Jeff McClure 1 Danny Johnson 1 Shannon Rursch 13; Jamie Jones 1	2	
Toyota	Nitro Motorsports	70	Treyten Lapcevich	Jeff McClure 1 Danny Johnson 1 Shannon Rursch 13; Jamie Jones 1	1	
Toyota	Nitro Motorsports	70	Taylor Reimer	Jeff McClure 1 Danny Johnson 1 Shannon Rursch 13; Jamie Jones 1	2	
Toyota	Nitro Motorsports	70	Thomas Annunziata	Jeff McClure 1 Danny Johnson 1 Shannon Rursch 13; Jamie Jones 1	2	
Toyota	Nitro Motorsports	70	Camden Murphy	Jeff McClure 1 Danny Johnson 1 Shannon Rursch 13; Jamie Jones 1	1	
Toyota	Nitro Motorsports	70	Sam Corry	Jeff McClure 1 Danny Johnson 1 Shannon Rursch 13; Jamie Jones 1	2	
Toyota	Nitro Motorsports	70	Thad Moffitt	Jeff McClure 1 Danny Johnson 1 Shannon Rursch 13; Jamie Jones 1	1	
Toyota	Nitro Motorsports	70	Brent Crews	Jeff McClure 1 Danny Johnson 1 Shannon Rursch 13; Jamie Jones 1	2	
Toyota	Nitro Motorsports	70	Julian DaCosta	Jeff McClure 1 Danny Johnson 1 Shannon Rursch 13; Jamie Jones 1	1	
Toyota	Nitro Motorsports	70	Andrew Patterson	Jeff McClure 1 Danny Johnson 1 Shannon Rursch 13; Jamie Jones 1	1	
Toyota	Nitro Motorsports	70	Justin Rothberg	Jeff McClure 1 Danny Johnson 1 Shannon Rursch 13; Jamie Jones 1	1	
Toyota	Richmond Motorsports	27	Tim Richmond	Adam Murphy	5	
Toyota	Rise Motorsports	31	Tim Viens	Matthew Wright 7 Tim Goulet 8 Nik Smith 3	2	
Toyota	Rise Motorsports	31	Tim Goulet	Matthew Wright 7 Tim Goulet 8 Nik Smith 3	5	
Toyota	Rise Motorsports	31	Rick Goodale	Matthew Wright 7 Tim Goulet 8 Nik Smith 3	2	
Toyota	Rise Motorsports	31	Derek White	Matthew Wright 7 Tim Goulet 8 Nik Smith 3	1	
Toyota	Rise Motorsports	31	Quinn Davis	Matthew Wright 7 Tim Goulet 8 Nik Smith 3	4	
Toyota	Rise Motorsports	31	Chase Howard	Matthew Wright 7 Tim Goulet 8 Nik Smith 3	2	
Toyota	Rise Motorsports	31	Bobby Dale Earnhardt	Matthew Wright 7 Tim Goulet 8 Nik Smith 3	2	
Toyota	Rise Motorsports	31	Presley Sorah	Matthew Wright 7 Tim Goulet 8 Nik Smith 3	1	
Toyota	Shearer Speed Racing	98	Dale Shearer	Nolan Gross 3 Vincenzo Valentin 2	3	
Toyota	Shearer Speed Racing	98	Mike Basham	Nolan Gross 3 Vincenzo Valentin 2	2	
Toyota	Shockwave Motorsports	05	David Smith	Brandon Carlson	1	
Toyota	Venturini Motorsports	15	Chase Pinsonneault	Ron Otto 2 Jamie Jones 1 Larry Balsitis 3 Billy Venturini 1	1	
Toyota	Venturini Motorsports	15	Treyten Lapcevich	Ron Otto 2 Jamie Jones 1 Larry Balsitis 3 Billy Venturini 1	1	
Toyota	Venturini Motorsports	15	Patrick Staropoli	Ron Otto 2 Jamie Jones 1 Larry Balsitis 3 Billy Venturini 1	1	
Toyota	Venturini Motorsports	15	Kris Wright	Ron Otto 2 Jamie Jones 1 Larry Balsitis 3 Billy Venturini 1	3	
Toyota	Venturini Motorsports	15	Jake Finch	Ron Otto 2 Jamie Jones 1 Larry Balsitis 3 Billy Venturini 1	1	
Toyota 3 Chevrolet 3	CCM Racing	7	Eric Caudell	Jay Shaffer 1 Andy Jirik 5	3	
Toyota 3 Chevrolet 3	CCM Racing	7	Kadence Davenport	Jay Shaffer 1 Andy Jirik 5	3	
Toyota 2 Chevrolet 1	Cook Racing Technologies	17	Patrick Staropoli	Sean Samuels	2	
Toyota 2 Chevrolet 1	Cook Racing Technologies	17	Kaylee Bryson	Sean Samuels	1	
Ford 1 Toyota 4	Brad Smith Motorsports 1 (Note: It was a Brad Smith Motorsports entry using Fast Track Racing's owner points.); Fast Track Racing 4	01	Jeff Smith	Jayson Reynolds 1 Joseth Carabantes 3 Trevor Ward 1	1	
Ford 1 Toyota 4	Brad Smith Motorsports 1 Fast Track Racing 4	01	Matt Kemp	Jayson Reynolds 1 Joseth Carabantes 3 Trevor Ward 1	2	
Ford 1 Toyota 4	Brad Smith Motorsports 1 Fast Track Racing 4	01	Trevor Ward	Jayson Reynolds 1 Joseth Carabantes 3 Trevor Ward 1	1	
Ford 1 Toyota 4	Brad Smith Motorsports 1 Fast Track Racing 4	01	Mike Basham	Jayson Reynolds 1 Joseth Carabantes 3 Trevor Ward 1	1	
Ford 5 Chevrolet 1	Kimmel Racing 5 Finney Racing Enterprises 1 (Note: It was a Finney Racing Enterprises entry using Kimmel Racing's owner points.)	69	Nolan Wilson	Will Kimmel 2 Bill Kimmel 3 Wally Finney 1	2	
Ford 5 Chevrolet 1	Kimmel Racing 5 Finney Racing Enterprises 1	69	Miguel Gomes	Will Kimmel 2 Bill Kimmel 3 Wally Finney 1	1	
Ford 5 Chevrolet 1	Kimmel Racing 5 Finney Racing Enterprises 1	69	Will Kimmel	Will Kimmel 2 Bill Kimmel 3 Wally Finney 1	2	
Ford 5 Chevrolet 1	Kimmel Racing 5 Finney Racing Enterprises 1	69	Brian Finney	Will Kimmel 2 Bill Kimmel 3 Wally Finney 1	1	
Ford 1 Toyota 6 Chevrolet 2	KLAS Motorsports	73	Andy Jankowiak	Mike Dayton 7 Andy Seuss 1	9	
Ford 1 Toyota 6 Chevrolet 2	KLAS Motorsports	73	Glen Reen	Mike Dayton 7 Andy Seuss 1	1	
Ford 3 Toyota 2 Chevrolet 1	Mullins Racing	3	Willie Mullins	Dinah Mullins 1 Darrell Ferree 1 Will Kimmel 1 Willie Mullins 1 Jeff Spraker 2	5	
Ford 3 Toyota 2 Chevrolet 1	Mullins Racing	3	Jeff Anton	Dinah Mullins 1 Darrell Ferree 1 Will Kimmel 1 Willie Mullins 1 Jeff Spraker 2	1	
Ford 4 Toyota 1	VWV Racing	34	Corey Aiken	Larry Wilcox 1 Brad Elter 4	3	
Ford 4 Toyota 1	VWV Racing	34	Austin Vaughn	Larry Wilcox 1 Brad Elter 4	2	
Chevrolet 3 Ford 2 Toyota 2	Wayne Peterson Racing	0	Brayton Laster (R)	Michael Peterson 5 Wayne Peterson 1	1	
Chevrolet 3 Ford 2 Toyota 2	Wayne Peterson Racing	0	Ben Peterson	Michael Peterson 5 Wayne Peterson 1	1	
Chevrolet 3 Ford 2 Toyota 2	Wayne Peterson Racing	0	Kevin Hinckle	Michael Peterson 5 Wayne Peterson 1	2	
Chevrolet 3 Ford 2 Toyota 2	Wayne Peterson Racing	0	Nate Moeller	Michael Peterson 5 Wayne Peterson 1	2	
Chevrolet 3 Ford 2 Toyota 2	Wayne Peterson Racing	0	Con Nicolopoulos	Michael Peterson 5 Wayne Peterson 1	1	

== Schedule ==
The entire schedule was released on September 27, 2024.

No	Race title	Track	Location	Date	TV	Time (ET)	Live Stream
1	Ride the ‘Dente 200	O Daytona International Speedway	Daytona Beach, Florida	February 15	FOX	Noon	Fox Sports app
2	General Tire 150	O Phoenix Raceway	Avondale, Arizona	March 7	FS1	8 PM	Fox Sports app
3	General Tire 200	O Talladega Superspeedway	Lincoln, Alabama	April 26	FS1	12:30 PM	Fox Sports app
4	Tide 150	O Kansas Speedway	Kansas City, Kansas	May 9	FS1	8 PM	Fox Sports app
5	General Tire 150	O Charlotte Motor Speedway	Concord, North Carolina	May 23	FS1	6 PM	Fox Sports app
6	Henry Ford Health 200	O Michigan International Speedway	Brooklyn, Michigan	June 6	FS2	5 PM	Fox Sports app
7	Berlin ARCA 200	O Berlin Raceway	Marne, Michigan	June 14	FS1	7 PM	Fox Sports app
8	Shore Lunch 250 presented by Dutch Boy	O Elko Speedway	Elko New Market, Minnesota	June 21	FS2	9 PM	Fox Sports app
9	Lime Rock Park 100	R Lime Rock Park	Lakeville, Connecticut	June 28	FS2	4 PM	Fox Sports app
10	General Tire 150	O Dover Motor Speedway	Dover, Delaware	July 18	FS1	5 PM	Fox Sports app
11	LiUNA! 150 presented by Dutch Boy	O Lucas Oil Indianapolis Raceway Park	Brownsburg, Indiana	July 25	FS1	5:30 PM	Fox Sports app
12	Atlas 150	O Iowa Speedway	Newton, Iowa	August 1	FS1	7 PM	Fox Sports app
13	General Tire 100 at The Glen	R Watkins Glen International	Watkins Glen, New York	August 8	FS2	2 PM	Fox Sports app
14	Allen Crowe 100	D Illinois State Fairgrounds Racetrack	Springfield, Illinois	August 17	FS1	2 PM	Fox Sports app
15	Badger 200	O Madison International Speedway	Rutland, Wisconsin	August 22	FS1	9 PM	Fox Sports app
16	Southern Illinois 100	D DuQuoin State Fairgrounds Racetrack	Du Quoin, Illinois	August 31	FS1	8:30 PM	Fox Sports app
17	Bush's Beans 200	O Bristol Motor Speedway	Bristol, Tennessee	September 11	FS1	5:30 PM	Fox Sports app
18	Kentuckiana Ford Dealers ARCA 200	O Salem Speedway	Salem, Indiana	September 20	FS2	8 PM	Fox Sports app
19	Reese's 150	O Kansas Speedway	Kansas City, Kansas	September 26	FS1	8 PM	Fox Sports app
20	Owens Corning 200	O Toledo Speedway	Toledo, Ohio	October 4	FS2	4 PM	Fox Sports app / FloRacing

Notes

- Lime Rock Park joined the schedule for the first time.
- Madison International Speedway returned the schedule for the first time in 5 years.
D Dirt track
O Oval track
R Road course

== Season summary ==
Round 1: Ride the 'Dente 200

William Sawalich scored the pole after qualifying was cancelled. In the end, Brenden Queen secured his first career ARCA victory and first of the season in a crash-filled race.

Round 2: General Tire 150 (Phoenix)

Brent Crews scored the pole after qualifying was cancelled. In the end, Crews would hold off Brenden Queen in ARCA overtime and secure his third career ARCA victory and first of the season.

Round 3: General Tire 200

William Sawalich was awarded the pole since no qualifying session was run. In the end, Lawless Alan survived last lap chaos and edged out Thad Moffitt to secure his first career ARCA victory and first of the season. Isabella Robusto finished 3rd in this race, marking the highest finish for a female at Talledega.

Round 4: Tide 150

Lawless Alan won the pole. In the end, Brenden Queen secured his second career ARCA victory over Lawless Alan in a 1 lap shootout after leading the most laps, his second of the season.

Round 5: General Tire 150 (Charlotte)

Will Kimmel won the pole, his first since 2017. However Kimmel blew an engine while leading after just 13 laps. On lap 38 coming to the restart, Garrett Mitchell spun the tires on the restart from the front row after staying out and got loose, making contact with Isabella Robusto, causing her to spin up the track, hitting the outside wall hard. Then William Sawalich and others spun around causing a multi-car stackup. In the end, Austin Green led the most laps and secured his first career ARCA victory in his second career start.

Round 6: Henry Ford Health 200

Brenden Queen won the pole. In the end, Queen held off Corey Heim in a tight battle to secure his third career ARCA victory and his third of the season.

Round 7: Berlin ARCA 200

Treyten Lapcevich won the pole and dominated, leading every lap to secure his first career ARCA victory in his first career start.

Round 8: Shore Lunch 250 presented by Dutch Boy

Brenden Queen won the pole and dominated, leading the majority of the laps until Max Reaves came and ended up securing his first career ARCA victory in his second ARCA career start.

Round 9: Lime Rock Park 100

Thomas Annunziata won the pole and dominated, leading every lap to secure his first career ARCA victory in his first career start.

Round 10: General Tire 150 (Dover)

Brenden Queen won the pole and dominated, leading every lap to secure his fourth career ARCA victory, fourth of the season and his first ARCA East victory in his first career East start.

Round 11: LiUNA! 150

Brenden Queen was awarded the pole since no qualifying session was run. In the end, Brent Crews survived Queen to secure his fourth career ARCA victory, his second career ARCA Menards Series East win, and his third win of the season.

Round 12: Atlas 150

Brent Crews won the pole. In the end, Brenden Queen would hold off a hard-charging Crews in the final few laps to earn his fifth career ARCA win, his second career ARCA East win, and his fifth of the season.

Round 13: General Tire 100 at The Glen

Brent Crews won the pole. In the end, Tristan McKee, would take advantage of late-race troubles for the dominant Crews, who was dominating before experiencing battery issues with three laps to go. He was able to continue the race but fell back to finish ninth, last of the lead lap drivers, and held off the field in a one-lap shootout to earn his first career ARCA win in his first career start. He also became the second-youngest driver to win an ARCA race at fifteen years and five days.

Round 14: Allen Crowe 100

Brenden Queen was awarded the pole since no qualifying session was run. Brent Crews was able to take the lead early from Queen, and showed off his dirt racing background by leading the final 83 laps to earn his fifth career ARCA Menards Series win, and his third of the season.

Round 15: Badger 200

Max Reaves won the pole and dominated, leading every lap, securing his second career ARCA victory in Madison's first time on the calendar since 2019.

Round 16: Southern Illinois 100

Lawless Alan won the pole. In a wild race, Brenden Queen would take advantage of a late restart, and led the final 22 laps of the event to earn his sixth career ARCA win. Brent Crews, the dominant driver of the race, was involved in a late race wreck with eight laps to go, ending his chances at sweeping both dirt races. He retired from the race and was credited with a 15th-place finish.

Round 17: Bush's Beans 200

In the final ARCA Menards Series and ARCA Menards Series East combination race of the season, Brent Crews was able to pull off a dominating performance, leading every lap from the pole position to earn his sixth career ARCA win, his third career ARCA East win, and his fifth win of the season. With his win, he clinched the 2025 East Series owner's championship for JGR. For the East Series, Isaac Kitzmiller would win their season's championship.

Round 18: Kentuckiana Ford Dealers ARCA 200

Max Reaves dominated the majority of the event, after leading a race-high 111 laps from the pole position, but lost the lead to Lavar Scott before the second halfway break. Scott led a career-high 66 laps before losing the lead after a late-race caution that took out Reaves. Brenden Queen executed on the final restart and led the final 23 laps to win his seventh win of the season and of his career. Scott suffered damage after hitting the wall, and fell back to finish fourth.

Round 19: Reese's 150

Brenden Queen started on pole and would later take the lead from the dominating Gio Ruggiero, and survived two overtime restarts to earn his eighth career ARCA win, and his second consecutive win. Ruggiero dominated the majority of the race, leading a race-high 74 laps before being passed by Queen with just over 10 laps to go. With this win, he swept the races at Kansas in 2025.

Round 20: Owens Corning 200

Max Reaves started on pole and would dominate, leading all but one lap to secure his third ARCA victory. Besides finishing second-place, Brenden Queen would lock up the 2025 ARCA Menards Series title.

== Results and standings ==
=== Race results ===
No.	Race	Pole position	Most laps led	Winning driver	Manufacturer	No.	Winning team	Report
1	Ride the 'Dente 200	William Sawalich	William Sawalich	Brenden Queen	Chevrolet	28	Pinnacle Racing Group	Report
2	General Tire 150	Brent Crews	Brenden Queen	Brent Crews	Toyota	18	Joe Gibbs Racing	Report
3	General Tire 200	William Sawalich	Lawless Alan	Lawless Alan	Toyota	20	Venturini Motorsports	Report
4	Tide 150	Lawless Alan	Brenden Queen	Brenden Queen	Chevrolet	28	Pinnacle Racing Group	Report
5	General Tire 150	Will Kimmel	Austin Green	Austin Green	Chevrolet	82	Pinnacle Racing Group	Report
6	Henry Ford Health 200	Brenden Queen	Brenden Queen	Brenden Queen	Chevrolet	28	Pinnacle Racing Group	Report
7	Berlin ARCA 200	Treyten Lapcevich	Treyten Lapcevich	Treyten Lapcevich	Toyota	70	Nitro Motorsports	Report
8	Shore Lunch 250 presented by Dutch Boy	Brenden Queen	Brenden Queen	Max Reaves	Toyota	18	Joe Gibbs Racing	Report
9	Lime Rock Park 100	Thomas Annunziata	Thomas Annunziata	Thomas Annunziata	Toyota	70	Nitro Motorsports	Report
10	General Tire 150	Brenden Queen	Brenden Queen	Brenden Queen	Chevrolet	28	Pinnacle Racing Group	Report
11	LiUNA! 150 presented by Dutch Boy	Brenden Queen	Brenden Queen	Brent Crews	Toyota	18	Joe Gibbs Racing	Report
12	Atlas 150	Brent Crews	Brenden Queen	Brenden Queen	Chevrolet	28	Pinnacle Racing Group	Report
13	General Tire 100 at The Glen	Brent Crews	Brent Crews	Tristan McKee	Chevrolet	77	Spire Motorsports	Report
14	Allen Crowe 100	Brenden Queen	Brent Crews	Brent Crews	Toyota	70	Nitro Motorsports	Report
15	Badger 200	Max Reaves	Max Reaves	Max Reaves	Toyota	18	Joe Gibbs Racing	Report
16	Southern Illinois 100	Lawless Alan	Brent Crews	Brenden Queen	Chevrolet	28	Pinnacle Racing Group	Report
17	Bush's Beans 200	Brent Crews	Brent Crews	Brent Crews	Toyota	18	Joe Gibbs Racing	Report
18	Kentuckiana Ford Dealers ARCA 200	Max Reaves	Max Reaves	Brenden Queen	Chevrolet	28	Pinnacle Racing Group	Report
19	Reese's 150	Brenden Queen	Gio Ruggiero	Brenden Queen	Chevrolet	28	Pinnacle Racing Group	Report
20	Owens Corning 200	Max Reaves	Max Reaves	Max Reaves	Toyota	18	Joe Gibbs Racing	Report

=== Drivers' championship ===
Notes:

- The pole winner also receives one bonus point, similar to the previous ARCA points system used until 2019 and unlike NASCAR.
- Additionally, after groups of five races of the season, drivers that compete in all five races receive fifty additional points. These points bonuses will be given after the races at Charlotte, Dover, Madison and Toledo.
  - Lavar Scott, Brenden Queen, Lawless Alan, Andy Jankowiak, Jason Kitzmiller, Thad Moffitt, Alex Clubb, Isabella Robusto, Michael Maples, and Brayton Laster received this points bonus for having competed in the first five races of the season (Daytona, Phoenix, Talladega, Kansas in May, and Charlotte). Queen, Alan, Scott, Kitzmiller, Robusto, Clubb, Maples, Laster, and Brad Smith received this points bonus for having competed in the next five races of the season (Michigan, Berlin, Elko, Lime Rock, and Dover). Queen, Scott, Alan, Kitzmiller, Robusto, Clubb, Maples, Laster, and Smith received this points bonus for having competed in the next five races of the season (Indianapolis, Iowa, Watkins Glen, Springfield, and Madison). Queen, Scott, Kitzmiller, Robusto, Clubb, Maples, Laster, Smith, and Tony Cosentino received this points bonus for having competed in the final races of the season (DuQuoin, Bristol, Salem, Kansas in September, and Toledo).

(key) Bold – Pole position awarded by time. Italics – Pole position set by final practice results or rainout. * – Most laps led. ** – All laps led.

Pos	Driver	DAY	PHO	TAL	KAN	CLT	MCH	BLN	ELK	LRP	DOV	IRP	IOW	GLN	ISF	MAD	DSF	BRI	SLM	KAN	TOL	Points
1	Brenden Queen **(R)**	1	2*	25	1*	14	**1***	4	**2***	4	**1****	3*	1*	21	4	3	1	3	1	**1**	2	1034
2	Lavar Scott	4	5	6	5	3	5	5	7	7	11	5	5	10	2	2	6	11	4	25	22	928
3	Jason Kitzmiller	3	27	5	7	32	8	8	6	19	8	8	10	17	10	7	14	9	11	9	9	854
4	Isabella Robusto **(R)**	21	31	3	13	24	9	6	5	10	3	4	4	8	21	4	4	27	5	10	4	846
5	Lawless Alan	18	4	1*	**4**	13	3	3	3	3	12	2	3	12	20	18	**2**	Wth				744
6	Alex Clubb	16	28	20	18	19	20	12	10	12	18	22	20	16	8	13	11	21	19	19	15	743
7	Michael Maples	31	21	31	12	17	15	13	14	13	13	29	16	18	15	15	9	20	15	22	12	729
8	Brayton Laster **(R)**	24	22	34	15	20	19	17	13	15	16	25	21	23	7	14	13	29	16	21	16	700
9	Brad Smith	Wth	33	26	23	27	21	15	18	24	20	26	27	27	9	19	16	22	17	24	18	574
10	Tony Cosentino		26			11	22	16			22	21	14		11	9	8	18	9	15	11	453
11	Brent Crews		1							6	21	1	**2**	**9***	1*		15*	**1****				365
12	Andy Jankowiak	8	14	4	6	5	16							7				14		18		355
13	Thad Moffitt	37	7	2	16	7	6					10		15						7		327
14	Tyler Reif		19				7				5	14	11	2				6		13	5	315
15	Max Reaves							2	1						6	**1***	10		**18***		**1***	283
16	Matt Kemp			35	20	29	25	9	21		24	32			18	22			20	29	23	265
17	Mason Mitchell				3			7				15	9			6			6	6		256
18	Andrew Patterson					6					10	12						13	2	8		213
19	Mike Basham				19	30	23			11		24	25		Wth			34	12		20	198
20	Patrick Staropoli		8	11	22	8												10		11		194
21	Trevor Ward							23	24	22			26	25	17	21	20					174
22	Ed Pompa	13		30						20				22			12		14	27	Wth	170
23	Ryan Roulette	9		21		26	12				17			Wth						14		166
24	William Sawalich	2*		9	2	4																164
25	Tristan McKee													1		11		2			3	163
26	Takuma Koga	25									15	31	22					33		16	14	152
27	Isaac Kitzmiller										4	7	6					8				151
28	Willie Mullins	35						10	9							10					7	149
29	Kole Raz	6	6	22		21	18															147
30	Austin Vaughn									18	14	30	18		19			23				142
31	Jake Finch	15		7			Wth				7							7				141
32	Tim Goulet	Wth		24	14			14		14					16							138
33	Lanie Buice				8	10						11						12				135
34	Becca Monopoli	26		37				11	16			34									10	130
35	Leland Honeyman																	4	3	3		122
36	Quinn Davis								11			19	15			12						119
37	Jeff Maconi						26			17						20				20	21	116
38	Taylor Reimer								8											5	6	113
39	Tim Richmond	17		33		22							19					16				113
40	Garrett Mitchell	30		10		9												17				110
41	Zachary Tinkle										9	16	12					31				108
42	Ryan Vargas		32		10												18		10			106
43	Eloy Falcón						10						8							12		102
44	Kris Wright												24	3						4		101
45	Bryce Haugeberg	10		8					15													100
46	Sam Corry											13	7		13							99
47	Nate Moeller				24	31	27			23											19	96
48	Tim Monroe		23												12		5					92
49	Thomas Annunziata									**1***								5				88
50	Regina Sirvent						14					17	13									88
51	Corey Aiken									16	19			26				28				87
52	Gio Ruggiero						4													2*		85
53	Dale Quarterley	33								9				5								85
54	Treyten Lapcevich		3					**1****														84
55	Kelly Kovski														3		3					82
56	Corey Day	22	10																	23		78
57	Bryan Dauzat	20		18		16																78
58	Ryan Gemmell									5				6								77
59	Alon Day									2				11								76
60	Cody Dennison	34	16	32								18										76
61	Julian DaCosta															5					8	75
62	Spencer Gallagher			23	9	25																75
63	Kadence Davenport								17			23	17									75
64	Will Kimmel				25	**28**													7			74
65	Jackson McLerran											20						26			13	73
66	Caleb Costner	38		12			11															71
67	Chase Howard																7		13			68
68	Shane Backes													24		17					25	66
69	Hunter Deshautelle	11		13																		64
70	Glen Reen									21				4								63
71	Timmy Hill										6							19				63
72	Jeff Scofield	14				12																62
73	Dale Shearer			29				20	22													61
74	Presley Sorah				21							28									24	59
75	Eric Caudell	40		19																17		56
76	A. J. Moyer	7		28																		53
77	Casey Carden					23								14								51
78	Ryan Huff	DNQ		27		15																49
79	Scott Melton	23		17																		49
80	Tim Viens	19	20																			49
81	Austin Green					1*																48
82	Chris Golden							19											21			48
83	Sean Corr	36													5							47
84	Nolan Wilson	28		14																		46
85	Michael Clayton							22	23			DNQ										46
86	Grant Enfinger					2																43
87	Amber Balcaen	29		16																		43
88	Kevin Hinckle				17															28		43
89	Corey Heim						2															42
90	Camden Murphy										2											42
91	Brian Clubb				26				20	Wth												42
92	Ty Fredrickson								4													40
93	Hélio Castroneves	5																				39
94	Connor Mosack											6										38
95	Josh White																19	32				37
96	Jeff Anton									8												36
97	Kaylee Bryson															8						36
98	Conner Popplewell																		8			36
99	Robbie Kennealy		9																			35
100	Hunter Wright											9										35
101	Eric Johnson Jr.		11																			33
102	Miguel Gomes				11																	33
103	Jason White	12																				32
104	Trevor Huddleston		12																			32
105	Tony Musolino								12													32
106	Steve Lewis Jr.	DNQ		15																		32
107	Bobby Dale Earnhardt																	30		26		32
108	Tanner Reif		13																			31
109	Morgen Baird						13															31
110	Trent Curtis													13								31
111	Joe Cooksey														14							30
112	Kyle Keller		15																			29
113	Carson Ware																	15				29
114	Dustin Hillenburg															16						28
115	Blake Lothian		17																			27
116	Derek White						17															27
117	Jade Avedisian																17					27
118	Justin Rothberg																				17	27
119	Adrián Ferrer		18																			26
120	Rick Goodale					18					Wth				Wth							26
121	Mandy Chick							18														26
122	Casey Budd								19													25
123	Christopher Werth													19								25
124	Matt Wilson													20								24
125	Don Thompson							21														23
126	Blaine Donahue										23											21
127	Colby Evans												23									21
128	Jake Bollman		24																			20
129	Jeffery MacZink						24															20
130	Jeff Smith							24														20
131	Con Nicolopoulos																	24				20
132	Jonathan Reaume		25																			19
133	Logan Misuraca																	25				19
134	Craig Bracken	27																				17
135	Brian Finney											27										17
136	David Smith		29																			15
137	Brad Perez		30																			14
138	Kyle Steckly	32																				12
139	Doug Miller											33										11
140	Alex Malycke		34																			10
141	Ben Peterson			36																		8
142	Nick White	Wth		38																		6
143	Katherine Legge	39																				5
	Chuck Buchanan Jr.	DNQ																				
	Chase Pinsonneault	DNQ																				
	Robert Martin	DNQ																				

== See also ==
- 2025 NASCAR Cup Series
- 2025 NASCAR Xfinity Series
- 2025 NASCAR Craftsman Truck Series
- 2025 ARCA Menards Series East
- 2025 ARCA Menards Series West
- 2025 NASCAR Whelen Modified Tour
- 2025 NASCAR Canada Series
- 2025 NASCAR Mexico Series
- 2025 NASCAR Euro Series
- 2025 NASCAR Brasil Series
- 2025 CARS Tour
- 2025 SMART Modified Tour
- 2025 ASA STARS National Tour
