= Conner Popplewell =

American racing driver

- Born: December 12, 2003 (age 22); Jeffersonville, Indiana, U.S.

ARCA Menards Series career
- 2 races run over 2 years
- Best finish: 73rd (2023)
- First race: 2023 Atlas 200 (Salem)
- Last race: 2025 Kentuckiana Ford Dealers 200 (Salem)
Wins	Top tens	Poles
0	2	0
- Statistics up to date as of September 20, 2025.

Conner Popplewell (born December 12, 2003) is an American professional stock car racing driver who last competed part-time in the ARCA Menards Series, driving the No. 95 Toyota for MAN Motorsports.

== Racing career ==
Popplewell has previously raced in the CRA Street Stock Series, and has competed in various racing events at Salem Speedway.

In 2023, it was revealed that Popplewell would make his ARCA Menards Series debut at Salem Speedway, driving the No. 95 Toyota for MAN Motorsports. After placing fourth in the sole practice session, Popplewell went on to qualify in ninth and finish in fifth, two laps down behind race winner Jesse Love.

In 2025, it was revealed that Popplewell would return to ARCA at Salem, once again driving the No. 95 Toyota for MAN Motorsports.

== Motorsports results ==
=== Stock car career summary ===
Season	Series	Team	Races	Wins	Top 5	Top 10	Points	Position
2023	ARCA Menards Series	MAN Motorsports	1	0	1	1	39	73rd
2025	ARCA Menards Series	MAN Motorsports	1	0	0	1	36	98th
2026	CARS Pro Late Model Tour	Connor Popplewell Racing	1	0	0	0	21	68th

=== ARCA Menards Series ===
(key) (Bold – Pole position awarded by qualifying time. Italics – Pole position earned by points standings or practice time. * – Most laps led.)

ARCA Menards Series results
Year	Team	No.	Make	1	2	3	4	5	6	7	8	9	10	11	12	13	14	15	16	17	18	19	20	AMSC	Pts	Ref
2023	MAN Motorsports	95	Toyota	DAY	PHO	TAL	KAN	CLT	BLN	ELK	MOH	IOW	POC	MCH	IRP	GLN	ISF	MLW	DSF	KAN	BRI	SLM; 5	TOL	73rd	39	
2025	MAN Motorsports	95	Toyota	DAY	PHO	TAL	KAN	CLT	MCH	BLN	ELK	LRP	DOV	IRP	IOW	GLN	ISF	MAD	DSF	BRI	SLM; 8	KAN	TOL	98th	36	

=== CARS Pro Late Model Tour ===
(key)

CARS Pro Late Model Tour results
Year	Team	No.	Make	1	2	3	4	5	6	7	8	9	10	11	CPLMTC	Pts	Ref
2026	Conner Popplewell Racing	19	N/A	SNM	NSV; 21	CRW	ACE	NWS	HCY	AND	FLC	TCM	NPS	SBO	68th	21	
