= 2025 Reese's 150 =

19th race of the 2025 ARCA Menards Series

Race details
- Race 19 of 20 of the 2025 ARCA Menards Series
- Date: September 26, 2025
- Official name: 25th Annual Reese's 150
- Location: Kansas Speedway in Kansas City, Kansas
- Course: Permanent racing facility
- Course length: 1.5 miles (2.4 km)
- Distance: 110 laps, 165 mi (265 km)
- Scheduled distance: 100 laps, 150 mi (241 km)
- Average speed: 101.782 mph (163.802 km/h)

Pole position
Driver	Brenden Queen	Pinnacle Racing Group
- Time: 31.059

Most laps led
Driver	Gio Ruggiero	Joe Gibbs Racing
- Laps: 74

Winner
No. 28	Brenden Queen	Pinnacle Racing Group

Television in the United States
- Network: FS1
- Announcers: Eric Brennan, Phil Parsons, Trevor Bayne

Radio in the United States
- Radio: MRN

The 2025 Reese's 150 was the 19th stock car race of the 2025 ARCA Menards Series season, and the 25th iteration of the event. The race was held on Friday, September 26, 2025, at Kansas Speedway in Kansas City, Kansas, a 1.5 mile (2.4 km) permanent tri-oval shaped racetrack. The race was contested over 110 laps, extended from 100 laps due to numerous overtime attempts. Brenden Queen, driving for Pinnacle Racing Group, would take the lead late from the dominating Gio Ruggiero, and survived two overtime restarts to earn his eighth career ARCA Menards Series win, and his second consecutive win. Ruggiero dominated the majority of the race, leading a race-high 74 laps before being passed by Queen with just over 10 laps to go. To fill out the podium, Leland Honeyman, driving for Venturini Motorsports, would finish in 3rd, respectively.

== Report ==
=== Background ===
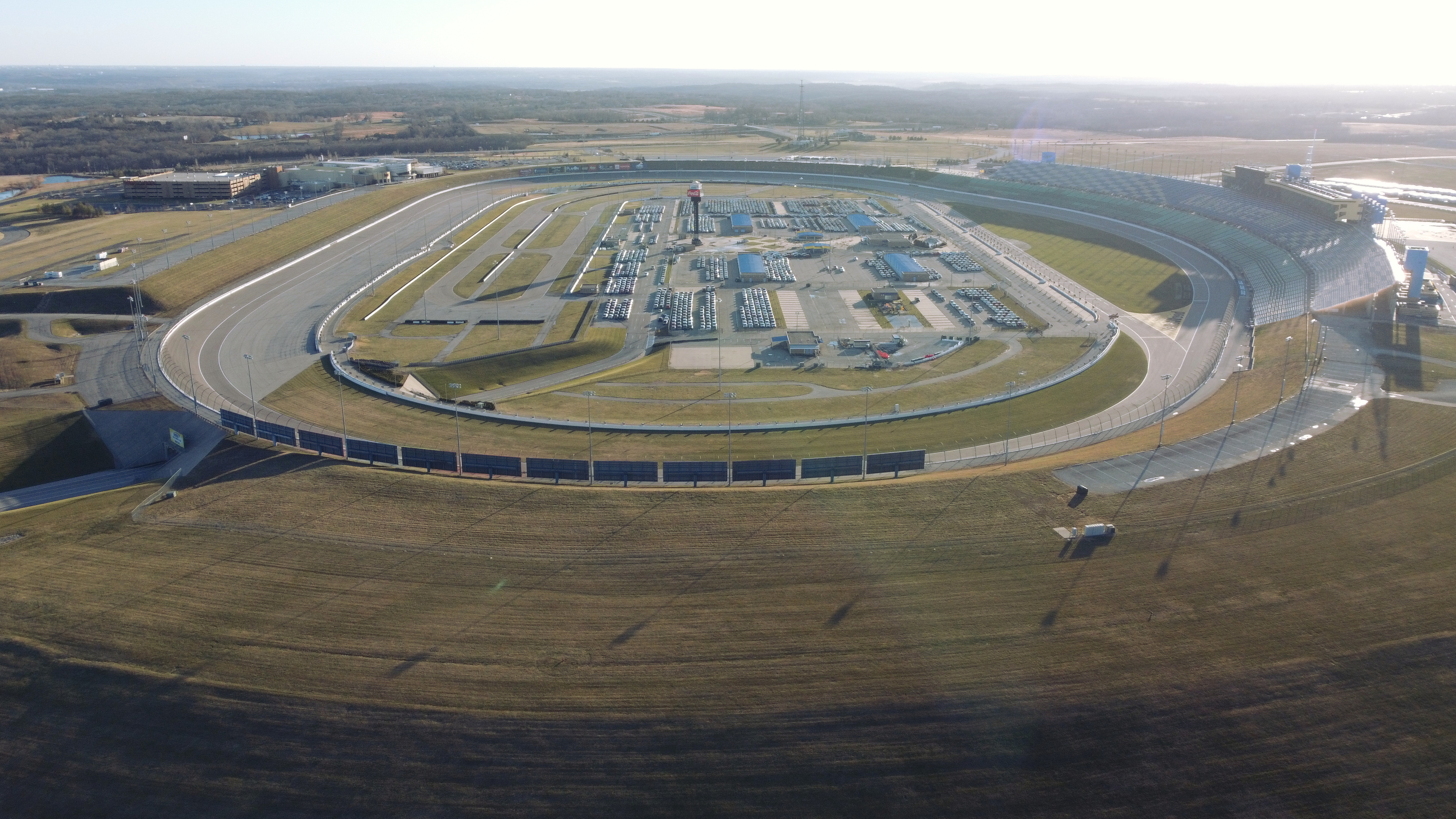
Kansas Speedway, the track where the race will be held.

Kansas Speedway is a 1.5-mile (2.4 km) tri-oval race track in Kansas City, Kansas. It was built in 2001 and it currently hosts two annual NASCAR race weekends. The IndyCar Series also raced at here until 2011. The speedway is owned and operated by the International Speedway Corporation.

==== Entry list ====
- (R) denotes rookie driver.

#	Driver	Team	Make
0	Kevin Hinckle	Wayne Peterson Racing	Chevrolet
2	Eloy Falcón	Rev Racing	Chevrolet
03	Jeff Maconi	Clubb Racing Inc.	Ford
06	Brayton Laster (R)	Wayne Peterson Racing	Ford
6	Lavar Scott	Rev Racing	Chevrolet
7	Eric Caudell	CCM Racing	Toyota
9	Matt Kemp	Fast Track Racing	Toyota
10	Ed Pompa	Fast Track Racing	Ford
11	Tony Cosentino	Fast Track Racing	Ford
12	Takuma Koga	Fast Track Racing	Toyota
15	Kris Wright	Venturini Motorsports	Toyota
17	Patrick Staropoli	Cook Racing Technologies	Toyota
18	Gio Ruggiero	Joe Gibbs Racing	Toyota
20	Leland Honeyman	Venturini Motorsports	Toyota
23	Tyler Reif	Sigma Performance Services	Chevrolet
25	Mason Mitchell	Venturini Motorsports	Toyota
28	Brenden Queen (R)	Pinnacle Racing Group	Chevrolet
31	Bobby Dale Earnhardt	Rise Motorsports	Toyota
40	Andrew Patterson	Andrew Patterson Racing	Chevrolet
46	Thad Moffitt	Nitro Motorsports	Toyota
48	Brad Smith	Brad Smith Motorsports	Ford
55	Isabella Robusto (R)	Venturini Motorsports	Toyota
67	Ryan Roulette	Maples Motorsports	Ford
70	Taylor Reimer	Nitro Motorsports	Toyota
73	Andy Jankowiak	KLAS Motorsports	Toyota
77	Corey Day	Spire Motorsports	Chevrolet
86	Alex Clubb	Clubb Racing Inc.	Ford
97	Jason Kitzmiller	CR7 Motorsports	Chevrolet
99	Michael Maples	Maples Motorsports	Chevrolet
Official entry list

== Practice ==
The first and only practice session was held on Friday, September 26, at 3:30 PM CST, and would last for 45 minutes. Brenden Queen, driving for Pinnacle Racing Group, would set the fastest time in the session, with a lap of 31.283, and a speed of 172.618 mph (277.802 km/h).

Pos.	#	Driver	Team	Make	Time	Speed
1	28	Brenden Queen (R)	Pinnacle Racing Group	Chevrolet	31.283	172.618
2	18	Gio Ruggiero	Joe Gibbs Racing	Toyota	31.348	172.260
3	20	Leland Honeyman	Venturini Motorsports	Toyota	31.401	171.969
Full practice results

== Qualifying ==
Qualifying was held on Friday, September 26, at 4:40 PM CST. The qualifying procedure used is a multi-car, multi-lap based system. All drivers will be on track for a 20-minute timed session, and whoever sets the fastest time in that session will win the pole.

Brenden Queen, driving for Pinnacle Racing Group, would score the pole for the race, with a lap of 31.059, and a speed of 173.863 mph (279.805 km/h).

=== Qualifying results ===
Pos.	#	Driver	Team	Make	Time	Speed
1	28	Brenden Queen (R)	Pinnacle Racing Group	Chevrolet	31.059	173.863
2	18	Gio Ruggiero	Joe Gibbs Racing	Toyota	31.186	173.155
3	20	Leland Honeyman	Venturini Motorsports	Toyota	31.232	172.900
4	77	Corey Day	Spire Motorsports	Chevrolet	31.412	171.909
5	46	Thad Moffitt	Nitro Motorsports	Toyota	31.425	171.838
6	55	Isabella Robusto (R)	Venturini Motorsports	Toyota	31.483	171.521
7	25	Mason Mitchell	Venturini Motorsports	Toyota	31.578	171.005
8	6	Lavar Scott	Rev Racing	Chevrolet	31.584	170.973
9	15	Kris Wright	Venturini Motorsports	Toyota	31.624	170.756
10	97	Jason Kitzmiller	CR7 Motorsports	Chevrolet	31.736	170.154
11	73	Andy Jankowiak	KLAS Motorsports	Toyota	31.773	169.956
12	40	Andrew Patterson	Andrew Patterson Racing	Chevrolet	31.823	169.689
13	70	Taylor Reimer	Nitro Motorsports	Toyota	31.895	169.306
14	17	Patrick Staropoli	Cook Racing Technologies	Toyota	31.924	169.152
15	23	Tyler Reif	Sigma Performance Services	Chevrolet	32.459	166.364
16	2	Eloy Falcón	Rev Racing	Chevrolet	32.528	166.011
17	31	Bobby Dale Earnhardt	Rise Motorsports	Toyota	33.354	161.900
18	12	Takuma Koga	Fast Track Racing	Toyota	33.684	160.314
19	99	Michael Maples	Maples Motorsports	Chevrolet	34.283	157.512
20	11	Tony Cosentino	Fast Track Racing	Ford	34.503	156.508
21	03	Jeff Maconi	Clubb Racing Inc.	Ford	34.851	154.945
22	9	Matt Kemp	Fast Track Racing	Toyota	34.999	154.290
23	0	Kevin Hinckle	Wayne Peterson Racing	Chevrolet	36.051	149.788
24	48	Brad Smith	Brad Smith Motorsports	Ford	36.424	148.254
25	7	Eric Caudell	CCM Racing	Toyota	36.650	147.340
26	06	Brayton Laster (R)	Wayne Peterson Racing	Ford	36.837	146.592
27	86	Alex Clubb	Clubb Racing Inc.	Ford	37.688	143.282
28	10	Ed Pompa	Fast Track Racing	Ford	39.546	136.550
29	67	Ryan Roulette	Maples Motorsports	Ford	–	–
Official qualifying results

== Race results ==
Fin	St	#	Driver	Team	Make	Laps	Led	Status	Pts
1	1	28	Brenden Queen (R)	Pinnacle Racing Group	Chevrolet	110	35	Running	48
2	2	18	Gio Ruggiero	Joe Gibbs Racing	Toyota	110	74	Running	44
3	3	20	Leland Honeyman	Venturini Motorsports	Toyota	110	0	Running	41
4	9	15	Kris Wright	Venturini Motorsports	Toyota	110	0	Running	40
5	13	70	Taylor Reimer	Nitro Motorsports	Toyota	110	0	Running	39
6	7	25	Mason Mitchell	Venturini Motorsports	Toyota	110	0	Running	38
7	5	46	Thad Moffitt	Nitro Motorsports	Toyota	110	0	Running	37
8	12	40	Andrew Patterson	Andrew Patterson Racing	Chevrolet	110	0	Running	36
9	10	97	Jason Kitzmiller	CR7 Motorsports	Chevrolet	110	0	Running	35
10	6	55	Isabella Robusto (R)	Venturini Motorsports	Toyota	110	0	Running	34
11	14	17	Patrick Staropoli	Cook Racing Technologies	Toyota	110	0	Running	33
12	16	2	Eloy Falcón	Rev Racing	Chevrolet	110	0	Running	32
13	15	23	Tyler Reif	Sigma Performance Services	Chevrolet	109	0	Running	31
14	29	67	Ryan Roulette	Maples Motorsports	Ford	107	0	Running	30
15	20	11	Tony Cosentino	Fast Track Racing	Ford	106	0	Running	29
16	18	12	Takuma Koga	Fast Track Racing	Toyota	106	0	Running	28
17	25	7	Eric Caudell	CCM Racing	Toyota	101	0	Running	27
18	11	73	Andy Jankowiak	KLAS Motorsports	Toyota	100	0	Accident	26
19	27	86	Alex Clubb	Clubb Racing Inc.	Ford	100	0	Running	25
20	21	03	Jeff Maconi	Clubb Racing Inc.	Ford	99	0	Running	24
21	26	06	Brayton Laster (R)	Wayne Peterson Racing	Ford	98	0	Running	23
22	19	99	Michael Maples	Maples Motorsports	Chevrolet	93	0	Running	22
23	4	77	Corey Day	Spire Motorsports	Chevrolet	79	1	Mechanical	22
24	24	48	Brad Smith	Brad Smith Motorsports	Ford	68	0	Mechanical	20
25	8	6	Lavar Scott	Rev Racing	Chevrolet	47	0	Accident	19
26	17	31	Bobby Dale Earnhardt	Rise Motorsports	Toyota	27	0	Accident	18
27	28	10	Ed Pompa	Fast Track Racing	Ford	16	0	Mechanical	17
28	23	0	Kevin Hinckle	Wayne Peterson Racing	Chevrolet	13	0	Mechanical	16
29	22	9	Matt Kemp	Fast Track Racing	Toyota	9	0	Mechanical	15
Official race results

== Standings after the race ==
Drivers' Championship standings

	Pos	Driver	Points
	1	Brenden Queen	941
	2	Lavar Scott	856 (–85)
1	3	Jason Kitzmiller	769 (–172)
1	4	Isabella Robusto	756 (–185)
2	5	Lawless Alan	744 (–197)
	6	Alex Clubb	664 (–277)
	7	Michael Maples	647 (–294)
	8	Brayton Laster	622 (–319)
	9	Brad Smith	498 (–443)
1	10	Tony Cosentino	370 (–571)

- Note: Only the first 10 positions are included for the driver standings.

Previous race: 2025 Kentuckiana Ford Dealers ARCA 200	ARCA Menards Series; 2025 season	Next race: 2025 Owens Corning 200
