= Chris Golden =

American racing driver

- Born: November 5, 1990 (age 36); Elk City, Oklahoma, U.S.

ARCA Menards Series career
- 5 races run over 2 years
- Best finish: 59th (2024)
- First race: 2024 Zinsser SmartCoat 150 (Mid-Ohio)
- Last race: 2025 Kentuckiana Ford Dealers 200 (Salem)
Wins	Top tens	Poles
0	0	0
- Statistics up to date as of September 20, 2025.

Chris Golden (born November 5, 1990) is an American professional stock car racing driver who last competed part-time in the ARCA Menards Series, driving the No. 03/86 Ford for Clubb Racing Inc.

== Racing career ==
Golden has previously competed in series such as the Sooner Limited Modified Series, as well as the United States Racing Association in both the limited modified and tuner divisions.

In 2023, Golden was entered in the ARCA Menards Series race at the DuQuoin State Fairgrounds dirt track in the No. 03 Ford, but only practiced and qualified the car for team owner Alex Clubb; Golden placed seventeenth in both practice and qualifying while Clubb finished the race in ninth place.

In 2024, it was revealed that Golden would officially make his debut in ARCA for Clubb, this time driving the No. 86 Ford at the Mid-Ohio Sports Car Course. He finished in 25th after failing to take the start due to mechanical issues. He then finished in nineteenth at the next race at Berlin Raceway, and 25th at Salem Speedway, retiring from both due to mechanical issues.

== Motorsports results ==
=== ARCA Menards Series ===
(key) (Bold – Pole position awarded by qualifying time. Italics – Pole position earned by points standings or practice time. * – Most laps led.)

ARCA Menards Series results
Year	Team	No.	Make	1	2	3	4	5	6	7	8	9	10	11	12	13	14	15	16	17	18	19	20	AMSC	Pts	Ref
2023	Clubb Racing Inc.	03	Ford	DAY	PHO	TAL	KAN	CLT	BLN	ELK	MOH	IOW	POC	MCH	IRP	GLN	ISF	MLW	DSF; QL^{†}	KAN	BRI	SLM	TOL	N/A	0	
2024	Clubb Racing Inc.	86	Ford	DAY	PHO	TAL	DOV	KAN	CLT	IOW	MOH; 25	BLN; 19	IRP	SLM; 25	ELK	MCH	ISF	MLW	DSF	GLN	BRI	KAN	TOL	59th	63	
2025	Clubb Racing Inc.	86	Ford	DAY	PHO	TAL	KAN	CLT	MCH	BLN; 19	ELK	LRP	DOV	IRP	IOW	GLN	ISF	MAD	DSF	BRI				82nd	48	
2025	Clubb Racing Inc.	03	Ford																		SLM; 21	KAN	TOL	82nd	48	
^{†} - Qualified for Alex Clubb
