= Trevor Ward (racing driver, born 2004) =

American racing driver

- Born: February 3, 2004 (age 22); Harrison, Maine, U.S.

ARCA Menards Series career
- 8 races run over 1 year
- Best finish: 21st (2025)
- First race: 2025 Berlin ARCA 200 (Berlin)
- Last race: 2025 Southern Illinois 100 (DuQuoin)
Wins	Top tens	Poles
0	0	0

ARCA Menards Series East career
- 2 races run over 1 year
- Best finish: 45th (2025)
- First race: 2025 Dutch Boy 150 (Flat Rock)
- Last race: 2025 Atlas 150 (Iowa)
Wins	Top tens	Poles
0	0	0
- Statistics up to date as of September 16, 2025.

Trevor Ward (born February 3, 2004) is an American professional stock car racing driver and crew member who last competed part-time in the ARCA Menards Series, driving the No. 01/9/12 Ford/Toyota for Fast Track Racing.

== Racing career ==
In 2025, Ward made his debut in the ARCA Menards Series East at Flat Rock Speedway, driving the No. 9 Toyota for Fast Track Racing. After placing fourteenth in the lone practice session, he qualified in seventh but finished in fourteenth due to mechanical issues.

Ward then made his debut in the main ARCA Menards Series at Berlin Raceway, this time driving the No. 12 Ford for FTR, where he finished in 23rd, once again due to mechanical issues. He then finished in 24th at the next race at Elko Speedway, where he also served as a pit-crew member for teammate Bryce Haugeberg. Ward then raced the following event at Lime Rock Park, where he finished in 22nd. After not racing in the next two races, he returned at Iowa Speedway, where he finished in 26th due to mechanical issues. He then ran the next four races, finishing 25th at Watkins Glen International, seventeenth at the Illinois State Fairgrounds, 21st at Madison International Speedway, and twentieth at the DuQuoin State Fairgrounds.

== Motorsports results ==
=== ARCA Menards Series ===
(key) (Bold – Pole position awarded by qualifying time. Italics – Pole position earned by points standings or practice time. * – Most laps led.)

ARCA Menards Series results
Year	Team	No.	Make	1	2	3	4	5	6	7	8	9	10	11	12	13	14	15	16	17	18	19	20	AMSC	Pts	Ref
2025	Fast Track Racing	12	Ford	DAY	PHO	TAL	KAN	CLT	MCH	BLN; 23														21st	174	
2025	Fast Track Racing	12	Toyota								ELK; 24	LRP; 22	DOV	IRP										21st	174	
2025	Fast Track Racing	01	Toyota												IOW; 26									21st	174	
2025	Fast Track Racing	9	Toyota													GLN; 25	ISF; 17	MAD; 21	DSF; 20	BRI	SLM	KAN	TOL	21st	174	

==== ARCA Menards Series East ====
ARCA Menards Series East results
Year	Team	No.	Make	1	2	3	4	5	6	7	8	AMSEC	Pts	Ref
2025	Fast Track Racing	9	Toyota	FIF	CAR	NSV	FRS; 14	DOV	IRP			45th	48	
2025	Fast Track Racing	01	Toyota							IOW; 26	BRI	45th	48	
