= 2026 Black's Tire 200 (Rockingham) =

NASCAR Craftsman Truck Series race at Rockingham Speedway

Race details
- Race 5 of 25 in the 2026 NASCAR Craftsman Truck Series
- Date: April 3, 2026
- Location: Rockingham Speedway in Rockingham, North Carolina
- Course: Permanent racing facility
- Course length: 0.940 miles (1.513 km)
- Distance: 200 laps, 188 mi (303 km)
- Average speed: 106.415 miles per hour (171.258 km/h)

Pole position
Driver	Jake Garcia	ThorSport Racing
- Time: 21.893

Most laps led
Driver	Corey Heim	Tricon Garage
- Laps: 178

Fastest lap
Driver	Corey Heim	Tricon Garage
- Time: 22.965

Winner
No. 1	Corey Heim	Tricon Garage

Television in the United States
- Network: FS1
- Announcers: Jamie Little, Phil Parsons, and Regan Smith

Radio in the United States
- Radio: NRN
- Booth announcers: Alex Hayden and Kyle Rickey
- Turn announcers: Tim Catafalmo (1 & 2) and Nathan Prowdi (3 & 4)

The 2026 Black's Tire 200 was a NASCAR Craftsman Truck Series race held on April 3, 2026, at Rockingham Speedway in Rockingham, North Carolina. Contested over 200 laps on the 0.940-mile (1.513 km) asphalt speedway, it was the fifth race of the 2026 NASCAR Craftsman Truck Series season, and the second running of the event.

Corey Heim, driving for Tricon Garage, continued to show his dominance in the Truck Series ranks, sweeping the stages and leading all but 22 laps while holding off a charging Kaden Honeycutt and Layne Riggs to earn his 25th career NASCAR Craftsman Truck Series win, and his second of the season. Honeycutt finished second, and Riggs finished third. Stewart Friesen and Grant Enfinger rounded out the top five, while Tyler Ankrum, Corey LaJoie, Ty Majeski, Jake Garcia, and Cole Butcher rounded out the top ten.

This was the second of three races in the Triple Truck Challenge. Heim won the race and was granted $100K, becoming only the second driver to win two races in the challenge.

Chandler Smith, who originally finished in fourth, was disqualified after failing post-race inspection. He was later credited with a 36th place finish.

== Report ==
=== Background ===
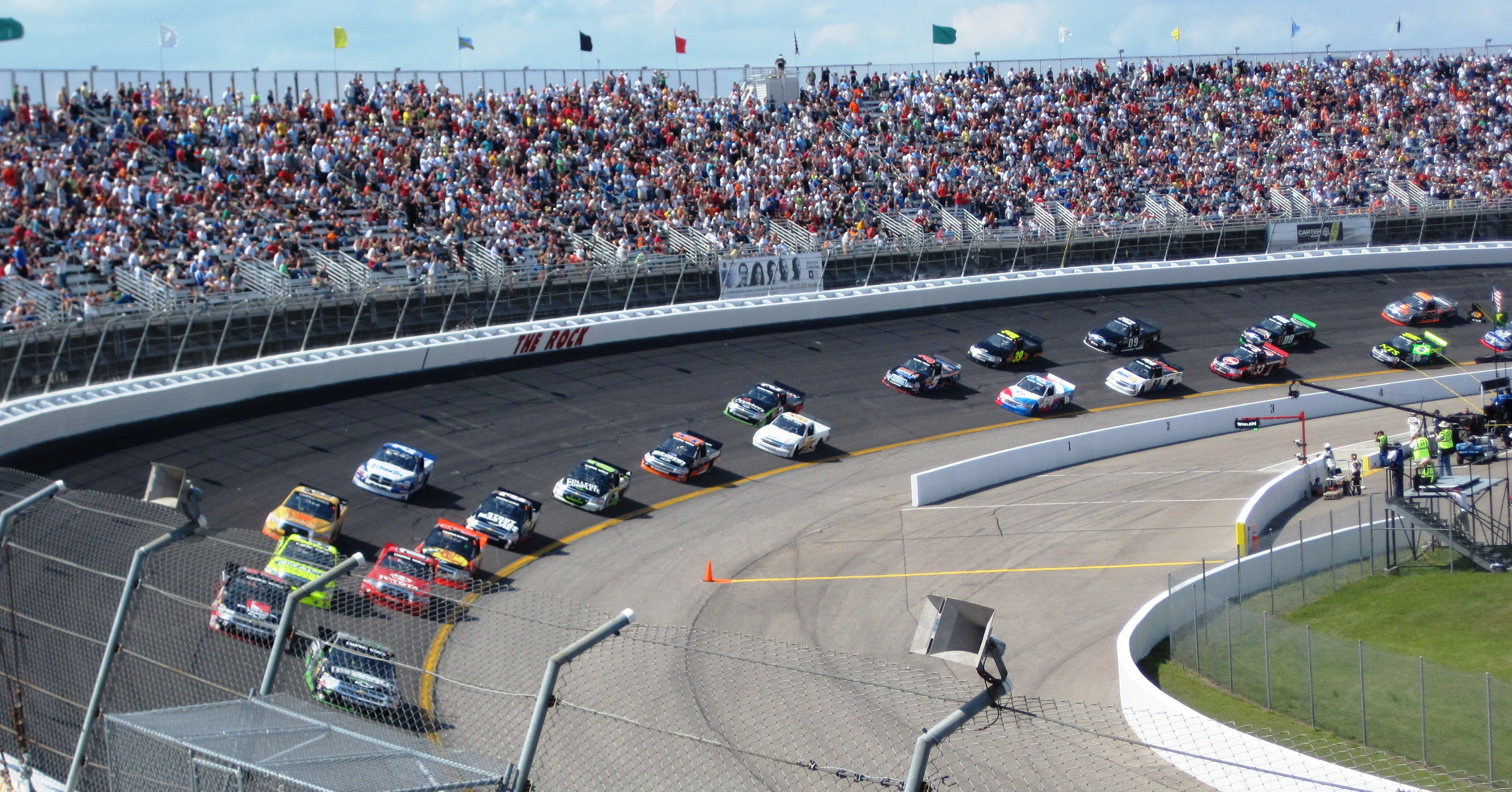
Rockingham Speedway, the track where the race was held.

Rockingham Speedway and Entertainment Complex (formerly known as North Carolina Speedway from 1998 to 2007 and North Carolina Motor Speedway from 1965 to 1996) is a 0.94 mi (1.51 km) D-shaped oval track in Rockingham, North Carolina. The track has held a variety of events since its opening in 1965, including the NASCAR Cup Series from 1965 to 2004, and currently the NASCAR O'Reilly Auto Parts Series, NASCAR Craftsman Truck Series, and the ARCA Menards Series East. It has a 32,000-seat capacity as of 2012. Rockingham Speedway is owned by the International Hot Rod Association (IHRA).

==== Entry list ====
- (R) denotes rookie driver.
- (i) denotes driver who is ineligible for series driver points.

#	Driver	Team	Make
1	Corey Heim	Tricon Garage	Toyota
2	Luke Baldwin	Team Reaume	Ford
4	Connor Hall	Niece Motorsports	Chevrolet
5	Adam Andretti	Tricon Garage	Toyota
7	Sammy Smith (i)	Spire Motorsports	Chevrolet
9	Grant Enfinger	CR7 Motorsports	Chevrolet
10	Corey LaJoie	Kaulig Racing	Ram
11	Kaden Honeycutt	Tricon Garage	Toyota
12	Brenden Queen (R)	Kaulig Racing	Ram
13	Cole Butcher (R)	ThorSport Racing	Ford
14	Mini Tyrrell (R)	Kaulig Racing	Ram
15	Tanner Gray	Tricon Garage	Toyota
16	Justin Haley	Kaulig Racing	Ram
17	Gio Ruggiero	Tricon Garage	Toyota
18	Tyler Ankrum	McAnally–Hilgemann Racing	Chevrolet
19	Daniel Hemric	McAnally–Hilgemann Racing	Chevrolet
22	Clayton Green	Team Reaume	Ford
25	Ty Dillon (i)	Kaulig Racing	Ram
26	Dawson Sutton	Rackley W.A.R.	Chevrolet
33	Frankie Muniz	Team Reaume	Ford
34	Layne Riggs	Front Row Motorsports	Ford
38	Chandler Smith	Front Row Motorsports	Ford
42	Parker Eatmon	Niece Motorsports	Chevrolet
44	Andrés Pérez de Lara	Niece Motorsports	Chevrolet
45	Landen Lewis	Niece Motorsports	Chevrolet
52	Stewart Friesen	Halmar Friesen Racing	Toyota
56	Timmy Hill	Hill Motorsports	Toyota
62	Mike Christopher Jr.	Halmar Friesen Racing	Toyota
69	Jonathan Shafer	MBM Motorsports	Ford
76	Spencer Boyd	Freedom Racing Enterprises	Chevrolet
77	Carson Hocevar (i)	Spire Motorsports	Chevrolet
81	Kris Wright	McAnally–Hilgemann Racing	Chevrolet
88	Ty Majeski	ThorSport Racing	Ford
90	Justin Carroll	TC Motorsports	Toyota
91	Christian Eckes	McAnally–Hilgemann Racing	Chevrolet
93	Caleb Costner	Costner Motorsports	Chevrolet
98	Jake Garcia	ThorSport Racing	Ford
99	Ben Rhodes	ThorSport Racing	Ford
Official entry list

== Practice ==
The first and only practice session was held on Friday, April 3, at 11:00 AM EST, and was originally scheduled to run for 50 minutes, but was decreased to 32 minutes due to inclement weather.

Kaden Honeycutt, driving for Tricon Garage, set the fastest time in the session, with a lap of 22.775 seconds, and a speed of 148.584 mph (239.123 km/h).

=== Practice results ===
Pos.	#	Driver	Team	Make	Time	Speed
1	11	Kaden Honeycutt	Tricon Garage	Toyota	22.775	148.584
2	1	Corey Heim	Tricon Garage	Toyota	22.962	147.374
3	44	Andrés Pérez de Lara	Niece Motorsports	Chevrolet	23.050	146.811
Full practice results

== Qualifying ==
Qualifying was held on Friday, April 3, at 12:30 PM EST, delayed from its original 12:05 PM time due to inclement weather. Since Rockingham Speedway is a mile oval, the qualifying procedure used was a single-car, one-lap system with one round. Drivers were on track by themselves and had one lap to post a qualifying time, and whoever set the fastest time won the pole.

Jake Garcia, driving for ThorSport Racing, qualified on pole position with a lap of 21.893 seconds, and a speed of 154.570 mph (248.756 km/h).

Two drivers failed to qualify: Justin Carroll and Jonathan Shafer.

=== Qualifying results ===
Pos.	#	Driver	Team	Make	Time	Speed
1	98	Jake Garcia	ThorSport Racing	Ford	21.893	154.570
2	15	Tanner Gray	Tricon Garage	Toyota	22.101	153.115
3	11	Kaden Honeycutt	Tricon Garage	Toyota	22.122	152.970
4	13	Cole Butcher (R)	ThorSport Racing	Ford	22.181	152.563
5	34	Layne Riggs	Front Row Motorsports	Ford	22.208	152.378
6	88	Ty Majeski	ThorSport Racing	Ford	22.258	152.035
7	1	Corey Heim	Tricon Garage	Toyota	22.264	151.994
8	42	Parker Eatmon	Niece Motorsports	Chevrolet	22.289	151.824
9	45	Landen Lewis	Niece Motorsports	Chevrolet	22.291	151.810
10	17	Gio Ruggiero	Tricon Garage	Toyota	22.328	151.559
11	12	Brenden Queen (R)	Kaulig Racing	Ram	22.328	151.559
12	44	Andrés Pérez de Lara	Niece Motorsports	Chevrolet	22.330	151.545
13	18	Tyler Ankrum	McAnally–Hilgemann Racing	Chevrolet	22.335	151.511
14	9	Grant Enfinger	CR7 Motorsports	Chevrolet	22.336	151.504
15	19	Daniel Hemric	McAnally–Hilgemann Racing	Chevrolet	22.339	151.484
16	77	Carson Hocevar (i)	Spire Motorsports	Chevrolet	22.349	151.416
17	16	Justin Haley	Kaulig Racing	Ram	22.371	151.267
18	26	Dawson Sutton	Rackley W.A.R.	Chevrolet	22.419	150.943
19	52	Stewart Friesen	Halmar Friesen Racing	Toyota	22.444	150.775
20	81	Kris Wright	McAnally–Hilgemann Racing	Chevrolet	22.542	150.120
21	2	Luke Baldwin	Team Reaume	Ford	22.552	150.053
22	91	Christian Eckes	McAnally–Hilgemann Racing	Chevrolet	22.640	149.470
23	10	Corey LaJoie	Kaulig Racing	Ram	22.642	149.457
24	7	Sammy Smith (i)	Spire Motorsports	Chevrolet	22.655	149.371
25	99	Ben Rhodes	ThorSport Racing	Ford	22.705	149.042
26	14	Mini Tyrrell (R)	Kaulig Racing	Ram	22.724	148.917
27	4	Connor Hall	Niece Motorsports	Chevrolet	22.746	148.773
28	25	Ty Dillon (i)	Kaulig Racing	Ram	22.793	148.467
29	5	Adam Andretti	Tricon Garage	Toyota	22.836	148.187
30	62	Mike Christopher Jr.	Halmar Friesen Racing	Toyota	22.844	148.135
31	56	Timmy Hill	Hill Motorsports	Toyota	23.182	145.975
Qualified by owner's points
32	33	Frankie Muniz	Team Reaume	Ford	23.798	142.197
33	38	Chandler Smith	Front Row Motorsports	Ford	24.469	138.297
34	93	Caleb Costner	Costner Motorsports	Chevrolet	24.681	137.110
35	22	Clayton Green	Team Reaume	Ford	—	—
36	76	Spencer Boyd	Freedom Racing Enterprises	Chevrolet	—	—
Failed to qualify
37	90	Justin Carroll	TC Motorsports	Toyota	23.757	142.442
38	69	Jonathan Shafer	MBM Motorsports	Ford	—	—
Official qualifying results
Official starting lineup

== Race ==
=== Race results ===
==== Stage results ====
Stage One Laps: 45

Pos.	#	Driver	Team	Make	Pts
1	1	Corey Heim	Tricon Garage	Toyota	10
2	88	Ty Majeski	ThorSport Racing	Ford	9
3	11	Kaden Honeycutt	Tricon Garage	Toyota	8
4	34	Layne Riggs	Front Row Motorsports	Ford	7
5	15	Tanner Gray	Tricon Garage	Toyota	6
6	13	Cole Butcher (R)	ThorSport Racing	Ford	5
7	98	Jake Garcia	ThorSport Racing	Ford	4
8	42	Parker Eatmon	Niece Motorsports	Chevrolet	3
9	17	Gio Ruggiero	Tricon Garage	Toyota	2
10	45	Landen Lewis	Niece Motorsports	Chevrolet	1

Stage Two Laps: 45

Pos.	#	Driver	Team	Make	Pts
1	1	Corey Heim	Tricon Garage	Toyota	10
2	88	Ty Majeski	ThorSport Racing	Ford	9
3	11	Kaden Honeycutt	Tricon Garage	Toyota	8
4	34	Layne Riggs	Front Row Motorsports	Ford	7
5	9	Grant Enfinger	CR7 Motorsports	Chevrolet	6
6	15	Tanner Gray	Tricon Garage	Toyota	5
7	52	Stewart Friesen	Halmar Friesen Racing	Toyota	4
8	19	Daniel Hemric	McAnally–Hilgemann Racing	Chevrolet	3
9	13	Cole Butcher (R)	ThorSport Racing	Ford	2
10	98	Jake Garcia	ThorSport Racing	Ford	1

=== Final Stage results ===
Stage Three Laps: 110

Fin	St	#	Driver	Team	Make	Laps	Led	Status	Pts
1	7	1	Corey Heim	Tricon Garage	Toyota	200	178	Running	76
2	3	11	Kaden Honeycutt	Tricon Garage	Toyota	200	1	Running	51
3	5	34	Layne Riggs	Front Row Motorsports	Ford	200	0	Running	48
4	19	52	Stewart Friesen	Halmar Friesen Racing	Toyota	200	0	Running	37
5	14	9	Grant Enfinger	CR7 Motorsports	Chevrolet	200	4	Running	38
6	13	18	Tyler Ankrum	McAnally–Hilgemann Racing	Chevrolet	200	0	Running	31
7	23	10	Corey LaJoie	Kaulig Racing	Ram	200	0	Running	30
8	6	88	Ty Majeski	ThorSport Racing	Ford	200	0	Running	47
9	1	98	Jake Garcia	ThorSport Racing	Ford	199	0	Running	33
10	4	13	Cole Butcher (R)	ThorSport Racing	Ford	199	0	Running	34
11	24	7	Sammy Smith (i)	Spire Motorsports	Chevrolet	199	0	Running	0
12	17	16	Justin Haley	Kaulig Racing	Ram	199	0	Running	25
13	22	91	Christian Eckes	McAnally–Hilgemann Racing	Chevrolet	199	0	Running	25
14	9	45	Landen Lewis	Niece Motorsports	Chevrolet	199	0	Running	24
15	18	26	Dawson Sutton	Rackley W.A.R.	Chevrolet	199	0	Running	22
16	2	15	Tanner Gray	Tricon Garage	Toyota	198	17	Running	32
17	10	17	Gio Ruggiero	Tricon Garage	Toyota	198	0	Running	22
18	25	99	Ben Rhodes	ThorSport Racing	Ford	198	0	Running	19
19	20	81	Kris Wright	McAnally–Hilgemann Racing	Chevrolet	198	0	Running	18
20	27	4	Connor Hall	Niece Motorsports	Chevrolet	198	0	Running	17
21	21	2	Luke Baldwin	Team Reaume	Ford	198	0	Running	16
22	28	25	Ty Dillon (i)	Kaulig Racing	Ram	197	0	Running	0
23	30	62	Mike Christopher Jr.	Halmar Friesen Racing	Toyota	197	0	Running	14
24	15	19	Daniel Hemric	McAnally–Hilgemann Racing	Chevrolet	197	0	Running	16
25	26	14	Mini Tyrrell (R)	Kaulig Racing	Ram	197	0	Running	12
26	8	42	Parker Eatmon	Niece Motorsports	Chevrolet	197	0	Running	14
27	11	12	Brenden Queen (R)	Kaulig Racing	Ram	196	0	Running	10
28	36	76	Spencer Boyd	Freedom Racing Enterprises	Chevrolet	195	0	Running	9
29	35	22	Clayton Green	Team Reaume	Ford	195	0	Running	8
30	31	56	Timmy Hill	Hill Motorsports	Toyota	194	0	Running	7
31	32	33	Frankie Muniz	Team Reaume	Ford	192	0	Running	6
32	12	44	Andrés Pérez de Lara	Niece Motorsports	Chevrolet	187	0	Running	5
33	34	93	Caleb Costner	Costner Motorsports	Chevrolet	187	0	Running	4
34	16	77	Carson Hocevar (i)	Spire Motorsports	Chevrolet	116	0	Drivetrain	0
35	29	5	Adam Andretti	Tricon Garage	Toyota	58	0	Accident	2
DSQ	33	38	Chandler Smith	Front Row Motorsports	Ford	200	0	Running	1
Official race results

=== Race statistics ===
- Lead changes: 6 among 4 different drivers
- Cautions/Laps: 4 for 28 laps
- Red flags: 0
- Time of race: 1 hour, 46 minutes and 0 seconds
- Average speed: 106.415 miles per hour (171.258 km/h)

== Standings after the race ==
Drivers' Championship standings

	Pos	Driver	Points
7	1	Corey Heim	190
	2	Kaden Honeycutt	190 (–0)
	3	Layne Riggs	179 (–11)
3	4	Chandler Smith	173 (–17)
	5	Ty Majeski	168 (–22)
2	6	Gio Ruggiero	149 (–41)
1	7	Christian Eckes	143 (–47)
1	8	Ben Rhodes	138 (–52)
4	9	Stewart Friesen	119 (–71)
	10	Justin Haley	114 (–76)
Official driver's standings

Manufacturers' Championship standings

	Pos	Manufacturer	Points
1	1	Toyota	211
1	2	Ford	202 (–9)
1	3	Chevrolet	187 (–24)
	4	Ram	141 (–70)

- Note: Only the first 10 positions are included for the driver standings.

Previous race: 2026 Buckle Up South Carolina 200	NASCAR Craftsman Truck Series; 2026 season	Next race: 2026 Tennessee Army National Guard 250
