= Andrés Pérez de Lara =

Mexican racing driver (born 2005)

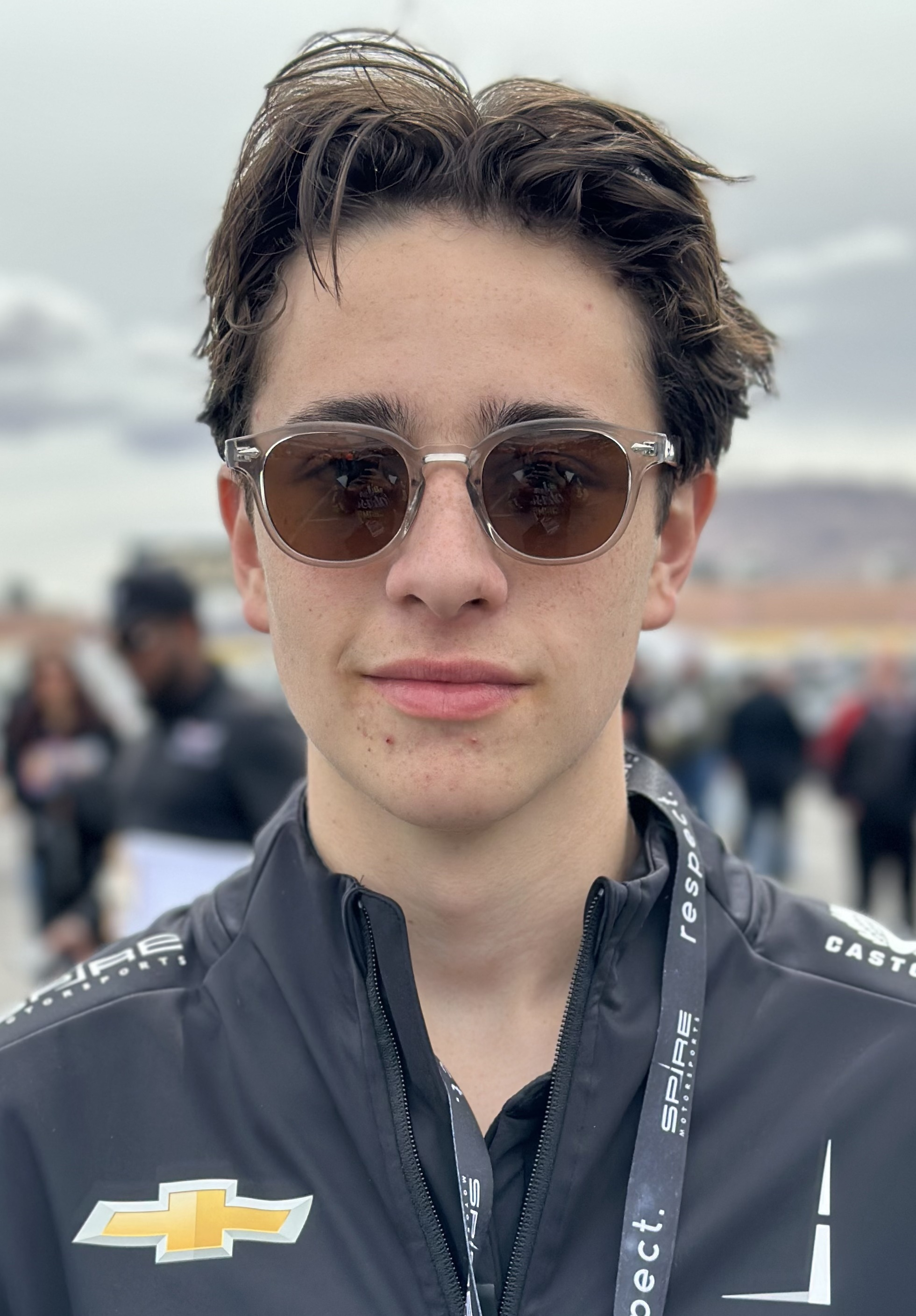
- Pérez de Lara at Las Vegas Motor Speedway in 2025
- Born: Andrés Pérez de Lara González; April 2, 2005 (age 21); Mexico City, Mexico
- Achievements: 2024 ARCA Menards Series Champion

NASCAR O'Reilly Auto Parts Series career
- 1 race run over 1 year
- 2025 position: 101st
- Best finish: 101st (2025)
- First race: 2025 The Chilango 150 (Mexico City)
Wins	Top tens	Poles
0	0	0

NASCAR FedEx Freight Truck Series career
- 52 races run over 3 years
- Truck no., team: No. 44 (Niece Motorsports)
- 2026 position: 16th
- Best finish: 16th (2025, 2026)
- First race: 2024 Toyota 200 (Gateway)
- Last race: 2026 Craftsman 200 (Homestead)
Wins	Top tens	Poles
0	8	0

ARCA Menards Series career
- 41 races run over 3 years
- Best finish: 1st (2024)
- First race: 2022 Bush's Beans 200 (Bristol)
- Last race: 2024 Owens Corning 200 (Toledo)
Wins	Top tens	Poles
0	33	3

ARCA Menards Series East career
- 10 races run over 3 years
- Best finish: 9th (2024)
- First race: 2022 Bush's Beans 200 (Bristol)
- Last race: 2024 Bush's Beans 200 (Bristol)
Wins	Top tens	Poles
0	10	0

ARCA Menards Series West career
- 4 races run over 3 years
- Best finish: 25th (2022)
- First race: 2022 Star Nursery 150 (Las Vegas Bullring)
- Last race: 2024 General Tire 150 (Phoenix)
Wins	Top tens	Poles
0	4	0
- Statistics up to date as of November 6, 2026.

Andrés Pérez de Lara González (born April 2, 2005) is a Mexican professional stock car racing driver. He competes full-time in the NASCAR Craftsman Truck Series, driving the No. 44 Chevrolet Silverado RST for Niece Motorsports. He is the 2024 ARCA Menards Series champion, the 2020 NASCAR Mikel's Truck Series champion, and the 2022 NASCAR Mexico Challenge Series champion. He has previously competed in the NASCAR Xfinity Series, ARCA Menards Series, ARCA Menards Series East, and ARCA Menards Series West.

== Racing career ==
In 2019, at the age of fourteen, Pérez de Lara competed in the NACAM Formula 4 Championship alongside his brother, Pablo, at Telcel RPL Racing. He won four races, being the youngest to do so, on route to third in the championship and rookie of the year honors.

In 2020, Pérez de Lara ran in the NASCAR Mikel's Truck Series in Mexico, where he won the championship at the age of fifteen.

In 2021, Pérez de Lara ran the full season in the NASCAR FedEx Challenge Series after running one race at Nuevo Autódromo de Quéretaro in the previous year. He finished fourth in the points that year, finishing in the top five in eight races.

In 2022, Pérez de Lara returned to the series, where he became the youngest winner in the series at Querétaro Race Track at the age of seventeen on route to win the championship. It was also during this year that Pérez de Lara was chosen for the NASCAR Drive for Diversity program, and he made select events in the ARCA Menards Series, ARCA Menards Series East and ARCA Menards Series West driving for David Gilliland Racing.

=== ARCA Menards Series ===
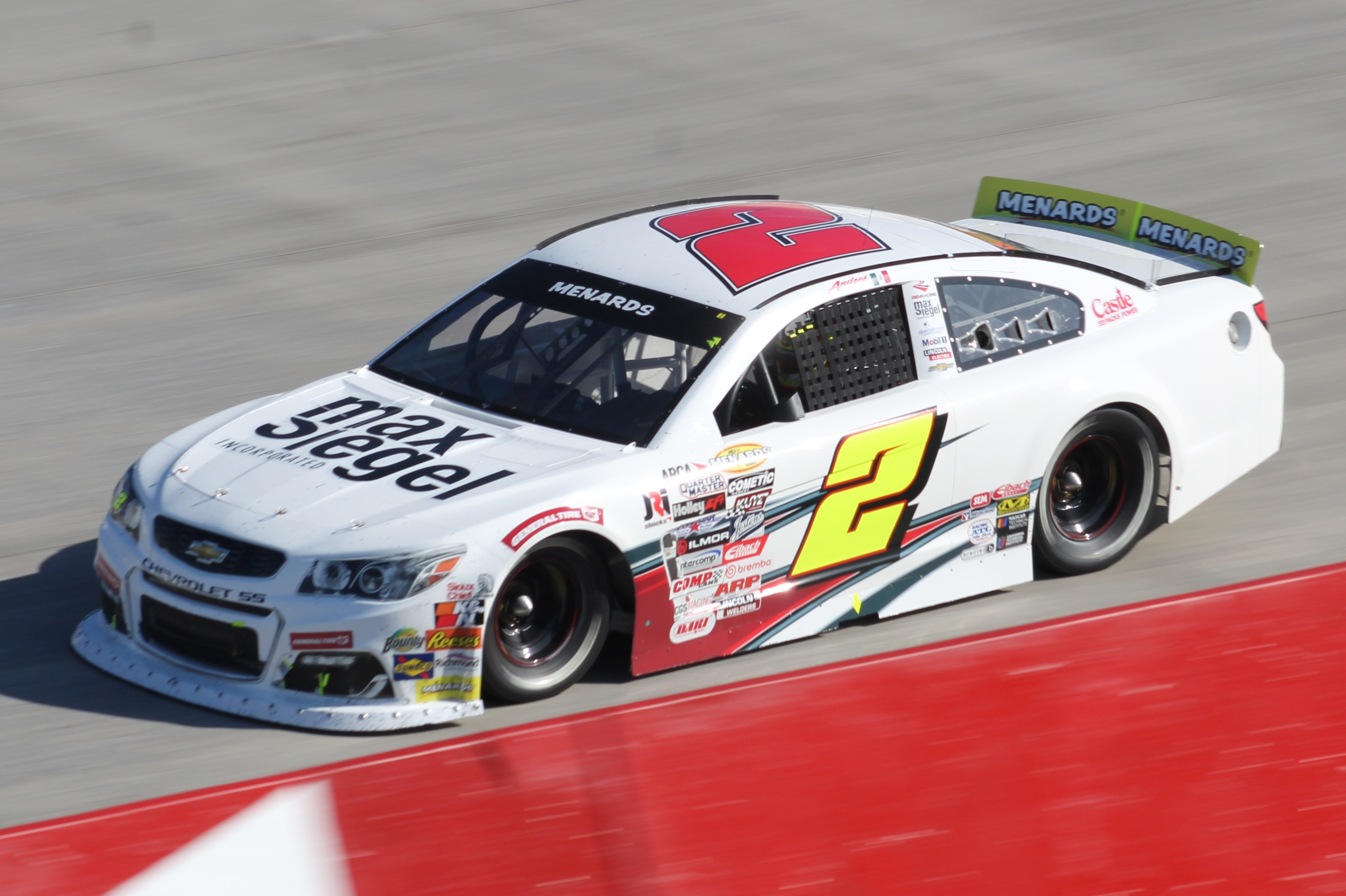
Perez at Dover in 2024.

On January 13, 2023, it was announced that Pérez de Lara would run full-time in the ARCA Menards Series for Rev Racing in the No. 2 Chevrolet, replacing Nick Sanchez, who had won the championship the previous year. He was entered in the season-opening race at Daytona International Speedway in the No. 01 Chevrolet for Fast Track Racing, but was withdrawn after practice due to age restrictions, although he was placed in the final results as a "did not start" in 40th place. Despite not winning a race, Pérez de Lara finished second in the final points standings with ten top-fives and fifteen top-tens with the best finish of second at the Illinois State Fairgrounds dirt track and Salem Speedway.

In 2024, Pérez de Lara continued to pilot the No. 2 Chevrolet for Rev Racing full-time in the ARCA Menards Series. After crashing out in the season-opener at Daytona, Pérez de Lara ran consistently well through the remainder of the season, accumulating ten top-fives and seventeen top-tens, though he was unable to score a win. At the conclusion of the season finale at Toledo, Pérez de Lara became the first foreign-born ARCA Menards Series champion.

=== NASCAR ===
==== Craftsman Truck Series ====
On May 21, 2024, it was announced that Pérez de Lara would make his NASCAR Craftsman Truck Series debut, driving the No. 7 for Spire Motorsports at Gateway. He finished ninth, his first career top-ten finish in the Truck Series.

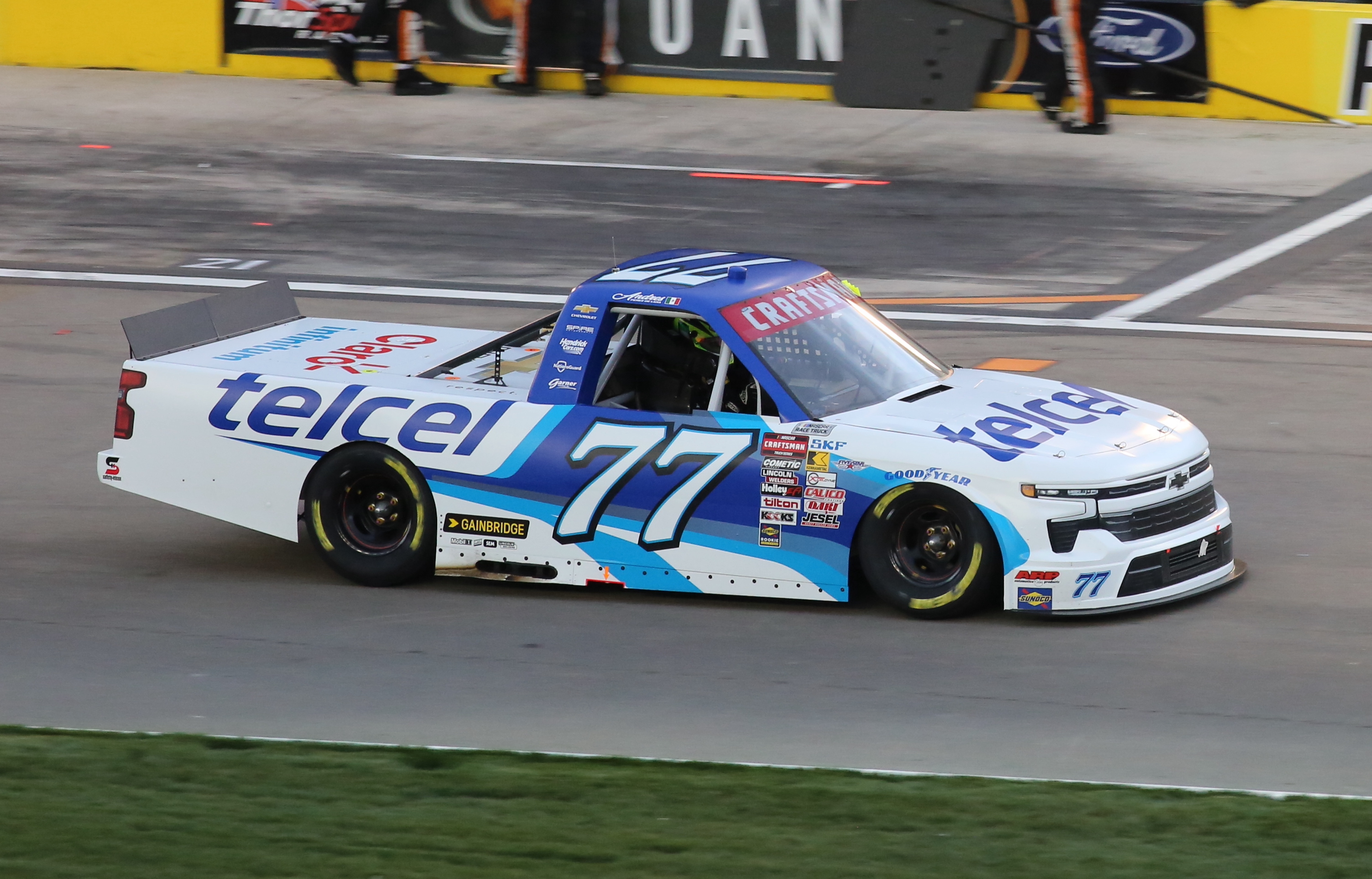
Pérez de Lara's No. 77 truck at Las Vegas Motor Speedway in 2025

On January 23, 2025, it was announced that Pérez de Lara would move to the Truck Series full-time, driving the No. 77 for Spire. Pérez de Lara departed Spire after Watkins Glen, instead finishing the year at Niece Motorsports, driving the No. 44.

==== Xfinity Series ====
On May 29, 2025, it was announced that Pérez de Lara would make his NASCAR Xfinity Series debut at Autódromo Hermanos Rodríguez, driving the No. 91 Chevrolet for DGM Racing.

== Personal life ==
Pérez de Lara is the brother of Pablo Pérez de Lara, who is also a racing driver with whom he competed in Formula 4. His father, Ricardo, is a former champion of the Super Copa Seat León in 2011–2013, the Ferrari Challenge North America in 2014, and the Tractocamiones Freightliner in 2015.

== Racing record ==
=== Career summary ===
Season	Series	Team	Races	Wins	Poles	F/Laps	Podiums	Points	Position
2019–20	NACAM Formula 4 Championship	Telcel RPL Racing	20	4	1	1	8	252	**3rd**
2020	NASCAR Mikel's Truck Series		?	?	?	?	?	?	**1st**
2021	NASCAR PEAK Mexico Series	HO Speed Racing	1	0	0	0	0	0	NC
2021	NASCAR Challenge Series - Mexico	HO Speed Racing	12	0	1	0	3	234	4th
2021	NACAM Formula 4 - México City Grand Prix	RPL Racing	1	0	0	0	0	N/A	DNF
2022	ARCA Menards Series	David Gilliland Racing	1	0	0	0	0	37	78th
2022	ARCA Menards Series East	David Gilliland Racing	1	0	0	0	0	37	42nd
2022	ARCA Menards Series West	David Gilliland Racing	2	0	0	0	2	134	25th
2022	NASCAR Challenge - Mexico		12	3	1	1	4	413	**1st**
2023	ARCA Menards Series	Fast Track Racing	1	0	0	0	0	912	**2nd**
2023	ARCA Menards Series	Rev Racing	19	0	1	0	4	912	**2nd**
2023	ARCA Menards Series East	Rev Racing	4	0	0	0	1	152	13th
2023	ARCA Menards Series West	Rev Racing	1	0	0	0	0	40	40th
2024	NASCAR Craftsman Truck Series	Spire Motorsports	1	0	0	0	0	34	45th
2024	NASCAR Craftsman Truck Series	Roper Racing	1	0	0	0	0	34	45th
2024	ARCA Menards Series	Rev Racing	20	0	0	0	5	956	**1st**
2024	ARCA Menards Series East	Rev Racing	5	0	0	0	1	197	10th
2024	ARCA Menards Series West	Rev Racing	1	0	0	0	0	36	46th
2025	NASCAR Xfinity Series	DGM Racing with Jesse Iwuji Motorsports	1	0	0	0	0	0	NC†
2025	NASCAR Craftsman Truck Series	Spire Motorsports	17	0	0	1	0	472	16th
2025	NASCAR Craftsman Truck Series	Niece Motorsports	8	0	0	0	0	472	16th
2026	Trans-Am Series - TA2	Team SLR	1	0	1	1	1		
2026	CARS Late Model Stock Car Tour	Tom Usry Racing	1	0	0	0	0	24	69th
2026	NASCAR Craftsman Truck Series	Niece Motorsports	25	0	0	4	0	487	16th

^{†} As Pérez de Lara was a guest driver, he was ineligible for championship points.

=== Complete NACAM Formula 4 Championship results ===
(key) (Races in bold indicate pole position) (Races in italics indicate fastest lap)

Year	Team	1	2	3	4	5	6	7	8	9	10	11	12	13	14	15	16	17	18	19	20	DC	Points
2019–20	Telcel RPL Racing	AHR; 1; 4	AHR; 2; 4	**AGS**; **1**; 1	AGS; 2; 1	AGS; 3; 6	PUE; 1; 9	PUE; 2; 5	PUE; 3; 5	MER; 1; 5	MER; 2; 1	MER; 3; 3	QUE1; 1; 1	QUE1; 2 Ret	QUE1; 3; 9	QUE2; 1; 3	QUE2; 2; 3	QUE2; 3; 5	MTY; 1; 3	MTY; 2; 7	MTY; 3; 5	3rd	252

=== NASCAR ===
(key) (Bold – Pole position awarded by qualifying time. Italics – Pole position earned by points standings or practice time. * – Most laps led.)

==== Xfinity Series ====
NASCAR Xfinity Series results
Year	Team	No.	Make	1	2	3	4	5	6	7	8	9	10	11	12	13	14	15	16	17	18	19	20	21	22	23	24	25	26	27	28	29	30	31	32	33	NXSC	Pts	Ref
2025	DGM Racing with Jesse Iwuji Motorsports	91	Chevy	DAY	ATL	COA	PHO	LVS	HOM	MAR	DAR	BRI	CAR	TAL	TEX	CLT	NSH	MXC; 30	POC	ATL	CSC	SON	DOV	IND	IOW	GLN	DAY	PIR	GTW	BRI	KAN	ROV	LVS	TAL	MAR	PHO	101st	0^{1}	

==== Craftsman Truck Series ====
NASCAR Craftsman Truck Series results
Year	Team	No.	Make	1	2	3	4	5	6	7	8	9	10	11	12	13	14	15	16	17	18	19	20	21	22	23	24	25	NCTC	Pts	Ref
2024	Spire Motorsports	7	Chevy	DAY	ATL	LVS	BRI	COA	MAR	TEX	KAN	DAR	NWS	CLT	GTW; 9	NSH	POC	IRP	RCH	MLW	BRI	KAN	TAL	HOM	MAR				45th	34	
2024	Roper Racing	04	Chevy																							PHO; 31			45th	34	
2025	Spire Motorsports	77	Chevy	DAY; 14	ATL; 27	LVS; 17	HOM; 25	MAR; 7	BRI; 19	CAR; 12	TEX; 29	KAN; 19	NWS; 24	CLT; 16	NSH; 19	MCH; 9	POC; 16	LRP; 17	IRP; 22	GLN; 21									16th	472	
2025	Niece Motorsports	44	Chevy																		RCH; 21	DAR; 16	BRI; 8	NHA; 15	ROV; 32	TAL; 17	MAR; 28	PHO; 30	16th	472	
2026	Niece Motorsports	44	Chevy	DAY; 13	ATL; 15	STP; 7	DAR; 32	CAR; 32	BRI; 17	TEX; 30	GLN; 13	DOV; 28	CLT; 19	NSH; 14	MCH; 19	COR; 21	LRP; 7	NWS; 23	IRP; 11	RCH; 23	NHA; 27	BRI; 17	KAN; 24	CLT; 8	PHO; 12	TAL; 31	MAR; 6	HOM; 33	16th	487	

^{*} Season still in progress
^{1} Ineligible for series points

=== ARCA Menards Series ===
(key) (Bold – Pole position awarded by qualifying time. Italics – Pole position earned by points standings or practice time. * – Most laps led.)

ARCA Menards Series results
Year	Team	No.	Make	1	2	3	4	5	6	7	8	9	10	11	12	13	14	15	16	17	18	19	20	AMSC	Pts	Ref
2022	David Gilliland Racing	51	Ford	DAY	PHO	TAL	KAN	CLT	IOW	BLN	ELK	MOH	POC	IRP	MCH	GLN	ISF	MLW	DSF	KAN	BRI; 7	SLM	TOL	78th	37	
2023	Fast Track Racing	01	Chevy	DAY; 40																				2nd	912	
2023	Rev Racing	2	Chevy		PHO; 4	TAL; 4	KAN; 6	CLT; 7	BLN; 4	ELK; 5	MOH; 15	IOW; 6	POC; 3	**MCH**; 17*	IRP; 8	GLN; 12	ISF; 2	MLW; 7	DSF; 4	KAN; 17	BRI; 3	SLM; 2	TOL; 4	2nd	912	
2024	Rev Racing	2	Chevy	DAY; 12	PHO; 8	TAL; 8	DOV; 5	KAN; 7	**CLT**; 3	IOW; 6	MOH; 6	BLN; 5	IRP; 2	SLM; 2	ELK; 5	**MCH**; 2	ISF; 15	MLW; 6	DSF; 3	GLN; 4	BRI; 4	KAN; 21	TOL; 6	1st	956	

==== ARCA Menards Series East ====
ARCA Menards Series East results
Year	Team	No.	Make	1	2	3	4	5	6	7	8	AMSEC	Pts	Ref
2022	David Gilliland Racing	51	Ford	NSM	FIF	DOV	NSV	IOW	MLW	BRI; 7		42nd	37	
2023	Rev Racing	2	Chevy	FIF	DOV	NSV	FRS	IOW; 6	IRP; 8	MLW; 7	BRI; 3	12th	202	
2024	Rev Racing	2	Chevy	FIF	DOV; 5	NSV	FRS	IOW; 6	IRP; 2	MLW; 6	BRI; 4	9th	247	

==== ARCA Menards Series West ====
ARCA Menards Series West results
Year	Team	No.	Make	1	2	3	4	5	6	7	8	9	10	11	12	AMSWC	Pts	Ref
2022	David Gilliland Racing	51	Ford	PHO	IRW	KCR	PIR	SON	IRW	EVG	PIR	AAS	LVS; 2	PHO; 3		25th	134	
2023	Rev Racing	2	Chevy	PHO; 4	IRW	KCR	PIR	SON	IRW	SHA	EVG	AAS	LVS	MAD	PHO	40th	40	
2024	Rev Racing	2	Chevy	PHO; 8	KER	PIR	SON	IRW	IRW	SHA	TRI	MAD	AAS	KER	PHO	46th	36	

=== CARS Late Model Stock Car Tour ===
(key) (Bold – Pole position awarded by qualifying time. Italics – Pole position earned by points standings or practice time. * – Most laps led. ** – All laps led.)

CARS Late Model Stock Car Tour results
Year	Team	No.	Make	1	2	3	4	5	6	7	8	9	10	11	12	13	14	CLMSCTC	Pts	Ref
2026	Tom Usry Racing	27	Chevy	SNM	WCS	NSV	CRW	ACE	LGY	DOM	NWS; 18	HCY	AND	FLC	TCM	NPS	SBO	69th	24	

Sporting positions
Preceded by Jesse Love	ARCA Menards Series Champion; 2024	Succeeded by Brenden Queen
