= 2026 SpeedyCash.com 250 =

NASCAR Craftsman Truck Series race at Texas Motor Speedway

Race details
- Race 7 of 25 in the 2026 NASCAR Craftsman Truck Series
- Date: May 1, 2026
- Location: Texas Motor Speedway in Fort Worth, Texas
- Course: Permanent racing facility
- Course length: 1.5 miles (2.4 km)
- Distance: 172 laps, 258 mi (415.21 km)
- Scheduled distance: 167 laps, 250.5 mi (403.1 km)
- Average speed: 112.924 miles per hour (181.734 km/h)

Pole position
Driver	Ben Rhodes	ThorSport Racing
- Time: 29.174

Most laps led
Driver	Carson Hocevar	Spire Motorsports
- Laps: 76

Fastest lap
Driver	Jake Garcia	ThorSport Racing
- Time: 29.535

Winner
No. 77	Carson Hocevar	Spire Motorsports

Television in the United States
- Network: FS1
- Announcers: Jamie Little, Michael Waltrip, and Joey Logano

Radio in the United States
- Radio: NRN
- Booth announcers: Brad Gillie and Nick Yeoman
- Turn announcers: Rob Albright (1 & 2) and Pat Patterson (3 & 4)

The 2026 SpeedyCash.com 250 was a NASCAR Craftsman Truck Series race held on Friday, May 1, 2026, at Texas Motor Speedway in Fort Worth, Texas. Contested over 172 laps—extended from 167 laps due to an overtime finish on the 1.5 mile (2.4 km) intermediate quad-oval, it was the seventh race of the 2026 NASCAR Craftsman Truck Series season, and the 28th running of the event.

In a chaotic final stage that resulted in two red flags for incidents, Carson Hocevar, driving for Spire Motorsports, overcame late pit road troubles and held off the field on the final restart in a thrilling finish, earning his sixth career NASCAR Craftsman Truck Series win, and his first of the season. Hocevar also dominated the majority of the event, winning stage two and leading a race-high 76 laps. Hocevar's teammate Kyle Busch finished in second, and Kaden Honeycutt finished third. Brandon Jones and Ben Rhodes rounded out the top five, while Layne Riggs, Daniel Hemric, Christian Eckes, Ty Majeski, and Chandler Smith rounded out the top ten.

== Report ==
=== Background ===
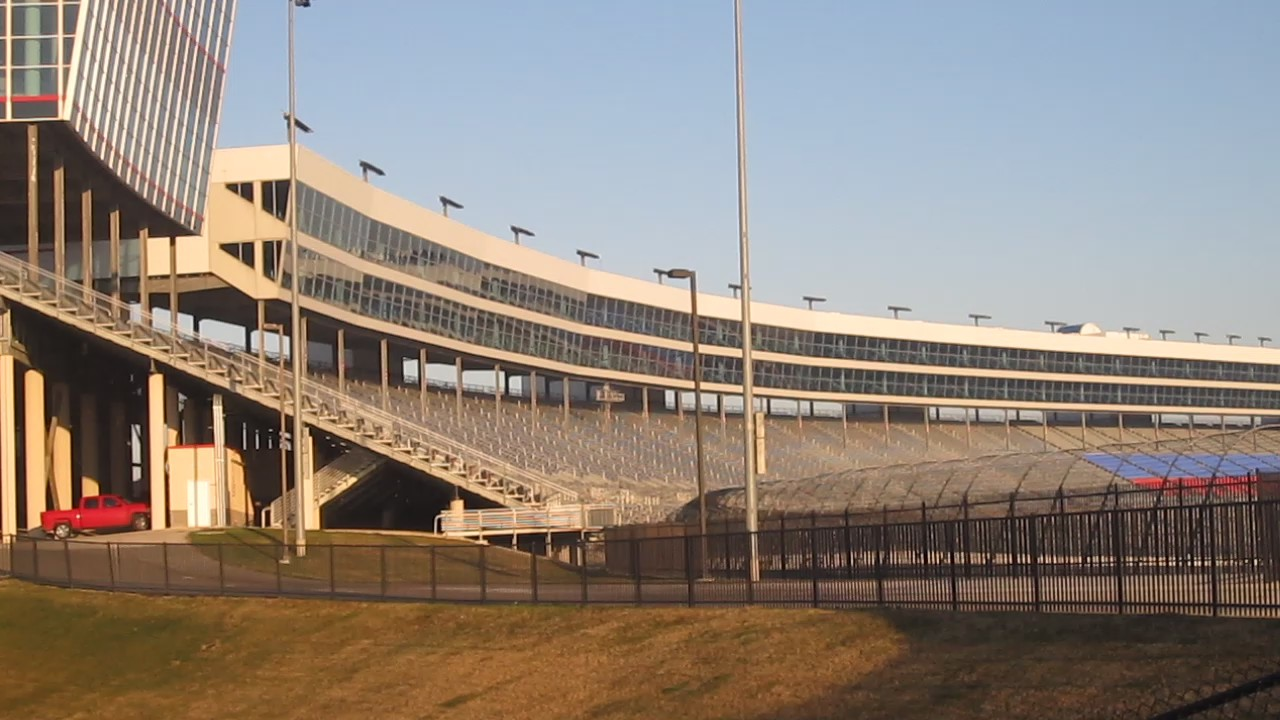
Texas Motor Speedway, the track where the race will be held.

Texas Motor Speedway is a speedway located in the northernmost portion of the U.S. city of Fort Worth, Texas – the portion located in Denton County, Texas. The track measures 1.5 miles (2.4 km) around and is banked 24 degrees in the turns, and is of the oval design, where the front straightaway juts outward slightly. The track layout is similar to Atlanta Motor Speedway and Charlotte Motor Speedway (formerly Lowe's Motor Speedway). The track is owned by Speedway Motorsports, Inc., the same company that owns Atlanta and Charlotte Motor Speedway, as well as the short-track Bristol Motor Speedway.

==== Entry list ====
- (R) denotes rookie driver.
- (i) denotes driver who is ineligible for series driver points.

#	Driver	Team	Make
1	Brandon Jones (i)	Tricon Garage	Toyota
2	Clayton Green	Team Reaume	Ford
5	William Sawalich (i)	Tricon Garage	Toyota
7	Kyle Busch (i)	Spire Motorsports	Chevrolet
9	Grant Enfinger	CR7 Motorsports	Chevrolet
10	Corey LaJoie	Kaulig Racing	Ram
11	Kaden Honeycutt	Tricon Garage	Toyota
12	Brenden Queen (R)	Kaulig Racing	Ram
13	Cole Butcher (R)	ThorSport Racing	Ford
14	Mini Tyrrell (R)	Kaulig Racing	Ram
15	Tanner Gray	Tricon Garage	Toyota
16	Justin Haley	Kaulig Racing	Ram
17	Gio Ruggiero	Tricon Garage	Toyota
18	Tyler Ankrum	McAnally–Hilgemann Racing	Chevrolet
19	Daniel Hemric	McAnally–Hilgemann Racing	Chevrolet
22	Josh Reaume	Team Reaume	Ford
25	Parker Kligerman	Kaulig Racing	Ram
26	Dawson Sutton	Rackley W.A.R.	Chevrolet
27	Toni Breidinger	Rackley W.A.R.	Chevrolet
33	Frankie Muniz	Team Reaume	Ford
34	Layne Riggs	Front Row Motorsports	Ford
38	Chandler Smith	Front Row Motorsports	Ford
42	Conner Jones	Niece Motorsports	Chevrolet
44	Andrés Pérez de Lara	Niece Motorsports	Chevrolet
45	Ross Chastain (i)	Niece Motorsports	Chevrolet
52	Stewart Friesen	Halmar Friesen Racing	Toyota
62	Cory Roper	Halmar Friesen Racing	Toyota
76	Spencer Boyd	Freedom Racing Enterprises	Chevrolet
77	Carson Hocevar (i)	Spire Motorsports	Chevrolet
81	Kris Wright	McAnally–Hilgemann Racing	Chevrolet
88	Ty Majeski	ThorSport Racing	Ford
91	Christian Eckes	McAnally–Hilgemann Racing	Chevrolet
93	Caleb Costner	Costner Motorsports	Chevrolet
98	Jake Garcia	ThorSport Racing	Ford
99	Ben Rhodes	ThorSport Racing	Ford
Official entry list

== Practice ==
The first and only practice session was held on Friday, May 1, at 1:30 PM CST, and lasted for 50 minutes.

Jake Garcia, driving for ThorSport Racing, set the fastest time in the session, with a lap of 29.269 seconds, and a speed of 184.496 miles per hour (296.918 km/h).

=== Practice results ===
Pos.	#	Driver	Team	Make	Time	Speed
1	98	Jake Garcia	ThorSport Racing	Ford	29.269	184.496
2	99	Ben Rhodes	ThorSport Racing	Ford	29.371	183.855
3	9	Grant Enfinger	CR7 Motorsports	Chevrolet	29.384	183.773
Full practice results

== Qualifying ==
Qualifying was held on Friday, May 1, at 2:35 PM CST. Since Texas Motor Speedway is an intermediate racetrack, the qualifying procedure used was a single-car, one-lap system with one round. Drivers were on track by themselves and had one lap to post a qualifying time, and whoever set the fastest time won the pole.

Ben Rhodes, driving for ThorSport Racing, qualified on pole position with a lap of 29.174 seconds, and a speed of 185.096 miles per hour (297.883 km/h).

No drivers failed to qualify.

=== Qualifying results ===
Pos.	#	Driver	Team	Make	Time	Speed
1	99	Ben Rhodes	ThorSport Racing	Ford	29.174	185.096
2	98	Jake Garcia	ThorSport Racing	Ford	29.201	184.925
3	17	Gio Ruggiero	Tricon Garage	Toyota	29.219	184.811
4	13	Cole Butcher (R)	ThorSport Racing	Ford	29.226	184.767
5	15	Tanner Gray	Tricon Garage	Toyota	29.298	184.313
6	7	Kyle Busch (i)	Spire Motorsports	Chevrolet	29.302	184.288
7	52	Stewart Friesen	Halmar Friesen Racing	Toyota	29.304	184.275
8	38	Chandler Smith	Front Row Motorsports	Ford	29.326	184.137
9	9	Grant Enfinger	CR7 Motorsports	Chevrolet	29.327	184.131
10	11	Kaden Honeycutt	Tricon Garage	Toyota	29.336	184.074
11	77	Carson Hocevar (i)	Spire Motorsports	Chevrolet	29.384	183.773
12	91	Christian Eckes	McAnally–Hilgemann Racing	Chevrolet	29.396	183.698
13	18	Tyler Ankrum	McAnally–Hilgemann Racing	Chevrolet	29.404	183.648
14	19	Daniel Hemric	McAnally–Hilgemann Racing	Chevrolet	29.406	183.636
15	44	Andrés Pérez de Lara	Niece Motorsports	Chevrolet	29.417	183.567
16	42	Conner Jones	Niece Motorsports	Chevrolet	29.451	183.355
17	12	Brenden Queen (R)	Kaulig Racing	Ram	29.456	183.324
18	1	Brandon Jones (i)	Tricon Garage	Toyota	29.459	183.306
19	25	Parker Kligerman	Kaulig Racing	Ram	29.472	183.225
20	88	Ty Majeski	ThorSport Racing	Ford	29.493	183.094
21	5	William Sawalich (i)	Tricon Garage	Toyota	29.504	183.026
22	26	Dawson Sutton	Rackley W.A.R.	Chevrolet	29.530	182.865
23	45	Ross Chastain (i)	Niece Motorsports	Chevrolet	29.532	182.852
24	16	Justin Haley	Kaulig Racing	Ram	29.583	182.537
25	10	Corey LaJoie	Kaulig Racing	Ram	29.677	181.959
26	81	Kris Wright	McAnally–Hilgemann Racing	Chevrolet	29.732	181.622
27	27	Toni Breidinger	Rackley W.A.R.	Chevrolet	29.815	181.117
28	14	Mini Tyrrell (R)	Kaulig Racing	Ram	29.961	180.234
29	2	Clayton Green	Team Reaume	Ford	30.244	178.548
30	76	Spencer Boyd	Freedom Racing Enterprises	Chevrolet	30.259	178.459
31	22	Josh Reaume	Team Reaume	Ford	30.687	175.970
Qualified by owner's points
32	33	Frankie Muniz	Team Reaume	Ford	31.565	171.076
33	93	Caleb Costner	Costner Motorsports	Chevrolet	32.111	168.167
34	34	Layne Riggs	Front Row Motorsports	Ford	—	—
35	62	Cory Roper	Halmar Friesen Racing	Toyota	—	—
Official qualifying results
Official starting lineup

== Race ==
=== Race results ===
==== Stage results ====
Stage One Laps: 40

Pos.	#	Driver	Team	Make	Pts
1	99	Ben Rhodes	ThorSport Racing	Ford	10
2	77	Carson Hocevar (i)	Spire Motorsports	Chevrolet	0
3	17	Gio Ruggiero	Tricon Garage	Toyota	8
4	11	Kaden Honeycutt	Tricon Garage	Toyota	7
5	38	Chandler Smith	Front Row Motorsports	Ford	6
6	52	Stewart Friesen	Halmar Friesen Racing	Toyota	5
7	9	Grant Enfinger	CR7 Motorsports	Chevrolet	4
8	34	Layne Riggs	Front Row Motorsports	Ford	3
9	88	Ty Majeski	ThorSport Racing	Ford	2
10	45	Ross Chastain (i)	Niece Motorsports	Chevrolet	0

Stage Two Laps: 40

Pos	#	Driver	Team	Make	Pts
1	77	Carson Hocevar (i)	Spire Motorsports	Chevrolet	0
2	11	Kaden Honeycutt	Tricon Garage	Toyota	9
3	17	Gio Ruggiero	Tricon Garage	Toyota	8
4	26	Dawson Sutton	Rackley W.A.R.	Chevrolet	7
5	18	Tyler Ankrum	McAnally–Hilgemann Racing	Chevrolet	6
6	14	Mini Tyrrell (R)	Kaulig Racing	Ram	5
7	9	Grant Enfinger	CR7 Motorsports	Chevrolet	4
8	15	Tanner Gray	Tricon Garage	Toyota	3
9	38	Chandler Smith	Front Row Motorsports	Ford	2
10	44	Andrés Pérez de Lara	Niece Motorsports	Chevrolet	1

=== Final Stage results ===
Stage Three Laps: 92

Fin	St	#	Driver	Team	Make	Laps	Led	Status	Pts
1	11	77	Carson Hocevar (i)	Spire Motorsports	Chevrolet	172	76	Running	0
2	6	7	Kyle Busch (i)	Spire Motorsports	Chevrolet	172	0	Running	0
3	10	11	Kaden Honeycutt	Tricon Garage	Toyota	172	3	Running	50
4	18	1	Brandon Jones (i)	Tricon Garage	Toyota	172	16	Running	0
5	1	99	Ben Rhodes	ThorSport Racing	Ford	172	41	Running	42
6	34	34	Layne Riggs	Front Row Motorsports	Ford	172	6	Running	34
7	14	19	Daniel Hemric	McAnally–Hilgemann Racing	Chevrolet	172	0	Running	30
8	12	91	Christian Eckes	McAnally–Hilgemann Racing	Chevrolet	172	0	Running	29
9	20	88	Ty Majeski	ThorSport Racing	Ford	172	0	Running	30
10	8	38	Chandler Smith	Front Row Motorsports	Ford	172	0	Running	35
11	19	25	Parker Kligerman	Kaulig Racing	Ram	172	0	Running	26
12	23	45	Ross Chastain (i)	Niece Motorsports	Chevrolet	172	0	Running	0
13	17	12	Brenden Queen (R)	Kaulig Racing	Ram	172	0	Running	24
14	3	17	Gio Ruggiero	Tricon Garage	Toyota	172	22	Running	39
15	13	18	Tyler Ankrum	McAnally–Hilgemann Racing	Chevrolet	172	0	Running	28
16	22	26	Dawson Sutton	Rackley W.A.R.	Chevrolet	172	5	Running	28
17	21	5	William Sawalich (i)	Tricon Garage	Toyota	171	0	Running	0
18	27	27	Toni Breidinger	Rackley W.A.R.	Chevrolet	171	0	Running	19
19	7	52	Stewart Friesen	Halmar Friesen Racing	Toyota	171	0	Running	23
20	30	76	Spencer Boyd	Freedom Racing Enterprises	Chevrolet	170	0	Running	17
21	28	14	Mini Tyrrell (R)	Kaulig Racing	Ram	170	1	Running	21
22	31	22	Josh Reaume	Team Reaume	Ford	169	0	Running	15
23	32	33	Frankie Muniz	Team Reaume	Ford	168	0	Running	14
24	33	93	Caleb Costner	Costner Motorsports	Chevrolet	168	0	Running	13
25	25	10	Corey LaJoie	Kaulig Racing	Ram	165	0	Running	12
26	29	2	Clayton Green	Team Reaume	Ford	165	0	Running	11
27	24	16	Justin Haley	Kaulig Racing	Ram	164	0	Accident	10
28	5	15	Tanner Gray	Tricon Garage	Toyota	164	2	Accident	12
29	2	98	Jake Garcia	ThorSport Racing	Ford	163	0	Accident	9
30	15	44	Andrés Pérez de Lara	Niece Motorsports	Chevrolet	163	0	Accident	8
31	26	81	Kris Wright	McAnally–Hilgemann Racing	Chevrolet	163	0	Running	6
32	9	9	Grant Enfinger	CR7 Motorsports	Chevrolet	156	0	Accident	13
33	16	42	Conner Jones	Niece Motorsports	Chevrolet	155	0	Accident	4
34	35	62	Cory Roper	Halmar Friesen Racing	Toyota	123	0	Suspension	3
35	4	13	Cole Butcher (R)	ThorSport Racing	Ford	51	0	Accident	2
Official race results

=== Race statistics ===
- Lead changes: 14 among 9 different drivers
- Cautions/Laps: 8 for 39 laps
- Red flags: 2
- Time of race: 2 hours, 17 minutes and 5 seconds
- Average speed: 112.924 miles per hour (181.734 km/h)

== Standings after the race ==
Drivers' Championship standings

	Pos	Driver	Points
1	1	Kaden Honeycutt	257
1	2	Chandler Smith	243 (–14)
1	3	Layne Riggs	238 (–19)
2	4	Gio Ruggiero	226 (–31)
3	5	Ben Rhodes	223 (–34)
1	6	Christian Eckes	220 (–37)
	7	Ty Majeski	212 (–45)
5	8	Corey Heim	204 (–53)
3	9	Tyler Ankrum	165 (–92)
1	10	Stewart Friesen	163 (–94)
Official driver's standings

Manufacturers' Championship standings

	Pos	Manufacturer	Points
	1	Toyota	300
1	2	Chevrolet	275 (–25)
1	3	Ford	269 (–31)
	4	Ram	194 (–106)

- Note: Only the first 10 positions are included for the driver standings.

Previous race: 2026 Tennessee Army National Guard 250	NASCAR Craftsman Truck Series; 2026 season	Next race: 2026 Bully Hill Vineyards 176 at The Glen
