= 2026 Buckle Up South Carolina 200 =

NASCAR Craftsman Truck Series race at Darlington Raceway

Race details
- Race 4 of 25 in the 2026 NASCAR Craftsman Truck Series
- Date: March 20, 2026
- Location: Darlington Raceway in Darlington, South Carolina
- Course: Permanent racing facility
- Course length: 1.366 miles (2.198 km)
- Distance: 157 laps, 214.462 mi (345.142 km)
- Scheduled distance: 147 laps, 200.802 mi (323.159 km)
- Average speed: 97.005 miles per hour (156.114 km/h)

Pole position
| Driver | Kaden Honeycutt | Tricon Garage |
- Time: 28.848

Most laps led
| Driver | Kaden Honeycutt | Tricon Garage |
- Laps: 59

Fastest lap
| Driver | Carson Hocevar | Spire Motorsports |
- Time: 29.599

Winner
| No. 5 | Corey Heim | Tricon Garage |

Television in the United States
- Network: FS1
- Announcers: Kevin Harvick, Ryan Blaney, and Joey Logano

Radio in the United States
- Radio: NRN
- Booth announcers: Alex Hayden, Mike Bagley, and Todd Gordon
- Turn announcers: Dave Moody (1 & 2) and Tim Catafalmo (3 & 4)

The 2026 Buckle Up South Carolina 200 was a NASCAR Craftsman Truck Series race held on March 20, 2026, at Darlington Raceway in Darlington, South Carolina. Contested over 157 laps—extended from 147 laps due to a double overtime finish on the 1.366-mile (2.198 km) egg-shaped oval, it was the fourth race of the 2026 NASCAR Craftsman Truck Series season, and the seventh running of the event.

After chaos in the late stages, Corey Heim, driving for Tricon Garage, took advantage of fresher tires, restarting from ninth position on the final restart and made a last lap, final corner pass on Ross Chastain to earn his 24th career NASCAR Craftsman Truck Series win, and his first of the season. Chastain finished second, and Christian Eckes finished third. Pole-sitter Kaden Honeycutt and Connor Mosack rounded out the top five, while Christopher Bell, Grant Enfinger, Gio Ruggiero, Daniel Hemric, and William Sawalich rounded out the top ten.

This was the first of three races for the Triple Truck Challenge. Heim won the race and was granted the $50K bonus cash.

== Report ==
=== Background ===
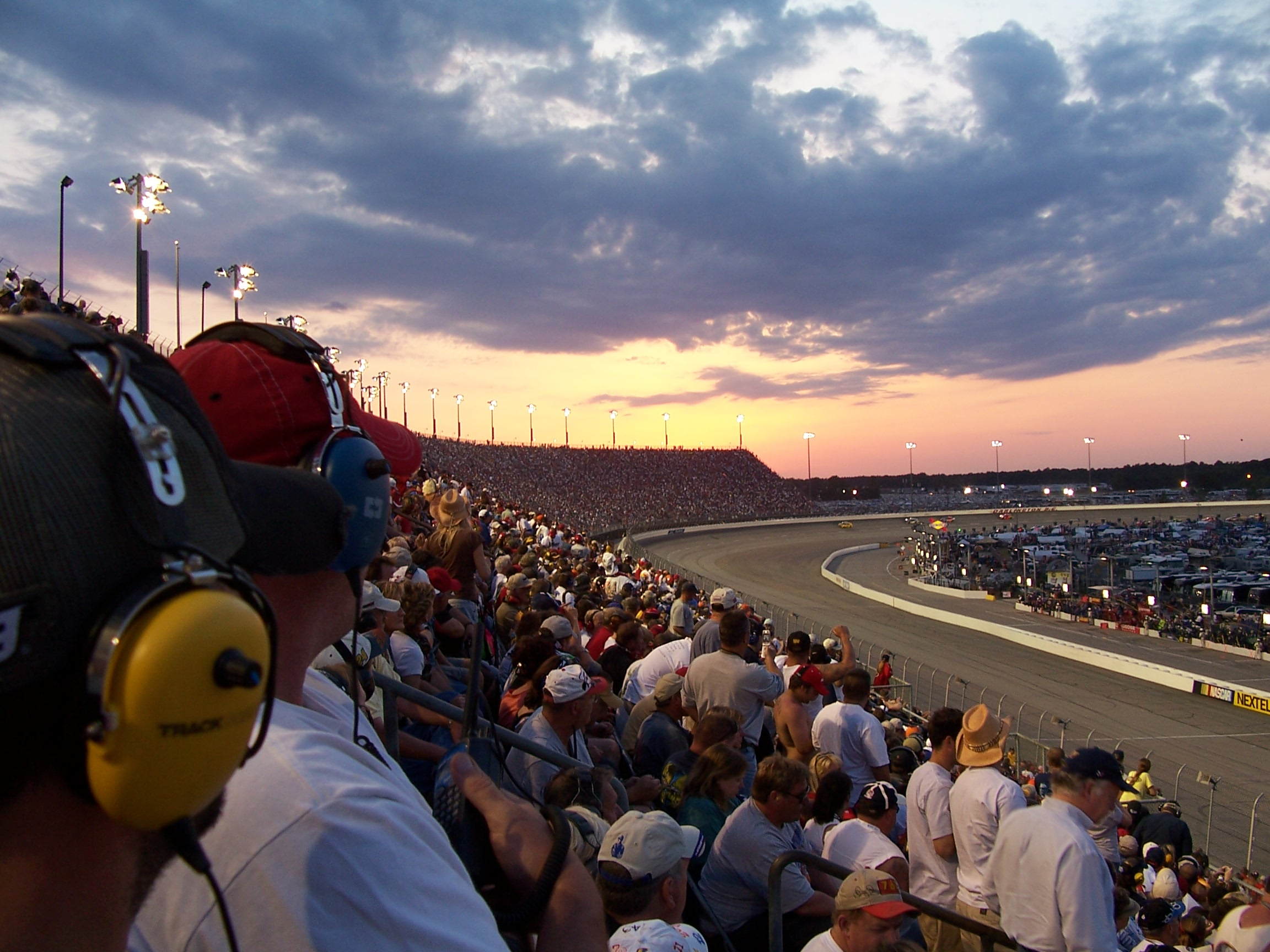
Darlington Raceway, the track where the race was held.

Darlington Raceway is a race track built for NASCAR racing located near Darlington, South Carolina. It is nicknamed "The Lady in Black" and "The Track Too Tough to Tame" by many NASCAR fans and drivers and advertised as "A NASCAR Tradition." It is of a unique, somewhat egg-shaped design, an oval with the ends of very different configurations, a condition which supposedly arose from the proximity of one end of the track to a minnow pond the owner refused to relocate. This situation makes it very challenging for the crews to set up their cars' handling in a way that is effective at both ends.

Since 2015, this weekend has served as a retro-themed weekend. From 2015 to 2023, the race has hosted NASCAR's Throwback weekend, which featured cars sporting paint schemes that pay homage to past teams and drivers. In 2024, the theme was changed to Alumni Weekend, where former drivers, crew chiefs, mechanics, and other significant figures are invited as guests. Some teams still use retro schemes, while the main focus has shifted to legends themselves.

==== Entry list ====
- (R) denotes rookie driver.
- (i) denotes driver who is ineligible for series driver points.

| # | Driver | Team | Make |
|---|---|---|---|
| 1 | William Sawalich (i) | Tricon Garage | Toyota |
| 2 | Clayton Green | Team Reaume | Ford |
| 5 | Corey Heim | Tricon Garage | Toyota |
| 7 | Connor Mosack | Spire Motorsports | Chevrolet |
| 9 | Grant Enfinger | CR7 Motorsports | Chevrolet |
| 10 | A. J. Allmendinger (i) | Kaulig Racing | Ram |
| 11 | Kaden Honeycutt | Tricon Garage | Toyota |
| 12 | Brenden Queen (R) | Kaulig Racing | Ram |
| 13 | Cole Butcher (R) | ThorSport Racing | Ford |
| 14 | Mini Tyrrell (R) | Kaulig Racing | Ram |
| 15 | Tanner Gray | Tricon Garage | Toyota |
| 16 | Justin Haley | Kaulig Racing | Ram |
| 17 | Gio Ruggiero | Tricon Garage | Toyota |
| 18 | Tyler Ankrum | McAnally–Hilgemann Racing | Chevrolet |
| 19 | Daniel Hemric | McAnally–Hilgemann Racing | Chevrolet |
| 22 | Josh Reaume | Team Reaume | Ford |
| 25 | Corey LaJoie (i) | Kaulig Racing | Ram |
| 26 | Dawson Sutton | Rackley W.A.R. | Chevrolet |
| 33 | Frankie Muniz | Team Reaume | Ford |
| 34 | Layne Riggs | Front Row Motorsports | Ford |
| 38 | Chandler Smith | Front Row Motorsports | Ford |
| 42 | Conner Jones | Niece Motorsports | Chevrolet |
| 44 | Andrés Pérez de Lara | Niece Motorsports | Chevrolet |
| 45 | Ross Chastain (i) | Niece Motorsports | Chevrolet |
| 52 | Stewart Friesen | Halmar Friesen Racing | Toyota |
| 56 | Timmy Hill | Hill Motorsports | Toyota |
| 62 | Christopher Bell (i) | Halmar Friesen Racing | Toyota |
| 76 | Spencer Boyd | Freedom Racing Enterprises | Chevrolet |
| 77 | Carson Hocevar (i) | Spire Motorsports | Chevrolet |
| 81 | Kris Wright | McAnally–Hilgemann Racing | Chevrolet |
| 88 | Ty Majeski | ThorSport Racing | Ford |
| 90 | Justin Carroll | TC Motorsports | Toyota |
| 91 | Christian Eckes | McAnally–Hilgemann Racing | Chevrolet |
| 93 | Caleb Costner | Costner Motorsports | Chevrolet |
| 98 | Jake Garcia | ThorSport Racing | Ford |
| 99 | Ben Rhodes | ThorSport Racing | Ford |
Official entry list

== Practice ==
The first and only practice session was held on Friday, March 20, at 3:30 PM EST, and would last for 50 minutes.

Kaden Honeycutt, driving for Tricon Garage, set the fastest time in the session, with a lap of 29.459 seconds, and a speed of 166.930 miles per hour (268.648 km/h).

=== Practice results ===
| Pos. | # | Driver | Team | Make | Time | Speed |
|---|---|---|---|---|---|---|
| 1 | 11 | Kaden Honeycutt | Tricon Garage | Toyota | 29.459 | 166.930 |
| 2 | 88 | Ty Majeski | ThorSport Racing | Ford | 29.712 | 165.509 |
| 3 | 5 | Corey Heim | Tricon Garage | Toyota | 29.764 | 165.220 |
Full practice results

== Qualifying ==
Qualifying was held on Friday, March 20, at 4:35 PM EST. Since Darlington Raceway is an intermediate racetrack, the qualifying procedure used was a single-car, one-lap system with one round. Drivers were on track by themselves and had one lap to post a qualifying time, and whoever set the fastest time won the pole.

Kaden Honeycutt, driving for Tricon Garage, qualified on pole position with a lap of 28.848 seconds, and a speed of 170.466 mph (274.338 km/h).

No drivers failed to qualify.

=== Qualifying results ===
| Pos. | # | Driver | Team | Make | Time | Speed |
|---|---|---|---|---|---|---|
| 1 | 11 | Kaden Honeycutt | Tricon Garage | Toyota | 28.848 | 170.466 |
| 2 | 77 | Carson Hocevar (i) | Spire Motorsports | Chevrolet | 28.868 | 170.348 |
| 3 | 15 | Tanner Gray | Tricon Garage | Toyota | 28.943 | 169.906 |
| 4 | 17 | Gio Ruggiero | Tricon Garage | Toyota | 28.958 | 169.818 |
| 5 | 5 | Corey Heim | Tricon Garage | Toyota | 28.971 | 169.742 |
| 6 | 62 | Christopher Bell (i) | Halmar Friesen Racing | Toyota | 28.978 | 169.701 |
| 7 | 88 | Ty Majeski | ThorSport Racing | Ford | 28.992 | 169.619 |
| 8 | 34 | Layne Riggs | Front Row Motorsports | Ford | 29.037 | 169.356 |
| 9 | 45 | Ross Chastain (i) | Niece Motorsports | Chevrolet | 29.153 | 168.682 |
| 10 | 7 | Connor Mosack | Spire Motorsports | Chevrolet | 29.172 | 168.573 |
| 11 | 9 | Grant Enfinger | CR7 Motorsports | Chevrolet | 29.199 | 168.417 |
| 12 | 38 | Chandler Smith | Front Row Motorsports | Ford | 29.234 | 168.215 |
| 13 | 52 | Stewart Friesen | Halmar Friesen Racing | Toyota | 29.263 | 168.048 |
| 14 | 19 | Daniel Hemric | McAnally–Hilgemann Racing | Chevrolet | 29.282 | 167.939 |
| 15 | 99 | Ben Rhodes | ThorSport Racing | Ford | 29.300 | 167.836 |
| 16 | 91 | Christian Eckes | McAnally–Hilgemann Racing | Chevrolet | 29.388 | 167.334 |
| 17 | 13 | Cole Butcher (R) | ThorSport Racing | Ford | 29.435 | 167.066 |
| 18 | 18 | Tyler Ankrum | McAnally–Hilgemann Racing | Chevrolet | 29.456 | 166.947 |
| 19 | 42 | Conner Jones | Niece Motorsports | Chevrolet | 29.485 | 166.783 |
| 20 | 25 | Corey LaJoie (i) | Kaulig Racing | Ram | 29.489 | 166.760 |
| 21 | 44 | Andrés Pérez de Lara | Niece Motorsports | Chevrolet | 29.501 | 166.693 |
| 22 | 10 | A. J. Allmendinger (i) | Kaulig Racing | Ram | 29.517 | 166.602 |
| 23 | 98 | Jake Garcia | ThorSport Racing | Ford | 29.520 | 166.585 |
| 24 | 26 | Dawson Sutton | Rackley W.A.R. | Chevrolet | 29.522 | 166.574 |
| 25 | 16 | Justin Haley | Kaulig Racing | Ram | 29.553 | 166.399 |
| 26 | 56 | Timmy Hill | Hill Motorsports | Toyota | 29.694 | 165.609 |
| 27 | 1 | William Sawalich (i) | Tricon Garage | Toyota | 29.702 | 165.565 |
| 28 | 81 | Kris Wright | McAnally–Hilgemann Racing | Chevrolet | 29.740 | 165.353 |
| 29 | 12 | Brenden Queen (R) | Kaulig Racing | Ram | 29.905 | 164.441 |
| 30 | 14 | Mini Tyrrell (R) | Kaulig Racing | Ram | 30.464 | 161.423 |
| 31 | 22 | Josh Reaume | Team Reaume | Ford | 30.955 | 158.863 |
Qualified by owner's points
| 32 | 76 | Spencer Boyd | Freedom Racing Enterprises | Chevrolet | 31.125 | 157.995 |
| 33 | 2 | Clayton Green | Team Reaume | Ford | 31.193 | 157.651 |
| 34 | 90 | Justin Carroll | TC Motorsports | Toyota | 31.319 | 157.017 |
| 35 | 93 | Caleb Costner | Costner Motorsports | Chevrolet | 31.713 | 155.066 |
| 36 | 33 | Frankie Muniz | Team Reaume | Ford | — | — |
Official qualifying results
Official starting lineup

== Race ==
=== Race results ===
==== Stage results ====
Stage One Laps: 45

| Pos. | # | Driver | Team | Make | Pts |
|---|---|---|---|---|---|
| 1 | 91 | Christian Eckes | McAnally–Hilgemann Racing | Chevrolet | 10 |
| 2 | 11 | Kaden Honeycutt | Tricon Garage | Toyota | 9 |
| 3 | 5 | Corey Heim | Tricon Garage | Toyota | 8 |
| 4 | 34 | Layne Riggs | Front Row Motorsports | Ford | 7 |
| 5 | 1 | William Sawalich (i) | Tricon Garage | Toyota | 0 |
| 6 | 88 | Ty Majeski | ThorSport Racing | Ford | 5 |
| 7 | 77 | Carson Hocevar (i) | Spire Motorsports | Chevrolet | 0 |
| 8 | 45 | Ross Chastain (i) | Niece Motorsports | Chevrolet | 0 |
| 9 | 15 | Tanner Gray | Tricon Garage | Toyota | 2 |
| 10 | 19 | Daniel Hemric | McAnally–Hilgemann Racing | Chevrolet | 1 |

Stage Two Laps: 45

| Pos. | # | Driver | Team | Make | Pts |
|---|---|---|---|---|---|
| 1 | 11 | Kaden Honeycutt | Tricon Garage | Toyota | 10 |
| 2 | 45 | Ross Chastain (i) | Niece Motorsports | Chevrolet | 0 |
| 3 | 88 | Ty Majeski | ThorSport Racing | Ford | 8 |
| 4 | 5 | Corey Heim | Tricon Garage | Toyota | 7 |
| 5 | 91 | Christian Eckes | McAnally–Hilgemann Racing | Chevrolet | 6 |
| 6 | 18 | Tyler Ankrum | McAnally–Hilgemann Racing | Chevrolet | 5 |
| 7 | 77 | Carson Hocevar (i) | Spire Motorsports | Chevrolet | 0 |
| 8 | 34 | Layne Riggs | Front Row Motorsports | Ford | 3 |
| 9 | 98 | Jake Garcia | ThorSport Racing | Ford | 2 |
| 10 | 1 | William Sawalich (i) | Tricon Garage | Toyota | 0 |

=== Final Stage results ===
Stage Three Laps: 67

| Fin | St | # | Driver | Team | Make | Laps | Led | Status | Pts |
|---|---|---|---|---|---|---|---|---|---|
| 1 | 5 | 5 | Corey Heim | Tricon Garage | Toyota | 157 | 28 | Running | 70 |
| 2 | 9 | 45 | Ross Chastain (i) | Niece Motorsports | Chevrolet | 157 | 35 | Running | 0 |
| 3 | 16 | 91 | Christian Eckes | McAnally–Hilgemann Racing | Chevrolet | 157 | 7 | Running | 50 |
| 4 | 1 | 11 | Kaden Honeycutt | Tricon Garage | Toyota | 157 | 59 | Running | 52 |
| 5 | 10 | 7 | Connor Mosack | Spire Motorsports | Chevrolet | 157 | 0 | Running | 32 |
| 6 | 6 | 62 | Christopher Bell (i) | Halmar Friesen Racing | Toyota | 157 | 6 | Running | 0 |
| 7 | 11 | 9 | Grant Enfinger | CR7 Motorsports | Chevrolet | 157 | 0 | Running | 30 |
| 8 | 4 | 17 | Gio Ruggiero | Tricon Garage | Toyota | 157 | 0 | Running | 29 |
| 9 | 14 | 19 | Daniel Hemric | McAnally–Hilgemann Racing | Chevrolet | 157 | 0 | Running | 29 |
| 10 | 27 | 1 | William Sawalich (i) | Tricon Garage | Toyota | 157 | 0 | Running | 0 |
| 11 | 22 | 10 | A. J. Allmendinger (i) | Kaulig Racing | Ram | 157 | 0 | Running | 0 |
| 12 | 8 | 34 | Layne Riggs | Front Row Motorsports | Ford | 157 | 0 | Running | 35 |
| 13 | 3 | 15 | Tanner Gray | Tricon Garage | Toyota | 157 | 0 | Running | 26 |
| 14 | 26 | 56 | Timmy Hill | Hill Motorsports | Toyota | 157 | 3 | Running | 23 |
| 15 | 25 | 16 | Justin Haley | Kaulig Racing | Ram | 157 | 0 | Running | 22 |
| 16 | 19 | 42 | Conner Jones | Niece Motorsports | Chevrolet | 157 | 3 | Running | 21 |
| 17 | 12 | 38 | Chandler Smith | Front Row Motorsports | Ford | 157 | 0 | Running | 20 |
| 18 | 36 | 33 | Frankie Muniz | Team Reaume | Ford | 157 | 0 | Running | 19 |
| 19 | 24 | 26 | Dawson Sutton | Rackley W.A.R. | Chevrolet | 157 | 0 | Running | 18 |
| 20 | 29 | 12 | Brenden Queen (R) | Kaulig Racing | Ram | 157 | 0 | Running | 17 |
| 21 | 20 | 25 | Corey LaJoie (i) | Kaulig Racing | Ram | 157 | 0 | Running | 0 |
| 22 | 2 | 77 | Carson Hocevar (i) | Spire Motorsports | Chevrolet | 157 | 16 | Running | 0 |
| 23 | 23 | 98 | Jake Garcia | ThorSport Racing | Ford | 157 | 0 | Running | 16 |
| 24 | 18 | 18 | Tyler Ankrum | McAnally–Hilgemann Racing | Chevrolet | 157 | 0 | Running | 18 |
| 25 | 13 | 52 | Stewart Friesen | Halmar Friesen Racing | Toyota | 157 | 0 | Running | 12 |
| 26 | 34 | 90 | Justin Carroll | TC Motorsports | Toyota | 157 | 0 | Running | 11 |
| 27 | 35 | 93 | Caleb Costner | Costner Motorsports | Chevrolet | 155 | 0 | Running | 10 |
| 28 | 17 | 13 | Cole Butcher (R) | ThorSport Racing | Ford | 153 | 0 | Running | 9 |
| 29 | 33 | 2 | Clayton Green | Team Reaume | Ford | 148 | 0 | Running | 8 |
| 30 | 32 | 76 | Spencer Boyd | Freedom Racing Enterprises | Chevrolet | 147 | 0 | Running | 7 |
| 31 | 7 | 88 | Ty Majeski | ThorSport Racing | Ford | 123 | 0 | DVP | 19 |
| 32 | 21 | 44 | Andrés Pérez de Lara | Niece Motorsports | Chevrolet | 122 | 0 | Accident | 5 |
| 33 | 28 | 81 | Kris Wright | McAnally–Hilgemann Racing | Chevrolet | 111 | 0 | Suspension | 4 |
| 34 | 30 | 14 | Mini Tyrrell (R) | Kaulig Racing | Ram | 93 | 0 | Steering | 3 |
| 35 | 31 | 22 | Josh Reaume | Team Reaume | Ford | 51 | 0 | Suspension | 2 |
| 36 | 15 | 99 | Ben Rhodes | ThorSport Racing | Ford | 2 | 0 | Accident | 1 |
Official race results

=== Race statistics ===
- Lead changes: 14 among 8 different drivers
- Cautions/Laps: 9 for 47 laps
- Red flags: 0
- Time of race: 2 hours, 12 minutes and 39 seconds
- Average speed: 97.005 miles per hour (156.114 km/h)

== Standings after the race ==
Drivers' Championship standings

| | Pos | Driver | Points |
|---|---|---|---|
| | 1 | Chandler Smith | 172 |
| 4 | 2 | Kaden Honeycutt | 139 (–33) |
| 2 | 3 | Layne Riggs | 131 (–41) |
| | 4 | Gio Ruggiero | 127 (–45) |
| 2 | 5 | Ty Majeski | 121 (–51) |
| 3 | 6 | Christian Eckes | 119 (–53) |
| 5 | 7 | Ben Rhodes | 119 (–53) |
| 13 | 8 | Corey Heim | 114 (–58) |
| 2 | 9 | Andrés Pérez de Lara | 90 (–82) |
| | 10 | Justin Haley | 89 (–83) |
Official driver's standings

Manufacturers' Championship standings

| | Pos | Manufacturer | Points |
|---|---|---|---|
| | 1 | Ford | 168 |
| 1 | 2 | Toyota | 156 (–12) |
| 1 | 3 | Chevrolet | 155 (–13) |
| | 4 | Ram | 111 (–57) |

- Note: Only the first 10 positions are included for the driver standings.

| Previous race: 2026 OnlyBulls Green Flag 150 | NASCAR Craftsman Truck Series; 2026 season | Next race: 2026 Black's Tire 200 |
