= Caleb Costner =

American racing driver (born 1993)

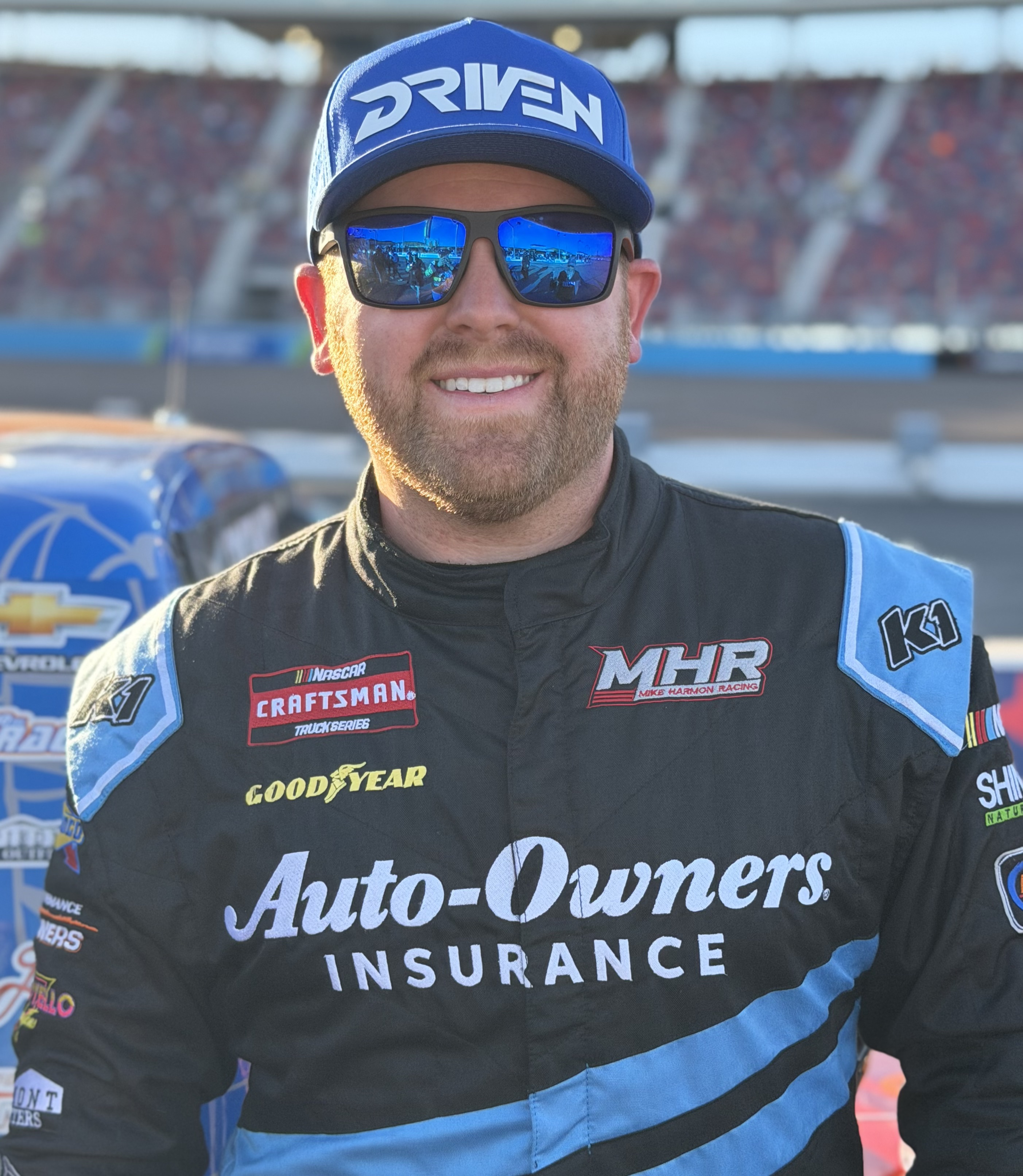
- Costner at Phoenix Raceway in 2025
- Born: Caleb Dean Costner; March 3, 1993 (age 33); Dallas, North Carolina, U.S.

NASCAR FedEx Freight Truck Series career
- 14 races run over 2 years
- 2026 position: 46th
- Best finish: 43rd (2025)
- First race: 2025 eero 250 (Richmond)
- Last race: 2026 RaceToStopSuicide.com 200 (Kansas)
Wins	Top tens	Poles
0	0	0

ARCA Menards Series career
- 14 races run over 4 years
- ARCA no., team: No. 85 (City Garage Motorsports)
- Best finish: 33rd (2023)
- First race: 2023 BRANDT 200 (Daytona)
- Last race: 2026 General Tire 200 (Daytona)
Wins	Top tens	Poles
0	1	0

ARCA Menards Series East career
- 5 races run over 4 years
- Best finish: 28th (2024)
- First race: 2022 Race to Stop Suicide 200 (New Smyrna)
- Last race: 2025 Rockingham ARCA 125 (Rockingham)
Wins	Top tens	Poles
0	2	0

ARCA Menards Series West career
- 3 races run over 2 years
- Best finish: 35th (2021)
- First race: 2021 NAPA Auto Care 150 (Roseville)
- Last race: 2024 General Tire 150 (Phoenix)
Wins	Top tens	Poles
0	0	0
- Statistics up to date as of November 6, 2026.

Caleb Dean Costner (born March 3, 1993) is an American professional stock car racing driver. He competes part-time in the ARCA Menards Series, driving the No. 85 Ford for City Garage Motorsports. He has previously competed in the NASCAR Craftsman Truck Series, the ARCA Menards Series East, and the ARCA Menards Series West.

Costner is also a third-generation race car driver in his family, following after his uncle and grandfather.

== Racing career ==
=== ARCA ===
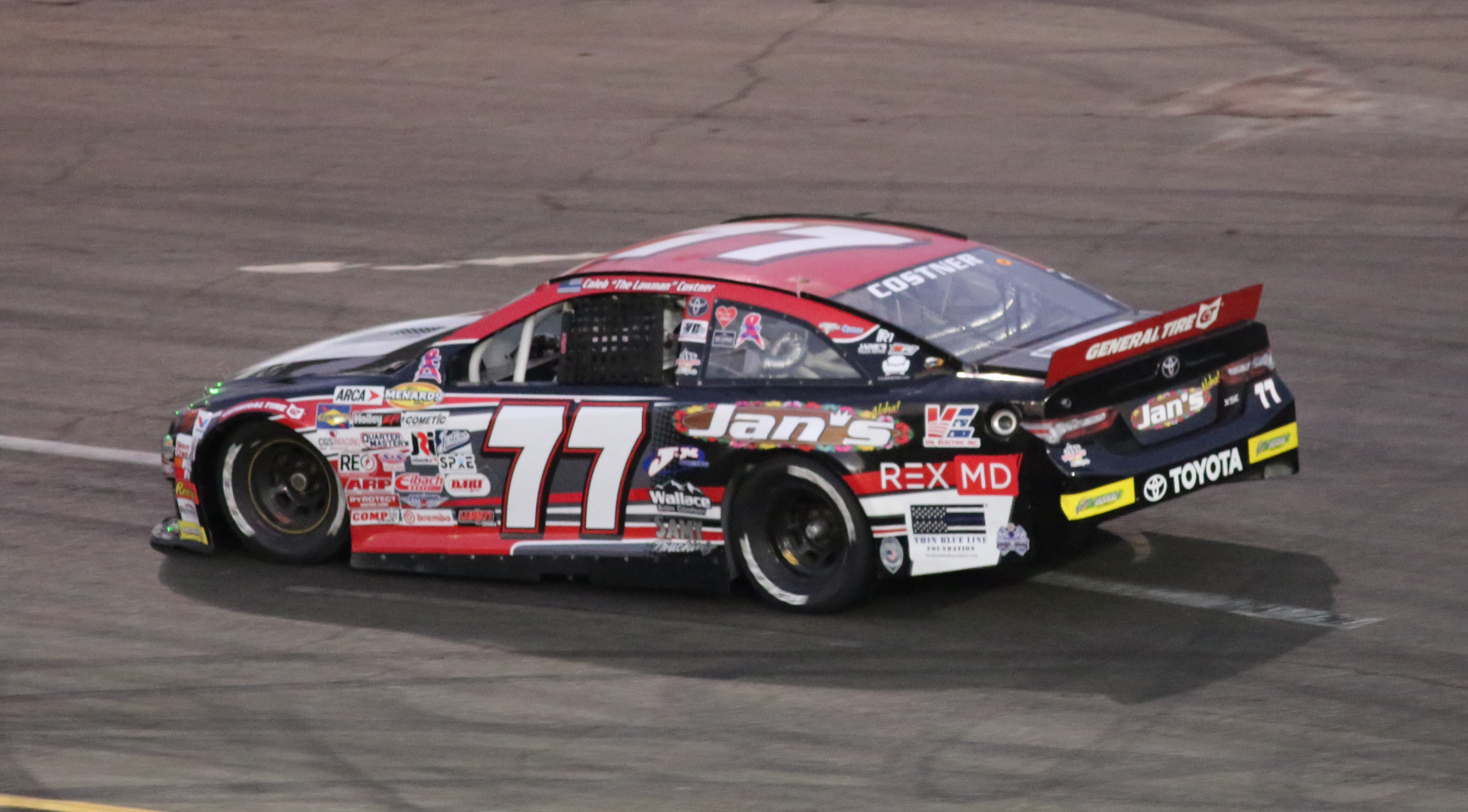
Costner's car at All American Speedway in 2021

Costner made his ARCA Menards Series West debut in 2021. He attempted to make his debut in the No. 77 Toyota Camry sponsored by Thin Blue Wine Cellars and Jan's Towing at the Portland International Raceway, but did not start due to engine issues. He ended up making his debut at the All-American Speedway, finishing fourteenth of a strong 24-car field in the No. 77 Toyota Camry sponsored by Thin Blue Wine Cellars and Jan's Towing. He then finished the 2021 season up in the No. 08 Toyota Camry for Kart Idaho with new sponsor Innovative Tiny Houses by finishing 30th after losing his brakes with 40 laps to go at Phoenix.

In 2022, Costner made his ARCA Menards Series East debut for the newly formed Costner Weaver Motorsports at New Smyrna Speedway. He failed to finish the race due to an overheating issue, placing him in thirteenth.

On January 4, 2023, Costner announced that he would make his ARCA Menards Series debut for Costner Weaver Motorsports in the season-opener race at Daytona. He finished 24th after running near the top twenty throughout most of the race. He returned for Talladega, earning a finish of 21st, despite blowing a right front tire in the closing laps of the race. He made his third start at his home track, Charlotte Motor Speedway, finishing thirteenth, his best career finish.

On January 4, 2024, it was announced that Costner would run full-time in the main ARCA series for CWM in 2024, driving the No. 93 car. After not being listed on the entry list for the spring race at Kansas, it was announced on May 3 that Costner would scale down to a part-time schedule and run select races for the rest of the season, due to a lack of funding.

=== NASCAR Craftsman Truck Series ===
On July 3, 2023, it was announced that Costner would attempt to make his NASCAR Craftsman Truck Series debut at the Mid-Ohio Sports Car Course, driving the No. 34 for Reaume Brothers Racing, although he would ultimately fail to qualify.

On June 16, 2025, it was revealed that Costner would once again attempt to make his debut in the Truck Series, this time driving the No. 74 Toyota for Mike Harmon Racing at Richmond Raceway.

== Motorsports career results ==
=== Stock car career summary ===
Season	Series	Team	Races	Wins	Top 5	Top 10	Points	Position
2021	ARCA Menards Series West	Performance P–1 Motorsports	1	0	0	0	47	35th
2021	ARCA Menards Series West	Kart Idaho Racing	1	0	0	0	47	35th
2022	ARCA Menards Series East	Costner Weaver Motorsports	1	0	0	0	31	48th
2023	ARCA Menards Series East	Costner Weaver Motorsports	1	0	0	0	30	47th
2023	ARCA Menards Series	Costner Weaver Motorsports	5	0	0	0	133	33rd
2023	NASCAR Craftsman Truck Series	Reaume Brothers Racing	0	0	0	0	0	116th
2024	ARCA Menards Series West	CW Motorsports	1	0	0	0	19	71st
2024	ARCA Menards Series East	CW Motorsports	2	0	0	2	72	28th
2024	ARCA Menards Series	CW Motorsports	5	0	0	1	108	39th
2025	ARCA Menards Series East	Costner Motorsports	1	0	0	0	22	66th
2025	ARCA Menards Series	Costner Motorsports	3	0	0	0	71	66th
2025	NASCAR Craftsman Truck Series	Mike Harmon Racing	6	0	0	0	39	43rd
2026	ARCA Menards Series	Costner Motorsports	1	0	0	0	12	131st
2026	NASCAR Craftsman Truck Series	Costner Motorsports	8	0	0	0	57	46th

=== NASCAR ===
(key) (Bold – Pole position awarded by qualifying time. Italics – Pole position earned by points standings or practice time. * – Most laps led.)

==== Craftsman Truck Series ====
NASCAR Craftsman Truck Series results
Year	Team	No.	Make	1	2	3	4	5	6	7	8	9	10	11	12	13	14	15	16	17	18	19	20	21	22	23	24	25	NCTC	Pts	Ref
2023	Reaume Brothers Racing	34	Ford	DAY	LVS	ATL	COA	TEX	BRD	MAR	KAN	DAR	NWS	CHA	GTW	NSH	MOH; DNQ	POC	RCH	IRP	MLW	KAN	BRI	TAL	HOM	PHO			116th	0	
2025	Mike Harmon Racing	74	Toyota	DAY	ATL	LVS	HOM	MAR	BRI	CAR	TEX	KAN	NWS	CLT	NSH	MCH	POC	LRP	IRP	GLN	RCH; 30	DAR; 28	BRI; 35	NHA; 33	ROV	TAL; 35	MAR		43rd	39	
2025	Mike Harmon Racing	74	Chevy																									PHO; 22	43rd	39	
2026	Costner Motorsports	93	Chevy	DAY	ATL; 33	STP	DAR; 27	CAR; 33	BRI; Wth	TEX; 24	GLN	DOV; 35	CLT; DNQ	NSH; 25	MCH; 27	COR	LRP	NWS	IRP	RCH; DNQ	NHA	BRI	KAN; 35	CLT	PHO	TAL	MAR	HOM	46th	57	

^{*} Season still in progress
^{1} Ineligible for series points

=== ARCA Menards Series ===
(key) (Bold – Pole position awarded by qualifying time. Italics – Pole position earned by points standings or practice time. * – Most laps led. ** – All laps led.)

ARCA Menards Series results
Year	Team	No.	Make	1	2	3	4	5	6	7	8	9	10	11	12	13	14	15	16	17	18	19	20	AMSC	Pts	Ref
2023	Costner Weaver Motorsports	93	Chevy	DAY; 24	PHO	TAL; 21	KAN	CLT; 13	BLN	ELK	MOH	IOW	POC	MCH; 15	IRP	GLN	ISF	MLW	DSF	KAN	BRI; 14	SLM	TOL	33rd	133	
2024	CW Motorsports	93	Chevy	DAY; 35	PHO; 25	TAL; 13	DOV; 9	KAN	CLT; 30	IOW	MOH	BLN	IRP	SLM	ELK	MCH	ISF	MLW	DSF	GLN	BRI	KAN	TOL	39th	108	
2025	CW Motorsports	93	Chevy	DAY; 38	PHO	TAL; 12	KAN	CLT	MCH; 11	BLN	ELK	LRP	DOV	IRP	IOW	GLN	ISF	MAD	DSF	BRI	SLM	KAN	TOL	66th	71	
2026	Costner Motorsports	93	Chevy	DAY; 32	PHO	KAN	TAL	GLN	TOL	MCH	POC	BER	ELK	CHI	LRP	IRP	IOW	ISF	MAD	DSF	SLM	BRI	KAN	131st	12	

==== ARCA Menards Series East ====
ARCA Menards Series East results
Year	Team	No.	Make	1	2	3	4	5	6	7	8	AMSEC	Pts	Ref
2022	Costner Weaver Motorsports	95	Chevy	NSM; 13	FIF	DOV	NSV	IOW	MLW	BRI		48th	31	
2023	Costner Weaver Motorsports	93	Chevy	FIF	DOV	NSV	FRS	IOW	IRP	MLW	BRI; 14	47th	30	
2024	CW Motorsports	93	Chevy	FIF	DOV; 9	NSV; 7	FRS	IOW	IRP	MLW	BRI	28th	72	
2025	CW Motorsports	39	Toyota	FIF	CAR; 22	NSV	FRS	DOV	IRP	IOW	BRI	66th	22	

==== ARCA Menards Series West ====
ARCA Menards Series West results
Year	Team	No.	Make	1	2	3	4	5	6	7	8	9	10	11	12	AMSWC	Pts	Ref
2021	Performance P-1 Motorsports	77	Toyota	PHO	SON	IRW	CNS	IRW	PIR	LVS	AAS; 14					35th	47	
2021	Kart Idaho Racing	08	Toyota									PHO; 30				35th	47	
2024	CW Motorsports	93	Chevy	PHO; 25	KER	PIR	SON	IRW	IRW	SHA	TRI	MAD	AAS	KER	PHO	71st	19	
