= Brenden Queen =

American racing driver (born 1997)

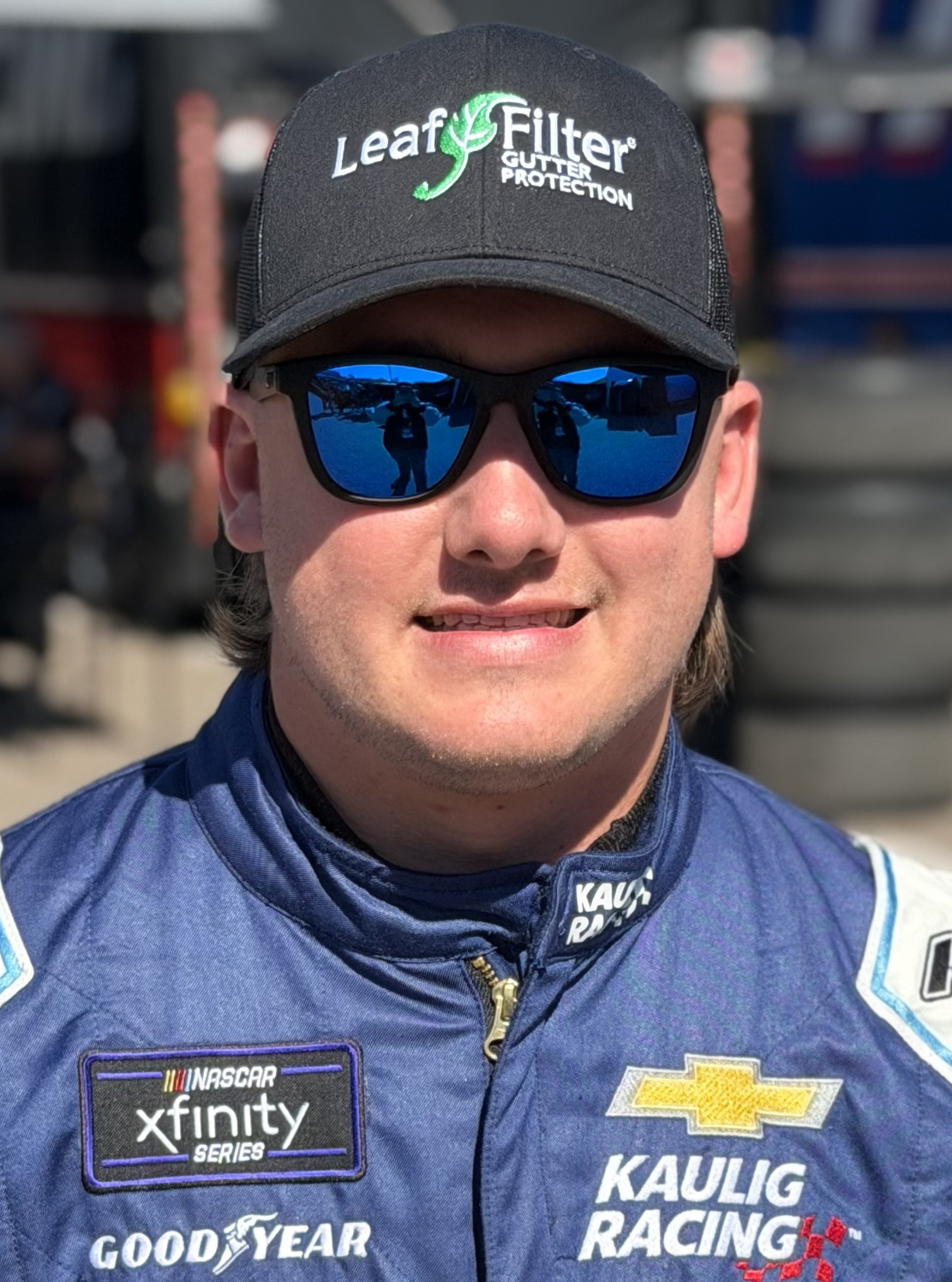
- Queen at Phoenix Raceway in 2025
- Born: Brenden Michael Queen; November 21, 1997 (age 28); Chesapeake, Virginia, U.S.
- Achievements: 2025 ARCA Menards Series Champion; 2024 CARS Late Model Stock Car Tour Champion; 2022 South Carolina 400 Winner; 2020, 2023, 2024 Hampton Heat Winner; 2023 Thanksgiving All-Star Classic Winner; 2023 Battle of the Stars Winner

NASCAR O'Reilly Auto Parts Series career
- 5 races run over 1 year
- 2025 position: 41st
- Best finish: 41st (2025)
- First race: 2025 Food City 300 (Bristol)
- Last race: 2025 NASCAR Xfinity Series Championship Race (Phoenix)
Wins	Top tens	Poles
0	1	0

NASCAR FedEx Freight Truck Series career
- 30 races run over 3 years
- Truck no., team: No. 12 (Kaulig Racing)
- 2026 position: 13th
- Best finish: 13th (2026)
- First race: 2024 Wright Brand 250 (North Wilkesboro)
- Last race: 2026 Craftsman 200 (Homestead)
Wins	Top tens	Poles
0	7	0

ARCA Menards Series career
- 21 races run over 2 years
- Best finish: 1st (2025)
- First race: 2019 Lucas Oil 200 (Daytona)
- Last race: 2025 Owens Corning 200 (Toledo)
- First win: 2025 Ride the 'Dente 200 (Daytona)
- Last win: 2025 Reese's 150 (Kansas)
Wins	Top tens	Poles
8	17	4

ARCA Menards Series East career
- 4 races run over 1 year
- Best finish: 8th (2025)
- First race: 2025 General Tire 150 (Dover)
- Last race: 2025 Bush's Beans 200 (Bristol)
- First win: 2025 General Tire 150 (Dover)
- Last win: 2025 Atlas 150 (Iowa)
Wins	Top tens	Poles
2	4	1

ARCA Menards Series West career
- 1 race run over 1 year
- Best finish: 41st (2025)
- First race: 2025 General Tire 150 (Phoenix)
Wins	Top tens	Poles
0	1	0
- Statistics up to date as of November 6, 2026.

Brenden Michael Queen (born November 21, 1997), nicknamed Butterbean, is an American professional stock car racing driver. He competes full-time in the NASCAR Craftsman Truck Series, driving the No. 12 Ram 1500 for Kaulig Racing. He is the 2025 ARCA Menards Series champion and the 2024 CARS Late Model Stock Car Tour champion.

== Racing career ==
Queen started racing at the age of six in go-karts at Langley Speedway, then quickly moved to dirt go-karts with the Albemarle Kart Club on the same grounds as Dixieland Speedway in Elizabeth City, NC. After numerous championships in kart racing, Queen advanced to the legend division at his home track of Langley Speedway. After more championships in the legend division, he moved to the Late Model Stock division. During these years, he was mentored by Phil Warren, a seven-time Langley track champion, who served as his crew chief starting in the mid-2010s. Queen won three consecutive track championships at Langley in 2020, 2021, and 2022. He also won the 2016 late model stock track championship at East Carolina Motor Speedway and the 2022 dirt late model track championship at Dixieland Speedway.

=== CARS Tour ===
In 2022, Queen joined Lee Pulliam Performance to run full-time in the CARS Tour in 2023, but made a splash in November 2022 by winning the 30th Annual Charlie Powell Memorial 400 at Florence Motor Speedway, one of the major post-season races for Late Models (had been known as the Myrtle Beach 400 before the race was moved to Timmonsville).

Queen won the 2023 CARS Tour race at North Wilkesboro held on the Wednesday before the track's Truck Series race and Cup Series race. Some NASCAR drivers, including Dale Earnhardt Jr., were also in that CARS Tour race.

=== ARCA Menards Series ===
In 2019, Queen made his ARCA debut in the season-opener at Daytona in the No. 35 car for Vizion Motorsports after previously competing in the series' preseason testing at the track in January for the team. Vizion team owners Jennifer and Teddy Brown were so impressed by Queen's late model performances that they invited him to test and race their car at Daytona. After the race at Daytona, Queen tweeted that he would run full-time for Vizion in the No. 35 car but he and the team did not end up running any more races that year due to the team's financial problems.

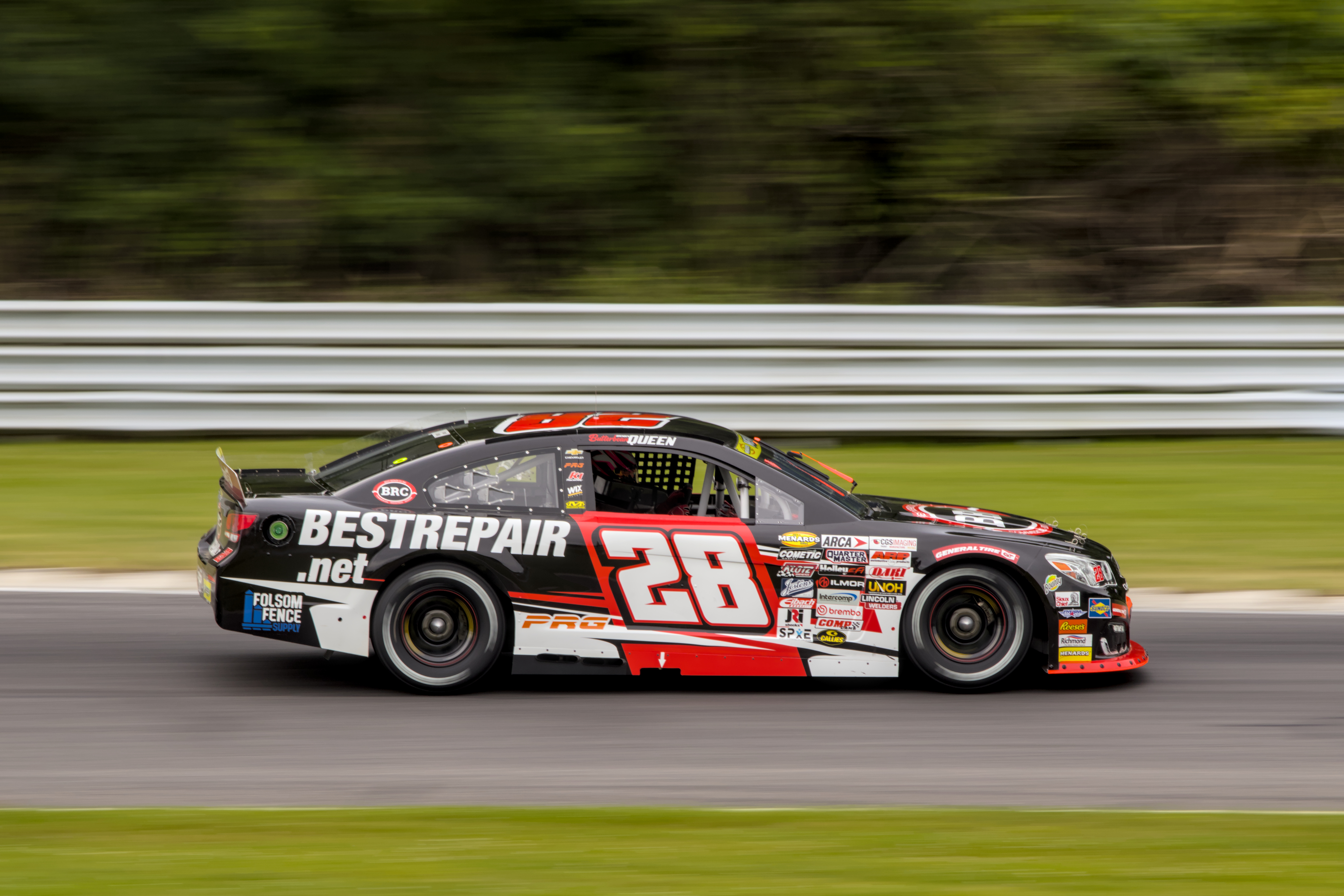
Queen's No. 28 car at Lime Rock Park in 2025

On December 4, 2024, it was announced that Queen would return to the ARCA Menards Series, driving the No. 28 Chevrolet for Pinnacle Racing Group on a full-time basis. In the season opener at Daytona, Queen scored his first career win in the series. He would earn wins at Kansas in May, Michigan, Dover, Iowa, DuQuion, Salem, and Kansas in September to secure the series championship.

=== NASCAR Craftsman Truck Series ===
On March 8, 2024, it was announced that Queen would make his Truck Series debut in the race at North Wilkesboro driving the No. 1 truck for Tricon Garage.

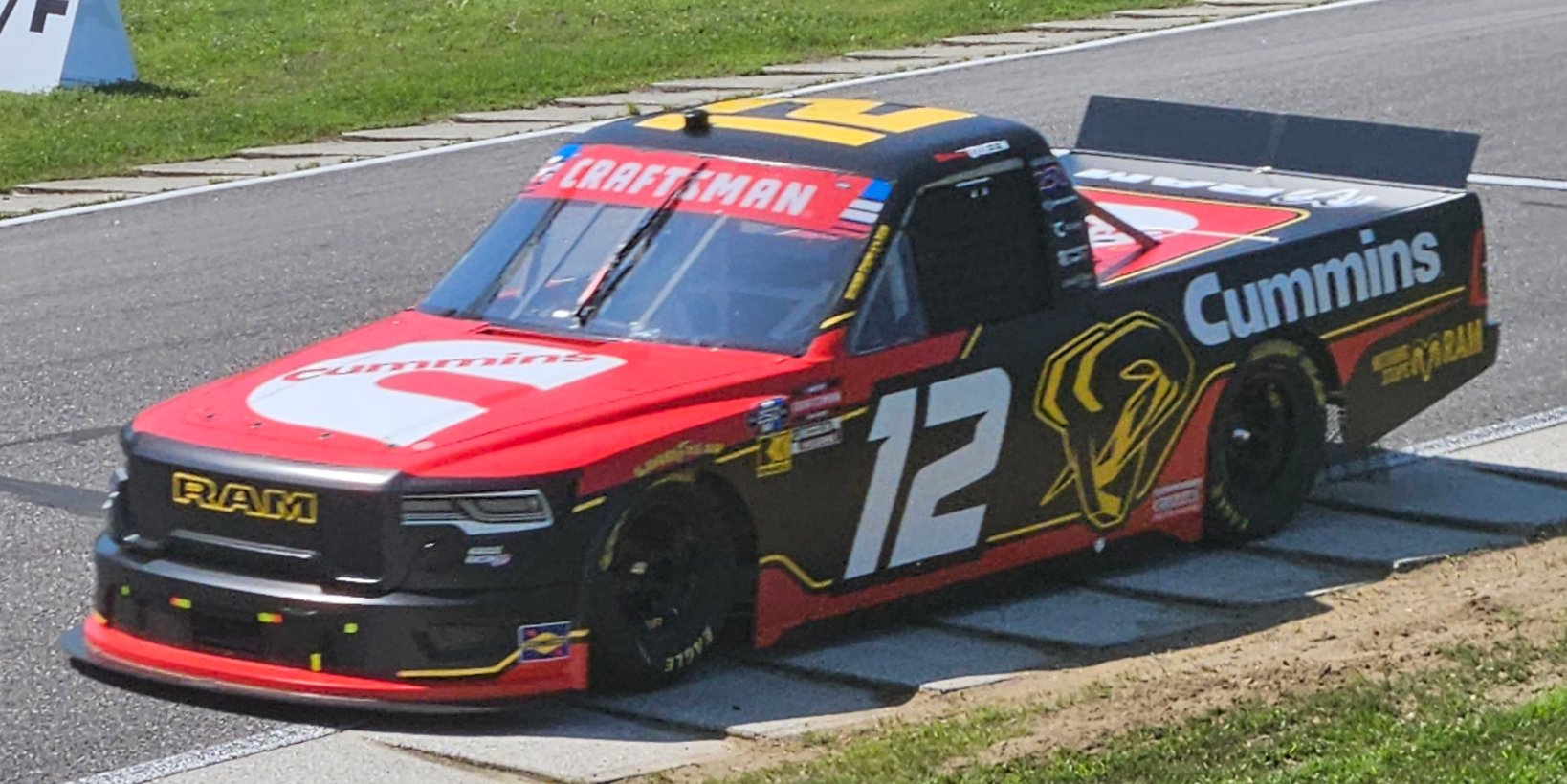
Queen's No. 12 truck at Lime Rock Park in 2026.

On July 15, 2025, it was announced that Queen would compete in the event at IRP with Spire Motorsports in their No. 07 truck.

On October 16, 2025, it was announced that Queen will run full-time for the 2026 season, driving for Kaulig Racing. He started the 2026 season with an seventh-place finish at Daytona.

=== NASCAR Xfinity Series ===
On September 5, 2025, it was announced that Queen would make his Xfinity Series debut at Bristol Motor Speedway, driving the No. 11 Chevrolet for Kaulig Racing. He finished twentieth in his maiden race. He later was invited to do the race at Kansas with Kaulig, where he led his first career Xfinity laps and finished ninth. He would later be announced to run the remainder of the season with the team starting at Talladega Superspeedway.

== Personal life ==
Queen is from Chesapeake, Virginia and frequently competes at his home track of Langley Speedway. He got his nickname "Butterbean" from boxer Eric Esch who also has that nickname as Queen looked like him when he was born and early in his life. His father, Mike, was also a racing driver. Queen is currently attending Old Dominion University, where he will earn a degree in mechanical engineering. Queen is known for eating at Waffle House after winning races.

== Motorsports career results ==
=== Racing career summary ===
Season	Series	Team	Races	Wins	Top 5	Top 10	Points	Position
2019	CARS Late Model Stock Car Tour	Mike Queen	1	0	0	0	15	55th
2019	ARCA Menards Series	Vizion Motorsports	1	0	0	0	85	82nd
2022	CARS Late Model Stock Car Tour	N/A	2	1	1	1	41	39th
2023	CARS Late Model Stock Car Tour	Lee Pulliam Performance	16	4	12	15	490	**2nd**
2024	CARS Late Model Stock Car Tour	Lee Pulliam Performance	17	2	12	12	466	**1st**
2024	NASCAR Craftsman Truck Series	Tricon Garage	3	0	1	1	68	38th
2025	ARCA Menards Series West	Pinnacle Racing Group	1	0	1	1	44	41st
2025	ARCA Menards Series East	Pinnacle Racing Group	4	2	4	4	231	8th
2025	ARCA Menards Series	Pinnacle Racing Group	20	8	17	17	1034	**1st**
2025	NASCAR Craftsman Truck Series	Spire Motorsports	2	0	0	1	0	NC†
2025	NASCAR Xfinity Series	Kaulig Racing	5	0	0	1	88	41st
2026	CARS Late Model Stock Car Tour	Lee Pulliam Performance	3	0	3	3	115	33rd
2026	NASCAR Craftsman Truck Series	Kaulig Racing	25	0	0	5	514	13th

^{†} As Queen was a guest driver, he was ineligible for championship points.

=== NASCAR ===
(key) (Bold – Pole position awarded by qualifying time. Italics – Pole position earned by points standings or practice time. * – Most laps led.)

==== Xfinity Series ====
NASCAR Xfinity Series results
Year	Team	No.	Make	1	2	3	4	5	6	7	8	9	10	11	12	13	14	15	16	17	18	19	20	21	22	23	24	25	26	27	28	29	30	31	32	33	NXSC	Pts	Ref
2025	Kaulig Racing	11	Chevy	DAY	ATL	COA	PHO	LVS	HOM	MAR	DAR	BRI	CAR	TAL	TEX	CLT	NSH	MXC	POC	ATL	CSC	SON	DOV	IND	IOW	GLN	DAY	PIR	GTW	BRI; 20	KAN; 9	ROV	LVS	TAL; 36	MAR; 35	PHO; 19	41st	88	

==== Craftsman Truck Series ====
NASCAR Craftsman Truck Series results
Year	Team	No.	Make	1	2	3	4	5	6	7	8	9	10	11	12	13	14	15	16	17	18	19	20	21	22	23	24	25	NCTC	Pts	Ref
2024	Tricon Garage	1	Toyota	DAY	ATL	LVS	BRI	COA	MAR	TEX	KAN	DAR	NWS; 4	CLT	GTW	NSH; 19	POC	IRP	RCH	MLW	BRI	KAN; 20	TAL	HOM	MAR	PHO			38th	68	
2025	Spire Motorsports	07	Chevy	DAY	ATL	LVS	HOM	MAR	BRI	CAR	TEX	KAN	NWS	CLT	NSH	MCH	POC	LRP	IRP; 16	GLN	RCH	DAR	BRI	NHA	ROV	TAL			90th	0^{1}	
2025	Spire Motorsports	7	Chevy																								MAR; 10	PHO	90th	0^{1}	
2026	Kaulig Racing	12	Ram	DAY; 7	ATL; 16	STP; 24	DAR; 20	CAR; 27	BRI; 10	TEX; 13	GLN; 9	DOV; 13	CLT; 32	NSH; 19	MCH; 14	COR; 7	LRP; 12	NWS; 21	IRP; 20	RCH; 20	NHA; 20	BRI; 21	KAN; 14	CLT; 13	PHO; 23	TAL; 7	MAR; 12	HOM; 20	13th	514	

^{*} Season still in progress
^{1} Ineligible for series points

=== ARCA Menards Series ===
(key) (Bold – Pole position awarded by qualifying time. Italics – Pole position earned by points standings or practice time. * – Most laps led.)

ARCA Menards Series results
Year	Team	No.	Make	1	2	3	4	5	6	7	8	9	10	11	12	13	14	15	16	17	18	19	20	AMSC	Pts	Ref
2019	Vizion Motorsports	35	Toyota	DAY; 29	FIF	SLM	TAL	NSH	TOL	CLT	POC	MCH	MAD	GTW	CHI	ELK	IOW	POC	ISF	DSF	SLM	IRP	KAN	82nd	85	
2025	Pinnacle Racing Group	28	Chevy	DAY; 1	PHO; 2*	TAL; 25	KAN; 1*	CLT; 14	**MCH**; 1*	BLN; 4	**ELK**; 2*	LRP; 4	**DOV**; 1**	IRP; 3*	IOW; 1*	GLN; 21	ISF; 4	MAD; 3	DSF; 1	BRI; 3	SLM; 1	**KAN**; 1	TOL; 2	1st	1034	

==== ARCA Menards Series East ====
ARCA Menards Series East results
Year	Team	No.	Make	1	2	3	4	5	6	7	8	AMSEC	Pts	Ref
2025	Pinnacle Racing Group	28	Chevy	FIF	CAR	NSV	FRS	**DOV**; 1**	IRP; 3*	IOW; 1*	BRI; 3	8th	231	

==== ARCA Menards Series West ====
ARCA Menards Series West results
Year	Team	No.	Make	1	2	3	4	5	6	7	8	9	10	11	12	AMSWC	Pts	Ref
2025	Pinnacle Racing Group	28	Chevy	KER	PHO; 2*	TUC	CNS	KER	SON	TRI	PIR	AAS	MAD	LVS	PHO	41st	44	

=== CARS Late Model Stock Car Tour ===
(key) (Bold – Pole position awarded by qualifying time. Italics – Pole position earned by points standings or practice time. * – Most laps led. ** – All laps led.)

CARS Late Model Stock Car Tour results
Year	Team	No.	Make	1	2	3	4	5	6	7	8	9	10	11	12	13	14	15	16	17	CLMSCTC	Pts	Ref
2019	Mike Queen	03	Chevy	SNM	HCY	ROU	ACE	MMS	LGY; 18	DOM	CCS	HCY	ROU	SBO							55th	15	
2022	N/A	03	Toyota	CRW	HCY	GRE	AAS	FCS	LGY; 1	DOM	HCY	ACE	MMS	NWS; 26	TCM	ACE	SBO	CRW			39th	41	
2023	Lee Pulliam Performance	03	Toyota	SNM; 7	FLC; 2	HCY; 10	ACE; 4	**NWS**; 1*	LGY; 2	**DOM**; 2*	CRW; 6		ACE; 5*	**TCM**; 16*	WKS; 4	**AAS**; 1	SBO; 4	**TCM**; 1**	**CRW**; 1**		2nd	490	
2023	Lee Pulliam Performance	55S	Toyota									HCY; 3									2nd	490	
2024	Lee Pulliam Performance	03	Toyota	SNM; 19	HCY; 2	**AAS**; 11	OCS; 13	ACE; 2	**TCM**; 1**	LGY; 14	**DOM**; 1**	CRW; 23	HCY; 5	**NWS**; 5*	ACE; 4	WCS; 3	FLC; 2	SBO; 5	TCM; 3	NWS; 5	1st	466	
2026	Lee Pulliam Performance	03	Dodge	SNM	WCS	NSV	CRW	ACE	LGY	DOM; 3	NWS; 5	HCY	AND	FLC; 5	TCM	NPS	SBO				33rd	115	

Sporting positions
Preceded by Andrés Pérez de Lara	ARCA Menards Series Champion; 2025	Succeeded by Thomas Annunziata
