= 2026 Fr8 208 =

NASCAR Craftsman Truck Series race at EchoPark Speedway

Race details
- Race 2 of 25 in the 2026 NASCAR Craftsman Truck Series
- Date: February 21, 2026
- Location: EchoPark Speedway in Hampton, Georgia
- Course: Permanent racing facility
- Course length: 1.54 miles (2.48 km)
- Distance: 125 laps, 192.5 mi (309.7 km)
- Scheduled distance: 135 laps, 207.9 mi (334.6 km)
- Average speed: 131.027 miles per hour (210.868 km/h)

Pole position
Driver	Jake Garcia	ThorSport Racing
- Time: 32.050

Most laps led
Driver	Ben Rhodes	ThorSport Racing
- Laps: 70

Fastest lap
Driver	Tanner Gray	Tricon Garage
- Time: 30.636

Winner
No. 7	Kyle Busch	Spire Motorsports

Television in the United States
- Network: FS1
- Announcers: Jamie Little, Ryan Blaney, and Joey Logano

Radio in the United States
- Radio: NRN
- Booth announcers: Brad Gillie, Ross Chastain, and Nick Yeoman
- Turn announcers: Doug Turnbull (1 & 2) and Jack Johnson (3 & 4)

The 2026 Fr8 208 was a NASCAR Craftsman Truck Series race held on Saturday, February 21, 2026, at EchoPark Speedway in Hampton, Georgia. Contested over 125 laps—shortened from 135 laps due to time constraints with the O'Reilly Auto Parts Series race on the 1.54-mile-long (2.48 km) asphalt quad-oval intermediate speedway (with superspeedway rules), it was the second race of the 2026 NASCAR Craftsman Truck Series season, and the 18th running of the event.

In a shortened race, Kyle Busch, driving for Spire Motorsports, survived late chaos and led the final seven laps to earn his 68th career NASCAR Craftsman Truck Series win, his first of the season, and his third consecutive win in the Atlanta truck race. Carson Hocevar finished second, and Gio Ruggiero finished third. Ben Rhodes and Corey Heim rounded out the top five, while Chandler Smith, Jake Garcia, John Hunter Nemechek, Ricky Stenhouse Jr., and Justin Haley rounded out the top ten.

== Report ==
=== Background ===
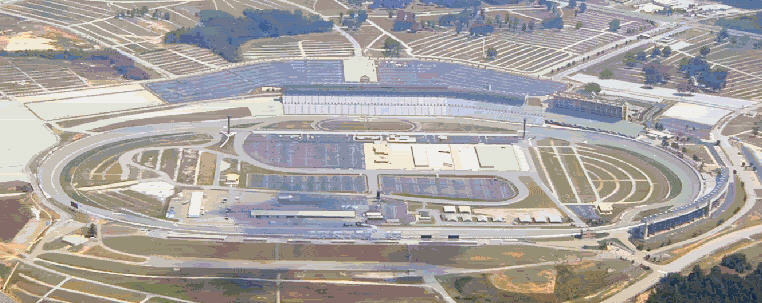
Atlanta Motor Speedway, the circuit where the race will be held.

Atlanta Motor Speedway is a 1.54-mile race track in Hampton, Georgia, United States, 20 miles (32 km) south of Atlanta. It has annually hosted NASCAR Xfinity Series stock car races since 1992.

The venue was bought by Speedway Motorsports in 1990. In 1994, 46 condominiums were built over the northeastern side of the track. In 1997, to standardize the track with Speedway Motorsports' other two intermediate ovals, the entire track was almost completely rebuilt. The frontstretch and backstretch were swapped, and the configuration of the track was changed from oval to quad-oval, with a new official length of 1.54-mile (2.48 km) where before it was 1.522-mile (2.449 km). The project made the track one of the fastest on the NASCAR circuit. In July 2021 NASCAR announced that the track would be reprofiled for the 2022 season to have 28 degrees of banking and would be narrowed from 55 to 40 feet which the track claims will turn racing at the track similar to restrictor plate superspeedways. Despite the reprofiling being criticized by drivers, construction began in August 2021 and wrapped up in December 2021. The track has seating capacity of 71,000 to 125,000 people depending on the tracks configuration.

On June 3, 2025, SMI announced the track's renaming to EchoPark Speedway under a new seven-year sponsorship deal with the Smith family-owned business, EchoPark. The renaming ended a 35-year stint under the Atlanta Motor Speedway name.

==== Entry list ====
- (R) denotes rookie driver.
- (i) denotes driver who is ineligible for series driver points.

#	Driver	Team	Make
1	Corey Heim	Tricon Garage	Toyota
2	Clayton Green	Team Reaume	Ford
5	Adam Andretti	Tricon Garage	Toyota
7	Kyle Busch (i)	Spire Motorsports	Chevrolet
9	Grant Enfinger	CR7 Motorsports	Chevrolet
10	Daniel Dye	Kaulig Racing	Ram
11	Kaden Honeycutt	Tricon Garage	Toyota
12	Brenden Queen (R)	Kaulig Racing	Ram
13	Cole Butcher (R)	ThorSport Racing	Ford
14	Mini Tyrrell (R)	Kaulig Racing	Ram
15	Tanner Gray	Tricon Garage	Toyota
16	Justin Haley	Kaulig Racing	Ram
17	Gio Ruggiero	Tricon Garage	Toyota
18	Tyler Ankrum	McAnally–Hilgemann Racing	Chevrolet
19	Daniel Hemric	McAnally–Hilgemann Racing	Chevrolet
22	Josh Reaume	Team Reaume	Ford
25	Ty Dillon (i)	Kaulig Racing	Ram
26	Dawson Sutton	Rackley W.A.R.	Chevrolet
33	Frankie Muniz	Team Reaume	Ford
34	Layne Riggs	Front Row Motorsports	Ford
38	Chandler Smith	Front Row Motorsports	Ford
42	Tyler Reif	Niece Motorsports	Chevrolet
44	Andrés Pérez de Lara	Niece Motorsports	Chevrolet
45	Ricky Stenhouse Jr. (i)	Niece Motorsports	Chevrolet
52	Stewart Friesen	Halmar Friesen Racing	Toyota
62	John Hunter Nemechek (i)	Halmar Friesen Racing	Toyota
69	Tyler Tomassi	MBM Motorsports	Ford
76	Spencer Boyd	Freedom Racing Enterprises	Chevrolet
77	Carson Hocevar (i)	Spire Motorsports	Chevrolet
81	Kris Wright	McAnally–Hilgemann Racing	Chevrolet
88	Ty Majeski	ThorSport Racing	Ford
90	Justin Carroll	TC Motorsports	Toyota
91	Christian Eckes	McAnally–Hilgemann Racing	Chevrolet
93	Caleb Costner	Costner Motorsports	Chevrolet
98	Jake Garcia	ThorSport Racing	Ford
99	Ben Rhodes	ThorSport Racing	Ford
Official entry list

== Qualifying ==
Qualifying was held on Friday, February 20, at 3:00 PM EST. Since EchoPark Speedway is an intermediate track with superspeedway rules, the qualifying procedure used was a single-car, single-lap system with two rounds. In the first round, drivers had one lap to set a time and determined positions 11–36. The fastest ten drivers from the first round advanced to the second and final round, and whoever set the fastest time in Round 2 won the pole and determined the rest of the starting lineup.

Jake Garcia, driving for ThorSport Racing, qualified on pole position, having advanced from the preliminary round and set the fastest time in Round 2, with a lap of 32.050 seconds, and a speed of 172.980 miles per hour (278.384 km/h).

No drivers failed to qualify.

=== Qualifying results ===
Pos.	#	Driver	Team	Make	Time (R1)	Speed (R1)	Time (R2)	Speed (R2)
1	98	Jake Garcia	ThorSport Racing	Ford	32.230	172.014	32.050	172.980
2	99	Ben Rhodes	ThorSport Racing	Ford	32.101	172.705	32.097	172.726
3	7	Kyle Busch (i)	Spire Motorsports	Chevrolet	32.202	172.163	32.109	172.662
4	18	Tyler Ankrum	McAnally–Hilgemann Racing	Chevrolet	32.154	172.420	32.138	172.506
5	45	Ricky Stenhouse Jr. (i)	Niece Motorsports	Chevrolet	32.238	171.971	32.249	171.912
6	13	Cole Butcher (R)	ThorSport Racing	Ford	32.174	172.313	32.260	171.854
7	88	Ty Majeski	ThorSport Racing	Ford	32.165	172.361	32.265	171.827
8	5	Adam Andretti	Tricon Garage	Toyota	32.219	172.072	32.321	171.529
9	44	Andrés Pérez de Lara	Niece Motorsports	Chevrolet	32.242	171.950	32.348	171.386
10	17	Gio Ruggiero	Tricon Garage	Toyota	32.155	172.415	—	—
Eliminated in Round 1
11	11	Kaden Honeycutt	Tricon Garage	Toyota	32.276	171.768	—	—
12	62	John Hunter Nemechek (i)	Halmar Friesen Racing	Toyota	32.310	171.588	—	—
13	19	Daniel Hemric	McAnally–Hilgemann Racing	Chevrolet	32.348	171.386	—	—
14	9	Grant Enfinger	CR7 Motorsports	Chevrolet	32.349	171.381	—	—
15	91	Christian Eckes	McAnally–Hilgemann Racing	Chevrolet	32.353	171.360	—	—
16	52	Stewart Friesen	Halmar Friesen Racing	Toyota	32.388	171.175	—	—
17	15	Tanner Gray	Tricon Garage	Toyota	32.482	170.679	—	—
18	77	Carson Hocevar (i)	Spire Motorsports	Chevrolet	32.494	170.616	—	—
19	34	Layne Riggs	Front Row Motorsports	Ford	32.497	170.600	—	—
20	1	Corey Heim	Tricon Garage	Toyota	32.512	170.522	—	—
21	81	Kris Wright	McAnally–Hilgemann Racing	Chevrolet	32.535	170.401	—	—
22	38	Chandler Smith	Front Row Motorsports	Ford	32.575	170.192	—	—
23	26	Dawson Sutton	Rackley W.A.R.	Chevrolet	32.628	169.915	—	—
24	76	Spencer Boyd	Freedom Racing Enterprises	Chevrolet	32.634	169.884	—	—
25	16	Justin Haley	Kaulig Racing	Ram	32.673	169.681	—	—
26	25	Ty Dillon (i)	Kaulig Racing	Ram	32.749	169.288	—	—
27	42	Tyler Reif	Niece Motorsports	Chevrolet	32.750	169.282	—	—
28	12	Brenden Queen (R)	Kaulig Racing	Ram	32.841	168.813	—	—
29	14	Mini Tyrrell (R)	Kaulig Racing	Ram	32.845	168.793	—	—
30	10	Daniel Dye	Kaulig Racing	Ram	32.854	168.747	—	—
31	22	Josh Reaume	Team Reaume	Ford	33.005	167.975	—	—
Qualified by owner's points
32	33	Frankie Muniz	Team Reaume	Ford	33.271	166.632	—	—
33	2	Clayton Green	Team Reaume	Ford	—	—	—	—
34	69	Tyler Tomassi	MBM Motorsports	Ford	—	—	—	—
35	90	Justin Carroll	TC Motorsports	Toyota	—	—	—	—
36	93	Caleb Costner	Costner Motorsports	Chevrolet	—	—	—	—
Official qualifying results
Official starting lineup

== Race ==
=== Race results ===
==== Stage Results ====
Stage One Laps: 40

Pos.	#	Driver	Team	Make	Pts
1	1	Corey Heim	Tricon Garage	Toyota	10
2	99	Ben Rhodes	ThorSport Racing	Ford	9
3	7	Kyle Busch (i)	Spire Motorsports	Chevrolet	0
4	77	Carson Hocevar (i)	Spire Motorsports	Chevrolet	0
5	88	Ty Majeski	ThorSport Racing	Ford	6
6	52	Stewart Friesen	Halmar Friesen Racing	Toyota	5
7	44	Andrés Pérez de Lara	Niece Motorsports	Chevrolet	4
8	11	Kaden Honeycutt	Tricon Garage	Toyota	3
9	19	Daniel Hemric	McAnally-Hilgemann Racing	Chevrolet	2
10	17	Gio Ruggiero	Tricon Garage	Toyota	1

Stage Two Laps: 40

Pos.	#	Driver	Team	Make	Pts
1	52	Stewart Friesen	Halmar Friesen Racing	Toyota	10
2	45	Ricky Stenhouse Jr. (i)	Niece Motorsports	Chevrolet	0
3	77	Carson Hocevar (i)	Spire Motorsports	Chevrolet	0
4	38	Chandler Smith	Front Row Motorsports	Ford	7
5	7	Kyle Busch (i)	Spire Motorsports	Chevrolet	0
6	17	Gio Ruggiero	Tricon Garage	Toyota	5
7	98	Jake Garcia	ThorSport Racing	Ford	4
8	44	Andrés Pérez de Lara	Niece Motorsports	Chevrolet	3
9	1	Corey Heim	Tricon Garage	Toyota	2
10	34	Layne Riggs	Front Row Motorsports	Ford	1

=== Final Stage Results ===
Stage Three Laps: 45

Fin	St	#	Driver	Team	Make	Laps	Led	Status	Pts
1	3	7	Kyle Busch (i)	Spire Motorsports	Chevrolet	125	37	Running	0
2	18	77	Carson Hocevar (i)	Spire Motorsports	Chevrolet	125	0	Running	0
3	10	17	Gio Ruggiero	Tricon Garage	Toyota	125	0	Running	40
4	2	99	Ben Rhodes	ThorSport Racing	Ford	125	70	Running	42
5	20	1	Corey Heim	Tricon Garage	Toyota	125	6	Running	44
6	22	38	Chandler Smith	Front Row Motorsports	Ford	125	0	Running	38
7	1	98	Jake Garcia	ThorSport Racing	Ford	125	2	Running	34
8	12	62	John Hunter Nemechek (i)	Halmar Friesen Racing	Toyota	125	0	Running	0
9	5	45	Ricky Stenhouse Jr. (i)	Niece Motorsports	Chevrolet	125	0	Running	0
10	25	16	Justin Haley	Kaulig Racing	Ram	125	0	Running	27
11	26	25	Ty Dillon (i)	Kaulig Racing	Ram	125	0	Running	0
12	8	5	Adam Andretti	Tricon Garage	Toyota	125	0	Running	25
13	30	10	Daniel Dye	Kaulig Racing	Ram	125	0	Running	24
14	4	18	Tyler Ankrum	McAnally–Hilgemann Racing	Chevrolet	125	0	Running	23
15	9	44	Andrés Pérez de Lara	Niece Motorsports	Chevrolet	125	0	Running	29
16	28	12	Brenden Queen (R)	Kaulig Racing	Ram	125	0	Running	21
17	27	42	Tyler Reif	Niece Motorsports	Chevrolet	125	0	Running	20
18	21	81	Kris Wright	McAnally–Hilgemann Racing	Chevrolet	125	0	Running	19
19	29	14	Mini Tyrrell (R)	Kaulig Racing	Ram	124	0	Running	18
20	16	52	Stewart Friesen	Halmar Friesen Racing	Toyota	124	10	Running	32
21	11	11	Kaden Honeycutt	Tricon Garage	Toyota	123	0	Running	19
22	14	9	Grant Enfinger	CR7 Motorsports	Chevrolet	123	0	Running	15
23	33	2	Clayton Green	Team Reaume	Ford	123	0	Running	14
24	31	22	Josh Reaume	Team Reaume	Ford	123	0	Running	13
25	32	33	Frankie Muniz	Team Reaume	Ford	123	0	Running	12
26	24	76	Spencer Boyd	Freedom Racing Enterprises	Chevrolet	120	0	Running	11
27	19	34	Layne Riggs	Front Row Motorsports	Ford	119	0	Running	11
28	7	88	Ty Majeski	ThorSport Racing	Ford	119	0	Running	15
29	34	69	Tyler Tomassi	MBM Motorsports	Ford	119	0	Running	8
30	17	15	Tanner Gray	Tricon Garage	Toyota	116	0	Running	8
31	6	13	Cole Butcher (R)	ThorSport Racing	Ford	100	0	Accident	6
32	23	26	Dawson Sutton	Rackley W.A.R.	Chevrolet	100	0	Accident	5
33	36	93	Caleb Costner	Costner Motorsports	Chevrolet	99	0	Handling	4
34	13	19	Daniel Hemric	McAnally–Hilgemann Racing	Chevrolet	88	0	Suspension	5
35	35	90	Justin Carroll	TC Motorsports	Toyota	65	0	Rear Gear	2
36	15	91	Christian Eckes	McAnally–Hilgemann Racing	Chevrolet	2	0	Transmission	1
Official race results

=== Race statistics ===
- Lead changes: 14 among 5 different drivers
- Cautions/Laps: 3 for 18 laps
- Red flags: 0
- Time of race: 1 hour, 28 minutes and 9 seconds
- Average speed: 131.027 miles per hour (210.868 km/h)

== Standings after the race ==
Drivers' Championship standings

	Pos	Driver	Points
	1	Chandler Smith	103
2	2	Gio Ruggiero	75 (–28)
7	3	Ben Rhodes	68 (–35)
1	4	Ty Majeski	60 (–43)
4	5	Stewart Friesen	59 (–44)
	6	Brenden Queen	53 (–50)
2	7	Kaden Honeycutt	53 (–50)
3	8	Andrés Pérez de Lara	53 (–50)
1	9	Tyler Ankrum	51 (–52)
8	10	Christian Eckes	47 (–56)
Official driver's standings

Manufacturers' Championship standings

	Pos	Manufacturer	Points
2	1	Chevrolet	89
1	2	Ford	88 (–1)
1	3	Toyota	69 (–20)
	4	Ram	57 (–32)

- Note: Only the first 10 positions are included for the driver standings.

Previous race: 2026 Fresh From Florida 250	NASCAR Craftsman Truck Series; 2026 season	Next race: 2026 OnlyBulls Green Flag 150
