= Buck Stevens =

American racing driver (born 1977)

- Born: March 11, 1977 (age 49); Milford, Delaware, U.S.

ARCA Menards Series career
- 3 races run over 2 years
- Best finish: 64th (2022)
- First race: 2018 Southern Illinois 100 (DuQuoin)
- Last race: 2022 Southern Illinois 100 (DuQuoin)
Wins	Top tens	Poles
0	0	0
- Statistics up to date as of September 11, 2024.

James "Buck" Stevens (born March 11, 1977) is an American professional stock car racing driver who last competed in the ARCA Menards Series, driving the No. 44 Ford for Ferrier McClure Racing.

In 2018, Stevens attempted to make his debut in the ARCA Racing Series at the Illinois State Fairgrounds dirt track, driving the No. 06 Dodge for Wayne Peterson Racing, where he was forced to withdraw after blowing an engine during the lone practice session. He returned with the team to the DuQuoin State Fairgrounds dirt track, this time driving a Ford, where after starting 21st and last, he went on to finish fourteenth due to transmission issues. For the following year, Stevens was originally scheduled to drive at Springfield for the team, this time driving the No. 0 Ford, but was replaced by team-owner Wayne Peterson.

In 2022, Stevens returned to the series at Springfield, this time driving the No. 44 Ford for Ferrier McClure Racing. After placing thirteenth in the lone practice session, Stevens officially started nineteenth due to qualifying being rained out, and went on to finish seventeenth due to overheating issues. He returned with the team at DuQuoin, where after starting eighteenth due to practice and qualifying being cancelled due to rain, he went on to finish in twentieth due to suffering a crash on the fourth lap of the race.

Stevens has also competed in series such as the Pro Fabrication Mid-East 604 Late Modelsand, the Renegades of Dirt Modified Tour, the Mid-East Modified Tour, the Southeast Dirt Modified Series, and the American Racer Modifieds.

== Motorsports results ==
=== ARCA Menards Series ===
(key) (Bold – Pole position awarded by qualifying time. Italics – Pole position earned by points standings or practice time. * – Most laps led.)

ARCA Menards Series results
Year	Team	No.	Make	1	2	3	4	5	6	7	8	9	10	11	12	13	14	15	16	17	18	19	20	AMSC	Pts	Ref
2018	Wayne Peterson Racing	06	Dodge	DAY	NSH	SLM	TAL	TOL	CLT	POC	MCH	MAD	GTW	CHI	IOW	ELK	POC	ISF; Wth	BLN					78th	185	
2018	Wayne Peterson Racing	06	Ford																	DSF; 14	SLM	IRP	KAN	78th	185	
2019	Wayne Peterson Racing	0	Ford	DAY	FIF	SLM	TAL	NSH	TOL	CLT	POC	MCH	MAD	GTW	CHI	ELK	IOW	POC	ISF; Wth	DSF	SLM	IRP	KAN	N/A	0	
2022	Ferrier McClure Racing	44	Ford	DAY	PHO	TAL	KAN	CLT	IOW	BLN	ELK	MOH	POC	IRP	MCH	GLN	ISF; 17	MLW	DSF; 20	KAN	BRI	SLM	TOL	64th	51	
