= Ryan Unzicker =

American racing driver

- Born: July 9, 1981 (age 45); El Paso, Illinois, U.S.

ARCA Menards Series career
- 24 races run over 13 years
- Best finish: 42nd (2022)
- First race: 2003 Allen Crowe 100 (Springfield)
- Last race: 2022 Rust-Oleum Automotive Finishes 100 (DuQuoin)
- First win: 2020 Allen Crowe 100 (Springfield)
- Last win: 2022 Rust-Oleum Automotive Finishes 100 (DuQuoin)
Wins	Top tens	Poles
2	15	1
- Statistics up to date as of September 20, 2022.

Ryan Unzicker (born July 9, 1981) is an American professional racing driver who competes in dirt track racing, as well as having competed part-time in the ARCA Menards Series, driving the No. 24 Chevrolet SS for Hendren Motorsports.

== Racing career ==
Unzicker made his debut in what was then known as the ARCA Re/Max Series in 2003 in the race at the Illinois State Fairgrounds Racetrack (Springfield). He returned to the series in 2011 and had raced every year as a dirt ringer, running the races at Springfield and the DuQuoin State Fairgrounds Racetrack until 2022. He won two races in the series, the first being at Springfield in 2020, and the second being at DuQuoin in 2022. The race at DuQuoin in 2022 was also the final race for his team, Hendren Motorsports, as car owner Bill Hendren retired after the season.

== Motorsports career results ==
=== ARCA Menards Series ===
(key) (Bold – Pole position awarded by qualifying time. Italics – Pole position earned by points standings or practice time. * – Most laps led.)

ARCA Menards Series results
Year	Team	No.	Make	1	2	3	4	5	6	7	8	9	10	11	12	13	14	15	16	17	18	19	20	21	22	AMSC	Pts	Ref
2003	Jan Gibson-Bill Hendren Racing	56	Chevy	DAY	ATL	NSH	SLM	TOL	KEN	CLT	BLN	KAN	MCH	LER	POC	POC	NSH	ISF; 6	WIN	DSF; 17	CHI					59th	515	
2003	Hendren Motorsports	66	Chevy																			SLM; 12	TAL	CLT	SBO	59th	515	
2011	Venturini Motorsports	15	Chevy	DAY	TAL	SLM	TOL	NJE	CHI	POC	MCH	WIN	BLN	IOW	IRP	POC	ISF; 20	MAD	DSF	SLM	KAN	TOL				129th	130	
2012	Hendren Motorsports	66	Chevy	DAY	MOB	SLM	TAL	TOL	ELK	POC	MCH	WIN	NJE	IOW	CHI	IRP	POC	BLN	ISF; 28	MAD	SLM	DSF; C	KAN			134th	90	
2013	Hendren Motorsports	66	Chevy	DAY	MOB	SLM	TAL	TOL	ELK	POC	MCH	ROA	WIN	CHI	NJE	POC	BLN	ISF; 11	MAD	DSF; 11	IOW	SLM	KEN	KAN		72nd	350	
2014	Hendren Motorsports	24	Chevy	DAY	MOB	SLM	TAL	TOL	NJE	POC	MCH	ELK	WIN	CHI	IRP	POC	BLN	ISF; 12	MAD	DSF; 7	SLM	KEN	KAN			48th	365	
2015	Hendren Motorsports	24	Chevy	DAY	MOB	NSH	SLM	TAL	TOL	NJE	POC	MCH	CHI	WIN	IOW	IRP	POC	BLN	ISF; 8	DSF; 9	SLM	KEN	KAN			66th	375	
2016	Hendren Motorsports	24	Toyota	DAY	NSH	SLM	TAL	TOL	NJE	POC	MCH	MAD	WIN	IOW	IRP	POC	BLN	ISF; 3	DSF; 5	SLM	CHI	KEN	KAN			55th	425	
2017	Hendren Motorsports	24	Toyota	DAY	NSH	SLM	TAL	TOL	ELK	POC	MCH	MAD	IOW	IRP	POC	WIN	ISF; 21	ROA	DSF; 4	SLM	CHI	KEN	KAN			55th	340	
2018	Hendren Motorsports	24	Toyota	DAY	NSH	SLM	TAL	TOL	CLT	POC	MCH	MAD	GTW	CHI	IOW	ELK	POC	ISF; 5	BLN	DSF; 6	SLM	IRP	KAN			51st	410	
2019	Hendren Motorsports	24	Toyota	DAY	FIF	SLM	TAL	NSH	TOL	CLT	POC	MCH	MAD	GTW	CHI	ELK	IOW	POC	ISF; 9	DSF; 10	SLM	IRP	KAN			48th	365	
2020	Hendren Motorsports	24	Chevy	DAY	PHO	TAL	POC	IRP	KEN	IOW	KAN	TOL	TOL	MCH	DAY	GTW	I44	TOL	BRI	WIN	MEM	**ISF**; 1*	KAN			49th	49	
2021	Hendren Motorsports	24	Chevy	DAY	PHO	TAL	KAN	TOL	CLT	MOH	POC	ELK	BLN	IOW	WIN	GLN	MCH	ISF; 13	MLW	DSF; 4	BRI	SLM	KAN			54th	71	
2022	Hendren Motorsports	24	Chevy	DAY	PHO	TAL	KAN	CLT	IOW	BLN	ELK	MOH	POC	IRP	MCH	GLN	ISF; 3	MLW	DSF; 1*	KAN	BRI	SLM	TOL			42nd	89	
