= 2022 ARCA Menards Series =

70th season of the ARCA Menards Series

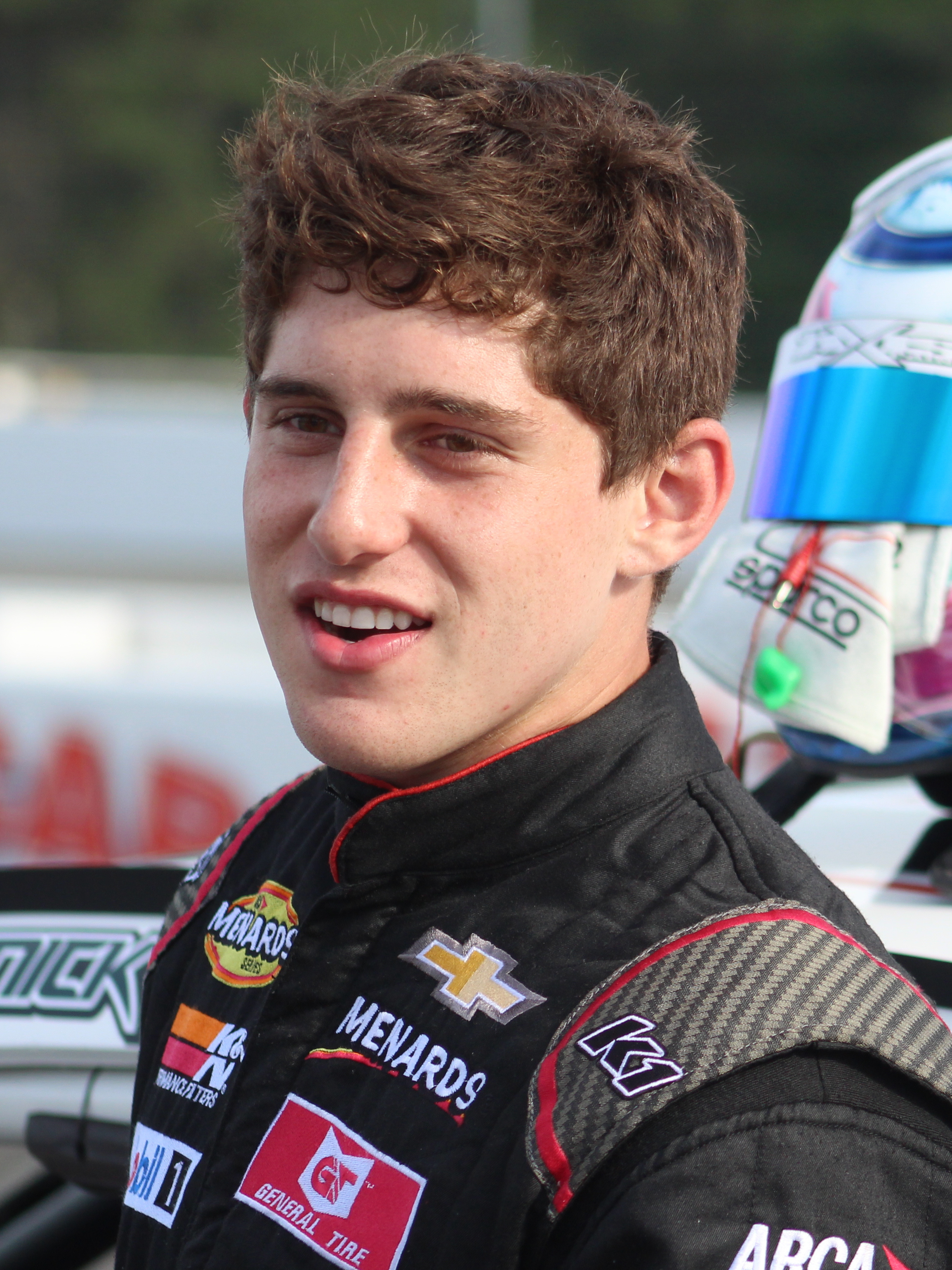
Nick Sanchez, the 2022 ARCA Menards Series champion.

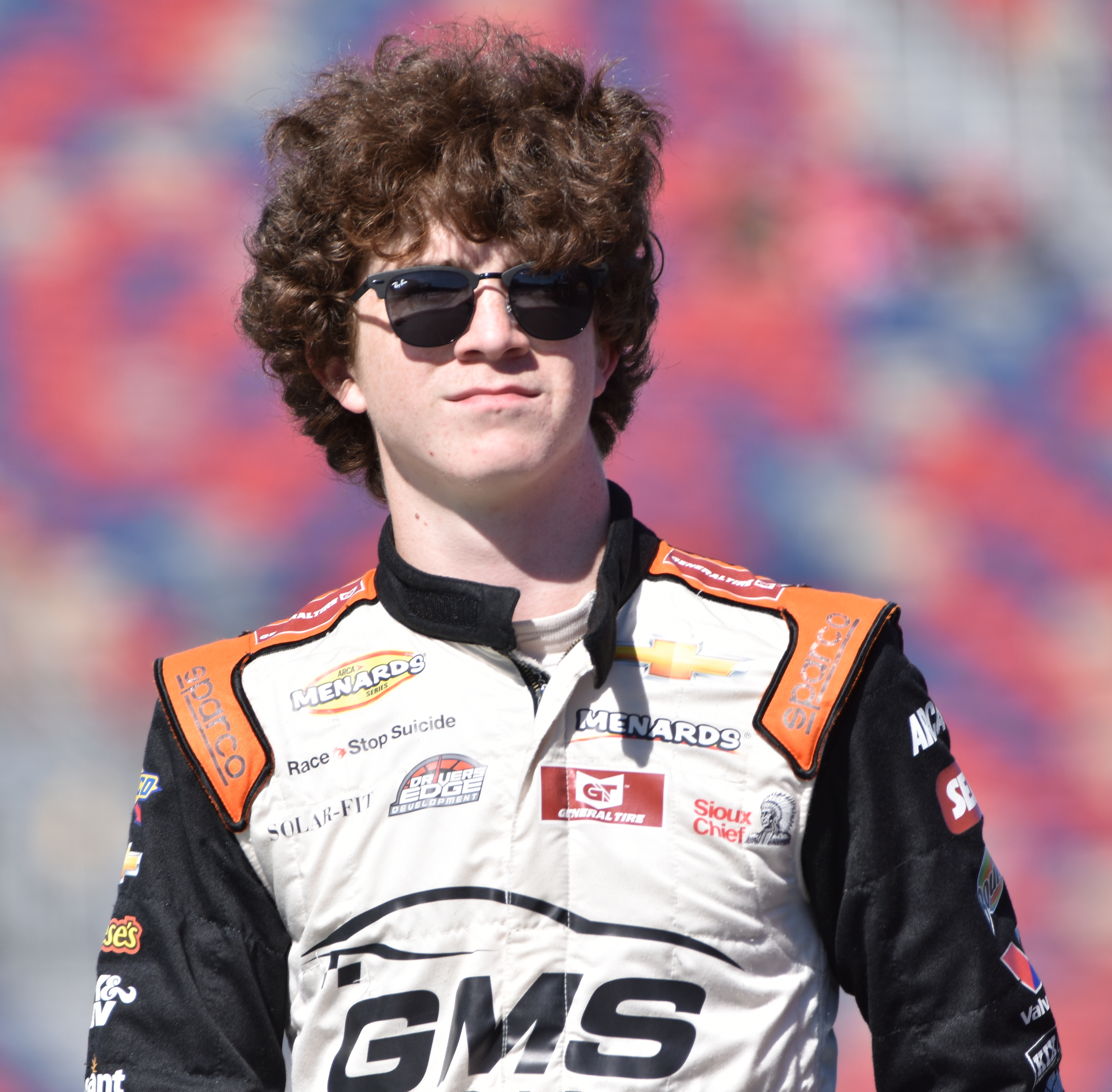
Daniel Dye finished second behind Sanchez in the championship by 14 points.

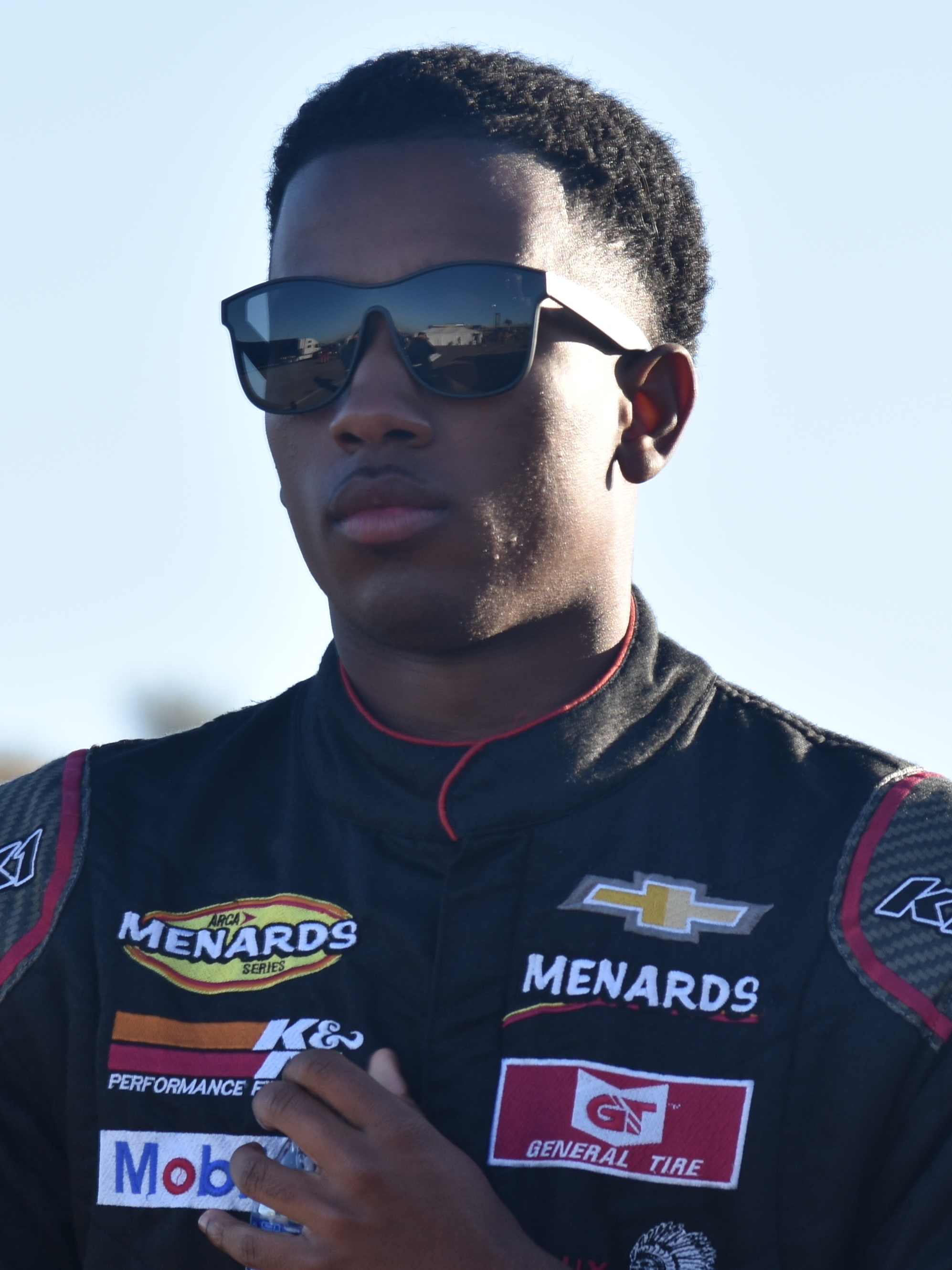
Rajah Caruth finished third in the championship.

The 2022 ARCA Menards Series was the 70th season of the ARCA Menards Series, a stock car racing series sanctioned by NASCAR in the United States. The season began at Daytona International Speedway with the Lucas Oil 200 on February 19 and ended with the Shore Lunch 200 at Toledo Speedway on October 8.

Ty Gibbs, the 2021 series champion, ran full-time for Joe Gibbs Racing in the NASCAR Xfinity Series in 2022 and therefore did not return to run full-time in the ARCA Menards Series and defend his title.

Nick Sanchez won his first championship in the series in 2022. It was the first championship for Rev Racing in the main ARCA Series and their first NASCAR/ARCA championship since winning the 2012 East Series title with Kyle Larson. Sanchez, who is Hispanic, was the first driver in NASCAR's Drive for Diversity program to win a championship while a member of the program since Larson in 2012. He is also the first driver of Hispanic ancestry to win an ARCA championship.

The race at Milwaukee featured six female drivers competing in the race (Amber Balcaen, Toni Breidinger, Mandy Chick, Stephanie Moyer, Amber Slagle, and Rita Thomason). This tied a record for the series, as six female drivers also ran the 2010 season-opener at Daytona (Jennifer Jo Cobb, Milka Duno, Jill George, Leilani Münter, Alli Owens and Danica Patrick).

== Teams and drivers ==
Note: If a driver is listed as their own crew chief for a particular race, that means that their entry in that race was a start and park.

=== Complete schedule ===
Manufacturer	Team	No.	Driver	Crew chief
Chevrolet	Brad Smith Motorsports	48	Brad Smith	Terry Strange 4 Rand Bitter 1 Colby Evans 1 Jeff Smith 9 Leo Kryger 4 Carl Brown 1
Chevrolet	GMS Racing	43	Daniel Dye (R)	Chad Bryant
Chevrolet	Rev Racing	2	Nick Sanchez	Matt Bucher
Chevrolet	Rev Racing	6	Rajah Caruth (R)	Brad Parrott 9 Brad Means 11
Toyota	Kyle Busch Motorsports	18	Drew Dollar 4	Mark McFarland
Toyota	Kyle Busch Motorsports	18	Sammy Smith (R) 16	Mark McFarland
Toyota	Venturini Motorsports	15	Parker Chase 9	Kevin Reed
Toyota	Venturini Motorsports	15	Gus Dean 2	Kevin Reed
Toyota	Venturini Motorsports	15	Conner Jones 1	Kevin Reed
Toyota	Venturini Motorsports	15	Tom Hessert III 1	Kevin Reed
Toyota	Venturini Motorsports	15	Landon Pembelton 3	Kevin Reed
Toyota	Venturini Motorsports	15	Chandler Smith 1	Kevin Reed
Toyota	Venturini Motorsports	15	Buddy Kofoid 1	Kevin Reed
Toyota	Venturini Motorsports	15	Corey Heim 1	Kevin Reed
Toyota	Venturini Motorsports	20	Corey Heim 6	Shannon Rursch 19; Billy Venturini 1
Toyota	Venturini Motorsports	20	Jesse Love (R) 14	Shannon Rursch 19; Billy Venturini 1
Toyota	Venturini Motorsports	25	Toni Breidinger (R)	Kevin Reed Jr.
Ford 9 Chevrolet 5 Toyota 6	Fast Track Racing	01	Benny Chastain 1	Tony Cosentino 1 Tim Monroe 8 Trey Galgon 1 Liz Cafferilli 1 Mike Sroufe 3 Dallas Frueh 5 Dick Doheny 1
Ford 9 Chevrolet 5 Toyota 6	Fast Track Racing	01	Tim Monroe 5	Tony Cosentino 1 Tim Monroe 8 Trey Galgon 1 Liz Cafferilli 1 Mike Sroufe 3 Dallas Frueh 5 Dick Doheny 1
Ford 9 Chevrolet 5 Toyota 6	Fast Track Racing	01	Arnout Kok 1	Tony Cosentino 1 Tim Monroe 8 Trey Galgon 1 Liz Cafferilli 1 Mike Sroufe 3 Dallas Frueh 5 Dick Doheny 1
Ford 9 Chevrolet 5 Toyota 6	Fast Track Racing	01	Dick Doheny 1	Tony Cosentino 1 Tim Monroe 8 Trey Galgon 1 Liz Cafferilli 1 Mike Sroufe 3 Dallas Frueh 5 Dick Doheny 1
Ford 9 Chevrolet 5 Toyota 6	Fast Track Racing	01	Stephanie Moyer 4	Tony Cosentino 1 Tim Monroe 8 Trey Galgon 1 Liz Cafferilli 1 Mike Sroufe 3 Dallas Frueh 5 Dick Doheny 1
Ford 9 Chevrolet 5 Toyota 6	Fast Track Racing	01	D. L. Wilson 3	Tony Cosentino 1 Tim Monroe 8 Trey Galgon 1 Liz Cafferilli 1 Mike Sroufe 3 Dallas Frueh 5 Dick Doheny 1
Ford 9 Chevrolet 5 Toyota 6	Fast Track Racing	01	Dallas Frueh 2	Tony Cosentino 1 Tim Monroe 8 Trey Galgon 1 Liz Cafferilli 1 Mike Sroufe 3 Dallas Frueh 5 Dick Doheny 1
Ford 9 Chevrolet 5 Toyota 6	Fast Track Racing	01	Zachary Tinkle 3	Tony Cosentino 1 Tim Monroe 8 Trey Galgon 1 Liz Cafferilli 1 Mike Sroufe 3 Dallas Frueh 5 Dick Doheny 1
Chevrolet 5 Toyota 12 Ford 3	Fast Track Racing	10	Jason White 1	Mike Sroufe 3 Wayne Peterson 1 Steven Barton 4 Richard Burgess 1 Dick Doheny 3 Tony Cosentino 2 Dallas Frueh 1 Tim Monroe 5
Chevrolet 5 Toyota 12 Ford 3	Fast Track Racing	10	Zachary Tinkle 3 (Note: Entries were fielded in a collaboration with Wayne Peterson Racing.)	Mike Sroufe 3 Wayne Peterson 1 Steven Barton 4 Richard Burgess 1 Dick Doheny 3 Tony Cosentino 2 Dallas Frueh 1 Tim Monroe 5
Chevrolet 5 Toyota 12 Ford 3	Fast Track Racing	10	Richard Garvie 1 (Note: Entry was fielded in a collaboration with Rugiet Racing.)	Mike Sroufe 3 Wayne Peterson 1 Steven Barton 4 Richard Burgess 1 Dick Doheny 3 Tony Cosentino 2 Dallas Frueh 1 Tim Monroe 5
Chevrolet 5 Toyota 12 Ford 3	Fast Track Racing	10	Ryan Huff 2 (Note: Entries were fielded in a collaboration with Huff Racing.)	Mike Sroufe 3 Wayne Peterson 1 Steven Barton 4 Richard Burgess 1 Dick Doheny 3 Tony Cosentino 2 Dallas Frueh 1 Tim Monroe 5
Chevrolet 5 Toyota 12 Ford 3	Fast Track Racing	10	Tanner Allen 1	Mike Sroufe 3 Wayne Peterson 1 Steven Barton 4 Richard Burgess 1 Dick Doheny 3 Tony Cosentino 2 Dallas Frueh 1 Tim Monroe 5
Chevrolet 5 Toyota 12 Ford 3	Fast Track Racing	10	Arnout Kok 1	Mike Sroufe 3 Wayne Peterson 1 Steven Barton 4 Richard Burgess 1 Dick Doheny 3 Tony Cosentino 2 Dallas Frueh 1 Tim Monroe 5
Chevrolet 5 Toyota 12 Ford 3	Fast Track Racing	10	Jon Garrett 2	Mike Sroufe 3 Wayne Peterson 1 Steven Barton 4 Richard Burgess 1 Dick Doheny 3 Tony Cosentino 2 Dallas Frueh 1 Tim Monroe 5
Chevrolet 5 Toyota 12 Ford 3	Fast Track Racing	10	Chris Martin Jr. 1	Mike Sroufe 3 Wayne Peterson 1 Steven Barton 4 Richard Burgess 1 Dick Doheny 3 Tony Cosentino 2 Dallas Frueh 1 Tim Monroe 5
Chevrolet 5 Toyota 12 Ford 3	Fast Track Racing	10	Tim Monroe 5	Mike Sroufe 3 Wayne Peterson 1 Steven Barton 4 Richard Burgess 1 Dick Doheny 3 Tony Cosentino 2 Dallas Frueh 1 Tim Monroe 5
Chevrolet 5 Toyota 12 Ford 3	Fast Track Racing	10	Joe Cooksey 1	Mike Sroufe 3 Wayne Peterson 1 Steven Barton 4 Richard Burgess 1 Dick Doheny 3 Tony Cosentino 2 Dallas Frueh 1 Tim Monroe 5
Chevrolet 5 Toyota 12 Ford 3	Fast Track Racing	10	Bryce Haugeberg 1 (Note: Entries were fielded in a collaboration with Haugeberg Racing.)	Mike Sroufe 3 Wayne Peterson 1 Steven Barton 4 Richard Burgess 1 Dick Doheny 3 Tony Cosentino 2 Dallas Frueh 1 Tim Monroe 5
Chevrolet 5 Toyota 12 Ford 3	Fast Track Racing	10	Tony Cosentino 1	Mike Sroufe 3 Wayne Peterson 1 Steven Barton 4 Richard Burgess 1 Dick Doheny 3 Tony Cosentino 2 Dallas Frueh 1 Tim Monroe 5
Toyota 9 Chevrolet 5 Ford 6	Fast Track Racing	11	Chuck Hiers 1	David Ifft 1 Mike Sroufe 9 Tony Cosentino 1 Steven Barton 3 Dick Doheny 3 Jeff Spraker 1 Andy Hillenburg 2
Toyota 9 Chevrolet 5 Ford 6	Fast Track Racing	11	Bryce Haugeberg 7	David Ifft 1 Mike Sroufe 9 Tony Cosentino 1 Steven Barton 3 Dick Doheny 3 Jeff Spraker 1 Andy Hillenburg 2
Toyota 9 Chevrolet 5 Ford 6	Fast Track Racing	11	Jon Garrett 1	David Ifft 1 Mike Sroufe 9 Tony Cosentino 1 Steven Barton 3 Dick Doheny 3 Jeff Spraker 1 Andy Hillenburg 2
Toyota 9 Chevrolet 5 Ford 6	Fast Track Racing	11	Tony Cosentino 1	David Ifft 1 Mike Sroufe 9 Tony Cosentino 1 Steven Barton 3 Dick Doheny 3 Jeff Spraker 1 Andy Hillenburg 2
Toyota 9 Chevrolet 5 Ford 6	Fast Track Racing	11	Ed Pompa 2	David Ifft 1 Mike Sroufe 9 Tony Cosentino 1 Steven Barton 3 Dick Doheny 3 Jeff Spraker 1 Andy Hillenburg 2
Toyota 9 Chevrolet 5 Ford 6	Fast Track Racing	11	Stanton Barrett 2	David Ifft 1 Mike Sroufe 9 Tony Cosentino 1 Steven Barton 3 Dick Doheny 3 Jeff Spraker 1 Andy Hillenburg 2
Toyota 9 Chevrolet 5 Ford 6	Fast Track Racing	11	Morgen Baird 1	David Ifft 1 Mike Sroufe 9 Tony Cosentino 1 Steven Barton 3 Dick Doheny 3 Jeff Spraker 1 Andy Hillenburg 2
Toyota 9 Chevrolet 5 Ford 6	Fast Track Racing	11	Ken Schrader 2	David Ifft 1 Mike Sroufe 9 Tony Cosentino 1 Steven Barton 3 Dick Doheny 3 Jeff Spraker 1 Andy Hillenburg 2
Toyota 9 Chevrolet 5 Ford 6	Fast Track Racing	11	Ryan Huff 1	David Ifft 1 Mike Sroufe 9 Tony Cosentino 1 Steven Barton 3 Dick Doheny 3 Jeff Spraker 1 Andy Hillenburg 2
Toyota 9 Chevrolet 5 Ford 6	Fast Track Racing	11	Zachary Tinkle 1	David Ifft 1 Mike Sroufe 9 Tony Cosentino 1 Steven Barton 3 Dick Doheny 3 Jeff Spraker 1 Andy Hillenburg 2
Toyota 9 Chevrolet 5 Ford 6	Fast Track Racing	11	Brandon Varney 1	David Ifft 1 Mike Sroufe 9 Tony Cosentino 1 Steven Barton 3 Dick Doheny 3 Jeff Spraker 1 Andy Hillenburg 2
Chevrolet 11 Toyota 5 Ford 4	Fast Track Racing	12	D. L. Wilson 9	Dick Doheny 9 Unknown 1 Tim Monroe 3 Robert Bruce 1 Mike Sroufe 3 Steven Barton 1 Dallas Frueh 2
Chevrolet 11 Toyota 5 Ford 4	Fast Track Racing	12	Tommy Vigh Jr. 1	Dick Doheny 9 Unknown 1 Tim Monroe 3 Robert Bruce 1 Mike Sroufe 3 Steven Barton 1 Dallas Frueh 2
Chevrolet 11 Toyota 5 Ford 4	Fast Track Racing	12	Tim Monroe 3	Dick Doheny 9 Unknown 1 Tim Monroe 3 Robert Bruce 1 Mike Sroufe 3 Steven Barton 1 Dallas Frueh 2
Chevrolet 11 Toyota 5 Ford 4	Fast Track Racing	12	Willie Mullins 1 (Note: Entry was fielded in a collaboration with Mullins Racing.)	Dick Doheny 9 Unknown 1 Tim Monroe 3 Robert Bruce 1 Mike Sroufe 3 Steven Barton 1 Dallas Frueh 2
Chevrolet 11 Toyota 5 Ford 4	Fast Track Racing	12	Tony Cosentino 1	Dick Doheny 9 Unknown 1 Tim Monroe 3 Robert Bruce 1 Mike Sroufe 3 Steven Barton 1 Dallas Frueh 2
Chevrolet 11 Toyota 5 Ford 4	Fast Track Racing	12	Ed Pompa 1	Dick Doheny 9 Unknown 1 Tim Monroe 3 Robert Bruce 1 Mike Sroufe 3 Steven Barton 1 Dallas Frueh 2
Chevrolet 11 Toyota 5 Ford 4	Fast Track Racing	12	Bryce Haugeberg 1	Dick Doheny 9 Unknown 1 Tim Monroe 3 Robert Bruce 1 Mike Sroufe 3 Steven Barton 1 Dallas Frueh 2
Chevrolet 11 Toyota 5 Ford 4	Fast Track Racing	12	Zachary Tinkle 3	Dick Doheny 9 Unknown 1 Tim Monroe 3 Robert Bruce 1 Mike Sroufe 3 Steven Barton 1 Dallas Frueh 2
Chevrolet 2 Ford 18	Greg Van Alst Motorsports	35	Greg Van Alst	Jim Long
Ford 18 Chevrolet 2	Mullins Racing 2 Clubb Racing Inc. 18	03	Brayton Laster 2 (Note: They were Mullins Racing entries using Clubb Racing Inc.'s owner points.)	Ryan Polenz 1 Brian Clubb 12; Robert Bruce 1 Chris Nichols 1 Alex Clubb 3 Ashley Clubb 2
Ford 18 Chevrolet 2	Mullins Racing 2 Clubb Racing Inc. 18	03	Alex Clubb 14	Ryan Polenz 1 Brian Clubb 12; Robert Bruce 1 Chris Nichols 1 Alex Clubb 3 Ashley Clubb 2
Ford 18 Chevrolet 2	Mullins Racing 2 Clubb Racing Inc. 18	03	Josh White 1	Ryan Polenz 1 Brian Clubb 12; Robert Bruce 1 Chris Nichols 1 Alex Clubb 3 Ashley Clubb 2
Ford 18 Chevrolet 2	Mullins Racing 2 Clubb Racing Inc. 18	03	Rita Thomason 2	Ryan Polenz 1 Brian Clubb 12; Robert Bruce 1 Chris Nichols 1 Alex Clubb 3 Ashley Clubb 2
Ford 18 Chevrolet 2	Mullins Racing 2 Clubb Racing Inc. 18	03	Casey Carden 1	Ryan Polenz 1 Brian Clubb 12; Robert Bruce 1 Chris Nichols 1 Alex Clubb 3 Ashley Clubb 2
Ford 18 Toyota 2	Rette Jones Racing	30	Amber Balcaen (R)	Mark Rette

=== Limited schedule ===
Manufacturer	Team	No.	Driver	Crew chief	Rounds
Chevrolet	1/4 Ley Racing	32	Dale Quarterley	Alex Quarterley	2
Chevrolet	66 Rhead Racing	66	Eric Rhead	Roxi Gabbard	1
Chevrolet	AM Racing	32	Max Gutiérrez (Note: Entries were fielded in a collaboration with Rette Jones Racing.)	Jamie Jones	2
Chevrolet	AM Racing	32	Austin Wayne Self	Jamie Jones	1
Chevrolet	Bill McAnally Racing	16	Austin Herzog	Charlie Wilson	1
Chevrolet	Bill McAnally Racing	19	Derek Kraus	Shane Wilson	1
Chevrolet	Bill McAnally Racing	99	Cole Moore	Mario Isola	1
Chevrolet	Bill McAnally Racing	99	Blaine Perkins (Note: Entry was fielded in a collaboration with CR7 Motorsports.)	Doug George	1
Chevrolet	BMI Racing	88	Bridget Burgess	Sarah Burgess	1
Chevrolet	Bobby Gerhart Racing	5	Dale Quarterley (Note: Entry was fielded in a collaboration with 1/4 Ley Racing.)	Bill Gerhart	1
Chevrolet	Bret Holmes Racing	23	Connor Mosack	Shane Huffman	8
Chevrolet	Bret Holmes Racing	23	Bret Holmes	Shane Huffman	2
Chevrolet	Brother-In-Law Racing	57	Bryan Dauzat	Bob Rahilly	4
Chevrolet	CR7 Motorsports	97	Jason Kitzmiller	Todd Myers	4
Chevrolet	Empire Racing	8	Sean Corr	Derek Hartnagel 1 Mike Cheek 3	4
Chevrolet	Fierce Creature Racing	27	Bobby Hillis Jr.	Ralph Byers	1
Chevrolet	Hendren Motorsports	24	Ryan Unzicker	Bill Hendren	2
Chevrolet	Kelly Kovski Racing	16	Kelly Kovski	John Hanson	2
Chevrolet	Kyle Keller Racing	70	Kyle Keller	John Keller	1
Chevrolet	Last Chance Racing	39	Andrew Tuttle	Michael Parker	1
Chevrolet	Lowden Motorsports (Note: Entry was fielded in a collaboration with Kart Idaho Racing.)	21	Chris Lowden	Tony Jackson	1
Chevrolet	Max Force Racing	9	Thomas Praytor	Mike Abram	1
Chevrolet	McGowan Motorsports	17	Josh Berry	Amber Slagle	1
Chevrolet	McGowan Motorsports	24	Amber Slagle	Sean Samuels	1
Chevrolet	Niece Motorsports	40	Matt Gould	Phil Gould	2
Chevrolet	Pedroncelli Motorsports	31	Paul Pedroncelli	Rodd Kneeland	1
Chevrolet	Spraker Racing Enterprises	63	Dave Mader III	Jeff Spraker	1
Chevrolet	Tim Goulet Enterprises	31	Rita Thomason	Tim Goulet	1
Chevrolet	Young's Motorsports	02	Leland Honeyman	Andrew Abbott	3
Chevrolet	Young's Motorsports	02	Kris Wright	Andrew Abbott	1
Chevrolet	Young's Motorsports	02	Mamba Smith	Andrew Abbott	1
Chevrolet	Young's Motorsports	02	Trey Burke	Andrew Abbott	1
Ford	Central Coast Racing	13	Todd Souza	Michael Muñoz	1
Ford	CK Motorsports	71	Chris Werth (Note: Entry was fielded in a collaboration with Visconti Motorsports.)	John Visconti	1
Ford	Coughlin Brothers Racing	72	Cody Coughlin	Kevin Hamlin	2
Ford	David Gilliland Racing	17	Taylor Gray	Chad Johnston	14
Ford	David Gilliland Racing	51	Andrés Pérez de Lara	Derek Smith	1
Ford	Huff Racing	36	Ryan Huff	Richard Burgess	2
Ford	Huff Racing	36	Tim Monroe (Note: Entry was fielded in a collaboration with Fast Track Racing.)	Richard Burgess	1
Ford	Josh Williams Motorsports with Lira Motorsports	60	Michael Lira	Tony Furr	2
Ford	Kimmel Racing	68	Will Kimmel	Tony Heaverin	1
Ford	Mystic Motorsports	07	Brian Kaltreider	Keith Tibbs	3
Ford	Naake-Klauer Motorsports	54	Joey Iest	Mike Naake	1
Ford	Sunrise Ford Racing	6	Jake Drew	Bill Sedgwick	1
Ford	Sunrise Ford Racing	9	Tanner Reif	Jeff Schrader	1
Toyota	ALH Motorsports	49	Ashton Higgins	Tony Ponkauskas	1
Toyota	Bill McAnally Racing	21	Jack Wood (Note: Entry was fielded in a collaboration with GMS Racing.)	Tom Ackerman	1
Toyota	Bill McAnally Racing	91	Colby Howard	John Camilleri	1
Toyota	Haugeberg Racing (Note: Entries were fielded in a collaboration with Cram Racing Enterprises.)	94	Bryce Haugeberg	Kevin Cram	2
Toyota	Jerry Pitts Racing	7	Takuma Koga	Jerry Pitts	1
Toyota	Joe Gibbs Racing	81	Brandon Jones	Jacob Canter 4 Jeff Meendering 1	5
Toyota	Last Chance Racing	85	Ryan Roulette	Josh Fanopoulos	1
Toyota	MacZink Racing	65	Jeffery MacZink	Jarod MacZink	2
Toyota	MAN Motorsports	95	Dylan Fetcho	Scott Fetcho	1
Toyota	MAN Motorsports	95	Tanner Arms	David Noble	2
Toyota	Nascimento Motorsports	4	Sebastian Arias	Henry Nascimento	1
Toyota	Pedroncelli Motorsports	33	P. J. Pedroncelli	Ty Joiner	1
Toyota	Phoenix Racing	1	Jake Finch	Johnny Allen	2
Toyota	Spurgeon Motorsports	86	Tim Spurgeon	Mike David	1
Toyota	TC Motorsports	91	Justin Carroll	Terry Carroll	1
Toyota	Team Chick Motorsports	74	Mandy Chick	Steve Chick	2
Toyota	Vanco Racing	66	Ron Vandermeir Jr.	Ron Vandermeir Sr.	2
Toyota	Venturini Motorsports	55	Gus Dean	Dave Leiner Jr.	3
Toyota	Venturini Motorsports	55	Jonathan Shafer	Dave Leiner Jr.	1
Toyota	Venturini Motorsports	55	Tom Hessert III	Dave Leiner Jr.	2
Toyota	Venturini Motorsports	55	John Hunter Nemechek	Dave Leiner Jr.	1
Toyota	Venturini Motorsports	55	Jake Finch (Note: Entry was fielded in a collaboration with Phoenix Racing.)	Dave Leiner Jr.	1
Toyota	Venturini Motorsports	55	Conner Jones	Dave Leiner Jr.	2
Toyota	Venturini Motorsports	55	Morgen Baird	Dave Leiner Jr.	1
Ford 4 Toyota 2 Chevrolet 3	CCM Racing 7 Bull Racing 2 (Note: It was a Bull Racing entry using CCM Racing's owner points.)	7	Eric Caudell	Jeremy Petty 3 Kyle Totman 2 Darren Mixx 1	3
Ford 4 Toyota 2 Chevrolet 3	CCM Racing 7 Bull Racing 2	7	Matt Wilson (Note: Entry was fielded in a collaboration with Fast Track Racing.)	Jeremy Petty 3 Kyle Totman 2 Darren Mixx 1	2
Ford 4 Toyota 2 Chevrolet 3	CCM Racing 7 Bull Racing 2	7	Colton Collins	Jeremy Petty 3 Kyle Totman 2 Darren Mixx 1	2
Ford 4 Toyota 2 Chevrolet 3	CCM Racing 7 Bull Racing 2	7	Ed Bull	Jeremy Petty 3 Kyle Totman 2 Darren Mixx 1	2
Chevrolet 7 Toyota 3	Cook Racing Technologies	42	Christian Rose	Sean Samuels 7 Derek Peebles 2	8
Chevrolet 7 Toyota 3	Cook Racing Technologies	42	Kris Wright	Sean Samuels 7 Derek Peebles 2	1
Chevrolet 7 Toyota 3	Cook Racing Technologies	42	Amber Slagle	Sean Samuels 7 Derek Peebles 2	1
Chevrolet 2 Ford 5 Toyota 2	Ferrier McClure Racing 6 Vanco Racing 2 (Note: It was a Vanco Racing entry using Ferrier McClure Racing's owner points.); Fast Track Racing 1 (Note: It was a Fast Track Racing entry using Ferrier McClure Racing's owner points.); GMS Racing 1 (Note: It was a GMS Racing entry using Ferrier McClure Racing's owner points.)	44	Mason Diaz	Jeff McClure	1
Chevrolet 2 Ford 5 Toyota 2	Ferrier McClure Racing 6 Vanco Racing 2 Fast Track Racing 1 GMS Racing 1	44	Thad Moffitt	Jeff McClure	1
Chevrolet 2 Ford 5 Toyota 2	Ferrier McClure Racing 6 Vanco Racing 2 Fast Track Racing 1 GMS Racing 1	44	Ron Vandermeir Jr.	Jeff McClure	3
Chevrolet 2 Ford 5 Toyota 2	Ferrier McClure Racing 6 Vanco Racing 2 Fast Track Racing 1 GMS Racing 1	44	Ed Pompa	Jeff McClure	1
Chevrolet 2 Ford 5 Toyota 2	Ferrier McClure Racing 6 Vanco Racing 2 Fast Track Racing 1 GMS Racing 1	44	Buck Stevens	Jeff McClure	2
Chevrolet 2 Ford 5 Toyota 2	Ferrier McClure Racing 6 Vanco Racing 2 Fast Track Racing 1 GMS Racing 1	44	Mike Goudie	Jeff McClure	1
Chevrolet 2 Ford 5 Toyota 2	Ferrier McClure Racing 6 Vanco Racing 2 Fast Track Racing 1 GMS Racing 1	44	Landon Huffman	Jeff McClure	1
Chevrolet 2 Ford 5 Toyota 2	Ferrier McClure Racing 6 Vanco Racing 2 Fast Track Racing 1 GMS Racing 1	44	Grant Enfinger	Jeff McClure	1
Ford 3 Toyota 2 Chevrolet 1	Jankowiak Motorsports	73	Andy Jankowiak (Note: Entries from Talladega onward are fielded in a collaboration with Marsh Racing.)	Mike Dayton	7
Ford 4 Toyota 5	Kimmel Racing	69	Scott Melton	Bill Kimmel	5
Ford 4 Toyota 5	Kimmel Racing	69	Will Kimmel	Bill Kimmel	5
Chevrolet 2 Ford 1 Toyota 1	Mullins Racing (Note: Entry at Mid-Ohio was fielded in a collaboration with Clubb Racing Inc.)	3	Willie Mullins	Robert Bruce 1 Brad Perez 1 Alex Clubb 1	2
Chevrolet 2 Ford 1 Toyota 1	Mullins Racing	3	Casey Carden	Robert Bruce 1 Brad Perez 1 Alex Clubb 1	1
Chevrolet 2 Ford 1 Toyota 1	Mullins Racing	3	Mason Diaz	Robert Bruce 1 Brad Perez 1 Alex Clubb 1	1
Toyota 4 Ford 1 Chevrolet 4	Richmond Motorsports 8 Vanco Racing 1 (Note: It was a Vanco Racing entry using Richmond Motorsports' owner points.)	27	Tim Richmond	Darrell Phillips 6 Ron Vandermeir Sr. 1 Donald Liepold 1	4
Toyota 4 Ford 1 Chevrolet 4	Richmond Motorsports 8 Vanco Racing 1	27	Ron Vandermeir Jr.	Darrell Phillips 6 Ron Vandermeir Sr. 1 Donald Liepold 1	1
Toyota 4 Ford 1 Chevrolet 4	Richmond Motorsports 8 Vanco Racing 1	27	Dallas Frueh	Darrell Phillips 6 Ron Vandermeir Sr. 1 Donald Liepold 1	2
Toyota 4 Ford 1 Chevrolet 4	Richmond Motorsports 8 Vanco Racing 1	27	Con Nicolopoulos	Darrell Phillips 6 Ron Vandermeir Sr. 1 Donald Liepold 1	1
Ford 2 Toyota 2	Wayne Peterson Racing	0	Con Nicolopoulos	Michael Peterson	1
Ford 2 Toyota 2	Wayne Peterson Racing	0	A. J. Moyer	Dave Smith	1
Ford 2 Toyota 2	Wayne Peterson Racing	0	Nate Moeller	Nate Moeller	2
Chevrolet 7 Toyota 6 Ford 2	Wayne Peterson Racing 15; Richmond Motorsports 1 (Note: It was a Richmond Motorsports entry using Wayne Peterson Racing's owner points.)	06	Zachary Tinkle	Wayne Peterson 4 Michael Peterson 4 Nate Moeller 6 Tim Goulet 1	9
Chevrolet 7 Toyota 6 Ford 2	Wayne Peterson Racing 15; Richmond Motorsports 1	06	Rita Thomason (Note: Entry was fielded in a collaboration with Mike Harmon Racing and Tim Goulet Enterprises.)	Wayne Peterson 4 Michael Peterson 4 Nate Moeller 6 Tim Goulet 1	1
Chevrolet 7 Toyota 6 Ford 2	Wayne Peterson Racing 15; Richmond Motorsports 1	06	Tim Richmond	Wayne Peterson 4 Michael Peterson 4 Nate Moeller 6 Tim Goulet 1	1
Chevrolet 7 Toyota 6 Ford 2	Wayne Peterson Racing 15; Richmond Motorsports 1	06	Nate Moeller	Wayne Peterson 4 Michael Peterson 4 Nate Moeller 6 Tim Goulet 1	2
Chevrolet 7 Toyota 6 Ford 2	Wayne Peterson Racing 15; Richmond Motorsports 1	06	Kevin Hinckle	Wayne Peterson 4 Michael Peterson 4 Nate Moeller 6 Tim Goulet 1	1
Chevrolet 7 Toyota 6 Ford 2	Wayne Peterson Racing 15; Richmond Motorsports 1	06	A. J. Moyer	Wayne Peterson 4 Michael Peterson 4 Nate Moeller 6 Tim Goulet 1	2

=== Changes ===
==== Teams ====
- On August 30, 2021, it was announced that Rev Racing would be expanding to two full-time cars in the main ARCA Menards Series with Rajah Caruth, who drove full-time for the team in the East Series in 2021, driving the second car. Nick Sanchez will return to the team full-time in the other car. (As a result, the team will not field a full-time car in the East Series in 2022.)
- Miles Thomas Motorsports will debut in 2022. The team will compete full-time or part-time in both the ARCA Menards Series and Xfinity Series with Jason Miles, who is also a co-owner of the team. Miles competed part-time in ARCA for Fast Track Racing in 2019 and 2021. Ford will be their manufacturer. The team has yet to announce their car number, sponsors, and crew chief.
- On October 29, 2021, GMS Racing announced that Daniel Dye, who drove their No. 21 car part-time in the main ARCA Series and the East Series in 2021, would run full-time in the same car in 2022 in the main ARCA Series. It will be the first time since 2015 that GMS has fielded a full-time car in the main ARCA Series. On December 10, Dye announced that the car number would change to the No. 43, which was his late model racing number, a number he used in the East Series with Ben Kennedy Racing, as well as a number that GMS will use in the Cup Series in 2022 as a result of the team purchasing the majority of Richard Petty Motorsports to become Petty GMS Motorsports (although this ARCA car will remain a GMS car and not become a Petty GMS car).
- On March 22, 2022, Team Stange Racing announced that they would be returning to ARCA with their No. 46 car, which was last fielded in the 2016 season-opener at Daytona with Frank Kimmel running his second-to-last ARCA race. Formula 2 and Formula 3 driver Matteo Nannini will make his stock car debut in that car in the race at Mid-Ohio. The team did not end up entering the race at Mid-Ohio.
- On March 25, 2022, Rugiet Racing, sponsored by men's performance company Rugiet Health, announced that they would make their debut in the series with Richard Garvie driving the No. 84 car at Talladega. However, Rugiet would end up partnering with Fast Track Racing (a team Garvie has previously driven for) to jointly field the No. 10 car in that race with Garvie driving. On April 29, the team revealed that they would also attempt the race at Charlotte. The team did not end up entering the race at Charlotte.
- On August 4, 2022, Tim Goulet Enterprises announced that they would make their debut in the series with Rita Thomason driving the No. 31 car at Watkins Glen. However, Tim Goulet would end up partnering with Wayne Peterson Racing to jointly field the No. 06 car in that race with Thomason driving. On the Milwaukee entry list, the team revealed that they would also attempt that race.

==== Drivers ====
- With Ty Gibbs all but confirmed to be moving up to the Xfinity Series full-time in 2022, Sammy Smith, the 2021 ARCA Menards Series East champion, is likely to return to Joe Gibbs Racing to drive the No. 18 car in most of the races in the main ARCA Series in 2022. However, because he will not turn 18 (the minimum age to race at all tracks) until June 4, 2022, he will need to miss all of the races at the larger tracks (such as Daytona and Talladega) that happen before then. Smith confirmed to Frontstretch that this was likely the plan, and that Mark McFarland would return as his crew chief in 2022.
- On October 29, 2021, GMS Racing announced that Daniel Dye, who drove their No. 21 car part-time in the main ARCA Series and the East Series in 2021, would run full-time in the same car (later renumbered to the No. 43) in 2022 in the main ARCA Series. Dye will turn 18 on December 4, 2021, after which he will be eligible to run all the races. On April 27, 2022, ARCA indefinitely suspended Dye due to his arrest on a felony battery charge in Volusia County, Florida. On May 13, ARCA announced that Dye would be reinstated after his charges were reduced by the Florida state attorney's office. Dye did not end up missing any races as none had occurred during the time he was suspended.
- On January 3, 2022, Rette Jones Racing announced that Amber Balcaen would drive their No. 30 car full-time in 2022.
- On January 3, 2022, Venturini Motorsports announced that Corey Heim would return to the No. 20 car for 6 events, while Jesse Love will run for ROTY by running 14 events.
- On January 11, 2022, it was announced that Connor Mosack would join Bret Holmes Racing to drive their No. 23 car in 10 races.
- On January 13, 2022, Venturini Motorsports announced that Toni Breidinger would drive their No. 25 car full-time in 2022. She previously drove part-time in the series in 2018 for Venturini and in 2021 for Venturini as well as Young's Motorsports.
- On January 18, 2022, it was announced that Brayton Laster would attempt the race at Daytona in the No. 03 car for Mullins Racing in a collaboration with Clubb Racing Inc.
- On February 8, 2022, it was revealed that Tim Richmond would return to driving part-time for his team, Richmond Motorsports, in 2022 after having suffered an injury in the race at Michigan in 2021. On the Berlin entry list, it was revealed that Dallas Frueh would make his debut in Richmond's No. 27 Chevy.
- On February 15, 2022, Max Gutiérrez would drive for AM Racing, at Daytona with the Rette Jones Racing banner and using the No. 32. Gutiérrez would drive that car again at Talladega.
- On February 15, 2022, Bryce Haugeberg would drive for his own team, Haugeberg Racing, at Daytona in a partnership with Cram Racing Enterprises and using CRE's number, the No. 94. Haugeberg would drive that car again at Talladega and would partner with Fast Track Racing to jointly field the No. 11 car at Phoenix and Kansas in May with him driving it.
- On February 15, 2022, Brian Kaltreider and his team Mystic Motorsports would return to ARCA after 3 years away after the 2018 fire shop mishap.
- On March 6, 2022, it was announced that Ryan Roulette would attempt 5 races in the No. 85 car for Last Chance Racing.
- On April 1, 2022, it was revealed that Christian Rose would attempt 9 races in the main ARCA series, 5 races in the East Series, and 3 races in the West Series for Cook Racing Technologies.
- On the Talladega entry list, Thad Moffitt would drive the No. 44 for Jeff McClure. It was a Ford on the entry list, but due to an Instagram post, it would be a Chevy, most likely because he drove a Chevy while competing for Reaume Brothers Racing in the Truck Series.
- On April 20, 2022, it was revealed that A. J. Moyer would attempt 3 races (Talladega, Salem and Toledo) with Wayne Peterson Racing. He drove the No. 0 at Talladega and will most likely drive the No. 06 at Salem and Toledo.
- On April 26, 2022, Venturini Motorsports announced that Jake Finch would attempt the No. 55 at Pocono, in addition to his lone East Series race for the team at Dover.
- On the Spring Kansas entry list, it was revealed that Ron Vandermeir Jr. will attempt the No. 27. The car was a Ford and it was his own team's entry instead of Richmond's. He also drove the No. 44 at Iowa with his own team instead of Ferrier's.
- On May 25, 2022, it was announced that Brandon Jones would return to the series to run five races (Charlotte, Iowa, Pocono, Watkins Glen and Bristol) in the No. 81 car for Joe Gibbs Racing. The races at Iowa and Bristol are also combination races with the ARCA Menards Series East. Although JGR sold their ARCA team to Kyle Busch Motorsports before the start of the 2022 season, this entry will be a JGR car and not a KBM car.
- On the Charlotte entry list, it was revealed that Matt Wilson would make his debut for CCM Racing. He previously made his debut in the No. 10 for Fast Track Racing at Nashville in the ARCA East Series.
- On the Elko entry list, it was revealed that Colton Collins would make his debut in the No. 7 car for CCM Racing.
- On June 30, 2022, it was announced that Joe Cooksey would return to the series for the first time since 2018 to run the race at DuQuoin for Fast Track Racing. Cooksey stated that it could end up being his final ARCA start. Ken Schrader will also return to the series to run the race at DuQuoin for Fast Track as he did in 2021. Schrader drove the 11 at both dirt races, and Cooksey secured a top-10 finish at DuQuoin.
- On the Mid-Ohio entry list, it was revealed that Ed Bull (who failed to start in last year's Watkins Glen race) would attempt to run the race in the CCM Racing No. 7 car in a partnership with his own team.
- On the Mid-Ohio entry list, it was revealed that Casey Carden would attempt to run the race in the Mullins Racing No. 3 car in a partnership with Alex Clubb's team.
- On July 21, 2022, it was announced that Mamba Smith, who has been a late model racing driver, a pit crew and PR member for various NASCAR teams and currently works for NASCAR.com, would make his ARCA debut in the race at IRP in the No. 02 for Young's Motorsports.
- On the IRP entry list, it was revealed that Mandy Chick, who is the daughter of Steve Chick, would attempt to run the race in her own team in the No. 74 car.
- On the IRP entry list, it was revealed that Dylan Fetcho would attempt to run the race in the No. 95 for MAN Motorsports, which is the team that previously made their debut with Tanner Arms at Nashville in the ARCA East Series.
- On the Michigan entry list, it was revealed that Cody Coughlin would make his first ever ARCA sanctioned start since 2015, with his own team Coughlin Brothers Racing driving the No. 72.
- On the Watkins Glen entry list, it was revealed that Chris Werth would attempt to run the race in the No. 71 for New York-based team CK Motorsports.
- On the Milwaukee entry list, it was revealed that Amber Slagle would attempt to run the race in a second car for Cook Racing Technologies, the No. 24 (reverse of No. 42).
- On the Milwaukee entry list, it was revealed that Matt Gould, who is the son of Niece Motorsports team owner Phil Gould, would attempt to run the race in his No. 40 car.

==== Crew chiefs ====
- On January 11, 2022, it was announced that Brad Parrott would be the crew chief for Rajah Caruth's No. 6 car for Rev Racing in 2022. Glenn Parker was Caruth's crew chief in 2021 when he ran part-time in the main ARCA Series and full-time in the East Series. His Rev Racing teammate Nick Sanchez also got a new crew chief for 2022, as Matt Bucher replaced Steve Plattenberger.
- Kevin Reed Jr. replaced Billy Venturini as a full-time crew chief for Venturini Motorsports in 2022. He previously had been a crew chief if the team fielded a part-time car or an interim crew chief on one of the team's full-time cars if needed. He is the son of Kevin Reed, another full-time crew chief for VMS. Reed Sr. is crew chiefing the No. 15 car (driven by multiple drivers) and Reed Jr. is crew chiefing the No. 25 car (driven by Toni Breidinger). This move allowed Billy Venturini to focus solely on the ownership side of the team.

==== Interim crew chiefs ====
- On May 14, 2022, Shannon Rursch, the crew chief of the No. 20 Venturini Motorsports car, missed the race at Kansas that day in order to attend his daughter's college graduation ceremony as was stated on the Fox TV broadcast. VMS team owner and former crew chief Billy Venturini filled in as the interim crew chief for the No. 20 car, driven by Corey Heim, in that race.

==== Manufacturers ====
- On October 7, 2021, an article on Frontstretch revealed that Rev Racing would receive manufacturer support from Chevy in 2022, which they did not have in 2021 despite being a Chevy team.
- 2022 marked the first year that the Ford Mustang was an eligible body style, as the Ford Fusion had long since been discontinued. However, the body was not widely adopted by Ford teams until 2023.

== Schedule ==
Some tracks announced their 2022 race dates before the release of the entire schedule on October 29, 2021.

Notes:

- The race at Phoenix in March was a combination race with the ARCA Menards Series West (highlighted in gold).
- The races at Iowa, Milwaukee and Bristol are combination races with the ARCA Menards Series East (highlighted in silver).

No	Race title	Track	Date
1	Lucas Oil 200	Daytona International Speedway, Daytona Beach, Florida	February 19
2	General Tire 150	Phoenix Raceway, Avondale, Arizona	March 11
3	General Tire 200	Talladega Superspeedway, Lincoln, Alabama	April 23
4	Dutch Boy 150	Kansas Speedway, Kansas City, Kansas	May 14
5	General Tire 150	Charlotte Motor Speedway, Concord, North Carolina	May 27
6	Calypso Lemonade 150	Iowa Speedway, Newton, Iowa	June 11
7	Zinsser SmartCoat 200	Berlin Raceway, Marne, Michigan	June 18
8	Menards 250	Elko Speedway, Elko New Market, Minnesota	June 25
9	Dawn 150	Mid-Ohio Sports Car Course, Lexington, Ohio	July 8
10	General Tire Delivers 200	Pocono Raceway, Long Pond, Pennsylvania	July 22
11	Reese's 200	Lucas Oil Indianapolis Raceway Park, Brownsburg, Indiana	July 29
12	Henry Ford Health 200	Michigan International Speedway, Brooklyn, Michigan	August 6
13	General Tire Delivers 100	Watkins Glen International, Watkins Glen, New York	August 19
14	Atlas 100	Illinois State Fairgrounds Racetrack, Springfield, Illinois	August 21
15	Sprecher 150	Milwaukee Mile, West Allis, Wisconsin	August 28
16	Rust-Oleum Automotive Finishes 100	DuQuoin State Fairgrounds Racetrack, Du Quoin, Illinois	September 5
17	Kansas Lottery 150	Kansas Speedway, Kansas City, Kansas	September 11
18	Sioux Chief Showdown 200	Bristol Motor Speedway, Bristol, Tennessee	September 15
19	Herr's Snacks 200	Salem Speedway, Salem, Indiana	October 1
20	Shore Lunch 200	Toledo Speedway, Toledo, Ohio	October 8

=== Schedule changes ===
- Lucas Oil Indianapolis Raceway Park, which has had a race on the schedule each year since 2011 except for 2013 and 2021, returns to the schedule, replacing Winchester Speedway. It will have an ARCA Menards Series race (and a Truck Series race) on July 29.
- The races at Iowa Speedway, Berlin Raceway and Elko Speedway all move from July to June.
- The races at Mid-Ohio Sports Car Course and Pocono Raceway both move from June to July.
- The fall race at Kansas Speedway, which was previously the season-finale, moves from October to September along with the weekend's Cup Series race.
- The race at Toledo Speedway, which was previously in May, will now be the season-finale in October.

=== Broadcasting ===
The TV lineup is similar to what it looked like in 2021, with FS1 airing almost all of the races that occur at tracks that the NASCAR Cup, Xfinity and Truck Series go to and have races at on the same weekend as the ARCA Menards Series and FS1 is at the track to broadcast at least one of those series. The rest of the races are aired on MAVTV. The only races that FS1 is not broadcasting where the Cup, Xfinity and/or Truck Series does have a race at on the same weekend are Phoenix and Kansas, which are both on MAVTV.

NBC Sports TrackPass, which previously had the streaming rights to all of the MAVTV races, lost the rights to FloRacing. The Fox Sports App will continue to stream all of the races on FS1.

== Results and standings ==
=== Race results ===
No.	Race	Pole position	Most laps led	Winning driver	Manufacturer	No.	Winning team	Report
1	Lucas Oil 200	Corey Heim	Corey Heim	Corey Heim	Toyota	20	Venturini Motorsports	Report
2	General Tire 150	Sammy Smith	Sammy Smith	Taylor Gray	Ford	17	David Gilliland Racing	Report
3	General Tire 200	Drew Dollar	Drew Dollar	Nick Sanchez	Chevrolet	2	Rev Racing	Report
4	Dutch Boy 150	Corey Heim	Corey Heim	Nick Sanchez	Chevrolet	2	Rev Racing	Report
5	General Tire 150	Brandon Jones	Brandon Jones	Brandon Jones	Toyota	81	Joe Gibbs Racing	Report
6	Calypso Lemonade 150	Jesse Love	Sammy Smith	Brandon Jones	Toyota	81	Joe Gibbs Racing	Report
7	Zinsser SmartCoat 200	Daniel Dye	Daniel Dye	Sammy Smith	Toyota	18	Kyle Busch Motorsports	Report
8	Menards 250	Sammy Smith	Sammy Smith	Sammy Smith	Toyota	18	Kyle Busch Motorsports	Report
9	Dawn 150	John Hunter Nemechek	John Hunter Nemechek	Taylor Gray	Ford	17	David Gilliland Racing	Report
10	General Tire Delivers 200	Sammy Smith	Taylor Gray	Taylor Gray	Ford	17	David Gilliland Racing	Report
11	Reese's 200	Sammy Smith	Chandler Smith	Chandler Smith	Toyota	15	Venturini Motorsports	Report
12	Henry Ford Health 200	Corey Heim	Nick Sanchez	Nick Sanchez	Chevrolet	2	Rev Racing	Report
13	General Tire Delivers 100	Sammy Smith	Sammy Smith	Brandon Jones	Toyota	81	Joe Gibbs Racing	Report
14	Atlas 100	Jesse Love	Jesse Love	Jesse Love	Toyota	20	Venturini Motorsports	Report
15	Sprecher 150	Sammy Smith	Sammy Smith	Sammy Smith	Toyota	18	Kyle Busch Motorsports	Report
16	Rust-Oleum Automotive Finishes 100	Jesse Love	Ryan Unzicker	Ryan Unzicker	Chevrolet	24	Hendren Motorsports	Report
17	Kansas Lottery 150	Corey Heim	Corey Heim	Corey Heim	Toyota	20	Venturini Motorsports	Report
18	Bush's Beans 200	Sammy Smith	Sammy Smith	Sammy Smith	Toyota	18	Kyle Busch Motorsports	Report
19	Herr's Snacks 200	Sammy Smith	Sammy Smith	Sammy Smith	Toyota	18	Kyle Busch Motorsports	Report
20	Shore Lunch 200	Jesse Love	Jesse Love	Sammy Smith	Toyota	18	Kyle Busch Motorsports	Report

=== Drivers' championship ===
Notes:

- The pole winner also receives one bonus point, similar to the previous ARCA points system used until 2019 and unlike NASCAR.
- Additionally, after groups of five races of the season, drivers that compete in all five races receive fifty additional points. These points bonuses will be given after the races at Charlotte, Pocono, Milwaukee and Toledo.
  - Rajah Caruth, Nick Sanchez, Daniel Dye, Toni Breidinger, Amber Balcaen, Greg Van Alst, Zachary Tinkle and Brad Smith received fifty bonus points for having competed in the first five races of the season (Daytona, Phoenix, Talladega, Kansas in May, and Charlotte). Caruth, Sanchez, Dye, Breidinger, Balcaen, Van Alst, Brad Smith, Sammy Smith, Taylor Gray, Jesse Love and D. L. Wilson received the fifty bonus points for having competed in the next five races (Iowa, Berlin, Elko, Mid-Ohio and Pocono). Caruth, Sanchez, Dye, Van Alst, Breidinger, Balcaen, Brad Smith, Sammy Smith, Tinkle and Tim Monroe received the fifty bonus points after having competed the next five races (Indianapolis, Michigan, Watkins Glen, Springfield and Milwaukee). Caruth, Sanchez, Dye, Van Alst, Breidinger, Balcaen, Brad Smith, Sammy Smith, Tinkle, Monroe and Alex Clubb received the fifty bonus points after competing in the last five races (DuQuoin, Kansas, Bristol, Salem and Toledo).

(key) Bold – Pole position awarded by time. Italics – Pole position set by final practice results or rainout. * – Most laps led. ** – All laps led.

Pos	Driver	DAY	PHO	TAL	KAN	CLT	IOW	BER	ELK	MOH	POC	IRP	MCH	GLN	ISF	MLW	DSF	KAN	BRI	SLM	TOL	Points
1	Nick Sanchez	20	7	1	1	8	7	6	11	11	2	7	1*	2	5	5	5	2	12	6	6	970
2	Daniel Dye **(R)**	3	2	17	3	6	17	**7***	5	8	5	4	3	4	7	3	4	4	5	3	18	956
3	Rajah Caruth **(R)**	11	4	6	2	3	12	5	7	9	4	8	6	11	6	4	17	12	4	15	5	932
4	Sammy Smith **(R)**		**3***				2*	1	**1***	3	**12**	**2**	4	**5***	4	**1***	3	3	**1***	**1****	1	851
5	Greg Van Alst	22	36	11	7	5	8	8	8	12	15	10	9	13	15	9	6	17	14	7	9	841
6	Toni Breidinger **(R)**	9	15	24	10	11	11	9	12	13	10	17	11	14	18	12	13	9	16	8	14	824
7	Amber Balcaen **(R)**	16	30	12	9	7	10	11	17	15	21	21	18	19	14	14	14	8	31	9	10	774
8	Brad Smith	28	34	22	18	14	15	10	16	22	17	16	16	24	21	21	11	13	24	14	15	709
9	Zachary Tinkle	24	29	20	11	17	22	13	18		26	15	21	23	12	20	18	20	20	17	21	619
10	Taylor Gray		1				18	4	4	1	1*	3		8	8	2	12		3	5	4	606
11	Jesse Love **(R)**		6				**13**	3	2	5	13	6		3	1**	7	2		10	2	**2***	603
12	Tim Monroe		33	33		23		14				24	19	25	19	26	7	19	30	18	22	404
13	Alex Clubb		21		17		16		15		28	23	17		11	28	21	18	29	12	17	393
14	D. L. Wilson	23	24	16	12		19	15	19	21	25	19	13						18			354
15	Parker Chase	2	20	9		15				2	18			6				6	6			313
16	Connor Mosack		10		5	4	3				6	5		16					9			296
17	Bryce Haugeberg	33	28	18	13		14		14		16	13			10	19				10		296
18	Corey Heim	**1***		3	**16***	2							**2**				9	**1***				294
19	Brandon Jones					**1***	1				3			1					2			227
20	Andy Jankowiak	6		13		18					23			22					8		11	207
21	Ron Vandermeir Jr.				8		9		10							13		21	11			192
22	Christian Rose	31	27			16					24	20				15		7	22			190
23	Ryan Huff	10		8	14	13												5				170
24	Will Kimmel	35			6	19									16		19			4		165
25	Gus Dean	5		5	4								5									157
26	Tim Richmond	18		29		26	23									17				QL		131
27	Scott Melton	30		28							11		15					11				125
28	Conner Jones						5							10					27	13		122
29	Landon Pembelton								3							6					7	116
30	Drew Dollar	19		**7***	15	24																114
31	Tom Hessert III							2	6			11										113
32	Ed Pompa							17			20			17						11		111
33	Sean Corr	4		31		10					22											110
34	Jason Kitzmiller	34		14							9		12									107
35	Jake Finch										7					8			13			104
36	Dale Quarterley	12								10				9								101
37	Rita Thomason							12		19				20		25						100
38	Dallas Frueh							16	20				20		20							100
39	Willie Mullins	14		15					9													94
40	Nate Moeller															27	15			19	23	92
41	Stephanie Moyer						21				19					24			21			91
42	Ryan Unzicker														3		1*					89
43	Leland Honeyman						6									11			28			87
44	Jon Garrett			21							14							10				87
45	Tony Cosentino					9				20											20	83
46	Bret Holmes			2									7									80
47	Kris Wright									6	8											75
48	Bryan Dauzat	26		30		20					27											73
49	Matt Gould															10					8	70
50	A. J. Moyer			23															23		16	70
51	Stanton Barrett									7				12								69
52	Cody Coughlin												8					15				66
53	Ken Schrader														9		16					63
54	Kelly Kovski														15		10					63
55	Matt Wilson				Wth	12												14				62
56	Colton Collins								13			14										61
57	Amber Slagle															18					13	57
58	Mason Diaz	7																	25			56
59	Arnout Kok				19					14												55
60	Jeffery MacZink												14								19	55
61	Morgen Baird												10								24	54
62	Mandy Chick											18				16						54
63	Ed Bull									16				21								51
64	Buck Stevens														17		20					51
65	Casey Carden									23				15								50
66	Michael Lira	21																	17			50
67	Brayton Laster	13		26																		49
68	Chandler Smith											1*										48
69	Eric Caudell	36		27												22						47
70	Max Gutiérrez	32		10																		46
71	Buddy Kofoid														2							42
72	John Hunter Nemechek									**4***												42
73	Grant Enfinger																				3	41
74	Thad Moffitt			4																		40
75	Jonathan Shafer						4															40
76	Jake Drew		5																			39
77	Austin Wayne Self													7								37
78	Andrés Pérez de Lara																		7			37
79	Brian Kaltreider	27	37	32																		36
80	Josh Berry		8																			36
81	Dave Mader III	8		Wth																		36
82	Joe Cooksey																8					36
83	Derek Kraus		9																			35
84	Mamba Smith											9										35
85	Con Nicolopoulos	29								24												35
86	Cole Moore		11																			33
87	Brandon Varney																				11	33
88	Todd Souza		12																			32
89	Dylan Fetcho											12										32
90	Joey Iest		13																			31
91	Austin Herzog		14																			30
92	Chuck Hiers	15																				29
93	Tanner Arms																		15			29
94	Tanner Reif		16																			28
95	Kevin Hinckle																	16				28
96	Landon Huffman																			16		28
97	Jason White	17																				27
98	Colby Howard									17												27
99	P. J. Pedroncelli		17																			27
100	Takuma Koga		18																			26
101	Blaine Perkins									18												26
102	Chris Werth													18								26
103	Tim Spurgeon		19																			25
104	Thomas Praytor			19																		25
105	Ashton Higgins																		19			25
106	Tanner Allen						20															24
107	Tommy Vigh Jr.					21																23
108	Ryan Roulette		22																			22
109	Dick Doheny					22																22
110	Chris Martin Jr.											22										22
111	Bridget Burgess		23																			21
112	Mike Goudie															23						21
113	Benny Chastain	25																				19
114	Sebastian Arias		25																			19
115	Richard Garvie			25																		19
116	Josh White					25																19
117	Jack Wood									25												19
118	Bobby Hillis Jr.		26																			18
119	Justin Carroll																		26			18
120	Chris Lowden		31																			13
121	Kyle Keller		32																			12
122	Andrew Tuttle		35																			9
123	Paul Pedroncelli		38																			6
124	Eric Rhead		39																			5
	Chuck Walker	Wth																				
	Nick Joanides		Wth																			

== See also ==
- 2022 NASCAR Cup Series
- 2022 NASCAR Xfinity Series
- 2022 NASCAR Camping World Truck Series
- 2022 ARCA Menards Series East
- 2022 ARCA Menards Series West
- 2022 NASCAR Whelen Modified Tour
- 2022 NASCAR Pinty's Series
- 2022 NASCAR Mexico Series
- 2022 NASCAR Whelen Euro Series
- 2022 SRX Series
- 2022 CARS Tour
- 2022 SMART Modified Tour
