= 2022 Atlas 100 =

14th race of the 2022 ARCA Menards Series

Race details
- Race 14 of 20 of the 2022 ARCA Menards Series
- Date: August 21, 2022
- Official name: 40th Annual Atlas 100
- Location: Illinois State Fairgrounds Racetrack, Springfield, Illinois
- Course: Permanent racing facility
- Course length: 1 miles (1.6 km)
- Distance: 74 laps, 74 mi (119.066 km)
- Scheduled distance: 100 laps, 100 mi (160 km)
- Average speed: 67.454 mph (108.557 km/h)

Pole position
| Driver | Jesse Love | Venturini Motorsports |
- Grid positions set by competition-based formula

Most laps led
| Driver | Jesse Love | Venturini Motorsports |
- Laps: 74

Winner
| No. 20 | Jesse Love | Venturini Motorsports |

Television in the United States
- Network: MAVTV
- Announcers: Jim Tretow

Radio in the United States
- Radio: ARCA Racing Network

The 2022 Atlas 100 was the 14th stock car race of the 2022 ARCA Menards Series season, and the 40th iteration of the event. The race was held on Sunday, August 21, 2022, in Springfield, Illinois at the Illinois State Fairgrounds Racetrack, a 1-mile (1.6 km) permanent oval-shaped dirt track. The race was decreased from 100 laps to 73 laps, due to time constraints with the Disturbed concert. In a dominating fashion, Jesse Love, driving for Venturini Motorsports, would lead every single lap, and earn his second career ARCA Menards Series win, and his first of the season. To fill out the podium, Buddy Kofoid, driving for Venturini Motorsports, and Ryan Unzicker, driving for Hendren Motorsports, would finish 2nd and 3rd, respectively.

The race was marred following a crash on the last lap. On the final lap, teammates Jesse Love and Buddy Kofoid were battling for the lead. On the straightaway, Bryce Haugeberg had hit the outside wall, causing him to stall on the track. The leaders entered the straightway. Love was able to avoid Haugeberg by moving to the inside of the track. Kofoid did not see Haugeberg because of a windshield glare and a dust pickup. Kofoid slammed into the back of Haugeberg's car, causing it to flip on its side. Both drivers were able to get out under their own power. Kofoid was credited with a 2nd-place finish, and Haugeberg was credited with a 10th-place finish.

== Background ==
Illinois State Fairgrounds Racetrack is a one mile long clay oval motor racetrack on the Illinois State Fairgrounds in Springfield, the state capital. It is frequently nicknamed The Springfield Mile. Constructed in the late 19th century and reconstructed in 1927, the track has hosted competitive auto racing since 1910, making it one of the oldest speedways in the United States. The original mile track utilized the current frontstretch and the other side was behind the current grandstands and the straightaways were connected by tight turns. It is the oldest track to continually host national championship dirt track racing, holding its first national championship race in 1934 under the American Automobile Association banner. It is the home of five world records for automobile racing, making it one of the fastest dirt tracks in the world. Since 1993, the venue is managed by Bob Sargent's Track Enterprises.

=== Entry list ===
- (R) denotes rookie driver

| # | Driver | Team | Make | Sponsor |
|---|---|---|---|---|
| 01 | Dallas Frueh | Fast Track Racing | Ford | Fast Track High Performance Driving School |
| 2 | Nick Sanchez | Rev Racing | Chevrolet | Gainbridge, Max Siegel Inc. |
| 03 | Alex Clubb | Clubb Racing Inc. | Ford | Fish Fin, BubnMuthas, Raysir Apparel |
| 06 | Zachary Tinkle | Wayne Peterson Racing | Toyota | GreatRailing.com |
| 6 | Rajah Caruth (R) | Rev Racing | Chevrolet | Gainbridge, Max Siegel Inc. |
| 10 | Tim Monroe | Fast Track Racing | Chevrolet | Riverside Chevrolet |
| 11 | Ken Schrader | Fast Track Racing | Ford | Tim Delrose, Dale Holt, UTI |
| 12 | Bryce Haugeberg | Fast Track Racing | Chevrolet | Magnum Contracting, UTI |
| 15 | Buddy Kofoid | Venturini Motorsports | Toyota | Mobil 1 |
| 16 | Kelly Kovski | Allgaier Motorsports | Chevrolet | Schluckebier Farms, Affordable Shred |
| 17 | Taylor Gray | David Gilliland Racing | Ford | Ford Performance, Mission 22 |
| 18 | Sammy Smith (R) | Kyle Busch Motorsports | Toyota | TMC Transportation |
| 20 | Jesse Love (R) | Venturini Motorsports | Toyota | JBL |
| 24 | Ryan Unzicker | Hendren Motorsports | Chevrolet | RJR Transportation, Hummingbird Winery |
| 25 | Toni Breidinger (R) | Venturini Motorsports | Toyota | Pit Viper Sunglasses |
| 30 | Amber Balcaen (R) | Rette Jones Racing | Toyota | ICON Direct |
| 35 | Greg Van Alst | Greg Van Alst Motorsports | Ford | CB Fabricating |
| 43 | Daniel Dye (R) | GMS Racing | Chevrolet | Race to Stop Suicide |
| 44 | Buck Stevens | Ferrier-McClure Racing | Ford | Ferrier-McClure Racing |
| 48 | Brad Smith | Brad Smith Motorsports | Chevrolet | PSST...Copraya Websites |
| 69 | Will Kimmel | Kimmel Racing | Ford | Kimmel Racing |
Official entry list

== Practice/Qualifying ==
Practice and qualifying were both cancelled due to inclement weather. The starting lineup would be determined by owner points. As a result, Jesse Love, driving for Venturini Motorsports, would take the pole.

| Pos. | # | Name | Team | Make |
|---|---|---|---|---|
| 1 | 20 | Jesse Love (R) | Venturini Motorsports | Toyota |
| 2 | 2 | Nick Sanchez | Rev Racing | Chevrolet |
| 3 | 18 | Sammy Smith (R) | Kyle Busch Motorsports | Toyota |
| 4 | 43 | Daniel Dye (R) | GMS Racing | Chevrolet |
| 5 | 6 | Rajah Caruth (R) | Rev Racing | Chevrolet |
| 6 | 15 | Buddy Kofoid | Venturini Motorsports | Toyota |
| 7 | 35 | Greg Van Alst | Greg Van Alst Motorsports | Ford |
| 8 | 25 | Toni Breidinger (R) | Venturini Motorsports | Toyota |
| 9 | 11 | Ken Schrader | Fast Track Racing | Ford |
| 10 | 30 | Amber Balcaen (R) | Rette Jones Racing | Toyota |
| 11 | 12 | Bryce Haugeberg | Fast Track Racing | Chevrolet |
| 12 | 10 | Tim Monroe | Fast Track Racing | Chevrolet |
| 13 | 03 | Alex Clubb | Clubb Racing Inc. | Ford |
| 14 | 48 | Brad Smith | Brad Smith Motorsports | Chevrolet |
| 15 | 06 | Zachary Tinkle | Wayne Peterson Racing | Toyota |
| 16 | 01 | Dallas Frueh | Fast Track Racing | Ford |
| 17 | 17 | Taylor Gray | David Gilliland Racing | Ford |
| 18 | 69 | Will Kimmel | Kimmel Racing | Ford |
| 19 | 44 | Buck Stevens | Ferrier-McClure Racing | Ford |
| 20 | 24 | Ryan Unzicker | Hendren Motorsports | Chevrolet |
| 21 | 16 | Kelly Kovski | Allgaier Motorsports | Chevrolet |
Official starting lineup

== Race results ==
| Fin. | St | # | Driver | Team | Make | Laps | Led | Status | Pts |
|---|---|---|---|---|---|---|---|---|---|
| 1 | 1 | 20 | Jesse Love (R) | Venturini Motorsports | Toyota | 74 | 74 | Running | 48 |
| 2 | 6 | 15 | Buddy Kofoid | Venturini Motorsports | Toyota | 74 | 0 | Running | 42 |
| 3 | 20 | 24 | Ryan Unzicker | Hendren Motorsports | Chevrolet | 74 | 0 | Running | 41 |
| 4 | 3 | 18 | Sammy Smith (R) | Kyle Busch Motorsports | Toyota | 74 | 0 | Running | 40 |
| 5 | 2 | 2 | Nick Sanchez | Rev Racing | Chevrolet | 74 | 0 | Running | 39 |
| 6 | 5 | 6 | Rajah Caruth (R) | Rev Racing | Chevrolet | 74 | 0 | Running | 38 |
| 7 | 4 | 43 | Daniel Dye (R) | GMS Racing | Chevrolet | 74 | 0 | Running | 37 |
| 8 | 17 | 17 | Taylor Gray | David Gilliland Racing | Ford | 74 | 0 | Running | 36 |
| 9 | 9 | 11 | Ken Schrader | Fast Track Racing | Ford | 72 | 0 | Running | 35 |
| 10 | 11 | 12 | Bryce Haugeberg | Fast Track Racing | Chevrolet | 71 | 0 | Running | 34 |
| 11 | 13 | 03 | Alex Clubb | Clubb Racing Inc. | Ford | 70 | 0 | Running | 33 |
| 12 | 15 | 06 | Zachary Tinkle | Wayne Peterson Racing | Toyota | 67 | 0 | Running | 32 |
| 13 | 7 | 35 | Greg Van Alst | Greg Van Alst Motorsports | Ford | 53 | 0 | Rear End | 31 |
| 14 | 10 | 30 | Amber Balcaen (R) | Rette Jones Racing | Toyota | 51 | 0 | Overheating | 30 |
| 15 | 21 | 16 | Kelly Kovski | Allgaier Motorsports | Chevrolet | 42 | 0 | Overheating | 29 |
| 16 | 18 | 69 | Will Kimmel | Kimmel Racing | Ford | 28 | 0 | Overheating | 28 |
| 17 | 19 | 44 | Buck Stevens | Ferrier-McClure Racing | Ford | 25 | 0 | Overheating | 27 |
| 18 | 8 | 25 | Toni Breidinger (R) | Venturini Motorsports | Toyota | 25 | 0 | Oil Leak | 26 |
| 19 | 12 | 10 | Tim Monroe | Fast Track Racing | Chevrolet | 11 | 0 | Overheating | 25 |
| 20 | 16 | 01 | Dallas Frueh | Fast Track Racing | Ford | 4 | 0 | Transmission | 24 |
| 21 | 14 | 48 | Brad Smith | Brad Smith Motorsports | Chevrolet | 2 | 0 | Brakes | 23 |
Official race results

== Standings after the race ==
Drivers' Championship standings

| Pos | Driver | Points |
|---|---|---|
| 1 | Nick Sanchez | 642 |
| 2 | Daniel Dye | 629 (-13) |
| 3 | Rajah Caruth | 625 (-17) |
| 4 | Greg Van Alst | 537 (-105) |
| 5 | Toni Breidinger | 532 (-110) |
| 6 | Amber Balcaen | 496 (-146) |
| 7 | Sammy Smith | 476 (-166) |
| 8 | Brad Smith | 443 (-199) |
| 9 | Taylor Gray | 411 (-231) |
| 10 | Jesse Love | 399 (-243) |

- Note: Only the first 10 positions are included for the driver standings.

| Previous race: 2022 General Tire Delivers 100 | ARCA Menards Series; 2022 season | Next race: 2022 Sprecher 150 |
