= Dylan Fetcho =

American racing driver

- Born: August 25, 2000 (age 26); Lebanon, Tennessee, U.S.

ARCA Menards Series career
- 1 race run over 1 year
- Best finish: 88th (2022)
- First race: 2022 Reese's 150 (Indanapolis)
Wins	Top tens	Poles
0	0	0
- Statistics up to date as of January 29, 2025.

Dylan Fetcho (born August 25, 2000) is an American professional stock car racing driver who has competed in the ARCA Menards Series, having last driven the No. 95 Toyota for MAN Motorsports.

Fetcho has also previously competed in series such as the ASA STARS National Tour, the ASA CRA Super Series, the ASA Southern Super Series, and the CARS Pro Late Model Tour.

== Motorsports results ==
=== Stock car career summary ===
Season	Series	Team	Races	Wins	Top 5	Top 10	Points	Position
2022	ARCA Menards Series	MAN Motorsports	1	0	0	0	32	88th
2024	ASA STARS National Tour	Scott Fetcho	2	0	0	1	76	34th
2024	CARS Pro Late Model Tour	Dylan Fetcho Racing	1	0	1	1	0	N/A
2025	ASA STARS National Tour	Dylan Fetcho Racing	1	0	1	1	70	40th
2026	ASA STARS National Tour	Dylan Fetcho Racing	3	0	0	1		
2026	CARS Late Model Stock Car Tour	Mike Darne Racing	5	0	2	4	161	25th

=== ARCA Menards Series ===
(key) (Bold – Pole position awarded by qualifying time. Italics – Pole position earned by points standings or practice time. * – Most laps led.)

ARCA Menards Series results
Year	Team	No.	Make	1	2	3	4	5	6	7	8	9	10	11	12	13	14	15	16	17	18	19	20	AMSC	Pts	Ref
2022	MAN Motorsports	95	Toyota	DAY	PHO	TAL	KAN	CLT	IOW	BLN	ELK	MOH	POC	IRP; 12	MCH	GLN	ISF	MLW	DSF	KAN	BRI	SLM	TOL	88th	32	

=== CARS Late Model Stock Car Tour ===
(key) (Bold – Pole position awarded by qualifying time. Italics – Pole position earned by points standings or practice time. * – Most laps led. ** – All laps led.)

CARS Late Model Stock Car Tour results
Year	Team	No.	Make	1	2	3	4	5	6	7	8	9	10	11	12	13	14	CLMSCTC	Pts	Ref
2026	Mike Darne Racing	89	Chevy	SNM	WCS	**NSV**; 3	CRW; 5	ACE; 7	LGY	DOM								25th	161	
2026	Mike Darne Racing	99	Chevy								NWS; 30	HCY	AND	FLC	TCM; 7	NPS	SBO	25th	161	

=== CARS Pro Late Model Tour ===
(key)

CARS Pro Late Model Tour results
Year	Team	No.	Make	1	2	3	4	5	6	7	8	9	10	11	12	13	CPLMTC	Pts	Ref
2024	Dylan Fetcho Racing	89	N/A	SNM	HCY	OCS	ACE	TCM	CRW	HCY	NWS; 4	ACE	FLC	SBO	TCM	NWS	N/A	0	

=== ASA STARS National Tour ===
(key) (Bold – Pole position awarded by qualifying time. Italics – Pole position earned by points standings or practice time. * – Most laps led. ** – All laps led.)

ASA STARS National Tour results
Year	Team	No.	Make	1	2	3	4	5	6	7	8	9	10	11	12	ASNTC	Pts	Ref
2024	Scott Fetcho	89	Chevy	NSM	FIF; 29	HCY	MAD	MLW	AND	OWO	TOL	WIN	NSV; 7			34th	76	
2025	Dylan Fetcho Racing	89	Chevy	NSM	FIF	DOM	HCY	NPS	MAD	SLG	AND	OWO	TOL	WIN	NSV; 4	40th	70	
2026	Dylan Fetcho Racing	89	Chevy	NSM	FIF; 20	HCY	SLG	MAD	NPS	OWO	TRI; 19	WIN	NSV; 7	NSM		-*	-*	
