= 2022 Rust-Oleum Automotive Finishes 100 =

16th race of the 2022 ARCA Menards Series

Race details
- Race 16 of 20 of the 2022 ARCA Menards Series
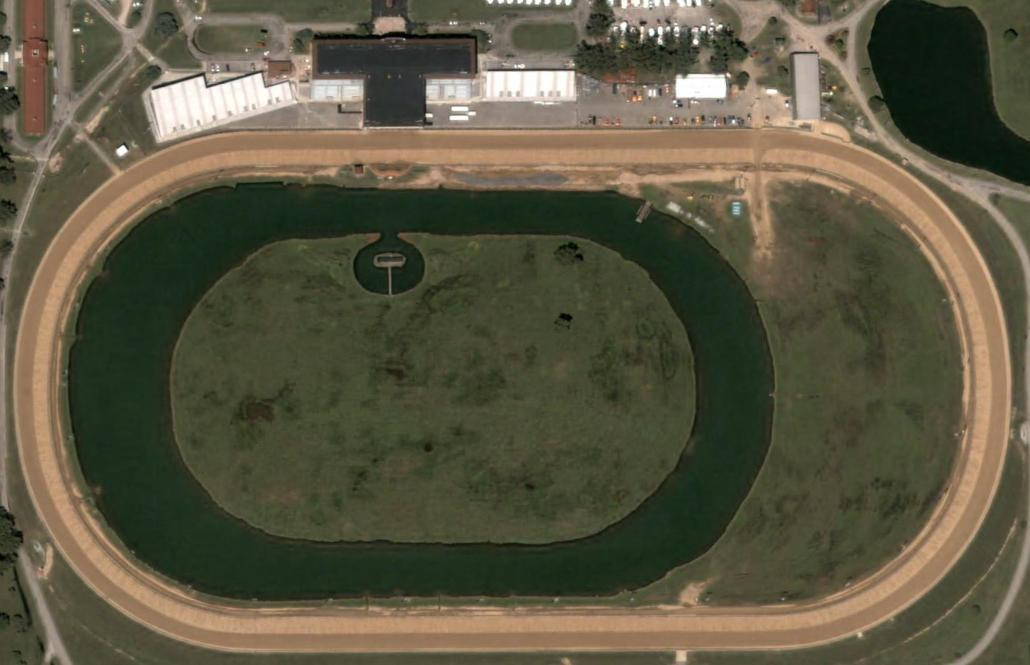
- Date: September 5, 2022
- Official name: 42nd Annual Rust-Oleum Automotive Finishes 100
- Location: DuQuoin State Fairgrounds Racetrack, Du Quoin, Illinois
- Course: Permanent racing facility
- Course length: 1 miles (1.6 km)
- Distance: 78 laps, 78 mi (126 km)
- Scheduled distance: 100 laps, 100 mi (160 km)
- Average speed: 58.354 mph (93.912 km/h)

Pole position
Driver	Jesse Love	Venturini Motorsports
- Grid positions set by competition-based formula

Most laps led
Driver	Ryan Unzicker	Hendren Motorsports
- Laps: 63

Winner
No. 24	Ryan Unzicker	Hendren Motorsports

Television in the United States
- Network: MAVTV
- Announcers: Bob Dillner, Jim Tretow

Radio in the United States
- Radio: ARCA Racing Network

The 2022 Rust-Oleum Automotive Finishes 100 was the 16th stock car race of the 2022 ARCA Menards Series season, and the 36th iteration of the event. The race was scheduled to be held on Sunday, September 4, 2022, but due to inclement weather, the race would later be held on Monday, September 5, in Du Quoin, Illinois at The DuQuoin State Fairgrounds Racetrack, a 1 mile (1.6 km) permanent oval-shaped dirt track. The race was decreased from 100 laps to 78 laps, due to inclement weather. In a dominating fashion, Ryan Unzicker, driving for Hendren Motorsports, held off Jesse Love for his second career ARCA Menards Series win, and his first of the season. This was also a special win, as Unzicker's team owner, Bill Hendren, is going to retire after the 2022 season. This was their last scheduled race. To fill out the podium, Sammy Smith, driving for Kyle Busch Motorsports, would finish in 3rd, respectively.

== Entry list ==
- (R) denotes rookie driver

#	Driver	Team	Make	Sponsor
01	Zachary Tinkle	Fast Track Racing	Ford	Racing for Rescues
2	Nick Sanchez	Rev Racing	Chevrolet	Gainbridge, Max Siegel Inc.
03	Alex Clubb	Clubb Racing Inc.	Ford	Clubb Racing Inc.
06	Nate Moeller	Wayne Peterson Racing	Toyota	GreatRailing.com
6	Rajah Caruth (R)	Rev Racing	Chevrolet	Max Siegel Inc.
10	Joe Cooksey	Fast Track Racing	Toyota	Fuelvend, Hot 2 Go Pizza
11	Ken Schrader	Fast Track Racing	Ford	Delrose, Holt Racing Associates, Double H Ranch
12	Tim Monroe	Fast Track Racing	Chevrolet	Mark Rumbold Farms, Riverside Chevrolet
15	Corey Heim	Venturini Motorsports	Toyota	JBL
16	Kelly Kovski	Allgaier Motorsports	Chevrolet	Schluckebier Farms, Allgaier Performance Parts
17	Taylor Gray	David Gilliland Racing	Ford	Ford Performance
18	Sammy Smith (R)	Kyle Busch Motorsports	Toyota	TMC Transportation
20	Jesse Love (R)	Venturini Motorsports	Toyota	Yahoo!
24	Ryan Unzicker	Hendren Motorsports	Chevrolet	RJR Transportation, Hummingbird Winery
25	Toni Breidinger (R)	Venturini Motorsports	Toyota	Venturini Motorsports
30	Amber Balcaen (R)	Rette Jones Racing	Toyota	ICON Direct
35	Greg Van Alst	Greg Van Alst Motorsports	Ford	CB Fabricating
43	Daniel Dye (R)	GMS Racing	Chevrolet	Champion Container
44	Buck Stevens	Ferrier-McClure Racing	Ford	Ferrier-McClure Racing
48	Brad Smith	Brad Smith Motorsports	Chevrolet	PSST...Copraya Websites
69	Will Kimmel	Kimmel Racing	Ford	E3 Spark Plugs
Official entry list

== Practice/Qualifying ==
Practice and qualifying were both cancelled due to inclement weather. It was originally scheduled to be held on Sunday, September 4. The starting lineup would be based on owner points. As a result, Jesse Love, driving for Venturini Motorsports, would earn the pole.

Pos.	#	Name	Team	Make
1	20	Jesse Love (R)	Venturini Motorsports	Toyota
2	18	Sammy Smith (R)	Kyle Busch Motorsports	Toyota
3	2	Nick Sanchez	Rev Racing	Chevrolet
4	43	Daniel Dye (R)	GMS Racing	Chevrolet
5	15	Corey Heim	Venturini Motorsports	Toyota
6	6	Rajah Caruth (R)	Rev Racing	Chevrolet
7	35	Greg Van Alst	Greg Van Alst Motorsports	Ford
8	25	Toni Breidinger (R)	Venturini Motorsports	Toyota
9	11	Ken Schrader	Fast Track Racing	Ford
10	30	Amber Balcaen (R)	Rette Jones Racing	Toyota
11	12	Tim Monroe	Fast Track Racing	Chevrolet
12	03	Alex Clubb	Clubb Racing Inc.	Ford
13	10	Joe Cooksey	Fast Track Racing	Toyota
14	48	Brad Smith	Brad Smith Motorsports	Chevrolet
15	06	Nate Moeller	Wayne Peterson Racing	Toyota
16	01	Zachary Tinkle	Fast Track Racing	Ford
17	17	Taylor Gray	David Gilliland Racing	Ford
18	44	Buck Stevens	Ferrier-McClure Racing	Ford
19	69	Will Kimmel	Kimmel Racing	Ford
20	24	Ryan Unzicker	Hendren Motorsports	Chevrolet
21	16	Kelly Kovski	Allgaier Motorsports	Chevrolet
Official starting lineup

== Race results ==
Fin.	St	#	Driver	Team	Make	Laps	Led	Status	Pts
1	20	24	Ryan Unzicker	Hendren Motorsports	Chevrolet	78	63	Running	48
2	1	20	Jesse Love (R)	Venturini Motorsports	Toyota	78	15	Running	43
3	2	18	Sammy Smith (R)	Kyle Busch Motorsports	Toyota	78	0	Running	41
4	4	43	Daniel Dye (R)	GMS Racing	Chevrolet	78	0	Running	40
5	3	2	Nick Sanchez	Rev Racing	Chevrolet	78	0	Running	39
6	7	35	Greg Van Alst	Greg Van Alst Motorsports	Ford	78	0	Running	38
7	11	12	Tim Monroe	Fast Track Racing	Chevrolet	78	0	Running	37
8	13	10	Joe Cooksey	Fast Track Racing	Toyota	74	0	Running	36
9	5	15	Corey Heim	Venturini Motorsports	Toyota	73	0	Running	35
10	21	16	Kelly Kovski	Allgaier Motorsports	Chevrolet	58	0	Suspension	34
11	14	48	Brad Smith	Brad Smith Motorsports	Chevrolet	40	0	Engine	33
12	17	17	Taylor Gray	David Gilliland Racing	Ford	39	0	Engine	32
13	8	25	Toni Breidinger (R)	Venturini Motorsports	Toyota	35	0	Radiator	31
14	10	30	Amber Balcaen (R)	Rette Jones Racing	Toyota	32	0	Rear End	30
15	15	06	Nate Moeller	Wayne Peterson Racing	Toyota	22	0	Suspension	29
16	9	11	Ken Schrader	Fast Track Racing	Ford	21	0	Overheating	28
17	6	6	Rajah Caruth (R)	Rev Racing	Chevrolet	17	0	Overheating	27
18	16	01	Zachary Tinkle	Fast Track Racing	Ford	16	0	Brakes	26
19	19	69	Will Kimmel	Kimmel Racing	Ford	12	0	Overheating	25
20	18	44	Buck Stevens	Ferrier-McClure Racing	Ford	2	0	Accident	24
21	12	03	Alex Clubb	Clubb Racing Inc.	Ford	1	0	Overheating	23
Official race results

== Standings after the race ==
Drivers' Championship standings

	Pos	Driver	Points
	1	Nick Sanchez	770
	2	Daniel Dye	760 (-10)
	3	Rajah Caruth	742 (-28)
	4	Greg Van Alst	662 (-108)
	5	Toni Breidinger	645 (-125)
1	6	Sammy Smith	616 (-154)
1	7	Amber Balcaen	606 (-164)
	8	Brad Smith	549 (-221)
	9	Taylor Gray	486 (-284)
1	10	Jesse Love	483 (-287)

- Note: Only the first 10 positions are included for the driver standings.

Previous race: 2022 Sprecher 150	ARCA Menards Series; 2022 season	Next race: 2022 Kansas Lottery 150
