= 2022 Henry Ford Health 200 =

12th race of the 2022 ARCA Menards Series

2022 Henry Ford Health System 200
Race details
- Race 12 of 20 of the 2022 ARCA Menards Series
- Date: August 6, 2022
- Official name: 34th Annual Henry Ford Health System 200
- Location: Michigan International Speedway, Brooklyn, Michigan
- Course: Permanent racing facility
- Course length: 2.0 miles (3.2 km)
- Distance: 100 laps, 200 mi (320 km)
- Scheduled distance: 100 laps, 200 mi (320 km)
- Average speed: 132.353 mph (213.002 km/h)

Pole position
| Driver | Corey Heim | Venturini Motorsports |
- Time: 38.942

Most laps led
| Driver | Corey Heim | Venturini Motorsports |
- Laps: 54

Winner
| No. 2 | Nick Sanchez | Rev Racing |

Television in the United States
- Network: MAVTV
- Announcers: Krista Voda, Jim Tretow

Radio in the United States
- Radio: Motor Racing Network

The 2022 Henry Ford Health System 200 was the 12th stock car race of the 2022 ARCA Menards Series season, and the 34th iteration of the event. The race was held on Saturday, August 6, 2022, in Brooklyn, Michigan at Michigan International Speedway, a 2.0 mile (3.2 km) permanent oval-shaped racetrack. The race was contested over 100 laps. In an exciting battle for the win, Nick Sanchez, driving for Rev Racing, held off Daniel Dye and Corey Heim in the final few laps for his fourth career ARCA Menards Series win, and his third of the season. Heim would mostly dominate the race, leading 54 laps.

== Background ==
Michigan International Speedway (MIS) is a 2-mile (3.2 km) moderate-banked D-shaped speedway located off U.S. Highway 12 on more than 1,400 acres (5.7 km^{2}) approximately four miles (6.4 km) south of the village of Brooklyn, in the scenic Irish Hills area of southeastern Michigan. The track is 70 miles (110 km) west of the center of Detroit, 40 miles (64 km) from Ann Arbor and 60 miles (97 km) south and northwest of Lansing and Toledo, Ohio respectively. The track is used primarily for NASCAR events. It is sometimes known as a sister track to Texas World Speedway, and was used as the basis of Auto Club Speedway. The track is owned by NASCAR. Michigan International Speedway is recognized as one of motorsports' premier facilities because of its wide racing surface and high banking (by open-wheel standards; the 18-degree banking is modest by stock car standards). Michigan is the fastest track in NASCAR due to its wide, sweeping corners, long straightaways, and lack of a restrictor plate requirement; typical qualifying speeds are in excess of 200 mph (320 km/h) and corner entry speeds are anywhere from 215 to 220 mph (346 to 354 km/h) after the 2012 repaving of the track.

=== Entry list ===
- (R) denotes rookie driver

| # | Driver | Team | Make | Sponsor |
|---|---|---|---|---|
| 01 | Dallas Frueh | Fast Track Racing | Chevrolet | Universal Technical Institute |
| 2 | Nick Sanchez | Rev Racing | Chevrolet | Max Siegel Inc. |
| 03 | Alex Clubb | Clubb Racing Inc. | Ford | Clubb Racing Inc., Josh's Eggs |
| 06 | Zachary Tinkle | Wayne Peterson Racing | Toyota | GreatRailing.com |
| 6 | Rajah Caruth (R) | Rev Racing | Chevrolet | Max Siegel Inc. |
| 10 | Tim Monroe | Fast Track Racing | Ford | Fast Track Racing |
| 11 | Morgen Baird | Fast Track Racing | Toyota | Long Drink, Experience Jackson |
| 12 | D. L. Wilson | Fast Track Racing | Chevrolet | Wilson Traditional Metals |
| 15 | Gus Dean | Venturini Motorsports | Toyota | Dean Custom Air |
| 18 | Sammy Smith (R) | Kyle Busch Motorsports | Toyota | TMC Transportation |
| 20 | Corey Heim | Venturini Motorsports | Toyota | Crescent Tools |
| 23 | Bret Holmes | Bret Holmes Racing | Chevrolet | Golden Eagle Syrup |
| 25 | Toni Breidinger (R) | Venturini Motorsports | Toyota | HairClub |
| 30 | Amber Balcaen (R) | Rette Jones Racing | Ford | ICON Direct |
| 35 | Greg Van Alst | Greg Van Alst Motorsports | Ford | CB Fabricating, Top Choice Fence |
| 43 | Daniel Dye (R) | GMS Racing | Chevrolet | Helm |
| 48 | Brad Smith | Brad Smith Motorsports | Chevrolet | PSST...Copraya Websites |
| 65 | Jeffery MacZink | MacZink Racing | Toyota | SYNCON Performance Flooring |
| 69 | Scott Melton | Kimmel Racing | Toyota | Melton-McFadden Insurance Agency |
| 72 | Cody Coughlin | Coughlin Brothers Racing | Ford | JEGS |
| 97 | Jason Kitzmiller | CR7 Motorsports | Chevrolet | A. L. L. Construction |
Official entry list

== Practice ==
The only 35-minute practice session was held on Saturday, August 6, at 10:45 a.m. EST. Sammy Smith, driving for Kyle Busch Motorsports, was the fastest in the session, with a lap of 39.773, and an average speed of 181.027 mph (291.335 km/h).

| Pos. | # | Driver | Team | Make | Time | Speed |
|---|---|---|---|---|---|---|
| 1 | 18 | Sammy Smith (R) | Kyle Busch Motorsports | Toyota | 39.773 | 181.027 |
| 2 | 2 | Nick Sanchez | Rev Racing | Chevrolet | 39.889 | 180.501 |
| 3 | 6 | Rajah Caruth (R) | Rev Racing | Chevrolet | 40.028 | 179.874 |
Full practice results

== Qualifying ==
Qualifying was held on Saturday, August 6, at 11:30 a.m. EST. The qualifying system used is a single-car, one-lap system with only one round. Whoever sets the fastest time in the round wins the pole. Corey Heim, driving for Venturini Motorsports, scored the pole for the race, with a lap of 38.942, and an average speed of 184.890 mph (297.552 km/h).

| Pos. | # | Name | Team | Make | Time | Speed |
|---|---|---|---|---|---|---|
| 1 | 20 | Corey Heim | Venturini Motorsports | Toyota | 38.942 | 184.890 |
| 2 | 18 | Sammy Smith (R) | Kyle Busch Motorsports | Toyota | 39.414 | 182.676 |
| 3 | 23 | Bret Holmes | Bret Holmes Racing | Chevrolet | 39.726 | 181.242 |
| 4 | 6 | Rajah Caruth (R) | Rev Racing | Chevrolet | 39.941 | 180.266 |
| 5 | 2 | Nick Sanchez | Rev Racing | Chevrolet | 39.961 | 180.176 |
| 6 | 15 | Gus Dean | Venturini Motorsports | Toyota | 40.180 | 179.194 |
| 7 | 30 | Amber Balcaen (R) | Rette Jones Racing | Ford | 40.185 | 179.171 |
| 8 | 72 | Cody Coughlin | Coughlin Brothers Racing | Ford | 40.904 | 176.022 |
| 9 | 97 | Jason Kitzmiller | CR7 Motorsports | Chevrolet | 40.948 | 175.833 |
| 10 | 35 | Greg Van Alst | Greg Van Alst Motorsports | Ford | 41.153 | 174.957 |
| 11 | 69 | Scott Melton | Kimmel Racing | Toyota | 41.405 | 173.892 |
| 12 | 25 | Toni Breidinger (R) | Venturini Motorsports | Toyota | 41.909 | 171.801 |
| 13 | 11 | Morgan Baird | Fast Track Racing | Toyota | 42.578 | 169.101 |
| 14 | 12 | D. L. Wilson | Fast Track Racing | Chevrolet | 44.855 | 160.517 |
| 15 | 01 | Dallas Frueh | Fast Track Racing | Chevrolet | 45.680 | 157.618 |
| 16 | 48 | Brad Smith | Brad Smith Motorsports | Chevrolet | 47.961 | 150.122 |
| 17 | 03 | Alex Clubb | Clubb Racing Inc. | Ford | 48.363 | 148.874 |
| 18 | 10 | Tim Monroe | Fast Track Racing | Ford | 50.816 | 141.688 |
| 19 | 43 | Daniel Dye (R) | GMS Racing | Chevrolet | - | - |
| 20 | 06 | Zachary Tinkle | Wayne Peterson Racing | Toyota | - | - |
| 21 | 65 | Jeffery MacZink | MacZink Racing | Toyota | - | - |
Official qualifying results

== Race results ==
| Fin. | St | # | Driver | Team | Make | Laps | Led | Status | Pts |
|---|---|---|---|---|---|---|---|---|---|
| 1 | 5 | 2 | Nick Sanchez | Rev Racing | Chevrolet | 100 | 35 | Running | 47 |
| 2 | 1 | 20 | Corey Heim | Venturini Motorsports | Toyota | 100 | 54 | Running | 44 |
| 3 | 19 | 43 | Daniel Dye (R) | GMS Racing | Chevrolet | 100 | 0 | Running | 41 |
| 4 | 2 | 18 | Sammy Smith (R) | Kyle Busch Motorsports | Toyota | 100 | 2 | Running | 41 |
| 5 | 6 | 15 | Gus Dean | Venturini Motorsports | Toyota | 100 | 0 | Running | 39 |
| 6 | 4 | 6 | Rajah Caruth (R) | Rev Racing | Chevrolet | 100 | 0 | Running | 38 |
| 7 | 3 | 23 | Bret Holmes | Bret Holmes Racing | Chevrolet | 100 | 9 | Running | 38 |
| 8 | 8 | 72 | Cody Coughlin | Coughlin Brothers Racing | Ford | 100 | 0 | Running | 36 |
| 9 | 10 | 35 | Greg Van Alst | Greg Van Alst Motorsports | Ford | 100 | 0 | Running | 35 |
| 10 | 13 | 11 | Morgan Baird | Fast Track Racing | Toyota | 100 | 0 | Running | 34 |
| 11 | 12 | 25 | Toni Breidinger (R) | Venturini Motorsports | Toyota | 98 | 0 | Running | 33 |
| 12 | 9 | 97 | Jason Kitzmiller | CR7 Motorsports | Chevrolet | 97 | 0 | Running | 32 |
| 13 | 14 | 12 | D. L. Wilson | Fast Track Racing | Chevrolet | 95 | 0 | Running | 31 |
| 14 | 21 | 65 | Jeffery MacZink | MacZink Racing | Toyota | 95 | 0 | Running | 30 |
| 15 | 11 | 69 | Scott Melton | Kimmel Racing | Toyota | 83 | 0 | Accident | 29 |
| 16 | 16 | 48 | Brad Smith | Brad Smith Motorsports | Chevrolet | 76 | 0 | Running | 28 |
| 17 | 17 | 03 | Alex Clubb | Clubb Racing Inc. | Ford | 70 | 0 | Running | 27 |
| 18 | 7 | 30 | Amber Balcaen (R) | Rette Jones Racing | Ford | 23 | 0 | Accident | 26 |
| 19 | 18 | 10 | Tim Monroe | Fast Track Racing | Ford | 5 | 0 | Overheating | 25 |
| 20 | 15 | 01 | Dallas Frueh | Fast Track Racing | Chevrolet | 3 | 0 | Engine | 24 |
| 21 | 20 | 06 | Zachary Tinkle | Wayne Peterson Racing | Toyota | 0 | 0 | Did Not Start | 23 |
Official race results

== Standings after the race ==
Drivers' Championship standings

| | Pos | Driver | Points |
|---|---|---|---|
| 1 | 1 | Nick Sanchez | 561 |
| 1 | 2 | Rajah Caruth | 554 (-7) |
| | 3 | Daniel Dye | 552 (-9) |
| 1 | 4 | Greg Van Alst | 477 (-84) |
| 1 | 5 | Toni Breidinger | 476 (-85) |
| | 6 | Amber Balcaen | 441 (-120) |
| | 7 | Brad Smith | 400 (-161) |
| | 8 | Sammy Smith | 394 (-167) |
| | 9 | Taylor Gray | 339 (-222) |
| 1 | 10 | D. L. Wilson | 328 (-233) |

- Note: Only the first 10 positions are included for the driver standings.

| Previous race: 2022 Reese's 200 | ARCA Menards Series; 2022 season | Next race: 2022 General Tire Delivers 100 |
