= Hendren Motorsports =

Former American stock car team

- Owner: Bill Hendren
- Series: ARCA Menards Series
- Race drivers: Ryan Unzicker, Bob Strait, Michael Simko, Damon Lusk, Bryan Reffner
- Manufacturer: Chevrolet, Toyota, Ford
- Opened: 1999
- Closed: 2022

Career
- Drivers' Championships: 0
- Race victories: 2

Hendren Motorsports is a former American stock car racing team that ran from 1999 to 2022. It primarily fielded entries in the ARCA Racing Series, and was owned by Bill Hendren. The team primarily ran at various dirt track events in the series, including the Illinois State Fairgrounds and the DuQuoin State Fairgrounds. The team won two races in its history, both coming with Ryan Unzicker, with the first coming at Springfield in 2020, and the second and last coming at DuQuoin, in what was the team's final race before closing down at the end of the year.
