= 2022 General Tire Delivers 100 =

13th race of the 2022 ARCA Menards Series

Race details
- Race 13 of 20 of the 2022 ARCA Menards Series; Race 7 of 10 of the 2022 Sioux Chief Showdown
- Date: August 19, 2022
- Official name: 2nd Annual General Tire Delivers 100
- Location: Watkins Glen International, Watkins Glen, New York
- Course: Permanent racing facility
- Course length: 2.454 miles (3.949 km)
- Distance: 41 laps, 100.4 mi (161.578 km)
- Scheduled distance: 41 laps, 100.4 mi (161.578 km)
- Average speed: 78.104 mph (125.696 km/h)

Pole position
Driver	Sammy Smith	Kyle Busch Motorsports
- Time: 1:14.041

Most laps led
Driver	Sammy Smith	Kyle Busch Motorsports
- Laps: 39

Winner
No. 81	Brandon Jones	Joe Gibbs Racing

Television in the United States
- Network: Fox Sports 1
- Announcers: Jamie Little, Trevor Bayne, Phil Parsons

Radio in the United States
- Radio: Motor Racing Network

The 2022 General Tire Delivers 100 was the 13th stock car race of the 2022 ARCA Menards Series season, the 7th race of the 2022 Sioux Chief Showdown, and the 2nd iteration of the event. The race was held on Friday, August 19, 2022, in Watkins Glen, New York at Watkins Glen International, a 2.454 mile (3.949 km) permanent road course. The race took the scheduled 41 laps to complete. After an exciting finish, Brandon Jones, driving for Joe Gibbs Racing, moved Taylor Gray and Sammy Smith for the lead on the final restart, and held on to earn his eighth career ARCA Menards Series win, and his third of the season. Smith would dominate the entire race, leading all but two laps. To fill out the podium, Nick Sanchez, driving for Rev Racing, and Jesse Love, driving for Venturini Motorsports, would finish 2nd and 3rd, respectively.

== Background ==
Watkins Glen International, nicknamed "The Glen", is an automobile race track located in the town of Dix just southwest of the village of Watkins Glen, New York, at the southern tip of Seneca Lake. It was long known around the world as the home of the Formula One United States Grand Prix, which it hosted for twenty consecutive years (1961–1980). In addition, the site has also been home to road racing of nearly every class, including the World Sportscar Championship, Trans-Am, Can-Am, NASCAR Cup Series, the International Motor Sports Association and the IndyCar Series. The facility is currently owned by NASCAR.

=== Entry list ===
- (R) denotes rookie driver

#	Driver	Team	Make	Sponsor
01	Zachary Tinkle	Fast Track Racing	Ford	Racing for Rescues
2	Nick Sanchez	Rev Racing	Chevrolet	Gainbridge, Max Siegel Inc.
03	Casey Carden	Clubb Racing Inc.	Ford	Beachy Blooms, Denton Carden
4	Dale Quarterley	1/4 Ley Racing	Chevrolet	Van Dyk Recycling Solutions, Motul
06	Rita Thomason	Wayne Peterson Racing	Chevrolet	On Target Media
6	Rajah Caruth (R)	Rev Racing	Chevrolet	Gainbridge, Max Siegel Inc.
7	Ed Bull	Bull Racing	Ford	Bayside Chiropractic
10	Tim Monroe	Fast Track Racing	Chevrolet	Universal Technical Institute
11	Stanton Barrett	Fast Track Racing	Toyota	SBFWines.com, Horseheads Brewing
12	Ed Pompa	Fast Track Racing	Toyota	HyTorc, Double H Ranch
15	Parker Chase	Venturini Motorsports	Toyota	Vertical Bridge
17	Taylor Gray	David Gilliland Racing	Ford	Ford Performance, Mission 22
18	Sammy Smith (R)	Kyle Busch Motorsports	Toyota	TMC Transportation
20	Jesse Love (R)	Venturini Motorsports	Toyota	Yahoo!
23	Connor Mosack	Bret Holmes Racing	Chevrolet	Nic Tailor Custom Underwear
25	Toni Breidinger (R)	Venturini Motorsports	Toyota	FP Movement
30	Amber Balcaen (R)	Rette Jones Racing	Ford	ICON Direct
32	Austin Wayne Self	AM Racing	Chevrolet	AM Technical Solutions
35	Greg Van Alst	Greg Van Alst Motorsports	Ford	CB Fabricating
43	Daniel Dye (R)	GMS Racing	Chevrolet	Champion Container
48	Brad Smith	Brad Smith Motorsports	Chevrolet	PSST...Copraya Websites
55	Conner Jones	Venturini Motorsports	Toyota	Jones Utilities
71	Chris Werth	Werth Racing	Ford	Accede Mold & Tool
73	Andy Jankowiak	Jankowiak Motorsports	Chevrolet	Whelen
81	Brandon Jones	Joe Gibbs Racing	Toyota	Amerilux, Menards
Official entry list

== Practice ==
The only 60-minute practice session was held on Friday, August 19, at 3:15 PM EST. Sammy Smith, driving for Kyle Busch Motorsports, was the fastest in the session, with a lap of 1:14.293, and an average speed of 118.729 mph (191.076 km/h).

Pos.	#	Driver	Team	Make	Time	Speed
1	18	Sammy Smith (R)	Kyle Busch Motorsports	Toyota	1:14.293	118.719
2	23	Connor Mosack	Bret Holmes Racing	Chevrolet	1:14.905	117.749
3	20	Jesse Love (R)	Venturini Motorsports	Toyota	1:14.969	117.649
Full practice results

== Qualifying ==
Qualifying is scheduled to be held on Friday, August 19, at 4:25 PM EST. The qualifying system used is a multiple-car, multiple-lap system with only one round. Whoever sets the fastest time in the round wins the pole. Sammy Smith, driving for Kyle Busch Motorsports, scored the pole for the race, with a lap of 1:14.041, and an average speed of 119.123 mph (191.710 km/h).

Pos.	#	Name	Team	Make	Time	Speed
1	18	Sammy Smith (R)	Kyle Busch Motorsports	Toyota	1:14.041	119.123
2	81	Brandon Jones	Joe Gibbs Racing	Toyota	1:14.402	118.545
3	23	Connor Mosack	Bret Holmes Racing	Chevrolet	1:14.759	117.979
4	17	Taylor Gray	David Gilliland Racing	Ford	1:15.029	117.555
5	20	Jesse Love (R)	Venturini Motorsports	Toyota	1:15.399	116.978
6	2	Nick Sanchez	Rev Racing	Chevrolet	1:15.451	116.897
7	15	Parker Chase	Venturini Motorsports	Toyota	1:15.460	116.883
8	43	Daniel Dye (R)	GMS Racing	Chevrolet	1:15.960	116.114
9	55	Conner Jones	Venturini Motorsports	Toyota	1:16.119	115.871
10	32	Austin Wayne Self	AM Racing	Chevrolet	1:16.224	115.712
11	6	Rajah Caruth (R)	Rev Racing	Chevrolet	1:16.397	115.450
12	4	Dale Quarterley	1/4 Ley Racing	Chevrolet	1:17.141	114.336
13	11	Stanton Barrett	Fast Track Racing	Toyota	1:17.578	113.692
14	35	Greg Van Alst	Greg Van Alst Motorsports	Ford	1:18.946	111.722
15	73	Andy Jankowiak	Jankowiak Motorsports	Chevrolet	1:19.683	110.689
16	71	Chris Werth	Werth Racing	Ford	1:20.214	109.956
17	30	Amber Balcaen (R)	Rette Jones Racing	Ford	1:20.296	109.844
18	25	Toni Breidinger (R)	Venturini Motorsports	Toyota	1:21.804	107.819
19	12	Ed Pompa	Fast Track Racing	Toyota	1:22.203	107.295
20	01	Zachary Tinkle	Fast Track Racing	Ford	1:23.990	105.013
21	7	Ed Bull	Bull Racing	Ford	1:25.007	103.756
22	03	Casey Carden	Clubb Racing Inc.	Ford	1:25.714	102.900
23	10	Tim Monroe	Fast Track Racing	Chevrolet	1:40.270	87.963
24	48	Brad Smith	Brad Smith Motorsports	Chevrolet	1:43.834	84.943
25	06	Rita Thomason	Wayne Peterson Racing	Chevrolet	-	-
Official qualifying results

== Race results ==
Fin.	St	#	Driver	Team	Make	Laps	Led	Status	Pts
1	2	81	Brandon Jones	Joe Gibbs Racing	Toyota	41	1	Running	47
2	6	2	Nick Sanchez	Rev Racing	Chevrolet	41	0	Running	42
3	5	20	Jesse Love (R)	Venturini Motorsports	Toyota	41	0	Running	41
4	8	43	Daniel Dye (R)	GMS Racing	Chevrolet	41	0	Running	40
5	1	18	Sammy Smith (R)	Kyle Busch Motorsports	Toyota	41	39	Running	42
6	7	15	Parker Chase	Venturini Motorsports	Toyota	41	0	Running	38
7	10	32	Austin Wayne Self	AM Racing	Chevrolet	41	0	Running	37
8	4	17	Taylor Gray	David Gilliland Racing	Ford	41	0	Running	36
9	12	4	Dale Quarterley	1/4 Ley Racing	Chevrolet	41	0	Running	35
10	9	55	Conner Jones	Venturini Motorsports	Toyota	41	1	Running	35
11	11	6	Rajah Caruth (R)	Rev Racing	Chevrolet	41	0	Running	33
12	13	11	Stanton Barrett	Fast Track Racing	Toyota	41	0	Running	32
13	14	35	Greg Van Alst	Greg Van Alst Motorsports	Ford	41	0	Running	31
14	18	25	Toni Breidinger (R)	Venturini Motorsports	Toyota	41	0	Running	30
15	22	03	Casey Carden	Clubb Racing Inc.	Ford	41	0	Running	29
16	3	23	Connor Mosack	Bret Holmes Racing	Chevrolet	38	0	Running	28
17	19	12	Ed Pompa	Fast Track Racing	Toyota	37	0	Running	27
18	16	71	Chris Werth	Werth Racing	Ford	32	0	Accident	26
19	17	30	Amber Balcaen (R)	Rette Jones Racing	Ford	32	0	Accident	25
20	25	06	Rita Thomason	Wayne Peterson Racing	Chevrolet	31	0	Running	24
21	21	7	Ed Bull	Bull Racing	Ford	27	0	Running	23
22	15	73	Andy Jankowiak	Jankowiak Motorsports	Chevrolet	3	0	Transmission	22
23	20	01	Zachary Tinkle	Fast Track Racing	Ford	2	0	Transmission	21
24	24	48	Brad Smith	Brad Smith Motorsports	Chevrolet	2	0	Brakes	20
25	23	10	Tim Monroe	Fast Track Racing	Chevrolet	1	0	Oil Pressure	19
Official race results

== Standings after the race ==
Drivers' Championship standings

	Pos	Driver	Points
	1	Nick Sanchez	603
1	2	Daniel Dye	592 (-11)
1	3	Rajah Caruth	587 (-16)
	4	Greg Van Alst	508 (-95)
	5	Toni Breidinger	506 (-97)
	6	Amber Balcaen	466 (-137)
1	7	Sammy Smith	436 (-167)
1	8	Brad Smith	420 (-183)
	9	Taylor Gray	375 (-228)
2	10	Jesse Love	366 (-248)

- Note: Only the first 10 positions are included for the driver standings.

Previous race: 2022 Henry Ford Health 200	ARCA Menards Series; 2022 season	Next race: 2022 Atlas 100
