= 2022 Dawn 150 =

Ninth race of the 2022 ARCA Menards Series

Race details
- Race 9 of 20 of the 2022 ARCA Menards Series; Race 5 of 10 of the 2022 Sioux Chief Showdown
- Date: July 8, 2022
- Official name: Third Annual Dawn 150
- Location: Mid-Ohio Sports Car Course, Lexington, Ohio
- Course: Permanent racing facility
- Course length: 2.400 miles (3.862 km)
- Distance: 42 laps, 94.836 mi (152.62 km)
- Scheduled distance: 42 laps, 94.836 mi (152.62 km)

Pole position
| Driver | John Hunter Nemechek | Venturini Motorsports |
- Time: 1:27.616

Most laps led
| Driver | John Hunter Nemechek | Venturini Motorsports |
- Laps: 31

Winner
| No. 17 | Taylor Gray | David Gilliland Racing |

Television in the United States
- Network: Fox Sports 1
- Announcers: Jamie Little, Phil Parsons

Radio in the United States
- Radio: Motor Racing Network

The 2022 Dawn 150 was the ninth stock car race of the 2022 ARCA Menards Series season, the fifth race of the 2022 Sioux Chief Showdown, and the third iteration of the event. The race was held on Friday, July 8, 2022, in Lexington, Ohio at Mid-Ohio Sports Car Course, a 2.400 mile (3.862 km) permanent road course. The race took its scheduled 42 laps to complete. In a chaotic race, Taylor Gray, driving for David Gilliland Racing, came home with the win, after making a move on Kris Wright with 3 laps to go. This was Gray's second career ARCA Menards Series win, and his second of the season. To fill out the podium, Parker Chase, driving for Venturini Motorsports, and Sammy Smith, driving for Kyle Busch Motorsports, would finish 2nd and 3rd, respectively.

== Background ==
Mid-Ohio Sports Car Course is a road course auto racing facility located in Troy Township, Morrow County, Ohio, United States, just outside the village of Lexington. Mid-Ohio has also colloquially become a term for the entire north-central region of the state, from south of Sandusky to the north of Columbus. It hosts a number of racing series such as IndyCar, IMSA WeatherTech Sportscar Championship, NASCAR Xfinity Series, and the ARCA Menards Series, along with other club events such has SCCA and National Auto Sport Association.

=== Entry list ===
- (R) denotes rookie driver

| # | Driver | Team | Make |
|---|---|---|---|
| 01 | D. L. Wilson | Fast Track Racing | Ford |
| 2 | Nick Sanchez | Rev Racing | Chevrolet |
| 03 | Rita Thomason | Clubb Racing Inc. | Chevrolet |
| 3 | Casey Carden | Mullins Racing | Ford |
| 6 | Rajah Caruth (R) | Rev Racing | Chevrolet |
| 7 | Ed Bull | Bull Racing | Ford |
| 10 | Arnout Kok | Fast Track Racing | Toyota |
| 11 | Stanton Barrett | Fast Track Racing | Toyota |
| 12 | Tony Cosentino | Fast Track Racing | Toyota |
| 15 | Parker Chase | Venturini Motorsports | Toyota |
| 17 | Taylor Gray | David Gilliland Racing | Ford |
| 18 | Sammy Smith (R) | Kyle Busch Motorsports | Toyota |
| 20 | Jesse Love (R) | Venturini Motorsports | Toyota |
| 21 | Jack Wood | Bill McAnally Racing | Toyota |
| 25 | Toni Breidinger (R) | Venturini Motorsports | Toyota |
| 27 | Con Nicolopoulos | Richmond Motorsports | Chevrolet |
| 30 | Amber Balcaen (R) | Rette Jones Racing | Ford |
| 32 | Dale Quarterley | 1/4 Ley Racing | Chevrolet |
| 35 | Greg Van Alst | Greg Van Alst Motorsports | Ford |
| 42 | Kris Wright | Cook Racing Technologies | Chevrolet |
| 43 | Daniel Dye (R) | GMS Racing | Chevrolet |
| 48 | Brad Smith | Brad Smith Motorsports | Chevrolet |
| 55 | John Hunter Nemechek | Venturini Motorsports | Toyota |
| 91 | Colby Howard | Bill McAnally Racing | Toyota |
| 99 | Blaine Perkins | Bill McAnally Racing | Chevrolet |
Official entry list

== Practice/Qualifying ==
Practice and qualifying will be combined into one 60-minute session, with a driver's fastest time counting as their qualifying lap. It was held on Friday, July 8, at 2:00 PM EST.

John Hunter Nemechek, driving for Venturini Motorsports, scored the pole for the race, with a time of 1:27.616 seconds, and a speed of 92.778 mph (149.312 km/h).

| Pos. | # | Name | Team | Make | Time | Speed |
|---|---|---|---|---|---|---|
| 1 | 55 | John Hunter Nemechek | Venturini Motorsports | Toyota | 1:27.616 | 92.778 |
| 2 | 18 | Sammy Smith (R) | Kyle Busch Motorsports | Toyota | 1:27.738 | 92.649 |
| 3 | 2 | Nick Sanchez | Rev Racing | Chevrolet | 1:28.383 | 91.972 |
| 4 | 15 | Parker Chase | Venturini Motorsports | Toyota | 1:28.524 | 91.826 |
| 5 | 6 | Rajah Caruth (R) | Rev Racing | Chevrolet | 1:28.637 | 91.709 |
| 6 | 91 | Colby Howard | Bill McAnally Racing | Toyota | 1:28.913 | 91.424 |
| 7 | 42 | Kris Wright | Cook Racing Technologies | Chevrolet | 1:28.976 | 91.359 |
| 8 | 17 | Taylor Gray | David Gilliland Racing | Ford | 1:29.028 | 91.306 |
| 9 | 20 | Jesse Love (R) | Venturini Motorsports | Toyota | 1:29.765 | 90.556 |
| 10 | 32 | Dale Quarterley | 1/4 Ley Racing | Chevrolet | 1:29.973 | 90.347 |
| 11 | 43 | Daniel Dye (R) | GMS Racing | Chevrolet | 1:30.433 | 89.888 |
| 12 | 35 | Greg Van Alst | Greg Van Alst Motorsports | Ford | 1:31.010 | 89.318 |
| 13 | 99 | Blaine Perkins | Bill McAnally Racing | Chevrolet | 1:31.214 | 89.118 |
| 14 | 11 | Stanton Barrett | Fast Track Racing | Toyota | 1:31.446 | 88.892 |
| 15 | 25 | Toni Breidinger (R) | Venturini Motorsports | Toyota | 1:33.615 | 86.832 |
| 16 | 21 | Jack Wood | Bill McAnally Racing | Toyota | 1:33.705 | 86.749 |
| 17 | 10 | Arnout Kok | Fast Track Racing | Toyota | 1:34.980 | 85.584 |
| 18 | 30 | Amber Balcaen (R) | Rette Jones Racing | Ford | 1:36.300 | 84.411 |
| 19 | 12 | Tony Cosentino | Fast Track Racing | Toyota | 1:38.104 | 82.859 |
| 20 | 7 | Ed Bull | Bull Racing | Ford | 1:45.570 | 76.999 |
| 21 | 3 | Casey Carden | Mullins Racing | Ford | 1:47.723 | 75.460 |
| 22 | 01 | D. L. Wilson | Fast Track Racing | Ford | 1:49.898 | 73.967 |
| 23 | 03 | Rita Thomason | Clubb Racing Inc. | Chevrolet | 1:53.048 | 71.906 |
| 24 | 27 | Con Nicolopoulos | Richmond Motorsports | Chevrolet | 2:00.461 | 67.481 |
| 25 | 48 | Brad Smith | Brad Smith Motorsports | Chevrolet | 2:15.176 | 60.135 |
Official practice/qualifying results

== Race results ==
| Fin. | St | # | Driver | Team | Make | Laps | Led | Status | Pts |
|---|---|---|---|---|---|---|---|---|---|
| 1 | 8 | 17 | Taylor Gray | David Gilliland Racing | Ford | 42 | 3 | Running | 47 |
| 2 | 4 | 15 | Parker Chase | Venturini Motorsports | Toyota | 42 | 1 | Running | 43 |
| 3 | 2 | 18 | Sammy Smith (R) | Kyle Busch Motorsports | Toyota | 42 | 1 | Running | 42 |
| 4 | 1 | 55 | John Hunter Nemechek | Venturini Motorsports | Toyota | 42 | 31 | Running | 42 |
| 5 | 9 | 20 | Jesse Love (R) | Venturini Motorsports | Toyota | 42 | 0 | Running | 39 |
| 6 | 7 | 42 | Kris Wright | Cook Racing Technologies | Chevrolet | 42 | 3 | Running | 39 |
| 7 | 14 | 11 | Stanton Barrett | Fast Track Racing | Toyota | 42 | 0 | Running | 37 |
| 8 | 11 | 43 | Daniel Dye (R) | GMS Racing | Chevrolet | 41 | 0 | Running | 36 |
| 9 | 5 | 6 | Rajah Caruth (R) | Rev Racing | Chevrolet | 40 | 0 | Running | 35 |
| 10 | 10 | 32 | Dale Quarterley | 1/4 Ley Racing | Chevrolet | 40 | 0 | Running | 34 |
| 11 | 3 | 2 | Nick Sanchez | Rev Racing | Chevrolet | 40 | 3 | Running | 34 |
| 12 | 12 | 35 | Greg Van Alst | Greg Van Alst Motorsports | Ford | 40 | 0 | Running | 32 |
| 13 | 15 | 25 | Toni Breidinger (R) | Venturini Motorsports | Toyota | 40 | 0 | Running | 31 |
| 14 | 17 | 10 | Arnout Kok | Fast Track Racing | Toyota | 38 | 0 | Running | 30 |
| 15 | 18 | 30 | Amber Balcaen (R) | Rette Jones Racing | Ford | 35 | 0 | Running | 29 |
| 16 | 20 | 7 | Ed Bull | Bull Racing | Ford | 35 | 0 | Running | 28 |
| 17 | 6 | 91 | Colby Howard | Bill McAnally Racing | Toyota | 32 | 0 | Accident | 27 |
| 18 | 13 | 99 | Blaine Perkins | Bill McAnally Racing | Toyota | 27 | 0 | Brakes | 26 |
| 19 | 23 | 03 | Rita Thomason | Clubb Racing Inc. | Chevrolet | 27 | 0 | Mechanical | 25 |
| 20 | 19 | 12 | Tony Cosentino | Fast Track Racing | Toyota | 8 | 0 | Transmission | 24 |
| 21 | 22 | 01 | D. L. Wilson | Fast Track Racing | Chevrolet | 5 | 0 | Brakes | 23 |
| 22 | 25 | 48 | Brad Smith | Brad Smith Motorsports | Chevrolet | 3 | 0 | Ignition | 22 |
| 23 | 21 | 3 | Casey Carden | Mullins Racing | Ford | 0 | 0 | Did Not Start | 21 |
| 24 | 24 | 27 | Con Nicolopoulos | Richmond Motorsports | Chevrolet | 0 | 0 | Did Not Start | 20 |
| 25 | 16 | 21 | Jack Wood | Bill McAnally Racing | Toyota | 0 | 0 | Did Not Start | 19 |
Official race results

== Standings after the race ==
Drivers' Championship standings

| | Pos | Driver | Points |
|---|---|---|---|
| | 1 | Rajah Caruth | 390 |
| | 2 | Nick Sanchez | 384 (-6) |
| | 3 | Daniel Dye | 382 (-8) |
| | 4 | Toni Breidinger | 332 (-58) |
| | 5 | Greg Van Alst | 329 (-61) |
| | 6 | Amber Balcaen | 319 (-71) |
| 1 | 7 | Brad Smith | 267 (-123) |
| 1 | 8 | Zachary Tinkle | 248 (-142) |
| | 9 | Sammy Smith | 226 (-164) |
| | 10 | D. L. Wilson | 203 (-187) |

- Note: Only the first 10 positions are included for the driver standings.

| Previous race: 2022 Menards 250 | ARCA Menards Series; 2022 season | Next race: 2022 General Tire Delivers 200 |
