= Ed Bull =

American stock car racer

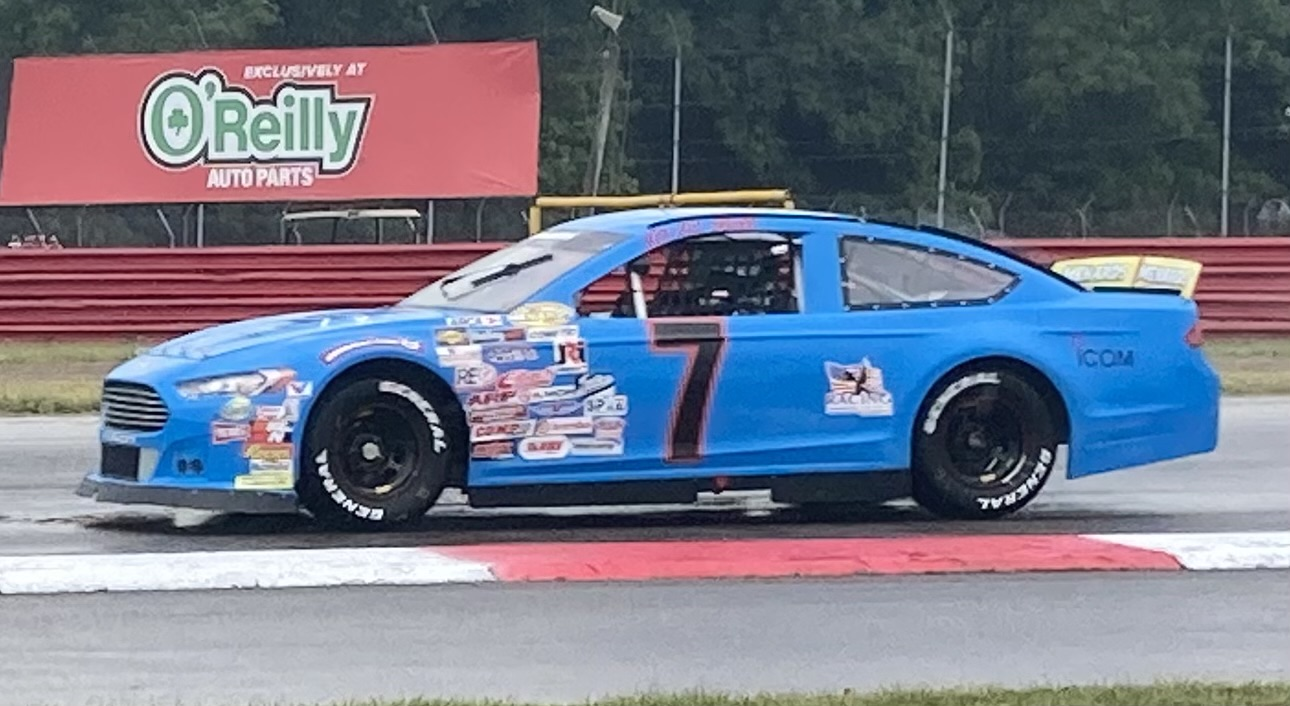
- Bull's No. 7 ARCA car at Mid-Ohio in 2022
- Born: William Edward Bull III; Chapin, South Carolina

ARCA Menards Series career
- 10 races run over 9 years
- Best finish: 63rd (2022)
- First race: 2008 Loud Energy Drink 150 (New Jersey Motorsports Park)
- Last race: 2022 General Tire Delivers 100 (Watkins Glen)
Wins	Top tens	Poles
0	0	0
- Statistics up to date as of May 15, 2023.

William Edward Bull III is an American professional stock car racing driver who most recently competed part-time in the ARCA Menards Series, driving the No. 7 Ford Fusion for CCM Racing. He has competed in the series as a road course ringer since 2008. He works as a chiropractor in Cape Charles, Virginia.

== Racing career ==
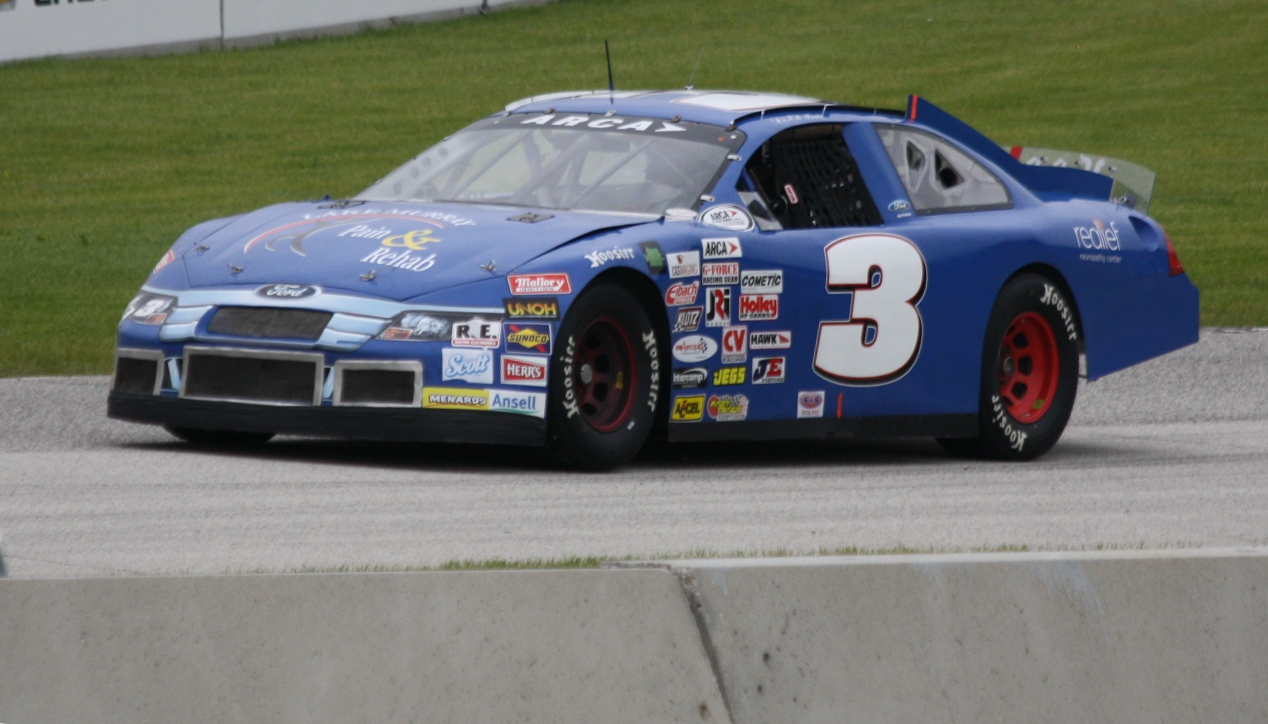
Bull's No. 3 ARCA car at Road America.

In 2008, Bull made his debut in the ARCA Re/Max Series at New Jersey Motorsports Park, driving his self-owned No. 97 Ford, where he started 39th and finished multiple laps down in 32nd. He then made another start at New Jersey the following year, this time driving the No. 7, where he qualified in nineteenth but went on to finish 27th due to suspension issues. In 2010, he made a start at Palm Beach International Raceway, where he started and finished in 23rd, whilst also making another start at New Jersey, where he qualified in 23rd and finished in sixteenth. Between 2011 and 2012, Bull finished in the top-twenty in both New Jersey events, getting a best finish of sixteenth in the latter year. In 2013, Bull made a start at Road America, where he started in sixteenth but finished in eighteenth due to suffering transmission issues halfway through the race. He also made another start at New Jersey, where he started in sixteenth and finished two laps down in fourteenth place.

After a seven year absence from the series, Bull made a return to the now ARCA Menards Series at Watkins Glen International, driving his self-owned No. 77 Ford. Unfortunately, he would not start the race and would be classified in 29th place.

Bull ran the two road course races on the 2022 main ARCA schedule, Mid-Ohio and Watkins Glen, driving the No. 7 car for CCM Racing. He finished sixteenth at the Mid-Ohio Sports Car Course and 21st at Watkins Glen International.

== Personal life ==
Bull lives in Cape Charles, Virginia and works as a chiropractor and neuropathy researcher. He graduated from Life University with a doctor of chiropractic in 1997.

== Motorsports career results ==
=== ARCA Menards Series ===
(key) (Bold – Pole position awarded by qualifying time. Italics – Pole position earned by points standings or practice time. * – Most laps led.)

ARCA Menards Series results
Year	Team	No.	Make	1	2	3	4	5	6	7	8	9	10	11	12	13	14	15	16	17	18	19	20	21	AMSC	Pts	Ref
2008	Bull Racing	97	Ford	DAY	SLM	IOW	KAN	CAR	KEN	TOL	POC	MCH	CAY	KEN	BLN	POC	NSH	ISF	DSF	CHI	SLM	NJE; 32	TAL	TOL	143rd	70	
2009	Bull Racing	7	Ford	DAY	SLM	CAR	TAL	KEN	TOL	POC	MCH	MFD	IOW	KEN	BLN	POC	ISF	CHI	TOL	DSF	NJE; 27	SLM	KAN	CAR	142nd	95	
2010	Bull Racing	28	Ford	DAY	PBE; 23	SLM	TEX	TAL	TOL	POC	MCH	IOW	MFD	POC	BLN	NJE; 16	ISF	CHI	DSF	TOL	SLM	KAN	CAR		72nd	265	
2011	Bull Racing	28	Ford	DAY	TAL	SLM	TOL	NJE; 20	CHI	POC	MCH	WIN	BLN	IOW	IRP	POC	ISF	MAD	DSF	SLM	KAN	TOL			128th	130	
2012	Bull Racing	3	Ford	DAY	MOB	SLM	TAL	TOL	ELK	POC	MCH	WIN	NJE; 16	IOW	CHI	IRP	POC	BLN	ISF	MAD	SLM	DSF	KAN		109th	150	
2013	Bull Racing	3	Ford	DAY	MOB	SLM	TAL	TOL	ELK	POC	MCH	ROA; 18	WIN	CHI	NJE; 14	POC	BLN	ISF	MAD	DSF	IOW	SLM	KEN	KAN	76th	300	
2016	Hixson Motorsports	3	Chevy	DAY	NSH	SLM	TAL	TOL	NJE; Wth	POC	MCH	MAD	WIN	IOW	IRP	POC	BLN	ISF	DSF	SLM	CHI	KEN	KAN		N/A	0	
2021	Bull Racing	77	Ford	DAY	PHO	TAL	KAN	TOL	CLT	MOH	POC	ELK	BLN	IOW	WIN	GLN; 29	MCH	ISF	MLW	DSF	BRI	SLM	KAN		118th	3	
2022	CCM Racing	7	Ford	DAY	PHO	TAL	KAN	CLT	IOW	BLN	ELK	MOH; 16	POC	IRP	MCH	GLN; 21	ISF	MLW	DSF	KAN	BRI	SLM	TOL		63rd	51	
