= Dallas Frueh =

American racing driver

- Born: Dallas Frueh; October 26, 2000 (age 26); North Aurora, Illinois, U.S.

ARCA Menards Series career
- 7 races run over 2 years
- Best finish: 38th (2022)
- First race: 2022 Zinsser SmartCoat 200 (Berlin)
- Last race: 2023 Southern Illinois 100 (DuQuoin)
Wins	Top tens	Poles
0	0	0

ARCA Menards Series East career
- 3 races run over 1 year
- Best finish: 21s (2023)
- First race: 2023 Pensacola (Pensacola)
- Last race: 2023 Sprecher 150 (Milwaukee)
Wins	Top tens	Poles
0	0	0
- Statistics up to date as of January 16, 2025.

Dallas Frueh (born October 26, 2000) is an American professional stock car racing driver. He last competed part-time in the ARCA Menards Series, driving the Nos. 11/12 Ford and No. 01 Toyota for Fast Track Racing and part-time in the ARCA Menards Series East, driving the No. 01 Ford/Toyota for the same team.

== Racing career ==
From 2019 to 2021, Frueh made select starts in the CRA Super Stock Series, earning four top-tens in the series, with a best finish of ninth at both Anderson Speedway and Lucas Oil Indianapolis Raceway Park in 2019.

In 2022, Frueh would make his ARCA Menards Series debut at Berlin Raceway driving the No. 27 Chevrolet for Richmond Motorsports, where he would finish 16th due to electrical problems. He would run the next race at Elko Speedway, where he would finish 20th and last after three laps due to mechanical issues. He would not make another start until Michigan Speedway, where he would drive the No. 01 Chevrolet for Fast Track Racing, a team that Frueh had worked for as a crew member. He would finish 20th due to engine issues. He would then make a start at the Illinois State Fairgrounds for the team, this time driving a Ford, where he would finish 20th due to transmission issues.

In 2023, Frueh would make his debut in the ARCA Menards Series East at the season opening race at Five Flags Speedway, once again driving for Fast Track, where he would finish 12th due to overheating issues. He would also run the race at Flat Rock, as well as the combination race with the main series at the Milwaukee Mile. Additionally, he ran both ARCA Menards Series dirt races, finishing 17th at both Springfield and DuQuoin.

== Personal life ==
Frueh is currently a student at the University of Northwestern Ohio.

== Motorsports career results ==
=== ARCA Menards Series ===
ARCA Menards Series results
Year	Team	No.	Make	1	2	3	4	5	6	7	8	9	10	11	12	13	14	15	16	17	18	19	20	AMSC	Pts	Ref
2022	Richmond Motorsports	27	Chevy	DAY	PHO	TAL	KAN	CLT	IOW	BLN; 16	ELK; 20	MOH	POC	IRP										38th	100	
2022	Fast Track Racing	01	Chevy												MCH; 20	GLN								38th	100	
2022	Fast Track Racing	01	Ford														ISF; 20	MLW	DSF	KAN	BRI	SLM	TOL	38th	100	
2023	Fast Track Racing	12	Ford	DAY	PHO	TAL	KAN	CLT	BLN	ELK	MOH	IOW	POC	MCH	IRP	GLN	ISF; 17							51st	76	
2023	Fast Track Racing	01	Toyota															MLW; 22						51st	76	
2023	Fast Track Racing	11	Ford																DSF; 17	KAN	BRI	SLM	TOL	51st	76	

==== ARCA Menards Series East ====
ARCA Menards Series East results
Year	Team	No.	Make	1	2	3	4	5	6	7	8	AMSEC	Pts	Ref
2023	Fast Track Racing	01	Ford	FIF; 12	DOV	NSV	FRS; 15	IOW	IRP			21st	83	
2023	Fast Track Racing	01	Toyota							MLW; 22	BRI	21st	83	

^{*} Season still in progress
