= Mamba Smith =

American racing driver (born 1992)

Dylan "Mamba" Smith
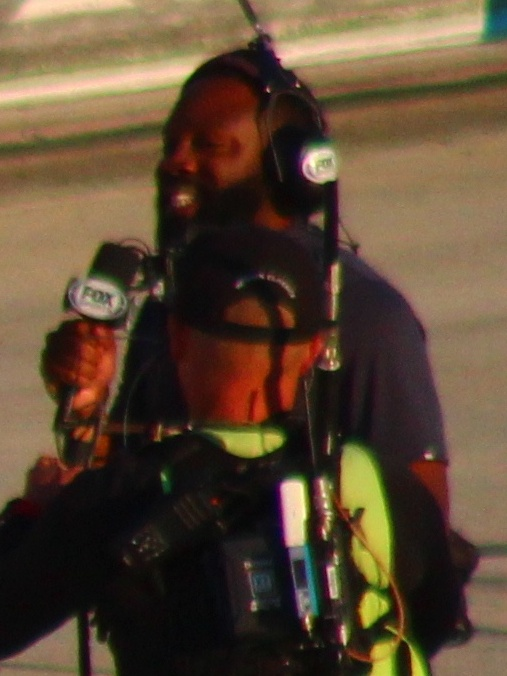
- Smith at Dover Motor Speedway in 2024
- Born: Dylan Smith; June 9, 1992 (age 34); Randolph, Vermont, U.S.
- Achievements: 2008 Allison Legacy Race Series North Champion

ARCA Menards Series career
- 2 races run over 2 years
- Best finish: 84th (2023)
- First race: 2022 Reese's 200 (IRP)
- Last race: 2023 Shore Lunch 200 (Toledo)
Wins	Top tens	Poles
0	2	0

ARCA Menards Series West career
- 1 race run over 1 year
- Best finish: 53rd (2023)
- First race: 2023 Desert Diamond Casino West Valley 100 (Phoenix)
Wins	Top tens	Poles
0	0	0
- Statistics up to date as of May 17, 2024.

Dylan "Mamba" Smith (born June 9, 1992) is an American social media personality, commentator, and racing driver of Haitian descent. He currently works as an analyst for NASCAR.com (where he is mostly known for his unofficial role as the "Chief Hype Officer of NASCAR") and NASCAR on Fox. As a driver, he has competed in late model racing and part-time in the ARCA Menards Series.

== Racing career ==
=== Early career ===
Smith would get a head start in racing at the age of four, after his father purchased him a go-kart due to his love for Thunder Road International SpeedBowl, his home track growing up. He and his father would win up to 100 go-kart races together, which grew Smith's love for racing. After years of running go-karts, Smith would begin driving in the Allison Legacy Race Series North in 2006, in which he won the championship in 2008.

=== Late models ===
In 2008, Smith began racing late models locally at Thunder Road and Airborne Speedway in New York. In 2011, he was invited by Rev Racing to attend the team's NASCAR Drive for Diversity combine in North Carolina. Smith performed decently in his first season, but was not offered a role in their development program. He attempted to receive the role a year later, but was denied a spot on the team. He was later offered a job as a mechanic for the team, in which he accepted, working with future NASCAR Cup Series champion Kyle Larson, who ended up winning the K&N Pro Series East title that year. Along with working as a mechanic, he ran ten races in the 2012 Summer Shootout at Charlotte Motor Speedway, earning seven top tens and two top-fives.

Smith left Rev Racing after the 2013 season and accepted a job with Stewart–Haas Racing for 2014. During the summer, he joined Buzze Racing to run select races in the NASCAR Whelen All-American Series at Anderson Motor Speedway. Because of his job at SHR, he received sponsorship from Haas Automation for his late model efforts.

He left SHR after 2014 and would ultimately be accepted into Rev Racing's Drive for Diversity program in the class of 2015. That year, he ran late models at Hickory Motor Speedway and New Smyrna Speedway. He eventually accepted a job at MDM Motorsports in 2017 as a communication director; for which he was the public relations assistant for Bubba Wallace, who won the truck series race at Michigan International Speedway later in the year. After MDM shut down operations following the 2018 season, he would be left without a job in NASCAR.

After not running any races for nearly five years, he returned to late model racing in 2020, running a CARS Tour event at Hickory, finishing tenth after starting twelfth. On November 21, 2021, it was announced that Smith would attempt to make his third start in the Snowflake 100, driving the 34 for Bryan Rogers Racing. He would end up failing to qualify. The following year, he competed in the South Carolina 400 for Dodge Mopar Motorsports at Florence Motor Speedway, failing to qualify. A year later, he ran a CARS Tour race at Tri-County Motor Speedway for Huffman Racing, he started seventeenth and finished fourteenth.

=== ARCA Series ===
In 2015, it was rumored that Smith would make his ARCA Racing Series debut late in the season, but the deal would ultimately fall through. On July 21, 2022, it was announced that Smith would make his official ARCA Menards Series debut at the Lucas Oil Indianapolis Raceway Park, driving the 02 car for Young's Motorsports. Smith ran inside the top-ten for a majority of the race, finishing ninth after starting 8th.

On September 29, 2023, Smith announced that he would return to Young's Motorsports, running the ARCA Menards Series West race at Phoenix Raceway in November. On October 4, he announced that he would drive the No. 15 Toyota for Venturini Motorsports at Toledo Speedway. He finished the race in ninth, four laps down due to an on-track incident with Jon Garrett.

=== Media career ===
Since 2021, Smith has served as an analyst for NASCAR.com, having the unofficial role of "Chief Hype Officer" of NASCAR, conducting interviews with drivers and running some of NASCAR's social media work. He also is an analyst for the NASCAR YouTube show, Backseat Drivers, and the co-host of Mark, Mamba and The Mayor, a podcast that features former drivers Mark Martin and Jeff Burton.

Smith made his debut as a pit reporter with NASCAR on Fox in the 2024 ARCA race at Dover Motor Speedway. He has also appeared on Fox's Kevin Harvick's Happy Hour podcast alongside Kevin Harvick himself as well as Kaitlyn Vincie in 2024. He also appears in TruTV/TNT Sports' television show NASCAR Inside The Playoffs.

== Personal life ==
Smith was born on June 9, 1992, and was adopted shortly after birth. He and his family moved to Randolph, Vermont at a young age, where he spent most of his life. Smith would earn the nickname "Black Mamba" after go-karting with a group of friends, in which he chose it as his racer name. He was a fan of Tony Stewart growing up, and also played basketball and kickball in high school. Smith has frequently used the number 34 for his late model races as a tribute to Wendell Scott, the first African-American driver to win a race in NASCAR's top premier series. He is close friends with fellow drivers Bubba Wallace and Ryan Blaney.

== Motorsports career results ==
=== ARCA Menards Series ===
(key) (Bold – Pole position awarded by qualifying time. Italics – Pole position earned by points standings or practice time. * – Most laps led.)

ARCA Menards Series results
Year	Team	No.	Make	1	2	3	4	5	6	7	8	9	10	11	12	13	14	15	16	17	18	19	20	AMSC	Pts	Ref
2022	Young's Motorsports	02	Chevy	DAY	PHO	TAL	KAN	CLT	IOW	BLN	ELK	MOH	POC	IRP; 9	MCH	GLN	ISF	MLW	DSF	KAN	BRI	SLM	TOL	85th	35	
2023	Venturini Motorsports	15	Toyota	DAY	PHO	TAL	KAN	CLT	BLN	ELK	MOH	IOW	POC	MCH	IRP	GLN	ISF	MLW	DSF	KAN	BRI	SLM	TOL; 9	84th	35	

==== ARCA Menards Series West ====
ARCA Menards Series West results
Year	Team	No.	Make	1	2	3	4	5	6	7	8	9	10	11	12	AMSWC	Pts	Ref
2023	Young's Motorsports	02	Chevy	PHO	IRW	KCR	PIR	SON	IRW	SHA	EVG	AAS	LVS	MAD	PHO; 15	53rd	29	

=== CARS Super Late Model Tour ===
(key)

CARS Super Late Model Tour results
Year	Team	No.	Make	1	2	3	4	5	6	7	8	CSLMTC	Pts	Ref
2020	Mark Reedy	21S	Ford	SNM	HCY	JEN	HCY; 10	FCS	BRI	FLC	NSH	27th	23	

=== CARS Pro Late Model Tour ===
(key)

CARS Pro Late Model Tour results
Year	Team	No.	Make	1	2	3	4	5	6	7	8	9	10	11	12	13	CPLMTC	Pts	Ref
2023	N/A	75	Chevy	SNM	HCY	ACE	NWS	TCM; 14	DIL	CRW	WKS	HCY	TCM	SBO	TCM	CRW	48th	26	

Sporting positions
Preceded by Anthony Frissora	Allison Legacy Series North Champion; 2008	Succeeded by James Logan
