= 2023 Menards 250 =

7th race of the 2023 ARCA Menards Series

Race details
- Race 7 of 20 of the 2023 ARCA Menards Series
- Date: June 24, 2023
- Official name: 8th Annual Menards 250
- Location: Elko Speedway, Elko New Market, Minnesota
- Course: Permanent racing facility
- Course length: 0.604 km (0.375 miles)
- Distance: 250 laps, 93 mi (150 km)
- Scheduled distance: 250 laps, 93 mi (150 km)
- Average speed: 59.671 mph (96.031 km/h)

Pole position
Driver	William Sawalich	Joe Gibbs Racing
- Grid positions set by competition-based formula

Most laps led
Driver	Jesse Love	Venturini Motorsports
- Laps: 235

Winner
No. 20	Jesse Love	Venturini Motorsports

Television in the United States
- Network: FS2
- Announcers: Brent Stover and Phil Parsons

Radio in the United States
- Radio: ARCA Racing Network

The 2023 Menards 250 was the 7th stock car race of the 2023 ARCA Menards Series season, and the 8th iteration of the event. The race was held on Saturday, June 24, 2023, in Elko New Market, Minnesota at Elko Speedway, a 0.375 mile (0.604 km) permanent oval shaped racetrack. The race took the scheduled 250 laps to complete. In a wild and controversial race that had an exciting battle between Jesse Love and William Sawalich, Jesse Love, driving for Venturini Motorsports, would hold off a fast-charging Sawalich in the final 20 laps of the race to earn his sixth career ARCA Menards Series win, and his fourth of the season. Love dominated the entire race as well, leading 235 of the 250 laps. Sawalich, who started on pole, led 15 laps of the race until getting spun by Sean Hingorani on lap 150. To fill out the podium, Sawalich, driving for Joe Gibbs Racing, and Hingorani, driving for Venturini Motorsports, would finish 2nd and 3rd, respectively.

== Background ==
Elko Speedway, is a 3/8 mile asphalt oval NASCAR-sanctioned race track located in Elko New Market, Minnesota. Elko Speedway is a track in the NASCAR Advance Auto Parts Weekly Series. The track is located in the former Elko portion of the merged city.

=== Entry list ===
- (R) denotes rookie driver.

#	Driver	Team	Make	Sponsor
01	Davey Callihan	Fast Track Racing	Toyota	CW Metals
2	Andrés Pérez de Lara (R)	Rev Racing	Chevrolet	Max Siegel Inc.
03	Casey Carden	Clubb Racing Inc.	Ford	Clubb Racing Inc.
06	A. J. Moyer	Wayne Peterson Racing	Toyota	River's Edge Cottages & Park
10	Willie Mullins	Fast Track Racing	Ford	CW Metals
11	Bryce Haugeberg	Fast Track Racing	Ford	Haugeberg Farms, UTI
12	Ryan Roulette	Fast Track Racing	Ford	VFW, Bellator Recruiting Academy
15	Sean Hingorani	Venturini Motorsports	Toyota	Yahoo!, Mobil 1
18	William Sawalich	Joe Gibbs Racing	Toyota	Starkey, SoundGear
20	Jesse Love	Venturini Motorsports	Toyota	JBL
25	Conner Jones	Venturini Motorsports	Toyota	Jones Utilities
30	Frankie Muniz (R)	Rette Jones Racing	Ford	ReSkills
31	Rita Goulet	Rise Motorsports	Chevrolet	DNA Collision & Repair
32	Christian Rose (R)	AM Racing	Ford	West Virginia Tourism
43	Jalen Mack	Tamayo Cosentino Racing	Chevrolet	Tamayo Cosentino Racing
45	Tony Cosentino	Tamayo Cosentino Racing	Ford	Tamayo Cosentino Racing
48	Brad Smith	Brad Smith Motorsports	Chevrolet	Copraya.com
55	Toni Breidinger	Venturini Motorsports	Toyota	Venturini Motorsports
66	Jon Garrett (R)	Veer Motorsports	Chevrolet	Venture Foods
Official entry list

== Practice ==
The first and only practice session was held on Saturday, June 24, at 3:40 PM CST, and would last for 20 minutes. William Sawalich, driving for Joe Gibbs Racing, would set the fastest time in the session, with a lap of 14.439, and an average speed of 93.497 mph (150.469 km/h). A second session was scheduled to be held at 4:10 PM CST, but was cancelled due to inclement weather.

Pos.	#	Driver	Team	Make	Time	Speed
1	18	William Sawalich	Joe Gibbs Racing	Toyota	14.439	93.497
2	20	Jesse Love	Venturini Motorsports	Toyota	14.690	91.899
3	25	Conner Jones	Venturini Motorsports	Toyota	14.707	91.793
Full practice results

== Qualifying ==
Qualifying was scheduled to be held on Saturday, June 24, at 5:20 PM CST. The qualifying system used is a single-car, two-lap system with only one round. Whoever sets the fastest time in that round wins the pole. Qualifying was cancelled due to inclement weather. The starting lineup would be determined by practice speeds. As a result, William Sawalich, driving for Joe Gibbs Racing, would earn the pole.

Pos.	#	Driver	Team	Make
1	18	William Sawalich	Joe Gibbs Racing	Toyota
2	20	Jesse Love	Venturini Motorsports	Toyota
3	25	Conner Jones	Venturini Motorsports	Toyota
4	15	Sean Hingorani	Venturini Motorsports	Toyota
5	30	Frankie Muniz (R)	Rette Jones Racing	Ford
6	10	Willie Mullins	Fast Track Racing	Ford
7	55	Toni Breidinger	Venturini Motorsports	Toyota
8	01	Davey Callihan	Fast Track Racing	Toyota
9	2	Andrés Pérez de Lara (R)	Rev Racing	Chevrolet
10	32	Christian Rose (R)	AM Racing	Ford
11	66	Jon Garrett (R)	Veer Motorsports	Chevrolet
12	06	A. J. Moyer	Wayne Peterson Racing	Toyota
13	11	Bryce Haugeberg	Fast Track Racing	Ford
14	03	Casey Carden	Clubb Racing Inc.	Ford
15	12	Ryan Roulette	Fast Track Racing	Ford
16	31	Rita Goulet	Rise Motorsports	Chevrolet
17	48	Brad Smith	Brad Smith Motorsports	Chevrolet
18	43	Jalen Mack	Tamayo Cosentino Racing	Chevrolet
19	45	Tony Cosentino	Tamayo Cosentino Racing	Ford
Official starting lineup

== Race results ==
Fin	St	#	Driver	Team	Make	Laps	Led	Status	Pts
1	2	20	Jesse Love	Venturini Motorsports	Toyota	250	235	Running	48
2	1	18	William Sawalich	Joe Gibbs Racing	Toyota	250	15	Running	44
3	4	15	Sean Hingorani	Venturini Motorsports	Toyota	250	0	Running	41
4	3	25	Conner Jones	Venturini Motorsports	Toyota	250	0	Running	40
5	9	2	Andrés Pérez de Lara (R)	Rev Racing	Chevrolet	250	0	Running	39
6	8	01	Davey Callihan	Fast Track Racing	Toyota	250	0	Running	38
7	18	45	Tony Cosentino	Tamayo Cosentino Racing	Ford	249	0	Running	37
8	6	10	Willie Mullins	Fast Track Racing	Ford	249	0	Running	36
9	7	55	Toni Breidinger	Venturini Motorsports	Toyota	248	0	Running	35
10	10	32	Christian Rose (R)	AM Racing	Ford	246	0	Running	34
11	11	66	Jon Garrett (R)	Veer Motorsports	Chevrolet	242	0	Running	33
12	15	12	Ryan Roulette	Fast Track Racing	Ford	240	0	Running	32
13	13	11	Bryce Haugeberg	Fast Track Racing	Ford	233	0	Running	31
14	16	31	Rita Goulet	Rise Motorsports	Chevrolet	217	0	Running	30
15	12	06	A. J. Moyer	Wayne Peterson Racing	Toyota	216	0	Running	29
16	5	30	Frankie Muniz (R)	Rette Jones Racing	Ford	199	0	Accident	28
17	14	03	Casey Carden	Clubb Racing Inc.	Ford	113	0	Valve	27
18	17	48	Brad Smith	Brad Smith Motorsports	Chevrolet	3	0	Throttle	26
19	19	43	Jalen Mack	Tamayo Cosentino Racing	Chevrolet	0	0	Fuel Pump	25
Official race results

== Standings after the race ==
Drivers' Championship standings

	Pos	Driver	Points
	1	Jesse Love	340
	2	Frankie Muniz	296 (-44)
	3	Andrés Pérez de Lara	288 (-52)
1	4	Tony Cosentino	276 (-64)
1	5	Christian Rose	273 (-67)
	6	Toni Breidinger	264 (-76)
1	7	Jon Garrett	238 (-102)
1	8	Jack Wood	214 (-126)
1	9	A. J. Moyer	213 (-127)
1	10	Brad Smith	202 (-138)

- Note: Only the first 10 positions are included for the driver standings.

Previous race: 2023 Herr's Snacks 200	ARCA Menards Series; 2023 season	Next race: 2023 Zinsser SmartCoat 150
