= 2023 Shore Lunch 200 =

20th race of the 2023 ARCA Menards Series

2023 Shore Lunch 200 presented by CGS Imaging
Race details
- Race 20 of 20 of the 2023 ARCA Menards Series
- Date: October 7, 2023
- Official name: 2nd Annual Shore Lunch 200 presented by CGS Imaging
- Location: Toledo Speedway, Toledo, Ohio
- Course: Permanent racing facility
- Course length: 0.5 miles (0.804 km)
- Distance: 200 laps, 100 mi (161 km)
- Scheduled distance: 200 laps, 100 mi (161 km)
- Average speed: 69.378 mph (111.653 km/h)

Pole position
Driver	Jesse Love	Venturini Motorsports
- Time: 15.850

Most laps led
Driver	William Sawalich	Joe Gibbs Racing
- Laps: 111

Winner
No. 18	William Sawalich	Joe Gibbs Racing

Television in the United States
- Network: FS2
- Announcers: Jamie Little, Phil Parsons, and Trevor Bayne

Radio in the United States
- Radio: ARCA Racing Network

The 2023 Shore Lunch 200 presented by CGS Imaging was the 20th and final stock car race of the 2023 ARCA Menards Series season, and the 2nd iteration of the event. The race was held on Saturday, October 7, 2023, in Toledo, Ohio at Toledo Speedway, a 0.5 miles (0.804 km) permanent oval shaped racetrack. The race took the scheduled 200 laps to complete. William Sawalich, driving for Joe Gibbs Racing, would hold off a fierce battle with Jesse Love throughout the whole race, and lead a race-high 111 laps to earn his fourth career ARCA Menards Series win, and his fourth of the season. To fill out the podium, Love and Sean Hingorani, both driving for Venturini Motorsports, would finish 2nd and 3rd, respectively.

== Background ==
Toledo Speedway is a half-mile paved oval racetrack located in Toledo, Ohio, United States. It is owned jointly by Roy Mott and ARCA President Ron Drager. It is operated by ARCA and run as the sister track to Flat Rock Speedway in Flat Rock, Michigan.

=== Entry list ===
- (R) denotes rookie driver.

#	Driver	Team	Make	Sponsor
2	Andrés Pérez de Lara (R)	Rev Racing	Chevrolet	Max Siegel Inc.
03	Alex Clubb	Clubb Racing Inc.	Ford	Clubb Racing Inc.
06	Nate Moeller	Wayne Peterson Racing	Toyota	Wayne Peterson Racing
10	Tim Monroe	Fast Track Racing	Ford	Fast Track Racing
11	Darrell Basham	Fast Track Racing	Ford	Double "H" Ranch, Vampire State LLC.
12	Stephanie Moyer	Fast Track Racing	Toyota	Women's Boutique & Consignment
15	Mamba Smith	Venturini Motorsports	Toyota	Elliott's Custom Trailers & Carts
18	William Sawalich	Joe Gibbs Racing	Toyota	Starkey, SoundGear
20	Jesse Love	Venturini Motorsports	Toyota	JBL
25	Sean Hingorani	Venturini Motorsports	Toyota	GearWrench
30	Frankie Muniz (R)	Rette Jones Racing	Ford	Hearn Industrial
31	Rita Goulet	Rise Motorsports	Chevrolet	backthelane.com
32	Christian Rose (R)	AM Racing	Ford	West Virginia Tourism
48	Brad Smith	Brad Smith Motorsports	Ford	Oktoberfest Race Weekend
63	Mason Ludwig	Spraker Racing Enterprises	Chevrolet	Bell Wire, Speednut
66	Jon Garrett (R)	Veer Motorsports	Chevrolet	Fort Worth Screen Printing
69	Mike Basham	Kimmel Racing	Ford	Kimmel Racing
73	Andy Jankowiak	KLAS Motorsports	Toyota	Sbarro Pizza
Official entry list

== Practice ==
The first and only practice session was held on Saturday, October 7, at 11:45 AM EST, and would last for 45 minutes. Jesse Love, driving for Venturini Motorsports, would set the fastest time in the session, with a lap of 15.935, and an average speed of 112.959 mph (181.790 km/h).

Pos.	#	Driver	Team	Make	Time	Speed
1	20	Jesse Love	Venturini Motorsports	Toyota	15.935	112.959
2	18	William Sawalich	Joe Gibbs Racing	Toyota	15.936	112.952
3	2	Andrés Pérez de Lara (R)	Rev Racing	Chevrolet	16.194	111.152
Full practice results

== Qualifying ==
Qualifying was held on Saturday, October 7, at 1:00 PM EST. The qualifying system used is a single-car, two-lap system with only one round. Whoever sets the fastest time in that round will win the pole. Jesse Love, driving for Venturini Motorsports, would score the pole for the race, with a lap of 15.850, and an average speed of 113.565 mph (182.765 km/h).

Pos.	#	Driver	Team	Make	Time	Speed
1	20	Jesse Love	Venturini Motorsports	Toyota	15.850	113.565
2	18	William Sawalich	Joe Gibbs Racing	Toyota	15.890	113.279
3	25	Sean Hingorani	Venturini Motorsports	Toyota	16.028	112.303
4	2	Andrés Pérez de Lara (R)	Rev Racing	Chevrolet	16.262	110.687
5	73	Andy Jankowiak	KLAS Motorsports	Toyota	16.267	110.653
6	15	Mamba Smith	Venturini Motorsports	Toyota	16.301	110.423
7	32	Christian Rose (R)	AM Racing	Ford	16.340	110.159
8	30	Frankie Muniz (R)	Rette Jones Racing	Ford	16.442	109.476
9	63	Mason Ludwig	Spraker Racing Enterprises	Chevrolet	16.682	107.901
10	66	Jon Garrett (R)	Veer Motorsports	Chevrolet	16.832	106.939
11	69	Mike Basham	Kimmel Racing	Ford	17.413	103.371
12	03	Alex Clubb	Clubb Racing Inc.	Ford	17.802	101.112
13	12	Stephanie Moyer	Fast Track Racing	Toyota	18.050	99.723
14	10	Tim Monroe	Fast Track Racing	Ford	18.145	99.201
15	48	Brad Smith	Brad Smith Motorsports	Ford	18.662	96.453
16	31	Rita Goulet	Rise Motorsports	Chevrolet	18.860	95.440
17	11	Darrell Basham	Fast Track Racing	Ford	18.898	95.248
18	06	Nate Moeller	Wayne Peterson Racing	Toyota	19.521	92.208
Official qualifying results

== Race results ==
Fin	St	#	Driver	Team	Make	Laps	Led	Status	Pts
1	2	18	William Sawalich	Joe Gibbs Racing	Toyota	200	111	Running	48
2	1	20	Jesse Love	Venturini Motorsports	Toyota	200	89	Running	43
3	3	25	Sean Hingorani	Venturini Motorsports	Toyota	200	0	Running	41
4	4	2	Andrés Pérez de Lara (R)	Rev Racing	Chevrolet	200	0	Running	40
5	7	32	Christian Rose (R)	AM Racing	Ford	199	0	Running	39
6	9	63	Mason Ludwig	Spraker Racing Enterprises	Chevrolet	198	0	Running	38
7	5	73	Andy Jankowiak	KLAS Motorsports	Toyota	197	0	Running	37
8	8	30	Frankie Muniz (R)	Rette Jones Racing	Ford	196	0	Running	36
9	6	15	Mamba Smith	Venturini Motorsports	Toyota	195	0	Running	35
10	13	12	Stephanie Moyer	Fast Track Racing	Toyota	187	0	Running	34
11	12	03	Alex Clubb	Clubb Racing Inc.	Ford	183	0	Running	33
12	17	11	Darrell Basham	Fast Track Racing	Ford	180	0	Running	32
13	18	06	Nate Moeller	Wayne Peterson Racing	Toyota	177	0	Running	31
14	16	31	Rita Goulet	Rise Motorsports	Chevrolet	153	0	Mechanical	30
15	10	66	Jon Garrett (R)	Veer Motorsports	Chevrolet	141	0	Accident	29
16	15	48	Brad Smith	Brad Smith Motorsports	Ford	45	0	Brakes	28
17	11	69	Mike Basham	Kimmel Racing	Ford	11	0	Handling	27
18	14	10	Tim Monroe	Fast Track Racing	Ford	5	0	Mechanical	26
Official race results

== Standings after the race ==
Drivers' Championship standings

Pos	Driver	Points
1	Jesse Love	1,057
2	Andrés Pérez de Lara	912 (-145)
3	Christian Rose	889 (-168)
4	Frankie Muniz	860 (-197)
5	Jon Garrett	778 (-279)
6	Brad Smith	686 (-371)
7	A. J. Moyer	570 (-487)
8	William Sawalich	558 (-499)
9	Toni Breidinger	489 (-568)
10	Tim Monroe	429 (-628)

- Note: Only the first 10 positions are included for the driver standings.

Previous race: 2023 Atlas 200	ARCA Menards Series; 2023 season	Next race: 2024 Hard Rock Bet 200
