= 2023 Zinsser SmartCoat 150 =

8th race of the 2023 ARCA Menards Series

Race details
- Race 8 of 20 of the 2023 ARCA Menards Series
- Date: July 7, 2023
- Official name: 3rd Annual Zinsser SmartCoat 150
- Location: Mid-Ohio Sports Car Course, Lexington, Ohio
- Course: Permanent racing facility
- Course length: 2.258 miles (3.634 km)
- Distance: 42 laps, 94 mi (152 km)
- Scheduled distance: 42 laps, 94 mi (152 km)
- Average speed: 68.783 mph (110.696 km/h)

Pole position
Driver	Sean Hingorani	Venturini Motorsports
- Time: 1:28.439

Most laps led
Driver	Tyler Ankrum	Hattori Racing Enterprises
- Laps: 21

Winner
No. 61	Tyler Ankrum	Hattori Racing Enterprises

Television in the United States
- Network: FS1
- Announcers: Jamie Little, Phil Parsons, and Trevor Bayne

Radio in the United States
- Radio: MRN

The 2023 Zinsser SmartCoat 150 was the 8th stock car race of the 2023 ARCA Menards Series season, and the 3rd iteration of the event. The race was held on Friday, July 7, 2023, in Lexington, Ohio at Mid-Ohio Sports Car Course, a 2.258-mile (3.634 km) permanent road course. The race took the scheduled 42 laps to complete. Tyler Ankrum, driving for Hattori Racing Enterprises, would make a comeback after a late-race spin, and put on a dominating performance, leading 21 of the 42 laps, and earning his first career ARCA Menards Series win. To fill out the podium, William Sawalich, driving for Joe Gibbs Racing, and Jack Wood, driving for Rev Racing, would finish 2nd and 3rd, respectively.

The race was noted following a last lap altercation between Venturini Motorsports teammates Sean Hingorani and Dean Thompson. With eight laps to go, Thompson would shove Hingorani into the grass in turn 13, causing Hingorani to spin down the frontstretch. On the final lap, Hingorani attempted to force Thompson into the grass in turn 9, and would cause both of them to get stuck in the sand trap. Thompson was running second at the time, while Hingorani was a lap down outside the top 10. Thompson and Hingorani would end up finishing 10th and 13th in the race.

== Background ==
Mid-Ohio Sports Car Course is a road course auto racing facility located in Troy Township, Morrow County, Ohio, United States, just outside the village of Lexington. Mid-Ohio has also colloquially become a term for the entire north-central region of the state, from south of Sandusky to the north of Columbus. It hosts a number of racing series such as IndyCar, IMSA WeatherTech Sportscar Championship, and the NASCAR Craftsman Truck Series, along with other club events such has SCCA and National Auto Sport Association.

=== Entry list ===
- (R) denotes rookie driver.

#	Driver	Team	Make	Sponsor
0	A. J. Moyer	Wayne Peterson Racing	Toyota	River's Edge Cottages & RV Park
2	Andrés Pérez de Lara (R)	Rev Racing	Chevrolet	Max Siegel Inc.
03	Casey Carden	Clubb Racing Inc.	Ford	Bill's Speed Shop
4	Dale Quarterley	1/4 Ley Racing	Chevrolet	Van Dyk Recycling Solutions
06	Tim Richmond	Richmond Motorsports	Toyota	Circle Track Warehouse
6	Jack Wood	Rev Racing	Chevrolet	Velocity Racing
10	Tim Monroe	Fast Track Racing	Toyota	Universal Technical Institute
11	Zach Herrin	Fast Track Racing	Toyota	Lambda Legal
12	Zachary Tinkle	Fast Track Racing	Ford	HYTORC of New York
13	Todd Souza	Central Coast Racing	Ford	Central Coast Cabinets
15	Sean Hingorani	Venturini Motorsports	Toyota	Mobil 1, Yahoo!
18	William Sawalich	Joe Gibbs Racing	Toyota	Starkey, SoundGear
20	Jesse Love	Venturini Motorsports	Toyota	JBL
25	Conner Jones	Venturini Motorsports	Toyota	Jones Utilities
30	Frankie Muniz (R)	Rette Jones Racing	Ford	Muniz Racing
32	Christian Rose (R)	AM Racing	Ford	West Virginia Tourism
48	Brad Smith	Brad Smith Motorsports	Chevrolet	Copraya.com
55	Dean Thompson	Venturini Motorsports	Toyota	Thompson Pipe Group
61	Tyler Ankrum	Hattori Racing Enterprises	Toyota	LiUNA!
66	Jon Garrett (R)	Veer Motorsports	Chevrolet	Venture Foods
75	Bob Schacht	Bob Schacht Motorsports	Chevrolet	Engineered Components
Official entry list

== Practice ==
The first and only practice session was held on Friday, July 7, at 1:45 pm EST, and would last for 1 hour. Jack Wood, driving for Rev Racing, would set the fastest time in the session, with a lap of 1:29.298, and an average speed of 91.030 mph (146.499 km/h).

Pos.	#	Driver	Team	Make	Time	Speed
1	6	Jack Wood	Rev Racing	Chevrolet	1:29.298	91.030
2	61	Tyler Ankrum	Hattori Racing Enterprises	Toyota	1:29.305	91.023
3	15	Sean Hingorani	Venturini Motorsports	Toyota	1:29.661	90.661
Full practice results

== Qualifying ==
Qualifying was held on Friday, July 7, at 3:00 pm EST. The qualifying system used is a multi-car, multi-lap system with only one round. Whoever sets the fastest time in that round wins the pole. Sean Hingorani, driving for Venturini Motorsports, would score the pole for the race, with a lap of 1:28.439, and an average speed of 91.914 mph (147.921 km/h).

Pos.	#	Driver	Team	Make	Time	Speed
1	15	Sean Hingorani	Venturini Motorsports	Toyota	1:28.439	91.914
2	61	Tyler Ankrum	Hattori Racing Enterprises	Toyota	1:28.864	91.475
3	6	Jack Wood	Rev Racing	Chevrolet	1:29.218	91.176
4	18	William Sawalich	Joe Gibbs Racing	Toyota	1:29.651	90.672
5	2	Andrés Pérez de Lara (R)	Rev Racing	Chevrolet	1:29.682	90.640
6	55	Dean Thompson	Venturini Motorsports	Toyota	1:29.836	90.485
7	30	Frankie Muniz (R)	Rette Jones Racing	Ford	1:30.173	90.285
8	4	Dale Quarterley	1/4 Ley Racing	Chevrolet	1:30.691	90.268
9	25	Conner Jones	Venturini Motorsports	Toyota	1:30.638	89.684
10	13	Todd Souza	Central Coast Racing	Ford	1:31.942	89.117
11	11	Zach Herrin	Fast Track Racing	Toyota	1:33.576	86.868
12	32	Christian Rose (R)	AM Racing	Ford	1:34.301	86.201
13	66	Jon Garrett (R)	Veer Motorsports	Chevrolet	1:35.969	84.702
14	10	Tim Monroe	Fast Track Racing	Toyota	1:38.535	82.497
15	06	Tim Richmond	Richmond Motorsports	Toyota	1:39.434	81.751
16	75	Bob Schacht	Bob Schacht Motorsports	Chevrolet	1:40.555	80.839
17	0	A. J. Moyer	Wayne Peterson Racing	Toyota	2:04.816	65.126
18	48	Brad Smith	Brad Smith Motorsports	Chevrolet	2:13.653	60.820
19	20	Jesse Love	Venturini Motorsports	Toyota	–	–
20	03	Casey Carden	Clubb Racing Inc.	Ford	–	–
21	12	Zachary Tinkle	Fast Track Racing	Ford	–	–
Official qualifying results

== Race results ==
Fin	St	#	Driver	Team	Make	Laps	Led	Status	Pts
1	2	61	Tyler Ankrum	Hattori Racing Enterprises	Toyota	42	21	Running	49
2	4	18	William Sawalich	Joe Gibbs Racing	Toyota	42	0	Running	42
3	3	6	Jack Wood	Rev Racing	Chevrolet	42	0	Running	41
4	19	20	Jesse Love	Venturini Motorsports	Toyota	42	8	Running	41
5	8	4	Dale Quarterley	1/4 Ley Racing	Chevrolet	42	0	Running	39
6	7	30	Frankie Muniz (R)	Rette Jones Racing	Ford	42	0	Running	38
7	10	13	Todd Souza	Central Coast Racing	Ford	42	0	Running	37
8	9	25	Conner Jones	Venturini Motorsports	Toyota	42	0	Running	36
9	11	11	Zach Herrin	Fast Track Racing	Toyota	42	0	Running	35
10	6	55	Dean Thompson	Venturini Motorsports	Toyota	41	5	Accident	35
11	12	32	Christian Rose (R)	AM Racing	Ford	41	0	Running	33
12	13	66	Jon Garrett (R)	Veer Motorsports	Chevrolet	41	0	Running	32
13	1	15	Sean Hingorani	Venturini Motorsports	Toyota	40	0	Accident	33
14	16	75	Bob Schacht	Bob Schacht Motorsports	Chevrolet	40	0	Running	30
15	5	2	Andrés Pérez de Lara (R)	Rev Racing	Chevrolet	40	0	Running	29
16	14	10	Tim Monroe	Fast Track Racing	Toyota	17	0	Brakes	28
17	17	0	A. J. Moyer	Wayne Peterson Racing	Toyota	15	0	Vibration	27
18	20	03	Casey Carden	Clubb Racing Inc.	Ford	12	0	Accident	26
19	15	06	Tim Richmond	Richmond Motorsports	Toyota	5	0	Battery	25
20	21	12	Zachary Tinkle	Fast Track Racing	Ford	4	0	Transmission	24
21	18	48	Brad Smith	Brad Smith Motorsports	Chevrolet	1	0	Overheating	23
Official race results

== Standings after the race ==
Drivers' Championship standings

	Pos	Driver	Points
	1	Jesse Love	377
	2	Frankie Muniz	334 (-43)
	3	Andrés Pérez de Lara	317 (-60)
1	4	Christian Rose	306 (-71)
1	5	Tony Cosentino	276 (-101)
1	6	Jon Garrett	270 (-107)
1	7	Toni Breidinger	264 (-113)
	8	Jack Wood	255 (-122)
	9	A. J. Moyer	240 (-137)
	10	Brad Smith	225 (-152)

- Note: Only the first 10 positions are included for the driver standings.

Previous race: 2023 Menards 250	ARCA Menards Series; 2023 season	Next race: 2023 Calypso Lemonade 150
