= 2023 ARCA Menards Series =

71st season of the ARCA Menards Series

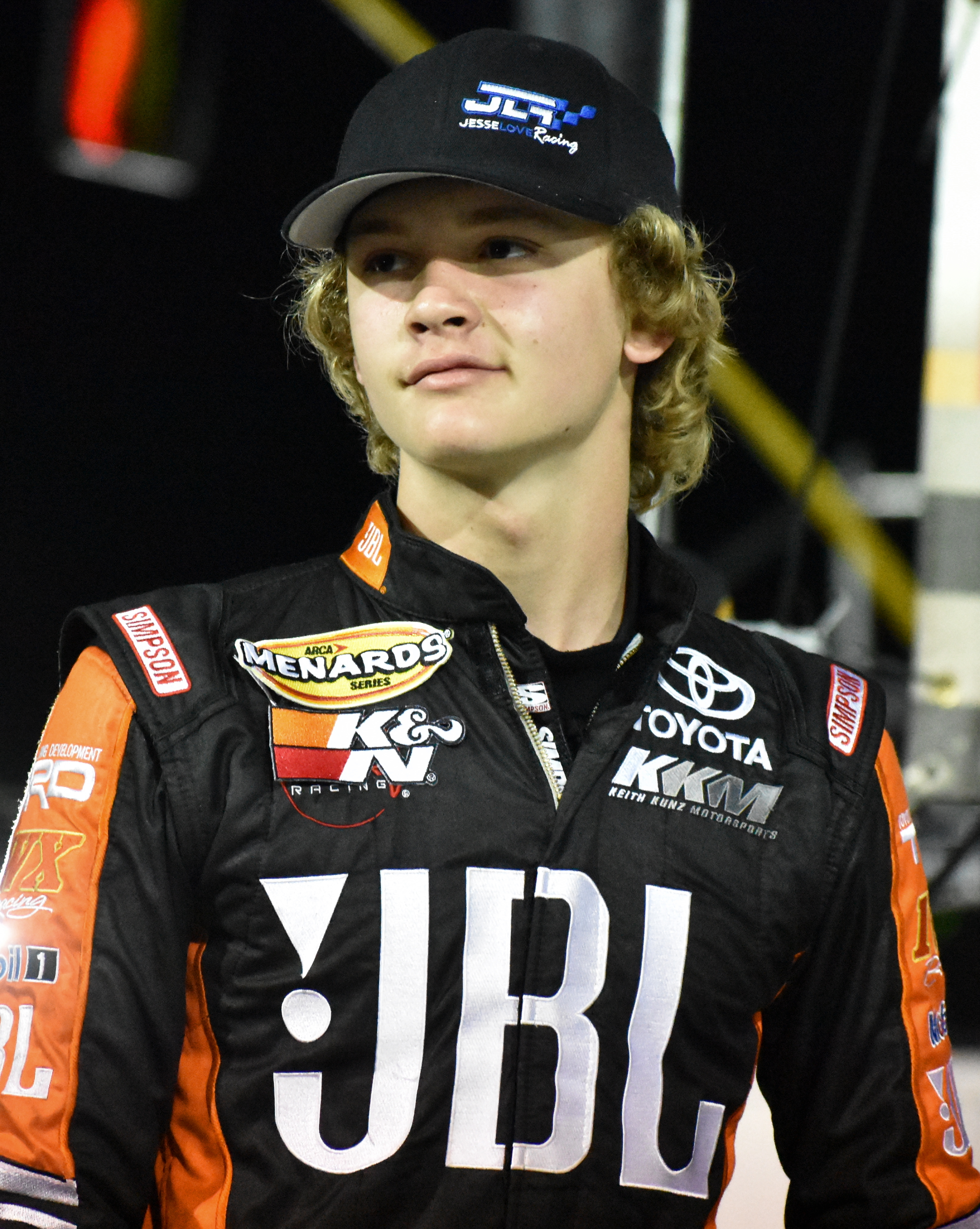
Jesse Love, the 2023 ARCA Menards Series champion.

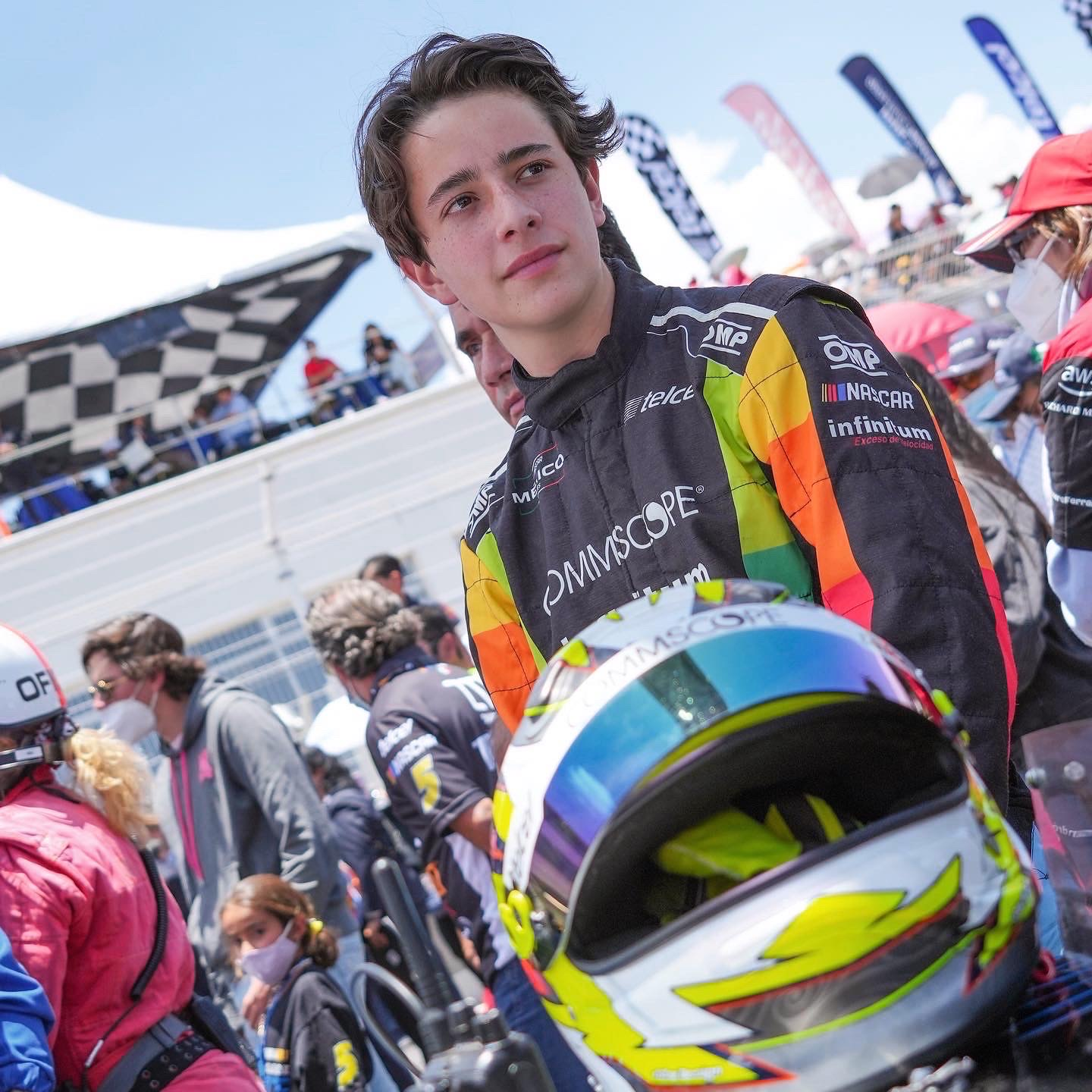
Andrés Pérez de Lara finished second behind Love in the championship by 145 points.

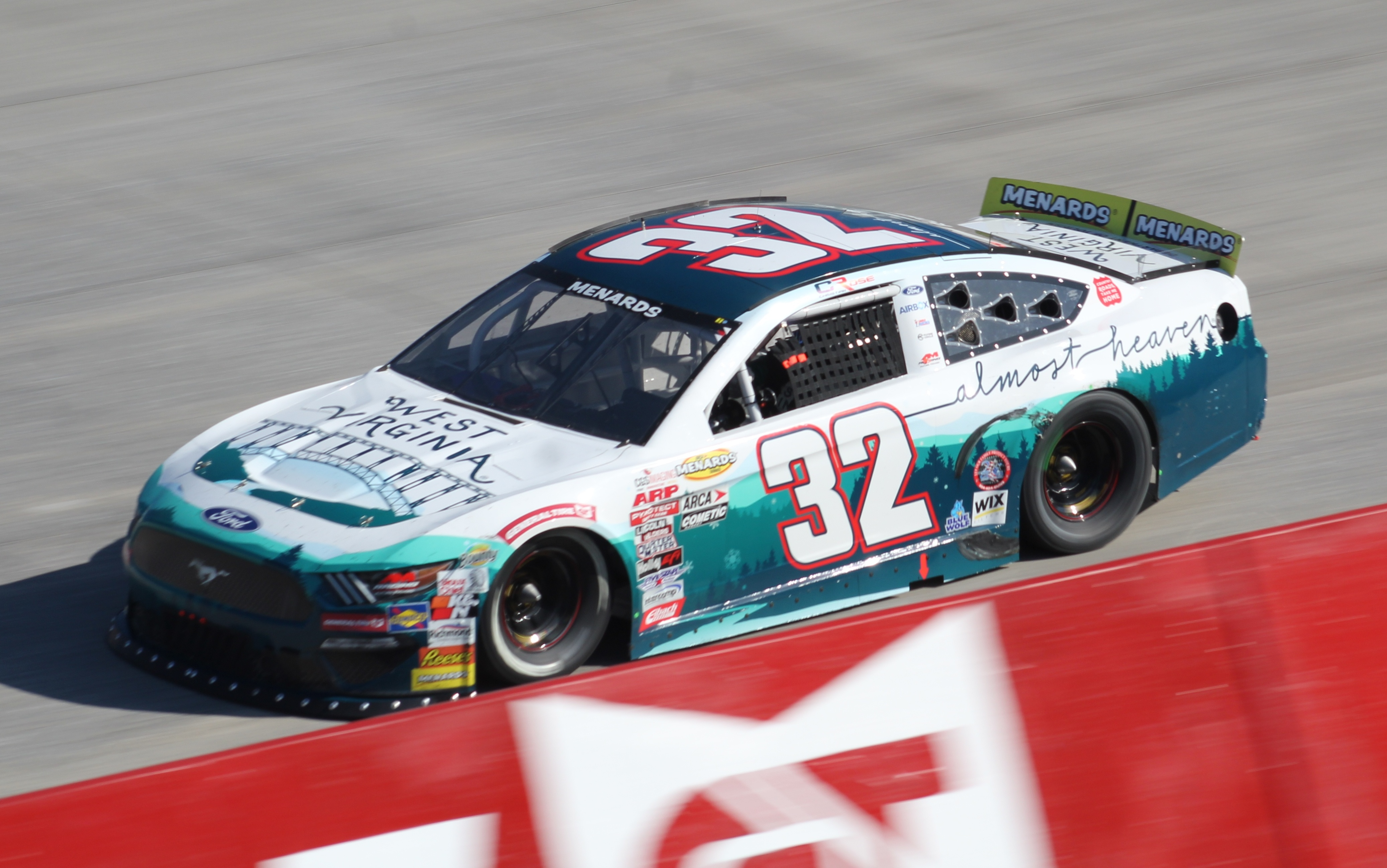
Christian Rose finished third in the championship.

The 2023 ARCA Menards Series was the 71st season of the ARCA Menards Series, a stock car racing series sanctioned by NASCAR in the United States. The season began at Daytona International Speedway with the BRANDT 200 on February 18 and ended with the Shore Lunch 200 at Toledo Speedway on October 7.

Nick Sanchez, the 2022 series champion, did not return to run full-time in the ARCA Menards Series in 2023 and defend his title as he moved up to the NASCAR Craftsman Truck Series full-time driving for Rev Racing, the same team he won the ARCA championship with in 2022. After taking the green flag for the Atlas 200, Jesse Love of Venturini Motorsports claimed the ARCA Menards Series championship.

== Teams and drivers ==
Note: If a driver is listed as their own crew chief for a particular race, that means that their entry in that race was a start and park.

=== Complete schedule ===
Manufacturer	Team	No.	Driver	Crew chief
Chevrolet	Rev Racing	2	Lavar Scott 1	Jamie Jones
Chevrolet	Rev Racing	2	Andrés Pérez de Lara (R) 19 (Note: Pérez de Lara is running the full season split between the Fast Track Racing No. 01 car and Rev Racing No. 2 car.)	Jamie Jones
Chevrolet	Veer Motorsports (Note: Entries were fielded in a collaboration with Fast Track Racing.)	66	Jon Garrett (R)	Mike Sroufe
Ford	AM Racing	32	Christian Rose (R)	Ryan London
Ford	Clubb Racing Inc.	03	Brayton Laster 1 (Note: Entries were fielded in a collaboration with Mullins Racing.)	Robert Bruce 1 Brian Clubb 13; Chris Nicoles 1 Alex Clubb 5
Ford	Clubb Racing Inc.	03	Alex Clubb 14	Robert Bruce 1 Brian Clubb 13; Chris Nicoles 1 Alex Clubb 5
Ford	Clubb Racing Inc.	03	Roger Carter 1	Robert Bruce 1 Brian Clubb 13; Chris Nicoles 1 Alex Clubb 5
Ford	Clubb Racing Inc.	03	Casey Carden 3	Robert Bruce 1 Brian Clubb 13; Chris Nicoles 1 Alex Clubb 5
Ford	Clubb Racing Inc.	03	A. J. Moyer (R) 1	Robert Bruce 1 Brian Clubb 13; Chris Nicoles 1 Alex Clubb 5
Ford	Rette Jones Racing	30	Frankie Muniz (R)	Mark Rette
Toyota	Joe Gibbs Racing	18	Connor Mosack 6	Matt Ross
Toyota	Joe Gibbs Racing	18	William Sawalich 13	Matt Ross
Toyota	Joe Gibbs Racing	18	Taylor Gray 1	Matt Ross
Toyota	Venturini Motorsports	15	Amber Balcaen 3	Dave Leiner Jr. 4 Billy Venturini 1 Kevin Reed Jr. 5 Monon Rahman 5 Cayden Lapcevich 5
Toyota	Venturini Motorsports	15	Sean Hingorani 8	Dave Leiner Jr. 4 Billy Venturini 1 Kevin Reed Jr. 5 Monon Rahman 5 Cayden Lapcevich 5
Toyota	Venturini Motorsports	15	Conner Jones 1	Dave Leiner Jr. 4 Billy Venturini 1 Kevin Reed Jr. 5 Monon Rahman 5 Cayden Lapcevich 5
Toyota	Venturini Motorsports	15	Dean Thompson 2	Dave Leiner Jr. 4 Billy Venturini 1 Kevin Reed Jr. 5 Monon Rahman 5 Cayden Lapcevich 5
Toyota	Venturini Motorsports	15	Jake Finch 2	Dave Leiner Jr. 4 Billy Venturini 1 Kevin Reed Jr. 5 Monon Rahman 5 Cayden Lapcevich 5
Toyota	Venturini Motorsports	15	Kris Wright 1	Dave Leiner Jr. 4 Billy Venturini 1 Kevin Reed Jr. 5 Monon Rahman 5 Cayden Lapcevich 5
Toyota	Venturini Motorsports	15	Taylor Reimer 1	Dave Leiner Jr. 4 Billy Venturini 1 Kevin Reed Jr. 5 Monon Rahman 5 Cayden Lapcevich 5
Toyota	Venturini Motorsports	15	Toni Breidinger 1	Dave Leiner Jr. 4 Billy Venturini 1 Kevin Reed Jr. 5 Monon Rahman 5 Cayden Lapcevich 5
Toyota	Venturini Motorsports	15	Mamba Smith 1	Dave Leiner Jr. 4 Billy Venturini 1 Kevin Reed Jr. 5 Monon Rahman 5 Cayden Lapcevich 5
Toyota	Venturini Motorsports	20	Jesse Love (R)	Shannon Rursch
Toyota	Venturini Motorsports	25	Gus Dean 4	Kevin Reed Jr. 11; Cayden Lapcevich 5 Monon Rahman 4
Toyota	Venturini Motorsports	25	Conner Jones 7	Kevin Reed Jr. 11; Cayden Lapcevich 5 Monon Rahman 4
Toyota	Venturini Motorsports	25	Dean Thompson 2	Kevin Reed Jr. 11; Cayden Lapcevich 5 Monon Rahman 4
Toyota	Venturini Motorsports	25	Toni Breidinger 2	Kevin Reed Jr. 11; Cayden Lapcevich 5 Monon Rahman 4
Toyota	Venturini Motorsports	25	Brent Crews 4	Kevin Reed Jr. 11; Cayden Lapcevich 5 Monon Rahman 4
Toyota	Venturini Motorsports	25	Sean Hingorani 1	Kevin Reed Jr. 11; Cayden Lapcevich 5 Monon Rahman 4
Chevrolet 2 Ford 7 Toyota 11	Fast Track Racing	10	Ed Pompa 5	David Ifft 1 Tim Monroe 7 Todd Parrott 2 Dick Doheny 4 Dustin Hillenburg 1 Wayne Doolin 1 Nathan Davis 1 Ron Vandermeir Sr. 1 Dallas Frueh 1 Andy Hillenburg 1
Chevrolet 2 Ford 7 Toyota 11	Fast Track Racing	10	Tim Monroe 9	David Ifft 1 Tim Monroe 7 Todd Parrott 2 Dick Doheny 4 Dustin Hillenburg 1 Wayne Doolin 1 Nathan Davis 1 Ron Vandermeir Sr. 1 Dallas Frueh 1 Andy Hillenburg 1
Chevrolet 2 Ford 7 Toyota 11	Fast Track Racing	10	Willie Mullins 1	David Ifft 1 Tim Monroe 7 Todd Parrott 2 Dick Doheny 4 Dustin Hillenburg 1 Wayne Doolin 1 Nathan Davis 1 Ron Vandermeir Sr. 1 Dallas Frueh 1 Andy Hillenburg 1
Chevrolet 2 Ford 7 Toyota 11	Fast Track Racing	10	Gage Rodgers 1	David Ifft 1 Tim Monroe 7 Todd Parrott 2 Dick Doheny 4 Dustin Hillenburg 1 Wayne Doolin 1 Nathan Davis 1 Ron Vandermeir Sr. 1 Dallas Frueh 1 Andy Hillenburg 1
Chevrolet 2 Ford 7 Toyota 11	Fast Track Racing	10	Ken Schrader 1	David Ifft 1 Tim Monroe 7 Todd Parrott 2 Dick Doheny 4 Dustin Hillenburg 1 Wayne Doolin 1 Nathan Davis 1 Ron Vandermeir Sr. 1 Dallas Frueh 1 Andy Hillenburg 1
Chevrolet 2 Ford 7 Toyota 11	Fast Track Racing	10	Ron Vandermeir Jr. 1 (Note: Entry was fielded in a collaboration with Vanco Racing.)	David Ifft 1 Tim Monroe 7 Todd Parrott 2 Dick Doheny 4 Dustin Hillenburg 1 Wayne Doolin 1 Nathan Davis 1 Ron Vandermeir Sr. 1 Dallas Frueh 1 Andy Hillenburg 1
Chevrolet 2 Ford 7 Toyota 11	Fast Track Racing	10	Clayton Weatherman 1 (Note: Entry was fielded in a collaboration with Weatherman Motorsports.)	David Ifft 1 Tim Monroe 7 Todd Parrott 2 Dick Doheny 4 Dustin Hillenburg 1 Wayne Doolin 1 Nathan Davis 1 Ron Vandermeir Sr. 1 Dallas Frueh 1 Andy Hillenburg 1
Chevrolet 2 Ford 7 Toyota 11	Fast Track Racing	10	D. L. Wilson 1	David Ifft 1 Tim Monroe 7 Todd Parrott 2 Dick Doheny 4 Dustin Hillenburg 1 Wayne Doolin 1 Nathan Davis 1 Ron Vandermeir Sr. 1 Dallas Frueh 1 Andy Hillenburg 1
Toyota 15 Ford 4 Chevrolet 1	Fast Track Racing	11	Bryce Haugeberg 4	Dick Doheny 4 Austin Nemire 1 Josh Reaume 1 Todd Parrott 10; Tim Monroe 1 Dallas Frueh 1 Nathan Davis 1 Nyx Harenberg 1
Toyota 15 Ford 4 Chevrolet 1	Fast Track Racing	11	Josh Reaume 1	Dick Doheny 4 Austin Nemire 1 Josh Reaume 1 Todd Parrott 10; Tim Monroe 1 Dallas Frueh 1 Nathan Davis 1 Nyx Harenberg 1
Toyota 15 Ford 4 Chevrolet 1	Fast Track Racing	11	Zachary Tinkle 6	Dick Doheny 4 Austin Nemire 1 Josh Reaume 1 Todd Parrott 10; Tim Monroe 1 Dallas Frueh 1 Nathan Davis 1 Nyx Harenberg 1
Toyota 15 Ford 4 Chevrolet 1	Fast Track Racing	11	Stephanie Moyer 2	Dick Doheny 4 Austin Nemire 1 Josh Reaume 1 Todd Parrott 10; Tim Monroe 1 Dallas Frueh 1 Nathan Davis 1 Nyx Harenberg 1
Toyota 15 Ford 4 Chevrolet 1	Fast Track Racing	11	Zach Herrin 2	Dick Doheny 4 Austin Nemire 1 Josh Reaume 1 Todd Parrott 10; Tim Monroe 1 Dallas Frueh 1 Nathan Davis 1 Nyx Harenberg 1
Toyota 15 Ford 4 Chevrolet 1	Fast Track Racing	11	Morgen Baird 1	Dick Doheny 4 Austin Nemire 1 Josh Reaume 1 Todd Parrott 10; Tim Monroe 1 Dallas Frueh 1 Nathan Davis 1 Nyx Harenberg 1
Toyota 15 Ford 4 Chevrolet 1	Fast Track Racing	11	Tim Monroe 1	Dick Doheny 4 Austin Nemire 1 Josh Reaume 1 Todd Parrott 10; Tim Monroe 1 Dallas Frueh 1 Nathan Davis 1 Nyx Harenberg 1
Toyota 15 Ford 4 Chevrolet 1	Fast Track Racing	11	Dallas Frueh 1	Dick Doheny 4 Austin Nemire 1 Josh Reaume 1 Todd Parrott 10; Tim Monroe 1 Dallas Frueh 1 Nathan Davis 1 Nyx Harenberg 1
Toyota 15 Ford 4 Chevrolet 1	Fast Track Racing	11	Matt Kemp 1	Dick Doheny 4 Austin Nemire 1 Josh Reaume 1 Todd Parrott 10; Tim Monroe 1 Dallas Frueh 1 Nathan Davis 1 Nyx Harenberg 1
Toyota 15 Ford 4 Chevrolet 1	Fast Track Racing	11	Darrell Basham 1	Dick Doheny 4 Austin Nemire 1 Josh Reaume 1 Todd Parrott 10; Tim Monroe 1 Dallas Frueh 1 Nathan Davis 1 Nyx Harenberg 1
Toyota 5 Ford 12 Chevrolet 3	Fast Track Racing	12	Zach Herrin 1	Todd Parrott 1 Dick Doheny 7 Tim Monroe 4 Bruce Shakespeare 1 John Claggett 1 Nathan Davis 1 George Church 1 Dallas Frueh 1 Jeremy Petty 3
Toyota 5 Ford 12 Chevrolet 3	Fast Track Racing	12	D. L. Wilson 2	Todd Parrott 1 Dick Doheny 7 Tim Monroe 4 Bruce Shakespeare 1 John Claggett 1 Nathan Davis 1 George Church 1 Dallas Frueh 1 Jeremy Petty 3
Toyota 5 Ford 12 Chevrolet 3	Fast Track Racing	12	Tim Monroe 5	Todd Parrott 1 Dick Doheny 7 Tim Monroe 4 Bruce Shakespeare 1 John Claggett 1 Nathan Davis 1 George Church 1 Dallas Frueh 1 Jeremy Petty 3
Toyota 5 Ford 12 Chevrolet 3	Fast Track Racing	12	Gage Rodgers 1	Todd Parrott 1 Dick Doheny 7 Tim Monroe 4 Bruce Shakespeare 1 John Claggett 1 Nathan Davis 1 George Church 1 Dallas Frueh 1 Jeremy Petty 3
Toyota 5 Ford 12 Chevrolet 3	Fast Track Racing	12	Brayton Laster 1	Todd Parrott 1 Dick Doheny 7 Tim Monroe 4 Bruce Shakespeare 1 John Claggett 1 Nathan Davis 1 George Church 1 Dallas Frueh 1 Jeremy Petty 3
Toyota 5 Ford 12 Chevrolet 3	Fast Track Racing	12	Matt Kemp 2	Todd Parrott 1 Dick Doheny 7 Tim Monroe 4 Bruce Shakespeare 1 John Claggett 1 Nathan Davis 1 George Church 1 Dallas Frueh 1 Jeremy Petty 3
Toyota 5 Ford 12 Chevrolet 3	Fast Track Racing	12	Ryan Roulette 2	Todd Parrott 1 Dick Doheny 7 Tim Monroe 4 Bruce Shakespeare 1 John Claggett 1 Nathan Davis 1 George Church 1 Dallas Frueh 1 Jeremy Petty 3
Toyota 5 Ford 12 Chevrolet 3	Fast Track Racing	12	Zachary Tinkle 1	Todd Parrott 1 Dick Doheny 7 Tim Monroe 4 Bruce Shakespeare 1 John Claggett 1 Nathan Davis 1 George Church 1 Dallas Frueh 1 Jeremy Petty 3
Toyota 5 Ford 12 Chevrolet 3	Fast Track Racing	12	Stanton Barrett 1	Todd Parrott 1 Dick Doheny 7 Tim Monroe 4 Bruce Shakespeare 1 John Claggett 1 Nathan Davis 1 George Church 1 Dallas Frueh 1 Jeremy Petty 3
Toyota 5 Ford 12 Chevrolet 3	Fast Track Racing	12	Dallas Frueh 1	Todd Parrott 1 Dick Doheny 7 Tim Monroe 4 Bruce Shakespeare 1 John Claggett 1 Nathan Davis 1 George Church 1 Dallas Frueh 1 Jeremy Petty 3
Toyota 5 Ford 12 Chevrolet 3	Fast Track Racing	12	Ryan Huff 1	Todd Parrott 1 Dick Doheny 7 Tim Monroe 4 Bruce Shakespeare 1 John Claggett 1 Nathan Davis 1 George Church 1 Dallas Frueh 1 Jeremy Petty 3
Toyota 5 Ford 12 Chevrolet 3	Fast Track Racing	12	Ed Pompa 1	Todd Parrott 1 Dick Doheny 7 Tim Monroe 4 Bruce Shakespeare 1 John Claggett 1 Nathan Davis 1 George Church 1 Dallas Frueh 1 Jeremy Petty 3
Toyota 5 Ford 12 Chevrolet 3	Fast Track Racing	12	Stephanie Moyer 1	Todd Parrott 1 Dick Doheny 7 Tim Monroe 4 Bruce Shakespeare 1 John Claggett 1 Nathan Davis 1 George Church 1 Dallas Frueh 1 Jeremy Petty 3
Chevrolet 11 Ford 9	Brad Smith Motorsports	48	Brad Smith 19	Terry Strange 2 Rand Bitter 1 Colby Evans 2 Aaron Burzynski 1 Jeff Smith 8 Leo Kryger 2 Brad Smith 1 Noah Wetzel 2
Chevrolet 11 Ford 9	Brad Smith Motorsports	48	Rick Redig-Tackman 1	Rick Tackman Jr.
Chevrolet 4 Toyota 12 Ford 4	Wayne Peterson Racing 18; Richmond Motorsports 2	06	A. J. Moyer (R) 15	Michael Peterson 7 Wayne Peterson 2 Dan Lorz 1 Nate Moeller 9 Adam Murphy 1
Chevrolet 4 Toyota 12 Ford 4	Wayne Peterson Racing 18; Richmond Motorsports 2	06	Tim Richmond 2	Michael Peterson 7 Wayne Peterson 2 Dan Lorz 1 Nate Moeller 9 Adam Murphy 1
Chevrolet 4 Toyota 12 Ford 4	Wayne Peterson Racing 18; Richmond Motorsports 2	06	Kevin Hinckle 2	Michael Peterson 7 Wayne Peterson 2 Dan Lorz 1 Nate Moeller 9 Adam Murphy 1
Chevrolet 4 Toyota 12 Ford 4	Wayne Peterson Racing 18; Richmond Motorsports 2	06	Nate Moeller 1	Michael Peterson 7 Wayne Peterson 2 Dan Lorz 1 Nate Moeller 9 Adam Murphy 1

=== Limited schedule ===
Manufacturer	Team	No.	Driver	Crew chief	Rounds
Chevrolet	1/4 Ley Racing	4	Dale Quarterley	Alex Quarterley	4
Chevrolet	Bill McAnally Racing	16	Tanner Reif	John Camilleri	1
Chevrolet	Bob Schacht Motorsports	75	Bob Schacht	Matt Wolper	2
Chevrolet	Bret Holmes Racing	23	Bret Holmes	Jerry Baxter	1
Chevrolet	Brother-In-Law Motorsports	57	Hunter Deshautelle	Todd Cooper 1 Dick Rahilly 1	2
Chevrolet	Brother-In-Law Motorsports	75	Bryan Dauzat	Bob Rahilly	4
Chevrolet	Cook Racing Technologies	42	Robby Lyons	Sean Samuels	1
Chevrolet	Cook Racing Technologies	42	Matt Gould	Sean Samuels	1
Chevrolet	Costner Weaver Motorsports	93	Caleb Costner	Darrell Phillips 1 Derek Kearns 4	5
Chevrolet	Costner Weaver Motorsports	93	Isaac Johnson	Riley Higgins	1
Chevrolet	CR7 Motorsports	97	Jason Kitzmiller	Todd Myers	5
Chevrolet	CR7 Motorsports	97	Grant Enfinger	Todd Myers	2
Chevrolet	CR7 Motorsports	97	Landen Lewis	Todd Myers	1
Chevrolet	Fierce Creature Racing	27	Bobby Hillis Jr.	Bobby Hillis Jr.	1
Chevrolet	Ferrier McClure Racing	44	Jason White	Jeff McClure	2
Chevrolet	KC Motorsports	82	Kevin Campbell	Mason Campbell	2
Chevrolet	Kelly Kovski Racing	16	Kelly Kovski	Jon Hanson	2
Chevrolet	Pinnacle Racing Group	28	Luke Fenhaus	Shane Huffman	4
Chevrolet	Pinnacle Racing Group	28	Connor Zilisch	Shane Huffman	1
Chevrolet	Pinnacle Racing Group	28	Carson Kvapil	Shane Huffman	1
Chevrolet	Rev Racing	51	Jack Wood	Matt Bucher 1 Steve Plattenberger 6	1
Chevrolet	Rev Racing	6	Jack Wood	Matt Bucher 1 Steve Plattenberger 6	7
Chevrolet	Rev Racing	6	Lavar Scott	Jay Lupo	5
Chevrolet	Rise Motorsports	31	Stephen Leicht	Tim Goulet 11; Rita Goulet 2	1
Chevrolet	Rise Motorsports	31	Tim Goulet	Tim Goulet 11; Rita Goulet 2	3
Chevrolet	Rise Motorsports	31	Rita Goulet	Tim Goulet 11; Rita Goulet 2	5
Chevrolet	Rise Motorsports	31	Casey Carden	Tim Goulet 11; Rita Goulet 2	1
Chevrolet	Rise Motorsports	31	Brayton Laster	Tim Goulet 11; Rita Goulet 2	3
Chevrolet	Spraker Racing Enterprises	63	Logan Misuraca	Jeff Spraker	3
Chevrolet	Spraker Racing Enterprises	63	Corey LaJoie	Jeff Spraker	1
Chevrolet	Spraker Racing Enterprises	63	Mason Ludwig	Jeff Spraker	1
Chevrolet	Steve Lewis Racing	62	Steve Lewis Jr.	Steve Lewis Sr.	2
Chevrolet	Tamayo Cosentino Racing	43	Jalen Mack	Mat Howcraft 1 Riley Higgins 1	2
Chevrolet	Team Chick Motorsports	74	Mandy Chick (R)	Steve Chick	4
Chevrolet	Young's Motorsports	02	Miguel Gomes	Andrew Abbott	1
Chevrolet	Young's Motorsports	02	Leland Honeyman	Andrew Abbott	1
Chevrolet	Young's Motorsports	02	Parker Retzlaff	Andrew Abbott	1
Ford	Central Coast Racing	13	Todd Souza	Michael Muñoz	2
Ford	Coughlin Brothers Racing	72	Cody Coughlin	Kevin Reed Sr.	5
Ford	Emerling-Gase Motorsports	53	Natalie Decker	Jan Leaty	1
Ford	Emerling-Gase Motorsports	53	Patrick Emerling	Wayne Carroll Jr.	1
Ford	High Point Racing	50	Trevor Huddleston	Jeff Schrader	1
Ford	Huff Racing	36	Ryan Huff	Richard Burgess	1
Ford	Kimmel Racing	68	Gage Rodgers	Tony Heavrin	1
Ford	Kimmel Racing	68	Mike Basham	Tony Heavrin	1
Ford	Lowden Jackson Motorsports	41	Tyler Reif	Tony Jackson	1
Ford	Lowden Jackson Motorsports	46	R. J. Smotherman	Dave Jackson	1
Ford	Naake-Klauer Motorsports	88	Bradley Erickson	Tony Caputo	1
Ford	Ryan Roulette Racing	22	Ryan Roulette	Chris Greaney	1
Toyota	CCM Racing	7	Eric Caudell	Jeremy Petty	2
Toyota	CCM Racing	7	Matt Wilson	Jeremy Petty	1
Toyota	Hattori Racing Enterprises	61	Tyler Ankrum	Jon Leonard	1
Toyota	Jerry Pitts Racing	7	Takuma Koga	Denny Moyer	1
Toyota	Jerry Pitts Racing	70	Kyle Keller	Jerry Pitts	1
Toyota	MacZink Racing	65	Jeffery MacZink	Jarod MacZink	1
Toyota	MAN Motorsports	95	Chris Martin Jr.	Tony Ponkauskas	1
Toyota	MAN Motorsports	95	Tanner Arms	Tony Ponkauskas	1
Toyota	MAN Motorsports	95	Conner Popplewell	Tony Ponkauskas	1
Toyota	Nascimento Motorsports	04	Ethan Nascimento	Mike Nascimento	1
Toyota	Nascimento Motorsports	4	Eric Nascimento	Ty Joiner	1
Toyota	Phoenix Racing	1	Jake Finch	Johnny Allen	2
Toyota	Richmond Motorsports	27	Tim Richmond	David Richmond	2
Toyota	Shearer Speed Racing	98	Dale Shearer	Alex Malycke 3 Neal Shearer 1	4
Toyota	Shockwave Motorsports	05	David Smith	Brandon Carlson	1
Toyota	Tricon Garage	17	Taylor Gray	David Gilliland	2
Toyota	Venturini Motorsports	1	Jake Finch	Billy Venturini	1 (Note: Entry was fielded in a collaboration with Phoenix Racing.)
Toyota	Venturini Motorsports	55	Toni Breidinger	Cayden Lapcevich 9 Monon Rahman 3 Kevin Reed Jr. 2	10
Toyota	Venturini Motorsports	55	Dean Thompson	Cayden Lapcevich 9 Monon Rahman 3 Kevin Reed Jr. 2	1
Toyota	Venturini Motorsports	55	Kris Wright	Cayden Lapcevich 9 Monon Rahman 3 Kevin Reed Jr. 2	1
Toyota	Venturini Motorsports	55	Jake Finch	Cayden Lapcevich 9 Monon Rahman 3 Kevin Reed Jr. 2	1
Toyota	Venturini Motorsports	55	Gus Dean	Cayden Lapcevich 9 Monon Rahman 3 Kevin Reed Jr. 2	1
Chevrolet 1 Ford 2	Charles Buchanan Racing	87	Chuck Buchanan Jr.	Craig Wood	3
Chevrolet 4 Ford 3	Empire Racing	8	Sean Corr	Mike Cheek	7
Chevrolet 2 Ford 5	Greg Van Alst Motorsports	35	Greg Van Alst	Jim Long	7
Ford 2 Toyota 7 Chevrolet 1	KLAS Motorsports	73	Andy Jankowiak	Mike Dayton	10
Chevrolet 6 Ford 4	Tamayo Cosentino Racing	45	Tony Cosentino	Caleb Allen 1 Tony Cosentino 8 Matt Weber 1	9
Chevrolet 6 Ford 4	Tamayo Cosentino Racing	45	Don Thompson	Caleb Allen 1 Tony Cosentino 8 Matt Weber 1	1
Chevrolet 1 Ford 1	Mullins Racing	3	Willie Mullins	Austin Simmons	1
Chevrolet 1 Ford 1	Mullins Racing	3	Landon Pembelton	Kevin Reed Sr.	1
Ford 1 Chevrolet 1	Brad Smith Motorsports	49	Jeff Smith	Jeff Smith	2
Ford 7 Toyota 6	Kimmel Racing 13; Brad Smith Motorsports 1	69	Scott Melton	Bill Kimmel 8 Will Kimmel 1 Zach Berthiaume 2 Jeff Smith 1 Leo Kryger 1	8
Ford 7 Toyota 6	Kimmel Racing 13; Brad Smith Motorsports 1	69	Mike Basham	Bill Kimmel 8 Will Kimmel 1 Zach Berthiaume 2 Jeff Smith 1 Leo Kryger 1	3
Ford 7 Toyota 6	Kimmel Racing 13; Brad Smith Motorsports 1	69	Brad Smith	Bill Kimmel 8 Will Kimmel 1 Zach Berthiaume 2 Jeff Smith 1 Leo Kryger 1	1
Ford 7 Toyota 6	Kimmel Racing 13; Brad Smith Motorsports 1	69	Will Kimmel	Bill Kimmel 8 Will Kimmel 1 Zach Berthiaume 2 Jeff Smith 1 Leo Kryger 1	2
Ford 1 Toyota 4	Wayne Peterson Racing	0	Kevin Hinckle	Nate Moeller	2
Ford 1 Toyota 4	Wayne Peterson Racing	0	A. J. Moyer (R)	Wayne Peterson	1
Ford 1 Toyota 4	Wayne Peterson Racing	0	Nate Moeller	Wayne Peterson	2
Chevrolet 4 Ford 1 Toyota 3	Fast Track Racing	01	Andrés Pérez de Lara (R)	Dylan Roberts	1
Chevrolet 4 Ford 1 Toyota 3	Fast Track Racing	01	Zachary Tinkle	Josh Duke	1
Chevrolet 4 Ford 1 Toyota 3	Fast Track Racing	01	C. J. McLaughlin	Jay Hawley	1
Chevrolet 4 Ford 1 Toyota 3	Fast Track Racing	01	Davey Callihan	Kevin Reed Sr.	1
Chevrolet 4 Ford 1 Toyota 3	Fast Track Racing	01	Brayton Laster	Nathan Davis	2
Chevrolet 4 Ford 1 Toyota 3	Fast Track Racing	01	Dallas Frueh	Nathan Davis	1
Chevrolet 4 Ford 1 Toyota 3	Fast Track Racing	01	Tim Monroe	Tim Monroe	1
Toyota 1 Chevrolet 1	McGowan Motorsports	17	Landen Lewis	Amber Slagle	1
Toyota 1 Chevrolet 1	McGowan Motorsports	17	Kaden Honeycutt	Amber Slagle	1

=== Changes ===
==== Teams ====
- On August 4, 2022, it was announced that 3F Racing, a team from Germany, would make their debut in the ARCA Menards Series and NASCAR Truck Series with Christopher Tate driving for the team in those series as well as the NASCAR Cup Series with a yet to be determined driver. On October 17, Tate announced a sponsor for his ARCA starts, effectively announcing that he would make his debut in 2023.
- On September 5, 2022, it was revealed that Hendren Motorsports would not be back in 2023 as car owner Bill Hendren retired after the 2022 season. The team fielded the No. 24 car in the two dirt races for Ryan Unzicker for several years.
- On September 12, 2022, Dale Shearer revealed on his website that his team would be back in ARCA for the first time since 2019. Shearer has previously used the No. 73 but Andy Jankowiak's team took that number during Shearer's time away from the series so he will need to pick a different number to use in 2023.
- On October 17, 2022, Mandy Chick announced on the SRWRadio Podcast that she would run full-time for her family team, Team Chick Motorsports, in the main ARCA Series in 2023. It will be the team's first time running the full season in the main ARCA Series.
- On December 9, 2022, it was announced that the No. 18 car would go back to being owned by Joe Gibbs Racing in 2023. It was owned by Kyle Busch Motorsports in 2022.
- On December 12, 2022, AM Racing announced that they would be fielding an ARCA car full-time in 2023. The team previously fielded the No. 32 car part-time.
- On December 19, 2022, Brad Smith tweeted that he would be expanding his team to two full-time cars and the number of his second car would be the No. 26, which his team previously used from 1998 to 2012. The driver(s) of the No. 26 car were not announced in that tweet. The team did not end up fielding a second car full-time but did debut a second car, the No. 49, at Berlin with Brad's brother Jeff driving.
- On January 6, 2023, GMS Racing announced that they would be closing down their ARCA team in 2023 after the team's expansion to their Truck Series team. Daniel Dye, who drove full-time for GMS in the main ARCA Series in 2022, is moving up to the Truck Series full-time in 2023 driving for GMS.
- On January 8, 2023, it was announced that Tim Goulet Enterprises would rename to Rise Motorsports in 2023. On February 13, 2023, the team announced that Rita Goulet (nee Thomason) would run the full season in the East Series, which includes the main ARCA/East Series combination races. The team had announced on January 8 that Stephen Leicht would drive for them in the combination race at Bristol so the team will likely field two cars in that race for both drivers. It would be the team's first time fielding a second car.

==== Drivers ====
- On May 8, 2022, it was announced that Steve Austin would drive full-time for T.C. Enterprises in 2023, but his arrest on May 22 may result in these plans falling through. (He was never officially suspended by ARCA or a public statement from ARCA announcing his suspension was never released.)
- On August 3, 2022, Rita Thomason revealed on the ARCA Reddit page that she would return to Tim Goulet Enterprises in 2023. On January 8, 2023, it was announced that TGE would rename to Rise Motorsports in 2023 and continue to field the No. 31 car in the main ARCA Series and the East Series for Rita, whose last name is now Goulet after she married the team's owner, Tim Goulet, over the offseason, as well as Stephen Leicht. On February 13, it was announced that Rita Goulet would run the full East Series season for the team in 2023. She and Leicht are both scheduled to run the main ARCA/East Series combination race at Bristol so the team will likely field two cars in that race.
- On August 4, 2022, it was announced that Christopher Tate would make his ARCA debut for the new 3F Racing team. On October 17, Tate announced a sponsor for his ARCA starts, effectively announcing that he would make his debut in 2023.
- On August 12, 2022, it was announced that Toni Breidinger would drive in the Toyota Gazoo Racing North America GR Cup in 2023. The series is only 14 races on 7 weekends so depending on the schedule, she could still return to ARCA full-time and if not, part-time.
- On October 6, 2022, during Corey LaJoie's kickball tournament, the broadcasters on NASCAR's YouTube livestream mentioned during the top of the fifth inning that actor Frankie Muniz could run at least part-time in ARCA in 2023. He tested an ARCA car for Fast Track Racing in the test session at Daytona in January 2022. On January 5, 2023, ThePitLane reported that Muniz could drive full-time for Rette Jones Racing in 2023. On January 11, RJR officially announced that Muniz would drive their No. 30 car full-time in the main ARCA Series in 2023, replacing Amber Balcaen, who moved to Venturini Motorsports to drive their No. 15 car part-time in 2023.
- On October 10, 2022, NASCAR Whelen Euro Series driver Thomas Krasonis announced that he would make his ARCA debut in 2023. The team he will drive for has yet to be announced. He would be the first driver from Greece to compete in the series.
- On October 17, 2022, Mandy Chick announced on the SRWRadio Podcast that she would run full-time for her family team, Team Chick Motorsports, in the main ARCA Series in 2023.
- On October 21, 2022, Logan Misuraca announced that she would run part-time starting at the season-opener at Daytona with hopes to run a full season with sponsorship from 1inamillion.life, a company she founded. On November 1, she revealed to Forbes that she would be driving for Ben Kennedy Racing.
- On October 27, 2022, Mark Kristl from Frontstretch stated on the ARCA Reddit page that he anticipated that David Gilliland Racing would field at least a part-time ARCA car again in 2023 after the team's name change to TRICON Garage and that Rev Racing intends to return to ARCA with their 2023 driver lineup being determined after their Drive for Diversity combine event. Nick Sanchez is moving up to the Truck Series full-time in 2023 with Rev Racing and Rajah Caruth is moving up to the Truck Series full-time in 2023 driving for GMS Racing. On January 13, 2023, Rev announced that Andrés Pérez de Lara would drive the No. 2 car full-time in 2023 except for the season-opener at Daytona as he would still be 17 years old and ineligible to race there. Lavar Scott was also announced to run the full season in the East Series for the team in 2023 (which includes 4 combination races with the main ARCA Series) and he would also replace Pérez de Lara in the No. 2 car at Daytona as he is 18 and old enough to race at the track.
- On November 14, 2022, an ARCA Reddit user posted that Bobby Gerhart Racing had posted on RacingJunk.com that their No. 5 car is open for the season-opener at Daytona for a driver that brings sponsorship. The driver has yet to be determined. BGR did not end up attempting the season-opener at Daytona.
- On November 15, 2022, The Daily Reporter (Coldwater) reported that Gage Rodgers would like to run the 2023 season-opener at Daytona for Kimmel Racing and will test with the team at Daytona in January.
- On December 2, 2022, Clubb Racing Inc. announced that Brayton Laster, Casey Carden and team owner Alex Clubb will share the No. 03 car full-time. All three drivers also drove the car in 2022.
- On December 6, 2022, it was announced that Zachary Tinkle, who ran the full season in the main ARCA Series aside from the race at Mid-Ohio, would run full-time in the East Series in the No. 11 car for Fast Track Racing in 2023. Fast Track was one of the teams he drove part-time for in 2022.
- On December 9, 2022, it was announced that William Sawalich would drive the No. 18 car part-time in 2023 and the car would go back to being owned by Joe Gibbs Racing. It was owned by Kyle Busch Motorsports in 2022.
- On February 24, 2023, Rise Motorsports announced that Derrick McGrew Jr. would make his ARCA debut for them in 2023 and drive their No. 31 car part-time. McGrew ended up only running one East Series race for the team.
- On March 24, 2023, Venturini Motorsports announced that NASCAR Mexico Series driver Regina Sirvent would drive part-time for them in ARCA in 2023, making her debut in the series. However, Sirvent ended up not running any ARCA races for the team in 2023.
- On May 25, 2023, it was announced that Grant Enfinger would drive the No. 97 car for CR7 Motorsports, who he drove part-time for in the Truck Series in 2021, in the race at Charlotte.
- On July 10, 2023, ARCA suspended Sean Hingorani for 1 race (Iowa) after he crashed Dean Thompson on purpose on the final lap in the race at Mid-Ohio when he was a lap down and Thompson was running second.

==== Crew chiefs ====
- On January 4, 2023, Costner Weaver Motorsports announced that the crew chief of their No. 93 car would be Darrell Phillips, who was the crew chief for Tim Richmond's No. 27 car in 2022.

==== Manufacturers ====
- On December 12, 2022, AM Racing announced that they would be switching from Chevrolet to Ford in 2023.

==== Sponsorship ====
- On October 17, 2022, it was announced that T Top Manufacturing would sponsor Christopher Tate in his ARCA starts for 3F Racing in 2023.
- On October 21, 2022, it was revealed that 1inamillion.life, a program created by driver Logan Misuraca to spread awareness about mental health, would sponsor her in her ARCA starts in 2023.

== Schedule ==
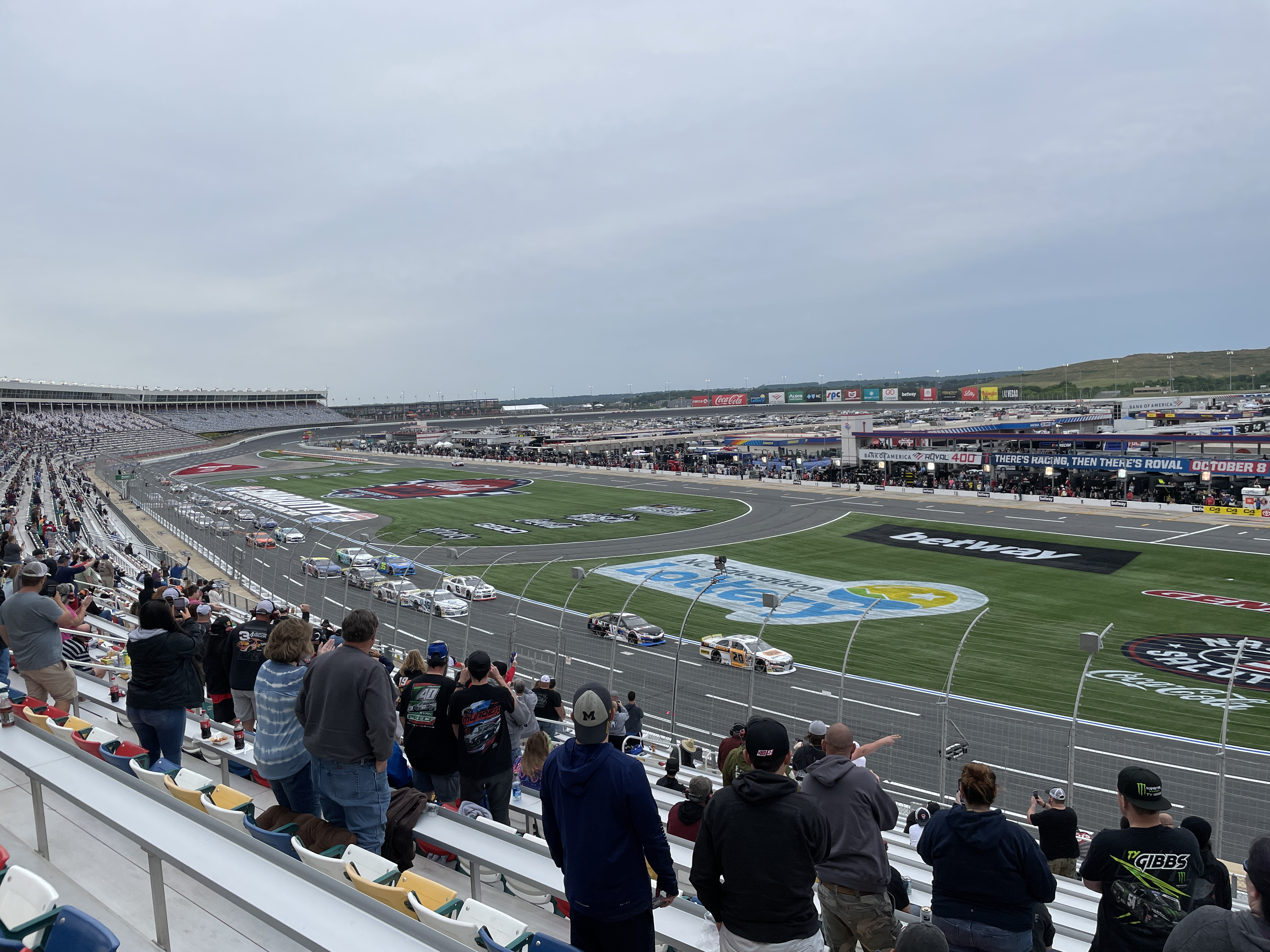
The General Tire 150 at Charlotte Motor Speedway in May

Some tracks announced their 2022 race dates before the release of the entire schedule on November 11, 2022.

After previously only broadcasting about half of the main ARCA Series races for several years (usually only the races that were on the same weekend and at the same track as a NASCAR Cup, Xfinity and/or Truck race), Fox announced that they would broadcast all 20 main ARCA Series races in 2023.

Notes:

- The race at Phoenix in March was a combination race with the ARCA Menards Series West (highlighted in gold).
- The races at Iowa, IRP, Milwaukee and Bristol are combination races with the ARCA Menards Series East (highlighted in silver).

No	Race title	Track	Location	Date
1	BRANDT 200	Daytona International Speedway	Daytona Beach, Florida	February 18
2	General Tire 150	Phoenix Raceway	Avondale, Arizona	March 10
3	General Tire 200	Talladega Superspeedway	Lincoln, Alabama	April 22
4	Dawn 150	Kansas Speedway	Kansas City, Kansas	May 6
5	General Tire 150	Charlotte Motor Speedway	Concord, North Carolina	May 26
6	Herr's Snacks 200	Berlin Raceway	Marne, Michigan	June 17
7	Menards 250	Elko Speedway	Elko New Market, Minnesota	June 24
8	Zinsser SmartCoat 150	Mid-Ohio Sports Car Course	Lexington, Ohio	July 7
9	Calypso Lemonade 150	Iowa Speedway	Newton, Iowa	July 15
10	Sunset Hill Shooting Range 150	Pocono Raceway	Long Pond, Pennsylvania	July 22 (Note: The Sunset Hill Shooting Range 150 was postponed from Friday, July 21 to Saturday, July 22 due to rain.)
11	Henry Ford Health 200	Michigan International Speedway	Brooklyn, Michigan	August 4
12	Reese's 200	Lucas Oil Indianapolis Raceway Park	Brownsburg, Indiana	August 11
13	General Tire 100 at The Glen	Watkins Glen International	Watkins Glen, New York	August 18
14	Dutch Boy 100	Illinois State Fairgrounds Racetrack	Springfield, Illinois	August 20
15	Sprecher 150	Milwaukee Mile	West Allis, Wisconsin	August 27
16	Southern Illinois 100	DuQuoin State Fairgrounds Racetrack	Du Quoin, Illinois	September 3
17	Sioux Chief Fast Track 150	Kansas Speedway	Kansas City, Kansas	September 8
18	Bush's Beans 200	Bristol Motor Speedway	Bristol, Tennessee	September 14
19	Atlas 200	Salem Speedway	Salem, Indiana	September 30
20	Shore Lunch 200	Toledo Speedway	Toledo, Ohio	October 7

== Results and standings ==
=== Race results ===
No.	Race	Pole position	Most laps led	Winning driver	Manufacturer	No.	Winning team	Report
1	BRANDT 200	Connor Mosack	Connor Mosack	Greg Van Alst	Chevrolet	35	Greg Van Alst Motorsports	Report
2	General Tire 150	William Sawalich	William Sawalich	Tyler Reif	Ford	41	Lowden Jackson Motorsports	Report
3	General Tire 200	Taylor Gray	Jesse Love	Jesse Love	Toyota	20	Venturini Motorsports	Report
4	Dawn 150	Jesse Love	Jesse Love	Jesse Love	Toyota	20	Venturini Motorsports	Report
5	General Tire 150	Jesse Love	Jesse Love	Jesse Love	Toyota	20	Venturini Motorsports	Report
6	Herr's Snacks 200	Jesse Love	Jesse Love	William Sawalich	Toyota	18	Joe Gibbs Racing	Report
7	Menards 250	William Sawalich	Jesse Love	Jesse Love	Toyota	20	Venturini Motorsports	Report
8	Zinsser SmartCoat 150	Sean Hingorani	Tyler Ankrum	Tyler Ankrum	Toyota	61	Hattori Racing Enterprises	Report
9	Calypso Lemonade 150	William Sawalich	William Sawalich	Luke Fenhaus	Chevrolet	28	Pinnacle Racing Group	Report
10	Sunset Hill Shooting Range 150	Dean Thompson	Jesse Love	Jesse Love	Toyota	20	Venturini Motorsports	Report
11	Henry Ford Health 200	Andrés Pérez de Lara	Andrés Pérez de Lara	Jesse Love	Toyota	20	Venturini Motorsports	Report
12	Reese's 200	Jesse Love	Jesse Love	Jesse Love	Toyota	20	Venturini Motorsports	Report
13	General Tire 100 at The Glen	Corey LaJoie	Connor Zilisch	Jesse Love	Toyota	20	Venturini Motorsports	Report
14	Dutch Boy 100	Brent Crews	Brent Crews	Brent Crews	Toyota	25	Venturini Motorsports	Report
15	Sprecher 150	William Sawalich	William Sawalich	William Sawalich	Toyota	18	Joe Gibbs Racing	Report
16	Southern Illinois 100	William Sawalich	Jesse Love	Jesse Love	Toyota	20	Venturini Motorsports	Report
17	Sioux Chief Fast Track 150	Jesse Love	Connor Mosack	Connor Mosack	Toyota	18	Joe Gibbs Racing	Report
18	Bush's Beans 200	William Sawalich	Jesse Love	William Sawalich	Toyota	18	Joe Gibbs Racing	Report
19	Atlas 200	Jesse Love	Jesse Love	Jesse Love	Toyota	20	Venturini Motorsports	Report
20	Shore Lunch 200	Jesse Love	William Sawalich	William Sawalich	Toyota	18	Joe Gibbs Racing	Report

=== Drivers' championship ===
Notes:

- The pole winner also receives one bonus point, similar to the previous ARCA points system used until 2019 and unlike NASCAR.
- Additionally, after groups of five races of the season, drivers that compete in all five races receive fifty additional points. These points bonuses will be given after the races at Charlotte, Pocono, Milwaukee and Toledo.
  - Jesse Love, Frankie Muniz, Jack Wood, Andrés Pérez de Lara, Tony Cosentino, Christian Rose, Greg Van Alst, Toni Breidinger, Jon Garrett, A. J. Moyer, and Brad Smith received this points bonus for having competed in the first five races of the season (Daytona, Phoenix, Talladega, Kansas in May, and Charlotte). Love, Pérez de Lara, Muniz, Rose, Garrett, Moyer, and Smith received the fifty bonus points for having competed in the next five races (Berlin, Elko, Mid-Ohio, Iowa and Pocono). Love, Pérez de Lara, Muniz, Rose, Garrett, Moyer, and Smith received the fifty bonus points for having competed in the next five races (Michigan, Indianapolis, Watkins Glen, Springfield and Milwaukee). Love, Pérez de Lara, Rose, Muniz, Garrett, Smith, Tim Monroe, and Alex Clubb received the fifty bonus points for having competed in the final five races (DuQuoin, Kansas, Bristol, Salem and Toledo).

(key) Bold – Pole position awarded by time. Italics – Pole position set by final practice results or rainout. * – Most laps led. ** – All laps led.

Pos	Driver	DAY	PHO	TAL	KAN	CLT	BLN	ELK	MOH	IOW	POC	MCH	IRP	GLN	ISF	MLW	DSF	KAN	BRI	SLM	TOL	Points
1	Jesse Love **(R)**	7	27	1*	**1***	**1***	**2***	1*	4	3	1*	1	**1***	1	3	2	1*	**19**	2*	**1****	**2**	1057
2	Andrés Pérez de Lara **(R)**	40	4	4	6	7	4	5	15	6	3	**17***	8	12	2	7	4	17	3	2	4	912
3	Christian Rose **(R)**	12	23	17	9	8	7	10	11	7	9	7	10	11	12	11	7	6	8	3	5	889
4	Frankie Muniz **(R)**	11	6	9	8	6	6	16	6	9	21	5	11	16	7	12	12	18	23	10	8	860
5	Jon Garrett **(R)**	25	20	27	13	14	10	11	12	10	12	10	14	19	9	21	15	12	26	7	15	778
6	Brad Smith	30	30	19	24	20	15	18	21	15	17	19	21	20	18	20	11	14	30	16	16	686
7	A. J. Moyer **(R)**	29	21	20	20	27	14	15	17	14	16	20	17	21	16	16	18		27			570
8	William Sawalich		**13***				1	2	2	**2***			4	4	5	**1***	**5**		**1**	6	1*	558
9	Toni Breidinger	23	22	12	11	12	5	9		5	6		9					3	12	4		489
10	Tim Monroe		31	34	26		16		16	17	24	21	22		14	15	8	21	25	17	18	429
11	Alex Clubb		18	33	19	21				13	19	22			15	23	9	13	22	15	11	413
12	Sean Hingorani		16				3	3	**13**				3			3	14		15		3	326
13	Jack Wood	8	28	6	5	10			3					14					9			320
14	Andy Jankowiak	32		18	28	5					7	4		7				10	10		7	312
15	Conner Jones		7					4	8	8	5		6			4			6			304
16	Tony Cosentino	15	15	11	15	11	8	7	Wth	Wth											Wth	276
17	Greg Van Alst	1	10	32	10	22							7						5			275
18	Connor Mosack	**2***			4	9					2	3						1*				253
19	Zachary Tinkle				27		9		20	11			13			13			13	11		235
20	Lavar Scott	4								4			5			8		4	17			224
21	Scott Melton	38		8	14	23				12	13	18						7				220
22	Sean Corr	3		5	16	24					20				13		13					214
23	Jake Finch										10	12		10		9		5	4			214
24	Dean Thompson				2	2			10		**4**							8				199
25	Brayton Laster	27				19				20			20		10		10			9		193
26	Ed Pompa	22		13		16					15			13						8		177
27	Brent Crews													3	**1***		2			12		166
28	Cody Coughlin				7	28					8	8						11				158
29	Gus Dean	35		2		15						2				10						149
30	Luke Fenhaus									1			2			6			29			143
31	Dale Quarterley	10							5					5	11							143
32	Rita Goulet							14		16			16			17		Wth	QL		14	143
33	Caleb Costner	24		21		13						15							14			133
34	Jason Kitzmiller	19		26	23						11	13										129
35	Mandy Chick **(R)**	5		24	12													9				126
36	Taylor Gray			7	3	3																120
37	Bryce Haugeberg	16	32	15				13														100
38	Bryan Dauzat	21		14		18					23											100
39	Casey Carden							17	18				25	17								99
40	Dale Shearer									18			19			19			24			96
41	Kevin Hinckle			30	21													16		14		95
42	Stephanie Moyer					17					14										10	91
43	Mike Basham												24						32	18	17	85
44	Zach Herrin	33							9					8								82
45	Matt Kemp						13			19								20				80
46	Grant Enfinger					4										5						79
47	Kelly Kovski														4		6					78
48	Nate Moeller												23							19	13	77
49	D. L. Wilson		24										15						16			77
50	Tim Goulet						12					16							28			76
51	Dallas Frueh														17	22	17					76
52	Tim Richmond	36		25					19					22								74
53	Amber Balcaen	6		31	22																	73
54	Will Kimmel																3			13		72
55	Kris Wright											11		6								72
56	Gage Rodgers	26			25							9										72
57	Todd Souza		11						7													70
58	Jason White	9		10																		70
59	Landen Lewis		2																20			68
60	Chuck Buchanan Jr.	28				Wth					18								19			67
61	Logan Misuraca	18		28							25											67
62	Willie Mullins	20						8														60
63	Ryan Roulette		Wth					12											18			58
64	Steve Lewis Jr.	13		22																		53
65	Tyler Ankrum								1*													48
66	Jeff Smith						17					23										48
67	Tyler Reif		1																			47
68	Connor Zilisch													2*								44
69	Carson Kvapil																	2				42
70	Bradley Erickson		3																			41
71	Bret Holmes			3																		41
72	Kyle Keller		5																			39
73	Conner Popplewell																			5		39
74	Davey Callihan							6														38
75	Morgen Baird											6										38
76	Ken Schrader														6							38
77	Mason Ludwig																				6	38
78	Landon Pembelton																		7			37
79	Leland Honeyman		8																			37
80	Taylor Reimer														8							36
81	Ryan Huff	37																15				36
82	Trevor Huddleston		9																			35
83	Stanton Barrett													9								35
84	Mamba Smith																				9	35
85	Roger Carter						11				Wth											33
86	Tanner Arms																		11			33
87	Tanner Reif		12																			32
88	Isaac Johnson												12									32
89	Darrell Basham																				12	32
90	Eric Caudell	34		23																		32
91	Corey LaJoie													**15**								31
92	Natalie Decker	14																				30
93	Eric Nascimento		14																			30
94	Bob Schacht								14					Wth								30
95	Jeffery MacZink											14										30
96	Rick Redig-Tackman															14						30
97	Patrick Emerling			16																		28
98	Clayton Weatherman																16					28
99	Robby Lyons	17																				27
100	David Smith		17																			27
101	Matt Wilson				17																	27
102	Josh Reaume				18																	26
103	Chris Martin Jr.												18									26
104	Parker Retzlaff													18								26
105	Ron Vandermeir Jr.															18						26
106	Takuma Koga		19																			25
107	Jalen Mack							19		Wth												25
108	Kaden Honeycutt																		21			23
109	Don Thompson										22											22
110	Hunter Deshautelle	39		29																		20
111	Bobby Hillis Jr.		25																			19
112	Stephen Leicht					25																19
113	Ethan Nascimento		26																			18
114	C. J. McLaughlin					26																18
115	R. J. Smotherman		29																			15
116	Miguel Gomes	31																				13
117	Matt Gould																		31			13
	Kevin Campbell	Wth		Wth																		
	Chris Golden																QL					

== See also ==
- 2023 NASCAR Cup Series
- 2023 NASCAR Xfinity Series
- 2023 NASCAR Craftsman Truck Series
- 2023 ARCA Menards Series East
- 2023 ARCA Menards Series West
- 2023 NASCAR Whelen Modified Tour
- 2023 NASCAR Pinty's Series
- 2023 NASCAR Mexico Series
- 2023 NASCAR Whelen Euro Series
- 2023 NASCAR Brasil Sprint Race
- 2023 SRX Series
- 2023 CARS Tour
- 2023 SMART Modified Tour
- 2023 ASA STARS National Tour
