= 2023 Henry Ford Health 200 =

11th race of the 2023 ARCA Menards Series

Race details
- Race 11 of 20 of the 2023 ARCA Menards Series
- Date: August 4, 2023
- Official name: 35th Annual Henry Ford Health 200
- Location: Michigan International Speedway, Brooklyn, Michigan
- Course: Permanent racing facility
- Course length: 3.2 km (2.0 miles)
- Distance: 105 laps, 210 mi (337 km)
- Scheduled distance: 100 laps, 200 mi (320 km)
- Average speed: 124.589 mph (200.507 km/h)

Pole position
Driver	Andrés Pérez de Lara	Rev Racing
- Time: 39.001

Most laps led
Driver	Andrés Pérez de Lara	Rev Racing
- Laps: 43

Winner
No. 20	Jesse Love	Venturini Motorsports

Television in the United States
- Network: FS1
- Announcers: Jamie Little, Phil Parsons, and Trevor Bayne

Radio in the United States
- Radio: MRN

The 2023 Henry Ford Health 200 was the 11th stock car race of the 2023 ARCA Menards Series season and the 35th iteration of the event. The race was held on Friday, August 4, 2023, in Brooklyn, Michigan at Michigan International Speedway, a 2.0 mile (3.2 km) permanent quad-oval-shaped racetrack. The race was initially scheduled to be contested over 100 laps but was extended to 105 laps due to numerous NASCAR overtime attempts. Jesse Love, driving for Venturini Motorsports, would survive a chaotic one-lap shootout and hold off teammate Gus Dean to earn his eighth career ARCA Menards Series win and his sixth of the season. Andrés Pérez de Lara would dominate the majority of the race, starting from the pole and leading a race-high 43 laps, until his engine expired with under 10 laps to go. To fill out the podium, Dean, driving for Venturini Motorsports, and Connor Mosack, driving for Joe Gibbs Racing, would finish 2nd and 3rd, respectively.

== Background ==
Michigan International Speedway is a two-mile (3.2 km) moderate-banked D-shaped speedway located in Brooklyn, Michigan. The track is used primarily for NASCAR events. It is known as a "sister track" to Texas World Speedway as MIS's oval design was a direct basis of TWS, with moderate modifications to the banking in the corners, and was used as the basis of Auto Club Speedway. The track is owned by International Speedway Corporation. Michigan International Speedway is recognized as one of motorsports' premier facilities because of its wide racing surface and high banking (by open-wheel standards; the 18-degree banking is modest by stock car standards).

=== Entry list ===
- (R) denotes rookie driver.

#	Driver	Team	Make	Sponsor
2	Andrés Pérez de Lara (R)	Rev Racing	Chevrolet	Max Siegel Inc.
03	Alex Clubb	Clubb Racing Inc.	Ford	Clubb Racing Inc.
06	A. J. Moyer (R)	Wayne Peterson Racing	Ford	River's Edge Cottages & RV Park
10	Gage Rodgers	Fast Track Racing	Toyota	Volara Farm
11	Morgen Baird	Fast Track Racing	Toyota	Long Drink, Experience Jackson
12	Tim Monroe	Fast Track Racing	Ford	Fast Track Racing
15	Jake Finch	Venturini Motorsports	Toyota	Phoenix Construction
18	Connor Mosack	Joe Gibbs Racing	Toyota	Mobil 1
20	Jesse Love	Venturini Motorsports	Toyota	JBL
25	Gus Dean	Venturini Motorsports	Toyota	Dean Custom Air
30	Frankie Muniz (R)	Rette Jones Racing	Ford	Ford
31	Tim Goulet	Rise Motorsports	Chevrolet	Auto DNA Collision & Detail
32	Christian Rose (R)	AM Racing	Ford	West Virginia Tourism
48	Brad Smith	Brad Smith Motorsports	Ford	Copraya.com
49	Jeff Smith	Brad Smith Motorsports	Chevrolet	Copraya.com
55	Kris Wright	Venturini Motorsports	Toyota	FNB Corporation
65	Jeffery MacZink	MacZink Racing	Toyota	Syncon Flooring, Parkway Services
66	Jon Garrett (R)	Veer Motorsports	Chevrolet	Venture Foods
69	Scott Melton	Kimmel Racing	Toyota	Melton-McFadden Insurance Agency
72	Cody Coughlin	Coughlin Brothers Racing	Ford	JEGS, Cody Coughlin Company
73	Andy Jankowiak	KLAS Motorsports	Toyota	Dak's Market
93	Caleb Costner	Costner Weaver Motorsports	Chevrolet	Swidorski Brothers Trucking
97	Jason Kitzmiller	CR7 Motorsports	Chevrolet	A. L. L. Construction
Official entry list

== Practice ==
The first and only practice session was held on Friday, August 4, at 1:30 PM EST, and would last for 45 minutes. Connor Mosack, driving for Joe Gibbs Racing, would set the fastest time in the session, with a lap of 39.197, and an average speed of 183.688 mph (295.617 km/h).

Pos.	#	Driver	Team	Make	Time	Speed
1	18	Connor Mosack	Joe Gibbs Racing	Toyota	39.197	183.688
2	20	Jesse Love	Venturini Motorsports	Toyota	39.258	183.402
3	2	Andrés Pérez de Lara (R)	Rev Racing	Chevrolet	39.272	183.337
Full practice results

== Qualifying ==
Qualifying was held on Friday, August 4, at 2:30 PM EST. The qualifying system used is a single-car, one-lap system with only one round. Whoever sets the fastest time in that round wins the pole. Andrés Pérez de Lara, driving for Rev Racing, would score the pole for the race, with a lap of 39.001, and an average speed of 184.611 mph (297.103 km/h).

Pos.	#	Driver	Team	Make	Time	Speed
1	2	Andrés Pérez de Lara (R)	Rev Racing	Chevrolet	39.001	184.611
2	25	Gus Dean	Venturini Motorsports	Toyota	39.092	184.181
3	18	Connor Mosack	Joe Gibbs Racing	Toyota	39.129	184.007
4	15	Jake Finch	Venturini Motorsports	Toyota	39.253	183.425
5	20	Jesse Love	Venturini Motorsports	Toyota	39.324	183.094
6	55	Kris Wright	Venturini Motorsports	Toyota	39.514	182.214
7	30	Frankie Muniz (R)	Rette Jones Racing	Ford	39.520	182.186
8	73	Andy Jankowiak	KLAS Motorsports	Toyota	39.934	180.297
9	72	Cody Coughlin	Coughlin Brothers Racing	Ford	40.027	179.879
10	32	Christian Rose (R)	AM Racing	Ford	40.158	179.292
11	10	Gage Rodgers	Fast Track Racing	Toyota	40.802	176.462
12	69	Scott Melton	Kimmel Racing	Toyota	40.882	176.117
13	97	Jason Kitzmiller	CR7 Motorsports	Chevrolet	41.126	175.072
14	66	Jon Garrett (R)	Veer Motorsports	Chevrolet	41.276	174.436
15	11	Morgen Baird	Fast Track Racing	Toyota	41.866	171.977
16	93	Caleb Costner	Costner Weaver Motorsports	Chevrolet	41.918	171.764
17	65	Jeffery MacZink	MacZink Racing	Toyota	43.364	166.036
18	12	Tim Monroe	Fast Track Racing	Ford	45.081	159.713
19	03	Alex Clubb	Clubb Racing Inc.	Ford	45.763	157.332
20	06	A. J. Moyer (R)	Wayne Peterson Racing	Ford	46.562	154.633
21	48	Brad Smith	Brad Smith Motorsports	Ford	1:00.208	119.585
22	31	Tim Goulet	Rise Motorsports	Chevrolet	–	–
23	49	Jeff Smith	Brad Smith Motorsports	Chevrolet	–	–
Official qualifying results

== Race results ==
Fin	St	#	Driver	Team	Make	Laps	Led	Status	Pts
1	5	20	Jesse Love	Venturini Motorsports	Toyota	105	35	Running	47
2	2	25	Gus Dean	Venturini Motorsports	Toyota	105	18	Running	43
3	3	18	Connor Mosack	Joe Gibbs Racing	Toyota	105	9	Running	42
4	8	73	Andy Jankowiak	KLAS Motorsports	Toyota	105	0	Running	40
5	7	30	Frankie Muniz (R)	Rette Jones Racing	Ford	105	0	Running	39
6	15	11	Morgen Baird	Fast Track Racing	Toyota	105	0	Running	38
7	10	32	Christian Rose (R)	AM Racing	Ford	105	0	Running	37
8	9	72	Cody Coughlin	Coughlin Brothers Racing	Ford	105	0	Running	36
9	11	10	Gage Rodgers	Fast Track Racing	Toyota	105	0	Running	35
10	14	66	Jon Garrett (R)	Veer Motorsports	Chevrolet	105	0	Running	34
11	6	55	Kris Wright	Venturini Motorsports	Toyota	104	0	Running	33
12	4	15	Jake Finch	Venturini Motorsports	Toyota	103	0	Running	32
13	13	97	Jason Kitzmiller	CR7 Motorsports	Chevrolet	101	0	Engine	31
14	17	65	Jeffery MacZink	MacZink Racing	Toyota	100	0	Running	30
15	16	93	Caleb Costner	Costner Weaver Motorsports	Chevrolet	98	0	Running	29
16	22	31	Tim Goulet	Rise Motorsports	Chevrolet	96	0	Running	28
17	1	2	Andrés Pérez de Lara (R)	Rev Racing	Chevrolet	91	43	Engine	30
18	12	69	Scott Melton	Kimmel Racing	Toyota	80	0	Accident	26
19	21	48	Brad Smith	Brad Smith Motorsports	Ford	53	0	Mechanical	25
20	20	06	A. J. Moyer (R)	Wayne Peterson Racing	Ford	19	0	Mechanical	24
21	18	12	Tim Monroe	Fast Track Racing	Ford	8	0	Mechanical	23
22	19	03	Alex Clubb	Clubb Racing Inc.	Ford	4	0	Cylinder	22
23	23	49	Jeff Smith	Brad Smith Motorsports	Chevrolet	0	0	Puncture	21
Official race results

== Standings after the race ==
Drivers' Championship standings

	Pos	Driver	Points
	1	Jesse Love	563
1	2	Frankie Muniz	481 (-82)
1	3	Andrés Pérez de Lara	475 (-88)
	4	Christian Rose	465 (-98)
	5	Jon Garrett	420 (-143)
	6	A. J. Moyer	371 (-192)
1	7	Brad Smith	356 (-207)
1	8	Toni Breidinger	341 (-222)
	9	Tony Cosentino	276 (-287)
	10	Jack Wood	254 (-309)

- Note: Only the first 10 positions are included for the driver standings.

Previous race: 2023 Sunset Hill Shooting Range 150	ARCA Menards Series; 2023 season	Next race: 2023 Reese's 200
