= Jalen Mack =

American racing driver

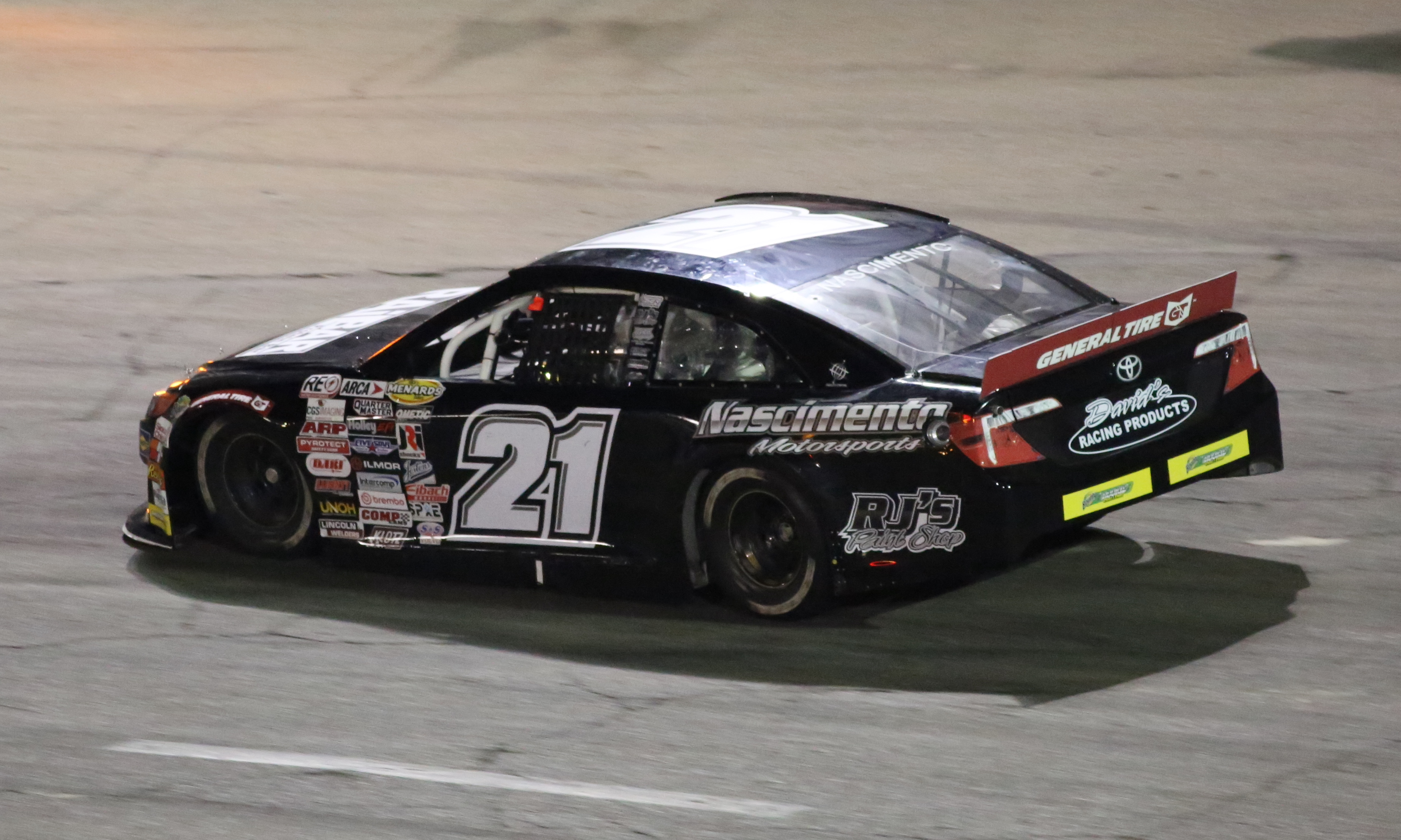
- Mack at the All American Speedway in 2023
- Born: August 5, 2005 (age 21); Los Angeles, California, U.S.

ARCA Menards Series career
- 1 race run over 1 year
- Best finish: 107th (2023)
- First race: 2023 Menards 250 (Elko)
Wins	Top tens	Poles
0	0	0

ARCA Menards Series West career
- 1 race run over 1 year
- Best finish: 60th (2023)
- First race: 2023 NAPA Auto Parts 150 (Roseville)
Wins	Top tens	Poles
0	0	0
- Statistics up to date as of October 11, 2023.

Jalen Mack (born August 5, 2005) is an American professional stock car racing driver who last competed part-time in the ARCA Menards Series West, driving the No. 72 Chevrolet for Strike Mamba Racing.

== Racing career ==
Mack began racing go-karts in 2013, where he instantly had success. During his karting career, Mack won over 50 races across several series including Superkarts USA, Rok Cup USA, and the International Karting Federation.

In 2016, Mack competed at the WSK World Championships driving for Formula One driver Daniel Ricciardo's karting team. It was also during this year that he was signed as a development driver for Phil Giebler Racing.

In 2020, Mack moved to Late Models however was limited to three races due to the effects of the COVID-19 pandemic. He was able to get a full season of Late Model racing the following year, where he would compete at several different tracks picking up multiple wins. Mack also made one start in the SRL Super Late Model division.

In 2022, Mack signed a driver developmental deal with Bill McAnally Racing, which included an opportunity to make his debut in the ARCA Menards Series at Irwindale Speedway. However, due to a scheduling conflict the entry was pulled from the event. A second entry at the Phoenix event was subsequently pulled after Mack got sick needing a overnight hospital stay two days prior to the event.

In 2023, it was revealed on the entry list for the first Irwindale Speedway event that Mack would make his debut in the ARCA Menards Series West, driving the No. 83 Chevrolet for his family-owned team, Mack Motorsports, in collaboration with Bill McAnally Racing, although they would withdraw from the event. Mack would then make his debut in the main ARCA Menards Series, driving the No. 43 Chevrolet for Tamayo Cosentino Racing at Elko Speedway, where he would finish nineteenth. He would then enter in the No. 83 at All American Speedway in the West Series, but would replace Ethan Nascimento in the No. 21 Toyota for Nascimento Motorsports after Nascimento suffered finger injuries that ruled him out of competing in the event, thus paving the way for Mack to make his official debut in the series. He would go on to finish nineteenth after running two laps due to overheating issues. Mack was scheduled to run two races in the family owned No. 83 car in the ARCA Menards Series West with a technical alliance from Bill McAnally Racing while also continuing to run Late Models with Kyle Keller Driver Development. Mack was selected to the 2023 NASCAR Drive for Diversity program, but ultimately declined after not coming to an agreement. He would instead stay with Bill McAnally Racing as a development driver for the 2024 season.

== Personal life ==
Mack is the son of former Indy Pro Series and ARCA Menards Series driver Lloyd Mack, and the nephew of former Indy Racing League driver George Mack. He is also the older brother of NASCAR driver Jayda Mack

== Motorsports results ==
=== ARCA Menards Series ===
(key) (Bold – Pole position awarded by qualifying time. Italics – Pole position earned by points standings or practice time. * – Most laps led.)

ARCA Menards Series results
Year	Team	No.	Make	1	2	3	4	5	6	7	8	9	10	11	12	13	14	15	16	17	18	19	20	AMSC	Pts	Ref
2023	Tamayo Cosentino Racing	43	Chevy	DAY	PHO	TAL	KAN	CLT	BLN	ELK; 19	MOH	IOW; Wth	POC	MCH	IRP	GLN	ISF	MLW	DSF	KAN	BRI	SLM	TOL	107th	25	

==== ARCA Menards Series East ====
ARCA Menards Series East results
Year	Team	No.	Make	1	2	3	4	5	6	7	8	AMSEC	Pts	Ref
2023	Tamayo Cosentino Racing	43	Chevy	FIF	DOV	NSV	FRS	IOW; Wth	IRP	MLW	BRI	N/A	0	

==== ARCA Menards Series West ====
ARCA Menards Series West results
Year	Team	No.	Make	1	2	3	4	5	6	7	8	9	10	11	12	13	AMSWC	Pts	Ref
2023	Mack Motorsports	83	Chevy	PHO	IRW; Wth	KCR	PIR	SON	IRW; Wth	SHA	EVG	AAS; Wth					60th	25	
2023	Nascimento Motorsports	21	Toyota									AAS; 19	LVS	MAD	PHO		60th	25	
2026	Strike Mamba Racing	72	Chevy	KER; Wth	PHO	TUC	SHA	CNS	TRI	SON	PIR	AAS	MAD	LVS	PHO	KER	N/A	0	
