= Zach Herrin =

American stock car racing driver

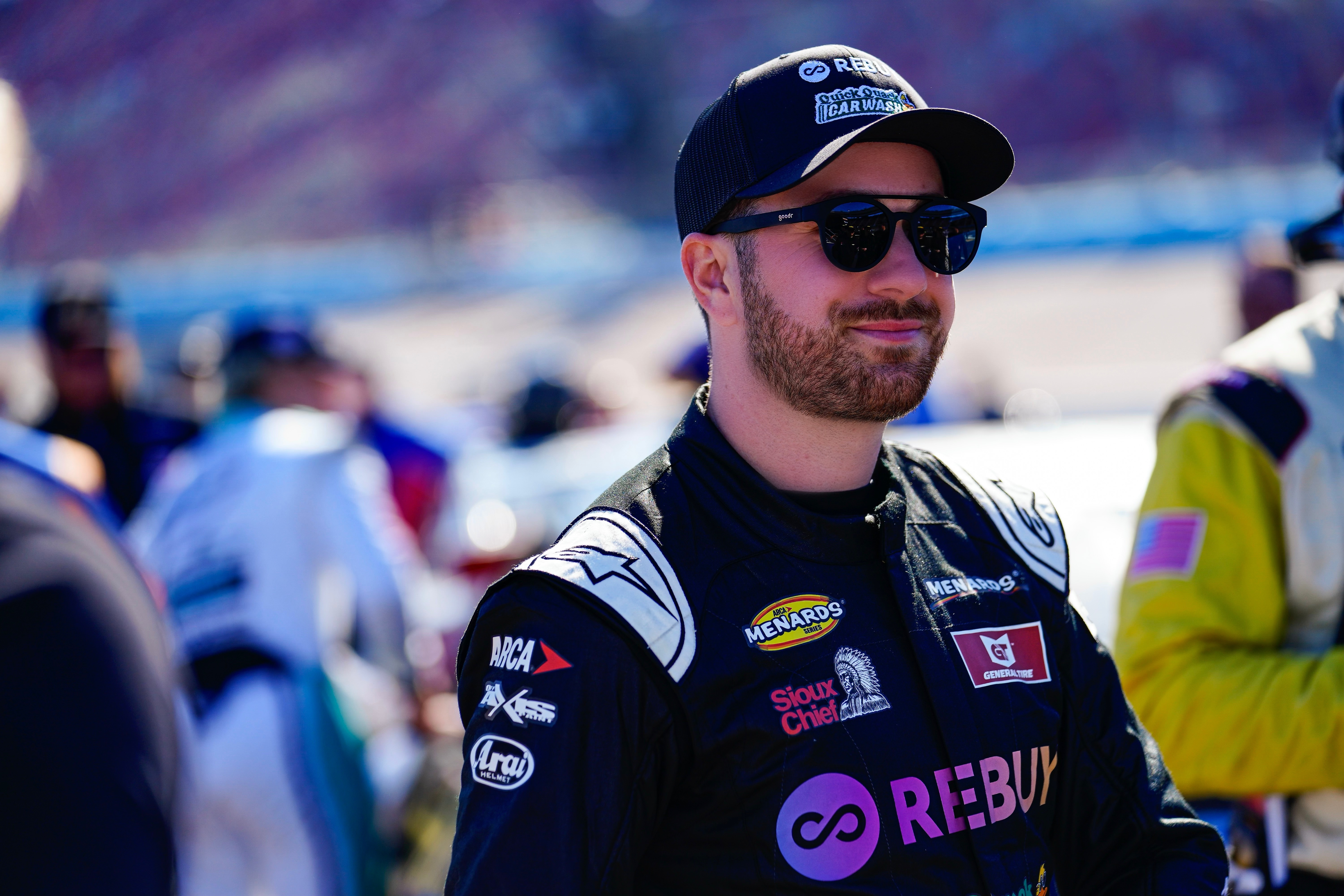
- Herrin at Phoenix Raceway in 2022
- Born: Zachary John Daniel Herrin; November 17, 1995 (age 30); Glendale, California, U.S.

ARCA Menards Series career
- 3 races run over 1 year
- Best finish: 44th (2023)
- First race: 2023 BRANDT 200 (Daytona)
- Last race: 2023 General Tire 100 at The Glen (Watkins Glen)
| Wins | Top tens | Poles |
|---|---|---|
| 0 | 2 | 0 |

ARCA Menards Series West career
- 1 race run over 1 year
- Best finish: 38th (2022)
- First race: 2022 Desert Diamond Casino West Valley 100 (Phoenix)
| Wins | Top tens | Poles |
|---|---|---|
| 0 | 0 | 0 |
- Statistics up to date as of August 22, 2023.

Zachary John Daniel Herrin (born November 17, 1995) is an American professional stock car racing driver who last competed part-time in the ARCA Menards Series driving the No. 12 Toyota for Fast Track Racing.

== Racing career ==
=== Early career ===
Born in Glendale, California, Herrin began racing motorcycles at the age of five, competing in amateur championships until the age of sixteen. In 2012, Herrin began his professional career in the AMA Pro SuperSport Championship. He then moved on to superkarts in 2013, competing in the SKUSA Pro Tour and SKUSA SuperNationals. In 2014, Herrin competed in legends cars in the INEX Winter Nationals series. For the 2016 season, Herrin returned to the SKUSA Pro Tour and SKUSA SuperNationals.

== Personal life ==
Herrin left the motorsports industry for four years after discovering that he needed time to realize his authentic self as a member of the LGBT community (he is openly gay). He began a career in real estate and in 2022 returned to motorsports competing in the 2022 ARCA Menards Series West finale at Phoenix Raceway.

He is the younger brother of former Moto2 rider and 2013 AMA Superbike champion Josh Herrin.

== Return to racing ==
=== ARCA Menards Series ===
On January 16, 2022, Herrin began his ARCA series career at the Daytona Pre-Season practice, driving for Fast Track Racing, marking his return to professional racing since coming out. He plans to compete in a limited schedule in the ARCA Menards Series in 2022, then expand to a larger ARCA/NASCAR schedule in 2023.

=== Racing Pride ===
Herrin is a member of the founding class of the North American expansion of Racing Pride.

=== Awards/Accolades ===
In 2023, Herrin was named to Out (magazine)'s 2023 Out100: a prestigious compilation of the year's most impactful and influential LGBTQ+ people. Zach is the first motorsports athlete to receive this honor.

In 2024, Herrin was honored by NASCAR's Drive for Diversity Awards in the "Developmental Series Driver" category. Herrin is "an exemplary advocate for LGBTQ+ people in the motorsports industry, integrating inclusion into his ethos through building partnerships with organizations such as Lambda Legal and representing the sport in a positive light both on and off the race track."

== Motorsports career results ==
=== ARCA Menards Series ===
(key) (Bold – Pole position awarded by qualifying time. Italics – Pole position earned by points standings or practice time. * – Most laps led. ** – All laps led.)

ARCA Menards Series results
| Year | Team | No. | Make | 1 | 2 | 3 | 4 | 5 | 6 | 7 | 8 | 9 | 10 | 11 | 12 | 13 | 14 | 15 | 16 | 17 | 18 | 19 | 20 | AMSC | Pts | Ref |
|---|---|---|---|---|---|---|---|---|---|---|---|---|---|---|---|---|---|---|---|---|---|---|---|---|---|---|
| 2023 | Fast Track Racing | 12 | Toyota | DAY; 33 | PHO | TAL | KAN | CLT | BLN | ELK | | | | | | | | | | | | | | 44th | 82 | |
| 2023 | Fast Track Racing | 11 | Toyota | | | | | | | | MOH; 9 | IOW | POC | MCH | IRP | GLN; 8 | ISF | MLW | DSF | KAN | BRI | SLM | TOL | 44th | 82 | |

==== ARCA Menards Series West ====
ARCA Menards Series West results
| Year | Team | No. | Make | 1 | 2 | 3 | 4 | 5 | 6 | 7 | 8 | 9 | 10 | 11 | AMSWC | Pts | Ref |
|---|---|---|---|---|---|---|---|---|---|---|---|---|---|---|---|---|---|
| 2022 | Fast Track Racing | 01 | Toyota | PHO | IRW | KCR | PIR | SON | IRW | EVG | PIR | AAS | LVS | PHO; 18 | 38th | 76 | |
