= Mason Ludwig =

American racing driver

- Born: September 16, 2002 (age 24); North Branch, Michigan, U.S.

ARCA Menards Series career
- 1 race run over 1 year
- Best finish: 77th (2023)
- First race: 2023 Shore Lunch 200 (Toledo)
Wins	Top tens	Poles
0	1	0
- Statistics up to date as of April 10, 2024.

Mason Ludwig (born September 16, 2002) is an American professional stock car racing driver who last competed part-time in the ARCA Menards Series, driving the No. 63 Chevrolet for Spraker Racing Enterprises.

== Racing career ==
Ludwig first started racing at the age of seven, and went on to win numerous races and championships. He has also competed in series such as the Southeast Limited Late Model Series, the Southeast Limited Late Model Series Challenger Division, and the Paramount Kia Big 10 Challenge Series.

On September 27, 2023, it was announced that Ludwig would make his ARCA Menards Series debut at Toledo Speedway, driving the No. 63 Chevrolet for Spraker Racing Enterprises. After placing ninth in the sole practice session, Ludwig went on to qualify in ninth and finish in sixth, two laps down behind race winner William Sawalich.

== Personal life ==
Ludwig graduated from Quest High School in North Branch, Michigan in 2021. He has a twin brother named Trenton, and they were both born 32 weeks gestation, and were both cared in the neonatal intensive care unit at Hurley Medical Center for two and a half weeks before being released.

Ludwig currently resides in Mooresville, North Carolina.

== Motorsports results ==
=== ARCA Menards Series ===
(key) (Bold – Pole position awarded by qualifying time. Italics – Pole position earned by points standings or practice time. * – Most laps led.)

ARCA Menards Series results
Year	Team	No.	Make	1	2	3	4	5	6	7	8	9	10	11	12	13	14	15	16	17	18	19	20	AMSC	Pts	Ref
2023	Spraker Racing Enterprises	63	Chevy	DAY	PHO	TAL	KAN	CLT	BLN	ELK	MOH	IOW	POC	MCH	IRP	GLN	ISF	MLW	DSF	KAN	BRI	SLM	TOL; 6	77th	38	
