= Gage Rodgers =

American racing driver

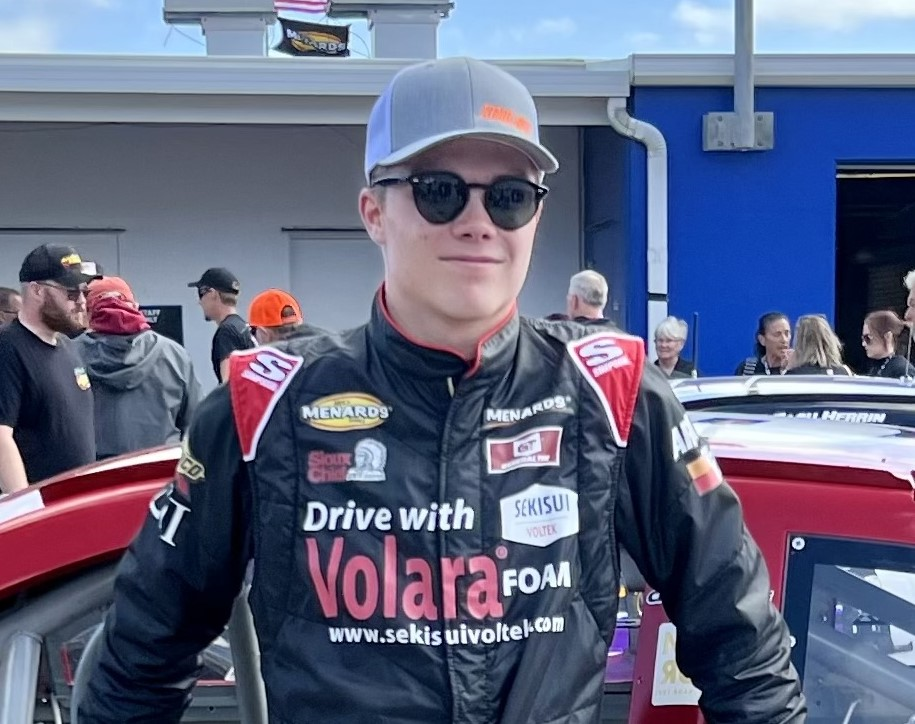
- Rodgers before the 2023 ARCA season-opener at Daytona
- Born: October 25, 2003 (age 23); Coldwater, Michigan, U.S.

ARCA Menards Series career
- 3 races run over 1 year
- Best finish: 56th (2023)
- First race: 2023 Brandt 200 (Daytona)
- Last race: 2023 Henry Ford 200 (Michigan)
Wins	Top tens	Poles
0	1	0
- Statistics up to date as of July 2, 2025.

Gage Rodgers (born October 25, 2003) is an American professional stock car racing driver who last competed part-time in the ARCA Menards Series driving the No. 68 Ford for Kimmel Racing and the No. 12 Chevrolet and No. 10 Toyota for Fast Track Racing.

== Racing career ==
Since the age of five, Rodgers had competed in various kart racing events at Daytona Speedweeks and the World Karting Association Grand Nationals. Through 2018 to 2021, he would compete in pro late model events across the Southeast United States driving for the Adkins Family Racing Team.

In 2022, Rodgers participated in pre-season testing for the ARCA Menards Series at Daytona International Speedway driving the No. 69 Ford for Kimmel Racing with a Legacy Roush-Yates engine in his car. He was able to obtain his ARCA Super Speedway license after turning in a lap speed of 175.956 mph, his best speed across the two days of testing.

Rodgers would return with the team for pre-season testing the following year, this time driving the No. 68, where he would finish 35th in the Friday session and 23rd in the Saturday session. He would then make his ARCA Menards Series debut with the team at the season opening race at Daytona a month later. After starting 37th, he would go on to finish on the lead lap in 26th. He would then join Fast Track Racing in the No. 12 Chevrolet at Kansas Speedway three months later, where he would finish 25th due to electrical issues.

== Personal life ==
Rodgers is a graduate of Coldwater High School, and is currently a Supply Chain student at Central Michigan University where he is a member of Sigma Pi fraternity.

== Motorsports career results ==
=== ARCA Menards Series ===
(key) (Bold – Pole position awarded by qualifying time. Italics – Pole position earned by points standings or practice time. * – Most laps led. ** – All laps led.)

ARCA Menards Series results
Year	Team	No.	Make	1	2	3	4	5	6	7	8	9	10	11	12	13	14	15	16	17	18	19	20	AMSC	Pts	Ref
2023	Kimmel Racing	68	Ford	DAY; 26	PHO	TAL																		56th	72	
2023	Fast Track Racing	12	Chevy				KAN; 25	CLT	BLN	ELK	MOH	IOW	POC											56th	72	
2023	Fast Track Racing	10	Toyota											MCH; 9	IRP	GLN	ISF	MLW	DSF	KAN	BRI	SLM	TOL	56th	72	
