= 2023 Herr's Snacks 200 =

6th race of the 2023 ARCA Menards Series

Race details
- Race 6 of 20 of the 2023 ARCA Menards Series
- Date: June 17, 2023
- Official name: 23rd Annual Herr's Snacks 200
- Location: Berlin Raceway, Marne, Michigan
- Course: Permanent racing facility
- Course length: 0.438 miles (0.705 km)
- Distance: 200 laps, 87.6 mi (140 km)
- Scheduled distance: 200 laps, 87.6 mi (140 km)
- Average speed: 103.804 mph (167.056 km/h)

Pole position
| Driver | Jesse Love | Venturini Motorsports |
- Time: 16.447

Most laps led
| Driver | Jesse Love | Venturini Motorsports |
- Laps: 197

Winner
| No. 18 | William Sawalich | Joe Gibbs Racing |

Television in the United States
- Network: FS1
- Announcers: Brent Stover and Phil Parsons

Radio in the United States
- Radio: ARCA Racing Network

The 2023 Herr's Snacks 200 was the sixth stock car race of the 2023 ARCA Menards Series season and the 23rd iteration of the event. The race was held on June 17, 2023, in Marne, Michigan, at Berlin Raceway, a 0.438 mile (0.705 km) permanent tri-oval shaped racetrack. The race took the scheduled 200 laps to complete. Close to the end, driver William Sawalich for Joe Gibbs Racing would win after passing Jesse Love for the lead with two laps to go, and held on to earn his first career win in the ARCA Menards Series. Love, who started on the pole, led 197 of the 200 laps until experiencing an issue with two laps to go. To fill out the podium, Love and Sean Hingorani, both driving for Venturini Motorsports, would finish second and third, respectively.

== Background ==
Berlin Raceway is a 7/16-mile-long paved oval race track in Marne, Michigan, near Grand Rapids. The track races weekly as part of the NASCAR Advance Auto Parts Weekly Series. It has also held touring series events on the ARCA Menards Series, ARCA Menards Series East, American Speed Association National Tour, USAC Stock Cars, USAC Silver Crown, World of Outlaws Sprint cars, and World of Outlaws Late Model Series tours.

=== Entry list ===
- (R) denotes rookie driver.

| # | Driver | Team | Make | Sponsor |
|---|---|---|---|---|
| 2 | Andrés Pérez de Lara (R) | Rev Racing | Chevrolet | Max Siegel Inc. |
| 03 | Roger Carter | Clubb Racing Inc. | Ford | Mosquito Mob Michigan |
| 06 | A. J. Moyer | Wayne Peterson Racing | Toyota | River's Edge Cottages & RV Park |
| 10 | Tim Monroe | Fast Track Racing | Toyota | Fast Track Racing |
| 11 | Zachary Tinkle | Fast Track Racing | Toyota | Racing for Rescues |
| 12 | Matt Kemp | Fast Track Racing | Ford | Lake Michigan College, PSS&C, RE/MAX |
| 15 | Sean Hingorani | Venturini Motorsports | Toyota | GearWrench |
| 18 | William Sawalich | Joe Gibbs Racing | Toyota | Starkey, SoundGear |
| 20 | Jesse Love | Venturini Motorsports | Toyota | JBL |
| 25 | Toni Breidinger | Venturini Motorsports | Toyota | FP Movement |
| 30 | Frankie Muniz (R) | Rette Jones Racing | Ford | ReSkills |
| 31 | Tim Goulet | Rise Motorsports | Chevrolet | DNA Collision & Detail |
| 32 | Christian Rose (R) | AM Racing | Ford | West Virginia Tourism |
| 45 | Tony Cosentino | Tamayo Cosentino Racing | Ford | Tamayo Cosentino Racing |
| 48 | Brad Smith | Brad Smith Motorsports | Ford | Copraya.com |
| 49 | Jeff Smith | Brad Smith Motorsports | Chevrolet | Copraya.com |
| 66 | Jon Garrett (R) | Veer Motorsports | Chevrolet | Venture Foods |
Official entry list

== Practice ==
The first and only practice session was held on June 17 at 4:30 PM EST, and would last for 45 minutes. William Sawalich, driving for Joe Gibbs Racing, would set the fastest time in the session, with a lap of 16.606 and an average speed of 94.845 mph (152.638 km/h).

| Pos. | # | Driver | Team | Make | Time | Speed |
|---|---|---|---|---|---|---|
| 1 | 18 | William Sawalich | Joe Gibbs Racing | Toyota | 16.606 | 94.845 |
| 2 | 15 | Sean Hingorani | Venturini Motorsports | Toyota | 16.956 | 92.887 |
| 3 | 20 | Jesse Love | Venturini Motorsports | Toyota | 17.045 | 92.402 |
Full practice results

== Qualifying ==
Qualifying was held on June 17 at 6:00 PM EST. The qualifying system used is a single-car, two-lap system with only one round. Whoever sets the fastest time in that round wins the pole. Jesse Love, driving for Venturini Motorsports, would score the pole for the race with a lap of 16.447 and an average speed of 95.762 mph (154.114 km/h).

| Pos. | # | Driver | Team | Make | Time | Speed |
|---|---|---|---|---|---|---|
| 1 | 20 | Jesse Love | Venturini Motorsports | Toyota | 16.447 | 95.762 |
| 2 | 18 | William Sawalich | Joe Gibbs Racing | Toyota | 16.492 | 95.501 |
| 3 | 15 | Sean Hingorani | Venturini Motorsports | Toyota | 16.698 | 94.323 |
| 4 | 25 | Toni Breidinger | Venturini Motorsports | Toyota | 16.877 | 93.322 |
| 5 | 32 | Christian Rose (R) | AM Racing | Ford | 16.881 | 93.300 |
| 6 | 2 | Andrés Pérez de Lara (R) | Rev Racing | Chevrolet | 16.902 | 93.184 |
| 7 | 11 | Zachary Tinkle | Fast Track Racing | Toyota | 17.014 | 92.571 |
| 8 | 30 | Frankie Muniz (R) | Rette Jones Racing | Ford | 17.082 | 92.202 |
| 9 | 45 | Tony Cosentino | Tamayo Cosentino Racing | Ford | 17.117 | 92.014 |
| 10 | 66 | Jon Garrett (R) | Veer Motorsports | Chevrolet | 17.290 | 91.093 |
| 11 | 03 | Roger Carter | Clubb Racing Inc. | Ford | 18.211 | 86.486 |
| 12 | 12 | Matt Kemp | Fast Track Racing | Ford | 18.247 | 86.316 |
| 13 | 10 | Tim Monroe | Fast Track Racing | Toyota | 18.249 | 86.306 |
| 14 | 31 | Tim Goulet | Rise Motorsports | Chevrolet | 18.546 | 84.924 |
| 15 | 06 | A. J. Moyer | Wayne Peterson Racing | Toyota | 19.214 | 81.971 |
| 16 | 48 | Brad Smith | Brad Smith Motorsports | Ford | 21.961 | 71.718 |
| 17 | 49 | Jeff Smith | Brad Smith Motorsports | Chevrolet | – | – |
Official qualifying results

== Race results ==
| Fin | St | # | Driver | Team | Make | Laps | Led | Status | Pts |
|---|---|---|---|---|---|---|---|---|---|
| 1 | 2 | 18 | William Sawalich | Joe Gibbs Racing | Toyota | 200 | 3 | Running | 47 |
| 2 | 1 | 20 | Jesse Love | Venturini Motorsports | Toyota | 200 | 197 | Running | 45 |
| 3 | 3 | 15 | Sean Hingorani | Venturini Motorsports | Toyota | 200 | 0 | Running | 41 |
| 4 | 6 | 2 | Andrés Pérez de Lara (R) | Rev Racing | Chevrolet | 199 | 0 | Running | 40 |
| 5 | 4 | 25 | Toni Breidinger | Venturini Motorsports | Toyota | 199 | 0 | Running | 39 |
| 6 | 8 | 30 | Frankie Muniz (R) | Rette Jones Racing | Ford | 198 | 0 | Running | 38 |
| 7 | 5 | 32 | Christian Rose (R) | AM Racing | Ford | 198 | 0 | Running | 37 |
| 8 | 9 | 45 | Tony Cosentino | Tamayo Cosentino Racing | Ford | 196 | 0 | Running | 36 |
| 9 | 7 | 11 | Zachary Tinkle | Fast Track Racing | Toyota | 196 | 0 | Running | 35 |
| 10 | 10 | 66 | Jon Garrett (R) | Veer Motorsports | Chevrolet | 194 | 0 | Running | 34 |
| 11 | 11 | 03 | Roger Carter | Clubb Racing Inc. | Ford | 175 | 0 | Running | 33 |
| 12 | 14 | 31 | Tim Goulet | Rise Motorsports | Chevrolet | 171 | 0 | Running | 32 |
| 13 | 12 | 12 | Matt Kemp | Fast Track Racing | Ford | 75 | 0 | Rear End | 31 |
| 14 | 15 | 06 | A. J. Moyer | Wayne Peterson Racing | Toyota | 75 | 0 | Too Slow | 30 |
| 15 | 16 | 48 | Brad Smith | Brad Smith Motorsports | Ford | 51 | 0 | Brakes | 29 |
| 16 | 13 | 10 | Tim Monroe | Fast Track Racing | Toyota | 15 | 0 | Clutch | 28 |
| 17 | 17 | 49 | Jeff Smith | Brad Smith Motorsports | Chevrolet | 2 | 0 | Mechanical | 27 |
Official race results

== Standings after the race ==
Drivers' Championship standings

| | Pos | Driver | Points |
|---|---|---|---|
| | 1 | Jesse Love | 292 |
| | 2 | Frankie Muniz | 268 (-24) |
| 1 | 3 | Andrés Pérez de Lara | 249 (-43) |
| 2 | 4 | Christian Rose | 239 (-53) |
| | 5 | Tony Cosentino | 239 (-53) |
| 2 | 6 | Toni Breidinger | 229 (-63) |
| 4 | 7 | Jack Wood | 214 (-78) |
| 1 | 8 | Jon Garrett | 205 (-87) |
| 2 | 9 | Greg Van Alst | 199 (-93) |
| | 10 | A. J. Moyer | 183 (-109) |

- Note: Only the first 10 positions are included for the driver standings.

| Previous race: 2023 General Tire 150 (Charlotte) | ARCA Menards Series; 2023 season | Next race: 2023 Menards 250 |
