= Casey Carden =

American racing driver (born 1989)

- Born: February 11, 1989 (age 37); Braselton, Georgia, U.S.

ARCA Menards Series career
- 11 races run over 4 years
- Best finish: 39th (2023)
- First race: 2022 Dawn 150 (Mid-Ohio)
- Last race: 2025 General Tire 100 at The Glen (Watkins Glen)
Wins	Top tens	Poles
0	0	0

ARCA Menards Series East career
- 2 races run over 2 years
- Best finish: 54th (2023)
- First race: 2023 Reese's 200 (IRP)
- Last race: 2024 Circle City 200 (IRP)
Wins	Top tens	Poles
0	0	0
- Statistics up to date as of August 8, 2025.

Casey Carden (born February 11, 1989) is an American professional stock car racing driver and team owner who last competed part-time in the ARCA Menards Series, driving the No. 86 Ford for Clubb Racing Inc.

== Racing career ==
Carden first began racing in go-karts, where he would win multiple championships before progressing to formula cars in the Sports Car Club of America. In 2014, he would compete in several events for series like the Lamborghini Super Trofeo and the Michelin Pilot Challenge. He would also go on to race in the American Endurance Racing Series with his own team, Casey Carden Motorsports, where they would win in their class seven times in 2017, eight times in 2018, and two times in 2019.

In 2022, Carden would make his debut in the ARCA Menards Series at Mid-Ohio Sports Car Course, driving the No. 3 Ford for Clubb Racing Inc., where he would finish 23rd after running one lap due to brake issues. He would make another start for the team at Watkins Glen International, this time in the No. 03, where he would finish on the lead lap in fifteenth. It was also during this year that he would run at the season ending race at Road Atlanta for Stoner Car Care Racing in the Michelin Pilot Challenge, driving the No. 09 Aston Martin alongside Ramin Abdolvahabi.

On December 2, 2022, it was announced that Carden would run up to five races for Clubb Racing Inc. in 2023, alongside plans for him to run full-time in 2024. He would make his oval track debut at Elko Speedway, where he would start fourteenth and finish seventeenth due to a valve spring issue. He returned for the following race at Mid-Ohio, where he would finish eighteenth due to an accident. He was scheduled to make his ARCA Menards Series East debut at Lucas Oil Indianapolis Raceway Park, which also served as a companion event with the main ARCA series. He would end up withdrawing from the race due to an engine failure in practice, and would be classified in 25th place. On August 15, it was announced that Carden would attempt to qualify for his NASCAR Xfinity Series debut for CHK Racing at Watkins Glen International.

== Personal life ==
Carden graduated from the University of Georgia with a degree in consumer economics.

== Motorsports results ==
=== NASCAR ===
(key) (Bold – Pole position awarded by qualifying time. Italics – Pole position earned by points standings or practice time. * – Most laps led.)

==== Xfinity Series ====
NASCAR Xfinity Series results
Year	Team	No.	Make	1	2	3	4	5	6	7	8	9	10	11	12	13	14	15	16	17	18	19	20	21	22	23	24	25	26	27	28	29	30	31	32	33	NXSC	Pts	Ref
2023	CHK Racing	74	Chevy	DAY	CAL	LVS	PHO	ATL	COA	RCH	MAR	TAL	DOV	DAR	CLT	PIR	SON	NSH	CSC	ATL	NHA	POC	ROA	MCH	IRC	GLN; DNQ	DAY	DAR	KAN	BRI	TEX	ROV	LVS	HOM	MAR	PHO	N/A	0	

=== ARCA Menards Series ===
(key) (Bold – Pole position awarded by qualifying time. Italics – Pole position earned by points standings or practice time. * – Most laps led.)

ARCA Menards Series results
Year	Team	No.	Make	1	2	3	4	5	6	7	8	9	10	11	12	13	14	15	16	17	18	19	20	AMSC	Pts	Ref
2022	Clubb Racing Inc.	3	Ford	DAY	PHO	TAL	KAN	CLT	IOW	BLN	ELK	MOH; 23	POC	IRP	MCH									65th	50	
2022	Clubb Racing Inc.	03	Ford													GLN; 15	ISF	MLW	DSF	KAN	BRI	SLM	TOL	65th	50	
2023	Clubb Racing Inc.	03	Ford	DAY	PHO	TAL	KAN	CLT	BLN	ELK; 17	MOH; 18	IOW	POC	MCH	IRP; 25									39th	99	
2023	Rise Motorsports	31	Chevy													GLN; 17	ISF	MLW	DSF	KAN	BRI	SLM	TOL	39th	99	
2024	Rise Motorsports	31	Chevy	DAY	PHO	TAL; 26	DOV	KAN	CLT	IOW	MOH	BLN				MCH; 23	ISF	MLW	DSF	GLN	BRI	KAN	TOL	63rd	57	
2024	Clubb Racing Inc.	86	Ford										IRP; 26	SLM	ELK									63rd	57	
2025	Clubb Racing Inc.	86	Ford	DAY	PHO	TAL	KAN	CLT; 23	MCH	BLN	ELK	LRP	DOV	IRP	IOW	GLN; 14	ISF	MAD	DSF	BRI	SLM	KAN	TOL	77th	51	

==== ARCA Menards Series East ====
ARCA Menards Series East results
Year	Team	No.	Make	1	2	3	4	5	6	7	8	AMSEC	Pts	Ref
2023	Clubb Racing Inc.	03	Ford	FIF	DOV	NSV	FRS	IOW	IRP; 25	MLW	BRI	54th	19	
2024	Clubb Racing Inc.	86	Ford	FIF	DOV	NSV	FRS	IOW	IRP; 26	MLW	BRI	57th	18	
