= Mike Goudie =

Canadian racing driver (born 1959)

- Born: August 13, 1959 (age 67); Gravenhurst, Ontario, Canada

NASCAR Canada Series career
- 10 races run over 4 years
- Car no., team: No. 38 (RGR Motorsports)
- 2026 position: 29th
- Best finish: 29th (2026)
- First race: 2022 Pinty's 100 (Ohsweken)
- Last race: 2026 Delta Electrolyte 150 (Montmagny)
Wins	Top tens	Poles
0	0	0

ARCA Menards Series career
- 5 races run over 4 years
- Best finish: 91st (2021)
- First race: 1994 Pocono ARCA 150 (Pocono)
- Last race: 2022 Sprecher 150 (Milwaukee)
Wins	Top tens	Poles
0	0	0

ARCA Menards Series East career
- 1 race run over 1 year
- Best finish: 54th (2022)
- First race: 2022 Sprecher 150 (Milwaukee)
Wins	Top tens	Poles
0	0	0
- Statistics up to date as of September 13, 2026.

Michael Goudie (born August 13, 1959) is a Canadian professional stock car racing driver who competes part-time in the NASCAR Canada Series, driving the No. 38 Ford for RGR Motorsports.

In 1994, Goudie made his debut in the ARCA Hooters SuperCar Series at Pocono Raceway, driving the No. 38 Chevrolet for Lee Scott, where he started 12th and finished on the lead lap in 16th place. He made two more starts the following year, driving the No. 89 Chevrolet for Brian McClure at both Pocono events, finishing 32nd in the first race due to engine issues, and 36th in the second race due to electrical issues.

After 24 years away from the series, Goudie returned to drive the No. 11 Ford for Fast Track Racing at the DuQuoin State Fairgrounds dirt track, where he started fourteenth and finished 11th due to a crash midway through the race. In 2022, he would run the No. 44 Toyota for Ferrier McClure Racing at the Milwaukee Mile, which served as a joint event with the ARCA Menards Series East. After placing 18th in the lone practice session, he qualified in eighteenth but finished in 23rd due to suffering suspension issues midway through the race. It was also during this year where he made hid debut in the NASCAR Pinty's Series, where he drove the No. 38 Chevrolet at Ohsweken Speedway.

Goudie has also competed in series such as the RUSH Dirt Late Model Series, the Vanderlaan Building Products Northeast Late Model Alliance, the Go Nuclear Late Model Series, the APC United Late Model Series, and the Sweeney Chevrolet-Buick-GMC RUSH Weekly Series.

== Motorsports results ==
=== NASCAR ===
(key) (Bold – Pole position awarded by qualifying time. Italics – Pole position earned by points standings or practice time. * – Most laps led.)

==== Canada Series ====
NASCAR Canada Series results
Year	Team	No.	Make	1	2	3	4	5	6	7	8	9	10	11	12	13	14	Rank	Points	Ref
2022	Michael Goudie	38	Chevy	SUN	MSP	ACD	AVE	TOR	EDM	SAS	SAS	CTR	OSK; 19	ICAR	MSP	DEL		48th	25	
2023	Michael Goudie	38	Ford	SUN	MSP; 22	ACD	AVE	TOR	EDM	SAS	SAS	CTR				MSP; 18	DEL	35th	69	
2023	Michael Goudie	38	Chevy										OSK; 23	OSK	ICAR			35th	69	
2024	Ryan Goudie	38	Chevy	MSP; 30	ACD	AVE	RIS	RIS	OSK	SAS	EIR	CTR	ICAR	MSP; 24	DEL	AMS		54th	34	
2026	RGR Motorsports	38	Ford	MSP	ACD; 19	ACD; 16	RIS	AMS; 18	AMS; 18	CMP	EIR	EIR	CTR	MAR	ICAR	MSP	DEL	29th	105	

=== ARCA Menards Series ===
(key) (Bold – Pole position awarded by qualifying time. Italics – Pole position earned by points standings or practice time. * – Most laps led.)

ARCA Menards Series results
Year	Team	No.	Make	1	2	3	4	5	6	7	8	9	10	11	12	13	14	15	16	17	18	19	20	21	AMSC	Pts	Ref
1994	Lee Scott	38	Chevy	DAY	TAL	FIF	LVL	KIL	TOL	FRS	MCH	DMS	POC; 16	POC	KIL	FRS	INF	I70	ISF	DSF	TOL	SLM	WIN	ATL	N/A	0	
1995	Brian McClure	89	Chevy	DAY	ATL	TAL	FIF	KIL	FRS	MCH	I80	MCS	FRS	POC; 32	POC; 36	KIL	FRS	SBS	LVL	ISF	DSF	SLM	WIN	ATL	N/A	0	
2021	Fast Track Racing	11	Ford	DAY	PHO	TAL	KAN	TOL	CLT	MOH	POC	ELK	BLN	IOW	WIN	GLN	MCH	ISF; 11	MLW	DSF	BRI	SLM	KAN		91st	33	
2022	Ferrier McClure Racing	44	Toyota	DAY	PHO	TAL	KAN	CLT	IOW	BLN	ELK	MOH	POC	IRP	MCH	GLN	ISF	MLW; 23	DSF	KAN	BRI	SLM	TOL		112th	21	

==== ARCA Menards Series East ====
ARCA Menards Series East results
Year	Team	No.	Make	1	2	3	4	5	6	7	AMSEC	Pts	Ref
2022	Ferrier McClure Racing	44	Toyota	NSM	FIF	DOV	NSV	IOW	MLW; 23	BRI	54th	21	
