= Tanner Allen (racing driver) =

American racing driver (born 1998)

- Born: February 6, 1998 (age 28); Springville, Iowa, U.S.

ARCA Menards Series career
- 1 race run over 1 year
- Best finish: 106th (2022)
- First race: 2022 Calypso Lemonade 150 (Iowa)
Wins	Top tens	Poles
0	0	0

ARCA Menards Series East career
- 1 race run over 1 year
- Best finish: 53rd (2022)
- First race: 2022 Calypso Lemonade 150 (Iowa)
Wins	Top tens	Poles
0	0	0
- Statistics up to date as of January 29, 2025.

Tanner Allen (born February 6, 1998) is an American professional stock car racing driver who has competed in the ARCA Menards Series and the ARCA Menards Series East, having last driven the No. 10 Toyota for Fast Track Racing.

Allen has also previously competed in series such as the Stock Car Crown Summer Series, the POWRi Lucas Oil National Midget Series, the POWRi Lucas Oil West Midget Series, and the American Racing Drivers Club.

== Motorsports results ==
=== ARCA Menards Series ===
(key) (Bold – Pole position awarded by qualifying time. Italics – Pole position earned by points standings or practice time. * – Most laps led.)

ARCA Menards Series results
Year	Team	No.	Make	1	2	3	4	5	6	7	8	9	10	11	12	13	14	15	16	17	18	19	20	AMSC	Pts	Ref
2022	Fast Track Racing	10	Toyota	DAY	PHO	TAL	KAN	CLT	IOW; 20	BLN	ELK	MOH	POC	IRP	MCH	GLN	ISF	MLW	DSF	KAN	BRI	SLM	TOL	106th	24	

=== ARCA Menards Series East ===
ARCA Menards Series East results
Year	Team	No.	Make	1	2	3	4	5	6	7	AMSEC	Pts	Ref
2022	Fast Track Racing	10	Toyota	NSM	FIF	DOV	NSV	IOW; 20	MLW	BRI	53rd	20	
