= Mandy Chick =

American racing driver (born 2001)

- Born: Amanda Chick; October 17, 2001 (age 25); De Soto, Kansas, U.S.

ARCA Menards Series career
- 10 races run over 4 years
- Best finish: 35th (2023)
- First race: 2022 Reese's 200 (Indianapolis)
- Last race: 2025 Berlin ARCA 200 (Berlin)
Wins	Top tens	Poles
0	2	0

ARCA Menards Series East career
- 1 race run over 1 year
- Best finish: 51st (2022)
- First race: 2022 Sprecher 150 (Milwaukee)
Wins	Top tens	Poles
0	0	0
- Statistics up to date as of June 22, 2025.

Amanda "Mandy" Chick (born October 17, 2001) is an American professional stock car racing driver who last competed part-time in the ARCA Menards Series, driving the No. 67 Chevrolet SS for Maples Motorsports.

== Racing career ==
Chick first began her racing career after completing ten laps at a quarter-midget track in Topeka, Kansas when she was six. She then became a champion in the TKQMA Honda Jr. championship in the Honda and Stock divisions in 2010 before finishing in the top five in the standings in the USAC Generation Series in 2012 and 2013.

In 2017, Chick ran six races in the CRA JEGS All Star Tour, where she would finish in the top-ten in three races. She would run the majority of the races the following year, and finished fourth in the points with three top tens. In 2019, she would finish second in the points with seven top-tens, including a top five at Bristol Motor Speedway. She would compete in eight of the ten races in 2020, finishing in the top-ten three times before running only five races the following year.

In 2022, Chick would make her ARCA Menards Series debut at Lucas Oil Indianapolis Raceway Park, driving the No. 74 Toyota for Team Chick Motorsports using equipment bought from Visconti Motorsports. After starting sixteenth, she would finish eighteenth due to a crash. She would make another start at Milwaukee Mile, where she would finish three laps down in sixteenth after starting fourteenth.

Chick opened the 2023 ARCA Menards Series season at Daytona International Speedway with a fifth place finish.

== Personal life ==
Chick is the daughter of former NASCAR Craftsman Truck Series owner Steve Chick Jr., who had fielded entries in the series from 2001 to 2006.

Chick is currently an engineering student at Rose-Hulman Institute of Technology.

== Motorsports career results ==
=== ARCA Menards Series ===
(key) (Bold – Pole position awarded by qualifying time. Italics – Pole position earned by points standings or practice time. * – Most laps led.)

ARCA Menards Series results
Year	Team	No.	Make	1	2	3	4	5	6	7	8	9	10	11	12	13	14	15	16	17	18	19	20	AMSC	Pts	Ref
2022	Team Chick Motorsports	74	Toyota	DAY	PHO	TAL	KAN	CLT	IOW	BLN	ELK	MOH	POC	IRP; 18	MCH	GLN	ISF	MLW; 16	DSF	KAN	BRI	SLM	TOL	62nd	54	
2023	Team Chick Motorsports	74	Chevy	DAY; 5	PHO	TAL; 24	KAN; 12	CLT	BLN	ELK	MOH	IOW	POC	MCH	IRP	GLN	ISF	MLW	DSF	KAN; 9	BRI	SLM	TOL	35th	126	
2024	Team Chick Motorsports	74	Chevy	DAY; 34	PHO	TAL	DOV	KAN; 15	CLT	IOW	MOH	BLN	IRP	SLM	ELK	MCH	ISF	MLW	DSF	GLN	BRI	KAN; 11	TOL	52nd	72	
2025	Maples Motorsports	67	Chevy	DAY	PHO	TAL	KAN	CLT	MCH	BLN; 18	ELK	LRP	DOV	IRP	IOW	GLN	ISF	MAD	DSF	BRI	SLM	KAN	TOL	121st	26	

==== ARCA Menards Series East ====
ARCA Menards Series East results
Year	Team	No.	Make	1	2	3	4	5	6	7	AMSEC	Pts	Ref
2022	Team Chick Motorsports	74	Toyota	NSM	FIF	DOV	NSV	IOW	MLW; 16	BRI	51st	28	
