= Jonathan Shafer =

American racing driver (born 2005)

- Born: June 17, 2005 (age 21); Ashland, Ohio, U.S.

NASCAR FedEx Freight Truck Series career
- 3 races run over 1 year
- 2026 position: 127th
- Best finish: 44th (2023)
- First race: 2023 Long John Silver's 200 (Martinsville)
- Last race: 2023 Baptist Health Cancer Care 200 (Homestead)
Wins	Top tens	Poles
0	0	0

ARCA Menards Series career
- 1 race run over 1 year
- Best finish: 75th (2022)
- First race: 2022 Calypso Lemonade 150 (Iowa)
Wins	Top tens	Poles
0	1	0

ARCA Menards Series East career
- 2 races run over 1 year
- Best finish: 22nd (2022)
- First race: 2022 General Tire 125 (Dover)
- Last race: 2022 Calypso Lemonade 150 (Iowa)
Wins	Top tens	Poles
0	2	0
- Statistics up to date as of November 6, 2026.

Jonathan Shafer (born June 17, 2005) is an American professional stock car racing driver. He last competed part-time in the NASCAR Craftsman Truck Series, driving the No. 69 Ford F150/Ram 1500 for MBM Motorsports. He is the son of former driver Todd Shafer.

== Racing career ==
=== Early career ===
Shafer would start driving at five years old, racing in quarter midgets. He would race in them for several years, getting wins and championships. In 2017, at the age of twelve, he would drive in the Champion Racing Association for two years. When he turned fourteen, he would drive micro sprints in the POWRi Midget Racing for Keith Kunz Motorsports, and continue to run late model races.

=== CARS Late Model Stock Tour ===
Shafer joined the CARS Late Model Stock Tour in 2020 for Nelson Motorsports, running all but one race that season, earning four top-tens and one top-five, ranking ninth in the final standings. He would sign with Lee Pulliam Motorsports to run a full-time schedule in 2021, getting six top-tens and four top-fives, finishing seventh in points.

=== ARCA Menards Series ===
On January 4, 2022, Shafer would sign with Venturini Motorsports to drive a part-time schedule in the 2022 ARCA Menards Series season. He made his first start in the East Series race at Dover Motor Speedway, starting eighth and finishing seventh. He made his second and final start of the season at Iowa Speedway, for the combination race with the main and East Series. He started seventh and finished fourth.

=== Craftsman Truck Series ===
On April 10, 2023, On Point Motorsports announced that Shafer would make his NASCAR Craftsman Truck Series debut at Martinsville Speedway, along with running seven more races for the team throughout the season. Shafer only ran two more races with the team, getting a best finish of 24th at Nashville Superspeedway.

In 2026, it was announced that Shafer will drive the No. 69 Ford for MBM Motorsports at Rockingham Speedway. He failed to qualify at Indianapolis; furthermore, the team was docked 25 driver and owner points and fined US$5,000 for a safety violation regarding the shift boot of the truck.

== Personal life ==
Shafer is the son of former NASCAR and ARCA driver, Todd Shafer, who primarily raced in the NASCAR Camping World Truck Series and NASCAR Busch Series (now NASCAR O'Reilly Auto Parts Series).

== Motorsports career results ==
=== NASCAR ===
(key) (Bold – Pole position awarded by qualifying time. Italics – Pole position earned by points standings or practice time. * – Most laps led.)

==== Craftsman Truck Series ====
NASCAR Craftsman Truck Series results
Year	Team	No.	Make	1	2	3	4	5	6	7	8	9	10	11	12	13	14	15	16	17	18	19	20	21	22	23	24	25	NCTC	Pts	Ref
2023	On Point Motorsports	30	Toyota	DAY	LVS	ATL	COA	TEX	BRD	MAR; 29	KAN	DAR	NWS	CLT	GTW	NSH; 24	MOH	POC	RCH	IRP	MLW	KAN	BRI	TAL	HOM; 26	PHO			44th	32	
2026	MBM Motorsports	69	Ford	DAY	ATL	STP	DAR	CAR; DNQ	BRI	TEX	GLN	DOV	CLT	NSH; DNQ	MCH	COR	LRP	NWS											127th	-25	
2026	MBM Motorsports	69	Ram																IRP; DNQ	RCH	NHA	BRI	KAN	CLT	PHO	TAL	MAR	HOM	127th	-25	

=== ARCA Menards Series ===
(key) (Bold – Pole position awarded by qualifying time. Italics – Pole position earned by points standings or practice time. * – Most laps led. ** – All laps led.)

ARCA Menards Series results
Year	Team	No.	Make	1	2	3	4	5	6	7	8	9	10	11	12	13	14	15	16	17	18	19	20	AMSC	Pts	Ref
2022	Venturini Motorsports	55	Toyota	DAY	PHO	TAL	KAN	CLT	IOW; 4	BLN	ELK	MOH	POC	IRP	MCH	GLN	ISF	MLW	DSF	KAN	BRI	SLM	TOL	75th	40	

==== ARCA Menards Series East ====
ARCA Menards Series East results
Year	Team	No.	Make	1	2	3	4	5	6	7	AMSEC	Pts	Ref
2022	Venturini Motorsports	55	Toyota	NSM	FIF	DOV; 7	NSV	IOW; 4	MLW	BRI	22nd	77	

=== CARS Late Model Stock Car Tour ===
(key) (Bold – Pole position awarded by qualifying time. Italics – Pole position earned by points standings or practice time. * – Most laps led. ** – All laps led.)

CARS Late Model Stock Car Tour results
Year	Team	No.	Make	1	2	3	4	5	6	7	8	9	10	11	12	13	14	15	16	CLMSCTC	Pts	Ref
2020	Nelson Motorsports	2S	Toyota	SNM; 9	ACE; 14	HCY; 20	HCY; 9	**DOM**; 4*	FCS; 8	LGY; 11	CCS; 16	FLO; 16	GRE							9th	193	
2021	Lee Pulliam Performance	91	Toyota	DIL; 18	HCY; 17	OCS; 23	ACE; 5	CRW; 12	LGY; 8	DOM; 15		MMS; 5	TCM; 6	FLC; 14	WKS; 3	SBO; 4				7th	288	
2021	Lee Pulliam Performance	25	Toyota								HCY; 11									7th	288	
2022	R&S Race Cars	91	Toyota	CRW; 22	HCY; 26	GPS; 18	AAS; 11	FCS	LGY; 7	DOM; 4		**ACE**; 1**	MMS	NWS; 4	TCM; 2	ACE; 7	SBO; 27	CRW		14th	245	
2022	R&S Race Cars	25	Toyota								HCY; 29									14th	245	
2023	N/A	91	Ford	SNM	FLC	HCY	ACE	NWS	LGY	DOM	CRW	HCY	ACE; 13	TCM	WKS	AAS	SBO	TCM	CRW	57th	20	
2025	Nelson Motorsports	12S	N/A	AAS	WCS	CDL	OCS	ACE	NWS; 25	LGY	DOM	CRW	HCY	AND	FLC	SBO	TCM	NWS		88th	17	

=== CARS Pro Late Model Tour ===
(key)

CARS Pro Late Model Tour results
Year	Team	No.	Make	1	2	3	4	5	6	7	8	9	10	11	12	13	CPLMTC	Pts	Ref
2024	Walker Motorsports	15	Chevy	SNM	HCY	OCS	ACE	TCM; 6	CRW; 9		NWS; 16	ACE	FLC	SBO	TCM	NWS	20th	98	
2024	Walker Motorsports	46	Chevy							HCY; 3							20th	98	
