= Michael Lira (racing driver) =

American racing driver (born 1997)

- Lira in 2015
- Born: July 16, 1997 (age 29); Daytona Beach, Florida, U.S.

NASCAR O'Reilly Auto Parts Series career
- 1 race run over 1 year
- 2016 position: 71st
- Best finish: 71st (2016)
- First race: 2016 U.S. Cellular 250 (Iowa)
Wins	Top tens	Poles
0	0	0

ARCA Menards Series career
- 31 races run over 6 years
- Best finish: 20th (2014)
- First race: 2013 Primera Plastics 200 (Berlin)
- Last race: 2022 Bush's Beans 200 (Bristol)
Wins	Top tens	Poles
0	6	0

ARCA Menards Series East career
- 2 races run over 1 year
- Best finish: 29th (2022)
- First race: 2022 Music City 200 (Nashville Fairgrounds)
- Last race: 2022 Bush's Beans 200 (Bristol)
Wins	Top tens	Poles
0	1	0
- Statistics up to date as of November 9, 2025.

Michael Lira (born July 16, 1997) is a Peruvian-American professional stock car racing driver.

== Early life and early career ==
Lira was born in Daytona Beach, Florida (Volusia County). He began his motorsports career racing quarter-midgets at Little New Smyrna Speedway, in New Smyrna Beach, Florida. When he turned 12, Lira started racing in the FASCAR Pro Trucks Series. When he was 15, he competed in both the FASCAR Pro Truck and Florida United Pro Truck Series. He was the 2012 New Smyrna Speedway Pro-Trucks Track Champion, and he tied for the Pro-Truck Track Championship at Orlando Speedworld.

== ARCA Racing Series ==
Lira began competing in the ARCA Racing Series in 2013, at the age of 16. He drove for Kimmel Racing, making his debut at Berlin Raceway on August 10. Lira competed in a total of four races with Kimmel Racing in 2013, and another 11 races with the team in 2014. His best finish in those two years was seventh at Salem Speedway. His best qualifying effort in those two years was fourth at Pocono Raceway.

Although not permitted to race in events at tracks over one mile in length due to track age restrictions, Before his 18th birthday, Lira participated in multiple ARCA Racing Series test sessions at Daytona International Speedway and one test at Talladega Superspeedway.

Switching to his family owned team of Lira Motorsports in 2015, Lira plans on competing in 16 of the 20 races on the ARCA Racing Series schedule. Age restrictions do not allow him to race at four of the tracks that have races scheduled before his 18th birthday. Through the first ten races of the year, Lira's best finish was eighth at Mobile International Speedway, and he qualified fourth at three different tracks (Nashville Speedway, Toledo Speedway and New Jersey Motorsports Park).

== IMSA and SCCA road course racing ==
Lira competed in a Sports Car Club of America (SCCA) road-course event at Daytona International Speedway in May 2014. In his first official SCCA start, he finished eighth overall and fourth in class.

In January 2015, Lira made his International Motor Sports Association (IMSA) Tudor United SportsCar Championship debut in the Rolex 24 at Daytona International Speedway driving for Muehlner Motorsports America. The car suffered from mechanical issues during the race and was brought to the garage four separate times for more than eight hours of race time. The car finished 17th in the Daytona-GTD Class.

Also in January 2015, Lira competed in the IMSA Continental Tire SportsCar Challenge BMW Performance 200 at Daytona International Speedway. In that race, he started eighth and finished 13th. He competed in a second IMSA Continental Tire SportsCar Challenge event, the Monterey Grand Prix at Mazda Raceway Laguna Seca, in May 2015. In that race, he started 15th and finished 14th with co-driver Nick Galante. Lira's third and final IMSA Continental Tire SportsCar Challenge race of 2015 was at Road Atlanta on October 2. In that race, Lira finished tenth along with co-driver David Levine.

== Family ==
Lira's father, Carlos Lira, is an accomplished sports car racer. He has been racing since the age of 18. He has earned five national championships in SCCA Ford Mustang road course competition. He also has experience in Grand Am, Rolex Sports Car Series and Pirelli World Challenge competition. Carlos Lira is a native of Lima, Peru.

== Motorsports career results ==
=== NASCAR ===
(key) (Bold – Pole position awarded by qualifying time. Italics – Pole position earned by points standings or practice time. * – Most laps led.)

==== Xfinity Series ====
NASCAR Xfinity Series results
Year	Team	No.	Make	1	2	3	4	5	6	7	8	9	10	11	12	13	14	15	16	17	18	19	20	21	22	23	24	25	26	27	28	29	30	31	32	33	NXSC	Pts	Ref
2016	B. J. McLeod Motorsports	15	Ford	DAY	ATL	LVS	PHO	CAL	TEX	BRI	RCH	TAL	DOV	CLT	POC	MCH	IOW	DAY	KEN	NHA	IND	IOW; 26	GLN	MOH	BRI	ROA	DAR	RCH	CHI	KEN	DOV	CLT	KAN	TEX	PHO	HOM	71st	15	

^{*} Season still in progress
^{1} Ineligible for series points

=== ARCA Menards Series ===
(key) (Bold – Pole position awarded by qualifying time. Italics – Pole position earned by points standings or practice time. * – Most laps led.)

ARCA Menards Series results
Year	Team	No.	Make	1	2	3	4	5	6	7	8	9	10	11	12	13	14	15	16	17	18	19	20	21	AMSC	Pts	Ref
2013	Kimmel Racing	69	Ford	DAY	MOB	SLM	TAL	TOL	ELK	POC	MCH	ROA	WIN	CHI	NJE	POC	BLN; 12	ISF	MAD; 13	DSF					41st	670	
2013	Kimmel Racing	68	Ford																		IOW; 18	SLM; 7	KEN	KAN	41st	670	
2014	Kimmel Racing	68	Ford	DAY	MOB; 9	SLM; 18	TAL	TOL; 9	NJE; 12	POC	MCH					POC; 10					SLM; 27	KEN; 16	KAN		20th	1750	
2014	Kimmel Racing	69	Ford									ELK; 14	WIN; 17	CHI	IRP; 12		BLN; 12	ISF	MAD	DSF					20th	1750	
2015	Lira Motorsports	58	Ford	DAY	MOB; 8	NSH; 9	SLM; 11	TAL	TOL; 17	NJE; 19	POC; 26	MCH	CHI	WIN; 24	IOW; 25	IRP; 31	POC	BLN	ISF	DSF	SLM	KEN	KAN		23rd	1220	
2016	Lira Motorsports	36	Ford	DAY	NSH	SLM	TAL	TOL; 12	NJE	POC	MCH; 29	MAD	WIN	IOW	IRP	POC	BLN	ISF							58th	415	
2016	Lira Motorsports	6	Ford																DSF; 14	SLM	CHI	KEN	KAN		58th	415	
2017	Lira Motorsports	6	Ford	DAY; 37	NSH; 18	SLM	TAL	TOL	ELK	POC	MCH	MAD	IOW	IRP	POC	WIN	ISF	ROA	DSF	SLM	CHI	KEN	KAN		83rd	185	
2022	Josh Williams Motorsports	60	Ford	DAY; 21	PHO	TAL	KAN	CLT	IOW	BLN	ELK	MOH	POC	IRP	MCH	GLN	ISF	MLW	DSF	KAN					66th	50	
2022	Josh Williams Motorsports	60	Chevy																		BRI; 17	SLM	TOL		66th	50	

==== ARCA Menards Series East ====
ARCA Menards Series East results
Year	Team	No.	Make	1	2	3	4	5	6	7	AMSWC	Pts	Ref
2022	Josh Williams Motorsports with Lira Motorsports	60	Ford	NSM	FIF	DOV	NSV; 7	IOW	MLW		29th	64	
2022	Josh Williams Motorsports with Lira Motorsports	60	Chevy							BRI; 17	29th	64	
