= Ashton Higgins =

American racing driver

- Born: October 8, 2002 (age 24); Weaverville, North Carolina, U.S.

ARCA Menards Series career
- 2 races run over 2 years
- Best finish: 88th (2026)
- First race: 2022 Bush's Beans 200 (Bristol)
- Last race: 2026 LiUNA! 150 (IRP)
Wins	Top tens	Poles
0	1	0

ARCA Menards Series East career
- 3 races run over 2 years
- Best finish: 31st (2022)
- First race: 2022 Pensacola 200 (Pensacola)
- Last race: 2026 LiUNA! 150 (IRP)
Wins	Top tens	Poles
0	2	0
- Statistics up to date as of September 26, 2026.

Ashton Higgins (born October 8, 2002) is an American professional stock car racing driver. He last competed part-time in both the ARCA Menards Series and ARCA Menards Series East, driving the No. 15 Toyota Camry for Nitro Motorsports. He has also competed in the CARS Pro Late Model Tour.

== Racing career ==
=== ARCA Menards Series East ===
Higgins made his ARCA Menards Series East debut in 2022. On the Race to Stop Suicide 200 at New Smyrna Speedway entry list, it was revealed that he would make his debut in a No. 49 car owned by himself, but he withdrew. Instead, he and his team debuted at the Pensacola 200 at Five Flags Speedway, finishing with a strong seventh place. Higgins and the No. 49 car also withdrew from the race at Nashville. Higgins and the No. 49 car would attempt the season-finale at Bristol, but finished in nineteenth due to a crash late in the race.

== Motorsports career results ==
=== Stock car career summary ===
Season	Series	Team	Races	Wins	Top 5	Top 10	Points	Position
2022	CARS Late Model Stock Car Tour	ALH Motorsports	3	0	0	0	60	35th
2022	ARCA Menards Series East	ALH Motorsports	2	0	0	1	62	31st
2022	ARCA Menards Series	ALH Motorsports	1	0	0	0	20	105th
2023	CARS Pro Late Model Tour	ALH Motorsports	13	0	2	6	293	**3rd**
2023	CARS Late Model Stock Car Tour	ALH Motorsports	1	0	0	0	2	89th
2024	CARS Pro Late Model Tour	ALH Motorsports	8	0	1	2	144	15th
2025	CARS Pro Late Model Tour	ALH Motorsports	3	0	0	1	81	24th
2026	CARS Pro Late Model Tour	ALH Motorsports	1	0	0	0	20	71st
2026	ARCA Menards Series East	Nitro Motorsports	1	0	0	1	36	51st
2026	ARCA Menards Series	Nitro Motorsports	1	0	0	1	36	88th

=== ARCA Menards Series ===
(key) (Bold – Pole position awarded by qualifying time. Italics – Pole position earned by points standings or practice time. * – Most laps led. ** – All laps led.)

ARCA Menards Series results
Year	Team	No.	Make	1	2	3	4	5	6	7	8	9	10	11	12	13	14	15	16	17	18	19	20	AMSC	Pts	Ref
2022	ALH Motorsports	49	Toyota	DAY	PHO	TAL	KAN	CLT	IOW	BLN	ELK	MOH	POC	IRP	MCH	GLN	ISF	MLW	DSF	KAN	BRI; 19	SLM	TOL	105th	25	
2026	Nitro Motorsports	15	Toyota	DAY	PHO	KAN	TAL	GLN	TOL	MCH	POC	BER	ELK	CHI	LRP	IRP; 8	IOW	ISF	MAD	DSF	SLM	BRI	KAN	88th	36	

==== ARCA Menards Series East ====
ARCA Menards Series East results
Year	Team	No.	Make	1	2	3	4	5	6	7	8	AMSEC	Pts	Ref
2022	ALH Motorsports	49	Toyota	NSM; Wth	FIF; 7	DOV	NSV; Wth	IOW	MLW	BRI; 19		31st	62	
2026	Nitro Motorsports	15	Toyota	HCY	CAR	NSV	TOL	IRP; 8	FRS	IOW	BRI	51st	36	

=== CARS Late Model Stock Car Tour ===
(key) (Bold – Pole position awarded by qualifying time. Italics – Pole position earned by points standings or practice time. * – Most laps led. ** – All laps led.)

CARS Late Model Stock Car Tour results
Year	Team	No.	Make	1	2	3	4	5	6	7	8	9	10	11	12	13	14	15	16	CLMSCTC	Pts	Ref
2022	ALH Motorsports	9	Chevy	CRW	HCY	GRE	AAS	FCS	LGY	DOM	HCY	ACE	MMS	NWS	TCM; 15	ACE; 11	SBO; 13	CRW		35th	60	
2023	ALH Motorsports	9	Chevy	SNM	FLC	HCY; 32	ACE	NWS	LGY	DOM	CRW	HCY	ACE	TCM	WKS	AAS	SBO	TCM	CRW	89th	2	

=== CARS Pro Late Model Tour ===
(key)

CARS Pro Late Model Tour results
Year	Team	No.	Make	1	2	3	4	5	6	7	8	9	10	11	12	13	CPLMTC	Pts	Ref
2023	ALH Motorsports	9	Chevy	SNM; 7	HCY; 8	ACE; 17	NWS; 14	TCM; 17	DIL; 5	CRW; 9	WKS; 10	HCY; 14	TCM; 5	SBO; 7	TCM; 12	CRW; 13	3rd	293	
2024	ALH Motorsports	9	Chevy	SNM; 25	HCY; 20	OCS; 12	ACE; 13	TCM; 13	CRW; 10	HCY	NWS; 27	ACE	FLC	SBO	TCM; 2	NWS	15th	144	
2025	ALH Motorsports	9	Chevy	AAS	CDL	OCS	ACE	NWS	CRW	HCY	HCY	AND; 9	FLC	SBO	TCM; 17	NWS; 19	24th	81	
2026	ALH Motorsports	9	Chevy	SNM; 22	NSV	CRW	ACE	NWS	HCY	AND	FLC	TCM	NPS	SBO			71st	20	
