= Matt Wilson (racing driver) =

American racing driver (born 1985)

- Born: Matthew Allen Wilson; May 8, 1985 (age 41); Springdale, Arkansas, U.S.

NASCAR O'Reilly Auto Parts Series career
- 1 race run over 1 year
- 2026 position: 67th
- Best finish: 67th (2026)
- First race: 2026 Mission 200 at The Glen (Watkins Glen)
| Wins | Top tens | Poles |
|---|---|---|
| 0 | 0 | 0 |

ARCA Menards Series career
- 4 races run over 3 years
- Best finish: 55th (2022)
- First race: 2022 General Tire 150 (Charlotte)
- Last race: 2025 General Tire 100 at The Glen (Watkins Glen)
| Wins | Top tens | Poles |
|---|---|---|
| 0 | 0 | 0 |

ARCA Menards Series East career
- 1 race run over 1 year
- Best finish: 45th (2022)
- First race: 2022 Music City 200 (Nashville Fairgrounds)
| Wins | Top tens | Poles |
|---|---|---|
| 0 | 1 | 0 |
- Statistics up to date as of November 7, 2026.

Matthew Allen Wilson (born May 8, 1985) is an American professional stock car racing driver. He last competed part-time in the NASCAR O'Reilly Auto Parts Series, driving the No. 35 Chevrolet SS for Joey Gase Motorsports with Scott Osteen. He has previously competed in the ARCA Menards Series and ARCA Menards Series East.

== Racing career ==
=== ARCA Menards Series East ===
Wilson made his ARCA Menards Series East debut in 2022 at the Nashville Fairgrounds Speedway, where he was originally scheduled to drive the No. 22 Chevrolet SS for CCM Racing. However, a mix-up occurred which the No. 22 withdrew, meaning Wilson would drive the No. 10 for Fast Track Racing with CCM as Tony Cosentino would replace Tim Monroe in the No. 12.

=== ARCA Menards Series ===
Wilson made his ARCA Menards Series debut in the 2022 General Tire 150 at Charlotte Motor Speedway, finishing twelfth. He returned with the team at Kansas Speedway later in the year, where he finished in fourteenth.

In 2023, Wilson returned with CCM Racing at Kansas, this time finishing in seventeenth place.

In 2025, it was revealed that Wilson would return to the series at Watkins Glen International, driving the No. 11 Toyota for Fast Track Racing.

== Motorsports career results ==
=== NASCAR ===
(key) (Bold – Pole position awarded by qualifying time. Italics – Pole position earned by points standings or practice time. * – Most laps led.)

==== O'Reilly Auto Parts Series ====
NASCAR O'Reilly Auto Parts Series results
| Year | Team | No. | Make | 1 | 2 | 3 | 4 | 5 | 6 | 7 | 8 | 9 | 10 | 11 | 12 | 13 | 14 | 15 | 16 | 17 | 18 | 19 | 20 | 21 | 22 | 23 | 24 | 25 | 26 | 27 | 28 | 29 | 30 | 31 | 32 | 33 | NOAPSC | Pts | Ref |
|---|---|---|---|---|---|---|---|---|---|---|---|---|---|---|---|---|---|---|---|---|---|---|---|---|---|---|---|---|---|---|---|---|---|---|---|---|---|---|---|
| 2026 | Joey Gase Motorsports with Scott Osteen | 35 | Chevy | DAY | ATL | COA | PHO | LVS | DAR | MAR | CAR | BRI | KAN | TAL | TEX | GLN; 37 | DOV | CLT | NSH | POC | COR | SON | CHI | ATL | IND | IOW | DAY | DAR | GTW | BRI | LVS | CLT | PHO | TAL | MAR | HOM | 67th | 1 | |

=== ARCA Menards Series ===
(key) (Bold – Pole position awarded by qualifying time. Italics – Pole position earned by points standings or practice time. * – Most laps led. ** – All laps led.)

ARCA Menards Series results
| Year | Team | No. | Make | 1 | 2 | 3 | 4 | 5 | 6 | 7 | 8 | 9 | 10 | 11 | 12 | 13 | 14 | 15 | 16 | 17 | 18 | 19 | 20 | AMSC | Pts | Ref |
|---|---|---|---|---|---|---|---|---|---|---|---|---|---|---|---|---|---|---|---|---|---|---|---|---|---|---|
| 2022 | CCM Racing | 7 | Toyota | DAY | PHO | TAL | KAN; Wth | CLT; 12 | IOW | BLN | ELK | MOH | POC | IRP | MCH | GLN | ISF | MLW | DSF | KAN; 14 | BRI | SLM | TOL | 55th | 62 | |
| 2023 | CCM Racing | 7 | Toyota | DAY | PHO | TAL | KAN; 17 | CLT | BLN | ELK | MOH | IOW | POC | MCH | IRP | GLN | ISF | MLW | DSF | KAN | BRI | SLM | TOL | 101st | 27 | |
| 2025 | Fast Track Racing | 11 | Toyota | DAY | PHO | TAL | KAN | CLT | MCH | BLN | ELK | LRP | DOV | IRP | IOW | GLN; 20 | ISF | MAD | DSF | BRI | SLM | KAN | TOL | 124th | 24 | |

==== ARCA Menards Series East ====
ARCA Menards Series East results
| Year | Team | No. | Make | 1 | 2 | 3 | 4 | 5 | 6 | 7 | AMSWC | Pts | Ref |
|---|---|---|---|---|---|---|---|---|---|---|---|---|---|
| 2022 | Fast Track Racing | 10 | Toyota | NSM | FIF | DOV | NSV; 9 | IOW | MLW | BRI | 45th | 35 | |
