= 2022 ARCA Menards Series East =

36th season of the ARCA Menards Series East

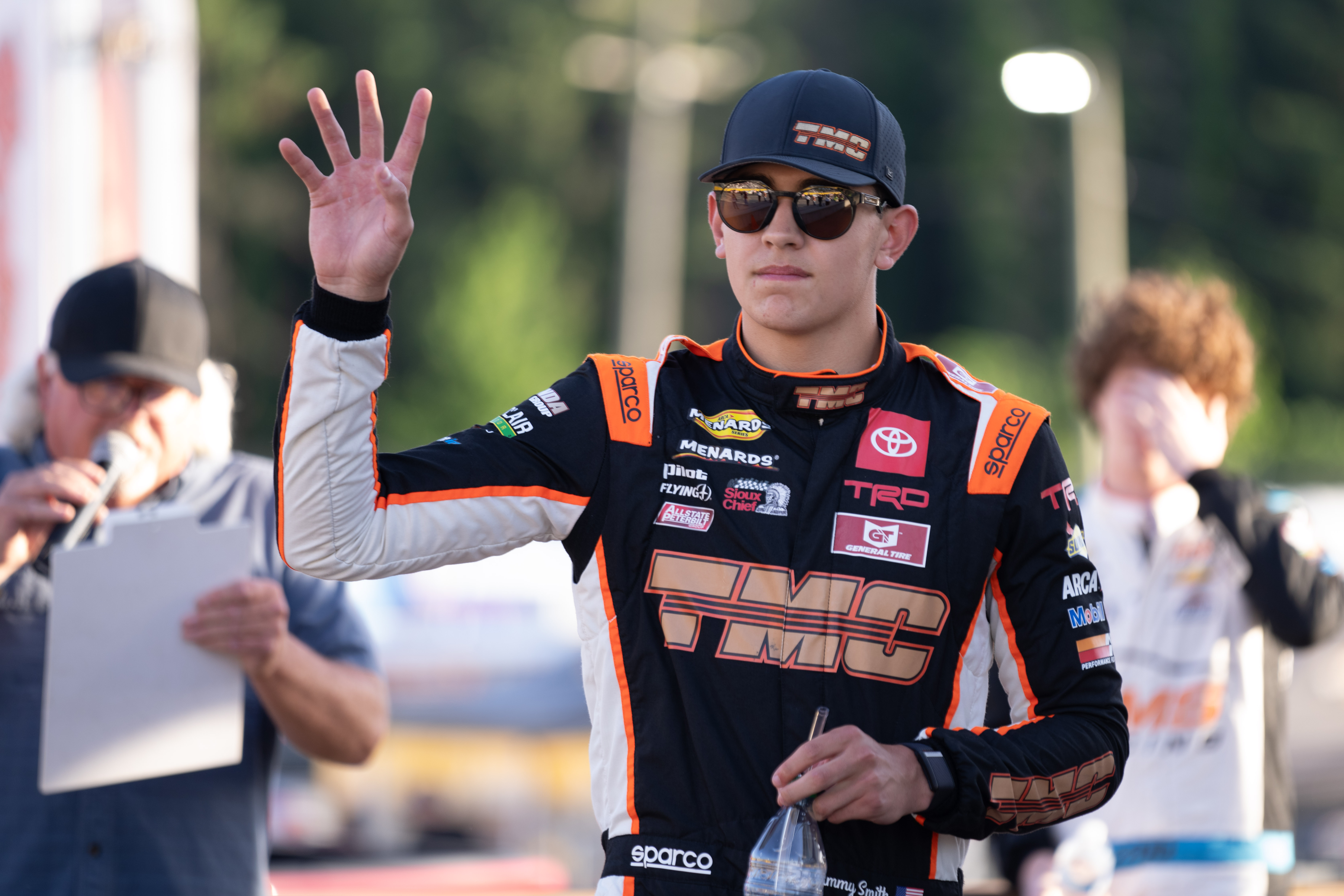
Sammy Smith, the 2022 ARCA Menards Series East champion.

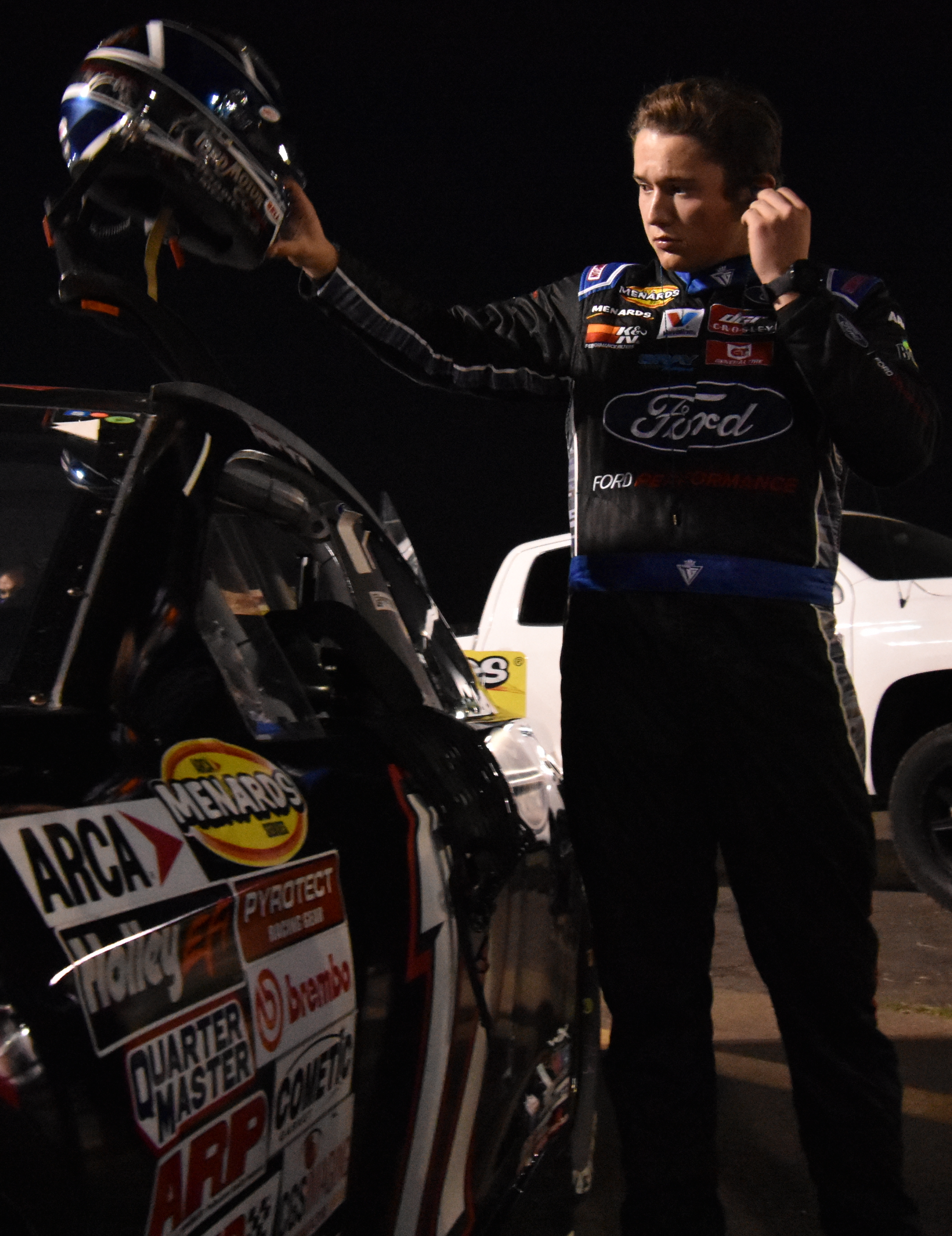
Taylor Gray finished second behind Smith in the championship by 40 points.

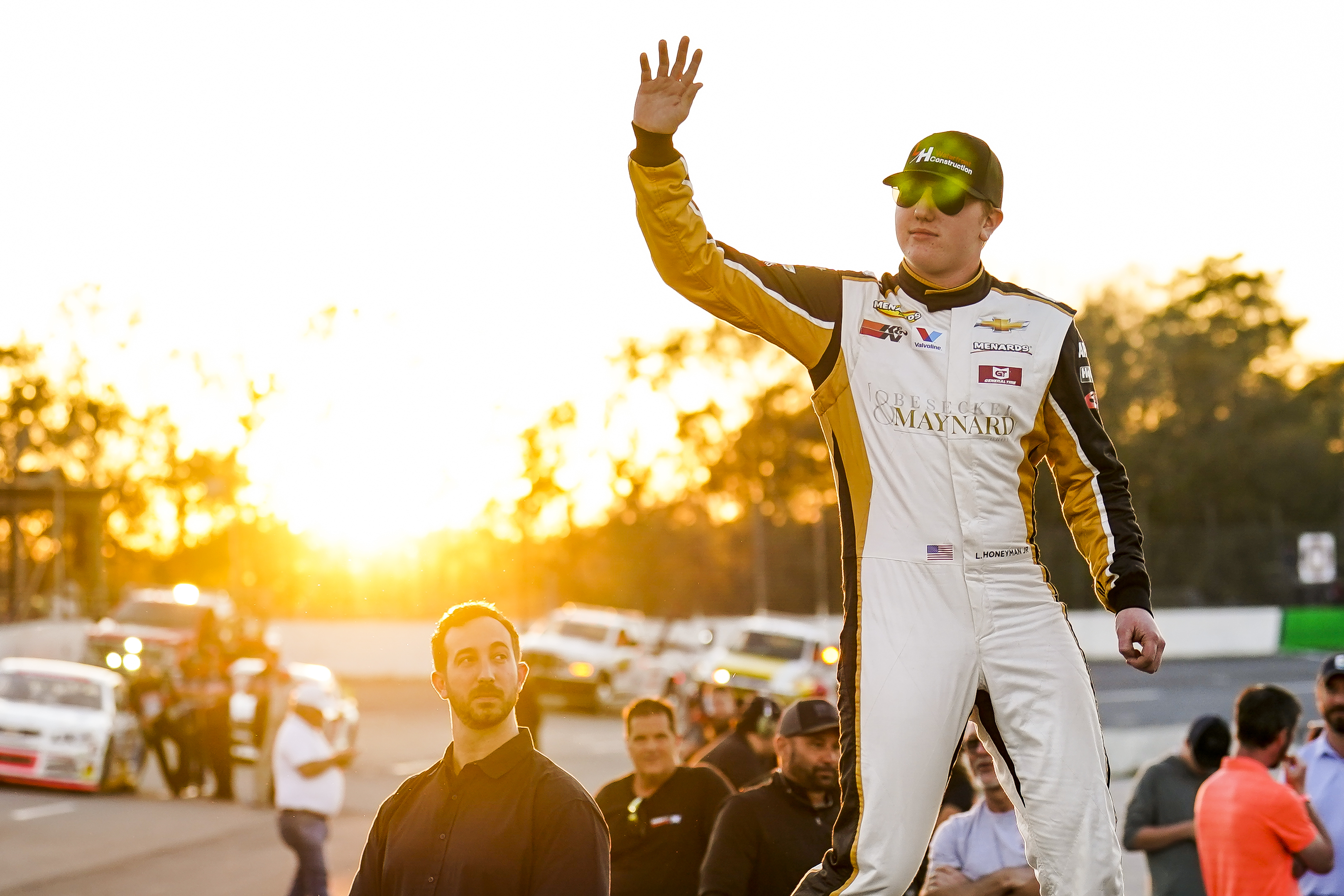
Leland Honeyman finished third in the championship.

The 2022 ARCA Menards Series East was the 36th season of the ARCA Menards Series East, a regional stock car racing series sanctioned by NASCAR in the United States. The season began on February 15 with the Race to Stop Suicide 200 at New Smyrna Speedway and ended on September 15 with the Sioux Chief Showdown 200 at Bristol Motor Speedway.

Sammy Smith entered the season as the defending champion. He moved up to the main ARCA Series to replace Ty Gibbs in the No. 18 car for Kyle Busch Motorsports (previously a Joe Gibbs Racing car in 2021) in most of the races after turning 18 (the minimum age to race at all tracks) on June 4, 2022. However, Smith continued to drive full-time in the East Series in the KBM No. 18.

The race at Milwaukee also featured six female drivers competing in the race (Amber Balcaen, Toni Breidinger, Mandy Chick, Stephanie Moyer, Amber Slagle, and Rita Thomason), a record for the East Series.

== Teams and drivers ==
=== Complete schedule ===
Manufacturer	Team	No.	Driver	Crew chief
Chevrolet	Brad Smith Motorsports	48	Brad Smith	Terry Strange 2 Jerry Willis 1 Leo Kryger 2 Carl Brown 1 Jeff Smith 1
Chevrolet	Young's Motorsports	02	Leland Honeyman (R)	Andrew Abbott
Ford	David Gilliland Racing	17	Taylor Gray	Chad Johnston
Toyota	Kyle Busch Motorsports	18	Sammy Smith	Mark McFarland
Toyota	Fast Track Racing	01	Stephanie Moyer	Mike Sroufe 4 Tim Monroe 1 Dallas Frueh 1
Toyota 7 (Note: Benny Chastain, the driver of the No. 10 Toyota for Fast Track Racing, crashed in practice for the race at Five Flags (race #2) and did not have a backup car. The team made a deal with Wayne Peterson Racing to renumber Nate Moeller's No. 06 Ford to the No. 10 and use their owner points in the race.) Ford 1	Fast Track Racing	10	Ed Pompa 1	Dick Doheny 2 Wayne Peterson 1 Tim Monroe 3 Jeremy Petty 1 Steven Barton 1
Toyota 7 Ford 1	Fast Track Racing	10	Benny Chastain 1	Dick Doheny 2 Wayne Peterson 1 Tim Monroe 3 Jeremy Petty 1 Steven Barton 1
Toyota 7 Ford 1	Fast Track Racing	10	Nate Moeller 1	Dick Doheny 2 Wayne Peterson 1 Tim Monroe 3 Jeremy Petty 1 Steven Barton 1
Toyota 7 Ford 1	Fast Track Racing	10	Tim Monroe 3	Dick Doheny 2 Wayne Peterson 1 Tim Monroe 3 Jeremy Petty 1 Steven Barton 1
Toyota 7 Ford 1	Fast Track Racing	10	Matt Wilson 1 (Note: Entry was fielded in a collaboration with CCM Racing.)	Dick Doheny 2 Wayne Peterson 1 Tim Monroe 3 Jeremy Petty 1 Steven Barton 1
Toyota 7 Ford 1	Fast Track Racing	10	Tanner Allen 1	Dick Doheny 2 Wayne Peterson 1 Tim Monroe 3 Jeremy Petty 1 Steven Barton 1
Toyota 3 Ford 3 Chevrolet 1	Fast Track Racing	11	Willie Mullins 2 (Note: Entries were fielded in a collaboration with Mullins Racing.)	Robert Bruce 2 Dick Doheny 2 Mike Sroufe 2 Andy Hillenburg 1
Toyota 3 Ford 3 Chevrolet 1	Fast Track Racing	11	Ed Pompa 1	Robert Bruce 2 Dick Doheny 2 Mike Sroufe 2 Andy Hillenburg 1
Toyota 3 Ford 3 Chevrolet 1	Fast Track Racing	11	Ryan Roulette 1 (Note: Entry was fielded in a collaboration with Last Chance Racing.)	Robert Bruce 2 Dick Doheny 2 Mike Sroufe 2 Andy Hillenburg 1
Toyota 3 Ford 3 Chevrolet 1	Fast Track Racing	11	Bryce Haugeberg 2 (Note: Entries were fielded in a collaboration with Haugeberg Racing.)	Robert Bruce 2 Dick Doheny 2 Mike Sroufe 2 Andy Hillenburg 1
Toyota 3 Ford 3 Chevrolet 1	Fast Track Racing	11	Zachary Tinkle 1	Robert Bruce 2 Dick Doheny 2 Mike Sroufe 2 Andy Hillenburg 1
Toyota 2 Chevrolet 4 Ford 1	Fast Track Racing	12	Tony Cosentino 2	Tony Cosentino 1 Tim Monroe 2 Trey Galgon 1 Dick Doheny 3
Toyota 2 Chevrolet 4 Ford 1	Fast Track Racing	12	Tim Monroe 1	Tony Cosentino 1 Tim Monroe 2 Trey Galgon 1 Dick Doheny 3
Toyota 2 Chevrolet 4 Ford 1	Fast Track Racing	12	Tommy Vigh Jr. 1	Tony Cosentino 1 Tim Monroe 2 Trey Galgon 1 Dick Doheny 3
Toyota 2 Chevrolet 4 Ford 1	Fast Track Racing	12	D. L. Wilson 2	Tony Cosentino 1 Tim Monroe 2 Trey Galgon 1 Dick Doheny 3
Toyota 2 Chevrolet 4 Ford 1	Fast Track Racing	12	Zachary Tinkle 1 (Note: Entry was fielded in a collaboration with Wayne Peterson Racing.)	Tony Cosentino 1 Tim Monroe 2 Trey Galgon 1 Dick Doheny 3

=== Limited schedule ===
Manufacturer	Team	No.	Driver	Crew chief	Rounds
Chevrolet	Bret Holmes Racing	23	Connor Mosack	Shane Huffman	3
Chevrolet	CCM Racing	7	Eric Caudell	Jeremy Petty	1
Chevrolet	CCM Racing	22	Steve Austin (R)	Jeremy Petty	2
Chevrolet	Costner Weaver Motorsports	95	Caleb Costner	Brian Bibeau	1
Chevrolet	GMS Racing	43	Daniel Dye	Chad Bryant	3
Chevrolet	McGowan Motorsports	24	Amber Slagle	Sean Samuels	1
Chevrolet	Niece Motorsports	40	Matt Gould	Phil Gould	1
Chevrolet	Rev Racing	2	Nick Sanchez	Matt Bucher	3
Chevrolet	Rev Racing	6	Rajah Caruth	Brad Parrott 2 Brad Means 2	4
Chevrolet	Richmond Motorsports	27	Tim Richmond	Darrell Phillips	1
Chevrolet	Tim Goulet Enterprises	31	Rita Thomason	Tim Goulet	1
Ford	Clubb Racing Inc.	03	Alex Clubb	Brian Clubb	3
Ford	David Gilliland Racing	51	Andrés Pérez de Lara	Derek Smith	1
Ford	Greg Van Alst Motorsports	35	Greg Van Alst	Jim Long	3
Ford	Rette Jones Racing	30	Max Gutiérrez	Mark Rette	1
Ford	Rette Jones Racing	30	Amber Balcaen	Mark Rette	3
Toyota	ALH Motorsports	49	Ashton Higgins	Tony Ponkauskas	2
Toyota	Jankowiak Motorsports	73	Andy Jankowiak	Mike Dayton	1
Toyota	Joe Gibbs Racing	81	Brandon Jones	Jeff Meendering 1 Jacob Canter 1	2
Toyota	MAN Motorsports	95	Tanner Arms	David Noble	2
Toyota	Mullins Racing	3	Mason Diaz	Austin Simmons	1
Toyota	Phoenix Racing	1	Jake Finch	Johnny Allen	3
Toyota	TC Motorsports	91	Justin Carroll	Terry Carroll	1
Toyota	Vanco Racing	66	Ron Vandermeir Jr.	Ron Vandermeir Sr.	1
Toyota	Venturini Motorsports	15	Conner Jones	Kevin Reed	2
Toyota	Venturini Motorsports	15	Landon Pembelton	Kevin Reed	1
Toyota	Venturini Motorsports	15	Parker Chase	Kevin Reed	1
Toyota	Venturini Motorsports	20	Jesse Love	Shannon Rursch	4
Toyota	Venturini Motorsports	25	Jake Finch (Note: Entry was fielded in a collaboration with Phoenix Racing.)	Kevin Reed Jr.	1
Toyota	Venturini Motorsports	25	Toni Breidinger	Kevin Reed Jr.	3
Toyota	Venturini Motorsports	55	Jonathan Shafer	Dave Leiner Jr.	2
Toyota	Venturini Motorsports	55	Conner Jones	Dave Leiner Jr.	1
Toyota	Visconti Motorsports 3 Team Chick Motorsports 1	74	Donald Theetge	John Visconti III	3
Toyota	Visconti Motorsports 3 Team Chick Motorsports 1	74	Mandy Chick	Steve Chick	1
Toyota 5 Chevrolet 1	Cook Racing Technologies	42	Christian Rose	Sean Samuels 4 John Holmes 2	6
Ford 5 Toyota 1	Ferrier McClure Racing 4 Vanco Racing 2 (Note: It was a Vanco Racing entry using Ferrier McClure Racing's owner points.)	44	Mason Diaz	Jeff McClure	1
Ford 5 Toyota 1	Ferrier McClure Racing 4 Vanco Racing 2	44	Brandon Varney	Jeff McClure	1
Ford 5 Toyota 1	Ferrier McClure Racing 4 Vanco Racing 2	44	Mason Mingus	Jeff McClure	1
Ford 5 Toyota 1	Ferrier McClure Racing 4 Vanco Racing 2	44	Ron Vandermeir Jr.	Jeff McClure	2
Ford 5 Toyota 1	Ferrier McClure Racing 4 Vanco Racing 2	44	Mike Goudie	Jeff McClure	1
Chevrolet 3 Ford 2	Josh Williams Motorsports with Lira Motorsports	60	Logan Misuraca	Tony Furr 1 John Holmes 3 Josh Williams 1	1
Chevrolet 3 Ford 2	Josh Williams Motorsports with Lira Motorsports	60	Daniel Escoto (R)	Tony Furr 1 John Holmes 3 Josh Williams 1	2
Chevrolet 3 Ford 2	Josh Williams Motorsports with Lira Motorsports	60	Michael Lira	Tony Furr 1 John Holmes 3 Josh Williams 1	2
Ford 1 Toyota 1	Wayne Peterson Racing	0	Zachary Tinkle	Michael Peterson	1
Ford 1 Toyota 1	Wayne Peterson Racing	0	Nate Moeller	Nate Moeller	1
Ford 3 Chevrolet 4	Wayne Peterson Racing 4 Richmond Motorsports 1 (Note: It was a Richmond Motorsports entry using Wayne Peterson Racing's owner points.)	06	Nate Moeller	Wayne Peterson 3 Unknown 1 Michael Peterson 1	2
Ford 3 Chevrolet 4	Wayne Peterson Racing 4 Richmond Motorsports 1	06	Zachary Tinkle	Wayne Peterson 3 Unknown 1 Michael Peterson 1	1
Ford 3 Chevrolet 4	Wayne Peterson Racing 4 Richmond Motorsports 1	06	Tim Richmond	Wayne Peterson 3 Unknown 1 Michael Peterson 1	1
Ford 3 Chevrolet 4	Wayne Peterson Racing 4 Richmond Motorsports 1	06	A. J. Moyer	Wayne Peterson 3 Unknown 1 Michael Peterson 1	1

=== Changes ===
==== Teams ====
- On August 30, 2021, Rev Racing confirmed that they will not field any full-time East Series cars in 2022 as they will now field 2 cars full-time in the main ARCA Series.
- On November 5, 2021, Alex Clubb announced that he would be starting his own ARCA team after having previously been a driver/co-owner of Tim Richmond's ARCA team until late in the 2021 season. His part-time schedule in his No. 03 car includes the combination races at Iowa and Milwaukee.
- On March 15, 2022, it was announced that Phoenix Racing would be returning to a NASCAR-sanctioned series for the first time since 2013 and Jake Finch, the son of team owner James Finch, would make his East Series debut at Five Flags Speedway in the team's No. 1 car. Finch and the team would also run the race at Nashville.
- On May 8, 2022, it was announced that Steve Austin, who previously drove for CCM Racing, would drive for a new team, T.C. Enterprises, full-time in 2023 with the possibility of partnering with another team to jointly field a car in some races in 2022.

==== Drivers ====
- On July 26, 2021, Taylor Gray stated to Mark Kristl from Frontstretch that he will return to the David Gilliland Racing No. 17 car full-time in 2022. Although he had plans to drive the car full-time in 2021, he only ran part-time after suffering an injury during the season.
- On August 30, 2021, it was announced that Rajah Caruth would drive full-time for Rev Racing in the main ARCA Series after driving full-time in the East Series in 2021.
- On October 29, 2021, GMS Racing announced that Daniel Dye would drive full-time in the main ARCA Series for the team after driving full-time in the East Series in 2021 for both them and Ben Kennedy Racing. On April 27, 2022, ARCA indefinitely suspended Dye due to his arrest on a felony battery charge in Volusia County, Florida. On May 13, ARCA announced that Dye would be reinstated after his charges were reduced by the Florida state attorney's office.
- On December 6, 2021, Steve Austin tweeted that he would be driving in the East Series for CCM Racing in the No. 22 car. He did not specify whether it would be full-time or part-time, although he has indicated that he and the team are trying to find sponsorship for him to run full-time and for Rookie of the Year. CCM team owner Eric Caudell was entered in the No. 22 car at Dover instead of Austin before withdrawing and Matt Wilson replaced Austin in the No. 22 at Nashville (until CCM withdrew the No. 22 and partnered with Fast Track Racing to jointly field the No. 10 car for Wilson in that race). On May 8, it was announced that Austin had left for, T.C. Enterprises, a new team that will run full-time in 2023 with the possibility of partnering with another team to jointly field a car in some races in 2022. On May 22, The Pit Lane revealed that Austin had been arrested on April 27 after a parole violation and has a history of legal issues (including identity theft as his real/legal name is Edward Hudson) and is a habitual felon. Despite this discovery, the sanctioning body has yet to officially announce that Austin will be suspended.
- On December 22, 2021, it was announced that Stephanie Moyer would run the full season in the No. 01 for Fast Track Racing after driving the majority of the 2021 season for the team.
- On January 18, 2022, it was announced that Caleb Costner would drive full time in the No. 14 for Last Chance Racing with Costner Motorsports. However, Costner only attempted New Smyrna for his own team Costner Weaver Motorsports.
- On January 28, 2022, it was announced that Leland Honeyman would run the full season in the No. 02 for Young's Motorsports.
- On the New Smyrna entry list, it was revealed that Ashton Higgins would make his debut in a No. 49 car owned by himself, but he withdrew. Instead, he and his team debuted at Five Flags. Higgins and the No. 49 car also withdrew from the race at Nashville. Higgins' 49 car would attempt the race at Bristol.
- Daniel Escoto was going to drive the No. 60 car for Josh Williams Motorsports in the season-opener at New Smyrna, but due to illness, he was replaced by Logan Misuraca. On March 15, 2022, it was announced that Escoto would run the remainder of the season in the car. However, Michael Lira would replace Escoto at Nashville. Lira would also attempt the season-finale at Bristol.
- On March 1, 2022, it was revealed that Tanner Arms would make his home-track debut at Nashville Fairgrounds Speedway. He would drive that car again at Bristol.
- On March 18, 2022, just after practice, Nate Moeller renumbered his No. 06 car to the No. 10 car for Fast Track Racing, since their normal driver Benny Chastain crashed his car in practice and had no backup.
- On April 1, 2022, it was revealed that Christian Rose would attempt 9 races in the main ARCA series, 5 races in the East Series, and 3 races in the West Series for Cook Racing Technologies.
- On May 25, 2022, it was announced that Brandon Jones would return to the East Series for the first time since 2019 as he would run two of the combination races with the main ARCA Series (Iowa and Bristol) in the No. 81 car for Joe Gibbs Racing. Although JGR sold their ARCA team to Kyle Busch Motorsports before the start of the 2022 season, this entry will be a JGR car and not a KBM car.

==== Crew chiefs ====
- On January 11, 2022, it was announced that Brad Parrott would be the crew chief for Rajah Caruth's No. 6 car for Rev Racing in 2022. Glenn Parker was Caruth's crew chief in 2021 when he ran part-time in the main ARCA Series and full-time in the East Series. His Rev Racing teammate Nick Sanchez also got a new crew chief for 2022, as Matt Bucher replaced Steve Plattenberger.

==== Manufacturers ====
- On October 7, 2021, a Frontstretch article revealed that Rev Racing would receive manufacturer support from Chevrolet in 2022, which they did not have in 2021 despite being a Chevrolet team.

== Schedule ==
Dover Motor Speedway announced their 2022 race date in a tweet on September 29. The rest of the schedule was announced on November 19.

Note: Races highlighted in gold are combination events with the ARCA Menards Series.

No	Race title	Track	Date
1	Race to Stop Suicide 200 presented by Place of Hope	New Smyrna Speedway, New Smyrna Beach, Florida	February 15
2	Pensacola 200	Five Flags Speedway, Pensacola, Florida	March 19
3	General Tire 125	Dover Motor Speedway, Dover, Delaware	April 29
4	Music City 200	Nashville Fairgrounds Speedway, Nashville, Tennessee	May 7
5	Calypso Lemonade 150	Iowa Speedway, Newton, Iowa	June 11
6	Sprecher 150	Milwaukee Mile, West Allis, Wisconsin	August 28
7	Bush's Beans 200	Bristol Motor Speedway, Bristol, Tennessee	September 15

=== Schedule changes ===
- The race at Southern National Motorsports Park was taken off the schedule and not replaced with another race at a different track, so there are now 7 races on the schedule instead of 8.
- The race at Five Flags Speedway moves from February to March.
- The race at Dover Motor Speedway moves two weeks earlier along with the weekend's Cup Series race, making it the third race of the season which makes the race at Nashville Fairgrounds Speedway (which is on the same weekend in 2022 that it was in 2021) the fourth race of the season.
- The combination race at Iowa Speedway moves from July to June.

=== Broadcasting ===
The TV lineup is similar to what it looked like in 2021, with NBC airing all of the non-combination races on tape delay, MAVTV airing the combination races at Iowa and Milwaukee, and Fox airing the season-finale at Bristol (which is also a combination race). However, USA Network will be the channel that the NBC races are aired on instead of NBCSN, which was shut down at the end of 2021.

NBC Sports TrackPass, which previously had the streaming rights to all of the NBC and MAVTV races, lost the rights to FloRacing. The Fox Sports App will stream the Bristol race.

== Results and standings ==
=== Race results ===
No.	Race	Pole position	Most laps led	Winning driver	Manufacturer	No.	Winning team
1	Race to Stop Suicide 200	Sammy Smith	Sammy Smith	Sammy Smith	Toyota	18	Kyle Busch Motorsports
2	Pensacola 200	Leland Honeyman	Sammy Smith	Sammy Smith	Toyota	18	Kyle Busch Motorsports
3	General Tire 125	Taylor Gray	Taylor Gray	Taylor Gray	Ford	17	David Gilliland Racing
4	Music City 200	Jake Finch	Sammy Smith	Sammy Smith	Toyota	18	Kyle Busch Motorsports
5	Calypso Lemonade 150	Jesse Love	Sammy Smith	Brandon Jones	Toyota	81	Joe Gibbs Racing
6	Sprecher 150	Sammy Smith	Sammy Smith	Sammy Smith	Toyota	18	Kyle Busch Motorsports
7	Bush's Beans 200	Sammy Smith	Sammy Smith	Sammy Smith	Toyota	18	Kyle Busch Motorsports

=== Drivers' championship ===
Notes:

- The pole winner also receives one bonus point, similar to the previous ARCA points system used until 2019 and unlike NASCAR.
- Additionally, after groups of five races of the season, drivers that compete in all five races receive fifty additional points. This points bonus was given after the race at Iowa.
  - Sammy Smith, Taylor Gray, Leland Honeyman, Stephanie Moyer and Brad Smith received this points bonus for having competed in the first five races of the season (New Smyrna, Five Flags, Dover, Nashville Fairgrounds, and Iowa).

(key) Bold – Pole position awarded by time. Italics – Pole position set by final practice results or rainout. * – Most laps led.

Pos	Driver	NSM	FIF	DOV	NSV	IOW	MIL	BRI	Points
1	Sammy Smith	**1***	1*	5	1*	2*	**1***	**1***	426
2	Taylor Gray	2	3	**1***	3	18	2	3	385
3	Leland Honeyman **(R)**	4	**2**	8	5	6	11	28	346
4	Stephanie Moyer	9	12	12	11	21	24	21	298
5	Brad Smith	15	14	11	13	15	21	24	295
6	Jake Finch		8	6	**2**		8	13	235
7	Christian Rose	11	10	10	12		15	22	234
8	Rajah Caruth			4		12	4	4	202
9	Jesse Love			2		**13**	7	10	197
10	Nick Sanchez					7	5	12	158
11	Daniel Dye					17	3	5	157
12	Greg Van Alst					8	9	14	151
13	Ron Vandermeir Jr.					9	13	11	149
14	Zachary Tinkle	DNS^{†}				22	20	20	148
15	Tim Monroe		13	14			26	30	143
16	Toni Breidinger					11	12	16	143
17	Amber Balcaen					10	14	31	127
18	Donald Theetge	5	9		8				110
19	Alex Clubb					16	28	29	109
20	Conner Jones			3		5		27	97
21	Brandon Jones					1		2	90
22	Jonathan Shafer			7		4			77
23	Connor Mosack					3		9	76
24	Nate Moeller		15		DNS^{†}		27		75
25	Willie Mullins	8	5						75
26	Daniel Escoto **(R)**		4	9					75
27	Tanner Arms				6			15	67
28	Steve Austin **(R)**	12	11						65
29	Michael Lira				7			17	64
30	Ed Pompa	10		15					63
31	Ashton Higgins	Wth	7		Wth			19	62
32	Tony Cosentino	14			14				60
33	Mason Diaz	6						25	57
34	Bryce Haugeberg					14	19		55
35	D. L. Wilson					19		18	51
36	Tim Richmond					23	17		48
37	Max Gutiérrez	3		Wth					41
38	Mason Mingus				4				40
39	Brandon Varney		6						38
40	Landon Pembelton						6		38
41	Parker Chase							6	38
42	Logan Misuraca	7							37
43	Andrés Pérez de Lara							7	37
44	Andy Jankowiak							8	36
45	Matt Wilson				9				35
46	Ryan Roulette				10				34
47	Matt Gould						10		34
48	Caleb Costner	13							31
49	Tommy Vigh Jr.			13					31
50	Mandy Chick						16		28
51	Amber Slagle						18		26
52	Tanner Allen					20			24
53	Eric Caudell			Wth			22		22
54	Mike Goudie						23		21
55	A. J. Moyer							23	21
56	Rita Thomason						25		19
57	Justin Carroll							26	18
	Andrew Tuttle	Wth							
	Benny Chastain		Wth^{‡}						
^{†} – Zachary Tinkle received the points of a 16th place finish for not starting the race at New Smyrna in March because he did turn a lap in qualifying for the race. The same rule would apply to Nate Moeller, who turned a lap in qualifying at Nashville Fairgrounds in May but did not start the race.^{‡} – Benny Chastain crashed in practice at Five Flags, meaning he was replaced by Nate Moeller.

== See also ==
- 2022 NASCAR Cup Series
- 2022 NASCAR Xfinity Series
- 2022 NASCAR Camping World Truck Series
- 2022 ARCA Menards Series
- 2022 ARCA Menards Series West
- 2022 NASCAR Whelen Modified Tour
- 2022 NASCAR Pinty's Series
- 2022 NASCAR Mexico Series
- 2022 NASCAR Whelen Euro Series
- 2022 SRX Series
- 2022 CARS Tour
- 2022 SMART Modified Tour
