= 2023 Dawn 150 =

4th race of the 2023 ARCA Menards Series

Race details
- Race 4 of 20 of the 2023 ARCA Menards Series
- Date: May 6, 2023
- Official name: 4th Annual Dawn 150
- Location: Kansas Speedway, Kansas City, Kansas
- Course: Permanent racing facility
- Course length: 1.5 miles (2.4 km)
- Distance: 100 laps, 150 mi (241 km)
- Scheduled distance: 100 laps, 150 mi (241 km)
- Average speed: 117.541 mph (189.164 km/h)

Pole position
Driver	Jesse Love	Venturini Motorsports
- Time: 30.785

Most laps led
Driver	Jesse Love	Venturini Motorsports
- Laps: 96

Winner
No. 20	Jesse Love	Venturini Motorsports

Television in the United States
- Network: FS1
- Announcers: Jamie Little, Phil Parsons, and Austin Cindric

Radio in the United States
- Radio: MRN

The 2023 Dawn 150 was the 4th stock car race of the 2023 ARCA Menards Series season, and the 4th iteration of the event. The race was held on Saturday, May 6, 2023, in Kansas City, Kansas at Kansas Speedway, a 1.5 mile (2.4 km) permanent tri-oval shaped racetrack. The race took the scheduled 100 laps to complete. Jesse Love, driving for Venturini Motorsports, would put on a dominating performance, leading a race-high 96 laps, earning his fourth career ARCA Menards Series win, and his second of the season. To fill out the podium, Dean Thompson, driving for Venturini Motorsports, and Taylor Gray, driving for Tricon Garage, would finish 2nd and 3rd, respectively.

== Background ==
Kansas Speedway is a 1.5-mile (2.4 km) tri-oval race track in Kansas City, Kansas. It was built in 2001 and hosts two annual NASCAR race weekends. The NTT IndyCar Series also raced there until 2011. The speedway is owned and operated by the International Speedway Corporation.

=== Entry list ===
- (R) denotes rookie driver.

#	Driver	Team	Make	Sponsor
0	Kevin Hinckle	Wayne Peterson Racing	Toyota	KH Automotive
01	Zachary Tinkle	Fast Track Racing	Ford	Fast Track Racing
2	Andrés Pérez de Lara (R)	Rev Racing	Chevrolet	Max Siegel Inc.
03	Alex Clubb	Clubb Racing Inc.	Ford	Yavapi Bottle Gas
06	A. J. Moyer	Wayne Peterson Racing	Ford	River's Edge Cottages & RV Park
6	Jack Wood	Rev Racing	Chevrolet	Velocity Racing
7	Matt Wilson	CCM Racing	Toyota	7 Brew Coffee
8	Sean Corr	Empire Racing	Ford	NESCO
10	Tim Monroe	Fast Track Racing	Ford	Fast Track Racing
11	Josh Reaume	Fast Track Racing	Ford	Cover Craft
12	Gage Rodgers	Fast Track Racing	Chevrolet	Volara Foam
15	Amber Balcaen	Venturini Motorsports	Toyota	ICON Direct
17	Taylor Gray	Tricon Garage	Toyota	Dead On Tools
18	Connor Mosack	Joe Gibbs Racing	Toyota	Mobil 1
20	Jesse Love	Venturini Motorsports	Toyota	GearWrench
25	Dean Thompson	Venturini Motorsports	Toyota	Thompson Pipe Group
30	Frankie Muniz (R)	Rette Jones Racing	Ford	Built Ford Proud
32	Christian Rose (R)	AM Racing	Ford	West Virginia Tourism
35	Greg Van Alst	Greg Van Alst Motorsports	Ford	CB Fabricating
45	Tony Cosentino	Tamayo Cosentino Racing	Chevrolet	Tamayo Sports Florida
48	Brad Smith	Brad Smith Motorsports	Chevrolet	Copraya.com
55	Toni Breidinger	Venturini Motorsports	Toyota	Victoria's Secret
66	Jon Garrett (R)	Veer Motorsports	Chevrolet	Lick 'Em Stick 'Em
69	Scott Melton	Kimmel Racing	Toyota	Melton-McFadden Insurance Agency
72	Cody Coughlin	Coughlin Brothers Racing	Ford	Jegs High Performance
73	Andy Jankowiak	KLAS Motorsports	Toyota	Dak's Market, Whelen
74	Mandy Chick	Team Chick Motorsports	Chevrolet	Dynamic Drivelines, JRCTax.com
97	Jason Kitzmiller	CR7 Motorsports	Chevrolet	A. L. L. Construction
Official entry list

== Pre-race practice ==
An optional pre-race practice session was held on Friday, May 5, at 9:00 AM CST, and would last for 5 hours. Jesse Love, driving for Venturini Motorsports, would set the fastest time in the session, with a lap of 31.387, and an average speed of 172.046 mph (276.881 km/h).

Pos.	#	Driver	Team	Make	Time	Speed
1	20	Jesse Love	Venturini Motorsports	Toyota	31.387	172.046
2	17	Taylor Gray	Tricon Garage	Toyota	31.592	170.929
3	18	Connor Mosack	Joe Gibbs Racing	Toyota	31.822	169.694
Full pre-race practice results

== Practice ==
The official practice session was held on Saturday, May 6, at 9:25 AM CST, and would last for 30 minutes. Jesse Love, driving for Venturini Motorsports, would set the fastest time in the session, with a lap of 30.912, and an average speed of 174.689 mph (281.135 km/h).

Pos.	#	Driver	Team	Make	Time	Speed
1	20	Jesse Love	Venturini Motorsports	Toyota	30.912	174.689
2	18	Connor Mosack	Joe Gibbs Racing	Toyota	31.006	174.160
3	25	Dean Thompson	Venturini Motorsports	Toyota	31.061	173.851
Full practice results

== Qualifying ==
Qualifying was held on Saturday, May 6, at 10:10 AM CST. The qualifying system used is a multi car, multi lap system with only one round. Whoever sets the fastest time in the round wins the pole. Jesse Love, driving for Venturini Motorsports, would score the pole for the race, with a lap of 30.785, and an average speed of 175.410 mph (282.295 km/h).

Pos.	#	Driver	Team	Make	Time	Speed
1	20	Jesse Love	Venturini Motorsports	Toyota	30.785	175.410
2	18	Connor Mosack	Joe Gibbs Racing	Toyota	31.096	173.656
3	25	Dean Thompson	Venturini Motorsports	Toyota	31.109	173.583
4	15	Amber Balcaen	Venturini Motorsports	Toyota	31.210	173.021
5	17	Taylor Gray	Tricon Garage	Toyota	31.253	172.783
6	30	Frankie Muniz (R)	Rette Jones Racing	Ford	31.329	172.364
7	32	Christian Rose (R)	AM Racing	Ford	31.391	172.024
8	55	Toni Breidinger	Venturini Motorsports	Toyota	31.432	171.799
9	6	Jack Wood	Rev Racing	Chevrolet	31.451	171.696
10	72	Cody Coughlin	Coughlin Brothers Racing	Ford	31.846	169.566
11	2	Andrés Pérez de Lara (R)	Rev Racing	Chevrolet	31.863	169.476
12	97	Jason Kitzmiller	CR7 Motorsports	Chevrolet	32.187	167.770
13	35	Greg Van Alst	Greg Van Alst Motorsports	Ford	32.281	167.281
14	45	Tony Cosentino	Tamayo Cosentino Racing	Chevrolet	32.454	166.389
15	74	Mandy Chick	Team Chick Motorsports	Chevrolet	32.589	165.700
16	69	Scott Melton	Kimmel Racing	Toyota	32.688	165.198
17	12	Gage Rodgers	Fast Track Racing	Chevrolet	32.877	164.249
18	66	Jon Garrett (R)	Veer Motorsports	Chevrolet	32.885	164.209
19	11	Josh Reaume	Fast Track Racing	Ford	33.019	163.542
20	8	Sean Corr	Empire Racing	Ford	33.127	163.009
21	7	Matt Wilson	CCM Racing	Toyota	33.773	159.891
22	10	Tim Monroe	Fast Track Racing	Ford	36.390	148.392
23	0	Kevin Hinckle	Wayne Peterson Racing	Toyota	36.458	148.116
24	03	Alex Clubb	Clubb Racing Inc.	Ford	37.004	145.930
25	06	A. J. Moyer	Wayne Peterson Racing	Ford	37.446	144.208
26	48	Brad Smith	Brad Smith Motorsports	Chevrolet	–	–
27	01	Zachary Tinkle	Fast Track Racing	Ford	–	–
Withdrew
28	73	Andy Jankowiak	KLAS Motorsports	Toyota	–	–
Official qualifying results

== Race results ==
Fin	St	#	Driver	Team	Make	Laps	Led	Status	Pts
1	1	20	Jesse Love	Venturini Motorsports	Toyota	100	96	Running	48
2	3	25	Dean Thompson	Venturini Motorsports	Toyota	100	1	Running	43
3	5	17	Taylor Gray	Tricon Garage	Toyota	100	3	Running	42
4	2	18	Connor Mosack	Joe Gibbs Racing	Toyota	100	0	Running	40
5	9	6	Jack Wood	Rev Racing	Chevrolet	100	0	Running	39
6	11	2	Andrés Pérez de Lara (R)	Rev Racing	Chevrolet	100	0	Running	38
7	10	72	Cody Coughlin	Coughlin Brothers Racing	Ford	100	0	Running	37
8	6	30	Frankie Muniz (R)	Rette Jones Racing	Ford	100	0	Running	36
9	7	32	Christian Rose (R)	AM Racing	Ford	100	0	Running	35
10	13	35	Greg Van Alst	Greg Van Alst Motorsports	Ford	100	0	Running	34
11	8	55	Toni Breidinger	Venturini Motorsports	Toyota	100	0	Running	33
12	15	74	Mandy Chick	Team Chick Motorsports	Chevrolet	100	0	Running	32
13	18	66	Jon Garrett (R)	Veer Motorsports	Chevrolet	99	0	Running	31
14	16	69	Scott Melton	Kimmel Racing	Toyota	99	0	Running	30
15	14	45	Tony Cosentino	Tamayo Cosentino Racing	Chevrolet	97	0	Running	29
16	20	8	Sean Corr	Empire Racing	Chevrolet	97	0	Running	28
17	21	7	Matt Wilson	CCM Racing	Toyota	94	0	Running	27
18	19	11	Josh Reaume	Fast Track Racing	Ford	92	0	Running	26
19	24	03	Alex Clubb	Clubb Racing Inc.	Ford	92	0	Running	25
20	25	06	A. J. Moyer	Wayne Peterson Racing	Ford	91	0	Running	24
21	23	0	Kevin Hinckle	Wayne Peterson Racing	Toyota	91	0	Running	23
22	4	15	Amber Balcaen	Venturini Motorsports	Toyota	71	0	Mechanical	22
23	12	97	Jason Kitzmiller	CR7 Motorsports	Chevrolet	64	0	Accident	21
24	26	48	Brad Smith	Brad Smith Motorsports	Chevrolet	27	0	Radio	20
25	17	12	Gage Rodgers	Fast Track Racing	Chevrolet	20	0	Electrical	19
26	22	10	Tim Monroe	Fast Track Racing	Ford	8	0	Axle	18
27	27	01	Zachary Tinkle	Fast Track Racing	Ford	3	0	Oil Pressure	17
Official race results

== Standings after the race ==
Drivers' Championship standings

	Pos	Driver	Points
1	1	Jesse Love	146
1	2	Frankie Muniz	142 (-4)
1	3	Jack Wood	130 (-16)
1	4	Greg Van Alst	127 (-19)
1	5	Andrés Pérez de Lara	122 (-24)
1	6	Tony Cosentino	120 (-26)
	7	Christian Rose	115 (-31)
	8	Sean Corr	108 (-38)
	9	Toni Breidinger	108 (-38)
4	10	Mandy Chick	91 (-55)

- Note: Only the first 10 positions are included for the driver standings.

Previous race: 2023 General Tire 200 (Talladega)	ARCA Menards Series; 2023 season	Next race: 2023 General Tire 150 (Charlotte)
