= Daniel Escoto =

Mexican racing driver

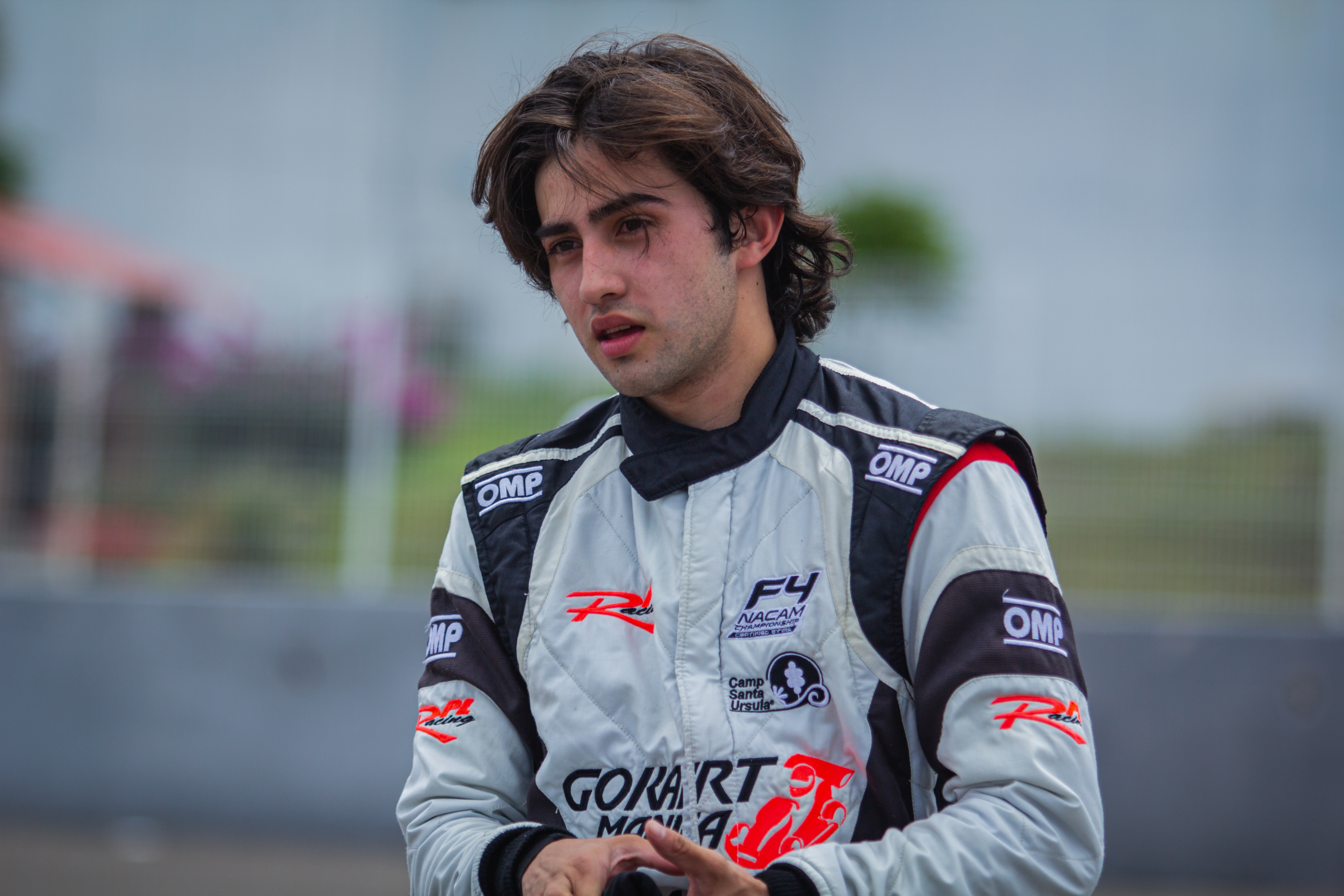
- Born: Leon, Mexico

ARCA Menards Series East career
- 2 races run over 1 year
- Best finish: 26th (2022)
- First race: 2022 Pensacola 200 (Pensacola)
- Last race: 2022 General Tire 125 (Dover)
Wins	Top tens	Poles
0	2	0
- Statistics up to date as of March 24, 2022.

Daniel Escoto is a Mexican professional stock car racing driver. He last competed part-time in the ARCA Menards Series East, driving the No. 60 Chevrolet SS for Josh Williams Motorsports in collaboration with Lira Motorsports.

== Racing career ==
=== ARCA Menards Series East ===
Escoto made his ARCA Menards Series East debut in 2022. Escoto was entered into the Race to Stop Suicide 200 at New Smyrna Speedway, but due to an illness, Logan Misuraca ran the race in his place. He debuted in the following race, the Pensacola 200 at Five Flags Speedway, finishing fourth, in order for his full-season, although he would depart from the team after the race at Dover Motor Speedway.

== Motorsports career results ==
=== ARCA Menards Series East ===
(key) (Bold – Pole position awarded by qualifying time. Italics – Pole position earned by points standings or practice time. * – Most laps led.)

ARCA Menards Series East results
Year	Team	No.	Make	1	2	3	4	5	6	7	AMSWC	Pts	Ref
2022	Josh Williams Motorsports with Lira Motorsports	60	Chevy	NSM	FIF; 4	DOV; 9	NSV	IOW	MLW	BRI	26th	75	
