= Benny Chastain =

American racing driver (1942–2025)

- Born: September 22, 1942; Tallahassee, Florida, U.S.
- Died: February 9, 2025 (aged 82)

ARCA Menards Series career
- 50 races run over 15 years
- Best finish: 23rd (2005), (2006)
- First race: 2004 ARCA Re/Max 200 (South Boston)
- Last race: 2022 Lucas Oil 200 (Daytona)
Wins	Top tens	Poles
0	0	0

Alva Bienville "Benny" Chastain Jr. (September 22, 1942 – February 9, 2025) was an American professional stock car racing driver. He competed part-time in the ARCA Menards Series from 2004 to 2022, with his final race being in the No. 01 Ford Fusion for Fast Track Racing. Chastain died on February 9, 2025, at the age of 82.

== Racing career ==
=== ARCA Menards Series ===
Chastain didn't start racing until 1997, when he was 55 years old. After years of success at his local dirt track, he made his ARCA Menards Series debut in 2004 at South Boston Speedway. Chastain finished 22nd in his series debut. Chastain made starts over the next twelve years, never running full-time outside of 2006. In 2017, Chastain managed to lead a lap at Talladega Superspeedway, the only one of his career. His best finish was fifteenth in 2020 at Daytona International Speedway.

=== ARCA Menards Series East ===
In 2022, Chastain attempted to make his first start in the ARCA Menards Series East at Five Flags Motor Speedway, driving the No. 10 for Fast Track Racing. He crashed in qualifying and failed to make the race, leading to Nate Moeller's No. 06 Wayne Peterson Racing car being renumbered.

== Motorsports career results ==
=== ARCA Menards Series ===
ARCA Menards Series results
Year	Team	No.	Make	1	2	3	4	5	6	7	8	9	10	11	12	13	14	15	16	17	18	19	20	21	22	23	AMSC	Pts	Ref
2004	Drew White Motorsports	75	Chevy	DAY	NSH	SLM	KEN	TOL	CLT	KAN	POC	MCH	SBO; 22	BLN													57th	510	
2004	Drew White Motorsports	24	Chevy												KEN; 34												57th	510	
2004	Wayne Peterson Racing	06	Chevy													GTW; 28											57th	510	
2004	Drew White Motorsports	06	Chevy														POC; 18	LER	NSH	ISF	TOL	DSF	CHI	SLM			57th	510	
2004	MK Racing	96	Chevy																						TAL; 26		57th	510	
2005	Drew White Motorsports	98	Pontiac	DAY; 41	NSH	SLM																					23rd	2070	
2005	Drew White Motorsports	93	Chevy				KEN; DNQ	TOL																			23rd	2070	
2005	Wayne Peterson Racing	06	Chevy						LAN; DNQ																		23rd	2070	
2005	Drew White Motorsports	98	Chevy							MIL; 36	POC; 25																23rd	2070	
2005	Drew White Motorsports	93	Chevy									MCH; DNQ															23rd	2070	
2005	Drew White Motorsports	98	Chevy										KAN; 36														23rd	2070	
2005	Drew White Motorsports	93	Chevy											KEN; DNQ	BLN; DNQ	POC; 25	GTW; 38	LER; DNQ	NSH; 27	MCH; DNQ	ISF; 31	TOL; DNQ	DSF; 21	CHI; 27	SLM; 26	TAL; DNQ	23rd	2070	
2006	Drew White Motorsports	93	Chevy	DAY; DNQ	NSH; DNQ	SLM; DNQ	WIN; DNQ	KEN; DNQ	TOL; DNQ	POC; 39	MCH; DNQ	KAN; 21	KEN; DNQ	BLN; 21	POC; 33	GTW; 37	NSH; 39	MCH; DNQ									23rd	2240	
2006	Lafferty Motorsports	89	Chevy																ISF; 28	MIL; DNQ	TOL; DNQ	DSF; 27	CHI; DNQ				23rd	2240	
2006	Lafferty Motorsports	39	Chevy																					SLM; DNQ			23rd	2240	
2006	Wayne Peterson Racing	0	Chevy																						TAL; DNQ		23rd	2240	
2006	Drew White Motorsports	93	Chevy																							IOW; DNQ	23rd	2240	
2007	Bob Schacht Motorsports	24	Ford	DAY; 38	USA	NSH	SLM	KAN	WIN	KEN	TOL	IOW	POC	MCH	BLN	KEN	POC	NSH	ISF	MIL	GTW	DSF	CHI	SLM			172nd	65	
2007	Bob Schacht Motorsports	75	Ford																						TAL; DNQ	TOL	172nd	65	
2008	Bob Schacht Motorsports	54	Chevy	DAY; 27	SLM	IOW	KAN	CAR	KEN	TOL	POC	MCH	CAY	KEN	BLN	POC	NSH	ISF	DSF	CHI	SLM	NJE	TAL	TOL			132nd	95	
2009	Bob Schacht Motorsports	42	Chevy	DAY; 42	SLM	CAR	TAL	KEN	TOL	POC	MCH	MFD	IOW	KEN	BLN	POC	ISF	CHI	TOL	DSF	NJE	SLM	KAN	CAR			132nd	95	
2010	Bob Schacht Motorsports	75	Toyota	DAY	PBE	SLM	TEX	TAL; 34	TOL	POC	MCH	IOW	MFD														57th	405	
2010	Bob Schacht Motorsports	75	Ford											POC; 30	BLN	NJE	ISF	CHI; 38	DSF	TOL	SLM	KAN; 22	CAR; 25				57th	405	
2011	Bob Schacht Motorsports	75	Toyota	DAY; 35																							29th	775	
2011	Bob Schacht Motorsports	75	Chevy		TAL; 27	SLM	TOL	NJE																			29th	775	
2011	Bob Schacht Motorsports	75	Ford						CHI; 16	POC; 24	MCH; 25	WIN	BLN	IOW													29th	775	
2011	Bob Schacht Motorsports	75	Chevy												IRP; 33	POC; 41	ISF	MAD	DSF	SLM	KAN; 18	TOL; 31					29th	775	
2013	Bob Schacht Motorsports	75	Chevy	DAY; 19	MOB	SLM	TAL; 19	TOL	ELK	POC	MCH	ROA	WIN	CHI	NJE	POC	BLN	ISF	MAD	DSF	IOW	SLM	KEN	KAN			84th	270	
2014	Bob Schacht Motorsports	75	Chevy	DAY	MOB	SLM	TAL; 28	TOL	NJE	POC	MCH	ELK	WIN	CHI	IRP	POC	BLN	ISF	MAD	DSF	SLM	KEN	KAN				137th	90	
2016	Bob Schacht Motorsports	5	Chevy	DAY	NSH	SLM	TAL	TOL	NJE; 17	POC	MCH	MAD	WIN	IOW	IRP	POC	BLN	ISF	DSF	SLM	CHI	KEN	KAN				115th	145	
2017	Bob Schacht Motorsports	75	Chevy	DAY	NSH	SLM	TAL; 26	TOL	ELK	POC	MCH	MAD	IOW	IRP	POC	WIN	ISF	ROA	DSF	SLM	CHI	KEN	KAN				112th	105	
2020	Our Motorsports	09	Chevy	DAY; 15	PHO	TAL	POC	IRP	KEN	IOW	KAN	TOL	TOL	MCH	DAY	GTW	L44	TOL	BRI	WIN	MEM	ISF	KAN				72nd	29	
2021	Cram Racing Enterprises	94	Toyota	DAY; 20	PHO	TAL; 21	KAN	TOL	CLT	MOH	POC	ELK	BLN	IOW	WIN	GLN	MCH	ISF	MLW	DSF	BRI	SLM	KAN				70th	47	
2022	Fast Track Racing	01	Ford	DAY; 25	PHO	TAL	KAN	CLT	IOW	BLN	ELK	MOH	POC	IRP	MCH	GLN	ISF	MLW	DSF	KAN	BRI	SLM	TOL				113th	19	

==== ARCA Menards Series East ====
ARCA Menards Series East results
Year	Team	No.	Make	1	2	3	4	5	6	7	AMSEC	Pts	Ref
2022	Fast Track Racing	10	Toyota	NSM	FIF; Wth	DOV	NSV	IOW	MLW	BRI	N/A	0	
