= Stephanie Moyer =

American professional stock car racing driver

- Born: September 24, 1997 (age 29); Sheppton, Pennsylvania, U.S.

ARCA Menards Series career
- 5 races run over 2 years
- Best finish: 40th (2021)
- First race: 2021 General Tire #AnywhereIsPossible 200 (Pocono)
- Last race: 2022 Calypso Lemonade 150 (Iowa)
Wins	Top tens	Poles
0	0	0

ARCA Menards Series East career
- 11 races run over 2 years
- Best finish: 4th (2022)
- First race: 2021 Pensacola 200 (Pensacola)
- Last race: 2026 Cook Out Music City 150 (Nashville Fairgrounds)
Wins	Top tens	Poles
0	3	0
- Statistics up to date as of December 3, 2021.

Stephanie Moyer (born September 24, 1997) is an American professional stock car racing driver. She last competed in the ARCA Menards Series East and the ARCA Menards Series, driving the No. 01 for Fast Track Racing.

== Racing career ==
=== Early years ===
Moyer would first race in Champ Cars at the age of twelve. In 2012, she would move up to the Factory Stock division at Evergreen Raceway, and raced there for nine years before eventually winning the championship in 2020.

=== ARCA Menards Series ===
Moyer would make her first start in the ARCA Menards Series at the 2021 General Tire #AnywhereIsPossible 200, finishing fifteenth. She would make three more starts in series combination events, retiring from two events and finishing twentieth in Milwaukee.

=== ARCA Menards Series East ===
Moyer would get her first chance at ARCA, after her fiance's boss, Johnny Davis, recommended Moyer to Fast Track Racing owner Andy Hillenburg. Moyer would make her debut with Fast Track Racing at the 2021 Pensacola 200, finishing a respectable eighth, earning her first top-ten. Afterwards, she would get another top-ten at the 2021 Crosley Record Pressing 200, but, the season would take a downturn for her afterwards, retiring for the rest of the races (with the exception of the 2021 Sprecher 150), finishing last once at Iowa.

On December 22, 2021, it was announced that she would run the full season in the No. 01 for Fast Track Racing in 2022 after driving the majority of the 2021 season for the team.

=== Modifieds ===
Moyer would make her debut in asphalt modifieds at Mahoning Valley Speedway on July 31, 2021 at the 2021 Morin Arthofer Sr. Tribute.

== Personal life ==
Moyer had a brother, Michael, who died in 2011 in a car accident. She is a second-generation racer, following in her father's and uncle's footsteps. She is not related to Floridian ARCA driver A. J. Moyer.

== Motorsports career results ==
=== ARCA Menards Series ===
(key) (Bold – Pole position awarded by qualifying time. Italics – Pole position earned by points standings or practice time. * – Most laps led.)

ARCA Menards Series results
Year	Team	No.	Make	1	2	3	4	5	6	7	8	9	10	11	12	13	14	15	16	17	18	19	20	AMSC	Pts	Ref
2021	Fast Track Racing	01	Toyota	DAY	PHO	TAL	KAN	TOL	CLT	MOH	POC; 15	ELK	BLN	IOW; 23	WIN	GLN	MCH	ISF						40th	91	
2021	Fast Track Racing	12	Toyota																MLW; 20	DSF				40th	91	
2021	Fast Track Racing	44	Toyota																		BRI; 27	SLM	KAN	40th	91	
2022	Fast Track Racing	01	Toyota	DAY	PHO	TAL	KAN	CLT	IOW; 21	BLN	ELK	MOH	POC; 19	IRP	MCH	GLN	ISF	MLW; 24	DSF	KAN	BRI; 21	SLM	TOL	41st	91	
2023	Fast Track Racing	11	Toyota	DAY	PHO	TAL	KAN	CLT; 17	BLN	ELK	MOH	IOW	POC; 14	MCH	IRP	GLN	ISF	MLW	DSF	KAN	BRI	SLM		42nd	91	
2023	Fast Track Racing	12	Toyota																				TOL; 10	42nd	91	

=== ARCA Menards Series East ===
ARCA Menards Series East results
Year	Team	No.	Make	1	2	3	4	5	6	7	8	AMSEC	Pts	Ref
2021	Fast Track Racing	12	Toyota	NSM	FIF; 8	NSV; 10	DOV	SNM; 13		MLW; 20		10th	213	
2021	Fast Track Racing	01	Toyota						IOW; 23			10th	213	
2021	Fast Track Racing	44	Toyota								BRI; 27	10th	213	
2022	Fast Track Racing	01	Toyota	NSM; 9	FIF; 12	DOV; 12	NSV; 11	IOW; 21	MLW; 24	BRI; 21		4th	298	
2023	Fast Track Racing	12	Chevy	FIF	DOV	NSV; 13	FRS	IOW	IRP	MLW	BRI	45th	31	
