= Logan Misuraca =

American racing driver (born 1999)

- Born: June 5, 1999 (age 27); Sanford, Florida, U.S.

ARCA Menards Series career
- 6 races run over 4 years
- Best finish: 61st (2023)
- First race: 2023 BRANDT 200 (Daytona)
- Last race: 2026 Alabama Manufactured Housing 200 (Talladega)
Wins	Top tens	Poles
0	0	0

ARCA Menards Series East career
- 3 races run over 3 years
- Best finish: 42nd (2022)
- First race: 2022 Race to Stop Suicide 200 (New Smyrna)
- Last race: 2025 Bush's Beans 200 (Bristol)
Wins	Top tens	Poles
0	1	0
- Statistics up to date as of April 25, 2026.

Logan Misuraca (born June 5, 1999) is an American professional stock car racing driver. She last competed part-time in the ARCA Menards Series, driving the No. 34/86 Ford for City Garage Motorsports.

== Racing career ==
=== Early career ===
Misuraca started her racing career at age four, driving Quarter Midgets, before quickly moving up to Go-Karts. She later put her driving on hold to become a crew chief to learn the basics of alterations, benefits, and marketing strategies with her father, Dennis Misuraca. She later was skilled in working on a 360 winged Sprint Car.

After taking some time off from racing in order to focus on dancing in high school, Misuraca drove an asphalt legend car for about 2 years. In 2020, she joined ARCA Menards Series team Lira Motorsports and Race Car Solutions, where she had the opportunity to test and race in the NASCAR Whelen All-American Series in her home state of Florida.

=== ARCA ===
On November 13, 2020, Lira Motorsports announced they would return to the NASCAR Camping World Truck Series, ARCA Menards Series and ARCA Menards Series East for the 2021 season with Misuraca driving part-time in each series for the team with her first start being at the East Series season-opener at New Smyrna Speedway. In preparation for the season, Misuraca and Lira Motorsports entered ARCA's preseason test session at Daytona International Speedway in January. Misuraca was initially on the entry list in a No. 33 car for Lira, but the car was later withdrawn from the test session. She and the team were then not entered at New Smyrna as had been planned, leading to speculation that her deal with Lira had fallen through. Misuraca confirmed this in an interview in April of that year. Soon after, she joined On Point Motorsports to potentially drive their No. 30 at some point in the season with series title sponsor Camping World sponsoring the truck. Camping World CEO Marcus Lemonis made efforts during the season to get all trucks in each race sponsored as Camping World would sponsor any truck in a race that did not have a sponsor. She filmed a video at the Camping World store in Concord, North Carolina to try to get the attention of Camping World and Lemonis and get them to sponsor her. Ultimately, this was unsuccessful as no deal was put together and Misuraca would not make any NASCAR and ARCA starts in 2021.

On February 15, 2022, Misuraca would make her ARCA Menards Series East debut in the season-opener at New Smyrna in the No. 60 car for Josh Williams Motorsports as a last minute replacement for Daniel Escoto, who got sick days before the race. The entry was fielded in a collaboration with Lira Motorsports, the team who she had been scheduled to drive for in the same race in 2021. She would finish seventh in that race.

On October 21, 2022, Misuraca announced that she would run part-time in the main ARCA Series in 2023 starting at the season-opener at Daytona with hopes to run a full season with sponsorship from 1inamillion.life, a company she founded. On November 1, she revealed to Forbes that she would be driving for Ben Kennedy Racing in a No. 1 car. However, on January 16, 2023, it was announced that she would instead drive the No. 63 car for Spraker Racing Enterprises at Daytona and Talladega with sponsorship from Celsius Energy Drink. The part-time car was previously driven by Dave Mader III for the previous five years.

On September 17, 2024, it was revealed that Misuraca would run the ARCA Menards Series/East Series combination race at Bristol Motor Speedway, driving the No. 9 Chevrolet for Rev Racing with sponsorship from Clean Harbors.

On December 8, 2025, it was revealed that Misuraca will run the ARCA Menards Series season-opener at Daytona, driving the No. 85 Ford for City Garage Motorsports with sponsorship from Orlando Health.

== Personal life ==
When Misuraca was only eighteenth months old, she began her career in dancing. She grew up dancing and competing in dance competitions, winning multiple titles and awards. She was a member of the Lake Mary Marionettes, a National Championship Dance Team, in high school. After she graduated high school, she began working as a dance instructor, and choreographing for her local area.

In preparation for the 2023 ARCA Menards season, Misuraca created 1inaMillion.life to benefit mental health awareness. Her 2023 paint scheme will include pictures of fans who purchase "blocks" for $1 with a portion of proceeds benefiting mental health charities.

Outside of racing, Misuraca is also a driving instructor at Daytona International Speedway for the NASCAR Fan Experience. She currently attends the University of Central Florida, studying in aerospace engineering.

== Motorsports career results ==
=== ARCA Menards Series ===
(key) (Bold – Pole position awarded by qualifying time. Italics – Pole position earned by points standings or practice time. * – Most laps led. ** – All laps led.)

ARCA Menards Series results
Year	Team	No.	Make	1	2	3	4	5	6	7	8	9	10	11	12	13	14	15	16	17	18	19	20	AMSC	Pts	Ref
2023	Spraker Racing Enterprises	63	Chevy	DAY; 18	PHO	TAL; 28	KAN	CLT	BLN	ELK	MOH	IOW	POC; 25	MCH	IRP	GLN	ISF	MLW	DSF	KAN	BRI	SLM	TOL	61st	67	
2024	Rev Racing	9	Chevy	DAY	PHO	TAL	DOV	KAN	CLT	IOW	MOH	BLN	IRP	SLM	ELK	MCH	ISF	MLW	DSF	GLN	BRI; 27	KAN	TOL	108th	17	
2025	Rev Racing	9	Chevy	DAY	PHO	TAL	KAN	CLT	MCH	BLN	ELK	LRP	DOV	IRP	IOW	GLN	ISF	MAD	DSF	BRI; 25	SLM	KAN	TOL	133rd	19	
2026	City Garage Motorsports	86	Ford	DAY; DNQ	PHO	KAN																		104th	30	
2026	City Garage Motorsports	34	Ford				TAL; 17	GLN	TOL	MCH	POC	BER	ELK	CHI	LRP	IRP	IOW	ISF	MAD	DSF	SLM	BRI	KAN	104th	30	

^{*} Season still in progress

==== ARCA Menards Series East ====
ARCA Menards Series East results
Year	Team	No.	Make	1	2	3	4	5	6	7	8	AMSEC	Pts	Ref
2022	Josh Williams Motorsports with Lira Motorsports	60	Chevy	NSM; 7	FIF	DOV	NSV	IOW	MLW	BRI		42nd	37	
2024	Rev Racing	9	Chevy	FIF	DOV	NSV	FRS	IOW	IRP	MLW	BRI; 27	59th	17	
2025	Rev Racing	9	Chevy	FIF	CAR	NSV	FRS	DOV	IRP	IOW	BRI; 25	70th	19	
