= Steve Austin (racing driver) =

American Nascar driver

- Born: New Bern, North Carolina

ARCA Menards Series East career
- 2 races run over 1 year
- Best finish: 28th (2022)
- First race: 2022 Race to Stop Suicide 200 (New Smyrna)
- Last race: 2022 Pensacola 200 (Pensacola)
Wins	Top tens	Poles
0	2	0
- Statistics up to date as of March 5, 2022.

Steve Austin, is an American professional stock car racing driver. He last competed part-time in the ARCA Menards Series East, driving the No. 22 Chevrolet SS for CCM Racing.

== Racing career ==
=== ARCA Menards Series East ===
Austin made his ARCA Menards Series East debut in 2022 at New Smyrna Speedway. He failed to finish, coming home twelfth. It was announced on 8 May 2022, that Austin would drive full-time in the 2023 ARCA Menards Series East for a new team, Tom Crosby Enterprises.

== Motorsports career results ==
=== ARCA Menards Series East ===
ARCA Menards Series East results
Year	Team	No.	Make	1	2	3	4	5	6	7	AMSWC	Pts	Ref
2022	CCM Racing	22	Chevy	NSM; 12	FIF; 11	DOV	NSV	IOW	MLW	BRI	28th	65	
