= 2022 Music City 200 =

Race details
- Race 4 of 7 in the 2022 ARCA Menards Series East season
- Date: May 7, 2022
- Location: Nashville Fairgrounds Speedway in Nashville, Tennessee
- Course: Permanent racing facility
- Course length: 0.959 km (0.596 miles)
- Distance: 200 laps, 119.20 mi (198.83 km)
- Average speed: 78.421

Pole position
Driver	Jake Finch	Phoenix Racing
- Time: 19.529

Most laps led
Driver	Sammy Smith	Kyle Busch Motorsports
- Laps: 156

Winner
No. 18	Sammy Smith	Kyle Busch Motorsports

The 2022 Music City 200 was an ARCA Menards Series East race that was held on May 7, 2022, at the Nashville Fairgrounds Speedway in Nashville, Tennessee. It was contested over 200 laps on the 0.596-mile (0.959 km) short track. It was the fourth race of the 2022 ARCA Menards Series East season. Kyle Busch Motorsports driver Sammy Smith collected the victory, his third of the season. Jake Finch and Taylor Gray finished 2nd and third respectively.

== Background ==
=== Entry list ===
- (R) denotes rookie driver.
- (i) denotes a driver who is ineligible for series driver points.

No.	Driver	Team	Manufacturer	Sponsor
01	Stephanie Moyer	Fast Track Racing	Toyota	EvergreenRacewayPark.com
1	Jake Finch	Phoenix Racing	Toyota	Phoenix Construction
02	Leland Honeyman	Young's Motorsports	Chevrolet	LH Waterfront Construction
06	Nate Moeller	Wayne Peterson Racing	Ford	GreatRailing.com
10	Matt Wilson	Fast Track Racing	Toyota	R.A. Wilson Enterprises, Coble Enterprises
11	Ryan Roulette	Fast Track Racing	Ford	Bellator-AnserAdvisory
12	Tony Cosentino	Fast Track Racing	Chevrolet	Fast Track High Performance Driving
17	Taylor Gray	David Gilliland Racing	Ford	Ford Performance
18	Sammy Smith	Joe Gibbs Racing	Toyota	TMC Transportation
42	Christian Rose	Cook Racing Technologies	Toyota	Visit West Virginia
44	Mason Mingus	Ferrier-McClure Racing	Ford	Team Construction
48	Brad Smith	Brad Smith Motorsports	Chevrolet	PSST... Copraya Websites
60	Michael Lira	Josh Williams Motorsports with Lira Motorsports	Ford	Girem Tile Work
74	Donald Theetge	Visconti Motorsports	Toyota	Groupe Theetge, XPN World
95	Tanner Arms	MAN Motorsports	Toyota	Cedar City RV-Compass RV-Scenic Roads RV
Official entry list

== Practice/Qualifying ==
=== Starting Lineups ===
Pos	No	Driver	Team	Manufacturer	Time
1	1	Jake Finch	Phoenix Racing	Chevrolet	19.529
2	18	Sammy Smith	Kyle Busch Motorsports	Toyota	19.566
3	02	Leland Honeyman	Young's Motorsports	Chevrolet	19.659
4	17	Taylor Gray	David Gilliland Racing	Ford	19.784
5	60	Michael Lira	Josh Williams Motorsports with Lira Motorsports	Chevrolet	19.988
6	44	Mason Mingus	Ferrier-McClure Racing	Ford	20.079
7	42	Christian Rose	Cook Racing Technologies	Toyota	20.095
8	74	Donald Theetge	Visconti Motorsports	Toyota	20.534
9	10	Matt Wilson	Fast Track Racing	Toyota	20.577
10	95	Tanner Arms	MAN Motorsports	Toyota	20.706
11	1	Stephanie Moyer	Fast Track Racing	Toyota	20.99
12	12	Tony Cosentino	Fast Track Racing	Chevrolet	22.246
13	48	Brad Smith	Brad Smith Motorsports	Chevrolet	22.463
14	11	Ryan Roulette	Fast Track Racing	Ford	22.56
15	06	Nate Moeller	Wayne Peterson Racing	Ford	24.894
Official practice/qualifying results

== Race ==
=== Race results ===
Pos	Grid	No	Driver	Team	Manufacturer	Laps	Points	Status
1	2	18	Sammy Smith	Kyle Busch Motorsports	Toyota	200	48	Running
2	1	1	Jake Finch	Phoenix Racing	Chevrolet	200	44	Toyota
3	4	17	Taylor Gray	David Gilliland Racing	Ford	200	41	Running
4	6	44	Mason Mingus	Ferrier-McClure Racing	Ford	200	40	Running
5	3	02	Leland Honeyman	Young's Motorsports	Chevrolet	200	39	Running
6	10	95	Tanner Arms	MAN Motorsports	Toyota	197	38	Running
7	5	60	Michael Lira	Josh Williams Motorsports with Lira Motorsports	Chevrolet	195	37	Running
8	8	74	Donald Theetge	Visconti Motorsports	Toyota	195	36	Running
9	9	10	Matt Wilson	Fast Track Racing	Toyota	189	35	Running
10	14	11	Ryan Roulette	Fast Track Racing	Ford	182	34	Running
11	11	01	Stephanie Moyer	Fast Track Racing	Toyota	93	33	Transmission
12	7	42	Christian Rose	Cook Racing Technologies	Toyota	90	32	Transmission
13	13	48	Brad Smith	Brad Smith Motorsports	Chevrolet	27	31	Handling
14	12	12	Tony Cosentino	Fast Track Racing	Chevrolet	22	30	Brakes

Previous race: 2022 General Tire 125	ARCA Menards Series East; 2022 season	Next race: 2022 Calypso Lemonade 150
