= 2022 Pensacola 200 =

Race details
- Race 2 of 7 in the 2022 ARCA Menards Series East season
- Date: March 19, 2022
- Location: Five Flags Speedway in Pensacola, Florida
- Course: Permanent racing facility
- Course length: 0.80 km (0.50 miles)
- Distance: 200 laps, 100.00 mi (160.93 km)
- Average speed: 59.347

Pole position
Driver	Leland Honeyman	Young's Motorsports
- Time: 17.222

Most laps led
Driver	Sammy Smith	Kyle Busch Motorsports
- Laps: 107

Winner
No. 18	Sammy Smith	Kyle Busch Motorsports

The 2022 Pensacola 200 was an ARCA Menards Series East race that was held on March 19, 2022, at Five Flags Speedway in Pensacola, Florida. It was contested over 200 laps on the 0.50-mile (0.80 km) short track. It was the second race of the 2022 ARCA Menards Series East season. Kyle Busch Motorsports driver Sammy Smith collected his second victory of the season.

== Background ==
=== Entry list ===
- (R) denotes rookie driver.
- (i) denotes driver who is ineligible for series driver points.

No.	Driver	Team	Manufacturer	Sponsor
01	Stephanie Moyer	Fast Track Racing	Toyota	EvergreenRacewayPark.com
1	Jake Finch	Phoenix Racing	Toyota	Phoenix Construction
02	Leland Honeyman	Young's Motorsports	Chevrolet	LH Waterfront Construction
06	Nate Moeller	Wayne Peterson Racing	Ford	GreatRailing.com
10	Benny Chastain	Fast Track Racing	Toyota	Fast Track Racing
11	Willie Mullins	Fast Track Racing	Toyota	Crow Wing Recycling
12	Tim Monroe	Fast Track Racing	Chevrolet	Fast Track High Performance Driving
17	Taylor Gray	David Gilliland Racing	Ford	Ford Performance
18	Sammy Smith	Joe Gibbs Racing	Toyota	TMC Transportation
22	Steve Austin	CCM Racing	Chevrolet	Red Tide Canopies, Coble Enterprises
42	Christian Rose	Cook Racing Technologies	Toyota	Visit West Virginia
44	Brandon Varney	Ferrier-McClure Racing	Ford	Vans Tire Center, Drive Train Specialists DT
48	Brad Smith	Brad Smith Motorsports	Chevrolet	PSST... Copraya Websites
49	Ashton Higgins	ALH Motorsports	Toyota	Leapfrog Landscaping
60	Daniel Escoto	Josh Williams Motorsports with Lira Motorsports	Chevrolet	Girem Tile Work
74	Donald Theetge	Visconti Motorsports	Toyota	Groupe Theetge, Bomber Eyewear, Lucas Oil
Official entry list

== Practice ==
Pos	No.	Driver	Team	Manufacturer	Time	Speed
1	17	Taylor Gray	David Gilliland Racing	Ford	17.456	103.116
2	18	Sammy Smith	Kyle Busch Motorsports	Toyota	17.557	102.523
3	02	Leland Honeyman	Young's Motorsports	Chevrolet	17.81	101.067
Official practice results

== Qualifying ==
=== Starting Lineups ===
Pos	No	Driver	Team	Manufacturer	Time
1	02	Leland Honeyman	Young's Motorsports	Chevrolet	17.222
2	17	Taylor Gray	David Gilliland Racing	Ford	17.356
3	1	Jake Finch	Phoenix Racing	Chevrolet	17.374
4	18	Sammy Smith	Joe Gibbs Racing	Toyota	17.411
5	49	Ashton Higgins	ALH Motorsports	Toyota	17.491
6	42	Christian Rose	Cook Racing Technologies	Toyota	17.806
7	44	Brandon Varney	Ferrier-McClure Racing	Ford	17.974
8	11	Willie Mullins	Fast Track Racing	Toyota	18.151
9	60	Daniel Escoto	Josh Williams Motorsports with Lira Motorsports	Chevrolet	18.154
10	74	Donald Theetge	Visconti Motorsports	Toyota	18.178
11	01	Stephanie Moyer	Fast Track Racing	Toyota	19.227
12	48	Brad Smith	Brad Smith Motorsports	Chevrolet	19.496
13	22	Steve Austin	CCM Racing	Chevrolet	19.676
14	12	Tim Monroe	Fast Track Racing	Chevrolet	20.122
15	10	Nate Moeller	Wayne Peterson Racing/Fast Track Racing	Ford	—
Withdrew
WD	06	Nate Moeller	Wayne Peterson Racing	Ford	—
WD	10	Benny Chastain	Fast Track Racing	Toyota	21.182
Official qualifying results

- Nate Moeller did qualify his No. 06 Wayne Peterson Racing Ford but drove his car renumbered with the No. 10 in the race since Benny Chastain crashed his No. 10 Toyota car of Fast Track Racing during qualifying but still made the race. Since Fast Track didn't have a backup car, Chastain withdrew from the race and let Moeller drive his (previously No. 06) car in the race.

== Race ==
=== Race results ===
Pos	Grid	No	Driver	Team	Manufacturer	Laps	Points	Status
1	4	18	Sammy Smith	Kyle Busch Motorsports	Toyota	200	48	Running
2	1	02	Leland Honeyman	Young's Motorsports	Chevrolet	200	44	Running
3	2	17	Taylor Gray	David Gilliland Racing	Ford	200	42	Running
4	9	60	Daniel Escoto	Josh Williams Motorsports with Lira Motorsports	Chevrolet	200	40	Running
5	8	11	Willie Mullins	Fast Track Racing	Toyota	200	39	Running
6	7	44	Brandon Varney	Ferrier-McClure Racing	Ford	200	38	Running
7	5	49	Ashton Higgins	ALH Motorsports	Toyota	199	37	Running
8	3	1	Jake Finch	Phoenix Racing	Chevrolet	193	36	Flat tire
9	10	74	Donald Theetge	Visconti Motorsports	Toyota	185	35	Running
10	6	42	Christian Rose	Cook Racing Technologies	Toyota	151	34	Running
11	13	22	Steve Austin	CCM Racing	Chevrolet	92	33	Crash
12	11	01	Stephanie Moyer	Fast Track Racing	Toyota	60	32	Transmission
13	14	12	Tim Monroe	Fast Track Racing	Chevrolet	46	31	Handling
14	12	48	Brad Smith	Brad Smith Motorsports	Chevrolet	24	30	Brakes
15	15	10	Nate Moeller	Wayne Peterson Racing/Fast Track Racing	Ford	2	29	Clutch
Official race results

Previous race: 2022 Race to Stop Suicide 200	ARCA Menards Series East; 2022 season	Next race: 2022 General Tire 125
