= Josh Williams Motorsports =

NASCAR and ARCA team

- Owner(s): Theresa Williams; Josh Williams; Kevin Williams; Mario Gosselin (former)
- Base: Concord, North Carolina
- Series: ARCA Menards Series, ARCA Menards Series East
- Race drivers: ARCA Menards Series: 60. Michael Lira; ARCA Menards Series East: 60. Logan Misuraca, Daniel Escoto, Michael Lira
- Manufacturer: Chevrolet; Ford
- Opened: 2010 (ARCA); 2014 (Truck)

Career
- Debut: ARCA Menards Series: 2010 Tire Kingdom 150 (Palm Beach); NASCAR Camping World Truck Series: 2014 Kroger 250 (Martinsville)
- Race victories: 2

Josh Williams Motorsports (also sometimes known as Josh Williams Racing and formerly known as Williams-Gosselin Racing) is a team owned by driver Josh Williams that competes part-time in the ARCA Menards Series, fielding the No. 60 Chevrolet of Brad Perez. The team also competed in one NASCAR Truck Series race in 2014 at the spring Martinsville race with Williams driving the No. 66 Ford.

== History ==
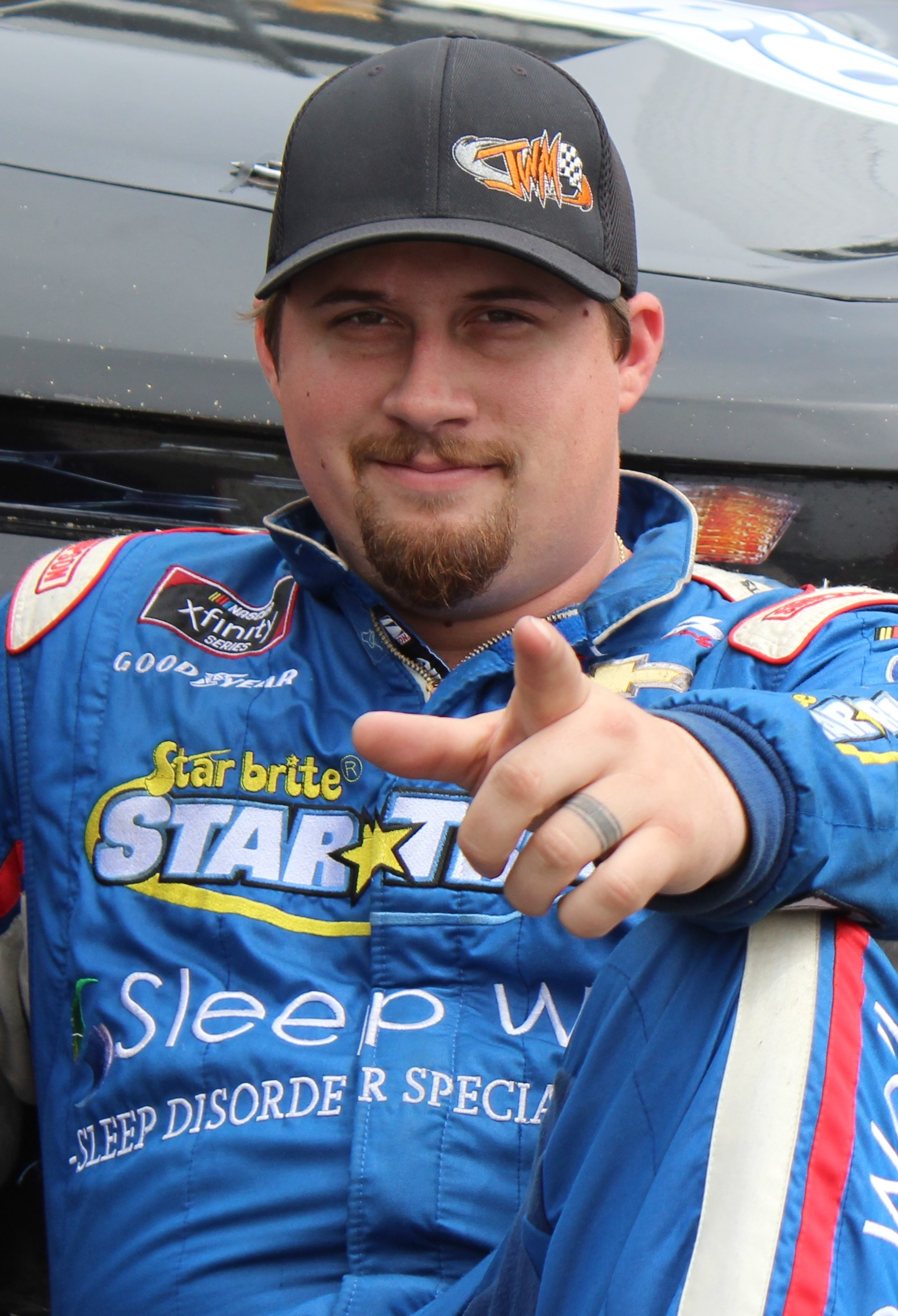
Team owner / driver Josh Williams

The team, under the name Josh Williams Racing, debuted in 2010 in the ARCA Racing Series in the series' first and only race to date at Palm Beach International Raceway. Josh Williams piloted the No. 02 Ford, starting 11th and finishing 20th in what was also his debut in the series.

In 2015, Josh Williams Motorsports ran their first full season in the ARCA Series, with Williams driving the car in all races except for Chicago, where Cunningham Motorsports asked him to drive their No. 22 car in that race. Williams accepted the offer and as a result, Tyler Audie drove the No. 6 in a partnership between his own family team and JWM. It was a successful year for the team, as they picked up six top-five finishes and fourteen top-tens, and also sponsorship from Musselman's Applesauce for select races.

After the team and Williams ran their first full seasons in ARCA in 2015, for 2016, they were able to hire a full-time crew chief for the first time, Daniel Johnson. According to Williams, himself and two other crew members were the only permanent employees of the team. Williams himself again was set to compete in all races that season, but this changed when Williams stepped out of the driver's seat for Michael Lira to drive at DuQuoin. Instead, Williams was the crew chief for Lira in the race (instead of Johnson). Williams and the team won their first two races that year at the Nashville Fairgrounds Speedway and at Madison International Speedway.

In 2017, Williams did not return full-time and moved to the Xfinity Series to run part-time for former team partner Mario Gosselin's team, King Autosport, in the No. 90 car. Lira returned to the No. 6 for Daytona and Nashville in a partnership with his father Carlos' team and Williams'. JWM did not attempt any other races that year until the Salem race in September. However, the team used the No. 31 instead of their usual No. 6. The reason for the number switch was because it was throwback weekend, and their paint scheme honored Bob Fields, who used the No. 31.

Williams announced sometime in late 2019 that he would be fielding a car at the 2020 ARCA season-opener at Daytona. The car was later confirmed to be a Ford and have the No. 60. On January 3, 2020, Ryan Vargas announced that he would be driving the car at the series' testing at Daytona the following weekend. Along with Vargas, Doug Herd and Josh White drove the No. 60 in the test session. Williams then revealed on January 19, 2020, that his team would be running a part-time schedule in 2020 in ARCA with various drivers and sponsors to be determined. Their Daytona efforts would fall through and the team ended up not attempting any races that year.

The team returned for the 2021 season by entering ARCA's preseason Daytona test session for the second straight year, where they partnered with Lira Motorsports again and fielded Lira's drivers, Andrik Dimayuga and Juan Manuel González, in the No. 60 car. On July 30, 2021, it was announced that Brad Perez would be making his ARCA Menards Series debut with the team in the No. 60 Chevrolet.

In 2022, Michael Lira returned to the series in the Lucas Oil 200. Daniel Escoto was intended for the full-season, but in the first race due to illness he was replaced by Logan Misuraca in her first start.
