= 2022 General Tire 125 =

Third race of the 2022 ARCA Menards Series

Race details
- Race 3 of 7 of the 2022 ARCA Menards Series East
- Date: April 29, 2022
- Official name: 22nd Annual General Tire 125
- Location: Dover, Delaware, Dover Motor Speedway
- Course: Permanent racing facility
- Course length: 1 miles (1.61 km)
- Distance: 125 laps, 125 mi (201.168 km)
- Scheduled distance: 125 laps, 125 mi (201.168 km)
- Average speed: 119.048 mph (191.589 km/h)

Pole position
Driver	Taylor Gray	David Gilliland Racing
- Time: 22.372

Most laps led
Driver	Taylor Gray	David Gilliland Racing
- Laps: 116

Winner
No. 17	Taylor Gray	David Gilliland Racing

Television in the United States
- Network: USA Network
- Announcers: Charlie Krall, Adam Mackey

Radio in the United States
- Radio: ARCA

The 2022 General Tire 125 was the third stock car race of the 2022 ARCA Menards Series East season, and the 22nd iteration of the event. The race was held on Friday, April 29, 2022, in Dover, Delaware at Dover Motor Speedway, a 1 mile (1.6 km) permanent oval-shaped racetrack. The race was contested over 125 laps. At race's end, Taylor Gray of David Gilliland Racing would win, after starting from the pole and leading the most laps. This was Gray's first career east series win, and his first of the season. To fill out the podium, Jesse Love and Conner Jones of Venturini Motorsports would finish 2nd and 3rd, respectively.

The race is scheduled to be the debut of the Ford Mustang body design, which will be used by David Gilliland Racing. The manufacturer will fully replace the Ford Fusion starting in 2023.

== Background ==
Dover Motor Speedway (formerly Dover Downs International Speedway and later Dover International Speedway) is a race track in Dover, Delaware, United States. The track has hosted at least one NASCAR Cup Series race each year since 1969, including two per year from 1971 to 2020. In addition to NASCAR, the track also hosted USAC and the Indy Racing League. The track features one layout, a 1 mile (1.6 km) concrete oval, with 24° banking in the turns and 9° banking on the straights. The speedway is owned and operated by Speedway Motorsports.

The track, nicknamed "The Monster Mile", was built in 1969 by Melvin Joseph of Melvin L. Joseph Construction Company, Inc., with an asphalt surface, but was replaced with concrete in 1995. Six years later in 2001, the track's capacity increased to 135,000 seats, giving the track the largest seating capacity of any sports venue in the mid-Atlantic region. In 2002, the name changed to Dover International Speedway from Dover Downs International Speedway after Dover Downs Gaming and Entertainment split, making Dover Motorsports. From 2007 to 2009, the speedway worked on an improvement project called "The Monster Makeover", which expanded facilities at the track and beautified the track. Depending on configuration, the track's capacity is at 95,500 seats. Its grand total maximum capacity was at 135,000 spectators. On November 8, 2021, it was announced that Dover Motorsports Inc. was purchased by Speedway Motorsports Inc.; effectively making Dover International Speedway a SMI track with the track being renamed to its current name.

=== Entry list ===
- (R) denotes rookie driver.

#	Driver	Team	Make	Sponsor
01	Stephanie Moyer	Fast Track Racing	Toyota	Evergreen Raceway Park
02	Leland Honeyman (R)	Young's Motorsports	Chevrolet	LH Waterfront Construction
6	Rajah Caruth	Rev Racing	Chevrolet	Max Siegel Inc., Virginia State University
10	Tim Monroe	Fast Track Racing	Toyota	Fast Track Racing
11	Ed Pompa	Fast Track Racing	Ford	Cen Pe Co, Double H Ranch
12	Tommy Vigh Jr.	Fast Track Racing	Chevrolet	Fast Track Racing
15	Conner Jones	Venturini Motorsports	Toyota	Jones Utilities
17	Taylor Gray	David Gilliland Racing	Ford	Ford Performance Driving School
18	Sammy Smith	Kyle Busch Motorsports	Toyota	TMC Transportation
20	Jesse Love	Venturini Motorsports	Toyota	Yahoo!
22	Eric Caudell**	CCM Racing	Chevrolet	CCM Racing
25	Jake Finch	Venturini Motorsports	Toyota	Phoenix Construction
30	Max Gutiérrez**	Rette Jones Racing	Ford	Toughbuilt
42	Christian Rose	Cook Racing Technologies	Toyota	Visit West Virginia
48	Brad Smith	Brad Smith Motorsports	Chevrolet	PSST...Copraya Websites
55	Jonathan Shafer	Venturini Motorsports	Toyota	Venturini Motorsports
60	Daniel Escoto (R)	Josh Williams Motorsports with Lira Motorsports	Chevrolet	JW Motorsports

**Withdrew prior to the event.

== Practice/Qualifying ==
Practice and qualifying was both combined into one 90-minute session, with a driver's fastest time counting as their qualifying lap. It was held on Friday, April 29, at 1:15 PM EST. Taylor Gray of David Gilliland Racing was the fastest in the session, with a time of 22.372 seconds and a speed of 160.915 mph (258.968 km/h).

Pos.	#	Driver	Team	Make	Time	Speed
1	17	Taylor Gray	David Gilliland Racing	Ford	22.372	160.915
2	18	Sammy Smith	Kyle Busch Motorsports	Toyota	22.466	160.242
3	02	Leland Honeyman (R)	Young's Motorsports	Chevrolet	22.630	159.081
4	20	Jesse Love	Venturini Motorsports	Toyota	22.734	158.353
5	6	Rajah Caruth	Rev Racing	Chevrolet	22.758	158.186
6	15	Conner Jones	Venturini Motorsports	Toyota	22.803	157.874
7	25	Jake Finch	Venturini Motorsports	Toyota	22.943	156.911
8	55	Jonathan Shafer	Venturini Motorsports	Toyota	23.152	155.494
9	60	Daniel Escoto (R)	Josh Williams Motorsports with Lira Motorsports	Chevrolet	24.214	148.674
10	42	Christian Rose	Cook Racing Technologies	Toyota	24.253	148.435
11	11	Ed Pompa	Fast Track Racing	Ford	25.043	143.753
12	01	Stephanie Moyer	Fast Track Racing	Toyota	28.898	124.576
13	12	Tommy Vigh Jr.	Fast Track Racing	Chevrolet	30.110	119.562
14	48	Brad Smith	Brad Smith Motorsports	Chevrolet	30.193	119.233
15	10	Tim Monroe	Fast Track Racing	Toyota	30.726	117.165
Official practice/qualifying results

== Race results ==
Laps: 125

Fin.	St	#	Driver	Team	Make	Laps	Led	Status	Points
1	1	17	Taylor Gray	David Gilliland Racing	Ford	125	116	Running	49
2	4	20	Jesse Love	Venturini Motorsports	Toyota	125	9	Running	43
3	6	15	Conner Jones	Venturini Motorsports	Toyota	125	0	Running	41
4	5	6	Rajah Caruth	Rev Racing	Chevrolet	125	0	Running	40
5	2	18	Sammy Smith	Kyle Busch Motorsports	Toyota	125	0	Running	39
6	7	25	Jake Finch	Venturini Motorsports	Toyota	125	0	Running	38
7	8	55	Jonathan Shafer	Venturini Motorsports	Toyota	125	0	Running	37
8	3	02	Leland Honeyman (R)	Young's Motorsports	Chevrolet	124	0	Running	36
9	9	60	Daniel Escoto (R)	Josh Williams Motorsports with Lira Motorsports	Chevrolet	124	0	Running	35
10	10	42	Christian Rose	Cook Racing Technologies	Toyota	123	0	Running	34
11	14	48	Brad Smith	Brad Smith Motorsports	Chevrolet	81	0	DNF	33
12	12	01	Stephanie Moyer	Fast Track Racing	Toyota	38	0	Mechanical	32
13	13	12	Tommy Vigh Jr.	Fast Track Racing	Chevrolet	29	0	Vibration	31
14	15	10	Tim Monroe	Fast Track Racing	Toyota	8	0	Mechanical	30
15	11	11	Ed Pompa	Fast Track Racing	Ford	7	0	Mechanical	29
Official race results

Previous race: 2022 Pensacola 200	ARCA Menards Series East; 2022 season	Next race: 2022 Music City 200
