= Lira Motorsports =

NASCAR team

- Owner(s): Carlos Lira; Amanda Lira
- Base: Mooresville, North Carolina; Port Orange, Florida
- Series: NASCAR Camping World Truck Series; ARCA Menards Series
- Race drivers: ARCA Menards Series: 60. Michael Lira; ARCA Menards Series East: 60. Logan Misuraca, Daniel Escoto, Michael Lira
- Manufacturer: Chevrolet; Ford
- Opened: 2015

Career
- Debut: Camping World Truck Series: 2015 Ford EcoBoost 200 (Homestead); ARCA Menards Series: 2015 Lucas Oil 200 (Daytona)
- Latest race: ARCA Menards Series: 2016 Corrigan Oil 200 (Michigan)
- Races competed: Total: 77; Camping World Truck Series: 2 ARCA Menards Series: 75
- Drivers' Championships: Total: 0 Camping World Truck Series: 0 ARCA Menards Series: 0
- Race victories: Total: 2 Camping World Truck Series: 0 ARCA Menards Series: 2
- Pole positions: Total: 0 Camping World Truck Series: 0 ARCA Menards Series: 0

Lira Motorsports is an American professional stock car racing team that competes in the ARCA Menards Series and ARCA Menards Series East. Owned by Carlos and Amanda Lira, the team made its debut in the ARCA Menards Series in 2015, fielding multiple cars and drivers throughout the year. The team made its Camping World Truck Series debut on November 20, 2015 at Homestead-Miami Speedway. Lira Motorsports also fields cars in NASCAR Whelen All-American Late Model Series competition. Lira Motorsports is a driver development satellite team for Roush Fenway Racing.

The team runs the No. 60 for drivers Logan Misuraca, Daniel Escoto, and Michael Lira.

== Camping World Truck Series ==
=== Truck No. 58 history ===
Lira Motorsports made their Truck Series debut in November 2015, with Kyle Weatherman driving at Homestead in the No. 58 Ford F-150, where he qualified 21st and finished 23rd. For 2016, Ryan Reed attempted the season opener at Daytona, but failed to qualify.

=== Truck No. 59 history ===
Lira Motorsports fielded the No. 59 Ford F-150 for David Levine at Homestead in 2015, where he qualified 22nd and finished 17th. Korbin Forrister took over the truck in 2016. The 59 failed to qualify at the Daytona season opener, and the following week at Atlanta.

== ARCA Menards Series ==
=== Car No. 6 history ===
After being inactive in the ARCA Racing Series, the team field the No. 6 car for Michael Lira.

=== Car No. 36 history ===
The No. 36 car made its debut at Salem Speedway on August 19, 2015 in the Federated Car Care Fall Classic 200. It was driven by Brandon Lynn, who qualified 13th and also finished in the 13th position. The second race for the number 36 car was the Crosley Brands 150 at Kentucky Speedway on September 26, 2015. In that race, Chris Windom drove the car, qualifying 11th and finishing 8th. The third and final race for the No. 36 car in 2015 was on October 16 at Kansas Speedway. In that race, Jairo Avila Jr. raced the car, qualifying 15th and finishing 10th.

=== Car No. 38 history ===
The No. 38 car was driven by John Lowinski-Loh at Chicagoland Speedway in June 2015. The car suffered an engine failure during the race and finished 23rd. The second race for the No. 38 car was with driver Blake Jones at the No. ThisIsMySpeedway150 at Iowa Speedway on July 17, 2015. In the race, Blake qualified 13th and finished 7th. The third race for the No. 38 car was with driver Tyler Dippel at the Federated Car Care 200 at Salem Speedway on September 19, 2015. Dippel qualified 4th, and raced to a 4th-place finish. He also won the Scott Rookie of the Race Award for the race. It was his first series top 5 finish.

Car No. 38 recorded the second ARCA Racing Series win for the team at Kentucky Speedway on September 26 with driver Ryan Reed. He won the Crosley Brands 150 after leading the final 20 laps of the race. Reed also raced the No. 38 car in the following race at Kansas Speedway, qualifying 12th and finishing in 4th place.

In 2016, Gray Gaulding drove the No. 38 car sponsored by Krispy Kreme at Daytona, where he finished 9th. In March, the team held a test at the Nashville Fairgrounds Speedway, and hired reigning Speed Energy Formula Off-Road champion Sheldon Creed to drive the No. 38 full-time for the remainder 2016 season. Ryan Reed drove the car at Pocono with Lilly Diabetes sponsorship.

=== Car No. 58 history ===
Ryan Reed in the No. 58 at Chicagoland Speedway in 2015

The No. 58 car competed in all 20 of the 2015 ARCA Racing Series events utilizing eight different drivers. Michael Lira, the initial primary driver of the car, did not meet age requirements to compete at four races during the first half of the ARCA Racing season. John Lowinski-Loh drove the car at Daytona in February. Cole Powell drove the car at Talladega Superspeedway in May and Michigan International Speedway in June. Ryan Reed drove the car to the teams first ARCA Series win at Chicagoland Speedway in June. After Lira raced the No. 58 car at the next three races (Winchester 6/28, Iowa 7/17, Lucas Oil 7/24), the team switched drivers multiple times in the remaining 2015 races. Jairo Avila Jr. drover the car at Pocono Raceway (8/1), Blake Jones raced the car at Berlin Raceway (8/8) and again at Salem Speedway (9/19). Tyler Dippel drove the No. 58 car at the Illinois State Fairgrounds (8/23) and the DuQuoin State Fairgrounds (9/7). Brandon Lynn drove the No. 58 car at Kentucky Speedway (9/26) and Kansas Speedway (10/16). The best finish for the No. 58 car during the stretch between Ryan Reed's win at Chicagoland and the end of the season was by Blake Jones, who started 11th and finished 8th in the Federated Auto Parts 200 at Berlin Raceway.

The team hired Kyle Weatherman to drive full-time in the No. 58 for the 2016 season.

=== Car No. 59 history ===
David Levine's No. 59 car at Kentucky Speedway in 2015

For 2015, David Levine was signed to compete as the primary driver of the No. 59 car. Levine raced the No. 59 car to a total of 11 top ten finishes, 1 top five finish and 4 top ten starts in 2015. His best finish for the year was 3rd at Kentucky Speedway on September 26.

=== Car No. 60 history ===
Lira was intended to return in 2021 but failed to do so. In 2022, Michael Lira returned to the series driving the No. 60 Ford for Lira with sponsorship from Girem Tile Work.

== ARCA Menards Series East ==
=== Car No. 60 history ===
In 2022, Logan Misuraca made her stock car debut at New Smyrna, Daniel Escoto will run a majority of the season, and Michael Lira drove at Nashville Fairgrounds.

== NASCAR Whelen All-American Series Late Models ==
In 2015, Michael Lira competed in a part-time schedule of Pro Late Model and Super Late Model races in cars built and prepared by Lira Motorsports. Through the first half of 2015, he has four top five finishes and two wins in a Pro Late Model and one top five finish in a Super Late Model, all at New Smyrna Speedway in Florida.
