= 2022 Race to Stop Suicide 200 =

2022 Race to Stop Suicide 200 presented by Place of Hope at New Smyrna Speedway
Race details
- Race 1 of 7 in the 2022 ARCA Menards Series East season
- Date: February 15, 2022
- Location: New Smyrna Speedway in New Smyrna Beach, Florida
- Course: Permanent racing facility
- Course length: 0.77 km (0.48 miles)
- Distance: 200 laps, 96.00 mi (154.497 km)
- Average speed: 48.275

Pole position
Driver	Sammy Smith	Kyle Busch Motorsports
- Time: 18.506

Most laps led
Driver	Sammy Smith	Kyle Busch Motorsports
- Laps: 167

Winner
No. 18	Sammy Smith	Kyle Busch Motorsports

The 2022 Race to Stop Suicide 200 was an ARCA Menards Series East race that was held on February 15, 2022. It was contested over 200 laps on the 0.48-mile (0.77 km) short track. It was the first race of the 2022 ARCA Menards Series East season. Kyle Busch Motorsports driver Sammy Smith, the reigning champion, collected his first win of the season.

== Background ==
=== Entry list ===
- (R) denotes rookie driver.
- (i) denotes driver who is ineligible for series driver points.

No.	Driver	Team	Manufacturer	Sponsor
0	Zachary Tinkle	Wayne Peterson Racing	Chevrolet	GreatRailing.com
01	Stephanie Moyer	Fast Track Racing	Toyota	EvergreenRacewayPark.com
02	Leland Honeyman	Young's Motorsports	Chevrolet	LH Waterfront Constr, Besecker & Maynard
10	Ed Pompa	Fast Track Racing	Toyota	Cen-Pe-Co Lubricants, Double H Ranch
11	Willie Mullins	Fast Track Racing	Toyota	Crow Wing Recycling
12	Tony Cosentino	Fast Track Racing	Toyota	Fast Track High Performance Driving
14	Andrew Tuttle*	Last Chance Racing	Ford	Gearhead Coffee
17	Taylor Gray	David Gilliland Racing	Ford	Place of Hope
18	Sammy Smith	Joe Gibbs Racing	Toyota	TMC Transportation
22	Steve Austin	CCM Racing	Chevrolet	Red Tide Canopies, Coble Enterprises
30	Max Gutiérrez	Rette Jones Racing	Ford	Toughbuilt
42	Christian Rose	Cook Racing Technologies	Toyota	Visit West Virginia
44	Mason Diaz	Ferrier-McClure Racing	Ford	Solid Rock Carriers, Prince William Marina
48	Brad Smith	Brad Smith Motorsports	Chevrolet	PSST... Copraya Websites
49	Ashton Higgins*	ALH Motorsports	Toyota	Leapfrog Landscaping
60	Logan Misuraca	Josh Williams Motorsports	Chevrolet	Girem Tile Work
74	Donald Theetge	Visconti Motorsports	Toyota	Groupe Theetge, XPN Nutrients
95	Caleb Costner	Costner Weaver Motorsports	Chevrolet	Innovative Tiny Houses
Official entry list

== Practice/Qualifying ==
Practice and qualifying were both combined into one 90-minute session, with a driver's fastest time counting as their qualifying lap.

Pos	No.	Driver	Team	Make	Time	Speed
1	18	Sammy Smith	Joe Gibbs Racing	Toyota	18.506	93.375
2	17	Taylor Gray	David Gilliland Racing	Ford	18.523	93.289
3	74	Donald Theetge	Visconti Motorsports	Toyota	18.973	91.077
4	02	Leland Honeyman	Young's Motorsports	Chevrolet	18.986	91.014
5	44	Mason Diaz	Ferrier-McClure Racing	Ford	19.156	90.207
6	60	Logan Misuraca	Josh Williams Motorsports	Chevrolet	19.204	89.981
7	30	Max Gutiérrez	Rette Jones Racing	Ford	19.232	89.85
8	11	Willie Mullins	Fast Track Racing	Toyota	19.336	89.367
9	42	Christian Rose	Cook Racing Technologies	Toyota	19.645	87.961
10	01	Stephanie Moyer	Fast Track Racing	Toyota	19.712	87.662
11	10	Ed Pompa	Fast Track Racing	Toyota	20.173	85.659
12	12	Tony Cosentino	Fast Track Racing	Toyota	20.443	84.528
13	22	Steve Austin	CCM Racing	Chevrolet	20.830	82.957
14	48	Brad Smith	Brad Smith Motorsports	Chevrolet	23.261	74.287
15	0	Zachary Tinkle	Wayne Peterson Racing	Chevrolet		
16	95	Caleb Costner	Costner Motorsports	Chevrolet		
Official practice/qualifying results						

== Race results ==
Fin	St	#	Driver	Team	Make	Laps	Led	Pts	Status
1	1	18	Sammy Smith	Kyle Busch Motorsports	Toyota	200	167	49	Running
2	2	17	Taylor Gray	David Gilliland Racing	Ford	200	33	43	Running
3	7	30	Max Gutierrez	Rette Jones Racing	Ford	200	0	41	Running
4	4	02	Leland Honeyman	Young's Motorsports	Chevrolet	200	0	40	Running
5	3	74	Donald Theetge	Visconti Motorsports	Toyota	200	0	39	Running
6	5	44	Mason Diaz	Ferrier-McClure Racing	Ford	199	0	38	Running
7	6	60	Logan Misuraca	Josh Williams Motorsports	Chevrolet	199	0	37	Running
8	8	11	Willie Mullins	Fast Track Racing	Toyota	198	0	36	Running
9	10	01	Stephanie Moyer	Fast Track Racing	Toyota	193	0	35	Running
10	11	10	Ed Pompa	Fast Track Racing	Toyota	190	0	34	Running
11	9	42	Christian Rose	Cook Racing Technologies	Toyota	145	0	33	Crash
12	13	22	Steve Austin	CCM Racing	Chevrolet	122	0	32	Brakes
13	15	95	Caleb Costner	Costner Motorsports	Chevrolet	47	0	31	Overheating
14	12	12	Tony Cosentino	Fast Track Racing	Toyota	21	0	30	Brakes
15	14	48	Brad Smith	Brad Smith Motorsports	Chevrolet	8	0	29	Engine
16	16	0	Zachary Tinkle	Wayne Peterson Racing	Ford	0	0	28	Transmission
Withdrew
WD		14	Andrew Tuttle	Last Chance Racing	Ford				
WD		49	Ashton Higgins	ALH Motorsports	Toyota				
Official race results

Previous race: 2021 Bush's Beans 200	ARCA Menards Series East; 2022 season	Next race: 2022 Pensacola 200
