= Ryan Roulette =

American racing driver (born 1986)

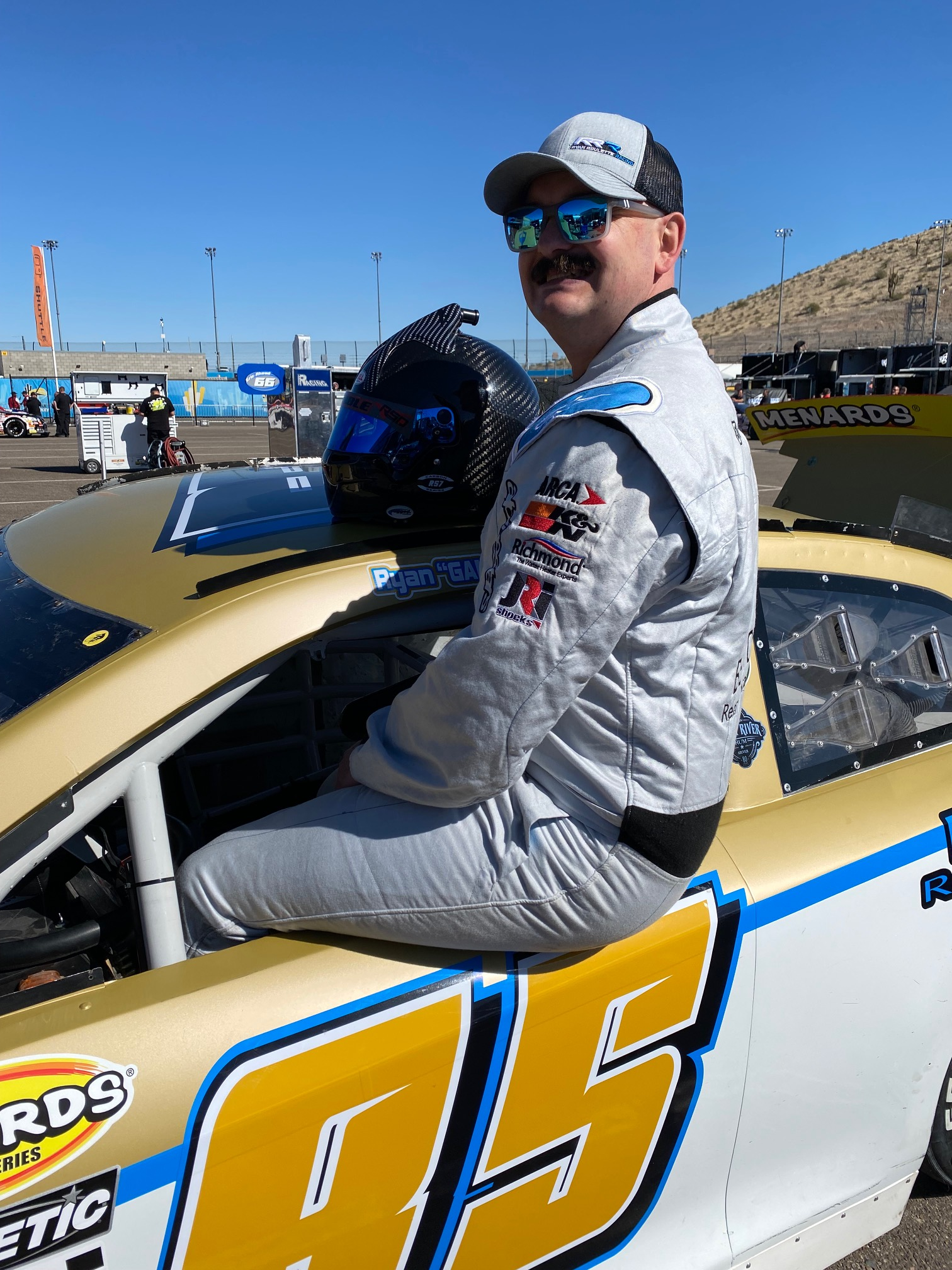
- Roulette at Phoenix Raceway in 2022
- Born: March 8, 1986 (age 40); Knob Noster, Missouri, U.S.

NASCAR FedEx Freight Truck Series career
- 3 races run over 1 year
- 2025 position: 61st
- Best finish: 61st (2025)
- First race: 2025 Boys & Girls Club of the Blue Ridge 200 (Martinsville)
- Last race: 2025 eero 250 (Richmond)
Wins	Top tens	Poles
0	0	0

ARCA Menards Series career
- 20 races run over 4 years
- Best finish: 17th (2024)
- First race: 2022 General Tire 150 (Phoenix)
- Last race: 2025 Reese's 150 (Kansas)
Wins	Top tens	Poles
0	2	0

ARCA Menards Series East career
- 6 races run over 4 years
- Best finish: 27th (2023)
- First race: 2022 Music City 200 (Nashville Fairgrounds)
- Last race: 2025 General Tire 150 (Dover)
Wins	Top tens	Poles
0	1	0

ARCA Menards Series West career
- 4 races run over 4 years
- Best finish: 63rd (2022)
- First race: 2021 Arizona Lottery 100 (Phoenix)
- Last race: 2024 General Tire 150 (Phoenix)
Wins	Top tens	Poles
0	0	0
- Statistics up to date as of November 1, 2025.

Ryan "Gamble" Roulette (born March 8, 1986) is an American professional stock car racing driver. He last competed part-time in the NASCAR Craftsman Truck Series, driving the No. 67 Chevrolet Silverado RST for Freedom Racing Enterprises and part-time in the ARCA Menards Series, driving the No. 67 Ford Mustang for Maples Motorsports. He has previously competed in both the ARCA Menards Series East and ARCA Menards Series West.

== Racing career ==
=== Early racing career ===
Roulette has been racing across the United States over the past 15+ years. He has been seen at multiple dirt oval tracks racing in Karts, 4-Cylinder Mini Stocks, Mini Sprint, B-Mods, Legends Car Racing, Midget Car Racing, and Sprint Car Racing (both Wing and Non-wing). He also has some time behind the wheel on a Road Course in Sports Car Racing at the Nürburgring, and asphalt oval track racing in a Pro Late Model at Madera Speedway in Madera, California.

=== ARCA Menards Series ===
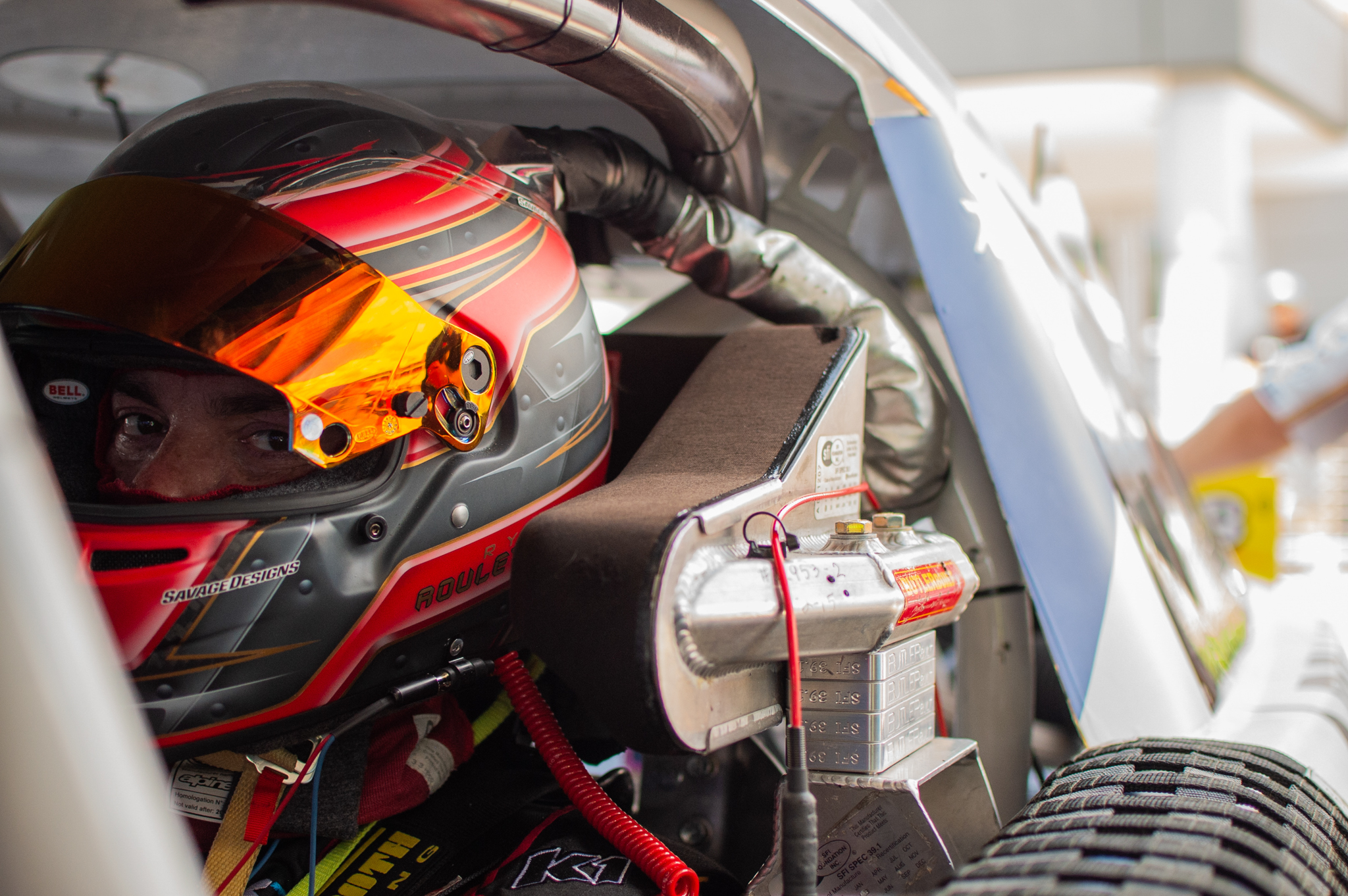
Roulette at Charlotte Motor Speedway in 2024

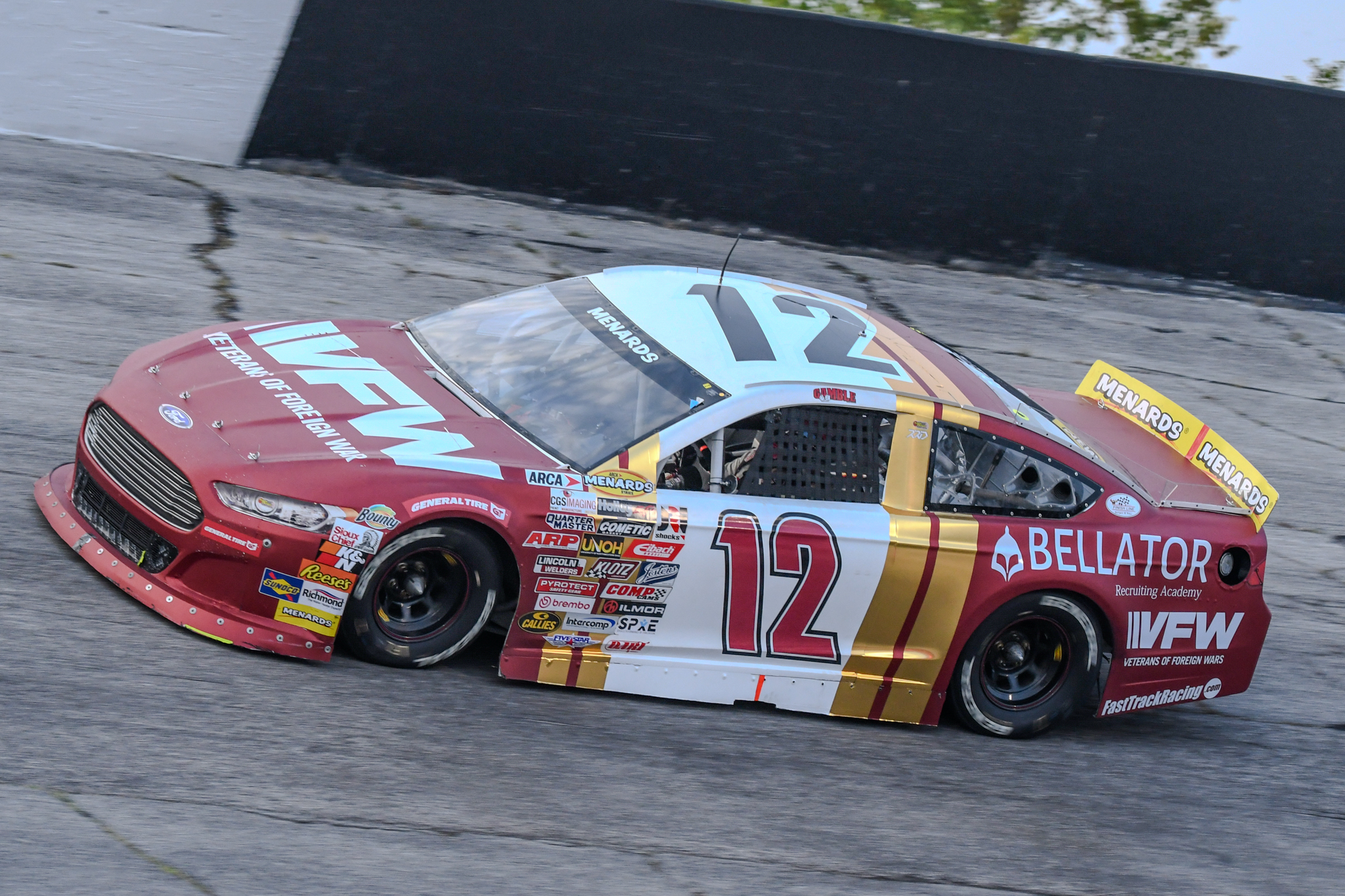
Roulette's No. 12 car at Salem Speedway in 2024

Roulette would first sign with Performance P-1 Motorsports to race the No. 77 Toyota Camry at the 2021 Arizona Lottery 100 in Phoenix Raceway. Roulette would eventually finish 28th due to reported issues with the car and growing pains with the team. In 2022, Roulette would sign with Last Chance Racing and race the No. 85 Toyota Camry at the General Tire 150 in Phoenix Raceway. Later that season, Roulette signed with Fast Track Racing where he achieved his first top-ten finish in the ARCA East Series at Nashville Fairground. In 2023, Roulette stayed on with Fast Track Racing where he ran at the East Series race at Nashville, where he finished in twelfth, the main series race at Elko Speedway, where he once againfinished in twelfth, and at the combination race at Bristol Motor Speedway, where he finished in eighteenth.

In 2024, Roulette announced that he would run select ARCA Series events driving for Fast Track Racing in the No. 12 Ford. Across the year, he ran eleven races and achieved a best finish of eighth at Salem Speedway, and finished seventeenth in the points standings.

=== NASCAR Craftsman Truck Series ===
On January 22, 2025, it was announced that Roulette would run a partial schedule in the NASCAR Craftsman Truck Series, driving the No. 67 Chevrolet for Freedom Racing Enterprises.

== Personal life ==
Along with racing, Roulette is a United States Air Force pilot.

== Motorsports career results ==
=== Stock car career summary ===
Season	Series	Team	Races	Wins	Top 5	Top 10	Points	Position
2021	ARCA Menards Series West	Performance P–1 Motorsports	1	0	0	0	16	64th
2022	ARCA Menards Series West	Last Chance Racing	1	0	0	0	22	63rd
2022	ARCA Menards Series East	Fast Track Racing	1	0	0	1	34	46th
2022	ARCA Menards Series	Last Chance Racing	1	0	0	0	22	108th
2023	ARCA Menards Series West	Fast Track Racing	1	0	0	0	20	70th
2023	ARCA Menards Series East	Fast Track Racing	2	0	0	0	58	27th
2023	ARCA Menards Series	Fast Track Racing	2	0	0	0	58	63rd
2024	ARCA Menards Series West	Fast Track Racing	1	0	0	0	16	73rd
2024	ARCA Menards Series East	Fast Track Racing	2	0	0	0	56	33rd
2024	ARCA Menards Series	Fast Track Racing	11	0	0	1	262	17th
2025	ARCA Menards Series East	Maples Motorsports	1	0	0	0	27	62nd
2025	ARCA Menards Series	Maples Motorsports	6	0	0	1	160	23rd
2025	NASCAR Craftsman Truck Series	Freedom Racing Enterprises	3	0	0	0	15	61st

=== NASCAR ===
(key) (Bold – Pole position awarded by qualifying time. Italics – Pole position earned by points standings or practice time. * – Most laps led.)

==== Craftsman Truck Series ====
NASCAR Craftsman Truck Series results
Year	Team	No.	Make	1	2	3	4	5	6	7	8	9	10	11	12	13	14	15	16	17	18	19	20	21	22	23	24	25	NCTC	Pts	Ref
2025	Freedom Racing Enterprises	67	Chevy	DAY	ATL	LVS	HOM	MAR; 35	BRI	CAR	TEX	KAN	NWS; 32	CLT	NSH	MCH	POC	LRP	IRP	GLN	RCH; 29	DAR	BRI	NHA	ROV	TAL	MAR	PHO	61st	15	

^{*} Season still in progress
^{1} Ineligible for series points

=== ARCA Menards Series ===
(key) (Bold – Pole position awarded by qualifying time. Italics – Pole position earned by points standings or practice time. * – Most laps led.)

ARCA Menards Series results
Year	Team	No.	Make	1	2	3	4	5	6	7	8	9	10	11	12	13	14	15	16	17	18	19	20	AMSC	Pts	Ref
2022	Last Chance Racing	85	Toyota	DAY	PHO; 22	TAL	KAN	CLT	IOW	BLN	ELK	MOH	POC	IRP	MCH	GLN	ISF	MLW	DSF	KAN	BRI	SLM	TOL	108th	22	
2023	Fast Track Racing	12	Ford	DAY	PHO	TAL	KAN	CLT	BLN	ELK; 12	MOH	IOW	POC	MCH	IRP	GLN	ISF	MLW	DSF	KAN	BRI; 18	SLM	TOL	63rd	58	
2024	Fast Track Racing	12	Ford	DAY; 23	PHO; 28	TAL; 20	DOV	KAN; 20	CLT; 16	IOW; 15	MOH	BLN; 15	IRP	SLM; 8	ELK; 14	MCH; 16	ISF	MLW; 17	DSF	GLN	BRI	KAN	TOL	17th	292	
2025	Maples Motorsports	67	Ford	DAY; 9	PHO	TAL; 21	KAN	CLT; 26	MCH; 12	BLN	ELK	LRP	DOV; 17	IRP	IOW	GLN	ISF	MAD	DSF	BRI	SLM	KAN; 14	TOL	23rd	160	

==== ARCA Menards Series East ====
ARCA Menards Series East results
Year	Team	No.	Make	1	2	3	4	5	6	7	8	AMSWC	Pts	Ref
2022	Fast Track Racing	11	Ford	NSM	FIF	DOV	NSV; 10	IOW	MLW	BRI		46th	34	
2023	Fast Track Racing	12	Ford	FIF	DOV	NSV	FRS; 12	IOW	IRP	MLW	BRI; 18	27th	58	
2024	Fast Track Racing	12	Ford	FIF	DOV	NSV	FRS	IOW; 15	IRP	MLW; 17	BRI	33rd	56	
2025	Maples Motorsports	67	Ford	FIF	CAR	NSV	FRS	DOV; 17	IRP	IOW	BRI	62nd	27	

==== ARCA Menards Series West ====
ARCA Menards Series West results
Year	Team	No.	Make	1	2	3	4	5	6	7	8	9	10	11	12	AMSWC	Pts	Ref
2021	Performance P-1 Motorsports	77	Toyota	PHO	SON	IRW	CNS	IRW	PIR	LVS	AAS	PHO; 28				64th	16	
2022	Last Chance Racing	85	Toyota	PHO; 22	IRW	KCR	PIR	SON	IRW	EVG	PIR	AAS	LVS	PHO		63rd	22	
2023	Fast Track Racing	12	Ford	PHO	IRW	KCR	PIR	SON	IRW	SHA	EVG	AAS	LVS	MAD	PHO; 24	70th	20	
2024	Fast Track Racing	12	Ford	PHO; 28	KER	PIR	SON	IRW	IRW	SHA	TRI	MAD	AAS	KER	PHO	73rd	16	
