= Christian Rose =

American racing driver (born 1995)

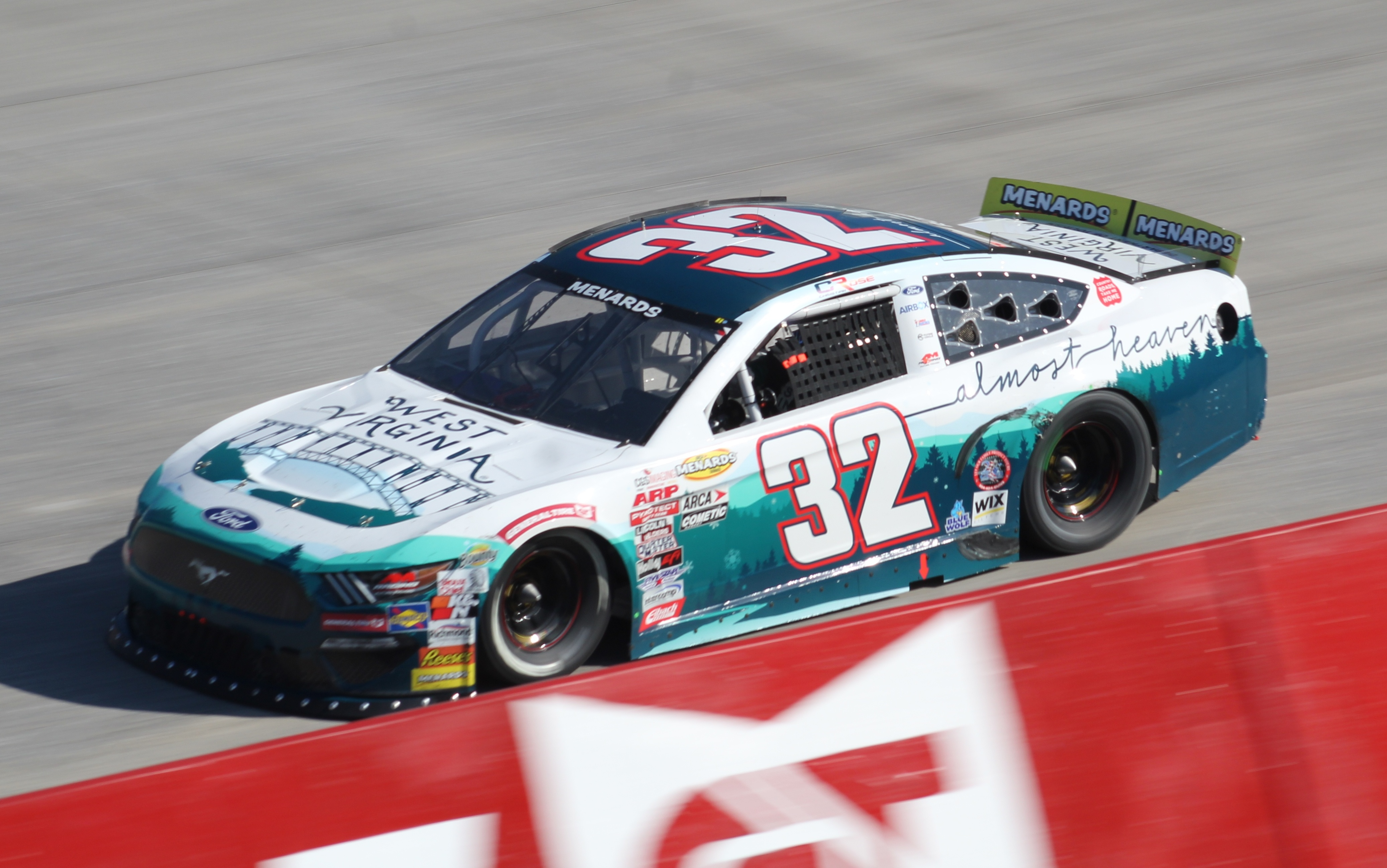
- Rose's No. 32 car during the ARCA race at Dover Motor Speedway in 2024
- Born: Christian Rauch Rose; June 14, 1995 (age 31); Martinsburg, West Virginia, U.S.

NASCAR FedEx Freight Truck Series career
- 2 races run over 1 year
- Best finish: 50th (2023)
- First race: 2023 Worldwide Express 250 (Richmond)
- Last race: 2023 Craftsman 150 (Phoenix)
Wins	Top tens	Poles
0	0	0

ARCA Menards Series career
- 48 races run over 3 years
- Best finish: 3rd (2023)
- First race: 2022 Lucas Oil 200 (Daytona)
- Last race: 2024 Owens Corning 200 (Toledo)
Wins	Top tens	Poles
0	24	0

ARCA Menards Series East career
- 15 races run over 3 years
- Best finish: 7th (2022)
- First race: 2022 Race to Stop Suicide 200 (New Smyrna)
- Last race: 2024 Bush's Beans 200 (Bristol)
Wins	Top tens	Poles
0	6	0

ARCA Menards Series West career
- 7 races run over 4 years
- Best finish: 27th (2021)
- First race: 2021 Star Nursery 150 (Las Vegas Bullring)
- Last race: 2024 General Tire 150 (Phoenix)
Wins	Top tens	Poles
0	2	0
- Statistics up to date as of November 8, 2024.

Christian Rauch Rose (born June 14, 1995) is an American professional stock car racing driver. He last competed full-time in the ARCA Menards Series, driving the No. 32 Ford Fusion for AM Racing. He has also previously competed in the NASCAR Craftsman Truck Series.

== Racing career ==
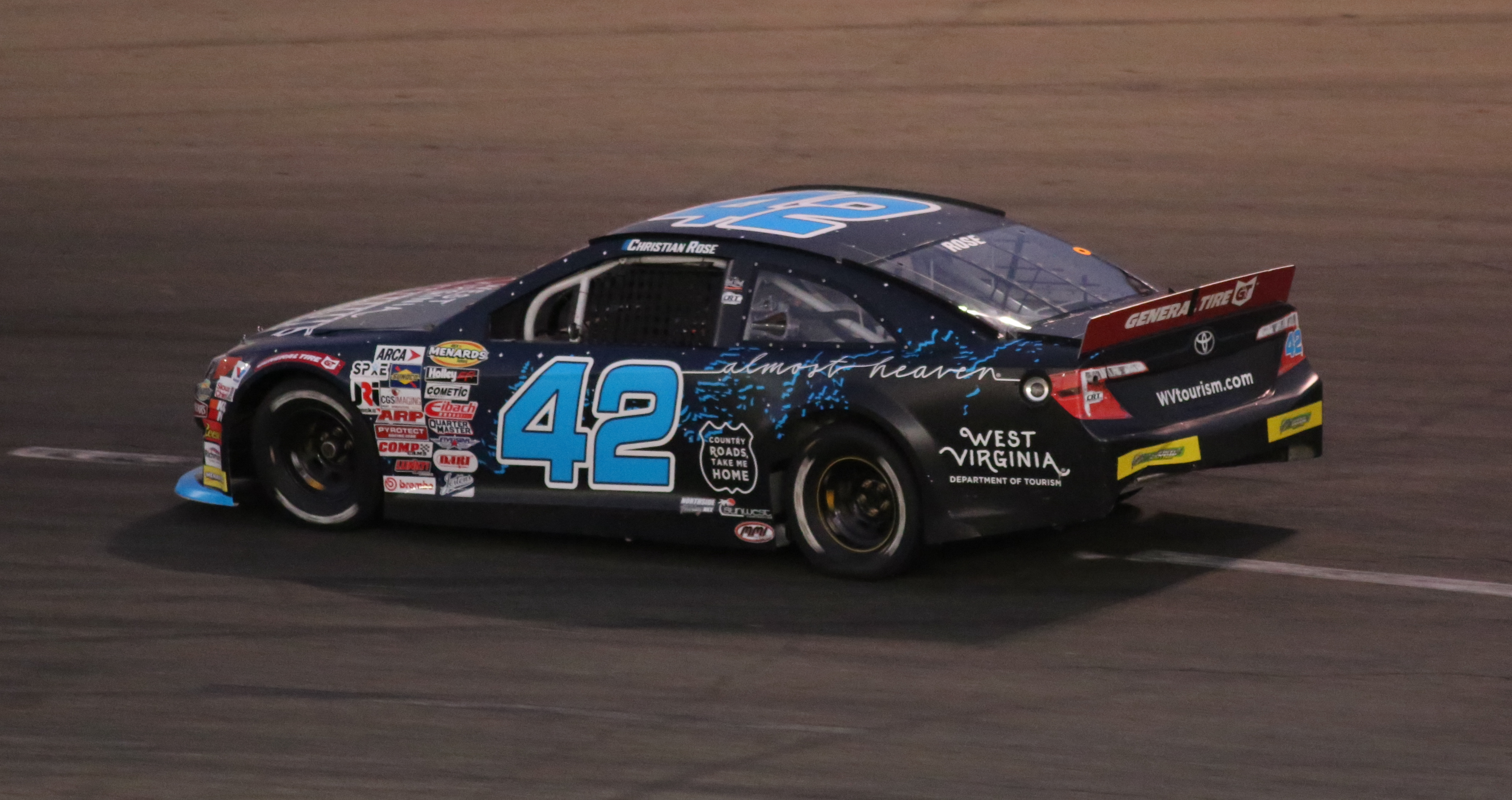
Rose's No. 42 car during the West Series race at All American Speedway in 2021

Rose made his ARCA Menards Series West debut in 2021. He made his debut at the Las Vegas Motor Speedway Bullring, finishing tenth. He followed that up, finishing seventh at the All-American Speedway.

In 2022, Rose entered in Phoenix in the combination race with the West Series and later on attempted the second race at Irwindale.

Rose made his ARCA Menards Series East debut in 2022 at New Smyrna Speedway. He would drive in the rest of the East Series races that year except for Iowa.

On January 10, 2023, AM Racing announced that Rose would drive full-time for the team in the main ARCA Series in 2023 in their No. 32 car as well as run part-time in the Truck Series for the team. He finished third in the ARCA points standings with thirteen top-ten finishes with a best finish of third at Salem Speedway. He ran two Truck Series races for AM at Richmond Raceway and Phoenix Raceway, finishing 32nd and sixteenth, respectively.

On April 22, 2023, Jamie Little stated during the broadcast of the ARCA race at Talladega that Rose would make his Xfinity Series debut sometime in 2023 for AM Racing, the team Rose drove for in ARCA which expanded into the Xfinity Series that year fielding a full-time car, the No. 25, for Brett Moffitt, although nothing would come to fruition.

On October 7, 2023, it was announced that Rose would return to AM Racing for the 2024 ARCA season. He finished fifth in the points after earning ten top-ten finishes.

On December 16, 2024, it was announced that Rose will run full-time in the NASCAR Craftsman Truck Series, driving the No. 44 Chevrolet for Niece Motorsports. However, on February 10, 2025, it was announced that Rose would not run full-time in the Truck Series due to unforeseen sponsorship changes. He has not raced since.

== Personal life ==
Prior to beginning his racing career, Rose played college baseball at the University of Maryland-Eastern Shore.

== Motorsports career results ==
=== NASCAR ===
(key) (Bold – Pole position awarded by qualifying time. Italics – Pole position earned by points standings or practice time. * – Most laps led.)

==== Craftsman Truck Series ====
NASCAR Craftsman Truck Series results
Year	Team	No.	Make	1	2	3	4	5	6	7	8	9	10	11	12	13	14	15	16	17	18	19	20	21	22	23	NCTC	Pts	Ref
2023	AM Racing	22	Ford	DAY	LVS	ATL	COA	TEX	BRD	MAR	KAN	DAR	NWS	CLT	GTW	NSH	MOH	POC	RCH; 32	IRP	MLW	KAN	BRI	TAL	HOM	PHO; 16	50th	26	

=== ARCA Menards Series ===
(key) (Bold – Pole position awarded by qualifying time. Italics – Pole position earned by points standings or practice time. * – Most laps led.)

ARCA Menards Series results
Year	Team	No.	Make	1	2	3	4	5	6	7	8	9	10	11	12	13	14	15	16	17	18	19	20	AMSC	Pts	Ref
2022	Cook Racing Technologies	42	Chevy	DAY; 31				CLT; 16	IOW	BLN	ELK	MOH	POC; 24	IRP; 20	MCH	GLN	ISF				BRI; 22	SLM	TOL	22nd	190	
2022	Cook Racing Technologies	42	Toyota		PHO; 27	TAL	KAN											MLW; 15	DSF	KAN; 7				22nd	190	
2023	AM Racing	32	Ford	DAY; 12	PHO; 23	TAL; 17	KAN; 9	CLT; 8	BLN; 7	ELK; 10	MOH; 11	IOW; 7	POC; 9	MCH; 7	IRP; 10	GLN; 11	ISF; 12	MLW; 11	DSF; 7	KAN; 6	BRI; 8	SLM; 3	TOL; 5	3rd	889	
2024	AM Racing	32	Ford	DAY; 4	PHO; 16	TAL; 5	DOV; 21	KAN; 14	CLT; 28	IOW; 11	MOH; 11	BLN; 9	IRP; 22	SLM; 5	ELK; 10	MCH; 9	ISF; 9	MLW; 8	DSF; 8	GLN; 16	BRI; 20	KAN; 13	TOL; 10	5th	832	

==== ARCA Menards Series East ====
ARCA Menards Series East results
Year	Team	No.	Make	1	2	3	4	5	6	7	8	AMSWC	Pts	Ref
2022	Cook Racing Technologies	42	Toyota	NSM; 11	FIF; 10	DOV; 10	NSV; 12	IOW	MLW; 15			7th	234	
2022	Cook Racing Technologies	42	Chevy							BRI; 22		7th	234	
2023	AM Racing	32	Ford	FIF	DOV	NSV	FRS	IOW; 7	IRP; 10	MLW; 11	BRI; 8	13th	190	
2024	AM Racing	32	Ford	FIF	DOV; 21	NSV	FRS	IOW; 11	IRP; 22	MLW; 8	BRI; 20	14th	188	

==== ARCA Menards Series West ====
ARCA Menards Series West results
Year	Team	No.	Make	1	2	3	4	5	6	7	8	9	10	11	12	AMSWC	Pts	Ref
2021	Cook-Finley Racing	42	Toyota	PHO	SON	IRW	CNS	IRW	PIR	LVS; 10	AAS; 7	PHO				27th	71	
2022	Cook Racing Technologies	42	Toyota	PHO; 27	IRW	KCR	PIR	SON	IRW; 16	EVG	PIR	AAS	LVS	PHO; 21		29th	118	
2023	AM Racing	32	Ford	PHO; 23	IRW	KCR	PIR	SON	IRW	SHA	EVG	AAS	LVS	MAD	PHO	67th	21	
2024	AM Racing	32	Ford	PHO; 16	IRW	PIR	SON	IRW	IRW	SHA	TRI	MAD	AAS	KER	PHO	63rd	28	

=== CARS Super Late Model Tour ===
(key)

CARS Super Late Model Tour results
Year	Team	No.	Make	1	2	3	4	5	6	7	8	CSLMTC	Pts	Ref
2019	N/A	26	Chevy	SNM	HCY	NSH; 29	MMS	BRI	HCY	ROU	SBO	55th	2	
