= 2023 Bush's Beans 200 =

18th race of the 2023 ARCA Menards Series

Race details
- Race 18 of 20 of the 2023 ARCA Menards Series; Race 8 of 8 of the 2023 ARCA Menards Series East
- Date: September 14, 2023
- Official name: Third Annual Bush's Beans 200
- Location: Bristol Motor Speedway, Bristol, Tennessee
- Course: Permanent racing facility
- Course length: 0.533 miles (0.858 km)
- Distance: 200 laps, 106 mi (171 km)
- Scheduled distance: 200 laps, 106 mi (171 km)
- Average speed: 120.308 mph (193.617 km/h)

Pole position
| Driver | William Sawalich | Joe Gibbs Racing |
- Time: 15.086

Most laps led
| Driver | Jesse Love | Venturini Motorsports |
- Laps: 158

Winner
| No. 18 | William Sawalich | Joe Gibbs Racing |

Television in the United States
- Network: FS1
- Announcers: Jamie Little, Phil Parsons, and Ryan Blaney

Radio in the United States
- Radio: MRN

The 2023 Bush's Beans 200 was the 18th stock car race of the 2023 ARCA Menards Series season, the 8th and final race of the 2023 ARCA Menards Series East season, and the third iteration of the event. The race was held on Thursday, September 14, 2023, in Bristol, Tennessee at Bristol Motor Speedway, a 0.533 miles (0.858 km) permanent oval shaped racetrack. The race took the scheduled 200 laps to complete. William Sawalich, driving for Joe Gibbs Racing, would take advantage of a late-race restart, and held off Jesse Love to earn his third career ARCA Menards Series win, his fourth career ARCA Menards Series East win, and his fifth of the season. Love would dominate the entire race, leading a race-high 158 laps. To fill out the podium, Love, driving for Venturini Motorsports, and Andrés Pérez de Lara, driving for Rev Racing, would finish 2nd and 3rd, respectively.

In addition to winning, Sawalich would claim the 2023 ARCA Menards Series East championship, 58 points ahead of Luke Fenhaus, who suffered a flat tire in the race and ending his contention of winning. This was Sawalich's first championship, and the third consecutive championship for the 18 car.

== Background ==
The Bristol Motor Speedway, formerly known as Bristol International Raceway and Bristol Raceway, is a NASCAR short track venue located in Bristol, Tennessee. Constructed in 1960, it held its first NASCAR race on July 30, 1961. Despite its short length, Bristol is among the most popular tracks on the NASCAR schedule because of its distinct features, which include extraordinarily steep banking, an all concrete surface, two pit roads, and stadium-like seating. It has also been named one of the loudest NASCAR tracks.

=== Entry list ===
- (R) denotes rookie driver.

| # | Driver | Team | Make | Sponsor |
|---|---|---|---|---|
| 01 | Tim Monroe | Fast Track Racing | Toyota | Universal Technical Institute |
| 1 | Jake Finch | Phoenix Racing | Toyota | Phoenix Construction |
| 2 | Andrés Pérez de Lara (R) | Rev Racing | Chevrolet | Max Siegel Inc. |
| 03 | Alex Clubb | Clubb Racing Inc. | Ford | Clubb Racing Inc. |
| 3 | Landon Pembelton | Mullins Racing | Ford | Pembelton Forest Products |
| 06 | A. J. Moyer (R) | Wayne Peterson Racing | Ford | River's Edge Cottages & RV Park |
| 6 | Lavar Scott (R) | Rev Racing | Chevrolet | Max Siegel Inc. |
| 10 | D. L. Wilson | Fast Track Racing | Toyota | Heart O' Texas Speedway |
| 11 | Zachary Tinkle | Fast Track Racing | Toyota | Racing for Rescues |
| 12 | Ryan Roulette | Fast Track Racing | Ford | Bellator, VFW |
| 15 | Sean Hingorani (R) | Venturini Motorsports | Toyota | GearWrench |
| 17 | Kaden Honeycutt | McGowan Motorsports | Toyota | MMI, Sunwest Construction |
| 18 | William Sawalich (R) | Joe Gibbs Racing | Toyota | Starkey, SoundGear |
| 20 | Jesse Love | Venturini Motorsports | Toyota | JBL |
| 25 | Conner Jones | Venturini Motorsports | Toyota | Jones Utilities |
| 28 | Luke Fenhaus (R) | Pinnacle Racing Group | Chevrolet | Chevrolet Performance |
| 30 | Frankie Muniz (R) | Rette Jones Racing | Ford | Ford Performance |
| 31 | Rita Goulet (R) | Rise Motorsports | Chevrolet | NationalPolice.org |
| 32 | Christian Rose (R) | AM Racing | Ford | West Virginia Tourism |
| 35 | Greg Van Alst | Greg Van Alst Motorsports | Ford | CB Fabricating |
| 42 | Matt Gould | Cook Racing Technologies | Chevrolet | MMI, Sunwest Construction |
| 48 | Brad Smith | Brad Smith Motorsports | Chevrolet | Oktoberfest Race Weekend |
| 51 | Jack Wood | Rev Racing | Chevrolet | Max Siegel Inc. |
| 55 | Toni Breidinger | Venturini Motorsports | Toyota | Venturini Motorsports |
| 66 | Jon Garrett (R) | Veer Motorsports | Chevrolet | Fort Worth Screen Printing |
| 69 | Mike Basham | Kimmel Racing | Ford | Kimmel Racing |
| 73 | Andy Jankowiak | KLAS Motorsports | Toyota | Mike's Golf Carts |
| 87 | Charles Buchanan | Charles Buchanan Racing | Ford | Spring Drug |
| 93 | Caleb Costner | Costner Weaver Motorsports | Chevrolet | Innovative Tiny Houses, Lickety Lew's |
| 95 | Tanner Arms | MAN Motorsports | Toyota | Sunset Park RV Manufacturing |
| 97 | Landen Lewis | CR7 Motorsports | Chevrolet | Grant County Mulch |
| 98 | Dale Shearer | Shearer Speed Racing | Toyota | Shearer Speed Racing |
Official entry list

== Practice ==
The first and only practice session was held on Thursday, September 14, at 2:45 p.m. EST, and would last for 45 minutes. Jesse Love, driving for Venturini Motorsports, would set the fastest time in the session, with a lap of 15.110, and an average speed of 126.989 mph (204.369 km/h).

| Pos. | # | Driver | Team | Make | Time | Speed |
|---|---|---|---|---|---|---|
| 1 | 20 | Jesse Love | Venturini Motorsports | Toyota | 15.110 | 126.989 |
| 2 | 18 | William Sawalich (R) | Joe Gibbs Racing | Toyota | 15.123 | 126.880 |
| 3 | 97 | Landen Lewis | CR7 Motorsports | Chevrolet | 15.230 | 125.988 |
Full practice results

== Qualifying ==
Qualifying was held on Thursday, September 14, at 3:00 p.m. EST. The qualifying system used is a single-car, multi-lap system with only one round. Whoever sets the fastest time in that round wins the pole. William Sawalich, driving for Joe Gibbs Racing, would score the pole for the race, with a lap of 15.086, and an average speed of 127.191 mph (204.694 km/h).

| Pos. | # | Driver | Team | Make | Time | Speed |
|---|---|---|---|---|---|---|
| 1 | 18 | William Sawalich (R) | Joe Gibbs Racing | Toyota | 15.086 | 127.191 |
| 2 | 20 | Jesse Love | Venturini Motorsports | Toyota | 15.231 | 125.980 |
| 3 | 97 | Landen Lewis | CR7 Motorsports | Chevrolet | 15.231 | 125.980 |
| 4 | 28 | Luke Fenhaus (R) | Pinnacle Racing Group | Chevrolet | 15.268 | 125.675 |
| 5 | 25 | Conner Jones | Venturini Motorsports | Toyota | 15.338 | 125.101 |
| 6 | 1 | Jake Finch | Phoenix Racing | Toyota | 15.353 | 124.979 |
| 7 | 17 | Kaden Honeycutt | McGowan Motorsports | Toyota | 15.368 | 124.857 |
| 8 | 51 | Jack Wood | Rev Racing | Chevrolet | 15.404 | 124.565 |
| 9 | 2 | Andrés Pérez de Lara (R) | Rev Racing | Chevrolet | 15.468 | 124.050 |
| 10 | 15 | Sean Hingorani (R) | Venturini Motorsports | Toyota | 15.488 | 123.889 |
| 11 | 6 | Lavar Scott (R) | Rev Racing | Chevrolet | 15.507 | 123.738 |
| 12 | 35 | Greg Van Alst | Greg Van Alst Motorsports | Ford | 15.509 | 123.722 |
| 13 | 32 | Christian Rose (R) | AM Racing | Ford | 15.599 | 123.008 |
| 14 | 3 | Landon Pembelton | Mullins Racing | Ford | 15.687 | 122.318 |
| 15 | 42 | Matt Gould | Cook Racing Technologies | Chevrolet | 15.698 | 122.232 |
| 16 | 73 | Andy Jankowiak | KLAS Motorsports | Toyota | 15.790 | 121.520 |
| 17 | 95 | Tanner Arms | MAN Motorsports | Toyota | 16.064 | 119.447 |
| 18 | 11 | Zachary Tinkle | Fast Track Racing | Toyota | 16.090 | 119.254 |
| 19 | 93 | Caleb Costner | Costner Weaver Motorsports | Chevrolet | 16.257 | 118.029 |
| 20 | 66 | Jon Garrett (R) | Veer Motorsports | Chevrolet | 16.518 | 116.164 |
| 21 | 12 | Ryan Roulette | Fast Track Racing | Ford | 16.548 | 115.954 |
| 22 | 55 | Toni Breidinger | Venturini Motorsports | Toyota | 16.789 | 114.289 |
| 23 | 01 | Tim Monroe | Fast Track Racing | Toyota | 17.048 | 112.553 |
| 24 | 10 | Ed Pompa | Fast Track Racing | Toyota | 17.736 | 108.187 |
| 25 | 98 | Dale Shearer | Shearer Speed Racing | Toyota | 18.092 | 106.058 |
| 26 | 48 | Brad Smith | Brad Smith Motorsports | Chevrolet | 18.153 | 105.702 |
| 27 | 03 | Alex Clubb | Clubb Racing Inc. | Ford | 18.235 | 105.226 |
| 28 | 69 | Mike Basham | Kimmel Racing | Ford | 18.867 | 101.701 |
| 29 | 06 | A. J. Moyer (R) | Wayne Peterson Racing | Ford | 19.281 | 99.518 |
| 30 | 30 | Frankie Muniz (R) | Rette Jones Racing | Ford | – | – |
| 31 | 31 | Rita Goulet (R) | Rise Motorsports | Chevrolet | – | – |
| 32 | 87 | Charles Buchanan | Charles Buchanan Racing | Ford | – | – |
Official qualifying results

== Race results ==
| Fin | St | # | Driver | Team | Make | Laps | Led | Status | Pts |
|---|---|---|---|---|---|---|---|---|---|
| 1 | 1 | 18 | William Sawalich (R) | Joe Gibbs Racing | Toyota | 200 | 10 | Running | 48 |
| 2 | 3 | 20 | Jesse Love | Venturini Motorsports | Toyota | 200 | 158 | Running | 44 |
| 3 | 9 | 2 | Andrés Pérez de Lara (R) | Rev Racing | Chevrolet | 200 | 0 | Running | 41 |
| 4 | 6 | 1 | Jake Finch | Phoenix Racing | Toyota | 200 | 0 | Running | 40 |
| 5 | 12 | 35 | Greg Van Alst | Greg Van Alst Motorsports | Ford | 200 | 0 | Running | 39 |
| 6 | 5 | 25 | Conner Jones | Venturini Motorsports | Toyota | 200 | 0 | Running | 38 |
| 7 | 14 | 3 | Landon Pembelton | Mullins Racing | Ford | 200 | 0 | Running | 37 |
| 8 | 13 | 32 | Christian Rose (R) | AM Racing | Ford | 200 | 0 | Running | 36 |
| 9 | 8 | 51 | Jack Wood | Rev Racing | Chevrolet | 200 | 0 | Running | 35 |
| 10 | 16 | 73 | Andy Jankowiak | KLAS Motorsports | Toyota | 200 | 0 | Running | 34 |
| 11 | 17 | 95 | Tanner Arms | MAN Motorsports | Toyota | 200 | 0 | Running | 33 |
| 12 | 22 | 55 | Toni Breidinger | Venturini Motorsports | Toyota | 199 | 0 | Running | 32 |
| 13 | 18 | 11 | Zachary Tinkle | Fast Track Racing | Toyota | 198 | 0 | Running | 31 |
| 14 | 19 | 93 | Caleb Costner | Costner Weaver Motorsports | Chevrolet | 198 | 0 | Running | 30 |
| 15 | 10 | 15 | Sean Hingorani (R) | Venturini Motorsports | Toyota | 196 | 0 | Running | 29 |
| 16 | 24 | 10 | Ed Pompa | Fast Track Racing | Toyota | 192 | 0 | Running | 28 |
| 17 | 11 | 6 | Lavar Scott (R) | Rev Racing | Chevrolet | 189 | 0 | Running | 27 |
| 18 | 21 | 12 | Ryan Roulette | Fast Track Racing | Ford | 189 | 0 | Running | 26 |
| 19 | 32 | 87 | Charles Buchanan | Charles Buchanan Racing | Ford | 186 | 0 | Running | 25 |
| 20 | 2 | 97 | Landen Lewis | CR7 Motorsports | Chevrolet | 182 | 32 | Accident | 25 |
| 21 | 7 | 17 | Kaden Honeycutt | McGowan Motorsports | Toyota | 110 | 0 | Accident | 23 |
| 22 | 14 | 03 | Alex Clubb | Clubb Racing Inc. | Ford | 104 | 0 | Running | 22 |
| 23 | 30 | 30 | Frankie Muniz (R) | Rette Jones Racing | Ford | 89 | 0 | Accident | 21 |
| 24 | 25 | 98 | Dale Shearer | Shearer Speed Racing | Toyota | 54 | 0 | Too Slow | 20 |
| 25 | 23 | 01 | Tim Monroe | Fast Track Racing | Toyota | 54 | 0 | Accident | 19 |
| 26 | 20 | 66 | Jon Garrett (R) | Veer Motorsports | Chevrolet | 52 | 0 | Mechanical | 18 |
| 27 | 29 | 06 | A. J. Moyer (R) | Wayne Peterson Racing | Ford | 52 | 0 | Too Slow | 17 |
| 28 | 31 | 31 | Tim Goulet | Rise Motorsports | Chevrolet | 43 | 0 | Accident | 16 |
| 29 | 4 | 28 | Luke Fenhaus (R) | Pinnacle Racing Group | Chevrolet | 30 | 0 | Accident | 15 |
| 30 | 26 | 48 | Brad Smith | Brad Smith Motorsports | Chevrolet | 24 | 0 | Stalled | 14 |
| 31 | 15 | 42 | Matt Gould | Cook Racing Technologies | Chevrolet | 12 | 0 | Mechanical | 13 |
| 32 | 28 | 69 | Mike Basham | Kimmel Racing | Ford | 9 | 0 | Mechanical | 12 |
Official race results

== Standings after the race ==
Drivers' Championship standings (ARCA Main)

| Pos | Driver | Points |
|---|---|---|
| 1 | Jesse Love | 913 |
| 2 | Andrés Pérez de Lara | 780 (-133) |
| 3 | Christian Rose | 759 (-154) |
| 4 | Frankie Muniz | 740 (-173) |
| 5 | Jon Garrett | 662 (-251) |
| 6 | Brad Smith | 580 (-333) |
| 7 | A. J. Moyer | 570 (-343) |
| 8 | William Sawalich | 473 (-440) |
| 9 | Toni Breidinger | 449 (-464) |
| 10 | Tim Monroe | 326 (-587) |

Drivers' Championship standings (ARCA East)

| | Pos | Driver | Points |
|---|---|---|---|
| | 1 | William Sawalich | 420 |
| | 2 | Luke Fenhaus | 362 (-58) |
| | 3 | Lavar Scott | 351 (-69) |
| | 4 | Zachary Tinkle | 336 (-84) |
| | 5 | Tim Monroe | 281 (-139) |
| | 6 | Dale Shearer | 273 (-147) |
| | 7 | Sean Hingorani | 272 (-148) |
| 2 | 8 | Jake Finch | 203 (-217) |
| 2 | 9 | Conner Jones | 187 (-233) |
| 1 | 10 | Brad Smith | 186 (-234) |

- Note: Only the first 10 positions are included for the driver standings.

| Previous race: 2023 Sioux Chief Fast Track 150 | ARCA Menards Series; 2023 season | Next race: 2023 Atlas 200 |

| Previous race: 2023 Sprecher 150 | ARCA Menards Series East; 2023 season | Next race: 2024 Pensacola 150 |
