= McGowan Motorsports =

American stock car racing team

- Owner(s): Steve McGowan; Brenn McGowan; Bruce Cook
- Base: Mooresville, North Carolina
- Series: ARCA Menards Series; ARCA Menards Series East; ARCA Menards Series West
- Race drivers: ARCA Menards Series: 17. Landen Lewis, Kaden Honeycutt; ARCA Menards Series East: 17. Landen Lewis, Kaden Honeycutt; ARCA Menards Series West: 17. Landen Lewis, Kaden Honeycutt
- Manufacturer: Toyota, Chevrolet
- Opened: 2008

Career
- Debut: NASCAR Camping World Truck Series: 2010 Smith's 350 (Las Vegas); ARCA Menards Series: 2020 General Tire 150 (Phoenix); ARCA Menards Series East: 2008 U.S. Cellular 200 (Iowa); ARCA Menards Series West: 2008 California Highway Patrol 200 (Irwindale)
- Latest race: NASCAR Camping World Truck Series: 2011 O'Reilly 200 (Bristol); ARCA Menards Series: 2023 Bush's Beans 200 (Bristol); ARCA Menards Series East: 2023 Bush's Beans 200 (Bristol); ARCA Menards Series West: 2023 51FIFTY Jr. Homecoming ARCA 150 (Madera)
- Races competed: Total: 134; NASCAR Truck Series: 6 ARCA Menards Series: 7 ARCA Menards Series East: 18; ARCA Menards Series West: 120
- Drivers' Championships: Total: 0 NASCAR Truck Series: 0 ARCA Menards Series: 0 ARCA Menards Series East: 0 ARCA Menards Series West: 0
- Race victories: Total: 0 NASCAR Truck Series: 0 ARCA Menards Series: 0 ARCA Menards Series East: 0 ARCA Menards Series West: 10
- Pole positions: Total: 14; NASCAR Truck Series: 0 ARCA Menards Series: 0 ARCA Menards Series East: 1 ARCA Menards Series West: 13

McGowan Motorsports, also known as Steve McGowan Motorsports or MMI Racing, is an American stock car racing team that competes in the ARCA Menards Series, ARCA Menards Series East, and the ARCA Menards Series West. The team was founded in 2007 by Steve and Brenn McGowan, and they currently field the No. 17 Chevrolet SS/Toyota Camry part-time for Landen Lewis and Kaden Honeycutt in the ARCA Menards Series, the No. 17 Toyota Camry part-time for Lewis and Honeycutt in the ARCA Menards Series East, and the No. 17 Chevrolet SS/Toyota Camry full-time for Lewis and Honeycutt in the ARCA Menards Series West. The team has a technical alliance with Cook Racing Technologies, in which they operate from their race shop in Mooresville, North Carolina. They previously competed in the NASCAR Camping World Truck Series and the SRL Southwest Tour.

== NASCAR Camping World Truck Series ==
=== Truck No. 19 history ===
==== David Mayhew (2010-2011) ====
In late 2010, the team would make their debut in the NASCAR Camping World Truck Series, with David Mayhew running three races in the No. 19 truck, earning their best finish of 14th at Homestead–Miami Speedway. The team's trucks were prepared by Kevin Harvick Incorporated, with McGowan serving as the operator.

They returned for the 2011 season, running three races at Phoenix, Bristol, and Las Vegas, earning a best-career finish of seventh at Las Vegas. They have not run a Truck Series race since then.

==== Truck No. 19 results ====
NASCAR Camping World Truck Series results
Year	Driver(s)	No.	Make	1	2	3	4	5	6	7	8	9	10	11	12	13	14	15	16	17	18	19	20	21	22	23	24	25	NCWTC	Pts	Ref
2010	David Mayhew	19	Chevy	DAY	ATL	MAR	NSH	KAN	DOV	CLT	TEX	MCH	IOW	GTY	IRP	POC	NSH	DAR	BRI	CHI	KEN	NHA	LVS; 15	MAR	TAL	TEX	PHO; 16	HOM; 14	61st	123	
2011	David Mayhew	19	Chevy	DAY	PHO; 29	DAR	MAR	NSH	DOV	CLT	KAN	TEX	KEN	IOW	NSH	IRP	POC	MCH	BRI; 12	ATL	CHI	NHA	KEN	LVS; 7	TAL	MAR	TEX	HOM	-	-	

== ARCA Menards Series ==
=== Car No. 17 history ===
==== Multiple drivers (2020-present) ====
Despite years of running in the ARCA Menards Series East and West, the team would make their main ARCA Menards Series debut in the 2020 General Tire 150 (which was also a collaboration race with the West Series), with Truck Series regular Zane Smith behind the wheel in their No. 17W car (DGR-Crosley used the 17 in that race). Smith finished fifth after starting in tenth. Road course ringer Will Rodgers would take over the ride for the General Tire 100 at the Daytona International Speedway Road Course, finishing fifth. Smith returned behind the wheel for the 2021 General Tire 150, finishing 28th after being involved in a late-race incident.

In 2022, Xfinity Series regular Josh Berry took over the ride for Phoenix, finishing in a respectable eighth. In 2023, Landen Lewis drove the car at Phoenix, finishing second behind eventual race-winner Tyler Reif. Kaden Honeycutt drove the car at Bristol Motor Speedway (a collaboration race with the East Series), running in the top-five for most of the race, but finishing 21st after a late-race incident.

==== Car No. 17 results ====
ARCA Menards Series results
Year	Driver(s)	No.	Make	1	2	3	4	5	6	7	8	9	10	11	12	13	14	15	16	17	18	19	20	AMSC	Pts	Ref
2020	Zane Smith	17W	Chevy	DAY	PHO; 5	TAL	POC	IRP	KEN	IOW	KAN	TOL	TOL	MCH										32nd	79	
2020	Will Rodgers	17W	Chevy												DAY; 5	GTW	I44	TOL	BRI	WIN	MEM	ISF	KAN	32nd	79	
2021	Zane Smith	17W	Chevy	DAY	PHO; 28	TAL	KAN	TOL	CLT	MOH	POC	ELK	BLN	IOW	WIN	GLN	MCH	ISF	MLW	DSF	BRI	SLM	KAN	68th	16	
2022	Josh Berry	17W	Chevy	DAY	PHO; 8	TAL	KAN	CLT	IOW	BLN	ELK	MOH	POC	IRP	MCH	GLN	ISF	MLW	DSF	KAN	BRI	SLM	TOL	42nd	62	
2023	Landen Lewis	17	Toyota	DAY	PHO; 2	TAL	KAN	CLT	BLN	ELK	MOH	IOW	POC	MCH	IRP	GLN	ISF	MLW	DSF	KAN				42nd	66	
2023	Kaden Honeycutt	17	Toyota																		BRI; 21	SLM	TOL	42nd	66	

== ARCA Menards Series East ==
=== Car No. 17 history ===
==== Landen Lewis/Kaden Honeycutt (2023) ====
The 17 team would make their ARCA Menards Series East in 2023, with Landen Lewis driving the car at Dover Motor Speedway, he finished second in a close finish with race winner Jake Finch. Kaden Honeycutt drove the car at Bristol Motor Speedway (which was a combo race with the main series), finishing 21st following a late-race incident. The team ran unbadged Toyota's for both entries.

==== Car No. 17 results ====
ARCA Menards Series East results
Year	Driver(s)	No.	Make	1	2	3	4	5	6	7	8	AMSEC	Pts	Ref
2023	Landen Lewis	17	Toyota	FIF	DOV; 2	NSV	FRS	IOW	IRP	MLW		25th	66	
2023	Kaden Honeycutt	17	Toyota								BRI; 21	25th	66	

=== Car No. 19 history ===
==== David Mayhew (2009) ====
Mayhew would run two races in a separate entry at New Hampshire and Dover, running the No. 19 car. He earned a best finish of fourth at Dover.

NASCAR K&N Pro Series East results
Year	Driver(s)	No.	Make	1	2	3	4	5	6	7	8	9	10	11	NKNPSEC	Pts	Ref
2009	David Mayhew	19	Chevy	GRE	TRI	IOW	SBO	GLN	NHA	TMP	ADI	LRP	NHA; 27	DOV; 4	-	-	

=== Car No. 24 history ===
==== Amber Slagle (2022) ====
In 2022, the team would field the No. 24 car at the Milwaukee Mile for Amber Slagle. The entry was fielded in a collaboration with Cook Racing Technologies. Slagle started 28th after not posting a qualifying lap, she finished 18th in the race.

==== Car No. 24 results ====
ARCA Menards Series East results
Year	Driver(s)	No.	Make	1	2	3	4	5	6	7	AMSWC	Pts	Ref
2022	Amber Slagle	24	Chevy	NSM	FIF	DOV	NSV	IOW	MLW; 18	BRI	36th	26	

=== Car No. 77 history ===
==== David Mayhew (2012) ====
David Mayhew would drive this car at Bristol Motor Speedway in 2012, as the 17 was being used by another team. Mayhew finished 11th in the race after starting 14th.

==== Car No. 77 results ====
NASCAR K&N Pro Series East results
Year	Driver(s)	No.	Make	1	2	3	4	5	6	7	8	9	10	11	12	13	14	NKNPSEC	Pts	Ref
2012	David Mayhew	77	Chevy	BRI; 11	GRE	RCH	IOW	BGS	JFC	LGY	CNB	COL	IOW	NHA	DOV	GRE	CAR	-	-	

== ARCA Menards Series West ==
=== Car No. 17 history ===
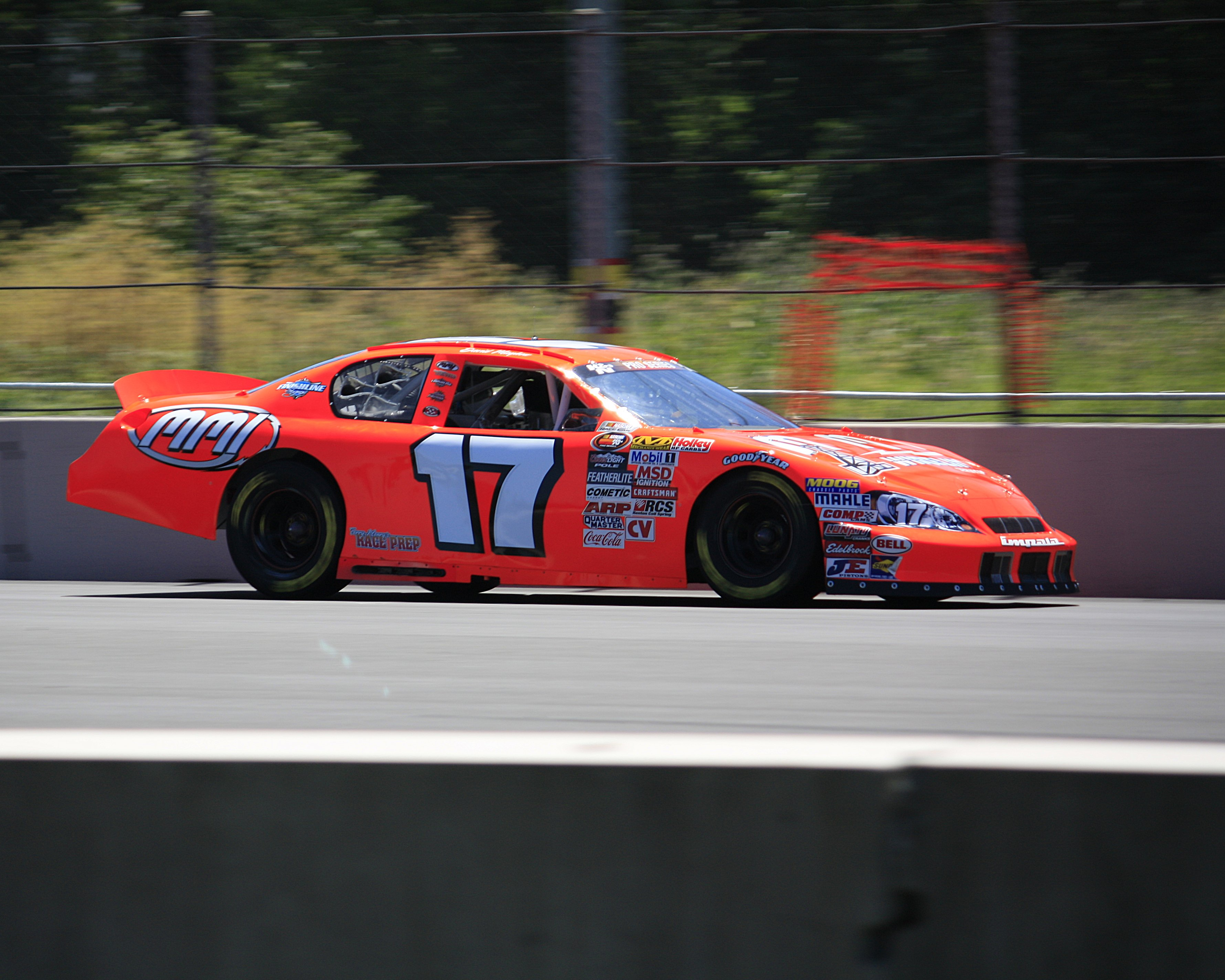
David Mayhew in the 17 car at Portland International Raceway in 2011.

==== David Mayhew (2009-2019) ====
In 2009, David Mayhew would contest a full season in the Camping World West Series in the 17 car, although he skipped the season finale. He earned three poles, six top fives, eight top tens, and scored two wins at Iowa Speedway, finishing sixth in the standings.

He returned for the 2010 season, earning three poles and winning one race at Iowa, finishing a career-best second in points.

2011 saw him scale to a part-time schedule, running nine races and finishing 14th in points. He returned full-time in 2012, and despite winning one race in the season-opener at Phoenix, he was consistent and finished top-ten in all races that year, getting fifth in standings.

He had a breakout season in 2014, earning four wins at Stockton 99 Speedway, Iowa, Evergreen, and Miller Motorsports Park, and ranking fifth in the standings.

He scored wins at Sonoma and Evergeen in the 2015 season and finished 6th in standings. He would scale to a partial for the next few years, earning a best finish of third at Sonoma in 2017. He ran his last race for the team in 2019, finishing fifth at the same track.

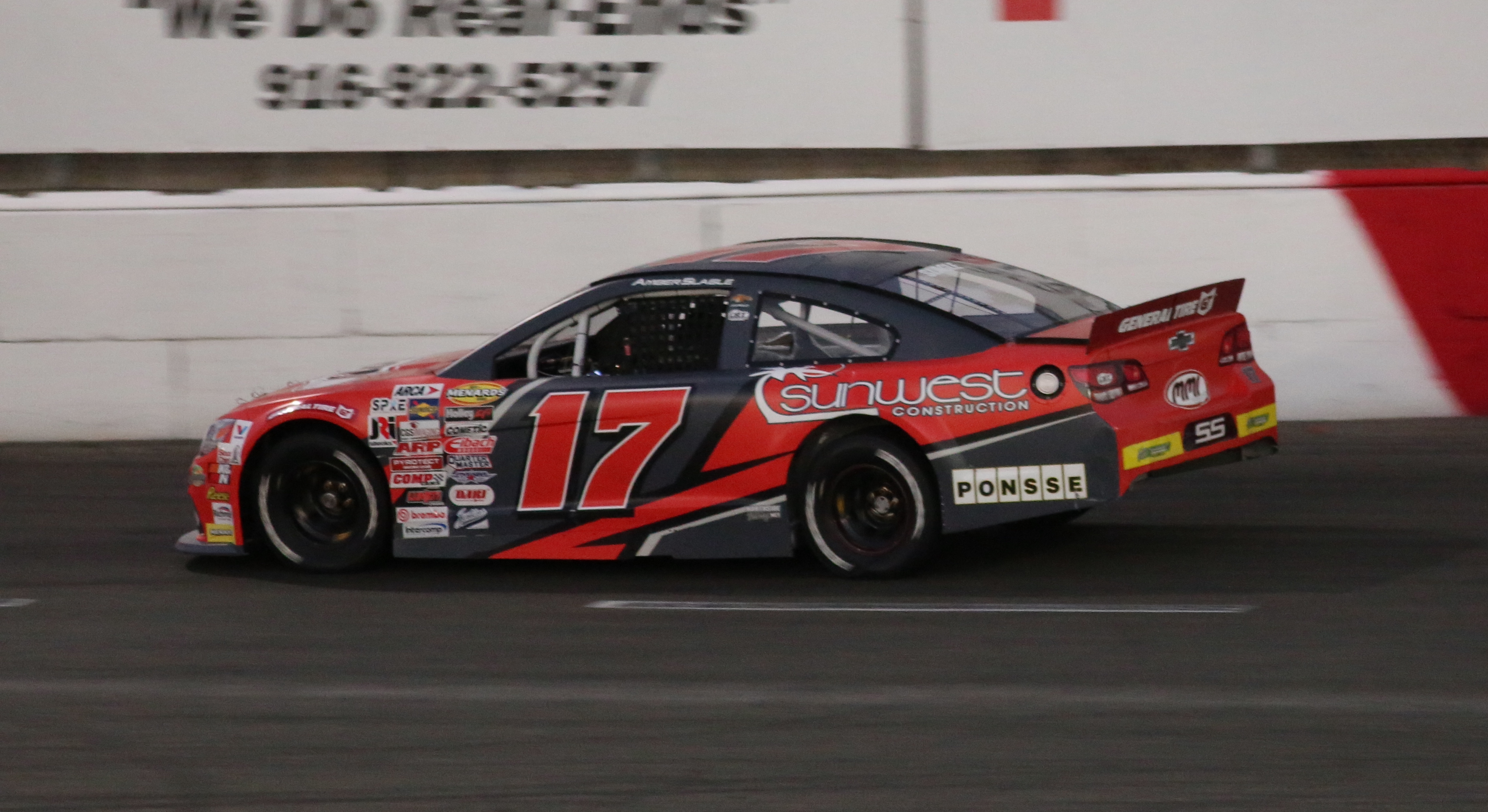
Amber Slagle in the 17 car at the All American Speedway in 2021.

==== Multiple drivers (2019-present) ====
The team would hire longtime veteran Tony Toste to drive the 17 car in the 2019 Star Nursery 100, finishing 16th in the race. Xfinity Series driver Zane Smith would take over the ride for the season finale at Phoenix, finishing 21st. Smith, who moved to the Truck Series in 2020 to drive for GMS Racing, returned for the season finale at Phoenix in 2020, finishing in the top five. He ran the season-opener in 2021, finishing 28th after being involved in a late-race incident.

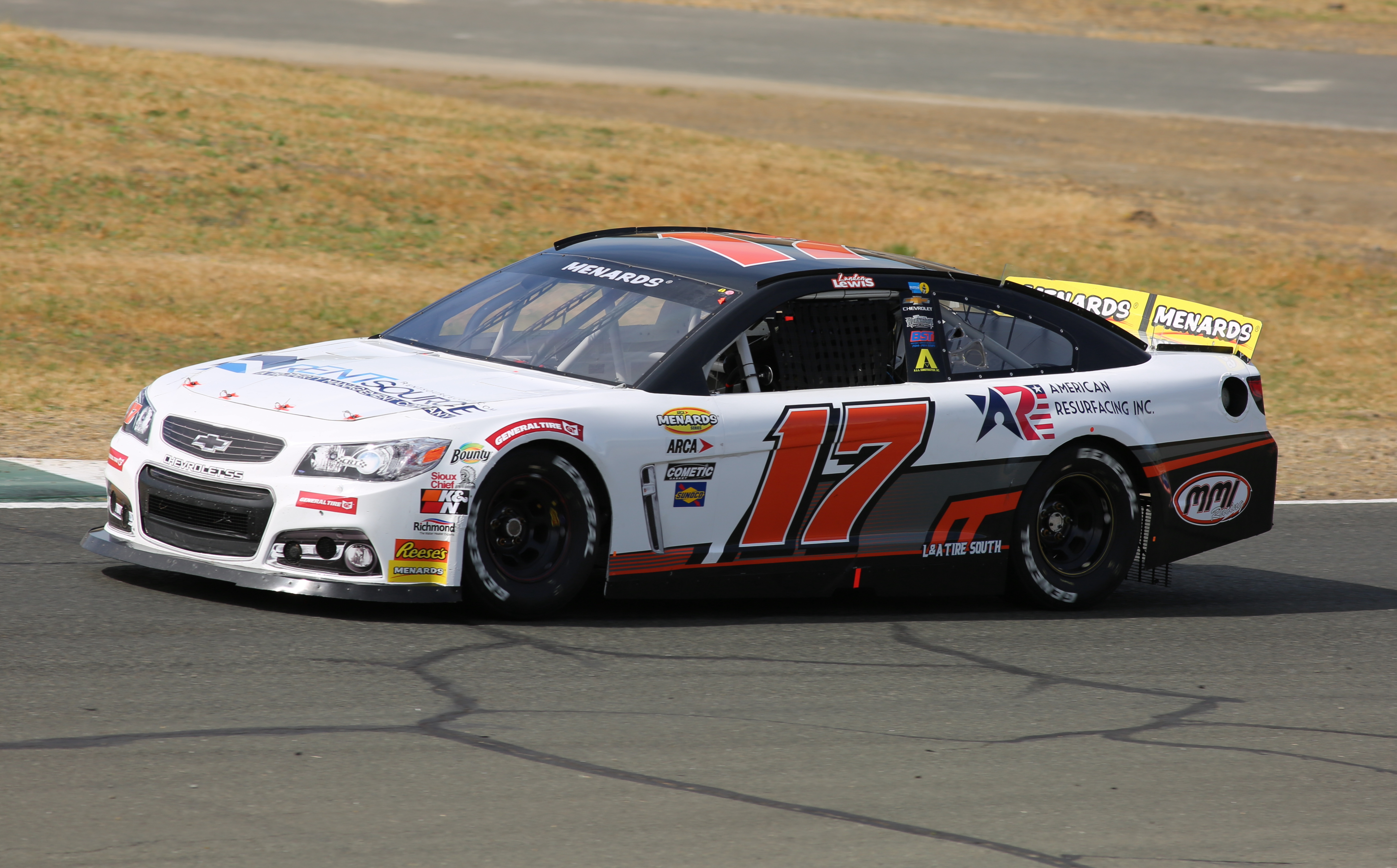
Landen Lewis in the 17 car at Sonoma Raceway in 2023.

On June 7, 2021, it was announced that late model racer Amber Slagle would make her West Series debut for the team at Irwindale Speedway early in the year. Slagle worked as a crew chief and mechanic for Cook Racing Technologies, which is how the deal came together. She surprised with a fourth-place qualifying effort, but would ultimately finish 14th in the race. She ran two more races for the team that season, earning her best-career finish of 10th at the All American Speedway. 15-year old Conner Jones would drive the car at the season finale in Phoenix, finishing 19th after starting 18th.

The team increased their schedule to seven races in 2022, with Josh Berry driving at Phoenix, Slagle returning for Kern County and Irwindale, Connor Mosack at Portland, Landen Lewis at Sonoma, and Buddy Shepherd at The Bullring and Phoenix in November. Although they went winless, they earned a best finish of 2nd, with Mosack behind the wheel.

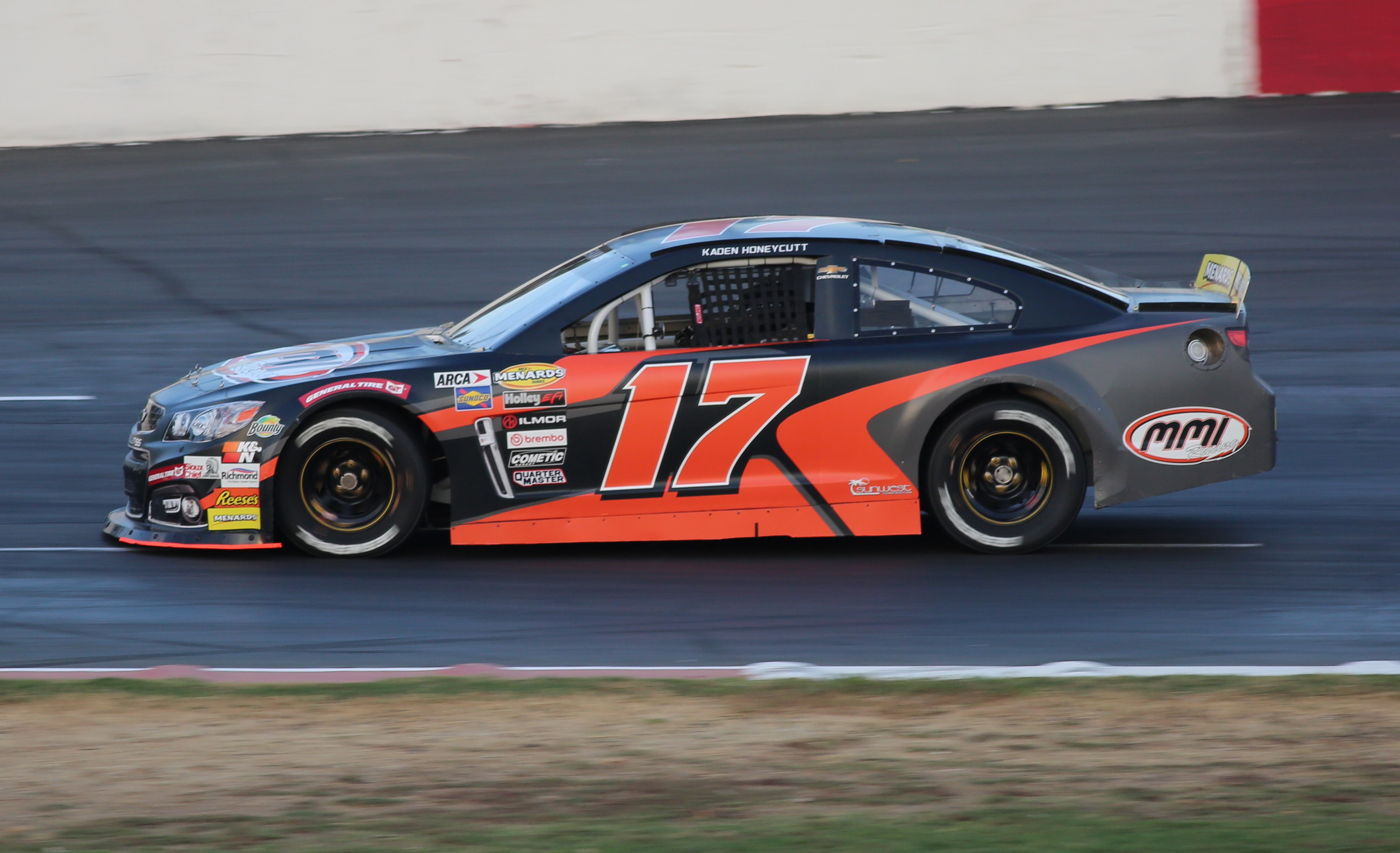
Kaden Honeycutt in the 17 car at Madera Speedway in 2023.

In 2023, Lewis was promoted to a full-time schedule with the team. After three consecutive races of finishing second, he broke through with a win at Portland International Raceway, holding off Xfinity Series regular Cole Custer in the final laps. Following the race at Evergreen, Lewis departed from the team to seek new opportunities. Truck Series driver Kaden Honeycutt would pilot the car for the rest of the season, earning two wins at Roseville and Madera. Honeycutt finished 9th at Phoenix and gave the team their first owner's championship.

==== Car No. 17 results ====
ARCA Menards Series West results
Year	Driver(s)	No.	Make	1	2	3	4	5	6	7	8	9	10	11	12	13	14	15	AMSWC	Pts	Ref
2009	David Mayhew	17	Chevy	CTS; 6	AAS; 4	PHO; 14	MAD; 2	IOW; 1	DCS; 3	SON; 2	IRW; 7	PIR; 15	MMP; 23	CNS; 16	IOW; 1*	AAS			-	-	
2010	David Mayhew	17	Chevy	AAS; 4	PHO; 5	IOW; 1*	DCS; 2	SON; 23	IRW; 23	PIR; 4	MRP; 2*	CNS; 5	MMP; 15	AAS; 2	PHO; 7				-	-	
2011	David Mayhew	17	Chevy	PHO; 9	AAS; 10	MMP; 5	IOW; 2	LVS; 23	SON; 24	IRW; 8	EVG	PIR; 12	CNS	MRP	SPO	AAS	PHO; 10		-	-	
2012	David Mayhew	17	Chevy	PHO; 1	LHC; 2	MMP; 9	S99; 3	IOW; 10	BIR; 5	LVS; 4	SON; 9	EVG; 5	CNS; 8	IOW; 4	PIR; 6	SMP	AAS; 3	PHO; 7	-	-	
2013	David Mayhew	17	Chevy	PHO; 25	S99	BIR	IOW	L44	SON; 4	CNS	IOW; 11	EVG	SPO	MMP	SMP	AAS	KCR; 4	PHO; 4	-	-	
2014	David Mayhew	17	Chevy	PHO; 24	IRW; 2	S99; 1*	IOW; 1	KCR; 3	SON; 21	SLS; 5*	CNS; 14	IOW; 2	EVG; 1	KCR; 10	MMP; 1	AAS; 5	PHO; 6		-	-	
2015	David Mayhew	17	Chevy	KCR; 2	IRW; 6	TUS; 14	IOW; 4	SHA; 20*	SON; 1	SLS; 10	IOW; 15	EVG; 1*	CNS; 4	MER; 21	AAS; 4	PHO; 29			-	-	
2016	David Mayhew	17	Chevy	IRW	KCR; 6	TUS	OSS	CNS	SON; 30	SLS	IOW	EVG	DCS	MMP	MMP	MER	AAS		-	-	
2017	David Mayhew	17	Chevy	TUS	KCR; 5	IRW	IRW	SPO	OSS	CNS	SON; 3	IOW	EVG	DCS	MER	AAS	KCR		-	-	
2018	David Mayhew	17	Chevy	KCR; 12	TUS	TUS	OSS	CNS	SON; 11	DCS	IOW	EVG	GTW	LVS	MER	AAS	KCR; 4		22nd	105	
2019	Tony Toste	17	Chevy	LVS; 16															24th	90	
2019	David Mayhew	17	Chevy		IRW	TUS	TUS	CNS	SON; 5	DCS	IOW	EVG	GTW	MER	AAS	KCR			24th	90	
2019	Zane Smith	17	Chevy														PHO; 21		24th	90	
2020	Zane Smith	17	Chevy	LVS	MMP	MMP	IRW	EVG	DCS	CNS	LVS	AAS	KCR	PHO; 26					30th	68	
2021	Zane Smith	17	Chevy	PHO; 28	SON; 21														18th	151	
2021	Amber Slagle	17	Chevy			IRW; 14	CNS	IRW	PIR	LVS; 21	AAS; 10								18th	151	
2021	Conner Jones	17W	Chevy									PHO; 19							18th	151	
2022	Josh Berry	17W	Chevy	PHO; 8	IRW														10th	301	
2022	Amber Slagle	17	Chevy			KCR; 10			IRW; 9	EVG	PIR	AAS							10th	301	
2022	Connor Mosack	17	Chevy				PIR; 2												10th	301	
2022	Landen Lewis	17	Chevy					SON; 14											10th	301	
2022	Buddy Shepherd	17	Toyota										LVS; 5	PHO; 11					10th	301	
2023	Landen Lewis	17	Toyota	PHO; 2	IRW; 2														1st	637	
2023	Landen Lewis	17	Chevy			KCR; 2*	PIR; 1	SON; 19	IRW; 9	SHA; 4	EVG; 4								1st	637	
2023	Kaden Honeycutt	17	Chevy									AAS; 1*	LVS; 9	MAD; 1**					1st	637	
2023	Kaden Honeycutt	17	Toyota												PHO; 9				1st	637	

=== Car No. 19 history ===
Terry Henry would run four races in the No. 19 car throughout the 2008 season, earning his best finish of 10th at Irwindale. He returned for one race in 2009, finishing tenth after starting 9th at Phoenix. In 2010, Tony Toste would pilot the car for one race at Miller Motorsports Park, finishing seventh after starting 18th. Auggie Vidovich ran the season finale, finishing in fourth. Toste returned for the 2011 race at Miller, finishing 32nd due to an issue early in the race. Kyle Heckman drove two races in 2012, earning a best result of seventh at Miller. He returned for one race in 2013, finishing 35th due to an early DNF. The 19 car has not run since.

==== Car No. 19 results ====
NASCAR K&N Pro Series West results
Year	Driver(s)	No.	Make	1	2	3	4	5	6	7	8	9	10	11	12	13	14	15	NKNPSWC	Pts	Ref
2008	Terry Henry	19	Chevy	AAS	PHO	CTS	IOW; 19	CNS	SON	IRW; 10	DCS	EVG	MMP	IRW; 13	AMP; 14	AAS			-	-	
2009	Terry Henry	19	Chevy	CTS	AAS	PHO; 10	MAD	IOW	DCS	SON	IRW	PIR	MMP	CNS	IOW	AAS			-	-	
2010	Tony Toste	19	Chevy	AAS	PHO	IOW	DCS	SON	IRW	PIR	MRP	CNS	MMP; 7	AAS					-	-	
2010	Auggie Vidovich	19	Chevy												PHO; 4				-	-	
2011	Tony Toste	19	Chevy	PHO	AAS	MMP; 32	IOW	LVS	SON	IRW	EVG	PIR	CNS	MRP	SRP	AAS	PHO		-	-	
2012	Johnny White	19	Chevy	PHO	LHC; DNQ														-	-	
2012	Kyle Heckman	19	Chevy			MMP; 7	S99	IOW	BIR	LVS	SON; 29	EVG	CNS	IOW	PIR	SAN	AAS	PHO	-	-	
2013	Kyle Heckman	19	Chevy	PHO	S99	BIR	IOW	L44	SON; 35	CNS	IOW	EVG	SRP	MMP	SAN	AAS	KCR	PHO	-	-	
