= 2022 Sprecher 150 =

15th race of the 2022 ARCA Menards Series

Race details
- Race 15 of 20 of the 2022 ARCA Menards Series; Race 6 of 7 of the 2022 ARCA Menards Series East; Race 8 of 10 of the 2022 Sioux Chief Showdown
- Date: August 28, 2022
- Official name: 2nd Annual Sprecher 150
- Location: Milwaukee Mile, West Allis, Wisconsin
- Course: Permanent racing facility
- Course length: 1 miles (1.6 km)
- Distance: 150 laps, 150 mi (240 km)
- Scheduled distance: 150 laps, 150 mi (240 km)
- Average speed: 85.646 mph (137.834 km/h)

Pole position
Driver	Sammy Smith	Kyle Busch Motorsports
- Time: 29.558

Most laps led
Driver	Sammy Smith	Kyle Busch Motorsports
- Laps: 122

Winner
No. 18	Sammy Smith	Kyle Busch Motorsports

Television in the United States
- Network: MAVTV
- Announcers: Krista Voda, Jim Tretow

Radio in the United States
- Radio: ARCA Racing Network

The 2022 Sprecher 150 was the 15th stock car race of the 2022 ARCA Menards Series season, the 6th race of the 2022 ARCA Menards Series East season, the 8th race of the 2022 Sioux Chief Showdown, and the 2nd iteration of the event. The race was held on Sunday, August 28, 2022, in West Allis, Wisconsin at The Milwaukee Mile, a 1 mile (1.6 km) permanent oval-shaped short track. The race took the scheduled 150 laps to complete. Sammy Smith, driving for Kyle Busch Motorsports, put on a dominating performance, leading 122 laps for his third career ARCA Menards Series win, his seventh career ARCA Menards Series East win, along with his third and fourth of the seasons. To fill out the podium, Taylor Gray, driving for David Gilliland Racing, and Daniel Dye, driving for GMS Racing, would finish 2nd and 3rd, respectively.

Six female drivers competed in this race: Toni Breidinger, Amber Balcaen, Rita Thomason, Amber Slagle, Stephanie Moyer, and Mandy Chick, which is tied for the most female drivers competing in a single ARCA Menards Series race.

This was also the 400th ARCA start for veteran Brad Smith.

== Entry list ==
- (R) denotes rookie driver

#	Driver	Team	Make	Sponsor
0	Nate Moeller	Wayne Peterson Racing	Toyota	GreatRailing.com
01	Stephanie Moyer	Fast Track Racing	Toyota	EvergreenRacewayPark.com
1	Jake Finch	Phoenix Racing	Toyota	Phoenix Construction
02	Leland Honeyman (R)	Young's Motorsports	Chevrolet	Spiroflow
2	Nick Sanchez	Rev Racing	Chevrolet	Gainbridge, Max Siegel Inc.
03	Alex Clubb	Clubb Racing Inc.	Ford	Clubb Racing Inc.
06	Tim Richmond	Richmond Motorsports	Chevrolet	Immigration Law Center
6	Rajah Caruth (R)	Rev Racing	Chevrolet	Max Siegel Inc., Gainbridge
7	Eric Caudell	CCM Racing	Chevrolet	Coble Enterprises, Red Tide Canopies
10	Tim Monroe	Fast Track Racing	Toyota	Fast Track Racing
11	Bryce Haugeberg	Fast Track Racing	Toyota	Magnum Contracting
12	Zachary Tinkle	Fast Track Racing	Ford	Racing for Rescues
15	Landon Pembelton	Venturini Motorsports	Toyota	Mobil 1
17	Taylor Gray	David Gilliland Racing	Ford	Ford Performance
18	Sammy Smith (R)	Kyle Busch Motorsports	Toyota	Allstate Peterbilt Group
20	Jesse Love (R)	Venturini Motorsports	Toyota	Yahoo!
24	Amber Slagle	McGowan Motorsports	Chevrolet	Sunwest Construction, MMI Services
25	Toni Breidinger (R)	Venturini Motorsports	Toyota	Venturini Motorsports
30	Amber Balcaen (R)	Rette Jones Racing	Ford	ICON Direct
31	Rita Thomason	Tim Goulet Enterprises	Chevrolet	Kid's Cander Foundation
35	Greg Van Alst	Greg Van Alst Motorsports	Ford	CB Fabricating
40	Matt Gould	Niece Motorsports	Chevrolet	Worldwide Express
42	Christian Rose	Cook Racing Technologies	Toyota	West Virginia Tourism #AlmostHeaven
43	Daniel Dye (R)	GMS Racing	Chevrolet	BecomeADeputy.com
44	Mike Goudie	Ferrier-McClure Racing	Toyota	Ferrier-McClure Racing
48	Brad Smith	Brad Smith Motorsports	Chevrolet	PSST...Copraya Websites
74	Mandy Chick	Team Chick Motorsports	Toyota	Dynamic Drivelines, JRC Tax
Official entry list

== Practice ==
The only 45-minute practice session was held on Sunday, August 28, at 10:00 AM CST. Jesse Love, driving for Venturini Motorsports, was the fastest in the session, with a lap of 29.698, and an average speed of 121.220 mph (195.085 km/h).

Pos.	#	Driver	Team	Make	Time	Speed
1	20	Jesse Love (R)	Venturini Motorsports	Toyota	29.698	121.220
2	6	Rajah Caruth (R)	Rev Racing	Chevrolet	30.027	119.892
3	18	Sammy Smith	Kyle Busch Motorsports	Toyota	30.038	119.848
Full practice results

== Qualifying ==
Qualifying was held on Sunday, August 28, at 11:30 AM CST. The qualifying system used is a multiple-car, multiple-lap system with only one round. Whoever sets the fastest time in the round wins the pole. Sammy Smith, driving for Kyle Busch Motorsports, scored the pole for the race, with a lap of 29.558, and an average speed of 121.794 mph (196.008 km/h).

Pos.	#	Name	Team	Make	Time	Speed
1	18	Sammy Smith (R)	Kyle Busch Motorsports	Toyota	29.558	121.794
2	17	Taylor Gray	David Gilliland Racing	Ford	29.728	121.098
3	20	Jesse Love (R)	Venturini Motorsports	Toyota	29.925	120.301
4	15	Landon Pembelton	Venturini Motorsports	Toyota	29.927	120.293
5	43	Daniel Dye (R)	GMS Racing	Chevrolet	29.941	120.236
6	6	Rajah Caruth (R)	Rev Racing	Chevrolet	30.055	119.780
7	1	Jake Finch	Phoenix Racing	Toyota	30.071	119.717
8	2	Nick Sanchez	Rev Racing	Chevrolet	30.082	119.673
9	02	Leland Honeyman (R)	Young's Motorsports	Chevrolet	30.299	118.816
10	25	Toni Breidinger (R)	Venturini Motorsports	Toyota	30.384	118.483
11	42	Christian Rose	Cook Racing Technologies	Toyota	30.461	118.184
12	40	Matt Gould	Niece Motorsports	Chevrolet	30.607	117.620
13	35	Greg Van Alst	Greg Van Alst Motorsports	Ford	30.621	117.566
14	74	Mandy Chick	Team Chick Motorsports	Toyota	30.921	116.426
15	66	Ron Vandermeir Jr.	Vanco Racing	Toyota	31.131	115.640
16	30	Amber Balcaen (R)	Rette Jones Racing	Ford	31.199	115.388
17	12	Zachary Tinkle	Fast Track Racing	Ford	31.407	114.624
18	44	Mike Goudie	Ferrier-McClure Racing	Toyota	31.497	114.297
19	11	Bryce Haugeberg	Fast Track Racing	Toyota	31.602	113.917
20	06	Tim Richmond	Richmond Motorsports	Chevrolet	31.663	113.697
21	01	Stephanie Moyer	Fast Track Racing	Toyota	32.260	111.593
22	03	Alex Clubb	Clubb Racing Inc.	Ford	32.375	111.197
23	7	Eric Caudell	CCM Racing	Chevrolet	32.936	109.303
24	10	Tim Monroe	Fast Track Racing	Toyota	33.734	106.717
25	48	Brad Smith	Brad Smith Motorsports	Chevrolet	35.243	102.148
26	31	Rita Thomason	Tim Goulet Enterprises	Chevrolet	35.841	100.444
27	0	Nate Moeller	Wayne Peterson Racing	Toyota	46.580	77.286
28	24	Amber Slagle	McGowan Motorsports	Chevrolet	-	-
Official qualifying results

== Race results ==
Fin.	St	#	Driver	Team	Make	Laps	Led	Status	Pts
1	1	18	Sammy Smith (R)	Kyle Busch Motorsports	Toyota	150	122	Running	49
2	2	17	Taylor Gray	David Gilliland Racing	Ford	150	28	Running	43
3	5	43	Daniel Dye (R)	GMS Racing	Chevrolet	150	0	Running	41
4	6	6	Rajah Caruth (R)	Rev Racing	Chevrolet	150	0	Running	40
5	8	2	Nick Sanchez	Rev Racing	Chevrolet	150	0	Running	39
6	4	15	Landon Pembelton	Venturini Motorsports	Toyota	150	0	Running	38
7	3	20	Jesse Love (R)	Venturini Motorsports	Toyota	150	0	Running	37
8	7	1	Jake Finch	Phoenix Racing	Toyota	149	0	Running	36
9	13	35	Greg Van Alst	Greg Van Alst Motorsports	Ford	149	0	Running	35
10	12	40	Matt Gould	Niece Motorsports	Chevrolet	149	0	Running	34
11	9	02	Leland Honeyman (R)	Young's Motorsports	Chevrolet	149	0	Running	33
12	10	25	Toni Breidinger (R)	Venturini Motorsports	Toyota	148	0	Running	32
13	15	66	Ron Vandermeir Jr.	Vanco Racing	Toyota	148	0	Running	31
14	16	30	Amber Balcaen (R)	Rette Jones Racing	Ford	147	0	Running	30
15	11	42	Christian Rose	Cook Racing Technologies	Toyota	147	0	Running	29
16	14	74	Mandy Chick	Team Chick Motorsports	Toyota	147	0	Running	28
17	20	06	Tim Richmond	Richmond Motorsports	Chevrolet	146	0	Running	27
18	28	24	Amber Slagle	McGowan Motorsports	Chevrolet	145	0	Running	26
19	19	11	Bryce Haugeberg	Fast Track Racing	Toyota	144	0	Running	25
20	17	12	Zachary Tinkle	Fast Track Racing	Ford	142	0	Running	24
21	25	48	Brad Smith	Brad Smith Motorsports	Chevrolet	136	0	Running	23
22	22	7	Eric Caudell	CCM Racing	Chevrolet	83	0	Engine	22
23	18	44	Mike Goudie	Ferrier-McClure Racing	Toyota	77	0	Suspension	21
24	23	01	Stephanie Moyer	Fast Track Racing	Toyota	32	0	Brakes	20
25	26	31	Rita Thomason	Tim Goulet Enterprises	Chevrolet	24	0	Engine	19
26	24	10	Tim Monroe	Fast Track Racing	Toyota	16	0	Transmission	18
27	27	0	Nate Moeller	Wayne Peterson Racing	Toyota	9	0	Transmission	17
28	21	03	Alex Clubb	Clubb Racing Inc.	Ford	2	0	Accident	16
Official race results

== Standings after the race ==
Drivers' Championship standings

	Pos	Driver	Points
	1	Nick Sanchez	731
	2	Daniel Dye	720 (-11)
	3	Rajah Caruth	715 (-16)
	4	Greg Van Alst	622 (-109)
	5	Toni Breidinger	614 (-117)
	6	Amber Balcaen	576 (-155)
	7	Sammy Smith	574 (-157)
	8	Brad Smith	516 (-215)
	9	Taylor Gray	453 (-278)
1	10	Zachary Tinkle	445 (-286)

- Note: Only the first 10 positions are included for the driver standings.

Previous race: 2022 Atlas 100	ARCA Menards Series; 2022 season	Next race: 2022 Rust-Oleum Automotive Finishes 100

Previous race: 2022 Calypso Lemonade 150	ARCA Menards Series East; 2022 season	Next race: 2022 Bush's Beans 200
