= Amber Slagle =

American racing driver (born 1996)

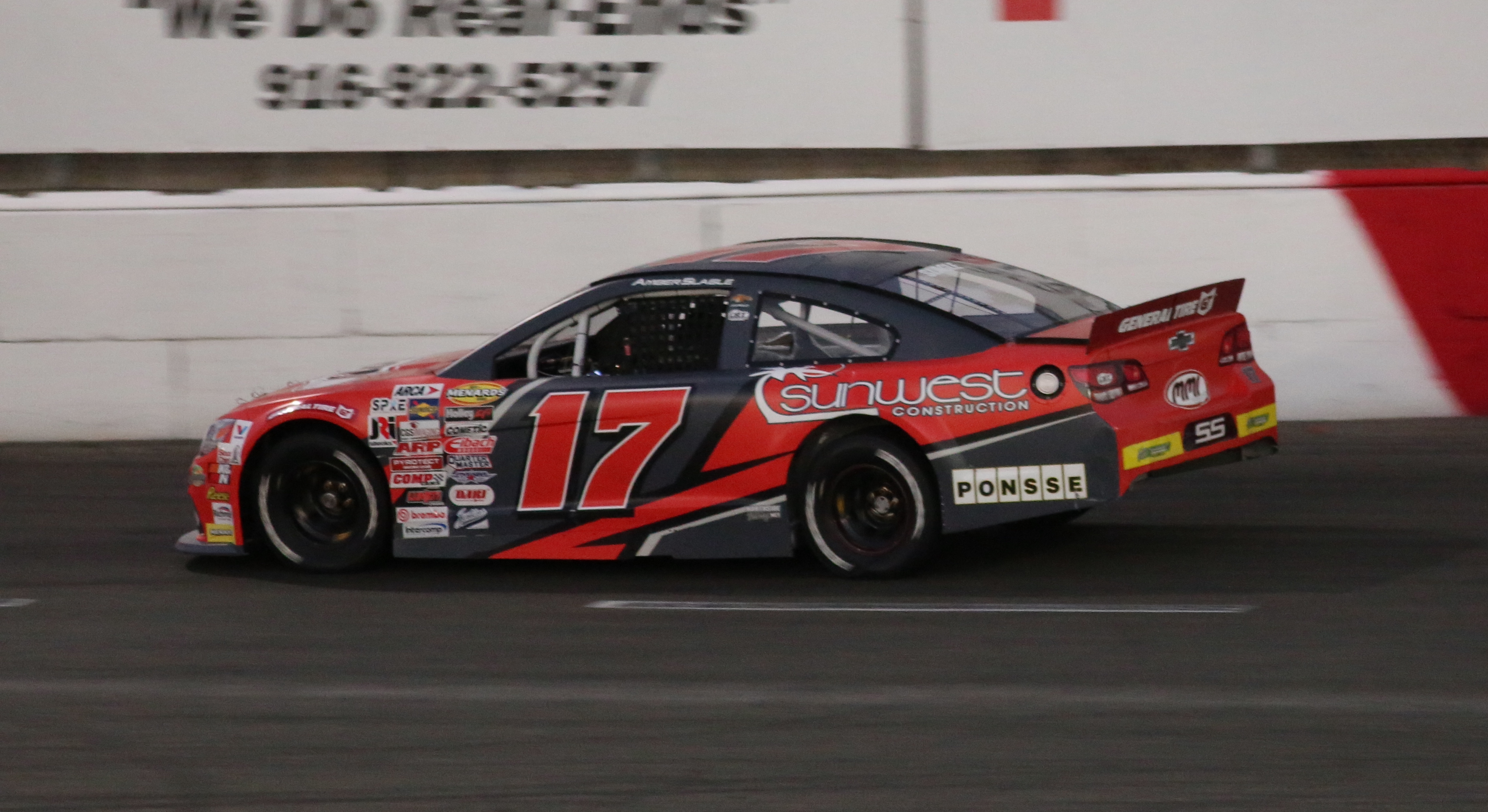
- Slagle at the All American Speedway in 2021
- Born: Amber Slagle; July 5, 1996 (age 30); Waterford, Michigan, U.S.

ARCA Menards Series career
- 1 race run over 1 year
- ARCA no., team: No. 24 (McGowan Motorsports)
Wins	Top tens	Poles
0	0	0

ARCA Menards Series West career
- 5 races run over 2 years
- ARCA West no., team: No. 17 (McGowan Motorsports)
- Best finish: 23rd (2021)
- First race: 2021 NAPA Auto Parts 150 (Irwindale)
- Last race: 2022 NAPA Auto Parts 150 (Irwindale)
Wins	Top tens	Poles
0	3	0
- Statistics up to date as of December 9, 2021.

Amber Slagle (born July 7, 1996) is an American professional stock car racing driver, crew chief, and engineer. She last competed part-time in the ARCA Menards Series and ARCA Menards Series East, driving the No. 24 Chevrolet SS for McGowan Motorsports, and part-time in the ARCA Menards Series West, driving the No. 17 Chevrolet SS for the same team.

== Racing career ==
=== Early career ===
Slagle began racing at seven years old after her father bought her a quarter midget. She won the Dixie Motor Speedway Female Driver of the Year award three times, from 2007 to 2009, where she also won Rookie of the Year in 2007. She won the Owosso Speedway track championship in 2011, while also winning the "Got Game" award.

Slagle moved up to the Champion Racing Association in 2014, posting her best finish of 14th at Salem Speedway that year, and would get that same finish the following year at Springport Mid-Michigan Speedway. She would put her racing career on hold in 2016 after the money for the tour became more expensive.

Slagle made her return in 2017, starting 20th and finishing 16th at Owosso Speedway.

Slagle moved south in 2018, questioning if she would ever race in a late model again. She got the opportunity with Cook-Finley Racing, and would drive part-time late model races in the Southeast Limited Late Model Series, and would drive in the NASCAR Advance Auto Parts Weekly Series from 2019 to 2020.

=== Crew chief ===
In 2021, Slagle became the crew chief for Cook-Finley Racing and Parker Retzlaff in the ARCA Menards Series East. They earned one top-five, and four top-tens that season.

=== ARCA Menards Series West ===
On June 7, 2021, Slagle announced that she would make her ARCA Menards Series West debut with Steve McGowan Motorsports at Irwindale Speedway. She started fourth and would finish 14th. She made two more starts that year, posting her first career top-ten at the All American Speedway.

== Personal life ==
Slagle currently resides in Sylvan Lake, Michigan, and is currently a mechanic for Cook-Finley Racing.

== Motorsports career results ==
=== ARCA Menards Series ===
(key) (Bold – Pole position awarded by qualifying time. Italics – Pole position earned by points standings or practice time. * – Most laps led.)

ARCA Menards Series results
Year	Team	No.	Make	1	2	3	4	5	6	7	8	9	10	11	12	13	14	15	16	17	18	19	20	AMSC	Pts	Ref
2022	McGowan Motorsports	24	Chevy	DAY	PHO	TAL	KAN	CLT	IOW	BLN	ELK	MOH	POC	IRP	MCH	GLN	ISF	MLW; 18	DSF	KAN	BRI	SLM		57th	57	
2022	Cook Racing Technologies	42	Chevy																				TOL; 13	57th	57	

==== ARCA Menards Series East ====
ARCA Menards Series East results
Year	Team	No.	Make	1	2	3	4	5	6	7	AMSWC	Pts	Ref
2022	McGowan Motorsports	24	Chevy	NSM	FIF	DOV	NSV	IOW	MLW; 18	BRI	51st	26	

==== ARCA Menards Series West ====
ARCA Menards Series West results
Year	Team	No.	Make	1	2	3	4	5	6	7	8	9	10	11	AMSWC	Pts	Ref
2021	Steve McGowan Motorsports	17	Chevy	PHO	SON	IRW; 14	CNS	IRW	PIR	LVS; 21	AAS; 10	PHO			23rd	87	
2021	Steve McGowan Motorsports	17w	Chevy								AAS; Wth				23rd	87	
2022	McGowan Motorsports	17	Chevy	PHO	IRW	KCR; 10	PIR	SON	IRW; 9	EVG	PIR	AAS	LVS; 20	PHO	33rd	93	
