= 2024 Circle City 200 =

6th race of the 2024 ARCA Menards Series East

Race details
- Race 10 of 20 of the 2024 ARCA Menards Series; Race 6 of 8 of the 2024 ARCA Menards Series East
- Date: July 19, 2024
- Official name: 16th Annual Circle City 200
- Location: Lucas Oil Indianapolis Raceway Park in Brownsburg, Indiana
- Course: Permanent racing facility
- Course length: 0.686 miles (1.104 km)
- Distance: 202 laps, 139 mi (222 km)
- Scheduled distance: 200 laps, 137 mi (220 km)
- Average speed: 75.879 miles per hour (122.115 km/h)

Pole position
Driver	William Sawalich	Joe Gibbs Racing
- Time: 22.306

Most laps led
Driver	Connor Zilisch	Pinnacle Racing Group
- Laps: 89

Winner
No. 28	Connor Zilisch	Pinnacle Racing Group

Television in the United States
- Network: FS1
- Announcers: Adam Alexander, Phil Parsons, and Trevor Bayne

Radio in the United States
- Radio: MRN

The 2024 Circle City 200 was the 10th stock car race of the 2024 ARCA Menards Series season, the 6th race of the 2024 ARCA Menards Series East season, and the 16th iteration of the event. The race was held on Friday, July 19, 2024, at Lucas Oil Indianapolis Raceway Park in Brownsburg, Indiana, a 0.686 mile (1.104 km) permanent oval shaped racetrack. The race was originally scheduled to be contested over 200 laps, but was extended to 202 laps due to an overtime finish. Connor Zilisch, driving for Pinnacle Racing Group, would continue to be unstoppable in the ARCA Series, holding off the field on an overtime restart to earn his third career ARCA Menards Series win, his fourth career ARCA Menards Series East win, and his third consecutive East Series win. Zilisch also dominated the race in fashion, taking the lead late from pole-sitter William Sawalich and ended up leading a race-high 89 laps. To fill out the podium, Andrés Pérez de Lara, driving for Rev Racing, and Sawalich, driving for Joe Gibbs Racing, would finish 2nd and 3rd, respectively.

== Report ==
=== Background ===
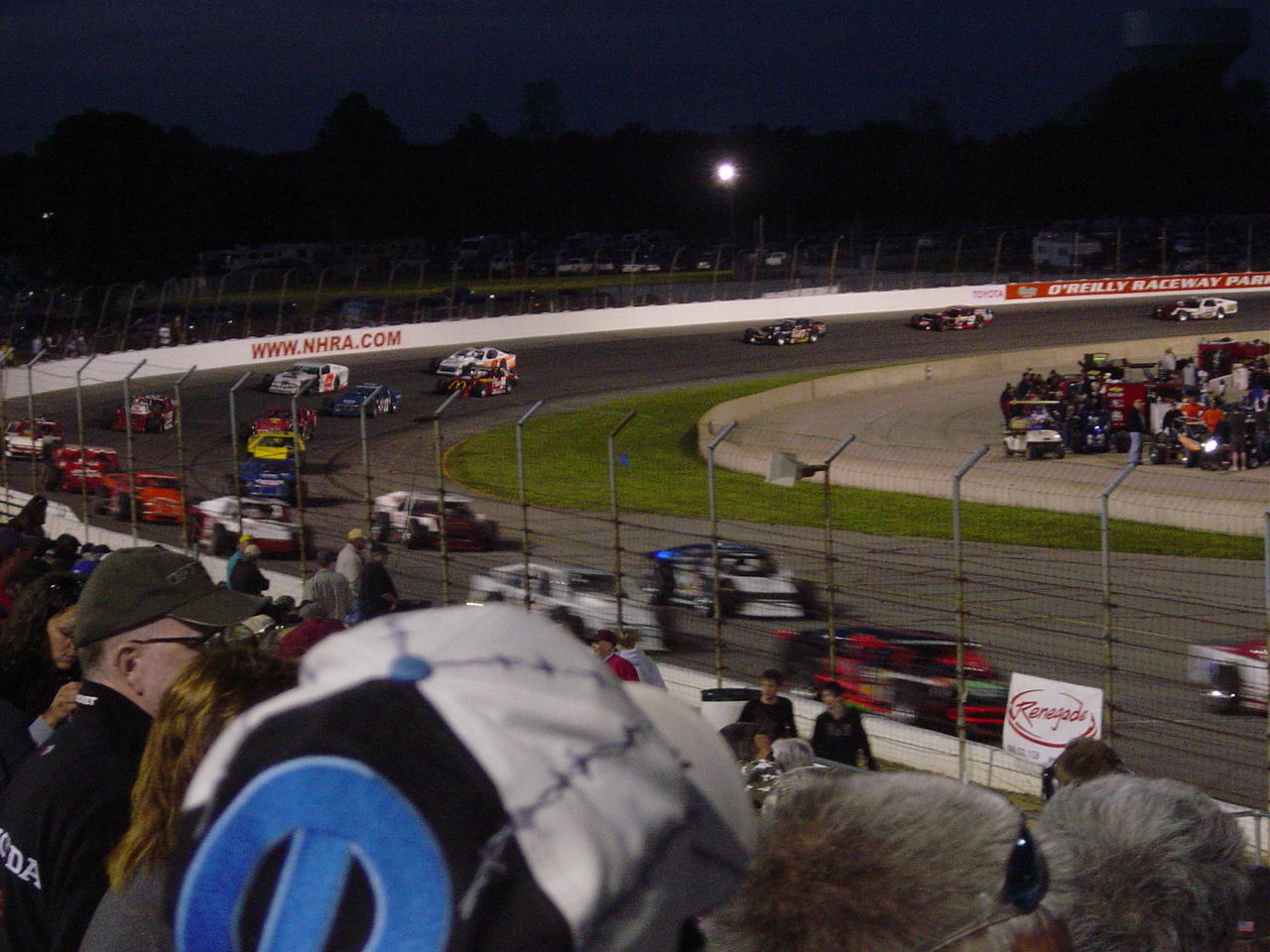
Lucas Oil Indianapolis Raceway Park, the circuit where the race was held.

Lucas Oil Indianapolis Raceway Park (formerly Indianapolis Raceway Park, O'Reilly Raceway Park at Indianapolis, and Lucas Oil Raceway) is an auto racing facility in Brownsburg, Indiana, about 10 miles (16 km) northwest of downtown Indianapolis. It includes a 0.686-mile (1.104 km) oval track, a 2.5-mile (4.0 km) road course (which has fallen into disrepair and is no longer used), and a 4,400-foot (1,300 m) drag strip which is among the premier drag racing venues in the world. The complex receives about 500,000 visitors annually.

==== Entry list ====
- (R) denotes rookie driver.

#	Driver	Team	Make	Sponsor
0	Nate Moeller	Wayne Peterson Racing	Toyota	Ocean Pipe Works
01	Cody Dennison (R)	Fast Track Racing	Toyota	Timcast
2	Andrés Pérez de Lara	Rev Racing	Chevrolet	Max Siegel Inc.
03	Alex Clubb	Clubb Racing Inc.	Ford	A. Clubb Lawn Care & Landscaping
06	Brayton Laster	Wayne Peterson Racing	Toyota	@Cyber_Fox_ on X / Bumeisters & Sons
6	Lavar Scott (R)	Rev Racing	Chevrolet	Max Siegel Inc.
10	Jayson Alexander	Fast Track Racing	Ford	Constant Contact
11	Zachary Tinkle	Fast Track Racing	Toyota	Racing for Rescues
12	Presley Sorah	Fast Track Racing	Toyota	HDFive / Tatanka Sauce
15	Kris Wright	Venturini Motorsports	Toyota	FNB Corporation
17	Marco Andretti	Cook Racing Technologies	Chevrolet	Group 1001
18	William Sawalich	Joe Gibbs Racing	Toyota	Starkey / SoundGear
20	Gio Ruggiero (R)	Venturini Motorsports	Toyota	JBL
22	Amber Balcaen	Venturini Motorsports	Toyota	ICON Direct
25	Toni Breidinger	Venturini Motorsports	Toyota	Raising Cane's Chicken Fingers
28	Connor Zilisch (R)	Pinnacle Racing Group	Chevrolet	Chevrolet / Silver Hare Development
31	Rita Goulet	Rise Motorsports	Chevrolet	NationalPolice.org
32	Christian Rose	AM Racing	Ford	West Virginia Department of Tourism
33	Lawless Alan	Reaume Brothers Racing	Ford	AutoParkIt.com
34	Isaac Johnson	Greg Van Alst Motorsports	Ford	Endress + Hauser
35	Greg Van Alst (Note: Due to Greg Van Alst being at Indianapolis Motor Speedway for Xfinity Series practice, Timmy Hill would pilot his No. 35 car during ARCA practice.)	Greg Van Alst Motorsports	Ford	Zaki Ali Personal Injury Attorney
39	D. L. Wilson	CW Motorsports	Toyota	Heart O' Texas Speedway / ETR
48	Brad Smith	Brad Smith Motorsports	Ford	Ski's Graphics
55	Dean Thompson	Venturini Motorsports	Toyota	Thompson Pipe Group
85	Becca Monopoli	City Garage Motorsports	Ford	Orlando Health
86	Casey Carden	Clubb Racing Inc.	Ford	Epic Motorsports Insurance
93	Tyler Tomassi	CW Motorsports	Ford	Tomassi Law
95	Andrew Patterson	MAN Motorsports	Toyota	Carrier / Habegger
96	Jackson McLerran	MAN Motorsports	Toyota	Firemark Property Management
98	Dale Shearer	Shearer Speed Racing	Toyota	Shearer Speed Racing
99	Michael Maples (R)	Fast Track Racing	Chevrolet	Don Ray Petroleum LLC
Official entry list

== Practice ==
The first and only practice session was held on Friday, July 19, at 1:30 PM EST, and would last for 45 minutes. William Sawalich, driving for Joe Gibbs Racing, would set the fastest time in the session, with a lap of 22.397, and a speed of 110.265 mph (177.454 km/h).

Pos.	#	Driver	Team	Make	Time	Speed
1	18	William Sawalich	Joe Gibbs Racing	Toyota	22.397	110.265
2	28	Connor Zilisch (R)	Pinnacle Racing Group	Chevrolet	22.615	109.202
3	2	Andrés Pérez de Lara	Rev Racing	Chevrolet	22.722	108.688
Full practice results

== Qualifying ==
Qualifying was held on Friday, July 19, at 2:30 PM EST. The qualifying system used is a multi-car, multi-lap system with only one round. All drivers will be on track for a 20-minute timed session, and whoever sets the fastest time in that round will win the pole.

William Sawalich, driving for Joe Gibbs Racing, would score the pole for the race, with a lap of 22.306, and a speed of 110.715 mph (178.179 km/h).

=== Qualifying results ===
Pos.	#	Driver	Team	Make	Time	Speed
1	18	William Sawalich	Joe Gibbs Racing	Toyota	22.306	110.715
2	6	Lavar Scott (R)	Rev Racing	Chevrolet	22.467	109.921
3	2	Andrés Pérez de Lara	Rev Racing	Chevrolet	22.493	109.794
4	28	Connor Zilisch (R)	Pinnacle Racing Group	Chevrolet	22.502	109.750
5	20	Gio Ruggiero (R)	Venturini Motorsports	Toyota	22.564	109.449
6	33	Lawless Alan	Reaume Brothers Racing	Ford	22.574	109.400
7	25	Toni Breidinger	Venturini Motorsports	Toyota	22.798	108.325
8	15	Kris Wright	Venturini Motorsports	Toyota	22.851	108.074
9	55	Dean Thompson	Venturini Motorsports	Toyota	22.927	107.716
10	32	Christian Rose	AM Racing	Ford	22.957	107.575
11	35	Greg Van Alst	Greg Van Alst Motorsports	Ford	22.979	107.472
12	17	Marco Andretti	Cook Racing Technologies	Chevrolet	23.067	107.062
13	95	Andrew Patterson	MAN Motorsports	Toyota	23.169	106.591
14	34	Isaac Johnson	Greg Van Alst Motorsports	Ford	23.223	106.343
15	22	Amber Balcaen	Venturini Motorsports	Toyota	23.250	106.219
16	11	Zachary Tinkle	Fast Track Racing	Toyota	23.616	104.573
17	12	Presley Sorah	Fast Track Racing	Toyota	23.757	103.953
18	39	D. L. Wilson	CW Motorsports	Toyota	23.796	103.782
19	85	Becca Monopoli	City Garage Motorsports	Ford	23.841	103.586
20	93	Tyler Tomassi	CW Motorsports	Ford	24.150	102.261
21	01	Cody Dennison (R)	Fast Track Racing	Toyota	24.170	102.176
22	99	Michael Maples (R)	Fast Track Racing	Chevrolet	24.247	101.852
23	10	Jayson Alexander	Fast Track Racing	Ford	24.508	100.767
24	06	Brayton Laster	Wayne Peterson Racing	Toyota	24.533	100.664
25	31	Rita Goulet	Rise Motorsports	Chevrolet	24.799	99.585
26	03	Alex Clubb	Clubb Racing Inc.	Ford	25.205	97.981
27	48	Brad Smith	Brad Smith Motorsports	Ford	25.968	95.102
28	86	Casey Carden	Clubb Racing Inc.	Ford	26.041	94.835
29	98	Dale Shearer	Shearer Speed Racing	Toyota	26.590	92.877
30	0	Nate Moeller	Wayne Peterson Racing	Toyota	26.884	91.861
31	96	Jackson McLerran	MAN Motorsports	Toyota	–	–
Official qualifying results

== Race results ==
Pos.	St.	#	Driver	Team	Make	Laps	Led	Status	Pts
1	4	28	Connor Zilisch (R)	Pinnacle Racing Group	Chevrolet	205	89	Running	48
2	3	2	Andrés Pérez de Lara	Rev Racing	Chevrolet	205	0	Running	92
3	1	18	William Sawalich	Joe Gibbs Racing	Toyota	205	72	Running	43
4	2	6	Lavar Scott (R)	Rev Racing	Chevrolet	205	44	Running	91
5	5	20	Gio Ruggiero (R)	Venturini Motorsports	Toyota	205	0	Running	39
6	8	15	Kris Wright	Venturini Motorsports	Toyota	205	0	Running	88
7	12	17	Marco Andretti	Cook Racing Technologies	Chevrolet	205	0	Running	37
8	11	35	Greg Van Alst	Greg Van Alst Motorsports	Ford	205	0	Running	86
9	9	55	Dean Thompson	Venturini Motorsports	Toyota	205	0	Running	35
10	14	34	Isaac Johnson	Greg Van Alst Motorsports	Ford	204	0	Running	34
11	16	11	Zackary Tinkle	Fast Track Racing	Toyota	202	0	Running	33
12	13	95	Andrew Patterson	MAN Motorsports	Toyota	202	0	Running	32
13	15	22	Amber Balcean	Venturini Motorsports	Toyota	201	0	Running	81
14	21	01	Cody Dennison (R)	Fast Track Racing	Toyota	200	0	Running	80
15	22	99	Micheal Maples (R)	Fast Track Racing	Chevrolet	199	0	Running	79
16	18	39	D. L. Wilson	CW Motorsports	Toyota	199	0	Running	28
17	20	93	Tyler Tomassi	CW Motorsports	Ford	198	0	Running	27
18	23	10	Jayson Alexander	Fast Track Racing	Ford	197	0	Running	26
19	24	06	Brayton Laster	Wayne Peterson Racing	Toyota	194	0	Running	25
20	25	31	Rita Goulet	Rise Motorsports	Chevrolet	192	0	Running	24
21	26	03	Alex Clubb	Clubb Racing Inc.	Ford	189	0	Running	73
22	10	32	Christian Rose	AM Racing	Ford	173	0	Accident	72
23	6	33	Lawless Alan	Reaume Brothers Racing	Ford	173	0	Accident	21
24	7	25	Toni Breidinger	Venturini Motorsports	Toyota	172	0	Accident	70
25	30	96	Jackson McLerran	MAN Motorsports	Toyota	166	0	Accident	19
26	31	86	Casey Carden	Clubb Racing Inc.	Ford	124	0	Mechanical	18
27	19	85	Becca Monopoli	City Garage Motorsports	Ford	121	0	Accident	17
28	28	0	Nate Moeller	Wayne Peterson Racing	Toyota	79	0	Mechanical	16
29	17	12	Presley Sorah	Fast Track Racing	Toyota	48	0	Accident	15
30	29	98	Dale Shearer	Shearer Speed Racing	Toyota	28	0	Mechanical	14
31	31	27	Brad Smith	Brad Smith Motorsports	Ford	2	0	Mechanical	63
Official race results

== Standings after the race ==
Drivers' Championship standings (ARCA Main)

	Pos	Driver	Points
	1	Andrés Pérez de Lara	481
1	2	Lavar Scott	435 (-46)
1	3	Greg Van Alst	435 (–46)
	4	Kris Wright	416 (–65)
2	5	Amber Balcaen	403 (–78)
2	6	Toni Breidinger	402 (–79)
1	7	Christian Rose	399 (–82)
	8	Michael Maples	359 (–122)
	9	Alex Clubb	344 (–137)
1	10	Cody Dennison	337 (–144)

Drivers' Championship standings (ARCA East)

	Pos	Driver	Points
	1	Connor Zilisch	326
	2	William Sawalich	303 (-23)
	3	Gio Ruggiero	288 (–38)
	4	Zachary Tinkle	256 (–70)
	5	D. L. Wilson	247 (–79)
	6	Cody Dennison	239 (–87)
	7	Michael Maples	236 (–90)
	8	Rita Goulet	210 (–116)
2	9	Toni Breidinger	125 (–201)
	10	Andrés Pérez de Lara	119 (–207)

- Note: Only the first 10 positions are included for the driver standings.

Previous race: 2024 Berlin ARCA 200	ARCA Menards Series; 2024 season	Next race: 2024 Salem ARCA 200

Previous race: 2024 Atlas 150	ARCA Menards Series East; 2024 season	Next race: 2024 Sprecher 150
