= 2023 Atlas 200 =

19th race of the 2023 ARCA Menards Series

Race details
- Race 19 of 20 of the 2023 ARCA Menards Series
- Date: September 30, 2023
- Official name: 27th Annual Atlas 200
- Location: Salem Speedway, Salem, Indiana
- Course: Permanent racing facility
- Course length: 0.555 miles (0.893 km)
- Distance: 200 laps, 111 mi (178 km)
- Scheduled distance: 200 laps, 111 mi (178 km)
- Average speed: 74.678 mph (120.183 km/h)

Pole position
Driver	Jesse Love	Venturini Motorsports
- Time: 17.106

Most laps led
Driver	Jesse Love	Venturini Motorsports
- Laps: 200

Winner
No. 20	Jesse Love	Venturini Motorsports

Television in the United States
- Network: FS2
- Announcers: Eric Brennan and Phil Parsons

Radio in the United States
- Radio: ARCA Racing Network

The 2023 Atlas 200 was the 19th stock car race of the 2023 ARCA Menards Series season, and the 26th iteration of the event. The race was held on Saturday, September 30, 2023, in Salem, Indiana at Salem Speedway, a 0.555 miles (0.893 km) permanent oval shaped racetrack. The race took the scheduled 200 laps to complete. In a wild race, Jesse Love, driving for Venturini Motorsports, would put on a blistering performance, leading every lap from the pole to earn his 12th career ARCA Menards Series win, and his tenth of the season. To fill out the podium, Andrés Pérez de Lara, driving for Rev Racing, and Christian Rose, driving for AM Racing, would finish 2nd and 3rd, respectively.

In addition to winning, Love would ultimately clinch the 2023 ARCA Menards Series championship one race early by taking the green flag.

== Background ==
Salem Speedway is a .555-mile (0.893 km) long paved oval racetrack in Washington Township, Washington County, near Salem, Indiana, United States, approximately 100 miles (160 km) south of Indianapolis. The track has 33° degrees of banking in the corners. Major auto racing series that run at Salem are ARCA and USAC.

=== Entry list ===
- (R) denotes rookie driver.

#	Driver	Team	Make	Sponsor
0	Nate Moeller	Wayne Peterson Racing	Toyota	Wayne Peterson Racing
2	Andrés Pérez de Lara (R)	Rev Racing	Chevrolet	Max Siegel Inc.
03	Alex Clubb	Clubb Racing Inc.	Ford	Clubb Racing Inc.
06	Kevin Hinckle	Wayne Peterson Racing	Ford	KH Automotive
10	Tim Monroe	Fast Track Racing	Ford	Fast Track Racing
11	Zachary Tinkle	Fast Track Racing	Toyota	Racing for Rescues
12	Ed Pompa	Fast Track Racing	Ford	HYTORC of New York, Double "H" Ranch
15	Toni Breidinger	Venturini Motorsports	Toyota	Victoria's Secret, Raising Cane's
18	William Sawalich	Joe Gibbs Racing	Toyota	Starkey, SoundGear
20	Jesse Love	Venturini Motorsports	Toyota	JBL
25	Brent Crews	Venturini Motorsports	Toyota	Yahoo!, Mobil 1
30	Frankie Muniz (R)	Rette Jones Racing	Ford	Ford Performance
31	Brayton Laster	Rise Motorsports	Chevrolet	Rise Motorsports
32	Christian Rose (R)	AM Racing	Ford	West Virginia Tourism
48	Brad Smith	Brad Smith Motorsports	Ford	Oktoberfest Race Weekend
66	Jon Garrett (R)	Veer Motorsports	Chevrolet	Fort Worth Screen Printing
68	Mike Basham	Kimmel Racing	Ford	Kimmel Racing
69	Will Kimmel	Kimmel Racing	Ford	Kimmel Racing
95	Conner Popplewell	MAN Motorsports	Toyota	Sunset Park RV Manufacturing
Official entry list

== Practice ==
The first and only practice session was held on Saturday, September 30, at 3:45 PM EST, and would last for 45 minutes. William Sawalich, driving for Joe Gibbs Racing, would set the fastest time in the session, with a lap of 17.232, and an average speed of 115.947 mph (186.599 km/h).

Pos.	#	Driver	Team	Make	Time	Speed
1	18	William Sawalich	Joe Gibbs Racing	Toyota	17.232	115.947
2	69	Will Kimmel	Kimmel Racing	Ford	17.608	113.471
3	2	Andrés Pérez de Lara (R)	Rev Racing	Chevrolet	17.672	113.060
Full practice results

== Qualifying ==
Qualifying was held on Saturday, September 30, at 5:15 PM EST. The qualifying system used is a single-car, two-lap system with only one round. Whoever sets the fastest time in that round will win the pole. Jesse Love, driving for Venturini Motorsports, would score the pole for the race, with a lap of 17.106, and an average speed of 116.801 mph (187.973 km/h).

Pos.	#	Driver	Team	Make	Time	Speed
1	20	Jesse Love	Venturini Motorsports	Toyota	17.106	116.801
2	18	William Sawalich	Joe Gibbs Racing	Toyota	17.117	116.726
3	69	Will Kimmel	Kimmel Racing	Ford	17.308	115.438
4	25	Brent Crews	Venturini Motorsports	Toyota	17.541	113.905
5	32	Christian Rose (R)	AM Racing	Ford	17.725	112.722
6	2	Andrés Pérez de Lara (R)	Rev Racing	Chevrolet	17.808	112.197
7	30	Frankie Muniz (R)	Rette Jones Racing	Ford	17.880	111.745
8	15	Toni Breidinger	Venturini Motorsports	Toyota	17.942	111.359
9	95	Conner Popplewell	MAN Motorsports	Toyota	18.029	110.821
10	11	Zachary Tinkle	Fast Track Racing	Toyota	18.094	110.423
11	66	Jon Garrett (R)	Veer Motorsports	Chevrolet	18.542	107.755
12	31	Brayton Laster	Rise Motorsports	Chevrolet	18.560	107.651
13	68	Mike Basham	Kimmel Racing	Ford	18.683	106.942
14	12	Ed Pompa	Fast Track Racing	Ford	19.123	104.482
15	48	Brad Smith	Brad Smith Motorsports	Ford	19.763	101.098
16	03	Alex Clubb	Clubb Racing Inc.	Ford	19.786	100.980
17	10	Tim Monroe	Fast Track Racing	Ford	20.275	98.545
18	06	Kevin Hinckle	Wayne Peterson Racing	Ford	20.922	95.498
19	0	Nate Moeller	Wayne Peterson Racing	Toyota	22.939	87.101
Official qualifying results

== Race results ==
Fin	St	#	Driver	Team	Make	Laps	Led	Status	Pts
1	1	20	Jesse Love	Venturini Motorsports	Toyota	200	200	Running	49
2	5	2	Andrés Pérez de Lara (R)	Rev Racing	Chevrolet	200	0	Running	42
3	4	32	Christian Rose (R)	AM Racing	Ford	200	0	Running	41
4	7	15	Toni Breidinger	Venturini Motorsports	Toyota	199	0	Running	40
5	8	95	Conner Popplewell	MAN Motorsports	Toyota	198	0	Running	39
6	2	18	William Sawalich	Joe Gibbs Racing	Toyota	195	0	Running	38
7	10	66	Jon Garrett (R)	Veer Motorsports	Chevrolet	192	0	Running	37
8	13	12	Ed Pompa	Fast Track Racing	Ford	187	0	Running	36
9	11	31	Brayton Laster	Rise Motorsports	Chevrolet	180	0	Running	35
10	6	30	Frankie Muniz (R)	Rette Jones Racing	Ford	119	0	Running	34
11	9	11	Zachary Tinkle	Fast Track Racing	Toyota	116	0	Engine	33
12	19	25	Brent Crews	Venturini Motorsports	Toyota	104	0	Running	32
13	3	69	Will Kimmel	Kimmel Racing	Ford	103	0	Suspension	31
14	17	06	Kevin Hinckle	Wayne Peterson Racing	Ford	88	0	Mechanical	30
15	15	03	Alex Clubb	Clubb Racing Inc.	Ford	45	0	Drive Train	29
16	14	48	Brad Smith	Brad Smith Motorsports	Ford	19	0	Oil Pressure	28
17	16	10	Tim Monroe	Fast Track Racing	Ford	9	0	Handling	27
18	12	68	Mike Basham	Kimmel Racing	Ford	5	0	Mechanical	26
19	18	0	Nate Moeller	Wayne Peterson Racing	Toyota	4	0	Handling	25
Official race results

== Standings after the race ==
Drivers' Championship standings

Pos	Driver	Points
1	Jesse Love	963
2	Andrés Pérez de Lara	822 (-141)
3	Christian Rose	800 (-163)
4	Frankie Muniz	774 (-189)
5	Jon Garrett	699 (-264)
6	Brad Smith	608 (-355)
7	A. J. Moyer	570 (-393)
8	William Sawalich	511 (-452)
9	Toni Breidinger	489 (-474)
10	Tim Monroe	353 (-610)

- Note: Only the first 10 positions are included for the driver standings.

Previous race: 2023 Bush's Beans 200	ARCA Menards Series; 2023 season	Next race: 2023 Shore Lunch 200
