= 2021 General Tire 150 (Phoenix) =

Race details
- Race 2 of 20 in the 2021 ARCA Menards Series
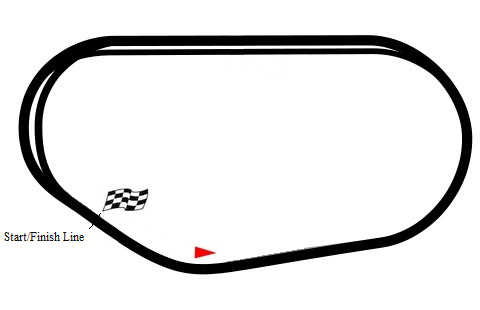
- Date: March 12, 2021
- Location: Phoenix Raceway in Avondale, Arizona
- Course: Permanent racing facility
- Course length: 1 miles (1.609 km)
- Distance: 150 laps, 150 mi (241.401 km)

Pole position
| Driver | Ty Gibbs | Joe Gibbs Racing |
- Time: 26.978

Most laps led
| Driver | Ty Gibbs | Joe Gibbs Racing |
- Laps: 124

Winner
| No. 18 | Ty Gibbs | Joe Gibbs Racing |

Television in the United States
- Network: FS1

The 2021 General Tire 150 was an ARCA Menards Series race held on March 12, 2021. Contested over 150 laps on the 1-mile (1.6 km) oval, it was the second race of the 2021 ARCA Menards Series season.

== Entry list ==
| No. | Driver | Team | Manufacturer |
|---|---|---|---|
| 01 | Bryce Haugeberg | Fast Track Racing | Chevrolet |
| 02 | Toni Breidinger | Young's Motorsports | Chevrolet |
| 2 | Nick Sanchez (R) | Rev Racing | Chevrolet |
| 6 | Trevor Huddleston | Sunrise Ford Racing | Ford |
| 7 | Takuma Koga | Jerry Pitts Racing | Toyota |
| 9 | Jake Drew | Sunrise Ford Racing | Ford |
| 10 | Mark Lowrey | Fast Track Racing | Ford |
| 11 | Richard Garvie | Fast Track Racing | Toyota |
| 12 | D. L. Wilson | Fast Track Racing | Chevrolet |
| 13 | Todd Souza | Central Coast Racing | Ford |
| 15 | Drew Dollar | Venturini Motorsports | Toyota |
| 16 | Jesse Love | Bill McAnally Racing | Toyota |
| 17 | Taylor Gray | David Gilliland Racing | Ford |
| 17W | Zane Smith | Steve McGowan Motorsports | Chevrolet |
| 18 | Ty Gibbs | Joe Gibbs Racing | Toyota |
| 19 | Derek Kraus | Bill McAnally Racing | Toyota |
| 20 | Corey Heim | Venturini Motorsports | Toyota |
| 21 | Jack Wood (R) | GMS Racing | Chevrolet |
| 25 | Gracie Trotter | Venturini Motorsports | Toyota |
| 27 | Tim Richmond | Richmond Clubb Motorsports | Chevrolet |
| 27W | Bobby Hillis Jr. | Hillis Racing | Chevrolet |
| 28 | Kyle Sieg | RSS Racing | Chevrolet |
| 33 | P. J. Pedroncelli | Pedroncelli Racing | Toyota |
| 46 | Thad Moffitt | David Gilliland Racing | Ford |
| 48 | Brad Smith | Brad Smith Motorsports | Chevrolet |
| 51 | Dean Thompson | High Point Racing | Ford |
| 54 | Joey Iest | Naake-Klauer Motorsports | Ford |
| 77 | Tony Toste | Performance P-1 Motorsports | Toyota |
| 88 | Bridget Burgess | BMI Racing | Chevrolet |
| 99 | Cole Moore | Bill McAnally Racing | Toyota |

== Practice ==
Ty Gibbs was fastest in practice with a time of 26.978 seconds and a speed of 133.442 mph (214.754 km/h).

| Pos | No. | Driver | Team | Manufacturer | Time | Speed |
|---|---|---|---|---|---|---|
| 1 | 18 | Ty Gibbs | Joe Gibbs Racing | Toyota | 26.978 | 133.442 |
| 2 | 20 | Corey Heim | Venturini Motorsports | Toyota | 27.242 | 132.159 |
| 3 | 15 | Drew Dollar | Venturini Motorsports | Toyota | 27.311 | 131.815 |

== Qualifying ==
Qualifying was cancelled due to rain. Ty Gibbs earned the pole for the race, as starting lineup was determined by practice times.

=== Qualifying results ===
| Pos | No | Driver | Team | Manufacturer | Time |
|---|---|---|---|---|---|
| 1 | 18 | Ty Gibbs | Joe Gibbs Racing | Toyota | |
| 2 | 20 | Corey Heim | Venturini Motorsports | Toyota | |
| 3 | 15 | Drew Dollar | Venturini Motorsports | Toyota | |
| 4 | 17 | Taylor Gray | David Gilliland Racing | Ford | |
| 5 | 25 | Gracie Trotter | Venturini Motorsports | Toyota | |
| 6 | 2 | Nick Sanchez (R) | Rev Racing | Chevrolet | |
| 7 | 21 | Jack Wood (R) | GMS Racing | Chevrolet | |
| 8 | 17W | Zane Smith | Steve McGowan Motorsports | Chevrolet | |
| 9 | 46 | Thad Moffitt | David Gilliland Racing | Ford | |
| 10 | 13 | Todd Souza | Central Coast Racing | Ford | |
| 11 | 16 | Jesse Love | Bill McAnally Racing | Toyota | |
| 12 | 54 | Joey Iest | Naake-Klauer Motorsports | Ford | |
| 13 | 19 | Derek Kraus | Bill McAnally Racing | Toyota | |
| 14 | 6 | Trevor Huddleston | Sunrise Ford Racing | Ford | |
| 15 | 9 | Jake Drew | Sunrise Ford Racing | Ford | |
| 16 | 28 | Kyle Sieg | RSS Racing | Chevrolet | |
| 17 | 51 | Dean Thompson | High Point Racing | Ford | |
| 18 | 33 | P. J. Pedroncelli | Pedroncelli Racing | Toyota | |
| 19 | 7 | Takuma Koga | Jerry Pitts Racing | Toyota | |
| 20 | 99 | Cole Moore | Bill McAnally Racing | Toyota | |
| 21 | 02 | Toni Breidinger | Young's Motorsports | Chevrolet | |
| 22 | 10 | Mark Lowrey | Fast Track Racing | Ford | |
| 23 | 77 | Tony Toste | Performance P-1 Motorsports | Toyota | |
| 24 | 88 | Bridget Burgess | BMI Racing | Chevrolet | |
| 25 | 27 | Tim Richmond | Richmond Clubb Motorsports | Chevrolet | |
| 26 | 01 | Bryce Haugeberg | Fast Track Racing | Chevrolet | |
| 27 | 12 | D. L. Wilson | Fast Track Racing | Chevrolet | |
| 28 | 11 | Richard Garvie | Fast Track Racing | Toyota | |
| 29 | 48 | Brad Smith | Brad Smith Motorsports | Chevrolet | |
| 30 | 27W | Bobby Hillis Jr. | Hillis Racing | Chevrolet | |

== Race ==
=== Race results ===
Laps: 150

| Fin | St | # | Driver | Team | Make | Laps | Led | Status | Points |
|---|---|---|---|---|---|---|---|---|---|
| 1 | 1 | 18 | Ty Gibbs | Joe Gibbs Racing | Toyota | 150 | 124 | Running | 49 |
| 2 | 2 | 20 | Corey Heim | Venturini Motorsports | Toyota | 150 | 1 | Running | 43 |
| 3 | 9 | 46 | Thad Moffitt | David Gilliland Racing | Ford | 150 | 5 | Running | 42 |
| 4 | 16 | 28 | Kyle Sieg | RSS Racing | Chevrolet | 150 | 0 | Running | 40 |
| 5 | 13 | 19 | Derek Kraus | Bill McAnally Racing | Toyota | 150 | 0 | Running | 39 |
| 6 | 11 | 16 | Jesse Love | Bill McAnally Racing | Toyota | 150 | 0 | Running | 38 |
| 7 | 3 | 15 | Drew Dollar | Venturini Motorsports | Toyota | 150 | 5 | Running | 38 |
| 8 | 10 | 13 | Todd Souza | Central Coast Racing | Ford | 150 | 0 | Running | 36 |
| 9 | 4 | 17 | Taylor Gray | David Gilliland Racing | Ford | 149 | 15 | Running | 36 |
| 10 | 14 | 6 | Trevor Huddleston | Sunrise Ford Racing | Ford | 148 | 0 | Running | 34 |
| 11 | 18 | 33 | P. J. Pedroncelli | Pedroncelli Racing | Toyota | 148 | 0 | Running | 33 |
| 12 | 20 | 99 | Cole Moore | Bill McAnally Racing | Toyota | 148 | 0 | Running | 32 |
| 13 | 25 | 27 | Tim Richmond | Richmond Clubb Motorsports | Chevrolet | 147 | 0 | Running | 31 |
| 14 | 22 | 10 | Mark Lowrey | Fast Track Racing | Ford | 147 | 0 | Running | 30 |
| 15 | 17 | 51 | Dean Thompson | High Point Racing | Ford | 147 | 0 | Running | 29 |
| 16 | 12 | 54 | Joey Iest | Naake-Klauer Motorsports | Ford | 146 | 0 | Running | 28 |
| 17 | 23 | 77 | Tony Toste | Performance P-1 Motorsports | Toyota | 146 | 0 | Running | 27 |
| 18 | 15 | 9 | Jake Drew | Sunrise Ford Racing | Ford | 144 | 0 | Running | 26 |
| 19 | 28 | 11 | Richard Garvie | Fast Track Racing | Toyota | 141 | 0 | Running | 25 |
| 20 | 27 | 12 | D. L. Wilson | Fast Track Racing | Chevrolet | 140 | 0 | Running | 24 |
| 21 | 6 | 2 | Nick Sanchez (R) | Rev Racing | Chevrolet | 120 | 0 | Accident | 23 |
| 22 | 24 | 88 | Bridget Burgess | BMI Racing | Chevrolet | 118 | 0 | Running | 22 |
| 23 | 19 | 7 | Takuma Koga | Jerry Pitts Racing | Toyota | 93 | 0 | Accident | 21 |
| 24 | 30 | 27W | Bobby Hillis Jr. | Hillis Racing | Chevrolet | 53 | 0 | Handling | 20 |
| 25 | 26 | 01 | Bryce Haugeberg | Fast Track Racing | Chevrolet | 32 | 0 | Accident | 19 |
| 26 | 29 | 48 | Brad Smith | Brad Smith Motorsports | Chevrolet | 15 | 0 | Differential | 18 |
| 27 | 5 | 25 | Gracie Trotter | Venturini Motorsports | Toyota | 0 | 0 | Accident | 17 |
| 28 | 8 | 17W | Zane Smith | Steve McGowen Motorsports | Chevrolet | 0 | 0 | Accident | 16 |
| 29 | 7 | 21 | Jack Wood (R) | GMS Racing | Chevrolet | 0 | 0 | Accident | 15 |
| 30 | 21 | 02 | Toni Breidinger | Young's Motorsports | Chevrolet | 0 | 0 | Accident | 14 |

| Previous race: 2021 Lucas Oil 200 | ARCA Menards Series; 2021 season | Next race: 2021 General Tire 200 |
