= Jeff Anton =

American racing driver (born 1981)

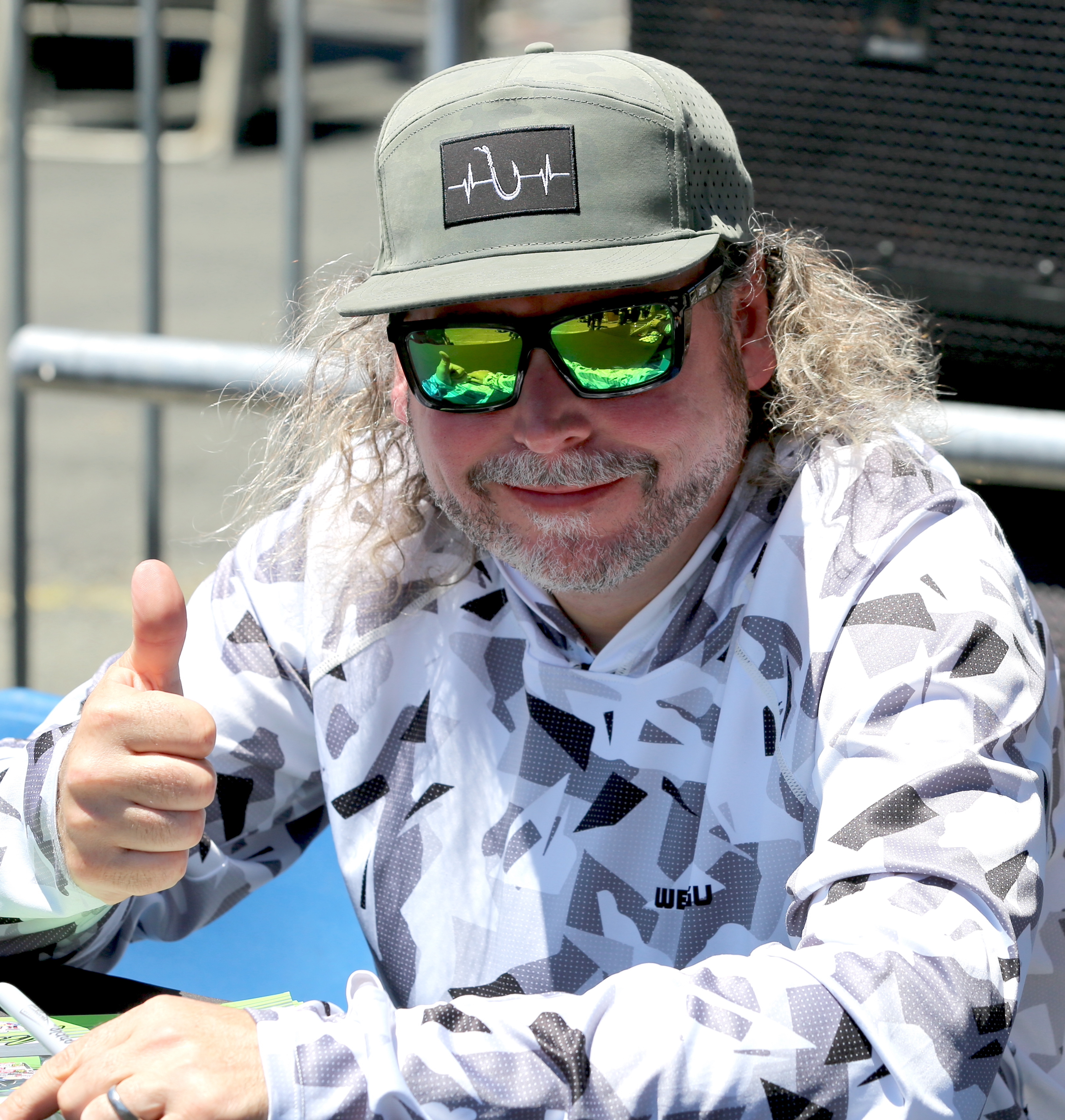
- Anton at Sonoma Raceway in 2026
- Born: March 9, 1981 (age 45); Russell, Massachusetts, U.S.

ARCA Menards Series career
- 3 races run over 2 years
- Best finish: 63rd (2026)
- First race: 2025 Lime Rock Park 100 (Lime Rock)
- Last race: 2026 Lime Rock Park ARCA 100 (Lime Rock)
Wins	Top tens	Poles
0	2	0

ARCA Menards Series East career
- 70 races run over 9 years
- Best finish: 9th (2006)
- First race: 2004 Mohegan Sun 150 Presented by Pepsi (Watkins Glen)
- Last race: 2012 American Real TV 150 (Dover)
Wins	Top tens	Poles
0	19	0

ARCA Menards Series West career
- 5 races run over 4 years
- Best finish: 32nd (2026)
- First race: 2006 United Rentals 125 (Phoenix)
- Last race: 2026 Portland 112 (Portland)
Wins	Top tens	Poles
0	3	0
- Statistics up to date as of November 2, 2026.

Jeff Anton (born March 9, 1981) is an American professional stock car racing driver. He last competed part-time in the ARCA Menards Series, driving the No. 44 Chevrolet for 1/4 Ley Racing, and part-time in the ARCA Menards Series West, driving the No. 44 Chevrolet for his own team, Anton Racing.

== Racing career ==
From 2004 to 2012, Anton competed in the NASCAR K&N Pro Series East, where he earned nineteen top-ten finishes, and scoring a best points finish of ninth in 2006. He made two starts in the NASCAR Camping World West Series, one in 2006 and one in 2009.

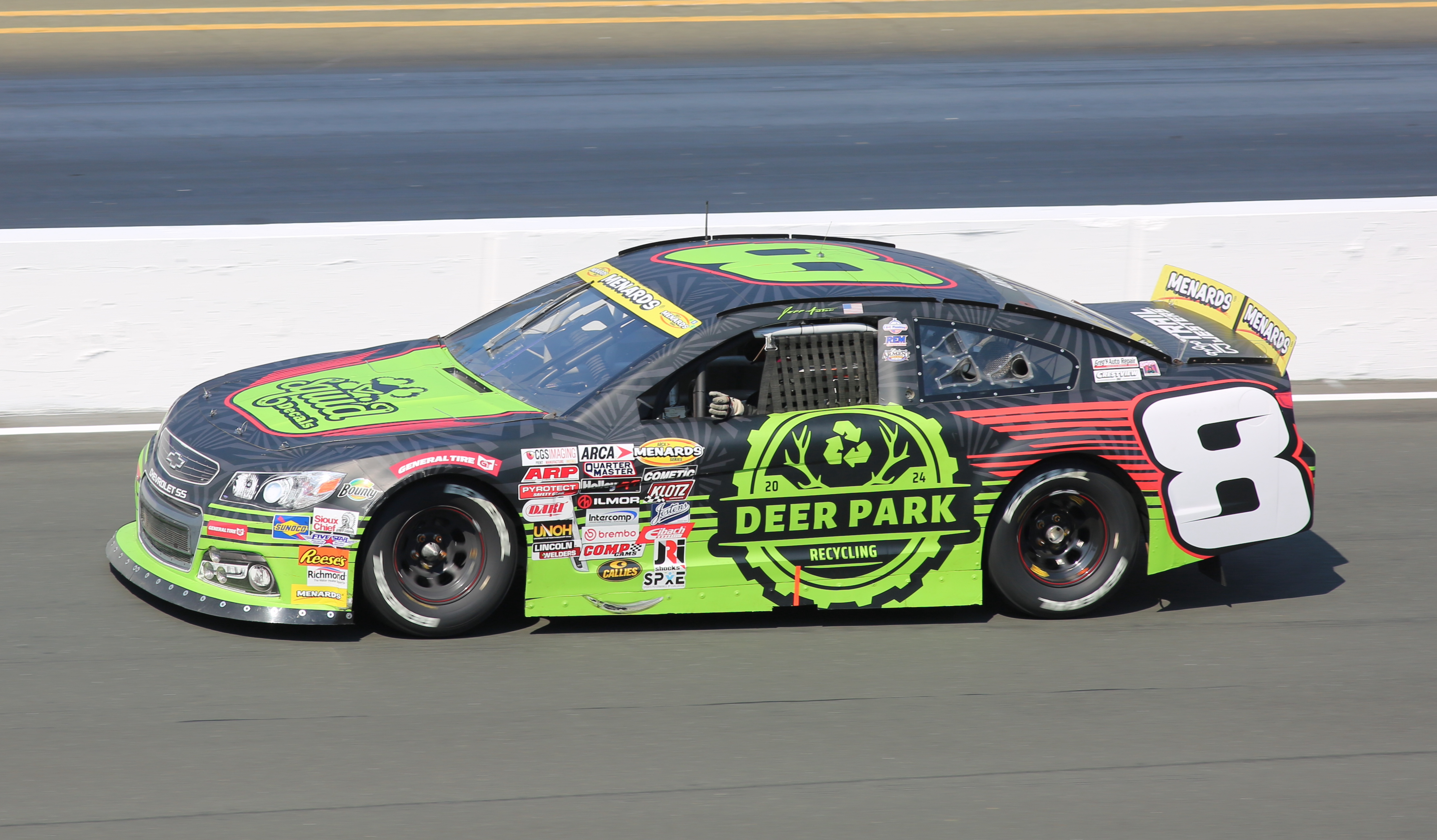
Anton's No. 8 car at Sonoma Raceway in 2025

In 2025, it was revealed that Anton would make his ARCA Menards Series debut at Lime Rock Park, driving the No. 3 Chevrolet for Mullins Racing. He finished in eighth place after starting in eleventh. He then made his first ARCA Menards Series West start since 2009 at Sonoma Raceway, this time driving the No. 8 Chevrolet for 1/4 Ley Racing, where he finished in tenth.

== Motorsports results ==
=== NASCAR ===
(key) (Bold - Pole position awarded by qualifying time. Italics - Pole position earned by points standings or practice time. * – Most laps led.)

==== K&N Pro Series East ====
NASCAR K&N Pro Series East results
Year	Team	No.	Make	1	2	3	4	5	6	7	8	9	10	11	12	13	14	NKNPSEC	Pts	Ref
2004	Anton Racing	30	Pontiac	LEE	TMP	LRP	SEE	STA	HOL	ERI	WFD	NHA	ADI	GLN; 15	NHA; 38	DOV		43rd	167	
2005	Anton Racing	30	Chevy	STA; DNQ	HOL; 19	ERI; 18	NHA; 29	WFD; 19	ADI; 10	STA; 16	DUB; 18		NHA; 24	DOV; 19	LRP; 15	TMP; 19		17th	1349	
2005	Anton Racing	30	Pontiac									OXF; 22						17th	1349	
2006	Anton Racing	30	Chevy	GRE; 7	STA; 9	HOL; 19	TMP; 24	ERI; 11	NHA; 16	ADI; 6	WFD; 21	NHA; 21	DOV; 9	LRP; 10				9th	1353	
2007	Anton Racing	30	Chevy	GRE; 18	ELK; 11	IOW; 3	SBO; 12	STA; 18	NHA; 14	TMP; 10	NSH; 7	ADI; 15	LRP; 3	MFD; 19	NHA; 29	DOV; 13		10th	1630	
2008	Anton Racing	30	Chevy	GRE; 16	IOW; 16	SBO; 12	GLN; 25	NHA; 15	TMP; 10	NSH; 15	ADI; 20	LRP; 9	MFD; 14	NHA; 10	DOV; 24	STA; 21		12th	1502	
2009	Anton Racing	30	Chevy	GRE; 21	TRI	IOW	SBO	GLN; DNQ	NHA; 14	TMP	ADI	LRP; 10	NHA; 22	DOV; 25				18th	637	
2010	Anton Racing	30	Chevy	GRE; 20	SBO; 13	IOW; 10	MAR; 10	NHA; 19	LRP; 8	LEE; 18	JFC; 21	NHA; 3	DOV; 12					11th	1244	
2011	Anton Racing	30	Chevy	GRE	SBO	RCH	IOW	BGS	JFC	LGY	NHA; DNQ	COL	GRE	NHA; 28	DOV; 10			40th	262	
2012	Anton Racing	30	Chevy	BRI	GRE	RCH	IOW	BGS	JFC	LGY	CNB	COL	IOW	NHA; 17	DOV; 14	GRE	CAR	43rd	57	

=== ARCA Menards Series ===
(key) (Bold – Pole position awarded by qualifying time. Italics – Pole position earned by points standings or practice time. * – Most laps led.)

ARCA Menards Series results
Year	Team	No.	Make	1	2	3	4	5	6	7	8	9	10	11	12	13	14	15	16	17	18	19	20	AMSC	Pts	Ref
2025	Mullins Racing	3	Chevy	DAY	PHO	TAL	KAN	CLT	MCH	BLN	ELK	LRP; 8	DOV	IRP	IOW	GLN	ISF	MAD	DSF	BRI	SLM	KAN	TOL	96th	36	
2026	1/4 Ley Racing	44	Chevy	DAY	PHO	KAN	TAL	GLN; 11	TOL	MCH	POC	BER	ELK	CHI	LRP; 10	IRP	IOW	ISF	MAD	DSF	SLM	BRI	KAN	63rd	67	

==== ARCA Menards Series West ====
ARCA Menards Series West results
Year	Team	No.	Make	1	2	3	4	5	6	7	8	9	10	11	12	13	AMSWC	Pts	Ref
2006	Clay Andrews Racing	30	Chevy	PHO; 17	PHO	S99	IRW	SON	DCS	IRW	EVG	S99	CAL	CTS	AMP		64th	112	
2009	Anton Racing	30	Chevy	CTS	AAS	PHO	MAD	IOW	DCS	SON	IRW	PIR	MMP	CNS	IOW; 19	AAS	64th	106	
2025	1/4 Ley Racing	8	Chevy	KER	PHO	TUC	CNS	KER	SON; 10	TRI	PIR	AAS	MAD	LVS	PHO		56th	34	
2026	Anton Racing	44	Chevy	KER	PHO	TUC	SHA	CNS	TRI	SON; 8	PIR; 6	AAS	MAD	LVS	PHO	KER	32nd	74	
