= Austin Varco =

American racing driver (born 1999)

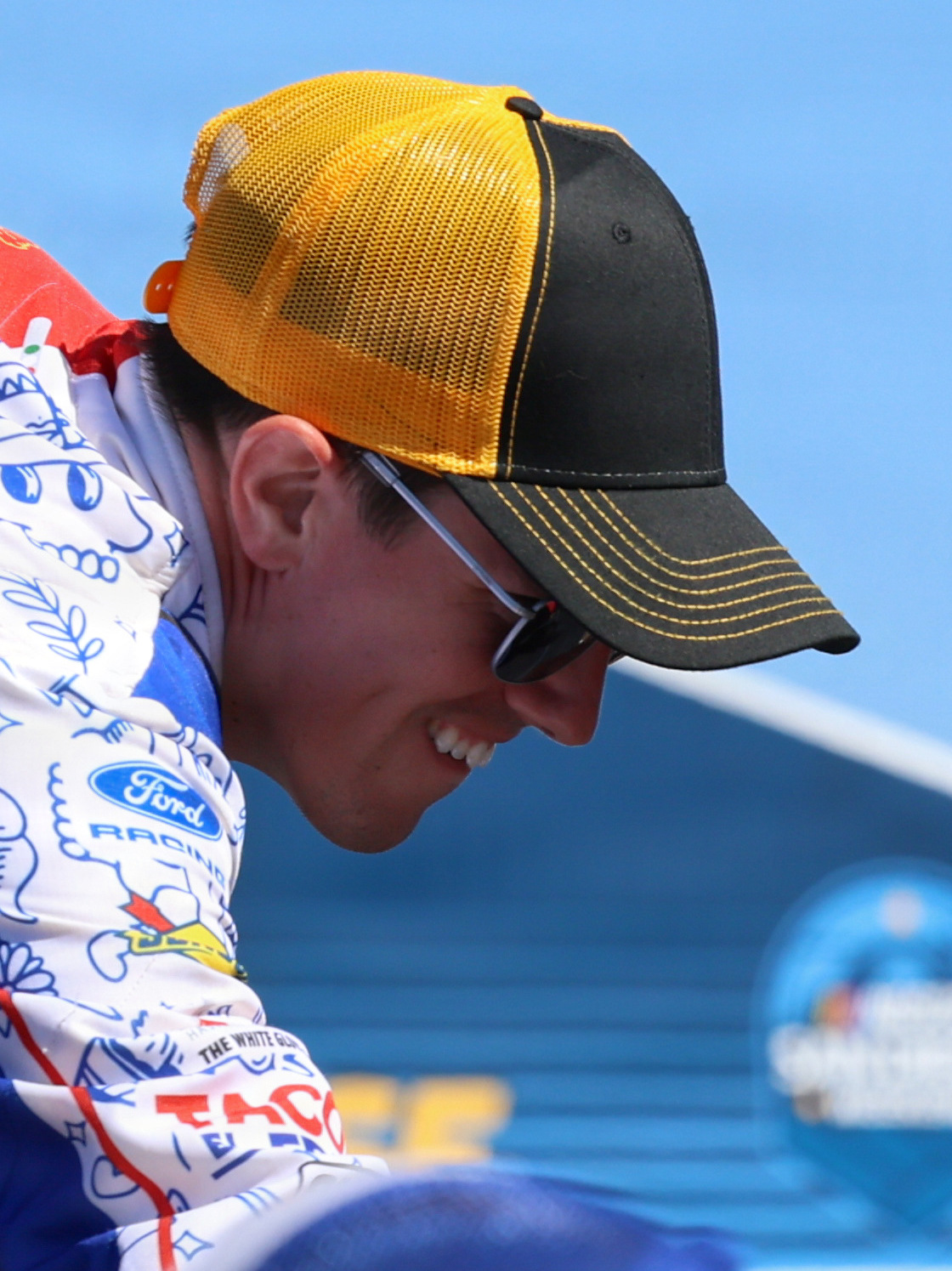
- Varco at the Coronado Street Course in 2026
- Born: September 11, 1999 (age 27); Chula Vista, California, U.S.

NASCAR FedEx Freight Truck Series career
- 1 race run over 1 year
- 2026 position: 68th
- Best finish: 68th (2026)
- First race: 2026 Navy 250 (San Diego)
Wins	Top tens	Poles
0	0	0

ARCA Menards Series West career
- 3 races run over 2 years
- Best finish: 41st (2026)
- First race: 2025 Portland 112 (Portland)
- Last race: 2026 Portland 112 (Portland)
Wins	Top tens	Poles
0	0	0
- Statistics up to date as of November 6, 2026.

Austin Varco (born September 11, 1999) is an American professional stock car racing driver. He last competed part-time in the NASCAR Craftsman Truck Series, driving the No. 22 Ford F-150 for Team Reaume, and part-time in the ARCA Menards Series West, driving the No. 51 Chevrolet for Strike Mamba Racing.

Varco has previously competed in the NASCAR Weekly Series.

== Racing career ==
=== Early career ===
Varco began his racing career at the age of four, where he competed in go-karts, before competing into other sports during his teenage years. After being enrolled into the University of Southern California, Varco returned to racing, obtaining an SCCA scholarship and competing in Spec Miata, where he won multiple national races and the series’ rookie of the year title in 2022. He is twice nominated for the Mazda MX-5 Cup Shootout.

=== ARCA Menards Series West ===
In 2025, Varco made his debut in the ARCA Menards Series West at Portland International Raceway, driving the No. 72 Chevrolet for Strike Mamba Racing. After placing 14th in the lone practice session, he qualified in 11th, and finished one lap down in 13th.

In 2026, Varco returned to the West Series with SMR, this time driving the No. 51 Chevrolet at Kevin Harvick's Kern Raceway, serving as a last minute replacement for Jayda Mack, who was originally scheduled to drive the car that weekend. Varco finished in 22nd after running 26 laps due to transmission issues. Varco was later announced to compete at Portland in the No. 51 for SMR.

=== NASCAR Craftsman Truck Series ===
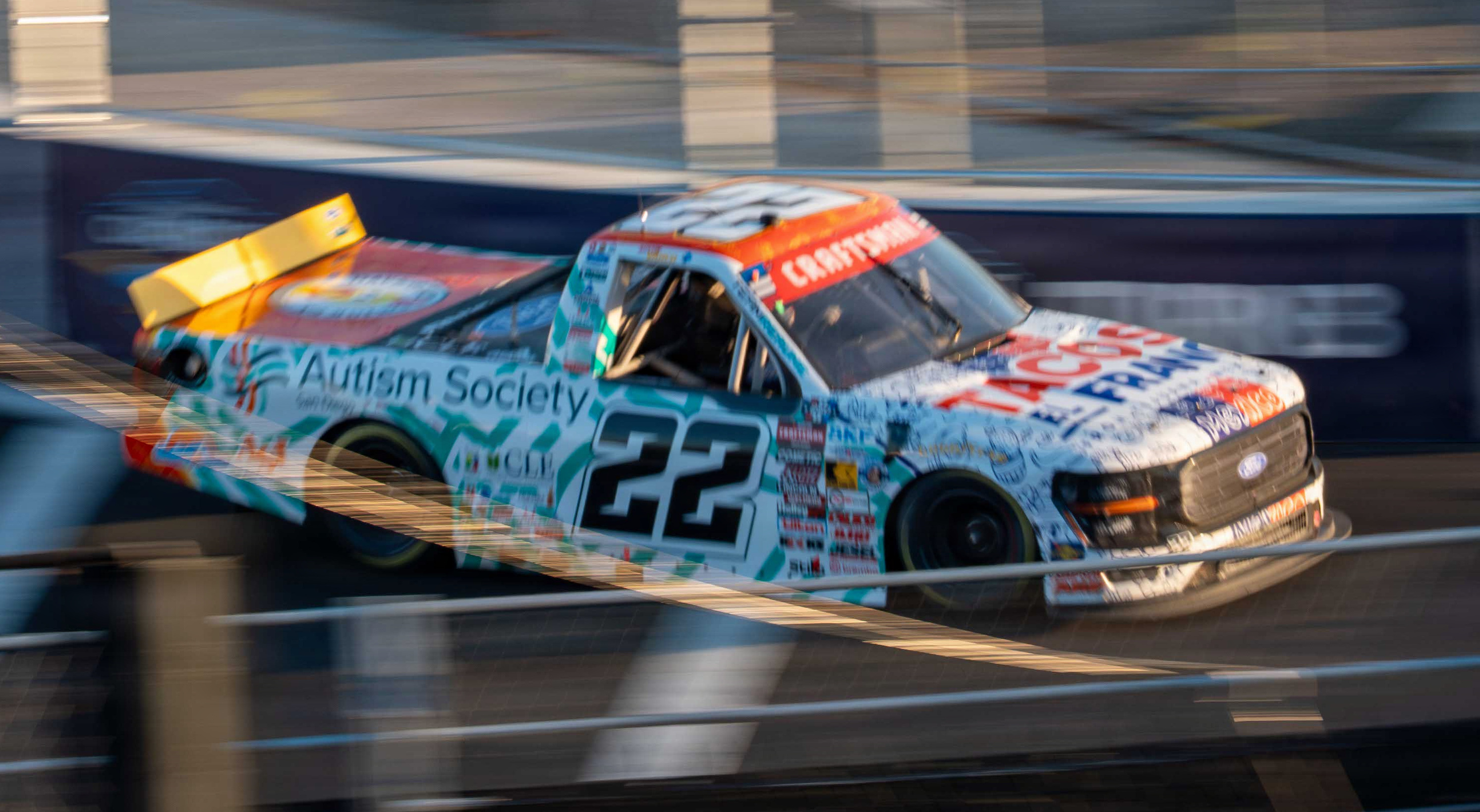
Varco's No. 22 truck at Naval Base Coronado in 2026

In June 2026, it was announced that Varco would make his NASCAR Craftsman Truck Series at the Coronado Street Course, driving the No. 22 Ford for Team Reaume. He finished 17th in his first race.

== Personal life ==
Varco is diagnosed with autism, having been diagnosed in 2021.

Varco's parents, David and Suzanne, were previously amateur club racers.

== Motorsports career results ==
=== Stock car career summary ===
Season	Series	Team	Races	Wins	Top 5	Top 10	Points	Position
2025	ARCA Menards Series West	Strike Mamba Racing	1	0	0	0	31	62nd
2026	ARCA Menards Series West	Strike Mamba Racing	2	0	0	0	49	41st
2026	NASCAR Craftsman Truck Series	Team Reaume	1	0	0	0	20	68th

=== NASCAR ===
(key) (Bold – Pole position awarded by qualifying time. Italics – Pole position earned by points standings or practice time. * – Most laps led.)

==== Craftsman Truck Series ====
NASCAR Craftsman Truck Series results
Year	Team	No.	Make	1	2	3	4	5	6	7	8	9	10	11	12	13	14	15	16	17	18	19	20	21	22	23	24	25	NCTC	Pts	Ref
2026	Team Reaume	22	Ford	DAY	ATL	STP	DAR	CAR	BRI	TEX	GLN	DOV	CLT	NSH	MCH	COR; 17	LRP	NWS	IRP	RCH	NHA	BRI	KAN	CLT	PHO	TAL	MAR	HOM	68th	20	

=== ARCA Menards Series West ===
(key) (Bold – Pole position awarded by qualifying time. Italics – Pole position earned by points standings or practice time. * – Most laps led. ** – All laps led.)

ARCA Menards Series West results
Year	Team	No.	Make	1	2	3	4	5	6	7	8	9	10	11	12	13	AMSWC	Pts	Ref
2025	Strike Mamba Racing	72	Chevy	KER	PHO	TUC	CNS	KER	SON	TRI	PIR; 13	AAS	MAD	LVS	PHO		62nd	31	
2026	Strike Mamba Racing	51	Chevy	KER; 22	PHO	TUC	SHA	CNS	TRI	SON	PIR; 17	AAS	MAD	LVS	PHO	KER	41st	49	
