= 2025 NAPA Auto Parts 150 =

2025 NAPA Auto Parts 150 may refer to:

- 2025 NAPA Auto Parts 150 (Kern Raceway), at Kevin Harvick's Kern Raceway on June 14
- 2025 NAPA Auto Parts 150 (Roseville), at All American Speedway on September 13

== See also ==
- 2025 NAPA Auto Care 150, at Tri-City Raceway on August 9
