= Hudson Sharp =

American racing driver

- Born: April 21, 2009 (age 17) North Palm Beach, Florida, U.S.

CARS Late Model Stock Tour career
- Debut season: 2026
- Years active: 2026–present
- Starts: 1
- Championships: 0
- Wins: 0
- Poles: 0
- Best finish: 57th in 2026

ARCA Menards Series West career
- 1 race run over 1 year
- Best finish: 49th (2026)
- First race: 2026 NAPA Auto Parts 150 (Bakersfield)
Wins	Top tens	Poles
0	1	0
- Statistics up to date as of November 2, 2026.

Hudson Sharp (born April 21, 2009) is an American professional stock car racing driver. He last competed part-time in the ARCA Menards Series West, driving the No. 70 Toyota for Nitro Motorsports.

== Racing career ==
Sharp has competed in series such as the CARS Late Model Stock Tour, the I-95 Showdown Series, the Paramount Kia Big 10 Challenge, the World Series of Asphalt Stock Car Racing, and the NASCAR Local Racing Series.

=== ARCA Menards Series West ===
In October 2026, it was revealed that Sharp would make his debut in the ARCA Menards Series West at the Kevin Harvick's Kern Raceway, driving the No. 70 Toyota for Nitro Motorsports.

== Motorsports results ==
=== Stock car career summary ===
Season	Series	Team	Races	Wins	Top 5	Top 10	Points	Position
2026	CARS Late Model Stock Car Tour	Lee Faulk Racing	1	0	0	1	32	57th
2026	ARCA Menards Series West	Nitro Motorsports	1	0	1	1	41	49th

=== ARCA Menards Series West ===
(key) (Bold – Pole position awarded by qualifying time. Italics – Pole position earned by points standings or practice time. * – Most laps led. ** – All laps led.)

ARCA Menards Series West results
Year	Team	No.	Make	1	2	3	4	5	6	7	8	9	10	11	12	13	AMSWC	Pts	Ref
2026	Nitro Motorsports	70	Toyota	KER	PHO	TUC	SHA	CNS	TRI	SON	PIR	AAS	MAD	LVS	PHO	KER; 3	49th	41	

=== CARS Late Model Stock Car Tour ===
(key) (Bold – Pole position awarded by qualifying time. Italics – Pole position earned by points standings or practice time. * – Most laps led. ** – All laps led.)

CARS Late Model Stock Car Tour results
Year	Team	No.	Make	1	2	3	4	5	6	7	8	9	10	11	12	13	14	CLMSCTC	Pts	Ref
2026	Lee Faulk Racing	15	Toyota	SNM	WCS	NSV	CRW	ACE	LGY	DOM	NWS	HCY	AND	FLC	TCM; 10	NPS	SBO	57th	32	
