= Team Reaume =

American auto racing team

- Owner: Josh Reaume
- Base: Mooresville, North Carolina
- Series: NASCAR Craftsman Truck Series
- Race drivers: 2. Timmy Hill; 22. Jason White, Clayton Green, Jackson Lee, Frankie Muniz, Morgen Baird; 33. Natalie Decker, Josh Reaume, Carter Fartuch, Clayton Green, Austin Varco, Jackson Lee, Patrick Emerling
- Manufacturer: Ford
- Opened: 2018

Career
- Debut: Truck Series: 2018 Active Pest Control 200 (Atlanta); ARCA Menards Series: 2024 Tide 150 (Kansas); ARCA Menards Series East: 2024 Circle City 200 (IRP)
- Latest race: Truck Series: 2026 Craftsman 200 (Homestead); ARCA Menards Series: 2024 Reese's 150 (Kansas); ARCA Menards Series East: 2024 Bush's Beans 200 (Bristol)
- Races competed: Total: 208; Truck Series: 198; ARCA Menards Series: 7 ARCA Menards Series East: 3
- Drivers' Championships: Total: 0 Truck Series: 0 ARCA Menards Series: 0 ARCA Menards Series East: 0
- Race victories: Total: 0 Truck Series: 0 ARCA Menards Series: 0 ARCA Menards Series East: 0
- Pole positions: Total: 0 Truck Series: 0 ARCA Menards Series: 0 ARCA Menards Series East: 0

Team Reaume (formerly known as Reaume Brothers Racing) is an American professional stock car racing team that currently competes full–time in the NASCAR Craftsman Truck Series. The team is owned by Josh Reaume and it currently fields the No. 2 Ford F-150 for Timmy Hill, the No. 22 for multiple drivers, and the No. 33 full-time for multiple drivers.

== Driver Development Program ==
In July 2021, Reaume Brothers Racing announced its new late model driver development program. In a press release, it was announced former kart racer Stephen Mallozzi and RBR employee Johnathan Cuevas would be the program’s two inaugural drivers. Reaume expressed a desire to help young drivers the way he had been helped throughout his career, and felt creating a development program was the best way to go about doing so.

== Xfinity Series ==
In 2020, RBR took over operations of the RSS Racing No. 93 entry in late June and retained those duties for the rest of the season. The partnership continued in 2021 with the RSS No. 23 before Our Motorsports purchased the car's owner points in March.

After Our acquired the No. 23, RBR formed a partnership to field MBM Motorsports' No. 13.

=== Car No. 33 history ===
In 2021, Loris Hezemans attempted this car at the Pennzoil 150, but failed to qualify.

In 2022, Reaume Brothers would run part-time with Natalie Decker driving the No. 33 on a part-time schedule with NERD Focus and Plant Life as sponsors, which will begin in the Beef. It’s What’s For Dinner. 300. Reaume later announced that Will Rodgers would be piloting the 33 in the Production Alliance Group 300 and at Circuit of the Americas. Loris Hezemans attempted to qualify at Phoenix.

==== Car No. 33 results ====
Year	Driver	No.	Make	1	2	3	4	5	6	7	8	9	10	11	12	13	14	15	16	17	18	19	20	21	22	23	24	25	26	27	28	29	30	31	32	33	Owners	Pts
2021	Loris Hezemans	33	Chevy	DAY	DAY	HOM	LVS	PHO	ATL	MAR	TAL	DAR	DOV	COA	CLT	MOH	TEX	NSH	POC	ROA	ATL	NHA	GLN	IND; DNQ	MCH	DAY	DAR	RCH	BRI	LVS	TAL	CLT	TEX	KAN	MAR	PHO	50th	0
2022	Natalie Decker	33	Toyota	DAY; DNQ																																	53rd	0
2022	Will Rodgers	33	Toyota		CAL; DNQ	LVS; Wth																															53rd	0
2022	Loris Hezemans	33	Toyota				PHO; DNQ	ATL	COA	RCH	MAR	TAL	DOV	DAR	TEX	CLT	PIR	NSH	ROA	ATL	NHA	POC	IRC	MCH	GLN	DAY	DAR	KAN	BRI	TEX	TAL	ROV	LVS	HOM	MAR	PHO	53rd	0

== Craftsman Truck Series ==
=== Truck No. 00 history ===
In 2020, Reaume debuted the No. 00. Angela Ruch was announced to be the full-time driver. However, after eight races, Ruch was released to a lack of sponsorship. For the rest of the season, Josh Reaume, Dawson Cram, Ryan Huff, Bobby Kennedy, J. J. Yeley, Kyle Donahue, Josh Bilicki and Jason White filled the schedule. The team's best finish was a seventeenth at Michigan International Speedway with team owner Reaume behind the wheel. Following the 2020 season the 00 team was shut down.

==== Truck No. 00 results ====
Year	Driver	No.	Make	1	2	3	4	5	6	7	8	9	10	11	12	13	14	15	16	17	18	19	20	21	22	23	Owners	Pts
2020	Angela Ruch	00	Chevy	DAY; 28																							27th	264
2020	Angela Ruch	00	Toyota		LVS; 24	CLT; 23	ATL; 28	HOM; 24		KEN; 25	TEX; 23																27th	264
2020	Josh Reaume	00	Toyota						POC; 23					MCH; 17				DAR; 28	RCH; 32		LVS; 29		KAN; 27				27th	264
2020	Josh Reaume	00	Chevy												DAY; RL										MAR; 37	PHO; 33	27th	264
2020	Dawson Cram	00	Toyota									KAN; 25															27th	264
2020	Ryan Huff	00	Toyota										KAN; 19														27th	264
2020	Bobby Kennedy	00	Chevy												DAY; 37												27th	264
2020	J. J. Yeley	00	Toyota													DOV; 26											27th	264
2020	Kyle Donahue	00	Toyota														GTW; 20										27th	264
2020	Josh Bilicki	00	Toyota																	BRI; 26				TEX; 19			27th	264
2020	Jason White	00	Chevy																			TAL; 25					27th	264

=== Truck No. 2 history ===
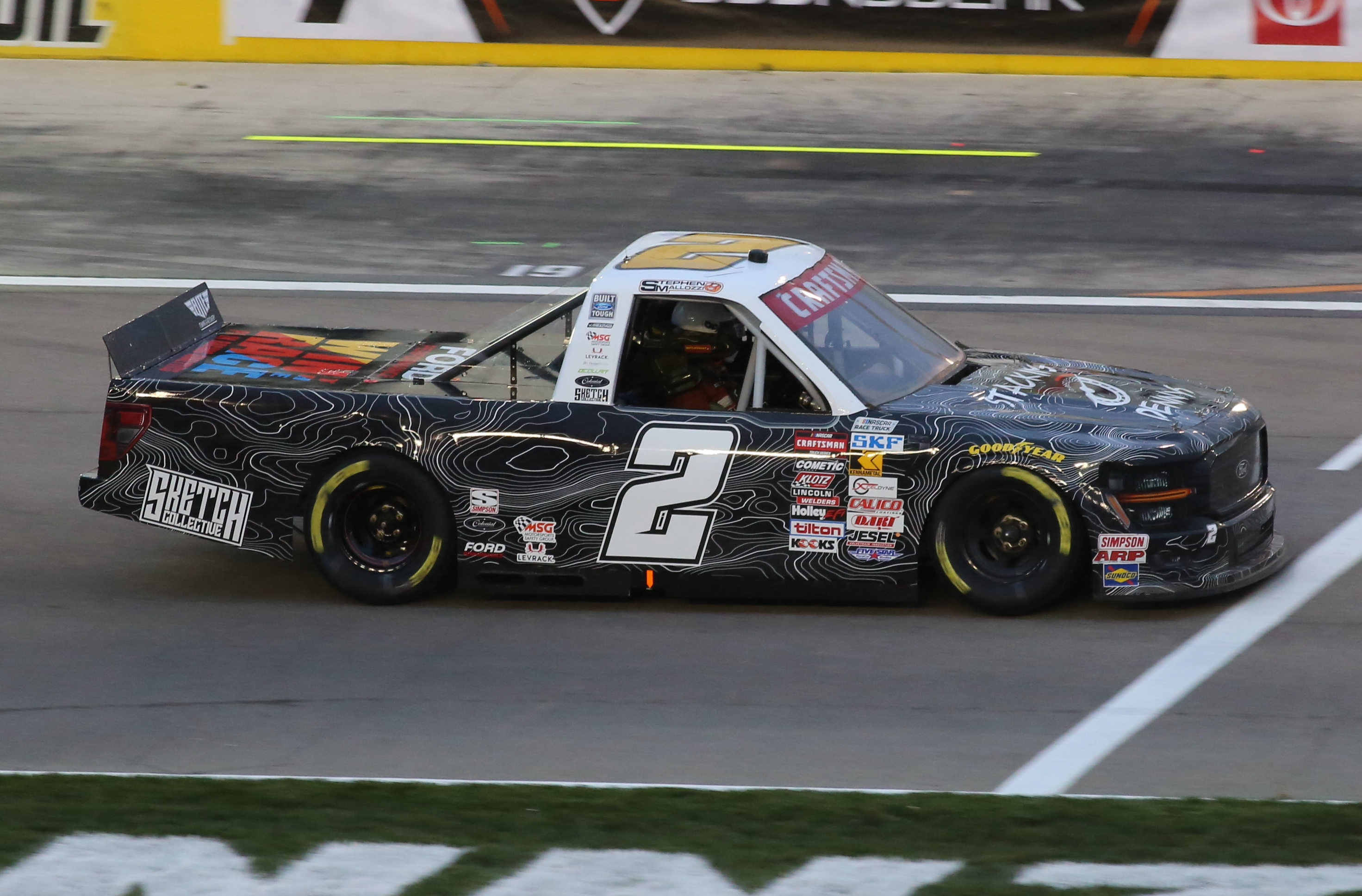
Stephen Mallozzi driving the No. 2 at Las Vegas Motor Speedway in 2025

On January 9, 2025, the team acquired the No. 2 from Rev Racing who ran the truck for the previous two seasons. With the acquisition, the team expanded to three full-time entries. The first driver was announced on January 14, with Tyler Tomassi and on January 21, it was announced that Cody Dennison would make his Truck Series debut in the No. 2 truck. Owner Josh Reaume would drive the No. 2 at Daytona. He finished 18th. Keith McGee drove the No. 2 at Atlanta. Stephen Mallozzi would drive the No. 2 truck for multiple races starting at Las Vegas. On April 18, it was revealed that Derek White would make a return to NASCAR at North Wilkesboro Speedway, driving the No. 2 truck. After starting in 26th due to qualifying being cancelled to due inclement weather, he went on to finish in 33rd after failing to maintain minimum speed shortly after the halfway point of the race. On May 28, the team announced that Clayton Green would drive the No. 2 at Nashville. Morgen Baird drove the No. 2 truck at Michigan. On June 23, it was revealed that William Lambros would make his debut in the NASCAR Craftsman Truck Series at Lime Rock Park, driving the No. 2 truck. He made his second Truck Series start in the same truck later in the summer at Watkins Glen International. Carter Fartuch would drive the No. 2 truck at Charlotte Roval.

On January 13, 2026, it was announced that Luke Baldwin will drive the No. 2 Ford in select races for the 2026 season starting at Rockingham. At New Hampshire, Baldwin failed to qualify for the race. As the result, he moved to the No. 33 truck. Jason White would drive the No. 2 at Daytona. Green would return to drive the No. 2 for another partial schedule starting at Atlanta. Fartuch would drive the No. 2 at St. Petersburg. Jackson Lee would drive the No. 2 at Watkins Glen, San Diego, and Lime Rock Park. Baird returned to drive the No. 2 at Michigan. Jackson Macenko would make his truck series debut at IRP. Dystany Spurlock would drive the No. 2 at her home track at Richmond. Mallozzi would return to drive the No. 2 at Kansas. Monty Tipton would drive the No. 2 at Phoenix and Martinsville.

On November 5, 2026, it was announced that Timmy Hill would drive the No. 2 full-time in 2027.

==== Truck No. 2 results ====
Year	Driver	No.	Make	1	2	3	4	5	6	7	8	9	10	11	12	13	14	15	16	17	18	19	20	21	22	23	24	25	Owners	Pts
2025	Josh Reaume	2	Ford	DAY; 18																						TAL; 24			31st	174
2025	Keith McGee	2	Ford		ATL; 32																								31st	174
2025	Stephen Mallozzi	2	Ford			LVS; 31	HOM; 34		BRI; 35	CAR; 33												DAR; 31		NHA; 35					31st	174
2025	Cody Dennison	2	Ford					MAR; 30			TEX; 19	KAN; 22		CLT; 29			POC; 33		IRP; 34										31st	174
2025	Derek White	2	Ford										NWS; 33																31st	174
2025	Clayton Green	2	Ford												NSH; 27						RCH; 35		BRI; 36				MAR; 35	PHO; 20	31st	174
2025	Morgen Baird	2	Ford													MCH; 29													31st	174
2025	William Lambros	2	Ford															LRP; 27		GLN; 35									31st	174
2025	Carter Fartuch	2	Ford																						ROV; 34				31st	174
2026	Jason White	2	Ford	DAY; 33																						TAL; 13			32nd	245
2026	Clayton Green	2	Ford		ATL; 23		DAR; 29			TEX; 26				NSH; 29															32nd	245
2026	Carter Fartuch	2	Ford			STP; 21																							32nd	245
2026	Luke Baldwin	2	Ford					ROC; 21	BRI; 32			DOV; 32	CLT; 36					NWS; 33			NHA; DNQ	BRI; 19		CLT; 22					32nd	245
2026	Jackson Lee	2	Ford								GLN; 26					COR; 27	LRP; 13												32nd	245
2026	Morgen Baird	2	Ford												MCH; 26														32nd	245
2026	Jackson Macenko	2	Ford																IRP; 36										32nd	245
2026	Dystany Spurlock	2	Ford																	RCH; 35									32nd	245
2026	Stephen Mallozzi	2	Ford																				KAN; 27						32nd	245
2026	Monty Tipton	2	Ford																						PHO; 31		MAR; 35		32nd	245
2026	Timmy Hill	2	Ford																									HOM; 17	32nd	245

=== Truck No. 22 history ===
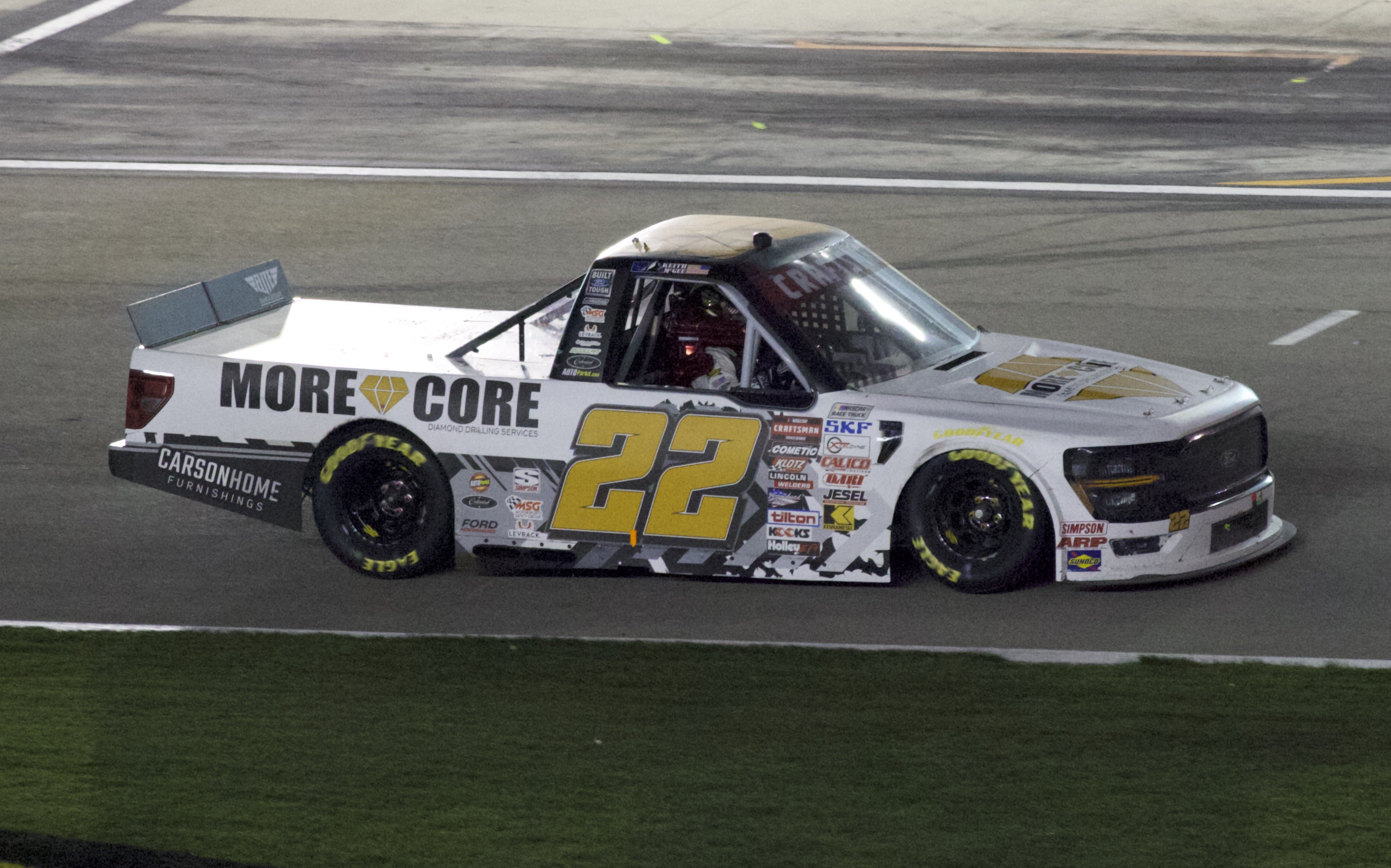
Keith McGee in the No. 22 truck at Las Vegas Motor Speedway in 2024.

On January 22, 2024 it was announced that RBR had acquired the owners points of the No. 16 of Hattori Racing Enterprises, the No. 22 of AM Racing, and the No. 30 of On Point Motorsports. They would field the No. 22 starting at Daytona. Jason White was announced as the driver of the No. 22 at Daytona. He made his second start at Talladega. Keith McGee would drive the No. 22 truck for multiple races starting at Atlanta. On March 19, 2024, it was announced that Carter Fartuch would make his NASCAR Craftsman Truck Series debut in the race at Circuit of the Americas driving the No. 22 truck. He started 29th and finished 21st. Stephen Mallozzi would drive the No. 22 truck at Martinsville and Pocono. Mason Maggio was scheduled to drive the No. 22 truck for four raves starting at Kansas. Owner Josh Reaume drove the No. 22 at North Wilkesboro Speedway. On June 19, the team announced that Frankie Muniz would make compete in three races during the 2024 season in the No. 22 truck, with Muniz making his Truck Series debut at Nashville. On June 5, the team annoinced that Tyler Tomassi would make his NASCAR Craftsman Truck Series debut at Lucas Oil Indianapolis Raceway Park, driving the No. 22 truck. Clayton Green would drive the No. 22 truck at Martinsville for the track's fall race.

In 2025, White drove the No. 22 truck to an 8th place finish at Daytona. Owner Josh Reaume would drive the No. 22 for multiple races starting at Atlanta. McGee drove the No. 22 truck at Homestead. On March 7, it was revealed that A. J. Waller would make his debut in the NASCAR Craftsman Truck Series at Martinsville Speedway, driving the No. 22 truck. Tomassi would drive the No. 22 for three races. Cody Dennison drove the No. 22 truck at Rockingham Speedway. Morgen Baird drove the No. 22 at Kansas Speedway. Maggio would drive the No. 22 truck at Charlotte Motor Speedway. Green would drive the No. 22 truck for two races at Pocono and Darlington. Alex Labbé would make his NASCAR Craftsman Truck Series debut at Lime Rock Park driving the No. 22 truck. On July 30, it was announced that Gian Buffomante would make his debut in the NASCAR Craftsman Truck Series at Watkins Glen International, driving the No. 22 truck. Mallozzi drove the No. 22 at Richmond. On September 4, it was announced that Blake Lothian would drive the No. 22 at New Hampshire.

In 2026, Reaume would drive the No. 22 for multiple races starting at Daytona. On February 5, 2026, it was announced that Jackson Lee will attempt to make his debut in the NASCAR Craftsman Truck Series at the St. Petersburg street circuit, driving the No. 22 Ford. Green would drive the No. 22 at Rockingham, Bristol, Kansas, fall Charlotte race, Phoenix, and Homestead. Natalie Decker would drive the No. 22 at Watkins Glen and Dover. In both races, Decker was parked by NASCAR for not running at a reasonable pace. Decker's husband Derek Lemke would drive the No. 22 at Nashville and Richmond. Austin Varco would make his truck series debut at San Diego. Monty Tipton would make his truck series debut at IRP. Patrick Emerling would drive the No. 22 at New Hampshire. Jackson Macenko would drive the No. 22 at Bristol night race.

==== Truck No. 22 results ====
Year	Driver	No.	Make	1	2	3	4	5	6	7	8	9	10	11	12	13	14	15	16	17	18	19	20	21	22	23	24	25	Owners	Pts
2024	Jason White	22	Ford	DAY; 12																			TAL; 20						32nd	214
2024	Keith McGee	22	Ford		ATL; 21	LVS; 27	BRI; 32			TEX; 28				CLT; 34	GTW; 27				RCH; 34		BRI; 33					PHO; 29			32nd	214
2024	Carter Fartuch	22	Ford					COA; 21																					32nd	214
2024	Stephen Mallozzi	22	Ford						MAR; 28																				32nd	214
2024	Mason Maggio	22	Ford								KAN; 29	DAR; 27					POC; 27			MLW; 27									32nd	214
2024	Josh Reaume	22	Ford										NWS; 33																32nd	214
2024	Frankie Muniz	22	Ford													NSH; 31						KAN; 29		HOM; 33					32nd	214
2024	Tyler Tomassi	22	Ford															IRP; 31											32nd	214
2024	Clayton Green	22	Ford																						MAR; 24				32nd	214
2025	Jason White	22	Ford	DAY; 8																						TAL; 30			30th	244
2025	Josh Reaume	22	Ford		ATL; 18	LVS; 28					TEX; 18					MCH; 25							BRI; 28		ROV; 33				30th	244
2025	Keith McGee	22	Ford				HOM; 30																						30th	244
2025	A. J. Waller	22	Ford					MAR; 31											IRP; 32								MAR; 32		30th	244
2025	Tyler Tomassi	22	Ford						BRI; 21				NWS; 31		NSH; 29														30th	244
2025	Cody Dennison	22	Ford							CAR; 27																			30th	244
2025	Morgen Baird	22	Ford									KAN; 25																	30th	244
2025	Mason Maggio	22	Ford											CLT; 28														PHO; 32	30th	244
2025	Clayton Green	22	Ford														POC; 30					DAR; 32							30th	244
2025	Alex Labbé	22	Ford															LRP; 34											30th	244
2025	Gian Buffomante	22	Ford																	GLN; 25									30th	244
2025	Stephen Mallozzi	22	Ford																		RCH; 34								30th	244
2025	Blake Lothian	22	Ford																					NHA; 20					30th	244
2026	Josh Reaume	22	Ford	DAY; 20	ATL; 24		DAR; 35			TEX; 22			CLT; 28		MCH; 30		LRP; 27									TAL; 22	MAR; 26		34th	208
2026	Jackson Lee	22	Ford			STP; 29																							34th	208
2026	Clayton Green	22	Ford					ROC; 29	BRI; 36									NWS; 31					KAN; 23	CLT; 36	PHO; 35			HOM; 31	34th	208
2026	Natalie Decker	22	Ford								GLN; 36	DOV; 36																	34th	208
2026	Derek Lemke	22	Ford											NSH; 21						RCH; 24									34th	208
2026	Austin Varco	22	Ford													COR; 17													34th	208
2026	Monty Tipton	22	Ford																IRP; 30										34th	208
2026	Patrick Emerling	22	Ford																		NHA; 35								34th	208
2026	Jackson Macenko	22	Ford																			BRI; 36							34th	208

=== Truck No. 23 history ===
On October 7, 2026, it was announced that Jackson Lee would make his oval debut, driving the No. 23 at Phoenix.

==== Truck No. 23 results ====
Year	Driver	No.	Make	1	2	3	4	5	6	7	8	9	10	11	12	13	14	15	16	17	18	19	20	21	22	23	24	25	Owners	Pts
2026	Jackson Lee	23	Ford	DAY	ATL	STP	DAR	ROC	BRI	TEX	GLN	DOV	CLT	NSS	MCH	COR	LRP	NWS	IRP	RCH	NHA	BRI	KAN	CLT	PHO; 36	TAL	MAR	HOM	46th	1

=== Truck No. 27 history ===
On January 22, 2024 it was announced that RBR had acquired the owners points of the No. 16 of Hattori Racing Enterprises, the No. 22 of AM Racing, and the No. 30 of On Point Motorsports. On February 6, 2024 it was announced that Keith McGee would be driving 6 races in the No. 27 starting with Daytona.

==== Truck No. 27 results ====
Year	Driver	No.	Make	1	2	3	4	5	6	7	8	9	10	11	12	13	14	15	16	17	18	19	20	21	22	23	Owners	Pts
2024	Keith McGee	27	Ford	DAY; 31	ATL	LVS	BRI	COA	MAR	TEX	KAN	DAR	NWS	CLT	GTW	NSH; DNQ											48th	11
2024	Stephen Mallozzi	27	Ford														POC; 35	IRP	RCH	MLW	BRI	KAN	TAL	HOM			48th	11
2024	Josh Reaume	27	Ford																						MAR; Wth		48th	11
2024	Frankie Muniz	27	Ford																							PHO; 34	48th	11

=== Truck No. 32 history ===
Daniel Sasnett drove the No. 32 Toyota Tundra at World Wide Technology Raceway at Gateway in 2019, where he started 30th and finished 26th. The team entered for select events throughout the season. On July 26, 2019, Reaume Brothers Racing announced that Devin Dodson would make his NGOTS debut in the No. 34 Chevrolet at Eldora. The number was later changed to 32. For the rest of the season in the 32, Mason Massey, Daniel Sasnett, Bryant Barnhill, Devin Dodson and Gregory Rayl made one start apiece. Following the 2019 season the 32 team shut down.

==== Truck No. 32 results ====
Year	Driver	No.	Make	1	2	3	4	5	6	7	8	9	10	11	12	13	14	15	16	17	18	19	20	21	22	23	Owners	Pts
2019	Daniel Sasnett	32	Toyota	DAY	ATL	LVS	MAR	TEX	DOV	KAN	CLT	TEX	IOW	GTW; 26													46th	48
2019	Mason Massey	32	Toyota												CHI; 26	KEN											46th	48
2019	Bryant Barnhill	32	Chevy														POC; 27										46th	48
2019	Devin Dodson	32	Chevy															ELD; 30	MCH	BRI							46th	48
2019	Gregory Rayl	32	Toyota																		MSP; 28	LVS	TAL	MAR	PHO	HOM	46th	48

=== Truck No. 33 history ===
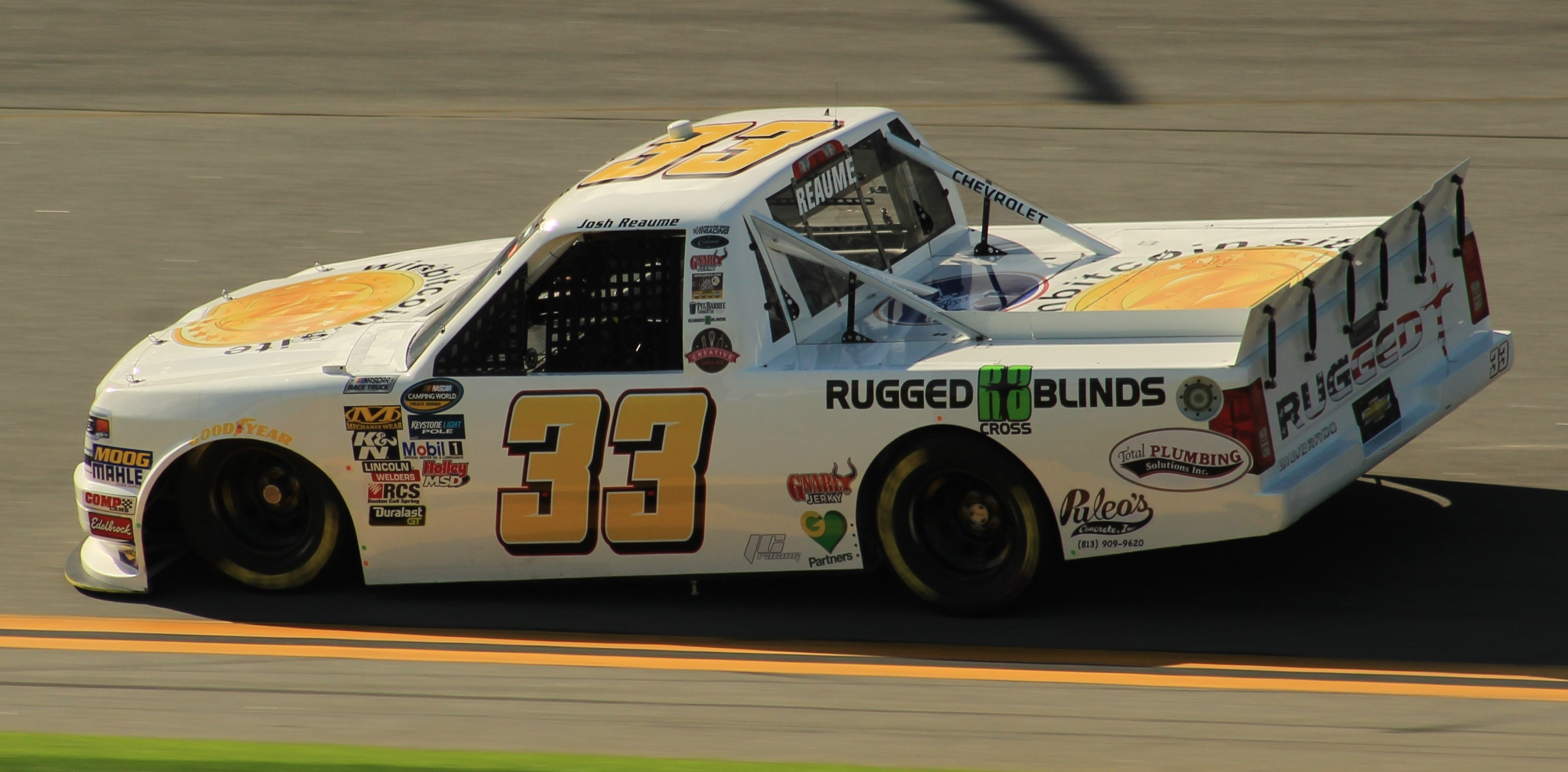
The No. 33 at Daytona International Speedway in 2018

On February 15, 2018, it was announced that a brand new team would open and field the No. 33 Chevrolet Silverado full-time for Josh Reaume. The team failed to qualify for the season opener at Daytona. They then qualified for the next seven races with a best finish of 23rd at Texas before another DNQ at Iowa. He for the next three races with a best finish of 22nd at Chicago. The team completed the rest of the season with Jason White, Robby Lyons, and Chad Finley with a best finish of 14th at Talladega with Lyons.

The team returned for the 2019 season with Josh Reaume at Daytona where he would pick up a sith-place finish, he would return at Atlanta and finish 30th. When the entry list for the Las Vegas race was released it was revealed YouTube personality MrBeast would sponsor Reaume although the truck was not run and ended up finishing 23rd. At Martinsville the next week Daniel Sasnett was tabbed to drive while also making his debut, he would end up finishing 30th. Reaume had originally planned to run the entire season, but could not find sponsorship and put other drivers in the No. 33 for some races. Experienced dirt racer Mike Marlar drove the No. 33 at that year's Eldora Speedway race. He finished fourth, marking the best finish for an RBR entry up to that point.

In 2020, Jason White, Gray Gaulding, Akinori Ogata, Bryant Barnhill, Josh Reaume and others drove the No. 33 car. White kicked off the season with a tenth in the NextEra Energy 250, but the team did not score another top-ten all season long. The team's only other top-twenty was an eighteenth at the Daytona Road Course, with Bryan Collyer behind the wheel, who was making his debut.

White returned in 2021 for the first two events of the season in the NextEra Energy 250 and the BrakeBest Select 159. NASCAR Xfinity Series driver Myatt Snider ran in the inaugural Pinty's Dirt Truck Race, finishing 22nd, and Cameron Lawrence made his series debut in the Texas Grand Prix. He was running in the top-ten and then suffered mechanical problems, dropping him to last, eight laps down. The No. 33’s best finish in 2021 ended up being an 18th-place finish with debutant Devon Rouse in the Corn Belt 150.

In 2022, Jason White ran the 33 truck in the NextEra Energy 250, finishing twentieth after a late crash with Kris Wright. Loris Hezemans would make his truck debut at Las Vegas. Chase Janes would drive at Martinsville. Mike Marlar would make a cameo appearance at Bristol Dirt. Mason Maggio would debut at Gateway. Jade Buford would race at Sonoma. Brayton Laster in for Knoxville. Japanese Kenko Miura would appear in Mid-Ohio.

In 2023, Mason Massey was scheduled to run the full NASCAR Craftsman Truck Series in the No. 33 Ford F-150, On April 1, at Texas Motor Speedway in the SpeedyCash.com 250, Massey had his best career Truck Series finish of eleventh place. He left the team seven races into the season. Multiple drivers such as Mason Maggio, Josh Reaume, Chase Janes, Derek Lemke, Memphis Villarreal, and Keith McGee filled up the rest of the schedule.

In 2024, it was announced that Lawless Alan would drive the No. 33 Ford full-time. At Talladega, Alan would put up a strong race, running towards the front and even contending for the win. Alan would received his best career finish with a 5th-place run.

On October 22, 2024, it was announced that Frankie Muniz would drive the No. 33 full-time for the 2025 season, replacing Lawless Alan. Prior to the race at Darlington, Muniz was injured in a fall from a ladder, sidelining him from the truck. Mason Maggio moved from the No. 22 to the No. 33 for the race. Maggio would also compete at Bristol, while Tyler Tomassi would drive the truck at New Hampshire.

On December 8, 2025, it was announced that Muniz will return to drive the No. 33 truck full-time for the 2026 season. Due to scheduling conflict, Muniz would miss the race at Watkins Glen. As the result, he would be replaced by Stephen Mallozzi. At New Hampshire, he would give up his seat for his teammate Luke Baldwin, who failed to qualify for the race. Muniz would miss two events at Kansas and Charlotte due to him pursuing a chance at the GT4 America championship. As the result, team owner Josh Reaume took over the driving duty.

==== Truck No. 33 results ====
Year	Driver	No.	Make	1	2	3	4	5	6	7	8	9	10	11	12	13	14	15	16	17	18	19	20	21	22	23	24	25	Owners	Pts
2018	Josh Reaume	33	Chevy	DAY; DNQ	ATL; 27		MAR; 25					IOW; DNQ	GTW; 18		KEN; 23		POC; 19	MCH; 20						TEX; DNQ					26th	234
2018	Josh Reaume	33	Toyota			LVS; 25		DOV; 25	KAN; 21	CLT; 24	TEX; 25			CHI; 21															26th	234
2018	Braden Mitchell	33	Toyota													ELD; DNQ													26th	234
2018	B. J. McLeod	33	Chevy																BRI; DNQ										26th	234
2018	Jason White	33	Chevy																	MSP; 23					PHO; 26				26th	234
2018	J. J. Yeley	33	Toyota																		LVS; DNQ								26th	234
2018	Robby Lyons	33	Chevy																			TAL; 14				HOM; 27			26th	234
2018	Chad Finley	33	Chevy																				MAR; 32						26th	234
2019	Josh Reaume	33	Chevy	DAY; 6		LVS; 23		TEX; 23			CLT; 28	TEX; 14		GTW; 23			POC; 20												21st	356
2019	Josh Reaume	33	Toyota		ATL; 30					KAN; 20									MCH; 18										21st	356
2019	Daniel Sasnett	33	Chevy				MAR; 30																						21st	356
2019	Ryan Sieg	33	Chevy						DOV; 16											BRI; 14									21st	356
2019	C. J. McLaughlin	33	Chevy										IOW; 23																21st	356
2019	Josh Bilicki	33	Chevy												CHI; 19											HOM; 30			21st	356
2019	Mason Massey	33	Chevy													KEN; 18						LVS; 28	TAL; 32						21st	356
2019	Mike Marlar	33	Toyota															ELD; 4											21st	356
2019	Dan Corcoran	33	Chevy																		MSP; 27								21st	356
2019	Dawson Cram	33	Chevy																					MAR; 13					21st	356
2019	Carson Ware	33	Toyota																						PHO; 30				21st	356
2020	Jason White	33	Chevy	DAY; 10																									28th	236
2020	Josh Reaume	33	Toyota		LVS; 27																								28th	236
2020	Jesse Iwuji	33	Chevy			CLT; 39																							28th	236
2020	Jesse Iwuji	33	Toyota						POC; 28					MCH; 22							LVS; 31								28th	236
2020	Gray Gaulding	33	Toyota				ATL; 34	HOM; 26																					28th	236
2020	Bryant Barnhill	33	Toyota							KEN; 33																			28th	236
2020	Bryant Barnhill	33	Chevy													DOV; 33	GTW; 26	DAR; 34											28th	236
2020	Akinori Ogata	33	Toyota								TEX; 25															PHO; 30			28th	236
2020	Kevin Donahue	33	Toyota									KAN; 38	KAN; 23																28th	236
2020	Bryan Collyer	33	Toyota												DRC; 18														28th	236
2020	Josh Bilicki	33	Toyota																RCH; 25				KAN; 28						28th	236
2020	Josh Reaume	33	Toyota																	BRI; 35		TAL; 23		TEX; 27					28th	236
2020	B. J. McLeod	33	Toyota																						MAR; 22				28th	236
2021	Jason White	33	Chevy	DAY; 20	DRC; 38																		TAL; 27						38th	177
2021	Jesse Iwuji	33	Chevy			LVS; 31				KAN; 38																			38th	177
2021	Jesse Iwuji	33	Toyota																					MAR; 30					38th	177
2021	Akinori Ogata	33	Toyota				ATL; 37						CLT; 28																38th	177
2021	Myatt Snider	33	Chevy					BRD; 22																					38th	177
2021	Keith McGee	33	Chevy						RCH; 30					TEX; 29															38th	177
2021	B. J. McLeod	33	Chevy								DAR; 32																		38th	177
2021	Cameron Lawrence	33	Chevy									COA; 36																	38th	177
2021	Josh Reaume	33	Chevy												NSH; DNQ	POC; 28													38th	177
2021	Josh Reaume	33	Toyota															GLN; 31											38th	177
2021	Devon Rouse	33	Chevy														KNX; 18												38th	177
2021	Armani Williams	33	Toyota																GTW; 21										38th	177
2021	Ryan Ellis	33	Toyota																	DAR; 37									38th	177
2021	C. J. McLaughlin	33	Toyota																		BRI; 26	LVS; 20							38th	177
2021	Chris Hacker	33	Toyota																						PHO; 27				38th	177
2022	Jason White	33	Toyota	DAY; 20																				TAL; DNQ					33rd	195
2022	Loris Hezemans	33	Toyota		LVS; 20																								33rd	195
2022	Chris Hacker	33	Toyota			ATL; 17											NSH; 29												33rd	195
2022	Chris Hacker	33	Chevy									TEX; 31											BRI; 33						33rd	195
2022	Will Rodgers	33	Toyota				COA; 21																						33rd	195
2022	Chase Janes	33	Chevy					MAR; 25																					33rd	195
2022	Mike Marlar	33	Toyota						BRD; 17																				33rd	195
2022	Josh Reaume	33	Toyota							DAR; 28	KAN; 30		CLT; 31						POC; 34	IRP; 33									33rd	195
2022	Mason Maggio	33	Chevy											GTW; 27															33rd	195
2022	Mason Maggio	33	Toyota																			KAN; 32							33rd	195
2022	Jade Buford	33	Toyota												SON; 33														33rd	195
2022	Brayton Laster	33	Chevy													KNX; 27													33rd	195
2022	Kenko Miura	33	Toyota															MOH; 33											33rd	195
2022	Nick Leitz	33	Chevy																		RCH; 36				HOM; 28				33rd	195
2022	Keith McGee	33	Chevy																							PHO; 34			33rd	195
2023	Mason Massey	33	Ford	DAY; 24	LVS; 27	ATL; 29	COA; DNQ	TEX; 11	BRD; 35	MAR; 33																			37th	148
2023	Mason Maggio	33	Ford								KAN; 27																		37th	148
2023	Josh Reaume	33	Ford									DAR; DNQ	NWS; DNQ	CLT; 29	GTW; Wth		MOH; DNQ	POC; 26		IRP; DNQ									37th	148
2023	Chase Janes	33	Ford													NSH; 26						KAN; 28							37th	148
2023	Derek Lemke	33	Ford																RCH; 33		MLW; 31								37th	148
2023	Memphis Villarreal	33	Ford																				BRI; 33		HOM; 29				37th	148
2023	Keith McGee	33	Ford																					TAL; DNQ		PHO; DNQ			37th	148
2024	Lawless Alan	33	Ford	DAY; 32	ATL; 12	LVS; 23	BRI; 27	COA; 33	MAR; 31	TEX; 11	KAN; 26	DAR; 12	NWS; 30	CLT; 30	GTW; 19	NSH; 24	POC; 32	IRP; 28	RCH; 18	MLW; 35	BRI; 24	KAN; 30	TAL; 5	HOM; 21	MAR; 23	PHO; 30			27th	306
2025	Frankie Muniz	33	Ford	DAY; 10	ATL; 26	LVS; 24	HOM; 24	MAR; 33	BRI; 31	CAR; 23	TEX; 25	KAN; 28	NWS; 29	CLT; 27	NSH; 32	MCH; 14	POC; 19	LRP; 28	IRP; 27	GLN; 27	RCH; 32					TAL; 20	MAR; 23	PHO; 19	27th	292
2025	Mason Maggio	33	Ford																			DAR; 26	BRI; 31		ROV; 28				27th	292
2025	Tyler Tomassi	33	Ford																					NHA; 27					27th	292
2026	Frankie Muniz	33	Ford	DAY; 16	ATL; 25	STP; 30	DAR; 18	ROC; 31	BRI; 35	TEX; 23		DOV; 24	CLT; 24	NSH; 24	MCH; 23	COR; 20	LRP; 26	NWS; 32	IRP; 29	RCH; 35	NHA; QL	BRI; 33			PHO; 33	TAL; 12	MAR; 25	HOM; 28	30th	271
2026	Stephen Mallozzi	33	Ford								GLN; 22																		30th	271
2026	Luke Baldwin	33	Ford																		NHA; 31								30th	271
2026	Josh Reaume	33	Ford																				KAN; 33	CLT; 27					30th	271

=== Truck No. 34 history ===
The team fielded this truck for Jeffrey Abbey at Eldora Speedway. Abbey qualified for the race and finished twelfth. The team fielded the No. 34 truck once again at Pocono with J. J. Yeley driving where he finished 31st. The truck returned to Michigan with B. J. McLeod where he finished 29th. The truck returned once again with debuting driver Jesse Iwuji in Canada in which he finished 25th.

The truck returned for most of the 2019 season.

In 2020, the truck was reduced to running only two races, one with Josh Bilicki and the other with Bryant Barnhill.

In 2021, the truck returned for the full season with Lawless Alan making his debut in the BrakeBest Select 159. Alan also would run the Toyota Tundra 225, Rackley Roofing 200, CRC Brakleen 150, Bully Hill Vineyards 150, UNOH 200 and the Chevrolet Silverado 250. Jake Griffin ran the dirt races. Chris Hacker made his Truck Series debut with the team at World Wide Technology Raceway in the Toyota 200. Dylan Lupton would drive for the rest of the season.

The No. 34 did not run in 2022, but returned for 2023

==== Truck No. 34 results ====
Year	Driver	No.	Make	1	2	3	4	5	6	7	8	9	10	11	12	13	14	15	16	17	18	19	20	21	22	23	Owners	Pts
2018	Jeffrey Abbey	34	Chevy	DAY	ATL	LVS	MAR	DOV	KAN	CLT	TEX	IOW	GTW	CHI	KEN	ELD; 17											45th	46
2018	J. J. Yeley	34	Chevy														POC; 31										45th	46
2018	B. J. McLeod	34	Chevy															MCH; 29	BRI								45th	46
2018	Jesse Iwuji	34	Chevy																	MSP; 25	LVS	TAL	MAR	TEX	PHO	HOM	45th	46
2019	Jason White	34	Chevy	DAY; DNQ	ATL																MSP; 20						24th	284
2019	Jesse Iwuji	34	Chevy			LVS; 26		TEX; 17							CHI; 22				MCH; 21			LVS; QL^{†}					24th	284
2019	Jesse Iwuji	34	Toyota																				TAL; 19				24th	284
2019	Daniel Sasnett	34	Chevy				MAR; Wth																				24th	284
2019	Josh Reaume	34	Chevy						DOV; 31																		24th	284
2019	Josh Reaume	34	Toyota																					MAR; 31		HOM; Wth	24th	284
2019	Josh Bilicki	34	Chevy							KAN; 18	CLT; DNQ					KEN; 20											24th	284
2019	Scott Stenzel	34	Chevy									TEX; 16															24th	284
2019	Mason Massey	34	Chevy										IOW; 21					ELD; 23									24th	284
2019	Bryant Barnhill	34	Chevy											GTW; 22													24th	284
2019	J. J. Yeley	34	Toyota																	BRI; 31							24th	284
2019	Justin Johnson	34	Toyota																			LVS; 23					24th	284
2019	Kyle Plott	34	Toyota																						PHO; 25		24th	284
2020	Josh Reaume	34	Toyota	DAY; Wth																							45th	5
2020	Josh Bilicki	34	Chevy		LVS; 32																						45th	5
2020	Bryant Barnhill	34	Toyota			CLT; DNQ	ATL; DNQ	POC	KEN	TEX	KAN	KAN	MCH	DRC	DOV	GTW	DAR	RCH	BRI	LVS	TAL	KAN	TEX	MAR	PHO		45th	5
2020	Bryant Barnhill	34	Chevy					HOM; 38																			45th	5
2021	Jesse Iwuji	34	Toyota	DAY; DNQ										TEX; 28													30th	255
2021	Lawless Alan	34	Toyota		DAY; 36							COA; 23			NSH; 34	POC; 20		GLN; 32									30th	255
2021	B. J. McLeod	34	Toyota			LVS; 26																					30th	255
2021	Ryan Ellis	34	Chevy				ATL; 34																				30th	255
2021	Jake Griffin	34	Chevy					BRI; 29									KNX; 12										30th	255
2021	Josh Reaume	34	Toyota						RCH; 33											DAR; 25	BRI; 40			MAR; 34			30th	255
2021	C. J. McLaughlin	34	Toyota							KAN; 34			CLT; 27														30th	255
2021	Akinori Ogata	34	Toyota								DAR; 34																30th	255
2021	Chris Hacker	34	Toyota																GTW; 27								30th	255
2021	Dylan Lupton	34	Toyota																			LVS; 21	TAL; 26				30th	255
2021	Will Rodgers	34	Toyota																						PHO; 22		30th	255
2023	Jason White	34	Toyota	DAY; 21																							40th	43
2023	Josh Reaume	34	Ford		LVS; 35				BRD; DNQ	MAR; Wth	KAN	DAR	NWS						RCH; 36	IRP	MLW	KAN	BRI	TAL	HOM	PHO	40th	43
2023	Keith McGee	34	Ford			ATL; 36		TEX; 33						CLT; 36													40th	43
2023	Mason Filippi	34	Ford				COA; 26																				40th	43
2023	Stephen Mallozzi	34	Ford												GTW; 31												40th	43
2023	Caleb Costner	34	Ford														MOH; DNQ	POC									40th	43
2023	Mason Maggio	34	Ford													NSH; 20											40th	43

=== Truck No. 43 history ===
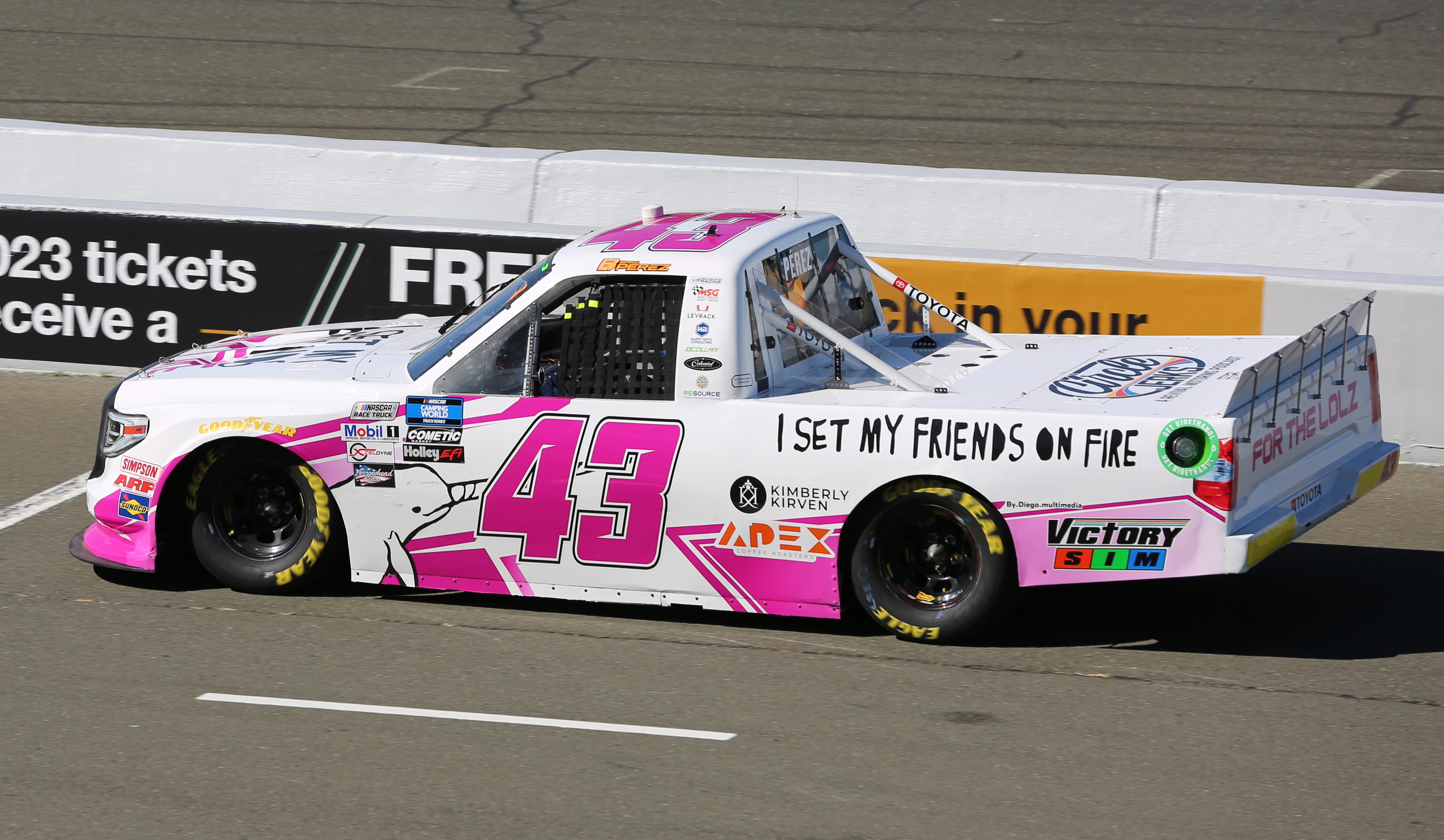
Brad Perez in the No. 43 at Sonoma Raceway in 2022

On February 10, 2022, it was announced that the team would make a collaboration with GMS Racing fielding the No. 43 Chevrolet Silverado for Thad Moffitt, running a paint scheme that pays tribute to Richard Petty's 1992 retirement season. Josh Williams Motorsports ARCA driver Brad Perez made his debut at COTA. African-American Blake Lothian made his debut at Martinsville. Devon Rouse would return in Knoxville. Nick Leitz made his debut in Nashville. Stephen Mallozzi would make his debut at Mid-Ohio.

==== Truck No. 43 results ====
Year	Driver	No.	Make	1	2	3	4	5	6	7	8	9	10	11	12	13	14	15	16	17	18	19	20	21	22	23	Owners	Pts
2022	Thad Moffitt	43	Chevy	DAY; 18	LVS; 29	ATL; 32																					37th	148
2022	Brad Perez	43	Toyota				COA; 20								SON; 22													148
2022	Blake Lothian	43	Toyota					MAR; 28						GTW; DNQ														148
2022	Blake Lothian	43	Chevy																	IRP; 35								148
2022	Keith McGee	43	Chevy						BRD; 34																			148
2022	Keith McGee	43	Toyota										CLT; 33															148
2022	Akinori Ogata	43	Toyota							DAR; 36																		148
2022	Jesse Iwuji	43	Chevy								KAN; 35																	148
2022	Armani Williams	43	Toyota									TEX; DNQ							POC; 31									148
2022	Armani Williams	43	Chevy																			KAN; 35						148
2022	Devon Rouse	43	Chevy													KNX; 30												148
2022	Nick Leitz	43	Chevy														NSH; 26											148
2022	Stephen Mallozzi	43	Toyota															MOH; 22										148
2022	Mason Maggio	43	Toyota																		RCH; 33				HOM; 32			148
2022	Josh Reaume	43	Toyota																				BRI; 35					148
2022	Natalie Decker	43	Toyota																					TAL; DNQ				148
2022	Chris Hacker	43	Toyota																							PHO; 26		148

== ARCA Menards Series ==
=== Car No. 33 history ===
In 2024, Reaume debuted in the ARCA Menards Series. They first fielded the No. 33 car for Lawless Alan at Kansas. Alan would also drive for the team at Charlotte, IRP, Milwaukee, Bristol, and Kansas. The team also competed at Michigan International Speedway, with Frankie Muniz driving the car.

==== Car No. 33 results ====
Year	Driver	No.	Make	1	2	3	4	5	6	7	8	9	10	11	12	13	14	15	16	17	18	19	20	AMSC	Pts
2024	Lawless Alan	33	Ford	DAY	PHO	TAL	DOV	KAN; 11	CLT; 8	IOW	MOH	BLN	IRP; 23	SLM	ELK			MLW; 5	DSF	GLN	BRI; 9	KAN; 8	TOL	22nd	232
2024	Frankie Muniz	33	Ford													MCH; 12	ISF							22nd	232

== ARCA Menards Series East ==
=== Car No. 33 history ===
In 2024, Reaume debuted in the ARCA Menards Series East. They fielded the No. 33 car for Lawless Alan at IRP.

==== Car No. 33 results ====
Year	Driver	No.	Make	1	2	3	4	5	6	7	8	AMSEC	Pts
2024	Lawless Alan	33	Ford	FIF	DOV	NSV	FRS	IOW	IRP; 23	MLW; 5	BRI; 9	24th	95

== Strike Mamba Racing ==
Strike Mamba Racing
- Owner: Jonathan Reaume
- Series: ARCA Menards Series; ARCA Menards Series West
- Race drivers: ARCA Menards Series: 51. Tyler Tomassi (part-time); 72. Cody Dennison (part-time); ARCA Menards Series West: 51. Austin Varco, Tyler Tomassi, Scotty Millan, Cassten Everidge; 72. Cody Dennison, Memphis Villarreal, Josiah Reaume, Tyler Tomassi, Sage Karam
- Manufacturer: Chevrolet
- Opened: 2025

Career
- Debut: ARCA Menards Series: 2025 General Tire 150 (Phoenix); ARCA Menards Series West: 2025 West Coast Stock Car Motorsports Hall of Fame 150 (Kern County)
- Latest race: ARCA Menards Series West: 2025 General Tire 150 (Phoenix); ARCA Menards Series West: 2026 NAPA Auto Parts 150 (Bakersfield)
- Races competed: Total: 27; ARCA Menards Series: 2 ARCA Menards Series West: 25
- Drivers' Championships: Total: 0 ARCA Menards Series: 0 ARCA Menards Series West: 0
- Race victories: Total: 0 ARCA Menards Series: 0 ARCA Menards Series West: 0
- Pole positions: Total: 0 ARCA Menards Series: 0 ARCA Menards Series West: 0

Strike Mamba Racing is an American stock car racing team that competes in the ARCA Menards Series West. The team was founded in 2025 and currently fields the No. 51 Chevrolet SS full-time for multiple drivers and the No. 72 Chevrolet SS full-time for multiple drivers.

=== Car No. 51 history ===
In 2025, SMR fielded the No. 51 for Blake Lothian at Phoenix as part of the west series double-header. He finished seventeenth.

In 2026, Tyler Tomassi drove the No. 51 at Phoenix as part of the west series double-header. He finished 33rd.

==== Car No. 51 results ====
Year	Driver	No.	Make	1	2	3	4	5	6	7	8	9	10	11	12	13	14	15	16	17	18	19	20	Owners	Pts
2025	Blake Lothian	51	Chevy	DAY	PHO; 17	TAL	KAN	CLT	MCH	BLN	ELK	LRP	DOV	IRP	IOW	GLN	ISF	MAD	DSF	BRI	SLM	KAN	TOL	63rd	27
2026	Tyler Tomassi	51	Chevy	DAY	PHO; 33	KAN	TAL	GLN	TOL	MCH	POC	BER	ELK	CHI	LRP	IRP	IOW	ISF	MAD	DSF	SLM	BRI	KAN	82nd	11

=== Car No. 72 history ===
In 2025, SMR fielded the No. 72 for owner Jonathan Reaume at Phoenix as part of the west series double-header. He finished 25th.

In 2026, Cody Dennison drove the No. 72 at Phoenix as part of the west series double-header. He finished 19th.

==== Car No. 72 results ====
Year	Driver	No.	Make	1	2	3	4	5	6	7	8	9	10	11	12	13	14	15	16	17	18	19	20	Owners	Pts
2025	Jonathan Reaume	72	Chevy	DAY	PHO; 25	TAL	KAN	CLT	MCH	BLN	ELK	LRP	DOV	IRP	IOW	GLN	ISF	MAD	DSF	BRI	SLM	KAN	TOL	69th	19
2026	Cody Dennison	72	Chevy	DAY	PHO; 19	KAN	TAL	GLN	TOL	MCH	POC	BER	ELK	CHI	LRP	IRP	IOW	ISF	MAD	DSF	SLM	BRI	KAN	69th	25

=== Car No. 51 history ===
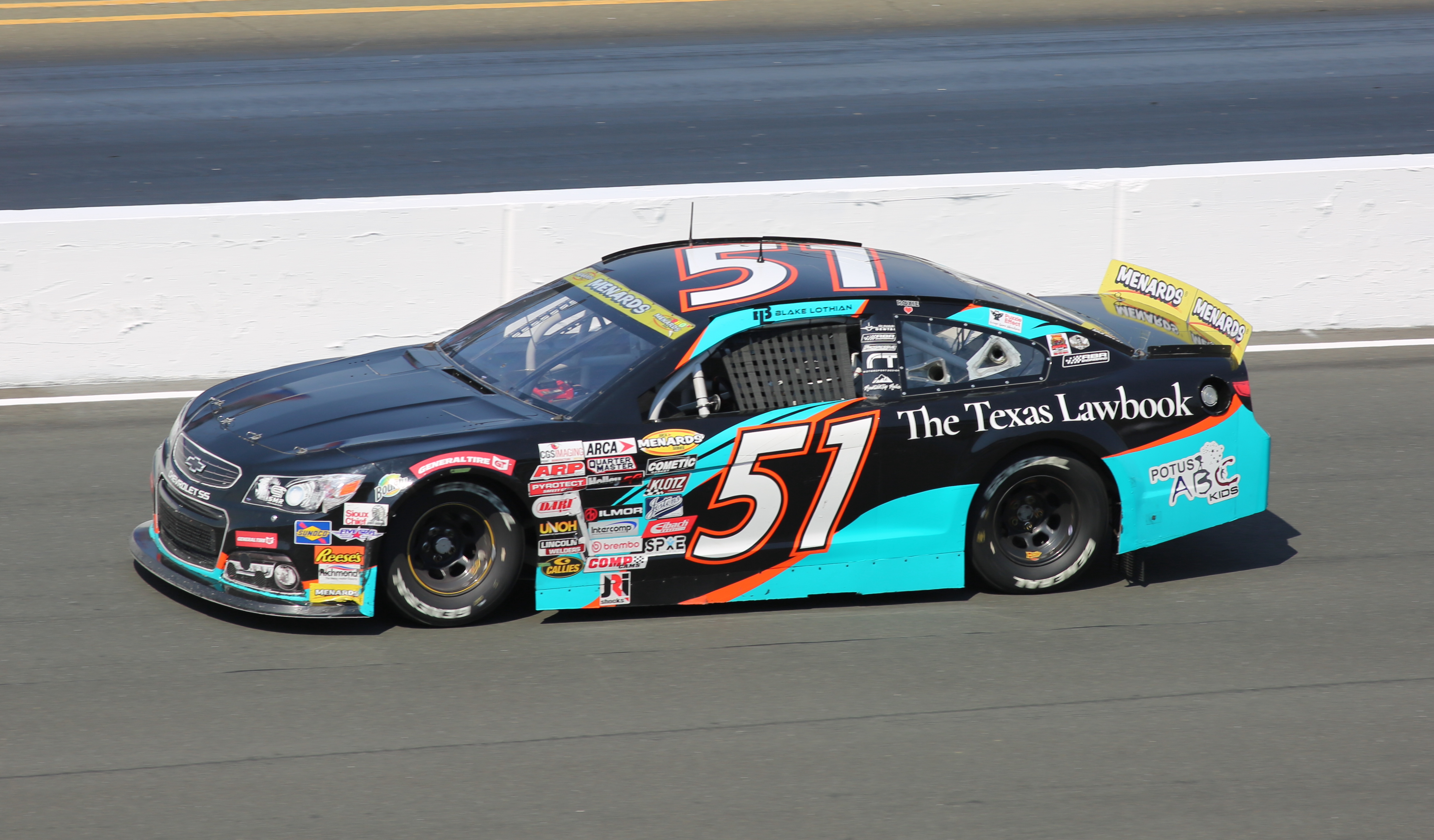
Blake Lothian in the No. 51 car at Sonoma Raceway in 2025

On December 11, 2024, it was announced that Blake Lothian would run full-time in the No. 51 car throughout the 2025 season.

In 2026, Austin Varco would drive the No. 51 at Kern Raceway and Portland. Tyler Tomassi would drive the No. 51 for multiple races starting at Phoenix. Scotty Millan would attempt to make his debut at Colorado in the No. 51 car. He would also drive the No. 51 at Las Vegas Motor Speedway Bullring. Cassten Everidge would drive the No. 51 at fall Phoenix race.

==== Car No. 51 results ====
Year	Driver	No.	Make	1	2	3	4	5	6	7	8	9	10	11	12	13	Owners	Pts
2025	Blake Lothian	51	Chevy	KER; 11	PHO; 17	TUC; 9	CNS; 8	KER; 9	SON; 19	TRI; 10	PIR; 17	AAS; 10	MAD; 9	LVS; 8	PHO; 16		6th	457
2026	Austin Varco	51	Chevy	KER; 22							PIR; 17						-*	-*
2026	Tyler Tomassi	51	Chevy		PHO; 33	TUC; 14	SHA; 10		TRI; 9	SON; 16		AAS; 11	MAD; 14			KER; 13	-*	-*
2026	Scotty Millan	51	Chevy					CNS; 15						LVS; 21			-*	-*
2026	Cassten Everidge	51	Chevy												PHO; 19		-*	-*

=== Car No. 72 history ===
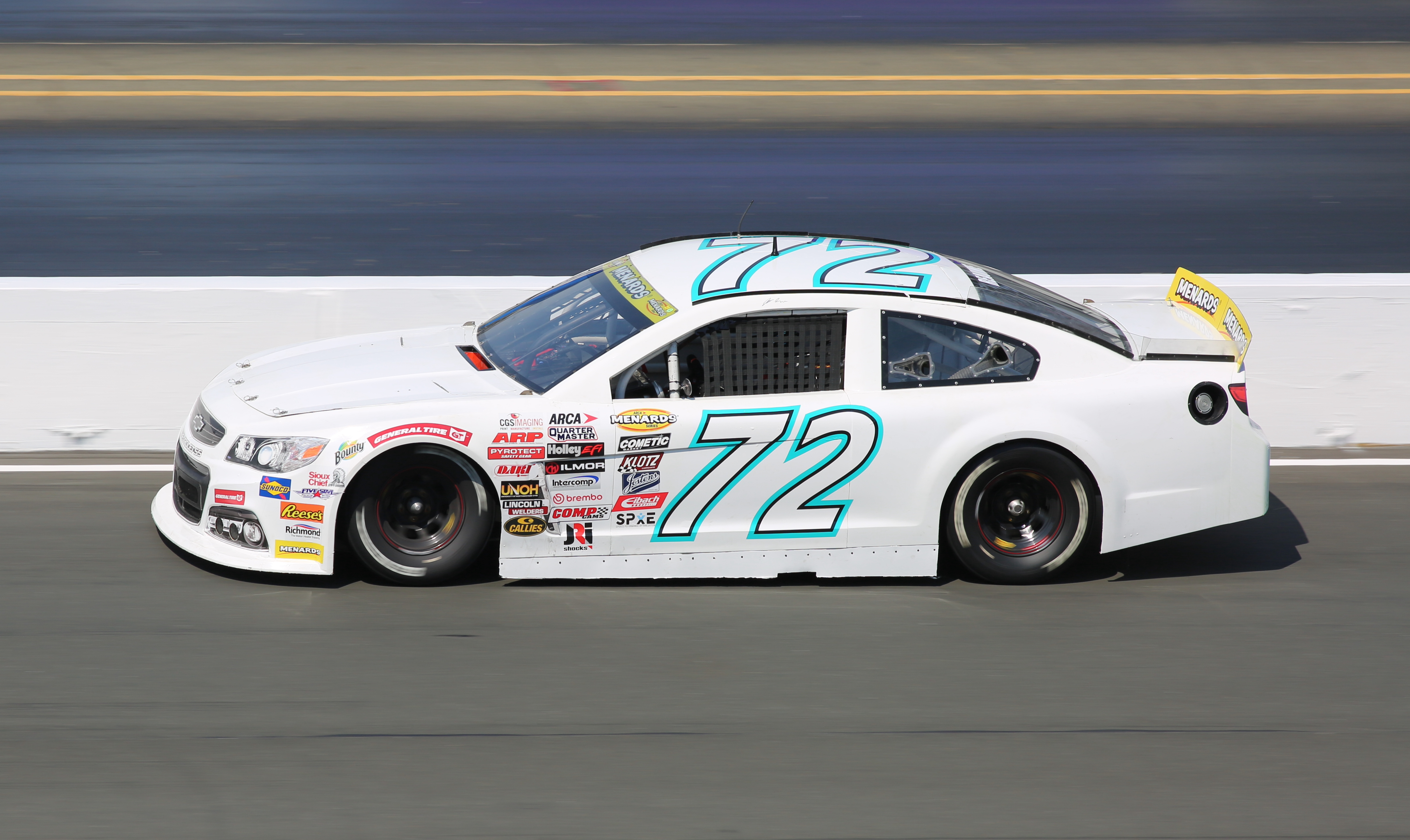
Jonathan Reaume in the No. 72 car at Sonoma Raceway in 2025

In 2024, RBR was scheduled to debut in the ARCA Menards Series West, fielding a No. 72 car for Jonathan Reaume (Josh Reaume's older brother) in the season-finale at Phoenix, but withdrew.

On January 19, 2025, it was announced that Cody Dennison would run the No. 72 car for the 2025 season opener via an X post. In March of that year, it was revealed the team owner Jonathan Reaume would attempt to make his debut at Phoenix in the No. 72. In May, it was announced that Holly Clark would attempt to make her debut at her home race at Colorado in the No. 72. In August, it was announced that Austin Varco would drive the No. 72 at Portland.

In 2026, Dennison would drive the No. 72 at Kern Raceway and Phoenix. Memphis Villarreal would drive the No. 72 at Tucson. Josiah Reaume would drive the No. 72 at Shasta, Tri-City, Portland, Roseville, and Madera. Tyler Tomassi would drive the No. 72 at Colorado and Las Vegas Motor Speedway Bullring. Sage Karam would drive the No. 72 at Sonoma.

==== Car No. 72 results ====
Year	Driver	No.	Make	1	2	3	4	5	6	7	8	9	10	11	12	13	Owners	Pts
2024	Jonathan Reaume	72	Chevy	PHO	KER	PIR	SON	IRW	IRW	SHA	TRI	MAD	AAS	KER	PHO; Wth		N/A	0
2025	Cody Dennison	72	Chevy	KER; 8		TUC; 10							MAD; 13	LVS; 20	PHO; 22		7th	435
2025	Jonathan Reaume	72	Chevy		PHO; 25			KER; 8	SON; 16	TRI; 12		AAS; 14					7th	435
2025	Holly Clark	72	Chevy				CNS; 10										7th	435
2025	Austin Varco	72	Chevy								PIR; 13						7th	435
2026	Cody Dennison	72	Chevy	KER; 14	PHO; 19										PHO; 21	KER; 19	-*	-*
2026	Memphis Villarreal	72	Chevy			TUC; 9											-*	-*
2026	Josiah Reaume	72	Chevy				SHA; 16		TRI; 10		PIR; 26	AAS; 9	MAD; 17				-*	-*
2026	Tyler Tomassi	72	Chevy					CNS; 14						LVS; 7			-*	-*
2026	Sage Karam	72	Chevy							SON; 13							-*	-*
