= Jackson Macenko =

American racing driver (born 2004)

- Born: February 18, 2004 (age 22); Cincinnati, Ohio, U.S.

NASCAR FedEx Freight Truck Series career
- 2 races run over 1 year
- 2026 position: 93rd
- Best finish: 93rd (2026)
- First race: 2026 TSport 200 (IRP)
- Last race: 2026 UNOH 250 (Bristol)
Wins	Top tens	Poles
0	0	0
- Statistics up to date as of November 6, 2026.

Jackson Macenko (born February 18, 2004) is an American professional stock car racing driver. He last competed part-time in the NASCAR Craftsman Truck Series, driving the driving the No. 2/22 Ford F-150 for Team Reaume.

== Racing career ==
Macenko started his career in go-karts at Lawrenceburg Motorcycle Speedway before moving to race in the USSA Kenyon Midget Series, where he earned Rookie of the Year honors with the series in 2019, and won seven features, as well as a second place points finish in 2022.

In 2023, Macenko made his debut in the 500 Sprint Car Tour, driving for Brad Haynes Racing, where he finished seventh in the final points standings with one top-five and eight top-ten finishes. He then finished fifth in points for the following two years. It was also during this time that he made select starts in the USAC Silver Crown Series. In 2026, he remained with Brad Haynes Racing. He got his first win in the series at Winchester Speedway.

=== NASCAR ===
==== Craftsman Truck Series ====
On June 30, 2026, it was revealed that Macenko would attempt to make his debut in the NASCAR Craftsman Truck Series at Lucas Oil Indianapolis Raceway Park, driving the No. 2 Ford for Team Reaume. He started 31st but finished in 36th due to mechanical issues.

== Personal life ==
Macenko is a former graduate of the University of Cincinnati.

== Motorsports career results ==
=== Stock car career summary ===
Season	Series	Team	Races	Wins	Top 5	Top 10	Points	Position
2026	NASCAR Craftsman Truck Series	Team Reaume	2	0	0	0	2	93rd

=== NASCAR ===
(key) (Bold – Pole position awarded by qualifying time. Italics – Pole position earned by points standings or practice time. * – Most laps led.)

==== Craftsman Truck Series ====
NASCAR Craftsman Truck Series results
Year	Team	No.	Make	1	2	3	4	5	6	7	8	9	10	11	12	13	14	15	16	17	18	19	20	21	22	23	24	25	NCTC	Pts	Ref
2026	Team Reaume	2	Ford	DAY	ATL	STP	DAR	ROC	BRI	TEX	GLN	DOV	CLT	NSH	MCH	COR	LRP	NWS	IRP; 36	RCH	NHA								93rd	2	
2026	Team Reaume	22	Ford																			BRI; 36	KAN	CLT	PHO	TAL	MAR	HOM	93rd	2	

^{*} Season still in progress
^{1} Ineligible for series points
