= 2025 Portland 112 =

8th race of the 2025 ARCA Menards Series West

Race details
- Race 8 of 12 of the 2025 ARCA Menards Series West
- Date: August 29, 2025
- Official name: 5th Annual Portland 112
- Location: Portland International Raceway in Portland, Oregon
- Course: Permanent racing facility
- Course length: 1.967 miles (3.166 km)
- Distance: 57 laps, 112 mi (181 km)
- Scheduled distance: 57 laps, 112 mi (181 km)
- Average speed: 74.943 mph (120.609 km/h)

Pole position
Driver	William Sawalich	Joe Gibbs Racing
- Time: 1:15.438

Most laps led
Driver	William Sawalich	Joe Gibbs Racing
- Laps: 42

Winner
No. 18	William Sawalich	Joe Gibbs Racing

Television in the United States
- Network: FloRacing
- Announcers: Charles Krall

Radio in the United States
- Radio: MRN

The 2025 Portland 112 was the 8th stock car race of the 2025 ARCA Menards Series West season, and the 5th running of the event. The race was held on Friday, August 29, 2025, at Portland International Raceway in Portland, Oregon, a 1.967 mile (3.166 km) permanent road course. The race took the scheduled 57 laps to complete. In an exciting battle between William Sawalich and Thomas Annunziata, Sawalich, driving for Joe Gibbs Racing, would come out on top, making an aggressive move on Annunziata with four laps to go and led the remainder of the race to earn his fifth career ARCA Menards Series West win, and his second of the season. Annunziata settled for second, and Alon Day, driving for Venturini Motorsports, would round out the podium in third.

This was also Greg Biffle's final NASCAR sanctioned race, as he would be killed in a plane crash 4 months later.

== Report ==
=== Background ===
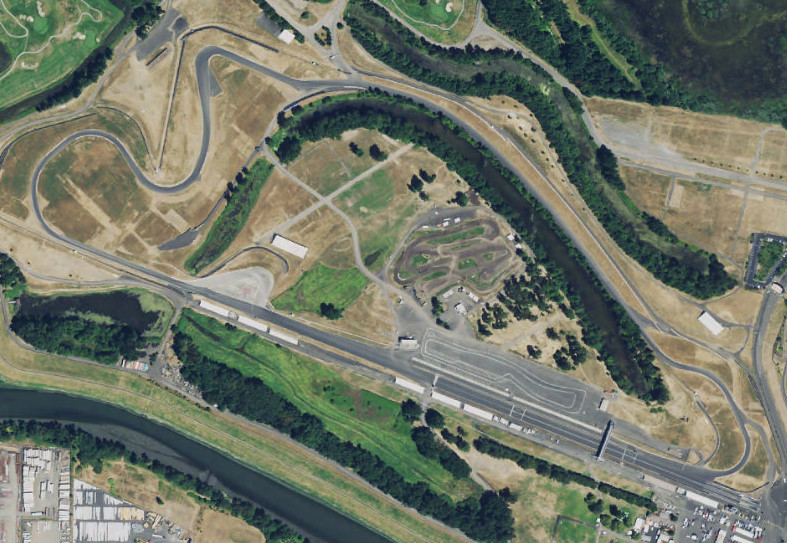
Portland International Raceway, the track where the race will be held.

Portland International Raceway (PIR) is a motorsport facility in Portland in the U.S. state of Oregon. It is part of the Delta Park complex on the former site of Vanport, just south of the Columbia River. It lies west of the Delta Park/Vanport light rail station and less than a mile west of Interstate 5.

The track hosts the IndyCar Series, Formula E, ICSCC and SCCA and OMRRA road racing, the ARCA Menards Series West, the NASCAR Xfinity Series, and SCCA autocross events. Additionally, the PIR grounds are host to OBRA (Oregon Bicycle Racing Association) bicycling races on the track and the surrounding grounds. The facility includes a dragstrip and a motocross track.

=== Entry list ===
- (R) denotes rookie driver.

#	Driver	Team	Make
1	Robbie Kennealy (R)	Jan's Towing Racing	Ford
3	Fernando Navarette	Central Coast Racing	Toyota
05	David Smith	Shockwave Motorsports	Toyota
5	Eric Johnson Jr.	Jerry Pitts Racing	Toyota
6	Caleb Shrader	Jerry Pitts Racing	Ford
13	Tanner Reif	Central Coast Racing	Ford
14	Davey Magras	Davey Magras Racing	Chevrolet
18	William Sawalich	Joe Gibbs Racing	Toyota
19	Christian Eckes	Bill McAnally Racing	Chevrolet
24	Greg Biffle	Sigma Performance Services	Chevrolet
25	Alon Day	Venturini Motorsports	Toyota
27	Bobby Hillis Jr.	Fierce Creature Racing	Chevrolet
32	Dale Quarterley	1/4 Ley Racing	Chevrolet
50	Trevor Huddleston	High Point Racing	Ford
51	Blake Lothian (R)	Strike Mamba Racing	Chevrolet
70	Thomas Annunziata	Nitro Motorsports	Toyota
71	Kyle Keller	Jan's Towing Racing	Ford
72	Austin Varco	Strike Mamba Racing	Chevrolet
Official entry list

== Practice ==
The first and only practice session is scheduled to be held on Friday, August 29, at 11:00 AM PST, and would last for 45 minutes. William Sawalich, driving for Joe Gibbs Racing, would set the fastest time in the session, with a lap of 1:15.198, and a speed of 94.311 mph (151.779 km/h).

Pos.	#	Driver	Team	Make	Time	Speed
1	18	William Sawalich	Joe Gibbs Racing	Toyota	1:15.198	94.311
2	70	Thomas Annunziata	Nitro Motorsports	Toyota	1:15.488	93.949
3	25	Alon Day	Venturini Motorsports	Toyota	1:15.848	93.503
Full practice results

== Qualifying ==
Qualifying was held on Friday, August 29, at 12:20 PM PST. The qualifying procedure used is a multi-car, multi-lap based system. All drivers will be on track for a 20-minute timed session, and whoever sets the fastest time in the session will win the pole.

William Sawalich, driving for Joe Gibbs Racing, would score the pole for the race, with a lap of 1:15.438, and a speed of 94.011 mph (151.296 km/h).

=== Qualifying results ===
Pos.	#	Driver	Team	Make	Time	Speed
1	18	William Sawalich	Joe Gibbs Racing	Toyota	1:15.438	94.011
2	70	Thomas Annunziata	Nitro Motorsports	Toyota	1:15.486	93.951
3	25	Alon Day	Venturini Motorsports	Toyota	1:15.696	93.691
4	3	Fernando Navarette	Central Coast Racing	Toyota	1:16.958	92.154
5	6	Caleb Shrader	Jerry Pitts Racing	Ford	1:16.971	92.139
6	13	Tanner Reif	Central Coast Racing	Ford	1:17.009	92.093
7	71	Kyle Keller	Jan's Towing Racing	Ford	1:17.215	91.847
8	24	Greg Biffle	Sigma Performance Services	Chevrolet	1:17.307	91.738
9	1	Robbie Kennealy (R)	Jan's Towing Racing	Ford	1:17.618	91.371
10	5	Eric Johnson Jr.	Jerry Pitts Racing	Toyota	1:17.802	91.154
11	72	Austin Varco	Strike Mamba Racing	Chevrolet	1:18.853	89.940
12	51	Blake Lothian (R)	Strike Mamba Racing	Chevrolet	1:19.789	88.884
13	14	Davey Magras	Davey Magras Racing	Chevrolet	1:20.870	87.696
14	05	David Smith	Shockwave Motorsports	Toyota	1:23.711	84.720
15	19	Christian Eckes	Bill McAnally Racing	Chevrolet	–	–
16	27	Bobby Hillis Jr.	Fierce Creature Racing	Chevrolet	–	–
17	32	Dale Quarterley	1/4 Ley Racing	Chevrolet	–	–
18	50	Trevor Huddleston	High Point Racing	Ford	–	–
Official qualifying results

== Race results ==
Fin	St	#	Driver	Team	Make	Laps	Led	Status	Pts
1	1	18	William Sawalich	Joe Gibbs Racing	Toyota	57	42	Running	49
2	2	70	Thomas Annunziata	Nitro Motorsports	Toyota	57	15	Running	43
3	3	25	Alon Day	Venturini Motorsports	Toyota	57	0	Running	41
4	8	24	Greg Biffle	Sigma Performance Services	Chevrolet	57	0	Running	40
5	15	50	Trevor Huddleston	High Point Racing	Ford	57	0	Running	39
6	7	71	Kyle Keller	Jan's Towing Racing	Ford	57	0	Running	38
7	17	32	Dale Quarterley	1/4 Ley Racing	Chevrolet	57	0	Running	37
8	5	6	Caleb Shrader	Jerry Pitts Racing	Ford	57	0	Running	36
9	10	5	Eric Johnson Jr.	Jerry Pitts Racing	Toyota	57	0	Running	35
10	6	13	Tanner Reif	Central Coast Racing	Toyota	57	0	Running	34
11	13	14	Davey Magras	Davey Magras Racing	Chevrolet	56	0	Running	33
12	9	1	Robbie Kennealy (R)	Jan's Towing Racing	Ford	56	0	Running	32
13	11	72	Austin Varco	Strike Mamba Racing	Chevrolet	56	0	Running	31
14	16	19	Christian Eckes	Bill McAnally Racing	Chevrolet	55	0	Running	30
15	14	05	David Smith	Shockwave Motorsports	Toyota	53	0	Running	29
16	4	3	Fernando Navarette	Central Coast Racing	Toyota	37	0	Mechanical	28
17	12	51	Blake Lothian (R)	Strike Mamba Racing	Chevrolet	6	0	Transmission	27
18	18	27	Bobby Hillis Jr.	Fierce Creature Racing	Chevrolet	4	0	Carburetor	26
Official race results

== Standings after the race ==
Drivers' Championship standings

Pos	Driver	Points
1	Trevor Huddleston	377
2	Kyle Keller	369 (–8)
3	Tanner Reif	357 (–20)
4	Eric Johnson Jr.	343 (–34)
5	Robbie Kennealy	336 (–41)
6	Blake Lothian	302 (–75)
7	David Smith	283 (–94)
8	Jake Bollman	190 (–187)
9	Todd Souza	163 (–214)
10	Jonathan Reaume	115 (–262)

- Note: Only the first 10 positions are included for the driver standings.

Previous race: 2025 NAPA Auto Care 150	ARCA Menards Series West; 2025 season	Next race: 2025 NAPA Auto Parts 150 (Roseville)
