= Daniel Sasnett =

American auto racing driver

- Born: Daniel D. Sasnett; March 20, 1978 (age 48); Auburndale, Florida, U.S.

NASCAR FedEx Freight Truck Series career
- 3 races run over 1 year
- 2019 position: 68th
- Best finish: 68th (2019)
- First race: 2019 TruNorth Global 250 (Martinsville)
- Last race: 2019 Gander RV 150 (Pocono)
Wins	Top tens	Poles
0	0	0

ARCA Menards Series career
- 2 races run over 2 years
- Best finish: 102nd (2018)
- First race: 2018 Lucas Oil 200 (Daytona)
- Last race: 2026 Atlas 200 (Madison)
Wins	Top tens	Poles
0	0	0
- Statistics up to date as of August 28, 2026.

Daniel D. Sasnett (born March 20, 1978) is an American professional stock car racing driver. He last competed part-time in the ARCA Menards Series, driving the No. 06 Ford for Wayne Peterson Racing. He has previously competed in the NASCAR Gander Outdoors Truck Series.

== Racing career ==
=== NASCAR Gander Outdoors Truck Series ===
Sasnett made his debut in the NASCAR Gander Outdoors Truck Series in the 2019 TruNorth Global 250 at Martinsville Speedway, driving the No. 33 Chevrolet Silverado for Reaume Brothers Racing, where he finished in 30th. He raced at Gateway, finishing in 26th.

=== ARCA Menards Series ===
Sasnett made his ARCA debut at Daytona in 2018 driving the No. 33 Chevrolet for Win-Tron Racing. Before this, he was an instructor for the Richard Petty Driving Experience at the Daytona International Speedway.

In 2026, it was revealed that Sasnett would return to the now renamed ARCA Menards Series at Madison International Speedway, driving the No. 06 Ford for Wayne Peterson Racing.

== Motorsports career results ==
=== NASCAR ===
(key) (Bold – Pole position awarded by qualifying time. Italics – Pole position earned by points standings or practice time. * – Most laps led.)

==== Gander Outdoors Truck Series ====
NASCAR Gander Outdoors Truck Series results
Year	Team	No.	Make	1	2	3	4	5	6	7	8	9	10	11	12	13	14	15	16	17	18	19	20	21	22	23	NGOTC	Pts	Ref
2019	Reaume Brothers Racing	33	Chevy	DAY	ATL	LVS	MAR; 30	TEX	DOV	KAN	CLT	TEX	IOW														68th	26	
2019	Reaume Brothers Racing	32	Toyota											GTW; 26	CHI	KEN											68th	26	
2019	JJC Racing	0	Chevy														POC; 29	ELD	MCH; DNQ	BRI	MSP	LVS	TAL	MAR	PHO	HOM	68th	26	

=== ARCA Menards Series ===
(key) (Bold – Pole position awarded by qualifying time. Italics – Pole position earned by points standings or practice time. * – Most laps led.)

ARCA Menards Series results
Year	Team	No.	Make	1	2	3	4	5	6	7	8	9	10	11	12	13	14	15	16	17	18	19	20	AMSC	Pts	Ref
2018	Win-Tron Racing	33	Chevy	DAY; 34	NSH	SLM	TAL	TOL	CLT	POC	MCH	MAD	GTW	CHI	IOW	ELK	POC	ISF	BLN	DSF	SLM	IRP	KAN	102nd	60	
2026	Wayne Peterson Racing	06	Ford	DAY	PHO	KAN	TAL	GLN	TOL	MCH	POC	BER	ELK	CHI	LRP	IRP	IOW	ISF	MAD; 14	DSF	SLM	BRI	KAN	103rd	30	

^{*} Season still in progress
^{1} Ineligible for series points
