= Jonathan Reaume =

Canadian racing driver and team owner (born 1989)

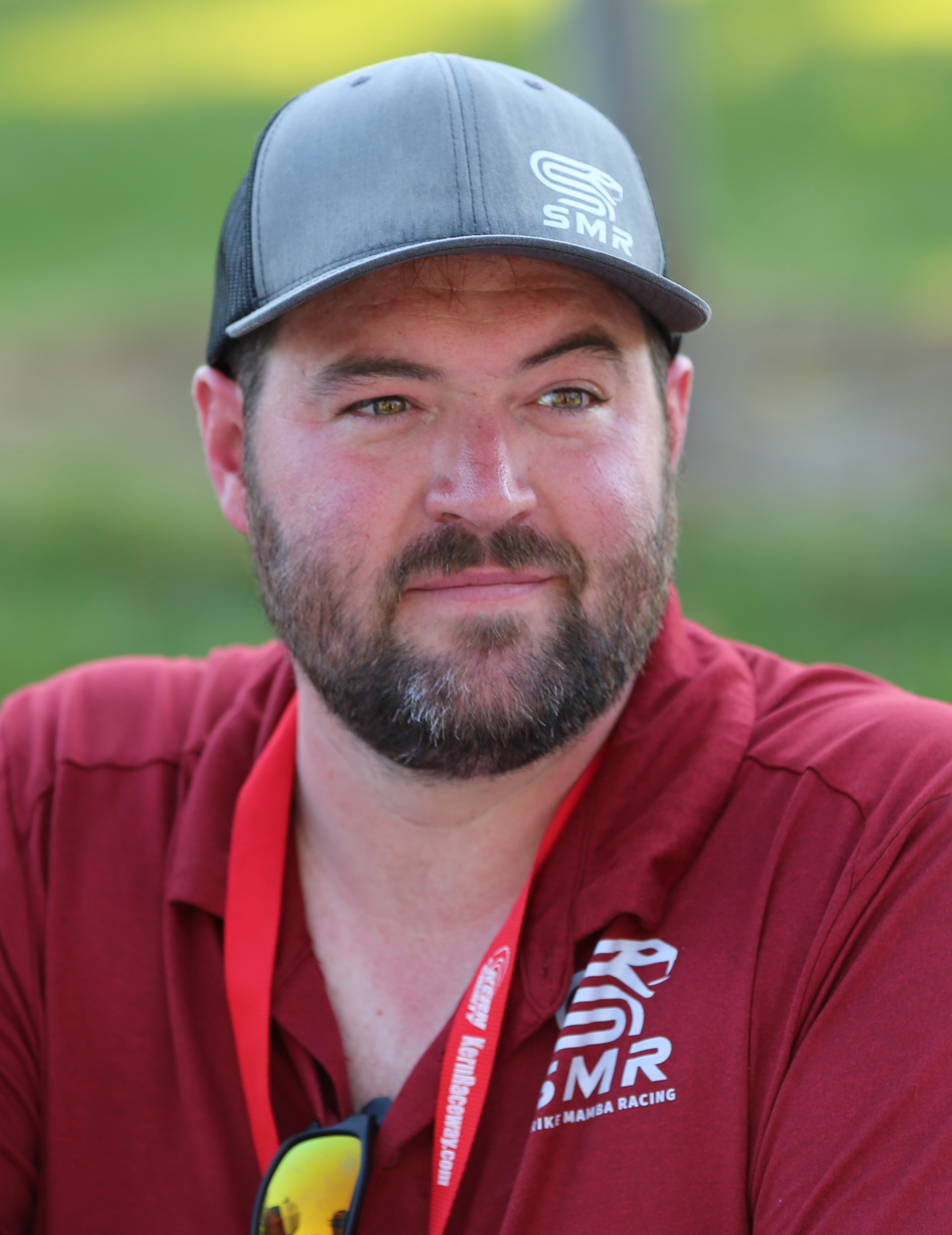
- Reaume at All American Speedway in 2025
- Born: January 21, 1989 (age 37); Highlands, British Columbia, Canada

ARCA Menards Series career
- 1 race run over 1 year
- Best finish: 132nd (2025)
- First race: 2025 General Tire 150 (Phoenix)
Wins	Top tens	Poles
0	0	0

ARCA Menards Series West career
- 5 races run over 1 year
- Best finish: 14th (2025)
- First race: 2025 General Tire 150 (Phoenix)
- Last race: 2025 NAPA Auto Parts 150 (Roseville)
Wins	Top tens	Poles
0	1	0
- Statistics up to date as of November 2, 2025.

Jonathan Reaume (born January 21, 1989) is a Canadian professional stock car racing driver and team owner who last competed part-time in the ARCA Menards Series West, driving the No. 72 Chevrolet for his own team, Strike Mamba Racing. He is the older brother of fellow racing driver and team owner Josh Reaume.

== Racing career ==
Reaume grew up in Nigeria and began kart racing at eight years old alongside his brother, Josh. In 2006, Reaume contested the Rotax Max Challenge Grand Finals in Viana do Castelo, Portugal, finishing 56th out of 69 competitors in the Senior Max category. The same year, Reaume moved back to Canada.

Reaume has previously competed in events such as the Canada 200 and the Bridge City 200.

In 2024, Reaume was originally scheduled to make his debut in the ARCA Menards Series West at Phoenix Raceway, driving the No. 72 Chevrolet for Reaume Brothers Racing, although he withdrew from the event a couple days after the entry list was revealed.

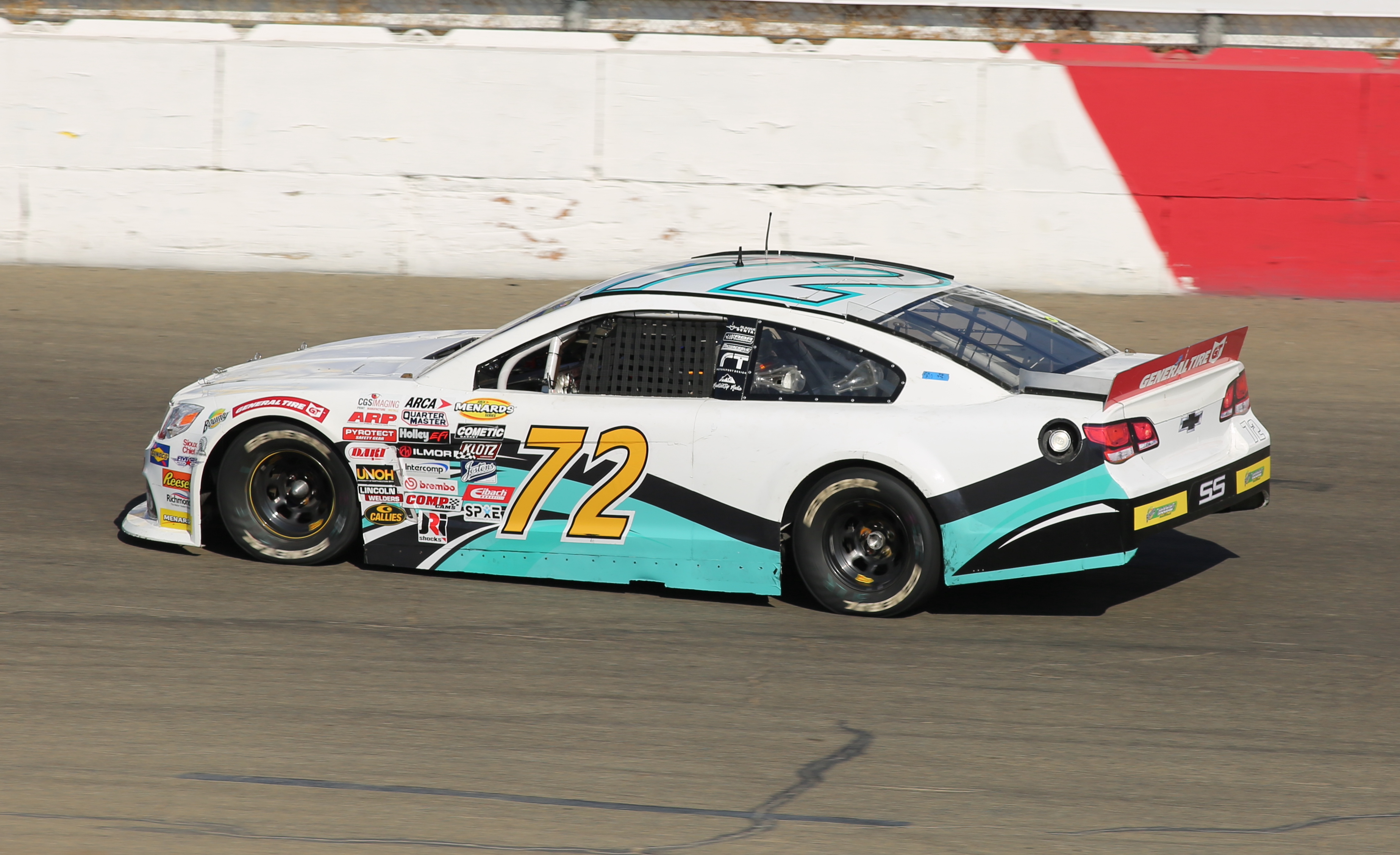
Reaume's No. 72 car at All American Speedway in 2025

In 2025, Reaume went on to form his own team, Strike Mamba Racing, and signed Blake Lothian to drive the No. 51 Chevrolet full-time in the West Series, and Cody Dennison to run the No. 72 at the season opening race at Kevin Harvick's Kern Raceway. For Reaume, it was revealed in March of that year that he would attempt to make his debut in the series at Phoenix again, this time driving the No. 72 for SMR.

== Motorsports results ==
=== Stock car career summary ===
Season	Series	Team	Races	Wins	Top 5	Top 10	Points	Position
2024	ARCA Menards Series West	Reaume Brothers Racing	0	0	0	0	0	N/A
2025	ARCA Menards Series West	Strike Mamba Racing	5	0	0	1	145	14th
2025	ARCA Menards Series	Strike Mamba Racing	1	0	0	0	19	132nd

=== ARCA Menards Series ===
(key) (Bold – Pole position awarded by qualifying time. Italics – Pole position earned by points standings or practice time. * – Most laps led.)

ARCA Menards Series results
Year	Team	No.	Make	1	2	3	4	5	6	7	8	9	10	11	12	13	14	15	16	17	18	19	20	AMSC	Pts	Ref
2025	Strike Mamba Racing	72	Chevy	DAY	PHO; 25	TAL	KAN	CLT	MCH	BLN	ELK	LRP	DOV	IRP	IOW	GLN	ISF	MAD	DSF	BRI	SLM	KAN	TOL	132nd	19	

==== ARCA Menards Series West ====
ARCA Menards Series West results
Year	Team	No.	Make	1	2	3	4	5	6	7	8	9	10	11	12	AMSWC	Pts	Ref
2024	Reaume Brothers Racing	72	Chevy	PHO	KER	PIR	SON	IRW	IRW	SHA	TRI	MAD	AAS	KER	PHO; Wth	N/A	0	
2025	Strike Mamba Racing	72	Chevy	KER	PHO; 25	TUC	CNS	KER; 8	SON; 16	TRI; 12	PIR	AAS; 14	MAD	LVS	PHO	14th	145	
