= 2026 Portland 112 =

ARCA Menards Series West race at Portland International Raceway

Race details
- Race 8 of 13 in the 2026 ARCA Menards Series West
- Date: August 8, 2026
- Location: Portland International Raceway in Portland, Oregon
- Course: Permanent racing facility
- Course length: 1.967 miles (3.166 km)
- Distance: 57 laps, 112.86 mi (181.631 km)
- Average speed: 67.037 miles per hour (107.886 km/h)

Pole position
Driver	Ethan Tovo	Nitro Motorsports
- Time: 1:15.974

Most laps led
Driver	Sam Corry	Nitro Motorsports
- Laps: 49

Fastest lap
Driver	Sam Corry	Nitro Motorsports
- Time: 1:17.367

Winner
No. 19	Mason Massey	Bill McAnally Racing

Television in the United States
- Network: FloRacing
- Announcers: Charles Krall

Radio in the United States
- Radio: ARN

The 2026 Portland 112 was an ARCA Menards Series West race held on Saturday, August 8, 2026, at Portland International Raceway in Portland, Oregon. Contested over 57 laps on the 1.967-mile (3.166 km) road course, it was the 8th race of the 2026 ARCA Menards Series West season, and the 6th running of the event.

In a wild finish, Mason Massey, driving for Bill McAnally Racing, took advantage of the leaders in a last-lap thriller, coming from fourth to leading in the final corner to score his second career ARCA Menards Series West win. Kyle Steckly took over the lead after Nitro Motorsports teammates Ethan Tovo and Sam Corry made contact, sending them off-track into the grass. Steckly overshot the final corner, giving Massey the lead and the victory. Hailie Deegan snuck through to finish third, with Tovo and Eric Johnson Jr. rounding out the top five. Jeff Anton, Robbie Kennealy, Alex Quarterley, Andrew Chapman, and Gavin Ray rounded out the top ten.

== Report ==
=== Background ===
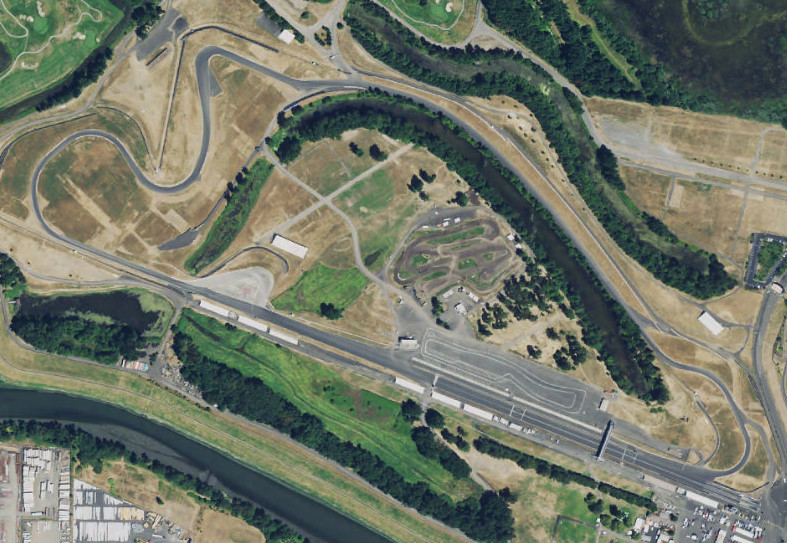
Portland International Raceway, the track where the race was held.

Portland International Raceway (PIR) is a motorsport facility in Portland in the U.S. state of Oregon. It is part of the Delta Park complex on the former site of Vanport, just south of the Columbia River. It lies west of the Delta Park/Vanport light rail station and less than a mile west of Interstate 5.

The track has hosted the IndyCar Series, Formula E, ICSCC and SCCA and OMRRA road racing, the ARCA Menards Series West, the NASCAR O'Reilly Auto Parts Series, the NASCAR Craftsman Truck Series in the past, and SCCA autocross events. Additionally, the PIR grounds are host to OBRA (Oregon Bicycle Racing Association) bicycling races on the track and the surrounding grounds. The facility includes a dragstrip and a motocross track.

==== Entry list ====
- (R) denotes rookie driver.

#	Driver	Team	Make
1	Robbie Kennealy	Jan's Towing Racing	Ford
04	Ian Wood	Kart Idaho Racing	Ford
4	Kyle Keller	Nascimento Motorsports	Toyota
05	David Smith	Shockwave Motorsports	Toyota
5	Eric Johnson Jr.	Jerry Pitts Racing	Toyota
6	Caleb Shrader	Jerry Pitts Racing	Toyota
7	Gavin Ray (R)	Jerry Pitts Racing	Ford
13	Todd Souza	Central Coast Racing	Ford
15	Mia Lovell (R)	Nitro Motorsports	Toyota
16	Hailie Deegan	Bill McAnally Racing	Chevrolet
19	Mason Massey	Bill McAnally Racing	Chevrolet
20	Brad McAllister	Nitro Motorsports	Toyota
25	Sam Corry	Nitro Motorsports	Toyota
27	Bobby Hillis Jr.	Fierce Creature Racing	Chevrolet
32	Alex Quarterley	1/4 Ley Racing	Chevrolet
38	Ray Bolinger	Kart Idaho Racing	Toyota
44	Jeff Anton	Anton Racing	Chevrolet
50	Trevor Huddleston	High Point Racing	Ford
51	Austin Varco	Strike Mamba Racing	Chevrolet
53	Kyle Steckly	NDS Motorsports	Chevrolet
55	Andrew Chapman (R)	High Point Racing	Ford
70	Ethan Tovo	Nitro Motorsports	Toyota
71	Cole Denton (R)	Jan's Towing Racing	Ford
72	Josiah Reaume	Strike Mamba Racing	Chevrolet
77	Ryan Vargas	Performance P-1 Motorsports	Toyota
90	Graham Jacobson	Nitro Motorsports	Toyota
Official entry list

== Practice ==
The first and only practice session was held on Saturday, August 8, at 1:40 PM PST, and lasted for 40 minutes.

Sam Corry, driving for Nitro Motorsports, set the fastest time in the session, with a lap of 1:16.997 seconds, and a speed of 91.967 miles per hour (148.007 km/h).

=== Practice results ===
Pos.	#	Driver	Team	Make	Time	Speed
1	25	Sam Corry	Nitro Motorsports	Toyota	1:16.997	91.967
2	70	Ethan Tovo	Nitro Motorsports	Toyota	1:17.167	91.765
3	15	Mia Lovell (R)	Nitro Motorsports	Toyota	1:17.572	91.286
Full practice results

== Qualifying ==
Qualifying was held on Saturday, August 8, at 3:25 PM PST. The qualifying procedure used was a multi-car, multi-lap based system. All drivers were on track for a 20-minute timed session, and whoever set the fastest time in the session won the pole.

Ethan Tovo, driving for Nitro Motorsports, qualified on pole position with a lap of 1:15.974 seconds, and a speed of 93.206 miles per hour (150.001 km/h). However, Tovo started at the rear of the field due to unapproved adjustments.

=== Qualifying results ===
Pos.	#	Driver	Team	Make	Time	Speed
1	70	Ethan Tovo	Nitro Motorsports	Toyota	1:15.974	93.206
2	25	Sam Corry	Nitro Motorsports	Toyota	1:16.176	92.958
3	15	Mia Lovell (R)	Nitro Motorsports	Toyota	1:16.900	92.083
4	13	Todd Souza	Central Coast Racing	Ford	1:17.212	91.711
5	90	Graham Jacobson	Nitro Motorsports	Toyota	1:17.327	91.575
6	16	Hailie Deegan	Bill McAnally Racing	Chevrolet	1:17.419	91.466
7	19	Mason Massey	Bill McAnally Racing	Chevrolet	1:17.588	91.267
8	71	Cole Denton (R)	Jan's Towing Racing	Ford	1:17.800	91.018
9	6	Caleb Shrader	Jerry Pitts Racing	Toyota	1:17.874	90.932
10	5	Eric Johnson Jr.	Jerry Pitts Racing	Toyota	1:17.896	90.906
11	1	Robbie Kennealy	Jan's Towing Racing	Ford	1:18.038	90.740
12	4	Kyle Keller	Nascimento Motorsports	Toyota	1:18.164	90.594
13	44	Jeff Anton	Anton Racing	Chevrolet	1:18.190	90.564
14	50	Trevor Huddleston	High Point Racing	Ford	1:18.225	90.523
15	20	Brad McAllister	Nitro Motorsports	Toyota	1:18.291	90.447
16	55	Andrew Chapman (R)	High Point Racing	Ford	1:18.457	90.256
17	53	Kyle Steckly	NDS Motorsports	Chevrolet	1:18.661	90.022
18	32	Alex Quarterley	1/4 Ley Racing	Chevrolet	1:19.220	89.387
19	51	Austin Varco	Strike Mamba Racing	Chevrolet	1:19.819	88.716
20	7	Gavin Ray (R)	Jerry Pitts Racing	Ford	1:20.486	87.981
21	77	Ryan Vargas	Performance P-1 Motorsports	Toyota	1:22.682	85.644
22	27	Bobby Hillis Jr.	Fierce Creature Racing	Chevrolet	1:23.280	85.029
23	04	Ian Wood	Kart Idaho Racing	Ford	1:24.516	83.785
24	72	Josiah Reaume	Strike Mamba Racing	Chevrolet	1:29.225	79.363
25	38	Ray Bolinger	Kart Idaho Racing	Toyota	1:43.091	68.689
26	05	David Smith	Shockwave Motorsports	Toyota	—	—
Official qualifying results

== Race ==
=== Race results ===
Laps: 57

Fin	St	#	Driver	Team	Make	Laps	Led	Status	Pts
1	7	19	Mason Massey	Bill McAnally Racing	Chevrolet	57	1	Running	47
2	17	53	Kyle Steckly	NDS Motorsports	Chevrolet	57	0	Running	42
3	6	16	Hailie Deegan	Bill McAnally Racing	Chevrolet	57	0	Running	41
4	1	70	Ethan Tovo	Nitro Motorsports	Toyota	57	1	Running	42
5	10	5	Eric Johnson Jr.	Jerry Pitts Racing	Toyota	57	0	Running	39
6	13	44	Jeff Anton	Anton Racing	Chevrolet	57	0	Running	38
7	11	1	Robbie Kennealy	Jan's Towing Racing	Ford	57	0	Running	37
8	18	32	Alex Quarterley	1/4 Ley Racing	Chevrolet	57	0	Running	36
9	16	55	Andrew Chapman (R)	High Point Racing	Ford	57	0	Running	35
10	20	7	Gavin Ray (R)	Jerry Pitts Racing	Ford	57	0	Running	34
11	3	15	Mia Lovell (R)	Nitro Motorsports	Toyota	57	0	Running	33
12	5	90	Graham Jacobson	Nitro Motorsports	Toyota	57	6	Running	33
13	14	50	Trevor Huddleston	High Point Racing	Ford	57	0	Running	31
14	22	27	Bobby Hillis Jr.	Fierce Creature Racing	Chevrolet	57	0	Running	30
15	2	25	Sam Corry	Nitro Motorsports	Toyota	57	49	Running	31
16	8	71	Cole Denton (R)	Jan's Towing Racing	Ford	57	0	Running	28
17	19	51	Austin Varco	Strike Mamba Racing	Chevrolet	56	0	Running	27
18	15	20	Brad McAllister	Nitro Motorsports	Toyota	54	0	Mechanical	26
19	23	04	Ian Wood	Kart Idaho Racing	Ford	53	0	Running	25
20	26	05	David Smith	Shockwave Motorsports	Toyota	50	0	Running	24
21	12	4	Kyle Keller	Nascimento Motorsports	Toyota	38	0	Mechanical	23
22	21	77	Ryan Vargas	Performance P-1 Motorsports	Toyota	31	0	Mechanical	22
23	9	6	Caleb Shrader	Jerry Pitts Racing	Toyota	21	0	Mechanical	21
24	4	13	Todd Souza	Central Coast Racing	Ford	21	0	Brakes	20
25	25	38	Ray Bolinger	Kart Idaho Racing	Toyota	6	0	Mechanical	19
26	24	72	Josiah Reaume	Strike Mamba Racing	Chevrolet	3	0	Mechanical	18
Official race results

=== Race statistics ===
- Lead changes: 4 among 4 different drivers
- Cautions/Laps: 6 for 16 laps
- Red flags: 1
- Time of race: 1 hour, 40 minutes and 21 seconds
- Average speed: 67.037 miles per hour (107.886 km/h)

== Standings after the race ==
Drivers' Championship standings

	Pos	Driver	Points
	1	Trevor Huddleston	379
1	2	Mason Massey	361 (–18)
1	3	Robbie Kennealy	346 (–33)
2	4	Cole Denton	342 (–37)
	5	Eric Johnson Jr.	337 (–42)
1	6	Hailie Deegan	327 (–52)
1	7	Mia Lovell	321 (–58)
	8	Andrew Chapman	315 (–64)
	9	Gavin Ray	310 (–69)
	10	David Smith	267 (–112)

- Note: Only the first 10 positions are included for the driver standings.

Previous race: 2026 General Tire 150 (Sonoma)	ARCA Menards Series West; 2026 season	Next race: 2026 NAPA Auto Parts 150 (Roseville)
