= 2025 NAPA Auto Parts 150 (Roseville) =

9th race of the 2025 ARCA Menards Series West

2025 NAPA Auto Parts 150 presented by the West Coast Stock Car Motorsports Hall of Fame
Race details
- Race 9 of 12 in the 2025 ARCA Menards Series West season
- Date: September 13, 2025
- Location: All American Speedway in Roseville, California
- Course: Permanent racing facility
- Course length: 0.333 miles (0.536 km)
- Distance: 150 laps, 50 mi (80 km)
- Scheduled distance: 150 laps, 50 mi (80 km)
- Average speed: 69.455 mph (111.777 km/h)

Pole position
Driver	Robbie Kennealy	Jan's Towing Racing
- Time: 13.841

Most laps led
Driver	Robbie Kennealy	Jan's Towing Racing
- Laps: 144

Winner
No. 1	Robbie Kennealy	Jan's Towing Racing

Television in the United States
- Network: FloRacing
- Announcers: Charles Krall

Radio in the United States
- Radio: ARCA Racing Network

The 2025 NAPA Auto Parts 150 presented by the West Coast Stock Car Motorsports Hall of Fame was the 9th stock car race of the 2024 ARCA Menards Series West season, and the 18th iteration of the event. The race was held on Saturday, September 13, 2025, at the All American Speedway in Roseville, California, a 0.333 mile (0.536 km) permanent oval shaped racetrack. The race took the scheduled 150 laps to complete. Robbie Kennealy, driving for Jan's Towing Racing, would put on a blistering performance, leading all but six laps from the pole position to earn his first career ARCA Menards Series West win. To fill out the podium, Trevor Huddleston and Andrew Chapman, both driving for High Point Racing, would finish 2nd and 3rd, respectively.

== Report ==
=== Background ===
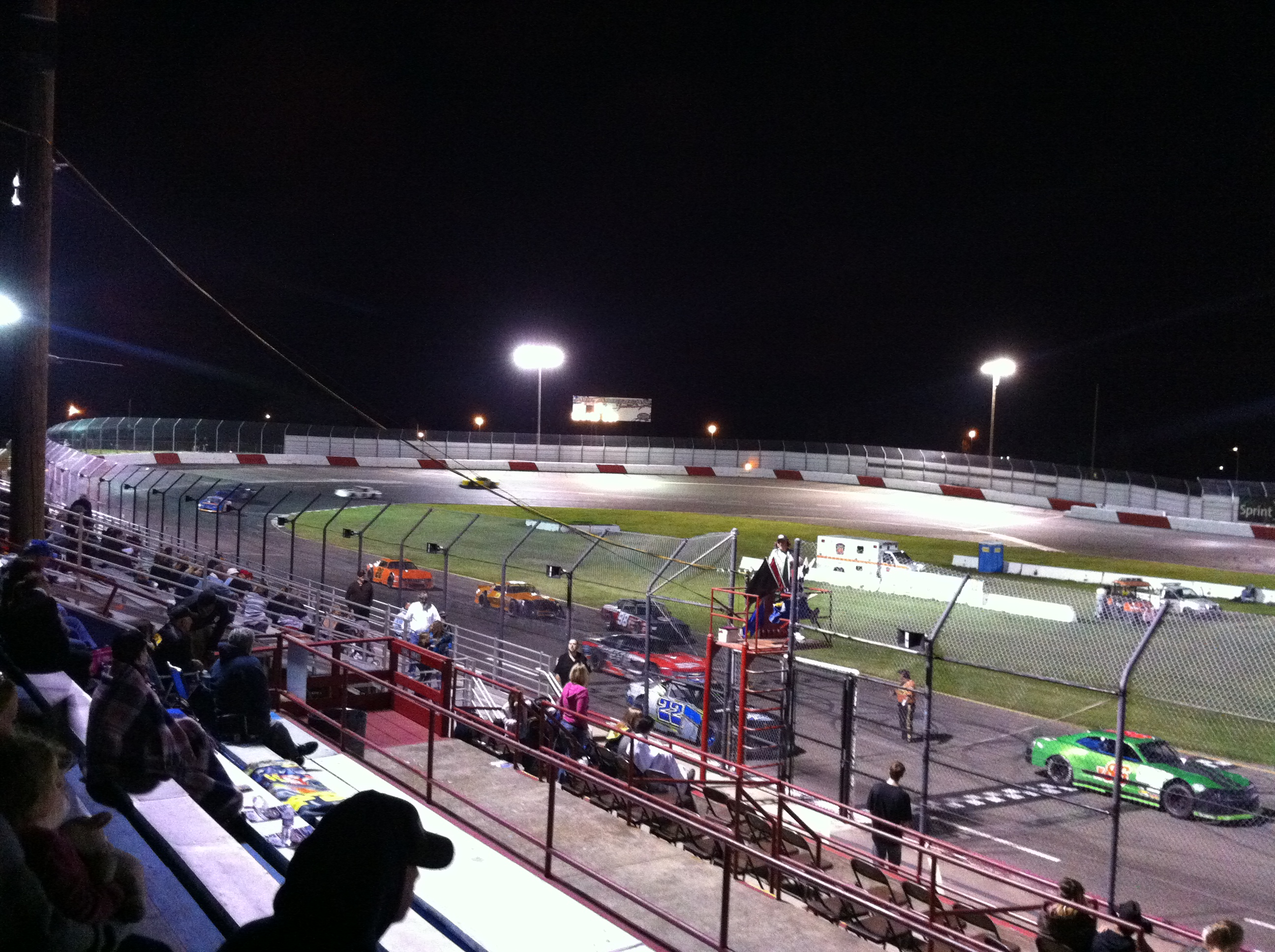
All American Speedway, the track where the race was held.

All American Speedway is a 1/3-mile NASCAR-sanctioned paved oval racetrack located in Roseville, California.

The track first began operations in 1954. The track was originally a quarter mile long, but was renovated before the 2008 racing season to its current length of one third of a mile.

Between the years 1977 and 1982, five NASCAR Winston Grand National West Series events were held at the track. Since the renovation prior to the 2008 season, sixteen more ARCA Menards Series West races have been held at the track. The venue also hosts an annual round of the SRL Southwest Tour.

=== Entry list ===
- (R) denotes rookie driver.

#	Driver	Team	Make
1	Robbie Kennealy (R)	Jan's Towing Racing	Ford
3	Todd Souza	Central Coast Racing	Toyota
4	Eric Nascimento	Nascimento Motorsports	Chevrolet
05	David Smith	Shockwave Motorsports	Toyota
5	Eric Johnson Jr.	Jerry Pitts Racing	Toyota
9	R. J. Smotherman	Jan's Towing Racing	Ford
13	Tanner Reif	Central Coast Racing	Toyota
19	Jake Bollman (R)	Bill McAnally Racing	Chevrolet
50	Trevor Huddleston	High Point Racing	Ford
51	Blake Lothian (R)	Strike Mamba Racing	Chevrolet
55	Andrew Chapman	High Point Racing	Ford
71	Kyle Keller	Jan's Towing Racing	Ford
72	Jonathan Reaume	Strike Mamba Racing	Chevrolet
88	Joey Iest	Naake-Klauer Motorsports	Ford
Official entry list

== Practice ==
The first and only practice session was held on Saturday, September 13, at 3:00 PM PST, and would last for 60 minutes. Jake Bollman, driving for Bill McAnally Racing, would set the fastest time in the session, with a lap of 13.833, and a speed of 86.662 mph (139.469 km/h).

Pos.	#	Driver	Team	Make	Time	Speed
1	19	Jake Bollman (R)	Bill McAnally Racing	Chevrolet	13.833	86.662
2	1	Robbie Kennealy (R)	Jan's Towing Racing	Ford	13.918	86.133
3	4	Eric Nascimento	Nascimento Motorsports	Chevrolet	13.945	85.966
Full practice results

== Qualifying ==
Qualifying was held on Saturday, September 13, at 4:20 PM PST. The qualifying procedure used is a single-car, two-lap based system. Drivers will be on track by themselves and will have two laps to post a qualifying time, and whoever sets the fastest time will win the pole.

Robbie Kennealy, driving for Jan's Towing Racing, would score the pole for the race, with a lap of 13.841, and a speed of 86.612 mph (139.389 km/h).

=== Qualifying results ===
Pos.	#	Driver	Team	Make	Time	Speed
1	1	Robbie Kennealy (R)	Jan's Towing Racing	Ford	13.841	86.612
2	13	Tanner Reif	Central Coast Racing	Toyota	13.908	86.195
3	4	Eric Nascimento	Nascimento Motorsports	Chevrolet	13.918	86.133
4	50	Trevor Huddleston	High Point Racing	Ford	13.938	86.009
5	71	Kyle Keller	Jan's Towing Racing	Ford	13.940	85.997
6	9	R. J. Smotherman	Jan's Towing Racing	Ford	13.965	85.843
7	3	Todd Souza	Central Coast Racing	Toyota	13.969	85.819
8	19	Jake Bollman (R)	Bill McAnally Racing	Chevrolet	13.994	85.665
9	5	Eric Johnson Jr.	Jerry Pitts Racing	Toyota	14.049	85.330
10	55	Andrew Chapman	High Point Racing	Ford	14.058	85.275
11	88	Joey Iest	Naake-Klauer Motorsports	Ford	14.124	84.877
12	51	Blake Lothian (R)	Strike Mamba Racing	Chevrolet	14.234	84.221
13	05	David Smith	Shockwave Motorsports	Toyota	14.874	80.597
14	72	Jonathan Reaume	Strike Mamba Racing	Chevrolet	15.013	79.851
Official qualifying results

== Race results ==
Fin	St	#	Driver	Team	Make	Laps	Led	Status	Pts
1	1	1	Robbie Kennealy (R)	Jan's Towing Racing	Ford	150	144	Running	49
2	4	50	Trevor Huddleston	High Point Racing	Ford	150	0	Running	42
3	10	55	Andrew Chapman	High Point Racing	Ford	150	0	Running	41
4	11	88	Joey Iest	Naake-Klauer Motorsports	Ford	150	0	Running	40
5	9	5	Eric Johnson Jr.	Jerry Pitts Racing	Toyota	150	0	Running	39
6	5	71	Kyle Keller	Jan's Towing Racing	Ford	150	0	Running	38
7	8	19	Jake Bollman (R)	Bill McAnally Racing	Chevrolet	150	0	Running	37
8	2	13	Tanner Reif	Central Coast Racing	Toyota	150	6	Running	37
9	3	4	Eric Nascimento	Nascimento Motorsports	Chevrolet	149	0	Running	35
10	12	51	Blake Lothian (R)	Strike Mamba Racing	Chevrolet	149	0	Running	34
11	7	3	Todd Souza	Central Coast Racing	Toyota	146	0	Running	33
12	13	05	David Smith	Shockwave Motorsports	Toyota	141	0	Running	32
13	6	9	R. J. Smotherman	Jan's Towing Racing	Ford	94	0	Brakes	31
14	14	72	Jonathan Reaume	Strike Mamba Racing	Chevrolet	9	0	Suspension	30
Official race results

== Standings after the race ==
Drivers' Championship standings

	Pos	Driver	Points
	1	Trevor Huddleston	419
	2	Kyle Keller	407 (–12)
	3	Tanner Reif	393 (–26)
1	4	Robbie Kennealy	385 (–34)
1	5	Eric Johnson Jr.	382 (–37)
	6	Blake Lothian	336 (–83)
	7	David Smith	315 (–104)
	8	Jake Bollman	227 (–192)
	9	Todd Souza	196 (–223)
	10	Jonathan Reaume	145 (–274)

- Note: Only the first 10 positions are included for the driver standings.

Previous race: 2025 Portland 112	ARCA Menards Series West; 2025 season	Next race: 2025 Madera 150
