= Treyten Lapcevich =

Canadian racing driver (born 2004)

- Born: April 6, 2004 (age 22); Grimsby, Ontario, Canada
- Achievements: 2023 NASCAR Pinty's Series champion

NASCAR FedEx Freight Truck Series career
- 1 race run over 1 year
- 2025 position: 71st
- Best finish: 71st (2025)
- First race: 2025 UNOH 250 (Bristol)
Wins	Top tens	Poles
0	0	0

NASCAR Canada Series career
- 39 races run over 4 years
- 2023 position: 1st
- Best finish: 1st (2023)
- First race: 2020 QwickWick 125 (Sunset)
- Last race: 2023 Pintys Fall Brawl (Delaware)
- First win: 2022 NTN Ultimate Bearing Experience 250 (Sunset)
- Last win: 2023 Pintys Fall Brawl (Delaware)
Wins	Top tens	Poles
9	33	9

ARCA Menards Series career
- 2 races run over 2 years
- Best finish: 54th (2025)
- First race: 2025 General Tire 150 (Phoenix)
- Last race: 2025 Berlin ARCA 200 (Berlin)
- First win: 2025 Berlin ARCA 200 (Berlin)
Wins	Top tens	Poles
1	2	1

ARCA Menards Series West career
- 1 race run over 1 year
- Best finish: 50th (2025)
- First race: 2025 General Tire 150 (Phoenix)
Wins	Top tens	Poles
0	1	0
- Statistics up to date as of September 3, 2026.

Treyten Lapcevich (born April 6, 2004) is a Canadian professional stock car racing driver who currently competes in the zMAX CARS Tour, driving the No. 77 Chevrolet for Chad Bryant Racing in the Late Model Stock Tour, and the No. 30 Toyota for Rette Jones Racing in the Pro Late Model Tour. He previously competed in the ARCA Menards Series and NASCAR Craftsman Truck Series. He is the 2023 NASCAR Pinty's Series champion.

== Racing career ==
Lapcevich made his Pinty’s Series debut at Sunset Speedway in 2020 as a substitute for Alex Tagliani in the No. 18 car. He would finish second in his debut. He would also run the second race at Sunset that season.

Lapcevich would move to the No. 20 full-time in 2021. He would score seven top-tens along with five top-fives. His best finish of the season would come at the first race of three at Delaware Speedway with a second-place finish. He would earn his first career win in 2022 at Sunset Speedway in the NTN Ultimate Bearings 250. He would start second and lead two laps. He would win again at Ohsweken Speedway after passing his teammate Stewart Friesen in Turn 3 on the final lap. Lapevich took the lead on lap 49 and would lead for the rest of the race. Lapevich would score a career high with ten top-tens and seven top-fives in 2022.

In 2023, Lapcevich won the season opener for the second year in a row at Sunset Speedway. He would win again for the second race in a row, this time at Canadian Tire Motorsport Park. He was running second on the final lap before making contact with Marc-Antoine Camirand.

On March 3, 2025, it was announced that Lapcevich would make his ARCA Menards Series debut at Phoenix Raceway, driving the No. 15 Toyota for Venturini Motorsports. A few months later, it was announced that Lapcevich would drive for Nitro Motorsports at Berlin Raceway. He would earn his and the team's first ARCA win after starting from the pole. Several months later, he made his debut in the NASCAR Craftsman Truck Series, driving the No. 02 Chevrolet for Young's Motorsports.

== Personal life ==
Lapcevich’s older brother, Cayden was the 2016 NASCAR Pinty's Series champion and current crew chief in the ARCA Menards Series West for Bill McAnally Racing. Treyten’s father, Jeff was also a driver in both the CASCAR Super Series, CASCAR East, CASCAR West and NASCAR Pinty's Series. Jeff also raced in the Grand-Am Road Racing Series.

== Motorsports career results ==
=== Stock car career summary ===
Season	Series	Team	Races	Wins	Top 5	Top 10	Points	Position
2020	NASCAR Pinty's Series	22 Racing	2	0	2	2	83	15th
2021	NASCAR Pinty's Series	22 Racing	10	0	5	7	361	5th
2022	NASCAR Pinty's Series	22 Racing	13	2	7	10	480	4th
2023	NASCAR Pinty's Series	22 Racing	14	7	11	14	612	**1st**
2024	ASA STARS National Tour	Jeff Lapcevich	1	0	0	0	32	82nd
2024	CARS Late Model Stock Car Tour	Chad Bryant Racing	17	1	6	12	388	6th
2025	CARS Pro Late Model Tour	LowCountry Motorsports	1	0	0	1	32	56th
2025	CARS Late Model Stock Car Tour	AK Performance	1	0	0	0	16	91st
2025	ARCA Menards Series West	Venturini Motorsports	1	0	1	1	35	50th
2025	ARCA Menards Series	Venturini Motorsports	1	0	1	1	84	54th
2025	ARCA Menards Series	Nitro Motorsports	1	1	1	1	84	54th
2025	NASCAR Craftsman Truck Series	Young's Motorsports	1	0	0	0	5	71st
2026	ASA STARS National Tour	Rette Jones Racing	1	0	1	1		
2026	CARS Pro Late Model Tour	LowCountry Motorsports	1	0	1	1	380	4th
2026	CARS Pro Late Model Tour	Rette Jones Racing	10	0	5	6	380	4th
2026	CARS Late Model Stock Car Tour	Chad Bryant Racing	13	0	4	10	490	**2nd**
2026	CARS Late Model Stock Car Tour	JR Motorsports	1	1	1	1	490	**2nd**

=== NASCAR ===
(key) (Bold – Pole position awarded by qualifying time. Italics – Pole position earned by points standings or practice time. * – Most laps led.)

==== Craftsman Truck Series ====
NASCAR Craftsman Truck Series results
Year	Team	No.	Make	1	2	3	4	5	6	7	8	9	10	11	12	13	14	15	16	17	18	19	20	21	22	23	24	25	NCTC	Pts	Ref
2025	Young's Motorsports	02	Chevy	DAY	ATL	LVS	HOM	MAR	BRI	CAR	TEX	KAN	NWS	CLT	NSH	MCH	POC	LRP	IRP	GLN	RCH	DAR	BRI; 32	NHA	ROV	TAL	MAR	PHO	71st	5	

^{*} Season still in progress
^{1} Ineligible for series points

=== ARCA Menards Series ===
(key) (Bold – Pole position awarded by qualifying time. Italics – Pole position earned by points standings or practice time. * – Most laps led. ** – All laps led.)

ARCA Menards Series results
Year	Team	No.	Make	1	2	3	4	5	6	7	8	9	10	11	12	13	14	15	16	17	18	19	20	AMSC	Pts	Ref
2025	Venturini Motorsports	15	Toyota	DAY	PHO; 3	TAL	KAN	CLT	MCH															54th	84	
2025	Nitro Motorsports	70	Toyota							**BLN**; 1**	ELK	LRP	DOV	IRP	IOW	GLN	ISF	MAD	DSF	BRI	SLM	KAN	TOL	54th	84	

==== ARCA Menards Series West ====
ARCA Menards Series West results
Year	Team	No.	Make	1	2	3	4	5	6	7	8	9	10	11	12	AMSWC	Pts	Ref
2025	Venturini Motorsports	15	Toyota	KER	PHO; 3	TUC	CNS	KER	SON	TRI	PIR	AAS	MAD	LVS	PHO	50th	35	

=== CARS Late Model Stock Car Tour ===
(key) (Bold – Pole position awarded by qualifying time. Italics – Pole position earned by points standings or practice time. * – Most laps led. ** – All laps led.)

CARS Late Model Stock Car Tour results
Year	Team	No.	Make	1	2	3	4	5	6	7	8	9	10	11	12	13	14	15	16	17	CLMSCTC	Pts	Ref
2024	Chad Bryant Racing	77	Chevy	SNM; 9	HCY; 10	AAS; 4	OCS; 10	ACE; 7	TCM; 18	LGY; 5	DOM; 3	CRW; 11		NWS; 1	ACE; 9	WCS; 2	FLC; 11	SBO; 2	TCM; 12	NWS; 21	6th	388	
2024	Chad Bryant Racing	72	Chevy										HCY; 6								6th	388	
2025	AK Performance	98	N/A	AAS	WCS	CDL	OCS	ACE	NWS	LGY	DOM	CRW	HCY; 26	AND	FLC	SBO	TCM	NWS			91st	16	
2026	Chad Bryant Racing	77L	Chevy	SNM; 9	WCS; 6	NSV; 6	CRW; 7	ACE; 2	LGY; 5	DOM; 7	NWS; 17	HCY; 2	AND; 4	FLC; 15	TCM; 17	NPS; 8					2nd	490	
2026	JR Motorsports	8	Chevy														SBO; 1				2nd	490	

=== CARS Pro Late Model Tour ===
(key)

CARS Pro Late Model Tour results
Year	Team	No.	Make	1	2	3	4	5	6	7	8	9	10	11	12	13	CPLMTC	Pts	Ref
2025	LowCountry Motorsports	7	Chevy	AAS	CDL	OCS	ACE	NWS	CRW	HCY	HCY	AND	FLC	SBO	TCM	NWS; 10	56th	32	
2026	LowCountry Motorsports	67	Chevy	SNM; 5													4th	380	
2026	Rette Jones Racing	30	Toyota		NSV; 12	**CRW**; 20	ACE; 3	NWS; 18	HCY; 3	AND; 12	**FLC**; 3*	TCM; 6	NPS; 4	SBO; 4			4th	380	

=== ASA STARS National Tour ===
(key) (Bold – Pole position awarded by qualifying time. Italics – Pole position earned by points standings or practice time. * – Most laps led. ** – All laps led.)

ASA STARS National Tour results
Year	Team	No.	Make	1	2	3	4	5	6	7	8	9	10	11	ASNTC	Pts	Ref
2024	Jeff Lapcevich	32L	N/A	NSM; 20	FIF	HCY	MAD	MLW	AND	OWO	TOL	WIN	NSV		82nd	32	
2026	Rette Jones Racing	30	Toyota	NSM	FIF	HCY	SLG	MAD	NPS	OWO	TRI	WIN	NSV; 4	NSM	-*	-*	
