= Robbie Kennealy =

American racing driver (born 2006)

- Kennealy at Madera Speedway in 2026
- Born: March 3, 2006 (age 20); Madera Acres, California, U.S.
- Awards: 2025 ARCA Menards Series West Rookie of the Year

ARCA Menards Series career
- 6 races run over 3 years
- Best finish: 42nd (2026)
- First race: 2024 General Tire 150 (Phoenix)
- Last race: 2026 Alabama Manufactured Housing 200 (Talladega)
Wins	Top tens	Poles
0	2	0

ARCA Menards Series West career
- 37 races run over 4 years
- Best finish: 3rd (2025, 2026)
- First race: 2023 NAPA Auto Parts Blue DEF 150 (Irwindale)
- Last race: 2026 NAPA Auto Parts 150 (Bakersfield)
- First win: 2025 NAPA Auto Parts 150 (Roseville)
Wins	Top tens	Poles
1	24	2
- Statistics up to date as of November 2, 2026.

Robbie Kennealy (born March 3, 2006) is an American professional stock car racing driver. He last competed full-time in the ARCA Menards Series West, driving the No. 1 Ford for Jan's Towing Racing, and part-time in the ARCA Menards Series, driving in a partnership entry between Jan's Towing Racing and Fast Track Racing.

Born and raised in Madera, California, Kennealy began racing at the age of four. While racing late models, in 2021, he joined a development team owned by racing driver Kyle Keller. Kennealy made his debut attempts in the ARCA Menards West Series in 2023 for his family team, obtaining some early success. Partnering with Keller to form Kennealy Keller Motorsports the following year, Kennealy was originally scheduled to run the full West Series season. However, two engine failures and his father's passing led to the team's early folding. In 2025, he joined Jan's Towing Racing, having a breakout season that included his first West Series win. He remained with the team the following year, expanding his schedule to include standalone ARCA Menards Series events.

== Early life and family background ==
Robbie Kennealy was born on March 3, 2006, to Gary and Francesca Kennealy. He was born alongside a twin sister named Harley and a younger brother named Joey, the latter of whom is also a racing driver. He was educated at Sherman Thomas Charter School where he graduated in 2024.

== Racing career ==
=== Early racing career ===
Kennealy began racing quarter midgets at four and a half years old, racing quarter midgets for the following eight years. According to Kennealy, he began racing after a cousin introduced him to motorsports. Additionally, his twin sister began racing before him, stating that "once I saw her do it I quickly got myself wanting to race". During his time racing quarter midgets, raced against numerous prominent drivers on the American West Coast, including Tyler Reif, Toni Breidinger, Jesse Love, Jade Avedisian, among others. In 2019, Kennealy transitioned to racing junior late models for his family-owned team at the age of 13 after having won multiple track championships in quarter midgets. For the following two years, Kennealy and his family gradually expanded the team.

Nearing the end of 2021, Kennealy's race shop completely burned down in a fire due to an electrical issue. According to Kennealy, almost all of his racing equipment was destroyed, including one racecar, a motorhome, and all equipment inside of the shop. Kennealy estimated that he lost approximately "90 to 95 percent" of his the team's racing assets. After the incident, John Keller, father of racing driver Kyle Keller, offered Kennealy to drive a car under his development program, eventually joining the program and earning various late model victories with the organization in the next couple years. In 2022, Kennealy finished second in Madera Speedway's Junior Pro Late Models division, losing a tie-breaker to Ethan Nascimento.

=== ARCA ===
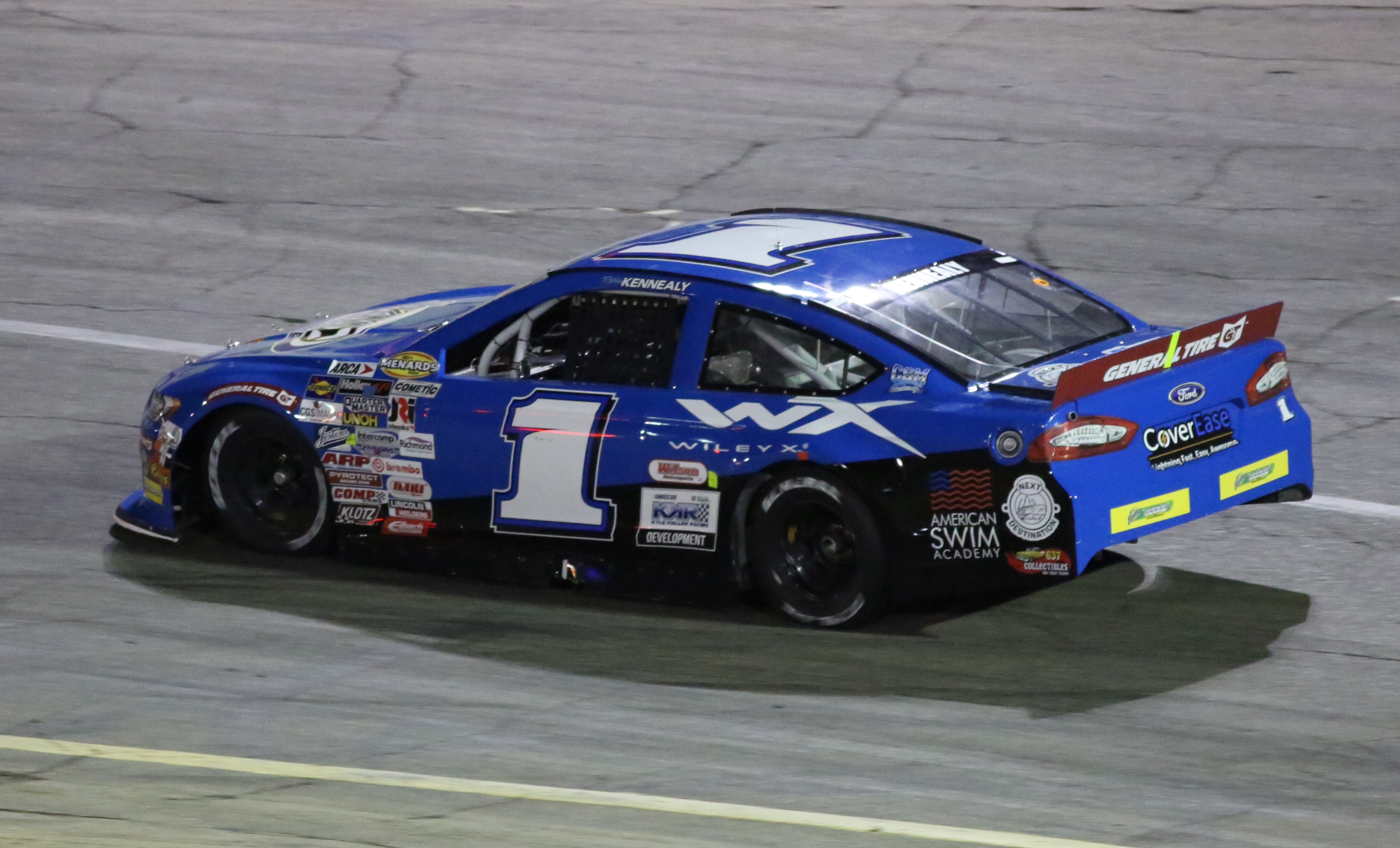
Kennealy's car at All American Speedway in 2023.

Kennealy made his debut in the regional ARCA Menards West Series on July 1, 2023, at the series' sixth round of the season at Irwindale Speedway in a family-owned car. In his debut, Kennealy finished in fifth, describing the race as an "awesome weekend", stating that "I would’ve been happy just finishing all the laps in the race. Top five wasn’t even a thought in my head before the race." Kennealy later raced the final four races of the West Series season, obtaining one additional top-ten at the Bullring at Las Vegas Motor Speedway. Additionally, he failed to finish two races due to damages sustained in crashes or accidents.

Kennealy initially announced plans to race full-time for the 2024 ARCA Menards West Series season, forming a merger with Keller Motorsports to race under Kennealy Keller Motorsports (KKM), owned by Kennealy's mother, Francesca, and sister, Harley. Both Robbie and Kyle handled the day-to-day operations of the organization. During the season, Kennealy was described by motorsports writer Brandon White to have suffered "plenty of growing pains". White described the beginning of the season as "inconsistent", with Kennealy failing to finish within the top-ten in any of the season's races. The team additionally experienced two engine failures in the first five races, including the second round at Kevin Harvick's Kern Raceway and the fifth round at Irwindale Speedway. On September 30, Kennealy's father, Gary, passed away suddenly due to a heart attack. After Gary's passing, Kennealy briefly became a motorsports crew member for his brother, Joey. Due to both the engine failures and Gary's passing, KKM folded before the season concluded.

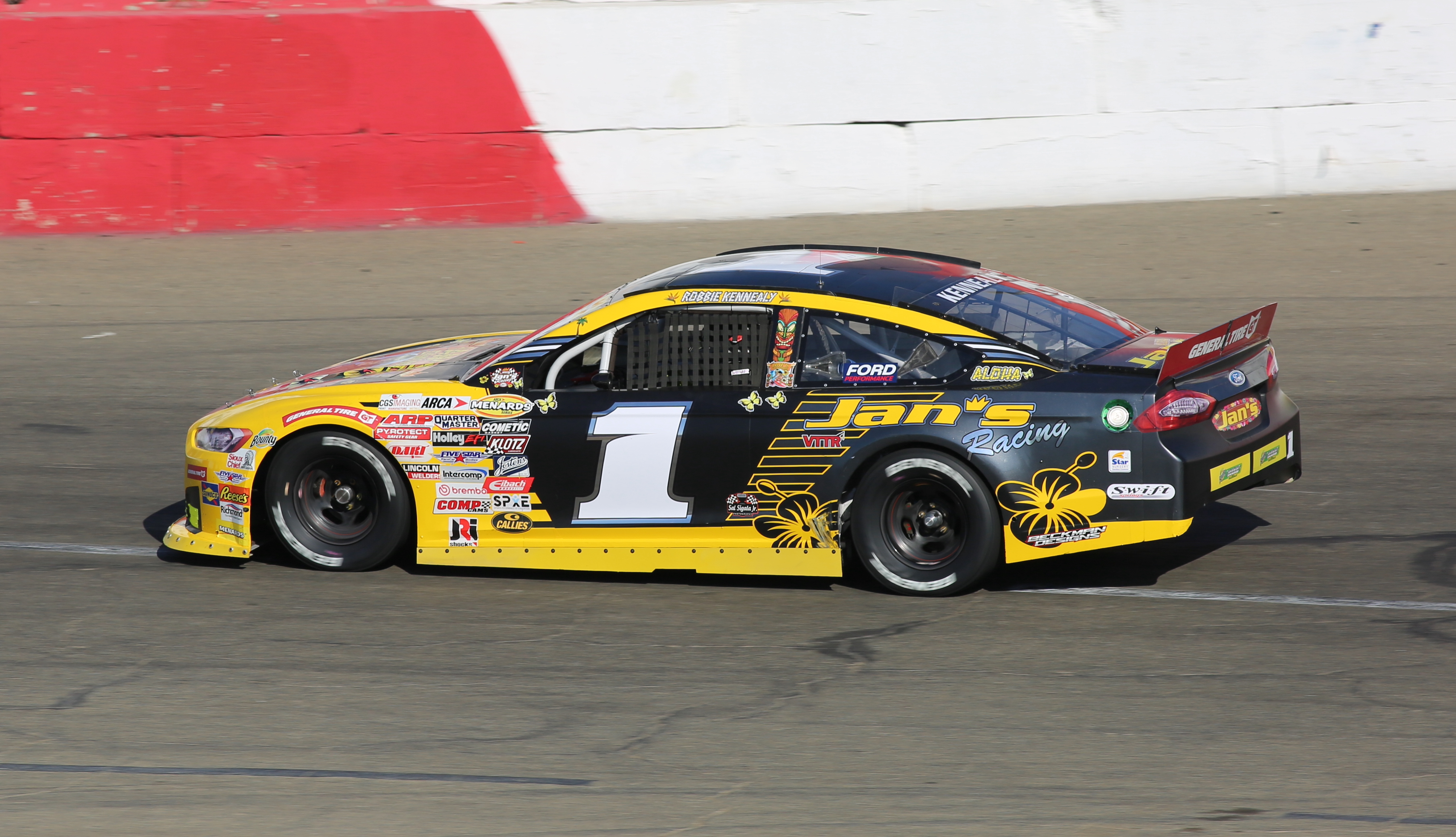
Kennealy's car at All American Speedway in 2025, where he won his first career West Series win.

During his time as a crew member, Kennealy was introduced to California towing truck company owner Jan Qualkenbush, owner of West Series team Jan's Towing Racing, by Keller, who had previously connected with Qualkenbush at Madera Speedway. After building a professional relationship, Kennealy signed with Jan's Towing Racing for the full-time 2025 West Series season. Kennealy improved significantly from the previous season. Throughout the 12-race season, Kennealy finished in the top-ten in all but two races, with only one retirement at Sonoma due to an accident involving himself crashing into Rodd Kneeland's car. At the ninth round at All American Speedway, Kennealy both won his first career pole in the West Series and his first West Series race. The race, occurring on September 14, took place almost a year after his father's passing, whom he dedicated the win towards. At season's end, Kennealy finished third in the driver's point standings, earning rookie of the year honors.

Kennealy's No. 1 car at All American Speedway in 2026

In 2026, Kennealy resigned for another full season in the West Series with Jan's Towing Racing, taking on an additional mentorship role for newly-signed teammate Cole Denton. In addition, he also announced plans to run select standalone national touring ARCA Menards Series races in a partnership entry between Jan's Racing and the Andy Hillenburg-owned Fast Track Racing, including the season-opener at Daytona, the third round at Kansas, and the fourth round at Talladega. In his first standalone ARCA Menards Series race at Daytona, Kennealy finished 15th. Although he went winless in ARCA West, Kennealy finished third in the standings on the strength of seven top-fives and twelve top-tens in thirteen races.

== Motorsports career results ==
=== Stock car career summary ===
Season	Series	Team	Races	Wins	Top 5	Top 10	Points	Position
2023	ARCA Menards Series West	3K Motorsports	5	0	1	2	207	15th
2024	ARCA Menards Series West	Kennealy Keller Motorsports	7	0	0	0	235	11th
2024	ARCA Menards Series	Kennealy Keller Motorsports	1	0	0	0	22	104th
2025	ARCA Menards Series West	Jan's Towing Racing	12	1	6	10	604	**3rd**
2025	ARCA Menards Series	Jan's Towing Racing	1	0	0	1	35	99th
2026	ARCA Menards Series West	Jan's Towing Racing	13	0	7	12	641	**3rd**
2026	ARCA Menards Series	Jan's Towing Racing	3	0	0	1	105	42nd
2026	ARCA Menards Series	Fast Track Racing	1	0	0	0	105	42nd

=== ARCA Menards Series ===
(key) (Bold – Pole position awarded by qualifying time. Italics – Pole position earned by points standings or practice time. * – Most laps led.)

ARCA Menards Series results
Year	Team	No.	Make	1	2	3	4	5	6	7	8	9	10	11	12	13	14	15	16	17	18	19	20	AMSC	Pts	Ref
2024	Kennealy Keller Motorsports	1	Ford	DAY	PHO; 22	TAL	DOV	KAN	CLT	IOW	MOH	BLN	IRP	SLM	ELK	MCH	ISF	MLW	DSF	GLN	BRI	KAN	TOL	104th	22	
2025	Jan's Towing Racing	1	Ford	DAY	PHO; 9	TAL	KAN	CLT	MCH	BLN	ELK	LRP	DOV	IRP	IOW	GLN	ISF	MAD	DSF	BRI	SLM	KAN	TOL	99th	35	
2026	Jan's Towing Racing	41	Ford	DAY; 15	PHO; 10		TAL; 21	GLN	TOL	MCH	POC	BER	ELK	CHI	LRP	IRP	IOW	ISF	MAD	DSF	SLM	BRI	KAN	42nd	105	
2026	Fast Track Racing	11	Chevy			KAN; 25																		42nd	105	

==== ARCA Menards Series West ====
ARCA Menards Series West results
Year	Team	No.	Make	1	2	3	4	5	6	7	8	9	10	11	12	13	AMSWC	Pts	Ref
2023	3K Motorsports	1	Ford	PHO	IRW	KCR	PIR	SON	IRW; 5	SHA	EVG	AAS; 16	LVS; 8	MAD; 16			15th	207	
2023	3K Motorsports	11	Ford												PHO; 18		15th	207	
2024	Kennealy Keller Motorsports	1	Ford	PHO; 22	KER; 23			IRW; 18	IRW; Wth								11th	235	
2024	Kennealy Keller Motorsports	1	Chevy			PIR; 13	SON; 17										11th	235	
2024	Kennealy Keller Motorsports	11	Chevy							SHA; 13	TRI	MAD; 17	AAS	KER	PHO		11th	235	
2025	Jan's Towing Racing	9	Ford	KER; 4													3rd	604	
2025	Jan's Towing Racing	1	Ford		PHO; 9	TUC; 7	CNS; 6	KER; 3	SON; 21	TRI; 4	PIR; 12	**AAS**; 1**	MAD; 4	LVS; 3	PHO; 6		3rd	604	
2026	Jan's Towing Racing	1	Ford	KER; 20		TUC; 4	SHA; 5	**CNS**; 2	TRI; 4	SON; 7	PIR; 7	AAS; 4	MAD; 4	LVS; 2	PHO; 10	KER; 6	3rd	641	
2026	Jan's Towing Racing	41	Ford		PHO; 10												3rd	641	
