= 2025 NAPA Auto Parts 150 (Kern Raceway) =

5th race of the 2025 ARCA Menards Series West

2025 NAPA Auto Parts 150 presented by West Coast Stock Car Motorsports Hall of Fame
Race details
- Race 5 of 12 of the 2025 ARCA Menards Series West
- Date: June 14, 2025
- Official name: 10th Annual NAPA Auto Parts 150 presented by West Coast Stock Car Motorsports Hall of Fame
- Location: Kevin Harvick's Kern Raceway in Bakersfield, California
- Course: Permanent racing facility
- Course length: 0.50 miles (0.80 km)
- Distance: 150 laps, 75 mi (120 km)
- Scheduled distance: 150 laps, 75 mi (120 km)
- Average speed: 68.632 mph (110.452 km/h)

Pole position
Driver	Kyle Keller	Jan's Towing Racing
- Time: 18.591

Most laps led
Driver	Trevor Huddleston	High Point Racing
- Laps: 62

Winner
No. 50	Trevor Huddleston	High Point Racing

Television in the United States
- Network: FloRacing
- Announcers: Charles Krall

Radio in the United States
- Radio: ARCA Racing Network

The 2025 NAPA Auto Parts 150 presented by West Coast Stock Car Motorsports Hall of Fame was the 5th stock car race of the 2025 ARCA Menards Series West season, and the 10th running of the event. The race was held on Saturday, June 14, 2025, at Kevin Harvick's Kern Raceway in Bakersfield, California, a 0.50 mile (0.80 km) permanent asphalt quad-oval shaped short track. The race took the scheduled 150 laps to complete. Trevor Huddleston, driving for High Point Racing, would make his way to the front from the rear of the field, and led the final 62 laps, holding off Kyle Keller in a similar fashion to the previous Kern race to earn his seventh career ARCA Menards Series West win, and his second of the season. To fill out the podium, Robbie Kennealy, driving for Jan's Towing Racing, would finish in third, respectively.

== Report ==
=== Background ===
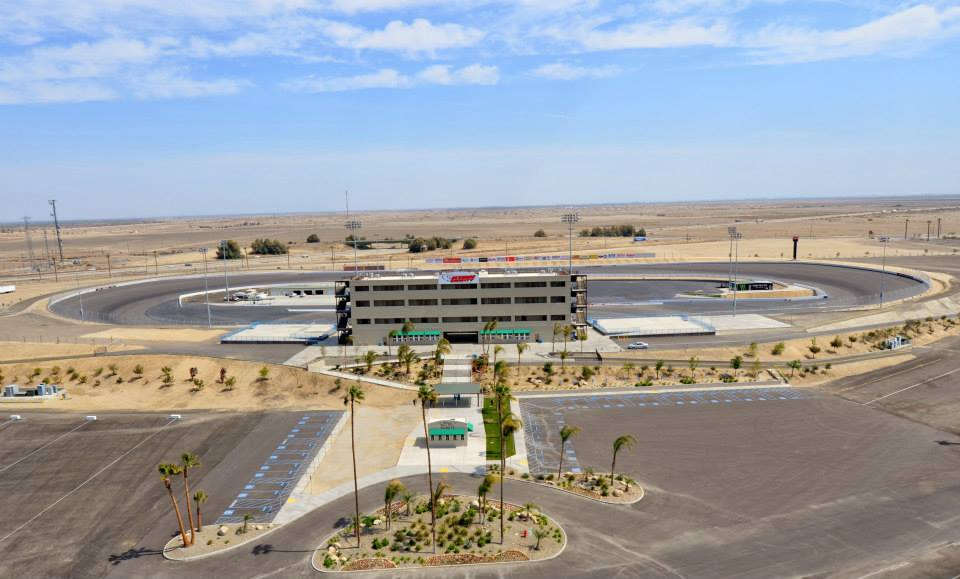
Kevin Harvick's Kern Raceway, the track where the race will be held.

Kevin Harvick's Kern Raceway (formerly Kern County Raceway Park) is a 0.5-mile (0.80 km) oval speedway located on CA 43 (Enos Lane) just off Interstate 5 in Bakersfield, Kern County, California, United States. Opened in 2013, it was built as a replacement for Mesa Marin Raceway.

Kevin Harvick's Kern Raceway hosts events with NASCAR's Whelen All-American Series along with an ARCA Menards Series West race since 2013.

The track has banks of 8° in the straightaways, with 14° paved corners. The track has 15,000 seats for fans, and room to expand to 17,000 seats for various events. It also contains 21 suites in the grandstand along with 18 concession stands.

==== Entry list ====
- (R) denotes rookie driver.

#	Driver	Team	Make	Sponsor
1	Robbie Kennealy (R)	Jan's Towing Racing	Ford	Jan's Towing
3	Todd Souza	Central Coast Racing	Toyota	Central Coast Cabinets
05	David Smith	Shockwave Motorsports	Toyota	Shockwave Marine Suspension Seating
5	Eric Johnson Jr.	Jerry Pitts Racing	Toyota	Sherwin-Williams
6	Buddy Shepherd	Jerry Pitts Racing	Toyota	Hall Ambulance
9	Joey Kennealy	Jan's Towing Racing	Ford	Jan's Towing
13	Tanner Reif	Central Coast Racing	Toyota	Central Coast Cabinets
19	Jake Bollman (R)	Bill McAnally Racing	Chevrolet	NAPA Auto Care
23	Jaron Giannini	Sigma Performance Services	Toyota	Versatile & Stone
50	Trevor Huddleston	High Point Racing	Ford	High Point Racing / Racecar Factory
51	Blake Lothian (R)	Strike Mamba Racing	Chevrolet	Texas Lawbook
55	Andrew Chapman	High Point Racing	Ford	High Point Racing / Racecar Factory
68	P. J. Pedroncelli	Rodd Racing	Chevrolet	Pedroncelli Mobile Bottling / Rodd Renovations
71	Kyle Keller	Jan's Towing Racing	Ford	Jan's Towing
72	Jonathan Reaume	Strike Mamba Racing	Chevrolet	RBR Engineering
Official entry list

== Practice ==
The first and only practice session was held on Saturday, June 14, at 3:00 PM PST, and would last for 60 minutes. Tanner Reif, driving for Central Coast Racing, would set the fastest time in the session, with a lap of 18.751, and a speed of 95.995 mph (154.489 km/h).

Pos.	#	Driver	Team	Make	Time	Speed
1	13	Tanner Reif	Central Coast Racing	Toyota	18.751	95.995
2	71	Kyle Keller	Jan's Towing Racing	Ford	18.795	95.770
3	1	Robbie Kennealy (R)	Jan's Towing Racing	Ford	18.957	94.952
Full practice results

== Qualifying ==
Qualifying was held on Saturday, June 14, at 4:20 PM PST. The qualifying system used is a multi-car, multi-lap based system. All drivers will be on track for a 20-minute timed session, and whoever sets the fastest time in that session will win the pole.

Kyle Keller, driving for Jan's Towing Racing, would score the pole for the race, with a lap of 18.591, and a speed of 96.821 mph (155.818 km/h).

=== Qualifying results ===
Pos.	#	Driver	Team	Make	Time	Speed
1	71	Kyle Keller	Jan's Towing Racing	Ford	18.591	96.821
2	19	Jake Bollman (R)	Bill McAnally Racing	Chevrolet	18.785	95.821
3	13	Tanner Reif	Central Coast Racing	Toyota	18.833	95.577
4	1	Robbie Kennealy (R)	Jan's Towing Racing	Ford	18.840	95.541
5	6	Buddy Shepherd	Jerry Pitts Racing	Toyota	18.872	95.379
6	68	P. J. Pedroncelli	Rodd Racing	Chevrolet	18.894	95.268
7	23	Jaron Giannini	Sigma Performance Services	Toyota	19.012	94.677
8	9	Joey Kennealy	Jan's Towing Racing	Ford	19.071	94.384
9	5	Eric Johnson Jr.	Jerry Pitts Racing	Toyota	19.129	94.098
10	3	Todd Souza	Central Coast Racing	Toyota	19.183	93.833
11	51	Blake Lothian (R)	Strike Mamba Racing	Chevrolet	19.267	93.424
12	55	Andrew Chapman	High Point Racing	Ford	19.279	93.366
13	05	David Smith	Shockwave Motorsports	Toyota	20.672	87.074
14	72	Jonathan Reaume	Strike Mamba Racing	Chevrolet	21.320	84.428
15	50	Trevor Huddleston	High Point Racing	Ford	–	–
Official qualifying results

== Race results ==
Fin	St	#	Driver	Team	Make	Laps	Led	Status	Pts
1	15	50	Trevor Huddleston	High Point Racing	Ford	150	62	Running	98
2	1	71	Kyle Keller	Jan's Towing Racing	Ford	150	1	Running	94
3	4	1	Robbie Kennealy (R)	Jan's Towing Racing	Ford	150	0	Running	91
4	3	13	Tanner Reif	Central Coast Racing	Toyota	150	38	Running	91
5	9	5	Eric Johnson Jr.	Jerry Pitts Racing	Toyota	150	0	Running	89
6	12	55	Andrew Chapman	High Point Racing	Ford	150	0	Running	38
7	7	23	Jaron Giannini	Sigma Performance Services	Toyota	150	0	Running	37
8	14	72	Jonathan Reaume	Strike Mamba Racing	Chevrolet	150	0	Running	36
9	11	51	Blake Lothian (R)	Strike Mamba Racing	Chevrolet	149	0	Running	85
10	6	68	P. J. Pedroncelli	Rodd Racing	Chevrolet	145	0	Accident	34
11	13	05	David Smith	Shockwave Motorsports	Toyota	143	0	Running	83
12	2	19	Jake Bollman (R)	Bill McAnally Racing	Chevrolet	140	49	Running	33
13	10	3	Todd Souza	Central Coast Racing	Toyota	129	0	Accident	31
14	8	9	Joey Kennealy	Jan's Towing Racing	Ford	128	0	Accident	30
15	5	6	Buddy Shepherd	Jerry Pitts Racing	Toyota	102	0	Suspension	29
Official race results

== Standings after the race ==
Drivers' Championship standings

	Pos	Driver	Points
	1	Trevor Huddleston	259
	2	Tanner Reif	250 (–9)
1	3	Kyle Keller	248 (–11)
1	4	Eric Johnson Jr.	244 (–15)
	5	Robbie Kennealy	241 (–18)
	6	Blake Lothian	216 (–43)
	7	David Smith	197 (–62)
	8	Jake Bollman	145 (–114)
1	9	Todd Souza	106 (–153)
1	10	Cody Dennison	98 (–161)

- Note: Only the first 10 positions are included for the driver standings.

Previous race: 2025 Colorado 150	ARCA Menards Series West; 2025 season	Next race: 2025 General Tire 200 (Sonoma)
