= 2025 General Tire 150 (Phoenix) =

2nd race of the 2024 ARCA Menards Series

Race details
- Race 2 of 20 of the 2025 ARCA Menards Series; Race 2 of 12 of the 2025 ARCA Menards Series West
- Date: March 7, 2025
- Official name: 6th Annual General Tire 150
- Location: Phoenix Raceway in Avondale, Arizona
- Course: Permanent racing facility
- Course length: 1 miles (1.6 km)
- Distance: 165 laps, 165 mi (265 km)
- Scheduled distance: 150 laps, 150 mi (240 km)
- Average speed: 90.408 mph (145.498 km/h)

Pole position
Driver	Brent Crews	Joe Gibbs Racing
- Grid positions set by competition-based formula

Most laps led
Driver	Brenden Queen	Pinnacle Racing Group
- Laps: 95

Winner
No. 18	Brent Crews	Joe Gibbs Racing

Television in the United States
- Network: FS1
- Announcers: Eric Brennan, Phil Parsons and Regan Smith

Radio in the United States
- Radio: MRN

The 2025 General Tire 150 was the second stock car race of the 2025 ARCA Menards Series season, the second race of the 2025 ARCA Menards Series West season, and the 6th running of the event. The race was held on Friday, March 7, 2025, at Phoenix Raceway in Avondale, Arizona, a 1-mile (1.6 km) permanent asphalt tri-oval shaped speedway. The race was originally scheduled to be contested over 150 laps, but was increased to 165 laps due to multiple overtime restarts. In a wild finish, Brent Crews, driving for Joe Gibbs Racing, made a last lap pass on Brenden Queen to earn his third career ARCA Menards Series win, his first career ARCA Menards Series West win, and his first win of the season. Crews and Queen dominated the entire race, leading nearly every lap of the event, with Queen leading a race-high 95 laps. To fill out the podium, Treyten Lapcevich, driving for Venturini Motorsports, would finish in 3rd, respectively.

== Report ==
=== Background ===
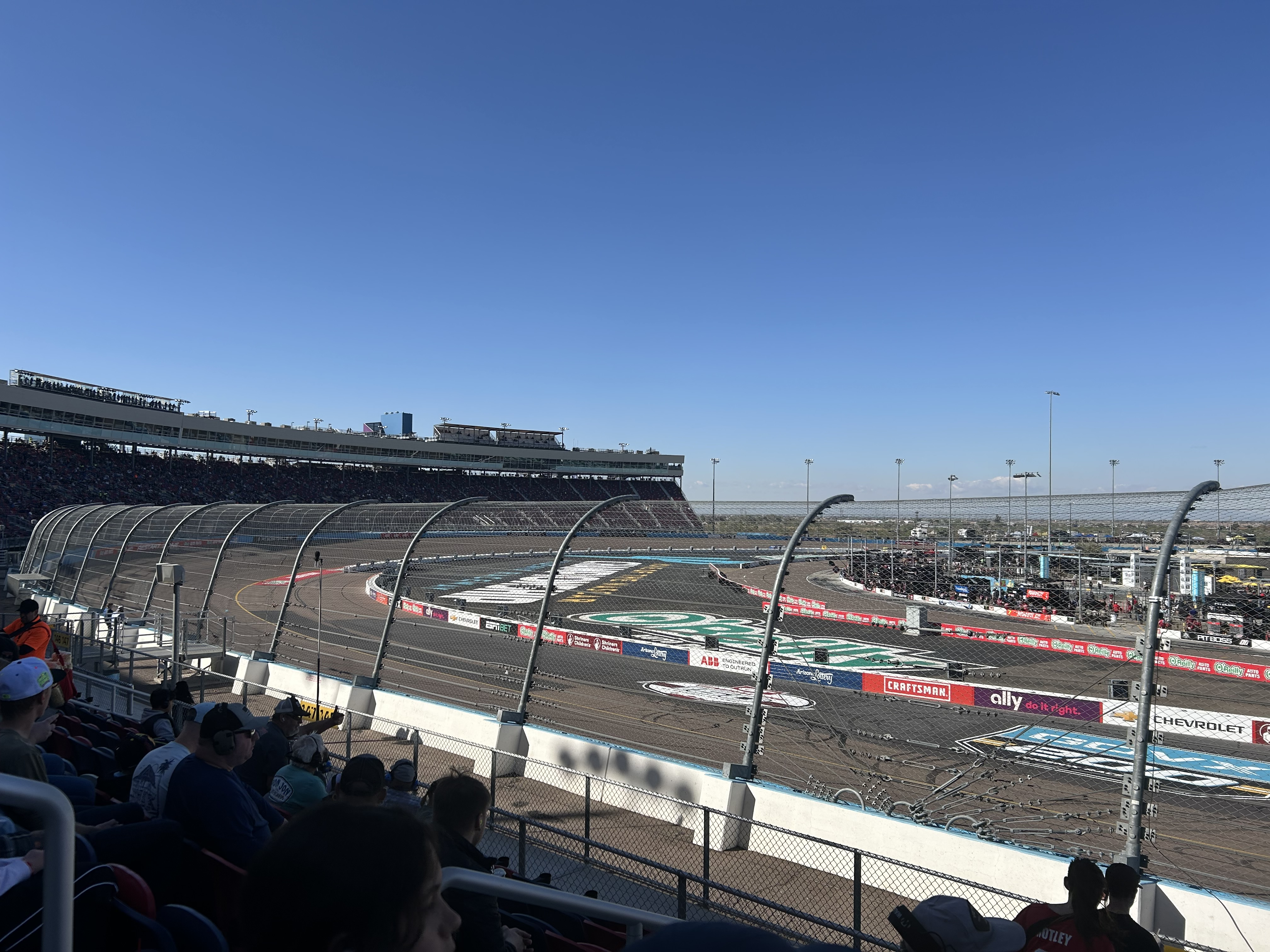
Phoenix Raceway, the track where the race was held.

Phoenix Raceway is a 1-mile, low-banked tri-oval race track located in Avondale, Arizona, near Phoenix. The motorsport track opened in 1964 and currently hosts two NASCAR race weekends annually including the final championship race since 2020. Phoenix Raceway has also hosted the CART, IndyCar Series, USAC and the WeatherTech SportsCar Championship. The raceway is currently owned and operated by NASCAR.

The raceway was originally constructed with a 2.5 mi (4.0 km) road course that ran both inside and outside of the main tri-oval. In 1991 the track was reconfigured with the current 1.51 mi (2.43 km) interior layout. PIR has an estimated grandstand seating capacity of around 67,000. Lights were installed around the track in 2004 following the addition of a second annual NASCAR race weekend.

Phoenix Raceway is home to two annual NASCAR race weekends, one of 13 facilities on the NASCAR schedule to host more than one race weekend a year. The track is both the first and last stop in the western United States, as well as the fourth and the last track on the schedule.

==== Entry list ====
- (R) denotes rookie driver.

#	Driver	Team	Make	Sponsor
1	Robbie Kennealy	Jan's Towing Racing	Ford	Jan's Towing
03	Alex Clubb	Clubb Racing Inc.	Ford	Yavapai Bottle Gas / Race Parts Liquidators
3	Adrián Ferrer (R)	Central Coast Racing	Toyota	Central Coast Cabinets
05	David Smith	Shockwave Motorsports	Toyota	Shockwave Marine Suspension Seating
5	Eric Johnson Jr.	Jerry Pitts Racing	Toyota	Sherwin-Williams
06	Brayton Laster (R)	Wayne Peterson Racing	Toyota	AutoRepairVINStickers.com
6	Lavar Scott	Rev Racing	Chevrolet	Max Siegel Inc.
9	Tony Cosentino	Fast Track Racing	Toyota	Universal Technical Institute
10	Brad Perez	Fast Track Racing	Ford	Fast Track Racing / UTI
11	Cody Dennison	Fast Track Racing	Toyota	Timcast / Flux
12	Tim Monroe	Fast Track Racing	Ford	PVW / Universal Technical Institute
13	Tanner Reif	Central Coast Racing	Toyota	Central Coast Cabinets
15	Treyten Lapcevich	Venturini Motorsports	Toyota	Bare Knuckle Fighting Championship
18	Brent Crews	Joe Gibbs Racing	Toyota	JBL
19	Jake Bollman	Bill McAnally Racing	Chevrolet	NAPA Auto Care
20	Lawless Alan	Venturini Motorsports	Toyota	AutoParkIt.com
23	Tyler Reif	Sigma Performance Services	Chevrolet	SPS / Vegas Fastener Manufacturing
25	Patrick Staropoli	Venturini Motorsports	Toyota	Syfovre
28	Brenden Queen (R)	Pinnacle Racing Group	Chevrolet	BestRepair.net
31	Tim Viens	Rise Motorsports	Toyota	GoHitchGo
46	Thad Moffitt	Nitro Motorsports	Toyota	Pristine Auction
48	Brad Smith	Brad Smith Motorsports	Ford	Gary's Speed Shop
50	Trevor Huddleston	High Point Racing	Ford	High Point Racing / Racecar Factory
51	Blake Lothian (R)	Strike Mamba Racing	Chevrolet	Texas Lawbook
55	Isabella Robusto (R)	Venturini Motorsports	Toyota	Mobil 1
67	Ryan Vargas	Maples Motorsports	Chevrolet	Maples Motorsports
71	Kyle Keller	Jan's Towing Racing	Ford	Jan's Towing / Argus Construction
72	Jonathan Reaume	Strike Mamba Racing	Chevrolet	RBR Engineering
73	Andy Jankowiak	KLAS Motorsports	Toyota	Phillips 66 Lubricants
76	Kole Raz	AM Racing	Ford	Cyclum Nextgen Travel Centers
77	Corey Day	Spire Motorsports	Chevrolet	HendrickCars.com
86	Alex Malycke	Clubb Racing Inc.	Ford	Sons of Ecstasy / ourthing.tv
97	Jason Kitzmiller	CR7 Motorsports	Chevrolet	A.L.L. Construction
99	Michael Maples	Maples Motorsports	Chevrolet	Don Ray Petroleum / Maples Motorsports
Official entry list

== Starting lineup ==
Practice and qualifying were originally scheduled to be held on Friday, March 7, at 2:30 PM and 3:30 PM MST, but were both cancelled due to inclement weather. The starting lineup was determined by last season's owners' points (including 2024 West Series points). As a result, Brent Crews, driving for Joe Gibbs Racing, was awarded the pole.

=== Starting lineup ===
Pos.	#	Driver	Team	Make
1	18	Brent Crews	Joe Gibbs Racing	Toyota
2	13	Tanner Reif	Central Coast Racing	Toyota
3	50	Trevor Huddleston	High Point Racing	Ford
4	20	Lawless Alan	Venturini Motorsports	Toyota
5	6	Lavar Scott	Rev Racing	Chevrolet
6	23	Tyler Reif	Sigma Performance Services	Chevrolet
7	19	Jake Bollman	Bill McAnally Racing	Chevrolet
8	55	Isabella Robusto (R)	Venturini Motorsports	Toyota
9	28	Brenden Queen (R)	Pinnacle Racing Group	Chevrolet
10	71	Kyle Keller	Jan's Towing Racing	Ford
11	3	Adrián Ferrer (R)	Central Coast Racing	Toyota
12	25	Patrick Staropoli	Venturini Motorsports	Toyota
13	46	Thad Moffitt	Nitro Motorsports	Toyota
14	05	David Smith	Shockwave Motorsports	Toyota
15	5	Eric Johnson Jr.	Jerry Pitts Racing	Toyota
16	76	Kole Raz	AM Racing	Ford
17	11	Cody Dennison	Fast Track Racing	Toyota
18	15	Treyten Lapcevich	Venturini Motorsports	Toyota
19	1	Robbie Kennealy	Jan's Towing Racing	Ford
20	9	Tony Cosentino	Fast Track Racing	Toyota
21	12	Tim Monroe	Fast Track Racing	Ford
22	10	Brad Perez	Fast Track Racing	Ford
23	03	Alex Clubb	Clubb Racing Inc.	Ford
24	06	Brayton Laster (R)	Wayne Peterson Racing	Toyota
25	31	Tim Viens	Rise Motorsports	Toyota
26	99	Michael Maples	Maples Motorsports	Chevrolet
27	48	Brad Smith	Brad Smith Motorsports	Ford
28	73	Andy Jankowiak	KLAS Motorsports	Toyota
29	77	Corey Day	Spire Motorsports	Chevrolet
30	97	Jason Kitzmiller	CR7 Motorsports	Chevrolet
31	86	Alex Malycke	Clubb Racing Inc.	Ford
32	67	Ryan Vargas	Maples Motorsports	Chevrolet
33	51	Blake Lothian (R)	Strike Mamba Racing	Chevrolet
34	72	Jonathan Reaume	Strike Mamba Racing	Chevrolet
Official starting lineup

== Race results ==
Fin	St	#	Driver	Team	Make	Laps	Led	Status	Pts
1	1	18	Brent Crews	Joe Gibbs Racing	Toyota	165	68	Running	47
2	9	28	Brenden Queen (R)	Pinnacle Racing Group	Chevrolet	165	95	Running	44
3	18	15	Treyten Lapcevich	Venturini Motorsports	Toyota	165	0	Running	41
4	4	20	Lawless Alan	Venturini Motorsports	Toyota	165	0	Running	40
5	5	6	Lavar Scott	Rev Racing	Chevrolet	165	0	Running	39
6	16	76	Kole Raz	AM Racing	Ford	165	0	Running	38
7	13	46	Thad Moffitt	Nitro Motorsports	Toyota	165	0	Running	37
8	12	25	Patrick Staropoli	Venturini Motorsports	Toyota	165	0	Running	36
9	19	1	Robbie Kennealy	Jan's Towing Racing	Ford	165	0	Running	35
10	29	77	Corey Day	Spire Motorsports	Chevrolet	165	0	Running	34
11	15	5	Eric Johnson Jr.	Jerry Pitts Racing	Toyota	164	0	Running	33
12	3	50	Trevor Huddleston	High Point Racing	Ford	164	0	Running	32
13	2	13	Tanner Reif	Central Coast Racing	Toyota	164	0	Running	31
14	28	73	Andy Jankowiak	KLAS Motorsports	Ford	163	0	Running	30
15	10	71	Kyle Keller	Jan's Towing Racing	Ford	161	0	Running	29
16	17	11	Cody Dennison	Fast Track Racing	Toyota	160	0	Running	28
17	33	51	Blake Lothian (R)	Strike Mamba Racing	Chevrolet	158	0	Running	27
18	11	3	Adrián Ferrer (R)	Central Coast Racing	Toyota	157	0	Running	26
19	6	23	Tyler Reif	Sigma Performance Services	Chevrolet	156	2	Accident	26
20	25	31	Tim Viens	Rise Motorsports	Toyota	155	0	Running	24
21	26	99	Michael Maples	Maples Motorsports	Chevrolet	154	0	Running	23
22	24	06	Brayton Laster (R)	Wayne Peterson Racing	Toyota	151	0	Running	22
23	21	12	Tim Monroe	Fast Track Racing	Ford	145	0	Running	21
24	7	19	Jake Bollman	Bill McAnally Racing	Chevrolet	143	0	Running	20
25	34	72	Jonathan Reaume	Strike Mamba Racing	Chevrolet	124	0	Running	19
26	20	9	Tony Cosentino	Fast Track Racing	Toyota	81	0	Wheel Stud	18
27	30	97	Jason Kitzmiller	CR7 Motorsports	Chevrolet	38	0	Accident	17
28	23	03	Alex Clubb	Clubb Racing Inc.	Ford	30	0	Oil Pan	16
29	14	05	David Smith	Shockwave Motorsports	Toyota	28	0	Accident	15
30	22	10	Brad Perez	Fast Track Racing	Ford	24	0	Brakes	14
31	8	55	Isabella Robusto (R)	Venturini Motorsports	Toyota	19	0	Oil Leak	13
32	32	67	Ryan Vargas	Maples Motorsports	Chevrolet	13	0	Quit	12
33	27	48	Brad Smith	Brad Smith Motorsports	Ford	8	0	Handling	11
34	31	86	Alex Malycke	Clubb Racing Inc.	Ford	0	0	DNS	10
Official race results

== Standings after the race ==
Drivers' Championship standings (ARCA Main)

	Pos	Driver	Points
	1	Brenden Queen	90
2	2	Lavar Scott	79 (-11)
3	3	Kole Raz	76 (–14)
14	4	Lawless Alan	67 (–23)
3	5	Andy Jankowiak	66 (–24)
3	6	Jason Kitzmiller	58 (–32)
15	7	Corey Day	56 (–34)
11	8	Tim Viens	49 (–41)
	9	Brent Crews	47 (–43)
27	10	Thad Moffitt	44 (–46)

Drivers' Championship standings (ARCA West)

	Pos	Driver	Points
	1	Trevor Huddleston	80
2	2	Robbie Kennealy	75 (-5)
	3	Tanner Reif	73 (–7)
1	4	Eric Johnson Jr.	72 (–8)
3	5	Kyle Keller	71 (–9)
2	6	Cody Dennison	64 (–16)
	7	Adrián Ferrer	63 (–17)
3	8	Blake Lothian	60 (–20)
1	9	David Smith	49 (–31)
	10	Brent Crews	47 (–33)

- Note: Only the first 10 positions are included for the driver standings.

Previous race: 2025 Ride the 'Dente 200	ARCA Menards Series; 2025 season	Next race: 2025 General Tire 200 (Talladega)

Previous race: 2025 West Coast Stock Car Motorsports Hall of Fame 150	ARCA Menards Series West; 2025 season	Next race: 2025 ARCA Menards Series West 150
