= 2025 UNOH 250 =

20th race of the 2025 NASCAR Craftsman Truck Series

2025 UNOH 250 presented by Ohio Logistics
Race details
- Race 20 of 25 of the 2025 NASCAR Craftsman Truck Series
- Date: September 11, 2025
- Location: Bristol Motor Speedway in Bristol, Tennessee
- Course: Permanent racing facility
- Course length: 0.533 miles (0.858 km)
- Distance: 250 laps, 133 mi (214 km)
- Scheduled distance: 250 laps, 133 mi (214 km)
- Average speed: 91.163 mph (146.713 km/h)

Pole position
Driver	Jake Garcia	ThorSport Racing
- Time: 15.249

Most laps led
Driver	Corey Heim	Tricon Garage
- Laps: 122

Winner
No. 34	Layne Riggs	Front Row Motorsports

Television in the United States
- Network: FS1
- Announcers: Jamie Little, Kevin Harvick, and Joey Logano

Radio in the United States
- Radio: NRN

The 2025 UNOH 250 presented by Ohio Logistics was the 20th stock car race of the 2025 NASCAR Craftsman Truck Series, the second race of the Round of 10, and the 28th iteration of the event. The race was held on Thursday, September 11, 2025, at Bristol Motor Speedway in Bristol, Tennessee, a 0.533 miles (0.858 km) permanent oval shaped racetrack. The race took the scheduled 250 laps to complete.

Layne Riggs, driving for Front Row Motorsports, would overcome from a first-lap spin, and dominated the final stage of the race, leading the final 110 laps to earn his fifth career NASCAR Craftsman Truck Series win, and his third of the season. He would also advance into the next round of the playoffs. To fill out the podium, Ben Rhodes, driving for ThorSport Racing, and Corey Heim, driving for Tricon Garage, would finish 2nd and 3rd, respectively.

== Report ==
=== Background ===
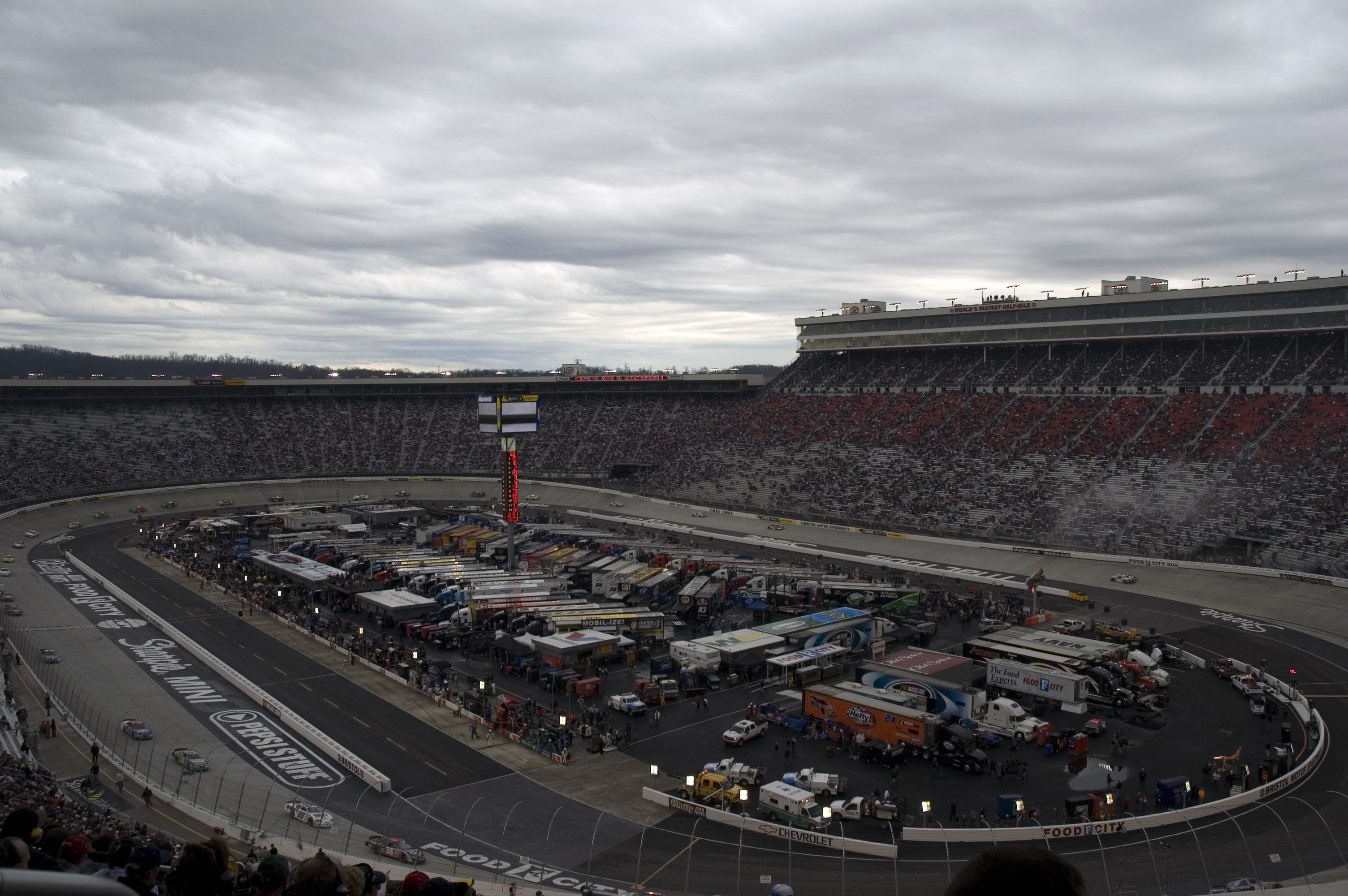
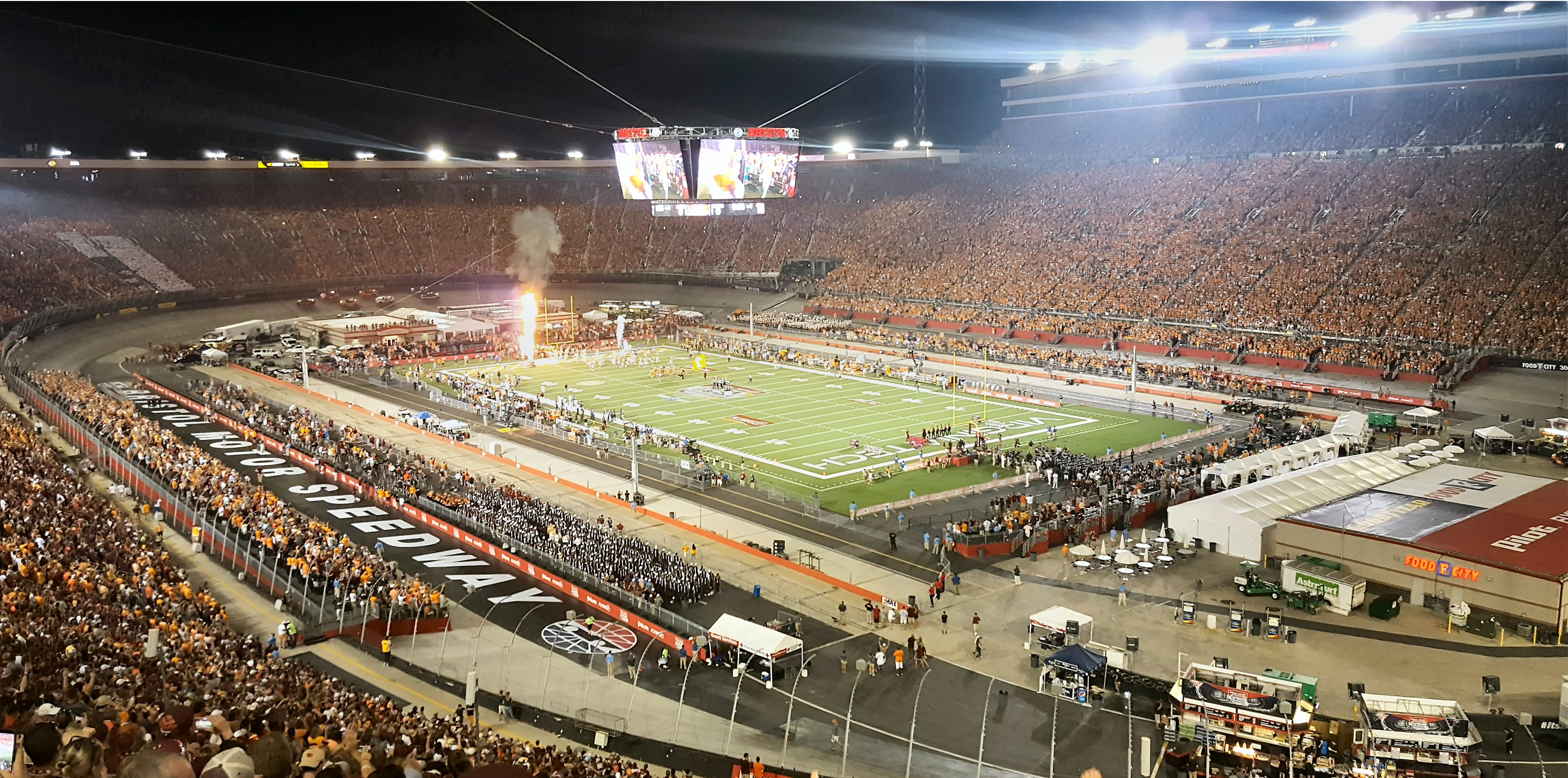
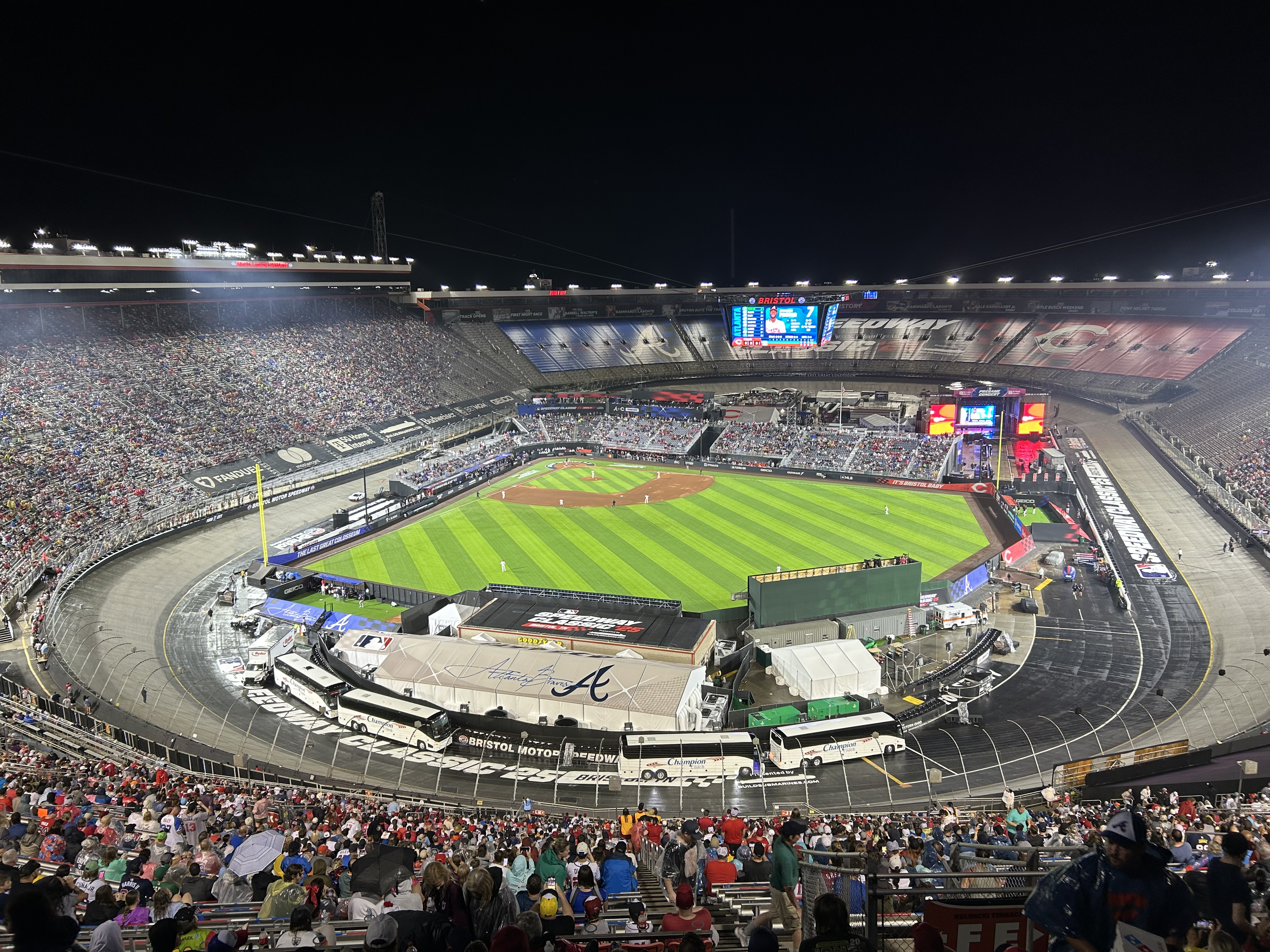
The Track (left) the Battle at Bristol (center) and the MLB Speedway Classic (right), are all events previously held at Bristol Motor Speedway.

The Bristol Motor Speedway, formerly known as Bristol International Raceway and Bristol Raceway, is a NASCAR short track venue located in Bristol, Tennessee. Constructed in 1960, it held its first NASCAR race on July 30, 1961. Despite its short length, Bristol is among the most popular tracks on the NASCAR schedule because of its distinct features, which include extraordinarily steep banking, an all concrete surface, two pit roads, and stadium-like seating. It has also been named one of the loudest NASCAR tracks.

Besides holding racing events, the track has hosted the Battle at Bristol, a college football game between the Tennessee Volunteers and Virginia Tech Hokies on September 10, 2016 and the MLB Speedway Classic, an MLB baseball game between the Atlanta Braves and the Cincinnati Reds from August 2-3, 2025.

=== Entry list ===
- (R) denotes rookie driver.
- (i) denotes driver who is ineligible for series driver points.
- (P) denotes playoff driver.
- (OP) denotes owner's playoff truck.

#	Driver	Team	Make
1	Brent Crews	Tricon Garage	Toyota
02	Treyten Lapcevich	Young's Motorsports	Chevrolet
2	Clayton Green	Reaume Brothers Racing	Ford
5	Toni Breidinger (R)	Tricon Garage	Toyota
6	Norm Benning	Norm Benning Racing	Chevrolet
7	Corey Day (i) (OP)	Spire Motorsports	Chevrolet
9	Grant Enfinger (P)	CR7 Motorsports	Chevrolet
11	Corey Heim (P)	Tricon Garage	Toyota
13	Jake Garcia (P)	ThorSport Racing	Ford
15	Tanner Gray	Tricon Garage	Toyota
17	Gio Ruggiero (R)	Tricon Garage	Toyota
18	Tyler Ankrum (P)	McAnally-Hilgemann Racing	Chevrolet
19	Daniel Hemric (P)	McAnally-Hilgemann Racing	Chevrolet
20	Stefan Parsons	Young's Motorsports	Chevrolet
22	Josh Reaume	Reaume Brothers Racing	Ford
26	Dawson Sutton (R)	Rackley W.A.R.	Chevrolet
33	Mason Maggio (i)	Reaume Brothers Racing	Ford
34	Layne Riggs (P)	Front Row Motorsports	Ford
35	Greg Van Alst	Greg Van Alst Motorsports	Toyota
38	Chandler Smith (P)	Front Row Motorsports	Ford
41	Conner Jones	Niece Motorsports	Chevrolet
42	Matt Mills	Niece Motorsports	Chevrolet
44	Andrés Pérez de Lara (R)	Niece Motorsports	Chevrolet
45	Bayley Currey	Niece Motorsports	Chevrolet
52	Kaden Honeycutt (P)	Halmar Friesen Racing	Toyota
62	Cole Butcher	Halmar Friesen Racing	Toyota
71	Rajah Caruth (P)	Spire Motorsports	Chevrolet
74	Caleb Costner	Mike Harmon Racing	Toyota
75	Parker Kligerman	Henderson Motorsports	Chevrolet
76	Spencer Boyd	Freedom Racing Enterprises	Chevrolet
77	Corey LaJoie	Spire Motorsports	Chevrolet
81	Connor Mosack (R)	McAnally-Hilgemann Racing	Chevrolet
88	Matt Crafton	ThorSport Racing	Ford
91	Jack Wood	McAnally-Hilgemann Racing	Chevrolet
95	Clay Greenfield	GK Racing	Chevrolet
98	Ty Majeski (P)	ThorSport Racing	Ford
99	Ben Rhodes	ThorSport Racing	Ford
Official entry list

== Practice ==
For practice, drivers were separated into two groups, A and B. Both sessions were 25 minutes long, and was held on Thursday, September 11, at 3:05 PM EST. Layne Riggs, driving for Front Row Motorsports, would set the fastest time between both groups, with a lap of 15.605, and a speed of 122.961 mph (197.887 km/h).

Pos.	#	Driver	Team	Make	Time	Speed
1	34	Layne Riggs (P)	Front Row Motorsports	Ford	15.605	122.961
2	91	Jack Wood	McAnally-Hilgemann Racing	Chevrolet	15.629	122.772
3	88	Matt Crafton	ThorSport Racing	Ford	15.641	122.678
Full practice results

== Qualifying ==
Qualifying was held on Thursday September 11, at 4:10 PM EST. Since Bristol Motor Speedway is a short track, the qualifying procedure used is a single-car, two-lap system with one round. Drivers will be on track by themselves and will have two laps to post a qualifying time, and whoever sets the fastest time will win the pole.

Jake Garcia, driving for ThorSport Racing, would score the pole for the race, with a lap of 15.249, and a speed of 125.831 mph (202.505 km/h).

Clay Greenfield was the only driver who failed to qualify.

=== Qualifying results ===
Pos.	#	Driver	Team	Make	Time	Speed
1	13	Jake Garcia (P)	ThorSport Racing	Ford	15.249	125.831
2	11	Corey Heim (P)	Tricon Garage	Toyota	15.291	125.486
3	18	Tyler Ankrum (P)	McAnally-Hilgemann Racing	Chevrolet	15.324	125.215
4	52	Kaden Honeycutt (P)	Halmar Friesen Racing	Toyota	15.336	125.117
5	7	Corey Day (i) (OP)	Spire Motorsports	Chevrolet	15.342	125.068
6	98	Ty Majeski (P)	ThorSport Racing	Ford	15.350	125.003
7	34	Layne Riggs (P)	Front Row Motorsports	Ford	15.353	124.979
8	38	Chandler Smith (P)	Front Row Motorsports	Ford	15.359	124.930
9	9	Grant Enfinger (P)	CR7 Motorsports	Chevrolet	15.378	124.776
10	71	Rajah Caruth (P)	Spire Motorsports	Chevrolet	15.380	124.759
11	19	Daniel Hemric (P)	McAnally-Hilgemann Racing	Chevrolet	15.393	124.654
12	26	Dawson Sutton (R)	Rackley W.A.R.	Chevrolet	15.412	124.500
13	45	Bayley Currey	Niece Motorsports	Chevrolet	15.457	124.138
14	17	Gio Ruggiero (R)	Tricon Garage	Toyota	15.479	123.961
15	1	Brent Crews	Tricon Garage	Toyota	15.481	123.945
16	44	Andrés Pérez de Lara (R)	Niece Motorsports	Chevrolet	15.485	123.913
17	15	Tanner Gray	Tricon Garage	Toyota	15.509	123.722
18	77	Corey LaJoie	Spire Motorsports	Chevrolet	15.547	123.419
19	99	Ben Rhodes	ThorSport Racing	Ford	15.550	123.395
20	88	Matt Crafton	ThorSport Racing	Ford	15.560	123.316
21	62	Cole Butcher	Halmar Friesen Racing	Toyota	15.564	123.285
22	91	Jack Wood	McAnally-Hilgemann Racing	Chevrolet	15.631	122.756
23	81	Connor Mosack (R)	McAnally-Hilgemann Racing	Chevrolet	15.634	122.733
24	42	Matt Mills	Niece Motorsports	Chevrolet	15.662	122.513
25	75	Parker Kligerman	Henderson Motorsports	Chevrolet	15.675	122.411
26	20	Stefan Parsons	Young's Motorsports	Chevrolet	15.691	122.287
27	41	Conner Jones	Niece Motorsports	Chevrolet	15.745	121.867
28	02	Treyten Lapcevich	Young's Motorsports	Chevrolet	15.837	121.159
29	33	Mason Maggio (i)	Reaume Brothers Racing	Ford	16.001	119.918
30	35	Greg Van Alst	Greg Van Alst Motorsports	Toyota	16.032	119.686
Qualified by owner's points
31	5	Toni Breidinger (R)	Tricon Garage	Toyota	16.064	119.447
32	22	Josh Reaume	Reaume Brothers Racing	Ford	16.238	118.167
33	76	Spencer Boyd	Freedom Racing Enterprises	Chevrolet	16.245	118.116
34	6	Norm Benning	Norm Benning Racing	Chevrolet	17.029	112.678
35	2	Clayton Green	Reaume Brothers Racing	Ford	17.219	111.435
36	74	Caleb Costner	Mike Harmon Racing	Toyota	18.192	105.475
Failed to qualify
37	95	Clay Greenfield	GK Racing	Chevrolet	16.981	112.997
Official qualifying results
Official starting lineup

== Race results ==
Stage 1 Laps: 65

Pos.	#	Driver	Team	Make	Pts
1	13	Jake Garcia (P)	ThorSport Racing	Ford	10
2	11	Corey Heim (P)	Tricon Garage	Toyota	9
3	52	Kaden Honeycutt (P)	Halmar Friesen Racing	Toyota	8
4	18	Tyler Ankrum (P)	McAnally-Hilgemann Racing	Chevrolet	7
5	98	Ty Majeski (P)	ThorSport Racing	Ford	6
6	71	Rajah Caruth (P)	Spire Motorsports	Chevrolet	5
7	7	Corey Day (i) (OP)	Spire Motorsports	Chevrolet	0
8	17	Gio Ruggiero (R)	Tricon Garage	Toyota	3
9	34	Layne Riggs (P)	Front Row Motorsports	Ford	2
10	45	Bayley Currey	Niece Motorsports	Chevrolet	1

Stage 2 Laps: 65

Pos.	#	Driver	Team	Make	Pts
1	11	Corey Heim (P)	Tricon Garage	Toyota	10
2	34	Layne Riggs (P)	Front Row Motorsports	Ford	9
3	98	Ty Majeski (P)	ThorSport Racing	Ford	8
4	52	Kaden Honeycutt (P)	Halmar Friesen Racing	Toyota	7
5	99	Ben Rhodes	ThorSport Racing	Ford	6
6	17	Gio Ruggiero (R)	Tricon Garage	Toyota	5
7	81	Connor Mosack (R)	McAnally-Hilgemann Racing	Chevrolet	4
8	19	Daniel Hemric (P)	McAnally-Hilgemann Racing	Chevrolet	3
9	7	Corey Day (i) (OP)	Spire Motorsports	Chevrolet	0
10	44	Andrés Pérez de Lara (R)	Niece Motorsports	Chevrolet	1

Stage 3 Laps: 120

Fin	St	#	Driver	Team	Make	Laps	Led	Status	Pts
1	7	34	Layne Riggs (P)	Front Row Motorsports	Ford	250	110	Running	51
2	19	99	Ben Rhodes	ThorSport Racing	Ford	250	0	Running	41
3	2	11	Corey Heim (P)	Tricon Garage	Toyota	250	122	Running	53
4	6	98	Ty Majeski (P)	ThorSport Racing	Ford	250	0	Running	47
5	11	19	Daniel Hemric (P)	McAnally-Hilgemann Racing	Chevrolet	250	0	Running	35
6	17	15	Tanner Gray	Tricon Garage	Toyota	250	0	Running	31
7	23	81	Connor Mosack (R)	McAnally-Hilgemann Racing	Chevrolet	250	0	Running	34
8	16	44	Andrés Pérez de Lara (R)	Niece Motorsports	Chevrolet	250	0	Running	30
9	18	77	Corey LaJoie	Spire Motorsports	Chevrolet	250	0	Running	28
10	20	88	Matt Crafton	ThorSport Racing	Ford	250	0	Running	27
11	5	7	Corey Day (i) (OP)	Spire Motorsports	Chevrolet	250	0	Running	0
12	4	52	Kaden Honeycutt (P)	Halmar Friesen Racing	Toyota	250	0	Running	40
13	14	17	Gio Ruggiero (R)	Tricon Garage	Toyota	250	0	Running	32
14	25	75	Parker Kligerman	Henderson Motorsports	Chevrolet	249	0	Running	23
15	10	71	Rajah Caruth (P)	Spire Motorsports	Chevrolet	249	0	Running	27
16	24	42	Matt Mills	Niece Motorsports	Chevrolet	249	0	Running	21
17	12	26	Dawson Sutton (R)	Rackley W.A.R.	Chevrolet	249	0	Running	20
18	27	41	Conner Jones	Niece Motorsports	Chevrolet	249	0	Running	19
19	13	45	Bayley Currey	Niece Motorsports	Chevrolet	249	0	Running	19
20	3	18	Tyler Ankrum (P)	McAnally-Hilgemann Racing	Chevrolet	249	0	Running	24
21	9	9	Grant Enfinger (P)	CR7 Motorsports	Chevrolet	249	0	Running	16
22	22	91	Jack Wood	McAnally-Hilgemann Racing	Chevrolet	249	0	Running	15
23	21	62	Cole Butcher	Halmar Friesen Racing	Toyota	248	4	Running	14
24	15	1	Brent Crews	Tricon Garage	Toyota	247	0	Running	13
25	26	20	Stefan Parsons	Young's Motorsports	Chevrolet	245	0	Running	12
26	31	5	Toni Breidinger (R)	Tricon Garage	Toyota	243	0	Running	11
27	33	76	Spencer Boyd	Freedom Racing Enterprises	Chevrolet	242	0	Running	10
28	32	22	Josh Reaume	Reaume Brothers Racing	Ford	241	0	Running	9
29	30	35	Greg Van Alst	Greg Van Alst Motorsports	Toyota	239	0	Running	8
30	8	38	Chandler Smith (P)	Front Row Motorsports	Ford	236	0	Running	7
31	29	33	Mason Maggio (i)	Reaume Brothers Racing	Ford	232	0	Running	0
32	28	02	Treyten Lapcevich	Young's Motorsports	Chevrolet	227	0	Power Steering	5
33	1	13	Jake Garcia (P)	ThorSport Racing	Ford	219	14	Running	15
34	34	6	Norm Benning	Norm Benning Racing	Chevrolet	21	0	Too Slow	3
35	36	74	Caleb Costner	Mike Harmon Racing	Toyota	19	0	Too Slow	2
36	35	2	Clayton Green	Reaume Brothers Racing	Ford	9	0	Transmission	1
Official race results

== Standings after the race ==
Drivers' Championship standings

	Pos	Driver	Points
	1	Corey Heim	2,177
	2	Layne Riggs	2,116 (–61)
	3	Daniel Hemric	2,095 (–82)
2	4	Ty Majeski	2,090 (–87)
1	5	Grant Enfinger	2,073 (–104)
1	6	Tyler Ankrum	2,073 (–104)
3	7	Kaden Honeycutt	2,062 (–115)
1	8	Rajah Caruth	2,058 (–119)
1	9	Jake Garcia	2,044 (–133)
1	10	Chandler Smith	2,034 (–143)
Official driver's standings

Manufacturers' Championship standings

Pos	Manufacturer	Points
1	Toyota	725
2	Chevrolet	716 (–9)
3	Ford	698 (–27)

- Note: Only the first 10 positions are included for the driver standings.

Previous race: 2025 Sober or Slammer 200	NASCAR Craftsman Truck Series; 2025 season	Next race: 2025 Team EJP 175
