= 2025 ARCA Menards Series West 150 =

3rd race of the 2025 ARCA Menards Series West

2025 ARCA Menards Series West 150 presented by the West Coast Stock Car Motorsports Hall of Fame
Race details
- Race 3 of 12 of the 2025 ARCA Menards Series West
- Date: April 5, 2025
- Official name: 1st Annual ARCA Menards Series West 150 presented by the West Coast Stock Car Motorsports Hall of Fame
- Location: Tucson Speedway in Tucson, Arizona
- Course: Permanent racing facility
- Course length: 0.50 miles (0.375 km)
- Distance: 150 laps, 56.25 mi (90.5 km)
- Scheduled distance: 150 laps, 56.25 mi (90.5 km)
- Average speed: 71.758 mph (115.483 km/h)

Pole position
Driver	Jake Bollman	Bill McAnally Racing
- Time: 15.977

Most laps led
Driver	Todd Souza	Central Coast Racing
- Laps: 53

Winner
No. 13	Tanner Reif	Central Coast Racing

Television in the United States
- Network: FloRacing
- Announcers: Charles Krall

Radio in the United States
- Radio: ARCA Racing Network

The 2025 ARCA Menards Series West 150 presented by the West Coast Stock Car Motorsports Hall of Fame was the 3rd stock car race of the 2025 ARCA Menards Series West season, and the 1st running of the event. The race was held on Saturday, April 5, 2025, at Tucson Speedway in Tucson, Arizona, a 0.375 mile (0.604 km) permanent asphalt quad-oval shaped short track. The race took the scheduled 150 laps to complete. In an action-packed race with a thrilling finish, Tanner Reif, driving for Central Coast Racing, would hold off Jake Bollman and Eric Johnson Jr. in a close finish to earn his third career ARCA Menards Series West win, and his first of the season. Reif's teammate Todd Souza took the lead early in the race due to tire-saving strategies, and ended up leading a race-high 53 laps before falling back on the final restart and finishing 8th.

== Report ==
=== Background ===
Tucson Speedway is a 0.375 mi (0.604 km) paved oval racetrack located at the Pima County Fairgrounds, off Interstate 10 just south of Tucson, Arizona. It is one of only three paved ovals in the state of Arizona (the others are Phoenix Raceway and Havasu 95 Speedway).

The track was built in 1967 as the Corona Speedway. The original track layout was a dirt/clay half mile oval, with an infield quarter mile track that connected via the frontstraightaway. Bob Frakes would take over as the operator until passing the torch to Calvin Renard in 1983. The track would close in the winter of 1983 before B.O.P. Incorporated would take the lease and operate the track until 1986.

In 1987, dirt racer Dan Manes and his wife Linda would take over the track, reconfiguring it into a 0.375 mi (0.604 km) oval and renaming the facility "Raven Raceway".

In 1990, a subsidiary of International Speedway Corporation, Great Western Sports, would purchase the lease and take over from the Manes family, also renaming the track for a second time as "Tucson Raceway Park".

==== Entry list ====
- (R) denotes rookie driver.

#	Driver	Team	Make	Sponsor
1	Robbie Kennealy (R)	Jan's Towing Racing	Ford	Jan's Towing
3	Todd Souza	Central Coast Racing	Toyota	Central Coast Cabinets
05	David Smith	Shockwave Motorsports	Toyota	Shockwave Marine Suspension Seating
5	Eric Johnson Jr.	Jerry Pitts Racing	Toyota	Sherwin-Williams
6	Caleb Shrader	Jerry Pitts Racing	Toyota	Consonus Healthcare
13	Tanner Reif	Central Coast Racing	Toyota	Central Coast Cabinets
19	Jake Bollman (R)	Bill McAnally Racing	Chevrolet	NAPA Auto Care
31	Tim Goulet	Rise Motorsports	Toyota	Tri-City Raceway / Max Buchanan Foundation
50	Trevor Huddleston	High Point Racing	Ford	High Point Racing / Racecar Factory
51	Blake Lothian (R)	Strike Mamba Racing	Chevrolet	Texas Lawbook
71	Kyle Keller	Jan's Towing Racing	Ford	Jan's Towing
72	Cody Dennison	Strike Mamba Racing	Chevrolet	Timcast
77	Mariah Boudrieau	Performance P–1 Motorsports	Toyota	REX MD / All Phase Construction / Wallace Sign
Official entry list

== Practice ==
The first and only practice session was held on Saturday, April 5, at 2:00 PM PST, and lasted for 1 hour. Jake Bollman, driving for Bill McAnally Racing, would set the fastest time in the session, with a lap of 15.979, and a speed of 84.486 mph (135.967 km/h).

Pos.	#	Driver	Team	Make	Time	Speed
1	19	Jake Bollman (R)	Bill McAnally Racing	Chevrolet	15.979	84.486
2	13	Tanner Reif	Central Coast Racing	Toyota	16.151	83.586
3	71	Kyle Keller	Jan's Towing Racing	Ford	16.161	83.534
Full practice results

== Qualifying ==
Qualifying was held on Saturday, April 5, at 3:30 PM PST. The qualifying procedure used is a single-car, two-lap system with one round. Drivers will be on track by themselves and will have two laps to post a qualifying time, and whoever sets the fastest time will win the pole.

Jake Bollman, driving for Bill McAnally Racing, would score the pole for the race, with a lap of 15.977, and a speed of 84.496 mph (135.983 km/h).

=== Qualifying results ===
Pos.	#	Driver	Team	Make	Time	Speed
1	19	Jake Bollman (R)	Bill McAnally Racing	Chevrolet	15.977	84.496
2	50	Trevor Huddleston	High Point Racing	Ford	16.084	83.934
3	13	Tanner Reif	Central Coast Racing	Toyota	16.101	83.846
4	1	Robbie Kennealy (R)	Jan's Towing Racing	Ford	16.130	83.695
5	71	Kyle Keller	Jan's Towing Racing	Ford	16.186	83.405
6	3	Todd Souza	Central Coast Racing	Toyota	16.280	82.924
7	5	Eric Johnson Jr.	Jerry Pitts Racing	Toyota	16.357	82.533
8	51	Blake Lothian (R)	Strike Mamba Racing	Chevrolet	16.392	82.357
9	6	Caleb Shrader	Jerry Pitts Racing	Toyota	16.421	82.212
10	72	Cody Dennison	Strike Mamba Racing	Chevrolet	16.485	81.893
11	05	David Smith	Shockwave Motorsports	Toyota	16.864	80.052
12	77	Mariah Boudrieau	Performance P–1 Motorsports	Toyota	17.509	77.103
13	31	Tim Goulet	Rise Motorsports	Toyota	18.088	74.635
Official qualifying results

== Race results ==
Fin	St	#	Driver	Team	Make	Laps	Led	Status	Pts
1	3	13	Tanner Reif	Central Coast Racing	Toyota	150	2	Running	47
2	7	5	Eric Johnson Jr.	Jerry Pitts Racing	Toyota	150	31	Running	43
3	1	19	Jake Bollman (R)	Bill McAnally Racing	Chevrolet	150	14	Running	43
4	5	71	Kyle Keller	Jan's Towing Racing	Ford	150	8	Running	41
5	2	50	Trevor Huddleston	High Point Racing	Ford	150	42	Running	40
6	9	6	Caleb Shrader	Jerry Pitts Racing	Toyota	150	0	Running	38
7	4	1	Robbie Kennealy (R)	Jan's Towing Racing	Ford	150	0	Running	37
8	6	3	Todd Souza	Central Coast Racing	Toyota	148	53	Running	38
9	8	51	Blake Lothian (R)	Strike Mamba Racing	Chevrolet	148	0	Running	35
10	10	72	Cody Dennison	Strike Mamba Racing	Chevrolet	148	0	Running	34
11	12	77	Mariah Boudrieau	Performance P–1 Motorsports	Toyota	146	0	Running	33
12	11	05	David Smith	Shockwave Motorsports	Toyota	142	0	Running	32
13	13	31	Tim Goulet	Rise Motorsports	Toyota	104	0	Handling	31
Official race results

== Standings after the race ==
Drivers' Championship standings

	Pos	Driver	Points
	1	Trevor Huddleston	121
1	2	Tanner Reif	120 (-1)
1	3	Eric Johnson Jr.	115 (–6)
1	4	Kyle Keller	112 (–9)
3	5	Robbie Kennealy	112 (–9)
	6	Cody Dennison	98 (–23)
1	7	Blake Lothian	95 (–26)
1	8	David Smith	81 (–40)
20	9	Jake Bollman	63 (–58)
3	10	Adrián Ferrer	63 (–58)

- Note: Only the first 10 positions are included for the driver standings.

Previous race: 2025 General Tire 150 (Phoenix)	ARCA Menards Series West; 2025 season	Next race: 2025 Colorado 150
