= Kyle Keller (racing driver) =

American racing driver (born 2005)

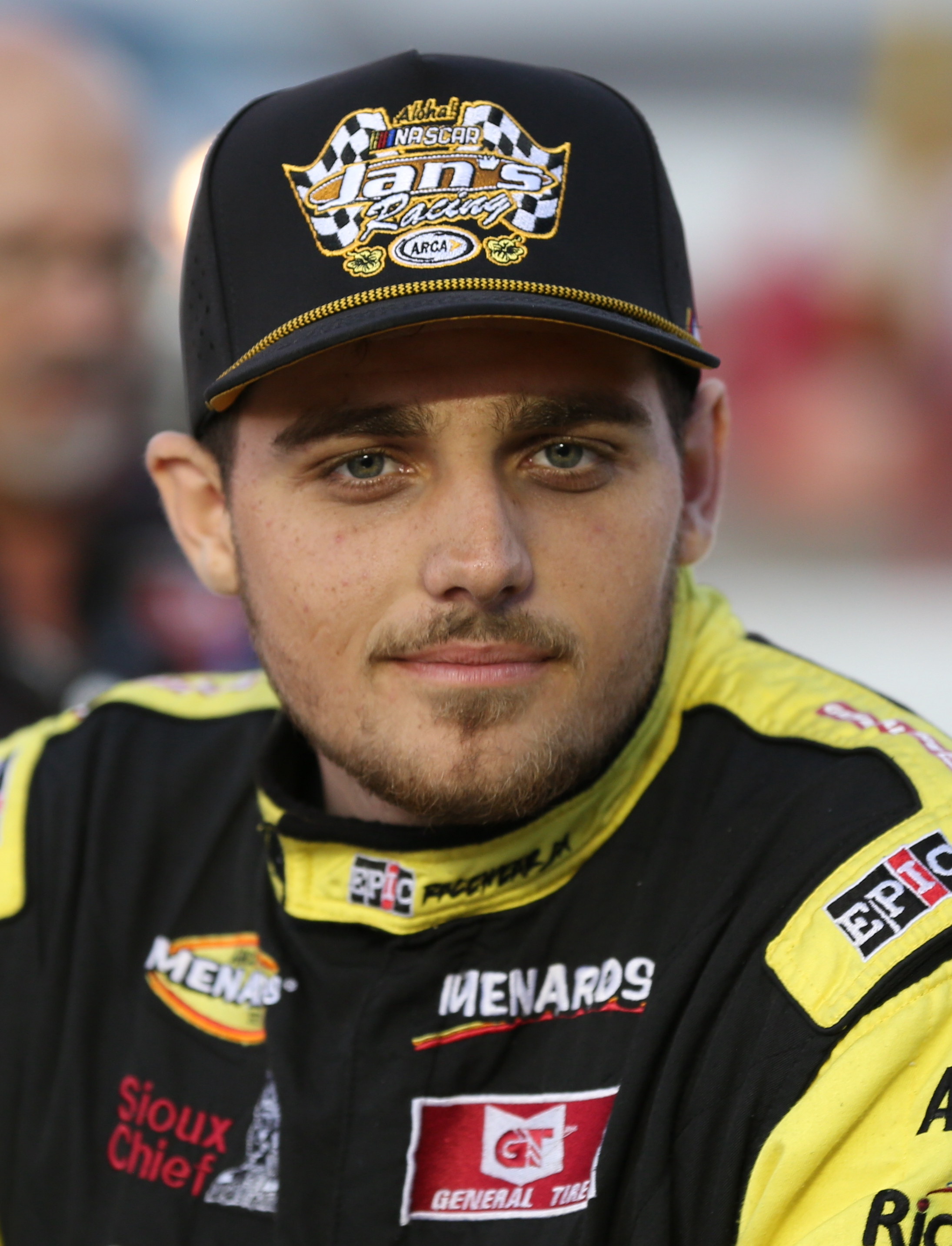
- Keller at Madera Speedway in 2025
- Born: January 25, 2005 (age 21); Las Vegas, Nevada, U.S.

ARCA Menards Series career
- 4 races run over 4 years
- Best finish: 72nd (2023)
- First race: 2022 General Tire 150 (Phoenix)
- Last race: 2025 General Tire 150 (Phoenix)
Wins	Top tens	Poles
0	1	0

ARCA Menards Series West career
- 49 races run over 6 years
- Best finish: 2nd (2025)
- First race: 2020 General Tire 150 (Las Vegas Bullring)
- Last race: 2026 Kyle Busch Classic (LVMS Bullring)
- First win: 2025 NAPA Auto Care 150 (Tri-City)
Wins	Top tens	Poles
1	32	1
- Statistics up to date as of October 2, 2026.

Kyle Keller (born January 25, 2005) is an American professional stock car racing driver. He last competed part-time in the ARCA Menards Series West and part-time in the ARCA Menards Series, driving the No. 4 Chevrolet for Nascimento Motorsports.

== Racing career ==
=== Lucas Oil Modified Series ===
Keller would drive a full-time season in the Lucas Oil Modified Series in 2019, for his family owned team. Keller had six top-tens, which placed him fourth in the overall standings. He would also compete in the SRL 5th Annual Winter Showdown at Kern County Raceway Park that year, and would finish in thirteenth.

=== ARCA Menards Series West ===
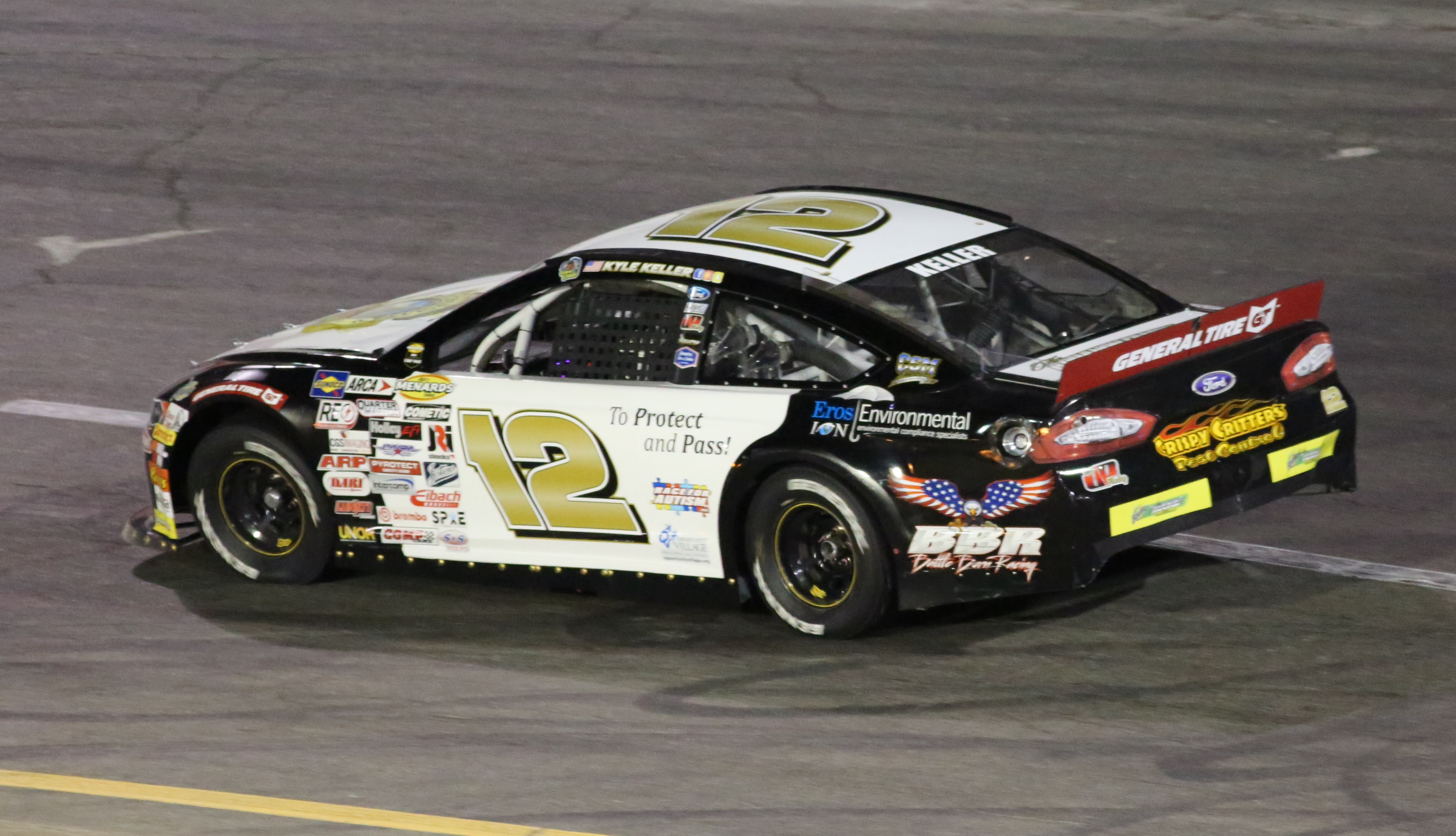
Keller's No. 12 car at All American Speedway in 2022

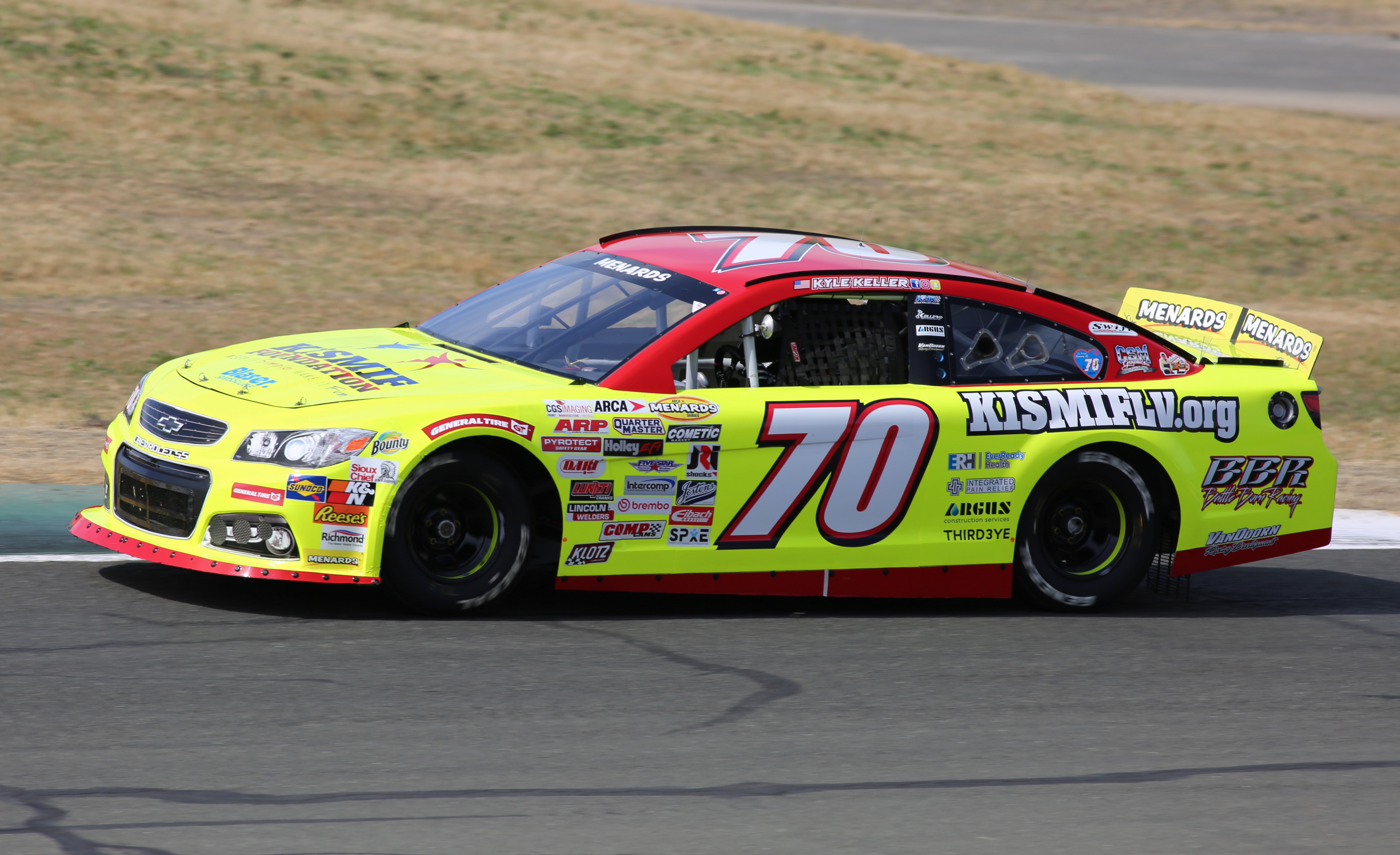
Keller's No. 70 ARCA car at Sonoma in 2023

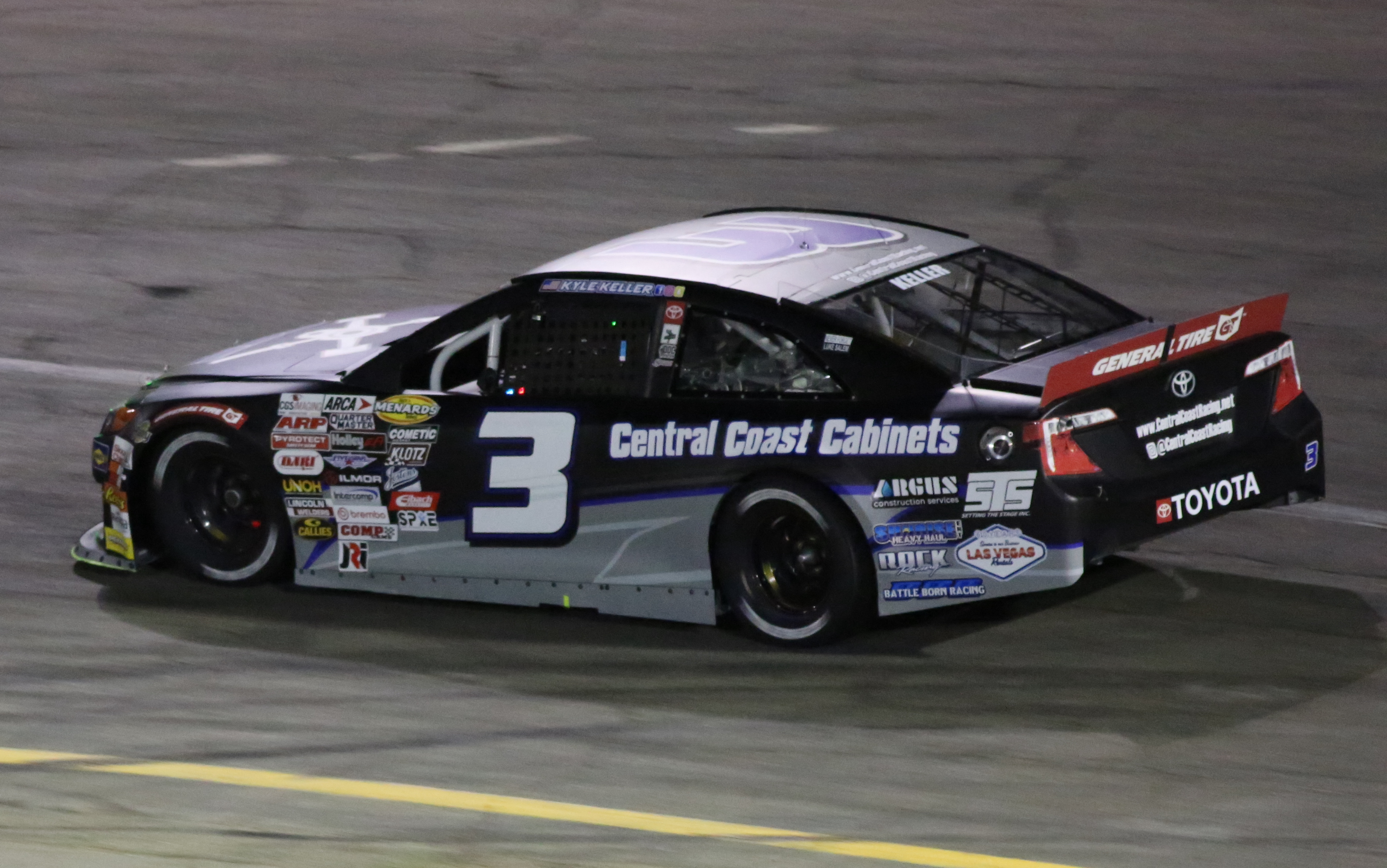
Keller's No. 3 car at All American Speedway in 2024

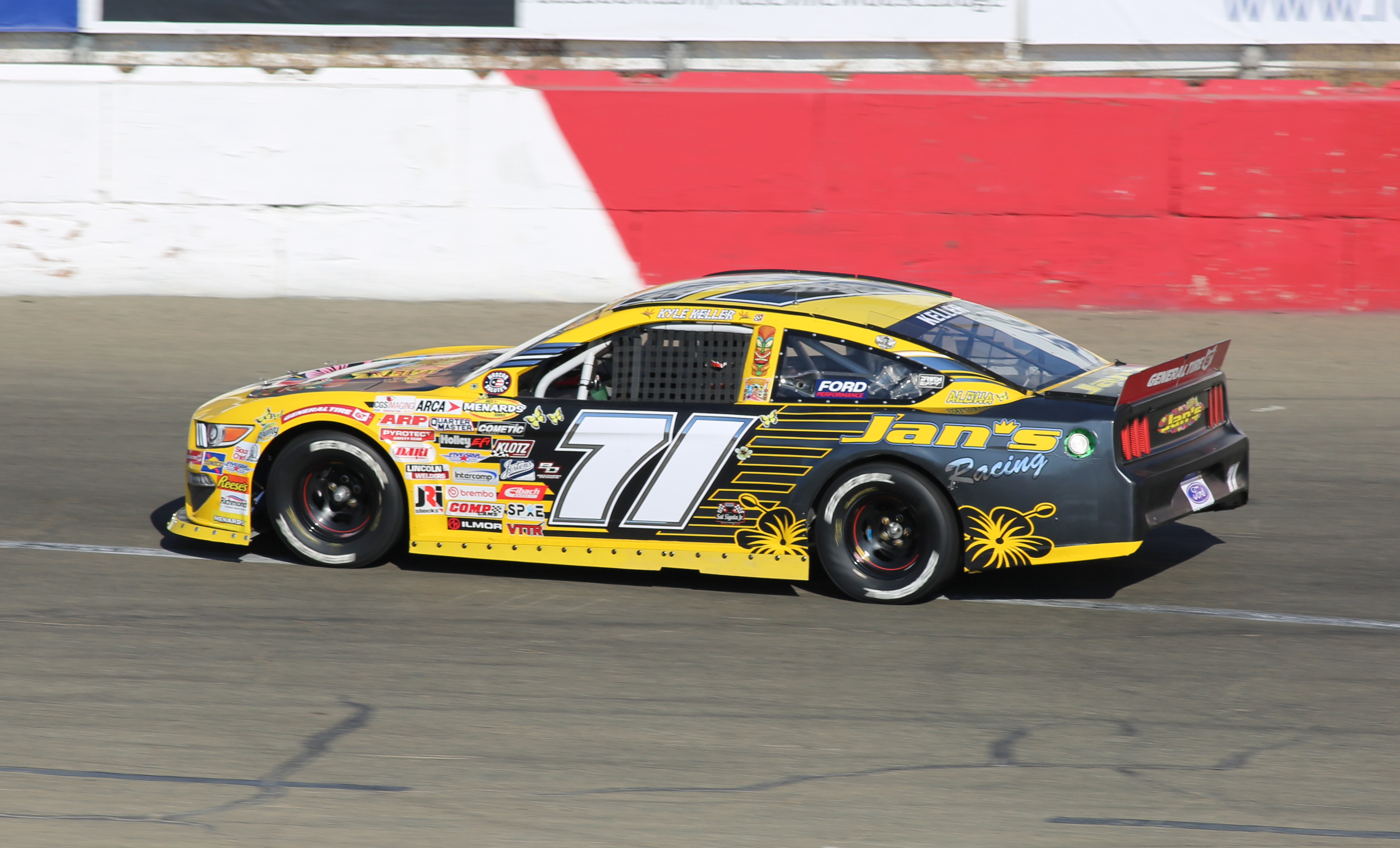
Keller's No. 71 car at All American Speedway in 2025

Keller would sign with Jerry Pitts Racing for two races in the 2020 ARCA Menards Series West. He would get one top-five and two top tens in his only two starts, finishing sixteenth in the final standings. He made one start for Jerry Pitts Racing in 2021, finishing fifth at his home track, the Las Vegas Motor Speedway Bullring. On January 3, 2022, Keller announced that he will be running the full 2022 ARCA Menards Series West schedule for his own team, Kyle Keller Racing. After finishing 32nd at Phoenix and withdrawing from Irwindale, he scaled down to a partial schedule. He ran the No. 12 for most of the season in a technical alliance with JPR, earning four top tens and three top fives to finish eleventh in point standings.

In 2023, Keller returned to JPR for a full season. He earned six top tens and one top five throughout the season, finishing eighth in point standings.

On September 2, 2023, it was announced that Keller and fellow driver Robbie Kennealy would drive for the newly formed Kennealy Keller Motorsports driver development program in the 2024 season. The team is owned by Robbie's mother, Francesca, and his fraternal twin sister, Harley.

On October 5, 2024, Keller instead drove the No. 3 Central Coast Racing Toyota at All American Speedway, and in the final two events, he drove for the No. 9 Jan's Towing Racing Ford. Later that year, it was revealed that Keller would compete full-time for Jan's Towing Racing's No. 71, alongside Robbie Kennealy in the No. 9. On August 10, 2025, Keller scored his first career win at Tri-County Raceway after passing Jake Bollman on a late restart.

=== NASCAR Xfinity Series ===
On June 27, 2024, it was announced that Keller would attempt to make his debut in the NASCAR Xfinity Series at Watkins Glen International, driving the No. 13 for MBM Motorsports. However, he would fail to qualify.

=== SRL Southwest Tour ===
Keller made two starts in the SRL Southwest Tour in 2021, driving in the first and last race of the season. He finished eighteenth at the Irwindale Event Center, and fourth at the Kern County Raceway Park. He would get his first ever late model win at the Madera Speedway Short Track Shootout, after starting from the pole and leading the most laps.

=== NASCAR Advance Auto Parts Weekly Series ===
Keller ran two races in the NASCAR Advance Auto Parts Weekly Series in 2021, driving at the Las Vegas Motor Speedway Bullring. He would get one top-five and two top-tens, finishing eighteenth in the regular standings.

== Personal life ==
Keller and his father John run a driver development program called Kyle Keller Driver Development. Some drivers included in the program are Robbie Kennealy and Monty Tipton, who made starts in the ARCA Menards Series West in 2023.

Despite sharing a surname, he is not related to Jason Keller.

== Motorsports career results ==
=== NASCAR ===
(key) (Bold – Pole position awarded by qualifying time. Italics – Pole position earned by points standings or practice time. * – Most laps led.)

==== Xfinity Series ====
NASCAR Xfinity Series results
Year	Team	No.	Make	1	2	3	4	5	6	7	8	9	10	11	12	13	14	15	16	17	18	19	20	21	22	23	24	25	26	27	28	29	30	31	32	33	NXSC	Pts	Ref
2024	MBM Motorsports	13	Ford	DAY	ATL	LVS	PHO	COA	RCH	MAR	TEX	TAL	DOV	DAR	CLT	PIR	SON	IOW	NHA	NSH	CSC	POC	IND	MCH	DAY	DAR	ATL	GLN; DNQ	BRI	KAN	TAL	ROV	LVS	HOM	MAR	PHO	N/A	0	

=== ARCA Menards Series ===
(key) (Bold – Pole position awarded by qualifying time. Italics – Pole position earned by points standings or practice time. * – Most laps led.)

ARCA Menards Series results
Year	Team	No.	Make	1	2	3	4	5	6	7	8	9	10	11	12	13	14	15	16	17	18	19	20	AMSC	Pts	Ref
2022	Kyle Keller Racing	70	Chevy	DAY	PHO; 32	TAL	KAN	CLT	IOW	BLN	ELK	MOH	POC	IRP	MCH	GLN	ISF	MLW	DSF	KAN	BRI	SLM	TOL	121st	12	
2023	Jerry Pitts Racing	70	Toyota	DAY	PHO; 5	TAL	KAN	CLT	BLN	ELK	MOH	IOW	POC	MCH	IRP	GLN	ISF	MLW	DSF	KAN	BRI	SLM	TOL	72nd	39	
2024	Kennealy Keller Motorsports	70	Ford	DAY	PHO; 18	TAL	DOV	KAN	CLT	IOW	MOH	BLN	IRP	SLM	ELK	MCH	ISF	MLW	DSF	GLN	BRI	KAN	TOL	94th	26	
2025	Jan's Towing Racing with Kennealy Keller Motorsports	71	Ford	DAY	PHO; 15	TAL	KAN	CLT	MCH	BLN	ELK	LRP	DOV	IRP	IOW	GLN	ISF	MAD	DSF	BRI	SLM	KAN	TOL	112th	29	

==== ARCA Menards Series West ====
ARCA Menards Series West results
Year	Team	No.	Make	1	2	3	4	5	6	7	8	9	10	11	12	13	AMSWC	Pts	Ref
2020	JP Racing	7	Ford	LVS	MMP	MMP	IRW	EVG	DCS	CNS	LVS; 4	AAS					28th	78	
2020	JP Racing	7	Toyota										KCR; 6	PHO			28th	78	
2021	Jerry Pitts Racing	5	Ford	PHO	SON	IRW	CNS	IRW	PIR	LVS; 5	AAS	PHO					43rd	39	
2022	Kyle Keller Racing	70	Chevy	PHO; 32													11th	267	
2022	Kyle Keller Racing	70	Ford											PHO; 25			11th	267	
2022	Kyle Keller Racing	12	Chevy		IRW; Wth	KCR; 14	PIR	SON									11th	267	
2022	Kyle Keller Racing	12	Ford						IRW; 4	EVG; 7	PIR	AAS; 5	LVS; 4				11th	267	
2023	Jerry Pitts Racing	70	Toyota	PHO; 5	IRW; 6	KCR; 14											8th	548	
2023	Jerry Pitts Racing	70	Chevy				PIR; 20	SON; 13									8th	548	
2023	Jerry Pitts Racing	70	Ford						IRW; 15	SHA; 6	EVG; 7	AAS; 17	LVS; 6	MAD; 7	PHO; 14		8th	548	
2024	Kennealy Keller Motorsports	70	Ford	PHO; 18													5th	562	
2024	Kennealy Keller Motorsports	12	Ford		KER; 7			IRW; 8	IRW; 11	SHA; 5	TRI; 5	MAD; 5					5th	562	
2024	Kennealy Keller Motorsports	12	Chevy			PIR; 9	SON; 9										5th	562	
2024	Central Coast Racing	3	Toyota										AAS; 10				5th	562	
2024	Jan's Towing Racing	9	Ford											KER; 19	PHO; 10		5th	562	
2025	Jan's Towing Racing with Kennealy Keller Motorsports	71	Ford	KER; 2	PHO; 15	TUC; 4	CNS; 2	**KER**; 2	SON; 8	TRI; 1	PIR; 6	AAS; 6	MAD; 2	LVS; 13	PHO; 15		2nd	610	
2026	Nascimento Motorsports	4	Chevy	KER	PHO	TUC	SHA	CNS; 5	TRI	SON				LVS; 20	PHO	KER	27th	86	
2026	Nascimento Motorsports	4	Toyota								PIR; 21	AAS	MAD				27th	86	
