= 2024 Desert Diamond Casino West Valley 100 =

12th race of the 2024 ARCA Menards Series West

Race details
- Race 12 of 12 of the 2024 ARCA Menards Series West
- Date: November 8, 2024
- Official name: 52nd Annual Desert Diamond Casino West Valley 100
- Location: Phoenix Raceway in Avondale, Arizona
- Course: Permanent racing facility
- Course length: 1 miles (1.6 km)
- Distance: 100 laps, 100 mi (160 km)
- Scheduled distance: 100 laps, 100 mi (160 km)
- Average speed: 98.307 mph (158.210 km/h)

Pole position
Driver	William Sawalich	Joe Gibbs Racing
- Time: 26.780

Most laps led
Driver	Connor Zilisch	Pinnacle Racing Group
- Laps: 99

Winner
No. 28	Connor Zilisch	Pinnacle Racing Group

Television in the United States
- Network: FloRacing
- Announcers: Charlie Krall and Phil Parsons

Radio in the United States
- Radio: MRN

The 2024 Desert Diamond Casino West Valley 100 was the 12th and final stock car race of the 2024 ARCA Menards Series West season, and the 52nd iteration of the event. The race was held on Friday, November 8, 2024, at Phoenix Raceway in Avondale, Arizona, a 1-mile (1.6 km) permanent tri-oval shaped racetrack. The race took the scheduled 100 laps to complete. Connor Zilisch, driving for Pinnacle Racing Group, would put on a dominant performance, leading the most laps and earning his first career ARCA Menards Series West win in his first career West Series start. To fill out the podium, William Sawalich, driving for Joe Gibbs Racing, and Sean Hingorani, driving for Venturini Motorsports, would finish 2nd and 3rd, respectively.

Despite finishing in third, Sean Hingorani would claim the 2024 ARCA Menards Series West championship. This was Hingorani's second championship, winning it the year before and the second championship for Venturini Motorsports in the West Series.

== Report ==
=== Background ===
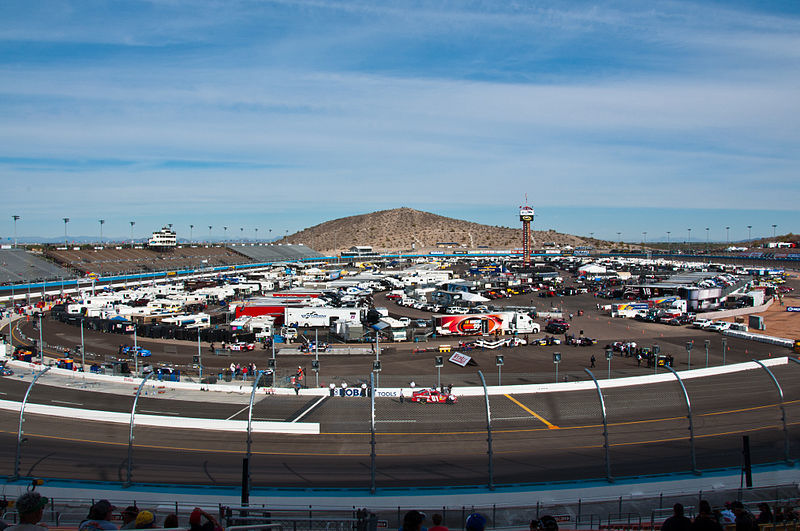
Phoenix Raceway, the track where the race was held.

Phoenix Raceway – also known as PIR – is a one-mile, low-banked tri-oval race track located in Avondale, Arizona. It is named after the nearby metropolitan area of Phoenix. The motorsport track opened in 1964 and currently hosts two NASCAR race weekends annually. PIR has also hosted the IndyCar Series, CART, USAC and the Rolex Sports Car Series. The raceway is currently owned and operated by International Speedway Corporation.

The raceway was originally constructed with a 2.5 mi (4.0 km) road course that ran both inside and outside of the main tri-oval. In 1991 the track was reconfigured with the current 1.51 mi (2.43 km) interior layout. PIR has an estimated grandstand seating capacity of around 67,000. Lights were installed around the track in 2004 following the addition of a second annual NASCAR race weekend.

Phoenix Raceway is home to two annual NASCAR race weekends, one of 13 facilities on the NASCAR schedule to host more than one race weekend a year. The track is both the first and last stop in the western United States, as well as the fourth and the last track on the schedule.

=== Entry list ===
- (R) denotes rookie driver.

#	Driver	Team	Make	Sponsor
0	Tony Huffman	Fierce Creature Racing	Chevrolet	First Impression Press
2	Sebastian Arias	Rev Racing	Chevrolet	Brady Plus
3	Todd Souza	Central Coast Racing	Toyota	Central Coast Cabinets
4	Eric Nascimento	Nascimento Motorsports	Chevrolet	Impact Transportation / RJs Paintshop
05	Joey Iest (Note: After David Smith jumped out of his car early in the race in his No. 05 car, Smith would give up his ride and allow Iest to pilot the No. 05 car during the race.)	Shockwave Motorsports	Toyota	Shockwave Marine Suspension Seating
6	Lavar Scott	Rev Racing	Chevrolet	Max Siegel Inc.
7	Takuma Koga	Jerry Pitts Racing	Toyota	Takt Diesien / CKB
9	Kyle Keller	Jan's Towing Racing	Ford	Jan's Towing
13	Tyler Reif	Central Coast Racing	Toyota	Central Coast Cabinets
15	Sean Hingorani	Venturini Motorsports	Toyota	Fidelity Capital
16	Jack Wood	Bill McAnally Racing	Chevrolet	NAPA Auto Care
18	William Sawalich	Joe Gibbs Racing	Toyota	Starkey / SoundGear
19	Eric Johnson Jr. (R)	Bill McAnally Racing	Chevrolet	Pacific Office Automation
20	Gio Ruggiero	Venturini Motorsports	Toyota	JBL
21	Alex Malycke	Nascimento Motorsports	Toyota	Impact Transportation / Phillips Bros Fab
22	Brent Crews	Venturini Motorsports	Toyota	Mobil 1
23	Kaden Honeycutt	Sigma Performance Services	Toyota	SPS / GMS Fabrication
25	Marco Andretti	Venturini Motorsports	Toyota	Rich Mar Florist
27	Bobby Hillis Jr.	Fierce Creature Racing	Chevrolet	Camping World / First Impression Press
28	Connor Zilisch	Pinnacle Racing Group	Chevrolet	Pristine Auction
50	Trevor Huddleston	High Point Racing	Ford	High Point Racing / Racecar Factory
55	Jake Finch	Venturini Motorsports	Toyota	Phoenix Construction
71	Rip Michels	Jan's Towing Racing	Ford	Jan's Towing
72	Jonathan Reaume	Reaume Brothers Racing	Ford	Mountain Top Media-RBR Engineering
76	Kole Raz	AM Racing	Ford	Cyclum Renewables Truck Stops
Official entry list

== Practice ==
The first and only practice session was held on Thursday, November 7, at 6:00 PM MST, and would last for 60 minutes. Connor Zilisch, driving for Pinnacle Racing Group, would set the fastest time in the session, with a lap of 27.239, and a speed of 132.163 mph (212.696 km/h).

Pos.	#	Driver	Team	Make	Time	Speed
1	28	Connor Zilisch	Pinnacle Racing Group	Chevrolet	27.239	132.163
2	18	William Sawalich	Joe Gibbs Racing	Toyota	27.327	131.738
3	16	Jack Wood	Bill McAnally Racing	Chevrolet	27.590	130.482
Full practice results

== Qualifying ==
Qualifying was held on Thursday, November 7, at 7:10 PM MST. The qualifying system used is a single-car, single-lap system with only one round. Whoever sets the fastest time in that round will win the pole.

William Sawalich, driving for Joe Gibbs Racing, would score the pole for the race, with a lap of 26.780, and a speed of 134.428 mph (216.341 km/h).

Pos.	#	Driver	Team	Make	Time	Speed
1	18	William Sawalich	Joe Gibbs Racing	Toyota	26.780	134.428
2	28	Connor Zilisch	Pinnacle Racing Group	Chevrolet	27.032	134.176
3	16	Jack Wood	Bill McAnally Racing	Chevrolet	27.121	134.087
4	13	Tyler Reif	Central Coast Racing	Toyota	27.219	133.989
5	15	Sean Hingorani	Venturini Motorsports	Toyota	27.249	133.959
6	20	Gio Ruggiero	Venturini Motorsports	Toyota	27.293	133.915
7	22	Brent Crews	Venturini Motorsports	Toyota	27.422	133.786
8	23	Kaden Honeycutt	Sigma Performance Services	Toyota	27.430	133.778
9	6	Lavar Scott	Rev Racing	Chevrolet	27.448	133.76
10	76	Kole Raz	AM Racing	Ford	27.456	133.752
11	19	Eric Johnson Jr. (R)	Bill McAnally Racing	Chevrolet	27.465	133.743
12	55	Jake Finch	Venturini Motorsports	Toyota	27.478	133.73
13	9	Kyle Keller	Jan's Towing Racing	Ford	27.690	133.518
14	25	Marco Andretti	Venturini Motorsports	Toyota	27.794	133.414
15	2	Sebastian Arias	Rev Racing	Chevrolet	27.920	133.288
16	4	Eric Nascimento	Nascimento Motorsports	Chevrolet	27.961	133.247
17	3	Todd Souza	Central Coast Racing	Toyota	28.290	132.918
18	7	Takuma Koga	Jerry Pitts Racing	Toyota	28.293	132.915
19	50	Trevor Huddleston	High Point Racing	Ford	28.368	132.84
20	05	David Smith	Shockwave Motorsports	Toyota	30.469	130.739
21	21	Alex Malycke	Nascimento Motorsports	Toyota	31.401	129.807
22	71	Rip Michels	Jan's Towing Racing	Ford	0.00	0.000
23	27	Bobby Hillis Jr.	Fierce Creature Racing	Chevrolet	0.00	0.000
24	0	Tony Huffman	Fierce Creature Racing	Chevrolet	0.00	0.000
Official qualifying results

== Race results ==
Fin	St	#	Driver	Team	Make	Laps	Led	Status	Pts
1	2	28	Connor Zilisch	Pinnacle Racing Group	Chevrolet	100	99	Running	48
2	1	18	William Sawalich	Joe Gibbs Racing	Toyota	100	1	Running	44
3	5	15	Sean Hingorani	Venturini Motorsports	Toyota	100	0	Running	91
4	6	20	Gio Ruggiero	Venturini Motorsports	Toyota	100	0	Running	40
5	7	22	Brent Crews	Venturini Motorsports	Toyota	100	0	Running	39
6	8	23	Kaden Honeycutt	Sigma Performance Services	Toyota	100	0	Running	38
7	12	55	Jake Finch	Venturini Motorsports	Toyota	100	0	Running	37
8	4	13	Tyler Reif	Central Coast Racing	Toyota	100	0	Running	86
9	10	76	Kole Raz	AM Racing	Ford	100	0	Running	85
10	13	9	Kyle Keller	Jan's Towing Racing	Ford	100	0	Running	84
11	3	16	Jack Wood	Bill McAnally Racing	Chevrolet	100	0	Running	83
12	9	6	Lavar Scott	Rev Racing	Chevrolet	100	0	Running	32
13	19	50	Trevor Huddleston	High Point Racing	Ford	98	0	Running	81
14	17	3	Todd Souza	Central Coast Racing	Toyota	98	0	Running	80
15	11	19	Eric Johnson Jr. (R)	Bill McAnally Racing	Chevrolet	98	0	Running	79
16	15	2	Sebastian Arias	Rev Racing	Chevrolet	98	0	Running	28
17	14	25	Marco Andretti	Venturini Motorsports	Toyota	98	0	Running	27
18	20	05	Joey Iest	Shockwave Motorsports	Toyota	97	0	Running	76
19	18	7	Takuma Koga	Jerry Pitts Racing	Toyota	97	0	Running	75
20	22	71	Rip Michels	Jan's Towing Racing	Ford	96	0	Running	74
21	16	4	Eric Nascimento	Nascimento Motorsports	Chevrolet	57	0	Vibration	73
22	21	21	Alex Malycke	Nascimento Motorsports	Toyota	11	0	Electrical	22
23	23	27	Bobby Hillis Jr.	Fierce Creature Racing	Chevrolet	2	0	Suspension	21
24	24	0	Tony Huffman	Fierce Creature Racing	Chevrolet	1	0	Suspension	20
Official race results

== Standings after the race ==
Drivers' Championship standings

Pos	Driver	Points
1	Sean Hingorani	603
2	Tyler Reif	584 (–19)
3	Trevor Huddleston	556 (–47)
4	Jack Wood	534 (–69)
5	Kyle Keller	512 (–91)
6	Eric Johnson Jr.	490 (–113)
7	Takuma Koga	472 (–131)
8	David Smith	426 (–177)
9	Todd Souza	390 (–213)
10	Nick Joanides	310 (–293)

- Note: Only the first 10 positions are included for the driver standings.

Previous race: 2024 NAPA Auto Parts 150 (Kern Raceway)	ARCA Menards Series West; 2024 season	Next race: 2025 West Coast Stock Car Motorsports Hall of Fame 150
