= Adrián Ferrer =

Spanish racing driver

- Born: February 15, 2009 (age 17); Getafe, Madrid, Spain

ARCA Menards Series career
- 1 race run over 1 year
- Best finish: 119th (2025)
- First race: 2025 General Tire 150 (Phoenix)
Wins	Top tens	Poles
0	0	0

ARCA Menards Series West career
- 2 races run over 1 year
- Best finish: 35th (2025)
- First race: 2025 West Coast Stock Car Motorsports Hall of Fame 150 (Kern County)
- Last race: 2025 General Tire 150 (Phoenix)
Wins	Top tens	Poles
0	1	0
- Statistics up to date as of November 2, 2025.

Adrián Benito Ferrer (born February 15, 2009) is a Spanish professional auto racing driver who last competed part-time in both the ARCA Menards Series and the ARCA Menards Series West, driving the No. 3 Toyota for Central Coast Racing.

== Racing career ==
Ferrer has previously competed in the GR Cup Spain, where he won the championship after winning two races in 2024.

In 2025, it was announced that Ferrer would move to the ARCA Menards Series West, driving the No. 3 Toyota full-time for Central Coast Racing. He had previously driven for the team at the Farewell Extravaganza at Irwindale Speedway the previous year. However, he left the team after the second race of the year at Phoenix Raceway.

== Motorsports career results ==
=== ARCA Menards Series ===
(key) (Bold – Pole position awarded by qualifying time. Italics – Pole position earned by points standings or practice time. * – Most laps led. ** – All laps led.)

ARCA Menards Series results
Year	Team	No.	Make	1	2	3	4	5	6	7	8	9	10	11	12	13	14	15	16	17	18	19	20	AMSC	Pts	Ref
2025	Central Coast Racing	3	Toyota	DAY	PHO; 18	TAL	KAN	CLT	MCH	BLN	ELK	LRP	DOV	IRP	IOW	GLN	ISF	MAD	DSF	BRI	SLM	KAN	TOL	119th	26	

==== ARCA Menards Series West ====
ARCA Menards Series West results
Year	Team	No.	Make	1	2	3	4	5	6	7	8	9	10	11	12	AMSWC	Pts	Ref
2025	Central Coast Racing	3	Toyota	KER; 7	PHO; 18	TUC; Wth	CNS	KER	SON	TRI	PIR	AAS	MAD	LVS	PHO	35th	63	

=== CARS Pro Late Model Tour ===
(key)

CARS Pro Late Model Tour results
Year	Team	No.	Make	1	2	3	4	5	6	7	8	9	10	11	12	13	CPLMTC	Pts	Ref
2025	MCM Racing Development	8	N/A	AAS	CDL	OCS	ACE; 6	NWS	CRW	HCY	HCY	AND	FLC	SBO	TCM	NWS	50th	36	
