= 2025 West Coast Stock Car Motorsports Hall of Fame 150 =

1st race of the 2025 ARCA Menards Series West

Race details
- Race 1 of 12 of the 2025 ARCA Menards Series West
- Date: January 25, 2025
- Official name: 9th Annual West Coast Stock Car Motorsports Hall of Fame 150
- Location: Kevin Harvick's Kern Raceway in Bakersfield, California
- Course: Permanent racing facility
- Course length: 0.50 miles (0.80 km)
- Distance: 150 laps, 75 mi (120 km)
- Scheduled distance: 150 laps, 75 mi (120 km)
- Average speed: 85.254 mph (137.203 km/h)

Pole position
Driver	Daniel Hemric	Bill McAnally Racing
- Time: 18.164

Most laps led
Driver	Trevor Huddleston	High Point Racing
- Laps: 144

Winner
No. 50	Trevor Huddleston	High Point Racing

Television in the United States
- Network: FloRacing
- Announcers: Charles Krall

Radio in the United States
- Radio: ARCA Racing Network

The 2025 West Coast Stock Car Motorsports Hall of Fame 150 was the 1st stock car race of the 2025 ARCA Menards Series West season, and the 9th running of the event. The race was held on Saturday, January 25, 2025, at Kevin Harvick's Kern Raceway in Bakersfield, California, a 0.50 mile (0.80 km) permanent asphalt quad-oval shaped short track. The race took the scheduled 150 laps to complete. In a wild finish, Trevor Huddleston, driving for High Point Racing, would take the win after a hard-fought battle between Kyle Keller, driving for Jan's Towing Racing, in the final few laps of the race. This was Huddleston's sixth career ARCA Menards Series West win. Pole-sitter Daniel Hemric fell back from the first lap to finish 9th. Huddleston led a race high 144 laps. To fill out the podium, Keller and Tanner Reif, driving for Central Coast Racing would finish 2nd and 3rd respectively.

== Report ==
=== Background ===
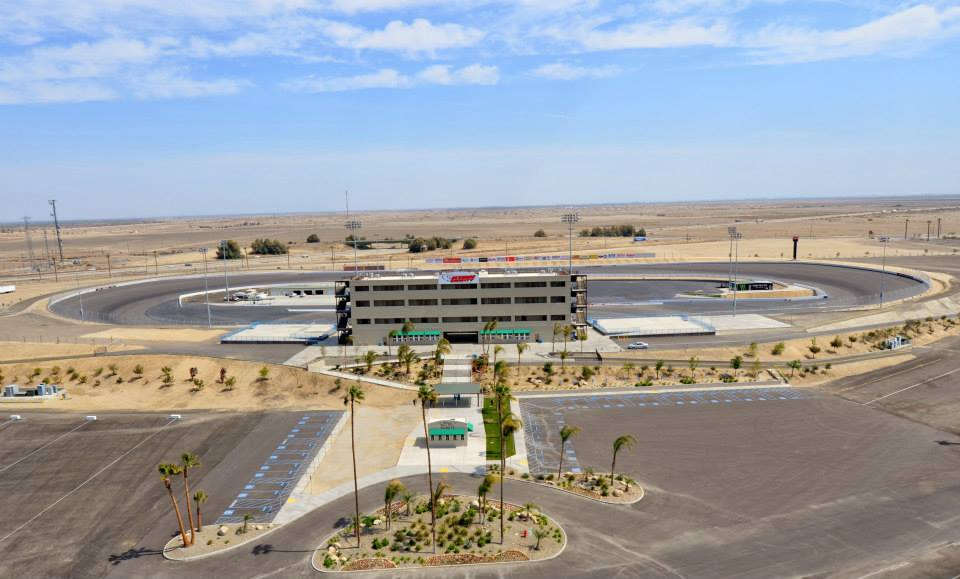
Kevin Harvick's Kern Raceway, the track where the race was held.

Kevin Harvick's Kern Raceway (formerly Kern County Raceway Park) is a 0.5-mile (0.80 km) oval speedway located on CA 43 (Enos Lane) just off Interstate 5 in Bakersfield, Kern County, California, United States. Opened in 2013, it was built as a replacement for Mesa Marin Raceway.

Kevin Harvick's Kern Raceway hosts events with NASCAR's Whelen All-American Series along with an ARCA Menards Series West race since 2013.

The track has banks of 8° in the straightaways, with 14° paved corners. The track has 15,000 seats for fans, and room to expand to 17,000 seats for various events. It also contains 21 suites in the grandstand along with 18 concession stands.

==== Entry list ====
- (R) denotes rookie driver.

#	Driver	Team	Make	Sponsor
3	Adrián Ferrer (R)	Central Coast Racing	Toyota	Central Coast Cabinets
05	David Smith	Shockwave Motorsports	Toyota	Shockwave Marine Suspension Seating
5	Eric Johnson Jr.	Jerry Pitts Racing	Toyota	Sherwin-Williams
7	Gavin Ray	Jerry Pitts Racing	Toyota	Jerry Pitts Racing
9	Robbie Kennealy	Jan's Towing Racing	Ford	Jan's Towing
13	Tanner Reif	Central Coast Racing	Toyota	Central Coast Cabinets
19	Daniel Hemric	Bill McAnally Racing	Chevrolet	NAPA Auto Care
42	Spencer Davis	Cook Racing Technologies	Chevrolet	MMI / Sunwest Construction
50	Trevor Huddleston	High Point Racing	Ford	High Point Racing / Racecar Factory
51	Blake Lothian (R)	Strike Mamba Racing	Chevrolet	The Texas Lawbook
71	Kyle Keller	Jan's Towing Racing	Ford	Jan's Towing / Battle Born Racing
72	Cody Dennison	Strike Mamba Racing	Chevrolet	Timcast
Official entry list

== Practice ==
The first and only practice session was held on Saturday, January 25, at 9:30 AM PST, and would last for 1 hour. Daniel Hemric, driving for Bill McAnally Racing, would set the fastest time in the session, with a lap of 18.116, and a speed of 99.360 mph (159.904 km/h).

Pos.	#	Driver	Team	Make	Time	Speed
1	19	Daniel Hemric	Bill McAnally Racing	Chevrolet	18.116	99.360
2	9	Robbie Kennealy	Jan's Towing Racing	Ford	18.300	98.361
3	13	Tanner Reif	Central Coast Racing	Toyota	18.318	98.264
Full practice results

== Qualifying ==
Qualifying was held on Saturday, January 25, at 11:00 AM PST. The qualifying system used is a multi-car, multi-lap based system. All drivers will be on track for a 20-minute timed session, and whoever sets the fastest time in the session will win the pole.

Daniel Hemric, driving for Bill McAnally Racing, would score the pole for the race, with a lap of 19.164, and a speed of 99.097 mph (159.481 km/h).

=== Qualifying results ===
Pos.	#	Driver	Team	Make	Time	Speed
1	19	Daniel Hemric	Bill McAnally Racing	Chevrolet	18.164	99.097
2	13	Tanner Reif	Central Coast Racing	Toyota	18.233	98.722
3	71	Kyle Keller	Jan's Towing Racing	Ford	18.273	98.506
4	50	Trevor Huddleston	High Point Racing	Ford	18.333	98.184
5	5	Eric Johnson Jr.	Jerry Pitts Racing	Toyota	13.344	98.125
6	9	Robbie Kennealy	Jan's Towing Racing	Ford	13.355	98.066
7	3	Adrián Ferrer (R)	Central Coast Racing	Toyota	18.357	98.055
8	42	Spencer Davis	Cook Racing Technologies	Chevrolet	18.466	97.476
9	7	Gavin Ray	Jerry Pitts Racing	Toyota	18.844	95.521
10	51	Blake Lothian (R)	Strike Mamba Racing	Chevrolet	18.900	95.238
11	72	Cody Dennison	Strike Mamba Racing	Chevrolet	19.164	93.926
12	05	David Smith	Shockwave Motorsports	Toyota	19.784	90.983
Official qualifying results

== Race results ==
Fin	St	#	Driver	Team	Make	Laps	Led	Status	Pts
1	4	50	Trevor Huddleston	High Point Racing	Ford	150	144	Running	48
2	3	71	Kyle Keller	Jan's Towing Racing	Ford	150	0	Running	42
3	2	13	Tanner Reif	Central Coast Racing	Toyota	150	6	Running	42
4	6	9	Robbie Kennealy	Jan's Towing Racing	Ford	150	0	Running	40
5	5	5	Eric Johnson Jr.	Jerry Pitts Racing	Toyota	150	0	Running	39
6	9	7	Gavin Ray	Jerry Pitts Racing	Toyota	150	0	Running	38
7	7	3	Adrián Ferrer (R)	Central Coast Racing	Toyota	149	0	Running	37
8	11	72	Cody Dennison	Strike Mamba Racing	Chevrolet	148	0	Running	36
9	1	19	Daniel Hemric	Bill McAnally Racing	Chevrolet	147	0	Mechanical	36
10	12	05	David Smith	Shockwave Motorsports	Toyota	139	0	Running	34
11	10	51	Blake Lothian (R)	Strike Mamba Racing	Chevrolet	138	0	Running	33
12	8	42	Spencer Davis	Cook Racing Technologies	Chevrolet	104	0	Electrical	32
Official race results

== Standings after the race ==
Drivers' Championship standings

Pos	Driver	Points
1	Trevor Huddleston	48
2	Kyle Keller	42 (-4)
3	Tanner Reif	42 (–4)
4	Robbie Kennealy	40 (–8)
5	Eric Johnson Jr.	39 (–9)
6	Gavin Ray	38 (–10)
7	Adrián Ferrer	37 (–11)
8	Cody Dennison	36 (–12)
9	Daniel Hemric	36 (–12)
10	David Smith	34 (–14)

- Note: Only the first 10 positions are included for the driver standings.

Previous race: 2024 Desert Diamond Casino West Valley 100	ARCA Menards Series West; 2025 season	Next race: 2025 General Tire 150 (Phoenix)
