= Toro Rodríguez =

Mexican racing driver (born 2004)

Esteban Rodríguez
- Born: May 5, 2004 (age 22); Monterrey, Mexico

ARCA Menards Series career
- 2 races run over 1 year
- Best finish: 65th (2026)
- First race: 2026 JR & CO. 150 (Iowa)
- Last race: 2026 Menards 150 (Kansas)
Wins	Top tens	Poles
0	1	0

ARCA Menards Series East career
- 4 races run over 1 year
- Best finish: 14th (2026)
- First race: 2026 Cook Out 200 (Hickory)
- Last race: 2026 JR & CO. 150 (Iowa)
Wins	Top tens	Poles
0	2	0

ARCA Menards Series West career
- 2 races run over 1 year
- Best finish: 43rd (2026)
- First race: 2026 Desert Diamond Casino West Valley 100 (Phoenix)
- Last race: 2026 NAPA Auto Parts 150 (Bakersfield)
Wins	Top tens	Poles
0	0	0
- Statistics up to date as of November 2, 2026.

Esteban "Toro" Rodríguez (born May 5, 2004) is a Mexican professional auto racing driver. He last competed part-time in the ARCA Menards Series East, driving the No. 38 Toyota for MCM Racing Development.

== Racing career ==
In 2022, Rodríguez raced in the NACAM Formula 4 Championship, where he drove for RE Motorsport. He finished 13th in the standings with 50 points.

Rodríguez returned to the team the following season, where he finished seventh in the standings with four podium finishes. That same year, he ran full-time in the Mikel's Truck Series, driving the No. 8 for HO Speed, where he had nine top-tens and five top-five finishes.

In 2024, Rodríguez returned to the Mikel's Truck Series, where he finished third in the points after finishing in the top-ten in all but one race held that year. That same year, he ran in the NASCAR Mexico Challenge Series for all but one race, where he finished 12th in the standings. It was also during this year that he raced in the United States, where he competed in the season finale for the Alabama State Asphalt Championship at Montgomery Motor Speedway.

In 2025, Rodríguez continued to run in the Challenge Series, where he finished eighth in the standings. He also competed in various late model events in the United States, where he drove in series such as the zMAX CARS Pro Late Model Tour, the World Series of Asphalt Stock Car Racing, the Carolina Pro Late Model Series, and the South Atlantic Pro Series.

In 2026, it was revealed that Rodríguez would make his debut in the ARCA Menards Series East at Hickory Motor Speedway, driving the No. 38 Toyota for MCM Racing Development.

== Motorsports career results ==
=== Single seater career summary ===
Season	Series	Team	Races	Wins	Poles	F/Laps	Podiums	Points	Position
2022	NACAM Formula 4 Championship	RE Motorsport	14	0	0	0	0	50	13th
2023	NACAM Formula 4 Championship	RE Motorsport	14	0	0	0	4	124	7th

=== Stock car career summary ===
Season	Series	Team	Races	Wins	Top 5	Top 10	Points	Position
2025	CARS Pro Late Model Tour	MCM Racing Development	3	0	0	0	72	27th
2026	IHRA Pro Late Model Series	MCM Racing Development	3	0	0	3	118	5th
2026	ARCA Menards Series West	MCM Racing Development	2	0	0	0	45	43rd
2026	ARCA Menards Series East	MCM Racing Development	4	0	0	2	139	14th
2026	ARCA Menards Series	MCM Racing Development	2	0	0	1	65	65th

=== Complete NACAM Formula 4 Championship results ===
(key) (Races in bold indicate pole position) (Races in italics indicate fastest lap)

Year	Team	1	2	3	4	5	6	7	8	9	10	11	12	13	14	15	16	17	18	19	20	DC	Points
2022	RE Motorsport	QUE; 1	QUE; 2	QUE; 3	AHR1; 1 Ret	AHR1; 2; 5	AHR1; 3; 5	PUE; 1 WD	PUE; 2 WD	PUE; 3 WD	AHR2; 1; 11	AHR2; 2; 10	AHR2; 3; 9	AHR3; 1; 6	AHR3; 2; 10†	AHR3; 3 Ret	AHR4; 1; 6	AHR4; 2; 5				13th	50
2023	RE Motorsport	CMX1; 1	CMX1; 2	CMX1; 3	QUE1; 1 Ret	QUE1; 2 Ret	QUE1; 3; 3	CMX2; 1; 8†	CMX2; 2; 3	CMX2; 3; 5	CMX3; 1	CMX3; 2	CMX3; 3	QUE2; 1; 3	QUE2; 2; 4	QUE2; 3; 4	PUE; 1; 6	PUE; 2; 3	PUE; 3; 5	CMX4; 1; 9	CMX4; 2; 7	7th	124

=== ARCA Menards Series ===
(key) (Bold – Pole position awarded by qualifying time. Italics – Pole position earned by points standings or practice time. * – Most laps led.)

ARCA Menards Series results
Year	Team	No.	Make	1	2	3	4	5	6	7	8	9	10	11	12	13	14	15	16	17	18	19	20	AMSC	Pts	Ref
2026	MCM Racing Development	38	Toyota	DAY	PHO	KAN	TAL	GLN	TOL	MCH	POC	BER	ELK	CHI	LRP	IRP	IOW; 13	ISF	MAD	DSF	SLM	BRI	KAN; 10	65th	65	

==== ARCA Menards Series East ====
ARCA Menards Series East results
Year	Team	No.	Make	1	2	3	4	5	6	7	8	AMSEC	Pts	Ref
2026	MCM Racing Development	38	Toyota	HCY; 11	CAR	NSV; 7	TOL	IRP	FRS; 6	IOW; 13	BRI	14th	139	

==== ARCA Menards Series West ====
ARCA Menards Series West results
Year	Team	No.	Make	1	2	3	4	5	6	7	8	9	10	11	12	13	AMSWC	Pts	Ref
2026	MCM Racing Development	37	Toyota	KER	PHO	TUC	SHA	CNS	TRI	SON	PIR	AAS	MAD	LVS	PHO; 25	KER; 18	43rd	45	

=== CARS Pro Late Model Tour ===
(key)

CARS Pro Late Model Tour results
Year	Team	No.	Make	1	2	3	4	5	6	7	8	9	10	11	12	13	CPLMTC	Pts	Ref
2025	MCM Racing Development	8	Chevy	AAS	CDL	OCS	ACE	NWS; 21	CRW	HCY	HCY; 19	AND; 14	FLC	SBO	TCM	NWS	27th	72	

=== IHRA Pro Late Model Series ===
(key) (Bold – Pole position awarded by qualifying time. Italics – Pole position earned by points standings or practice time. * – Most laps led. ** – All laps led.)

IHRA Pro Late Model Series
Year	Team	No.	Make	1	2	3	ISCSS	Pts	Ref
2026	MCM Racing Development	8	Toyota	DUB; 9	CDL; 8	AND; 9	5th	118	
