= 2023 NACAM Formula 4 Championship =

Auto racing series

Seasons
- ← 2022 2024 →

The 2023 NACAM Formula 4 Championship season was the seventh season of the NACAM Formula 4 Championship. It began on 15 April at Autódromo Hermanos Rodríguez in Mexico City and ended on 29 October at the same circuit.

== Teams and drivers ==
Team	No.	Driver	Rounds
(Mexico) Richards Motorsport	4	(Mexico) Diego de la Torre	1–2
(Mexico) Richards Motorsport	14	(Mexico) Dewey Richards	1–4, 7
(Mexico) F4 Morelia Racing Team	5	(Mexico) Julián Díaz	1–2
(Mexico) F4 Morelia Racing Team	55	(Mexico) Julián Díaz	2–7
(Mexico) F4 Morelia Racing Team	9	(Mexico) Daniel Forcadell	1, 6–7
(Mexico) F4 Morelia Racing Team	9	(Mexico) Juan Contreras	3
(Mexico) F4 Morelia Racing Team	10	(Mexico) Juan Contreras	1, 4–7
(Mexico) F4 Morelia Racing Team	10	(Mexico) Joe Sandoval	1, 3
(Mexico) Ram Racing	5	(Mexico) Alexandra Mohnhaupt	1
(Mexico) Ram Racing	95	(Mexico) Alexandra Mohnhaupt	2
(Mexico) Ram Racing	16	(Mexico) Alejandro Berumen	5–7
(Mexico) Ram Racing	22	(Mexico) Arturo Flores	1–2
(Mexico) Ram Racing	28	(Colombia) David Esteban Cárdenas	All
(Mexico) Ram Racing	36	(Colombia) Pedro Juan Moreno	1–6
(Mexico) Ram Racing	36	(Mexico) José Carlos Hernández	7
(Mexico) Ram Racing	53	(Mexico) Moy Zagursky	2–7
(Mexico) RE Motorsport	11	(Mexico) Esteban Rodríguez	2–3, 5–7
(Mexico) RE Motorsport	18	(Mexico) Apolo Madrigal	4
(Mexico) RE Motorsport	88	(Mexico) Cristian Cantú	All
(Mexico) Santinel Racing Team	13	(Mexico) Marco Alquicira	All
(Mexico) Santinel Racing Team	44	(Mexico) Eduardo Alquicira	All
(Mexico) Santinel Racing Team	44	(Mexico) Adan Ibarra	2
(Mexico) Zapata	20	(Mexico) Ivanna Richards	6
(United States) International Motorsport	22	(Mexico) Arturo Flores	3–7
HRI Mexico	95	(Mexico) Alexandra Mohnhaupt	7

== Race calendar ==
All rounds were held in Mexico. The first six rounds were a part of the Copa Notiauto series roster, whereas the last round was held in the support of the 2023 Mexico City Grand Prix. Initially, the non-championship round was scheduled to be staged after the season finale on 15–16 December before being cancelled.

Round		Circuit	Date	Pole position	Fastest lap	Winning driver	Winning team
1	R1	Autódromo Hermanos Rodríguez (Grand Prix Circuit without Foro Sol, Mexico City)	15 April	(Colombia) Pedro Juan Moreno	(Colombia) Pedro Juan Moreno	(Colombia) Pedro Juan Moreno	(Mexico) Ram Racing
1	R2	Autódromo Hermanos Rodríguez (Grand Prix Circuit without Foro Sol, Mexico City)	16 April		(Colombia) Pedro Juan Moreno	(Colombia) Pedro Juan Moreno	(Mexico) Ram Racing
1	R3	Autódromo Hermanos Rodríguez (Grand Prix Circuit without Foro Sol, Mexico City)	16 April	(Colombia) Pedro Juan Moreno	(Colombia) Pedro Juan Moreno	(Mexico) Cristian Cantú	(Mexico) RE Motorsport
2	R1	Autódromo de Querétaro (El Marqués, Querétaro)	20 May	(Mexico) Diego de la Torre	(Colombia) Pedro Juan Moreno	(Mexico) Marco Alquicira	(Mexico) Santinel Racing Team
2	R2	Autódromo de Querétaro (El Marqués, Querétaro)	21 May		(Colombia) Pedro Juan Moreno	(Mexico) Cristian Cantú	(Mexico) RE Motorsport
2	R3	Autódromo de Querétaro (El Marqués, Querétaro)	21 May	(Mexico) Diego de la Torre	(Colombia) Pedro Juan Moreno	(Colombia) Pedro Juan Moreno	(Mexico) Ram Racing
3	R1	Autódromo Hermanos Rodríguez (Grand Prix Circuit, Mexico City)	30 June	(Colombia) Pedro Juan Moreno	(Colombia) Pedro Juan Moreno	(Colombia) Pedro Juan Moreno	(Mexico) Ram Racing
3	R2	Autódromo Hermanos Rodríguez (Grand Prix Circuit, Mexico City)	1 July		(Colombia) Pedro Juan Moreno	(Colombia) Pedro Juan Moreno	(Mexico) Ram Racing
3	R3	Autódromo Hermanos Rodríguez (Grand Prix Circuit, Mexico City)	1 July	(Colombia) Pedro Juan Moreno	(Colombia) Pedro Juan Moreno	(Colombia) Pedro Juan Moreno	(Mexico) Ram Racing
4	R1	Autódromo Hermanos Rodríguez (Grand Prix Circuit, Mexico City)	4 August	(Colombia) Pedro Juan Moreno	(Colombia) Pedro Juan Moreno	(Colombia) Pedro Juan Moreno	(Mexico) Ram Racing
4	R2	Autódromo Hermanos Rodríguez (Grand Prix Circuit, Mexico City)	5 August		(Colombia) Pedro Juan Moreno	(Colombia) Pedro Juan Moreno	(Mexico) Ram Racing
4	R3	Autódromo Hermanos Rodríguez (Grand Prix Circuit, Mexico City)	5 August	(Colombia) David Esteban Cárdenas	(Colombia) Pedro Juan Moreno	(Colombia) Pedro Juan Moreno	(Mexico) Ram Racing
5	R1	Autódromo de Querétaro (El Marqués, Querétaro)	2 September	(Mexico) Cristian Cantú	(Mexico) Cristian Cantú	(Colombia) Pedro Juan Moreno	(Mexico) Ram Racing
5	R2	Autódromo de Querétaro (El Marqués, Querétaro)	3 September		(Mexico) Julián Díaz	(Mexico) Marco Alquicira	(Mexico) Santinel Racing Team
5	R3	Autódromo de Querétaro (El Marqués, Querétaro)	3 September	(Mexico) Cristian Cantú	(Colombia) Pedro Juan Moreno	(Mexico) Cristian Cantú	(Mexico) RE Motorsport
6	R1	Autódromo Miguel E. Abed (Short Int. Circuit, Amozoc, Puebla)	7 October	(Colombia) Pedro Juan Moreno	(Mexico) Cristian Cantú	(Mexico) Cristian Cantú	(Mexico) RE Motorsport
6	R2	Autódromo Miguel E. Abed (Short Int. Circuit, Amozoc, Puebla)	8 October		(Mexico) Cristian Cantú	(Colombia) Pedro Juan Moreno	(Mexico) Ram Racing
6	R3	Autódromo Miguel E. Abed (Short Int. Circuit, Amozoc, Puebla)	8 October	(Colombia) Pedro Juan Moreno	(Colombia) Pedro Juan Moreno	(Mexico) Cristian Cantú	(Mexico) RE Motorsport
7	R1	Autódromo Hermanos Rodríguez (Grand Prix Circuit, Mexico City)	28 October	(Mexico) Cristian Cantú	(Mexico) Cristian Cantú	(Mexico) Cristian Cantú	(Mexico) RE Motorsport
7	R2	Autódromo Hermanos Rodríguez (Grand Prix Circuit, Mexico City)	29 October		(Mexico) Cristian Cantú	(Mexico) Cristian Cantú	(Mexico) RE Motorsport
NC		Autódromo Hermanos Rodríguez (Grand Prix Circuit, Mexico City)	15–16 December	Cancelled			

== Championship standings ==
Points were awarded to the top 10 classified finishers in each race. The final standings were obtained by summing best five out of first six rounds and the final round.

Position	**1st**	**2nd**	**3rd**	**4th**	**5th**	**6th**	**7th**	**8th**	**9th**	**10th**
Points	25	18	15	12	10	8	6	4	2	1

=== Drivers' Championship ===
Pos	Driver	AHR1			QUE1			AHR2			AHR3			QUE2			PUE			AHR4		Pts
Pos	Driver	R1	R2	R3	R1	R2	R3	R1	R2	R3	R1	R2	R3	R1	R2	R3	R1	R2	R3	R1	R2	Pts
1	(Colombia) Pedro Juan Moreno	**1**	1	**7**	7	2	1	**1**	1	**1**	**1**	1	1	1	6	2	**2**	1	**3**			315
2	(Mexico) Cristian Cantú	2	3	1	2	1	8	3	7	2	2	2	2	**9**	3	**1**	1	5	1	**1**	1	311
3	(Colombia) David Esteban Cárdenas	4	2	2	6	3	2	4	9	3	3	4	**3**	6	5	7	5	2	4	3	8	219
4	(Mexico) Arturo Flores	5	Ret	4	9	5	4	2	5	7	4	3	5	7	8	6	4	4	2	Ret	3	174
5	(Mexico) Marco Alquicira	7†	5	6	1	7	5	6	2	4	Ret	Ret	Ret	4	1	Ret	9	Ret	6	8	2	172
6	(Mexico) Julián Díaz	Ret	6	5	8	8	7	5	Ret	6	7	6	6	5	2	8	DSQ	9	8	5	5	124
7	(Mexico) Esteban Rodríguez				Ret	Ret	3	8†	3	5				3	4	4	6	3	5	9	7	124
8	(Mexico) Moy Zagursky				Ret	DNS	DNS	7†	6	Ret	6	5	4	10†	7	5	11†	7	Ret	6	Ret	75
9	(Mexico) Alexandra Mohnhaupt	3	Ret	3	5	6	6													7	6	70
10	(Mexico) Alejandro Berumen													2	Ret	3	7	6	11†	Ret	11	47
11	(Mexico) Diego de la Torre	Ret	4	Ret	**3**	4	**9**†															41
12	(Mexico) Dewey Richards	DNS	Ret	DNS	4	Ret	Ret	Ret	4	10†	5	Ret	Ret							Ret	Ret	35
13	(Mexico) Daniel Forcadell	Ret	DNS	DNS													8	Ret	7	4	4	34
14	(Mexico) Juan Contreras	WD	WD	WD				Ret	8	9	10	8	8	8	9	10	10	10	10	11	10	26
15	(Mexico) Ivanna Richards																3	8	Ret			19
16	(Mexico) José Carlos Hernández																			2	12†	18
17	(Mexico) Joe Sandoval	6	7	8				WD	WD	WD												18
18	(Mexico) Eduardo Alquicira	DNS	Ret	DNS	WD	9†	DNS	Ret	DNS	8	9	9	DNS	11†	DNS	9	Ret	WD	9	10	9	17
19	(Mexico) Apolo Madrigal										8	7	7									16
20	(Mexico) Adan Ibarra				10	WD	WD															1
Pos	Driver	R1	R2	R3	R1	R2	R3	R1	R2	R3	R1	R2	R3	R1	R2	R3	R1	R2	R3	R1	R2	Pts
Pos	Driver	AHR1			QUE1			AHR2			AHR3			QUE2			PUE			AHR4		Pts

Colour	Result
Gold	Winner
Silver	Second place
Bronze	Third place
Green	Points classification
Blue	Non-points classification
Blue	Non-classified finish (NC)
Purple	Retired, not classified (Ret)
Red	Did not qualify (DNQ)
Red	Did not pre-qualify (DNPQ)
Black	Disqualified (DSQ)
White	Did not start (DNS)
White	Withdrew (WD)
White	Race cancelled (C)
Blank	Did not practice (DNP)
Blank	Did not arrive (DNA)
Blank	Excluded (EX)

**Bold** – Pole
Italics – Fastest Lap
