= Cook Racing Technologies =

NASCAR team

- Owner: Bruce Cook
- Base: Mooresville, North Carolina
- Series: ARCA Menards Series; ARCA Menards Series East; ARCA Menards Series West
- Race drivers: ARCA Menards Series: 17. TBA; 42. Nolan Wilson (part-time); ARCA Menards Series East: 17. TBA (part-time); ARCA Menards Series West: 17. TBA (part-time)
- Manufacturer: Chevrolet; Toyota
- Opened: 1998

Career
- Debut: Craftsman Truck Series: 2018 Villa Lighting delivers the Eaton 200 presented by CK Power (Gateway); ARCA Menards Series: 1998 Kentuckiana Ford Dealers 200 (Salem); ARCA Menards Series East: 2020 Skip's Western Outfitters 175 (New Smyrna); ARCA Menards Series West: 2021 General Tire 200 (Sonoma)
- Latest race: Craftsman Truck Series: 2025 Slim Jim 200 (Martinsville); ARCA Menards Series: 2026 Bush's Best 200 (Bristol); ARCA Menards Series East: 2026 Bush's Best 200 (Bristol); ARCA Menards Series West: 2026 NAPA Auto Parts 150 (Bakersfield)
- Races competed: Total: 121; Craftsman Truck Series: 14; ARCA Menards Series: 58; ARCA Menards Series East: 30; ARCA Menards Series West: 19
- Drivers' Championships: Total: 0 Craftsman Truck Series: 0 ARCA Menards Series: 0 ARCA Menards Series East: 0 ARCA Menards Series West: 0
- Race victories: Total: 6 Craftsman Truck Series: 0 ARCA Menards Series: 3 ARCA Menards Series East: 1 ARCA Menards Series West: 2
- Pole positions: Total: 1 Craftsman Truck Series: 0 ARCA Menards Series: 0 ARCA Menards Series East: 0 ARCA Menards Series West: 1

Cook Racing Technologies (formerly Cook-Finley Racing, and Chad Finley Racing) is an American professional stock car racing team that currently competes in the ARCA Menards Series, ARCA Menards Series East, and ARCA Menards Series West. In the ARCA Menards Series, they field the No. 17 and 42 Chevrolet SS/Toyota Camry part-time for multiple drivers. In the ARCA Menards Series East, they field the No. 17 Chevrolet SS/Toyota Camry part-time for Cory Roper and Kaden Honeycutt and the No. 42 Chevrolet SS for Taylor Mayhew. In the ARCA Menards Series West, they field the No. 17 Toyota Camry/Chevrolet SS for Taylor Mayhew and the No. 42 Chevrolet SS part-time for Jaiden Reyna. The team is owned by veteran crew chief Bruce Cook.

== History ==
Driver Chad Finley formed a part-time team in the ARCA Racing Series in 2016, where he would be the driver. it was his first season in the series since 2010 when he drove part-time for K-Automotive Motorsports. In the team's debut race at Michigan, they fielded the No. 51 Chevrolet, where they would start and finish thirteenth. Their next start came at IRP, and Finley had a strong fifth-place finish. He attempted one more race that year at Chicagoland, where Finley qualified fourth but did not finish the race, ending up in 23rd.

The team returned in 2017, and in their first start of the season, which came at Nashville, Finley pulled off an upset win.

On June 20, 2018, it was announced that Chad Finley would enter the summer Gateway race fielding his self-owned No. 42 Chevrolet. He started 20th and came home with an impressive 6th place finish. Finley and the No. 42 returned at Bristol. Finley started twelfth, but finished in a disappointing 30th place finish after an early exit due to an engine issue.

On December 5, 2018, it was announced that the No. 42 would run full-time in the 2019 season. Chad Finley, Robby Lyons, and other drivers were to split the ride throughout the season. The team qualified twentieth in the season-opener at Daytona with Robby Lyons behind the wheel, but would fall victim to an accident on lap 2, effectively ending their night. After the 30th place finish at Daytona, Chad Finley took the reins at Atlanta, where he started 30th before being involved in another accident, leaving them with a 28th place result. After the conclusion of this event, the team's hauler entered the incorrect and shorter tunnel when exiting the track (on the way back to the shop), sustaining severe damage to both the hauler and the race trucks inside. This forced the team to withdraw from both the spring Las Vegas, and Martinsville races. CFR returned in Texas, with Garrett Smithley driving the No. 42 this time, making his first start with the team. Smithley rolled off from the 25th position, before driving up through the field to finish a solid 15th place. Finley then took the wheel, starting and finishing in the eighteenth position at Charlotte. At Kentucky, Finley qualified in the twelfth spot and looked to have a good run going, before getting loose and backing into the third turn wall, effectively placing them in the 26th position.

On November 21, 2019, Finley announced the team's Truck Series assets had been sold to focus on racing in the American Ethanol Late Model Tour.

On January 30, 2020, it was announced that the team would be returning and debuting in the ARCA Menards Series East (formerly the NASCAR K&N Pro Series East), fielding the No. 42 Toyota part-time for Parker Retzlaff starting at Five Flags. With Finley focusing on running late models, the team's crew chief, Bruce Cook, took over most of the ownership of the stock-car team, and it was renamed Cook-Finley Racing. Cook and Retzlaff worked together at Visconti Motorsports in 2019 in two races. (Cook crew chiefed for both teams that year.) In addition, it was announced that the CFR team would have a partnership with Visconti this season.

== Craftsman Truck Series ==
=== Truck No. 42 history ===
In 2018, Chad Finley attempted this car for Gateway and Bristol, with a top-ten finish.

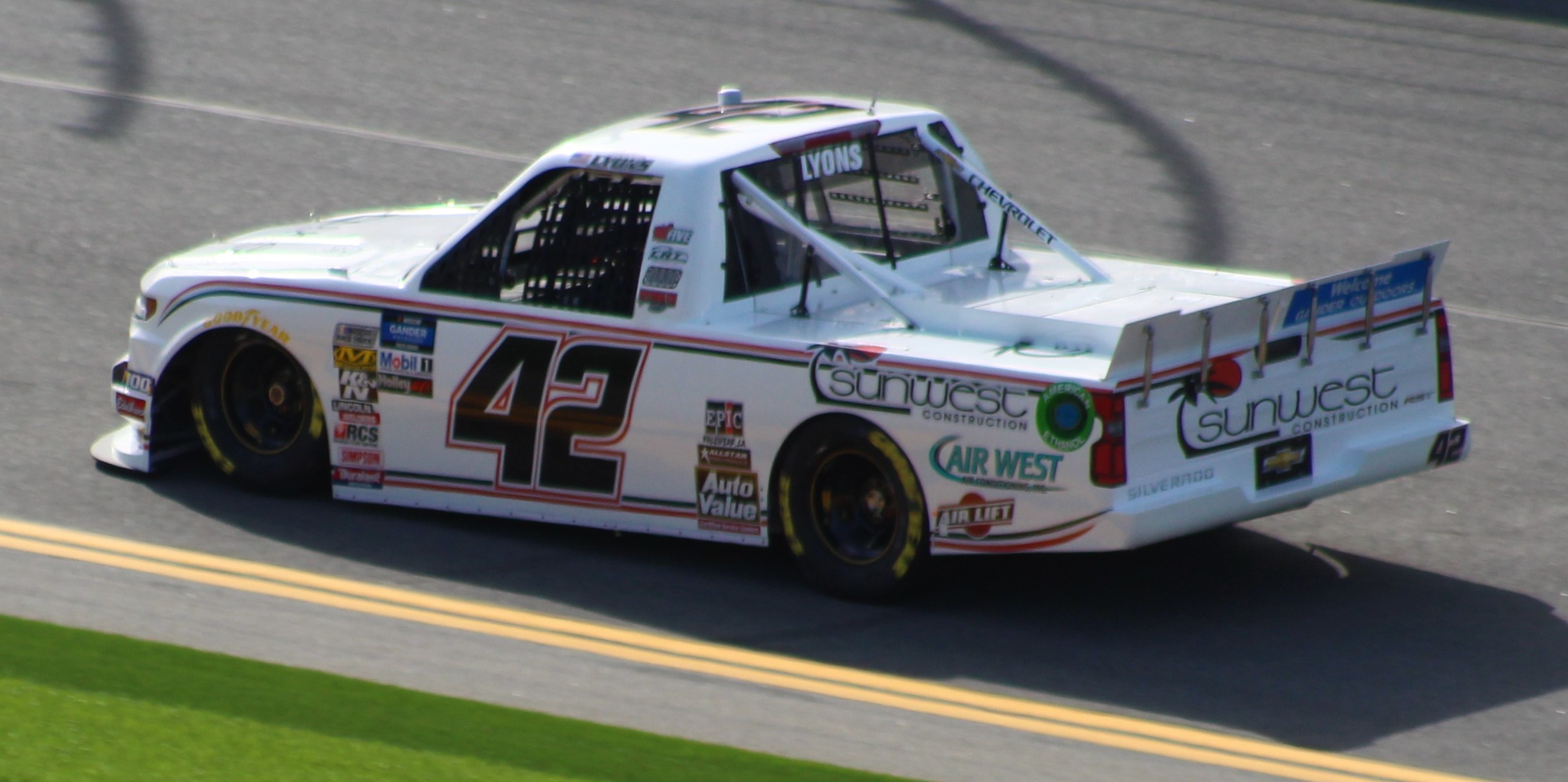
Lyons' truck at Daytona in 2019.

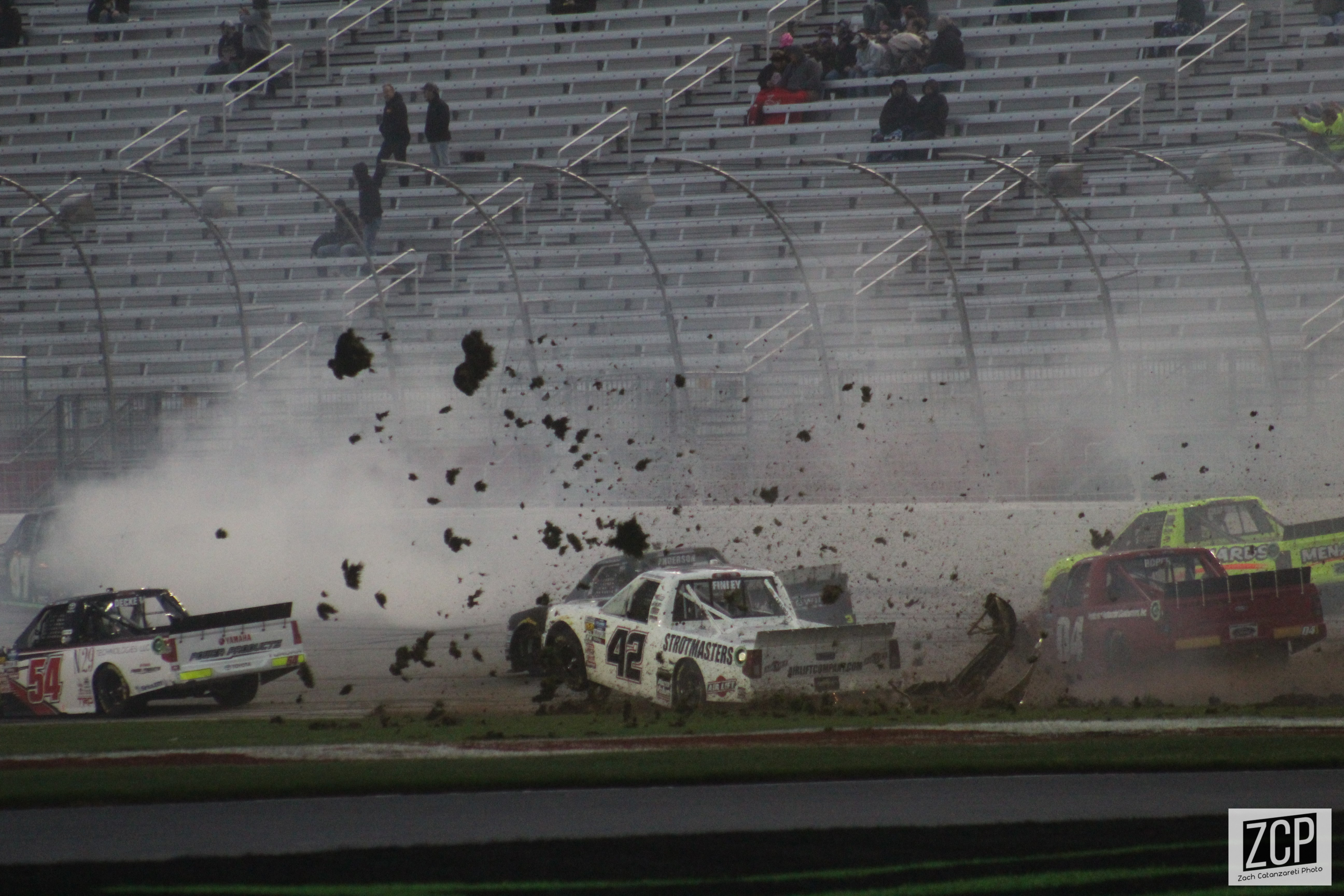
Finley crashing in the grass at Atlanta the following week.

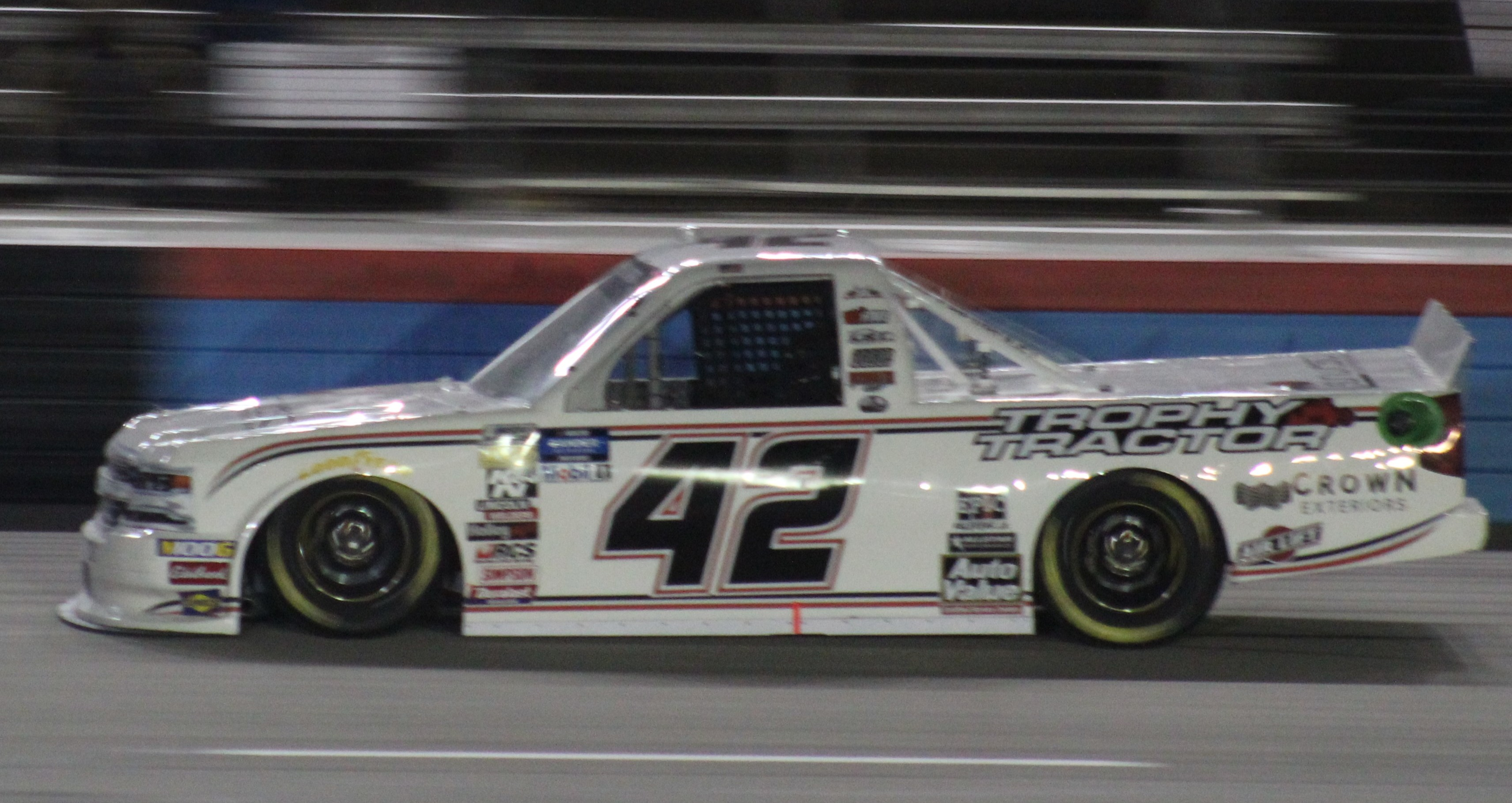
Smithley in his race for the team at Texas.

In 2019, Robby Lyons drove for Finley at Daytona, Finley himself drove for four races, and Garrett Smithley ran at Texas.

==== Truck No. 42 results ====
Year	Driver	No.	Make	1	2	3	4	5	6	7	8	9	10	11	12	13	14	15	16	17	18	19	20	21	22	23	NGOTC	Pts
2018	Chad Finley	42	Chevy	DAY	ATL	LVS	MAR	DOV	KAN	CLT	TEX	IOW	GTW; 6	CHI	KEN	ELD	POC	MCH	BRI; 30	MSP	LVS	TAL	MAR	TEX	PHO	HOM	48th	38
2019	Robby Lyons	42	Chevy	DAY; 30																							39th	77
2019	Chad Finley	42	Chevy		ATL; 28	LVS	MAR				CLT; 18	TEX	IOW; 28	GTW	CHI	KEN; 26	POC	ELD	MCH	BRI	MSP	LVS	TAL	MAR	PHO	HOM	39th	77
2019	Garrett Smithley	42	Chevy					TEX; 15	DOV	KAN																	39th	77

=== Truck No. 84 history ===
In 2022, Clay Greenfield attempted to qualify the No. 84 at Daytona, but failed to do so. Greenfield would attempt Nashville but did not qualify as well. Greenfield did manage to qualify at Talladega, where he finished 12th. He would fail to qualify again for the following race at Homestead. In 2023, Greenfield returned to the No. 84, where he qualified for the season opener at Daytona, but would crash out after twenty eight laps.

On March 24, 2025, it was reported that Patrick Staropoli would return to the NASCAR Craftsman Truck Series, driving the No. 84 at Martinsville.

==== Truck No. 84 results ====
Year	Driver	No.	Make	1	2	3	4	5	6	7	8	9	10	11	12	13	14	15	16	17	18	19	20	21	22	23	24	25	NCTC	Pts
2022	Clay Greenfield	84	Toyota	DAY; DNQ	LVS	ATL	COA	MAR	BRI	DAR	KAN	TEX	CLT	GTW	SON	KNO	NSH; DNQ	MOH	POC	IRP	RCH	KAN	BRI	TAL; 12	HOM; DNQ	PHO			45th	25
2023	Clay Greenfield	84	Toyota	DAY; 34	LVS	ATL	COA	TEX	BRD	MAR	KAN	DAR	NWS	CLT	GTW	NSH	MOH	POC	RCH	IRP	MLW	KAN	BRI	TAL	HOM	PHO			49th	3
2025	Patrick Staropoli	84	Toyota	DAY	ATL	LVS	HOM	MAR; 20	BRI; 29	CAR	TEX	KAN	NWS	CLT	NSH	MCH	POC	LRP	IRP	GLN	RCH; 23	DAR	BRI	NHA	ROV	TAL	MAR; 15	PHO	39th	61

== ARCA Menards Series ==
=== Car No. 17 history ===
In 2024, Marco Andretti would run up to fourteen races driving the No. 17 Chevrolet for the team across the main ARCA Menards Series, ARCA Menards Series East, and ARCA Menards Series West.

In 2025, it was announced that Patrick Staropoli would drive the No. 17 car at Kansas. Kaylee Bryson drove the No. 17 car at Madison.

On January 3, 2026, the team announced that Mini Tyrrell would attempt to make his ARCA Menards Series debut for the team in 2026 in the season opener at Daytona in the No. 17 car. He would also participate with the team in the pre-season test for the series at Daytona International Speedway.

==== Car No. 17 results ====
Year	Driver	No.	Make	1	2	3	4	5	6	7	8	9	10	11	12	13	14	15	16	17	18	19	20	ARSC	Pts
2024	Marco Andretti	17	Chevy	DAY; 25	PHO; 21	TAL	DOV; 19	KAN; 9	CLT	IOW; 22	MOH; 5	BLN	IRP; 7	SLM	ELK	MCH	ISF	MLW; 10	DSF	GLN; 14	BRI; 22	KAN; 23	TOL		
2025	Patrick Staropoli	17	Toyota	DAY	PHO	TAL	KAN; 22	CLT	MCH	BLN	ELK	LRP	DOV	IRP	IOW	GLN	ISF					KAN; 11	TOL	-*	-*
2025	Kaylee Bryson	17	Chevy															MAD; 8	DSF	BRI	SLM			-*	-*
2026	Mini Tyrrell	17	Chevy	DAY; 38																				23rd	301
2026	Taylor Mayhew	17	Toyota		PHO; 8																			23rd	301
2026	Monty Tipton	17	Toyota			KAN; 8																		23rd	301
2026	Monty Tipton	17	Chevy				TAL; 38																	23rd	301
2026	Kaden Honeycutt	17	Toyota					GLN; 1*	TOL	MCH	POC	BER	ELK	CHI		IRP; 1	IOW	ISF	MAD	DSF	SLM	BRI; 3	KAN	23rd	301
2026	Stewart Friesen	17	Toyota												LRP; 13									23rd	301

=== Car No. 41 history ===
In 2020, Kyle Sieg attempted to run two races in the No. 41 car.

==== Car No. 41 results ====
Year	Driver	No.	Make	1	2	3	4	5	6	7	8	9	10	11	12	13	14	15	16	17	18	19	20	ARSC	Pts
2020	Kyle Sieg	41	Chevy	DAY	PHO	TAL	POC	IRP	KEN	IOW	KAN	TOL	TOL	MCH	DAY	GTW; 11	L44	TOL	BRI; 17	WIN	MEM	ISF	KAN	35th	60

=== Car No. 42 history ===
In 2020, Kyle Sieg attempted this car at Lucas Oil Raceway, later on Parker Retzlaff would attempt the two East Combination races.

In 2021, Conner Jones would make his debut at Iowa, Tyler Ankrum in at the Glen, and Parker Retzlaff returning for Milwaukee.

In 2022, Christian Rose would race part-time in the No. 42.

==== Car No. 42 results ====
Year	Driver	No.	Make	1	2	3	4	5	6	7	8	9	10	11	12	13	14	15	16	17	18	19	20	ARSC	Pts
2020	Kyle Sieg	42	Chevy	DAY	PHO	TAL	POC	IRP; 10	KEN	IOW	KAN	TOL	TOL	MCH	DAY	GTW	L44							29th	95
2020	Parker Retzlaff	42	Toyota															TOL; 8	BRI; 19	WIN	MEM	ISF	KAN	29th	95
2021	Conner Jones	42	Chevy	DAY	PHO	TAL	KAN	TOL	CLT	MOH	POC	ELK	BLN	IOW; 21	WIN						BRI; 10	SLM	KAN	28th	112
2021	Tyler Ankrum	42	Chevy													GLN; 22	MCH	ISF						28th	112
2021	Parker Retzlaff	42	Toyota																MLW; 11	DSF				28th	112
2022	Christian Rose	42	Chevy	DAY; 31				CLT; 16	IOW	BLN	ELK		POC; 24	IRP; 20	MCH	GLN	ISF				BRI; 22	SLM		22nd	260
2022	Christian Rose	42	Toyota		PHO; 27	TAL	KAN											MLW; 15	DSF	KAN; 7				22nd	260
2022	Kris Wright	42	Chevy									MOH; 6												22nd	260
2022	Amber Slagle	42	Toyota																				TOL; 13	22nd	260
2023	Robby Lyons	42	Chevy	DAY; 17	PHO	TAL	KAN	CLT	BLN	ELK	MOH	IOW	POC	MCH	IRP	GLN	ISF	MLW	DSF	KAN					
2023	Matt Gould	42	Chevy																		BRI; 31	SLM	TOL		
2024	Tanner Reif	42	Chevy	DAY	PHO; 14	TAL	DOV; 22																		
2024	Tanner Reif	42	Toyota					KAN; 18	CLT	IOW	MOH	BLN	IRP	SLM	ELK	MCH	ISF	MLW	DSF						
2024	Brandon Jones	42	Chevy																	GLN; 3	BRI	KAN	TOL		
2026	Jaiden Reyna	42	Chevy	DAY	PHO; 14	KAN	TAL	GLN	TOL	MCH	POC	BER	ELK	CHI										27th	188
2026	Dawson Sutton	42	Chevy												LRP; 9	IRP	IOW	ISF						27th	188
2026	Taylor Mayhew	42	Chevy																MAD; 16	DSF	SLM; 18	BRI; 10		27th	188
2026	Mike Christopher Jr.	42	Toyota																				KAN; 9	27th	188

=== Car No. 51 history ===
In 2016, Chad Finley attempted to race in the No. 51 car part-time, and would do so for two more years. He scored one victory at Nashville Fairgrounds Speedway in 2017.

==== Car No. 51 results ====
Year	Driver	No.	Make	1	2	3	4	5	6	7	8	9	10	11	12	13	14	15	16	17	18	19	20	ARSC	Pts
2016	Chad Finley	51	Toyota	DAY	NSH	SLM	TAL	TOL	NJE	POC	MCH; 13	MAD	WIN	IOW	IRP; 5	POC	BLN	ISF	DSF	SLM					
2016	Chad Finley	51	Chevy																		CHI; 23	KEN	KAN		
2017	Chad Finley	51	Chevy	DAY	NSH; 1	SLM	TAL	TOL; 3	ELK	POC	MCH; 12	MAD	IOW	IRP; 3*	POC	WIN	ISF	ROA	DSF	SLM	CHI; 5	KEN	KAN; 11		
2018	Austin Hill	51	Chevy	DAY	NSH	SLM	TAL	TOL	CLT; 11	POC															
2018	Chad Finley	51	Chevy								MCH; 23	MAD	GTW	CHI	IOW	ELK	POC	ISF	BLN	DSF	SLM	IRP	KAN		

=== Car No. 82 history ===
In 2000, Jeff Finley fielded the No. 82 car for himself. He attempted to qualify for the first six races of the season but only managed to qualify for one race.

==== Car No. 82 results ====
Year	Driver	No.	Make	1	2	3	4	5	6	7	8	9	10	11	12	13	14	15	16	17	18	19	20	ARSC	Pts
2000	Jeff Finley	82	Chevy	DAY; DNQ	SLM; 13	AND; DNQ	CLT; DNQ	KIL; DNQ	FRS; DNQ	MCH	POC	TOL	KEN	BLN	POC	WIN	ISF	KEN	DSF	SLM	CLT	TAL	ATL		

=== Car No. 99 history ===
In 1998, Jeff Finley partnered with Ken Schrader to field the No. 99 car at Salem Speedway and Charlotte Motor Speedway.

==== Car No. 99 results ====
Year	Driver	No.	Make	1	2	3	4	5	6	7	8	9	10	11	12	13	14	15	16	17	18	19	20	21	22	ARSC	Pts
1998	Jeff Finley	99	Ford	DAY	ATL	SLM; 8	CLT; 18	MEM	MCH	POC	SBS	TOL	PPR	POC	KIL	FRS	ISF	ATL	DSF	SLM	TEX	WIN	CLT	TAL	ATL		

== ARCA Menards Series East ==
=== Car No. 17 history ===
In 2024, Marco Andretti would run five races driving the No. 17 Chevrolet for the team in the ARCA Menards Series East.

==== Car No. 17 results ====
Year	Driver	No.	Make	1	2	3	4	5	6	7	8	AMSEC	Pts
2024	Marco Andretti	17	Chevy	FIF	DOV; 19	NSV	FRS	IOW; 22	IRP; 7	MLW; 10	BRI; 22		
2026	Cory Roper	17	Chevy	HCY	ROC; 9	NSV	TOL					23rd	125
2026	Kaden Honeycutt	17	Toyota					IRP; 1	FRS	IOW	BRI; 3	23rd	125

=== Car No. 41 history ===
In 2020, Kyle Sieg attempted to run two races in the No. 41 car.

In 2021, Carson Kvapil, Josh Berry, and Morgan Alexander drove the No. 41 car part-time.

==== Car No. 41 results ====
Year	Driver	No.	Make	1	2	3	4	5	6	7	8	AMSEC	Pts
2020	Kyle Sieg	41	Chevy	NSM	TOL	DOV; 11	TOL	BRI; 17	FIF				
2021	Carson Kvapil	41	Chevy	NSM; 14	FIF; 11	NSV; 11							
2021	Josh Berry	41	Chevy				DOV; 2						
2021	Morgan Alexander	41	Chevy					SNM; 12	IOW	MLW	BRI		

=== Car No. 42 history ===
In 2020, Parker Retzlaff would sign with the team full-time, driving in the No. 42. He earned five top-tens, and one top-20, finishing fourth in the standings.

In 2021, Retzlaff would return to the No. 42 but only for a partial schedule. He would finish fourth at the Southern National Motorsports Park, making it his best career ARCA Menards Series East finish. Conner Jones would run two events in the No. 42 car, finishing 21st at Iowa and tenth at Bristol.

In 2022, Christian Rose made his ARCA Menards Series East debut at New Smyrna Speedway in the No. 42 car. He would drive in the rest of the East Series races that year except for Iowa.

==== Car No. 42 results ====
Year	Driver	No.	Make	1	2	3	4	5	6	7	8	AMSEC	Pts
2020	Parker Retzlaff	42	Toyota	NSM; 8	TOL; 7	DOV; 7	TOL; 8	BRI; 19	FIF; 10			4th	305
2021	Parker Retzlaff	42	Toyota	NSM; 9	FIF; 6	NSV; 7	DOV; 12	SNM; 4		MLW; 11			
2021	Conner Jones	42	Chevy						IOW; 21		BRI; 10		
2022	Christian Rose	42	Toyota	NSM; 11	FIF; 10	DOV; 10	NSV; 12	IOW	MLW; 15				
2022	Christian Rose	42	Chevy							BRI; 22			
2023	Matt Gould	42	Chevy	FIF	DOV	NSV	FRS	IOW	IRP	MLW	BRI; 31		
2024	Tanner Reif	42	Chevy	FIF	DOV; 22	NSV; 15	FRS	IOW	IRP	MLW	BRI		
2026	Taylor Mayhew	42	Chevy	HCY	ROC	NSV	TOL	IRP	FRS	IOW	BRI; 10	41st	34

== ARCA Menards Series West ==
=== Car No. 17 history ===
In 2024, Marco Andretti would run three races driving the No. 17 Chevrolet for the team in the ARCA Menards Series West. Buddy Shepherd made one start at Kern County Raceway Park.

In 2025, it was revealed that Kaylee Bryson would make her stock car racing debut in the ARCA Menards Series West race at Sonoma Raceway, driving the No. 17 car.

In 2026, Taylor Mayhew would run five races in the No. 17 car. He won at Las Vegas Motor Speedway Bullring.

==== Car No. 17 results ====
Year	Driver	No.	Make	1	2	3	4	5	6	7	8	9	10	11	12	13	AMSWC	Pts
2024	Marco Andretti	17	Chevy	PHO; 21	KER	PIR; 7	SON; 11	IRW	IRW	SHA	TRI	MAD	AAS					
2024	Buddy Shepherd	17	Chevy											KER; 20	PHO			
2025	Kaylee Bryson	17	Chevy	KER	PHO	TUC	CNS	KER	SON; 14	TRI	PIR	AAS	MAD	LVS	PHO; 18		-*	-*
2026	Taylor Mayhew	17	Toyota	KER; 3	PHO; 8	TUC	SHA	CNS	TRI								-*	-*
2026	Taylor Mayhew	17	Chevy							SON; 12	PIR	AAS	MAD	LVS; 1	PHO; 13	KER; 4	-*	-*

=== Car No. 42 history ===
In 2021, the team made their debut in the ARCA Menards Series West fielding the No. 42 car for Tony Toste and Christian Rose.

In 2022, the No. 42 car was driven by Rose and Landen Lewis. Lewis scored a victory at Kern County Raceway Park.

After not showing up in 2023, the No. 42 made a return in 2024 with Tanner Reif, Brandon Jones, and Spencer Davis.

In 2025, Davis drove the No. 42 car at season opener at Kern County.

In 2026, Jaiden Reyna drove the No. 42 car for the first two races of the season.

==== Car No. 42 results ====
Year	Driver	No.	Make	1	2	3	4	5	6	7	8	9	10	11	12	13	AMSWC	Pts
2021	Tony Toste	42	Toyota	PHO	SON; 18	IRW	CNS	IRW	PIR									
2021	Christian Rose	42	Toyota							LVS; 10	AAS; 7	PHO						
2022	Christian Rose	42	Toyota	PHO; 27	IRW				IRW; 16	EVG	PIR	AAS	LVS	PHO; 21				
2022	Landen Lewis	42	Chevy			KCR; 1	PIR	SON										
2024	Tanner Reif	42	Chevy	PHO; 14	KER													
2024	Brandon Jones	42	Chevy			PIR; 2*	SON; 8	IRW	IRW	SHA	TRI	MAD	AAS					
2024	Spencer Davis	42	Chevy											KER; 11	PHO			
2025	Spencer Davis	42	Chevy	KER; 12	PHO	TUC	CNS	KER	SON	TRI	PIR	AAS	MAD	LVS	PHO			
2026	Jaiden Reyna	42	Chevy	KER; 13	PHO; 14	TUC	SHA	CNS	TRI	SON	PIR	AAS	MAD	LVS	PHO	KER	-*	-*
