= 2024 Ligier European Series =

European racing season

The 2024 Ligier European Series was the fifth season of the Ligier European Series. The six–event season began at Circuit de Barcelona–Catalunya on 12 April, and ended at Algarve International Circuit on 19 October.

== Calendar ==
Round	Race	Circuit	Date	Map of circuit locations
1	Barcelona Heat	(Spain) Circuit de Barcelona–Catalunya	12–13 April	2024 Ligier European Series is located in Europe
2	Le Castellet Heat	(France) Circuit Paul Ricard	3–4 May	2024 Ligier European Series is located in Europe
3	Le Mans Heat	(France) Circuit de la Sarthe	9 June	2024 Ligier European Series is located in Europe
4	Spa–Francorchamps Heat	(Belgium) Circuit de Spa–Francorchamps	23–24 August	2024 Ligier European Series is located in Europe
5	Mugello Heat	(Italy) Mugello Circuit	27–28 September	2024 Ligier European Series is located in Europe
6	Portimao Heat	(Portugal) Algarve International Circuit	17–19 October	2024 Ligier European Series is located in Europe

== Teams and drivers ==
Team	No.	Drivers	Rounds
JS P4
(Poland) Team Virage	1	(United Kingdom) Haydn Chance	All
(Poland) Team Virage	1	(United Kingdom) Theo Micouris	All
(Poland) Team Virage	32	(Colombia) Lucas Medina	1
(Poland) Team Virage	32	(United Arab Emirates) Alim Geshev	1
(Poland) Team Virage	32	(Qatar) Paschalis Paris Stavrakidis	2
(Poland) Team Virage	32	(Switzerland) Umberto D'Amato	2–5
(Poland) Team Virage	32	(Switzerland) Jacopo D'Amato	3–5
(Poland) Team Virage	32	(Denmark) Mikkel Gaarde Pedersen	6
(Poland) Team Virage	32	(Republic of Ireland) Brandon McCaughan	6
(Poland) Team Virage	66	(Colombia) Jerónimo Berrío	All
(Poland) Team Virage	66	(Colombia) Pedro Juan Moreno	All
(Romania) Smart Driving	3	(Romania) Alin Fulga	1–2, 5
(Romania) Smart Driving	3	(Australia) Dylan Young	1–2
(Romania) Smart Driving	3	(Italy) Giacomo Pollini	3
(Romania) Smart Driving	3	(Italy) Simone Riccitelli	3
(United Kingdom) Nielsen Racing	4	(United Kingdom) Ben Caisley	All
(United Kingdom) Nielsen Racing	4	(United Kingdom) Logan Hannah	1–2
(France) ANS Motorsport	6	(France) Iko Segret	All
(Poland) Inter Europol Competition	7	(France) Romain Favre	1–5
(United Kingdom) Jolt Racing	26	(United Kingdom) Thomas Jack Lee	2
(France) Pegasus Racing	16	(Japan) Yuki Tanaka	1–4, 6
(France) Pegasus Racing	16	(Japan) Ryuichiro Ohtsuka	4
(France) Pegasus Racing	16	(France) Jordan Meyer	5
(France) Pegasus Racing	16	(Japan) Tadao Uematsu	6
(United Kingdom) P4 Racing	27	(United Kingdom) Andrew Ferguson	3
(United Kingdom) P4 Racing	27	(United Kingdom) Jeremy Ferguson	4
(Spain) ASM Motorsport	44	(Portugal) André Vieira	1, 3–6
(France) Les Deux Arbres	58	(France) Jacques Nicolet	3–4
(France) M Racing	58	(France) Jacques Nicolet	5–6
(Italy) Monza Garage	71	(Taiwan) Chun-Ting Chou	All
(Italy) Monza Garage	71	(Australia) James Winslow	All
(United Kingdom) RLR MSport	77	(Mexico) Ian Aguilera	All
(Italy) LR Motorsport	81	(Austria) Michael Doppelmayr	3
(Italy) LR Motorsport	81	(Germany) Pierre Kaffer	3
(Italy) LR Motorsport	81	(Switzerland) Jacopo Mazza	5
(Italy) LR Motorsport	81	(Italy) Manuel Quondamcarlo	5–6
(Italy) LR Motorsport	81	(Italy) Jody Simone Vullo	6
JS2 R
(France) Loire Valley Racing	9	(France) Edouard Hery	3
(France) Pegasus Racing	18	(France) Louis Stern	All
(France) Pegasus Racing	18	(France) Paul Lanchère	2
(France) Pegasus Racing	18	(France) Gwenaël Delomier	5
(France) Pegasus Racing	29	(France) Julien Schell	All
(France) Pegasus Racing	29	(France) David Caussanel	All
(France) ANS Motorsport	31	(France) Clément Moreno	1–5
(France) ANS Motorsport	31	(France) Paul Trojani	6
(France) ANS Motorsport	37	Jérôme France	3
(France) ANS Motorsport	73	(Belgium) Didier Balcaen	3
(France) No Limit Racing	46	(France) Sébastien Margot	3
(France) LADC Motorsport	49	(France) Hervé Tremblaye	3
(France) LADC Motorsport	61	(France) Steven Palette	3
(France) LADC Motorsport	61	(France) Léo Payen	3
(France) LADC Motorsport	90	(France) Clément Loeul	3
(France) Les Deux Arbres	50	(France) Noé Da Cuhna	1–5
(France) Les Deux Arbres	50	(France) Antoine Lepesqueux	1–5
(France) Les Deux Arbres	86	(France) Sacha Bottemanne	4
(France) Les Deux Arbres	86	(France) Jacques Nicolet	1–2
(France) Les Deux Arbres	86	(United States) Ryan Shehan	5
(France) Les Deux Arbres	86	(Denmark) August Therbo	6
(France) Les Deux Arbres	86	(Belgium) Sita Vanmeert	1, 3–6
(France) Les Deux Arbres	87	(Belgium) Sita Vanmeert	2
(France) Les Deux Arbres	87	(France) Pierre-Olivier Calendini	3
(France) Les Deux Arbres	87	(France) Gil Maillet	3
(France) M Racing	53	(France) Cindy Gudet	1–3, 5–6
(France) M Racing	53	(Uruguay) Tomás Granzella	4
(France) M Racing	69	(Argentina) Gianfranco Barbara	2
(France) M Racing	69	(Uruguay) Tomás Granzella	2
(France) M Racing	69	(France) Natan Bihel	3
(Italy) Iron Dames by M Racing	85	(Spain) Marta García	4, 6
(Italy) Iron Dames by M Racing	85	(Spain) Natalia Granada	5
(Italy) Iron Lynx by LR Motorsport	60	(Italy) Gregorio Bertocco	1–5
(Italy) Iron Lynx by LR Motorsport	60	(Italy) Matteo Pianezzola	1–5
(France) ZOSH Competition	72	(France) Anthony Perrin	3
(France) ZOSH Competition	72	(France) Léo Pinquier	3
(France) AGS Events	89	(France) Clément Mateu	3
Entry lists:

== Results ==
Round		Circuit	JS P4 Winners	JS2 R Winning Team	Report
1	R1	(Spain) Circuit de Barcelona–Catalunya	(Poland) No. 1 Team Virage (Note: The No. 7 Inter Europol Competition car of Romain Favre won the race on track, but was handed a 36-second time penalty for not complying with the minimum pit-stop time. The No. 1 Team Virage car of Chance and Micouris inherited the win.)	(France) No. 50 Les Deux Arbres	
1	R1	(Spain) Circuit de Barcelona–Catalunya	(United Kingdom) Haydn Chance (United Kingdom) Theo Micouris	(France) Noé Da Cuhna (France) Antoine Lepesqueux	
1	R2	(Spain) Circuit de Barcelona–Catalunya	(Poland) No. 1 Team Virage	(France) No. 18 Pegasus Racing	
1	R2	(Spain) Circuit de Barcelona–Catalunya	(United Kingdom) Haydn Chance (United Kingdom) Theo Micouris	(France) Louis Stern	
2	R1	(France) Circuit Paul Ricard	(Poland) No. 7 Inter Europol Competition	(France) No. 31 ANS Motorsport	
2	R1	(France) Circuit Paul Ricard	(France) Romain Favre	(France) Clément Moreno	
2	R2	(France) Circuit Paul Ricard	(Poland) No. 1 Team Virage	(France) No. 31 ANS Motorsport	
2	R2	(France) Circuit Paul Ricard	(United Kingdom) Haydn Chance (United Kingdom) Theo Micouris	(France) Clément Moreno	
3	R	(France) Circuit de la Sarthe	(Poland) No. 66 Team Virage	(France) No. 69 M Racing	
3	R	(France) Circuit de la Sarthe	(Colombia) Jerónimo Berrío (Colombia) Pedro Juan Moreno	(France) Natan Bihel	
4	R1	(Belgium) Circuit de Spa–Francorchamps	(United Kingdom) No. 77 RLR MSport	(France) No. 31 ANS Motorsport	
4	R1	(Belgium) Circuit de Spa–Francorchamps	(Mexico) Ian Aguilera	(France) Clément Moreno	
4	R2	(Belgium) Circuit de Spa–Francorchamps	(France) No. 6 ANS Motorsport	(Italy) No. 85 Iron Dames by M Racing	
4	R2	(Belgium) Circuit de Spa–Francorchamps	(France) Iko Segret	(Spain) Marta García	
5	R1	(Italy) Mugello Circuit	(United Kingdom) No. 77 RLR MSport	(Italy) No. 60 Iron Lynx by LR Motorsport	
5	R1	(Italy) Mugello Circuit	(Mexico) Ian Aguilera	(Italy) Gregorio Bertocco (Italy) Matteo Pianezzola	
5	R2	(Italy) Mugello Circuit	(Poland) No. 66 Team Virage	(France) No. 29 Pegasus Racing	
5	R2	(Italy) Mugello Circuit	(Colombia) Jerónimo Berrío (Colombia) Pedro Juan Moreno	(France) Julien Schell (France) David Caussanel	
6	R1	(Portugal) Algarve International Circuit	(United Kingdom) No. 77 RLR MSport	(France) No. 50 Les Deux Arbres	
6	R1	(Portugal) Algarve International Circuit	(Mexico) Ian Aguilera	(France) Noé Da Cuhna (France) Antoine Lepesqueux	
6	R2	(Portugal) Algarve International Circuit	(Poland) No. 66 Team Virage	(Italy) No. 85 Iron Dames by M Racing	
6	R2	(Portugal) Algarve International Circuit	(Colombia) Jerónimo Berrío (Colombia) Pedro Juan Moreno	(Spain) Marta García	

== Championship standings ==
=== JS P4 Class ===
Pos.	Driver	Team	CAT (Spain)		LEC (France)		LMS (France)	SPA (Belgium)		MUG (Italy)		POR (Portugal)		Points
1	(United Kingdom) Haydn Chance (United Kingdom) Theo Micouris	(Poland) Team Virage	1	1	3	1	4	6	2	2	2	2	2	200
2	(Mexico) Ian Aguilera	(United Kingdom) RLR MSport	4	3	5	4	5	1	3	1	3	1	3	179
3	(France) Iko Segret	(France) ANS Motorsport	5	4	2	2	2	4	1	3	7	3	4	163
4	(Colombia) Jerónimo Berrío (Colombia) Pedro Juan Moreno	(Poland) Team Virage	2	Ret	6	Ret	1	2	8	4	1	5	1	147
5	(United Kingdom) Ben Caisley	(United Kingdom) Nielsen Racing	7	7	4	5	7	11	4	6	4	6	6	90
6	(France) Romain Favre	(Poland) Inter Europol Competition	9	5	1	Ret	3	3	5	WD	WD			77
7	(Taiwan) Chun-Ting Chou (Australia) James Winslow	(Italy) Monza Garage	3	Ret	8	3	Ret	5	Ret	5	Ret	7	8	66
8	(United Kingdom) Logan Hannah	(United Kingdom) Nielsen Racing	7	7	4	5								34
9	(Switzerland) Umberto D'Amato	(Poland) Team Virage			10	8	8	Ret	6	8	6			33
10	(Romania) Alin Fulga	(Romania) Smart Driving	6	Ret	7	6				9	9			30
11	(Portugal) André Vieira	(Spain) ASM Motorsport	8	6			12	9	Ret	12	10	9	9	30
12	(Switzerland) Jacopo D'Amato	(Poland) Team Virage					8	Ret	6	8	6			28
13	(Denmark) Mikkel Gaarde Pedersen (Republic of Ireland) Brandon McCaughan	(Poland) Team Virage										4	5	22
14	(Australia) Dylan Young	(Romania) Smart Driving	6	Ret	7	6								22
15	(Japan) Yuki Tanaka	(France) Pegasus Racing	DNS	DNS	9	7	11	10	9			Ret	11	20
16	(United Arab Emirates) Alim Geshev (Colombia) Lucas Medina	(Poland) Team Virage	10	2										19
17	(Italy) Giacomo Pollini (Italy) Simone Riccitelli	(Romania) Smart Driving					6							8
18	(France) Jordan Meyer	(France) Pegasus Racing								11	8			8
19	(Japan) Ryuichiro Ohtsuka	(France) Pegasus Racing						10	9					8
20	(Qatar) Paschalis Paris Stavrakidis	(Poland) Team Virage			10	8								5
21	(Japan) Tadao Uematsu	(France) Pegasus Racing										Ret	11	2
–	(United Kingdom) Thomas Jack Lee	(United Kingdom) Jolt Racing			DNS	DNS								–
Drivers ineligible to score points
	(Italy) Manuel Quondamcarlo	(Italy) LR Motorsport								7	5	8	7	
	(Switzerland) Jacopo Mazza	(Italy) LR Motorsport								7	5			
	(United Kingdom) Jeremy Ferguson	(United Kingdom) P4 Racing						7	7					
	(Italy) Jody Simone Vullo	(Italy) LR Motorsport										8	7	
	(France) Jacques Nicolet	(France) Les Deux Arbres					9	8	10	10	11	10	10	
	(United Kingdom) Andrew Ferguson	(United Kingdom) P4 Racing					10							
	(Austria) Michael Doppelmayr (Germany) Pierre Kaffer	(Italy) LR Motorsport					13							
Pos.	Driver	Team	CAT (Spain)		LEC (France)		LMS (France)	SPA (Belgium)		MUG (Italy)		POR (Portugal)		Points

=== JS2 R Class ===
Pos.	Driver	Team	CAT (Spain)		LEC (France)		LMS (France)	SPA (Belgium)		MUG (Italy)		POR (Portugal)		Points
1	(France) Julien Schell (France) David Caussanel	(France) Pegasus Racing	2	5	3	3	3	3	2	2	1	6	7	182
2	(France) Noé Da Cuhna (France) Antoine Lepesqueux	(France) Les Deux Arbres	1	3	7	6	8	7	6	3	2	1	2	167
3	(France) Clément Moreno	(France) ANS Motorsport	Ret	2	1	1	5	1	4	6	6			139
4	(France) Louis Stern	(France) Pegasus Racing	3	1	2	2	4	8	7	5	4	Ret	Ret	130
5	(France) Cindy Gudet	(France) M Racing	4	4	4	5	7			4	5	2	6	108
6	(Italy) Gregorio Bertocco (Italy) Matteo Pianezzola	(Italy) Iron Lynx by LR Motorsport	Ret	7	6	4	Ret	6	Ret	1	3	4	5	102
7	(Belgium) Sita Vanmeert	(France) Les Deux Arbres	5	6	Ret	Ret	9	4	5	Ret	7	3	4	86
8	(Uruguay) Tomás Granzella	(France) M Racing			Ret	7		2	3					36
9	(Denmark) August Therbo	(France) Les Deux Arbres										3	4	30
10	(France) Paul Trojani	(France) ANS Motorsport										5	3	28
11	(France) Sacha Bottemanne	(France) Les Deux Arbres						4	5					24
12	(France) Gwenaël Delomier	(France) Pegasus Racing								5	4			22
13	(France) Jacques Nicolet	(France) Les Deux Arbres	5	6	5	8								18
14	(United States) Ryan Shehan	(France) Les Deux Arbres								Ret	7			6
Drivers ineligible to score points
	(Spain) Marta García	(Italy) Iron Dames by M Racing						5	1			7	1	
	(France) Natan Bihel	(France) M Racing					1							
	(France) Paul Lanchère	(France) Pegasus Racing			2	2								
	(France) Steven Palette (France) Léo Payen	(France) LADC Motorsport					2							
	(France) Hervé Tremblaye	(France) LADC Motorsport					6							
	(Argentina) Gianfranco Barbara	(France) M Racing			Ret	7								
	(Spain) Natalia Granada	(Italy) Iron Dames by M Racing								7	Ret			
	(France) Edouard Hery	(France) Loire Valley Racing					10							
	Jérôme France	(France) ANS Motorsport					11							
	(France) Anthony Perrin (France) Léo Pinquier	(France) ZOSH Competition					12							
	(Belgium) Didier Balcaen	(France) ANS Motorsport					13							
	(France) Sébastien Margot	(France) No Limit Racing					14							
	(France) Pierre-Olivier Calendini (France) Gil Maillet	(France) Les Deux Arbres					15							
	(France) Clément Loeul	(France) LADC Motorsport					DNS							
	(France) Clément Mateu	(France) AGS Events					Ret							
Pos.	Driver	Team	CAT (Spain)		LEC (France)		LMS (France)	SPA (Belgium)		MUG (Italy)		POR (Portugal)		Points
