= Pedro Juan Moreno =

Colombian racing driver (born 2007)

- Born: Pedro Juan Moreno Restrepo; 3 August 2007 (age 19); Medellín, Colombia
- Nationality: (Colombia) Colombian
- Categorisation: FIA Silver

Championship titles
- 2023: NACAM Formula 4 Championship

Pedro Juan Moreno Restrepo (born 3 August 2007) is a Colombian racing driver who currently competes in the European Endurance Prototype Cup for ANS Motorsport.

== Career ==
Moreno started karting at the age of five after being influenced by his father, Santiago Moreno, a former racing driver. Racing in karts until 2021, he most notably won the 2014 Rotax Max Challenge Colombia title. Moreno then made his car racing debut in 2021, racing in the TC 2000 Colombia series in the TC Class A category, taking a class win in his first season in cars. Moreno then continued in the series in 2022, a year in which he became the youngest winner of the 6 Hours of Bogotá, winning it in both the Prototype and Grand Touring classes. Also that year, Moreno made his single-seater debut for Ram Racing in the NACAM Formula 4 Championship. Racing in non-championship round at Autódromo Hermanos Rodríguez, Moreno took both poles and won all three races.

In 2023, Moreno returned to Ram Racing to compete in his first full season in the NACAM Formula 4 Championship. In the first round at Autódromo Hermanos Rodríguez, Moreno won the first two races but exited the round second in points after finishing seventh in race two. Moreno then regained the points lead after winning race three at Querétaro, before winning all six races across the two rounds at Autódromo Hermanos Rodríguez, and ending his eight-race win streak in the second Querétaro round in September. In the following round at Puebla, he finished on the podium in all three races, including a win in race two, to clinch the title with a round to spare ahead of Cristian Cantú. At the end of the year, Moreno took part in the Ferrari Driver Academy scouting world finals.

Moreno then switched to sports car racing the following year, racing for Team Virage in the JS P4 class of the Ligier European Series. After taking two poles in the first two rounds and scoring a second place finish on his debut at Barcelona, Moreno took his maiden series win at Le Mans. In the remaining three rounds, Moreno won at Mugello and Algarve en route to a fourth place points finish at season's end. At the end of 2024, Moreno partook in the European Le Mans Series post-season tests, in which he tested LMP3 machinery for Team Virage.

After sitting most of 2025 on the sidelines, Moreno returned to racing in September of that year, competing in the 992 Endurance Cup for HRT Performance, finishing fourth overall and third in the Pro class in the 12 hour endurance. Moreno then joined Bretton Racing to make his LMP3 debut at the Silverstone round of the Michelin Le Mans Cup, in which he retired due to a technical issue.

Continuing in endurance prototype racing for 2026, Moreno joined ANS Motorsport to race in the European Endurance Prototype Cup.

== Karting record ==
=== Karting career summary ===
Season	Series	Team	Position
2017	Rotax Max Challenge Colombia – Micro Max		10th

== Racing record ==
=== Racing career summary ===
Season	Series	Team	Races	Wins	Poles	F/Laps	Podiums	Points	Position
2022	TC Junior Colombia								
2022	NACAM Formula 4 Championship	Ram Racing	3	3	2	0	3	0	NC†
2023	NACAM Formula 4 Championship	Ram Racing	18	11	7	14	15	315	**1st**
2024	Ligier European Series – JS P4	Team Virage	11	3	3	1	5	147	4th
2025	992 Endurance Cup	HRT Performance	1	0	0	0	0	—N/a	4th
2025	Le Mans Cup – LMP3	Bretton Racing	1	0	0	0	0	0	NC
2026	European Endurance Prototype Cup	ANS Motorsport							

^{†} As Moreno was a guest driver, he was ineligible to score points.

=== Complete NACAM Formula 4 Championship results ===
(key) (Races in bold indicate pole position; races in italics indicate fastest lap)

Year	Team	1	2	3	4	5	6	7	8	9	10	11	12	13	14	15	16	17	18	19	20	DC	Points
2022	Ram Racing	QUE; 1	QUE; 2	QUE; 3	AHR1; 1	AHR1; 2	AHR1; 3	PUE; 1	PUE; 2	PUE; 3	AHR2; 1	AHR2; 2	AHR2; 3	AHR3; 1	AHR3; 2	AHR3; 3	AHR4; 1	AHR4; 2	**AHR5**; **1**; 1	**AHR5**; **2**; 1	AHR5; 3; 1	NC†	0
2023	Ram Racing	**AHR1**; **1**; 1	AHR1; 2; 1	**AHR1**; **3**; 7	QUE1; 1; 7	QUE1; 2; 2	QUE1; 3; 1	**AHR2**; **1**; 1	AHR2; 2; 1	**AHR2**; **3**; 1	**AHR3**; **1**; 1	AHR3; 2; 1	AHR3; 3; 1	QUE2; 1; 1	QUE2; 2; 6	QUE2; 3; 2	**PUE**; **1**; 2	PUE; 2; 1	**PUE**; **3**; 3	AHR4; 1	AHR4; 2	1st	315

^{†} As Moreno was a guest driver, he was ineligible to score points.

=== Complete Ligier European Series results ===
(key) (Races in bold indicate pole position; results in italics indicate fastest lap)

Year	Entrant	Class	Chassis	1	2	3	4	5	6	7	8	9	10	11	Rank	Points
2024	Team Virage	JS P4	Ligier JS P4	**CAT**; **1**; 2	CAT; 2 Ret	LEC; 1; 6	**LEC**; **2** Ret	LMS; 1	SPA; 1; 2	**SPA**; **2**; 8	MUG; 1; 4	MUG; 2; 1	ALG; 1; 5	ALG; 2; 1	4th	147

=== Complete Le Mans Cup results ===
(key) (Races in bold indicate pole position; results in italics indicate fastest lap)

Year	Entrant	Class	Chassis	1	2	3	4	5	6	7	Rank	Points
2025	Bretton Racing	LMP3	Ligier JS P325	CAT	LEC	LMS; 1	LMS; 2	SPA	SIL; Ret	ALG	NC	0

^{*} Season still in progress.
