= Kaylee Bryson =

American racing driver

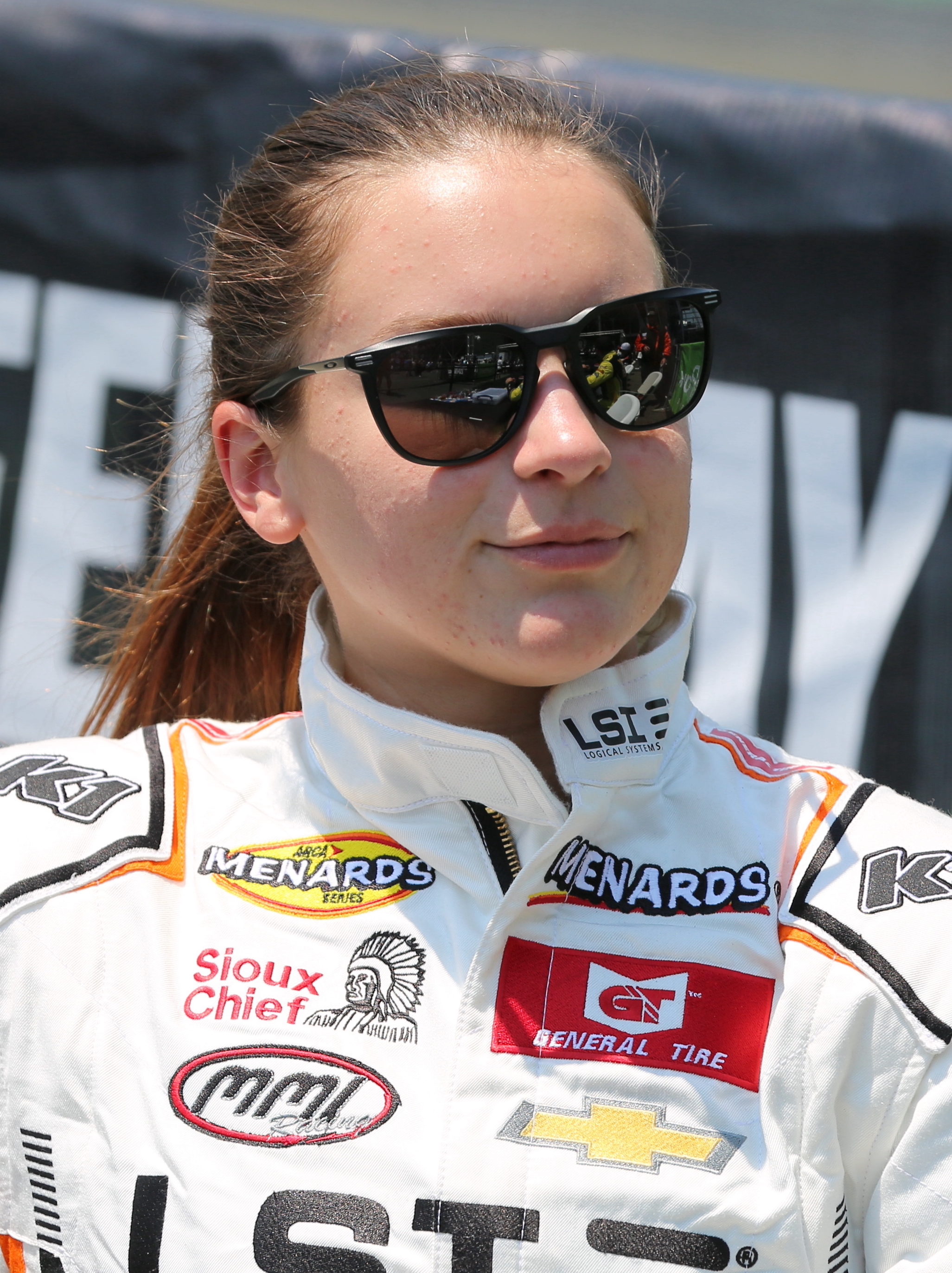
- Bryson at Sonoma Raceway in 2025
- Born: March 11, 2001 (age 25); Muskogee, Oklahoma, U.S.
- Achievements: First female driver to win a USAC National Series event (Belleville, 2024, Silver Crown); 2025 SCCA Trans-Am Series XGT Champion; 2024 SCCA Trans-Am Series SGT Champion; 2015 Tulsa Shootout Restricted A-Class Winner
- Awards: 2023 USAC Silver Crown Series Rookie of the Year

ARCA Menards Series career
- 1 race run over 1 year
- Best finish: 97th (2025)
- First race: 2025 Badger 200 (Madison)
Wins	Top tens	Poles
0	1	0

ARCA Menards Series West career
- 2 races run over 1 year
- Best finish: 38th (2025)
- First race: 2025 General Tire 200 (Sonoma)
- Last race: 2025 Desert Diamond Casino West Valley 100 (Phoenix)
Wins	Top tens	Poles
0	0	0

Trans-Am Series (SGT Class) career
- Debut season: 2023
- Current team: Sam Pierce Racing
- Car number: 02
- Starts: 12
- Championships: 1
- Wins: 3
- Best finish: 1st in 2024

Championship titles
- 2025 2024: XGT Class Champion; SGT Class Champion

USAC Silver Crown Series career
- Debut season: 2022
- Current team: Sam Pierce Racing
- Car number: 26
- Starts: 31
- Wins: 1
- Best finish: 5th in 2023
- Finished last season: 7th

Awards
- 2023: Rookie of the Year
- Statistics up to date as of November 2, 2025.

Kaylee Rae Bryson (born March 11, 2001) is an American racing driver. She competes full-time for Sam Pierce Racing in both the Trans-Am Series and USAC Silver Crown Series, driving the Nos. 02 and 26 Chevrolets respectively. She also previously competed part-time in the ARCA Menards Series and ARCA Menards Series West, driving the No. 17 Chevrolet for Cook Racing Technologies.

Bryson is best known for being the first female driver to advance to the A-Main feature race at the Chili Bowl Nationals, as well as the first woman to win a USAC National Series feature race. In 2024, Bryson won the Trans-Am SGT class championship, becoming the second female driver to win the series title in SGT.

== Racing career ==
Bryson's racing career began at age nine, competing in go-karts at 3D Raceway in Oklahoma. In 2015, she won the Tulsa Shootout's Restricted A class, becoming the second female driver to win a Golden Driller trophy.

=== USAC ===
Bryson made her first attempt in the USAC National Midget Championship with Dave Mac Motorsports in 2019. She then signed with Keith Kunz Motorsports (KKM) in 2020, driving with sponsorship from JBL and backing from Toyota Racing Development (TRD). Bryson advanced to the main event in 22 of her 23 season starts, finishing eleventh in the standings and leading Racer's Robin Miller to call her "the best shot at a woman dirt racer ever making it to the big time."

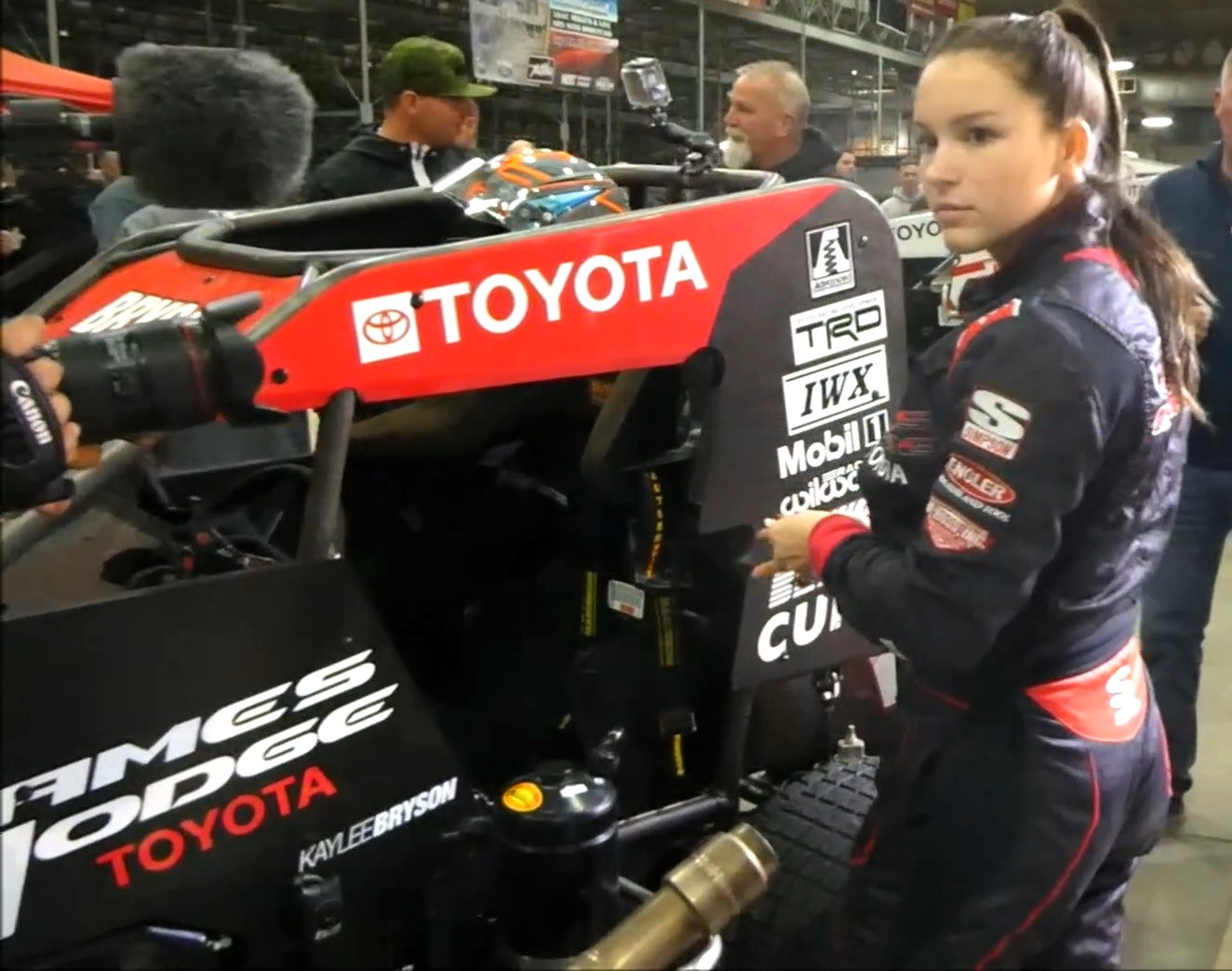
Bryson with her car at the 2022 Chili Bowl

In 2021, Bryson became the first female driver to qualify on pole at the Turkey Night Grand Prix, leading the first seventeen laps and finishing fifth, the highest-ever finish for a woman in the event's history. Bryson spent a total of three seasons with KKM, the best of which came in 2022, where she picked up additional sponsorship from Yahoo! for eighteen races. Bryson finished seventh in USAC National Midget points and was named the series' Most Improved Driver. Bryson also made headlines at the 2022 Chili Bowl Nationals by winning her B-Main feature race, making her the first female driver to advance to the A-Main, where she finished eighteenth.

Bryson made her USAC Silver Crown Series debut with Sam Pierce Racing (SPR) on June 18, 2022. On December 8, 2022, she signed with SPR to compete full-time in Silver Crown in 2023. Bryson's final start with KKM came at the 2023 Chili Bowl Nationals, where she again advanced to the A-Main feature and finished 22nd, after which she departed from the TRD program. Bryson later admitted that Toyota "didn't have enough to offer me and I really wanted to do something more with my career than midgets and late models...I thought going my own route would be better in the long run." She ultimately finished fifth in the USAC Silver Crown standings for SPR, becoming the first female driver to earn Rookie of the Year honors in series history.

In 2024, Bryson returned to the Chili Bowl with Sammy Swindell's team, Swindell-Bertrand Motorsports. Her preliminary result forced her to start from an F-Main race, leaving her unable to advance farther than the E-Main. Bryson then returned to Sam Pierce Racing for another full Silver Crown season. On May 18, she won her first Silver Crown race at the Belleville High Banks from pole position, making her both the first woman to qualify on pole and win a USAC National Series feature race.

=== Trans-Am ===
Bryson made her Trans-Am Series debut in the 2023 season-opening race at Sebring. In 2024, she began competing full-time in the series' SGT class to gain road course experience before pursuing opportunities in IndyCar or NASCAR. In her fourth career series start, Bryson won her first race on April 14, 2024, at NOLA Motorsports Park, leading every lap from pole position and winning with a 29-second margin of victory. She then earned a second class win at Canadian Tire Motorsport Park on August 31. With Bryson's third win at Virginia International Raceway in October, she clinched the series championship in the SGT class, becoming the second female driver in history to do so and third overall to win a Trans-Am title of any kind.

In 2025, Bryson moved up to Trans-Am's XGT class. She earned her first class win at Mid-Ohio Sports Car Course on June 21 despite battling a cam sensor issue throughout the race, giving her the championship standings lead over veteran driver Paul Tracy. Bryson clinched the XGT championship at the season's penultimate race at Barber Motorsports Park and became the first female driver to win Trans-Am championships in two different classes.

=== ARCA ===
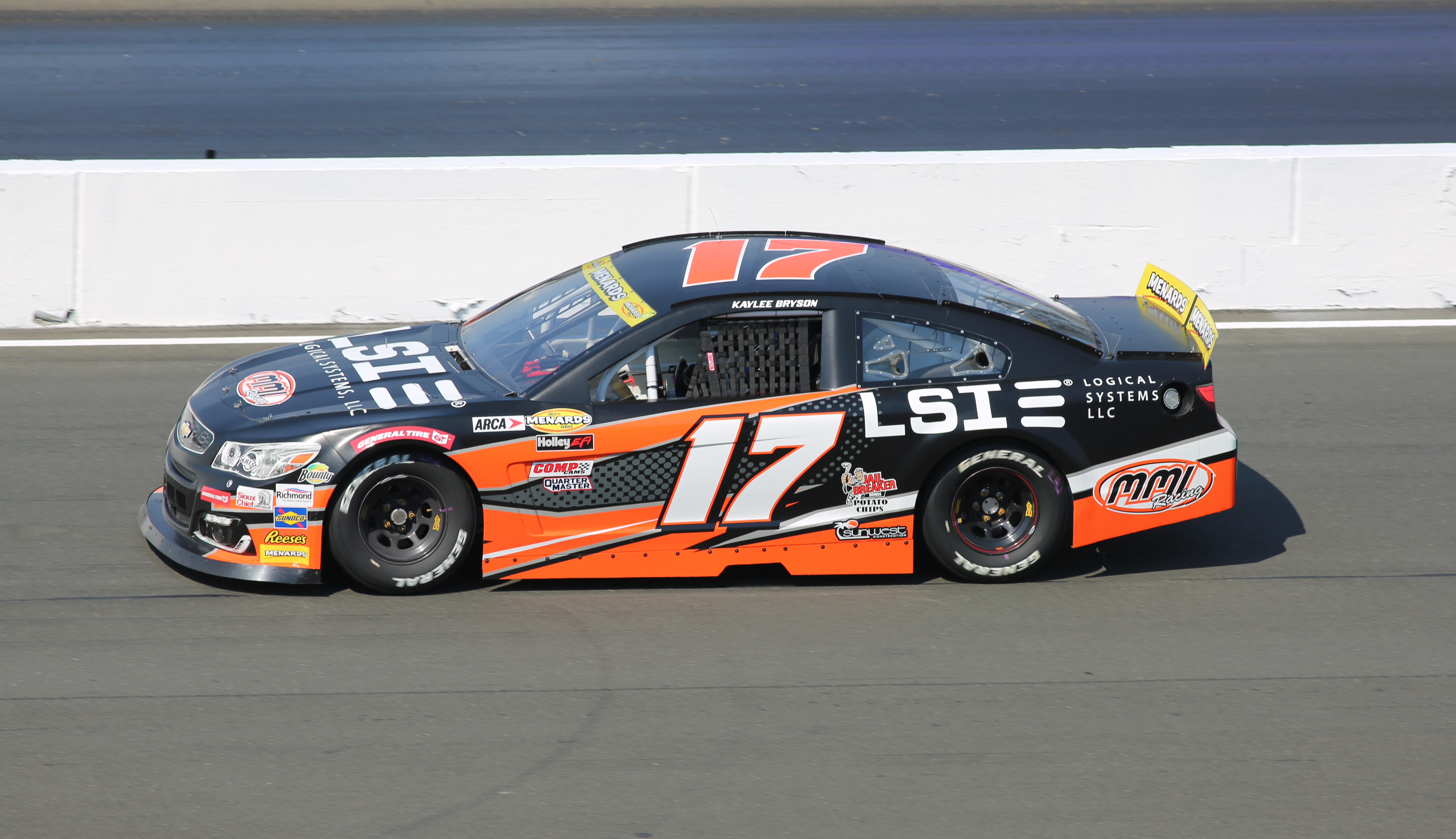
Bryson's No. 17 car at Sonoma Raceway in 2025

In 2025, Bryson made her stock car racing debut in the ARCA Menards Series West race at Sonoma Raceway, driving the No. 17 Chevrolet for Cook Racing Technologies. Bryson finished fourteenth after battling electrical issues throughout the event. In August, she made her national stock car debut in the ARCA Menards Series at Madison International Speedway, where she finished in eighth place.

== Motorsports career results ==
=== ARCA Menards Series ===
(key) (Bold – Pole position awarded by qualifying time. Italics – Pole position earned by points standings or practice time. * – Most laps led.)

ARCA Menards Series results
Year	Team	No.	Make	1	2	3	4	5	6	7	8	9	10	11	12	13	14	15	16	17	18	19	20	AMSC	Pts	Ref
2025	Cook Racing Technologies	17	Chevy	DAY	PHO	TAL	KAN	CLT	MCH	BLN	ELK	LRP	DOV	IRP	IOW	GLN	ISF	MAD; 8	DSF	BRI	SLM	KAN	TOL	97th	36	

==== ARCA Menards Series West ====
ARCA Menards Series West results
Year	Team	No.	Make	1	2	3	4	5	6	7	8	9	10	11	12	AMSWC	Pts	Ref
2025	Cook Racing Technologies	17	Chevy	KER	PHO	TUC	CNS	KER	SON; 14	TRI	PIR	AAS	MAD	LVS	PHO; 18	38th	56	
