= Jaiden Reyna =

Mexican-American racing driver (born 2006)

- Reyna's No. 54 Late Model at the Las Vegas Motor Speedway Bullring in 2026
- Born: September 7, 2006 (age 20); Yorktown, Virginia, U.S.

ARCA Menards Series career
- 1 race run over 1 year
- Best finish: 102nd (2026)
- First race: 2026 General Tire 150 (Phoenix)
Wins	Top tens	Poles
0	0	0

ARCA Menards Series West career
- 2 races run over 1 year
- Best finish: 34th (2026)
- First race: 2026 Oil Workers 150 presented by the West Coast Stock Car Motorsports Hall of Fame (Bakersfield)
- Last race: 2026 General Tire 150 (Phoenix)
Wins	Top tens	Poles
0	0	0
- Statistics up to date as of November 2, 2026.

Jaiden Reyna (born September 7, 2006) is a Mexican-American professional stock car racing driver. He last competed part-time in the ARCA Menards Series West, driving the No. 42 Chevrolet for Cook Racing Technologies.

== Racing career ==
Reyna began his career at the age of six, where he competed at where he joined and competed with the Hampton Road Kart Club at Langley Speedway. Afterwards, he raced in Bandoleros, and later Legends Cars. He then went on to compete in various series such as the INEX Summer Shootout, where he won the championship in the Young Lions division in 2020, the Southeast Legends Tour, and the CARS Tour. He was also a former development driver for Rev Racing and the teams Drive for Diversity program.

In 2026, it was revealed that Reyna will make his debut in the ARCA Menards Series West at Kevin Harvick's Kern Raceway, driving the No. 42 Chevrolet for Cook Racing Technologies.

== Personal life ==
Reyna's family originated in Mexico, with his grandmother on his father's side coming to United States in 1968 before becoming a naturalized citizen in 1983.

Reyna's father, Pedro, is a former member of the United States Army.

== Motorsports results ==
=== ARCA Menards Series ===
(key) (Bold – Pole position awarded by qualifying time. Italics – Pole position earned by points standings or practice time. * – Most laps led. ** – All laps led.)

ARCA Menards Series results
Year	Team	No.	Make	1	2	3	4	5	6	7	8	9	10	11	12	13	14	15	16	17	18	19	20	AMSC	Pts	Ref
2026	Cook Racing Technologies	42	Chevy	DAY	PHO; 14	KAN	TAL	GLN	TOL	MCH	POC	BER	ELK	CHI	LRP	IRP	IOW	ISF	MAD	DSF	SLM	BRI	KAN	102nd	30	

==== ARCA Menards Series West ====
ARCA Menards Series West results
Year	Team	No.	Make	1	2	3	4	5	6	7	8	9	10	11	12	13	AMSWC	Pts	Ref
2026	Cook Racing Technologies	42	Chevy	KER; 13	PHO; 14	TUC	SHA	CNS	TRI	SON	PIR	AAS	MAD	LVS	PHO	KER	34th	61	

=== CARS Late Model Stock Car Tour ===
(key) (Bold – Pole position awarded by qualifying time. Italics – Pole position earned by points standings or practice time. * – Most laps led. ** – All laps led.)

CARS Late Model Stock Car Tour results
Year	Team	No.	Make	1	2	3	4	5	6	7	8	9	10	11	12	13	14	15	CLMSCTC	Pts	Ref
2022	N/A	5R	Chevy	CRW	HCY	GRE	AAS	FCS	LGY	DOM	HCY	ACE	MMS	NWS	TCM	ACE	SBO; 31	CRW	78th	5	
