= 1998 in motorsport =

The following is an overview of the events of 1998 in motorsport including the major racing events, motorsport venues that were opened and closed during a year, championships and non-championship events that were established and disestablished in a year, and births and deaths of racing drivers and other motorsport people.

== Annual events ==
The calendar includes only annual major non-championship events or annual events that had significance separate from the championship. For the dates of the championship events see related season articles.

Date	Event	Ref
1–18 January	20th Dakar Rally	
31 January-1 February	36th 24 Hours of Daytona	
15 February	40th Daytona 500	
24 May	56th Monaco Grand Prix	
24 May	82nd Indianapolis 500	
30 May-12 June	81st Isle of Man TT	
6–7 June	66th 24 Hours of Le Mans	
13–14 June	26th 24 Hours of Nurburgring	
4–5 July	50th 24 Hours of Spa	
26 July	21st Suzuka 8 Hours	
9 August	8th Masters of Formula 3	
4 October	40th AMP Bathurst 1000	
15 November	41st FAI 1000	
22 November	45th Macau Grand Prix	
5–6 December	11th Race of Champions	

== Births ==
Date	Month	Name	Nationality	Occupation	Note	Ref
20	May	Jamie Chadwick	British	Racing driver		
29	October	Lance Stroll	Canadian	Racing driver		

== Deaths ==
Date	Month	Name	Age	Nationality	Occupation	Note	Ref
12	January	Roger Clark	58	British	Rally driver	1976 Lombard RAC Rally winner.	
2	October	Olivier Gendebien	74	Belgian	Racing driver	24 Hours of Le Mans winner (1958, 1960-1962).	

== See also ==
- List of 1998 motorsport champions
