= 2026 Oil Workers 150 =

ARCA Menards Series West race at Kevin Harvick's Kern Raceway

2026 Oil Workers 150 presented by the West Coast Stock Car Motorsports Hall of Fame
Race details
- Race 1 of 13 in the 2026 ARCA Menards Series West
- Date: February 28, 2026
- Location: Kevin Harvick's Kern Raceway in Bakersfield, California
- Course: Permanent racing facility
- Course length: 0.500 miles (0.805 km)
- Distance: 167 laps, 83.5 mi (134.38 km)
- Scheduled distance: 150 laps, 75 mi (120.701 km)
- Average speed: 59.162 miles per hour (95.212 km/h)

Pole position
Driver	Jade Avedisian	Nitro Motorsports
- Time: 18.686

Most laps led
Driver	Sean Hingorani	Central Coast Racing
- Laps: 136

Fastest lap
Driver	Sean Hingorani	Central Coast Racing
- Time: 19.301

Winner
No. 19	Mason Massey	Bill McAnally Racing

Television in the United States
- Network: FloRacing
- Announcers: Charles Krall

Radio in the United States
- Radio: ARN

The 2026 Oil Workers 150 presented by the West Coast Stock Car Motorsports Hall of Fame was an ARCA Menards Series West race held on Saturday, February 28, 2026, at Kevin Harvick's Kern Raceway in Bakersfield, California. Contested over 167 laps—extended from 150 laps due to a double overtime finish on the 0.500 miles (0.805 km) short track, it was first race of the 2026 ARCA Menards Series West season, and the tenth running of the event.

Mason Massey, driving for Bill McAnally Racing, took over the lead in the late stages over a dominating Sean Hingorani, and led the final 31 laps while surviving two overtime restarts to earn his first career ARCA Menards Series West win in his first career start. Hingorani led a race-high 136 laps from second position before falling to fifth on the final restart. Eric Nascimento finished second, and Taylor Mayhew finished third. Trevor Huddleston and Hingorani rounded out the top five, while Hailie Deegan, Joey Iest, Jade Avedisian, Gavin Ray, and Cole Denton rounded out the top ten.

== Report ==
=== Background ===
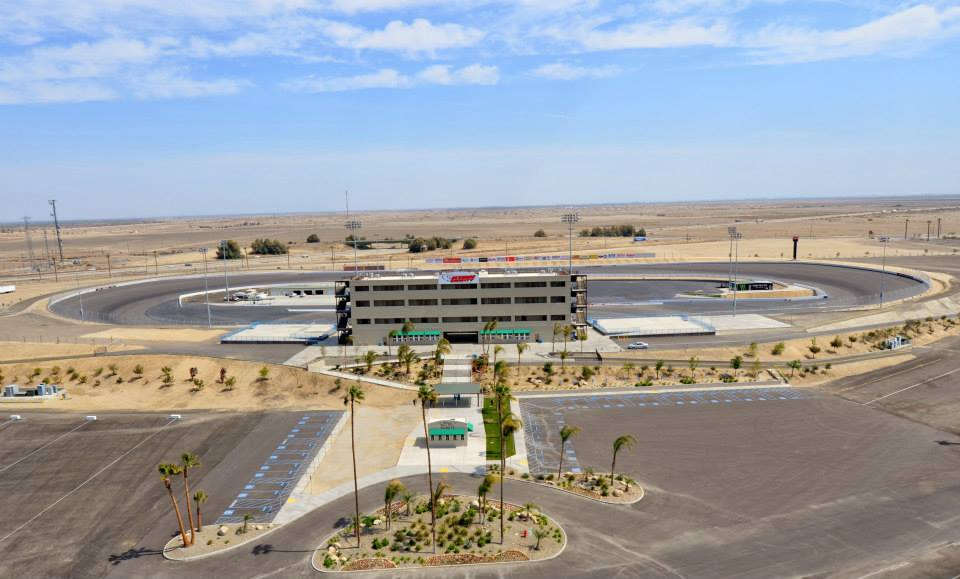
Kevin Harvick's Kern Raceway, the track where the race was held.

Kevin Harvick's Kern Raceway (formerly Kern County Raceway Park) is a 0.5-mile (0.80 km) oval speedway located on CA 43 (Enos Lane) just off Interstate 5 in Bakersfield, Kern County, California, United States. Opened in 2013, it was built as a replacement for Mesa Marin Raceway.

Kevin Harvick's Kern Raceway hosts events with NASCAR's Whelen All-American Series along with an ARCA Menards Series West race since 2013.

The track has banks of 8° in the straightaways, with 14° paved corners. The track has 15,000 seats for fans, and room to expand to 17,000 seats for various events. It also contains 21 suites in the grandstand along with 18 concession stands.

==== Entry list ====
- (R) denotes rookie driver.

#	Driver	Team	Make
00	Toby Blanton	Jet Daddy Racing	Chevrolet
1	Robbie Kennealy	Jan's Towing Racing	Ford
4	Eric Nascimento	Nascimento Motorsports	Chevrolet
05	David Smith	Shockwave Motorsports	Toyota
5	Eric Johnson Jr.	Jerry Pitts Racing	Toyota
7	Gavin Ray (R)	Jerry Pitts Racing	Toyota
13	Sean Hingorani	Central Coast Racing	Toyota
15	Mia Lovell (R)	Nitro Motorsports	Toyota
16	Hailie Deegan	Bill McAnally Racing	Chevrolet
17	Taylor Mayhew	Cook Racing Technologies	Toyota
19	Mason Massey	Bill McAnally Racing	Chevrolet
25	Julian DaCosta (R)	Nitro Motorsports	Toyota
42	Jaiden Reyna	Cook Racing Technologies	Chevrolet
50	Trevor Huddleston	High Point Racing	Ford
51	Austin Varco	Strike Mamba Racing	Chevrolet
55	Andrew Chapman (R)	High Point Racing	Ford
66	Eric Rhead	66 Rhead Racing	Chevrolet
70	Jade Avedisian (R)	Nitro Motorsports	Toyota
71	Cole Denton (R)	Jan's Towing Racing	Ford
72	Cody Dennison	Strike Mamba Racing	Chevrolet
77	Alonso Salinas	Performance P-1 Motorsports	Toyota
88	Joey Iest	Naake-Klauer Motorsports	Ford
Official entry list

== Practice ==
The first and only practice session was held on Saturday, February 28, at 1:00 PM PST, and lasted for 45 minutes.

Mason Massey, driving for Bill McAnally Racing, set the fastest time in the session, with a lap of 18.765 seconds, and a speed of 95.923 miles per hour (154.373 km/h).

=== Practice results ===
Pos.	#	Driver	Team	Make	Time	Speed
1	19	Mason Massey	Bill McAnally Racing	Chevrolet	18.765	95.923
2	1	Robbie Kennealy	Jan's Towing Racing	Ford	18.844	95.521
3	16	Hailie Deegan	Bill McAnally Racing	Chevrolet	18.869	95.395
Full practice results

== Qualifying ==
Qualifying was held on Saturday, February 28, at 3:00 PM PST. The qualifying procedure used was a multi-car, multi-lap based system. All drivers were on track for a 20-minute timed session, and whoever set the fastest time in that session won the pole.

Jade Avedisian, driving for Nitro Motorsports, qualified on pole position with a lap of 18.686 seconds, and a speed of 96.329 miles per hour (155.026 km/h).

=== Qualifying results ===
Pos.	#	Driver	Team	Make	Time	Speed
1	70	Jade Avedisian (R)	Nitro Motorsports	Toyota	18.686	96.329
2	13	Sean Hingorani	Central Coast Racing	Toyota	18.690	96.308
3	1	Robbie Kennealy	Jan's Towing Racing	Ford	18.722	96.144
4	19	Mason Massey	Bill McAnally Racing	Chevrolet	18.731	96.097
5	50	Trevor Huddleston	High Point Racing	Ford	18.760	95.949
6	16	Hailie Deegan	Bill McAnally Racing	Chevrolet	18.778	95.857
7	17	Taylor Mayhew	Cook Racing Technologies	Toyota	18.815	95.668
8	15	Mia Lovell (R)	Nitro Motorsports	Toyota	18.833	95.577
9	55	Andrew Chapman (R)	High Point Racing	Ford	18.892	95.278
10	88	Joey Iest	Naake-Klauer Motorsports	Ford	18.893	95.273
11	4	Eric Nascimento	Nascimento Motorsports	Chevrolet	18.932	95.077
12	5	Eric Johnson Jr.	Jerry Pitts Racing	Toyota	18.935	95.062
13	42	Jaiden Reyna	Cook Racing Technologies	Chevrolet	18.976	94.857
14	25	Julian DaCosta (R)	Nitro Motorsports	Toyota	19.010	94.687
15	7	Gavin Ray (R)	Jerry Pitts Racing	Toyota	19.028	94.597
16	71	Cole Denton (R)	Jan's Towing Racing	Ford	19.036	94.558
17	66	Eric Rhead	66 Rhead Racing	Chevrolet	19.576	91.949
18	72	Cody Dennison	Strike Mamba Racing	Chevrolet	19.648	91.612
19	51	Austin Varco	Strike Mamba Racing	Chevrolet	19.759	91.098
20	05	David Smith	Shockwave Motorsports	Toyota	19.819	90.822
21	77	Alonso Salinas	Performance P-1 Motorsports	Toyota	19.835	90.749
22	00	Toby Blanton	Jet Daddy Racing	Chevrolet	21.595	83.353
Official qualifying results

== Race ==
=== Race results ===
Laps: 167

Fin	St	#	Driver	Team	Make	Laps	Led	Status	Pts
1	4	19	Mason Massey	Bill McAnally Racing	Chevrolet	167	31	Running	47
2	11	4	Eric Nascimento	Nascimento Motorsports	Chevrolet	167	0	Running	42
3	7	17	Taylor Mayhew	Cook Racing Technologies	Toyota	167	0	Running	41
4	5	50	Trevor Huddleston	High Point Racing	Ford	167	0	Running	40
5	2	13	Sean Hingorani	Central Coast Racing	Toyota	167	136	Running	41
6	6	16	Hailie Deegan	Bill McAnally Racing	Chevrolet	167	0	Running	38
7	10	88	Joey Iest	Naake-Klauer Motorsports	Ford	167	0	Running	37
8	1	70	Jade Avedisian (R)	Nitro Motorsports	Toyota	167	0	Running	37
9	15	7	Gavin Ray (R)	Jerry Pitts Racing	Toyota	167	0	Running	35
10	16	71	Cole Denton (R)	Jan's Towing Racing	Ford	167	0	Running	34
11	12	5	Eric Johnson Jr.	Jerry Pitts Racing	Toyota	167	0	Running	33
12	8	15	Mia Lovell (R)	Nitro Motorsports	Toyota	167	0	Running	32
13	13	42	Jaiden Reyna	Cook Racing Technologies	Chevrolet	167	0	Running	31
14	18	72	Cody Dennison	Strike Mamba Racing	Chevrolet	167	0	Running	30
15	17	66	Eric Rhead	66 Rhead Racing	Chevrolet	167	0	Running	29
16	9	55	Andrew Chapman (R)	High Point Racing	Ford	167	0	Running	28
17	21	77	Alonso Salinas	Performance P-1 Motorsports	Toyota	167	0	Running	27
18	20	05	David Smith	Shockwave Motorsports	Toyota	159	0	Running	26
19	14	25	Julian DaCosta (R)	Nitro Motorsports	Toyota	148	0	Accident	25
20	3	1	Robbie Kennealy	Jan's Towing Racing	Ford	74	0	Transmission	24
21	22	00	Toby Blanton	Jet Daddy Racing	Chevrolet	71	0	Steering	23
22	19	51	Austin Varco	Strike Mamba Racing	Chevrolet	26	0	Transmission	22
Official race results

=== Race statistics ===
- Lead changes: 2 among 2 different drivers
- Cautions/Laps: 8 for 54 laps
- Red flags: 0
- Time of race: 1 hour, 24 minutes and 4 seconds
- Average speed: 59.162 miles per hour (95.212 km/h)

== Standings after the race ==
Drivers' Championship standings

Pos	Driver	Points
1	Mason Massey	47
2	Eric Nascimento	42 (–5)
3	Taylor Mayhew	41 (–6)
4	Sean Hingorani	41 (–6)
5	Trevor Huddleston	40 (–7)
6	Hailie Deegan	38 (–9)
7	Joey Iest	37 (–10)
8	Jade Avedisian	37 (–10)
9	Gavin Ray	35 (–12)
10	Cole Denton	34 (–13)

- Note: Only the first 10 positions are included for the driver standings.

Previous race: 2025 Desert Diamond Casino West Valley 100	ARCA Menards Series West; 2026 season	Next race: 2026 General Tire 150
