= 2022 NACAM Formula 4 Championship =

Auto racing series

The 2022 NACAM Formula 4 Championship season was the sixth season of the NACAM Formula 4 Championship. It began on 26 March at Autódromo de Quéretaro in El Marqués and ended on 30 October at Autódromo Hermanos Rodríguez in Mexico City with the additional, non-championship, round held on 9–10 December at the same circuit.

== Teams and drivers ==
All teams were Mexican-registered.

Team	No.	Driver	Rounds
Ram Racing	2	(Mexico) Arturo Flores	5–6 (Note: Arturo Flores did Round 5 with two different teams: R1 with SP Driver Academy and then R2 and R3 with Ram Racing.)
Ram Racing	8	(Mexico) Eduardo Alquicira	1
Ram Racing	12	(Mexico) Luis Carlos Pérez	All
Ram Racing	16	(Mexico) Alejandro Berumen	5
Ram Racing	33	(Colombia) Lucas Medina	6
Ram Racing	36	(Colombia) Pedro Juan Moreno	NC
Ram Racing	55	(Colombia) Juan Felipe Pedraza	All
SP Driver Academy	2	(Mexico) Arturo Flores	4–5
SP Driver Academy	21	(Mexico) Jesse Carrasquedo Jr.	4
RRK Motorsports	3	(Mexico) Emil Abed	1
RRK Motorsports	7	(Mexico) Manuel Roza	All
Richards Motorsports	4	(Mexico) Diego de la Torre	4–6, NC
Richards Motorsports	14	(Mexico) Dewey Richards	6, NC
Morelia F4 RT	5	(Mexico) Julián Díaz	5–6
Morelia F4 RT	9	(Mexico) Daniel Forcadell	5
Morelia F4 RT	10	(Mexico) Juan Contreras	5–6
Easy-Shop.com Racing	9	(Mexico) Daniel Forcadell	1, 3–4
RE Motorsport	11	(Mexico) Esteban Rodríguez	2–6
RE Motorsport	24	(Mexico) Joe Sandoval	1
RE Motorsport	88	(Mexico) Cristian Cantú	1, 3, 5–6
Santinel Racing Team	13	(Mexico) Oscar Alquicira	2–3
Santinel Racing Team	13	(Mexico) Marco Alquicira	3–6
Santinel Racing Team	44	(Mexico) Eduardo Alquicira	2–4, 6
ProRally Mothers	19	(Mexico) Rodrigo Rejón	1–2, 4–5
ProRally Mothers	19	(Mexico) Gerardo Rejón Jr.	3
ProRally Mothers	99	(Mexico) Julio Rejón	1–2, 4–5
ProRally Mothers	99	(Mexico) Gerardo Rejón Sr.	3

== Race calendar ==
All rounds were held in Mexico. The first five rounds were a part of the Copa Notiauto series roster, whereas the last round was held in the support of the 2022 Mexico City Grand Prix. The non-championship round staged after the season finale was confirmed later, and was held in the support of the Copa Notiauto's Endurance 24 race.

Round		Circuit	Date	Pole position	Fastest lap	Winning driver	Winning team
1	R1	Autódromo de Querétaro (El Marqués, Querétaro)	26 March	(Mexico) Manuel Roza	(Mexico) Manuel Roza	(Mexico) Julio Rejón	(Mexico) Mothers ProRally
1	R2	Autódromo de Querétaro (El Marqués, Querétaro)	27 March		(Mexico) Julio Rejón	(Colombia) Juan Felipe Pedraza	(Mexico) Ram Racing
1	R3	Autódromo de Querétaro (El Marqués, Querétaro)	27 March	(Mexico) Manuel Roza	(Mexico) Manuel Roza	(Mexico) Manuel Roza	(Mexico) RRK Motorsports
2	R1	Autódromo Hermanos Rodríguez (Vintage Circuit) (Mexico City)	21 May	(Mexico) Julio Rejón	(Mexico) Julio Rejón	(Mexico) Julio Rejón	(Mexico) Mothers ProRally
2	R2	Autódromo Hermanos Rodríguez (Vintage Circuit) (Mexico City)	22 May		(Mexico) Julio Rejón	(Mexico) Julio Rejón	(Mexico) Mothers ProRally
2	R3	Autódromo Hermanos Rodríguez (Vintage Circuit) (Mexico City)	22 May	(Mexico) Julio Rejón	(Colombia) Juan Felipe Pedraza	(Colombia) Juan Felipe Pedraza	(Mexico) Ram Racing
3	R1	Autódromo Miguel E. Abed (Short Int. Circuit) (Amozoc, Puebla)	26 June	(Colombia) Juan Felipe Pedraza	(Colombia) Juan Felipe Pedraza	(Colombia) Juan Felipe Pedraza	(Mexico) Ram Racing
3	R2	Autódromo Miguel E. Abed (Short Int. Circuit) (Amozoc, Puebla)	26 June		(Mexico) Cristian Cantú	(Colombia) Juan Felipe Pedraza	(Mexico) Ram Racing
3	R3	Autódromo Miguel E. Abed (Short Int. Circuit) (Amozoc, Puebla)	26 June	(Mexico) Cristian Cantú	(Colombia) Juan Felipe Pedraza	(Colombia) Juan Felipe Pedraza	(Mexico) Ram Racing
4	R1	Autódromo Hermanos Rodríguez (GP Circuit) (Mexico City)	19 August	(Colombia) Juan Felipe Pedraza	(Mexico) Jesse Carrasquedo Jr.	(Mexico) Jesse Carrasquedo Jr.	(Mexico) SP Driver Academy Team
4	R2	Autódromo Hermanos Rodríguez (GP Circuit) (Mexico City)	19 August		(Mexico) Jesse Carrasquedo Jr.	(Mexico) Arturo Flores	(Mexico) SP Driver Academy Team
4	R3	Autódromo Hermanos Rodríguez (GP Circuit) (Mexico City)	20 August	(Colombia) Juan Felipe Pedraza	(Mexico) Jesse Carrasquedo Jr.	(Mexico) Jesse Carrasquedo Jr.	(Mexico) SP Driver Academy Team
5	R1	Autódromo Hermanos Rodríguez (GP Circuit) (Mexico City)	2 September	(Colombia) Juan Felipe Pedraza	(Colombia) Juan Felipe Pedraza	(Colombia) Juan Felipe Pedraza	(Mexico) Ram Racing
5	R2	Autódromo Hermanos Rodríguez (GP Circuit) (Mexico City)	3 September		(Colombia) Juan Felipe Pedraza	(Mexico) Rodrigo Rejón	(Mexico) Mothers ProRally
5	R3	Autódromo Hermanos Rodríguez (GP Circuit) (Mexico City)	3 September	(Colombia) Juan Felipe Pedraza	(Colombia) Juan Felipe Pedraza	(Colombia) Juan Felipe Pedraza	(Mexico) Ram Racing
6	R1	Autódromo Hermanos Rodríguez (GP Circuit) (Mexico City)	29 October	(Colombia) Lucas Medina	(Colombia) Lucas Medina	(Colombia) Juan Felipe Pedraza	(Mexico) Ram Racing
6	R2	Autódromo Hermanos Rodríguez (GP Circuit) (Mexico City)	30 October		(Mexico) Manuel Roza	(Mexico) Manuel Roza	(Mexico) RRK Motorsports
NC	R1	Autódromo Hermanos Rodríguez (GP Circuit) (Mexico City)	10 December	(Colombia) Pedro Juan Moreno	(Mexico) Diego de la Torre	(Colombia) Pedro Juan Moreno	(Mexico) Ram Racing
NC	R2	Autódromo Hermanos Rodríguez (GP Circuit) (Mexico City)	10 December	(Colombia) Pedro Juan Moreno	(Mexico) Diego de la Torre	(Colombia) Pedro Juan Moreno	(Mexico) Ram Racing
NC	R3	Autódromo Hermanos Rodríguez (GP Circuit) (Mexico City)	10 December		(Mexico) Diego de la Torre	(Colombia) Pedro Juan Moreno	(Mexico) Ram Racing

== Championship standings ==
Points were awarded to the top 10 classified finishers in each race. The final standings were obtained by summing best four out of first five rounds and the final round.

Position	**1st**	**2nd**	**3rd**	**4th**	**5th**	**6th**	**7th**	**8th**	**9th**	**10th**
Points	25	18	15	12	10	8	6	4	2	1

=== Drivers' Championship ===
Pos	Driver	QUE			AHR1			PUE			AHR2			AHR3			AHR4		AHR5			Pts
Pos	Driver	R1	R2	R3	R1	R2	R3	R1	R2	R3	R1	R2	R3	R1	R2	R3	R1	R2	R1	R2	R3	Pts
1	(Colombia) Juan Felipe Pedraza	4	1	6	Ret	2	1	**1**	1	1	**2**	4	**6**	**1**	2	**1**	1	2				274
2	(Mexico) Julio Rejón	1	3	2	**1**	1	**2**				5	5	7	3	3	6						190
3	(Mexico) Manuel Roza	**2**	Ret	**1**	Ret	3	3	3	3	3	6	6	5	Ret	8	DNS	2	1				187
4	(Mexico) Luis Carlos Pérez	3	5	5	2	4	4	4	5	4	8	8	8	10†	7	3	Ret	6				141
5	(Mexico) Rodrigo Rejón	NC	2	3	3	Ret	Ret				3	3	4	8	1	2						137
6	(Mexico) Cristian Cantú	6	6	7				Ret	4	**Ret**				7	6	7	4	3				81
7	(Mexico) Daniel Forcadell	7	DNS	8				2	2	2	7	7	10†	9	DNS	DNS						79
8	(Mexico) Arturo Flores										4	1	2	11	Ret	WD	3	NC				70
9	(Mexico) Jesse Carrasquedo Jr.										1	2	1									68
10	(Mexico) Diego de la Torre										Ret	12	3	2	DNS	4	7	4	2	2	2	63
11	(Mexico) Eduardo Alquicira	DNP	7†	DNS	4	6	Ret	6	7	5	10	11	Ret				8	Ret				55
12	(Mexico) Marco Alquicira							5	6	DNS	9	9	Ret	5	4	8	Ret	9				50
13	(Mexico) Esteban Rodríguez				Ret	5	5	WD	WD	WD	11	10	9	6	10†	Ret	6	5				50
14	(Mexico) Alejandro Berumen													4	5	5						32
15	(Mexico) Emil Abed	Ret	4	4																		24
16	(Mexico) Joe Sandoval	5	DNS	Ret																		10
17	(Colombia) Lucas Medina																**5**	Ret				10
18	(Mexico) Julián Díaz													12	9	9	9	8				10
19	(Mexico) Oscar Alquicira				DNP	7	Ret	WD	WD	WD												6
20	(Mexico) Dewey Richards																Ret	7	Ret	Ret	Ret	6
21	(Mexico) Juan Contreras													DNS	11†	DNS	10	10				2
–	(Mexico) Gerardo Rejón Jr.							Ret	DNS	DNS												–
–	(Mexico) Gerardo Rejón Sr.							Ret	DNS	DNS												–
Non Championship Round-only drivers
–	(Colombia) Pedro Juan Moreno																		**1**	**1**	1	–
Pos	Driver	R1	R2	R3	R1	R2	R3	R1	R2	R3	R1	R2	R3	R1	R2	R3	R1	R2	R1	R2	R3	Pts
Pos	Driver	QUE			AHR1			PUE			AHR2			AHR3			AHR4		AHR5			Pts

Colour	Result
Gold	Winner
Silver	Second place
Bronze	Third place
Green	Points classification
Blue	Non-points classification
Blue	Non-classified finish (NC)
Purple	Retired, not classified (Ret)
Red	Did not qualify (DNQ)
Red	Did not pre-qualify (DNPQ)
Black	Disqualified (DSQ)
White	Did not start (DNS)
White	Withdrew (WD)
White	Race cancelled (C)
Blank	Did not practice (DNP)
Blank	Did not arrive (DNA)
Blank	Excluded (EX)

**Bold** – Pole
Italics – Fastest Lap
