= 2026 General Tire 150 (Phoenix) =

ARCA Menards Series and ARCA Menards Series West combination race at Phoenix Raceway

Race details
- Race 2 of 20 in the 2026 ARCA Menards Series; Race 2 of 13 in the 2026 ARCA Menards Series West
- Date: March 5, 2026
- Location: Phoenix Raceway in Avondale, Arizona
- Course: Permanent racing facility
- Course length: 1.000 miles (1.609 km)
- Distance: 157 laps, 157 mi (252.667 km)
- Scheduled distance: 150 laps, 150 mi (240 km)
- Average speed: 80.536 miles per hour (129.610 km/h)

Pole position
Driver	Carson Brown	Pinnacle Racing Group
- Time: 27.670

Most laps led
Driver	Carson Brown	Pinnacle Racing Group
- Laps: 157

Fastest lap
Driver	Carson Brown	Pinnacle Racing Group
- Time: 28.321

Winner
No. 28	Carson Brown	Pinnacle Racing Group

Television in the United States
- Network: FS1
- Announcers: Brent Stover and Phil Parsons

Radio in the United States
- Radio: ARN

The 2026 General Tire 150 was an ARCA Menards Series and ARCA Menards Series West race held on Thursday, March 5, 2026, at Phoenix Raceway in Avondale, Arizona. Contested over 157 laps—extended from 150 laps due to an overtime finish on the 1.000 mi (1.609 km) oval, it was the second race of the 2026 ARCA Menards Series season, the second race of the 2026 ARCA Menards Series West season, and the seventh running of the event.

In a wreck-filled race, Carson Brown, driving for Pinnacle Racing Group, put on a blistering performance, leading every lap from the pole position and held off teammate Tristan McKee on the final restart to earn his first career ARCA Menards Series win in his first career start, his first career ARCA Menards Series West win. McKee finished second, and Thomas Annunziata finished third. Trevor Huddleston and Mason Massey rounded out the top five, while Jake Bollman, Isaac Kitzmiller, Taylor Mayhew, Max Reaves, and Robbie Kennealy rounded out the top ten.

== Report ==
=== Background ===
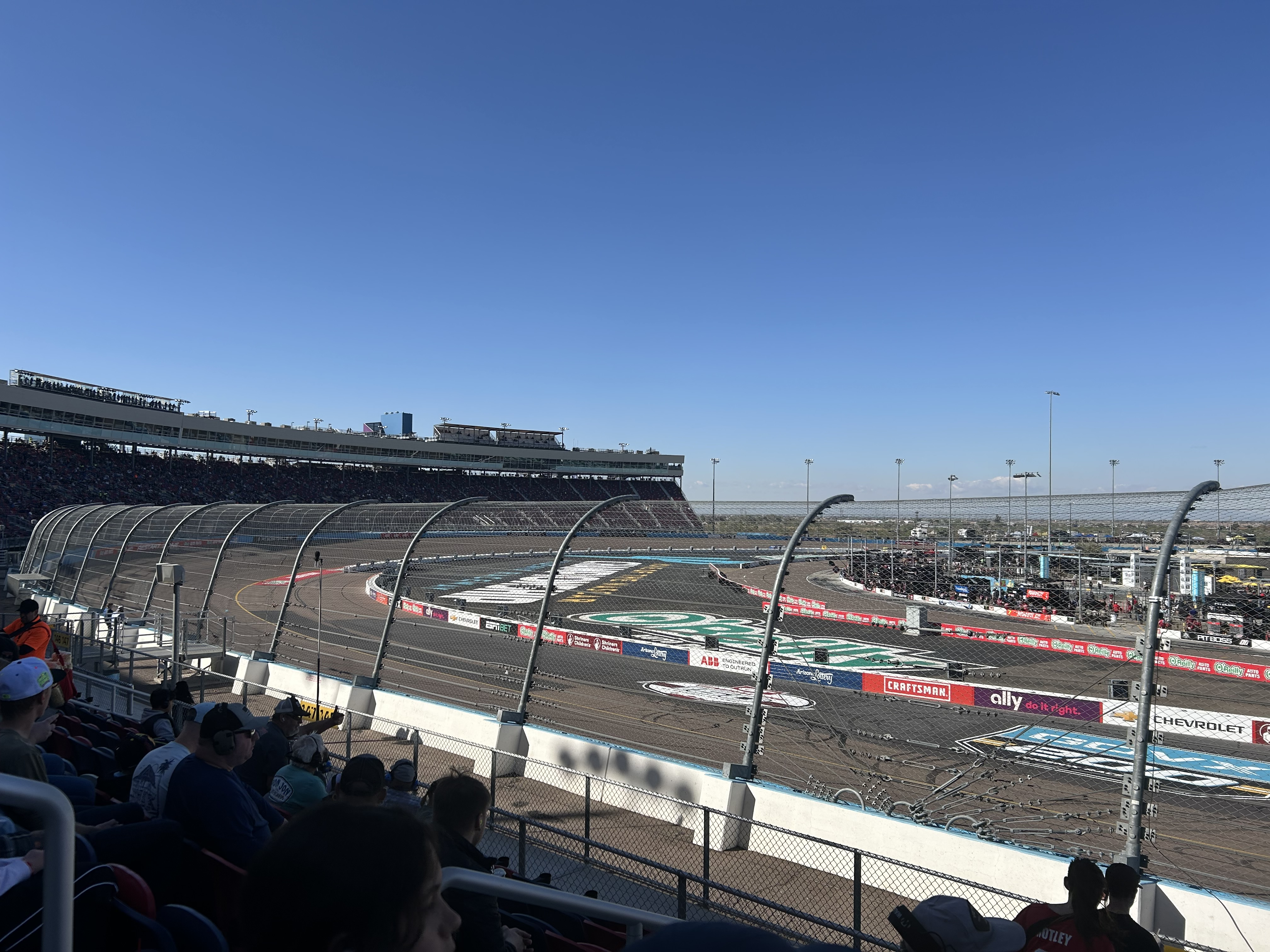
Phoenix Raceway, the track where the race was held.

Phoenix Raceway is a 1-mile, low-banked tri-oval race track located in Avondale, Arizona, near Phoenix. The motorsport track opened in 1964 and currently hosts two NASCAR race weekends annually including the final championship race since 2020. Phoenix Raceway has also hosted the CART, IndyCar Series, USAC and the WeatherTech SportsCar Championship. The raceway is currently owned and operated by NASCAR.

==== Entry list ====
- (R) denotes rookie driver.

#	Driver	Team	Make
01	Cole Denton (R)	Jan's Towing Racing	Ford
1	Tony Cosentino	Maples Motorsports	Chevrolet
03	Alex Clubb	Clubb Racing Inc.	Ford
4	Monty Tipton	Nascimento Motorsports	Toyota
05	David Smith	Shockwave Motorsports	Toyota
5	Eric Johnson Jr.	Jerry Pitts Racing	Toyota
06	Bobby Hillis Jr.	Fierce Creature Racing	Chevrolet
7	Gavin Ray (R)	Jerry Pitts Racing	Toyota
9	Nate Moeller	Fast Track Racing	Ford
10	Brad Perez	Fast Track Racing	Ford
11	Dustin Hillenburg	Fast Track Racing	Toyota
12	Takuma Koga	Fast Track Racing	Toyota
13	Taylor Reimer	Central Coast Racing	Toyota
15	Mia Lovell (R)	Nitro Motorsports	Toyota
16	Hailie Deegan	Bill McAnally Racing	Chevrolet
17	Taylor Mayhew	Cook Racing Technologies	Toyota
18	Max Reaves (R)	Joe Gibbs Racing	Toyota
19	Zachary Tinkle	Maples Motorsports	Chevrolet
20	Jake Bollman (R)	Nitro Motorsports	Toyota
25	Julian DaCosta (R)	Nitro Motorsports	Toyota
28	Carson Brown (R)	Pinnacle Racing Group	Chevrolet
41	Robbie Kennealy	Jan's Towing Racing	Ford
42	Jaiden Reyna	Cook Racing Technologies	Chevrolet
48	Brad Smith	Brad Smith Motorsports	Ford
50	Trevor Huddleston	High Point Racing	Ford
51	Tyler Tomassi	Strike Mamba Racing	Chevrolet
55	Isabella Robusto	Nitro Motorsports	Toyota
56	Andrew Chapman (R)	High Point Racing	Ford
70	Thomas Annunziata	Nitro Motorsports	Toyota
71	Andy Jankowiak	KLAS Motorsports	Chevrolet
72	Cody Dennison	Strike Mamba Racing	Chevrolet
77	Tristan McKee	Pinnacle Racing Group	Chevrolet
79	Isaac Kitzmiller	ACR Motorsports	Chevrolet
81	Mason Massey	Bill McAnally Racing	Chevrolet
86	Jeff Maconi (R)	Clubb Racing Inc.	Ford
89	Bobby Dale Earnhardt	Rise Racing	Chevrolet
90	Jade Avedisian (R)	Nitro Motorsports	Toyota
91	Ryan Vargas	Maples Motorsports	Ford
97	Jason Kitzmiller	CR7 Motorsports	Chevrolet
99	Michael Maples	Maples Motorsports	Chevrolet
Official entry list

== Practice ==
The first and only practice session was held on Thursday, March 5, at 1:30 PM MST, and lasted for 45 minutes.

Tristan McKee, driving for Pinnacle Racing Group, set the fastest time in the session, with a lap of 27.999 seconds, and a speed of 128.576 miles per hour (206.923 km/h).

=== Practice results ===
Pos.	#	Driver	Team	Make	Time	Speed
1	77	Tristan McKee	Pinnacle Racing Group	Chevrolet	27.999	128.576
2	70	Thomas Annunziata	Nitro Motorsports	Toyota	28.009	128.530
3	18	Max Reaves (R)	Joe Gibbs Racing	Toyota	28.147	127.900
Full practice results

== Qualifying ==
Qualifying was held on Thursday, March 5, at 2:30 PM MST. The qualifying procedure used was a multi-car, multi-lap based system. All drivers were on track for a 20-minute timed session, and whoever set the fastest time in that session won the pole.

Carson Brown, driving for Pinnacle Racing Group, qualified on pole position with a lap of 27.670 seconds, and a speed of 130.105 miles per hour (209.384 km/h).

=== Qualifying results ===
Pos.	#	Driver	Team	Make	Time	Speed
1	28	Carson Brown (R)	Pinnacle Racing Group	Chevrolet	27.670	130.105
2	77	Tristan McKee	Pinnacle Racing Group	Chevrolet	27.806	129.468
3	20	Jake Bollman (R)	Nitro Motorsports	Toyota	27.823	129.389
4	79	Isaac Kitzmiller	ACR Motorsports	Chevrolet	27.858	129.227
5	70	Thomas Annunziata	Nitro Motorsports	Toyota	27.875	129.148
6	71	Andy Jankowiak	KLAS Motorsports	Chevrolet	27.935	128.871
7	90	Jade Avedisian (R)	Nitro Motorsports	Toyota	27.952	128.792
8	97	Jason Kitzmiller	CR7 Motorsports	Chevrolet	27.968	128.719
9	41	Robbie Kennealy	Jan's Towing Racing	Ford	28.122	128.014
10	18	Max Reaves (R)	Joe Gibbs Racing	Toyota	28.178	127.759
11	5	Eric Johnson Jr.	Jerry Pitts Racing	Toyota	28.196	127.678
12	55	Isabella Robusto	Nitro Motorsports	Toyota	28.254	127.416
13	17	Taylor Mayhew	Cook Racing Technologies	Toyota	28.266	127.361
14	81	Mason Massey	Bill McAnally Racing	Chevrolet	28.310	127.164
15	15	Mia Lovell (R)	Nitro Motorsports	Toyota	28.364	126.921
16	50	Trevor Huddleston	High Point Racing	Ford	28.426	126.645
17	91	Ryan Vargas	Maples Motorsports	Ford	28.566	126.024
18	7	Gavin Ray (R)	Jerry Pitts Racing	Toyota	28.586	125.936
19	16	Hailie Deegan	Bill McAnally Racing	Chevrolet	28.650	125.654
20	4	Monty Tipton	Nascimento Motorsports	Toyota	28.680	125.523
21	01	Cole Denton (R)	Jan's Towing Racing	Ford	28.720	125.348
22	25	Julian DaCosta (R)	Nitro Motorsports	Toyota	28.757	125.187
23	13	Taylor Reimer	Central Coast Racing	Toyota	28.870	124.697
24	42	Jaiden Reyna	Cook Racing Technologies	Chevrolet	28.897	124.580
25	10	Brad Perez	Fast Track Racing	Ford	28.970	124.266
26	19	Zachary Tinkle	Maples Motorsports	Chevrolet	29.345	122.678
27	56	Andrew Chapman (R)	High Point Racing	Ford	29.708	121.179
28	51	Tyler Tomassi	Strike Mamba Racing	Chevrolet	29.943	120.228
29	89	Bobby Dale Earnhardt	Rise Racing	Chevrolet	30.045	119.820
30	99	Michael Maples	Maples Motorsports	Chevrolet	30.309	118.777
31	72	Cody Dennison	Strike Mamba Racing	Chevrolet	30.443	118.254
32	05	David Smith	Shockwave Motorsports	Toyota	30.714	117.210
33	1	Tony Cosentino	Maples Motorsports	Chevrolet	30.719	117.191
34	03	Alex Clubb	Clubb Racing Inc.	Ford	31.136	115.622
35	11	Dustin Hillenburg	Fast Track Racing	Toyota	31.529	114.181
36	48	Brad Smith	Brad Smith Motorsports	Ford	32.849	109.592
37	9	Nate Moeller	Fast Track Racing	Ford	33.157	108.574
38	06	Bobby Hillis Jr.	Fierce Creature Racing	Chevrolet	—	—
39	12	Takuma Koga	Fast Track Racing	Toyota	—	—
40	86	Jeff Maconi (R)	Clubb Racing Inc.	Ford	—	—
Official qualifying results

== Race ==
=== Race results ===
Laps: 157

Fin	St	#	Driver	Team	Make	Laps	Led	Status	Pts
1	1	28	Carson Brown (R)	Pinnacle Racing Group	Chevrolet	157	157	Running	49
2	2	77	Tristan McKee	Pinnacle Racing Group	Chevrolet	157	0	Running	42
3	5	70	Thomas Annunziata	Nitro Motorsports	Toyota	157	0	Running	41
4	16	50	Trevor Huddleston	High Point Racing	Ford	157	0	Running	40
5	14	81	Mason Massey	Bill McAnally Racing	Chevrolet	157	0	Running	39
6	3	20	Jake Bollman (R)	Nitro Motorsports	Toyota	157	0	Running	38
7	4	79	Isaac Kitzmiller	ACR Motorsports	Chevrolet	157	0	Running	37
8	13	17	Taylor Mayhew	Cook Racing Technologies	Toyota	157	0	Running	36
9	10	18	Max Reaves (R)	Joe Gibbs Racing	Toyota	157	0	Running	35
10	9	41	Robbie Kennealy	Jan's Towing Racing	Ford	157	0	Running	34
11	19	16	Hailie Deegan	Bill McAnally Racing	Chevrolet	157	0	Running	33
12	20	4	Monty Tipton	Nascimento Motorsports	Toyota	157	0	Running	32
13	11	5	Eric Johnson Jr.	Jerry Pitts Racing	Toyota	157	0	Running	31
14	24	42	Jaiden Reyna	Cook Racing Technologies	Chevrolet	155	0	Running	30
15	27	56	Andrew Chapman (R)	High Point Racing	Ford	155	0	Running	29
16	8	97	Jason Kitzmiller	CR7 Motorsports	Chevrolet	155	0	Running	28
17	17	91	Ryan Vargas	Maples Motorsports	Ford	154	0	Running	27
18	6	71	Andy Jankowiak	KLAS Motorsports	Chevrolet	154	0	Running	26
19	31	72	Cody Dennison	Strike Mamba Racing	Chevrolet	154	0	Running	25
20	30	99	Michael Maples	Maples Motorsports	Chevrolet	152	0	Running	24
21	12	55	Isabella Robusto	Nitro Motorsports	Toyota	150	0	Running	23
22	34	03	Alex Clubb	Clubb Racing Inc.	Ford	150	0	Running	22
23	39	12	Takuma Koga	Fast Track Racing	Toyota	150	0	Running	21
24	21	01	Cole Denton (R)	Jan's Towing Racing	Ford	149	0	Running	20
25	33	1	Tony Cosentino	Maples Motorsports	Chevrolet	149	0	Running	19
26	32	05	David Smith	Shockwave Motorsports	Toyota	149	0	Running	18
27	35	11	Dustin Hillenburg	Fast Track Racing	Toyota	149	0	Running	17
28	7	90	Jade Avedisian (R)	Nitro Motorsports	Toyota	142	0	Running	16
29	18	7	Gavin Ray (R)	Jerry Pitts Racing	Toyota	114	0	Accident	15
30	15	15	Mia Lovell (R)	Nitro Motorsports	Toyota	100	0	Accident	14
31	22	25	Julian DaCosta (R)	Nitro Motorsports	Toyota	99	0	Accident	13
32	23	13	Taylor Reimer	Central Coast Racing	Toyota	99	0	Accident	12
33	28	51	Tyler Tomassi	Strike Mamba Racing	Chevrolet	44	0	Mechanical	11
34	25	10	Brad Perez	Fast Track Racing	Ford	36	0	Mechanical	10
35	26	19	Zachary Tinkle	Maples Motorsports	Chevrolet	14	0	Accident	9
36	37	9	Nate Moeller	Fast Track Racing	Ford	6	0	Mechanical	8
37	29	89	Bobby Dale Earnhardt	Rise Racing	Chevrolet	1	0	Accident	7
38	38	06	Bobby Hillis Jr.	Fierce Creature Racing	Chevrolet	1	0	Accident	6
39	36	48	Brad Smith	Brad Smith Motorsports	Ford	1	0	Accident	5
40	40	86	Jeff Maconi (R)	Clubb Racing Inc.	Ford	0	0	DNS	4
Official race results

=== Race statistics ===
- Lead changes: 1 among 1 different driver
- Cautions/Laps: 9 for 56 laps
- Red flags: 0
- Time of race: 1 hour, 56 minutes and 5 seconds
- Average speed: 80.536 miles per hour (129.610 km/h)

== Standings after the race ==
Drivers' Championship standings (ARCA Main)

	Pos	Driver	Points
6	1	Jake Bollman	74
3	2	Jason Kitzmiller	65 (–9)
4	3	Ryan Vargas	64 (–10)
11	4	Robbie Kennealy	63 (–11)
4	5	Andy Jankowiak	60 (–14)
20	6	Thomas Annunziata	59 (–15)
4	7	Michael Maples	56 (–18)
	8	Carson Brown	49 (–25)
7	9	Takuma Koga	49 (–25)
9	10	Gio Ruggiero	47 (–27)

Drivers' Championship standings (ARCA West)

	Pos	Driver	Points
	1	Mason Massey	86
3	2	Trevor Huddleston	80 (–6)
	3	Taylor Mayhew	77 (–9)
2	4	Hailie Deegan	71 (–15)
6	5	Eric Johnson Jr.	64 (–22)
7	6	Jaiden Reyna	61 (–25)
13	7	Robbie Kennealy	58 (–28)
8	8	Andrew Chapman	57 (–29)
5	9	Cody Dennison	55 (–31)
	10	Cole Denton	54 (–33)

- Note: Only the first 10 positions are included for the driver standings.

Previous race: 2026 General Tire 200	ARCA Menards Series; 2026 season	Next race: 2026 Tide 150

Previous race: 2026 Oil Workers 150	ARCA Menards Series West; 2026 season	Next race: 2026 Tucson ARCA Menards West 150
