= 2016 Ford EcoBoost 200 =

23rd race of the 2016 NASCAR Camping World Truck Series

Race details
- Race 23 of 23 of the 2016 NASCAR Camping World Truck Series
- Date: November 18, 2016
- Official name: 21st Annual Ford EcoBoost 200
- Location: Homestead–Miami Speedway, Homestead, Florida
- Course: Permanent racing facility
- Course length: 1.5 miles (2.4 km)
- Distance: 134 laps, 201 mi (323 km)
- Scheduled distance: 134 laps, 201 mi (323 km)
- Average speed: 129.747 mph (208.808 km/h)

Pole position
Driver	William Byron	Kyle Busch Motorsports
- Time: 31.600

Most laps led
Driver	Kyle Larson	GMS Racing
- Laps: 76

Winner
No. 9	William Byron	Kyle Busch Motorsports

Television in the United States
- Network: FS1
- Announcers: Vince Welch, Phil Parsons, and Michael Waltrip

Radio in the United States
- Radio: MRN

The 2016 Ford EcoBoost 200 was the 23rd and final stock car race of the 2016 NASCAR Camping World Truck Series, the championship 4 race, and the 21st iteration of the event. The race was held on Friday, November 18, 2016, in Homestead, Florida, at Homestead–Miami Speedway, a 1.5-mile (2.4 km) permanent tri-oval shaped speedway. The race took the scheduled 134 laps to complete. William Byron, driving for Kyle Busch Motorsports, made a pass on Tyler Reddick for the lead with 10 laps to go, and earned his 7th career NASCAR Camping World Truck Series win. Kyle Larson mainly dominated the race, leading 76 laps.

Meanwhile, Johnny Sauter, driving for GMS Racing, would clinch his first NASCAR Camping World Truck Series championship, after finishing in third, behind Reddick.

== Background ==
The layout of Homestead–Miami Speedway, the venue where the race was held.

Homestead–Miami Speedway is a motor racing track located in Homestead, Florida. The track, which has several configurations, has promoted several series of racing, including NASCAR, the IndyCar Series, the WeatherTech SportsCar Championship series, and the Championship Cup Series.

From 2002 to 2019, Homestead–Miami Speedway hosted the final race of the season in all three of NASCAR's series: the Sprint Cup Series, Xfinity Series, and the Camping World Truck Series. Ford Motor Company sponsored all three of the season-ending races, under the names Ford EcoBoost 400, Ford EcoBoost 300, and Ford EcoBoost 200, respectively. The weekend itself was marketed as Ford Championship Weekend.

=== Entry list ===
- (R) denotes rookie driver.
- (i) denotes driver who is ineligible for series driver points.
- (CC) denotes championship contender.

#	Driver	Team	Make	Sponsor
00	Cole Custer (R)	JR Motorsports	Chevrolet	Haas Automation
1	Travis Kvapil	MAKE Motorsports	Chevrolet	CorvetteParts.net
02	Scott Lagasse Jr. (i)	Young's Motorsports	Chevrolet	Alert Today Florida, Florida Lottery
4	Christopher Bell (R) (CC)	Kyle Busch Motorsports	Toyota	JBL
05	Brady Boswell	Athenian Motorsports	Chevrolet	Boswell Electrical Supply, Bias Corp.
07	Patrick Staropoli	SS-Green Light Racing	Chevrolet	AutoNation Cure Bowl
8	John Hunter Nemechek	NEMCO Motorsports	Chevrolet	Fire Alarm Services
9	William Byron (R)	Kyle Busch Motorsports	Toyota	Liberty University
10	Jennifer Jo Cobb	Jennifer Jo Cobb Racing	Chevrolet	Driven2Honor.org
11	Matt Tifft (R)	Red Horse Racing	Toyota	Brain Gear, Surface Sunscreen
13	Cameron Hayley	ThorSport Racing	Toyota	Mattei Air Compressors
16	Stewart Friesen	Halmar Racing	Chevrolet	Halmar International
17	Timothy Peters (CC)	Red Horse Racing	Toyota	Red Horse Racing
18	Noah Gragson	Wauters Motorsports	Toyota	SpeedVegas, Alert ID
19	Daniel Hemric	Brad Keselowski Racing	Ford	DrawTite
20	Austin Hill	Austin Hill Racing	Ford	Lone Survivor Foundation
21	Johnny Sauter (CC)	GMS Racing	Chevrolet	Allegiant Travel Company
22	Austin Wayne Self (R)	AM Racing	Toyota	American Victory
23	Spencer Gallagher	GMS Racing	Chevrolet	Allegiant Travel Company
24	Kyle Larson (i)	GMS Racing	Chevrolet	DC Solar
29	Tyler Reddick	Brad Keselowski Racing	Ford	Cooper-Standard Automotive
33	Ben Kennedy	GMS Racing	Chevrolet	Jacob Companies
41	Ben Rhodes (R)	ThorSport Racing	Toyota	Alpha Energy Solutions
44	Tommy Joe Martins	Martins Motorsports	Chevrolet	BootDaddy.com, Diamond Gusset Jeans
49	Reed Sorenson (i)	Premium Motorsports	Chevrolet	Premium Motorsports
50	Spencer Boyd	MAKE Motorsports	Chevrolet	GruntStyle.com
51	Daniel Suárez (i)	Kyle Busch Motorsports	Toyota	Arris
63	Norm Benning	Norm Benning Racing	Chevrolet	Strategic Public Affairs
66	Jordan Anderson	Bolen Motorsports	Chevrolet	Columbia SC - Famously Hot
71	Alon Day	Contreras Motorsports	Chevrolet	FLwaterfront.com
81	Ryan Truex	Hattori Racing Enterprises	Toyota	Chiba Toyopet
88	Matt Crafton (CC)	ThorSport Racing	Toyota	Hormel's Black Label Bacon, Menards
92	Grant Enfinger (R)	RBR Enterprises	Ford	Black's Tire Service, Goodyear
97	Jesse Little	JJL Motorsports	Toyota	Carolina Nut Co.
98	Rico Abreu (R)	ThorSport Racing	Toyota	Safelite, Curb Records
Official entry list

== Practice ==
=== First practice ===
The first practice session was held on Friday, November 18, at 8:30 am EST, and would last for 1 hour. William Byron, driving for Kyle Busch Motorsports, would set the fastest time in the session, with a lap of 31.411, and an average speed of 171.914 mph (276.669 km/h).

Pos.	#	Driver	Team	Make	Time	Speed
1	9	William Byron (R)	Kyle Busch Motorsports	Toyota	31.411	171.914
2	24	Kyle Larson (i)	GMS Racing	Chevrolet	31.539	171.217
3	21	Johnny Sauter (CC)	GMS Racing	Chevrolet	31.549	171.162
Full first practice results

=== Final practice ===
The final practice session was held on Friday, November 18, at 10:30 am EST, and would last for 55 minutes. William Byron, driving for Kyle Busch Motorsports, would set the fastest time in the session, with a lap of 31.436, and an average speed of 171.778 mph (276.450 km/h).

Pos.	#	Driver	Team	Make	Time	Speed
1	9	William Byron (R)	Kyle Busch Motorsports	Toyota	31.436	171.778
2	51	Daniel Suárez (i)	Kyle Busch Motorsports	Toyota	31.937	169.083
3	00	Cole Custer (R)	JR Motorsports	Chevrolet	31.991	168.797
Full final practice results

== Qualifying ==
Qualifying was held on Friday, November 18, at 3:45 pm EST. Since Homestead–Miami Speedway is at least 1.5 miles (2.4 km) in length, the qualifying system was a single car, single lap, two round system where in the first round, everyone would set a time to determine positions 13–32. Then, the fastest 12 qualifiers would move on to the second round to determine positions 1–12.

William Byron, driving for Kyle Busch Motorsports, would score the pole for the race, with a lap of 31.600, and an average speed of 170.886 mph (275.014 km/h) in the second round.

Tommy Joe Martins, Jennifer Jo Cobb, and Norm Benning would fail to qualify.

=== Full qualifying results ===
Pos.	#	Driver	Team	Make	Time (R1)	Speed (R1)	Time (R2)	Speed (R2)
1	9	William Byron (R)	Kyle Busch Motorsports	Toyota	31.618	170.789	31.600	170.886
2	00	Cole Custer (R)	JR Motorsports	Chevrolet	31.772	169.961	31.616	170.800
3	24	Kyle Larson (i)	GMS Racing	Chevrolet	31.847	169.561	31.725	170.213
4	88	Matt Crafton (CC)	ThorSport Racing	Toyota	31.895	169.306	31.812	169.747
5	23	Spencer Gallagher	GMS Racing	Chevrolet	32.037	168.555	31.825	169.678
6	8	John Hunter Nemechek	NEMCO Motorsports	Chevrolet	31.904	169.258	31.963	168.945
7	29	Tyler Reddick	Brad Keselowski Racing	Ford	31.813	169.742	31.990	168.803
8	4	Christopher Bell (R) (CC)	Kyle Busch Motorsports	Toyota	32.005	168.724	32.039	168.545
9	05	Brady Boswell	Athenian Motorsports	Chevrolet	32.061	168.429	32.148	167.973
10	18	Noah Gragson	Wauters Motorsports	Toyota	32.057	168.450	32.158	167.921
11	41	Ben Rhodes (R)	ThorSport Racing	Toyota	32.039	168.545	32.197	167.717
12	97	Jesse Little	JJL Motorsports	Toyota	31.981	168.850	32.234	167.525
Eliminated in Round 1
13	17	Timothy Peters (CC)	Red Horse Racing	Toyota	32.079	168.334	–	–
14	33	Ben Kennedy	GMS Racing	Chevrolet	32.081	168.324	–	–
15	81	Ryan Truex	Hattori Racing Enterprises	Toyota	32.101	168.219	–	–
16	13	Cameron Hayley	ThorSport Racing	Toyota	32.131	168.062	–	–
17	51	Daniel Suárez (i)	Kyle Busch Motorsports	Toyota	32.163	167.895	–	–
18	19	Daniel Hemric	Brad Keselowski Racing	Ford	32.180	167.806	–	–
19	21	Johnny Sauter (CC)	GMS Racing	Chevrolet	32.213	167.634	–	–
20	98	Rico Abreu (R)	ThorSport Racing	Toyota	32.223	167.582	–	–
21	02	Scott Lagasse Jr. (i)	Young's Motorsports	Chevrolet	32.282	167.276	–	–
22	11	Matt Tifft (R)	Red Horse Racing	Toyota	32.432	166.502	–	–
23	92	Grant Enfinger (R)	RBR Enterprises	Ford	32.538	165.960	–	–
24	20	Austin Hill	Austin Hill Racing	Ford	32.654	165.370	–	–
25	16	Stewart Friesen	Halmar Racing	Chevrolet	32.695	165.163	–	–
26	07	Patrick Staropoli	SS-Green Light Racing	Chevrolet	32.932	163.974	–	–
27	22	Austin Wayne Self (R)	AM Racing	Toyota	32.946	163.905	–	–
Qualified by owner's points
28	49	Reed Sorenson (i)	Premium Motorsports	Chevrolet	33.185	162.724	–	–
29	71	Alon Day	Contreras Motorsports	Chevrolet	33.308	162.123	–	–
30	66	Jordan Anderson	Bolen Motorsports	Chevrolet	33.457	161.401	–	–
31	50	Spencer Boyd	MAKE Motorsports	Chevrolet	35.547	151.912	–	–
Past champion provisional
32	1	Travis Kvapil	MAKE Motorsports	Chevrolet	34.758	155.360	–	–
Failed to qualify
33	44	Tommy Joe Martins	Martins Motorsports	Chevrolet	33.465	161.363	–	–
34	10	Jennifer Jo Cobb	Jennifer Jo Cobb Racing	Chevrolet	33.869	159.438	–	–
35	63	Norm Benning	Norm Benning Racing	Chevrolet	35.916	150.351		
Official qualifying results
Official starting lineup

== Race results ==
Fin	St	#	Driver	Team	Make	Laps	Led	Status	Pts
1	1	9	William Byron (R)	Kyle Busch Motorsports	Toyota	134	31	Running	36
2	7	29	Tyler Reddick	Brad Keselowski Racing	Ford	134	16	Running	32
3	19	21	Johnny Sauter (CC)	GMS Racing	Chevrolet	134	0	Running	30
4	3	24	Kyle Larson (i)	GMS Racing	Chevrolet	134	76	Running	0
5	18	19	Daniel Hemric	Brad Keselowski Racing	Ford	134	0	Running	28
6	17	51	Daniel Suárez (i)	Kyle Busch Motorsports	Toyota	134	0	Running	0
7	4	88	Matt Crafton (CC)	ThorSport Racing	Toyota	134	10	Running	26
8	8	4	Christopher Bell (R) (CC)	Kyle Busch Motorsports	Toyota	134	0	Running	25
9	13	17	Timothy Peters (CC)	Red Horse Racing	Toyota	134	0	Running	24
10	2	00	Cole Custer (R)	JR Motorsports	Chevrolet	134	0	Running	23
11	6	8	John Hunter Nemechek	NEMCO Motorsports	Chevrolet	134	0	Running	22
12	22	11	Matt Tifft (R)	Red Horse Racing	Toyota	134	0	Running	21
13	20	98	Rico Abreu (R)	ThorSport Racing	Toyota	134	0	Running	20
14	14	33	Ben Kennedy	GMS Racing	Chevrolet	134	0	Running	19
15	10	18	Noah Gragson	Wauters Motorsports	Toyota	134	0	Running	18
16	16	13	Cameron Hayley	ThorSport Racing	Toyota	134	0	Running	17
17	24	20	Austin Hill	Austin Hill Racing	Ford	134	0	Running	16
18	12	97	Jesse Little	JJL Motorsports	Toyota	134	0	Running	15
19	9	05	Brady Boswell	Athenian Motorsports	Chevrolet	134	0	Running	14
20	11	41	Ben Rhodes (R)	ThorSport Racing	Toyota	134	0	Running	13
21	5	23	Spencer Gallagher	GMS Racing	Chevrolet	134	0	Running	12
22	21	02	Scott Lagasse Jr. (i)	Young's Motorsports	Chevrolet	134	0	Running	0
23	23	92	Grant Enfinger (R)	RBR Enterprises	Ford	134	0	Running	10
24	30	66	Jordan Anderson	Bolen Motorsports	Chevrolet	134	0	Running	9
25	27	22	Austin Wayne Self (R)	AM Racing	Toyota	133	0	Running	8
26	29	71	Alon Day	Contreras Motorsports	Chevrolet	131	0	Running	7
27	32	1	Travis Kvapil	MAKE Motorsports	Chevrolet	131	0	Running	6
28	28	49	Reed Sorenson (i)	Premium Motorsports	Chevrolet	130	1	Running	0
29	25	16	Stewart Friesen	Halmar Racing	Chevrolet	128	0	Running	4
30	31	50	Spencer Boyd	MAKE Motorsports	Chevrolet	128	0	Running	3
31	26	07	Patrick Staropoli	SS-Green Light Racing	Chevrolet	125	0	Running	2
32	15	81	Ryan Truex	Hattori Racing Enterprises	Toyota	49	0	Engine	1
Official race results

== Standings after the race ==
Drivers' Championship standings

	Pos	Driver	Points
	1	Johnny Sauter	4,030
	2	Matt Crafton	4,026 (−4)
	3	Christopher Bell	4,025 (−5)
	4	Timothy Peters	4,024 (−6)
	5	William Byron	2,199 (−1,831)
1	6	Daniel Hemric	2,163 (−1,867)
1	7	Ben Kennedy	2,162 (−1,868)
	8	John Hunter Nemechek	2,133 (−1,897)
Official driver's standings

- Note: Only the first 8 positions are included for the driver standings.

Previous race: 2016 Lucas Oil 150	NASCAR Camping World Truck Series; 2016 season	Next race: 2017 NextEra Energy Resources 250
