= 2026 North Carolina Education Lottery 250 =

NASCAR O'Reilly Auto Parts Series race at Rockingham Speedway

Race details
- Race 8 of 33 in the 2026 NASCAR O'Reilly Auto Parts Series
- Date: April 4, 2026
- Location: Rockingham Speedway in Rockingham, North Carolina
- Course: Permanent racing facility
- Course length: 0.94 miles (1.51 km)
- Distance: 250 laps, 235 mi (378.2 km)
- Average speed: 98.878 miles per hour (159.129 km/h)

Pole position
Driver	Corey Day	Hendrick Motorsports
- Time: 22.717

Most laps led
Driver	Corey Day	Hendrick Motorsports
- Laps: 118

Fastest lap
Driver	William Sawalich	Joe Gibbs Racing
- Time: 23.590

Winner
No. 18	William Sawalich	Joe Gibbs Racing

Television in the United States
- Network: The CW
- Announcers: Adam Alexander and Parker Kligerman

Radio in the United States
- Radio: MRN
- Booth announcers: Alex Hayden and Kyle Rickey
- Turn announcers: Tim Catafalmo (1 & 2) and Nathan Prowdi (3 & 4)

The 2026 North Carolina Education Lottery 250 was a NASCAR O'Reilly Auto Parts Series race held on Saturday, April 4, 2026, at Rockingham Speedway in Rockingham, North Carolina. Contested over 250 laps on the 0.940-mile (1.513 km) asphalt speedway, it was the eight race of the 2026 NASCAR O'Reilly Auto Parts Series season, and the second running of the event.

William Sawalich, driving for Joe Gibbs Racing, made a late charge and dominated the final stage, leading the final 79 laps and holding off his teammate Brandon Jones to earn his first career NASCAR O'Reilly Auto Parts Series win. Corey Day swept both stages and led a race-high 118 laps, before a late pit stop cycled him back, eventually rebounding to finish tenth. Jones finished second, and Justin Allgaier finished third. Rajah Caruth and Carson Kvapil rounded out the top five, while Sheldon Creed, Taylor Gray, Parker Retzlaff, Ryan Sieg, and Day rounded out the top ten.

For the second consecutive year, the race, along with the Craftsman Truck Series race would take place during the first of two bye weeks for the 2026 NASCAR Cup Series.

== Background ==
=== Report ===
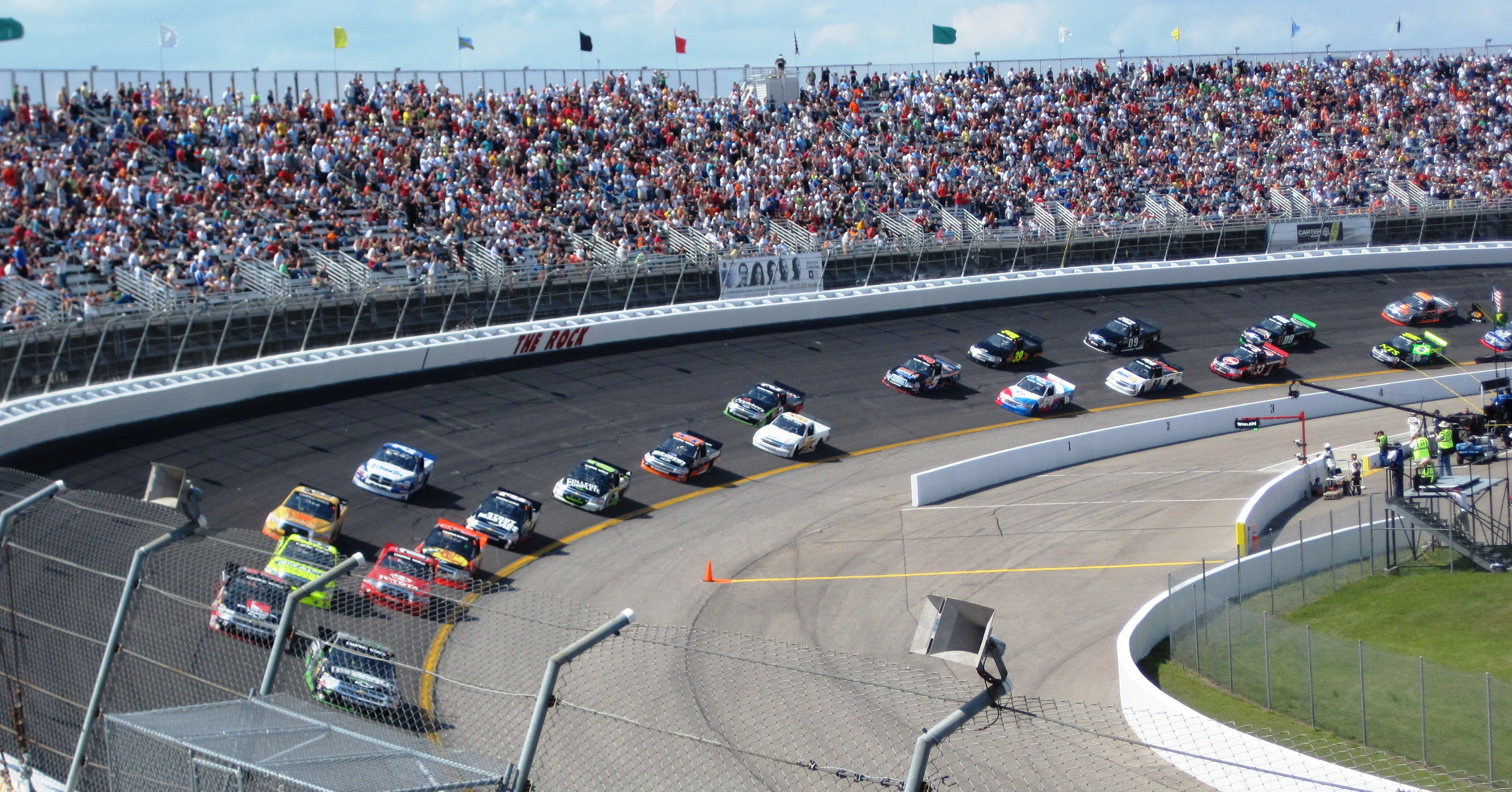
Rockingham Speedway, the track where the race will be held.

Rockingham Speedway and Entertainment Complex (formerly known as North Carolina Speedway from 1998 to 2007 and North Carolina Motor Speedway from 1965 to 1996) is a 0.94 mi (1.51 km) D-shaped oval track in Rockingham, North Carolina. The track has held a variety of events since its opening in 1965, including the NASCAR Cup Series from 1965 to 2004, and currently the NASCAR O'Reilly Auto Parts Series, NASCAR Craftsman Truck Series, and the ARCA Menards Series East. It has a 32,000-seat capacity as of 2012. Rockingham Speedway is owned by the International Hot Rod Association (IHRA).

==== Entry list ====
- (R) denotes rookie driver.

#	Driver	Team	Make
00	Sheldon Creed	Haas Factory Team	Chevrolet
0	Garrett Smithley	SS-Green Light Racing	Chevrolet
1	Carson Kvapil	JR Motorsports	Chevrolet
02	Ryan Ellis	Young's Motorsports	Chevrolet
2	Jesse Love	Richard Childress Racing	Chevrolet
5	J. J. Yeley	Hettinger Racing	Ford
07	Josh Bilicki	SS-Green Light Racing	Chevrolet
7	Justin Allgaier	JR Motorsports	Chevrolet
8	Sammy Smith	JR Motorsports	Chevrolet
17	Corey Day	Hendrick Motorsports	Chevrolet
18	William Sawalich	Joe Gibbs Racing	Toyota
19	Brent Crews (R)	Joe Gibbs Racing	Toyota
20	Brandon Jones	Joe Gibbs Racing	Toyota
21	Austin Hill	Richard Childress Racing	Chevrolet
24	Harrison Burton	Sam Hunt Racing	Toyota
26	Dean Thompson	Sam Hunt Racing	Toyota
27	Jeb Burton	Jordan Anderson Racing	Chevrolet
28	Kyle Sieg	RSS Racing	Chevrolet
31	Blaine Perkins	Jordan Anderson Racing	Chevrolet
32	Andrew Patterson	Jordan Anderson Racing	Chevrolet
33	Cleetus McFarland	Richard Childress Racing	Chevrolet
35	Joey Gase	Joey Gase Motorsports	Chevrolet
39	Ryan Sieg	RSS Racing	Chevrolet
41	Sam Mayer	Haas Factory Team	Chevrolet
42	Nathan Byrd	Young's Motorsports	Chevrolet
44	Brennan Poole	Alpha Prime Racing	Chevrolet
45	Lavar Scott (R)	Alpha Prime Racing	Chevrolet
48	Patrick Staropoli (R)	Big Machine Racing	Chevrolet
51	Jeremy Clements	Jeremy Clements Racing	Chevrolet
54	Taylor Gray	Joe Gibbs Racing	Toyota
55	Blake Lothian	Joey Gase Motorsports	Chevrolet
74	Dawson Cram	Mike Harmon Racing	Chevrolet
87	Austin Green	Peterson Racing	Chevrolet
88	Rajah Caruth	JR Motorsports	Chevrolet
91	Alex Labbé	DGM Racing	Chevrolet
92	Josh Williams	DGM Racing	Chevrolet
96	Anthony Alfredo	Viking Motorsports	Chevrolet
99	Parker Retzlaff	Viking Motorsports	Chevrolet
Official entry list

== Practice ==
The first and only practice session was held on Friday, April 3, at 1:30 PM EST, and lasted for 50 minutes, although it was delayed numerous times due to inclement weather.

Kyle Sieg, driving for RSS Racing, set the fastest time in the session, with a lap of 23.208 seconds, and a speed of 145.812 miles per hour (234.662 km/h).

=== Practice results ===
Pos.	#	Driver	Team	Make	Time	Speed
1	28	Kyle Sieg	RSS Racing	Chevrolet	23.208	145.812
2	39	Ryan Sieg	RSS Racing	Chevrolet	23.212	145.787
3	21	Austin Hill	Richard Childress Racing	Chevrolet	23.216	145.762
Full practice results

== Qualifying ==
Qualifying was held on Friday, April 3, at 2:35 PM EST. Since Rockingham Speedway is a mile oval, the qualifying procedure used was a single-car, one-lap system with one round. Drivers were on track by themselves and had one lap to post a qualifying time, and whoever set the fastest time won the pole.

Corey Day, driving for Hendrick Motorsports, qualified on pole position with a lap of 22.717 seconds, and a speed of 148.963 miles per hour (239.733 km/h).

No drivers failed to qualify.

=== Qualifying results ===
Pos.	#	Driver	Team	Make	Time	Speed
1	17	Corey Day	Hendrick Motorsports	Chevrolet	22.717	148.963
2	2	Jesse Love	Richard Childress Racing	Chevrolet	22.781	148.545
3	99	Parker Retzlaff	Viking Motorsports	Chevrolet	22.822	148.278
4	7	Justin Allgaier	JR Motorsports	Chevrolet	22.823	148.271
5	1	Carson Kvapil	JR Motorsports	Chevrolet	22.839	148.168
6	54	Taylor Gray	Joe Gibbs Racing	Toyota	22.850	148.096
7	41	Sam Mayer	Haas Factory Team	Chevrolet	22.852	148.083
8	20	Brandon Jones	Joe Gibbs Racing	Toyota	22.860	148.031
9	00	Sheldon Creed	Haas Factory Team	Chevrolet	22.863	148.012
10	19	Brent Crews (R)	Joe Gibbs Racing	Toyota	22.888	147.850
11	21	Austin Hill	Richard Childress Racing	Chevrolet	22.891	147.831
12	39	Ryan Sieg	RSS Racing	Chevrolet	22.893	147.818
13	88	Rajah Caruth	JR Motorsports	Chevrolet	22.894	147.812
14	18	William Sawalich	Joe Gibbs Racing	Toyota	22.958	147.400
15	96	Anthony Alfredo	Viking Motorsports	Chevrolet	22.967	147.342
16	24	Harrison Burton	Sam Hunt Racing	Toyota	22.967	147.342
17	51	Jeremy Clements	Jeremy Clements Racing	Chevrolet	23.043	146.856
18	26	Dean Thompson	Sam Hunt Racing	Toyota	23.058	146.760
19	8	Sammy Smith	JR Motorsports	Chevrolet	23.088	146.570
20	45	Lavar Scott (R)	Alpha Prime Racing	Chevrolet	23.128	146.316
21	28	Kyle Sieg	RSS Racing	Chevrolet	23.158	146.127
22	48	Patrick Staropoli (R)	Big Machine Racing	Chevrolet	23.165	146.082
23	87	Austin Green	Peterson Racing	Chevrolet	23.179	145.994
24	44	Brennan Poole	Alpha Prime Racing	Chevrolet	23.265	145.455
25	92	Josh Williams	DGM Racing	Chevrolet	23.343	144.969
26	42	Nathan Byrd	Young's Motorsports	Chevrolet	23.390	144.677
27	31	Blaine Perkins	Jordan Anderson Racing	Chevrolet	23.417	144.510
28	5	J. J. Yeley	Hettinger Racing	Ford	23.489	144.067
29	27	Jeb Burton	Jordan Anderson Racing	Chevrolet	23.500	144.000
30	91	Alex Labbé	DGM Racing	Chevrolet	23.529	143.823
31	32	Andrew Patterson	Jordan Anderson Racing	Chevrolet	23.578	143.524
32	02	Ryan Ellis	Young's Motorsports	Chevrolet	23.578	143.524
Qualified by owner's points
33	07	Josh Bilicki	SS-Green Light Racing	Chevrolet	23.669	142.972
34	74	Dawson Cram	Mike Harmon Racing	Chevrolet	23.871	141.762
35	33	Cleetus McFarland	Richard Childress Racing	Chevrolet	23.978	141.129
36	35	Joey Gase	Joey Gase Motorsports	Chevrolet	24.074	140.567
37	55	Blake Lothian	Joey Gase Motorsports	Chevrolet	24.686	137.082
38	0	Garrett Smithley	SS-Green Light Racing	Chevrolet	—	—
Official qualifying results
Official starting lineup

== Race ==
=== Race results ===
==== Stage results ====
Stage One Laps: 60

Pos.	#	Driver	Team	Make	Pts
1	17	Corey Day	Hendrick Motorsports	Chevrolet	10
2	54	Taylor Gray	Joe Gibbs Racing	Toyota	9
3	20	Brandon Jones	Joe Gibbs Racing	Toyota	8
4	7	Justin Allgaier	JR Motorsports	Chevrolet	7
5	18	William Sawalich	Joe Gibbs Racing	Toyota	6
6	2	Jesse Love	Richard Childress Racing	Chevrolet	5
7	8	Sammy Smith	JR Motorsports	Chevrolet	4
8	19	Brent Crews (R)	Joe Gibbs Racing	Toyota	3
9	88	Rajah Caruth	JR Motorsports	Chevrolet	2
10	99	Parker Retzlaff	Viking Motorsports	Chevrolet	1

Stage Two Laps: 60

Pos.	#	Driver	Team	Make	Pts
1	17	Corey Day	Hendrick Motorsports	Chevrolet	10
2	18	William Sawalich	Joe Gibbs Racing	Toyota	9
3	7	Justin Allgaier	JR Motorsports	Chevrolet	8
4	19	Brent Crews (R)	Joe Gibbs Racing	Toyota	7
5	20	Brandon Jones	Joe Gibbs Racing	Toyota	6
6	88	Rajah Caruth	JR Motorsports	Chevrolet	5
7	99	Parker Retzlaff	Viking Motorsports	Chevrolet	4
8	00	Sheldon Creed	Haas Factory Team	Chevrolet	3
9	51	Jeremy Clements	Jeremy Clements Racing	Chevrolet	2
10	1	Carson Kvapil	JR Motorsports	Chevrolet	1

=== Final Stage results ===
Stage Three Laps: 130

Fin	St	#	Driver	Team	Make	Laps	Led	Status	Pts
1	14	18	William Sawalich	Joe Gibbs Racing	Toyota	250	80	Running	71
2	8	20	Brandon Jones	Joe Gibbs Racing	Toyota	250	0	Running	49
3	4	7	Justin Allgaier	JR Motorsports	Chevrolet	250	1	Running	49
4	13	88	Rajah Caruth	JR Motorsports	Chevrolet	250	0	Running	40
5	5	1	Carson Kvapil	JR Motorsports	Chevrolet	250	0	Running	33
6	9	00	Sheldon Creed	Haas Factory Team	Chevrolet	250	0	Running	34
7	6	54	Taylor Gray	Joe Gibbs Racing	Toyota	250	6	Running	39
8	3	99	Parker Retzlaff	Viking Motorsports	Chevrolet	250	0	Running	34
9	12	39	Ryan Sieg	RSS Racing	Chevrolet	250	0	Running	28
10	1	17	Corey Day	Hendrick Motorsports	Chevrolet	250	118	Running	47
11	11	21	Austin Hill	Richard Childress Racing	Chevrolet	250	0	Running	26
12	19	8	Sammy Smith	JR Motorsports	Chevrolet	250	0	Running	29
13	16	24	Harrison Burton	Sam Hunt Racing	Toyota	250	0	Running	24
14	24	44	Brennan Poole	Alpha Prime Racing	Chevrolet	250	0	Running	23
15	20	45	Lavar Scott (R)	Alpha Prime Racing	Chevrolet	250	0	Running	22
16	26	42	Nathan Byrd	Young's Motorsports	Chevrolet	250	0	Running	21
17	29	27	Jeb Burton	Jordan Anderson Racing	Chevrolet	250	0	Running	20
18	30	91	Alex Labbé	DGM Racing	Chevrolet	250	0	Running	19
19	25	92	Josh Williams	DGM Racing	Chevrolet	250	0	Running	18
20	28	5	J. J. Yeley	Hettinger Racing	Ford	250	0	Running	17
21	31	32	Andrew Patterson	Jordan Anderson Racing	Chevrolet	250	0	Running	16
22	32	02	Ryan Ellis	Young's Motorsports	Chevrolet	249	0	Running	15
23	27	31	Blaine Perkins	Jordan Anderson Racing	Chevrolet	249	0	Running	14
24	15	96	Anthony Alfredo	Viking Motorsports	Chevrolet	249	0	Running	13
25	17	51	Jeremy Clements	Jeremy Clements Racing	Chevrolet	249	0	Running	14
26	10	19	Brent Crews (R)	Joe Gibbs Racing	Toyota	248	31	Running	21
27	2	2	Jesse Love	Richard Childress Racing	Chevrolet	248	15	Running	15
28	18	26	Dean Thompson	Sam Hunt Racing	Toyota	248	0	Running	9
29	38	0	Garrett Smithley	SS-Green Light Racing	Chevrolet	246	0	Running	8
30	37	55	Blake Lothian	Joey Gase Motorsports	Chevrolet	245	0	Running	7
31	36	35	Joey Gase	Joey Gase Motorsports	Chevrolet	245	0	Running	6
32	35	33	Cleetus McFarland	Richard Childress Racing	Chevrolet	244	0	Running	5
33	23	87	Austin Green	Peterson Racing	Chevrolet	243	0	Running	4
34	22	48	Patrick Staropoli (R)	Big Machine Racing	Chevrolet	242	0	Running	3
35	34	74	Dawson Cram	Mike Harmon Racing	Chevrolet	241	0	Running	2
36	33	07	Josh Bilicki	SS-Green Light Racing	Chevrolet	241	0	Running	1
37	21	28	Kyle Sieg	RSS Racing	Chevrolet	201	0	Electrical	1
38	7	41	Sam Mayer	Haas Factory Team	Chevrolet	154	0	Engine	1
Official race results

=== Race statistics ===
- Lead changes: 8 among 6 different drivers
- Cautions/Laps: 7 for 44 laps
- Red flags: 0
- Time of race: 2 hours, 22 minutes and 36 seconds
- Average speed: 98.878 miles per hour (159.129 km/h)

== Standings after the race ==
Drivers' Championship standings

	Pos	Driver	Points
	1	Justin Allgaier	422
	2	Jesse Love	296 (–126)
	3	Sheldon Creed	291 (–131)
	4	Austin Hill	277 (–145)
2	5	Corey Day	272 (–150)
1	6	Carson Kvapil	267 (–155)
1	7	Sammy Smith	260 (–162)
	8	Brandon Jones	247 (–175)
	9	Parker Retzlaff	229 (–193)
	10	Rajah Caruth	215 (–207)
3	11	William Sawalich	214 (–208)
	12	Taylor Gray	203 (–219)
Official driver's standings

Manufacturers' Championship standings

Pos	Manufacturer	Points
1	Chevrolet	419
2	Toyota	247 (–172)
3	Ford	143 (–276)

- Note: Only the first 12 positions are included for the driver standings.

Previous race: 2026 NFPA 250	NASCAR O'Reilly Auto Parts Series; 2026 season	Next race: 2026 Suburban Propane 300
