= Blake Lothian =

American racing driver (born 2002)

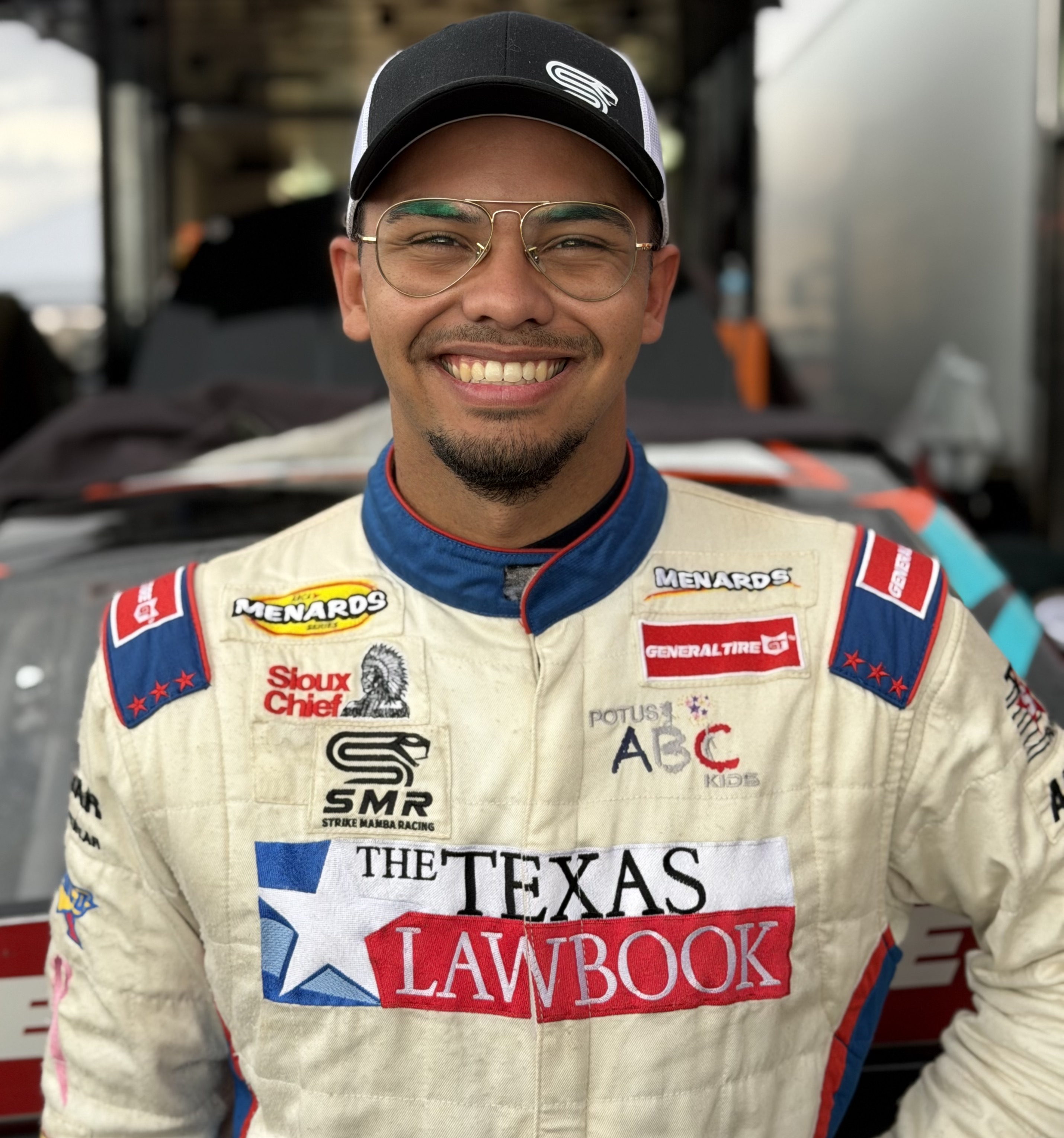
- Lothian at Las Vegas Motor Speedway in 2025
- Born: Blake D. Lothian; July 26, 2002 (age 24); Wellesley, Massachusetts, U.S.

NASCAR O'Reilly Auto Parts Series career
- 6 races run over 1 year
- 2026 position: 49th
- Best finish: 49th (2026)
- First race: 2026 North Carolina Education Lottery 250 (Rockingham)
- Last race: 2026 Focused Health 302 (Las Vegas)
Wins	Top tens	Poles
0	0	0

NASCAR FedEx Freight Truck Series career
- 4 races run over 3 years
- 2025 position: 59th
- Best finish: 59th (2025)
- First race: 2022 Blue-Emu Maximum Pain Relief 200 (Martinsville)
- Last race: 2025 EJP 175 (New Hampshire)
Wins	Top tens	Poles
0	0	0

ARCA Menards Series career
- 1 race run over 1 year
- Best finish: 115th (2025)
- First race: 2025 General Tire 150 (Phoenix)
Wins	Top tens	Poles
0	0	0

ARCA Menards Series West career
- 12 races run over 1 year
- Best finish: 5th (2025)
- First race: 2025 West Coast Stock Car Motorsports Hall of Fame 150 (Kern County)
- Last race: 2025 Desert Diamond Casino West Valley 100 (Phoenix)
Wins	Top tens	Poles
0	7	0
- Statistics up to date as of November 7, 2026.

Blake D. Lothian (born July 26, 2002) is an American professional stock car racing driver. He last competed part-time in the NASCAR O'Reilly Auto Parts Series, driving the No. 35 Toyota GR Supra for Joey Gase Motorsports with Scott Osteen. He has previously competed in the NASCAR Craftsman Truck Series and the ARCA Menards Series West.

== Racing career ==
=== Early career ===
Lothian would get his start in racing at the age of five, racing go-karts.

From 2014 to 2017, Lothian raced in the F1 Boston Series, eventually winning the championship in 2017. In the same year, he would also win the Summer 2017 New Hampshire Karting Association Series Championship.

In 2019, Lothian would spend the majority of races driving for Rev Racing, driving legend cars.

=== ARCA Menards Series ===
In 2022, Lothian would participate in an ARCA Menards Series testing session for Mullins Racing.

=== ARCA Menards Series West ===
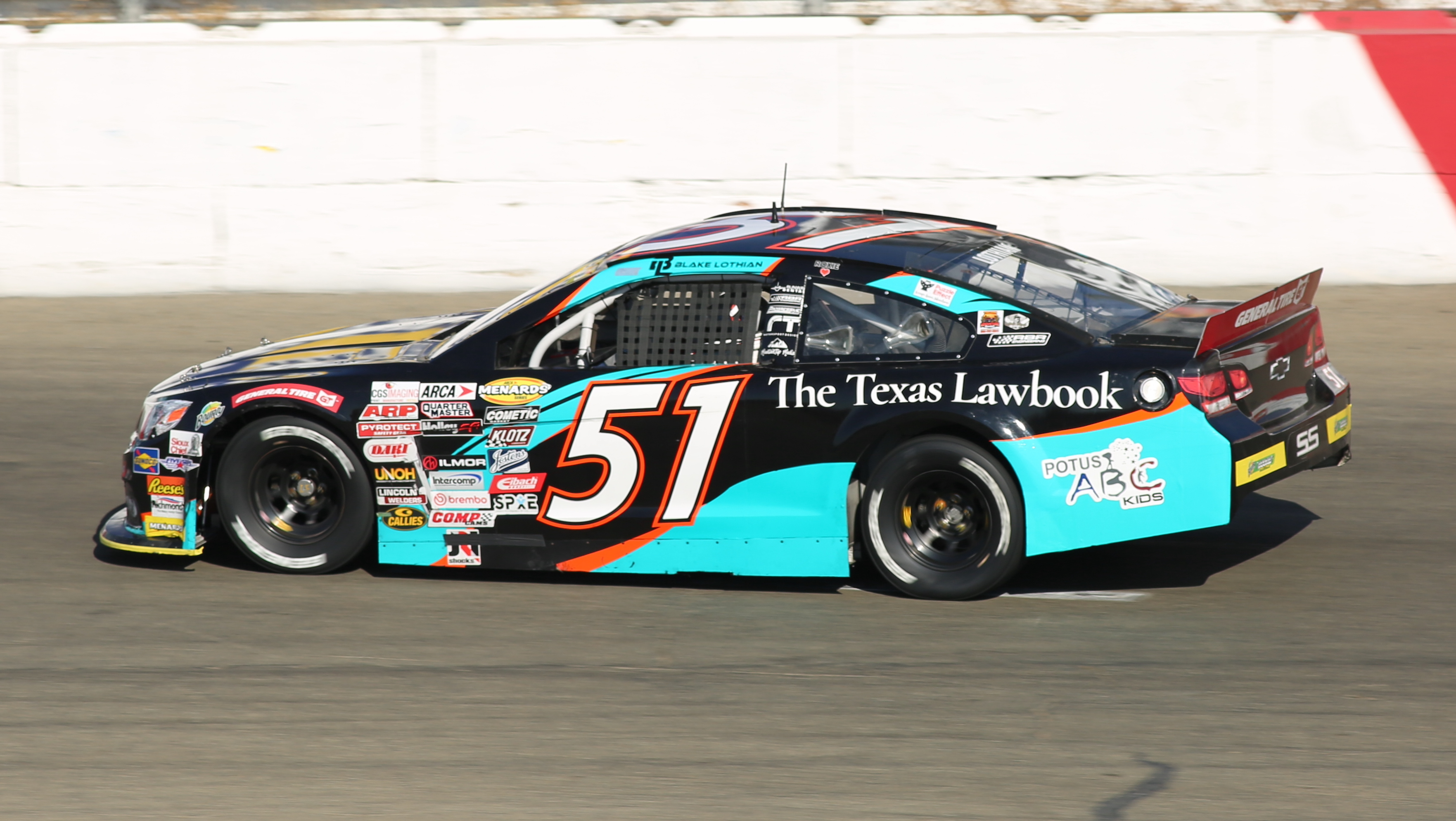
Lothian's No. 51 car at All American Speedway in 2025

On December 1, 2024, it was revealed that Lothian would compete in the ARCA Menards Series West full-time in 2025, driving the No. 51 Chevrolet for the new team Strike Mamba Racing.

=== NASCAR ===
In 2019, Lothian was announced as one of eight drivers in the NASCAR Drive for Diversity Youth Driver Development Program.

=== Craftsman Truck Series ===
==== 2022 ====
On April 4, 2022, it was announced that Lothian would make his NASCAR Camping World Truck Series debut in the No. 43 truck for Reaume Brothers Racing at Martinsville Speedway. He finished 28th in his debut. He would return to the team for the race at Gateway, where he did not make the race. He would then run the race at IRP for the team, finishing 35th after driveshaft issues.

==== 2024 ====
In 2024, Lothian returned to the NASCAR Craftsman Truck Series at Martinsville again, this time with Young's Motorsports. He would only complete 17 laps before falling out with overheating issues, finishing last in 34th. Lothian was originally scheduled to attempt the truck race at Milwaukee for Floridian Motorsports, although he would be replaced by Jayson Alexander days after the entry list was released.

==== 2025 ====
On September 4, 2025, it was announced that Lothian would return to the series with RBR at New Hampshire.

=== O'Reilly Auto Parts Series ===
==== 2026 ====
On February 5, 2026, it was announced Lothian would participate in the NASCAR O'Reilly Auto Parts Series preseason test at Rockingham with Joey Gase Motorsports.

== Personal life ==
Lothian, in an interview with the West Georgian, revealed he has Attention deficit hyperactivity disorder (ADHD). His favorite NASCAR driver is Michael McDowell. He graduated in the Class of 2021 at Wellesley High School.

== Motorsports career results ==
=== Stock car career summary ===
Season	Series	Team	Races	Wins	Top 5	Top 10	Points	Position
2022	NASCAR Camping World Truck Series	Reaume Brothers Racing	2	0	0	0	11	63rd
2023	CARS Late Model Stock Car Tour	Mike Darne Racing	2	0	0	0	17	62nd
2024	NASCAR Craftsman Truck Series	Young's Motorsports	1	0	0	0	3	73rd
2025	ARCA Menards Series West	Strike Mamba Racing	12	0	0	7	535	5th
2025	ARCA Menards Series	Strike Mamba Racing	1	0	0	0	27	115th
2025	NASCAR Craftsman Truck Series	Reaume Brothers Racing	1	0	0	0	17	59th
2026	NASCAR O'Reilly Auto Parts Series	Joey Gase Motorsports with Scott Osteen	6	0	0	0	35	49th

=== NASCAR ===
(key) (Bold – Pole position awarded by qualifying time. Italics – Pole position earned by points standings or practice time. * – Most laps led.)

==== O'Reilly Auto Parts Series ====
NASCAR O'Reilly Auto Parts Series results
Year	Team	No.	Make	1	2	3	4	5	6	7	8	9	10	11	12	13	14	15	16	17	18	19	20	21	22	23	24	25	26	27	28	29	30	31	32	33	NOAPSC	Pts	Ref
2026	Joey Gase Motorsports with Scott Osteen	35	Toyota	DAY	ATL	COA	PHO; DNQ	LVS	DAR	MAR		BRI; 34																									49th	35	
2026	Joey Gase Motorsports with Scott Osteen	55	Chevy								CAR; 30																										49th	35	
2026	Joey Gase Motorsports with Scott Osteen	35	Chevy										KAN; 31	TAL	TEX	GLN																					49th	35	
2026	Joey Gase Motorsports with Scott Osteen	55	Toyota														DOV; 26	CLT	NSH	POC	COR	SON	CHI	ATL													49th	35	
2026	Joey Gase Motorsports with Scott Osteen	53	Chevy																						IND; 34	IOW	DAY	DAR	GTW	BRI	LVS; 32	CLT	PHO	TAL	MAR	HOM	49th	35	

==== Craftsman Truck Series ====
NASCAR Craftsman Truck Series results
Year	Team	No.	Make	1	2	3	4	5	6	7	8	9	10	11	12	13	14	15	16	17	18	19	20	21	22	23	24	25	NCTC	Pts	Ref
2022	Reaume Brothers Racing	43	Toyota	DAY	LVS	ATL	COA	MAR; 28	BRD	DAR	KAN	TEX	CLT	GTW; DNQ	SON	KNX	NSH	MOH	POC										63rd	11	
2022	Reaume Brothers Racing	43	Chevy																	IRP; 35	RCH	KAN	BRI	TAL	HOM	PHO			63rd	11	
2024	Young's Motorsports	20	Chevy	DAY	ATL	LVS	BRI	COA	MAR; 34	TEX	KAN	DAR	NWS	CLT	GTW	NSH	POC	IRP	RCH	MLW	BRI	KAN	TAL	HOM	MAR	PHO			73rd	3	
2025	Reaume Brothers Racing	22	Ford	DAY	ATL	LVS	HOM	MAR	BRI	CAR	TEX	KAN	NWS	CLT	NSH	MCH	POC	LRP	IRP	GLN	RCH	DAR	BRI	NHA; 20	ROV	TAL	MAR	PHO	59th	17	

^{*} Season still in progress
^{1} Ineligible for series points

=== ARCA Menards Series ===
(key) (Bold – Pole position awarded by qualifying time. Italics – Pole position earned by points standings or practice time. * – Most laps led. ** – All laps led.)

ARCA Menards Series results
Year	Team	No.	Make	1	2	3	4	5	6	7	8	9	10	11	12	13	14	15	16	17	18	19	20	AMSC	Pts	Ref
2025	Strike Mamba Racing	51	Chevy	DAY	PHO; 17	TAL	KAN	CLT	MCH	BLN	ELK	LRP	DOV	IRP	IOW	GLN	ISF	MAD	DSF	BRI	SLM	KAN	TOL	115th	27	

==== ARCA Menards Series West ====
ARCA Menards Series West results
Year	Team	No.	Make	1	2	3	4	5	6	7	8	9	10	11	12	AMSWC	Pts	Ref
2025	Strike Mamba Racing	51	Chevy	KER; 11	PHO; 17	TUC; 9	CNS; 8	KER; 9	SON; 19	TRI; 10	PIR; 17	AAS; 10	MAD; 9	LVS; 8	PHO; 16	5th	535	

=== CARS Late Model Stock Car Tour ===
(key) (Bold – Pole position awarded by qualifying time. Italics – Pole position earned by points standings or practice time. * – Most laps led. ** – All laps led.)

CARS Late Model Stock Car Tour results
Year	Team	No.	Make	1	2	3	4	5	6	7	8	9	10	11	12	13	14	15	16	CLMSCTC	Pts	Ref
2023	Mike Darne Racing	59	Chevy	SNM; 24	FLC; 26	HCY; DNQ	ACE	NWS	LGY	DOM	CRW	HCY	ACE	TCM	WKS	AAS	SBO	TCM	CRW	62nd	17	
