= 2026 Kansas Lottery 300 =

NASCAR O'Reilly Auto Parts Series race at Kansas Speedway

Race details
- Race 10 of 33 in the 2026 NASCAR O'Reilly Auto Parts Series
- Date: April 18, 2026
- Location: Kansas Speedway in Kansas City, Kansas
- Course: Permanent racing facility
- Course length: 1.5 miles (2.4 km)
- Distance: 200 laps, 300 mi (482.80 km)
- Average speed: 116.946 miles per hour (188.206 km/h)

Pole position
Driver	Carson Kvapil	JR Motorsports
- Grid positions set by competition-based formula

Most laps led
Driver	Brandon Jones	Joe Gibbs Racing
- Laps: 67

Fastest lap
Driver	Sheldon Creed	Haas Factory Team
- Time: 30.833

Winner
No. 54	Taylor Gray	Joe Gibbs Racing

Television in the United States
- Network: The CW
- Announcers: Adam Alexander, Jamie McMurray, and Parker Kligerman

Radio in the United States
- Radio: MRN
- Booth announcers: Alex Hayden, Mike Bagley, Todd Gordon, and Joey Logano
- Turn announcers: Dave Moody (1 & 2) and Tim Catafalmo (3 & 4)

The 2026 Kansas Lottery 300 was a NASCAR O'Reilly Auto Parts Series race held on Saturday, April 18, 2026, at Kansas Speedway in Kansas City, Kansas. Contested over 200 laps on the 1.5-mile (2.4 km), it was the tenth race of the 2026 NASCAR O'Reilly Auto Parts Series season, and the 26th running of the event.

In an eventful race, Taylor Gray, driving for Joe Gibbs Racing, took advantage of a late green flag pit stop and took the lead from Sheldon Creed, leading the final 48 laps to earn his second career NASCAR O'Reilly Auto Parts Series win, and his first of the season. Creed finished second, and Justin Allgaier finished third. Jesse Love and Brent Crews rounded out the top five, while William Byron, Cole Custer, Brandon Jones, Sam Mayer, and Ryan Sieg rounded out the top ten.

The race was marred by an airborne crash involving Carson Kvapil. On the first lap, Josh Bilicki and Kyle Sieg spun in turn two and brought out the first caution. Shortly after the spin, William Byron made side contact with Kvapil, causing Kvapil to lose control and hit the outside wall. Parker Retzlaff, with nowhere to go, collided with Kvapil at the same time in which he hit the wall, causing him to go airborne. The car lifted off the ground and slid for a few seconds on its roof before flipping one time and landing back on the roof. After crew members planted the car back on all four wheels, Kvapil climbed out under his own power and was released from the infield care center shortly after.

This was the second of four races for the Dash 4 Cash program. The drivers eligible for the D4C were Brent Crews, Justin Allgaier, Carson Kvapil, and Sheldon Creed, since they were the highest finishing O'Reilly Series regulars following the race at Bristol. Creed finished in second and claimed the $100,000 bonus.

== Report ==
=== Background ===
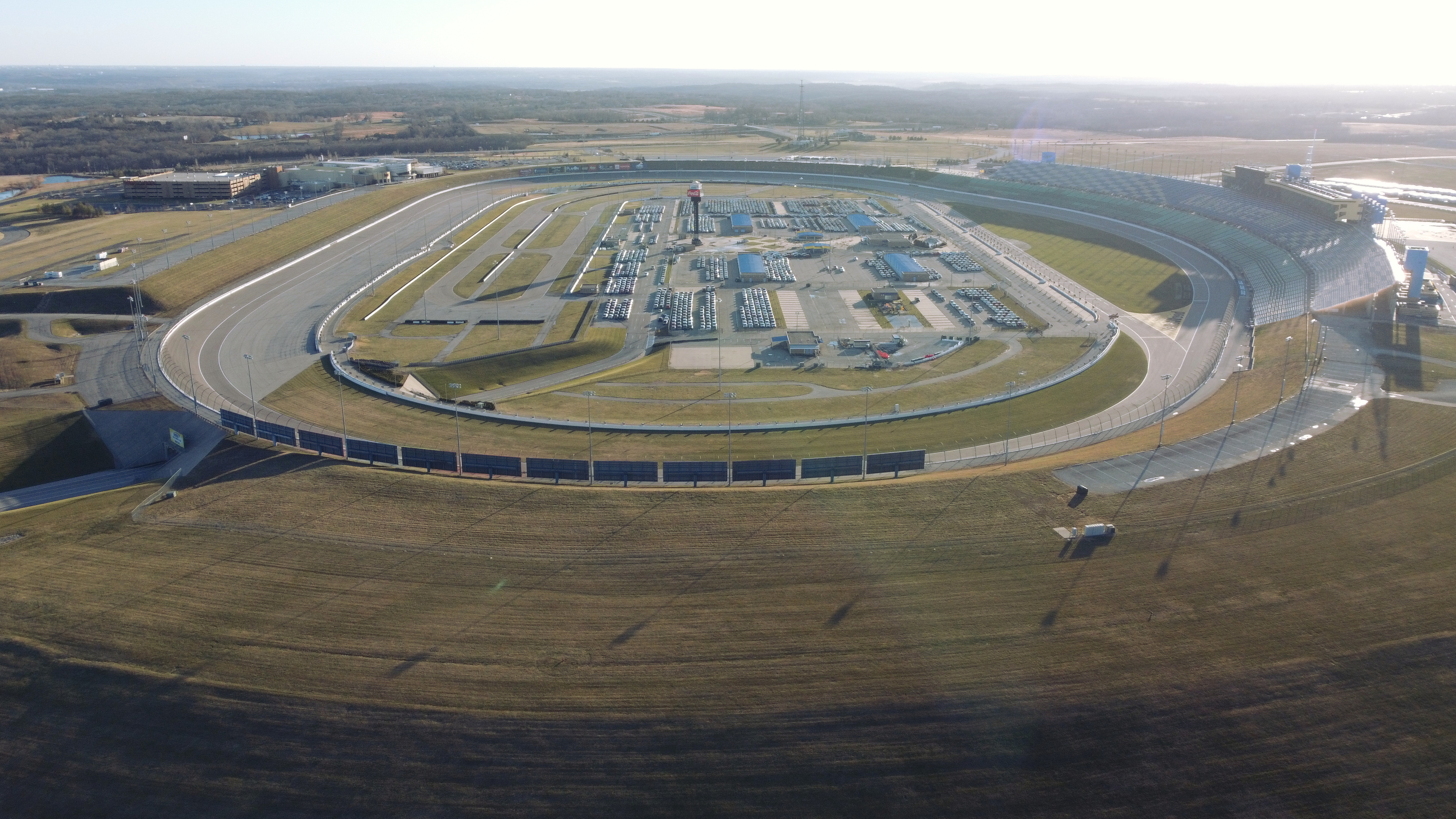
The layout of Kansas Speedway, the track where the race was held.

Kansas Speedway is a 1.5-mile (2.4 km) tri-oval race track in Kansas City, Kansas. It was built in 2001 and hosts two annual NASCAR race weekends. The NTT IndyCar Series also raced there until 2011. The speedway is owned and operated by NASCAR.

=== Entry list ===
- (R) denotes rookie driver.
- (i) denotes driver who is ineligible for series driver points.

#	Driver	Team	Make
00	Sheldon Creed	Haas Factory Team	Chevrolet
0	Cole Custer (i)	SS-Green Light Racing	Chevrolet
1	Carson Kvapil	JR Motorsports	Chevrolet
02	Ryan Ellis	Young's Motorsports	Chevrolet
2	Jesse Love	Richard Childress Racing	Chevrolet
5	Luke Baldwin (i)	Hettinger Racing	Ford
07	Josh Bilicki	SS-Green Light Racing	Chevrolet
7	Justin Allgaier	JR Motorsports	Chevrolet
8	Sammy Smith	JR Motorsports	Chevrolet
17	Corey Day	Hendrick Motorsports	Chevrolet
18	William Sawalich	Joe Gibbs Racing	Toyota
19	Brent Crews (R)	Joe Gibbs Racing	Toyota
20	Brandon Jones	Joe Gibbs Racing	Toyota
21	Austin Hill	Richard Childress Racing	Chevrolet
24	Harrison Burton	Sam Hunt Racing	Toyota
26	Dean Thompson	Sam Hunt Racing	Toyota
27	Jeb Burton	Jordan Anderson Racing	Chevrolet
28	Kyle Sieg	RSS Racing	Chevrolet
31	Blaine Perkins	Jordan Anderson Racing	Chevrolet
32	Rajah Caruth	Jordan Anderson Racing	Chevrolet
35	Blake Lothian	Joey Gase Motorsports	Chevrolet
39	Ryan Sieg	RSS Racing	Chevrolet
41	Sam Mayer	Haas Factory Team	Chevrolet
42	Nathan Byrd	Young's Motorsports	Chevrolet
44	Brennan Poole	Alpha Prime Racing	Chevrolet
45	Lavar Scott (R)	Alpha Prime Racing	Chevrolet
48	Patrick Staropoli (R)	Big Machine Racing	Chevrolet
51	Jeremy Clements	Jeremy Clements Racing	Chevrolet
54	Taylor Gray	Joe Gibbs Racing	Toyota
55	Joey Gase	Joey Gase Motorsports	Chevrolet
74	Dawson Cram	Mike Harmon Racing	Chevrolet
87	Austin Green	Peterson Racing	Chevrolet
88	William Byron (i)	JR Motorsports	Chevrolet
91	Mason Maggio	DGM Racing	Chevrolet
92	Josh Williams	DGM Racing	Chevrolet
96	Anthony Alfredo	Viking Motorsports	Chevrolet
99	Parker Retzlaff	Viking Motorsports	Chevrolet
Official entry list

== Starting lineup ==
Practice and qualifying were originally scheduled to be held on Friday, April 27, at 6:00 PM and 7:05 PM CST respectively, but were canceled due to inclement weather. Carson Kvapil, driving for JR Motorsports, was awarded his first career pole position as a result of NASCAR's pandemic formula with a score of 1.900.

=== Starting lineup ===
Pos.	#	Driver	Team	Make
1	1	Carson Kvapil	JR Motorsports	Chevrolet
2	88	William Byron (i)	JR Motorsports	Chevrolet
3	7	Justin Allgaier	JR Motorsports	Chevrolet
4	00	Sheldon Creed	Haas Factory Team	Chevrolet
5	19	Brent Crews (R)	Joe Gibbs Racing	Toyota
6	17	Corey Day	Hendrick Motorsports	Chevrolet
7	18	William Sawalich	Joe Gibbs Racing	Toyota
8	99	Parker Retzlaff	Viking Motorsports	Chevrolet
9	2	Jesse Love	Richard Childress Racing	Chevrolet
10	54	Taylor Gray	Joe Gibbs Racing	Toyota
11	8	Sammy Smith	JR Motorsports	Chevrolet
12	39	Ryan Sieg	RSS Racing	Chevrolet
13	32	Rajah Caruth	Jordan Anderson Racing	Chevrolet
14	20	Brandon Jones	Joe Gibbs Racing	Toyota
15	21	Austin Hill	Richard Childress Racing	Chevrolet
16	27	Jeb Burton	Jordan Anderson Racing	Chevrolet
17	44	Brennan Poole	Alpha Prime Racing	Chevrolet
18	51	Jeremy Clements	Jeremy Clements Racing	Chevrolet
19	41	Sam Mayer	Haas Factory Team	Chevrolet
20	24	Harrison Burton	Sam Hunt Racing	Toyota
21	31	Blaine Perkins	Jordan Anderson Racing	Chevrolet
22	26	Dean Thompson	Sam Hunt Racing	Toyota
23	07	Josh Bilicki	SS-Green Light Racing	Chevrolet
24	48	Patrick Staropoli (R)	Big Machine Racing	Chevrolet
25	28	Kyle Sieg	RSS Racing	Chevrolet
26	5	Luke Baldwin (i)	Hettinger Racing	Ford
27	45	Lavar Scott (R)	Alpha Prime Racing	Chevrolet
28	74	Dawson Cram	Mike Harmon Racing	Chevrolet
29	02	Ryan Ellis	Young's Motorsports	Chevrolet
30	92	Josh Williams	DGM Racing	Chevrolet
31	96	Anthony Alfredo	Viking Motorsports	Chevrolet
32	42	Nathan Byrd	Young's Motorsports	Chevrolet
Qualified by owner's points
33	55	Joey Gase	Joey Gase Motorsports	Chevrolet
34	91	Mason Maggio	DGM Racing	Chevrolet
35	87	Austin Green	Peterson Racing	Chevrolet
36	0	Cole Custer (i)	SS-Green Light Racing	Chevrolet
37	35	Blake Lothian	Joey Gase Motorsports	Chevrolet
Official starting lineup

== Race ==
=== Race results ===
==== Stage results ====
Stage One Laps: 45

Pos.	#	Driver	Team	Make	Pts
1	20	Brandon Jones	Joe Gibbs Racing	Toyota	10
2	17	Corey Day	Hendrick Motorsports	Chevrolet	9
3	7	Justin Allgaier	JR Motorsports	Chevrolet	8
4	2	Jesse Love	Richard Childress Racing	Chevrolet	7
5	96	Anthony Alfredo	Viking Motorsports	Chevrolet	6
6	54	Taylor Gray	Joe Gibbs Racing	Toyota	5
7	00	Sheldon Creed	Haas Factory Team	Chevrolet	4
8	19	Brent Crews (R)	Joe Gibbs Racing	Toyota	3
9	27	Jeb Burton	Jordan Anderson Racing	Chevrolet	2
10	88	William Byron (i)	JR Motorsports	Chevrolet	0

Stage Two Laps: 45

Pos.	#	Driver	Team	Make	Pts
1	20	Brandon Jones	Joe Gibbs Racing	Toyota	10
2	00	Sheldon Creed	Haas Factory Team	Chevrolet	9
3	7	Justin Allgaier	JR Motorsports	Chevrolet	8
4	2	Jesse Love	Richard Childress Racing	Chevrolet	7
5	17	Corey Day	Hendrick Motorsports	Chevrolet	6
6	8	Sammy Smith	JR Motorsports	Chevrolet	5
7	54	Taylor Gray	Joe Gibbs Racing	Toyota	4
8	24	Harrison Burton	Sam Hunt Racing	Toyota	3
9	41	Sam Mayer	Haas Factory Team	Chevrolet	2
10	26	Dean Thompson	Sam Hunt Racing	Toyota	1

=== Final Stage results ===
Stage Three Laps: 110

Fin	St	#	Driver	Team	Make	Laps	Led	Status	Pts
1	10	54	Taylor Gray	Joe Gibbs Racing	Toyota	200	48	Running	64
2	4	00	Sheldon Creed	Haas Factory Team	Chevrolet	200	48	Running	49
3	3	7	Justin Allgaier	JR Motorsports	Chevrolet	200	0	Running	50
4	9	2	Jesse Love	Richard Childress Racing	Chevrolet	200	1	Running	47
5	5	19	Brent Crews (R)	Joe Gibbs Racing	Toyota	200	0	Running	35
6	2	88	William Byron (i)	JR Motorsports	Chevrolet	200	1	Running	0
7	36	0	Cole Custer (i)	SS-Green Light Racing	Chevrolet	200	0	Running	0
8	14	20	Brandon Jones	Joe Gibbs Racing	Toyota	200	67	Running	49
9	19	41	Sam Mayer	Haas Factory Team	Chevrolet	200	0	Running	30
10	12	39	Ryan Sieg	RSS Racing	Chevrolet	200	3	Running	27
11	22	26	Dean Thompson	Sam Hunt Racing	Toyota	199	0	Running	27
12	6	17	Corey Day	Hendrick Motorsports	Chevrolet	199	26	Running	40
13	16	27	Jeb Burton	Jordan Anderson Racing	Chevrolet	199	0	Running	26
14	24	48	Patrick Staropoli (R)	Big Machine Racing	Chevrolet	199	0	Running	23
15	18	51	Jeremy Clements	Jeremy Clements Racing	Chevrolet	199	0	Running	22
16	11	8	Sammy Smith	JR Motorsports	Chevrolet	199	0	Running	26
17	30	92	Josh Williams	DGM Racing	Chevrolet	199	0	Running	20
18	27	45	Lavar Scott (R)	Alpha Prime Racing	Chevrolet	198	0	Running	19
19	17	44	Brennan Poole	Alpha Prime Racing	Chevrolet	198	0	Running	18
20	7	18	William Sawalich	Joe Gibbs Racing	Toyota	198	0	Running	17
21	13	32	Rajah Caruth	Jordan Anderson Racing	Chevrolet	198	0	Running	16
22	29	02	Ryan Ellis	Young's Motorsports	Chevrolet	198	0	Running	15
23	21	31	Blaine Perkins	Jordan Anderson Racing	Chevrolet	198	0	Running	14
24	32	42	Nathan Byrd	Young's Motorsports	Chevrolet	197	0	Running	13
25	25	28	Kyle Sieg	RSS Racing	Chevrolet	197	0	Running	12
26	23	07	Josh Bilicki	SS-Green Light Racing	Chevrolet	196	0	Running	11
27	33	55	Joey Gase	Joey Gase Motorsports	Chevrolet	194	0	Running	10
28	20	24	Harrison Burton	Sam Hunt Racing	Toyota	190	0	Running	12
29	28	74	Dawson Cram	Mike Harmon Racing	Chevrolet	120	0	Engine	8
30	31	96	Anthony Alfredo	Viking Motorsports	Chevrolet	65	6	Accident	13
31	37	35	Blake Lothian	Joey Gase Motorsports	Chevrolet	62	0	Brakes	6
32	35	87	Austin Green	Peterson Racing	Chevrolet	61	0	Engine	5
33	34	91	Mason Maggio	DGM Racing	Chevrolet	51	0	Engine	4
34	15	21	Austin Hill	Richard Childress Racing	Chevrolet	37	0	Accident	3
35	26	5	Luke Baldwin (i)	Hettinger Racing	Ford	4	0	Suspension	0
36	8	99	Parker Retzlaff	Viking Motorsports	Chevrolet	2	0	Accident	1
37	1	1	Carson Kvapil	JR Motorsports	Chevrolet	1	0	Accident	1
Official race results

=== Race statistics ===
- Lead changes: 11 among 8 different drivers
- Cautions/Laps: 7 for 37 laps
- Red flags: 1
- Time of race: 2 hours, 33 minutes and 55 seconds
- Average speed: 116.946 miles per hour (188.206 km/h)

== Standings after the race ==
Drivers' Championship standings

	Pos	Driver	Points
	1	Justin Allgaier	520
	2	Sheldon Creed	389 (–131)
	3	Jesse Love	371 (–149)
	4	Corey Day	344 (–176)
3	5	Brandon Jones	324 (–196)
1	6	Sammy Smith	310 (–210)
2	7	Carson Kvapil	301 (–219)
2	8	Austin Hill	296 (–224)
3	9	Taylor Gray	294 (–226)
	10	William Sawalich	271 (–249)
2	11	Parker Retzlaff	258 (–262)
1	12	Rajah Caruth	254 (–266)
Official driver's standings

Manufacturers' Championship standings

Pos	Manufacturer	Points
1	Chevrolet	509
2	Toyota	336 (–173)
3	Ford	156 (–353)

- Note: Only the first 12 positions are included for the driver standings.

Previous race: 2026 Suburban Propane 300	NASCAR O'Reilly Auto Parts Series; 2026 season	Next race: 2026 Ag-Pro 300
