= 2026 Suburban Propane 300 =

NASCAR O'Reilly Auto Parts Series race at Bristol Motor Speedway

Race details
- Race 9 of 33 in the 2026 NASCAR O'Reilly Auto Parts Series
- Date: April 11, 2026
- Location: Bristol Motor Speedway in Bristol, Tennessee
- Course: Permanent racing facility
- Course length: 0.533 miles (0.858 km)
- Distance: 300 laps, 159.9 mi (257.33 km)
- Average speed: 77.884 miles per hour (125.342 km/h)

Pole position
| Driver | William Sawalich | Joe Gibbs Racing |
- Time: 15.634

Most laps led
| Driver | Kyle Larson | JR Motorsports |
- Laps: 230

Fastest lap
| Driver | Brent Crews | Joe Gibbs Racing |
- Time: 16.012

Winner
| No. 1 | Connor Zilisch | JR Motorsports |

Television in the United States
- Network: The CW
- Announcers: Dillion Welch, Jamie McMurray, and Parker Kligerman

Radio in the United States
- Radio: PRN
- Booth announcers: Brad Gillie and Nick Yeoman
- Turn announcers: Pat Patterson (Backstretch)

The 2026 Suburban Propane 300 was a NASCAR O'Reilly Auto Parts Series race held on Saturday, April 11, 2026, at Bristol Motor Speedway in Bristol, Tennessee. Contested over 300 laps on the 0.533-mile-long asphalt oval, it was the ninth race of the 2026 NASCAR O'Reilly Auto Parts Series season, and the second running of the event.

Connor Zilisch, driving for JR Motorsports, made a successful pit strategy by staying out on older tires with 28 laps to go, and held off a dominant Kyle Larson in the final six laps to earn his 12th career NASCAR O'Reilly Auto Parts Series win, and his first of the season. Larson swept both stages and led a race-high 230 laps but was unable to get past Zilisch in the final laps and settled for second. Brent Crews finished third, while Justin Allgaier and Carson Kvapil rounded out the top five. Sheldon Creed, William Sawalich, Corey Day, Parker Retzlaff, and Taylor Gray rounded out the top ten.

This was the first of four races for the Dash 4 Cash program. The drivers eligible for the D4C were William Sawalich, Brandon Jones, Justin Allgaier, and Rajah Caruth, since they were the highest finishing O'Reilly Series regulars following the race at Rockingham. Allgaier finished in fourth and claimed the $100,000 bonus.

== Report ==
=== Background ===
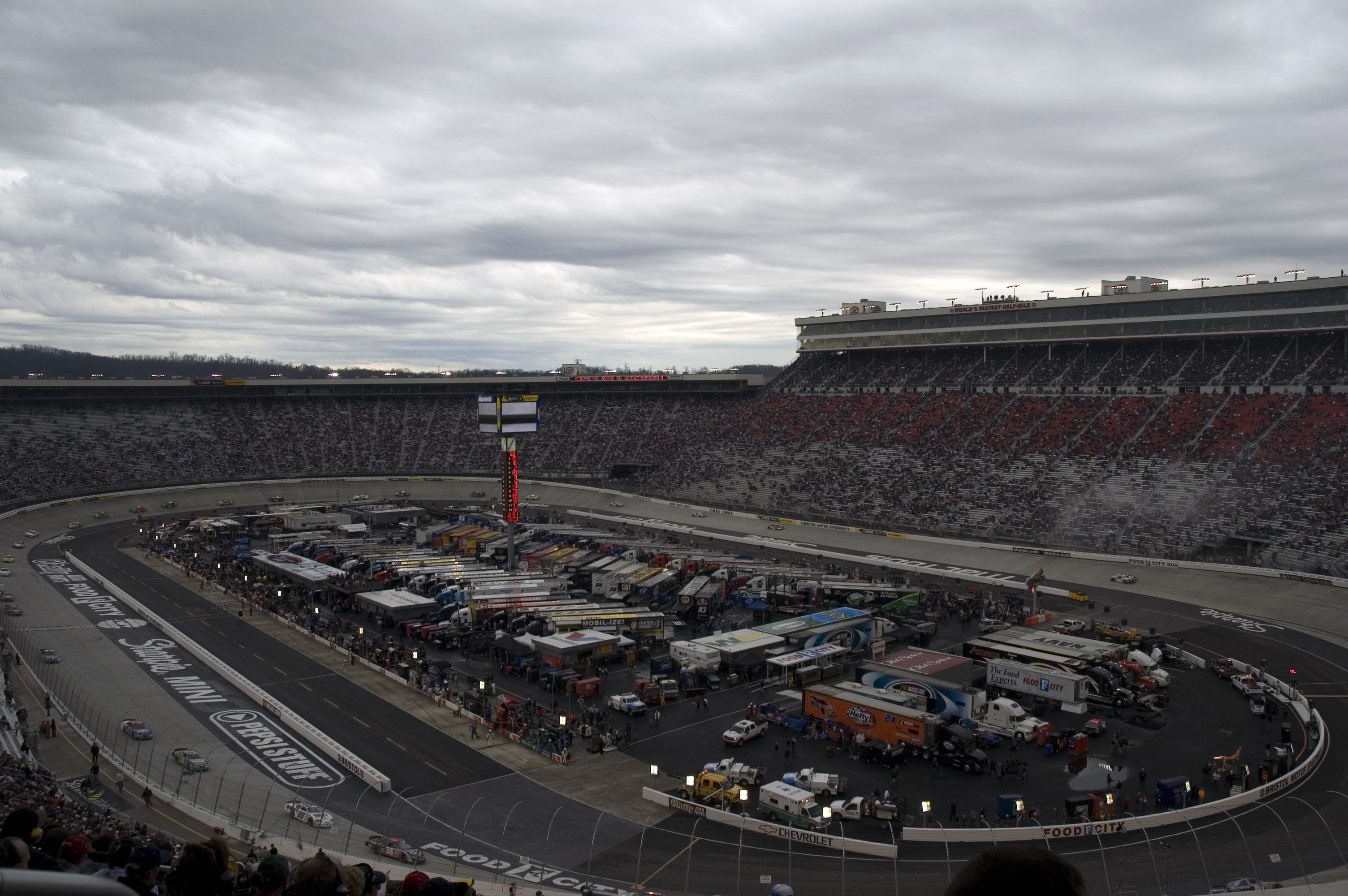
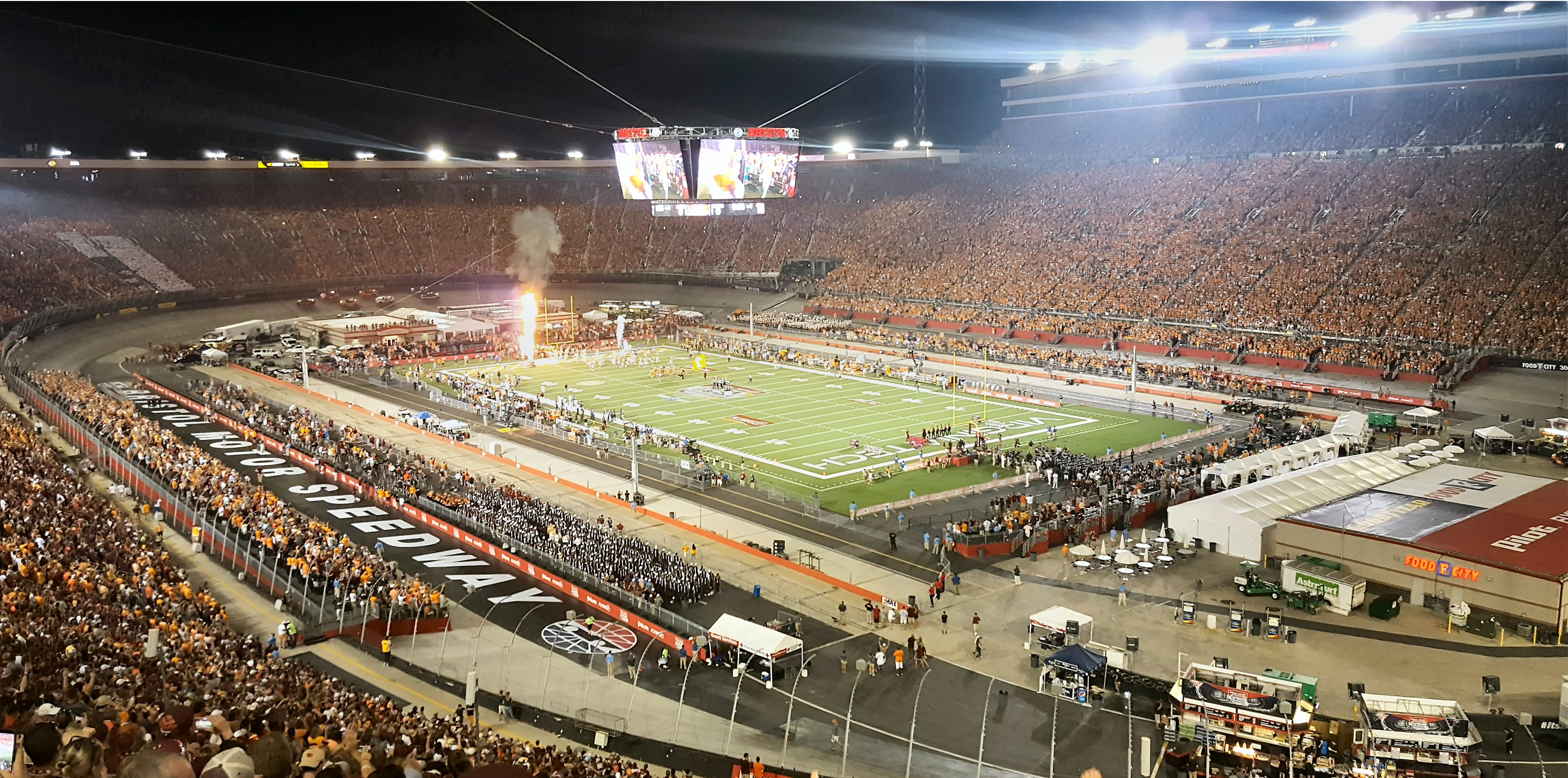
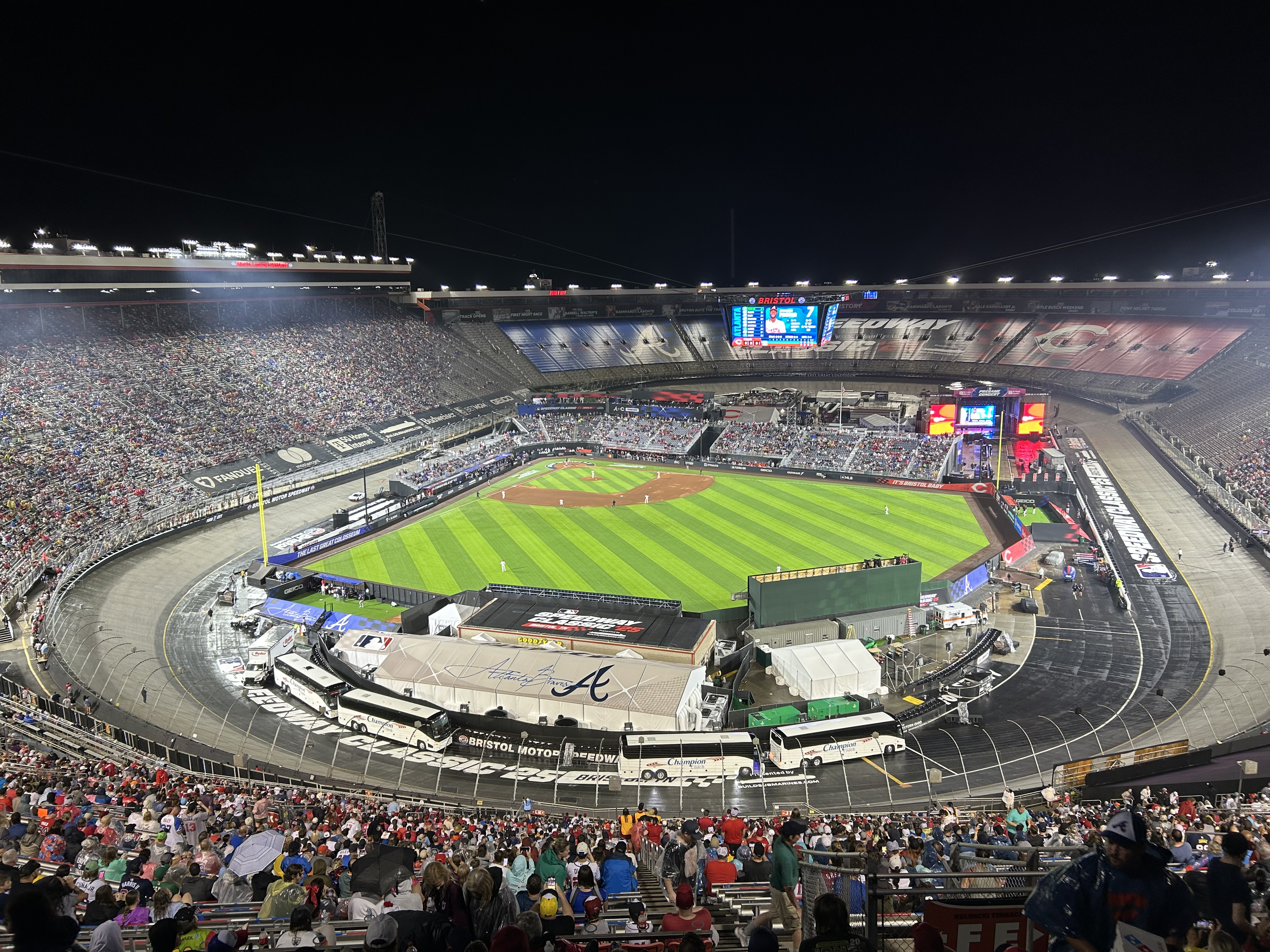
The Track (left) the Battle at Bristol (center) and the MLB Speedway Classic (right), are all events previously held at Bristol Motor Speedway.

The Bristol Motor Speedway, formerly known as Bristol International Raceway and Bristol Raceway, is a NASCAR short track venue located in Bristol, Tennessee. Constructed in 1960, it held its first NASCAR race on July 30, 1961. Despite its short length, Bristol is among the most popular tracks on the NASCAR schedule because of its distinct features, which include extraordinarily steep banking, an all-concrete surface, two pit roads, and stadium-like seating. It has also been named one of the loudest NASCAR tracks.

Besides holding racing events, the track has hosted the Battle at Bristol, a college football game between the Tennessee Volunteers and the Virginia Tech Hokies on September 10, 2016, and the MLB Speedway Classic, an MLB baseball game between the Atlanta Braves and the Cincinnati Reds from August 2-3, 2025.

Suburban Propane was announced as the title sponsor on February 24.

=== Entry list ===
- (R) denotes rookie driver.
- (i) denotes driver who is ineligible for series driver points.

| # | Driver | Team | Make |
|---|---|---|---|
| 00 | Sheldon Creed | Haas Factory Team | Chevrolet |
| 0 | Garrett Smithley | SS-Green Light Racing | Chevrolet |
| 1 | Connor Zilisch (i) | JR Motorsports | Chevrolet |
| 02 | Ryan Ellis | Young's Motorsports | Chevrolet |
| 2 | Jesse Love | Richard Childress Racing | Chevrolet |
| 5 | J. J. Yeley | Hettinger Racing | Ford |
| 07 | Josh Bilicki | SS-Green Light Racing | Chevrolet |
| 7 | Justin Allgaier | JR Motorsports | Chevrolet |
| 8 | Sammy Smith | JR Motorsports | Chevrolet |
| 9 | Carson Kvapil | JR Motorsports | Chevrolet |
| 17 | Corey Day | Hendrick Motorsports | Chevrolet |
| 18 | William Sawalich | Joe Gibbs Racing | Toyota |
| 19 | Brent Crews (R) | Joe Gibbs Racing | Toyota |
| 20 | Brandon Jones | Joe Gibbs Racing | Toyota |
| 21 | Austin Hill | Richard Childress Racing | Chevrolet |
| 24 | Harrison Burton | Sam Hunt Racing | Toyota |
| 26 | Dean Thompson | Sam Hunt Racing | Toyota |
| 27 | Jeb Burton | Jordan Anderson Racing | Chevrolet |
| 28 | Kyle Sieg | RSS Racing | Chevrolet |
| 31 | Blaine Perkins | Jordan Anderson Racing | Chevrolet |
| 32 | Rajah Caruth | Jordan Anderson Racing | Chevrolet |
| 35 | Blake Lothian | Joey Gase Motorsports | Toyota |
| 39 | Ryan Sieg | RSS Racing | Chevrolet |
| 41 | Sam Mayer | Haas Factory Team | Chevrolet |
| 42 | Logan Bearden | Young's Motorsports | Chevrolet |
| 44 | Brennan Poole | Alpha Prime Racing | Chevrolet |
| 45 | Lavar Scott (R) | Alpha Prime Racing | Chevrolet |
| 48 | Patrick Staropoli (R) | Big Machine Racing | Chevrolet |
| 51 | Jeremy Clements | Jeremy Clements Racing | Chevrolet |
| 54 | Taylor Gray | Joe Gibbs Racing | Toyota |
| 55 | Joey Gase | Joey Gase Motorsports | Chevrolet |
| 74 | Gray Gaulding | Mike Harmon Racing | Chevrolet |
| 87 | Austin Green | Peterson Racing | Chevrolet |
| 88 | Kyle Larson (i) | JR Motorsports | Chevrolet |
| 91 | Mason Maggio | DGM Racing | Chevrolet |
| 92 | Josh Williams | DGM Racing | Chevrolet |
| 96 | Anthony Alfredo | Viking Motorsports | Chevrolet |
| 99 | Parker Retzlaff | Viking Motorsports | Chevrolet |
Official entry list

== Practice ==
The first and only practice session was held on Saturday, April 11, at 2:00 PM EST, and lasted for 50 minutes.

Taylor Gray, driving for Joe Gibbs Racing, set the fastest time in the session, with a lap of 15.746 seconds, and a speed of 121.860 miles per hour (196.115 km/h).

=== Practice results ===
| Pos. | # | Driver | Team | Make | Time | Speed |
|---|---|---|---|---|---|---|
| 1 | 54 | Taylor Gray | Joe Gibbs Racing | Toyota | 15.746 | 121.860 |
| 2 | 20 | Brandon Jones | Joe Gibbs Racing | Toyota | 15.774 | 121.643 |
| 3 | 88 | Kyle Larson (i) | JR Motorsports | Chevrolet | 15.817 | 121.313 |
Full practice results

== Qualifying ==
Qualifying was held on Saturday, April 11, at 3:05 PM EST. Since Bristol Motor Speedway is a short track, the qualifying procedure used was a single-car, two-lap system with one round. Drivers were on track by themselves and had two laps to post a qualifying time, and whoever set the fastest time won the pole.

William Sawalich, driving for Joe Gibbs Racing, qualified on pole position with a lap of 15.634 seconds, and a speed of 122.733 miles per hour (197.520 km/h).

No drivers failed to qualify.

=== Qualifying results ===
| Pos. | # | Driver | Team | Make | Time | Speed |
|---|---|---|---|---|---|---|
| 1 | 18 | William Sawalich | Joe Gibbs Racing | Toyota | 15.634 | 122.733 |
| 2 | 00 | Sheldon Creed | Haas Factory Team | Chevrolet | 15.676 | 122.404 |
| 3 | 88 | Kyle Larson (i) | JR Motorsports | Chevrolet | 15.709 | 122.147 |
| 4 | 20 | Brandon Jones | Joe Gibbs Racing | Toyota | 15.757 | 121.774 |
| 5 | 41 | Sam Mayer | Haas Factory Team | Chevrolet | 15.769 | 121.682 |
| 6 | 54 | Taylor Gray | Joe Gibbs Racing | Toyota | 15.786 | 121.551 |
| 7 | 7 | Justin Allgaier | JR Motorsports | Chevrolet | 15.802 | 121.428 |
| 8 | 9 | Carson Kvapil | JR Motorsports | Chevrolet | 15.816 | 121.320 |
| 9 | 99 | Parker Retzlaff | Viking Motorsports | Chevrolet | 15.829 | 121.221 |
| 10 | 44 | Brennan Poole | Alpha Prime Racing | Chevrolet | 15.830 | 121.213 |
| 11 | 39 | Ryan Sieg | RSS Racing | Chevrolet | 15.831 | 121.205 |
| 12 | 2 | Jesse Love | Richard Childress Racing | Chevrolet | 15.851 | 121.052 |
| 13 | 27 | Jeb Burton | Jordan Anderson Racing | Chevrolet | 15.852 | 121.045 |
| 14 | 17 | Corey Day | Hendrick Motorsports | Chevrolet | 15.853 | 121.037 |
| 15 | 1 | Connor Zilisch (i) | JR Motorsports | Chevrolet | 15.859 | 120.991 |
| 16 | 8 | Sammy Smith | JR Motorsports | Chevrolet | 15.864 | 120.953 |
| 17 | 19 | Brent Crews (R) | Joe Gibbs Racing | Toyota | 15.892 | 120.740 |
| 18 | 96 | Anthony Alfredo | Viking Motorsports | Chevrolet | 15.948 | 120.316 |
| 19 | 51 | Jeremy Clements | Jeremy Clements Racing | Chevrolet | 15.949 | 120.308 |
| 20 | 28 | Kyle Sieg | RSS Racing | Chevrolet | 15.959 | 120.233 |
| 21 | 26 | Dean Thompson | Sam Hunt Racing | Toyota | 15.984 | 120.045 |
| 22 | 24 | Harrison Burton | Sam Hunt Racing | Toyota | 15.998 | 119.940 |
| 23 | 21 | Austin Hill | Richard Childress Racing | Chevrolet | 16.076 | 119.358 |
| 24 | 42 | Logan Bearden | Young's Motorsports | Chevrolet | 16.087 | 119.276 |
| 25 | 87 | Austin Green | Peterson Racing | Chevrolet | 16.102 | 119.165 |
| 26 | 45 | Lavar Scott (R) | Alpha Prime Racing | Chevrolet | 16.124 | 119.003 |
| 27 | 07 | Josh Bilicki | SS-Green Light Racing | Chevrolet | 16.139 | 118.892 |
| 28 | 74 | Gray Gaulding | Mike Harmon Racing | Chevrolet | 16.142 | 118.870 |
| 29 | 92 | Josh Williams | DGM Racing | Chevrolet | 16.151 | 118.804 |
| 30 | 31 | Blaine Perkins | Jordan Anderson Racing | Chevrolet | 16.153 | 118.789 |
| 31 | 91 | Mason Maggio | DGM Racing | Chevrolet | 16.175 | 118.628 |
| 32 | 48 | Patrick Staropoli (R) | Big Machine Racing | Chevrolet | 16.283 | 117.841 |
Qualified by owner's points
| 33 | 02 | Ryan Ellis | Young's Motorsports | Chevrolet | 16.286 | 117.819 |
| 34 | 5 | J. J. Yeley | Hettinger Racing | Ford | 16.287 | 117.812 |
| 35 | 0 | Garrett Smithley | SS-Green Light Racing | Chevrolet | 16.427 | 116.808 |
| 36 | 55 | Joey Gase | Joey Gase Motorsports | Chevrolet | 16.619 | 115.458 |
| 37 | 35 | Blake Lothian | Joey Gase Motorsports | Toyota | 16.926 | 113.364 |
| 38 | 32 | Rajah Caruth | Jordan Anderson Racing | Chevrolet | — | — |
Official qualifying results
Official starting lineup

== Race ==
=== Race results ===
==== Stage Results ====
Stage One Laps: 85

| Pos. | # | Driver | Team | Make | Pts |
|---|---|---|---|---|---|
| 1 | 88 | Kyle Larson (i) | JR Motorsports | Chevrolet | 0 |
| 2 | 00 | Sheldon Creed | Haas Factory Team | Chevrolet | 9 |
| 3 | 39 | Ryan Sieg | RSS Racing | Chevrolet | 8 |
| 4 | 7 | Justin Allgaier | JR Motorsports | Chevrolet | 7 |
| 5 | 20 | Brandon Jones | Joe Gibbs Racing | Toyota | 6 |
| 6 | 18 | William Sawalich | Joe Gibbs Racing | Toyota | 5 |
| 7 | 1 | Connor Zilisch (i) | JR Motorsports | Chevrolet | 0 |
| 8 | 2 | Jesse Love | Richard Childress Racing | Chevrolet | 3 |
| 9 | 41 | Sam Mayer | Haas Factory Team | Chevrolet | 2 |
| 10 | 17 | Corey Day | Hendrick Motorsports | Chevrolet | 1 |

Stage Two Laps: 85

| Pos. | # | Driver | Team | Make | Pts |
|---|---|---|---|---|---|
| 1 | 88 | Kyle Larson (i) | JR Motorsports | Chevrolet | 0 |
| 2 | 00 | Sheldon Creed | Haas Factory Team | Chevrolet | 9 |
| 3 | 7 | Justin Allgaier | JR Motorsports | Chevrolet | 8 |
| 4 | 1 | Connor Zilisch (i) | JR Motorsports | Chevrolet | 0 |
| 5 | 19 | Brent Crews (R) | Joe Gibbs Racing | Toyota | 6 |
| 6 | 18 | William Sawalich | Joe Gibbs Racing | Toyota | 5 |
| 7 | 20 | Brandon Jones | Joe Gibbs Racing | Toyota | 4 |
| 8 | 41 | Sam Mayer | Haas Factory Team | Chevrolet | 3 |
| 9 | 17 | Corey Day | Hendrick Motorsports | Chevrolet | 2 |
| 10 | 9 | Carson Kvapil | JR Motorsports | Chevrolet | 1 |

=== Final Stage results ===
Stage Three Laps: 130

| Fin | St | # | Driver | Team | Make | Laps | Led | Status | Pts |
|---|---|---|---|---|---|---|---|---|---|
| 1 | 15 | 1 | Connor Zilisch (i) | JR Motorsports | Chevrolet | 300 | 24 | Running | 0 |
| 2 | 3 | 88 | Kyle Larson (i) | JR Motorsports | Chevrolet | 300 | 230 | Running | 0 |
| 3 | 17 | 19 | Brent Crews (R) | Joe Gibbs Racing | Toyota | 300 | 3 | Running | 41 |
| 4 | 7 | 7 | Justin Allgaier | JR Motorsports | Chevrolet | 300 | 0 | Running | 48 |
| 5 | 8 | 9 | Carson Kvapil | JR Motorsports | Chevrolet | 300 | 0 | Running | 33 |
| 6 | 2 | 00 | Sheldon Creed | Haas Factory Team | Chevrolet | 300 | 0 | Running | 49 |
| 7 | 1 | 18 | William Sawalich | Joe Gibbs Racing | Toyota | 300 | 27 | Running | 40 |
| 8 | 14 | 17 | Corey Day | Hendrick Motorsports | Chevrolet | 300 | 0 | Running | 32 |
| 9 | 9 | 99 | Parker Retzlaff | Viking Motorsports | Chevrolet | 300 | 0 | Running | 28 |
| 10 | 6 | 54 | Taylor Gray | Joe Gibbs Racing | Toyota | 300 | 0 | Running | 27 |
| 11 | 11 | 39 | Ryan Sieg | RSS Racing | Chevrolet | 300 | 13 | Running | 34 |
| 12 | 12 | 2 | Jesse Love | Richard Childress Racing | Chevrolet | 300 | 0 | Running | 28 |
| 13 | 16 | 8 | Sammy Smith | JR Motorsports | Chevrolet | 300 | 0 | Running | 24 |
| 14 | 38 | 32 | Rajah Caruth | Jordan Anderson Racing | Chevrolet | 300 | 0 | Running | 23 |
| 15 | 19 | 51 | Jeremy Clements | Jeremy Clements Racing | Chevrolet | 300 | 1 | Running | 22 |
| 16 | 13 | 27 | Jeb Burton | Jordan Anderson Racing | Chevrolet | 300 | 0 | Running | 21 |
| 17 | 22 | 24 | Harrison Burton | Sam Hunt Racing | Toyota | 300 | 0 | Running | 20 |
| 18 | 10 | 44 | Brennan Poole | Alpha Prime Racing | Chevrolet | 300 | 0 | Running | 19 |
| 19 | 4 | 20 | Brandon Jones | Joe Gibbs Racing | Toyota | 300 | 2 | Running | 28 |
| 20 | 5 | 41 | Sam Mayer | Haas Factory Team | Chevrolet | 300 | 0 | Running | 22 |
| 21 | 23 | 21 | Austin Hill | Richard Childress Racing | Chevrolet | 300 | 0 | Running | 16 |
| 22 | 30 | 31 | Blaine Perkins | Jordan Anderson Racing | Chevrolet | 299 | 0 | Running | 15 |
| 23 | 27 | 07 | Josh Bilicki | SS-Green Light Racing | Chevrolet | 299 | 0 | Running | 14 |
| 24 | 21 | 26 | Dean Thompson | Sam Hunt Racing | Toyota | 298 | 0 | Running | 13 |
| 25 | 20 | 28 | Kyle Sieg | RSS Racing | Chevrolet | 298 | 0 | Running | 12 |
| 26 | 34 | 5 | J. J. Yeley | Hettinger Racing | Ford | 298 | 0 | Running | 11 |
| 27 | 32 | 48 | Patrick Staropoli (R) | Big Machine Racing | Chevrolet | 298 | 0 | Running | 10 |
| 28 | 28 | 74 | Gray Gaulding | Mike Harmon Racing | Chevrolet | 298 | 0 | Running | 9 |
| 29 | 29 | 92 | Josh Williams | DGM Racing | Chevrolet | 297 | 0 | Running | 8 |
| 30 | 33 | 02 | Ryan Ellis | Young's Motorsports | Chevrolet | 297 | 0 | Running | 7 |
| 31 | 36 | 55 | Joey Gase | Joey Gase Motorsports | Chevrolet | 297 | 0 | Running | 6 |
| 32 | 26 | 45 | Lavar Scott (R) | Alpha Prime Racing | Chevrolet | 295 | 0 | Running | 5 |
| 33 | 24 | 42 | Logan Bearden | Young's Motorsports | Chevrolet | 295 | 0 | Running | 4 |
| 34 | 37 | 35 | Blake Lothian | Joey Gase Motorsports | Toyota | 295 | 0 | Running | 3 |
| 35 | 25 | 87 | Austin Green | Peterson Racing | Chevrolet | 290 | 0 | Running | 2 |
| 36 | 18 | 96 | Anthony Alfredo | Viking Motorsports | Chevrolet | 287 | 0 | Running | 1 |
| 37 | 31 | 91 | Mason Maggio | DGM Racing | Chevrolet | 191 | 0 | Engine | 1 |
| 38 | 35 | 0 | Garrett Smithley | SS-Green Light Racing | Chevrolet | 176 | 0 | Suspension | 1 |
Official race results

=== Race statistics ===
- Lead changes: 13 among 7 different drivers
- Cautions/Laps: 8 for 59 laps
- Red flags: 1
- Time of race: 2 hours, 3 minutes and 11 seconds
- Average speed: 77.884 miles per hour (125.342 km/h)

== Standings after the race ==
Drivers' Championship standings

| | Pos | Driver | Points |
|---|---|---|---|
| | 1 | Justin Allgaier | 470 |
| 1 | 2 | Sheldon Creed | 340 (–130) |
| 1 | 3 | Jesse Love | 324 (–146) |
| 1 | 4 | Corey Day | 304 (–166) |
| 1 | 5 | Carson Kvapil | 300 (–170) |
| 2 | 6 | Austin Hill | 293 (–177) |
| | 7 | Sammy Smith | 284 (–186) |
| | 8 | Brandon Jones | 275 (–195) |
| | 9 | Parker Retzlaff | 257 (–213) |
| 1 | 10 | William Sawalich | 254 (–216) |
| 1 | 11 | Rajah Caruth | 238 (–232) |
| | 12 | Taylor Gray | 230 (–240) |
Official driver's standings

Manufacturers' Championship standings

| Pos | Manufacturer | Points |
|---|---|---|
| 1 | Chevrolet | 474 |
| 2 | Toyota | 281 (–193) |
| 3 | Ford | 154 (–320) |

- Note: Only the first 12 positions are included for the driver standings.

| Previous race: 2026 North Carolina Education Lottery 250 | NASCAR O'Reilly Auto Parts Series; 2026 season | Next race: 2026 Kansas Lottery 300 |
