= Patrick Staropoli =

American racing driver (born 1989)

- Staropoli at Las Vegas Motor Speedway in 2026
- Born: Patrick Charles Staropoli; November 10, 1989 (age 37); Plantation, Florida, U.S.

NASCAR O'Reilly Auto Parts Series career
- 37 races run over 2 years
- 2026 position: 23rd
- Best finish: 23rd (2026)
- First race: 2025 US Marine Corps 250 (Martinsville)
- Last race: 2026 O'Reilly Auto Parts 300 (Homestead)
Wins	Top tens	Poles
0	0	0

NASCAR FedEx Freight Truck Series career
- 5 races run over 2 years
- 2025 position: 98th
- Best finish: 77th (2016)
- First race: 2016 Ford EcoBoost 300 (Homestead)
- Last race: 2025 Slim Jim 200 (Martinsville)
Wins	Top tens	Poles
0	0	0

ARCA Menards Series career
- 8 races run over 3 years
- Best finish: 20th (2025)
- First race: 2015 Lucas Oil 200 (Daytona)
- Last race: 2026 General Tire 100 at The Glen (Watkins Glen)
Wins	Top tens	Poles
0	3	0

ARCA Menards Series East career
- 7 races run over 3 years
- Best finish: 28th (2014)
- First race: 2014 New Smyrna 150 presented by JEGS (New Smyrna)
- Last race: 2025 Bush's Beans 200 (Bristol)
Wins	Top tens	Poles
0	4	0

ARCA Menards Series West career
- 6 races run over 4 years
- Best finish: 29th (2014)
- First race: 2013 Toyota/NAPA Auto Parts 150 (Spokane)
- Last race: 2026 General Tire 150 (Sonoma)
- First win: 2014 NAPA Auto Parts 150 (Irwindale)
Wins	Top tens	Poles
1	6	1
- Statistics up to date as of November 7, 2026.

Patrick Charles Staropoli (born November 10, 1989) is an American retina surgeon and professional stock car racing driver. He last competed full-time in the NASCAR O'Reilly Auto Parts Series, driving the No. 48 Chevrolet Camaro SS for Big Machine Racing, part-time in the ARCA Menards Series, driving the No. 51 Chevrolet SS for Rick Ware Racing, and part-time in the ARCA Menards Series West, driving the No. 20 Chevrolet SS for Bill McAnally Racing. He also previously competed in the NASCAR Craftsman Truck Series.

Born and raised in Plantation, Florida, Staropoli started competing in go-karts at the age of 13. Initially wanting to be a motorsports engineer, he switched interests to the medical field while studying at Harvard University. He continued to pursue both fields in auto racing and medicine after graduation, specializing in ophthalmology at the University of Miami. While at Miami, he continued to make periodical starts in NASCAR, including starts in the NASCAR Truck Series. After obtaining his master's degree, Staropoli continued to race periodically in late models in various series for eight years. In 2025, Staropoli returned to NASCAR after a nine-year absence.

== Early life and family background ==
Staropoli was born on November 10, 1989, in the town of Plantation, Florida, where he was raised. He is the son of Nick Staropoli Jr. and Arlene Staropoli. Staropoli was born alongside a sister named Devon. He was educated at Plantation High School where he graduated in 2008 as the valedictorian of his class. While attending Plantation High School, he was involved in numerous extracurriculars and activities. He was the vice president of the school's National Honor Society branch, competed in rocket competitions, and volunteered as a spokesman for an anti-drugs organization.

After high school, Staropoli attended Harvard University, initially majoring in engineering in hopes of becoming a team engineer in NASCAR or Formula One. However, he switched majors during his sophomore year, switching to neurobiology after attending a neurobiology panel. He stated in a 2015 interview that the increased broadness of potential jobs in neurobiology appealed to him, causing him to switch. While at Harvard, he joined a club focused on conducting eye checks for disadvantaged communities. Staropoli graduated from Harvard in 2012 with suma cum laude honors.

== Racing career ==
=== Early racing career ===
According to Staropoli, he was inspired since his childhood to go into racing, having attended races since he was six months old, with both his father and grandfather being past racers. When he was 13 years old, Staropoli started racing go-karts in Naples, Florida. After a year, he moved into the Pure Stocks division, an entry stock car racing division. He eventually moved into the Super Late Models division for his family's race team after achieving straight As throughout his grade school years.

=== 2013–2016: Early NASCAR career ===
In 2013, Staropoli was invited to compete in the PEAK Stock Car Dream Challenge, a reality television show organized by NASCAR racing team Michael Waltrip Racing and its owner Michael Waltrip. Out of ten finalists, Staropoli won the competition, earning a part-time ride in the NASCAR K&N Pro Series for Bill McAnally Racing. He made his debut for the team in the NASCAR K&N Pro Series West at Spokane, finishing in fifth. The following year, Staropoli signed on for a five-race deal for Bill McAnally to race in both the East and West divisions. In March of that year, he earned his first victory in the West Series, winning at Irwindale. Staropoli earned one more top five in the 2014 West Series season, and earned three top-tens in the East Series, with a best finish of sixth at Bristol.

Starting in 2015, Staropoli faced a conflict between his medical school work at the University of Miami and his auto racing career. After a sponsorship deal failed to materialize in the winter of 2015, he took a brief hiatus from NASCAR to focus on medical school after making his debut in the ARCA Racing Series at Daytona in February for Empire Racing. He returned to racing that year in September for Bill McAnally, retiring in both of his races at Richmond and Dover. In 2016, Staropoli made his NASCAR debut in the NASCAR Craftsman Truck Series at Homestead–Miami, finishing in 31st in a partnership entry between Young's Motorsports and SS-Green Light Racing.

From 2017 to 2024, Staropoli stepped out of NASCAR to focus on his medical career, occasionally racing in late model and modified divisions in his free time.

=== 2025–2026: Return to NASCAR ===
Staropoli raced part-time in multiple series in 2025 and made several debuts in NASCAR-sanctioned series, including the ARCA Racing Series, the NASCAR Truck Series, and the NASCAR Xfinity Series for various racing teams. He made his season debut in the ARCA Racing Series at Phoenix on March 7 for Venturini Motorsports, where he finished in eighth after recovering from a spin. Three weeks later, Staropoli made his first start in the Truck Series in over nine seasons at Martinsville, finishing in 20th in a Cook Racing Technologies entry. The day after his Martinsville start in the Truck Series, he made his debut in the Xfinity Series at Martinsville in an entry for Sam Hunt Racing, finishing in 16th.

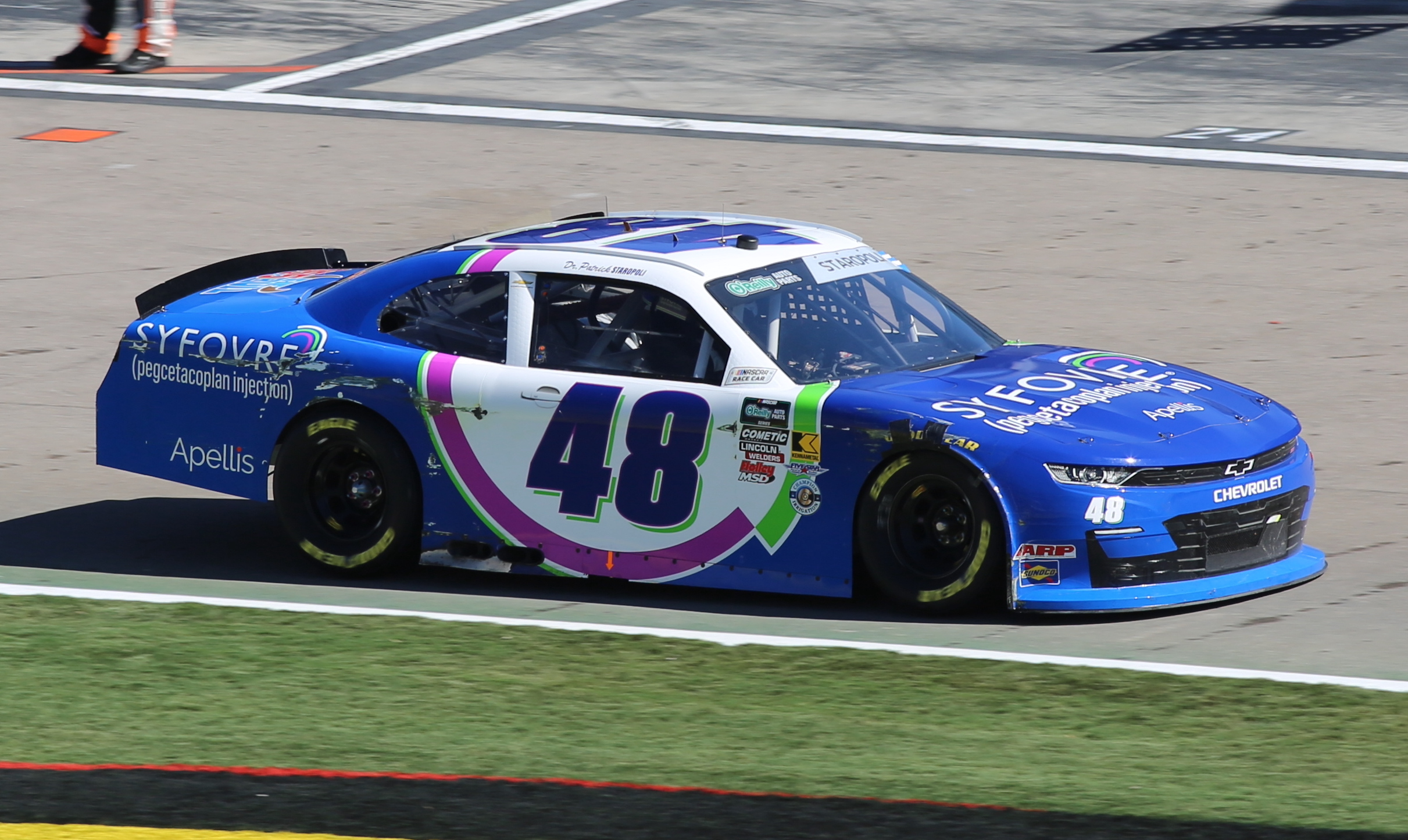
Staropoli's No. 48 car at Las Vegas Motor Speedway in 2026

Staropoli moved up full-time to the NASCAR O'Reilly Auto Parts Series for 2026, signing with Big Machine Racing on December 23, 2025. He started the 2026 season with an 18th-place finish at Daytona. In late January 2026, Staropoli moved to Charlotte, North Carolina, to work more closely with Big Machine Racing and regularly train at the team's race shop.

== Non-racing ventures and personal life ==
Outside of racing, Staropoli pursues a career in ophthalmology, currently working as a retina surgeon at the Retina Consultants of Texas. After graduating from Harvard in 2012, he attended the Miller School of Medicine at the University of Miami, graduating in 2017 with a MD. According to Staropoli, he was inspired to enter the medicine field after witnessing a near-fatal racing accident that his father was involved in 2001 at Hialeah Speedway. In 2024, Staropoli launched Driving to Fight Blindness, an awareness campaign focused on retinal diseases. Speaking about his careers, he stated in an interview with WSVN, "I find that I think I’m a better race car driver because I’m a doctor. And the other way around: being a racecar driver makes me a better physician. I think the skills definitely translate."

In 2010, Staropoli was diagnosed with coeliac disease. Staropoli's favorite driver is Jeff Gordon, stating in the Sun Sentinel, "I'm the biggest Jeff Gordon fan... having people tell me my whole life that one day I would end up getting to race [in the Cup Series]. You half believed it, half dreamed it."

In 2026, Staropoli joined his Big Machine Racing team in working as a tire changer at the ARCA race at Iowa, pitting the Clubb Racing Inc. No. 03, driven by Alex Clubb.

== Motorsports career results ==
=== Racing career summary ===
Season	Series	Team	Races	Wins	Top 5	Top 10	Points	Position
2013	NASCAR K&N Pro Series West	Bill McAnally Racing	2	0	1	2	77	35th
2014	NASCAR K&N Pro Series West	Bill McAnally Racing	2	1	2	2	88	29th
2014	NASCAR K&N Pro Series East	Bill McAnally Racing	3	0	0	2	107	28th
2015	NASCAR K&N Pro Series East	Bill McAnally Racing	2	0	0	0	29	52nd
2015	ARCA Racing Series	Empire Racing	1	0	0	0	125	114th
2016	NASCAR Camping World Truck Series	Young's Motorsports	1	0	0	0	2	77th
2024	SMART Modified Tour	Coulter Motorsports	2	0	0	2	66	33rd
2025	ARCA Menards Series West	Venturini Motorsports	1	0	0	1	36	48th
2025	ARCA Menards Series East	Venturini Motorsports	2	0	1	2	74	33rd
2025	ARCA Menards Series	Venturini Motorsports	4	0	0	3	194	20th
2025	ARCA Menards Series	Cook Racing Technologies	1	0	0	0	194	20th
2025	NASCAR Craftsman Truck Series	Cook Racing Technologies	4	0	0	0	0	NC†
2025	NASCAR Xfinity Series	Sam Hunt Racing	4	0	0	0	58	43rd
2026	ARCA Menards Series West	Bill McAnally Racing					TBD	TBD
2026	ARCA Menards Series	Rick Ware Racing					TBD	TBD
2026	NASCAR O'Reilly Auto Parts Series	Big Machine Racing					TBD	TBD

=== NASCAR ===
(key) (Bold – Pole position awarded by qualifying time. Italics – Pole position earned by points standings or practice time. * – Most laps led.)

==== O'Reilly Auto Parts Series ====
NASCAR O'Reilly Auto Parts Series results
Year	Team	No.	Make	1	2	3	4	5	6	7	8	9	10	11	12	13	14	15	16	17	18	19	20	21	22	23	24	25	26	27	28	29	30	31	32	33	NOAPSC	Pts	Ref
2025	Sam Hunt Racing	24	Toyota	DAY	ATL	COA	PHO	LVS	HOM	MAR; 16	DAR	BRI	CAR	TAL	TEX	CLT	NSH	MXC	POC	ATL; 35	CSC	SON	DOV	IND	IOW	GLN	DAY	PIR	GTW	BRI	KAN; 22	ROV	LVS	TAL	MAR; 17	PHO	43rd	58	
2026	Big Machine Racing	48	Chevy	DAY; 18	ATL; 13	COA; 20	PHO; 26	LVS; 21	DAR; 29	MAR; 16	CAR; 34	BRI; 27	KAN; 14	TAL; 37	TEX; 17	GLN; 38	DOV; 21	CLT; 18	NSH; 25	POC; 25	COR; 20	SON; 25	CHI; 27	ATL; 13	IND; 23	IOW; 18	DAY; 34	DAR; 32	GTW; 17	BRI; 26	LVS; 24	CLT; 33	PHO; 21	TAL; 32	MAR; 19	HOM; 17	23rd	444	

==== Craftsman Truck Series ====
NASCAR Craftsman Truck Series results
Year	Team	No.	Make	1	2	3	4	5	6	7	8	9	10	11	12	13	14	15	16	17	18	19	20	21	22	23	24	25	NCTC	Pts	Ref
2016	Young's Motorsports	07	Chevy	DAY	ATL	MAR	KAN	DOV	CLT	TEX	IOW	GTW	KEN	ELD	POC	BRI	MCH	MSP	CHI	NHA	LVS	TAL	MAR	TEX	PHO	HOM; 31			77th	2	
2025	Cook Racing Technologies	84	Toyota	DAY	ATL	LVS	HOM	MAR; 20	BRI; 29	CAR	TEX	KAN	NWS	CLT	NSH	MCH	POC	LRP	IRP	GLN	RCH; 23	DAR	BRI	NHA	ROV	TAL	MAR; 15	PHO	98th	0^{1}	

^{*} Season still in progress
^{1} Ineligible for series points

=== ARCA Menards Series ===
(key) (Bold – Pole position awarded by qualifying time. Italics – Pole position earned by points standings or practice time. * – Most laps led.)

ARCA Menards Series results
Year	Team	No.	Make	1	2	3	4	5	6	7	8	9	10	11	12	13	14	15	16	17	18	19	20	AMSC	Pts	Ref
2015	Empire Racing	82	Ford	DAY; 21	MOB	NSH	SLM	TAL	TOL	NJE	POC	MCH	CHI	WIN	IOW	IRP	POC	BLN	ISF	DSF	SLM	KEN	KAN	114th	125	
2025	Venturini Motorsports	25	Toyota	DAY	PHO; 8			CLT; 8	MCH	BLN	ELK	LRP	DOV	IRP	IOW	GLN	ISF	MAD	DSF	BRI; 10	SLM			20th	194	
2025	Venturini Motorsports	15	Toyota			TAL; 11																		20th	194	
2025	Cook Racing Technologies	17	Toyota				KAN; 22															KAN; 11	TOL	20th	194	
2026	Rick Ware Racing	51	Chevy	DAY	PHO	KAN	TAL	GLN; 22	TOL	MCH	POC	BER	ELK	CHI	LRP	IRP	IOW	ISF	MAD	DSF	SLM	BRI	KAN	118th	22	

==== ARCA Menards Series East ====
ARCA Menards Series East results
Year	Team	No.	Make	1	2	3	4	5	6	7	8	9	10	11	12	13	14	15	16	AMSEC	Pts	Ref
2014	Bill McAnally Racing	99	Toyota	NSM; 11	DAY; 8	BRI; 6	GRE	RCH	IOW	BGS	FIF	LGY	NHA	COL	IOW	GLN	VIR	GRE	DOV	28th	107	
2015	Bill McAnally Racing	99	Toyota	NSM	GRE	BRI	IOW	BGS	LGY	COL	NHA	IOW	GLN	MOT	VIR	RCH; 35	DOV; 24			52nd	29	
2025	Venturini Motorsports	25	Toyota	FIF	CAR; 4	NSV	FRS	DOV	IRP	IOW	BRI; 10									33rd	74	

==== ARCA Menards Series West ====
ARCA Menards Series West results
Year	Team	No.	Make	1	2	3	4	5	6	7	8	9	10	11	12	13	14	15	AMSWC	Pts	Ref
2013	Bill McAnally Racing	99	Toyota	PHO	S99	BIR	IOW	L44	SON	CNS	IOW	EVG	SPO; 5	MMP	SMP	AAS; 6	KCR	PHO	35th	77	
2014	Bill McAnally Racing	99	Toyota	PHO	IRW; 1	S99	**IOW**; 3	KCR	SON	SLS	CNS	IOW	EVG	KCR	MMP	AAS	PHO		29th	88	
2025	Venturini Motorsports	25	Toyota	KER	PHO; 8	TUC	CNS	KER	SON	TRI	PIR	AAS	MAD	LVS	PHO				48th	36	
2026	Bill McAnally Racing	20	Chevy	KER	PHO	TUC	SHA	CNS	TRI	SON; 5	PIR	AAS	MAD	LVS	PHO	KER			51st	39	

=== SMART Modified Tour ===
SMART Modified Tour results
Year	Car owner	No.	Make	1	2	3	4	5	6	7	8	9	10	11	12	13	14	SMTC	Pts	Ref
2024	Coulter Motorsports	97	N/A	FLO	CRW	SBO	TRI	ROU	HCY	FCS; 9	CRW	JAC	CAR	CRW	DOM	**SBO**; 7	NWS	33rd	66	
