= American Victory =

American Victory is a name used by at least two ships:

- SS American Victory, built in 1945, a Victory ship that is now a museum in Tampa, Florida
- SS American Victory, built in 1942 as the tanker Marquette and served in World War II as the oiler USS Neshanic (AO-71), a vessel operated by American Steamship Company, acquired in 2006 and renamed American Victory.
